= 2023 World Table Tennis Championships – Women's singles =

Women's singles at the 2023 World Table Tennis Championships
- Venue: Durban International Convention Centre
- Location: Durban, KwaZulu-Natal, South Africa
- Dates: 20–28 May

Medalists
gold medal	Sun Yingsha	China
silver medal	Chen Meng	China
bronze medal	Hina Hayata	Japan
bronze medal	Chen Xingtong	China

The women's singles competition of the 2023 World Table Tennis Championships was held from 20 to 28 May 2023. The event was played as a straight knockout. All singles matches were best of 7 games.

== Seeds ==
Singles events had 32 seeded players. Seeding was based on the ITTF world ranking published on 16 May 2023.

1. (China) Sun Yingsha (champion)
2. (China) Wang Manyu (quarterfinals)
3. (China) Chen Meng (final)
4. (China) Wang Yidi (quarterfinals)
5. (China) Chen Xingtong (semifinals)
6. (Japan) Mima Ito (quarterfinals)
7. (Japan) Hina Hayata (semifinals)
8. (Germany) Han Ying (quarterfinals)
9. (Puerto Rico) Adriana Díaz (fourth round)
10. (Austria) Sofia Polcanova (first round)
11. (Germany) Nina Mittelham (fourth round)
12. (Chinese Taipei) Cheng I-ching (fourth round)
13. (France) Jia Nan Yuan (third round)
14. (Japan) Miyuu Kihara (fourth round)
15. (Japan) Miu Hirano (fourth round)
16. (Hong Kong) Doo Hoi Kem (second round)
17. (Romania) Bernadette Szőcs (third round)
18. (United States) Lily Zhang (first round)
19. (South Korea) Shin Yu-bin (fourth round)
20. (Germany) Shan Xiaona (third round)
21. (Egypt) Dina Meshref (third round)
22. (Chinese Taipei) Chen Szu-yu (first round)
23. (Portugal) Fu Yu (third round)
24. (Japan) Miyu Nagasaki (third round)
25. (Thailand) Suthasini Sawettabut (second round)
26. (South Korea) Jeon Ji-hee (third round)
27. (Romania) Elizabeta Samara (third round)
28. (Egypt) Hana Goda (second round)
29. (Brazil) Bruna Takahashi (first round)
30. (India) Manika Batra (third round)
31. (South Korea) Choi Hyo-joo (second round)
32. (Germany) Sabine Winter (second round)

== Draw ==
The draw took place on 18 May. Players of the same association were separated only in the first round of the draw.

=== Key ===
- r = Retired
- w/o = Walkover

=== Finals ===
Quarterfinals
1	(China) Sun Yingsha	11	11	11	11
8	(Germany) Han Ying	6	8	6	5
7	(Japan) Hina Hayata	4	11	11	6	11	8	21
4	(China) Wang Yidi	11	3	9	11	9	11	19
3	(China) Chen Meng	11	11	11	11
6	(Japan) Mima Ito	7	5	5	5
5	(China) Chen Xingtong	11	11	11	11
2	(China) Wang Manyu	5	8	8	9

Semifinals
1	(China) Sun Yingsha	11	11	11	5	11
7	(Japan) Hina Hayata	4	5	8	11	8
3	(China) Chen Meng	5	13	14	11	11
5	(China) Chen Xingtong	11	11	12	8	7

Final
1	(China) Sun Yingsha	5	11	11	11	7	11
3	(China) Chen Meng	11	8	7	7	11	6

=== Top half ===
==== Section 1 ====
First round
(Austria) Solja	2	12	11	11	7	11
(Sweden) Bergand	11	10	9	6	11	7
(Canada) Liao	8	9	7	7
(France) Pavade	11	11	11	11
(Chinese Taipei) Huang	9	6	11	6	11	2
27	(Romania) Samara	11	11	9	11	9	11
19	(South Korea) Shin	11	10	11	13	11
(Canada) Zhang	5	12	9	11	2
(France) Zarif	12	8	11	11	5	11
(United States) Wang	10	11	6	1	11	7
(Slovakia) Balážová	11	10	11	14	11	6	11
(Spain) Zhang	6	12	4	16	6	11	4
(Italy) Vivarelli	5	3	11	11	6	10
13	(France) Yuan	11	11	8	9	11	12

Second round
1	(China) Sun	11	11	11	11
(Austria) Solja	4	7	3	5
(France) Pavade	8	11	11	7	12	8
27	(Romania) Samara	11	5	4	11	14	11
19	(South Korea) Shin	7	11	11	11	11
(France) Zarif	11	8	4	6	6
(Slovakia) Balážová	9	6	7	11	11	7
13	(France) Yuan	11	11	11	9	5	11

Third round
1	(China) Sun	11	12	11	11
27	(Romania) Samara	8	10	8	5
19	(South Korea) Shin	9	11	11	8	9	11	12
13	(France) Yuan	11	9	9	11	11	5	10

Fourth round
1	(China) Sun	11	11	11	11
19	(South Korea) Shin	6	8	8	5

==== Section 2 ====
First round
10	(Austria) Polcanova	9	11	11	11	2	11	9
(Hungary) Madarász	11	7	7	4	11	13	11
(India) Mukherjee	11	11	10	10	6	11	8
(Slovakia) Kukuľková	3	4	12	12	11	5	11
(Chile) Vega	15	3	11	6	8	9
(Italy) Monfardini	13	11	5	11	11	11
(Poland) Bajor	5	11	5	13	12	9
32	(Germany) Winter	11	5	11	11	14	11
22	(Chinese Taipei) Chen	11	10	2	6
(Romania) Dragoman	13	12	11	11
(Turkey) Yılmaz	11	11	10	11	15
(Argentina) Argüelles	9	8	12	7	13
(Italy) Arlia	6	9	11	4	5
(India) Akula	11	11	9	11	11
(England) Ho	3	7	6	8
8	(Germany) Han	11	11	11	11

Second round
(Hungary) Madarász	7	4	7	10
(Slovakia) Kukuľková	11	11	11	12
(Italy) Monfardini	11	4	14	10	11	11
32	(Germany) Winter	8	11	12	12	7	8
(Romania) Dragoman	11	14	11	11
(Turkey) Yılmaz	3	12	4	4
(India) Akula	2	4	2	4
8	(Germany) Han	11	11	11	11

Third round
(Slovakia) Kukuľková	11	8	11	11	11
(Italy) Monfardini	5	11	5	3	9
(Romania) Dragoman	5	3	3	6
8	(Germany) Han	11	11	11	11

Fourth round
(Slovakia) Kukuľková	1	5	6	2
8	(Germany) Han	11	11	11	11

==== Section 3 ====
First round
7	(Japan) Hayata	11	11	11	14
(United States) Jalli	6	7	8	12
(Italy) Piccolin	9	11	11	11	11
(Hong Kong) Ng	11	5	8	4	6
(Puerto Rico) M. Díaz	11	11	11	11
(South Africa) Kalam	2	6	8	5
(South Africa) Patel	2	6	1	3
24	(Japan) Nagasaki	11	11	11	11
29	(Brazil) Takahashi	3	11	11	8	2	9
(South Korea) Suh	11	6	8	11	11	11
(Austria) Mischek	11	9	3	11	0	6
(Ukraine) Brateyko	3	11	11	7	11	11
(Romania) Diaconu	11	11	11	11
(Singapore) Goi	8	5	3	4
(Mauritius) Kinoo	4	1	2	5
16	(Hong Kong) Doo	11	11	11	11

Second round
7	(Japan) Hayata	11	11	11	11
(Italy) Piccolin	7	4	2	8
(Puerto Rico) M. Díaz
24	(Japan) Nagasaki	w/o
(South Korea) Suh	11	11	11	3	11
(Ukraine) Brateyko	9	4	5	11	7
(Romania) Diaconu	11	11	11	10	8	14
16	(Hong Kong) Doo	3	3	5	12	11	12

Third round
7	(Japan) Hayata	11	11	11	11
24	(Japan) Nagasaki	3	6	8	3
(South Korea) Suh	11	11	11	10	11	11
(Romania) Diaconu	9	3	6	12	13	6

Fourth round
7	(Japan) Hayata	11	11	11	11
(South Korea) Suh	5	9	6	8

==== Section 4 ====
First round
15	(Japan) Hirano	11	11	11	11
(Singapore) Zeng	5	4	8	5
(Cameroon) Hanffou	4	4	5	11	12	11	8
(Germany) Kaufmann	11	11	11	4	10	8	11
(Ukraine) Pesotska	11	11	11	11
(Hungary) Bálint	9	8	9	5
(Serbia) Todorović	9	6	11	4	3
26	(South Korea) Jeon	11	11	8	11	11
23	(Portugal) Fu	11	11	11	9	11
(Mexico) Barcenas	2	3	7	11	2
(Vanuatu) Santhy
(Nigeria) Bello	^{w/o}
(Turkey) Altinkaya	7	10	10	6
(Spain) Xiao	11	12	12	11
(Croatia) Jeger	2	5	3	2
4	(China) Wang Y.	11	11	11	11

Second round
15	(Japan) Hirano	11	4	11	11	7	11
(Germany) Kaufmann	9	11	4	4	11	4
(Ukraine) Pesotska	11	2	4	6	10
26	(South Korea) Jeon	9	11	11	11	12
23	(Portugal) Fu	11	11	11	11
(Nigeria) Bello	0	1	6	6
(Spain) Xiao	5	3	4	3
4	(China) Wang Y.	11	11	11	11

Third round
15	(Japan) Hirano	11	11	11	12
26	(South Korea) Jeon	9	6	6	10
23	(Portugal) Fu	6	11	8	3	13
4	(China) Wang Y.	11	8	11	11	15

Fourth round
15	(Japan) Hirano	7	12	9	1
4	(China) Wang Y.	11	14	11	11

=== Bottom half ===
==== Section 5 ====
First round
3	(China) Chen M.	11	11	11	11
(Egypt) Helmy	5	1	5	4
(Thailand) J. Sawettabut	12	6	11	11	11	11
(Wales) Carey	14	11	6	9	6	7
(Hungary) Hartbrich	8	4	6	6
(Luxembourg) Ni	11	11	11	11
(Chile) Ortega	8	6	6	4
20	(Germany) Shan	11	11	11	11
21	(Egypt) Meshref	2	11	11	11	10	11
(Singapore) Zhou	11	9	8	7	12	9
(Kazakhstan) Mirkadirova	11	3	8	6	1
(Poland) Węgrzyn	8	11	11	11	11
(Hong Kong) Lam	7	11	6	8	11	11
(Thailand) Paranang	11	4	11	11	8	13
(Mexico) Silva	3	8	7	11	9
14	(Japan) Kihara	11	11	11	7	11

Second round
3	(China) Chen M.	11	11	11	11
(Thailand) J. Sawettabut	5	2	2	3
(Luxembourg) Ni	9	6	10	11	11	11	7
20	(Germany) Shan	11	11	12	4	9	7	11
21	(Egypt) Meshref	11	11	11	11
(Poland) Węgrzyn	7	6	8	7
(Thailand) Paranang	4	7	5	2
14	(Japan) Kihara	11	11	11	11

Third round
3	(China) Chen M.	11	11	11	11
20	(Germany) Shan	2	6	4	2
21	(Egypt) Meshref	11	4	6	1	5
14	(Japan) Kihara	8	11	11	11	11

Fourth round
3	(China) Chen M.	11	7	11	5	11	11
14	(Japan) Kihara	8	11	5	11	7	7

==== Section 6 ====
First round
9	(Puerto Rico) A. Díaz	11	11	11	7	14
(Brazil) Kumahara	8	7	7	11	12
(Slovenia) Tofant	7	3	9	4
(Croatia) Malobabić	11	11	11	11
(Singapore) Wong	11	11	11	11	9	11
(Slovakia) Labošová	8	8	9	13	11	4
(Algeria) Loghraibi	1	3	2	5
30	(India) Batra	11	11	11	11
25	(Thailand) S. Sawettabut	11	7	11	9	11	4	11
(Serbia) Šurjan	7	11	9	11	8	11	6
(Hungary) Póta	11	11	11	11
(Australia) Tapper	1	5	5	9
(Kazakhstan) Lavrova	8	6	1	1
(France) Ca. Lutz	11	11	11	11
(Kazakhstan) Akasheva	4	7	9	1
6	(Japan) Ito	11	11	11	11

Second round
9	(Puerto Rico) A. Díaz	14	11	9	11	11
(Croatia) Malobabić	12	1	11	4	5
(Singapore) Wong	9	12	4	8
30	(India) Batra	11	14	11	11
25	(Thailand) S. Sawettabut	6	11	8	9	11
(Hungary) Póta	11	8	11	11	13
(France) Ca. Lutz	4	4	3	2
6	(Japan) Ito	11	11	11	11

Third round
9	(Puerto Rico) A. Díaz	6	12	11	6	13	9	11
30	(India) Batra	11	10	9	11	11	11	3
(Hungary) Póta	7	7	7	8
6	(Japan) Ito	11	11	11	11

Fourth round
9	(Puerto Rico) A. Díaz	8	9	12	10
6	(Japan) Ito	11	11	14	12

==== Section 7 ====
First round
5	(China) Chen X.	11	11	11	11
(Luxembourg) De Nutte	7	4	7	3
(Portugal) Shao	9	15	9	5
(South Korea) Lee	11	17	11	11
(Nigeria) Edem	11	6	2	5	0
(Hong Kong) Zhu	9	11	11	11	11
(Serbia) Lupulesku	8	9	5	9
31	(South Korea) Choi	11	11	11	11
17	(Romania) Szőcs	13	11	8	11	11
(Sweden) Källberg	11	8	11	1	5
(Egypt) Alhodaby	11	11	11	11	11
(Mexico) Cossio Aceves	4	4	7	13	8
(France) Ch. Lutz	11	11	11	11
(Nigeria) Oshonaike	7	4	6	7
(Czech Republic) Tomanovská	7	6	2	4
12	(Chinese Taipei) Cheng	11	11	11	11

Second round
5	(China) Chen X.	11	11	10	11	11
(South Korea) Lee	9	4	12	6	6
(Hong Kong) Zhu	11	10	11	3	12	11
31	(South Korea) Choi	4	12	7	11	10	9
17	(Romania) Szőcs	11	13	8	11	9	8	11
(Egypt) Alhodaby	8	11	11	7	11	11	6
(France) Ch. Lutz	12	11	6	2	12	6
12	(Chinese Taipei) Cheng	10	9	11	11	14	11

Third round
5	(China) Chen X.	11	8	12	11	11	11
(Hong Kong) Zhu	4	11	14	4	5	7
17	(Romania) Szőcs	6	11	4	7	13
12	(Chinese Taipei) Cheng	11	4	11	11	15

Fourth round
5	(China) Chen X.	8	9	11	9	12	12	11
12	(Chinese Taipei) Cheng	11	11	6	11	10	10	7

==== Section 8 ====
First round
11	(Germany) Mittelham	11	11	11	11
(South Africa) Maphanga	1	7	5	4
(Croatia) Arapović	7	11	11	12	3	8
(India) Tennison	11	8	5	14	11	11
(Chinese Taipei) Li	8	11	11	8	11	11
(Greece) Toliou	11	5	6	11	2	2
(Switzerland) Moret	7	5	3	11	11
28	(Egypt) Goda	11	11	11	9	13
18	(United States) Zhang	8	4	5	9
(Sweden) Bergström	11	11	11	11
(Ukraine) Haponova	10	12	11	11	3	11
(Hong Kong) Lee	12	10	3	9	11	9
(Czech Republic) Matelová	11	11	9	11	11
(Argentina) Codina	5	6	11	5	7

Second round
11	(Germany) Mittelham	11	11	9	11	11
(India) Tennison	8	3	11	8	5
(Chinese Taipei) Li	8	11	11	11	11
28	(Egypt) Goda	11	9	3	7	4
(Sweden) Bergström	8	12	14	7	6
(Ukraine) Haponova	11	10	16	11	11
(Czech Republic) Matelová	3	4	5	7
2	(China) Wang M.	11	11	11	11

Third round
11	(Germany) Mittelham	11	11	11	11
(Chinese Taipei) Li	7	7	9	4
(Ukraine) Haponova	11	7	12	9	1	12	3
2	(China) Wang M.	9	11	10	11	11	10	11

Fourth round
11	(Germany) Mittelham	12	7	8	7	5
2	(China) Wang M.	10	11	11	11	11
