= 2021 World Table Tennis Championships – Women's singles =

Women's singles at the 2021 World Table Tennis Championships
- Venue: George R. Brown Convention Center
- Location: Houston, United States
- Dates: 23–29 November
- Final score: 11–13, 11–7, 6–11, 11–6, 11–8, 17–15

Medalists
gold medal	Wang Manyu	China
silver medal	Sun Yingsha	China
bronze medal	Chen Meng	China
bronze medal	Wang Yidi	China

The women's singles competition of the 2021 World Table Tennis Championships was held from 23 to 29 November 2021. Liu Shiwen was the defending champion but did not compete in this year's tournament.

Wang Manyu won the title after defeating Sun Yingsha 11–13, 11–7, 6–11, 11–6, 11–8, 17–15.

== Seeds ==
Seeding was based on the ITTF world ranking published on 16 November 2021.

1. (China) Chen Meng (semifinals)
2. (China) Sun Yingsha (final)
3. (Japan) Mima Ito (quarterfinals)
4. (China) Wang Manyu (world champion)
5. (Chinese Taipei) Cheng I-ching (fourth round)
6. (Japan) Kasumi Ishikawa (quarterfinals)
7. (China) Wang Yidi (semifinals)
8. (Singapore) Feng Tianwei (third round)
9. (Japan) Miu Hirano (fourth round)
10. (Hong Kong) Doo Hoi Kem (fourth round)
11. (South Korea) Jeon Ji-hee (third round)
12. (China) Chen Xingtong (quarterfinals)
13. (Austria) Sofia Polcanova (first round)
14. (Puerto Rico) Adriana Díaz (fourth round)
15. (Japan) Hina Hayata (fourth round)
16. (Germany) Petrissa Solja (second round)
17. (Germany) Ying Han (third round)
18. (South Korea) Suh Hyo-won (quarterfinals)
19. (Romania) Bernadette Szőcs (fourth round)
20. (Chinese Taipei) Chen Szu-yu (third round)
21. (Netherlands) Britt Eerland (second round)
22. (Ukraine) Margaryta Pesotska (third round)
23. (Germany) Nina Mittelham (first round)
24. (Romania) Elizabeta Samara (second round)
25. (Hong Kong) Minnie Soo (first round)
26. (United States) Lily Zhang (third round)
27. (Egypt) Dina Meshref (third round)
28. (Germany) Shan Xiaona (third round)
29. (Thailand) Suthasini Sawettabut (fourth round)
30. (Canada) Mo Zhang (second round)
31. (Luxembourg) Ni Xialian (third round)
32. (Czech Republic) Hana Matelová (second round)

== Draw ==
=== Finals ===
Quarterfinals
1	(China) Chen Meng	11	11	11	11
6	(Japan) Kasumi Ishikawa	9	6	8	6
12	(China) Chen Xingtong	9	7	1	11
4	(China) Wang Manyu	11	11	11	13
3	(Japan) Mima Ito	10	11	2	7	9
7	(China) Wang Yidi	12	7	11	11	11
18	(South Korea) Suh Hyo-won	9	4	4	7
2	(China) Sun Yingsha	11	11	11	11

Semifinals
1	(China) Chen Meng	11	11	8	6	13	9	8
4	(China) Wang Manyu	9	7	11	11	11	11	11
7	(China) Wang Yidi	8	11	8	6	8
2	(China) Sun Yingsha	11	3	11	11	11

Final
4	(China) Wang Manyu	11	11	6	11	11	17
2	(China) Sun Yingsha	13	7	11	6	8	15

=== Top half ===
==== Section 1 ====
First round
(Thailand) Paranang	11	12	6	9	7	11	5
(Singapore) Lin	9	10	11	11	11	6	11
(Hungary) Madarasz	7	1	5	11	3
(Luxembourg) De Nutte	11	11	11	4	11
(South Korea) Shin	11	11	11	11
25	(Hong Kong) Soo	8	7	6	3
30	(Canada) Zhang	7	11	11	8	11	10	11
(Portugal) Shao	11	9	9	11	9	12	8
(Slovakia) Balážová	11	11	11	11
(Italy) Vivarelli	7	7	9	8
(India) Batra	11	15	8	4	6	11	7
(Brazil) Takahashi	5	13	11	11	11	4	11
(Russia) Tailakova	8	6	6	9
9	(Japan) Hirano	11	11	11	11

Second round
1	(China) Chen M.	11	11	11	11
(Singapore) Lin	7	9	4	3
(Luxembourg) De Nutte	13	11	5	11	7	2	11
(South Korea) Shin	11	8	11	7	11	11	9
30	(Canada) Zhang	7	6	3	9
(Slovakia) Balážová	11	11	11	11
(Brazil) Takahashi	5	9	9	14
9	(Japan) Hirano	11	11	11	16

Third round
1	(China) Chen M.	11	11	11	11
(Luxembourg) De Nutte	2	5	3	2
(Slovakia) Balážová	12	5	7	11	3	11	7
9	(Japan) Hirano	10	11	11	6	11	8	11

Fourth round
1	(China) Chen M.	12	13	8	11	11	11	11
9	(Japan) Hirano	10	15	11	8	7	13	5

==== Section 2 ====
First round
(Spain) Zhang	11	12	6	5	3
(United States) Wu	6	14	11	11	11
(Belgium) Marchetti	5	11	7	8	11	8
(Poland) Bajor	11	7	11	11	9	11
(Chile) Vega	2	5	4	4
19	(Romania) Szőcs	11	11	11	11
22	(Ukraine) Pesotska	3
(Egypt) Helmy	1^{r}
(Chinese Taipei) Cheng H.	11	5	12	11	13	11
(Poland) Partyka	8	11	14	9	11	7
(Mexico) Silva	11	3	11	6	9	5
(Italy) Piccolin	8	11	5	11	11	11

Second round
11	(South Korea) Jeon	11	11	11	11
(United States) Wu	3	1	2	7
(Poland) Bajor	5	11	11	10	5
19	(Romania) Szőcs	11	13	9	12	11
22	(Ukraine) Pesotska	10	6	13	11	11	11
(Chinese Taipei) Cheng H.	12	11	11	7	7	8
(Italy) Piccolin	12	5	4	7
6	(Japan) Ishikawa	14	11	11	11

Third round
11	(South Korea) Jeon	11	9	11	9	11	9
19	(Romania) Szőcs	13	11	3	11	5	11
22	(Ukraine) Pesotska	4	7	5	2
6	(Japan) Ishikawa	11	11	11	11

Fourth round
19	(Romania) Szőcs	6	9	8	8
6	(Japan) Ishikawa	11	11	11	11

==== Section 3 ====
First round
(England) Ho	9	11	11	12	11	11
(France) Migot	11	4	6	14	9	8
(Guatemala) Enriquez	5	2	7	5
(Turkey) Altinkaya	11	11	11	11
(United States) Wang	11	11	11	11
23	(Germany) Mittelham	8	9	6	9
28	(Germany) Shan	8	11	9	11	11	17
(Russia) Vorobeva	11	6	11	9	9	15
(Belgium) Degraef	10	5	2	8
(France) Chasselin	12	11	11	11
(Hong Kong) Zhu	11	11	11	11
(Spain) Xiao	9	7	5	9
(Russia) Noskova	9	3	5	4
12	(China) Chen X.	11	11	11	11

Second round
5	(Chinese Taipei) Cheng I.	11	11	11	11
(England) Ho	6	4	3	3
(Turkey) Altinkaya	7	5	6	9
(United States) Wang	11	11	11	11
28	(Germany) Shan	11	11	11	11
(France) Chasselin	2	6	8	3
(Hong Kong) Zhu	0	4	5	3
12	(China) Chen X.	11	11	11	11

Third round
5	(Chinese Taipei) Cheng I.	11	11	11	11
(United States) Wang	5	7	7	4
28	(Germany) Shan	5	8	9	6
12	(China) Chen X.	11	11	11	11

Fourth round
5	(Chinese Taipei) Cheng I.	6	13	6	5	2
12	(China) Chen X.	11	11	11	11	11

==== Section 4 ====
First round
13	(Austria) Polcanova	13	9	5	5	11	11	7
(Romania) Diaconu	11	11	11	11	7	8	11
(Chile) Ortega	8	5	4	8
(France) Yuan	11	11	11	11
(Singapore) Wong	6	14	12	11	9
(Chinese Taipei) Liu	11	16	14	8	11
(Poland) Wegrzyn	6	9	4	8
24	(Romania) Samara	11	11	11	11
32	(Czech Republic) Matelová	13	11	11	8	11
(Hungary) Póta	11	9	7	11	4
(Sweden) Bergstöm	11	11	11	11
(Argentina) Arguelles	5	3	7	1
(India) S. Mukherjee	11	4	5	0	4
(South Korea) Choi	8	11	11	11	11

Second round
(Romania) Diaconu	7	6	5	8
(France) Yuan	11	11	11	11
(Chinese Taipei) Liu	11	11	11	11
24	(Romania) Samara	7	8	9	6
32	(Czech Republic) Matelová	8	5	7	4
(Sweden) Bergstöm	11	11	11	11
(South Korea) Choi	6	7	4	4
4	(China) Wang M.	11	11	11	11

Third round
(France) Yuan	11	11	13	11
(Chinese Taipei) Liu	7	8	11	4
(Sweden) Bergstöm	10	6	8	2
4	(China) Wang M.	12	11	11	11

Fourth round
(France) Yuan	5	11	7	4	5
4	(China) Wang M.	11	9	11	11	11

=== Bottom half ===
==== Section 5 ====
First round
(Kazakhstan) Akasheva	11	11	11	5	11
(Puerto Rico) Rios	6	6	3	11	5
(India) Patkar	7	4	3	8
(Japan) Shibata	11	11	11	11
(Serbia) Šurjan	11	7	11	11	4	7	6
21	(Netherlands) Eerland	9	11	8	8	11	11	11
29	(Thailand) S. Sawettabut	11	11	11	11
(Austria) Mischek	4	8	7	8
(Singapore) Goi	9	9	12	11	11	5	11
(Ukraine) Brateyko	11	11	10	9	8	11	5
(Kazakhstan) Lavrova	11	9	11	7	11	9	6
(Romania) Dragoman	7	11	9	11	7	11	11
(Serbia) Lupulesku	6	4	6	8
16	(Germany) Solja	11	11	11	11

Second round
3	(Japan) Ito	11	11	11	13
(Kazakhstan) Akasheva	3	9	4	11
(Japan) Shibata	11	7	11	11	11	6	11
21	(Netherlands) Eerland	3	11	13	4	5	11	6
29	(Thailand) S. Sawettabut	11	11	11	11	11
(Singapore) Goi	8	7	5	13	5
(Romania) Dragoman	7	11	9	11	13	6	11
16	(Germany) Solja	11	9	11	9	11	11	7

Third round
3	(Japan) Ito	11	9	6	11	11	2	11
(Japan) Shibata	6	11	11	6	8	11	6
29	(Thailand) S. Sawettabut	11	11	8	7	11	11
(Romania) Dragoman	4	3	11	11	8	7

Fourth round
3	(Japan) Ito	11	9	11	8	12	12
29	(Thailand) S. Sawettabut	9	11	7	11	10	10

==== Section 6 ====
First round
(Egypt) Abdel-Aziz	7	16	11	6	9	6
(India) A. Mukherjee	11	14	8	11	11	11
(Ukraine) Gaponova	7	7	11	10	3
(Thailand) J. Sawettabut	11	11	6	12	11
(Croatia) Jeger	4	10	11	11	3	5
27	(Egypt) Meshref	11	12	9	9	11	11
31	(Luxembourg) Ni	11	11	11	11
(Italy) Laurenti	4	3	2	5
(Croatia) Malobabić	11	7	11	11	11
(Portugal) Oliveira	6	11	2	8	5
(Czech Republic) Tomanovska	6	11	12	4	1	7
(South Korea) Lee	11	7	10	11	11	11

Second round
15	(Japan) Hayata	11	11	11	11
(India) A. Mukherjee	5	4	3	4
(Thailand) J. Sawettabut	7	8	7	11	9
27	(Egypt) Meshref	11	11	11	0	11
31	(Luxembourg) Ni	11	11	11	11
(Croatia) Malobabić	1	4	4	4
(South Korea) Lee	11	4	7	9
7	(China) Wang Y.	13	11	11	11

Third round
15	(Japan) Hayata	11	4	11	11	11
27	(Egypt) Meshref	6	11	9	7	2
31	(Luxembourg) Ni	9	8	7	7
7	(China) Wang Y.	11	11	11	11

Fourth round
15	(Japan) Hayata	4	6	15	6	20	5
7	(China) Wang Y.	11	11	13	11	18	11

==== Section 7 ====
First round
(Chinese Taipei) Li	11	11	10	14	10	10	13
(Puerto Rico) M. Díaz	6	8	12	12	12	12	11
(Turkey) Yılmaz	6	4	4	12	9
(Sweden) Källberg	11	11	11	10	11
(Russia) Mikhailova	10	12	8	9	11	5
18	(South Korea) Suh	12	10	11	11	5	11
26	(United States) Zhang	12	12	11	11
(Hungary) Hartbrich	10	10	3	8
(Serbia) Todorović	11	11	12	11
(Argentina) Codina	9	4	10	9
(Wales) Carey	5	2	11	2	13
(Germany) Winter	11	11	4	11	15
(Nigeria) Edem	3	5	2	4
10	(Hong Kong) Doo	11	11	11	11

Second round
8	(Singapore) Feng	7	9	13	11	11	11
(Chinese Taipei) Li	11	11	11	8	9	7
(Sweden) Källberg	14	5	7	6
18	(South Korea) Suh	16	11	11	11
26	(United States) Zhang	11	13	11	7	10	11
(Serbia) Todorović	8	11	2	11	12	7
(Germany) Winter	9	9	5	11	8
10	(Hong Kong) Doo	11	11	11	6	11

Third round
8	(Singapore) Feng	9	11	9	11	11	8	8
18	(South Korea) Suh	11	3	11	4	6	11	11
26	(United States) Zhang	9	11	11	11	6	11	9
10	(Hong Kong) Doo	11	9	13	9	11	6	11

Fourth round
18	(South Korea) Suh	11	11	10	11	11
10	(Hong Kong) Doo	9	9	12	9	9

==== Section 8 ====
First round
14	(Puerto Rico) A. Díaz	11	11	11	11
(Greece) Toliou	3	7	5	3
(Algeria) Kessaci	9	3	4	9
(Slovakia) Kukuľková	11	11	11	11
(Chile) Morales	9	6	10	5
(Hong Kong) Lee	11	11	12	11
(France) Zarif	5	7	6	7
20	(Chinese Taipei) Chen	11	11	11	11
17	(Germany) Han	11	11	11	11
(Switzerland) Moret	5	3	4	2
(Belarus) Trigolos	11	8	12	8	11	11
(Spain) Dvorak	8	11	10	11	8	4
(Brazil) Kumahara	5	11	3	11	11
(Hong Kong) Ng	11	9	11	13	13

Second round
14	(Puerto Rico) A. Díaz	11	11	11	11
(Slovakia) Kukuľková	4	4	4	2
(Hong Kong) Lee	11	11	7	9	11	9	2
20	(Chinese Taipei) Chen	2	9	11	11	6	11	11
17	(Germany) Han	11	11	11	11
(Belarus) Trigolos	6	4	3	8
(Hong Kong) Ng	4	2	9	3
2	(China) Sun	11	11	11	11

Third round
14	(Puerto Rico) A. Díaz	12	8	11	11	4	11
20	(Chinese Taipei) Chen	10	11	9	9	11	5
17	(Germany) Han	6	10	4	8
2	(China) Sun	11	12	11	11

Fourth round
14	(Puerto Rico) A. Díaz	4	8	8	11	11	4
2	(China) Sun	11	11	11	9	9	11
