= 2014 Asian Junior and Cadet Table Tennis Championships =

Tournament details
- Dates: 12–16 September 2014
- Edition: 20th
- Venue: Sardar Vallabhbhai Patel, National Sports Club of India
- Location: Mumbai, India

The Reliance 20th Asian Junior and Cadet Table Tennis Championships 2014 were held in Mumbai, India, from 12 to 16 September 2014. It was organised by the Table Tennis Federation of India under the authority of the Asian Table Tennis Union (ATTU). It was also a qualification stage for the 2014 World Junior Table Tennis Championships.

== Medal summary ==
=== Events ===
| Event | Gold | Silver | Bronze |
|---|---|---|---|
| Junior boys' singles | China; Yu Ziyang | China; Liang Jingkun | China; Zhou Qihao |
| Junior boys' singles | China; Yu Ziyang | China; Liang Jingkun | South Korea; Kim Minhyeok |
| Junior girls' singles | China; Chen Xingtong | China; Wang Manyu | China; Liu Gaoyang |
| Junior girls' singles | China; Chen Xingtong | China; Wang Manyu | Hong Kong; Doo Hoi Kem |
| Junior boys' doubles | Japan; Kazuhiro Yoshimura; Yuma Tsuboi | Japan; Asuka Sakai; Yuto Kizukuri | Hong Kong; Ho Kwan Kit; Hung Ka Tak |
| Junior boys' doubles | Japan; Kazuhiro Yoshimura; Yuma Tsuboi | Japan; Asuka Sakai; Yuto Kizukuri | South Korea; Lim Jonghoon; Park Jeongwoo |
| Junior girls' doubles | China; Wang Manyu; Chen Ke | China; Liu Gaoyang; Chen Xingtong | South Korea; Lee Zion; Lee Seul |
| Junior girls' doubles | China; Wang Manyu; Chen Ke | China; Liu Gaoyang; Chen Xingtong | North Korea; Kim Jin Hyang; Ko Un Gum |
| Junior mixed doubles | Chinese Taipei; Sun Chia-Hung; Chiu Ssu-Hua | Hong Kong; Ho Kwan Kit; Doo Hoi Kem | Chinese Taipei; Liao Cheng-Ting; Huang Yu-Chiao |
| Junior mixed doubles | Chinese Taipei; Sun Chia-Hung; Chiu Ssu-Hua | Hong Kong; Ho Kwan Kit; Doo Hoi Kem | North Korea; Kim Ok Chan; Kim Jinju |
| Junior boys' team | China; Yu Ziyang; Zhou Qihao; Liang Jingkun; Lyu Xiang | South Korea; Cho Seungmin; Kim Minhyeok; Lim Jonghoon; Park Jeongwoo | Chinese Taipei; Liao Cheng-Ting; Sun Chia-Hung; Yang Heng-Wei; Wang Tai-Wei |
| Junior boys' team | China; Yu Ziyang; Zhou Qihao; Liang Jingkun; Lyu Xiang | South Korea; Cho Seungmin; Kim Minhyeok; Lim Jonghoon; Park Jeongwoo | Hong Kong; Ho Kwan Kit; Kwan Man Ho; Hung Ka Tak; Li Hon Ming |
| Junior girls' team | China; Liu Gaoyang; Wang Manyu; Chen Xingtong; Chen Ke | Japan; Miyu Kato; Hitomi Sato; Sakura Mori; Miyu Maeda | South Korea; Lee Zion; Lee Seul; Lee Yujin; Park Seri |
| Junior girls' team | China; Liu Gaoyang; Wang Manyu; Chen Xingtong; Chen Ke | Japan; Miyu Kato; Hitomi Sato; Sakura Mori; Miyu Maeda | Hong Kong; Doo Hoi Kem; Soo Wai Yam Minnie; Lam Yee Lok; Liu Qi |
| Cadet boys' singles | South Korea; An Jaehyun | South Korea; Hwang Minha | Chinese Taipei; Lin Yun-Ju |
| Cadet boys' singles | South Korea; An Jaehyun | South Korea; Hwang Minha | Japan; Yuto Kizukuri |
| Cadet girls' singles | China; Sun Yingsha | China; Mu Jingyu | China; Qian Tianyi |
| Cadet girls' singles | China; Sun Yingsha | China; Mu Jingyu | Japan; Miu Hirano |
| Cadet boys' team | South Korea; An Jaehyun; Kim Daewoo; Hwang Minha | Chinese Taipei; Lin Yun-Ju; Chen Chun-Hsiang; Li Hsin-Yang | China; Xu Yingbin; Kong Lingxuan; Liang Jingkun |
| Cadet boys' team | South Korea; An Jaehyun; Kim Daewoo; Hwang Minha | Chinese Taipei; Lin Yun-Ju; Chen Chun-Hsiang; Li Hsin-Yang | Japan; Yuto Kizukuri; Takuto Izumo; Yukiya Uda |
| Cadet girls' team | Japan; Miu Hirano; Mima Ito; Hina Hayata | China; Mu Jingyu; Sun Yingsha; Qian Tianyi | Hong Kong; Lee Ka Yee Karisa; Leung Ka Wan; Ng Ka Man |
| Cadet girls' team | Japan; Miu Hirano; Mima Ito; Hina Hayata | China; Mu Jingyu; Sun Yingsha; Qian Tianyi | South Korea; Kim Jiho; Kim Youjin; Wee Yeji |

=== Medal table ===
| Rank | Nation | Gold | Silver | Bronze | Total |
|---|---|---|---|---|---|
| 1 | China | 6 | 5 | 4 | 15 |
| 2 | South Korea | 2 | 2 | 5 | 9 |
| 3 | Japan | 2 | 2 | 3 | 7 |
| 4 | Chinese Taipei | 1 | 1 | 3 | 5 |
| 5 | Hong Kong | 0 | 1 | 5 | 6 |
| 6 | North Korea | 0 | 0 | 2 | 2 |
| Totals (6 entries) | | 11 | 11 | 22 | 44 |

== See also ==
- 2014 World Junior Table Tennis Championships
- Asian Table Tennis Championships
- Asian Table Tennis Union
