= 2017 Asian Junior and Cadet Table Tennis Championships =

Tournament details
- Dates: 29 June – 4 July 2017
- Edition: 23rd
- Venue: Yi Sun-Sin Gymnasium
- Location: Asan, Republic of Korea

The 2017 Asian Junior and Cadet Table Tennis Championships were held in Asan, Republic of Korea, from 29 June to 4 July 2017. It was organised by the Korea Table Tennis Association under the authority of the Asian Table Tennis Union (ATTU).

== Medal summary ==
=== Events ===
Event	Gold	Silver	Bronze
Junior boys' singles	China; Wang Chuqin	Japan; Yuto Kizukuri	China; Xu Yingbin
Junior boys' singles	China; Wang Chuqin	Japan; Yuto Kizukuri	Japan; Shunsuke Togami
Junior girls' singles	China; Sun Yingsha	China; Qian Tianyi	China; Shi Xunyao
Junior girls' singles	China; Sun Yingsha	China; Qian Tianyi	China; Liu Weishan
Junior boys' doubles	South Korea; An Jaehyun; Hwang Minha	Chinese Taipei; Lin Yun-Ju; Li Hsin-Yang	China; Xu Yingbin; Yu Heyi
Junior boys' doubles	South Korea; An Jaehyun; Hwang Minha	Chinese Taipei; Lin Yun-Ju; Li Hsin-Yang	Japan; Yukiya Uda; Shunsuke Togami
Junior girls' doubles	China; Sun Yingsha; Qian Tianyi	China; Shi Xunyao; Liu Weishan	Japan; Miyuu Kihara; Yuka Minagawa
Junior girls' doubles	China; Sun Yingsha; Qian Tianyi	China; Shi Xunyao; Liu Weishan	South Korea; Kim Jiho; Kang Dayeon
Junior mixed doubles	China; Wang Chuqin; Sun Yingsha	China; Xue Fei; Qian Tianyi	Hong Kong; Tsang Tsz Tsun; Wong Chin Yau
Junior mixed doubles	China; Wang Chuqin; Sun Yingsha	China; Xue Fei; Qian Tianyi	Chinese Taipei; Lin Yun-Ju; Su Pei-Ling
Junior boys' team	China; Wang Chuqin; Xue Fei; Xu Yingbin; Yu Heyi	South Korea; Hwang Minha; An Jaehyun; Baek Hogyun; Cho Daeseong	India; Manav Vikash Thakkar; Parth Virmani; Manush Utpalbhai Shah; Jeet Chandra
Junior boys' team	China; Wang Chuqin; Xue Fei; Xu Yingbin; Yu Heyi	South Korea; Hwang Minha; An Jaehyun; Baek Hogyun; Cho Daeseong	Chinese Taipei; Lin Yun-Ju; Feng Yi-Hsin; Li Hsin-Yang; Chen Chun-Hsiang
Junior girls' team	China; Sun Yingsha; Qian Tianyi; Shi Xunyao; Liu Weishan	Japan; Asuka Sasao; Miyu Nagasaki; Miyuu Kihara; Yuka Minagawa	Hong Kong; Wong Chin Yau; Fung Wai Chu; Wang Liyong; Leung Ka Wan
Junior girls' team	China; Sun Yingsha; Qian Tianyi; Shi Xunyao; Liu Weishan	Japan; Asuka Sasao; Miyu Nagasaki; Miyuu Kihara; Yuka Minagawa	South Korea; Kim Jiho; Kang Dayeon; Kim Youjin; You Sowon
Cadet boys' singles	China; Niu Guankai	China; Song Zhuoheng	China; Yu Zhengyang
Cadet boys' singles	China; Niu Guankai	China; Song Zhuoheng	Chinese Taipei; Feng Yi-Hsin
Cadet girls' singles	Japan; Yumeno Soma	China; Huang Yingqi	China; Wang Tianyi
Cadet girls' singles	Japan; Yumeno Soma	China; Huang Yingqi	China; Kuai Man
Cadet boys' team	China; Yu Zhengyang; Niu Guankai; Song Zhuoheng	Chinese Taipei; Feng Yi-Hsin; Li Hsin-Yu; Peng Chih	Japan; Kazuki Hamada; Kakeru Sone; Jo Yokotani
Cadet boys' team	China; Yu Zhengyang; Niu Guankai; Song Zhuoheng	Chinese Taipei; Feng Yi-Hsin; Li Hsin-Yu; Peng Chih	South Korea; Kim Jangwonk; Park Gyeongtae; Yang Yechan
Cadet girls' team	China; Wang Tianyi; Kuai Man; Huang Yingqi	South Korea; Shin Yubin; Ryu Hanna; Lee Daeun	Hong Kong; Lee Ka Yee; Chau Wing Sze; NG Wing Lam
Cadet girls' team	China; Wang Tianyi; Kuai Man; Huang Yingqi	South Korea; Shin Yubin; Ryu Hanna; Lee Daeun	Japan; Satsuki Odo; Yumeno Soma; Honami Nakamori

=== Medal table ===
* Host nation (South Korea)

Rank	Nation	Gold	Silver	Bronze	Total
1	China	9	5	7	21
2	Japan	1	2	5	8
3	South Korea*	1	2	3	6
4	Chinese Taipei	0	2	3	5
5	Hong Kong	0	0	3	3
6	India	0	0	1	1
Totals (6 entries)		11	11	22	44

== See also ==
- 2017 World Junior Table Tennis Championships
- Asian Table Tennis Championships
- Asian Table Tennis Union
