= 2025 Asian Table Tennis Championships – Women's team =

Women's team at the 2025 Asian Table Tennis Championships
- Venue: Kalinga-Athletics HPC Building
- Date: 11–15 October 2025
- Competitors: 91 from 20 nations

The women's team in table tennis at the 2025 Asian Table Tennis Championships will be held at Kalinga-Athletics HPC Building from 11 to 15 October 2025.

== Format ==
All matches in the team events will be played as a best-of-five series of individual matches, with the following order of play:

Match 1	Match 2	Match 3	Match 4	Match 5
A vs X	B vs Y	C vs Z	A vs Y	B vs X

The team events are divided into two divisions:

=== First Division ===
- All teams, excluding the top 6 finishers from the 2024 edition, will compete in the 1st Division.
- Teams are divided into groups of 3 or 4.
- The winners of each group advance to First Division semifinal knock-out stage. The winners of semifinal 1 & 2 will be joining in Champions Division, whereas the losers will be playing 9-10th position match.
- Remaining teams play additional matches in a progressive knock-out format to determine final placings. Since there are four groups,
  - Second place of each group will be joining in 11th-14th position bracket.
  - Third place of each group will be joining in 15th-18th position bracket.
  - Fourth place of each group will be joining in 19th-20th position bracket.

=== Champion Division ===
- It consists of:
  - The top 6 teams from the 2024 edition.
  - The 2 winners of First Division semifinal 1 & 2 from the 2025 edition.
- Play begins directly in quarterfinals. Teams lost in quarterfinals will be playing in 5-8th position bracket to determine the seeding for next edition.

== Seeding ==
The seeding was based on ranking on 2024 Asian Table Tennis Championships.

=== Teams playing in Champions Division ===
Seed	Team	Player 1	Player 2	Player 3	Player 4	Player 5
1	Japan	Miwa Harimoto	Honoka Hashimoto	Satsuki Odo	Miyu Nagasaki	Hina Hayata
2	China	Wang Manyu	Wang Yidi	Chen Xingtong	Sun Yingsha	Kuai Man
3-4	India	Sreeja Akula	Swastika Ghosh	Diya Chitale	Manika Batra	Yashaswini Ghorpade
3-4	Hong Kong	Doo Hoi Kem	Ng Wing Lam	Zhu Chengzhu	Kong Tsz Lam	Su Tsz Tung
5	North Korea	Pak Su Gyong	Cha Su Yong	Choe Jong Im	Kim Kum Yong	—
6	South Korea	Lee Eun-hye	Shin Yu-bin	Choi Hyo-joo	Kim Na-yeong	Yang Ha-eun

=== Teams playing in First Division ===
Q= Qualified to the Champions Division

Seed	Team	Player 1	Player 2	Player 3	Player 4	Player 5
7	Thailand (Q)	Jinnipa Sawettabut	Orawan Paranang	Tamolwan Khetkhuan	Suthasini Sawettabut	Wanwisa Aueawiriyayothin
8	Singapore (Q)	Zeng Jian	Tan Zhao Yun	Ser Lin Qian	Lai Chloe	Loy Ming Ying
9	Chinese Taipei	Huang Yi-Hua	Tsai Yun-En	Li Yu-Jhun	Huang Yu-Jie	Huang Yu-Chiao
10	Malaysia	Chang Li Sian	Li Ying Im	Ho Ying	Lyne Karen	Tee Ai Xin
11	Uzbekistan	Guzaloy Abdukahhorova	Maftuna Gulimova	Shoira Kodirova	—	—
12	Iran	Shima Safaei	Saba Seraji	Setayesh Iloukhani	Neda Shahsavari	Fatemeh YariSeraji
13	Kazakhstan	Zauresh Akasheva	Zhanerke Koshkhumbayeva	Sarvinoz Mirkadirova	Albina Zhaxylykova	Anel Bakhyt
14	Mongolia	Bolor-Erdene Batmunkh	Baljinnyam Uvgunburged	Egshiglen Bat-Erdene	—	—
15	Maldives	Aishath Nazim	Aishath Nafiz	Fathimath Ali	Mohamed Ibrahim Mishka	—
16	Sri Lanka	Lesanya Kulappuwawadu	Bimandee Bandara	Shamalsha Halawathage	Tamadi Kavindya Alagiyawadu	—
17	Kyrgyzstan	Saida Kudusova	Raiana Muratalieva	Ramida Abdimitalipova	—	—
18	Macau	Chong Iok Teng	Huang Cheong Leng	Seak Hui Li	Cheong Chi Hun	—
19	Nepal	Evana Thapa	Bianca Rai	Nabita Shrestha	—	—
20	Bangladesh	Mou Sadia	Soma Sonam	Tushi Samanta	Sai Khoy	Oishe Rohman

== First Division ==
=== Group Stage ===
==== Group 1 ====
Pos	Team	Pld	W	L	Pts	Promotion	(Thailand) THA (7)	(Sri Lanka) SRI (16)	(Mongolia) MGL (14)
1	Thailand (7)	2	2	0	4	First Division semifinals	—	3–0	3–0
2	Sri Lanka (16)	2	1	1	3	11-14th position bracket	0–3	—	3–0
3	Mongolia (14)	2	0	2	2	15-18th position bracket	0–3	0–3	—

Source: ITTF

==== Group 2 ====
Pos	Team	Pld	W	L	Pts	Promotion	(Singapore) SGP (8)	(Kazakhstan) KAZ (13)	(Maldives) MDV (15)
1	Singapore (8)	2	2	0	4	First Division semifinals	—	3–0	3–0
2	Kazakhstan (13)	2	1	1	3	11-14th position bracket	0–3	—	3–0
3	Maldives (15)	2	0	2	2	15-18th position bracket	0–3	0–3	—

Source: ITTF

==== Group 3 ====
Pos	Team	Pld	W	L	Pts	Promotion	(Chinese Taipei) TPE (9)	(Macau) MAC (18)	(Uzbekistan) UZB (11)	(Bangladesh) BAN (20)
1	Chinese Taipei (9)	3	3	0	6	First Division semifinals	—	3–0	3–0	3–0
2	Macau, China (18)	3	2	1	5	11-14th position bracket	0–3	—	3–2	3–2
3	Uzbekistan (11)	3	1	2	4	15-18th position bracket	0–3	2–3	—	3–0
4	Bangladesh (20)	3	0	3	3	19-20th position bracket	0–3	2–3	0–3	—

Source: ITTF

==== Group 4 ====
Pos	Team	Pld	W	L	Pts	Promotion	(Malaysia) MAS (10)	(Iran) IRI (12)	(Nepal) NEP (19)	(Kyrgyzstan) KGZ (17)
1	Malaysia (10)	3	3	0	6	First Division semifinals	—	3–0	3–0	3–0
2	Iran (12)	3	2	1	5	11-14th position bracket	0–3	—	3–0	3–0
3	Nepal (19)	3	1	2	4	15-18th position bracket	0–3	0–3	—	3–1
4	Kyrgyzstan (17)	3	0	3	3	19-20th position bracket	0–3	0–3	1–3	—

Source: ITTF

=== Knockout Stage ===
==== First Division Semifinals ====
Semifinals (Winner in semis will be directly qualified to Champions division, and they will not play in final)
7	Thailand	3
9	Chinese Taipei	2
10	Malaysia	0
8	Singapore	3

Advanced to Champions Division
7	Thailand	Q
8	Singapore	Q
9-10th final
9	Chinese Taipei	3
10	Malaysia	2

==== 11-14th position bracket ====
11-14th semifinals
16	Sri Lanka	3
18	Macau, China	1
13	Kazakhstan	1
12	Iran	3

11-12th final
16	Sri Lanka	0
12	Iran	3
13-14th final
18	Macau, China	0
13	Kazakhstan	3

==== 15-18th position bracket ====
15-18th semifinals
11	Uzbekistan	3
15	Maldives	2
14	Mongolia	3
19	Nepal	2

15-16th final
11	Uzbekistan	0
14	Mongolia	3
17-18th final
15	Maldives	1
19	Nepal	3

==== 19-20th position bracket ====
19-20th final
20	Bangladesh	1
17	Kyrgyzstan	3

== Champions Division ==
=== Main bracket ===
Quarterfinals (Teams lost in QF will be joining in 5-8th bracket)
1	Japan	3
5	(North Korea) DPR Korea	2
8	Singapore (Q)	3
4	India	2
3	Hong Kong, China	1
6	(South Korea) Republic of Korea	3
7	Thailand (Q)	0
2	China	3

Semifinals
1	Japan	3
8	Singapore (Q)	0
6	(South Korea) Republic of Korea	0
2	China	3

Final
1	Japan	0
2	China	3

=== 5-8th position bracket ===
5th-8th semifinal
5	(North Korea) DPR Korea	3
4	India	1
3	Hong Kong, China	2
7	Thailand	3

5-6th final
5	(North Korea) DPR Korea	3
7	Thailand	0
7-8th final
4	India	2
3	Hong Kong, China	3

== Final Ranking ==
Position	Team
1	China
2	Japan
3-4	(South Korea) Republic of Korea
3-4	Singapore
5	(North Korea) DPR Korea
6	Thailand
7	Hong Kong, China
8	India
9	Chinese Taipei; Victory in 9-10th Final
10	Malaysia; Defeat in 9-10th Final
11	Iran; Victory in 11-12th Final
12	Sri Lanka; Defeat in 11-12th Final
13	Kazakhstan; Victory in 13-14th Final
14	Macau, China; Defeat in 13-14th Final
15	Mongolia; Victory in 15-16th Final
16	Uzbekistan; Defeat in 15-16th Final
17	Nepal; Victory in 17-18th Final
18	Maldives; Defeat in 17-18th Final
19	Kyrgyzstan; Victory in 19-20th Final
20	Bangladesh; Defeat in 19-20th Final
