= 2023 Asian Table Tennis Championships =

- Date: 3–10 September 2023
- Edition: 26th
- Location: Pyeongchang, Gangwon-do, South Korea
- Venue: Yongpyong Dome
← 2021 ·	Asian Table Tennis Championships	· 2024 →

The 2023 Asian Table Tennis Championships was a table tennis tournament being held in Pyeongchang, South Korea, from 3 to 10 September 2023.

== Medal summary ==
=== Events ===
Event	Gold	Silver	Bronze
Men's singles	(China) Ma Long	(China) Fan Zhendong	(China) Liang Jingkun
Men's singles	(China) Ma Long	(China) Fan Zhendong	(Chinese Taipei) Lin Yun-ju
Women's singles	(China) Wang Manyu	(China) Sun Yingsha	(China) Chen Xingtong
Women's singles	(China) Wang Manyu	(China) Sun Yingsha	(China) Wang Yidi
Men's doubles	(China) Fan Zhendong (China) Lin Gaoyuan	(China) Ma Long (China) Wang Chuqin	(South Korea) Lim Jong-hoon (South Korea) Jang Woo-jin
Men's doubles	(China) Fan Zhendong (China) Lin Gaoyuan	(China) Ma Long (China) Wang Chuqin	(South Korea) Park Gang-hyeon (South Korea) An Jae-hyun
Women's doubles	(China) Chen Meng (China) Wang Manyu	(China) Sun Yingsha (China) Wang Yidi	(Japan) Miyuu Kihara (Japan) Miyu Nagasaki
Women's doubles	(China) Chen Meng (China) Wang Manyu	(China) Sun Yingsha (China) Wang Yidi	(South Korea) Jeon Ji-hee (South Korea) Shin Yu-bin
Mixed doubles	(China) Lin Gaoyuan (China) Wang Yidi	(China) Liang Jingkun (China) Qian Tianyi	(South Korea) Lim Jong-hoon (South Korea) Shin Yu-bin
Mixed doubles	(China) Lin Gaoyuan (China) Wang Yidi	(China) Liang Jingkun (China) Qian Tianyi	(Chinese Taipei) Lin Yun-ju (Chinese Taipei) Chen Szu-yu
Men's team	China; Fan Zhendong; Wang Chuqin; Ma Long; Liang Jingkun; Lin Gaoyuan	Chinese Taipei; Chuang Chih-yuan; Lin Yun-ju; Huang Yan-cheng; Yang Tzu-yi; Kao Cheng-jui	India; Sathiyan Gnanasekaran; Manush Shah; Harmeet Desai; Manav Thakkar; Sharath Kamal
Men's team	China; Fan Zhendong; Wang Chuqin; Ma Long; Liang Jingkun; Lin Gaoyuan	Chinese Taipei; Chuang Chih-yuan; Lin Yun-ju; Huang Yan-cheng; Yang Tzu-yi; Kao Cheng-jui	South Korea; Lim Jong-hoon; An Jae-hyun; Park Gang-hyeon; Jang Woo-jin; Oh Jun-sung
Women's team	China; Chen Xingtong; Chen Meng; Wang Manyu; Sun Yingsha; Wang Yidi	South Korea; Suh Hyo-won; Lee Eun-hye; Jeon Ji-hee; Shin Yu-bin; Yang Ha-eun	Japan; Hitomi Sato; Mima Ito; Hina Hayata; Miu Hirano; Miyuu Kihara
Women's team	China; Chen Xingtong; Chen Meng; Wang Manyu; Sun Yingsha; Wang Yidi	South Korea; Suh Hyo-won; Lee Eun-hye; Jeon Ji-hee; Shin Yu-bin; Yang Ha-eun	Hong Kong; Zhu Chengzhu; Li Ching Wan; Lee Hoi Man Karen; Lee Ho Ching; Doo Hoi Kem

=== Medal table ===
Rank	Nation	Gold	Silver	Bronze	Total
1	China	7	5	3	15
2	South Korea	0	1	5	6
3	Chinese Taipei	0	1	2	3
4	Japan	0	0	2	2
5	Hong Kong	0	0	1	1
5	India	0	0	1	1
Totals (6 entries)		7	7	14	28
