= Table tennis at the 2024 Summer Olympics – Women's team =

Table tennis – women's team at the Games of the XXXIII Olympiad
- Venue: Paris Expo Porte de Versailles
- Date: 5–10 August
- Competitors: 48 from 16 nations
- Teams: 16

Medalists
1st place, gold medalist(s)		Sun Yingsha; Wang Manyu; Chen Meng	China
2nd place, silver medalist(s)		Hina Hayata; Miwa Harimoto; Miu Hirano	Japan
3rd place, bronze medalist(s)		Shin Yu-bin; Jeon Ji-hee; Lee Eun-hye	South Korea

The women's team table tennis event was part of the table tennis programme at the 2024 Summer Olympics in Paris. The event took place from 5 to 10 August 2024 at Paris Expo Porte de Versailles.

This was the event's last appearance before it was replaced with women's doubles event at LA 2028, marking the event's return for the first time since Athens 2004.

== Format ==
Teams were made up of three players. Each team match was made up of five individual matches and ended when either side has won three matches. The order of a team match was as follows: a doubles match, two singles matches, and if neither side had won three matches by this point, a maximum of two extra singles matches were played.

Order of a team match
		ABC team	vs	XYZ team
1	Doubles	B + C	vs	Y + Z
2	Singles	A	vs	X
3	Singles	C	vs	Z
4	Singles	A	vs	Y
5	Singles	B	vs	X

== Schedule ==
Legend
P	Preliminary round	¼	Quarter-finals	½	Semi-finals	F	Final

Mon 5	Tue 6		Wed 7	Thu 8	Fri 9	Sat 10
P	P	¼	¼	½		F

== Draw ==
The draw was held on 24 July 2024.

== Seeds ==
The ITTF world team ranking published on 16 July 2024 was used for seeding purposes.

Rank	Team	Athletes (world ranking on 16 July 2024)		
1	China	Sun Yingsha (1)	Wang Manyu (2)	Chen Meng (4)
2	Japan	Hina Hayata (5)	Miwa Harimoto (7)	Miu Hirano (13)
3	South Korea	Shin Yu-bin (8)	Jeon Ji-hee (14)	Lee Eun-hye (42)
4	Romania	Bernadette Szőcs (10)	Elizabeta Samara (43)	Adina Diaconu (63)
5	Germany	Shan Xiaona (40)	Yuan Wan (89)	Annett Kaufmann (94)
6	Hong Kong	Doo Hoi Kem (47)	Zhu Chengzhu (61)	Lee Ho Ching (64)
7	Chinese Taipei	Cheng I-ching (12)	Chien Tung-chuan (46)	Chen Szu-yu (60)
8	France	Prithika Pavade (18)	Jia Nan Yuan (19)	Charlotte Lutz (77)
9	Egypt	Dina Meshref (26)	Hana Goda (32)	Mariam Alhodaby (56)
10	Brazil	Bruna Takahashi (20)	Giulia Takahashi (90)	Bruna Costa Alexandre (181)
11	India	Sreeja Akula (25)	Manika Batra (28)	Archana Kamath (123)
12	Poland	Natalia Bajor (48)	Zuzanna Wielgos (156)	Anna Węgrzyn (188)
13	Thailand	Orawan Paranang (36)	Suthasini Sawettabut (55)	Jinnipa Sawettabut (111)
14	United States	Lily Zhang (29)	Amy Wang (38)	Rachel Sung (249)
15	Sweden	Linda Bergström (34)	Christina Källberg (58)	Filippa Bergand (167)
16	Australia	Min Hyung Jee (59)	Michelle Bromley (107)	Melissa Tapper (251)

== Bracket ==
First round
1	China	3
9	Egypt	0
16	Australia	0
7	Chinese Taipei	3
6	Hong Kong	2
15	Sweden	3
10	Brazil	1
3	South Korea	3
4	Romania	2
11	India	3
14	United States	2
5	Germany	3
8	France	2
13	Thailand	3
12	Poland	0
2	Japan	3

Quarterfinals
1	China	3
7	Chinese Taipei	0
15	Sweden	0
3	South Korea	3
11	India	1
5	Germany	3
13	Thailand	0
2	Japan	3

Semifinals
1	China	3
3	South Korea	0
5	Germany	1
2	Japan	3

Gold medal match
1	China	3
2	Japan	0
Bronze medal match
3	South Korea	3
5	Germany	0

== Results ==
All times are local (UTC+2).

=== First round ===
5 August 2024; 10:00	Poland	0–3	Japan

Report	Individual matches
Zuzanna Wielgos / Natalia Bajor	1–3	Hina Hayata / Miu Hirano	5–11, 11–5, 9–11, 10–12
Anna Węgrzyn	0–3	Miwa Harimoto	7–11, 4–11, 4–11
Natalia Bajor	0–3	Miu Hirano	3–11, 6–11, 6–11

5 August 2024; 10:00	Romania	2–3	India

Report	Individual matches
Adiana Diaconu / Elizabeta Samara	0–3	Sreeja Akula / Archana Kamath	9–11, 10–12, 7–11
Bernadette Szőcs	0–3	Manika Batra	5–11, 7–11, 7–11
Elizabeta Samara	3–2	Sreeja Akula	8–11, 11–4, 7–11, 11–6, 11–8
Bernadette Szőcs	3–1	Archana Kamath	11–5, 8–11, 11–7, 11–9
Adiana Diaconu	0–3	Manika Batra	5–11, 9–11, 9–11

5 August 2024; 15:00	China	3–0	Egypt

Report	Individual matches
Chen Meng / Wang Manyu	3–0	Mariam Alhodaby / Hana Goda	11–5, 11–2, 11–3
Sun Yingsha	3–1	Dina Meshref	11–5, 11–4, 8–11, 11–7
Wang Manyu	3–0	Hana Goda	11–4, 11–4, 11–9

5 August 2024; 15:00	France	2–3	Thailand

Report	Individual matches
Charlotte Lutz / Prithika Pavade	1–3	Suthasini Sawettabut / Orawan Paranang	12–14, 6–11, 11–6, 10–12
Jia Nan Yuan	3–0	Jinnipa Sawettabut	11–7, 11–4, 11–8
Prithika Pavade	0–3	Orawan Paranang	10–12, 8–11, 10–12
Jia Nan Yuan	3–0	Suthasini Sawettabut	11–4, 11–8, 14–12
Charlotte Lutz	2–3	Jinnipa Sawettabut	8–11, 12–10, 8–11, 11–5, 11–13

5 August 2024; 20:00	Brazil	1–3	South Korea

Report	Individual matches
Bruna Costa Alexandre / Giulia Takahashi	0–3	Shin Yu-bin / Jeon Ji-hee	6–11, 5–11, 8–11
Bruna Takahashi	3–2	Lee Eun-hye	11–8, 9–11, 9–11, 11–8, 11–8
Giulia Takahashi	0–3	Jeon Ji-hee	7–11, 4–11, 2–11
Bruna Costa Alexandre	0–3	Lee Eun-hye	8–11, 5–11, 6–11

5 August 2024; 20:00	Hong Kong	2–3	Sweden

Report	Individual matches
Lee Ho Ching / Doo Hoi Kem	3–2	Filippa Bergand / Christina Källberg	9–11，5–11，11–9，11–4，11–8
Zhu Chengzhu	2–3	Linda Bergström	9–11，14–16，12–10，11–5，7–11
Doo Hoi Kem	2–3	Christina Källberg	11–5，11–5，8–11，3–11，10–12
Zhu Chengzhu	3–0	Filippa Bergand	11–8，11–4，11–6
Lee Ho Ching	0–3	Linda Bergström	5–11，6–11，10–12

6 August 2024; 10:00	United States	2–3	Germany

Report	Individual matches
Rachel Sung / Amy Wang	0–3	Wan Yuan / Shan Xiaona	7–11, 8–11, 6–11
Lily Zhang	0–3	Annett Kaufmann	6–11, 6–11, 5–11
Amy Wang	3–1	Shan Xiaona	11–9, 11–5, 7–11, 11–6
Lily Zhang	3–1	Wan Yuan	11–5, 9–11, 11–5, 11–6
Rachel Sung	1–3	Annett Kaufmann	11–6, 4–11, 9–11, 8–11

6 August 2024; 10:00	Australia	0–3	Chinese Taipei

Report	Individual matches
Michelle Bromley / Melissa Tapper	0–3	Chien Tung-chuan / Chen Szu-yu	4–11, 3–11, 7–11
Minhyung Jee	0–3	Cheng I-ching	5–11, 7–11, 4–11
Melissa Tapper	2–3	Chen Szu-yu	11–6, 5–11, 11–9, 9–11, 6–11

=== Quarterfinals ===
6 August 2024; 15:00	Sweden	0–3	South Korea

Report	Individual matches
Filippa Bergand / Christina Källberg	0–3	Shin Yu-bin / Jeon Ji-hee	2–11, 7–11, 5–11
Linda Bergström	1–3	Lee Eun-hye	11–2, 4–11, 10–12, 11–13
Christina Källberg	1–3	Jeon Ji-hee	11–8, 11–13, 6–11, 7–11

6 August 2024; 20:00	Japan	3–0	Thailand

Report	Individual matches
Hina Hayata / Miu Hirano	3–0	Suthasini Sawettabut / Orawan Paranang	11–7, 11–6, 11–5
Miwa Harimoto	3–0	Jinnipa Sawettabut	12–10, 11–5, 11–9
Miu Hirano	3–0	Orawan Paranang	11–8, 11–5, 11–6

7 August 2024; 10:00	India	1–3	Germany

Report	Individual matches
Sreeja Akula / Archana Kamath	1–3	Yuan Wan / Shan Xiaona	5–11, 11–8, 10–12, 6–11
Manika Batra	1–3	Annett Kaufmann	11–8, 5–11, 7–11, 5–11
Archana Kamath	3–1	Shan Xiaona	19–17, 1–11, 11–5, 11–9
Sreeja Akula	0–3	Annett Kaufmann	6–11, 7–11, 7–11

7 August 2024; 15:00	China	3–0	Chinese Taipei

Report	Individual matches
Chen Meng / Wang Manyu	3–0	Chen Szu-yu / Chien Tung-chuan	11–6, 11–4, 11–7
Sun Yingsha	3–0	Cheng I-ching	11–9, 11–2, 11–8
Wang Manyu	3–0	Chien Tung-chuan	11–7, 11–8, 11–4

=== Semifinals ===
8 August 2024; 15:00	China	3–0	South Korea

Report	Individual matches
Chen Meng / Wang Manyu	3–1	Shin Yu-bin / Jeon Ji-hee	11–4, 11–5, 9–11, 11–9
Sun Yingsha	3–0	Lee Eun-hye	11–5, 11–1, 11–3
Wang Manyu	3–0	Jeon Ji-hee	11–3, 11–7, 11–3

8 August 2024; 20:00	Japan	3–1	Germany

Report	Individual matches
Hina Hayata / Miu Hirano	3–1	Shan Xiaona / Yuan Wan	11–3, 11–3, 6–11, 11–8
Miwa Harimoto	0–3	Annett Kaufmann	9–11, 8–11, 8–11
Miu Hirano	3–0	Yuan Wan	11–7, 11–6, 11–9
Miwa Harimoto	3–0	Shan Xiaona	11–8, 11–5, 11–0

=== Bronze medal game ===
10 August 2024; 10:00	Germany	0–3	South Korea

Report	Individual matches
Yuan Wan / Shan Xiaona	2–3	Shin Yu-bin / Jeon Ji-hee	6–11, 8–11, 11–8, 12–10, 8–11
Annett Kaufmann	0–3	Lee Eun-hye	8–11, 9–11, 2–11
Shan Xiaona	0–3	Jeon Ji-hee	6–11, 6–11, 6–11

=== Gold medal game ===
10 August 2024; 15:00	China	3–0	Japan

Report	Individual matches
Chen Meng / Wang Manyu	3–2	Hina Hayata / Miwa Harimoto	9–11, 11–6, 6–11, 11–6, 12–10
Sun Yingsha	3–0	Miu Hirano	13–11, 11–6, 11–6
Wang Manyu	3–1	Miwa Harimoto	12–14, 12–10, 11–7, 11–6
