= 2025 Asian Table Tennis Championships =

- Date: 11–15 October 2025
- Edition: 28th
- Location: Bhubaneswar, India
- Venue: Kalinga-Athletics HPC Building

Champions

Men's team
- China

Women's team
- China
- Asian Table Tennis Championships

The 2025 Asian Table Tennis Championships was a table tennis tournament held in Bhubaneswar, India from 11 to 15 October 2025. This was the first edition where only team events were played.

== Medalists ==
Event	Gold	Silver	Bronze
Men's team	(China) China; Wang Chuqin; Lin Shidong; Liang Jingkun; Xiang Peng; Zhou Qihao	(Hong Kong) Hong Kong; Wong Chun Ting; Chan Baldwin; Lam Siu Hang; Yiu Kwan To; Ho Kwan Kit	(Japan) Japan; Tomokazu Harimoto; Sora Matsushima; Shunsuke Togami; Hiroto Shinozuka; Yuta Tanaka
Men's team	(China) China; Wang Chuqin; Lin Shidong; Liang Jingkun; Xiang Peng; Zhou Qihao	(Hong Kong) Hong Kong; Wong Chun Ting; Chan Baldwin; Lam Siu Hang; Yiu Kwan To; Ho Kwan Kit	(Chinese Taipei) Chinese Taipei; Kuo Guan-Hong; Liao Cheng-Ting; Chang Yu-An; Lin Yen-Chun
Women's team	(China) China; Sun Yingsha; Wang Manyu; Chen Xingtong; Kuai Man; Wang Yidi	(Japan) Japan; Miwa Harimoto; Satsuki Odo; Honoka Hashimoto; Hina Hayata; Miyu Nagasaki	(South Korea) Korea Republic; Shin Yu-bin; Kim Na-yeong; Lee Eun-hye; Choi Hyo-joo; Yang Ha-eun
Women's team	(China) China; Sun Yingsha; Wang Manyu; Chen Xingtong; Kuai Man; Wang Yidi	(Japan) Japan; Miwa Harimoto; Satsuki Odo; Honoka Hashimoto; Hina Hayata; Miyu Nagasaki	(Singapore) Singapore; Zeng Jian; Tan Zhao Yun; Loy Ming Ying; Ser Lin Qian; Lai Chloe
