= Table tennis at the 2022 Asian Games – Women's singles =

Women's singles at the 2022 Asian Games
- Venue: Gongshu Canal Sports Park Gymnasium
- Date: 27 September – 1 October 2023
- Competitors: 39 from 21 nations

Medalists
gold medal	Sun Yingsha	China
silver medal	Hina Hayata	Japan
bronze medal	Shin Yu-bin	South Korea
bronze medal	Wang Yidi	China

The women's singles table tennis event at the 2022 Asian Games took place from 27 September to 1 October 2023 at the Gongshu Canal Sports Park Gymnasium.

== Schedule ==
All times are China Standard Time (UTC+08:00)

Date	Time	Event
Wednesday, 27 September 2023	12:15	Round of 64
Thursday, 28 September 2023	11:00	Round of 32
Friday, 29 September 2023	10:00	Round of 16
Saturday, 30 September 2023	12:00	Quarterfinals
Sunday, 1 September 2018	13:30	Semifinals
Sunday, 1 September 2018	19:45	Final

== Results ==
=== Finals ===
Quarterfinals
1	Sun Yingsha (CHN)	11	11	11	9	12
Pyon Song-gyong (PRK)	5	6	3	11	10
10	Chen Szu-yu (TPE)	11	9	7	7	3
3	Shin Yu-bin (KOR)	6	11	11	11	11
4	Hina Hayata (JPN)	7	8	11	11	12	11
5	Cheng I-ching (TPE)	11	11	6	9	10	9
8	Manika Batra (IND)	8	12	6	4	14	5
2	Wang Yidi (CHN)	11	10	11	11	12	11

Semifinals
1	Sun Yingsha (CHN)	11	11	14	12
3	Shin Yu-bin (KOR)	7	8	12	10
4	Hina Hayata (JPN)	11	3	11	7	10	15	12
2	Wang Yidi (CHN)	4	11	8	11	12	13	10

Final
1	Sun Yingsha (CHN)	11	11	10	11	11
4	Hina Hayata (JPN)	5	9	12	8	7

=== Top half ===
==== Section 1 ====
Round of 64	Round of 32						Round of 16
	1	Sun Yingsha (CHN)	11	11	11	11
		Hoor Fawad (PAK)	1	1	0	2
							1	Sun Yingsha (CHN)	11	11	11	11
							13	Orawan Paranang (THA)	7	2	5	5
		Mönkhbatyn Undram (MGL)	2	3	6	5
	13	Orawan Paranang (THA)	11	11	11	11

==== Section 2 ====
Round of 64					Round of 32						Round of 16
					15	Sreeja Akula (IND)	6	4	13	9
Pyon Song-gyong (PRK)	12	11	11	11		Pyon Song-gyong (PRK)	11	11	15	11
Anastassiya Lavrova (KAZ)	10	7	5	4								Pyon Song-gyong (PRK)	11	7	12	4	11	11
											6	Miu Hirano (JPN)	7	11	10	11	5	8
						Sikka Suwal Shrestha (NEP)	7	1	4	5
					6	Miu Hirano (JPN)	11	11	11	11

==== Section 3 ====
Round of 64						Round of 32							Round of 16
						7	Doo Hoi Kem (HKG)	11	11	11	11
							Markhabo Magdieva (UZB)	2	9	4	6
													7	Doo Hoi Kem (HKG)	11	7	8	6	8
Cheong Chi Hun (MAC)	11	8	11	11	11								10	Chen Szu-yu (TPE)	9	11	11	11	11
Aishath Rafa Nazim (MDV)	5	11	9	4	9		Cheong Chi Hun (MAC)	3	12	4	4	3
						10	Chen Szu-yu (TPE)	11	10	11	11	11

==== Section 4 ====
Round of 64					Round of 32						Round of 16
					14	Zeng Jian (SGP)	11	11	11	11
Nguyễn Thị Nga (VIE)	11	11	11	11		Nguyễn Thị Nga (VIE)	5	5	4	1
Malak Khoury (LBN)	1	4	6	8							14	Zeng Jian (SGP)	7	9	5	2
											3	Shin Yu-bin (KOR)	11	11	11	11
						Amruta Phadke (BRN)	2	1	4	4
					3	Shin Yu-bin (KOR)	11	11	11	11

=== Bottom half ===
==== Section 5 ====
Round of 64						Round of 32							Round of 16
						4	Hina Hayata (JPN)	11	11	11	11
							Shima Safaei (IRI)	1	4	6	3
													4	Hina Hayata (JPN)	12	11	11	11
Zhou Jingyi (SGP)	11	13	11	11	11									Zhou Jingyi (SGP)	4	2	8	8
Rozalina Khadjieva (UZB)	6	15	4	7	1		Zhou Jingyi (SGP)	7	11	11	11	11
						16	Sarvinoz Mirkadirova (KAZ)	11	6	9	9	7

==== Section 6 ====
Round of 64						Round of 32							Round of 16
						12	Suh Hyo-won (KOR)	11	11	11	11
Mariana Sahakian (LBN)	11	12	11	11	11		Mariana Sahakian (LBN)	3	5	3	8
Haiqa Hassan (PAK)	5	10	7	13	8								12	Suh Hyo-won (KOR)	11	11	5	4	7	9
													5	Cheng I-ching (TPE)	8	9	11	11	11	11
							Kim Kum-yong (PRK)	8	4	11	7	9
						5	Cheng I-ching (TPE)	11	11	5	11	11

==== Section 7 ====
Round of 64					Round of 32						Round of 16
					8	Manika Batra (IND)	11	11	11	11
						Nabita Shrestha (NEP)	5	4	3	2
											8	Manika Batra (IND)	11	6	12	11	12	11
Sumayai Amiri (TJK)	7	8	8	8							9	Suthasini Sawettabut (THA)	7	11	10	13	10	6
Maryam Al-Aali (BRN)	11	11	11	11		Maryam Al-Aali (BRN)	3	2	2	6
					9	Suthasini Sawettabut (THA)	11	11	11	11

==== Section 8 ====
Round of 64								Round of 32							Round of 16
								11	Zhu Chengzhu (HKG)	11	11	11	9	11
Batmönkhiin Bolor-Erdene (MGL)	12	11	9	12	11	11	11		Batmönkhiin Bolor-Erdene (MGL)	5	4	3	11	3
Seak Hui Li (MAC)	14	9	11	14	8	9	4								11	Zhu Chengzhu (HKG)	5	11	6	9
															2	Wang Yidi (CHN)	11	13	11	11
									Nguyễn Khoa Diệu Khánh (VIE)	8	2	7	4
								2	Wang Yidi (CHN)	11	11	11	11
