= 2021 World Table Tennis Championships – Women's doubles =

Women's doubles at the 2021 World Table Tennis Championships
- Venue: George R. Brown Convention Center
- Location: Houston, United States
- Dates: 24–29 November
- Final score: 11–9, 11–7, 11–8

Medalists
| gold medal | Sun Yingsha; Wang Manyu | China |
| silver medal | Mima Ito; Hina Hayata | Japan |
| bronze medal | Chen Meng; Qian Tianyi | China |
| bronze medal | Ni Xialian; Sarah de Nutte | Luxembourg |

The women's doubles competition of the 2021 World Table Tennis Championships was held from 24 to 29 November 2021.

Sun Yingsha and Wang Manyu defeated Mima Ito and Hina Hayata 11–9, 11–7, 11–8 in the final.

== Seeds ==
Seeding was based on the ITTF world ranking published on 16 November 2021. Ranking for doubles competitions was determined by combining a pair's individual doubles ranking position to form a combined pair ranking.

1. (South Korea) Jeon Ji-hee / (South Korea) Shin Yu-bin (second round, withdrawn)
2. (Japan) Kasumi Ishikawa / (Japan) Miu Hirano (quarterfinals)
3. (Germany) Nina Mittelham / (Germany) Sabine Winter (third round)
4. (Hong Kong) Doo Hoi Kem / (Hong Kong) Lee Ho Ching (third round)
5. (Sweden) Linda Bergström / (Sweden) Christina Källberg (second round)
6. (Germany) Petrissa Solja / (Germany) Shan Xiaona (third round)
7. (Czech Republic) Hana Matelová / (Slovakia) Barbora Balážová (third round)
8. (Russia) Yana Noskova / (Russia) Olga Vorobeva (third round)
9. (Egypt) Farah Abdelaziz / (Egypt) Yousra Abdel Razek (second round)
10. (India) Manika Batra / (India) Archana Girish Kamath (quarterfinals)
11. (China) Sun Yingsha / (China) Wang Manyu (champions)
12. (Chinese Taipei) Cheng Hsien-tzu / (Chinese Taipei) Liu Hsing-yin (second round)
13. (Puerto Rico) Adriana Díaz / (Puerto Rico) Melanie Díaz (second round)
14. (Chinese Taipei) Chen Szu-yu / (Chinese Taipei) Li Yu-jhun (second round)
15. (Nigeria) Cecilia Akpan / (Nigeria) Offiong Edem (second round, withdrawn)
16. (Austria) Karoline Mischek / (England) Tin-Tin Ho (second round)

== Draw ==
=== Finals ===
Semifinals
(China) Chen Meng (China) Qian Tianyi | 9 | 11 | 12 | 6 | 7
(Japan) Mima Ito (Japan) Hina Hayata | 11 | 2 | 10 | 11 | 11
(Luxembourg) Ni Xialian (Luxembourg) Sarah de Nutte | 4 | 3 | 12
11 | (China) Sun Yingsha (China) Wang Manyu | 11 | 11 | 14

Final
(Japan) Mima Ito (Japan) Hina Hayata | 9 | 7 | 8
11 | (China) Sun Yingsha (China) Wang Manyu | 11 | 11 | 11

=== Top half ===
==== Section 1 ====
First round
(Russia) Abraamian (Russia) Malinina | 11 | 4 | 11 | 10 | 11
(Croatia) Malobabić (Croatia) Jazbec | 9 | 11 | 3 | 12 | 7
(South Korea) Choi (South Korea) Lee | 10 | 11 | 11 | 11
(Portugal) Shao (Portugal) Oliveira | 12 | 0 | 5 | 7
(Slovakia) Kukuľková (Slovakia) Grigelová | 6 | 3 | 4
(China) Chen (China) Qian | 11 | 11 | 11
(United States) J. Sung (United States) R. Sung | 12 | 11 | 4 | 7 | 11
(Turkey) Altınkaya (Turkey) Yılmaz | 10 | 5 | 11 | 11 | 5

Second round
1 | (South Korea) Jeon (South Korea) Shin
(Russia) Abraamian (Russia) Malinina | w/o
(South Korea) Choi (South Korea) Lee | 11 | 11 | 11
13 | (Puerto Rico) A. Díaz (Puerto Rico) M. Díaz | 4 | 7 | 4
15 | (Nigeria) Akpan (Nigeria) Edem
(China) Chen (China) Qian | w/o
(United States) J. Sung (United States) R. Sung | 9 | 11 | 8 | 9
7 | (Czech Republic) Matelová (Slovakia) Balážová | 11 | 2 | 11 | 11

Third round
(Russia) Abraamian (Russia) Malinina | 8 | 9 | 10
(South Korea) Choi (South Korea) Lee | 11 | 11 | 12
(China) Chen (China) Qian | 10 | 12 | 11 | 11
7 | (Czech Republic) Matelová (Slovakia) Balážová | 12 | 10 | 8 | 5

Quarterfinals
(South Korea) Choi (South Korea) Lee | 2 | 1 | 4
(China) Chen (China) Qian | 11 | 11 | 11

==== Section 2 ====
First round
(Chile) Vega (Chile) Ortega | 11 | 7 | 14 | 5
(Argentina) Arguelles (Argentina) Codina | 8 | 11 | 16 | 11
(Japan) Ito (Japan) Hayata | 11 | 12 | 11
(France) Migot (France) Zarif | 4 | 10 | 5
(India) Patkar (India) Mukherjee | 3 | 7 | 4
(Singapore) Goi (Singapore) Wong | 11 | 11 | 11

Second round
8 | (Russia) Noskova (Russia) Vorobeva | 11 | 11 | 11
(Argentina) Arguelles (Argentina) Codina | 7 | 7 | 8
(Romania) Samara (Romania) Dragoman | 11 | 11 | 11
9 | (Egypt) Abdel-Aziz (Egypt) Helmy | 9 | 9 | 4
14 | (Chinese Taipei) Chen (Chinese Taipei) Li | 9 | 7 | 1
(Japan) Ito (Japan) Hayata | 11 | 11 | 11
(Singapore) Goi (Singapore) Wong | 6 | 9 | 0
3 | (Germany) Mittelham (Germany) Winter | 11 | 11 | 11

Third round
8 | (Russia) Noskova (Russia) Vorobeva | 11 | 7 | 7 | 11 | 7
(Romania) Samara (Romania) Dragoman | 5 | 11 | 11 | 5 | 11
(Japan) Ito (Japan) Hayata | 11 | 9 | 11 | 11
3 | (Germany) Mittelham (Germany) Winter | 7 | 11 | 6 | 8

Quarterfinals
(Romania) Samara (Romania) Dragoman | 8 | 8 | 1
(Japan) Ito (Japan) Hayata | 11 | 11 | 11

=== Bottom half ===
==== Section 3 ====
First round
(Brazil) Kumahara (Brazil) Takahashi | 9 | 5 | 4
(France) Yuan (France) Chasselin | 11 | 11 | 11
(Luxembourg) Ni (Luxembourg) De Nutte | 11 | 10 | 11 | 11
(Canada) Xu (Canada) Zhang | 6 | 12 | 4 | 3
(United States) Wu (United States) Zhang | 11 | 8 | 11 | 9 | 7
(Belgium) Degraef (Belgium) Marchetti | 5 | 11 | 7 | 11 | 11
(Serbia) I Lupulesku (Serbia) Šurjan | 9 | 10 | 7
(Hungary) Póta (Hungary) Madarász | 11 | 12 | 11

Second round
4 | (Hong Kong) Doo (Hong Kong) Lee | 11 | 13 | 11
(France) Yuan (France) Chasselin | 8 | 11 | 8
(Luxembourg) Ni (Luxembourg) De Nutte | 11 | 4 | 10 | 11 | 12
12 | (Chinese Taipei) Cheng (Chinese Taipei) Liu | 9 | 11 | 12 | 1 | 10
10 | (India) Batra (India) Kamath | 11 | 11 | 11
(Belgium) Degraef (Belgium) Marchetti | 4 | 7 | 6
(Hungary) Póta (Hungary) Madarász | 9 | 12 | 6 | 12 | 12
5 | (Sweden) Bergström (Sweden) Källberg | 11 | 10 | 11 | 10 | 10

Third round
4 | (Hong Kong) Doo (Hong Kong) Lee | 11 | 7 | 7 | 11 | 8
(Luxembourg) Ni (Luxembourg) De Nutte | 8 | 11 | 11 | 4 | 11
10 | (India) Batra (India) Kamath | 11 | 11 | 6 | 11
(Hungary) Póta (Hungary) Madarász | 4 | 9 | 11 | 7

Quarterfinals
(Luxembourg) Ni (Luxembourg) De Nutte | 11 | 11 | 11
10 | (India) Batra (India) Kamath | 1 | 6 | 8

==== Section 4 ====
First round
(Hong Kong) Ng (Hong Kong) Zhu | 11 | 9 | 11 | 11 | 11
(Spain) Zhang (Spain) Dvorak | 9 | 11 | 13 | 5 | 8
(Thailand) Paranang (Thailand) Sawettabut | 11 | 11 | 11
(Poland) Bajor (Poland) Partyka | 6 | 6 | 4
(Nepal) Shrestha (Nepal) Maharjan
(Austria) Polcanova (Romania) Szőcs | w/o

Second round
6 | (Germany) Solja (Germany) Shan | 12 | 11 | 11
(Italy) Piccolin (Italy) Vivarelli | 10 | 7 | 4
(Hong Kong) Ng (Hong Kong) Zhu | 7 | 7 | 8
11 | (China) Sun (China) Wang | 11 | 11 | 11
16 | (Austria) Mischek (England) Ho | 7 | 9 | 7
(Thailand) Paranang (Thailand) Sawettabut | 11 | 11 | 11
(Austria) Polcanova (Romania) Szőcs | 12 | 8 | 6
2 | (Japan) Ishikawa (Japan) Hirano | 14 | 11 | 11

Third round
6 | (Germany) Solja (Germany) Shan | 18 | 7 | 6 | 9
11 | (China) Sun (China) Wang | 16 | 11 | 11 | 11
(Thailand) Paranang (Thailand) Sawettabut | 4 | 9 | 8
2 | (Japan) Ishikawa (Japan) Hirano | 11 | 11 | 11

Quarterfinals
11 | (China) Sun (China) Wang | 9 | 11 | 11 | 6 | 11
2 | (Japan) Ishikawa (Japan) Hirano | 11 | 7 | 6 | 11 | 4
