= 2021 World Table Tennis Championships – Mixed doubles =

Mixed Doubles at the 2021 World Table Tennis Championships
- Venue: George R. Brown Convention Center
- Location: Houston, United States
- Dates: 23–28 November
- Final score: 11–2, 11–5, 11–8

Medalists
| Wang Chuqin; Sun Yingsha | China |
| Tomokazu Harimoto; Hina Hayata | Japan |
| Lin Yun-ju; Cheng I-ching | Chinese Taipei |
| Lin Gaoyuan; Lily Zhang | China; United States |

The mixed doubles competition of the 2021 World Table Tennis Championships was held from 23 to 28 November 2021.

Xu Xin and Liu Shiwen were the defending champions, but neither competed this year.

Wang Chuqin and Sun Yingsha won the title after defeating Tomokazu Harimoto and Hina Hayata 11–2, 11–5, 11–8.

== Seeds ==
Seeding was based on the ITTF world ranking published on 16 November 2021. Ranking for doubles competitions was determined by combining a pair's individual doubles ranking position to form a combined pair ranking.

1. (Chinese Taipei) Lin Yun-ju / (Chinese Taipei) Cheng I-ching (semifinals)
2. (France) Emmanuel Lebesson / (France) Jia Nan Yuan (quarterfinals)
3. (Hong Kong) Wong Chun Ting / (Hong Kong) Doo Hoi Kem (third round)
4. (South Korea) Jang Woo-jin / (South Korea) Jeon Ji-hee (second round)
5. (Slovakia) Ľubomír Pištej / (Slovakia) Barbora Balážová (second round)
6. (Romania) Ovidiu Ionescu / (Romania) Bernadette Szőcs (third round)
7. (Belarus) Aleksandr Khanin / (Belarus) Daria Trigolos (second round)
8. (Germany) Patrick Franziska / (Germany) Petrissa Solja (third round)
9. (India) Sathiyan Gnanasekaran / (India) Manika Batra (quarterfinals)
10. (Germany) Dang Qiu / (Germany) Nina Mittelham (second round)
11. (Japan) Tomokazu Harimoto / (Japan) Hina Hayata (final)
12. (Egypt) Omar Assar / (Egypt) Dina Meshref (second round)
13. (Hong Kong) Ho Kwan Kit / (Hong Kong) Lee Ho Ching (quarterfinals)
14. (Egypt) Khalid Assar / (Egypt) Yousra Abdel Razek (first round)
15. (China) Wang Chuqin / (China) Sun Yingsha (champions)
16. (Spain) Álvaro Robles / (Spain) María Xiao (quarterfinals)

== Draw ==
=== Finals ===
Semifinals
1 | (Chinese Taipei) Lin Yun-ju (Chinese Taipei) Cheng I-ching | 8 | 11 | 7 | 9
15 | (China) Wang Chuqin (China) Sun Yingsha | 11 | 7 | 11 | 11
11 | (Japan) Tomokazu Harimoto (Japan) Hina Hayata | 11 | 11 | 6 | 8 | 11
(China) Lin Gaoyuan (United States) Lily Zhang | 9 | 1 | 11 | 11 | 2

Final
15 | (China) Wang Chuqin (China) Sun Yingsha | 11 | 11 | 11
11 | (Japan) Tomokazu Harimoto (Japan) Hina Hayata | 2 | 5 | 8

=== Top half ===
==== Section 1 ====
First round
(Sweden) Möregårdh (Sweden) Källberg | 11 | 11 | 11
(Canada) Hazin (Canada) Xu | 7 | 7 | 6
(Turkey) Gündüz (Turkey) Altınkaya | 12 | 11 | 11
(Serbia) Karakašević (Serbia) Lupulesku | 10 | 9 | 7
(Singapore) Pang (Singapore) Lin | 8 | 11 | 11 | 9 | 11
14 | (Egypt) K. Assar (Egypt) Helmy | 11 | 8 | 8 | 11 | 7
(Slovakia) Wang (Slovakia) Kukuľková | 11 | 8 | 1 | 7
(Poland) Badowski (Poland) Bajor | 7 | 11 | 11 | 11
(Nigeria) Omotayo (Nigeria) Akpan
(Chile) Lamadrid (Chile) Vega | w/o

Second round
1 | (Chinese Taipei) Lin (Chinese Taipei) Cheng | 11 | 11 | 12
(Sweden) Möregårdh (Sweden) Källberg | 6 | 8 | 10
(Turkey) Gündüz (Turkey) Altınkaya | 7 | 13 | 7 | 11 | 10
(Singapore) Pang (Singapore) Lin | 11 | 11 | 11 | 10 | 12
13 | (Hong Kong) Ho (Hong Kong) Lee | 11 | 7 | 11 | 11
(Poland) Badowski (Poland) Bajor | 5 | 11 | 6 | 9
(Chile) Lamadrid (Chile) Vega | 5 | 8 | 6
8 | (Germany) Franziska (Germany) Solja | 11 | 11 | 11

Third round
1 | (Chinese Taipei) Lin (Chinese Taipei) Cheng | 11 | 11 | 11
(Singapore) Pang (Singapore) Lin | 8 | 9 | 6
13 | (Hong Kong) Ho (Hong Kong) Lee | 9 | 14 | 11 | 4 | 11
8 | (Germany) Franziska (Germany) Solja | 11 | 12 | 9 | 11 | 9

Quarterfinals
1 | (Chinese Taipei) Lin (Chinese Taipei) Cheng | 11 | 11 | 7 | 11
13 | (Hong Kong) Ho (Hong Kong) Lee | 7 | 7 | 11 | 6

==== Section 2 ====
First round
(South Korea) Cho (South Korea) Shin | 11 | 11 | 11
(United States) Kumar (United States) Wang | 8 | 3 | 6
(Argentina) Alto (Argentina) Codina | 4 | 8 | 12
(Belgium) Lambiet (Belgium) Marchetti | 11 | 11 | 14
(Mexico) Madrid (Mexico) Silva | 9 | 11 | 8 | 2
16 | (Spain) Robles (Spain) Xiao | 11 | 9 | 11 | 11
(Nigeria) Abiodun (Nigeria) Edem | 11 | 1 | 11 | 10 | 11
(Puerto Rico) González (Puerto Rico) M. Díaz | 9 | 11 | 6 | 12 | 4
(Chinese Taipei) Chen C. (Chinese Taipei) Chen S. | 11 | 11 | 11
(Thailand) Tanviriyavechakul (Thailand) Sawettabut | 7 | 9 | 9

Second round
6 | (Romania) Ionescu (Romania) Szőcs | w/o
(South Korea) Cho (South Korea) Shin
(Belgium) Lambiet (Belgium) Marchetti | 3 | 2 | 5
16 | (Spain) Robles (Spain) Xiao | 11 | 11 | 11
15 | (China) Wang C. (China) Sun | 11 | 11 | 11
(Nigeria) Abiodun (Nigeria) Edem | 2 | 7 | 6
(Chinese Taipei) Chen C. (Chinese Taipei) Chen S. | 11 | 11 | 9 | 11
4 | (South Korea) Jang (South Korea) Jeon | 8 | 4 | 11 | 3

Third round
6 | (Romania) Ionescu (Romania) Szőcs | 6 | 11 | 8 | 7
16 | (Spain) Robles (Spain) Xiao | 11 | 8 | 11 | 11
15 | (China) Wang C. (China) Sun | 11 | 11 | 7 | 11
(Chinese Taipei) Chen C. (Chinese Taipei) Chen S. | 7 | 6 | 11 | 6

Quarterfinals
16 | (Spain) Robles (Spain) Xiao | 11 | 6 | 2 | 8
15 | (China) Wang C. (China) Sun | 6 | 11 | 11 | 11

=== Bottom half ===
==== Section 3 ====
First round
(Italy) Stoyanov (Italy) Piccolin | 13 | 14 | 11
(Chile) Gómez (Chile) Ortega | 11 | 12 | 7
(Japan) Uda (Japan) Shibata | 11 | 9 | 11 | 10 | 12
(Canada) Wang (Canada) Zhang | 9 | 11 | 6 | 12 | 10
(Puerto Rico) Afanador (Puerto Rico) A. Díaz | 11 | 11 | 11
(Hungary) Ecseki (Hungary) Madarász | 6 | 5 | 7
(United States) Jha (China) Wang M. | 11 | 19 | 11
(Russia) Sidorenko (Russia) Tailakova | 6 | 17 | 7

Second round
3 | (Hong Kong) Wong (Hong Kong) Doo | 11 | 11 | 11
(Italy) Stoyanov (Italy) Piccolin | 5 | 9 | 6
(Japan) Uda (Japan) Shibata | 11 | 5 | 11 | 6 | 5
11 | (Japan) Harimoto (Japan) Hayata | 4 | 11 | 7 | 11 | 11
9 | (India) Gnanasekaran (India) Batra | 11 | 3 | 11 | 11
(Puerto Rico) Afanador (Puerto Rico) A. Díaz | 6 | 11 | 7 | 0
(United States) Jha (China) Wang M. | 11 | 11 | 12
5 | (Slovakia) Pištej (Slovakia) Balážová | 8 | 9 | 10

Third round
3 | (Hong Kong) Wong (Hong Kong) Doo | 12 | 11 | 9 | 6
11 | (Japan) Harimoto (Japan) Hayata | 14 | 6 | 11 | 11
9 | (India) Gnanasekaran (India) Batra | 15 | 10 | 12 | 11 | 11
(United States) Jha (China) Wang M. | 17 | 12 | 10 | 6 | 7

Quarterfinals
11 | (Japan) Harimoto (Japan) Hayata | 11 | 11 | 7 | 11
9 | (India) Gnanasekaran (India) Batra | 5 | 2 | 11 | 9

==== Section 4 ====
First round
(Russia) Skachkov (Russia) Vorobeva | 7 | 11 | 11 | 9 | 11
(Brazil) Ishiy (Brazil) Takahashi | 11 | 8 | 6 | 11 | 8
(China) Lin (United States) Zhang | 11 | 11 | 11
(Portugal) Apolonia (Portugal) Shao | 6 | 9 | 7
(Czech Republic) Polanský (Czech Republic) Matelová | 14 | 10 | 11 | 6
10 | (Germany) Qiu (Germany) Mittelham | 16 | 12 | 5 | 11
(Algeria) Kherouf (Algeria) Kessaci | 7 | 6 | 6
(India) Achanta (India) Kamath | 11 | 11 | 11
(Poland) Dyjas (Poland) Partyka | 11 | 4 | 12 | 8 | 11
(Argentina) Cifuentes (Argentina) Arguelles | 8 | 11 | 10 | 11 | 9

Second round
7 | (Belarus) Khanin (Belarus) Trigolos | 6 | 11 | 6
(Russia) Skachkov (Russia) Vorobeva | 11 | 13 | 11
(China) Lin (United States) Zhang | 12 | 11 | 11 | 12
10 | (Germany) Qiu (Germany) Mittelham | 14 | 8 | 3 | 10
12 | (Egypt) O. Assar (Egypt) Meshref | 11 | 11 | 5 | 9 | 4
(India) Achanta (India) Kamath | 9 | 2 | 11 | 11 | 11
(Poland) Dyjas (Poland) Partyka | 4 | 5 | 3
2 | (France) Lebesson (France) Yuan | 11 | 11 | 11

Third round
(Russia) Skachkov (Russia) Vorobeva | 9 | 12 | 6 | 5
(China) Lin (United States) Zhang | 11 | 10 | 11 | 11
(India) Achanta (India) Kamath | 4 | 8 | 5
2 | (France) Lebesson (France) Yuan | 11 | 11 | 11

Quarterfinals
(China) Lin (United States) Zhang | 11 | 9 | 11 | 11
2 | (France) Lebesson (France) Yuan | 9 | 11 | 7 | 7
