= Sun Yingsha =

Chinese table tennis player

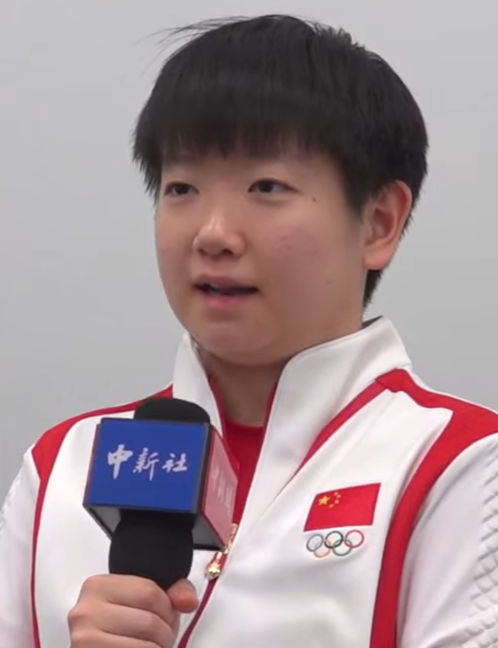
- Sun in 2024

Personal information
- Native name: 孙颖莎
- Born: 4 November 2000 (age 25) Shijiazhuang, Hebei, China
- Height: 1.62 m (5 ft 4 in)

Sport
- Sport: Table tennis
- Playing style: Right-handed, shakehand grip
- Highest ranking: 1 (1 February 2022)
- Current ranking: 2 (12 October 2026)
Medal record
Women's table tennis
Representing China
Event	1st	2nd	3rd
Olympic Games	3	2	0
World Championships	10	1	1
World Cup	7	1	0
WTT Finals	4	0	0
Asian Games	6	0	0
Asian Championships	4	4	0
Asian Cup	1	1	0
Total	35	9	1
Olympic Games
Gold medal – first place	2020 Tokyo	Team
Gold medal – first place	2024 Paris	Mixed doubles
Gold medal – first place	2024 Paris	Team
Silver medal – second place	2020 Tokyo	Singles
Silver medal – second place	2024 Paris	Singles
World Championships
Gold medal – first place	2019 Budapest	Doubles
Gold medal – first place	2021 Houston	Doubles
Gold medal – first place	2021 Houston	Mixed doubles
Gold medal – first place	2022 Chengdu	Team
Gold medal – first place	2023 Durban	Singles
Gold medal – first place	2023 Durban	Mixed doubles
Gold medal – first place	2024 Busan	Team
Gold medal – first place	2025 Doha	Singles
Gold medal – first place	2025 Doha	Mixed doubles
Gold medal – first place	2026 London	Team
Silver medal – second place	2021 Houston	Singles
Bronze medal – third place	2023 Durban	Doubles
World Cup
Gold medal – first place	2019 Tokyo	Team
Gold medal – first place	2023 Chengdu	Mixed team
Gold medal – first place	2024 Macau	Singles
Gold medal – first place	2024 Chengdu	Mixed team
Gold medal – first place	2025 Macau	Singles
Gold medal – first place	2025 Chengdu	Mixed team
Gold medal – first place	2026 Macau	Singles
Silver medal – second place	2020 Weihai	Singles
WTT Finals
Gold medal – first place	2021 Singapore	Singles
Gold medal – first place	2022 Xinxiang	Singles
Gold medal – first place	2023 Nagoya	Singles
Gold medal – first place	2023 Nagoya	Doubles
Asian Games
Gold medal – first place	2018 Jakarta-Palembang	Mixed doubles
Gold medal – first place	2018 Jakarta-Palembang	Team
Gold medal – first place	2022 Hangzhou	Singles
Gold medal – first place	2022 Hangzhou	Mixed doubles
Gold medal – first place	2022 Hangzhou	Team
Gold medal – first place	2026 Aichi-Nagoya	Team
Silver medal – second place	2026 Aichi-Nagoya	Singles
Silver medal – second place	2026 Aichi-Nagoya	Mixed doubles
Asian Championships
Gold medal – first place	2019 Yogyakarta	Singles
Gold medal – first place	2019 Yogyakarta	Team
Gold medal – first place	2023 Pyeongchang	Team
Gold medal – first place	2025 Bhubaneswar	Team
Silver medal – second place	2019 Yogyakarta	Mixed doubles
Silver medal – second place	2023 Pyeongchang	Singles
Silver medal – second place	2023 Pyeongchang	Doubles
Silver medal – second place	2024 Astana	Team
Asian Cup
Gold medal – first place	2026 Haikou	Singles
Silver medal – second place	2025 Shenzhen	Singles
Youth Olympic Games
Gold medal – first place	2018 Buenos Aires	Singles
Gold medal – first place	2018 Buenos Aires	Mixed team
World Junior Championships
Gold medal – first place	2017 Riva del Garda	Singles
Gold medal – first place	2017 Riva del Garda	Doubles
Gold medal – first place	2017 Riva del Garda	Team
Bronze medal – third place	2017 Riva del Garda	Mixed doubles

Sun Yingsha (Chinese: 孙颖莎; pinyin: Sūn Yǐngshā; born 4 November 2000) is a Chinese professional table tennis player and World Champion.

Sun is the reigning Olympic gold medalist in mixed doubles with Wang Chuqin, and in the team event in both Tokyo 2020 and Paris 2024. She is also the reigning World Champion and World Cup Champion in womens' singles.

== Career ==
In January 2017, Sun entered the national table tennis team of China, only sixteen months after being selected for the B team. Sun won gold in the women's singles and mixed team with Wang Chuqin at the 2018 Youth Olympic Games in Buenos Aires, Argentina.

=== 2019 ===
In the 2019 World Team Cup, Sun came back from down 10–7 in the deciding fifth game to defeat Mima Ito in the finals against Japan. In an interview in 2021, Sun referred to this match as her precious match.

=== 2021 ===
Sun started out 2021 as number two in the world rankings. However, after China's decision to withdraw from all international events until the Tokyo Olympics, Mima Ito passed Sun for the number two position in the world rankings. In April, ITTF amended the seeding system for the Olympics such that she would be seeded above Mima Ito.

=== 2023 ===
On October 1, in the women's singles final of the Hangzhou Asian Games, Sun defeated Japan's Hina Hayata 4-1 to win gold. This was also Sun's third gold medal after winning both team and mixed doubles. This marked China's seventh consecutive championship in the women's singles competition at the Asian Games.

=== 2024 ===
At the 2024 Paris Olympics, Sun won the first gold in mixed doubles for the Chinese table tennis team, as well as women's team gold and women's singles silver. At the closing ceremony of Paris 2024 Olympic games, Sun was selected to extinguish the Olympic flame as the representative of the continent of Asia, the first female to be selected for the role.

== Singles titles ==
Year	Tournament	Final opponent	Score	Ref
2017	ITTF World Tour Platinum, Japan Open	(China) Chen Meng	4–1	
2018	Youth Olympic Games	(Japan) Miu Hirano	4–1	
2019	ITTF World Tour Platinum, Japan Open	(China) Liu Shiwen	4–3	
2019	ITTF World Tour Platinum, Australian Open	(China) Ding Ning	4–0	
2019	Asian Championships	(China) Liu Shiwen	3–0	
2019	ITTF World Tour Platinum, German Open	(Japan) Mima Ito	4–1	
2019	T2 Diamond Singapore	(Japan) Mima Ito	4–3	
2021	WTT Cup Finals	(China) Wang Yidi	4–2	
2022	WTT Champions Macao	(China) Chen Xingtong	4–1	
2022	WTT Cup Finals	(China) Chen Meng	4–3	
2023	WTT Singapore Smash	(China) Qian Tianyi	4–1	
2023	WTT Champions Xinxiang	(China) Wang Yidi	4–1	
2023	World Championships	(China) Chen Meng	4–2	
2023	WTT Star Contender Ljubljana	(China) Chen Meng	4–3	
2023	Asian Games	(Japan) Hina Hayata	4–1	
2023	WTT Star Contender Lanzhou	(China) Chen Meng	4–0	
2023	WTT Finals	(China) Wang Yidi	4–2	
2024	WTT Star Contender Doha	(China) Chen Meng	4–1	
2024	WTT Champions Incheon	(China) Wang Manyu	4–0	
2024	World Cup	(China) Wang Manyu	4–3	
2024	WTT Champions Chongqing	(China) Wang Manyu	4–3	
2024	WTT Champions Macao	(China) Wang Yidi	4–2	
2024	WTT China Smash	(China) Wang Manyu	4–2	
2025	WTT Singapore Smash	(China) Kuai Man	4–1	
2025	WTT Champions Chongqing	(China) Chen Xingtong	4–0	
2025	World Cup	(China) Kuai Man	4–0	
2025	World Championships	(China) Wang Manyu	4–3	
2025	WTT Europe Smash - Sweden	(China) Wang Manyu	4–2	
2025	WTT Champions Macao	(China) Wang Manyu	4–3	
2026	Asian Cup	(China) Wang Manyu	4–3	
2026	WTT Singapore Smash	(China) Wang Manyu	4–2	
2026	World Cup	(China) Wang Manyu	4–1	
2026	WTT United States Smash	(China) Kuai Man	4–3	
2026	WTT Champions Montpellier	(China) Kuai Man	4–1	

== Performance timeline ==
W	F	SF	QF	R#	RR	Q#	A	G	S	B	NH	N/A	DNQ

(W) won; (F) finalist; (SF) semi-finalist; (QF) quarter-finalist; (R#) rounds 16, 32, 64, 128; (RR) round-robin stage; (Q#) qualification round; (A) absent; (G) gold, (S) silver or (B) bronze medal; (NH) not held; (N/A) not applicable; (DNQ) did not qualify.

To avoid confusion and double counting, these charts are updated at the conclusion of a tournament or when the player's participation has ended.

=== National team ===
- Women's team

Team events	2018	2019	2020	2021	2022	2023	2024	2025	2026
Olympic Games	NH	NH	NH	G	NH	NH	G	NH	NH
World Championships	A	NH	NH	NH	G	NH	G	NH	G
World Cup	A	G	NH	NH	NH	NH	NH	NH	NH
Asian Games	G	NH	NH	NH	NH	G	NH	NH	
Asian Championships	NH	G	NH	A	NH	G	S	G	

- Girls' team

Team events	2014	2015	2016	2017
World Youth Championships	A	A	A	G
Asian Youth Championships	S	G	G	G
China Jr & Cadet Open	A	W	W	A
Hong Kong Jr & Cadet Open	A	A	W	A

- Mixed team

Team events	2018	2019	2020	2021	2022	2023	2024	2025
World Cup	NH	NH	NH	NH	NH	G	G	G
Youth Olympic Games	G	NH	NH	NH	NH	NH	NH	NH

=== Individual competitions ===
==== Senior level ====
- Women's singles

Tournaments	2019	2020	2021	2022	2023	2024	2025	2026
Olympic Games	NH	NH	S	NH	NH	S	NH	NH
World Championships	QF	NH	S	NH	G	NH	G	NH
World Cup	A	S	NH	NH	NH	G	G	G
Asian Games	NH	NH	NH	NH	G	NH	NH	
Asian Championships	G	NH	A	NH	S	wd	NH	
Asian Cup	A	NH	NH	A	NH	NH	S	G

Tournaments		2017	2018	2019	2020	2021	2022	2023	2024	2025	2026
Year-end Finals		A	A	QF	SF	W	W	W	R16	SF	
WTT Smash	China	World Tour				NH	NH	NH	W	F	
WTT Smash	(European Union) Euro	World Tour				NH	NH	NH	NH	W	
WTT Smash	(Saudi Arabia) Saudi	World Tour				NH	NH	NH	F	NH	NH
WTT Smash	Singapore	World Tour				NH	SF	W	QF	W	W
WTT Smash	United States	World Tour				NH	NH	NH	NH	R16	
WTT Champions	(Hungary) Budapest	World Tour				NH	SF	NH	NH	NH	NH
WTT Champions	(China) Chongqing	World Tour				NH	NH	NH	W	W	QF
WTT Champions	(Germany) Frankfurt	World Tour				NH	NH	SF	A	A	
WTT Champions	(South Korea) Incheon	World Tour				NH	NH	NH	W	A	NH
WTT Champions	Macau	World Tour				NH	W	SF	W	W	
WTT Champions	(China) Xinxiang	World Tour				NH	NH	W	NH	NH	NH
WTT Champions	(Japan) Yokohama	World Tour				NH	NH	NH	NH	F	
WTT Star; Contender	(Hungary) Budapest	World Tour				NH	F	NH	NH	NH	NH
WTT Star; Contender	(Qatar) Doha	World Tour				A	A	NH	W	A	A
WTT Star; Contender	(China) Lanzhou	World Tour				NH	NH	W	NH	NH	NH
WTT Star; Contender	(Slovenia) Ljubljana	World Tour				NH	NH	W	A	A	A
WTT Contender	(Serbia) Zagreb	World Tour				NH	A	F	A	A	
ITTF World Tour	(Australia) Australian Open	A	A	W	NH	WTT Series					
ITTF World Tour	(Austria) Austrian Open	SF	R16	A	NH	WTT Series					
ITTF World Tour	China Open	A	R32	R32	NH	WTT Series					
ITTF World Tour	(Germany) German Open	A	QF	W	QF	WTT Series					
ITTF World Tour	Hong Kong Open	NH	R16	A	NH	WTT Series					
ITTF World Tour	(Hungary) Hungarian Open	A	F	QF	A	WTT Series					
ITTF World Tour	Japan Open	W	A	W	NH	WTT Series					
ITTF World Tour	(South Korea) Korea Open	A	R16	SF	NH	WTT Series					
ITTF World Tour	Qatar Open	A	QF	SF	R16	WTT Series					
ITTF World Tour	(Sweden) Swedish Open	A	Q64	SF	NH	WTT Series					
T2 Diamond	Malaysia	NH	NH	QF	NH	WTT Series					
T2 Diamond	Singapore	NH	NH	W	NH	WTT Series					

- Women's doubles

Tournaments	2019	2020	2021	2022	2023
World Championships	G	NH	G	NH	B
Asian Games	NH	NH	NH	NH	QF
Asian Championships	A	NH	A	NH	S

Tournaments		2017	2018	2019	2020	2021	2022	2023	2024	2025
Year-end Finals		A	F	SF	A	NH	NH	W	QF	NH
WTT Smash	China	World Tour				NH	NH	NH	F	A
WTT Smash	(European Union) Euro	World Tour				NH	NH	NH	NH	W
WTT Smash	Singapore	World Tour				NH	W	W	A	F
WTT Smash	United States	World Tour				NH	NH	NH	NH	F
WTT Star Contender	(Hungary) Budapest	World Tour				NH	W	NH	NH	NH
ITTF World Tour	(Austria) Austrian Open	W	F	NH	NH	WTT Series				
ITTF World Tour	China Open	F	QF	A	NH	WTT Series				
ITTF World Tour	(Germany) German Open	A	A	QF	SF	WTT Series				
ITTF World Tour	Hong Kong Open	NH	W	A	NH	WTT Series				
ITTF World Tour	(Hungary) Hungarian Open	A	NH	F	A	WTT Series				
ITTF World Tour	Japan Open	W	A	F	NH	WTT Series				
ITTF World Tour	Qatar Open	A	F	W	A	WTT Series				
ITTF World Tour	(Sweden) Swedish Open	A	W	QF	NH	WTT Series				

- Mixed doubles

Tournaments	2018	2019	2020	2021	2022	2023	2024	2025	2026
Olympic Games	NH	NH	NH	A	NH	NH	G	NH	NH
World Championships	NH	A	NH	G	NH	G	NH	G	NH
Asian Games	G	NH	NH	NH	NH	G	NH	NH	
Asian Championships	NH	S	NH	A	NH	A	A	NH	

Tournaments		2018	2019	2020	2021	2022	2023	2024	2025	2026
Year-end Finals		A	A	A	NH	NH	NH	NH	F	
WTT Smash	China	World Tour			NH	NH	NH	A	W	
WTT Smash	(Saudi Arabia) Saudi	World Tour			NH	NH	NH	W	NH	NH
WTT Smash	Singapore	World Tour			NH	W	W	W	A	A
WTT Smash	United States	World Tour			NH	NH	NH	NH	A	
WTT Star; Contender	(Qatar) Doha	World Tour			A	A	NH	W	A	A
WTT Star; Contender	(China) Lanzhou	World Tour			NH	NH	SF	NH	NH	NH
WTT Star; Contender	(Slovenia) Ljubljana	World Tour			NH	NH	W	A	A	A
WTT Contender	(Qatar) Doha	World Tour			A	A	A	W	NH	NH
WTT Contender	(China) Taiyuan	World Tour			NH	NH	F	QF	A	A
WTT Contender	(Croatia) Zagreb	World Tour			NH	A	W	A	A	A
ITTF World Tour	(Germany) German Open	A	W	R16	WTT Series					
ITTF World Tour	(South Korea) Korea Open	F	A	NH	WTT Series					
ITTF World Tour	Qatar Open	A	A	F	WTT Series					

==== Junior level ====
- Girls' singles

Tournaments	2014	2015	2016	2017	2018
Youth Olympics	A	NH	NH	NH	G
World Junior Championships	A	A	A	G	A
Asian Junior Championships	A	A	A	G	A
Asian Cadet Championships	G	S	A	A	A
China Junior Open	A	SF	F	A	A
China Cadet Open	A	W	A	A	A
Hong Kong Junior Open	A	A	SF	A	A

- Girls' doubles

Tournaments	2016	2017
World Junior Championships	A	G
Asian Junior Championships	A	G
Hong Kong Junior Open	W	A

- Junior mixed doubles

Tournaments	2017
World Junior Championships	B
Asian Junior Championships	G

== See also ==
- List of Youth Olympic Games gold medalists who won Olympic gold medals
