= 2017 World Junior Table Tennis Championships =

Table tennis tournament in Italy

Tournament details
- Dates: 26 November – 3 December 2017
- Edition: 15th
- Venue: Riva del Garda Expo Fair
- Location: Riva del Garda, Italy

The 2017 World Junior Table Tennis Championships were held in Riva del Garda, Italy, from 26 November to 3 December 2017. It is organised by the Italian Table Tennis Association (FITET) under the auspices and authority of the International Table Tennis Federation (ITTF).

== Medal summary ==
=== Events ===
Event	Gold	Silver	Bronze
Boys' singles	China; Xue Fei	Sweden; Truls Moregard	China; Wang Chuqin
Boys' singles	China; Xue Fei	Sweden; Truls Moregard	China; Niu Guankai
Girls' singles	China; Sun Yingsha	China; Wang Manyu	China; Qian Tianyi
Girls' singles	China; Sun Yingsha	China; Wang Manyu	Japan; Miyu Kato
Boys' doubles	China; Wang Chuqin; Xue Fei	South Korea; An Jaehyun; Baek Hogyun	Japan; Yukiya Uda; Yuta Tanaka
Boys' doubles	China; Wang Chuqin; Xue Fei	South Korea; An Jaehyun; Baek Hogyun	Japan; Masak Takami; Yuto Kizukuri
Girls' doubles	China; Shi Xunyao; Sun Yingsha	China; Qian Tianyi; Wang Manyu	Japan; Miyu Kato; Miyu Nagasaki
Girls' doubles	China; Shi Xunyao; Sun Yingsha	China; Qian Tianyi; Wang Manyu	Japan; Miyuu Kihara; Mitsuho Kimura
Mixed doubles	China; Xue Fei; Wang Manyu	South Korea; An Jaehyun; Kim Jiho	China; Wang Chuqin; Sun Yingsha
Mixed doubles	China; Xue Fei; Wang Manyu	South Korea; An Jaehyun; Kim Jiho	Romania; Cristian Pletea; Adina Diaconu
Boys' team	China; Niu Guankai; Wang Chuqin; Xu Haidong; Xue Fei	Japan; Yukiya Uda; Yuto Kizukuri; Masaki Takami; Yuta Tanaka	South Korea; An Jaehyun; Baek Hogyun; Kim Byunghyeon; Kwak Yu Bin
Boys' team	China; Niu Guankai; Wang Chuqin; Xu Haidong; Xue Fei	Japan; Yukiya Uda; Yuto Kizukuri; Masaki Takami; Yuta Tanaka	Romania; Dragos Florin Oprea; Cristian Pletea; Rares Sipos; Florin Spelbus
Girls' team	China; Qian Tianyi; Shi Xunyao; Sun Yingsha; Wang Manyu	Japan; Miyu Kato; Miyuu Kihara; Mitsuho Kimura; Miyu Nagasaki	South Korea; Kim Jiho; Kim Yealin; Kim Youjin; Shin Yubin
Girls' team	China; Qian Tianyi; Shi Xunyao; Sun Yingsha; Wang Manyu	Japan; Miyu Kato; Miyuu Kihara; Mitsuho Kimura; Miyu Nagasaki	Romania; Adina Diaconu; Andreea Dragoman; Elena Zaharia; Tania Plaian

=== Medal table ===
Rank	Nation	Gold	Silver	Bronze	Total
1	China	7	2	4	13
2	Japan	0	2	5	7
3	South Korea	0	2	2	4
4	Sweden	0	1	0	1
5	Romania	0	0	3	3
Totals (5 entries)		7	7	14	28

== See also ==
- 2017 World Table Tennis Championships
- 2017 ITTF World Tour
