= Table tennis at the 2018 Summer Youth Olympics =

Table tennis at the III Summer Youth Olympic Games
- Venue: Tecnópolis
- Dates: 7–15 October
- No. of events: 3 (1 boys, 1 girls, 1 mixed)

Table tennis at the 2018 Summer Youth Olympics was held from 7 to 15 October. The competition took place at the Tecnópolis in Buenos Aires, Argentina.

== Qualification ==
Each National Olympic Committee (NOC) can enter a maximum of 2 competitors, 1 per each gender. As hosts, Argentina is given the maximum quota should they not qualify an athlete and a further 4 spots, 2 in each gender, will be allocated by the Tripartite Commission. The remaining 58 places shall be decided in three qualification phases; the six continental qualification tournaments, the six “Road to Buenos Aires” events and the Under-18 World Rankings.

To be eligible to participate at the Youth Olympics athletes must have been born between 1 January 2000 and 31 December 2003.

=== Boys ===
Event	Location	Date	Total Places	Qualified
Host Nation	(Argentina) Buenos Aires	15 June 2018	1	Martín Bentancor (ARG)
African Qualification Event	(Tunisia) Tunis	16–17 April 2017	2	Youssef Abdel-Aziz (EGY); Nathael Hamdoun (TUN)
Latin American Qualification Event	(Dominican Republic) Santo Domingo	12–14 May 2017	2	Guilherme Teodoro (BRA); Nicolas Burgos (CHI)
Asian Qualification Event	(India) Greater Noida	3–5 November 2017	4	Wang Chuqin (CHN); Lin Yun-ju (TPE); Tomokazu Harimoto (JPN); Cho Dae-seong (KOR)
European Qualification Event	(Croatia) Split	3–5 November 2017	4	Ioannis Sgouropoulos (GRE); Medardas Stankevičius (LTU); Vladislav Ursu (MDA); Vladimir Sidorenko (RUS)
Oceania Qualification Event	(Australia) Bendigo	11–12 November 2017	1	Nathan Xu (NZL)
North American Qualification Event	(United States) Las Vegas	17 December 2017	1	Kanak Jha (USA)
Road to Buenos Aires – Europe	(Czech Republic) Hodonín	12–13 February 2018	2	Bastien Rembert (FRA); Cristian Pletea (ROU)
Road to Buenos Aires – Africa	(Tunisia) Radès	24–25 March 2018	2	Yu Khinhang (AZE); Amin Ahmadian (IRI)
Road to Buenos Aires – Latin America	(Paraguay) Asunción	14–15 April 2018	2	Matteo Mutti (ITA); Yanapong Panagitgun (THA)
Road to Buenos Aires – Asia	(Thailand) Bangkok	7–8 May 2018	2	Manav Vikash Thakkar (IND); Javen Choong (MAS)
Road to Buenos Aires – North America	(Canada) Markham	1–2 June 2018	2	Kim Song-gun (PRK); Cédric Meissner (GER)
Road to Buenos Aires – Oceania	(Cook Islands) Rarotonga	8–9 June 2018	2	Pang Yew En Koen (SGP); Jann Nayre (PHI)
ITTF Under-18 World Rankings	–	1 July 2018	3	Truls Möregårdh (SWE); Benjamin Gould (AUS); Maciej Kolodziejczyk (AUT)
Tripartite Invitation	-	–	2	Pagerani Rohit (BIZ); Azeez Solanke (NGR)
TOTAL			32	

=== Girls ===
Event	Location	Date	Total Places	Qualified
African Qualification Event	(Tunisia) Tunis	16–17 April 2017	2	Marwa Alhodaby (EGY); Esther Oribamise (NGR)
Latin American Qualification Event	(Dominican Republic) Santo Domingo	12–14 May 2017	2	Bruna Takahashi (BRA); Adriana Díaz (PUR)
Asian Qualification Event	(India) Greater Noida	3–5 November 2017	4	Sun Yingsha (CHN); Su Pei-ling (TPE); Miu Hirano (JPN); Jinnipa Sawettabut (THA)
European Qualification Event	(Croatia) Split	3–5 November 2017	4	Ning Jing (AZE); Nadezhda Bogdanova (BLR); Lucie Gauthier (FRA); Mariia Tailakova (RUS)
Oceania Qualification Event	(Australia) Bendigo	11–12 November 2017	1	Hui Ling Vong (NZL)
North American Qualification Event	(United States) Las Vegas	17 December 2017	1	Amy Wang (USA)
Road to Buenos Aires – Europe	(Czech Republic) Hodonín	12–13 February 2018	2	Andreea Dragoman (ROU); Lee Ka Yee (HKG)
Road to Buenos Aires – Africa	(Tunisia) Radès	24–25 March 2018	2	Tatiana Kukuľková (SVK); Sabina Šurjan (SRB)
Road to Buenos Aires – Latin America	(Paraguay) Asunción	14–15 April 2018	2	Jamila Laurenti (ITA); Goi Rui Xuan (SGP)
Road to Buenos Aires – Asia	(Thailand) Bangkok	7–8 May 2018	2	Andrea Pavlović (CRO); Choi Hae-eun (KOR)
Road to Buenos Aires – North America	(Canada) Markham	1–2 June 2018	2	Pyon Song-gyong (PRK); Franziska Schreiner (GER)
Road to Buenos Aires – Oceania	(Cook Islands) Rarotonga	8–9 June 2018	2	Archana Girish Kamath (IND); Alice Li Sian Chang (MAS)
ITTF Under-18 World Rankings	–	1 July 2018	3	Zdena Blašková (CZE); Anna Węgrzyn (POL); Annika Lundström (FIN)
Host country reallocation	–	1 July 2018	1	Aleksandra Vovk (SLO)
Tripartite Invitation	-	–	2	Chiarra Morri (SMR); Grace Yee (FIJ)
TOTAL			32	

== Medal summary ==
=== Medal table ===
Rank	Nation	Gold	Silver	Bronze	Total
1	China	3	0	0	3
2	Japan	0	3	0	3
3	Chinese Taipei	0	0	1	1
3	Romania	0	0	1	1
3	United States	0	0	1	1
Totals (5 entries)		3	3	3	9

=== Events ===
Event	Gold	Silver	Bronze
Boys' singles	Wang Chuqin; China	Tomokazu Harimoto; Japan	Kanak Jha; United States
Girls' singles	Sun Yingsha; China	Miu Hirano; Japan	Andreea Dragoman; Romania
Mixed team	China; Sun Yingsha; Wang Chuqin	Japan; Miu Hirano; Tomokazu Harimoto	Chinese Taipei; Su Pei-ling; Lin Yun-ju
