= 2021 World Table Tennis Championships =

2021 edition of the World Table Tennis Championships

- Venue: George R. Brown Convention Center
- Location: Houston, United States
- Dates: 23–29 November 2021
- Competitors: 265 from 56 nations

The 2021 World Table Tennis Championships was held in Houston, United States from 23 to 29 November. It was the 56th edition of the championships and the first time the competition was held in the United States. Houston became the host by beating Agadir, Morocco in 2019.

The International Table Tennis Federation originally planned regional and continental stage events for the qualification purpose of the Championships finals in Houston. Due to the COVID-19 pandemic, no regional and continental stage events were held before the Championships finals. The ITTF decided the qualifications were mainly based on the world rankings published on 8 June (week 23) and 25 June (week 24). Six member associations (China, Japan, Chinese Taipei, Germany, South Korea and Hong Kong) were eligible to have five entries in singles events and four players in doubles events (with a maximum of two combined pairs with another member association).

Five individual events were contested. All events were played as a single-elimination tournament. The first round of singles events had 128 places and doubles events had 64 places. Singles matches were best of seven games and doubles matches were best of five. Reigning champions Ma Long, Liu Shiwen and Xu Xin did not defend their titles at the event as China opted to send younger players in preparation for the 2024 Summer Olympics in Paris, France.

== Schedule ==
The 2021 World Championships was scheduled for seven days. Draws took place on 21 November.

Rounds in draw
Finals

Date	23 Nov	24 Nov	25 Nov	26 Nov	27 Nov	28 Nov	29 Nov
Men's singles	R1	R2	R3	R4	QF	SF	F
Women's singles	R1	R2	R3	R4	QF	SF	F
Men's doubles		R1	R2	R3	QF	SF	F
Women's doubles		R1	R2	R3	QF	SF	F
Mixed doubles	R1		R2	R3	QF	SF, F	

== Medal summary ==
=== Medal table ===
* Host nation (United States)

Rank	Nation	Gold	Silver	Bronze	Total
1	China (CHN)	4	1	5.5	10.5
2	Sweden (SWE)	1	1	0	2
3	Japan (JPN)	0	2	1	3
4	South Korea (KOR)	0	1	0	1
5	Chinese Taipei (TPE)	0	0	1	1
5	Germany (GER)	0	0	1	1
5	Luxembourg (LUX)	0	0	1	1
8	United States (USA)*	0	0	0.5	0.5
Totals (8 entries)		5	5	10	20

=== Medalists ===
Event	Gold	Silver	Bronze
Men's singles	(China) Fan Zhendong	(Sweden) Truls Möregårdh	(China) Liang Jingkun
Men's singles	(China) Fan Zhendong	(Sweden) Truls Möregårdh	(Germany) Timo Boll
Women's singles	(China) Wang Manyu	(China) Sun Yingsha	(China) Chen Meng
Women's singles	(China) Wang Manyu	(China) Sun Yingsha	(China) Wang Yidi
Men's doubles	(Sweden) Mattias Falck (Sweden) Kristian Karlsson	(South Korea) Jang Woo-jin (South Korea) Lim Jong-hoon	(China) Liang Jingkun (China) Lin Gaoyuan
Men's doubles	(Sweden) Mattias Falck (Sweden) Kristian Karlsson	(South Korea) Jang Woo-jin (South Korea) Lim Jong-hoon	(Japan) Yukiya Uda (Japan) Shunsuke Togami
Women's doubles	(China) Sun Yingsha (China) Wang Manyu	(Japan) Mima Ito (Japan) Hina Hayata	(China) Chen Meng (China) Qian Tianyi
Women's doubles	(China) Sun Yingsha (China) Wang Manyu	(Japan) Mima Ito (Japan) Hina Hayata	(Luxembourg) Ni Xialian (Luxembourg) Sarah de Nutte
Mixed doubles	(China) Wang Chuqin (China) Sun Yingsha	(Japan) Tomokazu Harimoto (Japan) Hina Hayata	(Chinese Taipei) Lin Yun-ju (Chinese Taipei) Cheng I-ching
Mixed doubles	(China) Wang Chuqin (China) Sun Yingsha	(Japan) Tomokazu Harimoto (Japan) Hina Hayata	(China) Lin Gaoyuan (United States) Lily Zhang
