= Wang Yidi =

Chinese table tennis player

Personal information
- Born: 14 February 1997 (age 29) Anshan, China
- Height: 163 cm (5 ft 4 in)

Sport
- Sport: Table tennis
- Playing style: Right-handed shakehand grip
- Highest ranking: 2 (4 July 2023)
- Current ranking: 5 (28 September 2026)
Medal record
Women's table tennis
Representing China
World Championships
Gold medal – first place	2022 Chengdu	Team
Gold medal – first place	2023 Durban	Doubles
Gold medal – first place	2024 Busan	Team
Gold medal – first place	2026 London	Team
Bronze medal – third place	2021 Houston	Singles
World Cup
Gold medal – first place	2023 Chengdu	Mixed team
Gold medal – first place	2024 Chengdu	Mixed team
Gold medal – first place	2025 Chengdu	Mixed team
WTT Cup Finals
Silver medal – second place	2021 Singapore	Singles
Bronze medal – third place	2022 Xinxiang	Singles
Silver medal – second place	2023 Nagoya	Singles
Asian Games
Gold medal – first place	2022 Hangzhou	Team
Silver medal – second place	2022 Hangzhou	Mixed doubles
Bronze medal – third place	2022 Hangzhou	Singles
Asian Championships
Gold medal – first place	2023 Pyeongchang	Mixed doubles
Gold medal – first place	2023 Pyeongchang	Team
Gold medal – first place	2025 Bhubaneswar	Team
Gold medal – first place	2026 Tashkent	Doubles
Silver medal – second place	2023 Pyeongchang	Doubles
Silver medal – second place	2024 Astana	Team
Silver medal – second place	2026 Tashkent	Team
Bronze medal – third place	2023 Pyeongchang	Singles
Bronze medal – third place	2026 Tashkent	Singles
Asian Cup
Gold medal – first place	2022 Bangkok	Singles
Universiade
Gold medal – first place	2019 Naples	Singles
Gold medal – first place	2019 Naples	Doubles
Gold medal – first place	2019 Naples	Mixed doubles
Gold medal – first place	2019 Naples	Team

Wang Yidi
- Traditional Chinese: 王藝迪
- Simplified Chinese: 王艺迪
Transcriptions
Standard Mandarin
- Hanyu Pinyin: Wáng Yìdí

Wang Yidi (Chinese: 王艺迪, born 14 February 1997) is a Chinese table tennis player.

== Career ==
In June 2019, she won the Hong Kong Open by beating Mima Ito 4–0 in the final.

In July 2019, she won four gold medals at the 2019 Summer Universiade.

== Singles titles ==
Year	Tournament	Final opponent	Score	Ref
2019	ITTF World Tour, Hong Kong Open	(Japan) Mima Ito	4–0	
2021	WTT Contender Laško	(China) Liu Weishan	4–1	
2022	WTT Star Contender European Summer Series	(China) Sun Yingsha	4–1	
2022	Asian Cup	(Japan) Mima Ito	4–2	
2023	WTT Star Contender Goa	(Chinese Taipei) Cheng I-ching	4–0	
2023	WTT Champions Frankfurt	(China) Wang Manyu	4–0	
2025	WTT Champions Incheon	(China) Chen Xingtong	4–3	
2025	WTT Champions Montpellier	(Germany) Sabine Winter	4–3	
