= Sarah De Nutte =

Luxembourgish table tennis player

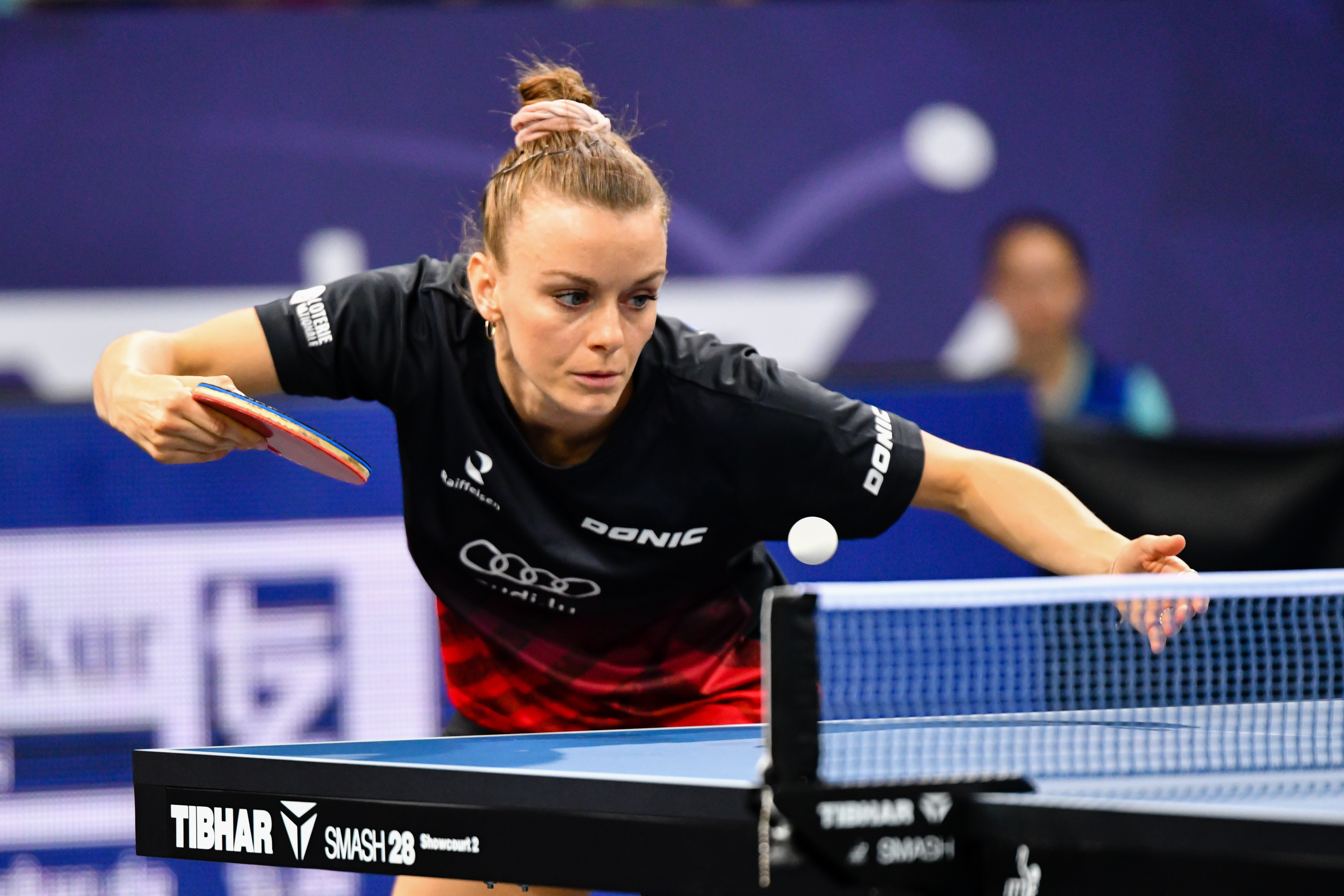
- De Nutte in 2022

Personal information
- Full name: Sarah Marianne Charlotte Ghislaine De Nutte
- Nickname: Sunny
- Nationality: Luxembourgish
- Born: 21 November 1992 (age 33) Dudelange, Luxembourg
- Height: 1.66 m (5 ft 5 in)
- Weight: 50 kg (110 lb)

Sport
- Sport: Table tennis
- Club: Saint-Quentin (France) Dudelange (Luxembourg)
- Playing style: Right-handed, shakehand grip
- Equipment: DHS blade; DHS Hurricane 3 Blue Sponge (Black, FH)
- Highest ranking: 57 (March 2018)
- Current ranking: 84 (28 September 2026)
Medal record
Women's table tennis
Representing Luxembourg
Games of the Small States of Europe
Gold medal – first place	2025 Andorra la Vella	Singles
Gold medal – first place	2025 Andorra la Vella	Team
Bronze medal – third place	2025 Andorra la Vella	Doubles
World Championships
Bronze medal – third place	2021 Houston	Doubles
European Championships
Bronze medal – third place	2018 Alicante	Doubles
Bronze medal – third place	2022 Munich	Doubles

Sarah De Nutte (born 21 November 1992) is a professional Luxembourgish table tennis player and the most successful Luxembourgish table tennis player so far. She competed in the 2020 Summer Olympics and won the women's doubles bronze medal at the 2021 World Table Tennis Championships alongside Ni Xia Lian. Since 1995, she is the first and only native European woman to win a medal at the world table tennis championships in women's doubles. She is the current World No. 3 in women's doubles alongside Ni Xia Lian. In June 2022, she was awarded the Knight Order of the Oak Crown by the Grand Duchy of Luxembourg for her performances for her country. She currently plays for the top-flight club TT Saint-Quentin in the French first division (Championnat de France - Pro A). She is right-handed and plays with the shakehand grip style.
