= Lee Eun-hye =

South Korean table tennis player (born 1995)

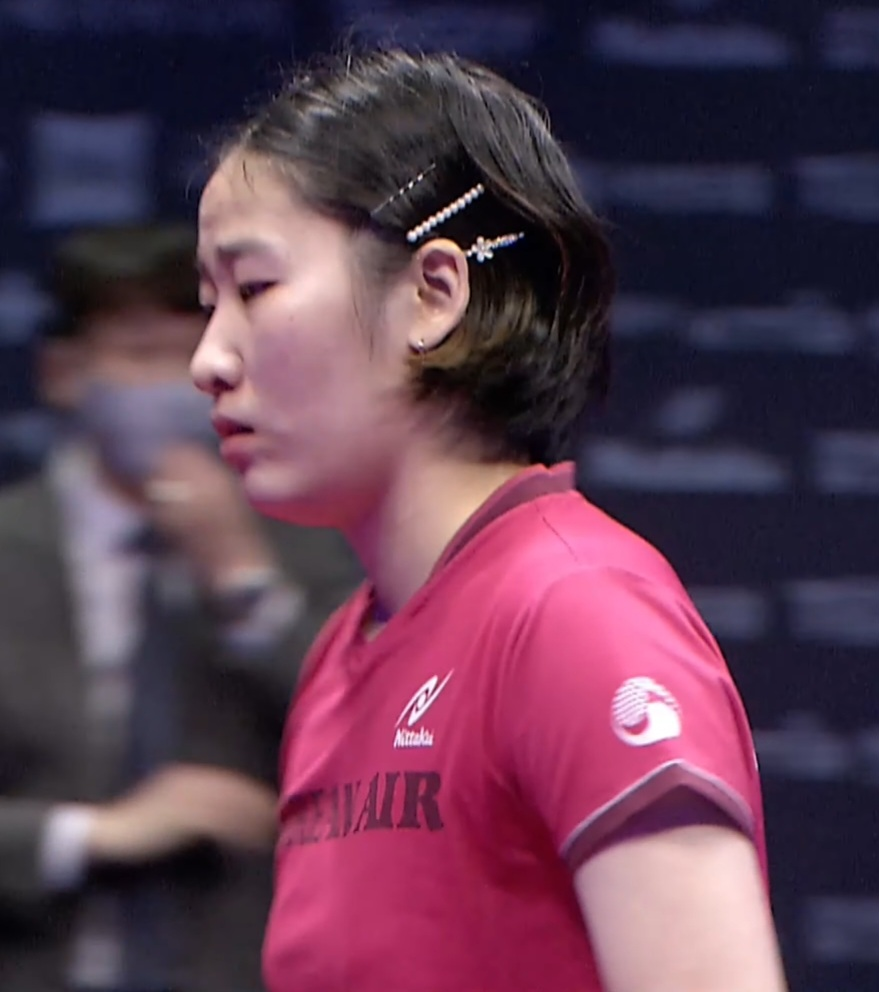
- Lee in 2022

Personal information
- Nationality: South Korean (since 2011)
- Born: 2 May 1995 (age 31) Hebei, China
- Height: 170 cm (5 ft 7 in)

Sport
- Sport: Table tennis
- Club: Korean Air
- Highest ranking: 37 (1 April 2024)
- Current ranking: 54 (28 September 2026)
Medal record
Women's table tennis
Representing South Korea
Olympic Games
Bronze medal – third place	2024 Paris	Team
Asian Games
Bronze medal – third place	2022 Hangzhou	Team
Asian Championships
Bronze medal – third place	2025 Bhubaneswar	Team
Bronze medal – third place	2026 Tashkent	Team

Lee Eun-hye (Korean: 이은혜; born 2 May 1995) is a South Korean table tennis player. She was part of the South Korean women's team at the 2024 Summer Olympics that won a bronze medal.
