= Qian Tianyi =

Chinese table tennis player

Personal information
- Born: 23 January 2000 (age 26) Jingjiang, Jiangsu, China

Sport
- Sport: Table tennis
- Playing style: Left-handed shakehand grip
- Highest ranking: 5 (4 April 2023)
- Current ranking: 217 (28 September 2026)
Medal record
Women's table tennis
Representing China
World Championships
Bronze medal – third place	2021 Houston	Doubles
Asian Championships
Silver medal – second place	2023 Pyeongchang	Mixed doubles
World University Games
Gold medal – first place	2021 Chengdu	Singles
Gold medal – first place	2021 Chengdu	Doubles
Gold medal – first place	2021 Chengdu	Mixed doubles
Gold medal – first place	2021 Chengdu	Team

Qian Tianyi
- Traditional Chinese: 錢天一
- Simplified Chinese: 钱天一
Transcriptions
Standard Mandarin
- Hanyu Pinyin: Qián Tiānyī

Qian Tianyi (Chinese: 钱天一, born 23 January 2000) is a Chinese table tennis player. She was the 2018 World Junior Table Tennis singles champion.

== Personal life ==
On 7 February 2026, Qian announced on Weibo that she had registered her marriage with national badminton player Wang Chang, posting a video of his proposal, while Wang shared photos of their marriage certificates.

== Singles titles ==
Year	Tournament	Final opponent	Score	Ref
2022	WTT Feeder Doha	(China) Liu Weishan	4–1	
2022	WTT Feeder Olomouc	(South Korea) Lee Eun-hye	4–1	
2023	WTT Contender Durban	(China) Fan Siqi	4–1	
