= Chen Xingtong =

Chinese table tennis player

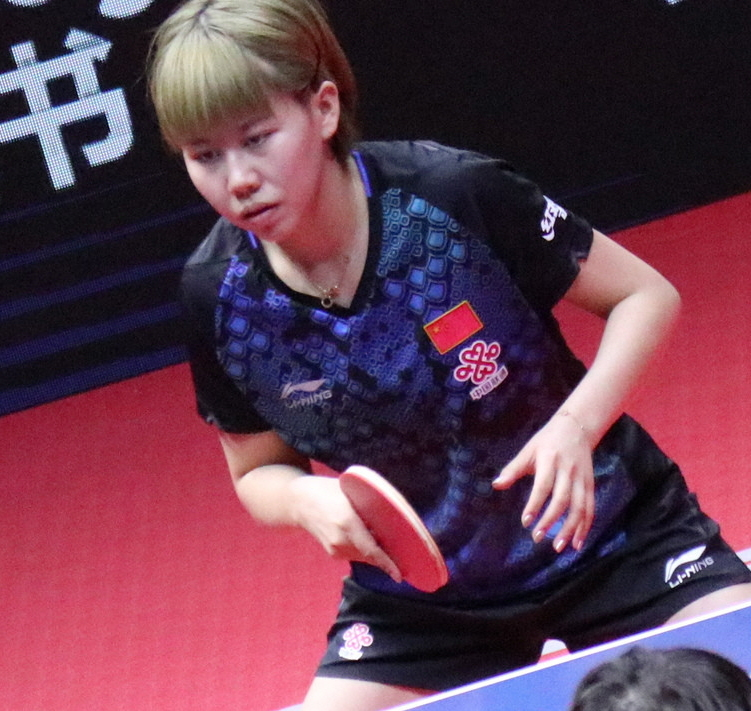

Personal information
- Born: 27 May 1997 (age 29) Shenyang, China
- Height: 1.65 m (5 ft 5 in)

Sport
- Sport: Table tennis
- Playing style: Right-handed, shakehand grip
- Highest ranking: 3 (25 July 2023)
- Current ranking: 7 (28 September 2026)
Medal record
Women's table tennis
Representing China
World Championships
Gold medal – first place	2022 Chengdu	Team
Gold medal – first place	2024 Busan	Team
Gold medal – first place	2026 London	Team
Bronze medal – third place	2023 Durban	Singles
Bronze medal – third place	2025 Doha	Singles
World Cup
Gold medal – first place	2018 London	Team
Bronze medal – third place	2025 Macao	Singles
Asian Games
Gold medal – first place	2018 Jakarta	Team
Gold medal – first place	2022 Hangzhou	Team
Asian Championships
Gold medal – first place	2017 Wuxi	Mixed doubles
Gold medal – first place	2023 Pyeongchang	Team
Gold medal – first place	2025 Bhubaneswar	Team
Silver medal – second place	2024 Astana	Team
Bronze medal – third place	2023 Pyeongchang	Singles
Bronze medal – third place	2024 Astana	Doubles

Chen Xingtong (Chinese: 陈幸同; born 27 May 1997) is a Chinese table tennis player.

== Singles titles ==
Year	Tournament	Final opponent	Score	Ref
2017	ITTF World Tour, Hungarian Open	(China) Wen Jia	4–1	
2017	ITTF World Tour, Swedish Open	(China) Ding Ning	4–3	
2019	ITTF World Tour, Bulgaria Open	(China) He Zhuojia	4–1	
2019	ITTF World Tour, Czech Open	(Japan) Miu Hirano	4–3	
2022	WTT Feeder Panagyurishte	(Romania) Adina Diaconu	4–0	
2022	WTT Contender Muscat	(South Korea) Choi Hyo-joo	4–0	
2023	WTT Star Contender Bangkok	(South Korea) Joo Cheon-hui	4–1	
2025	WTT Champions Yokohama	(China) Sun Yingsha	4–2	
