= Chen Szu-yu (table tennis) =

Taiwanese table tennis player

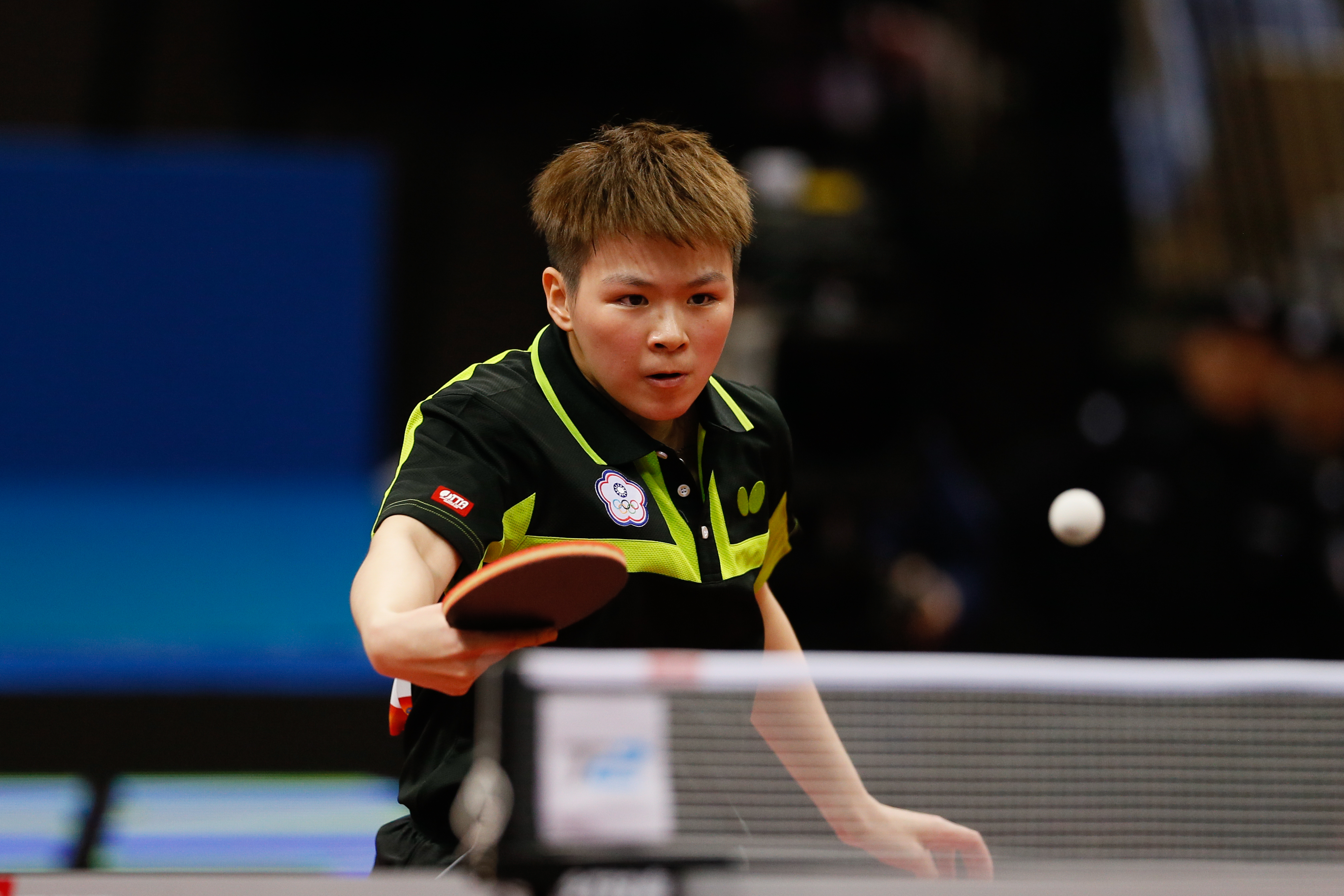

Personal information
- Born: 1 August 1993 (age 33) Taipei County, Taiwan
- Height: 163 cm (5 ft 4 in)

Sport
- Sport: Table tennis
- Playing style: Right-handed, shakehand grip
- Highest ranking: 10 (March 2018)
- Current ranking: 134 (28 September 2026)
Medal record
Women's table tennis
Representing Chinese Taipei
World Championships
Bronze medal – third place	2016 Kuala Lumpur	Team
Bronze medal – third place	2022 Chengdu	Team
World Cup
Bronze medal – third place	2019 Tokyo	Team
Asian Championships
Bronze medal – third place	2019 Yogyakarta	Team
Bronze medal – third place	2023 Pyeongchang	Mixed doubles
Bronze medal – third place	2026 Tashkent	Team

Chen Szu-yu (Chinese: 陳思羽; pinyin: Chén Sīyǔ; born 1 August 1993) is a Taiwanese table tennis player. She competed for Chinese Taipei at the 2012, 2016, 2020, and 2024 Summer Olympics. Chen is a two-time medalist at the World Team Championships as a member of the Chinese Taipei women's team.

Chen announced her retirement via her Instagram account, ending her more than tewnty years of professional career.
