= 2025 World Table Tennis Championships – Women's singles =

Women's singles at the 2025 World Table Tennis Championships
- Venue: Lusail Sports Arena; Qatar University Sports Complex
- Location: Doha, Qatar
- Dates: 17–25 May

Medalists
gold medal	Sun Yingsha	China
silver medal	Wang Manyu	China
bronze medal	Mima Ito	Japan
bronze medal	Chen Xingtong	China

The women's singles competition of the 2025 World Table Tennis Championships was held from 17 to 25 May 2025. The event was played as a straight knockout. All singles matches were best of 7 games.

China's Sun Yingsha defended her women's singles title, overcoming compatriot Wang Manyu in a seven-game final.

== Seeds ==
Singles events had 32 seeded players. Seeding was based on the ITTF world ranking published on 29 April 2025.

1. (China) Sun Yingsha (champion)
2. (China) Wang Manyu (final)
3. (China) Chen Xingtong (semifinals)
4. (China) Wang Yidi (quarterfinals)
5. (Japan) Miwa Harimoto (quarterfinals)
6. (Japan) Hina Hayata (quarterfinals)
7. (Japan) Satsuki Odo (quarterfinals)
8. (Japan) Mima Ito (semifinals)
9. (South Korea) Shin Yu-bin (fourth round)
10. (Chinese Taipei) Cheng I-ching (fourth round)
11. (Romania) Bernadette Szőcs (fourth round)
12. (Austria) Sofia Polcanova (second round)
13. (Brazil) Bruna Takahashi (fourth round)
14. (Puerto Rico) Adriana Díaz (third round)
15. (Japan) Miu Hirano (second round)
16. (China) Shi Xunyao (fourth round)
17. (South Korea) Suh Hyo-won (third round)
18. (United States) Lily Zhang (second round)
19. (Egypt) Hana Goda (third round)
20. (France) Prithika Pavade (fourth round)
21. (Chinese Taipei) Huang Yi-hua (first round)
22. (India) Manika Batra (second round)
23. (South Korea) Kim Na-yeong (first round)
24. (Romania) Elizabeta Samara (second round)
25. (India) Sreeja Akula (first round)
26. (France) Jia Nan Yuan (second round)
27. (Egypt) Dina Meshref (first round)
28. (Hong Kong) Doo Hoi Kem (second round)
29. (Germany) Han Ying (Note: Han Ying's rank was protected due to an injury in 2024.) (third round)
30. (Canada) Mo Zhang (third round)
31. (Germany) Sabine Winter (third round)
32. (Germany) Shan Xiaona (first round)

== Draw ==
The draw took place on 30 April 2025. There are 128 players in women's single, players of the same association were separated only in the first round.

=== Key ===
- r = Retired
- w/o = Walkover

=== Finals ===
Quarterfinals
1	(China) Sun Yingsha	9	11	11	13	11
7	(Japan) Satsuki Odo	11	8	4	11	5
8	(Japan) Mima Ito	6	11	11	11	11
4	(China) Wang Yidi	11	8	6	8	9
3	(China) Chen Xingtong	12	11	11	11
6	(Japan) Hina Hayata	10	6	7	9
5	(Japan) Miwa Harimoto	5	8	9	5
2	(China) Wang Manyu	11	11	11	11

Semifinals
1	(China) Sun Yingsha	11	11	11	11
8	(Japan) Mima Ito	7	5	9	4
3	(China) Chen Xingtong	8	8	2	8
2	(China) Wang Manyu	11	11	11	11

Final
1	(China) Sun Yingsha	11	12	8	5	12	11	11
2	(China) Wang Manyu	6	10	11	11	10	13	7

=== Top half ===
==== Section 1 ====
First round
1	(China) Sun	11	11	11	11
(Ukraine) Matiunina	5	6	4	7
(Costa Rica) Zavaleta	2	2	4	2
(North Korea) Pyon	11	11	11	11
(France) Ch. Lutz	7	8	11	11	12	11
(South Korea) Lee E.	11	11	9	8	10	8
(India) Ghorpade	7	11	9	9	8
26	(France) Yuan	11	8	11	11	11
28	(Hong Kong) Doo	11	11	11	11
(France) Hochart	7	9	9	4
(Italy) Monfardini	2	11	11	9	14	11
(Slovakia) Balážová	11	8	9	11	12	9
(Romania) Singeorzan	11	11	11	12
(France) Zarif	9	7	9	10
(New Zealand) Gear	5	7	3	3
9	(South Korea) Shin	11	11	11	11

Second round
1	(China) Sun	11	11	11	11
(North Korea) Pyon	2	5	9	4
(France) Ch. Lutz	11	11	9	11	11
26	(France) Yuan	9	7	11	6	7
28	(Hong Kong) Doo	9	8	11	11	11	6	7
(Italy) Monfardini	11	11	9	4	7	11	11
(Romania) Singeorzan	11	6	5	12	5	1
9	(South Korea) Shin	9	11	11	10	11	11

Third round
1	(China) Sun	11	11	11	11
(France) Ch. Lutz	4	6	6	1
(Italy) Monfardini	5	11	9	12	14
9	(South Korea) Shin	11	8	11	14	16

Fourth round
1	(China) Sun	11	7	11	11	10	12
9	(South Korea) Shin	8	11	6	5	12	10

==== Section 2 ====
First round
15	(Japan) Hirano	8	11	11	11	11
(Luxembourg) De Nutte	11	6	5	7	5
(Croatia) Rakovac	11	11	11	11
(New Caledonia) Giret	1	1	2	9
(Italy) Piccolin	11	11	11	11
(Belgium) Massart	5	7	6	5
(Australia) Psihogios	11	11	9	5	10	4
17	(South Korea) Suh	9	5	11	11	12	11
31	(Germany) Winter	11	11	14	11
(Egypt) Alhodaby	4	5	12	6
(Singapore) Loy	10	9	11	9	11	19
(Madagascar) Raharimanana	12	11	2	11	4	21
(Portugal) Shao	8	11	11	9	11	11
(Malaysia) Chang LS	11	9	7	11	4	8
(Chile) Vega	5	10	8	5
7	(Japan) Odo	11	12	11	11

Second round
15	(Japan) Hirano	8	11	10	11	6	7
(Croatia) Rakovac	11	7	12	5	11	11
(Italy) Piccolin	6	12	8	4	8
17	(South Korea) Suh	11	10	11	11	11
31	(Germany) Winter	11	11	11	11
(Madagascar) Raharimanana	2	8	2	4
(Portugal) Shao	6	7	7	11	5
7	(Japan) Odo	11	11	11	9	11

Third round
(Croatia) Rakovac	3	11	7	11	11	11
17	(South Korea) Suh	11	9	11	4	7	6
31	(Germany) Winter	4	7	6	8
7	(Japan) Odo	11	11	11	11

Fourth round
(Croatia) Rakovac	3	9	7	5
7	(Japan) Odo	11	11	11	11

==== Section 3 ====
First round
8	(Japan) Ito	11	11	11	11
(Puerto Rico) Burgos	4	5	5	2
(Qatar) A. Mohamed	3	7	8	11	8
(Cuba) Aguiar	11	11	11	7	11
(Poland) Bajor	11	11	6	11	9	11
(Singapore) Ser	8	4	11	8	11	9
(Thailand) S. Sawettabut	9	11	11	11	11
25	(India) Akula	11	8	6	5	2
30	(Canada) M. Zhang	10	11	9	11	11	11
(Serbia) Surjan	12	8	11	9	7	9
(Mexico) Cossio	11	7	11	2
(United States) J. Lai	13	11	13	11
(India) Chitale	11	11	11	14
(Spain) S. Zhang	4	7	3	12
(North Korea) Pak	9	5	5	8
10	(Chinese Taipei) Cheng	11	11	11	11

Second round
8	(Japan) Ito	11	11	11	11
(Cuba) Aguiar	8	2	3	9
(Poland) Bajor	11	11	13	8	12
(Thailand) S. Sawettabut	9	8	11	11	10
30	(Canada) M. Zhang	11	11	11	11
(United States) J. Lai	5	6	4	3
(India) Chitale	3	7	6	11	5
10	(Chinese Taipei) Cheng	11	11	11	6	11

Third round
8	(Japan) Ito	11	11	11	9	2	11
(Poland) Bajor	7	9	9	11	11	9
30	(Canada) M. Zhang	17	5	6	6	6
10	(Chinese Taipei) Cheng	15	11	11	11	11

Fourth round
8	(Japan) Ito	11	21	11	11
10	(Chinese Taipei) Cheng	8	19	6	9

==== Section 4 ====
First round
12	(Austria) Polcanova	8	7	12	11	16	13
(Thailand) Paranang	11	11	10	8	14	11
(Thailand) J. Sawettabut	5	11	6	3	7
(Romania) Dragoman	11	8	11	11	11
(Argentina) Codina	9	10	7	18	11	9
(Slovakia) Kukuľková	11	12	11	16	7	11
(Spain) Xiao	9	11	6	4	8
20	(France) Pavade	11	8	11	11	11
19	(Egypt) Goda	10	11	11	11	11
(Australia) Wu	12	5	6	5	8
(Nigeria) Udoaka	3	1	6	8
(Brazil) G. Takahashi	11	11	11	11
(United States) A. Wang	20	3	9	9	11	13	11
(Wales) Hursey	18	11	11	11	6	11	8
(Hong Kong) Zhu	2	9	15	8	9
4	(China) Wang Y.	11	11	13	11	11

Second round
12	(Austria) Polcanova	11	7	9	11	11	8
(Romania) Dragoman	5	11	11	13	8	11
(Slovakia) Kukuľková	5	3	6	8
20	(France) Pavade	11	11	11	11
19	(Egypt) Goda	9	11	11	11	11
(Brazil) G. Takahashi	11	4	5	7	7
(United States) A. Wang	4	7	8	7
4	(China) Wang Y.	11	11	11	11

Third round
(Romania) Dragoman	11	9	12	6
20	(France) Pavade	13	11	14	11
19	(Egypt) Goda	7	10	4	7
4	(China) Wang Y.	11	12	11	11

Fourth round
20	(France) Pavade	7	7	7	8
4	(China) Wang Y.	11	11	11	11

=== Bottom half ===
==== Section 5 ====
First round
3	(China) Chen X.	11	11	11	11
(South Africa) Sonday	7	4	3	1
(Hong Kong) Ng	7	5	10	7
(Germany) Kaufmann	11	11	12	11
(Serbia) Lupulesku	11	9	11	14	11	11
(Switzerland) Moret	5	11	8	16	5	2
(Italy) Vivarelli	4	3	8	2
24	(Romania) Samara	11	11	11	11
32	(Germany) Shan	5	11	11	11	9	7	4
(Turkey) Altinkaya	11	7	7	9	11	11	11
(New Zealand) J. Lam	6	7	8	11	6
(Egypt) Y. Helmy	11	11	11	9	11
(United States) Moyland	11	11	16	11	11
(Nigeria) Ojomu	2	7	18	4	5
(Uganda) Nangonzi	3	5	2	1
13	(Brazil) B. Takahashi	11	11	11	11

Second round
3	(China) Chen X.	9	11	12	11	9	11
(Germany) Kaufmann	11	7	10	5	11	9
(Serbia) Lupulesku	11	0
24	(Romania) Samara	5	0^{r}
(Turkey) Altinkaya	11	11	5	8	11	6	14
(Egypt) Y. Helmy	2	9	11	11	8	11	12
(United States) Moyland	3	11	12	11	11	5
13	(Brazil) B. Takahashi	11	9	14	9	13	11

Third round
3	(China) Chen X.	11	11	11	9	14
(Serbia) Lupulesku	1	5	9	11	12
(Turkey) Altinkaya	6	7	3	11	9
13	(Brazil) B. Takahashi	11	11	11	6	11

Fourth round
3	(China) Chen X.	10	11	11	11	11
13	(Brazil) B. Takahashi	12	7	8	7	8

==== Section 6 ====
First round
16	(China) Shi	11	11	11	11
(Hong Kong) Lam YL	5	3	8	5
(Serbia) Todorović	11	10	11	11	12
(South Africa) Patel	5	12	5	3	10
(Singapore) Tan	8	7	14	13	7	6
(South Korea) Park G.	11	11	12	11	11	11
(Nigeria) Bello	5	6	8	1
22	(India) Batra	11	11	11	11
27	(Egypt) Meshref	7	3	3	7
(Czech Republic) Matelová	11	11	11	11
(Ukraine) Brateyko	4	9	6	11	9
(Sweden) Bergström	11	11	11	9	11
(Kazakhstan) Mirkadirova	10	6	5	8
(Iran) Shahsavari	12	11	11	11
(Romania) Diaconu	6	5	9	12
6	(Japan) Hayata	11	11	11	14

Second round
16	(China) Shi	11	11	11	11
(Serbia) Todorović	2	1	8	2
(South Korea) Park G.	11	11	11	11
22	(India) Batra	8	7	5	8
(Czech Republic) Matelová	11	11	9	11	12
(Sweden) Bergström	6	5	11	7	10
(Iran) Shahsavari	5	9	1	2
6	(Japan) Hayata	11	11	11	11

Third round
16	(China) Shi	11	11	11	11
(South Korea) Park G.	8	5	5	7
(Czech Republic) Matelová	7	11	7	11	6	10
6	(Japan) Hayata	11	7	11	9	11	12

Fourth round
16	(China) Shi	5	11	11	5	5	9
6	(Japan) Hayata	11	8	8	11	11	11

==== Section 7 ====
First round
5	(Japan) M. Harimoto	11	17	9	11	11
(Ukraine) Pesotska	8	15	11	9	7
(Germany) Y. Wan	11	5	15	11	11
(Portugal) Fu	6	11	13	9	3
(North Korea) Kim KY	9	11	11	9	11	11
(Hungary) Póta	11	7	5	11	9	8
(Sweden) C. Källberg	11	11	11	9	11
21	(Chinese Taipei) Huang Y-h	4	9	9	11	9
23	(South Korea) Kim N.	7	11	10	11	11	7	7
(Chinese Taipei) Huang Y-c	11	4	12	9	9	11	11
(Chile) Ortega	11	11	5	6	9	4
(Singapore) Zeng	6	9	11	11	11	11
(Chinese Taipei) Tsai	11	11	11	4	11	11
(Philippines) K. Cruz	13	9	8	11	9	9
(Sweden) Bergand	5	9	7	12	7
14	(Puerto Rico) A. Díaz	11	11	11	10	11

Second round
5	(Japan) M. Harimoto	11	11	11	11
(Germany) Y. Wan	3	8	6	9
(North Korea) Kim KY	11	11	11	9	11
(Sweden) C. Källberg	8	6	4	11	3
(Chinese Taipei) Huang Y-c	11	8	11	11	5	13	3
(Singapore) Zeng	9	11	4	5	11	15	11
(Chinese Taipei) Tsai	11	6	3	8	11	4
14	(Puerto Rico) A. Díaz	7	11	11	11	6	11

Third round
5	(Japan) M. Harimoto	11	5	11	11	8	8	11
(North Korea) Kim KY	8	11	6	7	11	11	3
(Singapore) Zeng	11	11	7	10	13	6	11
14	(Puerto Rico) A. Díaz	7	8	11	12	11	11	5

Fourth round
5	(Japan) M. Harimoto	11	11	11	11
(Singapore) Zeng	5	9	4	6

==== Section 8 ====
First round
11	(Romania) Szőcs	8	11	11	11	4	11
(Poland) Wegrzyn	11	4	5	7	11	4
(Qatar) M. Ali	2	7	1	1
(Chile) Zeng Z.y.	11	11	11	11
(Cuba) Fonseca	7	8	1	5
(Chinese Taipei) Li Y-j	11	11	11	11
(Croatia) Jeger	11	10	4	11	12	7
18	(United States) L. Zhang	6	12	11	8	14	11
29	(Germany) Y. Han	11	11	11	13
(Croatia) Malobabić	9	6	2	11
(Croatia) Arapović	8	11	6	4	11	19	11
(Kazakhstan) Akasheva	11	7	11	11	8	17	8
(Brazil) Watanabe	11	11	11	11	11
(Algeria) Nasri	5	5	13	9	6
(Poland) Wielgos	3	6	4	13	4
2	(China) Wang M.	11	11	11	11	11

Second round
11	(Romania) Szőcs	11	11	11	11
(Chile) Zeng Z.y.	5	4	8	3
(Chinese Taipei) Li Y-j	9	11	11	11	11
18	(United States) L. Zhang	11	9	7	8	7
29	(Germany) Y. Han	12	12	11	11
(Croatia) Arapović	10	10	8	8
(Brazil) Watanabe	8	1	5	2
2	(China) Wang M.	11	11	11	11

Third round
11	(Romania) Szőcs	11	11	11	8	11
(Chinese Taipei) Li Y-j	9	7	8	11	7
29	(Germany) Y. Han	10	10	11	4	11
2	(China) Wang M.	12	12	9	11	13

Fourth round
11	(Romania) Szőcs	6	10	5	6
2	(China) Wang M.	11	12	11	11
