= 2023 World Table Tennis Championships – Women's doubles =

Women's doubles at the 2023 World Table Tennis Championships
- Venue: Durban International Convention Centre
- Location: Durban, KwaZulu-Natal, South Africa
- Dates: 20–27 May

Medalists
gold medal	Chen Meng; Wang Yidi	China
silver medal	Shin Yu-bin; Jeon Ji-hee	South Korea
bronze medal	Wang Manyu; Sun Yingsha	China
bronze medal	Miyu Nagasaki; Miyuu Kihara	Japan

The women's doubles competition of the 2023 World Table Tennis Championships was held from 20 to 27 May 2023. The event was played as a straight knockout. All doubles matches were best of 5 games.

== Seeds ==
Doubles events had 16 seeded pairs. Seeding was based on the ITTF world ranking published on 16 May 2023.

1. (China) Wang Manyu / (China) Sun Yingsha (semifinals)
2. (Japan) Mima Ito / (Japan) Hina Hayata (quarterfinals)
3. (Luxembourg) Sarah de Nutte / (Luxembourg) Ni Xialian (second round)
4. (Austria) Sofia Polcanova / (Romania) Bernadette Szőcs (quarterfinals)
5. (Chinese Taipei) Li Yu-jhun / (Chinese Taipei) Cheng I-ching (quarterfinals)
6. (China) Chen Meng / (China) Wang Yidi (champions)
7. (Japan) Miyuu Kihara / (Japan) Miyu Nagasaki (semifinals)
8. (South Korea) Shin Yu-bin / (South Korea) Jeon Ji-hee (final)
9. (Hong Kong) Doo Hoi Kem / (Hong Kong) Zhu Cheng Zhu (third round)
10. (South Korea) Choi Hyo-joo / (South Korea) Lee Zi-on (first round)
11. (India) Archana Girish Kamath / (India) Manika Batra (third round)
12. (Sweden) Linda Bergström / (Sweden) Christina Källberg (third round)
13. (Chinese Taipei) Chen Szu-yu / (Chinese Taipei) Huang Yi-hua (third round)
14. (Romania) Andreea Dragoman / (Romania) Elizabeta Samara (third round)
15. (Slovakia) Barbora Balážová / (Czech Republic) Hana Matelová (quarterfinals)
16. (France) Camille Lutz / (France) Prithika Pavade (second round)

== Draw ==
The draw took place on 18 May. Players of the same association were separated only in the first round of the draw.

=== Key ===
- r = Retired
- w/o = Walkover

=== Finals ===
Semifinals
1	(China) Sun Yingsha (China) Wang Manyu	7	9	6
8	(South Korea) Shin Yu-bin (South Korea) Jeon Ji-hee	11	11	11
7	(Japan) Miyu Nagasaki (Japan) Miyuu Kihara	11	6	5	11
6	(China) Chen Meng (China) Wang Yidi	8	11	11	13

Final
8	(South Korea) Shin Yu-bin (South Korea) Jeon Ji-hee	8	7	10
6	(China) Chen Meng (China) Wang Yidi	11	11	12

=== Top half ===
==== Section 1 ====
First round
(India) Akula (India) Chitale	8	11	6	11	11
(Italy) Arlia (Italy) Monfardini	11	9	11	8	9
(Canada) Zhang (Canada) Liao	11	11	12	10	5
(Singapore) Zhou (Singapore) Zeng	8	13	10	12	11
(Egypt) Yehia (Egypt) Goda	11	10	8
9	(Hong Kong) Zhu (Hong Kong) Doo	13	12	11
16	(France) Ca. Lutz (France) Pavade	11	11	11
(Slovakia) Labošová (Slovakia) Kukuľková	9	6	6
(Kazakhstan) Akasheva (Kazakhstan) Lavrova	5	4	11	6
(Germany) Winter (Germany) Kaufmann	11	11	8	11
(Uzbekistan) Norkulova (Uzbekistan) Khalikova
(Turkey) Altınkaya (Turkey) Kulakçeken	^{w/o}

Second round
1	(China) Sun (China) Wang M.	11	11	13
(India) Akula (India) Chitale	8	8	11
(Singapore) Zhou (Singapore) Zeng	4	11	7	7
9	(Hong Kong) Zhu (Hong Kong) Doo	11	8	11	11
16	(France) Ca. Lutz (France) Pavade	6	11	11	9	3
(Germany) Winter (Germany) Kaufmann	11	3	9	11	11
(Turkey) Altınkaya (Turkey) Kulakçeken	2	6	9
5	(Chinese Taipei) Cheng (Chinese Taipei) Li	11	11	11

Third round
1	(China) Sun (China) Wang M.	11	11	11
9	(Hong Kong) Zhu (Hong Kong) Doo	8	7	7
(Germany) Winter (Germany) Kaufmann	7	7	7
5	(Chinese Taipei) Cheng (Chinese Taipei) Li	11	11	11

Quarterfinals
1	(China) Sun (China) Wang M.	11	17	11
5	(Chinese Taipei) Cheng (Chinese Taipei) Li	4	15	8

==== Section 2 ====
First round
(Poland) K. Węgrzyn (Poland) A. Węgrzyn	11	11	6	7	7
(Croatia) Jeger (Croatia) Malobabić	9	8	11	11	11
(Zambia) Mwelwa (Zambia) Nalavwe	1	4	7
(Austria) Mischek (England) Ho	11	11	11
(Vanuatu) Qwea (Vanuatu) Santhy
12	(Sweden) Bergström (Sweden) Källberg	^{w/o}
10	(South Korea) Lee (South Korea) Choi	11	6	11	5
(Germany) Shan (Germany) Mittelham	9	11	13	11
(Uzbekistan) Kamalova (Uzbekistan) Magdieva	4	6	2
(Mexico) Cossio Aceves (Mexico) Silva	11	11	11
(Chile) Vega (Chile) Ortega	11	8	4
(United States) Wang (United States) Sung	13	11	11

Second round
8	(South Korea) Shin (South Korea) Jeon	11	11	11
(Croatia) Jeger (Croatia) Malobabić	6	6	8
(Austria) Mischek (England) Ho	10	4	11	7
12	(Sweden) Bergström (Sweden) Källberg	12	11	8	11
(Germany) Shan (Germany) Mittelham	11	8	11	11
(Mexico) Cossio Aceves (Mexico) Silva	7	11	7	7
(United States) Wang (United States) Sung	6	2	11	3
4	(Romania) Szőcs (Austria) Polcanova	11	11	7	11

Third round
8	(South Korea) Shin (South Korea) Jeon	13	11	11
12	(Sweden) Bergström (Sweden) Källberg	11	9	3
(Germany) Shan (Germany) Mittelham	8	11	6
4	(Romania) Szőcs (Austria) Polcanova	11	13	11

Quarterfinals
8	(South Korea) Shin (South Korea) Jeon	11	15	11
4	(Romania) Szőcs (Austria) Polcanova	9	13	4

=== Bottom half ===
==== Section 3 ====
First round
(Hong Kong) Lee (Hong Kong) Ng	11	11	11
(Nigeria) Bello (Nigeria) Oshonaike	3	1	2
(Turkey) Yılmaz (Turkey) Haraç	5	8	13	4
(Egypt) Alhodaby (Egypt) Helmy	11	11	11	11
(Puerto Rico) A. Díaz (Puerto Rico) M. Díaz	14	8	6	8
15	(Czech Republic) Matelová (Slovakia) Balážová	12	11	11	11
13	(Chinese Taipei) Huang (Chinese Taipei) Chen	11	11	11	7	11
(Italy) Piccolin (Italy) Vivarelli	7	13	6	11	8
(Thailand) Sawettabut (Thailand) Paranang	7	11	11	8	9
(Slovenia) Stražar (Slovenia) Tofant	11	5	7	11	11
(Portugal) Shao (Portugal) Fu	8	14	7	9
(Singapore) Goi (Singapore) Wong	11	12	11	11

Second round
3	(Luxembourg) Ni (Luxembourg) De Nutte	10	11	6	8
(Hong Kong) Lee (Hong Kong) Ng	12	6	11	11
(Egypt) Alhodaby (Egypt) Helmy	7	7	10
15	(Czech Republic) Matelová (Slovakia) Balážová	11	11	12
13	(Chinese Taipei) Huang (Chinese Taipei) Chen	11	11	11
(Slovenia) Stražar (Slovenia) Tofant	7	6	5
(Singapore) Goi (Singapore) Wong	3	4	4
7	(Japan) Nagasaki (Japan) Kihara	11	11	11

Third round
(Hong Kong) Lee (Hong Kong) Ng	11	9	9	4
15	(Czech Republic) Matelová (Slovakia) Balážová	5	11	11	11
13	(Chinese Taipei) Huang (Chinese Taipei) Chen	7	11	8	9
7	(Japan) Nagasaki (Japan) Kihara	11	9	11	11

Quarterfinals
15	(Czech Republic) Matelová (Slovakia) Balážová	8	11	11	2	3
7	(Japan) Nagasaki (Japan) Kihara	11	9	6	11	11

==== Section 4 ====
First round
(France) Ch. Lutz (France) Zarif	10	2	9
(Spain) Xiao (Romania) Diaconu	12	11	11
(Brazil) Kumahara (Brazil) Takahashi	11	11	11	9	11
(Czech Republic) Blašková (Czech Republic) Tomanovská	13	8	7	11	4
(South Africa) Kalam (South Africa) Edwards	2	4	3
14	(Romania) Dragoman (Romania) Samara	11	11	11
11	(India) Batra (India) Kamath	10	11	11	11
(United States) Quan (United States) Lin	12	2	9	5
(Nigeria) Edem (Nigeria) Akpan	5	3	10
(Hungary) Póta (Hungary) Madarász	11	11	12
(Papua New Guinea) Agari (Vanuatu) Mawa
(South Africa) Patel (South Africa) Maphanga	^{w/o}

Second round
6	(China) Chen (China) Wang Y.	11	11	11
(Spain) Xiao (Romania) Diaconu	9	9	1
(Brazil) Kumahara (Brazil) Takahashi	6	6	11	11	9
14	(Romania) Dragoman (Romania) Samara	11	11	8	7	11
11	(India) Batra (India) Kamath	11	11	11
(Hungary) Póta (Hungary) Madarász	5	6	7
(South Africa) Patel (South Africa) Maphanga	3	2	3
2	(Japan) Hayata (Japan) Ito	11	11	11

Third round
6	(China) Chen (China) Wang Y.	11	11	11
14	(Romania) Dragoman (Romania) Samara	7	1	8
11	(India) Batra (India) Kamath	8	6	7
2	(Japan) Hayata (Japan) Ito	11	11	11

Quarterfinals
6	(China) Chen (China) Wang Y.	12	11	12
2	(Japan) Hayata (Japan) Ito	10	9	10
