= 2026 European Table Tennis Championships – Women's singles =

Women's singles at the 2026 European Table Tennis Championships
- Venue: Arena Stožice
- Location: Ljubljana, Slovenia
- Dates: 11–18 October

Medalists
gold medal	(Individual Neutral Athletes) Elizabet Abraamian
silver medal	(Germany) Annett Kaufmann
bronze medal	(France) Prithika Pavade
bronze medal	(Germany) Nina Mittelham

The women's singles competition of the 2026 European Table Tennis Championships was held from 11 to 18 October 2026.

== Format ==
The singles competition features a two-stage qualification.

=== Stage 1: Qualification Group Stage ===
- Eligibility: All players seeded 33 and beyond compete in this stage.
- Group Composition: Players are divided randomly into groups of 4.
- Match Length: Best-of-5 games.
- Advancement: The group winner advances to the Main Draw.

=== Stage 2: Main Draw ===
- The Bracket: A fixed single-elimination knockout bracket consisting of 64 players.
- Composition:
  - The top 32 seeded players
  - The 32 qualification group winners.
- Match Length: Best-of-7 games.

=== Tie-Breaking Regulations ===
If players are tied on match points within a group, positions are determined by:

1. Head-to-Head: The result of the match between the two tied players.
2. Game Ratio: If three players are tied, the ratio of games won divided by games lost in matches exclusively between the tied players.
3. Point Ratio: If still tied, the ratio of total rally points won divided by points lost between the tied players.

== Seeds ==
- Seeding was determined by the European Table Tennis Union European Rankings released in October 2026.

1. (Germany) Sabine Winter
2. (Romania) Bernadette Szőcs
3. (Germany) Han Ying
4. (Austria) Sofia Polcanova
5. (France) Yuan Jia Nan
6. (Germany) Nina Mittelham
7. (Spain) María Xiao
8. (France) Charlotte Lutz
9. (France) Prithika Pavade
10. (Romania) Elizabeta Samara
11. (Germany) Annett Kaufmann
12. (Romania) Andreea Dragoman
13. (Poland) Natalia Bajor
14. (Portugal) Shao Jieni
15. (Portugal) Yu Fu
16. (Wales) Anna Hursey
17. (Sweden) Christina Källberg
18. (Italy) Gaia Monfardini
19. (Serbia) Izabela Lupulesku
20. (Ukraine) Margaryta Pesotska
21. (Croatia) Lea Rakovac
22. (Italy) Giorgia Piccolin
23. (Croatia) Hana Arapović
24. (England) Tin-Tin Ho
25. (Ukraine) Veronika Matiunina
26. (Slovakia) Tatiana Kukulkova
27. (Turkey) Sibel Altinkaya
28. (Monaco) Yang Xiaoxin
29. (Luxembourg) Sarah De Nutte
30. (Serbia) Sabina Šurjan
31. (Croatia) Ivana Malobabić
32. (Switzerland) Rachel Moret

== Main draw ==
=== Finals ===
Semifinals
9	(France) Prithika Pavade	3
(Individual Neutral Athletes) Elizabet Abraamian	4
11	(Germany) Annett Kaufmann	4
6	(Germany) Nina Mittelham	3

Final
(Individual Neutral Athletes) Elizabet Abraamian	4
11	(Germany) Annett Kaufmann	3

=== Top half ===
==== Section 1 ====
Round of 64
1	(Germany) Sabine Winter	4
(Individual Neutral Athletes) Valeriia Kotsiur	0
(Ukraine) Anastasiya Dymytrenko	2
21	(Croatia) Lea Rakovac	4
17	(Sweden) Christina Källberg	3
(Romania) Adina Diaconu	4
(Portugal) Matilde Pinto	2
9	(France) Prithika Pavade	4
10	(Romania) Elizabeta Samara	3
(Turkey) Ece Haraç	4
(Sweden) Filippa Bergand	2
18	(Italy) Gaia Monfardini	4
24	(England) Tin-Tin Ho	3
(Romania) Elena Zaharia	4
(Netherlands) Men Shuohan	4
7	(Spain) María Xiao	3

Round of 32
1	(Germany) Sabine Winter	4
21	(Croatia) Lea Rakovac	0
(Romania) Adina Diaconu	2
9	(France) Prithika Pavade	4
(Turkey) Ece Haraç	2
18	(Italy) Gaia Monfardini	4
(Romania) Elena Zaharia	4
(Netherlands) Men Shuohan	2

Round of 16
1	(Germany) Sabine Winter	2
9	(France) Prithika Pavade	4
18	(Italy) Gaia Monfardini	2
(Romania) Elena Zaharia	4

Quarterfinals
9	(France) Prithika Pavade	4
(Romania) Elena Zaharia	0

==== Section 2 ====
Round of 64
5	(France) Yuan Jia Nan	4
(Croatia) Dora Ćosić	0
(Spain) María Berzosa	0
25	(Ukraine) Veronika Matiunina	4
22	(Italy) Giorgia Piccolin	3
(Individual Neutral Athletes) Elizabet Abraamian	4
(Slovenia) Ana Tofant	4
15	(Portugal) Fu Yu	1
16	(Wales) Anna Hursey	4
(Moldova) Alexandra Chiriacova	1
(France) Nina Guo Zheng	4
31	(Croatia) Ivana Malobabić	1
23	(Croatia) Hana Arapović	4
(Ukraine) Solomiya Yaremchuk	1
(Italy) Nicole Arlia	0
4	(Austria) Sofia Polcanova	4

Round of 32
5	(France) Yuan Jia Nan	4
25	(Ukraine) Veronika Matiunina	1
(Individual Neutral Athletes) Elizabet Abraamian	4
(Slovenia) Ana Tofant	1
16	(Wales) Anna Hursey	4
(France) Nina Guo Zheng	2
23	(Croatia) Hana Arapović	1
4	(Austria) Sofia Polcanova	4

Round of 16
5	(France) Yuan Jia Nan	0
(Individual Neutral Athletes) Elizabet Abraamian	4
16	(Wales) Anna Hursey	4
4	(Austria) Sofia Polcanova	3

Quarterfinals
(Individual Neutral Athletes) Elizabet Abraamian	4
16	(Wales) Anna Hursey	1

=== Bottom half ===
==== Section 3 ====
Round of 64
3	(Germany) Han Ying	4
(Poland) Katarzyna Węgrzyn	0
(Serbia) Reka Bezeg	0
29	(Luxembourg) Sarah De Nutte	4
26	(Slovakia) Tatiana Kukuľková	4
(Germany) Franziska Schreiner	2
(Norway) Martine Toftaker	0
14	(Portugal) Shao Jieni	4
11	(Germany) Annett Kaufmann	4
(Individual Neutral Athletes) Mariia Tailakova	1
(Poland) Anna Brzyska	1
28	(Monaco) Yang Xiaoxin	4
19	(Ukraine) Margaryta Pesotska	4
(Romania) Ioana Sîngeorzan	0
(Luxembourg) Ni Xia Lian	4
8	(France) Charlotte Lutz	2

Round of 32
3	(Germany) Han Ying	4
29	(Luxembourg) Sarah De Nutte	0
26	(Slovakia) Tatiana Kukuľková	4
14	(Portugal) Shao Jieni	1
11	(Germany) Annett Kaufmann	4
28	(Monaco) Yang Xiaoxin	2
19	(Ukraine) Margaryta Pesotska	3
(Luxembourg) Ni Xia Lian	4

Round of 16
3	(Germany) Han Ying	4
26	(Slovakia) Tatiana Kukuľková	0
11	(Germany) Annett Kaufmann	4
(Luxembourg) Ni Xia Lian	2

Quarterfinals
3	(Germany) Han Ying	0
11	(Germany) Annett Kaufmann	4

==== Section 4 ====
Round of 64
6	(Germany) Nina Mittelham	4
(Slovakia) Ema Labošová	0
(Lithuania) Kornelija Riliškytė	2
32	(Switzerland) Rachel Moret	4
27	(Turkey) Sibel Altınkaya	1
(Slovenia) Sara Tokić	4
(Austria) Nina Skerbinz	0
12	(Romania) Andreea Dragoman	4
13	(Poland) Natalia Bajor	4
(Belgium) Julie Van Hauwaert	0
(Czech Republic) Karin Grofová	4
20	(Serbia) Izabela Lupulesku	3
30	(Serbia) Sabina Šurjan	3
(France) Alexia Nodin	4
(Spain) Sofía-Xuan Zhang	1
2	(Romania) Bernadette Szőcs	4

Round of 32
6	(Germany) Nina Mittelham	4
32	(Switzerland) Rachel Moret	1
(Slovenia) Sara Tokić	2
12	(Romania) Andreea Dragoman	4
13	(Poland) Natalia Bajor	4
(Czech Republic) Karin Grofová	2
(France) Alexia Nodin	0
2	(Romania) Bernadette Szőcs	4

Round of 16
6	(Germany) Nina Mittelham	4
12	(Romania) Andreea Dragoman	3
13	(Poland) Natalia Bajor	3
2	(Romania) Bernadette Szőcs	4

Quarterfinals
6	(Germany) Nina Mittelham	4
2	(Romania) Bernadette Szőcs	1
