= 2026 World Team Table Tennis Championships – Women's team =

Women's team at the 2026 World Team Table Tennis Championships
- Venue: Copper Box Arena; OVO Arena Wembly
- Location: London, England
- Dates: 28 April – 10 May
- Teams: 64

Medalists
gold medal	Sun Yingsha; Wang Manyu; Chen Xingtong; Kuai Man; Wang Yidi	China
silver medal	Miwa Harimoto; Hina Hayata; Honoka Hashimoto; Miyu Nagasaki; Rin Mende	Japan
bronze medal	Bernadette Szőcs; Elizabeta Samara; Andreea Dragoman; Elena Zaharia; Adina Diaconu	Romania
bronze medal	Sabine Winter; Han Ying; Nina Mittelham; Annett Kaufmann; Yuan Wan	Germany

The women's team tournament of the 2026 World Team Table Tennis Championships was held from 28 April to 10 May 2026.

China won the title for the 24th time with a win over Japan.

== Playing system ==
All team matches in the event were played as a best-of-five series of individual matches, with the following order of play:

Match 1	Match 2	Match 3	Match 4	Match 5
A1 vs B2	A2 vs B1	A3 vs B3	A1 vs B1	A2 vs B2

The competition was divided into two stages:

=== Group stage ===
Teams seeded 1 to 7 and the host nation were drawn into Groups 1 and 2 (Stage 1a). All teams in Groups 1 and 2 were guaranteed a spot in the 32-team main draw of the knockout stage, as this phase of the competition was only to determine seeding.

The 56 remaining teams were drawn into Groups 3 to 16 (Stage 1b). The top two teams from each of these groups advanced; however, only the 14 winners and the top six runners-up advanced directly to the main draw. The remaining eight runners-up played in a preliminary round ahead of the main draw. The ranking of the runners-up was based on the win-loss ratios of team matches, individual matches, games, and points, in that order.

=== Knockout stage ===
After the four matches of the preliminary round, the main draw began with the Round of 32. Teams in Groups 1 and 2 were the top eight seeds in the draw, while the winners of Groups 3 to 10 were seeds 9 to 16.

== Teams ==
Stage 1a teams were.

- China
- Chinese Taipei
- England
- France
- Germany
- Japan
- Romania
- South Korea

All other teams started in Stage 1b.

== Group stage ==
=== Stage 1a ===
==== Group 1 ====
Pos	Team	Pld	W	L	MF	MA	MR	Pts
1	China	3	3	0	9	0	—	6
2	Romania	3	2	1	6	6	1.000	5
3	Chinese Taipei	3	1	2	4	7	0.571	4
4	South Korea	3	0	3	3	9	0.333	3

Source: World Table Tennis
Rules for classification: 1) points; 2) head-to-head points; 3) head-to-head match ratio.

2 May 2026; 10:00	China	3–0	Romania

	Individual matches
Sun Yingsha	3–0	Adina Diaconu	12–10, 11–5, 11–6
Kuai Man	3–0	Andreea Dragoman	11–6, 11–6, 11–2
Wang Yidi	3–0	Elena Zaharia	11–6, 11–4, 11–6

2 May 2026; 10:00	Chinese Taipei	3–1	South Korea

	Individual matches
Wu Ying-syuan	1–3	Kim Na-yeong	5–11, 6–11, 11–9, 10–12
Yeh Yi-tian	3–1	Shin Yu-bin	11–7, 8–11, 11–7, 11–9
Peng Yu-han	3–0	Park Ga-hyeon	11–9, 11–4, 12–10
Wu Ying-syuan	3–2	Shin Yu-bin	12–10, 11–8, 11–13, 8–11, 11–8

2 May 2026; 17:00	Romania	3–2	South Korea

	Individual matches
Bernadette Szőcs	3–0	Park Ga-hyeon	11–4, 12–10, 11–6
Elizabeta Samara	1–3	Kim Na-yeong	6–11, 11–8, 6–11, 6–11
Andreea Dragoman	2–3	Yang Ha-eun	8–11, 11–6, 11–6, 9–11, 7–11
Bernadette Szőcs	3–0	Kim Na-yeong	11–7, 11–6, 12–10
Elizabeta Samara	3–1	Park Ga-hyeon	7–11, 11–8, 11–8, 11–5

2 May 2026; 17:00	China	3–0	Chinese Taipei

	Individual matches
Kuai Man	3–0	Wu Ying-syuan	11–6, 11–4, 11–4
Wang Yidi	3–0	Yeh Yi-tian	11–7, 11–2, 11–9
Chen Xingtong	3–0	Chen Szu-yu	11–8, 11–6, 11–4

3 May 2026; 12:30	China	3–0	South Korea

	Individual matches
Sun Yingsha	3–0	Kim Na-yeong	11–8, 11–4, 11–5
Wang Yidi	3–0	Park Ga-hyeon	11–5, 11–6, 11–4
Kuai Man	3–0	Yoo Si-woo	11–6, 11–9, 11–3

3 May 2026; 17:00	Romania	3–1	Chinese Taipei

	Individual matches
Bernadette Szőcs	1–3	Peng Yu-han	9–11, 11–2, 6–11, 9–11
Andreea Dragoman	3–1	Yeh Yi-tian	12–10, 7–11, 19–17, 13–11
Elizabeta Samara	3–0	Wu Ying-syuan	12–10, 11–9, 11–7
Bernadette Szőcs	3–0	Yeh Yi-tian	11–6, 11–9, 12–10

==== Group 2 ====
Pos	Team	Pld	W	L	MF	MA	MR	Pts
1	Japan	3	3	0	9	2	4.500	6
2	Germany	3	2	1	7	4	1.750	5
3	France	3	1	2	5	6	0.833	4
4	England (H)	3	0	3	0	9	0.000	3

Source: World Table Tennis
Rules for classification: 1) points; 2) head-to-head points; 3) head-to-head match ratio.
(H) Hosts

2 May 2026; 10:00	Japan	3–0	England

	Individual matches
Miwa Harimoto	3–0	Tianer Yu	11–0, 11–2, 11–7
Hina Hayata	3–1	Tin-Tin Ho	12–10, 13–11, 6–11, 11–3
Miyu Nagasaki	3–0	Jasmin Wong	11–8, 11–7, 12–10

2 May 2026; 10:00	Germany	3–1	France

	Individual matches
Han Ying	1–3	Prithika Pavade	11–6, 9–11, 10–12, 11–13
Sabine Winter	3–0	Charlotte Lutz	11–9, 11–2, 11–6
Nina Mittelham	3–2	Jia Nan Yuan	8–11, 11–5, 11–9, 13–15, 11–8
Han Ying	3–1	Charlotte Lutz	11–4, 11–7, 8–11, 11–8

2 May 2026; 17:00	England	0–3	Germany

	Individual matches
Tin-Tin Ho	2–3	Annett Kaufmann	6–11, 8–11, 11–9, 13–11, 9–11
Tianer Yu	1–3	Nina Mittelham	2–11, 7–11, 11–9, 5–11
Ella Pashley	0–3	Yuan Wan	9–11, 5–11, 9–11

2 May 2026; 17:00	Japan	3–1	France

	Individual matches
Miwa Harimoto	3–0	Charlotte Lutz	11–6, 11–8, 11–7
Hina Hayata	3–0	Prithika Pavade	11–6, 12–10, 11–8
Rin Mende	1–3	Jia Nan Yuan	9–11, 6–11, 11–8, 6–11
Miwa Harimoto	3–0	Prithika Pavade	11–5, 11–4, 11–4

3 May 2026; 12:30	Germany	1–3	Japan

	Individual matches
Sabine Winter	3–2	Honoka Hashimoto	9–11, 11–6, 8–11, 11–8, 11–8
Annett Kaufmann	0–3	Miwa Harimoto	4–11, 10–12, 7–11
Han Ying	1–3	Hina Hayata	4–11, 11–8, 6–11, 5–11
Sabine Winter	1–3	Miwa Harimoto	6–11, 4–11, 11–7, 7–11

3 May 2026; 12:30	France	3–0	England

	Individual matches
Prithika Pavade	3–0	Ella Pashley	11–9, 11–5, 12–10
Jia Nan Yuan	3–2	Tin-Tin Ho	9–11, 11–7, 9–11, 11–5, 12–10
Charlotte Lutz	3–0	Tianer Yu	11–5, 11–8, 11–3

=== Stage 1b ===
==== Group 3 ====
Pos	Team	Pld	W	L	MF	MA	MR	Pts	Qualification	(Egypt)	(Belgium)	(Algeria)	(South Africa)
1	Egypt	3	3	0	9	0	—	6	Main draw		3–0	3–0	3–0
2	Belgium	3	2	1	6	5	1.200	5	Main draw or preliminary round based of ranking			3–0	3–2
3	Algeria	3	1	2	3	7	0.429	4					3–1
4	South Africa	3	0	3	3	9	0.333	3					

Source: World Table Tennis
Rules for classification: 1) points; 2) head-to-head points; 3) head-to-head match ratio.

==== Group 4 ====
Pos	Team	Pld	W	L	MF	MA	MR	Pts	Qualification	(Hong Kong)	(Netherlands)	(Mexico)	(Macau)
1	Hong Kong	3	3	0	9	1	9.000	6	Main draw		3–1	3–0	3–0
2	Netherlands	3	2	1	7	3	2.333	5	Main draw or preliminary round based of ranking			3–0	3–0
3	Mexico	3	1	2	3	6	0.500	4					3–0
4	Macau	3	0	3	0	9	0.000	3					

Source: World Table Tennis
Rules for classification: 1) points; 2) head-to-head points; 3) head-to-head match ratio.

==== Group 5 ====
Pos	Team	Pld	W	L	MF	MA	MR	Pts	Qualification	(Brazil)	(Kazakhstan)	(Czech Republic)	(Mongolia)
1	Brazil	3	3	0	9	2	4.500	6	Main draw		3–1	3–1	3–0
2	Kazakhstan	3	2	1	7	5	1.400	5	Main draw or preliminary round based of ranking			3–2	3–0
3	Czech Republic	3	1	2	6	6	1.000	4					3–0
4	Mongolia	3	0	3	0	9	0.000	3					

Source: World Table Tennis
Rules for classification: 1) points; 2) head-to-head points; 3) head-to-head match ratio.

==== Group 6 ====
Pos	Team	Pld	W	L	MF	MA	MR	Pts	Qualification	(India)	(Ukraine)	(Rwanda)	(Uganda)
1	India	3	3	0	9	2	4.500	6	Main draw		3–2	3–0	w/o
2	Ukraine	3	2	1	8	3	2.667	5	Main draw or preliminary round based of ranking			3–0	w/o
3	Rwanda	3	1	2	3	6	0.500	4					w/o
4	Uganda	3	0	3	0	9	0.000	0					

Source: World Table Tennis
Rules for classification: 1) points; 2) head-to-head points; 3) head-to-head match ratio.

==== Group 7 ====
Pos	Team	Pld	W	L	MF	MA	MR	Pts	Qualification	(Sweden)	(Canada)	(Sri Lanka)	(Costa Rica)
1	Sweden	3	3	0	9	2	4.500	6	Main draw		3–2	3–0	3–0
2	Canada	3	2	1	8	3	2.667	5	Main draw or preliminary round based of ranking			3–0	3–0
3	Sri Lanka	3	1	2	3	7	0.429	4					3–1
4	Costa Rica	3	0	3	1	9	0.111	3					

Source: World Table Tennis
Rules for classification: 1) points; 2) head-to-head points; 3) head-to-head match ratio.

==== Group 8 ====
Pos	Team	Pld	W	L	MF	MA	MR	Pts	Qualification	(Serbia)	(Thailand)	(Slovenia)	(Benin)
1	Serbia	3	3	0	9	3	3.000	6	Main draw		3–2	3–1	3–0
2	Thailand	3	2	1	8	4	2.000	5	Main draw or preliminary round based of ranking			3–1	3–0
3	Slovenia	3	1	2	5	6	0.833	4					3–0
4	Benin	3	0	3	0	9	0.000	3					

Source: World Table Tennis
Rules for classification: 1) points; 2) head-to-head points; 3) head-to-head match ratio.

==== Group 9 ====
Pos	Team	Pld	W	L	MF	MA	MR	Pts	Qualification	(North Korea)	(Poland)	(Spain)	(Democratic Republic of the Congo)
1	North Korea	3	3	0	9	0	—	6	Main draw		3–0	3–0	w/o
2	Poland	3	2	1	6	4	1.500	5	Main draw or preliminary round based of ranking			3–1	w/o
3	Spain	3	1	2	4	6	0.667	4					w/o
4	Democratic Republic of the Congo	3	0	3	0	9	0.000	0					

Source: World Table Tennis
Rules for classification: 1) points; 2) head-to-head points; 3) head-to-head match ratio.

==== Group 10 ====
Pos	Team	Pld	W	L	MF	MA	MR	Pts	Qualification	(Portugal)	(Luxembourg)	(Guatemala)	(Barbados)
1	Portugal	3	3	0	9	0	—	6	Main draw		3–0	3–0	w/o
2	Luxembourg	3	2	1	6	3	2.000	5	Main draw or preliminary round based of ranking			3–0	w/o
3	Guatemala	3	1	2	3	6	0.500	4					w/o
4	Barbados	3	0	3	0	9	0.000	0					

Source: World Table Tennis
Rules for classification: 1) points; 2) head-to-head points; 3) head-to-head match ratio.

==== Group 11 ====
Pos	Team	Pld	W	L	MF	MA	MR	Pts	Qualification	(Wales)	(Australia)	(Uzbekistan)	(Nigeria)
1	Wales	3	3	0	9	2	4.500	6	Main draw		3–2	3–0	3–0
2	Australia	3	2	1	8	5	1.600	5	Main draw or preliminary round based of ranking			3–1	3–1
3	Uzbekistan	3	1	2	4	6	0.667	4					3–0
4	Nigeria	3	0	3	1	9	0.111	3					

Source: World Table Tennis
Rules for classification: 1) points; 2) head-to-head points; 3) head-to-head match ratio.

==== Group 12 ====
Pos	Team	Pld	W	L	MF	MA	MR	Pts	Qualification	(United States)	(Malaysia)	(Dominican Republic)	(Namibia)
1	United States	3	3	0	9	1	9.000	6	Main draw		3–1	3–0	w/o
2	Malaysia	3	2	1	7	3	2.333	5	Main draw or preliminary round based of ranking			3–0	w/o
3	Dominican Republic	3	1	2	3	6	0.500	4					w/o
4	Namibia	3	0	3	0	9	0.000	0					

Source: World Table Tennis
Rules for classification: 1) points; 2) head-to-head points; 3) head-to-head match ratio.

==== Group 13 ====
Pos	Team	Pld	W	L	MF	MA	MR	Pts	Qualification	(Italy)	(Croatia)	(Turkey)	(Argentina)
1	Italy	3	3	0	9	0	—	6	Main draw		3–0	3–0	3–0
2	Croatia	3	2	1	6	5	1.200	5	Main draw or preliminary round based of ranking			3–2	3–0
3	Turkey	3	1	2	5	6	0.833	4					3–0
4	Argentina	3	0	3	0	9	0.000	3					

Source: World Table Tennis
Rules for classification: 1) points; 2) head-to-head points; 3) head-to-head match ratio.

==== Group 14 ====
Pos	Team	Pld	W	L	MF	MA	MR	Pts	Qualification	(Austria)	(Puerto Rico)	(Angola)	(Ghana)
1	Austria	3	3	0	9	1	9.000	6	Main draw		3–1	3–0	3–0
2	Puerto Rico	3	2	1	7	3	2.333	5	Main draw or preliminary round based of ranking			3–0	w/o
3	Angola	3	1	2	3	8	0.375	4					3–2
4	Ghana	3	0	3	2	9	0.222	2					

Source: World Table Tennis
Rules for classification: 1) points; 2) head-to-head points; 3) head-to-head match ratio.

==== Group 15 ====
Pos	Team	Pld	W	L	MF	MA	MR	Pts	Qualification	(Singapore)	(Hungary)	(Greece)	(Ethiopia)
1	Singapore	3	3	0	9	0	—	6	Main draw		3–0	3–0	w/o
2	Hungary	3	2	1	6	5	1.200	5	Main draw or preliminary round based of ranking			3–2	w/o
3	Greece	3	1	2	5	6	0.833	4					w/o
4	Ethiopia	3	0	3	0	9	0.000	0					

Source: World Table Tennis
Rules for classification: 1) points; 2) head-to-head points; 3) head-to-head match ratio.

==== Group 16 ====
Pos	Team	Pld	W	L	MF	MA	MR	Pts	Qualification	(Slovakia)	(Switzerland)	(Chile)	(Madagascar)
1	Slovakia	3	3	0	9	1	9.000	6	Main draw		3–0	3–1	3–0
2	Switzerland	3	2	1	6	5	1.200	5	Main draw or preliminary round based of ranking			3–2	3–0
3	Chile	3	1	2	6	6	1.000	4					3–0
4	Madagascar	3	0	3	0	9	0.000	3					

Source: World Table Tennis
Rules for classification: 1) points; 2) head-to-head points; 3) head-to-head match ratio.

==== Ranking of second-placed teams (Groups 3–16) ====
Pos	Grp	Team	W	L	MF	MA	MR	GF	GA	GR	Qualification
1	6	Ukraine	2	1	8	3	2.667	26	12	2.167	Main draw
2	7	Canada	2	1	8	3	2.667	25	13	1.923	Main draw
3	4	Netherlands	2	1	7	3	2.333	22	9	2.444	Main draw
4	14	Puerto Rico	2	1	7	3	2.333	22	10	2.200 (Note: Point ratio of Puerto Rico: 1.867 (308/165); Malaysia: 1.620 (324/200))	Main draw
5	12	Malaysia	2	1	7	3	2.333	22	10	2.200	Main draw
6	10	Luxembourg	2	1	6	3	2.000	22	9	2.444	Main draw
7	8	Thailand	2	1	8	4	2.000	31	19	1.632	Preliminary round
8	11	Australia	2	1	8	5	1.600				Preliminary round
9	9	Poland	2	1	6	4	1.500				Preliminary round
10	5	Kazakhstan	2	1	7	5	1.400				Preliminary round
11	3	Belgium	2	1	6	5	1.200	23	17	1.353	Preliminary round
12	13	Croatia	2	1	6	5	1.200	24	18	1.333	Preliminary round
13	15	Hungary	2	1	6	5	1.200	21	17	1.235	Preliminary round
14	16	Switzerland	2	1	6	5	1.200	22	21	1.048	Preliminary round

Source: World Table Tennis
Rules for classification: 1) match ratio; 2) game ratio; 3) point ratio.

== Knockout stage ==
=== Preliminary round ===
Match 1
1 May
Kazakhstan	3
Belgium	0

Match 2
1 May
Hungary	2
Switzerland	3

Match 3
1 May
Poland	3
Thailand	2

Match 4
1 May
Croatia	3
Australia	2

=== Main draw ===
==== Finals ====
Semi-finals
9 May
China	3
Romania	0
9 May
Germany	0
Japan	3

Final
10 May
China	3
Japan	2

==== Top half ====
===== Section 1 =====
Round of 32
4 May
China	3
Poland	1
4 May
Kazakhstan	1
Sweden	3
5 May
Singapore	3
Serbia	1
4 May
Canada	0
South Korea	3

Round of 16
6 May
China	3
Sweden	0
6 May
Singapore	1
South Korea	3

Quarterfinals
7 May
China	3
South Korea	0

===== Section 2 =====
Round of 32
5 May
France	3
Switzerland	0
5 May
Italy	3
Portugal	1
5 May
Egypt	3
Slovakia	2
4 May
Netherlands	0
Romania	3

Round of 16
6 May
France	3
Italy	0
6 May
Egypt	2
Romania	3

Quarterfinals
8 May
France	1
Romania	3

==== Bottom Half ====
===== Section 3 =====
Round of 32
4 May
Germany	3
Malaysia	0
4 May
Austria	0
North Korea	3
4 May
Hong Kong	3
Wales	2
5 May
Puerto Rico	2
Chinese Taipei	3

Round of 16
6 May
Germany	3
North Korea	0
6 May
Hong Kong	3
Chinese Taipei	2

Quarterfinals
7 May
Germany	3
Hong Kong	1

===== Section 4 =====
Round of 32
4 May
England	1
Ukraine	3
5 May
United States	3
India	1
5 May
Brazil	2
Luxembourg	3
5 May
Croatia	0
Japan	3

Round of 16
6 May
Ukraine	3
United States	2
6 May
Luxembourg	0
Japan	3

Quarterfinals
8 May
Ukraine	0
Japan	3

=== Round of 32 ===
4 May 2026; 10:00	Hong Kong	3–2	Wales

	Individual matches
Doo Hoi Kem	3–1	Danielle Kelly	11–5, 6–11, 11–5, 11–4
Su Tsz Tung	1–3	Anna Hursey	11–9, 5–11, 5–11, 4–11
Ng Wing Lam	3–2	Charlotte Carey	8–11, 12–10, 11–4, 8–11, 12–10
Doo Hoi Kem	0–3	Anna Hursey	13–15, 6–11, 12–14
Su Tsz Tung	3–0	Danielle Kelly	11–7, 11–7, 11–8

4 May 2026; 10:00	Sweden	3–1	Kazakhstan

	Individual matches
Linda Bergström	3–0	Sarvinoz Mirkadirova	11–6, 11–8, 11–9
Christina Källberg	2–3	Zauresh Akasheva	8–11, 11–8, 8–11, 11–6, 10–12
Filippa Bergand	3–0	Anel Bakhyt	11–7, 11–8, 11–6
Linda Bergström	3–1	Zauresh Akasheva	10–12, 11–6, 11–7, 11–7

4 May 2026; 12:30	China	3–1	Poland

	Individual matches
Sun Yingsha	3–0	Zuzanna Wielgos	11–3, 11–6, 11–8
Kuai Man	1–3	Natalia Bajor	11–3, 9–11, 9–11, 13–15
Wang Manyu	3–0	Katarzyna Wegrzyn	11–5, 11–4, 11–4
Sun Yingsha	3–0	Natalia Bajor	11–2, 11–3, 11–5

4 May 2026; 12:30	England	1–3	Ukraine

	Individual matches
Tin-Tin Ho	3–1	Tetiana Bilenko	4–11, 11–6, 11–9, 11–7
Tianer Yu	0–3	Margaryta Pesotska	5–11, 6–11, 6–11
Ella Pashley	0–3	Veronika Matiunina	9–11, 9–11, 9–11
Tin-Tin Ho	0–3	Margaryta Pesotska	4–11, 7–11, 8–11

4 May 2026; 17:00	North Korea	3–0	Austria

	Individual matches
Kim Kum Yong	3–0	Karoline Mischek	11–5, 11–6, 11–3
Pyon Song Gyong	3–0	Sofia Polcanova	11–8, 11–9, 11–8
Cha Su Yong	3–1	Nina Skerbinz	11–4, 11–13, 11–5, 11–4

4 May 2026; 19:30	Germany	3–0	Malaysia

	Individual matches
Sabine Winter	3–0	Karen Lyne	11–2, 11–6, 11–7
Han Ying	3–0	Ai Xin Tee	11–7, 11–4, 11–2
Nina Mittelham	3–1	Chang Li Sian	11–6, 11–8, 8–11, 11–4

4 May 2026; 19:30	Canada	0–3	South Korea

	Individual matches
Sunny Zhang	0–3	Kim Na-yeong	6–11, 4–11, 5–11
Mo Zhang	0–3	Shin Yu-bin	3–11, 2–11, 4–11
Ivy Pan	0–3	Yang Ha-eun	6–11, 3–11, 3–11

4 May 2026; 19:30	Romania	3–0	Netherlands

	Individual matches
Bernadette Szőcs	3–2	Britt Eerland	9–11, 10–12, 11–9, 11–4, 11–7
Elizabeta Samara	3–2	Li Jie	11–3, 3–11, 5–11, 11–7, 11–8
Andreea Dragoman	3–0	Tanja Helle	11–3, 11–3, 11–4

5 May 2026; 10:00	Croatia	0–3	Japan

	Individual matches
Hana Arapović	0–3	Honoka Hashimoto	7–11, 4–11, 9–11
Dora Ćosić	0–3	Miwa Harimoto	6–11, 2–11, 6–11
Andrea Pavlović	0–3	Rin Mende	1–11, 2–11, 9–11

5 May 2026; 10:00	Italy	3–1	Portugal

	Individual matches
Gaia Monfardini	2–3	Fu Yu	11–9, 11–7, 3–11, 7–11, 5–11
Giorgia Piccolin	3–2	Shao Jieni	8–11, 4–11, 11–6, 11–9, 11–9
Debora Vivarelli	3–1	Matilde Pinto	10–12, 11–9, 11–5, 13–11
Gaia Monfardini	3–1	Shao Jieni	12–10, 13–11, 6–11, 11–8

5 May 2026; 12:30	Puerto Rico	2–3	Chinese Taipei

	Individual matches
Adriana Díaz	3–2	Peng Yu-han	9–11, 11–2, 10–12, 15–13, 11–7
Edmarie Leon	0–3	Yeh Yi-tian	5–11, 5–11, 9–11
Brianna Burgos	1–3	Chen Szu-yu	6–11, 11–9, 9–11, 12–14
Adriana Díaz	3–0	Yeh Yi-tian	11–8, 11–8, 11–5
Edmarie Leon	0–3	Peng Yu-han	9–11, 10–12, 9–11

5 May 2026; 12:30	Singapore	3–1	Serbia

	Individual matches
Zeng Jian	1–3	Izabela Lupulesku	7–11, 11–8, 8–11, 12–14
Zhao Yun Tan	3–1	Sabina Šurjan	2–11, 12–10, 11–4, 11–8
Ser Lin Qian	3–1	Aneta Maksuti	8–11, 11–6, 11–7, 14–12
Zeng Jian	3–2	Sabina Šurjan	11–9 6–11, 13–15, 11–6, 13–11

5 May 2026; 17:00	France	3–0	Switzerland

	Individual matches
Prithika Pavade	3–0	Rachel Moret	11–4, 11–6, 11–6
Jia Nan Yuan	3–0	Fanny Doutaz	11–7, 11–2, 11–3
Charlotte Lutz	3–0	Michelle Wu	11–4, 11–7, 11–5

5 May 2026; 17:00	Brazil	2–3	Luxembourg

	Individual matches
Bruna Takahashi	3–1	Sarah De Nutte	11–9, 11–7, 6–11, 11–9
Giulia Takahashi	2–3	Ni Xialian	11–9, 10–12, 6–11, 11–9, 8–11
Laura Watanabe	2–3	Enisa Sadikovic	9–11, 13–11, 8–11, 11–9, 7–11
Bruna Takahashi	3–2	Ni Xialian	11–5, 11–9, 8–11, 10–12, 12–10
Guilia Takahashi	0–3	Sarah De Nutte	9–11, 7–11, 4–11

5 May 2026; 19:30	Egypt	3–2	Slovakia

	Individual matches
Hana Goda	3–1	Tatiana Kukuľková	11–6, 10–12, 11–8, 11–7
Dina Meshref	2–3	Barbora Várady	8–11, 13–11, 11–2, 13–15, 6–11
Mariam Al-Hodaby	1–3	Ema Labosova	16–14, 7–11, 7–11, 7–11
Hana Goda	3–1	Barbora Várady	9–11, 11–7, 12–10, 11–7
Dina Meshref	3–0	Tatiana Kukuľková	11–5, 11–9, 11–7

5 May 2026; 19:30	United States	3–1	India

	Individual matches
Sally Moyland	3–0	Yashaswini Ghorpade	11–8, 11–8, 11–7
Jessica Reyes	1–3	Manika Batra	2–11, 7–11, 11–8, 4–11
Lily Zhang	3–0	Diya Chitale	11–8, 11–7, 13–11
Sally Moyland	3–1	Manika Batra	10–12, 11–9, 11–3, 13–11

=== Round of 16 ===
6 May 2026; 10:00	Luxembourg	0–3	Japan

	Individual matches
Sarah De Nutte	0–3	Miwa Harimoto	8–11, 5–11, 5–11
Enisa Sadikovic	0–3	Honoka Hashimoto	3–11, 2–11, 5–11
Ni Xialian	0–3	Hina Hayata	3–11, 4–11, 0–11

6 May 2026; 10:00	Hong Kong	3–2	Chinese Taipei

	Individual matches
Doo Hoi Kem	3–1	Peng Yu-han	11–3, 10–12, 11–7, 11–8
Su Tsz Tung	2–3	Yeh Yi-tian	11–9, 7–11, 6–11, 11–6, 7–11
Ng Wing Lam	3–1	Chen Szu-yu	6–11, 11–2, 15–13, 11–5
Doo Hoi Kem	2–3	Yeh Yi-tian	5–11, 11–8, 11–4, 9–11, 7–11
Su Tsz Tung	3–0	Peng Yu-han	13–11, 11–9, 11–4

6 May 2026; 12:30	Sweden	0–3	China

	Individual matches
Linda Bergström	0–3	Sun Yingsha	3–11, 4–11, 4–11
Christina Källberg	0–3	Wang Manyu	5–11, 0–11, 3–11
Filippa Bergand	0–3	Wang Yidi	7–11, 4–11, 4–11

6 May 2026; 12:30	Singapore	1–3	South Korea

	Individual matches
Zeng Jian	0–3	Kim Na-yeong	5–11, 7–11, 11–13
Ser Lin Qian	1–3	Shin Yu-bin	8–11, 8–11, 11–9, 4–11
Loy Ming Ying	3–0	Yang Ha-eun	11–3, 11–7, 11–9
Zeng Jian	1–3	Shin Yu-bin	12–10, 5–11, 9–11, 8–11

6 May 2026; 17:00	Ukraine	3–2	United States

	Individual matches
Margaryta Pesotska	3–0	Jessica Reyes	11–8, 11–7, 11–5
Veronika Matiunina	0–3	Sally Moyland	6–11, 12–14, 6–11
Tetiana Bilenko	1–3	Lily Zhang	9–11, 11–7, 10–12, 9–11
Margaryta Pesotska	3–2	Sally Moyland	12–14, 11–2, 12–14, 12–10, 11–7
Veronika Matiunina	3–0	Jessica Reyes	11–5, 11–6, 11–8

6 May 2026; 17:00	Romania	3–2	Egypt

	Individual matches
Bernadette Szőcs	3–0	Dina Meshref	11–9, 11–6, 11–8
Andreea Dragoman	2–3	Hana Goda	11–8, 5–11, 4–11, 11–6, 2–11
Elizabeta Samara	3–0	Farida Badawy	14–12, 11–6, 11–7
Bernadette Szőcs	1–3	Hana Goda	6–11, 11–6, 9–11, 7–11
Andreea Dragoman	3–2	Dina Meshref	17–19, 11–6, 6–11, 11–9, 11–8

6 May 2026; 19:30	France	3–0	Italy

	Individual matches
Jia Nan Yuan	3–1	Gaia Monfardini	11–9, 11–5, 6–11, 11–7
Prithika Pavade	3–0	Giorgia Piccolin	11–4, 11–2, 11–4
Charlotte Lutz	3–0	Debora Vivarelli	11–5, 11–8, 11–7

6 May 2026; 19:30	North Korea	0–3	Germany

	Individual matches
Kim Kum Yong	1–3	Annett Kaufmann	7–11, 7–11, 11–4, 6–11
Pyon Song Gyong	0–3	Sabine Winter	9–11, 7–11, 4–11
Cha Su Yong	0–3	Han Ying	8–11, 5–11, 9–11

=== Quarterfinals ===
7 May 2026; 10:00	South Korea	0–3	China

	Individual matches
Shin Yu-bin	0–3	Wang Manyu	1–11, 4–11, 4–11
Kim Na-yeong	2–3	Sun Yingsha	7–11, 11–7, 11–7, 4–11, 9–11
Park Ga-hyeon	1–3	Wang Yidi	5–11, 3–11, 12–10, 2–11

7 May 2026; 17:00	Germany	3–1	Hong Kong

	Individual matches
Sabine Winter	3–2	Doo Hoi Kem	10–12, 8–11, 11–8, 11–9, 11–4
Han Ying	3–2	Ng Wing Lam	11–9, 7–11, 15–17, 13–11, 15–13
Annett Kaufmann	1–3	Su Tsz Tung	10–12, 11–8, 8–11, 4–11
Sabine Winter	3–0	Ng Wing Lam	11–1, 11–5, 11–6

8 May 2026; 10:00	Ukraine	0–3	Japan

	Individual matches
Anastasiya Dymytrenko	0–3	Honoka Hashimoto	9–11, 7–11, 4–11
Veronika Matiunina	0–3	Miwa Harimoto	9–11, 5–11, 6–11
Tetiana Bilenko	0–3	Hina Hayata	5–11, 6–11, 5–11

8 May 2026; 17:00	France	1–3	Romania

	Individual matches
Jia Nan Yuan	3–2	Adina Diaconu	7–11, 13–11, 11–8, 8–11, 11–5
Prithika Pavade	2–3	Bernadette Szőcs	7–11, 9–11, 13–11, 11–5, 2–11
Charlotte Lutz	1–3	Andreea Dragoman	6–11, 7–11, 11–6, 6–11
Jia Nan Yuan	1–3	Bernadette Szőcs	12–10, 6–11, 4–11, 12–14

=== Semifinals ===
9 May 2026; 10:00	Japan	3–0	Germany

	Individual matches
Miwa Harimoto	3–1	Han Ying	5–11, 12–10, 11–3, 11–8
Hina Hayata	3–2	Sabine Winter	10–12, 6–11, 11–5, 11–9, 11–6
Honoka Hashimoto	3–0	Nina Mittelham	11–8, 11–5, 11–5

9 May 2026; 12:30	China	3–0	Romania

	Individual matches
Sun Yingsha	3–0	Elizabeta Samara	11–3, 11–4, 11–5
Wang Manyu	3–0	Bernadette Szőcs	11–4, 11–9, 12–10
Kuai Man	3–0	Andreea Dragoman	12–10, 11–6, 12–10

=== Final ===
10 May 2026; 11:00	Japan	2–3	China

	Individual matches
Miwa Harimoto	3–2	Wang Manyu	11–4, 11–9, 6–11, 4–11, 11–4
Hina Hayata	0–3	Sun Yingsha	7–11, 7–11, 8–11
Honoka Hashimoto	3–1	Kuai Man	11–6, 5–11, 11–6, 11–8
Miwa Harimoto	0–3	Sun Yingsha	2–11, 4–11, 6–11
Hina Hayata	0–3	Wang Manyu	7–11, 7–11, 5–11
