= 2026 European Table Tennis Championships – Mixed doubles =

Mixed doubles at the 2026 European Table Tennis Championships
- Venue: Arena Stožice
- Location: Ljubljana, Slovenia
- Dates: 13–18 October
- Competitors: 70 pairs

Medalists
gold medal	(Germany) Benedikt Duda (Germany) Nina Mittelham
silver medal	(France) Alexis Lebrun (France) Charlotte Lutz
bronze medal	(Romania) Eduard Ionescu (Romania) Bernadette Szőcs
bronze medal	(Sweden) Kristian Karlsson (Sweden) Christina Källberg

The mixed doubles competition of the 2026 European Table Tennis Championships is being held from 13 to 18 October 2026.

== Format ==
The mixed doubles competition features a two-stage qualification.

=== Stage 1: Qualification Stage ===
- Eligibility: All pairs seeded 17 and beyond compete in qualification knockout stage to decide 16 winners.
- Match Length: Best-of-5 games.

=== Stage 2: Main Draw ===
- Composition:
  - The top 16 seeded pairs
  - The 16 qualification winners.
- Match Length: Best-of-5 games.

== Seeds ==
- Seeding was determined by the International Table Tennis Federation World Ranking (Doubles Individual) released on 5 October 2026.
1. (Spain) Álvaro Robles / (Spain) María Xiao
2. (France) Alexis Lebrun / (France) Charlotte Lutz
3. (Slovakia) Ľubomír Pištej / (Slovakia) Tatiana Kukulkova
4. (Romania) Eduard Ionescu / (Romania) Bernadette Szőcs
5. (Sweden) Kristian Karlsson / (Sweden) Christina Källberg
6. (England) Connor Green / (England) Tin-Tin Ho
7. (Poland) Marek Badowski / (Poland) Zuzanna Wielgos
8. (Croatia) Ivor Ban / (Croatia) Hana Arapović
9. (Individual Neutral Athletes) Evgeny Tikhonov / (Individual Neutral Athletes) Mariia Tailakova
10. (Denmark) Anders Lind / (Wales) Anna Hursey
11. (Turkey) Abdullah Yigenler / (Turkey) Ece Harac
12. (Individual Neutral Athletes) Vladimir Sidorenko / (Individual Neutral Athletes) Elizabet Abraamian
13. (Germany) Patrick Franziska / (Germany) Annett Kaufmann
14. (Poland) Maciej Kubik / (Poland) Natalia Bajor
15. (Luxembourg) Luka Mladenovic / (Luxembourg) Ni Xia Lian
16. (Germany) Benedikt Duda / (Germany) Nina Mittelham

== Main draw ==
=== Final ===
Final
16	(Germany) Duda (Germany) Mittelham (gold)	3
2	(France) Lebrun (France) Lutz (silver)	2

=== Upper Half ===
Round of 32
1	(Spain) Robles (Spain) Xiao	3
(Ukraine) Grebeniuk (Ukraine) Dymytrenko	1
(Turkey) Gunduz (Turkey) Altinkaya	1
16	(Germany) Duda (Germany) Mittelham	3
12	(Individual Neutral Athletes) Sidorenko (Individual Neutral Athletes) Abraamian	0
(Moldova) Ursu (Moldova) Chiriacova	3
(Portugal) Monteiro (Portugal) Leal	0
7	(Poland) Badowski (Poland) Wielgos	3
8	(Croatia) Ban (Croatia) Arapović	1
(France) Poret (France) Pavade	3
(Estonia) Moos (Estonia) Avameri	0
13	(Germany) Franziska (Germany) Kaufmann	3
10	(Denmark) Lind (Wales) Hursey	3
(Romania) Movileanu (Romania) Dragoman	0
(Czech Republic) Martinko (Czech Republic) Polakova	1
4	(Romania) Ionescu (Romania) Szőcs	3

Round of 16
1	(Spain) Robles (Spain) Xiao	0
16	(Germany) Duda (Germany) Mittelham	3
(Moldova) Ursu (Moldova) Chiriacova	3
7	(Poland) Badowski (Poland) Wielgos	2
(France) Poret (France) Pavade	3
13	(Germany) Franziska (Germany) Kaufmann	1
10	(Denmark) Lind (Wales) Hursey	1
4	(Romania) Ionescu (Romania) Szőcs	3

Quarterfinals
16	(Germany) Duda (Germany) Mittelham	3
(Moldova) Ursu (Moldova) Chiriacova	0
(France) Poret (France) Pavade	2
4	(Romania) Ionescu (Romania) Szőcs	3

Semifinals
16	(Germany) Duda (Germany) Mittelham	3
4	(Romania) Ionescu (Romania) Szőcs (bronze)	0

=== Lower Half ===
Round of 32
3	(Slovakia) Pištej (Slovakia) Kukulkova	1
(Serbia) Levajac (Serbia) Lupulesku	3
(Portugal) Geraldo (Portugal) Santa	3
11	(Turkey) Yigenler (Turkey) Harac	1
14	(Poland) Kubik (Poland) Bajor	3
(Spain) Berzosa (Spain) Berzosa	1
(Israel) Avivi (Israel) Davidov	2
5	(Sweden) Karlsson (Sweden) Källberg	3
6	(England) Green (England) Ho	1
(Sweden) Ranefur (Sweden) Bergand	3
(Hungary) Szantosi (Hungary) Nagy	1
15	(Luxembourg) Mladenovic (Luxembourg) Ni	3
9	(Individual Neutral Athletes) Tikhonov (Individual Neutral Athletes) Tailakova	3
(Luxembourg) Van Dessel (Luxembourg) De Nutte	1
(Italy) Stoyanov (Italy) Piccolin	0
2	(France) Lebrun (France) Lutz	3

Round of 16
(Serbia) Levajac (Serbia) Lupulesku	2
(Portugal) Geraldo (Portugal) Santa	3
14	(Poland) Kubik (Poland) Bajor	0
5	(Sweden) Karlsson (Sweden) Källberg	3
(Sweden) Ranefur (Sweden) Bergand	0
15	(Luxembourg) Mladenovic (Luxembourg) Ni	3
9	(Individual Neutral Athletes) Tikhonov (Individual Neutral Athletes) Tailakova	1
2	(France) Lebrun (France) Lutz	3

Quarterfinals
(Portugal) Geraldo (Portugal) Santa	0
5	(Sweden) Karlsson (Sweden) Källberg	3
15	(Luxembourg) Mladenovic (Luxembourg) Ni	2
2	(France) Lebrun (France) Lutz	3

Semifinals
5	(Sweden) Karlsson (Sweden) Källberg (bronze)	2
2	(France) Lebrun (France) Lutz	3
