= 2022 World Team Table Tennis Championships – Women's team =

Women's team at the 2022 World Team Table Tennis Championships
- Venue: High Technology Zone Sports Center
- Location: Chengdu, China
- Dates: 30 September – 8 October
- Teams: 28

Medalists
gold medal	Sun Yingsha; Chen Meng; Wang Manyu; Wang Yidi; Chen Xingtong	China
silver medal	Hina Hayata; Mima Ito; Miyuu Kihara; Miyu Nagasaki; Hitomi Sato	Japan
bronze medal	Chen Szu-yu; Cheng I-ching; Liu Hsing-yin; Li Yu-jhun; Huang Yi-hua	Chinese Taipei
bronze medal	Han Ying; Nina Mittelham; Shan Xiaona; Sabine Winter; Annett Kaufmann	Germany

The women's team tournament of the 2022 World Team Table Tennis Championships was held from 30 September to 8 October 2022.

China won the final against Japan, after not losing a single match during the tournament.

== Format ==
The 28 teams were drawn into six groups. After a round robin in each group, the top two teams in group and four highest-ranked third-placed teams played in the knockout stage. A team match consisted of five singles matches, where each singles match was decided in best-of-5 games.

== Draw ==
The draw took place on 28 September. The top six teams in the world ranking were seeded as top of each group.

Group 1–3
Seeds	China (1); Japan (2); Hong Kong (3)
Pot 2	Brazil (14); United States (15); Hungary (16)
Pot 3	France (17); Puerto Rico (18); Poland (19)
Pot 6	Canada (28); Slovakia (30); Italy (32)

Group 1–4 (five teams)
Pot 7	South Africa (45); Iran (49); Uzbekistan (52); Malaysia (58)

Group 4–6
Seeds	South Korea (4); Germany (5); Romania (6)
Pot 1	Chinese Taipei (7); Singapore (9); Egypt (11)
Pot 4	Thailand (20); India (21); Sweden (22)
Pot 5	Luxembourg (24); Portugal (25); Czech Republic (26)

== Group stage ==
All times are local (UTC+8).

=== Group 1 ===
Pos	Team	Pld	W	L	MF	MA	MD	Pts	Qualification
1	China	4	4	0	12	0	+12	8	Round of 16
2	Puerto Rico	4	3	1	9	7	+2	7	Round of 16
3	Malaysia	4	2	2	8	9	−1	6	
4	United States	4	1	3	7	9	−2	5	
5	Canada	4	0	4	1	12	−11	4	

Source: World Table Tennis

30 September 2022; 19:00	United States	3–0	Canada

	Individual matches
Sarah Jalli	3–1	Crystal Liu	7–11, 11–8, 12–10, 13–11
Lily Zhang	3–0	Ivy Liao	11–4, 11–8, 11–6
Tiffany Ke	3–0	Jiayi Nie	11–7, 12–10, 11–7

30 September 2022; 19:00	Puerto Rico	3–2	Malaysia

	Individual matches
Daniely Ríos	0–3	Karen Lyne	10–12, 5–11, 4–11
Adriana Díaz	3–0	Ho Ying	11–9, 11–5, 11–7
Melanie Díaz	0–3	Tee Ai Xin	6–11, 8–11, 13–15
Adriana Díaz	3–1	Karen Lyne	11–5, 12–10, 8–11, 11–6
Daniely Ríos	3–2	Ho Ying	9–11, 11–5, 10–12, 11–4, 11–6

1 October 2022; 19:00	China	3–0	Canada

	Individual matches
Chen Meng	3–0	Ivy Liao	11–2, 11–2, 11–5
Sun Yingsha	3–0	Crystal Liu	11–8, 11–4, 11–5
Wang Manyu	3–0	Jiayi Nie	11–3, 11–3, 11–4

1 October 2022; 19:00	United States	2–3	Malaysia

	Individual matches
Lily Zhang	3–0	Karen Lyne	11–9, 11–5, 11–4
Sarah Jalli	0–3	Chang Li Sian	5–11, 7–11, 8–11
Tiffany Ke	1–3	Tee Ai Xin	7–11, 10–12, 13–11, 5–11
Lily Zhang	3–2	Chang Li Sian	10–12, 11–5, 7–11, 11–5, 11–9
Sarah Jalli	0–3	Karen Lyne	3–11, 9–11, 8–11

2 October 2022; 16:00	China	3–0	Puerto Rico

	Individual matches
Wang Manyu	3–0	Adriana Díaz	12–10, 11–4, 11–5
Chen Meng	3–0	Daniely Ríos	12–10, 11–9, 11–4
Wang Yidi	3–0	Melanie Díaz	11–1, 11–2, 11–3

2 October 2022; 19:00	Canada	1–3	Malaysia

	Individual matches
Crystal Liu	3–2	Karen Lyne	11–4, 10–12, 5–11, 13–11, 11–8
Ivy Liao	1–3	Chang Li Sian Alice	9–11, 6–11, 11–9, 8–11
Jiayi Nie	0–3	Tee Ai Xin	5–11, 8–11, 4–11
Crystal Liu	1–3	Chang Li Sian Alice	4–11, 11–9, 9–11, 7–11

3 October 2022; 13:00	Puerto Rico	3–0	Canada

	Individual matches
Adriana Díaz	3–0	Crystal Liu	11–3, 11–7, 11–3
Daniely Ríos	3–0	Ivy Liao	11–3, 11–6, 11–4
Melanie Díaz	3–0	May Hui Tong	11–5, 11–4, 11–5

3 October 2022; 16:00	China	3–0	United States

	Individual matches
Sun Yingsha	3–0	Lily Zhang	14–12, 11–3, 11–8
Chen Xingtong	3–1	Sarah Jalli	9–11, 11–2, 11–5, 11–4
Chen Meng	3–0	Lin Yishiuan	11–6, 11–2, 11–5

4 October 2022; 13:00	United States	2–3	Puerto Rico

	Individual matches
Lily Zhang	3–0	Daniely Ríos	11–6, 11–8, 11–7
Sarah Lalli	0–3	Adriana Díaz	4–11, 4–11, 3–11
Tiffany Ke	0–3	Melanie Díaz	6–11, 10–12, 10–12
Lily Zhang	3–2	Adriana Díaz	7–11, 6–11, 11–8, 11–8, 11–4
Sarah Jalli	2–3	Daniely Ríos	5–11, 8–11, 11–9, 11–7, 9–11

4 October 2022; 19:00	China	3–0	Malaysia

	Individual matches
Sun Yingsha	3–0	Karen Lyne	11–8, 11–7, 11–6
Wang Manyu	3–0	Tee Ai Xin	11–5, 11–3, 11–8
Wang Yidi	3–0	Chang Li Sian Alice	11–6, 11–3, 11–0

=== Group 2 ===
Pos	Team	Pld	W	L	MF	MA	MD	Pts	Qualification
1	Japan	4	4	0	12	0	+12	8	Round of 16
2	Slovakia	4	3	1	9	6	+3	7	Round of 16
3	Hungary	4	2	2	7	7	0	6	Round of 16
4	Poland	4	1	3	5	11	−6	5	
5	Uzbekistan	4	0	4	3	12	−9	4	

Source: World Table Tennis

30 September 2022; 10:00	Japan	3–0	Slovakia

	Individual matches
Miyuu Kihara	3–1	Barbora Balážová	9–11, 11–8, 11–6, 11–6
Mima Ito	3–1	Ema Labošová	11–6, 11–8, 4–11, 12–10
Miyu Nagasaki	3–0	Tatiana Kukuľková	11–5, 11–3, 11–5

30 September 2022; 10:00	Hungary	3–1	Uzbekistan

	Individual matches
Dóra Madarász	3–1	Markhabo Magdieva	9–11, 13–11, 11–9, 11–8
Leonie Hartbrich	3–2	Sugdiyona Madaliev	11–8, 11–6, 6–11, 6–11, 11–2
Helga Dari	1–3	Rozalina Khadjieva	9–11, 7–11, 11–9, 7–11
Dóra Madarász	3–0	Sugdiyona Madaliev	11–4, 11–6, 11–5

1 October 2022; 13:00	Poland	3–2	Uzbekistan

	Individual matches
Anna Węgrzyn	3–2	Markhabo Magdieva	11–8, 11–9, 7–11, 12–14, 11–9
Katarzyna Węgrzyn	3–2	Asel Erkebaeva	11–3, 11–6, 10–12, 11–4
Paulina Krzysiek	1–3	Rozalina Khadjieva	9–11, 5–11, 11–7, 4–11
Katarzyna Węgrzyn	1–3	Markhabo Magdieva	8–11, 8–11, 12–10, 9–11
Anna Węgrzyn	3–0	Asel Erkebaeva	11–4, 11–7, 11–2

1 October 2022; 16:00	Hungary	1–3	Slovakia

	Individual matches
Dóra Madarász	3–0	Tatiana Kukuľková	12–10, 11–7, 11–6
Leonie Hartbrich	0–3	Barbora Balážová	6–11, 4–11, 9–11
Helga Dari	1–3	Ema Labošová	6–11, 8–11, 11–9, 3–11
Dóra Madarász	1–3	Barbora Balážová	7–11, 8–11, 11–7, 7–11

2 October 2022; 13:00	Slovakia	3–0	Uzbekistan

	Individual matches
Barbora Balážová	3–0	Rozalina Khadjieva	11–8, 11–8, 13–11
Tatiana Kukuľková	3–1	Markhabo Magdieva	11–3, 11–8, 5–11, 11–9
Ema Labošová	3–0	Sugdiyona Madaliev	11–8, 11–5, 11–2

2 October 2022; 19:00	Japan	3–0	Poland

	Individual matches
Mima Ito	3–0	Anna Węgrzyn	11–7, 11–7, 11–4
Hitomi Sato	3–0	Katarzyna Węgrzyn	11–9, 11–6, 11–9
Miyu Nagasaki	3–0	Paulina Krzysiek	11–5, 11–3, 11–4

3 October 2022; 19:00	Japan	3–0	Hungary

	Individual matches
Mima Ito	3–1	Helga Dari	10–12, 11–5, 11–5, 11–6
Hina Hayata	3–1	Dóra Madarász	5–11, 11–3, 11–5, 11–4
Hitomi Sato	3–0	Leonie Hartbrich	11–6, 11–4, 11–8

3 October 2022; 19:00	Poland	2–3	Slovakia

	Individual matches
Katarzyna Węgrzyn	3–1	Tatiana Kukuľková	11–7, 3–11, 13–11, 11–5
Paulina Krzysiek	0–3	Barbora Balážová	4–11, 3–11, 4–11
Anna Węgrzyn	3–2	Ema Labošová	11–9, 11–6, 9–11, 7–11, 11–8
Katarzyna Węgrzyn	2–3	Barbora Balážová	11–6, 6–11, 9–11, 11–2, 10–12
Paulina Krzysiek	0–3	Tatiana Kukuľková	9–11, 8–11, 10–12

4 October 2022; 19:00	Japan	3–0	Uzbekistan

	Individual matches
Miyuu Kihara	3–0	Markhabo Magdieva	11–5, 11–3, 11–5
Hina Hayata	3–0	Rozalina Khadjieva	11–7, 11–4, 11–4
Miyu Nagasaki	3–0	Asel Erkebaeva	11–2, 11–8, 11–5

4 October 2022; 19:00	Hungary	3–0	Poland

	Individual matches
Leonie Hartbrich	3–2	Katarzyna Węgrzyn	1–11, 5–11, 11–7, 11–8, 12–10
Dóra Madarász	3–2	Anna Węgrzyn	7–11, 11–1, 11–4, 13–15, 11–9
Helga Dari	3–1	Paulina Krzysiek	13–11, 13–15, 12–10, 13–11

=== Group 3 ===
Pos	Team	Pld	W	L	MF	MA	MD	Pts	Qualification
1	Hong Kong	4	4	0	12	2	+10	8	Round of 16
2	France	4	3	1	11	5	+6	7	Round of 16
3	Italy	4	2	2	6	7	−1	6	
4	Brazil	4	1	3	6	9	−3	5	
5	South Africa	4	0	4	0	12	−12	4	

Source: World Table Tennis

30 September 2022; 10:00	Brazil	3–0	South Africa

	Individual matches
Bruna Takahashi	3–0	Musfiquh Kalam	11–4, 11–2, 11–5
Giulia Takahashi	3–0	Danisha Patel	11–3, 11–4, 11–7
Laura Watanabe	3–0	Lailaa Edwards	11–4, 11–5, 11–1

30 September 2022; 10:00	Hong Kong	3–0	Italy

	Individual matches
Doo Hoi Kem	3–0	Debora Vivarelli	11–5, 12–10, 11–5
Zhu Chengzhu	3–1	Giorgia Piccolin	11–8, 7–11, 11–5, 11–1
Lee Ho Ching	3–0	Nicole Arlia	11–6, 11–7, 12–10

1 October 2022; 10:00	France	3–0	South Africa

	Individual matches
Prithika Pavade	3–0	Danisha Patel	11–6, 11–6, 11–5
Jia Nan Yuan	3–0	Musfiquh Kalam	11–0, 11–4, 11–0
Charlotte Lutz	3–0	Zodwa Maphanga	11–5, 11–2, 11–9

1 October 2022; 10:00	Brazil	1–3	Italy

	Individual matches
Laura Watanabe	0–3	Giorgia Piccolin	8–11, 8–11, 5–11
Bruna Takahashi	3–1	Nicole Arlia	11–5, 11–7, 8–11, 11–4
Giulia Takahashi	1–3	Debora Vivarelli	8–11, 6–11, 12–10, 6–11
Bruna Takahashi	1–3	Giorgia Piccolin	5–11, 9–11, 11–8, 9–11

2 October 2022; 10:00	Hong Kong	3–2	France

	Individual matches
Doo Hoi Kem	3–1	Prithika Pavade	6–11, 11–7, 11–6, 11–8
Chengzhu Zhu	3–1	Jia Nan Yuan	11–7, 11–4, 9–11, 11–9
Lee Ho Ching	0–3	Pauline Chasselin	7–11, 9–11, 9–11
Doo Hoi Kem	1–3	Jia Nan Yuan	9–11, 11–3, 12–14, 9–11
Chengzhu Zhu	3–1	Prithika Pavade	11–6, 12–10, 8–11, 11–6

2 October 2022; 13:00	Italy	3–0	South Africa

	Individual matches
Nicole Arlia	3–0	Danisha Patel	11–4, 11–5, 11–7
Giorgia Piccolin	3–0	Lailaa Edwards	11–2, 11–3, 11–4
Debora Vivarelli	3–1	Zodwa Maphanga	11–7, 11–2, 8–11, 11–1

3 October 2022; 10:00	Hong Kong	3–0	Brazil

	Individual matches
Doo Hoi Kem	3–0	Giulia Takahashi	11–7, 11–4, 12–10
Zhu Chengzhu	3–0	Bruna Takahashi	11–7, 11–7, 18–16
Minnie Soo	3–0	Laura Watanabe	11–6, 11–5, 11–8

3 October 2022; 13:00	France	3–0	Italy

	Individual matches
Prithika Pavade	3–1	Giorgia Piccolin	11–7, 11–6, 7–11, 11–5
Jia Nan Yuan	3–1	Nicole Arlia	11–7, 11–7, 7–11, 11–9
Pauline Chasselin	3–0	Debora Vivarelli	12–10, 13–11, 13–11

4 October 2022; 10:00	Brazil	2–3	France

	Individual matches
Bruna Takahashi	3–0	Pauline Chasselin	13–11, 11–6, 11–6
Giulia Takahashi	0–3	Prithika Pavade	5–11, 7–11, 7–11
Laura Watanabe	3–1	Charlotte Lutz	12–10, 11–4, 5–11, 12–10
Bruna Takahashi	1–3	Prithika Pavade	8–11, 12–14, 11–9, 9–11
Giulia Takahashi	0–3	Pauline Chasselin	9–11, 6–11, 8–11

4 October 2022; 10:00	Hong Kong	3–0	South Africa

	Individual matches
Minnie Soo	3–0	Zodwa Maphanga	11–3, 11–7, 11–4
Wing Lam Ng	3–0	Musfiquh Kalam	11–5, 11–3, 11–7
Lee Ho Ching	3–0	Lailaa Edwards	12–10, 11–5, 11–2

=== Group 4 ===
Pos	Team	Pld	W	L	MF	MA	MD	Pts	Qualification
1	Singapore	4	3	1	10	4	+6	7	Round of 16
2	Luxembourg	4	3	1	9	5	+4	7	Round of 16
3	South Korea	4	2	2	8	7	+1	6	Round of 16
4	Thailand	4	2	2	8	7	+1	6	
5	Iran	4	0	4	0	12	−12	4	

Source: World Table Tennis

30 September 2022; 16:00	Singapore	3–0	Iran

	Individual matches
Wong Xin Ru	3–0	Neda Shahsavari	11–8, 11–7, 11–4
Zeng Jian	3–0	Mahshid Ashtari	11–9, 11–9, 11–2
Zhou Jingyi	3–0	Parinaz Hajilou	11–7, 11–9, 13–11

30 September 2022; 16:00	South Korea	1–3	Luxembourg

	Individual matches
Lee Zi-on	3–0	Sarah De Nutte	11–9, 11–4, 11–9
Jeon Ji-hee	1–3	Ni Xialian	4–11, 11–8, 6–11, 9–11
Kim Ha-yeong	1–3	Tessy Gonderinger	10–12, 9–11, 11–2, 9–11
Lee Zi-on	2–3	Ni Xialian	3–11, 12–10, 9–11, 11–7, 4–11

1 October 2022; 19:00	Singapore	3–0	Luxembourg

	Individual matches
Zeng Jian	3–1	Sarah De Nutte	11–2, 6–11, 11–3, 11–9
Zhou Jingyi	3–2	Ni Xialian	4–11, 6–11, 11–5, 11–8, 14–12
Wong Xin Ru	3–0	Tessy Gonderinger	11–8, 11–7, 11–5

1 October 2022; 19:00	Thailand	3–0	Iran

	Individual matches
Orawan Paranang	3–0	Mahshid Ashtari	12–10, 11–2, 119
Jinnipa Sawettabut	3–2	Neda Shahsavari	11–8, 11–13, 11–5, 6–11, 11–8
Wanwisa Aueawiriyayothin	3–1	Parinaz Hajilou	11–5, 16–14, 6–11, 11–6

2 October 2022; 13:00	South Korea	3–1	Thailand

	Individual matches
Yoon Hyo-bin	0–3	Orawan Paranang	7–11, 8–11, 4–11
Lee Zi-on	3–2	Jinnipa Sawettabut	11–7, 8–11, 11–5, 13–15, 15–13
Kim Na-yeong	3–1	Wanwisa Aueawiriyayothin	13–15, 11–6, 11–5, 11–9
Lee Zi-on	3–2	Orawan Paranang	11–4, 4–11, 7–11, 11–6, 11–9

2 October 2022; 13:00	Luxembourg	3–0	Iran

	Individual matches
Ni Xialian	3–1	Elina Rahimi	11–9, 6–11, 11–5, 11–6
Sarah De Nutte	3–1	Neda Shahsavari	11–9, 11–6, 6–11, 15–13
Tessy Gonderinger	3–2	Shima Safaei	16–14, 8–11, 10–12, 11–9, 11–6

3 October 2022; 10:00	South Korea	1–3	Singapore

	Individual matches
Lee Zi-on	2–3	Zhou Jingyi	11–5, 9–11, 11–8, 8–11, 10–12
Kim Na-yeong	1–3	Zeng Jian	9–11, 11–9, 9–11, 9–11
Yoon Hyo-bin	3–0	Goi Rui Xuan	11–6, 11–7, 11–9
Lee Zi-on	0–3	Zeng Jian	5–11, 3–11, 10–12

3 October 2022; 19:00	Thailand	1–3	Luxembourg

	Individual matches
Orawan Paranang	0–3	Sarah De Nutte	7–11, 9–11, 7–11
Jinnipa Sawettabut	1–3	Ni Xialian	3–11, 6–11, 12–10, 10–12
Wanwisa Aueawiriyayothin	3–1	Tessy Gonderinger	9–11, 11–9, 11–7, 11–6
Orawan Paranang	2–3	Ni Xialian	5–11, 11–6, 11–13, 11–8, 6–11

4 October 2022; 16:00	Singapore	1–3	Thailand

	Individual matches
Wong Xin Ru	0–3	Orawan Paranang	9–11, 3–11, 7–11
Zhou Jingyi	3–0	Jinnipa Sawettabut	11–9, 12–10, 11–6
Wanling Zhang	0–3	Wanwisa Aueawiriyayothin	4–11, 5–11, 3–11
Zhou Jingyi	0–3	Orawan Paranang	20–22, 8–11, 5–11

4 October 2022; 16:00	South Korea	3–0	Iran

	Individual matches
Kim Na-yeong	3–0	Shima Safaei	11–3, 11–6, 11–3
Lee Zi-on	3–2	Parinaz Hajilou	11–2, 11–13, 10–12, 11–9, 11–7
Yoon Hyo-bin	3–0	Elina Rahimi	11–9, 11–9, 11–6

=== Group 5 ===
Pos	Team	Pld	W	L	MF	MA	MD	Pts	Qualification
1	Germany	3	3	0	9	2	+7	6	Round of 16
2	India	3	2	1	8	4	+4	5	Round of 16
3	Czech Republic	3	1	2	3	7	−4	4	Round of 16
4	Egypt	3	0	3	2	9	−7	3	

Source: World Table Tennis

1 October 2022; 13:00	Germany	3–2	India

	Individual matches
Han Ying	3–0	Manika Batra	11–3, 11–1, 11–2
Nina Mittelham	0–3	Sreeja Akula	9–11, 10–12, 7–11
Sabine Winter	1–3	Diya Parag Chitale	9–11, 8–11, 11–6, 11–13
Nina Mittelham	3–1	Manika Batra	7–11, 11–6, 11–7, 11–8
Han Ying	3–0	Sreeja Akula	11–3, 11–5, 11–4

1 October 2022; 13:00	Egypt	1–3	Czech Republic

	Individual matches
Dina Meshref	3–1	Markéta Ševčíková	8–11, 11–6, 12–10, 11–5
Hana Goda	0–3	Hana Matelová	8–11, 5–11, 9–11
Yousra Abdel Razek	2–3	Kateřina Tomanovská	8–11, 11–9, 11–8, 9–11, 6–11
Dina Meshref	1–3	Hana Matelová	11–8, 7–11, 6–11, 12–14

2 October 2022; 10:00	Germany	3–0	Egypt

	Individual matches
Han Ying	3–0	Dina Meshref	11–5, 11–3, 11–6
Shan Xiaona	3–0	Hana Goda	11–4, 11–9, 11–4
Nina Mittelham	3–0	Mariam Alhodaby	14–12, 13–11, 11–3

2 October 2022; 16:00	India	3–0	Czech Republic

	Individual matches
Manika Batra	3–1	Hana Matelová	11–6, 11–6, 8–11, 12–10
Sreeja Akula	3–0	Markéta Ševčíková	11–5, 11–3, 11–8
Diya Parag Chitale	3–1	Kateřina Tomanovská	11–13, 15–13, 12–10, 14–12

3 October 2022; 13:00	Germany	3–0	Czech Republic

	Individual matches
Han Ying	3–0	Kateřina Tomanovská	11–4, 11–5, 11–7
Nina Mittelham	3–1	Hana Matelová	8–11, 11–7, 11–9, 11–6
Shan Xiaona	3–0	Markéta Ševčíková	11–8, 11–4, 11–5

3 October 2022; 13:00	Egypt	1–3	India

	Individual matches
Hana Goda	0–3	Sreeja Akula	6–11, 4–11, 1–11
Dina Meshref	2–3	Manika Batra	11–8, 6–11, 7–11, 11–1, 8–11
Yousra Abdel Razek	3–2	Diya Parag Chitale	5–11, 12–10, 9–11, 11–1, 11–4
Dina Meshref	1–3	Sreeja Akula	8–11, 8–11, 11–9, 6–11

=== Group 6 ===
Pos	Team	Pld	W	L	MF	MA	MD	Pts	Qualification
1	Chinese Taipei	3	2	1	8	4	+4	5	Round of 16
2	Portugal	3	2	1	6	7	−1	5	Round of 16
3	Romania	3	1	2	6	8	−2	4	Round of 16
4	Sweden	3	1	2	7	8	−1	4	

Source: World Table Tennis

30 September 2022; 13:00	Chinese Taipei	3–0	Portugal

	Individual matches
Chen Szu-yu	3–1	Shao Jieni	11–7, 5–11, 16–14, 13–11
Cheng I-ching	3–2	Fu Yu	5–11, 11–4, 9–11, 11–7, 11–5
Liu Hsing-yin	3–0	Inês Matos	11–8, 11–7, 11–7

30 September 2022; 16:00	Romania	3–2	Sweden

	Individual matches
Bernadette Szőcs	3–0	Matilda Hansson	11–3, 11–4, 11–8
Elizabeta Samara	2–3	Linda Bergström	8–11, 8–11, 11–6, 16–14, 9–11
Adina Diaconu	3–0	Filippa Bergand	11–3, 11–3, 11–4
Bernadette Szőcs	2–3	Linda Bergstrom	7–11, 11–7, 12–14, 11–7, 2–11
Elizabeta Samara	3–2	Matilda Hansson	11–3, 7–11, 10–12, 11–8, 11–8

1 October 2022; 10:00	Sweden	2–3	Portugal

	Individual matches
Linda Bergström	3–0	Shao Jieni	11–6, 11–6, 11–6
Matilda Hansson	0–3	Fu Yu	3–11, 5–11, 4–11
Filippa Bergand	3–1	Inês Matos	11–9, 9–11, 11–4, 11–9
Linda Bergström	2–3	Fu Yu	11–7, 7–11, 8–11, 13–11, 9–11
Matilda Hansson	0–3	Shao Jieni	3–11, 6–11, 7–11

1 October 2022; 10:00	Romania	1–3	Chinese Taipei

	Individual matches
Elizabeta Samara	2–3	Chen Szu-yu	2–11, 5–11, 13–11, 11–8, 6–11
Bernadette Szőcs	3–0	Cheng I-ching	11–6, 11–6, 11–8
Adina Diaconu	0–3	Li Yu-Jhun	9–11, 8–11, 6–11
Bernadette Szőcs	2–3	Chen Szu-yu	12–14, 11–7, 6–11, 11–8, 6–11

3 October 2022; 16:00	Romania	2–3	Portugal

	Individual matches
Elizabeta Samara	2–3	Shao Jieni	13–11, 6–11, 4–11, 11–9, 11–13
Bernadette Szőcs	1–3	Fu Yu	7–11, 7–11, 13–11, 6–11
Adina Diaconu	3–0	Inês Matos	11–6, 11–9, 11–7
Bernadette Szőcs	3–2	Shao Jieni	6–11, 12–10, 7–11, 11–8, 11–5
Elizabeta Samara	1–3	Fu Yu	12–10, 4–11, 7–11, 7–11

3 October 2022; 16:00	Chinese Taipei	2–3	Sweden

	Individual matches
Li Yu-Jhun	2–3	Linda Bergström	8–11, 13–15, 11–4, 11–9, 4–11
Liu Hsing-yin	3–0	Rebecca Muskantor	11–4, 11–6, 11–8
Huang Yi-hua	2–3	Filippa Bergand	11–6, 7–11, 9–11, 11–6, 13–15
Li Yu-Jhun	3–2	Rebecca Muskantor	12–14, 11–6, 10–12, 11–5, 11–4
Liu Hsing-yin	2–3	Linda Bergström	9–11, 11–6, 11–7, 2–11, 10–12

== Knockout stage ==
Round of 16
China	3
Hungary	0
Portugal	3
Luxembourg	1
Chinese Taipei	3
India	0
Czech Republic	1
Singapore	3
Hong Kong	3
Romania	2
Puerto Rico	1
Germany	3
Slovakia	3
France	1
South Korea	0
Japan	3

Quarter-finals
China	3
Portugal	0
Chinese Taipei	3
Singapore	2
Hong Kong	2
Germany	3
Slovakia	0
Japan	3

Semi-finals
China	3
Chinese Taipei	0
Germany	0
Japan	3

Final
China	3
Japan	0

=== Round of 16 ===
5 October 2022; 11:00	Czech Republic	1–3	Singapore

	Individual matches
Hana Matelová	3–1	Zhou Jingyi	11–8, 9–11, 11–6, 11–9
Kateřina Tomanovská	0–3	Zeng Jian	10–12, 9–11, 9–11
Markéta Ševčíková	0–3	Wong Xin Ru	7–11, 12–14, 7–11
Hana Matelová	0–3	Zeng Jian	6–11, 4–11, 7–11

5 October 2022; 11:00	Puerto Rico	1–3	Germany

	Individual matches
Adriana Díaz	3–2	Nina Mittelham	11–6, 7–11, 11–7, 8–11, 11–4
Melanie Díaz	0–3	Han Ying	2–11, 3–11, 6–11
Daniely Ríos	1–3	Shan Xiaona	8–11, 12–10, 6–11, 3–11
Adriana Díaz	0–3	Han Ying	1–11, 1–11, 5–11

5 October 2022; 15:00	Hong Kong	3–2	Romania

	Individual matches
Zhu Chengzhu	3–2	Bernadette Szőcs	12–10, 5–11, 16–18, 11–3, 12–10
Doo Hoi Kem	3–1	Elizabeta Samara	11–9, 11–7, 8–11, 11–6
Lee Ho Ching	1–3	Adina Diaconu	8–11, 14–12, 6–11, 13–15
Doo Hoi Kem	1–3	Bernadette Szőcs	5–11, 9–11, 11–5, 6–11
Zhu Chengzhu	3–2	Elizabeta Samara	6–11, 13–11, 4–11, 11–7, 11–9

5 October 2022; 15:00	Chinese Taipei	3–0	India

	Individual matches
Chen Szu-yu	3–0	Manika Batra	11–7, 11–9, 11–3
Cheng I-ching	3–1	Sreeja Akula	11–8, 5–11, 11–6, 11–9
Liu Hsing-yin	3–2	Diya Parag Chitale	11–6, 9–11, 9–11, 11–8, 11–7

5 October 2022; 15:00	Slovakia	3–1	France

	Individual matches
Barbora Balážová	2–3	Prithika Pavade	11–7, 10–12, 11–8, 8–11, 9–11
Ema Labošová	3–1	Jia Nan Yuan	9–11, 11–9, 12–10, 11–9
Tatiana Kukuľková	3–2	Pauline Chasselin	4–11, 12–10, 6–11, 11–7, 11–3
Barbora Balážová	3–1	Jia Nan Yuan	11–9, 11–8, 10–12, 12–10

5 October 2022; 19:30	China	3–0	Hungary

	Individual matches
Sun Yingsha	3–0	Leonie Hartbrich	11–4, 11–2, 11–2
Chen Meng	3–0	Dóra Madarász	11–4, 11–4, 11–3
Wang Manyu	3–0	Helga Dari	11–3, 11–2, 11–8

5 October 2022; 19:30	South Korea	0–3	Japan

	Individual matches
Kim Na-yeong	1–3	Mima Ito	11–5, 7–11, 7–11, 8–11
Lee Zi-on	0–3	Miyuu Kihara	8–11, 10–12, 10–12
Yoon Hyo-bin	1–3	Miyu Nagasaki	11–6, 9–11, 6–11, 8–11

5 October 2022; 19:30	Portugal	3–1	Luxembourg

	Individual matches
Fu Yu	3–1	Ni Xialian	15–13, 7–11, 11–3, 11–4
Shao Jieni	3–1	Sarah De Nutte	11–3, 11–5, 7–11, 11–6
Inês Matos	2–3	Tessy Gonderinger	11–9, 9–11, 8–11, 11–8, 7–11
Shao Jieni	3–2	Ni Xialian	11–9, 8–11, 12–14, 11–3, 11–6

=== Quarterfinals ===
6 October 2022; 11:00	Chinese Taipei	3–2	Singapore

	Individual matches
Chen Szu-yu	3–0	Zhou Jingyi	11–9, 11–4, 11–7
Cheng I-ching	1–3	Zeng Jian	8–11, 10–12, 11–9, 8–11
LI Yu-Jhun	3–2	Wong Xin Ru	9–11, 9–11, 13–11, 11–7, 11–2
Chen Szu-yu	1–3	Zeng Jian	4–11, 11–9, 13–15, 5–11
Cheng I-ching	3–0	Zhou Jingyi	11–8, 11–2, 11–3

6 October 2022; 11:00	Hong Kong	2–3	Germany

	Individual matches
Minnie Soo	3–1	Han Ying	7–11, 11–1, 11–9, 16–14
Zhu Chengzhu	3–1	Nina Mittelham	11–3, 11–5, 13–15, 11–5
Lee Ho Ching	1–3	Shan Xiaona	11–13, 11–5, 10–12, 14–16
Zhu Chengzhu	0–3	Han Ying	6–11, 3–11, 8–11
Minnie Soo	1–3	Nina Mittelham	11–9, 11–13, 5–11, 5–11

6 October 2022; 19:30	China	3–0	Portugal

	Individual matches
Wang Manyu	3–0	Shao Jieni	11–6, 11–6, 11–5
Chen Meng	3–0	Fu Yu	11–4, 11–2, 11–5
Sun Yingsha	3–0	Inês Matos	11–4, 11–1, 11–3

6 October 2022; 19:30	Slovakia	0–3	Japan

	Individual matches
Ema Labošová	0–3	Mima Ito	9–11, 1–11, 3–11
Barbora Balážová	1–3	Hina Hayata	9–11, 7–11, 11–9, 6–11
Tatiana Kukuľková	1–3	Miyu Nagasaki	11–6, 5–11, 11–13, 7–11

=== Semifinals ===
7 October 2022; 15:00	China	3–0	Chinese Taipei

	Individual matches
Sun Yingsha	3–0	Chen Szu-yu	11–9, 11–1, 11–4
Chen Meng	3–0	Li Yu-Jhun	12–10, 11–8, 11–6
Wang Manyu	3–0	Liu Hsing-yin	11–3, 11–5, 11–9

7 October 2022; 19:30	Germany	0–3	Japan

	Individual matches
Nina Mittelham	2–3	Hina Hayata	11–9, 3–11, 11–6, 6–11, 8–11
Han Ying	0–3	Mima Ito	7–11, 7–11, 6–11
Shan Xiaona	2–3	Miyuu Kihara	4–11, 8–11, 11–9, 12–10, 10–12

=== Final ===
8 October 2022; 19:30	China	3–0	Japan

	Individual matches
Chen Meng	3–0	Miyuu Kihara	11–6, 11–8, 11–8
Wang Manyu	3–1	Mima Ito	11–9, 9–11, 12–10, 11–5
Sun Yingsha	3–0	Miyu Nagasaki	11–7, 11–7, 11–8
