= 2026 European Table Tennis Championships =

- Date: 11–18 October 2026
- Edition: 45th
- Location: Ljubljana, Slovenia
- Venue: Arena Stožice

Champions

Men's singles
- (France) Félix Lebrun

Women's singles
- (Individual Neutral Athletes) Elizabet Abraamian

Men's doubles
- (France) Félix Lebrun (France) Alexis Lebrun

Women's doubles
- (Slovakia) Tatiana Kukulkova (Poland) Natalia Bajor

Mixed doubles
- (Germany) Benedikt Duda (Germany) Nina Mittelham
- European Table Tennis Championships

The 2026 European Table Tennis Championships is a table tennis tournament being held at the Arena Stožice in Ljubljana, Slovenia, from 11 to 18 October 2026.

== Background and player participation ==
This tournament marks the first time that athletes holding Russian and Belarusian passports have been permitted to participate in the European Table Tennis Championships since the 2021 edition in Cluj-Napoca, following a continental ban implemented in early 2022 due to the Russian invasion of Ukraine.

Although the ETTU's revised policy fundamentally allows the restoration of full national identities, the framework remains subject to host-country requirements and local legislation. Because the Slovenian government enforces active national sanctions regarding state symbols of Russia and Belarus, athletes from these nations are restricted from using their national flags, emblems, or uniforms during the competition in Ljubljana. Furthermore, the tournament organizers confirmed that if an athlete under these codes wins a gold medal, no national anthem will be played during the medal ceremony.

== Medalists ==
Event	Gold	Silver	Bronze
Men's singles	(France) Félix Lebrun	(Sweden) Anton Källberg	(France) Léo de Nodrest
Men's singles	(France) Félix Lebrun	(Sweden) Anton Källberg	(Germany) Dang Qiu
Women's singles	(Individual Neutral Athletes) Elizabet Abraamian	(Germany) Annett Kaufmann	(France) Prithika Pavade
Women's singles	(Individual Neutral Athletes) Elizabet Abraamian	(Germany) Annett Kaufmann	(Germany) Nina Mittelham
Men's doubles	(France) Félix Lebrun (France) Alexis Lebrun	(Sweden) Kristian Karlsson (Sweden) Anton Källberg	(France) Esteban Dorr (France) Florian Bourrassaud
Men's doubles	(France) Félix Lebrun (France) Alexis Lebrun	(Sweden) Kristian Karlsson (Sweden) Anton Källberg	(Moldova) Vladislav Ursu (Moldova) Andrei Puțuntică
Women's doubles	(Slovakia) Tatiana Kukulkova (Poland) Natalia Bajor	(Poland) Zuzanna Wielgos (Poland) Anna Brzyska	(Romania) Bernadette Szőcs (Romania) Elizabeta Samara
Women's doubles	(Slovakia) Tatiana Kukulkova (Poland) Natalia Bajor	(Poland) Zuzanna Wielgos (Poland) Anna Brzyska	(Germany) Nina Mittelham (Germany) Annett Kaufmann
Mixed doubles	(Germany) Benedikt Duda (Germany) Nina Mittelham	(France) Alexis Lebrun (France) Charlotte Lutz	(Romania) Eduard Ionescu (Romania) Bernadette Szőcs
Mixed doubles	(Germany) Benedikt Duda (Germany) Nina Mittelham	(France) Alexis Lebrun (France) Charlotte Lutz	(Sweden) Kristian Karlsson (Sweden) Christina Källberg

== Medal table ==
* Host nation (Slovenia)

Rank	nation	Gold	Silver	Bronze	Total
1	France (FRA)	2	1	3	6
2	Germany (GER)	1	1	3	5
3	Individual Neutral Athletes (AIN)	1	0	0	1
4	Poland (POL)	0.5	1	0	1.5
5	Slovakia (SVK)	0.5	0	0	0.5
6	Sweden (SWE)	0	2	1	3
7	Romania (ROU)	0	0	2	2
8	Moldova (MDA)	0	0	1	1
Totals (8 entries)		5	5	10	20
