= Elizabet Abraamian =

Russian table tennis player

Personal information
- Born: 29 April 2003 (age 23) Yerevan, Armenia

Sport
- Sport: Table tennis
Medal record
Women's table tennis
Representing AIN
Gold medal – first place	2026 Ljubljana	Singles

Elizabet Aramovna Abraamian (Russian: Элизабет Арамовна Абраамян; born 29 April 2003) is a Russian table tennis player.

== Early life ==
Elizabet Abraamian was born in Yerevan, Armenia.

== Career ==
=== 2026 ===
She won the women's singles at the 2026 European Table Tennis Championships, held in Ljubljana, Slovenia, from 11 to 18 October, becoming the first to win a European singles title as a qualifier. She is also the first Russian to win a European (men's or women's) singles title.
