= Annett Kaufmann =

German table tennis player

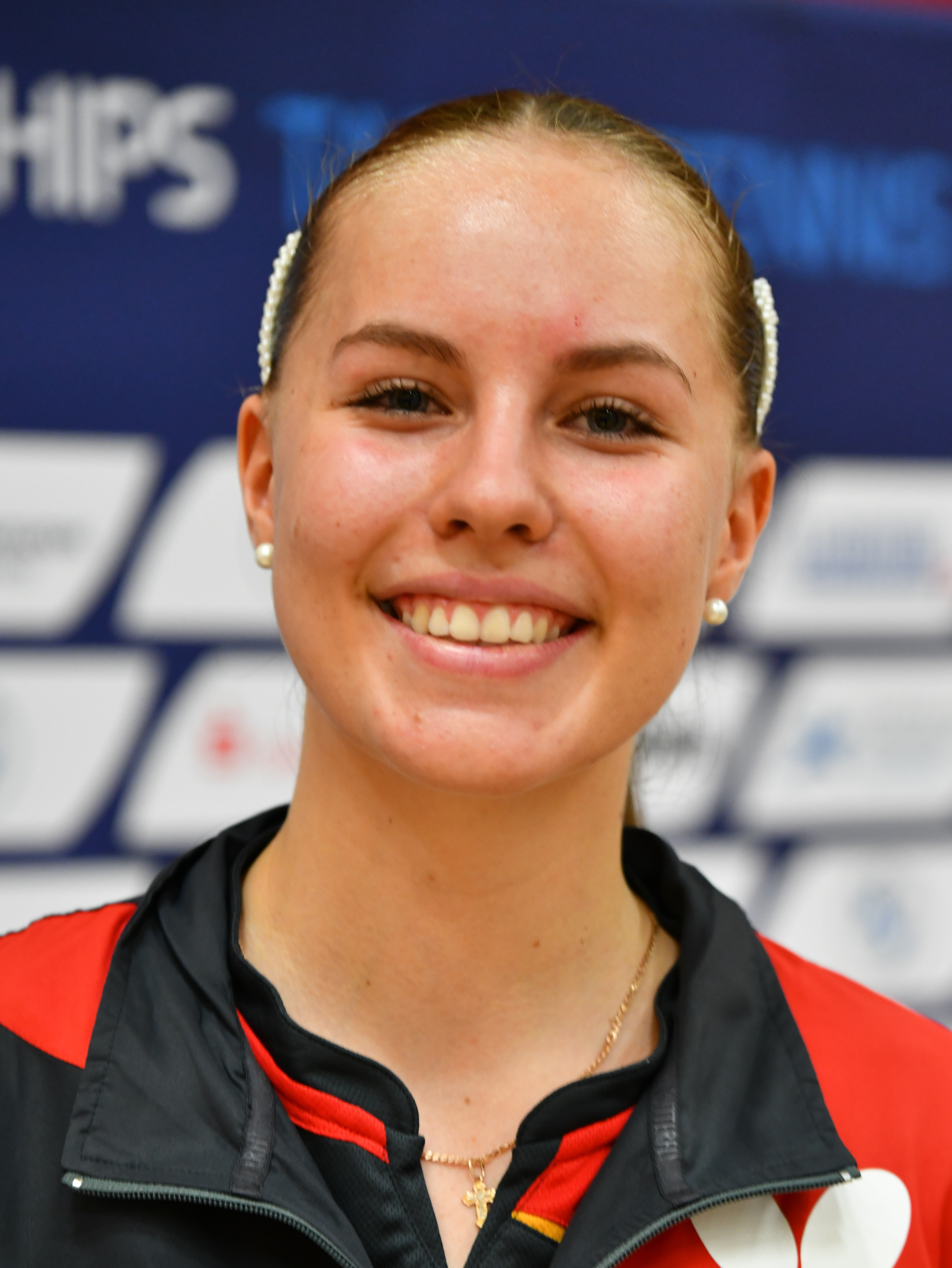
- Kaufmann in 2022

Personal information
- Born: 23 June 2006 (age 20) Wolfsburg, Germany
- Height: 183 cm (6 ft 0 in)

Sport
- Sport: Table tennis
- Highest ranking: 42 (28 September 2026)
- Current ranking: 42 (28 September 2026)
Medal record
Women's table tennis
Representing Germany
World Championships
Bronze medal – third place	2022 Chengdu	Team
Bronze medal – third place	2026 London	Team
World Cup
Bronze medal – third place	2025 Chengdu	Mixed team
European Championships
Gold medal – first place	2021 Cluj-Napoca	Team
Gold medal – first place	2023 Malmö	Team
Gold medal – first place	2025 Zadar	Team
Bronze medal – third place	2024 Linz	Mixed doubles
Bronze medal – third place	2026 Ljubljana	Doubles
Silver medal – second place	2026 Ljubljana	Singles

Annett Kaufmann (born 23 June 2006) is a German table tennis player. She won the European Championships several times win the team and won a silver medal in the singles in 2026. She was a member of the German table tennis team at the 2024 Summer Olympics in Paris.

== Early life and career ==
Kaufmann's parents are the ice hockey player Andrej Kaufmann and the downhill racer Anna Kaufmann, both originally from Kazakhstan. Kaufmann started playing table tennis with the age of four and a half years. Deespite being right handed she plays with her left hand. Her first club was the TTC Bietigheim-Bissingen, which she left in 2019 to join the SV Böblingen. After having played for it for five seasons the club withdrew from the Bundesliga (highest national league) and Kaufmann subsequently joined the SV-DJK Kolbermoor.

In 2024, she became the first European player to win the U-19 girls' singles title at the ITTF World Youth Championships.
