= Sabine Winter =

German table tennis player (born 1992)

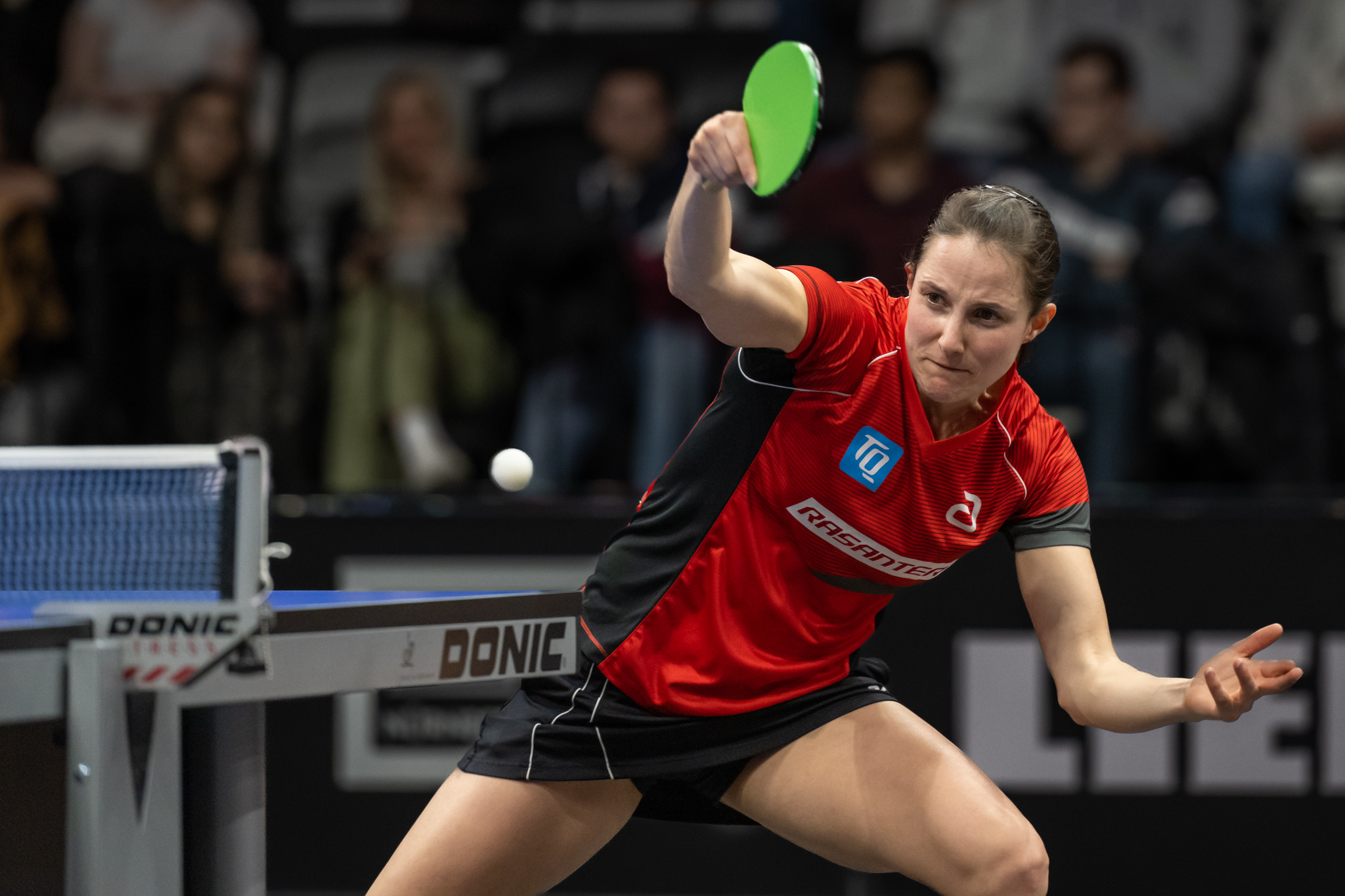
- Winter in 2023

Personal information
- Full name: Sabine Jane Winter
- Born: 27 September 1992 (age 34) Bad Soden, Germany
- Height: 1.68 m (5 ft 6 in)

Sport
- Sport: Table tennis
- Highest ranking: 9 (2 April 2026)
- Current ranking: 9 (28 September 2026)
Medal record
Women's table tennis
Representing Germany
World Championships
| Bronze medal – third place | 2010 Moscow | Team |
| Bronze medal – third place | 2022 Chengdu | Team |
| Bronze medal – third place | 2026 London | Team |
World Cup
| Bronze medal – third place | 2025 Chengdu | Mixed team |
| Bronze medal – third place | 2026 Macau | Singles |
European Games
| Silver medal – second place | 2023 Kraków–Małopolska | Team |
European Championships
| Gold medal – first place | 2013 Schwechat | Doubles |
| Gold medal – first place | 2014 Lisbon | Team |
| Gold medal – first place | 2015 Yekaterinburg | Team |
| Gold medal – first place | 2016 Budapest | Doubles |
| Gold medal – first place | 2021 Cluj-Napoca | Team |
| Gold medal – first place | 2023 Malmö | Team |
| Gold medal – first place | 2025 Zadar | Team |
| Silver medal – second place | 2017 Luxembourg City | Team |
| Silver medal – second place | 2020 Warsaw | Doubles |
| Bronze medal – third place | 2022 Munich | Singles |
Europe Top-16
| Bronze medal – third place | 2017 Antibes | Singles |
| Bronze medal – third place | 2025 Montreux | Singles |
| Gold medal – first place | 2026 Montreux | Singles |

Sabine Jane Winter (born 27 September 1992) is a German table tennis player. She won singles title at the 2013 ITTF World Tour, Belarus Open. Winter won bronze in singles at the 2017 Europe Top-16 and the 2022 European Table Tennis Championships. She is also a two-time doubles champion at the European Championships.

In April 2026, she reached a career-high singles ranking of world No. 9 by ITTF/WTT, currently the best-ranked non-Asian player in women's singles.

== Youth ==
Winter began playing table tennis with TSV Oberalting, which is a club in the German state of Bavaria. After playing for SC Wörthsee, the right-handed player joined TSV Schwabhausen in 2004. In the junior and youth categories, she achieved many national and international successes. In 2005, 2006, and 2008, she won ranking tournaments for young girls. In 2007, she became German junior champion in mixed doubles and European Champion in women's doubles together with Barbora Balážová of Slovakia. The following year, she won the German junior championship in women's doubles with Kathrin Mühlbach. In 2010, she won the European girls' ranking tournament Europe Youth Top 10.
