= Linda Bergström =

Swedish table tennis player (born 1995)

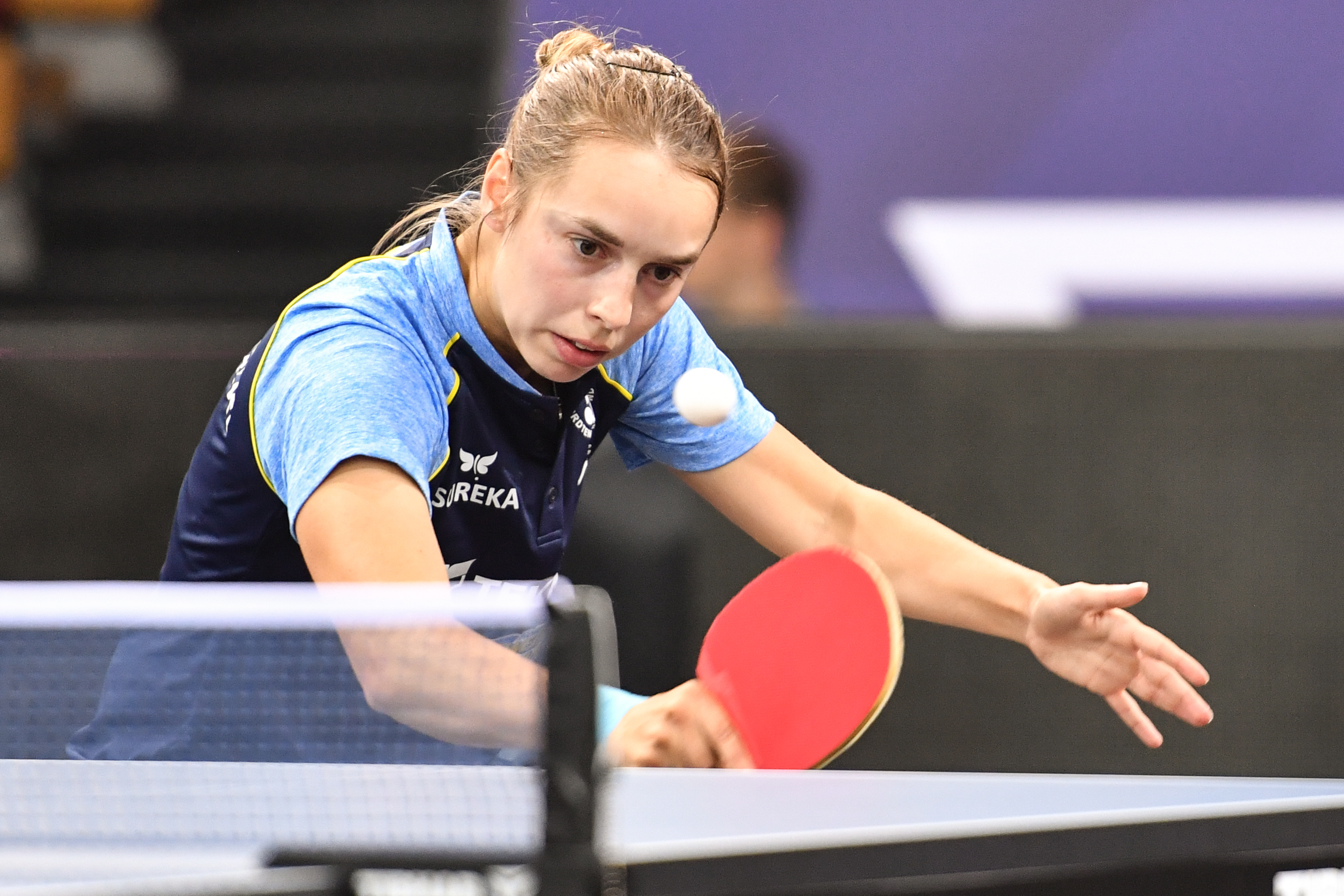
- Bergström at 2022 European Championships

Personal information
- Full name: Linda Amanda Bergström
- Born: 12 January 1995 (age 31) Stockholm, Sweden
- Height: 1.62 m (5 ft 4 in)

Sport
- Sport: Table tennis
- Club: fr:TT Saint-Quentin (Pro A)
- Playing style: Right-handed, shakehand grip, defender
- Highest ranking: 27 (7 May 2024)
- Current ranking: 74 (28 September 2026)
Medal record
Women's table tennis
Representing Sweden
European Championships
Bronze medal – third place	2014 Lisbon	Team

Linda Amanda Bergström (born 12 January 1995) is a Swedish table tennis player. She competed in the 2020 Summer Olympics.
