= Izabela Lupulesku =

Serbian table tennis player

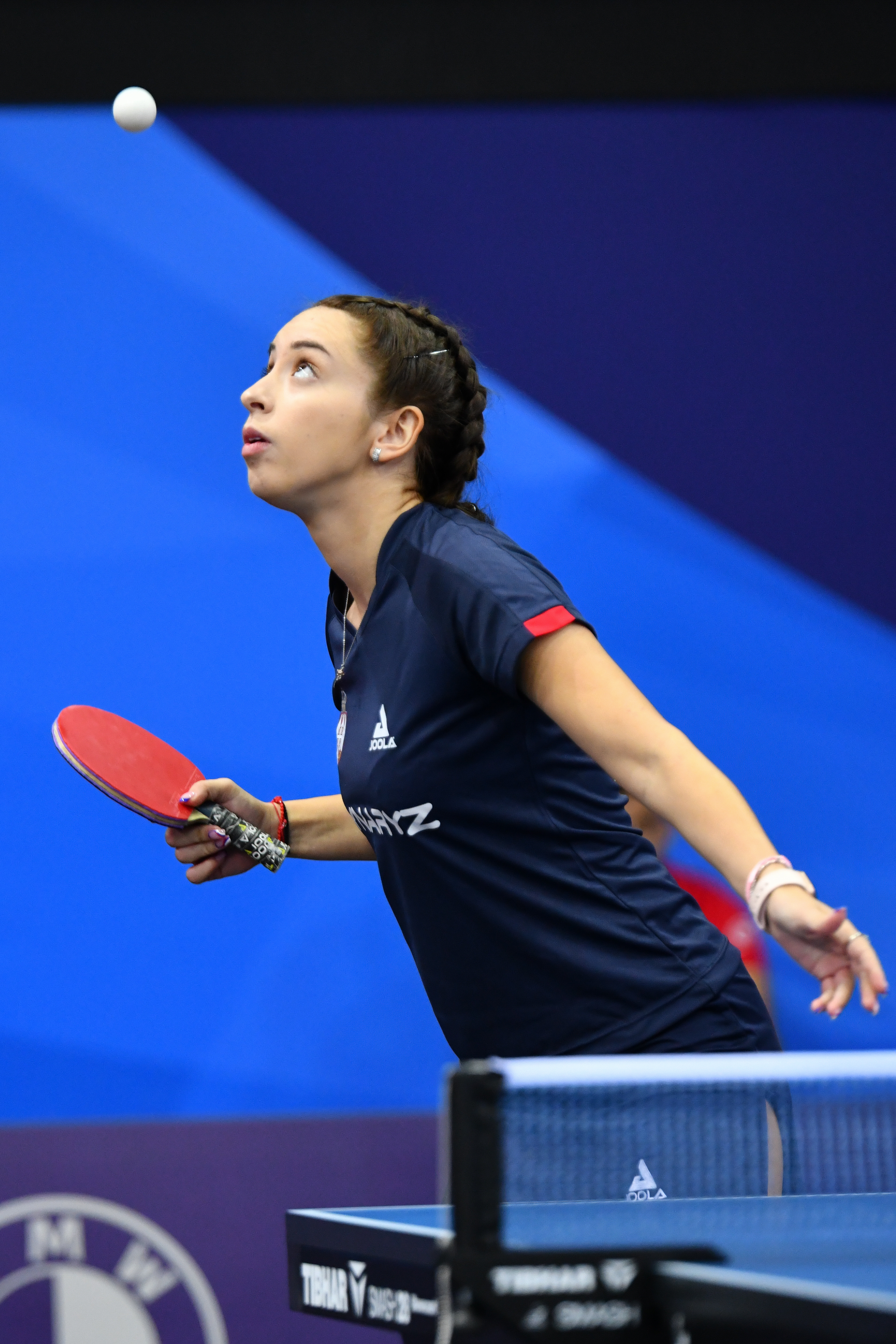

Personal information
- Nationality: Serbian
- Born: 7 November 1999 (age 26)

Sport
- Sport: Table tennis
- Highest ranking: 69 (1 April 2025)
- Current ranking: 76 (15 July 2025)
Medal record
Women's table tennis
Representing Serbia
European Championships
Bronze medal – third place	2024 Linz	Doubles
Mediterranean Games
Bronze medal – third place	2026 Taranto	Singles
Bronze medal – third place	2026 Taranto	Team

Izabela Lupulesku (born 7 November 1999) is a Serbian table tennis player. Her highest career ITTF ranking was 69.
