= Adina Diaconu =

Romanian table tennis player

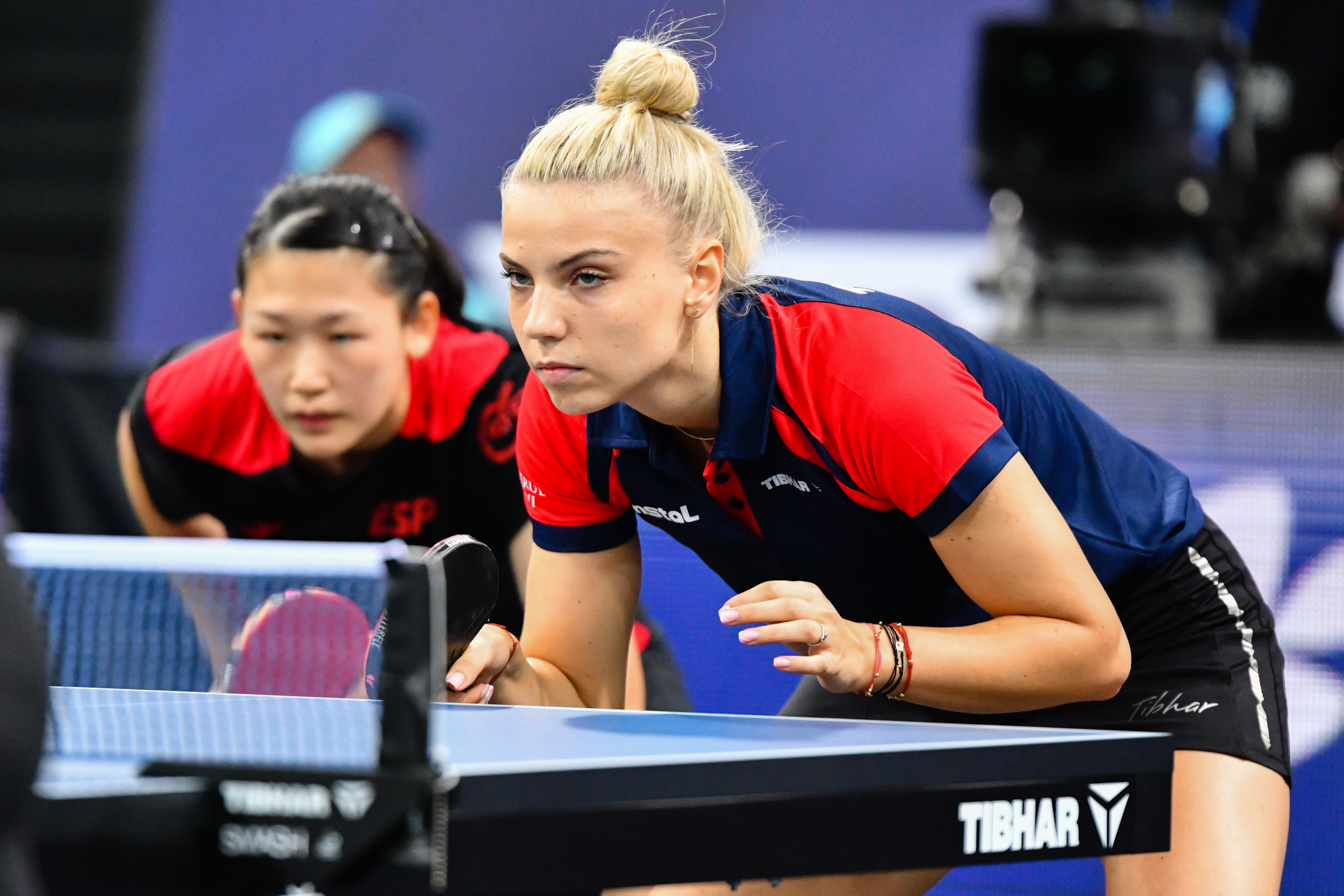

Personal information
- Full name: Adina Mihaela Diaconu
- Born: 14 October 1999 (age 26) Slatina, Olt, Romania

Sport
- Sport: Table tennis
- Playing style: Right-handed, shakehand grip
- Highest ranking: 47 (30 January 2024)
- Current ranking: 75 (15 July 2025)
Medal record
Women's table tennis
Representing Romania
World Championships
Bronze medal – third place	2026 London	Team
European Games
Gold medal – first place	2023 Kraków–Małopolska	Team
European Championships
Gold medal – first place	2019 Nantes	Team
Silver medal – second place	2021 Cluj-Napoca	Team
Silver medal – second place	2023 Malmö	Team
Silver medal – second place	2025 Zadar	Team
Bronze medal – third place	2022 Munich	Doubles

Adina Mihaela Diaconu (born 14 October 1999) is a Romanian table tennis player.

In 2015 and 2016, she was part of the Romanian junior team which won gold medals at the European Youth Table Tennis Championships. She won European youth titles in three different age categories, including the cadet champion in 2013 and 2014, the junior champion in 2015 and 2016, and the U21 champion in 2019.
