= Christina Källberg =

Swedish table tennis player

Personal information
- Nationality: Sweden
- Born: 1 April 2000 (age 26)

Sport
- Sport: Table tennis
- Highest ranking: 53 (1 May 2022)
- Current ranking: 78 (28 September 2026)
Medal record
Women's table tennis
Representing Sweden
European Championships
Bronze medal – third place	2026 Ljubljana	Mixed doubles

Christina Källberg (born 1 April 2000) is a Swedish table tennis player. She competed in the 2020 Summer Olympics.
