= Prithika Pavade =

French table tennis player

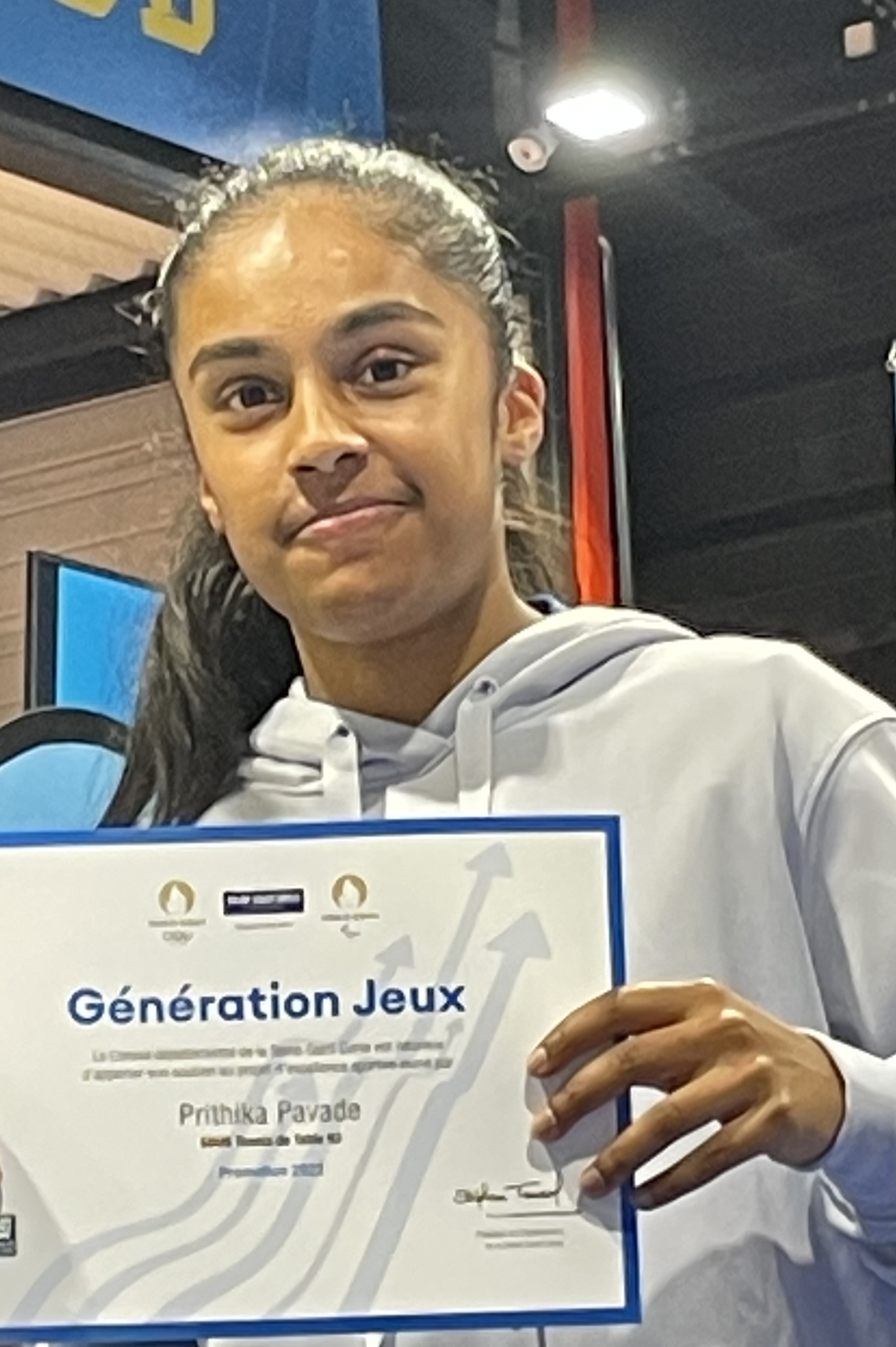

Personal information
- Born: 2 August 2004 (age 22) Villepinte, France
- Height: 1.61 m (5 ft 3 in)

Sport
- Sport: Table tennis
- Playing style: Left-handed shakehand
- Highest ranking: 19 (19 June 2024)
- Current ranking: 40 (28 September 2026)
Medal record
Women's table tennis
Representing France
World Championships
Bronze medal – third place	2024 Busan	Team
European Championships
Bronze medal – third place	2020 Warsaw	Mixed doubles
Bronze medal – third place	2021 Cluj-Napoca	Team
Bronze medal – third place	2023 Malmö	Team
Bronze medal – third place	2024 Linz	Mixed doubles
Bronze medal – third place	2026 Ljubljana	Singles

Prithika Pavade (born 2 August 2004) is a French table tennis player. She competed in the 2020 Summer Olympics and the 2024 Summer Olympics. She is currently the highest ranked French Women's singles paddler, peaking at rank 19 on 1 August 2024.

== Biography ==
She discovered table tennis under the influence of her father, who was born, like her mother, in Pondicherry and who played for a long time at a good level in India. The family moved to Le Bourget, near the Paul-Simon gymnasium, where she played for the Bourget table tennis club. She started playing this sport when she was in the first grade. A left-handed player, Pavade became known for her speed and intelligence.
