= Charlotte Lutz =

French table tennis player (born 2005)

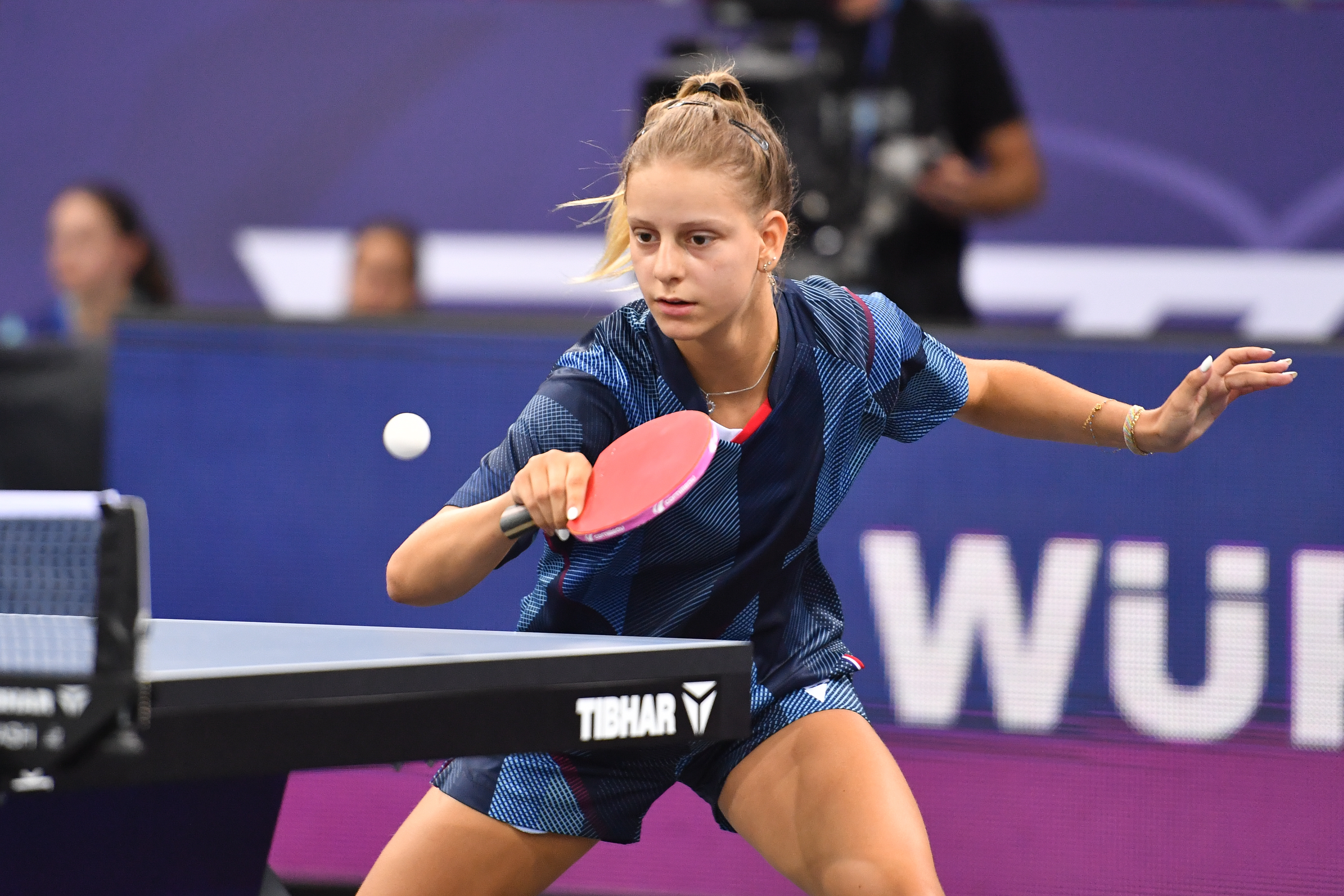

Personal information
- Born: 17 May 2005 (age 21) Hochfelden, France

Sport
- Sport: Table tennis
- Playing style: Right-handed shakehand
- Highest ranking: 50 (9 February 2026)
- Current ranking: 51 (2 March 2026)
Medal record
Women's table tennis
Representing France
World Championships
Bronze medal – third place	2024 Busan	Team
European Championships
Silver medal – second place	2026 Ljubljana	Mixed doubles
Bronze medal – third place	2023 Malmö	Team

Charlotte Lutz (born 17 May 2005) is a French table tennis player.

== Playing career ==
Charlotte Lutz began to play table tennis at the age 5, following in the footsteps of her big sister Camille Lutz. She has been training at CREPS in Strasbourg since 2020 after a stint at Pôle France in Nancy.

She was selected for the French team for the 2022 European Championships and the 2022 World Team Championships. With her, the French women's team ranks third in the European team championships in September 2023.

In February 2024, she was a bronze medalist at the 2024 World Team Table Tennis Championships after France's team was defeated in the semi-final by China. It has been 33 years since the French women's team has won a medal at the World Team Championships (the last also being a bronze medal in 1991).
