= Table tennis at the 2023 European Games – Women's singles =

Table tennis – Women's singles at the 2023 European Games
- Venue: Hutnik Arena
- Location: Kraków, Poland
- Date: 23–27 June
- Competitors: 51 from 28 nations

Medalists
gold medal	Bernadette Szőcs	Romania
silver medal	Xiaoxin Yang	Monaco
bronze medal	Elizabeta Samara	Romania

The women's singles in table tennis at the 2023 European Games in Kraków was held at the Hutnik Arena from 23 to 27 June 2023.

== Seeds ==
Seeding was based on the ITTF World Ranking lists published on 20 June 2023.

1. Han Ying (GER) (quarterfinals)
2. Sofia Polcanova (AUT) (fourth round)
3. Nina Mittelham (GER) (quarterfinals)
4. Xiaoxin Yang (MON) (final, silver medalist)
5. Jia Nan Yuan (FRA) (quarterfinals)
6. Bernadette Szőcs (ROU) (champion, gold medalist)
7. Fu Yu (POR) (quarterfinals)
8. Elizabeta Samara (ROU) (semifinals, bronze medalist)
9. Barbora Balážová (SVK) (third round)
10. Shao Jieni (POR) (fourth round)
11. Hana Matelová (CZE) (fourth round)
12. Ni Xialian (LUX) (third round)
13. Linda Bergström (SWE) (fourth round)
14. Natalia Bajor (POL) (semifinals, fourth place)
15. Tatiana Kukuľková (SVK) (third round)
16. Margaryta Pesotska (UKR) (third round)

== Draw ==
=== Finals ===
Semifinals
8	Elizabeta Samara (ROU)	9	5	9	4
4	Xiaoxin Yang (MON)	11	11	11	11
6	Bernadette Szőcs (ROU)	11	11	11	11
14	Natalia Bajor (POL)	6	9	3	5

Gold medal match
4	Xiaoxin Yang (MON)	11	11	7	11	11	9	3
6	Bernadette Szőcs (ROU)	4	7	11	8	13	11	11
Bronze medal match
8	Elizabeta Samara (ROU)	11	4	13	11	9	9	11
14	Natalia Bajor (POL)	9	11	11	7	11	11	7

=== Top half ===
==== Section 1 ====
First round
Mischek (AUT)	3	12	13	11	6	11
Avameri (EST)	11	10	11	8	11	9

Second round
Terpou (GRE)	6	3	9	8
Piccolin (ITA)	11	11	11	11
Šurjan (SRB)	11	11	11	11
Stražar (SLO)	7	3	6	7
Mischek (AUT)	5	12	3	11	11	11	10
Malobabić (CRO)	11	10	11	13	6	9	12
Altınkaya (TUR)	7	12	11	9	11	9	9
Blašková (CZE)	11	10	8	11	8	11	11

Third round
1	Han (GER)	11	11	11	11
Piccolin (ITA)	2	3	1	7
Šurjan (SRB)	6	11	10	11	10
13	Bergström (SWE)	11	13	12	6	12
9	Balážová (SVK)	7	11	11	5	8
Malobabić (CRO)	11	13	9	11	11
Blašková (CZE)	4	8	7	7
8	Samara (ROU)	11	11	11	11

Fourth round
1	Han (GER)	8	11	8	11	11	11
13	Bergström (SWE)	11	5	11	9	3	3
Malobabić (CRO)	3	6	2	8
8	Samara (ROU)	11	11	11	11

Quarterfinals
1	Han (GER)	11	11	1	10	7	8
8	Samara (ROU)	8	1	11	12	11	11

==== Section 2 ====
Second round
Węgrzyn (POL)	11	8	7	11	11	11	11
Zhang (ESP)	7	11	11	1	13	4	13
Pavade (FRA)	11	14	11	11
Ho (GBR)	9	12	9	4
Degraef (BEL)	5	6	7	6
Madarász (HUN)	11	11	11	11
Moret (SUI)	11	10	8	11	11	8	10
Helle (NED)	4	12	11	9	7	11	12

Third round
7	Yu (POR)	11	11	11	11
Zhang (ESP)	8	4	6	5
Pavade (FRA)	12	8	12	3	11	11
12	Ni (LUX)	10	11	10	11	7	9
16	Pesotska (UKR)	12	11	11	11	7	15
Madarász (HUN)	14	9	5	13	11	17
Helle (NED)	4	5	10	5
4	Yang (MON)	11	11	12	11

Fourth round
7	Yu (POR)	11	8	11	7	11	12
Pavade (FRA)	6	11	4	11	6	10
Madarász (HUN)	1	3	8	11
4	Yang (MON)	11	11	11	13

Quarterfinals
7	Yu (POR)	10	4	7	2
4	Yang (MON)	12	11	11	11

=== Bottom half ===
==== Section 3 ====
First round
Hanson (EST)	4	11	10	7	11	6
Tofant (SLO)	11	6	12	11	8	11

Second round
Men (NED)	11	3	12	8	9
Xiao (ESP)	2	11	14	11	11
Källberg (SWE)	10	15	9	12	11	11	17
Nagyváradi (HUN)	12	13	11	10	9	13	19
Marchetti (BEL)	8	11	9	12	5	11	6
Arapović (CRO)	11	7	11	10	11	9	11
Yılmaz (TUR)	6	11	8	7	12
Tofant (SLO)	11	7	11	11	14

Third round
3	Mittelham (GER)	7	11	11	9	13	11
Xiao (ESP)	11	6	6	11	11	7
Nagyváradi (HUN)	8	8	9	6
10	Shao (POR)	11	11	11	11
11	Matelová (CZE)	9	7	11	12	11	11	15
Arapović (CRO)	11	11	5	14	6	8	13
Tofant (SLO)	6	7	7	7
6	Szőcs (ROU)	11	11	11	11

Fourth round
3	Mittelham (GER)	11	11	11	9	11
10	Shao (POR)	8	9	3	11	6
11	Matelová (CZE)	9	10	11	12	3	13
6	Szőcs (ROU)	11	12	8	10	11	15

Quarterfinals
3	Mittelham (GER)	8	11	6	12	7	4
6	Szőcs (ROU)	11	5	11	10	11	11

==== Section 4 ====
First round
Riliškytė (LTU)	8	9	8	13	18	15	11
Nikoiani (GEO)	11	11	11	11	16	13	9

Second round
Riliškytė (LTU)	11	11	11	12
Vivarelli (ITA)	9	6	9	10
Brateyko (UKR)	11	11	11	11
Carey (GBR)	8	5	7	8
Toftaker (NOR)	8	5	11	5	8
De Nutte (LUX)	11	11	9	11	11
Lupulesku (SRB)	9	8	11	8	10
Toliou (GRE)	11	11	3	11	12

Third round
5	Yuan (FRA)	11	11	11	11
Riliškytė (LTU)	8	6	4	6
Brateyko (UKR)	11	11	12	7	11
15	Kukuľková (SVK)	7	6	10	11	7
14	Bajor (POL)	11	11	12	3	11	11
De Nutte (LUX)	9	7	14	11	6	7
Toliou (GRE)	5	5	6	7
2	Polcanova (AUT)	11	11	11	11

Fourth round
5	Yuan (FRA)	11	10	11	5	11	7	11
Brateyko (UKR)	2	12	9	11	6	11	6
14	Bajor (POL)	4	11	11	11	12
2	Polcanova (AUT)	11	4	3	8	10

Quarterfinals
5	Yuan (FRA)	11	7	11	11	6	6
14	Bajor (POL)	9	11	5	13	11	11
