= Table tennis at the 2019 European Games – Women's singles =

Table tennis – Women's singles at the 2019 European Games
- Venue: Tennis Olympic Centre
- Date: 22–26 June
- Competitors: 49 from 29 nations

Medalists
gold medal	Fu Yu	Portugal
silver medal	Han Ying	Germany
bronze medal	Ni Xialian	Luxembourg

The women's singles in table tennis at the 2019 European Games in Minsk is the second edition of the event in a European Games. It was held at the Tennis Olympic Centre from 22 to 26 June 2019.

== Schedule ==
All times are FET (UTC+03:00)

Date	Time	Event
Saturday, 22 June 2019	10:00	First round
Saturday, 22 June 2019	13:00	Second round
Sunday, 23 June 2019	13:00	Third round
Monday, 24 June 2019	13:00	Fourth round
Tuesday, 25 June 2019	13:00	Quarterfinals
Wednesday, 26 June 2019	10:00	Semifinals
Wednesday, 26 June 2019	16:00	Bronze medal match
Wednesday, 26 June 2019	18:00	Gold medal match

== Seeds ==
The seeding lists were announced on 9 June 2019.

1. Bernadette Szőcs (ROU)
2. Sofia Polcanova (AUT)
3. Matilda Ekholm (SWE)
4. Petrissa Solja (GER)
5. Elizabeta Samara (ROU)
6. Georgina Póta (HUN)
7. Li Jie (NED)
8. Fu Yu (POR)
9. Britt Eerland (NED)
10. Margaryta Pesotska (UKR)
11. Barbora Balážová (SVK)
12. Polina Mikhaylova (RUS)
13. Han Ying (GER)
14. Li Qian (POL)
15. Ni Xialian (LUX)
16. Hana Matelová (CZE)

== Draw ==
=== Key ===
- Q = Qualifier
- w/o = Walkover
- w/d = Withdraw
- r = Retired
- DQ = Disqualified

=== Finals ===
Semifinals
15	Ni (LUX)	6	5	11	11	6	8
8	Fu (POR)	11	11	5	6	11	11
Yang (MON)	11	9	8	10	11	11	9
13	Han (GER)	7	11	11	12	8	9	11

Gold medal match
8	Fu (POR)	11	11	9	9	11	11
13	Han (GER)	5	8	11	11	6	7
Bronze medal match
15	Ni (LUX)	11	3	10	11	11	11
Yang (MON)	3	11	12	7	7	8

=== Top half ===
==== Section 1 ====
Round 2
Gasnier (FRA)	11	11	11	11
Lung (BEL)	8	4	8	9
Solja (AUT)	11	11	11	11
Carey (GBR)	7	8	5	6
Bergström (SWE)	11	13	15	11	9	11
Yovkova (BUL)	5	15	13	8	11	5
Čechová (CZE)	5	9	11	11	10
Bogdanova (BLR)	11	11	6	13	12

Round 3
1	Szőcs (ROU)	11	13	11	11
Gasnier (FRA)	6	11	7	8
15	Ni (LUX)	11	11	11	11	11
Solja (AUT)	1	13	1	6	4
11	Balážová (SVK)	11	9	8	11
Bergström (SWE)	13	11	11	13
6	Póta (HUN)	11	11	11	11
Bogdanova (BLR)	9	6	6	5

Round 4
1	Szőcs (ROU)	7	8	9	11	11	11	7
15	Ni (LUX)	11	11	11	7	9	8	11
Bergström (SWE)	11	11	11	15
6	Póta (HUN)	6	4	8	13

Quarterfinals
15	Ni (LUX)	11	11	11	5	11
Bergström (SWE)	8	7	9	11	9

==== Section 2 ====
Round 2
Moret (SUI)	15	7	11	11	13
Hadžiahmetović (BIH)	13	11	5	9	11
Haponova (UKR)	11	8	14	9	13	11
Lupulesku (SRB)	5	11	12	11	11	6
Noskova (RUS)	11	9	11	11	11
Dvorak (ESP)	4	11	7	9	5
Vivarelli (ITA)	9	7	11	6	10
Yılmaz (TUR)	11	11	9	11	12

Round 3
8	Fu (POR)	11	11	13	9	13
Moret (SUI)	6	5	11	11	11
9	Eerland (NED)	12	3	4	7	8
Haponova (UKR)	10	11	11	11	11
14	Li (POL)	11	11	12	11
Noskova (RUS)	9	8	10	9
4	Solja (GER)	11	11	11	11
Yılmaz (TUR)	6	6	5	8

Round 4
8	Fu (POR)	11	11	11	9	11
Haponova (UKR)	3	5	7	11	7
14	Li (POL)	14	8	12	6	11	10	5
4	Solja (GER)	12	11	10	11	5	12	11

Quarterfinals
8	Fu (POR)	11	12	10	11	8	7	13
4	Solja (GER)	8	10	12	6	11	11	11

=== Bottom half ===
==== Section 3 ====
Round 1
Ho (GBR)	11	11	11	11
Kirichenko (FIN)	3	5	6	5

Round 2
Partyka (POL)	11	11	11	11	13
Todorović (SRB)	13	9	9	7	5
Galič (SLO)	8	5	3	4
Piccolin (ITA)	11	11	11	11
Yang (MON)	13	11	11	11
Ho (GBR)	11	5	9	7
Xiao (ESP)	11	4	6	5	12	9
Paulovich (BLR)	7	11	11	11	10	11

Round 3
3	Ekholm (SWE)	5	11	11	6	11	11
Partyka (POL)	11	7	5	11	8	8
12	Mikhaylova (RUS)	11	4	11	11	11
Piccolin (ITA)	7	11	7	5	4
10	Pesotska (UKR)	11	2	9	9	5
Yang (MON)	5	11	11	11	11
5	Samara (ROU)	11	7	9	11	6	12	11
Paulovich (BLR)	9	11	11	5	11	10	13

Round 4
3	Ekholm (SWE)	5	13	11	8	11	7	8
12	Mikhaylova (RUS)	11	11	9	11	5	11	11
Yang (MON)	12	11	11	11
Paulovich (BLR)	10	5	7	7

Quarterfinals
12	Mikhaylova (RUS)	7	9	1	5
Yang (MON)	11	11	11	11

==== Section 4 ====
Round 2
Loeuillette (FRA)	11	11	12	8	12
Jeger (CRO)	7	8	10	11	10
Shao (POR)	11	11	13	9	11	11
Toliou (GRE)	6	1	15	11	3	5
De Nutte (LUX)	9	17	11	9	11	11	11
Kukuľková (SVK)	11	19	8	11	9	6	7
Pergel (HUN)	11	11	4	11	9	10	9
Marchetti (BEL)	6	8	11	7	11	12	11

Round 3
7	Li (NED)	12	11	11
Loeuillette (FRA)	10	8	8	2
16	Matelová (CZE)	5	7	11	11	11	8	13
Shao (POR)	11	11	4	9	7	11	15
13	Han (GER)	11	11	11	11
De Nutte (LUX)	6	7	9	4
2	Polcanova (AUT)	11	11	11	11
Marchetti (BEL)	4	7	5	8

Round 4
7	Li (NED)	9	9	11	12	13	11	11
Shao (POR)	11	11	6	10	15	5	7
13	Han (GER)	12	13	13	11
2	Polcanova (AUT)	10	11	11	8

Quarterfinals
7	Li (NED)	5	11	12	7	5
13	Han (GER)	11	8	14	11	11
