= 2022 European Table Tennis Championships – Women's doubles =

Women's doubles at the 2022 European Table Tennis Championships
- Venue: Rudi-Sedlmayer-Halle
- Location: Munich, Germany
- Dates: 13–18 August
- Competitors: 98 from 34 nations

Medalists
gold medal	Sofia Polcanova (AUT); Bernadette Szőcs (ROU)
silver medal	Elizabeta Samara (ROU); Andreea Dragoman (ROU)
bronze medal	María Xiao (ESP); Adina Diaconu (ROU)
bronze medal	Ni Xialian (LUX); Sarah De Nutte (LUX)

The women's doubles competition of the 2022 European Table Tennis Championships was held from 13 to 18 August 2022.

== Playing system ==
World WD ranking week 28; 12.07.2022.
51 pairs
16 pairs are directly qualified for the main draw as a seeded pairs.
Qualification stage: 35 pairs will play qualification in two preliminary rounds. The winners of the preliminary round 2 matches will qualify for the Main draw.

== Preliminary round ==
The winners of the preliminary round 2 matches will qualify for the Main draw.

First round
B Bogdanova (LAT); E Jankauskienė (LTU)	2
M Munné (ESP); Á Rodríguez (ESP)	3

Second round
P Pavade (FRA); C Lutz (FRA)
M Munné (ESP); Á Rodríguez (ESP)	W/O
E Riliškytė (LTU); K Riliškytė (LTU)	1
A Todorović (SRB); S Šurjan (SRB)	3
A Toliou (GRE); R Moret (SUI)	3
R Betz (FIN); A Kirichenko (FIN)	1
S Musajeva (LAT); A Chiriacova (MDA)	2
B Bálint (HUN); L Hartbrich (HUN)	3
I Matos (POR); M Pinto (POR)	3
M Gnjatić (BIH); D Biogradlić (BIH)	0
A Solja (AUT); M Ševčíková (CZE)	3
S Zhang (ESP); M Degraef (BEL)	0
N Partyka (POL); N Bajor (POL)	3
S de Hoop (NED); S Tokić (SLO)	0
L Zeqiri (KOS); A Uce-Nikolov (MKD)	0
N Puchovanová (SVK); Ö Yılmaz (TUR)	3
D Vignjević (SRB); I Lupulesku (SRB)	3
R Hanson (EST); A Avameri (EST)	1
S Men (NED); E Ernst (NED)	0
I Malobabić (CRO); S Brateyko (UKR)	3
N Arlia (ITA); G Monfardini (ITA)	3
K Paridi (GRE); E Terpou (GRE)	1
M Toftaker (NOR); R Carlsen (NOR)	2
O Guisnel (FRA); C Lutz (FRA)	3
A Kaufmann (GER); F Schreiner (GER)	3
A Barbosa (LUX); T Gonderinger (LUX)	1
K Hristova (BUL); R Skåttet (NOR)	1
M Xiao (ESP); A Diaconu (ROU)	3
M Yovkova (BUL); P Trifonova (BUL)	3
H Mešetović (BIH); F Meletie (CYP)	0
S Kulakçeken (TUR); S Altinkaya (TUR)	1
A Węgrzyn (POL); K Węgrzyn (POL)	3

== Main draw ==
Results

Round of 32
1	X Ni (LUX); S De Nutte (LUX)	3
B Bálint (HUN); L Hartbrich (HUN)	1
D Vignjević (SRB); I Lupulesku (SRB)	3
12	K Tomanovská (CZE); Z Blašková (CZE)	1
16	R Muskantor (SWE); F Bergand (SWE)	3
A Solja (AUT); M Ševčíková (CZE)	1
A Todorović (SRB); S Šurjan (SRB)	0
5	C Källberg (SWE); L Bergström (SWE)	3
7	E Samara (ROU); A Dragoman (ROU)	3
O Guisnel (FRA); C Lutz (FRA)	0
N Puchovanová (SVK); Ö Yılmaz (TUR)	3
13	A Tofant (SLO); K Stražar (SLO)	2
9	K Mischek (AUT); TT Ho (ENG)	3
I Malobabić (CRO); S Brateyko (UKR)	2
M Yovkova (BUL); P Trifonova (BUL)	0
4	H Matelová (CZE); B Balážová (SVK)	3
3	S Polcanova (AUT); B Szőcs (ROU)	3
N Arlia (ITA); G Monfardini (ITA)	0
N Partyka (POL); N Bajor (POL)	3
11	H Arapović (CRO); M Jeger (CRO)	1
15	F Yu (POR); J Shao (POR)	3
A Toliou (GRE); R Moret (SUI)	1
M Munné (ESP); Á Rodríguez (ESP)	0
8	E Labošová (SVK); T Kukuľková (SVK)	3
6	D Madarász (HUN); G Póta (HUN)	0
M Xiao (ESP); A Diaconu (ROU)	3
I Matos (POR); M Pinto (POR)	0
10	G Piccolin (ITA); D Vivarelli (ITA)	3
14	T Bilenko (UKR); G Gaponova (UKR)	0
A Kaufmann (GER); F Schreiner (GER)	3
A Węgrzyn (POL); K Węgrzyn (POL)	2
2	S Winter (GER); N Mittelham (GER)	3

Round of 16
1	X Ni (LUX); S De Nutte (LUX)	3
D Vignjević (SRB); I Lupulesku (SRB)	1
16	R Muskantor (SWE); F Bergand (SWE)	1
5	C Källberg (SWE); L Bergström (SWE)	3
7	E Samara (ROU); A Dragoman (ROU)	3
N Puchovanová (SVK); Ö Yılmaz (TUR)	0
9	K Mischek (AUT); TT Ho (ENG)	0
4	H Matelová (CZE); B Balážová (SVK)	3
3	S Polcanova (AUT); B Szőcs (ROU)	3
N Partyka (POL); N Bajor (POL)	0
15	F Yu (POR); J Shao (POR)	3
8	E Labošová (SVK); T Kukuľková (SVK)	1
M Xiao (ESP); A Diaconu (ROU)	3
10	G Piccolin (ITA); D Vivarelli (ITA)	1
A Kaufmann (GER); F Schreiner (GER)	0
2	S Winter (GER); N Mittelham (GER)	3

Quarterfinals
1	X Ni (LUX); S De Nutte (LUX)	3
5	C Källberg (SWE); L Bergström (SWE)	1
7	E Samara (ROU); A Dragoman (ROU)	3
4	H Matelová (CZE); B Balážová (SVK)	0
3	S Polcanova (AUT); B Szőcs (ROU)	3
15	F Yu (POR); J Shao (POR)	0
M Xiao (ESP); A Diaconu (ROU)	3
2	S Winter (GER); N Mittelham (GER)	1

Semifinals
1	X Ni (LUX); S De Nutte (LUX)	1
7	E Samara (ROU); A Dragoman (ROU)	3
3	S Polcanova (AUT); B Szőcs (ROU)	3
M Xiao (ESP); A Diaconu (ROU)	0

Final
7	E Samara (ROU); A Dragoman (ROU)	0
3	S Polcanova (AUT); B Szőcs (ROU)	3

== Participating nations ==
98 players from 34 nations.

- Austria (3)
- Belgium (1)
- Bosnia and Herzegovina (3)
- Bulgaria (3)
- Croatia (3)
- Cyprus (1)
- Czech Republic (4)
- England (1)
- Estonia (2)
- Finland (2)
- France (4)
- Germany (4)
- Greece (3)
- Hungary (4)
- Italy (4)
- Kosovo (1)
- Latvia (2)
- Lithuania (3)
- Luxembourg (4)
- Moldova (1)
- Netherlands (3)
- North Macedonia (1)
- Norway (3)
- Poland (4)
- Portugal (4)
- Romania (4)
- Serbia (4)
- Slovakia (4)
- Slovenia (3)
- Spain (4)
- Sweden (4)
- Switzerland (1)
- Turkey (3)
- Ukraine (3)
