= Table tennis at the 2023 European Games – Women's team =

Table tennis – Women's team at the 2023 European Games
- Venue: Hutnik Arena
- Location: Kraków, Poland
- Date: 28 June – 1 July
- Nations: 12
- Teams: 12

Medalists
gold medal	Adina Diaconu; Andreea Dragoman; Elizabeta Samara; Bernadette Szőcs	Romania
silver medal	Han Ying; Nina Mittelham; Shan Xiaona; Sabine Winter	Germany
bronze medal	Inês Matos; Matilde Pinto; Shao Jieni; Fu Yu	Portugal

The women's team competition in table tennis at the 2023 European Games in Kraków was held at the Hutnik Arena from 28 June to 1 July 2023.

== Seeds ==
1. Germany (GER)
2. Romania (ROU)
3. France (FRA)
4. Portugal (POR)
5. Hungary (HUN)
6. Slovakia (SVK)
7. Austria (AUT)
8. Luxembourg (LUX)
9. Poland (POL)
10. Czech Republic (CZE)
11. Sweden (SWE)
12. Ukraine (UKR)

== Results ==
=== Bracket ===
Round of 16
28 June
11 Sweden	3
6 Slovakia	2
28 June
8 Luxembourg	2
12 Ukraine	3
28 June
9 Poland	3
7 Austria	1
28 June
5 Hungary	3
10 Czech Republic	1

Quarterfinals
29 June
1 Germany	3
11 Sweden	1
29 June
12 Ukraine	1
4 Portugal	3
29 June
3 France	3
9 Poland	0
29 June
5 Hungary	0
2 Romania	3

Semifinals
30 June
1 Germany	3
4 Portugal	0
30 June
3 France	1
2 Romania	3

Gold medal match
1 July
1 Germany	2
2 Romania	3
Bronze medal match
1 July
4 Portugal	3
3 France	0

=== Round of 16 ===
28 June 2023; 10:00; Report	Slovakia	2 – 3	Sweden

Ema Labošová / Barbora Balážová	3–1	Filippa Bergand / Christina Källberg	11–4, 4–11, 11–8, 12–10
Tatiana Kukuľková	1–3	Linda Bergström	4–11, 6–11, 11–5, 11–13
Barbora Balážová	3–2	Christina Källberg	9–11, 11–9, 5–11, 11–7, 11–8
Tatiana Kukuľková	2–3	Filippa Bergand	4–11, 11–7, 6–11, 11–7, 7–11
Ema Labošová	0–3	Linda Bergström	7–11, 6–11, 6–11

28 June 2023; 13:00; Report	Luxembourg	2 – 3	Ukraine

Tessy Gonderinger / Sarah De Nutte	0–3	Hanna Haponova / Solomiya Brateyko	10–12, 4–11, 8–11
Ni Xialian	3–1	Margaryta Pesotska	13–11, 11–6, 5–11, 11–8
Sarah De Nutte	1–3	Solomiya Brateyko	14–12, 9–11, 10–12, 10–12
Ni Xialian	3–0	Hanna Haponova	11–8, 11–4, 11–5
Tessy Gonderinger	1–3	Margaryta Pesotska	4–11, 11–8, 5–11, 8–11

28 June 2023; 16:00; Report	Austria	1 – 3	Poland

Anastasia Sterner / Liu Jia	1–3	Anna Węgrzyn / Katarzyna Węgrzyn	11–8, 7–11, 10–12, 7–11
Sofia Polcanova	0–3	Natalia Bajor	4–11, 6–11, 6–11
Liu Jia	3–1	Katarzyna Węgrzyn	11–4, 10–12, 11–9, 11–5
Sofia Polcanova	0–3	Anna Węgrzyn	w/o

28 June 2023; 19:00; Report	Hungary	3 – 1	Czech Republic

Bernadett Bálint / Mercédesz Nagyváradi	0–3	Kateřina Tomanovská / Zdena Blašková	9–11, 5–11, 8–11
Dóra Madarász	3–1	Hana Matelová	4–11, 11–4, 11–5, 11–9
Mercédesz Nagyváradi	3–0	Zdena Blašková	11–5, 11–7, 12–10
Dóra Madarász	3–0	Kateřina Tomanovská	11–3, 11–9, 11–9

=== Quarterfinals ===
29 June 2023; 10:00; Report	Portugal	3 – 1	Ukraine

Inês Matos / Fu Yu	3–2	Anastasiia Dmytrenko / Solomiya Brateyko	2–11, 11–4, 11–9, 5–11, 11–4
Shao Jieni	1–3	Margaryta Pesotska	3–11, 11–9, 7–11, 7–11
Fu Yu	3–1	Solomiya Brateyko	12–10, 2–11, 11–1, 11–5
Shao Jieni	3–0	Anastasiia Dmytrenko	11–7, 11–9, 11–5

29 June 2023; 13:00; Report	Germany	3 – 1	Sweden

Shan Xiaona / Nina Mittelham	3–0	Linda Bergström / Christina Källberg	11–8, 11–9, 11–4
Han Ying	3–0	Filippa Bergand	11–1, 11–3, 11–1
Nina Mittelham	1–3	Christina Källberg	6–11, 11–6, 4–11, 9–11
Han Ying	3–2	Linda Bergström	11–6, 6–11, 11–4, 3–11, 11–5

29 June 2023; 16:00; Report	France	3 – 0	Poland

Camille Lutz / Prithika Pavade	3–0	Anna Węgrzyn / Katarzyna Węgrzyn	11–2, 11–5, 11–5
Yuan Jia Nan	3–0	Natalia Bajor	13–11, 11–5, 11–5
Prithika Pavade	3–1	Katarzyna Węgrzyn	11–8, 11–8, 4–11, 11–3

29 June 2023; 19:00; Report	Romania	3 – 0	Hungary

Adina Diaconu / Elizabeta Samara	3–0	Bernadett Bálint / Mercédesz Nagyváradi	11–6, 11–8, 11–4
Bernadette Szőcs	3–0	Dóra Madarász	13–11, 11–8, 11–4
Elizabeta Samara	3–0	Mercédesz Nagyváradi	11–8, 11–7, 11–5

=== Semifinals ===
30 June 2023; 10:00; Report	Portugal	0 – 3	Germany

Inês Matos / Shao Jieni	0–3	Nina Mittelham / Shan Xiaona	5–11, 6–11, 7–11
Fu Yu	1–3	Han Ying	6–11, 4–11, 11–6, 7–11
Shao Jieni	1–3	Shan Xiaona	7–11, 12–10, 13–15, 12–14

30 June 2023; 13:00; Report	Romania	3 – 1	France

Adina Diaconu / Elizabeta Samara	2–3	Prithika Pavade / Camille Lutz	9–11, 11–8, 11–9, 4–11, 9–11
Bernadette Szőcs	3–0	Yuan Jia Nan	12–10, 11–6, 11–9
Elizabeta Samara	3–0	Camille Lutz	11–6, 11–8, 11–3
Bernadette Szőcs	3–1	Prithika Pavade	11–9, 6–11, 11–7, 11–7

=== Bronze medal match ===
1 July 2023; 11:00; Report	Portugal	3 – 0	France

Matilde Pinto / Fu Yu	3–1	Camille Lutz / Prithika Pavade	11–4, 9–11, 11–7, 11–4
Shao Jieni	3–2	Yuan Jia Nan	6–11, 8–11, 11–7, 11–7, 11–7
Fu Yu	3–1	Prithika Pavade	11–8, 7–11, 11–7, 11–9

=== Gold medal match ===
1 July 2023; 14:30; Report	Germany	2 – 3	Romania

Nina Mittelham / Shan Xiaona	2–3	Adina Diaconu / Andreea Dragoman	11–8, 17–19, 7–11, 11–8, 5–11
Han Ying	2–3	Bernadette Szőcs	11–4, 12–10, 8–11, 9–11, 8–11
Shan Xiaona	3–2	Andreea Dragoman	9–11, 11–6, 11–6, 8–11, 15–13
Han Ying	3–0	Adina Diaconu	11–6, 11–5, 11–9
Nina Mittelham	0–3	Bernadette Szőcs	9–11, 9–11, 4–11
