= 2021 Europe Top 16 Cup =

Table tennis competition

Tournament details
- Dates: 18–19 September 2021
- Edition: 50th
- Competitors: 32
- Venue: YMCA Sports Center
- Location: Thessaloniki, Greece

Champions
- Men's singles: (Germany) Patrick Franziska
- Women's singles: (Germany) Nina Mittelham

The 2021 Europe Top 16 Cup (also referred to as the 2021 Pomegranate Europe Top 16 Cup for sponsorship reasons) was a table tennis competition, held on 18 and 19 September 2021 in Thessaloniki, Greece, organised under the authority of the European Table Tennis Union (ETTU). It was the 50th edition of the event, and the first time that it had been held in Greece.

== Medallists ==
Event	Gold	Silver	Bronze
Men's Singles	(Germany) Patrick Franziska	(Portugal) Marcos Freitas	(Sweden) Mattias Falck (France) Emmanuel Lebesson
Women's Singles	(Germany) Nina Mittelham	(Portugal) Fu Yu	(Czech Republic) Hana Matelová (Romania) Bernadette Szőcs

== Men's singles ==
=== Seeding ===
Players were seeded according to the latest European ranking.

1. (Sweden) Mattias Falck (semifinals)
2. (England) Liam Pitchford (quarterfinals)
3. (Germany) Patrick Franziska (champion)
4. (France) Simon Gauzy (quarterfinals)
5. (Portugal) Marcos Freitas (final)
6. (Austria) Robert Gardos (first round)
7. (Sweden) Kristian Karlsson (first round)
8. (Slovenia) Darko Jorgić (quarterfinals)
9. (Denmark) Jonathan Groth (first round)
10. (Croatia) Tomislav Pucar (first round)
11. (Germany) Ruwen Filus (quarterfinals)
12. (Slovakia) Wang Yang (first round)
13. (France) Emmanuel Lebesson (semifinals)
14. (Austria) Daniel Habesohn (first round)
15. (Croatia) Andrej Gaćina (first round)
16. (Greece) Panagiotis Gionis (first round)

=== Main draw ===
First round
1	(Sweden) Mattias Falck	11	17	14	12
12	(Slovakia) Wang Yang	7	15	12	10
15	(Croatia) Andrej Gaćina	2	3	6	11	9
8	(Slovenia) Darko Jorgić	11	11	11	8	11
7	(Sweden) Kristian Karlsson	8	6	11	6	11	5
11	(Germany) Ruwen Filus	11	11	6	11	5	11
14	(Austria) Daniel Habesohn	8	11	11	7	11	9	17
3	(Germany) Patrick Franziska	11	5	7	11	4	11	19
4	(France) Simon Gauzy	6	11	11	11	11
16	(Greece) Panagiotis Gionis	11	7	4	9	6
9	(Denmark) Jonathan Groth	13	5	11	7	7	12
5	(Portugal) Marcos Freitas	11	11	8	11	11	14
6	(Austria) Robert Gardos	8	5	11	9	11	13
13	(France) Emmanuel Lebesson	11	11	9	11	8	15
10	(Croatia) Tomislav Pucar	11	4	3	6	11	4
2	(England) Liam Pitchford	3	11	11	11	8	11

Quarterfinals
1	(Sweden) Mattias Falck	11	11	5	12	11
8	(Slovenia) Darko Jorgić	8	5	11	10	5
11	(Germany) Ruwen Filus	11	7	7	6	5
3	(Germany) Patrick Franziska	9	11	11	11	11
4	(France) Simon Gauzy	10	12	11	12	9	11	3
5	(Portugal) Marcos Freitas	12	10	13	10	11	8	11
13	(France) Emmanuel Lebesson	11	11	10	11	10	12
2	(England) Liam Pitchford	5	7	12	5	12	10

Semifinals
1	(Sweden) Mattias Falck	8	8	11	11	11	8
3	(Germany) Patrick Franziska	11	11	13	6	9	11
5	(Portugal) Marcos Freitas	11	12	13	11
13	(France) Emmanuel Lebesson	6	10	11	6

Final
3	(Germany) Patrick Franziska	12	11	11	11	11
5	(Portugal) Marcos Freitas	10	8	6	13	5

== Women's singles ==
=== Seeding ===
Players were seeded according to the latest European ranking.

1. (Austria) Sofia Polcanova (quarterfinals)
2. (Romania) Bernadette Szőcs (semifinals)
3. (Netherlands) Britt Eerland (first round)
4. (Romania) Elizabeta Samara (first round)
5. (Germany) Nina Mittelham (champion)
6. (Luxembourg) Ni Xialian (first round)
7. (Russia) Polina Mikhaylova (first round)
8. (Czech Republic) Hana Matelová (semifinals)
9. (Hungary) Georgina Póta (quarterfinals)
10. (Slovakia) Barbora Balážová (first round)
11. (Portugal) Fu Yu (final)
12. (Russia) Yana Noskova (first round)
13. (Portugal) Shao Jieni (first round)
14. (Hungary) Dora Madarász (quarterfinals)
15. (Ukraine) Ganna Gaponova (quarterfinals)
16. (Greece) Aikaterini Toliou (first round)

=== Main draw ===
First round
1	(Austria) Sofia Polcanova	11	5	6	11	11	11
13	(Portugal) Shao Jieni	7	11	11	8	7	6
10	(Slovakia) Barbora Balážová	11	9	12	10	9	11	7
5	(Germany) Nina Mittelham	7	11	10	12	11	5	11
9	(Hungary) Georgina Póta	11	13	8	11	12	11
16	(Greece) Aikaterini Toliou	6	15	11	7	10	9
8	(Czech Republic) Hana Matelová	11	11	11	12	11
4	(Romania) Elizabeta Samara	8	8	6	14	8
3	(Netherlands) Britt Eerland	11	9	12	3	6	9
14	(Hungary) Dora Madarász	6	11	10	11	11	11
11	(Portugal) Fu Yu	11	11	9	11	9	11
6	(Luxembourg) Ni Xialian	7	9	11	8	11	8
7	(Russia) Polina Mikhaylova	4	13	5	6	7
15	(Ukraine) Ganna Gaponova	11	11	11	11	11
12	(Russia) Yana Noskova	9	11	13	6	7
2	(Romania) Bernadette Szőcs	11	13	11	11	11

Quarterfinals
1	(Austria) Sofia Polcanova	3	7	11	11	8
5	(Germany) Nina Mittelham	11	11	8	13	11
9	(Hungary) Georgina Póta	11	7	12	11	10	9	7
8	(Czech Republic) Hana Matelová	7	11	10	5	12	11	11
14	(Hungary) Dora Madarász	4	8	8	12
11	(Portugal) Fu Yu	11	11	11	14
15	(Ukraine) Ganna Gaponova	4	11	2	11	9
2	(Romania) Bernadette Szőcs	11	13	11	4	11

Semifinals
5	(Germany) Nina Mittelham	11	11	11	11
8	(Czech Republic) Hana Matelová	2	4	8	8
11	(Portugal) Fu Yu	8	11	6	7	12	11	11
2	(Romania) Bernadette Szőcs	11	9	11	11	10	8	8

Final
5	(Germany) Nina Mittelham	11	8	11	11	14
11	(Portugal) Fu Yu	8	11	6	3	12

== See also ==
- 2021 European Table Tennis Championships
