= Monaco at the European Games =

- IOC code: MON
- NOC: Monégasque Olympic Committee
- Website: www.comite-olympique.mc (in French)
- Medals: Gold 0 Silver 1 Bronze 0 Total 1

European Games appearances (overview)
- 2015; 2019; 2023; 2027

Monaco participated at the inaugural edition of the European Games in 2015. However, Monaco was one of the eight nations that failed to win a medal at the inaugural European Games. Monaco however won their first ever medal in 2023.

== Medal tables ==
=== Medals by Games ===
| Games | Athletes | Gold | Silver | Bronze | Total | Rank |
| (Azerbaijan) 2015 Baku | 5 | 0 | 0 | 0 | 0 | – |
| (Belarus) 2019 Minsk | 4 | 0 | 0 | 0 | 0 | – |
| (Poland) 2023 Kraków-Małopolska | 3 | 0 | 1 | 0 | 40 | 40 |
| (Turkey) 2027 Istanbul | Future event | | | | | |
| Total | | 0 | 1 | 0 | 1 | 46 |

== List of medallists ==
| Medal | Name(s) | Games | Sport | Event |
|---|---|---|---|---|
| Silver | Xiaoxin Yang | (Poland) 2023 Krakow | Table tennis | Women's singles |

== See also ==
- Monaco at the Olympics
