= Table tennis at the 2023 European Games =

Table tennis at the European games 2024

- Venue: Hutnik Arena
- Dates: 23 June – 1 July
- Competitors: 152 from 32 nations

Table tennis at the 2023 European Games in Kraków took place from 23 June to 1 July 2023 at Hutnik Arena. The winners of the mixed doubles event qualified for the 2024 Olympic Games.

== Qualification ==
Maximum quota per NOC: 2 athletes in each singles event, 1 team (4 athletes) in each team event and 1 pair in the mixed doubles.

NOC	Men's Singles	Men's Team	Women's Singles	Women's Team	Mixed Doubles	Total Athletes
Austria	2		2	X	X	6
Belgium	2	X	2			6
Croatia	2	X	2			6
Czech Republic	2		2	X	X	6
Denmark	2	X				4
Estonia			2			2
Finland	2					2
France	2	X	2	X		8
Georgia			1			1
Germany	2	X	2	X	X	8
Great Britain	2	X	2		X	6
Greece	2		2			4
Hungary	2		2	X	X	7
Italy	2		2		X	6
Lithuania			1			1
Luxembourg	2		2	X	X	6
Moldova	2					2
Monaco			1			1
Netherlands			2			2
Norway	1		1			2
Poland	2	X	2	X	X	8
Portugal	2	X	2	X		8
Romania	2	X	2	X	X	8
San Marino	1					1
Serbia	2		2		X	4
Slovakia	2	X	2	X	X	8
Slovenia	2	X	2		X	6
Spain	2		2		X	4
Sweden	2	X	2	X	X	8
Switzerland			1			1
Turkey	1		2		X	3
Ukraine	2		2	X	X	7
32 NOCs	49	12	51	12	16	152

== Medal summary ==
Medals were awarded to 29 athletes from 7 nations.

=== Medal table ===
Rank	Nation	Gold	Silver	Bronze	Total
1	Germany	2	1	0	3
2	Romania	2	0	2	4
3	France	1	0	2	3
4	Portugal	0	1	1	2
5	Hungary	0	1	0	1
5	Monaco	0	1	0	1
5	Sweden	0	1	0	1
Totals (7 entries)		5	5	5	15

=== Medalists ===
Event	Gold	Silver	Bronze
Men's singles	Félix Lebrun; France	Marcos Freitas; Portugal	Alexis Lebrun; France
Men's team	Germany; Timo Boll; Patrick Franziska; Dimitrij Ovtcharov; Dang Qiu	Sweden; Simon Berglund; Anton Källberg; Kristian Karlsson; Truls Möregårdh	France; Can Akkuzu; Simon Gauzy; Alexis Lebrun; Félix Lebrun
Women's singles	Bernadette Szőcs; Romania	Xiaoxin Yang; Monaco	Elizabeta Samara; Romania
Women's team	Romania; Adina Diaconu; Andreea Dragoman; Elizabeta Samara; Bernadette Szőcs	Germany; Han Ying; Nina Mittelham; Shan Xiaona; Sabine Winter	Portugal; Inês Matos; Matilde Pinto; Shao Jieni; Fu Yu
Mixed doubles	Germany; Dang Qiu; Nina Mittelham	Hungary; Nándor Ecseki; Dóra Madarász	Romania; Ovidiu Ionescu; Bernadette Szőcs
