= Monaco at the 2023 European Games =

- IOC code: MON
- NOC: Monégasque Olympic Committee
- Website: www.comite-olympique.mc

in Kraków and Małopolska, Poland 21 June – 2 July 2023
- Competitors: 3 in 2 sports
- Medals Ranked 0th: Gold 0 Silver 1 Bronze 0 Total 1

European Games appearances (overview)
- 2015; 2019; 2023; 2027

Monaco competed at the 2023 European Games, in Kraków and Małopolska, Poland, from 21 June to 2 July 2023.

== Competitors ==
Sport	Men	Women	Total
Padel tennis	2	0	2
Table Tennis	0	1	1
Total	2	1	3

== Padel ==
Athletes	Event	Round of 32	Round of 16	Quarterfinal	Semi-final	Final	
Athletes	Event	Opposition Result	Opposition Result	Opposition Result	Opposition Result	Opposition Result	Rank
Benjamin Chavanis; Nicolas Fedoroff	Men's Doubles	Maszczyk; Janowicz (POL); L 0-2	did not advance				

== Table Tennis ==
Athlete	Event	Round 1	Round 2	Round 3	Round 4	Quarterfinal	Semi-final	Final / BM	
Athlete	Event	Opposition Result	Opposition Result	Opposition Result	Opposition Result	Opposition Result	Opposition Result	Opposition Result	Rank
Xiaoxin Yang	Women's singles	—	—	(Netherlands) Helle; W 4-0	(Hungary) Madarasz; W 4-0	(Portugal) Fu Yu; W 4-0	(Romania) Samara		Silver
