= 2015 European Table Tennis Championships =

- Date: 25 September – 4 October
- Location: Yekaterinburg, Russia
- Venue: Yekaterinburg-Expo
- European Table Tennis Championships

The 2015 European Table Tennis Championships were held in Yekaterinburg, Russia from 25 September to 4 October 2015. Venue for the competition is Yekaterinburg-Expo.

== Medal summary ==
=== Men's events ===
Event	Gold	Silver	Bronze
Team	Austria; Robert Gardos; Stefan Fegerl; Daniel Habesohn; Dominik Habesohn; Chen Weixing	Germany; Dimitrij Ovtcharov; Patrick Baum; Patrick Franziska; Ruwen Filus; Ricardo Walther	Belarus; Vladimir Samsonov; Evgueni Chtchetinine; Pavel Platonov; Aliaksandr Khanin; Gleb Shamruk
Team	Austria; Robert Gardos; Stefan Fegerl; Daniel Habesohn; Dominik Habesohn; Chen Weixing	Germany; Dimitrij Ovtcharov; Patrick Baum; Patrick Franziska; Ruwen Filus; Ricardo Walther	France; Simon Gauzy; Emmanuel Lebesson; Tristan Flore; Antoine Hachard; Stephane Ouaiche
Singles	Dimitrij Ovtcharov; Germany	Marcos Freitas; Portugal	Pär Gerell; Sweden
Singles	Dimitrij Ovtcharov; Germany	Marcos Freitas; Portugal	Tiago Apolónia; Portugal
Doubles	João Monteiro / Stefan Fegerl; Portugal / Austria	Robert Gardos; Daniel Habesohn; Austria	Kristian Karlsson; Mattias Karlsson; Sweden
Doubles	João Monteiro / Stefan Fegerl; Portugal / Austria	Robert Gardos; Daniel Habesohn; Austria	Alexander Shibaev; Kirill Skachkov; Russia

=== Women's events ===
Event	Gold	Silver	Bronze
Team	Germany; Petrissa Solja; Han Ying; Shan Xiaona; Sabine Winter; Irene Ivancan	Romania; Elizabeta Samara; Daniela Dodean; Bernadette Szőcs; Adina Diaconu; Cristina Hirici	Ukraine; Margaryta Pesotska; Tetyana Bilenko; Hanna Haponova
Team	Germany; Petrissa Solja; Han Ying; Shan Xiaona; Sabine Winter; Irene Ivancan	Romania; Elizabeta Samara; Daniela Dodean; Bernadette Szőcs; Adina Diaconu; Cristina Hirici	Russia; Polina Mikhaylova; Yana Noskova; Anna Tikhomirova; Maria Dolgikh; Yulia Prokhorova
Singles	Elizabeta Samara; Romania	Li Jie; Netherlands	Fu Yu; Portugal
Singles	Elizabeta Samara; Romania	Li Jie; Netherlands	Polina Mikhaylova; Russia
Doubles	Melek Hu / Shen Yanfei; Turkey / Spain	Georgina Póta / Elizabeta Samara; Hungary / Romania	Li Qian / Li Jie; Poland / Netherlands
Doubles	Melek Hu / Shen Yanfei; Turkey / Spain	Georgina Póta / Elizabeta Samara; Hungary / Romania	Han Ying / Irene Ivancan; Germany

== Medal table ==
Rank	Nation	Gold	Silver	Bronze	Total
1	Germany (GER)	2	1	1	4
2	Austria (AUT)	1.5	1	0	2.5
3	Romania (ROU)	1	1.5	0	2.5
4	Portugal (POR)	0.5	1	2	3.5
5	Spain (ESP)	0.5	0	0	0.5
5	Turkey (TUR)	0.5	0	0	0.5
7	Netherlands (NED)	0	1	0.5	1.5
8	Hungary (HUN)	0	0.5	0	0.5
9	Russia (RUS)	0	0	3	3
10	Sweden (SWE)	0	0	2	2
11	Belarus (BLR)	0	0	1	1
11	France (FRA)	0	0	1	1
11	Ukraine (UKR)	0	0	1	1
14	Poland (POL)	0	0	0.5	0.5
Totals (14 entries)		6	6	12	24
