= Monaco at the 2019 European Games =

- IOC code: MON
- NOC: Monégasque Olympic Committee
- Website: www.comite-olympique.mc

in Minsk, Belarus 21–30 June
- Competitors: 5 in 4 sports
- Medals Ranked 44th: Gold 0 Silver 0 Bronze 0 Total 0

European Games appearances (overview)
- 2015; 2019; 2023; 2027

Monaco competed at the 2019 European Games in Minsk from 21 to 30 June 2019. Monaco is represented by 5 athletes in 4 sports.

== Competitors ==
Sport	Men	Women	Total
Boxing	1	0	1
Cycling	1	0	1
Judo	2	0	2
Table tennis	0	1	1
Total	4	1	5

== Boxing ==
Men

Athlete	Event	Round of 32	Round of 16	Quarterfinals	Semifinals	Final	
Athlete	Event	Opposition Result	Opposition Result	Opposition Result	Opposition Result	Opposition Result	Rank
Hugo Micallef	69 kg	Zold (SVK); W 5–0	Messaoudi (BEL); W 3–2	McCormack (GBR); L 0–5	did not advance		

== Cycling ==
=== Road ===
Men

Athlete	Event	Time	Rank
Victor Langellotti	Road race	did not finish	
Victor Langellotti	Time trial	38:14.25	34

== Judo ==
Men

Athlete	Event	Round of 64	Round of 32	Round of 16	Quarterfinals	Semifinals	Repechage	Final / BM	
Athlete	Event	Opposition Result	Opposition Result	Opposition Result	Opposition Result	Opposition Result	Opposition Result	Opposition Result	Rank
Yann Siccardi	–60 kg	Mkheidze (FRA); L 0s2–1	did not advance						
Cédric Bessi	–73 kg	Orujov (AZE); L 0–10	did not advance						

== Table tennis ==
Athlete	Event	Round 1	Round 2	Round 3	Round 4	Quarterfinals	Semifinals	Final / BM	
Athlete	Event	Opposition Result	Opposition Result	Opposition Result	Opposition Result	Opposition Result	Opposition Result	Opposition Result	Rank
Yang Xiaoxin	Women's singles	Bye	Ho (GBR); W 4–0	Pesotska (UKR); W 4–1	Paulovich (BLR); W 4–0	Mikhailova (RUS); W 4–0	Han (GER); L 3–4	BM; Ni (LUX); L 2–4	4
