= 2026 European Table Tennis Championships – Women's doubles =

Women's doubles at the 2026 European Table Tennis Championships
- Venue: Arena Stožice
- Location: Ljubljana, Slovenia
- Dates: 13–18 October
- Competitors: 57 pairs

Medalists
gold medal	(Slovakia) Tatiana Kukulkova (Poland) Natalia Bajor
silver medal	(Poland) Zuzanna Wielgos (Poland) Anna Brzyska
bronze medal	(Romania) Bernadette Szőcs (Romania) Elizabeta Samara
bronze medal	(Germany) Annette Kaufman (Germany) Nina Mittelham

The women's doubles competition of the 2026 European Table Tennis Championships is being held from 13 to 18 October 2026.

== Format ==
The women's doubles competition features a two-stage qualification.

=== Stage 1: Qualification Knockout Stage ===
- Eligibility: All pairs seeded 17 and beyond compete in this stage.
- Match Length: Best-of-5 games.

=== Stage 2: Main Draw ===
- Composition:
  - The top 16 seeded pairs
  - The 16 qualification group winners.
- Match Length: Best-of-5 games.

== Seeds ==
- Seeding was determined by the ITTF World Ranking (Doubles Individual) released on 5 October 2026.
1. (Romania) Bernadette Szőcs / (Romania) Elizabeta Samara
2. (Germany) Nina Mittelham / (Germany) Annett Kaufmann
3. (Individual Neutral Athletes) Mariia Tailakova / (Individual Neutral Athletes) Elizabet Abraamian
4. (Romania) Andreea Dragoman / (Romania) Adina Diaconu
5. (Slovakia) Tatiana Kukulkova / (Poland) Natalia Bajor
6. (Germany) Sabine Winter / (Germany) Han Ying
7. (Italy) Gaia Monfardini / (Italy) Nicole Arlia
8. (Wales) Anna Hursey / (England) Tin-Tin Ho
9. (Serbia) Sabina Surjan / (Serbia) Izabela Lupulesku
10. (Poland) Zuzanna Wielgos / (Poland) Anna Brzyska
11. (France) Prithika Pavade / (France) Charlotte Lutz
12. (Luxembourg) Ni Xia Lian / (Luxembourg) Sarah De Nutte
13. (Croatia) Lea Rakovac / (Croatia) Hana Arapović
14. (Turkey) Ece Harac / (Turkey) Sibel Altinkaya
15. (Poland) Katarzyna Wegrzyn / (Estonia) Airi Avameri
16. (Sweden) Christina Källberg / (Sweden) Filippa Bergand

== Main draw ==
=== Final ===
Final
5	(Slovakia) Kukulkova (Poland) Bajor (gold)	3
10	(Poland) Wielgos (Poland) Brzyska (silver)	0

=== Upper Half ===
Round of 32
1	(Romania) Szőcs (Romania) Samara	3
(Slovakia) Wiltschkova (Slovakia) Labosova	1
(Turkey) Yilmaz (Slovakia) Puchovanova	0
13	(Croatia) Rakovac (Croatia) Arapović	3
12	(Luxembourg) Ni (Luxembourg) De Nutte	3
(Greece) Papadimitriou (Bulgaria) Georgieva	1
(Czech Republic) Vasendova (Czech Republic) Grofova	0
6	(Germany) Winter (Germany) Han	3
5	(Slovakia) Kukulkova (Poland) Bajor	3
(Serbia) Maksuti (Serbia) Bezeg	2
(Spain) Zhang (Spain) Rad	3
14	(Turkey) Harac (Turkey) Altinkaya	2
15	(Poland) Wegrzyn (Estonia) Avameri	2
(Portugal) Leal (Portugal) Pinto	3
(France) Yuan (France) Guo	2
3	(Individual Neutral Athletes) Tailakova (Individual Neutral Athletes) Abraamian	3

Round of 16
1	(Romania) Szőcs (Romania) Samara	3
13	(Croatia) Rakovac (Croatia) Arapović	0
12	(Luxembourg) Ni (Luxembourg) De Nutte	1
6	(Germany) Winter (Germany) Han	3
5	(Slovakia) Kukulkova (Poland) Bajor	3
(Spain) Zhang (Spain) Rad	1
(Portugal) Leal (Portugal) Pinto	0
3	(Individual Neutral Athletes) Tailakova (Individual Neutral Athletes) Abraamian	3

Quarterfinals
1	(Romania) Szőcs (Romania) Samara	3
6	(Germany) Winter (Germany) Han	1
5	(Slovakia) Kukulkova (Poland) Bajor	3
3	(Individual Neutral Athletes) Tailakova (Individual Neutral Athletes) Abraamian	0

Semifinals
1	(Romania) Szőcs (Romania) Samara (bronze)	0
5	(Slovakia) Kukulkova (Poland) Bajor	3

=== Lower Half ===
Round of 32
4	(Romania) Dragoman (Romania) Diaconu	3
(Moldova) Chiriacova (Spain) Berzosa	1
(Belgium) Van Hauwaert (Belgium) Massart	2
11	(France) Pavade (France) Lutz	3
10	(Poland) Wielgos (Poland) Brzyska	3
(Bulgaria) Yovkova (Bulgaria) Persova	1
(Austria) Skerbinz (Austria) Mischek-Colucci	2
8	(Wales) Hursey (England) Ho	3
7	(Italy) Monfardini (Italy) Arlia	3
(Slovenia) Tokic (Slovenia) Tofant	1
(Croatia) Malobabić (Croatia) Cosic	0
9	(Serbia) Surjan (Serbia) Lupulesku	3
16	(Sweden) Källberg (Sweden) Bergand	3
(Ukraine) Matiunina (Ukraine) Dymytrenko	0
(Greece) Toliou (Greece) Gerasimatou	0
2	(Germany) Mittelham (Germany) Kaufmann	3

Round of 16
4	(Romania) Dragoman (Romania) Diaconu	0
11	(France) Pavade (France) Lutz	3
10	(Poland) Wielgos (Poland) Brzyska	3
8	(Wales) Hursey (England) Ho	1
7	(Italy) Monfardini (Italy) Arlia	2
9	(Serbia) Surjan (Serbia) Lupulesku	3
16	(Sweden) Källberg (Sweden) Bergand	1
2	(Germany) Mittelham (Germany) Kaufmann	3

Quarterfinals
11	(France) Pavade (France) Lutz	2
10	(Poland) Wielgos (Poland) Brzyska	3
9	(Serbia) Surjan (Serbia) Lupulesku	1
2	(Germany) Mittelham (Germany) Kaufmann	3

Semifinals
10	(Poland) Wielgos (Poland) Brzyska	3
2	(Germany) Mittelham (Germany) Kaufmann (bronze)	2
