= Ristynės =

Lithuanian folk wrestling tradition

Ristynės pictogram.

Ristynės is a Lithuanian folk wrestling tradition.

== History ==
Ristynės was most popular between the middle of the 19th and the beginning of the 20th centuries. It is often performed at local fairs and holiday celebrations. In 2012 at Šventoji Lithuanian Wrestling Federation, Lithuanian Alysh Federation and International Federation of Associated Wrestling Styles (FILA) organized demonstration championships of ristynės. The name of ristynės mean roll and wrestle. In 2014 Vilnius hosted International Symposium of Traditional Wrestling, where wrestlers from 20 countries competed in Ristynės tournament.

== Rules ==
A wrestler puts one hand under the opponent's armpit and hold another hand over the opponent's hand. Wrestlers have to grip both hands from opponents behind and start to wrestle. The purpose is to drop opponent on its back or lift the opponent and drop on the ground. The first one to perform the winning moves three times wins.
