= Han Ying =

German table tennis player

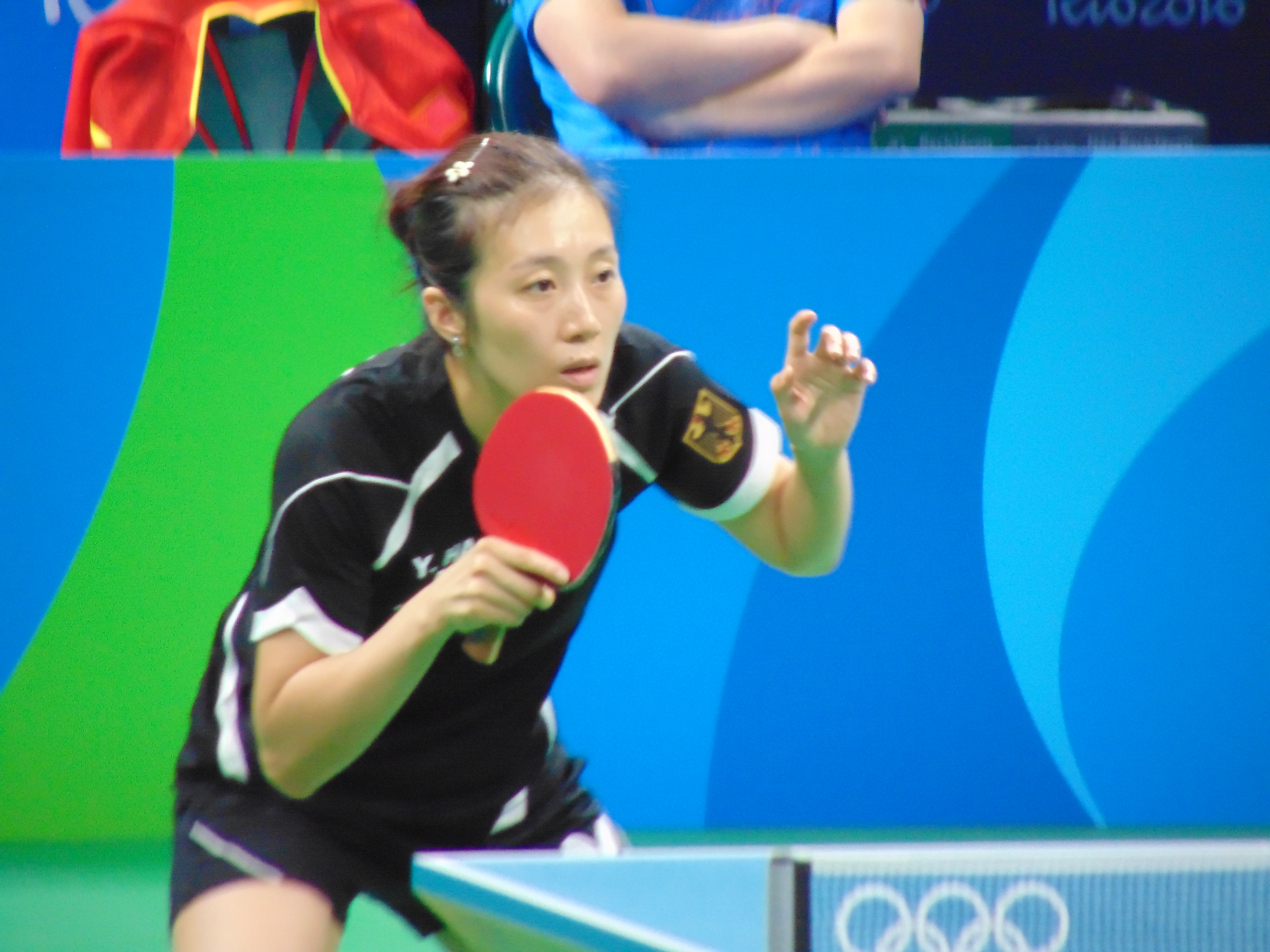
- Han Ying at the 2016 Summer Olympics

Personal information
- Nationality: Chinese (1983–2010); German (since 2010)
- Born: 29 April 1983 (age 43) Shenyang, Liaoning, China
- Height: 170 cm (5 ft 7 in)

Sport
- Sport: Table tennis
- Playing style: Right-handed, defensive
- Highest ranking: 6 (February 2017)
- Current ranking: 16 (28 September 2026)
Medal record
Women's table tennis
Representing Germany
Olympic Games
Silver medal – second place	2016 Rio de Janeiro	Team
World Championships
Bronze medal – third place	2022 Chengdu	Team
Bronze medal – third place	2026 London	Team
European Games
Gold medal – first place	2015 Baku	Team
Gold medal – first place	2019 Minsk	Team
Silver medal – second place	2019 Minsk	Singles
Silver medal – second place	2023 Kraków–Małopolska	Team
European Championships
Gold medal – first place	2013 Schwechat	Team
Gold medal – first place	2014 Lisbon	Team
Gold medal – first place	2015 Yekaterinburg	Team
Gold medal – first place	2018 Alicante	Mixed doubles
Gold medal – first place	2023 Malmö	Team
Silver medal – second place	2017 Luxembourg City	Team
Bronze medal – third place	2013 Schwechat	Singles
Bronze medal – third place	2015 Yekaterinburg	Doubles
Europe Top-16
Gold medal – first place	2022 Montreux	Singles
Gold medal – first place	2023 Montreux	Singles
Gold medal – first place	2025 Montreux	Singles
Bronze medal – third place	2026 Montreux	Singles

Han Ying (Chinese: 韩莹; born 29 April 1983) is a female table tennis player representing Germany since 2010. A specialist in defensive chopping, a style in decline ever since the mid-1990s, she is one of a few surviving defensive players active at the ITTF World Tour level as of 2021.

Her most important achievement are the Olympic silver medal in women's team in 2016 and the fourth place in the same event in 2020. Other major awards include the second place in the 2016 World Tour Grand Finals and the fourth place in the 2020 Women's World Cup.

== Career ==
=== Childhood training ===
Han was born in Shenyang, Liaoning, China. In her childhood, she played as an attacker with little progress. In an effort to qualify for the top team in Shenyang, her father convinced her to switch to a defensive chopper. She plays defensively ever since.

She left China at the age of 19 as her style was losing popularity in China. According to her, the China national table tennis team only had three spots reserved for defenders. These defenders almost have no opportunity to play in international tournaments, instead, they serve as internal training partners for the Chinese attackers.

=== Breakthrough in Germany ===
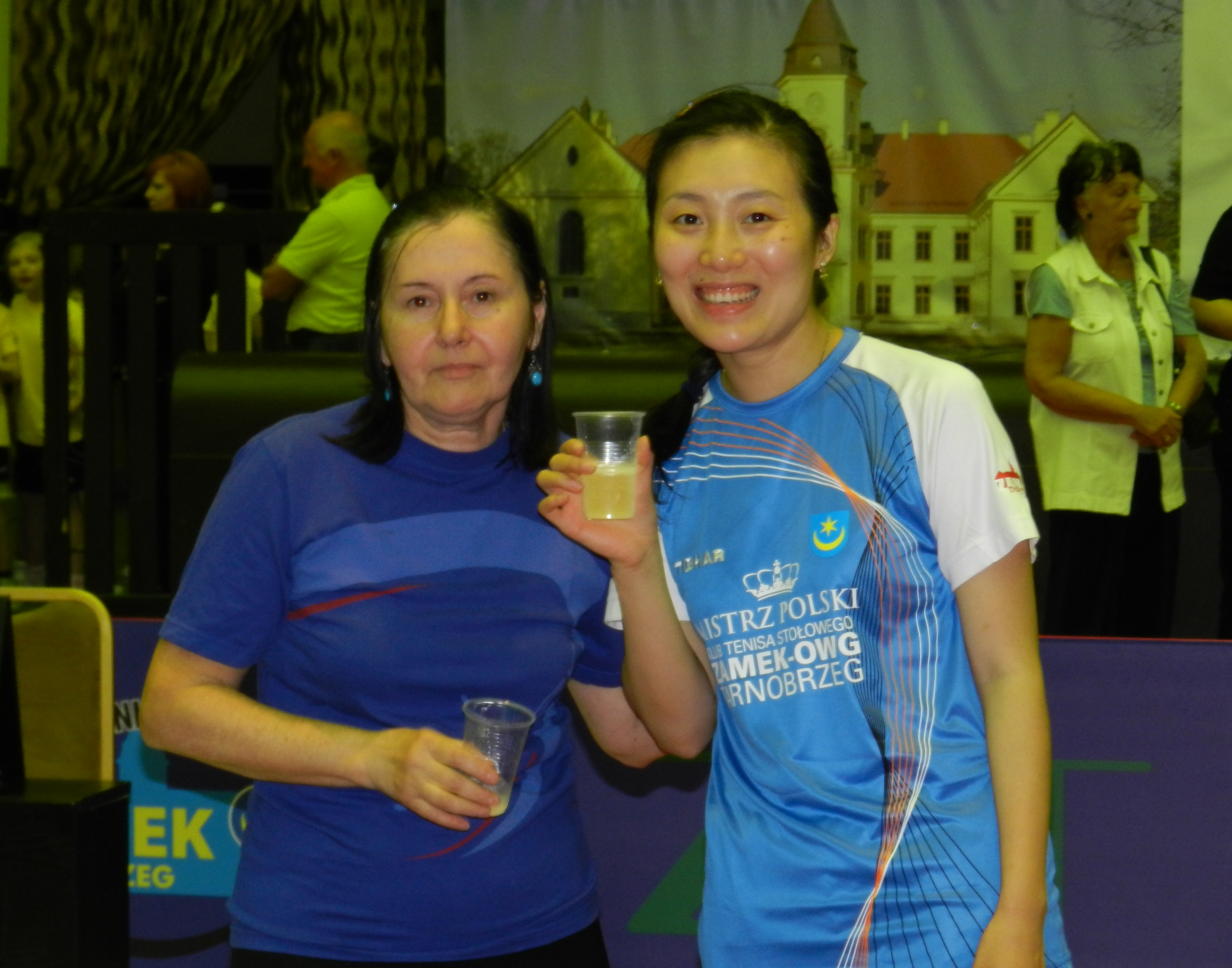
Han in 2013

Han played for the German club Turnverein Busenbach from 2002 to 2005. She transferred to another German club, MTV Tostedt, from 2005 to 2012.

She became a naturalized German citizen in 2010. She made her first breakthrough in March 2011 in the German Table Tennis Championship, the most important domestic tournament, which she claimed third in singles and she won the women doubles with Irene Ivancan. In December 2011 she won the singles in the Bundesranglistenturnier, the second most important domestic tournament.

She took a break from her career as she gave birth in October 2012. Since April 2013, she relocated to Düsseldorf and played for the Polish club KTS Tarnobrzeg.

=== Major competitions ===
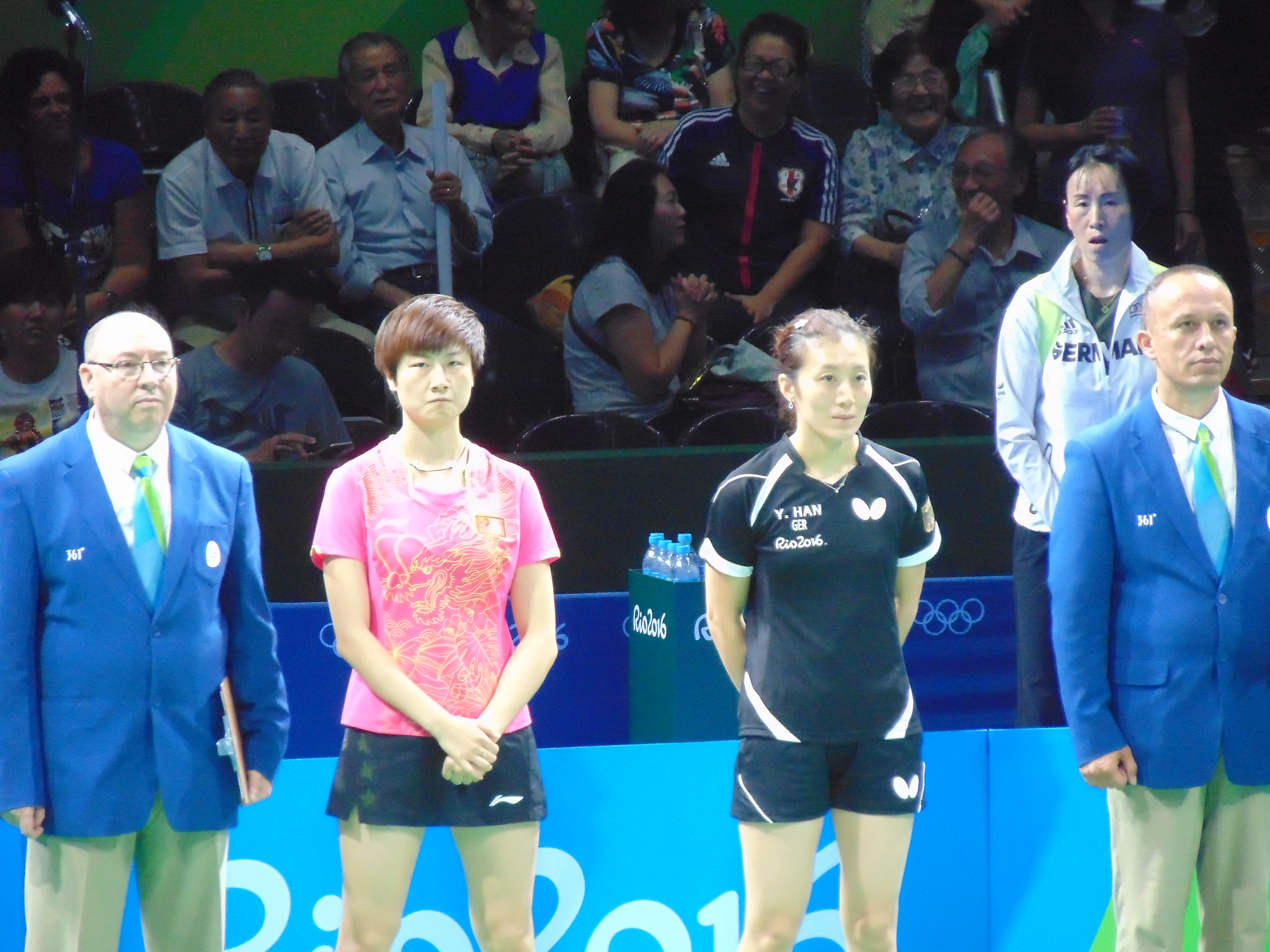
Han and Ding Ning before their singles quarterfinal in the 2016 Olympics.

Han debuted in the Olympics at the age of 33. As the fifth seed in the singles in the 2016 Olympics, she was defeated 0–4 in the quarterfinal by Ding Ning, the eventual gold medalist. In the women's team, she helped Germany to defeat Japan in the semifinal before losing to China to claim an Olympic silver medal. In the team semifinal, she lost 2–3 to Kasumi Ishikawa but she recovered to defeat Ai Fukuhara 3–2. In the team final she lost 0–3 to Li Xiaoxia.

In the 2016 ITTF World Tour Grand Finals, she claimed the second place by beating Mima Ito 4–2, Miu Hirano 4–0 and losing to Zhu Yuling 0–4.

In the 2020 ITTF Women's World Cup, she claimed the fourth place by beating Cheng I-ching 4–2, losing to Chen Meng 3–4 and losing to Mima Ito 0–4.

In the 2020 Olympics, she reached quarterfinal of the women's singles by beating Feng Tianwei 4–1 and losing to Sun Yingsha 0–4.

== Personal life ==
Han married Yang Lei, a German table tennis player from China, in 2006. In 2012, she gave birth to her daughter. Han and her family currently reside in Düsseldorf.

== Finals ==
=== Women's singles ===
Result	Year	Tournament	Opponent	Score	Ref
Winner	2014	ITTF World Tour, Korea Open	(Singapore) Feng Tianwei	4–0	
Runner-up	2015	ITTF World Tour, Qatar Open	(Romania) Elizabeta Samara	0–4	
Winner	2015	ITTF World Tour, Austrian Open	(Chinese Taipei) Cheng I-ching	4–0	
Runner-up	2016	ITTF World Tour Grand Finals	(China) Zhu Yuling	0–4	
Runner-up	2019	European Games	(Portugal) Fu Yu	2–4	
Winner	2022	Europe Top-16	(Russia) Polina Mikhailova	4–0	
Runner-up	2022	WTT Star Contender Doha	(Japan) Miyuu Kihara	3–4	
Winner	2023	Europe Top-16	(Austria) Sofia Polcanova	4–1	
Runner-up	2023	WTT Contender Antalya	(Japan) Hina Hayata	0–4	
Winner	2025	Europe Top-16	(Romania) Elizabeta Samara	3–2	

=== Women's doubles ===
Result	Year	Tournament	Partner	Opponent	Score	Ref
Runner-up	2014	ITTF World Tour, Kuwait Open	Irene Ivancan	(China) Ding Ning / Zhu Yuling	0–3	
Runner-up	2016	ITTF World Tour, German Open	Irene Ivancan	(South Korea) Jeon Ji-hee / Yang Ha-eun	1–3	

=== Mixed doubles ===
Result	Year	Tournament	Partner	Opponent	Score	Ref
Winner	2018	European Championships	Ruwen Filus	(Austria) Stefan Fegerl / Sofia Polcanova	3–2	
