= Nathalie Marchetti =

Belgian table tennis player

Personal information
- Nationality: Belgian
- Born: 10 September 1996 (age 29) Charleroi

Sport
- Sport: Table tennis

Nathalie Marchetti (born 10 September 1996) is a Belgian table tennis player. Her highest career ITTF ranking was 138.

Nathalie Marchetti is holding seven woman single titles in Master Belgian National Championship (2013, 2014, 2015, 2022, 2024, 2025 and 2026).

2023 undercontract with DJK Offenburg TishTennis in Bundesliga

2025 playing for DëschTennis Frënn Bartreng (Luxembourg)

Education - BAC - Coach Sportif
