= Solomiya Brateyko =

Ukrainian table tennis player

Personal information
- Nationality: Ukrainian
- Born: 24 February 1999 (age 26)

Sport
- Sport: Table tennis

Solomiya Brateyko (born 24 February 1999) is a Ukrainian table tennis player. Her highest career ITTF ranking was 96.
