= Elizabeta Samara =

Romanian table tennis player

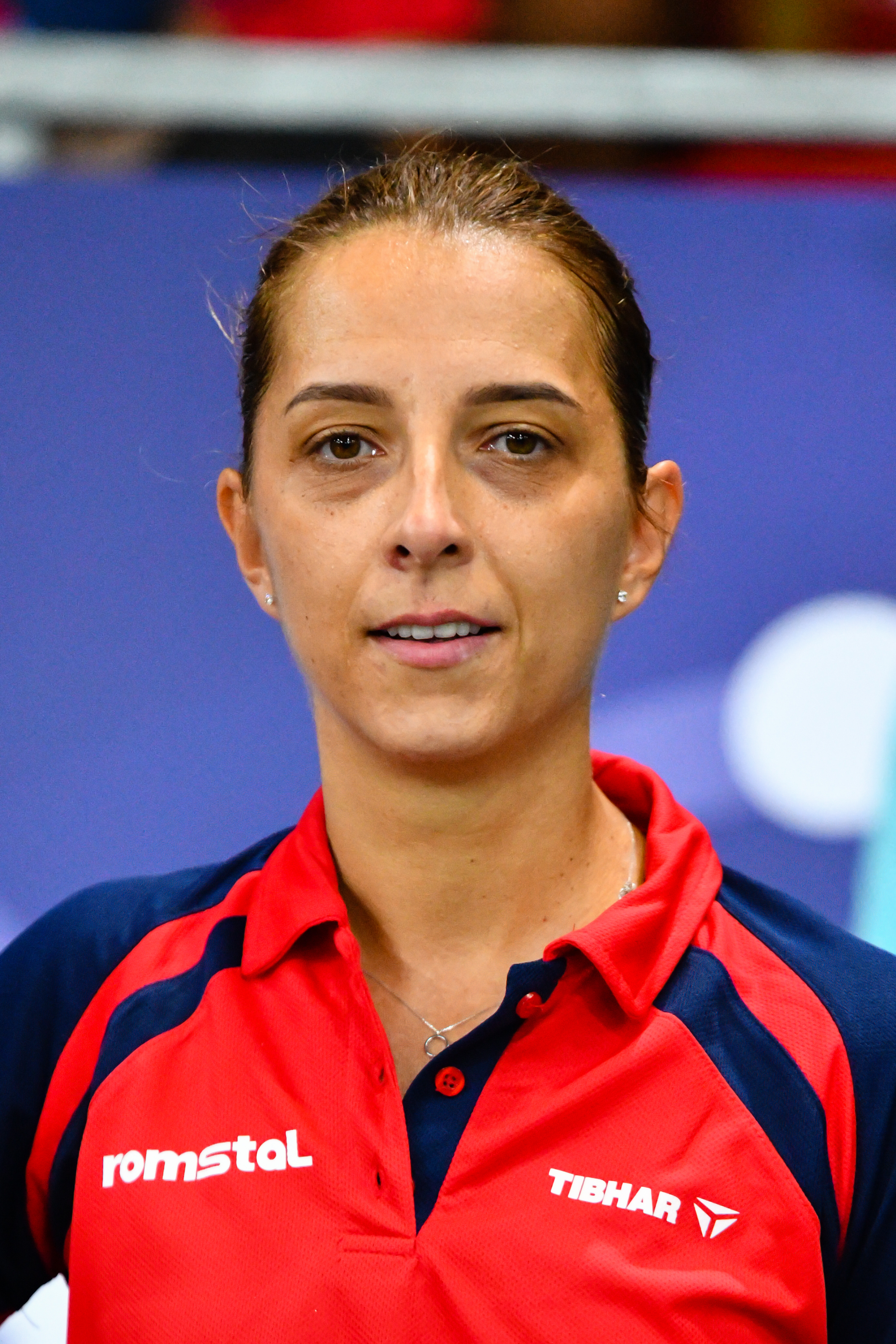

Personal information
- Born: 15 April 1989 (age 37) Constanța, Romania
- Height: 1.71 m (5 ft 7 in)

Sport
- Sport: Table tennis
- Club: CSA Steaua București
- Playing style: Left-handed, shakehand
- Equipment: Butterfly, Jun Mizutani ZLC
- Highest ranking: 13 (September 2014)
- Current ranking: 38 (28 September 2026)
Medal record
Women's table tennis
Representing Romania
World Championships
Bronze medal – third place	2026 London	Team
World Cup
Silver medal – second place	2012 Huangshi	Singles
European Games
Gold medal – first place	2023 Kraków–Małopolska	Team
Silver medal – second place	2019 Minsk	Team
Bronze medal – third place	2023 Kraków–Małopolska	Singles
European Championships
Gold medal – first place	2005 Aarhus	Team
Gold medal – first place	2009 Stuttgart	Doubles
Gold medal – first place	2011 Istanbul	Mixed Doubles
Gold medal – first place	2012 Herning	Doubles
Gold medal – first place	2012 Buzău	Mixed Doubles
Gold medal – first place	2015 Yekaterinburg	Singles
Gold medal – first place	2017 Luxembourg City	Team
Gold medal – first place	2019 Nantes	Team
Silver medal – second place	2010 Ostrava	Team
Silver medal – second place	2011 Gdansk-Sopot	Doubles
Silver medal – second place	2011 Gdansk-Sopot	Team
Silver medal – second place	2013 Schwechat	Team
Silver medal – second place	2015 Yekaterinburg	Doubles
Silver medal – second place	2015 Yekaterinburg	Team
Silver medal – second place	2021 Cluj-Napoca	Team
Silver medal – second place	2022 Munich	Doubles
Silver medal – second place	2023 Malmö	Team
Silver medal – second place	2025 Zadar	Team
Bronze medal – third place	2008 St. Petersburg	Team
Bronze medal – third place	2009 Subotica	Mixed Doubles
Bronze medal – third place	2010 Ostrava	Doubles
Bronze medal – third place	2016 Budapest	Singles
Bronze medal – third place	2016 Budapest	Doubles
Bronze medal – third place	2020 Warsaw	Singles
Bronze medal – third place	2026 Ljubljana	Doubles
Europe Top-16
Silver medal – second place	2025 Montreux	Singles
Bronze medal – third place	2018 Montreux	Singles

Elizabeta Samara (born 15 April 1989) is a professional Romanian table tennis player. She won European titles in singles, doubles and team events at the European Championships and has represented Romania four times at the Summer Olympics.

Samara had represented different teams in club competitions, including Turkish club Fenerbahçe SK and Romanian CSA Steaua București. On 26 July 2022, she agreed on terms with Greek club Panathinaikos.

== Personal life ==
Samara is an ethnic Aromanian, and was born in a family of Aromanians.

== Singles titles ==
Year	Tournament	Final opponent	Score	Ref
2013	ITTF World Tour, Americas, Brazil Open	(India) Ankita Das	4–2	
2014	ITTF World Tour, Czech Open	(Japan) Ai Fukuhara	4–3	
2015	ITTF World Tour, Qatar Open	(Germany) Han Ying	4–0	
2015	European Championships	(Netherlands) Li Jie	4–3	
