= 2023 European Games =

3rd edition of the European Games

III European Games
- Logo
- Host city: Kraków and Małopolska, Poland
- Motto: We are unity (Polish: Jesteśmy jednością)
- Nations: 48
- Athletes: 6,857
- Events: 254 in 29 sports
- Opening: 21 June 2023
- Closing: 2 July 2023
- Opened by: President Andrzej Duda
- Torch lighter: Anita Włodarczyk; Marcin Oleksy and Janusz Pyciak-Peciak
- Main venue: Henryk Reyman Stadium
- Website: 2023 European Games

The 3rd European Games (Polish: III Igrzyska Europejskie, Igrzyska Europejskie 2023), also known as the 2023 European Games or Kraków-Małopolska 2023, was an international multi-sport event held from 21 June to 2 July 2023 in Kraków and Małopolska, Poland. It was the first time that Poland hosted the European Games. All Olympic sports held at the European Games provided qualification opportunities for the 2024 Summer Olympics in Paris, France.

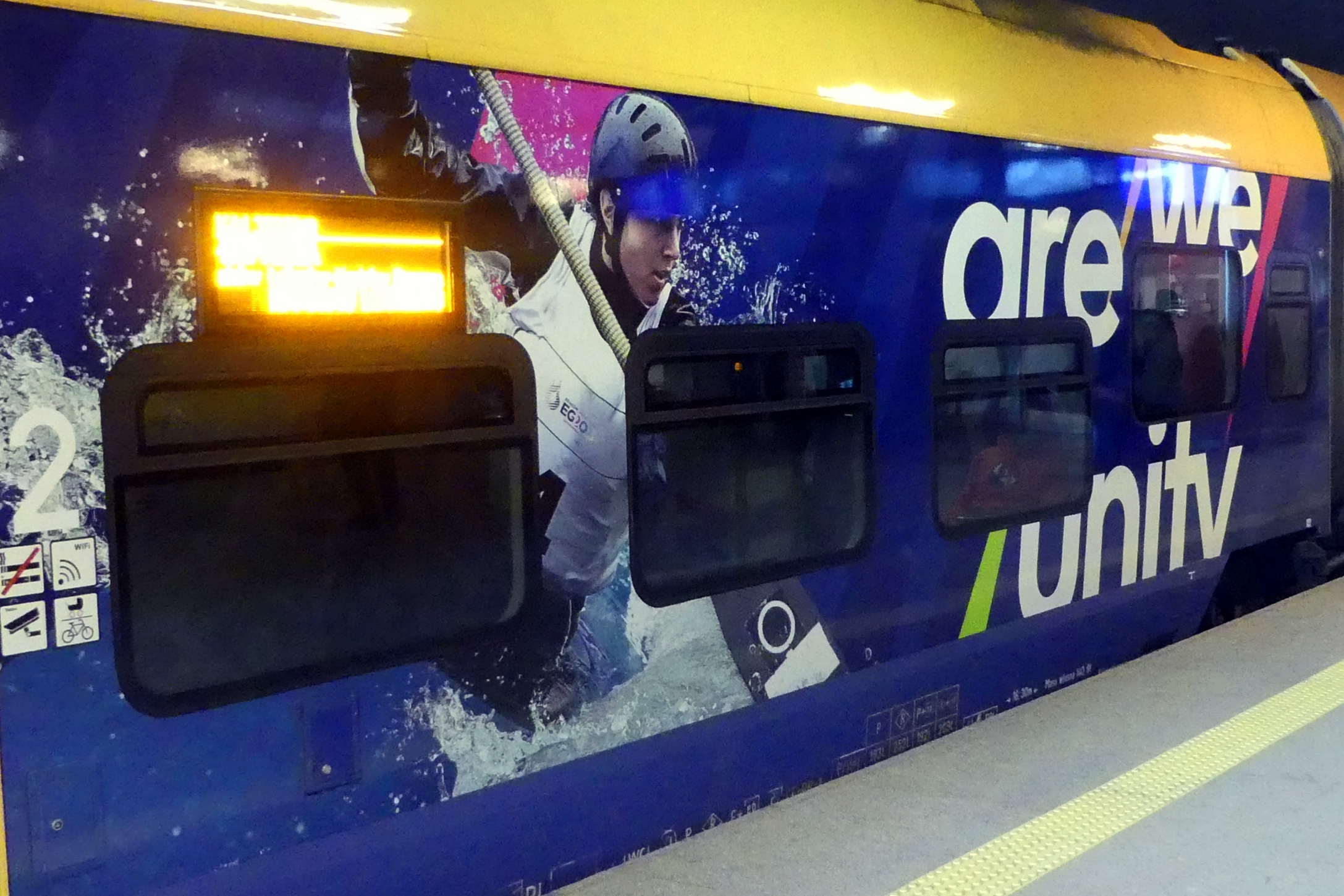
"We are unity" – slogan on a train in Kraków

== Host selection ==
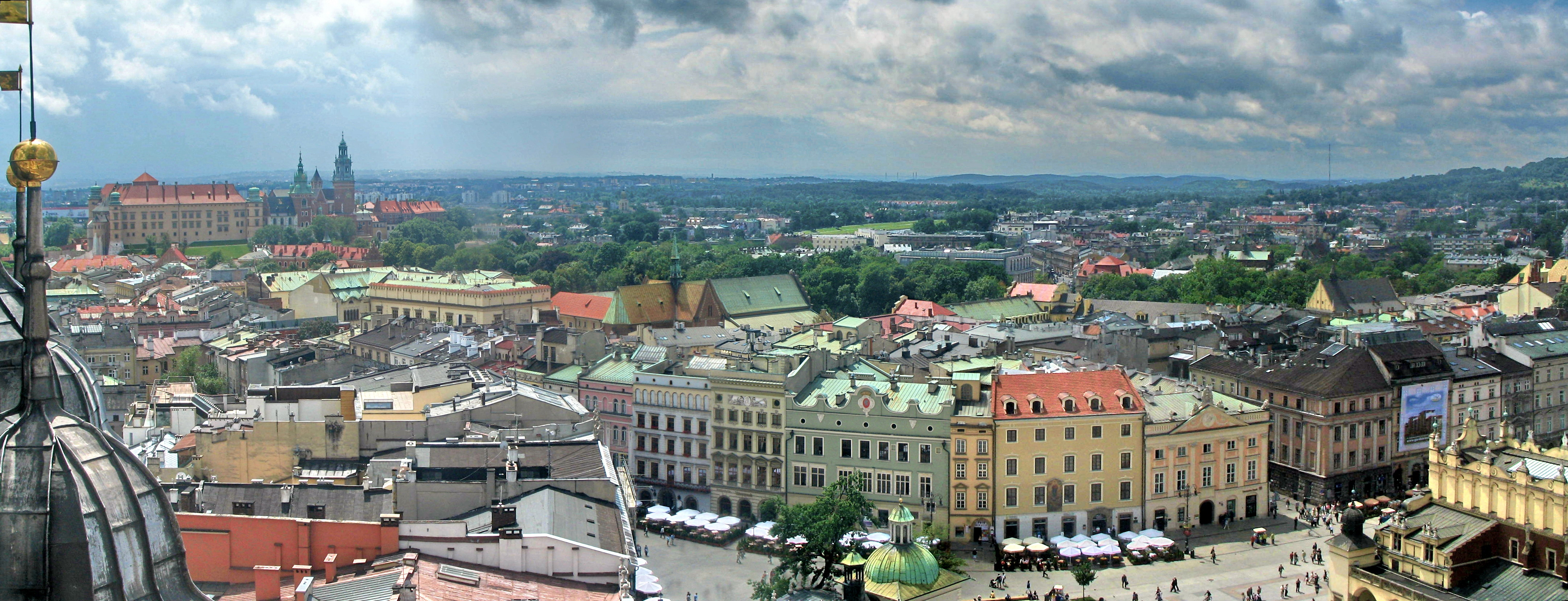
Kraków was selected as the host city of the 2023 European Games

At the time of the 2015 European Games, the city of Manchester, United Kingdom expressed its wish to host the 2023 Games. No further interest was expressed since after the 2018 European Championships were awarded to Glasgow, Scotland and the 2022 Commonwealth Games were awarded to Birmingham, England.

In May 2018, the European Olympic Committees (EOC) asserted that the bidding process for the 2023 Games would be open to joint bids from multiple countries.

The EOC launched the bid process on 20 September 2018 after a meeting of the constituent National Olympic Committees in Stockholm. Following the approval of the Bid Document, it was sent to the 50 NOCs in Europe alongside a letter from EOC President Janez Kocijančič inviting applications. The application stage was set to close on 28 February 2019.

In January 2019, Marcin Krupa, the mayor of Katowice, Poland, announced the city's interest hosting the Games, becoming the first candidate city. Soon after, Kazan, the capital of Tatarstan, Russia expressed its interest in hosting the 2023 Games and its intention to submit an application to the EOC. Its bid would be made attractive by the fact the city built much sporting infrastructure when hosting the 2013 Summer Universiade and the 2015 FINA World Aquatics Championships and that a Russian bid has been supported by premier Vladimir Putin.

In February 2019, the application deadline was extended by two months, until 30 April, due to "strong interest from across the continent". In May 2019, after the extended deadline had passed, the EOC again postponed the deadline, this time until the 31 May. No reason was given for the second extension.

In May 2019, the Polish Olympic Committee announced that Kraków would replace Katowice as the Polish bid for the Games following the withdrawal of its bid for the 2022 Winter Olympics and the waning interest in Katowice. The same month, EOC President Janez Kocijančič reiterated his expectation that the host for the 2023 Games would be chosen before the start of the 2019 European Games in Minsk on the 21 June 2019.

After the deadline for bid submission passed on the 31 May 2019, the European Olympic Committees confirmed that only one formal bid had been completed, that of Kraków in collaboration with the province Małopolska. The mayor of Kraków, Jacek Majchrowski, had previously said that the city might decline to run the Games without support from regional and national government.

The official election of the European Games 2023 host took place at an EOC General Assembly in Minsk on 22 June 2019 where it was unanimously decided that Kraków and the surrounding Lesser Poland region would hold the Games. The vote was by a show of hands. The contract with the host city was signed on 17 May 2022.

== Organisation ==
On 28 June 2019, six days after Kraków was awarded the Games, the EOC confirmed it had signed a letter of intent with the European Union of Gymnastics to include gymnastics in the upcoming Games. In July 2019, Hasan Arat, the vice-president of the Turkish Olympic Committee, was named chair of the EOC's Co-ordination Commission for the 2023 Games. He said he was "honoured and humbled by the decision".

In October the same year, both the city of Kraków and the Małopolska region signed a letter of intent confirming their joint commitment to the hosting of the Games. In March 2020, Kraków's mayor Jacek Majchrowski warned of cuts to the city budget and impacts on the tourism industry due to coronavirus which could impact the success of the Games.

=== Funding ===
In February 2021, the Games faced a funding deadlock when the city of Kraków said it needed financial guarantees from the Polish government in order to proceed with the signing of the host city contract. A spokesperson of the office of the mayor of Kraków, Jacek Majchrowski, said that the city had agreed to host the Games "only on condition that the government subsidised the necessary infrastructure". Government organisers blamed the city's leadership, with Jacek Sasin saying that "Kraków is the organiser of the Games" and that the government is "ready" to support it. Sasin said that the government would commit to sharing funding, but only after Kraków signed the host city contract. However, Majchrowski said that he would not sign the agreement until the government has introduced legislation supporting the event's organisation, leading to suggestions that Katowice, the original bid city, and the Silesia region could end up hosting the Games. In a statement, the EOC said they were "working closely with the organisers" and remained "confident" that Kraków would sign the host city contract.

In early March 2021, the EOC entered into talks with Silesian officials to explore the possibility of the region co-hosting the event. Kraków and the Polish government were reported to have come to an agreement over funding by the end of March 2021.

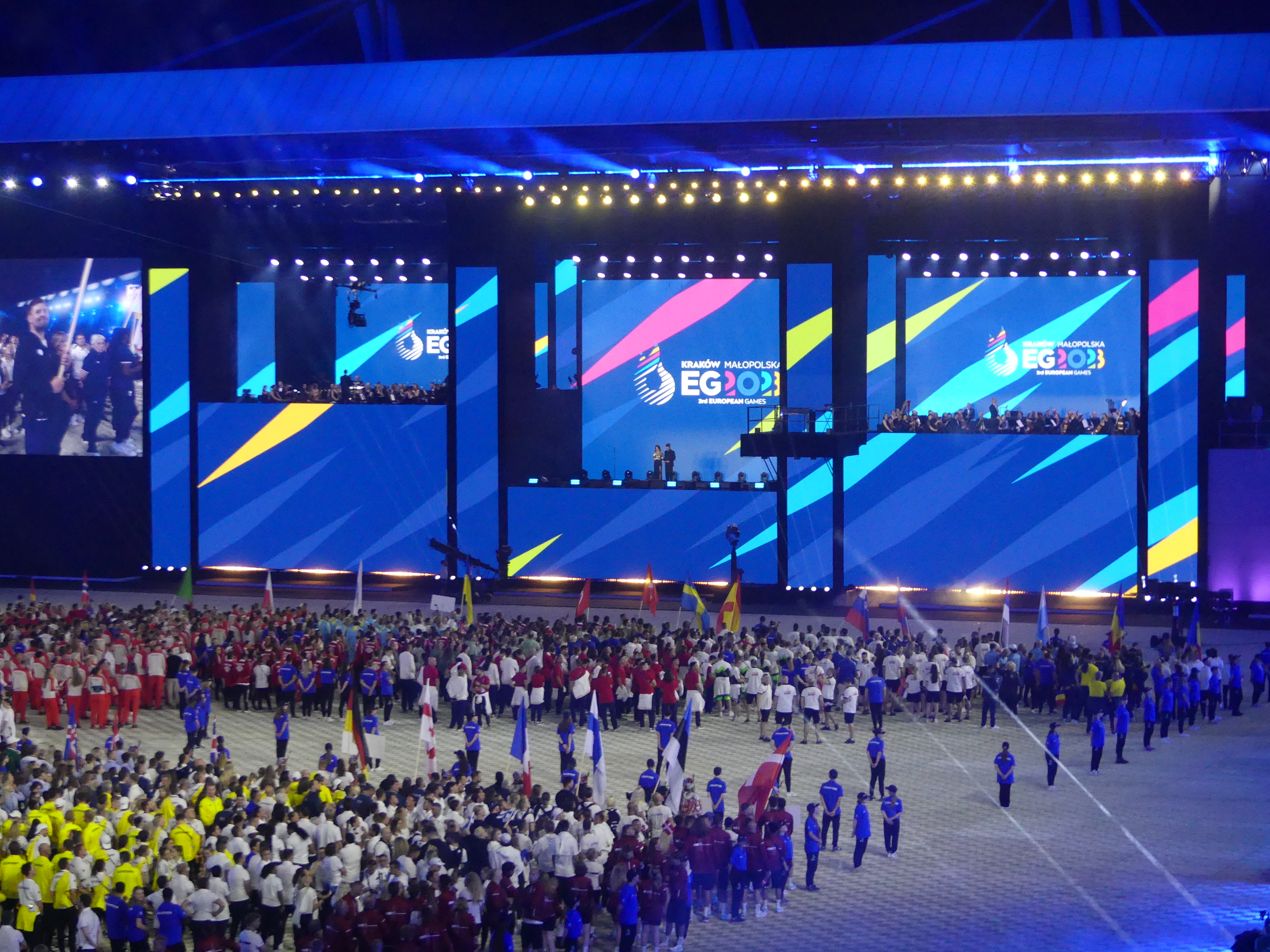
The opening ceremony in Kraków

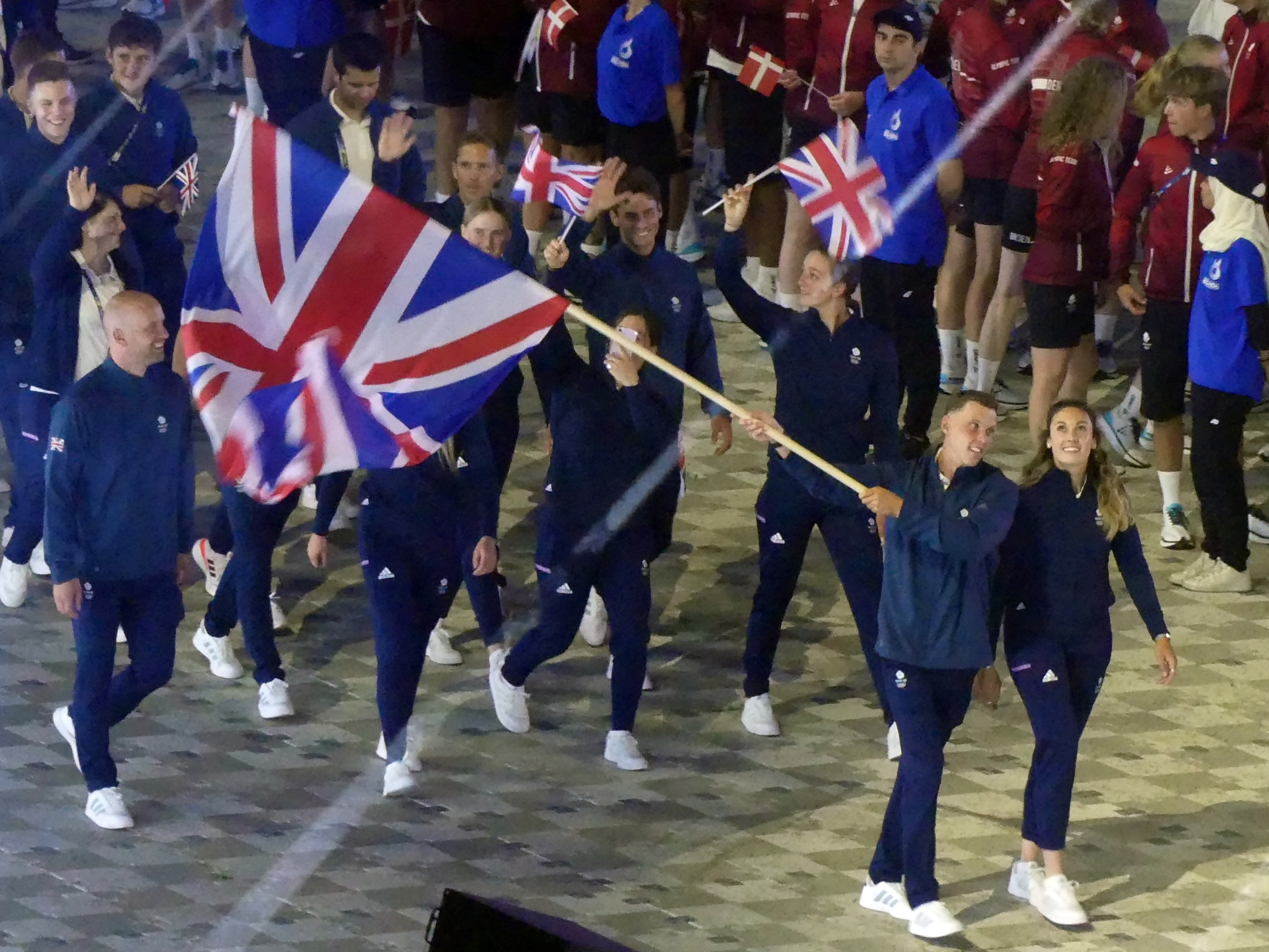
The Great Britain team at the European Games opening ceremony in Kraków

== Opening ceremony ==
The opening ceremony was held at Henryk Reyman Municipal Stadium and ran from 20:30 to 23:45 CEST.

Order	Nation	Flag bearer	Sport/Function
1	Greece	Elina Tzengko	Athletics
2	Albania	Alvin Karaqi; Ornela Mahmutaj	Karate; Team official
3	Andorra	Nana Linan	Taekwondo
4	Armenia	Gayane Chiloyan; Levon Aghasyan	Athletics
5	Austria	Sofia Polcanova; Lukas Weißhaidinger	Table tennis Athletics
6	Azerbaijan	Yaylagul Ramazanova; Barat Guliyev	Archery; Fencing
7	Belgium	Camille Laus; Kevin Borlée	Athletics
8	Bosnia and Herzegovina	Ada Avdagić; Nedžad Husić	Taekwondo
9	Bulgaria	Angel Kodinov; Yuliya Keremidchieva	Canoeing; Sport climbing
10	Croatia	Nikolina Ćaćić; Matej Nevešćanin	Boxing; Diving
11	Cyprus	Constantina Nicolaou; Christos Achilléos	Shooting; Taekwondo
12	Czech Republic	Iveta Miculyčová; Jan Kříž	Cycling; Sport climbing
13	Denmark	Line Gyldenløve Kristensen; Jonathan Groth	Beach handball Table tennis
14	Estonia	Annika Koster; Joosep Karlson	3x3 basketball Canoeing
15	Finland	Netta Malinen; Antti Tekoniemi	Canoeing; Archery
16	France	Marie Mané; Jean-Charles Valladont	3x3 basketball Archery
17	Georgia	Tsiko Putkaradze; Zaza Nadiradze	Archery; Canoeing
18	Germany	Isabel Kattner; Max Rendschmidt	Beach handball Canoeing
19	Great Britain	Abbie Brown; Joe Clarke	Rugby sevens Canoeing
20	Hungary	Dóra Madarász; Ádám Varga	Table tennis Canoeing
21	Iceland	Marín Aníta Hilmarsdóttir; Ingibjörg Erla Grétarsdóttir	Archery; Taekwondo
22	Ireland	Sarah Lavin; Liam Jegou	Athletics; Canoeing
23	Israel	Lonah Chemtai Salpeter; Joaquin Szuchman	Athletics; 3x3 basketball
24	Italy	Odette Giuffrida; Mauro Nespoli	Judo; Archery
25	Kosovo	Donjeta Sadiku; Muhamet Ramadani	Boxing; Athletics
26	Latvia	Inese Tarvida; Roberts Akmens	Taekwondo; Canoeing
27	Liechtenstein	Nadina Klauser; Matthias Verling	Artistic swimming Athletics
28	Lithuania	Henrikas Žustautas; Kamilė Nacickaitė	Canoeing; 3x3 basketball
29	Luxembourg	Ni Xialian; Flavio Giannotte	Table tennis Fencing
30	Malta	Elaine Genovese; Matthew Galea Soler	Tennis; Athletics
31	Monaco	Xiaoxin Yang; Nicolas Fedoroff	Table tennis Padel
32	Montenegro	Bojana Gojković; Danijel Furtula	Boxing; Athletics
33	Netherlands	Isabel Barnard; Sheyi Adetunji	Beach handball 3x3 basketball
34	Norway	Elisabeth Hammerstad; Borgar Haug	Beach handball Table tennis
35	North Macedonia	Milijana Ristikj; Emil Pavlov	Karate
36	Portugal	Fu Yu; Fernando Pimenta	Table tennis Canoeing
37	Moldova	Zalina Merghieva; Serghei Tarnovschi	Athletics; Canoeing
38	Romania	Bianca Ghelber; Cătălin Chirilă	Athletics; Canoeing
39	San Marino	Alessandra Perilli; Mattias Mongiusti	Shooting; Table tennis
40	Serbia	Milica Novaković; Marko Novaković	Canoeing
41	Slovakia	Barbora Balážová; Miroslav Duchoň	Table tennis Archery
42	Slovenia	Ana Tofant; Den Habjan Malavašič	Table tennis Archery
43	Spain	Patricia Encinas Guardado; Carlos Arévalo	Beach handball Canoeing
44	Sweden	Petter Menning; Linnea Stensils	Canoeing
45	Switzerland	Nikita Ducarroz; Westher Molteni	Cycling; 3x3 basketball
46	Turkey	Merve Dinçel; Hakan Reçber	Taekwondo
47	Ukraine	Anastasia Pavlova; Andrii Rybachok	Archery; Canoeing
48	EOC Refugee Team	Cindy Ngamba; Kasra Mehdipournejad	Boxing; Taekwondo
49	Poland	Sandra Drabik; Łukasz Niedzielak	Boxing; Beach handball

== Games ==
=== Sports ===
The following competitions took place:

2023 European Games
- Archery (8)
- Artistic swimming (8)
- Athletics (38)
- Badminton (5)
- Basketball (2)
- Beach handball (2)
- Beach soccer (2)
- Boxing (13)
- Breaking (2)
- Canoe slalom (10)
- Canoe sprint (16)
- Cycling (4)
- Diving (13)
- Fencing (12)
- Judo (1)
- Karate (12)
- Kickboxing (16)
- Modern pentathlon (5)
- Muaythai (10)
- Padel (3)
- Rugby sevens (2)
- Shooting (30)
- Ski jumping (5)
- Sport climbing (6)
- Table tennis (5)
- Taekwondo (16)
- Teqball (5)
- Triathlon (3)

In addition, the following sports as 'side events' (demonstration sports) were included on the official program:

Side Events at the 2023 European Games
- Mountain running (2)
- Motor racing (details)
- Chess (1)
- Amputee football (details)
- Sumo (12)
- Orienteering (2)
- Traditional Martial Arts (4) (details)

Traditional Martial Arts:

- Kurash
- Ukrainian Traditional Belt Wrestling
- Lithuanian Traditional Wrestling “Ristynės”
- Ukrainian Wrestling “SPAS”

An Esports European Games in Katowice, recognised by the EOC, was also held alongside the Games, but did not form part of the Kraków 2023 program.

=== Calendar ===
OC	Opening ceremony	●	Event competitions	1	Event finals	CC	Closing ceremony

June/July		20th Tue	21st Wed	22nd Thu	23rd Fri	24th Sat	25th Sun	26th Mon	27th Tue	28th Wed	29th Thu	30th Fri	1st Sat	2nd Sun	Total events
Ceremonies			OC											CC	
Aquatics	Artistic swimming		●	2	2	3	1								8
Aquatics	Diving			1	2	2	2	2	2	2					13
Archery					●	2	2	●	●	2	2				8
Athletics		●	●	●	12	13	13								38
Badminton								●	●	●	●	●	2	3	5
Basketball (3x3)			●	●	●	2									2
Beach handball		●	●	2											2
Beach soccer									●	●	●	●	2		2
Boxing					●	●	●	●	●	●		●	7	6	13
Breaking								●	2						2
Canoeing	Slalom										2	2	2	4	10
Canoeing	Sprint		●	4	6	6									16
Cycling	BMX		●	2											2
Cycling	Mountain biking						2								2
Fencing							2	2	2	2	2	2			12
Judo													1		1
Karate				6	6										12
Kickboxing												●	●	16	16
Modern pentathlon							●	●	●	●	1		4		5
Muaythai							●	●	10						10
Padel			●	●	●	●	3								3
Rugby sevens							●	●	2						2
Shooting				3	3	4	3	3	3	2	2	3	2	2	30
Ski jumping									1		2	1	1		5
Sport climbing				1	1	2	2								6
Table tennis					●	●	●	1	2	●	●	●	2		5
Taekwondo					4	4	4	4							16
Teqball										●	2	1	2		5
Triathlon									1	1			1		3
Daily medal events				21	36	38	34	12	25	9	13	9	26	31	254
Cumulative total				21	57	95	129	141	166	175	188	197	223	254	254
June/July		20th Tue	21st Wed	22nd Thu	23rd Fri	24th Sat	25th Sun	26th Mon	27th Tue	28th Wed	29th Thu	30th Fri	1st Sat	2nd Sun	Total events

== Venues ==
Events took place in the city of Kraków, the surrounding Lesser Poland Voivodeship region and in Bielsko-Biała and Chorzów in the neighbouring Silesian Voivodeship.

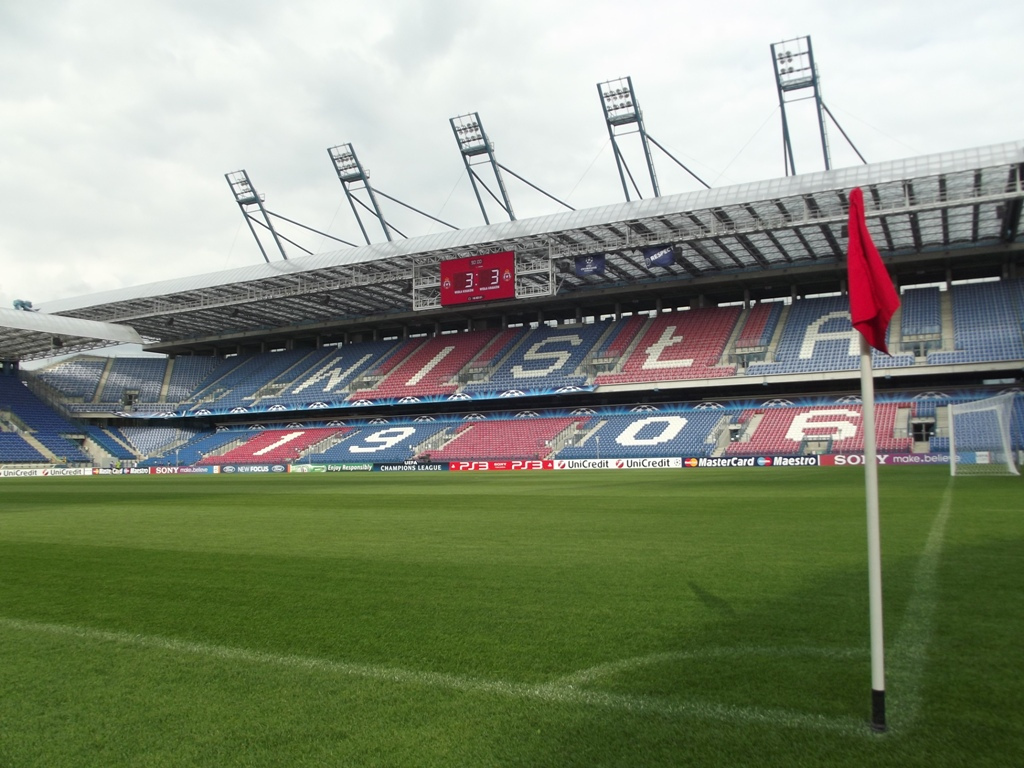
Henryk Reyman Municipal Stadium in Kraków hosted the opening and closing ceremonies

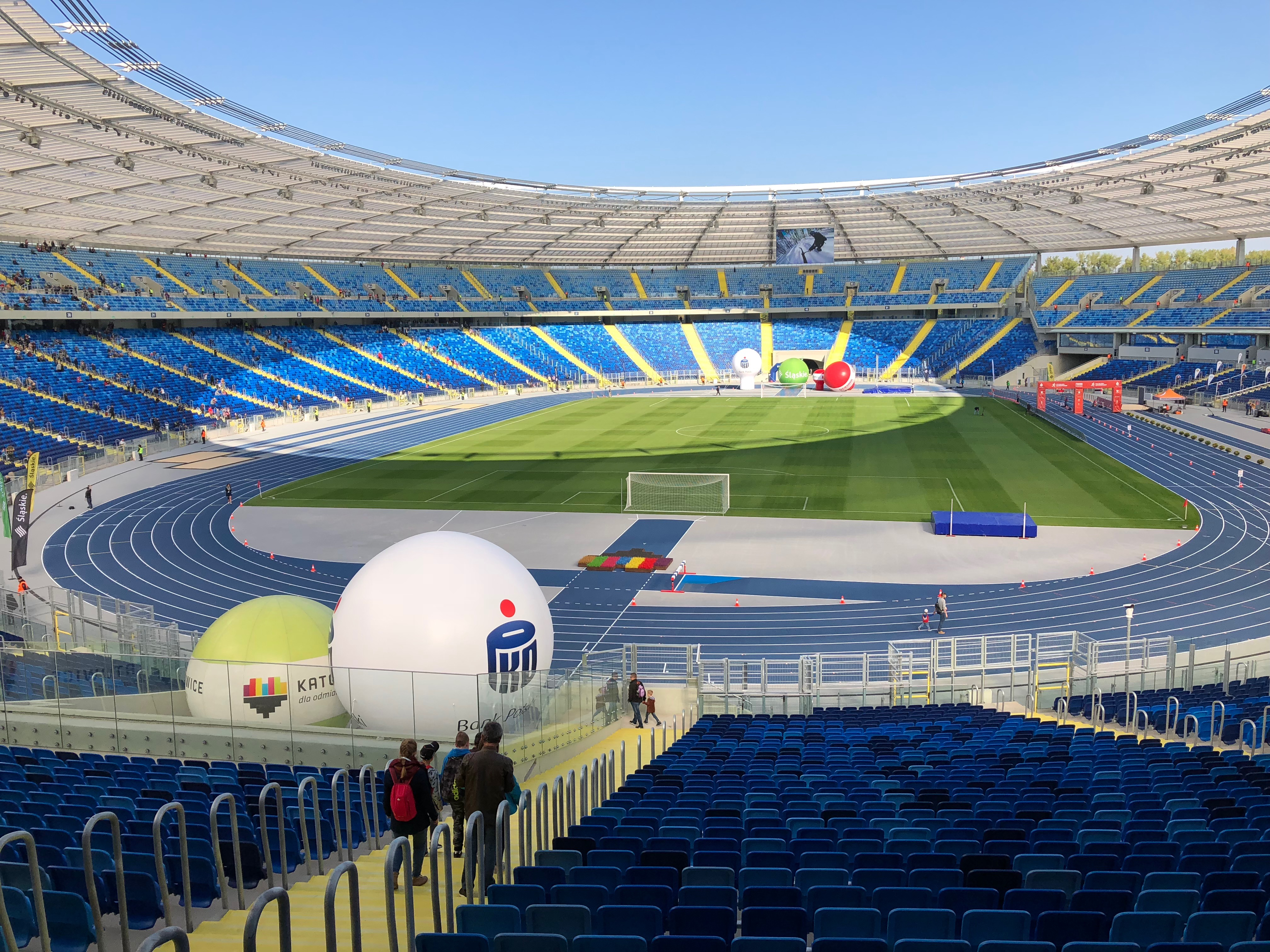
Silesian Stadium in Chorzów hosted athletics

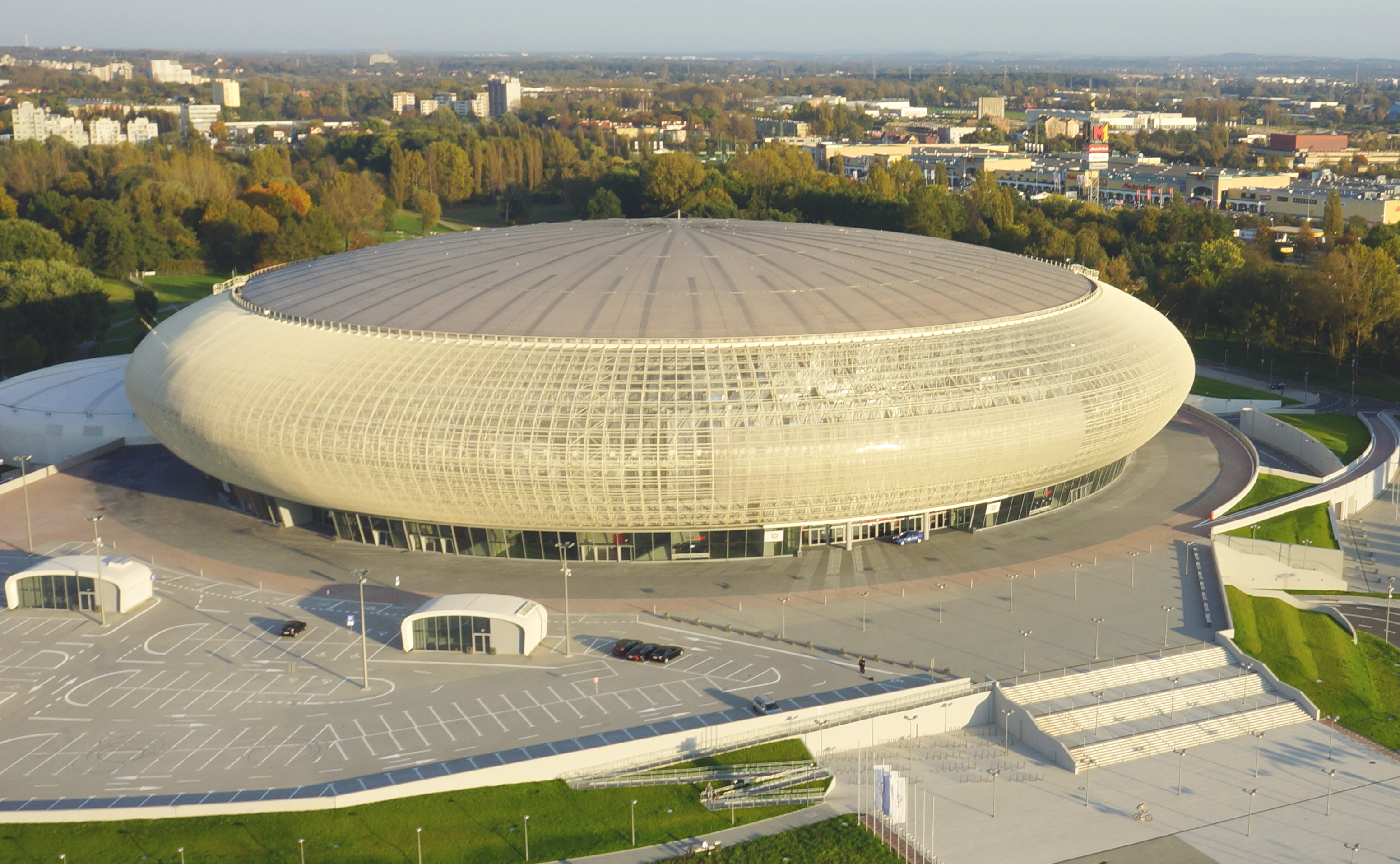
Tauron Arena Kraków

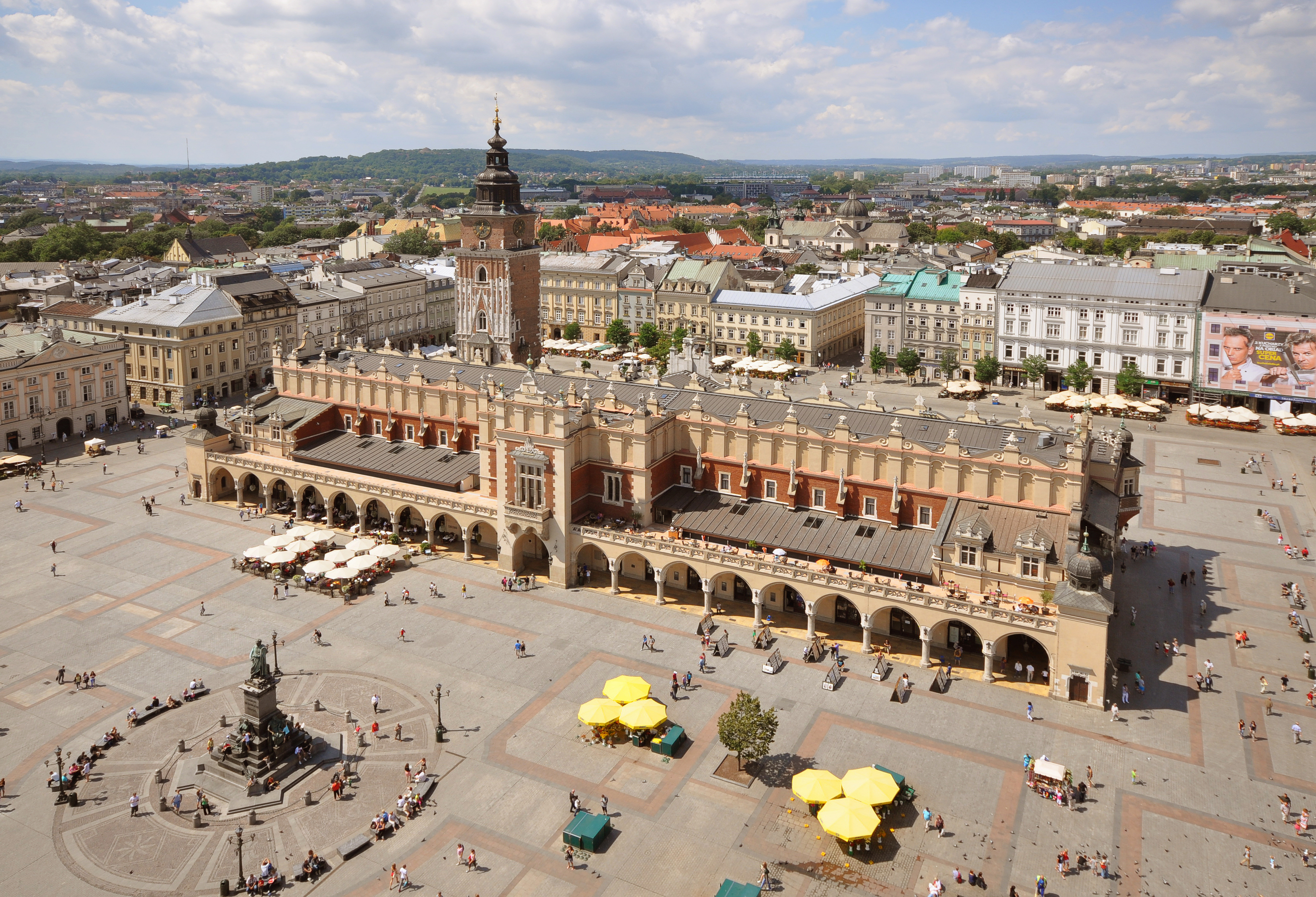
Kraków Main Square

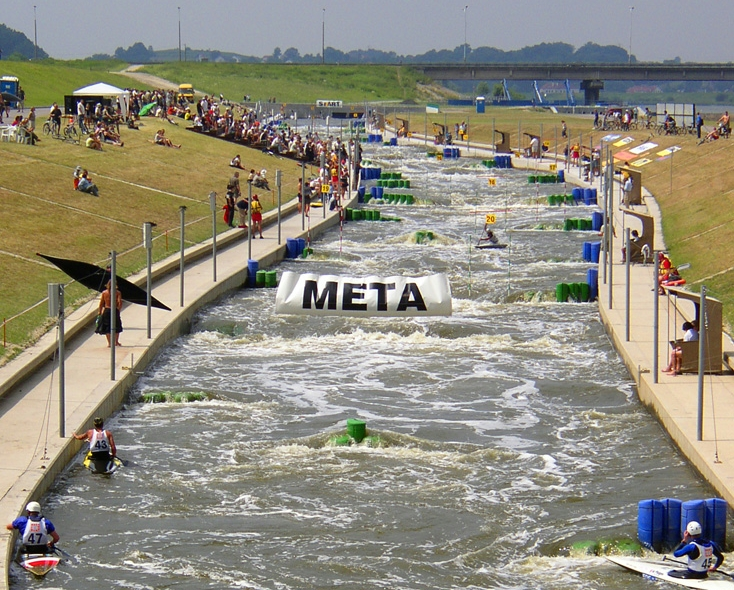
Kraków-Kolna Canoe Slalom Course

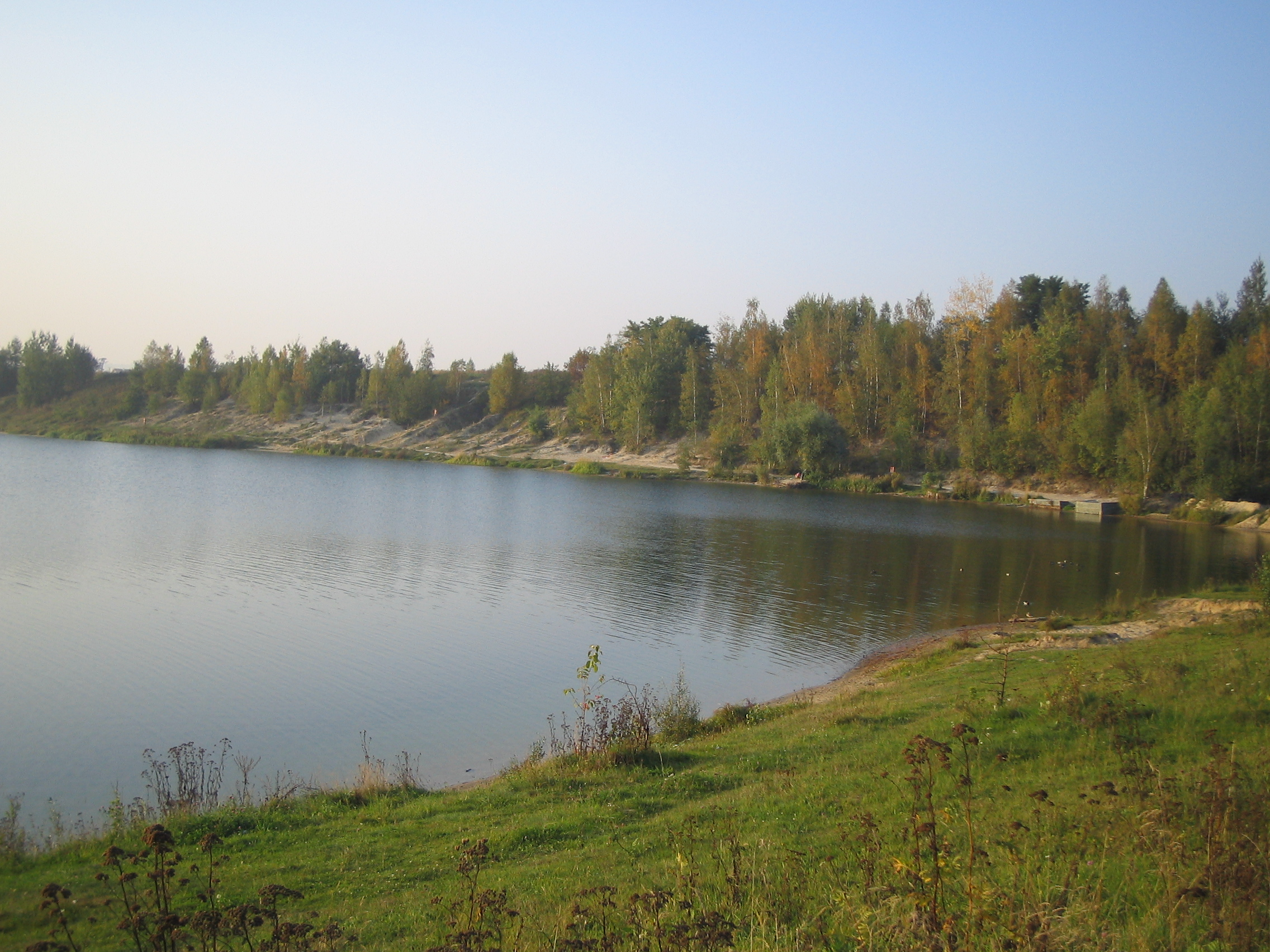
Kryspinów Lake

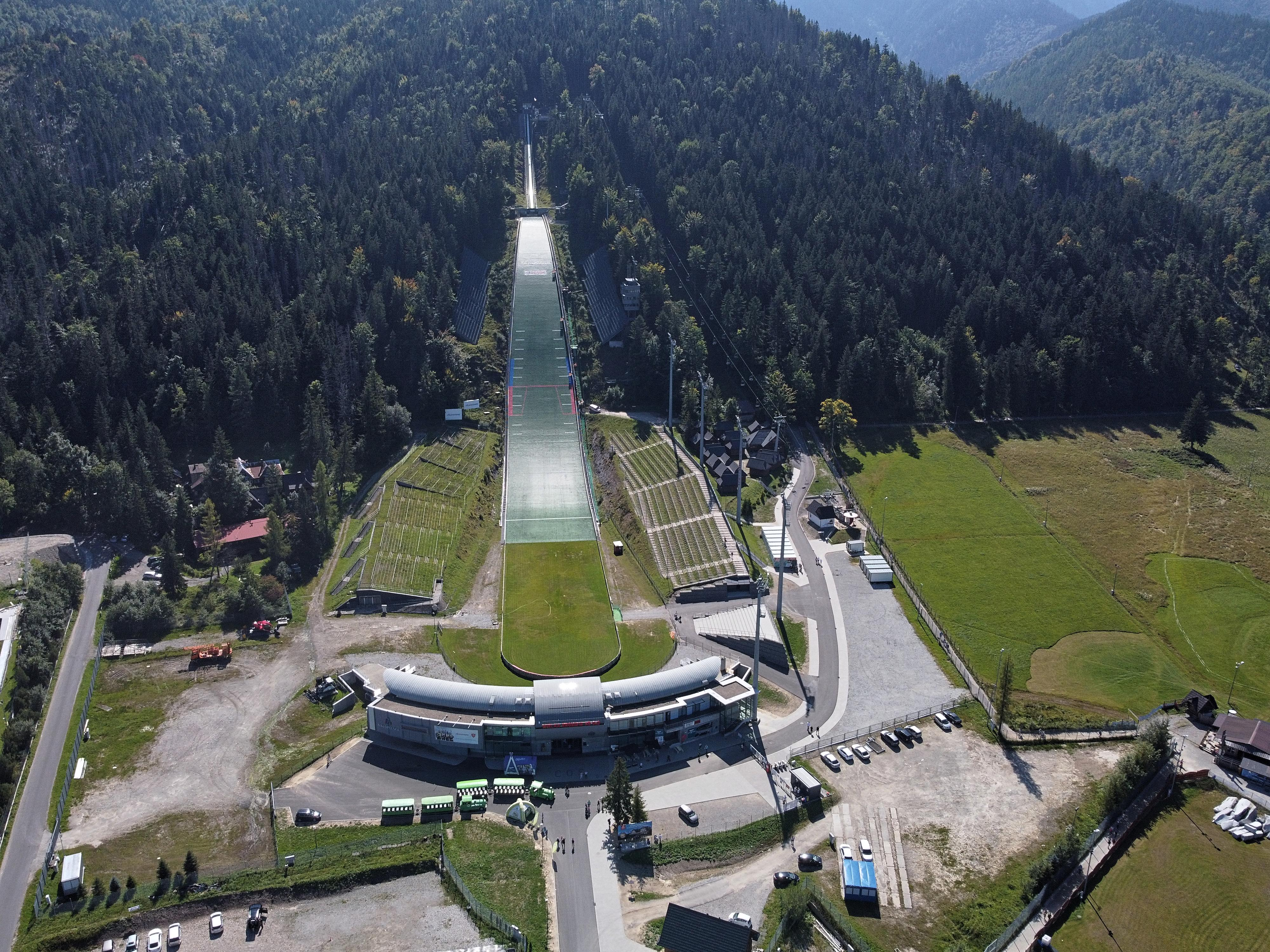
Wielka Krokiew

Key to colours
E	Existing
R	Renovated
T	Temporary

=== Kraków (eleven sports) ===
Venue	Sports	Capacity	
Henryk Reyman Municipal Stadium	Ceremonies and Rugby sevens	33,130	R
Tauron Arena Kraków	Fencing	15,000	E
Cracovia Arena	Basketball 3×3	1,000	T
Hutnik Arena	Table tennis	1,000	E
AWF Sports Centre	Modern pentathlon	1,000	R
Kraków Main Square	Padel and Teqball	1,000	T
Kolna Canoe Slalom Course	Canoe slalom	1,000	E
Kryspinów Waterway	Canoe sprint	1,400	T
Płaszowianka Archery Park	Archery	500	R
Nowa Huta Lake	Triathlon	N/A	E

=== Chorzów (one sport) ===
Venue	Sports	Capacity	
Silesian Stadium	Athletics	54,378	E

=== Bielsko-Biała (one sport) ===
Venue	Sports	Capacity	
Dębowiec Sports Arena	Karate	3,000	E

=== Krynica-Zdrój (four sports) ===
Venue	Sports	Capacity	
Krynica-Zdrój Arena	Judo and Taekwondo	2,635	E
Krynica-Zdrój Hill Park	Mountain bike cycling	N/A	E

=== Krzeszowice (one sport) ===
Venue	Sports	Capacity	
Krzeszowice BMX Park	BMX Freestyle	2,300	T

=== Myślenice (one sport) ===
Venue	Sports	Capacity	
Myślenice Arena	Kickboxing and Muaythai	566	E

=== Nowy Sącz (one sport) ===
Venue	Sports	Capacity	
Strzelecki Park	Breaking	3,070	E

=== Nowy Targ (one sport) ===
Venue	Sports	Capacity	
Nowy Targ Arena	Boxing	3,000	E

=== Oświęcim (one sport) ===
Venue	Sports	Capacity	
Aquatics Centre	Artistic swimming	400	E

=== Rzeszów (one sport) ===
Venue	Sports	Capacity	
Diving Arena	Diving	1,000	E

=== Tarnów (four sports) ===
Venue	Sports	Capacity	
Arena Jaskółka Tarnów	Badminton	4,317	E
Tarnów Beach Arena	Beach handball and Beach soccer	1,000	T
Tarnów Climbing Centre	Sport climbing	2,500	E

=== Wrocław (one sport) ===
Venue	Sports	Capacity	
Wrocław Shooting Centre	Shooting	1,300	E

=== Zakopane (one sport) ===
Venue	Sports	Capacity	
Średnia Krokiew	Ski jumping (normal hill)	15,000	E
Wielka Krokiew	Ski jumping (large hill)	15,000	E

Host cities of the 2023 European Games (Małopolska)
Host cities of the 2023 European Games (outside Małopolska)

== Participating National Olympic Committees ==
The following 48 National Olympic Committees participated, along with the EOC Refugee Team:

Participating National Olympic Committees
- Albania (40)
- Andorra (27)
- Armenia (55)
- Austria (170)
- Azerbaijan (100)
- Belgium (140)
- Bosnia and Herzegovina (55)
- Bulgaria (113)
- Croatia (130)
- Cyprus (74)
- Czech Republic (273)
- Denmark (163)
- Estonia (110)
- Finland (118)
- France (298)
- Georgia (100)
- Germany (361)
- Great Britain (254)
- Greece (170)
- Hungary (246)
- Iceland (38)
- Ireland (123)
- Israel (141)
- Italy (372)
- Kosovo (38)
- Latvia (98)
- Liechtenstein (7)
- Lithuania (148)
- Luxembourg (60)
- Malta (36)
- Moldova (74)
- Monaco (3)
- Montenegro (40)
- Netherlands (186)
- North Macedonia (38)
- Norway (155)
- Poland (404) (host)
- Portugal (208)
- Romania (151)
- EOC Refugee Team (4)
- San Marino (32)
- Serbia (125)
- Slovakia (145)
- Slovenia (143)
- Spain (347)
- Sweden (141)
- Switzerland (220)
- Turkey (193)
- Ukraine (265)

*As a result of the Russian invasion of Ukraine, the European Olympic Committees has taken a decision to not invite athletes from Russia and Belarus to the European Games.

IOC Code	Country	Running Order	Athletes
POL	1	Poland	404
ITA	2	Italy	372
GER	3	Germany	361
ESP	4	Spain	347
FRA	5	France	298
CZE	6	Czech Republic	273
UKR	7	Ukraine	265
GBR	8	Great Britain	254
HUN	9	Hungary	246
SUI	10	Switzerland	220
POR	11	Portugal	208
TUR	12	Turkey	193
NED	13	Netherlands	186
AUT	14	Austria	170
GRE	14	Greece	170
DEN	16	Denmark	163
NOR	17	Norway	155
ROU	18	Romania	151
LTU	19	Lithuania	148
SVK	20	Slovakia	145
SLO	21	Slovenia	143
ISR	22	Israel	141
SWE	22	Sweden	141
BEL	24	Belgium	140
CRO	25	Croatia	130
SRB	26	Serbia	125
IRL	27	Ireland	123
FIN	28	Finland	118
BUL	29	Bulgaria	113
EST	30	Estonia	110
AZE	31	Azerbaijan	100
GEO	31	Georgia	100
LAT	33	Latvia	98
CYP	34	Cyprus	74
MDA	34	Moldova	74
LUX	36	Luxembourg	60
ARM	37	Armenia	55
BIH	38	Bosnia and Herzegovina	55
ALB	39	Albania	40
MNE	39	Montenegro	40
ISL	41	Iceland	38
KOS	41	Kosovo	38
MKD	41	North Macedonia	38
MLT	44	Malta	36
SMR	45	San Marino	32
AND	46	Andorra	27
LIE	47	Liechtenstein	7
ERT	48	Refugee Olympic Team	4
MON	49	Monaco	3
Total		6,857	

== Medal table ==
* Host nation (Poland)

2023 European Games medal table
Rank	NOC	Gold	Silver	Bronze	Total
1	Italy	35	26	39	100
2	Spain	21	17	19	57
3	Ukraine	21	12	8	41
4	Germany	20	16	27	63
5	France	17	19	26	62
6	Poland*	13	19	18	50
7	Great Britain	12	10	27	49
8	Hungary	10	10	18	38
9	Turkey	9	9	20	38
10	Netherlands	8	6	5	19
11	Czech Republic	7	10	11	28
12	Austria	7	6	6	19
13	Switzerland	7	5	12	24
14	Denmark	7	5	5	17
15	Romania	6	6	5	17
16	Norway	6	4	5	15
17	Croatia	5	4	4	13
18	Ireland	4	4	5	13
19	Georgia	4	2	3	9
20	Slovenia	3	8	2	13
21	Portugal	3	7	6	16
22	Serbia	3	6	7	16
23	Bulgaria	3	4	5	12
24	Azerbaijan	3	2	6	11
25	Latvia	3	2	2	7
26	Sweden	2	7	5	14
27	Greece	2	5	10	17
28	Belgium	2	5	6	13
29	Lithuania	2	2	4	8
30	Finland	2	1	5	8
31	Estonia	2	1	0	3
32	Albania	2	0	0	2
33	Slovakia	1	4	3	8
34	Israel	1	1	3	5
35	Moldova	1	0	1	2
36	Cyprus	0	3	2	5
37	Armenia	0	1	2	3
38	Luxembourg	0	1	1	2
39	Bosnia and Herzegovina	0	1	0	1
39	Monaco	0	1	0	1
39	North Macedonia	0	1	0	1
Totals (41 entries)		254	253	333	840

== Marketing ==
=== Emblem ===
The official emblem of the games was unveiled on 21 June 2022, exactly one year before the opening ceremony. Designed by Marcin Salawa the emblem depicts a flame containing the towers of St. Mary's Basilica, to represent the city of Kraków and the Tatra Mountains, to represent the landscape of the Małopolska region. The colours, taken from the coats of arms of Kraków, and Małopolska, represent fire and water. Fire is said to symbolise action, will, energy, while water symbolises spirituality, emotions and purification.

=== Motto ===
The official motto of the games is We are Unity, Polish: Jesteśmy jednością, lit. 'We are One'.

=== Mascots ===
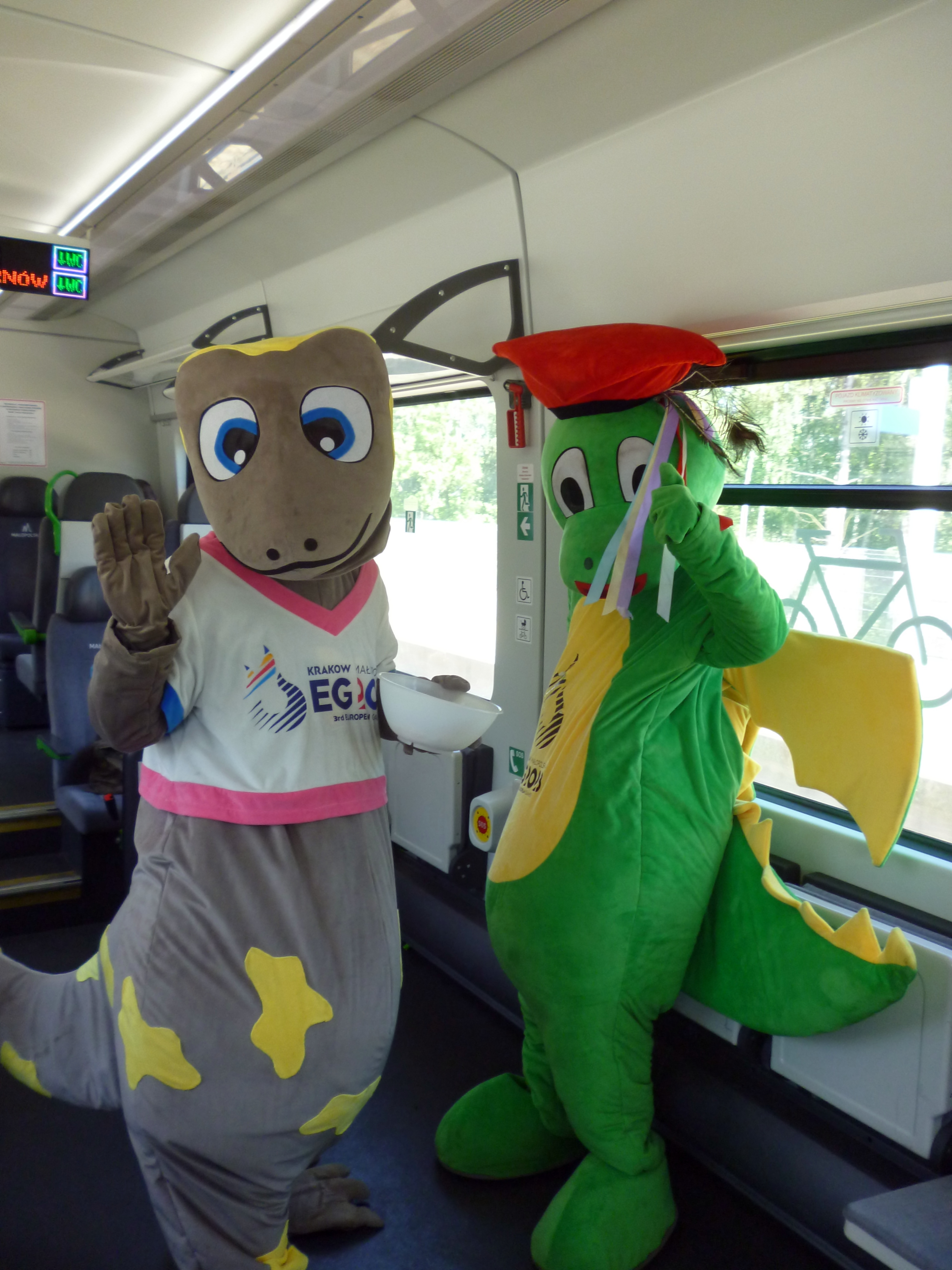
“Sandra” and “Krakusek”, mascots, the official mascots

“Krakusek” the dragon and “Sandra” the salamander have been chosen as the official mascots for the European Games Kraków-Małopolska 2023. The initiative, which received over 2,400 entries, was open to young people aged 5–15 across the continent. The dragon design by 15-year-old Katarzyna Biśta from Libiąż references the local culture and history of Kraków. Alongside Krakusek, the creation of the black and gold salamander by 10-year-old Gloria Goryl from Wojnicz portrays the fire salamander which can be found in south Poland.

== Promotion ==
=== Sponsors ===
On 6 July 2021, Atos has been selected by the European Olympic Committees as its official Digital Technology Partner for the 2023 and 2027 editions of the European Games. As part of this partnership, Atos, long-standing supporter of the Olympic Movement, and EOC, the governing body for Europe's 50 National Olympic Committees, will work together to improve fan engagement. On November 14 2022, representatives of LaLiga and the European Games Organising Committee signed a cooperation agreement to mutually promote sports events and organisations.

General Sponsor	Orlen
Main Partners	Atos, La Liga, Lotto, MARR, Realme, Tauron
Media Patrons	RMF, Wirtualna Polska

=== Broadcasting rights ===
50 countries around the world will broadcast the European Games.

- Albania – RTSH
- Austria – ORF
- Azerbaijan – CBC Sport
- Belgium – RTBF and VRT
- Bulgaria – BNT 3
- Croatia – HRT
- Cyprus – CyBC
- Czech Republic – ČT sport
- Estonia – ERR
- Finland – Yle
- France – TF1 and La chaine L'Équipe
- Germany – ARD and ZDF
- Greece – ERT
- Hungary – MTVA
- Iceland – RÚV
- Ireland – RTÉ
- Israel – TSC
- Italy – RAI
- Kosovo – RTK
- Americas - Panam Sports
- Latin America (except Brazil)^{1} – Claro
- Lithuania – LRT
- Netherlands – NOS
- Norway – NRK
- Poland – TVP
- Portugal – RTP
- Romania – TVR
- Slovakia – RTVS
- Slovenia – RTV Slovenija
- Spain – RTVE and ENJOY
- Sweden – SVT and SR
- Switzerland – SRG SSR
- Turkey – TRT and SARI
- Ukraine – UA:PBC
- United Kingdom - BBC
- Pan European – Eurosport

^1 – Included nations are Argentina, Bolivia, Chile, Colombia, Costa Rica, Dominican Republic, Ecuador, El Salvador, Guatemala, Mexico, Honduras, Nicaragua, Panama, Paraguay, Peru, Uruguay and Venezuela.

== Controversies ==
=== Former LGBT ideology-free zone ===
The region of Małopolska, to which the Games were jointly awarded, declared itself an LGBT ideology-free zone in 2019. In August 2020, the Lord Provost of Edinburgh Frank Ross wrote to Kraków's mayor Jacek Majchrowski to confirm the city's opposition to homophobia after calls for a "serious rethink" of the two cities' twinning relationship. In September 2020, a group of European politicians (including Liz Barker, a member of the House of Lords and Terry Reintke and Marc Angel, two MEPs) published a letter addressed to the European Olympic Committees in which they demanded LGBT rights be respected and suggested that the Games should be held in a different location due to the Małopolska region's status. Flemish sports minister Ben Weyts said the region's LGBT-free zone declaration is "incompatible with the values of the Olympic Charter" and that Olympic Committees should not support bids from such regions. The EOC responded, saying that there would be "no discrimination of any kind" and that the Olympic Charter would be respected. The Małopolska region revoked its declaration of an LGBT ideology-free zone on 27 September 2021 and instead adopted a resolution to "oppose any discrimination against anyone for any reason".

=== Status of Russian and Belarusian athletes ===
The EOC did not allow athletes representing Russia and Belarus to attend the games as a result of the 2022 Russian invasion of Ukraine.

== See also ==
- 2023 European Para Championships
