= Tatiana Kukuľková =

Slovak table tennis player (born 2000)

Personal information
- Nationality: Slovak
- Born: 18 July 2000 (age 26)

Sport
- Sport: Table tennis
Medal record
Women's table tennis
Representing Slovakia
European Championships
Gold medal – first place	2026 Ljubljana	Doubles
Bronze medal – third place	2024 Linz	Doubles

Tatiana Kukuľková (born 18 July 2000) is a Slovak table tennis player.

== Career ==
In October 2024, she competed at the 2024 European Table Tennis Championships and won a bronze medal in the doubles event along with Poland's Natalia Bajor. In October 2026, she again competed at the 2026 European Table Tennis Championships and won a gold medal in the doubles event along with Bajor.
