= Hana Matelová =

Czech table tennis player

Personal information
- Born: 8 June 1990 (age 36) Zlín, Czech Republic
- Height: 160 cm (5 ft 3 in)
- Weight: 53 kg (117 lb)

Sport
- Sport: Table tennis
Medal record
Women's table tennis
Representing Czech Republic
European Championships
Gold medal – first place	2024 Linz	Doubles
Bronze medal – third place	2013 Schwechat	Team
European Games
Bronze medal – third place	2015 Baku	Team

Hana Matelová (born 8 June 1990 in Zlín) is a Czech table tennis player. She competed at the 2016 Summer Olympics in the women's singles event, in which she was eliminated in the first round by Zhang Mo. She won the French Championship with ASRTT Etival Clairefontaine on 2018–2019 season.
