= Barbora Várady =

Slovak table tennis player (born 1992)

Personal information
- Nationality: Slovakia
- Born: Barbora Balážová; 18 March 1992 (age 34) Topoľčany, Czechoslovakia
- Height: 169 cm (5 ft 7 in)
- Weight: 73 kg (161 lb)

Sport
- Sport: Table tennis
Medal record
Women's table tennis
Representing Slovakia
European Championships
Gold medal – first place	2024 Linz	Doubles
Silver medal – second place	2013 Buzău	Mixed doubles
Silver medal – second place	2020 Warsaw	Mixed doubles
Bronze medal – third place	2022 Munich	Mixed doubles
European Youth Summer Olympic Festival
Silver medal – second place	2007 Belgrade	Girls' singles
Silver medal – second place	2007 Belgrade	Girls' doubles

Barbora Várady (née Balážová; born 18 March 1992 in Topoľčany) is a Slovak table tennis player.

== Career ==
She competed at the 2016 Summer Olympics in the women's singles event, in which she was eliminated in the second round by Li Fen.

== Personal life ==
Balážová married Patrik Várady on 13 June 2025.
