= Fu Yu =

Portuguese table tennis player

Personal information
- Nationality: Portuguese
- Born: 29 November 1978 (age 47) Hebei, China
- Height: 1.73 m (5 ft 8 in)
- Weight: 58 kg (128 lb)

Sport
- Sport: Table tennis
- Club: TTC Berlin Eastside
- Playing style: Right-handed, penhold grip
- Highest ranking: 15 (February 2015)
- Current ranking: 55 (15 July 2025)
Medal record
Women's table tennis
Representing Portugal
European Games
Gold medal – first place	2019 Minsk	Singles
Bronze medal – third place	2023 Kraków–Małopolska	Team
European Championships
Silver medal – second place	2016 Budapest	Singles
Silver medal – second place	2019 Nantes	Team
Bronze medal – third place	2013 Schwechat	Singles
Bronze medal – third place	2015 Yekaterinburg	Singles
Bronze medal – third place	2021 Cluj-Napoca	Team
Bronze medal – third place	2023 Malmö	Team
Bronze medal – third place	2025 Zadar	Team
Europe Top-16
Silver medal – second place	2021 Thessaloniki	Singles

Fu Yu (Chinese: 付玉; pinyin: Fù Yù; born 29 November 1978) is a Chinese-born Portuguese table tennis player. She competed at the 2016 Summer Olympics in the women's singles event, in which she was eliminated in the second round by Nanthana Komwong.
