= 2019 Portugal Open (table tennis) =

Tournament details
- Dates: 15–17 February 2019
- Competitors: 64S / 16D
- Total prize money: US$60,000
- Location: Lisbon, Portugal

Champions
- Men's singles: (China) Liang Jingkun
- Women's singles: (Japan) Hina Hayata
- Men's doubles: (China) Cao Wei (China) Xu Yingbin
- Women's doubles: (China) Fan Siqi (China) Yang Huijing
- Mixed doubles: (China) Lin Gaoyuan (China) Liu Shiwen

The 2019 Portugal Open was the first event of the 2019 ITTF Challenge Series. It took place from 15–17 February in Lisbon, Portugal.

== Men's singles ==
=== Seeds ===
1. (China) Lin Gaoyuan (final)
2. (Denmark) Jonathan Groth (first round)
3. (China) Liang Jingkun (champion)
4. (Belarus) Vladimir Samsonov (semifinals)
5. (Nigeria) Quadri Aruna (third round)
6. (Austria) Daniel Habesohn (third round)
7. (Romania) Ovidiu Ionescu (second round)
8. (Egypt) Omar Assar (third round)
9. (Austria) Stefan Fegerl (first round)
10. (Slovakia) Ľubomír Pištej (first round)
11. (Italy) Mihai Bobocica (second round)
12. (Brazil) Eric Jouti (first round)
13. (Czech Republic) Lubomír Jančařík (first round)
14. (Romania) Hunor Szőcs (third round)
15. (China) Wang Chuqin (third round)
16. (Paraguay) Marcelo Aguirre (first round)
17. (Belgium) Florent Lambiet (first round)
18. (Portugal) João Geraldo (second round)
19. (Japan) Yukiya Uda (quarterfinals)
20. (Russia) Alexander Shibaev (first round)
21. (Czech Republic) Pavel Širůček (quarterfinals)
22. (India) Harmeet Desai (second round)
23. (Belgium) Robin Devos (first round)
24. (Austria) Andreas Levenko (first round)
25. (Russia) Alexey Liventsov (first round)
26. (Belarus) Pavel Platonov (second round)
27. (Belgium) Martin Allegro (first round)
28. (England) Paul Drinkhall (first round)
29. (Thailand) Supanut Wisutmaythangkoon (second round)
30. (Ecuador) Alberto Miño (second round)
31. (Hungary) Nandor Ecseki (first round)
32. (Slovenia) Deni Kozul (third round)

=== Draw ===
==== Top half ====
===== Section 1 =====
First round
1	(China) Lin Gaoyuan	11	8	11	12	11
(Austria) David Serdaroglu	8	11	5	10	7
(Germany) Tobias Hippler	1	9	7	6
18	(Portugal) João Geraldo	11	11	11	11
20	(Russia) Alexander Shibaev	10	11	5	11	3	11	7
(China) Sun Wen	12	8	11	8	11	7	11
(Sweden) Truls Moregard	11	5	5	11	9	11	11
12	(Brazil) Eric Jouti	9	11	11	8	11	6	5
11	(Italy) Mihai Bobocica	11	11	11	11	12
(China) Yu Heyi	4	5	13	4	10
(Spain) Carlos Machado	9	11	5	5
21	(Czech Republic) Pavel Širůček	11	13	11	11
24	(Austria) Andreas Levenko	10	11	7	11	11	8	11
(Sweden) Simon Soderlund	12	7	11	9	3	11	13
(Russia) Sadi Ismailov	11	6	5	7	5
5	(Nigeria) Quadri Aruna	6	11	11	11	11

Second round
1	(China) Lin Gaoyuan	11	11	11	11
18	(Portugal) João Geraldo	4	8	9	7
(China) Sun Wen	5	5	11	6	8
(Sweden) Truls Moregard	11	11	7	11	11
11	(Italy) Mihai Bobocica	10	5	4	11
21	(Czech Republic) Pavel Širůček	12	11	11	13
(Sweden) Simon Soderlund	9	6	12	5	4
5	(Nigeria) Quadri Aruna	11	11	10	11	11

Third round
1	(China) Lin Gaoyuan	11	11	11	11	12
(Sweden) Truls Moregard	7	6	9	13	10
21	(Czech Republic) Pavel Širůček	8	5	11	11	11
5	(Nigeria) Quadri Aruna	11	11	9	9	4	INJ

Quarterfinals
1	(China) Lin Gaoyuan	11	11	11	5	11
21	(Czech Republic) Pavel Širůček	4	9	6	11	5

===== Section 2 =====
First round
6	(Austria) Daniel Habesohn	11	11	9	11	12	11
(Russia) Aleksandr Tiutriumov	6	6	11	6	14	6
(India) Anthony Amalraj	11	14	11	11	6	11
27	(Belgium) Martin Allegro	6	12	13	9	11	8
26	(Belarus) Pavel Platonov	11	3	11	9	6	12	11
(China) Cao Wei	8	11	9	11	11	10	9
(China) Xu Yingbin	11	11	11	11
16	(Paraguay) Marcelo Aguirre	9	8	9	6
13	(Czech Republic) Lubomír Jančařík	12	11	6	9	6	11
(Japan) Masaki Takami	10	2	11	11	11	13
(Czech Republic) David Reitspies	11	11	7	8	1	11	8
32	(Slovenia) Deni Kozul	2	6	11	11	11	7	11
23	(Belgium) Robin Devos	8	11	11	6	7	14	8
(England) Tom Jarvis	11	8	9	11	11	12	11
(Portugal) Diogo Silva	10	6	5	11	11	4
4	(Belarus) Vladimir Samsonov	12	11	11	9	9	11

Second round
6	(Austria) Daniel Habesohn	11	11	5	11	7	11
(India) Anthony Amalraj	4	5	11	5	11	6
26	(Belarus) Pavel Platonov	11	11	11	4	3	12	8
(China) Xu Yingbin	9	9	13	11	11	10	11
(Japan) Masaki Takami	8	11	11	6	11	9	7
32	(Slovenia) Deni Kozul	11	9	7	11	7	11	11
(England) Tom Jarvis	3	9	5	4
4	(Belarus) Vladimir Samsonov	11	11	11	11

Third round
6	(Austria) Daniel Habesohn	7	4	11	14	3
(China) Xu Yingbin	11	11	4	16	11
32	(Slovenia) Deni Kozul	6	8	8	3
4	(Belarus) Vladimir Samsonov	11	11	11	11

Quarterfinals
(China) Xu Yingbin	13	9	2	11	3
4	(Belarus) Vladimir Samsonov	11	11	11	13	11

==== Bottom half ====
===== Section 3 =====
First round
3	(China) Liang Jingkun	11	12	11	12
(Russia) Vladimir Sidorenko	3	10	5	10
(Sweden) Elias Ranefur	11	11	11	5	11
17	(Belgium) Florent Lambiet	7	9	9	11	5
29	(Thailand) Supanut Wisutmaythangkoon	12	11	11	11	11
(Hungary) Bence Majoros	14	4	3	6	5
(Portugal) Andre Silva	5	10	11	7	5
15	(China) Wang Chuqin	11	12	7	11	11
10	(Slovakia) Ľubomír Pištej	8	12	11	11	9	7
(Germany) Qiu Dang	11	14	7	7	11	11
(China) Sai Linwei	8	12	6	12	10
30	(Ecuador) Alberto Miño	11	14	11	10	12
28	(England) Paul Drinkhall	11	10	3	11	7	8
(China) Niu Guankai	7	12	11	6	11	11
(Germany) Steffen Mengel	12	7	11	5	13	4
7	(Romania) Ovidiu Ionescu	10	11	7	11	15	11

Second round
3	(China) Liang Jingkun	11	11	11	11
(Sweden) Elias Ranefur	9	8	4	7
29	(Thailand) Supanut Wisutmaythangkoon	7	7	7	7
15	(China) Wang Chuqin	11	11	11	11
(Germany) Qiu Dang	13	11	9	3	11	11	11
30	(Ecuador) Alberto Miño	15	5	11	11	9	9	3
(China) Niu Guankai	11	9	11	4	10	11	12
7	(Romania) Ovidiu Ionescu	4	11	8	11	12	8	10

Third round
3	(China) Liang Jingkun	11	11	12	6	11
15	(China) Wang Chuqin	4	7	10	11	5
(Germany) Qiu Dang	8	10	12	9	6
(China) Niu Guankai	11	12	10	11	11

Quarterfinals
3	(China) Liang Jingkun	11	11	11	11
(China) Niu Guankai	8	1	4	7

===== Section 4 =====
First round
8	(Egypt) Omar Assar	12	5	2	11	12	6	12
(China) Xiang Peng	10	11	11	9	10	11	10
(China) Xu Haidong	11	11	11	11
31	(Hungary) Nandor Ecseki	4	8	8	5
19	(Japan) Yukiya Uda	13	11	8	13	11	14
(Portugal) Diogo Carvalho	11	8	11	15	8	12
(China) Zhang Yudong	11	11	9	11	6	11
9	(Austria) Stefan Fegerl	6	5	11	9	11	6
14	(Romania) Hunor Szőcs	11	10	10	11	11	11
(Serbia) Aleksandar Karakašević	7	12	12	6	5	9
(Romania) Rareş Şipoş	8	7	1	2
22	(India) Harmeet Desai	11	11	11	11
25	(Russia) Alexey Liventsov	4	6	6	9
(China) Liu Yebo	11	11	11	11
(Japan) Shunsuke Togami	11	10	11	15	11
2	(Denmark) Jonathan Groth	6	12	9	13	4

Second round
8	(Egypt) Omar Assar	13	13	12	11	8	11
(China) Xu Haidong	11	11	10	13	11	5
19	(Japan) Yukiya Uda	14	11	11	11
(China) Zhang Yudong	12	8	8	9
14	(Romania) Hunor Szőcs	11	11	13	11
22	(India) Harmeet Desai	2	5	11	7
(China) Liu Yebo	14	7	13	8	11	11
(Japan) Shunsuke Togami	12	11	11	11	8	8

Third round
8	(Egypt) Omar Assar	6	8	7	11	11	2
19	(Japan) Yukiya Uda	11	11	11	7	7	11
14	(Romania) Hunor Szőcs	11	9	6	11	11	12	7
(China) Liu Yebo	9	11	11	8	4	14	11

Quarterfinals
19	(Japan) Yukiya Uda	11	11	11	11	7	9	4
(China) Liu Yebo	6	5	9	13	11	11	11

==== Finals ====
Semifinals									Final
1	(China) Lin Gaoyuan	11	11	8	11	11	11
4	(Belarus) Vladimir Samsonov	7	13	11	9	8	7		1	(China) Lin Gaoyuan	11	10	12	7	6
3	(China) Liang Jingkun	10	10	11	10	11	11	11	3	(China) Liang Jingkun	6	12	14	11	11
	(China) Liu Yebo	12	12	8	12	2	7	9

== Women's singles ==
=== Seeds ===
1. (China) Liu Shiwen (third round)
2. (Japan) Hitomi Sato (third round)
3. (Japan) Saki Shibata (quarterfinals)
4. (Romania) Elizabeta Samara (third round)
5. (Japan) Miyu Kato (quarterfinals)
6. (Japan) Honoka Hashimoto (final)
7. (Germany) Shan Xiaona (first round)
8. (Hungary) Georgina Póta (quarterfinals)
9. (Hong Kong) Soo Wai Yam Minnie (third round)
10. (Netherlands) Britt Eerland (second round)
11. (Japan) Hina Hayata (champion)
12. (Hong Kong) Ng Wing Nam (first round)
13. (United States) Wu Yue (first round)
14. (Egypt) Dina Meshref (first round)
15. (Poland) Natalia Partyka (first round)
16. (Germany) Sabine Winter (first round)
17. (Japan) Satsuki Odo (second round)
18. (Ukraine) Ganna Gaponova (second round)
19. (Austria) Liu Jia (second round)
20. (Russia) Yana Noskova (second round)
21. (Hungary) Szandra Pergel (first round)
22. (Brazil) Bruna Takahashi (first round)
23. (Hungary) Dóra Madarász (first round)
24. (Russia) Olga Vorobeva (first round)
25. (Sweden) Linda Bergstrom (second round)
26. (Czech Republic) Dana Čechová (first round)
27. (Switzerland) Rachel Moret (first round)
28. (Russia) Mariia Tailakova (first round)
29. (France) Stéphanie Loeuillette (first round)
30. (Italy) Debora Vivarelli (first round)
31. (United States) Lily Zhang (second round)
32. (Portugal) Shao Jieni (second round)

=== Draw ===
==== Top half ====
===== Section 1 =====
First round
1	(China) Liu Shiwen	11	11	11	11
(India) Madhurika Patkar	3	4	2	2
(India) Archana Girish Kamath	7	11	11	11	7	10
32	(Portugal) Shao Jieni	11	7	9	13	11	12
19	(Austria) Liu Jia	11	11	11	3	12
(Romania) Daniela Dodean	2	9	9	11	10
(Germany) Chantal Mantz	5	6	8	8
11	(Japan) Hina Hayata	11	11	11	11
12	(Hong Kong) Ng Wing Nam	11	11	5	8	5	4
(Chinese Taipei) Huang Hsin	8	9	11	11	11	11
(China) Zhang Binyue	11	11	9	5	6
20	(Russia) Yana Noskova	4	13	11	11	11
21	(Hungary) Szandra Pergel	11	6	3	9	4
(Japan) Yumeno Soma	4	11	11	11	11
(Chinese Taipei) Lin Chia-hsuan	11	6	6	11	8	5
8	(Hungary) Georgina Póta	9	11	11	9	11	11

Second round
1	(China) Liu Shiwen	11	11	11	11
32	(Portugal) Shao Jieni	6	4	5	9
19	(Austria) Liu Jia	6	7	INJ
11	(Japan) Hina Hayata	11	11
(Chinese Taipei) Huang Hsin	11	11	10	9	11	11
20	(Russia) Yana Noskova	6	9	12	11	6	7
(Japan) Yumeno Soma	4	9	8	7
8	(Hungary) Georgina Póta	11	11	11	11

Third round
1	(China) Liu Shiwen	11	10	12	9	11	8
11	(Japan) Hina Hayata	9	12	14	11	8	11
(Chinese Taipei) Huang Hsin	7	7	12	9
8	(Hungary) Georgina Póta	11	11	14	11

Quarterfinals
11	(Japan) Hina Hayata	11	11	11	11
8	(Hungary) Georgina Póta	6	2	2	2

===== Section 2 =====
First round
7	(Germany) Shan Xiaona	5	11	11	11	10	7	8
(China) Hu Limei	11	5	6	5	12	11	11
(China) Huang Yingqi	9	11	4	11	11	13
29	(France) Stéphanie Loeuillette	11	3	11	8	5	11
23	(Hungary) Dóra Madarász	3	3	1	2
(China) Kuai Man	11	11	11	11
(Serbia) Andrea Todorović	6	11	6	11	11	10	7
10	(Netherlands) Britt Eerland	11	1	11	9	8	12	11
16	(Germany) Sabine Winter	9	7	11	11	8	7
(Chinese Taipei) Su Pei-ling	11	11	9	3	11	11
(Romania) Irina Ciobanu
25	(Sweden) Linda Bergstrom	w/o
31	(United States) Lily Zhang	10	11	11	11	11
(Russia) Valeria Shcherbatykh	12	5	5	4	0^{r}
(Netherlands) Kim Vermaas	6	9	7	9
3	(Japan) Saki Shibata	11	11	11	11

Second round
(China) Hu Limei	11	11	11	11
(China) Huang Yingqi	7	2	7	9
(China) Kuai Man	11	7	11	12	10	11
10	(Netherlands) Britt Eerland	6	11	7	10	12	6
(Chinese Taipei) Su Pei-ling	11	6	11	11	11
25	(Sweden) Linda Bergstrom	6	11	7	7	7
31	(United States) Lily Zhang	6	9	7	11	5
3	(Japan) Saki Shibata	11	11	11	7	11

Third round
(China) Hu Limei	12	11	7	11	6	11
(China) Kuai Man	10	9	11	5	11	5
(Chinese Taipei) Su Pei-ling	4	12	11	5	7
3	(Japan) Saki Shibata	11	14	8	11	11

Quarterfinals
(China) Hu Limei	10	13	13	11	6	14	11
3	(Japan) Saki Shibata	12	11	15	8	11	12	6

==== Bottom half ====
===== Section 3 =====
First round
4	(Romania) Elizabeta Samara	11	11	11	11
(Japan) Haruna Ojio	4	8	6	8
(Belarus) Nadezhda Bogdanova	8	11	11	11	8	11	11
27	(Switzerland) Rachel Moret	11	7	8	8	11	13	7
24	(Russia) Olga Vorobeva	6	9	6	7
(China) Li Jiayuan	11	11	11	11
(Japan) Ayami Narumoto	11	11	6	11	11
13	(United States) Wu Yue	6	9	11	5	7
9	(Hong Kong) Soo Wai Yam Minnie	15	11	11	9	16	11
(Belarus) Daria Trigolos	13	5	13	11	14	9
(Romania) Adina Diaconu	11	5	11	11	11
30	(Italy) Debora Vivarelli	5	11	7	4	7
26	(Czech Republic) Dana Čechová	7	10	7	9
(China) Wu Yangchen	11	12	11	11
(France) Laura Gasnier	11	6	14	9	11	10	7
5	(Japan) Miyu Kato	6	11	12	11	4	12	11

Second round
4	(Romania) Elizabeta Samara	11	6	17	11	11
(Belarus) Nadezhda Bogdanova	5	11	15	7	7
(China) Li Jiayuan	11	11	10	11	5	11
(Japan) Ayami Narumoto	6	6	12	6	11	6
9	(Hong Kong) Soo Wai Yam Minnie	11	11	11	11
(Romania) Adina Diaconu	8	5	5	7
(China) Wu Yangchen	7	11	11	7	6	11	7
5	(Japan) Miyu Kato	11	9	8	11	11	9	11

Third round
4	(Romania) Elizabeta Samara	8	9	11	8	8
(China) Li Jiayuan	11	11	7	11	11
9	(Hong Kong) Soo Wai Yam Minnie	11	9	11	12	10	10	9
5	(Japan) Miyu Kato	8	11	7	10	12	12	11

Quarterfinals
(China) Li Jiayuan	11	16	15	11	10	11
5	(Japan) Miyu Kato	7	14	17	4	12	5

===== Section 4 =====
First round
6	(Japan) Honoka Hashimoto	11	11	11	11
(Portugal) Liu Yangzi	5	7	8	6
(China) Chen Yi	12	11	11	11
28	(Russia) Mariia Tailakova	10	8	2	9
18	(Ukraine) Ganna Gaponova	11	11	8	11	9	11
(India) Krittwika Roy	6	7	11	5	11	3
(Poland) Natalia Bajor	11	11	9	11	11
14	(Egypt) Dina Meshref	4	9	11	6	7
15	(Poland) Natalia Partyka	2	7	11	6
(China) Fan Siqi	11	11	13	11
(China) Guo Yuhan	11	11	11	11	11
22	(Brazil) Bruna Takahashi	13	6	2	4	9
17	(Japan) Satsuki Odo	6	11	9	11	11	11
(Norway) Ma Wenting	11	8	11	7	9	6
(Slovakia) Tatiana Kukuľková	2	11	4	8	4
2	(Japan) Hitomi Sato	11	9	11	11	11

Second round
6	(Japan) Honoka Hashimoto	9	11	9	11	12	11	11
(China) Chen Yi	11	3	11	5	14	8	6
18	(Ukraine) Ganna Gaponova	15	11	9	8	11	8	10
(Poland) Natalia Bajor	13	5	11	11	6	11	12
(China) Fan Siqi	6	11	11	11	11	11
(China) Guo Yuhan	11	5	8	13	2	9
17	(Japan) Satsuki Odo	11	6	11	12	6	10	9
2	(Japan) Hitomi Sato	9	11	9	10	11	12	11

Third round
6	(Japan) Honoka Hashimoto	11	11	8	12	11	11	11
(Poland) Natalia Bajor	6	13	11	14	5	3	8
(China) Fan Siqi	9	11	13	11	11
2	(Japan) Hitomi Sato	11	9	11	5	8

Quarterfinals
6	(Japan) Honoka Hashimoto	12	7	4	5	11	11	11
(China) Fan Siqi	10	11	11	11	7	4	8

==== Finals ====
Semifinals							Final
11	(Japan) Hina Hayata	10	11	11	11	11
	(China) Hu Limei	12	4	9	6	6	11	(Japan) Hina Hayata	9	8	11	12	11	8	11
	(China) Li Jiayuan	11	2	6	8	3	6	(Japan) Honoka Hashimoto	11	11	4	10	3	11	8
6	(Japan) Honoka Hashimoto	7	11	11	11	11

== Men's doubles ==
=== Seeds ===
1. (Hungary) Nandor Ecseki / Adam Szudi (semifinals)
2. (China) Liang Jingkun / Lin Gaoyuan (semifinals)
3. (Belgium) Martin Allegro / Florent Lambiet (first round)
4. (Poland) Marek Badowski / Patryk Zatowka (first round)
5. (India) Sanil Shetty / Manav Vikash Thakkar (first round)
6. (India) Anthony Amalraj / Harmeet Desai (first round)
7. (Belgium) Laurens Devos / Robin Devos (first round)
8. (Portugal) Diogo Carvalho / João Geraldo (quarterfinals)

=== Draw ===
First round
1	(Hungary) Nandor Ecseki (Hungary) Adam Szudi	11	11	4	11
(Romania) Cristian Pletea (Romania) Rareş Şipoş	6	6	11	7
(Czech Republic) Tomáš Polanský (Czech Republic) Pavel Širůček	9	4	6
8	(Portugal) Diogo Carvalho (Portugal) João Geraldo	11	11	11
7	(Belgium) Laurens Devos (Belgium) Robin Devos	9	8	7
(Slovakia) Samuel Kaluzny (Slovakia) Ľubomír Pištej	11	11	11
(Japan) Shunsuke Togami (Japan) Yukiya Uda	11	13	11	11
4	(Poland) Marek Badowski (Poland) Patryk Zatowka	9	15	9	8
3	(Belgium) Martin Allegro (Belgium) Florent Lambiet	8	11	8	11	7
(Germany) Kilian Ort (Germany) Qiu Dang	11	7	11	5	11
(China) Cao Wei (China) Xu Yingbin	11	11	11
6	(India) Anthony Amalraj (India) Harmeet Desai	6	7	8
5	(India) Sanil Shetty (India) Manav Vikash Thakkar	6	7	6
(Japan) Yuki Matsuyama (Japan) Masaki Takami	11	11	11
(Chinese Taipei) Li Hsin-yang (Chinese Taipei) Sun Chia-hung	6	13	11	7	5
2	(China) Liang Jingkun (China) Lin Gaoyuan	11	11	9	11	11

Quarterfinals
1	(Hungary) Nandor Ecseki (Hungary) Adam Szudi	11	12	11
8	(Portugal) Diogo Carvalho (Portugal) João Geraldo	6	10	9
(Slovakia) Samuel Kaluzny (Slovakia) Ľubomír Pištej	11	10	11	13	5
(Japan) Shunsuke Togami (Japan) Yukiya Uda	1	12	13	11	11
(Germany) Kilian Ort (Germany) Qiu Dang	6	5	2
(China) Cao Wei (China) Xu Yingbin	11	11	11
(Japan) Yuki Matsuyama (Japan) Masaki Takami	6	3	2
2	(China) Liang Jingkun (China) Lin Gaoyuan	11	11	11

Semifinals
1	(Hungary) Nandor Ecseki (Hungary) Adam Szudi	11	8	8	6
(Japan) Shunsuke Togami (Japan) Yukiya Uda	9	11	11	11
(China) Cao Wei (China) Xu Yingbin	14	11	6	11
2	(China) Liang Jingkun (China) Lin Gaoyuan	12	7	11	9

Final
(Japan) Shunsuke Togami (Japan) Yukiya Uda	11	5	6	7
(China) Cao Wei (China) Xu Yingbin	5	11	11	11

== Women's doubles ==
=== Seeds ===
1. (Hong Kong) Ng Wing Nam / Soo Wai Yam Minnie (first round)
2. (Japan) Satsuki Odo / Saki Shibata (quarterfinals)
3. (United States) Wu Yue / Lily Zhang (first round)
4. (Hungary) Dóra Madarász / Szandra Pergel (final)
5. (Romania) Daniela Dodean / Elizabeta Samara (semifinals)
6. (Poland) Natalia Bajor / Natalia Partyka (quarterfinals)
7. (Egypt) Dina Meshref / (Italy) Debora Vivarelli (first round)
8. (Portugal) Leila Oliveira / Shao Jieni (quarterfinals)

=== Draw ===
First round
1	(Hong Kong) Ng Wing Nam (Hong Kong) Soo Wai Yam Minnie	7	11	12	6
(Chinese Taipei) Huang Yu-wen (Chinese Taipei) Li Yu-jhun	11	3	14	11
(Belarus) Nadezhda Bogdanova (Belarus) Daria Trigolos	13	7	7	8
6	(Poland) Natalia Bajor (Poland) Natalia Partyka	11	11	11	11
7	(Egypt) Dina Meshref (Italy) Debora Vivarelli	11	7	7	11	9
(Chinese Taipei) Huang Hsin (Chinese Taipei) Huang Yu-chiao	9	11	11	9	11
(China) Fan Siqi (China) Yang Huijing	11	7	11	11
3	(United States) Wu Yue (United States) Lily Zhang	7	11	3	8
4	(Hungary) Dóra Madarász (Hungary) Szandra Pergel	11	11	4	11
(France) Stéphanie Loeuillette (France) Yuan Jianan	5	8	11	9
(Sweden) Filippa Bergand (Sweden) Linda Bergstrom	6	9	11	11	4
8	(Portugal) Leila Oliveira (Portugal) Shao Jieni	11	11	2	9	11
5	(Romania) Daniela Dodean (Romania) Elizabeta Samara	11	15	6	11
(Japan) Haruna Ojio (Japan) Yumeno Soma	9	13	11	3
(Wales) Charlotte Carey (Slovakia) Tatiana Kukuľková	8	1	1
2	(Japan) Satsuki Odo (Japan) Saki Shibata	11	11	11

Quarterfinals
(Chinese Taipei) Huang Yu-wen (Chinese Taipei) Li Yu-jhun	11	12	11	11
6	(Poland) Natalia Bajor (Poland) Natalia Partyka	9	14	9	9
(Chinese Taipei) Huang Hsin (Chinese Taipei) Huang Yu-chiao	5	10	6
(China) Fan Siqi (China) Yang Huijing	11	12	11
4	(Hungary) Dóra Madarász (Hungary) Szandra Pergel	7	11	11	11
8	(Portugal) Leila Oliveira (Portugal) Shao Jieni	11	6	7	7
5	(Romania) Daniela Dodean (Romania) Elizabeta Samara	11	11	9	11
2	(Japan) Satsuki Odo (Japan) Saki Shibata	4	5	11	9

Semifinals
(Chinese Taipei) Huang Yu-wen (Chinese Taipei) Li Yu-jhun	6	8	9
(China) Fan Siqi (China) Yang Huijing	11	11	11
4	(Hungary) Dóra Madarász (Hungary) Szandra Pergel	3	11	11	13	13
5	(Romania) Daniela Dodean (Romania) Elizabeta Samara	11	4	6	15	11

Final
(China) Fan Siqi (China) Yang Huijing	8	3	11	11	11
4	(Hungary) Dóra Madarász (Hungary) Szandra Pergel	11	11	6	9	2

== Mixed doubles ==
=== Seeds ===
1. (China) Lin Gaoyuan / Liu Shiwen (champions)
2. (Slovakia) Ľubomír Pištej / Tatiana Kukuľková (final)
3. (Egypt) Omar Assar / Dina Meshref (first round)
4. (Netherlands) Laurens Tromer / Britt Eerland (first round)
5. (Hungary) Adam Szudi / Szandra Pergel (quarterfinals)
6. (Argentina) Gaston Alto / Camila Arguelles (first round)
7. (Portugal) Diogo Carvalho / Shao Jieni (first round)
8. (China) Wang Chuqin / Yang Huijing (quarterfinals)

=== Draw ===
First round
1	(China) Lin Gaoyuan (China) Liu Shiwen	11	11	11
(Poland) Marek Badowski (Poland) Natalia Bajor	4	6	9
(France) Tristan Flore (France) Laura Gasnier	11	5	10	8
5	(Hungary) Adam Szudi (Hungary) Szandra Pergel	2	11	12	11
6	(Argentina) Gaston Alto (Argentina) Camila Arguelles	8	12	3	6
(Germany) Kilian Ort (Germany) Wan Yuan	11	10	11	11
(Hungary) Nandor Ecseki (Hungary) Dóra Madarász	11	11	11
4	(Netherlands) Laurens Tromer (Netherlands) Britt Eerland	9	8	5
3	(Egypt) Omar Assar (Egypt) Dina Meshref
(Chinese Taipei) Li Hsin-yang (Chinese Taipei) Lin Chia-hsuan	w/o
(Serbia) Aleksandar Karakašević (Serbia) Izabela Lupulesku	11	5	14	11
7	(Portugal) Diogo Carvalho (Portugal) Shao Jieni	5	11	12	9
8	(China) Wang Chuqin (China) Yang Huijing	11	11	11
(Poland) Patryk Zatowka (Poland) Natalia Partyka	2	6	3
(Austria) Thomas Grininger (Austria) Karoline Mischek	9	11	5	10
2	(Slovakia) Ľubomír Pištej (Slovakia) Tatiana Kukuľková	11	7	11	12

Quarterfinals
1	(China) Lin Gaoyuan (China) Liu Shiwen	11	11	11
5	(Hungary) Adam Szudi (Hungary) Szandra Pergel	7	9	9
(Germany) Kilian Ort (Germany) Wan Yuan	11	9	4	8
(Hungary) Nandor Ecseki (Hungary) Dóra Madarász	5	11	11	11
(Chinese Taipei) Li Hsin-yang (Chinese Taipei) Lin Chia-hsuan	5	4	11	11	8
(Serbia) Aleksandar Karakašević (Serbia) Izabela Lupulesku	11	11	8	8	11
8	(China) Wang Chuqin (China) Yang Huijing	9	5	11	13	8
2	(Slovakia) Ľubomír Pištej (Slovakia) Tatiana Kukuľková	11	11	5	11	11

Semifinals
1	(China) Lin Gaoyuan (China) Liu Shiwen	11	7	11	13
(Hungary) Nandor Ecseki (Hungary) Dóra Madarász	3	11	8	11
(Serbia) Aleksandar Karakašević (Serbia) Izabela Lupulesku	7	11	11	8	6
2	(Slovakia) Ľubomír Pištej (Slovakia) Tatiana Kukuľková	11	7	3	11	11

Final
1	(China) Lin Gaoyuan (China) Liu Shiwen	11	11	11
2	(Slovakia) Ľubomír Pištej (Slovakia) Tatiana Kukuľková	8	6	4
