= 2019 World Table Tennis Championships – Women's singles =

Women's singles at the 2019 World Table Tennis Championships
- Venue: Hungexpo
- Location: Budapest, Hungary
- Dates: 23–27 April
- Final score: 9–11, 11–7, 11–7, 7–11, 11–0, 11–9

Medalists
gold medal	Liu Shiwen	China
silver medal	Chen Meng	China
bronze medal	Ding Ning	China
bronze medal	Wang Manyu	China

The women's singles competition of the 2019 World Table Tennis Championships was held from 23 to 27 April 2019. Ding Ning was the defending champion but lost in the semifinals.

Liu Shiwen won the title after defeating Chen Meng 9–11, 11–7, 11–7, 7–11, 11–0, 11–9. Later in a sit down interview with CCTV, Liu stated that she expected Chen to take an early lead since she had a technical advantage, but Liu felt she had a psychological advantage due to her two finals experiences and extreme desire to win.

== Seeds ==
1. (China) Ding Ning (semifinals)
2. (China) Chen Meng (final)
3. (China) Wang Manyu (semifinals)
4. (China) Liu Shiwen (world champion)
5. (Japan) Kasumi Ishikawa (fourth round)
6. (Japan) Mima Ito (third round)
7. (Chinese Taipei) Cheng I-ching (third round)
8. (Japan) Miu Hirano (quarterfinals)
9. (Singapore) Feng Tianwei (fourth round)
10. (South Korea) Suh Hyowon (fourth round)
11. (Hong Kong) Doo Hoi Kem (quarterfinals)
12. (Japan) Hitomi Sato (fourth round)
13. (North Korea) Kim Song-i (fourth round)
14. (Romania) Bernadette Szőcs (third round)
15. (Austria) Sofia Polcanova (third round)
16. (South Korea) Jeon Ji-hee (third round)
17. (Romania) Elizabeta Samara (third round)
18. (Japan) Miyu Kato (quarterfinals)
19. (Germany) Petrissa Solja (second round)
20. (Chinese Taipei) Chen Szu-yu (fourth round)
21. (Canada) Zhang Mo (third round)
22. (Netherlands) Li Jie (second round)
23. (Thailand) Suthasini Sawettabut (third round)
24. (China) Sun Yingsha (quarterfinals)
25. (Sweden) Matilda Ekholm (second round)
26. (Puerto Rico) Adriana Díaz (third round)
27. (Hungary) Georgina Póta (first round)
28. (Hong Kong) Lee Ho Ching (third round)
29. (Poland) Li Qian (third round)
30. (Hong Kong) Soo Wai Yam Minnie (fourth round)
31. (Netherlands) Britt Eerland (third round)
32. (United States) Yue Wu (third round)
33. (Luxembourg) Ni Xialian (first round)
34. (Egypt) Dina Meshref (second round)
35. (Russia) Polina Mikhaylova (first round)
36. (Germany) Nina Mittelham (second round)
37. (Slovakia) Barbora Balážová (first round)
38. (Singapore) Lin Ye (second round)
39. (Chinese Taipei) Cheng Hsien-tzu (third round)
40. (Spain) Maria Xiao (first round)
41. (Ukraine) Margaryta Pesotska (second round)
42. (India) Manika Batra (second round)
43. (Hong Kong) Ng Wing Nam (second round)
44. (Germany) Sabine Winter (first round)
45. (Czech Republic) Hana Matelová (second round)
46. (Russia) Yana Noskova (second round)
47. (Hungary) Szandra Pergel (second round)
48. (Ukraine) Ganna Gaponova (second round)
49. (Brazil) Bruna Takahashi (second round)
50. (Austria) Amelie Solja (second round)
51. (Austria) Liu Jia (second round)
52. (Poland) Natalia Partyka (second round)
53. (Hungary) Dóra Madarász (third round)
54. (Luxembourg) Sarah de Nutte (second round)
55. (United States) Lily Zhang (second round)
56. (Slovenia) Alex Galič (first round)
57. (Czech Republic) Dana Čechová (second round)
58. (South Korea) Lee Zion (second round)
59. (Spain) Galia Dvorak (first round)
60. (South Korea) Choi Hyo-joo (second round)
61. (North Korea) Cha Hyo-sim (fourth round)
62. (Sweden) Linda Bergström (second round)
63. (Ukraine) Tetyana Sorochynska (second round)
64. (France) Stéphanie Loeuillette (first round)

== Draw ==
=== Key ===
- Q = Qualifier
- w/o = Walkover
- w/d = Withdraw
- r = Retired
- DQ = Disqualified

=== Finals ===
Quarterfinals
1	(China) Ding Ning	11	4	11	11	11
8	(Japan) Miu Hirano	8	11	2	7	9
18	(Japan) Miyu Kato	9	11	4	6	5
4	(China) Liu Shiwen	11	8	11	11	11
3	(China) Wang Manyu	11	10	21	11	9	11
24	(China) Sun Yingsha	9	12	19	6	11	8
11	(Hong Kong) Doo Hoi Kem	11	7	7	11	10	4
2	(China) Chen Meng	9	11	11	8	12	11

Semifinals
1	(China) Ding Ning	11	11	5	5	0	2
4	(China) Liu Shiwen	6	9	11	11	11	11
3	(China) Wang Manyu	5	7	5	8
2	(China) Chen Meng	11	11	11	11

Final
4	(China) Liu Shiwen	9	11	11	7	11	11
2	(China) Chen Meng	11	7	7	11	0	9

=== Top half ===
==== Section 1 ====
First round
1	(China) Ding	11	11	11	11
(Egypt) Helmy	2	3	5	6
(Austria) Mischek	11	6	11	5	9	9
54	(Luxembourg) De Nutte	6	11	7	11	11	11
44	(Germany) Winter	11	15	9	11	11	8	6
(India) Mukherjee	8	17	11	5	6	11	11
(Italy) Vivarelli	4	6	8	8
26	(Puerto Rico) Díaz	11	11	11	11
19	(Germany) Solja	11	11	11	12
(Belgium) Marchetti	8	2	6	10
(Sweden) Källberg	6	11	8	4	9
39	(Chinese Taipei) Cheng	11	6	11	11	11
49	(Brazil) Takahashi	11	11	11	11
(Chile) Morales	9	6	7	5
(Colombia) Medina	7	2	1	5
10	(South Korea) Suh	11	11	11	11

Second round
1	(China) Ding	11	9	13	11	11
54	(Luxembourg) De Nutte	7	11	11	5	4
(India) Mukherjee	11	8	11	5	3	9
26	(Puerto Rico) Díaz	4	11	7	11	11	11
19	(Germany) Solja	12	9	7	7
39	(Chinese Taipei) Cheng	14	11	11	11
49	(Brazil) Takahashi	7	4	11	4	3
10	(South Korea) Suh	11	11	9	11	11

Third round
1	(China) Ding	11	11	11	11
26	(Puerto Rico) Díaz	1	8	2	5
39	(Chinese Taipei) Cheng	11	4	9	9
10	(South Korea) Suh	13	11	11	11

Fourth round
1	(China) Ding	11	11	5	11	11
10	(South Korea) Suh	6	9	11	6	9

==== Section 2 ====
First round
14	(Romania) Szőcs	11	11	11	11
(Chile) Ortega	2	5	9	1
(North Korea) Kim N-h	11	4	7	11	11	11
40	(Spain) Xiao	7	11	11	7	8	8
37	(Slovakia) Balážová	8	10	11	7	11	11	9
(Serbia) Lupulesku	11	12	5	11	7	6	11
(Bosnia and Herzegovina) Hadziahmetović	7	11	7	4	9
30	(Hong Kong) Soo	11	8	11	11	11
21	(Canada) Zhang	11	6	11	11	11
(Russia) Tailakova	7	11	8	8	7
(India) Kamath	11	11	19	8	6	7	4
34	(Egypt) Meshref	8	8	17	11	11	11	11
41	(Ukraine) Pesotska	11	11	11	11
(Thailand) Komwong	2	7	2	8
(North Korea) Kim J-h	7	6	11	3	9
8	(Japan) Hirano	11	11	9	11	11

Second round
14	(Romania) Szőcs	9	11	8	11	11	5	11
(North Korea) Kim N-h	11	8	11	5	5	11	8
(Serbia) Lupulesku	7	3	3	13	6
30	(Hong Kong) Soo	11	11	11	11	11
21	(Canada) Zhang	11	10	11	11	6	7	11
34	(Egypt) Meshref	7	12	6	4	11	11	3
41	(Ukraine) Pesotska	10	11	11	6	2	3
8	(Japan) Hirano	12	9	5	11	11	11

Third round
14	(Romania) Szőcs	4	12	5	6
30	(Hong Kong) Soo	11	14	11	11
21	(Canada) Zhang	6	11	13	11	4	4
8	(Japan) Hirano	11	13	11	7	11	11

Fourth round
30	(Hong Kong) Soo	8	6	11	11	4	7
8	(Japan) Hirano	11	11	8	7	11	11

==== Section 3 ====
First round
7	(Chinese Taipei) Cheng	11	7	11	9	11	11
(Hungary) Hartbrich	7	11	6	11	7	7
(Estonia) Avameri	9	5	11	3	9
36	(Germany) Mittelham	11	11	9	11	11
47	(Hungary) Pergel	12	11	11	14
(France) Chasselin	10	6	8	12
(Ukraine) Brateyko	5	9	6	9
18	(Japan) Kato	11	11	11	11
20	(Chinese Taipei) Chen	11	11	11	12
(Chile) Vega	4	4	4	10
(Serbia) Todorović	12	5	5	8
42	(India) Batra	14	11	11	11
43	(Hong Kong) Ng	12	9	12	11	11
(Iran) Shahsavari	10	11	10	6	5
(Belgium) Degraef	8	3	4	8
15	(Austria) Polcanova	11	11	11	11

Second round
7	(Chinese Taipei) Cheng	12	14	4	11	12
36	(Germany) Mittelham	10	12	11	2	10
47	(Hungary) Pergel	6	4	6	14	8
18	(Japan) Kato	11	11	11	12	11
20	(Chinese Taipei) Chen	11	11	7	11	11
42	(India) Batra	2	8	11	7	9
43	(Hong Kong) Ng	6	7	11	5	8
15	(Austria) Polcanova	11	11	6	11	11

Third round
7	(Chinese Taipei) Cheng	12	11	4	11	9	5
18	(Japan) Kato	14	8	11	8	11	11
20	(Chinese Taipei) Chen	13	16	11	11
15	(Austria) Polcanova	11	14	4	6

Fourth round
18	(Japan) Kato	11	11	11	11
20	(Chinese Taipei) Chen	7	6	7	7

==== Section 4 ====
First round
13	(North Korea) Kim S-i	11	11	11	11
(Belarus) Trigolos	8	6	7	6
(Netherlands) Vermaas	11	12	11	11	13	11
35	(Russia) Mikhaylova	4	10	13	8	15	7
33	(Luxembourg) Ni	9	11	11	9	8	11	8
(Serbia) Šurjan	11	4	6	11	11	3	11
(Chinese Taipei) Liu H-y	14	11	11	9	6	1
27	(Hungary) Póta	12	7	8	11	11	7
31	(Netherlands) Eerland	11	11	11	11
(Spain) Garcia	3	9	3	7
(Italy) Piccolin	4	6	7	7
46	(Russia) Noskova	11	11	11	11
45	(Czech Republic) Matelová	11	15	14	11
(Germany) Lang	9	13	12	7
(Belarus) Bogdanova	1	8	5	9
4	(China) Liu	11	11	11	11

Second round
13	(North Korea) Kim S-i	11	11	11	11
(Netherlands) Vermaas	5	5	7	2
(Serbia) Šurjan	10	11	4	12	10	6
(Chinese Taipei) Liu H-y	12	8	11	10	12	11
31	(Netherlands) Eerland	11	11	13	7	11
46	(Russia) Noskova	9	6	11	11	9
45	(Czech Republic) Matelová	2	6	10	4
4	(China) Liu	11	11	12	11

Third round
13	(North Korea) Kim S-i	11	11	11	11
(Chinese Taipei) Liu H-y	9	5	5	7
31	(Netherlands) Eerland	3	7	9	9
4	(China) Liu	11	11	11	11

Fourth round
13	(North Korea) Kim S-i	6	5	6	4
4	(China) Liu	11	11	11	11

=== Bottom half ===
==== Section 5 ====
First round
3	(China) Wang	11	11	11	11
(Cameroon) Hanffou	3	5	5	4
(Czech Republic) Adámková	11	9	13	11	11
59	(Spain) Dvorak	4	11	11	4	9
56	(Slovenia) Galič	11	9	10	5	9
(Finland) Kirichenko	7	11	12	11	11
(Italy) Colantoni	11	4	10	5	11	11	2
17	(Romania) Samara	4	11	12	11	9	7	11
32	(United States) Wu	11	11	11	12	11
(Russia) Malanina	13	8	7	10	3
(Romania) Ciobanu	11	8	9	11	7	11	11
64	(France) Loeuillette	9	11	11	6	11	5	2
57	(Czech Republic) Čechová	11	11	11	11
(Hungary) Fehér	9	9	8	9
(Brazil) Lin	3	5	3	5
12	(Japan) Sato	11	11	11	11

Second round
3	(China) Wang	11	11	11	11
(Czech Republic) Adámková	6	1	9	5
(Finland) Kirichenko	10	3	4	7
17	(Romania) Samara	12	11	11	11
32	(United States) Wu	16	11	13	5	11	11
(Romania) Ciobanu	18	9	11	11	5	6
57	(Czech Republic) Čechová	4	2	6	6
12	(Japan) Sato	11	11	11	11

Third round
3	(China) Wang	13	11	11	10	8	13
17	(Romania) Samara	11	3	9	12	11	11
32	(United States) Wu	7	7	7	12
12	(Japan) Sato	11	11	11	14

Fourth round
3	(China) Wang	9	11	11	8	11	11
12	(Japan) Sato	11	4	9	11	4	9

==== Section 6 ====
First round
16	(South Korea) Jeon	11	11	11	11
(Spain) Zhang	3	5	5	6
(Hong Kong) Zhu	8	13	6	6	8
63	(Ukraine) Sorochynska	11	11	11	11	11
61	(North Korea) Cha	11	11	11	11
(Slovakia) Kukulková	6	9	7	8
(Romania) Dodean	11	10	11	10	7	8
25	(Sweden) Ekholm	7	12	5	12	11	11
24	(China) Sun	8	11	14	11	11
(Luxembourg) Konsbruck	11	2	12	3	4
(Canada) Cote	11	4	8	1	9
51	(Austria) Liu	5	11	11	11	11
55	(United States) Zhang	11	11	11	11
(England) Tsaptsinos	7	9	5	3
(Czech Republic) Kučerová	6	6	5	7
6	(Japan) Ito	11	11	11	11

Second round
16	(South Korea) Jeon	11	11	14	11
63	(Ukraine) Sorochynska	5	5	12	1
61	(North Korea) Cha	6	11	7	11	11	9	12
25	(Sweden) Ekholm	11	6	11	7	6	11	10
24	(China) Sun	11	11	11	8	11
51	(Austria) Liu	9	5	8	11	6
55	(United States) Zhang	8	8	7	11	2
6	(Japan) Ito	11	11	11	6	11

Third round
16	(South Korea) Jeon	2	5	4	4
61	(North Korea) Cha	11	11	11	11
24	(China) Sun	11	11	11	13	11
6	(Japan) Ito	6	9	9	15	2

Fourth round
61	(North Korea) Cha	7	3	3	7
24	(China) Sun	11	11	11	11

==== Section 7 ====
First round
5	(Japan) Ishikawa	11	11	11	11
(Kazakhstan) Lavrova	6	3	3	5
(India) Patkar	11	9	6	11	7	11
50	(Austria) Solja	5	11	11	8	11	13
60	(South Korea) Choi	11	6	8	4	11	8
(Sweden) Bergand	8	11	11	11	6	11
(Chinese Taipei) Su	3	6	11	3	2
29	(Poland) Li	11	11	5	11	11
28	(Hong Kong) Lee	11	11	11	11
(Romania) Diaconu	4	5	5	6
(Egypt) El-Eraky	5	2	5	7
48	(Ukraine) Gaponova	11	11	11	11
58	(South Korea) Lee	8	8	11	13	11	5	11
(Wales) Carey	11	11	9	11	7	11	9
(South Korea) Yoo	11	6	14	7	7	16	9
11	(Hong Kong) Doo	7	11	12	11	11	14	11

Second round
5	(Japan) Ishikawa	11	9	11	11	11
50	(Austria) Solja	1	11	3	2	7
60	(South Korea) Choi	7	2	11	12	9	13	9
29	(Poland) Li	11	11	7	10	11	11	11
28	(Hong Kong) Lee	12	12	11	9	11
48	(Ukraine) Gaponova	10	10	8	11	2
58	(South Korea) Lee	6	4	5	14	11	6
11	(Hong Kong) Doo	11	11	11	12	7	11

Third round
5	(Japan) Ishikawa	11	14	11	11
29	(Poland) Li	7	12	3	4
28	(Hong Kong) Lee	10	11	8	11	7	5
11	(Hong Kong) Doo	12	7	11	7	11	11

Fourth round
5	(Japan) Ishikawa	6	6	11	9	11	11	9
11	(Hong Kong) Doo	11	11	7	11	4	6	11

==== Section 8 ====
First round
9	(Singapore) Feng	10	7	11	11	13	11
(United States) Wang	12	11	8	5	11	6
(Poland) Bajor	11	6	8	4	11	8
62	(Sweden) Bergström	8	11	11	11	6	11
53	(Hungary) Madarász	11	11	11	11
(Greece) Toliou	4	1	9	6
(Hungary) Bálint	11	5	10	1
22	(Netherlands) Li	13	11	12	11
23	(Thailand) Sawettabut	12	9	11	11	10	11
(France) Gasnier	10	11	4	6	12	5
(Croatia) Jeger	9	6	5	11	7
52	(Poland) Partyka	11	11	11	9	11
38	(Singapore) Lin	11	9	12	5	11	11
(England) Ho	3	11	10	11	7	4
(Singapore) Wong	9	9	5	5
2	(China) Chen	11	11	11	11

Second round
9	(Singapore) Feng	14	11	11	11	11
62	(Sweden) Bergström	16	8	8	8	7
53	(Hungary) Madarász	11	8	8	9	11	12	11
22	(Netherlands) Li	3	11	11	11	9	10	4
23	(Thailand) Sawettabut	11	11	11	11
52	(Poland) Partyka	8	4	8	8
38	(Singapore) Lin	6	4	7	8
2	(China) Chen	11	11	11	11

Third round
9	(Singapore) Feng	11	11	11	11
53	(Hungary) Madarász	7	4	8	8
23	(Thailand) Sawettabut	15	6	7	9	12
2	(China) Chen	13	11	11	11	14

Fourth round
9	(Singapore) Feng	10	6	6	13	7
2	(China) Chen	12	11	11	11	11
