= 2017 European Table Tennis Championships – Women's team =

The women's team tournament of the 2017 European Table Tennis Championships was held from 13 September to 17 September 2017.

All times are local (UTC+1)

== Medalists ==
Event	Gold	Silver	Bronze
Team	Romania; Elizabeta Samara; Daniela Dodean; Bernadette Szőcs; Adina Diaconu; Irina Ciobanu	Germany; Han Ying; Shan Xiaona; Nina Mittelham; Sabine Winter; Yuan Wan	Netherlands; Li Jie; Britt Eerland; Kim Vermaas; Rianne van Duin
Team	Romania; Elizabeta Samara; Daniela Dodean; Bernadette Szőcs; Adina Diaconu; Irina Ciobanu	Germany; Han Ying; Shan Xiaona; Nina Mittelham; Sabine Winter; Yuan Wan	Russia; Polina Mikhailova; Yana Noskova; Olga Vorobeva; Ekaterina Guseva; Mariia Tailakova

== Championship division ==
The top two teams of each group advanced.

=== Preliminary round ===
==== Group A ====
Team	Pld	W	L	GW	GL	Pts
Germany	3	3	0	9	2	6
Hungary	3	2	1	6	3	5
Sweden	3	1	2	4	7	4
Croatia	3	0	3	2	9	3

13 September 2017; 10:00	Report	Germany	3–1	Sweden
Score by game:
Han Ying	1–3	Li Fen
Shan Xiaona	3–2	Matilda Ekholm
Nina Mittelham	3–0	Linda Bergstrom
Han Ying	3–0	Matilda Ekholm

13 September 2017; 10:00	Report	Hungary	3–0	Croatia
Score by game:
Georgina Póta	3–0	Mirela Durak
Dóra Madarász	3–0	Dorina Srebrnjak
Szandra Pergel	3–0	Mateja Jeger

13 September 2017; 19:00	Report	Germany	3–0	Hungary
Score by game:
Han Ying	3–1	Dóra Madarász
Shan Xiaona	3–0	Szandra Pergel
Nina Mittelham	3–0	Mercedes Nagyvaradi

13 September 2017; 19:00	Report	Sweden	3–1	Croatia
Score by game:
Li Fen	3–0	Mirela Durak
Matilda Ekholm	2–3	Dorina Srebrnjak
Linda Bergstrom	3–2	Mateja Jeger
Li Fen	3–0	Dorina Srebrnjak

14 September 2017; 13:00	Report	Germany	3–1	Croatia
Score by game:
Sabine Winter	1–3	Mateja Jeger
Nina Mittelham	3–0	Dorina Srebrnjak
Yuan Wan	3–0	Mirela Durak
Sabine Winter	3–1	Dorina Srebrnjak

14 September 2017; 13:00	Report	Hungary	3–0	Sweden
Score by game:
Georgina Póta	3–2	Matilda Ekholm
Dóra Madarász	3–2	Li Fen
Szandra Pergel	3–2	Linda Bergstrom

==== Group B ====
Team	Pld	W	L	GW	GL	Pts
Romania	3	3	0	9	2	6
Netherlands	3	2	1	6	4	5
Luxembourg	3	1	2	5	7	4
Czech Republic	3	0	3	5	8	3

13 September 2017; 10:00	Report	Luxembourg	3–2	Czech Republic
Score by game:
Sarah De Nutte	1–3	Renata Strbikova
Ni Xialian	3–0	Iveta Vacenovská
Danielle Konsbruck	1–3	Hana Matelová
Sarah De Nutte	3–1	Iveta Vacenovská
Ni Xialian	3–1	Renata Strbikova
–

13 September 2017; 10:00	Report	Romania	3–0	Netherlands
Score by game:
Elizabeta Samara	3–0	Li Jie
Daniela Dodean	3–1	Britt Eerland
Bernadette Szőcs	3–2	Kim Vermaas

13 September 2017; 19:00	Report	Luxembourg	1–3	Netherlands
Score by game:
Sarah De Nutte	1–3	Britt Eerland
Ni Xialian	2–3	Li Jie
Danielle Konsbruck	3–2	Kim Vermaas
Sarah De Nutte	2–3	Li Jie

14 September 2017; 19:00	Report	Romania	3–1	Czech Republic
Score by game:
Elizabeta Samara	3–1	Renata Strbikova
Daniela Dodean	2–3	Hana Matelová
Bernadette Szőcs	3–0	Dana Čechová
Elizabeta Samara	3–1	Hana Matelová

14 September 2017; 16:00	Report	Netherlands	3–0	Czech Republic
Score by game:
Li Jie	3–0	Renata Strbikova
Britt Eerland	3–1	Hana Matelová
Kim Vermaas	3–2	Iveta Vacenovská

14 September 2017; 16:00	Report	Luxembourg	1–3	Romania
Score by game:
Ni Xialian	3–1	Daniela Dodean
Danielle Konsbruck	0–3	Elizabeta Samara
Sarah De Nutte	2–3	Bernadette Szőcs
Ni Xialian	0–3	Elizabeta Samara

==== Group C ====
Team	Pld	W	L	GW	GL	Pts
Austria	3	2	1	8	6	5
Portugal	3	2	1	8	6	5
Ukraine	3	1	2	6	6	4
Spain	3	1	2	4	8	4

13 September 2017; 10:00	Report	Ukraine	1–3	Austria
Score by game:
Tetyana Bilenko	0–3	Liu Jia
Ganna Gaponova	1–3	Sofia Polcanova
Margaryta Pesotska	3–0	Karoline Mischek
Tetyana Bilenko	0–3	Sofia Polcanova

13 September 2017; 10:00	Report	Spain	1–3	Portugal
Score by game:
Maria Xiao	0–3	Shao Jieni
Galia Dvorak	0–3	Yu Fu
Sara Ramírez	3–0	Leila Oliveira
Maria Xiao	1–3	Yu Fu

13 September 2017; 19:00	Report	Ukraine	3–0	Spain
Score by game:
Margaryta Pesotska	3–0	Galia Dvorak
Ganna Gaponova	3–2	Maria Xiao
Solomiya Brateyko	3–1	Sara Ramírez

13 September 2017; 19:00	Report	Portugal	2–3	Austria
Score by game:
Shao Jieni	0–3	Sofia Polcanova
Yu Fu	3–2	Liu Jia
Leila Oliveira	0–3	Amelie Solja
Shao Jieni	3–2	Liu Jia
Yu Fu	2–3	Sofia Polcanova
–

14 September 2017; 13:00	Report	Austria	2–3	Spain
Score by game:
Amelie Solja	3–0	Zhang Xuan
Karoline Mischek	1–3	Maria Xiao
Sofia Polcanova	3–0	Galia Dvorak
Amelie Solja	1–3	Sara Ramírez
Karoline Mischek	1–3	Zhang Xuan
–

14 September 2017; 13:00	Report	Portugal	3–2	Ukraine
Score by game:
Yu Fu	3–0	Margaryta Pesotska
Shao Jieni	2–3	Ganna Gaponova
Catia Martins	0–3	Solomiya Brateyko
Yu Fu	3–1	Ganna Gaponova
Shao Jieni	3–1	Margaryta Pesotska
–

==== Group D ====
Team	Pld	W	L	GW	GL	Pts
Russia	3	3	0	9	3	6
Poland	3	2	1	7	3	5
France	3	1	2	4	8	4
Belarus	3	0	3	3	9	3

13 September 2017; 10:00	Report	Poland	3–0	France
Score by game:
Natalia Partyka	3–0	Stéphanie Loeuillette
Katarzyna Grzybowska	3–2	Laura Gasnier
Li Qian	3–1	Judith Liu

13 September 2017; 10:00	Report	Belarus	1–3	Russia
Score by game:
Viktoria Pavlovich	3–2	Polina Mikhailova
Nadezhda Bogdanova	0–3	Olga Vorobeva
Daria Trigolos	0–3	Yana Noskova
Viktoria Pavlovich	2–3	Olga Vorobeva

13 September 2017; 19:00	Report	Belarus	2–3	France
Score by game:
Viktoria Pavlovich	3–2	Stéphanie Loeuillette
Nadezhda Bogdanova	1–3	Judith Liu
Daria Trigolos	0–3	Laura Gasnier
Viktoria Pavlovich	3–1	Judith Liu
Nadezhda Bogdanova	0–3	Stéphanie Loeuillette
–

13 September 2017; 19:00	Report	Russia	3–1	Poland
Score by game:
Polina Mikhailova	3–1	Katarzyna Grzybowska
Olga Vorobeva	3–0	Natalia Partyka
Yana Noskova	0–3	Li Qian
Polina Mikhailova	3–1	Natalia Partyka

14 September 2017; 16:00	Report	Belarus	0–3	Poland
Score by game:
Viktoria Pavlovich	0–3	Li Qian
Nadezhda Bogdanova	2–3	Natalia Partyka
Daria Trigolos	1–3	Katarzyna Grzybowska

14 September 2017; 16:00	Report	France	1–3	Russia
Score by game:
Laura Gasnier	1–3	Olga Vorobeva
Stéphanie Loeuillette	3–0	Polina Mikhailova
Audrey Zarif	1–3	Yana Noskova
Laura Gasnier	1–3	Polina Mikhailova

=== Knockout stage ===
==== Places 1–8 ====
Quarterfinals
Germany	3
Poland	0
Netherlands	3
Austria	2
Russia	3
Hungary	1
Portugal	0
Romania	3

Semifinals
Germany	3
Netherlands	2
Russia	0
Romania	3

Final
Germany	2
Romania	3

5th place bracket

Semifinals
Poland	1
Austria	3
Hungary	3
Portugal	1

5th place
Austria	2
Hungary	3
7th place
Poland	3
Portugal	0

===== Quarterfinals =====
15 September 2017; 13:00	Report	Germany	3–0	Poland
Score by game:
Han Ying	3–1	Li Qian
Shan Xiaona	3–0	Katarzyna Grzybowska
Nina Mittelham	3–1	Natalia Partyka

15 September 2017; 10:00	Report	Netherlands	3–2	Austria
Score by game:
Li Jie	3–2	Liu Jia
Britt Eerland	0–3	Sofia Polcanova
Kim Vermaas	1–3	Amelie Solja
Li Jie	3–0	Sofia Polcanova
Britt Eerland	3–0	Liu Jia
–

15 September 2017; 10:00	Report	Russia	3–1	Hungary
Score by game:
Polina Mikhailova	3–2	Dora Madarasz
Olga Vorobeva	2–3	Georgina Póta
Yana Noskova	3–1	Szandra Pergel
Polina Mikhailova	3–1	Georgina Póta

15 September 2017; 13:00	Report	Portugal	0–3	Romania
Score by game:
Yu Fu	2–3	Daniela Dodean
Shao Jieni	2–3	Elizabeta Samara
Leila Oliveira	0–3	Bernadette Szőcs

===== 5th-7th place =====
16 September 2017; 10:00	Poland	1–3	Austria

16 September 2017; 10:00	Hungary	3–1	Portugal

===== Semifinals =====
16 September 2017; 10:00	Report	Germany	3–2	Netherlands
Score by game:
Shan Xiaona	1–3	Li Jie
Han Ying	3–0	Britt Eerland
Nina Mittelham	2–3	Kim Vermaas
Han Ying	3–2	Li Jie
Shan Xiaona	3–1	Britt Eerland
–

16 September 2017; 13:00	Report	Russia	0–3	Romania
Score by game:
Yana Noskova	2–3	Elizabeta Samara
Polina Mikhailova	0–3	Daniela Dodean
Olga Vorobeva	1–3	Bernadette Szőcs

===== 7th place =====
16 September 2017; 19:00	Austria	2–3	Hungary

===== 5th place =====
16 September 2017; 19:00	Poland	3–0	Portugal

===== Final =====
17 September 2017; 14:00	Report	Germany	2–3	Romania
Score by game:
Han Ying	2–3	Elizabeta Samara
Shan Xiaona	3–0	Daniela Dodean
Nina Mittelham	1–3	Bernadette Szőcs
Shan Xiaona	3–1	Elizabeta Samara
Han Ying	1–3	Daniela Dodean
–

==== Places 9–16 ====
Quarterfinals
Sweden	3
Belarus	0
Czech Republic	3
Ukraine	0
Luxembourg	3
Croatia	0
Spain	0
France	3

Semifinals
Sweden	0
Czech Republic	3
Luxembourg	1
France	3

Final
Czech Republic	3
France	1
Third place
Sweden	0
Luxembourg	3

5th place bracket

Semifinals
Belarus	2
Ukraine	3
Croatia	3
Spain	1

13th place
Ukraine	3
Croatia	0
15th place
Belarus	3
Spain	2

===== Quarterfinals =====
15 September 2017; 13:00	Report	Sweden	3–0	Belarus
Score by game:
Matilda Ekholm	3–2	Viktoria Pavlovich
Li Fen	3–1	Nadezhda Bogdanova
Linda Bergstrom	3–0	Daria Trigolos

15 September 2017; 13:00	Report	Czech Republic	3–0	Ukraine
Score by game:
Hana Matelová	3–1	Solomiya Brateyko
Renata Strbikova	3–0	Ganna Gaponova
Iveta Vacenovská	3–0	Margaryta Pesotska

15 September 2017; 19:00	Report	Luxembourg	3–0	Croatia
Score by game:
Ni Xialian	3–0	Mateja Jeger
Sarah De Nutte	3–2	Dorina Srebrnjak
Danielle Konsbruck	3–2	Mirela Durak

15 September 2017; 13:00	Report	Spain	0–3	France
Score by game:
Maria Xiao	0–3	Laura Gasnier
Galia Dvorak	1–3	Stéphanie Loeuillette
Sara Ramirez	1–3	Audrey Zarif

===== 13th-15th place =====
16 September 2017; 13:00	Belarus	2–3	Ukraine

16 September 2017; 13:00	Croatia	3–1	Spain

===== Semifinals =====
16 September 2017; 13:00	Sweden	0–3	Czech Republic

16 September 2017; 13:00	Luxemburg	1–3	France

===== 15th place =====
16 September 2017; 19:00	Belarus	3–2	Spain

===== 13th place =====
16 September 2017; 19:00	Ukraine	3–0	Croatia

===== 11th place =====
16 September 2017; 19:00	Sweden	0–3	Luxembourg

===== 9th place =====
16 September 2017; 19:00	Czech Republic	3–1	France

== Standard Division ==
Team	Pld	W	L	GW	GL	Pts
Norway	5	5	0	15	3	10
Estonia	5	4	1	14	5	9
Bosnia and Herzegovina	5	3	2	10	8	8
Latvia	5	2	3	7	9	7
Scotland	5	1	4	5	13	6
Macedonia	5	0	5	2	15	5
