= 2019 European Table Tennis Championships – Women's team =

The women's team tournament of the 2019 European Table Tennis Championships will be held from 3 September to 8 September 2019.

== Preliminary round ==
The top team of each group advances.

=== Group A ===
Pos	Team	Pld	W	L	MF	MA	MD	Pts	Qualification	Romania	Spain	Slovakia
1	Romania	2	2	0	6	0	+6	4	Quarterfinals	—	3–0	3–0
2	Spain	2	1	1	3	3	0	3		0–3	—	3–0
3	Slovakia	2	0	2	0	6	−6	2		0–3	0–3	—

Updated to match(es) played on 7 September 2019. Source: ITTF
Rules for classification: 1) Points; 2) Head-to-head points; 3) Head-to-head matches; 4) Head-to-head sets

3 September 2019; 10:00	Report	Spain	3–0	Slovakia	Salle Sportive Métropolitaine, Nantes
Score by game:
Maria Xiao	3–1	Nicoleta Puchovanová
Galia Dvorak	3–2	Barbora Balážová
Xuan Zhang	3–0	Ema Labošová

4 September 2019; 19:00	Report	Romania	3–0	Slovakia	Salle Sportive Métropolitaine, Nantes
Score by game:
Bernadette Szőcs	3–0	Ema Labošová
Elizabeta Samara	3–0	Eva Jurková
Daniela Monteiro Dodean	3–0	Walkover

5 September 2019; 16:00	Report	Romania	3–0	Spain	Salle Sportive Métropolitaine, Nantes
Score by game:
Bernadette Szőcs	3–0	Galia Dvorak
Elizabeta Samara	3–2	Maria Xiao
Daniela Monteiro Dodean	3–1	Xuan Zhang

=== Group B ===
Pos	Team	Pld	W	L	MF	MA	MD	Pts	Qualification	Germany	Italy	Slovenia
1	Germany	2	2	0	6	0	+6	4	Quarterfinals	—	3–0	3–0
2	Italy	2	1	1	3	4	−1	3		0–3	—	3–1
3	Slovenia	2	0	2	1	6	−5	2		0–3	1–3	—

Updated to match(es) played on 7 September 2019. Source: ITTF
Rules for classification: 1) Points; 2) Head-to-head points; 3) Head-to-head matches; 4) Head-to-head sets

3 September 2019; 19:00	Report	Slovenia	1–3	Italy	Salle Sportive Métropolitaine, Nantes
Score by game:
Katarina Stražar	3–0	Giorgia Piccolin
Aleksandra Vovk	0–3	Debora Vivarelli
Lea Paulin	0–3	Jamila Laurenti
Katarina Stražar	2–3	Debora Vivarelli

4 September 2019; 19:00	Report	Germany	3–0	Slovenia	Salle Sportive Métropolitaine, Nantes
Score by game:
Shan Xiaona	3–0	Ana Tofant
Nina Mittelham	3–1	Katarina Stražar
Wan Yuan	3–0	Lea Paulin

5 September 2019; 16:00	Report	Germany	3–0	Italy	Salle Sportive Métropolitaine, Nantes
Score by game:
Han Ying	3–0	Debora Vivarelli
Petrissa Solja	3–2	Giorgia Piccolin
Nina Mittelham	3–0	Jamila Laurenti

=== Group C ===
Pos	Team	Pld	W	L	MF	MA	MD	Pts	Qualification	Hungary	Belgium	Belarus
1	Hungary	2	2	0	6	0	+6	4	Quarterfinals	—	3–0	3–0
2	Belgium	2	1	1	3	4	−1	3		0–3	—	3–1
3	Belarus	2	0	2	1	6	−5	2		0–3	1–3	—

Updated to match(es) played on 7 September 2019. Source: ITTF
Rules for classification: 1) Points; 2) Head-to-head points; 3) Head-to-head matches; 4) Head-to-head sets

3 September 2019; 16:00	Report	BEL	3–1	Belarus	Salle Sportive Métropolitaine, Nantes
Score by game:
Lisa Lung	3–1	Alina Nikitchanka
Margo Degraef	3–1	Daria Trigolos
Nathalie Marchetti	2–3	Nadezhda Bogdanova
Lisa Lung	3–2	Daria Trigolos

4 September 2019; 13:00	Report	Hungary	3–0	Belgium	Salle Sportive Métropolitaine, Nantes
Score by game:
Georgina Póta	3–0	Margo Degraef
Dóra Madarász	3–1	Lisa Lung
Szandra Pergel	3–1	Nathalie Marchetti

5 September 2019; 10:00	Report	Hungary	3–0	Belarus	Salle Sportive Métropolitaine, Nantes
Score by game:
Georgina Póta	3–0	Katsiaryna Baravok
Dóra Madarász	3–1	Daria Trigolos
Szandra Pergel	3–2	Nadezhda Bogdanova

=== Group D ===
Pos	Team	Pld	W	L	MF	MA	MD	Pts	Qualification	Netherlands	Czech Republic	Serbia
1	Netherlands	2	2	0	6	2	+4	4	Quarterfinals	—	3–1	3–1
2	Czech Republic	2	1	1	4	4	0	3		1–3	—	3–1
3	Serbia	2	0	2	2	6	−4	2		1–3	1–3	—

Updated to match(es) played on 7 September 2019. Source: ITTF
Rules for classification: 1) Points; 2) Head-to-head points; 3) Head-to-head matches; 4) Head-to-head sets

3 September 2019; 16:00	Report	Serbia	1–3	Czech Republic	Salle Sportive Métropolitaine, Nantes
Score by game:
Andrea Todorović	3–2	Dana Čechová
Sabina Šurjan	0–3	Hana Matelová
Izabela Lupulesku	1–3	Karin Adámková
Andrea Todorović	1–3	Hana Matelová

4 September 2019; 13:00	Report	Serbia	1–3	Netherlands	Salle Sportive Métropolitaine, Nantes
Score by game:
Izabela Lupulesku	2–3	Britt Eerland
Andrea Todorović	0–3	Li Jie
Tijana Jokić	3–0	Kim Vermaas
Izabela Lupulesku	0–3	Li Jie

5 September 2019; 10:00	Report	Netherlands	3–1	Czech Republic	Salle Sportive Métropolitaine, Nantes
Score by game:
Li Jie	3–0	Dana Čechová
Britt Eerland	3–0	Hana Matelová
Kim Vermaas	0–3	Karin Adámková
Li Jie	3–0	Hana Matelová

=== Group E ===
Pos	Team	Pld	W	L	MF	MA	MD	Pts	Qualification	Ukraine	Austria	Bulgaria
1	Ukraine	2	2	0	6	3	+3	4	Quarterfinals	—	3–2	3–1
2	Austria	2	1	1	5	4	+1	3		2–3	—	3–1
3	Bulgaria	2	0	2	2	6	−4	2		1–3	1–3	—

Updated to match(es) played on 7 September 2019. Source: ITTF
Rules for classification: 1) Points; 2) Head-to-head points; 3) Head-to-head matches; 4) Head-to-head sets

3 September 2019; 13:00	Report	Austria	3–1	Bulgaria	Salle Sportive Métropolitaine, Nantes
Score by game:
Sofia Polcanova	3–1	Polina Trifonova
Liu Jia	2–3	Maria Yovkova
Amelie Solja	3–0	Kalina Hristova
Sofia Polcanova	3–0	Maria Yovkova

4 September 2019; 10:00	Report	Bulgaria	1–3	Ukraine	Salle Sportive Métropolitaine, Nantes
Score by game:
Polina Trifonova	3–2	Ganna Gaponova
Maria Yovkova	0–3	Margaryta Pesotska
Ivet Ilieva	0–3	Tetyana Bilenko
Polina Trifonova	0–3	Margaryta Pesotska

5 September 2019; 19:00	Report	Ukraine	3–2	Austria	Salle Sportive Métropolitaine, Nantes
5 September 2019; 19:00	Report	Score by game:			Salle Sportive Métropolitaine, Nantes
5 September 2019; 19:00	Report	Margaryta Pesotska	3–2	Liu Jia	Salle Sportive Métropolitaine, Nantes
Ganna Gaponova			0–3	Sofia Polcanova
Tetyana Bilenko			3–2	Amelie Solja
Margaryta Pesotska			0–3	Sofia Polcanova
Ganna Gaponova			3–1	Liu Jia
			–

=== Group F ===
Pos	Team	Pld	W	L	MF	MA	MD	Pts	Qualification	Poland	Sweden	Turkey
1	Poland	2	2	0	6	1	+5	4	Quarterfinals	—	3–1	3–0
2	Sweden	2	1	1	4	3	+1	3		1–3	—	3–0
3	Turkey	2	0	2	0	6	−6	2		0–3	0–3	—

Updated to match(es) played on 7 September 2019. Source: ITTF
Rules for classification: 1) Points; 2) Head-to-head points; 3) Head-to-head matches; 4) Head-to-head sets

3 September 2019; 13:00	Report	Turkey	0–3	Poland	Salle Sportive Métropolitaine, Nantes
Score by game:
Sibel Altınkaya	0–3	Li Qian
Özge Yılmaz	0–3	Natalia Partyka
Ece Haraç	1–3	Natalia Bajor

4 September 2019; 10:00	Report	Turkey	0–3	Sweden	Salle Sportive Métropolitaine, Nantes
Score by game:
Sibel Altınkaya	1–3	Linda Bergström
Gülpembe Özkaya	1–3	Matilda Ekholm
Özge Yılmaz	2–3	Christina Källberg

5 September 2019; 13:00	Report	Sweden	1–3	Poland	Salle Sportive Métropolitaine, Nantes
Score by game:
Matilda Ekholm	3–1	Natalia Partyka
Linda Bergström	1–3	Li Qian
Christina Källberg	1–3	Natalia Bajor
Matilda Ekholm	0–3	Li Qian

=== Group G ===
Pos	Team	Pld	W	L	MF	MA	MD	Pts	Qualification	Portugal	Russia	Croatia
1	Portugal	2	2	0	6	3	+3	4	Quarterfinals	—	3–2	3–1
2	Russia	2	1	1	5	3	+2	3		2–3	—	3–0
3	Croatia	2	0	2	1	6	−5	2		1–3	0–3	—

Updated to match(es) played on 7 September 2019. Source: ITTF
Rules for classification: 1) Points; 2) Head-to-head points; 3) Head-to-head matches; 4) Head-to-head sets

3 September 2019; 19:00	Report	Russia	3–0	Croatia	Salle Sportive Métropolitaine, Nantes
Score by game:
Polina Mikhaylova	3–2	Ivana Tubikaneć
Yana Noskova	3–2	Ivana Malobabić
Mariia Tailakova	3–1	Mateja Jeger

4 September 2019; 16:00	Report	Portugal	3–1	Croatia	Salle Sportive Métropolitaine, Nantes
Score by game:
Fu Yu	3–0	Petra Petek
Shao Jieni	3–0	Ivana Tubikaneć
Leila Oliveira	2–3	Mateja Jeger
Fu Yu	3–0	Ivana Tubikaneć

5 September 2019; 13:00	Report	Portugal	3–2	Russia	Salle Sportive Métropolitaine, Nantes
5 September 2019; 13:00	Report	Score by game:			Salle Sportive Métropolitaine, Nantes
5 September 2019; 13:00	Report	Shao Jieni	1–3	Polina Mikhaylova	Salle Sportive Métropolitaine, Nantes
Fu Yu			3–0	Yana Noskova
Leila Oliveira			0–3	Olga Vorobeva
Fu Yu			3–0	Polina Mikhaylova
Shao Jieni			3–1	Yana Noskova
			–

=== Group H ===
Pos	Team	Pld	W	L	MF	MA	MD	Pts	Qualification	France	Luxembourg	Greece
1	France	2	2	0	6	3	+3	4	Quarterfinals	—	3–2	3–1
2	Luxembourg	2	1	1	5	4	+1	3		2–3	—	3–1
3	Greece	2	0	2	2	6	−4	2		1–3	1–3	—

Updated to match(es) played on 7 September 2019. Source: ITTF
Rules for classification: 1) Points; 2) Head-to-head points; 3) Head-to-head matches; 4) Head-to-head sets

3 September 2019; 10:00	Report	Greece	1–3	Luxembourg	Salle Sportive Métropolitaine, Nantes
Score by game:
Aikaterini Toliou	0–3	Ni Xialian
Elisavet Terpou	1–3	Sarah de Nutte
Konstantina Paridi	3–0	Tessy Gonderinger
Aikaterini Toliou	1–3	Sarah de Nutte

4 September 2019; 16:00	Report	France	3–1	Greece	Salle Sportive Métropolitaine, Nantes
Score by game:
Laura Gasnier	3–1	Maria Christoforaki
Stéphanie Loeuillette	1–3	Aikaterini Toliou
Audrey Zarif	3–1	Konstantina Paridi
Laura Gasnier	3–0	Aikaterini Toliou

5 September 2019; 19:00	Report	France	3–2	Luxembourg	Salle Sportive Métropolitaine, Nantes
5 September 2019; 19:00	Report	Score by game:			Salle Sportive Métropolitaine, Nantes
5 September 2019; 19:00	Report	Laura Gasnier	3–2	Sarah de Nutte	Salle Sportive Métropolitaine, Nantes
Pauline Chasselin			0–3	Ni Xialian
Audrey Zarif			3–1	Tessy Gonderinger
Laura Gasnier			0–3	Ni Xialian
Marie Migot			3–2	Sarah de Nutte
			–

== Knockout stage ==
Quarterfinals
6 September
Romania	3
France	0
6 September
Poland	3
Netherlands	1
6 September
Hungary	3
Ukraine	2
6 September
Portugal	3
Germany	2

Semifinals
7 September
Romania	3
Poland	1
7 September
Hungary	1
Portugal	3

Final
8 September
Romania	3
Portugal	0

=== Quarterfinals ===
6 September 2019; 16:00	Report	Romania	3–0	France
Score by game:
Elizabeta Samara	3–0	Laura Gasnier
Bernadette Szőcs	3–1	Marie Migot
Daniela Monteiro Dodean	3–0	Audrey Zafir

6 September 2019; 10:00	Report	Poland	3–1	Netherlands
Score by game:
Li Qian	3–0	Britt Eerland
Natalia Partyka	0–3	Li Jie
Natalia Bajor	3–0	Kim Vermaas
Li Qian	3–0	Li Jie

6 September 2019; 19:00	Report	Ukraine	2–3	Hungary
Score by game:
Margaryta Pesotska	2–3	Georgina Póta
Ganna Gaponova	0–3	Dóra Madarász
Tetyana Bilenko	3–1	Szandra Pergel
Margaryta Pesotska	3–0	Dóra Madarász
Ganna Gaponova	0–3	Georgina Póta
–

6 September 2019; 19:00	Report	Portugal	3–2	Germany
Score by game:
Shao Jieni	1–3	Han Ying
Fu Yu	3–2	Petrissa Solja
Rita Fins	0–3	Shan Xiaona
Fu Yu	3–1	Nina Mittelham
Shao Jieni	3–2	Petrissa Solja
–

=== Semifinals ===
7 September 2019; 10:00	Report	Romania	3–1	Poland
Score by game:
Elizabeta Samara	3–1	Natalia Partyka
Daniela Monteiro Dodean	0–3	Li Qian
Bernadette Szőcs	3–1	Natalia Bajor
Elizabeta Samara	3–0	Li Qian

7 September 2019; 13:00	Report	Portugal	3–1	Hungary
Score by game:
Fu Yu	3–0	Dóra Madarász
Shao Jieni	3–1	Georgina Póta
Leila Oliveira	1–3	Szandra Pergel
Fu Yu	3–1	Georgina Póta

=== Finals ===
8 September 2019; 13:00	Report	Romania	3–0	Portugal
Score by game:
Bernadette Szőcs	3–2	Shao Jieni
Daniela Monteiro Dodean	3–2	Fu Yu
Elizabeta Samara	3–0	Leila Oliveira
