= 2019 World Table Tennis Championships – Women's doubles =

Women's doubles at the 2019 World Table Tennis Championships
- Venue: Hungexpo
- Location: Budapest, Hungary
- Dates: 22–28 April
- Final score: 8–11, 3–11, 11–8, 11–3, 12–10, 11–8

Medalists
gold medal	Sun Yingsha; Wang Manyu	China
silver medal	Hina Hayata; Mima Ito	Japan
bronze medal	Honoka Hashimoto; Hitomi Sato	Japan
bronze medal	Chen Meng; Zhu Yuling	China

The women's doubles competition of the 2019 World Table Tennis Championships was held from 22 to 28 April 2019. Ding Ning and Liu Shiwen were the defending champions but neither of them competed this year.

Sun Yingsha and Wang Manyu won the final by defeating Hina Hayata and Mima Ito 8–11, 3–11, 11–8, 11–,3, 12–10, 11–8.

== Seeds ==
1. (Japan) Hina Hayata / (Japan) Mima Ito (final)
2. (China) Sun Yingsha / (China) Wang Manyu (champions)
3. (Japan) Honoka Hashimoto / (Japan) Hitomi Sato (semifinals)
4. (China) Chen Meng / (China) Zhu Yuling (semifinals)
5. (Hong Kong) Doo Hoi Kem / (Hong Kong) Lee Ho Ching (quarterfinals)
6. (Hong Kong) Ng Wing Nam / (Hong Kong) Soo Wai Yam Minnie (third round)
7. (Slovakia) Barbora Balážová / (Czech Republic) Hana Matelová (first round)
8. (Romania) Elizabeta Samara / (Romania) Bernadette Szőcs (third round)
9. (South Korea) Jeon Ji-hee / (South Korea) Lee Zion (third round)
10. (Sweden) Matilda Ekholm / (Hungary) Georgina Póta (second round)
11. (United States) Yue Wu / (United States) Lily Zhang (second round)
12. (Chinese Taipei) Cheng Hsien-tzu / (Chinese Taipei) Liu Hsing-yin (quarterfinals)
13. (Hungary) Dóra Madarász / (Hungary) Szandra Pergel (third round)
14. (Germany) Kristin Lang / (Germany) Nina Mittelham (second round)
15. (North Korea) Cha Hyo-sim / (North Korea) Kim Nam-hae (quarterfinals)
16. (Russia) Yana Noskova / (Austria) Sofia Polcanova (second round)
17. (Luxembourg) Sarah de Nutte / (Luxembourg) Ni Xialian (second round)
18. (India) Manika Batra / (India) Archana Girish Kamath (second round)
19. (Poland) Natalia Bajor / (Poland) Natalia Partyka (second round)
20. (Spain) Maria Xiao / (Canada) Zhang Mo (second round)
21. (Egypt) Farah Abdel-Aziz / (Egypt) Reem El-Eraky (second round)
22. (Germany) Chantal Mantz / (Germany) Sabine Winter (third round)
23. (Egypt) Yousra Helmy / (Egypt) Dina Meshref (third round)
24. (Poland) Li Qian / (Netherlands) Li Jie (third round)
25. (Australia) Michelle Bromley / (Australia) Melissa Tapper (first round)
26. (Singapore) Lin Ye / (Singapore) Zhang Wanling (first round)
27. (Chinese Taipei) Chen Szu-yu / (Chinese Taipei) Cheng I-ching (third round)
28. (Thailand) Orawan Paranang / (Thailand) Suthasini Sawettabut (second round)
29. (Spain) Galia Dvorak / (Spain) Zhang Sofia-Xuan (first round)
30. (Puerto Rico) Adriana Díaz / (Puerto Rico) Melanie Díaz (second round)
31. (France) Pauline Chasselin / (France) Laura Gasnier (second round)
32. (Romania) Adina Diaconu / (Romania) Daniela Dodean (second round)

== Draw ==
=== Key ===
- Q = Qualifier
- w/o = Walkover
- w/d = Withdraw
- r = Retired
- DQ = Disqualified

=== Finals ===
Semifinals									Final
1	(Japan) Hina Hayata (Japan) Mima Ito	11	10	14	11	11	11
3	(Japan) Honoka Hashimoto (Japan) Hitomi Sato	9	12	16	5	5	7		1	(Japan) Hina Hayata (Japan) Mima Ito	11	11	8	3	10	8
4	(China) Chen Meng (China) Zhu Yuling	3	9	11	11	6	11	5	2	(China) Sun Yingsha (China) Wang Manyu	8	3	11	11	12	11
2	(China) Sun Yingsha (China) Wang Manyu	11	11	9	6	11	9	11

=== Top half ===
==== Section 1 ====
First round
1	(Japan) Hayata (Japan) Ito	11	11	11	11
(Croatia) Cakol (Croatia) Tubikanec	6	6	9	5
(India) Mukherjee (India) Patkar	2	11	13	8	8
20	(Spain) Xiao (Canada) Zhang	11	6	15	11	11
27	(Chinese Taipei) Chen (Chinese Taipei) Cheng I.	11	11	11	11
(Russia) Malanina (Russia) Mikhailova	8	7	8	9
(Italy) Laurenti (Italy) Vivarelli	5	5	3	11	6
14	(Germany) Lang (Germany) Mittelham	11	11	11	8	11
15	(North Korea) Cha (North Korea) Kim	11	11	11	11
(Norway) Carlsen (Norway) Doval	8	4	6	3
(Finland) Kirichenko (Finland) Lundstrom	10	3	9	4
28	(Thailand) Paranang (Thailand) Sawettabut	12	11	11	11
30	(Puerto Rico) A. Díaz (Puerto Rico) M. Díaz	11	11	11	9	11
(Lithuania) Melaikaite (Lithuania) Riliskyte	9	9	8	11	6
(Brazil) Gui (Brazil) Yamada	4	3	5	7
8	(Romania) Samara (Romania) Szőcs	11	11	11	11

Second round
1	(Japan) Hayata (Japan) Ito	11	10	11	11	11
20	(Spain) Xiao (Canada) Zhang	4	12	7	9	4
27	(Chinese Taipei) Chen (Chinese Taipei) Cheng I.	8	11	11	11	4	11
14	(Germany) Lang (Germany) Mittelham	11	9	4	7	11	4
15	(North Korea) Cha (North Korea) Kim	11	7	11	11	11
28	(Thailand) Paranang (Thailand) Sawettabut	8	11	8	9	5
30	(Puerto Rico) A. Díaz (Puerto Rico) M. Díaz	8	11	11	9	9	8
8	(Romania) Samara (Romania) Szőcs	11	3	7	11	11	11

Third round
1	(Japan) Hayata (Japan) Ito	11	11	11	11
27	(Chinese Taipei) Chen (Chinese Taipei) Cheng I.	8	7	2	8
15	(North Korea) Cha (North Korea) Kim	11	12	7	11	11
8	(Romania) Samara (Romania) Szőcs	7	10	11	9	4

Quarterfinals
1	(Japan) Hayata (Japan) Ito	11	11	11	9	11
15	(North Korea) Cha (North Korea) Kim	6	8	9	11	9

==== Section 2 ====
First round
7	(Slovakia) Balážová (Czech Republic) Matelová	5	9	11	3	13	11	7
(Brazil) Takahashi (Serbia) Todorović	11	11	9	11	11	6	11
(Colombia) Medina (Colombia) Perdomo	0	6	10	5
22	(Germany) Mantz (Germany) Winter	11	11	12	11
25	(Australia) Bromley (Australia) Tapper	5	13	9	3
(Italy) Colantoni (Italy) Piccolin	11	15	11	11
(Belgium) Degraef (Belgium) Lung	9	5	9	4
12	(Chinese Taipei) Cheng H. (Chinese Taipei) Liu	11	11	11	11
9	(South Korea) Jeon (South Korea) Lee	11	11	7	11	11
(Thailand) Komwong (Thailand) Sawettabut	7	6	11	5	8
(Iran) Ashtari (Iran) Shahsavari	7	8	4	4
19	(Poland) Bajor (Poland) Partyka	11	11	11	11
18	(India) Batra (India) Kamath	11	11	11	11
(Greece) Paridi (Greece) Toliou	5	6	6	7
(Belarus) Bogdanova (Belarus) Trigolos	11	17	9	4	3
3	(Japan) Hashimoto (Japan) Sato	6	19	11	11	11

Second round
(Brazil) Takahashi (Serbia) Todorović	12	7	4	7	11	9
22	(Germany) Mantz (Germany) Winter	10	11	11	11	8	11
(Italy) Colantoni (Italy) Piccolin	5	5	3	9
12	(Chinese Taipei) Cheng H. (Chinese Taipei) Liu	11	11	11	11
9	(South Korea) Jeon (South Korea) Lee	11	12	11	11
19	(Poland) Bajor (Poland) Partyka	8	10	8	6
18	(India) Batra (India) Kamath	3	7	7	4
3	(Japan) Hashimoto (Japan) Sato	11	11	11	11

Third round
22	(Germany) Mantz (Germany) Winter	8	11	5	4	5
12	(Chinese Taipei) Cheng H. (Chinese Taipei) Liu	11	9	11	11	11
9	(South Korea) Jeon (South Korea) Lee	9	8	10	10
3	(Japan) Hashimoto (Japan) Sato	11	11	12	12

Quarterfinals
12	(Chinese Taipei) Cheng H. (Chinese Taipei) Liu	9	2	8	2
3	(Japan) Hashimoto (Japan) Sato	11	11	11	11

=== Bottom half ===
==== Section 3 ====
First round
4	(China) Chen (China) Zhu	11	11	11	11
(Bosnia and Herzegovina) Busatlic (Bosnia and Herzegovina) Hadziahmetovic	3	2	3	4
(Serbia) Lupulesku (Serbia) Šurjan	11	7	9	3	15	7
17	(Luxembourg) De Nutte (Luxembourg) Ni	8	11	11	11	13	11
24	(Poland) Li (Netherlands) Li	11	11	11	11	11
(Austria) Liu (Austria) Solja	7	13	5	3	7
(Singapore) Goi (Singapore) Wong	13	8	7	2	4
10	(Sweden) Ekholm (Hungary) Póta	11	11	11	11	11
11	(United States) Wu (United States) Zhang	11	11	5	11	11
(Ukraine) Bilenko (Ukraine) Gaponova	2	9	11	4	8
(Argentina) Arguelles (Argentina) Codina	11	7	4	7	10
23	(Egypt) Helmy (Egypt) Meshref	6	11	11	11	12
26	(Singapore) Lin (Singapore) Zhang	11	6	9	8	9
(Cameroon) Hanffou (Switzerland) Moret	3	11	11	11	11
(South Korea) Choi (South Korea) Yoo	8	11	13	11	6	4
5	(Hong Kong) Doo (Hong Kong) Lee	11	13	11	6	11	11

Second round
4	(China) Chen (China) Zhu	11	11	11	11
17	(Luxembourg) De Nutte (Luxembourg) Ni	3	6	5	4
24	(Poland) Li (Netherlands) Li	11	11	11	11	11
10	(Sweden) Ekholm (Hungary) Póta	13	9	9	9	7
11	(United States) Wu (United States) Zhang	7	11	11	6	12	5
23	(Egypt) Helmy (Egypt) Meshref	11	4	3	11	14	11
(Cameroon) Hanffou (Switzerland) Moret	8	8	2	5
5	(Hong Kong) Doo (Hong Kong) Lee	11	11	11	11

Third round
4	(China) Chen (China) Zhu	8	11	7	11	11	11
24	(Poland) Li (Netherlands) Li	11	2	11	4	3	4
23	(Egypt) Helmy (Egypt) Meshref	6	3	5	6
5	(Hong Kong) Doo (Hong Kong) Lee	11	11	11	11

Quarterfinals
4	(China) Chen (China) Zhu	11	11	11	11
5	(Hong Kong) Doo (Hong Kong) Lee	4	4	9	6

==== Section 4 ====
First round
6	(Hong Kong) Ng (Hong Kong) Soo	11	11	11	6	11
(Sweden) Bergand (Sweden) Bergstrom	1	6	5	11	4
(Scotland) Khalid (Scotland) Plaistow	4	2	7	1
32	(Romania) Diaconu (Romania) Dodean	11	11	11	11
29	(Spain) Dvorak (Spain) Zhang	10	7	3	8
(North Korea) Kim J. (North Korea) Kim S.	12	11	11	11
(Netherlands) Eerland (Netherlands) Vermaas	4	12	1	11	7	11	5
16	(Russia) Noskova (Austria) Polcanova	11	10	11	7	11	4	11
13	(Hungary) Madarász (Hungary) Pergel	11	11	4	3	10	12	11
(Estonia) Avameri (Austria) Mischek	7	3	11	11	12	10	4
(Slovakia) Kukulkova (Slovakia) Ódorová	9	6	11	5	9
31	(France) Chasselin (France) Gasnier	11	11	8	11	11
21	(Egypt) Abdel-Aziz (Egypt) El-Eraky	11	11	6	11	12
(Chile) Morales (Chile) Vega	3	7	11	5	10
(Czech Republic) Adamkova (Czech Republic) Kucerova	4	5	6	4
2	(China) Sun (China) Wang	11	11	11	11

Second round
6	(Hong Kong) Ng (Hong Kong) Soo	9	10	11	3	11	12	11
32	(Romania) Diaconu (Romania) Dodean	11	12	9	11	8	10	3
(North Korea) Kim J. (North Korea) Kim S.	11	11	11	11
16	(Russia) Noskova (Austria) Polcanova	9	6	6	6
13	(Hungary) Madarász (Hungary) Pergel	14	7	10	8	11	11	11
31	(France) Chasselin (France) Gasnier	12	11	12	11	5	5	7
21	(Egypt) Abdel-Aziz (Egypt) El-Eraky	4	11	5	6
2	(China) Sun (China) Wang	11	13	11	11

Third round
6	(Hong Kong) Ng (Hong Kong) Soo	10	13	7	12	4	6
(North Korea) Kim J. (North Korea) Kim S.	12	11	11	10	11	11
13	(Hungary) Madarász (Hungary) Pergel	7	8	11	10	8
2	(China) Sun (China) Wang	11	11	8	12	11

Quarterfinals
(North Korea) Kim J. (North Korea) Kim S.	8	8	11	10	11	6
2	(China) Sun (China) Wang	11	11	9	12	2	11
