= Table tennis at the 2019 European Games – Women's team =

Table tennis – Women's team at the 2019 European Games
- Venue: Tennis Olympic Centre
- Date: 27–29 June
- Competitors: 37 from 12 nations

Medalists
gold medal	Han Ying; Nina Mittelham; Shan Xiaona; Petrissa Solja	Germany
silver medal	Bernadette Szőcs; Daniela Dodean; Elizabeta Samara	Romania
bronze medal	Li Qian; Natalia Bajor; Natalia Partyka	Poland

The women's team competition in table tennis at the 2019 European Games in Minsk is the second edition of the event in a European Games. It was held at the Tennis Olympic Centre from 27 to 29 June 2019.

== Schedule ==
All times are FET (UTC+03:00)

Date	Time	Event
Thursday, 27 June 2019	10:00	First round
Thursday, 27 June 2019	16:00	Quarterfinals
Friday, 28 June 2019	10:00	Semifinals
Saturday, 29 June 2019	10:00	Bronze medal match
Saturday, 29 June 2019	13:00	Gold medal match

== Seeds ==
The seeding lists were announced on 8 June 2019.

1. Germany (GER)
2. Romania (ROU)
3. Hungary (HUN)
4. Austria (AUT)
5. Netherlands (NED)
6. Ukraine (UKR)
7. Poland (POL)
8. Spain (ESP)
9. Luxembourg (LUX)
10. Russia (RUS)
11. Sweden (SWE)
12. Belarus (BLR)

== Results ==
First round
12	Belarus	0
5	Netherlands	3
7	Poland	3
10	Russia	0
9	Luxembourg	1
6	Ukraine	3
8	Spain	1
11	Sweden	3

Quarterfinals
1	Germany	3
5	Netherlands	1
7	Poland	3
4	Austria	1
3	Hungary	3
6	Ukraine	0
11	Sweden	1
2	Romania	3

Semifinals
1	Germany	3
7	Poland	2
3	Hungary	2
2	Romania	3

Gold Medal Match
1	Germany	3
2	Romania	0
Bronze Medal Match
7	Poland	3
3	Hungary	2

=== First round ===
27 June 2019	Belarus	0 – 3	Netherlands

Daria Trigolos / Nadezhda Bogdanova	1–3	Kim Vermaas / Britt Eerland	11–9, 9–11, 8–11, 9–11
Viktoryia Paulovich	1–3	Li Jie	4–11, 11–9, 8–11, 3–11
Nadezhda Bogdanova	1–3	Britt Eerland	7–11, 6–11, 11–9, 9–11

27 June 2019	Poland	3 – 0	Russia

Natalia Bajor / Natalia Partyka	3–1	Olga Vorobeva / Yana Noskova	11–6, 4–11, 11–7, 11–7
Li Qian	3–0	Polina Mikhaylova	11–5, 11–6, 11–9
Natalia Partyka	3–2	Yana Noskova	6–11, 8–11, 11–7, 15–13, 11–6

27 June 2019	Luxembourg	1 – 3	Ukraine

Danielle Konsbruck / Ni Xialian	0–3	Tetyana Bilenko / Hanna Haponova	10–12, 5–11, 8–11
Sarah De Nutte	0–3	Margaryta Pesotska	10–12, 7–11, 7–11
Ni Xialian	3–1	Hanna Haponova	11–3, 10–12, 11–3, 11–5
Sarah De Nutte	0–3	Tetyana Bilenko	6–11, 7–11, 12–14

27 June 2019	Spain	1 – 3	Sweden

Sofia-Xuan Zhang / Galia Dvorak	3–1	Filippa Bergand / Matilda Ekholm	11–9, 11–8, 9–11, 11–9
Maria Xiao Yao	0–3	Linda Bergström	6–11, 5–11, 8–11
Galia Dvorak	0–3	Matilda Ekholm	8–11, 5–11, 6–11
Maria Xiao Yao	1–3	Filippa Bergand	6–11, 16–14, 7–11, 4–11

=== Quarterfinals ===
27 June 2019	Germany	3 – 1	Netherlands

Nina Mittelham / Petrissa Solja	3–1	Kim Vermaas / Britt Eerland	11–9, 11–7, 10–12, 11–5
Han Ying	3–0	Li Jie	13–11, 11–2, 11–7
Petrissa Solja	1–3	Britt Eerland	11–7, 9–11, 5–11, 9–11
Han Ying	3–0	Kim Vermaas	11–7, 11–6, 11–5

27 June 2019	Poland	3 – 1	Austria

Natalia Bajor / Natalia Partyka	3–1	Amelie Solja / Liu Jia	11–5, 7–11, 11–6, 11–5
Li Qian	3–0	Sofia Polcanova	11–5, 13–11, 13–11
Natalia Partyka	1–3	Liu Jia	10–12, 8–11, 11–6, 9–11
Natalia Bajor	3–1	Sofia Polcanova	14–12, 7–11, 12–10, 11–7

27 June 2019	Hungary	3 – 0	Ukraine

Szandra Pergel / Dóra Madarász	3–1	Tetyana Bilenko / Hanna Haponova	5–11, 11–2, 11–4, 11–5
Georgina Póta	3–2	Margaryta Pesotska	6–11, 11–9, 12–10, 9–11, 11–9
Dóra Madarász	3–0	Hanna Haponova	11–1, 11–6, 11–10

27 June 2019	Sweden	1 – 3	Romania

Filippa Bergand / Matilda Ekholm	0–3	Daniela Dodean / Elizabeta Samara	10–12, 6–11, 11–13
Linda Bergström	0–3	Bernadette Szőcs	7–11, 7–11, 7–11
Matilda Ekholm	3–1	Elizabeta Samara	11–4, 10–12, 13–11, 11–8
Filippa Bergand	1–3	Bernadette Szőcs	6–11, 3–11, 11–7, 4–11

=== Semifinals ===
28 June 2019	Germany	3 – 2	Poland

Nina Mittelham / Shan Xiaona	0–3	Natalia Bajor / Natalia Partyka	8–11, 2–11, 12–14
Han Ying	3–0	Li Qian	11–9, 11–7, 11–3
Shan Xiaona	1–3	Natalia Partyka	8–11, 8–11, 11–5, 4–11
Han Ying	3–0	Natalia Bajor	11–2, 11–6, 11–8
Nina Mittelham	3–2	Li Qian	4–11, 11–5, 11–8, 8–11, 11–9

28 June 2019	Hungary	2 – 3	Romania

Szandra Pergel / Dóra Madarász	3–2	Daniela Dodean / Elizabeta Samara	11–9, 6–11, 11–6, 9–11, 12–10
Georgina Póta	0–3	Bernadette Szőcs	9–11, 7–11, 9–11
Dóra Madarász	3–2	Elizabeta Samara	7–11, 11–6, 9–11, 11–7, 11–8
Szandra Pergel	1–3	Bernadette Szőcs	11–7, 10–12, 9–11, 4–11
Georgina Póta	2–3	Daniela Dodean	6–11, 11–7, 14–12, 6–11, 10–12

=== Bronze medal match ===
29 June 2019	Poland	3 – 2	Hungary

Natalia Bajor / Natalia Partyka	2–3	Szandra Pergel / Dóra Madarász	8–11, 11–5, 3–11, 11–5, 9–11
Li Qian	3–1	Georgina Póta	11–5, 3–11, 11–8, 13–11
Natalia Partyka	3–2	Dóra Madarász	13–11, 4–11, 11–8, 1–11, 11–8
Natalia Bajor	1–3	Georgina Póta	8–11, 11–9, 8–11, 5–11
Li Qian	3–1	Szandra Pergel	11–3, 10–12, 11–1, 11–9

=== Gold medal match ===
29 June 2019	Germany	3 – 0	Romania

Nina Mittelham / Shan Xiaona	3–2	Elizabeta Samara / Daniela Dodean	9–11, 11–4, 11–6, 9–11, 11–6
Han Ying	3–1	Bernadette Szőcs	9–11, 11–5, 11–3, 11–2
Shan Xiaona	3–1	Daniela Dodean	11–9, 11–9, 10–12, 11–7
