= 2017 European Table Tennis Championships =

- Date: 13–17 September 2017
- Location: Luxembourg City, Luxembourg
- Venue: d'Coque
- European Table Tennis Championships

The 2017 European Table Tennis Championships was held in Luxembourg City, Luxembourg from 13–17 September 2017. The venue for the competition was d'Coque. The competition featured team events for men and women, with the winning teams qualifying for the 2018 ITTF Team World Cup.

== Schedule ==
Two team events were contested.

Rounds in Main Draw
Finals

Date	13 September	14 September	15 September	16 September	17 September
Men's team	GS	GS	QF	SF	F
Women's team	GS	GS	QF	SF	F

== Medal summary ==
=== Medal table ===
Rank	Nation	Gold	Silver	Bronze	Total
1	Germany (GER)	1	1	0	2
2	Romania (ROU)	1	0	0	1
3	Portugal (POR)	0	1	0	1
4	France (FRA)	0	0	1	1
4	Netherlands (NED)	0	0	1	1
4	Russia (RUS)	0	0	1	1
4	Slovenia (SLO)	0	0	1	1
Totals (7 entries)		2	2	4	8

=== Medalists ===
Event	Gold	Silver	Bronze
Men's team	Germany; Dimitrij Ovtcharov; Timo Boll; Patrick Franziska; Ruwen Filus; Ricardo Walther	Portugal; Tiago Apolónia; Marcos Freitas; João Monteiro; João Geraldo; Diogo Carvalho	Slovenia; Bojan Tokić; Darko Jorgić; Jan Zibrat; Deni Kozul
Men's team	Germany; Dimitrij Ovtcharov; Timo Boll; Patrick Franziska; Ruwen Filus; Ricardo Walther	Portugal; Tiago Apolónia; Marcos Freitas; João Monteiro; João Geraldo; Diogo Carvalho	France; Simon Gauzy; Emmanuel Lebesson; Tristan Flore; Quentin Robinot; Alexandre Robinot
Women's team	Romania; Elizabeta Samara; Daniela Dodean; Bernadette Szőcs; Adina Diaconu; Irina Ciobanu	Germany; Han Ying; Shan Xiaona; Nina Mittelham; Sabine Winter; Yuan Wan	Netherlands; Li Jie; Britt Eerland; Kim Vermaas; Rianne van Duin
Women's team	Romania; Elizabeta Samara; Daniela Dodean; Bernadette Szőcs; Adina Diaconu; Irina Ciobanu	Germany; Han Ying; Shan Xiaona; Nina Mittelham; Sabine Winter; Yuan Wan	Russia; Polina Mikhailova; Yana Noskova; Olga Vorobeva; Ekaterina Guseva; Mariia Tailakova

== See also ==
- 2017 ITTF World Tour
- 2017 ITTF World Tour Grand Finals
