= Shao Jieni =

Portuguese table tennis player

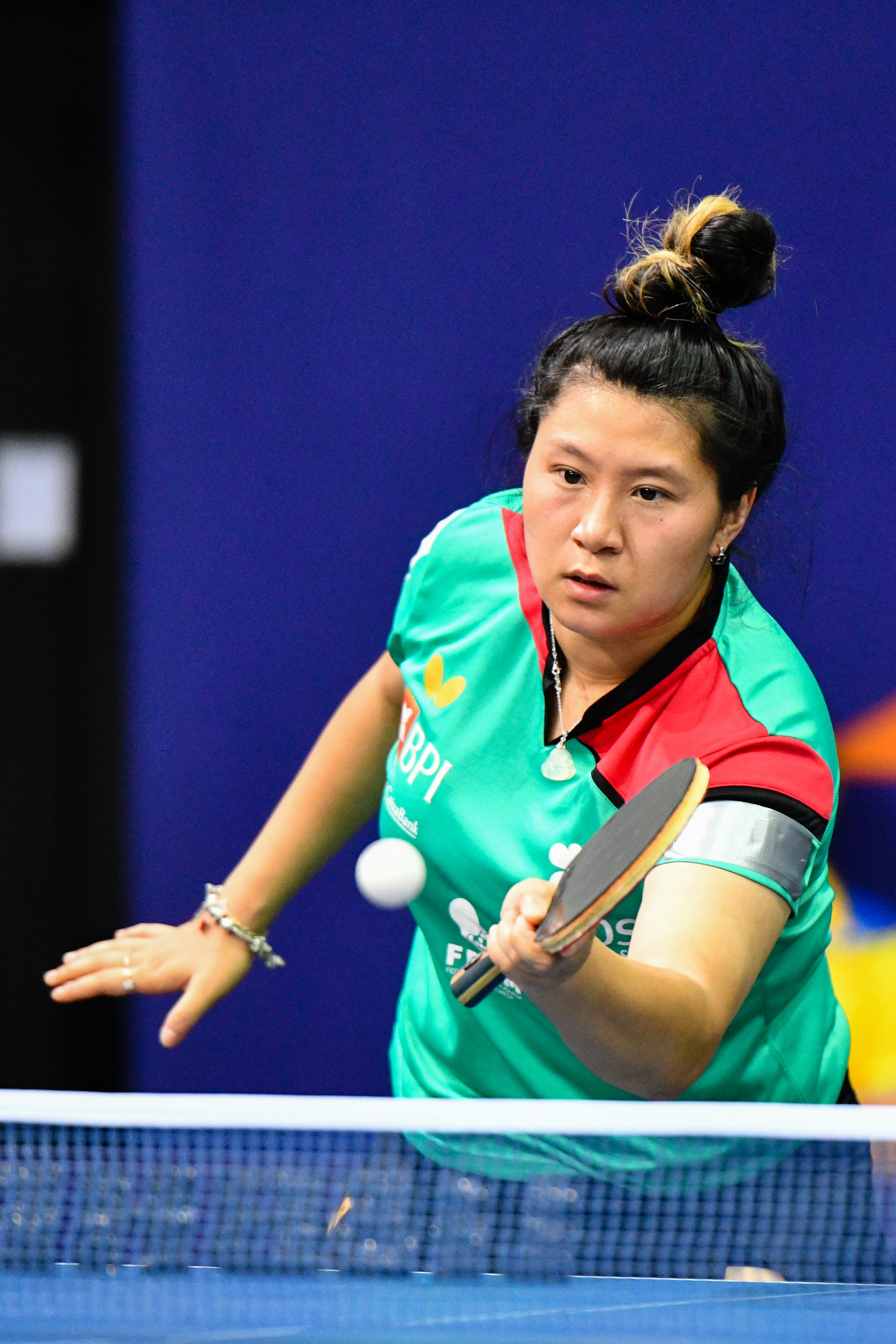

Personal information
- Nationality: Chinese (before 2015); Portuguese (after 2015)
- Born: 24 January 1994 (age 32) Anshan, Liaoning, China
- Height: 169 cm (5 ft 7 in)
- Weight: 70 kg (154 lb)

Sport
- Sport: Table tennis
- Playing style: Left-handed shakehand grip
- Highest ranking: 43 (23 May 2023)
- Current ranking: 71 (28 September 2026)
Medal record
Women's table tennis
Representing Portugal
European Games
Bronze medal – third place	2023 Kraków–Małopolska	Team
European Championships
Silver medal – second place	2019 Nantes	Teams
Bronze medal – third place	2021 Cluj-Napoca	Team
Bronze medal – third place	2023 Malmö	Team
Bronze medal – third place	2025 Zadar	Team
Europe Top-16
Bronze medal – third place	2023 Montreux	Singles
Mediterranean Games
Silver medal – second place	2022 Oran	Singles
Bronze medal – third place	2022 Oran	Team

Shao Jieni (Chinese: 邵杰妮; pinyin: Shào Jiénī, born 24 January 1994) is a Chinese-born Portuguese table tennis player.

Originally from Anshan, Shao Jieni began her professional career in Beijing. In 2010, at the age of sixteen and without speaking any English or Portuguese, she moved to Gondomar, Portugal to play for the Ala de Nun'Álvares de Gondomar club. She registered with the Portugal Table Tennis Federation in April 2013 and became a Portuguese national in August 2015.

She competed at the 2016 Summer Olympics in the women's singles event, in which she was eliminated in the second round by Lily Zhang.

== Achievements ==
=== ITTF Tours ===
Women's singles

Year	Tournament	Level	Final opponent	Score	Rank
2015	Nigeria Open	Challenge	Dina Meshref	4–3	1st place, gold medalist(s)
2016	Nigeria Open	Challenge	Szandra Pergel	4–1	1st place, gold medalist(s)
2019	Indonesia Open	Challenge	Suthasini Sawettabut	4–3	1st place, gold medalist(s)

Women's doubles

Year	Tournament	Level	Partner	Final opponents	Score	Rank
2015	Nigeria Open	Challenge	Dina Meshref	Cecilia Akpan; Offiong Edem	3–1	1st place, gold medalist(s)
2019	Indonesia Open	Challenge	Luo Xue	Suthasini Sawettabut; Orawan Paranang	3–2	1st place, gold medalist(s)
