= Shan Xiaona =

German table tennis player (born 1983)

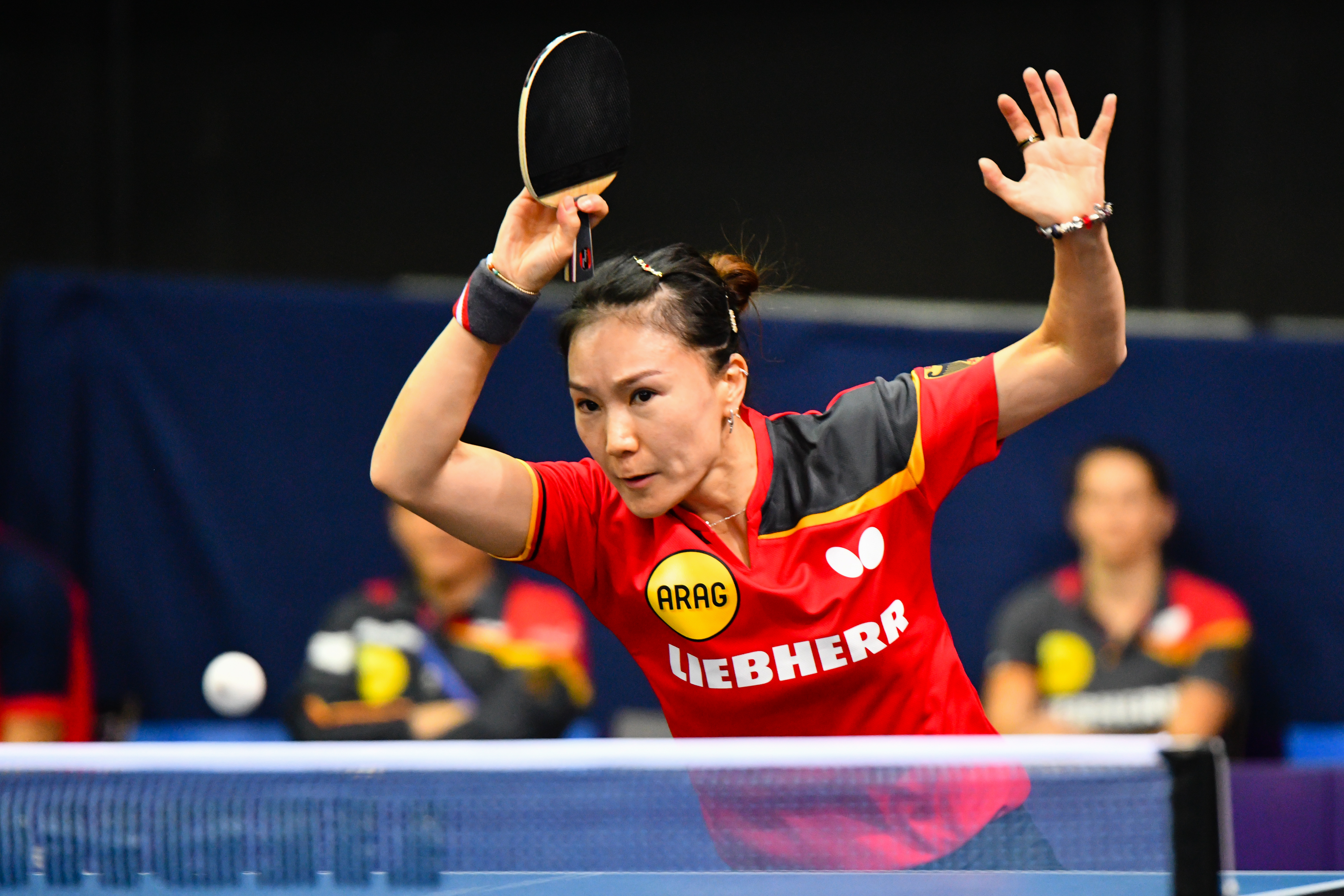

Personal information
- Nationality: German
- Born: 18 January 1983 (age 43) Anshan, Liaoning, China
- Height: 1.65 m (5 ft 5 in)
- Weight: 54 kg (119 lb)

Sport
- Sport: Table tennis
- Highest ranking: 12 (March 2017)
- Current ranking: 63 (28 September 2026)
Medal record
Women's table tennis
Representing Germany
Olympic Games
| Silver medal – second place | 2016 Rio de Janeiro | Team |
World Championships
| Bronze medal – third place | 2022 Chengdu | Team |
European Games
| Gold medal – first place | 2015 Baku | Team |
| Gold medal – first place | 2019 Minsk | Team |
| Silver medal – second place | 2023 Kraków–Małopolska | Team |
European Championships
| Gold medal – first place | 2013 Schwechat | Team |
| Gold medal – first place | 2014 Lisbon | Team |
| Gold medal – first place | 2015 Yekaterinburg | Team |
| Gold medal – first place | 2020 Warsaw | Doubles |
| Gold medal – first place | 2023 Malmö | Team |
| Silver medal – second place | 2013 Schwechat | Singles |
| Silver medal – second place | 2013 Schwechat | Doubles |
| Silver medal – second place | 2016 Budapest | Doubles |
| Silver medal – second place | 2017 Luxembourg City | Team |
| Silver medal – second place | 2020 Warsaw | Singles |
| Bronze medal – third place | 2022 Munich | Singles |
Europe Top-16
| Bronze medal – third place | 2025 Montreux | Singles |

Shan Xiaona (Chinese: 单晓娜; born 18 January 1983 in Anshan, Liaoning, China) is a Chinese-born naturalised German table tennis player. She briefly played for team Singapore on the ITTF Pro Tour between 2006-2007 before winning multiple medals for Germany at the European Championships and European Games. Most notably, she was part of the silver medal winning outfit in the women's team table tennis competition at the 2016 Summer Olympics.

== Singles titles ==
| Year | Tournament | Final opponent | Score | Ref |
|---|---|---|---|---|
| 2014 | ITTF World Tour, German Open | (South Korea) Suh Hyo-won | 4–0 | |
| 2022 | WTT Feeder Düsseldorf III | (Poland) Natalia Bajor | 4–1 | |
