= Nina Mittelham =

German table tennis player (born 1996)

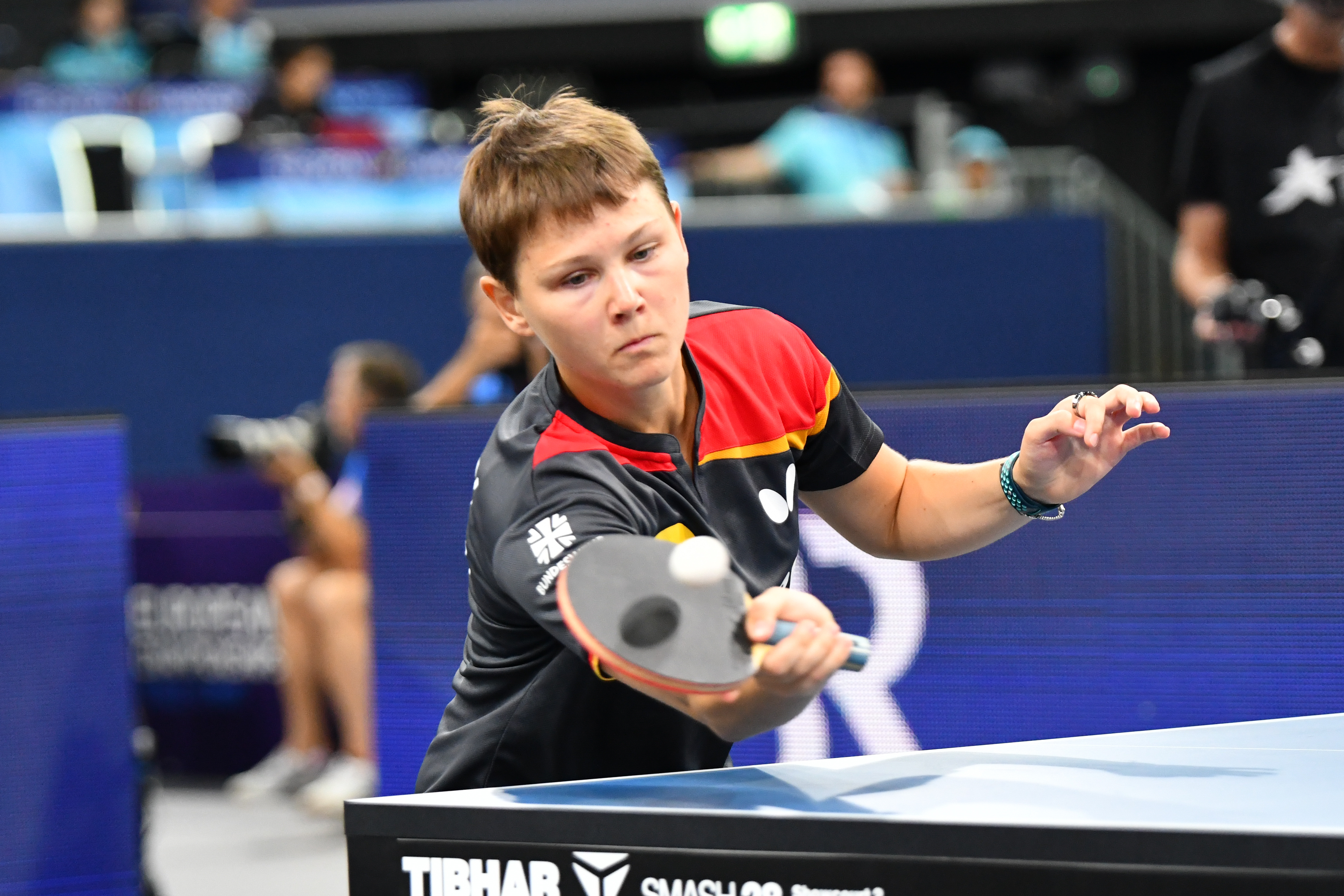

Personal information
- Born: 23 November 1996 (age 29) Willich, Germany
- Height: 164 cm (5 ft 5 in)

Sport
- Sport: Table tennis
- Playing style: Right-handed, shakehand grip
- Highest ranking: 12 (21 June 2022)
- Current ranking: 29 (28 September 2026)
Medal record
Women's table tennis
Representing Germany
World Championships
Bronze medal – third place	2022 Chengdu	Team
Bronze medal – third place	2026 London	Team
World Cup
Bronze medal – third place	2025 Chengdu	Mixed team
European Games
Gold medal – first place	2019 Minsk	Team
Gold medal – first place	2023 Kraków–Małopolska	Mixed doubles
Silver medal – second place	2023 Kraków–Małopolska	Team
European Championships
Gold medal – first place	2018 Alicante	Doubles
Gold medal – first place	2020 Warsaw	Mixed doubles
Gold medal – first place	2021 Cluj-Napoca	Team
Gold medal – first place	2023 Malmö	Team
Gold medal – first place	2025 Zadar	Team
Gold medal – first place	2026 Ljubljana	Mixed doubles
Silver medal – second place	2017 Luxembourg City	Team
Silver medal – second place	2020 Warsaw	Doubles
Silver medal – second place	2022 Munich	Singles
Bronze medal – third place	2024 Linz	Singles
Bronze medal – third place	2026 Ljubljana	Doubles
Bronze medal – third place	2026 Ljubljana	Singles

Nina Mittelham (born 23 November 1996) is a German table tennis player. She clinched the women's singles titles at the 2021 Europe Top 16 Cup. In 2022, she won singles title at the WTT Lima Contender.
