= Natalia Bajor =

Polish table tennis player (born 1997)

Personal information
- Full name: Natalia Olimpia Bajor
- Nationality: Polish
- Born: 7 March 1997 (age 29)

Sport
- Sport: Table tennis
- Highest ranking: 36 (1 August 2024)
- Current ranking: 44 (28 September 2026)
Medal record
Women's table tennis
Representing Poland
European Games
Bronze medal – third place	2019 Minsk	Team
European Championships
Gold medal – first place	2026 Ljubljana	Doubles
Bronze medal – third place	2019 Nantes	Team
Bronze medal – third place	2024 Linz	Doubles

Natalia Olimpia Bajor (born 7 March 1997) is a Polish table tennis player. She competed in the women's team event at the 2020 Summer Olympics.
