= Dana Čechová =

Czech table tennis player

Dana Čechová (born 3 September 1983 as Dana Hadačová) is a Czech table tennis player.

She competed at the 2008 Summer Olympics, reaching the second round of the singles competition. In 2012, she lost in the first round to Miao Miao.

She was born in Hodonín, Czech Republic, and resides there.
