= Karoline Mischek =

Austrian table tennis player

Personal information
- Nationality: Austrian
- Born: 22 May 1998 (age 27)

Sport
- Sport: Table tennis

Karoline Mischek (born 22 May 1998) is an Austrian table tennis player. Her highest career ITTF ranking was 108.
