= Stéphanie Loeuillette =

French table tennis player

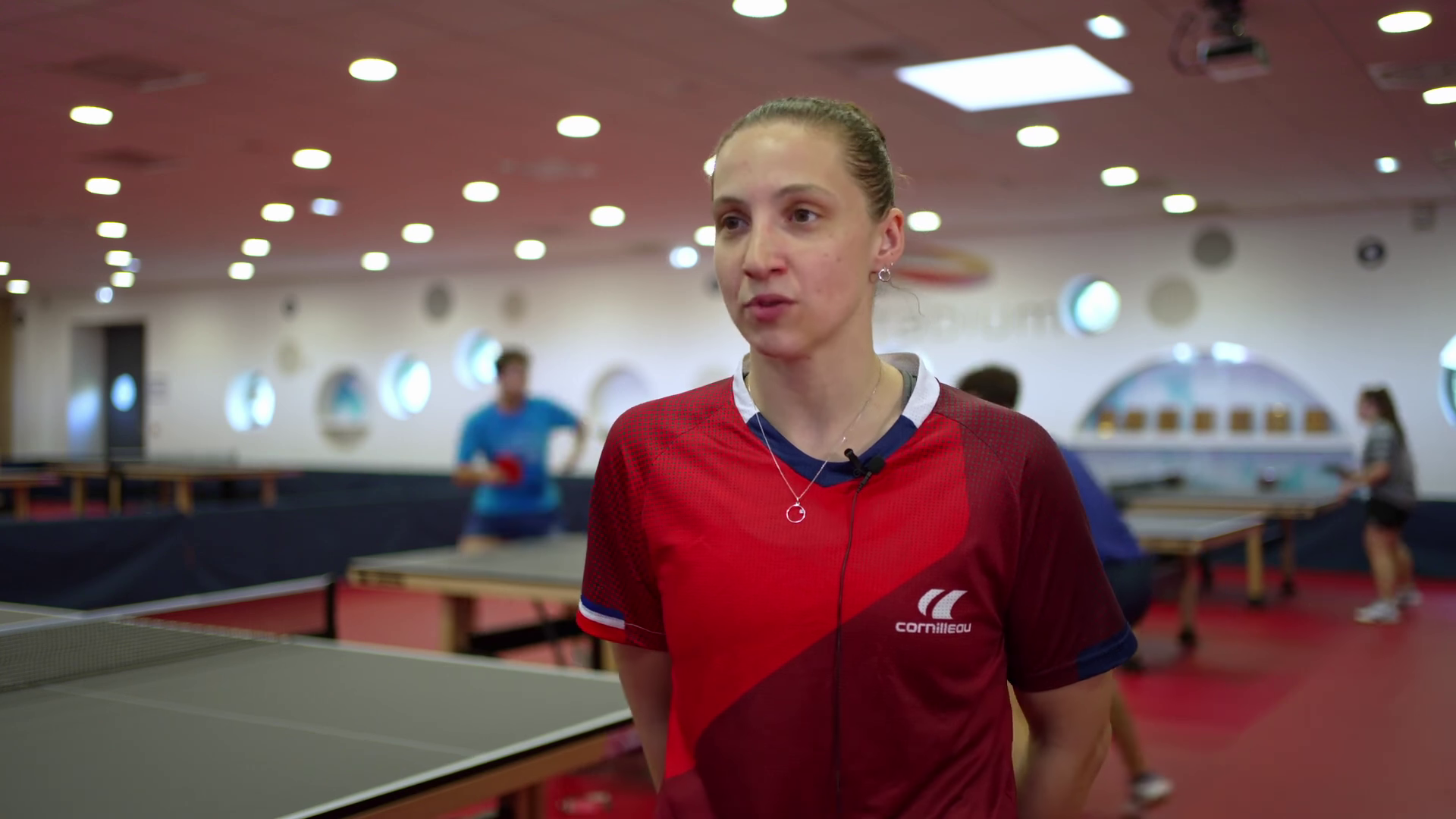

Personal information
- Nationality: French
- Born: 27 July 1992 (age 34) Wattrelos, France

Sport
- Sport: Table tennis
Medal record
Women's table tennis
Representing France
European Championships
Bronze medal – third place	2020 Warsaw	Doubles
Mediterranean Games
Bronze medal – third place	2018 Tarragona	Team

Stéphanie Loeuillette (born 27 July 1992) is a French table tennis player. She competed in the women's team event at the 2020 Summer Olympics.
