= Yana Noskova =

Russian table tennis player

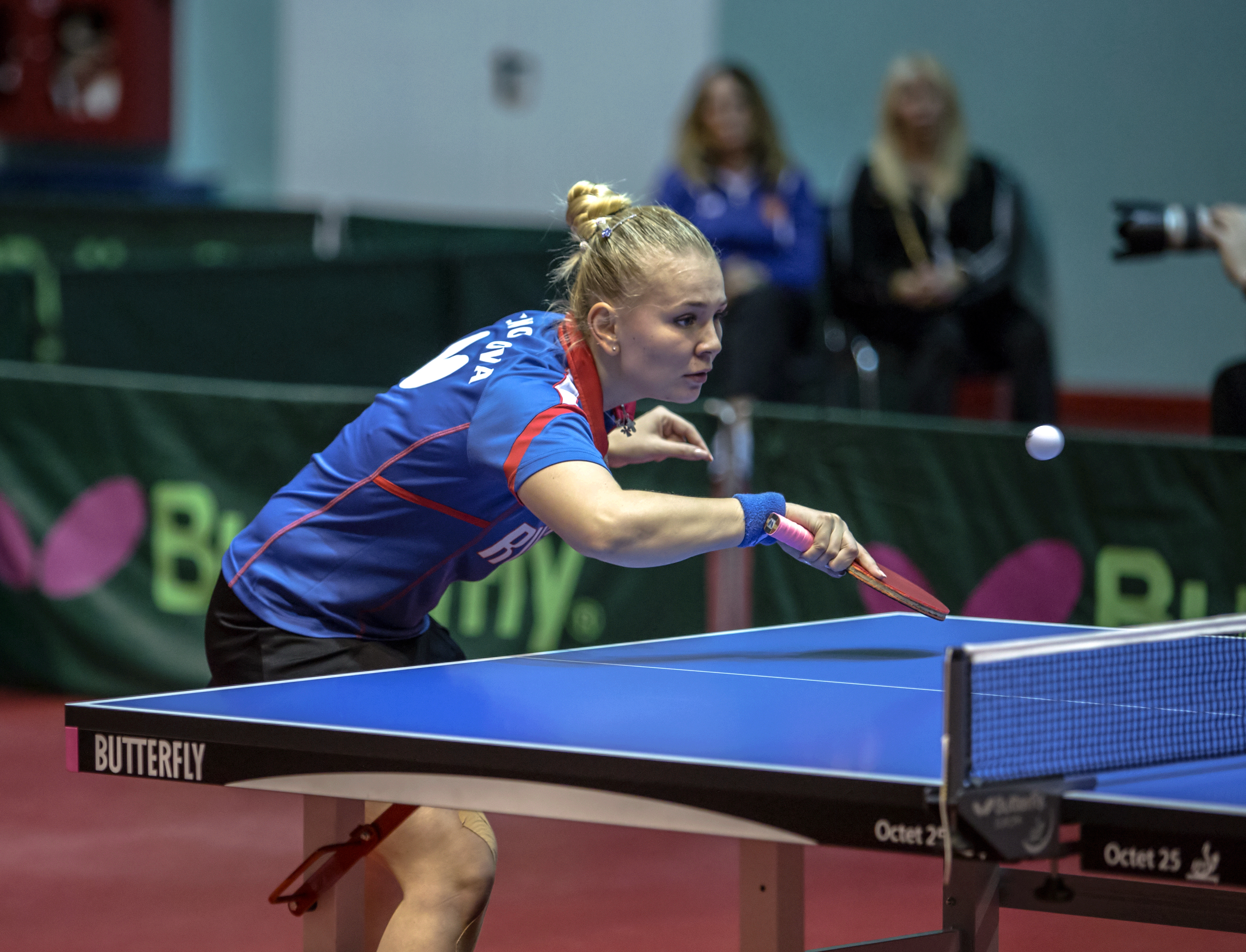

Personal information
- Nationality: (Russia) Russian
- Born: February 2, 1994 (age 32) Moscow, Russia
- Height: 1.62 m (5 ft 4 in)
- Weight: 59 kg (130 lb)

Sport
- Sport: Table tennis
- Playing style: Right-handed, shakehand grip
- Highest ranking: 66 (December 2015)
Medal record
Women's table tennis
Representing Russia
European Championships
Bronze medal – third place	2013 Schwechat	Team
Bronze medal – third place	2015 Yekaterinburg	Team
Bronze medal – third place	2017 Luxembourg City	Team

Yana Sergeyevna Noskova (Russian: Яна Сергеевна Носкова; born 2 February 1994) is a Russian table tennis player. She competed for Russia at the 2012 Summer Olympics.
