= Dóra Madarász =

Hungarian table tennis player

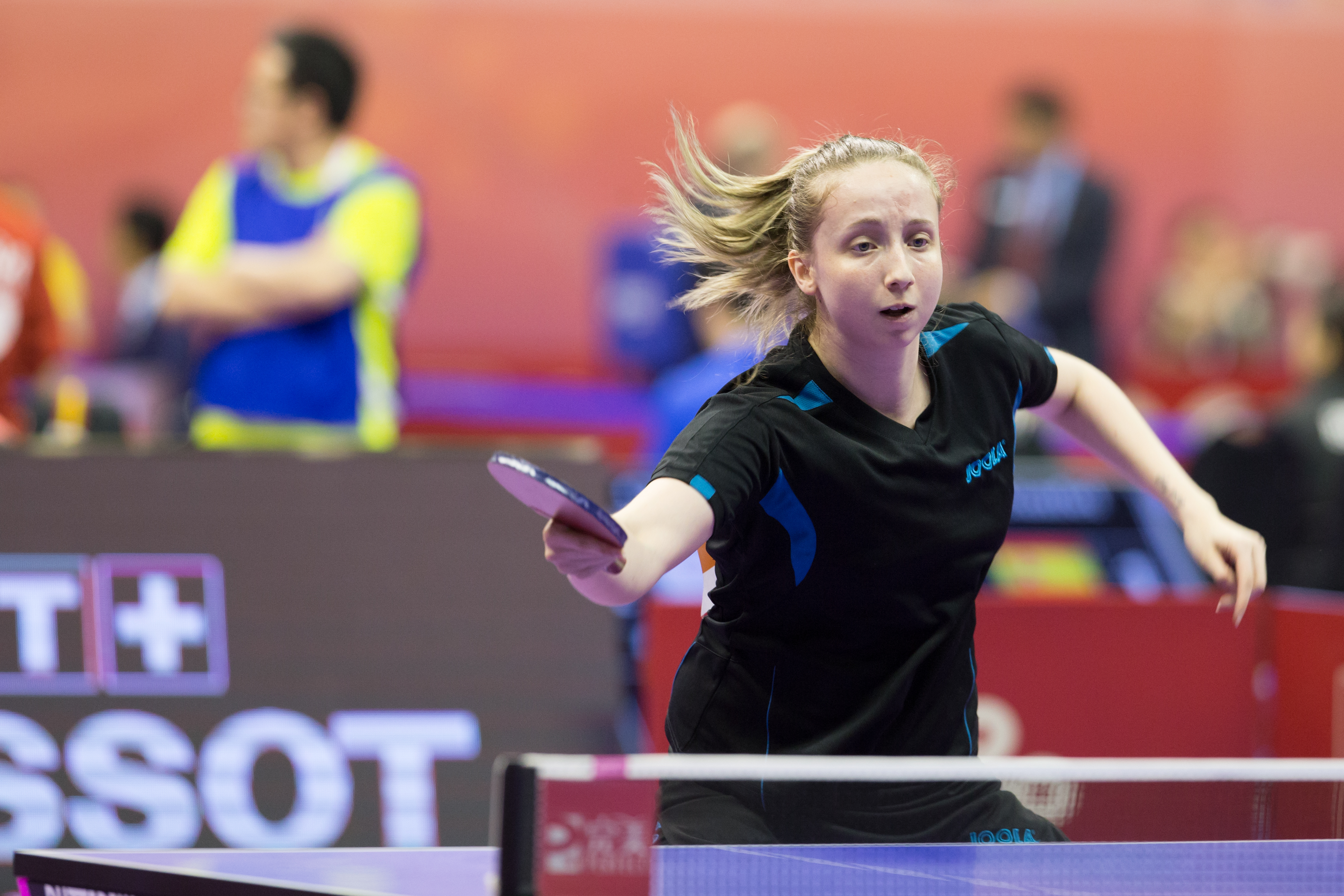
- Madarász in 2016

Personal information
- Full name: Dóra Csilla Madarász
- Born: 3 September 1993 (age 32) Kecskemét, Hungary

Sport
- Sport: Table tennis
- Highest ranking: 57 (August 2019)
- Current ranking: 85 (27 June 2023)
Medal record
Women's table tennis
Representing Hungary
European Games
Silver medal – second place	2023 Kraków–Małopolska	Mixed doubles
European Championships
Bronze medal – third place	2011 Gdańsk–Sopot	Team
Bronze medal – third place	2012 Herning	Doubles
Bronze medal – third place	2016 Budapest	Doubles
Bronze medal – third place	2019 Nantes	Team

Dóra Csilla Madarász (born 3 September 1993) is a Hungarian table tennis player. She competed in the 2020 Summer Olympics.
