= Liu Jia =

Austrian table tennis player

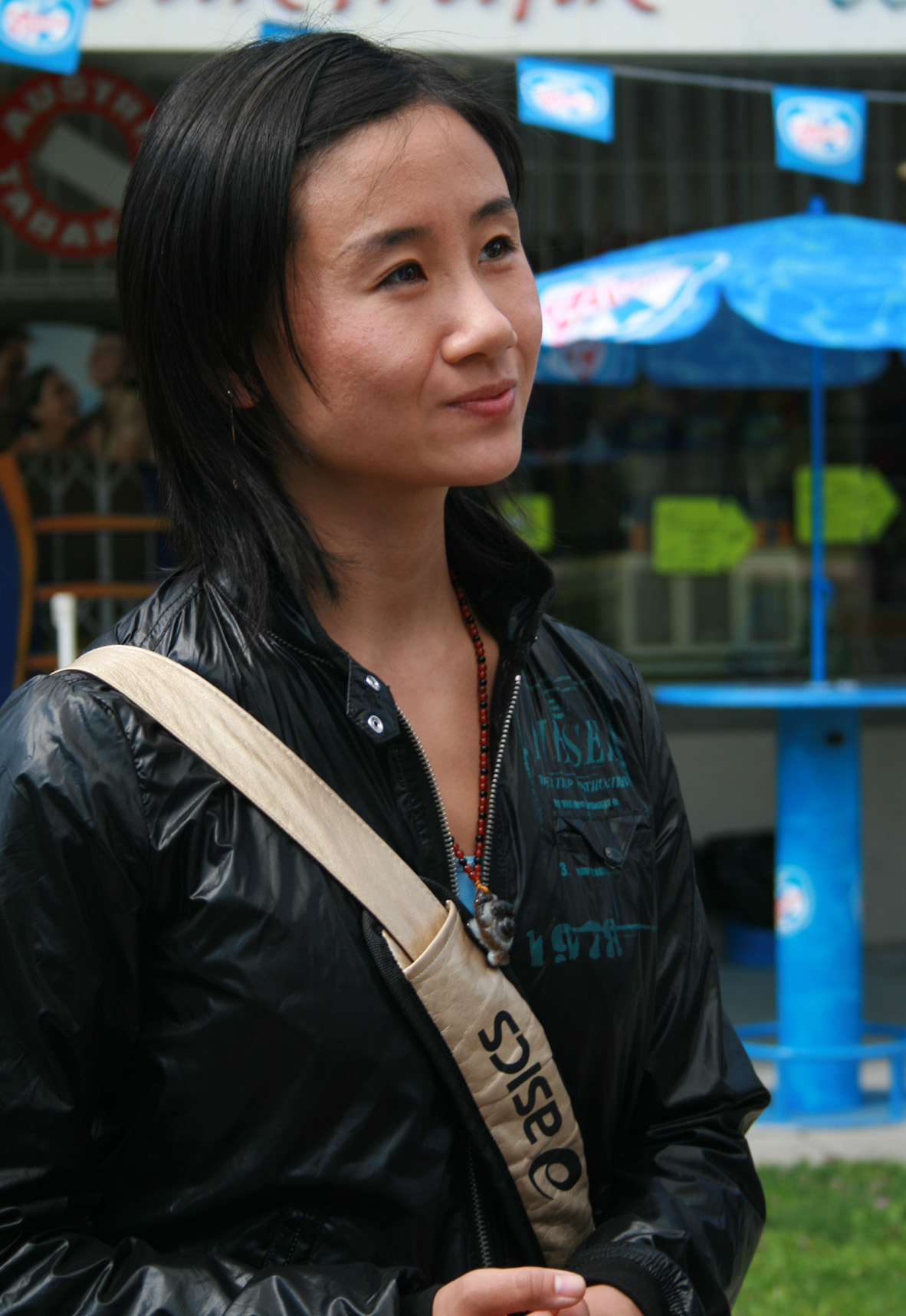
- Liu Jia in Vienna, Austria in 2008

Personal information
- Full name: Liu Jia
- Nickname: Susi
- Nationality: Austria
- Born: 16 February 1982 (age 44) Beijing, China
- Height: 1.60 m (5 ft 3 in)
- Weight: 46 kg (101 lb; 7.2 st)

Sport
- Sport: Table tennis
- Club: Linz AG Froschberg
- Playing style: Shakehand
- Equipment: Tibhar
- Highest ranking: 9 (2005, 2014)
- Current ranking: 25 (August 2016)
Medal record
Women's table tennis
Representing Austria
European Table Tennis Championships
Gold medal – first place	2005 Aarhus	Singles
Silver medal – second place	2008 St Petersburg	Singles
Silver medal – second place	2010 Ostrava	Singles
Bronze medal – third place	2002 Zagreb	Mixed
Bronze medal – third place	2005 Aarhus	Mixed
Bronze medal – third place	2012 Herning	Singles
EURO-Top 12
Gold medal – first place	2005 Rennes	Singles

Liu Jia (Chinese: 劉佳; born 16 February 1982 in Beijing, China) is a Chinese-born Austrian left-handed table tennis player.

== Early life ==
From 1992 to 1995, Liu attended Shichahai Sporting High School in Beijing. Afterward she became a member of professional club Shian Nuntan, where she played with Zhang Yining. Despite Liu's successes as a Cadet and Junior, competition within the Chinese team was strong and prospects for a future international career were dim. Instead of following a call to Japan, Liu travelled to Austria when the opportunity arose to play for Austrian team Linz AG Froschberg.

She arrived in March 1997 without speaking either German or English, but quickly learned German within the year that she settled in Austria. She won the first International Austrian Youth Championships soon after her arrival. On 16 February 1998, her 16th birthday, she became an Austrian citizen and a member of the Austrian table tennis squad. Her husband, David Arvidsson is an international Danish table tennis player.

== Career ==
Liu continued her success on youth level by taking Gold in the Singles, Doubles and Mixed competition at the 1998 European Youth Championships in Norcia. In 1999, she again claimed the singles and mixed titles in Frydek-Mistek.

She competed at the 2000 Sydney Olympics, the 2004 Olympics in Athens and the 2008 Beijing Olympics, reaching the third round of the singles competition in each of them. She also competed in the team competition in Beijing. In May 2011, she qualified for her fourth Olympic attendance in the 2012 London Olympics where she was knocked out in the third round.

She competed at the 2016 Summer Olympics in Rio de Janeiro. She was defeated in the fourth round by Feng Tianwei of Singapore. She also competed in the women's team event, but the Austrian team was defeated by Japan in the quarterfinals. Liu was the flag bearer for Austria during the Parade of Nations.

In the 2020 Summer Olympics, Liu defeated 12-year-old Syrian Hend Zaza in the preliminary round of the Women's Singles, with a score of 11:4, 11:9, 11:3, 11:5. Zaza was the youngest competitor in the games, the youngest table tennis player to compete in any Olympics, and the first Syrian table tennis player to qualify for the Olympics. In the first round Liu defeated Ukrainian Hanna Haponova.

== Results ==
=== European Championships ===
- European Champion Women's Singles: 2005 Aarhus
- Silver medal Women's Singles: 2008 St Petersburg
- Silver medal Women's Singles: 2010 Ostrava
- Bronze medal Mixed: 2005 Aarhus (with Werner Schlager)
- Bronze medal Mixed: 2002 Zagreb (with Werner Schlager)

=== World Championships ===
- Quarterfinals Women's Singles and Doubles: 2001 Osaka
- 6th place Women's Team: 2008 Guangzhou

=== Pro Tour ===
- Winner 2012 Czech Open: Women's Singles
- Winner 2008 German Open: Women's Singles
- Winner 2004 Brazil Open: Women's Singles
- Winner 2004 US Open: Women's Doubles
- Runner-up 2006 Polish Open: Women's Singles and Doubles
- Runner-up 2004 Egypt Open: Women's Singles
- Runner-up 2004 Croatia Open: Women's Singles
- Runner-up 2003 Korea Open: Women's Singles
- Runner-up 2001 Brazil Open: Women's Singles
- Runner-up 2001 Croatia Open: Women's Doubles
- Runner-up 1999 Czech Open: Women's Doubles
- Runner-up 1999 Australian Open: Women's Doubles
- Runner-up 1999 Qatar Open: Women's Doubles

Olympic Games
Preceded by Markus Rogan	Flagbearer for Austria; Rio de Janeiro 2016	Succeeded by Tanja Frank & Thomas Zajac
