= Nadezhda Bogdanova =

Belarusian table tennis player (born 2000)

Personal information
- Nationality: Belarusian
- Born: 22 June 2000 (age 24)

Sport
- Sport: Table tennis

Nadezhda Bogdanova (born 22 June 2000) is a Belarusian table tennis player. Her highest career ITTF ranking was 91.
