= Britt Eerland =

Dutch table tennis player

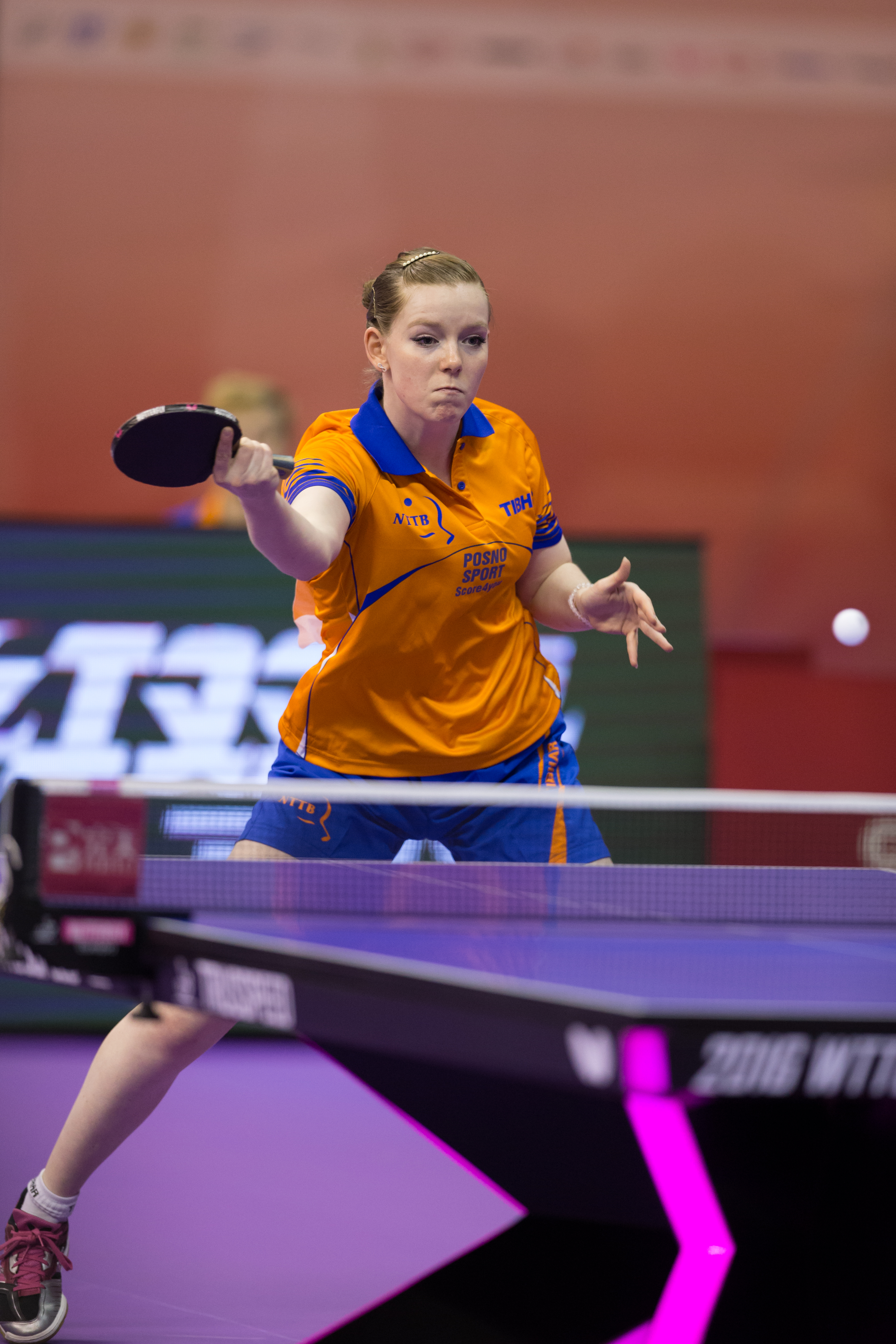

Personal information
- Born: February 22, 1994 (age 32)

Sport
- Sport: Table tennis
- Highest ranking: 27 (1 December 2020)
- Current ranking: 37 (15 July 2025)
Medal record
Women's table tennis
Representing the Netherlands
European Championships
Bronze medal – third place	2025 Zadar	Team

Britt Eerland (born 22 February 1994) is a Dutch table tennis player.

She competed at the 2016 Summer Olympics as part of the Dutch team in the women's team event and also competed at the 2020 Summer Olympics and 2024 Summer Olympics. She also made a comeback after not playing for two years and participated in the 2024 Singapore smash event.
