= Szandra Pergel =

Hungarian table tennis player

Personal information
- Nationality: Hungary
- Born: 24 December 1988 (age 36); Budapest, Hungary

Sport
- Sport: Table tennis

Szandra Pergel (born 24 December 1988) is a Hungarian table tennis player. She competed in the 2020 Summer Olympics.

On club level she competes for Panathinaikos.
