= 2009 World Table Tennis Championships – Mixed doubles =

Mixed doubles at the 2009 World Table Tennis Championships
- Venue: Yokohama Arena
- Location: Yokohama, Japan
- Final score: 11–6, 4–11, 11–7, 9–11, 13–11, 11–8

Medalists
gold medal	Li Ping; Cao Zhen	China
silver medal	Zhang Jike; Mu Zi	China
bronze medal	Hao Shuai; Chang Chenchen	China
bronze medal	Zhang Chao; Yao Yan	China

The 2009 World Table Tennis Championships mixed doubles was the 50th edition of the mixed doubles championship.

Li Ping and Cao Zhen defeated Zhang Jike and Mu Zi in the final.

== Seeds ==
1. (Hong Kong) Ko Lai Chak / (Hong Kong) Tie Ya Na (quarterfinals)
2. (South Korea) Joo Sae-hyuk / (South Korea) Park Mi-young (second round)
3. (Singapore) Gao Ning / (Singapore) Feng Tianwei (fourth round)
4. (South Korea) Oh Sang-eun / (South Korea) Dang Ye-seo (fourth round)
5. (Hong Kong) Tang Peng / (Hong Kong) Jiang Huajun (fourth round)
6. (China) Hao Shuai / (China) Chang Chenchen (semifinals)
7. (China) Xu Xin / (China) Fan Ying (quarterfinals)
8. (Hong Kong) Leung Chu Yan / (Hong Kong) Lin Ling (fourth round)
9. (Singapore) Yang Zi / (Singapore) Wang Yuegu (fourth round)
10. (Japan) Jun Mizutani / (Japan) Sayaka Hirano (fourth round)
11. (Hong Kong) Cheung Yuk / (Hong Kong) Lau Sui Fei (third round)
12. (Chinese Taipei) Chuang Chih-yuan / (Chinese Taipei) Huang Yi-hua (second round)
13. (Germany) Christian Süß / (Germany) Elke Schall (quarterfinals)
14. (Hong Kong) Jiang Tianyi / (Hong Kong) Zhang Rui (third round)
15. (China) Zhang Chao / (China) Yao Yan (semifinals)
16. (Romania) Adrian Crișan / (Romania) Daniela Dodean (second round)
17. (China) Xu Hui / (China) Peng Luyang (third round)
18. (South Korea) Kim Jung-hoon / (South Korea) Lee Eun-hee (second round)
19. (Germany) Patrick Baum / (Germany) Wu Jiaduo (second round)
20. (China) Li Ping / (China) Cao Zhen (champions)
21. (Austria) Robert Gardos / (Austria) Li Qiangbing (third round)
22. (China) Qiu Yike / (China) Li Xiaodan (third round)
23. (Hungary) János Jakab / (Hungary) Krisztina Tóth (third round)
24. (Italy) Yang Min / (Italy) Wenling Tan Monfardini (second round)
25. (Japan) Kenta Matsudaira / (Japan) Ai Fukuhara (second round)
26. (Germany) Bastian Steger / (Germany) Zhenqi Barthel (third round)
27. (China) Zhang Jike / (China) Mu Zi (final)
28. (France) Christophe Legoût / (France) Carole Grundisch (fourth round)
29. (Romania) Andrei Filimon / (Romania) Elizabeta Samara (third round)
30. (Czech Republic) Petr Korbel / (Czech Republic) Renáta Štrbíková (third round)
31. (Italy) Mihai Bobocica / (Italy) Nikoleta Stefanova (second round)
32. (Poland) Wang Zengyi / (Poland) Natalia Partyka (second round)

== Final Rounds ==
Quarterfinals
1	(Hong Kong) Ko Lai Chak (Hong Kong) Tie Yana	6	9	10	11	5
6	(China) Hao Shuai (China) Chang Chenchen	11	11	11	8	11
27	(China) Zhang Jike (China) Mu Zi	11	14	11	11
13	(Germany) Christian Süß (Germany) Elke Schall	7	12	6	8
20	(China) Li Ping (China) Cao Zhen	11	11	11	11
7	(China) Xu Xin (China) Fan Ying	7	6	8	7
15	(China) Zhang Chao (China) Yao Yan	6	13	6	11	11	9	11
6	(Slovakia) Lubomir Pistej (Slovakia) Eva Odorova	11	11	11	5	7	11	7

Semifinals
6	(China) Hao Shuai (China) Chang Chenchen	9	8	12	6	7
27	(China) Zhang Jike (China) Mu Zi	11	11	10	11	11
20	(China) Li Ping (China) Cao Zhen	12	11	11	4	6	11
15	(China) Zhang Chao (China) Yao Yan	10	9	8	11	11	6

Finals
27	(China) Zhang Jike (China) Mu Zi	6	11	7	11	11	8
20	(China) Li Ping (China) Cao Zhen	11	4	11	9	13	11

== Early Rounds ==
=== Section 1 ===
First Round
1	(Hong Kong) Ko Lai Chak (Hong Kong) Tie Yana	7	11	11	11	11
Q	(Mexico) Marcos Madrid (Mexico) Mercedes Madrid	11	3	7	4	7
Q	(Colombia) Juan Restrepo (Colombia) Johana Araque	5	10	9	9
9	(Poland) Jakub Kosowski (Poland) Xu Jie	11	12	11	11
5	(Serbia) Marko Jevtović (Serbia) Anamaria Erdelji	11	11	11	5	11
12	(Thailand) Phu. Sanguansin (Thailand) Anisara Muangsuk	7	9	8	11	7
4	(United States) Yu Shao (United States) Jasna Reed	6	2	6	11	3
22	(China) Qiu Yike (China) Li Xiaodan	11	11	11	3	11
24	(Italy) Min Yang (Italy) W. T. Monfardini	11	11	11	9	4	8	12
11	(Belarus) Aleksandr Kuchuk (Belarus) A. Privalova	5	5	5	11	11	11	10
Q	(Venezuela) Jonathan Pino (Venezuela) Ruaida Ezzeddine	7	7	3	6
14	(South Korea) Lee Jin Kwon (South Korea) Park Young Sook	11	11	11	11
7	(Japan) Jin Ueda (Japan) Haruna Fukuoka	w/o
10	(Israel) Isaak Abramov (Israel) Dana Saporta
Q	(Russia) Aleksandr Shibayev (Russia) Yana Noskova	5	1	2	5
12	(Chinese Taipei) Chuang C.-Y. (Chinese Taipei) Huang Yi-Hua	11	11	11	11

Second Round
1	(Hong Kong) Ko Lai Chak (Hong Kong) Tie Yana	11	11	11	11
(Poland) Jakub Kosowski (Poland) Xu Jie	5	3	2	7
(Serbia) Marko Jevtović (Serbia) Anamaria Erdelji	6	10	6	6
22	(China) Qiu Yike (China) Li Xiaodan	11	12	11	11
24	(Italy) Min Yang (Italy) W. Tan Monfardini	3	14	8	3	7
(South Korea) Lee Jin Kwon (South Korea) Park Young Sook	11	12	11	11	11
(Japan) Jin Ueda (Japan) Haruna Fukuoka	11	7	11	12	11
12	(Chinese Taipei) Chuang C.-Y. (Chinese Taipei) Huang Yi-Hua	8	11	5	10	4

Third Round
1	(Hong Kong) Ko Lai Chak (Hong Kong) Tie Yana	5	11	11	14	9	11
22	(China) Qiu Yike (China) Li Xiaodan	11	9	5	12	11	6
(South Korea) Lee Jin Kwon (South Korea) Park Young Sook	11	7	11	11	11
(Japan) Jin Ueda (Japan) Haruna Fukuoka	9	11	9	7	8

Fourth Round
1	(Hong Kong) Ko Lai Chak (Hong Kong) Tie Yana	5	11	11	11	3	7	11
(South Korea) Lee Jin Kwon (South Korea) Park Y. S.	11	7	7	8	11	11	9

=== Section 2 ===
First Round
9	(Singapore) Yang Zi (Singapore) Wang Yuegu	9	11	9	7	11	12	11
16	(Austria) B. Presslmayer (Austria) Martina Petzner	11	7	11	11	5	10	5
8	(Wales) Adam Robertson (Wales) Naomi Owen	5	10	8	3
9	(Spain) Alfredo Carneros (Spain) Zhu Fang	11	12	11	11
5	(Japan) Kenji Matsudaira (Japan) Misako Wakamiya	11	11	9	11	6	11
Q	(Estonia) Vallot Vainula (Estonia) Karin Lindmae	2	2	11	7	11	1
Q	(Colombia) A. Echavarria (Colombia) Aura O. Lopez	10	3	7	7
23	(Hungary) Janos Jakab (Hungary) Krisztina Toth	12	11	11	11
25	(Japan) Kenta Matsudaira (Japan) Ai Fukuhara	11	11	11	11
Q	(Latvia) Matiss Burgis (Latvia) Baiba Bogdasarova	6	5	2	2
Q	(Denmark) C. Kongsgaard (Denmark) Pernille Agerholm	4	12	5	11	11	8
14	(Chinese Taipei) Chiang H.-C. (Chinese Taipei) Cheng I-Ching	11	10	11	13	7	11
7	(South Korea) Seo Hyun Deok (South Korea) Seok Ha Jung	12	11	11	10	10	11
Q	(Slovenia) Uros Slatinsek (Slovenia) Jana Tomazini	10	9	9	12	12	8
Q	(Malaysia) Kho Mao Sheng (Malaysia) Chiu Soo Jin	1	6	5	3
6	(China) Hao Shuai (China) Chang Chenchen	11	11	11	11

Second Round
9	(Singapore) Yang Zi (Singapore) Wang Yuegu	11	13	11	8	11
(Spain) Alfredo Carneros (Spain) Zhu Fang	6	11	4	11	6
(Japan) Kenji Matsudaira (Japan) Misako Wakamiya	11	9	6	11	8
23	(Hungary) Janos Jakab (Hungary) Krisztina Toth	7	11	11	13	11
25	(Japan) Kenta Matsudaira (Japan) Ai Fukuhara	11	14	5	8	8	11	9
(Chinese Taipei) Chiang H.-C. (Chinese Taipei) Cheng I-Ching	8	12	11	11	11	7	11
(South Korea) Seo Hyun Deok (South Korea) Seok Ha Jung	8	9	6	11	11	4
6	(China) Hao Shuai (China) Chang Chenchen	11	11	11	7	7	11

Third Round
9	(Singapore) Yang Zi (Singapore) Wang Yuegu	11	11	8	8	9	11	11
23	(Hungary) Janos Jakab (Hungary) Krisztina Toth	8	5	11	11	11	2	8
(Chinese Taipei) Chiang H.-C. (Chinese Taipei) Cheng I-Ching	11	10	6	8	15	11	8
6	(China) Hao Shuai (China) Chang Chenchen	3	12	11	11	13	8	11

Fourth Round
9	(Singapore) Yang Zi (Singapore) Wang Yuegu	4	7	7	5
6	(China) Hao Shuai (China) Chang Chenchen	11	11	11	11

=== Section 3 ===
First Round
5	(Hong Kong) Tang Peng (Hong Kong) Jiang Huajun	11	11	12	11
Q	(Colombia) Mauricio Rivera (Colombia) Paula Medina	1	2	10	2
8	(India) Subhajit Saha (India) Poulomi Ghatak	7	9	5	9
9	(Australia) William Henzell (Australia) Miao Miao	11	11	11	11
5	(Singapore) Pang Xue Jie (Singapore) Sun Bei Bei	11	11	11	11
12	(Slovakia) Peter Sereda (Slovakia) Barbora Balazova	8	5	8	8
4	(Canada) P. Peter-Paul (Canada) Zhang Mo	4	7	9	13	8
17	(China) Xu Hui (China) Peng Luyang	11	11	11	11	11
27	(China) Zhang Jike (China) Mu Zi	11	11	11	11
11	(France) Adrien Mattenet (France) Audrey Mattenet	5	4	8	4
Q	(Mexico) G. Munoz Ronquillo (Mexico) Laura Rosales	9	5	9	7
14	(South Korea) Kim Dong-Hyun (South Korea) Yang Ha Eun	11	11	11	11
7	(Turkey) Bora Vang (Turkey) Sirin He	11	11	11	11
Q	(Moldova) Igor Ni (Moldova) Sofia Polcanova	5	2	7	5
2	(Lithuania) Algirdas Skirgaila (Lithuania) Ruta Paskauskiene	5	3	11	5	2
16	(Romania) Adrian Crisan (Romania) Daniela Dodean	11	11	7	11	11

Second Round
5	(Hong Kong) Tang Peng (Hong Kong) Jiang Huajun	4	13	11	11	11
(Australia) William Henzell (Australia) Miao Miao	11	11	3	6	7
(Singapore) Pang Xue Jie (Singapore) Sun Bei Bei	10	9	4	7
17	(China) Xu Hui (China) Peng Luyang	12	11	11	11
27	(China) Zhang Jike (China) Mu Zi	11	11	11	11
(South Korea) Kim Dong-Hyun (South Korea) Yang Ha Eun	5	4	4	8
(Turkey) Bora Vang (Turkey) Sirin He	10	12	10	11	10	11	11
16	(Romania) Adrian Crisan (Romania) Daniela Dodean	12	10	12	6	12	8	8

Third Round
5	(Hong Kong) Tang Peng (Hong Kong) Jiang Huajun	7	11	7	12	11	7	11
17	(China) Xu Hui (China) Peng Luyang	11	7	11	10	4	11	8
27	(China) Zhang Jike (China) Mu Zi	11	11	11	11
(Turkey) Bora Vang (Turkey) Sirin He	4	7	8	5

Fourth Round
5	(Hong Kong) Tang Peng (Hong Kong) Jiang Huajun	12	7	3	7	4
27	(China) Zhang Jike (China) Mu Zi	10	11	11	11	11

=== Section 4 ===
First Round
13	(Germany) Christian Süß (Germany) Elke Schall	11	11	11	11
Q	(Turkey) Gencay Menge (Turkey) Fulya Ozler	9	8	3	3
8	(Republic of the Congo) Suraju Saka (Republic of the Congo) Yang Fen
9	(Greece) P. Gionis (Greece) E. Ntoulaki	w/o
5	(Japan) Kunihito Tasei (Japan) Mikei Tasei	11	4	11	13	11
12	(Belarus) V. Nekhvedovich (Belarus) Veronika Pavlovich	5	11	9	12	3
Q	(Indonesia) M. Hussein (Indonesia) Noor A. Agustin	6	6	5	5
31	(Italy) Mihai Bobocica (Italy) N. Stefanova	11	11	11	11
29	(Romania) Andrei Filimon (Romania) Elizabeta Samara	11	11	11	11
Q	(Egypt) Omar Assar (Egypt) Sara El-Sokary	5	7	4	6
3	(Croatia) Ronald Redjep (Croatia) Mirela Durak	11	9	11	7	11	7
14	(Czech Republic) Josef Simoncik (Czech Republic) Dana Hadacova	9	11	8	11	13	11
7	(Russia) Igor Rubtsov (Russia) A. Tikhomirova	11	10	11	11	11
10	(Australia) Robert Frank (Australia) Jian Fang Lay	5	12	0	0	0
2	(Japan) Koki Niwa (Japan) Misaki Morizono	10	11	13	11	11	10	1
3	(Singapore) Gao Ning (Singapore) Feng Tianwei	12	9	15	5	8	12	11

Second Round
13	(Germany) Christian Süß (Germany) Elke Schall	6	11	16	6	11	11
(Greece) Panagiotis Gionis (Greece) Ekaterina Ntoulaki	11	5	14	11	4	7
(Japan) Kunihito Tasei (Japan) Mikei Tasei	11	7	13	5	11	9	11
31	(Italy) Mihai Bobocica (Italy) Nikoleta Stefanova	4	11	11	11	8	11	7
29	(Romania) Andrei Filimon (Romania) Elizabeta Samara	11	11	8	11	11
(Czech Republic) Josef Simoncik (Czech Republic) Dana Hadacova	9	7	11	5	9
(Russia) Igor Rubtsov (Russia) Anna Tikhomirova	11	14	6	10	6	11	9
3	(Singapore) Gao Ning (Singapore) Feng Tianwei	3	12	11	12	11	6	11

Third Round
13	(Germany) Christian Süß (Germany) Elke Schall	6	11	11	11	11
(Japan) Kunihito Tasei (Japan) Mikei Tasei	11	2	1	7	6
29	(Romania) Andrei Filimon (Romania) Elizabeta Samara	11	7	7	5	11	6
3	(Singapore) Gao Ning (Singapore) Feng Tianwei	7	11	11	11	9	11

Fourth Round
13	(Germany) Christian Süß (Germany) Elke Schall	11	10	8	11	11	11
3	(Singapore) Gao Ning (Singapore) Feng Tianwei	4	12	11	6	5	3

=== Section 5 ===
First Round
4	(South Korea) Oh Sang Eun (South Korea) Dang Ye Seo	11	11	11	11
Q	(Bulgaria) Petko Gabrovski (Bulgaria) Zhana Petrova	4	7	3	4
8	(Greece) K. Papageorgiu (Greece) Christina Fili	11	5	9	4	11	10
9	(Germany) Z. Fejer-Konnerth (Germany) Kristin Silbereisen	9	11	11	11	9	12
5	(Thailand) Pha. Sanguansin (Thailand) N. Komwong	11	11	9	11	11
Q	(Armenia) Murad Asatryan (Armenia) Anna Adamyan	6	4	11	6	4
Q	(Republic of the Congo) Saheed Idowu (Republic of the Congo) Han Xing	11	6	5	8	8
21	(Austria) Robert Gardos (Austria) Li Qiangbing	4	11	11	11	11
20	(China) Li Ping (China) Cao Zhen	11	11	11	11
Q	(New Zealand) John Cordue (New Zealand) Annie Yang	1	4	5	3
Q	(Kazakhstan) A. Gerassimenko (Kazakhstan) Yelena Shagarova	8	8	7	5
14	(Italy) Stefano Tomasi (Italy) Laura Negrisoli	11	11	11	11
7	(Chinese Taipei) Chen Chien-An (Chinese Taipei) Hsiung Nai-I	12	11	11	11
10	(Brazil) Thiago Monteiro (Brazil) Mariany Nonaka	10	9	2	2
Q	(Canada) Bryan Michaud (Canada) Sara Yuen	4	2	6	8
14	(Hong Kong) Jiang Tianyi (Hong Kong) Zhang Rui	11	11	11	11

Second Round
4	(South Korea) Oh Sang Eun (South Korea) Dang Ye Seo	11	11	11	7	11
(Germany) Z. Fejer-Konnerth (Germany) Kristin Silbereisen	8	8	10	11	9
(Thailand) Pha. Sanguansin (Thailand) N. Komwong	6	7	11	6	6
21	(Austria) Robert Gardos (Austria) Li Qiangbing	11	11	9	11	11
20	(China) Li Ping (China) Cao Zhen	11	11	11	11
(Italy) Stefano Tomasi (Italy) Laura Negrisoli	8	4	8	2
(Chinese Taipei) Chen Chien-An (Chinese Taipei) Hsiung Nai-I	8	7	6	12
14	(Hong Kong) Jiang Tianyi (Hong Kong) Zhang Rui	11	11	11	14

Third Round
4	(South Korea) Oh Sang Eun (South Korea) Dang Ye Seo	11	11	11	11
21	(Austria) Robert Gardos (Austria) Li Qiangbing	8	5	8	5
20	(China) Li Ping (China) Cao Zhen	11	9	11	4	18	11
14	(Hong Kong) Jiang Tianyi (Hong Kong) Zhang Rui	9	11	9	11	16	7

Fourth Round
4	(South Korea) Oh Sang Eun (South Korea) Dang Ye Seo	9	10	11	11	12	11
20	(China) Li Ping (China) Cao Zhen	11	12	9	13	10	13

=== Section 6 ===
First Round
11	(Hong Kong) Cheung Yuk (Hong Kong) Lau Sui Fei	11	16	11	11
Q	(Malaysia) Chai Kian Beng (Malaysia) Ng Sock Khim	6	14	4	5
8	(Venezuela) Henry Mujica (Venezuela) Fabiola Ramos	4	9	6	4
9	(Ukraine) Aleksandr Didukh (Ukraine) T. Sorochynska	11	11	11	11
5	(Turkey) Cem Zeng (Turkey) Melek Hu	11	13	12	11	11
Q	(India) Amalraj A. Anthony (India) Madhurika Patkar	2	15	10	6	6
Q	(Argentina) Gaston Diego Alto (Argentina) Ana Codina	5	2	12	6
28	(France) C. Legout (France) Carole Grundisch	11	11	14	11
26	(Germany) Bastian Steger (Germany) Zhenqi Barthel	11	12	14	3	9	16
11	(India) Sharath Kamal (India) Shamini Kumaresan	9	10	12	11	11	14
3	(Egypt) El-Sayed Lashin (Egypt) Raghd Magdy	4	7	12	9	3
14	(Singapore) Cai Xiaoli (Singapore) Yu Mengyu	11	11	10	11	11
7	(Russia) Kirill Skachkov (Russia) Elena Troshneva	11	11	11	11
Q	(United States) Samson Dubina (United States) Crystal Xi Huang	8	6	5	8
Q	(Israel) Yaniv Sharon (Israel) Einat Amar	5	8	3	11	3
7	(China) Xu Xin (China) Fan Ying	11	11	11	4	11

Second Round
11	(Hong Kong) Cheung Yuk (Hong Kong) Lau Sui Fei	11	11	11	8	11
(Ukraine) Aleksandr Didukh (Ukraine) T. Sorochynska	8	5	6	11	2
(Turkey) Cem Zeng (Turkey) Melek Hu	11	11	14	5	11	10	10
28	(France) Christophe Legout (France) Carole Grundisch	6	6	16	11	9	12	12
26	(Germany) Bastian Steger (Germany) Zhenqi Barthel	11	11	11	9	11
(Singapore) Cai Xiaoli (Singapore) Yu Mengyu	9	9	7	11	8
(Russia) Kirill Skachkov (Russia) Elena Troshneva	12	4	2	5	3
7	(China) Xu Xin (China) Fan Ying	10	11	11	11	11

Third Round
11	(Hong Kong) Cheung Yuk (Hong Kong) Lau Sui Fei	9	11	11	7	7	8
28	(France) Christophe Legout (France) Carole Grundisch	11	8	5	11	11	11
26	(Germany) Bastian Steger (Germany) Zhenqi Barthel	9	6	5	8
7	(China) Xu Xin (China) Fan Ying	11	11	11	11

Fourth Round
28	(France) Christophe Legout (France) Carole Grundisch	8	9	11	4	9
7	(China) Xu Xin (China) Fan Ying	11	11	3	11	11

=== Section 7 ===
First Round
8	(Hong Kong) Leung Chu Yan (Hong Kong) Lin Ling	11	16	11	11
16	(Ukraine) Lei Kou (Ukraine) Ganna Gaponova	5	14	2	3
8	(Brazil) Gustavo Tsuboi (Brazil) Jessica Yamada	3	10	6	11	8
9	(Russia) Fedor Kuzmin (Russia) A. Voronova	11	12	11	8	11
5	(Spain) Carlos Machado (Spain) Sara Ramirez	11	11	11	11	9	11
12	(India) Sourav Chakraborty (India) Mouma Das	13	9	8	4	11	4
4	(Russia) Mikhail Paykov (Russia) Polina Mikhaylova	11	5	5	9	5
32	(Poland) Wang Zeng Yi (Poland) Natalia Partyka	7	11	11	11	11
19	(Germany) Patrick Baum (Germany) Wu Jiaduo	7	14	11	13	5	15	11
11	(Slovenia) Bojan Tokič (Slovenia) Manca Fajmut	11	12	8	11	11	17	2
3	(Spain) Alvaro Robles (Spain) Galia Dvorak	9	9	7	6
14	(Croatia) Andrej Gacina (Croatia) Andrea Bakula	11	11	11	11
7	(Belarus) Pavel Platonou (Belarus) Viktoria Pavlovich	11	9	11	11	13	11
Q	(United States) David Zhuang (United States) Ariel Hsing	5	11	5	7	15	5
2	(Ukraine) Y. Zhmudenko (Ukraine) Margaryta Pesotska	5	11	11	6	8	5
15	(China) Zhang Chao (China) Yao Yan	11	7	9	11	11	11

Second Round
8	(Hong Kong) Leung Chu Yan (Hong Kong) Lin Ling	11	14	9	11	6	11
(Russia) Fedor Kuzmin (Russia) A. Voronova	8	12	11	3	11	8
(Spain) Carlos Machado (Spain) Sara Ramirez	5	7	11	11	11	10	11
32	(Poland) Wang Zeng Yi (Poland) Natalia Partyka	11	11	4	9	4	12	9
19	(Germany) Patrick Baum (Germany) Wu Jiaduo	11	10	12	11	8	7
(Croatia) Andrej Gacina (Croatia) Andrea Bakula	9	12	14	6	11	11
(Belarus) Pavel Platonou (Belarus) Viktoria Pavlovich	6	11	8	5	3
15	(China) Zhang Chao (China) Yao Yan	11	8	11	11	11

Third Round
8	(Hong Kong) Leung Chu Yan (Hong Kong) Lin Ling	11	8	13	11	11
(Spain) Carlos Machado (Spain) Sara Ramirez	9	11	11	8	8
(Croatia) Andrej Gacina (Croatia) Andrea Bakula	6	10	9	5
15	(China) Zhang Chao (China) Yao Yan	11	12	11	11

Fourth Round
8	(Hong Kong) Leung Chu Yan (Hong Kong) Lin Ling	8	8	7	6
15	(China) Zhang Chao (China) Yao Yan	11	11	11	11

=== Section 8 ===
First Round
10	(Japan) Jun Mizutani (Japan) Sayaka Hirano	11	11	9	7	11	11
16	(Czech Republic) Antonin Gavlas (Czech Republic) Iveta Vacenovska	9	9	11	11	4	8
Q	(India) Pathik Mehta (India) Kasturi Chakraborty	7	8	4	4
9	(England) Paul Drinkhall (England) Joanna Parker	11	11	11	11
5	(Japan) Seiya Kishikawa (Japan) Kasumi Ishikawa	11	11	11	11
Q	(Macau) Leong Kin Wa (Macau) Cheong Cheng	5	7	4	6
Q	(Indonesia) Ficky Supit Santoso (Indonesia) Silir Rovani	6	3	8	8
18	(South Korea) Kim Jung-hoon (South Korea) Lee Eun-hee	11	11	11	11
30	(Czech Republic) Petr Korbel (Czech Republic) Renata Strbikova	11	11	11	11
11	(Chinese Taipei) Chuan Che-Wei (Chinese Taipei) Liu Hsing-Yin	4	5	6	3
3	(Malaysia) Muhd S. Ibrahim (Malaysia) Beh Lee Wei	8	4	4	9
14	(Chinese Taipei) Wu Chih-Chi (Chinese Taipei) Lu Yun-Feng	11	11	11	11
7	(Slovakia) Lubomir Pistej (Slovakia) Eva Odorova	11	11	11	11
Q	(Bulgaria) Teodor Yordanov (Bulgaria) Anelia Karova	2	4	7	3
2	(Egypt) Ahmed Ali Saleh (Egypt) Sara Hassan	4	3	1	16	7
2	(South Korea) Joo Sae-hyuk (South Korea) Park Mi-young	11	11	11	14	11

Second Round
10	(Japan) Jun Mizutani (Japan) Sayaka Hirano	13	4	8	11	11	11
(England) Paul Drinkhall (England) Joanna Parker	11	11	11	3	9	9
(Japan) Seiya Kishikawa (Japan) Kasumi Ishikawa	11	11	11	11
18	(South Korea) Kim Jung-hoon (South Korea) Lee Eun-hee	7	9	8	7
30	(Czech Republic) Petr Korbel (Czech Republic) Renata Strbikova	11	11	13	10	11
(Chinese Taipei) Wu Chih-Chi (Chinese Taipei) Lu Yun-Feng	7	9	11	12	7
(Slovakia) Lubomir Pistej (Slovakia) Eva Odorova	4	11	9	11	11	3	11
2	(South Korea) Joo Sae-hyuk (South Korea) Park Mi-young	11	4	11	6	7	11	7

Third Round
10	(Japan) Jun Mizutani (Japan) Sayaka Hirano	9	11	11	11	6	4	11
(Japan) Seiya Kishikawa (Japan) Kasumi Ishikawa	11	6	2	5	11	11	6
30	(Czech Republic) Petr Korbel (Czech Republic) Renata Strbikova	11	15	4	4	4
(Slovakia) Lubomir Pistej (Slovakia) Eva Odorova	5	17	11	11	11

Fourth Round
10	(Japan) Jun Mizutani (Japan) Sayaka Hirano	11	4	10	8	11
(Slovakia) Lubomir Pistej (Slovakia) Eva Odorova	8	11	12	11	13

== See also ==
List of World Table Tennis Championships medalists
