= 2015 World Table Tennis Championships – Women's doubles =

Women's doubles at the 2015 World Table Tennis Championships
- Venue: Suzhou International Expo Center
- Location: Suzhou, China
- Dates: 26 April–3 May
- Final score: 8–11, 11–8, 3–11, 11–8, 11–13, 11–8, 11–8

Medalists
Liu Shiwen; Zhu Yuling	China
Ding Ning; Li Xiaoxia	China
Li Jie; Li Qian	Netherlands; Poland
Feng Tianwei; Yu Mengyu	Singapore

The 2015 World Table Tennis Championships women's doubles was the 52nd edition of the women's doubles championship. Guo Yue and Li Xiaoxia were the defending champions.

Liu Shiwen and Zhu Yuling won the title by defeating Ding Ning and Li Xiaoxia 8–11, 11–8, 3–11, 11–8, 11–13, 11–8, 11–8 in the final.

== Seeds ==
Matches will be best of 5 games in qualification and best of 7 games in the 64-player sized main draw.

1. (Japan) Ai Fukuhara / (Japan) Misako Wakamiya (quarterfinals)
2. (Singapore) Feng Tianwei / (Singapore) Yu Mengyu (semifinals)
3. (China) Liu Shiwen / (China) Zhu Yuling (champion)
4. (Japan) Miu Hirano / (Japan) Mima Ito (second round)
5. (Poland) Katarzyna Grzybowska / (Poland) Natalia Partyka (third round)
6. (Hong Kong) Doo Hoi Kem / (Hong Kong) Lee Ho Ching (third round)
7. (China) Ding Ning / (China) Li Xiaoxia (final)
8. (South Korea) Park Young-sook / (South Korea) Yang Ha-eun (quarterfinals)
9. (Hong Kong) Jiang Huajun / (Hong Kong) Tie Ya Na (third round)
10. (Germany) Nina Mittelham / (Germany) Petrissa Solja (third round)
11. (Egypt) Nadeen El-Dawlatly / (Egypt) Dina Meshref (first round)
12. (Austria) Liu Jia / (Czech Republic) Iveta Vacenovská (third round)
13. (Republic of the Congo) Han Xing / (Republic of the Congo) Onyinyechi Nwachukwu (second round)
14. (Germany) Kristin Silbereisen / (Germany) Sabine Winter (third round)
15. (Chinese Taipei) Cheng I-ching / (Chinese Taipei) Lee I-chen (quarterfinals)
16. (Russia) Maria Dolgikh / (Russia) Polina Mikhailova (third round)
17. (North Korea) Kim Hye-song/ (North Korea) Kim Jong (third round)
18. (Chinese Taipei) Chen Szu-yu / (Chinese Taipei) Liu Hsing-yin (second round)
19. (Puerto Rico) Adriana Diaz / (Puerto Rico) Melanie Diaz (second round)
20. (Sweden) Matilda Ekholm / (Croatia) Lea Rakovac (second round)
21. (Hungary) Szandra Pergel / (Romania) Elizabeta Samara (first round)
22. (Spain) Galia Dvorak / (Spain) Sara Ramírez (second round)
23. (Czech Republic) Kateřina Pěnkavová / (Czech Republic) Renáta Štrbíková (second round)
24. (Argentina) Camila Arguelles / (Argentina) Ana Codina (first round)
25. (Chile) Natalia Castellano / (Chile) Paulina Vega (second round)
26. (Thailand) Nanthana Komwong / (China) Li Xiaodan (second round)
27. (Brazil) Gui Lin / (Brazil) Caroline Kumahara (second round)
28. (Turkey) Melek Hu / (Spain) Shen Yanfei (quarterfinals)
29. (Ukraine) Tetyana Sorochynska / (Ukraine) Ganna Gaponova (second round)
30. (Russia) Yana Noskova / (Russia) Yulia Prokhorova (second round)
31. (France) Carole Grundisch / (France) Xian Yifang (first round)
32. (Romania) Camelia Postoaca / (Romania) Bernadette Szőcs (first round)

== Draw ==
=== Key ===
- Q = Qualifier
- w/o = Walkover
- w/d = Withdraw
- r = Retired
- DQ = Disqualified

=== Finals ===
Semifinals							Final
7	(China) Ding Ning (China) Li Xiaoxia	11	11	11	11
	(Netherlands) Li Jie (Poland) Li Qian	5	2	7	6		7	(China) Ding Ning (China) Li Xiaoxia	11	8	11	8	13	8	8
3	(China) Liu Shiwen (China) Zhu Yuling	9	11	11	11	11	3	(China) Liu Shiwen (China) Zhu Yuling	8	11	3	11	11	11	11
2	(Singapore) Feng Tianwei (Singapore) Yu Mengyu	11	9	6	7	4

=== Top half ===
==== Section 1 ====
First round
1	(Japan) Fukuhara (Japan) Wakamiya	11	11	11	11
(United States) Hugh (United States) Jha	8	4	8	3
(North Korea) Ri Mi (North Korea) Ri My	11	11	13	11
31	(France) Grundisch (France) Xian	5	5	11	7
18	(Chinese Taipei) Chen (Chinese Taipei) Liu	11	11	11	11
(Colombia) Medina (Colombia) Ruano	3	4	7	4
(Slovakia) Balážová (Slovakia) Ódorová	12	11	8	7	11	7
14	(Germany) Silbereisen (Germany) Winter	14	5	11	11	9	11
10	(Germany) Mittelham (Germany) Solja	10	11	11	11	11
(Uzbekistan) Gufranova (Uzbekistan) Kim	12	6	1	7	7
(Algeria) Laid (Algeria) Loghraibi	4	5	6	5
29	(Ukraine) Sorochynska (Ukraine) Gaponova	11	11	11	11
30	(Russia) Noskova (Russia) Prokhorova	11	11	13	11
(Singapore) Li (Singapore) Lim	6	9	11	6
(Serbia) Todorović (Israel) Trosman	3	9	7	1
7	(China) Ding (China) Li Xiaox	11	11	11	11

Second round
1	(Japan) Fukuhara (Japan) Wakamiya	8	13	11	11	11
(North Korea) Ri Mi (North Korea) Ri My	11	11	2	5	4
18	(Chinese Taipei) Chen (Chinese Taipei) Liu	8	8	6	7
14	(Germany) Silbereisen (Germany) Winter	11	11	11	11
10	(Germany) Mittelham (Germany) Solja	12	11	11	11	11
29	(Ukraine) Sorochynska (Ukraine) Gaponova	10	9	9	13	8
30	(Russia) Noskova (Russia) Prokhorova	5	2	4	10
7	(China) Ding (China) Li Xiaox	11	11	11	12

Third round
1	(Japan) Fukuhara (Japan) Wakamiya	12	11	7	12	11
14	(Germany) Silbereisen (Germany) Winter	10	4	11	10	4
10	(Germany) Mittelham (Germany) Solja	8	8	6	7
7	(China) Ding (China) Li Xiaox	11	11	11	11

Quarterfinals
1	(Japan) Fukuhara (Japan) Wakamiya	8	10	5	9
7	(China) Ding (China) Li Xiaox	11	12	11	11

==== Section 2 ====
First round
6	(Hong Kong) Doo (Hong Kong) Lee	11	11	11	11
(Mexico) Serrano (Colombia) Umbacia	2	5	3	5
(Portugal) Fins (Belarus) Trigolos	9	9	7	9
22	(Spain) Dvorak (Spain) Ramírez	11	11	11	11
28	(Turkey) Hu (Spain) Shen	11	12	14	11
(Luxembourg) De Nutte (Luxembourg) Ni	8	10	12	6
(Cameroon) Hanffou (Nigeria) Oshonaike	11	14	11	11	11
11	(Egypt) El-Dawlatly (Egypt) Meshref	7	16	7	6	4
13	(Republic of the Congo) Han (Republic of the Congo) Nwachukwu	11	11	11	12
(Sri Lanka) Madurangi (Sri Lanka) Shashini	7	5	3	10
(Portugal) Martins (Portugal) Oliveira	2	10	4	6
17	(North Korea) Kim H (North Korea) Kim J	11	12	11	11
32	(Romania) Postoaca (Romania) Szőcs	5	9	7	5
(Netherlands) Li (Poland) Li	11	11	11	11
(Egypt) Helmy (Guatemala) Montufar	6	3	4	2
4	(Japan) Hirano (Japan) Ito	11	11	11	11

Second round
6	(Hong Kong) Doo (Hong Kong) Lee	9	11	11	11	9	11
22	(Spain) Dvorak (Spain) Ramírez	11	6	2	3	11	6
28	(Turkey) Hu (Spain) Shen	13	8	11	11	11
(Cameroon) Hanffou (Nigeria) Oshonaike	11	11	6	6	3
13	(Republic of the Congo) Han (Republic of the Congo) Nwachukwu	3	5	5	6
17	(North Korea) Kim H (North Korea) Kim J	11	11	11	11
(Netherlands) Li (Poland) Li	11	6	11	11	9	4	11
4	(Japan) Hirano (Japan) Ito	8	11	8	8	11	11	9

Third round
6	(Hong Kong) Doo (Hong Kong) Lee	8	8	10	7
28	(Turkey) Hu (Spain) Shen	11	11	12	11
17	(North Korea) Kim H (North Korea) Kim J	6	7	6	10
(Netherlands) Li (Poland) Li	11	11	11	12

Quarterfinals
28	(Turkey) Hu (Spain) Shen	2	6	9	4
(Netherlands) Li (Poland) Li	11	11	11	11

=== Bottom half ===
==== Section 3 ====
First round
3	(China) Liu (China) Zhu	11	11	10	11	11
(Thailand) Khetkhuan (Thailand) Paranang	7	4	12	8	7
(India) Das (India) Kumaresan	11	6	1	8	7
26	(Thailand) Komwong (China) Li Xiaod	7	11	11	11	11
19	(Puerto Rico) A Diaz (Puerto Rico) M Diaz	4	11	7	11	5	11	11
(Switzerland) Aschwanden (Switzerland) Moret	11	7	11	8	11	7	4
(Canada) Luo (Canada) Zhang	7	4	14	2	11	3
16	(Russia) Dolgikh (Russia) Mikhailova	11	11	12	11	8	11
15	(Chinese Taipei) Cheng (Chinese Taipei) Lee	11	11	11	11
(South Korea) Hwang (South Korea) Lee	4	7	9	5
(Mexico) Madrid (Mexico) Silva
24	(Argentina) Arguelles (Argentina) Codina	w/o
27	(Brazil) Gui (Brazil) Kumahara	11	11	11	2	11	11
(New Zealand) Sun (New Zealand) Yang	13	5	7	11	4	6
(Guatemala) Enriquez (Guatemala) Estrada	9	7	3	3
5	(Poland) Grzybowska (Poland) Partyka	11	11	11	11

Second round
3	(China) Liu (China) Zhu	11	13	11	11
26	(Thailand) Komwong (China) Li Xiaod	7	11	3	5
19	(Puerto Rico) A Diaz (Puerto Rico) M Diaz	11	6	3	4	2
16	(Russia) Dolgikh (Russia) Mikhailova	3	11	11	11	11
15	(Chinese Taipei) Cheng (Chinese Taipei) Lee	11	11	11	11
(Mexico) Madrid (Mexico) Silva	2	3	6	8
27	(Brazil) Gui (Brazil) Kumahara	9	9	5	4
5	(Poland) Grzybowska (Poland) Partyka	11	11	11	11

Third round
3	(China) Liu (China) Zhu	13	12	11	11
16	(Russia) Dolgikh (Russia) Mikhailova	11	10	2	5
15	(Chinese Taipei) Cheng (Chinese Taipei) Lee	9	11	11	9	11	11	13
5	(Poland) Grzybowska (Poland) Partyka	11	9	13	11	3	9	11

Quarterfinals
3	(China) Liu (China) Zhu	11	11	11	11
15	(Chinese Taipei) Cheng (Chinese Taipei) Lee	9	8	5	3

==== Section 4 ====
First round
8	(South Korea) Park (South Korea) Yang	11	13	4	11	11
(Lithuania) Paškauskienė (Ukraine) Pesotska	6	11	11	9	7
(Argentina) Iwasa (Chile) Low	8	8	4	12
23	(Czech Republic) Pěnkavová (Czech Republic) Štrbíková	11	11	11	14
25	(Chile) Castellano (Chile) Vega	15	5	11	11	10	15	11
(Croatia) Petek (Croatia) Tian	13	11	9	9	12	17	2
(Nigeria) Edem (Nigeria) Effiom
12	(Austria) Liu (Czech Republic) Vacenovská	w/o
9	(Hong Kong) Jiang (Hong Kong) Tie	11	11	11	11
(Belarus) Arlouskaya (Belarus) Baravok	4	5	6	6
(Serbia) Erdelji (Serbia) Feher	w/o
21	(Hungary) Pergel (Romania) Samara
20	(Sweden) Ekholm (Croatia) Rakovac	11	11	8	6	11	11
(Netherlands) Eerland (Netherlands) Li	9	7	11	11	9	1
(Iran) Omrani (Iran) Shahsavari	5	1	5	8
2	(Singapore) Feng (Singapore) Yu	11	11	11	11

Second round
8	(South Korea) Park (South Korea) Yang	11	11	11	11
23	(Czech Republic) Pěnkavová (Czech Republic) Štrbíková	7	1	3	7
25	(Chile) Castellano (Chile) Vega	9	4	6	3
12	(Austria) Liu (Czech Republic) Vacenovská	11	11	11	11
9	(Hong Kong) Jiang (Hong Kong) Tie	11	11	11	6	8	15
(Serbia) Erdelji (Serbia) Feher	9	5	6	11	11	13
20	(Sweden) Ekholm (Croatia) Rakovac	11	7	5	9	11	3
2	(Singapore) Feng (Singapore) Yu	7	11	11	11	3	11

Third round
8	(South Korea) Park (South Korea) Yang	8	6	11	13	13	12
12	(Austria) Liu (Czech Republic) Vacenovská	11	11	6	11	11	10
9	(Hong Kong) Jiang (Hong Kong) Tie	11	7	10	7	8
2	(Singapore) Feng (Singapore) Yu	8	11	12	11	11

Quarterfinals
8	(South Korea) Park (South Korea) Yang	8	5	7	11	9
2	(Singapore) Feng (Singapore) Yu	11	11	11	6	11
