= 2015 World Table Tennis Championships – Women's singles =

Women's singles at the 2015 World Table Tennis Championships
- Venue: Suzhou International Expo Center
- Location: Suzhou, China
- Dates: 26 April – 2 May
- Final score: 7–11, 15–13, 11–7, 11–9, 9–11, 4–11, 11–8

Medalists
gold medal	Ding Ning	China
silver medal	Liu Shiwen	China
bronze medal	Mu Zi	China
bronze medal	Li Xiaoxia	China

Li Xiaoxia was the defending champion but lost in the semifinals.

Ding Ning captured the title by defeating Liu Shiwen with 7–11, 15–13, 11–7, 11–9, 9–11, 4–11, 11–8.

== Seeds ==
Matches were best of 7 games in qualification and in the 128-player sized main draw.

1. (China) Ding Ning (champion)
2. (China) Liu Shiwen (final)
3. (China) Li Xiaoxia (semifinals)
4. (Singapore) Feng Tianwei (quarterfinals)
5. (Japan) Kasumi Ishikawa (third round)
6. (China) Zhu Yuling (quarterfinals)
7. (China) Wu Yang (quarterfinals)
8. (Japan) Ai Fukuhara (second round)
9. (South Korea) Seo Hyo-won (second round)
10. (Austria) Liu Jia (first round)
11. (Japan) Sayaka Hirano (third round)
12. (Hong Kong) Doo Hoi Kem (third round)
13. (Japan) Mima Ito (quarterfinals)
14. (Singapore) Yu Mengyu (fourth round)
15. (Romania) Elizabeta Samara (third round)
16. (South Korea) Yang Ha-eun (fourth round)
17. (Germany) Petrissa Solja (second round)
18. (North Korea) Ri Myong-sun (third round)
19. (Netherlands) Li Jie (fourth round)
20. (Turkey) Melek Hu (second round)
21. (Hong Kong) Lee Ho Ching (second round)
22. (Hong Kong) Jiang Huajun (fourth round)
23. (Spain) Shen Yanfei (third round)
24. (Japan) Miu Hirano (third round)
25. (Chinese Taipei) Chen Szu-yu (third round)
26. (Netherlands) Li Jiao (third round)
27. (Germany) Kristin Silbereisen (first round)
28. (Chinese Taipei) Cheng I-ching (fourth round)
29. (Germany) Irene Ivancan (fourth round)
30. (Poland) Li Qian (third round)
31. (Hong Kong) Tie Ya Na (third round)
32. (Chinese Taipei) Lee I-chen (second round)
33. (North Korea) Ri Mi-gyong (second round)
34. (Czech Republic) Iveta Vacenovská (second round)
35. (Ukraine) Margaryta Pesotska (third round)
36. (Germany) Sabine Winter (second round)
37. (Ukraine) Tetyana Sorochynska (fourth round)
38. (Romania) Bernadette Szőcs (second round)
39. (Russia) Polina Mikhailova (second round)
40. (North Korea) Kim Jong (second round)
41. (Poland) Natalia Partyka (second round)
42. (France) Carole Grundisch (second round)
43. (South Korea) Park Young-sook (third round)
44. (Sweden) Matilda Ekholm (fourth round)
45. (Luxembourg) Ni Xialian (second round)
46. (Russia) Yana Noskova (second round)
47. (Slovakia) Barbora Balážová (second round)
48. (Lithuania) Rūta Paškauskienė (second round)
49. (Romania) Camelia Postoaca (second round)
50. (Netherlands) Britt Eerland (second round)
51. (Germany) Nina Mittelham (second round)
52. (Croatia) Tian Yuan (second round)
53. (France) Xian Yi Fang (second round)
54. (Poland) Katarzyna Grzybowska (third round)
55. (Russia) Maria Dolgikh (third round)
56. (Czech Republic) Renata Štrbíková (second round)
57. (Canada) Zhang Mo (second round)
58. (Ukraine) Ganna Gaponova (third round)
59. (Spain) Sara Ramírez (first round)
60. (Egypt) Dina Meshref (first round)
61. (Russia) Yulia Prokhorova (first round)
62. (Spain) Galia Dvorak (second round)
63. (Singapore) Li Isabelle (first round)
64. (Thailand) Nanthana Komwong (first round)

== Draw ==
=== Key ===
- Q = Qualifier
- w/o = Walkover
- w/d = Withdraw
- r = Retired
- DQ = Disqualified

=== Finals ===
Quarterfinals
1	(China) Ding Ning	11	11	11	7	6	8	11
7	(China) Wu Yang	8	7	5	11	11	11	8
(China) Mu Zi	11	11	11	11
4	(Singapore) Feng Tianwei	5	2	9	5
3	(China) Li Xiaoxia	9	14	11	11	13	11
13	(Japan) Mima Ito	11	16	2	7	11	2
6	(China) Zhu Yuling	3	11	5	7	3
2	(China) Liu Shiwen	11	8	11	11	11

Semifinals
1	(China) Ding Ning	9	11	12	5	11	1	11
(China) Mu Zi	11	6	10	11	6	11	6
3	(China) Li Xiaoxia	6	11	9	7	8
2	(China) Liu Shiwen	11	8	11	11	11

Final
1	(China) Ding Ning	7	15	11	11	9	4	11
2	(China) Liu Shiwen	11	13	7	9	11	11	8

=== Top half ===
==== Section 1 ====
First round
1	(China) Ding	11	11	11	11
(Nigeria) Oshonaike	2	3	4	7
(Hungary) Pergel	9	5	11	5	11	6
41	(Poland) Partyka	11	11	4	11	8	11
40	(North Korea) Kim J	11	11	11	11
(Switzerland) Moret	8	3	8	1
(India) Batra	11	7	8	7	4
24	(Japan) M Hirano	7	11	11	11	11
29	(Germany) Ivancan	11	12	11	11
(United States) Guan	7	10	4	9
(Slovenia) Fajmut	6	11	11	4	11	13
61	(Russia) Prokhorova	11	7	9	11	4	11
43	(South Korea) Park	11	11	11	11
(Singapore) Yee	5	1	5	3
(United States) Jha	5	1	5	8
9	(South Korea) Seo	11	11	11	11

Second round
1	(China) Ding	11	11	11	11
41	(Poland) Partyka	8	1	2	6
40	(North Korea) Kim J	9	9	11	9	13
24	(Japan) M Hirano	11	11	7	11	15
29	(Germany) Ivancan	11	11	11	11
(Slovenia) Fajmut	5	8	2	5
43	(South Korea) Park	11	3	10	11	11	11
9	(South Korea) Seo	4	11	12	8	6	8

Third round
1	(China) Ding	11	11	11	11
24	(Japan) M Hirano	5	6	1	6
29	(Germany) Ivancan	11	7	9	11	11	8	11
43	(South Korea) Park	7	11	11	7	9	11	8

Fourth round
1	(China) Ding	11	11	11	11
29	(Germany) Ivancan	4	7	9	8

==== Section 2 ====
First round
15	(Romania) Samara	11	11	11	11
(Belarus) Arlouskaya	7	9	5	7
(Sweden) Jonsson	7	8	6	7
51	(Germany) Mittelham	11	11	11	11
52	(Croatia) Tian	11	11	11	11
(Iran) Samet	4	7	6	9
(Puerto Rico) Diaz	7	5	7	7
28	(Chinese Taipei) Cheng	11	11	11	11
32	(Chinese Taipei) Lee	11	11	11	5	10	11
(Malaysia) Ng	4	7	6	11	12	7
(Puerto Rico) Rios	7	6	8	5
58	(Ukraine) Gaponova	11	11	11	11
47	(Slovakia) Balážová	11	11	16	11
(Chile) Vega	8	6	14	3
(Luxembourg) De Nutte	4	2	3	4
7	(China) Wu	11	11	11	11

Second round
15	(Romania) Samara	13	13	11	11	9	11
51	(Germany) Mittelham	11	15	3	7	11	9
52	(Croatia) Tian	6	8	4	11	4
28	(Chinese Taipei) Cheng	11	11	11	9	11
32	(Chinese Taipei) Lee	9	9	6	11	8
58	(Ukraine) Gaponova	11	11	11	8	11
47	(Slovakia) Balážová	7	6	2	11
7	(China) Wu	11	11	11	13

Third round
15	(Romania) Samara	7	12	9	8	6
28	(Chinese Taipei) Cheng	11	10	11	11	11
58	(Ukraine) Gaponova	4	5	5	6
7	(China) Wu	11	11	11	11

Fourth round
28	(Chinese Taipei) Cheng	9	11	4	3	1
7	(China) Wu	11	9	11	11	11

==== Section 3 ====
First round
5	(Japan) Ishikawa	11	11	11	11
(Kazakhstan) Sladkova	6	6	6	5
(India) Kumaresan	2	5	4	9
48	(Lithuania) Paškauskienė	11	11	11	11
56	(Czech Republic) Štrbíková	11	13	7	11	11
(Brazil) Kumahara	9	11	11	7	5
(China) Mu	11	12	14	7	16
27	(Germany) Silbereisen	2	10	12	11	14
20	(Turkey) Hu	11	11	11	11
(Bulgaria) Karova	5	3	8	7
(Brazil) Gui	1	5	11	6	8
35	(Ukraine) Pesotska	11	11	9	11	11
44	(Sweden) Ekholm	11	11	11	11
(Canada) Luo	6	8	3	9
(South Korea) Lee	3	4	11	11	11	11
10	(Austria) Liu	11	11	8	7	8	7

Second round
5	(Japan) Ishikawa	11	11	11	12
48	(Lithuania) Paškauskienė	5	8	8	10
56	(Czech Republic) Štrbíková	8	12	4	4
(China) Mu	11	14	11	11
20	(Turkey) Hu	4	3	2	7
35	(Ukraine) Pesotska	11	11	11	11
44	(Sweden) Ekholm	11	11	7	11	12
(South Korea) Lee	9	7	11	2	10

Third round
5	(Japan) Ishikawa	7	10	10	4
(China) Mu	11	12	12	11
35	(Ukraine) Pesotska	14	5	11	11	9
44	(Sweden) Ekholm	16	11	13	5	11

Fourth round
(China) Mu	12	13	11	11
44	(Sweden) Ekholm	10	11	5	3

==== Section 4 ====
First round
14	(Singapore) Yu	13	11	7	11	11
(Hong Kong) Li	11	4	11	2	5
(Portugal) Oliveira	11	2	11	12	11
60	(Egypt) Meshref	9	11	6	10	9
59	(Spain) Ramírez	6	10	7	11
(Slovakia) Ódorová	11	12	11	13
(Kazakhstan) Gats	6	1	4	1
30	(Poland) Li	11	11	11	11
17	(Germany) Solja	11	11	11	11
(Malaysia) Lee	3	9	4	6
(Czech Republic) Pěnkavová	11	10	2	5	7
54	(Poland) Grzybowska	7	12	11	11	11
36	(Germany) Winter	11	11	11	11
(Colombia) Ruano	9	3	2	7
(Romania) Hîrîci	6	3	7	6
4	(Singapore) Feng	11	11	11	11

Second round
14	(Singapore) Yu	11	11	13	11
(Portugal) Oliveira	3	2	11	5
(Slovakia) Ódorová	6	9	9	3
30	(Poland) Li	11	11	11	11
17	(Germany) Solja	3	11	11	8	3	11	5
54	(Poland) Grzybowska	11	7	8	11	11	8	11
36	(Germany) Winter	9	2	6	8
4	(Singapore) Feng	11	11	11	11

Third round
14	(Singapore) Yu	15	11	11	11
30	(Poland) Li	13	8	3	5
54	(Poland) Grzybowska	5	4	9	11	4
4	(Singapore) Feng	11	11	11	6	11

Fourth round
14	(Singapore) Yu	9	9	11	10	9
4	(Singapore) Feng	11	11	9	12	11

=== Bottom half ===
==== Section 5 ====
First round
3	(China) Li	11	11	11	11
(South Korea) Hwang	2	9	8	6
(Egypt) El-Dawlatly	8	3	11	6	3
57	(Canada) Zhang	11	11	5	11	11
39	(Russia) Mikhailova	11	7	13	11	11
(India) Das	6	11	11	6	6
(Slovenia) Pavčnik	5	3	7	3
18	(North Korea) Ri	11	11	11	11
22	(Hong Kong) Jiang	7	8	9	11	11	11	11
(Thailand) Khetkhuan	11	11	11	9	5	7	7
(Israel) Trosman	5	9	5	4
45	(Luxembourg) Ni	11	11	11	11
64	(Thailand) Komwong	8	11	11	8	11	11	9
(Czech Republic) Matelová	11	5	9	11	4	13	11
(Brazil) Silva	7	7	12	8	4
11	(Japan) S Hirano	11	11	10	11	11

Second round
3	(China) Li	11	11	11	12
57	(Canada) Zhang	6	6	6	10
39	(Russia) Mikhailova	4	11	9	10	11	8
18	(North Korea) Ri	11	8	11	12	8	11
22	(Hong Kong) Jiang	11	7	6	12	14	11
45	(Luxembourg) Ni	5	11	11	10	12	9
(Czech Republic) Matelová	11	11	4	12	11	11	11
11	(Japan) S Hirano	9	13	11	14	6	9	6

Third round
3	(China) Li	11	11	11	11
18	(North Korea) Ri	4	8	5	1
22	(Hong Kong) Jiang	9	11	12	11	14	11
(Czech Republic) Matelová	11	7	10	8	16	7

Fourth round
3	(China) Li	11	11	11	12
22	(Hong Kong) Jiang	6	3	6	10

==== Section 6 ====
First round
13	(Japan) Ito	11	11	10	11	11
(Colombia) Medina	7	2	12	6	8
(Australia) Lay	12	11	15	11
63	(Singapore) Li	10	6	13	4
46	(Russia) Noskova	6	11	4	11	10	11	11
(Mexico) Silva	11	9	11	4	12	5	7
(Greece) Toliou	7	11	11	8	8	10
25	(Chinese Taipei) Chen	11	9	6	11	11	12
21	(Hong Kong) Lee	16	11	16	11
(Slovenia) Galič	14	3	14	8
(United States) Hugh	8	4	2	7
55	(Russia) Dolgikh	11	11	11	11
37	(Ukraine) Sorochynska	11	12	11	11
(Lithuania) Stuckytė	4	10	8	9
(Serbia) Feher	6	7	9	8
8	(Japan) Fukuhara	11	11	11	11

Second round
13	(Japan) Ito	11	13	11	11
(Australia) Lay	7	11	6	6
46	(Russia) Noskova	6	7	7	6
25	(Chinese Taipei) Chen	11	11	11	11
21	(Hong Kong) Lee	8	11	5	11	11	9	10
55	(Russia) Dolgikh	11	9	11	3	6	11	12
37	(Ukraine) Sorochynska	3	11	6	11	11	12
8	(Japan) Fukuhara	11	7	11	9	3	10

Third round
13	(Japan) Ito	11	7	11	11	12
25	(Chinese Taipei) Chen	4	11	8	2	10
55	(Russia) Dolgikh	7	8	12	11	7
37	(Ukraine) Sorochynska	11	11	14	6	11

Fourth round
13	(Japan) Ito	11	11	10	11	12
37	(Ukraine) Sorochynska	5	8	12	9	10

==== Section 7 ====
First round
6	(China) Zhu	11	11	11	11
(Chinese Taipei) Liu	7	6	1	3
(Republic of the Congo) Han	6	15	8	11	3	6
34	(Czech Republic) Vacenovská	11	13	11	6	11	11
50	(Netherlands) Eerland	11	12	11	2	11
(Serbia) Todorović	6	10	4	11	4
(Greece) Papadaki	5	6	7	7
31	(Hong Kong) Tie	11	11	11	11
19	(Netherlands) Li Jie	11	14	11	11
(Italy) Vivarelli	7	12	4	4
(Austria) Li	6	11	7	10	11	7
62	(Spain) Dvorak	11	9	11	12	8	11
33	(North Korea) Ri	11	9	11	11	12
(Uruguay) Lorenzotti	3	11	5	4	10
(North Korea) Kim H	5	13	11	6	7	8
12	(Hong Kong) Doo	11	11	6	11	11	11

Second round
6	(China) Zhu	11	11	11	6	11
34	(Czech Republic) Vacenovská	6	5	7	11	8
50	(Netherlands) Eerland	11	11	7	10	10
31	(Hong Kong) Tie	9	13	11	12	12
19	(Netherlands) Li Jie	11	15	11	11
62	(Spain) Dvorak	2	13	8	6
33	(North Korea) Ri	8	11	6	6	11	12	7
12	(Hong Kong) Doo	11	6	11	11	8	10	11

Third round
6	(China) Zhu	8	11	11	11	11
31	(Hong Kong) Tie	11	5	9	9	2
19	(Netherlands) Li Jie	11	11	11	11
12	(Hong Kong) Doo	7	7	9	5

Fourth round
6	(China) Zhu	11	11	11	11
19	(Netherlands) Li Jie	5	3	6	2

==== Section 8 ====
First round
16	(South Korea) Yang	15	11	11	11	11
(Italy) Piccolin	17	2	7	8	5
(Israel) Gelman	11	3	7	5	3
42	(France) Grundisch	6	11	11	11	11
49	(Romania) Postoaca	11	11	11	11
(Serbia) Erdelji	7	8	8	1
(Thailand) Sawettabut	11	11	11	5	9	5	6
23	(Spain) Shen	4	7	6	11	11	11	11
26	(Netherlands) Li Jiao	9	11	9	11	11	11
(Croatia) Rakovac	11	9	11	6	7	6
(Cameroon) Hanffou	5	6	2	10
53	(France) Xian	11	11	11	12
38	(Romania) Szőcs	11	11	11	11
(Colombia) Umbacia	2	3	3	3
(Croatia) Petek	2	2	1	8
2	(China) Liu	11	11	11	11

Second round
16	(South Korea) Yang	11	9	9	11	11	11
42	(France) Grundisch	5	11	11	9	8	5
49	(Romania) Postoaca	9	9	6	2
23	(Spain) Shen	11	11	11	11
26	(Netherlands) Li Jiao	11	12	6	11	11
53	(France) Xian	5	10	11	8	9
38	(Romania) Szőcs	6	8	3	6
2	(China) Liu	11	11	11	11

Third round
16	(South Korea) Yang	7	11	6	11	14	14
23	(Spain) Shen	11	9	11	7	12	12
26	(Netherlands) Li Jiao	3	5	7	5
2	(China) Liu	11	11	11	11

Fourth round
16	(South Korea) Yang	5	4	6	3
2	(China) Liu	11	11	11	11
