= 2007 World Table Tennis Championships – Women's singles =

Women's singles at the 2007 World Table Tennis Championships
- Venue: Dom Sportova
- Location: Zagreb, Croatia
- Final score: 8–11, 11–7, 4–11, 2–11, 11–5, 11–2, 11–8

Medalists
gold medal	Guo Yue	China
silver medal	Li Xiaoxia	China
bronze medal	Zhang Yining	China
bronze medal	Guo Yan	China

The 2007 World Table Tennis Championships women's singles event took place in Zagreb, Croatia, between May 21 and May 27, 2007.

== Seeds ==
1. (China) Zhang Yining (semifinals)
2. (China) Wang Nan (quarterfinals)
3. (China) Guo Yan (semifinals)
4. (China) Guo Yue (champion)
5. (China) Li Xiaoxia (final)
6. (Hong Kong) Tie Ya Na (second round)
7. (Singapore) Li Jiawei (third round)
8. (Singapore) Wang Yuegu (fourth round)
9. (Hong Kong) Jiang Huajun (third round)
10. (Japan) Ai Fukuhara (third round)
11. (South Korea) Kim Kyung-ah (quarterfinals)
12. (United States) Gao Jun (third round)
13. (Austria) Liu Jia (fourth round)
14. (Netherlands) Li Jiao (fourth round)
15. (Hong Kong) Lin Ling (third round)
16. (Japan) Sayaka Hirano (third round)
17. (Singapore) Sun Beibei (third round)
18. (Hong Kong) Zhang Rui (third round)
19. (South Korea) Park Mi-young (third round)
20. (Japan) Haruna Fukuoka (second round)
21. (Germany) Wu Jiaduo (third round)
22. (Italy) Wenling Tan Monfardini (third round)
23. (Belarus) Viktoria Pavlovich (first round)
24. (Hong Kong) Lau Sui Fei (fourth round)
25. (Hungary) Krisztina Tóth (third round)
26. (Croatia) Tamara Boroš (second round)
27. (Italy) Nikoleta Stefanova (second round)
28. (Germany) Nicole Struse (third round)
29. (Russia) Svetlana Ganina (third round)
30. (Germany) Elke Schall (second round)
31. (South Korea) Moon Hyun-jung (second round)
32. (China) Peng Luyang (quarterfinals)

== Finals ==
Quarterfinals
1	(China) Zhang Yining	11	11	11	16
11	(South Korea) Kim Kyung-ah	3	4	6	14
(United States) Wang Chen	6	3	1	7
4	(China) Guo Yue	11	11	11	11
3	(China) Guo Yan	11	11	11	7	11
32	(China) Peng Luyang	6	6	9	11	8
5	(China) Li Xiaoxia	11	11	12	14	11
2	(China) Wang Nan	5	6	10	16	8

Semifinals
1	(China) Zhang Yining	8	7	9	4
4	(China) Guo Yue	11	11	11	11
3	(China) Guo Yan	7	11	5	5	5
5	(China) Li Xiaoxia	11	5	11	11	11

Final
4	(China) Guo Yue	8	11	4	2	11	11	11
5	(China) Li Xiaoxia	11	7	11	11	5	2	8

== Main draw ==
=== Top half ===
==== Section 1 ====
First round
1	(China) Zhang Yining	11	11	11	11
(Malaysia) Ng Sock Khim	6	3	2	5
(Russia) Anna Tikhomirova	11	4	8	11	8	11	8
(Netherlands) Elena Timina	7	11	11	4	11	7	11
(France) Xian Yi Fang	11	11	11	11
(Denmark) Mie Skov	4	8	5	8
(Serbia) Anamaria Erdelji	6	9	7	4
22	(Italy) W. Tan Monfardini	11	11	11	11
24	(Hong Kong) Lau Sui Fei	11	11	11	11
(Netherlands) Linda Creemers	5	5	5	4
(Greece) Christina Fili	6	11	2	11	4	7
(Croatia) Sandra Paović	11	5	11	6	11	11
(North Korea) Ko Un Gyong	10	14	6	11	12
(Russia) Yulia Prokhorova	12	16	11	9	11
(New Zealand) Karen Li	5	2	3	11	5
12	(United States) Gao Jun	11	11	11	9	11

Second round
1	(China) Zhang Yining	11	11	11	12
(Netherlands) Elena Timina	5	8	2	10
(France) Xian Yi Fang	5	7	7	3
22	(Italy) W. Tan Monfardini	11	11	11	11
24	(Hong Kong) Lau Sui Fei	11	12	7	11	10	11
(Croatia) Sandra Paović	8	10	11	9	12	8
(Russia) Yulia Prokhorova	3	13	3	4	1
12	(United States) Gao Jun	11	11	11	11	11

Third round
1	(China) Zhang Yining	w/o
22	(Italy) W. Tan Monfardini
24	(Hong Kong) Lau Sui Fei	11	12	7	11	11
12	(United States) Gao Jun	5	10	11	5	5

Fourth round
1	(China) Zhang Yining	11	11	11	11
24	(Hong Kong) Lau Sui Fei	6	9	5	2

==== Section 2 ====
First round
11	(South Korea) Kim Kyung-ah	11	11	11	11
(Malaysia) Beh Lee Wei	7	7	9	5
(India) Mouma Das	8	4	4	7
(Russia) Irina Kotikhina	11	11	11	11
(Belarus) Veronika Pavlovich	7	12	11	10	11	10	11
(Israel) Marina Kravchenko	11	10	7	12	7	12	8
(Serbia) Gabriela Feher	5	8	7	11	11
17	(Singapore) Sun Beibei	11	11	11	8	13
31	(South Korea) Moon Hyun-jung	12	12	11	11
(Ukraine) Anastasya Koltsova	10	10	3	3
(Ukraine) Ganna Gaponova	9	8	11	4	4
(North Korea) Kim Jong	11	11	9	11	11
(Chinese Taipei) Lu Yun-Feng	7	11	11	7	11	11
(Netherlands) Carla Nouwen	11	8	7	11	3	3
(Sweden) Carina Jonsson	6	4	11	7	4
8	(Singapore) Wang Yuegu	11	11	9	11	11

Second round
11	(South Korea) Kim Kyung-ah	11	9	11	3	11	11
(Russia) Irina Kotikhina	2	11	6	11	3	9
(Belarus) Veronika Pavlovich	4	11	11	7	13	5	9
17	(Singapore) Sun Beibei	11	6	5	11	11	11	11
31	(South Korea) Moon Hyun-jung	8	8	4	9
(North Korea) Kim Jong	11	11	11	11
(Chinese Taipei) Lu Yun-Feng	12	7	6	4
8	(Singapore) Wang Yuegu	14	11	11	11

Third round
11	(South Korea) Kim Kyung-ah	11	8	11	11	11
17	(Singapore) Sun Beibei	6	11	7	3	4
(North Korea) Kim Jong	7	3	3	11	6
8	(Singapore) Wang Yuegu	11	11	11	7	11

Fourth round
11	(South Korea) Kim Kyung-ah	8	11	11	11	11
8	(Singapore) Wang Yuegu	11	3	7	3	9

==== Section 3 ====
First round
6	(Hong Kong) Tie Ya Na	11	11	11	11
(United States) Huang Crystal Xi	6	5	7	7
(Austria) Veronika Heine	8	7	11	12	9
(United States) Wang Chen	11	11	4	14	11
(Japan) Hiroko Fujii	11	11	11	5	11
(Czech Republic) Katerina Penkavova	9	8	2	11	5
(England) Kelly Sibley	7	2	5	12
19	(South Korea) Park Mi-young	11	11	11	14
20	(Japan) Haruna Fukuoka	11	11	11	11
(Serbia) Ema Rečko	9	3	6	3
(Russia) Anastasia Voronova	6	12	11	7	10	11	9
(Romania) Daniela Dodean	11	10	7	11	12	9	11
(Czech Republic) Iveta Vacenovska	12	11	11	11	3	11
(North Korea) Kim Hye-Song	14	9	3	5	11	8
(Poland) Natalia Bak	12	4	12	6	3
10	(Japan) Ai Fukuhara	10	11	14	11	11

Second round
6	(Hong Kong) Tie Ya Na	12	8	11	5	6
(United States) Wang Chen	14	11	6	11	11
(Japan) Hiroko Fujii	9	4	5	8
19	(South Korea) Park Mi-young	11	11	11	11
20	(Japan) Haruna Fukuoka	11	11	6	5	4	12
(Romania) Daniela Dodean	4	5	11	11	11	14
(Czech Republic) Iveta Vacenovska	2	6	9	9
10	(Japan) Ai Fukuhara	11	11	11	11

Third round
(United States) Wang Chen	9	11	11	11	11
19	(South Korea) Park Mi-young	11	5	3	7	6
(Romania) Daniela Dodean	12	11	11	11
10	(Japan) Ai Fukuhara	10	9	8	9

Fourth round
(United States) Wang Chen	13	5	15	11	11
(Romania) Daniela Dodean	11	11	13	5	9

==== Section 4 ====
First round
15	(Hong Kong) Lin Ling	11	11	11	11
(Ukraine) Margaryta Pesotska	8	5	12	9
(France) Sarah Hanffou	11	7	7	7	9
(Hungary) Petra Lovas	5	11	11	11	11
(China) Yao Yan	11	11	11	12
(Spain) Galia Dvorak	8	6	6	10
(Slovakia) Lenka Kmotorkova	5	11	6	5	7
27	(Italy) Nikoleta Stefanova	11	7	11	11	11
21	(Germany) Wu Jiaduo	7	13	11	13	13
(Ukraine) Tetyana Sorochynska	11	11	8	11	11
(North Korea) O Un-Jong	8	7	7	7
(Poland) Xu Jie	11	11	11	11
(Hungary) Georgina Póta	12	10	11	14	11
(Greece) Maria Mirou	10	12	5	12	9
(Poland) Natalia Partyka	5	8	7	5
4	(China) Guo Yue	11	11	11	11

Second round
15	(Hong Kong) Lin Ling	11	11	7	9	11	11
(Hungary) Petra Lovas	5	7	11	11	5	8
(China) Yao Yan	11	11	11	11
27	(Italy) Nikoleta Stefanova	9	5	6	2
21	(Germany) Wu Jiaduo	9	11	11	11	7	11	11
(Poland) Xu Jie	11	3	13	8	11	9	3
(Hungary) Georgina Póta	11	7	7	3	5
4	(China) Guo Yue	9	11	11	11	11

Third round
15	(Hong Kong) Lin Ling	7	11	11	9	11	5	14
(China) Yao Yan	11	5	6	11	7	11	16
21	(Germany) Wu Jiaduo	10	4	12	9	3
4	(China) Guo Yue	12	11	10	11	11

Fourth round
(China) Yao Yan	12	7	5	7	11	8
4	(China) Guo Yue	10	11	11	11	8	11

=== Bottom half ===
==== Section 5 ====
First round
3	(China) Guo Yan	12	11	11	11
(Bulgaria) Katalina Gatinska	10	4	4	7
(Croatia) Andrea Bakula	7	13	11	8	7
(Chinese Taipei) Huang Yi-hua	11	11	13	11	11
(South Korea) Kim Jung-hyun	11	11	6	14	11
(United States) Tawny Banh Thua	5	6	11	12	6
(Romania) Iulia Necula	11	11	7	9	4	8
28	(Germany) Nicole Struse	1	8	11	11	11	11
23	(Belarus) Viktoria Pavlovich	9	9	7	12	6
(Australia) Miao Miao	11	11	11	10	11
(Turkey) Nevin Mutlu	9	3	7	8
(Romania) Elizabeta Samara	11	11	11	11
(France) Carole Grundisch	11	11	12	8	11	10	10
(South Korea) Cho Ha-La	9	6	14	11	6	12	12
(United States) Judy Hugh	4	5	8	4
16	(Japan) Sayaka Hirano	11	11	11	11

Second round
3	(China) Guo Yan	12	11	11	11
(Chinese Taipei) Huang Yi-hua	10	7	5	4
(South Korea) Kim Jung-hyun	10	13	14	8	9	11	9
28	(Germany) Nicole Struse	12	11	12	11	11	7	11
(Australia) Miao Miao	11	11	10	11	11	8	5
(Romania) Elizabeta Samara	8	13	12	7	6	11	11
(South Korea) Cho Ha-La	7	3	11	6	9
16	(Japan) Sayaka Hirano	11	11	5	11	11

Third round
3	(China) Guo Yan	11	11	9	12	11
28	(Germany) Nicole Struse	8	7	11	10	8
(Romania) Elizabeta Samara	9	6	11	11	11	11
16	(Japan) Sayaka Hirano	11	11	8	9	6	8

Fourth round
3	(China) Guo Yan	11	11	9	11	11
(Romania) Elizabeta Samara	4	7	11	4	3

==== Section 6 ====
First round
9	(Hong Kong) Jiang Huajun	11	11	11	11
(Serbia) Eva Tapai	3	7	7	8
(Chinese Taipei) Cheng I-Ching	7	11	9	3	4
(Austria) Li Qiangbing	11	5	11	11	11
(Thailand) Nanthana Komwong	11	11	11	11
(Italy) Wang Yu	9	4	6	6
(Croatia) Sanja Paukovic	2	6	5	3
32	(China) Peng Luyang	11	11	11	11
26	(Croatia) Tamara Boroš	8	11	11	11	12	7	11
(Slovenia) Biljana Todorovic	11	7	7	8	14	11	8
(India) Poulomi Ghatak	3	4	5	9
(South Korea) Lee Eun-Hee	11	11	11	11
(Belarus) Tatyana Kostromina	12	11	11	11
(Israel) Dana Saporta	10	6	2	8
(Sweden) Matilda Ekholm	5	12	8	10	11	7
7	(Singapore) Li Jiawei	11	10	11	12	6	11

Second round
9	(Hong Kong) Jiang Huajun	11	11	11	11
(Austria) Li Qiangbing	8	8	6	0
(Thailand) Nanthana Komwong	1	7	5	4
32	(China) Peng Luyang	11	11	11	11
26	(Croatia) Tamara Boroš	11	4	9	8	7
(South Korea) Lee Eun-Hee	9	11	11	11	11
(Belarus) Tatyana Kostromina	4	7	8	11	9
7	(Singapore) Li Jiawei	11	11	11	8	11

Third round
9	(Hong Kong) Jiang Huajun	7	11	5	11	8	11	6
32	(China) Peng Luyang	11	7	11	6	11	6	11
(South Korea) Lee Eun-Hee	11	11	11	11	14
7	(Singapore) Li Jiawei	9	6	9	13	12

Fourth round
32	(China) Peng Luyang	11	8	11	11	11
(South Korea) Lee Eun-Hee	2	11	7	4	5

==== Section 7 ====
First round
5	(China) Li Xiaoxia	11	12	11	11
(Czech Republic) Ivana Weberova	6	10	8	6
(Germany) Zhengi Barthel	6	10	11	12	9
(Japan) Reiko Hiura	11	12	4	14	11
(Germany) Kristin Silbereisen	11	7	9	5	9
(Chinese Taipei) Pan Li-Chun	6	11	11	11	11
(Slovenia) Martina Safran	2	5	2	5
29	(Russia) Svetlana Ganina	11	11	11	11
25	(Hungary) Krisztina Tóth	20	12	11	10	11
(Thailand) Anissara Muangsuk	18	10	5	12	8
(Hungary) Szandra Pergel	5	5	5	11	5
(Spain) Sara Ramirez	11	11	11	6	11
(Czech Republic) Renata Strbikova	4	13	11	11	11
(France) Laurie Phai Pang	11	11	3	3	5
(Greece) Ekaterina Ntoulaki	5	6	2	12
14	(Netherlands) Li Jiao	11	11	11	14

Second round
5	(China) Li Xiaoxia	15	11	11	11
(Japan) Reiko Hiura	13	5	6	9
(Chinese Taipei) Pan Li-Chun	6	3	2	3
29	(Russia) Svetlana Ganina	11	11	11	11
25	(Hungary) Krisztina Tóth	11	11	9	8	11	11
(Spain) Sara Ramirez	4	6	11	11	6	8
(Czech Republic) Renata Strbikova	3	7	9	11	8
14	(Netherlands) Li Jiao	11	11	11	6	11

Third round
5	(China) Li Xiaoxia	14	11	11	14
29	(Russia) Svetlana Ganina	12	4	7	12
25	(Hungary) Krisztina Tóth	5	6	11	9	9
14	(Netherlands) Li Jiao	11	11	6	11	11

Fourth round
5	(China) Li Xiaoxia	11	11	12	11	11
14	(Netherlands) Li Jiao	8	7	14	5	2

==== Section 8 ====
First round
13	(Austria) Liu Jia	12	11	11	11
(Bulgaria) Assia Kassabova	10	5	7	8
(Ukraine) Tetyana Tkachova	11	11	11	11	11
(Italy) Laura Negrisoli	8	3	13	7	6
(Dominican Republic) Wu Xue	11	11	11	11
(Chinese Taipei) Lee I-Chen	8	7	5	2
(Venezuela) Fabiola Ramos	7	3	14	11	4	8
30	(Germany) Elke Schall	11	11	12	9	11	11
18	(Hong Kong) Zhang Rui	11	5	11	11	11
(Australia) Stephanie Xu Sang	5	11	7	6	2
(Poland) Marta Golota	11	5	9	14	6	3
(Croatia) Cornelia Vaida	8	11	11	12	11	11
(Spain) Zhu Fang	11	15	13	11
(Slovakia) Viktoria Lucenkova	3	13	11	3
(Canada) Zhang Mo	6	8	1	6
2	(China) Wang Nan	11	11	11	11

Second round
13	(Austria) Liu Jia	11	12	11	11
(Ukraine) Tetyana Tkachova	2	10	8	2
(Dominican Republic) Wu Xue	11	11	11	7	11
30	(Germany) Elke Schall	9	6	9	11	7
18	(Hong Kong) Zhang Rui	11	11	11	11
(Croatia) Cornelia Vaida	8	4	7	7
(Spain) Zhu Fang	7	7	8	11	8
2	(China) Wang Nan	11	11	11	8	11

Third round
13	(Austria) Liu Jia	5	11	11	11	14
(Dominican Republic) Wu Xue	11	3	9	4	12
18	(Hong Kong) Zhang Rui	10	5	6	13
2	(China) Wang Nan	12	11	11	15

Fourth round
13	(Austria) Liu Jia	4	11	7	10	6
2	(China) Wang Nan	11	3	11	12	11
