= 2011 World Table Tennis Championships – Women's doubles =

Women's doubles at the 2011 World Table Tennis Championships
- Venue: Rotterdam Ahoy
- Location: Rotterdam, Netherlands
- Dates: 10–15 May
- Final score: 11–8, 11–5, 13–11, 11–8

Medalists
gold medal	Guo Yue; Li Xiaoxia	China
silver medal	Ding Ning; Guo Yan	China
bronze medal	Jiang Huajun; Tie Ya Na	Hong Kong
bronze medal	Kim Kyung-ah; Park Mi-young	South Korea

The 2011 World Table Tennis Championships women's doubles was the 50th edition of the women's doubles championship. Guo Yue and Li Xiaoxia won the title in 2009. They successfully defended their title by defeating Ding Ning and Guo Yan in the final 11–8, 11–5, 13–11, 11–8.

== Seeds ==
Matches will be best of 5 games in qualification matches and best of 7 games in the 64-player sized main draw.

1. (China) Guo Yue / (China) Li Xiaoxia (world champions)
2. (China) Ding Ning / (China) Guo Yan (final)
3. (South Korea) Kim Kyung-Ah / (South Korea) Park Mi-Young (semifinals)
4. (Hong Kong) Jiang Huajun / (Hong Kong) Tie Ya Na (semifinals)
5. (Japan) Ai Fukuhara / (Japan) Kasumi Ishikawa (third round)
6. (South Korea) Lee Eun-Hee / (South Korea) Park Young-Sook (third round, disqualified)
7. (Japan) Hiroko Fujii / (Japan) Misako Wakamiya (quarterfinals)
8. (Singapore) Li Jiawei / (Singapore) Sun Beibei (quarterfinals)
9. (Singapore) Feng Tianwei / (Singapore) Wang Yuegu (third round)
10. (China) Feng Yalan / (China) Mu Zi (quarterfinals)
11. (Japan) Yuka Ishigaki / (Japan) Yuri Yamanashi (third round)
12. (Chinese Taipei) Cheng I-ching / (Chinese Taipei) Huang Yi-hua (third round)
13. (North Korea) Kim Hye-Song / (North Korea) Kim Jong (quarterfinals)
14. (South Korea) Seok Ha-Jung / (South Korea) Yang Ha-Eun (second round)
15. (Romania) Daniela Dodean / (Romania) Elizabeta Samara (third round)
16. (Hungary) Georgina Póta / (Hungary) Krisztina Tóth (second round)
17. (Spain) Shen Yanfei / (Spain) Zhu Fang (second round)
18. (Netherlands) Li Jiao / (Netherlands) Li Jie (third round)
19. (Germany) Zhenqi Barthel / (Germany) Kristin Silbereisen (second round)
20. (Turkey) Sirin He / (Turkey) Melek Hu (second round)
21. (Czech Republic) Renata Strbikova / (Czech Republic) Iveta Vacenovska (second round)
22. (Germany) Sabine Winter / (Germany) Wu Jiaduo (second round)
23. (Hong Kong) Lee Ho Ching / (Hong Kong) Yu Kwok See (second round)
24. (Russia) Oxana Fadeeva / (Russia) Anna Tikhomirova (second round)
25. (Belarus) Alena Dubkova / (Belarus) Viktoria Pavlovich (second round)
26. (Spain) Galia Dvorak / (Spain) Sara Ramirez (third round)
27. (Serbia) Anamaria Erdelji / (Serbia) Gabriela Feher (first round)
28. (Russia) Polina Mikhaylova / (Russia) Yana Noskova (second round)
29. (Hong Kong) Guan Meng Yuan / (Hong Kong) Ng Wing Nam (second round)
30. (Belarus) Veronika Pavlovich / (Belarus) Alexandra Privalova (first round)
31. (Poland) Katarzyna Grzybowska / (Poland) Natalia Partyka (second round)
32. (Slovakia) Barbora Balazova / (Slovakia) Eva Ódorová (first round)

== Draw ==
=== Key ===
- Q = Qualifier
- w/o = Walkover
- w/d = Withdraw
- r = Retired
- DQ = Disqualified

=== Finals ===
Quarterfinals
1	(China) Guo Yue (China) Li Xiaoxia	7	5	11	11	8	11	11
10	(China) Feng Yalan (China) Mu Zi	11	11	8	6	11	6	7
13	(North Korea) Kim Hye-Song (North Korea) Kim Jong	8	9	9	7
3	(South Korea) Kim Kyung-Ah (South Korea) Park Mi-Young	11	11	11	11
4	(Hong Kong) Jiang Huajun (Hong Kong) Tie Ya Na	13	13	8	11	11
7	(Japan) Hiroko Fujii (Japan) Misako Wakamiya	11	11	11	8	7
8	(Singapore) Li Jiawei (Singapore) Sun Beibei	2	10	9	10
2	(China) Ding Ning (China) Guo Yan	11	12	11	12

Semifinals
1	(China) Guo Yue (China) Li Xiaoxia	12	11	11	13
3	(South Korea) Kim Kyung-Ah (South Korea) Park Mi-Young	10	4	6	11
4	(Hong Kong) Jiang Huajun (Hong Kong) Tie Ya Na	3	3	11	10
2	(China) Ding Ning (China) Guo Yan	11	11	13	12

Final
1	(China) Guo Yue (China) Li Xiaoxia	11	11	13	11
2	(China) Ding Ning (China) Guo Yan	8	5	11	8

=== Top half ===
==== Section 1 ====
First Round
1	(China) Guo Yue (China) Li X	11	12	11	11
Q	(India) S Kumaresan (India) M Patkar	6	10	2	7
Q	(Lithuania) I Juceviciute (Lithuania) E Stuckyte	5	7	3	7
24	(Russia) O Fadeeva (Russia) A Tikhomirova	11	11	11	11
20	(Turkey) S He (Turkey) M Hu	11	11	11	11
Q	(Colombia) D Castillo (Colombia) L Zuluaga	9	9	4	5
Q	(Bulgaria) K Gatinska (Bulgaria) S Remzi	7	4	3	3
11	(Japan) Y Ishigaki (Japan) Y Yamanashi	11	11	11	11
10	(China) Feng Y (China) Mu Z	11	11	11	11
Q	(Moldova) O Bliznet (Moldova) A Sandul	4	2	1	4
Q	(Malaysia) Beh L W (Malaysia) Chiu S J	3	3	2	7
19	(Germany) Z Barthel (Germany) K Silbereisen	11	11	11	11
31	(Poland) K Grzybowska (Poland) N Partyka	13	12	11	11
Q	(Ukraine) G Gaponova (Ukraine) I Motsyk	11	10	5	9
(Czech Republic) D Hadačová (Czech Republic) K Penkavova	7	7	11	8
6	(South Korea) Lee E-H (South Korea) Park Y-S	11	11	13	11

Second Round
1	(China) Guo Yue (China) Li X	11	11	11	11
24	(Russia) O Fadeeva (Russia) A Tikhomirova	8	5	7	9
20	(Turkey) S He (Turkey) M Hu	7	6	6	12	5
11	(Japan) Y Ishigaki (Japan) Y Yamanashi	11	11	11	10	11
10	(China) Feng Y (China) Mu Z	11	8	8	11	11	11
19	(Germany) Z Barthel (Germany) K Silbereisen	5	11	11	1	6	9
31	(Poland) K Grzybowska (Poland) N Partyka	9	11	7	10	5
6	(South Korea) Lee E-H (South Korea) Park Y-S	11	5	11	12	11

Third Round
1	(China) Guo Yue (China) Li X	11	11	11	11
11	(Japan) Y Ishigaki (Japan) Y Yamanashi	8	5	4	7
10	(China) Feng Y (China) Mu Z
6	(South Korea) Lee E-H (South Korea) Park Y-S	DQ

Quarterfinals
1	(China) Guo Yue (China) Li X	7	5	11	11	8	11	11
10	(China) Feng Y (China) Mu Z	11	11	8	6	11	6	7

==== Section 2 ====
First Round
5	(Japan) A Fukuhara (Japan) K Ishikawa	11	11	11	11
(England) J Parker (England) K Sibley	5	8	7	5
(Russia) Y Prokhorova (Russia) A Voronova	11	6	11	11	11
30	(Belarus) Ve Pavlovich (Belarus) A Privalova	4	11	8	9	7
32	(Slovakia) B Balazova (Slovakia) E Ódorová	11	8	11	9	6	12
(Republic of the Congo) X Han (Republic of the Congo) F Yang	5	11	8	11	11	14
(Slovenia) M Safran (Slovenia) J Tomazini	9	5	6	7
13	(North Korea) Kim H-S (North Korea) Kim J	11	11	11	11
12	(Chinese Taipei) Cheng I-C (Chinese Taipei) Huang Y-H	11	11	11	11
Q	(Colombia) J Araque (Colombia) P Medina	7	2	8	2
Q	(Netherlands) S Dieker (Netherlands) Y Timna	9	6	9	12
28	(Russia) P Mikhaylova (Russia) Y Noskova	11	11	11	14
21	(Czech Republic) R Strbikova (Czech Republic) I Vacenovska	9	11	11	11	6	11
(Croatia) C Molnar (Croatia) Y Tian	11	0	0	8	11	7
(Australia) J F Lay (Australia) Z V Tan
3	(South Korea) Kim K-A (South Korea) Park M-Y	w/o

Second Round
5	(Japan) A Fukuhara (Japan) K Ishikawa	9	11	11	11	11
(Russia) Y Prokhorova (Russia) A Voronova	11	5	9	8	9
(Republic of the Congo) X Han (Republic of the Congo) F Yang	10	4	4	7
13	(North Korea) Kim H-S (North Korea) Kim J	12	11	11	11
12	(Chinese Taipei) Cheng I-C (Chinese Taipei) Huang Y-H	11	11	11	11
28	(Russia) P Mikhaylova (Russia) Y Noskova	9	6	4	7
21	(Czech Republic) R Strbikova (Czech Republic) I Vacenovska	7	8	3	6
3	(South Korea) Kim K-A (South Korea) Park M-Y	11	11	11	11

Third Round
5	(Japan) A Fukuhara (Japan) K Ishikawa	9	10	11	11	10	4
13	(North Korea) Kim H-S (North Korea) Kim J	11	12	9	8	12	11
12	(Chinese Taipei) Cheng I-C (Chinese Taipei) Huang Y-H	2	9	8	9
3	(South Korea) Kim K-A (South Korea) Park M-Y	11	11	11	11

Quarterfinals
13	(North Korea) Kim H-S (North Korea) Kim J	8	9	9	7
3	(South Korea) Kim K-A (South Korea) Park M-Y	11	11	11	11

=== Bottom half ===
==== Section 3 ====
First Round
4	(Hong Kong) Jiang H J (Hong Kong) Tie Y N	11	11	11	11
Q	(Greece) M Christoforaki (Greece) F Exarchou	5	4	3	9
(United States) A Hsing (United States) L Zhang	11	1	5	3	6
22	(Germany) S Winter (Germany) J Wu	9	11	11	11	11
25	(Belarus) A Dubkova (Belarus) Vi Pavlovich	15	11	5	11	12
(Sweden) M Ekholm (Sweden) M Pettersson	13	9	11	7	10
Q	(India) M Das (India) P Ghatak	3	5	2	1
9	(Singapore) Feng T (Singapore) Wang Y	11	11	11	11
16	(Hungary) G Póta (Hungary) K Tóth	11	11	11	9	11	12
Q	(Chinese Taipei) Chang Y-C (Chinese Taipei) Chen S-Y	6	13	5	11	5	10
Q	(Singapore) Li I S (Singapore) Sim K X Z	2	8	11	11	11	5
26	(Spain) G Dvorak (Spain) S Ramirez	11	11	5	13	5	11
29	(Hong Kong) Guan M Y (Hong Kong) Ng W N	11	11	11	11
Q	(Chile) B Rodriguez (Chile) P Vega	8	7	6	7
Q	(Portugal) A Neves (Portugal) L Oliveira	6	11	1	5	7
7	(Japan) H Fujii (Japan) M Wakamiya	11	6	11	11	11

Second Round
4	(Hong Kong) Jiang H J (Hong Kong) Tie Y N	11	10	11	8	11	11
22	(Germany) S Winter (Germany) J Wu	4	12	8	11	2	3
25	(Belarus) A Dubkova (Belarus) Vi Pavlovich	8	11	5	9	11	6
9	(Singapore) Feng T (Singapore) Wang Y	11	9	11	11	8	11
16	(Hungary) G Póta (Hungary) K Tóth	11	10	10	6	5
26	(Spain) G Dvorak (Spain) S Ramirez	7	12	12	11	11
29	(Hong Kong) Guan M Y (Hong Kong) Ng W N	8	5	11	8	6
7	(Japan) H Fujii (Japan) M Wakamiya	11	11	8	11	11

Third Round
4	(Hong Kong) Jiang H J (Hong Kong) Tie Y N	11	11	11	11
9	(Singapore) Feng T (Singapore) Wang Y	6	7	8	9
26	(Spain) G Dvorak (Spain) S Ramirez	6	4	6	7
7	(Japan) H Fujii (Japan) M Wakamiya	11	11	11	11

Quarterfinals
4	(Hong Kong) Jiang H (Hong Kong) Tie Y N	13	13	8	11	11
7	(Japan) H Fujii (Japan) M Wakamiya	11	11	11	8	7

==== Section 4 ====
First Round
8	(Singapore) Li Jiawei (Singapore) Sun B	11	11	11	11
Q	(Estonia) K Lindmae (Estonia) T Tsistjakova	6	9	6	4
(Thailand) N Komwong (Thailand) A Muangsuk	12	9	5	9	7
17	(Spain) Y Shen (Spain) F Zhu	10	11	11	11	11
27	(Serbia) A Erdelji (Serbia) G Feher	9	9	11	7	2
(Luxembourg) S De Nutte (Luxembourg) X L Ni	11	11	9	11	11
(Poland) K Stefanska (Poland) A Szymanska	2	8	2	5
15	(Romania) D Dodean (Romania) E Samara	11	11	11	11
14	(South Korea) Seok H-J (South Korea) Yang H-E	11	11	11	11
(Dominican Republic) J Valdez (Dominican Republic) X Wu	1	8	9	9
(France) A Dessaint (France) C Grundisch	9	11	4	8	4
18	(Netherlands) Jiao Li (Netherlands) Jie Li	11	9	11	11	11
23	(Hong Kong) Lee H C (Hong Kong) Yu K S	11	4	5	11	12	11
(Romania) C Postoaca (Romania) B Szocs	9	11	11	4	10	6
(Netherlands) L Creemers (Netherlands) B Eerland	5	6	4	8
2	(China) Ding N (China) Guo Yan	11	11	11	11

Second Round
8	(Singapore) Li Jiawei (Singapore) Sun B	11	11	11	11
17	(Spain) Y Shen (Spain) F Zhu	6	6	9	6
(Luxembourg) S De Nutte (Luxembourg) X L Ni	2	13	8	10	11	6
15	(Romania) D Dodean (Romania) E Samara	11	11	11	12	5	11
14	(South Korea) Seok H-J (South Korea) Yang H-E	11	9	11	8	11	8	8
18	(Netherlands) Jiao Li (Netherlands) Jie Li	7	11	8	11	1	11	11
23	(Hong Kong) Lee H C (Hong Kong) Yu K S	3	9	7	9
2	(China) Ding N (China) Guo Yan	11	11	11	11

Third Round
8	(Singapore) Li Jiawei (Singapore) Sun B	13	10	12	11	11	11
15	(Romania) D Dodean (Romania) E Samara	15	12	10	8	6	8
18	(Netherlands) Jiao Li (Netherlands) Jie Li	2	2	3	11	6
2	(China) Ding N (China) Guo Yan	11	11	11	8	11

Quarterfinals
8	(Singapore) Li Jiawei (Singapore) Sun B	2	10	9	10
2	(China) Ding N (China) Guo Yan	11	12	11	12

== See also ==
List of World Table Tennis Championships medalists
