= 2004 World Junior Table Tennis Championships =

Table tennis tournament in Japan

Tournament details
- Dates: 28 November – 5 December 2004
- Edition: 2nd
- Location: Kobe, Japan

The 2004 World Junior Table Tennis Championships were held in Kobe, Japan, from 28 November to 5 December 2004. It was organised by the Japan Table Tennis Association under the auspices and authority of the International Table Tennis Federation (ITTF).

== Medal summary ==
=== Events ===
Event	Gold	Silver	Bronze
Boys' singles	China; Ma Long	South Korea; Cho Eon-rae	China; Lin Chen
Boys' singles	China; Ma Long	South Korea; Cho Eon-rae	Chinese Taipei; Wu Chih-chi
Girls' singles	China; Chang Chenchen	China; Liu Shiwen	China; Fan Ying
Girls' singles	China; Chang Chenchen	China; Liu Shiwen	Japan; Ai Fukuhara
Boys' doubles	Japan; Seiya Kishikawa; Jun Mizutani	China; Ma Long; Zhou Bin	Croatia; Andrej Gaćina; Tomislav Zubčić
Boys' doubles	Japan; Seiya Kishikawa; Jun Mizutani	China; Ma Long; Zhou Bin	South Korea; Cho Eon-rae; Lee Jin-kwon
Girls' doubles	China; Chang Chenchen; Liu Shiwen	China; Fan Ying; Wang Xuan	Romania; Daniela Dodean; Elizabeta Samara
Girls' doubles	China; Chang Chenchen; Liu Shiwen	China; Fan Ying; Wang Xuan	South Korea; Jee Min-hyung; Shim Se-rom
Mixed doubles	China; Zhou Bin; Liu Shiwen	China; Ma Long; Chang Chenchen	Japan; Seiya Kishikawa; Ai Fukuhara
Mixed doubles	China; Zhou Bin; Liu Shiwen	China; Ma Long; Chang Chenchen	South Korea; Cho Eon-rae; Shim Se-rom
Boys' team	China; Ma Long; Zhou Bin; Li Hu; Lin Chen	South Korea; Lee Jinkwon; Cho Eon-rae; Yeo Inho; Kim Jungkyu	Japan; Jun Mizutani; Seiya Kishikawa; Taku Takakiwa
Girls' team	China; Chang Chenchen; Fan Ying; Liu Shiwen; Wang Xuan	Japan; Ai Fukuhara; Yuka Ishigaki; Nozomi Hasama; Shiho Ono	Romania; Elizabeta Samara; Daniela Dodean; Iulia Necula; Andreea Mamaliga

=== Medal table ===
* Host nation (Japan)

Rank	Nation	Gold	Silver	Bronze	Total
1	China	6	4	2	12
2	Japan*	1	1	3	5
3	South Korea	0	2	3	5
4	Romania	0	0	2	2
5	Chinese Taipei	0	0	1	1
5	Croatia	0	0	1	1
Totals (6 entries)		7	7	12	26

== See also ==
- 2004 World Team Table Tennis Championships
