= 2009 World Table Tennis Championships =

- Date: April 28–May 5
- Edition: 50th
- Location: Yokohama, Japan
- Venue: Yokohama Arena

Champions

Men's singles
- (China) Wang Hao

Women's singles
- (China) Zhang Yining

Men's doubles
- (China) Chen Qi / (China) Wang Hao

Women's doubles
- (China) Guo Yue / (China) Li Xiaoxia

Mixed doubles
- (China) Li Ping / (China) Cao Zhen
- World Table Tennis Championships

The 2009 H.I.S. World Table Tennis Championships were held in Yokohama, Japan, from 28 April to 5 May 2009. The Chinese team dominated the competition, following their sweep of the gold medals in table tennis at the 2008 Summer Olympics. It was the tenth (and third consecutive) world table tennis championships at which China won all five available titles.

Fourth-ranked Timo Boll of Germany, a challenger for the men's singles title, was forced to withdraw from the tournament due to a back injury. After Boll's withdrawal, players from China held the top four seedings in both the men's and women's singles competitions.

The event took place during the 2009 swine flu pandemic, with the participants being affected by this. When a case of the strain was found in the body of a seventeen-year-old schoolboy in Yokohama, where the championships were taking place, the event's organisers implemented new measures to stop the flu spreading. Thermographic exam cameras were installed at the player entrances of Yokohama Arena, with the intention of sending anyone with unusually high body temperatures for medical assistance. The players were told to scrub their hands well for hygiene reasons and to avail of face masks and hand gels which had previously been used during outbreaks of severe acute respiratory syndrome and avian influenza. Participants from Mexico, the most severely affected country taking part in the championships, were placed in quarantine and given thermometers to check their temperature regularly.

China collected seventeen of the available twenty medals at the championships, to follow their four golds at the 2008 Summer Olympics in Beijing. After the championships had ended, the country's deputy sports minister, Cai Zhenhua questioned whether China's dominance in the sport would have a negative effect on its development. He said: "From the point of view of the Chinese association, the coaches and the players, it is a great achievement. But personally I am anxious that it is dangerous for the development of this sport worldwide. The truth is we have failed again. Chinese players grabbing all titles in whatever tournament they participate in is definitely detrimental". He advocated issuing invitations to non-Chinese nationals to train in the country and suggested Chinese coaches could be sent to other countries as "up to 70 percent of Chinese knowledge and tactics could be shared with others".

== Medal summary ==
=== Medal table ===
Rank	Nation	Gold	Silver	Bronze	Total
1	China (CHN)	5	5	7	17
2	Hong Kong (HKG)	0	0	1	1
2	Japan (JPN)	0	0	1	1
2	South Korea (KOR)	0	0	1	1
Totals (4 entries)		5	5	10	20

=== Events ===
Event	Gold	Silver	Bronze
Men's singles	(China) Wang Hao	(China) Wang Liqin	(China) Ma Long
Men's singles	(China) Wang Hao	(China) Wang Liqin	(China) Ma Lin
Women's singles	(China) Zhang Yining	(China) Guo Yue	(China) Liu Shiwen
Women's singles	(China) Zhang Yining	(China) Guo Yue	(China) Li Xiaoxia
Men's doubles	(China) Chen Qi; Wang Hao	(China) Ma Long; Xu Xin	(China) Hao Shuai; Zhang Jike
Men's doubles	(China) Chen Qi; Wang Hao	(China) Ma Long; Xu Xin	(Japan) Seiya Kishikawa; Jun Mizutani
Women's doubles	(China) Guo Yue; Li Xiaoxia	(China) Ding Ning; Guo Yan	(Hong Kong) Jiang Huajun; Tie Ya Na
Women's doubles	(China) Guo Yue; Li Xiaoxia	(China) Ding Ning; Guo Yan	(South Korea) Kim Kyung-ah; Park Mi-young
Mixed doubles	(China) Li Ping; Cao Zhen	(China) Zhang Jike; Mu Zi	(China) Zhang Chao; Yao Yan
Mixed doubles	(China) Li Ping; Cao Zhen	(China) Zhang Jike; Mu Zi	(China) Hao Shuai; Chang Chenchen

== Venue ==
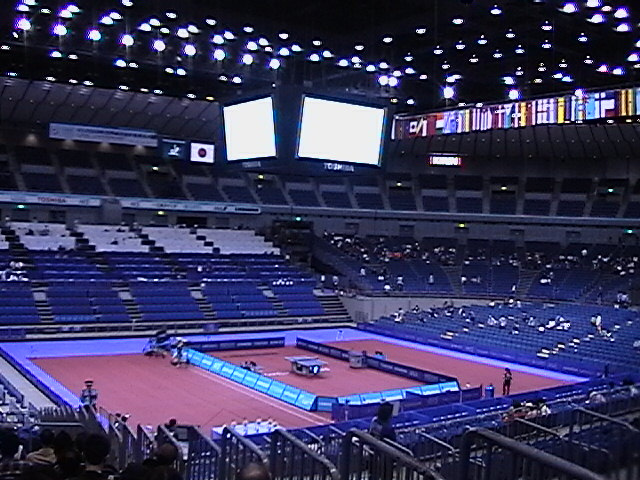
WTTC Center courts

- Yokohama Arena

== Champions ==
All five finals featured Chinese players only.

=== Men's singles ===
(China) Wang Hao

World number one Wang Hao beat Wang Liqin in the men's singles final, China's third consecutive men's singles title and fifteenth world championship title in that section.

=== Women's singles ===
(China) Zhang Yining

Olympic gold medallist Zhang Yining beat her fellow countrywoman, Liu Shiwen, to win one of the women's singles semi-finals, whilst Guo Yue, the defending champion, beat Li Xiaoxia in the other semi-final. Zhang went on to beat Guo in the final, securing China's eighteenth women's singles title.

=== Men's doubles ===
(China) Chen Qi / (China) Wang Hao

In the semi-finals of the men's doubles, Ma Long and Xu Xin beat Jun Mizutani and Seiya Kishikawa of Japan to play Chen Qi and men's singles winner, Hao, in the final match. Chen and Hao won the title.

=== Women's doubles ===
(China) Guo Yue / (China) Li Xiaoxia

In the semi-finals of the women's doubles, Guo and Li beat Jiang Huajun and Tie Yana of Hong Kong and Ding Ning and Guo Yan won against South Korea's Kim Kyung-Ah and Park Mi-Young.

=== Mixed doubles ===
(China) Li Ping / (China) Cao Zhen

The mixed doubles was won by Li Ping and Cao Zhen.
