= 2011 World Table Tennis Championships =

Table tennis tournament

- Date: May 8–15
- Edition: 51st
- Location: Rotterdam, Netherlands
- Venue: Rotterdam Ahoy

Champions

Men's singles
- (China) Zhang Jike

Women's singles
- (China) Ding Ning

Men's doubles
- (China) Ma Long / (China) Xu Xin

Women's doubles
- (China) Guo Yue / (China) Li Xiaoxia

Mixed doubles
- (China) Zhang Chao / (China) Cao Zhen
- World Table Tennis Championships

The GAC GROUP 2011 World Table Tennis Championships was held at the Ahoy indoor sporting arena in Rotterdam, Netherlands from May 8 to May 15, 2011. This decision was announced in February 2008. It was the 51st edition contested. The tournament was organised by the ITTF and The Netherlands Table Tennis Association (NTTB). GAC GROUP was the title sponsor of the Championships.

== Events and schedule ==
Five individual events were contested at the Championships. Qualification rounds were held from May 8 to 9.

Rounds in main draw
Finals

Date	May 8	May 9	May 10	May 11	May 12	May 13	May 14	May 15
Men's singles			1R	2R, 3R	3R, 4R	4R	QF	SF, F
Women's singles			1R	2R, 3R	4R	QF, SF	F	
Men's doubles			1R, 2R	3R	QF		SF, F	
Women's doubles			1R, 2R		3R	QF	SF	F
Mixed doubles		1R	2R, 3R	4R	QF, SF	F		

== Medal summary ==
=== Medal table ===
Rank	Nation	Gold	Silver	Bronze	Total
1	China (CHN)	5	5	4	14
2	Hong Kong (HKG)	0	0	2	2
2	South Korea (KOR)	0	0	2	2
4	Germany (GER)	0	0	1	1
4	Japan (JPN)	0	0	1	1
Totals (5 entries)		5	5	10	20

=== Events ===
Event	Gold	Silver	Bronze
Men's singles	(China) Zhang Jike	(China) Wang Hao	(Germany) Timo Boll
Men's singles	(China) Zhang Jike	(China) Wang Hao	(China) Ma Long
Women's singles	(China) Ding Ning	(China) Li Xiaoxia	(China) Liu Shiwen
Women's singles	(China) Ding Ning	(China) Li Xiaoxia	(China) Guo Yue
Men's doubles	(China) Ma Long (China) Xu Xin	(China) Chen Qi (China) Ma Lin	(South Korea) Jung Young-sik (South Korea) Kim Min-seok
Men's doubles	(China) Ma Long (China) Xu Xin	(China) Chen Qi (China) Ma Lin	(China) Wang Hao (China) Zhang Jike
Women's doubles	(China) Guo Yue (China) Li Xiaoxia	(China) Ding Ning (China) Guo Yan	(South Korea) Kim Kyung-ah (South Korea) Park Mi-young
Women's doubles	(China) Guo Yue (China) Li Xiaoxia	(China) Ding Ning (China) Guo Yan	(Hong Kong) Jiang Huajun (Hong Kong) Tie Ya Na
Mixed doubles	(China) Zhang Chao (China) Cao Zhen	(China) Hao Shuai (China) Mu Zi	(Hong Kong) Cheung Yuk (Hong Kong) Jiang Huajun
Mixed doubles	(China) Zhang Chao (China) Cao Zhen	(China) Hao Shuai (China) Mu Zi	(Japan) Seiya Kishikawa (Japan) Ai Fukuhara

== Champions ==
=== Men's singles ===
(China) Zhang Jike def. (China) Wang Hao, 12–10, 11–7, 6–11, 9–11, 11–5, 14–12.

=== Women's singles ===
(China) Ding Ning def. (China) Li Xiaoxia, 12–10, 13–11, 11–9, 8–11, 8–11, 11–7.

=== Men's doubles ===
(China) Ma Long / (China) Xu Xin def. (China) Chen Qi / (China) Ma Lin, 11–3, 11–8, 4–11, 11–4, 11–7.

=== Women's doubles ===
(China) Guo Yue / (China) Li Xiaoxia def. (China) Ding Ning / (China) Guo Yan, 11–8, 11–5, 13–11, 11–8.

=== Mixed doubles ===
(China) Zhang Chao / (China) Cao Zhen def. (China) Hao Shuai / (China) Mu Zi, 11–7, 11–7, 11–9, 9–11, 11–8.
