= Yao Yan (table tennis) =

Chinese table tennis player

Personal information
- Nationality: China
- Born: 22 August 1988 (age 37)
Medal record
Representing China
World Table Tennis Championships
| Bronze medal – third place | 2009 | Mixed Doubles |

Yao Yan (Chinese: 姚彦, born 22 August 1988) is a female Chinese international table tennis player.

She won the bronze medal at the 2009 World Table Tennis Championships – Mixed Doubles with Zhang Chao.

Yao Yan is married to table tennis player Xu Xin.

== See also ==
- List of table tennis players
