= Zhang Chao (table tennis) =

Chinese table tennis player

Personal information
- Nationality: China
- Born: 5 January 1985 (age 41)
Medal record
Representing China
World Table Tennis Championships
Bronze medal – third place	2009	Mixed Doubles
Gold medal – first place	2011	Mixed Doubles

Zhang Chao (born 5 January 1985) is a male Chinese international table tennis player.

He won the gold medal at the 2011 World Table Tennis Championships – Mixed Doubles with Cao Zhen and the bronze medal at the 2009 World Table Tennis Championships – Mixed Doubles with Yao Yan.

== See also ==
- List of table tennis players
- List of World Table Tennis Championships medalists
