= Li Ping (table tennis) =

Chinese-Qatari table tennis player

Personal information
- Nationality: Chinese (before 2015); Qatari (after 2015)
- Born: 18 May 1986 (age 40) Tianjin, China
- Height: 175 cm (5 ft 9 in)
- Weight: 63 kg (139 lb)

Sport
- Sport: Table tennis
- Club: Ryukyu Asteeda
- Playing style: Right-handed shakehand grip
- Highest ranking: 26 (June 2016)
Medal record
Men's table tennis
Representing China
World Championships
Gold medal – first place	2009 Yokohama	Mixed Doubles
Representing Qatar
Islamic Solidarity Games
Bronze medal – third place	2017 Baku	Single

Li Ping
- Chinese: 李平
Transcriptions
Standard Mandarin
- Hanyu Pinyin: Lǐ Píng

Li Ping (Chinese: 李平, born 18 May 1986) is a Chinese-Qatari table tennis player. With Cao Zhen, he won the gold medal in the mixed doubles event of the 2009 World Table Tennis Championships, representing China.

He represented Qatar at the 2016 Summer Olympics, losing 3:4 to Dimitrij Ovtcharov in the third round. He also won the ITTF World Tour Belarus Open in 2015.
