= Guo Yue (table tennis) =

Chinese table tennis player

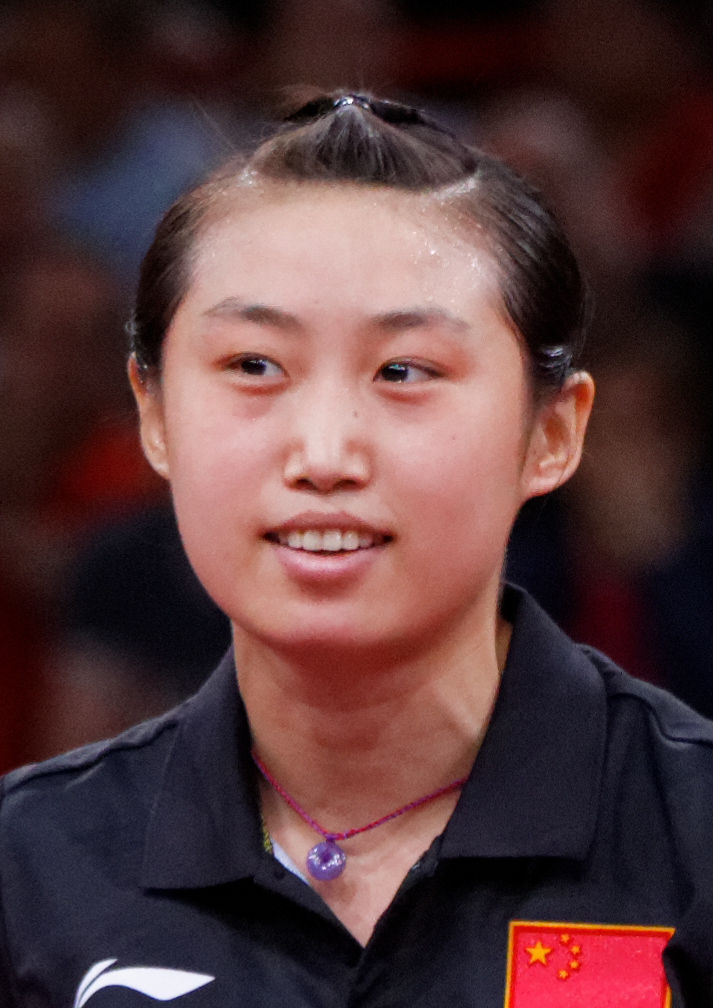

Personal information
- Native name: 郭跃
- Full name: Guo Yue
- Nationality: Chinese
- Born: 17 July 1988 (age 38) Anshan, Liaoning
- Height: 1.61 m (5 ft 3 in)
- Weight: 48 kg (106 lb; 7.6 st)

Sport
- Sport: Table tennis
- Playing style: left-handed, Shake hands grip
- Highest ranking: 1 (January 2008)
Medal record
Women's table tennis
Representing China
Olympic Games
Gold medal – first place	2008 Beijing	Team
Gold medal – first place	2012 London	Team
Bronze medal – third place	2004 Athens	Doubles
Bronze medal – third place	2008 Beijing	Singles
World Championships
Gold medal – first place	2004 Doha	Team
Gold medal – first place	2005 Shanghai	Mixed Doubles
Gold medal – first place	2006 Bremen	Team
Gold medal – first place	2007 Zagreb	Singles
Gold medal – first place	2007 Zagreb	Mixed Doubles
Gold medal – first place	2008 Guangzhou	Team
Gold medal – first place	2009 Yokohama	Doubles
Gold medal – first place	2011 Rotterdam	Doubles
Gold medal – first place	2012 Dortmund	Team
Gold medal – first place	2013 Paris	Doubles
Silver medal – second place	2003 Paris	Doubles
Silver medal – second place	2005 Shanghai	Doubles
Silver medal – second place	2007 Zagreb	Doubles
Silver medal – second place	2009 Yokohama	Singles
Silver medal – second place	2010 Moscow	Team
Bronze medal – third place	2005 Shanghai	Singles
Bronze medal – third place	2011 Rotterdam	Singles

Guo Yue (simplified Chinese: 郭跃; traditional Chinese: 郭躍; pinyin: Guō Yuè; born July 17, 1988, in Anshan, Liaoning) is a Chinese table tennis player and the 2007 women's world champion.

Controversy ensued in China when Guo Yue was kicked out of the National Table Tennis Team in 2015 for "poor behaviour" and lack of interest. As of 2015, she had left the table tennis field and was studying finance at Tsinghua University.

== Career ==
She was a left-handed shakehand attack player and came from Liaoning, China, the province where Wang Nan, Chang Chenchen and Li Jia (all left-handed players) came from. She was the potential leading player in Chinese woman team. Her original partner in women's doubles was Niu Jianfeng, who came from Hebei. Her new partner was Li Xiaoxia, who was also her roommate.

Guo experienced series of losses in international games which led to her disappearance from the public eye for almost half a year. It is officially claimed "To help her mentally adjust". At the 2006 Asian Games in Doha, Guo returned to competition and took first place in women's singles, women's doubles and women's team. In 2007 from January to July, Guo attended six international opens and won four gold medals. At the selection match for 2007 World Table Tennis Championships in Zagreb, Guo qualified early on.

Guo Yue won the 2007 World Championships in Zagreb, Croatia, by defeating her compatriot Li Xiaoxia in the women's singles final. She also won the mixed doubles title with Wang Liqin.

== Controversy ==
Rumours were rife in 2010 when Guo Yue was cited for "poor behaviour" and lack of interest in playing table tennis. An incident, cited on Chinese forum Tianya, stated that she was once tasked to attend a meeting and failed to do so, hence causing friction with China's top player Wang Nan. After the London 2012 Olympics, she was switched to a provincial team. In 2015, she was officially kicked out from the National Team and has gone on to study finance at Tsinghua University.

== Achievements ==
- 1999 – Japan East Asian Junior Championship Women's Singles Champion
- 2000 – Asian Cup Women's Singles Runner-up
- 2002 – International Table Tennis Federation, ITTF Pro Tour Grand Finals Women's Singles Runner-up
- 2003 – Asian Championship Women's Team Champion, Women's Singles Second Runner-up, Runner-up of Women's Doubles at the 47 World Table Tennis Championship
- 2004 – Women's Doubles Bronze at the Athens Olympic, Women's Team Champion of World Table Tennis Championship, ITTF Pro Tour Events Final Women's Singles Champion and Women's Doubles Runner-up
- 2005 – Mixed Doubles (with Wang Liqin) at the 48th World Table Tennis Championship, bronze medal in Women's Singles
- 2006 – World Table Tennis Championship Women's Team Champion; Champion of Team, Women's Singles, Women's Doubles Champion (with Li Xiaoxia) at Asian Games
- 2007 – World Table Tennis Championship Women's singles Champion, Mixed Doubles Champion (with Wang Liqin)
- 2008 – World Table Tennis Championship Women's Team Champion; Asian Cup Champion; Women's Singles Bronze at the Beijing Olympic

== See also ==
- China at the 2012 Summer Olympics#Table tennis
- Table tennis at the 2012 Summer Olympics – Women's singles
- Table tennis at the 2012 Summer Olympics – Women's team
