= Mu Zi =

Chinese table tennis player

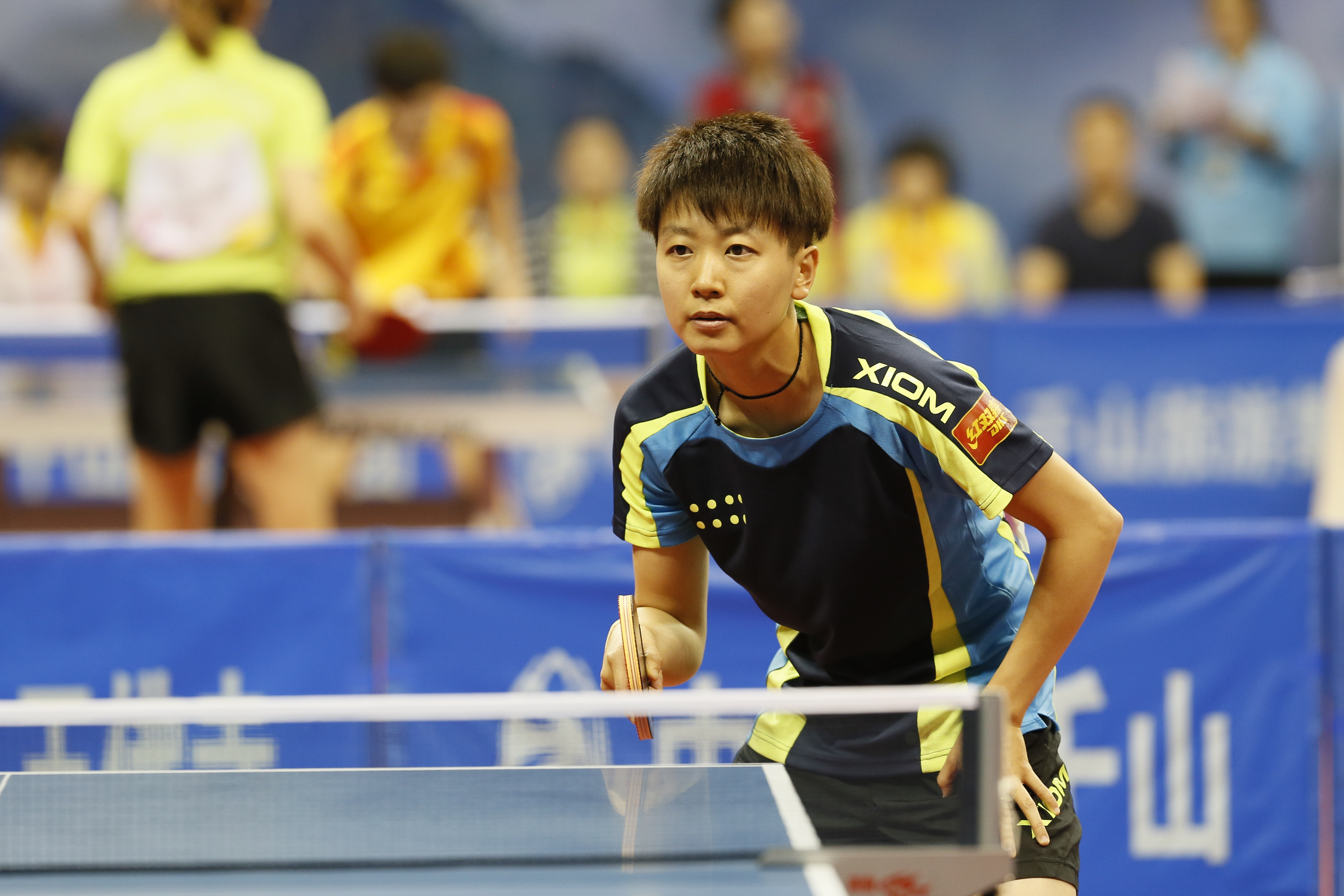

Personal information
- Native name: 木子
- Nationality: Chinese
- Born: 9 January 1989 (age 37) Liaoning

Sport
- Sport: Table tennis
- Playing style: Right-handed, shakehand grip
- Highest ranking: 14 (December 2015)
- Current ranking: 14 (December 2015)
Medal record
Women's table tennis
Representing China
World Championships
Silver medal – second place	2009 Yokohama	Mixed Doubles
Silver medal – second place	2011 Rotterdam	Mixed Doubles
Bronze medal – third place	2015 Suzhou	Singles

Mu Zi (Chinese: 木子; pinyin: Mù Zǐ; born 9 January 1989) is a Chinese female table tennis player. She is a two-time finalist in mixed doubles event at the World Championships. In 2015, she reached the semifinal of her first women's singles event at the World Championships and in 2019 she won with Chen Ke the Hong Kong Open Women's Doubles.
