= Suzhou International Expo Center =

- 苏州国际博览中心
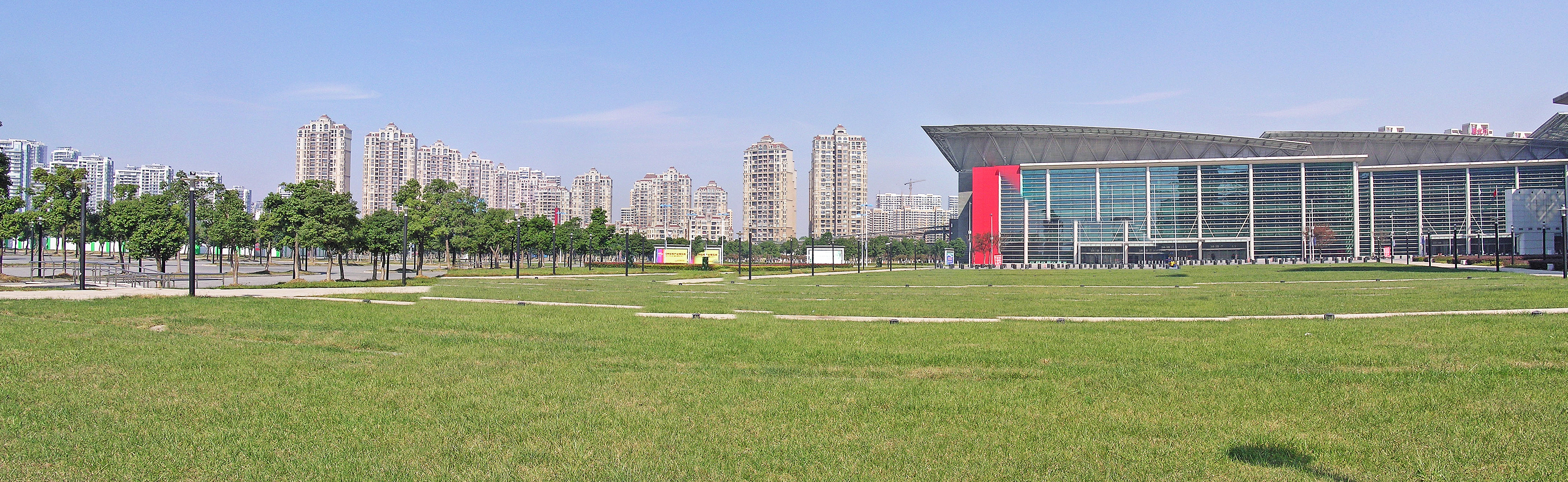
- Suzhou International Expo Center
- Interactive map of the Suzhou International Expo Center area

General information
- Construction started: September 27, 2003
- Completed: September 30, 2004 (first stage)

Height
- Height: 22.5 m

Technical details
- Floor count: 2
- Floor area: 186,000 m^{2} (first stage)

Design and construction
- Architecture firm: Skidmore, Owings & Merrill, Suzhou Institute of Architectural Design
- Main contractor: Shanghai Bao Metallurgical Construction Co., Ltd.

Suzhou International Expo Center (Chinese: 苏州国际博览中心; pinyin: Sūzhōu guójì bólǎn zhōngxīn), located to the east of Jinji Lake in Suzhou Industrial Park, Suzhou, Jiangsu, is a convention center in China. It occupies an area of 188,600 m^{2}, and its total gross floor area is 255,000 square meters. It is said to have the world's largest uninterrupted exhibition space, according to Xinhua News Agency.
