= Maria Dolgikh =

Russian table tennis player

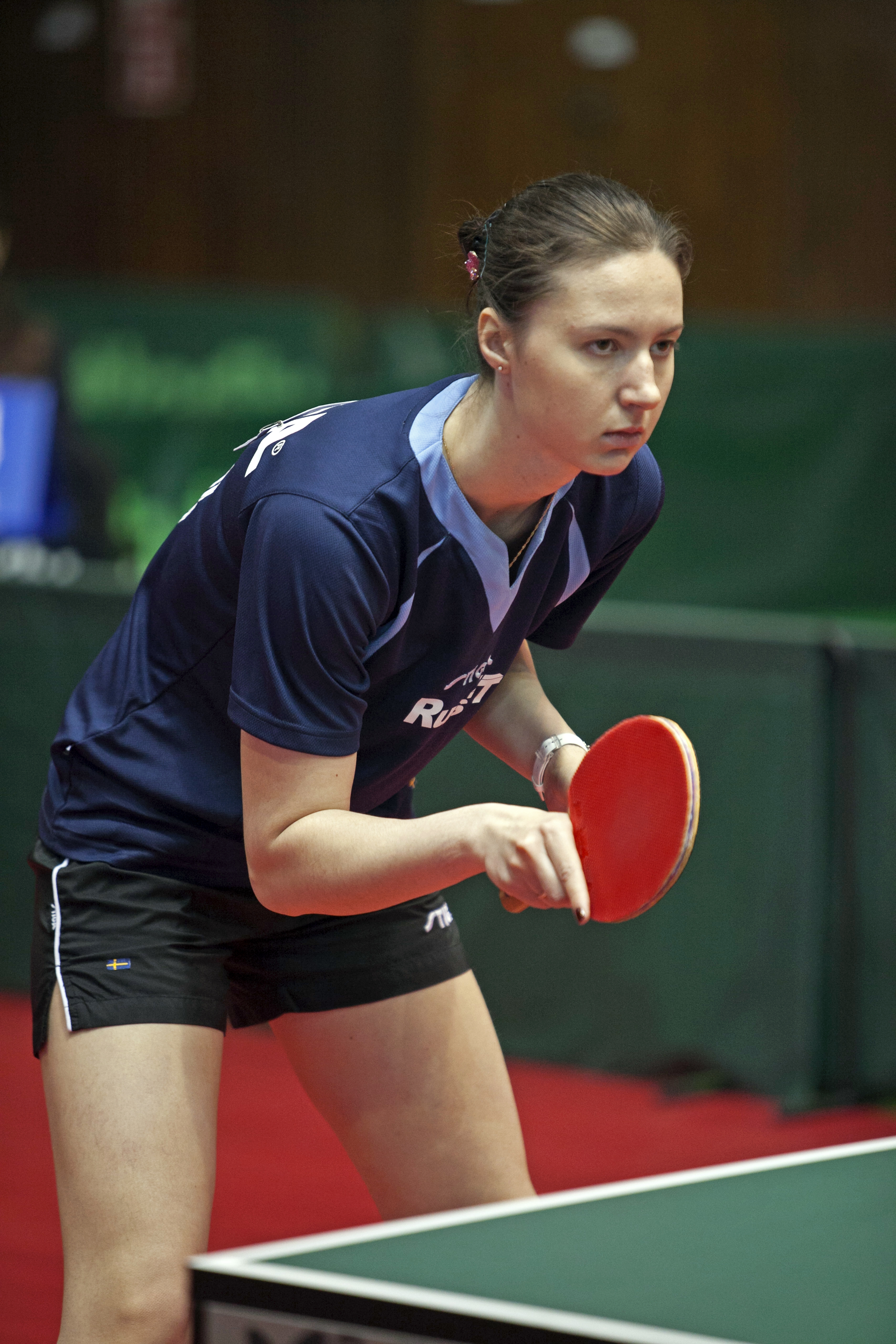
Maria Dolgikh

Maria Dolgikh (born July 24, 1987) is a Russian table tennis player. She competed at the 2016 Summer Olympics in the women's singles event, in which she was eliminated in the first round by Jian Fang Lay.
