= Anelia Karova =

Bulgarian table tennis player

Personal information
- Nationality: Bulgaria
- Born: 29 September 1989 (age 36) Bulgaria

Sport
- Sport: Table tennis

Anelia Karova (first name also sometimes transliterated as Aneliya) (Bulgarian: Анелия Карова) (born 29 September 1989) is a female table tennis player from Bulgaria.

== Biography ==
Karova is the Bulgarian women champion for the year 2014 (2013/2014 table tennis season) and finished in second place in 2015. She has also posted a second-place finish at an U21 Balkaniad. She represented Bulgaria at the 2015 European Games and also took part in the 2015 Asarel Bulgaria tournament that was held in Panagyurishte. Karova has played for "Comfort" (Varna).
