= Park Mi-young =

South Korean table tennis player

Personal information
- Nationality: South Korea
- Born: 17 November 1981 (age 44) Daegu, Republic of Korea
- Height: 1.61 m (5 ft 3 in)
- Weight: 55 kg (121 lb; 8.7 st)

Sport
- Sport: Table tennis
- Playing style: Right-handed, shakehand grip
- Highest ranking: 8 (February, 2010)
Medal record
Women's table tennis
Representing South Korea
Olympic Games
Bronze medal – third place	2008 Beijing	Team
World Championships
Bronze medal – third place	2007 Zagreb	Doubles
Bronze medal – third place	2009 Yokohama	Doubles
Bronze medal – third place	2011 Rotterdam	Doubles
Bronze medal – third place	2012 Dortmund	Team

Park Mi-Young (Korean pronunciation: [pak̚ mi.jʌŋ] or [paŋ.mi.jʌŋ]; born November 17, 1981, in Daegu, Republic of Korea) is a South Korean table tennis player. She was part of the table tennis team that won a bronze medal in the 2008 Summer Olympics. Park currently plays for the Samsung Life Insurance Table Tennis team and is ranked 24th in the world as of October 2011. She qualified directly for the 2012 Summer Olympics in May 2011. At the 2012 Summer Olympics, she reached the last 16 in the women's individual, and placed fourth with the South Korean women's team.

== Career records ==
Singles (as of February 24, 2015)

- Olympics: round of 16 (2008, 2012).
- World Championships: round of 16 (2009).
- World Cup appearances: 2. Record: 5-8th (2009, 10).
- Pro Tour winner (2): Chile Open 2006; Japan Open 2009. Runner-up (1): Polish Open 2009.
- Pro Tour Grand Finals appearances: 3. Record: QF (2009).
- Asian Cup: 7th (2006).

Women's doubles

- World Championships: SF (2007, 09, 11).
- Pro Tour winner (6): Swedish Open 2007; Brazil Open 2008; Korea, English Open 2009; Korea Open 2010, Spanish Open 2012. Runner-up (5): Brazil Open 2005; Japan, German Open 2007; Qatar Open 2008; Qatar Open 2010, Korea Open 2011.
- Pro Tour Grand Finals appearances: 5. Record: runner-up (2007, 08).
- Asian Games: QF (2006).
- Asian Championships: runner-up (2009).

Mixed doubles

- World Championships: QF (2007).

Team

- Olympics: 3rd (2008).
- World Championships: 3rd (2012).
- World Team Cup: 2nd (2007); 3rd (2010).
