= Haruna Fukuoka =

Japanese table tennis player

Personal information
- Nationality: Japan
- Born: January 25, 1984 (age 42) Tokushima, Japan
- Height: 1.56 m (5 ft 1 in)

Sport
- Sport: Table tennis
- Playing style: Right-handed, shakehand grip
- Highest ranking: 20 (November 2007)
Medal record
Women's table tennis
Representing Japan
World Championships
Bronze medal – third place	2006 Bremen	Team
Bronze medal – third place	2008 Guangzhou	Team

Haruna Fukuoka (福岡 春菜, Fukuoka Haruna) (born 25 January 1984 in Tokushima) is a Japanese table tennis player.

She competed at the 2008 Summer Olympics, reaching the third round of the singles competition. She also competed in the team competition, reaching the bronze medal final but losing to South Korea.
