= Fan Ying =

Chinese table tennis player

Personal information
- Native name: 范瑛
- Full name: Fan Ying
- Nationality: China
- Born: 12 February 1986 (age 40)
- Height: 1.62 m (5 ft 4 in)
- Weight: 58 kg (128 lb; 9.1 st)

Sport
- Sport: Table tennis
- Playing style: Right-handed, shakehand grip
- Highest ranking: 10 (December 2009)
Medal record
Universiade
Gold medal – first place	2011 Shenzhen	Team
Silver medal – second place	2011 Shenzhen	Singles

Fan Ying (Chinese: 范瑛; pinyin: Fàn Yīng; born February 12, 1986) is a Chinese table tennis player.

== Career records ==
Singles (as of July 31, 2010)

- World Championships: round of 16 (2005).
- Pro Tour winner (1): Polish Open 2009. Runner-up (3): German Open 2002; German Open 2005; Slovenian Open 2009.
- Asian Championships: SF (2009).
- Asian Cup: 1st (2003).

Women's doubles

- Pro Tour winner (3): Austrian Open 2002; Slovenian, Polish Open 2009. Runner-up (): China (Wuxi) Open 2004; Danish Open 2009.
- Pro Tour Grand Finals appearances: 1. Record: QF (2002).
- Asian Championships: QF (2009).

Mixed doubles

- World Championships: QF (2009).

Teams

- Asian Championships: 1st (2009).
