= Peng Luyang =

Chinese table tennis player

Personal information
- Nationality: Chinese
- Born: 10 January 1985 (age 40)

Sport
- Sport: Table tennis

Peng Luyang (born 10 January 1985) is a Chinese table tennis player. Her highest career ITTF ranking was 25.
