= Manca Fajmut =

Slovenian table tennis player

Personal information
- Nationality: Slovenian
- Born: 26 November 1990 (age 35)

Sport
- Sport: Table tennis

Manca Fajmut (born 26 November 1990) is a Slovenian table tennis player. Her highest career ITTF ranking was 176.
