= Chang Chenchen =

Chinese table tennis player

Personal information
- Nationality: China
- Born: 20 June 1986 (age 40)
Medal record
Representing China
World Table Tennis Championships
Bronze medal – third place	2009	Mixed Doubles

Chang Chenchen (born 20 June 1986) is a female Chinese international table tennis player.

She won the bronze medal at the 2009 World Table Tennis Championships – Mixed doubles with Hao Shuai.

== See also ==
- List of table tennis players
