= Cao Zhen (table tennis) =

Chinese table tennis player

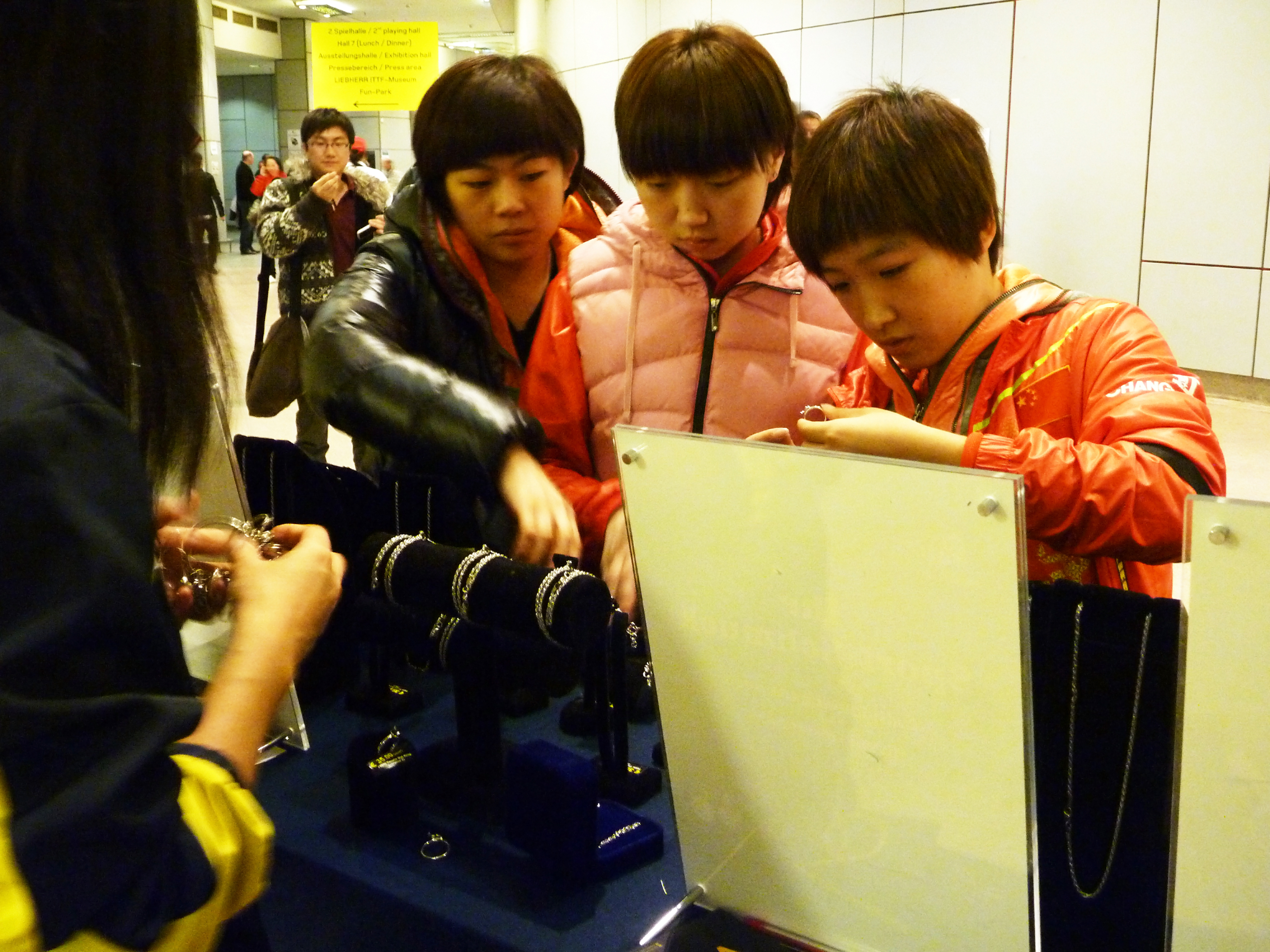

Personal information
- Native name: 曹臻
- Full name: Cao Zhen
- Nationality: China
- Born: 8 January 1987 (age 39) Shandong, China
- Height: 1.64 m (5 ft 4 1/2 in)
- Weight: 55 kg (121 lb; 8.7 st)

Sport
- Sport: Table tennis
- Playing style: Right-handed, shakehand grip
- Highest ranking: 11 (January 2005)
Medal record
Women's table tennis
Representing China
World Championships
Gold medal – first place	2011 Rotterdam	Mixed Doubles
Gold medal – first place	2009 Yokohama	Mixed Doubles
Bronze medal – third place	2007 Zagreb	Mixed Doubles
Bronze medal – third place	2005 Shanghai	Mixed Doubles

Cao Zhen (Chinese: 曹臻; pinyin: Cáo Zhēn; born January 8, 1987, in Shandong) is a Chinese table tennis player.

== Career records ==
Singles (as of May 13, 2011)

- World Championships: round of 16 (2005)
- Pro Tour winner (5): Malaysia Open 2003; China (Wuxi) Open 2004; German, Swedish Open 2005; Slovenian Open 2009. Runner-up (2): Austrian Open 2004; German Open 2007.

Women's doubles

- World Championships: QF (2009)
- Pro Tour winner (5): Malaysia Open 2003; China (Wuxi), Austrian Open 2004; Japan Open 2005; Slovenian Open 2009. Runner-up (2): Danish, China (Tianjin) Open 2009.

Mixed doubles

- World Championships: winner (2009, 11); SF (2005, 07)
