= Misako Wakamiya =

Japanese table tennis player

Personal information
- Native name: 若宮三紗子
- Nationality: Japanese
- Born: 23 June 1989 (age 36) Tadotsu, Kagawa, Japan

Sport
- Sport: Table tennis

Misako Wakamiya (若宮三紗子, Wakamiya Misako; born 23 May 1989) is a table tennis player. Her highest career ITTF ranking was 24.

== Biography ==
Wakamiya started playing table tennis in the Tadotsu Sports Club in Grade 1 of elementary school. Upon graduating from Jinsei Gakuen High School in Takase, Kagawa, she attended Ritsumeikan University.

In 2009, Wakamiya made her national team debut at the age of 19 after winning the Inter-High School Championships. In October 2008, as a college student, she won both the singles and doubles titles at the All Japan Student Championships. During the mixed double tournament, Wakamiya collaborated with compatriot and fellow debutant Jin Ueda.
