= Tian Yuan (table tennis) =

Croatian table tennis player

Tian Yuan (Chinese: 田原 or 田媛; pinyin: Tián Yuán； born 12 January 1975 in Shenyang) is a Chinese-born table tennis player who competes internationally for Croatia. She competed for Croatia at the 2012 Summer Olympics reaching the second round.

Tian Yuan moved to Croatia in 1999. As of 2017, she lives in Varaždin, works as the coach of the Croatia women's national team, and also plays for Grand-Quevilly in the French table tennis league.
