= Jiang Huajun =

Hong Kong table tennis player

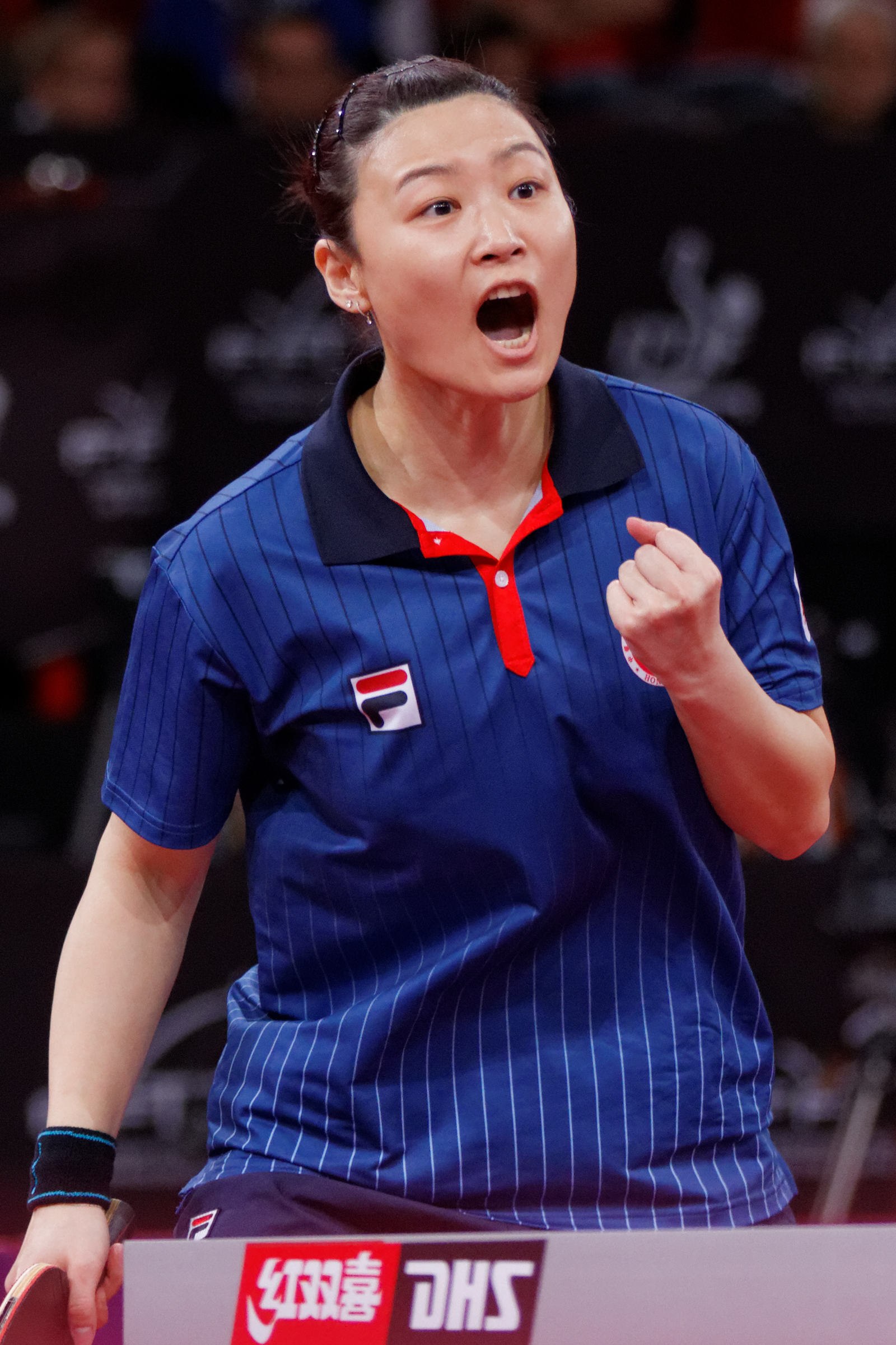
- Mondial Ping 2013

Personal information
- Nationality: Hong Kong
- Born: 8 October 1984 (age 41) Shandong, China
- Height: 1.68 m (5 ft 6 in)

Sport
- Sport: Table tennis
- Playing style: Right-handed, shakehand grip
- Highest ranking: 7 (July 2007)
Medal record
Women's table tennis
Representing Hong Kong
World Championships
Bronze medal – third place	2008 Guangzhou	Team
Bronze medal – third place	2009 Yokohama	Doubles
Bronze medal – third place	2011 Rotterdam	Doubles
Bronze medal – third place	2011 Rotterdam	Mixed Doubles
Bronze medal – third place	2012 Dortmund	Team
Bronze medal – third place	2013 Paris	Mixed Doubles
Bronze medal – third place	2014 Tokyo	Team
World Cup
Silver medal – second place	2010 Kuala Lumpur	Singles

Jiang Huajun (simplified Chinese: 姜华珺; traditional Chinese: 姜華珺; pinyin: Jiāng Huá Jùn; Jyutping: goeng^{1} waa^{4} gwan^{6}; born 8 October 1984) is a table tennis player from Hong Kong, China.

== Career records ==
Singles (as of September 4, 2015)

- Olympic Games: Round of 16 (2012)
- World Championships: Round of 16 (2009, 11, 13, 15).
- World Cup appearances: 8. Record: runner-up (2010).
- Pro Tour winner (4): Kuwait Open 2006, Chile, Korea Open 2007, Spanish Open 2013.
  Runner-up (3): Korea Open 2002. Korea Open 2009. Spanish Open 2011.
- Pro Tour Grand Finals appearances: 5. Record: QF (2007).
- Asian Games: QF (2010).
- Asian Championships: QF (2007, 09).
- Asian Cup: 1st (2007). 2nd (2003).

Women's doubles

- World Championships: SF (2009, 2011).
- Pro Tour winner (6): Egypt Open 2002. Chile, China (Shanghai) Open 2008. Spanish Open 2011, China (Shanghai) Open 2012, Qatar Open 2015.
  Runner-up (8): Swedish Open 2001. Austrian Open 2002. Croatian Open 2003. Chile Open 2007. Kuwait, Korea Open 2009. German Open 2012. Hungarian Open 2015
- Pro Tour Grand Finals appearances: 5. Record: runner-up (2009, 10). SF (2008, 2012).
- Asian Championships: QF (2007, 09).

Mixed doubles

- World Championships: SF (2011, 2013).
- Asian Games: runner-up (2010).

Team

- Olympic Games: 5th (2012)
- World Championships: 3rd (2008, 2012, 2014).
- World Team Cup: 3rd (2009, 2013).
