= Eva Ódorová =

Slovak table tennis player

Eva Ódorová (born 22 November 1979 in Komárno) is a Slovak table tennis player.

Ódorová competed at the 2008 Summer Olympics, reaching the second round of the singles competition. She also competed in the team competition.
