= Carole Grundisch =

French table tennis player

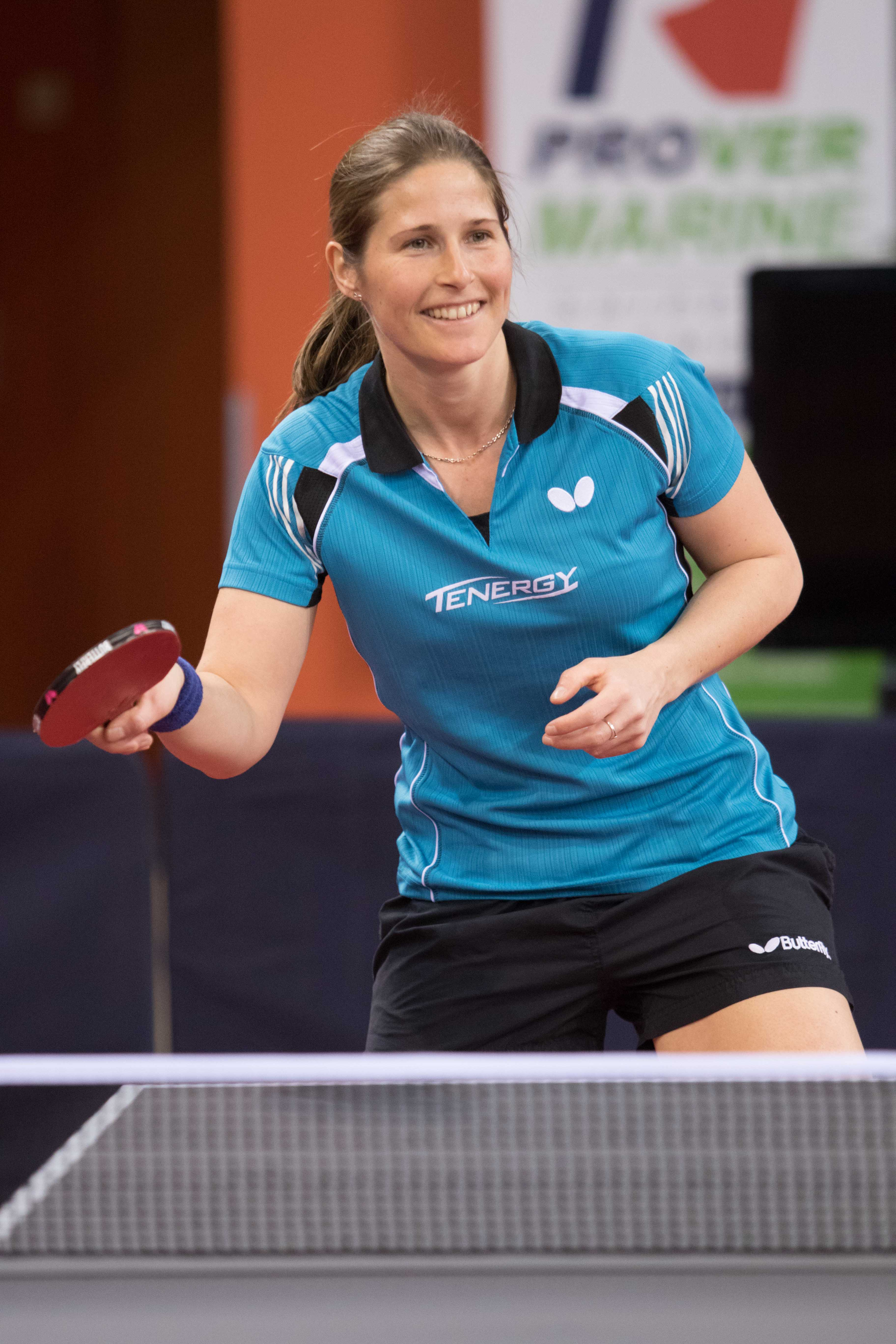
- Carole Grundisch

Personal information
- Nationality: French
- Born: 7 September 1986 (age 38); Saint-Mandé, France

Sport
- Sport: Table tennis

Carole Grundisch (born 7 September 1986) is a French table tennis player. Her highest career ITTF ranking was 68.
