= Sara Ramírez (table tennis) =

Spanish table tennis player

Personal information
- Full name: Sara Ramírez Bermúdez
- Nationality: Spain
- Born: September 4, 1987 (age 38) Ripollet, Spain
- Height: 1.63 m (5 ft 4 in)
- Weight: 50 kg (110 lb)

Sport
- Sport: Table tennis
- Club: Fotoprix Vic
- Playing style: Right-handed
Medal record
Women's table tennis
Representing Spain
Mediterranean Games
Gold medal – first place	2013 Mersin	Team
Silver medal – second place	2013 Mersin	Singles
European Championships
Bronze medal – third place	2013 Schwechat	Doubles

Sara Ramírez Bermúdez (born September 4, 1987) is a Spanish table tennis player. She was born in Ripollet.

As of July 2012 her rank is 29th in Europe and 83rd in the world.

She competed for Spain in Women's singles and Women's team Table Tennis at the 2012 Summer Olympics.
