= 2007 World Table Tennis Championships – Women's doubles =

Women's doubles at the 2007 World Table Tennis Championships
- Venue: Dom Sportova
- Location: Zagreb, Croatia
- Final score: 11–5, 11–6, 13–11, 11–9

Medalists
gold medal	Wang Nan; Zhang Yining	China
silver medal	Guo Yue; Li Xiaoxia	China
bronze medal	Li Jiawei; Wang Yuegu	Singapore
bronze medal	Kim Kyung-ah; Park Mi-young	South Korea

The 2007 World Table Tennis Championships women's doubles was the 48th edition of the women's doubles championship. Zhang Yining and Wang Nan defeated Li Xiaoxia and Guo Yue in the final by four sets to nil, to record their third consecutive title and Wang Nan's fifth consecutive title.

== Seeds ==
1. (China) Wang Nan / (China) Zhang Yining (champions)
2. (China) Guo Yue / (China) Li Xiaoxia (final)
3. (Hong Kong) Tie Ya Na / (Hong Kong) Zhang Rui (third round)
4. (Singapore) Li Jiawei / (Singapore) Wang Yuegu (semifinals)
5. (South Korea) Kim Kyung-ah / (South Korea) Park Mi-young (semifinals)
6. (Japan) Ai Fujinuma / (Japan) Ai Fukuhara (second round)
7. (China) Li Nan / (China) Liu Shiwen (quarterfinals)
8. (Hong Kong) Lau Sui Fei / (Hong Kong) Lin Ling (third round)
9. (Hungary) Georgina Póta / (Hungary) Krisztina Tóth (quarterfinals)
10. (Italy) Nikoleta Stefanova / (Italy) Wenling Tan Monfardini (second round)
11. (Germany) Elke Schall / (Germany) Wu Jiaduo (first round)
12. (Austria) Veronika Heine / (Austria) Liu Jia (first round)
13. (South Korea) Lee Eun-hee / (South Korea) Kim Jung-hyun (third round)
14. (Belarus) Tatyana Kostromina / (Belarus) Viktoria Pavlovich (second round)
15. (United States) Gao Jun / (United States) Wang Chen (third round)
16. (Japan) Sayaka Hirano / (Japan) Kasumi Ishikawa (second round)

== Finals ==
Quarterfinals
1	(China) Wang Nan (China) Zhang Yining	11	9	9	11	11	11
7	(China) Li Nan (China) Liu Shiwen	4	11	11	7	5	2
(Germany) Zhenqi Barthel (Germany) Nicole Struse	6	3	11	4	11	1
4	(Singapore) Li Jiawei (Singapore) Wang Yuegu	11	11	6	11	5	11
9	(Hungary) Georgina Póta (Hungary) Krisztina Tóth	10	10	14	11	10
5	(South Korea) Kim Kyung-ah (South Korea) Park Mi-young	12	12	16	9	12
(South Korea) Cho Ha-La (South Korea) Moon Hyun-Jung	7	5	3	8
2	(China) Guo Yue (China) Li Xiaoxia	11	11	11	11

Semifinals
1	(China) Wang Nan (China) Zhang Yining	11	11	7	11	11
4	(Singapore) Li Jiawei (Singapore) Wang Yuegu	1	9	11	8	9
5	(South Korea) Kim Kyung-ah (South Korea) Park Mi-young	11	10	12	5	7	3
2	(China) Guo Yue (China) Li Xiaoxia	4	12	10	11	11	11

Final
1	(China) Wang Nan (China) Zhang Yining	11	11	13	11
2	(China) Guo Yue (China) Li Xiaoxia	5	6	11	9

== Main draw ==
=== Top half ===
==== Section 1 ====
First round
1	(China) Wang N (China) Zhang Y	11	11	11	11
(United States) T Banh Thua (United States) C X Huang	6	6	6	4
(Slovenia) M Safran (Slovenia) B Todorovic	2	8	6	6
(Chinese Taipei) Huang Y-H (Chinese Taipei) Lu Y-F	11	11	11	11
(Romania) D Dodean (Romania) E Samara	11	11	7	11	12	11	11
(Austria) Q Li (Austria) M Petzner	5	4	11	6	14	13	8
(Ukraine) G Gaponova (Ukraine) T Sorochynska	14	11	7	12	9	11
10	(Italy) N Stefanova (Italy) W Tan	12	5	11	14	11	13
11	(Germany) E Schall (Germany) J Wu	11	8	11	11	9	9	8
(Greece) C Fili (Greece) E Ntoulaki	8	11	2	9	11	11	11
(Poland) N Bak (Poland) N Partyka	10	6	13	6	6
(Hungary) P Lovas (Hungary) S Pergel	12	11	11	11	11
(Russia) S Ganina (Russia) I Kotikhina	11	11	8	11	11
(Serbia) A Erdelji (Serbia) G Feher	7	9	11	4	8
(Belarus) V Pavlovich (Belarus) A Privalova	3	6	5	5
7	(China) Li N (China) Liu Shiwen	11	11	11	11

Second round
1	(China) Wang N (China) Zhang Y	11	11	11	5	11
(Chinese Taipei) Huang Y-H (Chinese Taipei) Lu Y-F	7	8	4	11	6
(Romania) D Dodean (Romania) E Samara	9	11	8	12	6	11	11
10	(Italy) N Stefanova (Italy) W Tan	11	9	11	10	11	7	9
(Greece) C Fili (Greece) E Ntoulaki	11	12	3	9	7	8
(Hungary) P Lovas (Hungary) S Pergel	8	10	11	11	11	11
(Russia) S Ganina (Russia) I Kotikhina	8	9	8	8
7	(China) Li N (China) Liu Shiwen	11	11	11	11

Third round
1	(China) Wang N (China) Zhang Y	11	11	11	11
(Romania) D Dodean (Romania) E Samara	9	7	5	6
(Hungary) P Lovas (Hungary) S Pergel	6	9	6	1
7	(China) Li N (China) Liu Shiwen	11	11	11	11

Quarterfinals
1	(China) Wang N (China) Zhang Y	11	9	9	11	11	11
7	(China) Li N (China) Liu Shiwen	4	11	11	7	5	3

==== Section 2 ====
First round
8	(Hong Kong) Lau S (Hong Kong) Lin L	11	12	11	11
(Canada) S Yuen (Canada) M Zhang	7	10	9	5
(Iran) M Omarani (Iran) O Titarenko	5	7	7	11
(Sweden) M Ekholm (Sweden) C Jonsson	11	11	11	13
(Germany) Z Barthel (Germany) N Struse	11	11	11	11
(Uzbekistan) E Levina (Uzbekistan) S Makhmudova	9	1	4	5
(Czech Republic) K Penkavova (Czech Republic) I Weberova	3	8	5	7
14	(Belarus) T Kostromina (Belarus) V Pavlovich	11	11	11	11
13	(South Korea) Kim J-H (South Korea) Lee E-H	11	11	11	11
(Poland) M Golota (Poland) J Xu	8	8	8	2
(Portugal) P S Goncalves (Portugal) A Neves	11	2	8	10	12	4
(France) C Grundisch (France) Y F Xian	7	11	11	12	10	11
(Czech Republic) R Strbikova (Czech Republic) I Vacenovska	11	11	5	11	10	7	8
(Greece) F Exarchou (Greece) M Mirou	7	7	11	7	12	11	11
(Chile) P Vega (Chile) M Yanez	3	1	8	4
4	(Singapore) Li J (Singapore) Wang Y	11	11	11	11

Second round
8	(Hong Kong) Lau S (Hong Kong) Lin L	11	11	11	11
(Sweden) M Ekholm (Sweden) C Jonsson	2	3	6	4
(Germany) Z Barthel (Germany) N Struse	11	11	11	10	11
14	(Belarus) T Kostromina (Belarus) V Pavlovich	4	7	4	12	6
13	(South Korea) Kim J-H (South Korea) Lee E-H	9	11	11	9	6	11	11
(France) C Grundisch (France) Y F Xian	11	5	8	11	11	9	7
(Czech Republic) R Strbikova (Czech Republic) I Vacenovska	2	5	2	3
4	(Singapore) Li J (Singapore) Wang Y	11	11	11	11

Third round
8	(Hong Kong) Lau S (Hong Kong) Lin L	8	4	11	9
(Germany) Z Barthel (Germany) N Struse	11	11	13	11
13	(South Korea) Kim J-H (South Korea) Lee E-H	11	12	7	7	7	11	14
4	(Singapore) Li J (Singapore) Wang Y	9	10	11	11	11	9	16

Quarterfinals
(Germany) Z Barthel (Germany) N Struse	6	3	11	4	11	1
4	(Singapore) Li J (Singapore) Wang Y	11	11	6	11	5	11

=== Bottom half ===
==== Section 3 ====
First round
3	(Hong Kong) Tie Y (Hong Kong) Zhang R	11	12	11	11
(Lithuania) I Kardauskaite (Lithuania) L Misikonyte	1	10	6	3
(India) M Das (India) P Ghatak	6	5	9	6
(Spain) G Dvorak (Spain) S Ramirez	11	11	11	11
(Chinese Taipei) Cheng I-C (Chinese Taipei) Lee I-C	11	7	11	11	9	5	11
(Russia) A Koltsova (Ukraine) M Pesotska	4	11	4	5	11	11	7
(Venezuela) R Ezzeddine (Venezuela) F Ramos	5	2	9	10
9	(Hungary) G Póta (Hungary) K Tóth	11	11	11	12
16	(Japan) S Hirano (Japan) K Ishikawa	11	11	11	11
(New Zealand) K Li (New Zealand) A Yang	8	5	9	7
(Serbia) E Rečko (Serbia) E Tapai	8	13	9	5
(North Korea) Kim J (North Korea) Ko U-G	11	15	11	11
(Croatia) S Paović (Croatia) C Molnar	12	11	11	11
(Australia) M Miao (Australia) X S Sang	10	4	9	9
(Slovakia) B Balazova (Slovakia) J Medrikova	4	5	6	3
5	(South Korea) Kim K-A (South Korea) Park M-Y	11	11	11	11

Second round
3	(Hong Kong) Tie Y (Hong Kong) Zhang R	11	11	11	13
(Spain) G Dvorak (Spain) S Ramirez	8	5	8	11
(Chinese Taipei) Cheng I-C (Chinese Taipei) Lee I-C	2	11	8	6	8
9	(Hungary) G Póta (Hungary) K Tóth	11	8	11	11	11
16	(Japan) S Hirano (Japan) K Ishikawa	9	4	8	3
(North Korea) Kim J (North Korea) Ko U-G	11	11	11	11
(Croatia) S Paović (Croatia) C Molnar	7	10	11	3	7
5	(South Korea) Kim K-A (South Korea) Park M-Y	11	12	9	11	11

Third round
3	(Hong Kong) Tie Y (Hong Kong) Zhang R	11	10	7	11	11	4
9	(Hungary) G Póta (Hungary) K Tóth	13	12	11	7	5	11
(North Korea) Kim J (North Korea) Ko U-G	7	9	13	9	13	9
5	(South Korea) Kim K-A (South Korea) Park M-Y	11	11	11	11	11	11

Quarterfinals
9	(Hungary) G Póta (Hungary) K Tóth	10	10	14	11	10
5	(South Korea) Kim K-A (South Korea) Park M-Y	12	12	16	9	12

==== Section 4 ====
First round
6	(Japan) A Fujinuma (Japan) A Fukuhara	11	14	11	16
(Bulgaria) K Gatinska (Bulgaria) A Kasabova	7	12	8	14
(Russia) Y Prokhorova (Russia) A Voronova	6	6	11	6	11	11	8
(South Korea) Cho H-L (South Korea) Moon H-J	11	11	3	11	8	7	11
(North Korea) Kim H-S (North Korea) O U-J	11	13	11	12
(Netherlands) L Creemers (Netherlands) C Nouwen	9	11	7	10
(Malaysia) Beh L W (Malaysia) Ng S K	11	11	10	7	8	11	11
12	(Austria) V Heine (Austria) J Liu	4	7	12	11	11	8	6
15	(United States) J Gao (United States) C Wang	11	11	11	11
(Croatia) A Bakula (Croatia) S Vugrinec	6	7	3	8
(Croatia) I Knežević (Croatia) S Paukovic	10	12	10	15	9
(Italy) L Negrisoli (Italy) Y Wang	12	10	12	17	11
(Thailand) N Komwong (Thailand) A Muangsuk	11	8	11	12	11
(Cameroon) S Hanffou (France) L Phai Pang	9	11	6	10	9
(Denmark) A-C Bomann (Denmark) M Skov	1	1	3	5
2	(China) Guo Y (China) Li X	11	11	11	11

Second round
6	(Japan) A Fujinuma (Japan) A Fukuhara	10	3	11	9	8
(South Korea) Cho H-L (South Korea) Moon H-J	12	11	9	11	11
(North Korea) Kim H-S (North Korea) O U-J	6	8	6	7
(Malaysia) Beh L W (Malaysia) Ng S K	11	11	11	11
15	(United States) J Gao (United States) C Wang	9	11	11	11	11
(Italy) L Negrisoli (Italy) Y Wang	11	6	6	7	7
(Thailand) N Komwong (Thailand) A Muangsuk	7	4	5	3
2	(China) Guo Y (China) Li X	11	11	11	11

Third round
(South Korea) Cho H-L (South Korea) Moon H-J	11	11	11	11
(Malaysia) Beh L W (Malaysia) Ng S K	6	9	4	9
15	(United States) J Gao (United States) C Wang	4	3	7	6
2	(China) Guo Y (China) Li X	11	11	11	11

Quarterfinals
(South Korea) Cho H-L (South Korea) Moon H-J	7	5	3	8
2	(China) Guo Y (China) Li X	11	11	11	11
