= 2009 World Table Tennis Championships – Women's doubles =

Women's doubles at the 2009 World Table Tennis Championships
- Venue: Yokohama Arena
- Location: Yokohama, Japan
- Final score: 11–8, 12–10, 11–4, 3–11, 11–7

Medalists
gold medal	Guo Yue; Li Xiaoxia	China
silver medal	Ding Ning; Guo Yan	China
bronze medal	Jiang Huajun; Tie Ya Na	Hong Kong
bronze medal	Kim Kyung-ah; Park Mi-young	South Korea

The 2009 World Table Tennis Championships women's doubles was the 49th edition of the women's doubles championship. Li Xiaoxia and Guo Yue defeated Ding Ning and Guo Yan in the final by four sets to one.

== Seeds ==
1. (China) Guo Yue / (China) Li Xiaoxia (champions)
2. (China) Ding Ning / (China) Guo Yan (final)
3. (Hong Kong) Jiang Huajun / (Hong Kong) Tie Ya Na (semifinals)
4. (South Korea) Kim Kyung-ah / (South Korea) Park Mi-young (semifinals)
5. (Singapore) Feng Tianwei / (Singapore) Wang Yuegu (quarterfinals)
6. (China) Cao Zhen / (China) Liu Shiwen (quarterfinals)
7. (Japan) Ai Fukuhara / (Japan) Sayaka Hirano (quarterfinals)
8. (Singapore) Sun Beibei / (Singapore) Yu Mengyu (third round)
9. (Hungary) Georgina Póta / (Hungary) Krisztina Tóth (third round)
10. (South Korea) Dang Ye-seo / (South Korea) Lee Eun-hee (third round)
11. (Netherlands) Li Jiao / (Netherlands) Li Jie (first round)
12. (Germany) Elke Schall / (Germany) Wu Jiaduo (third round)
13. (Hong Kong) Lin Ling / (Hong Kong) Zhang Rui (quarterfinals)
14. (Italy) Nikoleta Stefanova / (Italy) Wenling Tan Monfardini (second round)
15. (Romania) Daniela Dodean / (Romania) Elizabeta Samara (second round)
16. (Austria) Li Qiangbing / (Austria) Liu Jia (third round)

== Final Rounds ==
Quarterfinals
1	(China) Guo Yue (China) Li Xiaoxia	11	11	11	12
7	(Japan) Ai Fukuhara (Japan) Sayaka Hirano	6	9	3	10
5	(Singapore) Feng Tianwei (Singapore) Wang Yue Gu	11	11	11	3	11	9
3	(Hong Kong) Jiang Huajun (Hong Kong) Tie Ya Na	3	13	13	11	9	11
4	(South Korea) Kim Kyung-ah (South Korea) Park Mi-young	11	11	11	12
13	(Hong Kong) Lin Ling (Hong Kong) Zhang Rui	5	4	8	10
6	(China) Cao Zhen (China) Liu Shiwen	11	13	9	2	9	10
2	(China) Ding Ning (China) Guo Yan	4	11	11	11	11	12

Semifinals
1	(China) Guo Yue (China) Li Xiaoxia	11	11	11	11
3	(Hong Kong) Jiang Huajun (Hong Kong) Tie Ya Na	7	8	5	9
4	(South Korea) Kim Kyung-ah (South Korea) Park Mi-young	3	9	14	10	10
2	(China) Ding Ning (China) Guo Yan	11	11	12	12	12

Finals
1	(China) Guo Yue (China) Li Xiaoxia	11	12	11	3	11
2	(China) Ding Ning (China) Guo Yan	8	10	4	11	7

== Early rounds ==
=== Section 1 ===
First Round
1	(China) Guo Yue (China) Li Xiaoxia	10	11	11	11	11
16	(France) Carole Grundisch (France) Audrey Mattenet	12	7	4	3	5
Q	(Finland) Hanna Nyberg (Finland) H. Punnonen	4	8	1	9
9	(United States) Gao Jun (United States) Crystal Xi Huang	11	11	11	11
5	(Germany) Zhenqi Barthel (Germany) K. Silbereisen	11	11	11	11
Q	(Mexico) Mercedes Madrid (Mexico) Laura Rosales	7	1	7	8
4	(Sweden) Matilda Ekholm (Sweden) Malin Pettersson	11	2	11	9	5	5
14	(Italy) N. Stefanova (Italy) W. T. Monfardini	6	11	8	11	11	11
12	(Germany) Elke Schall (Germany) Wu Jiaduo	11	11	11	11
Q	(Singapore) Isabelle Siyun Li (Singapore) Kai Xin Zena Sim	8	9	7	5
3	(Chinese Taipei) Cheng I-Ching (Chinese Taipei) Hsiung Nai-I	11	4	3	8	10
14	(South Korea) Park Young Sook (South Korea) Seok Ha Jung	9	11	11	11	12
7	(Turkey) Sirin He (Turkey) Melek Hu	WO
10	(Republic of the Congo) Han Xing (Republic of the Congo) Yang Fen
2	(Russia) Polina Mikhaylova (Russia) Elena Troshneva	2	4	12	7	7
7	(Japan) Ai Fukuhara (Japan) Sayaka Hirano	11	11	10	11	11

Second Round
1	(China) Guo Yue (China) Li Xiaoxia	11	11	11	11
(United States) Gao Jun (United States) Crystal Xi Huang	2	6	4	6
(Germany) Zhenqi Barthel (Germany) K. Silbereisen	11	12	11	11	9	12
14	(Italy) N. Stefanova (Italy) W. T. Monfardini	5	14	5	4	11	10
12	(Germany) Elke Schall (Germany) Wu Jiaduo	11	11	8	3	11	11
(South Korea) Park Young Sook (South Korea) Seok Ha Jung	9	6	11	11	4	8
(Turkey) Sirin He (Turkey) Melek Hu	9	6	11	11	8	7
7	(Japan) Ai Fukuhara (Japan) Sayaka Hirano	11	11	4	8	11	11

Third Round
1	(China) Guo Yue (China) Li Xiaoxia	11	11	13	11
(Germany) Zhenqi Barthel (Germany) K. Silbereisen	5	8	11	7
12	(Germany) Elke Schall (Germany) Wu Jiaduo	9	11	11	7	6	4
7	(Japan) Ai Fukuhara (Japan) Sayaka Hirano	11	5	5	11	11	11

Quarter Finals
1	(China) Guo Yue (China) Li Xiaoxia	11	11	11	12
7	(Japan) Ai Fukuhara (Japan) Sayaka Hirano	6	9	3	10

=== Section 2 ===
First Round
5	(Singapore) Feng Tianwei (Singapore) Wang Yue Gu	11	11	11	11
Q	(Lithuania) Ieva Juceviciute (Lithuania) R. Paskauskiene	8	6	5	5
8	(Ukraine) Ganna Gaponova (Ukraine) T. Sorochynska	11	12	11	11
9	(Malaysia) Beh Lee Wei (Malaysia) Ng Sock Khim	9	10	8	6
5	(Poland) Natalia Partyka (Poland) Xu Jie	11	11	11	11
12	(Brazil) Mariany Nonaka (Brazil) Ligia Santos Silva	7	5	2	3
4	(Croatia) Andrea Bakula (Croatia) Mirela Durak	3	8	8	8
15	(Romania) Daniela Dodean (Romania) Elizabeta Samara	11	11	11	11
9	(Hungary) Georgina Pota (Hungary) Krisztina Toth	11	11	11	11
11	(Luxembourg) Simone Haan (Luxembourg) Ni Xia Lian	6	9	7	6
Q	(United States) Ariel Hsing (United States) Lily Zhang	8	3	11	4	8
14	(Thailand) N. Komwong (Thailand) A. Muangsuk	11	11	4	11	11
7	(Japan) Hiroko Fujii (Japan) Kasumi Ishikawa	11	11	11	11
Q	(Macau) Cheong Cheng I (Macau) Ma Chao In	4	8	1	5
2	(Belarus) V. Pavlovich (Belarus) A. Privalova	10	4	7	13
3	(Hong Kong) Jiang Huajun (Hong Kong) Tie Ya Na	12	11	11	15

Second Round
5	(Singapore) Feng Tianwei (Singapore) Wang Yue Gu	11	11	11	11
(Ukraine) Ganna Gaponova (Ukraine) T. Sorochynska	5	6	5	7
(Poland) Natalia Partyka (Poland) Xu Jie	11	12	5	11	6	10	13
15	(Romania) Daniela Dodean (Romania) Elizabeta Samara	9	10	11	5	11	12	11
9	(Hungary) Georgina Pota (Hungary) Krisztina Toth	11	11	11	9	8	11
(Thailand) N. Komwong (Thailand) A. Muangsuk	8	5	9	11	11	7
(Japan) Hiroko Fujii (Japan) Kasumi Ishikawa	11	11	10	10	4	8
3	(Hong Kong) Jiang Huajun (Hong Kong) Tie Ya Na	4	9	12	12	11	11

Third Round
5	(Singapore) Feng Tianwei (Singapore) Wang Yue Gu	9	11	11	11	11
(Poland) Natalia Partyka (Poland) Xu Jie	11	7	9	8	8
9	(Hungary) Georgina Pota (Hungary) Krisztina Toth	9	2	7	6
3	(Hong Kong) Jiang Huajun (Hong Kong) Tie Ya Na	11	11	11	11

Quarterfinals
5	(Singapore) Feng Tianwei (Singapore) Wang Yue Gu	11	11	11	3	11	9
3	(Hong Kong) Jiang Huajun (Hong Kong) Tie Ya Na	3	13	13	11	9	11

=== Section 3 ===
First Round
4	(South Korea) Kim Kyung-ah (South Korea) Park Mi-young	11	11	11	11
Q	(New Zealand) Debbie Garrett (New Zealand) Armindeep Singh	4	1	4	3
Q	(Uzbekistan) N. Burkhankhodjae (Uzbekistan) Rimma Gufranova	4	3	6	5
9	(Russia) A. Tikhomirova (Russia) A. Voronova	11	11	11	11
5	(Hong Kong) Lau Sui Fei (Hong Kong) Yu Kwok See	11	11	11	11
Q	(Colombia) Johana Araque (Colombia) Paula Medina	3	4	4	8
Q	(Moldova) Olga Bliznet (Moldova) Elena Mocrousov	8	6	4	3
16	(Austria) Li Qiangbing (Austria) Liu Jia	11	11	11	11
13	(Hong Kong) Lin Ling (Hong Kong) Zhang Rui	11	11	11	11
Q	(Mongolia) B. Batsaikhan (Mongolia) Nomin-E. Chinbat	5	3	4	2
Q	(Slovenia) Manca Fajmut (Slovenia) Jana Tomazini	6	5	9	6
14	(Greece) Christina Fili (Greece) Ekaterina Ntoulaki	11	11	11	11
7	(Australia) Jian Fang Lay (Australia) Miao Miao
Q	(Venezuela) Ruaida Ezzeddine (Venezuela) Fabiola Ramos	WO
2	(Netherlands) Linda Creemers (Netherlands) Carla Nouwen	4	8	11	5	4
8	(Singapore) Sun Beibei (Singapore) Yu Mengyu	11	11	9	11	11

Second Round
4	(South Korea) Kim Kyung-ah (South Korea) Park Mi-young	11	11	4	11	11
(Russia) A. Tikhomirova (Russia) A. Voronova	5	6	11	8	6
(Hong Kong) Lau Sui Fei (Hong Kong) Yu Kwok See	11	5	8	7	12	6
16	(Austria) Li Qiangbing (Austria) Liu Jia	6	11	11	11	10	11
13	(Hong Kong) Lin Ling (Hong Kong) Zhang Rui	11	12	11	11
(Greece) Christina Fili (Greece) Ekaterina Ntoulaki	7	10	7	9
Q	(Venezuela) Ruaida Ezzeddine (Venezuela) Fabiola Ramos	5	1	5	12	6
8	(Singapore) Sun Beibei (Singapore) Yu Mengyu	11	11	11	10	11

Third Round
4	(South Korea) Kim Kyung-ah (South Korea) Park Mi-young	12	11	12	11
16	(Austria) Li Qiangbing (Austria) Liu Jia	10	9	10	7
13	(Hong Kong) Lin Ling (Hong Kong) Zhang Rui	11	9	11	11	11
8	(Singapore) Sun Beibei (Singapore) Yu Mengyu	7	11	5	6	8

Quarterfinals
4	(South Korea) Kim Kyung-ah (South Korea) Park Mi-young	11	11	11	12
13	(Hong Kong) Lin Ling (Hong Kong) Zhang Rui	5	4	8	10

=== Section 4 ===
First Round
6	(China) Cao Zhen (China) Liu Shiwen	11	11	11	11
16	(India) Mouma Das (India) Poulomi Ghatak	8	3	9	4
8	(Canada) Sara Yuen (Canada) Zhang Mo	5	9	11	5	8
9	(Czech Republic) Renata Strbikova (Czech Republic) I. Vacenovska	11	11	6	11	11
5	(Spain) Galia Dvorak (Spain) Sara Ramirez	WO
12	(Denmark) Pernille Agerholm (Denmark) Mie Skov
Q	(Bulgaria) Asya Kasabova (Bulgaria) Zhana Petrova	1	11	6	6	6
10	(South Korea) Dang Ye Seo (South Korea) Lee Eun Hee	11	8	11	11	11
11	(Netherlands) Li Jiao (Netherlands) Li Jie	8	11	8	9	11	11	5
11	(Slovakia) B. Balazova (Slovakia) Eva Odorova	11	6	11	11	5	6	11
Q	(New Zealand) Yang Sun (New Zealand) Annie Yang	3	2	5	2
14	(Japan) Ai Fujinuma (Japan) Reiko Hiura	11	11	11	11
7	(Chinese Taipei) Huang Yi-Hua (Chinese Taipei) Lu Yun-Feng	11	11	11	11
Q	(Egypt) Sara El-Sokary (Egypt) Raghd Magdy	3	4	6	5
2	(England) Joanna Parker (England) Kelly Sibley	4	6	10	11
2	(China) Ding Ning (China) Guo Yan	11	11	12	13

Second Round
6	(China) Cao Zhen (China) Liu Shiwen	15	11	11	11
(Czech Republic) Renata Strbikova (Czech Republic) I. Vacenovska	13	5	6	5
(Spain) Galia Dvorak (Spain) Sara Ramirez	6	10	7	6
10	(South Korea) Dang Ye Seo (South Korea) Lee Eun Hee	11	12	11	11
(Slovakia) B. Balazova (Slovakia) Eva Odorova	11	11	5	11	9	11
(Japan) Ai Fujinuma (Japan) Reiko Hiura	7	7	11	8	11	8
(Chinese Taipei) Huang Yi-Hua (Chinese Taipei) Lu Yun-Feng	5	4	3	6
2	(China) Ding Ning (China) Guo Yan	11	11	11	11

Third Round
6	(China) Cao Zhen (China) Liu Shiwen	11	11	11	7	11
10	(South Korea) Dang Ye Seo (South Korea) Lee Eun Hee	8	9	3	11	6
(Slovakia) B. Balazova (Slovakia) Eva Odorova	5	10	10	2
2	(China) Ding Ning (China) Guo Yan	11	12	12	11

Quarterfinals
6	(China) Cao Zhen (China) Liu Shiwen	11	13	9	2	9	10
2	(China) Ding Ning (China) Guo Yan	4	11	11	11	11	12

== See also ==
List of World Table Tennis Championships medalists
