= 2005 World Table Tennis Championships – Women's singles =

Women's singles at the 2005 World Table Tennis Championships
- Venue: Shanghai Grand Stage
- Location: Shanghai, China
- Final score: 5–11, 11–7, 11–7, 4–11,11–8, 13–11

Medalists
gold medal	Zhang Yining	China
silver medal	Guo Yan	China
bronze medal	Lin Ling	Hong Kong
bronze medal	Guo Yue	China

The 2005 World Table Tennis Championships women's singles was the 48th edition of the women's singles championship. Zhang Yining defeated Guo Yan in the final by four sets to two, to the title.

== Seeds ==
1. (China) Zhang Yining (champion)
2. (China) Wang Nan (third round)
3. (China) Niu Jianfeng (quarterfinals)
4. (Croatia) Tamara Boroš (fourth round)
5. (China) Guo Yue (semifinals)
6. (Singapore) Li Jiawei (third round)
7. (Hong Kong) Tie Ya Na (fourth round)
8. (China) Guo Yan (final)
9. (Austria) Liu Jia (third round)
10. (South Korea) Kim Kyung-ah (third round)
11. (Hong Kong) Lau Sui Fei (third round)
12. (China) Cao Zhen (fourth round)
13. (Romania) Mihaela Steff (third round)
14. (Belarus) Viktoria Pavlovich (quarterfinals)
15. (Hong Kong) Zhang Rui (third round)
16. (Hong Kong) Lin Ling (semifinals)
17. (United States) Gao Jun (quarterfinals)
18. (Hong Kong) Song Ah Sim (fourth round)
19. (Netherlands) Li Jiao (quarterfinals)
20. (Hungary) Krisztina Tóth (fourth round)
21. (Japan) Ai Fukuhara (third round)
22. (North Korea) Kim Hyang-mi (fourth round)
23. (China) Fan Ying (fourth round)
24. (Japan) Aya Umemura (second round)
25. (Germany) Nicole Struse (second round)
26. (Romania) Otilia Bădescu (second round)
27. (Italy) Wenling Tan Monfardini (third round)
28. (Hungary) Georgina Póta (third round)
29. (Germany) Elke Wosik (third round)
30. (Singapore) Zhang Xueling (third round)
31. (Russia) Svetlana Ganina (third round)
32. (Hungary) Mária Fazekas (first round)

== Finals ==
Quarterfinals
1	(China) Zhang Yining	11	11	11	11
14	(Belarus) Viktoria Pavlovich	5	2	4	2
17	(United States) Gao Jun	5	7	11	8	4
16	(Hong Kong) Lin Ling	11	11	9	11	11
3	(China) Niu Jianfeng	13	10	10	7	11	7
5	(China) Guo Yue	11	12	12	11	9	11
8	(China) Guo Yan	11	11	12	11
19	(Netherlands) Li Jiao	2	5	10	6

Semifinals
1	(China) Zhang Yining	10	11	11	11	11
16	(Hong Kong) Lin Ling	12	4	5	3	7
5	(China) Guo Yue	12	3	6	7	9
8	(China) Guo Yan	10	11	11	11	11

Final
1	(China) Zhang Yining	5	11	11	4	11	13
8	(China) Guo Yan	11	7	7	11	8	11

== Main draw ==
=== Top half ===
==== Section 1 ====
First round
1	(China) Zhang Y	11	11	11	11
(Colombia) P Medina	2	5	5	4
(Indonesia) L Istiyani	8	8	1	11	11	8
(Croatia) C Molnar	11	11	11	6	9	11
(Belgium) Y F Li	11	11	11	11	8	9	7
(San Marino) C Yan	5	6	13	8	11	11	11
(Spain) S Ramirez	12	11	8	11	12	15
32	(Hungary) M Fazekas	10	9	11	7	14	13
22	(North Korea) Kim H-M	11	12	11	11
(United States) T Banh Thua	7	10	9	4
(Dominican Republic) Q Lian	11	11	9	11	11	7
(North Korea) Ko U-G	5	13	11	13	8	11
(North Korea) Kim J	11	11	11	11
(Honduras) I Medina	6	2	7	6
(Chinese Taipei) Lee I-C	8	6	5	2
15	(Hong Kong) Zhang R	11	11	11	11

Second round
1	(China) Zhang Y	12	11	11	11
(Croatia) C Molnar	10	2	7	4
(San Marino) C Yan	6	11	11	11	8	12	11
(Spain) S Ramirez	11	13	8	5	11	10	6
22	(North Korea) Kim H-M	11	11	11	4	11
(North Korea) Ko U-G	5	8	5	11	3
(North Korea) Kim J	9	11	6	14	11	1
15	(Hong Kong) Zhang R	11	6	11	16	2	11

Third round
1	(China) Zhang Y	11	11	11	11
(San Marino) C Yan	2	5	2	4
22	(North Korea) Kim H-M	11	11	6	11	7	10	11
15	(Hong Kong) Zhang R	6	8	11	6	11	12	7

Fourth round
1	(China) Zhang Y	11	11	11	11
22	(North Korea) Kim H-M	4	4	7	5

==== Section 2 ====
First round
14	(Belarus) V Pavlovich	11	11	11	11	11
(Venezuela) F Ramos	4	3	13	8	7
(Thailand) A Muangsuk	11	7	9	15	11	9	13
(Chinese Taipei) Huang Y-H	7	11	11	13	5	11	11
(Japan) S Hirano	2	11	11	11	12
(England) J Parker	11	3	8	5	10
(Slovenia) B Todorovic	4	11	7	7	5
25	(Germany) N Struse	11	7	11	11	11
24	(Japan) A Umemura	11	11	11	10	11
(Malaysia) Beh L F	4	9	5	12	4
(United States) J Rather	9	3	11	6	11	5
(Hungary) C Bátorfi	11	11	6	11	8	11
(Italy) N Stefanova	11	8	11	11	11
(Lithuania) L Misikonyte	8	11	7	9	4
(United States) J Lee	2	5	3	11	5
7	(Hong Kong) Tie Y N	11	11	11	9	11

Second round
14	(Belarus) V Pavlovich	11	12	11	12
(Thailand) A Muangsuk	9	10	8	10
(Japan) S Hirano	11	7	6	12	11	11	11
25	(Germany) N Struse	7	11	11	10	13	9	8
24	(Japan) A Umemura	8	11	11	5	11	11	8
(Hungary) C Bátorfi	11	5	13	11	6	9	11
(Italy) N Stefanova	7	7	9	7
7	(Hong Kong) Tie Y N	11	11	11	11

Third round
14	(Belarus) V Pavlovich	7	14	11	11	9	9	11
(Japan) S Hirano	11	12	5	8	11	11	6
(Hungary) C Bátorfi
7	(Hong Kong) Tie Y N	w/o

Fourth round
14	(Belarus) V Pavlovich	11	11	11	11
7	(Hong Kong) Tie Y N	9	4	4	5

==== Section 3 ====
First round
6	(Singapore) Li J	11	11	11	11
(Slovenia) H Halas	7	9	6	5
(Sweden) M Ekholm	5	14	9	7
(Germany) K Silbereisen	11	16	11	11
(Slovakia) E Odorova	11	11	11	11
(Malaysia) Beh L W	8	9	9	8
(Hong Kong) Yu K S	5	9	11	4	3
17	(United States) J Gao	11	11	8	11	11
30	(Singapore) Zhang X	11	11	11	11
(Canada) C Xu	8	7	4	4
(Spain) G Dvorak	11	10	11	8	6
(Italy) L Negrisoli	8	12	13	11	11
(Russia) O Fadeeva	10	9	7	14
(North Korea) Han H-s	12	11	11	16
(Ukraine) E Kovtun	6	1	5	3
12	(China) Cao Z	11	11	11	11

Second round
6	(Singapore) Li J	8	11	11	11	4	7	11
(Germany) K Silbereisen	11	4	6	7	11	11	4
(Slovakia) E Odorova	4	11	2	6
17	(United States) J Gao	11	13	11	11
30	(Singapore) Zhang X	14	9	11	5	11	11
(Italy) L Negrisoli	12	11	7	11	7	9
(North Korea) Han H-s	4	6	6	6
12	(China) Cao Z	11	11	11	11

Third round
6	(Singapore) Li J	9	7	11	11	11	11	8
17	(United States) J Gao	11	11	8	5	5	13	11
30	(Singapore) Zhang X	7	11	10	11	3	7
12	(China) Cao Z	11	6	12	5	11	11

Fourth round
17	(United States) J Gao	11	11	9	11	11
12	(China) Cao Z	5	7	11	8	4

==== Section 4 ====
First round
16	(Hong Kong) Lin L	11	11	12	11
(Moldova) E Mocrousov	8	7	10	8
(Portugal) J Goncalves	8	3	5	2
(Singapore) Yan Xu	11	11	11	11
(Austria) Li Q	9	11	8	11	11	7	9
(Croatia) A Bakula	11	6	11	3	5	11	11
(Turkey) M I Ali	9	1	4	2
27	(Italy) W Tan Monfardini	11	11	11	11
31	(Russia) S Ganina	9	11	11	12	11
(Greece) M Mirou	11	6	3	10	7
(Malaysia) Chiu S J	5	5	9	7
(Lithuania) R Paskauskiene	11	11	11	11
(Germany) T Kramer	11	13	4	11	13	5	4
(Chinese Taipei) Pan L-C	2	11	11	7	15	11	11
(Austria) V Heine	4	7	6	6
4	(Croatia) T Boroš	11	11	11	11

Second round
16	(Hong Kong) Lin L	6	11	11	11	11
(Singapore) Yan Xu	11	6	8	5	4
(Croatia) A Bakula	8	5	9	8
27	(Italy) W Tan Monfardini	11	11	11	11
31	(Russia) S Ganina	11	11	11	11
(Lithuania) R Paskauskiene	9	6	7	1
(Chinese Taipei) Pan L-C	10	9	5	2
4	(Croatia) T Boroš	12	11	11	11

Third round
16	(Hong Kong) Lin L	11	12	11	4	11
27	(Italy) W Tan Monfardini	8	10	4	11	5
31	(Russia) S Ganina	6	7	11	8	7
4	(Croatia) T Boroš	11	11	9	11	11

Fourth round
16	(Hong Kong) Lin L	12	11	5	11	8	11
4	(Croatia) T Boroš	10	7	11	8	11	3

=== Bottom half ===
==== Section 5 ====
First round
3	(China) Niu J	11	11	11	11
(India) N Saha	4	2	8	2
(Germany) I Ivancan	5	8	11	7	8
(North Korea) Kim M-Y	11	11	7	11	11
(Singapore) Tan P F	11	9	11	11	11
(Turkey) N Mutlu	6	11	7	8	9
(Slovakia) L Kmotorkova	9	7	6	11	5
28	(Hungary) G Póta	11	11	11	8	11
20	(Hungary) K Tóth	11	11	11	11	11
(France) C Grundisch	13	5	4	9	5
(England) K Sibley	11	6	6	4	5
(Japan) H Fujii	6	11	11	11	11
(Israel) M Kravchenko
(Egypt) A Ashraf
(Greece) C Fili	4	3	11	10
9	(Austria) J Liu	11	11	13	12

Second round
3	(China) Niu J	11	11	11	11
(North Korea) Kim M-Y	5	5	1	4
(Singapore) Tan P F	11	8	11	11	8	7
28	(Hungary) G Póta	5	11	13	8	11	11
20	(Hungary) K Tóth	11	11	11	9	11	11
(Japan) H Fujii	8	8	8	11	13	9
(Israel) M Kravchenko	8	7	11	7	7
9	(Austria) J Liu	11	11	9	11	11

Third round
3	(China) Niu J	11	11	11	11
28	(Hungary) G Póta	5	3	8	1
20	(Hungary) K Tóth	11	13	9	4	11	11
9	(Austria) J Liu	6	11	11	11	5	6

Fourth round
3	(China) Niu J	11	11	11	11	11
20	(Hungary) K Tóth	13	8	8	3	6

==== Section 6 ====
First round
11	(Hong Kong) Lau S F	3	11	11	11	7	13
(South Korea) Kim H-H	11	9	3	8	11	11
(Ukraine) T Sorochynska	9	12	9	4	11	7
(Czech Republic) R Strbikova	11	10	11	11	2	11
(Japan) S Kanazawa	9	11	11	11	11
(Portugal) A Neves	11	4	5	8	3
(Belgium) K Opdencamp	1	5	3	5
23	(China) Fan Y	11	11	11	11
29	(Germany) E Schall	12	11	13	11
(Sweden) C Jonsson	10	6	11	7
(Slovenia) M Pohar	4	11	6	11	11	11
(Chinese Taipei) Lu Y-F	11	5	11	9	7	8
(Czech Republic) I Vacenovska	w/o
(Nigeria) O Oshonaike
(Greece) E Ntoulaki	8	11	4	9
5	(China) Guo Yue	11	13	11	11

Second round
11	(Hong Kong) Lau S F	11	11	11	11
(Czech Republic) R Strbikova	4	9	5	7
(Japan) S Kanazawa	6	7	6	5
23	(China) Fan Y	11	11	11	11
29	(Germany) E Schall	11	11	11	11
(Slovenia) M Pohar	9	6	6	8
(Czech Republic) I Vacenovska	6	3	4	3
5	(China) Guo Yue	11	11	11	11

Third round
11	(Hong Kong) Lau S F	11	11	10	5	18	6	6
23	(China) Fan Y	6	7	12	11	16	11	11
29	(Germany) E Schall	3	5	7	6
5	(China) Guo Yue	11	11	11	11

Fourth round
23	(China) Fan Y	8	6	5	7
5	(China) Guo Yue	11	11	11	11

==== Section 7 ====
First round
8	(China) Guo Yan	11	13	11	11
(Malaysia) Ng S K	6	11	4	9
(Bulgaria) A Kasabova	11	10	11	2	6	9
(Belarus) V Pavlovich	9	12	5	11	11	11
(Belarus) T Kostromina	11	11	11	11
(India) V Vijay	5	7	4	6
(Russia) A Voronova	11	6	7	9	11	7
21	(Japan) A Fukuhara	9	11	11	11	7	11
18	(Hong Kong) Song A S	11	11	12	11
(Croatia) S Paovic	5	6	10	4
(Russia) N Bolshakova	5	5	8	7
(South Korea) Jun H-K	11	11	11	11
(Australia) M Miao	11	11	11	11
(Kyrgyzstan) T Pronskaya	3	7	3	9
(Indonesia) C N Jusma	7	5	5	10
10	(South Korea) Kim K-A	11	11	11	12

Second round
8	(China) Guo Yan	11	11	11	13
(Belarus) V Pavlovich	9	2	4	11
(Belarus) T Kostromina	3	5	5	9
21	(Japan) A Fukuhara	11	11	11	11
18	(Hong Kong) Song A S	11	7	11	4	11	11
(South Korea) Jun H-K	2	11	9	11	8	5
(Australia) M Miao	6	6	12	4
10	(South Korea) Kim K-A	11	11	14	11

Third round
8	(China) Guo Yan	11	4	12	11	8	11
21	(Japan) A Fukuhara	3	11	10	9	11	5
18	(Hong Kong) Song A S	10	11	11	8	11	11
10	(South Korea) Kim K-A	12	8	9	11	8	7

Fourth round
8	(China) Guo Yan	11	11	16	11
18	(Hong Kong) Song A S	6	4	14	8

==== Section 8 ====
First round
13	(Romania) M Steff	11	11	11	12
(Slovenia) P Skabar	4	6	3	10
(France) L Phai Pang	13	9	7	11	7
(Thailand) N Komwong	11	11	11	13	11
(Russia) I Palina	10	11	0	0	0
(South Korea) Lee H-M	12	9	11	11	11
(Indonesia) C Ferliana	11	3	11	6	7	3
19	(Netherlands) J Li	9	11	9	11	11	11
26	(Romania) O Bădescu	11	12	11	11
(Belgium) L Junker	3	10	6	2
(Egypt) B Osman	3	3	3	4
(South Korea) Moon H-J	11	11	11	11
(Dominican Republic) X Wu	11	11	11	11
(Switzerland) M Eggel	3	4	2	6
(Chinese Taipei) Yu M-J	1	3	4	2
2	(China) Wang N	11	11	11	11

Second round
13	(Romania) M Steff	11	11	11	10	11
(Thailand) N Komwong	6	9	8	12	5
(South Korea) Lee H-M	13	5	8	6	11	11
19	(Netherlands) J Li	11	11	11	11	4	13
26	(Romania) O Bădescu	5	9	8	11	6
(South Korea) Moon H-J	11	11	11	9	11
(Dominican Republic) X Wu	9	5	12	11
2	(China) Wang N	11	11	14	13

Third round
13	(Romania) M Steff	6	11	12	9	6
19	(Netherlands) J Li	11	5	14	11	11
(South Korea) Moon H-J	14	4	11	5	14	12	11
2	(China) Wang N	12	11	6	11	12	14	8

Fourth round
19	(Netherlands) J Li	11	11	7	12	9	9	12
(South Korea) Moon H-J	7	9	11	10	11	11	10
