= 2013 World Table Tennis Championships – Women's singles =

Women's singles at the 2013 World Table Tennis Championships
- Venue: Palais Omnisports de Paris-Bercy
- Location: Paris, France
- Dates: 15–19 May
- Final score: 11–8, 4–11, 11–7, 12–10, 6–11, 13–11

Medalists
gold medal	Li Xiaoxia	China
silver medal	Liu Shiwen	China
bronze medal	Ding Ning	China
bronze medal	Zhu Yuling	China

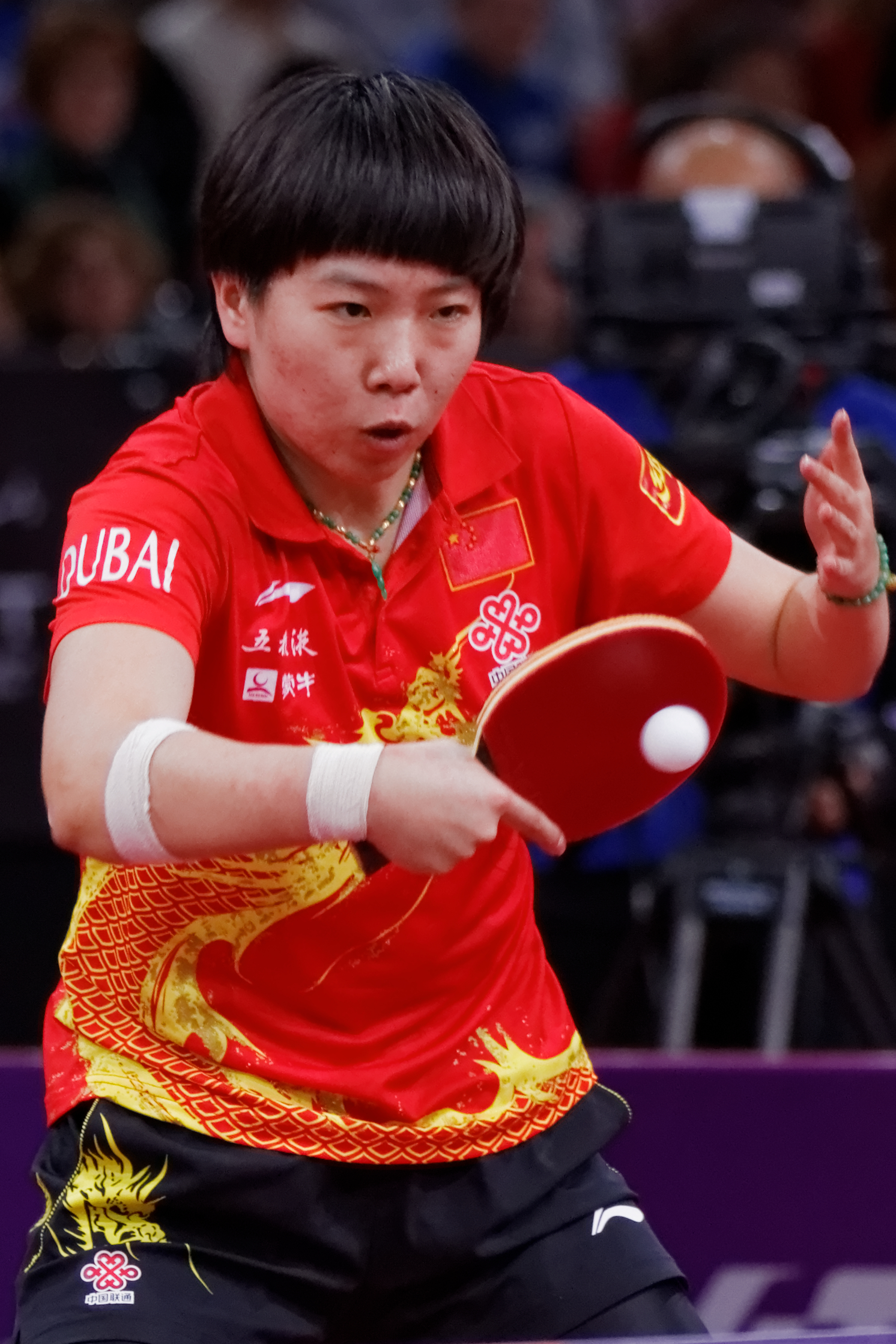
Winner Li Xiaoxia playing at the event

Ding Ning was the defending champion but lost in the semifinals to Li Xiaoxia. Ding Ning had won the last two World Tennis Championships, 2011 and 2012. Li went on to win the title by defeating Liu Shiwen 11–8, 4–11, 11–7, 12–10, 6–11, 13–11 in the final.

== Seeds ==
Singles matches were best of 7 games in qualification matches and best of 7 games in the 128-player sized main draw.

1. (China) Ding Ning (semifinals)
2. (China) Liu Shiwen (final)
3. (China) Li Xiaoxia (champion)
4. (Singapore) Feng Tianwei (quarterfinals)
5. (China) Zhu Yuling (semifinals)
6. (Spain) Shen Yanfei (fourth round)
7. (Japan) Kasumi Ishikawa (third round)
8. (China) Wu Yang (quarterfinals)
9. (China) Chen Meng (fourth round)
10. (Japan) Ai Fukuhara (first round)
11. (Hong Kong) Jiang Huajun (fourth round)
12. (Belarus) Viktoria Pavlovich (second round)
13. (South Korea) Seok Ha-Jung (second round)
14. (Romania) Elizabeta Samara (second round)
15. (South Korea) Yang Ha-Eun (third round)
16. (South Korea) Seo Hyo-Won (fourth round)
17. (Netherlands) Li Jiao (third round)
18. (Czech Republic) Iveta Vacenovská (second round)
19. (Austria) Liu Jia (fourth round)
20. (Singapore) Yu Mengyu (second round)
21. (Chinese Taipei) Cheng I-ching (second round)
22. (Germany) Wu Jiaduo (third round)
23. (Japan) Sayaka Hirano (third round)
24. (Hong Kong) Lee Ho Ching (third round)
25. (Sweden) Matilda Ekholm (third round)
26. (Romania) Daniela Dodean (third round)
27. (Chinese Taipei) Huang Yi-Hua (third round)
28. (North Korea) Ri Myong-Sun (quarterfinals)
29. (Ukraine) Margaryta Pesotska (third round)
30. (Germany) Kristin Silbereisen (third round)
31. (Japan) Hiroko Fujii (third round)
32. (Hungary) Georgina Póta (first round)
33. (France) Xian Yi Fang (third round)
34. (North Korea) Kim Jong (second round)
35. (Germany) Petrissa Solja (first round)
36. (Germany) Irene Ivancan (second round)
37. (Chinese Taipei) Chen Szu-yu (second round)
38. (Japan) Misaki Morizono (second round)
39. (Germany) Zhenqi Barthel (third round)
40. (Luxembourg) Ni Xialian (second round)
41. (Hungary) Petra Lovas (second round)
42. (North Korea) Ri Mi-Gyong (second round)
43. (South Korea) Park Young-Sook (second round)
44. (Poland) Natalia Partyka (second round)
45. (Hong Kong) Ng Wing Nam (second round)
46. (Spain) Sara Ramírez (first round)
47. (Czech Republic) Renáta Štrbíková (second round)
48. (Japan) Shiho Matsudaira (third round)
49. (Ukraine) Tetyana Bilenko (fourth round)
50. (Russia) Yana Noskova (first round)
51. (Hungary) Krisztina Tóth (second round)
52. (United States) Lily Zhang (second round)
53. (United States) Ariel Hsing (first round)
54. (Hungary) Szandra Pergel (second round)
55. (Denmark) Mie Skov (first round)
56. (Romania) Bernadette Szőcs (first round)
57. (Turkey) Melek Hu (quarterfinals)
58. (Thailand) Nanthana Komwong (second round)
59. (Czech Republic) Dana Čechová (second round)
60. (Hong Kong) Doo Hoi Kem (second round)
61. (Serbia) Anamaria Erdelji (first round)
62. (Ukraine) Ganna Gaponova (second round)
63. (Italy) Nikoleta Stefanova (second round)
64. (Russia) Polina Mikhailova (second round)

== Draw ==
=== Key ===
- Q = Qualifier
- w/o = Walkover
- w/d = Withdraw
- r = Retired
- DQ = Disqualified

=== Finals ===
Quarterfinals
1	(China) Ding Ning	11	9	11	11	11
28	(North Korea) Ri Myong-Sun	6	11	8	4	6
8	(China) Wu Yang	12	4	11	4	7
3	(China) Li Xiaoxia	14	11	6	11	11
4	(Singapore) Feng Tianwei	7	5	6	7
5	(China) Zhu Yuling	11	11	11	11
57	(Turkey) Melek Hu	11	5	5	9	5
2	(China) Liu Shiwen	7	11	11	11	11

Semifinals
1	(China) Ding Ning	11	1	11	11	6	8
3	(China) Li Xiaoxia	8	11	4	13	11	11
5	(China) Zhu Yuling	8	11	9	5	8
2	(China) Liu Shiwen	11	9	11	11	11

Final
3	(China) Li Xiaoxia	11	4	11	12	6	13
2	(China) Liu Shiwen	8	11	7	10	11	11

=== Top half ===
==== Section 1 ====
First Round
1	(China) N Ding	11	11	11	11
(Australia) Z Dederko	6	2	5	3
(France) A Abbat	7	11	11	8	8	9
58	(Thailand) N Komwong	11	8	8	11	11	11
63	(Italy) N Stefanova	11	11	11	11
(India) S Kumaresan	4	5	7	9
(China) L Hu	11	12	11	11
32	(Hungary) G Póta	6	10	6	7
21	(Chinese Taipei) I-c Cheng	11	11	2	11	7	11
(Slovakia) B Balážová	4	7	11	5	11	9
(Republic of the Congo) X Han	6	3	6	11
33	(France) YF Xian	11	11	11	13
52	(United States) L Zhang	11	9	9	8	11	11	11
(Malaysia) SK Ng	4	11	11	11	6	5	1
(South Korea) S-H Park	4	11	11	3	11	11
10	(Japan) A Fukuhara	11	6	9	11	8	6

Second Round
1	(China) N Ding	11	11	11	11
58	(Thailand) N Komwong	3	6	3	4
63	(Italy) N Stefanova	5	3	6	7
(China) L Hu	11	11	11	11
21	(Chinese Taipei) I-c Cheng	4	7	11	4	4
33	(France) YF Xian	11	11	3	11	11
52	(United States) L Zhang	10	11	6	7	4
(South Korea) S-H Park	12	7	11	11	11

Third Round
1	(China) N Ding	11	11	11	11
(China) L Hu	4	8	5	2
33	(France) YF Xian	7	11	7	1
(South Korea) S-H Park	11	13	11	11

Fourth Round
1	(China) N Ding	11	11	11	11
(South Korea) S-H Park	8	4	5	7

==== Section 2 ====
First Round
15	(South Korea) H-E Yang	11	11	11	11
(Portugal) A Neves	5	1	4	5
(Russia) A Savelyeva	8	8	9	11	9
54	(Hungary) S Pergel	11	11	11	8	11
37	(Chinese Taipei) S-y Chen	11	10	11	11	11
(Slovenia) A Galič	5	12	6	7	2
(Belarus) K Baravok	7	3	13	9	1
19	(Austria) J Liu	11	11	11	11	11
28	(North Korea) M-S Ri	11	11	12	11
(Brazil) L Silva	5	1	10	6
(Poland) K Grzybowska	11	11	12	9	11	11	9
42	(North Korea) M-G Ri	4	7	14	11	7	13	11
47	(Czech Republic) R Štrbíková	9	13	11	11	11
(Luxembourg) S de Nutte	11	11	8	7	5
(Egypt) N El-Dawlatly	8	2	3	4
7	(Japan) K Ishikawa	11	11	11	11

Second Round
15	(South Korea) H-E Yang	9	10	16	13	11	11
54	(Hungary) S Pergel	11	12	14	11	2	6
37	(Chinese Taipei) S-y Chen	12	4	7	11	11	9
19	(Austria) J Liu	14	11	11	9	9	11
28	(North Korea) M-S Ri	8	13	11	11	11
42	(North Korea) M-G Ri	11	11	8	9	8
47	(Czech Republic) R Štrbíková	11	7	11	9	7	6
7	(Japan) K Ishikawa	7	11	6	11	11	11

Third Round
15	(South Korea) H-E Yang	7	13	11	11	10	7	5
19	(Austria) J Liu	11	11	6	5	12	11	11
28	(North Korea) M-S Ri	12	11	11	11
7	(Japan) K Ishikawa	10	8	9	5

Fourth Round
19	(Austria) J Liu	4	5	8	7
28	(North Korea) M-S Ri	11	11	11	11

==== Section 3 ====
First Round
8	(China) Y Wu	11	11	11	11
(Luxembourg) T Gonderinger	6	2	5	2
(Czech Republic) K Pěnkavová	11	11	9	11	11
55	(Denmark) M Skov	5	9	11	5	6
36	(Germany) I Ivancan	5	7	11	11	10	11	11
(England) J Parker	11	11	9	5	12	5	9
(Thailand) A Muangsuk	9	4	9	11	11
22	(Germany) J Wu	11	11	11	9	13
27	(Chinese Taipei) Y-H Huang	11	12	11	11	9	11
(Serbia) M Molnar	7	14	9	7	11	9
(France) L Gasnier	13	4	8	5	3
40	(Luxembourg) X Ni	11	11	11	11	11
56	(Romania) B Szőcs	10	1	10	7
(North Korea) H-S Kim	12	11	12	11
(Belarus) A Arlouskaya	4	8	7	7
14	(Romania) E Samara	11	11	11	11

Second Round
8	(China) Y Wu	11	11	11	11
(Czech Republic) K Pěnkavová	8	4	4	1
36	(Germany) I Ivancan	11	6	10	8	5
22	(Germany) J Wu	6	11	12	11	11
27	(Chinese Taipei) Y-H Huang	5	12	11	11	10	11	11
40	(Luxembourg) X Ni	11	10	6	13	12	8	8
(North Korea) H-S Kim	9	11	11	8	11	11
14	(Romania) E Samara	11	8	7	11	5	6

Third Round
8	(China) Y Wu	11	11	11	11
22	(Germany) J Wu	3	5	4	7
27	(Chinese Taipei) Y-H Huang	6	6	9	8
(North Korea) H-S Kim	11	11	11	11

Fourth Round
8	(China) Y Wu	11	11	11	11
(North Korea) H-S Kim	2	9	4	7

==== Section 4 ====
First Round
9	(China) M Chen	11	11	11	11
(France) M Berho	4	7	7	5
(Chinese Taipei) H-y Liu	11	6	8	7	8
34	(North Korea) J Kim	7	11	11	11	11
45	(Hong Kong) WN Ng	11	11	11	10	11
(India) M Patkar	8	4	8	12	3
(Singapore) IS Li	11	3	5	7	11	6
29	(Ukraine) M Pesotska	9	11	11	11	7	11
23	(Japan) S Hirano	11	11	11	11
(Poland) A Szymańska	5	8	6	8
(Hungary) D Madarász	11	11	11	8	11
61	(Serbia) A Erdelji	9	7	5	11	5
51	(Hungary) K Tóth	11	15	11	11
(Hong Kong) CW Li	5	13	7	5
(Lithuania) R Paškauskienė	7	4	11	3	4
3	(China) X Li	11	11	8	11	11

Second Round
9	(China) M Chen	11	11	11	11
34	(North Korea) J Kim	8	8	4	5
45	(Hong Kong) WN Ng	11	11	10	7	5	15	7
29	(Ukraine) M Pesotska	6	6	12	11	11	13	11
23	(Japan) S Hirano	14	11	11	11
(Hungary) D Madarász	12	6	8	6
51	(Hungary) K Tóth	7	2	2	4
3	(China) X Li	11	11	11	11

Third Round
9	(China) M Chen	11	11	11	11
29	(Ukraine) M Pesotska	8	6	8	5
23	(Japan) S Hirano	4	6	4	6
3	(China) X Li	11	11	11	11

Fourth Round
9	(China) M Chen	6	6	3	9
3	(China) X Li	11	11	11	11

=== Bottom half ===
==== Section 5 ====
First Round
4	(Singapore) T Feng	4	11	11	11	11
(Romania) I Necula	11	8	6	4	6
(Moldova) O Bliznet	6	4	2	9
38	(Japan) M Morizono	11	11	11	11
48	(Japan) S Matsudaira	11	8	15	7	7	11	12
(Poland) M Pietkiewicz	6	11	13	11	11	4	10
(Thailand) S Sawettabut	4	9	3	8
20	(Singapore) M Yu	11	11	11	11
31	(Japan) H Fujii	11	12	11	11
(Greece) M Christoforaki	5	10	4	7
(Chinese Taipei) C-h Lin	9	12	6	11	3	12	11
53	(United States) A Hsing	11	10	11	6	11	10	4
49	(Ukraine) T Bilenko	12	11	11	11
(France) M Migot	10	8	4	5
(Romania) C Postoaca	8	11	4	4	5
13	(South Korea) H-J Seok	11	6	11	11	11

Second Round
4	(Singapore) T Feng	11	4	6	11	11	11
38	(Japan) M Morizono	8	11	11	8	8	8
48	(Japan) S Matsudaira	11	12	11	11
20	(Singapore) M Yu	8	10	8	9
31	(Japan) H Fujii	11	11	11	7	6	11
(Chinese Taipei) C-h Lin	8	7	9	11	11	2
49	(Ukraine) T Bilenko	8	11	13	11	9	11	11
13	(South Korea) H-J Seok	11	9	15	8	11	6	8

Third Round
4	(Singapore) T Feng	11	11	12	11
48	(Japan) S Matsudaira	6	6	10	3
31	(Japan) H Fujii	5	10	11	11	9	10
49	(Ukraine) T Bilenko	11	12	8	8	11	12

Fourth Round
4	(Singapore) T Feng	11	11	9	7	11	11
49	(Ukraine) T Bilenko	8	6	11	11	8	9

==== Section 6 ====
First Round
11	(Hong Kong) H Jiang	11	11	10	9	12	11
(Lithuania) L Misikonytė	3	5	12	11	10	8
(Wales) N Owen	7	6	4	11	6
60	(Hong Kong) HK Doo	11	11	11	9	11
62	(Ukraine) G Gaponova	12	11	11	11
(Chile) P Vega	10	6	3	7
(Russia) M Dolgikh	7	11	9	11	3	11	7
30	(Germany) K Silbereisen	11	7	11	9	11	6	11
24	(Hong Kong) HC Lee	7	11	11	11	11
(India) M Das	11	5	5	6	5
(Egypt) D Meshref	4	8	11	11	5	11	11
35	(Germany) P Solja	11	11	9	6	11	3	9
43	(South Korea) Y-S Park	11	14	11	11
(Hong Kong) M Guan	7	12	4	9
(Russia) E Troshneva	7	6	11	5	9
5	(China) Y Zhu	11	11	8	11	11

Second Round
11	(Hong Kong) H Jiang	13	11	11	11
60	(Hong Kong) HK Doo	11	9	6	3
62	(Ukraine) G Gaponova	9	6	12	3	8
30	(Germany) K Silbereisen	11	11	10	11	11
24	(Hong Kong) HC Lee	6	11	11	11	11
(Egypt) D Meshref	11	7	7	4	8
43	(South Korea) Y-S Park	7	3	3	6
5	(China) Y Zhu	11	11	11	11

Third Round
11	(Hong Kong) H Jiang	11	11	12	11
30	(Germany) K Silbereisen	9	8	10	7
24	(Hong Kong) HC Lee	3	8	11	11	9	7
5	(China) Y Zhu	11	11	9	9	11	11

Fourth Round
11	(Hong Kong) H Jiang	7	11	8	7	11	19
5	(China) Y Zhu	11	7	11	11	9	21

==== Section 7 ====
First Round
6	(Spain) Y Shen	11	11	11	11
(Brazil) J Yamada	9	9	2	2
(South Korea) E-C Yoo	6	6	9	4
44	(Poland) N Partyka	11	11	11	11
64	(Russia) P Mikhailova	11	11	8	11	11
(Bulgaria) K Gatinska	8	8	11	9	7
(Mexico) Y Silva	9	8	14	5	11	5
26	(Romania) D Dodean	11	11	12	11	8	11
25	(Sweden) M Ekholm	3	14	4	11	11	11
(Croatia) Y Tian	11	12	11	9	5	7
(Brazil) C Kumahara	11	11	11	11
50	(Russia) Y Noskova	7	6	9	8
57	(Turkey) M Hu	12	9	9	11	11	7	11
(France) C Grundisch	10	11	11	7	9	11	9
(Japan) M Matsuzawa	11	4	6	10	7
12	(Belarus) V Pavlovich	4	11	11	12	11

Second Round
6	(Spain) Y Shen	6	11	11	11	5	11
44	(Poland) N Partyka	11	7	9	5	11	6
64	(Russia) P Mikhailova	11	7	11	4	9	11	9
26	(Romania) D Dodean	7	11	8	11	11	9	11
25	(Sweden) M Ekholm	11	12	11	11
(Brazil) C Kumahara	5	10	9	4
57	(Turkey) M Hu	16	11	11	9	12	8	11
12	(Belarus) V Pavlovich	18	6	9	11	10	11	6

Third Round
6	(Spain) Y Shen	11	6	11	11	8	11
26	(Romania) D Dodean	9	11	2	8	11	8
25	(Sweden) M Ekholm	8	9	7	15	11	6
57	(Turkey) M Hu	11	11	11	13	7	11

Fourth Round
6	(Spain) Y Shen	11	15	9	11	5	6
57	(Turkey) M Hu	6	13	11	13	11	11

==== Section 8 ====
First Round
16	(South Korea) H-W Seo	11	13	11	11	11
(Croatia) L Rakovac	9	15	7	3	5
(Spain) G Dvorak	8	4	6	5
59	(Czech Republic) D Čechová	11	11	11	11
46	(Spain) S Ramírez	11	11	11	8	11	9
(Australia) JF Lay	13	8	13	11	7	11
(Czech Republic) H Matelova	10	11	5	7	6
17	(Netherlands) J Li	12	6	11	11	11
18	(Czech Republic) I Vacenovská	2	11	13	11	11
(Belarus) A Privalova	11	4	11	5	4
(South Korea) Y-J Jo	11	5	10	6	11	11	11
39	(Germany) Z Barthel	8	11	12	11	9	9	13
41	(Hungary) P Lovas	11	11	11	16
(France) E Lennon	4	9	9	14
(England) K Sibley	3	2	1	8
2	(China) S Liu	11	11	11	11

Second Round
16	(South Korea) H-W Seo	11	8	11	11	11
59	(Czech Republic) D Čechová	7	11	5	9	7
(Australia) JF Lay	4	9	11	2	11	7
17	(Netherlands) J Li	11	11	8	11	9	11
18	(Czech Republic) I Vacenovská	7	9	11	9	13
39	(Germany) Z Barthel	11	11	3	11	15
41	(Hungary) P Lovas	3	2	2	6
2	(China) S Liu	11	11	11	11

Third Round
16	(South Korea) H-W Seo	11	11	6	8	11	11
17	(Netherlands) J Li	8	8	11	11	8	6
39	(Germany) Z Barthel	3	8	8	3
2	(China) S Liu	11	11	11	11

Fourth Round
16	(South Korea) H-W Seo	4	7	7	5
2	(China) S Liu	11	11	11	11
