= Table tennis at the 2008 Summer Olympics – Women's team =

Table tennis – women's team at the Games of the XXIX Olympiad
- Venue: Peking University Gymnasium
- Date: August 13 to August 17, 2008
- Competitors: 48 from 16 nations
- Teams: 16

Medalists
1st place, gold medalist(s)		Guo Yue; Wang Nan; Zhang Yining	China
2nd place, silver medalist(s)		Feng Tianwei; Li Jiawei; Wang Yuegu	Singapore
3rd place, bronze medalist(s)		Dang Ye-Seo; Kim Kyung-Ah; Park Mi-Young	South Korea

The women's team table tennis event was part of the table tennis programme and took place between August 13 and 17 at the Peking University Gymnasium. Teams consisted of three members. The sixteen teams were divided into four groups of four teams each, playing a round-robin within their pool. The top team in each pool advanced to the semifinals, with the second-place team from each group going to the bronze medal playoffs. The two semifinal winners met in the gold medal match, while the two semifinal losers each played against one of the winners from the bronze medal playoffs, with the winners of those games meeting in the bronze medal match.

Each match consisted of up to five games, with the first team to win three being declared the winner. The first two games in each match were singles, the third was doubles, and the final two were singles again. Each team member competed in two of the five games, according to a set rotation.

== Schedule ==
All times are China Standard Time (UTC+8).

Dates	Start time	Round
August 13	10:00	Group A and B 1st group round (1–3, 2–4)
August 13	14:30	Group C and D 1st group round (1–3, 2–4)
August 13	19:30	Group A and B 2nd group round (1–4, 2–3)
August 14	10:00	Group C and D 2nd group round (1–4, 2–3)
August 14	14:30	Group A and B 3rd group round (1–2, 3–4)
August 14	19:30	Group C and D 3rd group round (1–2, 3–4)
August 15	9:00	Bronze playoff 1st round
August 15	14:30	Semifinals
August 15	19:30	Semifinals
August 16	10:00	Bronze playoff 2nd round
August 17	14:30	Bronze medal match
August 17	19:30	Gold medal match

== Seeds ==
Team ranking list was produced on the basis of the ITTF July 2008 world ranking. Only the players qualified from each team were taking into consideration to establish the ranking. Teams were drawn into four groups on August 7. Injured or sick athletes could be replaced by alternates. The alternates could only compete in the team event, the replaced athletes were not allowed to compete again at the 2008 Summer Olympics.

Rank	Group	Team	Athletes (world ranking in July 2008)			Alternate athletes
1	A	China	Zhang Yining (1)	Guo Yue (2)	Wang Nan (5)	Li Xiaoxia (3)
2	B	Singapore	Li Jiawei (6)	Wang Yuegu (7)	Feng Tianwei (9)	Sun Beibei (24)
3	C	Hong Kong	Tie Ya Na (10)	Lin Ling (14)	Lau Sui Fei (35)	Yu Kwok See (123)
4	D	South Korea	Kim Kyung-ah (11)	Park Mi-young (21)	Dang Ye-seo (26)	Moon Hyun-jung (64)
5	D	Japan	Ai Fukuhara (12)	Sayaka Hirano (19)	Haruna Fukuoka (27)	Hiroko Fujii (53)
6	C	Germany	Wu Jiaduo (23)	Elke Schall (43)	Zhenqi Barthel (78)	Amelie Solja (300)
7	B	Netherlands	Li Jiao (15)	Li Jie (45)	Elena Timina (115)	
8	A	Austria	Liu Jia (17)	Li Qiangbing (58)	Veronika Heine (207)	
9	B	United States	Wang Chen (20)	Gao Jun (25)	Crystal Huang (245)	Jacqueline Lee (291)
10	A	Croatia	Tamara Boroš (28)	Sandra Paović (63)	Andrea Bakula (131)	Cornelia Vaida (100)
11	D	Spain	Shen Yanfei (33)	Zhu Fang (76)	Galia Dvorak (120)	
12	C	Poland	Li Qian (31)	Xu Jie (90)	Natalia Partyka (147)	
13	C	Romania	Daniela Dodean (47)	Elizabeta Samara (61)	Iulia Necula (202)	
14	D	Australia	Jian Fang Lay (143)	Miao Miao (156)	Stephanie Sang (191)	
15	A	Dominican Republic	Wu Xue (49)	Lian Qian (187)	Johenny Valdez (704)	
16	B	Nigeria	Olufunke Oshonaike (269)	Bose Kaffo (312)	Cecilia Offiong (371)	

== Group round ==
=== Group A ===
Team	Pts	Pld	W	L	GW	GL	Qualification
China	6	3	3	0	9	0	Qualified for the semifinals
Austria	5	3	2	1	6	3	Qualified for the bronze medal playoff
Croatia	4	3	1	2	3	7	
Dominican Republic	3	3	0	3	1	9	

August 13, 2008; 10:00	China	3–0	Croatia	Duration: 58min

	Individual matches
Zhang Yining	3–0	Tamara Boros	11–4, 11–2, 11–6
Wang Nan	3–1	Andrea Bakula	10–12, 11–5, 11–4, 11–9
Guo Yue / Zhang Yining	3–0	Sandra Paovic / Andrea Bakula	11–3, 11–3, 11–2

August 13, 2008; 10:00	Austria	3–0	Dominican Republic	Duration: 1h 4m

	Individual matches
Liu Jia	3–0	Wu Xue	14–12, 11–6, 11–9
Li Qiangbing	3–1	Lian Qian	11–9, 11–7, 9–11, 11–4
Veronika Heine / Li Qiangbing	3–0	Johenny Valdez / Lian Qian	11–8, 11–9, 11–4

August 13, 2008; 19:30	China	3–0	Dominican Republic	Duration: 47min

	Individual matches
Zhang Yining	3–0	Lian Qian	11–9, 11–3, 11–7
Guo Yue	3–0	Wu Xue	11–2, 11–8, 11–4
Wang Nan / Zhang Yining	3–0	Johenny Valdez / Lian Qian	11–4, 11–2, 11–2

August 13, 2008; 19:30	Croatia	0–3	Austria	Duration: 1h 44min

	Individual matches
Tamara Boros	2–3	Liu Jia	11–9, 8–11, 12–10, 6–11, 5–11
Andrea Bakula	1–3	Li Qiangbing	9–11, 11–5, 10–12, 6–11
Sandra Paovic / Andrea Bakula	2–3	Veronika Heine / Liu Jia	11–7, 8–11, 9–11, 11–9, 6–11

August 14, 2008; 14:30	China	3–0	Austria	Duration: 56min

	Individual matches
Guo Yue	3–1	Li Qiangbing	11–7, 11–7, 9–11, 11–4
Wang Nan	3–0	Veronika Heine	12–10, 11–6, 11–1
Zhang Yining / Guo Yue	3–0	Liu Jia / Veronika Heine	11–3, 11–3, 11–7

August 14, 2008; 14:30	Croatia	3–1	Dominican Republic	Duration: 1h 3min

	Individual matches
Sandra Paovic	3–0	Lian Qian	11–6, 11–4, 11–4
Andrea Bakula	0–3	Wu Xue	6–11, 6–11, 5–11
Tamara Boros / Andrea Bakula	3–0	Johenny Valdez / Lian Qian	11–4, 11–8, 11–2
Sandra Paovic	3–0	Johenny Valdez	11–6, 11–5, 11–4

=== Group B ===
Team	Pts	Pld	W	L	GW	GL	Qualification
Singapore	6	3	3	0	9	0	Qualified for the semifinals
United States	5	3	2	1	6	4	Qualified for the bronze medal playoff
Netherlands	4	3	1	2	4	6	
Nigeria	3	3	0	3	0	9	

August 13, 2008; 10:00	Singapore	3–0	United States	Duration: 1h 1min

	Individual matches
Wang Yuegu	3–1	Gao Jun	11–6, 7–11, 11–8, 11–4
Feng Tianwei	3–1	Wang Chen	11–2, 8–11, 11–4, 15–13
Li Jiawei / Wang Yuegu	3–0	Crystal Huang / Gao Jun	11–5, 11–9, 11–7

August 13, 2008; 10:00	Netherlands	3–0	Nigeria	Duration: 1h

	Individual matches
Li Jiao	3–0	Bose Kaffo	11–7, 11–2, 11–7
Li Jie	3–1	Cecilia Offiong	10–12, 11–9, 11–2, 11–6
Elena Timina / Li Jie	3–1	Olufunke Oshonaike / Cecilia Offiong	11–4, 11–8, 10–12, 11–7

August 13, 2008; 19:30	Singapore	3–0	Nigeria	Duration: 45min

	Individual matches
Feng Tianwei	3–0	Bose Kaffo	11–3, 11–4, 11–2
Li Jiawei	3–0	Cecilia Offiong	11–7, 11–7, 11–6
Wang Yuegu / Li Jiawei	3–1	Olufunke Oshonaike / Cecilia Offiong	13–15, 11–5, 11–5, 11–5

August 13, 2008; 19:30	Netherlands	1–3	United States	Duration: 1h 56min

	Individual matches
Li Jiao	2–3	Wang Chen	11–6, 9–11, 11–4, 4–11, 3–11
Li Jie	0–3	Gao Jun	5–11, 4–11, 4–11
Elena Timina / Li Jie	3–1	Crystal Huang / Wang Chen	11–9, 9–11, 11–6, 11–9
Elena Timina	0–3	Gao Jun	7–11, 5–11, 7–11

August 14, 2008; 14:30	Singapore	3–0	Netherlands	Duration: 1h 36min

	Individual matches
Feng Tianwei	3–2	Li Jiao	11–9, 10–12, 10–12, 11–5, 11–8
Li Jiawei	3–0	Elena Timina	14–12, 11–2, 11–3
Wang Yuegu / Li Jiawei	3–2	Li Jie / Elena Timina	11–8, 5–11, 6–11, 11–6, 11–7

August 14, 2008; 14:30	United States	3–0	Nigeria	Duration: 38min

	Individual matches
Gao Jun	3–0	Bose Kaffo	11–1, 11–2, 11–6
Wang Chen	3–0	Cecilia Offiong	11–5, 11–3, 11–4
Crystal Huang / Gao Jun	3–0	Olufunke Oshonaike / Cecilia Offiong	11–5, 11–9, 11–8

=== Group C ===
Team	Pts	Pld	W	L	GW	GL	Qualification
Hong Kong	6	3	3	0	9	0	Qualified for the semifinals
Romania	5	3	2	1	6	5	Qualified for the bronze medal playoff
Poland	4	3	1	2	5	7	
Germany	3	3	0	3	1	9	

August 13, 2008; 14:30	Hong Kong	3–0	Poland	Duration: 1h 23min

	Individual matches
Lin Ling	3–0	Li Qian	11–7, 11–9, 11–7
Tie Ya Na	3–2	Natalia Partyka	8–11, 11–9, 11–6, 5–11, 11–4
Lau Sui Fei / Lin Ling	3–0	Xu Jie / Natalia Partyka	11–6, 11–6, 12–10

August 13, 2008; 14:30	Germany	0–3	Romania	Duration: 1h 15min

	Individual matches
Wu Jiaduo	0–3	Daniela Dodean	9–11, 8–11, 7–11
Elke Schall	0–3	Elizabeta Samara	8–11, 6–11, 9–11
Zhenqi Barthel / Elke Schall	1–3	Iulia Necula / Elizabeta Samara	10–12, 11–9, 4–11, 10–12

August 14, 2008; 10:00	Hong Kong	3–0	Romania	Duration: 1h 20min

	Individual matches
Lin Ling	3–1	Daniela Dodean	11–7, 11–5, 10–12, 11–7
Tie Ya Na	3–0	Elizabeta Samara	11–6, 12–10, 11–4
Lau Sui Fei / Lin Ling	3–2	Iulia Necula / Elizabeta Samara	11–4, 10–12, 11–7, 1–11, 11–8

August 14, 2008; 10:00	Germany	1–3	Poland	Duration: 1h 43min

	Individual matches
Wu Jiaduo	3–1	Natalia Partyka	11–13, 12–10, 11–8, 11–4
Zhenqi Barthel	0–3	Li Qian	3–11, 4–11, 7–11
Elke Schall / Wu Jiaduo	2–3	Xu Jie / Natalia Partyka	3–11, 3–11, 11–7, 11–7, 4–11
Zhenqi Barthel	0–3	Xu Jie	3–11, 12–14, 7–11

August 14, 2008; 19:30	Hong Kong	3–0	Germany	Duration: 1h 19min

	Individual matches
Tie Ya Na	3–0	Zhenqi Barthel	11–2, 13–11, 14–12
Lin Ling	3–1	Elke Schall	11–5, 10–12, 18–16, 11–8
Lau Sui Fei / Lin Ling	3–0	Wu Jiaduo / Elke Schall	11–3, 16–14, 11–7

August 14, 2008; 19:30	Poland	2–3	Romania	Duration: 2h 33min

	Individual matches
Natalia Partyka	2–3	Daniela Dodean	11–9, 11–7, 7–11, 6–11, 6–11
Li Qian	0–3	Elizabeta Samara	10–12, 9–11, 9–11
Xu Jie / Natalia Partyka	3–1	Iulia Necula / Elizabeta Samara	11–7, 10–12, 11–6, 11–7
Li Qian	3–1	Iulia Necula	5–11, 11–6, 11–5, 11–4
Xu Jie	2–3	Daniela Dodean	7–11, 11–9, 7–11, 14–12, 9–11

=== Group D ===
Team	Pts	Pld	W	L	GW	GL	Qualification
South Korea	6	3	3	0	9	0	Qualified for the semifinals
Japan	5	3	2	1	6	5	Qualified for the bronze medal playoff
Spain	4	3	1	2	5	6	
Australia	3	3	0	3	0	9	

August 13, 2008; 14:30	South Korea	3–0	Spain	Duration: 1h 40min

	Individual matches
Kim Kyung-ah	3–0	Galia Dvorak	12–10, 11–8, 12–10
Dang Ye-seo	3–0	Shen Yanfei	11–4, 11–9, 11–7
Park Mi-young / Kim Kyung-ah	3–2	Zhu Fang / Shen Yanfei	5–11, 9–11, 11–6, 11–8, 11–5

August 13, 2008; 14:30	Japan	3–0	Australia	Duration: 1h 15min

	Individual matches
Sayaka Hirano	3–0	Jian Fang Lay	11–7, 11–6, 11–5
Ai Fukuhara	3–2	Miao Miao	11–9, 9–11, 11–9, 6–11, 11–4
Haruna Fukuoka / Sayaka Hirano	3–1	Stephanie Sang / Miao Miao	11–5, 11–2, 3–11, 11–3

August 14, 2008; 10:00	South Korea	3–0	Australia	Duration: 1h 16min

	Individual matches
Park Mi-young	3–1	Miao Miao	11–6, 11–4, 15–17, 11–3
Dang Ye-seo	3–0	Stephanie Sang	11–5, 11–7, 14–12
Kim Kyung-ah / Park Mi-young	3–0	Jian Fang Lay / Miao Miao	11–6, 11–6, 11–9

August 14, 2008; 10:00	Japan	3–2	Spain	Duration: 2h 46min

	Individual matches
Ai Fukuhara	2–3	Shen Yanfei	7–11, 11–6, 3–11, 11–8, 3–11
Sayaka Hirano	3–1	Zhu Fang	11–8, 13–11, 8–11, 11–4
Haruna Fukuoka / Sayaka Hirano	3–0	Galia Dvorak / Zhu Fang	11–5, 11–1, 11–4
Haruna Fukuoka	2–3	Shen Yanfei	12–10, 11–7, 7–11, 9–11, 15–17
Ai Fukuhara	3–2	Galia Dvorak	11–6, 11–6, 6–11, 7–11, 11–7

August 14, 2008; 19:30	South Korea	3–0	Japan	Duration: 1h 59min

	Individual matches
Dang Ye-seo	3–0	Ai Fukuhara	11–8, 11–6, 11–5
Kim Kyung-ah	3–1	Sayaka Hirano	11–6, 17–15, 4–11, 11–8
Park Mi-young / Kim Kyung-ah	3–2	Haruna Fukuoka / Sayaka Hirano	11–6, 6–11, 6–11, 11–6, 11–9

August 14, 2008; 19:30	Spain	3–0	Australia	Duration: 1h 3min

	Individual matches
Shen Yanfei	3–0	Jian Fang Lay	11–8, 12–10, 11–4
Galia Dvorak	3–1	Miao Miao	11–4, 11–8, 5–11, 11–4
Zhu Fang / Galia Dvorak	3–0	Stephanie Sang / Miao Miao	13–11, 11–8, 11–7

== Final stage ==
=== Bracket ===
==== Finals ====
Semi-finals
A1	China	3	3	3
C1	Hong Kong	0	0	0
B1	Singapore	3	2	3	0	3
D1	South Korea	0	3	0	3	1

Gold Medal Match
A1	China	3	3	3
B1	Singapore	1	1	0

==== Bronze medal playoff ====
Bronze Play-off Round 1
B2	United States	1	3	3	3
C2	Romania	3	0	1	0
A2	Austria	1	1	1
D2	Japan	3	3	3

Bronze Play-off Round 2
D1	South Korea	3	3	3
B2	United States	1	2	2
C1	Hong Kong	3	2	2	3	0
D2	Japan	0	3	3	1	3

Bronze Medal Match
D1	South Korea	3	3	3
D2	Japan	1	1	0

=== Bronze playoff round 1 ===
August 15, 2008; 09:00	Japan	3–0	Austria	Duration: 1h 28min

	Individual matches
Ai Fukuhara	3–1	Liu Jia	11–7, 8–11, 11–9, 11–7
Sayaka Hirano	3–1	Li Qiangbing	9–11, 11–7, 11–9, 11–6
Haruna Fukuoka / Sayaka Hirano	3–1	Veronika Heine / Li Qiangbing	11–6, 11–8, 9–11, 11–7

August 15, 2008; 09:00	Romania	1–3	United States	Duration: 1h 47min

	Individual matches
Elizabeta Samara	3–1	Wang Chen	11–9, 6–11, 11–7, 11–9
Daniela Dodean	0–3	Gao Jun	7–11, 6–11, 6–11
Iulia Necula / Elizabeta Samara	1–3	Crystal Huang / Gao Jun	8–11, 7–11, 18–16, 7–11
Iulia Necula	0–3	Wang Chen	5–11, 6–11, 2–11

=== Semifinals ===
August 15, 2008; 14:30	South Korea	2–3	Singapore	Duration: 3h 13min

	Individual matches
Dang Ye-seo	0–3	Feng Tianwei	5–11, 5–11, 2–11
Kim Kyung-ah	3–2	Li Jiawei	5–11, 11–8, 9–11, 11–6, 11–9
Park Mi-young / Kim Kyung-ah	0–3	Wang Yuegu / Li Jiawei	7–11, 6–11, 9–11
Dang Ye-seo	3–0	Wang Yuegu	11–8, 14–12, 11–9
Park Mi-young	1–3	Feng Tianwei	7–11, 10–12, 11–3, 9–11

August 15, 2008; 19:30	China	3–0	Hong Kong	Duration: 52min

	Individual matches
Zhang Yining	3–0	Tie Ya Na	11–7, 11–4, 11–3
Guo Yue	3–0	Lin Ling	11–7, 12–10, 11–4
Wang Nan / Zhang Yining	3–0	Lau Sui Fei / Lin Ling	11–4, 11–9, 11–4

=== Bronze playoff round 2 ===
August 16, 2008; 10:00	Hong Kong	2–3	Japan	Duration: 2h 37min

	Individual matches
Tie Ya Na	3–0	Haruna Fukuoka	11–2, 12–10, 12–10
Lin Ling	2–3	Ai Fukuhara	11–9, 14–12, 5–11, 8–11, 8–11
Lau Sui Fei / Lin Ling	2–3	Sayaka Hirano / Ai Fukuhara	11–7, 11–9, 7–11, 8–11, 9–11
Lau Sui Fei	3–1	Haruna Fukuoka	11–8, 11–2, 7–11, 12–10
Tie Ya Na	0–3	Sayaka Hirano	10–12, 6–11, 8–11

August 16, 2008; 10:00	United States	0–3	South Korea	Duration: 2h 15min

	Individual matches
Wang Chen	1–3	Kim Kyung-ah	6–11, 11–9, 8–11, 13–15
Gao Jun	2–3	Dang Ye-seo	11–7, 10–12, 9–11, 11–8, 8–11
Crystal Huang / Gao Jun	2–3	Park Mi-young / Kim Kyung-ah	12–10, 5–11, 11–4, 7–11, 5–11

=== Bronze medal match ===
August 17, 2008; 14:30	Japan	0–3	South Korea	Duration: 1h 46min

	Individual matches
Sayaka Hirano	1–3	Kim Kyung-ah	9–11, 4–11, 11–7, 10–12
Ai Fukuhara	1–3	Dang Ye-seo	4–11, 11–13, 11–7, 3–11
Haruna Fukuoka / Sayaka Hirano	0–3	Park Mi-young / Kim Kyung-ah	6–11, 8–11, 11–13

=== Gold medal match ===
August 17, 2008; 19:30	China	3–0	Singapore	Duration: 1h 32min

	Individual matches
Wang Nan	3–1	Feng Tianwei	9–11, 11–3, 11–8, 11–6
Zhang Yining	3–1	Li Jiawei	9–11, 11–3, 11–4, 11–7
Guo Yue / Zhang Yining	3–0	Wang Yuegu / Li Jiawei	11–8, 11–5, 11–6
