= 2010 European Table Tennis Championships =

- Date: 11 – 19 Oct
- Location: Ostrava, Czech Republic
- Venue: ČEZ Aréna
- European Table Tennis Championships

The 2010 European Table Tennis Championships were held in Ostrava, Czech Republic from 11–19 October 2010. The venue for the competition was ČEZ Aréna.

== Medal summary ==
=== Men's events ===
Event	Gold	Silver	Bronze
Team	Germany; Timo Boll; Dimitrij Ovtcharov; Patrick Baum; Christian Süß	Belarus; Vladimir Samsonov; Pavel Platonov; Evgueni Chtchetinine	France; Adrien Mattenet; Christophe Legoût; Emmanuel Lebesson Czech Republic; Dmitrij Prokopcov; Petr Korbel; Josef Šimončík
Singles	Timo Boll (GER)	Patrick Baum (GER)	Christian Süß (GER) Werner Schlager (AUT)
Doubles	Timo Boll (GER); Christian Süß (GER)	Kasper Sternberg (DEN); Jonathan Groth (DEN)	Jens Lundqvist (SWE); Pär Gerell (SWE) Kou Lei (UKR); Yevhen Pryshchepa (UKR)

=== Women's events ===
Event	Gold	Silver	Bronze
Team	Netherlands; Li Jiao; Li Jie; Linda Creemers	Romania; Daniela Dodean; Elizabeta Samara; Iulia Necula	Belarus; Veronika Pavlovich; Viktoria Pavlovich; Aleksandra Privalova Poland; Li Qian; Xu Jie; Natalia Partyka
Singles	Viktoria Pavlovich (BLR)	Liu Jia (AUT)	Melek Hu (TUR) Rūta Paškauskienė (LIT)
Doubles	Rūta Paškauskienė (LIT); Oksana Fadeyeva (RUS)	Li Jie (NED); Elena Timina (NED)	Georgina Póta (HUN); Krisztina Tóth (HUN) Daniela Dodean (ROU); Elizabeta Samara (ROU)
