= 2008 European Table Tennis Championships =

- Date: 4 – 12 Oct
- Location: St. Petersburg, Russia
- Venue: Saint-Petersburg Sports and Concert Complex
- European Table Tennis Championships

The 2008 European Table Tennis Championships were held in St. Petersburg, Russia from 4–12 October 2008. The venue for the competition was Saint-Petersburg Sports and Concert Complex.

== Medal summary ==
=== Men's events ===
Event	Gold	Silver	Bronze
Team	Germany; Timo Boll; Dimitrij Ovtcharov; Christian Süß; Bastian Steger; Patrick Baum	Belarus; Vladimir Samsonov; Evgueni Chtchetinine; Vitaliy Nehvedovich	Belgium; Jean-Michel Saive; Martin Bratanov; Yannick Vostes; Benjamin Rogiers; Kilomo Vitta Austria; Chen Weixing; Werner Schlager; Robert Gardos; Daniel Habesohn; Bernhard Presslmayer
Singles	Timo Boll (GER)	Vladimir Samsonov (BLR)	Robert Gardos (AUT) Werner Schlager (AUT)
Doubles	Timo Boll (GER); Christian Süß (GER)	Werner Schlager (AUT); Trinko Keen (NED)	Marcos Freitas (POR); Tiago Apolónia (POR) Robert Svensson (SWE); Jon Persson (SWE)

=== Women's events ===
Event	Gold	Silver	Bronze
Team	Netherlands; Li Jiao; Li Jie; Elena Timina; Linda Creemers; Carla Nouwen	Hungary; Li Bin; Krisztina Tóth; Georgina Póta; Petra Lovas	Romania; Daniela Dodean; Elizabeta Samara; Iulia Necula; Ioana Ghemeş; Mariana Stoian Croatia; Tamara Boroš; Sandra Paović; Cornelia Vaida; Andrea Bakula
Singles	Rūta Paškauskienė (LIT)	Liu Jia (AUT)	Wenling Tan Monfardini (ITA) Krisztina Tóth (HUN)
Doubles	Krisztina Tóth (HUN); Georgina Póta (HUN)	Wenling Tan Monfardini (ITA); Nikoleta Stefanova (ITA)	Veronika Pavlovich (BLR); Oksana Fadeyeva (RUS) Xu Jie (POL); Natalia Partyka (POL)
