= 2009 European Table Tennis Championships =

- Date: 13 – 20 Sep
- Location: Stuttgart, Germany
- Venue: Porsche-Arena
- European Table Tennis Championships

The 2009 European Table Tennis Championships were held in Stuttgart, Germany from 13–20 October 2009. Venue for the competition was Porsche-Arena.

== Medal summary ==
=== Men's events ===
Event	Gold	Silver	Bronze
Team	Germany; Timo Boll; Dimitrij Ovtcharov; Christian Süß	Denmark; Michael Maze; Finn Tugwell; Martin Monrad	Romania; Adrian Crișan; Andrei Filimon; Constantin Cioti Austria; Chen Weixing; Werner Schlager; Robert Gardos
Singles	Michael Maze (DEN)	Werner Schlager (AUT)	Timo Boll (GER) Fedor Kuzmin (RUS)
Doubles	Timo Boll (GER); Christian Süß (GER)	Wang Zengyi (POL); Lucjan Blaszczyk (POL)	Bojan Tokič (SLO); Aleksandar Karakašević (SRB) Emmanuel Lebesson (FRA); Damien Éloi (FRA)

=== Women's events ===
Event	Gold	Silver	Bronze
Team	Netherlands; Li Jiao; Li Jie; Elena Timina	Poland; Li Qian; Xu Jie; Natalia Partyka	Czech Republic; Iveta Vacenovská; Dana Hadačová; Renáta Štrbíková Croatia; Tamara Boroš; Andrea Bakula; Cornelia Vaida
Singles	Wu Jiaduo (GER)	Margaryta Pesotska (UKR)	Viktoria Pavlovich (BLR) Rūta Paškauskienė (LIT)
Doubles	Daniela Dodean (ROU); Elizabeta Samara (ROU)	Wenling Tan Monfardini (ITA); Nikoleta Stefanova (ITA)	Rūta Paškauskienė (LIT); Oksana Fadeyeva (RUS) Zhenqi Barthel (GER); Kristin Silbereisen (GER)
