= Stephanie Sang =

Australian table tennis player

Sang Xu
Personal information
- Nationality: Australian
- Born: 29 September 1986 (age 39) Harbin, China

Sport
- Sport: Table Tennis
- Events: Singles, Team
Medal record
Women's table tennis
Representing Australia
Commonwealth Games
Silver medal – second place	2006 Melbourne	Women's team

Sang Xu (born 29 September 1986 in Harbin, China), or Stephanie Sang, is a Chinese-born Australian table tennis player and Olympian.

She competed at the 2008 Summer Olympics, reaching the second round of the singles competition. She also competed in the team competition.

She currently resides in Melbourne, Victoria.

She has qualified to represent Australia at the 2020 Summer Olympics.
