= Irina Kotikhina =

Russian table tennis player

Irina Kotikhina (born 17 December 1980 in Gorky, Soviet Union) is a Russian professional table tennis player.

== Career highlights ==
World Championships
2001, Osaka, women's singles, last 128
2001, Osaka, team competition, 23rd
2006, Bremen, team competition, 13th
2007, Zagreb, women's singles, last 64
2007, Zagreb, women's doubles, last 32
2007, Zagreb, mixed doubles, last 128
Pro Tour Meetings
2005, St. Petersburg, women's singles, runner-up (silver)
2006, St. Petersburg, women's doubles, quarter final
2007, St. Petersburg, women's doubles, quarter final
2008, Velenje, women's singles, semi final
2008, Velenje, women's doubles, winner (gold)
European Championships
2007, Belgrade, women's singles, semi final
2007, Belgrade, mixed doubles, quarter final
2007, Belgrade, team competition, 2nd (silver)
European Youth Championships
1995, The Hague, women's doubles, runner-up (silver) (cadet)
1995, The Hague, team competition, 1st (gold) (cadet)
1998, Norcia, team competition, 1st (gold) (junior)
