= Lian Qian =

Dominican Republic table tennis player

Personal information
- Born: February 19, 1983 (age 43) Ürümqi, Xinjiang, China

Sport
- Sport: Table tennis
Medal record
Women's table tennis
Representing the Dominican Republic
Pan American Games
Bronze medal – third place	2007 Rio de Janeiro	Team

Lian "Jenifer" Qian (born 19 February 1983) is a female Chinese-born table tennis player who now represents the Dominican Republic.

She competed at the 2008 Summer Olympics, reaching the first round of the singles competition. She also competed in the team competition.
