= Pernille Agerholm =

Danish table tennis player (born 1991)

Personal information
- Nationality: Danish
- Born: 14 May 1991 (age 35)

Sport
- Sport: Table tennis

Pernille Agerholm (born 14 May 1991) is a Danish table tennis player. Her highest career ITTF ranking was 36.

== Playing style ==
Agerholm is right-handed, employs an attacking playing style, and uses the shakehand grip.

== Career ==
=== Rankings and performance ===
Agerholm reached her highest ITTF ranking of 36 during her career.

Her rating history, as recorded by Ratings Central, documents performances in major international events such as the European Team Championships and World Tour tournaments. For example, her rating was around 2078 in 2012 and 2047 in 2013.

During the 2009 Pro Tour Danish Open in Frederikshavn, Agerholm's rating changed from approximately 1946 to 1926 over the course of the tournament.

=== ITTF event participation ===
As of 2014, she was active in international competitions, including the European Team Championships and ITTF World Tour events.
