= Veronika Heine =

Austrian table tennis player (born 1986)

Veronika Heine (born 8 September 1986 in Vienna) is an Austrian table tennis player.

She competed at the 2008 Summer Olympics, reaching the bronze medal playoff of the team competition.
