= Carina Jonsson =

Swedish archer (born 1969)

Personal information
- Nationality: Swedish
- Born: 15 April 1969 (age 55); Nordanstig, Sweden

Sport
- Sport: Archery

Carina Jonsson (born 15 April 1969) is a Swedish archer. She competed in the women's individual and team events at the 1988 Summer Olympics.
