= Zhenqi Barthel =

German table tennis player

Zhenqi Barthel (Sun Zhenqi)
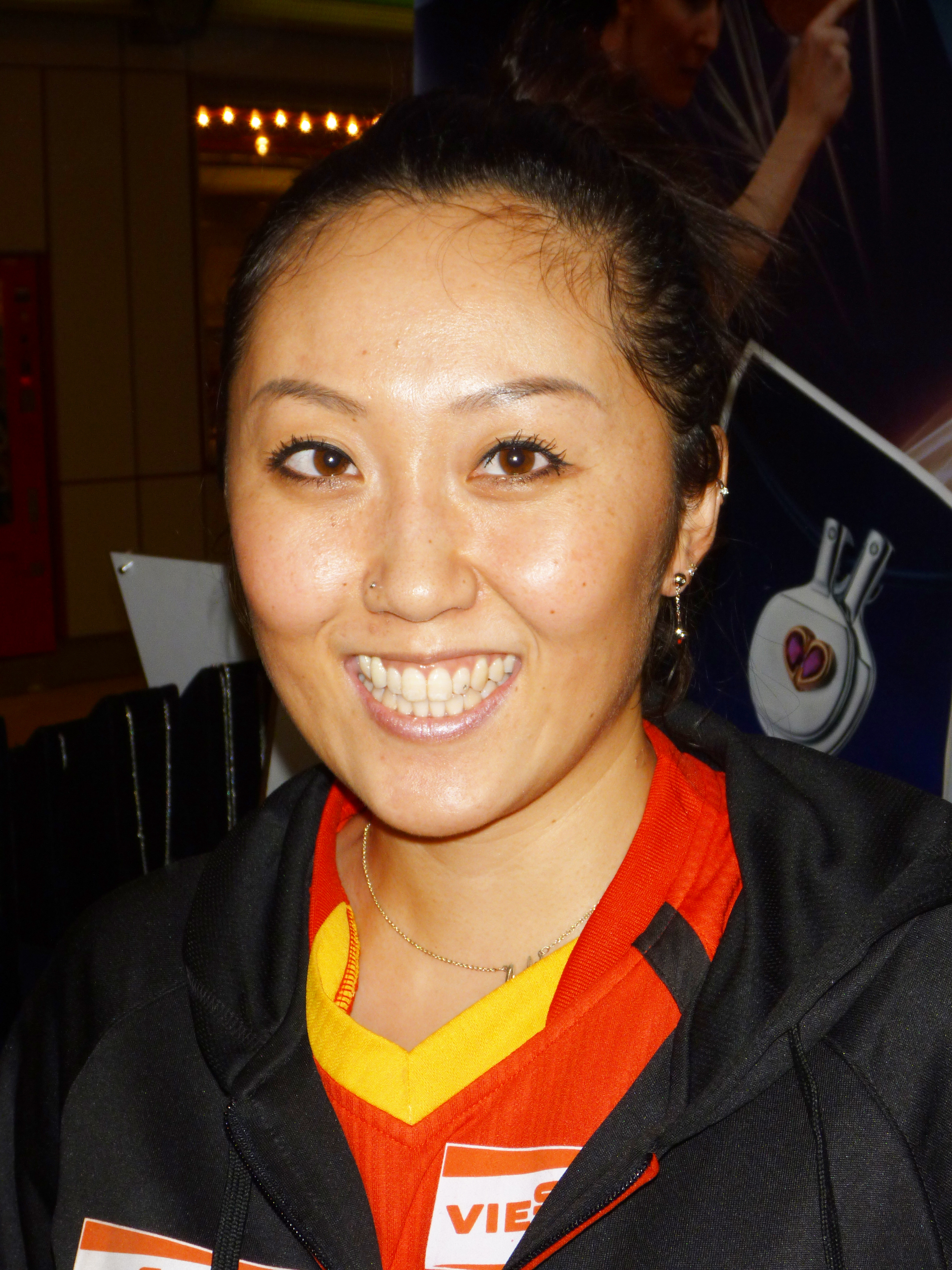
- Barthel wearing a pair of Free-Flowing Table Tennis Bat & Ball Earrings

Personal information
- Nickname: Lulu
- Nationality: Germany
- Born: 9 January 1987 (age 39) China
- Height: 1.64 m (5 ft 4 1/2 in)
- Weight: 62 kg (137 lb)

Sport
- Sport: Table tennis
- Club: TuS Holsterhausen
- Playing style: Right-handed, shakehand
- Equipment: Tibhar
- Highest ranking: 46 (February 2012)
- Current ranking: 66 (March 2013)
Medal record
Women's table tennis
Representing Germany
European Championships
Bronze medal – third place	2009 Stuttgart	Doubles
ITTF Pro Tour
Silver medal – second place	2013 Doha	Doubles

Zhenqi Barthel (Chinese: 孙祯琦; pinyin: Sūn Zhènqǐ; née Sun Zhenqi; born 9 January 1987) is a German table tennis player of Chinese origin. In 2002, she moved to Essen, Germany, where she became a resident athlete of TuS Holsterhausen, and trained for the table tennis team, under her personal coaches Jörg Bitzigeio and Wang Zhi. Three years later, she was adopted by the couple Barthel, changed her surname, and obtained a German citizenship. As of March 2013, Barthel is ranked no. 66 in the world by the International Table Tennis Federation (ITTF). She is also right-handed, and uses the shakehand grip.

Barthel qualified for the inaugural women's team event at the 2008 Summer Olympics in Beijing, by receiving a spot as one of the remaining top 10 teams from ITTF's Computer Team Ranking List. Playing with fellow Chinese-born teammate Wu Jiaduo and Olympic veteran Elke Schall, Barthel placed fourth in the preliminary pool round, against Hong Kong, Poland, and Romania, with a total score of three points, and three straight losses.

At the 2009 European Championships in Stuttgart, Barthel and her partner Kristin Silbereisen won a bronze medal in the women's doubles match, and shared their triumph with the Eastern European duo Oksana Fadeyeva (Russia) and Rūta Paškauskienė (Lithuania). Four years later, Barthel captured a silver medal, along with Shan Xiaona, in the same tournament at the ITTF 2013 World Tour Qatar Open in Doha, losing out to the formidable Chinese duo and Olympic champions Ding Ning and Li Xiaoxia (8–11, 11–9, 7–11, 9–11).
