= Tatyana Kostromina =

Belarusian table tennis player

Tatyana Kostromina (born 15 February 1973) is a Belarusian table tennis player.

She competed at the 2008 Summer Olympics, reaching the third round of the singles competition. She also competed in the doubles competition in 2004.

She was born in Gomel, and resides there.
