= Laura Negrisoli =

Italian table tennis player (born 1974)

Personal information
- Nationality: Italian
- Born: 7 September 1974 (age 52) Castel Goffredo, Italy

Sport
- Sport: Table tennis
Medal record
Women's table tennis
Representing Italy
European Championships
Gold medal – first place	2003 Courmayeur	Team
Mediterranean Games
Bronze medal – third place	2005 Almería	Doubles

Laura Negrisoli (born 7 September 1974) is an Italian table tennis player. She won the gold medal in the team event at the 2003 Table Tennis European Championships.

Negrisoli competed at the 1996 and 2004 Summer Olympics.
