= Linda Creemers =

Dutch table tennis player

Personal information
- Nationality: Dutch
- Born: 13 January 1985 (age 41) Weert, Netherlands

Sport
- Sport: Table tennis
Medal record
Women's table tennis
Representing the Netherlands
European Championships
Gold medal – first place	2008 Saint Petersburg	Team
Gold medal – first place	2009 Stuttgart	Team

Linda Creemers (born 13 January 1985) is a Dutch table tennis player. Her highest career ITTF ranking was 118.
