= Li Qiangbing =

Austrian table tennis player

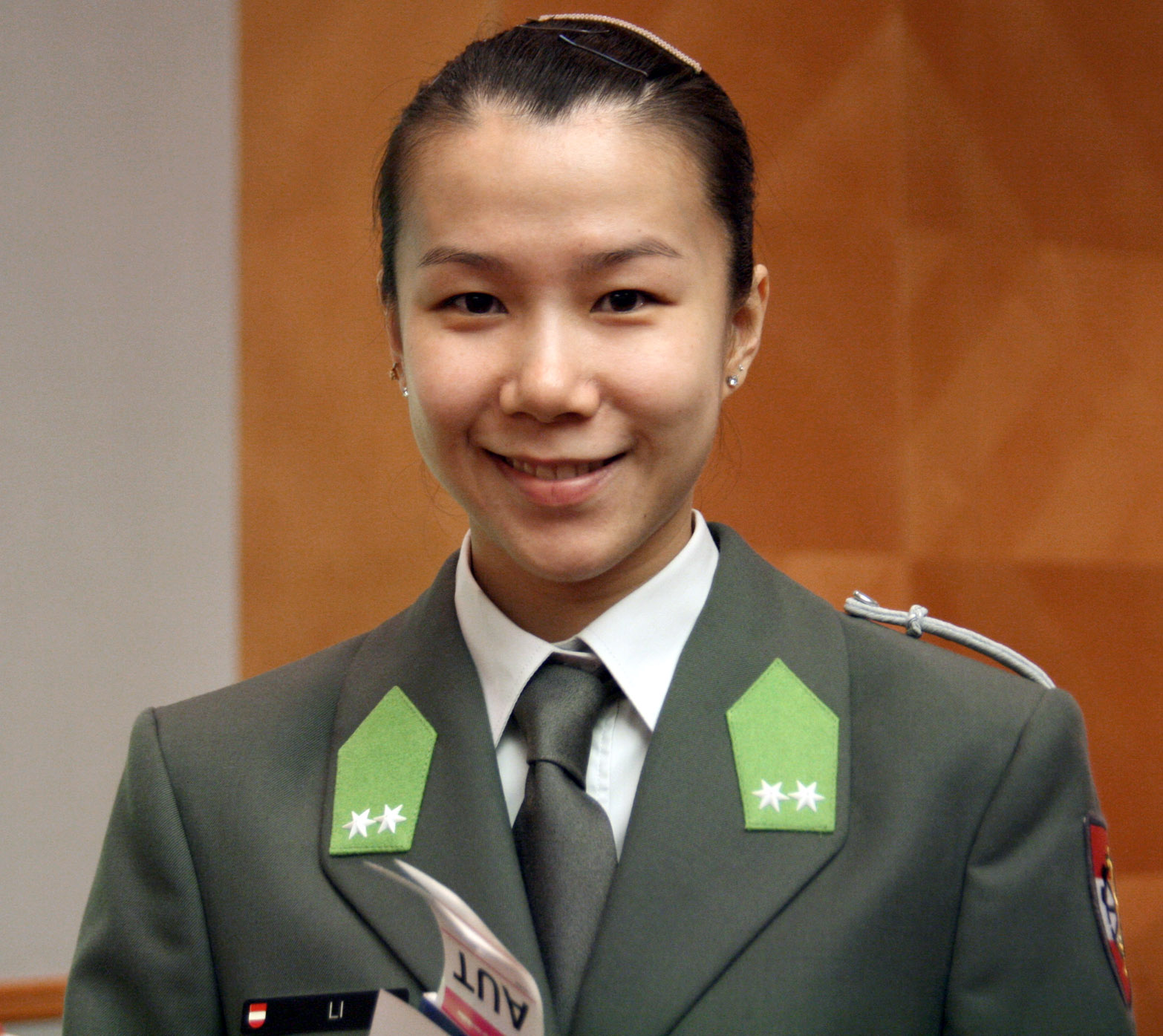
Li Qiangbing (2012)

Li Qiangbing (born 30 April 1985) is a female Chinese-born table tennis player who now represents Austria.

She competed at the 2008 Summer Olympics, reaching the fourth round of the singles competition. She also competed in the team competition. She competed in the same events at the 2012 Summer Olympics, reaching the third round of the singles competition.

She was born in Beijing.
