= Iulia Necula =

Romanian table tennis player

Personal information
- Full name: Iulia Necula
- Nationality: Romania
- Born: April 26, 1986 (age 40) Constanţa, Romania
- Height: 1.62 m (5 ft 4 in)
- Weight: 57 kg (126 lb)

Sport
- Sport: Table tennis
Medal record
Women's table tennis
Representing Romania
European Championships
| Silver medal – second place | 2015 Yekaterinburg | Team |
| Silver medal – second place | 2013 Schwechat | Team |
| Silver medal – second place | 2010 Ostrava | Team |
| Bronze medal – third place | 2008 St. Petersburg | Team |

Iulia Necula (born April 26, 1986 in Constanţa), is a Romanian professional table tennis player.

She competed in the team competition at the 2008 Summer Olympics.
