= Andrea Bakula =

Croatian table tennis player (born 1981)

Medal record

Women's table tennis

Representing Croatia

European Table Tennis Championships
Bronze medal – third place	2009 Stuttgart	Team

Andrea Bakula (born 15 August 1981 in Zagreb) is a Croatian table tennis player.

She competed at the 2008 Summer Olympics, reaching the first round of the singles competition. She also competed in the team competition.

She was born in Zagreb, and resides there.
