= Galia Dvorak =

Spanish table tennis player

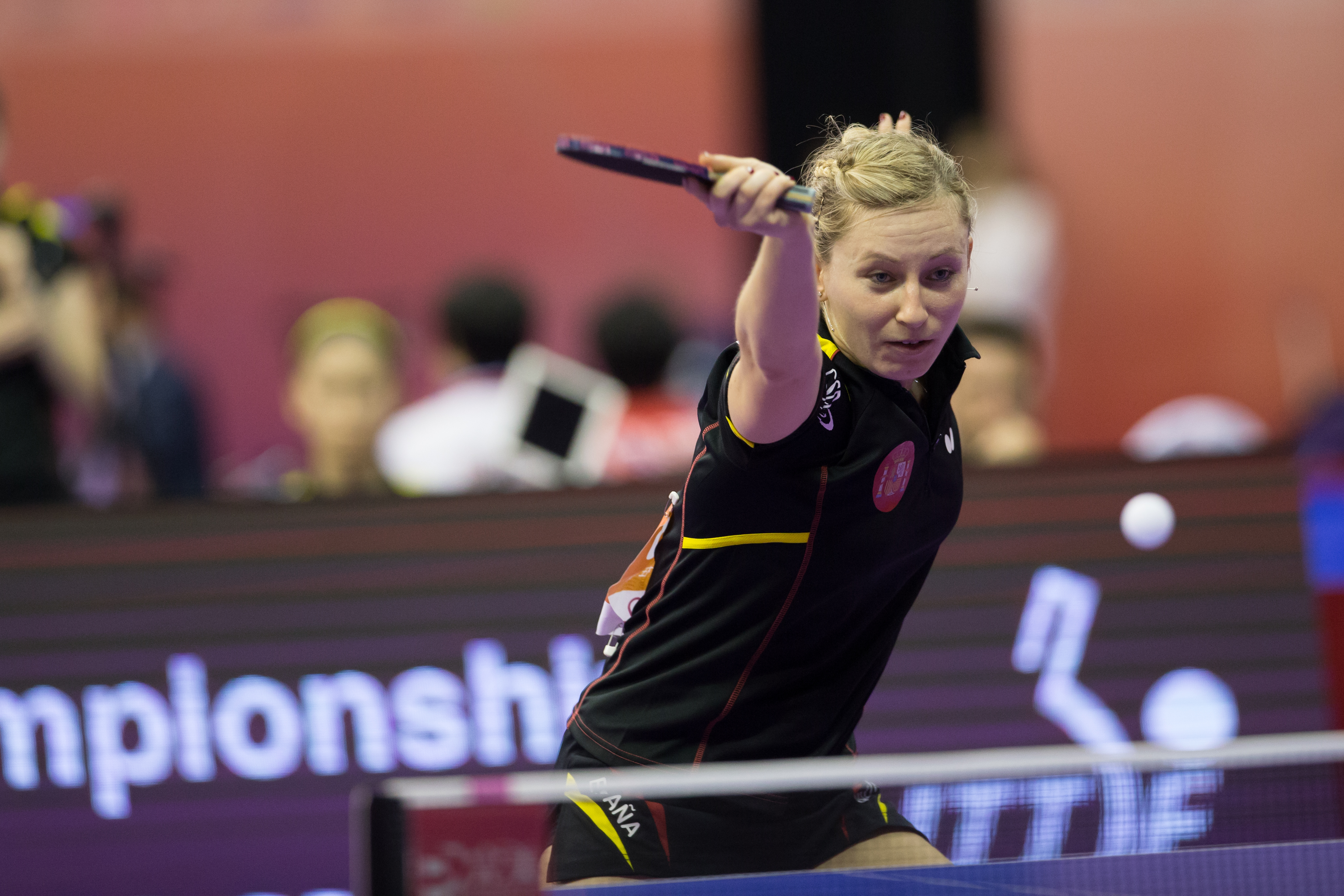
- Dvorak in 2016

Personal information
- Full name: Galyna Volodymyrivna; Dvorak Khasanova
- Nationality: Spain
- Born: 1 April 1988 (age 38) Kyiv, Ukrainian SSR, Soviet Union
- Height: 1.68 m (5 ft 6 in)
- Weight: 58 kg (128 lb)

Sport
- Sport: Table tennis
- Club: CN Mataró
- Playing style: Right-handed, classic
- Highest ranking: 72 (February 2010)
- Current ranking: 94 (May 2019)
Medal record
Women's table tennis
Representing Spain
European Championships
Bronze medal – third place	2013 Schwechat	Doubles
Mediterranean Games
Gold medal – first place	2018 Tarragona	Team
Bronze medal – third place	2009 Pescara	Team
Bronze medal – third place	2018 Tarragona	Individual

Galyna Volodymyrivna "Galia" Dvorak Khasanova (Ukrainian: Галина Володимирівна Дворжака Хасанова; born 1 April 1988) is a Spanish table tennis player. She was born in Kyiv, but her family moved to Spain when she was two. Both of her parents (Vladimir Dvorak and Flora Khasanova) were also international table tennis players. She won a bronze medal in the women's team event at the 2009 Mediterranean Games in Pescara, Italy. As of May 2019, Dvorak is ranked no. 94 in the world by the International Table Tennis Federation (ITTF). Dvorak is a member of the table tennis team for CN Mataró, and is coached and trained by Peter Engel, Linus Mernsten, and her mother Flora Khasanova. She is also right-handed, and uses the classic grip.

Dvorak made her official debut, as a 20-year-old, at the 2008 Summer Olympics in Beijing, where she competed only in the inaugural women's team event. Playing with Chinese emigrants Shen Yanfei and Zhu Fang, Dvorak placed third in the preliminary pool round, with a total of four points, two defeats from Japan and South Korea, and a single victory over the Australian trio Miao Miao, Jian Fang Lay, and Stephanie Sang Xu.

Four years after competing in her first Olympics, Dvorak qualified for her second Spanish team, as a 24-year-old, at the 2012 Summer Olympics in London, by receiving an allocation spot from the Final World Qualifying Tournament in Doha, Qatar. With a maximum of two quotas per nation in the singles tournament, Dvorak accepted the third spot, and thereby competed only in the women's team event, along with her fellow players Sara Ramírez and Shen Yanfei. Dvorak and her team lost the first round match to the formidable Chinese trio Li Xiaoxia, Guo Yue, and Ding Ning, with a unanimous set score of 0–3 (4–11, 7–11, 12–14).

At the 2016 Summer Olympics, she competed in the women's singles only. She was a replacement for the injured French player Carole Grundisch. She lost to home player Lin Gui in her first match.
