= Mie Skov =

Danish table tennis player

Mie Skov (born 24 May 1986) is a retired table tennis player from Denmark who participated in the 2012 Summer Olympics. She defeated Egyptian player Nadeen El-Dawlatly in four sets. In the second round, she lost 3–4 to Natalia Partyka, a Polish player.
