= Moon Hyun-jung =

South Korean table tennis player

Moon Hyun-Jung
Personal information
- Nationality: South Korean
- Born: 6 May 1984 (age 41)

Sport
- Sport: Table tennis

Moon Hyun-Jung (born 6 May 1984) is a South Korean table tennis player. Her highest career ITTF ranking was 19.
