= Elena Timina =

Russian-Dutch table tennis player

Timina Elena
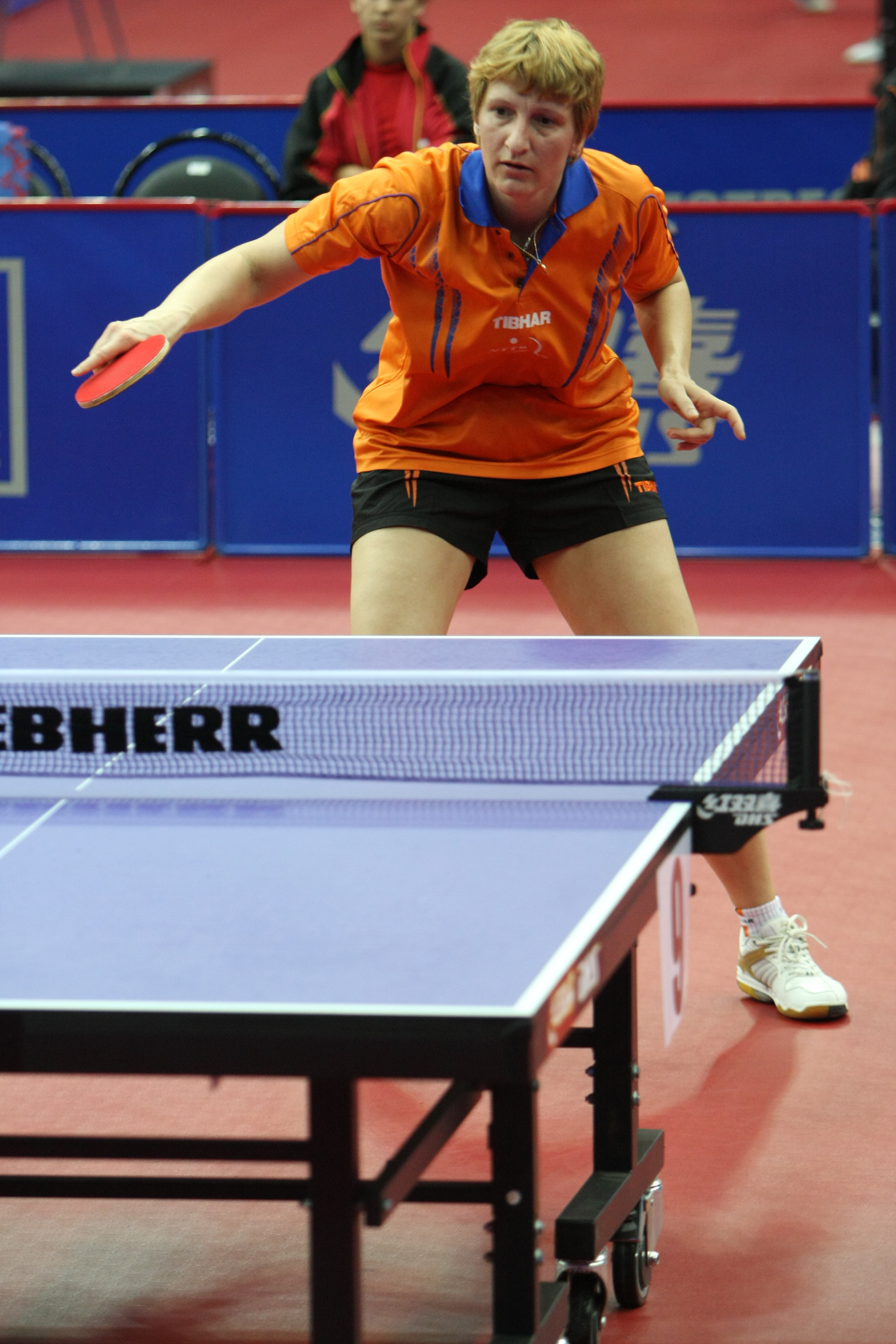

Personal information
- Full name: Timina Elena
- Nationality: Netherlands Russia Soviet Union
- Born: 8 May 1969 (age 57)

Sport
- Sport: Table tennis
Medal record
Women's table tennis
World Cup
Representing Russia
| Gold medal – first place | 1994 Nîmes | Team |
European Championships
Representing Soviet Union
| Silver medal – second place | 1990 Gothenburg | Doubles |
Representing Unified Team
| Bronze medal – third place | 1992 Stuttgart | Team |
| Bronze medal – third place | 1992 Stuttgart | Doubles |
Representing Russia
| Gold medal – first place | 1994 Birmingham | Team |
| Silver medal – second place | 1994 Birmingham | Doubles |
Representing Netherlands
| Gold medal – first place | 2008 Saint-Petersburg | Team |
| Gold medal – first place | 2009 Stuttgart | Team |
| Gold medal – first place | 2010 Ostrava | Team |
| Silver medal – second place | 2010 Ostrava | Doubles |
| Gold medal – first place | 2011 Gdańsk | Team |
| Bronze medal – third place | 2011 Gdańsk | Doubles |

Elena Timina (born 8 May 1969) is a Russian-born Dutch professional table tennis player. She was born in Moscow, Soviet Union.

== Career highlights ==
Summer Olympic Games
1992, Barcelona, women's singles, 1st round
1992, Barcelona, women's doubles, quarter final
1996, Atlanta, women's singles, 1st round
1996, Atlanta, women's doubles, quarter final
2012, London, women's team, quarter final
World Championships
1989, Dortmund, women's doubles, last 16
1993, Gothenburg, team competition, 5th
1995, Tianjin, women's doubles, quarter final
1995, Tianjin, team competition, 9th
1997, Manchester, women's doubles, last 16
1997, Manchester, team competition, 9th
World Team Cup
1990, Hokkaidō, 5th
1991, Barcelona, 9th
1994, Nîmes, 1st (gold)
1995, Atlanta, 5th
World Doubles Cup:
1992, Las Vegas, women's doubles, quarter final
Pro Tour Meetings
1996, Kettering, women's singles, semi final
1996, Kettering, women's doubles, quarter final
1996, Bolzano, women's doubles, quarter final
1998, Doha, women's doubles, semi final
1998, Zagreb, women's doubles, quarter final
2007, Velenje, women's doubles, semi final
European Championships
1990, Gothenburg, women's singles, last 16
1990, Gothenburg, women's doubles, runner-up (silver)
1992, Stuttgart, women's singles, last 16
1992, Stuttgart, women's doubles, semi final
1994, Birmingham, women's singles, last 16
1994, Birmingham, women's doubles, runner-up (silver)
1994, Birmingham, team competition, 1st (gold)
1996, Bratislava, women's singles, last 16
1998, Eindhoven, women's singles, last 16
2008 – 2011, European Champion team tournament
European Youth Championships
1983, Malmö, women's doubles, runner up (silver) (cadet)
1986, Louvin La Neuve, women's singles, semi final (juniors)
European Top-12 Championships
1992, Vienna, 5th
1993, Copenhagen, 9th
1994, Arezzo, 11th
1995, Dijon, 9th
1996, Charleroi, 11th
1997, Eindhoven, 9th
