= Hiroko Fujii =

Japanese table tennis player

Personal information
- Nationality: Japanese
- Born: 18 October 1982 (age 43)

Sport
- Sport: Table tennis

Hiroko Fujii (born 18 October 1982) is a Japanese table tennis player. Her highest career ITTF ranking was 26.
