= Li Jiao (table tennis) =

Dutch table tennis player

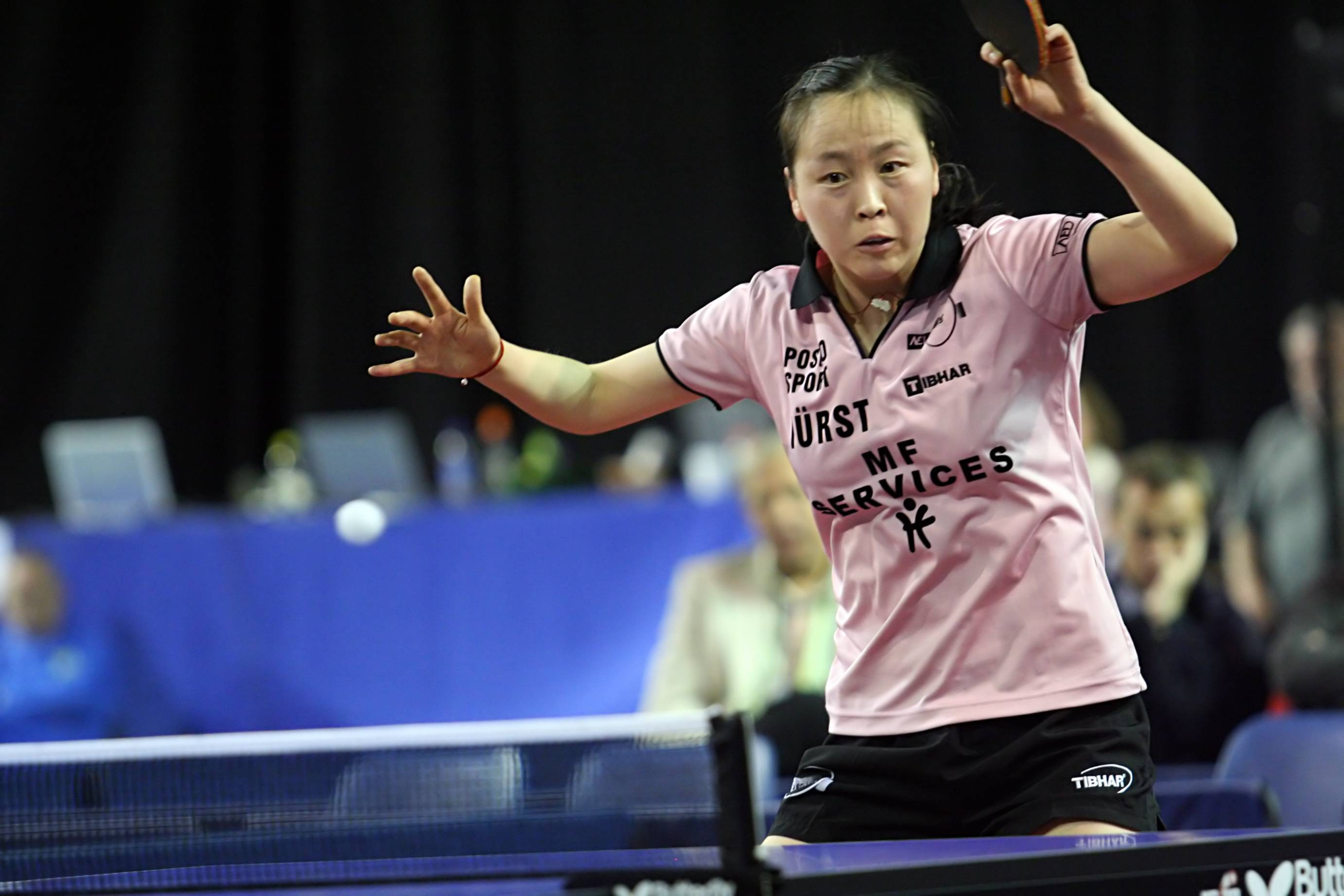

Personal information
- Nationality: Netherlands
- Born: 15 January 1973 (age 53) Qingdao, China
- Height: 1.67 m (5 ft 6 in)
- Weight: 58 kg (128 lb)

Sport
- Sport: Table tennis
- Highest ranking: 10 (January 2011)
- Current ranking: 31 (August 2016)
Medal record
Women's table tennis
Representing the Netherlands
European Games
Gold medal – first place	2015 Baku	Singles
Silver medal – second place	2015 Baku	Team
European Championships
Gold medal – first place	2007 Belgrade	Singles
Gold medal – first place	2008 Saint Petersburg	Team
Gold medal – first place	2009 Stuttgart	Team
Gold medal – first place	2011 Gdańsk-Sopot	Singles
Gold medal – first place	2011 Gdańsk-Sopot	Team
Bronze medal – third place	2005 Aarhus	Singles

Li Jiao (born 15 January 1973) is a Chinese-born professional table tennis player who now represents the Netherlands. She resides in Heerhugowaard.

== Notable matches ==
In the World Team Championship 2014 Quarter Final draw of Netherlands versus the host team Japan, Li, ranked 13th at the time, famously came from behind to defeat both the then World No. 10 Kasumi Ishikawa and World No. 25 Sayaka Hirano, in five sets. The match eventually finished 3–2 to Japan, with the final match of Britt Eerland (Netherlands) versus Kasumi Ishikawa (Japan) also ending in five sets.

== Career highlights ==
Olympic Games
2008, Beijing, women's singles, last 16
2008, Beijing, team competition
2012, London, women's singles, last 8
2012, London, team competition, last 8
World Championships
2005, Shanghai, women's singles, quarter final
2005, Shanghai, mixed doubles, last 32
2006, Bremen, team competition, 14th
2007, Zagreb, women's singles, last 16
2007, Zagreb, mixed doubles, last 32
2008, Guangzhou, team competition, 7th
Pro Tour Grand Finals
2006, Hong Kong, women's singles, last 16
Pro Tour Meetings
2004, Warsaw, women's singles, quarter final
2004, Warsaw, women's doubles, winner (gold)
2004, Aarhus, women's singles, semi final
2005, Santiago, women's singles, quarter final
2005, Fort Lauderdale, women's singles, quarter final
2006, Saint Petersburg, women's singles, semi final
2006, Bayreuth, women's singles, quarter final
2006, Warsaw, women's singles, semi final
2008, Velenje, women's singles, winner (gold)
2008, Velenje, women's doubles, runner-up (silver)
2008, Santiago, women's doubles, semi final
European Games
2015, Baku, women's singles, winner (gold)
2015, Baku, team competition, runner-up (silver)
European Championships
2005, Aarhus, women's singles, semi final
2005, Aarhus, mixed doubles, quarter final
2007, Belgrade, women's singles, winner (gold)
2008, Saint Petersburg, team competition, winner (gold)
European Top-12 Championships
2005, Rennes, 3rd (bronze)
2006, Copenhagen, 3rd (bronze)
2007, Arezzo, 1st (gold)
2008, Frankfurt, 1st (gold)
2010, Düsseldorf, 1st (gold)
2011, Liège, 1st (gold)
