= Cornelia Molnar =

Croatian table tennis player

Personal information
- Full name: Cornelia Molnar-Vaida
- Nationality: Croatia Romania
- Born: 26 November 1983 (age 42) Târgu Mureș, Romania

Sport
- Sport: Table tennis
Medal record
Women's table tennis
Representing Croatia
European Championships
Silver medal – second place	2003 Courmayeur	Team
Silver medal – second place	2005 Aarhus	Team
Mediterranean Games
Bronze medal – third place	2001 Tunis	Doubles

Cornelia Molnar (Croatian: Kornelija Molnar-Vajda, born 26 November 1983) is a Croatian table tennis player. She competed for Croatia at the 2004 Summer Olympics and 2012 Summer Olympics.
