= Sayaka Hirano =

Japanese table tennis player (born 1985)

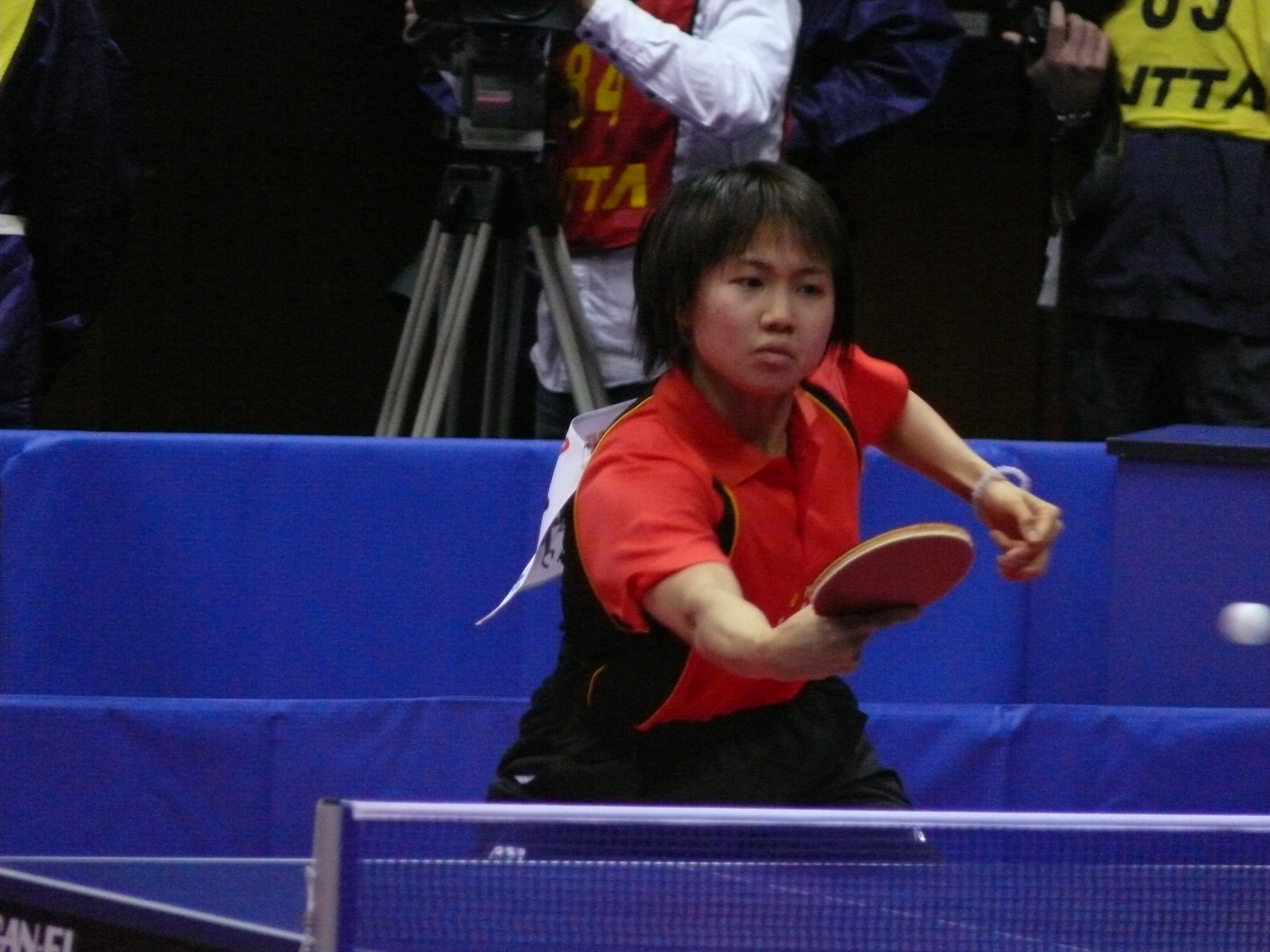
- Sayaka Hirano in 2008

Personal information
- Nationality: Japan
- Born: 24 March 1985 (age 41) Kanuma, Tochigi, Japan
- Height: 158 cm (5 ft 2 in)
- Weight: 54 kg (119 lb)

Sport
- Sport: Table tennis
- Highest ranking: 10 (August 2011)
Medal record
Women's table tennis
Representing Japan
Olympic Games
Silver medal – second place	2012 London	Team
World Championships
Silver medal – second place	2014 Tokyo	Team
Bronze medal – third place	2004 Doha	Team
Bronze medal – third place	2006 Bremen	Team
Bronze medal – third place	2008 Guangzhou	Team
Bronze medal – third place	2010 Moscow	Team

Sayaka Hirano (平野 早矢香, Hirano Sayaka; born 24 March 1985) is a Japanese five-time national table tennis champion.

She competed at the 2008 Summer Olympics, reaching the third round of the singles competition. She also competed in the team competition, reaching the bronze medal final but losing to South Korea.

At the 2012 London Olympics Women's Team Event semi-finals, she helped Japan overcome Singapore to reach their historic first final by winning her doubles match with Kasumi Ishikawa over Wang Yuegu and Li Jiawei (11–3, 13-11 and 11–4). Japan failed to beat China in the final, but won the first ever silver medal for their country in table tennis.

In March 2016, it was announced that she would be retiring after the Japanese Table Tennis League Big Tournament in April. She was beaten in the first round by Yuko Fujii and after the match, she said, "I feel I've done everything, I might have wanted to play a little better match. I've gone into each match thinking as if it were the last, and managed to end without any regrets".

After her retirement as a professional table tennis player, she has become a familiar face in Japanese households as a TV presenter and table tennis sportscaster. She is also an adviser for table tennis club MIKI House.

== Career records ==
Singles (as of 10 October 2015)

- Olympics: round of 32 (2008).
- World Championships: round of 16 (2011).
- World Cup appearances: 4. Record: 5-8th (2014).
- Pro Tour winner (5): Serbian Open 2006; German Open 2009; India Open 2010; Spanish Open 2011; Belarusian Open 2014.
  Runner-up (4): Chile Open 2007; Japan Open 2009; Morocco Open 2011; Spanish Open 2015.
- Pro Tour Grand Finals appearances: 6. Record: QF (2009, 2014).
- Asian Games: QF (2010).
- Asian Championships: Round of 16 (2003, 05, 07, 09).
- Asian Cup: 6th (2004).

Women's doubles

- World Championships: QF (2009).
- Pro Tour winner (4): Polish Open 2006; Austrian Open 2007; Japan Open 2009; Egypt Open 2010; Chile Open 2010; Russia 2014.
  Runner-up (5): Brazil, Chile, Serbian Open 2006; China (Shenzhen), Swedish Open 2007; Moroccan Open 2011.
- Pro Tour Grand Finals appearances: 3. Record: QF (2006, 07, 09).
- Asian Championships: QF (2007, 09).

Mixed doubles

- World Championships: round of 16 (2009, 15).

Team

- Olympics: 2nd (2012).
- World Championships: 2nd (2014).
- World Team Cup: 3rd (2009).
