= Wu Jiaduo =

German table tennis player

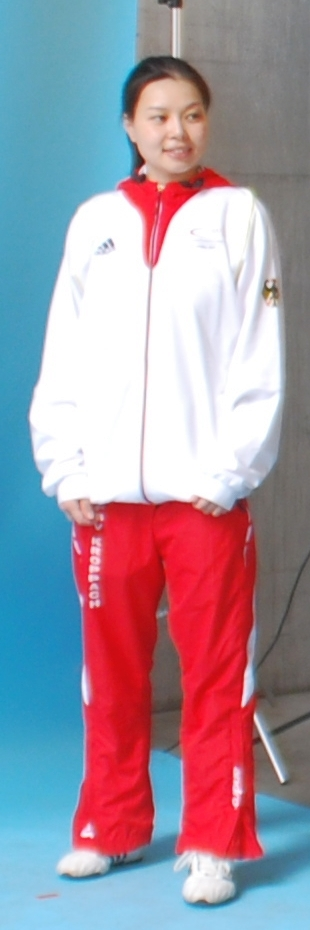
- Outfitting the Olympic team of Germany 2012

Personal information
- Nickname: Dudu
- Nationality: China / Germany
- Born: 19 September 1977 (age 48) Linhai, Zhejiang, China
- Height: 1.65 m (5 ft 5 in)
- Weight: 54 kg (119 lb; 8.5 st)

Sport
- Sport: Table tennis
- Club: FSV Kroppach
- Playing style: Righted-handed, shakehand grip
- Highest ranking: 11 (July – August 2010)
Medal record
Women's table tennis
Representing Germany
World Championships
Bronze medal – third place	2010 Moscow	Women's Team
European Championships
Gold medal – first place	2009 Stuttgart	Singles
Bronze medal – third place	2007 Belgrade	Doubles
Bronze medal – third place	2012 Herning	Doubles

Wu Jiaduo (simplified Chinese: 吴佳多; traditional Chinese: 吳佳多; born 19 September 1977) is a Chinese-born German table tennis player.

== Personal ==
At age seven, Wu received specialised table tennis training. In 1995, she became the Zhejiang provincial champion. She enrolled at the East China University of Science and Technology in 1997, studying economics. One year later, she relocated to Germany to further her table tennis career.

In 2005, she started to represent Germany at the international tournaments like ITTF Pro Tour.

She resides in Düsseldorf, Germany and plays for FSV Kroppach.

== Career records ==
Singles (as of 3 October 2014)

- Olympics: round of 16 (2012).
- World Championships: round of 16 (2011).
- World Cup appearances: 3. Record: 5–8th (2011).
- Pro Tour runner-up (1): German Open 2008.
- Pro Tour Grand Finals appearances: 5. Record: round of 16 (2007, 08, 09, 11).
- European Championships: winner (2009).
- Europe Top-12: Winner (2012).

Women's doubles

- World Championships: round of 16 (2009, 13).
- Pro Tour runner-up (1): German Open 2009.
- Pro Tour Grand Finals appearances: 1. Record: SF (2009).
- European Championships: SF (2007, 12).

Mixed doubles

- World Championships: round of 64 (2007, 09).
- European Championships: QF (2007).

Team

- Olympics: 5 (2012).
- World Championships: 3rd (2010).
- World Team Cup: 5th (2007, 2013)
- World Cup: 5th (2011)
