= Xu Jie (table tennis) =

Chinese-Polish table tennis player

Xu Jie (Chinese: 徐洁, born January 21, 1982, in Tianjin) is a Chinese-Polish female table tennis player, member of the Polish national team for the 2008 Olympic Games in Beijing. She has lived in Poland since 1999 and became a naturalised citizen in 2003. Between 1999 and 2005, she represented the team of AZS Częstochowa, later moving to GLKS Wanzl Scania Nadarzyn, located in the suburbs of Warsaw.

Xu Jie was ranked in 73rd place in world rank of the International Table Tennis Federation in 2010. She is a five times individual champion of Poland (2005, 2006, 2007 and 2008, 2010).
