= Daniela Dodean =

Romanian table tennis player

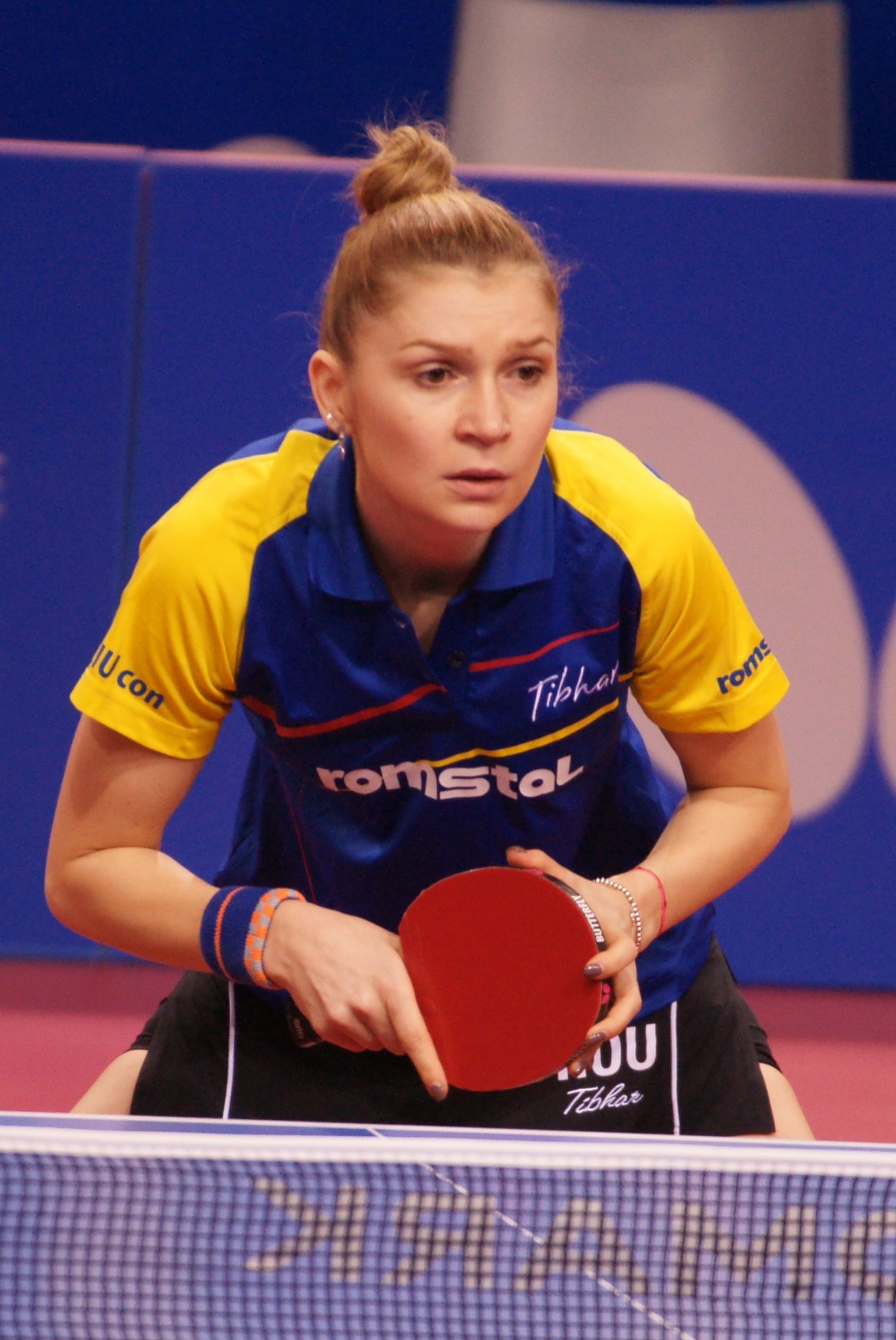
- Dodean in 2017

Personal information
- Nicknames: Dana, Arad Tiger
- Nationality: Romania
- Born: 13 January 1988 (age 38) Arad, Romania
- Height: 1.70 m (5 ft 7 in)
- Weight: 60 kg (132 lb)

Sport
- Sport: Table tennis
- Club: SVS STRÖCK (Austria)
- Equipment: Butterfly
- Highest ranking: 19 (May 2010)
Medal record
Women's table tennis
Representing Romania
European Games
Silver medal – second place	2019 Minsk	Team
European Championships
Gold medal – first place	2009 Stuttgart	Doubles
Gold medal – first place	2012 Herning	Doubles
Gold medal – first place	2017 Luxembourg City	Team
Silver medal – second place	2015 Yekaterinburg	Team
Silver medal – second place	2013 Schwechat	Team
Silver medal – second place	2011 Gdansk-Sopot	Doubles
Silver medal – second place	2011 Gdansk-Sopot	Team
Silver medal – second place	2010 Ostrava	Team
Bronze medal – third place	2010 Ostrava	Doubles
Bronze medal – third place	2008 St. Petersburg	Team

Daniela Monteiro, née Dodean (born 13 January 1988 in Arad), is a Romanian professional table tennis player and European champion. She competed for Romania in the women's singles and team at the 2008 Summer Olympics, the women's singles at the 2012 Summer Olympics and the team and individual events at the 2016 Summer Olympics.

Since 2011 she lives in Schwechat, Austria and practices at the Werner Schlager Academy.

== Personal life ==
Her brother, Adrian, is also a table tennis player. In July 2013, she married Portuguese table tennis player João Monteiro. On 21 April 2015, she gave birth to a daughter, Lara Melissa, in Vienna.
