= Rūta Paškauskienė =

Lithuanian table tennis player (born 1977)

Personal information
- Full name: Rūta Paškauskienė-Būdienė-Garkauskaitė
- Nationality: Lithuania

Sport
- Sport: Table tennis
Medal record
Women's table tennis
Representing Lithuania
European Championships
Gold medal – first place	2000 Bremen	Mixed Doubles
Gold medal – first place	2005 Aarhus	Mixed Doubles
Gold medal – first place	2007 Belgrade	Mixed Doubles
Gold medal – first place	2008 Saint-Petersburg	Singles
Gold medal – first place	2009 Subotica	Mixed Doubles
Gold medal – first place	2010 Ostrava	Doubles
Gold medal – first place	2011 Gdansk-Sopot	Doubles
Silver medal – second place	2002 Zagreb	Mixed Doubles
Silver medal – second place	2011 Istanbul	Mixed Doubles
Bronze medal – third place	1994 Birmingham	Doubles
Bronze medal – third place	1996 Bratislava	Doubles
Bronze medal – third place	2002 Zagreb	Doubles
Bronze medal – third place	2009 Stuttgart	Singles
Bronze medal – third place	2009 Stuttgart	Doubles
Bronze medal – third place	2010 Ostrava	Singles
Bronze medal – third place	2010 Subotica	Mixed Doubles
Bronze medal – third place	2016 Budapest	Mixed Doubles
Bronze medal – third place	2018 Alicante	Mixed Doubles

Rūta Paškauskienė (born 29 March 1977) is a Lithuanian table tennis player. Since 1994, she won several medals in singles, and doubles events in the Table Tennis European Championships.

She competed at the 2008 Summer Olympics, reaching the second round of the singles competition.

She was born in Kaunas, and resides there.
