= 2013 World Table Tennis Championships – Women's doubles =

Women's doubles at the 2013 World Table Tennis Championships
- Venue: Palais Omnisports de Paris-Bercy
- Location: Paris, France
- Dates: 15–20 May
- Final score: 5–11, 11–5, 11–7, 11–5, 11–7

Medalists
gold medal	Guo Yue; Li Xiaoxia	China
silver medal	Ding Ning; Liu Shiwen	China
bronze medal	Feng Tianwei; Yu Mengyu	Singapore
bronze medal	Chen Meng; Zhu Yuling	China

The 2013 World Table Tennis Championships women's doubles was the 51st edition of the women's doubles championship.

Guo Yue and Li Xiaoxia are the defending champions.
Guo Yue and Li Xiaoxia defeated Ding Ning and Liu Shiwen 5–11, 11–5, 11–7, 11–5, 11–7 in the final to win the title.

== Seeds ==
Doubles matches will be best of 5 games in qualification matches and best of 7 games in the 64-player sized main draw.

1. (China) Guo Yue / (China) Li Xiaoxia (champions)
2. (China) Ding Ning / (China) Liu Shiwen (finals)
3. (China) Chen Meng / (China) Zhu Yuling (semifinals)
4. (Singapore) Feng Tianwei / (Singapore) Yu Mengyu (semifinals)
5. (Hong Kong) Jiang Huajun / (Hong Kong) Lee Ho Ching (quarterfinals)
6. (Japan) Hiroko Fujii / (Japan) Misako Wakamiya (quarterfinals)
7. (South Korea) Park Young-Sook / (South Korea) Yang Ha-Eun (quarterfinals)
8. (North Korea) Kim Hye-Song / (North Korea) Kim Jong (third round)
9. (Japan) Kasumi Ishikawa / (Japan) Misaki Morizono (third round)
10. (Chinese Taipei) Cheng I-ching / (Chinese Taipei) Huang Yi-hua (third round)
11. (Romania) Daniela Dodean / (Romania) Elizabeta Samara (second round)
12. (Hungary) Georgina Póta / (Hungary) Krisztina Tóth (third round)
13. (Japan) Ai Fukuhara / (Japan) Sayaka Hirano (quarterfinals)
14. (Germany) Kristin Silbereisen / (Germany) Wu Jiaduo (third round)
15. (North Korea) Ri Mi-Gyong / (North Korea) Ri Myong-Sun (third round)
16. (Germany) Petrissa Solja / (Germany) Sabine Winter (second round)
17. (Poland) Katarzyna Grzybowska / (Poland) Natalia Partyka (third round)
18. (Czech Republic) Dana Čechová / (Czech Republic) Renáta Štrbíková (second round)
19. (Spain) Galia Dvorak / (Spain) Sara Ramírez (first round)
20. (Czech Republic) Katerina Pěnkavová / (Czech Republic) Iveta Vacenovská (second round)
21. (Germany) Zhenqi Barthel / (Germany) Irene Ivancan (second round)
22. (South Korea) Park Seong-Hye / (South Korea) Seok Ha-Jung (second round)
23. (Ukraine) Tetyana Bilenko / (Ukraine) Ganna Gaponova (second round)
24. (Hungary) Petra Lovas / (Hungary) Szandra Pergel (second round)
25. (Belarus) Alina Arlouskaya / (Belarus) Viktoria Pavlovich (second round)
26. (Hong Kong) Guan Mengyuan / (Hong Kong) Ng Wing Nam (third round)
27. (Hong Kong) Doo Hoi Kem / (Hong Kong) Li Ching Wan (first round)
28. (United States) Ariel Hsing / (United States) Lily Zhang (first round)
29. (France) Laura Gasnier / (France) Xian Yi Fang (second round)
30. (Romania) Camelia Postoaca / (Romania) Bernadette Szőcs (second round)
31. (Chinese Taipei) Chen Szu-yu / (Chinese Taipei) Liu Hsing-yin (second round)
32. (France) Alice Abbat / (France) Carole Grundisch (second round)

== Draw ==
=== Key ===
- Q = Qualifier
- w/o = Walkover
- w/d = Withdraw
- r = Retired
- DQ = Disqualified

=== Finals ===
Semifinals									Final
1	(China) Guo Yue (China) Li Xiaoxia	10	11	11	11	9	11
4	(Singapore) Feng Tianwei (Singapore) Yu Mengyu	12	7	7	4	11	8		1	(China) Guo Yue (China) Li Xiaoxia	5	11	11	11	11
3	(China) Chen Meng (China) Zhu Yuling	8	6	11	12	4	11	9	2	(China) Ding Ning (China) Liu Shiwen	11	5	7	5	7
2	(China) Ding Ning (China) Liu Shiwen	11	11	5	10	11	8	11

=== Top half ===
==== Section 1 ====
First Round
1	(China) Y Guo (China) X Li	11	11	11	11
(Macau) CI Cheong (Macau) ON Leong	5	4	3	6
(Belarus) K Baravok (Belarus) A Privalova	11	7	10	4
22	(South Korea) S-H Park (South Korea) H-J Seok	13	11	12	11
18	(Czech Republic) D Čechová (Czech Republic) R Štrbíková	11	7	11	11	13
(Egypt) E-D Nadeen (Egypt) D Meshref	6	11	6	7	11
(Russia) O Baranova (Russia) Y Noskova	5	7	3	7
14	(Germany) K Silbereisen (Germany) J Wu	11	11	11	11
15	(North Korea) M-G Ri (North Korea) M-S Ri	9	11	11	7	11	11
(Lithuania) L Misikonyte (Lithuania) R Paškauskienė	11	5	6	11	8	6
(Australia) Z Dederko (Australia) JF Lay	13	5	7	9	11
29	(France) L Gasnier (France) YF Xian	11	11	11	11	13
30	(Romania) C Postoaca (Romania) B Szőcs	7	11	11	11	11
(Serbia) A Erdelji (Serbia) M Molnar	11	8	4	9	4
(Croatia) P Petek (Croatia) I Tubikaneć	6	12	2	6	12
7	(South Korea) Y-S Park (South Korea) H-E Yang	11	10	11	11	14

Second Round
1	(China) Y Guo (China) X Li	11	11	11	11
22	(South Korea) S-H Park (South Korea) H-J Seok	7	4	7	5
18	(Czech Republic) D Čechová (Czech Republic) R Štrbíková	5	7	11	6	7
14	(Germany) K Silbereisen (Germany) J Wu	11	11	9	11	11
15	(North Korea) M-G Ri (North Korea) M-S Ri	11	11	11	11
29	(France) L Gasnier (France) YF Xian	3	6	1	8
30	(Romania) C Postoaca (Romania) B Szőcs	9	10	11	9	11	13	5
7	(South Korea) Y-S Park (South Korea) H-E Yang	11	12	7	11	9	11	11

Third Round
1	(China) Y Guo (China) X Li	11	11	13	11
14	(Germany) K Silbereisen (Germany) J Wu	7	7	11	3
15	(North Korea) M-G Ri (North Korea) M-S Ri	4	12	6	9	11
7	(South Korea) Y-S Park (South Korea) H-E Yang	11	10	11	11	13

Quarterfinals
1	(China) Y Guo (China) X Li	11	11	11	11
7	(South Korea) Y-S Park (South Korea) H-E Yang	4	8	8	5

==== Section 2 ====
First Round
8	(North Korea) H-S Kim (North Korea) J Kim	11	8	11	8	11	4	3
(Thailand) N Komwong (Thailand) S Sawettabut	5	11	8	11	3	11	3
(Russia) A Savelyeva (Russia) E Troshneva	7	8	11	9	7
25	(Belarus) A Arlouskaya (Belarus) V Pavlovich	11	11	6	11	11
31	(Chinese Taipei) S-y Chen (Chinese Taipei) H-y Liu	11	11	7	12	10	11
(Croatia) L Rakovac (Croatia) Y Tian	8	7	11	10	12	8
(Belgium) E Loyen (Belgium) L Lung	7	4	8	8
13	(Japan) A Fukuhara (Japan) S Hirano	11	11	11	11
9	(Japan) J Ishikawa (Japan) M Morizono	11	11	11	11
(Indonesia) NA Agustin (Indonesia) S Rovani	5	7	9	5
(France) E Lennon (France) M Migot	11	9	9	7	11	14	11
19	(Spain) G Dvorak (Spain) S Ramírez	9	11	11	11	4	12	1
23	(Ukraine) T Bilenko (Ukraine) G Gaponova	11	11	11	8	6	11
(Thailand) T Khetkhuan (Thailand) A Muangsuk	5	9	4	11	11	9
(Italy) L Ridolfi (Italy) N Stefanova	11	8	6	8	7
4	(Singapore) T Feng (Singapore) M Yu	6	11	11	11	11

Second Round
8	(North Korea) H-S Kim (North Korea) J Kim	12	11	12	11	15
25	(Belarus) A Arlouskaya (Belarus) V Pavlovich	10	8	14	3	13
31	(Chinese Taipei) S-y Chen (Chinese Taipei) H-y Liu	5	11	7	8	4
13	(Japan) A Fukuhara (Japan) S Hirano	11	7	11	11	11
9	(Japan) J Ishikawa (Japan) M Morizono	11	11	11	11
(France) E Lennon (France) M Migot	5	4	9	8
23	(Ukraine) T Bilenko (Ukraine) G Gaponova	11	12	8	11	2	4	4
4	(Singapore) T Feng (Singapore) M Yu	5	10	11	7	11	11	11

Third Round
8	(North Korea) H-S Kim (North Korea) J Kim	4	9	8	8
13	(Japan) A Fukuhara (Japan) S Hirano	11	11	11	11
9	(Japan) J Ishikawa (Japan) M Morizono	7	5	7	11	7
4	(Singapore) T Feng (Singapore) M Yu	11	11	11	8	11

Quarterfinals
13	(Japan) A Fukuhara (Japan) S Hirano	7	6	3	8
4	(Singapore) T Feng (Singapore) M Yu	11	11	11	11

=== Bottom half ===
==== Section 3 ====
First Round
3	(China) M Chen (China) Y Zhu	11	11	11	9	13
(Bulgaria) K Gatinska (Bulgaria) S Remzi	4	4	4	11	11
(India) N Aggarwal (India) M Patkar	11	7	6	4	10
21	(Germany) Z Barthel (Germany) I Ivancan	6	11	11	11	12
20	(Czech Republic) K Pěnkavová (Czech Republic) I Vacenovská	11	11	9	11	11
(Indonesia) M Fitria (Indonesia) S Palit	8	5	11	8	2
(Slovakia) B Balážová (Slovakia) L Truskova	11	3	7	4	3
10	(Chinese Taipei) I-c Cheng (Chinese Taipei) Y-h Huang	9	11	11	11	11
12	(Hungary) G Póta (Hungary) K Tóth	11	11	11	11
(Greece) M Christoforaki (Greece) A Papadaki	5	6	8	3
(Luxembourg) T Gonderinger (Luxembourg) Y Ni	11	12	11	12	12	12
27	(Hong Kong) HK Doo (Hong Kong) CW Li	8	14	5	14	10	10
32	(France) A Abbat (France) C Grundisch	11	11	10	14	12
(Poland) M Pietkiewicz (Poland) A Szymańska	6	5	12	12	10
(Brazil) C Kumahara (Brazil) J Yamada	11	5	6	3	8
6	(Japan) H Fujii (Japan) M Wakamiya	6	11	11	11	11

Second Round
3	(China) M Chen (China) Y Zhu	11	11	11	11
21	(Germany) Z Barthel (Germany) I Ivancan	3	6	5	1
20	(Czech Republic) K Pěnkavová (Czech Republic) I Vacenovská	8	11	3	2	11
10	(Chinese Taipei) I-c Cheng (Chinese Taipei) Y-h Huang	11	9	11	11	13
12	(Hungary) G Póta (Hungary) K Tóth	11	12	11	3	11
(Luxembourg) T Gonderinger (Luxembourg) Y Ni	8	10	6	11	7
32	(France) A Abbat (France) C Grundisch	10	7	11	7	6
6	(Japan) H Fujii (Japan) M Wakamiya	12	11	9	11	11

Third Round
3	(China) M Chen (China) Y Zhu	5	11	11	11	11
10	(Chinese Taipei) I-c Cheng (Chinese Taipei) Y-h Huang	11	6	9	5	7
12	(Hungary) G Póta (Hungary) K Tóth	11	11	4	13	11	9	5
6	(Japan) H Fujii (Japan) M Wakamiya	7	13	11	11	3	11	11

Quarterfinals
3	(China) M Chen (China) Y Zhu	11	11	12	11
6	(Japan) H Fujii (Japan) M Wakamiya	9	8	10	7

==== Section 4 ====
First Round
5	(Hong Kong) H Jiang (Hong Kong) HC Lee	11	11	11	11
(Portugal) C Martins (Portugal) A Neves	3	4	5	6
(Russia) M Dolgikh (Russia) P Mikhailova	11	11	11	11
28	(United States) A Hsing (United States) L Zhang	8	3	3	3
17	(Poland) K Grzybowska (Poland) N Partyka	10	11	11	11	13
(Iran) M Omrani (Iran) N Shahsavari	12	4	2	4	11
(Switzerland) R Aschwanden (Switzerland) R Moret	6	4	11	4	9
16	(Germany) P Solja (Germany) S Winter	11	11	9	11	11
11	(Romania) D Dodean (Romania) E Samara	11	11	11	11
(Malaysia) LW Beh (Malaysia) LW WN	7	3	4	9
(Wales) C Carey (Wales) N Owen	8	8	4	11	15	11	8
26	(Hong Kong) M Guan (Hong Kong) WN Ng	11	11	11	5	13	9	11
24	(Hungary) P Lovas (Hungary) S Pergel	11	11	10	12	11
(England) J Parker (England) K Sibley	6	5	12	10	4
(South Korea) Y-J Jo (South Korea) E-C Yoo	3	3	1	10
2	(China) N Ding (China) S Liu	11	11	11	12

Second Round
5	(Hong Kong) H Jiang (Hong Kong) HC Lee	11	3	11	11	11
(Russia) M Dolgikh (Russia) P Mikhailova	8	11	7	5	6
17	(Poland) K Grzybowska (Poland) N Partyka	11	8	12	11	9	11
16	(Germany) P Solja (Germany) S Winter	9	11	10	8	11	9
11	(Romania) D Dodean (Romania) E Samara	7	12	8	11	11	11	6
26	(Hong Kong) M Guan (Hong Kong) WN Ng	11	14	11	8	6	8	11
24	(Hungary) P Lovas (Hungary) S Pergel	6	4	17	9
2	(China) N Ding (China) S Liu	11	11	19	11

Third Round
5	(Hong Kong) H Jiang (Hong Kong) HC Lee	5	10	11	11	13	15
17	(Poland) K Grzybowska (Poland) N Partyka	11	12	6	5	11	13
26	(Hong Kong) M Guan (Hong Kong) WN Ng	4	5	6	5
2	(China) N Ding (China) S Liu	11	11	11	11

Quarterfinals
5	(Hong Kong) H Jiang (Hong Kong) HC Lee	11	5	6	3	9
2	(China) N Ding (China) S Liu	8	11	11	11	11

== See also ==
List of World Table Tennis Championships medalists
