= 2013 World Table Tennis Championships – Mixed doubles =

Mixed double tennis championship

Mixed doubles at the 2013 World Table Tennis Championships
- Venue: Palais Omnisports de Paris-Bercy
- Location: Paris, France
- Dates: 14–18 May
- Final score: 11–6, 11–8, 11–3, 6–11, 8–11, 11–7

Medalists
gold medal	Kim Hyok-bong; Kim Jong	North Korea
silver medal	Lee Sang-su; Park Young-sook	South Korea
bronze medal	Wang Liqin; Rao Jingwen	China
bronze medal	Cheung Yuk; Jiang Huajun	Hong Kong

The 2013 World Table Tennis Championships mixed doubles was the 52nd edition of the mixed doubles championship.

Zhang Chao and Cao Zhen were the defending champions.
Kim Hyok-Bong and Kim Jong defeated Lee Sang-Su and Park Young-Sook 11–6, 11–8, 11–3, 6–11, 8–11, 11–7 in the final to win the title.

== Seeds ==
Doubles matches will be best of 5 games in qualification matches and best of 7 games in the 128-player sized main draw.

1. (China) Wang Liqin / (China) Rao Jingwen (semifinals)
2. (China) Qiu Yike / (China) Wen Jia (fourth round)
3. (Singapore) Gao Ning / (Singapore) Feng Tianwei (third round)
4. (China) Chen Qi / (China) Hu Limei (fourth round)
5. (Hong Kong) Cheung Yuk / (Hong Kong) Jiang Huajun (semifinals)
6. (North Korea) Kim Hyok-Bong / (North Korea) Kim Jong (champions)
7. (Japan) Seiya Kishikawa / (Japan) Ai Fukuhara (third round)
8. (South Korea) Seo Hyun-Deok / (South Korea) Seok Ha-Jung (fourth round)
9. (Hong Kong) Jiang Tianyi / (Hong Kong) Lee Ho Ching (quarterfinals)
10. (Japan) Kenji Matsudaira / (Japan) Misako Wakamiya (fourth round)
11. (Singapore) Yang Zi / (Singapore) Yu Mengyu (fourth round)
12. (Japan) Maharu Yoshimura / (Japan) Kasumi Ishikawa (third round)
13. (Chinese Taipei) Chen Chien-an / (Chinese Taipei) Huang Yi-hua (quarterfinals)
14. (South Korea) Cho Eon-Rae / (South Korea) Yang Ha-Eun (quarterfinals)
15. (Hong Kong) Tang Peng / (Hong Kong) Ng Wing Nam (fourth round)
16. (Romania) Andrei Filimon / (Romania) Elizabeta Samara (second round)
17. (Turkey) Bora Vang / (Turkey) Melek Hu (quarterfinals)
18. (Belarus) Pavel Platonaw / (Belarus) Aleksandra Privalova (third round)
19. (Romania) Adrian Crișan / (Romania) Daniela Dodean (third round)
20. (Spain) Carlos Machado / (Spain) Shen Yanfei (second round)
21. (Romania) Ovidiu Ionescu / (Romania) Bernadette Szőcs (third round)
22. (Germany) Patrick Franziska / (Germany) Petrissa Solja (third round)
23. (South Korea) Lee Sang-Su / (South Korea) Park Young-Sook (final)
24. (Hungary) Ádám Pattantyús / (Hungary) Georgina Póta (second round)
25. (Spain) He Zhi Wen / (Spain) Sara Ramirez (third round)
26. (France) Adrien Mattenet / (France) Alice Abbat (third round)
27. (Poland) Daniel Gorak / (Poland) Natalia Partyka (second round)
28. (Czech Republic) Lubomir Jančárik / (Czech Republic) Iveta Vacenovská (third round)
29. (Russia) Alexander Shibaev / (Russia) Elena Troshneva (second round)
30. (Czech Republic) Dmitrij Prokopcov / (Czech Republic) Renáta Štrbíková (second round)
31. (France) Emmanuel Lebesson / (France) Carole Grundisch (third round)
32. (Brazil) Cazuo Matsumoto / (Brazil) Caroline Kumahara (second round)
33. (Chinese Taipei) Chiang Hung-chieh / (Chinese Taipei) Cheng I-ching (second round)
34. (Italy) Mihai Bobocica / (Italy) Nikoleta Stefanova (second round)
35. (Chinese Taipei) Wu Chih-chi / (Chinese Taipei) Chen Szu-yu (second round)
36. (Serbia) Marko Jevtović / (Serbia) Anamaria Erdelji (first round)
37. (Russia) Mikhail Paykov / (Russia) Yana Noskova (second round)
38. (Ukraine) Oleksandr Didukh / (Ukraine) Tetyana Bolenko (second round)
39. (Egypt) Omar Assar / (Egypt) Dina Meshref (second round)
40. (Sweden) Mattias Karlsson / (Sweden) Matilda Ekholm (second round)
41. (Hungary) János Jakab / (Hungary) Szandra Pergel (second round)
42. (Ukraine) Kou Lei / (Ukraine) Ganna Gaponova (second round)
43. (India) Sharath Kamal / (India) Shamini Kumaresan (second round)
44. (Egypt) El-sayed Lashin / (Egypt) Nadeen El-Dawlatly (second round)
45. (Germany) Steffen Mengel / (Germany) Sabine Winter (second round)
46. (France) Simon Gauzy / (France) Laura Gasnier (second round)
47. (Spain) Marc Duran / (Spain) Galia Dvorak (third round)
48. (Slovakia) Lubomir Pistej / (Slovakia) Barbora Balážová (fourth round)
49. (Hungary) Daniel Kosiba / (Hungary) Dora Madarász (third round)
50. (Brazil) Gustavo Tsuboi / (Brazil) Jessica Yamada (third round)
51. (Croatia) Tomislav Kolarek / (Croatia) Lea Rakovac (second round)
52. (England) Liam Pitchford / (England) Kelly Sibley (second round)
53. (Ukraine) Yevhen Pryshchepa / (Ukraine) Margaryta Pesotska (second round)
54. (Serbia) Žolt Pete / (Serbia) Monika Molnar (first round)
55. (Brazil) Thiago Monteiro / (Brazil) Lígia Silva (second round)
56. (North Korea) Kim Nam-Chol / (North Korea) Kim Hye-Song (second round)
57. (North Korea) Pak Sin-Hyok / (North Korea) Ri Mi-Gyong (third round)
58. (Russia) Alexey Liventsov / (Russia) Antonina Savelyeva (second round)
59. (Poland) Robert Floras / (Poland) Monika Pietkiewicz (second round)
60. (Mexico) Marcos Madrid / (Mexico) Yadira Silva (first round)
61. (India) Soumyajit Ghosh / (India) Mouma Das (third round)
62. (India) Amalraj Anthony / (India) Madhurika Patkar (second round)
63. (Poland) Pawel Fertikowski / (Poland) Katarzyna Grzybowska (fourth round)

== Draw ==
=== Key ===
- Q = Qualifier
- w/o = Walkover
- w/d = Withdraw
- r = Retired
- DQ = Disqualified

=== Finals ===
Quarterfinals
1	(China) Wang Liqin (China) Rao Jingwen	11	11	10	11	8	8	11
17	(Turkey) Bora Vang (Turkey) Melek Hu	8	6	12	6	11	11	4
13	(Chinese Taipei) Chen Chien-an (Chinese Taipei) Huang Yi-hua	10	11	7	6	11	3
23	(South Korea) Lee Sang-Su (South Korea) Park Young-Sook	12	4	11	11	9	11
14	(South Korea) Cho Eon-Rae (South Korea) Yang Ha-Eun	5	9	8	11	3
6	(North Korea) Kim Hyok-Bong (North Korea) Kim Jong	11	11	11	6	11
5	(Hong Kong) Cheung Yuk (Hong Kong) Jiang Huajun	9	10	11	4	11	12	11
9	(Hong Kong) Jiang Tianyi (Hong Kong) Lee Ho Ching	11	12	6	11	6	10	8

Semifinals
1	(China) Wang Liqin (China) Rao Jingwen	9	8	4	11	8
23	(South Korea) Lee Sang-Su (South Korea) Park Young-Sook	11	11	11	8	11
6	(North Korea) Kim Hyok-Bong (North Korea) Kim Jong	11	9	12	14	11	11	11
5	(Hong Kong) Cheung Yuk (Hong Kong) Jiang Huajun	13	11	14	12	8	4	7

Final
23	(South Korea) Lee Sang-Su (South Korea) Park Young-Sook	6	8	3	11	11	7
6	(North Korea) Kim Hyok-Bong (North Korea) Kim Jong	11	11	11	6	8	11

=== Top half ===
==== Section 1 ====
First Round
1	(China) L Wang (China) J Rao	11	11	11	11
(Laos) T Phathaphone (Laos) T Southammavong	3	6	6	5
(Lithuania) A Udra (Lithuania) E Stuckyte	9	3	9	11	3
59	(Poland) R Floras (Poland) M Pietkiewicz	11	11	11	7	11
49	(Hungary) D Kosiba (Hungary) D Madarász	13	13	10	8	11	11
(Bosnia and Herzegovina) A Duranspahic (Bosnia and Herzegovina) E Hadžiahmetović	11	11	12	11	9	4
(Estonia) A Smirnov (Estonia) T Tsistjakova	6	4	8	7
30	(Czech Republic) D Prokopcov (Czech Republic) R Štrbíková	11	11	11	11
22	(Germany) P Franziska (Germany) P Solja	11	11	11	11
(Kazakhstan) K Gerassimenko (Kazakhstan) Y Gats	6	5	6	2
(United States) Y Zhang (United States) E Wu	11	11	11	4	11	2	7
43	(India) S Kamal (India) S Kumaresan	7	13	7	11	9	11	11
63	(Poland) P Fertikowski (Poland) K Grzybowska	11	11	11	11
(Chile) M Contreras (Chile) P Vega	5	8	3	9
(United States) K Nguyen (United States) A Hsing	5	6	8	11	6
16	(Romania) A Filimon (Romania) E Samara	11	11	11	9	11

Second Round
1	(China) L Wang (China) J Rao	7	11	11	11	12
59	(Poland) R Floras (Poland) M Pietkiewicz	11	8	4	6	10
49	(Hungary) D Kosiba (Hungary) D Madarász	11	6	11	6	11	11
30	(Czech Republic) D Prokopcov (Czech Republic) R Štrbíková	7	11	9	11	5	8
22	(Germany) P Franziska (Germany) P Solja	11	11	11	11
43	(India) S Kamal (India) S Kumaresan	7	4	7	9
63	(Poland) P Fertikowski (Poland) K Grzybowska	16	11	11	13
16	(Romania) A Filimon (Romania) E Samara	14	8	7	11

Third Round
1	(China) L Wang (China) J Rao	11	11	11	11
49	(Hungary) D Kosiba (Hungary) D Madarász	8	7	8	8
22	(Germany) P Franziska (Germany) P Solja	3	10	11	11	11	4	5
63	(Poland) P Fertikowski (Poland) K Grzybowska	11	12	7	7	8	11	11

Fourth Round
1	(China) L Wang (China) J Rao	10	11	4	11	12	11
63	(Poland) P Fertikowski (Poland) K Grzybowska	12	5	11	7	10	5

==== Section 2 ====
First Round
11	(Singapore) Z Yang (Singapore) M Yu	11	11	11	12
(Argentina) G Alto (Argentina) A Iwasa	6	5	5	10
(Lithuania) K Žeimys (Lithuania) R Paškauskienė	4	9	6	11	11	7
42	(Ukraine) K Lei (Ukraine) G Gaponova	11	11	11	6	7	11
(Greece) K Papageorgiou (Greece) A Papadaki	11	11	8	11	11
(Uruguay) G Lorenzotti (Uruguay) M Lorenzotti	9	2	11	2	6
(Colombia) A Echavarria (Colombia) P Medina	9	6	12	3	8
18	(Belarus) P Platonaw (Belarus) A Privalova	11	11	10	11	11
17	(Turkey) B Vang (Turkey) M Hu	12	11	11	11
(Slovakia) J Figel (Slovakia) E Jurková	10	3	4	3
(Singapore) ZYC Chew (Singapore) IS Li	4	4	6	4
41	(Hungary) J Jakab (Hungary) S Pergel	11	11	11	11
34	(Italy) M Bobocica (Italy) N Stefanova	7	11	11	11	7	11
(Belarus) K Barabanov (Belarus) K Baravok	11	6	3	9	11	8
(Italy) M Rech Daldosso (Italy) D Vivarelli	11	4	3	3	9
7	(Japan) S Kishikawa (Japan) A Fukuhara	7	11	11	11	11

Second Round
11	(Singapore) Z Yang (Singapore) M Yu	11	11	11	11	11
42	(Ukraine) K Lei (Ukraine) G Gaponova	3	5	13	6	9
(Greece) K Papageorgiou (Greece) A Papadaki	12	5	3	8	3
18	(Belarus) P Platonaw (Belarus) A Privalova	10	11	11	11	11
17	(Turkey) B Vang (Turkey) M Hu	11	12	11	11	8	12
41	(Hungary) J Jakab (Hungary) S Pergel	9	14	4	7	11	10
34	(Italy) M Bobocica (Italy) N Stefanova	5	11	5	7	8
7	(Japan) S Kishikawa (Japan) A Fukuhara	11	5	11	11	11

Third Round
11	(Singapore) Z Yang (Singapore) M Yu	8	11	11	11	9	11
18	(Belarus) P Platonaw (Belarus) A Privalova	11	2	8	2	11	4
17	(Turkey) B Vang (Turkey) M Hu	11	6	11	11	11
7	(Japan) S Kishikawa (Japan) A Fukuhara	9	11	8	7	8

Fourth Round
11	(Singapore) Z Yang (Singapore) M Yu	8	11	4	11	9	7
17	(Turkey) B Vang (Turkey) M Hu	11	9	11	3	11	11

==== Section 3 ====
First Round
8	(South Korea) H-D Seo (South Korea) H-J Seok	11	11	11	11
(Indonesia) D Haruri (Indonesia) S Rovani	7	4	5	6
(Chile) F Olivares (Chile) J Morales	6	7	9	4
40	(Sweden) M Karlsson (Sweden) M Ekholm	11	11	11	11
53	(Ukraine) Y Pryshchepa (Ukraine) M Pesotska	w/o
(Republic of the Congo) S Saka (Republic of the Congo) X Han
(Bulgaria) P Krastev (Bulgaria) A Karova	5	1	8	4
28	(Czech Republic) L Jančárik (Czech Republic) I Vacenovská	11	11	11	11
25	(Spain) ZW He (Spain) S Ramirez	11	11	11	11
(Venezuela) J Pino (Venezuela) C Rivas	9	7	2	4
(Bulgaria) P Gabrovski (Bulgaria) K Gatinska	6	11	6	6	3
35	(Chinese Taipei) C-c Wu (Chinese Taipei) S-y Chen	11	6	11	11	11
46	(France) S Gauzy (France) L Gasnier	11	11	11	11
(Cameroon) H Matam (Cameroon) S Hanffou	3	4	5	3
(Israel) R Davidovitz (Israel) N Ruvman	6	12	4	11	6	3
13	(Chinese Taipei) C-a Chen (Chinese Taipei) Y-h Huang	11	10	11	8	11	11

Second Round
8	(South Korea) H-D Seo (South Korea) H-J Seok	11	11	11	9	11	5	11
40	(Sweden) M Karlsson (Sweden) M Ekholm	5	1	13	11	6	11	4
53	(Ukraine) Y Pryshchepa (Ukraine) M Pesotska	6	9	11	11	8	5
28	(Czech Republic) L Jančárik (Czech Republic) I Vacenovská	11	11	8	7	11	11
25	(Spain) ZW He (Spain) S Ramirez	11	11	8	11	11
35	(Chinese Taipei) C-c Wu (Chinese Taipei) S-y Chen	6	9	11	6	4
46	(France) S Gauzy (France) L Gasnier	8	6	9	11	11	6
13	(Chinese Taipei) C-a Chen (Chinese Taipei) Y-h Huang	11	11	11	8	4	11

Third Round
8	(South Korea) H-D Seo (South Korea) H-J Seok	11	9	9	11	11	11
28	(Czech Republic) L Jančárik (Czech Republic) I Vacenovská	2	11	11	8	5	2
25	(Spain) ZW He (Spain) S Ramirez	11	9	11	13	9	3	7
13	(Chinese Taipei) C-a Chen (Chinese Taipei) Y-h Huang	7	11	9	11	11	11	11

Fourth Round
8	(South Korea) H-D Seo (South Korea) H-J Seok	7	11	7	8	14	11	8
13	(Chinese Taipei) C-a Chen (Chinese Taipei) Y-h Huang	11	5	11	11	12	6	11

==== Section 4 ====
First Round
12	(Japan) M Yoshimura (Japan) K Ishikawa	11	11	11	11
(Guatemala) JM Ramírez (Guatemala) A Estrada	7	2	1	4
(Serbia) B Milošević (Serbia) A Todorović	11	8	12	6	11	5	4
62	(India) A Anthony (India) M Patkar	9	11	10	11	9	11	11
36	(Serbia) M Jevtović (Serbia) A Erdelji	10	11	7	11	11	6	6
(Switzerland) N Mohler (Switzerland) R Moret	12	7	11	5	6	11	11
(Croatia) F Željko (Croatia) P Petek	2	4	3	9
23	(South Korea) S-S Lee (South Korea) Y-S Park	11	11	11	11
20	(Spain) C Machado (Spain) Y Shen	11	11	11	11
(Scotland) C Howieson (Scotland) L Flaws	3	6	6	7
(Colombia) J Salazar (Colombia) J Araque	6	3	2	7
48	(Slovakia) L Pistej (Slovakia) B Balážová	11	11	11	11
51	(Croatia) T Kolarek (Croatia) L Rakovac	w/o
(Nigeria) Q Aruna (Nigeria) O Edem
(Argentina) S Liu (Argentina) A Codina	11	3	5	2	12
3	(Singapore) N Gao (Singapore) T Feng	9	11	11	11	14

Second Round
12	(Japan) M Yoshimura (Japan) K Ishikawa	11	9	11	11	8	11
62	(India) A Anthony (India) M Patkar	4	11	7	5	11	6
(Switzerland) N Mohler (Switzerland) R Moret	9	11	6	5	14	2
23	(South Korea) S-S Lee (South Korea) Y-S Park	11	5	11	11	12	11
20	(Spain) C Machado (Spain) Y Shen	5	4	4	12	5
48	(Slovakia) L Pistej (Slovakia) B Balážová	11	11	11	10	11
51	(Croatia) T Kolarek (Croatia) L Rakovac	11	5	11	13	8	9
3	(Singapore) N Gao (Singapore) T Feng	3	11	4	15	11	11

Third Round
12	(Japan) M Yoshimura (Japan) K Ishikawa	11	5	11	5	9
23	(South Korea) S-S Lee (South Korea) Y-S Park	8	11	13	11	11
48	(Slovakia) L Pistej (Slovakia) B Balážová	9	11	11	7	5	11	14
3	(Singapore) N Gao (Singapore) T Feng	11	5	8	11	11	4	12

Fourth Round
23	(South Korea) S-S Lee (South Korea) Y-S Park	8	11	12	11	17
48	(Slovakia) L Pistej (Slovakia) B Balážová	11	7	10	8	15

=== Bottom half ===
==== Section 5 ====
First Round
4	(China) Q Chen (China) L Hu	13	11	11	11
(Argentina) P Tabachnik (Argentina) C Arguelles	11	7	9	6
(Estonia) V Vainula (Estonia) O Ketsko	6	9	11	5	6
45	(Germany) S Mengel (Germany) S Winter	11	11	9	11	11
44	(Egypt) E-s Lashin (Egypt) N El-Dawlatly	11	11	11	9	11
(Moldova) V Dubrovin (Moldova) O Bliznet	8	8	9	11	8
(Trinidad and Tobago) D St. Louis (Trinidad and Tobago) R Chung	12	9	11	10
26	(France) A Mattenet (France) A Abbat	14	11	13	12
27	(Poland) D Gorak (Poland) N Partyka	14	11	11	7	11
(Denmark) M Hindersson (Denmark) M Jacobsen	12	7	8	11	2
(Slovenia) S Lasan (Slovenia) A Galič	2	7	8	11	6
57	(North Korea) S-H Pak (North Korea) M-G Ri	11	11	11	8	11
54	(Serbia) Ž Pete (Serbia) M Molnar	9	1	3	11	11	11	7
(Thailand) M Poungsri (Thailand) T Khetkhuan	11	11	11	9	2	4	11
(Malaysia) MS Ibrahim (Malaysia) LW Beh	11	8	7	9
14	(South Korea) E-R Cho (South Korea) H-E Yang	13	11	11	11

Second Round
4	(China) Q Chen (China) L Hu	11	9	11	10	11	8	11
45	(Germany) S Mengel (Germany) S Winter	4	11	7	12	9	11	7
44	(Egypt) E-s Lashin (Egypt) N El-Dawlatly	11	9	7	6
26	(France) A Mattenet (France) A Abbat	13	11	11	11
27	(Poland) D Gorak (Poland) N Partyka	7	12	3	2	1
57	(North Korea) S-H Pak (North Korea) M-G Ri	11	10	11	11	11
(Thailand) M Poungsri (Thailand) T Khetkhuan	2	10	7	7
14	(South Korea) E-R Cho (South Korea) H-E Yang	11	12	11	11

Third Round
4	(China) Q Chen (China) L Hu	11	11	11	11
26	(France) A Mattenet (France) A Abbat	6	6	4	3
57	(North Korea) S-H Pak (North Korea) M-G Ri	11	11	4	6	4	11	5
14	(South Korea) E-R Cho (South Korea) H-E Yang	6	7	11	11	11	6	11

Fourth Round
4	(China) Q Chen (China) L Hu	8	5	11	11	6	12	8
14	(South Korea) E-R Cho (South Korea) H-E Yang	11	11	2	8	11	10	11

==== Section 6 ====
First Round
10	(Japan) K Matsudaira (Japan) M Wakamiya	11	11	11	11
(New Zealand) J Cordue (New Zealand) S Her-Lee	4	2	6	4
(Kazakhstan) D Zholudev (Kazakhstan) N Sladkova	7	3	4	6
56	(North Korea) N-C Kim (North Korea) H-S Kim	11	11	11	11
52	(England) L Pitchford (England) K Sibley	11	10	11	11	11
(Slovenia) J Zibrat (Slovenia) M Fajmut	9	12	8	8	7
(Finland) O Tennila (Finland) J Oksanen	2	5	11	7	4
21	(Romania) O Ionescu (Romania) B Szőcs	11	11	9	11	11
31	(France) E Lebesson (France) C Grundisch	11	11	11	11
(Denmark) M Rasmussen (Denmark) P Agerholm	6	4	9	3
(United States) T Wang (United States) L Zhang	6	8	11	11	6	7
38	(Ukraine) O Didukh (Ukraine) T Bolenko	11	11	4	8	11	11
58	(Russia) A Liventsov (Russia) A Savelyeva	w/o
(Wales) R Jenkins (Wales) N Owen
(Greece) K Lagogiannis (Greece) F Exarchou	4	4	7	7
6	(North Korea) H-B Kim (North Korea) J Kim	11	11	11	11

Second Round
10	(Japan) K Matsudaira (Japan) M Wakamiya	11	10	3	11	11	11
56	(North Korea) N-C Kim (North Korea) H-S Kim	4	12	11	8	8	9
52	(England) L Pitchford (England) K Sibley	11	11	6	7	7	7
21	(Romania) O Ionescu (Romania) B Szőcs	3	8	11	11	11	11
31	(France) E Lebesson (France) C Grundisch	9	10	7	11	11	11	11
38	(Ukraine) O Didukh (Ukraine) T Bolenko	11	12	11	7	7	7	5
58	(Russia) A Liventsov (Russia) A Savelyeva	12	4	7	7
6	(North Korea) H-B Kim (North Korea) J Kim	14	11	11	11

Third Round
10	(Japan) K Matsudaira (Japan) M Wakamiya	11	11	11	5	11
21	(Romania) O Ionescu (Romania) B Szőcs	7	7	9	11	9
31	(France) E Lebesson (France) C Grundisch	11	10	4	6	11	6
6	(North Korea) H-B Kim (North Korea) J Kim	8	12	11	11	9	11

Fourth Round
10	(Japan) K Matsudaira (Japan) M Wakamiya	11	11	6	7	6	7
6	(North Korea) H-B Kim (North Korea) J Kim	5	2	11	11	11	11

==== Section 7 ====
First Round
5	(Hong Kong) C Yuk (Hong Kong) J Huajun	11	11	11	11
(Czech Republic) M Obeslo (Czech Republic) H Matelová	8	5	4	5
(Slovenia) U Slatinsek (Slovenia) J Tomazini	8	7	15	11	11	11
60	(Mexico) M Madrid (Mexico) Y Silva	11	11	13	9	5	7
37	(Russia) M Paykov (Russia) Y Noskova	11	11	16	11
(Luxembourg) G Michely (Luxembourg) S de Nutte	7	14	6	2
(Norway) E Ronneberg (Norway) M Aasebo	2	7	8	5
19	(Romania) A Crișan (Romania) D Dodean	11	11	11	11
29	(Russia) A Shibaev (Russia) E Troshneva	11	11	11	15
(Thailand) P Tanviriyavechakul (Thailand) S Sawettabut	8	4	7	13
(Egypt) A Saleh (Egypt) F Abdel-Aziz	3	11	8	6	13	11	5
61	(India) S Ghosh (India) M Das	11	4	11	11	11	5	11
55	(Brazil) T Monteiro (Brazil) L Silva	8	11	11	4	12	11
(England) S Walker (England) J Parker	11	9	9	11	10	5
(Canada) P-Luc Thériault (Canada) A Luo	12	9	5	6	1
15	(Hong Kong) Peng T (Hong Kong) NW Nam	10	11	11	11	11

Second Round
5	(Hong Kong) C Yuk (Hong Kong) J Huajun	11	11	11	10	11
(Slovenia) U Slatinsek (Slovenia) J Tomazini	6	6	4	12	5
37	(Russia) M Paykov (Russia) Y Noskova	10	9	9	6
19	(Romania) A Crișan (Romania) D Dodean	12	11	11	11
29	(Russia) A Shibaev (Russia) E Troshneva	14	9	8	11	8
61	(India) S Ghosh (India) M Das	16	11	11	8	11
55	(Brazil) T Monteiro (Brazil) L Silva	6	5	7	11	7
15	(Hong Kong) Peng T (Hong Kong) NW Nam	11	11	11	7	11

Third Round
5	(Hong Kong) C Yuk (Hong Kong) J Huajun	11	9	10	11	12	11	15
19	(Romania) A Crișan (Romania) D Dodean	7	11	12	8	14	7	13
61	(India) S Ghosh (India) M Das	8	11	8	14	9	7
15	(Hong Kong) Peng T (Hong Kong) NW Nam	11	7	11	12	11	11

Fourth Round
5	(Hong Kong) C Yuk (Hong Kong) J Huajun	14	11	11	11	11	11
15	(Hong Kong) Peng T (Hong Kong) NW Nam	16	8	9	13	5	9

==== Section 8 ====
First Round
9	(Hong Kong) T Jiang (Hong Kong) HC Lee	11	11	11	11
(Bulgaria) S Golovanov (Bulgaria) S Remzi	6	7	6	8
(Italy) L Mutti (Italy) R Lisa	5	11	4	8	11	6
33	(Chinese Taipei) H-c Chiang (Chinese Taipei) I-c Cheng	11	9	11	11	5	11
47	(Spain) M Duran (Spain) G Dvorak	11	6	11	11	11	11
(Indonesia) Y Mardiyono (Indonesia) NA Agustin	5	11	9	13	9	9
(Scotland) G Rumgay (Scotland) G Edwards	8	13	5	3
32	(Brazil) C Matsumoto (Brazil) C Kumahara	11	15	11	11
24	(Hungary) A Pattantyús (Hungary) G Póta	11	9	11	11	11
(Lithuania) T Mikutis (Lithuania) L Misikonyte	5	11	9	6	7
(Sri Lanka) R Sirisena (Sri Lanka) I Madurangi	8	5	14	7
50	(Brazil) G Tsuboi (Brazil) J Yamada	11	11	16	11
39	(Egypt) O Assar (Egypt) D Meshref	11	11	11	11
(Venezuela) M Navas (Venezuela) G Arvelo	9	8	2	4
(Turkey) G Menge (Turkey) İ Karahan	6	3	8	6
2	(China) Y Qiu (China) J Wen	11	11	11	11

Second Round
9	(Hong Kong) T Jiang (Hong Kong) HC Lee	11	11	12	11
33	(Chinese Taipei) H-c Chiang (Chinese Taipei) I-c Cheng	5	4	10	8
47	(Spain) M Duran (Spain) G Dvorak	11	11	11	11
32	(Brazil) C Matsumoto (Brazil) C Kumahara	6	6	7	7
24	(Hungary) A Pattantyús (Hungary) G Póta	11	7	10	11	4	11	10
50	(Brazil) G Tsuboi (Brazil) J Yamada	5	11	12	8	11	8	12
39	(Egypt) O Assar (Egypt) D Meshref	11	12	4	11	4	11	3
2	(China) Y Qiu (China) J Wen	8	14	11	9	11	8	11

Third Round
9	(Hong Kong) T Jiang (Hong Kong) HC Lee	15	11	8	11	11
47	(Spain) M Duran (Spain) G Dvorak	13	6	11	9	9
50	(Brazil) G Tsuboi (Brazil) J Yamada	5	5	13	6	7
2	(China) Y Qiu (China) J Wen	11	11	11	11	11

Fourth Round
9	(Hong Kong) T Jiang (Hong Kong) HC Lee	11	1	11	7	11	12
2	(China) Y Qiu (China) J Wen	7	11	5	11	5	10
