= Table tennis at the 2015 European Games – Women's team =

Women's team at the 2015 European Games
- Venue: Baku Crystal Hall
- Dates: 13–15 June
- Competitors: 48 from 16 nations

Medalists
gold medal	Germany; Shan Xiaona, Han Ying, Petrissa Solja
silver medal	Netherlands; Li Jiao, Li Jie, Britt Eerland
bronze medal	Czech Republic; Renáta Štrbíková, Iveta Vacenovská, Hana Matelová

The women's team in table tennis at the 2015 European Games in Baku was the 1st edition of the event in a European Games It was held at the Baku Crystal Hall from 13 to 15 June 2015.

== Result ==
First round
Germany	3
Hungary	0
Portugal	1
Russia	3
France	3
Azerbaijan	0
Czech Republic	3
Austria	1
Ukraine	3
Belarus	1
Sweden	3
Romania	1
Poland	3
Luxembourg	1
Serbia	0
Netherlands	3

Quarterfinals
Germany	3
Russia	0
France	1
Czech Republic	3
Ukraine	3
Sweden	0
Poland	2
Netherlands	3

Semifinals
Germany	3
Czech Republic	0
Ukraine	2
Netherlands	3

Gold Medal Match
Germany	3
Netherlands	2
Bronze Medal Match
Czech Republic	3
Ukraine	1

=== First round ===
13 June 2015	Germany	3 – 0	Hungary

Shan Xiaona	3–1	Dóra Madarász	11–6, 11–5, 12–14, 11–7
Han Ying	3–0	Georgina Póta	11–4, 11–2, 11–5
Petrissa Solja / Shan Xiaona	3–1	Szandra Pergel / Dóra Madarász	7–11, 11–4, 11–8 , 13–11

13 June 2015	Portugal	1 – 3	Russia

Yu Fu	3–1	Anna Tikhomirova	11–8, 10–12, 11–4, 11–9
Leila Oliveira	0–3	Polina Mikhailova	7–11, 7–11, 7–11
Ana Neves / Leila Oliveira	1–3	Yana Noskova / Anna Tikhomirova	9–11, 11–9, 5–11, 4–11
Ana Neves	0–3	Polina Mikhailova	6–11, 7–11, 5–11

13 June 2015	France	3 – 0	Azerbaijan

Li Xue	3–0	Rufat Guliyeva	11–2, 11–3, 11–8
Carole Grundisch	3–0	Maryam Imanova	11–5, 11–5, 11–3
Xian Yifang / Li Xue	3–0	Sharmin Shirinova / Rufat Guliyeva	11–3, 11–5 , 11–5

13 June 2015	Czech Republic	3 – 1	Austria

Renáta Štrbíková	3–1	Sofia Polcanova	11–8, 11–7, 7–11, 11–7
Iveta Vacenovská	3–1	Liu Jia	11–9, 12–10, 11–13, 11–8
Hana Matelová / Renáta Štrbíková	2–3	Li Qiangbing / Sofia Polcanova	9–11, 15-17, 18-16, 11–5, 5–11
Hana Matelová	3–0	Liu Jia	11–7, 12–10, 11–9

13 June 2015	Ukraine	3 – 1	Belarus

Margaryta Pesotska	3–1	Katsiaryna Baravok	11–4, 11–7, 7–11, 11–1
Ganna Gaponova	2–3	Alexandra Privalova	10–12, 12–10, 6–11, 11–8, 7–11
Tetyana Bilenko / Ganna Gaponova	3–1	Alina Arlouskaya / Katsiaryna Baravok	11–9, 9–11, 11–5, 13–11
Tetyana Bilenko	3–0	Alexandra Privalova	11–5, 11–4, 11–6

13 June 2015	Sweden	3 – 1	Romania

Linda Bergström	3–1	Camelia Poştoacă	11–7, 11–8, 9–11, 11–9
Matilda Ekholm	3–0	Elizabeta Samara	11–8, 11–7, 11–6
Daniela Moskovits / Linda Bergström	0–3	Bernadette Szőcs / Camelia Poştoacă	9–11, 6–11, 9–11
Matilda Ekholm	3–2	Bernadette Szőcs	11–9, 5–11, 11–4, 9–11, 11–7

13 June 2015	Poland	3 – 1	Luxembourg

Li Qian	3–0	Sarah de Nutte	11–7, 11–4, 11–7
Katarzyna Grzybowska	1–3	Ni Xialian	9–11, 11–8, 8–11, 13–11, 8–11
Natalia Partyka / Katarzyna Grzybowska	3–0	Danielle Konsbruck / Sarah de Nutte	11–7, 11–3, 11–5
Li Qian	3–0	Danielle Konsbruck	11–4, 11–2, 11–5

13 June 2015	Serbia	0 – 3	Netherlands

Gabriela Feher	0–3	Li Jiao	9–11, 5–11, 10–12
Anamaria Erdelji	0–3	Li Jie	10–12, 6–11, 8–11
Andrea Todorović / Gabriela Feher	1–3	Britt Eerland / Li Jiao	10–12, 11–7, 10–12, 2–11

=== Quarterfinals ===
14 June 2015	Germany	3 – 0	Russia

Han Ying	3–1	Yana Noskova	11–4, 6–11, 11–7, 11–1
Petrissa Solja	3–1	Polina Mikhailova	11–3, 11–7, 9–11, 11–7
Shan Xiaona / Petrissa Solja	3–0	Anna Tikhomirova / Yana Noskova	11–6, 11–7, 11–7

14 June 2015	France	1 – 3	Czech Republic

Xian Yifang	3–2	Renáta Štrbíková	9–11, 11–9, 6–11, 11–7, 5–11
Li Xue	3–1	Iveta Vacenovská	9–11, 11–6, 11–8, 11–8
Carole Grundisch / Li Xue	1–3	Hana Matelová / Renáta Štrbíková	6–11, 8–11, 11–3, 6–11
Carole Grundisch	0–3	Iveta Vacenovská	6–11, 12–14, 7–11

14 June 2015	Ukraine	3 – 0	Sweden

Margaryta Pesotska	3–0	Matilda Ekholm	11–7, 11–9, 12–10
Tetyana Bilenko	3–0	Linda Bergström	11–1, 11–5, 11–4
Ganna Gaponova / Tetyana Bilenko	3–0	Daniela Moskovits / Linda Bergström	11–6, 11–7, 11–7

15 June 2015	Poland	2 – 3	Netherlands

Katarzyna Grzybowska	1–3	Li Jiao	11–13, 7–11, 11–7, 3–11
Li Qian	3–0	Li Jie	11–5, 11–7, 11–8
Natalia Partyka / Katarzyna Grzybowska	0–3	Britt Eerland / Li Jiao	9–11, 8–11, 10–12
Li Qian	3–1	Britt Eerland	7–11, 11–4, 11–3, 11–4
Natalia Partyka	1–3	Li Jie	6–11, 6–11, 11–4, 8–11

=== Semifinals ===
15 June 2015	Germany	3 – 0	Czech Republic

Han Ying	3–1	Iveta Vacenovská	7–11, 11–7, 11–3, 11–3
Petrissa Solja	3–0	Renáta Štrbíková	11–6, 12–10, 11–7
Shan Xiaona / Petrissa Solja	3–0	Hana Matelová / Iveta Vacenovská	14–12, 11–9, 11–8

15 June 2015	Ukraine	2 – 3	Netherlands

Margaryta Pesotska	2–3	Li Jiao	11–9, 10–12, 8–11, 11–7, 9–11
Tetyana Bilenko	0–3	Li Jie	7–11, 9–11, 9–11
Ganna Gaponova / Tetyana Bilenko	3–2	Britt Eerland / Li Jiao	9–11, 11–7, 11–5, 9–11, 11–9
Margaryta Pesotska	3–2	Britt Eerland	11–7, 10–12, 11–7, 12–14, 11–8
Ganna Gaponova	0–3	Li Jie	7–11, 1–11, 3–11

=== Bronze Medal ===
15 June 2015	Czech Republic	3 – 1	Ukraine

Iveta Vacenovská	3–1	Tetyana Bilenko	11–7, 9–11, 11–6, 11–3
Renáta Štrbíková	1–3	Margaryta Pesotska	8–11, 11–5, 5–11, 6–11
Hana Matelová / Renáta Štrbíková	3–2	Ganna Gaponova / Tetyana Bilenko	7–11, 11–9, 9–11, 11–6, 11–8
Iveta Vacenovská	3–0	Ganna Gaponova	11–7, 11–8, 11–9

=== Gold Medal ===
15 June 2015	Germany	3 – 2	Netherlands

Han Ying	0–3	Li Jiao	9–11, 10–12, 5–11
Shan Xiaona	3–1	Li Jie	11–4, 8–11, 11–8, 11–5
Petrissa Solja / Shan Xiaona	3–2	Britt Eerland / Li Jiao	8–11, 11–7, 11–9, 7–11, 11–7
Petrissa Solja	0–3	Li Jie	8–11, 7–11, 9–11
Han Ying	3–0	Britt Eerland	11–1, 11–2, 11–6
