= Table tennis at the 2012 Summer Olympics – Women's team =

Table tennis – women's team at the Games of the XXX Olympiad
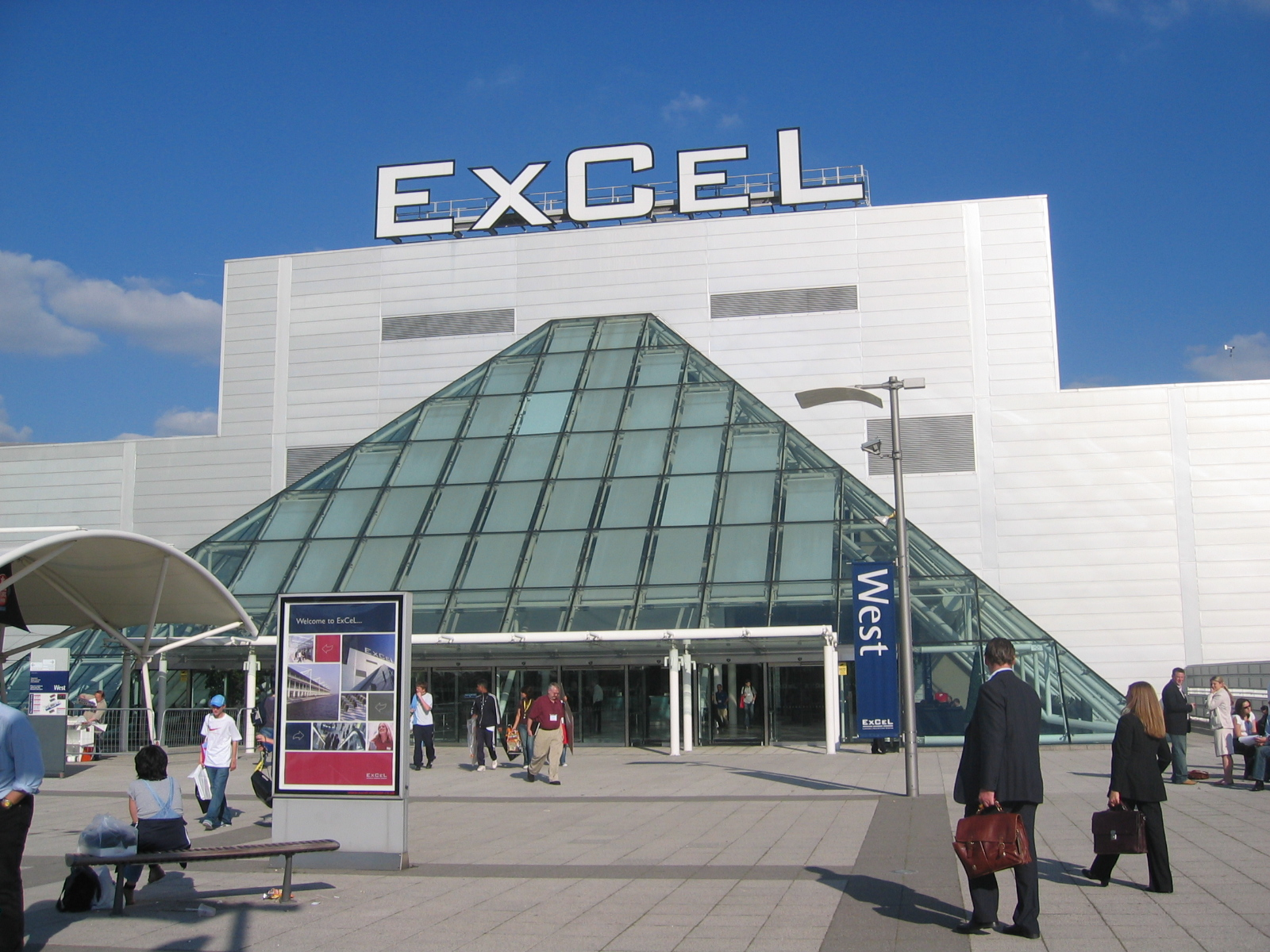
- ExCel Exhibition Centre
- Venue: ExCeL London
- Date: 3 August to 7 August 2012
- Competitors: 49 from 16 nations
- Teams: 16

Medalists
1st place, gold medalist(s)		Ding Ning; Li Xiaoxia; Guo Yue	China
2nd place, silver medalist(s)		Ai Fukuhara; Sayaka Hirano; Kasumi Ishikawa	Japan
3rd place, bronze medalist(s)		Li Jiawei; Feng Tianwei; Wang Yuegu	Singapore

The women's team table tennis event was part of the table tennis programme at the 2012 Summer Olympics in London. The event took place from Friday 3 August to Tuesday 7 August 2012 at ExCeL London. The tournament was a single elimination tournament with a third place playoff played between the two losing semi-finalists.

== Schedule ==
All times are British Summer Time (UTC+1).

Dates	Start time	Round
3 August	10:00	First round
4 August	14:30	Quarterfinals
5 August	19:00	Semifinals
6 August	10:00	Semifinals
7 August	11:00	Bronze medal match
7 August	15:30	Gold medal match

== Seeds ==
Team ranking was based on the individual Ranking List of July 2012 but was taken into consideration only the players qualified from each team.

Rank	Team	Athletes (world ranking on 4 July)		
1	China	Ding Ning (1)	Li Xiaoxia (3)	Guo Yue (8)
2	Japan	Kasumi Ishikawa (6)	Ai Fukuhara (7)	Sayaka Hirano (18)
3	Singapore	Feng Tianwei (8)	Wang Yuegu (11)	Li Jiawei (15)
4	South Korea	Kim Kyung-Ah (5)	Seok Ha-Jung (19)	Park Mi-Young (33); Dang Ye-Seo (23) (Dang replaced Park before quarterfinals)
5	Hong Kong	Tie Ya Na (10)	Jiang Huajun (20)	Lee Ho Ching (85)
6	Germany	Wu Jiaduo (16)	Irene Ivancan (37)	Kristin Silbereisen (47)
7	Netherlands	Li Jiao (20)	Li Jie (28)	Elena Timina (135)
8	North Korea	Ri Myong-Sun (34)	Kim Jong (53)	Ri Mi-Gyong (63)
9	Austria	Liu Jia (45)	Li Qiangbing (64)	Amelie Solja (90)
10	Spain	Shen Yanfei (17)	Sara Ramírez (83)	Galia Dvorak (114)
11	Poland	Li Qian (30)	Natalia Partyka (68)	Katarzyna Grzybowska (117)
12	United States	Ariel Hsing (115)	Lily Zhang (139)	Erica Wu (448)
13	Great Britain	Joanna Parker (119)	Na Liu (153)	Kelly Sibley (177)
14	Australia	Lay Jian Fang (130)	Miao Miao (199)	Vivian Tan (243)
15	Brazil	Caroline Kumahara (192)	Lígia Silva (228)	Gui Lin (255)
16	Egypt	Dina Meshref (160)	Nadeen El-Dawlatly (279)	Raghd Magdy (430)

== Bracket ==
The draw for team events took place on 25 July 2012.

First round
1	China	3
10	Spain	0
16	Egypt	0
7	Netherlands	3
5	Hong Kong	3
9	Austria	1
15	Brazil	0
4	South Korea	3
3	Singapore	3
11	Poland	1
13	Great Britain	0
8	North Korea	3
6	Germany	3
14	Australia	0
12	United States	0
2	Japan	3

Quarterfinals
1	China	3
7	Netherlands	0
5	Hong Kong	0
4	South Korea	3
3	Singapore	3
8	North Korea	0
6	Germany	0
2	Japan	3

Semifinals
1	China	3
4	South Korea	0
3	Singapore	0
2	Japan	3

Gold medal match
1	China	3
2	Japan	0
Bronze medal match
4	South Korea	0
3	Singapore	3

== Results ==
=== First round ===
3 August 2012; 10:00	China	3–0	Spain	Duration: 1h 30min

	Individual matches
Li Xiaoxia	3–0	Shen Yanfei	11–4, 11–7, 14–12
Guo Yue	3–1	Sara Ramírez	11–9, 8–11, 11–5, 11–8
Ding Ning / Li Xiaoxia	3–0	Galia Dvorak / Sara Ramírez	11–7, 11–5, 11–8

3 August 2012; 10:00	Brazil	0–3	South Korea	Duration: 1h 2min

	Individual matches
Caroline Kumahara	0–3	Kim Kyung-Ah	2–11, 3–11, 6–11
Gui Lin	0–3	Seok Ha-Jung	8–11, 5–11, 8–11
Lígia Silva / Gui Lin	0–3	Park Mi-Young / Kim Kyung-Ah	5–11, 5–11, 6–11

3 August 2012; 10:00	Singapore	3–1	Poland	Duration: 2h 16min

	Individual matches
Feng Tianwei	2–3	Li Qian	8–11, 15–13, 11–9, 9–11, 8–11
Wang Yuegu	3–0	Natalia Partyka	11–6, 11–9, 11–6
Li Jiawei / Wang Yuegu	3–0	Katarzyna Grzybowska / Natalia Partyka	11–7, 11–6, 11–9
Feng Tianwei	3–0	Katarzyna Grzybowska	11–8, 11–6, 11–6

3 August 2012; 10:00	United States	0–3	Japan	Duration: 1h 5min

	Individual matches
Ariel Hsing	0–3	Ai Fukuhara	4–11, 7–11, 7–11
Lily Zhang	0–3	Sayaka Hirano	9–11, 5–11, 3–11
Lily Zhang / Erica Wu	0–3	Kasumi Ishikawa / Ai Fukuhara	7–11, 7–11, 3–11

3 August 2012; 14:30	Egypt	0–3	Netherlands	Duration: 58min

	Individual matches
Nadeen El-Dawlatly	0–3	Li Jiao	6–11, 4–11, 4–11
Dina Meshref	0–3	Li Jie	5–11, 5–11, 2–11
Raghad Magdy / Dina Meshref	0–3	Elena Timina / Li Jie	4–11, 7–11, 2–11

3 August 2012; 14:30	Hong Kong	3–1	Austria	Duration: 2h 6min

	Individual matches
Tie Ya Na	3–2	Liu Jia	7–11, 11–7, 4–11, 11–6, 15–13
Jiang Huajun	0–3	Amelie Solja	4–11, 8–11, 11–13
Lee Ho Ching / Tie Ya Na	3–0	Li Qiangbing / Amelie Solja	11–9, 14–12, 11–2
Jiang Huajun	3–0	Li Qiangbing	11–6, 11–8, 11–6

3 August 2012; 14:30	Great Britain	0–3	North Korea	Duration: 1h 44min

	Individual matches
Joanna Parker	1–3	Ri Myong-Sun	8–11, 11–8, 8–11, 4–11
Na Liu	0–3	Kim Jong	8–11, 9–11, 7–11
Kelly Sibley / Joanna Parker	0–3	Ri Mi-Gyong / Kim Jong	2–11, 7–11, 3–11

3 August 2012; 14:30	Germany	3–0	Australia	Duration: 1h 34min

	Individual matches
Irene Ivancan	3–1	Miao Miao	7–11, 15–13, 11–5, 11–8
Wu Jiaduo	3–0	Lay Jian Fang	11–7, 11–7, 11–7
Kristin Silbereisen / Wu Jiaduo	3–1	Vivian Tan / Miao Miao	11–6, 9–11, 12–10, 12–10

=== Quarterfinals ===
4 August 2012; 14:30	China	3–0	Netherlands	Duration: 1h 42min

	Individual matches
Guo Yue	3–0	Li Jiao	11–9, 11–7, 14–12
Ding Ning	3–1	Li Jie	11–8, 11–8, 9–11, 11–7
Li Xiaoxia / Guo Yue	3–0	Elena Timina / Li Jie	11–4, 11–8, 11–9

4 August 2012; 14:30	Germany	0–3	Japan	Duration: 1h 50min

	Individual matches
Wu Jiaduo	2–3	Kasumi Ishikawa	8–11, 11–8, 7–11, 11–6, 11–13
Irene Ivancan	1–3	Ai Fukuhara	11–8, 8–11, 8–11, 7–11
Kristin Silbereisen / Wu Jiaduo	0–3	Sayaka Hirano / Ai Fukuhara	8–11, 5–11, 7–11

4 August 2012; 19:00	Hong Kong	0–3	South Korea	Duration: 2h 22min

	Individual matches
Tie Ya Na	0–3	Dang Ye-Seo	12–14, 9–11, 4–11
Jiang Huajun	2–3	Kim Kyung-Ah	4–11, 11–4, 3–11, 12–10, 10–12
Lee Ho Ching / Tie Ya Na	2–3	Seok Ha-Jung / Dang Ye-Seo	9–11, 6–11, 14–12, 11–9, 9–11

4 August 2012; 19:00	Singapore	3–0	North Korea	Duration: 1h 43min

	Individual matches
Wang Yuegu	3–1	Ri Myong-Sun	11–7, 11–9, 5–11, 11–5
Feng Tianwei	3–1	Kim Jong	9–11, 11–4, 11–9, 11–4
Li Jiawei / Wang Yuegu	3–1	Ri Mi-Gyong / Kim Jong	4–11, 11–7, 11–9, 11–8

=== Semifinals ===
5 August 2012; 19:00	Singapore	0–3	Japan	Duration: 1h 22min

	Individual matches
Feng Tianwei	1–3	Ai Fukuhara	9–11, 6–11, 11–5, 9–11
Wang Yuegu	0–3	Kasumi Ishikawa	5–11, 6–11, 2–11
Li Jiawei / Wang Yuegu	0–3	Sayaka Hirano / Kasumi Ishikawa	3–11, 11–13, 4–11

6 August 2012; 10:00	China	3–0	South Korea	Duration: 1h 31min

	Individual matches
Li Xiaoxia	3–0	Seok Ha-Jung	11–6, 11–6, 12 −10
Ding Ning	3–0	Kim Kyung-Ah	11–8, 11–7, 11–7
Guo Yue / Li Xiaoxia	3–0	Dang Ye-Seo / Seok Ha-Jung	11–6, 11–5, 11–8

=== Bronze medal match ===
7 August 2012; 11:00	South Korea	0–3	Singapore	Duration: 1h 59min

	Individual matches
Kim Kyung-Ah	1–3	Feng Tianwei	9–11, 8–11, 11–4, 11–13
Seok Ha-Jung	1–3	Li Jiawei	5–11, 8–11, 11–6, 8–11
Dang Ye-Seo / Seok Ha-Jung	1–3	Wang Yuegu / Li Jiawei	9–11, 6–11, 11–6, 5–11

=== Gold medal match ===
7 August 2012; 15:30	China	3–0	Japan	Duration: 1h 32min

	Individual matches
Li Xiaoxia	3–1	Ai Fukuhara	11–6, 9–11, 11–2, 11–5
Ding Ning	3–0	Kasumi Ishikawa	11–4, 12–10, 11–4
Guo Yue / Li Xiaoxia	3–1	Sayaka Hirano / Kasumi Ishikawa	11–6, 11–3, 9–11, 11–5
