= Table tennis at the 2007 Summer Universiade =

The Table tennis competition in the 2007 Summer Universiade were held in Bangkok, Thailand.

== Medal overview ==
Event	Gold	Silver	Bronze
Men's Singles	Gao Xin (CHN)	Hou Yingxao (CHN)	Chuang Chih-yuan (TPE)
Men's Singles	Gao Xin (CHN)	Hou Yingxao (CHN)	Wang Xi (CHN)
Men's Doubles	Chinese Taipei (TPE); Chuang Chih-yuan; Chang Yen-shu	Chinese Taipei (TPE); Chiang Hung-chieh; Wu Chih-chi	China (CHN); Hou Yingchao; Wang Xi
Men's Doubles	Chinese Taipei (TPE); Chuang Chih-yuan; Chang Yen-shu	Chinese Taipei (TPE); Chiang Hung-chieh; Wu Chih-chi	Japan (JPN); Ryusuke Sakamoto; Hidetoshi Oya
Men's Team	China (CHN); Hou Yingchao; Zhan Jian; Gao Xin; Lin Chen; Wang Xi	Chinese Taipei (TPE); Chiang Hung-chieh; Wu Chih-chi; Lai Kuan-shen; Chang Yen-shu; Chuan Chih-yuan	Germany (GER); Steffen Christ; Lennart Boris Wehking; Nico Stehle
Men's Team	China (CHN); Hou Yingchao; Zhan Jian; Gao Xin; Lin Chen; Wang Xi	Chinese Taipei (TPE); Chiang Hung-chieh; Wu Chih-chi; Lai Kuan-shen; Chang Yen-shu; Chuan Chih-yuan	Japan (JPN); Takanori Shimoyama; Hidetoshi Oya; Michikazu Tsuboguchi; Yuichi Tokiyoshi; Ryusuke Sakamoto
Women's Singles	Rao Jingwen (CHN)	Liu Juan (CHN)	Haruna Fukuoka (JPN)
Women's Singles	Rao Jingwen (CHN)	Liu Juan (CHN)	Nanthana Komwong (THA)
Women's Doubles	China (CHN) Liu Juan; Rao Jingwen	Japan (JPN) Haruna Fukuoka; Yuko Watanabe	Germany (GER); Nadine Bollmeier; Irene Ivancan
Women's Doubles	China (CHN) Liu Juan; Rao Jingwen	Japan (JPN) Haruna Fukuoka; Yuko Watanabe	Chinese Taipei (TPE); Huang Yi-hua; Lu Yun-feng
Women's Team	China (CHN); Yu Jingwei; Rao Jingwen; Cai Shanshan; Dai Ningyang; Liu Juan	Japan (JPN); Midori Itō; Chiharu Yamazaki; Moemi Terui; Haruna Fukuoka; Yuko Watanabe	France (FRA); Laurie Phai-pang; Carole Grundisch; Dienouma Coulibaly; Sarah Hanffou
Women's Team	China (CHN); Yu Jingwei; Rao Jingwen; Cai Shanshan; Dai Ningyang; Liu Juan	Japan (JPN); Midori Itō; Chiharu Yamazaki; Moemi Terui; Haruna Fukuoka; Yuko Watanabe	South Korea (KOR); Youn Han-mi; Kim Hyo-nam; Choi Sun-hwa; Kim Nam-hue; Lee Mi-lim
Mixed Doubles	China (CHN); Rao Jingwen; Lin Chen	China (CHN); Liu Juan; Zhan Jian	China (CHN); Cai Shanshan; Gao Xin
Mixed Doubles	China (CHN); Rao Jingwen; Lin Chen	China (CHN); Liu Juan; Zhan Jian	Chinese Taipei (TPE); Chen Chi-tan; Chiang Peng-lung

== Medal table ==
Rank	Nation	Gold	Silver	Bronze	Total
1	China (CHN)	6	3	3	12
2	Chinese Taipei (TPE)	1	2	3	6
3	Japan (JPN)	0	2	3	5
4	Germany (GER)	0	0	2	2
5	France (FRA)	0	0	1	1
5	South Korea (KOR)	0	0	1	1
5	Thailand (THA)	0	0	1	1
Totals (7 entries)		7	7	14	28
