= 2015 World Table Tennis Championships =

- Date: 26 April – 3 May
- Edition: 53rd
- Location: Suzhou, China
- Venue: Suzhou International Expo Center

Champions

Men's singles
- (China) Ma Long

Women's singles
- (China) Ding Ning

Men's doubles
- (China) Xu Xin / (China) Zhang Jike

Women's doubles
- (China) Liu Shiwen / (China) Zhu Yuling

Mixed doubles
- (China) Xu Xin / (South Korea) Yang Ha-eun
← 2013 ·	World Table Tennis Championships	· 2017 →

The 2015 World Table Tennis Championships were held in Suzhou from 26 April to 3 May 2015. The Championship was staged in China for the fifth time and was the 53rd edition of the individual competition. The decision was announced by ITTF in March 2012. Suzhou became the first Chinese host city at prefecture level which had accumulated sufficient experience by hosting three China Open tournaments from 2009 through 2011.

== Schedule ==
Five individual events were contested. Qualification rounds were held from 26–27 April.

Rounds in main draw
Finals

Date	27 April	28 April	29 April	30 April	1 May	2 May	3 May
Men's singles		1R	2R	3R	4R	QF	SF, F
Women's singles		1R	2R	3R	4R, QF	SF, F	
Men's doubles		1R, 2R	3R	QF		SF, F	
Women's doubles		1R, 2R	3R	QF			SF, F
Mixed doubles	1R, 2R	3R	4R, QF	SF	F		

== Medal summary ==
=== Medal table ===
Rank	Nation	Gold	Silver	Bronze	Total
1	China (CHN)	4.5	4	4	12.5
2	South Korea (KOR)	0.5	0	1	1.5
3	Japan (JPN)	0	1	1	2
4	Hong Kong (HKG)	0	0	1	1
4	North Korea (PRK)	0	0	1	1
4	Singapore (SIN)	0	0	1	1
7	Netherlands (NED)	0	0	0.5	0.5
7	Poland (POL)	0	0	0.5	0.5
Totals (8 entries)		5	5	10	20

=== Events ===
Event	Gold	Silver	Bronze
Men's singles	(China) Ma Long	(China) Fang Bo	(China) Fan Zhendong
Men's singles	(China) Ma Long	(China) Fang Bo	(China) Zhang Jike
Women's singles	(China) Ding Ning	(China) Liu Shiwen	(China) Mu Zi
Women's singles	(China) Ding Ning	(China) Liu Shiwen	(China) Li Xiaoxia
Men's doubles	(China) Xu Xin (China) Zhang Jike	(China) Fan Zhendong (China) Zhou Yu	(South Korea) Lee Sang-su (South Korea) Seo Hyun-deok
Men's doubles	(China) Xu Xin (China) Zhang Jike	(China) Fan Zhendong (China) Zhou Yu	(Japan) Kenta Matsudaira (Japan) Koki Niwa
Women's doubles	(China) Liu Shiwen (China) Zhu Yuling	(China) Ding Ning (China) Li Xiaoxia	(Singapore) Feng Tianwei (Singapore) Yu Mengyu
Women's doubles	(China) Liu Shiwen (China) Zhu Yuling	(China) Ding Ning (China) Li Xiaoxia	(Netherlands) Li Jie (Poland) Li Qian
Mixed doubles	(China) Xu Xin (South Korea) Yang Ha-eun	(Japan) Maharu Yoshimura (Japan) Kasumi Ishikawa	(North Korea) Kim Hyok-bong (North Korea) Kim Jong
Mixed doubles	(China) Xu Xin (South Korea) Yang Ha-eun	(Japan) Maharu Yoshimura (Japan) Kasumi Ishikawa	(Hong Kong) Wong Chun Ting (Hong Kong) Doo Hoi Kem
