= 2013 World Table Tennis Championships =

- Date: May 13–20
- Edition: 52nd
- Location: Paris, France
- Venue: Palais Omnisports de Paris-Bercy

Champions

Men's singles
- (China) Zhang Jike

Women's singles
- (China) Li Xiaoxia

Men's doubles
- (Chinese Taipei) Chen Chien-an / (Chinese Taipei) Chuang Chih-yuan

Women's doubles
- (China) Guo Yue / (China) Li Xiaoxia

Mixed doubles
- (North Korea) Kim Hyok-Bong / (North Korea) Kim Jong
- World Table Tennis Championships

The 2013 World Table Tennis Championships were held at the Palais Omnisports de Paris-Bercy in Paris, France, from May 13 to May 20, 2013. The Championships were the 52nd edition of the World Table Tennis Championships.

These were the first Championships since 2003 in which China did not win all five competitions and the first since 1993 in which they won fewer than four gold medals. China's ten-Championships long streak of men's doubles titles came to an end as Chuang Chih-yuan and Chen Chien-an of Chinese Taipei (Taiwan) beat a Chinese duo for their nation's first-ever gold medal. China's eleven-Championships long streak of mixed doubles titles (since 1989) came to an end as Kim Hyok-Bong and Kim Jong of North Korea beat a South Korean team in the finals. However, China did have the top four finishers in both the men's and women's singles and won 14 of 20 medals overall.

Zhang Jike took the men's title, marking his fourth consecutive World or Olympic first-place finish, while Li Xiaoxia won her first World title in the women's singles. Li also teamed up with Guo Yue to win the women's doubles title for China.

== Host ==
Doha, one of the only two candidate cities, withdrew its bid after the Qatar Table Tennis Association was made aware that Paris wanted to mark the 10-year anniversary of the 2003 World Table Tennis Championships. As a result, Paris was selected as the host city. The decision was announced by ITTF in May 2010. The tournament was held at the 12,000 seat Palais Omnisports de Paris-Bercy.

== Schedule ==
Five different events were contested at the Championships. Qualification rounds were held from May 13 to 14.

Rounds in main draw
Finals

Date	May 14	May 15	May 16	May 17	May 18	May 19	May 20
Men's singles		1R	2R	3R	4R	QF, SF	F
Women's singles		1R, 2R	3R	4R	QF, SF	F	
Men's doubles		1R	1R, 2R	3R, QF	SF	F	
Women's doubles		1R	2R	3R, QF		SF	F
Mixed doubles	1R	2R	3R, 4R	QF	SF, F		

== Results ==
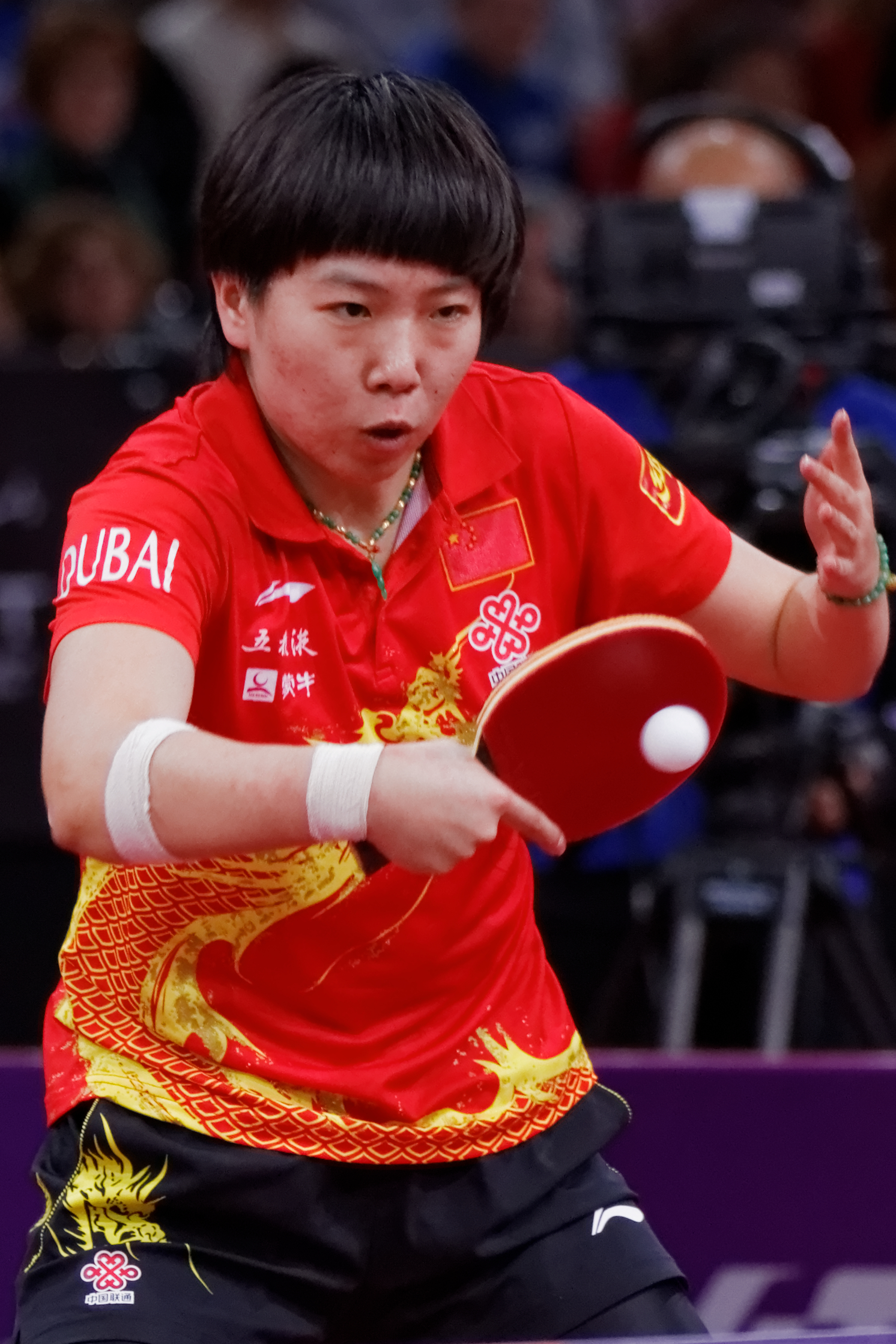
Women's singles winner Li Xiaoxia playing at the event

Entering the 2013 World Table Tennis Championship, China had not lost a single event since 2003 when Werner Schlager of Austria won the men's singles.

Both men's semi-finals featured a matchup of two highly ranked Chinese players. In the first, the fourth-seed Zhang Jike dominated the world number-one Xu Xin in a victory of four sets to none (11–8, 11–2, 11–9, 12–10). In the other semi-final, the third-seed Wang Hao triumphed four sets to two (11–9, 11–7, 11–3, 7–11, 12–14, 11–3) over the second-ranked Ma Long.

In the men's singles final, Zhang Jike beat his countryman Wang Hao 4–2 to claim his fourth straight major title. Zhang won the first set 11–7 and the second 11–8. Wang bounced back to take the third set 11–6. He continued his surge in the fourth set, taking an early lead and going up 10–7. However, Zhang maintained his composure, saving 4 setpoints, and took the hard-fought set 14–12. Wang took the fifth set 11–5 to stay alive in the best of seven match, before Zhang finished the match with an 11–7 fifth set, winning six points in a row at the end. The victorious Zhang threw his shirt into the crowd and run into the stands to celebrate with his parents who had never attended a world competition event before. "My parents had always wanted to watch me play during major world competitions, but I refused. This time I asked them to come here", he explained.

Zhang had previously won the 2011 World Cup and 2012 Olympic Games, both also over Wang, as well as the 2011 World Championships. He has never lost to Wang in international competition. After the match, Wang announced it was his last World Championships, as he plans to retire in the near future.

In men's doubles, Chuang Chih-yuan and Chen Chien-an captured Chinese Taipei's (Taiwan) first gold medal. The duo topped Ma Lin and Hao Shuai of China four sets to two. Ma and Hao won the first set 11–9, before dropping three in a row to Chuang and Chen (12–10, 11–6, 13–11). After Ma and Hao won the fifth set 11–9, Chuang and Chen finished off the match with an 11–8 sixth set. The secretary general of the Chinese Taipei Table Tennis Association called the victory "an important milestone in our table tennis history," and the Taipei government awarded Chaung and Chen NT$900,000 (US$30,033) each for their accomplishment. Taiwanese president Ma Ying-jeou remarked "It’s a hard-won achievement that highlights the Taiwan spirit of perseverance and fortitude." Chinese Taipei had been competing in world championships since 1985. The country's previous best finish was second place in women's single by Chen Jing twenty years prior. China had won the men's doubles in the last ten World Championships.

In women's singles, Li Xiaoxia of China claimed her first World Championships with a four set to two victory over compatriot Liu Shiwen. Li won the first set 11–8, but Liu bounced back with an easy 11–4 second set victory. Li captured the third set 11–7 and fourth 12–10. Liu stayed alive with an 11–6 fifth set and fended off two match point in the sixth before falling 13–11. Li had previously finished second at the World Championships in 2011 and 2007. Her victory allowed her to complete a career glad slam (World Cup, Olympic title, and World Championships). For Liu, it was her first World Championship Final appearance. Ding Ning and rising star Zhu Yuling, both also from China, took the bronze medals.

The day after Li won the single's title, she joined with Guo Yue to add the women's double gold to her medal haul. Ding Ning and Liu Shiwen, also from China, took the first set 11–5, but it was all Li and Guo from there. Li and Guo, who are close friends, won the second set 11–5, and then the next three sets 11–7, 11–5, and 11–7, for a four set to one victory. Singapore's Feng Tianwei and Yu Mengyu took one of bronzes, with the other going to Chen Meng and Zhu Yuling if China.

Entering the World Championships, China had won eleven straight mixed doubles titles (since 1989). However, no Chinese team made the finals in 2013. Instead, Kim Hyok-Bong and Kim Jong of North Korea beat Lee Sang-Su and Park Young-Sook of South Korea 4–2. The North Korean team won the first three sets, before dropping two straight. They recovered from their slide and won the match in the sixth set. It was the first-ever mixed doubles title for the nation and the first world title of any kind in 36 years.

=== Finals ===
Category	Winners	Runners-up	Score
Men's singles	(China) Zhang Jike	(China) Wang Hao	11–7, 11–8, 6–11, 14–12, 5–11, 11–7
Women's singles	(China) Li Xiaoxia	(China) Liu Shiwen	11–8, 4–11, 11–7, 12–10, 6–11, 13–11
Men's doubles	(Chinese Taipei) Chen Chien-an / Chuang Chih-yuan	(China) Hao Shuai / Ma Lin	9–11, 12–10, 11–6, 13–11, 9–11, 11–8
Women's doubles	(China) Guo Yue / Li Xiaoxia	(China) Ding Ning / Liu Shiwen	5–11, 11–5, 11–7, 11–5, 11–7
Mixed doubles	(North Korea) Kim Hyok-Bong / Kim Jong	(South Korea) Lee Sang-Su / Park Young-Sook	11–6, 11–8, 11–3, 6–11, 8–11, 11–7

== Medal summary ==
=== Medal table ===
Rank	Nation	Gold	Silver	Bronze	Total
1	China	3	4	7	14
2	Chinese Taipei	1	0	0	1
2	North Korea	1	0	0	1
4	South Korea	0	1	0	1
5	Hong Kong	0	0	1	1
5	Japan	0	0	1	1
5	Singapore	0	0	1	1
Totals (7 entries)		5	5	10	20

=== Events ===
Event	Gold	Silver	Bronze
Men's singles	Zhang Jike; China	Wang Hao; China	Xu Xin; China
Men's singles	Zhang Jike; China	Wang Hao; China	Ma Long; China
Women's singles	Li Xiaoxia; China	Liu Shiwen; China	Ding Ning; China
Women's singles	Li Xiaoxia; China	Liu Shiwen; China	Zhu Yuling; China
Men's doubles	Chen Chien-an and Chuang Chih-yuan; Chinese Taipei	Hao Shuai and Ma Lin; China	Seiya Kishikawa and Jun Mizutani; Japan
Men's doubles	Chen Chien-an and Chuang Chih-yuan; Chinese Taipei	Hao Shuai and Ma Lin; China	Wang Liqin and Zhou Yu; China
Women's doubles	Guo Yue and Li Xiaoxia; China	Ding Ning and Liu Shiwen; China	Feng Tianwei and Yu Mengyu; Singapore
Women's doubles	Guo Yue and Li Xiaoxia; China	Ding Ning and Liu Shiwen; China	Chen Meng and Zhu Yuling; China
Mixed doubles	Kim Hyok-Bong and Kim Jong; North Korea	Lee Sang-Su and Park Young-Sook; South Korea	Wang Liqin and Rao Jingwen; China
Mixed doubles	Kim Hyok-Bong and Kim Jong; North Korea	Lee Sang-Su and Park Young-Sook; South Korea	Cheung Yuk and Jiang Huajun; Hong Kong
