= Yingchao =

Yingchao is a surname, Notable people with this surname include:

- Deng Yingchao (1904–1992), chairwoman of the Chinese People's Political Consultative Conference
- Fang Yingchao (born 1982), Chinese volleyball player
- Hou Yingchao (born 1980), Chinese table tennis player
- Kong Yingchao (born 1982), Chinese biathlete
