= Table tennis at the 2014 Asian Games – Mixed doubles =

Mixed doubles at the 2014 Asian Games
- Venue: Suwon Gymnasium
- Dates: 29 September – 3 October 2014
- Competitors: 68 from 19 nations

Medalists
gold medal	Kim Hyok-bong; Kim Jong	North Korea
silver medal	Jiang Tianyi; Lee Ho Ching	Hong Kong
bronze medal	Seiya Kishikawa; Ai Fukuhara	Japan
bronze medal	Kim Min-seok; Jeon Ji-hee	South Korea

The mixed doubles table tennis event was part of the table tennis programme and took place between September 29 and October 3, at the Suwon Gymnasium.

== Schedule ==
All times are Korea Standard Time (UTC+09:00)

Date	Time	Event
Monday, 29 September 2014	10:00	1st round
Monday, 29 September 2014	10:00	2nd round
Tuesday, 30 September 2014	10:00	3rd round
Wednesday, 1 October 2014	14:00	Quarterfinals
Thursday, 2 October 2014	18:00	Semifinals
Friday, 3 October 2014	14:00	Final

== Results ==
Legend

- WO — Won by walkover

=== Finals ===
Quarterfinals
1	Fan Zhendong (CHN); Chen Meng (CHN)	9	9	8
6	Jiang Tianyi (HKG); Lee Ho Ching (HKG)	11	11	11
7	Kim Min-seok (KOR); Jeon Ji-hee (KOR)	11	12	8	10	11
4	Koki Niwa (JPN); Sayaka Hirano (JPN)	4	10	11	12	6
10	Cheung Yuk (HKG); Jiang Huajun (HKG)	8	11	11	9	3
5	Seiya Kishikawa (JPN); Ai Fukuhara (JPN)	11	8	5	11	11
13	Kim Hyok-bong (PRK); Kim Jong (PRK)	8	11	8	11	11
2	Zhou Yu (CHN); Wu Yang (CHN)	11	6	11	7	5

Semifinals
6	Jiang Tianyi (HKG); Lee Ho Ching (HKG)	11	7	13	8	9	11	11
7	Kim Min-seok (KOR); Jeon Ji-hee (KOR)	8	11	11	11	11	8	3
5	Seiya Kishikawa (JPN); Ai Fukuhara (JPN)	11	4	9	7	9
13	Kim Hyok-bong (PRK); Kim Jong (PRK)	3	11	11	11	11

Final
6	Jiang Tianyi (HKG); Lee Ho Ching (HKG)	10	10	12	6	6
13	Kim Hyok-bong (PRK); Kim Jong (PRK)	12	12	10	11	11

=== Top half ===
==== Section 1 ====
1st round	2nd round					3rd round
	1	Fan Zhendong (CHN); Chen Meng (CHN)	11	11	11
	32	Mohamed Zeesth Naseem (MDV); Aminath Shiura Shareef (MDV)	2	2	3
						1	Fan Zhendong (CHN); Chen Meng (CHN)	11	8	11	7	11
						9	Chen Chien-an (TPE); Huang Yi-hua (TPE)	5	11	7	11	8
	23	German Shemet (QAT); Aya Majdi (QAT)
	9	Chen Chien-an (TPE); Huang Yi-hua (TPE)	W	O

==== Section 2 ====
1st round	2nd round					3rd round
	11	Li Hu (SIN); Zhou Yihan (SIN)	11	11	11
	18	Chang Hoi Wa (MAC); Ma Chao In (MAC)	3	5	5
						11	Li Hu (SIN); Zhou Yihan (SIN)	11	9	6	11	9
						6	Jiang Tianyi (HKG); Lee Ho Ching (HKG)	6	11	11	6	11
	25	Phinith Kongphet (LAO); Thiphakone Southamavong (LAO)	6	4	5
	6	Jiang Tianyi (HKG); Lee Ho Ching (HKG)	11	11	11

==== Section 3 ====
1st round					2nd round					3rd round
					7	Kim Min-seok (KOR); Jeon Ji-hee (KOR)	11	13	11
					24	Rashed Khaled Sanad (BRN); Maryam Al-Qasimi (BRN)	4	11	3
										7	Kim Min-seok (KOR); Jeon Ji-hee (KOR)	7	11	11	11
17	Padasak Tanviriyavechakul (THA); Suthasini Sawettabut (THA)	11	11	11						17	Padasak Tanviriyavechakul (THA); Suthasini Sawettabut (THA)	11	7	9	6
	Saleem Abbas Kazmi (PAK); Aisha Iqbal Ansari (PAK)	9	6	3	17	Padasak Tanviriyavechakul (THA); Suthasini Sawettabut (THA)	11	11	16
					15	Sharath Kamal (IND); Poulomi Ghatak (IND)	6	9	14

==== Section 4 ====
1st round	2nd round					3rd round
	14	Kim Nam-chol (PRK); Kim Hye-song (PRK)	11	11	11
	30	Purshottam Bajracharya (NEP); Kajol Rauniyar (NEP)	5	5	2
						14	Kim Nam-chol (PRK); Kim Hye-song (PRK)	11	11	6	7	7
						4	Koki Niwa (JPN); Sayaka Hirano (JPN)	6	9	11	11	11
	28	Batkhishigiin Bilegt (MGL); Batsaikhany Batkhishig (MGL)	7	10	2
	4	Koki Niwa (JPN); Sayaka Hirano (JPN)	11	12	11

=== Bottom half ===
==== Section 5 ====
1st round	2nd round					3rd round
	3	Chuang Chih-yuan (TPE); Cheng I-ching (TPE)	11	11	11
	20	Muhammad Asim Qureshi (PAK); Rahila Kashif (PAK)	7	6	4
						3	Chuang Chih-yuan (TPE); Cheng I-ching (TPE)	7	7	11
						10	Cheung Yuk (HKG); Jiang Huajun (HKG)	11	11	13
	31	Moosa Munsif Ahmed (MDV); Mueena Mohamed (MDV)	7	3	2
	10	Cheung Yuk (HKG); Jiang Huajun (HKG)	11	11	11

==== Section 6 ====
1st round				2nd round					3rd round
				16	Anthony Amalraj (IND); Madhurika Patkar (IND)	12	11	11
	Batbayaryn Mönkh-Orgil (MGL); Barkhasyn Enkhjin (MGL)	W	O		Batbayaryn Mönkh-Orgil (MGL); Barkhasyn Enkhjin (MGL)	10	3	6
26	Waleed Al-Hajjai (QAT); Maha Faramarzi (QAT)								16	Anthony Amalraj (IND); Madhurika Patkar (IND)	5	13	8	4
									5	Seiya Kishikawa (JPN); Ai Fukuhara (JPN)	11	11	11	11
				29	Rachid El-Boubou (LIB); Lara Kejebachian (LIB)	5	6	4
				5	Seiya Kishikawa (JPN); Ai Fukuhara (JPN)	11	11	11

==== Section 7 ====
1st round	2nd round					3rd round
	8	Lee Jung-woo (KOR); Yang Ha-eun (KOR)	11	11	11
	22	Thavisack Phathaphone (LAO); Sengdavieng Douangpanya (LAO)	5	3	5
						8	Lee Jung-woo (KOR); Yang Ha-eun (KOR)	3	13	4	7
						13	Kim Hyok-bong (PRK); Kim Jong (PRK)	11	11	11	11
	27	Che Chi Pan (MAC); Cheong Cheng I (MAC)	5	2	7
	13	Kim Hyok-bong (PRK); Kim Jong (PRK)	11	11	11

==== Section 8 ====
1st round	2nd round					3rd round
	12	Yang Zi (SIN); Lin Ye (SIN)	11	11	11
	19	Kirill Gerassimenko (KAZ); Yuliya Ryabova (KAZ)	6	5	5
						12	Yang Zi (SIN); Lin Ye (SIN)	11	5	9	4
						2	Zhou Yu (CHN); Wu Yang (CHN)	2	11	11	11
	21	Ajay Suwal (NEP); Nabita Shrestha (NEP)	2	5	5
	2	Zhou Yu (CHN); Wu Yang (CHN)	11	11	11
