= Li Xiaoxia =

Chinese table tennis player

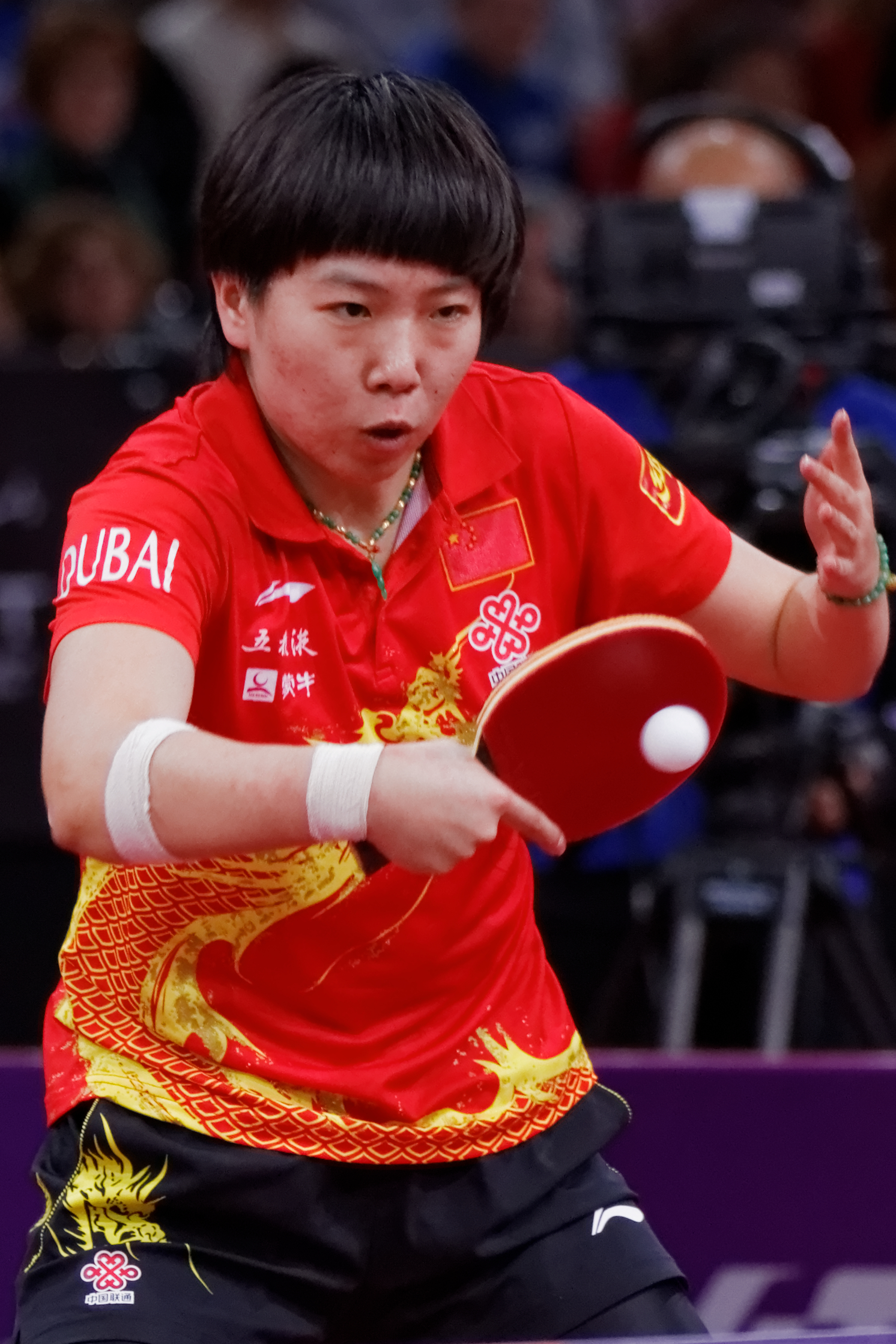

Personal information
- Native name: 李晓霞
- Nationality: Chinese
- Born: 16 January 1988 (age 38) Anshan, Liaoning, China
- Height: 1.74 m (5 ft 9 in)
- Weight: 62 kg (137 lb)

Sport
- Sport: Table tennis
- Club: Shandong Luneng Group
- Playing style: Right-handed, shakehand grip
- Highest ranking: 1 (November 2008)
Medal record
Women's Table Tennis
Representing China
Event	1st	2nd	3rd
Olympic Games	3	1	0
World Championships	9	5	2
World Cup	7	2	0
Total	19	8	2
Olympic Games
Gold medal – first place	2012 London	Singles
Gold medal – first place	2012 London	Team
Gold medal – first place	2016 Rio de Janeiro	Team
Silver medal – second place	2016 Rio de Janeiro	Singles
World Championships
Gold medal – first place	2006 Bremen	Team
Gold medal – first place	2008 Guangzhou	Team
Gold medal – first place	2009 Yokohama	Doubles
Gold medal – first place	2011 Rotterdam	Doubles
Gold medal – first place	2012 Dortmund	Team
Gold medal – first place	2013 Paris	Doubles
Gold medal – first place	2013 Paris	Singles
Gold medal – first place	2014 Tokyo	Team
Gold medal – first place	2016 Kuala Lumpur	Team
Silver medal – second place	2007 Zagreb	Singles
Silver medal – second place	2007 Zagreb	Doubles
Silver medal – second place	2010 Moscow	Team
Silver medal – second place	2011 Rotterdam	Singles
Silver medal – second place	2015 Suzhou	Doubles
Bronze medal – third place	2009 Yokohama	Singles
Bronze medal – third place	2015 Suzhou	Singles
World Cup
Gold medal – first place	2007 Magdeburg	Team
Gold medal – first place	2008 Kuala Lumpur	Singles
Gold medal – first place	2009 Linz	Team
Gold medal – first place	2010 Dubai	Team
Gold medal – first place	2011 Magdeburg	Team
Gold medal – first place	2013 Guangzhou	Team
Gold medal – first place	2015 Dubai	Team
Silver medal – second place	2011 Singapore	Singles
Silver medal – second place	2014 Linz	Singles

Li Xiaoxia (Chinese: 李晓霞; pinyin: Lǐ Xiǎoxiá; born 16 January 1988) is a Chinese table tennis Grand Slam champion.

== Career ==
She trained in the Jiangsu Wuxi Shanhe Club in Wuxi, China. Her trainer is Li Sun, who is also the mentor of Olympic gold medal winner Zhang Yining. As of April 2011, she occupies the top place on the ITTF women's world ranking. In terms of achievements, she is one of the most successful female table tennis players (alongside Ding Ning, Deng Yaping, Wang Nan, Zhang Yining) having won the gold medal in each of the Table Tennis World Cup, the Table Tennis World Championships, and the Olympic Games.

In January 2017, she announced her retirement on social media website Weibo, stating "I have to say goodbye to you even though I feel it a pity to do so. Goodbye, my beloved table tennis. Goodbye, my prestigious Chinese team."

== Career records ==
Singles (as of July 23, 2011)

- Olympic Games: winner (2012).
- World Championships: winner (2013); runner-up (2007, 11); semi-finalist (2009, 2015).
- World Cup appearances: 5. Record: winner (2008); runner-up (2011, 14); 3rd (2009).
- Pro Tour winner (9): China (Shenzhen) Open 2005; Qatar, German, Swedish Open 2007; Singapore, China (Shanghai) Open 2008; China Open 2010, China (Shanghai) Open 2012, Kuwait Open 2016
  Runner-up (5): Qatar Open 2006; Kuwait, Japan Open 2008; Slovenian, German Open 2011.
- Pro Tour Grand Finals appearances: 3. Record: winner (2007); runner-up (2006).
- Asian Games: winner (2010).
- Asian Championships: runner-up (2007, 09).
- Asian Cup: 2nd (2005).

Women's Doubles

- World Championships: winner (2009, 11); runner-up (2007, 15).
- Pro Tour winner (18): China (Wuxi), Austrian Open 2004; Slovenian Open 2006; Croatian, Qatar, Kuwait, Japan, China (Nanjing), German Open 2007; China (Suzhou) Open 2009; China, Austrian Open 2010; Slovenian, Qatar, UAE, German, Austrian Open 2011; Japan Open 2016
  Runner-up (15): Egypt, German, Dutch, Polish, Danish Open 2002; Croatian, China (Kunshan), China (Guangzhou) Open 2006; Slovenian Open 2007; Korea, China (Shanghai) Open 2008; English, China (Suzhou) Open 2011; China (Shanghai) Open 2012; Kuwait Open 2016
- Pro Tour Grand Finals appearances: 3. Record: winner (2007, 2011); SF (2006).
- Asian Games: winner (2006, 10).
- Asian Championships: winner (2007, 09).

Mixed Doubles

- Asian Championships: winner (2009); SF (2005).
- World Junior Championships: winner (2003)

Team

- Olympic Games: Winner (2012, 2016)
- World Championships: winner (2006, 08, 12); runner-up (2010).
- World Team Cup: 1st (2007, 09, 10, 11).
- Asian Games: 1st (2006, 10).
- Asian Championships: 1st (2003, 07, 09).
