= Kim Hyok-bong =

North Korean table tennis player (born 1985)

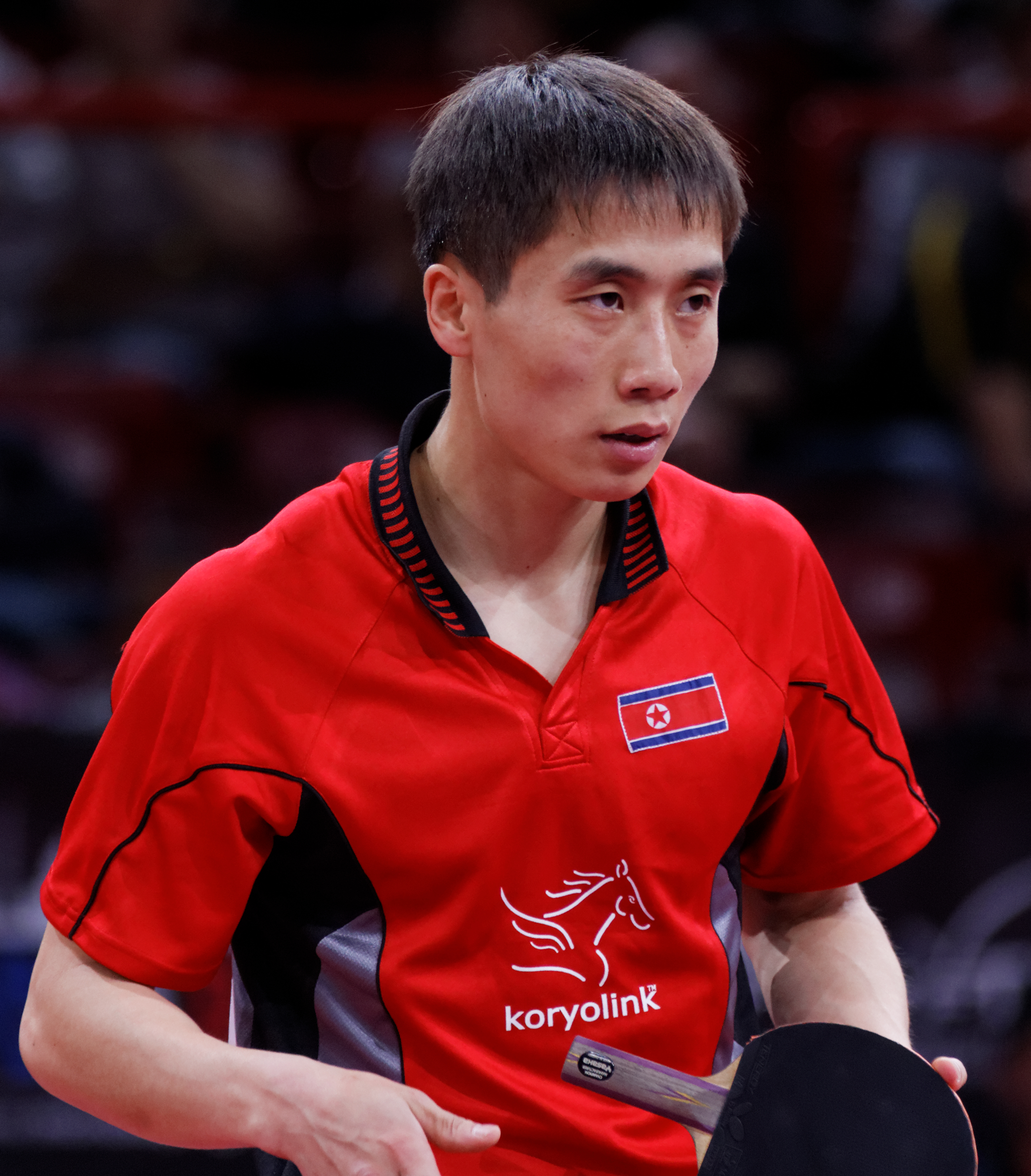
- Kim Hyok-bong at 2013 World Table Tennis Championship

Personal information
- Born: 28 October 1985 (age 40)
- Height: 1.71 m (5 ft 7 1/2 in)
- Weight: 65 kg (143 lb; 10.2 st)

Sport
- Team: April 25 Sports Team

Korean name
- Hangul: 김혁봉
- RR: Gim Hyeokbong
- MR: Kim Hyŏkpong
Medal record
Men's table tennis
Representing North Korea
World Championships
Gold medal – first place	2013 Paris	Mixed Doubles
Bronze medal – third place	2015 Suzhou	Mixed Doubles
Asian Games
Gold medal – first place	2014 Incheon	Mixed Doubles
Asian Championships
Bronze medal – third place	2007 Yangzhou	Mixed Doubles
Bronze medal – third place	2012 Macau	Mixed Doubles
East Asian Games
Gold medal – first place	2013 Tianjin	Mixed Doubles

Kim Hyok-bong (Korean: 김혁봉; born 28 October 1985) is a retired North Korean table tennis player representing the April 25 Sports Team. He competed at the 2008 and 2012 Summer Olympics. At the 2012 Summer Olympics he reached the fourth round, knocking out seeded South Korean Joo Se-hyuk in the third round. He won gold medals in mixed doubles events with Kim Jong at the 2013 World Championships and the 2014 Asian Games. The World Championship gold was the first for DPR Korea since 1977.
