= Raghd Magdy =

Egyptian table tennis player

Personal information
- Nationality: Egyptian
- Born: 7 March 1983 (age 42); Iraq

Sport
- Sport: Table tennis

Raghd Magdy (born 7 March 1983) is an Egyptian table tennis player, born in Iraq. She competed in women's team at the 2012 Summer Olympics in London.
