= Park Young-sook =

South Korean table tennis player

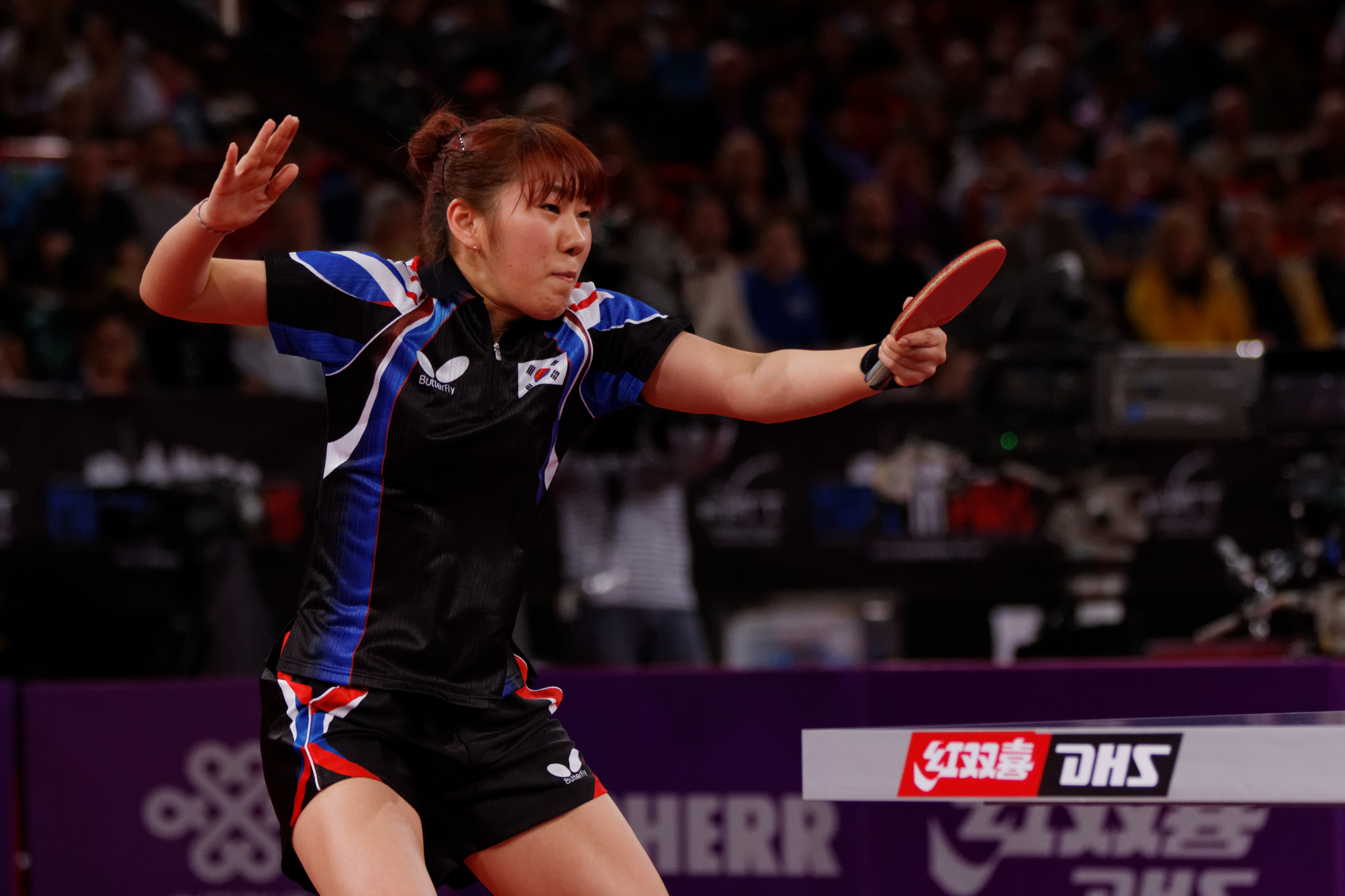

Personal information
- Nationality: South Korea
- Born: December 18, 1988 (age 37)

Sport
- Sport: Table tennis
- Playing style: left-handed, shakehand grip
- Highest ranking: 77 (May 2013)
Medal record
Women's table tennis
Representing South Korea
World Championships
| Silver medal – second place | 2013 Paris | Mixed Doubles |
Asian Championships
| Gold medal – first place | 2013 Busan | Mixed Doubles |
| Bronze medal – third place | 2013 Busan | Doubles |
| Bronze medal – third place | 2012 Macau | Doubles |
| Bronze medal – third place | 2009 Lucknow | Doubles |

- Park Young-sook
- Hangul: 박영숙
- RR: Bak Yeongsuk
- MR: Pak Yŏngsuk

Park Young-sook (born December 18, 1988) is a South Korean table tennis player. Her husband is Lee Sang-su. She won two doubles titles at the ITTF World Tour, the first one was in 2009.

She won Mixed doubles Champions with Lee Sang-su at the 2013 Asian Table Tennis Championships.
