= Hou Yingchao =

Chinese table tennis player

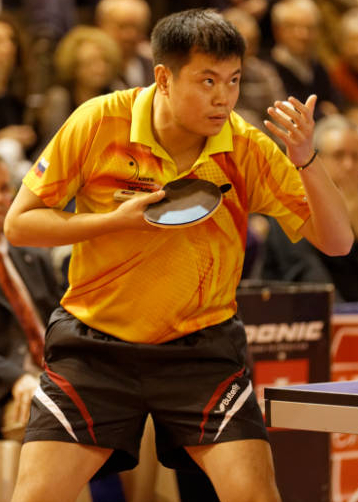
- Hou playing for the Russian club UMMC Ekaterinburg in the 2013 ETTU Cup

Personal information
- Born: 15 June 1980 (age 46) Beijing, China
- Height: 185 cm (6 ft 1 in)

Sport
- Sport: Table tennis
- Club: Kinoshita Meister Tokyo
- Playing style: Right-handed shakehand grip
- Highest ranking: 10 (January 2007)
Medal record
Representing China
Asian Championships
Gold medal – first place	2003 Jeju	Men's team
Universiade
Silver medal – second place	2007 Bangkok	Men's singles
Bronze medal – third place	2007 Bangkok	Men's doubles

Hou Yingchao (Chinese: 侯英超; pinyin: Hóu Yīngchāo, born 15 June 1980) is a Chinese table tennis player who plays a chopping style.

== Association change ==
In 2018, Hou registered with Table Tennis Canada and played in the ITTF World Tour under Canada's flag. He did so to continue playing in ITTF tournaments, without having acquired Canadian nationality or giving up his Chinese nationality. Indeed, a year later he played in the 2019 All China Table Tennis Championships, and by beating Wang Chuqin 4–0 in the final, he became the tournament's oldest ever champion. He first won the tournament in 2000.
