= Rao Jingwen =

Chinese table tennis player

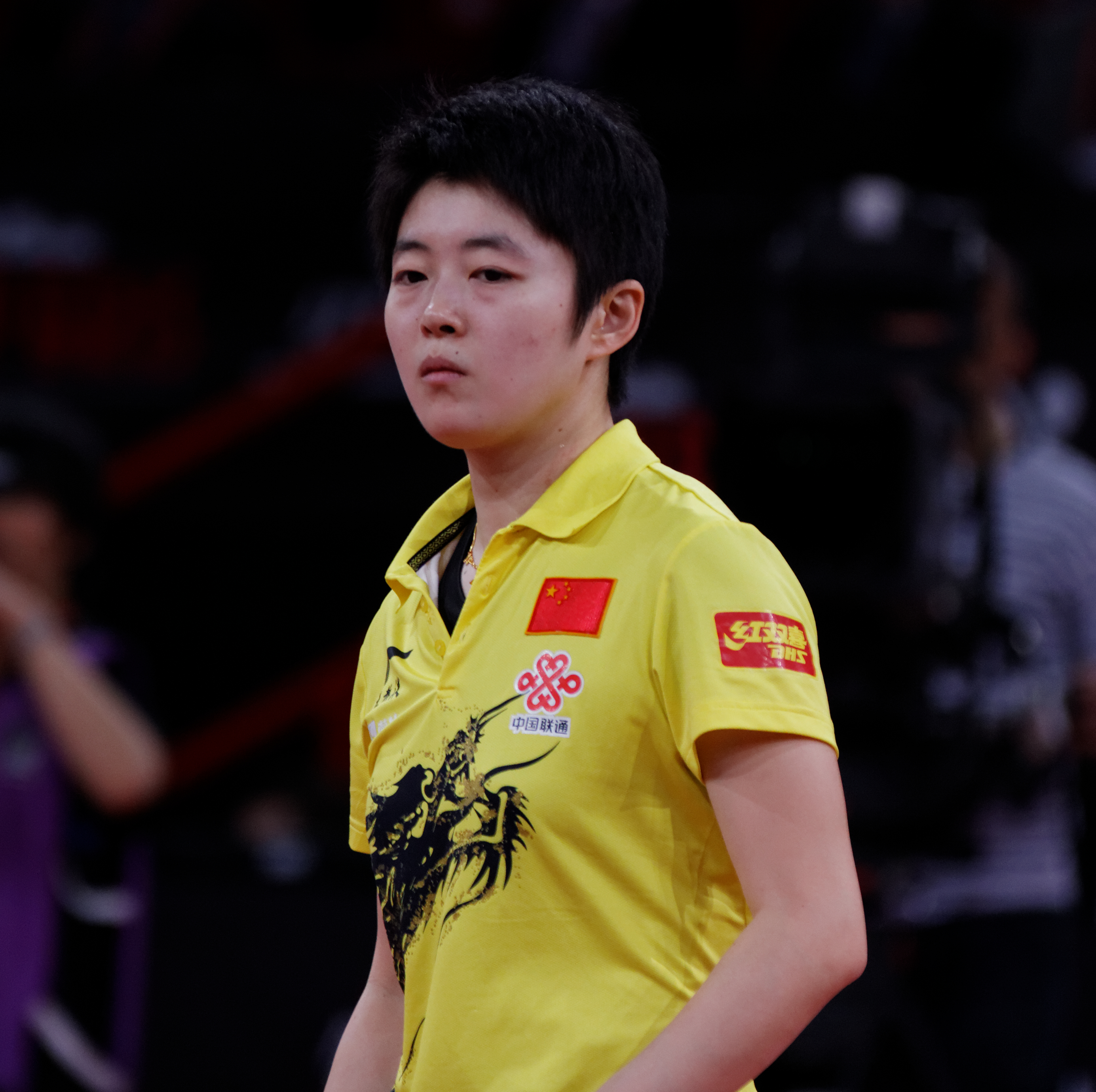
- 2013 World Table Tennis Championships

Medal record

Women's Table tennis

Representing China

World Table Tennis Championships
Bronze medal – third place	2013 Paris	Mixed doubles

Rao Jingwen is a Chinese table tennis player. She won the bronze medal at the 2013 World Table Tennis Championships in the mixed doubles competition with partner Wang Liqin.
