= Cheung Yuk =

Hong Kong-Chinese table tennis player

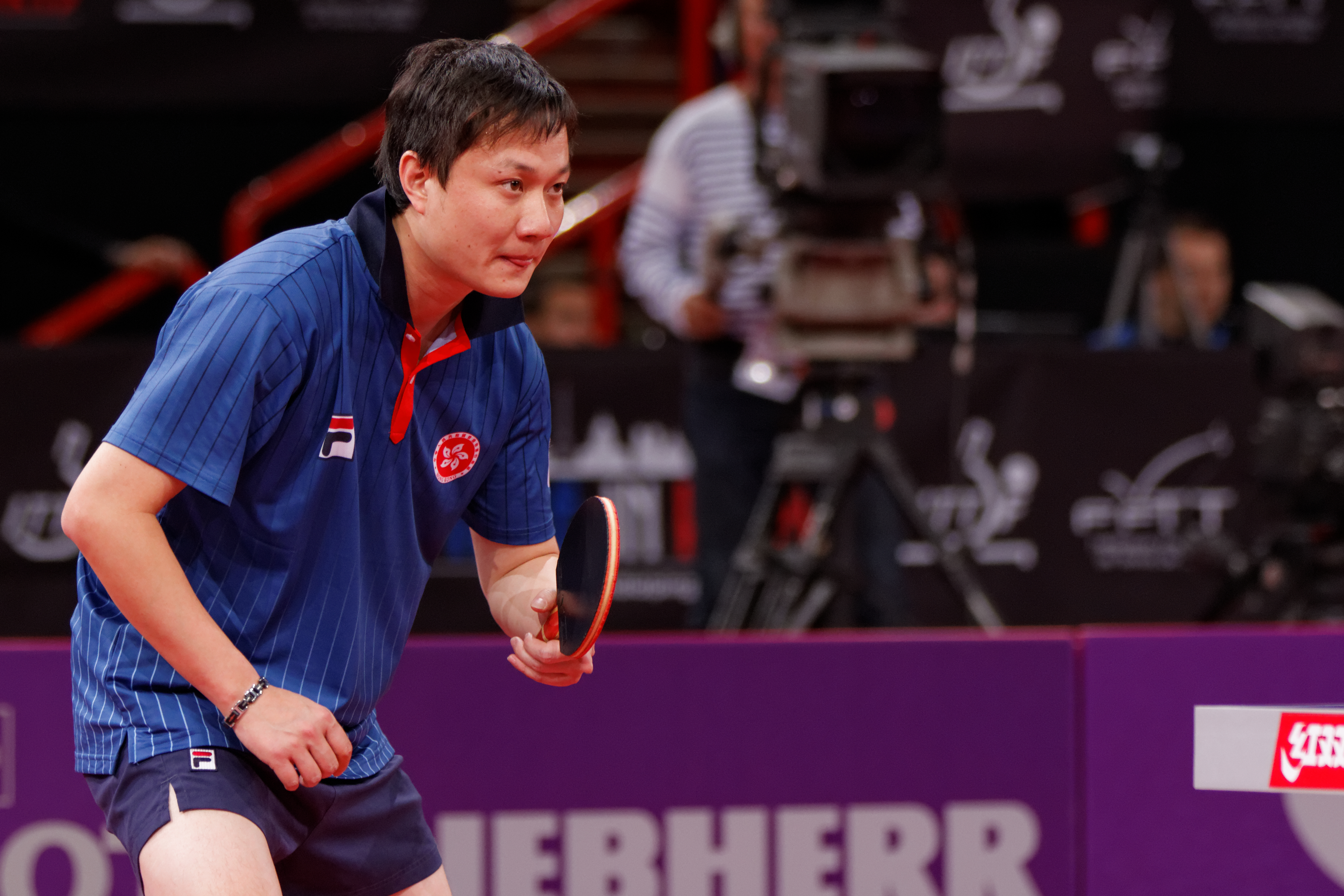
- 2013 World Table Tennis Championships

Personal information
- Nationality: China
- Born: 28 October 1981 (age 44) Jiangsu, China
- Height: 1.55 m (5 ft 1 in)
- Weight: 83 kg (183 lb)

Sport
- Sport: Table tennis
- Playing style: Left-handed, shakehand
- Equipment: Butterfly Bracy
- Highest ranking: 12 (July 2008)
- Current ranking: 80 (February 2013)
Medal record
Men's table tennis
Representing Hong Kong
World Championships
Bronze medal – third place	2006 Bremen	Team
Bronze medal – third place	2008 Guangzhou	Team
Bronze medal – third place	2011 Rotterdam	Mixed doubles
Bronze medal – third place	2013 Paris	Mixed doubles
Asian Games
Gold medal – first place	2002 Busan	Mixed doubles
Silver medal – second place	2010 Guangzhou	Mixed doubles
Bronze medal – third place	2002 Busan	Team
Bronze medal – third place	2006 Doha	Team

Cheung Yuk (Chinese: 張鈺; pinyin: Zhāng Yù; Jyutping: zoeng^{1} juk^{6}; born 28 October 1981 in Jiangsu, People's Republic of China) is a Hong Kong table tennis player. As of February 2013, Cheung was ranked no. 80 in the world by the International Table Tennis Federation (ITTF). Cheung is also left-handed, and uses the offensive, shakehand grip.

== Table tennis career ==
Representing his adopted nation Hong Kong, Cheung made his official debut at the 2000 Summer Olympics in Sydney, where he competed in both the singles and doubles tournament. For his first event, the men's doubles, Cheung and his partner Leung Chu Yan won the preliminary pool round against Greece's Kalinikos Kreanga and Ntaniel Tsiokas, and Australia's Simon Gerada and Mark Smythe, attaining two victories, four games, and a total score of 98 points. The Hong Kong pair progressed to the knock-out stage, but they narrowly lost to the South Korean duo Ryu Seung-Min and Lee Chul-Seung, with a set score of 2–3. In the men's singles, Cheung defeated Brazil's Hugo Hoyama and Canada's Kurt Liu for a spot on the knock-out stage, by placing first in the preliminary pool round, with two victories and a score of 182 points. Cheung, however, lost the first round for the second time to Japan's Koji Matsushita, receiving a unanimous set score of 0–3.

At the 2002 Asian Games in Busan, South Korea, Cheung and his partner Tie Ya Na defeated the host nation's Ryu Seung-Min and Ryu Ji-Hae for the gold medal in the mixed doubles, with a sudden death set score of 3–4.

Two years later, Cheung qualified for the men's doubles at the 2004 Summer Olympics in Athens, by being selected as one of the top 8 seeded teams chosen from ITTF. Reuniting with his partner Leung Chu Yan, Cheung lost the third preliminary round match of the men's doubles to Russian duo Dmitry Mazunov and Alexei Smirnov, with a unanimous set score of 0–4.

Eight years after competing in his last Olympics, Cheung qualified for his third Hong Kong team, as a 39-year-old, at the 2008 Summer Olympics in Beijing, by claiming the men's singles title from the Final World Qualification Tournament in Budapest, Hungary. Cheung joined with his fellow players and former rivals Ko Lai Chak and Li Ching for the inaugural men's team event. He and his team placed second in the preliminary pool round, earning a total of six points, two victories (against Nigeria and Russia), and a single defeat from the Japanese trio Yo Kan, Seiya Kishikawa, and Jun Mizutani. The Hong Kong team offered another shot for the bronze medal by defeating Chinese Taipei in the first play-off. Cheung and his team, however, finished only in fifth place, after losing out their second play-off to South Korea (led by defending Olympic singles champion Ryu Seung-Min), receiving a final set score of 1–3.

Being chosen as one of the top 16 seeded players, Cheung received three byes in the preliminary round of his second event, the men's singles, before losing out to Swedish table tennis player and six-time Olympian Jörgen Persson, with a set score of 1–4.

At the 2010 Asian Games in Guangzhou, China, Cheung and his new partner Jiang Huajun captured the silver medal in the mixed doubles, with a set score of 1–4, losing out to the host nation's duo Xu Xin and Guo Yan.
