= Irene Ivancan =

German table tennis player

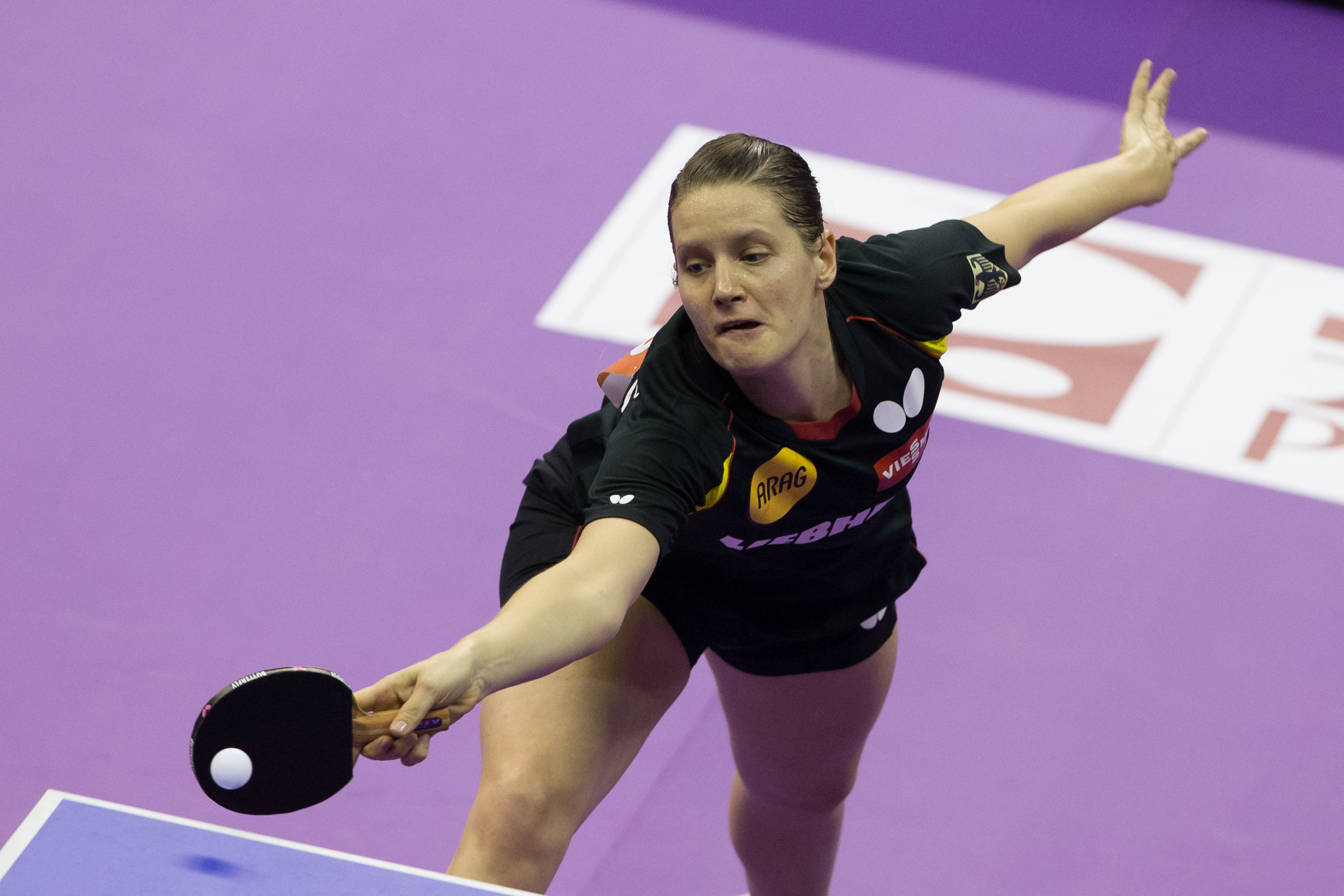

Personal information
- Nationality: German
- Born: 22 July 1983 (age 41); Stuttgart, West Germany

Sport
- Sport: Table tennis

Irene Ivancan (born 22 July 1983) is a German table tennis player, born in Stuttgart. She competed in women's team at the 2012 Summer Olympics in London.
