= Kim Jong (table tennis) =

North Korean table tennis player

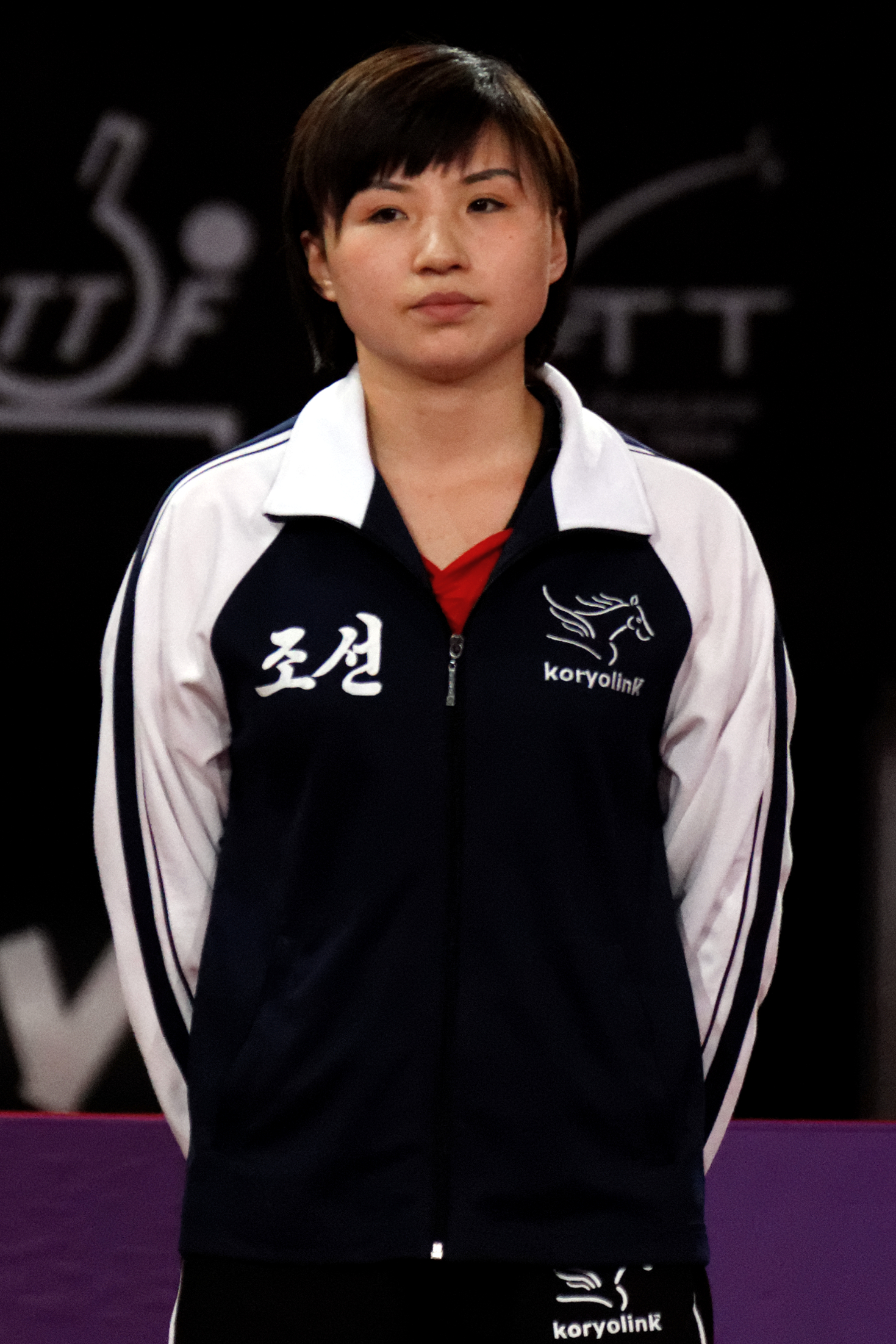
- Kim at the 2013 World Table Tennis Championships

Personal information
- Born: 19 April 1989 (age 37)
- Height: 1.60 m (5 ft 3 in)
- Weight: 52 kg (115 lb; 8.2 st)

Sport
- Team: April 25 Sports Team

Korean name
- Hangul: 김정
- RR: Gim Jeong
- MR: Kim Chŏng
Medal record
Women's Table tennis
Representing North Korea
World Championships
Gold medal – first place	2013 Paris	Mixed Doubles
Bronze medal – third place	2015 Suzhou	Mixed Doubles
Asian Games
Gold medal – first place	2014 Incheon	Mixed Doubles
Bronze medal – third place	2014 Incheon	Doubles
Bronze medal – third place	2014 Incheon	Team
Asian Championships
Bronze medal – third place	2007 Yangzhou	Mixed Doubles
Bronze medal – third place	2012 Macau	Mixed Doubles
East Asian Games
Gold medal – first place	2013 Tianjin	Mixed Doubles

Kim Jong (born 19 April 1989, South Hamgyong Province) is a North Korean table tennis player. She competed for North Korea at the 2008 and 2012 Summer Olympics. At the 2008 Olympics she competed in the women's singles only, and at the 2012 Summer Olympics she competed in the women's singles and the women's team events. She won gold medals in mixed doubles events with Kim Hyok-bong at the 2013 World Championships and the 2014 Asian Games.

Kim represents the April 25 Sports Team.
