= Ri Mi-gyong =

North Korean table tennis player

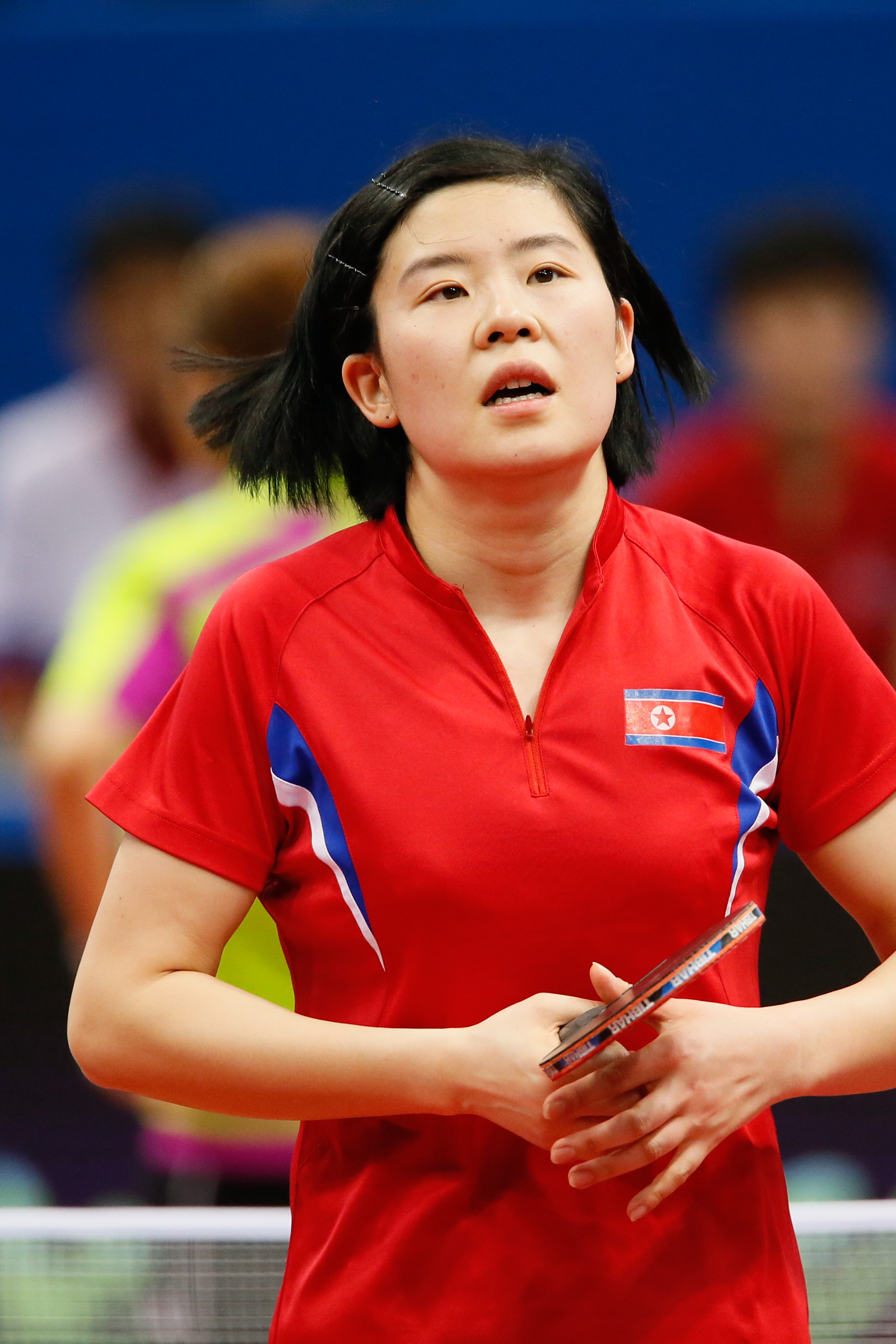
- Ri in 2017

Medal record

Women's table tennis

Representing North Korea

World Championships
Bronze medal – third place	2016 Kuala Lumpur	Team

Ri Mi-gyong (리미경, Korean pronunciation: [ɾi.mi.ɡjʌŋ]; born 30 September 1990, Kangweon province) is a North Korean table tennis player. She competed for North Korea at the 2012 Summer Olympics in the women's team event. She competed in the same event at the 2016 Summer Olympics.
