= Renáta Štrbíková =

Czech table tennis player

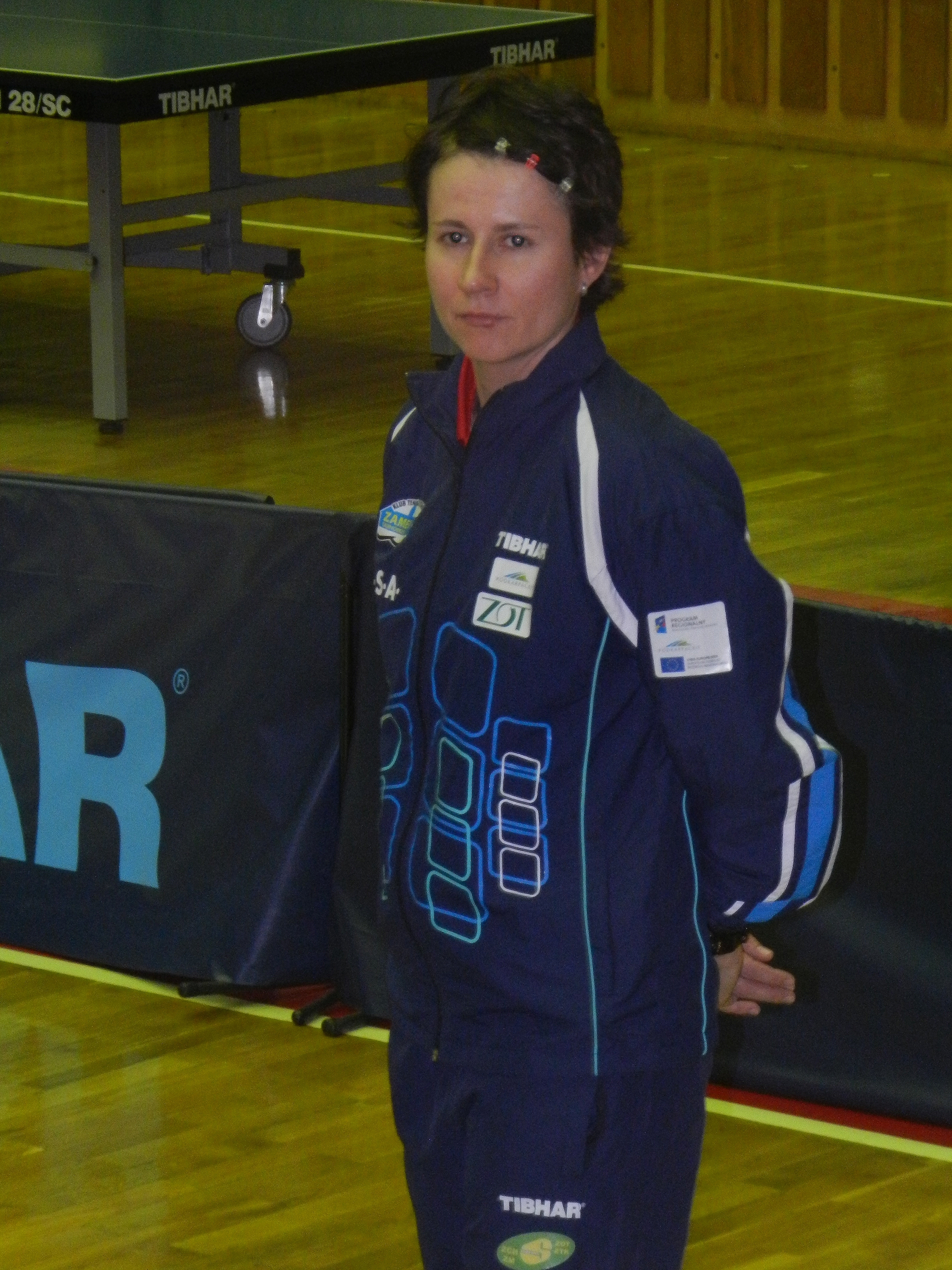

Personal information
- Nationality: Czech
- Born: 6 August 1979 (age 46) Havířov, Czechoslovakia

Sport
- Sport: Table tennis
Medal record
Women's table tennis
Representing Malta
Games of the Small States of Europe
Gold medal – first place	2025 Andorra la Vella	Doubles
Silver medal – second place	2025 Andorra la Vella	Team

Renáta Štrbíková (born 6 August 1979) is a Czech table tennis player, born in Havířov. She competed in women's singles and women's doubles at the 2004 Summer Olympics in Athens.
