= Aleksandra Privalova =

Belarusian table tennis player

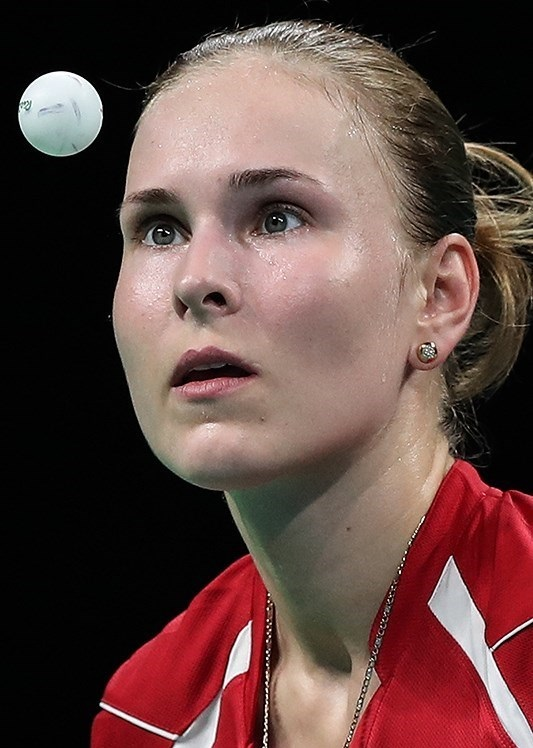

Personal information
- Full name: Aleksandra Valentinovna Privalova
- Nationality: Belarusian
- Born: October 29, 1987 (age 38) Minsk, Belarus

Sport
- Sport: Table tennis

Aleksandra Valentinovna Privalova (Belarusian: Аляксандра Валянцінаўна Прывалава, Russian: Александра Валентиновна Привалова; born 29 October 1987 in Minsk) is a Belarusian table tennis player. She competed for Belarus at the 2012 Summer Olympics and the 2016 Summer Olympics. In the women's singles at the 2012 Summer Olympics, she beat Han Xing in the first round before losing to Liu Jia in the second.
