= Katarzyna Grzybowska =

Polish table tennis player

Katarzyna Grzybowska (born 30 April 1989, Siedlce) is a Polish table tennis player. At the 2012 Summer Olympics, she was part of the Polish women's team in the team table tennis event. She competed at the 2016 Summer Olympics in the women's singles event, in which she was eliminated in the second round by Kim Song-i, and as part of the Polish team in the women's team event.

On club level she competed for Panathinaikos during the 2021-22 season.
