= 2017 ITTF World Tour =

Details
- Duration: 17 January 2017 – 17 December 2017
- Edition: 22nd
- Tournaments: 12 + Grand Finals
- Categories: World Tour Platinum (6); World Tour (6); Grand Finals (1)

Achievements (singles)
- Most titles: Men: (Germany) Dimitrij Ovtcharov (4); Women: (China) Chen Meng (3)
- Points leader: Men: (Germany) Dimitrij Ovtcharov (1,550); Women: (China) Chen Meng (2,162)

The Seamaster 2017 ITTF World Tour was the 22nd season of the International Table Tennis Federation's professional table tennis world tour.

The events for the 2017 tour were split into two tiers: World Tour Platinum and World Tour. The Platinum events offered higher prize money and more points towards the ITTF World Tour standings, which determined the qualifiers for the 2017 ITTF World Tour Grand Finals in December.

On 12 January 2017 it was announced that Chinese shipping company Seamaster had agreed a four-year sponsorship deal with the ITTF World Tour.

== Schedule ==
Below is the schedule released by the ITTF:

World Tour Platinum
World Tour
Grand Finals

Tour	Event	Location	Venue	Date		Prize money (USD)	Ref.
Tour	Event	Location	Venue	Start	Finish	Prize money (USD)	Ref.
1	(Hungary) Hungarian Open	Budapest	SYMA Sports and Conference Centre	January 19	January 22	120,000	
2	India Open	New Delhi	Thyagaraj Sports Complex	February 16	February 19	150,000	
3	Qatar Open	Doha	Ali Bin Hamad al-Attiyah Arena	February 23	February 26	220,000	
4	(South Korea) Korea Open	Incheon	Namdong Gymnasium	April 20	April 23	155,000	
5	Japan Open	Tokyo	Tokyo Metropolitan Gymnasium	June 16	June 18	220,000	
6	China Open	Chengdu	Sichuan Provincial Gymnasium	June 22	June 25	220,000	
7	(Australia) Australian Open	Gold Coast	Gold Coast Sports & Leisure Centre	July 4	July 7	400,000	
8	(Bulgaria) Bulgarian Open	Panagyurishte	Arena Asarel	August 17	August 20	130,000	
9	(Czech Republic) Czech Open	Olomouc	OMEGA Sport Center	August 24	August 27	140,000	
10	(Austria) Austrian Open	Linz	TipsArena Linz	September 19	September 24	210,000	
11	(Germany) German Open	Magdeburg	GETEC Arena	November 10	November 12	210,000	
12	(Sweden) Swedish Open	Stockholm	Eriksdalshallen	November 16	November 19	130,000	
13	(Kazakhstan) Grand Finals	Astana	"Daulet" Sports Complex	December 14	December 17	1,000,000	

== Events ==
=== Winners ===
==== World Tour Platinum ====
Event	Men's singles	Women's singles	Men's doubles	Women's doubles	U21 Men's singles	U21 Women's singles
Qatar Open	(China) Ma Long	(China) Chen Meng	(Japan) Masataka Morizono (Japan) Yuya Oshima	(China) Chen Meng (China) Wang Manyu	(Hong Kong) Lam Siu Hang	(Hong Kong) Doo Hoi Kem
Japan Open	(China) Ma Long	(China) Sun Yingsha	(China) Ma Long (China) Xu Xin	(China) Chen Xingtong (China) Sun Yingsha	(South Korea) Lim Jong-hoon	(Japan) Yuka Umemura
China Open	(Germany) Dimitrij Ovtcharov	(China) Ding Ning	(Japan) Jin Ueda (Japan) Maharu Yoshimura	(China) Ding Ning (China) Liu Shiwen	(Japan) Yuto Kizukuri	(Japan) Maki Shiomi
(Australia) Australian Open	(Belarus) Vladimir Samsonov	(China) Chen Meng	(South Korea) Jang Woo-jin (South Korea) Park Gang-hyeon	(China) Chen Meng (China) Zhu Yuling	(South Korea) Park Gang-hyeon	(Japan) Saki Shibata
(Austria) Austrian Open	(China) Lin Gaoyuan	(China) Wang Manyu	(Japan) Koki Niwa (Japan) Jin Ueda	(China) Chen Xingtong (China) Sun Yingsha	(China) Xue Fei	(China) Zhang Rui
(Germany) German Open	(Germany) Dimitrij Ovtcharov	(China) Chen Meng	(South Korea) Jung Young-sik (South Korea) Lee Sang-su	(Japan) Hina Hayata (Japan) Miu Hirano	(China) Xue Fei	(China) Chen Ke

==== World Tour ====
Event	Men's singles	Women's singles	Men's doubles	Women's doubles	U21 Men's singles	U21 Women's singles
(Hungary) Hungarian Open	(China) Yan An	(China) Chen Xingtong	(China) Fang Bo (China) Zhou Yu	(China) Chen Xingtong (China) Li Jiayi	(Kazakhstan) Kirill Gerassimenko	(Singapore) Zeng Jian
India Open	(Germany) Dimitrij Ovtcharov	(Japan) Sakura Mori	(Japan) Masataka Morizono (Japan) Yuya Oshima	(Sweden) Matilda Ekholm (Hungary) Georgina Póta	(Japan) Asuka Sakai	(Japan) Sakura Mori
(South Korea) Korea Open	(Germany) Timo Boll	(Singapore) Feng Tianwei	(South Korea) Jang Woo-jin (South Korea) Jeong Sang-eun	(Germany) Shan Xiaona (Germany) Petrissa Solja	(South Korea) Lim Jong-hoon	(Japan) Minami Ando
(Bulgaria) Bulgarian Open	(Germany) Dimitrij Ovtcharov	(Japan) Kasumi Ishikawa	(Japan) Jin Ueda (Japan) Maharu Yoshimura	(Japan) Kasumi Ishikawa (Japan) Mima Ito	(Japan) Mizuki Oikawa	(Japan) Mizuki Morizono
(Czech Republic) Czech Open	(Japan) Tomokazu Harimoto	(Japan) Mima Ito	(Germany) Patrick Franziska (Denmark) Jonathan Groth	(Japan) Hina Hayata (Japan) Mima Ito	(France) Can Akkuzu	(Puerto Rico) Adriana Díaz
(Sweden) Swedish Open	(China) Xu Xin	(China) Chen Xingtong	(China) Fan Zhendong (China) Xu Xin	(Japan) Hina Hayata (Japan) Mima Ito	(South Korea) Park Gang-hyeon	(China) Zhang Rui

=== Finals ===
==== World Tour Platinum ====
===== Qatar Open =====
Category	Winners	Runners-up	Score
Men's singles	(China) Ma Long	(China) Fan Zhendong	4–2 (11–8, 11–8, 11–7, 5–11, 6–11, 11–4)
Women's singles	(China) Chen Meng	(China) Wang Manyu	4–1 (12–10, 11–9, 11–6, 2–11, 11–6)
Men's doubles	(Japan) Masataka Morizono (Japan) Yuya Oshima	(Sweden) Kristian Karlsson (Sweden) Mattias Karlsson	3–1 (9–11, 11–5, 11–5, 11–9)
Women's doubles	(China) Chen Meng (China) Wang Manyu	(South Korea) Jeon Ji-hee (South Korea) Yang Ha-eun	3–1 (11–4, 11–6, 4–11, 11–6)

===== Japan Open =====
Category	Winners	Runners-up	Score
Men's singles	(China) Ma Long	(China) Fan Zhendong	4–1 (11–7, 5–11, 11–7, 11–8, 11–5)
Women's singles	(China) Sun Yingsha	(China) Chen Meng	4–3 (9–11, 11–9, 8–11, 8–11, 11–7, 11–9, 11–8)
Men's doubles	(China) Xu Xin (China) Ma Long	(Japan) Koki Niwa (Japan) Maharu Yoshimura	3–0 (11–9, 11–3, 11–7)
Women's doubles	(China) Chen Xingtong (China) Sun Yingsha	(South Korea) Jeon Ji-hee (South Korea) Yang Ha-eun	3–2 (10–12, 8–11 ,11–3 ,11–7, 11–6)

===== China Open =====
Category	Winners	Runners-up	Score
Men's singles	(Germany) Dimitrij Ovtcharov	(Germany) Timo Boll	4–3 (17–15, 7–11, 12–10, 11–9, 7–11, 6–11, 12–10)
Women's singles	(China) Ding Ning	(China) Sun Yingsha	4–1 (8–11, 11–9, 11–4, 11–7, 11–6)
Men's doubles	(Japan) Jin Ueda (Japan) Maharu Yoshimura	(Japan) Tomokazu Harimoto (Japan) Yuto Kizukuri	3–1 (12–10, 9–11, 11–8, 11–9)
Women's doubles	(China) Ding Ning (China) Liu Shiwen	(China) Chen Meng (China) Zhu Yuling	3–1 (9–11, 11–7, 11–4, 12–10)

===== Australian Open =====
Category	Winners	Runners-up	Score
Men's singles	(Belarus) Vladimir Samsonov	(France) Simon Gauzy	4–1 (11–13, 11–8, 11–5, 11–8, 11–8)
Women's singles	(China) Chen Meng	(China) Wang Manyu	4–2 (3–11, 12–10, 3–11, 12–10, 11–2, 11–7)
Men's doubles	(South Korea) Jang Woo-jin (South Korea) Park Gang-hyeon	(Chinese Taipei) Chen Chien-an (Chinese Taipei) Chiang Hung-chieh	3–1 (11–2, 11–13, 11–5, 11–6)
Women's doubles	(China) Chen Meng (China) Zhu Yuling	(China) Chen Xingtong (China) Wang Manyu	3–0 (11–8, 11–9, 11–7)

===== Austrian Open =====
Category	Winners	Runners-up	Score
Men's singles	(China) Lin Gaoyuan	(China) Yan An	4–1 (12–10, 11–9, 12–10, 10–12, 11–7)
Women's singles	(China) Wang Manyu	(China) Gu Yuting	4–0 (11–9, 12–10, 11–2, 11–9)
Men's doubles	(Japan) Koki Niwa (Japan) Jin Ueda	(Germany) Ruwen Filus (Germany) Ricardo Walther	3–1 (11–7, 9–11, 11–9, 11–8)
Women's doubles	(China) Chen Xingtong (China) Sun Yingsha	(Japan) Honoka Hashimoto (Japan) Hitomi Sato	3–2 (4–11, 11–7, 7–11, 12–10, 11–4)

===== German Open =====
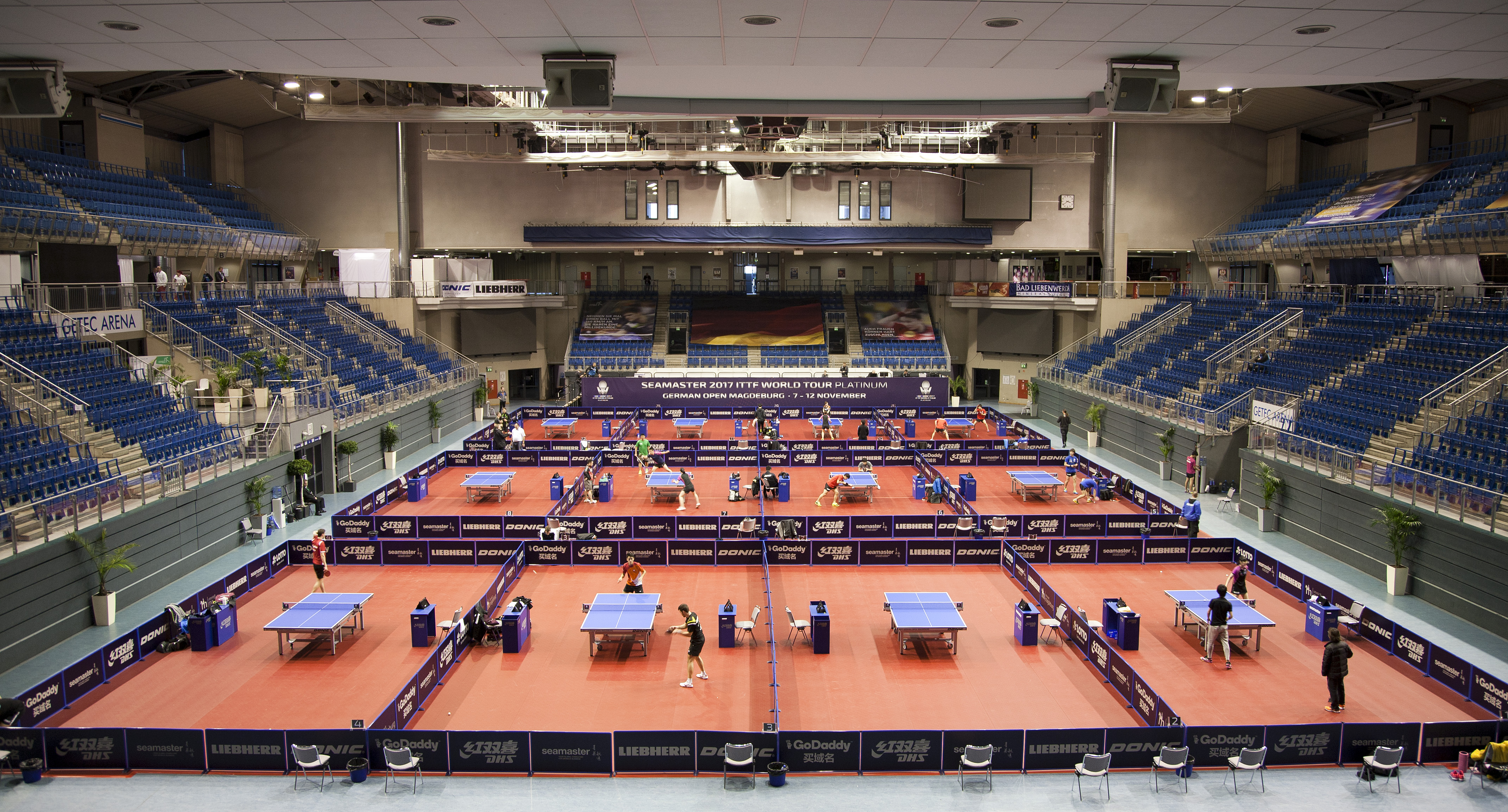
ITTF World Tour 2017 German Open GETEC Arena

Category	Winners	Runners-up	Score
Men's singles	(Germany) Dimitrij Ovtcharov	(Germany) Timo Boll	4–3 (9–11, 11–5, 11–9, 6–11, 11–7, 7–11, 11–6)
Women's singles	(China) Chen Meng	(China) Zhu Yuling	4–3 (9–11, 8–11, 13–11, 9–11, 13–11, 11–9, 11–4)
Men's doubles	(South Korea) Jung Young-sik (South Korea) Lee Sang-su	(Japan) Tomokazu Harimoto (Japan) Yuto Kizukuri	3–2 (8–11, 3–11, 11–5, 16–14, 11–6)
Women's doubles	(Japan) Hina Hayata (Japan) Miu Hirano	(Chinese Taipei) Chen Szu-yu (Chinese Taipei) Cheng I-ching	3–0 (11–7, 11–8, 11–9)

==== World Tour ====
===== Hungarian Open =====
Category	Winners	Runners-up	Score
Men's singles	(China) Yan An	(China) Shang Kun	4–2 (13–11, 6–11, 11–7, 11–6, 10–12, 11–8)
Women's singles	(China) Chen Xingtong	(China) Wen Jia	4–1 (13–11, 8–11, 11–9, 11–9, 11–9)
Men's doubles	(China) Fang Bo (China) Zhou Yu	(Brazil) Hugo Calderano (Brazil) Gustavo Tsuboi	3–1 (11–6, 6–11, 11–8, 11–8)
Women's doubles	(China) Chen Xingtong (China) Li Jiayi	(Sweden) Matilda Ekholm (Hungary) Georgina Póta	3–1 (11–4, 11–6, 9–11, 11–8)

===== India Open =====
Category	Winners	Runners-up	Score
Men's singles	(Germany) Dimitrij Ovtcharov	(Japan) Tomokazu Harimoto	4–0 (11–6, 11–8, 11–4, 14–12)
Women's singles	(Japan) Sakura Mori	(Sweden) Matilda Ekholm	4–3 (7–11, 11–5, 11–8, 12–10, 6–11, 8–11, 11–6)
Men's doubles	(Japan) Masataka Morizono (Japan) Yuya Oshima	(Germany) Ruwen Filus (Germany) Ricardo Walther	3–1 (9–11, 11–7, 11–6, 11–9)
Women's doubles	(Sweden) Matilda Ekholm (Hungary) Georgina Póta	(Hong Kong) Doo Hoi Kem (Hong Kong) Lee Ho Ching	3–2 (9–11, 11–3, 5–11, 14–12, 11–8)

===== Korea Open =====
Category	Winners	Runners-up	Score
Men's singles	(Germany) Timo Boll	(Germany) Patrick Franziska	4–0 (11–8, 12–10, 12–10, 11–6)
Women's singles	(Singapore) Feng Tianwei	(Japan) Kasumi Ishikawa	4–2 (12–10, 6–11, 11–9, 5–11, 11–8, 11–9)
Men's doubles	(South Korea) Jang Woo-jin (South Korea) Jeong Sang-eun	(Germany) Patrick Franziska (Denmark) Jonathan Groth	3–2 (11–9, 8–11, 12–10, 7–11, 12–10)
Women's doubles	(Germany) Shan Xiaona (Germany) Petrissa Solja	(Japan) Hina Hayata (Japan) Mima Ito	3–1 (11–4, 11–3, 3–11, 11–9)

===== Bulgarian Open =====
Category	Winners	Runners-up	Score
Men's singles	(Germany) Dimitrij Ovtcharov	(Japan) Kenta Matsudaira	4–1 (9–11, 11–7, 11–4, 11–9, 11–9)
Women's singles	(Japan) Kasumi Ishikawa	(Japan) Mima Ito	4–0 (12–10, 11–4, 11–7, 11–5)
Men's doubles	(Japan) Jin Ueda (Japan) Maharu Yoshimura	(India) Soumyajit Ghosh (India) Sathiyan Gnanasekaran	3–2 (11–13, 11–7, 11–4, 6–11, 11–5)
Women's doubles	(Japan) Kasumi Ishikawa (Japan) Mima Ito	(Sweden) Matilda Ekholm (Hungary) Georgina Póta	3–1 (6–11, 11–8, 11–9, 11–5)

===== Czech Open =====
Category	Winners	Runners-up	Score
Men's singles	(Japan) Tomokazu Harimoto	(Germany) Timo Boll	4–2 (11–3, 4–11, 8–11, 11–9, 11–6, 11–9)
Women's singles	(Japan) Mima Ito	(Japan) Kasumi Ishikawa	4–1 (11–5, 15–13, 11–3, 9–11, 11–4)
Men's doubles	(Germany) Patrick Franziska (Denmark) Jonathan Groth	(Japan) Jin Ueda (Japan) Maharu Yoshimura	3–1 (11–6, 8–11, 11–9, 11–8)
Women's doubles	(Japan) Hina Hayata (Japan) Mima Ito	(Sweden) Matilda Ekholm (Hungary) Georgina Póta	3–2 (11–5, 8–11, 8–11, 11–6, 11–8)

===== Swedish Open =====
Category	Winners	Runners-up	Score
Men's singles	(China) Xu Xin	(China) Fan Zhendong	4–1 (6–11, 11–7, 11–9, 11–6, 11–2)
Women's singles	(China) Chen Xingtong	(China) Ding Ning	4–3 (11–9, 15–13, 10–12, 11–6, 6–11, 6–11, 11–9)
Men's doubles	(China) Fan Zhendong (China) Xu Xin	(Hong Kong) Ho Kwan Kit (Hong Kong) Wong Chun Ting	3–1 (6–11, 11–5, 11–6, 11–8)
Women's doubles	(Japan) Hina Hayata (Japan) Mima Ito	(China) Chen Meng (China) Zhu Yuling	3–1 (11–8, 1–11, 11–9, 11–9)

== Standings ==
=== Singles ===
Points were accumulated during the singles tournaments at each of the twelve ITTF World Tour events. The 15 men and 16 women who played in at least five events and accumulated the largest number of points were invited to play in the Grand Finals in Astana in December. Kazakhstan's Kirill Gerassimenko was also invited to take part in the men's singles event, to ensure that the host nation was represented.

Men's singles – final standings

Rank	after all 12 events	Events	Points
1	(Germany) Dimitrij Ovtcharov	5	1,550
2	(China) Ma Long	3	1,050
3	(Germany) Timo Boll	5	1,000
4	(China) Fan Zhendong	5	975
5	(China) Lin Gaoyuan	6	744
6	(China) Xu Xin	5	650
7	(Japan) Tomokazu Harimoto	9	641
8	(China) Yan An	4	616
9	(France) Simon Gauzy	7	615
10	(Belarus) Vladimir Samsonov	6	614
11	(Japan) Kenta Matsudaira	10	613
12	(China) Fang Bo	5	594
13	(Japan) Koki Niwa	9	560
14	(Hong Kong) Wong Chun Ting	6	433
15	(Japan) Masaki Yoshida	5	375
16	(Japan) Jun Mizutani	3	350
17	(Japan) Yuya Oshima	9	347
18	(Chinese Taipei) Chuang Chih-yuan	7	332
19	(South Korea) Lee Sang-su	4	316
20	(Portugal) Marcos Freitas	6	272
21	(England) Paul Drinkhall	5	264
22	(Sweden) Kristian Karlsson	8	253
23	(Germany) Ruwen Filus	8	236
24	(Japan) Maharu Yoshimura	10	228
25	(China) Liang Jingkun	6	225
104	(Kazakhstan) Kirill Gerassimenko	5	16

Women's singles – final standings

Rank	after all 12 events	Events	Points
1	(China) Chen Meng	8	2,162
2	(China) Wang Manyu	5	1,400
3	(China) Sun Yingsha	3	1,000
4	(Japan) Kasumi Ishikawa	10	963
5	(Japan) Mima Ito	9	766
6	(China) Gu Yuting	5	756
7	(China) Chen Xingtong	6	725
8	(China) Zhu Yuling	5	713
9	(China) Ding Ning	2	625
10	(Singapore) Feng Tianwei	6	550
11	(Japan) Sakura Mori	10	438
12	(Germany) Shan Xiaona	6	399
13	(Japan) Hina Hayata	9	376
14=	(Japan) Miu Hirano	8	371
14=	(Germany) Han Ying	6	371
16	(Hong Kong) Doo Hoi Kem	7	329
17	(Japan) Hitomi Sato	10	288
18	(Chinese Taipei) Cheng I-ching	6	282
19=	(Japan) Miyu Kato	10	268
19=	(Japan) Honoka Hashimoto	10	268
21=	(China) Chen Ke	4	216
21=	(China) Gu Ruochen	2	216
23=	(China) Liu Shiwen	1	200
23=	(China) Feng Yalan	1	200
25	(South Korea) Jeon Ji-hee	7	199

Player met the qualification criteria for the Grand Finals and competed at the event
Player did not qualify for the Grand Finals, either due to not meeting the qualification criteria or not finishing in a high enough position

=== Doubles ===
Points were accumulated during the doubles tournaments at each of the twelve ITTF World Tour events. The eight men's pairs and eight women's pairs who played in at least four events and accumulated the largest number of points, as a pair, were invited to play in the Grand Finals in Astana in December.

Men's doubles – final standings

Rank	after all 12 events	Events	Points
1	(Japan) Jin Ueda / (Japan) Maharu Yoshimura	4	675
2	(Japan) Masataka Morizono / (Japan) Yuya Oshima	6	645
3	(Germany) Ruwen Filus / (Germany) Ricardo Walther	8	357
4	(South Korea) Jung Young-sik / (South Korea) Lee Sang-su	2	350
5	(Hong Kong) Ho Kwan Kit / (Hong Kong) Wong Chun Ting	6	345
6	(Germany) Patrick Franziska / (Denmark) Jonathan Groth	4	338
7	(Japan) Tomokazu Harimoto / (Japan) Yuto Kizukuri	4	332
8=	(South Korea) Jang Woo-jin / (South Korea) Park Gang-hyeon	2	319
8=	(Japan) Koki Niwa / (Japan) Jin Ueda	2	319
10	(China) Fan Zhendong / (China) Xu Xin	3	313
11	(China) Ma Long / (China) Xu Xin	1	300
12	(China) Fang Bo / (China) Zhou Yu	2	275
13	(Chinese Taipei) Chen Chien-an / (Chinese Taipei) Chiang Hung-chieh	4	239
14	(Sweden) Kristian Karlsson / (Sweden) Mattias Karlsson	4	226
15	(Belgium) Robin Devos / (Belgium) Cédric Nuytinck	7	207
16	(South Korea) Jang Woo-jin / (South Korea) Jeong Sang-eun	1	200
17	(Japan) Koki Niwa / (Japan) Maharu Yoshimura	3	182
18	(Singapore) Gao Ning / (Singapore) Pang Xue Jie	6	170
19	(Hong Kong) Jiang Tianyi / (Hong Kong) Lam Siu Hang	6	158
20=	(Brazil) Hugo Calderano / (Brazil) Gustavo Tsuboi	2	138
20=	(France) Tristan Flore / (France) Emmanuel Lebesson	3	138

Women's doubles – final standings

Rank	after all 12 events	Events	Points
1	(Japan) Hina Hayata / (Japan) Mima Ito	5	613
2	(China) Chen Xingtong / (China) Sun Yingsha	2	600
3	(China) Chen Meng / (China) Zhu Yuling	4	588
4	(Sweden) Matilda Ekholm / (Hungary) Georgina Póta	5	519
5	(South Korea) Jeon Ji-hee / (South Korea) Yang Ha-eun	6	488
6	(Hong Kong) Doo Hoi Kem / (Hong Kong) Lee Ho Ching	7	432
7	(Chinese Taipei) Chen Szu-yu / (Chinese Taipei) Cheng I-ching	5	363
8	(China) Chen Meng / (China) Wang Manyu	2	338
9	(Japan) Honoka Hashimoto / (Japan) Hitomi Sato	4	325
10=	(China) Ding Ning / (China) Liu Shiwen	1	300
10=	(Japan) Hina Hayata / (Japan) Miu Hirano	1	300
12	(Japan) Kasumi Ishikawa / (Japan) Mima Ito	2	219
13	(Slovakia) Barbora Balážová / (Czech Republic) Hana Matelová	7	201
14	(Germany) Shan Xiaona / (Germany) Petrissa Solja	1	200
15	(China) Chen Xingtong / (China) Wang Manyu	1	150
16	(Hong Kong) Ng Wing Nam / (Hong Kong) Soo Wai Yam Minnie	5	145
17	(Singapore) Lin Ye / (Singapore) Zhou Yihan	6	133
18	(Germany) Han Ying / (Germany) Shan Xiaona	5	127
19	(Singapore) Feng Tianwei / (Singapore) Yu Mengyu	3	95
20=	(Japan) Miyu Kato / (Japan) Miyu Nagasaki	2	88
20=	(China) Gu Yuting / (Hong Kong) Soo Wai Yam Minnie	2	88

Pair met the qualification criteria for the Grand Finals and competed at the event
Pair met the qualification criteria for the Grand Finals, but withdrew prior to the event
Pair did not qualify for the Grand Finals, either due to not meeting the qualification criteria or not finishing in a high enough position

== Grand Finals ==
The 2017 ITTF World Tour Grand Finals took place in Astana, Kazakhstan, from 14–17 December 2017.

== ITTF Challenge Series ==
In addition to the twelve ITTF World Tour events, eleven ITTF Challenge Series events also took place in 2017. These events were held in Belarus, Thailand, Chile, Slovenia, Croatia, Brazil, North Korea, Nigeria, Poland, Belgium and Spain. For the first time, the Challenge Series did not form part of the main ITTF World Tour.

== See also ==
- 2017 World Table Tennis Championships
- 2017 ITTF Men's World Cup
- 2017 ITTF Women's World Cup
- 2017 in table tennis
