= 2017 ITTF World Tour Grand Finals =

Table tennis tournament in Astana, Kazakhstan

Tournament details
- Dates: 14–17 December 2017
- Edition: 22nd
- Total prize money: US$1,000,000
- Venue: "Daulet" Sport Complex
- Location: Astana, Kazakhstan

Champions
- Men's singles: (China) Fan Zhendong
- Women's singles: (China) Chen Meng
- Men's doubles: (Japan) Masataka Morizono (Japan) Yuya Oshima
- Women's doubles: (China) Chen Meng (China) Zhu Yuling
- Official website: 2017 ITTF World Tour Grand Finals

The 2017 ITTF World Tour Grand Finals was the final competition of the 2017 ITTF World Tour, the International Table Tennis Federation's professional table tennis world tour. It was the 22nd edition of the competition, and was held from 14 to 17 December in Astana, Kazakhstan.

The competition featured events in four categories: men's singles, women's singles, men's doubles and women's doubles.

== Events ==
Event	Gold	Silver	Bronze
Men's Singles	(China) Fan Zhendong	(Germany) Dimitrij Ovtcharov	(China) Lin Gaoyuan
Men's Singles	(China) Fan Zhendong	(Germany) Dimitrij Ovtcharov	(Germany) Timo Boll
Women's Singles	(China) Chen Meng	(China) Zhu Yuling	(China) Gu Yuting
Women's Singles	(China) Chen Meng	(China) Zhu Yuling	(China) Chen Xingtong
Men's Doubles	(Japan) Masataka Morizono (Japan) Yuya Oshima	(Hong Kong) Ho Kwan Kit (Hong Kong) Wong Chun Ting	(Japan) Jin Ueda (Japan) Maharu Yoshimura
Men's Doubles	(Japan) Masataka Morizono (Japan) Yuya Oshima	(Hong Kong) Ho Kwan Kit (Hong Kong) Wong Chun Ting	(Chinese Taipei) Chen Chien-an (Chinese Taipei) Chiang Hung-chieh
Women's Doubles	(China) Chen Meng (China) Zhu Yuling	(Japan) Hina Hayata (Japan) Mima Ito	(Hong Kong) Doo Hoi Kem (Hong Kong) Lee Ho Ching
Women's Doubles	(China) Chen Meng (China) Zhu Yuling	(Japan) Hina Hayata (Japan) Mima Ito	(Japan) Honoka Hashimoto (Japan) Hitomi Sato

== Qualification ==
Players earned points based on their performances in the singles and doubles tournaments at the 12 events of the 2017 ITTF World Tour. The top 15 men's singles players, the top 16 women's singles players, and the top eight men's and women's doubles pairs who satisfied the qualification criteria were invited to compete. Kazakhstan's Kirill Gerassimenko was the 16th player added to the men's singles event to ensure that the host nation was represented.

== Tournament format ==
The singles and doubles tournaments consisted of knockout draws, with 16 players starting each of the singles events and eight pairs starting each of the doubles events. The seedings for the tournament draws were based on final tour standings, not the official ITTF world ranking.

== Men's singles ==
=== Players ===
1. (Germany) Dimitrij Ovtcharov (final)
2. (Germany) Timo Boll (semifinals)
3. (China) Fan Zhendong (champion)
4. (China) Lin Gaoyuan (semifinals)
5. (China) Xu Xin (quarterfinals)
6. (Japan) Tomokazu Harimoto (quarterfinals)
7. (France) Simon Gauzy (first round)
8. (Belarus) Vladimir Samsonov (first round)
9. (Japan) Kenta Matsudaira (first round)
10. (China) Fang Bo (quarterfinals)
11. (Japan) Koki Niwa (first round)
12. (Hong Kong) Wong Chun Ting (quarterfinals)
13. (Japan) Masaki Yoshida (first round)
14. (Japan) Yuya Oshima (first round)
15. (Chinese Taipei) Chuang Chih-yuan (first round)
16. (Kazakhstan) Kirill Gerassimenko (first round)

=== Draw ===
First round
1	(Germany) Dimitrij Ovtcharov	10	11	12	11	9	11	11
11	(Japan) Koki Niwa	12	6	14	6	11	9	5
16	(Kazakhstan) Kirill Gerassimenko	9	6	5	11
6	(Japan) Tomokazu Harimoto	11	11	11	13
7	(France) Simon Gauzy	6	8	8	7
10	(China) Fang Bo	11	11	11	11
13	(Japan) Masaki Yoshida	4	1	6	7
4	(China) Lin Gaoyuan	11	11	11	11
3	(China) Fan Zhendong	17	8	12	8	11	11
15	(Chinese Taipei) Chuang Chih-yuan	15	11	10	11	5	6
9	(Japan) Kenta Matsudaira	6	8	9	8
5	(China) Xu Xin	11	11	11	11
8	(Belarus) Vladimir Samsonov	3	10	11	11	11	11	9
12	(Hong Kong) Wong Chun Ting	11	12	9	13	4	8	11
14	(Japan) Yuya Oshima	6	11	11	10	8	6
2	(Germany) Timo Boll	11	8	3	12	11	11

Quarterfinals
1	(Germany) D. Ovtcharov	11	11	11	12	11	5	11
6	(Japan) T. Harimoto	7	13	8	14	8	11	7
10	(China) Fang Bo	11	7	6	7	6
4	(China) Lin Gaoyuan	8	11	11	11	11
3	(China) Fan Zhendong	11	11	9	11	12
5	(China) Xu Xin	6	8	11	9	10
12	(Hong Kong) Wong C.T.	11	8	11	3	9	3
2	(Germany) Timo Boll	4	11	9	11	11	11

Semifinals
1	(Germany) D. Ovtcharov	7	6	11	11	11	4	12
4	(China) Lin Gaoyuan	11	11	9	8	8	11	10
3	(China) Fan Zhendong	11	11	8	11	9	11
2	(Germany) Timo Boll	6	4	11	8	11	7

Final
1	(Germany) D. Ovtcharov	7	9	7	10
3	(China) Fan Zhendong	11	11	11	12

== Women's singles ==
=== Players ===
1. (China) Chen Meng (champion)
2. (China) Wang Manyu (quarterfinals)
3. (Japan) Kasumi Ishikawa (quarterfinals)
4. (Japan) Mima Ito (quarterfinals)
5. (China) Gu Yuting (semifinals)
6. (China) Chen Xingtong (semifinals)
7. (China) Zhu Yuling (final)
8. (Singapore) Feng Tianwei (quarterfinals)
9. (Japan) Sakura Mori (first round)
10. (Germany) Shan Xiaona (first round)
11. (Japan) Hina Hayata (first round)
12. (Japan) Miu Hirano (first round)
13. (Germany) Han Ying (first round)
14. (Hong Kong) Doo Hoi Kem (first round)
15. (Japan) Hitomi Sato (first round)
16. (Chinese Taipei) Cheng I-ching (first round)

=== Draw ===
First round
1	(China) Chen Meng	11	11	11	8	9	11
14	(Hong Kong) Doo Hoi Kem	5	8	6	11	11	8
16	(Chinese Taipei) Cheng I-ching	9	11	15	5	8
8	(Singapore) Feng Tianwei	11	7	17	11	11
5	(China) Gu Yuting	11	11	10	11	9	12	11
12	(Japan) Miu Hirano	5	6	12	8	11	14	9
13	(Germany) Han Ying	3	9	11	12	6	4
3	(Japan) Kasumi Ishikawa	11	11	9	10	11	11
4	(Japan) Mima Ito	11	11	11	8	5	11
9	(Japan) Sakura Mori	8	8	7	11	11	5
10	(Germany) Shan Xiaona	2	6	10	11	10
6	(China) Chen Xingtong	11	11	12	5	12
7	(China) Zhu Yuling	9	4	11	11	11	9	11
11	(Japan) Hina Hayata	11	11	8	8	5	11	7
15	(Japan) Hitomi Sato	6	6	7	11	10
2	(China) Wang Manyu	11	11	11	8	12

Quarterfinals
1	(China) Chen Meng	11	11	11	11
8	(Singapore) Feng Tianwei	4	8	6	3
5	(China) Gu Yuting	6	11	11	11	6	11
3	(Japan) K. Ishikawa	11	9	8	6	11	4
4	(Japan) Mima Ito	8	11	6	8	6
6	(China) Chen Xingtong	11	8	11	11	11
7	(China) Zhu Yuling	11	8	11	6	11	9	11
2	(China) Wang Manyu	6	11	7	11	8	11	2

Semifinals
1	(China) Chen Meng	12	11	11	11
5	(China) Gu Yuting	10	4	5	9
6	(China) Chen Xingtong	11	6	4	14	7
7	(China) Zhu Yuling	9	11	11	16	11

Final
1	(China) Chen Meng	11	11	11	12
7	(China) Zhu Yuling	6	3	6	10

== Men's doubles ==
=== Players ===
1. (Japan) Jin Ueda / (Japan) Maharu Yoshimura (semifinals)
2. (Japan) Masataka Morizono / (Japan) Yuya Oshima (champions)
3. (Hong Kong) Ho Kwan Kit / (Hong Kong) Wong Chun Ting (final)
4. (Germany) Patrick Franziska / (Denmark) Jonathan Groth (quarterfinals)
5. (Japan) Tomokazu Harimoto / (Japan) Yuto Kizukuri (quarterfinals)
6. (Chinese Taipei) Chen Chien-an / (Chinese Taipei) Chiang Hung-chieh (semifinals)
7. (Belgium) Robin Devos / (Belgium) Cédric Nuytinck (quarterfinals)
8. (Singapore) Gao Ning / (Singapore) Pang Xue Jie (quarterfinals)

=== Draw ===
Quarterfinals
1	(Japan) Ueda / Yoshimura	11	11	11
7	(Belgium) Devos / Nuytinck	9	6	7
8	(Singapore) Gao / Pang	4	2	11
3	(Hong Kong) Ho / Wong	11	11	13
4	(Germany) Franziska / (Denmark) Groth	7	7	11	9
6	(Chinese Taipei) Chen / Chiang	11	11	3	11
5	(Japan) Harimoto / Kizukuri	11	9	10	11	8
2	(Japan) Morizono / Oshima	8	11	12	8	11

Semifinals
1	(Japan) Ueda / Yoshimura	11	3	11	11	11	10	9
3	(Hong Kong) Ho / Wong	4	11	13	3	7	12	11
6	(Chinese Taipei) Chen / Chiang	5	7	12	14	8	5
2	(Japan) Morizono / Oshima	11	11	10	12	11	11

Final
3	(Hong Kong) Ho / Wong	7	11	11	10	11	10	10
2	(Japan) Morizono / Oshima	11	6	6	12	9	12	12

== Women's doubles ==
=== Players ===
1. (Japan) Hina Hayata / (Japan) Mima Ito (final)
2. (China) Chen Meng / (China) Zhu Yuling (champions)
3. (Sweden) Matilda Ekholm / (Hungary) Georgina Póta (quarterfinals)
4. (Hong Kong) Doo Hoi Kem / (Hong Kong) Lee Ho Ching (semifinals)
5. (Chinese Taipei) Chen Szu-yu / (Chinese Taipei) Cheng I-ching (quarterfinals)
6. (Japan) Honoka Hashimoto / (Japan) Hitomi Sato (semifinals)
7. (Slovakia) Barbora Balážová / (Czech Republic) Hana Matelová (quarterfinals)
8. (Hong Kong) Ng Wing Nam / (Hong Kong) Soo Wai Yam Minnie (quarterfinals)

=== Draw ===
Quarterfinals
1	(Japan) Hayata / Ito	11	11	11	11
7	(Slovakia) Balážová / (Czech Republic) Matelová	9	6	13	5
5	(Chinese Taipei) Chen / Cheng	8	7	11	11
4	(Hong Kong) Doo / Lee	11	11	4	13
3	(Sweden) Ekholm / (Hungary) Póta	6	9	11	7
6	(Japan) Hashimoto / Sato	11	11	8	11
8	(Hong Kong) Ng / Soo	3	4	7
2	(China) Chen / Zhu	11	11	11

Semifinals
1	(Japan) Hayata / Ito	8	11	9	12	11	16
4	(Hong Kong) Doo / Lee	11	6	11	10	9	14
6	(Japan) Hashimoto / Sato	12	4	9	8
2	(China) Chen / Zhu	14	11	11	11

Final
1	(Japan) Hayata / Ito	8	8	8	9
2	(China) Chen / Zhu	11	11	11	11

== ITTF Star Awards ==
The 2017 ITTF Star Awards ceremony was held on the first evening of the Grand Finals at the Rixos President Hotel on 14 December.

Awards were handed out in eight categories:

- Male Table Tennis Star: (Germany) Timo Boll
- Female Table Tennis Star: (China) Ding Ning
- Male Para Table Tennis Star: (Ukraine) Viktor Didukh
- Female Para Table Tennis Star: (Turkey) Neslihan Kavas
- Table Tennis Star Coach: (Germany) Jörg Roßkopf
- Table Tennis Breakthrough Star: (Japan) Tomokazu Harimoto
- Table Tennis Star Point: (China) Ding Ning (versus Zhu Yuling at the 2017 World Championships)
- Fair Play Star: (France) Irvin Bertrand

== See also ==
- 2017 World Table Tennis Championships
- 2017 ITTF Men's World Cup
- 2017 ITTF Women's World Cup
