= 2017 ITTF Women's World Cup =

- Venue: Pan Am Centre
- Location: Markham, Ontario, Canada
- Date: 27–29 October
- Competitors: 20 from 16 nations
- Total prize money: $150,000

Medalists
gold medal	(China) Zhu Yuling
silver medal	(China) Liu Shiwen
bronze medal	(Chinese Taipei) Cheng I-ching

The 2017 ITTF Women's World Cup was a table tennis competition held in Markham, Ontario, from 27 to 29 October 2017. It was the 21st edition of the ITTF-sanctioned event, and the first time that it had been staged in Canada.

In the final, China's Zhu Yuling defeated fellow Chinese player Liu Shiwen, 4–3, to win her first World Cup title.

== Qualification ==
The following list of players was confirmed on 2 October 2017, based on the qualification system set by the ITTF.

No.	World Ranking (August 2017)	Player	Qualified as
1	4	(China) Liu Shiwen	~~World Champion~~ Substitute
2	118	(Egypt) Dina Meshref	Africa Cup winner
3	3	(China) Zhu Yuling	Asian Cup winner
4	73	(United States) Lily Zhang	PanAm Cup winner
5	232	(Chile) Paulina Vega	PanAm Cup Latin American qualifier
6	106	(Australia) Jian Fang Lay	Oceania Cup winner
7	19	(Netherlands) Li Jie	Europe Top 16 winner
8	7	(Japan) Kasumi Ishikawa	Asian Cup 3rd place
9	5	(Japan) Miu Hirano	Asian Cup 4th place
10	35	(Sweden) Matilda Ekholm	~~Europe Top 16 2nd place~~ Substitute
11	49	(Germany) Sabine Winter	Europe Top 16 3rd place
12	22	(Austria) Liu Jia	Continental Cup qualifier
13	32	(Hungary) Georgina Póta	Continental Cup qualifier
14	40	(Chinese Taipei) Chen Szu-yu	Continental Cup qualifier
15	29	(South Korea) Seo Hyo-won	Continental Cup qualifier
16	31	(Hong Kong) Doo Hoi Kem	Continental Cup qualifier
17	8	(Chinese Taipei) Cheng I-ching	Continental Cup qualifier
18	36	(Hong Kong) Lee Ho Ching	Continental Cup qualifier
19	56	(Canada) Zhang Mo	Host nation representative
20	27	(Romania) Elizabeta Samara	Wild card

== Competition format ==
The tournament consisted of two stages: a preliminary group stage and a knockout stage. The players seeded 9 to 20 were drawn into four groups, with three players in each group. The top two players from each group then joined the top eight seeded players in the second stage of the competition, which consisted of a knockout draw.

== Seeding ==
The seeding list was based on the official ITTF world ranking for October 2017.

1. (China) Zhu Yuling (champion)
2. (China) Liu Shiwen (final)
3. (Japan) Kasumi Ishikawa (first round)
4. (Japan) Miu Hirano (semifinals)
5. (Chinese Taipei) Cheng I-ching (semifinals)
6. (Hong Kong) Doo Hoi Kem (first round)
7. (Netherlands) Li Jie (quarterfinals)
8. (Romania) Elizabeta Samara (quarterfinals)
9. (South Korea) Seo Hyo-won (first round)
10. (Hungary) Georgina Póta (first round)
11. (Chinese Taipei) Chen Szu-yu (quarterfinals)
12. (Austria) Liu Jia (first round)
13. (Hong Kong) Lee Ho Ching (quarterfinals)
14. (Sweden) Matilda Ekholm (first round)
15. (Germany) Sabine Winter (preliminary round)
16. (Canada) Zhang Mo (first round)
17. (United States) Lily Zhang (preliminary round)
18. (Egypt) Dina Meshref (first round)
19. (Australia) Jian Fang Lay (preliminary round)
20. (Chile) Paulina Vega (preliminary round)

== Preliminary stage ==
The preliminary group stage took place on 27 October, with the top two players in each group progressing to the main draw.

	Group A	(South Korea) Seo	(Canada) Zhang	(United States) Zhang	Points
9	(South Korea) Seo Hyo-won		4–0	4–1	4
16	(Canada) Zhang Mo	0–4		4–3	3
17	(United States) Lily Zhang	1–4	3–4		2

	Group B	(Hungary) Póta	(Sweden) Ekholm	(Australia) Lay	Points
10	(Hungary) Georgina Póta		4–2	4–1	4
14	(Sweden) Matilda Ekholm	2–4		4–0	3
19	(Australia) Jian Fang Lay	1–4	0–4		2

	Group C	(Chinese Taipei) Chen	(Hong Kong) Lee	(Chile) Vega	Points
11	(Chinese Taipei) Chen Szu-yu		4–0	4–0	4
13	(Hong Kong) Lee Ho Ching	0–4		4–0	3
20	(Chile) Paulina Vega	0–4	0–4		2

	Group D	(Austria) Liu	(Egypt) Meshref	(Germany) Winter	Points
12	(Austria) Liu Jia		4–0	4–0	4
18	(Egypt) Dina Meshref	0–4		4–0	3
15	(Germany) Sabine Winter	0–4	0–4		2

== Main draw ==
The knockout stage took place from 28–29 October.

First round
1	(China) Zhu Yuling	6	11	11	14	11
16	(Canada) Zhang Mo	11	8	8	12	2
12	(Austria) Liu Jia	9	9	11	8	11	12	5
7	(Netherlands) Li Jie	11	11	4	11	4	10	11
5	(Chinese Taipei) Cheng I-ching	7	7	11	13	11	7	11
10	(Hungary) Georgina Póta	11	11	8	11	7	11	4
13	(Hong Kong) Lee Ho Ching	11	4	11	1	8	11	11
3	(Japan) Kasumi Ishikawa	4	11	7	11	11	9	6
4	(Japan) Miu Hirano	5	11	11	11	11
14	(Sweden) Matilda Ekholm	11	6	9	4	2
11	(Chinese Taipei) Chen Szu-yu	5	4	10	11	18	12	11
6	(Hong Kong) Doo Hoi Kem	11	11	12	8	16	10	8
8	(Romania) Elizabeta Samara	11	4	11	11	11
9	(South Korea) Seo Hyo-won	6	11	8	7	2
18	(Egypt) Dina Meshref	5	6	6	2
2	(China) Liu Shiwen	11	11	11	11

Quarterfinals
1	(China) Zhu Yuling	11	6	11	11	11
7	(Netherlands) Li Jie	3	11	9	3	5
5	(Chinese Taipei) Cheng I-ching	6	13	6	11	11	11
13	(Hong Kong) Lee Ho Ching	11	11	11	7	8	5
4	(Japan) Miu Hirano	11	11	11	11
(Chinese Taipei) Chen Szu-yu	7	6	6	8
8	(Romania) Elizabeta Samara	4	6	7	4
2	(China) Liu Shiwen	11	11	11	11

Semifinals
1	(China) Zhu Yuling	11	11	11	11
5	(Chinese Taipei) Cheng I-ching	4	9	3	4
4	(Japan) Miu Hirano	5	7	1	6
2	(China) Liu Shiwen	11	11	11	11

Final
1	(China) Zhu Yuling	11	8	11	11	10	11	12
2	(China) Liu Shiwen	13	11	7	8	12	9	10
Third place
5	(Chinese Taipei) Cheng I-ching	9	11	9	11	11	11
4	(Japan) Miu Hirano	11	5	11	9	5	8

== See also ==
- 2017 World Table Tennis Championships
- 2017 ITTF Men's World Cup
- 2017 ITTF World Tour
- 2017 ITTF World Tour Grand Finals
