= 2017 World Table Tennis Championships =

- Date: 29 May – 5 June
- Edition: 54th
- Location: Düsseldorf, Germany
- Venue: Messe Düsseldorf

Champions

Men's singles
- (China) Ma Long

Women's singles
- (China) Ding Ning

Men's doubles
- (China) Fan Zhendong / (China) Xu Xin

Women's doubles
- (China) Ding Ning / (China) Liu Shiwen

Mixed doubles
- (Japan) Maharu Yoshimura / (Japan) Kasumi Ishikawa
← 2015 ·	World Table Tennis Championships	· 2019 →

The 2017 World Table Tennis Championships were held in Düsseldorf, Germany, from 29 May to 5 June 2017. The decision to host the event in Düsseldorf was announced by the ITTF in April 2015. They were the 54th edition of the competition, and the seventh time that it has been staged in Germany.

== Schedule ==
Five events were contested, with qualification rounds taking place from 29 to 30 May.

Rounds in main draw
Finals

Date	30 May	31 May	1 June	2 June	3 June	4 June	5 June
Men's singles		R1	R2	R3	R4	R4, QF	SF, F
Women's singles		R1, R2	R3	R4, QF	SF	F	
Men's doubles	R1	R2	R3	QF	SF	F	
Women's doubles	R1	R2	R3	QF			SF, F
Mixed doubles	R1, R2		R3, QF		SF, F		

== Medal summary ==
=== Medal table ===
Rank	Nation	Gold	Silver	Bronze	Total
1	China (CHN)	4	3	2.5	9.5
2	Japan (JPN)	1	1	3	5
3	Chinese Taipei (TPE)	0	1	0	1
4	South Korea (KOR)	0	0	2	2
5	Hong Kong (HKG)	0	0	1	1
5	Singapore (SIN)	0	0	1	1
7	Germany (GER)	0	0	0.5	0.5
Totals (7 entries)		5	5	10	20

=== Events ===
Event	Gold	Silver	Bronze
Men's singles	(China) Ma Long	(China) Fan Zhendong	(China) Xu Xin
Men's singles	(China) Ma Long	(China) Fan Zhendong	(South Korea) Lee Sang-su
Women's singles	(China) Ding Ning	(China) Zhu Yuling	(Japan) Miu Hirano
Women's singles	(China) Ding Ning	(China) Zhu Yuling	(China) Liu Shiwen
Men's doubles	(China) Fan Zhendong (China) Xu Xin	(Japan) Masataka Morizono (Japan) Yuya Oshima	(South Korea) Jung Young-sik (South Korea) Lee Sang-su
Men's doubles	(China) Fan Zhendong (China) Xu Xin	(Japan) Masataka Morizono (Japan) Yuya Oshima	(Japan) Koki Niwa (Japan) Maharu Yoshimura
Women's doubles	(China) Ding Ning (China) Liu Shiwen	(China) Chen Meng (China) Zhu Yuling	(Singapore) Feng Tianwei (Singapore) Yu Mengyu
Women's doubles	(China) Ding Ning (China) Liu Shiwen	(China) Chen Meng (China) Zhu Yuling	(Japan) Hina Hayata (Japan) Mima Ito
Mixed doubles	(Japan) Maharu Yoshimura (Japan) Kasumi Ishikawa	(Chinese Taipei) Chen Chien-an (Chinese Taipei) Cheng I-ching	(China) Fang Bo (Germany) Petrissa Solja
Mixed doubles	(Japan) Maharu Yoshimura (Japan) Kasumi Ishikawa	(Chinese Taipei) Chen Chien-an (Chinese Taipei) Cheng I-ching	(Hong Kong) Wong Chun Ting (Hong Kong) Doo Hoi Kem

== See also ==
- 2017 ITTF Men's World Cup
- 2017 ITTF Women's World Cup
- 2017 ITTF World Tour
- 2017 ITTF World Tour Grand Finals
