= 2017 World Table Tennis Championships – Women's singles =

Women's singles at the 2017 World Table Tennis Championships
- Venue: Messe Düsseldorf
- Location: Düsseldorf, Germany
- Dates: 29 May – 4 June
- Final score: 11–4, 9–11, 4–11, 12–10, 11–6, 11–7

Medalists
gold medal	Ding Ning	China
silver medal	Zhu Yuling	China
bronze medal	Miu Hirano	Japan
bronze medal	Liu Shiwen	China

Ding Ning successfully defended their title by defeating Zhu Yuling 11–4, 9–11, 4–11, 12–10, 11–6, 11–7 in the final.

== Seeds ==
Matches were best of 7 games in qualification and in the 128-player sized main draw.

1. (China) Ding Ning (champion)
2. (China) Liu Shiwen (semifinals)
3. (China) Zhu Yuling (final)
4. (Singapore) Feng Tianwei (quarterfinals)
5. (China) Chen Meng (quarterfinals)
6. (Japan) Kasumi Ishikawa (quarterfinals)
7. (Chinese Taipei) Cheng I-ching (second round)
8. (Japan) Miu Hirano (semifinals)
9. (Japan) Mima Ito (fourth round)
10. (Japan) Hitomi Sato (third round)
11. (Hong Kong) Doo Hoi Kem (second round)
12. (Austria) Liu Jia (third round)
13. (Germany) Petrissa Solja (second round)
14. (Netherlands) Li Jie (fourth round)
15. (Singapore) Yu Mengyu (second round)
16. (South Korea) Yang Ha-eun (third round)
17. (North Korea) Kim Song-i (fourth round)
18. (Sweden) Matilda Ekholm (first round)
19. (Hungary) Georgina Póta (second round)
20. (South Korea) Seo Hyo-won (third round)
21. (Romania) Elizabeta Samara (fourth round)
22. (Japan) Miyu Kato (fourth round)
23. (Hong Kong) Lee Ho Ching (third round)
24. (Poland) Li Qian (third round)
25. (Germany) Sabine Winter (second round)
26. (Chinese Taipei) Chen Szu-yu (third round)
27. (South Korea) Kim Kyungah (third round)
28. (Romania) Daniela Dodean (fourth round)
29. (Hong Kong) Soo Wai Yam Minnie (third round)
30. (Russia) Polina Mikhailova (second round)
31. (Austria) Sofia Polcanova (second round)
32. (Ukraine) Tetyana Sorochynska (second round)
33. (Hong Kong) Ng Wing Nam (second round)
34. (Belarus) Viktoria Pavlovich (second round)
35. (Romania) Bernadette Szőcs (second round)
36. (Thailand) Suthasini Sawettabut (second round)
37. (Germany) Kristin Silbereisen (fourth round)
38. (Luxembourg) Ni Xialian (third round)
39. (Poland) Natalia Partyka (second round)
40. (Netherlands) Britt Eerland (second round)
41. (Canada) Zhang Mo (third round)
42. (Poland) Katarzyna Grzybowska (first round)
43. (North Korea) Ri Mi-gyong (second round)
44. (Thailand) Nanthana Komwong (second round)
45. (Puerto Rico) Adriana Díaz (second round)
46. (Chinese Taipei) Cheng Hsien-tzu (second round)
47. (Romania) Adina Diaconu (second round)
48. (Czech Republic) Hana Matelová (first round)
49. (Russia) Yana Noskova (second round)
50. (South Korea) Lee Zi-on (third round)
51. (United States) Lily Zhang (third round)
52. (Hungary) Dóra Madarász (second round)
53. (Ukraine) Ganna Gaponova (first round)
54. (Hong Kong) Mak Tze Wing (first round)
55. (Hungary) Szandra Pergel (third round)
56. (Spain) María Xiao (fourth round)
57. (Australia) Jian Fang Lay (second round)
58. (India) Manika Batra (second round)
59. (Spain) Galia Dvorak (second round)
60. (Romania) Irina Ciobanu (first round)
61. (Slovakia) Eva Ódorová (second round)
62. (South Korea) Yoo Eun-chong (second round)
63. (Lithuania) Rūta Paškauskienė (second round)
64. (Luxembourg) Sarah De Nutte (second round)

== Draw ==
=== Key ===
- Q = Qualifier
- w/o = Walkover
- w/d = Withdraw
- r = Retired
- DQ = Disqualified

=== Finals ===
Quarterfinals
1	(China) Ding Ning	11	11	7	11	11
6	(Japan) Kasumi Ishikawa	8	2	11	8	2
8	(Japan) Miu Hirano	11	11	18	11
4	(Singapore) Feng Tianwei	5	2	16	5
3	(China) Zhu Yuling	17	8	11	10	11	11
5	(China) Chen Meng	15	11	9	12	7	4
(China) Mu Zi	11	6	8	3	7
2	(China) Liu Shiwen	1	11	11	11	11

Semifinals
1	(China) Ding Ning	11	11	11	5	11
8	(Japan) Miu Hirano	4	8	5	11	5
3	(China) Zhu Yuling	10	11	7	11	8	11	11
2	(China) Liu Shiwen	12	9	11	8	11	9	5

Final
1	(China) Ding Ning	11	9	4	12	11	11
3	(China) Zhu Yuling	4	11	11	10	6	7

=== Top half ===
==== Section 1 ====
First round
1	(China) Ding	11	11	11	11
(Belarus) Trigolos	4	2	3	4
(Czech Republic) Adámková	11	12	7	9	11	12
60	(Romania) Ciobanu	5	10	11	11	9	10
38	(Luxembourg) Ni	11	11	11	11
(Colombia) Medina	6	4	2	3
(Sweden) Bergström	8	8	3	5
19	(Hungary) Póta	11	11	11	11
25	(Germany) Winter	11	11	8	11	12
(Croatia) Jeger	8	5	11	2	10
(Vietnam) Mai	5	8	8	4
51	(United States) Zhang	11	11	11	11
61	(Slovakia) Ódorová	11	7	11	11	11
(Spain) Ramirez	7	11	6	9	4
(Slovakia) Kukulkova	7	4	6	2
14	(Netherlands) Li J.	11	11	11	11

Second round
1	(China) Ding	11	11	11	11
(Czech Republic) Adámková	5	3	7	5
38	(Luxembourg) Ni	12	10	11	11	11
19	(Hungary) Póta	10	12	9	4	8
25	(Germany) Winter	11	11	7	10	11	6	6
51	(United States) Zhang	7	4	11	12	7	11	11
61	(Slovakia) Ódorová	7	9	7	13	7
14	(Netherlands) Li J.	11	11	11	11	11

Third round
1	(China) Ding	11	11	11	11
38	(Luxembourg) Ni	8	9	6	3
51	(United States) Zhang	13	11	4	4	9
14	(Netherlands) Li J.	15	5	11	11	11

Fourth round
1	(China) Ding	11	11	11	11
14	(Netherlands) Li J.	9	6	6	9

==== Section 2 ====
First round
10	(Japan) Sato	11	11	11	11
(India) Mukherjee	4	5	4	3
(Egypt) Abdel Razek	6	4	8	6
46	(Chinese Taipei) Cheng H.	11	11	11	11
54	(Hong Kong) Mak	5	8	10	4
(Thailand) Khetkhuan	11	11	12	11
(Belgium) Lung	6	5	7	11	12
21	(Romania) Samara	11	11	11	9	14
30	(Russia) Mikhailova	11	12	11	12
(Thailand) Paranang	6	10	4	10
(North Korea) Ri	11	11	11	11
42	(Poland) Grzybowska	7	6	5	6
49	(Russia) Noskova	9	11	11	11	12
(Slovenia) Galić	11	9	9	6	10
(Brazil) Kumahara	2	7	2	8
6	(Japan) Ishikawa	11	11	11	11

Second round
10	(Japan) Sato	11	11	11	11
46	(Chinese Taipei) Cheng H.	5	4	6	6
(Thailand) Khetkhuan	10	4	2	11	5
21	(Romania) Samara	12	11	11	9	11
30	(Russia) Mikhailova	10	10	14	12	13	9	7
(North Korea) Ri	12	12	12	10	11	11	11
49	(Russia) Noskova	3	6	3	4
6	(Japan) Ishikawa	11	11	11	11

Third round
10	(Japan) Sato	11	11	7	8	11	8	8
21	(Romania) Samara	5	8	11	11	4	11	11
(North Korea) Ri	10	11	7	5	6
6	(Japan) Ishikawa	12	7	11	11	11

Fourth round
21	(Romania) Samara	6	7	7	8
6	(Japan) Ishikawa	11	11	11	11

==== Section 3 ====
First round
8	(Japan) Hirano	11	11	11	11
(Nigeria) Oshonaike	8	2	4	1
(Italy) Piccolin	8	6	9	9
36	(Thailand) Sawettabut	11	11	11	11
47	(Romania) Diaconu	11	7	8	15	11	11
(Germany) Mantz	6	11	11	13	9	3
(Chile) Low	5	1	4	5
26	(Chinese Taipei) Chen	11	11	11	11
31	(Austria) Polcanova	11	12	11	11
(Slovenia) Fajmut	4	10	8	6
(Serbia) Todorović	2	7	5	7
41	(Canada) Zhang	11	11	11	11
56	(Spain) Xiao	11	11	11	11
(Germany) Mittelham	4	9	8	9
(Belarus) Arlouskaya	6	2	3	8
11	(Hong Kong) Doo	11	11	11	11

Second round
8	(Japan) Hirano	11	11	11	13
36	(Thailand) Sawettabut	5	3	8	11
47	(Romania) Diaconu	7	5	9	7
26	(Chinese Taipei) Chen	11	11	11	11
31	(Austria) Polcanova	8	11	13	9	11
41	(Canada) Zhang	11	13	11	11	13
56	(Spain) Xiao	11	4	4	12	1	12	11
11	(Hong Kong) Doo	9	11	11	10	11	10	7

Third round
8	(Japan) Hirano	11	8	12	11	11
26	(Chinese Taipei) Chen	8	11	10	7	5
41	(Canada) Zhang	11	8	7	6	5
56	(Spain) Xiao	7	11	11	11	11

Fourth round
8	(Japan) Hirano	11	11	11	11
56	(Spain) Xiao	4	1	4	3

==== Section 4 ====
First round
15	(Singapore) Yu	11	11	11	11
(Switzerland) Moret	5	8	4	1
(Wales) Carey	5	7	11	7	8
37	(Germany) Silbereisen	11	11	7	11	11
50	(South Korea) Lee Z.	11	11	8	12	9	8	11
(Serbia) Lupulesku	4	7	11	10	11	11	7
(Switzerland) Aschwanden	6	6	9	6
32	(Ukraine) Sorochynska	11	11	11	11
23	(Hong Kong) Lee H.	11	11	11	11
(Belgium) Marchetti	6	7	5	3
(France) Chasselin	12	3	4	8	7
39	(Poland) Partyka	10	11	11	11	11
44	(Thailand) Komwong	15	14	11	11
(Czech Republic) Tomanovska	13	12	6	9
(Russia) Vorobeva	5	4	7	3
4	(Singapore) Feng	11	11	11	11

Second round
15	(Singapore) Yu	7	11	7	9	11	8
37	(Germany) Silbereisen	11	8	11	11	7	11
50	(South Korea) Lee Z.	12	4	11	10	11	11
32	(Ukraine) Sorochynska	10	11	4	12	9	2
23	(Hong Kong) Lee H.	11	6	11	13	16	11
39	(Poland) Partyka	7	11	6	11	18	4
44	(Thailand) Komwong	5	4	8	5
4	(Singapore) Feng	11	11	11	11

Third round
37	(Germany) Silbereisen	8	11	11	11	7	11
50	(South Korea) Lee Z.	11	5	6	7	11	8
23	(Hong Kong) Lee H.	11	6	6	6	11	8
4	(Singapore) Feng	8	11	11	11	8	11

Fourth round
37	(Germany) Silbereisen	11	5	7	11	7	9
4	(Singapore) Feng	8	11	11	9	11	11

=== Bottom half ===
==== Section 5 ====
First round
3	(China) Zhu	11	11	11	11
(Estonia) Petrova	3	5	3	2
(Chinese Taipei) Huang	11	8	5	13	11	7	8
64	(Luxembourg) De Nutte	8	11	11	11	8	11	11
58	(India) Batra	11	11	11	11
(Poland) Kusińska	8	6	3	5
(Ukraine) Brateyko	4	7	9	6
27	(South Korea) Kim K.	11	11	11	11
29	(Hong Kong) Soo	11	11	12	7	11	11
(Hungary) Ambrus	7	5	10	11	13	6
(Greece) Toliou	10	5	5	9
34	(Belarus) Pavlovich	12	11	11	11
40	(Netherlands) Eerland	11	11	27	11	7	11
(Croatia) Srebrnjak	5	5	29	8	11	3
(Brazil) Lin G.	11	12	8	11	11	8	6
9	(Japan) Ito	13	10	11	9	6	11	11

Second round
3	(China) Zhu	11	11	11	11
64	(Luxembourg) De Nutte	2	6	3	6
58	(India) Batra	11	5	6	6	8
27	(South Korea) Kim K.	3	11	11	11	11
29	(Hong Kong) Soo	8	11	11	10	11	11
34	(Belarus) Pavlovich	11	9	9	12	5	7
40	(Netherlands) Eerland	10	10	11	4	11
9	(Japan) Ito	12	12	9	11	13

Third round
3	(China) Zhu	11	12	11	11
27	(South Korea) Kim K.	4	10	3	8
29	(Hong Kong) Soo	6	2	8	9
9	(Japan) Ito	11	11	11	11

Fourth round
3	(China) Zhu	11	8	11	6	11	11
9	(Japan) Ito	9	11	1	11	7	5

==== Section 6 ====
First round
12	(Austria) Liu J.	11	11	10	11	11
(India) Das	7	7	12	7	5
(Chinese Taipei) Liu Y.	11	11	6	8	11	7	6
35	(Romania) Szőcs	9	9	11	11	3	11	11
45	(Puerto Rico) Díaz	11	11	11	11
(Portugal) Oliveira	9	8	6	6
(United States) Wang C.	7	12	6	6	6
28	(Romania) Dodean	11	10	11	11	11
18	(Sweden) Ekholm	13	11	10	11	11
(Czech Republic) Cechova	15	5	12	13	13
(Germany) Wan Y.	6	12	6	7	9
59	(Spain) Dvorak	11	10	11	11	11
57	(Australia) Lay	11	11	11	11
(India) Patkar	8	6	5	7
(Russia) Tailakova	3	4	2	2
5	(China) Chen	11	11	11	11

Second round
12	(Austria) Liu J.	11	11	9	11	11
35	(Romania) Szőcs	7	9	11	8	8
45	(Puerto Rico) Díaz	9	5	11	8	7
28	(Romania) Dodean	11	11	6	11	11
(Czech Republic) Cechova	7	9	11	11	11	11
59	(Spain) Dvorak	11	11	7	7	9	9
57	(Australia) Lay	7	11	3	5	5
5	(China) Chen	11	9	11	11	11

Third round
12	(Austria) Liu J.	3	11	8	11	9
28	(Romania) Dodean	11	13	11	8	11
(Czech Republic) Cechova	2	6	7	8
5	(China) Chen	11	11	11	11

Fourth round
28	(Romania) Dodean	7	2	7	11	8
5	(China) Chen	11	11	11	3	11

==== Section 7 ====
First round
7	(Chinese Taipei) Cheng	11	11	11	11
(Egypt) Meshref	6	7	9	2
(China) Mu Z.	11	11	11	11
53	(Ukraine) Gaponova	7	9	7	1
62	(South Korea) Yoo	11	11	11	11
(Brazil) Takahashi	1	9	7	3
(Lithuania) Stuckytė	3	5	6	13
24	(Poland) Li Q.	11	11	11	15
22	(Japan) Kato	11	11	11	11
(Spain) Zhang X.	3	5	7	1
(Sweden) Kallberg	5	7	6	11	5
33	(Hong Kong) Ng	11	11	11	6	11
43	(North Korea) Ri	11	11	13	11
(France) Gasnier	7	8	11	9
(Uzbekistan) Gufranova	3	3	4	10
16	(South Korea) Yang	11	11	11	12

Second round
7	(Chinese Taipei) Cheng	5	5	13	7	12	7
(China) Mu Z.	11	11	11	11	10	11
62	(South Korea) Yoo	11	1	4	7	4
24	(Poland) Li Q.	5	11	11	11	11
22	(Japan) Kato	11	11	8	15	9	11
33	(Hong Kong) Ng	8	5	11	13	11	6
43	(North Korea) Ri	5	9	9	11	9
16	(South Korea) Yang	11	11	11	3	11

Third round
(China) Mu Z.	w/o
24	(Poland) Li Q.	w/d
22	(Japan) Kato	11	8	12	10	13	5	11
16	(South Korea) Yang	7	11	10	12	11	11	4

Fourth round
(China) Mu Z.	11	11	11	11
22	(Japan) Kato	7	3	9	3

==== Section 8 ====
First round
13	(Germany) Solja	11	11	11	8	11
(United States) Wu Y.	5	8	7	11	3
(United States) Guan	11	12	6	6	7
55	(Hungary) Pergel	9	14	11	11	11
52	(Hungary) Madarász	11	11	11	11
(Azerbaijan) Zhou	3	5	8	3
(Serbia) Vignjević	10	7	7	9
17	(North Korea) Kim S.	12	11	11	11
20	(South Korea) Seo	4	11	11	11	11
(Iran) Ashtari	11	4	6	2	4
(France) Loeuillette	9	14	11	6	11	12
48	(Czech Republic) Matelová	11	12	9	11	5	10
63	(Lithuania) Paškauskienė	11	9	11	11	11
(Netherlands) Vermaas	4	11	5	6	8
(Estonia) Avameri	2	2	3	5
2	(China) Liu S.	11	11	11	11

Second round
13	(Germany) Solja	11	9	7	3	7
55	(Hungary) Pergel	4	11	11	11	11
52	(Hungary) Madarász	11	5	9	3	11
17	(North Korea) Kim S.	8	11	11	11	13
20	(South Korea) Seo	12	11	12	11
(France) Loeuillette	10	9	10	8
63	(Lithuania) Paškauskienė	5	6	5	5
2	(China) Liu S.	11	11	11	11

Third round
55	(Hungary) Pergel	5	1	4	8
17	(North Korea) Kim S.	11	11	11	11
20	(South Korea) Seo	9	4	7	6
2	(China) Liu S.	11	11	11	11

Fourth round
17	(North Korea) Kim S.	6	5	3	9
2	(China) Liu S.	11	11	11	11
