= 2017 World Table Tennis Championships – Women's doubles =

Women's doubles at the 2017 World Table Tennis Championships
- Venue: Messe Düsseldorf
- Location: Düsseldorf, Germany
- Dates: 29 May – 5 June
- Final score: 9–11, 11–8, 11–13, 11–8, 11–6, 6–11, 11–9

Medalists
| gold medal | Ding Ning; Liu Shiwen | China |
| silver medal | Chen Meng; Zhu Yuling | China |
| bronze medal | Feng Tianwei; Yu Mengyu | Singapore |
| bronze medal | Hina Hayata; Mima Ito | Japan |

The 2017 World Table Tennis Championships women's doubles was the 53rd edition of the women's doubles championship. Liu Shiwen and Zhu Yuling were the defending champions but decided not to play together this year.

Ding Ning and Liu defeated Chen Meng and Zhu 9–11, 11–8, 11–13, 11–8, 11–6, 6–11, 11–9 in the final.

== Seeds ==
Matches were best of 5 games in qualification and best of 7 games in the 64-player sized main draw.

1. (Sweden) Matilda Ekholm / (Hungary) Georgina Póta (first round)
2. (Hong Kong) Doo Hoi Kem / (Hong Kong) Lee Ho Ching (quarterfinals)
3. (China) Chen Meng / (China) Zhu Yuling (final)
4. (China) Ding Ning / (China) Liu Shiwen (champions)
5. (South Korea) Lee Zi-on / (South Korea) Yang Ha-eun (first round)
6. (Chinese Taipei) Chen Szu-yu / (Chinese Taipei) Cheng I-ching (quarterfinals)
7. (Netherlands) Li Jie / (Poland) Li Qian (third round)
8. (Japan) Hina Hayata / (Japan) Mima Ito (semifinals)
9. (Russia) Polina Mikhailova / (Russia) Olga Vorobeva (first round)
10. (Germany) Petrissa Solja / (Germany) Sabine Winter (third round)
11. (Singapore) Feng Tianwei / (Singapore) Yu Mengyu (semifinals)
12. (Hungary) Dóra Madarász / (Hungary) Szandra Pergel (third round)
13. (India) Manika Batra / (India) Mouma Das (quarterfinals)
14. (Poland) Katarzyna Grzybowska / (Poland) Natalia Partyka (second round)
15. (Germany) Chantal Mantz / (Germany) Wan Yuan (second round)
16. (Germany) Nina Mittelham / (Germany) Kristin Silbereisen (second round)
17. (Hong Kong) Ng Wing Nam / (Hong Kong) Soo Wai Yam Minnie (third round)
18. (Russia) Yana Noskova / (Russia) Mariia Tailakova (second round)
19. (Egypt) Yousra Abdel Razek / (Egypt) Dina Meshref (second round)
20. (Slovenia) Alex Galič / (Switzerland) Rachel Moret (third round)
21. (Puerto Rico) Adriana Díaz / (Puerto Rico) Melanie Díaz (first round)
22. (Romania) Daniela Dodean / (Romania) Elizabeta Samara (second round)
23. (Chile) Katherine Low / (Chile) Paulina Vega (first round)
24. (Luxembourg) Sarah De Nutte / (Luxembourg) Ni Xialian (second round)
25. (Chinese Taipei) Cheng Hsien-tzu / (Chinese Taipei) Huang Yu-wen (second round)
26. (Czech Republic) Hana Matelová / (Czech Republic) Kateřina Tomanovska (second round)
27. (Japan) Miu Hirano / (Japan) Kasumi Ishikawa (third round)
28. (South Korea) Kim Kyungah / (South Korea) Suh Hyo-won (second round)
29. (Romania) Adina Diaconu / (Romania) Bernadette Szőcs (second round)
30. (Cameroon) Sarah Hanffou / (Nigeria) Olufunke Oshonaike (first round)
31. (Spain) Galia Dvorak / (Spain) María Xiao (second round)
32. (Thailand) Tamolwan Khetkhuan / (Thailand) Nanthana Komwong (second round)

== Draw ==
=== Key ===
- Q = Qualifier
- w/o = Walkover
- w/d = Withdraw
- r = Retired
- DQ = Disqualified

=== Finals ===
| Semifinals | | | | | | | Final |
| 11 | (Singapore) Feng Tianwei (Singapore) Yu Mengyu | 6 | 6 | 11 | 8 | 7 |
| 3 | (China) Chen Meng (China) Zhu Yuling | 11 | 11 | 6 | 11 | 11 | 3 | (China) Chen Meng (China) Zhu Yuling | 11 | 8 | 13 | 8 | 6 | 11 | 9 |
| 4 | (China) Ding Ning (China) Liu Shiwen | 14 | 11 | 11 | 6 | 11 | 4 | (China) Ding Ning (China) Liu Shiwen | 9 | 11 | 11 | 11 | 11 | 6 | 11 |
| 8 | (Japan) Hina Hayata (Japan) Mima Ito | 12 | 9 | 6 | 11 | 3 |

=== Top half ===
==== Section 1 ====
First round
1 | (Sweden) Ekholm (Hungary) Póta | 11 | 7 | 9 | 11 | 8 | 11
(Ukraine) Sorochynska (Belarus) Pavlovich | 4 | 11 | 11 | 8 | 11 | 13
(France) Chasselin (France) Loeuillette | 8 | 10 | 9 | 9
20 | (Slovenia) Galič (Switzerland) Moret | 11 | 12 | 11 | 11
32 | (Thailand) Khetkhuan (Thailand) Komwong | 10 | 11 | 11 | 12 | 8 | 12 | 11
(Belarus) Bogdanova (Belarus) Trigolos | 12 | 9 | 1 | 10 | 11 | 14 | 9
(Sweden) Bergström (Sweden) Kallberg | 9 | 5 | 5 | 8
11 | (Singapore) Feng (Singapore) Yu | 11 | 11 | 11 | 11
14 | (Poland) Grzybowska (Poland) Partyka | 11 | 11 | 11 | 11
(Venezuela) Cardozo (Venezuela) Niño | 4 | 3 | 3 | 5
(Estonia) Avameri (Austria) Mischek | 5 | 10 | 6 | 3
17 | (Hong Kong) Ng (Hong Kong) Soo | 11 | 12 | 11 | 11
30 | (Cameroon) Hanffou (Nigeria) Oshonaike | 3 | 6 | 4 | 5
(Lithuania) Paškauskienė (Lithuania) Stuckytė | 11 | 11 | 11 | 11
(Egypt) Abdel-Aziz (Lebanon) Bsaibes | 4 | 3 | 3 | 4
6 | (Chinese Taipei) Chen (Chinese Taipei) Cheng I. | 11 | 11 | 11 | 11

Second round
(Ukraine) Sorochynska (Belarus) Pavlovich | 10 | 11 | 11 | 4 | 11 | 7 | 12
20 | (Slovenia) Galič (Switzerland) Moret | 12 | 8 | 8 | 11 | 6 | 11 | 14
32 | (Thailand) Khetkhuan (Thailand) Komwong | 11 | 6 | 11 | 2 | 6 | 9
11 | (Singapore) Feng (Singapore) Yu | 2 | 11 | 6 | 11 | 11 | 11
14 | (Poland) Grzybowska (Poland) Partyka | 7 | 11 | 6 | 3 | 5
17 | (Hong Kong) Ng (Hong Kong) Soo | 11 | 6 | 11 | 11 | 11
(Lithuania) Paškauskienė (Lithuania) Stuckytė | 7 | 11 | 4 | 11 | 8 | 10
6 | (Chinese Taipei) Chen (Chinese Taipei) Cheng I. | 11 | 9 | 11 | 9 | 11 | 12

Third round
20 | (Slovenia) Galič (Switzerland) Moret | 7 | 10 | 11 | 7 | 5
11 | (Singapore) Feng (Singapore) Yu | 11 | 12 | 7 | 11 | 11
17 | (Hong Kong) Ng (Hong Kong) Soo | 11 | 8 | 5 | 9 | 11 | 6
6 | (Chinese Taipei) Chen (Chinese Taipei) Cheng I. | 4 | 11 | 11 | 11 | 7 | 11

Quarterfinals
11 | (Singapore) Feng (Singapore) Yu | 11 | 6 | 11 | 12 | 8 | 11
6 | (Chinese Taipei) Chen (Chinese Taipei) Cheng I. | 9 | 11 | 9 | 10 | 11 | 8

==== Section 2 ====
First round
5 | (South Korea) Lee Z. (South Korea) Yang | 3 | 4 | 11 | 7 | 11
(United States) Wu (United States) Zhang | 11 | 11 | 8 | 11 | 13
(Australia) Lay (Australia) Tan | 0 | 0 | 0 | 0
26 | (Czech Republic) Matelová (Czech Republic) Tomanovska | 11 | 11 | 11 | 11
23 | (Chile) Low (Chile) Vega | 3 | 12 | 6 | 6 | 10
(Austria) Polcanova (Canada) Zhang M. | 11 | 10 | 11 | 11 | 12
(Italy) Colantoni (Italy) Vivarelli | 7 | 12 | 11 | 9 | 7
16 | (Germany) Mittelham (Germany) Silbereisen | 11 | 14 | 9 | 11 | 11
12 | (Hungary) Madarász (Hungary) Pergel | 12 | 8 | 14 | 11 | 5 | 11
(Czech Republic) Adámková (Slovakia) Kukuľková | 10 | 11 | 12 | 2 | 11 | 2
(Argentina) Codina (Argentina) Kaizoji | 6 | 7 | 10 | 8
31 | (Spain) Dvorak (Spain) Xiao | 11 | 11 | 12 | 11
29 | (Romania) Diaconu (Romania) Szőcs | 11 | 11 | 11 | 11
(Argentina) Fukuhara (Argentina) Molero | 4 | 3 | 8 | 7
(Nigeria) Akpan (Nigeria) Edem | 0 | 0 | 0 | 0
3 | (China) Chen (China) Zhu | 11 | 11 | 11 | 11

Second round
(United States) Wu (United States) Zhang | 11 | 10 | 11 | 8 | 11 | 11
26 | (Czech Republic) Matelová (Czech Republic) Tomanovska | 9 | 12 | 5 | 11 | 2 | 7
(Austria) Polcanova (Canada) Zhang M. | 8 | 11 | 11 | 6 | 11 | 11
16 | (Germany) Mittelham (Germany) Silbereisen | 11 | 9 | 5 | 11 | 4 | 9
12 | (Hungary) Madarász (Hungary) Pergel | 13 | 11 | 11 | 13 | 11 | 11
31 | (Spain) Dvorak (Spain) Xiao | 15 | 9 | 7 | 15 | 8 | 7
29 | (Romania) Diaconu (Romania) Szőcs | 6 | 5 | 7 | 6
3 | (China) Chen (China) Zhu | 11 | 11 | 11 | 11

Third round
(United States) Wu (United States) Zhang | 13 | 6 | 11 | 11 | 17
(Austria) Polcanova (Canada) Zhang M. | 11 | 11 | 9 | 9 | 15
12 | (Hungary) Madarász (Hungary) Pergel | 5 | 6 | 7 | 4
3 | (China) Chen (China) Zhu | 11 | 11 | 11 | 11

Quarterfinals
(United States) Wu (United States) Zhang | 14 | 6 | 9 | 5 | 7
3 | (China) Chen (China) Zhu | 12 | 11 | 11 | 11 | 11

=== Bottom half ===
==== Section 3 ====
First round
4 | (China) Ding (China) Liu | 11 | 11 | 11 | 11
(Brazil) Lin (Brazil) Takahashi | 7 | 5 | 3 | 2
(Indonesia) Dwijayanti (Indonesia) Indriani | 11 | 11 | 10 | 13 | 11 | 11
21 | (Puerto Rico) A. Díaz (Puerto Rico) M. Díaz | 7 | 3 | 12 | 15 | 7 | 9
27 | (Japan) Hirano (Japan) Ishikawa | 9 | 11 | 11 | 3 | 11 | 11
(Thailand) Paranang (Thailand) Sawettabut | 11 | 7 | 8 | 11 | 8 | 6
(Spain) Ramìrez (Spain) Zhang X. | 7 | 11 | 9 | 8 | 11 | 11 | 8
15 | (Germany) Mantz (Germany) Wan | 11 | 9 | 11 | 11 | 3 | 8 | 11
13 | (India) Batra (India) Das | 11 | 10 | 11 | 11 | 11
(Norway) Doval (Norway) Gjelle | 7 | 12 | 6 | 4 | 7
(Turkey) Kulakçeken (Turkey) Yılmaz | 11 | 7 | 5 | 11 | 12 | 8 | 7
18 | (Russia) Noskova (Russia) Tailakova | 8 | 11 | 11 | 8 | 10 | 11 | 11
25 | (Chinese Taipei) Cheng H. (Chinese Taipei) Huang | 11 | 11 | 11 | 11
(Ukraine) Brateyko (Ukraine) Motsyk | 9 | 9 | 6 | 5
(Serbia) Lupulesku (Serbia) Todorović | 7 | 8 | 10 | 7
7 | (Netherlands) Li J. (Poland) Li Q. | 11 | 11 | 12 | 11

Second round
4 | (China) Ding (China) Liu | 11 | 11 | 11 | 11
(Indonesia) Dwijayanti (Indonesia) Indriani | 6 | 5 | 4 | 5
27 | (Japan) Hirano (Japan) Ishikawa | 11 | 11 | 11 | 11
15 | (Germany) Mantz (Germany) Wan | 6 | 8 | 3 | 5
13 | (India) Batra (India) Das | 14 | 10 | 11 | 11 | 4 | 11 | 11
18 | (Russia) Noskova (Russia) Tailakova | 16 | 12 | 7 | 8 | 11 | 5 | 9
25 | (Chinese Taipei) Cheng H. (Chinese Taipei) Huang | 4 | 6 | 10 | 6
7 | (Netherlands) Li J. (Poland) Li Q. | 11 | 11 | 11 | 11

Third round
4 | (China) Ding (China) Liu | 12 | 11 | 11 | 11
27 | (Japan) Hirano (Japan) Ishikawa | 10 | 9 | 3 | 4
13 | (India) Batra (India) Das | 11 | 11 | 11 | 11
7 | (Netherlands) Li J. (Poland) Li Q. | 0 | 0 | 0 | 0

Quarterfinals
4 | (China) Ding (China) Liu | 11 | 11 | 11 | 11
13 | (India) Batra (India) Das | 7 | 7 | 1 | 3

==== Section 4 ====
First round
8 | (Japan) Hayata (Japan) Ito | 11 | 12 | 11 | 11
(Switzerland) Aschwanden (Brazil) Kumahara | 7 | 10 | 6 | 8
(Croatia) Durak (Croatia) Jeger | 7 | 2 | 14 | 9 | 12
28 | (South Korea) Kim (South Korea) Suh | 11 | 11 | 12 | 11 | 14
22 | (Romania) Dodean (Romania) Samara | 11 | 17 | 10 | 11 | 11
(India) Mukherjee (India) Patkar | 5 | 15 | 12 | 5 | 4
(North Korea) Ri H. (North Korea) Ri M. | 11 | 11 | 11 | 11
9 | (Russia) Mikhailova (Russia) Vorobeva | 8 | 4 | 3 | 9
10 | (Germany) Solja (Germany) Winter | 13 | 11 | 14 | 11
(Iran) Ashtari (Iran) Safari | 11 | 1 | 12 | 6
(Iran) Samet (Iran) Shahsavari | 11 | 8 | 4 | 6 | 10
24 | (Luxembourg) De Nutte (Luxembourg) Ni | 9 | 11 | 11 | 11 | 12
19 | (Egypt) Abdel Razek (Egypt) Meshref | 11 | 11 | 11 | 11
(Tunisia) Garci (Tunisia) Saidani | 5 | 6 | 5 | 6
(Belgium) Degraef (Belgium) Lung | 7 | 7 | 5 | 3
2 | (Hong Kong) Doo (Hong Kong) Lee H. | 11 | 11 | 11 | 11

Second round
8 | (Japan) Hayata (Japan) Ito | 5 | 11 | 11 | 10 | 11 | 11
28 | (South Korea) Kim (South Korea) Suh | 11 | 4 | 4 | 12 | 9 | 9
22 | (Romania) Dodean (Romania) Samara | 6 | 11 | 11 | 10 | 5 | 15 | 10
(North Korea) Ri H. (North Korea) Ri M. | 11 | 4 | 6 | 12 | 11 | 13 | 12
10 | (Germany) Solja (Germany) Winter | 13 | 12 | 11 | 11 | 9 | 11 | 11
24 | (Luxembourg) De Nutte (Luxembourg) Ni | 15 | 14 | 7 | 8 | 11 | 9 | 4
19 | (Egypt) Abdel Razek (Egypt) Meshref | 4 | 4 | 11 | 2 | 2
2 | (Hong Kong) Doo (Hong Kong) Lee H. | 11 | 11 | 9 | 11 | 11

Third round
8 | (Japan) Hayata (Japan) Ito | 7 | 11 | 11 | 13 | 11
(North Korea) Ri H. (North Korea) Ri M. | 11 | 9 | 6 | 11 | 6
10 | (Germany) Solja (Germany) Winter | 9 | 7 | 8 | 7
2 | (Hong Kong) Doo (Hong Kong) Lee H. | 11 | 11 | 11 | 11

Quarterfinals
8 | (Japan) Hayata (Japan) Ito | 12 | 11 | 11 | 11
2 | (Hong Kong) Doo (Hong Kong) Lee H. | 10 | 8 | 4 | 6
