= Table tennis at the 2014 Asian Games – Women's doubles =

Women's doubles at the 2014 Asian Games
- Venue: Suwon Gymnasium
- Dates: 29 September – 3 October 2014
- Competitors: 62 from 18 nations

Medalists
gold medal	Zhu Yuling; Chen Meng	China
silver medal	Liu Shiwen; Wu Yang	China
bronze medal	Kim Jong; Kim Hye-song	North Korea
bronze medal	Lee Ho Ching; Ng Wing Nam	Hong Kong

The women's doubles table tennis event was part of the table tennis programme and took place between September 29 and October 3, at the Suwon Gymnasium.

== Schedule ==
All times are Korea Standard Time (UTC+09:00)

Date	Time	Event
Monday, 29 September 2014	12:30	1st round
Wednesday, 1 October 2014	16:00	2nd round
Thursday, 2 October 2014	14:00	Quarterfinals
Friday, 3 October 2014	12:00	Semifinals
Friday, 3 October 2014	19:00	Final

== Results ==
=== Finals ===
Semifinals							Final
1	Liu Shiwen (CHN); Wu Yang (CHN)	11	7	11	11	11
13	Kim Jong (PRK); Kim Hye-song (PRK)	5	11	9	8	4	1	Liu Shiwen (CHN); Wu Yang (CHN)	10	6	11	11	3	10
4	Lee Ho Ching (HKG); Ng Wing Nam (HKG)	11	9	5	4	4	2	Zhu Yuling (CHN); Chen Meng (CHN)	12	11	8	8	11	12
2	Zhu Yuling (CHN); Chen Meng (CHN)	4	11	11	11	11

=== Top half ===
==== Section 1 ====
1st round
Menwah Al-Shammari (KUW); Fajir Mohammad (KUW)	2	8	8
10	Lin Ye (SIN); Zhou Yihan (SIN)	11	11	11
15	Poulomi Ghatak (IND); Ankita Das (IND)	11	11	11
Rahila Kashif (PAK); Shabnam Bilal (PAK)	5	1	7
Tam Sut Fei (MAC); U Sio Mei (MAC)	2	4	1
8	Park Young-sook (KOR); Yang Ha-eun (KOR)	11	11	11

2nd round
1	Liu Shiwen (CHN); Wu Yang (CHN)	12	11	12
10	Lin Ye (SIN); Zhou Yihan (SIN)	10	4	10
15	Poulomi Ghatak (IND); Ankita Das (IND)	6	6	3
8	Park Young-sook (KOR); Yang Ha-eun (KOR)	11	11	11

Quarterfinals
1	Liu Shiwen (CHN); Wu Yang (CHN)	11	11	11
8	Park Young-sook (KOR); Yang Ha-eun (KOR)	6	7	8

==== Section 2 ====
1st round
7	Doo Hoi Kem (HKG); Tie Ya Na (HKG)	11	11	11
Rita Maiya Prajapati (NEP); Rabina Maharjan (NEP)	8	5	3
Mueena Mohamed (MDV); Fathimath Jumana Nimal (MDV)	3	5	5
13	Kim Jong (PRK); Kim Hye-song (PRK)	11	11	11
12	Cheng I-ching (TPE); Huang Yi-hua (TPE)	11	11	11
Barkhasyn Enkhjin (MGL); Bat-Ölziin Sodbolor (MGL)	2	6	4
Aya Majdi (QAT); Maha Faramarzi (QAT)	4	2	2
3	Kasumi Ishikawa (JPN); Sayaka Hirano (JPN)	11	11	11

2nd round
7	Doo Hoi Kem (HKG); Tie Ya Na (HKG)	9	6	11	7
13	Kim Jong (PRK); Kim Hye-song (PRK)	11	11	5	11
12	Cheng I-ching (TPE); Huang Yi-hua (TPE)	9	10	8
3	Kasumi Ishikawa (JPN); Sayaka Hirano (JPN)	11	12	11

Quarterfinals
13	Kim Jong (PRK); Kim Hye-song (PRK)	3	11	8	12	11
3	Kasumi Ishikawa (JPN); Sayaka Hirano (JPN)	11	8	11	10	9

=== Bottom half ===
==== Section 3 ====
1st round
4	Lee Ho Ching (HKG); Ng Wing Nam (HKG)	11	12	12
Ho Ying (MAS); Lee Rou You (MAS)	4	10	10
Cheong Cheng I (MAC); Ma Chao In (MAC)	6	3	6
14	Nanthana Komwong (THA); Suthasini Sawettabut (THA)	11	11	11
11	Jeon Ji-hee (KOR); Lee Eun-hee (KOR)	11	11	11
Kajol Rauniyar (NEP); Nabita Shrestha (NEP)	3	4	7
Ri Myong-sun (PRK); Kim Song-i (PRK)	11	11	11
6	Feng Tianwei (SIN); Isabelle Li (SIN)	6	5	8

2nd round
4	Lee Ho Ching (HKG); Ng Wing Nam (HKG)	11	11	12
14	Nanthana Komwong (THA); Suthasini Sawettabut (THA)	9	9	10
11	Jeon Ji-hee (KOR); Lee Eun-hee (KOR)	6	11	13	11
Ri Myong-sun (PRK); Kim Song-i (PRK)	11	5	11	7

Quarterfinals
4	Lee Ho Ching (HKG); Ng Wing Nam (HKG)	11	11	6	11
11	Jeon Ji-hee (KOR); Lee Eun-hee (KOR)	5	4	11	9

==== Section 4 ====
1st round
5	Ai Fukuhara (JPN); Misako Wakamiya (JPN)	11	11	11
Noor Salem (KUW); Maryam Sulaiman (KUW)	5	1	9
Kholoud Abdulreda (QAT); Noora Al-Abri (QAT)	5	8	2
9	Chen Szu-yu (TPE); Lee I-chen (TPE)	11	11	11
16	Madhurika Patkar (IND); Neha Aggarwal (IND)	11	11	11
Aishath Nisa (MDV); Aminath Shiura Shareef (MDV)	3	6	2
Thiphakone Southamavong (LAO); Sengdavieng Douangpanya (LAO)	4	8	5
2	Zhu Yuling (CHN); Chen Meng (CHN)	11	11	11

2nd round
5	Ai Fukuhara (JPN); Misako Wakamiya (JPN)	6	6	11	11	11
9	Chen Szu-yu (TPE); Lee I-chen (TPE)	11	11	8	9	6
16	Madhurika Patkar (IND); Neha Aggarwal (IND)	2	7	6
2	Zhu Yuling (CHN); Chen Meng (CHN)	11	11	11

Quarterfinals
5	Ai Fukuhara (JPN); Misako Wakamiya (JPN)	5	3	14
2	Zhu Yuling (CHN); Chen Meng (CHN)	11	11	16
