= Ding Ning =

Chinese table tennis player

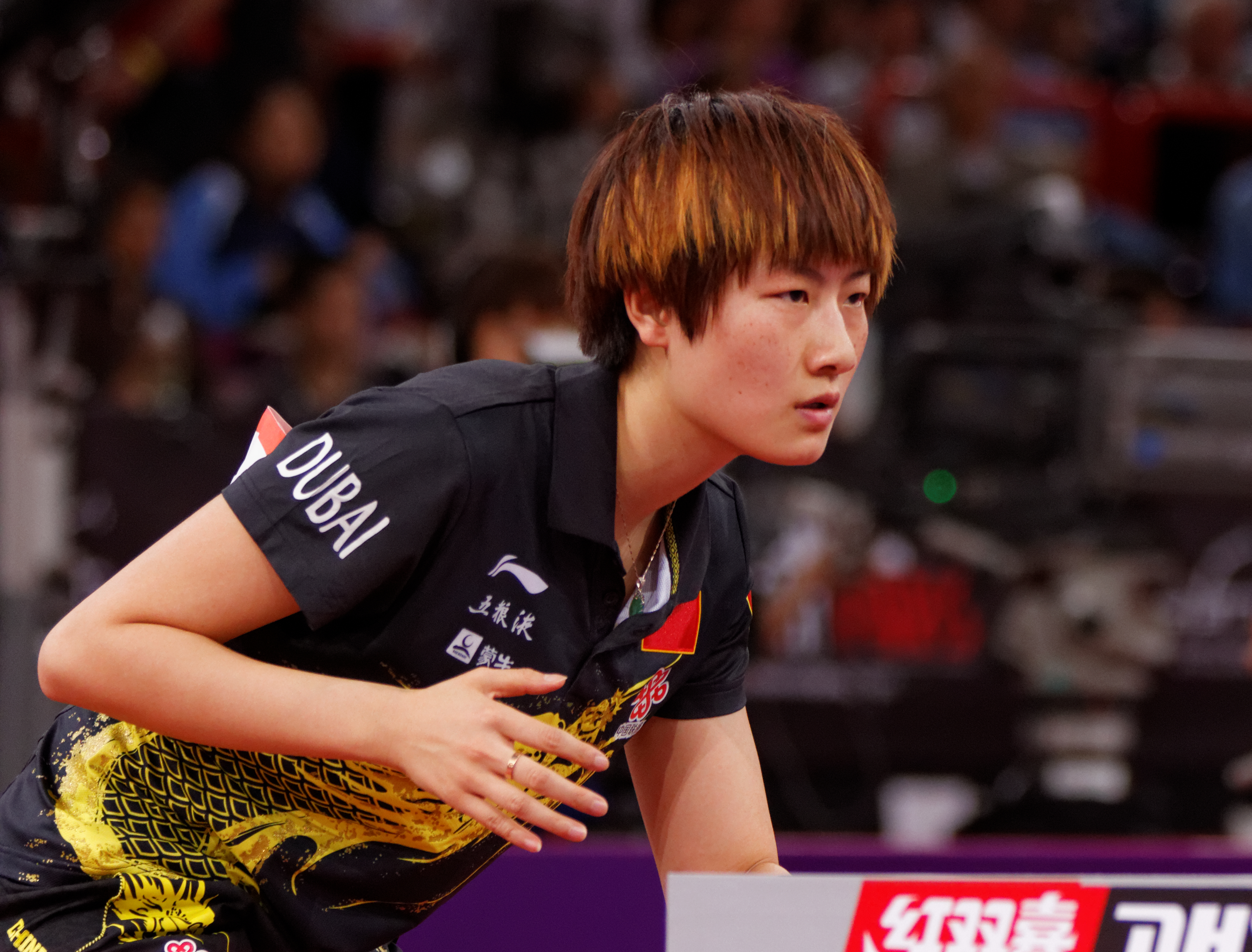
- Ding Ning in 2013

Personal information
- Nickname: The Queen of Hearts
- Nationality: Chinese
- Born: 20 June 1990 (age 36) Daqing, Heilongjiang, China
- Height: 1.71 m (5 ft 7 in)
- Weight: 63 kg (139 lb)

Sport
- Sport: Table tennis
- Playing style: Left-handed, shakehand grip
- Highest ranking: 1 (March 2019)
Medal record
Women's Table Tennis
Representing China
| Event | 1st | 2nd | 3rd |
|---|---|---|---|
| Olympic Games | 3 | 1 | 0 |
| World Championships | 8 | 5 | 3 |
| World Cup | 10 | 0 | 0 |
| Total | 21 | 6 | 3 |
Olympic Games
| Gold medal – first place | 2012 London | Team |
| Gold medal – first place | 2016 Rio de Janeiro | Singles |
| Gold medal – first place | 2016 Rio de Janeiro | Team |
| Silver medal – second place | 2012 London | Singles |
World Championships
| Gold medal – first place | 2011 Rotterdam | Singles |
| Gold medal – first place | 2012 Dortmund | Team |
| Gold medal – first place | 2014 Tokyo | Team |
| Gold medal – first place | 2015 Suzhou | Singles |
| Gold medal – first place | 2016 Kuala Lumpur | Team |
| Gold medal – first place | 2017 Düsseldorf | Singles |
| Gold medal – first place | 2017 Düsseldorf | Doubles |
| Gold medal – first place | 2018 Halmstad | Team |
| Silver medal – second place | 2009 Yokohama | Doubles |
| Silver medal – second place | 2010 Moscow | Team |
| Silver medal – second place | 2011 Rotterdam | Doubles |
| Silver medal – second place | 2013 Paris | Doubles |
| Silver medal – second place | 2015 Suzhou | Doubles |
| Bronze medal – third place | 2013 Paris | Singles |
| Bronze medal – third place | 2019 Budapest | Singles |
| Bronze medal – third place | 2019 Budapest | Mixed doubles |
World Cup
| Gold medal – first place | 2009 Linz | Team |
| Gold medal – first place | 2010 Dubai | Team |
| Gold medal – first place | 2011 Singapore | Singles |
| Gold medal – first place | 2011 Magdeburg | Team |
| Gold medal – first place | 2013 Guangzhou | Team |
| Gold medal – first place | 2014 Linz | Singles |
| Gold medal – first place | 2015 Dubai | Team |
| Gold medal – first place | 2018 London | Team |
| Gold medal – first place | 2018 Chengdu | Singles |
| Gold medal – first place | 2019 Tokyo | Team |

Ding Ning (Chinese: 丁宁; pinyin: Dīng Níng; born 20 June 1990) is a former Chinese table tennis player. She is the 2016 Olympic Champion in women's singles and was the winner of women's singles in the 2011 World Table Tennis Championships.

At the 2015 World Table Tennis Championships, Ding won her second world title in women's singles by defeating her compatriot Liu Shiwen 4–3 in the final. At the 2017 World Table Tennis Championships in Düsseldorf Ding defeated Zhu Yuling 4–2 in the final, becoming World Champion for the third time. She won the women's table tennis singles gold medal at the 2016 Summer Olympics where she beat compatriot Li Xiaoxia in the women's singles final. She previously won the silver medal at the 2012 Summer Olympics in the women's singles event in which she also faced Li Xiaoxia but lost after receiving several penalty points from the umpire. She was part of the Chinese team that won the gold medal in the team event at the 2012 and 2016 Olympics. She is one of the most successful female table tennis players (alongside Li Xiaoxia, Deng Yaping, Wang Nan, Zhang Yining) having won the gold medal in each of the Table Tennis World Cup, the Table Tennis World Championships, and the Olympic Games.

She is currently retired, and studying in Peking University for a master's degree in Physical Education. Ding officially announced her retirement in September 2021.

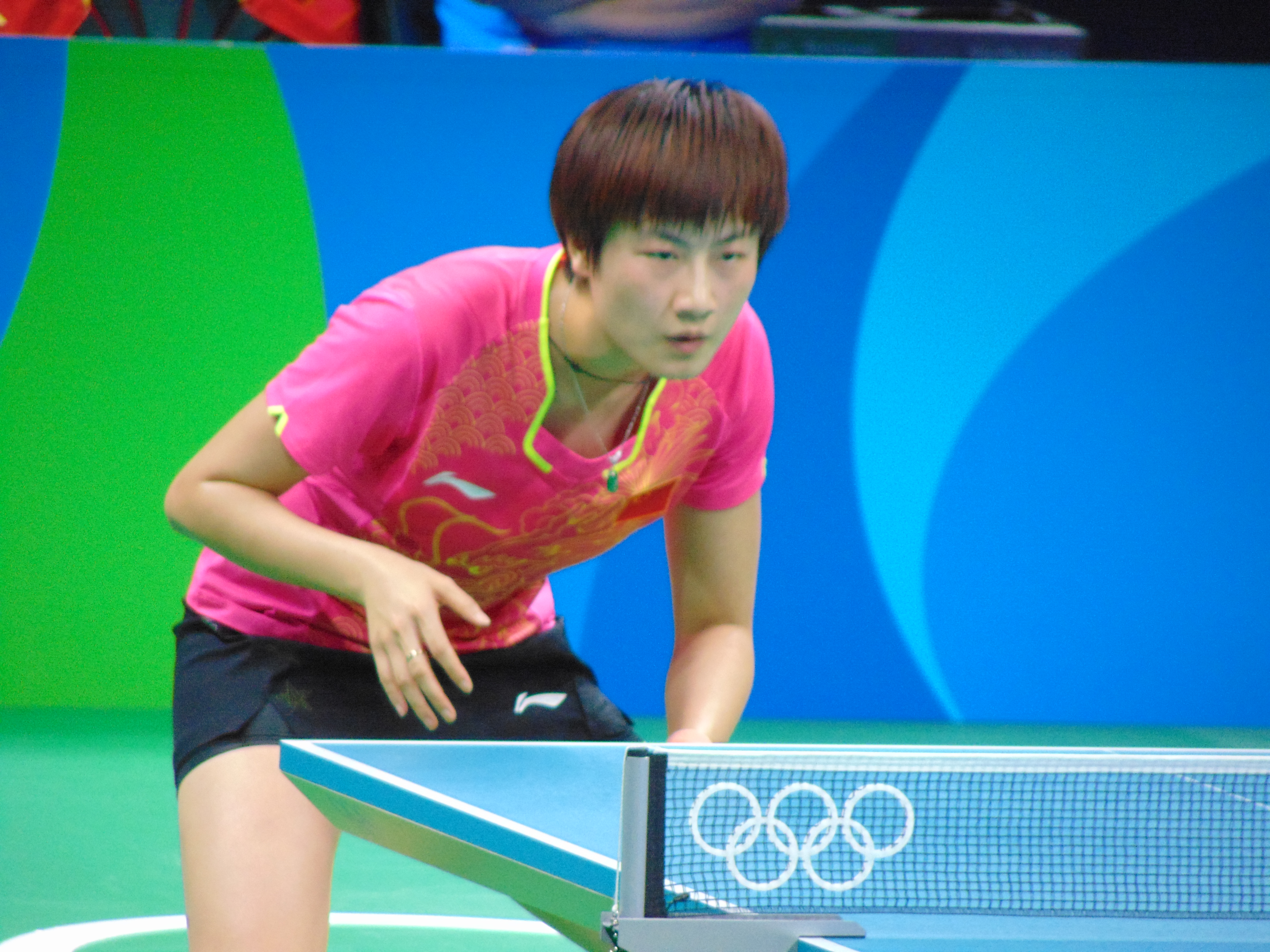
Ding Ning at the 2016 Summer Olympics

== Career records ==
Singles (as of 2016)

- World Championships: Winner (2011, 2015, 2017)
- World Cup: Winner (2011,2014, 2018).
- Pro Tour Winner (11): Kuwait Open (2009); English, UAE, Austrian Open (2011); Slovenian, Polish Open (2012); Austrian, Qatar, Russian Open (2013); China Open (2014); Korea, China Open (2016); China Open (2017)
  Runner-up (4): German Open (2010); Qatar, Harmony China <Suzhou> Open (2011); KRA Korea Open (2012); Kuwait, China, Polish Open (2015); Kuwait, Qatar, Japan Open (2016).
- Pro Tour Grand Finals Winner (1): Lisbon, Portugal (2015)
  appearances: 4. Record: runner-up (2009, 11,12,13).
- Asian Championships: winner (2009).
- Asian Cup: Winner (2014); 2nd (2010); 3rd (2009).
- World Junior Championships: winner (2005).
- Olympics: Silver Medal (2012), Gold Medal (2016)

Women's Doubles

- World Championships: winner (2017), runner-up (2009, 2011,2013,2015).
- Pro Tour Winner (18): Danish, China (Tianjin) Open (2009); Qatar Open (2010); Austrian Open (2011); Hungarian, Slovenian, KRA Korea Open (2012); Austrian, Kuwait, Qatar, Russian Open (2013); China Open (2014); Kuwait, Polish Open (2015); Kuwait, Qatar, Japan, Korean Open (2016); China Open (2017)
  Runner-up (8): China (Nanjing) Open 2007; Qatar Open (2009); Kuwait, German, China Open (2010); English, Qatar, Harmony China <Suzhou> Open (2011); China Open (2012,16)
- Pro Tour Grand Finals appearances: 3. Record: winner (2009,2013,2015).
- Asian Games: runner-up (2010).
- Asian Championships: winner (2009).
- China National Games: winner (2017).

Mixed Doubles

- World Championships: round of 16 (2007).
- Asian Games: quarterfinal (2010)
- Asian Championships: runner-up (2009).
- China National Games: Winner (2013)

Team

- World Championships: 1st (2012,2014,2016, 2018); 2nd (2010).
- World Team Cup: 1st (2009, 2010, 2011, 2013, 2015, 2018).
- Asian Games: 1st (2010, 2014).
- Asian Championships: 1st (2009, 2012, 2013, 2015).

Olympic 2012

- (Byes up to Round 3 as Ranked 1)
- Round 3: Beat Daniela Dodean 4–0.
- Round 4: Beat Jiang Huajun 4–1.
- QF: Beat Ai Fukuhara 4–0.
- SF: Beat Feng Tianwei 4–2.
- F: Lost Li Xiaoxia 1–4.

Olympic 2016

- (Byes up to Round 3 as Ranked 1)
- Round 3: Beat Elizabeta Samara 4–0.
- Round 4: Beat Doo Hoi Kem 4–0.
- QF: Beat Han Ying 4–0.
- SF: Beat Kim Song I 4–1.
- F: Beat Li Xiaoxia 4–3.

Olympic Games
| Preceded by Xu Lijia | Flagbearer for China at the Olympics closing ceremony Rio de Janeiro 2016 | Succeeded by Su Bingtian |
