= Zhu Yuling =

Chinese table tennis player

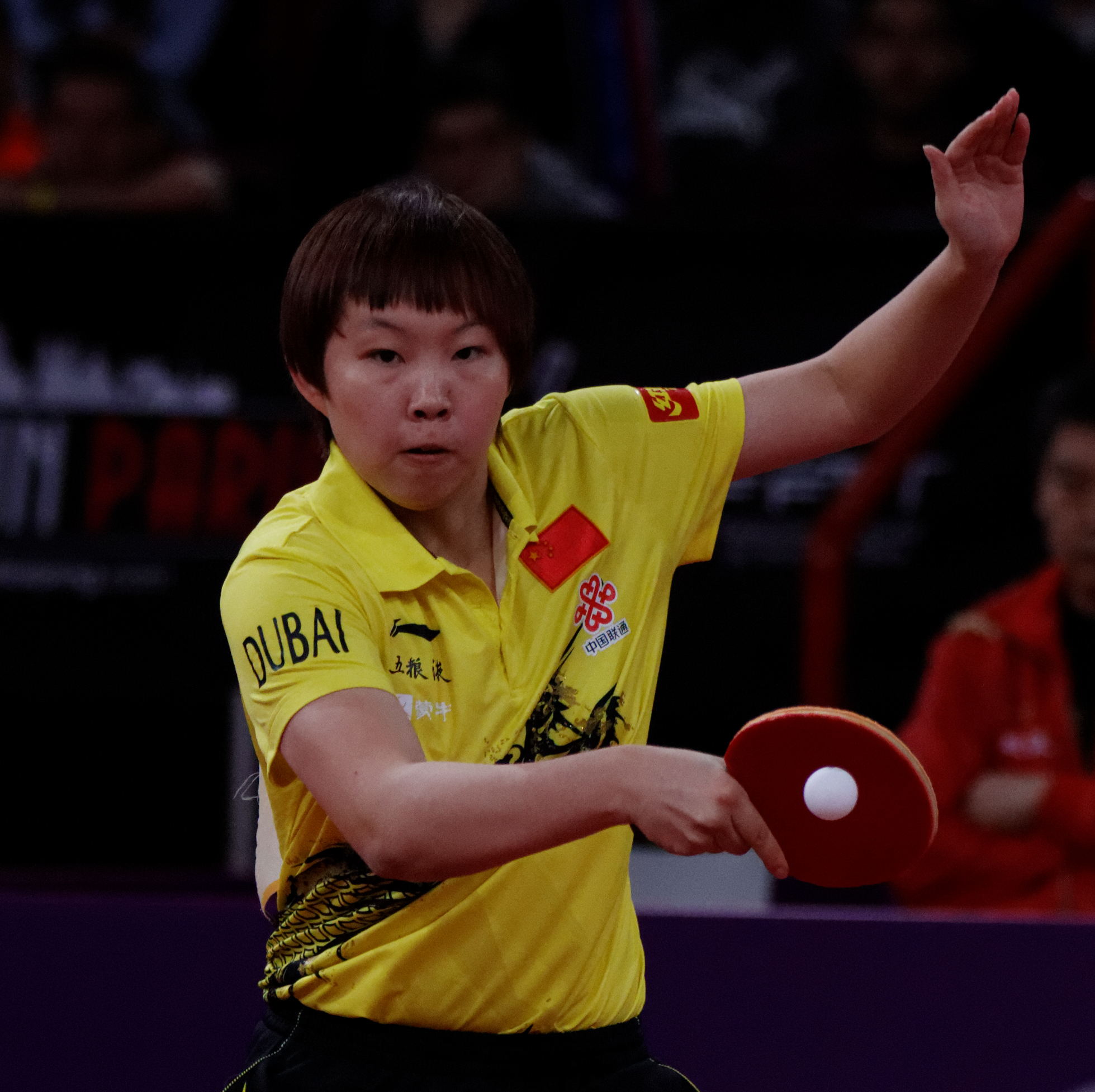

Personal information
- Nationality: China; Representing Macau Table Tennis Association (since 2024)
- Born: 10 January 1995 (age 31) Mianyang, Sichuan, China
- Height: 1.61 m (5 ft 3 in)
- Weight: 56 kg (123 lb)

Sport
- Sport: Table tennis
- Playing style: Right-handed, shakehand grip
- Highest ranking: 1 (November 2017)
- Current ranking: 8 (28 September 2026)
Medal record
Women's Table Tennis
Representing China
Event	1st	2nd	3rd
World Championships	4	2	3
World Cup	3	2	0
World Championships
Gold medal – first place	2014 Tokyo	Team
Gold medal – first place	2015 Suzhou	Doubles
Gold medal – first place	2016 Kuala Lumpur	Team
Gold medal – first place	2018 Halmstad	Team
Silver medal – second place	2017 Düsseldorf	Singles
Silver medal – second place	2017 Düsseldorf	Doubles
Bronze medal – third place	2013 Paris	Doubles
Bronze medal – third place	2013 Paris	Singles
Bronze medal – third place	2019 Budapest	Doubles
World Cup
Gold medal – first place	2015 Dubai	Team
Gold medal – first place	2017 Markham	Singles
Gold medal – first place	2018 London	Team
Silver medal – second place	2018 Chengdu	Singles
Silver medal – second place	2019 Chengdu	Singles
Asian Games
Gold medal – first place	2014 Incheon	Doubles
Gold medal – first place	2014 Incheon	Team
Gold medal – first place	2018 Jakarta	Team
Silver medal – second place	2014 Incheon	Singles
Asian Championships
Gold medal – first place	2013 Busan	Doubles
Gold medal – first place	2013 Busan	Team
Gold medal – first place	2015 Pattaya	Singles
Gold medal – first place	2015 Pattaya	Team
Gold medal – first place	2017 Wuxi	Doubles
Gold medal – first place	2017 Wuxi	Team
Bronze medal – third place	2013 Busan	Singles
Bronze medal – third place	2013 Busan	Mixed doubles
Bronze medal – third place	2015 Pattaya	Doubles
Bronze medal – third place	2017 Wuxi	Singles
Asian Cup
Gold medal – first place	2017 Ahmedabad	Singles
Gold medal – first place	2018 Yokohama	Singles
Gold medal – first place	2019 Yokohama	Singles
Bronze medal – third place	2015 Jaipur	Singles
East Asian Games
Gold medal – first place	2013 Tianjin	Doubles
Gold medal – first place	2013 Tianjin	Team
Silver medal – second place	2013 Tianjin	Singles
World Junior Championships
Gold medal – first place	2010 Bratislava	Singles
Gold medal – first place	2010 Bratislava	Doubles
Gold medal – first place	2011 Manama	Team
Gold medal – first place	2012 Hyderabad	Singles
Gold medal – first place	2012 Hyderabad	Doubles
Gold medal – first place	2012 Hyderabad	Team
Silver medal – second place	2010 Bratislava	Mixed doubles
Silver medal – second place	2010 Bratislava	Team
Silver medal – second place	2011 Manama	Singles
Silver medal – second place	2011 Manama	Doubles
Bronze medal – third place	2011 Manama	Mixed doubles
Bronze medal – third place	2012 Hyderabad	Mixed doubles

Zhu Yuling (Chinese: 朱雨玲; born 10 January 1995) is a Chinese table tennis player representing Macau.

== Career ==
Zhu was born in Mianyang in 1995 and began playing table tennis at the age of five, as it kept her occupied while she was ill. At the age of nine, she and her mother moved so that she could train, and she joined the provincial team when she was twelve. She was selected for the Chinese national team at fifteen. In addition to her academic studies, she trained nine hours a day, leaving little time for her family.

She is the two-time winner of the World Junior Table Tennis Championships in girls' singles. She was a semi-finalist at the 2013 World Table Tennis Championships. In 2016, Zhu was a reserve player at the Summer Olympics in Rio.

In 2017, Zhu advanced to the women's singles final at the World Championships, where she lost to her compatriot Ding Ning in six games. She ascended to the world number one ranking in November after a thrilling 4–3 win against Liu Shiwen at the ITTF Women's World Cup in Markham, Ontario.

Zhu began experiencing health issues in 2019 and was diagnosed with a benign tumor in 2020. In order to pursue a spot at the Tokyo Olympics, she delayed treatment. She eventually underwent surgery to remove the tumor in 2021 and left the Chinese national team later that year. In 2022, she began her Doctorate of Business Administration program at the University of Electronic Science and Technology of China. A year later, she became an associate professor in the sports department at Tianjin University.

In 2023, Zhu applied to transfer her registration to Macau through a foreign talent introduction program and officially acquired citizenship the following year. She returned to the international stage for the first time in over four years, representing Macau at the WTT Champions event in September 2024. In October, she captured a WTT Feeder singles title, and in 2025, she won the women's singles title at the WTT United States Smash.

== Achievements ==
=== Major and Asian tournaments ===
Best results in major and Asian tournaments
Tournaments	Events		
Tournaments	Singles	Women's doubles	Team
World Championships	2nd	1st	1st
World Cup	1st	—	1st
Asian Games	2nd	1st	1st
Asian Championships	1st	1st	1st
Asian Cup	1st	—	—

=== Singles titles ===
Year	Tournament	Final opponent	Score	Ref
2014	ITTF World Tour, Kuwait Open	(China) Chen Meng	4–1	
2014	ITTF World Tour, Swedish Open	(China) Liu Shiwen	4–0	
2015	ITTF World Tour, China Open	(China) Ding Ning	4–0	
2015	Asian Championships	(China) Chen Meng	4–1	
2016	ITTF World Tour Grand Finals	(Germany) Han Ying	4–0	
2017	Asian Cup	(China) Liu Shiwen	4–3	
2017	World Cup	(China) Liu Shiwen	4–3	
2018	Asian Cup	(China) Chen Meng	4–1	
2018	ITTF World Tour Platinum, Korean Open	(China) Chen Meng	4–1	
2019	Asian Cup	(China) Chen Meng	4–2	
2019	T2 Diamond Malaysia	(China) Wang Manyu	4–1	
2024	WTT Feeder Cagliari	(Japan) Sakura Yokoi	3–2	
2025	WTT United States Smash	(China) Chen Yi	4–2	
2026	WTT Champions Doha	(China) Chen Xingtong	4–2	
2026	WTT Star Contender Doha	(Japan) Hitomi Sato	4–2	
