= Krisztina Ambrus =

Hungarian table tennis player

Personal information
- Nationality: Hungarian
- Born: 24 August 1992 (age 32)

Sport
- Sport: Table tennis

Krisztina Ambrus (born 24 August 1992) is a Hungarian table tennis player.

== Career ==
Her highest career ITTF ranking was 105.
