= Rahel Aschwanden =

Swiss table tennis player (born 1993)

Personal information
- Nationality: Swiss
- Born: 21 October 1993 (age 32)

Sport
- Sport: Table tennis

Rahel Aschwanden (born 21 October 1993) is a Swiss table tennis player. Her highest career ITTF ranking was 141.
