= Liu Shiwen =

Chinese table tennis player

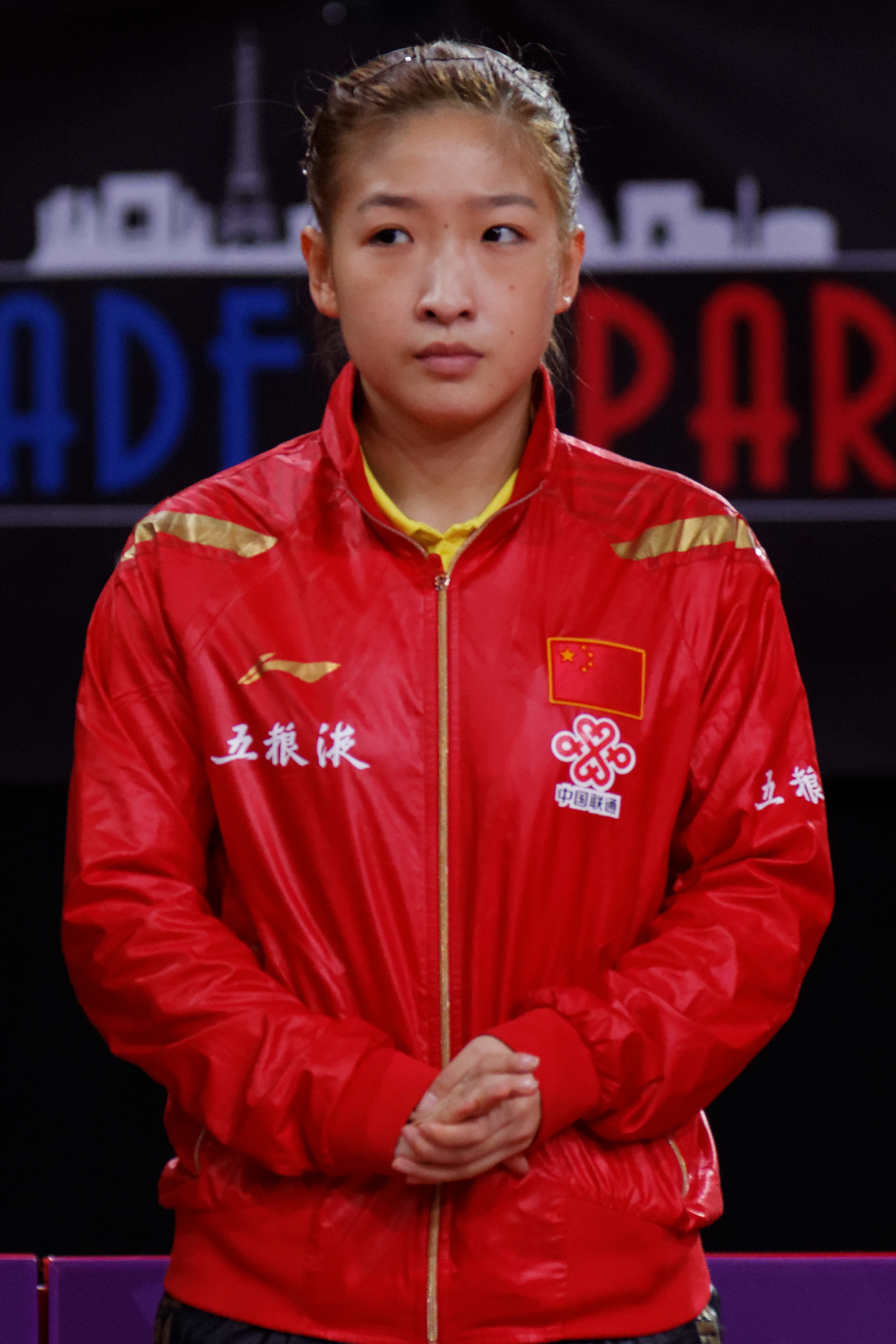
- Liu in 2013

Personal information
- Native name: 刘诗雯
- Nickname: Sunny
- Nationality: Chinese
- Born: 12 April 1991 (age 35) Liaoning, China
- Height: 161 cm (5 ft 3 in)

Sport
- Sport: Table tennis
- Playing style: Right-handed, shakehand grip
- Highest ranking: 1 (January 2010)
Medal record
Women's Table Tennis
Representing China
Event	1st	2nd	3rd
Olympic Games	1	1	0
World Championships	8	4	3
World Cup	11	1	0
Total	20	6	3
Olympic Games
Gold medal – first place	2016 Rio de Janeiro	Team
Silver medal – second place	2020 Tokyo	Mixed doubles
World Championships
Gold medal – first place	2012 Dortmund	Team
Gold medal – first place	2014 Tokyo	Team
Gold medal – first place	2015 Suzhou	Doubles
Gold medal – first place	2016 Kuala Lumpur	Team
Gold medal – first place	2017 Düsseldorf	Doubles
Gold medal – first place	2018 Halmstad	Team
Gold medal – first place	2019 Budapest	Singles
Gold medal – first place	2019 Budapest	Mixed doubles
Silver medal – second place	2010 Moscow	Team
Silver medal – second place	2013 Paris	Doubles
Silver medal – second place	2013 Paris	Singles
Silver medal – second place	2015 Suzhou	Singles
Bronze medal – third place	2009 Yokohama	Singles
Bronze medal – third place	2011 Rotterdam	Singles
Bronze medal – third place	2017 Düsseldorf	Singles
World Cup
Gold medal – first place	2009 Guangzhou	Singles
Gold medal – first place	2009 Linz	Team
Gold medal – first place	2010 Dubai	Team
Gold medal – first place	2012 Huangshi	Singles
Gold medal – first place	2013 Guangzhou	Team
Gold medal – first place	2013 Kobe	Singles
Gold medal – first place	2015 Dubai	Team
Gold medal – first place	2015 Sendai	Singles
Gold medal – first place	2018 London	Team
Gold medal – first place	2019 Chengdu	Singles
Gold medal – first place	2019 Tokyo	Team
Silver medal – second place	2017 Markham	Singles
Asian Games
Gold medal – first place	2010 Guangzhou	Team
Gold medal – first place	2014 Incheon	Team
Gold medal – first place	2014 Incheon	Singles
Silver medal – second place	2010 Guangzhou	Doubles
Silver medal – second place	2014 Incheon	Doubles
Asian Championships
Gold medal – first place	2005 Jeju-do	Doubles
Gold medal – first place	2009 Lucknow	Team
Gold medal – first place	2012 Macau	Team
Gold medal – first place	2013 Busan	Team
Gold medal – first place	2013 Busan	Singles
Gold medal – first place	2015 Pattaya	Team
Gold medal – first place	2019 Yogyakarta	Mixed doubles
Silver medal – second place	2013 Busan	Doubles
Silver medal – second place	2019 Yogyakarta	Singles
Bronze medal – third place	2005 Jeju-do	Team
Bronze medal – third place	2009 Lucknow	Singles
Bronze medal – third place	2009 Lucknow	Mixed doubles
Bronze medal – third place	2012 Macau	Singles
Asian Cup
Gold medal – first place	2010 Guangzhou	Singles
Gold medal – first place	2012 Guangzhou	Singles
Gold medal – first place	2013 Hong Kong	Singles
Gold medal – first place	2016 Dubai	Singles
Silver medal – second place	2009 Hangzhou	Singles
Silver medal – second place	2015 Jaipur	Singles
Silver medal – second place	2017 Ahmedabad	Singles
National Games of China
Gold medal – first place	2021 Shaanxi	Mixed doubles
Bronze medal – third place	2021 Shaanxi	Singles
World Junior Championships
Gold medal – first place	2004 Kobe	Team
Gold medal – first place	2004 Kobe	Mixed doubles
Gold medal – first place	2004 Kobe	Doubles
Silver medal – second place	2004 Kobe	Singles
Asian Junior Championships
Gold medal – first place	2004 New Delhi	Team
Gold medal – first place	2004 New Delhi	Doubles
Bronze medal – third place	2004 New Delhi	Singles

Liu Shiwen (Chinese: 刘诗雯; pinyin: Liú Shīwén; born 12 April 1991) is a Chinese table tennis player. She is a five-time World Cup champion, one-time World Champion, three-time ITTF World Tour Grand Finals champion and four-time Asian Cup champion.

She held the ITTF No. 1 rank for nine consecutive months from January to September 2010, thirteen consecutive months during 2013–2014, and eleven consecutive months during 2015–2016. Also, she has been consistently ranked first or second in ITTF Women's World ranking from early 2012 to mid-2017 (with no lower rank than third).

== Equipment ==
Liu Shiwen currently uses a Custom made Butterfly ZLC with a black DHS Hurricane 3 NEO Blue Sponge (2.1mm,39.5°) for her forehand and a red Dignics for her backhand.

== Career ==
In 2019, Liu won the world championships. In a sit-down interview with CCTV, Liu discussed her 2019 World Championship run, placing a big emphasis on the psychological aspect. She noted that she felt like an underdog against both Ding Ning in the semi-finals and Chen Meng in the finals.

In 2020, Liu's season was cut short by the coronavirus pandemic. She did not return for ITTF's restart events at the end of the year due to injury. Liu was expected to return in 2021 at WTT Doha, but plans were cut short by China's decision to withdraw due to coronavirus concerns.

=== 2021 ===
After getting surgery for an elbow injury that sidelined her through most of 2020, Liu began training with her teammates again in January.

In March, Liu participated in the Chinese National Team training camp and played in the China National Games Qualifying tournament, where she stated that she felt that she was fully recovered from her injury. National team coach Li Sun stated that Liu looked even better than expected in training camp, which prompted speculation that Liu was a front-runner to represent China in the singles event at the Tokyo Olympics. However, Liu lost 4–0 to Zhu Yuling in the quarter finals of the China Olympic Scrimmage in May.

In May, Liu was selected to represent China in the team event but not the singles event at the Tokyo Olympics. However, shortly after she lost 4–0 to He Zhuojia in the quarter-finals of the second leg of the China Olympic Scrimmage.

Liu played mixed doubles with Xu Xin at the Tokyo Olympics. In an interview in July, Liu stated that their doubles chemistry was better than ever before.

In July, Liu and Xu Xin won silver in the mixed doubles event at the Tokyo Olympics being upset 4-3 by Japan's Mima Ito and Jun Mizutani despite initially leading 2–0. Following the loss, Liu withdrew from the team event and was replaced by Wang Manyu.

In September, Liu reached the quarter-finals of the women's singles at the China National Games. After her round of 16 victory over Gu Yuting, Liu stated that the China National Games was her first real tournament in a year and a half. Liu defeated Gu Yuting to reach the semi-finals of the women's singles event, and won the mixed doubles gold medal with Xu Xin. Liu went on to win bronze in women's singles after losing to Sun Yingsha 4–0 in the semi-finals and defeating Chen Meng 3–1 in the bronze medal match.

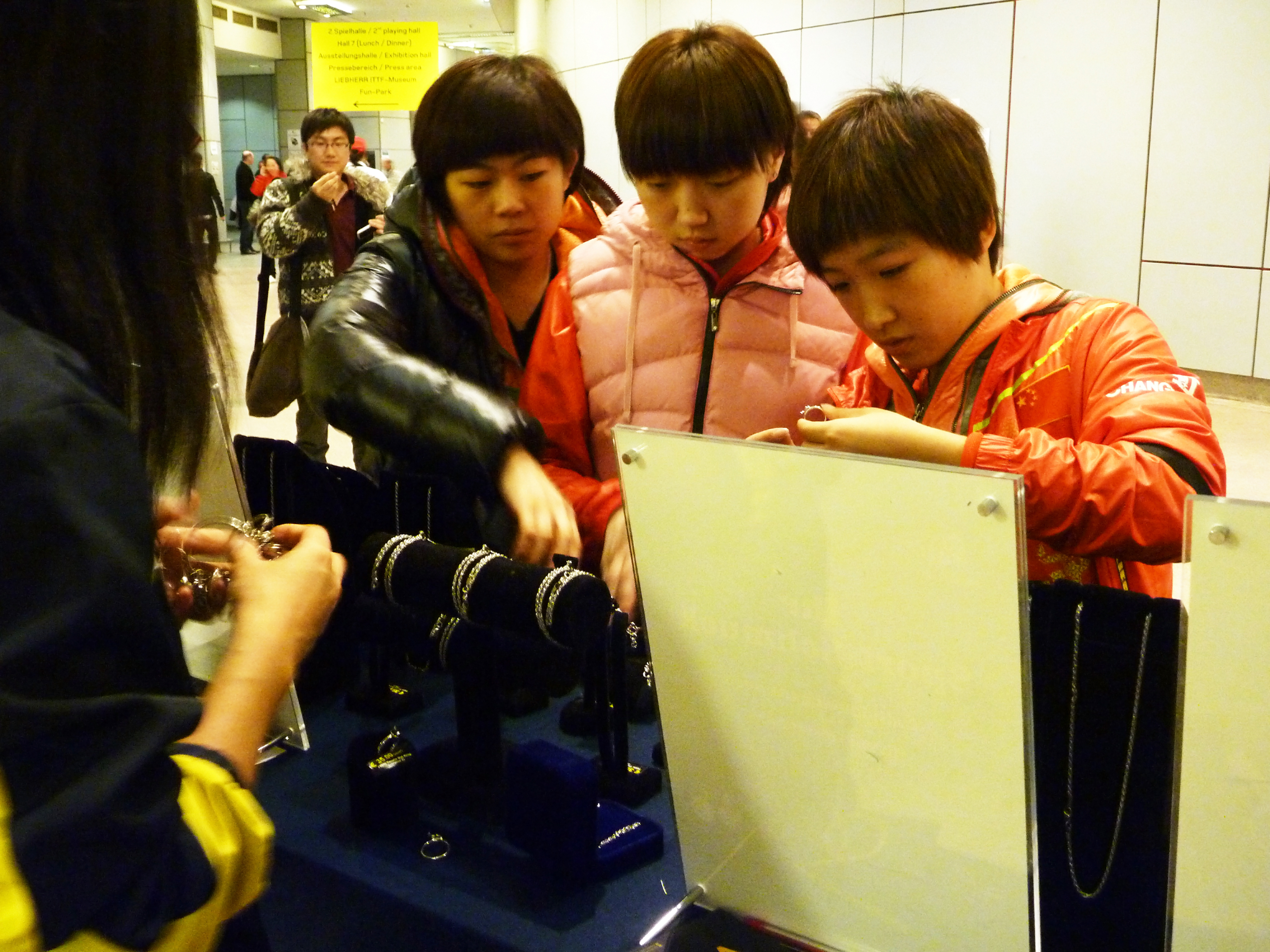
Liu (front) and teammates Cao Zhen and Fan Ying looking at jewelry in 2012.

In December 2022, Liu was elected president of the FIBT Athletes' Commission for a four-year term. In April 2023, she became vice-president of the Guangdong Provincial Ping Association.

== Career records ==
Singles (as of 18 June 2019)

- World Championships: Winner (2019), Runner-up (2013, 2015), SF (2009, 2011, 2017)
- World Cup: Winner (2009, 2012, 2013, 2015, 2019), Runner-up (2017)
- Asian Games: Winner (2014)
- Asian Championships: Winner (2013), SF (2009, 2012, 2017), Runner-up (2019)
- Asian Cup: Winner (2010, 2012, 2013, 2016), Runner-up (2009, 2015, 2017)
- World Junior Championships: Runner-up (2004)
- Asian Junior Championships: SF (2004)
- Pro Tour Grand Finals: Winner (3) London, England (2011), Hangzhou, China (2012), Dubai, UAE (2013).
- Pro Tour / ITTF World Tour
  - Winner (14):
    - 2009: Danish Open, China (Suzhou) Open, China (Tianjin) Open
    - 2010: Kuwait Open 2010
    - 2011: Qatar Open 2011
    - 2012: Hungary Open, Korea Open
    - 2013: Kuwait Open, Dubai Open
    - 2015: Polish Open
    - 2016: Qatar Open, Japan Open
    - 2018: Qatar Open, Australia Open
  - Runner-up (16):
    - 2009: English Open
    - 2010: Qatar Open
    - 2011: Sweden Open, Austria Open
    - 2012: Slovenia Open, China (Shanghai) Open, China (Suzhou) Open
    - 2013: Qatar Open, China (Suzhou) Open, Russian Open
    - 2014: China (Chengdu) Open, Sweden Open
    - 2016: Korea Open, China (Chengdu) Open
    - 2019: Qatar Open, Japan Open
- ITTF Challenge:
  - Winner: Thailand Open (2018)

Doubles

- World Championships: Winner (2015, 2017), Runner-up (2013), QF (2007, 2009)
- Asian Games: Runner-up (2010, 2014)
- Asian Championships: Winner (2005)
- World Junior Championships: Winner (2004)
- Asian Junior Championships: Winner (2004)
- Pro Tour Grand Finals: Winner (2009)
- Pro Tour /ITTF World Tour
  - Winner (20)
    - 2008: Korea Open 2008
    - 2009: Danish Open, China (Tianjin) Open
    - 2010: Qatar Open
    - 2011: China (Shenzhen) Open
    - 2012: Hungary Open, Korea Open
    - 2013: China (Changchun) Open, Russian Open
    - 2014: Kuwait Open, China (Chengdu) Open, Sweden Open
    - 2015: China (Chengdu) Open
    - 2016: Kuwait Open, Qatar Open, Korea Open
    - 2017: China
    - 2018: Japan
    - 2019: China Open, Japan Open
  - Runner-up (7)
    - 2007: China (Nanjing) Open
    - 2009: Qatar Open, China (Suzhou) Open
    - 2010: Kuwait Open, China (Suzhou) Open
    - 2016: Japan Open, China (Chengdu) Open

Mixed doubles

- Olympic Games: Runner-up (2020)
- World Championships: Winner (2019)
- Asian Championships: Winner (2019), SF (2009)
- World Junior Championships: Winner (2004)
- ITTF World Tour:
  - Winner (3)
    - 2018: Austria Open
    - 2019: Hungary Open, Qatar Open, Sweden Open

Team

- Olympics: Winner (2016)
- World Championships: Winner (2012, 2014, 2016, 2018), Runner-up (2010)
- World Team Cup: Winner (2009, 2010, 2013, 2015, 2018, 2019)
- Asian Games: Winner (2010, 2014)
- Asian Championships: Winner (2009, 2012, 2013, 2015); Second Runner-up (2005)
- World Junior Championships: Winner (2004)
- Asian Junior Championships: Winner (2004)
