= Cheng I-ching =

Taiwanese table tennis player

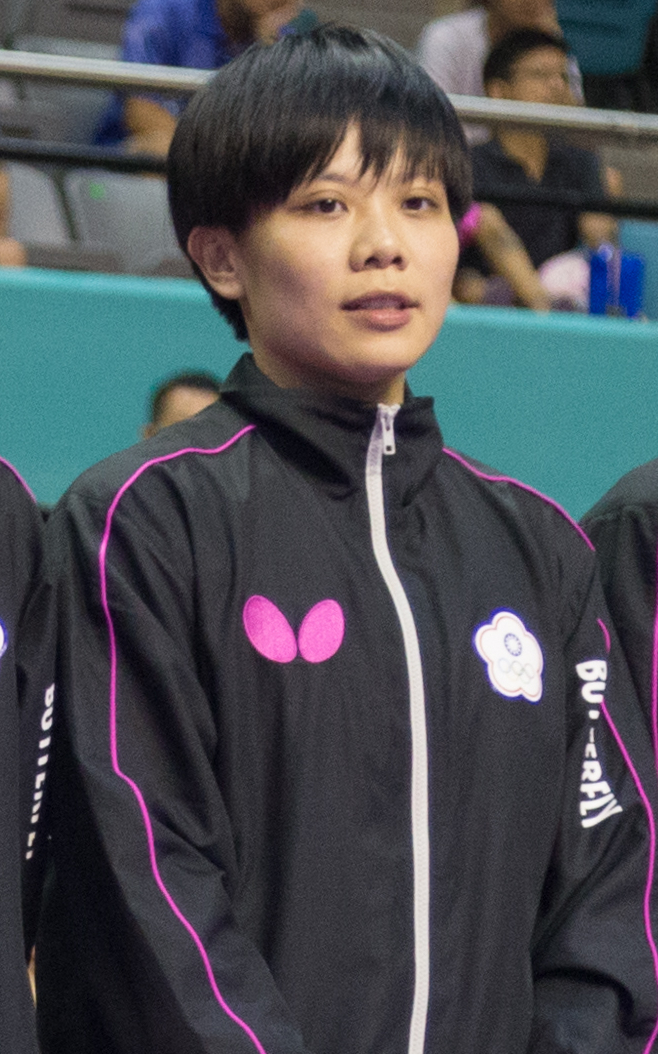
- Cheng at the 2016 World Championships

Personal information
- Nationality: Republic of China
- Born: 15 February 1992 (age 34) Tainan, Taiwan
- Height: 1.62 m (5 ft 4 in)

Sport
- Sport: Table tennis
- Playing style: Right-handed shakehand grip
- Highest ranking: 5 (February 2017)
- Current ranking: 28 (28 September 2026)
Medal record
Women's table tennis
Representing Chinese Taipei
Olympic Games
Bronze medal – third place	2020 Tokyo	Mixed doubles
World Championships
Silver medal – second place	2017 Düsseldorf	Mixed doubles
Bronze medal – third place	2016 Kuala Lumpur	Team
Bronze medal – third place	2021 Houston	Mixed doubles
Bronze medal – third place	2022 Chengdu	Team
World Cup
Silver medal – second place	2016 Philadelphia	Singles
Bronze medal – third place	2017 Markham	Singles
Bronze medal – third place	2018 Chengdu	Singles
Bronze medal – third place	2019 Tokyo	Team

Cheng I-ching (Chinese: 鄭怡靜; pinyin: Zhèng Yíjìng; born 15 February 1992) is a Taiwanese table tennis player. She competed at the 2016 Summer Olympics in the women's singles event, in which she was eliminated in the quarterfinals by Li Xiaoxia, and as part of the Chinese Taipei team in the women's team event. Cheng helped Chinese Taipei woman's team win bronze at the World Team Championships and became the first Taiwanese-born medalist at the Woman's World Cup in 2016.

Cheng represented Chinese Taipei in the 2020 Tokyo Olympics in the mixed doubles event alongside Lin Yun-ju, in which they won the bronze medal. She is currently also a master's degree student in the Department of Physical Education of Fu Jen Catholic University.
