= Lee Ho Ching =

Hong Kong table tennis player

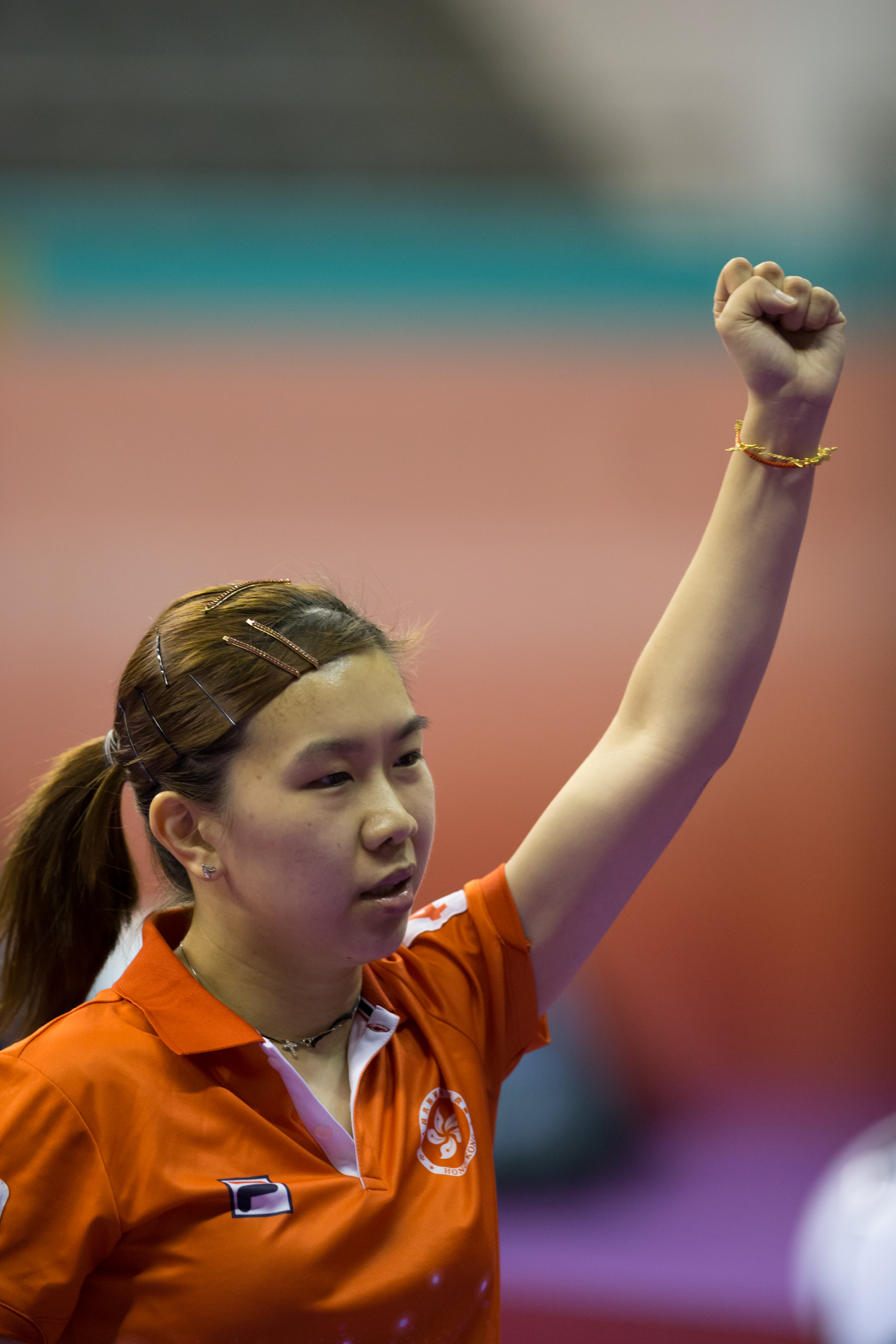
- Lee at the 2016 World Championships

Personal information
- Native name: 李皓晴 (jyutping: lei5 hou6 cing4)
- Born: 24 November 1992 (age 33) Hong Kong
- Height: 1.60 m (5 ft 3 in)
- Weight: 53 kg (117 lb)

Sport
- Sport: Table tennis
- Playing style: Right-handed shakehand
- Highest ranking: 12 (January 2018)
Medal record
Women's table tennis
Representing Hong Kong
Olympic Games
Bronze medal – third place	2020 Tokyo	Team
World Championships
Bronze medal – third place	2012 Dortmund	Team
Bronze medal – third place	2014 Tokyo	Team
Bronze medal – third place	2018 Halmstad	Team
Bronze medal – third place	2024 Busan	Team
Asian Games
Silver medal – second place	2014 Incheon	Mixed doubles
Bronze medal – third place	2014 Incheon	Doubles
Bronze medal – third place	2018 Jakarta-Palembang	Team
Bronze medal – third place	2018 Jakarta-Palembang	Mixed doubles
Asian Championships
Silver medal – second place	2013 Busan	Team
Silver medal – second place	2021 Doha	Doubles
Bronze medal – third place	2017 Wuxi	Team
Bronze medal – third place	2021 Doha	Mixed doubles
Bronze medal – third place	2021 Doha	Team
Bronze medal – third place	2023 Pyeongchang	Team
Bronze medal – third place	2024 Astana	Team

Lee Ho Ching (born 24 November 1992) is a Hong Kong table tennis player.

She qualified for the 2016 Summer Olympics in Rio de Janeiro, and was selected to represent Hong Kong in the women's singles and the women's team. At the 2020 Summer Olympics, she won a bronze medal with Doo Hoi Kem and Minnie Soo Wai Yam in the women's team event.

== Early life ==
Lee graduated from St. Rose of Lima's School and studied at Diocesan Girls' School. She dropped out at 15 years old to pursue a full-time athletic career.

== Career ==
Lee competed in the Tokyo Olympics in women's team with Doo Hoi Kem and Minnie Soo Wai Yam. They won bronze after beating Germany with 3–1, earning Hong Kong's first medal in the Olympics team event and second medal in table tennis.
