= 2016 European Table Tennis Championships =

- Date: 18 – 25 October
- Location: Budapest, Hungary
- Venue: Tüskecsarnok
- European Table Tennis Championships

The 2016 Liebherr European Table Tennis Championships were held in Budapest, Hungary from 18–23 October 2016. The competition was held at Tüskecsarnok

== Medal summary ==
=== Men's events ===
Event	Gold	Silver	Bronze
Singles	Emmanuel Lebesson; France	Simon Gauzy; France	Jakub Dyjas; Poland
Singles	Emmanuel Lebesson; France	Simon Gauzy; France	Timo Boll; Germany
Doubles	Patrick Franziska / Jonathan Groth; Germany / Denmark	Jakub Dyjas / Daniel Górak; Poland	Kristian Karlsson / Mattias Karlsson; Sweden
Doubles	Patrick Franziska / Jonathan Groth; Germany / Denmark	Jakub Dyjas / Daniel Górak; Poland	Tiago Apolónia / João Geraldo; Portugal

=== Women's events ===
Event	Gold	Silver	Bronze
Singles	Melek Hu; Turkey	Yu Fu; Portugal	Li Jie; Netherlands
Singles	Melek Hu; Turkey	Yu Fu; Portugal	Elizabeta Samara; Romania
Doubles	Kristin Silbereisen / Sabine Winter; Germany	Shan Xiaona / Petrissa Solja; Germany	Dóra Madarász / Szandra Pergel; Hungary
Doubles	Kristin Silbereisen / Sabine Winter; Germany	Shan Xiaona / Petrissa Solja; Germany	Daniela Monteiro Dodean / Elizabeta Samara; Romania

=== Mixed events ===
Event	Gold	Silver	Bronze
Doubles	João Monteiro / Daniela Monteiro Dodean; Portugal / Romania	Mattias Karlsson / Matilda Ekholm; Sweden	Aleksandar Karakašević / Rūta Paškauskienė; Serbia / Lithuania
Doubles	João Monteiro / Daniela Monteiro Dodean; Portugal / Romania	Mattias Karlsson / Matilda Ekholm; Sweden	Ovidiu Ionescu / Bernadette Szőcs; Romania

== Medal table ==
Rank	Nation	Gold	Silver	Bronze	Total
1	Germany (GER)	1.5	1	1	3.5
2	France (FRA)	1	1	0	2
3	Turkey (TUR)	1	0	0	1
4	Portugal (POR)	0.5	1	1	2.5
5	Romania (ROM)	0.5	0	3	3.5
6	Denmark (DEN)	0.5	0	0	0.5
7	Poland (POL)	0	1	1	2
7	Sweden (SWE)	0	1	1	2
9	Hungary (HUN)	0	0	1	1
9	Netherlands (NED)	0	0	1	1
11	Lithuania (LTU)	0	0	0.5	0.5
11	Serbia (SRB)	0	0	0.5	0.5
Totals (12 entries)		5	5	10	20

== See also ==
2016 ITTF World Tour

2016 ITTF World Tour Grand Finals
