= 2014 World Team Table Tennis Championships – Women's team =

2014 women's team

The women's team tournament of the 2014 World Team Table Tennis Championships was held from 28 April–5 May 2014. All matches were held at the Yoyogi National Gymnasium and the Tokyo Metropolitan Gymnasium in Tokyo, Japan.

== Medalists ==
| Event | Gold | Silver | Bronze |
|---|---|---|---|
| Team | China; Chen Meng; Ding Ning; Li Xiaoxia; Liu Shiwen; Zhu Yuling | Japan; Sayaka Hirano; Yuka Ishigaki; Kasumi Ishikawa; Sakura Mori; Saki Tashiro | Hong Kong; Doo Hoi Kem; Jiang Huajun; Lee Ho Ching; Ng Wing Nam; Tie Ya Na |
| Team | China; Chen Meng; Ding Ning; Li Xiaoxia; Liu Shiwen; Zhu Yuling | Japan; Sayaka Hirano; Yuka Ishigaki; Kasumi Ishikawa; Sakura Mori; Saki Tashiro | Singapore; Feng Tianwei; Li Siyun Isabelle; Yee Herng Hwee; Yu Mengyu |

== Championship division ==
The top three teams of each group played for places 1–12.

=== Preliminary round ===
==== Group A ====
| Team | Pld | W | L | GW | GL | Pts |
|---|---|---|---|---|---|---|
| China | 5 | 5 | 0 | 15 | 0 | 10 |
| North Korea | 5 | 4 | 1 | 12 | 7 | 9 |
| Romania | 5 | 3 | 2 | 10 | 7 | 8 |
| Austria | 5 | 2 | 3 | 8 | 11 | 7 |
| Poland | 5 | 1 | 4 | 6 | 12 | 6 |
| Slovakia | 5 | 0 | 5 | 1 | 15 | 5 |

28 April 2014; 19:00 | Report | China | 3–0 | Poland
Score by game:
Li Xiaoxia | 3–2 | Katarzyna Grzybowska
Ding Ning | 3–0 | Klaudia Kusinska
Liu Shiwen | 3–0 | Natalia Partyka

28 April 2014; 19:30 | Report | North Korea | 3–2 | Austria
Score by game:
Ri Myong-sun | 3–2 | Li Qiangbing
Kim Jong | 0–3 | Liu Jia
Ri Mi-gyong | 3–0 | Elena Waggermayer
Ri Myong-sun | 2–3 | Liu Jia
Kim Jong | 3–2 | Li Qiangbing
–

28 April 2014; 19:30 | Report | Romania | 3–0 | Slovakia
Score by game:
Elizabeta Samara | 3–0 | Eva Ódorová
Daniela Dodean | 3–1 | Barbora Balážová
Bernadette Szőcs | 3–1 | Eva Jurková

29 April 2014; 13:00 | Report | China | 3–0 | Slovakia
Score by game:
Ding Ning | 3–1 | Eva Ódorová
Zhu Yuling | 3–1 | Barbora Balážová
Liu Shiwen | 3–0 | Eva Jurková

29 April 2014; 13:00 | Report | North Korea | 3–1 | Romania
Score by game:
Kim Jong | 2–3 | Elizabeta Samara
Ri Myong-sun | 3–0 | Bernadette Szőcs
Ri Mi-Gyong | 3–1 | Camelia Postoaca
Ri Myong-sun | 3–0 | Elizabeta Samara

29 April 2014; 13:00 | Report | Poland | 1–3 | Austria
Score by game:
Natalia Partyka | 3–0 | Elena Waggermayer
Katarzyna Grzybowska | 1–3 | Liu Jia
Klaudia Kusinska | 0–3 | Li Qiangbing
Natalia Partyka | 0–3 | Liu Jia

29 April 2014; 19:30 | Report | China | 3–0 | Romania
Score by game:
Li Xiaoxia | 3–0 | Bernadette Szőcs
Chen Meng | 3–0 | Elizabeta Samara
Liu Shiwen | 3–1 | Camelia Postoaca

29 April 2014; 19:30 | Report | North Korea | 3–1 | Poland
Score by game:
Ri Myong-sun | 3–0 | Katarzyna Grzybowska
Kim Jong | 0–3 | Natalia Partyka
Ri Mi-gyong | 3–0 | Natalia Bajor
Kim Jong | 3–1 | Katarzyna Grzybowska

29 April 2014; 19:30 | Report | Slovakia | 1–3 | Austria
Score by game:
Eva Ódorová | 3–0 | Elena Waggermayer
Barbora Balážová | 1–3 | Liu Jia
Eva Jurková | 2–3 | Li Qiangbing
Eva Ódorová | 0–3 | Liu Jia

30 April 2014; 13:00 | Report | China | 3–0 | North Korea
Score by game:
Li Xiaoxia | 3–0 | Ri Myong-sun
Zhu Yuling | 3–1 | Ri Mi-gyong
Ding Ning | 3–0 | Kim Jong

30 April 2014; 13:00 | Report | Romania | 3–0 | Austria
Score by game:
Daniela Dodean | 3–1 | Liu Jia
Elizabeta Samara | 3–0 | Elena Waggermayer
Bernadette Szőcs | 3–2 | Li Qiangbing

30 April 2014; 13:00 | Report | Poland | 3–0 | Slovakia
Score by game:
Natalia Partyka | 3–1 | Barbora Balážová
Katarzyna Grzybowska | 3–2 | Eva Ódorová
Klaudia Kusinska | 3–1 | Eva Jurková

1 May 2014; 19:30 | Report | China | 3–0 | Austria
Score by game:
Liu Shiwen | 3–0 | Li Qiangbing
Ding Ning | 3–1 | Liu Jia
Chen Meng | 3–0 | Elena Waggermayer

1 May 2014; 19:30 | Report | North Korea | 3–0 | Slovakia
Score by game:
Ri Myong-sun | 3–2 | Barbora Balážová
Ri Mi-gyong | 3–1 | Eva Ódorová
Kim Hye-Song | 3–0 | Eva Jurková

1 May 2014; 19:30 | Report | Romania | 3–1 | Poland
Score by game:
Elizabeta Samara | 3–0 | Katarzyna Grzybowska
Bernadette Szőcs | 0–3 | Natalia Partyka
Camelia Postoaca | 3–2 | Natalia Bajor
Elizabeta Samara | 3–1 | Natalia Partyka

==== Group B ====
| Team | Pld | W | L | GW | GL | Pts |
|---|---|---|---|---|---|---|
| Japan | 5 | 5 | 0 | 15 | 0 | 10 |
| Chinese Taipei | 5 | 4 | 1 | 12 | 7 | 9 |
| Belarus | 5 | 3 | 2 | 11 | 10 | 8 |
| Hungary | 5 | 2 | 3 | 9 | 12 | 7 |
| United States | 5 | 1 | 4 | 7 | 12 | 6 |
| Australia | 5 | 0 | 5 | 2 | 15 | 5 |

28 April 2014; 19:30 | Report | Japan | 3–0 | Belarus
Score by game:
Sayaka Hirano | 3–1 | Viktoria Pavlovich
Kasumi Ishikawa | 3–0 | Aleksandra Privalova
Saki Tashiro | 3–1 | Maryia Kuchuk

28 April 2014; 19:30 | Report | Chinese Taipei | 3–0 | Australia
Score by game:
Cheng I-ching | 3–1 | Zhenhua Dederko
Huang Yi-hua | 3–0 | Miao Miao
Chen Szu-yu | 3–0 | Michelle Beaumont

28 April 2014; 19:30 | Report | Hungary | 3–2 | United States
Score by game:
Georgina Póta | 3–0 | Prachi Jha
Szandra Pergel | 0–3 | Lily Zhang
Dora Madarász | 3–0 | Crystal Wang
Georgina Póta | 2–3 | Lily Zhang
Szandra Pergel | 3–2 | Prachi Jha
–

29 April 2014; 13:00 | Report | Japan | 3–0 | United States
Score by game:
Yuka Ishigaki | 3–0 | Lily Zhang
Kasumi Ishikawa | 3–0 | Erica Wu
Sakura Mori | 3–2 | Prachi Jha

29 April 2014; 13:00 | Report | Chinese Taipei | 3–2 | Hungary
Score by game:
Cheng I-ching | 3–0 | Szandra Pergel
Chen Szu-yu | 1–3 | Georgina Póta
Huang Yi-hua | 1–3 | Dora Madarász
Cheng I-ching | 3–0 | Georgina Póta
Chen Szu-yu | 3–1 | Szandra Pergel
–

29 April 2014; 13:00 | Report | Belarus | 3–1 | Australia
Score by game:
Viktoria Pavlovich | 3–0 | Miao Miao
Aleksandra Privalova | 1–3 | Zhenhua Dederko
Elena Dubkova | 3–1 | Melissa Tapper
Viktoria Pavlovich | 3–1 | Zhenhua Dederko

29 April 2014; 19:30 | Report | Japan | 3–0 | Hungary
Score by game:
Yuka Ishigaki | 3–0 | Krisztina Ambrus
Kasumi Ishikawa | 3–1 | Szandra Pergel
Sayaka Hirano | 3–1 | Dora Madarász

29 April 2014; 19:30 | Report | Chinese Taipei | 3–2 | Belarus
Score by game:
Cheng I-ching | 3–0 | Aleksandra Privalova
Huang Yi-hua | 1–3 | Viktoria Pavlovich
Chen Szu-yu | 3–0 | Elena Dubkova
Cheng I-ching | 1–3 | Viktoria Pavlovich
Huang Yi-hua | 3–2 | Aleksandra Privalova
–

29 April 2014; 19:30 | Report | United States | 3–0 | Australia
Score by game:
Prachi Jha | 3–1 | Zhenhua Dederko
Lily Zhang | 3–0 | Miao Miao
Erica Wu | 3–0 | Melissa Tapper

30 April 2014; 16:30 | Report | Japan | 3–0 | Chinese Taipei
Score by game:
Yuka Ishigaki | 3–0 | Huang Yi-hua
Kasumi Ishikawa | 3–1 | Cheng I-ching
Sayaka Hirano | 3–1 | Chen Szu-yu

30 April 2014; 16:30 | Report | Hungary | 3–1 | Australia
Score by game:
Georgina Póta | 3–0 | Melissa Tapper
Dora Madarász | 0–3 | Zhenhua Dederko
Szandra Pergel | 3–0 | Michelle Beaumont
Georgina Póta | 3–0 | Zhenhua Dederko

30 April 2014; 16:30 | Report | Belarus | 3–2 | United States
Score by game:
Viktoria Pavlovich | 3–0 | Prachi Jha
Aleksandra Privalova | 1–3 | Lily Zhang
Elena Dubkova | 3–2 | Crystal Wang
Viktoria Pavlovich | 2–3 | Lily Zhang
Aleksandra Privalova | 3–2 | Prachi Jha
–

1 May 2014; 19:30 | Report | Japan | 3–0 | Australia
Score by game:
Sayaka Hirano | 3–0 | Zhenhua Dederko
Saki Tashiro | 3–0 | Melissa Tapper
Sakura Mori | 3–0 | Miao Miao

1 May 2014; 19:30 | Report | Chinese Taipei | 3–0 | United States
Score by game:
Cheng I-ching | 3–0 | Angela Guan
Chen Szu-yu | 3–0 | Lily Zhang
Huang Yi-hua | 3–0 | Erica Wu

1 May 2014; 19:30 | Report | Hungary | 1–3 | Belarus
Score by game:
Szandra Pergel | 0–3 | Viktoria Pavlovich
Georgina Póta | 3–1 | Aleksandra Privalova
Dora Madarász | 1–3 | Elena Dubkova
Georgina Póta | 1–3 | Viktoria Pavlovich

==== Group C ====
| Team | Pld | W | L | GW | GL | Pts |
|---|---|---|---|---|---|---|
| Singapore | 5 | 5 | 0 | 15 | 4 | 10 |
| South Korea | 5 | 4 | 1 | 13 | 7 | 9 |
| Netherlands | 5 | 2 | 3 | 11 | 10 | 7 |
| Luxembourg | 5 | 2 | 3 | 9 | 11 | 7 |
| France | 5 | 1 | 4 | 5 | 12 | 6 |
| Russia | 5 | 1 | 4 | 5 | 14 | 6 |

28 April 2014; 13:00 | Report | South Korea | 3–2 | Netherlands
Score by game:
Seo Hyo-Won | 2–3 | Li Jiao
Yang Ha-Eun | 3–1 | Li Jie
Seok Ha-Jung | 1–3 | Britt Eerland
Yang Ha-Eun | 3–2 | Li Jiao
Seo Hyo-Won | 3–0 | Li Jie
–

28 April 2014; 13:00 | Report | Singapore | 3–0 | Luxembourg
Score by game:
Feng Tianwei | 3–1 | Sarah de Nutte
Yu Mengyu | 3–2 | Ni Xialian
Li Isabelle Siyun | 3–1 | Tessy Gonderinger

28 April 2014; 13:00 | Report | Russia | 0–3 | France
Score by game:
Olga Baranova | 1–3 | Carole Grundisch
Yana Noskova | 1–3 | Laura Gasnier
Polina Mikhailova | 2–3 | Laura Pfefer

29 April 2014; 10:00 | Report | South Korea | 3–0 | France
Score by game:
Seo Hyo-Won | 3–0 | Laura Gasnier
Yang Ha-Eun | 3–1 | Carole Grundisch
Park Young-sook | 3–0 | Audrey Zarif

29 April 2014; 10:00 | Report | Singapore | 3–1 | Russia
Score by game:
Feng Tianwei | 3–1 | Elena Troshneva
Yu Mengyu | 3–1 | Maria Dolgikh
Li Isabelle Siyun | 2–3 | Olga Baranova
Feng Tianwei | 3–0 | Maria Dolgikh

29 April 2014; 10:00 | Report | Netherlands | 3–1 | Luxembourg
Score by game:
Li Jiao | 3–1 | Tessy Gonderinger
Li Jie | 2–3 | Ni Xialian
Britt Eerland | 3–2 | Sarah de Nutte
Li Jiao | 3–1 | Ni Xialian

29 April 2014; 19:30 | Report | South Korea | 3–0 | Russia
Score by game:
Yang Ha-Eun | 3–0 | Olga Baranova
Seo Hyo-Won | 3–0 | Elena Troshneva
Park Young-sook | 3–0 | Maria Dolgikh

29 April 2014; 19:30 | Report | Singapore | 3–1 | Netherlands
Score by game:
Feng Tianwei | 3–0 | Li Jie
Yu Mengyu | 3–2 | Li Jiao
Li Isabelle Siyun | 2–3 | Britt Eerland
Feng Tianwei | 3–1 | Li Jiao

29 April 2014; 19:30 | Report | France | 1–3 | Luxembourg
Score by game:
Carole Grundisch | 3–2 | Ni Xialian
Laura Gasnier | 2–3 | Sarah de Nutte
Audrey Zarif | 1–3 | Tessy Gonderinger
Laura Gasnier | 0–3 | Ni Xialian

30 April 2014; 13:00 | Report | South Korea | 1–3 | Singapore
Score by game:
Yang Ha-Eun | 2–3 | Feng Tianwei
Seo Hyo-Won | 1–3 | Yu Mengyu
Park Young-sook | 3–1 | Li Isabelle Siyun
Seo Hyo-Won | 1–3 | Feng Tianwei

30 April 2014; 13:00 | Report | Russia | 1–3 | Luxembourg
Score by game:
Olga Baranova | 2–3 | Sarah de Nutte
Maria Dolgikh | 0–3 | Ni Xialian
Elena Troshneva | 3–2 | Tessy Gonderinger
Olga Baranova | 0–3 | Ni Xialian

30 April 2014; 13:00 | Report | Netherlands | 3–0 | France
Score by game:
Li Jie | 3–0 | Laura Gasnier
Li Jiao | 3–0 | Carole Grundisch
Britt Eerland | 3–1 | Laura Pfefer

1 May 2014; 10:00 | Report | South Korea | 3–2 | Luxembourg
Score by game:
Yang Ha-Eun | 2–3 | Ni Xialian
Seok Ha-Jung | 0–3 | Sarah de Nutte
Seo Hyo-Won | 3–0 | Tessy Gonderinger
Yang Ha-Eun | 3–0 | Sarah de Nutte
Seok Ha-Jung | 3–2 | Ni Xialian
–

1 May 2014; 10:00 | Report | Singapore | 3–1 | France
Score by game:
Yu Mengyu | 3–0 | Audrey Zarif
Li Isabelle Siyun | 1–3 | Laura Gasnier
Feng Tianwei | 3–1 | Carole Grundisch
Yu Mengyu | 3–1 | Laura Gasnier

1 May 2014; 10:00 | Report | Russia | 3–2 | Netherlands
Score by game:
Polina Mikhailova | 3–2 | Li Jie
Maria Dolgikh | 0–3 | Li Jiao
Yana Noskova | 0–3 | Britt Eerland
Polina Mikhailova | 3–0 | Li Jiao
Maria Dolgikh | 3–2 | Li Jie
–

==== Group D ====
| Team | Pld | W | L | GW | GL | Pts |
|---|---|---|---|---|---|---|
| Hong Kong | 5 | 5 | 0 | 15 | 4 | 10 |
| Germany | 5 | 4 | 1 | 13 | 5 | 9 |
| Ukraine | 5 | 3 | 2 | 11 | 7 | 8 |
| Czech Republic | 5 | 2 | 3 | 8 | 11 | 7 |
| Croatia | 5 | 1 | 4 | 6 | 13 | 6 |
| Serbia | 5 | 0 | 5 | 2 | 15 | 5 |

28 April 2014; 13:00 | Report | Hong Kong | 3–0 | Czech Republic
Score by game:
Lee Ho Ching | 3–2 | Iveta Vacenovská
Jiang Huajun | 3–1 | Hana Matelová
Ng Wing Nam | 3–0 | Renata Štrbiková

28 April 2014; 13:00 | Report | Germany | 3–0 | Croatia
Score by game:
Wu Jiaduo | 3–2 | Lea Rakovac
Petrissa Solja | 3–1 | Tian Yuan
Kristin Silbereisen | 3–0 | Petra Petek

28 April 2014; 13:00 | Report | Ukraine | 3–0 | Serbia
Score by game:
Tetyana Sorochynska | 3–1 | Ana-Maria Erdelji
Margaryta Pesotska | 3–1 | Andrea Todorović
Ganna Gaponova | 3–1 | Aneta Maksuti

29 April 2014; 10:00 | Report | Hong Kong | 3–0 | Serbia
Score by game:
Lee Ho Ching | 3–0 | Andrea Todorović
Ng Wing Nam | 3–0 | Ana-Maria Erdelji
Doo Hoi Kem | 3–0 | Aneta Maksuti

29 April 2014; 10:00 | Report | Germany | 3–0 | Ukraine
Score by game:
Irene Ivancan | 3–0 | Margaryta Pesotska
Kristin Silbereisen | 3–0 | Tetyana Sorochynska
Sabine Winter | 3–0 | Ganna Gaponova

29 April 2014; 10:00 | Report | Czech Republic | 3–2 | Croatia
Score by game:
Renata Štrbiková | 1–3 | Tian Yuan
Iveta Vacenovská | 3–0 | Lea Rakovac
Hana Matelová | 3–0 | Ivana Tubikaneć
Iveta Vacenovská | 2–3 | Tian Yuan
Renata Štrbiková | 3–0 | Lea Rakovac
–

29 April 2014; 16:30 | Report | Hong Kong | 3–2 | Ukraine
Score by game:
Lee Ho Ching | 0–3 | Tetyana Sorochynska
Jiang Huajun | 2–3 | Margaryta Pesotska
Ng Wing Nam | 3–0 | Ganna Gaponova
Jiang Huajun | 3–2 | Tetyana Sorochynska
Lee Ho Ching | 3–1 | Margaryta Pesotska
–

29 April 2014; 16:30 | Report | Germany | 3–1 | Czech Republic
Score by game:
Irene Ivancan | 3–1 | Iveta Vacenovská
Petrissa Solja | 3–2 | Dana Čechová
Kristin Silbereisen | 2–3 | Renata Štrbiková
Petrissa Solja | 3–2 | Iveta Vacenovská

29 April 2014; 16:30 | Report | Serbia | 1–3 | Croatia
Score by game:
Ana-Maria Erdelji | 3–1 | Lea Rakovac
Andrea Todorović | 1–3 | Tian Yuan
Aneta Maksuti | 2–3 | Ivana Tubikaneć
Ana-Maria Erdelji | 0–3 | Tian Yuan

30 April 2014; 16:30 | Report | Hong Kong | 3–1 | Germany
Score by game:
Jiang Huajun | 1–3 | Irene Ivancan
Lee Ho Ching | 3–2 | Petrissa Solja
Ng Wing Nam | 3–1 | Kristin Silbereisen
Lee Ho Ching | 3–1 | Irene Ivancan

30 April 2014; 16:30 | Report | Ukraine | 3–0 | Croatia
Score by game:
Margaryta Pesotska | 3–0 | Lea Rakovac
Tetyana Sorochynska | 3–2 | Tian Yuan
Ganna Gaponova | 3–0 | Ivana Tubikaneć

30 April 2014; 16:30 | Report | Czech Republic | 3–0 | Serbia
Score by game:
Iveta Vacenovská | 3–1 | Ana-Maria Erdelji
Renata Štrbiková | 3–1 | Andrea Todorović
Dana Čechová | 3–0 | Aneta Maksuti

1 May 2014; 10:00 | Report | Hong Kong | 3–1 | Croatia
Score by game:
Doo Hoi Kem | 3–0 | Ivana Tubikaneć
Ng Wing Nam | 3–0 | Petra Petek
Tie Ya Na | 1–3 | Tian Yuan
Doo Hoi Kem | 3–1 | Petra Petek

1 May 2014; 10:00 | Report | Germany | 3–1 | Serbia
Score by game:
Sabine Winter | 2–3 | Andrea Todorović
Kristin Silbereisen | 3–0 | Ana-Maria Erdelji
Petrissa Solja | 3–0 | Aneta Maksuti
Sabine Winter | 3–2 | Ana-Maria Erdelji

1 May 2014; 10:00 | Report | Ukraine | 3–1 | Czech Republic
Score by game:
Tetyana Sorochynska | 0–3 | Renata Štrbiková
Margaryta Pesotska | 3–2 | Iveta Vacenovská
Ganna Gaponova | 3–0 | Dana Čechová
Margaryta Pesotska | 3–0 | Renata Štrbiková

=== Knockout stage ===
==== Places 1–12 ====
First round
Ukraine | 0
North Korea | 3
South Korea | 2
Romania | 3
Belarus | 0
Germany | 3
Chinese Taipei | 0
Netherlands | 3

Quarter-finals
China | 3
North Korea | 0
Romania | 1
Singapore | 3
Hong Kong | 3
Germany | 0
Netherlands | 2
Japan | 3

Semi-finals
China | 3
Singapore | 0
Hong Kong | 1
Japan | 3

Final
China | 3
Japan | 0

===== Round of 16 =====
2 May 2014; 13:00 | Report | North Korea | 3–0 | Ukraine
Score by game:
Ri Myong-sun | 3–0 | Margaryta Pesotska
Ri Mi-gyong | 3–0 | Tetyana Sorochynska
Kim Jong | 3–1 | Ganna Gaponova

2 May 2014; 13:00 | Report | South Korea | 2–3 | Romania
Score by game:
Seo Hyo-Won | 3–1 | Bernadette Szőcs
Yang Ha-Eun | 2–3 | Elizabeta Samara
Seok Ha-Jung | 2–3 | Daniela Dodean
Seo Hyo-Won | 3–1 | Elizabeta Samara
Yang Ha-Eun | 2–3 | Bernadette Szőcs
–

2 May 2014; 13:00 | Report | Chinese Taipei | 0–3 | Netherlands
Score by game:
Huang Yi-hua | 1–3 | Li Jiao
Cheng I-ching | 2–3 | Li Jie
Chen Szu-yu | 0–3 | Britt Eerland

2 May 2014; 16:30 | Report | Germany | 3–0 | Belarus
Score by game:
Sabine Winter | 3–1 | Viktoria Pavlovich
Irene Ivancan | 3–2 | Aleksandra Privalova
Petrissa Solja | 3–0 | Elena Dubkova

===== Quarterfinals =====
3 May 2014; 10:00 | Report | Singapore | 3–1 | Romania
Score by game:
Yu Mengyu | 3–2 | Elizabeta Samara
Feng Tianwei | 3–0 | Daniela Dodean
Li Isabelle Siyun | 2–3 | Bernadette Szőcs
Feng Tianwei | 3–0 | Elizabeta Samara

3 May 2014; 10:00 | Report | Hong Kong | 3–0 | Germany
Score by game:
Lee Ho Ching | 3–1 | Petrissa Solja
Jiang Huajun | 3–2 | Irene Ivancan
Ng Wing Nam | 3–0 | Sabine Winter

3 May 2014; 16:00 | Report | China | 3–0 | North Korea
Score by game:
Li Xiaoxia | 3–0 | Ri Mi-gyong
Liu Shiwen | 3–0 | Ri Myong-sun
Zhu Yuling | 3–1 | Kim Jong

3 May 2014; 19:00 | Report | Japan | 3–2 | Netherlands
Score by game:
Sayaka Hirano | 3–1 | Britt Eerland
Kasumi Ishikawa | 2–3 | Li Jiao
Yuka Ishigaki | 3–1 | Li Jie
Sayaka Hirano | 2–3 | Li Jiao
Kasumi Ishikawa | 3–2 | Britt Eerland
–

===== Semifinals =====
4 May 2014; 13:00 | Report | China | 3–0 | Singapore
Score by game:
Li Xiaoxia | 3–1 | Feng Tianwei
Ding Ning | 3–0 | Yu Mengyu
Zhu Yuling | 3–0 | Li Isabelle Siyun

4 May 2014; 19:30 | Report | Japan | 3–1 | Hong Kong
Score by game:
Yuka Ishigaki | 0–3 | Lee Ho Ching
Kasumi Ishikawa | 3–2 | Jiang Huajun
Sayaka Hirano | 3–2 | Ng Wing Nam
Kasumi Ishikawa | 3–2 | Lee Ho Ching

===== Final =====
5 May 2014; 19:30 | Report | China | 3–0 | Japan
Score by game:
Ding Ning | 3–1 | Yuka Ishigaki
Li Xiaoxia | 3–0 | Kasumi Ishikawa
Liu Shiwen | 3–0 | Sayaka Hirano

==== Places 13–24 ====
First Round
Serbia | 3
United States | 2
France | 1
Slovakia | 3
Australia | 1
Poland | 3
Croatia | 3
Russia | 2

Second Round
Czech Republic | 3
Serbia | 2
Slovakia | 2
Hungary | 3
Luxembourg | 0
Poland | 3
Croatia | 1
Austria | 3

Third Round
Czech Republic | 2
Hungary | 3
Poland | 3
Austria | 0

Position 13
Hungary | X
Poland | X

== Second division ==
The top three teams of each group played for places 25–36.

=== Preliminary round ===
==== Group E ====
| Team | Pld | W | L | GW | GL | Pts |
|---|---|---|---|---|---|---|
| Thailand | 5 | 5 | 0 | 15 | 4 | 10 |
| Canada | 5 | 3 | 2 | 11 | 8 | 8 |
| Egypt | 5 | 3 | 2 | 13 | 9 | 8 |
| Switzerland | 5 | 3 | 2 | 10 | 9 | 8 |
| Puerto Rico | 5 | 1 | 4 | 6 | 12 | 6 |
| Bosnia and Herzegovina | 5 | 0 | 5 | 2 | 15 | 5 |

| | BIH | CAN | EGY | PUR | SUI | THA |
|---|---|---|---|---|---|---|
| Bosnia and Herzegovina | | 0–3 | 0–3 | 0–3 | 0–3 | 2–3 |
| Canada | 3–0 | | 2–3 | 3–1 | 3–1 | 0–3 |
| Egypt | 3–0 | 3–2 | | 3–1 | 2–3 | 2–3 |
| Puerto Rico | 3–0 | 1–3 | 1–3 | | 1–3 | 0–3 |
| Switzerland | 3–0 | 1–3 | 3–2 | 3–1 | | 0–3 |
| Thailand | 3–2 | 3–0 | 3–2 | 3–0 | 3–0 | |

==== Group F ====
| Team | Pld | W | L | GW | GL | Pts |
|---|---|---|---|---|---|---|
| Lithuania | 5 | 4 | 1 | 13 | 7 | 9 |
| England | 5 | 4 | 1 | 13 | 5 | 9 |
| Malaysia | 5 | 3 | 2 | 11 | 9 | 8 |
| Wales | 5 | 2 | 3 | 10 | 12 | 7 |
| Israel | 5 | 1 | 4 | 7 | 13 | 6 |
| Colombia | 5 | 1 | 4 | 5 | 13 | 6 |

| | COL | ENG | ISR | LTU | MAS | WAL |
|---|---|---|---|---|---|---|
| Colombia | | 0–3 | 1–3 | 1–3 | 0–3 | 3–1 |
| England | 3–0 | | 3–0 | 1–3 | 3–0 | 3–2 |
| Israel | 3–1 | 0–3 | | 1–3 | 2–3 | 1–3 |
| Lithuania | 3–1 | 3–1 | 3–1 | | 1–3 | 3–1 |
| Malaysia | 3–0 | 0–3 | 3–2 | 3–1 | | 2–3 |
| Wales | 1–3 | 2–3 | 3–1 | 1–3 | 3–2 | |

==== Group G ====
| Team | Pld | W | L | GW | GL | Pts |
|---|---|---|---|---|---|---|
| India | 5 | 5 | 0 | 15 | 5 | 10 |
| Bulgaria | 5 | 4 | 1 | 14 | 9 | 9 |
| Portugal | 5 | 3 | 2 | 12 | 8 | 8 |
| Turkey | 5 | 2 | 3 | 9 | 11 | 7 |
| Nigeria | 5 | 1 | 4 | 6 | 13 | 6 |
| Italy | 5 | 0 | 5 | 5 | 15 | 5 |

| | BUL | IND | ITA | NGA | POR | TUR |
|---|---|---|---|---|---|---|
| Bulgaria | | 2–3 | 3–1 | 3–1 | 3–2 | 3–2 |
| India | 3–2 | | 3–1 | 3–1 | 3–1 | 3–0 |
| Italy | 1–3 | 1–3 | | 1–3 | 1–3 | 1–3 |
| Nigeria | 1–3 | 1–3 | 3–1 | | 0–3 | 1–3 |
| Portugal | 2–3 | 1–3 | 3–1 | 3–0 | | 3–1 |
| Turkey | 2–3 | 0–3 | 3–1 | 3–1 | 1–3 | |

==== Group H ====
| Team | Pld | W | L | GW | GL | Pts |
|---|---|---|---|---|---|---|
| Sweden | 5 | 4 | 1 | 12 | 5 | 9 |
| Brazil | 5 | 4 | 1 | 13 | 3 | 9 |
| Slovenia | 5 | 3 | 2 | 10 | 7 | 8 |
| Greece | 5 | 3 | 2 | 9 | 7 | 8 |
| Uzbekistan | 5 | 1 | 4 | 3 | 12 | 6 |
| Peru | 5 | 0 | 5 | 2 | 15 | 5 |

| | BRA | GRE | PER | SVN | SWE | UZB |
|---|---|---|---|---|---|---|
| Brazil | | 3–0 | 3–0 | 3–0 | 1–3 | 3–0 |
| Greece | 0–3 | | 3–1 | 0–3 | 3–0 | 3–0 |
| Peru | 0–3 | 1–3 | | 1–3 | 0–3 | 0–3 |
| Slovenia | 0–3 | 3–0 | 3–1 | | 1–3 | 3–0 |
| Sweden | 3–1 | 0–3 | 3–0 | 3–1 | | 3–0 |
| Uzbekistan | 0–3 | 0–3 | 3–0 | 0–3 | 0–3 | |

=== Knockout stage ===
==== Places 25–36 ====
First Round
Slovenia | 3
Bulgaria | 0
Brazil | 3
Egypt | 2
Malaysia | 0
Canada | 3
England | 3
Portugal | 1

Second Round
Thailand | 3
Slovenia | 1
Brazil | 3
India | 1
Sweden | 3
Canada | 1
England | 1
Lithuania | 3

Third Round
Thailand | 2
Brazil | 3
Sweden | 3
Lithuania | 2

Position 25–26
Brazil | 3
Sweden | 0

==== Places 37–48 ====
First Round
Peru | 0
Nigeria | 3
Israel | 3
Bosnia and Herzegovina | 0
Italy | 3
Uzbekistan | 1
Puerto Rico | 3
Colombia | 1

Second Round
Turkey | 1
Nigeria | 3
Israel | 3
Greece | 2
Wales | 2
Italy | 3
Puerto Rico | 0
Switzerland | 3

Third Round
Nigeria | 3
Israel | 2
Italy | 2
Switzerland | 3

Position 37
Nigeria | X
Switzerland | X

== Third division ==
The top three teams of each group played for places 49–60.

=== Preliminary round ===
==== Group I ====
| Team | Pld | W | L | GW | GL | Pts |
|---|---|---|---|---|---|---|
| Kazakhstan | 5 | 5 | 0 | 15 | 1 | 10 |
| Guatemala | 5 | 4 | 1 | 12 | 6 | 9 |
| Mongolia | 5 | 3 | 2 | 11 | 6 | 8 |
| El Salvador | 5 | 2 | 3 | 6 | 9 | 7 |
| Azerbaijan | 5 | 1 | 4 | 4 | 13 | 6 |
| New Caledonia | 5 | 0 | 5 | 2 | 15 | 5 |

| | AZE | ESA | GUA | KAZ | MGL | NCL |
|---|---|---|---|---|---|---|
| Azerbaijan | | 0–3 | 1–3 | 0–3 | 0–3 | 3–1 |
| El Salvador | 3–0 | | 0–3 | 0–3 | 0–3 | 3–0 |
| Guatemala | 3–1 | 3–0 | | 0–3 | 3–2 | 3–0 |
| Kazakhstan | 3–0 | 3–0 | 3–0 | | 3–0 | 3–1 |
| Mongolia | 3–0 | 3–0 | 2–3 | 0–3 | | 3–0 |
| New Caledonia | 1–3 | 0–3 | 0–3 | 1–3 | 0–3 | |

==== Group J ====
| Team | Pld | W | L | GW | GL | Pts |
|---|---|---|---|---|---|---|
| Moldova | 5 | 5 | 0 | 15 | 2 | 10 |
| Indonesia | 5 | 4 | 1 | 14 | 5 | 9 |
| Republic of the Congo | 5 | 3 | 2 | 11 | 10 | 8 |
| Dominican Republic | 5 | 2 | 3 | 8 | 9 | 7 |
| Kosovo | 5 | 1 | 4 | 5 | 12 | 6 |
| Kyrgyzstan | 5 | 0 | 5 | 0 | 15 | 5 |

| | CGO | DOM | INA | KGZ | KOS | MDA |
|---|---|---|---|---|---|---|
| Republic of the Congo | | 3–2 | 2–3 | 3–0 | 3–2 | 0–3 |
| Dominican Republic | 2–3 | | 0–3 | 3–0 | 3–0 | 3–0 |
| Indonesia | 3–2 | 3–0 | | 3–0 | 3–0 | 2–3 |
| Kyrgyzstan | 0–3 | 0–3 | 0–3 | | 0–3 | 0–3 |
| Kosovo | 2–3 | 0–3 | 0–3 | 3–0 | | 0–3 |
| Moldova | 3–0 | 3–0 | 3–2 | 3–0 | 3–0 | |

==== Group K ====
| Team | Pld | W | L | GW | GL | Pts |
|---|---|---|---|---|---|---|
| Iran | 5 | 5 | 0 | 15 | 2 | 10 |
| Estonia | 5 | 4 | 1 | 13 | 8 | 4 |
| Sri Lanka | 5 | 2 | 3 | 10 | 10 | 3 |
| Latvia | 5 | 2 | 3 | 9 | 11 | 3 |
| Ecuador | 5 | 2 | 3 | 8 | 11 | 2 |
| Algeria | 5 | 0 | 5 | 2 | 15 | 2 |

| | ALG | ECU | EST | IRN | LAT | SRI |
|---|---|---|---|---|---|---|
| Algeria | | 0–3 | 1–3 | 0–3 | 1–3 | 0–3 |
| Ecuador | 3–0 | | 1–3 | 0–3 | 1–3 | 3–2 |
| Estonia | 3–1 | 3–1 | | 1–3 | 3–1 | 3–2 |
| Iran | 3–0 | 3–0 | 3–1 | | 3–1 | 3–0 |
| Latvia | 3–1 | 3–1 | 1–3 | 1–3 | | 1–3 |
| Sri Lanka | 3–0 | 2–3 | 2–3 | 0–3 | 3–1 | |

==== Group L ====
| Team | Pld | W | L | GW | GL | Pts |
|---|---|---|---|---|---|---|
| New Zealand | 5 | 5 | 0 | 15 | 4 | 10 |
| Argentina | 5 | 3 | 2 | 11 | 11 | 8 |
| Mexico | 5 | 3 | 2 | 12 | 10 | 8 |
| Finland | 5 | 2 | 3 | 9 | 13 | 7 |
| Macau | 5 | 2 | 3 | 12 | 12 | 7 |
| Scotland | 5 | 0 | 5 | 6 | 15 | 5 |

| | ARG | FIN | MAC | MEX | NZL | SCO |
|---|---|---|---|---|---|---|
| Argentina | | 3–2 | 2–3 | 3–2 | 0–3 | 3–1 |
| Finland | 2–3 | | 3–2 | 1–3 | 0–3 | 3–2 |
| Macau | 3–2 | 2–3 | | 2–3 | 2–3 | 3–1 |
| Mexico | 2–3 | 3–1 | 2–3 | | 1–3 | 3–1 |
| New Zealand | 3–0 | 3–0 | 3–2 | 3–1 | | 3–1 |
| Scotland | 1–3 | 2–3 | 1–3 | 1–3 | 1–3 | |

=== Knockout stage ===
==== Places 49–60 ====
First Round
Republic of the Congo | 3
Estonia | 1
Guatemala | 1
Mexico | 3
Mongolia | 1
Indonesia | 3
Argentina | 3
Sri Lanka | 1

Second Round
Kazakhstan | 3
Republic of the Congo | 2
Mexico | 3
Iran | 1
New Zealand | 3
Indonesia | 1
Argentina | 0
Moldova | 3

Third Round
Kazakhstan | 1
Mexico | 3
New Zealand | 3
Moldova | 1

Position 49–50
Mexico | 1
New Zealand | 3

| Position 57–60 | | Position 57 |
| Estonia | 3 |
| Guatemala | 2 | Estonia | X |
| Mongolia | 3 | Mongolia | X |
| Sri Lanka | 0 |

==== Places 61–72 ====
First Round
Scotland | 3
Azerbaijan | 1
Ecuador | 3
New Caledonia | 0
Algeria | 3
Kosovo | 0
Macau | 3
Kyrgyzstan | 0

Second Round
Dominican Republic | 3
Scotland | 1
Ecuador | 3
Finland | 1
El Salvador | 3
Algeria | 1
Macau | 3
Latvia | 0

Third Round
Dominican Republic | 2
Ecuador | 3
El Salvador | 1
Macau | 3

Position 61
Ecuador | X
Macau | X

| Position 69–72 | | Position 69 |
| Azerbaijan | 3 |
| New Caledonia | 1 | Azerbaijan | X |
| Kosovo | 3 | Kosovo | X |
| Kyrgyzstan | 0 |

== Fourth division ==
The top three teams of each group played for places 73–84.

=== Preliminary round ===
==== Group M ====
| Team | Pld | W | L | GW | GL | Pts |
|---|---|---|---|---|---|---|
| Laos | 5 | 5 | 0 | 15 | 2 | 10 |
| Syria | 5 | 3 | 2 | 11 | 10 | 8 |
| Seychelles | 5 | 3 | 2 | 11 | 7 | 8 |
| Bangladesh | 5 | 3 | 2 | 10 | 7 | 7 |
| Costa Rica | 5 | 1 | 4 | 6 | 13 | 6 |
| Botswana | 5 | 0 | 5 | 1 | 15 | 4 |

| | BAN | BOT | CRC | LAO | SEY | SYR |
|---|---|---|---|---|---|---|
| Bangladesh | | 3–0 | 3–0 | 1–3 | 0–3 | 3–1 |
| Botswana | 0–3 | | 1–3 | 0–3 | 0–3 | 0–3 |
| Costa Rica | 0–3 | 3–1 | | 0–3 | 1–3 | 2–3 |
| Laos | 3–1 | 3–0 | 3–0 | | 3–0 | 3–1 |
| Seychelles | 3–0 | 3–0 | 3–1 | 0–3 | | 2–3 |
| Syria | 1–3 | 3–0 | 3–2 | 1–3 | 3–2 | |

==== Group N ====
| Team | Pld | W | L | GW | GL | Pts |
|---|---|---|---|---|---|---|
| Montenegro | 5 | 5 | 0 | 15 | 1 | 10 |
| Nepal | 5 | 4 | 1 | 12 | 6 | 9 |
| Qatar | 5 | 3 | 2 | 10 | 9 | 8 |
| San Marino | 5 | 2 | 3 | 10 | 11 | 7 |
| Maldives | 5 | 1 | 4 | 4 | 12 | 6 |
| Madagascar | 5 | 0 | 5 | 3 | 15 | 5 |

| | MAD | MDV | MNE | NEP | QAT | SMR |
|---|---|---|---|---|---|---|
| Madagascar | | 0–3 | 0–3 | 1–3 | 1–3 | 1–3 |
| Maldives | 3–0 | | 0–3 | 0–3 | 0–3 | 1–3 |
| Montenegro | 3–0 | 3–0 | | 3–0 | 3–0 | 3–1 |
| Nepal | 3–1 | 3–0 | 0–3 | | 3–1 | 3–1 |
| Qatar | 3–1 | 3–0 | 0–3 | 1–3 | | 3–2 |
| San Marino | 3–1 | 3–1 | 1–3 | 1–3 | 2–3 | |

==== Group O ====
| Team | Pld | W | L | GW | GL | Pts |
|---|---|---|---|---|---|---|
| Pakistan | 5 | 5 | 0 | 15 | 0 | 10 |
| South Africa | 5 | 4 | 1 | 12 | 5 | 9 |
| Faroe Islands | 5 | 2 | 3 | 8 | 10 | 7 |
| Jamaica | 5 | 2 | 3 | 7 | 10 | 7 |
| Guernsey | 5 | 2 | 3 | 8 | 10 | 7 |
| Democratic Republic of the Congo | 0 | 0 | 5 | 0 | 15 | 0 |

| | COD | FRO | GGY | JAM | PAK | RSA |
|---|---|---|---|---|---|---|
| Democratic Republic of the Congo | | 0–3 | 0–3 | 0–3 | 0–3 | 0–3 |
| Faroe Islands | 3–0 | | 3–1 | 1–3 | 0–3 | 1–3 |
| Guernsey | 3–0 | 1–3 | | 3–1 | 0–3 | 1–3 |
| Jamaica | 3–0 | 3–1 | 1–3 | | 0–3 | 0–3 |
| Pakistan | 3–0 | 3–0 | 3–0 | 3–0 | | 3–0 |
| South Africa | 3–0 | 3–1 | 3–1 | 3–0 | 0–3 | |

==== Group P ====
| Team | Pld | W | L | GW | GL | Pts |
|---|---|---|---|---|---|---|
| Philippines | 4 | 4 | 0 | 12 | 0 | 8 |
| Turkmenistan | 4 | 3 | 1 | 9 | 5 | 7 |
| Bahrain | 4 | 2 | 2 | 8 | 9 | 6 |
| Barbados | 4 | 1 | 3 | 5 | 10 | 5 |
| Iceland | 4 | 0 | 4 | 2 | 12 | 4 |

| | BHR | BAR | ISL | PHI | TKM |
|---|---|---|---|---|---|
| Bahrain | | 3–2 | 3–1 | 0–3 | 2–3 |
| Barbados | 2–3 | | 3–1 | 0–3 | 0–3 |
| Iceland | 1–3 | 1–3 | | 0–3 | 0–3 |
| Philippines | 3–0 | 3–0 | 3–0 | | 3–0 |
| Turkmenistan | 3–2 | 3–0 | 3–0 | 0–3 | |

=== Knockout stage ===
==== Places 73–84 ====
First Round
Qatar | 3
Turkmenistan | 2
Nepal | 0
Bahrain | 3
Seychelles | 1
South Africa | 3
Syria | 1
Faroe Islands | 3

Second Round
Laos | 3
Qatar | 0
Bahrain | 1
Pakistan | 3
Philippines | 3
South Africa | 0
Faroe Islands | 1
Montenegro | 3

Third Round
Laos | 3
Pakistan | 2
Philippines | 3
Montenegro | 0

Position 73–74
Laos | 0
Philippines | 3

| Position 81–84 | | Position 81 |
| Turkmenistan | 3 |
| Nepal | 1 | Turkmenistan | X |
| Seychelles | 2 | Syria | X |
| Syria | 3 |

==== Places 85–94 ====
First Round
Madagascar | 3
Iceland | 1
Guernsey | 3
Botswana | 0

Second Round
Jamaica | 3
Madagascar | 1
Guernsey | 1
Barbados | 3
Bangladesh | 1
Maldives | 3
Costa Rica | 0
San Marino | 3

Third Round
Jamaica | 0
Barbados | 3
Maldives | 2
San Marino | 3

Position 85
Barbados | X
San Marino | X

| Position 93–94 |
| Iceland | 3 |
| Botswana | 0 |
