= ETTU Cup =

European Table Tennis Union cup

Logo of the ETTU Cup.

The ETTU Cup is the second most important continental tournament for clubs in European table tennis, after the European Champions League. The European Table Tennis Union (ETTU) has organized this cup since the 1964-65 season for men teams, and also for women teams a year later.

== Name ==
The competition was held in the 1964/65 season for the first time for men and a year later for ladies. At that time this tournament was called the European Fair Cities Cup. In 1984 it was renamed ETTU Nancy Evans Cup after the wife of then ITTF President Roy Evans. In 2005, the cup was renamed to the current name, the "ETTU Cup", while "Nancy Evans Cup" became the name of the trophy and is awarded to the winner.

The winner's trophy donated by Hans Frieder Baisch and Klaus stallion.

== Qualification ==
The winners of the ETTU Cup of the previous season qualifies automatically. Furthermore, every member association of ETTU can nominate up to 6 clubs to participate in the competition. Those six clubs should be taking part during the same season in the top national league, and should not be taking part in the European Champions League in the same season.

== Format ==
The competition is organised in three stages:

- first stage: round robin group matches,
- second stage: round robin group matches, and
- third stage: straight knock-out system.

The champions and the runners-up of the previous season, with the six strongest remaining teams ranked by the Ranking Committee, qualify automatically to the last 16. If the champions or the runners-up do not enter the competition, the strongest remaining team would take its place. Eight further top teams according to the ranking list would enter the second round directly.

In the first round, the competition is played in groups of three, four or five teams, with the clubs finishing in positions one and two in every group would qualify for the second round. In the second round the competition is played in groups of four teams. The teams finishing in position one in every group shall qualify for the round of the last sixteen. From this round onwards, a single knock-out system is used with eight teams drawn directly into this round.

The semi-finals and finals will be played in two legs, home and away. If each team has won one leg, the winner would be the team with the better aggregate score first in individual matches, then in games and finally in points. If they are still equal, the winner shall be decided by lot.

== Composition of teams ==
Each team should name at least six players for the competition. Within the list, only two foreign players are allowed, and, for any particular match, only one foreign player is permitted to participate.

== Results ==
Men: https://tt-wiki.info/europe-cup-herren/

Women: https://tt-wiki.info/europe-cup-damen/

=== Men's competition ===
Season	Winners	Runners-up
European Fair Cities Cup
1965	(Germany) DJK Sportbund Stuttgart	(Germany) PSV Stuttgart
1966	(Czechoslovakia) Slavia Prag	(Germany) DJK Sportbund Stuttgart
1967	(Czechoslovakia) Sparta Prag	(Hungary) VM Közert Budapest
1968	(Czechoslovakia) Stadion Prag	(Hungary) VM Közert Budapest
1969	(Hungary) Spartacus Budapest	(Socialist Federal Republic of Yugoslavia) GSTK Vjesnik Zagreb
1970	(Socialist Federal Republic of Yugoslavia) GSTK Vjesnik Zagreb	(Germany) Meidericher TTC
1971	(Czechoslovakia) Vitkovice Ostrava	(Hungary) BVSC Vasutas Budapest
1972	(Socialist Federal Republic of Yugoslavia) GSTK Vjesnik Zagreb	(Hungary) BVSC Vasutas Budapest
1973	(Hungary) BVSC Vasutas Budapest	(France) AC Kremlin-Bicètre
1974	(Hungary) Spartacus Budapest	(Germany) Hertha BSC Berlin
1975	(Hungary) BVSC Vasutas Budapest	(Sweden) Boo KFUM Stockholm
1976	(Hungary) Spartacus Budapest	(Germany) Heinzelmann Reutlingen
1977	(Socialist Federal Republic of Yugoslavia) Spartak Subotica	(Hungary) Ganz Mavag Budapest
1978	(Hungary) BVSC Vasutas Budapest	(Socialist Federal Republic of Yugoslavia) Spartak Subotica
1979	(Hungary) BVSC Vasutas Budapest	(Socialist Federal Republic of Yugoslavia) GSTK Vjesnik Zagreb
1980	(Germany) Heinzelmann Reutlingen	(Socialist Federal Republic of Yugoslavia) GSTK Vjesnik Zagreb
1981	(Socialist Federal Republic of Yugoslavia) Spartak Subotica	(Germany) Saarbrücken
1982	(Germany) Saarbrücken	(France) AS Messine
1983	(Hungary) BVSC Vasutas Budapest	(Germany) Zugbrücke Grenzau
ETTU Nancy Evans Cup
1984	(Italy) TT San Elpidio a Mare	(Germany) Saarbrücken
1985	(Hungary) Spartacus Budapest	(France) La Trinite Sports Nizza (Nice)
1986	(France) La Trinite Sports Nizza (Nice)	(Germany) Borussia Düsseldorf
1987	(Germany) Borussia Düsseldorf	(France) Levallois UTT
1988	(France) Levallois UTT	(Germany) Heinzelmann Reutlingen
1989	(Germany) Saarbrücken	(Germany) Steinhagen
1990	(Germany) indeland Jülich	(Germany) Steinhagen
1991	(Sweden) Falkenbergs	(Germany) indeland Jülich
1992	(Germany) Lübeck	(Sweden) Falkenbergs
1993	(Germany) indeland Jülich	(Hungary) Postas SE Budapest
1994	(Germany) Lübeck	(Germany) indeland Jülich
1995	(Germany) Borussia Düsseldorf	(Germany) Super Donic Berlin
1996	(Germany) Ochsenhausen	(Germany) Maxell Heilbronn-Sontheim
1997	(Germany) Ochsenhausen	(Germany) Zugbrücke Grenzau
1998	(Germany) Zugbrücke Grenzau	(Germany) Bad Honnef
1999	(Germany) indeland Jülich	(Germany) Bad Honnef
2000	(Germany) TTG RS Hoengen	(France) Élan Nevers
2001	(France) Montpellier TT	(France) Élan Nevers
2002	(Germany) Plüderhausen	(France) Élan Nevers
2003	(France) Montpellier TT	(Germany) Metabo Frickenhausen
2004	(France) Levallois SC-TT	(Germany) Borussia Düsseldorf
ETTU Cup
2005	(Germany) Plüderhausen	(Germany) Müller Würzburger Hofbräu
2006	(Germany) Frickenhausen	(Germany) Plüderhausen
2007	(Germany) Borussia Düsseldorf	(Germany) Müller Würzburger Hofbräu
2008	(France) Vaillante Angers TT	(Turkey) Fenerbahçe
2009	(Germany) Plüderhausen	(Russia) Victoria Moscow
2010	(Russia) Gazprom Orenburg	(Germany) Fulda-Maberzell
2011	(France) Chartres	(France) Levallois SC-TT
2012	(Germany) Borussia Düsseldorf	(France) Vaillante Angers TT
2013	(Russia) UMMC Ekaterinburg	(Poland) Dartom Bogoria Grodzisk
2014	(Germany) 1. FC Saarbrücken	(Germany) Ochsenhausen
2015	(Sweden) Eslövs AI	(Poland) Olimpia-Unia Grudziądz
2016	(Austria) Weinviertel Niederösterreich	(Germany) Werder Bremen
2017	(France) Stella Sport La Romagne	(France) Vaillante Angers TT
2018	(Poland) Dekorglass Działdowo	(France) Chartres
2019	(France) GV Hennebont TT	(Germany) FC Saarbrücken
Europe Cup
2021	(France) Pontoise-Cergy	(Austria) Walter Wels
2022	(Italy) Apuania Carrara	(Austria) Wiener Neustadt
2023	(France) GV Hennebont TT	(Poland) Dekorglass Działdowo
2024	(Poland) Dekorglass Działdowo	(Poland) Dartom Bogoria Grodzisk Mazowiecki
2025	(Czech Republic) HB Ostrov	(Czech Republic) SKK El Niňo Praha
2026	(Spain) RC Priego Fundación Kutxabank	(Czech Republic) SKK El Niňo Praha

=== Women's competition ===
Season	Winners	Runners-up
1966	(Germany) SSV Freiburg	(Czechoslovakia) Slavia VS Praha
1967	(Czechoslovakia) Lokomotiva Bratislava	(Hungary) 31. Epitök Budapest
1968	(Hungary) 31. Epitök Budapest	(Czechoslovakia) Slavia VS Praha
1969	(Hungary) 31. Epitök Budapest	(Hungary) FTC Ferencvaros Budapest
1970	(Hungary) 31. Epitök Budapest	(Hungary) BVSC Budapest
1971	(Germany) Kaiserberg	(Hungary) FTC Ferencvaros Budapest
1972	(Hungary) FTC Ferencvaros Budapest	(Germany) Kieler Grün-Weiß
1973	(Hungary) FTC Ferencvaros Budapest	(Germany) Kieler Grün-Weiß
1974	(Hungary) FTC Ferencvaros Budapest	(Germany) Ramsharde-Flensburg
1975	(Hungary) Epitök Budapest	(Czechoslovakia) Start Praha
1976	(Germany) Weiß-Rot-Weiß Kleve	(Netherlands) Delta Lloyd Amsterdam
1977	(Czechoslovakia) Sparta Praha	(Bulgaria) Pochtenetz Sofia
1978	(Socialist Federal Republic of Yugoslavia) Mladost Zagreb	(Netherlands) Delta Lloyd Amsterdam
1979	(Germany) Weiß-Rot-Weiß Kleve	(Socialist Federal Republic of Yugoslavia) Mladost Zagreb
1980	(Czechoslovakia) Vitkovice Ostrava	(Socialist Federal Republic of Yugoslavia) Mladost Zagreb
1981	(Germany) Kaiserberg	(Socialist Federal Republic of Yugoslavia) Industrogradnja
1982	(Hungary) BSE Budapest	(Socialist Federal Republic of Yugoslavia) Industrogradnja
1983	(Hungary) BSE Budapest	(Hungary) Spartacus Budapest
1984	(Hungary) BSE Budapest	(Hungary) Spartacus Budapest
1985	(Hungary) BSE Budapest	(Germany) Saarbrücken
1986	(Netherlands) Avanti Hazerswoude	(Czechoslovakia) Vitkovice Ostrava
1987	(Netherlands) Avanti Hazerswoude	(Czechoslovakia) Spartak Vlasim
1988	(Hungary) BSE Budapest	(Socialist Federal Republic of Yugoslavia) Perucica Foca
1989	(Hungary) BSE Budapest	(Germany) Steinhagen
1990	(Hungary) BSE Budapest	(Hungary) Fövarosi Vizmüvek Budapest
1991	(Germany) Dülmen	(Romania) Ştiinţa Constanţa
1992	(Netherlands) Tempo Team Amsterdam	(Germany) Dülmen
1993	(Germany) Glane	(France) Montpellier TT
1994	(Germany) Klettham-Erding	(Germany) Glane
1995	(Germany) Langweid	(Germany) Bayer 05 Uerdingen
1996	(Germany) Langweid	(Germany) Bayer 05 Uerdingen
1997	(Germany) Klettham-Erding	(Germany) Team Galaxis Lübeck
1998	(Germany) Klettham-Erding	(Germany) Bayer 05 Uerdingen
1999	(Germany) Langweid	(Germany) Bayer 05 Uerdingen
2000	(Hungary) Postás Matáv Budapest	(Germany) Röthenbach/St. Wolfgang
2001	(Germany) Betzingen	(Hungary) Budapest SE
2002	(Germany) 3B Berlin	(Germany) femont Röthenbach
2003	(Hungary) Postás Matáv Budapest	(Germany) Müllermilch Langweid
2004	(Germany) 3B Berlin	(Germany) Busenbach
2005	(Hungary) Postás Matáv Budapest	(Spain) Relesa Galvame Cartagena
2006	(Germany) Homberger	(Germany) 3B Berlin
2007	(Germany) 3B Berlin	(Spain) Fotoprix VIC
2008	(Russia) Dalenergosetproekt Vladivostok	(Poland) SPAR-Zamek Tarnorbrzeg
2009	(Spain) UCAM Cartagena	(Poland) SPAR-Zamek Tarnorbrzeg
2010	(Spain) UCAM Cartagena	(Poland) SPAR-Zamek Tarnorbrzeg
2011	(Netherlands) Li-Ning/Infinity Heerlen	(Germany) Berlin Eastside
2012	(Turkey) Fenerbahçe	(Russia) Dalenergosetproekt Vladivostok
2013	(Turkey) Fenerbahçe	(Poland) SPAR-Zamek Tarnorbrzeg
2014	(Austria) Ströck	(France) CP Lyssois Lille Métropole
2015	(Poland) SPAR-Zamek Tarnorbrzeg	(France) Metz TT
2016	(France) CP Lyssois Lille Métropole	(Turkey) Bursa BB
2017	(Turkey) Bursa BB	(Turkey) Tigem SC Ankara
2018	(France) Metz TT	(Spain) Girbau Vic
2019	(Spain) UCAM Cartagena	(France) CP Lyssois Lille Métropole
Europe Cup
2021	(France) Saint-Denis TT 93	(Hungary) SH-ITB Budaörsi SC
2022	(Spain) UCAM Cartagena	(France) ALCL Grand-Quevilly
2023	(Italy) Quattro Mori Cagliari	(Hungary) SH-ITB Budaörsi SC
2024	(Hungary) SH-ITB Budaörsi SC	(Spain) Museo de la Almendra Francisco Morales
2025	(France) Saint-Denis TT 93	(Czech Republic) SKST PLUS Hodonín
2026	(Austria) Linz AG Froschberg	(Italy) Quattro Mori Cagliari

== See also ==
- European Table Tennis Union
- List of table tennis players
