= 2016 European Table Tennis Championships – Women's doubles =

The women's doubles on 2016 European Table Tennis Championships were held in Budapest, Hungary from 18 to 22 October 2016. Venue for the competition is Tüskecsarnok.

== Results ==
=== Finals ===
Semifinals
5	Dóra Madarász (HUN); Szandra Pergel (HUN)	3
7	Kristin Silbereisen (GER); Sabine Winter (GER)	4
4	Daniela Monteiro Dodean (ROU); Elizabeta Samara (ROU)	3
2	Shan Xiaona (GER); Petrissa Solja (GER)	4

Final
7	Kristin Silbereisen (GER); Sabine Winter (GER)	4
2	Shan Xiaona (GER); Petrissa Solja (GER)	3

=== Top half ===
First round
1	Maria Dolgikh (RUS); Polina Mikhailova (RUS)	4
Ipek Karahan (TUR); Kubra Tan (TUR)	1
Rita Fins (POR); Leila Oliveira (POR)	0
15	Sarah De Nutte (LUX); Ni Xialian (LUX)	4
14	Camelia Iacob (ROU); Bernadette Szőcs (ROU)	4
Dana Čechová (CZE); Renata Štrbíková (CZE)	0
Manca Fajmut (SLO); Tamara Pavčnik (SLO)	0
5	Dóra Madarász (HUN); Szandra Pergel (HUN)	4
7	Kristin Silbereisen (GER); Sabine Winter (GER)	4
Izabela Lupulesku (SRB); Daria Trigolos (BLR)	0
Simeng Deng (AZE); Zhou Chuyi (AZE)	0
11	Galia Dvorak (ESP); Maria Xiao (ESP)	4
9	Alex Galic (SLO); Rachel Moret (SUI)	4
Nathalie Marchetti (BEL); Georgia Zavitsanou (GRE)	1
Karoline Mischek (AUT); Amelie Solja (AUT)	2
3	Katarzyna Grzybowska-Franc (POL); Natalia Partyka (POL)	4

Second round
1	Maria Dolgikh (RUS); Polina Mikhailova (RUS)	1
15	Sarah De Nutte (LUX); Ni Xialian (LUX)	4
14	Camelia Iacob (ROU); Bernadette Szőcs (ROU)	2
5	Dóra Madarász (HUN); Szandra Pergel (HUN)	4
7	Kristin Silbereisen (GER); Sabine Winter (GER)	4
11	Galia Dvorak (ESP); Maria Xiao (ESP)	1
9	Alex Galic (SLO); Rachel Moret (SUI)	4
3	Katarzyna Grzybowska-Franc (POL); Natalia Partyka (POL)	2

Quarterfinals
15	Sarah De Nutte (LUX); Ni Xialian (LUX)	3
5	Dóra Madarász (HUN); Szandra Pergel (HUN)	4
7	Kristin Silbereisen (GER); Sabine Winter (GER)	4
9	Alex Galic (SLO); Rachel Moret (SUI)	1

Semifinals
5	Dóra Madarász (HUN); Szandra Pergel (HUN)	3
7	Kristin Silbereisen (GER); Sabine Winter (GER)	4

=== Bottom half ===
First round
4	Daniela Monteiro Dodean (ROU); Elizabeta Samara (ROU)	4
Petra Lovas (HUN); Eva Ódorová (SVK)	1
Rūta Paškauskienė (LTU); Egle Stuckyte (LTU)	0
10	Shao Jieni (POR); Yu Fu (POR)	4
13	Tetyana Bilenko (UKR); Viktoria Pavlovich (BLR)	2
Sara Ramirez (ESP); Xuan Zhang (ESP)	4
Natalia Bajor (POL); Klaudia Kusińska (POL)	0
6	Yana Noskova (RUS); Yulia Prokhorova (RUS)	4
8	Matilda Ekholm (SWE); Georgina Póta (HUN)	4
Charlotte Carey (WAL); Nicole Trosman (ISR)	0
Linda Bergström (SWE); Jennifer Jonsson (SWE)	1
12	Barbora Balážová (SVK); Hana Matelová (CZE)	4
16	Li Qiangbing (AUT); Sofia Polcanova (AUT)	2
Oceane Guisnel (FRA); Stephanie Loeuillette (FRA)	4
Aneta Maksuti (SRB); Andrea Todorović (SRB)	1
2	Shan Xiaona (GER); Petrissa Solja (GER)	4

Second round
4	Daniela Monteiro Dodean (ROU); Elizabeta Samara (ROU)	4
10	Shao Jieni (POR); Yu Fu (POR)	0
Sara Ramirez (ESP); Xuan Zhang (ESP)	1
6	Yana Noskova (RUS); Yulia Prokhorova (RUS)	4
8	Matilda Ekholm (SWE); Georgina Póta (HUN)	2
12	Barbora Balážová (SVK); Hana Matelová (CZE)	4
Oceane Guisnel (FRA); Stephanie Loeuillette (FRA)	1
2	Shan Xiaona (GER); Petrissa Solja (GER)	4

Quarterfinals
4	Daniela Monteiro Dodean (ROU); Elizabeta Samara (ROU)	4
6	Yana Noskova (RUS); Yulia Prokhorova (RUS)	1
12	Barbora Balážová (SVK); Hana Matelová (CZE)	3
2	Shan Xiaona (GER); Petrissa Solja (GER)	4

Semifinals
4	Daniela Monteiro Dodean (ROU); Elizabeta Samara (ROU)	3
2	Shan Xiaona (GER); Petrissa Solja (GER)	4
