= Meral Yıldız Ali =

Turkish table tennis player

Meral Yıldız
Personal information
- Full name: Meral Yıldız Ali
- Nationality: Turkey Romania
- Born: 23 June 1987 (age 39) Romania
- Height: 1.74 m (5 ft 9 in)

Sport
- Sport: Table tennis
- Playing style: All round player
Medal record
Women's Table tennis
Representing Turkey
ETTU Cup
Silver medal – second place	2008 ETTU Cup	Double

Meral Yıldız Ali (born 23 June 1987 in Romania) is a Romanian-Turkish female table tennis player.

She plays for Fenerbahçe TT since 2007 and also played for Constanta TT in Romania and Eskişehir Anadolu University in Turkey.

== Major achievements ==
- 3 times Turkish Champion
- 1 time Turkish Cup Winner
- 1 time Turkish Super League Champion
- 1 time Balkan Games Champion
- 1 time ETTU Cup Runner-up
