= 2016 European Table Tennis Championships – Women's singles =

The women's singles on 2016 European Table Tennis Championships were held in Budapest, Hungary from 18–23 October 2016. Venue for the competition is Tüskecsarnok.

== Results ==
=== Finals ===
Quarterfinals			Semifinals			Final
1	Han Ying (GER)	2
6	Melek Hu (TUR)	4	6	Melek Hu (TUR)	4
5	Li Jie (NED)	4	5	Li Jie (NED)	0
11	Matilda Ekholm (SWE)	3				6	Melek Hu (TUR)	4
19	Kristin Silbereisen (GER)	2				9	Yu Fu (POR)	1
7	Elizabeta Samara (ROU)	4	7	Elizabeta Samara (ROU)	3
9	Yu Fu (POR)	4	9	Yu Fu (POR)	4
2	Petrissa Solja (GER)	3

== Top half ==
First round
1	Han Ying (GER)	4
Zhang Xuan (ESP)	0
Alex Galic (SLO)	3
17	Shao Jieni (POR)	4
27	Petra Lovas (HUN)	4
Ganna Gaponova (UKR)	0
Linda Bergström (SWE)	0
13	Daniela Monteiro Dodean (ROU)	4
12	Polina Mikhailova (RUS)	4
Mercedes Nagyvaradi (HUN)	0
Sarah De Nutte (LUX)	0
18	Sofia Polcanova (AUT)	4
28	Renata Štrbíková (CZE)	3
Sara Ramirez (ESP)	4
Alina Arlouskaya (BLR)	0
6	Melek Hu (TUR)	4

Second round
1	Han Ying (GER)	4
17	Shao Jieni (POR)	1
27	Petra Lovas (HUN)	2
13	Daniela Monteiro Dodean (ROU)	4
12	Polina Mikhailova (RUS)	4
18	Sofia Polcanova (AUT)	2
Sara Ramirez (ESP)	0
6	Melek Hu (TUR)	4

Third round
1	Han Ying (GER)	4
13	Daniela Monteiro Dodean (ROU)	1
12	Polina Mikhailova (RUS)	2
6	Melek Hu (TUR)	4

Quarterfinals
1	Han Ying (GER)	2
6	Melek Hu (TUR)	4

First round
5	Li Jie (NED)	4
Manca Fajmut (SLO)	0
Szandra Pergel (HUN)	4
26	Natalia Partyka (POL)	1
23	Bernadette Szőcs (ROU)	2
Xiao Maria (ESP)	4
Natalia Bajor (POL)	2
14	Viktoria Pavlovich (BLR)	4
11	Matilda Ekholm (SWE)	4
Leila Oliveira (POR)	0
Rūta Paškauskienė (LTU)	2
31	Eva Ódorová (SVK)	4
30	Yulia Prokhorova (RUS)	4
Li Qiangbing (AUT)	3
Stephanie Loeuillette (FRA)	3
3	Shan Xiaona (GER)	4

Second round
5	Li Jie (NED)	4
Szandra Pergel (HUN)	1
Xiao Maria (ESP)	0
14	Viktoria Pavlovich (BLR)	4
11	Matilda Ekholm (SWE)	4
31	Eva Ódorová (SVK)	1
30	Yulia Prokhorova (RUS)	0
3	Shan Xiaona (GER)	4

Third round
5	Li Jie (NED)	4
14	Viktoria Pavlovich (BLR)	0
11	Matilda Ekholm (SWE)	4
3	Shan Xiaona (GER)	2

Quarterfinals
5	Li Jie (NED)	4
11	Matilda Ekholm (SWE)	3

== Bottom half ==
First round
4	Liu Jia (AUT)	4
Daria Trigolos (BLR)	1
Dana Čechová (CZE)	0
19	Kristin Silbereisen (GER)	4
20	Ni Xialian (LUX)	4
Dóra Madarász (HUN)	2
Klaudia Kusińska (POL)	4
15	Tetyana Bilenko (UKR)	1
16	Sabine Winter (GER)	4
Andrea Pavlovic (CRO)	2
Britt Eerland (NED)	1
24	Yana Noskova (RUS)	4
21	Katarzyna Grzybowska-Franc (POL)	0
Galia Dvorak (ESP)	4
Aneta Maksuti (SRB)	3
7	Elizabeta Samara (ROU)	4

Second round
4	Liu Jia (AUT)	1
19	Kristin Silbereisen (GER)	4
20	Ni Xialian (LUX)	4
Klaudia Kusińska (POL)	3
16	Sabine Winter (GER)	4
24	Yana Noskova (RUS)	1
Galia Dvorak (ESP)	1
7	Elizabeta Samara (ROU)	4

Third round
19	Kristin Silbereisen (GER)	4
20	Ni Xialian (LUX)	3
16	Sabine Winter (GER)	1
7	Elizabeta Samara (ROU)	4

Quarterfinals
19	Kristin Silbereisen (GER)	2
7	Elizabeta Samara (ROU)	4

First round
8	Georgina Póta (HUN)	4
Tin-Tin Ho (ENG)	3
Irina Ciobanu (ROU)	4
32	Amelie Solja (AUT)	2
29	Hana Matelová (CZE)	4
Rachel Moret (SUI)	1
Maria Malanina (RUS)	0
9	Yu Fu (POR)	4
10	Li Fen (SWE)	4
Mateja Jeger (CRO)	0
Camelia Iacob (ROU)	2
25	Maria Dolgikh (RUS)	4
22	Barbora Balážová (SVK)	4
Andrea Todorović (SRB)	3
Oceane Guisnel (FRA)	1
2	Petrissa Solja (GER)	4

Second round
8	Georgina Póta (HUN)	4
Irina Ciobanu (ROU)	0
29	Hana Matelová (CZE)	3
9	Yu Fu (POR)	4
10	Li Fen (SWE)	3
25	Maria Dolgikh (RUS)	4
22	Barbora Balážová (SVK)	0
2	Petrissa Solja (GER)	4

Third round
8	Georgina Póta (HUN)	3
9	Yu Fu (POR)	4
25	Maria Dolgikh (RUS)	0
2	Petrissa Solja (GER)	4

Quarterfinals
9	Yu Fu (POR)	4
2	Petrissa Solja (GER)	3
