= Eslövs BK =

Swedish football club

- Full name: Eslövs Bollklubb
- Founded: 1969
- Ground: Ekevalla, Eslöv
- Chairman: Stefan Sandell
- Head coach: Peter Olsson
- League: Division 2 Västra Götaland
- 2019: Division 2 Västra Götaland, 11th
Home colours

Eslövs BK is a Swedish football club located in Eslöv.

They play their home matches at Ekevalla in Eslöv and is affiliated to Skånes Fotbollförbund.

== Background ==
Eslövs Bollklubb were formed in 1969 following the merger of Eslövs AI and Eslövs IK. Eslövs AI were founded in 1908 and were the dominant club until the 1940s. Eslövs IK were formed in 1932 and in later years were the more successful of the Eslöv clubs.

Eslövs BK played in the 2006 Svenska Cupen and beat Tvååkers IF 4–2 in the first round before losing 0–1 at home to Assyriska Föreningen in the second round.

Eslövs BK currently plays in Division 2 Västra Götaland which is the fourth tier of Swedish football.

== Season to season ==
| Season | Level | Division | Section | Position | Movements |
|---|---|---|---|---|---|
| 1993 | Tier 5 | Division 4 | Skåne Nordvästra | 6th | |
| 1994 | Tier 5 | Division 4 | Skåne Sydvästra | 3rd | Priomotion Playoffs |
| 1995 | Tier 5 | Division 4 | Skåne Nordvästra | 7th | |
| 1996 | Tier 5 | Division 4 | Skåne Nordvästra | 7th | |
| 1997 | Tier 5 | Division 4 | Skåne Nordvästra | 5th | |
| 1998 | Tier 5 | Division 4 | Skåne Nordvästra | 1st | Promoted |
| 1999 | Tier 4 | Division 3 | Södra Götaland | 7th | |
| 2000 | Tier 4 | Division 3 | Södra Götaland | 9th | Relegation Playoffs |
| 2001 | Tier 4 | Division 3 | Södra Götaland | 9th | Relegation Playoffs – Relegated |
| 2002 | Tier 5 | Division 4 | Skåne Västra | 3rd | Promotion Playoffs – Promoted |
| 2003 | Tier 4 | Division 3 | Södra Götaland | 6th | |
| 2004 | Tier 4 | Division 3 | Södra Götaland | 12th | Relegated |
| 2005 | Tier 5 | Division 4 | Skåne Västra | 4th | |
| 2006* | Tier 6 | Division 4 | Skåne Västra | 1st | Promoted |
| 2007 | Tier 5 | Division 3 | Södra Götaland | 3rd | |
| 2008 | Tier 5 | Division 3 | Södra Götaland | 3rd | |
| 2009 | Tier 5 | Division 3 | Södra Götaland | 4th | |
| 2010 | Tier 5 | Division 3 | Södra Götaland | 10th | Relegated |
| 2011 | Tier 6 | Division 4 | Skåne Nordvästra | 6th | |
| 2012 | Tier 6 | Division 4 | Skåne Nordvästra | 4th | |
| 2013 | Tier 6 | Division 4 | Skåne västra | 3rd | |

* League restructuring in 2006 resulted in a new division being created at Tier 3 and subsequent divisions dropping a level.
