= Adrien Mattenet =

French table tennis player

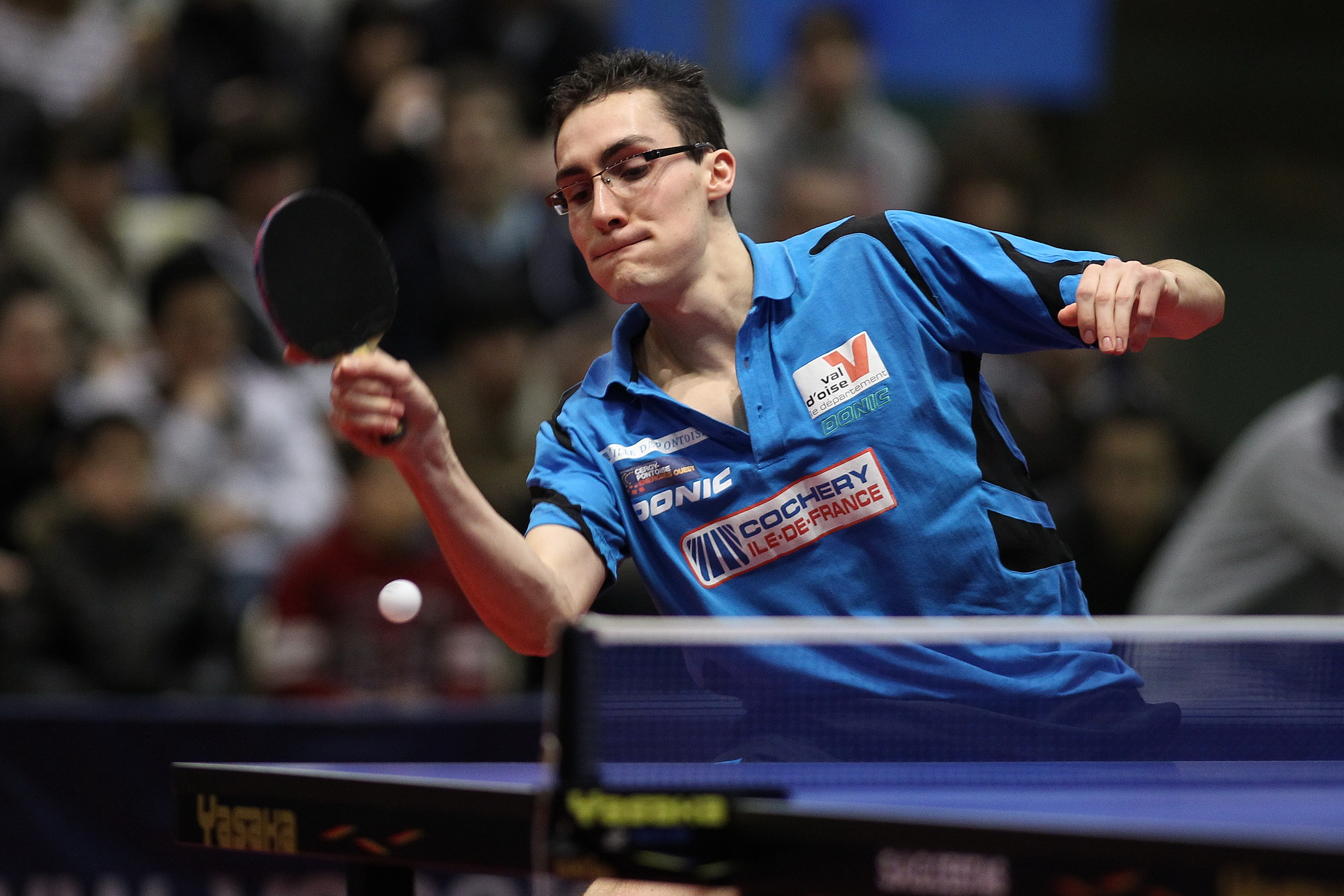
- Mattenet in 2011

Personal information
- Full name: Adrien Mattenet
- Nationality: France
- Born: 15 October 1987 (age 38) Eaubonne, France
- Height: 1.87 m (6 ft 2 in)
- Weight: 73 kg (161 lb; 11.5 st)

Sport
- Sport: Table tennis
- Club: AS Pontoise-Cergy TT
- Playing style: Shakehand
- Highest ranking: 19 (December 2011)
Medal record
Men's table tennis
Representing France
European Games
Silver medal – second place	2015 Baku	Team
European Championships
Bronze medal – third place	2010 Ostrava	Team
Mediterranean Games
Gold medal – first place	2009 Pescara	Team

Adrien Mattenet (born 15 October 1987) is a French table tennis player, currently playing for AS Pontoise-Cergy TT. His World Ranking is at number 19 as of December 2011, the best ranking for a French player since Christophe Legout in 2001.

In May 2011, Mattenet was the first Frenchman to qualify for the London 2012 Olympic Games by beating Singapore's Gao Ning to reach the Quarterfinals of the 2011 World Championships. At the 2012 Olympics, he lost to Chen Weixing in the fourth round. In June 2015, he competed in the inaugural European Games, for France in table tennis, more specifically, Men's team with Simon Gauzy and Emmanuel Lebesson. He earned a silver medal.

== See also ==
- List of table tennis players
