= Wang Mengli =

Chinese table tennis player

Personal information
- Nationality: China
- Born: July 28, 1989 (age 37) China
- Height: 1.65 m (5 ft 5 in)

Sport
- Sport: Table tennis
- Playing style: All round player

Wang Mengli (born July 28, 1989 in China) is a female Chinese table tennis player. She has played for Fenerbahçe TT since 2009 and also played for Lu Neng China in China.
