= European Club Cup of Champions =

European table tennis competition

The European Club Cup of Champions, often known as the European Cup or ECCC, was a table tennis competition for European club teams. It was organized by the European Table Tennis Union (ETTU) annually for men's and women's teams. It was first held in session 1960/61 for the men's competition, and the women's competition three years later. However, the competition was replaced by the present European Champions League for the men's and women's competition in session 2001/02 and 2005/06 respectively.

== Format ==
The competition was contested by the current national champion team of ETTU member associations of each season. In the 1960/61 season, the first competition for men was held and three years later there was also the women's competition. Since 1994/95, the "best of three" format was replaced, rather the new format that if a team won both the home and away match then it won the game. If each team won for a match, then a decision game would be played.

In the session 1998/99, a new competition of different format, named "European Champions League", was held for the men's competition. The success of the Champions League called for the discontinuation of the Men's European Cup in 2001/02, after three years' co-existence, and ultimately replaced the women's competition as well in session 2005/06.

== Results ==
In the early years, the competitions were mostly dominated by the Eastern European teams, in the men's competition until the late 1970s, and in the ladies - especially by the Hungarian club Statisztika Budapest - by the end of the 1980s. This led to the promotion of table tennis in the Eastern Europe, where players had the best training facilities and good coaches available. Later on, Western European teams won more frequently, especially the German teams. This shift is owing to the growing professionalization in the sports and the sponsorship obtained in those countries, thus attracting some top foreign players playing for the Western European clubs.

Men full results: https://tt-wiki.info/champions-league-herren/

Women full results: https://tt-wiki.info/champions-league-damen/

=== List of Winners of the Men's Competition (1961-2001) ===
  - 1961 - (Romania) CSM Cluj
  - 1962 - (Socialist Federal Republic of Yugoslavia) GSTK Zagreb
  - 1963 - (Hungary) BVSC
  - 1964 - (Romania) CSM Cluj
  - 1965 - (Romania) CSM Cluj
  - 1966 - (Romania) CSM Cluj
  - 1967 - (Romania) CSM Cluj
  - 1968 - (Czechoslovakia) Slavia Prague
  - 1969 - (Czechoslovakia) Slavia Prague
  - 1970 - (Hungary) Spartacus Budapest
  - 1971 - (Hungary) Spartacus Budapest
  - 1972 - (England) Ormesby TTC
  - 1973 - (Socialist Federal Republic of Yugoslavia) GSTK Zagreb
  - 1974 - (Socialist Federal Republic of Yugoslavia) GSTK Zagreb
  - 1975 - (Czechoslovakia) Sparta Prague
  - 1976 - (Socialist Federal Republic of Yugoslavia) GSTK Zagreb
  - 1977 - (Czechoslovakia) Sparta Prague
  - 1978 - (Czechoslovakia) Sparta Prague
  - 1979 - (Hungary) Spartacus Budapest
  - 1980 - (Hungary) BVSC
  - 1981 - (Hungary) Spartacus Budapest
  - 1982 - (Germany) Heinzelmann Reutlingen
  - 1983 - (Germany) Heinzelmann Reutlingen
  - 1984 - (Germany) Simex Jülich
  - 1985 - (Poland) AZS Gdansk
  - 1986 - (Germany) ATSV Saarbrücken
  - 1987 - (Germany) Zugbrücke Grenzau
  - 1988 - (Germany) Zugbrücke Grenzau
  - 1989 - (Germany) Borussia Düsseldorf
  - 1990 - (France) UTT Levallois
  - 1991 - (Germany) Borussia Düsseldorf
  - 1992 - (Germany) Borussia Düsseldorf
  - 1993 - (Germany) Borussia Düsseldorf
  - 1994 - (Belgium) Sporting Villette Charleroi
  - 1995 - (France) UTT Levallois
  - 1996 - (Belgium) Sporting Villette Charleroi
  - 1997 - (Germany) Borussia Düsseldorf
  - 1998 - (Germany) Borussia Düsseldorf
  - 1999 - (Austria) TTV Hornstein
  - 2000 - (Germany) Zugbrücke Grenzau
  - 2001 - (Croatia) Večernji Zagreb

=== List of Winners of the Women's Competition (1964-2005) ===
  - 1964 - (Romania) Vointa Arad
  - 1965 - (Romania) Vointa Arad
  - 1966 - (Germany) DTC Kaiserberg
  - 1967 - (Romania) Progresul Bucharest
  - 1968 - (Germany) BSG Aussenhandel
  - 1969 - (Germany) BSG Aussenhandel
  - 1970 - (Hungary) Statisztika Budapest
  - 1971 - (Hungary) Statisztika Budapest
  - 1972 - (Hungary) Statisztika Budapest
  - 1973 - (Hungary) Statisztika Budapest
  - 1974 - (Hungary) Statisztika Budapest
  - 1975 - (Czechoslovakia) Sparte Prague
  - 1976 - (Hungary) Statisztika Budapest
  - 1977 - (Hungary) Statisztika Budapest
  - 1978 - (Hungary) Statisztika Budapest
  - 1979 - (Hungary) Statisztika Budapest
  - 1980 - (Hungary) Statisztika Budapest
  - 1981 - (Hungary) Statisztika Budapest
  - 1982 - (Hungary) Statisztika Budapest
  - 1983 - (Hungary) Statisztika Budapest
  - 1984 - (Hungary) Statisztika Budapest
  - 1985 - (Hungary) Statisztika Budapest
  - 1986 - (Hungary) Statisztika Budapest
  - 1987 - (Netherlands) Avanti Hazersvoude
  - 1988 - (Czechoslovakia) Spartak Vlasim
  - 1989 - (Hungary) Statisztika Budapest
  - 1990 - (Hungary) Statisztika Budapest
  - 1991 - (Hungary) Statisztika Budapest
  - 1992 - (Germany) SPVG Steinhagen
  - 1993 - (Germany) SPVG Steinhagen
  - 1994 - (Hungary) Statisztika Budapest
  - 1995 - (Hungary) Statisztika Budapest
  - 1996 - (Hungary) Statisztika Budapest
  - 1997 - (Germany) FC Langweid
  - 1998 - (Germany) Team Galaxis Lübeck
  - 1999 - (Hungary) Statisztika Budapest
  - 2000 - (Hungary) Statisztika Budapest
  - 2001 - (Hungary) Statisztika Budapest
  - 2002 - (Netherlands) Henk ten Hoor DTK
  - 2003 - (Germany) FSV Kropach
  - 2004 - (Germany) Müllermilch Langweid
  - 2005 - (Germany) Müllermilch Langweid
