= La Villette Charleroi =

Belgian table tennis club

- Sport: Table tennis
- Founded: 1930
- Based in: Charleroi
- Location: Belgium
- President: Michel Beirens

Royal Villette Charleroi is a Belgian table tennis club in Charleroi.

It is the second most successful club in the European Champions League with 5 European titles and 4-second-place finishes.
