= TTC Berlin Eastside =

Table tennis club in Berlin, Germany

TTC Berlin Eastside e.V.
- Full name: Tischtennisclub Berlin Eastside e.V.
- League: Bundesliga
- Based in: Berlin, Germany
- Arena: Freizeitforum Marzahn
- President: Alexander Teichmann
- Head coach: Irina Palina
- Members: 300
- Website: Official website

TTC Berlin Eastside e.V. is a table tennis club based in the German capital Berlin. It is best known for its women's elite team, which is one of the strongest in Europe and won the ETTU Champions League both in 2012 and 2014. Additionally, it is a three time ETTU Cup winner, having obtained the title in 2002, 2004 and 2007. Besides, the club also has teams in lower leagues in both genders.

== Team ==
=== Roster ===
Roster for the 2013–2014 season

- (Germany) Irene Ivancan
- (Hungary) Georgina Póta
- (Germany) Kristin Silbereisen
- (Germany) Shan Xiaona

=== Staff members ===
- (Germany) President: Alexander Teichmann
- (Germany) Team Manager: Tanja Krämer
- (Russia) Coach: Irina Palina
- (Germany) Treasurer: Jürgen Heinrich
- (Germany) Press Officer: Alexander Teichmann

== Honors ==
- ETTU Champions League:
  - Winner: 2012, 2014, 2016, 2017, 2021, 2025
- ETTU Cup:
  - Winner: 2002, 2004, 2007
