= Chartres ASTT =

French table tennis club

- Full name: Association Sportive de Tennis de Table de Chartres
- Founded: 2003
- League: Pro A
- Based in: Chartres, France
- Arena: Complexe Sportif Rosskopf
- Colors
- President: Loïc Bréhu
- Head coach: Calin Toma
- Members: 260
- Website: Official website

Association Sportive de Tennis de Table de Chartres is a table tennis club based in Chartres, France. One of the best teams in the country in the recent years, it won the French top division Pro A both in 2012 and 2013. Chartres also has respectable results in continental competitions, having won the ETTU Cup in 2011 and finishing runner-up in the European Champions League in 2013.

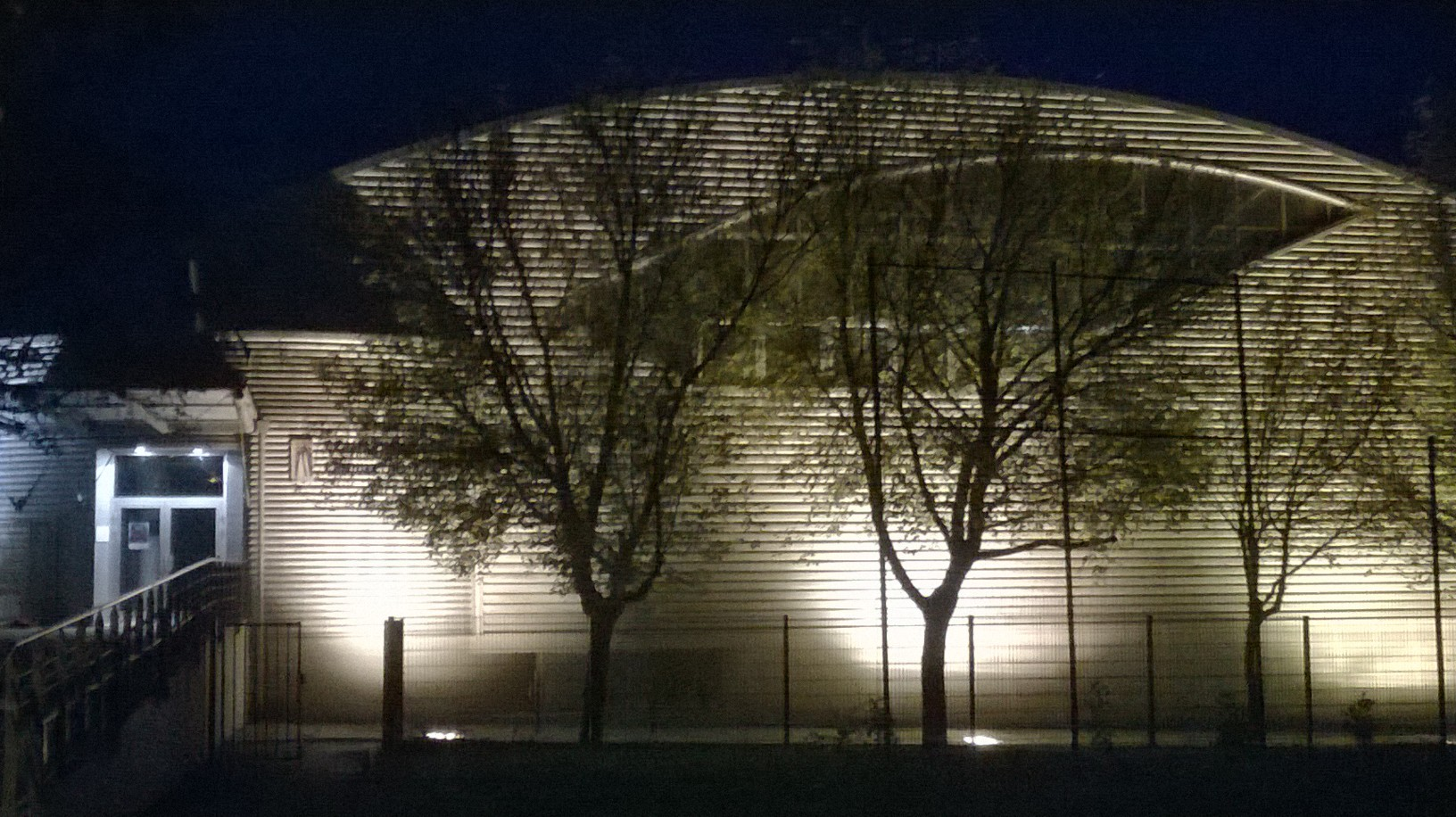
Complexe Rosskopf - Chartres

== Honours ==
- Pro A:
  - Winner: 2012, 2013
- ETTU Cup:
  - Winner: 2011
- European Champions League:
  - Runner-up: 2013

== Team ==
=== Roster ===
- (France) Damien Éloi
- (Austria) Robert Gardos
- (Sweden) Pär Gerell
- (Portugal) João Monteiro
- (Singapore) Gao Ning

=== Staff members ===
- (France) Club President: Loïc Bréhu
- (France) Treasurer: Jacques Maupu
- (France) Coach: Calin Toma
