= Eslöv =

Eslöv, Sweden
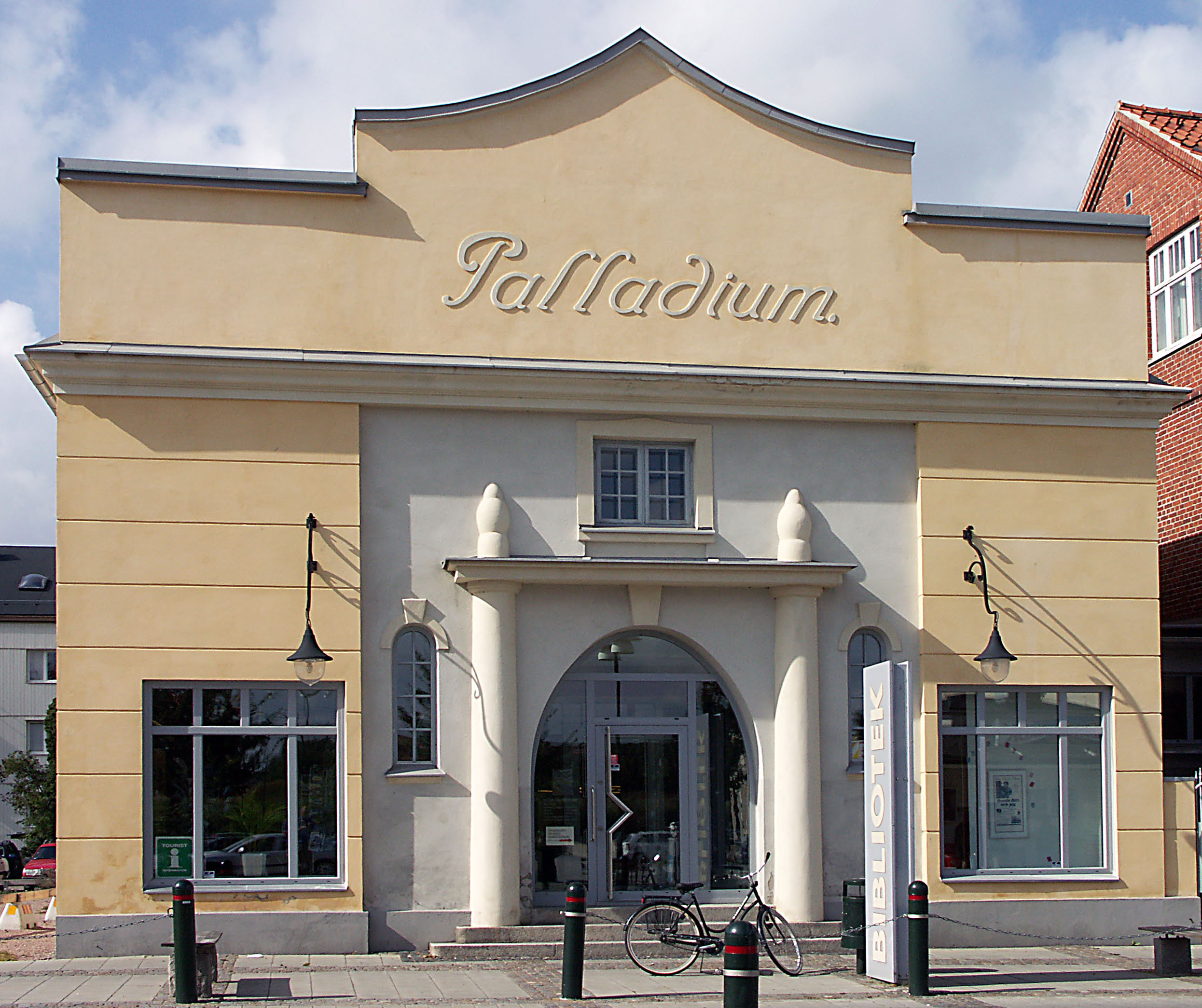
- Eslöv Municipal Library

- Coat of arms

- Location within Skåne Location within Sweden
- Coordinates: 55°50′21″N 13°18′14″E
- Country: Sweden
- Province: Skåne
- County: Skåne County
- Municipality: Eslöv Municipality
- Founded: 1911

Area
  - Total: 9.14 km^{2} (3.53 sq mi)
- Elevation: 68 m (223 ft)

Population (31 December 2018)
  - Total: 17,748
  - Density: 1,942/km^{2} (5,030/sq mi)
- Time zone: UTC+1 (CET)
  - Summer (DST): UTC+2 (CEST)
- Postal code: 241 xx
- Area code: (+46) 413
- Website: Official website

Eslöv (Swedish pronunciation: [ˈěːslœv];) is a town and the seat of Eslöv Municipality, Skåne County, Sweden with 19,598 inhabitants as of 2018.

Eslöv is part of the Öresund Region, and the Malmö Metropolitan Area.

== History ==
According to a map from 1717, Eslöv village was originally located in the current crossing Västergatan-Remmarlövsvägen.

When the Southern Main Line, already passing through cities such as Stockholm and Malmö, was built through Eslöv the town's growth took off. On 4 October 1858 the first trains rolled on the Southern Main Line through Eslöv. On 1 July 1865 the railway from Eslöv to Landskrona and Helsingborg (see Rååbanan) was taken into use and on 1 May 1866 the railway opened to Ystad. Eslöv had become a significant railroad link, and trade to and from the resort increased significantly. In 1897, Eslöv-Hörby railway opened, which was later extended to Kristianstad. In 1898, the railway Eslöv-Röstånga was taken into use, which was later extended to Klippan.

=== Healthcare ===
In 1865, Eslöv gets its first doctor, Walter Ström. In 1870, Eslöv's first pharmacy opens. In 1942, a dental clinic and a provisional child care center are established. In 1969, the Tåbelund emergency medical center, "The triple doctor station", opens and in 1985, the health center Kärråkra is established.

=== Water, gas and electricity ===
In 1884, the first telephone lines were planted in Eslöv and at the end of the year, there were 30 subscribers. In 1905, the water tower at Kvarngatan, the waterworks at Villavägen and the gas plant at Gasverksgatan were ready for use. The gas plant was discontinued in the late 1950s and the buildings were demolished in 1962. In 1968, the new water tower on Fäladen was taken into operation and thus replaced the old water tower.

AB Sydvatten was founded in 1966 by the cities of Malmö, Helsingborg, Lund, Landskrona and Eslöv. Subsequently, the municipalities of Burlöv, Höganäs, Kävlinge, Lomma, Staffanstorp, Svalöv, Svedala and Vellinge have also joined. The Bolmen tunnel began being built in 1975 for it to be put into use in October 1987. The water runs from Lake Bolmen in Småland via an 8 mile long tunnel to Perstorp and then into a 2.5 mile long raw water pipeline to Ringsjöverket in Stehag where it is purified.

In 1909, a treatment plant was built on the peat bog in the south, the current Edelbergsparken. The same year, the City Council appointed a committee with the task of looking more closely at the electricity issue and in 1911 the first transformer station was ready. In the 1920s, the gas lamps in Eslöv were changed to electric lighting. A new treatment plant was ready in Ellinge in 1937 and a new main transformer station was commissioned in 1952.

In 1920, the first fire engine was purchased for Eslöv. In 1925, the fire brigade was replaced by Eslöv's first professional fire service. In 1985, district heating was built in Eslöv.

=== Administrative belongings ===
Eslöv was a village in the Sallerup's parish which, after the municipal reform in 1862, belonged to Sallerup's country municipality.

In 1875, part of the county municipality was broken out and Eslöv's "köping" (market town) was formed, where most of the town's buildings were included. On 17 August 1894 Västra Sallerup's municipal community was established in the county municipality for settlement outside the köping area. Eslöv's purchase accounted for 56.36 hectares and was roughly limited by Repslagaregatan, Trulsagatan (current Västerlånggatan), Trehäradsvägen, Köpingskolan (current eastern school) and Köpingsparken (current Badhusparken) In 1909, Eslöv grew by incorporating the area Västra Sallerup's municipal community with Eslöv's köping. On January 1, 1811, Eslöv received city rights. In 1912 Eslöv's city was expanded again by incorporating Ellinge Sjöhus, belonging to Borlunda parish. In 1940, the built-up parts, 150 hectares, were incorporated by western Sallerups county municipality. In 1952, the city's area grew from 7 to 30 km^{2} when the remaining parts, 1,960 hectares, were incorporated from Västra Sallerup's county municipality, as well as 193 hectares from Trollenäs land municipality / Socken and 226.5 hectares from Borlunda county municipality after which. In 1967 and 1969, further extensions were made before the municipality of Eslöv in 1971 became a seat.

Eslöv belonged to Västra Sallerups congregation, which in 1952 was converted to the Eslöv parish.

The town belonged to Harjager's district court until 1874, thereafter it belonged to in Rönneberg's, Onsjö and Harjager's district court until 1916 then, until 1948, it belonged to Eslöv's district court in Frosta and Eslöv's court case. From 1948 to 1971, the town of Frosta and Eslöv's court of law was incorporated, which in 1971 was converted to Eslöv's court case, which in 2002 went up in Lund's court case.

Eslöv Airport (ESME), a local airstrip, was originally used for mail transport, but was also used for military training during World War II. Now it is mostly used by private pilots and parachutists.

== Industry and enterprise ==
=== Banking ===
In 1866, Eslöv's Savings Bank was founded mainly thanks to Dr Walter Ström and post-exporter Carl Håkansson. The bank's first working day was 27 October that year. Onsjö Härads Sparbank was founded on 18 July 1861 at Trollenäs Castle where activities existed for 25 years. The branch office was opened after a few years in Marieholm, where the head office moved in 1890. A branch office was opened in Eslöv in 1902. Eslöv's Savings Bank and Onsjö Härads Sparbank merged under the name Eslöv Onsjö Sparbank which was later merged with Lundabygdens Sparbank and formed Sparbanken Finn.

=== Businesses ===
- Dr Pers Food AB
- Orkla Foods Sweden (formerly AB Felix)
- Saint-Gobain Sekurit AB (formerly Trempex)
- Smurfit Kappa Sverige AB (formerly AB Skånewell and then Förenade Well AB)
- Cygrids Communications AB (Formerly Cybercom & YT AB)

=== Industrial history ===
Grain trading took place early at the station, which was popularly known as Eslöv's börs (stock exchange). In the 1870s, there were, among other things, two breweries, a horse slaughterhouse, six bread bakeries and several bookbinders, lathes, thin-binders and stonemasons in Eslöv. However, only four industrial companies were officially registered in the town; Rencks Yllefabrik, Ljungberg's foundry, A. J. Wahlgren's tannery and Ättiksfabriken. Together, they employed some forty employees.

=== Grain and wood products ===
In 1865 Carl Engström started a company, named after himself, that grew into one of southern Sweden's largest in cereals, seeds, fodder and agricultural machinery. In 1913, the company was converted into a limited liability company.

In 1868, a logger, Nils Johnson, founded the movement that later became AB Nils Johnson & Co. In the beginning, flour and feed products dominated, but later came also a joinery factory, a garden, planing, glassworks and more. When Nils Johnson died in 1907, his son Johannes Johnson took over the company and developed it into one of the more important in the wood products industry. In 1929, the company became a limited company. The company became Moberg & Co and is today known as Optimera.

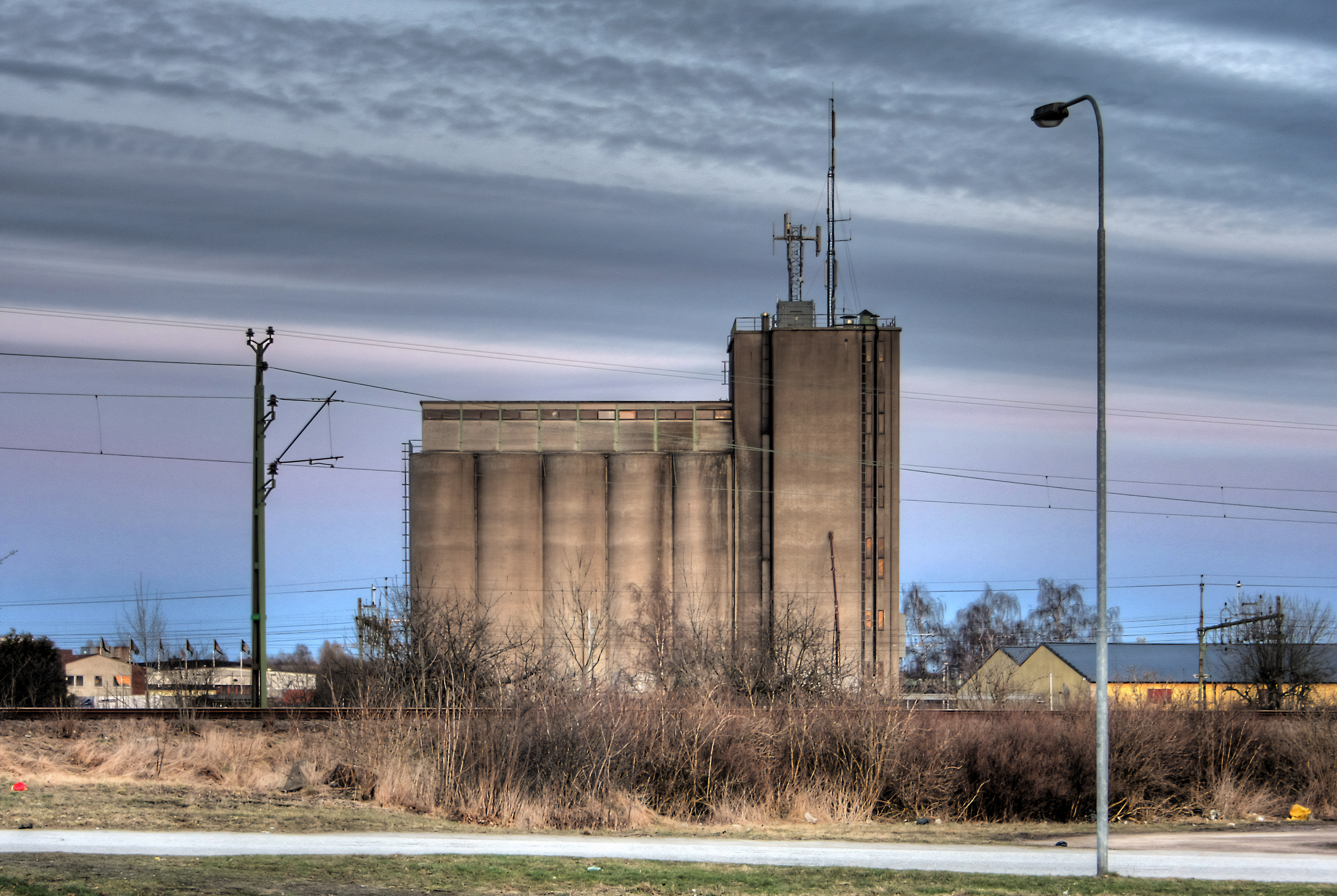
A silo constructed next to the silo in Eslöv.

=== Textile Industry ===
Klädesfabriken, mentioned in the health care protocol for 1878, is Renck's wool factory, Eslöv's first real industry, which was started in 1869 by the two German immigrants Ferdinand Renck (1821–1886) and Johan Renck (1845–1895; father of Lorentz Renck). There was a charity, spinning mill and a clothing factory where, among other things, Eslöv's felt plaids were manufactured. The factory, which was completely destroyed in a fire in 1898, was located at Joel Sallius park in front of Medborgarhuset. In 1879 Carl Peter Sahlin started a coloring movement in Eslöv. In 1880 he bought the old dairy premises opposite the plantation Trekanten. The movement was expanded with the addition of spinning and weaving. The son Albert Sahlin (1868-1936) then founded Sahlins Konfektion AB, which was especially known for the manufacturing of children's clothing. Sahlin's clothing, which was located at Malmgatan between Västerlånggatan and Kanalgatan (current HN Furniture), was closed in 1973.

In 1905, Eslövs Yllefabrik was founded by Carl Herrman. In 1898 Herrman, together with his colleague Jöns Hansson from Malmö Yllefabriks AB, founded Marieholms Yllefabriks AB. Eslöv's Yllefabrik, which was located on Gasverksgatan opposite the present East School's gymnasium, was for a long time the only textile factory in Sweden that had machines for printing colors on the fabric. In 1929, the company was converted into a limited liability company. In 1935, the factory received the country's first ring spinning machine. In 1955, the company was taken over by Manufaktur AB in Malmö with the subsidiary Malmö Yllefabriks AB. The factory in Eslöv was closed at year-end 1958/1959. In 1939 Erik Wedberg founded the company, La Reine, with manufacturing in various places in the city. In 1963 a factory was built at Trehäradsvägen just east of the railway. Manufacturing consisted of, among other things, coats and nylon rainwear.

=== Metal ===
The foundry mentioned in the health care protocol for 1878 is Ljungbergska Foundry. In 1872 Nils Håkansson started a forging workshop in Eslöv which he sold in 1878 to manufacturer J Ljungberg and the name changed to Ljungbergska Gjuteriet. In 1889, Lars Åkerman, who was previously a co-owner of Hvilans Mekaniska Verkstad in Kristianstad, bought the company and named it Åkermans Gjuteri and Mekaniska Verkstad. Åkerman died in 1897 and the following year the company was converted to Aktiebolaget Åkermans Gjuteri and Mekaniska Verkstad. During the 1920s, road rollers and graders were manufactured. In 1938, Åkermans moved from central Eslöv, where Medborgarhuset is today, to premises on Bruksgatan in eastern Eslöv. From 1939, Åkermans began producing excavators, the product that made the company internationally known. The first excavator, an Åkerman 300, was delivered to Sjöbo Cementgjuteri. In December 1965 Åkermans was introduced to the stock exchange. On 1 December 1998, Volvo Excavator (formerly Åkermans) announced that it was planning to shut down its production of excavators in Eslöv and thus a successful epoch of Eslöv's industrial history in the grave.

== Notability ==
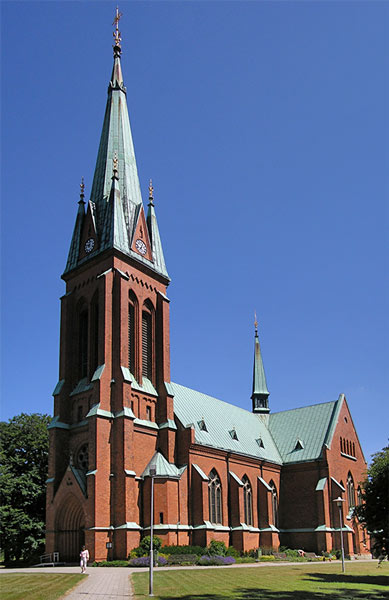
Eslöv church, built 1890 in Neo-Gothic. This style became known as Eslöv Gothic in Sweden.

Sweden's tallest wooden house, Lagerhuset, is located in the city. In 2007, a large-scale renovation of the building took place and it was converted into an apartment complex. The building was originally built as a grain silo for cereal during World War I.

The medicine Salubrin was invented in Eslöv. Several other big companies also have their main offices in the town.

The Swedish comedian Johan Glans was born and raised in Eslöv.

Swedish professional golfer Ludvig Åberg was born and raised in Eslöv.

== Sports ==
The following sports clubs are located in Eslöv:

- Eslövs AI – has won national championships in table tennis and wrestling.
- Eslövs BK

The Eslövs Motorstadion existed from 1948 to 1961. It was built by Motorklubben Gnistan and mainly used for motorcycle speedway. It staged a qualifying round of the Speedway World Championship in 1953.
