= Falkenbergs BTK =

Swedish sports club

- Full name: Falkenberg bordtennisklubb
- Sport: table tennis
- Founded: 30 November 1925
- Based in: Falkenberg, Sweden
- Arena: Falkhallen

Falkenbergs Bordtennisklubb (Falkenberg Table Tennis Club) is a Swedish table tennis club formed on November 30, 1925.

The club played its first season in the top league (Allsvenskan) in 1951 and has over the years won ten national Swedish team championships (1963, 1964, 1971, 1972, 1976, 1979, 1980, 1981, 1986 and 1988) and one European championship.

Several world class players has represented the club, including Stellan Bengtsson, Ulf "Tickan" Carlsson, Jörgen Persson and Peter Karlsson
