= AS Pontoise-Cergy TT =

- Full name: Association sportive de Pontoise-Cergy Tennis de table
- Founded: 1927
- League: Pro A
- Based in: Pontoise, France
- Arena: Hall Omnisports Philippe Hémet
- Colors
- President: Louise Adam
- Head coach: Peter Franz
- Members: 250
- Website: Official website

Association sportive de Pontoise-Cergy Tennis de table (commonly abbreviated AS Pontoise-Cergy TT or simply ASPCTT) is a table tennis club based in Pontoise, France. One of the top clubs in the country, it finished runner-up in the French top division Pro A three times (2009, 2010, 2013) and also reached the final of the European Champions League, the premier continental competition in Europe in 2014.

== Honors ==
- Pro A:
  - Runner-up: 2009, 2010, 2013
- European Champions League:
  - Winner: 2014
  - Semifinalist: 2013
  - Quarterfinalist: 2007, 2012
- ETTU Cup:
  - Quarterfinalist: 2006, 2011

== Team ==
=== Roster ===
Roster for the 2013–14 season

- (France) Tristan Flore
- (Portugal) Marcos Freitas
- (Sweden) Kristian Karlsson
- (China) Jiang Jun Wang

=== Staff members ===
- (France) President: Louise Adam
- (France) Team Manager: Christian Adam
- (Germany) Coach: Peter Franz
- (France) Treasurer: Ludovic Benoit
- (France) Press Officer: Guillaume Adam
