= Fenerbahçe S.K. (table tennis) =

Fenerbahçe Table Tennis
- Full name: Fenerbahçe Sports Club Table Tennis Section
- Nickname: Sarı Lacivertliler (English: The Yellow-Navy Blues)
- Short name: Fenerbahçe Table Tennis
- Founded: 1928; 98 years ago
- Ground: Dereağzı Facilities, Istanbul, Turkey
- Chairman: Aziz Yıldırım
- Manager: Chia Yu Lin
- League: Turkish Men's Table Tennis League; Turkish Women's Table Tennis League
- 2022-23: 5 (Men); Champions (Women)
- Website: https://www.fenerbahce.org/branslar/masa-tenisi/

Fenerbahçe Table Tennis is the men's and women's table tennis department of Fenerbahçe S.K., a major Turkish multi-sport club based in Istanbul, Turkey. The table tennis section of Fenerbahçe, which was founded in 1928, is the most successful in Turkey and one of the best in Europe, with the men's team having won the Turkish Super League 4 times and the Turkish Cup 11 times, among others. They were also ETTU Cup runners-up in the 2007–08 season, the best achievement for any Turkish team in European competitions so far. In the 2009–10 season they also reached the quarter-finals.

The women's team reached the European Champions League final in two consecutive seasons, in 2013–14 and 2014–15, being the first and only Turkish club that ever played in a Champions League Final, and they eventually won the Champions League title in 2015, thus achieving the first and only Triple Crown ever for a Turkish team. Furthermore, the second-tier ETTU Cup was won two times in a row, in 2011–12 and 2012–13, which is also a Turkish record. Throughout the years they dominated Turkish table tennis by winning the Turkish Super League a record 12 times and a record 13 Turkish Cups, among others.

Fenerbahçe Table Tennis players used to train in the Dereağzı Facilities. The teams play their home games in the Ülker Sports Arena with a capacity of 12,500, which opened in 2012.

== Honours (Men) ==
=== European competitions ===
- ETTU Cup
  - Runners-up (1): 2007–08
  - Quarter-finalist (1): 2009-10

=== National competitions ===
- Turkish Super League
  - Winners (8) (record): 2006–07, 2007–08, 2008–09, 2015–16, 2018-19, 2020-21, 2023-24, 2025-26
  - Runners-up (8): 1985–86, 1987–88, 2001–02, 2005–06, 2011–12, 2012–13, 2013–14, 2014–15
- Turkish Cup
  - Winners (14): 1951, 1966, 1968, 1970, 1972, 1979, 1983, 2006, 2007, 2009, 2012, 2015, 2024, 2026
  - Runners-up (9): 1971, 1974, 1980, 1981, 1982, 1984, 1985, 2008, 2016

== Honours (Women) ==
=== European competitions ===
- European Champions League
  - Winners (1): 2014–15
  - Runners-up (1): 2013–14
- ETTU Cup
  - Winners (2): 2011–12, 2012–13
  - Quarter-finalist (1): 2010-11

=== National competitions ===
- Turkish Super League
  - Winners (19) (record): 1998–99, 1999–2000, 2000–01, 2001–02, 2007–08, 2009–10, 2010–11, 2011–12, 2012–13, 2013–14, 2014–15, 2015–16, 2018-19, 2020-21, 2021-22, 2022-23, 2023-24, 2024-25, 2025-26
  - Runners-up (4): 2002–03, 2005–06, 2006–07, 2008–09
- Turkish Cup
  - Winners (18) (record): 1968, 1999, 2000, 2001, 2007, 2008, 2009, 2010, 2011, 2012, 2013, 2014, 2015, 2019, 2022, 2023, 2025, 2026
  - Runners-up (2): 2002, 2006

=== Regional competitions ===
- Istanbul Championship/ League
  - Winners (11): 1964, 1965, 1966, 1967, 1968, 1970, 1976, 1999, 2000, 2001, 2002

== Technical and managerial staff ==
Name	Nat.	Position
David Sargisyan	(Turkey)	Men's and Women's Team Coach
Gürhan Yaldız	(Turkey)	Department Captain
Babur Üstündağ	(Turkey)	Coordinator and Youth Coach
Abdullah Karaoğlan	(Turkey)	Sport Hall Officer

== Current squads ==
Women
Name	Nationality
Sibel Altınkaya /born 1993)	(Turkey)
Irene Ivancan	(Germany)
Pınar Ergül	(Turkey)
Melis Budak	(Turkey)
Gülpembe Özkaya	(Turkey)

Men
Name	Nationality
Andrei Filimon	(Romania)
Mesud Farahmand	(Turkey)
Enis Can	(Turkey) (China)

== Noteble players ==
- Ece Haraç (born 2002)
