= European Champions League (table tennis) =

European table tennis competition

- Sport: Table tennis
- Founded: 1998
- No. of teams: 16 (Men's); 6 (Women's)
- Country: ETTU members
- Continent: Europe
- Most recent champions: (Germany) FC Saarbrücken (Men) (Germany) TTC Berlin Eastside (Women)
- Most titles: (Germany) Borussia Düsseldorf (Men); (Germany) TTC Berlin Eastside (Women)
- Broadcaster: Laola1
- Website: http://www.ettu.org/en/events/table-tennis-champions-league-men/general-information/

European Champions League (ECL) is the seasonal table tennis competition for the highest ranked European club teams and is regarded as the most important international club competition in Europe. It is organised by the European Table Tennis Union (ETTU) and replaced the European Club Cup of Champions (ECCC), the previous prominent club competition, since the 1998/99 season. Originally there was only a men's competition; a women's competition was introduced in the 2005/06 season. The competition starts in September and the champions are usually determined in May in recent years.

German club Borussia Düsseldorf is the most successful club in the history of the men's competition, having won the competition seven times and being the runners-up three times, while Belgian club La Villette Charleroi and Russian club Fakel Gazprom both have won five titles.

In the women's competition, TTC Berlin Eastside from Germany has won the league five times, making it the most successful club.

== History ==
The Men's Champions League was first organised in the 1998/99 season, with the aim to replace the European Club Cup of Champions, the previous highest level European club competition held since 1960/61 season. In the second season (99/00), the playing system was changed. The maximum number of games had been reduced from seven to five, and the double had been cancelled, with the aim of having a better presentation on TV and more excitement for the spectators. The competition came into a new era in 2005/06, when the Women's Champions League started with eight clubs and the men's league was expanded from 8 to 16 clubs, enabling a greater number of nations to participate. These changes were undertaken in the hopes of making table tennis more popular in a European level as well as motivating the coming generation. However, the number of teams in the women's competition decreased from eight to six in season 09/10.

In season 10/11, because of the Great Recession, there were just four teams entering the women's competition, a number lower than the previous year (there were six teams in season 09/10). As a result, the women's competition was suspended for one year. The men's competition was also affected, causing the number of teams to decrease from 16 to 14.

The women's competition resumed in season 11/12, with six teams entering the competition. The number of teams in the men's competition was also restored to 16.

== Qualification ==
Only teams from any top National Leagues have the right to enter in the competition.

For the men's competition, the 4 semi-finalists of the previous year are automatically included in the competition. The remaining 12 places are filled by the 12 teams with the highest total number of ranking points for their three best ranked players on the current world ranking, with only one "foreign player" being considered.

For the women's league, the previous year's two finalists compete in the competition with the six teams with the highest total number of ranking points for their three best ranked players, also with only one "foreign player" being considered.

Moreover, there is a limitation on the number of clubs from the same nations. Not more than 4 or 3 clubs, men's and women's respectively, from the same association are entitled the right to enter in the competition. In the men's competition, if the semi-finalists of the previous year came from the same association and a 5th team has the highest ranking points, the ranking of the final national team championships would decide on the qualification.

== Format ==
The league is completed in two stages. The first stage is the group round robin matches while the second stage is the straight 2-leg knock-out stage.

For the men's league, the 16 teams are divided into four groups within which they play round robin matches. The four teams with the highest ranking points will be seeded and play in the four groups respectively. During the group stage, 2 match points are awarded for a win, 1 for a loss and 0 for a loss in a not played or unfinished match, and the ranking order is determined by the numbers of match points gained.

If two or more teams have gained the same number of match points, their relative position are determined by the results only of the matches between them, taking successively the numbers of match points, the ratios of wins to losses in individual matches, games and points, as far as it is necessary to resolve the order. Lot is used to determine the position if teams are equal in all of the above criteria.

The top two teams in each group qualified for the knock-out stage. Those eight teams would play in a single knock-out system, with quarter-finals, semi-finals and finals, to determine the winner of the competition. At any stages two legs, home and away, are played for each tie, and teams win the tie if they win both legs. If each team wins one leg, the result is determined by aggregate score first in individual matches, then in games and finally in points.

The women's competition is held in similar format, with the exception that the six teams are divided into two groups and the two teams with the highest ranking points would be the seeds.

== Playing system ==
The competition is played under the new Swaythling Cup system (best of 5 singles). A team consists of 3 players selected from those nominated for the event. The opposite teams play 5 single matches with the match order A v X, B v Y, C v Z, A v Y, B v X. The team match will end if one of the teams has won 3 matches.

== Composition of teams ==
A club may nominate up to 8 players for the entire event, within which there can be a maximum of 2 foreign players. Only 1 foreign player can play in each team match and only players who have participated in at least 50% of the group matches are eligible to play the second stage. Reserve players being present in the hall would be considered as participants of the match, if confirmed on the result sheet by the referee.

Each player can only play for one club in a season. This regulation also applies to players taking part in any other team competition on the national level under the authority of an ITTF member association, except commitments for their national team.

== Finals ==
Men full results: https://tt-wiki.info/champions-league-herren/

Women full results: https://tt-wiki.info/champions-league-damen/

=== Men’s Champions League ===
Year	Champions	Score	Runner-up
1998/1999	(France) Caen TTC	3:4; 4:3 (20:18)	(Germany) Borussia Düsseldorf
1999/2000	(Germany) Borussia Düsseldorf	3:0; 3:0	(Austria) Niederösterreich
2000/2001	(Belgium) Royal Villette Charleroi	3:0; 3:2	(Austria) Niederösterreich
2001/2002	(Belgium) Royal Villette Charleroi	3:2; 3:1	(Austria) Niederösterreich
2002/2003	(Belgium) Royal Villette Charleroi	3:1; 3:2	(Germany) Zugbrücke Grenzau
2003/2004	(Belgium) Royal Villette Charleroi	3:1; 3:1	(Germany) Zugbrücke Grenzau
2004/2005	(Germany) RE-BAU Gönnern	1:3; 3:1 (18:13)	(Belgium) Royal Villette Charleroi
2005/2006	(Germany) RE-BAU Gönnern	2:3; 3:1	(Belgium) Royal Villette Charleroi
2006/2007	(Belgium) Royal Villette Charleroi	3:1; 3:2	(Austria) Niederösterreich
2007/2008	(Austria) Niederösterreich	3:0; 3:2	(Belgium) Royal Villette Charleroi
2008/2009	(Germany) Borussia Düsseldorf	2:3; 3:0	(Germany) Liebherr Ochsenhausen
2009/2010	(Germany) Borussia Düsseldorf	1:3; 3:0	(Belgium) Royal Villette Charleroi
2010/2011	(Germany) Borussia Düsseldorf	3:0; 1:3	(Russia) GAZPROM Fakel Orenburg
2011/2012	(Russia) Gazprom Orenburg	3:0; 3:2	(Russia) UMMC Ekaterinburg
2012/2013	(Russia) Gazprom Orenburg	3:1; 1:3 (315:311)	(France) Chartres
2013/2014	(France) Pontoise-Cergy	3:1; 1:3 (18:16)	(Russia) Gazprom Orenburg
2014/2015	(Russia) Gazprom Orenburg	1:3; 3:0	(Germany) Borussia Düsseldorf
2015/2016	(France) Pontoise-Cergy	1:3; 3:1 (15:14)	(Sweden) Eslövs AI BTK
2016/2017	(Russia) Fakel Gazprom	3:0; 3:2	(Germany) Borussia Düsseldorf
2017/2018	(Germany) Borussia Düsseldorf	3:2; 3:1	(Russia) Fakel Gazprom
2018/2019	(Russia) Fakel Gazprom	3:2; 3:2	(Russia) TTSC UMMC
2019/2020	Cancelled due to the COVID-19 pandemic.		
2020/2021	(Germany) Borussia Düsseldorf	3:1	(Germany) FC Saarbrücken
2021/2022	(Germany) Borussia Düsseldorf	Awarded	none
2022/2023	(Germany) FC Saarbrücken	2:3; 3:2; 2:1	(Germany) Borussia Düsseldorf
2023/2024	(Germany) FC Saarbrücken	3:2	(Germany) Borussia Düsseldorf
2024/2025	(Germany) FC Saarbrücken	3:1	(Germany) Borussia Düsseldorf
2025/2026	(Germany) FC Saarbrücken	3:2	(France) Alliance Nîmes-Montpellier

=== Women’s Champions League ===
Year	Champions	Score	Runner-up
2005/2006	(Italy) TT Castel Goffredo	3:2; 3:2	(Germany) TTC Langweid
2006/2007	(Italy) TT Castel Goffredo	3:2; 3:2	(Netherlands) MF Services Heerlen
2007/2008	(Netherlands) MF Services Heerlen	3:1; Kroppach unavailable to play	(Germany) FSV Kroppach
2008/2009	(Austria) Linz AG Froschberg	2:3; 3:1	(Germany) FSV Kroppach
2009/2010	(Netherlands) MF Services Heerlen	3:1; 3:0	(Austria) Linz AG Froschberg
2010/2011	Cancelled		
2011/2012	(Germany) Berlin Eastside	3:2; 2:3 (19–18)	(Austria) Ströck
2012/2013	(Austria) Linz AG Froschberg	3:1; 3:2	(Hungary) Budaörsi
2013/2014	(Germany) Berlin Eastside	3:2; 3:0	(Turkey) Fenerbahçe
2014/2015	(Turkey) Fenerbahçe	3:2; 3:1	(Austria) Linz AG Froschberg
2015/2016	(Germany) Berlin Eastside	3:2; 3:0	(Poland) SPAR-Zamek Tarnobrzeg
2016/2017	(Germany) Berlin Eastside	2:3; 3:1	(Poland) Siarka ZOT Tarnobrzeg
2017/2018	(Croatia) STK Dr. Časl	3:2; 3:0	(Turkey) Bursa BB
2018/2019	(Poland) Enea Siarka Tarnobrzeg	3:2; 3:2	(Croatia) STK Dr. Časl
2019/2020	Cancelled due to the COVID-19 pandemic.		
2020/2021	(Germany) Berlin Eastside	3:2	(Austria) Linz AG Froschberg
2021/2022	(Poland) Enea Siarkopol Tarnobrzeg	3:2; 3:2	(Germany) Berlin Eastside
2022/2023	(Poland) Enea Siarkopol Tarnobrzeg	3:0; 3:0	(France) Metz TT
2023/2024	(Poland) Enea Siarkopol Tarnobrzeg	3:2; 3:1	(France) ASRTT Étival
2024/2025	(Germany) Berlin Eastside	3:1; 2:3	(France) Metz TT
2025/2026	(Poland) Enea Siarkopol Tarnobrzeg	3:0	(France) Metz TT

== Statistics ==
=== Performance by club ===
==== Men's Champions League ====
Club	Winners	Runners-up	Years won	Years runner-up
(Germany) Borussia Düsseldorf	7	6	2000, 2009, 2010, 2011, 2018, 2021, 2022	1999, 2015, 2017, 2023, 2024, 2025
(Belgium) Royal Villette Charleroi	5	4	2001, 2002, 2003, 2004, 2007	2005, 2006, 2008, 2010
(Russia) TTC Fakel Gazprom	5	3	2012, 2013, 2015, 2017, 2019	2011, 2014, 2018
(Germany) FC Saarbrücken	4	1	2023, 2024, 2025, 2026	2021
(Germany) TTV RE-BAU Gönnern	2		2005, 2006	
(France) AS Pontoise Cergy	2		2014, 2016	
(Austria) SVS Niederösterreich	1	4	2008	2000, 2001, 2002, 2007
(France) Caen Tennis de Table Club	1		1999	
(Germany) TTC Zugbrücke Grenzau		2		2003, 2004
(Russia) UMMC Ekaterinburg		2		2012, 2019
(Germany) TTC Liebherr Ochsenhausen		1		2009
(France) Chartres ASTT		1		2013
(Sweden) Eslövs AI BTK		1		2016
(France) Alliance Nîmes-Montpellier TT		1		2026

==== Women's Champions League ====
Club	Winners	Runners-up	Years won	Years runner-up
(Germany) TTC Berlin Eastside	6	1	2012, 2014, 2016, 2017, 2021, 2025	2022
(Poland) KTS Tarnobrzeg	5	2	2019, 2022, 2023, 2024, 2026	2016, 2017
(Austria) Linz AG Froschberg	2	3	2009, 2013	2010, 2015, 2021
(Netherlands) MF Services Heerlen	2	1	2007, 2010	2006
(Italy) Sterilgarda TT Castelgoffredo	2		2005, 2006	
(Turkey) Fenerbahçe	1	1	2015	2014
(Croatia) Dr. Časl	1	1	2018	2019
(France) Metz TT		3		2023, 2025, 2026
(Germany) FSV Kroppach		2		2008, 2009
(Germany) Müllermilch Langweid		1		2006
(Austria) SVS Ströck		1		2012
(Hungary) Budaörsi SC		1		2013
(Turkey) Bursa BB		1		2018
(France) ASRTT Étival		1		2024

=== Performance by nation ===
==== Men's Champions League ====
Nation	Winners	Runners-up	Winning Clubs	Runners-Up
Germany	13	10	Borussia Düsseldorf (7), FC Saarbrücken (4), TTV RE-BAU Gönnern (2)	Borussia Düsseldorf (6), TTC Zugbrücke Grenzau (2), TTC Liebherr Ochsenhausen (1), FC Saarbrücken (1)
Russia	5	5	TTC Fakel Gazprom (5)	TTC Fakel Gazprom (3), UMMC Ekaterinburg (2)
Belgium	5	4	Royal Villette Charleroi (5)	Royal Villette Charleroi (4)
France	3	2	Caen Tennis de Table Club (1), AS Pontoise Cergy (2)	Chartres ASTT (1), Alliance Nîmes-Montpellier TT (1)
Austria	1	4	SVS Niederösterreich (1)	SVS Niederösterreich (4)
Sweden		1		Eslövs AI BTK (1)

==== Women's Champions League ====
Nation	Winners	Runners-up	Winning Clubs	Runners-Up
Germany	6	4	TTC Berlin Eastside (6)	TTC Berlin Eastside (1), FSV Kroppach (2), Müllermilch Langweid (1)
Poland	5	2	KTS Tarnobrzeg (5)	KTS Tarnobrzeg (2)
Austria	2	4	Linz AG Froschberg (2)	Linz AG Froschberg (3), SVS Strock (1)
Netherlands	2	1	MF Services Heerlen (2)	MF Services Heerlen (1)
Italy	2		Sterilgarda TT Castelgoffredo (2)	
Turkey	1	2	Fenerbahçe (1)	Fenerbahçe (1), Bursa BB (1)
Croatia	1	1	Dr. Časl (1)	Dr. Časl (1)
France		4		Metz TT (3), ASRTT Étival (1)
Hungary		1		Budaörsi SC (1)
