= Georgina Póta =

Hungarian table tennis player

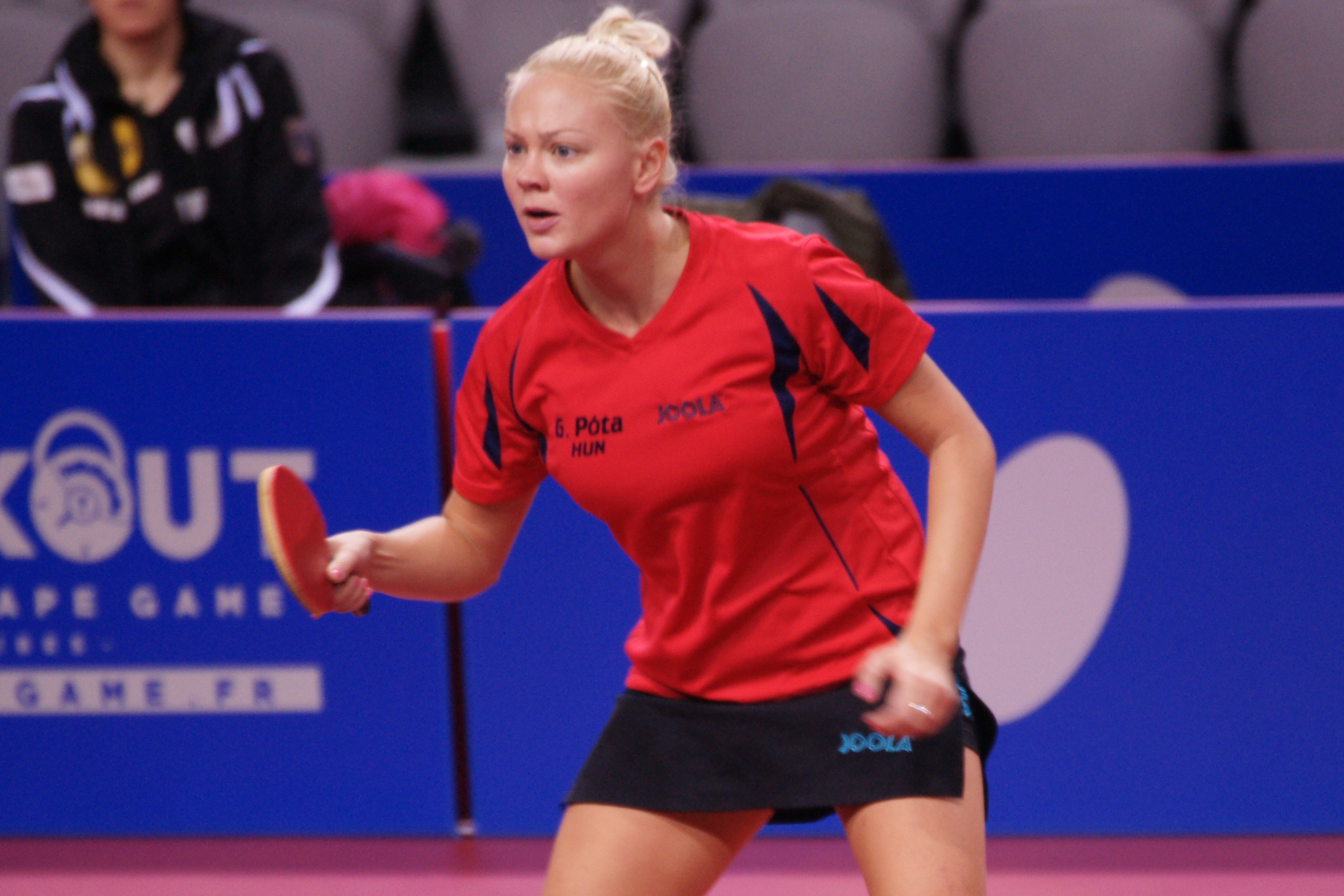
- Georgina Póta, Top 16 Antibes 2017

Personal information
- Nationality: Hungarian
- Born: 13 January 1985 (age 41) Budapest, Hungary
- Height: 1.7 m (5 ft 7 in)
- Weight: 60 kg (132 lb)

Sport
- Sport: Table tennis
- Club: TTC Berlin Eastside
- Playing style: Right-handed, shakehand grip
- Equipment: Stiga
- Highest ranking: 34 (May 2005)
- Current ranking: 45 (July 2014)
Medal record
Women's table tennis
Representing Hungary
European Championships
Gold medal – first place	2007 Belgrade	Team
Gold medal – first place	2008 St. Petersburg	Doubles
Silver medal – second place	2007 Belgrade	Doubles
Silver medal – second place	2008 St. Petersburg	Team
Silver medal – second place	2012 Herning	Doubles
Silver medal – second place	2015 Yekaterinburg	Doubles
Bronze medal – third place	2007 Belgrade	Mixed Doubles
Bronze medal – third place	2010 Ostrava	Doubles
World Cup
Bronze medal – third place	2007 Magdeburg	Team

Georgina Póta (Hungarian pronunciation: [ˈɡɛorɡinɒ ˈpoːtɒ]; born 13 January 1985 in Budapest) is a multiple European Champion table tennis player from Hungary.

== Career ==
Póta was born in the Hungarian capital Budapest in 1985 and began practicing table tennis in 1990. Between 1994 and 2008 she played for Statisztika PSC in Hungary, subsequently she moved to TTC Berlin Eastside.

For 1998 she already played in the Hungarian Top 12 and also participated at the Table Tennis European Youth Championships in Norcia, Italy, where she finished runner-up in the Girls' Cadet Doubles with Ildikó Csernyik. A year later she celebrated her first European Championship title after winning the Cadet Mixed Doubles event on the side of Dániel Zwickl. This was followed by other medals in the coming years, including three golds in the Junior category (women's doubles, team – 2001, Terni; women's singles – 2002, Moscow).

Her first major senior success came in 2007, when she won gold medal in the team competition at the Table Tennis European Championships in Belgrade. Additionally, she collected a silver medal in women's doubles and a bronze medal in mixed doubles. In the next year she won another gold at the 2008 Table Tennis European Championships, this time in doubles with Krisztina Tóth. In the team event she came second with Hungary.

She also competed at the Beijing 2008 Summer Olympics, where she was knocked out in the third round by Wang Nan of China who later managed to win the silver medal. Four years later at the 2012 Summer Olympics in London she was given bye in the first round due to her seeding and entered the competition in the second round against Tian Yuan. She beat her Croatian opponent 4–1, just to fell short against Park Mi-young with the same scoreline in the best of 32.

In 2014 she won both the German national cup and championship with TTC Berlin Eastside and also went triumphant in the European Champions League.

== Awards ==
- Hungarian Table Tennis Player of the Year: 2004, 2012, 2013
- Junior Prima Award: 2007

== See also ==
- List of table tennis players
