= Eslövs AI =

Table tennis club in Eslöv, Sweden

Eslövs AI BTK
- Full name: Eslövs Allmänna Idrottsförening Bordtennisklubb
- Founded: 1908 (table tennis section 1937)
- League: Pingisligan
- Based in: Eslöv, Sweden
- Arena: Eslövshallen
- Website: Official website

Eslövs AI BTK is a table tennis club based in Eslöv, Sweden. They have won the Swedish championship 13 times and also reached the final of the European Champions League – the premier continental competition in Europe – in 2015/2016.

The club has also got athletics and wrestling sections.

Eslöv won the Swedish championship with a record margin in 2008.

== Honors ==
- Pingisligan:
  - Winners: 2005, 2006, 2007, 2008, 2009, 2011, 2012, 2013, 2014, 2015, 2016, 2017, 2019
  - Runners-up: 1998, 2010, 2018
- European Champions League:
  - Runners-up: 2016

== Team ==
=== Roster ===
Roster for the 2024–25 season

- (Finland) Alex Naumi
- (Senegal) Ibrahima Diaw
- (Sweden) Martin Friis
- (Sweden) Truls Möregårdh
- (Sweden) William Bergenblock
