= Tetiana Bilenko =

Ukrainian table tennis player (born 1983)

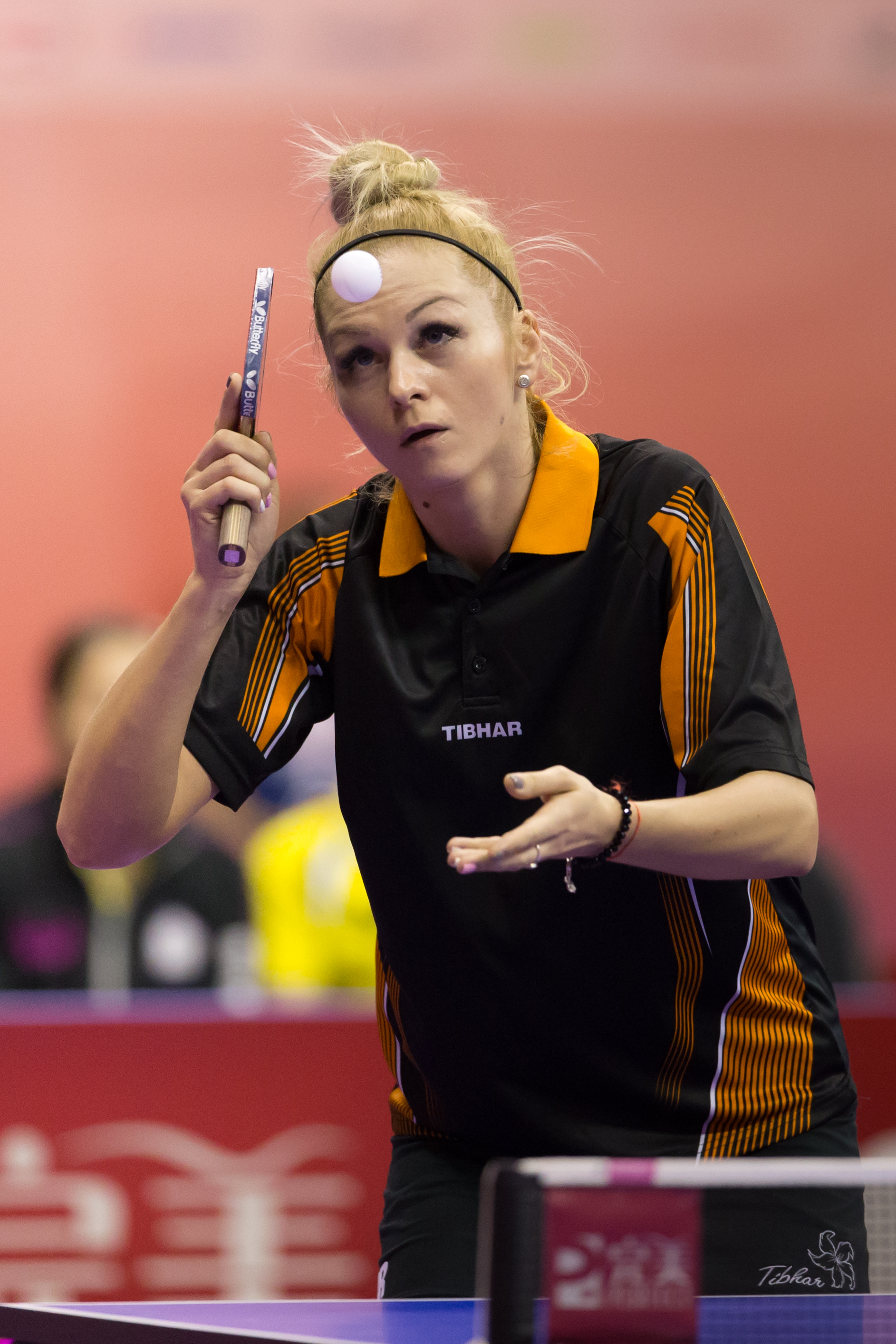
- Sorochynska in 2016

Personal information
- Full name: Tetyana Heorhiyivna Bilenko (Sorochynska)
- Nationality: Ukraine
- Born: 23 November 1983 (age 42) Kharkiv, Ukrainian SSR, Soviet Union

Sport
- Sport: Table tennis
Medal record
Women's table tennis
Representing Ukraine
European Championships
| Bronze medal – third place | 2015 Yekaterinburg | Team |
| Bronze medal – third place | 2020 Warsaw | Doubles |

Tetiana Heorhiivna Bilenko, (Note: Ukrainian: Тетяна Георгіївна Біленко) née Sorochynska (Note: Ukrainian: Сорочинська) (born 23 November 1983) is a Ukrainian table tennis player who has competed at three Olympics.

== Career ==
She competed at the 2008 Summer Olympics, reaching the first round of the singles competition. She also competed at the 2012 Summer Olympics with the same result. Since 2013, Bilenko practices at the Werner Schlager Academy in Schwechat, Austria and plays for WSA-partner club SVNÖ Ströck. She competed at the 2016 Summer Olympics in Rio de Janeiro.

In 2017, she competed for the Dabang Smashers TTC team in India. She currently plays for the Polish club BEBETTO AZS UJD in Częstochowa. During the 2021–22 season, she also represented the Czech club SKST PLUS Hodonín.
