= Kristin Silbereisen =

German table tennis player

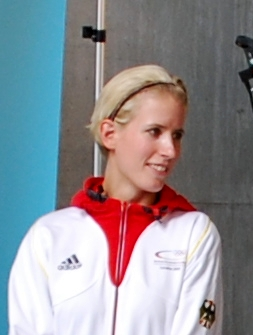

Personal information
- Full name: Kristin Silbereisen
- Nickname: Maomao
- Nationality: German
- Born: March 14, 1985 (age 41) Konstanz, West Germany
- Height: 1.68 m (5 ft 6 in)
- Weight: 58 kg (128 lb; 9.1 st)

Sport
- Sport: Table tennis
- Club: TTC Berlin Eastside
- Playing style: Shakehand
- Equipment: Tibhar
- Highest ranking: 30 (December 2010)
Medal record
Women's table tennis
Representing Germany
World Table Tennis Championships
Bronze medal – third place	2010 Moscow	Team
European Table Tennis Championships
Gold medal – first place	2013 Schwechat	Team
Bronze medal – third place	2007 Belgrade	Team
Bronze medal – third place	2009 Stuttgart	Doubles
Bronze medal – third place	2012 Herning	Team

Kristin Silbereisen (born March 14, 1985) is a German table tennis player who currently plays for TTC Berlin Eastside.

== Career ==
Silbereisen began playing table tennis at the age of seven and started competing for DJK Ochtendung. As a Cadet and Junior, she won Team Gold at the European Youth Championships three times.

She made her debut for the senior team on October 12, 2004, against Italy. Since then, she has achieved several significant accomplishments including:

- Bronze medal at the 2009 European Championships in the Doubles competition, partnering with Zhengqi Barthel.
- Bronze medal at the 2010 World Table Tennis Championships with the German team
- Team Bronze Medal at the 2007 European Championships.

Silbereisen won the German National Championships in Mixed doubles in 2005, partnering Christian Süss, and became the German Singles Champion in 2010.

In May 2011, she qualified directly for the London 2012 Olympic Games via her ITTF world ranking.

== Clubs ==
- SV Winterwerb: until 2002
- TuS Bad Driburg: 2002–2003
- Homberger TS: 2003–2005
- TV Busenbach: 2005–2010
- FSV Kroppach: 2010–2013
- TTC Berlin Eastside: 2013–

== Career record ==
=== World Championships ===
- 3rd place Women's Team: Moscow 2010

=== European Championships ===
- 3rd place Women's Team: Belgrade 2007
- 3rd place Women's Doubles: Stuttgart 2009

=== German Championships ===
- Winner Women's Singles: 2010
- Winner Women's Doubles: 2009 (with Zhengqi Barthel)
- Winner Mixed: 2005 (with Christian Süss)
- Runner-Up Women's Doubles: 2006 (with Elke Schall), 2007 (Irene Ivancan)
- Winner Mixed: 2005 (with Christian Süss)
- Runner-Up Mixed: 2003 (with Oliver Alke)

=== Pro Tour ===
- Quarterfinals Marocco Open 2011
- Quarterfinals Slovenian Open 2010
- Quarterfinals Austrian Open 2010
- 3rd place Women's Team German Open 2008
- 3rd place Brazilian Open 2005
- 2nd place Danish Open 2004
- Grand Finals participant 2004
