= 2009 World Table Tennis Championships – Women's singles =

Women's singles at the 2009 World Table Tennis Championships
- Venue: Yokohama Arena
- Location: Yokohama, Japan
- Final score: 10–12, 3–11, 11–2, 11–7, 11–7, 11–9

Medalists
gold medal	Zhang Yining	China
silver medal	Guo Yue	China
bronze medal	Liu Shiwen	China
bronze medal	Li Xiaoxia	China

The 2009 World Table Tennis Championships women's singles was the 50th edition of the women's singles championship. Zhang Yining won the title, defeating Guo Yue by four sets to two. The tournament was dominated by Chinese players, with all four semifinalists from that country and two more Chinese players knocked out by their countrywomen.

== Seeds ==
1. (China) Zhang Yining (champion)
2. (China) Guo Yue (final)
3. (China) Li Xiaoxia (semifinals)
4. (China) Guo Yan (fourth round)
5. (Singapore) Feng Tianwei (quarterfinals)
6. (South Korea) Kim Kyung-ah (third round)
7. (Singapore) Wang Yuegu (second round)
8. (Hong Kong) Tie Ya Na (second round)
9. (Hong Kong) Jiang Huajun (fourth round)
10. (China) Liu Shiwen (semifinals)
11. (Austria) Liu Jia (third round)
12. (China) Ding Ning (fourth round)
13. (United States) Gao Jun (second round)
14. (Netherlands) Li Jiao (fourth round)
15. (Japan) Sayaka Hirano (second round)
16. (South Korea) Park Mi-young (fourth round)
17. (Poland) Li Qian (second round)
18. (China) Yao Yan (first round)
19. (Belarus) Viktoria Pavlovich (third round)
20. (South Korea) Dang Ye-seo (quarterfinals)
21. (Netherlands) Li Jie (third round)
22. (Hungary) Krisztina Tóth (fourth round)
23. (Germany) Wu Jiaduo (third round)
24. (Hong Kong) Lin Ling (third round)
25. (Singapore) Sun Beibei (third round)
26. (Japan) Ai Fukuhara (second round)
27. (Romania) Daniela Dodean (third round)
28. (Singapore) Yu Mengyu (fourth round)
29. (Croatia) Tamara Boroš (first round)
30. (Romania) Elizabeta Samara (second round)
31. (Japan) Haruna Fukuoka (third round)
32. (Hong Kong) Lau Sui Fei (first round)

== Final Rounds ==
Quarterfinals
1	(China) Zhang Yining	11	7	11	11	11
(Japan) K. Ishikawa	4	11	4	4	7
(Czech Republic) I. Vacenovská	11	8	10	5	15
10	(China) Liu Shiwen	9	11	12	11	17
3	(China) Li Xiaoxia	11	11	2	11	11
20	(South Korea) Dang Ye-Seo	9	4	11	9	6
5	(Singapore) Feng Tianwei	7	7	8	11	8
2	(China) Guo Yue	11	11	11	8	11

Semifinals
1	(China) Zhang Yining	11	11	11	8	10	11
10	(China) Liu Shiwen	8	8	6	11	12	8
3	(China) Li Xiaoxia	8	5	12	5	9
2	(China) Guo Yue	11	11	10	11	11

Final
1	(China) Zhang Yining	10	3	11	11	11	11
2	(China) Guo Yue	12	11	2	7	7	9

== Early Rounds ==
=== Section 1 ===
First Round
1	(China) Zhang Yining	11	11	11	11
16	(Croatia) Andrea Bakula	2	5	5	4
8	(Ukraine) T. Sorochynska	11	4	9	11	5	11	6
9	(Italy) N. Stefanova	4	11	11	5	11	6	11
5	(Sweden) Matilda Ekholm	11	11	7	11	5	11
Q	(Bulgaria) Anelia Karova	5	9	11	1	11	7
Q	(Singapore) Kai Xin Zena Sim	5	8	6	4
27	(Romania) Daniela Dodean	11	11	11	11
22	(Hungary) Krisztina Tóth	9	11	11	11	11
Q	(Slovenia) Jana Tomazini	11	7	8	6	4
Q	(Malaysia) Chiu Soo Jiin	7	8	8	6
14	(Turkey) Melek Hu	11	11	11	11
7	(Spain) Zhu Fang	11	11	11	11
Q	(Netherlands) Carla Nouwen	4	2	5	2
2	(Canada) Zhang Mo	7	7	7	3
13	(United States) Gao Jun	11	11	11	11

Second Round
1	(China) Zhang Yining	11	11	11	11
(Italy) N. Stefanova	7	3	6	3
(Sweden) Matilda Ekholm	7	2	11	4	8
27	(Romania) D. Dodean	11	11	7	11	11
22	(Hungary) Krisztina Tóth	11	10	14	11	11	11
(Turkey) Melek Hu	7	12	12	6	13	5
(Spain) Zhu Fang	11	1	11	9	11	8	11
13	(United States) Gao Jun	9	11	9	11	9	11	9

Third Round
1	(China) Zhang Yining	11	11	11	11
27	(Romania) Daniela Dodean	4	9	5	9
22	(Hungary) Krisztina Tóth	8	11	11	8	11	6	11
(Spain) Zhu Fang	11	2	8	11	7	11	1

Fourth Round
1	(China) Zhang Yining	11	11	11	11
22	(Hungary) Krisztina Tóth	6	2	3	6

=== Section 2 ===
First Round
11	(Austria) Liu Jia	11	11	11	11
16	(Ukraine) Ganna Gaponova	5	5	9	8
8	(Greece) Christina Fili	8	11	11	8	2
9	(South Korea) Lee Eun Hee	11	9	13	11	11
5	(Belarus) V. Pavlovich	11	10	9	11	2	10
12	(Russia) E. Troshneva	8	12	11	8	11	12
4	(Serbia) Anamaria Erdelji	11	2	5	2	9
28	(Singapore) Yu Mengyu	9	11	11	11	11
31	(Japan) Haruna Fukuoka	11	11	10	11	11
11	(Italy) Laura Negrisoli	5	6	12	5	6
3	(France) Carole Grundisch	12	10	10	11	4	7
14	(Germany) K. Silbereisen	10	12	12	8	11	11
7	(Japan) K. Ishikawa	11	11	12	8	11
10	(Hong Kong) Yu Kwok See	1	7	10	11	8
2	(Poland) Natalia Partyka	7	9	6	11	8
8	(Hong Kong) Tie Yana	11	11	11	9	11

Second Round
11	(Austria) Liu Jia	12	10	11	11	11
(South Korea) Lee Eun Hee	10	12	2	4	5
(Russia) Elena Troshneva	8	11	6	6	7
28	(Singapore) Yu Mengyu	11	7	11	11	11
31	(Japan) H. Fukuoka	11	11	9	11	11
(Germany) K. Silbereisen	9	5	11	3	4
(Japan) K. Ishikawa	8	8	5	12	11	11	11
8	(Hong Kong) Tie Yana	11	11	11	10	9	5	8

Third Round
11	(Austria) Liu Jia	11	7	7	11	3
28	(Singapore) Yu Mengyu	7	11	11	13	11
31	(Japan) Haruna Fukuoka	12	4	13	4	7
(Japan) K. Ishikawa	10	11	15	11	11

Fourth Round
28	(Singapore) Yu Mengyu	9	11	2	8	11	9
(Japan) K. Ishikawa	11	9	11	11	9	11

=== Section 3 ===
First Round
7	(Singapore) Wang Yuegu	10	9	11	9	11	11	11
16	(Ukraine) M. Pesotska	12	11	7	11	6	7	8
8	(England) Kelly Sibley	11	4	6	11	7	12	7
9	(Czech Republic) R. Štrbíková	9	11	11	4	11	10	11
5	(France) Xian Yi Fang	11	11	11	11
Q	(Israel) Einat Amar	7	3	3	7
Q	(Slovakia) Barbora Balazova	6	3	4	11
19	(Belarus) V. Pavlovich	11	11	11	11
29	(Croatia) Tamara Boroš	9	5	1	15	16	7
11	(Russia) A. Voronova	11	11	11	13	14	11
Q	(Venezuela) Fabiola Ramos	5	5	8	5
14	(Czech Republic) I. Vacenovská	11	11	11	11
7	(Slovakia) Eva Ódorová	11	11	8	9	14	11
Q	(Croatia) Mirela Durak	3	7	11	11	12	8
2	(Greece) Ekaterina Ntoulaki	7	8	8	8
15	(Japan) Sayaka Hirano	11	11	11	11

Second Round
7	(Singapore) Wang Yuegu	11	9	11	11	5	9	8
(Czech Republic) R. Štrbíková	9	11	3	4	11	11	11
(France) Xian Yi Fang	3	7	11	3	5
19	(Belarus) V. Pavlovich	11	11	8	11	11
(Russia) A. Voronova	3	4	8	10
(Czech Republic) I. Vacenovská	11	11	11	12
(Slovakia) Eva Ódorová	11	4	9	12	15	11
15	(Japan) Sayaka Hirano	9	11	11	10	13	6

Third Round
(Czech Republic) Renata Štrbíková	11	10	11	5	6	11	11
19	(Belarus) V. Pavlovich	8	12	9	11	11	6	7
(Czech Republic) I. Vacenovská	11	8	11	12	11	11
(Slovakia) Eva Ódorová	5	11	4	14	7	7

Fourth Round
(Czech Republic) Renata Štrbíková	11	8	6	11	5	9
(Czech Republic) I. Vacenovská	9	11	11	8	11	11

=== Section 4 ===
First Round
10	(China) Liu Shiwen	11	11	11	11
Q	(Russia) Yana Noskova	7	5	2	4
Q	(Malaysia) Ng Sock Khim	11	3	5	11	6
9	(Chinese Taipei) Lu Yun-Feng	13	11	11	8	11
5	(Japan) Mikie Tasei	11	11	11	11
12	(Republic of the Congo) Han Xing	4	6	3	8
4	(Malaysia) Beh Lee Wei	9	7	12	7
17	(Poland) Li Qian	11	11	14	11
18	(China) Yao Yan	5	5	11	9	11	11	7
11	(South Korea) Park Y. Sook	11	11	3	11	9	7	11
Q	(Egypt) Sara El-Sokary	4	9	8	9
14	(Spain) Galia Dvorak	11	11	11	11
7	(Russia) Anna Tikhomirova	3	9	11	8	11	10
Q	(Sweden) M. Pettersson	11	11	2	11	8	12
Q	(Israel) Natali Ruvman	1	2	1	2
4	(China) Guo Yan	11	11	11	11

Second Round
10	(China) Liu Shiwen	11	11	11	11
(Chinese Taipei) Lu Yun-Feng	6	3	4	4
(Japan) Mikie Tasei	11	6	8	11	11	11
17	(Poland) Li Qian	8	11	11	8	5	4
(South Korea) Park Y. Sook	15	11	14	11
(Spain) Galia Dvorak	13	8	12	7
Q	(Sweden) Malin Pettersson	4	5	4	8
4	(China) Guo Yan	11	11	11	11

Third Round
10	(China) Liu Shiwen	11	11	11	11
(Japan) Mikie Tasei	2	3	3	4
(South Korea) Park Y. Sook	4	7	11	7	9
4	(China) Guo Yan	11	11	8	11	11

Fourth Round
10	(China) Liu Shiwen	11	11	13	11
4	(China) Guo Yan	5	6	11	4

=== Section 5 ===
First Round
3	(China) Li Xiaoxia	11	11	11	11
16	(Thailand) A. Muangsuk	6	4	7	2
Q	(India) S. Kumaresan	11	11	11	5	8
9	(Japan) Yuka Ishigaki	13	7	13	11	11
5	(Germany) Elke Schall	w/o
12	(Australia) Jian Fang Lay
Q	(Moldova) Elena Mocrousov	4	2	4	7
26	(Japan) Ai Fukuhara	11	11	11	11
23	(Germany) Wu Jiaduo	6	11	11	9	11	11
Q	(Belarus) A. Privalova	11	6	7	11	6	5
Q	(France) Audrey Mattenet	11	12	8	11	9	8
14	(Austria) Li Qiangbing	7	14	11	7	11	11
7	(Luxembourg) Ni Xialian
10	(Czech Republic) Dana Hadacova	w/o
Q	(Colombia) Paula Medina	4	1	5	7
12	(China) Ding Ning	11	11	11	11

Second Round
3	(China) Li Xiaoxia	11	11	9	11	11
(Japan) Yuka Ishigaki	5	6	11	1	6
(Germany) Elke Schall	12	6	3	11	11	11
26	(Japan) Ai Fukuhara	10	11	11	5	7	3
23	(Germany) Wu Jiaduo	12	13	13	8	6	8	11
(Austria) Li Qiangbing	10	11	11	11	11	11	6
(Czech Republic) Dana Hadacova	3	3	4	1
12	(China) Ding Ning	11	11	11	11

Third Round
3	(China) Li Xiaoxia	11	6	11	11	11
(Germany) Elke Schall	5	11	2	8	8
23	(Germany) Wu Jiaduo	8	11	7	8
12	(China) Ding Ning	11	13	11	11

Fourth Round
3	(China) Li Xiaoxia	11	5	11	11	12
12	(China) Ding Ning	6	11	9	6	10

=== Section 6 ===
First Round
14	(Netherlands) Li Jiao	11	5	11	11	11
16	(Turkey) Sirin He	8	11	9	6	8
8	(Spain) Sara Ramirez	11	11	3	6	9	6
9	(Poland) Xu Jie	4	6	11	11	11	11
5	(Hungary) Georgina Pota	5	4	11	13	11	11
Q	(Austria) Martina Petzner	11	11	5	11	6	5
Q	(United States) Crystal Xi Huang	6	15	2	5
25	(Singapore) Sun Beibei	11	17	11	11
20	(South Korea) Dang Ye-Seo	11	12	11	11
Q	(Brazil) Ligia Santos Silva	6	10	4	6
Q	(Turkey) Fulya Ozler	11	14	11	7	3	7
14	(Thailand) N. Komwong	8	16	6	11	11	11
7	(Denmark) Mie Skov	11	11	11	11
Q	(Venezuela) Ruaida Ezzeddine	5	1	4	8
Q	(India) Mouma Das	10	7	10	5
6	(South Korea) Kim Kyung Ah	12	11	12	11

Second Round
14	(Netherlands) Li Jiao	11	11	11	11
(Poland) Xu Jie	7	9	8	5
(Hungary) Georgina Pota	5	4	11	10	8
25	(Singapore) Sun Beibei	11	11	8	12	11
20	(South Korea) Dang Ye-Seo	8	10	11	11	12	7	11
(Thailand) N. Komwong	11	12	5	8	10	11	8
(Denmark) Mie Skov	7	3	7	5
6	(South Korea) Kim Kyung Ah	11	11	11	11

Third Round
14	(Netherlands) Li Jiao	11	11	11	8	11	4	11
25	(Singapore) Sun Beibei	8	13	9	11	7	11	7
20	(South Korea) Dang Ye-Seo	11	11	9	11	11
6	(South Korea) Kim Kyung Ah	3	8	11	7	7

Fourth Round
14	(Netherlands) Li Jiao	9	11	10	11	11	15	8
20	(South Korea) Dang Ye-Seo	11	4	12	7	7	17	11

=== Section 7 ===
First Round
5	(Singapore) Feng Tianwei	11	11	11	11
Q	(India) K. Chakraborty	3	7	7	7
8	(Chinese Taipei) Liu Hsing-Yin	5	6	11	15	7	4
9	(Hungary) Petra Lovas	11	11	5	13	11	11
5	(Italy) W. T. Monfardini	11	11	11	11
12	(Republic of Ireland) Liu Na	3	2	7	9
Q	(United States) Ariel Hsing	8	2	3	7
21	(Netherlands) Li Jie	11	11	11	11
32	(Hong Kong) Lau Sui Fei	11	11	8	9	11	5	6
11	(Australia) Miao Miao	6	5	11	11	6	11	11
Q	(Bulgaria) Asya Kasabova	4	1	6	9
14	(Japan) Ai Fujinuma	11	11	11	11
7	(Germany) Zhenqi Barthel	11	11	11	13
10	(England) Joanna Parker	6	2	6	11
2	(Netherlands) Linda Creemers	4	11	4	6
16	(South Korea) Park Mi-Young	11	13	11	11

Second Round
5	(Singapore) Feng Tianwei	11	11	11	12
(Hungary) Petra Lovas	4	7	8	10
(Italy) W. T. Monfardini	8	4	8	7
21	(Netherlands) Li Jie	11	11	11	11
(Australia) Miao Miao	8	4	7	7
(Japan) Ai Fujinuma	11	11	11	11
(Germany) Zhenqi Barthel	7	8	11	4	8
16	(South Korea) Park Mi-Young	11	11	6	11	11

Third Round
5	(Singapore) Feng Tianwei	13	11	11	9	11
21	(Netherlands) Li Jie	11	5	9	11	3
(Japan) Ai Fujinuma	3	3	8	5
16	(South Korea) Park Mi-Young	11	11	11	11

Fourth Round
5	(Singapore) Feng Tianwei	11	11	5	10	11	11	13
16	(South Korea) Park Mi-Young	9	7	11	12	13	9	11

=== Section 8 ===
First Round
9	(Hong Kong) Jiang Huajun	11	11	11	12
Q	(Denmark) Pernille Agerholm	4	6	4	10
8	(Republic of the Congo) Yang Fen
9	(Lithuania) R. Paskauskiene	w/o
5	(Hong Kong) Zhang Rui	10	11	11	11	17
12	(Chinese Taipei) Cheng I-Ching	12	7	4	5	15
Q	(New Zealand) Yang Sun	7	6	5	1
24	(Hong Kong) Lin Ling	11	11	11	11
30	(Romania) Elizabeta Samara	11	11	11	11
11	(United States) Jasna Reed	6	4	4	3
3	(Russia) Polina Mikhaylova	9	9	8	9
14	(Chinese Taipei) Huang Yi-Hua	11	11	11	11
7	(South Korea) Seok Ha-Jung	11	11	11	11
Q	(Luxembourg) Simone Haan	7	8	5	2
Q	(India) Poulomi Ghatak	8	3	3	7
2	(China) Guo Yue	11	11	11	11

Second Round
9	(Hong Kong) Jiang Huajun	11	11	11	11
(Lithuania) R. Paskauskiene	9	9	5	2
(Hong Kong) Zhang Rui	11	9	9	11	5	3
24	(Hong Kong) Lin Ling	6	11	11	8	11	11
30	(Romania) Elizabeta Samara	5	9	11	7	11	12	7
(Chinese Taipei) Huang Yi-Hua	11	11	9	11	8	10	11
(South Korea) Seok Ha-Jung	8	3	9	1
2	(China) Guo Yue	11	11	11	11

Third Round
9	(Hong Kong) Jiang Huajun	11	11	10	7	11	8	11
24	(Hong Kong) Lin Ling	6	5	12	11	9	11	7
(Chinese Taipei) Huang Yi-Hua	9	4	5	7
2	(China) Guo Yue	11	11	11	11

Fourth Round
9	(Hong Kong) Jiang Huajun	11	11	8	11	12	4	5
2	(China) Guo Yue	9	13	11	8	10	11	11
