= 2011 World Table Tennis Championships – Women's singles =

Women's singles at the 2011 World Table Tennis Championships
- Venue: Rotterdam Ahoy
- Location: Rotterdam, Netherlands
- Dates: 10–14 May
- Final score: 12–10, 13–11, 11–9, 8–11, 8–11, 11–7

Medalists
gold medal	Ding Ning	China
silver medal	Li Xiaoxia	China
bronze medal	Guo Yue	China
bronze medal	Liu Shiwen	China

Zhang Yining won the title in 2009 but has since retired from international table tennis.

Li Xiaoxia met compatriot Ding Ning in the final of this event. The latter won 12–10, 13–11, 11–9, 8–11, 8–11, 11–7.

== Seeds ==
Based on the ITTF world ranking issued before the Championships, top 64 seeds directly entered the first round of the 128-player sized draw.

1. (China) Li Xiaoxia (final)
2. (China) Guo Yan (quarterfinals)
3. (China) Ding Ning (world champion)
4. (China) Guo Yue (semifinals)
5. (China) Liu Shiwen (semifinals)
6. (Singapore) Feng Tianwei (quarterfinals)
7. (Japan) Ai Fukuhara (third round)
8. (China) Wu Yang (quarterfinals)
9. (South Korea) Kim Kyung-Ah (third round)
10. (Japan) Kasumi Ishikawa (fourth round)
11. (Japan) Sayaka Hirano (fourth round)
12. (Singapore) Wang Yuegu (third round)
13. (Netherlands) Li Jiao (third round)
14. (Hong Kong) Tie Ya Na (fourth round)
15. (Germany) Wu Jiaduo (fourth round)
16. (South Korea) Park Mi-Young (second round)
17. (South Korea) Seok Ha-Jung (second round)
18. (Spain) Shen Yanfei (fourth round)
19. (Hong Kong) Jiang Huajun (fourth round)
20. (Chinese Taipei) Huang Yi-hua (second round)
21. (Singapore) Li Jiawei (third round)
22. (China) Fan Ying (quarterfinals)
23. (South Korea) Yang Ha-Eun (third round)
24. (Singapore) Yu Mengyu (third round)
25. (Netherlands) Li Jie (fourth round)
26. (Belarus) Viktoria Pavlovich (fourth round)
27. (Japan) Yuka Ishigaki (second round)
28. (Turkey) Melek Hu (third round)
29. (Poland) Li Qian (third round)
30. (Singapore) Sun Beibei (third round)
31. (Romania) Daniela Dodean (second round)
32. (Hungary) Krisztina Tóth (third round)
33. (Germany) Kristin Silbereisen (first round)
34. (Hungary) Georgina Póta (second round)
35. (Japan) Hiroko Fujii (third round)
36. (Romania) Elizabeta Samara (second round)
37. (Luxembourg) Ni Xia Lian (second round)
38. (South Korea) Moon Hyun-Jung (second round)
39. (Hong Kong) Lee Ho Ching (second round)
40. (North Korea) Kim Jong (third round)
41. (Japan) Misako Wakamiya (second round)
42. (Hungary) Petra Lovas (second round)
43. (Czech Republic) Iveta Vacenovska (second round)
44. (Chinese Taipei) Cheng I-ching (second round)
45. (Spain) Zhu Fang (second round)
46. (Dominican Republic) Wu Xue (second round)
47. (Hong Kong) Lau Sui-fei (first round, disqualified)
48. (Russia) Anna Tikhomirova (first round)
49. (South Korea) Song Ma-Eum (second round)
50. (Belarus) Veronika Pavlovich (first round)
51. (Germany) Zhenqi Barthel (second round)
52. (Ukraine) Margaryta Pesotska (second round)
53. (Czech Republic) Renata Strbikova (first round)
54. (Japan) Ayuka Tanioka (second round)
55. (Serbia) Gabriela Feher (third round)
56. (France) Carole Grundisch (first round)
57. (Lithuania) Rūta Paškauskienė (second round)
58. (Spain) Sara Ramirez (first round)
59. (Austria) Li Qiangbing (third round)
60. (Serbia) Anamaria Erdelji (second round)
61. (France) Xian Yi Fang (second round)
62. (Hong Kong) Ng Wing Nam (second round)
63. (Poland) Natalia Partyka (second round)
64. (Sweden) Matilda Ekholm (second round)

== Draw ==
=== Key ===
- Q = Qualifier
- w/o = Walkover
- w/d = Withdraw
- r = Retired
- DQ = Disqualified

=== Finals ===
Quarterfinals
1	(China) Li Xiaoxia	11	11	10	11	11
8	(China) Wu Yang	7	5	12	8	6
22	(China) Fan Ying	4	7	11	11	5	11	4
4	(China) Guo Yue	11	11	4	8	11	5	11
3	(China) Ding Ning	11	11	11	11
6	(Singapore) Feng Tianwei	3	5	6	4
5	(China) Liu Shiwen	11	11	11	12
2	(China) Guo Yan	3	9	5	10

Semifinals
1	(China) Li Xiaoxia	11	11	11	11
4	(China) Guo Yue	5	6	7	8
3	(China) Ding Ning	11	11	8	11	11	11
5	(China) Liu Shiwen	13	9	11	6	8	6

Final
1	(China) Li Xiaoxia	10	11	9	11	11	7
3	(China) Ding Ning	12	13	11	8	8	11

=== Top half ===
==== Section 1 ====
First Round
1	(China) Li X	11	11	11	11
Q	(Chinese Taipei) Liu H-Y	4	2	2	7
Q	(France) A Dessaint	3	8	5	7
42	(Hungary) P Lovas	11	11	11	11
40	(North Korea) Kim J	11	11	11	11
(Singapore) Li I S	6	6	1	3
(Thailand) A Muangsuk	4	8	13	2	16	1
17	(South Korea) Seok H-J	11	11	11	11	14	11
18	(Spain) Y Shen	11	11	11	9	11	12
(Republic of the Congo) X Han	13	7	9	11	1	10
Q	(India) M Patkar	11	11	14	6	13	7	6
62	(Hong Kong) Ng W N	13	6	12	11	11	11	11
48	(Russia) A Tikhomirova	11	8	9	9	7
Q	(Australia) J F Lay	6	11	11	11	11
(Germany) S Winter	3	6	8	11	11	5
13	(Netherlands) Jiao Li	11	11	11	7	6	11

Second Round
1	(China) Li X	11	11	11	11
42	(Hungary) P Lovas	8	5	6	7
40	(North Korea) Kim J	9	11	12	11	9	11
17	(South Korea) Seok H-J	11	9	10	7	11	4
18	(Spain) Y Shen	12	12	11	12
62	(Hong Kong) Ng W N	10	10	5	10
Q	(Australia) J F Lay	14	11	7	8	9	8
13	(Netherlands) Jiao Li	12	8	11	11	11	11

Third Round
1	(China) Li X	11	11	11	11
40	(North Korea) Kim J	6	9	10	5
18	(Spain) Y Shen	11	12	8	12	11
13	(Netherlands) Jiao Li	4	10	11	10	4

Fourth Round
1	(China) Li X	11	10	11	11	11
18	(Spain) Y Shen	2	12	4	4	6

==== Section 2 ====
First Round
9	(South Korea) Kim K-A	11	11	11	11
(Russia) O Fadeeva	7	9	7	7
(Spain) G Dvorak	11	9	11	11	11
33	(Germany) K Silbereisen	8	11	8	8	5
46	(Dominican Republic) X Wu	11	11	11	11
(Germany) K Mühlbach	4	9	5	8
Q	(Poland) A Szymanska	7	8	5	2
26	(Belarus) Vi Pavlovich	11	11	11	11
21	(Singapore) Li Jiawei	11	12	11	11
(Hong Kong) Yu K S	2	10	6	4
Q	(Serbia) A Todorović	9	5	6	9
44	(Chinese Taipei) Cheng I-C	11	11	11	11
51	(Germany) Z Barthel	8	11	11	20	11
(Thailand) N Komwong	11	7	7	18	9
(Russia) P Mikhaylova	8	2	5	6
8	(China) Wu Y	11	11	11	11

Second Round
9	(South Korea) Kim K-A	12	11	11	11
(Spain) G Dvorak	10	2	3	7
46	(Dominican Republic) X Wu	9	7	3	11	9
26	(Belarus) Vi Pavlovich	11	11	11	9	11
21	(Singapore) Li Jiawei	6	5	14	11	11	12
44	(Chinese Taipei) Cheng I-C	11	11	12	4	9	10
51	(Germany) Z Barthel	12	11	11	5	7	6
8	(China) Wu Y	14	3	9	11	11	11

Third Round
9	(South Korea) Kim K-A	3	11	11	9	6	11	7
26	(Belarus) Vi Pavlovich	11	9	8	11	11	7	11
21	(Singapore) Li Jiawei	4	4	3	5
8	(China) Wu Y	11	11	11	11

Fourth Round
26	(Belarus) Vi Pavlovich	11	13	11	5	9	8
8	(China) Wu Y	6	15	7	11	11	11

==== Section 3 ====
First Round
7	(Japan) A Fukuhara	11	7	11	11	11
(Canada) M Zhang	7	11	3	7	8
(North Korea) Kim H-S	4	11	11	11	9	6	11
58	(Spain) S Ramirez	11	7	9	3	11	11	4
57	(Lithuania) R Paškauskienė	11	11	11	11
Q	(Ukraine) G Gaponova	4	4	6	9
(Russia) Y Noskova	11	3	8	5
22	(China) Fan Y	13	11	11	11
32	(Hungary) K Tóth	11	11	11	11
Q	(Brazil) L Silva	7	8	9	6
(Czech Republic) D Hadačová	6	11	6	10	13	8
64	(Sweden) M Ekholm	11	6	11	11	11	11
60	(Serbia) A Erdelji	5	12	11	11	11
Q	(Hong Kong) Guan M Y	11	10	5	9	8
(Chinese Taipei) Chen S-Y	6	9	8	10
11	(Japan) S Hirano	11	11	11	12

Second Round
7	(Japan) A Fukuhara	11	11	7	12	10	11
(North Korea) Kim H-S	4	8	11	10	12	7
57	(Lithuania) R Paškauskienė	7	3	11	9
22	(China) Fan Y	11	11	13	11
32	(Hungary) K Tóth	11	9	11	5	11	11
64	(Sweden) M Ekholm	9	11	6	11	8	8
60	(Serbia) A Erdelji	3	7	6	11
11	(Japan) S Hirano	11	11	11	13

Third Round
7	(Japan) A Fukuhara	11	7	10	8	7
22	(China) Fan Y	8	11	12	11	11
32	(Hungary) K Tóth	8	6	11	12	11	5
11	(Japan) S Hirano	11	11	7	10	13	11

Fourth Round
22	(China) Fan Y	3	11	11	11	11
11	(Japan) S Hirano	11	7	4	8	4

==== Section 4 ====
First Round
15	(Germany) J Wu	11	12	11	11
(Netherlands) L Creemers	8	10	3	8
(England) K Sibley	8	6	5	8
49	(South Korea) Song M-E	11	11	11	11
59	(Austria) Q Li	11	4	13	11	11
(Romania) C Postoaca	6	11	11	6	2
(England) J Parker	4	11	11	8	11	11	13
27	(Japan) Y Ishigaki	11	7	8	11	13	7	15
20	(Chinese Taipei) Huang Y-H	11	11	11	11
Q	(Slovakia) B Balazova	5	6	7	5
Q	(Turkey) G Gungor	1	8	4	4
55	(Serbia) G Feher	11	11	11	11
56	(France) C Grundisch	3	11	2	11	9	11	5
Q	(North Korea) Ri M-G	11	2	11	3	11	7	11
Q	(Netherlands) B Eerland	6	8	5	7
4	(China) Guo Yue	11	11	11	11

Second Round
15	(Germany) J Wu	12	11	11	11
49	(South Korea) Song M-E	10	7	3	6
59	(Austria) Q Li	6	11	6	11	6	11	11
27	(Japan) Y Ishigaki	11	7	11	9	11	7	9
20	(Chinese Taipei) Huang Y-H	11	13	10	9	11	11	12
55	(Serbia) G Feher	7	15	12	11	6	7	14
Q	(North Korea) Ri M-G	8	3	3	2
4	(China) Guo Yue	11	11	11	11

Third Round
15	(Germany) J Wu	11	11	7	11	12	11
59	(Austria) Q Li	2	4	11	7	14	4
55	(Serbia) G Feher	5	6	1	4
4	(China) Guo Yue	11	11	11	11

Fourth Round
15	(Germany) J Wu	8	4	8	8
4	(China) Guo Yue	11	11	11	11

=== Bottom half ===
==== Section 5 ====
First Round
3	(China) Ding N	11	11	11	11
(Turkey) S He	8	8	8	8
Q	(Italy) D Vivarelli	6	8	5	4
45	(Spain) F Zhu	11	11	11	11
50	(Belarus) Ve Pavlovich	8	11	8	11	8	11	9
(Malaysia) Beh L W	11	7	11	4	11	7	11
Q	(Czech Republic) K Penkavova	7	13	5	12	6	10
31	(Romania) D Dodean	11	11	11	10	11	12
23	(South Korea) Yang H-E	11	11	11	11
(Poland) K Stefanska	6	8	4	5
(Croatia) C Molnar	5	10	7	11	6
63	(Poland) N Partyka	11	12	11	8	11
54	(Japan) A Tanioka	11	10	10	11	11	11
Q	(India) M Das	7	12	12	4	7	6
Q	(Romania) C Hirici	7	9	8	6
10	(Japan) K Ishikawa	11	11	11	11

Second Round
3	(China) Ding N	11	11	11	11
45	(Spain) F Zhu	4	6	7	7
(Malaysia) Beh L W	11	11	11	11
31	(Romania) D Dodean	8	8	9	4
23	(South Korea) Yang H-E	9	11	11	11	11
63	(Poland) N Partyka	11	5	6	5	6
54	(Japan) A Tanioka	7	2	4	10
10	(Japan) K Ishikawa	11	11	11	12

Third Round
3	(China) Ding N	11	11	11	11
(Malaysia) Beh L W	9	2	7	9
23	(South Korea) Yang H-E	8	5	8	11	11	8
10	(Japan) K Ishikawa	11	11	11	9	8	11

Fourth Round
3	(China) Ding N	11	11	11	11	11
10	(Japan) K Ishikawa	4	6	13	3	2

==== Section 6 ====
First Round
14	(Hong Kong) Tie Y N	11	11	11	11
Q	(Bulgaria) S Remzi	4	6	4	4
Q	(United States) L Zhang	11	7	3	11	0
43	(Czech Republic) I Vacenovska	13	11	11	2	11
34	(Hungary) G Póta	11	11	11	11
Q	(Netherlands) Y Timina	7	4	8	7
Q	(Egypt) N El-Dawlatly	1	2	4	3
28	(Turkey) M Hu	11	11	11	11
24	(Singapore) Yu M	8	12	5	9	12	11	11
(Croatia) Y Tian	11	10	11	11	10	3	8
Q	(United States) A Hsing	3	11	9	7
37	(Luxembourg) X L Ni	11	11	11	11
53	(Czech Republic) R Strbikova	11	9	9	7	11	8
(Slovakia) E Ódorová	8	11	11	11	4	11
(Romania) B Szocs	11	8	10	11	3	4
6	(Singapore) Feng T	9	11	12	8	11	11

Second Round
14	(Hong Kong) Tie Y N	11	11	11	11
43	(Czech Republic) I Vacenovska	7	6	6	6
34	(Hungary) G Póta	8	12	5	2	11	3
28	(Turkey) M Hu	11	10	11	11	5	11
24	(Singapore) Yu M	11	8	11	7	11	11
37	(Luxembourg) X L Ni	8	11	6	11	8	7
(Slovakia) E Ódorová	3	9	5	7
6	(Singapore) Feng T	11	11	11	11

Third Round
14	(Hong Kong) Tie Y N	8	11	11	11	11	11
28	(Turkey) M Hu	11	4	3	8	13	4
24	(Singapore) Yu M	4	3	1	3
6	(Singapore) Feng T	11	11	11	11

Fourth Round
14	(Hong Kong) Tie Y N	11	4	7	9	11	11	13
6	(Singapore) Feng T	6	11	11	11	8	6	15

==== Section 7 ====
First Round
5	(China) Liu S	11	11	11	11
(Netherlands) E Timna	4	5	8	5
Q	(Turkey) F Ozler	11	5	8	7	9
52	(Ukraine) M Pesotska	9	11	11	11	11
47	(Hong Kong) Lau S-f	DQ
(Portugal) M Xiao
(Republic of the Congo) F Yang	3	7	5	2
29	(Poland) Q Li	11	11	11	11
19	(Hong Kong) Jiang H	11	11	11	11
(Russia) Y Prokhorova	5	8	9	4
Q	(Belarus) A Dubkova	5	3	3	3
41	(Japan) M Wakamiya	11	11	11	11
38	(South Korea) Moon H-J	11	7	11	12	11
Q	(Sweden) M Pettersson	9	11	3	10	7
(South Korea) Park Y-S	11	11	4	7	6	9
12	(Singapore) Wang Y	9	9	11	11	11	11

Second Round
5	(China) Liu S	11	11	11	11
52	(Ukraine) M Pesotska	4	4	4	8
(Portugal) M Xiao	8	4	7	1
29	(Poland) Q Li	11	11	11	11
19	(Hong Kong) Jiang H	7	11	11	11	11
41	(Japan) M Wakamiya	11	3	8	9	6
38	(South Korea) Moon H-J	6	5	11	8	4
12	(Singapore) Wang Y	11	11	8	11	11

Third Round
5	(China) Liu S	11	11	11	11
29	(Poland) Q Li	9	4	8	7
19	(Hong Kong) Jiang H	12	10	6	11	11	11
12	(Singapore) Wang Y	10	12	11	8	6	6

Fourth Round
5	(China) Liu S	11	11	11	11
19	(Hong Kong) Jiang H	5	4	7	4

==== Section 8 ====
First Round
16	(South Korea) Park M-Y	8	4	9	11	11	11	11
(Croatia) T Boroš	11	11	11	6	4	5	8
Q	(India) P Ghatak	10	5	1	9
35	(Japan) H Fujii	12	11	11	11
61	(France) Y F Xian	15	8	11	13	11
Q	(Poland) K Grzybowska	13	11	7	11	7
Q	(Belarus) A Privalova	6	9	10	1
25	(Netherlands) Jie Li	11	11	12	11
30	(Singapore) Sun B	11	11	11	11	11
Q	(Slovenia) J Tomazini	5	13	4	4	9
Q	(Israel) M Kravchenko	7	7	9	3
39	(Hong Kong) Lee H C	11	11	11	11
36	(Romania) E Samara	11	11	11	11
Q	(Switzerland) M Führer	6	3	8	5
Q	(Bulgaria) K Gatinska	6	6	3	4
2	(China) Guo Yan	11	11	11	11

Second Round
16	(South Korea) Park M-Y	11	8	10	6	11	5
35	(Japan) H Fujii	4	11	12	11	1	11
61	(France) Y F Xian	9	7	4	6
25	(Netherlands) Jie Li	11	11	11	11
30	(Singapore) Sun B	15	11	11	12
39	(Hong Kong) Lee H C	13	8	3	10
36	(Romania) E Samara	2	7	6	9
2	(China) Guo Yan	11	11	11	11

Third Round
35	(Japan) H Fujii	10	11	7	11	3	10
25	(Netherlands) Jie Li	12	6	11	8	11	12
30	(Singapore) Sun B	10	6	11	10	5
2	(China) Guo Yan	12	11	7	12	11

Fourth Round
25	(Netherlands) Jie Li	6	7	6	4
2	(China) Guo Yan	11	11	11	11
