= 2012 World Team Table Tennis Championships – Women's team =

2012 women's team

The women's team tournament of the 2012 World Team Table Tennis Championships was held from March 25 to April 1, 2012 at Dortmund, Germany. The draw was held on February 22.

China won the final, beating Singapore 3–0.

== Medalists ==
Event	Gold	Silver	Bronze
Team	China; Ding Ning; Liu Shiwen; Guo Yan; Li Xiaoxia; Guo Yue	Singapore; Feng Tianwei; Wang Yuegu; Li Jiawei; Sun Beibei; Yu Mengyu	Hong Kong; Tie Ya Na; Jiang Huajun; Lee Ho Ching; Ng Wing Nam; Yu Kwok See
Team	China; Ding Ning; Liu Shiwen; Guo Yan; Li Xiaoxia; Guo Yue	Singapore; Feng Tianwei; Wang Yuegu; Li Jiawei; Sun Beibei; Yu Mengyu	South Korea; Kim Kyung-Ah; Park Mi-Young; Seok Ha-Jung; Yang Ha-Eun; Dang Ye-Seo

== Championship division ==
=== Players list ===
Team	Ranking	Group	Players
China	1	A	Ding Ning · Liu Shiwen · Guo Yan · Li Xiaoxia · Guo Yue
Singapore	2	B	Feng Tianwei · Wang Yuegu · Li Jiawei · Sun Beibei · Yu Mengyu
Japan	3	C	Kasumi Ishikawa · Ai Fukuhara · Sayaka Hirano · Hiroko Fujii · Yuka Ishigaki
Hong Kong	4	D	Tie Ya Na · Jiang Huajun · Lee Ho Ching · Ng Wing Nam · Yu Kwok See
South Korea	5	D	Kim Kyung-Ah · Park Mi-Young · Seok Ha-Jung · Yang Ha-Eun · Dang Ye-Seo
Germany	6	C	Wu Jiaduo · Irene Ivancan · Zhenqi Barthel · Kristin Silbereisen · Sabine Winter
Netherlands	7	B	Li Jiao · Li Jie · Elena Timina · Linda Creemers · Britt Eerland
Romania	8	A	Elizabeta Samara · Daniela Dodean · Bernadette Szőcs · Camelia Postoaca · Andrada Vincze
Hungary	9	A	Georgina Póta · Petra Lovas · Krisztina Tóth · Szandra Pergel
Chinese Taipei	10	B	Huang Yi-hua · Cheng I-ching · Chen Szu-yu · Lin Chia-hui · Cheng Hsien-tzu
Russia	11	D	Anna Tikhomirova · Svetlana Ganina · Oksana Fadeyeva · Yana Noskova · Polina Mikhailova
Poland	12	C	Li Qian · Natalia Partyka · Katarzyna Grzybowska · Kinga Stefanska · Magdalena Szczerkowska
Spain	13	C	Shen Yanfei · Zhu Fang · Sara Ramirez · Galia Dvorak
Czech Republic	14	D	Iveta Vacenovská · Renata Štrbiková · Dana Hadačová · Katerina Penkavova · Hana Matelova
Belarus	15	A	Viktoria Pavlovich · Veronika Pavlovich · Alexandra Privalova · Elena Dubkova · Katsiaryna Baravok
Turkey	16	B	Melek Hu · Fulya Yildirim · Gokcenur Gungor · Ipek Karahan
Ukraine	17	A	Margaryta Pesotska · Tetyana Bilenko · Ganna Gaponova · Ievgeniia Vasylieva
North Korea	18	B	Kim Jong · Kim Hye-Song · Ri Mi-Gyong · Ri Myong-Sun
Austria	19	D	Liu Jia · Li Qiangbing · Sarah Kainz · Elena Waggermayer
Serbia	20	C	Gabriela Feher · Ana-Maria Erdelji · Andrea Todorović · Monika Molnar
France	21	C	Carole Grundisch · Yi Fang Xian · Alice Abbat · Emmanuelle Lennon
Croatia	23	D	Tamara Boroš · Cornelia Molnar · Yuan Tian · Ivana Tubikaneć · Petra Petek
United States	25	A	Ariel Hsing · Lily Zhang · Judy Hugh · Erica Wu · Gao Jun
Sweden	30	B	Matilda Ekholm · Linda Bergstrom · Daniela Moskovits · Jennifer Jonsson

=== Preliminary round ===
==== Group A ====
Team	Pld	W	L	GW	GL	Pts
China	5	5	0	15	0	10
Romania	5	4	1	12	10	9
Hungary	5	2	3	9	9	7
Ukraine	5	2	3	10	12	7
Belarus	5	2	3	8	12	7
United States	5	0	5	4	15	5

25 March 2012; 10:00	Report	China	3–0	Belarus	Westfalenhallen, Dortmund
Score by game:
Ding Ning	3–0	Veronika Pavlovich
Li Xiaoxia	3–0	Viktoria Pavlovich
Guo Yue	3–0	Alexandra Privalova

25 March 2012; 10:00	Report	United States	1–3	Romania	Westfalenhallen, Dortmund
Score by game:
Ariel Hsing	0–3	Elizabeta Samara
Lily Zhang	3–2	Daniela Dodean
Erica Wu	0–3	Bernadette Szőcs
Ariel Hsing	2–3	Daniela Dodean

25 March 2012; 10:00	Report	Hungary	1–3	Ukraine	Westfalenhallen, Dortmund
Score by game:
Georgina Póta	3–0	Tetyana Bilenko
Krisztina Tóth	0–3	Margaryta Pesotska
Petra Lovas	2–3	Ganna Gaponova
Georgina Póta	2–3	Margaryta Pesotska

26 March 2012; 13:00	Report	China	3–0	Ukraine	Westfalenhallen, Dortmund
Score by game:
Li Xiaoxia	3–0	Tetyana Bilenko
Ding Ning	3–0	Ganna Gaponova
Guo Yan	3–0	Ievgeniia Vasylieva

26 March 2012; 16:00	Report	Romania	3–2	Hungary	Westfalenhallen, Dortmund
26 March 2012; 16:00	Report	Score by game:			Westfalenhallen, Dortmund
26 March 2012; 16:00	Report	Elizabeta Samara	1–3	Georgina Póta	Westfalenhallen, Dortmund
Daniela Dodean			3–0	Petra Lovas
Bernadette Szőcs			2–3	Szandra Pergel
Daniela Dodean			3–0	Georgina Póta
Elizabeta Samara			3–0	Petra Lovas
			–

26 March 2012; 13:00	Report	Belarus	3–1	United States	Westfalenhallen, Dortmund
Score by game:
Viktoria Pavlovich	3–1	Ariel Hsing
Alexandra Privalova	0–3	Lily Zhang
Elena Dubkova	3–0	Judy Hugh
Viktoria Pavlovich	3–0	Lily Zhang

27 March 2012; 16:00	Report	Hungary	0–3	China	Westfalenhallen, Dortmund
Score by game:
Petra Lovas	0–3	Guo Yue
Krisztina Tóth	0–3	Guo Yan
Szandra Pergel	0–3	Li Xiaoxia

27 March 2012; 16:00	Report	Romania	3–2	Belarus	Westfalenhallen, Dortmund
27 March 2012; 16:00	Report	Score by game:			Westfalenhallen, Dortmund
27 March 2012; 16:00	Report	Daniela Dodean	3–0	Veronika Pavlovich	Westfalenhallen, Dortmund
Elizabeta Samara			1–3	Viktoria Pavlovich
Bernadette Szőcs			3–0	Alexandra Privalova
Daniela Dodean			0–3	Viktoria Pavlovich
Elizabeta Samara			3–1	Veronika Pavlovich
			–

27 March 2012; 16:00	Report	United States	2–3	Ukraine	Westfalenhallen, Dortmund
27 March 2012; 16:00	Report	Score by game:			Westfalenhallen, Dortmund
27 March 2012; 16:00	Report	Gao Jun	3–0	Ganna Gaponova	Westfalenhallen, Dortmund
Ariel Hsing			0–3	Margaryta Pesotska
Erica Wu			0–3	Tetyana Bilenko
Gao Jun			3–0	Margaryta Pesotska
Ariel Hsing			1–3	Ganna Gaponova
			–

28 March 2012; 10:00	Report	China	3–0	Romania	Westfalenhallen, Dortmund
Score by game:
Ding Ning	3–1	Bernadette Szőcs
Guo Yue	3–0	Daniela Dodean
Li Xiaoxia	3–0	Camelia Postoaca

28 March 2012; 10:00	Report	United States	0–3	Hungary	Westfalenhallen, Dortmund
Score by game:
Ariel Hsing	0–3	Petra Lovas
Lily Zhang	2–3	Georgina Póta
Judy Hugh	0–3	Krisztina Tóth

28 March 2012; 10:00	Report	Ukraine	2–3	Belarus	Westfalenhallen, Dortmund
28 March 2012; 10:00	Report	Score by game:			Westfalenhallen, Dortmund
28 March 2012; 10:00	Report	Margaryta Pesotska	3–1	Viktoria Pavlovich	Westfalenhallen, Dortmund
Tetyana Bilenko			2–3	Veronika Pavlovich
Ganna Gaponova			1–3	Alexandra Privalova
Margaryta Pesotska			3–2	Veronika Pavlovich
Tetyana Bilenko			0–3	Viktoria Pavlovich
			–

28 March 2012; 16:00	Report	China	3–0	United States	Westfalenhallen, Dortmund
Score by game:
Guo Yan	3–0	Ariel Hsing
Guo Yue	3–0	Lily Zhang
Liu Shiwen	3–0	Erica Wu

28 March 2012; 16:00	Report	Romania	3–2	Ukraine	Westfalenhallen, Dortmund
28 March 2012; 16:00	Report	Score by game:			Westfalenhallen, Dortmund
28 March 2012; 16:00	Report	Daniela Dodean	3–1	Ganna Gaponova	Westfalenhallen, Dortmund
Elizabeta Samara			2–3	Margaryta Pesotska
Bernadette Szőcs			3–2	Tetyana Bilenko
Daniela Dodean			2–3	Margaryta Pesotska
Elizabeta Samara			3–0	Ganna Gaponova
			–

28 March 2012; 16:00	Report	Belarus	0–3	Hungary	Westfalenhallen, Dortmund
Score by game:
Viktoria Pavlovich	2–3	Georgina Póta
Elena Dubkova	1–3	Petra Lovas
Veronika Pavlovich	1–3	Krisztina Tóth

==== Group B ====
Team	Pld	W	L	GW	GL	Pts
Singapore	5	5	0	15	1	10
Netherlands	5	4	1	13	6	9
North Korea	5	3	2	11	8	8
Sweden	5	2	3	6	12	7
Chinese Taipei	5	1	4	8	12	6
Turkey	5	0	5	1	15	5

25 March 2012; 17:00	Report	Singapore	3–0	Turkey	Westfalenhallen, Dortmund
Score by game:
Feng Tianwei	3–0	Fulya Yildirim
Wang Yuegu	3–1	Melek Hu
Li Jiawei	3–1	Gokcenur Gungor

25 March 2012; 17:00	Report	Sweden	0–3	Netherlands	Westfalenhallen, Dortmund
Score by game:
Jennifer Jonsson	0–3	Li Jiao
Daniela Moskovits	0–3	Li Jie
Linda Bergstrom	1–3	Elena Timina

25 March 2012; 17:00	Report	Chinese Taipei	2–3	North Korea	Westfalenhallen, Dortmund
25 March 2012; 17:00	Report	Score by game:			Westfalenhallen, Dortmund
25 March 2012; 17:00	Report	Huang Yi-hua	2–3	Ri Myong-Sun	Westfalenhallen, Dortmund
Cheng I-ching			3–0	Kim Jong
Chen Szu-yu			3–1	Ri Mi-Gyong
Huang Yi-hua			2–3	Kim Jong
Cheng I-ching			2–3	Ri Myong-Sun
			–

26 March 2012; 10:00	Report	Singapore	3–0	North Korea	Westfalenhallen, Dortmund
Score by game:
Feng Tianwei	3–1	Ri Myong-Sun
Wang Yuegu	3–0	Ri Mi-Gyong
Li Jiawei	3–1	Kim Jong

26 March 2012; 10:00	Report	Netherlands	3–1	Chinese Taipei	Westfalenhallen, Dortmund
Score by game:
Li Jiao	3–0	Cheng I-ching
Li Jie	3–1	Huang Yi-hua
Elena Timina	2–3	Chen Szu-yu
Li Jiao	3–0	Huang Yi-hua

26 March 2012; 10:00	Report	Turkey	1–3	Sweden	Westfalenhallen, Dortmund
Score by game:
Melek Hu	3–0	Jennifer Jonsson
Fulya Yildirim	0–3	Matilda Ekholm
Gokcenur Gungor	1–3	Linda Bergstrom
Melek Hu	0–3	Matilda Ekholm

27 March 2012; 10:00	Report	Singapore	3–0	Chinese Taipei	Westfalenhallen, Dortmund
Score by game:
Feng Tianwei	3–0	Chen Szu-yu
Wang Yuegu	3–2	Cheng I-ching
Li Jiawei	3–1	Lin Chia-hui

27 March 2012; 10:00	Report	Turkey	0–3	Netherlands	Westfalenhallen, Dortmund
Score by game:
Fulya Yildirim	0–3	Li Jie
Melek Hu	1–3	Li Jiao
Ipek Karahan	0–3	Linda Creemers

27 March 2012; 10:00	Report	Sweden	0–3	North Korea	Westfalenhallen, Dortmund
Score by game:
Daniela Moskovits	0–3	Ri Myong-Sun
Matilda Ekholm	0–3	Kim Jong
Linda Bergstrom	0–3	Kim Hye-Song

28 March 2012; 10:00	Report	Singapore	3–1	Netherlands	Westfalenhallen, Dortmund
Score by game:
Feng Tianwei	2–3	Li Jiao
Wang Yuegu	3–2	Li Jie
Li Jiawei	3–0	Linda Creemers
Feng Tianwei	3–1	Li Jie

28 March 2012; 10:00	Report	Chinese Taipei	2–3	Sweden	Westfalenhallen, Dortmund
28 March 2012; 10:00	Report	Score by game:			Westfalenhallen, Dortmund
28 March 2012; 10:00	Report	Huang Yi-hua	1–3	Matilda Ekholm	Westfalenhallen, Dortmund
Cheng I-ching			3–0	Daniela Moskovits
Chen Szu-yu			3–0	Jennifer Jonsson
Huang Yi-hua			2–3	Daniela Moskovits
Cheng I-ching			2–3	Matilda Ekholm
			–

28 March 2012; 10:00	Report	North Korea	3–0	Turkey	Westfalenhallen, Dortmund
Score by game:
Kim Jong	3–0	Gokcenur Gungor
Ri Myong-Sun	3–0	Fulya Yildirim
Kim Hye-Song	3–0	Ipek Karahan

28 March 2012; 16:00	Report	Singapore	3–0	Sweden	Westfalenhallen, Dortmund
Score by game:
Feng Tianwei	3–0	Jennifer Jonsson
Wang Yuegu	3–0	Linda Bergstrom
Li Jiawei	3–0	Daniela Moskovits

28 March 2012; 16:00	Report	Netherlands	3–2	North Korea	Westfalenhallen, Dortmund
28 March 2012; 16:00	Report	Score by game:			Westfalenhallen, Dortmund
28 March 2012; 16:00	Report	Li Jiao	3–0	Ri Myong-Sun	Westfalenhallen, Dortmund
Li Jie			3–0	Kim Jong
Elena Timina			2–3	Kim Hye-Song
Li Jiao			1–3	Kim Jong
Li Jie			3–0	Ri Myong-Sun
			–

28 March 2012; 16:00	Report	Turkey	0–3	Chinese Taipei	Westfalenhallen, Dortmund
Score by game:
Fulya Yildirim	0–3	Chen Szu-yu
Gokcenur Gungor	0–3	Cheng I-ching
Ipek Karahan	0–3	Lin Chia-hui

==== Group C ====
Team	Pld	W	L	GW	GL	Pts
Japan	5	5	0	15	3	10
Germany	5	4	1	12	8	9
Poland	5	3	2	10	7	8
Spain	5	2	3	10	12	7
Serbia	5	1	4	8	14	6
France	5	0	5	4	15	5

25 March 2012; 10:00	Report	Spain	1–3	Japan	Westfalenhallen, Dortmund
Score by game:
Sara Ramirez	0–3	Ai Fukuhara
Shen Yanfei	3–2	Kasumi Ishikawa
Zhu Fang	1–3	Sayaka Hirano
Sara Ramirez	0–3	Kasumi Ishikawa

25 March 2012; 10:00	Report	Germany	3–0	France	Westfalenhallen, Dortmund
Score by game:
Wu Jiaduo	3–0	Alice Abbat
Kristin Silbereisen	3–1	Carole Grundisch
Irene Ivancan	3–0	Yi Fang Xian

25 March 2012; 10:00	Report	Serbia	0–3	Poland	Westfalenhallen, Dortmund
Score by game:
Gabriela Feher	0–3	Natalia Partyka
Ana-Maria Erdelji	0–3	Li Qian
Andrea Todorovic	0–3	Katarzyna Grzybowska

25 March 2012; 17:00	Report	Japan	3–1	Serbia	Westfalenhallen, Dortmund
Score by game:
Sayaka Hirano	3–0	Ana-Maria Erdelji
Ai Fukuhara	3–0	Gabriela Feher
Hiroko Fujii	2–3	Monika Molnar
Sayaka Hirano	3–0	Gabriela Feher

25 March 2012; 17:00	Report	Germany	3–1	Poland	Westfalenhallen, Dortmund
Score by game:
Wu Jiaduo	1–3	Li Qian
Irene Ivancan	3–1	Natalia Partyka
Kristin Silbereisen	3–0	Katarzyna Grzybowska
Wu Jiaduo	3–1	Natalia Partyka

25 March 2012; 17:00	Report	Spain	3–1	France	Westfalenhallen, Dortmund
Score by game:
Shen Yanfei	3–1	Carole Grundisch
Sara Ramirez	2–3	Yi Fang Xian
Galia Dvorak	3–1	Alice Abbat
Shen Yanfei	3–0	Yi Fang Xian

26 March 2012; 13:00	Report	Japan	3–0	Poland	Westfalenhallen, Dortmund
Score by game:
Ai Fukuhara	3–0	Magdalena Szczerkowska
Sayaka Hirano	3–2	Katarzyna Grzybowska
Kasumi Ishikawa	3–2	Natalia Partyka

26 March 2012; 16:00	Report	Spain	2–3	Germany	Westfalenhallen, Dortmund
26 March 2012; 16:00	Report	Score by game:			Westfalenhallen, Dortmund
26 March 2012; 16:00	Report	Shen Yanfei	3–0	Kristin Silbereisen	Westfalenhallen, Dortmund
Galia Dvorak			0–3	Wu Jiaduo
Sara Ramirez			3–1	Zhenqi Barthel
Shen Yanfei			2–3	Wu Jiaduo
Galia Dvorak			1–3	Kristin Silbereisen
			–

26 March 2012; 16:00	Report	France	2–3	Serbia	Westfalenhallen, Dortmund
26 March 2012; 16:00	Report	Score by game:			Westfalenhallen, Dortmund
26 March 2012; 16:00	Report	Carole Grundisch	3–0	Monika Molnar	Westfalenhallen, Dortmund
Yi Fang Xian			2–3	Gabriela Feher
Alice Abbat			0–3	Ana-Maria Erdelji
Carole Grundisch			3–1	Gabriela Feher
Yi Fang Xian			0–3	Monika Molnar
			–

27 March 2012; 16:00	Report	Japan	3–0	Germany	Westfalenhallen, Dortmund
Score by game:
Kasumi Ishikawa	3–1	Kristin Silbereisen
Ai Fukuhara	3–0	Wu Jiaduo
Sayaka Hirano	3–0	Irene Ivancan

27 March 2012; 16:00	Report	Poland	3–0	France	Westfalenhallen, Dortmund
Score by game:
Li Qian	3–0	Alice Abbat
Natalia Partyka	3–2	Carole Grundisch
Magdalena Szczerkowska	3–0	Emmanuelle Lennon

27 March 2012; 16:00	Report	Serbia	2–3	Spain	Westfalenhallen, Dortmund
27 March 2012; 16:00	Report	Score by game:			Westfalenhallen, Dortmund
27 March 2012; 16:00	Report	Gabriela Feher	3–0	Sara Ramirez	Westfalenhallen, Dortmund
Ana-Maria Erdelji			0–3	Shen Yanfei
Monika Molnar			3–2	Zhu Fang
Gabriela Feher			0–3	Shen Yanfei
Ana-Maria Erdelji			1–3	Sara Ramirez
			–

28 March 2012; 13:00	Report	France	1–3	Japan	Westfalenhallen, Dortmund
Score by game:
Alice Abbat	0–3	Kasumi Ishikawa
Carole Grundisch	3–1	Hiroko Fujii
Emmanuelle Lennon	0–3	Yuka Ishigaki
Alice Abbat	0–3	Hiroko Fujii

28 March 2012; 13:00	Report	Serbia	2–3	Germany	Westfalenhallen, Dortmund
28 March 2012; 13:00	Report	Score by game:			Westfalenhallen, Dortmund
28 March 2012; 13:00	Report	Gabriela Feher	3–2	Zhenqi Barthel	Westfalenhallen, Dortmund
Monika Molnar			0–3	Sabine Winter
Andrea Todorović			1–3	Kristin Silbereisen
Gabriela Feher			3–2	Sabine Winter
Monika Molnar			2–3	Zhenqi Barthel
			–

28 March 2012; 13:00	Report	Spain	1–3	Poland	Westfalenhallen, Dortmund
Score by game:
Shen Yanfei	0–3	Katarzyna Grzybowska
Sara Ramirez	1–3	Li Qian
Galia Dvorak	3–2	Natalia Partyka
Shen Yanfei	0–3	Li Qian

==== Group D ====
Team	Pld	W	L	GW	GL	Pts
Hong Kong	5	4	1	14	9	9
South Korea	5	4	1	14	5	9
Austria	5	3	2	11	7	8
Czech Republic	5	2	3	10	12	7
Croatia	5	1	4	4	14	6
Russia	5	1	4	8	14	6

25 March 2012; 17:00	Report	Czech Republic	2–3	Hong Kong	Westfalenhallen, Dortmund
25 March 2012; 17:00	Report	Score by game:			Westfalenhallen, Dortmund
25 March 2012; 17:00	Report	Iveta Vacenovská	3–0	Jiang Huajun	Westfalenhallen, Dortmund
Dana Hadačová			1–3	Tie Ya Na
Renata Strbikova			3–2	Lee Ho Ching
Iveta Vacenovská			1–3	Tie Ya Na
Dana Hadačová			0–3	Jiang Huajun
			–

25 March 2012; 17:00	Report	South Korea	3–0	Croatia	Westfalenhallen, Dortmund
Score by game:
Kim Kyung-Ah	3–0	Ivana Tubikanec
Seok Ha-Jung	3–0	Yuan Tian
Park Mi-Young	3–0	Petra Petek

25 March 2012; 17:00	Report	Russia	0–3	Austria	Westfalenhallen, Dortmund
Score by game:
Anna Tikhomirova	2–3	Li Qiangbing
Polina Mikhailova	0–3	Liu Jia
Svetlana Ganina	2–3	Elena Waggermayer

26 March 2012; 13:00	Report	Hong Kong	3–2	Austria	Westfalenhallen, Dortmund
26 March 2012; 13:00	Report	Score by game:			Westfalenhallen, Dortmund
26 March 2012; 13:00	Report	Tie Ya Na	3–0	Elena Waggermayer	Westfalenhallen, Dortmund
Jiang Huajun			1–3	Liu Jia
Lee Ho Ching			0–3	Li Qiangbing
Tie Ya Na			3–2	Liu Jia
Jiang Huajun			3–1	Elena Waggermayer
			–

26 March 2012; 13:00	Report	South Korea	3–1	Russia	Westfalenhallen, Dortmund
Score by game:
Kim Kyung-Ah	1–3	Anna Tikhomirova
Dang Ye-Seo	3–0	Oksana Fadeyeva
Yang Ha-Eun	3–0	Polina Mikhailova
Dang Ye-Seo	3–2	Anna Tikhomirova

26 March 2012; 13:00	Report	Czech Republic	3–1	Croatia	Westfalenhallen, Dortmund
Score by game:
Iveta Vacenovská	3–0	Cornelia Molnar
Renata Štrbiková	3–2	Tamara Boroš
Dana Hadačová	2–3	Yuan Tian
Iveta Vacenovská	3–1	Tamara Boroš

27 March 2012; 10:00	Report	Russia	3–2	Hong Kong	Westfalenhallen, Dortmund
27 March 2012; 10:00	Report	Score by game:			Westfalenhallen, Dortmund
27 March 2012; 10:00	Report	Anna Tikhomirova	3–1	Jiang Huajun	Westfalenhallen, Dortmund
Oksana Fadeyeva			0–3	Tie Ya Na
Yana Noskova			3–2	Ng Wing Nam
Anna Tikhomirova			1–3	Tie Ya Na
Oksana Fadeyeva			3–0	Jiang Huajun
			–

27 March 2012; 10:00	Report	Czech Republic	1–3	South Korea	Westfalenhallen, Dortmund
Score by game:
Iveta Vacenovská	3–2	Park Mi-Young
Katerina Penkavova	2–3	Seok Ha-Jung
Renata Štrbiková	1–3	Kim Kyung-Ah
Iveta Vacenovská	1–3	Seok Ha-Jung

27 March 2012; 10:00	Report	Austria	3–0	Croatia	Westfalenhallen, Dortmund
Score by game:
Liu Jia	3–0	Cornelia Molnar
Li Qiangbing	3–0	Yuan Tian
Elena Waggermayer	3–2	Ivana Tubikaneć

28 March 2012; 10:00	Report	Hong Kong	3–2	South Korea	Westfalenhallen, Dortmund
28 March 2012; 10:00	Report	Score by game:			Westfalenhallen, Dortmund
28 March 2012; 10:00	Report	Tie Ya Na	3–0	Dang Ye-Seo	Westfalenhallen, Dortmund
Jiang Huajun			3–1	Seok Ha-Jung
Ng Wing Nam			0–3	Kim Kyung-Ah
Tie Ya Na			2–3	Seok Ha-Jung
Jiang Huajun			3–1	Dang Ye-Seo
			–

28 March 2012; 10:00	Report	Russia	2–3	Croatia	Westfalenhallen, Dortmund
28 March 2012; 10:00	Report	Score by game:			Westfalenhallen, Dortmund
28 March 2012; 10:00	Report	Anna Tikhomirova	3–0	Yuan Tian	Westfalenhallen, Dortmund
Oksana Fadeyeva			0–3	Tamara Boroš
Yana Noskova			1–3	Cornelia Molnar
Anna Tikhomirova			3–0	Tamara Boroš
Oksana Fadeyeva			0–3	Yuan Tian
			–

28 March 2012; 10:00	Report	Czech Republic	1–3	Austria	Westfalenhallen, Dortmund
Score by game:
Iveta Vacenovská	0–3	Li Qiangbing
Renata Štrbiková	0–3	Liu Jia
Katerina Penkavova	3–0	Elena Waggermayer
Iveta Vacenovská	0–3	Liu Jia

28 March 2012; 16:00	Report	Croatia	0–3	Hong Kong	Westfalenhallen, Dortmund
Score by game:
Cornelia Molnar	2–3	Jiang Huajun
Tamara Boroš	1–3	Tie Ya Na
Yuan Tian	1–3	Lee Ho Ching

28 March 2012; 16:00	Report	South Korea	3–0	Austria	Westfalenhallen, Dortmund
Score by game:
Seok Ha-Jung	3–2	Li Qiangbing
Kim Kyung-Ah	3–0	Elena Waggermayer
Park Mi-Young	3–1	Sarah Kainz

28 March 2012; 16:00	Report	Russia	2–3	Czech Republic	Westfalenhallen, Dortmund
28 March 2012; 16:00	Report	Score by game:			Westfalenhallen, Dortmund
28 March 2012; 16:00	Report	Anna Tikhomirova	3–1	Renata Štrbiková	Westfalenhallen, Dortmund
Yana Noskova			2–3	Iveta Vacenovská
Oksana Fadeyeva			0–3	Dana Hadačová
Anna Tikhomirova			3–0	Iveta Vacenovská
Yana Noskova			1–3	Renata Štrbiková
			–

=== Knockout stage ===
==== Place 1–12 ====
First Round
Poland	3
Romania	2
Netherlands	3
Austria	1
Hungary	0
South Korea	3
Germany	3
North Korea	1
Position 9–12
Romania	2
Austria	3
Hungary	0
North Korea	3

Quarterfinals
China	3
Poland	0
Netherlands	0
Hong Kong	3
Japan	2
South Korea	3
Germany	2
Singapore	3
Position 9–12
Austria	0
North Korea	3
Romania	1
Hungary	3

Semifinals
China	3
Hong Kong	1
South Korea	2
Singapore	3
Position 5–8
Poland	1
Netherlands	3
Japan	3
Germany	0

Final
China	3
Singapore	0
Third Place
Hong Kong	X
South Korea	X
Position 5–8
Netherlands	0
Japan	3
Poland	2
Germany	3

===== First round =====
29 March 2012; 11:00	Report	Poland	3–2	Romania	Westfalenhallen, Dortmund
29 March 2012; 11:00	Report	Score by game:			Westfalenhallen, Dortmund
29 March 2012; 11:00	Report	Katarzyna Grzybowska	0–3	Daniela Dodean	Westfalenhallen, Dortmund
Li Qian			3–1	Elizabeta Samara
Natalia Partyka			3–0	Bernadette Szőcs
Li Qian			1–3	Daniela Dodean
Katarzyna Grzybowska			3–1	Elizabeta Samara
			–

29 March 2012; 11:00	Report	Hungary	0–3	South Korea	Westfalenhallen, Dortmund
Score by game:
Petra Lovas	2–3	Kim Kyung-Ah
Georgina Póta	1–3	Seok Ha-Jung
Krisztina Tóth	2–3	Dang Ye-Seo

29 March 2012; 17:00	Report	Netherlands	3–1	Austria	Westfalenhallen, Dortmund
Score by game:
Li Jie	3–0	Elena Waggermayer
Li Jiao	2–3	Liu Jia
Linda Creemers	3–0	Li Qiangbing
Li Jie	3–1	Liu Jia

29 March 2012; 17:00	Report	Germany	3–1	North Korea	Westfalenhallen, Dortmund
Score by game:
Irene Ivancan	3–1	Kim Jong
Wu Jiaduo	3–1	Kim Hye-Song
Kristin Silbereisen	1–3	Ri Myong-Sun
Wu Jiaduo	3–1	Kim Jong

===== Quarterfinals =====
30 March 2012; 10:00	Report	China	3–0	Poland	Westfalenhallen, Dortmund
Score by game:
Ding Ning	3–0	Natalia Partyka
Li Xiaoxia	3–0	Katarzyna Grzybowska
Guo Yue	3–0	Li Qian

30 March 2012; 13:00	Report	Hong Kong	3–0	Netherlands	Westfalenhallen, Dortmund
Score by game:
Tie Ya Na	3–2	Li Jiao
Jiang Huajun	3–2	Li Jie
Lee Ho Ching	3–1	Elena Timina

30 March 2012; 13:00	Report	Japan	2–3	South Korea	Westfalenhallen, Dortmund
30 March 2012; 13:00	Report	Score by game:			Westfalenhallen, Dortmund
30 March 2012; 13:00	Report	Ai Fukuhara	3–2	Kim Kyung-Ah	Westfalenhallen, Dortmund
Kasumi Ishikawa			3–2	Seok Ha-Jung
Sayaka Hirano			1–3	Dang Ye-Seo
Ai Fukuhara			0–3	Seok Ha-Jung
Kasumi Ishikawa			2–3	Kim Kyung-Ah
			–

30 March 2012; 19:00	Report	Singapore	3–2	Germany	Westfalenhallen, Dortmund
30 March 2012; 19:00	Report	Score by game:			Westfalenhallen, Dortmund
30 March 2012; 19:00	Report	Feng Tianwei	0–3	Irene Ivancan	Westfalenhallen, Dortmund
Wang Yuegu			0–3	Wu Jiaduo
Li Jiawei			3–2	Kristin Silbereisen
Feng Tianwei			3–1	Wu Jiaduo
Wang Yuegu			3–2	Irene Ivancan
			–

===== Semifinals =====
31 March 2012; 10:00	Report	South Korea	2–3	Singapore	Westfalenhallen, Dortmund
31 March 2012; 10:00	Report	Score by game:			Westfalenhallen, Dortmund
31 March 2012; 10:00	Report	Kim Kyung-Ah	3–2	Feng Tianwei	Westfalenhallen, Dortmund
Seok Ha-Jung			2–3	Wang Yuegu
Dang Ye-Seo			3–0	Li Jiawei
Seok Ha-Jung			1–3	Feng Tianwei
Kim Kyung-Ah			2–3	Wang Yuegu
			–

31 March 2012; 16:00	Report	China	3–1	Hong Kong	Westfalenhallen, Dortmund
Score by game:
Ding Ning	3–0	Jiang Huajun
Li Xiaoxia	1–3	Tie Ya Na
Guo Yan	3–0	Yu Kwok See
Li Xiaoxia	3–0	Jiang Huajun

===== Final =====
1 April 2012; 16:00	Report	Singapore	0–3	China	Westfalenhallen, Dortmund
Score by game:
Feng Tianwei	1–3	Ding Ning
Wang Yuegu	1–3	Li Xiaoxia
Li Jiawei	0–3	Guo Yue

==== Place 13–24 bracket ====
First Round
Russia	3
Serbia	2
Belarus	3
Turkey	1
France	2
Chinese Taipei	3
Croatia	3
United States	1
Position 21–24
Serbia	3
Turkey	0
France	3
United States	1

Second Round
Czech Republic	0
Russia	3
Belarus	3
Ukraine	0
Spain	2
Chinese Taipei	3
Croatia	3
Sweden	1
Position 21–24
Serbia	3
France	1
Turkey	0
United States	3

Third Round
Russia	1
Belarus	3
Chinese Taipei	3
Croatia	1
Position 17–20
Czech Republic	3
Ukraine	0
Spain	3
Sweden	0

Position 13–14
Belarus	3
Chinese Taipei	2
Position 15–16
Russia	3
Croatia	0
Position 17–20
Czech Republic	0
Spain	3
Ukraine	3
Sweden	0

== Second division ==
=== Preliminary round ===
==== Group E ====
Team	Pld	W	L	GW	GL	Pts
Israel	5	4	1	14	5	9
India	5	4	1	13	6	9
Italy	5	3	2	11	6	8
England	5	3	2	11	10	8
Nigeria	5	1	4	5	12	6
Estonia	5	0	5	0	15	5

==== Group F ====
Team	Pld	W	L	GW	GL	Pts
Slovakia	5	4	1	14	6	9
Thailand	5	4	1	13	10	9
Bulgaria	5	3	2	11	10	8
Greece	5	3	2	10	11	8
Malaysia	5	1	4	9	14	6
New Zealand	5	0	5	9	15	5

==== Group G ====
Team	Pld	W	L	GW	GL	Pts
Australia	5	4	1	13	7	9
Denmark	5	3	2	13	11	8
Colombia	5	3	2	12	10	8
Egypt	5	3	2	11	8	8
Lithuania	5	2	3	9	11	7
Congo	5	0	5	4	15	5

==== Group H ====
Team	Pld	W	L	GW	GL	Pts
Luxembourg	5	5	0	15	2	10
Portugal	5	3	2	12	8	8
Brazil	5	3	2	10	8	8
Slovenia	5	2	3	8	12	7
Venezuela	5	2	3	8	12	7
Switzerland	5	0	5	4	15	5

=== Knockout stage ===
==== Place 25–36 bracket ====
First Round
Italy	3
Thailand	0
Denmark	3
Bulgaria	1
Colombia	3
Portugal	2
India	3
Brazil	2
Position 33–36
Thailand	0
Bulgaria	3
Portugal	3
Brazil	1

Second Round
Israel	0
Italy	3
Denmark	1
Luxembourg	3
Australia	3
Colombia	2
India	3
Slovakia	2
Position 33–36
Bulgaria	3
Portugal	1
Thailand	3
Brazil	2

Third Round
Italy	0
Luxembourg	3
Australia	3
India	1
Position 29–32
Israel	3
Denmark	1
Colombia	1
Slovakia	3

Position 25–26
Luxembourg	1
Australia	3
Position 27–28
Italy	1
India	3
Position 29–32
Israel	3
Slovakia	1
Denmark	1
Colombia	3

==== Place 37–48 bracket ====
First Round
Estonia	3
Lithuania	1
Malaysia	3
Switzerland	2
Congo	1
Venezuela	3
Nigeria	3
New Zealand	2
Position 45–48
Lithuania	2
Switzerland	3
Congo	3
New Zealand	2

Second Round
Egypt	3
Estonia	1
Malaysia	2
England	3
Greece	1
Venezuela	3
Nigeria	0
Slovenia	3
Position 45–48
Switzerland	3
Congo	2
Lithuania	3
New Zealand	2

Third Round
Egypt	2
England	3
Venezuela	0
Slovenia	3
Position 41–44
Estonia	1
Malaysia	3
Greece	2
Nigeria	3

Position 37–38
England	3
Slovenia	2
Position 39–40
Egypt	3
Venezuela	0
Position 41–44
Malaysia	3
Nigeria	1
Estonia	2
Greece	3

== Third division ==
=== Preliminary round ===
==== Group I ====
Team	Pld	W	L	GW	GL	Pts
Moldova	5	5	0	15	2	10
Wales	5	4	1	13	4	9
Peru	5	3	2	10	9	8
Dominican Republic	5	2	3	8	12	7
Montenegro	5	1	4	6	12	6
Macedonia	5	0	5	2	15	5

==== Group J ====
Team	Pld	W	L	GW	GL	Pts
Chile	5	5	0	15	3	10
Uzbekistan	5	4	1	14	5	9
Puerto Rico	5	3	2	10	7	8
Argentina	5	1	4	4	12	6
Finland	5	1	4	3	12	6
Sri Lanka	5	1	4	5	12	6

==== Group K ====
Team	Pld	W	L	GW	GL	Pts
Canada	5	5	0	15	2	10
Iran	5	4	1	13	6	9
Ireland	5	3	2	10	8	8
Armenia	5	2	3	6	13	7
Mexico	5	1	4	10	13	6
Mongolia	5	0	5	3	15	5

==== Group L ====
Team	Pld	W	L	GW	GL	Pts
Kazakhstan	5	5	0	15	1	10
Bosnia and Herzegovina	5	4	1	13	8	9
Macau	5	3	2	10	12	8
Guatemala	5	2	3	10	12	7
Latvia	5	1	4	6	14	6
Azerbaijan	5	0	5	8	15	5

=== Knockout stage ===
==== Place 49–60 bracket ====
First Round
Puerto Rico	3
Iran	1
Bosnia and Herzegovina	3
Peru	2
Macau	1
Uzbekistan	3
Wales	3
Ireland	1
Position 57–60
Iran	3
Peru	0
Macau	3
Ireland	2

Second Round
Moldova	2
Puerto Rico	3
Bosnia and Herzegovina	3
Canada	1
Kazakhstan	3
Uzbekistan	1
Wales	2
Chile	3
Position 57–60
Iran	3
Macau	0
Peru	1
Ireland	3

Third Round
Puerto Rico	0
Bosnia and Herzegovina	3
Kazakhstan	2
Chile	3
Position 53–56
Moldova	3
Canada	1
Uzbekistan	3
Wales	0

Position 49–50
Bosnia and Herzegovina	0
Chile	3
Position 51–52
Puerto Rico	1
Kazakhstan	3
Position 53–56
Moldova	2
Uzbekistan	3
Canada	0
Wales	3

==== Place 61–72 bracket ====
First Round
Mongolia	1
Latvia	3
Finland	3
Azerbaijan	0
Macedonia	1
Mexico	3
Montenegro	1
Sri Lanka	3
Position 69–72
Mongolia	3
Azerbaijan	2
Macedonia	1
Montenegro	3

Second Round
Argentina	1
Latvia	3
Finland	1
Dominican Republic	3
Guatemala	3
Mexico	1
Sri Lanka	2
Armenia	3
Position 69–72
Mongolia	2
Montenegro	3
Azerbaijan	3
Macedonia	1

Third Round
Latvia	2
Dominican Republic	3
Guatemala	3
Armenia	2
Position 65–68
Argentina	3
Finland	2
Mexico	3
Sri Lanka	1

Position 61–62
Dominican Republic	2
Guatemala	3
Position 63–64
Latvia	0
Armenia	3
Position 65–68
Argentina	3
Mexico	2
Finland	0
Sri Lanka	3

== Fourth division ==
=== Preliminary round ===
==== Group M ====
Team	Pld	W	L	GW	GL	Pts
Norway	4	4	0	12	2	8
Kyrgyzstan	4	3	1	11	3	7
Tajikistan	4	2	2	6	6	6
Isle of Man	4	1	3	3	9	5
Liberia	4	0	4	0	12	4

==== Group N ====
Team	Pld	W	L	GW	GL	Pts
Lebanon	4	4	0	12	3	8
Pakistan	4	3	1	10	6	7
Cyprus	4	2	2	10	7	6
Barbados	4	1	3	5	9	5
Tanzania	4	0	4	0	12	0

==== Group O ====
Team	Pld	W	L	GW	GL	Pts
Trinidad and Tobago	4	4	0	12	4	8
Kosovo	4	3	1	10	5	7
Guernsey	4	2	2	10	7	6
Uganda	4	1	3	3	9	5
Jamaica	4	0	4	2	12	3

==== Group P ====
Team	Pld	W	L	GW	GL	Pts
Syria	4	3	1	9	6	7
Scotland	4	3	1	11	4	7
Qatar	4	2	2	8	10	6
South Africa	4	2	2	8	8	6
Bahrain	4	0	4	4	12	4

=== Knockout stage ===
==== Place 73–84 bracket ====
First Round
Cyprus	0
Kyrgyzstan	3
Kosovo	3
Qatar	1
Tajikistan	3
Pakistan	2
Scotland	3
Guernsey	2
Position 81–84
Cyprus	3
Qatar	2
Pakistan	3
Guernsey	2

Second Round
Syria	1
Kyrgyzstan	3
Kosovo	0
Lebanon	3
Trinidad and Tobago	3
Tajikistan	0
Scotland	0
Norway	3
Position 81–84
Cyprus	3
Pakistan	0
Qatar	2
Guernsey	3

Third Round
Kyrgyzstan	3
Lebanon	1
Trinidad and Tobago	2
Norway	3
Position 77–80
Syria	1
Kosovo	3
Tajikistan	0
Scotland	3

Position 73–74
Kyrgyzstan	3
Norway	1
Position 75–76
Lebanon	1
Trinidad and Tobago	3
Position 77–80
Kosovo	0
Scotland	3
Syria	1
Tajikistan	3

==== Place 85–92 bracket ====
Position 89–90
Isle of Man	2
Jamaica	3
Position 91–92
Tanzania	X
Liberia	X

Position 89–92
Isle of Man	3
Tanzania	0
Liberia	0
Jamaica	3

First Round
Isle of Man	0
Bahrain	3
Tanzania	0
Uganda	3
South Africa	3
Liberia	0
Jamaica	1
Barbados	3

Second Round
Bahrain	3
Uganda	0
South Africa	2
Barbados	3

Position 85–86
Bahrain	3
Barbados	1
Position 87–88
Uganda	0
South Africa	3
