= Table tennis at the 2016 Summer Olympics – Women's singles =

Women's singles table tennis at the Games of the XXXI Olympiad
- Venue: Riocentro
- Date: 6–10 August 2016
- Competitors: 70 from 43 nations

Medalists
1st place, gold medalist(s)		Ding Ning	China
2nd place, silver medalist(s)		Li Xiaoxia	China
3rd place, bronze medalist(s)		Kim Song-i	North Korea

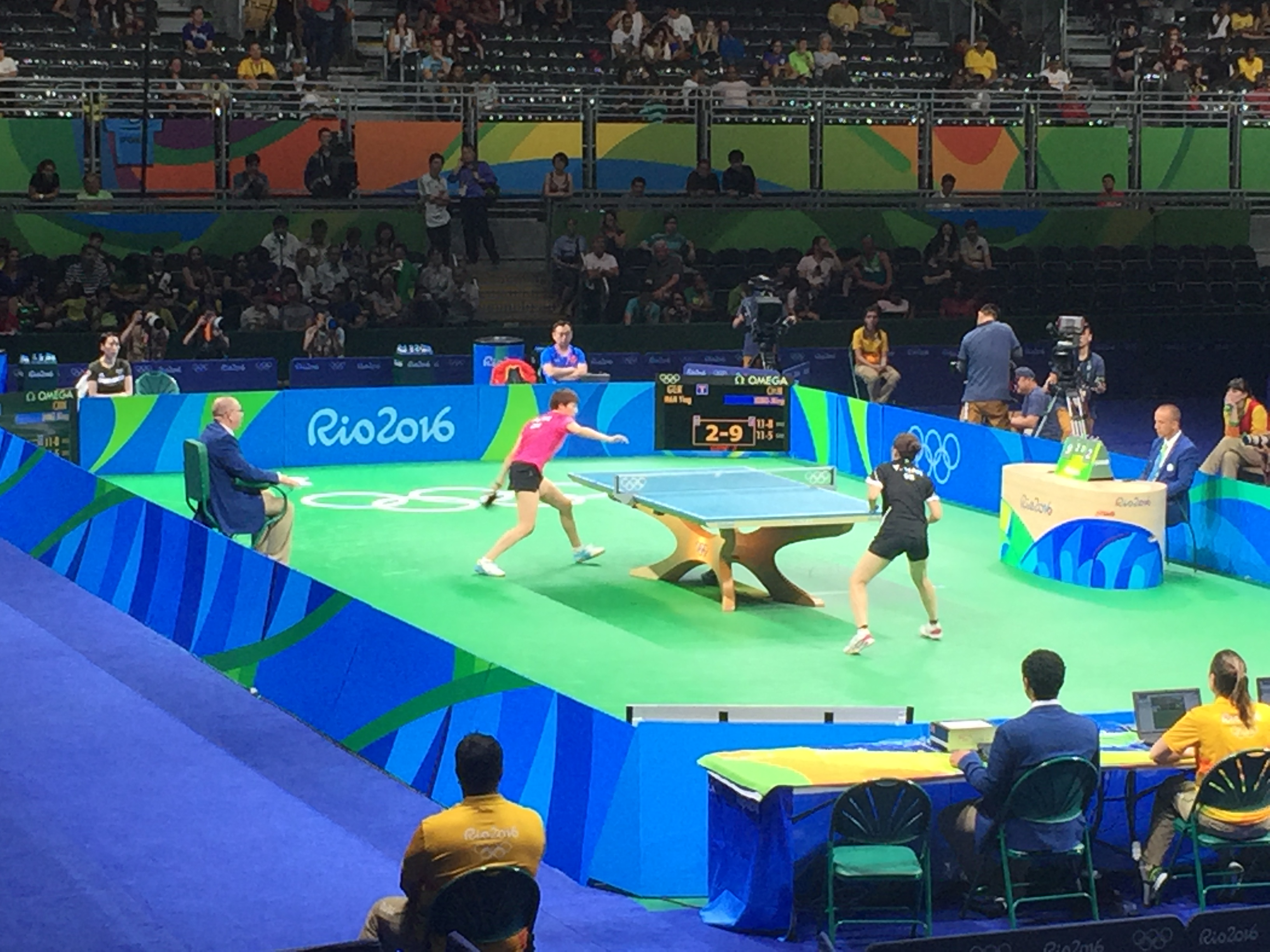
Top seeded Ding Ning met Han Ying in the quarterfinals

The women's singles table tennis event was part of the table tennis programme at the 2016 Summer Olympics in Rio de Janeiro. The event took place from 6 August to 10 August 2016 at Riocentro.

The medals were presented by Ng Ser Miang, IOC member, Singapore and Petra Sörling, Executive Vice President of the ITTF.

== Schedule ==
All times are Brasília Time (UTC−3).

Dates	Start time	Round
6 August	9:00	Preliminary round
6 August	11:15	First round
7 August	09:00	Second round
8 August	10:00	Third round
8 August	17:00	Fourth round
9 August	16:00	Quarterfinals
10 August	10:00	Semifinals
10 August	20:30	Bronze medal match
10 August	21:30	Gold medal match

== Seeds ==
Seeds were based on the ITTF World Ranking lists published in July 2016 with a maximum of 2 players per country. The top 16 seeded players qualified directly to the third round.

1. Ding Ning (CHN) (champion, gold medalist)
2. Feng Tianwei (SIN) (quarterfinals)
3. Li Xiaoxia (CHN) (final, silver medalist)
4. Kasumi Ishikawa (JPN) (third round)
5. Han Ying (GER) (quarterfinals)
6. Ai Fukuhara (JPN) (semifinals, fourth place)
7. Cheng I-ching (TPE) (quarterfinals)
8. Jeon Ji-hee (KOR) (fourth round)
9. Yu Mengyu (SIN) (quarterfinals)
10. Petrissa Solja (GER) (third round)
11. Li Jie (NED) (third round)
12. Seo Hyo-won (KOR) (fourth round)
13. Doo Hoi Kem (HKG) (fourth round)
14. Melek Hu (TUR) (third round)
15. Lee Ho Ching (HKG) (fourth round)
16. Liu Jia (AUT) (fourth round)

The players seeded from 17 to 32 qualified directly to the second round.

17. Yu Fu (POR) (second round)
18. Elizabeta Samara (ROU) (third round)
19. Li Qian (POL) (second round)
20. Li Jiao (NED) (third round)
21. Ri Myong-sun (PRK) (fourth round)
22. Polina Mikhailova (RUS) (second round)
23. Chen Szu-yu (TPE) (fourth round)
24. Georgina Póta (HUN) (third round)
25. Li Fen (SWE) (third round)
26. Tetyana Bilenko (UKR) (third round)
27. Kim Song-i (PRK) (semifinals, bronze medalist)
28. Shen Yanfei (ESP) (second round)
29. Matilda Ekholm (SWE) (third round)
30. Li Xue (FRA) (fourth round)
31. Shao Jieni (POR) (second round)
32. Sofia Polcanova (AUT) (second round)

== Draw ==
=== Finals ===
Semifinals
1	Ding Ning (CHN)	11	9	11	11	11
27	Kim Song-i (PRK)	5	11	6	3	9
3	Li Xiaoxia (CHN)	11	11	11	11
6	Ai Fukuhara (JPN)	4	3	1	1

Gold medal match
1	Ding Ning (CHN) (gold)	11	5	14	9	8	11	11
3	Li Xiaoxia (CHN) (silver)	9	11	12	11	11	7	7
Bronze medal match
27	Kim Song-i (PRK) (bronze)	11	11	11	12	11
6	Ai Fukuhara (JPN)	7	7	5	14	5

=== Top half ===
==== Section 1 ====
Second round
18	Samara (ROU)	11	11	11	12
55	Lin G (BRA)	6	9	3	10
49	Zhang (CAN)	7	12	5	8	5
24	Póta (HUN)	11	10	11	11	11
30	Li X (FRA)	11	11	11	11
44	Díaz (PUR)	1	6	8	8
40	Komwong (THA)	14	8	12	11	7	12	11
17	Yu F (POR)	16	11	10	8	11	10	8

Third round
1	Ding N (CHN)	11	11	11	11
18	Samara (ROU)	5	8	5	2
24	Póta (HUN)	11	11	12	8	9	8
13	Doo H K (HKG)	8	9	14	11	11	11
11	Li Jie (NED)	11	14	8	9	7	11	8
30	Li X (FRA)	8	12	11	11	11	6	11
40	Komwong (THA)	2	4	4	3
5	Han Y (GER)	11	11	11	11

Fourth round
1	Ding N (CHN)	11	11	11	11
13	Doo H K (HKG)	3	5	4	4
30	Li X (FRA)	4	4	11	3	11
5	Han Y (GER)	11	11	8	11	13

Quarterfinals
1	Ding N (CHN)	11	11	11	11
5	Han Y (GER)	8	5	3	7

==== Section 2 ====
Second round
29	Ekholm (SWE)	9	11	11	5	11	12
56	Wu (USA)	11	8	8	11	6	10
53	Lay J F (AUS)	11	11	11	6	10	11
32	Polcanova (AUT)	8	7	4	11	12	7
23	Chen S-y (TPE)	13	9	11	13	11	11
47	Privalova (BLR)	15	11	7	11	5	5
36	Grzybowska (POL)	9	2	6	6
27	Kim S-i (PRK)	11	11	11	11

Third round
8	Jeon J-h (KOR)	11	11	3	11	11
29	Ekholm (SWE)	2	3	11	4	2
53	Lay J F (AUS)	9	9	6	10
9	Yu My (SIN)	11	11	11	12
14	Hu (TUR)	10	6	7	8
23	Chen S-y (TPE)	12	11	11	11
27	Kim S-i (PRK)	7	7	11	11	9	11	11
4	Ishikawa (JPN)	11	11	9	9	11	9	8

Fourth round
8	Jeon J-h (KOR)	10	11	10	7	2
9	Yu My (SIN)	12	8	12	11	11
23	Chen S-y (TPE)	2	6	12	11	9	9
27	Kim S-i (PRK)	11	11	10	8	11	11

Quarterfinals
9	Yu My (SIN)	8	11	5	6	11	6
27	Kim S-i (PRK)	11	6	11	11	9	11

=== Bottom-half ===
==== Section 3 ====
Second round
25	Li F (SWE)	11	6	7	11	9	12	11
39	Balážová (SVK)	8	11	11	8	11	10	7
37	Vacenovská (CZE)	9	8	3	15
26	Bilenko (UKR)	11	11	11	17
31	Shao Jn (POR)	4	9	9	6
48	Zhang (USA)	11	11	11	11
33	Pavlovich (BLR)	9	8	11	13	11	11
22	Mikhailova (RUS)	11	11	9	11	7	8

Third round
3	Li Xx (CHN)	11	11	11	11
25	Li F (SWE)	7	7	8	7
26	Bilenko (UKR)	8	10	11	11	6
15	Lee H C (HKG)	11	12	9	13	11
12	Seo H-w (KOR)	11	11	7	11	11
48	Zhang (USA)	8	8	11	7	6
33	Pavlovich (BLR)	11	9	7	9	11	11	2
7	Cheng I-c (TPE)	7	11	11	11	8	7	11

Fourth round
3	Li Xx (CHN)	11	11	11	11
15	Lee H C (HKG)	5	6	4	4
12	Seo H-w (KOR)	5	9	3	11	11	11	7
7	Cheng I-c (TPE)	11	11	11	4	5	9	11

Quarterfinals
3	Li Xx (CHN)	11	11	11	11
7	Cheng I-c (TPE)	5	5	6	6

==== Section 4 ====
Second round
19	Li Q (POL)	10	9	9	11	8
34	Dodean (ROU)	12	11	11	5	11
45	Lovas (HUN)	9	2	11	4	10
21	Ri M-s (PRK)	11	11	7	11	12
20	Li Jiao (NED)	12	11	9	11	8	11
35	Sawettabut (THA)	10	8	11	7	11	5
38	Ni Xl (LUX)	12	10	12	6	10	11	11
28	Shen Yf (ESP)	10	12	10	11	12	4	7

Third round
6	Fukuhara (JPN)	11	11	11	11
34	Dodean (ROU)	5	6	4	1
21	Ri M-s (PRK)	11	11	11	11
10	Solja (GER)	5	7	6	6
16	Liu J (AUT)	7	11	15	11	11
20	Li Jiao (NED)	11	8	13	9	5
38	Ni Xl (LUX)	11	11	8	5	4	5
2	Feng TW (SIN)	8	5	11	11	11	11

Fourth round
6	Fukuhara (JPN)	11	12	11	11
21	Ri M-s (PRK)	5	10	1	7
16	Liu J (AUT)	6	6	7	11	4
2	Feng TW (SIN)	11	11	11	6	11

Quarterfinals
6	Fukuhara (JPN)	14	11	11	11
2	Feng TW (SIN)	12	8	7	5

== Preliminary rounds ==
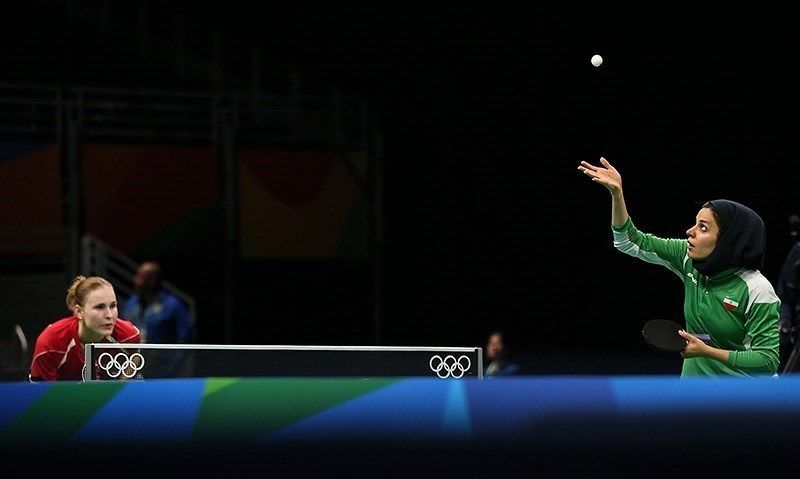
Iran's Neda Shahsavari and Belarus' Aleksandra Privalova

=== Top half ===
==== Section 1 ====
Preliminary round
63	Oshonaike (NGR)	8	11	11	11	8	9	11
68	Sahakian (LIB)	11	9	7	8	11	11	8
50	Meshref (EGY)	12	11	13	11
67	Saidani (TUN)	10	1	11	6

First round
46	Dvorak (ESP)	1	11	6	11	9	6
55	Lin G (BRA)	11	5	11	3	11	11
42	Matelová (CZE)	12	16	8	11	6	11	3
49	Zhang (CAN)	14	14	11	6	11	9	11
44	Díaz (PUR)	11	7	4	11	11	11
63	Oshonaike (NGR)	7	11	11	7	5	2
40	Komwong (THA)	7	13	11	11	11
50	Meshref (EGY)	11	11	7	4	9

==== Section 2 ====
First round
43	Ódorová (SVK)	11	5	9	6	8
56	Wu (USA)	3	11	11	11	11
41	Dolgikh (RUS)	6	7	11	11	10	11	5
53	Lay J F (AUS)	11	11	8	6	12	8	11
47	Privalova (BLR)	11	11	8	8	11	4	11
64	Shahsavari (IRI)	8	8	11	11	8	11	5
36	Grzybowska (POL)	10	11	14	8	11	14
52	Batra (IND)	12	6	12	11	4	12

=== Bottom half ===
==== Section 3 ====
Preliminary round
54	Silva (MEX)	11	11	11	11
69	Allejji (SYR)	2	1	2	4
62	Edem (NGR)	11	11	11	11
70	Yee (FIJ)	3	8	3	2

First round
39	Balážová (SVK)	12	11	11	11
54	Silva (MEX)	10	5	8	7
37	Vacenovská (CZE)	11	11	11	11
60	Ruano (COL)	8	2	7	8
48	Zhang (USA)	11	11	11	11
61	Arvelo (VEN)	3	5	5	7
33	Pavlovich (BLR)	5	11	11	11	11
62	Edem (NGR)	11	8	8	7	4

==== Section 4 ====
Preliminary round
58	Han X (CGO)	11	13	11	11
65	Lariba (PHI)	7	11	9	7
51	Kumahara (BRA)	11	8	11	11	9	11
66	Tapper (AUS)	4	11	5	6	11	8

First round
34	Dodean (ROU)	11	11	11	11
57	Das (IND)	2	7	7	3
45	Lovas (HUN)	11	11	11	11
59	El-Dawlatly (EGY)	6	9	7	7
35	Sawettabut (THA)	11	10	7	8	11	11	11
58	Han X (CGO)	9	12	11	11	6	7	9
38	Ni Xl (LUX)	12	14	8	9	11	11	14
51	Kumahara (BRA)	10	16	11	11	8	3	12
