= 2011 European Table Tennis Championships =

- Date: 8 – 16 Oct
- Location: Gdańsk–Sopot, Poland
- Venue: Ergo Arena
- European Table Tennis Championships

The 2011 European Table Tennis Championships were held in Gdańsk–Sopot, Poland from 8–16 October 2011. Venue for the competition was Ergo Arena.

== Medal summary ==
=== Men's events ===
Event	Gold	Silver	Bronze
Team	Germany; Timo Boll; Dimitrij Ovtcharov; Patrick Baum; Ruwen Filus; Bastian Steger	Sweden; Jörgen Persson; Pär Gerell; Jens Lundqvist; Robert Svensson	Portugal; Tiago Apolónia; João Monteiro; Marcos Freitas Austria; Werner Schlager; Robert Gardos; Daniel Habesohn; Stefan Fegerl
Singles	Timo Boll (GER)	Patrick Baum (GER)	Bojan Tokič (SLO) Aleksandar Karakašević (SRB)
Doubles	Marcos Freitas (POR); Andrej Gaćina (CRO)	Alexander Shibaev (RUS); Kirill Skachkov (RUS)	Alexey Liventsov (RUS); Mikhail Paykov (RUS) Bojan Tokič (SLO); Aleksandar Karakašević (SRB)

=== Women's events ===
Event	Gold	Silver	Bronze
Team	Netherlands; Li Jiao; Li Jie; Elena Timina; Linda Creemers	Romania; Daniela Dodean; Elizabeta Samara; Bernadette Szőcs	Belarus; Veronika Pavlovich; Viktoria Pavlovich; Aleksandra Privalova; Elena Dubkova Hungary; Petra Lovas; Krisztina Tóth; Georgina Póta; Dóra Csilla Madarász; Szandra Pergel
Singles	Li Jiao (NED)	Irene Ivancan (GER)	Margaryta Pesotska (UKR) Li Qian (POL)
Doubles	Rūta Paškauskienė (LIT); Oksana Fadeyeva (RUS)	Daniela Dodean (ROU); Elizabeta Samara (ROU)	Georgina Póta (HUN); Krisztina Tóth (HUN) Li Jie (NED); Elena Timina (NED)
