= Table tennis at the 2015 European Games =

- Venue: Baku Sports Hall
- Dates: 13–19 June
- Competitors: 126 from 34 nations

Table tennis at the 2015 European Games in Baku took place from 13 to 19 June 2015 at Baku Sports Hall. 126 athletes, 63 men and 63 women, competed in four events.

== 2016 Summer Olympics ==
Organisers confirmed that the winners of the men's and women's singles events will qualify automatically for those events at the 2016 Summer Olympics.

== Medalists ==
Event	Gold	Silver	Bronze
Men's singles	Dimitrij Ovtcharov; Germany	Vladimir Samsonov; Belarus	Kou Lei; Ukraine
Men's team	Portugal (POR); João Geraldo; Tiago Apolonia; Marcos Freitas	France (FRA); Adrien Mattenet; Simon Gauzy; Emmanuel Lebesson	Austria (AUT); Robert Gardos; Stefan Fegerl; Daniel Habesohn
Women's singles	Li Jiao; Netherlands	Li Jie; Netherlands	Melek Hu; Turkey
Women's team	Germany (GER); Han Ying; Petrissa Solja; Shan Xiaona	Netherlands (NED); Li Jie; Li Jiao; Britt Eerland	Czech Republic (CZE); Hana Matelová; Renáta Štrbíková; Iveta Vacenovská

== Medal table ==
Rank	Nation	Gold	Silver	Bronze	Total
1	Germany (GER)	2	0	0	2
2	Netherlands (NED)	1	2	0	3
3	Portugal (POR)	1	0	0	1
4	Belarus (BLR)	0	1	0	1
4	France (FRA)	0	1	0	1
6	Austria (AUT)	0	0	1	1
6	Czech Republic (CZE)	0	0	1	1
6	Turkey (TUR)	0	0	1	1
6	Ukraine (UKR)	0	0	1	1
Totals (9 entries)		4	4	4	12

== Participating nations ==
A total of 126 athletes from 34 nations competed in table tennis at the 2015 European Games.

NOC	Men		Women		Total athletes
NOC	Singles	Team	Singles	Team	Total athletes
Austria	2	X	2	X	6
Azerbaijan	2	X	2	X	6
Belarus	2	X	2	X	6
Belgium	2		1		3
Bosnia and Herzegovina	1				1
Bulgaria			1		1
Croatia	2	X	2		5
Cyprus			1		1
Czech Republic	2	X	2	X	6
Denmark	1				1
Finland	1				1
France	2	X	2	X	6
Germany	2	X	2	X	6
Great Britain	2		1		3
Greece	2	X			3
Hungary	2	X	2	X	6
Italy	2				2
Latvia	1				1
Lithuania			1		1
Luxembourg			2	X	3
Netherlands			2	X	3
Poland	2	X	2	X	6
Portugal	2	X	2	X	6
Romania	2	X	2	X	6
Russia	2	X	2	X	6
San Marino			1		1
Serbia	1		2	X	4
Slovakia	2		2		4
Slovenia	1		1		2
Spain	2	X	2		5
Sweden	2	X	2	X	6
Switzerland			1		1
Turkey	1		1		2
Ukraine	2	X	2	X	6
34 NOCs	47	16	47	16	126
