= Table tennis at the East Asian Games =

2009 Sports event

Table tennis is competed in the East Asian Games since the 2009 East Asian Games in Hong Kong.

== Medalists ==
=== Men's singles ===
Year	Host city	Gold	Silver	Bronze
2009	Hong Kong	(China) Xu Xin	(China) Zhang Jike	(Hong Kong) Cheung Yuk
2009	Hong Kong	(China) Xu Xin	(China) Zhang Jike	(Chinese Taipei) Chiang Hung-chieh
2013	Tianjin	(China) Fan Zhendong	(China) Yan An	(South Korea) Jung Young-sik
2013	Tianjin	(China) Fan Zhendong	(China) Yan An	(North Korea) Kim Hyok-bong

=== Women's singles ===
Year	Host city	Gold	Silver	Bronze
2009	Hong Kong	(China) Yao Yan	(China) Wen Jia	(South Korea) Seok Ha-jung
2009	Hong Kong	(China) Yao Yan	(China) Wen Jia	(Hong Kong) Tie Ya Na
2013	Tianjin	(China) Chen Meng	(China) Zhu Yuling	(Japan) Kasumi Ishikawa
2013	Tianjin	(China) Chen Meng	(China) Zhu Yuling	(North Korea) Ri Myong-sun

=== Men's doubles ===
Year	Host city	Gold	Silver	Bronze
2009	Hong Kong	(China) Xu Xin (China) Zhang Jike	(Chinese Taipei) Chiang Peng-lung (Chinese Taipei) Wu Chih-chi	(Hong Kong) Cheung Yuk (Hong Kong) Li Ching
2009	Hong Kong	(China) Xu Xin (China) Zhang Jike	(Chinese Taipei) Chiang Peng-lung (Chinese Taipei) Wu Chih-chi	(Japan) Seiya Kishikawa (Japan) Jun Mizutani
2013	Tianjin	(China) Hao Shuai (China) Yan An	(China) Fan Zhendong (China) Zhou Yu	(South Korea) Cho Eon-rae (South Korea) Lee Sang-su
2013	Tianjin	(China) Hao Shuai (China) Yan An	(China) Fan Zhendong (China) Zhou Yu	(Japan) Kenta Matsudaira (Japan) Koki Niwa

=== Women's doubles ===
Year	Host city	Gold	Silver	Bronze
2009	Hong Kong	(Japan) Ai Fukuhara (Japan) Kasumi Ishikawa	(Japan) Hiroko Fujii (Japan) Misako Wakamiya	(Hong Kong) Lin Ling (Hong Kong) Zhang Rui
2009	Hong Kong	(Japan) Ai Fukuhara (Japan) Kasumi Ishikawa	(Japan) Hiroko Fujii (Japan) Misako Wakamiya	(South Korea) Moon Hyun-jung (South Korea) Seok Ha-jung
2013	Tianjin	(China) Chen Meng (China) Zhu Yuling	(South Korea) Park Young-sook (South Korea) Yang Ha-eun	(Chinese Taipei) Cheng I-ching (Chinese Taipei) Huang Yi-hua
2013	Tianjin	(China) Chen Meng (China) Zhu Yuling	(South Korea) Park Young-sook (South Korea) Yang Ha-eun	(North Korea) Kim Hye-song (North Korea) Kim Jong

=== Mixed doubles ===
Year	Host city	Gold	Silver	Bronze
2009	Hong Kong	(Hong Kong) Ko Lai Chak (Hong Kong) Tie Ya Na	(Hong Kong) Tang Peng (Hong Kong) Jiang Huajun	(Japan) Seiya Kishikawa (Japan) Kasumi Ishikawa
2009	Hong Kong	(Hong Kong) Ko Lai Chak (Hong Kong) Tie Ya Na	(Hong Kong) Tang Peng (Hong Kong) Jiang Huajun	(Chinese Taipei) Wu Chih-chi (Chinese Taipei) Huang Yi-hua
2013	Tianjin	(North Korea) Kim Hyok-bong (North Korea) Kim Jong	(South Korea) Seo Hyun-deok (South Korea) Yang Ha-eun	(North Korea) Kim Nam-chol (North Korea) Kim Hye-song
2013	Tianjin	(North Korea) Kim Hyok-bong (North Korea) Kim Jong	(South Korea) Seo Hyun-deok (South Korea) Yang Ha-eun	(China) Zhou Yu (China) Zhao Yan

=== Men's team ===
Year	Host city	Gold	Silver	Bronze
2009	Hong Kong	China	Japan	Hong Kong
2009	Hong Kong	China	Japan	South Korea
2013	Tianjin	China	South Korea	Hong Kong
2013	Tianjin	China	South Korea	Japan

=== Women's team ===
Year	Host city	Gold	Silver	Bronze
2009	Hong Kong	Hong Kong	China	Chinese Taipei
2009	Hong Kong	Hong Kong	China	Japan
2013	Tianjin	China	Japan	Hong Kong
2013	Tianjin	China	Japan	South Korea

== See also ==
- East Asian Games
- Table tennis at the Asian Games
