= Mikie Tasei =

Japanese table tennis player

Personal information
- Nationality: Japanese
- Born: 17 January 1980 (age 46)

Sport
- Sport: Table tennis

Mikie Tasei (born 17 January 1980) is a Japanese table tennis player. Her highest career ITTF ranking was 36.
