= Dang Ye-seo =

South Korean table tennis player

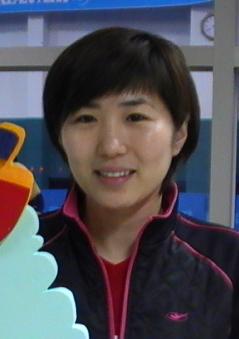
- Dang Ye-seo, in 2009

Personal information
- Nationality: South Korea
- Born: 27 April 1981 (age 45) Changchun, Jilin, China
- Height: 1.58 m (5 ft 2 in)
- Weight: 54 kg (119 lb; 8.5 st)

Sport
- Sport: Table tennis
- Playing style: Right-handed, shakehand grip
- Highest ranking: 16 (July 2009)
Medal record
Women's table tennis
Representing South Korea
Olympic Games
Bronze medal – third place	2008 Beijing	Team
World Championships
Bronze medal – third place	2012 Dortmund	Team
Asian Championships
Bronze medal – third place	2009 Lucknow	Doubles
Bronze medal – third place	2009 Lucknow	Team
Bronze medal – third place	2011 Macau	Team

- Dang Ye-seo
- Hangul: 당예서
- Hanja: 唐汭序
- RR: Dang Yeseo
- MR: Tang Yesŏ

Dang Ye-seo (Korean: 당예서; Hanja: 唐汭序; Korean pronunciation: [taŋ.je̞.sʌ]; born April 27, 1981, in Changchun, Jilin, China and originally known as Tang Na 唐娜) is a naturalized South Korean table tennis player. She was part of the table tennis team that won a bronze medal at the 2008 Summer Olympics, and part of the team that won a bronze medal at the 2012 World Team Championships.
