= Anna Tikhomirova =

Russian table tennis player

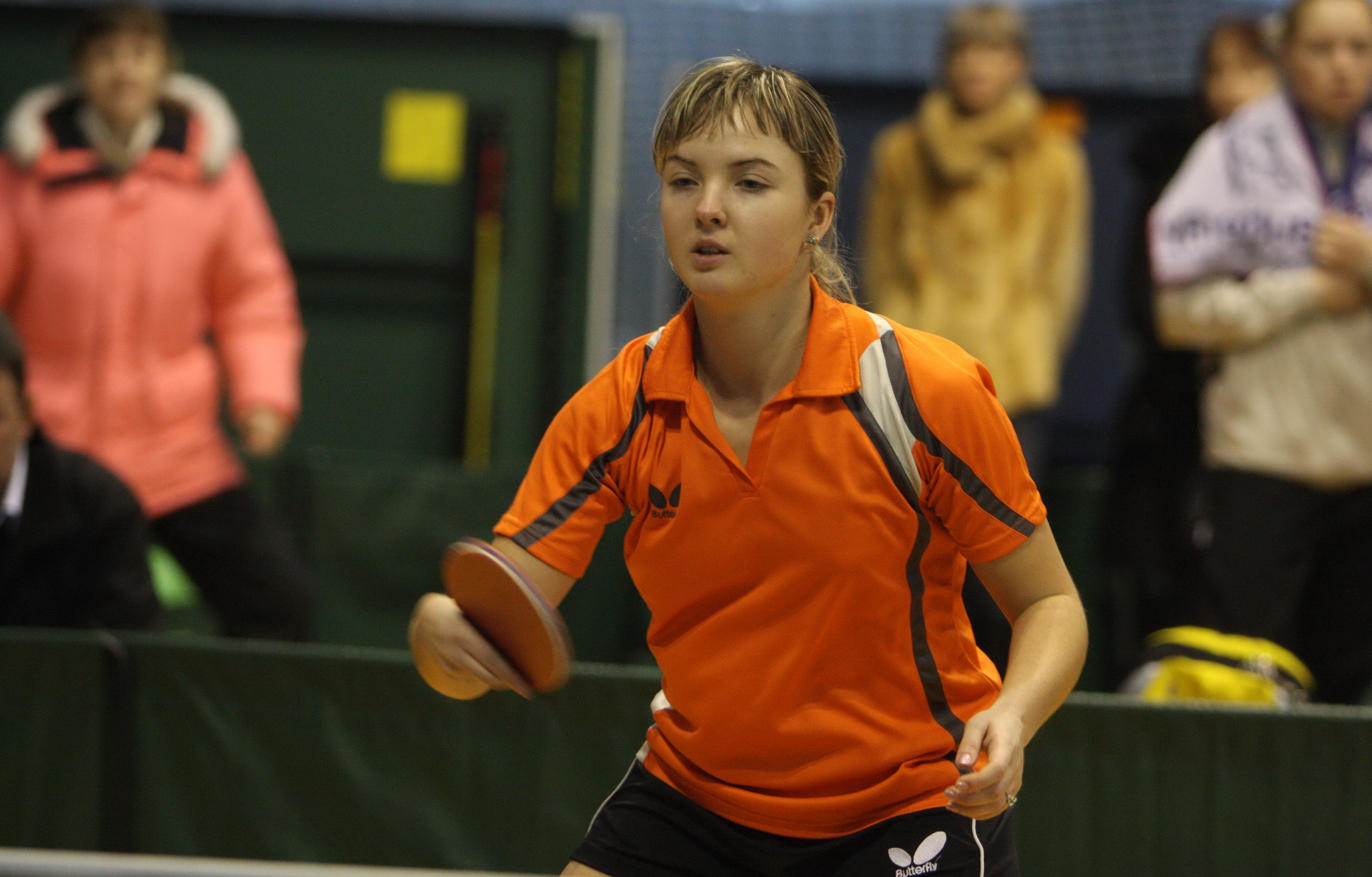

Personal information
- Full name: Anna Tikhomirova
- Nationality: Soviet Union Russia
- Born: 04.12.1984 Samara
- Height: 1.62 m (5 ft 4 in)
- Weight: 60 kg (130 lb)

Sport
- Sport: Table tennis
Medal record
Women's table tennis
Representing Russia
European Championships
Bronze medal – third place	2013 Schwechat	Team
Bronze medal – third place	2015 Yekaterinburg	Team

Anna Tikhomirova (born 4 December 1984) is a Russian table tennis player. She competed for Russia at the 2012 Summer Olympics.
