= Margaryta Pesotska =

Ukrainian table tennis player

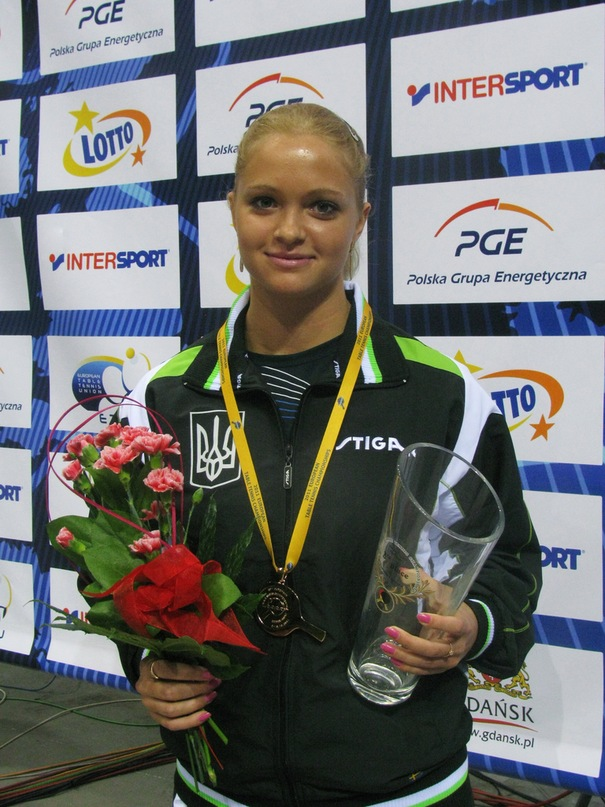
- Margaryta Pesotska at the 2011 European Championships

Personal information
- Full name: Margaryta Volodymyrivna Pesotska
- Nationality: Ukraine
- Born: 9 August 1991 (age 35) Kyiv, Ukrainian SSR, Soviet Union
- Height: 175 cm (5 ft 9 in)
- Weight: 68 kg (150 lb)

Sport
- Sport: Table tennis
- Highest ranking: 27 (1 February 2022)
- Current ranking: 45 (28 September 2026)
Medal record
Women's table tennis
Representing Ukraine
European Championships
Silver medal – second place	2009 Stuttgart	Singles
Silver medal – second place	2018 Alicante	Singles
Bronze medal – third place	2011 Gdańsk–Sopot	Singles
Bronze medal – third place	2015 Yekaterinburg	Team
Bronze medal – third place	2020 Warsaw	Singles

Margaryta Volodymyrivna Pesotska (Ukrainian: Маргарита Володимирівна Песоцька; born 9 August 1991 in Kyiv, Ukraine) is a Ukrainian table tennis player.

== Career ==
Pesotska competed at the 2008 Summer Olympics, reaching the first round of the singles competition. She won the silver medal in singles event at the Table Tennis European Championships in 2009. Two years later she repeated her success by winning bronze at the 2011 European Championships. Next European-level success in the singles event came in 2018 when she reached finals at the European championships.

At the 2012 Summer Olympics, she reached the third round of the singles competition. Pesotska was also expected to participate at the 2016 Summer Olympics and was even granted an invitation but she withdrew from the Games due to injury.

Pesotska competed at the 2015 European Games where she lost in the quarterfinals in singles event and finished 4th in team event where Ukraine lost in bronze medal match to the Czech Republic. Pesotska is also 2015 European championships bronze medalist in women's team competition.

In March 2021, Pesotska played in WTT Doha. In the WTT Contender event, she upset eighth seed Adriana Diaz in the round of 32 but lost to Xiaona Shan in the round of 16. However, she was in turn upset by breakout star Shin Yubin in the round of 32 of the WTT Star Contender Event. In June, at the delayed 2020 European Championships, Pesotska won a bronze medal in the women's singles. At the Tokyo 2020 Olympics she was defeated by India's Manika Batra in the second round.

== Personal life ==
She graduated from National Pedagogical Dragomanov University.

On 27 June 2015, she married her boyfriend Andrii Bratko.
