= Seok Ha-jung =

Chinese-South Korean table tennis player

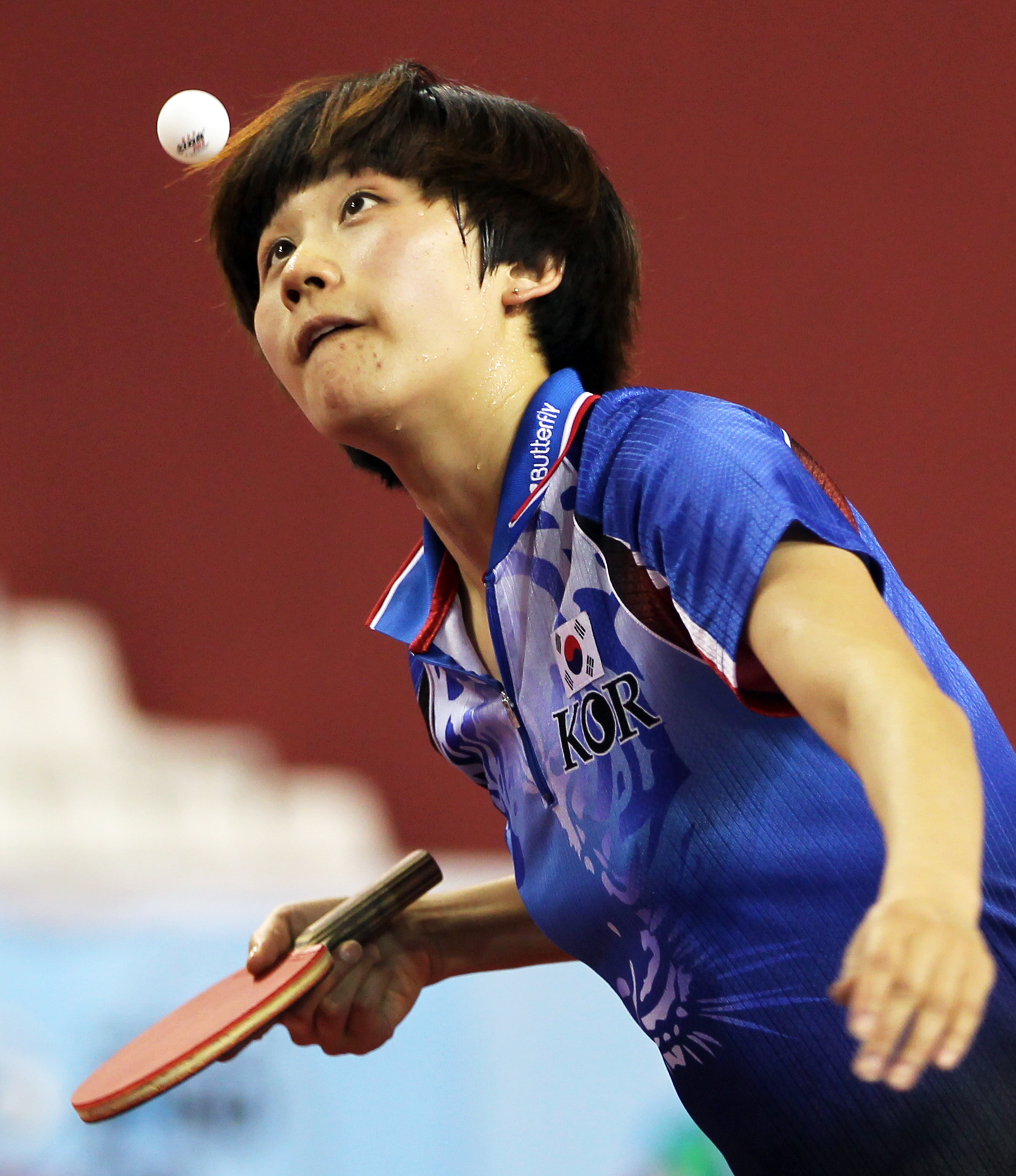
- Ha-jung in the women's final of the 2012 Qatar Open

Personal information
- Born: January 11, 1985 (age 41) China
- Height: 172 cm (5 ft 8 in)
- Weight: 59 kg (130 lb)

Sport
- Sport: Table tennis
- Club: Korean Air
Medal record
Representing South Korea
World Championships
Bronze medal – third place	2012 Dortmund	Women's team
Asian Games
Bronze medal – third place	2010 Guangzhou	Women's team
East Asian Games
Bronze medal – third place	2009 Hong Kong	Women's singles
Bronze medal – third place	2009 Hong Kong	Women's doubles

Seok Ha-jung (also Seok Ha-jeong 석 하정, born January 11, 1985, as Shi Lei) is a Chinese-South Korean table tennis player. She won four bronze medals at major international competitions: two at the 2009 East Asian Games and one each at the 2010 Asian Games and 2012 World Championships. Her team placed fourth at the 2012 Summer Olympics. Her world ranking varied from 12 to 65 between 2008 and 2014, peaking in early 2011.
