= Zhu Fang =

Spanish table tennis player

Medal record

Women's Table tennis

Representing Spain
Bronze medal – third place	Pescara 2009	Team

Zhu Fang (born 2 October 1976) is a female Chinese-born table tennis player who now represents Spain.

She competed at the 2008 Summer Olympics, reaching the second round of the singles competition. She also competed in the team competition.

She was born in Beijing.
