= Li Qian (Polish table tennis player) =

Chinese-Polish table tennis player

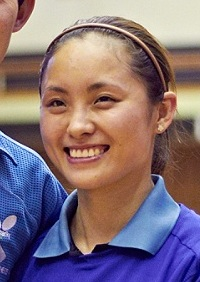

Personal information
- Nationality: Poland
- Born: 30 July 1986 (age 39) Baoding, China

Sport
- Sport: Table tennis
Medal record
Women's table tennis
Representing Poland
World Championships
Bronze medal – third place	2015 Suzhou	Doubles
European Games
Bronze medal – third place	2019 Minsk	Team
European Championships
Gold medal – first place	2018 Alicante	Singles
Silver medal – second place	2009 Stuttgart	Team
Bronze medal – third place	2010 Ostrava	Team
Bronze medal – third place	2011 Gdańsk-Sopot	Singles
Bronze medal – third place	2015 Yekaterinburg	Doubles

Li Qian (born 30 July 1986 in Baoding) is a Chinese-Polish female table tennis player, who currently lived in Tarnobrzeg and represents the team of Siarka Tarnobrzeg.

== Career ==
Li Qian became a naturalised citizen of Poland in November 2007. In early 2008, Li Qian became the first ever female Polish table tennis player to take part in the prestigious TOP-12 in Frankfurt am Main. She reached the final, losing to Li Jiao from the Netherlands. She competed for Poland at the Beijing 2008, London 2012, Rio 2016 and Tokyo 2020 Summer Olympics.

In May 2008, she was 26th in the world rank of the International Table Tennis Federation, and fifth in the European rank of the ITTF.

In February 2009, she won the TOP-12 in Düsseldorf, defeating Li Jie in the final match. Li Qian was ranked 3rd in Europe and 22nd on the world ranking list.
