= Tie Ya Na =

Hong Kong table tennis player

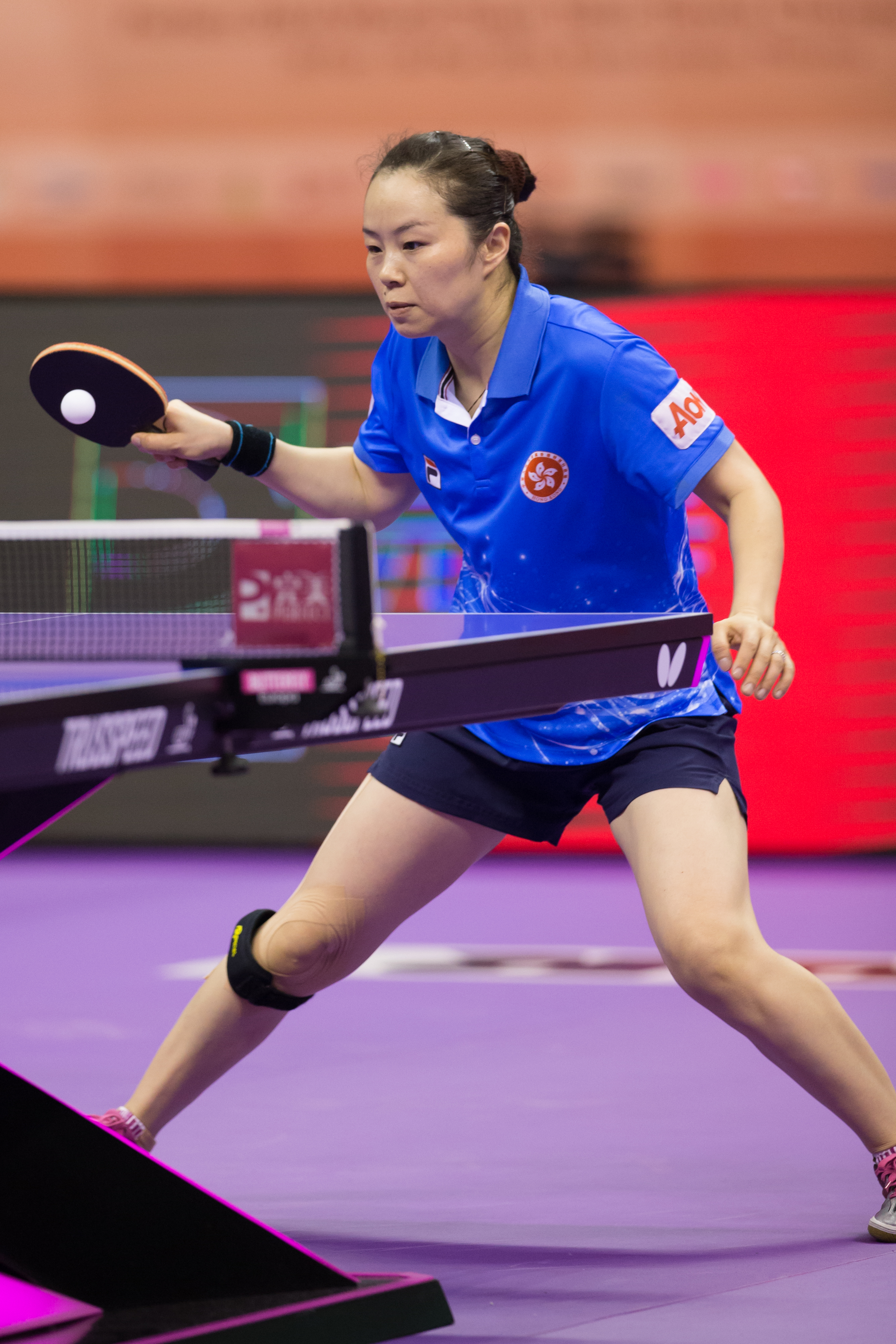
- Tie in 2016

Personal information
- Nationality: China→ Hong Kong
- Born: 13 May 1979 (age 47) Zhengzhou, Henan, China
- Height: 1.61 m (5 ft 3 in)
- Weight: 51.3 kg (113 lb; 8.08 st)

Sport
- Sport: Table tennis
- Playing style: Right-handed, shakehand grip
- Highest ranking: 3 (July 2006)
- Current ranking: 16 (December 2016)
Medal record
Women's table tennis
Representing Hong Kong
World Championships
Silver medal – second place	2004 Doha	Team
Silver medal – second place	2006 Bremen	Team
Bronze medal – third place	2005 Shanghai	Doubles
Bronze medal – third place	2007 Zagreb	Mixed Doubles
Bronze medal – third place	2008 Guangzhou	Team
Bronze medal – third place	2009 Yokohama	Doubles
Bronze medal – third place	2011 Rotterdam	Doubles
Bronze medal – third place	2012 Dortmund	Team
Bronze medal – third place	2014 Tokyo	Team
World Cup
Silver medal – second place	2008 Kuala Lumpur	Singles
Bronze medal – third place	2002 Singapore	Singles
Bronze medal – third place	2004 Hangzhou	Singles
Bronze medal – third place	2011 Singapore	Singles
Asian Games
Gold medal – first place	2002 Busan	Mixed doubles

Tie Ya Na or Tie Yana (Chinese: 帖雅娜; pinyin: Tiē Yǎnà; Sidney Lau: tip^{3} nga^{5} noh^{5}; born 13 May 1979) is a table tennis player from Hong Kong, China who won two silver medals at the 2006 Asian Games in the singles and doubles competitions.

Tie played for China in the Universiade before emigrating to Hong Kong in 2002.

She is married to Tang Peng, another table tennis player representing Hong Kong.

== Career records ==
Singles (as of 9 November 2014)

- Olympics: QF (2004, 08).
- World Championships: round of 16 (2003, 05, 11).
- World Cup appearances: 11. Record: runner-up (2008); 3rd (2002, 04, 11).
- Pro Tour winner (8): Korea Open 2002; Brazil Open 2003; Russian Open 2004; Croatian Open 2004; Korea, Chinese Taipei Open 2006; Brazil Open 2007; Hungarian Open 2010. Runner-up (2): USA, Swedish Open 2005.
- Pro Tour Grand Finals appearances: 9. Record: SF (2005).
- Asian Games: runner-up (2006).
- Asian Championships: SF (2003).
- Asian Cup: 1st (2004); 3rd (2003, 05).

Women's doubles

- Olympics: QF (2004).
- World Championships: SF (2005, 09, 11)
- Pro Tour winner (14): Russian, Slovenian, Croatian, Chile, USA, German, Swedish Open 2005; Korea, Japan Open 2006; Brazil, Chile Open 2007; Chile, China (Shanghai) Open 2008, Spain 2011. Runner-up (8): Italian Open 2002; Danish Open 2003; Qatar, Singapore Open 2006; Qatar, Austrian Open 2007; Kuwait, Korea Open 2009.
- Pro Tour Grand Finals appearances: 9. Record: runner-up (2009, 2010); SF (2004, 07, 08).
- Asian Games: runner-up (2006)
- Asian Championships: SF (2003, 05, 07)

Mixed doubles

- World Championships: SF (2007)
- Asian Games: winner (2002)
- Asian Championships: runner-up (2007); SF (2003)

Team

- Olympics: 5th (2008, 2012)
- World Championships: 2nd (2004, 06); 3rd (2008, 2012)
- World Team Cup: 3rd (2007, 09, 2013)
- Asian Championships: 1st (2005); 2nd (2003)
