= Veronika Pavlovich =

Belarusian table tennis player

Personal information
- Full name: Veronika Vladimirovna Pavlovich
- Nationality: Belarus
- Born: May 8, 1978 (age 48) Minsk, Belarus
- Height: 1.76 m (5 ft 9 in)

Sport
- Sport: Table tennis
Medal record
Women's table tennis
Representing Belarus
World Championships
Bronze medal – third place	2006 Bremen	Team
European Championships
Bronze medal – third place	2008 St Petersburg	Doubles

Veronika Pavlovich (Belarusian: Вераніка Паўлавіч; born 8 May 1978) is a Belarusian table tennis player.

She competed at the 2008 Summer Olympics, reaching the third round of the singles competition. She competed in doubles in 2004.

Pavlovich was born in Minsk, and resides there. Her twin sister Viktoria Pavlovich is also an Olympic table tennis player.
