= Petra Lovas =

Hungarian table tennis player

Personal information
- Nationality: Hungary
- Born: June 4, 1980 (age 46) Budapest, Hungary
- Height: 158 cm (5 ft 2 in)
- Weight: 49 kg (108 lb)

Sport
- Sport: Table tennis
Medal record
Women's table tennis
Representing Hungary
European Championships
Gold medal – first place	2007 Belgrade	Team
Silver medal – second place	2008 Saint Petersburg	Team
Bronze medal – third place	2002 Zagreb	Team
Bronze medal – third place	2011 Gdańsk–Sopot	Team

Petra Lovas (born 4 July 1980) is a Hungarian table tennis player.

She competed at the 2008 Summer Olympics, reaching the first round of the singles competition.
