= Iveta Vacenovská =

Czech table tennis player

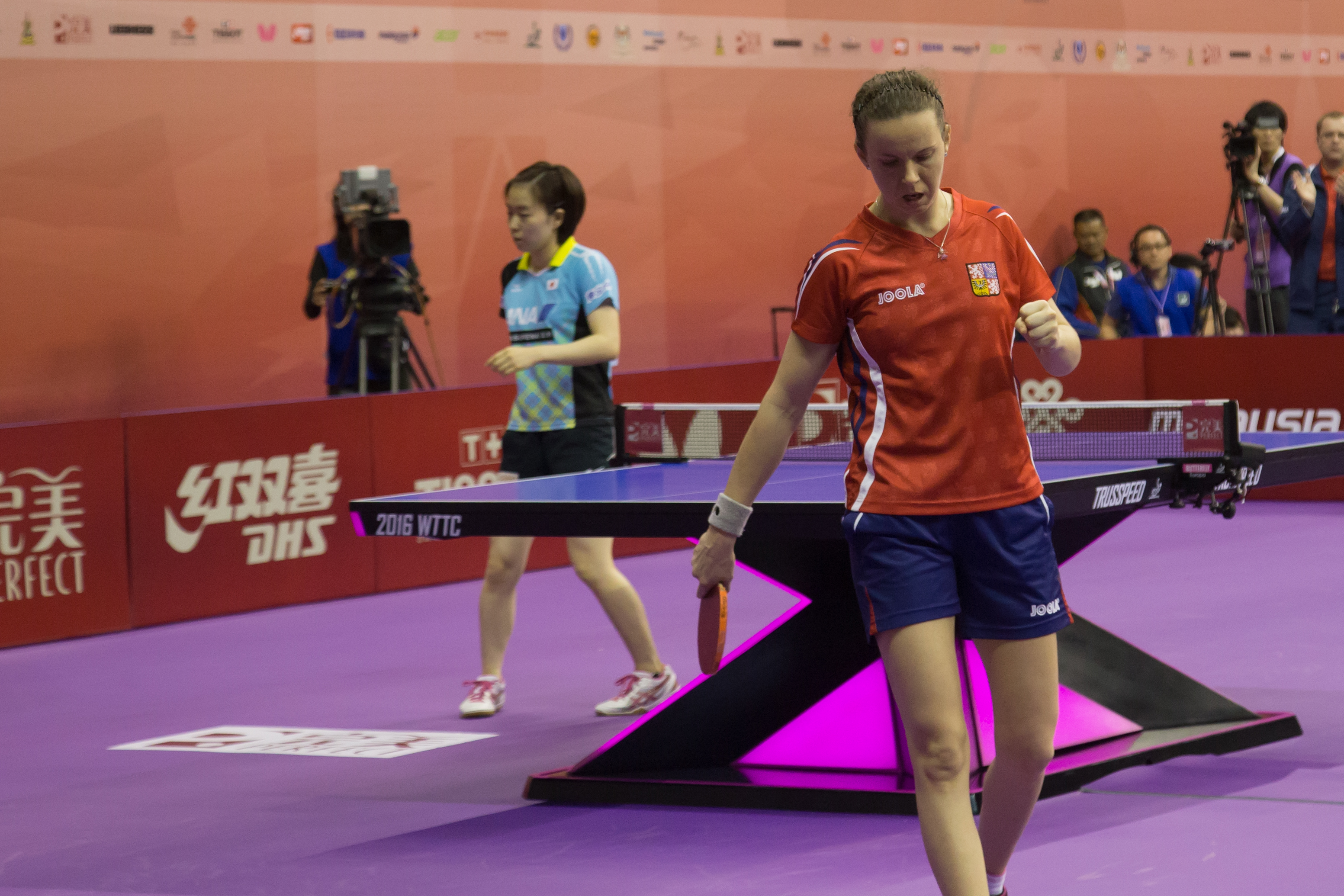
- Vacenovská in 2016

Personal information
- Full name: Iveta Vacenovská
- Nationality: Czech Republic
- Born: 22 March 1986 (age 40) Hodonín, Czechoslovakia

Sport
- Sport: Table tennis
- Club: Linz AG Froschberg
- Playing style: Shakehand
- Equipment: Butterfly
- Highest ranking: 29 (December 2012)

Iveta Vacenovská (Czech pronunciation: [ˈɪvɛta ˈvatsɛnofskaː]; born 22 March 1986) is a Czech table tennis player. She resides in Linz, Austria and plays for Linz AG Froschberg.

Based on her world ranking in May 2011, she qualified directly for the London 2012 Olympic Games, where she reached the third round before losing to Wu Jiaduo of Germany.

== Life ==
Vacenovská began playing table tennis when she was six years old, because of her uncle, who is a table tennis coach. Besides being a professional athlete, she is also a student at the Charles University in Prague in the Department of Sport and Physical Education, and enjoys all kinds of sporting activities.

== Career records ==
- 2003 European Youth Champion Singles
- 2006 U21 Winner ITTF Pro Tour Grand Finals
- 2009 3rd place Team European Championships
- 2009 Champions League Winner with Linz AG Froschberg
- 2005, 2007, 2011 Winner Stadtmeisterschaften Singles
- 2015 bronze medal in the 2015 European Games in table tennis.
