= Viktoria Pavlovich =

Belarusian table tennis player

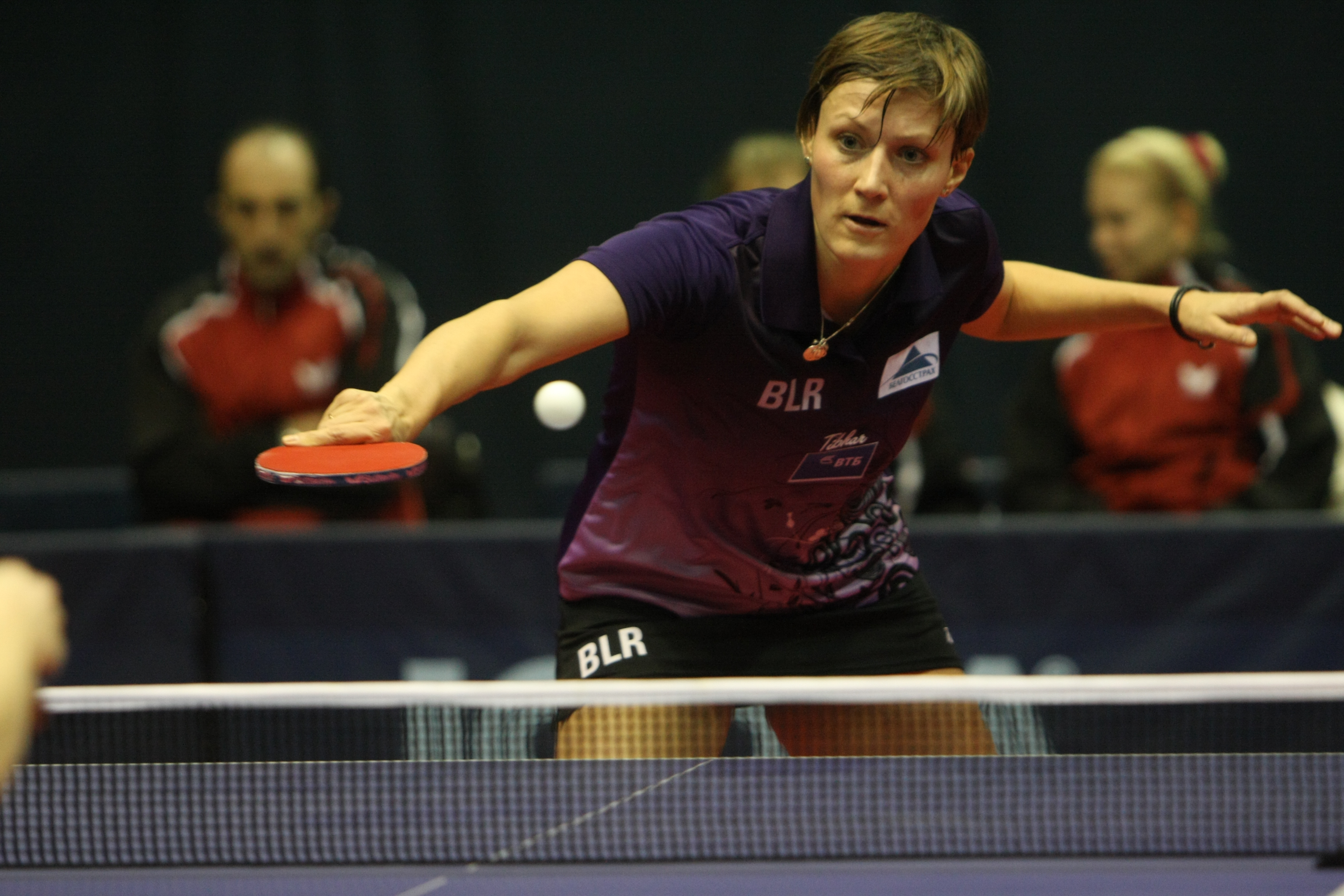

Personal information
- Full name: Viktoriya Vladimirovna Pavlovich
- Nationality: Belarus
- Born: 8 May 1978 (age 48) Minsk, Belarus
- Height: 1.76 m (5 ft 9 in)

Sport
- Sport: Table tennis
Medal record
Women's table tennis
Representing Belarus
World Championships
| Bronze medal – third place | 2006 Bremen | Team |
European Championships
| Gold medal – first place | 2007 Belgrade | Doubles |
| Gold medal – first place | 2010 Ostrava | Singles |
| Gold medal – first place | 2012 Herning | Singles |
| Silver medal – second place | 2002 Zagreb | Doubles |
| Silver medal – second place | 2003 Courmayeur | Mixed doubles |
| Silver medal – second place | 2005 Aarhus | Mixed doubles |
| Silver medal – second place | 2009 Subotica | Mixed doubles |
| Bronze medal – third place | 2002 Zagreb | Mixed doubles |
| Bronze medal – third place | 2007 Belgrade | Singles |
| Bronze medal – third place | 2009 Stuttgart | Singles |
| Bronze medal – third place | 2010 Subotica | Mixed doubles |
| Bronze medal – third place | 2011 Gdańsk–Sopot | Team |

Viktoria Pavlovich (Belarusian: Вікторыя Уладзіміраўна Паўловіч; Łacinka: Viktoryja Uładzimiraŭna Paŭłovič; born 8 May 1978) is a Belarusian table tennis player who plays for Turkish powerhouse Fenerbahçe SK. She won the women's singles at the 2010 and 2012 European Championships. She was born in Minsk, and resides there. Her twin sister Veronika Pavlovich is an Olympic table tennis player as well.

She competed at the 2008 Summer Olympics, reaching the third round of the singles competition. She competed in both singles and doubles in 2004. At the 2012 Summer Olympics she reached the fourth round.
