= Li Jie (table tennis) =

Chinese-born Dutch table tennis player

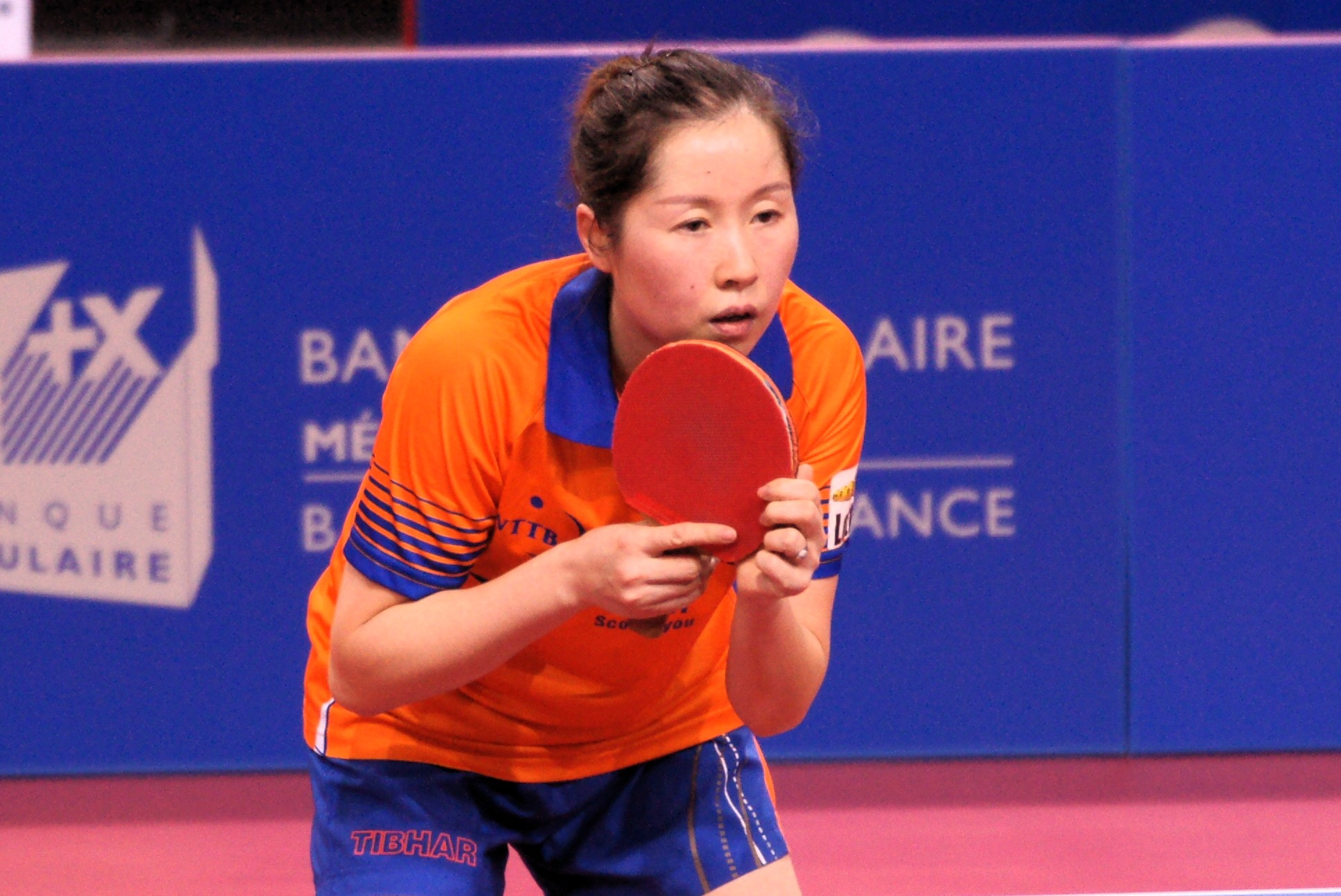
- Lie Jie, Europe Top-16 Antibes 2017

Personal information
- Nationality: Netherlands
- Born: 6 March 1984 (age 42) Chengdu, Sichuan, China
- Height: 1.65 m (5 ft 5 in)
- Weight: 52 kg (115 lb; 8.2 st)

Sport
- Sport: Table tennis
- Highest ranking: 17 (August 2015)
- Current ranking: 93 (28 September 2026)
Medal record
Women's table tennis
Representing the Netherlands
World Championships
Bronze medal – third place	2015 Suzhou	Doubles
European Games
Silver medal – second place	2015 Baku	Singles
Silver medal – second place	2015 Baku	Team
European Championships
Gold medal – first place	2008 Saint Petersburg	Team
Gold medal – first place	2009 Stuttgart	Team
Gold medal – first place	2010 Ostrava	Team
Gold medal – first place	2011 Gdańsk-Sopot	Team
Silver medal – second place	2010 Ostrava	Doubles
Silver medal – second place	2015 Yekaterinburg	Singles
Bronze medal – third place	2011 Gdańsk-Sopot	Doubles
Bronze medal – third place	2015 Yekaterinburg	Doubles
Bronze medal – third place	2016 Budapest	Singles
Bronze medal – third place	2025 Zadar	Team
Europe Top-16
Gold medal – first place	2017 Antibes	Singles
Silver medal – second place	2009 Düsseldorf	Singles
Silver medal – second place	2012 Lyon	Singles
Silver medal – second place	2018 Montreux	Singles
Bronze medal – third place	2010 Düsseldorf	Singles
Bronze medal – third place	2011 Liège	Singles

Li Jie (born 6 March 1984 in Chengdu, Sichuan) is a Chinese-born Dutch women's table tennis player who now represents the Netherlands.

She was born in Chengdu, and resides in Den Helder. She currently plays for Spanish team Club Cartagena.

== Career highlights ==
Olympic Games
2008, Beijing, team competition, 9th
2012, London, team competition, 5th
2008, Beijing and 2012, London, women's singles, round of sixteen
World Championships
2015, Suzhou, women's doubles, semi-final
2008, Guangzhou, team competition, 7th
2014, Tokyo, team competition, 5th
2011, Rotterdam and 2015, Suzhou, women's singles, round of sixteen
European Championships
2008, St. Petersburg, team competition, winner (gold)
2009, Stuttgart, team competition, winner (gold)
2011, Gdansk-Sopot, team competition, winner (gold)
European Games
2015, Baku, women's singles, runner-up (silver)
2015, Baku, team competition, runner-up (silver)
Pro Tour Meetings
2007, Velenje, women's doubles, semi final
2007, Stockholm, women's doubles, quarter final
2008, Velenje, women's doubles, winner (gold)
2008, Santiago, women's singles, quarter final
2008, Santiago, women's doubles, semi final
2008, Yokohama, team competition, 5th
2008, Daejeon, women's doubles, semi final
2008, Shanghai, women's doubles, semi final
2008, Salzburg, women's singles, semi final
2010, Velenje, women's doubles, runner-up
2010, New Delhi, women's doubles, runner-up
2014, Almeria, women's doubles, semi final
