= Orenji =

Orenji (オレンジ) is the Japanese word for the color orange.

It may also refer to:

- Orange (2015 film), a Japanese film
- "Orenji", a song by Bonnie Pink on the 1995 album Blue Jam
- "Orenji", a song by Yui Aragaki on the 2007 album Sora
- "Orenji", a live version of "Make My Day" (Yui Aragaki song)
