= Akai Ito (song) =

Single by Yui Aragaki

from the album Hug
- Released: October 15, 2008
- Recorded: 2008
- Genre: Pop
- Length: 25:15
- Label: Warner Music Japan
- Songwriters: Kentarō Kobuchi, Blow
- Producer: Seiji Kameda

Yui Aragaki singles chronology
"Make My Day" (2008)	"Akai Ito" (2008)	"Piece" (2009)

Audio sample
- file; help

"Akai Ito" (赤い糸 "Red Thread") is a pop song by Japanese recording artist Yui Aragaki. It was released as her second single on October 15, 2008.

== Background ==
"Akai Ito" is a cover of one of Kobukuro's lesser known songs from their independent releases. Kobukuro's team wanted to bring focus to the song once again and suggested to the band they have a female vocalist cover it. Upon hearing Kobukuro perform the song at a Warner Music Japan Convention concert, Aragaki fell in love with the song and agreed to cover it. Aragaki's version was subsequently produced by Tokyo Jihen member Seiji Kameda.

The single was released in two formats: a limited edition, which has an illustration cover drawn by Aragaki herself and a standard edition, which comes with a bonus DVD that includes the music video for "Akai Ito" as well as its making of.

== Chart performance ==
"Akai Ito" peaked at #1 on the daily Oricon singles chart and #3 on the weekly chart, selling 34,236 copies in its first week. The song debuted at #1 on the Billboard Japan Hot 100, making it her second consecutive number-one debut on this chart "Akai Ito" was the 15th best selling single for the month of October and ranked #120 on the yearly Oricon singles chart.

== Track listing ==
CD
No.	Title	Lyrics	Music	Length
1.	"Akai Ito" (赤い糸 "Red Thread")	Kentarō Kobuchi	Blow	6:24
2.	"Tsunaida Te" (つないだ手 "Held Hands")	Yui Aragaki	Kenji Kubo	4:52
3.	"Aitai" (あいたい "I Miss You")	Yūho Iwasato	Tadashi Hirosawa	4:29
4.	"Akai Ito (Naked Voice Version)"	Kobuchi	Kobuchi	3:08
5.	"Akai Ito (Instrumental)"		Kobuchi	6:22
Total length:				25:15

DVD
No.	Title	Length
1.	"Akai Ito" (Music video)
2.	"Akai Ito" (Making)

== Charts and sales ==
Chart (2008)	Peak positions	Sales
Japan Hot 100 (Billboard)	1	64,461
Japan Oricon Daily Singles Chart	1	64,461
Japan Oricon Weekly Singles Chart	3	64,461
Japan Oricon Monthly Singles Chart	15	64,461
Japan Oricon Yearly Singles Chart	120	64,461
Japan SoundScan Singles Chart (CD+DVD)	5	64,461
Japan SoundScan Singles Chart (CD)	6	64,461

== Release history ==
Region	Date	Label	Format
Japan	October 15, 2008	Warner Music Japan	CD (Limited Edition)
Japan	October 15, 2008	Warner Music Japan	CD+DVD (Standard Edition)
