= Niji (album) =

Studio album by Yui Aragaki
- Released: September 22, 2010
- Recorded: 2009–2010
- Genre: Pop
- Length: 51:14
- Label: Warner Music Japan

Yui Aragaki chronology
Hug (2009)	Niji (2010)

Niji (虹 "Rainbow") is the third studio album by Japanese recording artist Yui Aragaki. It was released on September 22, 2010.

== Background ==
The album includes Aragaki's previously digitally released "Walk" and "Chiisana Koi no Uta" (a Mongol800 cover) as well "Hanamizuki", a Yō Hitoto cover and theme song to Aragaki's film Hanamizuki. It was released in three formats: CD-only standard edition, limited edition A, which has an illustration cover drawn by Aragaki and comes priced at 2,000 yen, and limited edition B, which comes with a bonus DVD that includes the music videos for "Chiisana Koi no Uta", "Walk" and "Hanamizuki".

== Chart performance ==
Niji debuted on the daily Oricon albums chart at #2 with 5,955 copies sold. It peaked at #4 on the weekly charts with 19,888 copies sold, making it Aragaki's third consecutive album to debut in the top 5.

== Track listing ==
CD
No.	Title	Lyrics	Music	Length
1.	"No Problem!"	Motoki Matsuoka	Matsuoka	3:01
2.	"Fuwari" (ふわり "Airy")	Yui Aragaki	Cube Juice	4:18
3.	"Chiisana Koi no Uta" (小さな恋のうた "Small Love Song")	Kiyosaku Uezu	Mongol800	5:24
4.	"Collage"	Tomoko Kawase	Shunsaku Okuda	4:44
5.	"Hanamizuki" (ハナミズキ "Flowering Dogwood")	Yō Hitoto	Tatsurō Mashiko	5:27
6.	"Tekuteku" (てくてく "Trudgingly")	Kenko-P	Natsumi	4:00
7.	"Tobira" (扉 "Door")	Anri Kumaki	Kumaki	4:46
8.	"Purezento" (プレゼント "Present")	Kenji Kubo	Kubo	5:08
9.	"Days"	Yuriko Mori	Kazuaki Yamashita	3:55
10.	"Walk"	Yumi Moriguchi	Moriguchi	5:13
11.	"Niji" (虹 "Rainbow")	Matsuoka, Aragaki	Matsuoka, Aragaki	5:18
Total length:				51:14

DVD
No.	Title	Length
1.	"Chiisana Koi no Uta" (Music Video)
2.	"Walk" (Music Video)
3.	"Hanamizuki" (Music Video)
4.	"Yui Making"

== Charts and sales ==
Chart (2010)	Peak position	Sales
Japan Oricon Daily Albums Chart	2	25,732
Japan Oricon Weekly Albums Chart	4	25,732

== Release history ==
Region	Date	Label	Format
Japan	September 22, 2010	Warner Music Japan	CD (Limited Edition A)
Japan	September 22, 2010	Warner Music Japan	CD+DVD (Limited Edition B)
Japan	September 22, 2010	Warner Music Japan	CD (Standard Edition)
