= Hug (album) =

Studio album by Yui Aragaki
- Released: June 17, 2009
- Recorded: 2008–2009
- Genre: Pop
- Length: 59:29 (Disc 1); 36:03 (Disc 2)
- Label: Warner Music Japan
- Producer: Seiji Kameda

Yui Aragaki chronology
Sora (2007)	Hug (2009)	Niji (2010)

Alternative covers
- Limited edition A cover

Alternative cover
- Limited edition B cover

Singles from Hug
- 1. "Make My Day" Released: July 16, 2008; 2. "Akai Ito" Released: October 15, 2008; 3. "Piece" Released: February 25, 2009; 4. "Utsushie" Released: May 27, 2009

Hug is the second studio album by Japanese recording artist Yui Aragaki. It was released on June 17, 2009.

== Background ==
The album includes Aragaki's previously released singles "Make My Day ", "Akai Ito", "Piece" and "Utsushie". It was released in three formats: CD+DVD standard edition, limited edition A, which has an illustration cover drawn by Aragaki herself and comes priced at 2,000 yen, and limited edition B, which comes with a bonus CD that includes acoustic renditions of the album tracks. The standard edition DVD includes four music videos as well as making footage of the album.

== Chart performance ==
Hug debuted on the daily Oricon Albums Chart at #3 with 5,897 copies sold. It peaked at #5 on the weekly charts with 22,540 copies sold, making it Aragaki's second consecutive album to debut in the top 5. The album peaked at #30 on the monthly albums chart and was the 216th best-selling album of 2009.

== Track listing ==
Disc 1
No.	Title	Lyrics	Music	Length
1.	"Heart Will Drive"	Emmy	Tanaka Hayato	4:09
2.	"Utsushie" (うつし絵 "Silhouette")	Yūho Iwasato	Kenji Kubo	5:20
3.	"Only You"	Chara	Chara	3:43
4.	"Make My Day"	Keito Blow	Blow	3:44
5.	"Furī Bādo" (フリーバード "Free Bird")	Maki Yano	Yano	5:46
6.	"Shinkaron" (進化論 "Theory of Evolution")	Junji Ishiwatari	Shigeru Kishida	4:13
7.	"La La..."	Yui Aragaki, Yōko Kuzuya	Kuzuya	3:01
8.	"Hachimitsu" (ハチミツ "Honey")	Iwasato	Michitarō Shimamoto, Jun Murayama	4:45
9.	"Piece"	Minako Kawae	Kawae	4:22
10.	"Subako" (巣箱 "Nest Box")	Iwasato	Kuzuya	5:20
11.	"Reinbō" (レインボウ "Rainbow")	Kubo	Kubo	3:58
12.	"Akai Ito" (赤い糸 "Red Thread")	Kentarō Kobuchi	Kobuchi	6:21
13.	"Hug"	Aragaki	Kōichi Tsutaya	4:16
Total length:				59:29

Disc 2
No.	Title	Length
1.	"Heart Will Drive" (Naked Voice Version)	2:06
2.	"Utsushie" (Naked Voice Version)	3:50
3.	"Only You" (Naked Voice Version)	3:49
4.	"Make My Day" (Naked Voice Version)	1:34
5.	"Furī Bādo" (Naked Voice Version)	2:17
6.	"Shinkaron" (Naked Voice Version)	3:19
7.	"La La..." (Naked Voice Version)	2:46
8.	"Hachimitsu" (Naked Voice Version)	2:21
9.	"Piece" (Naked Voice Version)	2:46
10.	"Subako" (Naked Voice Version)	3:10
11.	"Reinbō" (Naked Voice Version)	2:13
12.	"Akai Ito" (Naked Voice Version)	3:04
13.	"Hug" (Naked Voice Version)	2:48
Total length:		36:03

DVD
No.	Title	Length
1.	"Piece" (Music Video: Studio Ghibli Version)
2.	"Piece" (Music Video: Yui Aragaki Version)
3.	"Utsushie" (Music Video: Yui Aragaki and Umika Kawashima Version)
4.	"Utsushie" (Music Video: Yui Aragaki Version)
5.	"Album "Hug" Making Footage"

== Charts and sales ==
Chart (2009)	Peak positions	Sales
Japan Billboard Top Albums	4	40,704
Japan Oricon Daily Albums Chart	3	40,704
Japan Oricon Weekly Albums Chart	5	40,704
Japan Oricon Monthly Albums Chart	30	40,704
Japan Oricon Yearly Albums Chart	216	40,704
Japan SoundScan Albums Chart (CD+DVD)	15	40,704
Japan SoundScan Albums Chart (CD)	18	40,704
Taiwan Five Music J-pop/K-pop Chart	2	
Taiwan G-Music J-pop Chart	5	
Taiwan G-Music International Chart	6	

== Release history ==
Region	Date	Label	Format
Japan	June 17, 2009	Warner Music	CD (Limited Edition A)
Japan	June 17, 2009	Warner Music	2CD (Limited Edition B)
Japan	June 17, 2009	Warner Music	CD+DVD (Standard Edition)
Taiwan	July 3, 2009	Warner Music	CD
Hong Kong	July 7, 2009	Warner Music	CD
