= Niji =

Niji may refer to:

- USS Niji (SP-33), a United States Navy patrol boat in commission from 1917 to 1919
- "Niji" (AAA song) (2012)
- "Niji" (album), Yui Aragaki 2010 album
- "Niji" (Fujifabric song) (2005)
- "Niji" (L'Arc-en-Ciel song) (1997)
- "Niji/Himawari/Sore ga Subete sa", a 2003 song by Masaharu Fukuyama
- "Niji", a 1995 song by Denki Groove
- Niji Entertainment, Ronnie James Dio's recording company
- Niji Music, Ronnie James Dio's music publishing company
- Vinsmoke Niji, a fictional character in the One Piece manga and anime series
- Niji, Huarong District (泥矶乡), former township in Ezhou, Hubei
- Nijisanji, Japanese VTuber agency
