= 2019 Hong Kong Open (table tennis) =

Tournament details
- Dates: 6–9 June 2019
- Edition: 2nd
- Competitors: 32S / 16D
- Total prize money: US$175,000
- Venue: Queen Elizabeth Stadium
- Location: Hong Kong

Champions
- Men's singles: (China) Lin Gaoyuan
- Women's singles: (China) Wang Yidi
- Men's doubles: (China) Liang Jingkun (China) Lin Gaoyuan
- Women's doubles: (China) Chen Ke (China) Mu Zi
- Mixed doubles: (Chinese Taipei) Lin Yun-ju (Chinese Taipei) Cheng I-ching

The 2019 Hong Kong Open was a table tennis tournament which took place at Queen Elizabeth Stadium in Hong Kong, from 6 to 9 June 2019 and had a total prize of $175,000.

== Tournament ==
The 2019 Hong Kong Open was the fourth tournament of the 2019 ITTF World Tour and also part of the Hong Kong Open championships, which have been held since 2018.

=== Venue ===
This tournament was held at the Queen Elizabeth Stadium in Hong Kong.

=== Point distribution ===
Below is the point distribution table for each phase of the tournament.

Event	Winner	Finalist	Semi-finalist	Quarter-finalist	Round of 16	Round of 32
Singles	250	125	63	31	16	8
Doubles	200	100	50	25	13	—

=== Prize pool ===
The total prize money is US$175,000.

Event	Winner	Finalist	Semi-finalist	Quarter-finalist	Round of 16	Round of 32
Singles	$18,600	$9,200	$4,500	$2,200	$1,200	$800
Doubles	$6,500	$3,250	$1,625	—	—	—

== Men's singles ==
=== Seeds ===
1. (China) Lin Gaoyuan (Champion)
2. (Japan) Tomokazu Harimoto (final)
3. (China) Liang Jingkun (semi-finals)
4. (Germany) Timo Boll (quarter-finals)
5. (South Korea) Jang Woo-jin (second round)
6. (South Korea) Lee Sang-su (first round)
7. (Sweden) Mattias Falck (quarter-finals)
8. (Japan) Koki Niwa (second round)
9. (Japan) Jun Mizutani (quarter-finals)
10. (England) Liam Pitchford (first round)
11. (South Korea) Lim Jong-hoon (first round)
12. (Germany) Patrick Franziska (first round)
13. (Hong Kong) Wong Chun Ting (second round)
14. (Chinese Taipei) Lin Yun-ju (first round)
15. (Nigeria) Quadri Aruna (second round)
16. (Hong Kong) Ho Kwan Kit (first round)

=== Draw ===
==== Finals ====
Semifinals
1	(China) Lin Gaoyuan	8	11	11	11	11
3	(China) Liang Jingkun	11	9	5	8	6
(China) Zhou Yu	8	11	9	5	8
2	(Japan) Tomokazu Harimoto	11	5	11	11	11

Final
1	(China) Lin Gaoyuan	11	7	8	11	11	11
2	(Japan) Tomokazu Harimoto	3	11	11	6	9	7

==== Top half ====
===== Section 1 =====
First round
1	(China) Lin GY	8	10	11	11	11	12
(Germany) R Walther	11	12	2	5	6	10
(China) Ma T	11	9	11	8	13	11
10	(England) L Pitchford	4	11	8	11	11	8
11	(South Korea) Lim J-h	2	8	11	3	7
(China) Wang CQ	11	11	7	11	11
(France) S Gauzy	11	6	8	11	9	11	11
6	(South Korea) Lee S-s	5	11	11	8	11	8	8

Second round
1	(China) Lin GY	11	11	11	11
(China) Ma T	9	9	5	9
(China) Wang CQ	12	9	11	16	11
(France) S Gauzy	10	11	8	14	5

Quarterfinals
1	(China) Lin GY	10	6	11	11	12	11
(China) Wang CQ	12	11	9	7	10	7

===== Section 2 =====
First round
7	(Sweden) M Falck	11	11	11	11
(Japan) K Yoshimura	9	5	8	7
(Croatia) T Pucar	9	2	11	11	11	12	14
13	(Hong Kong) Wong C T	11	11	6	4	8	14	16
16	(Hong Kong) Ho K K	5	6	10	11	6
(Germany) B Duda	11	11	12	7	11
(Sweden) T Moregard	10	14	4	11	4
3	(China) Liang JK	12	16	11	9	11

Second round
7	(Sweden) M Falck	11	10	11	11	11	5	11
13	(Hong Kong) Wong C T	5	12	13	4	8	11	9
(Germany) B Duda	11	9	5	7	7
3	(China) Liang JK	5	11	11	11	11

Quarterfinals
7	(Sweden) M Falck	13	1	4	8
3	(China) Liang JK	15	11	11	11

==== Bottom half ====
===== Section 3 =====
First round
4	(Germany) T Boll	11	11	13	7	11	10	11
(India) S K Achanta	4	9	11	11	13	12	6
(Japan) M Yoshimura	12	11	11	11
12	(Germany) P Franziska	10	9	2	2
14	(Chinese Taipei) Lin Y-j	11	7	8	5	13
(China) Zhou Y	5	11	11	11	15
(Slovenia) D Jorgic	9	8	11	11	11	14	9
5	(South Korea) Jang W-j	11	11	13	7	6	12	11

Second round
4	(Germany) T Boll	7	12	7	9	11	11	11
(Japan) M Yoshimura	11	10	11	11	7	7	7
(China) Zhou Y	11	11	11	11
5	(South Korea) Jang W-j	3	7	2	5

Quarterfinals
4	(Germany) T Boll	9	9	11	11	11	9	6
(China) Zhou Y	11	11	9	9	5	11	11

===== Section 4 =====
First round
8	(Japan) K Niwa	11	10	13	12	11
(India) S Gnanasekaran	5	12	11	10	5
(Germany) D Qiu	7	11	11	8	11	11	5
9	(Japan) J Mizutani	11	9	7	11	9	13	11
15	(Nigeria) Q Aruna	11	11	9	11	5	10	11
(China) Zheng PF	10	9	11	5	11	12	5
(Sweden) J Persson	11	11	8	10	12	5
2	(Japan) T Harimoto	7	4	11	12	14	11

Second round
8	(Japan) K Niwa	11	11	10	6	5	2
9	(Japan) J Mizutani	4	9	12	11	11	11
15	(Nigeria) Q Aruna	7	8	9	8
2	(Japan) T Harimoto	11	11	11	11

Quarterfinals
9	(Japan) J Mizutani	11	12	4	7	9
2	(Japan) T Harimoto	13	10	11	11	11

== Women's singles ==
=== Seeds ===
1. (Japan) Kasumi Ishikawa (second round)
2. (Japan) Mima Ito (final)
3. (Chinese Taipei) Cheng I-ching (semi-finals)
4. (Japan) Miu Hirano (semi-finals)
5. (South Korea) Suh Hyo-won (quarter-finals)
6. (Hong Kong) Doo Hoi Kem (second round)
7. (Singapore) Feng Tianwei (quarter-finals)
8. (Japan) Saki Shibata (quarter-finals)
9. (Japan) Hitomi Sato (second round)
10. (China) Chen Xingtong (first round)
11. (South Korea) Jeon Ji-hee (first round)
12. (China) He Zhuojia (second round)
13. (Romania) Bernadette Szocs (second round)
14. (Austria) Sofia Polcanova (quarter-finals)
15. (Hong Kong) Lee Ho Ching (first round)
16. (Germany) Xiaona Shan (second round)

=== Draw ===
==== Finals ====
Semifinals
(China) Wang Yidi	11	12	11	11
3	(Chinese Taipei) Cheng I-ching	7	10	7	8
4	(Japan) Miu Hirano	16	10	6	11	11	7
2	(Japan) Mima Ito	18	12	11	9	6	11

Final
(China) Wang Yidi	11	11	11	11
2	(Japan) Mima Ito	3	7	5	6

==== Top half ====
===== Section 1 =====
First round
1	(Japan) K Ishikawa	11	11	11	12
(Canada) Zhang M	5	5	8	10
(China) Wang YD	11	11	12	11
15	(Hong Kong) Lee H C	5	3	10	6
9	(Japan) H Sato	13	3	12	16	6	11	11
(China) Mu Z	15	11	10	14	11	6	7
(Russia) Y Noskova	6	8	5	10
8	(Japan) S Shibata	11	11	11	12

Second round
1	(Japan) K Ishikawa	6	10	8	11	9
(China) Wang YD	11	12	11	8	11
9	(Japan) H Sato	5	10	4	11	7
8	(Japan) S Shibata	11	12	11	3	11

Quarterfinals
(China) Wang YD	11	15	5	10	11	11
8	(Japan) S Shibata	6	13	11	12	4	7

===== Section 2 =====
First round
5	(South Korea) Suh H-w	11	11	11	11
(Portugal) Yu F	7	6	5	7
(Thailand) S Sawettabut	8	3	11	4
13	(Romania) B Szocs	11	11	13	11
12	(China) He ZJ	7	11	11	11	11
(Japan) M Kato	11	6	7	4	7
(South Korea) Park J-h	8	2	8	5
3	(Chinese Taipei) Cheng I-c	11	11	11	11

Second round
5	(South Korea) Suh H-w	11	12	11	7	13
13	(Romania) B Szocs	8	10	7	11	11
12	(China) He ZJ	11	11	8	11	9	4	8
3	(Chinese Taipei) Cheng I-c	2	6	11	9	11	11	11

Quarterfinals
5	(South Korea) Suh H-w	4	7	5	11	8
3	(Chinese Taipei) Cheng I-c	11	11	11	7	11

==== Bottom half ====
===== Section 3 =====
First round
4	(Japan) M Hirano	11	11	5	11	11
(Czech Republic) H Matelova	5	8	11	6	8
(China) Feng YL	11	13	11	16
10	(China) Chen XT	9	11	6	14
16	(Germany) X Shan	8	8	11	11	7	12	11
(Chinese Taipei) Chen S-y	11	11	3	6	11	10	8
(Netherlands) Li J	6	7	12	6	6
7	(Singapore) Feng TW	11	11	10	11	11

Second round
4	(Japan) M Hirano	11	11	15	11
(China) Feng YL	4	7	13	5
16	(Germany) X Shan	11	8	13	8	5	7
7	(Singapore) Feng TW	7	11	11	11	11	11

Quarterfinals
4	(Japan) M Hirano	11	11	12	9	11
7	(Singapore) Feng TW	9	8	10	11	9

===== Section 4 =====
First round
6	(Hong Kong) Doo H K	12	11	11	11
(Luxembourg) S De Nutte	10	6	3	6
(Hong Kong) Soo W Y	9	11	1	2	9
14	(Austria) S Polcanova	11	3	11	11	11
11	(South Korea) Jeon J-h	5	7	11	11	9	8
(China) Sun MY	11	11	5	8	11	11
(Singapore) Yu MY	5	4	7	7
2	(Japan) M Ito	11	11	11	11

Second round
6	(Hong Kong) Doo H K	5	6	3	11	7
14	(Austria) S Polcanova	11	11	11	5	11
(China) Sun MY	5	7	9	5
2	(Japan) M Ito	11	11	11	11

Quarterfinals
14	(Austria) S Polcanova	8	11	10	12	11
2	(Japan) M Ito	11	9	12	14	13

== Men's doubles ==
=== Seeds ===
1. (Chinese Taipei) Chen Chien-an / Chuang Chih-yuan (first round)
2. (Hong Kong) Wong Chun Ting / Ho Kwan Kit (semi-finals)
3. (Romania) Ovidiu Ionescu / (Spain) Alvaro Robles (first round)
4. (South Korea) Lim Jong-hoon / Jang Woo-jin (final)
5. (China) Lin Gaoyuan / Liang Jingkun (Champion)
6. (Chinese Taipei) Liao Cheng-ting / Lin Yun-ju (semi-finals)
7. (Japan) Masataka Morizono / Maharu Yoshimura (quarter-finals)
8. (India) Sathiyan Gnanasekaran / Sharath Kamal Achanta (quarter-finals)

=== Draw ===
First round
2	(Hong Kong) Ho K K (Hong Kong) Wong C T	11	6	11	11
(France) T Flore (France) E Lebesson	6	11	7	3
(India) A Anthony (India) M Thakkar	1	5	7
(Austria) R Gardos (Austria) D Habesohn	11	11	11
5	(China) Liang JK (China) Lin GY	11	11	11
(England) P Drinkhall (England) S Walker	5	5	5
8	(India) S K Achanta (India) S Gnanasekaran	12	4	11	11
3	(Romania) O Ionescu (Spain) A Robles	10	11	9	7
4	(South Korea) Jang W-j (South Korea) Lim J-h	w/o
(Sweden) K Karlsson (Sweden) J Persson
(Czech Republic) T Polansky (Czech Republic) P Sirucek	6	5	6
7	(Japan) M Morizono (Japan) M Yoshimura	11	11	11
1	(Chinese Taipei) Chen C-a (Chinese Taipei) Chuang C-y
(Belgium) R Devos (Finland) B Olah	w/o
(Portugal) T Apolonia (Portugal) J Monteiro	9	11	11	11	4
6	(Chinese Taipei) Liao C-t (Chinese Taipei) Lin Y-j	11	8	13	9	11

Quarterfinals
2	(Hong Kong) Ho K K (Hong Kong) Wong C T	10	11	11	13
(Austria) R Gardos (Austria) D Habesohn	12	7	4	11
5	(China) Liang JK (China) Lin GY	11	11	11	11
8	(India) S K Achanta (India) S Gnanasekaran	4	3	13	8
4	(South Korea) Jang W-j (South Korea) Lim J-h	11	11	11
7	(Japan) M Morizono (Japan) M Yoshimura	7	5	9
(Belgium) R Devos (Finland) B Olah	9	4	5
6	(Chinese Taipei) Liao C-t (Chinese Taipei) Lin Y-j	11	11	11

Semifinals
2	(Hong Kong) Ho K K (Hong Kong) Wong C T	5	8	11	9
5	(China) Liang JK (China) Lin GY	11	11	9	11
4	(South Korea) Jang W-j (South Korea) Lim J-h	0	11	15	13
6	(Chinese Taipei) Liao C-t (Chinese Taipei) Lin Y-j	11	5	13	11

Final
5	(China) Liang JK (China) Lin GY	6	11	12	11
4	(South Korea) Jang W-j (South Korea) Lim J-h	11	6	10	8

== Women's doubles ==
=== Seeds ===
1. (Czech Republic) Hana Matelova / (Slovakia) Barbora Balazova (first round)
2. (China) Chen Ke / Mu Zi (Champion)
3. (Chinese Taipei) Chng Hsien-tzu / Chen Szu-yu (first round)
4. (Hong Kong) Lee Ho Ching / Doo Hoi Kem (quarter-finals)
5. (Japan) Miu Hirano / Kasumi Ishikawa (first round)
6. (South Korea) Yoo Eun-chong / Jeon Ji-hee (final)
7. (Singapore) Lin Ye / Zeng Jian (quarter-finals)
8. (Hong Kong) Soo Wai Yam / Ng Wing Nam (semi-finals)

=== Draw ===
First round
4	(Hong Kong) Doo H K (Hong Kong) Lee H C	11	12	11
(India) M Batra (India) A Kamath	6	10	7
(Japan) M Kihara (Japan) M Nagasaki	8	11	11	11
5	(Japan) M Hirano (Japan) K Ishikawa	11	7	5	3
2	(China) Chen k (China) Mu Z	11	11	11
(Russia) Y Noskova (Russia) O Vorobeva	9	5	6
(Thailand) O Paranang (Thailand) S Sawettabut	11	11	8	11
1	(Slovakia) B Balazova (Czech Republic) H Matelova	6	6	11	8
6	(South Korea) Jeon J-h (South Korea) Yoo E-c	11	11	11
(Romania) I Ciobanu (Romania) B szocs	6	8	4
(Spain) M Xiao (Canada) M Zhang	11	11	11	3	5
7	(Singapore) Lin Y (Singapore) Zeng J	7	13	6	11	11
3	(Chinese Taipei) Chen S-y (Chinese Taipei) Cheng H-t	11	7	11	8	8
(Austria) Y Hamamoto (Austria) S Polcanova	3	11	6	11	11
(Italy) G Piccolin (Italy) Debora Vivarelli	1	3	6
8	(Hong Kong) Ng W N (Hong Kong) Soo W Y	11	11	11

Quarterfinals
4	(Hong Kong) Doo H K (Hong Kong) Lee H C	3	11	11	9
(Japan) M Kihara (Japan) M Nagasaki	11	13	7	11
2	(China) Chen k (China) Mu Z	w/o
(Thailand) O Paranang (Thailand) S Sawettabut
6	(South Korea) Jeon J-h (South Korea) Yoo E-c	6	11	11	11
7	(Singapore) Lin Y (Singapore) Zeng J	11	4	9	9
(Austria) Y Hamamoto (Austria) S Polcanova	3	11	11	12	12
8	(Hong Kong) Ng W N (Hong Kong) Soo W Y	11	4	7	14	14

Semifinals
(Japan) M Kihara (Japan) M Nagasaki	6	11	8	9
2	(China) Chen k (China) Mu Z	11	9	11	11
6	(South Korea) Jeon J-h (South Korea) Yoo E-c	5	11	11	11
8	(Hong Kong) Ng W N (Hong Kong) Soo W Y	11	8	9	7

Final
2	(China) Chen k (China) Mu Z	9	11	11	11
6	(South Korea) Jeon J-h (South Korea) Yoo E-c	11	1	4	5

== Mixed doubles ==
=== Seeds ===
1. (Austria) Stefan Fegerl / Sofia Polcanova (quarter-finals)
2. (Hong Kong) Ho Kwan Kit / Lee Ho Ching (quarter-finals)
3. (South Korea) Jang Woo-jin / Jeon Ji-hee (first round)
4. (South Korea) Lee Sang-su / Choi Hyo-joo (final)
5. (Chinese Taipei) Cheng I-ching / Lin Yun-ju (Champion)
6. (Slovakia) Lubomir Pistej / Barbora Balazova (first round)
7. (Hungary) Szandra Pergel / Adam Szudi (first round)
8. (Hong Kong) Wong Chun Ting / Doo Hoi Kem (semi-finals)

=== Draw ===
First round
8	(Hong Kong) Wong C T (Hong Kong) Doo H K	12	11	7	11
(Japan) T Harimoto (Japan) H Hayata	10	5	11	2
(France) T Flore (France) L Gasnier	11	11	11
7	(Hungary) A Szudi (Hungary) S Pergel	7	5	9
5	(Chinese Taipei) Lin Y-j (Chinese Taipei) Cheng I-c	11	11	11
(Serbia) A Karakasevic (Serbia) I Lupulesku	7	7	3
(France) E Lebesson (France) Yuan J N	8	11	11	9	8
2	(Hong Kong) Ho K K (Hong Kong) Lee H C	11	3	6	11	11
3	(South Korea) Jang W-j (South Korea) Jeon J-h	3	11	7	11	8
(China) Zhou Y (China) Chen XT	11	8	11	9	11
(Russia) K Skachkov (Russia) O Vorobeva	6	9	9
1	(Austria) S Fegerl (Austria) S Polcanova	11	11	11
4	(South Korea) Lee S-s (South Korea) Choi H-j	11	8	11	11
(Romania) O Ionescu (Romania) B Szocs	9	11	7	5
(China) Ma T (China) Wu Y	11	11	11
6	(Slovakia) L Pistej (Slovakia) B Balazova	8	8	8

Quarterfinals
8	(Hong Kong) Wong C T (Hong Kong) Doo H K	11	11	11
(France) T Flore (France) L Gasnier	5	4	3
5	(Chinese Taipei) Lin Y-j (Chinese Taipei) Cheng I-c	8	11	4	12	11
2	(Hong Kong) Ho K K (Hong Kong) Lee H C	11	4	11	10	3
(China) Zhou Y (China) Chen XT	12	3	11	11
1	(Austria) S Fegerl (Austria) S Polcanova	10	11	5	8
4	(South Korea) Lee S-s (South Korea) Choi H-j	18	11	13	11
(China) Ma T (China) Wu Y	20	6	11	5

Semifinals
8	(Hong Kong) Wong C T (Hong Kong) Doo H K	11	11	4	1	5
5	(Chinese Taipei) Lin Y-j (Chinese Taipei) Cheng I-c	6	9	11	11	11
(China) Zhou Y (China) Chen XT	11	8	7	10
4	(South Korea) Lee S-s (South Korea) Choi H-j	8	11	11	12

Final
5	(Chinese Taipei) Lin Y-j (Chinese Taipei) Cheng I-c	11	11	11
4	(South Korea) Lee S-s (South Korea) Choi H-j	8	3	7
