= Hong Kong Open =

Events called the Hong Kong Open include:

- Hong Kong Open (badminton), a badminton tournament held in Hong Kong since 1982
- Hong Kong Open (golf), a golf tournament which is co-sanctioned by the Asian Tour and the European Tour
- Hong Kong Open (snooker), a professional snooker tournament only held in 1989.
- Hong Kong Open (squash) a squash tournament held annually.
- Hong Kong Open (tennis), a tennis tournament held in Hong Kong on the Grand Prix tour (1973–1987), ATP Tour (1990–2002, 2024–present), and WTA Tour (1980–1982, 1993, 2014–present).
- Hong Kong Open (table tennis), a table tennis tournament held for the first time in 2018.
- Hong Kong Open (darts), a darts tournament that began in 2005.
