= List of Legal High (Japanese TV series) episodes =

Legal High or リーガル・ハイ is a legal drama and comedy Japanese TV drama series that was broadcast on Fuji TV series from 2012. Written by Ryota Furusawa and directed by Junichi Ishikawa. Legal High is a comedy touch on a courtroom drama of two foil character, Kensuke Komikado(Masato Sakai) a shrewd lawyer who has never lost in a lawsuit, and a new lawyer with a strong sense of Justice, Machiko Mayuzumi(Yui Aragaki). Legal High also stars Kotaro Satomi, Junnosuke Taguchi, Eiko Koike, Katsuhisa Namase, Masaki Okada, Haru Kuroki, Ryōko Hirosue, and Masato Yano.

== Series overview ==
Season	Episodes	Originally released		Viewership(%)
Season	Episodes	First released	Last released	Viewership(%)
1	11	April 17, 2012	June 26, 2012	12.5% in Kanto Region
2	10	October 9, 2013	December 18, 2013	18.4% in Kanto Region

== Episodes ==
=== Season 1 ===
No.	Title	Directed by	Original release date	Ratings (%)
1	"最高でもサイテーの弁護士 愛も法も嘘をつく!?"	Junichi Ishikawa	April 17, 2012	12.2%
2	"著作権訴訟はカネになる!?"	Junichi Ishikawa	April 24, 2012	12.1%
3	"初恋かストーカーか? 号泣の恋愛裁判!?"	Hidenori Joho	May 1, 2012	11.2%
4	"太陽を返せ! マンション裁判仁義なき戦い"	Hidenori Joho	May 8, 2012	12.3%
5	"期限は7日! 金か命か!? 悪徳政治家を守れ"	Junichi Ishikawa	May 15, 2012	10.9%
6	"DV? 二股? 流血の離婚裁判 刺客は元妻"	Hidenori Joho	May 22, 2012	11.6%
7	"骨肉の相続争い! 醤油一族に潜む秘密と嘘"	Junichi Ishikawa	May 29, 2012	14.2%
8	"親権を奪え! 天才子役と母の縁切り裁判"	Hidenori Joho	June 5, 2012	14.5%
9	"恩讐の村人よ...美しき故郷を取り戻せ!!"	Junichi Ishikawa	June 12, 2012	12.8%
10	"破産か5億か!? さらば誇り高き絆の里"	Hidenori Joho	June 19, 2012	12.0%
11	"内部告発者を不当解雇から救え!!最強の弁護士がついに敗北!? 真実は常に喜劇だ!!"	Junichi Ishikawa	June 26, 2012	13.4%

=== Season 2 ===
No.	Title	Directed by	Original release date	Ratings (%)
1	"完全復活・古美門研介!すべては依頼人のために無敗の弁護士が非道の悪人に立ち向かう!"	Junichi Ishikawa	October 9, 2013	21.2%
2	"逆ギレ天才起業家〜"つぶやいたら"名誉毀損?"	Junichi Ishikawa	October 16, 2013	16.8%
3	"顔か? 心か? どちらを選ぶ? 前代未聞の整形裁判"	Hidenori Joho	October 23, 2013	18.5%
4	"お隣り付き合いは蜜の味!? 嫉妬渦巻く隣人裁判!!"	Mizunari Nishisaka	October 30, 2013	18.3%
5	"権利は誰のもの? 窓際社員のキャラクター裁判!!"	Junichi Ishikawa	November 6, 2013	18.3%
6	"新しい愛の形か重婚か!? 訴えられた妻は夫が3人"	Hidenori Joho	November 13, 2013	17.7%
7	"天才か暴君か!? 世界的アニメ監督パワハラ裁判!!"	Mizunari Nishisaka	November 20, 2013	17.7%
8	"世界に誇る自然遺産を守れ!! 住民訴訟驚きの真実"	Junichi Ishikawa	November 27, 2013	16.2%
9	"ついに最高裁! 例え全国民が敵でも必ず命を救う"	Hidenori Joho	December 11, 2013	18.4%
10	"二転三転する最後の法廷!!執念で救え依頼人!! 真実は悲劇か喜劇か!?"	Junichi Ishikawa	December 18, 2013	18.9%

=== Special episodes ===
Title	Directed by	Original release date	Ratings (%)
"人気法廷コメディ完全新作 慰謝料1億円で学校を訴えろ!闇の首謀者と微笑の女教師...隠された真実と裁判長の闇"	Junichi Ishikawa	April 13, 2013	13.5%
"大人気法廷ドラマ完全新作!! 大病院で起きた突然死隠された医療ミス!?...愛憎が渦巻く白い巨塔崖っぷち裁判の行方"	Junichi Ishikawa	November 22, 2014	15.1%
