= Legal High (Japanese TV series) =

Japanese legal drama series

- Also known as: Rigaru Hai
- リーガル・ハイ
- Genre: Legal drama; Comedy
- Written by: Ryota Kosawa
- Directed by: Junichi Ishikawa; Hidenori Joho
- Starring: Masato Sakai; Yui Aragaki; Junnosuke Taguchi; Eiko Koike; Katsuhisa Namase; Masaki Okada; Haru Kuroki; Ryōko Hirosue; Masato Yano; Kotaro Satomi
- Opening theme: Erepyon by Erena Ono (Season 1); RE: by 9nine (Season 2)
- Ending theme: Megami no Kisu by PES (Season 1); SLY by RIP SLYME (Season 2)
- Composers: Yuki Hayashi; Yuji Ohno
- Country of origin: Japan
- Original language: Japanese
- No. of seasons: 2
- No. of episodes: 21 (list of episodes)

Production
- Running time: 54 minutes (Not Including First or Last episodes)
- Production companies: Kyodo Television; Fuji Television

Original release
- Network: Fuji TV
- Release: April 17, 2012 – December 18, 2013

Related
- Legal High (South Korea)

Legal High (Japanese: リーガル・ハイ, Hepburn: Rīgaru Hai) is a Japanese television drama series written by Ryōta Kosawa. It was broadcast on Fuji TV from April 2012 to November 2014. The series is a legal drama that follows Kensuke Komikado (Masato Sakai), a shrewd lawyer who has never lost a lawsuit, and Machiko Mayuzumi (Yui Aragaki), an up-and-coming lawyer with a strong sense of justice. Legal High also starred Kotaro Satomi, Junnosuke Taguchi, Eiko Koike, Katsuhisa Namase, Masaki Okada, Haru Kuroki, Ryōko Hirosue, and Masato Yano.

== Seasons ==
Season	Episodes	Originally released		Viewership
Season	Episodes	First released	Last released	Viewership
1	11	April 17, 2012	June 26, 2012	12.5% in Kanto Region
2	10	October 9, 2013	December 18, 2013	18.4% in Kanto Region

== Synopsis ==
=== Season 1 ===
Machiko Mayuzumi (Yui Aragaki) is a bright up-and-coming lawyer who has a strong sense of justice and is passionate about protecting the meek. She starts her career defending a man who is charged with suspected murder and is being put under duress to confess to the crime. During the case, however, her boss Miki insists that Mayuzumi gets the suspect cleared of the charges, but Mayuzumi is unable to do so. However, Miki's secretary Kimie Sawachi informs Mayuzumi that there is a lawyer who has won every case so far in his career who could possibly help. With the will to succeed, Mayuzumi goes on a hunt to find the man. He is eventually found by Mayuzumi and is revealed to be Kensuke Komikado (Masato Sakai), a shallow man whose only desires are money, women and prestige. Despite all of his flaws, Mayuzumi is determined to win the case and asks Komikado if he can assist her in representing the defendant.

=== Season 2 ===
Haruki Hanyu (Masaki Okada) worked as a prosecutor for Kensuke Komikado until he left and created his own law firm named Nexus which, coincidentally, is around the same time that Komikado (Masato Sakai) created his own law firm. Throughout the course of Season 2, the two rival law firms meet on opposite sides of the courtroom on numerous occasions.

== Cast ==
=== Main ===
- Kensuke Komikado (Masato Sakai, child: Yuji Sakaguchi) is a lawyer from Kagoshima Prefecture who gathers powerful testimonies and creates strong arguments, making it difficult for his rivals to refute his logic or counter his arguments. He passed the bar exam despite graduating from a third-rate university. His father (a famous prosecutor in local Kagoshima) had disowned him as a son because of the dishonour of him attending such a lowly educational institute. Komikado loves wine and cigars. Komikado's credo is: there is no value in suspects' justice and human rights, nor warmth and reconciliation. The main point of a law case for him is to win.
- Machiko Mayuzumi (Yui Aragaki, child: Hatakeyama Tsumugi) is a lawyer who is, according to Komikado, an "asadora" heroine with her attitude on justice and work ethics. She is from the Kanagawa Prefecture and the eldest daughter of a salaryman. She attended the Osaka Shoin Women's University attached elementary and junior high schools, graduated from a municipal co-educational high school, and gained her degree from the Waseda University Faculty of Law. She had left Miki Law Firm to transfer to Komikado Law Firm to learn the skills of Kensuke Komikado. She is Komikado's foil.

=== Recurring ===
- Kaga Ranmaru (Junnosuke Taguchi) works as a spy for Komikado, conducting illegal actions which include trespassing and infiltration.
- Hattori (Kotaro Satomi) is the clerk of Komikado Law Firm. He is a man in his 60s, and seems to have knowledge of everything from martial arts to makeup. He is also a skilled chef.
- Choichiro Miki (Katsuhisa Namase) is the former boss of Mayuzumi and the head of Miki Law Firm. He is the mortal enemy of Kensuke Komikado.
- Kimie Sawachi (Eiko Koike) is the extremely intelligent secretary of Miki. She's a great lawyer and can prove to be a fierce foe, especially seen when confronting spies like Ranmaru.
- Takao Ide (Masato Yano) is Miki's assistant lawyer that obeys Miki's every order, but does not have any beliefs or opinions of his own.
- Haruki Hanyu (Masaki Okada) is a former prosecutor for Komikado who left to establish Nexus Law Firm. He completed law school from Keio University. He believes a trial is only truly won when it results in a win-win situation where everybody can benefit.
- Jane Honda (Haru Kuroki) is a former prosecutor that currently works as a lawyer at Nexus Law Firm.
- Kunimitsu Isogai (Kanji Furutachi) is a lawyer originally employed at Miki Law Firm, from which he left due to the "toxic" culture.
- Toshiko Beppu (Ryōko Hirosue) is a judge with a cool persona that has a natural rivalry towards Komikado.
- Daigo Minoru (Ken Matsudaira) is the chief prosecutor employed by the Tokyo High Public Prosecutor's Office.
- Kiwa Ando (Koyuki) is accused on suspicion of the murder of her ex-husband and is sentenced to death.

== Awards ==
Year	Award	Category	Result	Recipient
2012	June Galaxy Award	Outstanding Performance	Won	Masato Sakai
2012	The 50th Galaxy Award	Individual Award	Won	Masato Sakai
2012	The 73rd Drama Academy Awards	Director Award	Won	Junichi Ishikawa
2012	International Drama Festival in Tokyo	Best Actor	Won	Masato Sakai
2013	The 79th Drama Academy Awards	Director Award	Won	Junichi Ishikawa
2013	The 79th Drama Academy Awards	Best Actor	Won	Masato Sakai
2013	The 79th Drama Academy Awards	Best Supporting Actor	Won	Masaki Okada
2013	The 79th Drama Academy Awards	Best Supporting Actress	Won	Aragaki Yui

== Remake ==
A Korean adaptation of the series starring Jin Goo and Seo Eun-soo aired in February 2019 on JTBC.
