= Ri Myong-sun =

North Korean table tennis player

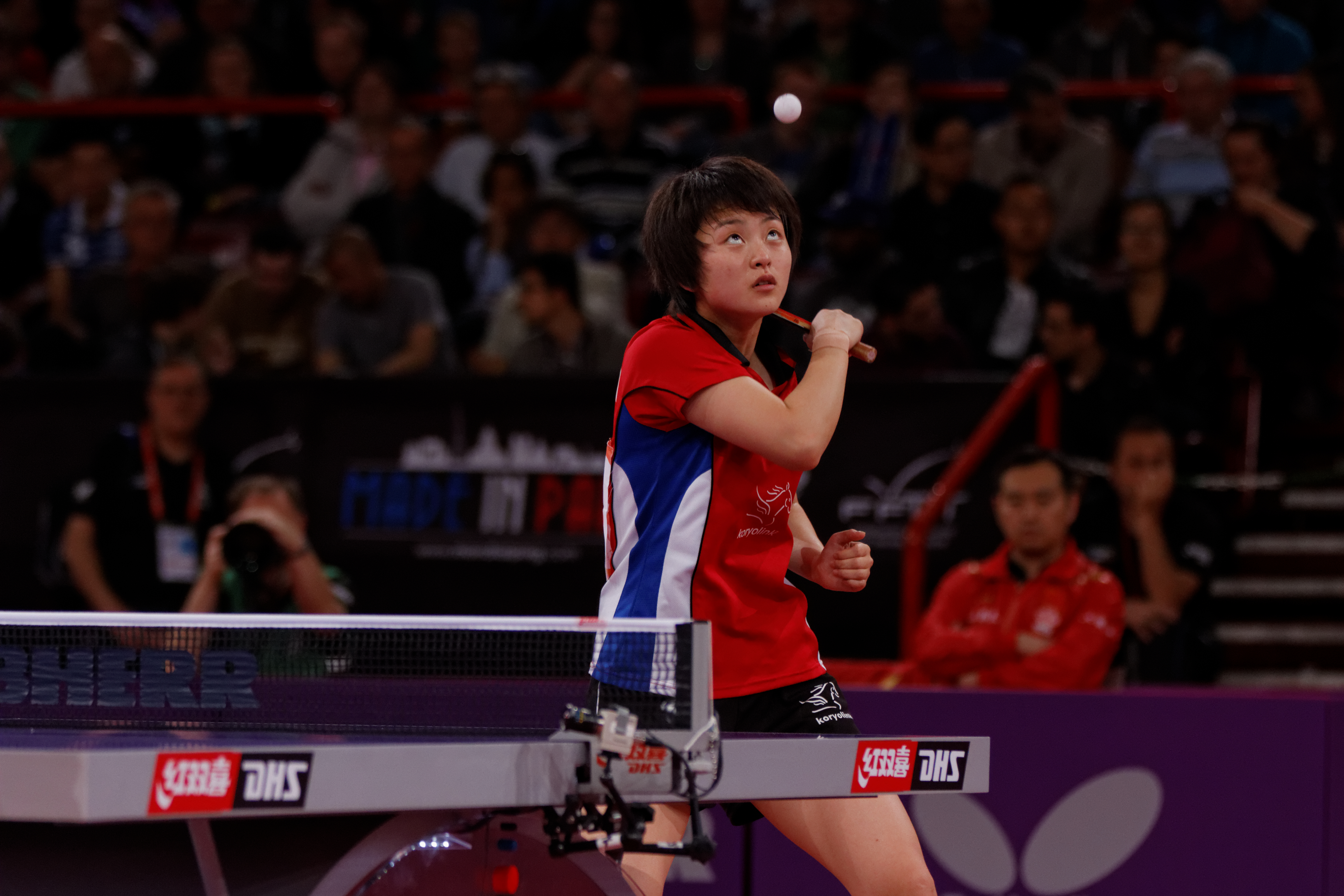
- Ri, 2013 World Table Tennis Championships

Personal information
- Nationality: North Korea
- Born: 26 January 1992 (age 34) Pyongyang
- Height: 163 cm (5 ft 4 in)
- Weight: 54 kg (119 lb)

Sport
- Sport: Table tennis
- Club: Beijing / Weishan County (China)
- Highest ranking: 20 (May 2014)
Medal record
World Championships
Bronze medal – third place	2016 Kuala Lumpur	Team

- Ri Myong-sun
- Hangul: 리명순
- Hanja: 李明順
- RR: Ri Myeongsun
- MR: Ri Myŏngsun

Ri Myong-sun (Korean pronunciation: [ɾi.mjʌŋ.sun]; born 26 January 1992) is a North Korean table tennis player. She competed for North Korea at the 2012 Summer Olympics. She went on to compete for North Korea again at the 2016 Summer Olympics, where she beat Petrissa Solja of Germany in the third round of the women's singles. At both competitions, she competed in the women's singles and the women's team events.
