= Mixed Doubles (2017 film) =

- Mexican film poster
- Directed by: Junichi Ishikawa
- Written by: Ryota Kosawa
- Produced by: Hiroaki Narikawa; Kei Kajimoto; Shinya Furugori
- Starring: Yui Aragaki; Eita; Ryōko Hirosue; Koji Seto; Mei Nagano; Hayato Sano; Yū Aoi; Yōko Maki; Misako Tanaka; Kenichi Endō; Fumiyo Kohinata
- Cinematography: Akira Sako
- Music by: Kenichiro Suehiro
- Distributed by: Toho (Japan) ifilm (Taiwan)
- Release date: October 21, 2017 (Japan)
- Running time: 119 minutes
- Country: Japan
- Language: Japanese

Mixed Doubles (Japanese: ミックス, Hepburn: Mikkusu; lit. "Mix") is a 2017 Japanese romantic comedy film. The second co-project of director Junichi Ishikawa and screenwriter Ryota Kosawa after the 2015 film April Fools, it stars Yui Aragaki and Eita. It was released October 21, 2017.

== Plot ==
Tomita Tamako is a child table tennis prodigy. She undergoes vigorous table tennis training by her mom. But after her mom dies, she quits the sport and refuses to play again.

At work, she begins a relationship with the company's star table tennis player Ejima Akihiko. Akihiko cheats on her with the company's newly recruited female table tennis player, Airi Ogasawara, and they break up. Dejected, Tamako quits her job and returns to her hometown.

Tamako's father, a taxi driver, tells her that he is deeply in debt and will need to close the family's tennis club. He asks her to at least contribute to the household. She begins working in a canned food factory. Motivated by the need to advertise the club and Akihiko's success, she decides to enter the national table tournament with the other five club members as mixed doubles because it is easier than competing as singles. She reluctantly partners with Hagiwara Hisashi, a divorced former boxer who is working in construction nearby. Hagi has taken up table tennis and joined the club, because he hears his daughter has taken up the sport.

All 3 pairs suffer defeat in the regional tournament, but they vow to continue training in order to compete again one year later. They play against other table tennis clubs and even the Chinese restaurant chef and waitress, who were China national table tennis team rejects, to help with their training. After months of intense training, Tamako and Hagi finally defeat the Chinese restaurant pair and are ready for the regional tournament.

Hagi's ex-wife and daughter turn up at the table tennis club and say they would forgive him and have gotten him a job interview. The job interview is on the same day as the tournament. Realizing this is a chance for Hagi to re-establish his relationship with his family, Tamako decides not to join the tournament and goes back to her job at the canned food factory. The other members also decide to quit.

On the day of the tournament, the youngest member of the club decides to go after all and texts the others. They all rush there and compete as planned. Hagi seeks out Tamako at the factory and tells her that his ex-wife has already remarried, and she and his daughter are happy with their new lives. He declares his love for Tamako.

The pair arrives at the tournament in time for their match. They advance to the final and face Akihiko and Airi. The match lasts until the last set when Ejima Akihiko wins the match by a lucky reflex save.

Despite the loss, Tamako and Hagi achieve fame as national tournament players, and they turn the small club into a hugely popular club together.

== Cast ==
- Yui Aragaki plays Tamako Tomita (富田 多満子, Tomita Tamako), an ex-child table tennis prodigy, who grew up to despise the sport.
- Eita plays Hisashi Hagiwara (萩原 久, Hagiwara Hisashi), nicknamed "Hagi" (ハギ), a former championship boxer who tries to play table tennis to cope his failure.
- Ryōko Hirosue plays Yayoi Yoshioka (吉岡 弥生, Yoshioka Yayoi), Tamako's best friend.
- Hayato Sano plays Yuma Sasaki (佐々木 優馬, Sasaki Yuma), a high school student that plays table tennis to avoid school.
- Kenichi Endō plays Motonobu Ochiai (落合 元信, Ochiai Motonobu), a farmer who plays table tennis as a hobby.
- Misako Tanaka plays Mika Ochiai (落合 美佳, Ochiai Mika), Motonobu's wife and also plays table tennis as a hobby.
- Hiroyuki Morisaki plays Cho (張, Zhang(Chinese)), a Sichuanese cook who was expelled from the prestigious Chinese table tennis team and now works at a Chinese restaurant in Japan specialized in Sichuan Cuisine.
- Yū Aoi plays Yo (楊, Yang(Chinese)), a Sichuanese worker who was expelled from the prestigious Chinese table tennis team along with Cho and now works at a Chinese restaurant in Japan specialized in Sichuan Cuisine.
- Yōko Maki plays Hanako Tomita (富田 華子, Tomita Hanako), Tamako's deceased mother and table tennis coach.
- Fumiyo Kohinata plays Tatsuro Tomita (富田 達郎, Tomita Tatsuro), Tamako's father and a Taxi driver.
- Koji Seto plays Akihiko Ejima (江島 晃彦, Ejima Akihiko), Tamako's ex-boyfriend.
- Mei Nagano plays Airi Ogasawara (小笠 原愛莉, Airi Ogasawara), Akihiko's girlfriend.

=== Cameo roles ===
- Kasumi Ishikawa as herself
- Jun Mizutani as himself
- Yui Hamamoto as Moe Matsuda (松田 萌絵, Matsuda Moe), a player from Yokohama Gakuen University
- Maharu Yoshimura as Ryuji Tokushima (徳島 竜司, Tokushima Ryūji), a player from Yokohama Gakuen University
- Mima Ito as Iroha Tadokoro (田所 いろは, Tadokoro Iroha), a player from Sagamihara First High School
- Yuto Kizukuri as Seiya Higashi (東 聖哉, Higashi Seiya), a player from Sagamihara First High School

== Production ==
=== Development ===
Filming began mid-February, 2017 and finished late March 2017.

=== Music ===
Shishamo sang the theme song of the film (ほら、笑ってる,。Hora, waratteru.)

== Reception ==
=== Awards ===
Year	Award	Category	Result	Recipient	Ref
2018	60th Blue Ribbon Awards	Best Actress	Won	Yui Aragaki	
