= 2016 World Team Table Tennis Championships – Women's team =

Women's team at the 2016 World Team Table Tennis Championships
- Venue: Malawati Stadium
- Location: Shah Alam, Malaysia
- Dates: 28 February–6 March

Medalists
| gold medal | Chen Meng; Ding Ning; Li Xiaoxia; Liu Shiwen; Zhu Yuling | China |
| silver medal | Ai Fukuhara; Yui Hamamoto; Kasumi Ishikawa; Mima Ito; Misako Wakamiya | Japan |
| bronze medal | Cha Hyo-sim; Kim Song-i; Ri Mi-gyong; Ri Myong-sun | North Korea |
| bronze medal | Chen Szu-yu; Cheng Hsien-tzu; Cheng I-ching; Lin Chia-hui; Liu Hsing-yin | Chinese Taipei |

The women's team tournament of the 2016 World Team Table Tennis Championships was held from 28 February to 6 March 2016.

All times are local (UTC+8)

== Championship division ==
The top three teams of each group advanced.

=== Preliminary round ===
==== Group A ====
| Team | Pld | W | L | GW | GL | Pts |
|---|---|---|---|---|---|---|
| China | 5 | 5 | 0 | 15 | 0 | 10 |
| Chinese Taipei | 5 | 4 | 1 | 12 | 6 | 9 |
| Romania | 5 | 3 | 2 | 10 | 7 | 8 |
| Hungary | 5 | 2 | 3 | 7 | 9 | 7 |
| Spain | 5 | 1 | 4 | 5 | 12 | 6 |
| Malaysia | 5 | 0 | 5 | 0 | 15 | 5 |

28 February 2016; 10:00 | Report | China | 3–0 | Hungary
Score by game:
Ding Ning | 3–0 | Mercedes Nagyvaradi
Li Xiaoxia | 3–2 | Szandra Pergel
Chen Meng | 3–1 | Dora Madarász

28 February 2016; 10:00 | Report | Chinese Taipei | 3–2 | Spain
Score by game:
Cheng I-ching | 3–0 | Zhang Xuan
Chen Szu-yu | 1–3 | Galia Dvorak
Cheng Hsien-tzu | 0–3 | Shen Yanfei
Cheng I-ching | 3–2 | Galia Dvorak
Chen Szu-yu | 3–0 | Zhang Xuan
–

28 February 2016; 10:00 | Report | Romania | 3–0 | Malaysia
Score by game:
Daniela Dodean | 3–0 | Ng Sock Khim
Elizabeta Samara | 3–0 | Ho Ying
Bernadette Szőcs | 3–0 | Alice Chang

28 February 2016; 16:30 | Report | China | 3–0 | Malaysia
Score by game:
Liu Shiwen | 3–0 | Ho Ying
Zhu Yuling | 3–0 | Ng Sock Khim
Chen Meng | 3–0 | Alice Chang

28 February 2016; 16:30 | Report | Chinese Taipei | 3–0 | Hungary
Score by game:
Chen Szu-yu | 3–0 | Georgina Póta
Cheng I-ching | 3–2 | Petra Lovas
Cheng Hsien-tzu | 3–2 | Szandra Pergel

28 February 2016; 16:30 | Report | Romania | 3–0 | Spain
Score by game:
Daniela Dodean | 3–0 | Galia Dvorak
Elizabeta Samara | 3–0 | Zhang Xuan
Bernadette Szocs | 3–0 | Claudia Caymel

29 February 2016; 13:00 | Report | China | 3–0 | Romania
Score by game:
Liu Shiwen | 3–0 | Adina Diaconu
Li Xiaoxia | 3–2 | Bernadette Szocs
Zhu Yuling | 3–0 | Cristina Hirici

29 February 2016; 13:00 | Report | Chinese Taipei | 3–0 | Malaysia
Score by game:
Chen Szu-yu | 3–0 | Ng Sock Khim
Liu Hsing-yin | 3–0 | Ho Ying
Lin Chia-hui | 3–0 | Amanda Wong

29 February 2016; 13:00 | Report | Hungary | 3–0 | Spain
Score by game:
Georgina Póta | 3–0 | Galia Dvorak
Szandra Pergel | 3–0 | Zhang Xuan
Petra Lovas | 3–1 | Claudia Caymel

1 March 2016; 16:30 | Report | China | 3–0 | Spain
Score by game:
Zhu Yuling | 3–0 | Zhang Xuan
Ding Ning | 3–0 | Galia Dvorak
Li Xiaoxia | 3–0 | Claudia Caymel

1 March 2016; 16:30 | Report | Chinese Taipei | 3–1 | Romania
Score by game:
Cheng I-ching | 3–1 | Daniela Dodean
Chen Szu-yu | 3–2 | Elizabeta Samara
Liu Hsing-yin | 2–3 | Bernadette Szőcs
Cheng I-ching | 3–0 | Elizabeta Samara

1 March 2016; 16:30 | Report | Hungary | 3–0 | Malaysia
Score by game:
Dora Madarász | 3–0 | Ho Ying
Georgina Póta | 3–0 | Alice Chang
Petra Lovas | 3–0 | Ng Sock Khim

2 March 2016; 16:30 | Report | China | 3–0 | Chinese Taipei
Score by game:
Li Xiaoxia | 3–0 | Liu Hsing-yin
Ding Ning | 3–0 | Lin Chia-hui
Liu Shiwen | 3–0 | Cheng Hsien-tzu

2 March 2016; 16:30 | Report | Romania | 3–1 | Hungary
Score by game:
Daniela Dodean | 1–3 | Georgina Póta
Elizabeta Samara | 3–1 | Dora Madarász
Bernadette Szőcs | 3–2 | Szandra Pergel
Elizabeta Samara | 3–2 | Georgina Póta

2 March 2016; 16:30 | Report | Spain | 3–0 | Malaysia
Score by game:
Zhang Xuan | 3–0 | Alice Chang
Claudia Caymel | 3–0 | Ho Ying
Galia Dvorak | 3–0 | Ng Sock Khim

==== Group B ====
| Team | Pld | W | L | GW | GL | Pts |
|---|---|---|---|---|---|---|
| Japan | 5 | 4 | 1 | 13 | 3 | 9 |
| North Korea | 5 | 4 | 1 | 12 | 4 | 9 |
| Germany | 5 | 4 | 1 | 12 | 7 | 9 |
| Czech Republic | 5 | 2 | 3 | 8 | 10 | 7 |
| Thailand | 5 | 1 | 4 | 4 | 13 | 6 |
| Brazil | 5 | 0 | 5 | 3 | 15 | 5 |

28 February 2016; 10:00 | Report | Japan | 3–0 | Czech Republic
Score by game:
Ai Fukuhara | 3–0 | Hana Matelová
Kasumi Ishikawa | 3–2 | Iveta Vacenovská
Mima Ito | 3–0 | Dana Čechová

28 February 2016; 10:00 | Report | Germany | 3–0 | Thailand
Score by game:
Irene Ivancan | 3–0 | Nanthana Komwong
Petrissa Solja | 3–0 | Suthasini Sawettabut
Sabine Winter | 3–0 | Tamolwan Khetkhuan

28 February 2016; 10:00 | Report | North Korea | 3–0 | Brazil
Score by game:
Ri Mi-gyong | 3–0 | Lin Gui
Ri Myong-sun | 3–1 | Caroline Kumahara
Kim Song-i | 3–1 | Lígia Silva

28 February 2016; 19:30 | Report | Japan | 3–0 | Brazil
Score by game:
Kasumi Ishikawa | 3–1 | Caroline Kumahara
Misako Wakamiya | 3–1 | Bruna Takahashi
Yui Hamamoto | 3–0 | Lin Gui

28 February 2016; 19:30 | Report | Germany | 3–0 | Czech Republic
Score by game:
Petrissa Solja | 3–1 | Hana Matelová
Irene Ivancan | 3–2 | Renata Štrbíková
Sabine Winter | 3–1 | Iveta Vacenovská

28 February 2016; 19:30 | Report | North Korea | 3–0 | Thailand
Score by game:
Kim Song-i | 3–0 | Suthasini Sawettabut
Ri Myong-sun | 3–0 | Nanthana Komwong
Ri Mi-gyong | 3–1 | Rattanaporn Rattanavongsa

29 February 2016; 16:30 | Report | Japan | 3–0 | North Korea
Score by game:
Kasumi Ishikawa | 3–1 | Ri Myong-sun
Ai Fukuhara | 3–0 | Ri Mi-gyong
Mima Ito | 3–1 | Kim Song-i

29 February 2016; 16:30 | Report | Germany | 3–2 | Brazil
Score by game:
Kristin Silbereisen | 2–3 | Bruna Takahashi
Irene Ivancan | 3–0 | Lin Gui
Nina Mittelham | 0–3 | Caroline Kumahara
Irene Ivancan | 3–0 | Bruna Takahashi
Kristin Silbereisen | 3–1 | Lin Gui
–

29 February 2016; 16:30 | Report | Czech Republic | 3–1 | Thailand
Score by game:
Hana Matelová | 3–1 | Nanthana Komwong
Iveta Vacenovská | 3–2 | Suthasini Sawettabut
Renata Štrbíková | 2–3 | Tamolwan Khetkhuan
Iveta Vacenovská | 3–1 | Nanthana Komwong

1 March 2016; 16:30 | Report | Japan | 3–0 | Thailand
Score by game:
Ai Fukuhara | 3–1 | Suthasini Sawettabut
Mima Ito | 3–2 | Nanthana Komwong
Yui Hamamoto | 3–1 | Tamolwan Khetkhuan

1 March 2016; 16:30 | Report | Germany | 0–3 | North Korea
Score by game:
Sabine Winter | 0–3 | Ri Mi-gyong
Petrissa Solja | 1–3 | Ri Myong-sun
Irene Ivancan | 1–3 | Kim Song-i

1 March 2016; 16:30 | Report | Czech Republic | 3–0 | Brazil
Score by game:
Iveta Vacenovská | 3–2 | Bruna Takahashi
Hana Matelová | 3–1 | Caroline Kumahara
Dana Čechová | 3–1 | Lin Gui

2 March 2016; 19:30 | Report | Japan | 2–3 | Germany
Score by game:
Kasumi Ishikawa | 3–0 | Kristin Silbereisen
Ai Fukuhara | 0–3 | Petrissa Solja
Mima Ito | 3–1 | Sabine Winter
Kasumi Ishikawa | 2–3 | Petrissa Solja
Ai Fukuhara | 1–3 | Kristin Silbereisen
–

2 March 2016; 19:30 | Report | North Korea | 3–2 | Czech Republic
Score by game:
Ri Mi-gyong | 0–3 | Hana Matelová
Kim Song-i | 3–1 | Iveta Vacenovská
Cha Hyo-sim | 3–2 | Renata Štrbíková
Ri Mi-gyong | 2–3 | Iveta Vacenovská
Kim Song-i | 3–0 | Hana Matelová
–

2 March 2016; 19:30 | Report | Thailand | 3–1 | Brazil
Score by game:
Suthasini Sawettabut | 3–2 | Lin Gui
Nanthana Komwong | 3–2 | Bruna Takahashi
Orawan Paranang | 1–3 | Caroline Kumahara
Suthasini Sawettabut | 3–1 | Bruna Takahashi

==== Group C ====
| Team | Pld | W | L | GW | GL | Pts |
|---|---|---|---|---|---|---|
| Singapore | 5 | 5 | 0 | 15 | 6 | 10 |
| Netherlands | 5 | 3 | 2 | 13 | 10 | 8 |
| Ukraine | 5 | 3 | 2 | 13 | 8 | 8 |
| Belarus | 5 | 2 | 3 | 9 | 12 | 7 |
| Poland | 5 | 1 | 4 | 8 | 13 | 6 |
| France | 5 | 1 | 4 | 6 | 14 | 6 |

28 February 2016; 10:00 | Report | Ukraine | 2–3 | Netherlands
Score by game:
Tetyana Sorochynska | 3–1 | Li Jie
Margaryta Pesotska | 0–3 | Li Jiao
Ganna Gaponova | 3–0 | Britt Eerland
Tetyana Sorochynska | 0–3 | Li Jiao
Margaryta Pesotska | 1–3 | Li Jie
–

28 February 2016; 10:00 | Report | Singapore | 3–1 | France
Score by game:
Feng Tianwei | 3–0 | Pauline Chasselin
Yu Mengyu | 3–2 | Carole Grundisch
Isabelle Li | 1–3 | Audrey Zarif
Feng Tianwei | 3–0 | Carole Grundisch

28 February 2016; 10:00 | Report | Belarus | 3–2 | Poland
Score by game:
Viktoria Pavlovich | 2–3 | Natalia Partyka
Aleksandra Privalova | 3–2 | Katarzyna Grzybowska
Daria Trigolos | 1–3 | Li Qian
Viktoria Pavlovich | 3–1 | Katarzyna Grzybowska
Aleksandra Privalova | 3–2 | Natalia Partyka
–

28 February 2016; 19:30 | Report | Netherlands | 3–1 | Belarus
Score by game:
Li Jiao | 2–3 | Aleksandra Privalova
Li Jie | 3–2 | Viktoria Pavlovich
Britt Eerland | 3–2 | Alina Arlouskaya
Li Jiao | 3–1 | Viktoria Pavlovich

28 February 2016; 19:30 | Report | Singapore | 3–2 | Ukraine
Score by game:
Feng Tianwei | 3–2 | Margaryta Pesotska
Yu Mengyu | 0–3 | Tetyana Sorochynska
Zhang Wanling | 1–3 | Ganna Gaponova
Feng Tianwei | 3–2 | Tetyana Sorochynska
Yu Mengyu | 3–1 | Margaryta Pesotska
–

28 February 2016; 19:30 | Report | Poland | 3–1 | France
Score by game:
Li Qian | 3–0 | Audrey Zarif
Natalia Partyka | 0–3 | Carole Grundisch
Katarzyna Grzybowska | 3–0 | Pauline Chasselin
Li Qian | 3–0 | Carole Grundisch

29 February 2016; 16:30 | Report | Netherlands | 3–1 | Poland
Score by game:
Li Jie | 0–3 | Li Qian
Li Jiao | 3–1 | Natalia Partyka
Britt Eerland | 3–2 | Katarzyna Grzybowska
Li Jie | 3–2 | Natalia Partyka

29 February 2016; 16:30 | Report | Singapore | 3–1 | Belarus
Score by game:
Feng Tianwei | 3–0 | Aleksandra Privalova
Yu Mengyu | 3–0 | Viktoria Pavlovich
Yee Herng Hwee | 2–3 | Daria Trigolos
Feng Tianwei | 3–0 | Viktoria Pavlovich

29 February 2016; 16:30 | Report | Ukraine | 3–0 | France
Score by game:
Margaryta Pesotska | 3–1 | Carole Grundisch
Tetyana Sorochynska | 3–1 | Pauline Chasselin
Ganna Gaponova | 3–0 | Audrey Zarif

1 March 2016; 10:00 | Report | Netherlands | 2–3 | France
Score by game:
Li Jie | 3–0 | Pauline Chasselin
Britt Eerland | 2–3 | Carole Grundisch
Elena Timina | 2–3 | Audrey Zarif
Li Jie | 3–1 | Carole Grundisch
Britt Eerland | 2–3 | Pauline Chasselin
–

1 March 2016; 10:00 | Report | Singapore | 3–1 | Poland
Score by game:
Feng Tianwei | 3–1 | Li Qian
Yu Mengyu | 3–1 | Katarzyna Grzybowska
Zhang Wanling | 0–3 | Klaudia Kusinska
Feng Tianwei | 3–0 | Katarzyna Grzybowska

1 March 2016; 10:00 | Report | Ukraine | 3–1 | Belarus
Score by game:
Tetyana Sorochynska | 0–3 | Viktoria Pavlovich
Margaryta Pesotska | 3–0 | Aleksandra Privalova
Ganna Gaponova | 3–1 | Daria Trigolos
Margaryta Pesotska | 3–0 | Viktoria Pavlovich

2 March 2016; 13:00 | Report | Netherlands | 2–3 | Singapore
Score by game:
Li Jiao | 3–2 | Feng Tianwei
Li Jie | 0–3 | Yu Mengyu
Britt Eerland | 3–0 | Isabelle Li
Li Jie | 0–3 | Feng Tianwei
Li Jiao | 1–3 | Yu Mengyu
–

2 March 2016; 13:00 | Report | Poland | 1–3 | Ukraine
Score by game:
Li Qian | 3–1 | Margaryta Pesotska
Natalia Partyka | 1–3 | Tetyana Sorochynska
Klaudia Kusinska | 2–3 | Ganna Gaponova
Li Qian | 0–3 | Tetyana Sorochynska

2 March 2016; 13:00 | Report | France | 1–3 | Belarus
Score by game:
Carole Grundisch | 3–1 | Aleksandra Privalova
Pauline Chasselin | 0–3 | Viktoria Pavlovich
Marie Migot | 1–3 | Daria Trigolos
Carole Grundisch | 2–3 | Viktoria Pavlovich

==== Group D ====
| Team | Pld | W | L | GW | GL | Pts |
|---|---|---|---|---|---|---|
| Hong Kong | 5 | 5 | 0 | 15 | 3 | 10 |
| South Korea | 5 | 4 | 1 | 13 | 5 | 9 |
| Austria | 5 | 3 | 2 | 10 | 8 | 8 |
| Russia | 5 | 2 | 3 | 9 | 11 | 7 |
| United States | 5 | 1 | 4 | 4 | 12 | 6 |
| Sweden | 5 | 0 | 5 | 3 | 15 | 5 |

28 February 2016; 13:00 | Report | Hong Kong | 3–1 | Russia
Score by game:
Tie Ya Na | 0–3 | Polina Mikhailova
Lee Ho Ching | 3–2 | Yana Noskova
Doo Hoi Kem | 3–0 | Maria Dolgikh
Lee Ho Ching | 3–1 | Polina Mikhailova

28 February 2016; 13:00 | Report | South Korea | 3–1 | United States
Score by game:
Seo Hyo-won | 3–0 | Crystal Wang
Yang Ha-eun | 3–0 | Lily Zhang
Park Young-sook | 0–3 | Wang Chen
Seo Hyo-won | 3–0 | Lily Zhang

28 February 2016; 13:00 | Report | Austria | 3–0 | Sweden
Score by game:
Liu Jia | 3–0 | Matilda Ekholm
Sofia Polcanova | 3–0 | Daniela Moskovits
Li Qiangbing | 3–1 | Linda Bergström

28 February 2016; 19:30 | Report | Hong Kong | 3–1 | Sweden
Score by game:
Lee Ho Ching | 2–3 | Matilda Ekholm
Doo Hoi Kem | 3–0 | Jennifer Jonsson
Jiang Huajun | 3–0 | Linda Bergström
Lee Ho Ching | 3–0 | Jennifer Jonsson

28 February 2016; 19:30 | Report | South Korea | 3–0 | Russia
Score by game:
Yang Ha-eun | 3–0 | Polina Mikhailova
Seo Hyo-won | 3–2 | Anna Tikhomirova
Park Young-sook | 3–1 | Yana Noskova

28 February 2016; 19:30 | Report | Austria | 3–0 | United States
Score by game:
Sofia Polcanova | 3–1 | Wang Chen
Liu Jia | 3–2 | Lily Zhang
Li Qiangbing | 3–2 | Zheng Jiaqi

29 February 2016; 13:00 | Report | Hong Kong | 3–0 | Austria
Score by game:
Tie Ya Na | 3–0 | Sofia Polcanova
Doo Hoi Kem | 3–0 | Liu Jia
Lee Ho Ching | 3–0 | Li Qiangbing

29 February 2016; 13:00 | Report | South Korea | 3–0 | Sweden
Score by game:
Seo Hyo-won | 3–2 | Matilda Ekholm
Yang Ha-eun | 3–0 | Jennifer Jonsson
Lee Zion | 3–1 | Linda Bergström

29 February 2016; 13:00 | Report | Russia | 3–0 | United States
Score by game:
Polina Mikhailova | 3–2 | Zheng Jiaqi
Yana Noskova | 3–1 | Wang Chen
Anna Tikhomirova | 3–1 | Lily Zhang

1 March 2016; 10:00 | Report | Hong Kong | 3–0 | United States
Score by game:
Lee Ho Ching | 3–0 | Zheng Jiaqi
Doo Hoi Kem | 3–0 | Lily Zhang
Jiang Huajun | 3–0 | Prachi Jha

1 March 2016; 10:00 | Report | South Korea | 3–1 | Austria
Score by game:
Seo Hyo-won | 3–0 | Liu Jia
Yang Ha-eun | 1–3 | Sofia Polcanova
Park Young-sook | 3–2 | Li Qiangbing
Seo Hyo-won | 3–1 | Sofia Polcanova

1 March 2016; 10:00 | Report | Russia | 3–2 | Sweden
Score by game:
Polina Mikhailova | 3–0 | Linda Bergström
Maria Dolgikh | 1–3 | Matilda Ekholm
Yana Noskova | 3–1 | Jennifer Jonsson
Polina Mikhailova | 0–3 | Matilda Ekholm
Maria Dolgikh | 3–2 | Linda Bergström
–

2 March 2016; 10:00 | Report | Hong Kong | 3–1 | South Korea
Score by game:
Doo Hoi Kem | 0–3 | Seo Hyo-won
Lee Ho Ching | 3–2 | Yang Ha-eun
Jiang Huajun | 3–1 | Park Young-sook
Doo Hoi Kem | 3–1 | Yang Ha-eun

2 March 2016; 10:00 | Report | Austria | 3–2 | Russia
Score by game:
Liu Jia | 1–3 | Polina Mikhailova
Sofia Polcanova | 3–0 | Maria Dolgikh
Li Qiangbing | 3–1 | Yana Noskova
Sofia Polcanova | 0–3 | Polina Mikhailova
Liu Jia | 3–1 | Maria Dolgikh
–

2 March 2016; 10:00 | Report | USA | 3–0 | Sweden
Score by game:
Lily Zhang | 3–0 | Daniela Moskovits
Wang Chen | 3–2 | Linda Bergström
Zheng Jiaqi | 3–2 | Jennifer Jonsson

=== Knockout stage ===
The group winners of Groups C and D were drawn, as well as the second and third placed teams. Same for the fourth, fifth and sixth placed teams.

==== Places 13–24 ====
Round of 16
Malaysia | 0
Poland | 3
United States | 3
Brazil | 1
France | 3
Spain | 1
Thailand | 3
Sweden | 0

Quarterfinals
Hungary | 3
Poland | 1
United States | 1
Belarus | 3
Czech Republic | 3
France | 1
Thailand | 3
Russia | 2

Semifinals
Hungary | 3
Belarus | 1
Czech Republic | 1
Thailand | 3

Final

==== Places 1–12 ====
Round of 16
Austria | 2
Netherlands | 3
Chinese Taipei | 3
Ukraine | 2
Romania | 0
North Korea | 3
South Korea | 0
Germany | 3

Quarterfinals
China | 3
Netherlands | 0
Chinese Taipei | 3
Hong Kong | 2
Singapore | 2
North Korea | 3
Germany | 0
Japan | 3

Semifinals
China | 3
Chinese Taipei | 0
North Korea | 1
Japan | 3

Final
China | 3
Japan | 0

===== Round of 16 =====
3 March 2016; 10:00 | Report | Austria | 2–3 | Netherlands
Score by game:
Liu Jia | 3–0 | Li Jie
Li Qiangbing | 3–0 | Li Jiao
Sofia Polcanova | 1–3 | Britt Eerland
Liu Jia | 0–3 | Li Jiao
Li Qiangbing | 2–3 | Li Jie
–

3 March 2016; 10:00 | Report | Romania | 0–3 | North Korea
Score by game:
Daniela Dodean | 1–3 | Ri Myong-sun
Elizabeta Samara | 0–3 | Kim Song-i
Bernadette Szőcs | 2–3 | Ri Mi-gyong

3 March 2016; 13:00 | Report | South Korea | 0–3 | Germany
Score by game:
Seo Hyo-won | 2–3 | Sabine Winter
Yang Ha-eun | 0–3 | Petrissa Solja
Park Young-sook | 1–3 | Irene Ivancan

3 March 2016; 16:30 | Report | Chinese Taipei | 3–2 | Ukraine
Score by game:
Chen Szu-yu | 0–3 | Tetyana Sorochynska
Cheng I-ching | 3–1 | Margaryta Pesotska
Lin Chia-hui | 0–3 | Ganna Gaponova
Cheng I-ching | 3–0 | Tetyana Sorochynska
Chen Szu-yu | 3–1 | Margaryta Pesotska
–

===== Quarterfinals =====
3 March 2016; 19:30 | Report | China | 3–0 | Netherlands
Score by game:
Liu Shiwen | 3–1 | Li Jiao
Li Xiaoxia | 3–1 | Britt Eerland
Ding Ning | 3–2 | Li Jie

3 March 2016; 19:30 | Report | Germany | 0–3 | Japan
Score by game:
Sabine Winter | 1–3 | Mima Ito
Petrissa Solja | 1–3 | Kasumi Ishikawa
Kristin Silbereisen | 1–3 | Ai Fukuhara

4 March 2016; 10:00 | Report | Chinese Taipei | 3–2 | Hong Kong
Score by game:
Chen Szu-yu | 0–3 | Doo Hoi Kem
Cheng I-ching | 3–2 | Tie Ya Na
Cheng Hsien-tzu | 2–3 | Lee Ho Ching
Cheng I-ching | 3–1 | Doo Hoi Kem
Chen Szu-yu | 3–1 | Tie Ya Na
–

4 March 2016; 13:00 | Report | Singapore | 2–3 | North Korea
Score by game:
Feng Tianwei | 3–2 | Kim Song-i
Yu Mengyu | 0–3 | Ri Myong-sun
Yee Herng Hwee | 0–3 | Ri Mi-gyong
Feng Tianwei | 3–1 | Ri Myong-sun
Yu Mengyu | 2–3 | Kim Song-i
–

===== Semifinals =====
4 March 2016; 19:30 | Report | North Korea | 1–3 | Japan
Score by game:
Kim Song-i | 3–0 | Mima Ito
Ri Myong-sun | 0–3 | Kasumi Ishikawa
Ri Mi-gyong | 1–3 | Ai Fukuhara
Ri Myong-sun | 2–3 | Mima Ito

5 March 2016; 16:30 | Report | China | 3–0 | Chinese Taipei
Score by game:
Ding Ning | 3–0 | Chen Szu-yu
Li Xiaoxia | 3–0 | Cheng I-ching
Zhu Yuling | 3–0 | Cheng Hsien-tzu

===== Final =====
6 March 2016; 14:30 | Report | China | 3–0 | Japan
Score by game:
Liu Shiwen | 3–0 | Ai Fukuhara
Li Xiaoxia | 3–2 | Kasumi Ishikawa
Ding Ning | 3–1 | Mima Ito

== Division 2 ==
=== Preliminary round ===
==== Group E ====
| Team | Pld | W | L | GW | GL | Pts |
|---|---|---|---|---|---|---|
| Serbia | 5 | 5 | 0 | 15 | 1 | 10 |
| England | 5 | 4 | 1 | 13 | 6 | 9 |
| Belgium | 5 | 2 | 3 | 7 | 9 | 7 |
| Turkey | 5 | 2 | 3 | 7 | 11 | 7 |
| Canada | 5 | 2 | 3 | 9 | 10 | 6 |
| New Zealand | 5 | 0 | 5 | 0 | 15 | 5 |

| | SRB | ENG | CAN | BEL | TUR | NZL |
|---|---|---|---|---|---|---|
| Serbia | | 3–1 | 3–0 | 3–0 | 3–0 | 3–0 |
| England | — | | 3–1 | 3–1 | 3–1 | 3–0 |
| Canada | — | — | | 3–1 | 2–3 | 3–0 |
| Belgium | — | — | — | | 3–0 | 3–0 |
| Turkey | — | — | — | — | | 3–0 |
| New Zealand | — | — | — | — | — | |

==== Group F ====
| Team | Pld | W | L | GW | GL | Pts |
|---|---|---|---|---|---|---|
| Egypt | 5 | 5 | 0 | 15 | 4 | 10 |
| Switzerland | 5 | 4 | 1 | 12 | 9 | 9 |
| Slovakia | 5 | 3 | 2 | 10 | 11 | 8 |
| Lithuania | 5 | 1 | 4 | 11 | 13 | 6 |
| Mexico | 5 | 1 | 4 | 9 | 14 | 6 |
| Italy | 5 | 1 | 4 | 8 | 14 | 6 |

| | SVK | EGY | LTU | ITA | SUI | MEX |
|---|---|---|---|---|---|---|
| Slovakia | | 0–3 | 3–2 | 3–1 | 1–3 | 3–2 |
| Egypt | — | | 3–2 | 3–2 | 3–0 | 3–0 |
| Lithuania | — | — | | 3–1 | 2–3 | 2–3 |
| Italy | — | — | — | | 1–3 | 3–2 |
| Switzerland | — | — | — | — | | 3–2 |
| Mexico | — | — | — | — | — | |

==== Group G ====
| Team | Pld | W | L | GW | GL | Pts |
|---|---|---|---|---|---|---|
| India | 5 | 5 | 0 | 15 | 1 | 10 |
| Croatia | 5 | 4 | 1 | 12 | 6 | 9 |
| Puerto Rico | 5 | 3 | 2 | 12 | 8 | 8 |
| Colombia | 5 | 2 | 3 | 9 | 10 | 7 |
| Portugal | 5 | 1 | 4 | 4 | 12 | 6 |
| Nigeria | 5 | 0 | 5 | 0 | 15 | 5 |

| | CRO | IND | NGA | PUR | COL | POR |
|---|---|---|---|---|---|---|
| Croatia | | 0–3 | 3–0 | 3–2 | 3–1 | 3–0 |
| India | — | | 3–0 | 3–1 | 3–0 | 3–0 |
| Nigeria | — | — | | 0–3 | 0–3 | 0–3 |
| Puerto Rico | — | — | — | | 3–2 | 3–0 |
| Colombia | — | — | — | — | | 3–1 |
| Portugal | — | — | — | — | — | |

==== Group H ====
| Team | Pld | W | L | GW | GL | Pts |
|---|---|---|---|---|---|---|
| Luxembourg | 5 | 5 | 0 | 15 | 1 | 10 |
| Vietnam | 5 | 4 | 1 | 12 | 6 | 8 |
| Slovenia | 5 | 3 | 2 | 10 | 7 | 8 |
| Greece | 5 | 2 | 3 | 8 | 11 | 7 |
| Bulgaria | 5 | 1 | 4 | 6 | 14 | 6 |
| Chile | 5 | 0 | 5 | 3 | 15 | 5 |

| | LUX | SVN | GRE | VIE | CHI | BUL |
|---|---|---|---|---|---|---|
| Luxembourg | | 3–0 | 3–1 | 3–0 | 3–0 | 3–0 |
| Slovenia | — | | 3–0 | 1–3 | 3–1 | 3–0 |
| Greece | — | — | | 1–3 | 3–0 | 3–2 |
| Vietnam | — | — | — | | 3–0 | 3–1 |
| Chile | — | — | — | — | | 2–3 |
| Bulgaria | — | — | — | — | — | |

=== Knockout stage ===
The group winners, as well as the second and third placed teams were drawn. Same for the fourth, fifth and sixth placed teams.

==== Places 37–48 ====
Round of 16
Chile | 3
Canada | 1
Mexico | 3
Nigeria | 0
New Zealand | 0
Bulgaria | 3
Portugal | 0
Italy | 3

Quarterfinals
Turkey | 0
Chile | 3
Mexico | 3
Lithuania | 2
Colombia | 3
Bulgaria | 1
Italy | 1
Greece | 3

Semifinals
Chile | 3
Mexico | 1
Colombia | 1
Greece | 3

Final

==== Places 25–36 ====
Round of 16
Slovakia | 1
Vietnam | 3
England | 2
Puerto Rico | 3
Slovenia | 2
Switzerland | 3
Croatia | 3
Belgium | 0

Quarterfinals
Serbia | 3
Vietnam | 0
Puerto Rico | 1
India | 3
Luxembourg | 3
Switzerland | 0
Croatia | 3
Egypt | 1

Semifinals
Serbia | 2
India | 3
Luxembourg | 3
Croatia | 2

25th place
India | 3
Luxembourg | 1

== Division 3 ==
=== Preliminary round ===
==== Group I ====
| Team | Pld | W | L | GW | GL | Pts |
|---|---|---|---|---|---|---|
| Indonesia | 5 | 4 | 1 | 14 | 6 | 9 |
| Wales | 5 | 3 | 2 | 11 | 7 | 8 |
| Norway | 5 | 3 | 2 | 11 | 10 | 8 |
| Macau | 5 | 3 | 2 | 10 | 9 | 8 |
| Finland | 5 | 2 | 3 | 8 | 13 | 7 |
| Laos | 5 | 0 | 5 | 6 | 15 | 5 |

| | INA | MAC | WAL | FIN | NOR | LAO |
|---|---|---|---|---|---|---|
| Indonesia | | 3–0 | 3–1 | 2–3 | 3–1 | 3–1 |
| Macau | — | | 3–1 | 3–1 | 1–3 | 3–1 |
| Wales | — | — | | 3–0 | 3–1 | 3–0 |
| Finland | — | — | — | | 1–3 | 3–2 |
| Norway | — | — | — | — | | 3–2 |
| Laos | — | — | — | — | — | |

==== Group J ====
| Team | Pld | W | L | GW | GL | Pts |
|---|---|---|---|---|---|---|
| Australia | 5 | 5 | 0 | 15 | 1 | 10 |
| Uzbekistan | 5 | 4 | 1 | 12 | 7 | 9 |
| Estonia | 5 | 2 | 3 | 10 | 12 | 7 |
| Republic of the Congo | 5 | 2 | 3 | 10 | 12 | 7 |
| Nepal | 5 | 1 | 4 | 6 | 13 | 6 |
| Algeria | 5 | 1 | 4 | 5 | 13 | 6 |

| | AUS | UZB | EST | CGO | ALG | NEP |
|---|---|---|---|---|---|---|
| Australia | | 3–0 | 3–1 | 3–0 | 3–0 | 3–0 |
| Uzbekistan | — | | 3–2 | 3–2 | 3–0 | 3–0 |
| Estonia | — | — | | 3–2 | 3–1 | 1–3 |
| Republic of the Congo | — | — | — | | 3–1 | 3–2 |
| Algeria | — | — | — | — | | 3–1 |
| Nepal | — | — | — | — | — | |

==== Group K ====
| Team | Pld | W | L | GW | GL | Pts |
|---|---|---|---|---|---|---|
| Iran | 5 | 5 | 0 | 15 | 0 | 10 |
| Philippines | 5 | 4 | 1 | 12 | 3 | 9 |
| Venezuela | 5 | 3 | 2 | 9 | 6 | 8 |
| Sri Lanka | 5 | 2 | 3 | 6 | 10 | 7 |
| Pakistan | 5 | 1 | 4 | 4 | 12 | 6 |
| Ethiopia | 5 | 0 | 5 | 0 | 15 | 5 |

| | VEN | IRN | PHI | SRI | PAK | ETH |
|---|---|---|---|---|---|---|
| Venezuela | | 0–3 | 0–3 | 3–0 | 3–0 | 3–0 |
| Iran | — | | 3–0 | 3–0 | 3–0 | 3–0 |
| Philippines | — | — | | 3–0 | 3–0 | 3–0 |
| Sri Lanka | — | — | — | | 3–1 | 3–0 |
| Pakistan | — | — | — | — | | 3–0 |
| Ethiopia | — | — | — | — | — | |

==== Group L ====
| Team | Pld | W | L | GW | GL | Pts |
|---|---|---|---|---|---|---|
| Azerbaijan | 5 | 5 | 0 | 15 | 3 | 10 |
| Argentina | 5 | 4 | 1 | 12 | 7 | 9 |
| Kazakhstan | 5 | 3 | 2 | 11 | 8 | 8 |
| Guatemala | 5 | 2 | 3 | 9 | 12 | 7 |
| Latvia | 5 | 1 | 4 | 7 | 13 | 6 |
| Mongolia | 5 | 0 | 5 | 3 | 15 | 5 |

| | ARG | KAZ | GUA | MGL | LAT | AZE |
|---|---|---|---|---|---|---|
| Argentina | | 3–1 | 3–1 | 3–0 | 3–2 | 0–3 |
| Kazakhstan | — | | 3–1 | 3–1 | 3–0 | 1–3 |
| Guatemala | — | — | | 3–1 | 3–2 | 1–3 |
| Mongolia | — | — | — | | 1–3 | 0–3 |
| Latvia | — | — | — | — | | 1–3 |
| Azerbaijan | — | — | — | — | — | |

=== Knockout stage ===
The group winners, the second and third placed teams were drawn. Same for the fourth, fifth and sixth placed teams.

==== Places 61–72 ====
Round of 16
Laos | 1
Latvia | 3
Pakistan | 1
Nepal | 3
Ethiopia | 0
Algeria | 3
Finland | 3
Mongolia | 2

Quarterfinals
Sri Lanka | 3
Latvia | 2
Nepal | 0
Macau | 3
Guatemala | 2
Algeria | 3
Finland | 3
Republic of the Congo | 2

Semifinals
Sri Lanka | 2
Macau | 3
Algeria | 3
Finland | 1

Final

69th place bracket

Semifinals
Laos | 2
Pakistan | 3
Ethiopia | 0
Mongolia | 3

Final

==== Places 49–60 ====
Round of 16
Kazakhstan | 3
Philippines | 2
Uzbekistan | 3
Norway | 2
Estonia | 3
Argentina | 2
Wales | 1
Venezuela | 3

Quarterfinals
Indonesia | 0
Kazakhstan | 3
Uzbekistan | 3
Azerbaijan | 1
Iran | 3
Estonia | 1
Venezuela | 3
Australia | 2

Semifinals
Kazakhstan | 2
Uzbekistan | 3
Iran | 3
Venezuela | 1

49th place
Uzbekistan | 1
Iran | 3

57th place bracket

Semifinals
Philippines | 2
Norway | 3
Argentina | 3
Wales | 2

Final

== Division 4 ==
=== Preliminary round ===
==== Group M ====
| Team | Pld | W | L | GW | GL | Pts |
|---|---|---|---|---|---|---|
| Mauritius | 3 | 2 | 1 | 8 | 5 | 5 |
| Kosovo | 3 | 2 | 1 | 8 | 7 | 5 |
| Lebanon | 3 | 2 | 1 | 7 | 6 | 5 |
| Maldives | 3 | 0 | 3 | 4 | 9 | 3 |

| | MDV | KOS | MRI | LIB |
|---|---|---|---|---|
| Maldives | | 2–3 | 1–3 | 1–3 |
| Kosovo | — | | 3–2 | 2–3 |
| Mauritius | — | — | | 3–1 |
| Lebanon | — | — | — | |

==== Group N ====
| Team | Pld | W | L | GW | GL | Pts |
|---|---|---|---|---|---|---|
| Turkmenistan | 3 | 3 | 0 | 9 | 2 | 6 |
| South Africa | 3 | 2 | 1 | 7 | 4 | 5 |
| Qatar | 3 | 1 | 2 | 5 | 6 | 4 |
| Fiji | 3 | 0 | 3 | 0 | 9 | 3 |

| | RSA | QAT | FIJ | TKM |
|---|---|---|---|---|
| South Africa | | 3–1 | 3–0 | 1–3 |
| Qatar | — | | 3–0 | 1–3 |
| Fiji | — | — | | 0–3 |
| Turkmenistan | — | — | — | |

=== Knockout stage ===
==== Places 73–80 ====
Quarterfinals
Mauritius | 3
Fiji | 1
Lebanon | 3
South Africa | 1
Kosovo | 0
Qatar | 3
Maldives | 0
Turkmenistan | 3

Semifinals
Mauritius | 1
Lebanon | 3
Qatar | 2
Turkmenistan | 3

73rd place
Lebanon | 2
Turkmenistan | 3
75th place
Mauritius | 0
Qatar | 3

77th place bracket

Semifinals
Fiji | 1
South Africa | 3
Kosovo | 3
Maldives | 1

77th place
South Africa | 3
Kosovo | 2
79th place
Fiji | 2
Maldives | 3
