= My Teacher (2017 film) =

- Theatrical release poster
- Directed by: Takahiro Miki
- Written by: Mari Okada
- Based on: Sensei! by Kazune Kawahara
- Produced by: Takashi Hirano
- Starring: Toma Ikuta; Suzu Hirose
- Music by: mio-sotido; Spitz (band)
- Production companies: CBC; Dragonfly Entertainment; Foster Plus Co. GyaO; HBC; J Storm; MBS; RKB; Shueisha; TBS; Tokyu Agency; Warner Bros. Japan
- Distributed by: Warner Bros. Pictures
- Release date: October 28, 2017 (Japan)
- Running time: 113 minutes
- Country: Japan
- Language: Japanese

My Teacher (先生!、、、好きになってもいいですか?, Sensei! ...suki ni natte mo ii desu ka?; "Teacher! ...may I fall in love with you?") is a Japanese romantic drama film directed by Takahiro Miki and based on the manga series of the same name written by Kazune Kawahara.

== Plot ==
Second year high school student and archery enthusiast Hibiki Shimada has never felt romantic love all her life. This comes despite befriending Megumi Chigusa and Kosuke Kawai, two lovestruck teenagers who shamelessly flaunt their feelings for the school's mathematics and visual arts teachers, Masato Sekiya and Sachiko Nakajima, respectively. One day, Hibiki wrongly sends Chigusa's love letter for Sekiya to Kosaku Ito, the school's world history teacher she secretly has a crush on. Volunteering to take it back, she ends up becoming even more attracted to him. Days after their meeting, Hibiki is further fascinated by Ito's kindness, as he is well known among the school as a stern and cold person. Ito takes Hibiki to a hospital when she stumbles in front of his car, helps her finish an assignment after hours, and frequently gives her a ride home. Meanwhile, Chigusa quietly drops her romantic pursuit when she finds out that Sekiya is in love with Nakajima. However, Hibiki and Kosuke learn shortly after that Nakajima is in love with Ito when they overhear her confession to Ito, who rejects her.

Eventually, Hibiki professes her love to Ito before the finals. She suggests a deal to him: if she manages to score over 90 points in the history test, she will take the result as Ito's agreement to fall in love with him. Along the way, Hibiki is discouraged from reaching her goal by Nakajima and Ito himself. She regains her spirit after a pep talk with Yusuke Fujioka, an archery student from a neighboring school. Her efforts bear fruit when the test results are out. During the cultural festival, she approaches Ito in a wedding dress costume and pledges that she will love him forever. Unexpectedly, Ito hugs and then kisses her. The next day, words of the kiss spread among the school. Hibiki is suspended, while Ito is called for disciplinary action. When the two meet later, Ito decides to discourage Hibiki from pursuing a relationship with him even more. Dejectedly walking home, Hibiki is comforted by Fujioka, who confesses his feelings for her.

The result of the disciplinary meeting is announced the next day: Ito will transfer to another school. As she is still suspended, Hibiki does not learn about it until Chigusa hurriedly goes to her home and pleads her to meet with him one last time. Kosuke, angry at Ito's halfheartedness, gives him a tongue lashing about abandoning Hibiki, asking him whether the words he said at the disciplinary meeting — that he takes full responsibility for what has happened and doesn't wish to hurt her any further — were lies. Each encouraged, Hibiki and Ito race for a final meeting, where Ito confesses his love to Hibiki and asks her to wait for him until Hibiki has become of age for them to begin a proper relationship.

Around one and a half year later, Hibiki graduates. Chigusa has found love in an underclassman, while Kosuke is still attempting to woo Nakajima, this time as a graduate and adult. As Hibiki is walking out of the school grounds after the graduation ceremony one last time, she is greeted by Ito. He congratulates her and asks what she wanted to do. She utters the wish to hold hands with him. The final scene shows them holding hands before sharing their first kiss as a couple.

== Cast ==
- Toma Ikuta as Kōsaku Itō
- Suzu Hirose as Hibiki Shimada
- Ryo Ryusei as Kōsuke
- Aoi Morikawa as Megumi Chigusa
- Kentaro as Yūsuke Fujioka
- Tomoya Nakamura as Masato Sekiya
- Manami Higa as Sachiko Nakajima
- Akiko Yagi as Ryoko Shimada
- Leo Morimoto as Akihito Hashiba

== Production ==
Filming took place under November 2016 in the city of Okayama.

The theme song "Uta Usagi" ("Rabbit Song") was provided by Japanese rock band Spitz (スピッツ, Supittsu).

== Reception ==
Internationally, My Teacher got mixed reviews. Critics praise the acting skills of both leads Toma Ikuta and Suzu Hirose, but perceive the depicted pupil-teacher-relationship as problematic.

The original comic book series, which ran from 1996 to 2003, has over 5.7 million printed copies in Japan.

== Trivia ==
Itō sensei's car, with which he frequently gives Hibiki a ride home, is a left-hand drive Fiat Panda.
