= Yui Aragaki =

Japanese actress, model, and singer (born 1988)

- 新垣 結衣
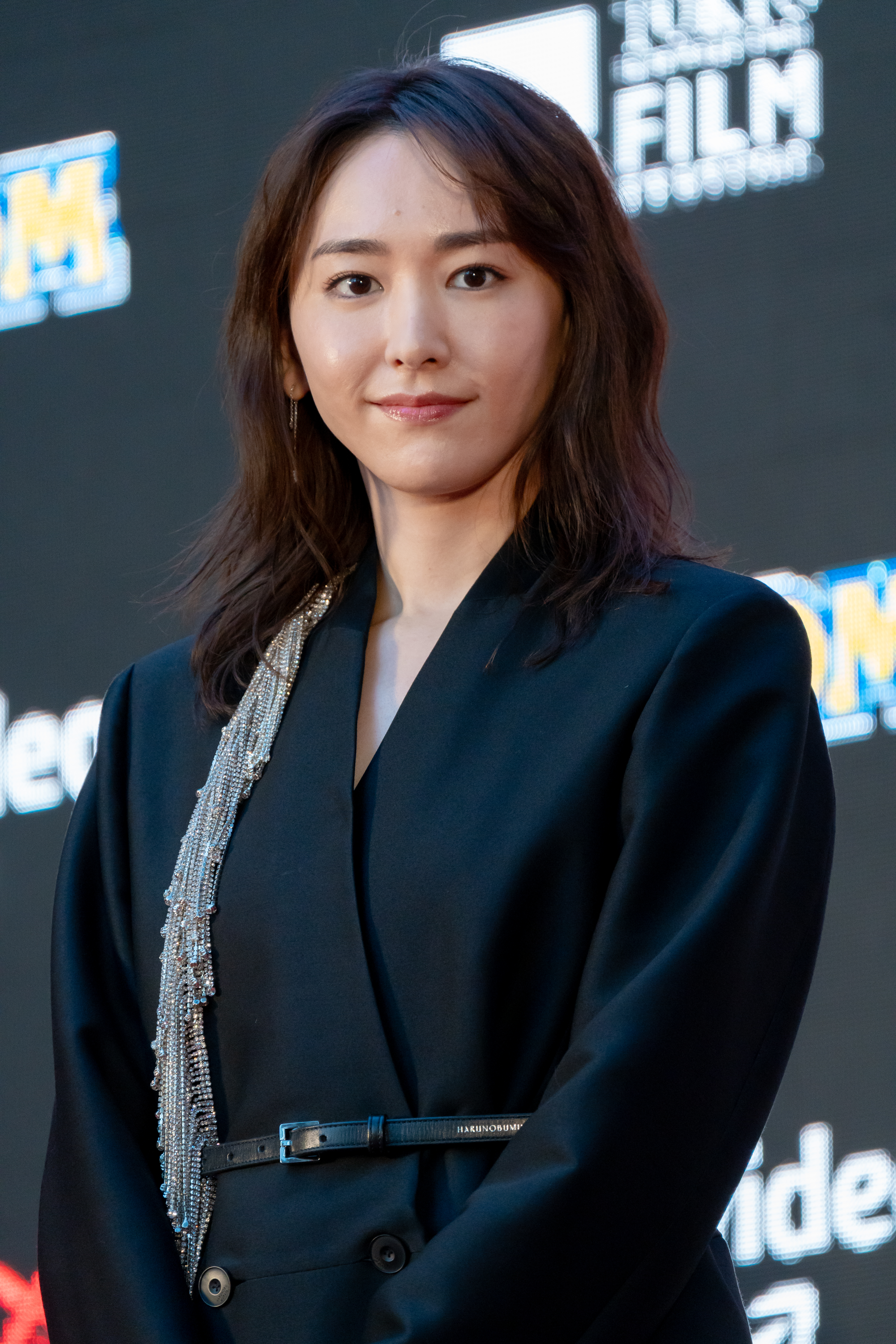
- Aragaki at the 36th Tokyo International Film Festival in October 2023
- Born: June 11, 1988 (age 38); Naha, Okinawa, Japan
- Other name: Gakki
- Occupations: Actress; singer; model
- Years active: 2001–present
- Agent: LesPros Entertainment
- Height: 1.69 m (5 ft 6 1/2 in)
- Spouse: Gen Hoshino (m. 2021)
- Children: 1
- Musical career
- Genres: J-pop; pop rock
- Instrument: Vocals
- Label: Warner Music Japan
- Website: yui-aragaki.lespros.co.jp/profile/

Yui Aragaki (Japanese: 新垣 結衣, Hepburn: Aragaki Yui; born June 11, 1988) is a Japanese actress, model, singer and occasional radio show host. She has been selected several times as the most desired girlfriend and the most desired female celebrity face in Oricon's yearly survey.

== Career ==
Aragaki won the Film prize at the 45th Golden Arrow Awards in 2008. Her tremendous number of movie shoots as well as the preparation for her debut album resulted in her suffering from work-related stress in 2007. She was invited as a judge in 58th NHK Kōhaku Uta Gassen.

Outside acting she also released her first album, Sora, and the single "Heavenly Days", a song from Koizora. "Memories", the theme song for Tokyo Serendipity, was included in her debut album. She also performed at Budokan.

She was also the co-hosts for popular radio program Girls Locks in 2010–2012. She also invited as a host of 54th Japan Record Awards.

In 2012–2013, she acted with Masato Sakai in comedy hit Legal High.

In 2014, she played the role of a mother for the first time in film Twilight Sasarasaya.

In 2016, she acted as Moriyama Mikuri in The Full-Time Wife Escapist She also performed in "koi dance" as ending of the drama, which became viral in Japan. She was invited as a judge again in 67th NHK Kōhaku Uta Gassen.

In 2017, Aragaki Yui acted as Masako Matsushita in Kizuna : hashire kiseki no kouma, also known as Ties: A Miraculous Colt. Broadcast on NHK, the show depicts her character raising ponies after an earthquake with her father. During the same year in July, Code Blue Season 3 that she had participated in has finally released after 7 years broadcasting the second season. In October, Aragaaki Yui played as Tamako Tomita in Mixed Doubles directed by Junichi Ishikawa.

Aragaki Yui won the best actress reward at the 60th Blue Ribbon Awards.

In 2018, Aragaki Yui acted as Shinkai Akira in Kemono ni Narenai Watashitachi (We Can Not Become Beasts, Weakest Beast). She also participated in the Code Blue the Movie, which released in July.

== Personal life ==
In 2021, Aragaki married singer, songwriter and actor Gen Hoshino, her co-star in the television series The Full-Time Wife Escapist. Aragaki and her husband announced in a joint statement on October 13, 2026, that she had given birth to her first child.

== Filmography ==
=== Film ===
Year	Title	Role	Notes	Ref.
2007	Waruboro	Yamada		
2007	Tokyo Serendipity	Yui Aoki	Lead role	
2007	Sky of Love	Mika Tahara	Lead role	
2008	Cheer Cheer Cheer!	Momoko Momoyama	Lead role	
2009	Ballad	Princess Ren		
2010	Hanamizuki	Sae Hirasawa	Lead role	
2012	The Wings of the Kirin	Kaori Nakahara		
2014	Twilight: Saya in Sasara	Saya	Lead role	
2015	Have a Song on Your Lips	Yuri Kashiwagi	Lead role	
2015	S: The Last Policeman - Recovery of Our Future	Hayashi Iruma		
2017	Mixed Doubles	Tamako Tomita	Lead role	
2018	Code Blue	Dr. Megumi Shiraishi		
2022	Yokaipedia	Yōko		
2023	(Ab)normal Desire	Natsuki Kiryu		
2024	Worlds Apart	Makio Kōdai	Lead role	

=== Television dramas ===
Year	Title	Role	Notes	Ref.
2005	Sh15uya	Ema		
2005	Dragon Sakura	Yoshino Kosaka		
2005	Onna no Ichidaiki!	Koshiji Fubuki (child)		
2006	True Love	Aso Natsumi	Lead role	
2006	Kanojo no Koibumi	Yukari Kawamura	Lead role	
2006	Gal Circle	Nagisa		
2006	My Boss My Hero	Umemura Hikari		
2007	Seven Days of a Daddy and a Daughter	Kawahara Kome	Lead role	
2008	Code Blue	Dr. Megumi Shiraishi		
2009	Code Blue Special Episode	Dr. Megumi Shiraishi	Television film	
2009	Smile	Hana Mishima		
2010	Angel Bank	Kaoru Kitashiro	Cameo (episode 1)	
2010	Code Blue 2	Dr. Megumi Shiraishi		
2011	Full Throttle Girl	Ayukawa Wakaba	Lead role	
2011	Ranma ½	Akane Tendo	Lead role; television film	
2012	Mou Yuukai Nante Shinai	Hanazono Erika	Television film	
2012	Legal High	Machiko Mayuzumi		
2013	Public Affairs Office in the Sky	Rika Inaba	Lead role	
2013	Legal High SP	Machiko Mayuzumi	Television film	
2013	Legal High 2	Machiko Mayuzumi		
2014	S: The Last Policeman	Iruma Hayashi		
2015	The Memorandum of Kyoko Okitegami	Kyoko Okitegami	Lead role	
2016	The Full-Time Wife Escapist	Mikuri Moriyama	Lead role	
2017	Ties: A Miraculous Colt	Shoko Matsushita	Miniseries	
2017	Code Blue 3	Dr. Megumi Shiraishi		
2018	Weakest Beast	Shinkai Akira	Lead role	
2020	Daddy is My Classmate	Sachiko Obika		
2021	The Full-Time Wife Escapist: New Year's Special	Mikuri Moriyama	Lead role; television film	
2021	Dragon Sakura season 2	Yoshino Kosaka	Cameo (the final episode)	
2022	The 13 Lords of the Shogun	Yae	Taiga drama	
2023	Kazama Kimichika: Kyojo Zero	Seiko Hayata		
2023	Fence	Kaoru Shiroma	Special appearance	

=== Voice acting ===
Year	Title	Type	Character	Ref.
2006	Digimon Data Squad	Anime series	Yoshino Fujieda	
2006	Digimon World Data Squad	Video game	Yoshino Fujieda	
2006	Keroro Gunsō the Super Movie	Anime film	Mirara	
2024	The Colors Within	Anime film	Sister Hiyoshiko	

=== Documentary ===
Year	Title
2008	News Taiga Special Earth of Life ... Overseas (Australia) Reporter
2008	Yui Aragaki one step at a time-20 years old now-
2010	Special News "Air medical services, Yui Aragaki reports the forefront"
2010	A miracle story seen by the fighting nurse SP "Code Blue”
2010	JOUNETSU – TAIRIKU – Yui Aragaki
2011	Athlete's Soul 2nd "I want to cheer up Japan-Aoi Ishikawa 19-year-old oath"
2015	NHK Special "Life evolution"

== Discography ==
=== Singles ===
Release	Title	Oricon Single charts peak positions and sales				Album
Release	Title	Daily	Weekly	Debut	Overall	Album
2008/07/16	Make My Day	1	2	53,471	85,341	Hug
2008/10/15	Akai Ito	1	3	34,236	64,461	Hug
2009/02/25	Piece	6	7	18,204	25,283	Hug
2009/05/27	Utsushie	9	10	15,946	22,048	Hug

Download Only Single

Release	Title	Artist	Note
2009/12/9	Chiisana Koi no Uta	Yui & a school students group	Yui sing the song with more than 3000 high school students
2010/9/22	Hanamizuki	Yui & SCHOOL OF LOOK! listeners	12 members selected from listeners of "SCHOOL OF LOCK!"

=== Albums ===
Release	Title	Oricon Album charts peak positions and sales			
Release	Title	Daily	Weekly	Debut	Overall
2007/12/05	Sora	2	3	72,879	133,086
2009/06/17	Hug	3	5	22,540	40,704
2010/09/22	Niji	2	4	19,888	29,902

=== Tie-in ===
Year	Title	Tie-in
March 2007	Hi no Kageru Oka	Mitsuya Cider
August 18, 2007	Memory	Tokyo Serendipity
November 3, 2007	heavenly days	Koizora
April 15, 2009	Utsushie	Aishiteru: Kaiyō
April 2009	Heart will drive	Round One Entertainment
May 27, 2009	Hachimitsu	系春の『花Sacas』
October 2009	Chiisana Koi no Uta	Sony Walkman S Series
July 31, 2010	WALK	Hutch the Honeybee: Melody of Couraget

== Awards and nominations ==
Year	Award	Category	Nominated work	Result	Ref.
2007	20th Nikkan Sports Film Awards	Best Newcomer Award	Waruboro and Koizora	Won	
2007	4th TVnavi Drama of the Year	Best Supporting Actress	Seven Days of a Daddy and a Daughter	Won	
2007	17th TV Life Annual Drama Awards	Best Supporting Actress	Seven Days of a Daddy and a Daughter	Won	
2008	32nd Elan d'or Awards	Newcomer of the Year	Herself	Won	
2008	29th Yokohama Film Festival	Best Newcomer Award	Koisuru Madori, Waruboro, and Koizora	Won	
2008	50th Blue Ribbon Awards	Best Newcomer Award	Koisuru Madori, Waruboro, and Koizora	Won	
2008	45th Golden Arrow Awards	Film Prize	Herself	Won	
2008	31st Japan Academy Film Prize	Newcomer of the Year	Koizora	Won	
2008	6th Tokyo Girls Collection	Best Girl of 2007	Herself	Won	
2017	25th Hashida Awards	Best Actress	The Full-Time Wife Escapist	Won	
2017	20th Nikkan Sports Drama Grand Prix	Best Actress	The Full-Time Wife Escapist	Won	
2017	10th Tokyo Drama Awards	Best Actress	The Full-Time Wife Escapist	Won	
2018	60th Blue Ribbon Awards	Best Actress	Mixed Doubles	Won	
2018	41st Japan Academy Film Prize	Best Actress	Mixed Doubles	Nominated	
2024	33rd Japanese Movie Critics Awards	Best Supporting Actress	(Ab)normal Desire	Won	

== Commercials ==
- Daio Paper – Elleair (2003)
- Seika – Meiji (2014 Dec – 2015 Feb)
- Senoby – JT Beverage (2005 Mar – 2006 Feb)
- NTT East (2005 Dec-2013 Dec)
- Pantene – Procter & Gamble (2006–2014)
- Dailies Aqua – Ciba Vision (2006)
- Pocky – Glico (2006–2008)
- Townwork – Recruit (2006–current)
- Japanese Red Cross (2007 January – 2007 December)
- Uniqlo – SKINNY MIX"キャンペーン (2007 February – 2007 April)
- Mitsuya Cider – Asahi Soft Drinks (2007 March -)
- ROHTO Pharmaceutical Co., Ltd. (2008 March – 2010 February 2014 April – Current)
- Green Tea – Asahi Soft Drinks (2009–current)
- Sony Walkman S Series (2009 Oct – 2010 Sep)
- Tokyo Metro – Tokyoheart (2010 Apr – 2011 Mar)
- Haruyama Trading Co., Ltd. – (2010 February – 2012 January)
- Toyota – Ractis (2010 November – 2011 October)
- Meiji – Chocolate Almonds (2011 April – current)
- Meiji – Meltykiss (2011 October – current)
- DeNA – Mobage (2011 November – 2012 October)
- KOSÉ- Sekkisei (2012 July -current)
- DeNA – Final Fantasy (2012 July- 2012 October)
- Canon – EOS (Mirrorless single-lens camera) (2012 July – 2014 July)
- Canon – IXY PowerShot (Compact digital camera) (2013 February- 2014 February)
- Canon – EOS kiss X7 (Single-lens reflex camera) (2013 November- 2014 February)
- KOSÉ- ESPRIQUE (2014 November – 2015 February)
- GMO CLICK Securities, Inc -(2015 January – Current)
- Meiji – Valentine Special (2016 February)
- Uniqlo (2017)
- NIPPON PAPER CRECIA Co., Ltd. – Kleenex (2017 April – current)
- Uniqlo – ドレープコレクション (2017 March – Current)
- Toyota – Noah (2017 July – Current)
- H&M – (2021)
- Nintendo – (2022)

== Official photobooks ==
- Chura Chura (2006)
- A Happy New Gakky (2006)
- Masshiro (2007)
- Koisuru Madori (2007)
- Gekkan Yui Aragaki Special (2010)
- Hanamizuki Official Photostory Book (2010)

=== Calendar ===
- Aragaki Yui Official 2005 Calendar (Release on December 10, 2004: Triax (Hagoromo))
- Aragaki Yui Official 2006 Calendar (Release on November 7, 2005: Triax (Hagoromo))
- Aragaki Yui Official 2007 Calendar (Release on November 4, 2006: Triax (Hagoromo))
- Aragaki Yui Official 2008 Calendar (Release on October 22, 2007: Triax (Hagoromo))
- Aragaki Yui Official 2009 Calendar (Release on October 27, 2008: Triax (Hagoromo))
- Aragaki Yui Official 2010 Calendar (Release on October 28, 2009: Triax (Hagoromo))
- Aragaki Yui Official 2011 Calendar (Release on October 13, 2010: LesPro)
- Aragaki Yui Official 2012 Calendar (Release on October 26, 2011: LesPro)
- Aragaki Yui Official 2013 Calendar (Release on October 6, 2012: LesPro)
- Aragaki Yui Official 2014 Calendar (Release on November 2, 2013: LesPro)
- Aragaki Yui Official 2015 Calendar (Release on November 8, 2014: LesPro)
- Aragaki Yui Official 2016 Calendar (Release on November 7, 2015: LesPro)
- Aragaki Yui Official 2017 Calendar (Release on November 12, 2016: LesPro)
- Aragaki Yui Official 2018 Calendar (Release on September 1, 2017: LesPro)
