= Sora (album) =

Studio album by Yui Aragaki
- Released: December 5, 2007
- Recorded: 2007
- Genre: Pop
- Length: 43:11
- Label: Warner Music Japan

Yui Aragaki chronology
| Sora (2007) | Hug (2009) |

Alternative covers
- Limited edition cover

Sora (そら "Sky") is Japanese recording artist Yui Aragaki's debut album. It was released on December 5, 2007.

== Background ==
The album includes the theme song to the film Koizora, which stars Aragaki herself. It was released in two formats: CD+DVD standard edition and a limited edition which has an illustration cover drawn by Aragaki herself and comes priced at 1,890 yen. The standard edition DVD includes the music video and making of footage of "Heavenly Days".

== Chart performance ==
Sora debuted on the daily Oricon albums chart at #2 with 11,499 copies sold. It peaked at #3 on the weekly charts with 72,879 copies sold, making Aragaki the first actress-turned-singer in four years (since Kou Shibasaki) to have her debut album open in the top 3. Sora was the 10th best selling album for the month of December 2007. It was 160th (2007) and 167th (2008) on the yearly Oricon albums chart.

== Track listing ==
CD
| No. | Title | Lyrics | Music | Length |
|---|---|---|---|---|
| 1. | "Heavenly Days" | Yōichi Niibara | Kenji Kubo | 4:33 |
| 2. | "Orenji" (オレンジ "Orange") | Kenji Watanabe | Watanabe | 3:31 |
| 3. | "Hi no Kageru Oka" (陽のかげる丘 "The Hill Darkened by the Sun") | Yūko Andō | Andō | 5:11 |
| 4. | "Memorīzu" (メモリーズ "Memories") | Ayano Tsuji | Tsuji | 4:25 |
| 5. | "Hikari" (ひかり "Light") | Yui Aragaki | Yōko Kuzuya | 5:49 |
| 6. | "Sign of the Moon (Interlude)" | | Keita Takahashi | 1:57 |
| 7. | "Sutāraito" (スターライト "Starlight") | Mito | Mito | 3:55 |
| 8. | "Pea Ringu" (ペアリング "Pair Ring") | Tōko Furuuchi | Furuuchi | 4:56 |
| 9. | "Ai wo Shiritakute" (愛を知りたくて "I Want to Know Love") | Tsuji | Tsuji | 4:06 |
| 10. | "Sora" (そら "Sky") | Aragaki | H Zett M | 4:48 |
| Total length: | | | | 43:11 |

DVD
| No. | Title | Length |
|---|---|---|
| 1. | "Heavenly Days" (Music Video) |
| 2. | "Heavenly Days" (Making of) |

== Charts, sales and certifications ==
=== Chart positions ===
| Chart (2007–2008) | Peak positions |
|---|---|
| Japan Oricon Daily Albums Chart | 2 |
| Japan Oricon Weekly Albums Chart | 3 |
| Japan Oricon Monthly Albums Chart | 10 |
| Japan Oricon Yearly Albums Chart (2007) | 160 |
| Japan Oricon Yearly Albums Chart (2008) | 167 |
| Japan SoundScan Albums Chart (CD+DVD) | 4 |
| Japan SoundScan Albums Chart (CD) | 7 |
| Taiwan Five Music J-pop/K-pop Chart | 2 |
| Taiwan G-Music Combo Chart | 8 |
| Taiwan G-Music J-pop Chart | 1 |
| Taiwan G-Music International Chart | 3 |

=== Sales and certifications ===
| Country | Provider | Sales | Certification (sales thresholds) |
|---|---|---|---|
| Japan | RIAJ | 133,086 | Gold |

== Release history ==
| Region | Date | Label | Format |
|---|---|---|---|
| Japan | December 5, 2007 | Warner Music | CD (Limited Edition) |
| Japan | December 5, 2007 | Warner Music | CD+DVD (Standard Edition) |
| Taiwan | January 30, 2008 | Warner Music | CD+DVD |
| Hong Kong | February 26, 2008 | Warner Music | CD+DVD |
