= Piece (song) =

Single by Yui Aragaki

from the album Hug
- Released: February 25, 2009
- Recorded: 2008
- Genre: Pop
- Length: 20:09
- Label: Warner Music Japan
- Songwriter(s): Minako Kawae

Yui Aragaki singles chronology
"Akai Ito" (2008)	"Piece" (2009)	"Utsushie" (2009)

Alternative covers
- Limited edition A cover

Alternative cover
- Limited edition B cover

"Piece" is a pop song by Japanese recording artist Yui Aragaki. It was released as her third single on February 25, 2009.

== Background ==
"Piece" was written and composed by singer-songwriter Minako Kawae. The song first premiered on Aragaki's Tokyo FM radio show, "School of Lock!", January 21, 2009. The single features a cover of Mongol800's hit song "Anata ni" and "Sparkle", written by Aragaki herself.

"Piece" was released in three formats: standard edition, limited edition A, which has an illustration cover drawn by Aragaki herself and limited edition B, which has an illustration cover drawn by Studio Ghibli animator Yoshiyuki Momose, who also directed an animated music video for the song.

== Chart performance ==
"Piece" peaked at #6 on the daily Oricon singles chart and #7 on the weekly chart, selling 18,204 copies in its first week.

== Track listing ==
No.	Title	Lyrics	Music	Length
1.	"Piece"	Minako Kawae	Kawae	4:25
2.	"Supākuru" (スパークル "Sparkle")	Yui Aragaki	Yoshihiko Chino	4:13
3.	"Anata ni" (あなたに "To You")	Kiyosaku Uezu	Mongol800	4:18
4.	"Piece (Naked Voice Version)"	Kawae	Kawae	2:50
5.	"Piece (Instrumental)"		Kawae	4:23
Total length:				20:09

== Charts and sales ==
Chart (2009)	Peak positions	Sales
Billboard Japan Hot 100	6	25,283
Japan Oricon Daily Singles Chart	6	25,283
Japan Oricon Weekly Singles Chart	7	25,283
Japan SoundScan Singles Chart (Edition A)	14	25,283
Japan SoundScan Singles Chart (Standard Edition)	20	25,283

== Release history ==
Region	Date	Label	Format
Japan	February 25, 2009	Warner Music Japan	CD (Limited Edition A)
Japan	February 25, 2009	Warner Music Japan	CD (Limited Edition B)
Japan	February 25, 2009	Warner Music Japan	CD (Standard Edition)
