= Hong Kong Open (table tennis) =

Tournament information
- Tour: ITTF World Tour
- Founded: 2018
- Location: Hong Kong
- Venue: Queen Elizabeth Stadium
- Category: World Tour
- Draw: 32S / 16D
- Prize money: US$145,000

The Hong Kong Open is a table tennis event held for the first time in 2018, as part of the 2018 ITTF World Tour. The event is organised by the Hong Kong Table Tennis Association, under the authority of the International Table Tennis Federation (ITTF).

== Champions ==
Year	Location	Men's singles	Women's singles	Men's doubles	Women's doubles	Mixed doubles	Ref.
2018	Hong Kong	(Japan) Kazuhiro Yoshimura	(China) Wang Manyu	(Hong Kong) Ho Kwan Kit (Hong Kong) Wong Chun Ting	(China) Chen Xingtong (China) Sun Yingsha	NOT HELD	
2019	Hong Kong	(China) Lin Gaoyuan	(China) Wang Yidi	(China) Liang Jingkun (China) Lin Gaoyuan	(China) Chen Ke (China) Mu Zi	(Chinese Taipei) Lin Yun-ju (Chinese Taipei) Cheng I-ching	

== See also ==
- Asian Table Tennis Union
