= Make My Day (Yui Aragaki song) =

- Limited edition A cover

Single by Yui Aragaki

from the album Hug
- Released: July 16, 2008
- Recorded: 2008
- Genre: Pop
- Length: 18:42
- Label: Warner Music Japan
- Songwriter: Keito Blow
- Producer: Keito Blow

Yui Aragaki singles chronology
"Make My Day" (2008)	"Akai Ito" (2008)

Audio sample
- file; help

Alternative covers
- Limited edition B cover

Alternative cover
- Limited edition C cover

"Make My Day" is a pop song by Japanese recording artist Yui Aragaki. It was released as her first single on July 16, 2008.

== Background and composition ==
"Make My Day" is a pop-rock song written and produced by Japanese singer-songwriter Keito Blow. It was released in three limited editions: edition A, which has an illustration cover drawn by Aragaki herself, edition B, which comes with a DVD including three live performances and edition C, which comes with a DVD including three music videos and off-shot footage.

Aragaki gave Blow a list of themes she wanted her music to reflect and Blow used it as inspiration to write the song, as well as the b-side "I Believe". The second b-side, "Soba ni", was written by Aragaki herself and talks about the many things one can notice in a Shibuya crowd.

"Make My Day" was used as theme song for the Fuji TV drama 81diver, starring Junpei Mizobata and Riisa Naka.

== Chart performance ==
"Make My Day" debuted on the daily Oricon singles chart at #1 with 11,499 copies sold. It peaked at #2 on the weekly charts with 53,471 copies sold. The song debuted at #1 on the Billboard Japan Hot 100 chart "Make My Day" was the 12th best selling single for the month of July and 88th best selling single of the year.

== Track listing ==
CD
No.	Title	Lyrics	Music	Length
1.	"Make My Day"	Keito Blow	Blow	3:48
2.	"Soba ni" (ソバニ "Beside")	Yui Aragaki	Shigekazu Aida	4:28
3.	"I Believe"	Blow	Blow	5:07
4.	"Make My Days (Naked Voice Version)"	Blow	Blow	1:34
5.	"Make My Days"		Blow	3:45
Total length:				18:42

DVD (Edition B)
No.	Title	Length
1.	"Orenji (2007/12/21 Live Version)" (オレンジ "Orange")
2.	"Heavenly Days (2007/12/21 Live Version)"
3.	"Sora (2007/12/21 Live Version)" (そら "Sky")

DVD (Edition C)
No.	Title	Length
1.	"Make My Day" (Music video)
2.	"Make My Day (Naked Voice Version)" (Music video)
3.	"Heavenly Days (Naked Voice Version)" (Music video)
4.	"Make My Day" (Music video off-shot + Yui Aragaki: Hatachi ni Natte)

== Charts, sales and certification ==
=== Chart positions ===
Chart (2008)	Peak positions
Japan Hot 100 (Billboard)	1
Japan Billboard Top Airplay	56
Japan Oricon Daily Singles Chart	1
Japan Oricon Weekly Singles Chart	2
Japan Oricon Monthly Singles Chart	12
Japan Oricon Yearly Singles Chart	88
Japan SoundScan Singles Chart (Edition A)	7
Japan SoundScan Singles Chart (Edition B)	8
Japan SoundScan Singles Chart (Edition C)	2

=== Sales and certification ===
Country	Provider	Sales	Certification (sales thresholds)
Japan	RIAJ	85,341	Gold

== Release history ==
Region	Date	Label	Format
Japan	July 16, 2008	Warner Music Japan	CD (Limited Edition A)
Japan	July 16, 2008	Warner Music Japan	CD+DVD (Limited Edition B)
Japan	July 16, 2008	Warner Music Japan	CD+DVD (Limited Edition C)
