= Hanamizuki =

- Poster
- Directed by: Nobuhiro Doi
- Written by: Noriko Yoshida
- Produced by: Yasuo Yagi; Kazuya Hamana; Jun Nasuda
- Starring: Yui Aragaki; Toma Ikuta
- Cinematography: Yasushi Sasakibara
- Distributed by: Toho
- Release date: 21 August 2010 (Japan)
- Running time: 128 minutes
- Country: Japan
- Language: Japanese
- Budget: $5.5 million
- Box office: $33.02 million

Hanamizuki (Japanese: ハナミズキ, Hepburn: Hanamizuki) is a 2010 Japanese romance drama film inspired by the lyrics of a love song of the same name by Yo Hitoto. The film is directed by Nobuhiro Doi, and its script was written by Noriko Yoshida. The film spans the ten-year period from 1996 to 2006, and it stars Yui Aragaki as Sae, a high school student who later grows into a young adult. Toma Ikuta also stars in this film, playing the role of Kouhei, Sae's boyfriend and an aspiring fisherman.

When they were both in high school and happened to run into each other on a train, a romance begins. Later, when Sae needs to leave Hokkaido to go to Tokyo for studies, the two of them attempted to have a long-distance relationship. However, their bond is tested by multiple challenges facing the two of them.

Hanamizuki was first released in Japanese cinemas on 21 August 2010. It subsequently made its international debut at the 30th Hawaii International Film Festival. The film received a mixed-to-positive reception from critics, and grossed $33.01 million, making it the 12th highest-grossing Japanese film of 2010.

== Plot ==
This film spans the years of 1996 to 2006.

It begins in the year 2005 when Sae is traveling to her birthplace of Peggys Cove, Nova Scotia in Canada. On the bus, she looks at a photo, and the scene immediately goes back to 1996. Sae and Kouhei met on a train ride to their respective college entrance examinations. The train hit a deer, causing Sae to worry about being late for the examinations. They went to a nearby house to ask if the owners could give them a lift. Sae spotted a key in the truck parked at the porch. She asked Kouhei if he would "borrow" the truck to take her to the exam center. However, when Kouhei tried to overtake a slow cow truck, he narrowly avoided an incoming crane, and went off the road into a ditch. They were brought to a police station and Sae was disqualified from her examinations.

Sae worked hard to get into a university while Kouhei always supported her. However, he had mixed feelings about her going to Tokyo, because that would mean that they would be separated. Hence, when Sae managed to get into Waseda University, Kouhei at first refused to see her off. However, at his friends' urging, they got onto a boat and chased after Sae, and when they saw her, they rolled out a banner reading, "Good Luck Sae!".

At Waseda University, Sae met Kitami Junichi, a senior who likes taking pictures of children in third world countries. He helps Sae find a night job teaching English at a cram school and became good friends with her. When Kouhei visited Sae in Tokyo, upon seeing Sae and Kitami talking together, Kouhei got jealous. During the dinner date with Sae, Kouhei refused to eat anything and stormed out of the restaurant. On his way, a group of delinquent youths knocked down a box that contained Kouhei's present for Sae, and mocked him. A fight ensured, and Kouhei was injured. Sae brought Kouhei back to her apartment, where they made up. Kouhei then gives Sae the ship, which was similar to the one Kouhei was on when he saw off Sae. Sae worries that their relationship will not last very long.

Four years later, a graduating Sae is unable to find a job in Tokyo. She met Junichi, who asks her to go to New York City together with him. Kouhei was also told by his father that their fishing boat was about to be repossessed by the bank, and he must find another job. Kouhei then contacts Sae, telling her that he plans to go to Tokyo to find her. However, on the fishing boat's last trip, Kouhei's father had a heart attack and died. Kouhei is then unable to leave for Tokyo, as he had to take care of his mother and younger sister.

Later, Sae leaves for New York and meets up with Junichi, and they worked together in the same company. Junichi proposed to Sae later on. Sae returned to Kushiro to attend her friend Minami's wedding, and she found out that Kouhei was married to Ritsuko. However, Ritsuko was jealous of the way Sae and her husband were interacting. Kouhei then met Sae at the lighthouse, and Sae tells him that this might be the last time she visits Japan since she may get married. Having seen each other after such a long time, they can't resist anymore and they embrace each other passionately in front of Sae's house while dropping her off, but their responsibilities towards their better halves (in her case, her fiancé) force them to reluctantly part ways. When Kouhei returned, he found Ritsuko waiting for him on the steps with bad news - the bank might make them bankrupt. Kouhei manages to settle the problem, but he found Ritsuko's divorce papers on the table when he returned. The scene ends with a news report stating that Junichi was killed in Iraq.

2 years later, Sae visits her hometown in Canada. When she was walking, she chanced upon the ship that Kouhei had given her in a shop window and found out that Kouhei was part of a ship's crew that had docked in port. She rushed to see Kouhei, but just missed him.

In 2006, Sae has moved back to Japan, and set up a school for children in her house. The film ends when Sae sees Kouhei under the flowering dogwood tree, and Sae welcomes Kouhei back home.

After the credits there is a cutscene with a little girl, looking at that same tree Sae always was. Her father comes in behind her and lifts her up. If you look close enough, you can see the child's father is Kouhei. Putting the pieces together: Sae and Kouhei get married and have a daughter, they live in Sae's childhood home.

== Cast ==
- Yui Aragaki as Sae Hirasawa. This will be Aragaki's last high school character, though she will be playing the role of a career women later in the film. She had also undergone special language training to cope with the English lines in this film. Sae is a Hokkaido high school student who lives with her mother and dreams of attending a Tokyo university in the beginning of the film. She met Kouhei on a train ride, and slowly their relationship blossomed. Sae's childhood was played by Runa Matsumoto.
- Toma Ikuta as Kouhei Kiuchi, the only son of a fisherman who dreams of following in his father's footsteps one day. When he first saw Sae, he immediately fell in love with her. He was later married Ritsuko, but was divorced from her a little later due to a falling out.
- Osamu Mukai as Junichi Kitami, a photographer who loves to go around the world taking pictures of children in war zones. He and Sae met at Waseda University, where Kitami was her senior. He proposed to Sae, but was killed by a terrorist attack in Iraq before their wedding.
- Hiroko Yakushimaru as Ryoko, Sae's mother. She worked as a nurse during the day and worked at a Karaoke Lounge as a hostess during the night to support Sae. She was widowed when her husband died because of cancer.
- Misako Renbutsu as Ritsuko Watanabe, Kouhei's wife. She liked Kouhei since she saw him working at the docks where she works as an accountant. She later married him, but divorced him and ran away. She later became a cashier at a supermarket.
- Arata as Kemimichi, Sae's father. He is an avid photographer, and frequently leaves Sae and her mom alone. He planted the Dogwood tree in Sae's house garden.
- Yuichi Kimura as Makato Endo, Sae's neighbor and her mother's friend. He owned a ranch.
- Yutaka Matsushige
- Eri Tokunaga as Minami Nakamura, Sae's best friend in high school. She later married one of Kouhei's friends.
- Yuta Kanai
- Yu Koyanagi
- Tsutomu Takahashi
- Mamatsu Hayashi is playing the role of Kouhei's younger sister.
- Kaori Mizushima

== Production ==
=== Development ===
The plot of the film is based on the song Hanamizuki, a song by Yo Hitoto released in 2004. This popular song got to 4th in the Oricon charts.

=== Casting ===
The film was directed by the director Nobuhiro Do, whose previous works included the film Nada Soso.

=== Filming ===
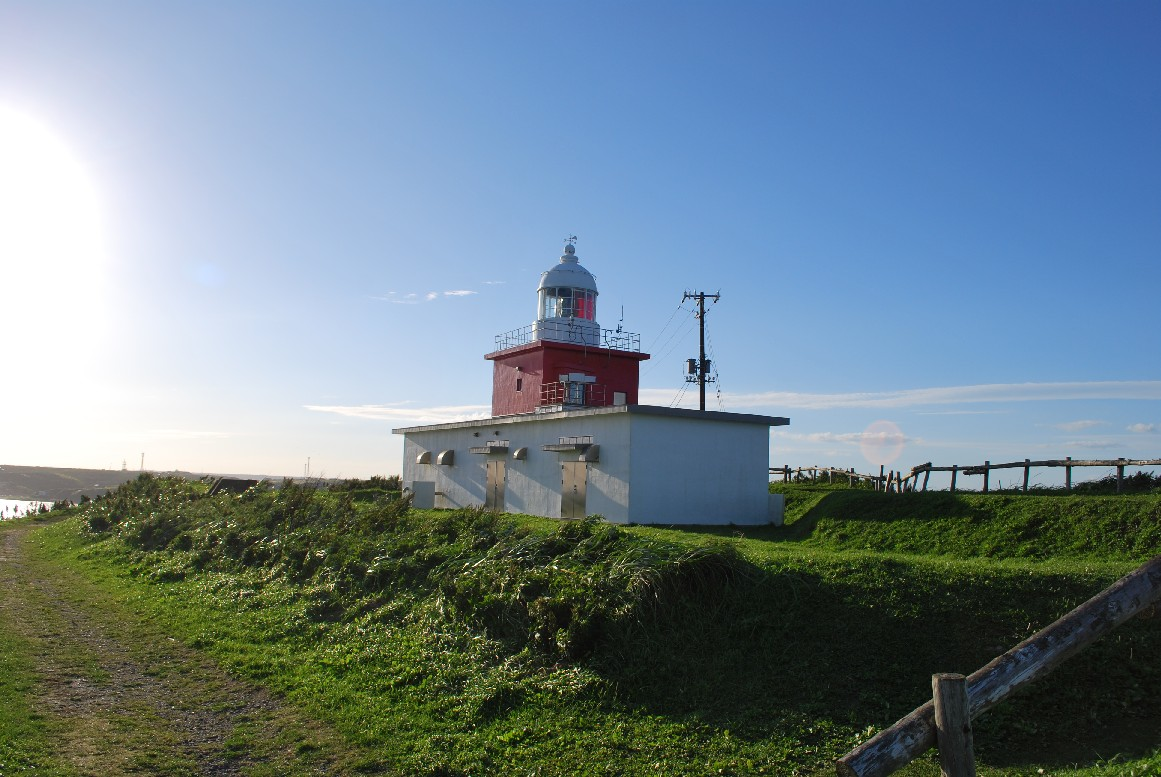
Yuhutsumisaki Lighthouse, Kushiro, Hokkaido

In Japan, it was filmed in Waseda University in Tokyo and in the Shinjuku district, which is also in Tokyo. Next, the filming moved to Kushiro, Hokkaido in September 2009, completing the filming in Japan itself.

Hanamizuki was also filmed in America and Canada. In New York, it was filmed at the Empire State Building, Brooklyn Heights Promenade and Union Square. The last stop of their filming was at Nova Scotia's Peggy's Cove Lighthouse. On 23 April 2010, Yui Aragaki and Toma Ikuta was greeted at their filming site there. Aragaki described this filming location as "quite distant (except for the scene at sea)" and added that "Luckily, there have not been a major accident during the filming." Hanamizuki director Nobuhiro Doi said that after completing the filming across three countries, he felt "nothing but relief" and thanked the cast for having gone through the long journey with him.

=== Theme song ===
The film's theme song was "Hanamizuki" (ハナミズキ, Hanamizuki), which was sung by Yo Hitoto and on which this film was based on.

== Soundtrack ==
Hanamizuki Original Soundtrack

Soundtrack album by Takefumi Haketa
- Released: 10 August 2010
- Length: 41 minutes
- Label: Columbia Music Entertainment (COCP-36327)

The soundtrack for this film was released before the film on 10 August 2010.

Track list:

1. "Hanamizuki -Introduction-" (ハナミズキ -Introduction-)
2. "Opening Title"
3. "Jig for the Fiddle #1"
4. "Lighthouse on the Hill -Main Theme-"
5. "Jig for the Fiddle #2"
6. "Under the Dogwood Tree" (ハナミズキの下で, Hanamizuki no shita de)
7. "New York"
8. "Sprouting" (芽生え, Mebae)
9. "The Two People in the Snow" (雪の中のふたり, Yuki no naka no futari)
10. "Irish Reel"
11. "The Start of Love" (恋の始まり, Koi no hajimari)
12. "Fiddle and Guitar -Main Theme-"
13. "Kitami's Proposal" (北見のプロポーズ, Kitami no puropōzu)
14. "The Two Mornings" (ふたりの朝, Futari no asa)
15. "Bad News" (悪い知らせ, Warui shirase)
16. "Death of My Father" (親父の死, Oyaji no shi)
17. "The Two Thoughts" (ふたりの想い, Futari no omoi)
18. "Under the Dogwood Tree -reprise-" (ハナミズキの下で -reprise-, Hanamizuki no shita de -reprise-)
19. "Sadness" (悲しみ, Kanashimi)
20. Lighthouse on the Hill -reprise-
21. "Under the Dogwood Tree -Piano Solo-" (ハナミズキの下で -Piano Solo-, Hanamizuki no shita de -Piano Solo-)

== Release ==
Hanamizuki was first released in Japan nationwide on 21 August 2010. Next, it debuted in Thailand under the Thai name title ฮานามิซึกิ เกิดมาเพื่อรักเธอ on 23 December 2010. In Taiwan, Hanamizuki was released on 1 January 2011. In Hong Kong, Hanamizuki was released under the Chinese name of "花水木" on 9 April 2011.

Hanamizuki was also screened at the 30th Hawaii International Film Festival under the category of "Spotlight on Japan" in 2010, marking its international debut.

=== Home media ===
The Hanamizuki home video was released on 4 March 2011. It was released in three different versions: DVD (region 2) normal edition, DVD (region 2) special 2-disc edition and in Blu-ray format.

== Reception ==
=== Box office ===
Hanamizuki debuted on 310 cinema screens around Japan, where it became the highest-grossing film on the weekend of 21–22 August 2010 with a record gross of over ¥400 million, and at the same time breaking Studio Ghibli's film The Secret World of Arrietty four consecutive week hold on the top position in the Japanese box office. During this weekend, over 301,000 people went to watch this film. Hanamizuki managed to cling on to its top position for two consecutive weekends, managing to break the 1-billion-yen mark and having over 1 million viewers during the weekend. The Motion Picture Producers Association of Japan put its domestic gross at ¥2.83 billion, making it the 12th highest-grossing Japanese film of 2010. In US dollars, Hanamizuki grossed $32,891,241 in Japanese cinemas.

In Thailand, Hanamizuki debuted at the ninth position on its debut weekend. It was screened there for two weekends, garnering a total gross of $22,782. Hanamizuki managed to achieve the 10th position on its Taiwanese debut weekend of January 1–2. Over its run of three weeks, it grossed a total of $56,268 in Taiwanese cinemas, making it the second-highest-grossing territory after Japan. The film ended its box office run with a total worldwide gross of $33,016,351.

=== Critical reception ===
Before the film release, Asahi Shimbun wrote in an article that Hanamizuki was a "modest masterpiece of the Yō Hitoto's work", and that it makes the audience want to cry. The article ended by saying, "Now to see more and more."

Derek Elley, reviewing for Film Business Asia, criticized the screenplay of the film saying that it was "the weakest element in Hanamizuki". He did, however, praised actress Yakushimaru Hiroko, calling it "the best performance (in the film)". Overall, the reviewer concluded that the film is a "workmanlike story better suited to afternoon TV." and gave the film a rating of 5 out of 10.

=== Accolades ===
Year	Award	Category	Result	Recipient
2010	32nd Yokohama Film Festival	Best Newcomer Award	Won	Osamu Mukai; Also for his role in BECK
2010	53rd Blue Ribbon Awards	Best Newcomer Award	Won	Toma Ikuta; Also for his role in Ningen Shikkaku

== Merchandise ==
=== Illustrated book ===
The book The Three Little Pigs, which was used as a prop in the film and it was used in the scene where Sae when she taught her young students English, was put up for sale as one of the film's publicity move. The book was illustrated by Yui Aragaki, and includes a CD containing the narration of the story in Japanese with Aragaki as one of the narrators. The book was published by mpi and was released on 25 June 2010, before the release of the actual film.

=== Film manga ===
A manga version of Hanamizuki was published by Shueisha in Japan. It was released in a tankōbon volume on 15 February 2011.

==== Volume list ====
No.	Original release date	Original ISBN	English release date	English ISBN
1	15 February 2011	978-4088671031	-	—
