= Yui Hamamoto =

Japanese table tennis player

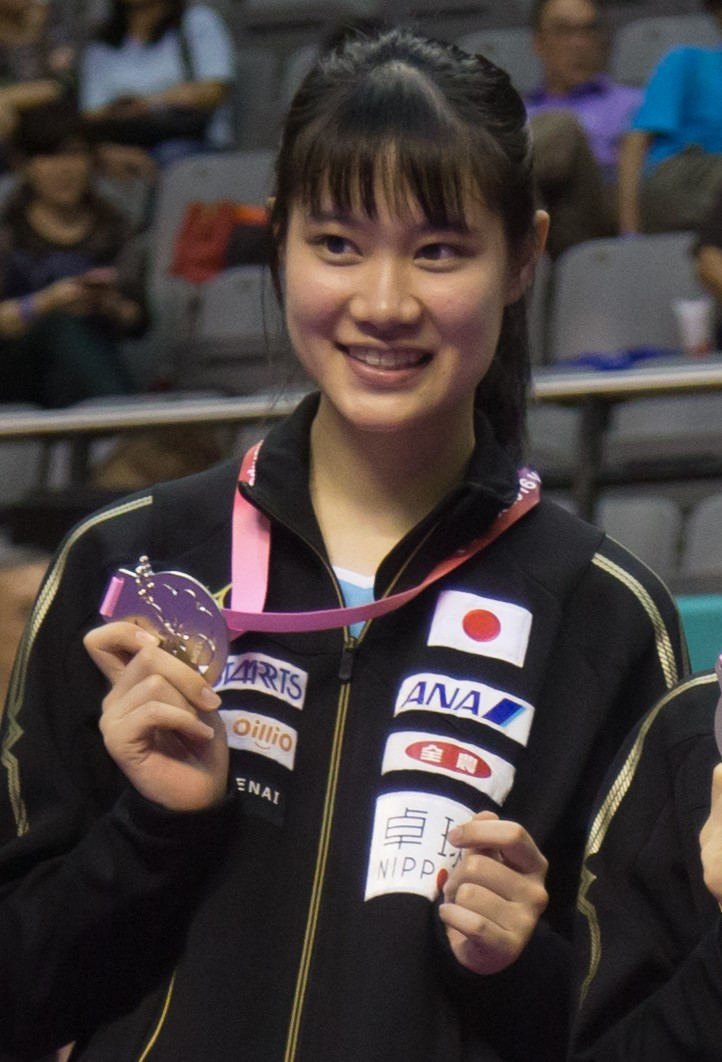
- Hamamoto at the 2016 World Team Table Tennis Championships

Personal information
- Born: 28 July 1998 (age 27) Osaka, Japan
- Height: 174 cm (5 ft 9 in)

Sport
- Sport: Table tennis
- Club: Kinoshita Abyell Kanagawa
- Playing style: Right-handed shakehand grip
- Highest ranking: 16 (February 2017)
Medal record
Representing Japan
World Championships
Silver medal – second place	2016 Selangor	Team

Yui Hamamoto (浜本 由惟, Hamamoto Yui; born July 28, 1998) is a Japanese table tennis player. Her father is Japanese, while her mother is a Chinese table tennis player.

At the age of 18, she made the national team, which won a silver medal at the 2016 World Team Table Tennis Championships. She also won gold at the women's doubles at the 2016 ITTF World Tour Grand Finals with Hina Hayata.

== Association change ==
In 2019, Hamamoto registered with the Austrian Table Tennis Association in hopes of acquiring Austrian nationality. According to her family, she did so in order to continue playing internationally, as making the Japanese national team again had been difficult for her.

== In popular culture ==
Hamamoto appeared in the 2017 film Mixed Doubles.
