= Merengue (band) =

Japanese rock band

Merengue is a Japanese rock band licensed by Warner Music Japan. The band was created in 2002 by Kenji Kubo. In 2003, Takeshi Yamazaki and Tsuyoshi Takeshita joined the band. In 2013, they signed to Ki/oon Music and performed the Sixth Opening of Space Brothers.

== Members ==
- Kenji Kubo (クボケンジ Kubo Kenji) is in charge of vocals, guitar, and the synthesizer.
- Takeshi Yamazaki (ヤマザキタケシ Yamazaki Takeshi) is the drummer.
- Tsuyoshi Takeshita (タケシタツヨシ Takeshita Tsuyoshi) is the bassist.

== Discography ==
Merengue singles
Title	Year	Peak Oricon
"About Us"	2014	39

Merengue albums
Title	Year	Peak Oricon
Symmetry	2009	40
Aporia	2011	47
Music Scene	2012	31
Campfire	2014	46
