= Sport in Jersey =

In its own right Jersey participates in the Commonwealth Games and in the bi-annual Island Games, which it last hosted in 2015. Jersey is a founder member of the Island Games Association and has participated in every Games since the first in 1985. Jersey first competed in 1958 in the British Empire and Commonwealth Games and has since participated in every staging of what became the Commonwealth Games. Youth sports participation includes the Commonwealth Youth Games and Jeux des Isles.

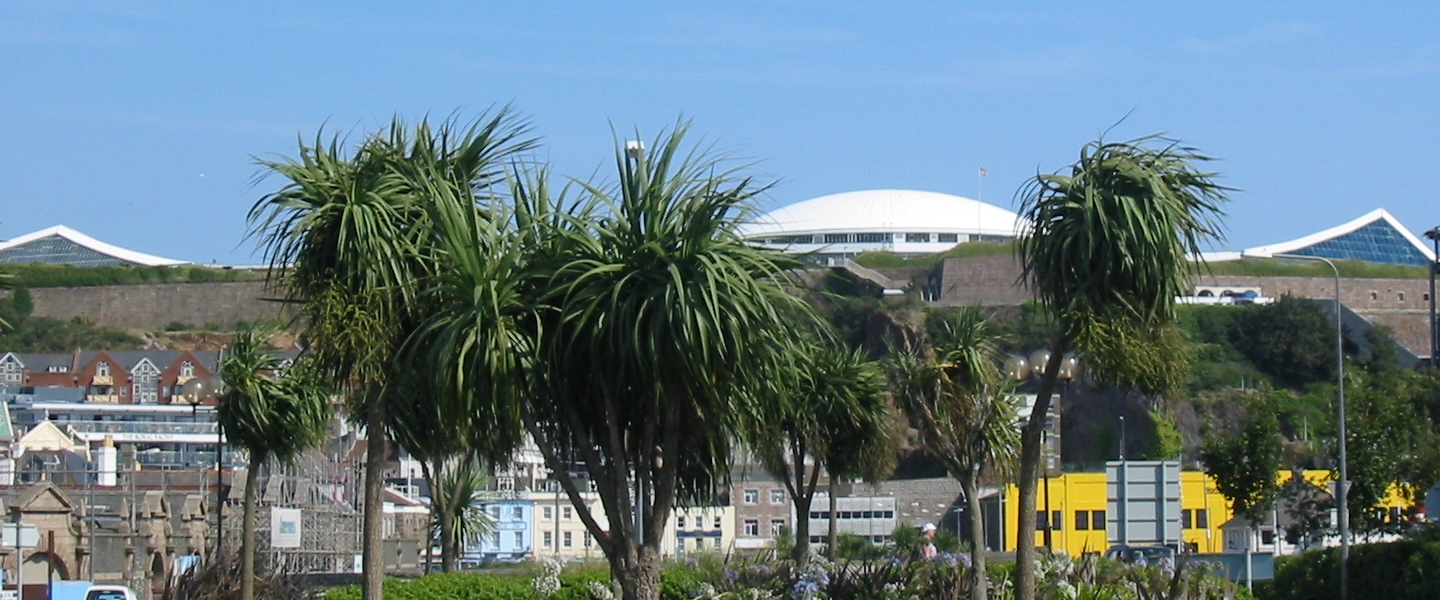
Fort Regent provides covered facilities for sport.

In sporting events in which Jersey does not have international representation, when the British Home Nations are competing separately, islanders that do have high athletic skill may choose to compete for any of the Home Nations. There are, however, restrictions on subsequent transfers to represent another Home Nation.

== Redevelopment of sports facilities ==
In 2021, the Government of Jersey published a report Inspiring Active Places Strategy. The strategy will have a total cost of circa £100 million.

The plan proposes the removal of sports facilities from Fort Regent by early 2022, which is "beyond the end of its useful life". The report states it is not the best location for health and fitness facilities for St. Helier residents. By the end of 2021, there will therefore be the need to create temporary or alternative facilities to enable sport relocation from Fort Regent.

Les Quennevais in St. Brelade will be redeveloped in two phases. First will be to provision of a new skate park and a four court netball facility as well as a 3G football pitch. The Jersey indoor netball facility is current at Les Ormes, which is being closed and redeveloped by March 2023. The target date for this phase of development is 2024. By 2032, phase 2 will be complete: the existing sports centre buildings will be demolished and replaced with parking after the construction of a new leisure centre, incorporating an eight lane 25 m swimming pool, an eight court sports hall, a permanent recreational gymnastics facility and a large fitness suite. The site will also be the new home of the Jersey Library Les Quennevais Branch.

A new facility will be constructed at Le Rocquier school to replace the existing school facilities. The target date for this is 2024/25. This will also provide a hub for public sports in the east of the island. It includes a large sports hall, a 3G football pitch, a permanent specialist gymnastics facility and a large fitness suite. There is the potential to provide a new swimming pool.

Part of the plan includes providing a new Island Stadium by 2025/26. This will be partly privately funded. The stadium will serve the Jersey Bulls football club and the Jersey Reds rugby club. It will have capacity for over 2500, of which 1500 will be covered. The facility will also have a large snooker, billiards and darts facility located on site. Springfield, the current football stadium, will be refurbished to provide better public active facilities and a new town community park, with the single stadium pitch replaced with two smaller 5-a-side pitches by 2026/27. However, in the interim, parts of Springfield will be redeveloped to provide more parking.

The plan includes the reprovision of facilities from Fort Regent. By 2030, a new leisure centre will be constructed in the town centre, on the site of the Waterfront centre. The leases on the current Waterfront development terminate in 2027. It will include a large swimming pool, with minimal spectator provision, and 1,250 square metres (13,500 ft^{2}) of health and fitness space. This will re-accommodate the Aquasplash facility, which will be demolished, and the current fitness facilities at the Fort. Due to the high-density town centre location, there is the opportunity to construct a three-storey residential site above the facility.

== Action sports ==
There is a skate park located on the New North Quay in St Helier. The equipment has been there since around 2008. It was temporarily closed in 2018 over safety concerns. There is also a skate park at St John's Recreation Centre.

There is currently a debate over where to construct a new skate park on the island. In 2018, the Sports Minister appointed a consultant to find a new site for a modern skate park in St Helier. His preferred location was 'somewhere on the waterfront'. The skate park was allocated funding under the Government Plan. On 26 January 2020, a site at the Les Quennevais sports centre was confirmed as the site for the park, with the aim for the site to be opened by the end of 2020. There was also plans for "additional skate-friendly areas across the island".

On 9 June 2020, it was announced the building on the skate park had been delayed due to the COVID-19 pandemic, but that the project would still go ahead. Jersey BMX Olympian Alex Coleborn said in 2021, 'the Island just needs something better ... we haven't had something that good in years'.

Some plans for the regeneration of Fort Regent included facilities for action sports.

== Association football ==
The Jersey Football Association supervises football in Jersey. The Jersey Football Combination has nine teams in its top division. The Jersey national football team plays in the annual Muratti cup and the bi-annual Island Games competition among others. Jersey Bulls F.C. is the first team from the island to play in the English football league system after they joined the Combined Counties Football League in August 2019.

Graeme Le Saux was the first Jersey footballer to play for England.

== Athletics ==
The Jersey Marathon has been an annual event since 2006.

Jersey hosts an annual around-the-island endurance walk, The Itex-Rotary Walk. This walk goes anti-clockwise around the coast of Jersey for 48.1 miles and has for a number of years started and finished at the Harbour Terminal in St Helier. The walk starts at 3 AM and as an example of the difficulty in completing the walk, in 2009 of the 1,308 starters only 779 finished.

The Jersey Spartan Athletics Club was founded in 1978.

Jersey track athlete Colin Campbell represented Great Britain at the 1968 Mexico Olympics and 1972 Munich Olympics. He also competed in the bobsleigh discipline in the 1976 Winter Olympics in Innsbruck.

== Cricket ==
Jersey is an associate member of the International Cricket Council (ICC). The Jersey cricket team plays in the Inter-insular match among others. Cricket has seen massive crowd support for twenty-20 representative matches. The main cricket ground is the Grainville Cricket Ground at Saint Saviour and has hosted international cricket competitions, including hosting Women's One Day Internationals for England Women.

== Cycling ==
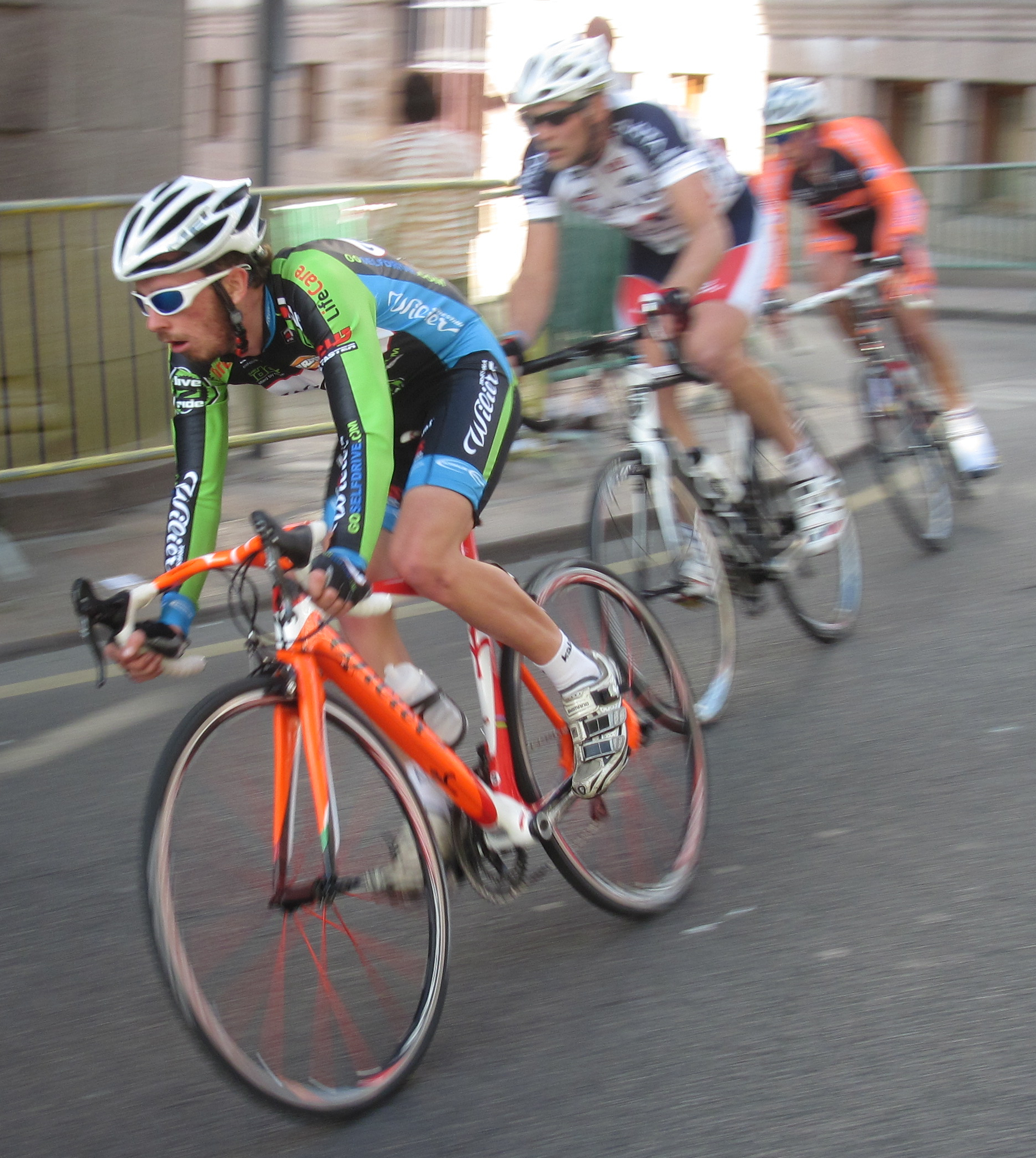
The Jersey Town Criterium in Saint Helier in 2011

Velo Sport Jersey Cycling Club and Caesarean Cycling Club organise cycle sport events. The Jersey Cycling Association Youth Academy promotes youth participation. Equipe Flamme Rouge concentrates on coaching, mentoring and European Sportive events.

The Rubis International Criterium and Road Race Weekend was formed in 2009 by Velo Sport Jersey Cycling Club. Jersey hosted time trials of the Tour de Bretagne in 2007, and a full leg in 2010.

== Golf ==
There are a number of golf courses, including La Moye Golf Club.

Two golfers from Jersey have won The Open Championship seven times between them, Harry Vardon winning six times and Ted Ray winning once. Harry and Ted also won the U.S. Open one time each and Harry's brother Tom Vardon had some smaller wins on European Tours. Tommy Horton is a long-term Jersey resident.

== Gymnastics ==
There are four gymnastics clubs in Jersey. Jersey Gymnastics Club, Regent Gymnastics Club, De Monde Gymnastics Academy and Jersey Special Gymnastics Club. Jersey Gymnastics Club is the largest, and has a training facility in St. John. Gymnasts regularly compete in the island Games.

== Horse racing ==
For horse racing, Les Landes Race Course can be found at Les Landes in St Ouen next to the ruins of Grosnez Castle.

== Motorsports ==
Jersey also has a small selection of motorsports available. The most well-known of these is hill climbs at Bouley Bay, which hosts both national and international hill climbs. There are a few events which take place on the beach at St Ouen. One of these is sand racing and this takes place throughout the year. Finally there is also a go kart track at the Living Legend, which features electric go karts with speeds of up to 35 mph. Karting events on the island are organised by the Jersey Kart & Motor Club, which has been operational on the island since 1960.

Several former motor racing drivers live in the island. 1992 Formula 1 world champion Nigel Mansell and ex F1 driver Derek Warwick both live there. Warwick is the owner of Honda garages in Jersey, which are named Derek Warwick Honda.

There is also one locally born racing driver: James Walker. Walker took part in British F3 from 2004 to 2006 and raced for Fortec Motorsport in the Renault World Series in 2007–2008, He then switched to P1 Motorsport for 2009. He has also raced in Superleague Formula and the Daytona 24 hours.

== Pétanque ==
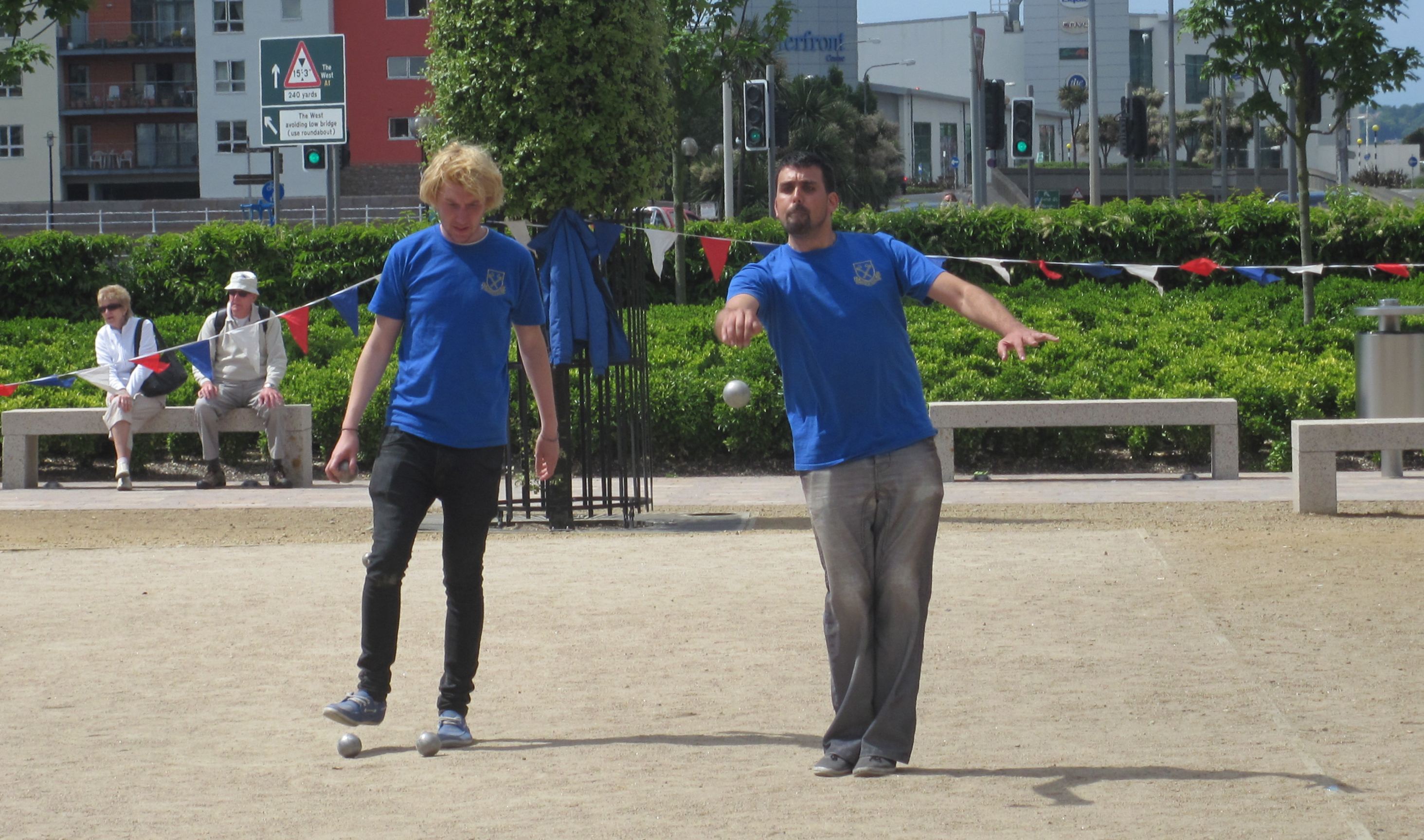
Pétanque in Saint Helier in 2011

There are a number of pétanque pitches around the island, including in central Saint Helier. Petanque is a boules sport. The Jersey Petanque Association is the governing body.

== Rugby union ==
There are several rugby union clubs in the island including a rugby academy for under 18s and Les Quennevais Rugby Club. The island's main side, Jersey Reds, enjoyed a meteoric rise through the English pyramid beginning in 2005 and culminating in promotion to England's second level, the RFU Championship, for 2012–13. The team survived relegation scares in both of its first two seasons in the Championship, finishing in the final safe spot of 11th in both seasons.

== Shooting ==
Colin Mallett won Jersey's sole Commonwealth Games gold medal in Auckland in 1990 for men's fullbore rifle.

== Table tennis ==
The Jersey Table Tennis Association (Table Tennis Jersey) is the governing body responsible for table tennis in Jersey. The organisation has been affiliated to the ITTF (International Table Tennis Federation) since 1935 and is also affiliated to the European Table Tennis Union, the Commonwealth Games Association of Jersey, the Commonwealth Table Tennis Federation, Island Games Association, Jeux des îles, and the Jersey Sports Council. Table Tennis Jersey has its own purpose built sports hall, the Geoff Reed Table Tennis Centre at FB Fields, which was the venue for table tennis at the 2015 Island Games.

== Swimming ==
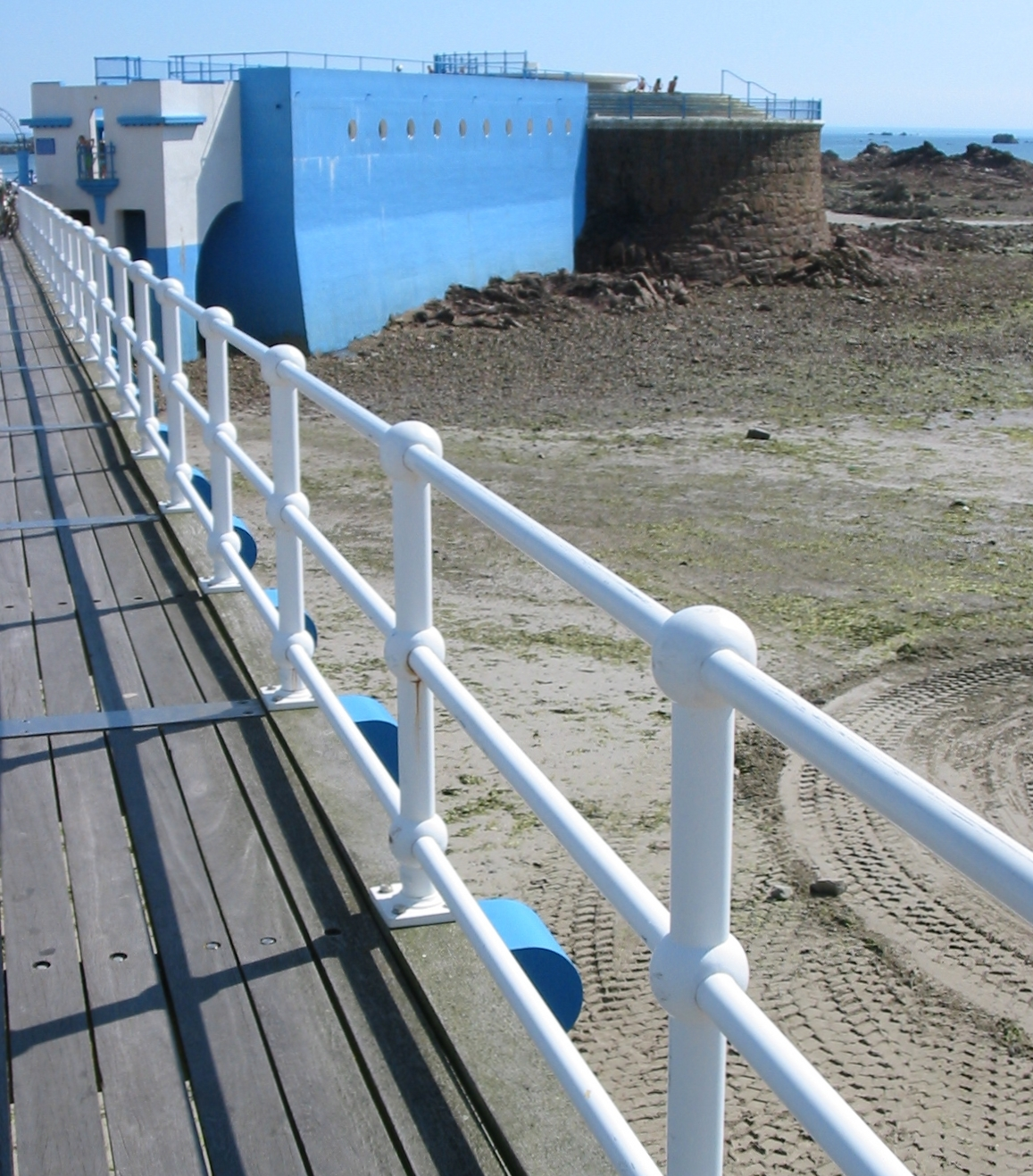
The Havre des Pas bathing pool was opened in 1895 and refurbished in 2001.

Jersey has two public indoor swimming pools; a third is used by schools, clubs and associations. Swimming in the sea, surfing, windsurfing and other marine sports are practised. Jersey Swimming Club have organised an annual swim from Elizabeth Castle to Saint Helier Harbour for over 50 years. A round-island swim is a major challenge which a select number of swimmers have achieved.

Simon Militis has represented Great Britain at the 2000 Sydney Olympics and England at the 2002 Commonwealth Games.

== Triathlon ==
The Jersey Triathlon Club is amongst the earliest formed in the UK (1985). With sheltered bays, clear blue seas and golden sandy shores, it makes for an idyllic venue for the sport of Triathlon. Members range from novices right up to Commonwealth Games athletes. A full calendar of Triathlon and, in the winter Duathlon, races are organised by the club which is affiliated to British Triathlon.

The club has a successful junior section (Aztec Jersey Tristars) which boasts a membership of over 100 athletes aged 6 to 16. In 2015 Jersey was permitted to enter Tristars athletes in British Triathlon's Inter Regional Championships for the first time as a separate 'region' (without being an official region of British Triathlon) as athletes were not eligible for selection by the South Central region which is the region to which Jersey belongs. In 2018 Jersey finished 2nd overall at the Tristars Inter Regional Championships at Mallory Park in Leicester, behind Scotland and above all of the larger English regions.

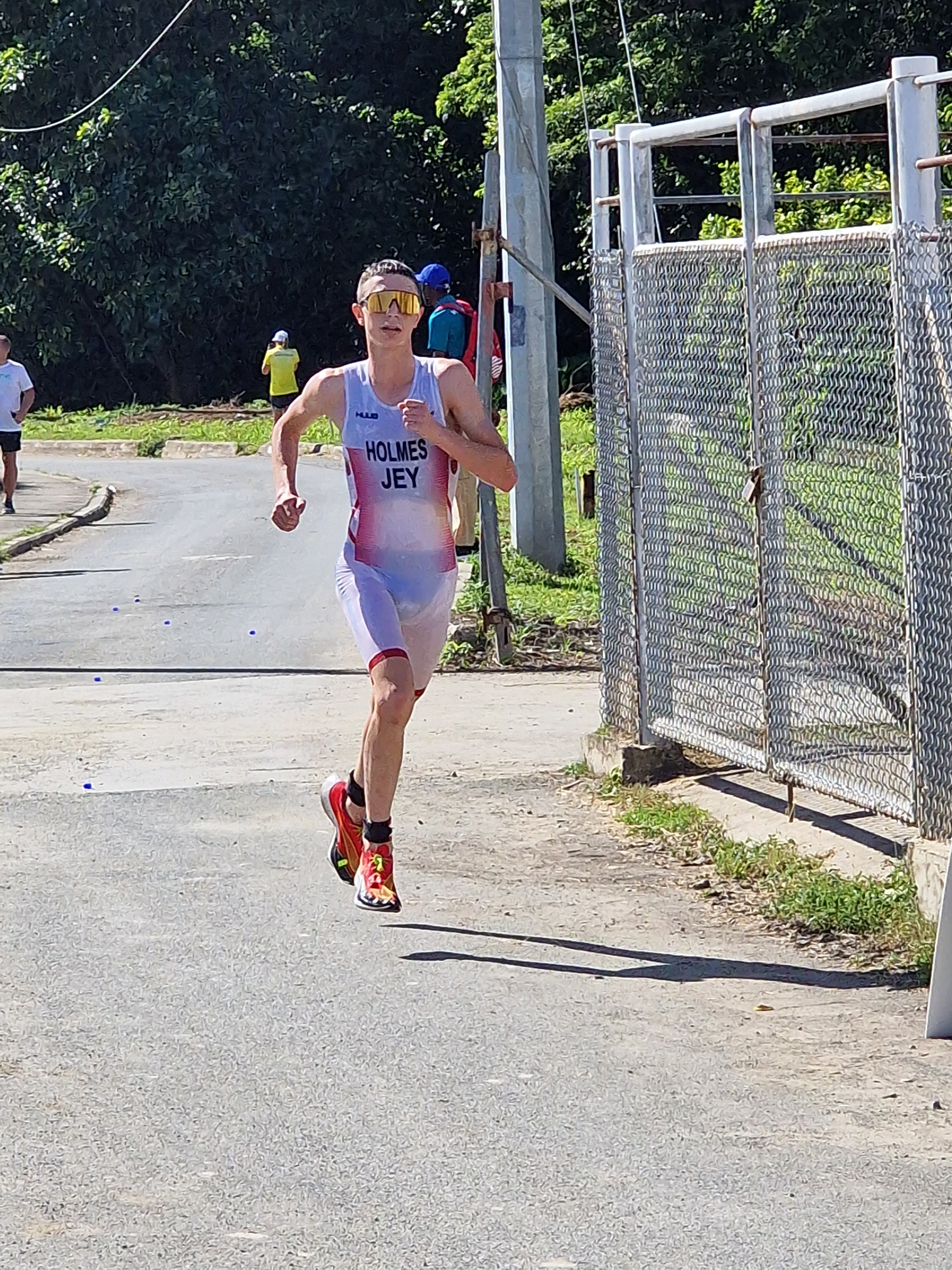
Luke Holmes, Trinbago 2023

In the 2014 Commonwealth Games in Glasgow professional Jersey triathlete Daniel Halksworth made a name for himself by breaking from the chase pack to complete the cycle section in a clear third position behind Olympic medalists Alastair and Jonny Brownlee, going on to finish in 17th position. Halksworth is Jersey's most well known triathlete having turned professional after representing Jersey at the 2007 Island Games in Rhodes. The highlights of his professional career include victories at Ironman UK in 2012 and 2013, twice qualifying for the Hawaii Ironman World Championships (Kona) and a dominant victory in his home Island Games in 2015.

Ollie Turner represented Jersey in Triathlon at the Gold Coast Commonwealth Games, finishing in 26th position and in the 2022 Games in Birmingham where he finished in 15th. Ollie was included in the professional triathlete roster of Super League Triathlon having qualified for a 'Golden Ticket' at the Super League Triathlon Jersey 2018.

At the 2023 Commonwealth Youth Games in Trinidad and Tobago Luke Holmes and Siena Stephens became the first Jersey Triathletes to be included in the Jersey team at a Youth games. Holmes went on to win the gold medal in the individual event with Stephens finishing fifth, and the pair combined in the mixed team relay to bring home a bronze medal for Jersey. Holmes' gold medal was only the second every gold medal for Jersey following Daniel Halksworth's gold medal in swimming 19 years earlier.

== Other sports ==
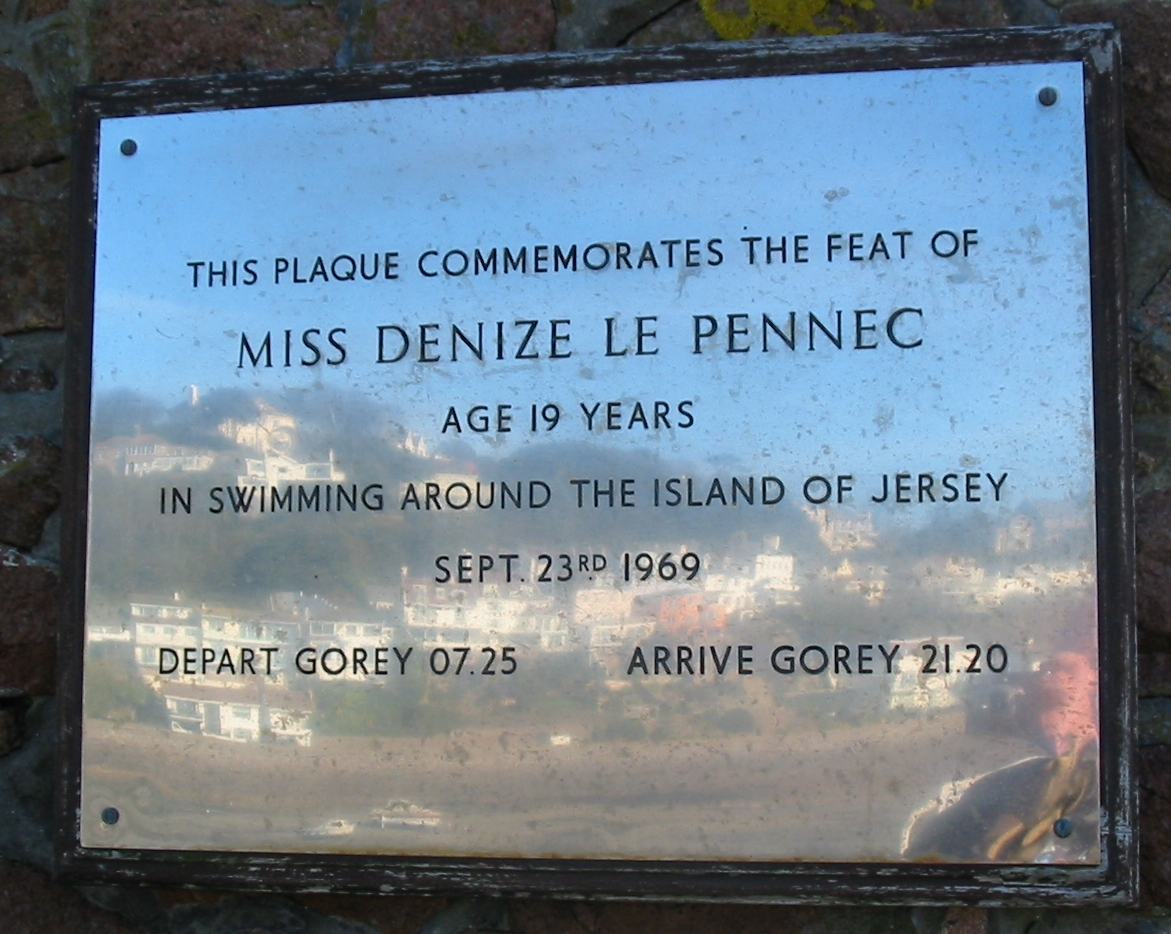
A plaque at Gorey commemorates Denize Le Pennec's round-island swim on 23 September 1969.

Basketball in Jersey is governed by the Jersey Basketball Association. Its teams have been playing in an annual Inter Insular match against Guernsey Basketball since 1970 where each Island takes turn to host.

There are few facilities for extreme sports and youth sports such as skateboarding, BMX, and inline skating. Coastal cliffs provide opportunities for rock climbing.

The Royal Channel Island Yacht Club is based in Jersey.

Champion Tenpin Bowler siblings Robbie Rive and Kris Marie Rive were selected to represent Jersey in the 2013 QubicaAMF World Cup in Krasnoyarsk, Russia.

Jersey has a strong touch (rugby) presence with a mixed open team having representing the island at the world cup, European championships and the home nations. Currently Jersey is 4th in Europe. Every year the island competes in an inter-insular with Guernsey. Most recently, in 2023, jersey won the entire event including the men's, women's and mixed open games. In 2016 Jersey hosted the European championship with 1000 competitors from around Europe, and have continued to travel to attend the competition worldwide.

== See also ==
- Jersey at the Commonwealth Games
- Springfield Stadium
- Sport in the United Kingdom
- Sport in Guernsey
- Sport in Alderney
