= Armenian Table Tennis Federation =

Sporting Organization

The Armenian Table Tennis Federation (Armenian: Հայաստանի սեղանի թենիսի ֆեդերացիա), is the regulating body of table tennis in Armenia, governed by the Armenian Olympic Committee. The headquarters of the federation is located in Yerevan.

== History ==
The Federation is currently led by president Felix Sargsyan. The Federation oversees the training of table tennis specialists. Armenian table tennis athletes participate in various European and international level table tennis competitions, including the European Championships. The Federation is a full member of the International Table Tennis Federation and the European Table Tennis Union.

== See also ==
- Sport in Armenia
