= Table Tennis Association of Wales =

Governing body of table tennis in Wales

The Table Tennis Association of Wales (Welsh: Cymdeithas Tenis Bwrdd Cymru) (TTAW) (founded 1921) is the national governing body of table tennis in Wales. It is affiliated to the International Table Tennis Federation (ITTF) and the European Table Tennis Union, and was a founding member of both organisations—in 1926 and 1956 respectively.

The TTAW has over 1000 members. It regulates and manages competitions—including ten leagues, the Welsh Open Championships, the Welsh Closed Championships and the Team Championship of Wales— and is responsible for the selection, organisation and management of the Welsh national representative teams. The Wales men's team was ranked 43 in the world (of 132 ranked country associations) by the ITTF, as at 2 July 2009.

The Table Tennis Association of Wales is based in Cardiff.
