= Czech Table Tennis Association =

- Sport: Table tennis
- Jurisdiction: Czech Republic
- Abbreviation: ČAST
- Founded: 1926
- Affiliation: ITTF
- Regional affiliation: ETTU
- Headquarters: Prague, Czech Republic
- President: Zbyněk Špaček
- Men's coach: Josef Plachý
- Women's coach: Petr Nedoma

Official website
- www.ping-pong.cz
- (Czech Republic)

The Czech Table Tennis Association (Czech: Česká asociace stolního tenisu) is the National Sporting Organisation for the Sport of Table Tennis in the Czech Republic and is affiliated with the ITTF (International Table Tennis Federation) which oversees the international governance and development of Table Tennis and the ETTU (European Table Tennis Union) which oversees the sport development at a regional level.

Czech Table Tennis Association is member of the Czech Olympic Committee.

== History ==
Table Tennis Association was created in 1926 as Czechoslovak Table Tennis Association. It was one of the founding members of the International Table Tennis Federation.
