= Jersey Table Tennis Association =

The Jersey Table Tennis Association (the JTTA) was established in 1923 and is the governing body responsible for table tennis in Jersey. The organisation has been affiliated to the ITTF (International Table Tennis Federation) since 1935.

Table Tennis Jersey is the overarching name for table tennis in Jersey, of which the JTTA is the lead body. The JTTA is also affiliated to the European Table Tennis Union, the Commonwealth Games Association of Jersey, the Commonwealth Table Tennis Federation, Island Games Association, Jeux des îles, the Jersey Sports Council.

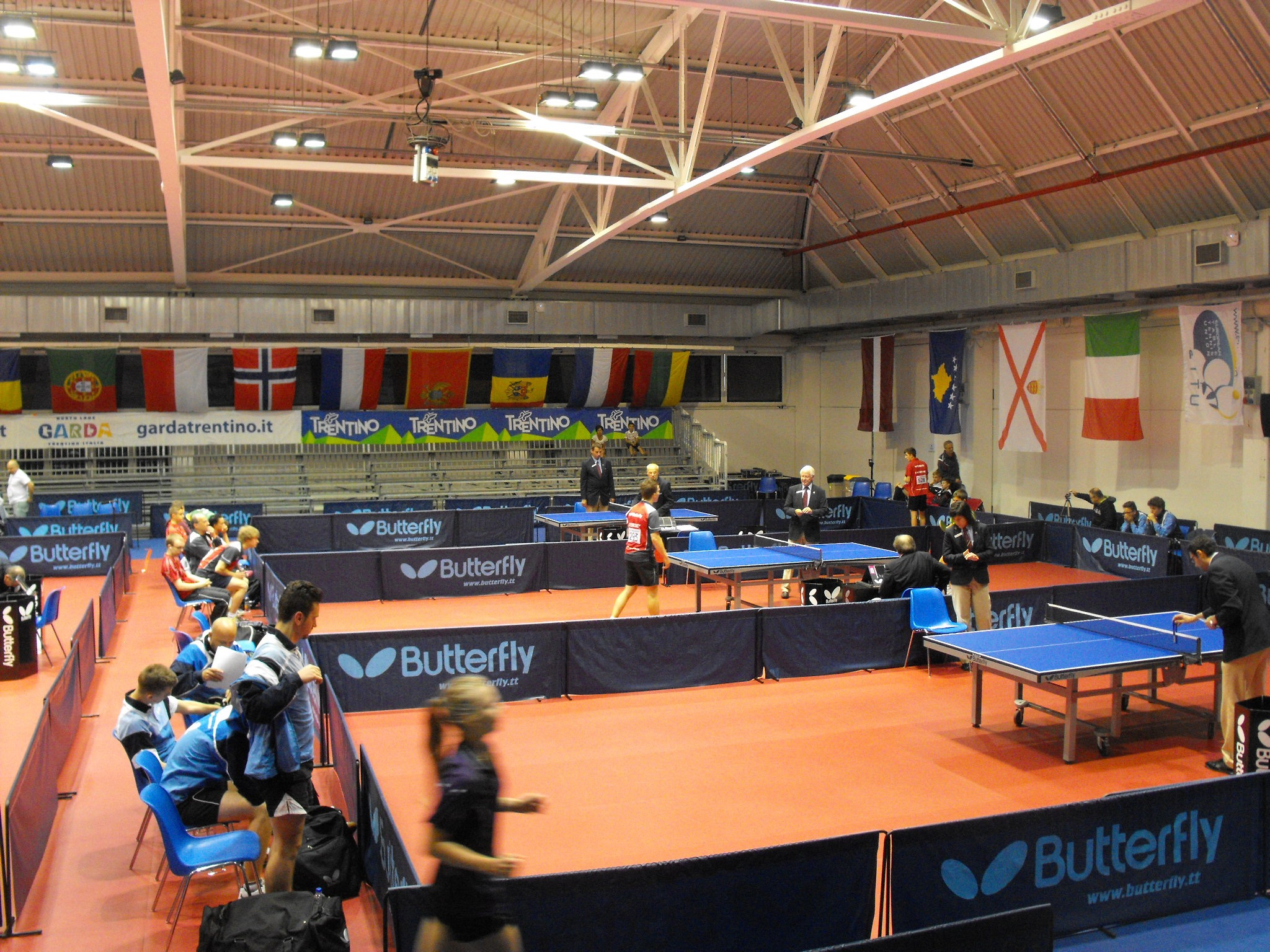
Jersey junior boys at European Youth Championships 2014 Riva Del Garda

Table Tennis Jersey's aim is to promote table tennis as a sport and a social activity to all ages. It regulates and manages competitions and is responsible for the selection, organisation and management of the Jersey representative teams. It runs a variety of different classes and training sessions throughout each week. Table Tennis Jersey compete in International competitions through all age groups, having had representative teams at the World Championships, European Championships, the Commonwealth Table Tennis Championships, the European Youth Championships, the Senior Schools' and Primary Schools' International Championships.

Thanks to the vision and generosity of the late Geoff Reed, a facility was built at FB Playing Fields, St Clement which is the headquarters and main playing location of a number of Island clubs. Also Affiliated to Table Tennis Jersey is St Mary's club which operates out of St Mary's sports hall. The Geoff Reed Table Tennis Centre is a purpose built facility which has hosted a number of Grand Prix satellite events, was one of the designated 2012 Olympic training venues for the south-east of England, and was the venue for table tennis at the 2015 Island Games.
