= Table Tennis Federation of Kosovo =

- Sport: Table tennis
- Jurisdiction: Kosovo
- Affiliation: ITTF
- Affiliation date: 2003
- Regional affiliation: ETTU
- Headquarters: Pristina

Official website
- www.fppk.com
- (Kosovo)

The Table Tennis Federation of Kosovo (TTFK) (Albanian: Federata e Pingpongut tė Kosovės, Serbian: Стонотениски савез Косова / Stonoteniski savez Kosova) is the governing body responsible for table tennis in Kosovo.

== History ==
The TTFK was recognised by sport's governing body, in this case the International Table Tennis Federation in 2003.

In July 2022, competitors from Kosovo were prevented from participating in the European Youth Table Tennis Championships held in Belgrade, Serbia due to political reasons.
