= Roy Evans (table tennis) =

Welsh professional table tennis player from Cardiff (1909-1998)

Personal information
- Full name: Roy Morgan Evans
- Nationality: British
- Born: 8 October 1909 Cardiff, Wales
- Died: 18 May 1998 (aged 88)
- Spouse: Nancy Jackson (m. 1933)

General Secretary of Welsh TT Association
- In office 1933–1939

General Secretary of Welsh TT Association
- In office 1951–1967

Sport
- Country: Wales; Great Britain
- Sport: Table tennis

Roy Evans (8 October 1909 – 18 May 1998) was a Welsh professional table tennis player from Cardiff. He served as the president of the International Table Tennis Federation (ITTF) from 1967 to 1987. During his tenure at the ITTF, he successfully campaigned for the addition of table tennis in the Olympic Games. In 1984, the Olympics added table tennis as an event, and the first competition was held during the 1988 Summer Olympics in Seoul. Juan Antonio Samaranch, the former IOC president, awarded him the Olympic Order for his role as an advocate for the sport. Evans was named the "Honorary Life President" of the organization in 1987 and was appointed OBE in the 1972 Queen's Birthday Honors list.

== Biography ==
Roy Evans was the son of the first treasurer of The Table Tennis Association of Wales, Morgan "Mog" Evans. He was born on 8 October 1909 in Cardiff, United Kingdom, and died at the age of 88 on 18 May 1998.

== Career ==
Evans played for Wales between 1931 and 1933 and was the honorary general secretary of the country's sport governing body from 1933 to 1939. Between 1951 and 1967, he was honored as the general secretary of the International Federation before he held the office of the ITTF president for 20 years. He was later named Honorary Life President in 1987.

== Personal life ==
Evans met his future wife Nancy Jackson before a match against England in 1929, when the Welsh men and women players were brought together for a practice in Cardiff. They married in 1933. In the 1938 women's world table tennis ranking, Nancy ranked seventh. In his book ColouredPins on a Map, Evans said that he had been to at least 50 countries for the purpose of promoting table tennis.
