= Nancy Evans (table tennis) =

Welsh table tennis player (1903-1998)

Personal information
- Born: Nancy Jackson; 1903
- Died: 28 July 1998 (aged 94–95) Cardiff, Wales
- Spouse: Roy Evans (m. 1933)

General Secretary of Welsh TT Association
- In office 1945–1989

Sport
- Sport: Table tennis

Nancy Evans née Jackson (1903 – 28 July 1998) was a Welsh table tennis player.

== Career ==
In the 1930s and 1940s Nancy Evans was the leading table tennis player in Wales. Evans was appointed as Welsh TT Association General Secretary in 1945, a position she hold until 1989. She was member of the first committee of the European Table Tennis Union. She was elected as ETTUs first ‘permanent’ Honorary Secretary/Treasurer in 1960.

She was married to Roy Evans in 1933.

The ETTU Cup was renamed ETTU Nancy Evans Cup after her in 1984.

She died in Cardiff.
