= Jersey Half Marathon =

Road running event in Jersey, Channel Islands

- Date: May
- Location: Jersey, Channel Islands
- Event type: Road
- Distance: Half marathon
- Established: 1989; 37 years ago
- Course records: Men: 1:08:00; Women: 1:17:22
- Website: www.runjersey.co.uk
- 2026 Jersey Half Marathon

The Jersey Half Marathon (currently known as the "Run Jersey Half Marathon") is an annual half marathon staged in the north west of Jersey, Channel Islands.

== History ==
The event was organised by the Jersey Hash House Harriers from 1989, until 2011. Run Jersey took over organising the event from 2012.

== The course ==
The course is set over the parishes of St. John, St. Lawrence, St. Mary, and St. Ouen.

== Results ==
=== 2022 ===
Place	Place	Bib	Gun Time	Chip Time	Firstname	Lastname	Gender	Age Group	Club	Team Name
1	1	58	1:18:49	1h 18m 48s 273ms	Will	Dupre	m	Male 40-49	Jersey Spartan Athletic Club	
2	2	38	1:19:59	1h 19m 59s 344ms	James	Oliver	m	Male 17-39		
3	3	322	1:20:57	1h 20m 57s 162ms	Phil	Ahier	m	Male 50-59	VAC	
4	4	252	1:21:23	1h 21m 22s 191ms	Paul	Duxbury	m	Male 40-49	Jersey Spartan Athletic Club	
5	5	393	1:22:27	1h 22m 25s 640ms	Wayne	Quenault	m	Male 17-39	Jersey Tri Club	
6	6	29	1:24:53	1h 24m 53s 347ms	Alan	Falle	m	Male 17-39		
7	7	288	1:25:47	1h 25m 44s 349ms	Michael	Anderson	m	Male 17-39		
8	8	363	1:25:50	1h 25m 50s 559ms	Nicholas	Pilnick	m	Male 17-39		
9	9	235	1:26:06	1h 26m 5s 281ms	Ashley	Lewis	m	Male 17-39		
10	10	320	1:26:22	1h 26m 19s 36ms	Benjamin	Watts	m	Male 40-49	Jersey Spartan Athletic Club	
11	11	253	1:26:54	1h 26m 51s 685ms	Jeff	Ferguson	m	Male 40-49	Jersey Spartan Athletic Club	
12	12	258	1:27:33	1h 27m 32s 234ms	Henry	Wood	m	Male 17-39		
13	13	326	1:27:46	1h 27m 43s 557ms	James	Allan	m	Male 17-39		
14	14	323	1:28:34	1h 28m 29s 495ms	Avelino	De Jesus	m	Male 40-49		
15	15	159	1:28:57	1h 28m 56s 800ms	Stefano	Merella	m	Male 50-59	ASD Cagliari atletica leggera	
16	16	342	1:29:01	1h 28m 57s 786ms	Justin	Spanswick	m	Male 40-49		
17	17	244	1:29:30	1h 29m 26s 776ms	David	Osborne	m	Male 40-49		
18	18	302	1:30:25	1h 30m 21s 762ms	Jonny	Willows	m	Male 17-39		
19	19	37	1:31:04	1h 31m 3s 273ms	Sophie	Tomaszczyk	f	Female 17-39	West 4 Harriers	
20	20	387	1:31:13	1h 31m 11s 54ms	Nick	Williams	m	Male 40-49	Jersey Spartan Athletic Club	
21	21	309	1:31:55	1h 31m 53s 616ms	Joanne	Stanfield	f	Female 50-59	Trentham	
22	22	498	1:32:43	1h 32m 23s 127ms	James	Hadley-Piggin	m	Male 17-39		
23	23	228	1:32:57	1h 32m 55s 682ms	Chris	Hall	m	Male 50-59		
24	24	338	1:33:29	1h 33m 27s 770ms	Beth	Rainbow	f	Female 17-39		
25	25	195	1:34:17	1h 34m 14s 178ms	Michael	Wakeham	m	Male 17-39	6am Club	
26	26	398	1:34:18	1h 34m 14s 340ms	Matthew	Gambles	m	Male 50-59		
27	27	298	1:34:31	1h 34m 27s 749ms	Alexandru-Vlad	Rafa	m	Male 17-39	Jersey Spartan Athletic Club	
28	28	396	1:35:07	1h 35m 5s 116ms	Dale	Quenault	m	Male 17-39	JTC	
29	29	385	1:35:16	1h 35m 13s 616ms	Rob	Morton	m	Male 17-39	Jersey tri club	
30	30	209	1:36:28	1h 36m 20s 511ms	Genesis	Perez	m	Male 40-49		
31	31	184	1:36:30	1h 36m 27s 728ms	Matt	Wilson	m	Male 40-49		
32	32	261	1:36:42	1h 36m 37s 602ms	Kyle	Dougherty	m	Male 17-39		
33	33	262	1:36:43	1h 36m 39s 752ms	Jason	Harris	m	Male 17-39		
34	34	270	1:36:44	1h 36m 42s 283ms	Harry	Grace	m	Male 17-39		
35	35	44	1:36:59	1h 36m 55s 510ms	Gashirai	Masvikeni	m	Male 17-39		
36	36	222	1:37:10	1h 37m 4s 433ms	Nick	Hudson	m	Male 17-39		
37	37	111	1:37:19	1h 37m 5s 344ms	Yasmin	Rasul	f	Female 17-39		
38	38	128	1:37:27	1h 37m 25s 291ms	Jilesh	Chohan	m	Male 50-59		
39	39	53	1:37:28	1h 37m 27s 845ms	Richard	Heap	m	Male 50-59	Clapham Chasers	
40	40	409	1:37:30	1h 37m 29s 675ms	Scott	Harben	m	Male 40-49	Trail monkeys	
41	41	355	1:37:36	1h 37m 33s 190ms	Ant	Medder	m	Male 40-49		
42	42	330	1:37:38	1h 37m 27s 284ms	Ryan	Paterson	m	Male 17-39		
43	43	162	1:37:41	1h 37m 38s 68ms	Sarah	Taylor	f	Female 50-59	Trentham RC	
44	44	286	1:38:14	1h 38m 7s 950ms	Darren	Clark	m	Male 50-59		
45	45	349	1:38:18	1h 38m 10s 599ms	Natalie	Smart	f	Female 17-39		
46	46	10	1:38:52	1h 38m 52s 61ms	Samantha	Noyce	f	Female 17-39	City of Salisbury A&R club	
47	47	388	1:38:55	1h 38m 50s 304ms	Donald	Connolly	m	Male 40-49	Jersey Spartan Athletic Club	
48	48	7	1:39:01	1h 38m 57s 125ms	Lara	James	f	Female 40-49	Jersey Spartan Athletic Club	
49	49	265	1:39:05	1h 39m 2s 679ms	Paul	Fitzsimmons	m	Male 17-39		
50	50	376	1:39:17	1h 39m 11s 561ms	Vicky	Wiseman	f	Female 17-39		
51	51	2	1:39:25	1h 39m 22s 765ms	Louise	Falle	f	Female 40-49	Trail Monkeys	
52	52	408	1:39:42	1h 39m 33s 217ms	Chris	McCarthy	m	Male 40-49		
53	53	257	1:40:18	1h 40m 11s 445ms	Paul	Bish	m	Male 60-69		
54	54	377	1:40:28	1h 40m 15s 102ms	Charles	Le Feuvre	m	Male 60-69		
55	55	400	1:40:32	1h 40m 27s 737ms	Smoden	Chimbalu	m	Male 40-49		
56	56	234	1:40:49	1h 40m 44s 774ms	Spencer	Woolley	m	Male 50-59		
57	57	224	1:41:52	1h 41m 46s 741ms	Harry	Trower	m	Male 17-39	FFC	
58	58	82	1:41:52	1h 41m 47s 822ms	Martyn	White	m	Male 40-49		
59	59	131	1:41:53	1h 41m 33s 503ms	Peter	Walker	m	Male 17-39		
60	60	389	1:41:57	1h 41m 51s 788ms	Danny	Richardson	m	Male 17-39		
61	61	307	1:42:01	1h 41m 33s 879ms	Leon	Pierre	m	Male 17-39		
62	62	308	1:42:15	1h 42m 10s 467ms	Marcelo	Rodrigues	m	Male 50-59		Watford Joggers
63	63	369	1:42:24	1h 42m 13s 655ms	Aaron	Rondel	m	Male 17-39	Vegan Runners	Watford Joggers
64	64	249	1:42:45	1h 42m 39s 15ms	David	Wheatley	m	Male 50-59		
65	65	311	1:42:48	1h 42m 40s 303ms	Mark	Sanchez	m	Male 17-39		Watford Joggers
66	66	146	1:42:49	1h 42m 38s 356ms	Gareth	Spence	m	Male 17-39		Watford Joggers
67	67	354	1:42:53	1h 42m 42s 292ms	Robert	Anton	m	Male 50-59		Watford Joggers
68	68	185	1:43:12	1h 43m 2s 100ms	Claire	Dupoy	f	Female 40-49		Watford Joggers
69	69	397	1:43:13	1h 43m 9s 742ms	Matt	Ruane	m	Male 50-59		
70	70	404	1:43:14	1h 43m 7s 562ms	Dave	Obrien	m	Male 60-69		Watford Joggers
71	71	220	1:43:18	1h 43m 15s 342ms	Tom	Hall	m	Male 17-39		
72	72	333	1:43:23	1h 43m 16s 474ms	Wayne	English	m	Male 40-49	Rock n Road	Watford Joggers
73	73	229	1:43:29	1h 43m 16s 468ms	Danny	Thorn	m	Male 40-49	Jersey tri club	
74	74	64	1:43:39	1h 43m 33s 15ms	Jon	Lear	m	Male 50-59		
75	75	183	1:43:50	1h 43m 44s 686ms	Neil	Harvey	m	Male 40-49		
76	76	351	1:43:51	1h 43m 44s 992ms	351	351	351	351		
77	77	375	1:43:51	1h 43m 49s 234ms	Natalie	Hodge	f	Female 17-39		
78	78	145	1:43:59	1h 43m 48s 37ms	Frank	Tobin	m	Male 17-39		
79	79	171	1:44:09	1h 43m 59s 195ms	Simon	Allenby	m	Male 17-39		
80	80	211	1:44:26	1h 44m 20s 451ms	Daniel	Jones	m	Male 17-39		
81	81	395	1:44:35	1h 44m 33s 111ms	Norbert	Szywala	m	Male 40-49		
82	82	340	1:44:52	1h 44m 44s 713ms	João Aurelio	Goncalves	m	Male 50-59		
83	83	189	1:45:08	1h 44m 43s 869ms	Steven	Kennedy	m	Male 40-49	Nike Run Club Glasgow	
84	84	34	1:45:09	1h 44m 46s 260ms	Daniel	Andrade	m	Male 17-39		
85	85	33	1:45:09	1h 44m 46s 470ms	Paul	Andrade	m	Male 50-59		
86	86	324	1:45:21	1h 45m 16s 261ms	Heather	Barker	f	Female 17-39		
87	87	194	1:45:30	1h 45m 21s 534ms	Francesca	Monticelli	f	Female 17-39		
88	88	346	1:45:36	1h 45m 30s 699ms	Rob	Benest	m	Male 50-59	Jersey Spartan Athletic Club	
89	89	96	1:45:39	1h 45m 18s 205ms	Hayley	Fairclough	f	Female 40-49		
90	90	285	1:45:51	1h 45m 43s 917ms	Keith	Martin	m	Male 50-59	Jersey Triathlon Club	
91	91	405	1:46:04	1h 46m 0s 607ms	James	Chikaonda	m	Male 17-39		
92	92	390	1:46:15	1h 45m 52s 449ms	Rory	Gleave	m	Male 40-49		
93	93	410	1:46:27	1h 46m 22s 241ms	Glenn	Springate	m	Male 50-59		
94	94	250	1:46:31	1h 46m 28s 920ms	Karl	Fitzpatrick	m	Male 40-49		
95	95	343	1:46:33	1h 46m 27s 420ms	Rhys	Munro	m	Male 17-39		
96	96	188	1:46:35	1h 46m 27s 676ms	Michael	Bateman	m	Male 17-39		
97	97	93	1:46:38	1h 46m 14s 551ms	Sam	Allen	m	Male 17-39		TRENTHAM RUNNING CLUB
98	98	168	1:46:42	1h 46m 33s 255ms	Kerry	Widdowson	f	Female 40-49	Trentham Running Club	
99	99	50	1:47:04	1h 47m 0s 187ms	Mandy	Evans	f	Female 50-59		
100	100	499	1:47:05	1h 47m 1s 354ms	Brenton	Lee	m	Male 40-49		
101	101	318	1:47:07	1h 46m 56s 189ms	Benjamin	Young	m	Male 17-39	Vegan Runners	
102	102	51	1:47:09	1h 46m 54s 608ms	Nicola	Shaw	f	Female 40-49		Trentham Running Club
103	103	329	1:47:09	1h 47m 4s 357ms	John	MacPherson	m	Male 40-49	Spartans	
104	104	65	1:47:11	1h 46m 55s 377ms	Sean	O Leary	m	Male 50-59		
105	105	325	1:47:41	1h 47m 32s 555ms	Paul	Holmes	m	Male 40-49	Bustinskin triathlon club	
106	106	199	1:47:53	1h 47m 51s 350ms	Justin	Lloyd Jones	m	Male 50-59		
107	107	353	1:47:54	1h 47m 44s 107ms	Tim	Ridgway	m	Male 17-39	FRC	
108	108	368	1:47:59	1h 47m 52s 687ms	Emily	Le Beuvant	f	Female 17-39		
109	109	74	1:48:03	1h 47m 46s 171ms	Marco	Goncalves	m	Male 40-49		Trentham Running Club
110	110	399	1:48:40	1h 48m 17s 815ms	Piotr	Peda	m	Male 40-49		
111	111	274	1:48:40	1h 48m 23s 63ms	Philippe	Huelin	m	Male 40-49		
112	112	275	1:48:51	1h 48m 42s 142ms	Laurence	Parkinson	m	Male 40-49		
113	113	394	1:49:09	1h 48m 41s 931ms	Dione	Duhamel	f	Female 17-39		
114	114	294	1:49:37	1h 49m 15s 950ms	Keith	Posner	m	Male 40-49		
115	115	23	1:50:14	1h 49m 58s 990ms	Christopher	Watson	m	Male 50-59		
116	116	152	1:50:18	1h 50m 8s 206ms	Jon	Kirkman	m	Male 50-59		
117	117	206	1:50:19	1h 49m 58s 808ms	Harriet	Taylor	f	Female 17-39		
118	118	91	1:50:40	1h 50m 25s 153ms	Nick	Young	m	Male 50-59	Emersons Green Running Club, Bristol	
119	119	403	1:50:51	1h 50m 41s 106ms	Alexandra	Farmer	f	Female 40-49		
120	120	316	1:50:57	1h 50m 49s 341ms	Judith	Russell	f	Female 50-59		
121	121	125	1:50:58	1h 50m 38s 912ms	Jeremy	Turner	m	Male 17-39		
122	122	124	1:50:59	1h 50m 40s 212ms	Brittany	Collie	f	Female 17-39		
123	123	133	1:51:00	1h 50m 52s 903ms	James	O Brien	m	Male 60-69		
124	124	153	1:51:04	1h 50m 54s 146ms	Charlotte	Kirkman	f	Female 17-39		
125	125	312	1:51:06	1h 50m 44s 983ms	Trevor	Parker	m	Male 50-59	Jersey Tri Club	
126	126	272	1:51:16	1h 50m 57s 589ms	Tony	Clark	m	Male 17-39		
127	127	260	1:51:31	1h 51m 10s 811ms	Adele	Hargreaves	f	Female 40-49		
128	128	371	1:51:38	1h 51m 23s 208ms	Jon	Nash	m	Male 40-49	Trail monkey	
129	129	95	1:51:44	1h 51m 38s 372ms	Virgilio	Mendes	m	Male 40-49		
130	130	218	1:51:58	1h 51m 51s 29ms	Fabio	Hepworth	m	Male 17-39		
131	131	256	1:52:07	1h 52m 0s 358ms	Pani	Papageorgiou	m	Male 40-49		
132	132	313	1:52:25	1h 52m 23s 443ms	Emma	Gwyther	f	Female 40-49		
133	133	142	1:52:32	1h 52m 18s 99ms	Ella	Nicholls	f	Female 17-39		
134	134	266	1:52:37	1h 52m 23s 469ms	Steve	Berry	m	Male 40-49		
135	135	163	1:52:40	1h 52m 35s 749ms	Andrea	Walker	f	Female 50-59	Clowne road runners	
136	136	39	1:52:53	1h 52m 49s 226ms	Vicky	Barratt	f	Female 50-59		
137	137	411	1:52:57	1h 52m 51s 572ms	Nick	Queree	m	Male 50-59		
138	138	414	1:53:01	1h 52m 52s 182ms	Gillian	Tinsley	f	Female 50-59	Trentham Running Club	
139	139	406	1:53:19	1h 53m 9s 266ms	Matthew	Ecobichon	m	Male 40-49		
140	140	321	1:53:28	1h 53m 4s 884ms	Stephen	Francis	m	Male 17-39		
141	141	335	1:53:54	1h 53m 37s 113ms	Steve	Coutanche	m	Male 50-59		
142	142	347	1:54:07	1h 53m 49s 863ms	Chris	Bardsley	m	Male 17-39		
143	143	381	1:54:37	1h 54m 31s 139ms	Peter	Simmons	m	Male 40-49		
144	144	317	1:54:58	1h 54m 36s 292ms	Francis	Joven	m	Male 17-39		
145	145	412	1:55:22	1h 55m 8s 423ms	Hannah	Vautier	f	Female 17-39		
146	146	9	1:55:32	1h 55m 24s 30ms	Ashley	Griffith	f	Female 50-59		
147	147	81	1:55:34	1h 55m 14s 426ms	Alex	Smyth	m	Male 40-49		
148	148	156	1:55:41	1h 55m 27s 154ms	Rachel	Fielden	f	Female 17-39		
149	149	407	1:55:44	1h 55m 28s 773ms	Jon	Fitzmaurice	m	Male 40-49		
150	150	214	1:56:02	1h 55m 54s 718ms	Kamila	Neil	f	Female 40-49		
151	151	295	1:56:25	1h 56m 18s 249ms	Michael	Gibbons	m	Male 60-69	Arena 80	
152	152	92	1:56:38	1h 56m 19s 678ms	Malin	Walkenstrom	f	Female 17-39		
153	153	85	1:56:39	1h 56m 19s 383ms	Sarah	Keane	f	Female 17-39		
154	154	264	1:56:47	1h 56m 39s 297ms	Chelsea	Dollar	f	Female 17-39		Parkrun Pals
155	155	334	1:56:51	1h 56m 30s 508ms	Siobhan	O'Brien	f	Female 17-39	Jersey Triathlon Club	
156	156	16	1:56:54	1h 56m 34s 212ms	Joseph	Hall	m	Male 17-39		Parkrun Pals
157	157	25	1:57:04	1h 57m 1s 183ms	Daryl	Blondel	m	Male 17-39	Trail Monkey	
158	158	365	1:57:09	1h 56m 46s 540ms	Wayne	Sparks	m	Male 17-39		
159	159	11	1:57:12	1h 57m 6s 273ms	Adrian	Bell	m	Male 50-59	Run Nation Running Club	
160	160	117	1:57:19	1h 56m 55s 541ms	Margaret	Fanagan	f	Female 40-49	Watford Joggers	
161	161	291	1:57:29	1h 57m 20s 713ms	Michael	Lempriere	m	Male 60-69		
162	162	55	1:57:48	1h 57m 38s 598ms	Roy	McCarthy	m	Male 60-69		
163	163	382	1:57:50	1h 57m 49s 332ms	Kathy	Gillies	f	Female 60-69		
164	164	138	1:57:51	1h 57m 31s 635ms	Emily	Collie	f	Female 17-39		
165	165	239	1:57:51	1h 57m 41s 314ms	Bernard	Arthur	m	Male 70-79	Jersey Spartan AC	
166	166	236	1:57:57	1h 57m 49s 871ms	Sue	Le Ruez	f	Female 60-69	Jersey Spartan AC	
167	167	19	1:58:01	1h 57m 49s 494ms	Sophie	Galluzzi	f	Female 17-39		
168	168	248	1:58:09	1h 57m 58s 167ms	Rene	Raimondo	m	Male 50-59		
169	169	231	1:58:11	1h 57m 55s 97ms	Amy	Brisley	f	Female 17-39		
170	170	196	1:58:35	1:58:35	April	Hargreaves	f	Female 17-39		
171	171	66	1:58:46	1h 58m 31s 378ms	Mary	Hippsley	f	Female 50-59		
172	172	344	1:58:55	1h 58m 49s 445ms	Paul	Munro	m	Male 40-49		
173	173	186	1:58:57	1h 58m 40s 545ms	Stephen	Mcginness	m	Male 40-49		
174	174	247	1:58:57	1h 58m 43s 452ms	Paul	Nicholls	m	Male 50-59		
175	175	293	1:58:58	1h 58m 43s 801ms	Christina	Hoyles	f	Female 17-39	Jersey Spartans Athletic Club	
176	176	280	1:59:01	1h 58m 33s 207ms	Jason	Pierre	m	Male 50-59		
177	177	149	1:59:07	1h 58m 42s 157ms	Delphinie	McCarthy	f	Female 17-39	University of Portsmouth Athletics Club	
178	178	413	1:59:17	1h 58m 55s 406ms	Harry	Luton	m	Male 17-39		
179	179	12	1:59:36	1h 59m 11s 786ms	Matthew	Taylor	m	Male 40-49		
180	180	299	1:59:49	1h 59m 37s 568ms	Thomas	Wood	m	Male 17-39		
181	181	174	2:00:32	2h 0m 21s 281ms	Max	Thompson	m	Male 17-39		
182	182	245	2:00:45	2h 0m 26s 720ms	Henry	Cornish	m	Male 17-39	Jersey spartan	
183	183	315	2:00:52	2h 0m 51s 141ms	Laura	Kelly	f	Female 17-39		
184	184	273	2:01:10	2h 0m 47s 485ms	Melanie	Roberts	f	Female 40-49		
185	185	90	2:01:16	2h 1m 8s 110ms	Greg	Stretton	m	Male 17-39		
186	186	167	2:01:30	2h 0m 36s 282ms	Alison	Richardson	f	Female 40-49	Dacorum & Tring AC	
187	187	24	2:01:36	2h 1m 16s 783ms	Aaron	Proudfoot	m	Male 17-39		
188	188	108	2:01:55	2h 1m 35s 250ms	Jacqueline	van Heerden	f	Female 17-39		
189	189	306	2:02:14	2h 2m 5s 768ms	Raymo	Frewen	f	Female 17-39	Jersey Tri Club	
190	190	116	2:02:20	2h 1m 56s 482ms	Susan	Defoe	f	Female 60-69	Watford Joggers	
191	191	379	2:02:49	2h 2m 30s 905ms	Ross	De Biasi	m	Male 17-39		
192	192	378	2:02:49	2h 2m 31s 207ms	Mark	Beer	m	Male 17-39		
193	193	242	2:02:50	2h 2m 29s 887ms	Samantha	Wharmby	f	Female 40-49		
194	194	54	2:02:58	2h 2m 56s 745ms	Joan	Inwood	f	Female 50-59		
195	195	173	2:03:09	2h 3m 1s 529ms	Matt	Vasse	m	Male 40-49		
196	196	144	2:03:23	2h 3m 6s 403ms	James	Peart	m	Male 17-39		
197	197	140	2:03:23	2h 3m 5s 536ms	Ashley	Millson	f	Female 17-39		
198	198	202	2:03:23	2h 3m 5s 794ms	Angelique	Regnaud	f	Female 17-39		
199	199	87	2:03:37	2h 3m 9s 756ms	Simon	Harrison	m	Male 50-59		
200	200	292	2:03:57	2h 3m 46s 109ms	Fiona	Gavey	f	Female 17-39		
201	201	276	2:04:20	2h 4m 9s 500ms	Annie	Shine	f	Female 40-49		
202	202	31	2:04:30	2h 4m 17s 720ms	Jayne	Faulkner	f	Female 17-39		
203	203	192	2:04:30	2h 4m 18s 146ms	Phil	Faulkner	m	Male 40-49		
204	204	301	2:05:02	2:05:02	Win Shern	Tan	m	Male 17-39		
205	205	139	2:05:41	2h 5m 24s 221ms	Lowri	Makin	f	Female 17-39		
206	206	328	2:05:49	2h 5m 28s 462ms	Carly	McIver	f	Female 17-39	@jersey.runclub	
207	207	177	2:05:55	2h 5m 43s 42ms	Felicity	Williams	f	Female 17-39	Trentham Running Club	
208	208	204	2:05:56	2h 5m 36s 456ms	John	Bavister	m	Male 17-39		
209	209	126	2:05:56	2h 5m 52s 439ms	Billy	Barnes	m	Male 17-39		
210	210	268	2:05:58	2h 5m 43s 508ms	Holly	Maynard	f	Female 17-39		
211	211	271	2:06:59	2h 6m 45s 786ms	Seloma	Kidane	f	Female 17-39		TRENTHAM RUNNING CLUB
212	212	327	2:07:45	2h 7m 31s 419ms	Tom	Ogden	m	Male 17-39		
213	213	134	2:07:52	2h 7m 31s 935ms	Lucy	Clark	f	Female 17-39		
214	214	179	2:07:55	2h 7m 42s 460ms	Mona	Schoonbee	f	Female 17-39		
215	215	112	2:07:57	2h 7m 31s 983ms	Helen	Harbrow	f	Female 50-59	Watford Joggers	
216	216	374	2:08:16	2h 8m 4s 421ms	Lisa	Porter	f	Female 40-49		
217	217	356	2:08:16	2h 8m 2s 710ms	John	Nicholson	m	Male 40-49		Parkrun pals
218	218	415	2:08:42	2h 8m 28s 328ms	Gary	Thirkettle	m	Male 40-49		
219	219	48	2:08:51	2h 8m 39s 531ms	Hayley	Clayton	f	Female 40-49	Farnham Runners	
220	220	255	2:08:52	2h 8m 42s 920ms	Heather	Scott	f	Female 17-39		
221	221	364	2:09:05	2h 8m 51s 390ms	Caroline	Terburgh	f	Female 40-49		
222	222	362	2:09:18	2h 9m 9s 461ms	Larissa	Rankin	f	Female 17-39		
223	223	366	2:09:18	2h 9m 9s 510ms	Sofia	Nicolle	f	Female 17-39		
224	224	210	2:09:36	2h 9m 28s 823ms	Elian	Williams	m	Male 17-39		
225	225	314	2:09:51	2h 9m 32s 404ms	Jenny	Brunton	f	Female 17-39		
226	226	319	2:09:51	2h 9m 32s 738ms	Alexandra	Schluep	f	Female 17-39		
227	227	148	2:10:28	2h 10m 2s 7ms	Karen	Cooper	f	Female 50-59		
228	228	147	2:10:28	2h 10m 2s 900ms	Richard	Cooper	m	Male 50-59		
229	229	367	2:10:45	2h 10m 34s 259ms	Samantha	Moir	f	Female 50-59		
230	230	305	2:11:30	2h 11m 21s 959ms	Izel	Smit	f	Female 17-39		
231	231	113	2:11:44	2h 11m 18s 395ms	Emma	Jeffrey	f	Female 40-49	Watford Joggers	
232	232	88	2:12:08	2h 11m 58s 427ms	Fiona	Stretton-Emerson	f	Female 40-49	Parkrun & Beyond	
233	233	17	2:12:37	2:12:37	Thomas	Hennessy	m	Male 50-59		
234	234	84	2:12:51	2h 12m 28s 734ms	Ali	Atkinson	f	Female 50-59	Avon Valley Runners	
235	235	197	2:13:14	2h 13m 1s 454ms	Peter	Monteiro	m	Male 17-39		
236	236	336	2:13:20	2h 13m 10s 347ms	Jennifer	Seymour	f	Female 50-59		
237	237	227	2:13:55	2h 13m 34s 126ms	Neil	Winton	m	Male 50-59	Felixstowe Road Runners	
238	238	279	2:14:09	2h 13m 43s 526ms	Deborah	Davies	f	Female 50-59	Loughton Athletic Club	
239	239	283	2:14:09	2h 13m 44s 110ms	Matthew	Richardson	m	Male 50-59	Kairos Arts	
240	240	500	2:14:32	2h 14m 16s 661ms	Cara	Malorey-Vibert	f	Female 17-39		
241	241	352	2:14:33	2h 14m 16s 944ms	Adrian	Attwell	m	Male 50-59		
242	242	332	2:14:34	2h 14m 10s 901ms	Helen	Hale	f	Female 40-49		
243	243	170	2:14:44	2h 14m 34s 568ms	Linda	Parrish	f	Female 50-59	Spartans	
244	244	169	2:14:44	2h 14m 22s 833ms	Stephen	Csaplar	m	Male 40-49		
245	245	122	2:14:57	2h 14m 33s 261ms	Nick	Slade	m	Male 50-59		
246	246	225	2:15:37	2h 15m 12s 426ms	Oliver	Catling	m	Male 17-39		
247	247	401	2:15:45	2h 15m 17s 417ms	Anna	Goodyear	f	Female 40-49		
248	248	380	2:16:16	2h 16m 7s 366ms	Margaret	Lewis	f	Female 50-59		
249	249	176	2:16:17	2h 16m 5s 304ms	Amy	Luus	f	Female 17-39		
250	250	226	2:16:17	2h 16m 4s 834ms	Annare	Dougherty	f	Female 17-39		
251	251	151	2:17:11	2h 16m 56s 421ms	Paul	Byrne	m	Male 60-69		
252	252	384	2:17:38	2h 17m 25s 392ms	Chris	Kali	m	Male 40-49		
253	253	198	2:18:08	2h 18m 0s 735ms	Steve	Martin	m	Male 50-59		
254	254	101	2:18:24	2h 18m 15s 832ms	Jennifer	Stretton	f	Female 40-49		
255	255	73	2:18:32	2h 18m 19s 815ms	Peter	Coleman	m	Male 60-69		
256	256	357	2:18:37	2h 18m 22s 717ms	Maryke	Harper	f	Female 17-39		
257	257	182	2:18:38	2h 18m 24s 293ms	Vicky	Barclay	f	Female 40-49		
258	258	77	2:20:03	2h 19m 45s 725ms	Alex	Johnston	f	Female 17-39		
259	259	341	2:20:33	2h 20m 17s 547ms	Samantha	North	f	Female 17-39		
260	260	416	2:20:34	2h 20m 18s 295ms	Triona	Danaher	f	Female 40-49		
261	261	154	2:21:12	2h 20m 48s 17ms	Sarah	Lewis	f	Female 17-39		
262	262	350	2:21:21	2h 21m 5s 523ms	Allan	Johnson	m	Male 70-79	Lincoln Lakeside	
263	263	22	2:21:22	2h 21m 3s 557ms	Stephen	Crowther	m	Male 60-69	Lliswerry	
264	264	100	2:21:31	2h 21m 14s 968ms	Megan	Hopper	f	Female 17-39		
265	265	105	2:21:31	2h 21m 14s 666ms	Vicky	Hopper	f	Female 50-59	Derwent Valley Trail Runners	
266	266	372	2:22:53	2h 22m 35s 148ms	Sue	Paton	f	Female 50-59		
267	267	56	2:24:46	2h 24m 24s 254ms	Megan	Purcell-Jones	f	Female 17-39		
268	268	57	2:24:46	2h 24m 24s 487ms	Elisa	Canas	f	Female 17-39		
269	269	191	2:25:54	2h 25m 26s 858ms	Mandy	Attree	f	Female 50-59	St Albans Striders	
270	270	190	2:25:54	2h 25m 26s 697ms	Lucy	Stern	f	Female 50-59	St Albans Striders	
271	271	193	2:25:54	2h 25m 26s 765ms	Carol	Ransom	f	Female 50-59	St Albans Striders	
272	272	203	2:26:05	2h 25m 43s 74ms	Gavin	Frost	m	Male 40-49	@jersey.runclub	
273	273	267	2:26:21	2h 26m 1s 900ms	Sheryl	Melling	f	Female 40-49		
274	274	71	2:26:35	2h 26m 8s 509ms	Cathy	Sara	f	Female 50-59		
275	275	75	2:26:35	2h 26m 8s 392ms	Angela	Nunn	f	Female 40-49		
276	276	263	2:27:09	2h 26m 43s 408ms	Michelle	Metcalfe	f	Female 50-59		
277	277	40	2:27:10	2h 26m 43s 175ms	Rebecca	Styles	f	Female 50-59	Stockport Harriers	
278	278	208	2:27:15	2h 26m 52s 362ms	Andrew	Gill	m	Male 17-39		
279	279	370	2:27:26	2h 27m 8s 652ms	Felicity	Robinson	f	Female 17-39		
280	280	297	2:27:26	2h 27m 8s 674ms	Angharad	Campbell	f	Female 17-39		
281	281	72	2:27:34	2h 27m 21s 542ms	Philip	Coleman	m	Male 50-59	North York Moors	
282	282	241	2:27:35	2h 27m 22s 994ms	Dominic	Coleman	m	Male 17-39		
283	283	215	2:27:39	2h 27m 21s 636ms	Nevine	Almanni	f	Female 40-49		
284	284	21	2:28:56	2h 28m 38s 538ms	Sonia	Watson	f	Female 50-59		
285	285	165	2:29:00	2h 28m 40s 576ms	Rod	Cooper	m	Male 60-69	Ripon Runners	
286	286	281	2:29:11	2h 28m 55s 344ms	Alastair	Gallichan	m	Male 17-39		
287	287	246	2:29:29	2h 29m 11s 443ms	Corrinne	Purdy	f	Female 40-49		
288	288	110	2:29:41	2h 29m 14s 699ms	Jackie	Clifft	f	Female 50-59	Watford Joggers	
289	289	386	2:30:30	2h 30m 13s 51ms	Darren	Maervoet	m	Male 50-59		
290	290	289	2:30:52	2h 30m 28s 415ms	Anna	Sabiston	f	Female 40-49		
291	291	121	2:31:41	2h 31m 16s 700ms	Kevin	Allen	m	Male 50-59		Parkrun Pals
292	292	166	2:34:26	2h 34m 16s 704ms	Geoffrey	Nott	m	Male 60-69	Jersey Spartans AC	
293	293	497	2:35:52	2h 35m 25s 118ms	Christine	Gibbons	f	Female 60-69	Arena 80	
294	294	114	2:36:49	2h 36m 22s 860ms	Kerry	Stock	f	Female 50-59	Watford Joggers	
295	295	109	2:40:25	2h 39m 58s 249ms	Claire	Fitzgerald	f	Female 50-59	Watford Joggers	
296	296	104	2:40:53	2h 40m 36s 872ms	Réka	Wilson	f	Female 17-39		
297	297	43	2:43:21	2h 43m 1s 416ms	Wendy	Jenkins	f	Female 40-49		
298	298	237	2:43:21	2h 42m 56s 466ms	Ashlea	Tracey	f	Female 17-39	Jersey Girls Run	
299	299	269	2:43:21	2h 42m 56s 800ms	Alison	Moss	f	Female 40-49	Jersey Girls Run	
300	300	63	2:45:28	2h 45m 4s 678ms	Sue	Lear	f	Female 50-59		
301	301	118	2:48:02	2h 47m 36s 535ms	Susan	Gaszczak	f	Female 50-59		Trentham Running Club
302	302	135	2:50:00	2h 49m 37s 501ms	Lynne	Shere	f	Female 50-59		
303	303	180	2:50:00	2h 49m 38s 554ms	Christine	McGowan	f	Female 50-59		
304	304	47	2:51:39	2h 51m 27s 286ms	Lisa	Hodgkinson	f	Female 50-59	Farnham Runners	
305	305	219	2:56:29	2h 56m 8s 848ms	Rebecca	Lesley	f	Female 17-39		
306	306	212	3:01:55	3:01:55	Stephen	Fitzpatrick	m	Male 17-39		
307	307	213	3:02:27	3h 1m 59s 275ms	Jolanie	Last	f	Female 17-39		

=== 2021 ===
Place Overall	Bib	Time	Name	M/F	Age Cat
1	118	01:16:29	Nick Mann	M	Male 40-49
2	183	01:19:34	Brenton Lee	M	Male 40-49
3	75	01:19:42	Will Dupre	M	Male 40-49
4	121	01:21:39	Rahul Kini	M	Male 17-39
5	31	01:22:38	Phil Ahier	M	Male 50-59
6	83	01:23:17	Jonny Amy	M	Male 17-39
7	174	01:24:18	Wayne Quenault	M	Male 17-39
8	133	01:25:36	Ashley Lewis	M	Male 17-39
9	5	01:26:18	Mick Siouville	M	Male 50-59
10	184	01:26:45	Alex Rafa	M	Male 17-39
11	67	01:27:23	Michael Anderson	M	Male 17-39
12	144	01:27:58	Peter Walker	M	Male 17-39
13	97	01:28:09	Ryan Couillard	M	Male 17-39
14	37	01:28:10	Hilario Mendes	M	Male 17-39
15	68	01:28:56	Christopher Bardsley	M	Male 17-39
16	137	01:29:15	Marius Twite	M	Male 40-49
17	141	01:29:43	Andrew Blake	M	Male 40-49
18	151	01:30:39	Adam Harris	M	Male 17-39
19	36	01:30:42	Richard Heap	M	Male 50-59
20	60	01:30:45	Chris Hall	M	Male 50-59
21	34	01:30:50	Ilidio Camacho	M	Male 40-49
22	176	01:31:21	Matthew Gambles	M	Male 50-59
23	30	01:33:17	Stephen Lehan-Port	M	Male 17-39
24	170	01:33:41	Alan Falle	M	Male 17-39
25	164	01:33:59	Fabio Andrade	M	Male 17-39
26	22	01:34:13	George Lumley	M	Male 17-39
27	129	01:34:40	Gerard Mooney	M	Male 40-49
28	39	01:36:05	Callum Rabet	M	Male 17-39
29	188	01:36:09	Marcelo Rodrigues	M	Male 50-59
30	126	01:36:18	James Michel	M	Male 50-59
31	124	01:36:26	Conor Bisson	M	Male 17-39
32	85	01:36:37	Adam Laffoley	M	Male 17-39
33	82	01:36:37	Terri Booth	F	Female 17-39
34	51	01:36:46	Lara James	F	Female 40-49
35	107	01:36:48	Stephen Ahier	M	Male 50-59
36	162	01:36:59	Jack Lewis	M	Male 17-39
37	54	01:37:08	Spencer Woolley	M	Male 50-59
38	198	01:37:52	Harry Mcalinden	M	Male 60-69
39	100	01:37:53	Ahmed Youssef	M	Male 40-49
40	105	01:37:55	Genesis Perez	M	Male 17-39
41	200	01:38:11	Virgilio Mendes	m	Male 40-49
42	199	01:38:24	Matt Ruane	M	Male 50-59
43	96	01:38:43	Harrison Marie	M	Male 17-39
44	119	01:38:54	Josh Vautier	M	Male 17-39
45	132	01:39:01	Michael Byrne	M	Male 40-49
46	146	01:39:40	Mike Fillery	M	Male 40-49
47	120	01:40:11	Victoria Stafford	F	Female 17-39
48	109	01:40:40	Mikus Eglitis	M	Male 17-39
49	90	01:40:50	Nicola Shaw	F	Female 40-49
50	26	01:41:02	Phil Faulkner	M	Male 40-49
51	189	01:41:20	Justin Lloyd-Jones	M	Male 50-59
52	145	01:41:39	Alexandra Farmer	F	Female 40-49
53	182	01:41:52	Mandy Evans	F	Female 50-59
54	154	01:41:52	John MacPherson	M	Male 40-49
55	138	01:42:32	David Wheatley	M	Male 50-59
56	102	01:42:54	Morgan Nathan	M	Male 17-39
57	192	01:42:54	Charlotte Manby	F	Female 17-39
58	4	01:43:16	Liam Armstrong	M	Male 17-39
59	42	01:43:24	Charlotte Turner	F	Female 17-39
60	45	01:44:05	Elizabeth Le Guillou	F	Female 50-59
61	44	01:44:20	Trevor Dearsley	M	Male 50-59
62	104	01:44:55	Emil Matute	M	Male 17-39
63	23	01:45:52	Danny Thorn	M	Male 40-49
64	136	01:45:53	Laurence Parkinson	M	Male 40-49
65	114	01:46:14	Howard O'Toole	M	Male 40-49
66	123	01:46:22	Darren De Freitas	M	Male 40-49
67	52	01:46:31	Natalie Dale	F	Female 17-39
68	61	01:46:33	Greg Morrison	M	Male 40-49
69	130	01:46:34	Bryce Alford	M	Male 50-59
70	6	01:46:39	Rob Benest	M	Male 50-59
71	86	01:46:49	Jason Hodgson	M	Male 50-59
72	49	01:47:19	Ben Young	M	Male 17-39
73	112	01:47:26	Francis Joven	M	Male 17-39
74	80	01:47:49	Jason Aspland	M	Male 50-59
75	171	01:48:14	Matthew Ecobichon	M	Male 40-49
76	193	01:48:24	Daniel Luwum	M	Male 17-39
77	153	01:49:46	Pedram Padidar	M	Male 40-49
78	10	01:50:04	Michael Lempriere	M	Male 60-69
79	191	01:50:36	Wayne English	M	Male 40-49
80	48	01:50:42	Ian Roff	M	Male 17-39
81	194	01:50:46	Emily Le Beuvant	F	Female 17-39
82	73	01:51:07	Harriet Taylor	F	Female 17-39
83	135	01:52:04	Bob Hurst	M	Male 70-79
84	13	01:52:06	Henry Cornish	M	Male 17-39
85	88	01:52:28	Tom Stead	M	Male 17-39
86	163	01:52:49	Chris Lewis	M	Male 50-59
87	79	01:53:01	Victoria Doleman	F	Female 17-39
88	63	01:53:09	Daniel Walker	M	Male 17-39
89	187	01:53:22	Paul Farrer	M	Male 17-39
90	55	01:53:35	Helen Day	F	Female 40-49
91	20	01:53:48	Michal Spiewak	M	Male 40-49
92	11	01:54:15	Robert Rumfitt	M	Male 40-49
93	165	01:54:30	John Garnier	M	Male 50-59
94	3	01:55:03	Mohammed Alamin	M	Male 17-39
95	76	01:55:11	Shaun Heslop	M	Male 40-49
96	72	01:55:34	Julie Linton	F	Female 17-39
97	16	01:55:43	Elliot Mansell	M	Male 40-49
98	155	01:55:55	Penny Francisco	F	Female 40-49
99	66	01:56:01	Matthew Taylor	M	Male 40-49
100	69	01:56:15	Giulia Viavattene	F	Female 17-39
101	1	01:56:26	Stephen McGinness	M	Male 17-39
102	77	01:57:03	Gary Thirkettle	M	Male 40-49
103	179	01:57:32	Adrian Gordon	M	Male 50-59
104	173	01:57:47	Christopher Chambers	M	Male 40-49
105	128	01:59:19	Sharon Bosio	F	Female 40-49
106	27	01:59:20	Roy McCarthy	M	Male 60-69
107	172	02:00:03	Bradley Chambers	M	Male 40-49
108	116	02:01:01	Carl von Bratt	M	Male 17-39
109	117	02:01:01	Tamara von Bratt	F	Female 17-39
110	190	02:01:07	Kimberley Clifton	F	Female 40-49
111	186	02:02:22	Adam Blampied	M	Male 17-39
112	185	02:02:23	Danny Richardson	M	Male 17-39
113	157	02:02:27	Colin Harrison	M	Male 50-59
114	92	02:02:33	Glen Boschat	M	Male 17-39
115	181	02:03:38	Lucy Clark	F	Female 17-39
116	140	02:03:49	Jerome Taylor	M	Male 60-69
117	142	02:03:54	Lauren Gray	F	Female 17-39
118	9	02:04:24	Elaine Brady	F	Female 40-49
119	25	02:04:26	Keith Galvin	M	Male 50-59
120	101	02:04:51	Jennifer Seymour	F	Female 40-49
121	122	02:05:18	Stuart Moseley	M	Male 50-59
122	41	02:05:51	Libby Ellis-Brecknell	F	Female 17-39
123	113	02:06:36	Mark Sanchez	M	Male 17-39
124	70	02:06:37	Katie Hawkshaw	F	Female 17-39
125	7	02:06:46	Joan Inwood	F	Female 50-59
126	161	02:07:05	Margaret Lewis	F	Female 50-59
127	147	02:07:36	Bénédicte Guinard	F	Female 17-39
128	167	02:09:09	Michelle Moore	F	Female 17-39
129	64	02:09:20	Catherine Morris	F	Female 17-39
130	91	02:10:06	Michelle Stearn	F	Female 50-59
131	93	02:10:07	Georgia Chinn	F	Female 17-39
132	12	02:10:30	Ashley O'Connell	F	Female 17-39
133	108	02:10:36	Sam Wilkes	M	Male 17-39
134	47	02:10:59	Gemma Tilly	F	Female 17-39
135	50	02:10:59	Laura MacDonald	F	Female 17-39
136	180	02:12:56	Eilish Brenock	F	Female 50-59
137	40	02:13:22	Paul Byrne	M	Male 50-59
138	159	02:14:08	Helena Abreu	F	Female 17-39
139	148	02:15:03	Kate Mccaffrey	F	Female 17-39
140	149	02:15:03	Alexandra Schluep	F	Female 17-39
141	168	02:15:44	Andrew Holmes	M	Male 50-59
142	58	02:17:03	Sue Paton	F	Female 50-59
143	65	02:17:24	Steven Holley	M	Male 50-59
144	78	02:18:38	Diana Hey	F	Female 17-39
145	175	02:18:49	Tanya Chinn	F	Female 50-59
146	169	02:21:06	Gareth Wheatley	M	Male 17-39
147	158	02:23:39	Carla Garnier	F	Female 17-39
148	110	02:25:29	Geoffrey Nott	M	Male 60-69
149	17	02:25:50	Debby Parkinson	F	Female 50-59
150	38	02:32:28	Jen Smith	F	Female 17-39
151	2	02:44:14	Petra Obalova	F	Female 40-49
152	29	02:44:29	Liz Fennell	F	Female 60-69
153	28	02:49:21	Julie De La Haye	F	Female 60-69

=== 2012 ===
Men

- 2012 — Mavny Thomas → 1:15:24

Women

- 2012 — Jo Gorrod → 1:22:59

== See also ==
- Jersey Marathon
- JSAC Half Marathon
