= JSAC Half Marathon =

Annual half-marathon in Jersey, Channel Islands

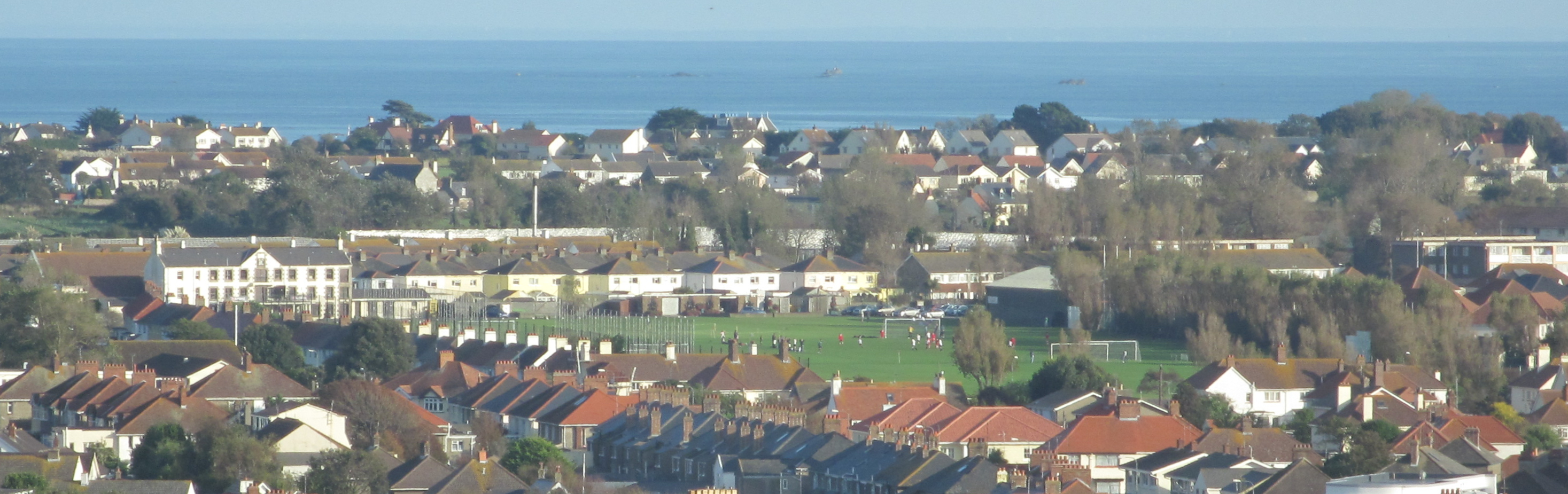
- FB Fields.
- Date: December
- Location: Jersey, Channel Islands
- Event type: Road
- Distance: Half marathon
- Course records: Men: Women:
- Website: www.jerseyspartan.com/jersey-half-marathon

The JSAC Jersey Half Marathon (currently known as "The Modern Hotels Jersey Half Marathon") is an annual half marathon staged in Jersey, Channel Islands. It is organised by the Jersey Spartan Athletics Club.

== History ==
The 2011 event was held on 20 November 2011 as well as 17th of 2013.

== The course ==
The course starts and finishes at FB Fields in St. Clement, Jersey, and is set out over the east of the island.

== See also ==
- Jersey Marathon
- Jersey Half Marathon
