= Jersey Basketball Association =

Governing body of basketball in Jersey

- Current season, competition or edition: 2019-20
- Sport: Basketball
- President: Robert Honey
- Venue(s): Fort Regent, Langford sports centre, Oakfield sports centre
- Official website: basketball.je

Jersey Basketball Association (JBBA) is the governing body of the sport of basketball in Jersey. The Jersey Basketball Association facilitates competitive opportunities for the sport and has U17, U21, Men's and Women's teams that represent the Island of Jersey.

The teams have been playing in an annual Inter Insular match against Guernsey Basketball since 1970 where each Island takes turn to host.

The Jersey Basketball Association has put forward representative teams to play in the Natwest International Island Games

== History ==
Jersey Men's Team have played in the following Island Games

- 2015 Island Games in Jersey
- 2017 Island Games in Gotland placing 7th out of 11 teams
- 2019 Island Games in Gibraltar placing 7th out of 11 teams

Jersey Women's Team have played in the following Island Games

- 2015 Island Games in Jersey placing 7th out f 7 teams
- 2017 Island Games in Gotland placing 7th out of 7 teams
- 2019 Island Games in Gibraltar playing 7th out of 7 teams
- 2023 Island Games in Guernsey placing 6th out of 6 teams

== See also ==
- International Island Games Association
