= Jersey Marathon =

Annual race in Jersey held since 2006

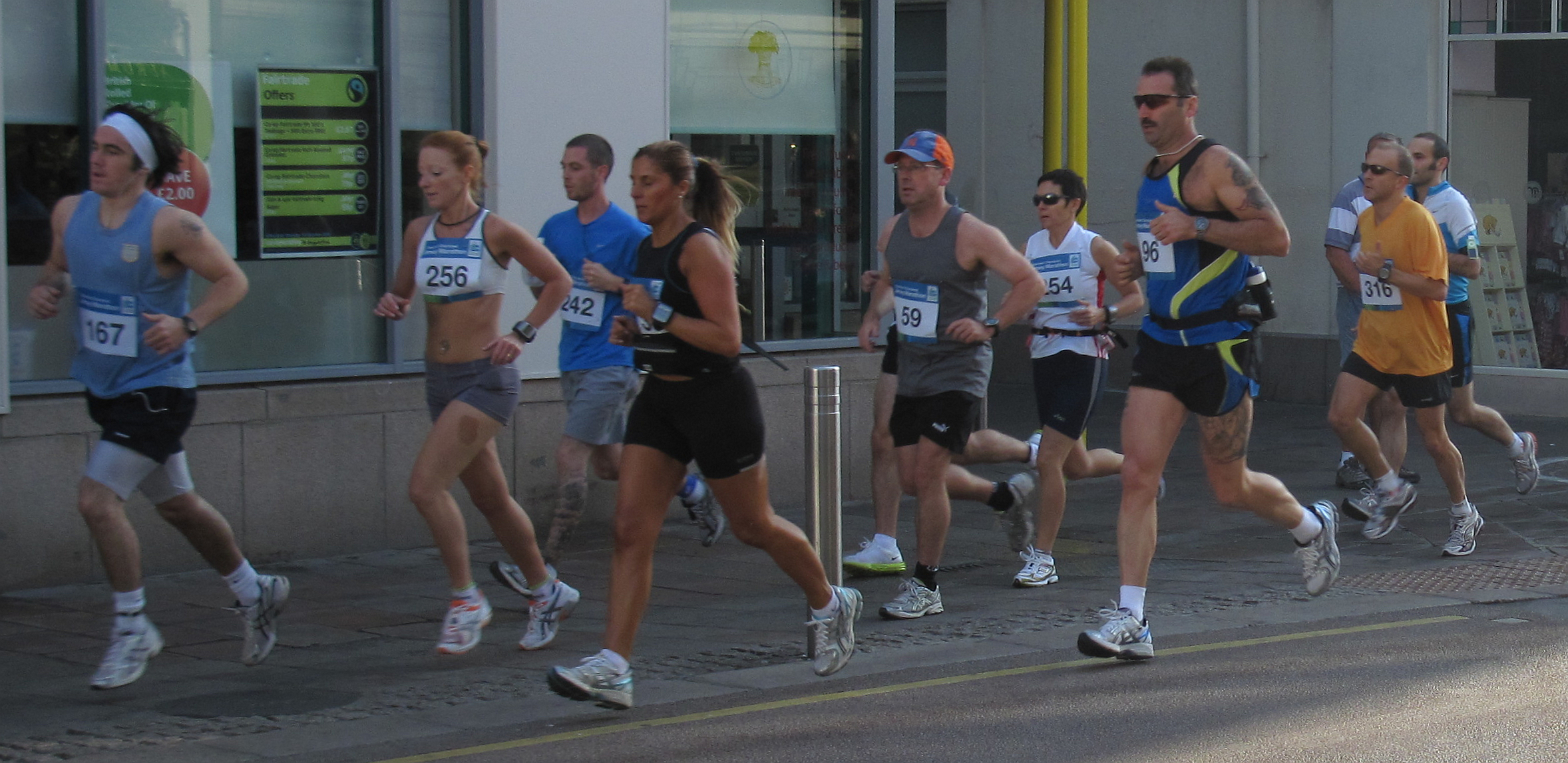
- Participants run through the town in 2009.
- Date: September or October
- Location: Jersey, Channel Islands
- Event type: Road
- Distance: Marathon
- Established: October 8, 2006 (20 years ago)
- Course records: Men: 2:16:03 (Nathan Kioko, 2023); Women: 2:44:33 (Svetlana Pretot, 2013)
- Website: www.jersey-marathon.com
- 2026 Jersey Marathon

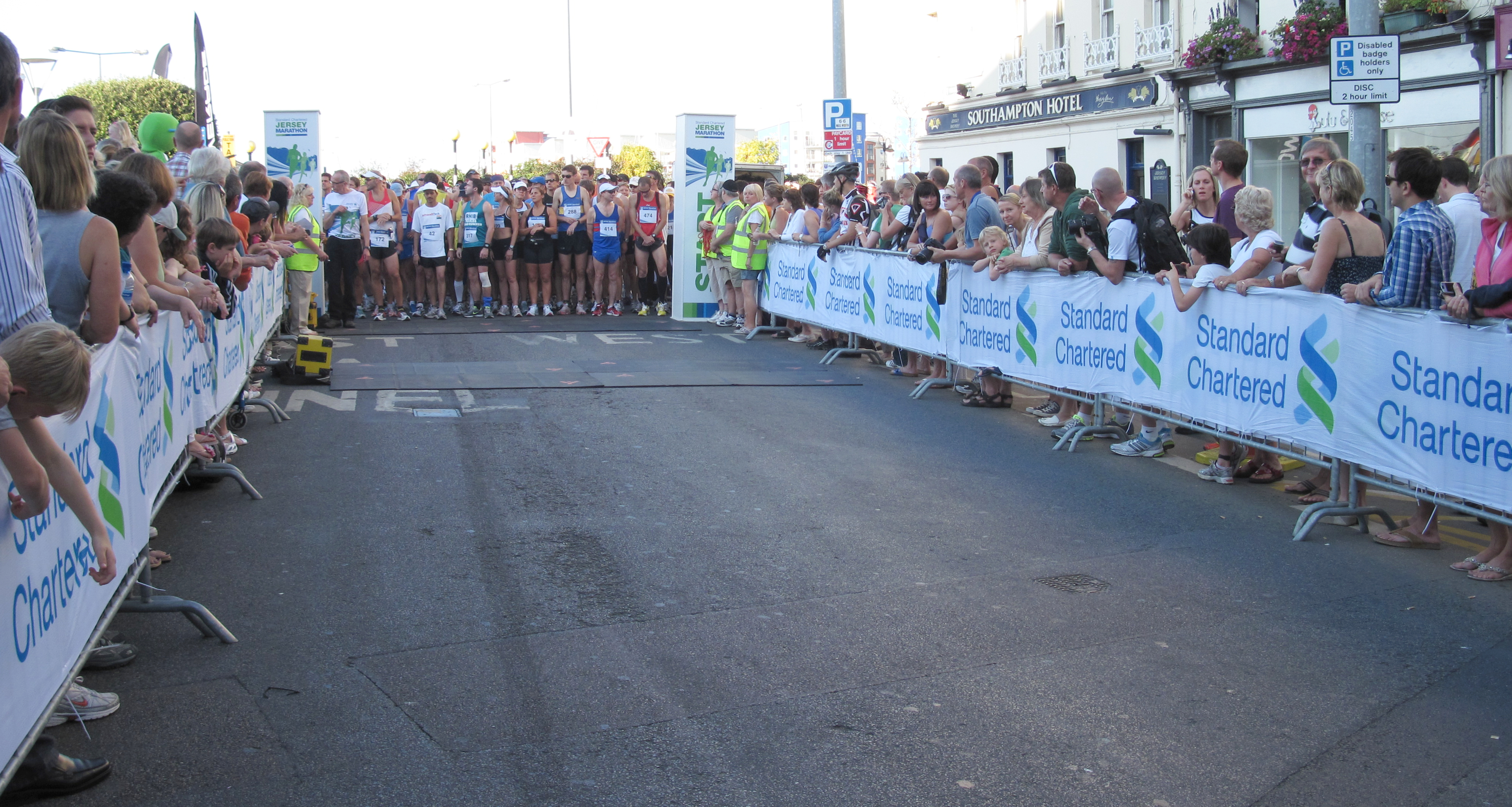
Start line in 2011

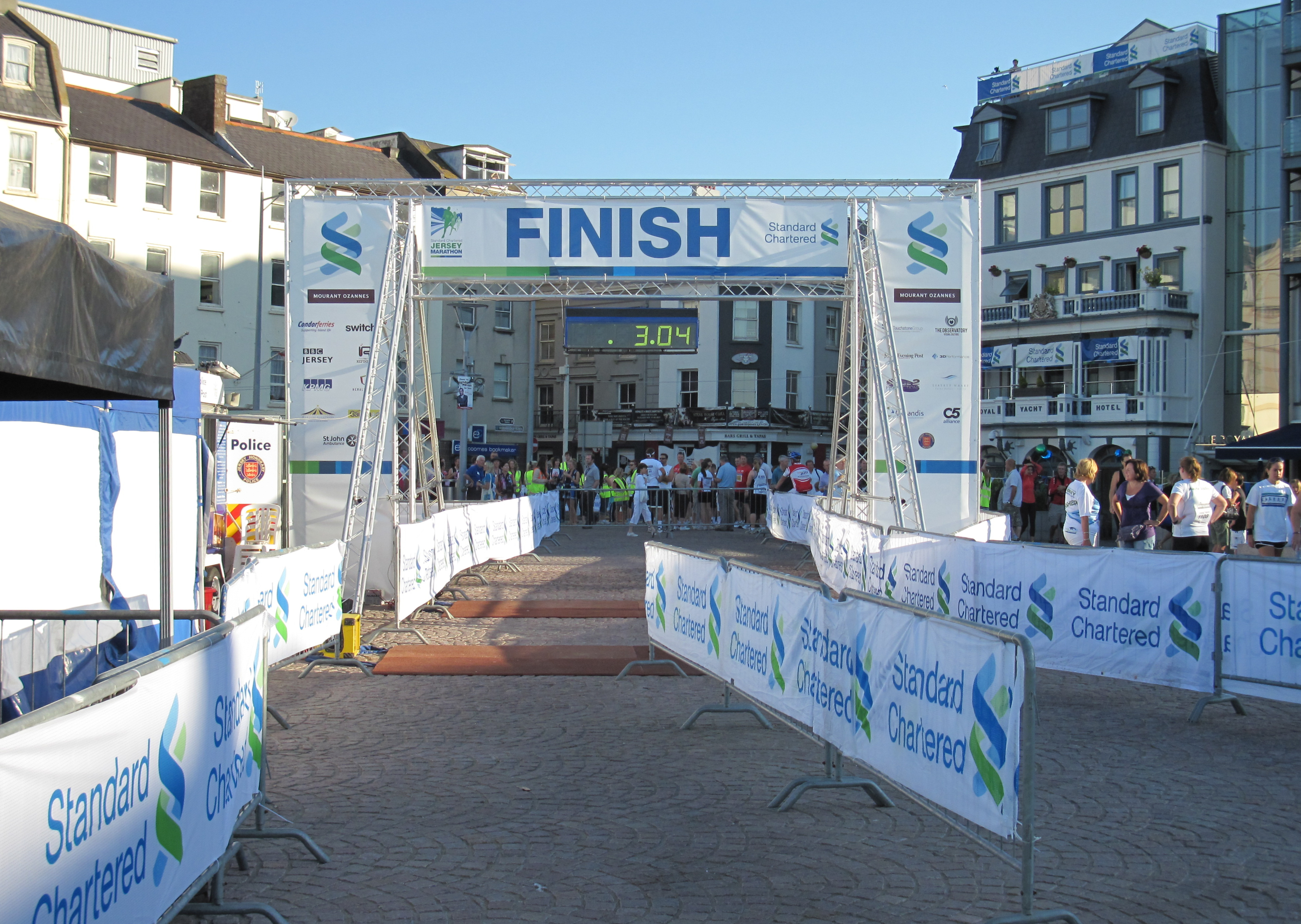
Finish line in 2011

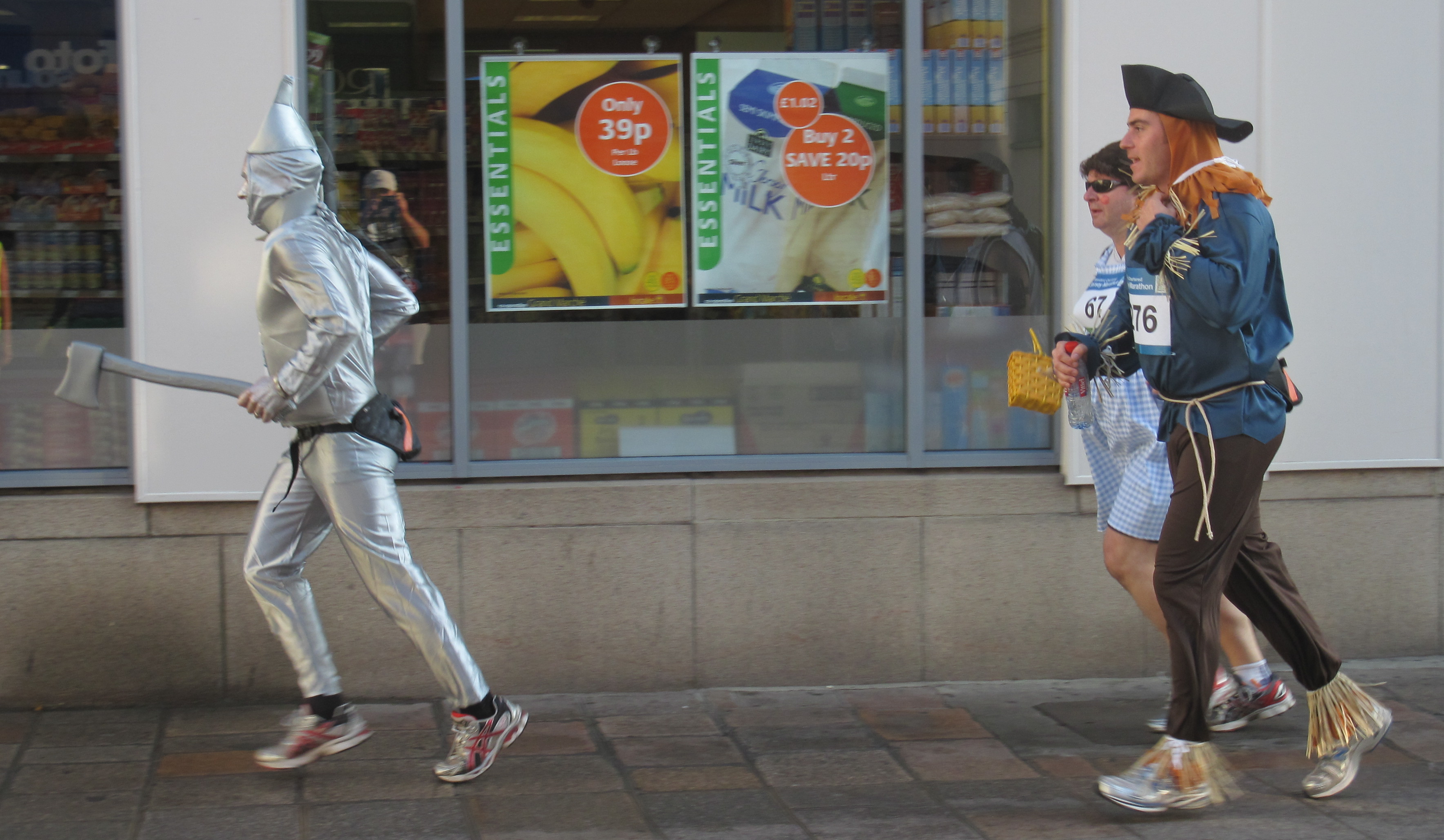
Runners in costume in 2009

The Standard Chartered Jersey Marathon is an annual marathon staged in Jersey, Channel Islands, first held in 2006.

== History ==
The inaugural event on 8 October 2006 was the first marathon staged in Jersey for 20 years. It attracted approximately 300 runners, and was won by Garry Payne in a time of 2:44:32.

The 2011 marathon attracted over 300 off-island runners, and saw 352 finishers in the main event.

The 2020 in-person edition of the race was cancelled due to the coronavirus pandemic, with all entries automatically transferred to 2021.

== Course ==
The course starts and finishes at Weighbridge Place, Saint Helier, and is set out over the town streets, central, north and west of the island.

== Winners ==
Key: Course record

Ed.	Year	Date	Men's winner	Time	Women's winner	Time	Rf.
17	2023	Oct 1	Nathan Kioko	2:16:03	Antoinette Kyriacou	3:03:49	
16	2022	Oct 2	Bosuben Benard Kipkemoi	2:21:09	Lydia Wafula	2:45:02	
15	2021	Oct 3	Evan Laframboise	2:54:19	Stephanie Henwood-Darts	3:23:17	
	2020	cancelled due to coronavirus pandemic					
14	2019	Oct 6	Barnabas Kipyego	2:17:09	Edna Jeruto	2:45:45	
13	2018	Oct 7	Dan Tanui	2:19:34	Khrystyna Bohomiahkova	2:48:46	
12	2017	Oct 1	Hillary Chirchir	2:22:32	Ulrike Maisch	2:57:28	
11	2016	Oct 2	Christopher Zablocki	2:19:55	Nollaigh O'Neill	3:01:48	
10	2015	Oct 4	Aleksey Troshkin	2:18:13	Hilda Cheboi	2:48:25	
9	2014	Oct 5	Aleksey Troshkin	2:18:32	Getenesh Tamirat	2:47:48	
8	2013	Oct 6	Reuben Chumba	2:24:23	Svetlana Pretot	2:44:33	
7	2012	Oct 7	Tomas Abyu	2:24:43	Shona Crombie-Hicks	2:53:36	
6	2011	Oct 2	Jethro Lennox	2:32:05	Shona Crombie-Hicks	2:53:36	
5	2010	Oct 3	Jan Pichl	2:31:30	Claire Forbes	2:57:18	
4	2009	Sep 27	Joseph Kibunja	2:33:29	Claire Forbes	3:00:02	
3	2008	Oct 5	Andrew Hennessey	2:29:05	Jo Gorrod	2:58:44	
2	2007	Oct 7	Andrew Hennessey	2:36:45	Michelle Buckle	3:04:11	
1	2006	Oct 8	Garry Payne	2:44:32	Michelle Buckle	3:03:48	

== See also ==
- Jersey Half Marathon
- JSAC Half Marathon
