= European Table Tennis Union =

Table tennis governing body in Europe

- Sport: Table Tennis
- Membership: 58
- Abbreviation: ETTU
- Founded: 1957
- Affiliation: ITTF
- Headquarters: Luxembourg City
- President: Pedro Moura

Official website
- ettu.org

The European Table Tennis Union (ETTU) is the governing body of the sport of table tennis in Europe, and is the only authority recognised for this purpose by the International Table Tennis Federation. The ETTU deals with all matters relating to table tennis at a European level, including the development and promotion of the sport in the territories controlled by its 58 member associations, and the organisation of continental table tennis competitions, including the European Championships.

== History ==
Following their decision to make the World Table Tennis Championships a biennial event from 1957 onwards, the International Table Tennis Federation (ITTF) invited the separate European table tennis associations to consider holding a European Championships in the intervening, even-numbered years. At a meeting on 13 March 1957 in Stockholm during that year's World Championships, the European Table Tennis Union (ETTU) was created by the associations of Austria, Belgium, Bulgaria, Czechoslovakia, East Germany, Finland, France, Hungary, Luxembourg, Netherlands, Portugal, Spain, Sweden, the USSR, Wales, West Germany and Yugoslavia. A board of seven was elected, including Frenchman Jean Belot as the first chairman, and the first European Championships took place in Budapest in 1958.

At a meeting in 1960, the ETTU decided to introduce a competition for European club teams, and the first European Club Cup of Champions for men took place in early 1961, with a women's event added three years later. In 1964, the ETTU assumed responsibility for youth competitions in Europe, and in 1970 the main competition for youth players was renamed the European Youth Championships. An experimental classification tournament was held in 1971, featuring the top twelve-ranked European players in a round robin-style competition. This event would go on to be held annually as the Europe Top-12.

In 1984, Nancy Evans retired from her role as Honorary General Secretary, having held that role for 27 years since the formation of the ETTU. In recognition of her outstanding service, she was appointed as the ETTU's first Honorary Life Member.

Between 1991 and 1995, the number of ETTU member associations increased dramatically from 37 to 52, largely due to applications from table tennis associations of nations that were formerly part of the USSR or Yugoslavia, in addition to the dissolution of Czechoslovakia. In 1998, the European Champions League was created for men's club teams (a women's Champions League followed in 2005), and in 1999, the ETTU entered into their first TV contract with ITTF/TMS, which enabled Champions League matches to be broadcast live on Eurosport.

In 2000, a decision was taken to switch the European Championships to odd-numbered years from 2003 onwards. This was in response to the ITTF's decision to start holding World Championships every year, alternating between individual events in odd-numbered years and team events in even-numbered years. From 2007, the European Championships became an annual event, and from 2016, the Championships will feature singles and doubles events in even-numbered years, with team events in odd-numbered years.

Following the 2022 Russian invasion of Ukraine, the ETTU Executive Board banned Russian and Belarusian players and officials from ETTU events, in accord with the recommendations of the International Olympic Committee (IOC), and in March 2022 its Russian president Igor Levitin self-suspended himself.

Following Igor Levitin's self-suspension, Deputy President Pedro Moura assumed the role of Acting President. At the ETTU Congress held in Linz, Austria, in October 2024, Moura was elected as president.

== Member Associations ==
The 58 member associations of the ETTU as of September 2022, include:

- Albania - Albanian Table Tennis Federation
- Andorra - Fédéració Andorrana de Tenis de Taula
- Armenia - Armenian Table Tennis Federation
- Austria - Österreichischer Tisch-Tennis Verband
- Azerbaijan - Azerbaijan Table Tennis Federation
- Belarus - Belarus Table Tennis Federation (players and officials banned from events)
- Belgium - Fédération Royale Belge de Tennis de Table
- (Bosnia and Herzegovina) Bosnia-Herzegovina - Table Tennis Federation of Bosnia-Herzegovina
- Bulgaria - Bulgarian Table Tennis Federation
- Croatia - Croatian Table Tennis Association
- Cyprus - Cyprus Table Tennis Association
- Czech Republic - Czech Table Tennis Association
- Denmark - Danish Table Tennis Association
- England - Table Tennis England
- Estonia - Estonian Table Tennis Association
- Faroe Islands - Bordtennisamband Foroya
- Finland - Finnish Table Tennis Association
- France - Fédération Française de Tennis de Table
- Georgia - Table Tennis Federation of Georgia
- Germany - Deutscher Tischtennis-Bund
- Gibraltar - Gibraltar Table Tennis Association
- Greece - Hellenic Table Tennis Association
- Greenland - Greenland Table Tennis Federation
- Guernsey - Guernsey Table Tennis Association
- Hungary - Hungarian Table Tennis Association
- Iceland - Icelandic Table Tennis Association
- Ireland - Irish Table Tennis Association
- Isle of Man - Isle of Man Table Tennis Association
- Israel - Israeli Table Tennis Association
- Italy - Italian Table Tennis Federation
- Jersey - Jersey Table Tennis Association
- Kosovo - Table Tennis Federation of Kosovo
- Latvia - Table Tennis Federation of Latvia
- Liechtenstein - Liechtensteiner Tischtennisverband
- Lithuania - Lithuanian Table Tennis Federation
- Luxembourg - Fédération Luxembourgeoise de Tennis de Table
- North Macedonia - Macedonian Table Tennis Association
- Malta - Malta Table Tennis Association
- Moldova - Moldova Table Tennis Federation
- Monaco - Fédération Monégasque de Tennis de Table
- Montenegro - Table Tennis Association of Montenegro
- Netherlands - Nederlandse Tafeltennisbond
- Norway - Norges Bordtennisforbund
- Poland - Polish Table Tennis Federation
- Portugal - Federação Portuguesa de Ténis de Mesa
- Romania - Federația Română de Tenis de Masă
- Russia - Table Tennis Federation of Russia (players and officials banned from events)
- San Marino - Federazione Sammarinese Tennistavolo
- Scotland - Table Tennis Scotland
- Serbia - Table Tennis Association of Serbia
- Slovakia - Slovak Table Tennis Association
- Slovenia - Slovenian Table Tennis Association
- Spain - Real Federación Espanola de Tenis de Mesa
- Sweden - Swedish Table Tennis Association
- Switzerland - Swiss Table Tennis Federation
- Turkey - Turkish Table Tennis Federation
- Ukraine - Ukraine Table Tennis Federation
- Wales - Table Tennis Association of Wales

== Competitions ==
The ETTU authorises the following competitions:

=== Nations ===
- European Championships – held since 1958, and annually since 2007; the main continental championships featuring singles, doubles and team events
- Europe Top 16 – held annually since 1971; features Europe's top 16 players, with the top three finishers guaranteed a place at the World Cup.
- European Under-21 Championships – new event for under-21 players, held for the first time in 2017
- European Youth Championships – held annually since 1955; the main continental championships for junior (under-18) and cadet (under-15) players
- Europe Youth Top 10 – held annually since 1985; features Europe's top 10 junior (under-18) and top 10 cadet (under-15) players.
- Euro-Asia Cup – alternated between Europe and Asia from 2009 until 2012; authorised by the ATTU and held annually in China since 2013
- European Games – singles and team events held as part of the European Games, every four years from 2015 onwards
- European Olympic Qualification Tournament – held in Olympic years to determine European qualifiers for Olympic Games singles events
- European Veterans' Championships – held in odd-numbered years since 1995, with competitions in eight different age categories
- European Para Table Tennis Championships
- Europaliga since 1967/68 to 2002/03.
- European Nations Cup (Men) since 1991 to 1998.
- European Nations Cup (Women) since 1994 to 2000.
- European Masters Cup since 1991 to 1999.
- Euro Super Cup.
- European U13 Championship since 2023.
- European Games.

=== Clubs ===
- European Champions League – replaced the European Club Cup of Champions (see below) as the most important international club competition in Europe; the men's competition has been held annually since 1998/99, with the women's competition held annually since 2005/06.
- ETTU Cup – the second tier international club competition in Europe; the men's competition has been held annually since 1964/65, with the women's competition starting one year later.
- European Club Cup of Champions (defunct) – former club competition, replaced by the European Champions League; the men's competition was held annually from 1960/61 until 2000/01, with the women's competition held annually from 1963/64 until 2004/05
- ETTU Europe Trophy is the third most important continental tournament for clubs in European table tennis, after the European Champions League and the ETTU Cup since 2022.

== Hall of Fame ==
In September 2015, the ETTU introduced the European Table Tennis Hall of Fame, with the aim of honouring champions, legendary players and other individuals who have made exceptional contributions to the sport of table tennis in Europe.

=== Inductees ===
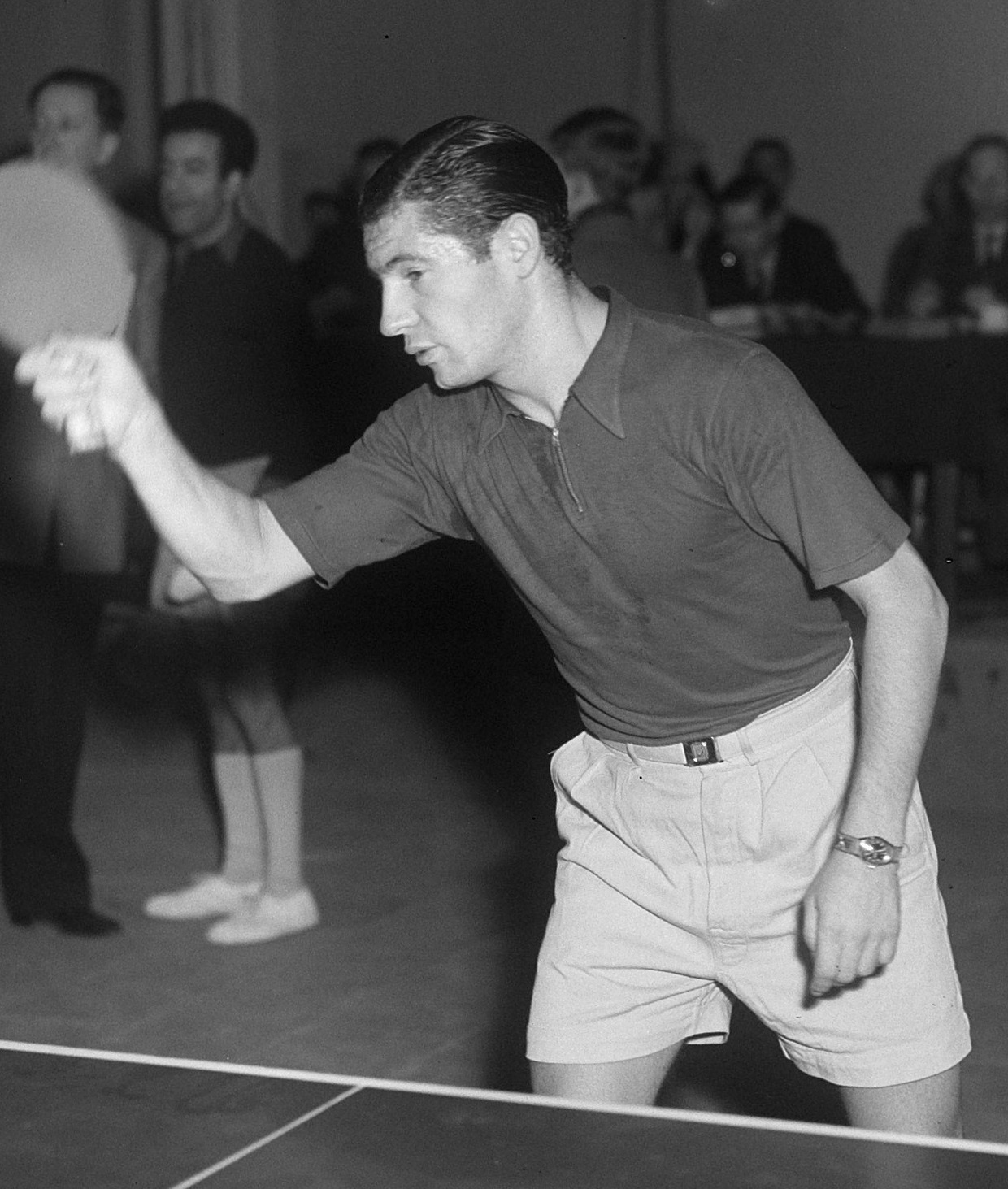
Richard Bergmann

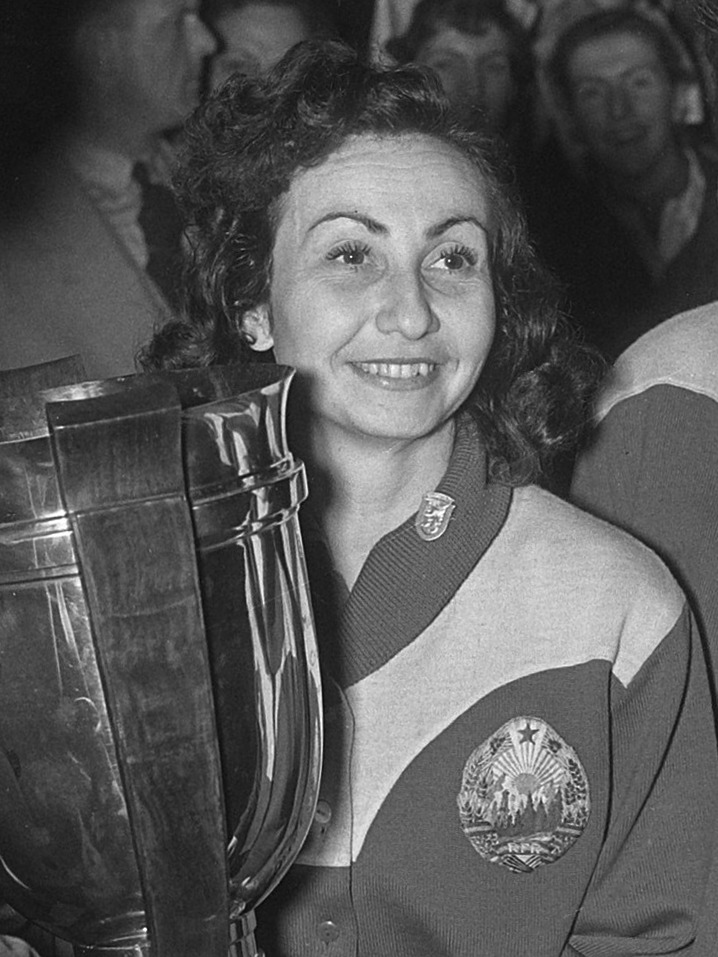
Angelica Rozeanu

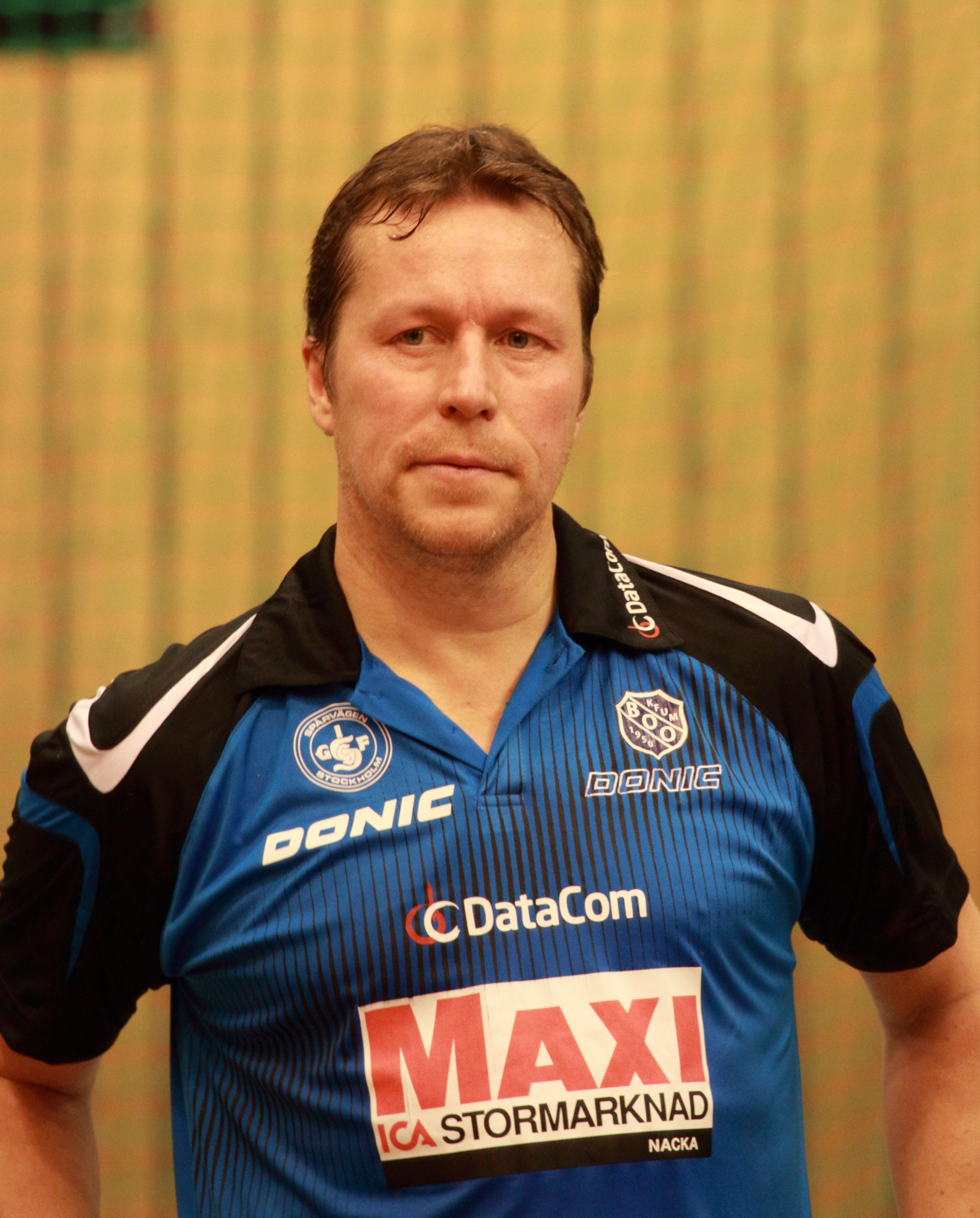
Jan-Ove Waldner

The following people have been inducted into the Hall of Fame:

2015

- Maria Alexandru
- Mikael Appelgren
- Otilia Bădescu
- Viktor Barna
- Csilla Bátorfi
- Stellan Bengtsson
- Zoltán Berczik
- Richard Bergmann
- Tamara Boroš
- Fliura Bulatova
- Gizi Farkas
- Jean-Philippe Gatien
- Gábor Gergely
- Andrzej Grubba
- Jill Hammersley
- Marie Hrachová
- Kjell Johansson
- István Jónyer
- Tibor Klampár
- Éva Kóczián
- Johnny Leach
- Judit Magos
- Mária Mednyánszky
- Jörgen Persson
- Valentina Popova
- Gertrude Pritzi
- Jörg Roßkopf
- Angelica Rozeanu
- Zoja Rudnova
- Werner Schlager
- Eberhard Schöler
- Ferenc Sidó
- Dragutin Šurbek
- Bettine Vriesekoop
- Jan-Ove Waldner
- Ella Zeller-Constantinescu

2016

- Hans Alsér
- Žarko Dolinar
- Marie Kettnerová
- Fred Perry
- Jean-Michel Saive
- Diane Schöler
- Agnes Simon
- Anna Sipos
- Bohumil Váňa

2017

- Vlasta Depetrisová
- Roland Jacobi
- Jacques Secrétin
- Nicole Struse

2019

- Peter Karlsson
- Li Jiao
- Antun Stipančić

== See also ==
- Asian Table Tennis Union
