= Jersey Spartan Athletics Club =

British athletics club

- Ground: FB Fields; Jersey

The Jersey Spartan Athletics Club or JSAC is an athletics club based in Jersey, at the FB Playing Fields, in St. Clement. The club is affiliated with UK Athletics, and Amateur Athletic Association of England.

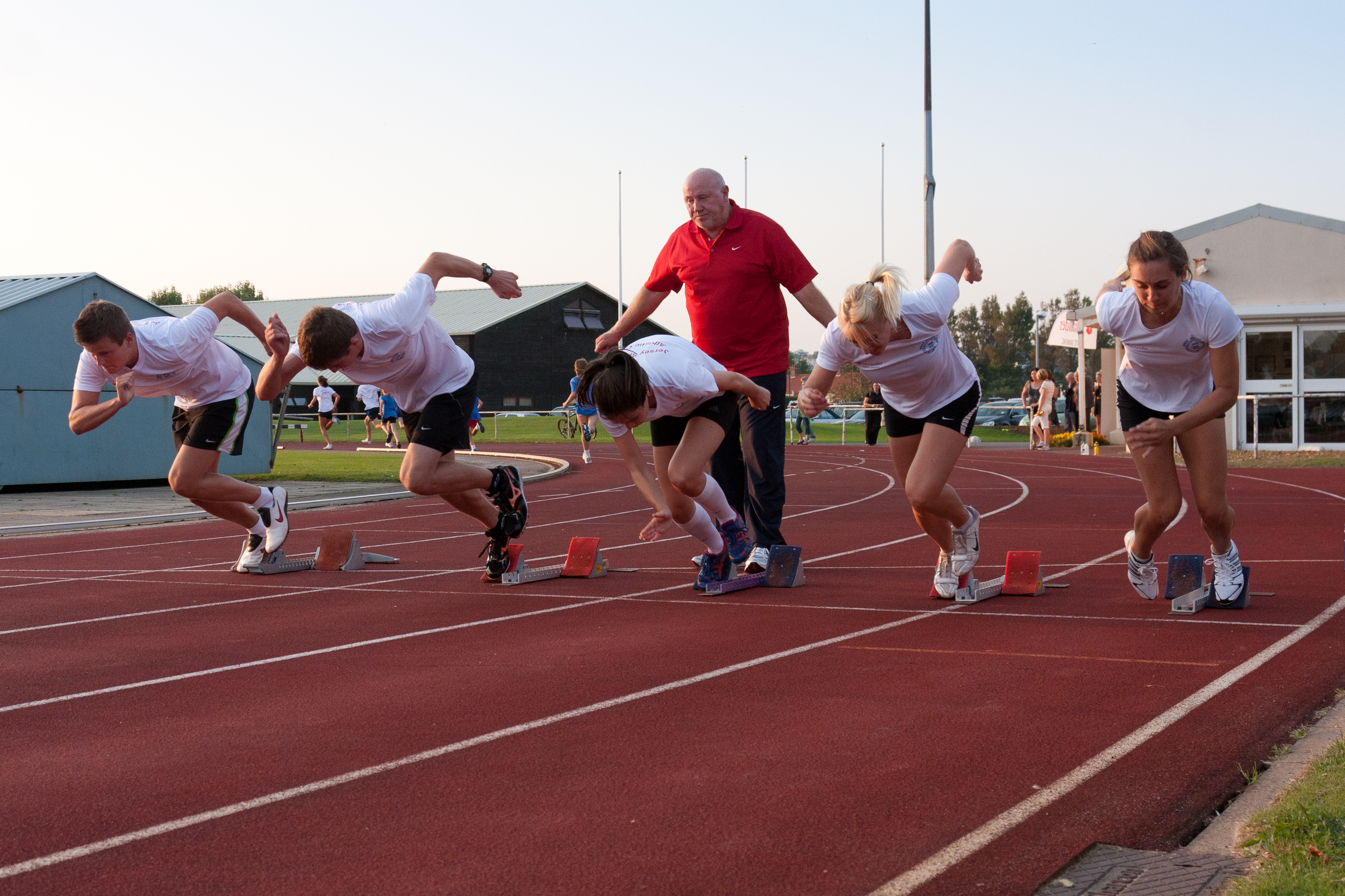
Members of the club demonstrate a race start on 1 September 2011.

== History ==
=== 2009 ===
Club junior Oliver Terry won a gold medal at the inter-counties cross-country and world trials in Nottingham on 7 March 2009.

=== 2012 ===
Sam Firby, former cycling competitor in the Commonwealth Games, won the "JSAC Fitness First Spring 10k race" on 5 April 2012.

== See also ==
- JSAC Half Marathon
