= International Table Tennis Federation =

International table tennis governing body

Coordinates: 46.532134°N 6.595596°E

- Abbreviation: ITTF
- Formation: 12 December 1926; 99 years ago
- Founder: Ivor Montagu & William Henry Lawes
- Founded at: London, United Kingdom
- Type: Sports federation
- Headquarters: Lausanne, Switzerland
- Members: 227 member associations
- President: Petra Sörling
- Website: ittf.com; ipttc.org

The International Table Tennis Federation (ITTF) is the governing body for national table tennis associations that use ITTF-approved sponge table tennis rackets. The federation oversees rules and regulations, seeks technological improvement for the sport, and organizes numerous international competitions, including the World Table Tennis Championships.

== Founding history ==
The ITTF was co-founded by Ivor Montagu and William Henry Lawes. It was established in Berlin in January 1926 and in London in December of that year. The nine founding members being Austria, Czechoslovakia, Denmark, England, Germany, Hungary, British India, Sweden, and Wales. The first international tournament was held in January 1926 in Berlin, while the first World Table Tennis Championships was held in December 1926 in London.

Toward the end of 2000, the ITTF instituted several rules changes aimed at making table tennis more viable as a televised spectator sport. The older 38 mm balls were officially replaced by 40 mm balls. This increased the ball's air resistance, and effectively slowed down the game. In 2003, the ITTF moved its headquarters from Hastings to Lausanne and set the ITTF Museum there.

In 2007, the governance for para table tennis was transferred from the International Paralympic Committee to the ITTF. In February 2008, the ITTF announced several rules changes after an ITTF Executive Meeting in Guangzhou, Guangdong, China with regards to a player's eligibility to play for a new association. The new ruling was to encourage associations to develop their own players.

In 2019, the ITTF created its subsidiary World Table Tennis (WTT) to manage all its commercial and events business. The ITTF's current headquarters are located in Lausanne while their Asia-Pacific office is based in Singapore and search for a new site for headquarters is in the process. The current president is Petra Sörling from Sweden. Sörling became the eighth person to hold the office in 2021.

List of ITTF presidents
President	Country	Presidency
Ivor Montagu	England	1926–1937 (as chairman); 1937–1967 (as president)
Roy Evans	Wales	1967–1987
Ichiro Ogimura	Japan	1987–1994
Lollo Hammarlund	Sweden	1994–1995
Xu Yinsheng	China	1995–1999
Adham Sharara	Canada	1999–2014
Thomas Weikert	Germany	2014–2021
Petra Sörling	Sweden	2021–

== Membership ==
The ITTF recognises five continental federations. There are currently 227 member associations within the ITTF.

Continent	Members	Continental federation
Africa	54	African Table Tennis Federation
America	46	Pan American Table Tennis Confederation
Asia	45	Asian Table Tennis Union (ATTU)
Europe	58	European Table Tennis Union (ETTU)
Oceania	24	Oceania Table Tennis Federation (OTTF)

== Organisational structure ==
All member associations of the ITTF attend annual general meeting (AGM). Agendas on changes of the constitution, laws of table tennis, applications for membership etc. are discussed and finalised through votes. Also, the president of ITTF, 8 executive vice-presidents, and 32 or less continental representatives are elected at an AGM, serving for a four-year term. The president, executive vice-presidents, and the chairman of the athletes' commission compose executive committee.

The executive committee, continental representatives and presidents of the five continental federations or their appointees compose the board of directors (Board). The Board manages the work of the ITTF between AGMs. Several committees, commissions, working groups or panels work under the constitution of ITTF or under the Board.

== Role in diplomacy ==
Unlike the organisations for more popular sports, the ITTF tends to recognise teams from generally unrecognised governing bodies for disputed territory. For example, it recognised the Table Tennis Federation of Kosovo in 2003 even though Kosovo was excluded from most other sports. It recognised the People's Republic of China in 1953 and allowed some basic diplomacy which lead to an opening for U.S. President Richard Nixon, called "Ping Pong Diplomacy", in the early 1970s.

The ITTF also approved unified Korean team to compete at the World Table Tennis Championships in 1991 and 2018.

In reaction to the 2022 Russian invasion of Ukraine, the ITTF banned Russian and Belarusian players and officials from its competitions. But this reaction has slowed down on 30 March 2023, stated that Russian and Belarusian players will be re-allowed to participate ITTF and WTT competitions under strict conditions of neutrality, with government or state officials, and national symbols such as flags and anthems of both countries to continue being banned in ITTF-sanctioned events.

== Rules ==
=== Player eligibility ===
For ITTF world title events, a player is eligible to play for his association by registering with the ITTF. If the player chooses to play for a new association, he shall register with the ITTF, through the new association. The player will be eligible to play for the new association after three, five, seven years after the date of registration, if the player is under the age of 15, 18, 21 respectively. The player will be eligible to play for the new association after nine years if the player is at least 21 years old.

=== Service and point system ===
The table tennis point system was reduced from a 21 to an 11-point scoring system in 2001. A game shall be won by the player or pair first scoring 11 points unless both players or pairs score 10 points, when the game shall be won by the first player or pair subsequently gaining a lead of 2 points. This was intended to make games more fast-paced and exciting. The ITTF also changed the rules on service to prevent a player from hiding the ball during service, in order to increase the average length of rallies and to reduce the server's advantage. Today, the game changes from time to time mainly to improve on the excitement for television viewers.

=== Speed glue ban ===
In 2007, ITTF's board of directors in Zagreb decided to implement the VOC-free glue rule at Junior events, starting from 1 January 2008, as a transitional period before the full implementation of the VOC ban on 1 September 2008.

As of 1 January 2009, all speed glue was to have been banned.

== ITTF tournaments ==
ITTF world ranking in men's singles

The ITTF and its subsidiary WTT hold international tournaments and the ITTF maintains official world ranking lists based on players' results in tournaments throughout the year.

Conventions: MT/WT: men's/women's team; MS/WS: men's/women's singles; MD/WD: men's/women's doubles; XD: mixed doubles; XT: mixed teams

Major International Events

Competition name	First held	Held every	Events							
Competition name	First held	Held every	MT	WT	MS	WS	MD	WD	XD	XT
World Championships	1926	Odd-numbered year			•	•	•	•	•	
World Team Championships	1926	Even-numbered year	•	•						
Summer Olympic Games	1988	Four years	•	•	•	•			•	
Table Tennis World Cup	1980	Annually (Note: The ITTF World Cup individual events were held annually except for 2021-2023.)	• (Note: World Cup Men's Team was held in (1990-2019))	• (Note: World Cup Women's Team was held in (1990-2019))	•	•	• (Note: World Cup Men's Doubles was only held in 1990 and 1992)	• (Note: World Cup Women's Doubles was held in 1990 and 1992)	•	• (Note: It was introduced in 2023)

Junior events

Competition name	First held	Held every	Events						
Competition name	First held	Held every	MT	WT	MS	WS	MD	WD	XD
World Youth Championships	2003	One year	•	•	•	•	•	•	•
Summer Youth Olympic Games	2010	Four years	•		•	•			

Para events

Competition name	First held	Held every	Events						
Competition name	First held	Held every	MT	WT	MS	WS	MD	WD	XD
Summer Paralympic Games	1960	Four years	•	•	•	•			
World Para Table Tennis Championships	1990	Four years	•	•	•	•			

== Ranking method ==
Singles

Category	W	F	SF	QF	R16	R32	R64	R128
Summer Olympics	2000	1400	700	350	175	90	45	-
World Table Tennis Championships	2000	1400	700	350	175	90	45	10
Table Tennis World Cup	1500	1050	525	265	100	40 for 2nd in the group, 15 for 3rd in the group		
ITTF World Tour Grand Finals	1500	1050	525	265	100	-	-	-
Grand Smash	2000	1400	700	350	175	90	20	–
WTT Champions	1000	700	350	175	90	15	–	–
WTT Star Contender	600	420	210	105	55	25	5	–
WTT Contender	400	280	140	70	35	4	–	–
Continental Games and Cups	500	350	175	90	45	–	–	–
WTT Feeder	125	90	45	25	15	8	–	–

== ITTF Museum ==
The ITTF Museum was previously in Lausanne, Switzerland, where the ITTF is based. The ITTF decided in 2014 to move the museum to Shanghai, China, which was planning the China Table Tennis Museum around the same time. The new museum was designated in the same building with the China Table Tennis Museum on different floors, managed and operated by Shanghai University of Sport, and officially opened in 2018.

== See also ==
- List of international sports federations
- ITTF Hall of Fame
- ITTF Star Awards
- World Table Tennis (ITTF)
- World Hopes Table Tennis Championship (U13/U11/U9)
