= Table tennis at the 2008 Summer Olympics – Men's team =

Table tennis – men's team at the Games of the XXIX Olympiad
- Venue: Peking University Gymnasium
- Date: August 13 to August 18, 2008
- Competitors: 48 from 16 nations
- Teams: 16

Medalists
1st place, gold medalist(s)		Ma Lin; Wang Hao; Wang Liqin	China
2nd place, silver medalist(s)		Timo Boll; Dimitrij Ovtcharov; Christian Süß	Germany
3rd place, bronze medalist(s)		Oh Sang-Eun; Ryu Seung-Min; Yoon Jae-Young	South Korea

The men's team table tennis event was part of the table tennis programme and took place between August 13 and 18, at the Peking University Gymnasium. Teams consisted of three members. The sixteen teams were divided into four groups of four teams each, playing a round-robin within their pool. The top team in each pool advanced to the semifinals, with the second-place team from each group going to the bronze medal playoffs. The two semifinal winners met in the gold medal match, while the two semifinal losers each played against one of the winners from the bronze medal playoffs, with the winners of those games meeting in the bronze medal match.

Each match consisted of up to five games, with the first team to win three being declared the winner. The first two games in each match were singles, the third was doubles, and the final two were singles again. Each team member competed in two of the five games, according to a set rotation.

== Schedule ==
All times are China Standard Time (UTC+8).

Dates	Start time	Round
August 13	10:00	Group C and D 1st group round (1–3, 2–4)
August 13	14:30	Group A and B 1st group round (1–3, 2–4)
August 13	19:30	Group C and D 2nd group round (1–4, 2–3)
August 14	10:00	Group A and B 2nd group round (1–4, 2–3)
August 14	14:30	Group C and D 3rd group round (1–2, 3–4)
August 14	19:30	Group A and B 3rd group round (1–2, 3–4)
August 15	9:00	Bronze playoff 1st round
August 16	14:30	Semifinals
August 16	19:30	Semifinals
August 17	10:00	Bronze playoff 2nd round
August 18	14:30	Bronze medal match
August 18	19:30	Gold medal match

== Seeds ==
Team ranking list was produced on the basis of the ITTF July 2008 world ranking. Only the players qualified from each team were taking into consideration to establish the ranking. Teams were drawn into four groups on August 7. Injured or sick athletes could be replaced by alternates. The alternates could only compete in the team event, the replaced athletes were not allowed to compete again at the 2008 Summer Olympics.

Rank	Group	Team	Athletes (world ranking in July 2008)			Alternate athletes
1	A	China	Wang Hao (1)	Ma Lin (2)	Wang Liqin (4)	Chen Qi (7)
2	B	Germany	Timo Boll (6)	Dimitrij Ovtcharov (14)	Christian Süß (40)	Bastian Steger (44)
3	C	South Korea	Ryu Seung-Min (8)	Oh Sang-Eun (15)	Yoon Jae-Young (25)	Lee Jung-woo (28)
4	D	Hong Kong	Li Ching (11)	Cheung Yuk (12)	Ko Lai Chak (30)	Leung Chu Yan (50)
5	D	Japan	Kan Yo (19)	Jun Mizutani (22)	Seiya Kishikawa (63)	Kaii Yoshida (35)
6	C	Chinese Taipei	Chuang Chih-yuan (10)	Chiang Peng-lung (23)	Chang Yen-shu (109)	
7	B	Singapore	Gao Ning (13)	Yang Zi (34)	Cai Xiaoli (170)	
8	A	Austria	Werner Schlager (16)	Chen Weixing (37)	Robert Gardos (47)	Daniel Habesohn (150)
9	B	Croatia	Zoran Primorac (32)	Tan Ruiwu (43)	Andrej Gaćina (118)	Ronald Redjep (161)
10	A	Greece	Kalinikos Kreanga (17)	Panagiotis Gionis (55)	Daniel Tsiokas (120)	
11	C	Sweden	Jörgen Persson (33)	Jens Lundqvist (58)	Pär Gerell (62)	Robert Svensson (105)
12	D	Russia	Alexey Smirnov (29)	Fedor Kuzmin (69)	Dmitry Mazunov (84)	
13	C	Brazil	Thiago Monteiro (66)	Gustavo Tsuboi (154)	Hugo Hoyama (155)	Cazuo Matsumoto (189)
14	D	Nigeria	Segun Toriola (113)	Monday Merotohun (249)	Kazeem Nosiru (260)	
15	B	Canada	Zhang Peng (125)	Pradeeban Peter-Paul (277)	Qiang Shen (377)	
16	A	Australia	William Henzell (147)	David Zalcberg (438)	Kyle Davis (466)	

== Group round ==
=== Group A ===
Team	Pts	Pld	W	L	GW	GL	Qualification
China	6	3	3	0	9	0	Qualified for the semifinals
Austria	5	3	2	1	6	3	Qualified for the bronze medal playoff
Greece	4	3	1	2	3	6	
Australia	3	3	0	3	0	9	

August 13, 2008; 14:30	China	3–0	Greece	Duration: 1h 14min

	Individual matches
Ma Lin	3–0	Panagiotis Gionis	11–5, 11–5, 11–3
Wang Hao	3–1	Kalinikos Kreanga	11–9, 11–9, 8–11, 11–8
Wang Liqin / Wang Hao	3–1	Ntaniel Tsiokas / Panagiotis Gionis	9–11, 11–7, 11–8, 11–8

August 13, 2008; 14:30	Austria	3–0	Australia	Duration: 1h 2min

	Individual matches
Chen Weixing	3–0	William Henzell	11–9, 12–10, 11–6
Werner Schlager	3–0	Kyle Davis	11–6, 11–8, 11–4
Robert Gardos / Chen Weixing	3–1	David Zalcberg / William Henzell	11–4, 8–11, 11–8, 11–6

August 14, 2008; 10:00	China	3–0	Australia	Duration: 1h 7min

	Individual matches
Wang Hao	3–0	Kyle Davis	11–8, 11–7, 11–4
Wang Liqin	3–1	William Henzell	6–11, 12–10, 11–9, 11–9
Ma Lin / Wang Liqin	3–0	David Zalcberg / William Henzell	11–9, 12–10, 11–6

August 14, 2008; 10:00	Austria	3–0	Greece	Duration: 1h 12min

	Individual matches
Robert Gardos	3–0	Kalinikos Kreanga	11–6, 11–9, 11–9
Werner Schlager	3–1	Panagiotis Gionis	7–11, 11–7, 11–8, 11–6
Chen Weixing / Robert Gardos	3–0	Ntaniel Tsiokas / Panagiotis Gionis	11–7, 11–8, 11–4

August 14, 2008; 19:30	China	3–0	Austria	Duration: 1h 11min

	Individual matches
Wang Hao	3–1	Chen Weixing	11–4, 9–11, 11–4, 11–5
Wang Liqin	3–0	Werner Schlager	11–6, 11–4, 11–8
Ma Lin / Wang Hao	3–1	Robert Gardos / Chen Weixing	11–7, 5–11, 11–4, 11–9

August 14, 2008; 19:30	Greece	3–0	Australia	Duration: 52min

	Individual matches
Kalinikos Kreanga	3–0	Kyle Davis	11–7, 11–4, 11–4
Panagiotis Gionis	3–0	William Henzell	11–7, 11–8, 11–8
Ntaniel Tsiokas / Panagiotis Gionis	3–0	David Zalcberg / William Henzell	11–4, 11–7, 11–4

=== Group B ===
Team	Pts	Pld	W	L	GW	GL	Qualification
Germany	6	3	3	0	9	1	Qualified for the semifinals
Croatia	5	3	2	1	6	4	Qualified for the bronze medal playoff
Singapore	4	3	1	2	5	6	
Canada	3	3	0	3	0	9	

August 13, 2008; 14:30	Germany	3–0	Croatia	Duration: 2h 9min

	Individual matches
Timo Boll	3–2	Zoran Primorac	9–11, 11–3, 11–9, 7–11, 11–9
Dimitrij Ovtcharov	3–2	Tan Ruiwu	13–11, 10–12, 9–11, 11–9, 11–9
Christian Süß / Timo Boll	3–1	Andrej Gaćina / Tan Ruiwu	12–10, 11–8, 12–14, 12–10

August 13, 2008; 14:30	Singapore	3–0	Canada	Duration: 1h 32min

	Individual matches
Gao Ning	3–1	Wilson Zhang	13–11, 11–4, 6–11, 11–9
Yang Zi	3–2	Pradeeban Peter-Paul	8–11, 11–4, 11–6, 8–11, 11–7
Cai Xiaoli / Yang Zi	3–1	Shen Qiang / Pradeeban Peter-Paul	9–11, 11–7, 13–11, 11–5

August 14, 2008; 10:00	Germany	3–0	Canada	Duration: 1h 17min

	Individual matches
Dimitrij Ovtcharov	3–1	Wilson Zhang	11–7, 5–11, 11–2, 11–6
Timo Boll	3–2	Pradeeban Peter-Paul	6–11, 7–11, 11–3, 11–2, 11–7
Christian Süß / Timo Boll	3–1	Shen Qiang / Pradeeban Peter-Paul	11–6, 7–11, 11–7, 11–5

August 14, 2008; 10:00	Singapore	1–3	Croatia	Duration: 1h 59min

	Individual matches
Yang Zi	0–3	Tan Ruiwu	8–11, 5–11, 8–11
Gao Ning	3–1	Zoran Primorac	10–12, 11–8, 11–9, 11–8
Cai Xiaoli / Yang Zi	1–3	Andrej Gaćina / Tan Ruiwu	12–10, 10–12, 11–13, 8–11
Cai Xiaoli	1–3	Zoran Primorac	6–11, 6–11, 11–8, 5–11

August 14, 2008; 19:30	Germany	3–1	Singapore	Duration: 1h 28min

	Individual matches
Timo Boll	3–0	Cai Xiaoli	11–7, 11–2, 11–5
Dimitrij Ovtcharov	0–3	Gao Ning	7–11, 7–11, 8–11
Christian Süß / Timo Boll	3–0	Yang Zi / Gao Ning	11–8, 11–3, 12–10
Dimitrij Ovtcharov	3–2	Yang Zi	10–12, 11–3, 4–11, 11–6, 11–5

August 14, 2008; 19:30	Croatia	3–0	Canada	Duration: 1h 4min

	Individual matches
Tan Ruiwu	3–1	Pradeeban Peter-Paul	11–8, 11–7, 11–13, 11–8
Zoran Primorac	3–0	Wilson Zhang	11–9, 11–6, 11–9
Andrej Gaćina / Tan Ruiwu	3–0	Shen Qiang / Pradeeban Peter-Paul	11–6, 11–6, 11–5

=== Group C ===
Team	Pts	Pld	W	L	GW	GL	Qualification
South Korea	6	3	3	0	9	2	Qualified for the semifinals
Chinese Taipei	5	3	2	1	7	6	Qualified for the bronze medal playoff
Sweden	4	3	1	2	5	6	
Brazil	3	3	0	3	2	9	

August 13, 2008; 10:00	South Korea	3–0	Sweden	Duration: 1h 18min

	Individual matches
Ryu Seung-Min	3–0	Jörgen Persson	11–8, 11–5, 11–6
Oh Sang-Eun	3–1	Jens Lundqvist	11–4, 7–11, 12–10, 11–7
Yoon Jae-Young / Oh Sang-Eun	3–2	Pär Gerell / Jens Lundqvist	11–13, 11–5, 9–11, 11–3, 11–4

August 13, 2008; 10:00	Chinese Taipei	3–1	Brazil	Duration: 1h 34min

	Individual matches
Chuang Chih-yuan	1–3	Hugo Hoyama	11–6, 11–13, 4–11, 10–12
Chiang Peng-lung	3–0	Thiago Monteiro	11–9, 11–5, 11–7
Chang Yen-shu / Chiang Peng-lung	3–1	Gustavo Tsuboi / Thiago Monteiro	11–9, 11–6, 12–14, 11–5
Chuang Chih-yuan	3–0	Gustavo Tsuboi	11–3, 11–8, 12–10

August 13, 2008; 19:30	South Korea	3–1	Brazil	Duration: 1h 10min

	Individual matches
Ryu Seung-Min	0–3	Thiago Monteiro	3–11, 10–12, 8–11
Oh Sang-Eun	3–1	Hugo Hoyama	11–1, 11–4, 7–11, 11–4
Yoon Jae-Young / Oh Sang-Eun	3–0	Gustavo Tsuboi / Thiago Monteiro	11–4, 11–4, 11–6
Yoon Jae-Young	3–0	Hugo Hoyama	14–12, 11–5, 11–5

August 13, 2008; 19:30	Chinese Taipei	3–2	Sweden	Duration: 2h 7min

	Individual matches
Chuang Chih-yuan	3–0	Jens Lundqvist	11–2, 11–8, 11–4
Chiang Peng-lung	1–3	Jörgen Persson	16–14, 6–11, 8–11, 12–14
Chang Yen-shu / Chiang Peng-lung	3–1	Pär Gerell / Jens Lundqvist	2–11, 11–8, 11–6, 11–6
Chang Yen-shu	0–3	Jörgen Persson	9–11, 7–11, 5–11
Chuang Chih-yuan	3–2	Pär Gerell	11–1, 11–13, 11–4, 6–11, 11–7

August 14, 2008; 14:30	South Korea	3–1	Chinese Taipei	Duration: 2h 22min

	Individual matches
Ryu Seung-Min	1–3	Chuang Chih-yuan	11–5, 8–11, 7–11, 17–19
Oh Sang-Eun	3–1	Chiang Peng-lung	11–2, 11–8, 8–11, 11–5
Yoon Jae-Young / Oh Sang-Eun	3–2	Chang Yen-shu / Chiang Peng-lung	6–11, 11–9, 11–8, 7–11, 14–12
Ryu Seung-Min	3–2	Chang Yen-shu	11–7, 6–11, 5–11, 11–7, 11–9

August 14, 2008; 14:30	Sweden	3–0	Brazil	Duration: 1h 14min

	Individual matches
Pär Gerell	3–2	Thiago Monteiro	6–11, 12–14, 13–11, 13–11, 11–4
Jens Lundqvist	3–0	Gustavo Tsuboi	11–8, 11–8, 11–5
Jörgen Persson / Pär Gerell	3–0	Hugo Hoyama / Thiago Monteiro	11–7, 12–10, 11–8

=== Group D ===
Team	Pts	Pld	W	L	GW	GL	Qualification
Japan	6	3	3	0	9	0	Qualified for the semifinals
Hong Kong	5	3	2	1	6	4	Qualified for the bronze medal playoff
Nigeria	4	3	1	2	3	8	
Russia	3	3	0	3	3	9	

August 13, 2008; 10:00	Hong Kong	3–1	Russia	Duration: 2h 3min

	Individual matches
Ko Lai Chak	3–2	Fedor Kuzmin	8–11, 11–9, 11–2, 6–11, 11–5
Cheung Yuk	1–3	Alexey Smirnov	11–9, 10–12, 9–11, 10–12
Li Ching / Ko Lai Chak	3–2	Dmitry Mazunov / Alexey Smirnov	4–11, 8–11, 11–7, 11–5, 12–10
Cheung Yuk	3–0	Dmitry Mazunov	11–8, 11–9, 11–8

August 13, 2008; 10:00	Japan	3–0	Nigeria	Duration: 59min

	Individual matches
Jun Mizutani	3–1	Segun Toriola	11–9, 3–11, 11–9, 11–8
Kan Yo	3–1	Monday Merotohun	11–5, 11–4, 9–11, 11–7
Seiya Kishikawa / Jun Mizutani	3–0	Kazeem Nosiru / Monday Merotohun	11–9, 11–9, 11–7

August 13, 2008; 19:30	Hong Kong	3–0	Nigeria	Duration: 1h 17min

	Individual matches
Li Ching	3–2	Segun Toriola	9–11, 11–4, 11–13, 11–8, 11–6
Cheung Yuk	3–2	Monday Merotohun	11–1, 12–14, 11–3, 7–11, 11–4
Ko Lai Chak / Li Ching	3–1	Kazeem Nosiru / Monday Merotohun	7–11, 11–7, 11–4, 11–9

August 13, 2008; 19:30	Japan	3–0	Russia	Duration: 1h 16min

	Individual matches
Jun Mizutani	3–1	Dmitry Mazunov	12–10, 11–8, 4–11, 11–9
Kan Yo	3–1	Fedor Kuzmin	11–2, 10–12, 11–5, 14–12
Seiya Kishikawa / Jun Mizutani	3–0	Alexey Smirnov / Dmitry Mazunov	11–4, 11–6, 11–5

August 14, 2008; 14:30	Hong Kong	0–3	Japan	Duration: 1h 35min

	Individual matches
Ko Lai Chak	1–3	Kan Yo	5–11, 8–11, 13–11, 9–11
Cheung Yuk	1–3	Jun Mizutani	5–11, 6–11, 11–6, 6–11
Li Ching / Ko Lai Chak	2–3	Seiya Kishikawa / Jun Mizutani	11–5, 4–11, 14–12, 12–14, 13–15

August 14, 2008; 14:30	Russia	2–3	Nigeria	Duration: 2h 12min

	Individual matches
Fedor Kuzmin	3–1	Segun Toriola	9–11, 12–10, 11–5, 11–9
Alexey Smirnov	1–3	Monday Merotohun	10–12, 11–9, 8–11, 7–11
Dmitry Mazunov / Fedor Kuzmin	3–0	Kazeem Nosiru / Monday Merotohun	11–5, 11–5, 11–4
Dmitry Mazunov	2–3	Segun Toriola	12–10, 11–9, 8–11, 7–11, 11–13
Alexey Smirnov	2–3	Kazeem Nosiru	11–5, 7–11, 11–9, 7–11, 9–11

== Final stage ==
=== Bracket ===
==== Finals ====
Semi-finals
A1	China	3	3	3
C1	South Korea	2	1	0
B1	Germany	3	3	1	2	3
D1	Japan	2	1	3	3	2

Gold Medal Match
A1	China	3	3	3
B1	Germany	0	1	1

==== Bronze medal playoff ====
Bronze Play-off Round 1
D2	Hong Kong	3	3	3
C2	Chinese Taipei	0	2	0
A2	Austria	3	3	2	3
B2	Croatia	0	0	3	1

Bronze Play-off Round 2
C1	South Korea	3	2	3	3
D2	Hong Kong	1	3	2	2
D1	Japan	3	0	2	1
A2	Austria	0	3	3	3

Bronze Medal Match
C1	South Korea	3	1	3	3
A2	Austria	1	3	0	0

=== Bronze playoff round 1 ===
August 15, 2008; 09:00	Hong Kong	3–0	Chinese Taipei	Duration: 1h 19min

	Individual matches
Cheung Yuk	3–0	Chuang Chih-yuan	11–8, 11–4, 11–6
Li Ching	3–2	Chiang Peng-lung	11–9, 11–13, 10–12, 11–9, 13–11
Ko Lai Chak / Li Ching	3–0	Chang Yen-shu / Chiang Peng-lung	11–8, 12–10, 11–8

August 15, 2008; 09:00	Austria	3–1	Croatia	Duration: 2h 13min

	Individual matches
Werner Schlager	3–0	Tan Ruiwu	11–9, 11–9, 11–8
Chen Weixing	3–0	Zoran Primorac	12–10, 13–11, 11–6
Robert Gardos / Chen Weixing	2–3	Andrej Gaćina / Tan Ruiwu	11–8, 11–9, 11–13, 11–13, 10–12
Werner Schlager	3–1	Andrej Gaćina	13–11, 11–8, 9–11, 12–10

=== Semifinals ===
August 16, 2008; 14:30	Japan	2–3	Germany	Duration: 3h 2min

	Individual matches
Kan Yo	2–3	Dimitrij Ovtcharov	7–11, 13–11, 11–13, 11–9, 10–12
Jun Mizutani	1–3	Timo Boll	5–11, 11–8, 4–11, 7–11
Seiya Kishikawa / Jun Mizutani	3–1	Christian Süß / Dimitrij Ovtcharov	4–11, 11–6, 11–9, 14–12
Kan Yo	3–2	Christian Süß	5–11, 8–11, 12–10, 11–9, 13–11
Seiya Kishikawa	2–3	Timo Boll	7–11, 12–10, 6–11, 11–8, 5–11

August 16, 2008; 19:30	China	3–0	South Korea	Duration: 1h 37min

	Individual matches
Ma Lin	3–2	Oh Sang-Eun	11–8, 7–11, 10–12, 13–11, 11–5
Wang Hao	3–1	Ryu Seung-Min	11–7, 6–11, 11–9, 11–6
Wang Liqin / Wang Hao	3–0	Yoon Jae-Young / Oh Sang-Eun	11–4, 11–6, 11–5

=== Bronze playoff round 2 ===
August 17, 2008; 10:00	South Korea	3–1	Hong Kong	Duration: 2h 24min

	Individual matches
Oh Sang-Eun	3–1	Cheung Yuk	11–7, 12–10, 14–16, 11–2
Ryu Seung-Min	2–3	Li Ching	9–11, 8–11, 11–8, 11–9, 7–11
Yoon Jae-Young / Ryu Seung-Min	3–2	Ko Lai Chak / Li Ching	9–11, 6–11, 11–7, 11–7, 11–5
Oh Sang-Eun	3–2	Ko Lai Chak	7–11, 10–12, 11–8, 11–9, 11–3

August 17, 2008; 10:00	Austria	3–1	Japan	Duration: 1h 48min

	Individual matches
Werner Schlager	0–3	Kan Yo	8–11, 3–11, 10–12
Chen Weixing	3–0	Jun Mizutani	11–4, 14–12, 11–7
Robert Gardos / Chen Weixing	3–2	Seiya Kishikawa / Jun Mizutani	11–9, 6–11, 11–6, 5–11, 14–12
Robert Gardos	3–1	Kan Yo	10–12, 11–7, 11–9, 11–7

=== Bronze medal match ===
August 18, 2008; 14:30	South Korea	3–1	Austria	Duration: 1h 56min

	Individual matches
Oh Sang-Eun	3–1	Werner Schlager	10–12, 11–5, 11–8, 11–5
Ryu Seung-Min	1–3	Robert Gardos	12–14, 8–11, 13–11, 5–11
Yoon Jae-Young / Oh Sang-Eun	3–0	Chen Weixing / Robert Gardos	11–8, 11–4, 13–11
Ryu Seung-Min	3–0	Chen Weixing	11–9, 11–5, 11–7

=== Gold medal match ===
August 18, 2008; 19:30	China	3–0	Germany	Duration: 1h 23min

	Individual matches
Wang Hao	3–0	Dimitrij Ovtcharov	11–4, 11–8, 11–7
Ma Lin	3–1	Timo Boll	11–7, 8–11, 11–4, 11–7
Wang Liqin / Wang Hao	3–1	Christian Süß / Timo Boll	11–13, 11–5, 11–8, 11–7
