= 2007 World Table Tennis Championships – Men's doubles =

Men's doubles at the 2007 World Table Tennis Championships
- Venue: Dom Sportova
- Location: Zagreb, Croatia
- Final score: 6–11, 11–7, 6–11, 11–3, 11–9, 11–9

Medalists
gold medal	Chen Qi; Ma Lin	China
silver medal	Wang Hao; Wang Liqin	China
bronze medal	Ko Lai Chak; Li Ching	Hong Kong
bronze medal	Chang Yen-shu; Chiang Peng-lung	Chinese Taipei

The 2007 World Table Tennis Championships men's doubles was the 49th edition of the men's doubles championship. The event took place in Zagreb, Croatia between May 21 and May 27, 2007.

Chen Qi and Ma Lin won the title after defeating Wang Hao and Wang Liqin in the final by four sets to two.

== Seeds ==
1. (China) Chen Qi / (China) Ma Lin (champions)
2. (China) Wang Hao / (China) Wang Liqin (final)
3. (Germany) Timo Boll / (Germany) Christian Süß (quarterfinals)
4. (Hong Kong) Ko Lai Chak / (Hong Kong) Li Ching (semifinals)
5. (China) Hao Shuai / (China) Ma Long (third round)
6. (South Korea) Lee Jung-woo / (South Korea) Oh Sang-eun (quarterfinals)
7. (Hong Kong) Cheung Yuk / (Hong Kong) Leung Chu Yan (second round)
8. (Serbia) Aleksandar Karakašević / (Serbia) Slobodan Grujić (quarterfinals)
9. (Austria) Chen Weixing / (Austria) Robert Gardos (second round)
10. (Singapore) Gao Ning / (Singapore) Yang Zi (second round)
11. (Russia) Alexey Smirnov / (Russia) Fedor Kuzmin (third round)
12. (Poland) Lucjan Błaszczyk / (Poland) Wang Zengyi (third round)
13. (South Korea) Lee Jung-sam / (South Korea) Ryu Seung-min (third round)
14. (Denmark) Michael Maze / (Denmark) Finn Tugwell (third round)
15. (South Korea) Joo Sae-hyuk / (South Korea) Kim Jung-hoon (second round)
16. (Japan) Seiya Kishikawa / (Japan) Jun Mizutani (quarterfinals)

== Finals ==
Quarterfinals
1	(China) Chen Qi (China) Ma Lin	11	9	11	11	11
6	(South Korea) Lee Jung-woo (South Korea) Oh Sang-eun	5	11	4	5	6
8	(Serbia) Aleksandar Karakašević (Serbia) Slobodan Grujić	11	9	8	11	4	6
4	(Hong Kong) Ko Lai Chak (Hong Kong) Li Ching	8	11	11	6	11	11
3	(Germany) Timo Boll (Germany) Christian Süß	6	11	6	7	11	9
(Chinese Taipei) Chang Yen-shu (Chinese Taipei) Chiang Peng-lung	11	8	11	11	7	11
16	(Japan) Seiya Kishikawa (Japan) Jun Mizutani	5	8	8	16	11	7
2	(China) Wang Hao (China) Wang Liqin	11	11	11	14	6	11

Semifinals
1	(China) Chen Qi (China) Ma Lin	7	12	11	11	11
4	(Hong Kong) Ko Lai Chak (Hong Kong) Li Ching	11	10	6	5	7
(Chinese Taipei) Chang Yen-shu (Chinese Taipei) Chiang Peng-lung	6	11	8	6	11	5
2	(China) Wang Hao (China) Wang Liqin	11	7	11	11	6	11

Final
1	(China) Chen Qi (China) Ma Lin	6	11	6	11	11	11
2	(China) Wang Hao (China) Wang Liqin	11	7	11	3	9	9

== Main draw ==
=== Top half ===
==== Section 1 ====
First round
1	(China) Chen Q (China) Ma L	11	11	11	11
(Poland) D Gorak (Poland) B Such	1	5	9	4
(Serbia) M Jevtović (Serbia) Ž Pete	11	11	11	11
(Italy) M Bobocica (Italy) M Yang	8	9	8	9
(Germany) J Roßkopf (Germany) B Steger	11	11	8	11	11
(Slovenia) S Lasan (Slovenia) J Zibrat	7	8	11	9	3
(Brazil) H Hoyama (Brazil) C Matsumoto	9	8	9	9
12	(Poland) L Błaszczyk (Poland) Z Y Wang	11	11	11	11
13	(South Korea) Lee J-S (South Korea) Ryu S-M	11	11	11	11
(Italy) V Piacentini (Italy) S Tomasi	8	6	7	8
(United States) M Hazinski (United States) V Subonj	13	11	8	11	11	7
(Argentina) S Liu (Argentina) P Tabachni	15	8	11	13	8	11
(Norway) G Erlandsen (Norway) J Wang	10	3	5	11	11	7
(France) E Lebesson (France) A Mattenet	12	11	11	7	3	11
(Slovakia) E Illas (Slovakia) L Pistej	4	10	8	11	6
6	(South Korea) Lee J-W (South Korea) Oh S-E	11	12	11	7	11

Second round
1	(China) Chen Q (China) Ma L	11	11	5	11	11
(Serbia) M Jevtović (Serbia) Ž Pete	6	3	11	4	3
(Germany) J Roßkopf (Germany) B Steger	7	6	11	6	11	4
12	(Poland) L Błaszczyk (Poland) Z Y Wang	11	11	8	11	8	11
13	(South Korea) Lee J-S (South Korea) Ryu S-M	11	12	11	11	11
(Argentina) S Liu (Argentina) P Tabachni	5	14	7	7	4
(France) E Lebesson (France) A Mattenet	8	8	9	9
6	(South Korea) Lee J-W (South Korea) Oh S-E	11	11	11	11

Third round
1	(China) Chen Q (China) Ma L	11	11	11	7	16
12	(Poland) L Błaszczyk (Poland) Z Y Wang	7	7	2	11	14
13	(South Korea) Lee J-S (South Korea) Ryu S-M	4	5	9	4
6	(South Korea) Lee J-W (South Korea) Oh S-E	11	11	11	11

Quarterfinals
1	(China) Chen Q (China) Ma L	11	9	11	11	11
6	(South Korea) Lee J-W (South Korea) Oh S-E	5	11	4	5	6

==== Section 2 ====
First round
8	(Serbia) A Karakašević (Serbia) S Grujić	11	11	9	11	11
(North Korea) Kim H-B (North Korea) Ri C-G	9	8	11	9	8
(India) Achanta S K (India) S Roy	11	6	9	11	11	11
(Austria) S Fegerl (Austria) W Schlager	4	11	11	9	7	9
(Romania) A Crişan (Romania) A Filimon	11	8	8	11	11	15
(Belgium) M Bratanov (Belgium) Y Vostes	8	11	11	6	9	13
(Kazakhstan) E Beknazarov (Kazakhstan) R Turgambaev	6	6	3	8
11	(Russia) A Smirnov (Russia) F Kuzmin	11	11	11	11
9	(Austria) W Chen (Austria) R Gardos	11	14	11	11
(Czech Republic) L Jancarik (Czech Republic) T Konecny	6	12	7	7
(Slovenia) M Horvat (Slovenia) B Tokič	3	11	9	11	6	8
(Sweden) J Lundqvist (Sweden) R Svensson	11	9	11	4	11	11
(Greece) P Gionis (Greece) K Kreanga	7	11	11	11	9	11
(Brazil) T Monteiro (Brazil) G Tsuboi	11	9	7	7	11	6
(New Zealand) P Craven (New Zealand) R Zhu	1	2	3	1
4	(Hong Kong) Ko L C (Hong Kong) Li C	11	11	11	11

Second round
8	(Serbia) A Karakašević (Serbia) S Grujić	12	11	11	11
(India) Achanta S K (India) S Roy	10	5	6	3
(Romania) A Crişan (Romania) A Filimon	9	3	5	8
11	(Russia) A Smirnov (Russia) F Kuzmin	11	11	11	11
9	(Austria) W Chen (Austria) R Gardos	9	6	9	11	11	11
(Sweden) J Lundqvist (Sweden) R Svensson	11	11	11	7	6	13
(Greece) P Gionis (Greece) K Kreanga	9	9	12	6
4	(Hong Kong) Ko L C (Hong Kong) Li C	11	11	14	11

Third round
8	(Serbia) A Karakašević (Serbia) S Grujić	11	7	11	5	11	11
11	(Russia) A Smirnov (Russia) F Kuzmin	3	11	8	11	4	6
(Sweden) J Lundqvist (Sweden) R Svensson	11	6	9	8	8
4	(Hong Kong) Ko L C (Hong Kong) Li C	6	11	11	11	11

Quarterfinals
8	(Serbia) A Karakašević (Serbia) S Grujić	11	9	8	11	4	6
4	(Hong Kong) Ko L C (Hong Kong) Li C	8	11	11	6	11	11

=== Bottom half ===
==== Section 3 ====
First round
3	(Germany) T Boll (Germany) C Suss	11	11	11	11
(Turkey) S Avci (Turkey) I Tavukcuoglu	5	9	6	5
(Hungary) J Jakab (Hungary) D Zwickl	4	7	11	11	5	9
(Czech Republic) A Gavlas (Czech Republic) P Korbel	11	11	9	7	11	11
(Croatia) Z Primorac (Croatia) R Tan	10	11	11	7	11	12
(Slovakia) T Keinath (Slovakia) P Sereda	12	8	2	11	8	10
(Portugal) T Apolonia (Portugal) M Freitas	7	11	7	6	7
10	(Singapore) Gao N (Singapore) Yang Z	11	7	11	11	11
15	(South Korea) Joo S-H (South Korea) Kim J-H	11	11	11	11
(Iran) M Ahadi (Iran) A Noroozi	8	5	6	8
(Austria) D Habesohn (Austria) B Presslmayer	11	8	11	5	13	11
(France) P Chila (France) C Legout	8	11	13	11	11	13
(Chinese Taipei) Chang Y-S (Chinese Taipei) Chiang P-L	12	10	11	11	11
(Egypt) A Saleh (Egypt) E-S Lashin	10	12	5	5	7
(Hungary) P Fazekas (Hungary) F Pazsy	4	9	5	8
7	(Hong Kong) Cheung Y (Hong Kong) Leung C Y	11	11	11	11

Second round
3	(Germany) T Boll (Germany) C Suss	11	11	5	11	11
(Czech Republic) A Gavlas (Czech Republic) P Korbel	5	8	11	9	9
(Croatia) Z Primorac (Croatia) R Tan	11	11	12	11
10	(Singapore) Gao N (Singapore) Yang Z	8	5	10	4
15	(South Korea) Joo S-H (South Korea) Kim J-H	7	11	13	11	5	11	11
(France) P Chila (France) C Legout	11	9	15	7	11	7	13
(Chinese Taipei) Chang Y-S (Chinese Taipei) Chiang P-L	11	9	11	11	7	11
7	(Hong Kong) Cheung Y (Hong Kong) Leung C Y	8	11	4	6	11	7

Third round
3	(Germany) T Boll (Germany) C Suss	12	11	11	11
(Croatia) Z Primorac (Croatia) R Tan	10	9	8	9
(France) P Chila (France) C Legout	9	8	9	11	4
(Chinese Taipei) Chang Y-S (Chinese Taipei) Chiang P-L	11	11	11	9	11

Quarterfinals
3	(Germany) T Boll (Germany) C Suss	6	11	6	7	11	9
(Chinese Taipei) Chang Y-S (Chinese Taipei) Chiang P-L	11	8	11	11	7	11

==== Section 4 ====
First round
5	(China) Hao S (China) Ma L	11	11	11	11
(Spain) A Carneros (Spain) M Duran	3	3	2	1
(Denmark) C Kongsgaard (Denmark) C Petersen	6	9	9	11	11
(Germany) P Baum (Germany) D Ovtcharov	11	11	11	7	13
(Sweden) F Håkansson (Sweden) J Persson	8	7	11	6	11	11	11
(Vietnam) Nguyen N H (Vietnam) Tran T Q	11	11	5	11	6	4	6
(Netherlands) D Heister (Netherlands) B Wijers	7	6	5	11	12
16	(Japan) S Kishikawa (Japan) J Mizutani	11	11	11	9	14
14	(Denmark) M Maze (Denmark) F Tugwell	12	9	11	13	11	11
(Croatia) A Gacina (Croatia) R Tosic	10	11	9	15	4	4
(Spain) Z W He (Spain) V Sanchez	7	11	11	11	11
(Chinese Taipei) Chuang C-Y (Chinese Taipei) Wu C-C	11	6	7	6	8
(Belarus) V Nekhvedovich (Belarus) V Samsonov	7	11	12	11	8	7	11
(Japan) K Matsudaira (Japan) T Takakiwa	11	7	10	6	11	11	5
(Nigeria) M Merotohun (Nigeria) S Toriola	4	7	5	3
2	(China) Wang H (China) Wang L	11	11	11	11

Second round
5	(China) Hao S (China) Ma L	11	11	11	11
(Germany) P Baum (Germany) D Ovtcharov	8	7	4	1
(Sweden) F Håkansson (Sweden) J Persson	11	10	10	8	6
16	(Japan) S Kishikawa (Japan) J Mizutani	8	12	12	11	11
14	(Denmark) M Maze (Denmark) F Tugwell	5	12	11	9	6	11	11
(Spain) Z W He (Spain) V Sanchez	11	10	9	11	11	6	8
(Belarus) V Nekhvedovich (Belarus) V Samsonov	8	7	8	11	8
2	(China) Wang H (China) Wang L	11	11	11	5	11

Third round
5	(China) Hao S (China) Ma L	8	11	2	9	8
16	(Japan) S Kishikawa (Japan) J Mizutani	11	6	11	11	11
14	(Denmark) M Maze (Denmark) F Tugwell	8	6	8	11	6
2	(China) Wang H (China) Wang L	11	11	11	4	11

Quarterfinals
16	(Japan) S Kishikawa (Japan) J Mizutani	5	8	8	16	11	7
2	(China) Wang H (China) Wang L	11	11	11	14	6	11
