= 2009 World Table Tennis Championships – Men's doubles =

Men's doubles at the 2009 World Table Tennis Championships
- Venue: Yokohama Arena
- Location: Yokohama, Japan
- Final score: 6–11, 13–11, 13–11, 11–5, 11–9

Medalists
gold medal	Chen Qi; Wang Hao	China
silver medal	Ma Long; Xu Xin	China
bronze medal	Hao Shuai; Zhang Jike	China
bronze medal	Seiya Kishikawa; Jun Mizutani	Japan

The 2009 World Table Tennis Championships men's doubles was the 50th edition of the men's doubles championship. Wang Hao and Chen Qi won the title after defeating Ma Long and Xu Xin in the final by four sets to one.

== Seeds ==
1. (China) Chen Qi / (China) Wang Hao (champions)
2. (China) Ma Long / (China) Xu Xin (final)
3. (Japan) Seiya Kishikawa / (Japan) Jun Mizutani (semifinals)
4. (Hong Kong) Cheung Yuk / (Hong Kong) Li Ching (quarterfinals, retired)
5. (South Korea) Oh Sang Eun / (South Korea) Ryu Seung Min (quarterfinals)
6. (Singapore) Gao Ning / (Singapore) Yang Zi (quarterfinals)
7. (Hong Kong) Jiang Tianyi / (Hong Kong) Tang Peng (quarterfinals)
8. (China) Hao Shuai / (China) Zhang Jike (semifinals)
9. (Croatia) Zoran Primorac / (Croatia) Roko Tošić (third round)
10. (Austria) Chen Weixing / (Austria) Robert Gardos (first round)
11. (Chinese Taipei) Chuang Chih-Yuan / (Chinese Taipei) Wu Chih-Chi (second round)
12. (Serbia) Slobodan Grujić / (Serbia) Aleksandar Karakašević (first round)
13. (Poland) Lucjan Błaszczyk / (Poland) Wang Zeng Yi (third round)
14. (Germany) Dimitrij Ovtcharov / (Germany) Bastian Steger (third round)
15. (Sweden) Pär Gerell / (Sweden) Jens Lundqvist (second round)
16. (Sweden) Jörgen Persson / (Sweden) Robert Svensson (third round)

== Final Rounds ==
Quarterfinals
1	(China) Chen Qi (China) Wang Hao	13	11	11	8	8	11
5	(South Korea) Oh Sang-Eun (South Korea) Ryu Seung-Min	11	7	9	11	11	9
8	(China) Hao Shuai (China) Zhang Jike
4	(Hong Kong) Cheung Yuk (Hong Kong) Li Ching	r
3	(Japan) Seiya Kishikawa (Japan) Jun Mizutani	9	11	11	4	11	13
6	(Singapore) Gao Ning (Singapore) Yang Zi	11	2	4	11	5	11
7	(Hong Kong) Jiang Tianyi (Hong Kong) Tang Peng	6	6	13	1	7
2	(China) Ma Long (China) Xu Xin	11	11	11	11	11

Semifinals
1	(China) Chen Qi (China) Wang Hao	9	11	13	11	11
8	(China) Hao Shuai (China) Zhang Jike	11	4	11	7	9
3	(Japan) Seiya Kishikawa (Japan) Jun Mizutani	6	8	3	5
2	(China) Ma Long (China) Xu Xin	11	11	11	11

Final
1	(China) Chen Qi (China) Wang Hao	6	13	13	11	11
2	(China) Ma Long (China) Xu Xin	11	11	11	5	9

== Early Rounds ==
=== Section 1 ===
First Round
1	(China) Q Chen (China) H Wang	11	11	11	11	11
Q	(Japan) K Matsudaira (Japan) K Niwa	8	13	6	5	8
8	(Spain) A Carneros (Spain) M Duran	14	8	9	11	9	13
9	(Chinese Taipei) H-C Chiang (Chinese Taipei) P-L Chiang	12	11	11	9	11	15
5	(Portugal) T Apolónia (Portugal) J Monteiro	11	9	11	11	11
Q	(Israel) I Abramov (Israel) Y Sharon	2	11	7	9	9
Q	(Belarus) A Kuchuk (Belarus) P Platonou	9	8	4	11	2
13	(Poland) L Błaszczyk (Poland) Z Wang	11	11	11	6	11
11	(Chinese Taipei) C-Y Chuang (Chinese Taipei) C-C Wu	12	11	6	4	11	11
11	(Poland) A Daniel (Poland) J Kosowski	10	7	11	11	4	4
Q	(Japan) K Matsudaira (Japan) J Ueda	11	11	11	12	9	5	11
14	(Germany) P Baum (Germany) Z Fejer-Konnerth	4	6	9	14	11	11	8
7	(Czech Republic) A Gavlas (Czech Republic) P Korbel	11	11	11	11
Q	(Kazakhstan) Y Beknazarov (Kazakhstan) M Surtubayev	1	5	2	8
Q	(Finland) T Soine (Finland) T Tamminen	8	7	3	6
5	(South Korea) S-E Oh (South Korea) S-M Ryu	11	11	11	11

Second Round
1	(China) Q Chen (China) H Wang	11	11	11	11
(Chinese Taipei) H-C Chiang (Chinese Taipei) P-L Chiang	5	9	9	7
(Portugal) T Apolónia (Portugal) J Monteiro	6	13	5	7	11	11	5
13	(Poland) L Błaszczyk (Poland) Z Wang	11	11	11	11	8	6	11
11	(Chinese Taipei) C-Y Chuang (Chinese Taipei) C-C Wu	8	5	8	13	8
Q	(Japan) K Matsudaira (Japan) J Ueda	11	11	11	11	11
(Czech Republic) A Gavlas (Czech Republic) P Korbel	7	11	11	11	6	5	2
5	(South Korea) S-E Oh (South Korea) S-M Ryu	11	9	1	7	11	11	11

Third Round
1	(China) Q Chen (China) H Wang	11	11	11	11	6	11
13	(Poland) L Błaszczyk (Poland) Z Wang	4	8	7	13	11	5
Q	(Japan) K Matsudaira (Japan) J Ueda	11	12	8	5	9	5
5	(South Korea) S-E Oh (South Korea) S-M Ryu	6	10	11	11	11	11

Quarter Finals
1	(China) Q Chen (China) H Wang	13	11	11	8	8	11
5	(South Korea) S-E Oh (South Korea) S-M Ryu	11	7	9	11	11	9

=== Section 2 ===
First Round
8	(China) S Hao (China) J Zhang	11	11	12	11
Q	(Australia) K Davis (Australia) W Henzell	4	3	10	5
8	(Greece) P Gionis (Greece) K Papageorgiou	11	11	8	11	4	11
9	(Italy) M Bobocica (Italy) M Yang	3	9	11	8	11	9
5	(Slovakia) T Keinath (Slovakia) P Sereda	11	11	12	11
Q	(Singapore) X Cai (Singapore) X Pang	6	6	10	7
Q	(Denmark) M Hindersson (Denmark) K Sternberg	7	7	11	9	8
14	(Germany) D Ovtcharov (Germany) B Steger	11	11	9	11	11
16	(Sweden) J Persson (Sweden) R Svensson	11	12	11	10	15	11
Q	(Vietnam) Q L Dinh (Vietnam) K Q Doan	9	10	13	12	13	5
Q	(Belgium) B Rogiers (Belgium) Y Vostes
14	(Croatia) A Gacina (Croatia) R Tan	r
7	(France) E Lebesson (France) A Mattenet	11	7	11	11	13
10	(Slovakia) E Illas (Slovakia) L Pistej	6	11	6	9	11
Q	(Egypt) O Assar (Egypt) A Nadim	4	4	4	7
4	(Hong Kong) Y Cheung (Hong Kong) C Li	11	11	11	11

Second Round
8	(China) S Hao (China) J Zhang	11	11	11	11
(Greece) P Gionis (Greece) K Papageorgiou	6	8	2	8
(Slovakia) T Keinath (Slovakia) P Sereda	8	14	6	9
14	(Germany) D Ovtcharov (Germany) B Steger	11	16	11	11
16	(Sweden) J Persson (Sweden) R Svensson	11	11	11	11
Q	(Belgium) B Rogiers (Belgium) Y Vostes	7	6	9	3
(France) E Lebesson (France) A Mattenet	9	11	8	12	6	5
4	(Hong Kong) Y Cheung (Hong Kong) C Li	11	9	11	10	11	11

Third Round
8	(China) S Hao (China) J Zhang	13	11	9	7	11	11
14	(Germany) D Ovtcharov (Germany) B Steger	11	6	11	11	5	9
16	(Sweden) J Persson (Sweden) R Svensson	9	3	9	12	11	11	7
4	(Hong Kong) Y Cheung (Hong Kong) C Li	11	11	11	10	5	9	11

Quarterfinals
8	(China) S Hao (China) J Zhang
4	(Hong Kong) Y Cheung (Hong Kong) C Li	r

=== Section 3 ===
First Round
3	(Japan) S Kishikawa (Japan) J Mizutani	10	11	12	11	11
16	(Czech Republic) L Jancarik (Czech Republic) J Simoncik	12	3	10	8	3
8	(Chinese Taipei) C-A Chen (Chinese Taipei) C-W Chuan	4	3	11	7	8
9	(South Korea) J-H Kim (South Korea) J-K Lee	11	11	3	11	11
5	(Brazil) T Monteiro (Brazil) G Tsuboi	11	11	7	9	11	11
12	(Argentina) S Liu (Argentina) P Tabachnik	5	3	11	11	4	5
4	(India) S Kamal (India) S Saha	11	11	13	13
12	(Serbia) S Grujić (Serbia) A Karakašević	7	9	11	11
15	(Sweden) P Gerell (Sweden) J Lundqvist	11	11	12	12	11
11	(Thailand) P Sanguansin (Thailand) P Sanguansin	8	9	14	10	4
3	(Ukraine) A Didukh (Ukraine) Y Zhmudenko	15	6	11	5	8	11	10
14	(Russia) F Kuzmin (Russia) I Rubtsov	13	11	8	11	11	5	12
7	(Belarus) V Nekhvedovich (Belarus) V Samsonov	11	11	11	11
10	(Slovenia) U Slatinšek (Slovenia) B Tokić	7	7	6	3
2	(Turkey) B Vang (Turkey) C Zeng	11	6	11	11	6	2	8
6	(Singapore) N Gao (Singapore) Z Yang	6	11	5	5	11	11	11

Second Round
3	(Japan) S Kishikawa (Japan) J Mizutani	13	5	11	11	12
(South Korea) J-H Kim (South Korea) J-K Lee	11	11	7	10	9
(Brazil) T Monteiro (Brazil) G Tsuboi	11	11	10	11	8	11	11
(India) S Kamal (India) S Saha	13	7	12	5	11	9	8
15	(Sweden) P Gerell (Sweden) J Lundqvist	9	7	11	7	10
(Russia) F Kuzmin (Russia) I Rubtsov	11	11	8	11	12
(Belarus) V Nekhvedovich (Belarus) V Samsonov	6	14	10	9	8
6	(Singapore) N Gao (Singapore) Z Yang	11	12	12	11	11

Third Round
3	(Japan) S Kishikawa (Japan) J Mizutani	10	12	11	11	8	11
(Brazil) T Monteiro (Brazil) G Tsuboi	12	10	9	6	11	5
(Russia) F Kuzmin (Russia) I Rubtsov	7	9	12	11	11	13	7
6	(Singapore) N Gao (Singapore) Z Yang	11	11	14	8	5	11	11

Quarterfinals
3	(Japan) S Kishikawa (Japan) J Mizutani	9	11	11	4	11	13
6	(Singapore) N Gao (Singapore) Z Yang	11	2	4	11	5	11

=== Section 4 ===
First Round
7	(Hong Kong) T Jiang (Hong Kong) P Tang	11	11	6	11	11
Q	(Dominican Republic) J Lin (Dominican Republic) J Vila	6	3	11	5	7
8	(Brazil) H Hoyama (Brazil) C Matsumoto	11	11	11	11	6	7	5
9	(Spain) Z He (Spain) C Machado	9	13	5	8	11	11	11
5	(Egypt) A Saleh (Egypt) E Lashin	8	8	11	14	8
Q	(Iran) M Ahadi (Iran) V Malmiri	11	11	4	16	11
4	(Estonia) A Smirnov (Estonia) V Vainula	5	5	7	13	9
9	(Croatia) Z Primorac (Croatia) R Tošić	11	11	11	11	11
10	(Austria) W Chen (Austria) R Gardos	7	7	11	4	11	11
Q	(Portugal) M Freitas (Portugal) A Silva	11	11	8	11	7	13
3	(Austria) D Habesohn (Austria) B Presslmayer	8	10	14	11	6	11	11
14	(Romania) A Crişan (Romania) A Filimon	11	12	12	8	11	7	3
7	(South Korea) S-H Joo (South Korea) H-D Seo	11	11	14	11	11
10	(Russia) M Paykov (Russia) K Skachkov	9	4	16	5	6
Q	(Serbia) M Jevtović (Serbia) Ž Pete	8	7	5	3
2	(China) L Ma (China) X Xu	11	11	11	11

Second Round
7	(Hong Kong) T Jiang (Hong Kong) P Tang	11	11	11	8	11
(Spain) Z He (Spain) C Machado	4	6	4	11	5
Q	(Iran) M Ahadi (Iran) V Malmiri	8	5	7	10
9	(Croatia) Z Primorac (Croatia) R Tošić	11	11	11	12
Q	(Portugal) M Freitas (Portugal) A Silva	12	11	5	11	8	11
(Austria) D Habesohn (Austria) B Presslmayer	10	7	11	6	11	4
(South Korea) S-H Joo (South Korea) H-D Seo	13	11	7	6	5	8
2	(China) L Ma (China) X Xu	11	7	11	11	11	11

Third Round
7	(Hong Kong) T Jiang (Hong Kong) P Tang	8	8	12	11	6	13	11
9	(Croatia) Z Primorac (Croatia) R Tošić	11	11	10	8	11	11	3
Q	(Portugal) M Freitas (Portugal) A Silva	5	8	11	9	4
2	(China) L Ma (China) X Xu	11	11	9	11	11

Quarterfinals
7	(Hong Kong) T Jiang (Hong Kong) P Tang	6	6	13	1	7
2	(China) L Ma (China) X Xu	11	11	11	11	11
