= Table tennis at the 2006 Asian Games – Men's doubles =

Men's doubles at the 2006 Asian Games
- Venue: Al-Arabi Indoor Hall
- Dates: 4–6 December 2006
- Competitors: 62 from 18 nations

Medalists
| gold medal | Ko Lai Chak; Li Ching | Hong Kong |
| silver medal | Chen Qi; Ma Lin | China |
| bronze medal | Chiang Peng-lung; Chuang Chih-yuan | Chinese Taipei |
| bronze medal | Ma Long; Wang Hao | China |

The men's doubles table tennis event was part of the table tennis programme and took place between December 4 and 6, at the Al-Arabi Indoor Hall.

== Schedule ==
All times are Arabia Standard Time (UTC+03:00)

| Date | Time | Event |
|---|---|---|
| Monday, 4 December 2006 | 11:30 | Round of 32 |
| Monday, 4 December 2006 | 18:45 | Round of 16 |
| Tuesday, 5 December 2006 | 15:45 | Quarterfinals |
| Wednesday, 6 December 2006 | 12:00 | Semifinals |
| Wednesday, 6 December 2006 | 20:30 | Final |

== Results ==
Legend

- WO — Won by walkover

=== Finals ===
| Semifinals | | | | | | | | Final |
| 1 | Chen Qi (CHN); Ma Lin (CHN) | 6 | 11 | 11 | 11 | 11 |
| 4 | Chiang Peng-lung (TPE); Chuang Chih-yuan (TPE) | 11 | 6 | 6 | 4 | 4 | | 1 | Chen Qi (CHN); Ma Lin (CHN) | 8 | 11 | 5 | 4 | 11 | 7 |
| 5 | Ko Lai Chak (HKG); Li Ching (HKG) | 11 | 11 | 11 | 9 | 12 | 16 | 5 | Ko Lai Chak (HKG); Li Ching (HKG) | 11 | 4 | 11 | 11 | 8 | 11 |
| 2 | Ma Long (CHN); Wang Hao (CHN) | 3 | 6 | 8 | 11 | 14 | 14 |

=== Top half ===
==== Section 1 ====
Round of 32
Mohammed Al-Hashedi (YEM); Wael Al-Qershi (YEM) | 13 | 11 | 11
Basher Salah (PLE); Hatem Wadi (PLE) | 11 | 3 | 6
Sharath Kamal (IND); Soumyadeep Roy (IND) | 9 | 9 | 9
Đinh Quang Linh (VIE); Đoàn Kiến Quốc (VIE) | 11 | 11 | 11
An Chol-yong (PRK); Ri Chol-guk (PRK) | 1 | 8 | 10
6 | Cheung Yuk (HKG); Leung Chu Yan (HKG) | 11 | 11 | 12

Round of 16
1 | Chen Qi (CHN); Ma Lin (CHN) | 11 | 11 | 11
Mohammed Al-Hashedi (YEM); Wael Al-Qershi (YEM) | 5 | 5 | 3
Đinh Quang Linh (VIE); Đoàn Kiến Quốc (VIE) | 4 | 12 | 10 | 4
6 | Cheung Yuk (HKG); Leung Chu Yan (HKG) | 11 | 10 | 12 | 11

Quarterfinals
1 | Chen Qi (CHN); Ma Lin (CHN) | 11 | 11 | 11
6 | Cheung Yuk (HKG); Leung Chu Yan (HKG) | 9 | 4 | 6

==== Section 2 ====
Round of 32
7 | Ryu Seung-min (KOR); Yoon Jae-young (KOR) | 11 | 11 | 11
Cheong Chi Yung (MAC); Vong Hon Weng (MAC) | 5 | 6 | 4
Waleed Al-Hajjai (QAT); Ahmed Al-Mohannadi (QAT) | 9 | 4 | 10
Cai Xiaoli (SIN); Clarence Lee (SIN) | 11 | 11 | 12
Yo Kan (JPN); Kaii Yoshida (JPN) | W | O
Sirojiddin Ismoilov (TJK); Khurshed Salibaev (TJK)
Hamad Buhijji (BRN); Anwar Makki (BRN) | 4 | 4 | 3
4 | Chiang Peng-lung (TPE); Chuang Chih-yuan (TPE) | 11 | 11 | 11

Round of 16
7 | Ryu Seung-min (KOR); Yoon Jae-young (KOR) | 12 | 8 | 11 | 11
Cai Xiaoli (SIN); Clarence Lee (SIN) | 10 | 11 | 5 | 4
Yo Kan (JPN); Kaii Yoshida (JPN) | 6 | 11 | 8
4 | Chiang Peng-lung (TPE); Chuang Chih-yuan (TPE) | 11 | 13 | 11

Quarterfinals
7 | Ryu Seung-min (KOR); Yoon Jae-young (KOR) | 6 | 11 | 6 | 11 | 9
4 | Chiang Peng-lung (TPE); Chuang Chih-yuan (TPE) | 11 | 6 | 11 | 7 | 11

=== Bottom half ===
==== Section 3 ====
Round of 32
3 | Lee Jung-woo (KOR); Oh Sang-eun (KOR) | 11 | 12 | 11
Ernesto Ebuen (PHI); Richard Gonzales (PHI) | 1 | 10 | 5
Thilina Piyadasa (SRI); Rohan Sirisena (SRI) | 2 | 8 | 11 | 11 | 11
Omar Al-Kades (YEM); Fahad Gubran (YEM) | 11 | 11 | 7 | 9 | 5
Rashid Al-Majed (BRN); Hamad Yousif (BRN) | 5 | 2 | 10
Lkhagvadorjiin Altantulga (MGL); Yadmaagiin Begz (MGL) | 11 | 11 | 12
Nguyễn Nam Hải (VIE); Trần Tuấn Quỳnh (VIE) | 9 | 2 | 11
5 | Ko Lai Chak (HKG); Li Ching (HKG) | 11 | 11 | 13

Round of 16
3 | Lee Jung-woo (KOR); Oh Sang-eun (KOR) | 11 | 11 | 11
Thilina Piyadasa (SRI); Rohan Sirisena (SRI) | 4 | 6 | 7
Lkhagvadorjiin Altantulga (MGL); Yadmaagiin Begz (MGL) | 4 | 5 | 3
5 | Ko Lai Chak (HKG); Li Ching (HKG) | 11 | 11 | 11

Quarterfinals
3 | Lee Jung-woo (KOR); Oh Sang-eun (KOR) | 8 | 10 | 11 | 8
5 | Ko Lai Chak (HKG); Li Ching (HKG) | 11 | 12 | 4 | 11

==== Section 4 ====
Round of 32
8 | Gao Ning (SIN); Yang Zi (SIN) | 11 | 11 | 11
Ho Wing Lung (MAC); Iam Tong Hou (MAC) | 5 | 4 | 5
Seiya Kishikawa (JPN); Jun Mizutani (JPN) | 11 | 11 | 11
Husam Al-Baz (PLE); Abdallah Al-Saqqa (PLE) | 2 | 5 | 5
Chang Yen-shu (TPE); Wu Chih-chi (TPE) | 11 | 11 | 11
Pathik Mehta (IND); Subhajit Saha (IND) | 5 | 4 | 6
Ahmed Al-Awlaqi (QAT); Mohammed Al-Saadi (QAT) | 1 | 5 | 6
2 | Ma Long (CHN); Wang Hao (CHN) | 11 | 11 | 11

Round of 16
8 | Gao Ning (SIN); Yang Zi (SIN) | 11 | 10 | 9 | 6
Seiya Kishikawa (JPN); Jun Mizutani (JPN) | 8 | 12 | 11 | 11
Chang Yen-shu (TPE); Wu Chih-chi (TPE) | 11 | 5 | 7 | 12 | 7
2 | Ma Long (CHN); Wang Hao (CHN) | 9 | 11 | 11 | 10 | 11

Quarterfinals
Seiya Kishikawa (JPN); Jun Mizutani (JPN) | 3 | 11 | 6 | 11
2 | Ma Long (CHN); Wang Hao (CHN) | 11 | 9 | 11 | 13
