= Table tennis at the 2006 Asian Games – Men's team =

Men's team at the 2006 Asian Games
- Venue: Al-Arabi Indoor Hall
- Dates: 29 November – 3 December 2006
- Competitors: 69 from 15 nations

Medalists
gold medal	China; Chen Qi, Hao Shuai, Ma Lin, Ma Long, Wang Hao
silver medal	South Korea; Joo Sae-hyuk, Lee Jung-woo, Oh Sang-eun, Ryu Seung-min, Yoon Jae-young
bronze medal	Chinese Taipei; Chang Yen-shu, Chiang Peng-lung, Chou Tung-yu, Chuang Chih-yuan, Wu Chih-chi
bronze medal	Hong Kong; Cheung Yuk, Ko Lai Chak, Leung Chu Yan, Li Ching, Tse Ka Chun

The men's team table tennis event was part of the table tennis programme and took place between November 29 and December 3, at the Al-Arabi Indoor Hall.

== Schedule ==
All times are Arabia Standard Time (UTC+03:00)

Date	Time	Event
Wednesday, 29 November 2006	12:30	Preliminary round 1
Wednesday, 29 November 2006	19:00	Preliminary round 2
Thursday, 30 November 2006	12:30	Preliminary round 3
Thursday, 30 November 2006	19:00	Quarterfinals
Saturday, 2 December 2006	16:30	Semifinals
Sunday, 3 December 2006	18:00	Final

== Results ==
=== Preliminary round ===
==== Group A ====
Pos	Team	Pld	W	L	MF	MA	Pts	Qualification
1	China	3	3	0	9	0	6	Quarterfinals
2	Japan	3	2	1	6	4	5	Quarterfinals
3	India	3	1	2	4	6	4	
4	Yemen	3	0	3	0	9	3	

Source: JTTA

29 November	China	3–0	Yemen

Ma Lin	3–0	Fahad Gubran	11–3, 11–2, 11–4
Hao Shuai	3–0	Mohammed Al-Hashedi	11–4, 12–10, 11–4
Wang Hao	3–0	Wael Al-Qershi	11–2, 11–6, 11–7

29 November	Japan	3–1	India

Yo Kan	1–3	Sharath Kamal	14–12, 11–13, 9–11, 6–11
Jun Mizutani	3–0	Subhajit Saha	11–4, 11–9, 12–10
Kaii Yoshida	3–0	Soumyadeep Roy	11–6, 11–9, 11–6
Jun Mizutani	3–2	Sharath Kamal	11–7, 8–11, 11–6, 5–11, 11–5

29 November	China	3–0	India

Ma Long	3–0	Sharath Kamal	11–2, 11–9, 12–10
Ma Lin	3–1	Subhajit Saha	3–11, 11–4, 13–11, 11–1
Chen Qi	3–0	Soumyadeep Roy	11–8, 11–6, 11–9

29 November	Japan	3–0	Yemen

Seiya Kishikawa	3–0	Wael Al-Qershi	11–5, 11–5, 11–9
Kaii Yoshida	3–0	Mohammed Al-Hashedi	11–6, 11–4, 11–6
Yo Kan	3–0	Fahad Gubran	12–10, 11–6, 11–4

30 November	China	3–0	Japan

Wang Hao	3–0	Jun Mizutani	14–12, 11–9, 11–5
Ma Long	3–1	Kaii Yoshida	11–9, 10–12, 11–9, 11–4
Chen Qi	3–0	Seiya Kishikawa	11–5, 11–7, 11–7

30 November	India	3–0	Yemen

Sharath Kamal	3–0	Mohammed Al-Hashedi	13–11, 11–5, 11–7
Subhajit Saha	3–0	Fahad Gubran	11–6, 11–9, 11–3
Jitendra Kumar Gidla	3–0	Zeyad Al-Shaikh	11–9, 11–2, 11–2

==== Group B ====
Pos	Team	Pld	W	L	MF	MA	Pts	Qualification
1	South Korea	3	3	0	9	0	6	Quarterfinals
2	Qatar	3	2	1	6	3	5	Quarterfinals
3	Mongolia	3	1	2	3	6	4	
4	Palestine	3	0	3	0	9	2	

Source: JTTA

29 November	Qatar	3–0	Mongolia

Waleed Al-Hajjai	3–2	Lkhagvadorjiin Altantulga	7–11, 11–1, 9–11, 11–7, 11–9
Ahmed Al-Mohannadi	3–0	Yadmaagiin Begz	11–4, 11–6, 11–7
Hamad Al-Hammadi	3–0	Sükheegiin Galbadrakh	11–6, 11–7, 11–5

29 November	South Korea	3–0	Palestine

—	3–0	—	Walkover
—	3–0	—	Walkover
—	3–0	—	Walkover

29 November	Qatar	3–0	Palestine

Waleed Al-Hajjai	3–0	Basher Salah	11–6, 12–10, 11–3
Ahmed Al-Mohannadi	3–0	Husam Al-Baz	11–4, 11–6, 11–5
Mohammed Al-Saadi	3–0	Hatem Wadi	11–6, 11–7, 11–6

29 November	South Korea	3–0	Mongolia

Lee Jung-woo	3–0	Lkhagvadorjiin Altantulga	11–3, 11–4, 11–2
Joo Sae-hyuk	3–0	Yadmaagiin Begz	11–5, 11–3, 11–8
Yoon Jae-young	3–0	Sükheegiin Galbadrakh	11–4, 11–8, 11–9

30 November	South Korea	3–0	Qatar

Oh Sang-eun	3–0	Waleed Al-Hajjai	11–4, 11–3, 11–5
Ryu Seung-min	3–0	Ahmed Al-Mohannadi	11–3, 11–5, 11–5
Lee Jung-woo	3–0	Ahmed Al-Awlaqi	11–9, 11–6, 11–5

30 November	Mongolia	3–0	Palestine

Lkhagvadorjiin Altantulga	3–1	Basher Salah	11–7, 11–8, 10–12, 13–11
Yadmaagiin Begz	3–1	Hatem Wadi	11–8, 11–5, 9–11, 11–6
Sükheegiin Galbadrakh	3–0	Abdallah Al-Saqqa	11–5, 11–9, 11–7

==== Group C ====
Pos	Team	Pld	W	L	MF	MA	Pts	Qualification
1	Hong Kong	3	3	0	9	0	6	Quarterfinals
2	Vietnam	3	2	1	6	4	5	Quarterfinals
3	Macau	3	1	2	3	8	4	
4	Bahrain	3	0	3	3	9	3	

Source: JTTA

29 November	Hong Kong	3–0	Bahrain

Leung Chu Yan	3–0	Hamad Buhijji	11–4, 11–9, 11–2
Ko Lai Chak	3–0	Anwar Makki	11–2, 11–3, 11–4
Tse Ka Chun	3–0	Rashid Al-Majed	12–10, 11–3, 11–6

29 November	Vietnam	3–0	Macau

Trần Tuấn Quỳnh	3–2	Leong Kin Wa	11–7, 5–11, 8–11, 11–7, 11–6
Đoàn Kiến Quốc	3–0	Vong Hon Weng	11–8, 11–9, 11–8
Đinh Quang Linh	3–0	Ho Wing Lung	12–10, 11–8, 13–11

29 November	Hong Kong	3–0	Macau

Cheung Yuk	3–0	Leong Kin Wa	11–9, 11–5, 11–3
Li Ching	3–0	Cheong Chi Yung	11–4, 11–2, 11–6
Ko Lai Chak	3–0	Iam Tong Hou	11–3, 11–6, 11–3

29 November	Vietnam	3–1	Bahrain

Đinh Quang Linh	2–3	Hamad Buhijji	7–11, 11–4, 10–12, 11–6, 6–11
Đoàn Kiến Quốc	3–0	Anwar Makki	15–13, 11–5, 11–6
Nguyễn Nam Hải	3–0	Rashid Al-Majed	11–8, 11–5, 11–4
Đoàn Kiến Quốc	3–1	Hamad Buhijji	12–10, 8–11, 11–7, 11–4

30 November	Hong Kong	3–0	Vietnam

Li Ching	3–0	Đinh Quang Linh	11–6, 11–4, 11–2
Ko Lai Chak	3–0	Đoàn Kiến Quốc	11–8, 11–6, 11–4
Cheung Yuk	3–2	Nguyễn Nam Hải	11–9, 7–11, 8–11, 11–4, 11–7

30 November	Macau	3–2	Bahrain

Vong Hon Weng	0–3	Hamad Buhijji	9–11, 8–11, 6–11
Iam Tong Hou	2–3	Anwar Makki	11–4, 3–11, 6–11, 11–9, 10–12
Ho Wing Lung	3–1	Hamad Yousif	11–5, 7–11, 11–7, 11–5
Iam Tong Hou	3–0	Hamad Buhijji	11–8, 11–5, 12–10
Vong Hon Weng	3–1	Anwar Makki	20–18, 3–11, 11–6, 11–8

==== Group D ====
Pos	Team	Pld	W	L	MF	MA	Pts	Qualification
1	Chinese Taipei	2	2	0	6	2	4	Quarterfinals
2	Singapore	2	1	1	4	5	3	Quarterfinals
3	North Korea	2	0	2	3	6	2	

Source: JTTA

29 November	North Korea	2–3	Singapore

Ri Chol-guk	3–0	Yang Zi	11–6, 11–4, 11–8
An Chol-yong	0–3	Gao Ning	6–11, 8–11, 1–11
Kim Song-chol	3–1	Cai Xiaoli	13–11, 11–9, 6–11, 11–7
Ri Chol-guk	0–3	Gao Ning	5–11, 5–11, 6–11
An Chol-yong	1–3	Yang Zi	10–12, 8–11, 11–7, 8–11

29 November	Chinese Taipei	3–1	Singapore

Chuang Chih-yuan	3–0	Yang Zi	11–9, 11–4, 11–7
Chiang Peng-lung	1–3	Gao Ning	11–8, 13–15, 4–11, 5–11
Chang Yen-shu	3–0	Cai Xiaoli	11–3, 12–10, 11–8
Chuang Chih-yuan	3–2	Gao Ning	11–5, 12–10, 6–11, 11–13, 11–5

30 November	Chinese Taipei	3–1	North Korea

Chuang Chih-yuan	3–2	Ri Chol-guk	11–3, 11–6, 9–11, 11–13, 11–7
Chiang Peng-lung	2–3	Kim Song-chol	7–11, 6–11, 11–8, 11–6, 5–11
Chang Yen-shu	3–2	An Chol-yong	11–5, 11–8, 5–11, 5–11, 11–6
Chuang Chih-yuan	3–1	Kim Song-chol	4–11, 11–4, 11–8, 11–7

=== Knockout round ===
Quarterfinals
A1	China	3
Qatar	0
Vietnam	0
D1	Chinese Taipei	3
C1	Hong Kong	3
Japan	2
Singapore	0
B1	South Korea	3

Semifinals
A1	China	3
D1	Chinese Taipei	0
C1	Hong Kong	0
B1	South Korea	3

Final
A1	China	3
B1	South Korea	0

==== Quarterfinals ====
30 November	China	3–0	Qatar

Ma Lin	3–0	Mohammed Al-Saadi	11–1, 11–1, 11–4
Chen Qi	3–1	Ahmed Al-Mohannadi	11–1, 11–6, 4–11, 11–5
Ma Long	3–0	Ahmed Al-Awlaqi	11–5, 11–3, 11–5

30 November	Vietnam	0–3	Chinese Taipei

Nguyễn Nam Hải	0–3	Chuang Chih-yuan	3–11, 3–11, 6–11
Đoàn Kiến Quốc	0–3	Chiang Peng-lung	4–11, 10–12, 7–11
Đinh Quang Linh	1–3	Chang Yen-shu	11–7, 3–11, 6–11, 5–11

30 November	Hong Kong	3–2	Japan

Cheung Yuk	2–3	Yo Kan	10–12, 13–11, 7–11, 11–4, 5–11
Li Ching	3–0	Kaii Yoshida	11–8, 11–9, 11–5
Ko Lai Chak	0–3	Jun Mizutani	11–13, 9–11, 3–11
Li Ching	3–2	Yo Kan	8–11, 11–9, 11–7, 3–11, 11–8
Cheung Yuk	3–0	Kaii Yoshida	11–6, 11–5, 11–9

30 November	Singapore	0–3	South Korea

Gao Ning	2–3	Oh Sang-eun	7–11, 11–8, 11–5, 3–11, 1–11
Yang Zi	1–3	Joo Sae-hyuk	11–9, 6–11, 6–11, 6–11
Cai Xiaoli	0–3	Ryu Seung-min	9–11, 10–12, 6–11

==== Semifinals ====
2 December	China	3–0	Chinese Taipei

Ma Lin	3–1	Chuang Chih-yuan	11–7, 8–11, 11–6, 11–4
Wang Hao	3–0	Wu Chih-chi	11–4, 11–6, 11–7
Chen Qi	3–0	Chiang Peng-lung	11–5, 11–6, 12–10

2 December	Hong Kong	0–3	South Korea

Cheung Yuk	2–3	Oh Sang-eun	11–9, 7–11, 12–10, 8–11, 9–11
Li Ching	2–3	Ryu Seung-min	11–4, 11–13, 4–11, 11–4, 9–11
Leung Chu Yan	1–3	Lee Jung-woo	8–11, 11–8, 9–11, 8–11

==== Final ====
3 December	China	3–0	South Korea

Wang Hao	3–0	Ryu Seung-min	12–10, 11–4, 11–4
Ma Lin	3–2	Oh Sang-eun	8–11, 11–6, 11–6, 5–11, 11–3
Chen Qi	3–1	Joo Sae-hyuk	11–6, 11–2, 9–11, 11–9

== Non-participating athletes ==
- Mohamed Khaled Rashed (BRN)
- Pathik Mehta (IND)
- Saleh Musleh (PLE)
- Jason Ho (SIN)
- Clarence Lee (SIN)
- Chou Tung-yu (TPE)
- Omar Al-Kades (YEM)
