= Table tennis at the 2012 Summer Olympics – Men's team =

Table tennis – men's team at the Games of the XXX Olympiad
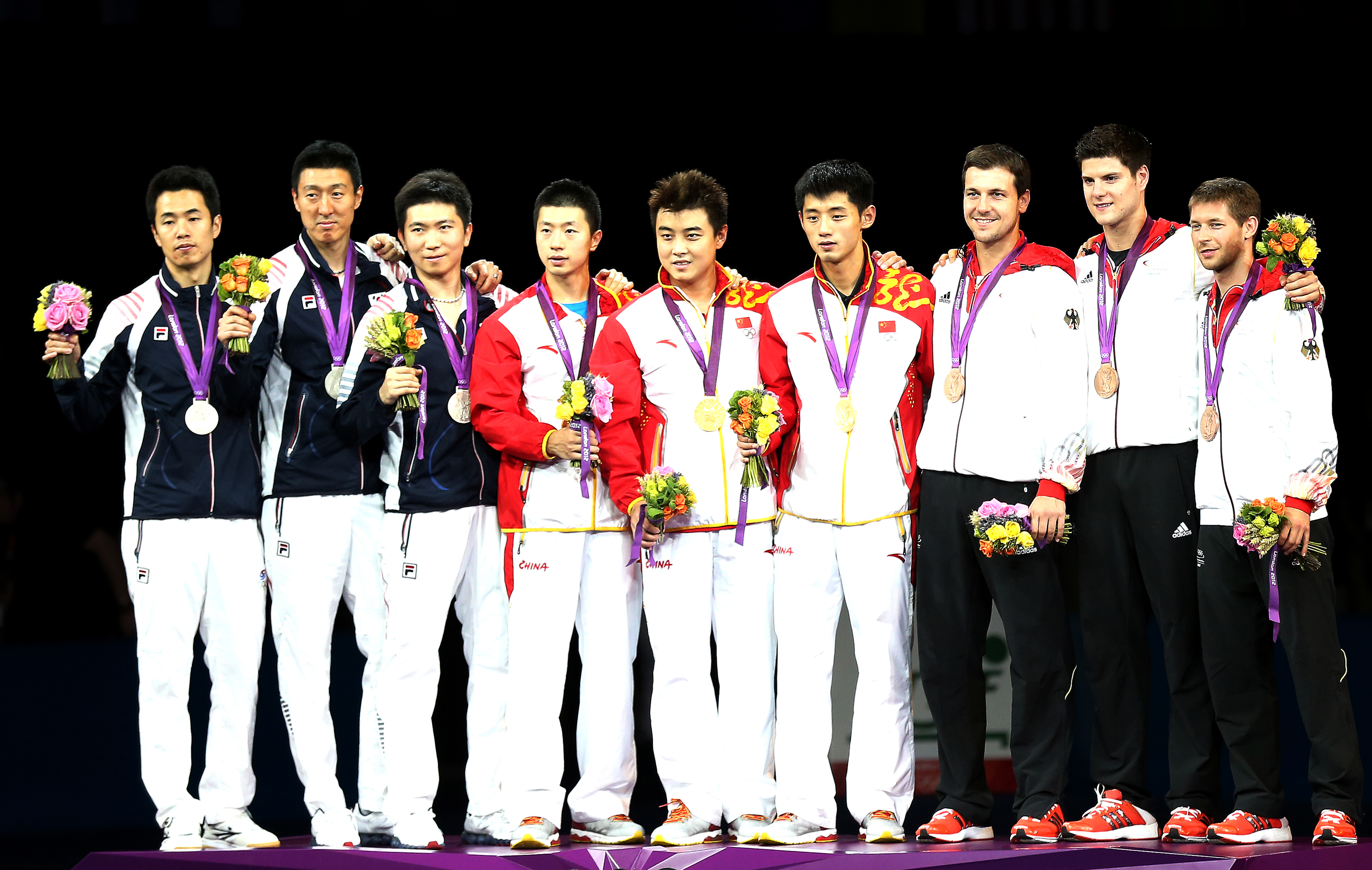
- Medalists of the event
- Venue: ExCeL London
- Date: 3 August to 8 August
- Competitors: 48 from 16 nations
- Teams: 16

Medalists
1st place, gold medalist(s)		Wang Hao; Zhang Jike; Ma Long	China
2nd place, silver medalist(s)		Oh Sang-Eun; Joo Se-Hyuk; Ryu Seung-Min	South Korea
3rd place, bronze medalist(s)		Timo Boll; Dimitrij Ovtcharov; Bastian Steger	Germany

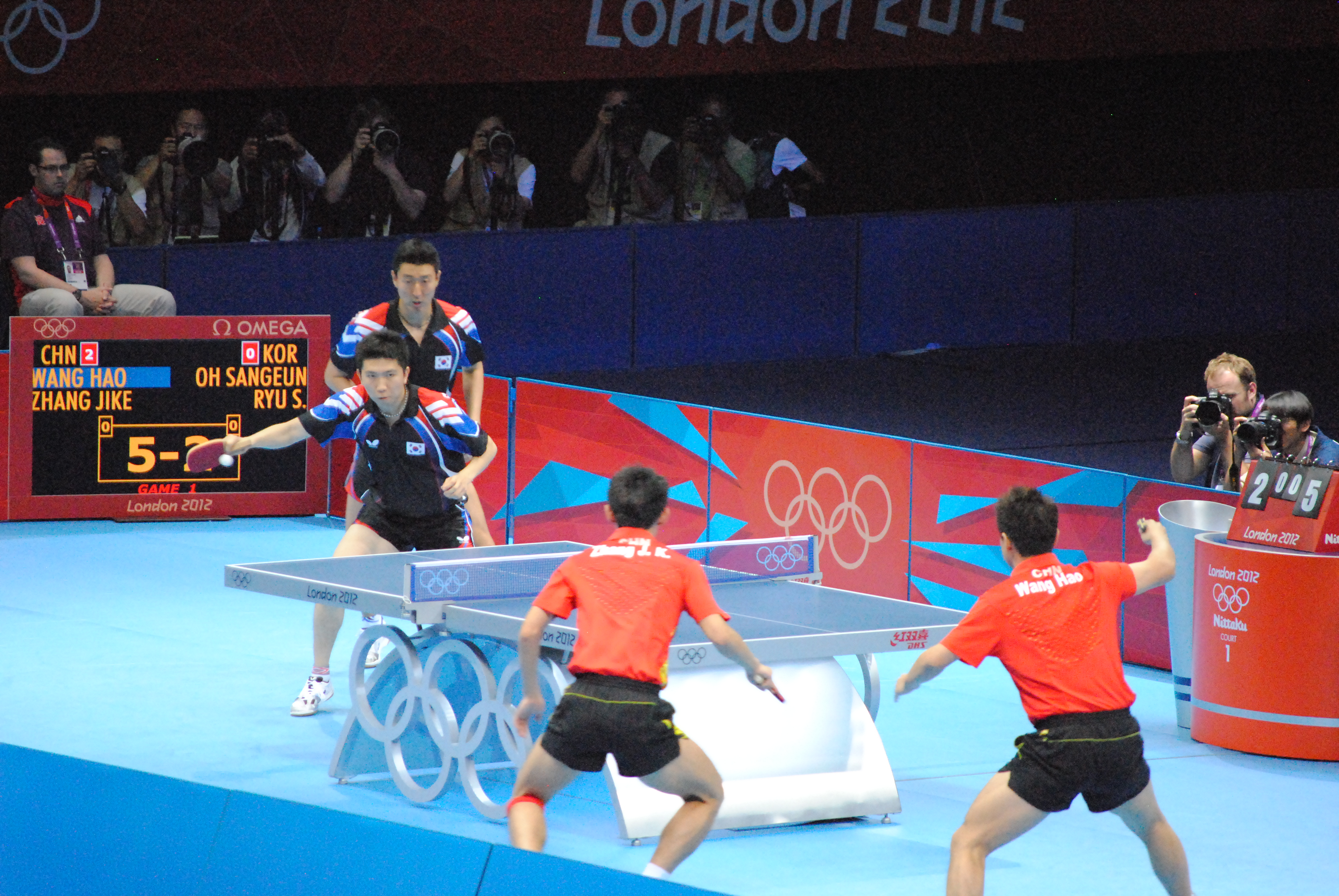
Top two seeded China and South Korea met in the gold medal match

The men's team table tennis event was part of the table tennis programme at the 2012 Summer Olympics in London. The event took place from Friday 3 August to Wednesday 8 August 2012 at ExCeL London. The tournament was a single elimination tournament with a third place playoff played between the two losing semi-finalists.

== Schedule ==
All times are British Summer Time (UTC+1).

Dates	Start time	Round
3 August	19:00	First round
4 August	10:00	First round
5 August	10:00	Quarterfinals
6 August	14:30	Semifinals
8 August	11:00	Bronze medal match
8 August	15:30	Gold medal match

== Seeds ==
Team ranking was based on the individual Ranking List of July 2012, taking into consideration those players qualified from each team.

Rank	Team	Athletes (world ranking on 4 July)		
1	China	Zhang Jike (1)	Ma Long (2)	Wang Hao (4)
2	South Korea	Joo Se-Hyuk (10)	Oh Sang-Eun (11)	Ryu Seung-Min (17)
3	Japan	Jun Mizutani (5)	Koki Niwa (16)	Seiya Kishikawa (21)
4	Germany	Timo Boll (7)	Dimitrij Ovtcharov (12)	Bastian Steger (24)
5	Singapore	Gao Ning (15)	Zhan Jian (25)	Yang Zi (54)
6	Hong Kong	Jiang Tianyi (20)	Tang Peng (32)	Leung Chu Yan (35)
7	Austria	Robert Gardos (29)	Chen Weixing (32)	Werner Schlager (47)
8	Portugal	Marcos Freitas (31)	Tiago Apolónia (34)	João Monteiro (39)
9	Russia	Alexander Shibaev (29)	Kirill Skachkov (41)	Alexey Smirnov (46)
10	Sweden	Jens Lundqvist (51)	Pär Gerell (80)	Jörgen Persson (90)
11	North Korea	Jang Song-Man (59)	Kim Hyok-Bong (77)	Kim Song-Nam (181)
12	Brazil	Gustavo Tsuboi (104)	Thiago Monteiro (126)	Hugo Hoyama (217)
13	Great Britain	Paul Drinkhall (107)	Andrew Baggaley (133)	Liam Pitchford (143)
14	Egypt	El-sayed Lashin (123)	Ahmed Saleh (157)	Omar Assar (209)
15	Canada	Eugene Wang (113)	Pierre-Luc Hinse (305)	Andre Ho (393)
16	Australia	William Henzell (130)	Justin Han (386)	Robert Frank (434)

== Bracket ==
The draw for team events took place on 25 July 2012.

First round
1	China	3
9	Russia	1
16	Australia	0
5	Singapore	3
7	Austria	3
14	Egypt	0
10	Sweden	1
4	Germany	3
3	Japan	3
15	Canada	0
12	Brazil	0
6	Hong Kong	3
8	Portugal	3
13	Great Britain	0
11	North Korea	1
2	South Korea	3

Quarterfinals
1	China	3
5	Singapore	0
7	Austria	0
4	Germany	3
3	Japan	2
6	Hong Kong	3
8	Portugal	2
2	South Korea	3

Semifinals
1	China	3
4	Germany	1
6	Hong Kong	0
2	South Korea	3

Gold medal match
1	China	3
2	South Korea	0
Bronze medal match
4	Germany	3
6	Hong Kong	1

== Results ==
=== First round ===
3 August 2012; 19:00	Austria	3–0	Egypt	Duration: 1h 19min

	Individual matches
Chen Weixing	3–1	El-sayed Lashin	7–11, 11–8, 11–9, 11–5
Werner Schlager	3–0	Ahmed Saleh	11–6, 11–3, 11–8
Robert Gardos / Chen Weixing	3–0	Omar Assar / El-sayed Lashin	11–8, 11–5, 14–12

3 August 2012; 19:00	Sweden	1–3	Germany	Duration: 2h 42min

	Individual matches
Jörgen Persson	3–1	Timo Boll	11–6, 11–7, 14–16, 11–8
Pär Gerell	2–3	Dimitrij Ovtcharov	14–16, 11–9, 11–6, 4–11, 8–11
Jens Lundqvist / Pär Gerell	0–3	Bastian Steger / Timo Boll	9–11, 8–11, 9–11
Jörgen Persson	0–3	Bastian Steger	12–14, 7–11, 10–12

3 August 2012; 19:00	Brazil	0–3	Hong Kong	Duration: 1h 19min

	Individual matches
Hugo Hoyama	1–3	Jiang Tianyi	5–11, 11–8, 6–11, 2–11
Thiago Monteiro	0–3	Tang Peng	8–11, 2–11, 9–11
Gustavo Tsuboi / Thiago Monteiro	1–3	Leung Chu Yan / Jiang Tianyi	12–10, 3–11, 5–11, 6–11

3 August 2012; 19:00	Portugal	3–0	Great Britain	Duration: 1h 43min

	Individual matches
Marcos Freitas	3–1	Paul Drinkhall	13–15, 11–6, 11–7, 11–8
João Monteiro	3–1	Liam Pitchford	9–11, 11–5, 11–7, 11–8
Tiago Apolónia / João Monteiro	3–0	Andrew Baggaley / Liam Pitchford	11–5, 11–7, 11–9

4 August 2012; 10:00	China	3–1	Russia	Duration: 2h 2min

	Individual matches
Zhang Jike	3–0	Kirill Skachkov	11–5, 12–10, 11–7
Ma Long	3–0	Alexander Shibaev	11–9, 11–5, 11–4
Wang Hao / Ma Long	2–3	Alexey Smirnov / Kirill Skachkov	8–11, 11–7, 11–6, 9–11, 6–11
Zhang Jike	3–0	Alexey Smirnov	11–8, 11–8, 11–6

4 August 2012; 10:00	Australia	0–3	Singapore	Duration: 1h 11min

	Individual matches
Justin Han	0–3	Gao Ning	5–11, 8–11, 5–11
William Henzell	0–3	Zhan Jian	8–11, 3–11, 9–11
Robert Frank / Justin Han	1–3	Yang Zi / Zhan Jian	4–11, 4–11, 11–8, 5–11

4 August 2012; 10:00	Japan	3–0	Canada	Duration: 1h 4min

	Individual matches
Jun Mizutani	3–0	Andre Ho	11–6, 11–3, 11–5
Koki Niwa	3–0	Zhen Wang	11–6, 12–10, 11–9
Seiya Kishikawa / Jun Mizutani	3–0	Pierre-Luc Hinse / Andre Ho	11–7, 11–4, 11–6

4 August 2012; 10:00	North Korea	1–3	South Korea	Duration: 2h 24min

	Individual matches
Kim Hyok-Bong	3–0	Oh Sang-Eun	11–6, 11–8, 12–10
Jang Song-Man	0–3	Joo Se-Hyuk	10–12, 3–11, 9–11
Kim Song-Nam / Jang Song-Man	1–3	Ryu Seung-Min / Oh Sang-Eun	8–11, 11–8, 12–14, 9–11
Kim Hyok-Bong	2–3	Ryu Seung-Min	11–5, 9–11, 11–9, 5–11, 3–11

=== Quarterfinals ===
5 August 2012; 10:00	China	3–0	Singapore	Duration: 1h 12min

	Individual matches
Ma Long	3–0	Gao Ning	11–4, 11–5, 11–6
Wang Hao	3–0	Zhan Jian	11–8, 11–3, 11–4
Zhang Jike / Wang Hao	3–0	Yang Zi / Zhan Jian	11–8, 11–9, 11–3

5 August 2012; 10:00	Japan	2–3	Hong Kong	Duration: 3h 16min

	Individual matches
Jun Mizutani	3–1	Jiang Tianyi	11–8, 11–9, 9–11, 11–9
Seiya Kishikawa	1–3	Tang Peng	7–11, 11–7, 9–11, 7–11
Koki Niwa / Seiya Kishikawa	1–3	Leung Chu Yan / Jiang Tianyi	11–8, 12–14, 8–11, 11–13
Jun Mizutani	3–1	Leung Chu Yan	5–11, 11–5, 13–11, 11–8
Koki Niwa	1–3	Tang Peng	11–7, 7–11, 7–11, 3–11

5 August 2012; 14:30	Austria	0–3	Germany	Duration: 1h 26min

	Individual matches
Robert Gardos	0–3	Dimitrij Ovtcharov	9–11, 8–11, 5–11
Werner Schlager	0–3	Timo Boll	7–11, 7–11, 4–11
Chen Weixing / Robert Gardos	1–3	Bastian Steger / Timo Boll	6–11, 11–13, 11–8, 4–11

5 August 2012; 14:30	Portugal	2–3	South Korea	Duration: 3h 24min

	Individual matches
Tiago Apolonia	0–3	Oh Sang-Eun	11–13, 7–11, 9–11
Marcos Freitas	3–1	Joo Se-Hyuk	16–14, 11–6, 6–11, 11–9
João Monteiro / Tiago Apolonia	3–2	Ryu Seung-Min / Oh Sang-Eun	6–11, 10–12, 11–1, 11–8, 11–7
João Monteiro	1–3	Joo Se-Hyuk	11–8, 6–11, 4–11, 10–12
Marcos Freitas	1–3	Ryu Seung-Min	5–11, 6–11, 11–9, 3–11

=== Semifinals ===
6 August 2012; 14:30	China	3–1	Germany	Duration: 2h 36min

	Individual matches
Ma Long	3–1	Dimitrij Ovtcharov	12–10, 5–11, 11–9, 11–1
Zhang Jike	1–3	Timo Boll	11–8, 8 –11, 9–11, 8–11
Wang Hao / Zhang Jike	3–1	Bastian Steger / Timo Boll	10–12, 11–8, 11–5, 11–5
Ma Long	3–0	Bastian Steger	11–3, 11–5, 11–7

6 August 2012; 19:00	Hong Kong	0–3	South Korea	Duration: 2h 4min

	Individual matches
Tang Peng	2–3	Ryu Seung-Min	11–7, 4–11, 6–11, 11–8, 9–11
Jiang Tianyi	0–3	Joo Se-Hyuk	3–11, 6–11, 8–11
Leung Chu Yan / Jiang Tianyi	2–3	Oh Sang-Eun / Ryu Seung-Min	11–5, 6–11, 2–11, 13–11, 9–11

=== Bronze medal match ===
8 August 2012; 11:00	Germany	3–1	Hong Kong	Duration: 2h 21min

	Individual matches
Timo Boll	3–0	Leung Chu Yan	11–6, 11–3, 11–7
Dimitrij Ovtcharov	3–1	Tang Peng	13–11, 11–13, 11–9, 11–9
Bastian Steger / Dimitrij Ovtcharov	0–3	Jiang Tianyi / Leung Chu Yan	10–12, 8–11, 4–11
Timo Boll	3–1	Jiang Tianyi	9–11, 11–5, 11–9, 11–9

=== Gold medal match ===
8 August 2012; 15:30	China	3–0	South Korea	Duration: 1h 50min

	Individual matches
Ma Long	3–1	Ryu Seung-Min	11–6, 11–6‚ 6–11, 11–4
Zhang Jike	3–1	Joo Se-Hyuk	11–9, 5–11, 11–6, 11–8
Wang Hao / Zhang Jike	3–0	Oh Sang-Eun / Ryu Seung-Min	11–4, 11–8, 11–6
