= China Table Tennis Super League =

Top table tennis league in China

China Table Tennis Super League (Chinese: 中国乒乓球超级联赛, CTTSL) is the top table tennis division under the Chinese Table Tennis Association.

The last finisher of the CTTSL will be relegated to the China Table Tennis Jia League A Group. The top two finishers of the Jia League A Group will have extra games with the second last finishers of the CTTSL for two positions in the CTTSL.

== Teams ==
=== Men's league ===
2023 China Table Tennis Super League Teams:

- Shandong Luneng TTC – Ma Long, Xu Yingbin, Yuan Licen, Liu Dingshuo, Yan An
- Shanghai Zhongxing TTC – Fan Zhendong, Zhou Kai, Xu Xin, Zhao Zihao, Sun Zheng
- Huangshi TTC – Xiang Peng, Lin Shidong, Xue Fei, Wei Shihao
- Shandong Weiqiao TTC – Wang Chuqin, Liang Jingkun, Zhou Qihao, Yu Ziyang
- Lexuan Sports Group TTC – Truls Möregardh, Liang Yanning, Zhou Yu, Gao Yang, Sai Linwei
- Shantou Mingrun TTC – Lin Gaoyuan, Xu Haidong, Ma Te, Li Yijie
- Sichuan TTC – Sun Wen, Leng Dapeng, Yan Sheng, Zhu Linfeng, Cao Wei
- Shenzhen Baoan TTC – Xu Chenhao, Niu Guankai, Liu Yebo, Cheng Jingqi
- Jiangsu Zhongchao TTC – Zhao Zhaoyan, Lin Chen, Sun Jiayi, Yang Shuo, Quan Kaiyuan

2015 China Table Tennis Super League Teams:

- Luneng - Zhang Jike, Hao Shuai, Zhang Chao, Fang Bo, Wu Hao
- Jiangsu - Zheng Peifeng, Kong Lingxuan, Lin Chen, Dimitrij Ovtcharov, Kim Minseok
- Ningbo - Ma Long, Yan An, Lin Gaoyuan, Lvy Xiang
- Bayi - Fan Zhendong, Zhou Yu, Xu Chenhao, Zhou Kai, Zhang Yang
- Shanghai - Xu Xin, Shang Kun, Zhao Zihao, Chen Zhiyang, Zhang Yang
- Weiqiao - Liang Jingkun, Cui Qinglei, Yu Ziyang, Zhang Yudong, Liu Yi, Zhao Qihao, Timo Boll
- Tianjin - Ma Te, Liu Dingshuo, Wei Shihao, Chuang Chih Yuan
- Guangdong - Liu Jikang, Yin Hang, Liu Yanan, Joo Saehyuk, Wong Chun Ting
- Bazhou - Ren Hao, Zhai Chao, Cheng Jingqi, Fan Shengpeng, Wang Chuqin, Stephane Ouaiche
- Sichuan - Xu Ruifeng, Zhu Linfeng, Lai Jiaxin, Tang Yushi, Chen Chien An

2014 China Table Tennis Super League Teams:

- Bazhou Hairun (霸州海润) playing in Bazhou City, Hebei
- Bayi Dashang (八一大商) playing in Dalian, Liaoning
- Guangdong Chenjing (广东陈静) playing in Guangzhou, Guangdong
- Jiangsu Zhongchao (江苏中超) playing in Changzhou, Jiangsu or Huai'an, Jiangsu
- Ningbo Haitian (宁波海天) playing in Anji County, Zhejiang or Wenzhou, Zhejiang
- Shandong Luneng (山东鲁能) playing in Jinan, Shandong
- Shandong Weiqiao (山东魏桥) playing in Binzhou, Shandong
- Shanghai Juneyao (上海均瑶) playing in Shanghai
- Sichuan Changhong (四川长虹) playing in Shifang, Sichuan
- Tianjin Hao'an (天津豪安) playing in Tianjin

2008 China Table Tennis Super League Teams:

- Zhe Shang Bank (浙商银行) playing in Hangzhou City, Zhejiang
- Bayi Gongshang Bank (八一工商银行) playing in Dalian, Liaoning
- Jinzhou Bank (锦州银行) playing in Jinzhou, Liaoning
- Haining Pegecheng Hong Xiang (海宁皮革城鸿翔) playing in Haining, Zhejiang
- Ningbo Beilun Haitian (宁波北仑海天) playing in Anji County, Zhejiang or Wenzhou, Zhejiang
- Luneng Zhongchao Dianlan (鲁能中超电缆) playing in Jinan, Shandong
- Jiangsu Jiangnan Dianlan (江苏江南电缆) playing in Yixing, Jiangsu
- Shanghai Gaunshengyuan (上海冠生园) playing in Shanghai
- Sichuan Quanxing (四川全兴) playing in Shifang, Sichuan

=== Women's league ===
In 2014, the 10 teams are:

- Bayi Jizhong (八一冀中) playing in Dongping County, Shandong
- Beijing Shougang (北京首钢) playing in Weishan County, Shandong or Beijing
- Churin Leadfoods (秋林格瓦斯) playing in Changchun, Jilin
- Dalian Haichang (大连海昌) playing in Dalian, Liaoning
- Datong Jindi (大同金地) playing in Datong, Shanxi
- Guangdong Ersha (广东二沙) playing in Guangzhou, Guangdong
- Jinhua Bank (金华银行) playing in Jinhua, Zhejiang
- Ordos Eastern Road and Bridge (鄂尔多斯东方路桥) playing in Ejin Horo Banner, Inner Mongolia
- Shandong Luneng (山东鲁能) playing in Jinan, Shandong
- Shanxi Datuhe (山西大土河) playing in Lüliang, Shanxi

== Foreign players ==
A number of foreign players have played in the league. In 2023 only one foreign player is active in the Chinese super league.

=== Foreign-born players ===
Men's league

- Belarus: Vladimir Samsonov (2006)
- Belgium: Jean-Michel Saive (2006)
- Chinese Taipei: Chuang Chih-yuan (2006, 2009–2010, 2013–2014), Chiang Peng-lung (2000/01–2002, 2005–2006)
- Denmark: Michael Maze (2005)
- Germany: Timo Boll (2005–2006, 2011, 2013–2014), Dimitrij Ovtcharov (2013–2014)
- Japan: Jun Mizutani (2008, 2010–2011), Kōji Matsushita (2005)
- Romania: Adrian Crișan (2006)
- South Korea: Joo Se-hyuk (2003/04–2006, 2009–2014), Oh Sang-eun (2005–2006, 2008, 2010), Ryu Seung-min (2000/01, 2005–2006), Lee Jung-woo (2006)
- Sweden: Jörgen Persson (2002, 2012), Truls Möregårdh (2023)

Women's league

- Chinese Taipei: Cheng I-ching (2013–2014), Huang Yi-hua (2002)
- Croatia: Tamara Boroš (2006)
- Japan: Ai Fukuhara (2005–2006, 2010–2011), An Konishi (2000/01–2005), Yuka Nishii (2002), Miu Hirano (2016)
- North Korea: Ri Myong-sun (2014)
- South Korea: Kim Kyung-ah (2009–2011)
- United States: Ariel Hsing (2014)

=== Naturalized Chinese players ===
There have also been many players from Mainland China, who at some point in his or her career became a citizen of another country or territory.

Men's league

- Canada: Wenguan Johnny Huang
- Hong Kong: Jiang Tianyi, Cheung Yuk, Ko Lai Chak, Tang Peng, Li Ching, Leung Chu Yan
- Japan: Yo Kan, Kazuhiro Chan, Kaii Yoshida
- Singapore: Yin Jingyuan, Yang Zi, Gao Ning, Li Hu, Zhan Jian
- Slovakia: Wang Yang

Women's league

- Australia: Miao Miao, Jian Fang Lay,
- Austria: Li Qiangbing
- Chinese Taipei: Chen Jing
- Germany: Shan Xiaona (also a Singaporean citizen at one point)
- Hong Kong: Tie Ya Na, Jiang Huajun, Lin Ling, Zhang Rui
- Netherlands: Li Jiao
- New Zealand: Li Chunli, Karen Li
- Singapore: Yu Mengyu, Feng Tianwei, Li Jiawei, Wang Yuegu, Jing Junhong, Shan Xiaona (later a German citizen)
- South Korea: Seok Ha-jung, Dang Ye-seo
- United States: Gao Jun

=== Chinese players ===
Men's league

Zhang Jike, Zhang Chao (table tennis), Ma Lin,  Fang Bo, Song Hongyuan, Li Muqiao, Wang Hao, Lei Zhenhua, Hao Shuai, Xu Xin, Qiu Yike, Wei Yan Tao, Zhang Yibo, Shan Xiaona, Ma Long, Wang Jianjun, Han Yang
