= Shen Qiang =

Canadian table tennis player

Personal information
- Nationality: Canada
- Born: May 11, 1990 (age 36) Jixi, Heilongjiang, China
- Height: 1.63 m (5 ft 4 in)
- Weight: 60 kg (132 lb)

Sport
- Sport: Table tennis
- Club: National Table Tennis; Centre
- Playing style: Right-handed, shakehand
- Equipment: Butterfly Sriver FX
- Highest ranking: 333 (November 2008)
- Current ranking: 366 (August 2010)
Medal record
Men's table tennis
Representing Canada
Pan American Games
Bronze medal – third place	2007 Rio de Janeiro	Team

Shen Qiang (simplified Chinese: 沈强; traditional Chinese: 沈強; pinyin: Shěn Qiáng; born May 11, 1990, in Jixi, Heilongjiang, People's Republic of China) is a Canadian table tennis player of Chinese origin. As of August 2010, Shen is ranked no. 366 in the world by the International Table Tennis Federation (ITTF). He is also right-handed, and uses the shakehand grip.

Shen started his sporting career, when he became a member of the provincial table tennis team in Heilongjiang at the age of eleven. He set an early success by winning the 12-and-under division in the men's singles at the national table tennis championships, before he moved with his family to Ottawa, Ontario, Canada in 2004. Despite his lack of English, Shen obtained citizenship, studied at Glebe Collegiate Institute, and worked as a resident athlete for the National Table Tennis Centre, under his personal and head coach Marles Martins. Shen made his international debut at the 2007 Pan American Games in Rio de Janeiro, where he earned a bronze medal, along with his fellow table tennis players Pradeeban Peter-Paul and Pierre-Luc Hinse, in the men's team event.

Shen qualified for the inaugural men's team event at the 2008 Summer Olympics in Beijing, by receiving a continental spot for the Americas from ITTF's Computer Team Ranking List. Shen and his teammates Pradeeban Peter-Paul and Wilson Zhang placed fourth in the preliminary pool round, against Germany, Croatia, and Singapore, receiving a total of three points and three straight losses.
