= Wilson Zhang =

Canadian table tennis player

Personal information
- Full name: Zhang Peng
- Nationality: Canada
- Born: 23 September 1979 (age 46) Anda, Heilongjiang, China
- Height: 1.63 m (5 ft 4 in)
- Weight: 65 kg (143 lb)

Sport
- Sport: Table tennis
- Club: National Table Tennis; Centre
- Playing style: Right-handed, shakehand
- Equipment: Butterfly Korbel
- Highest ranking: 99 (February 2007)
- Current ranking: 140 (January 2010)

Wilson Zhang (also Zhang Peng, simplified Chinese: 章鹏; traditional Chinese: 章鵬; pinyin: Zhāng Péng; born 23 September 1979 in Anda, Heilongjiang, People's Republic of China) is a Canadian table tennis player of Chinese origin. As of January 2010, Zhang is ranked no. 140 in the world by the International Table Tennis Federation (ITTF). He is right-handed, and uses the shakehand grip.

In 2003, Zhang moved with his family to Richmond, British Columbia, Canada, where he worked as a full-time table tennis coach at the Bridgeport Sports Club. He also met and married a Canadian and now has two children, and finally resided to Ottawa, Ontario, where he obtained a citizenship four years later, and eventually trained for the National Table Tennis Centre under his personal and head coach Marles Martins. Zhang also reigned as Canadian table tennis champion for three straight years (2005–2007), finished second at the 2007 U.S. Open in Las Vegas, Nevada, and most significantly, attained the championship title at the North American Tour finals.

Zhang earned a spot on the Canadian team for the 2008 Summer Olympics in Beijing, by placing second over his teammate Pradeeban Peter-Paul in the men's singles from the North American Qualification Tournament in Vancouver. Zhang joined with his fellow players Peter-Paul and Qiang Zhen for the inaugural men's team event. His team placed fourth in the preliminary pool round, against Germany, Croatia, and Singapore, receiving a total of three points and three straight losses. In the men's singles, Zhang defeated Trinidad and Tobago's Dexter St. Louis in the preliminary round, before losing his next match to Japan's Seiya Kishikawa, attaining a set score of 2–4.
