= Kyle Davis (table tennis) =

Australian table tennis player

Personal information
- Full name: Kyle Davis
- Nickname: Rooner
- Nationality: Australia
- Born: 18 January 1989 (age 37) Melbourne, Australia
- Height: 1.78 m (5 ft 10 in)
- Weight: 74 kg (163 lb)

Sport
- Sport: Table tennis
- Club: Melbourne Sports and Aquatic Centre
- Playing style: Right-handed, classic
- Equipment: Butterfly Jonyer
- Highest ranking: 401 (December 2008)
- Current ranking: 473 (October 2011)

Kyle Davis (born 18 January 1989, in Melbourne) is an Australian table tennis player. He was selected to represent his nation, Australia, at the 2008 Summer Olympics and at the 2010 Commonwealth Games in Delhi, India. As of October 2011, Davis is ranked no. 401 in the world by the International Table Tennis Federation (ITTF). He is also right-handed, and uses the classic grip and Butterfly Jonyer blade.

Since becoming a member of the national team in 2004, Davis is considered one of Australia's most promising table tennis players in its sporting history. He has obtained thirty-six age-group Australian titles in both the singles and doubles tournaments, and finished fourth in the men's doubles at the Australian Youth Olympic Festival. In 2007, Davis picked up a silver medal at the peak of his career in the men's singles at the Commonwealth Championships in Jaipur, India.

Davis qualified for the Australian squad, as a 19-year-old teen, in two table tennis events at the 2008 Summer Olympics in Beijing, by placing second in the men's singles from the Oceania Qualification Tournament in Noumea, and receiving a continental spot for Oceania in the men's team under ITTF's Computer Team Ranking List. Joining his fellow players William Henzell and David Zalcberg in the inaugural men's team event, Davis and his Australian squad finished on the bottom of the prelim pool with three straight defeats against Greece, Austria, and the host nation China. A few days later, in the men's singles, Davis lost his opening match to Egypt's Ahmed Ali Saleh with a set score 1–4.
