= Daniel Tsiokas =

Greek table tennis player (born 1971)

Personal information
- Nationality: Greek
- Born: Daniel Cioca; 19 June 1971 (age 55) Cluj-Napoca, Romania
- Height: 1.80 m (5 ft 11 in)
- Weight: 68 kg (150 lb)

Sport
- Sport: Table tennis
- Club: Sport Athlétique Gazinet- Cestas (FRA)
- Playing style: Right-handed, defensive
- Highest ranking: 55 (February 2001)

Daniel Tsiokas (Greek: Ντανιελ Τσιόκας; born Daniel Cioca, 19 June 1971 in Cluj-Napoca, Romania), also known as Ntaniel Tsiokas, is a Greek table tennis player of Romanian origin. As of July 2009, Tsiokas is ranked no. 121 in the world by the International Table Tennis Federation (ITTF). Tsiokas is a member of Gazinet-Cestas Athletic Sport Club (French: Sport Athlétique Gazinet-Cestas) in Cestas, France, and is coached and trained by Nikolaos Kostapoulos. Tsiokas also competed in the men's singles and doubles at the 1996 Summer Olympics in Atlanta, Georgia, and at the 2000 Summer Olympics in Sydney, but he failed to advance into the succeeding rounds after his first preliminary match.

Eight years after competing in his last Olympics, Tsiokas qualified for his third Greek team, as a 37-year-old, at the 2008 Summer Olympics in Beijing, by earning an entry score of 23,769.25 points, and receiving a spot as one of the remaining top 10 teams from ITTF's Computer Team Ranking List. He joined his fellow players, and Olympic veterans, Kalinikos Kreanga and Panagiotis Gionis for the inaugural men's team event. Tsiokas and his team placed third in the preliminary pool, with a total score of four points, two defeats from China and Austria, and a single victory over the Australian team (led by William Henzell).
