= Yo Kan =

Japanese table tennis player

Personal information
- Nationality: Japan
- Born: 19 October 1978 (age 47) Shenyang, Liaoning, China
- Height: 1.81 m (5 ft 11 1/2 in)
- Weight: 82 kg (181 lb)

Sport
- Sport: Table tennis
- Club: Tokyo Art
- Playing style: Right-handed, penhold
- Highest ranking: 17 (April 2008)
- Current ranking: 99 (December 2012)
Medal record
Men's table tennis
Representing Japan
ITTF Pro Tour
Gold medal – first place	2007 Belo Horizonte	Singles
Gold medal – first place	2007 Santiago	Singles

Yo Kan (韓陽, Kan Yo; born October 19, 1978 in Shenyang, Liaoning), or Han Yang in Chinese, is a Japanese table tennis player of Chinese origin. He won two gold medals in the men's singles at the 2007 ITTF Pro Tour series in Belo Horizonte, Brazil, and in Santiago, Chile. As of December 2012, Kan is ranked no. 99 in the world by the International Table Tennis Federation (ITTF). Kan is a member of the table tennis team for Tokyo Art Club in Tokyo, Japan, and is coached and trained by Ryo Yuzawa. Kan is also right-handed, and uses offensive, penhold grip.

Representing his adopted nation Japan, Kan qualified for the men's singles at the 2008 Summer Olympics in Beijing, by earning an entry score of 12,000.75 points, and being selected as one of the top 15 seeded players from ITTF's Computer Team Ranking List. He received three byes in the preliminary rounds, before defeating Russia's Alexei Smirnov in the fourth match. Kan progressed to the round of sixteen match, where he lost to Chinese table tennis player and Olympic silver medalist Wang Hao, with a set-score of 1–4.

Kan also joined with his fellow players Seiya Kishikawa and Jun Mizutani for the inaugural men's team event. He and his team progressed to the knock-out stage by winning the preliminary pool round against Hong Kong, Nigeria, and Russia, with a total of six points and three straight victories. They lost the semi-final match to the German team (led by Dimitrij Ovtcharov), with a sudden death set score of 2–3, but offered another shot for the bronze medal by entering the play-offs. Kan and his team, however, were defeated in the second play-off by the Austrian trio Chen Weixing, Robert Gardos, and former world champion Werner Schlager, with a set score of 1–3.
