= Tan Ruiwu =

Croatian table tennis player

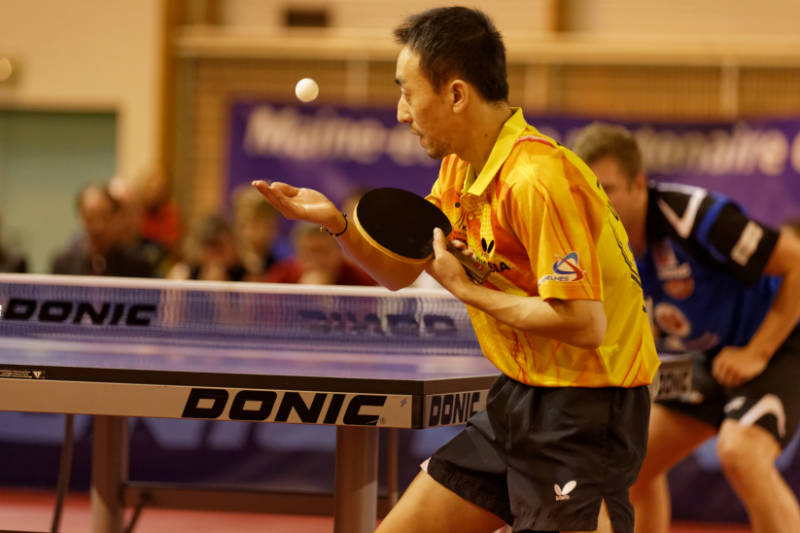
- Tan Ruiwu

Personal information
- Native name: 谭瑞午
- Nationality: Croatia
- Born: 30 June 1983 (age 43) Shenyang, China
- Height: 1.64 m (5 ft 4 1/2 in)
- Weight: 50 kg (110 lb)

Sport
- Sport: Table tennis
- Playing style: Left-handed, shakehand grip
- Highest ranking: 48 (December 2012)

Tan Ruiwu (Chinese: 谭瑞午; pinyin: Tán Ruìwǔ; born 30 June 1983) is a Croatian table tennis player born in China. As of December 2012, he is ranked no. 48 in the world by the International Table Tennis Federation (ITTF). He is also left-handed, and uses the shakehand grip.

Tan represented his adopted nation Croatia at the 2008 Summer Olympics in Beijing, where he competed for the singles and team events. In his first event, men's singles, Tan received two byes in the preliminary rounds, before defeating Japan's Seiya Kishikawa, Singapore's Gao Ning, and Hong Kong's Li Ching. He reached the quarterfinal round of the competition, where he lost to China's Wang Liqin, with a unanimous set score of 0–4. Few days later, Tan joined the national team, with his fellow players Andrej Gaćina and six-time Olympic veteran Zoran Primorac, for the inaugural men's team event. He and his team placed second in the preliminary pool, with two victories and a single defeat from the German team (led by Dimitrij Ovtcharov), but was offered a second chance for the bronze medal by entering the playoffs. Tan and his team, however, lost their first playoff to the Austrian team, with a set score of 1–3.

== 2020 Superleague incident in Dubrovnik ==
During the Tennis Superleague match held in Dubrovnik, Croatia on 15 February 2020, fans of the opposing team began insulting Tan Ruiwu, referring to him as the coronavirus. Even the manager used such expressions. On 17 February 2020, the team apologized and all racist comments were deleted afterwards.
