= Chinese Table Tennis Association =

Governing body of table tennis in China

Chinese Table Tennis Association (Chinese: 中国乒乓球协会) is a national non-governmental, nonprofit sports organization in the People's Republic of China. It represents China in the International Table Tennis Federation and the Asian Table Tennis Union, as well as the table tennis sports in the All-China Sports Federation. As of 2025, its president is Wang Liqin.

== See also ==
- China Table Tennis Super League
