= Dmitry Mazunov =

Russian table tennis player (born 1971)

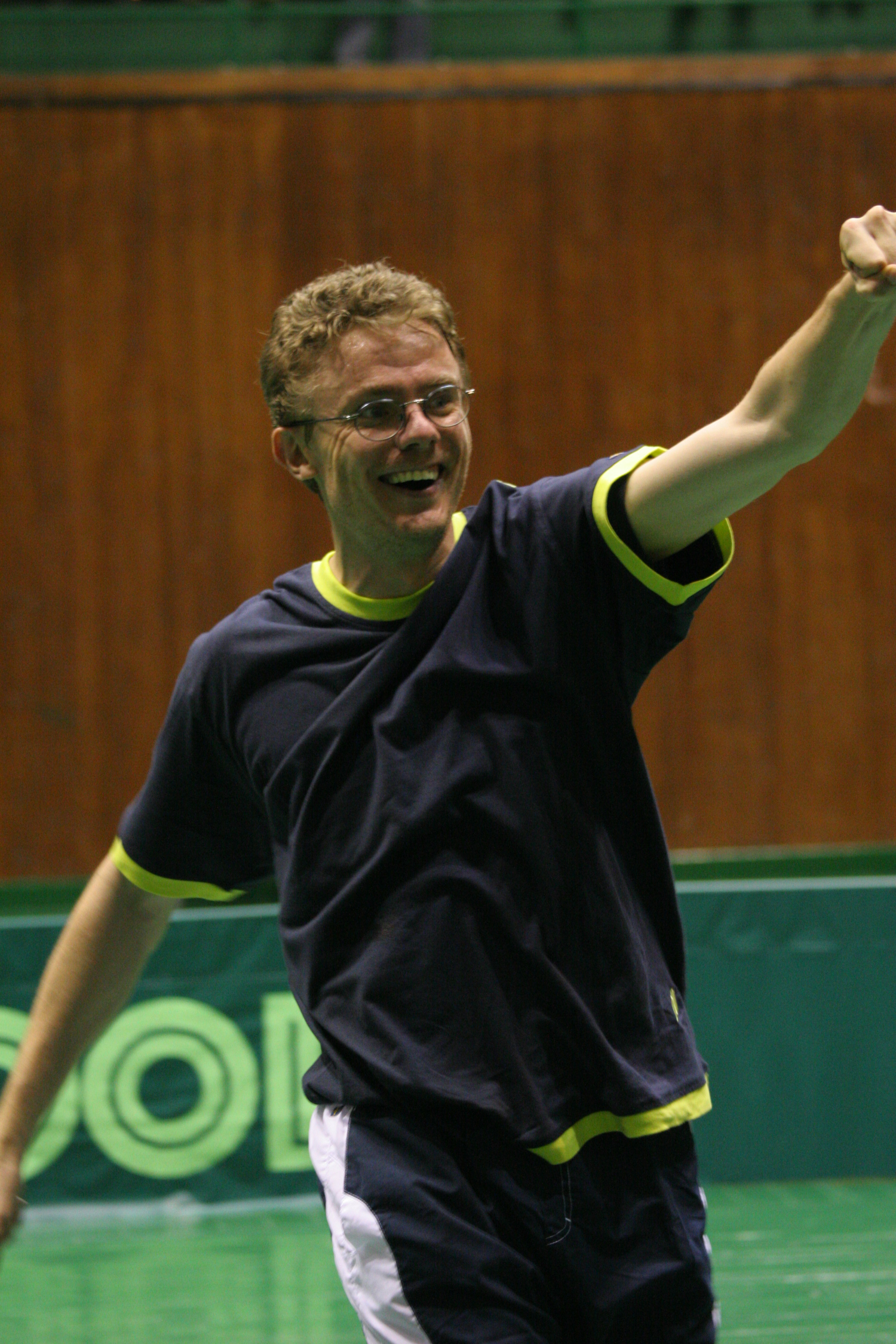

Personal information
- Full name: Dmitriy Vyacheslavovich; Mazunov
- Nationality: Russia
- Born: 12 May 1971 (age 55) Nizhny Novgorod, Russian SFSR, Soviet Union
- Height: 1.65 m (5 ft 5 in)
- Weight: 58 kg (128 lb)

Sport
- Sport: Table tennis
- Club: TTF Ochsenhausen (GER)
- Playing style: Right-handed, attacking
- Highest ranking: 50 (January 2001)
- Current ranking: 105 (January 2010)
Medal record
Men's table tennis
World Championships
Representing Soviet Union
Bronze medal – third place	1991 Chiba	Doubles
World Cup
Representing Russia
Silver medal – second place	1992 Las Vegas	Doubles
European Championships
Representing Soviet Union
Bronze medal – third place	1990 Gothenburg	Doubles
Representing Russia
Silver medal – second place	2003 Courmayeur	Doubles
Bronze medal – third place	2005 Aarhus	Doubles
Bronze medal – third place	2007 Belgrade	Doubles
ITTF Pro Tour
Representing Russia
Bronze medal – third place	2002 Eindhoven	Doubles
Bronze medal – third place	2004 Warsaw	Doubles
Silver medal – second place	2008 Velenje	Doubles

Dmitry Vyacheslavovich Mazunov (Russian: Дмитрий Вячеславович Мазунов; born 12 May 1971 in Nizhny Novgorod, Russian SFSR) is a Russian table tennis player. He won a bronze medal, along with his brother Andrey Mazunov, in the men's doubles at the 1991 World Table Tennis Championships in Chiba, Japan, representing the Soviet Union. As of January 2010, Mazunov is ranked no. 105 in the world by the International Table Tennis Federation (ITTF). Mazunov is a member of TTF Liebherr Ochenhausen in Ochsenhausen, Germany, and is coached and trained by Mikhail Nosov. He is also right-handed, and uses the attacking grip.

== Table tennis career ==
Mazunov made his official debut, as a member of the Unified Team, at the 1992 Summer Olympics in Barcelona, where he competed in both the singles and doubles tournaments. He placed third in the preliminary pool round of the men's singles, with a total score of 114 points, two defeats from Belgium's Jean-Michel Saive and Brazil's Hugo Hoyama, and a single victory over Iran's Ibrahim Al-Idokht. In the men's doubles, Mazunov and his brother Andrey lost the quarterfinal match to South Korea's Kim Taek-Soo and Yoo Nam-Kyu, with a set score of 0–3.

Representing Russia at the 1996 Summer Olympics in Atlanta, Mazunov lost the first round match of the men's singles to Belarus' Vladimir Samsonov, with a set score of 0–3. In the men's doubles, Mazunov and his partner Andrey placed second in the preliminary pool round, receiving a total score of 120 points, two victories from Belarus and the United States, and a single defeat from the South Korean duo Lee Chul-Seung and Yoo Nam-Kyu.

At the 2004 Summer Olympics in Athens, Mazunov teamed up with Alexei Smirnov in the men's doubles tournament. The Russian pair narrowly lost the bronze medal to the Danish duo Michael Maze and Finn Tugwell, receiving a final set score of 2–4.

Sixteen years after competing in his first Olympics, Mazunov qualified for his fourth Russian team, as a 37-year-old, at the 2008 Summer Olympics in Beijing, by receiving a spot as one of the remaining top 10 teams under ITTF's Computer Team Ranking List. He joined with his fellow players Alexei Smirnov and Fedor Kuzmin for the inaugural men's team event. Mazunov and his team placed fourth in the preliminary pool round against Japan, Hong Kong, and Nigeria, receiving a total score of three points and three straight losses.
