= Fedor Kuzmin =

Russian table tennis player

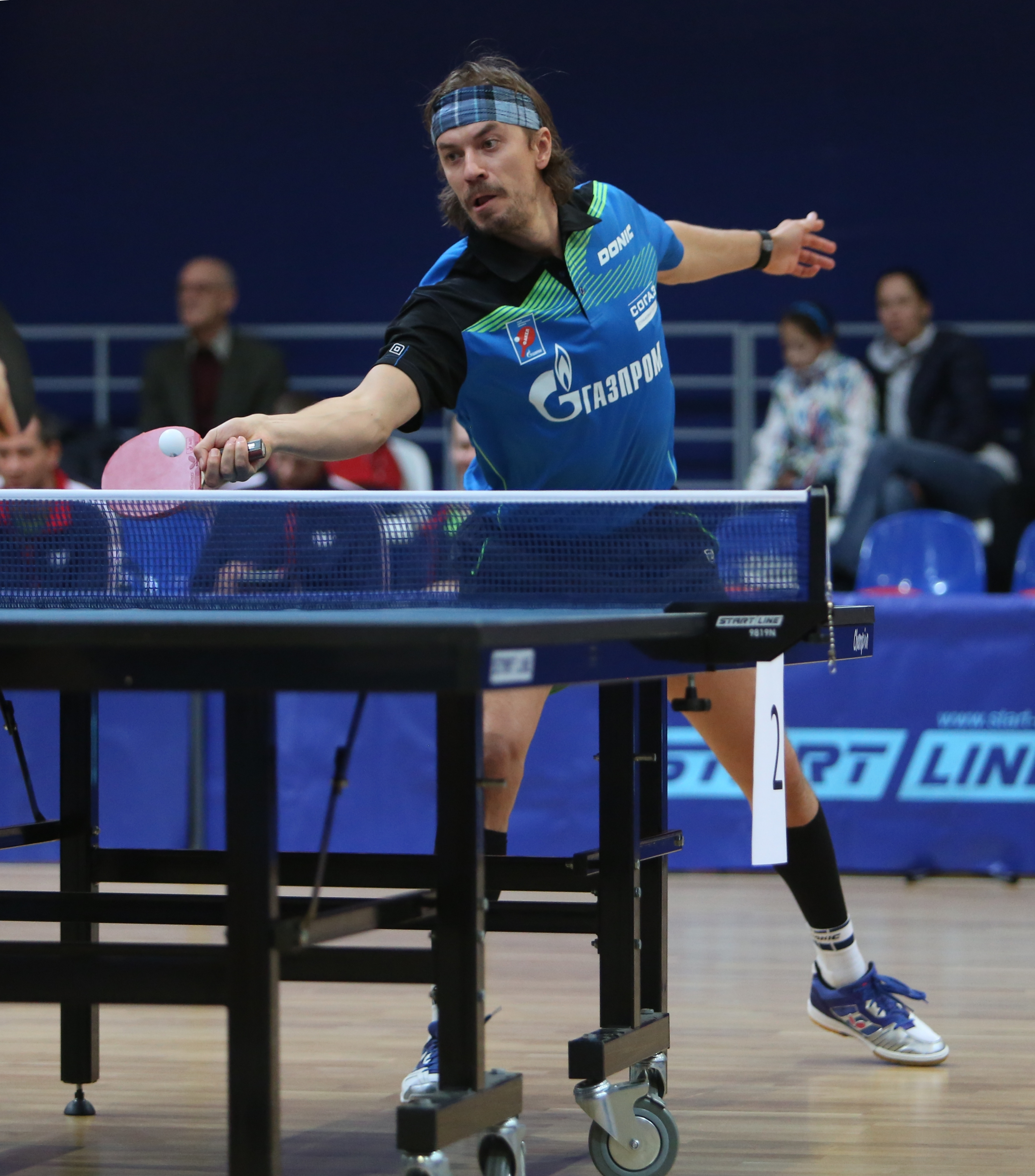

Personal information
- Full name: Fyodor Sergeyevich Kuzmin
- Nationality: Russia
- Born: 17 April 1983 (age 43) Rybinsk, Russian SFSR, Soviet Union
- Height: 1.78 m (5 ft 10 in)
- Weight: 72 kg (159 lb)

Sport
- Sport: Table tennis
- Club: Fakel Gazproma
- Playing style: Right-handed, classic
- Highest ranking: 30 (April 2005)
- Current ranking: 164 (October 2014)
Medal record
Men's table tennis
Representing Russia
European Championships
| Silver medal – second place | 2007 Belgrad | Mixed |
| Bronze medal – third place | 2009 Stuttgart | Singles |
ITTF Pro Tour
| Gold medal – first place | 2008 Velenje | Singles |

Fyodor Sergeyevich Kuzmin (also Fedor Kuzmin, Russian: Фёдор Серге́евич Кузьмин; born 17 April 1983 in Rybinsk, Russian SFSR) is a Russian table tennis player. Kuzmin won a gold medal in the men's singles at the 2005 ITTF Pro Tour series in Velenje, Slovenia. He also captured a silver medal, along with his partner Oksana Fadeyeva, in the mixed doubles at the 2007 European Championships in Belgrade, Serbia, losing out to the defending Eastern European pair Aleksandar Karakašević (Serbia) and Rūta Paškauskienė (Lithuania). As of October 2014, Kuzmin is ranked no. 164 in the world by the International Table Tennis Federation (ITTF). He is also right-handed, and uses the classic grip.

Kuzmin qualified for the men's singles tournament at the 2008 Summer Olympics in Beijing, by receiving a place as one of the top 8 seeded players from the European Qualification Tournament in Nantes, France. He received a single bye for the first round match, before losing out to Italy's Mihai Bobocica, with a set score of 1–4. Kuzmin also joined with his fellow players Alexei Smirnov and four-time Olympian Dmitry Mazunov for the inaugural men's team event. Kuzmin and his team placed fourth in the preliminary pool round against Japan, Hong Kong, and Nigeria, receiving a total score of three points and three straight losses.
