= Yoon Jae-young =

South Korean table tennis player

Personal information
- Nationality: South Korea
- Born: 5 February 1983 (age 43) Seoul, South Korea

Sport
- Sport: Table tennis
Medal record
Men's table tennis
Representing South Korea
Olympic Games
Bronze medal – third place	2008 Beijing	Team
Asian Games
Silver medal – second place	2006 Doha	Team

Yoon Jae-Young (Korean pronunciation: [jun.dʑɛ̝.jʌŋ]; born February 5, 1983) is a South Korean table tennis player. He won a bronze medal with the South Korean men's team at the 2008 Summer Olympics.
