= David Zalcberg =

Australian table tennis player

David Zalcberg ([zaltsberg]?) (born 4 May 1981, Melbourne, Victoria) is a left-handed Australian former table tennis player.

== Table tennis career ==
Zalcberg began playing table tennis at age of 12. He represented Australia at the 1997 Maccabiah Games in Israel. He was part of the Australian delegation that was involved in the tragic bridge collapse during the opening ceremony of the games.

In 2003, Zalcberg competed in the World Table Tennis Championships in singles. He competed with the Australian national team in the 2004 World Teams Championships. They finished 37th.

=== Career highlights ===
International

- Athens Olympics – Round of 32 Men's doubles
- Gold Medal, Oceania Games, Men's Doubles, 2004
- Bronze Medal, Commonwealth Games, Team event, 2004
- 2006 Commonwealth Games, where in spite of being injured, he defeated a highly favored opponent from Singapore
- Silver Medal, Finland Open, Team event, 2005

National

- Australian Under 20 Singles & Doubles Champion 2001
- Australian Men's Doubles Champion 2005

=== Highest rankings ===
- National: 4th Singles 2004. 1st Doubles 2005.
- International: World Teams Championships 2004 – ranked 37th

=== Awards ===
Zalcberg was named Maccabi Australia sportsman of the year in March 2007.

== See also ==
- Australia at the 2006 Commonwealth Games
- Table tennis at the 2004 Summer Olympics – Men's doubles
- Mount Scopus Memorial College
