= Pradeeban Peter-Paul =

Canadian table tennis player

Personal information
- Full name: Pradeeban Peter-Paul
- Nationality: Canadian
- Born: May 17, 1977 (age 49) Colombo, Sri Lanka
- Height: 6 ft 0 in (183 cm)
- Weight: 165 lb (75 kg)

Sport
- Sport: Table tennis
- Playing style: Shakehand
- Equipment: Butterfly Gergely 21, Bryce Hard max
Medal record
Men's table tennis
Representing Canada
Pan American Games
Bronze medal – third place	1999 Winnipeg	Team
Bronze medal – third place	2007 Rio de Janeiro	Team

Pradeeban Peter-Paul (born May 17, 1977) is a Tamil Canadian table tennis player.

Born in Colombo, Sri Lanka, Pradeeban Peter-Paul emigrated with his family to Germany at the age of 11. It was in Würzburg, Germany that Peter-Paul learned table tennis. When he left Germany in 1993 he was on the Bavarian provincial team and had won a junior doubles title. He started playing by the age of 14 At the age of 16 Peter-Paul moved to Canada. Peter-Paul represented Canada for the first time at the English Open in 1996 and has been with the national team for the past 12 years.

Peter-Paul can fluently speak Tamil, German, and English. He qualified to play table tennis in the 2008 Olympics for Canada.

Peter-Paul had a men's ITTF world ranking of 266th on 26 September 2011 with 1599 points.
