= Ko Lai Chak =

Hong Kong table tennis player

Personal information
- Nationality: Hong Kong
- Born: 10 May 1976 (age 50)

Sport
- Sport: Table tennis
- Playing style: Penhold Grip
Medal record
Representing Hong Kong
Men's table tennis
Olympic Games
Silver medal – second place	2004 Athens	Doubles
World Cup
Silver medal – second place	2007 Magdeburg	Team
Asian Games
Gold medal – first place	2006 Doha	Doubles
Bronze medal – third place	2006 Doha	Team

Ko Lai-chak (traditional Chinese: 高禮澤; simplified Chinese: 高礼泽; Jyutping: gou^{1} lai^{5} zaak^{6}; pinyin: Gāo Lǐzé; born 10 May 1976 in Chancheng, Foshan, Guangdong, China) is a table tennis player from Hong Kong.

He won a silver medal at the 2004 Summer Olympics in the men's doubles alongside Li Ching. At the 2006 Asian Games he won two medals, a gold in the men's doubles again alongside Li Ching; and a bronze in the men's singles tournament and the men's team competition. He uses a penhold grip. In the 2008 Summer Olympics, he made it to the quarter-finals.
