= Chen Weixing =

Austrian table tennis player

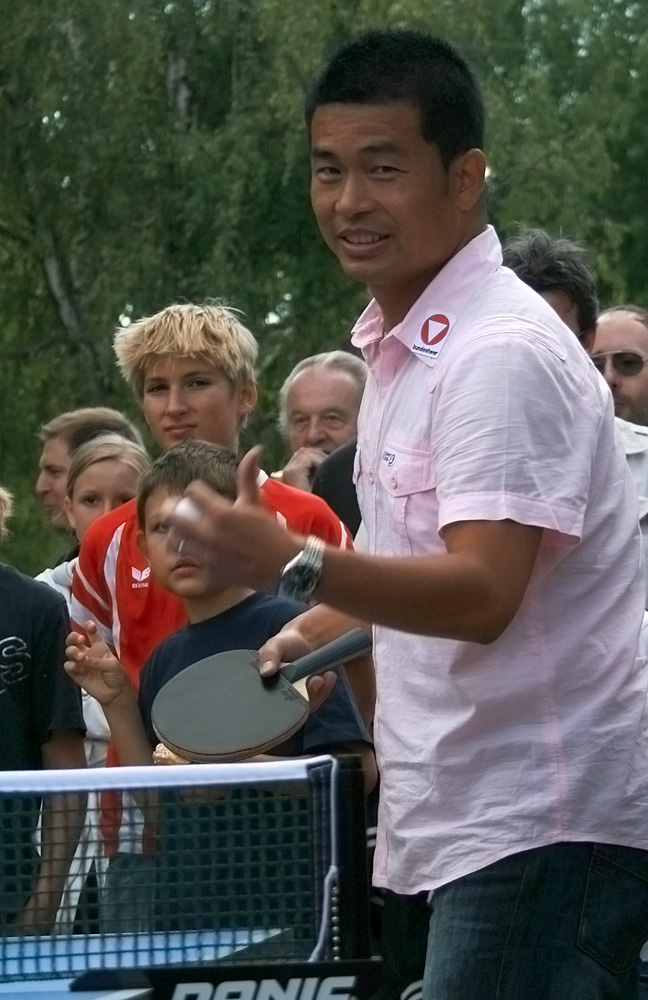

Personal information
- Full name: Chen Weixing
- Nationality: Austria
- Born: 27 April 1972 (age 54) Inner Mongolia, China

Sport
- Sport: Table tennis
- Playing style: Attacking Chopper
Medal record
Men's table tennis
Representing Austria
World Cup
| Bronze medal – third place | 2007 Magdeburg | Team |
| Bronze medal – third place | 2010 Dubai | Team |
European Championships
| Gold medal – first place | 2015 Yekaterinburg | Team |
| Gold medal – first place | 2003 Courmayeur | Doubles |
| Silver medal – second place | 2003 Courmayeur | Mixed Doubles |
| Silver medal – second place | 2005 Aarhus | Mixed Doubles |
| Silver medal – second place | 2005 Aarhus | Team |
| Bronze medal – third place | 2002 Zagreb | Mixed Doubles |

Chen Weixing (Chinese: 陈卫星; pinyin: Chén Wèixīng; born April 27, 1972, in Inner Mongolia, China) is an Austrian table tennis player of Chinese origin. He has played for SVS Lower Austria for several years.

Chen found it difficult to be selected in China's competitive national team. He made it to the top 15 but the opportunity to play at world class level was limited. Therefore, he decided to venture to Europe, first to Hungary, then Germany then Austria. Chen is considered to be one of the best defensive players in the world, reaching his personal best ranking of World number 9 in 2006.

Since the opening in 2011 Chen Weixing practices at the Werner Schlager Academy in Schwechat, Austria where he also works as a coach since 2015.

== Success ==
- Winner of the European Champions League: 2007/2008
- Double European Champion 2002
- Vice European Cup 2005
- ETTU-European Cup in 2000, won the TTG Hoengen

== See also ==
- List of table tennis players
