= William Henzell =

Australian table tennis player

William Henzell OLY
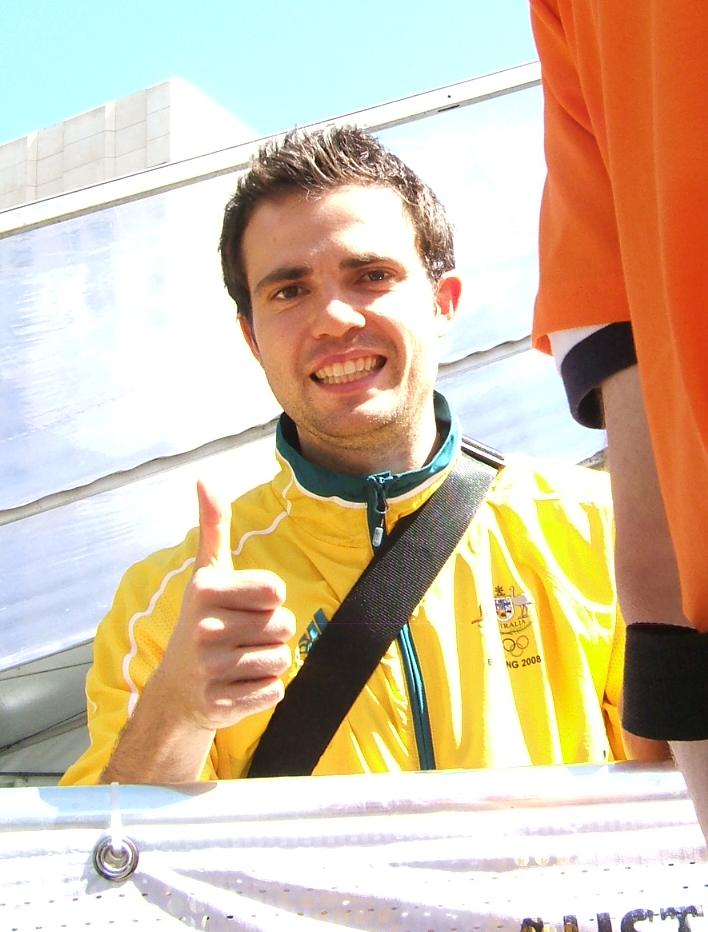
- Henzell in Beijing 2008

Sport
- Sport: Table tennis

William Henzell OLY (born 1982) is a right-handed Australian Table Tennis player generally regarded to be the greatest player Australia has produced. He was born in Adelaide and moved to Sweden at the age of 14. His highest international ranking was 90 in 2012. He has represented Australia many times, including securing Australia's first Commonwealth Games table tennis singles medal with a silver medal at the 2006 Commonwealth Games. William has represented Australia at 3 Olympic Games (2004, 2008, 2012) with a career best finish of 17th in 2012—Australia's highest singles placing ever. He was inducted into the Australia Table Tennis Hall of Fame at the age of 26, 20 years younger than any other of the inductees.

In 2010, William, in partnership with top Australian player Robert Frank, created the online table tennis coaching website ttedge.com.

== Career achievements ==
=== International ===
- Represented Australia
- 2004, 2008, 2012 Olympic Games
- 2002, 2006, 2010, 2014 Commonwealth Games
- 8 world championships

=== Achievements ===
- 2006 Commonwealth Games Men's Singles Silver Medal
- 13 times Australian National Champion – 2001, 02, 05, 06, 07, 08, 09, 10, 11, 12, 13, 14, 15
- 5 times Australian Open Champion – 2005, 07, 08, 09, 10
- 10 times Oceania Singles Champion – 2004, 2006, 2007, 2009, 2010, 2011, 2012, 2013, 2014, 2015

=== National ===
- Australian Champion (13 times) 2001, 2002, 2005, 2006, 2007, 2008, 2009, 2010, 2011, 2012, 2013, 2014, 2015
- Australia – Ranked no 1 (14 times) 2001–02, 04-15
- International – 99 – August 2014
