= Chiang Peng-lung =

Taiwanese table tennis player

Personal information
- Full name: Chiang Peng-Lung
- Nickname: 夜店王子，鬼之推擋
- Nationality: Republic of China
- Born: 24 July 1976 (age 50) Penghu, Taiwan
- Height: 1.85 m (6 ft 1 in)
- Weight: 85 kg (187 lb; 13.4 st)

Sport
- Sport: Table tennis
- Playing style: Right-handed, penhold grip
- Highest ranking: 3 (December 2000)
Medal record
Men's table tennis
Representing Chinese Taipei
World Championships
| Bronze medal – third place | 1997 Manchester | Mixed Doubles |
| Bronze medal – third place | 2001 Osaka | Singles |
| Bronze medal – third place | 2001 Osaka | Doubles |
| Bronze medal – third place | 2007 Zagreb | Doubles |

Chiang Peng-lung (Chinese: 蔣澎龍; pinyin: Jiǎng Pénglóng; born 24 July 1976, in Penghu) is a Taiwanese male professional table tennis player.

== Career highlights ==
Singles (as of August 15, 2010)

- Olympics: round of 16 (2000, 04).
- World Championships: SF (bronze) (2001).
- World Cup appearances: 6. Record: 4th (2001).
- Pro Tour winner (gold) (3): Czech Open 1999; French Open 2000; Japan Open 2001.
  Runner-up (silver) (4): Brazil Open 1999; Croatian, USA Open 2000; Croatian Open 2001.
- Pro Tour Grand Finals appearances: 4. Record: SF (bronze) (1999, 2000, 01).
- Asian Games: QF (1998, 2002, 06).
- Asian Championships: winner (gold) (2000).
- Asian Cup: 3rd (bronze) (2006).
- Asia Top-12: 2nd (silver) (1999)

Men's doubles

- Olympics: QF (2000).
- World Championships: SF (bronze) (2001, 07).
- Pro Tour winner (gold) (7): Qatar, German Open 1999; Croatian, French Open 2000; Qatar, USA Open 2001; Slovenian Open 2008.
  Runner-up (silver) (3): Australia, Czech Open 1999; Japan Open 2000.
- Pro Tour Grand Finals appearances: 2. Record: SF (bronze) (2000).
- Asian Games: SF (bronze) (1998, 2006).
- Asian Championships: winner (gold) (2000); SF (bronze) (1994).

Mixed doubles

- World Championships: SF (bronze) (1997).
- Asian Games: runner-up (silver) (1994).
- Asian Championships: QF (1996, 98).

Team

- Olympics: 7th (2008).
- World Championships: 6th (2008).
- Asian Championships: 2nd (silver) (2000, 03).
