= Alexey Smirnov (table tennis) =

Russian table tennis player

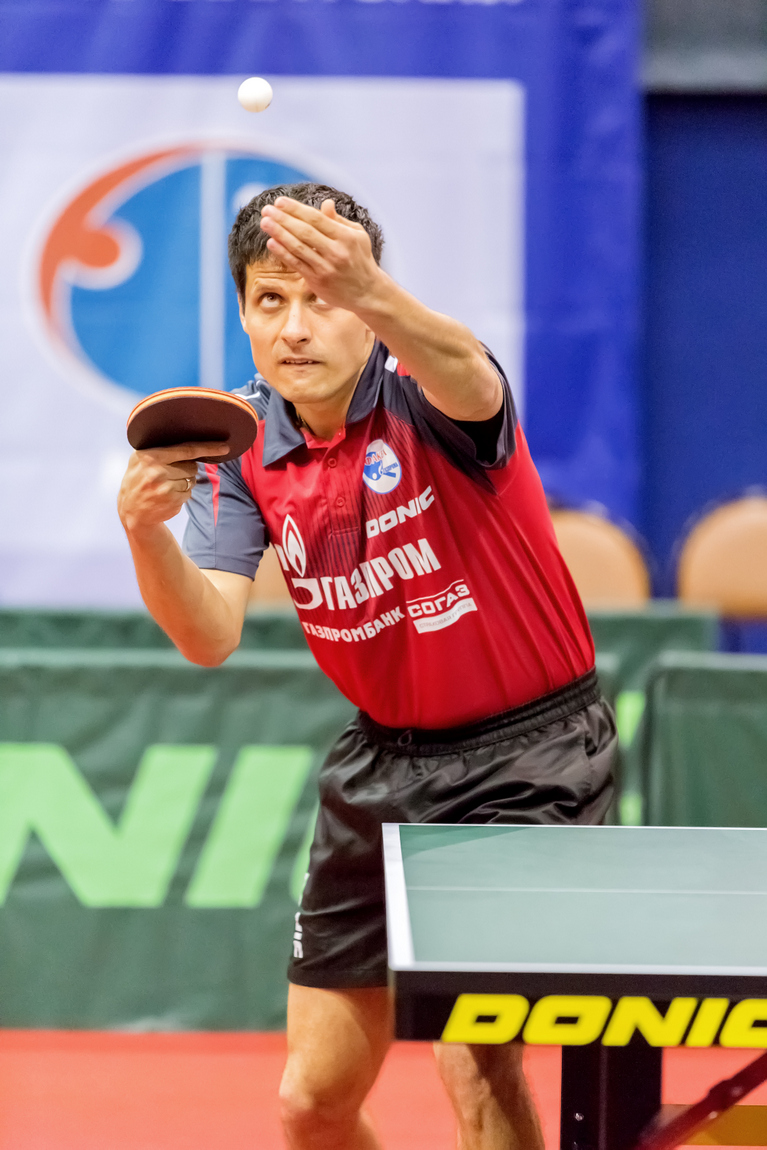

Personal information
- Full name: Alexey Smirnov
- Nationality: Russia
- Born: October 9, 1977 (age 48) Tolyatti, USSR
- Height: 1.79 m (5 ft 10 in)
- Weight: 69 kg (152 lb)

Sport
- Sport: Table tennis
Medal record
Men's table tennis
Representing Russia
European Championships
Silver medal – second place	2003 Courmayeur	Doubles
Bronze medal – third place	2005 Aarhus	Doubles
Bronze medal – third place	2005 Aarhus	Mixed Doubles
Bronze medal – third place	2007 Belgrade	Doubles
Bronze medal – third place	2007 Belgrade	Mixed Doubles

Alexey Smirnov (born October 9, 1977) is a male table tennis player from Russia. Since 2003 he won several medals in doubles events in the Table Tennis European Championships. He also won the gold medal at the Europe Top-12 in 2005 at Rennes.

He is also a multiple Russian national champion – four times in Men Singles and five in Men Doubles. He was also part of the winning cadet European Youth Championship team in 1992, as well as being the winner of the men's singles, the men's doubles and the mixed doubles at the junior level at the 1995 European Youth Championships. He also won the junior men's doubles at the 1994 European Youth Championships.

In May 2011 he qualified for the London 2012 Olympic Games via his world ranking for June 2011. He reached the last 32 where he was beaten by Jiang Tianyi. The Russian men's team lost to the eventual winners, China, in the first round.

== Career records ==
Singles (as of 4 October 2014)

- Olympics: round of 32 (2008, 2012).
- World Championships: round of 32 (2005, 2011, 2013)
- World Cup appearances: 4. Record: 5–8th (2003).
- Pro Tour Semi-Final: German Open 2002, Brazilian Open 2003, Croatian Open 2007
- Pro Tour Grand Finals appearances: 3. Record: round of 16 (2002, 2003, 2010).
- European Championships: QF (2003, 2005)
- Europe Top-12: Winner (2005).

Men's doubles

- Olympics – 4th (2004)
- World Championships: round of 16 (2003, 2005, 2007)
- Pro Tour winner (1): Slovenian Open 2010.
- European Championships: Runner-up (2003)

Mixed doubles

- World Championships: round of 64 (1999, 2003, 2005, 2007).
- European Championships: QF (2005, 2007)F (2007).

Team

- Olympics: 9th (2012).
- World Championships: 6th (2006, 2010).
- World Team Cup: 7th (2007)
- World Cup: 5th (2011)

== See also ==
- List of table tennis players
