= Leung Chu Yan =

Hong Kong table tennis player

Personal information
- Nationality: Hong Kong
- Born: 21 April 1979 (age 47) Foshan, Guangdong, China

Sport
- Sport: Table tennis

Leung Chu Yan (Chinese: 梁柱恩; Jyutping: loeng^{4} cyu^{5} jan^{1}; born 1979) is a table tennis player from Hong Kong. He competed at the 2000, 2004 and 2012 Summer Olympics.
