= Li Ching (table tennis) =

Hong Kong table tennis player

Personal information
- Full name: Li Ching
- Nationality: Hong Kong
- Born: 7 March 1975 (age 51) Doumen, Zhuhai, Guangdong, China
- Height: 1.66 m (5 ft 5 in)
- Weight: 54 kg (119 lb)

Sport
- Sport: Table tennis
- Playing style: Penhold Grip
- Highest ranking: 10
Medal record
Men's table tennis
Representing Hong Kong
Olympic Games
Silver medal – second place	2004 Athens	Doubles
World Championships
Bronze medal – third place	2006 Bremen	Team
Bronze medal – third place	2007 Zagreb	Doubles
Bronze medal – third place	2008 Guangzhou	Team
World Cup
Silver medal – second place	2007 Magdeburg	Team
Asian Games
Gold medal – first place	2006 Doha	Doubles
Bronze medal – third place	2002 Busan	Team
Bronze medal – third place	2006 Doha	Singles
Bronze medal – third place	2006 Doha	Team

Li Ching (traditional Chinese: 李靜; simplified Chinese: 李静; Jyutping: lei^{5} zing^{6}; born 7 March 1975 in Doumen, Guangdong, China) is a table tennis player from Hong Kong. He is best known for the joint silver medal he won for Hong Kong at the Athens Olympic in 2004.

== Career ==
Born in Guangdong, Li joined the Chinese national table tennis team in 1990, and won second place at the men's single table tennis competition at the National Cup in China.

Li's performance during his time at the Chinese national team fluctuated wildly, due primarily to switching of tactics. In 1994, Li withdrew from the Chinese national team for health reasons, and moved to Hong Kong to join its national table tennis team.

During Li's time on the Hong Kong team, he paired up with Ko Lai Chak as a duo, and achieved legendary status after the duo's silver medal win in Athens. In 2006, the duo won a pair of gold medals in their category at the Asian Games held in Doha. Li himself did not do as well in the solo table tennis discipline, being defeated by fellow Chinese athletes during the semi-final stages.

Li is now a table tennis coach and led the Hong Kong women's team to a bronze at the 2020 Summer Olympics.
