= Seiya Kishikawa =

Japanese table tennis player

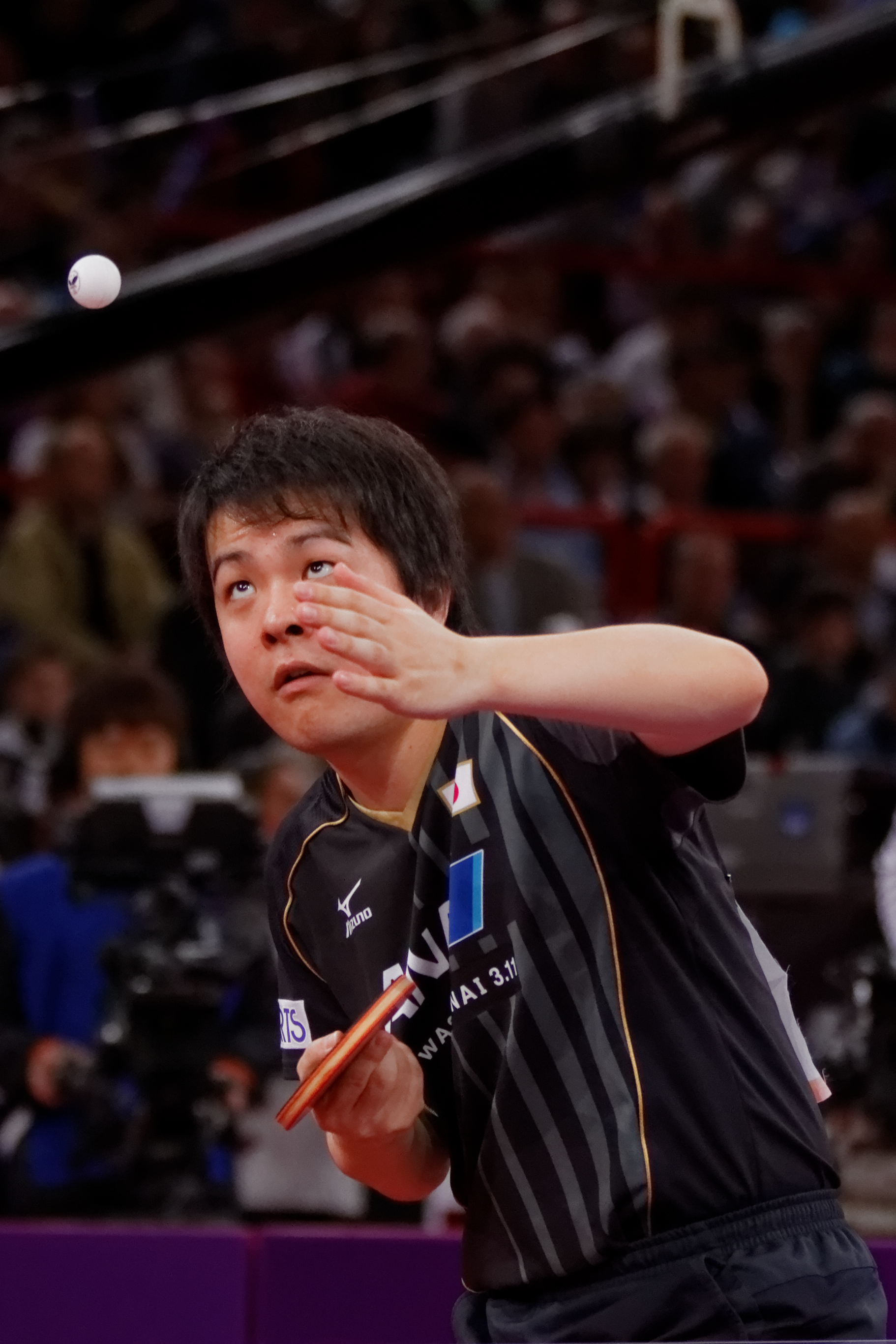
- Seiya Kishikawa in 2013

Personal information
- Nationality: Japan
- Born: 21 May 1987 (age 39) Fukuoka, Japan
- Height: 1.68 m (5 ft 6 in)
- Weight: 68 kg (150 lb; 10.7 st)

Sport
- Sport: Table tennis
- Playing style: Right-handed, shakehand grip
- Highest ranking: 16 (December 2011)
Medal record
Men's table tennis
Representing Japan
World Championships
Bronze medal – third place	2008 Guangzhou	Team
Bronze medal – third place	2009 Yokohama	Doubles
Bronze medal – third place	2010 Moscow	Team
Bronze medal – third place	2011 Rotterdam	Mixed Doubles
Bronze medal – third place	2012 Dortmund	Team
Bronze medal – third place	2013 Paris	Doubles
Bronze medal – third place	2014 Tokyo	Team
Asian Championships
Silver medal – second place	2007 Yangzhou	Team
Silver medal – second place	2009 Lucknow	Team
Bronze medal – third place	2007 Yangzhou	Doubles
Bronze medal – third place	2009 Lucknow	Mixed Doubles

Seiya Kishikawa (岸川聖也, Kishikawa Seiya; born 21 May 1987) is a male Japanese table tennis player. He paired with Jun Mizutani in men's doubles competitions, the duo won four consecutive national titles from 2007 to 2010. They also won a bronze medal at the 2009 World Championships and two titles at the ITTF Pro Tour. He currently plays for the German team TTC Ruhrstadt Herne.
