= Basketball at the 1996 Summer Olympics – Women's team rosters =

Olympic basketball rosters

Twelve women's teams competed in basketball at the 1996 Summer Olympics.

== Australia ==
The following players represented Australia:

- Carla Boyd
- Michelle Brogan-Griffiths
- Sandy Brondello
- Michelle Chandler
- Allison Cook-Tranquilli
- Trisha Fallon
- Robyn Maher
- Fiona Robinson-Hannan
- Shelley Gorman-Sandie
- Rachael Sporn
- Michele Timms
- Jenny Whittle

== Brazil ==
The following players represented Brazil:

- Hortência
- Paula
- Janeth
- Marta Sobral
- Alessandra
- Branca
- Adriana
- Leila
- Roseli
- Silvinha
- Cíntia
- Cláudia

== Canada ==
The following players represented Canada:

- Bev Smith
- Karla Karch-Gailus
- Camille Thompson
- Sue Stewart
- Shawna Molcak
- Jodi Evans
- Cynthia Johnston
- Dianne Norman
- Martina Jerant
- Kelly Boucher
- Andrea Blackwell
- Marlelynn Lange-Harris

== China ==
The following players represented China:

- Zheng Dongmei
- Liang Xin
- Zheng Haixia
- He Jun
- Ma Zongqing
- Miao Bo
- Li Xin
- Liu Jun
- Shen Li
- Chu Hui
- Li Dongmei
- Ma Chengqing

== Cuba ==
The following players represented Cuba:

- Tania Seino
- María León
- Yamilé Martínez
- Dalia Henry
- Milayda Enríquez
- Lisdeivis Víctores
- Olga Vigil
- Grisel Herrera
- Biosotis Lagnó
- Judith Águila
- Cariola Hechavarría
- Gertrudis Gómez

== Italy ==
The following players represented Italy:

- Susanna Bonfiglio
- Mara Fullin
- Nicoletta Caselin
- Catarina Pollini
- Giuseppina Tufano
- Stefania Zanussi
- Elena Paparazzo
- Valentina Gardellin
- Viviana Ballabio
- Marta Rezoagli
- Lorenza Arnetoli
- Novella Schiesaro

== Japan ==
The following players represented Japan:

- Aki Ichijo
- Chikako Murakami
- Taeko Oyama
- Mikiko Hagiwara
- Kikuko Mikawa
- Kagari Yamada
- Takako Kato
- Yuka Harada
- Akemi Okazato
- Mayumi Kawasaki
- Mutsuko Nagata
- Noriko Hamaguchi

== Russia ==
The following players represented Russia:

- Lyudmila Konovalova
- Yevgeniya Nikonova
- Irina Rutkovskaya
- Maria Stepanova
- Elena Baranova
- Nataliya Svinukhova
- Svetlana Kuznetsova
- Irina Sumnikova
- Elen Bunatyants-Shakirova
- Yelena Pshikova
- Svetlana Zaboluyeva-Antipova

== South Korea ==
The following players represented South Korea:

- Kim Ji-yun
- Jeon Ju-won
- Gwon Eun-jeong
- Han Hyeon-seon
- Yu Yeong-ju
- Park Jeong-eun
- Kim Jeong-min
- An Seon-mi
- Cheon Eun-suk
- Lee Jong-ae
- Jeong Seon-min
- Jeong Eun-sun

== Ukraine ==
The following players represented Ukraine:

- Ruslana Kyrychenko
- Viktoriya Burenok
- Olena Zhyrko
- Maryna Tkachenko
- Liudmyla Nazarenko
- Olena Oberemko
- Viktoriya Paradiz
- Viktoriya Leleka
- Oksana Dovhaliuk
- Diana Sadovnykova
- Nataliya Silianova
- Olha Shliakhova

== United States ==
The following players represented the United States:

- Teresa Edwards
- Ruthie Bolton-Holifield
- Sheryl Swoopes
- Lisa Leslie
- Katrina McClain
- Dawn Staley
- Jennifer Azzi
- Carla McGhee
- Katy Steding
- Rebecca Lobo
- Venus Lacy
- Nikki McCray

== Zaire ==
The following players represented Zaire:

- Mwadi Mabika
- Lukengu Ngalula
- Kasala Kamanga
- Muene Tshijuka
- Mukendi Mbuyi
- Kakengwa Pikinini
- Zaina Kapepula
- Patricia N'Goy Benga
- Kongolo Amba
- Lileko Bonzali
- Kaninga Mbambi
- Natalie Lobela
