= List of flag bearers for the Democratic Republic of the Congo at the Olympics =

Democratic Republic of the Congo at the Olympics
- Flag of the Democratic Republic of the Congo
- IOC code: COD
- NOC: Comité Olympique Congolais
- Medals: Gold 0 Silver 0 Bronze 0 Total 0

Summer appearances
- 1968; 1972–1980; 1984; 1988; 1992; 1996; 2000; 2004; 2008; 2012; 2016; 2020; 2024

This is a list of flag bearers who have represented the Democratic Republic of the Congo at the Olympics.

Flag bearers carry the national flag of their country at the opening ceremony of the Olympic Games.

#	Event year	Season	Flag bearer	Sport	Ref.
1	1968	Summer			
2	1984	Summer	Christine Bakombo	Athletics	
3	1988	Summer	Dikanda Diba	Athletics	
4	1992	Summer			
5	1996	Summer	Lukengu Ngalula	Basketball	
6	2000	Summer			
7	2004	Summer	Gary Kikaya	Athletics	
8	2008	Summer	Franka Magali	Athletics	
9	2012	Summer	Ilunga Mande Zatara	Athletics	
10	2016	Summer	Rosa Keleku	Taekwondo	
11	2020	Summer	Marcelat Sakobi Matshu	Boxing	
11	2020	Summer	David Tshama	Boxing	
12	2024	Summer	Brigitte Mbabi	Boxing	
12	2024	Summer	Dominique Lasconi Mulamba	Athletics	

== See also ==
- Democratic Republic of the Congo at the Olympics
