= 1994 FIBA World Championship for Women squads =

The 1994 FIBA World Championship for Women was held in Australia. The list includes the twelve-women rosters of the sixteen participating countries, totaling 172 players.

== Group A ==
=== Spain ===
Spain roster
Players
Coaches

Pos.	No.	Name	Age – Date of birth	Height	Club
	4	Laura Grande Flores	? – 23 January 1973
	5	Carolina Mújica	? – 14 September 1964
	6	Blanca Ares Torres	? – 30 December 1970
	7	Maria Del Mar Xantal Serret	? – 8 November 1973
	8	María Pilar Alonso López	? – 8 October 1968
	9	Myriam Ligia Henningsen Perez	? – 3 July 1966
	10	Pilar Valero Cebrian	? – 27 May 1970
	11	Ana Belen Alvaro Bascuñana	? – 22 April 1969
	12	Maria d.l.Nieves Lobon Herrero	? – 13 March 1970
F	13	Marina Ferragut Castillo	? – 11 February 1972	6 ft 3 in (1.91 m)
C	14	Elisabeth Cebrian Scheurer	? – 7 February 1971	6 ft 5 in (1.96 m)
	15	Paloma Sanchez Ortega	? – 5 March 1967

=== New Zealand ===
New Zealand roster
Players
Coaches

Pos.	No.	Name	Age – Date of birth	Height	Club
G	4	Leanne Frances Walker	? – 17 July 1968	5 ft 5 in (1.65 m)
	5	Tracey Jane Garland	? – 10 November 1970
G	6	Antonia Noela Solomon	? – 15 March 1969	5 ft 6 in (1.68 m)
G	7	Kirstin Marie Daly	? – 17 May 1969	5 ft 6 in (1.68 m)
	8	Maria Francis Noon	? – 5 April 1967
	9	Jane Catherine Lattimore	? – 22 June 1968
	10	Corrina Gwendalyn Cordzt	? – 6 February 1962
	11	Vicki Gillian Cunningham	? – 30 January 1961
F	12	Leone Dorothy Patterson	? – 11 December 1962	6 ft 1 in (1.85 m)
G	13	Tania Maria Tupu	? – 28 December 1973	5 ft 11 in (1.8 m)
	14	Sonja Akkerman	? – 25 October 1965
C	15	Gina Marie Farmer	? – 12 December 1974	6 ft 2 in (1.88 m)

=== South Korea ===
South Korea roster
Players
Coaches

Pos.	No.	Name	Age – Date of birth	Height	Club
	4	Youn Young-mi	? – 28 January 1968
	5	Han Hyun-sun	? – 24 July 1973
	6	Lee Kang-hee	? – 18 May 1969
	7	Lee Yu-jin	? – 27 October 1971
	8	Yoo Young-joo	? – 23 November 1971
	9	Park Hyun-sook	? – 28 December 1969
	10	Shon Kyung-won	? – 17 May 1969
	11	Kwun Eun-jeong	? – 18 August 1974
	12	Han Hyun	? – 30 September 1971
C	13	Jung Sun-min	? – 12 October 1974	6 ft 1 in (1.85 m)
C	14	Chung Eun-soon	? – 18 July 1971	6 ft 1 in (1.85 m)
	15	Kang Seon-koo	? – 22 January 1969

=== United States ===
United States roster
Players
Coaches

Pos.	No.	Name	Age – Date of birth	Height	Club
G	4	Teresa Edwards	? – 19 July 1964	5 ft 9 in (1.75 m)
G	5	Dawn Michelle Staley	? – 4 May 1970	5 ft 5 in (1.65 m)
G	6	Alice Ruth Bolton	? – 25 May 1967	5 ft 8 in (1.73 m)
F	7	Sheryl Denise Swoopes	? – 25 March 1971	6 ft 0 in (1.83 m)
	8	Jennifer Azzi	? – 31 August 1968
C	9	Lisa Leslie	? – 7 July 1972	6 ft 5 in (1.96 m)
	10	Carla Renee Mcghee	? – 6 March 1968
	11	Andrea Lane Lloyd-Coletti	? – 2 September 1965
	12	Katrina Felicia Mcclain	? – 19 September 1965
C	13	Kara Elizabeth Wolters	? – 15 August 1975	6 ft 7 in (2.01 m)
	14	Dena Nicole Head	? – 16 August 1970
	15	Daedra Janel Charles	? – 22 November 1968

== Group B ==
=== Canada ===
Canada roster
Players
Coaches

Pos.	No.	Name	Age – Date of birth	Height	Club
	4	Tara Gallaway	? – 28 December 1970
G	5	Karla Rae Karch	? – 26 August 1964	5 ft 8 in (1.73 m)
	6	Beverly Ann Smith	? – 4 April 1960
	7	Susan Laurrine Stewart	? – 14 November 1969
	8	Shawna Marie Molcak	? – 28 October 1968
	9	Jodi Karyn Evans	? – 16 August 1968
	10	Cynthia Mary Johnston	? – 11 October 1968
	11	Denise Scott	? – 13 March 1969
	12	Camille Marie Thompson	? – 13 August 1971
F	13	Kelly Anne Boucher	? – 13 January 1968	6 ft 2 in (1.88 m)
	14	Andrea Jill Blackwell	? – 23 November 1962
	15	Merlelynn Sabine Lange-Harris	? – 28 April 1969

=== Cuba ===
Cuba roster
Players
Coaches

Pos.	No.	Name	Age – Date of birth	Height	Club
F	4	Tania Seino Barbón	? – 9 July 1973	6 ft 0 in (1.83 m)
C	5	Yamile Martinez Calderón	? – 11 October 1970	6 ft 5 in (1.96 m)
	6	Biosotys Lagnó Feometa	? – 16 November 1969
	7	Olga Lídia Vigil Gómez	? – 26 August 1970
G	8	Dalia Henry Hernandez	? – 14 June 1965	5 ft 11 in (1.8 m)
	9	Andrea Leonora Borrell Hernández	? – 10 November 1963
	11	Regla C. Hernández Buides	? – 27 April 1968
G	12	Licet Castillo Iglesias	? – 25 January 1973	5 ft 9 in (1.75 m)
G	13	María Elena León Molinet	? – 7 April 1967	5 ft 11 in (1.8 m)
C	14	Milayda Enríquez	? – 7 November 1969	6 ft 3 in (1.91 m)
C	15	Judith Aguila Hernández	? – 6 October 1972	6 ft 4 in (1.93 m)
C	15	Lisdeivi Victores Pompa	? – 2 July 1974	6 ft 4 in (1.93 m)

=== France ===
France roster
Players
Coaches

Pos.	No.	Name	Age – Date of birth	Height	Club
	4	Amy Cissé	? – 28 August 1969
	5	Corinne Esquirol	? – 22 December 1971
C	6	Isabelle Fijalkowski	? – 23 May 1972	6 ft 5 in (1.96 m)
	8	Katia Foucade	? – 9 May 1971
C	8	Laétitia Moussard	? – 2 July 1971	6 ft 3 in (1.91 m)
	9	Christine Gomis	? – 3 February 1968
F	10	Catherine Melain	? – 19 May 1974	6 ft 1 in (1.85 m)
	11	Odile Nathalie Santaniello	? – 21 December 1966
	12	Halima Soussi	? – 29 August 1965
G	13	Yannick Souvré	? – 19 September 1969	5 ft 9 in (1.75 m)
C	14	Stéphanie Vivenot	? – 26 March 1970	6 ft 4 in (1.93 m)
	15	Carole Force	? – 9 December 1968

=== Kenya ===
Kenya roster
Players
Coaches

Pos.	No.	Name	Age – Date of birth	Height	Club
	4	Caroline Omamo	? – 29 November 1968
	7	Queen Olumbo	? – 22 April 1964
	8	Jane Makale	? – 26 May 1966
	8	Safia Mohammed	? – 26 July 1962
	9	Petronila Muthoni	? – 27 March 1968
	10	Caterine Shava	? – 30 June 1965
	11	Nasila Onjiko	? – 22 December 1969
	12	Celestine Imbaya	? – 11 November 1969
	13	Bether Achieng Akuno	? – 10 May 1963
	14	Susan Kariuki	? – 22 December 1966
	14	Alice Onono	? – 3 September 1966
	15	Miriam Owiti	? – 5 April 1972

== Group C ==
=== Brazil ===
Brazil roster
Players
Coaches

Pos.	No.	Name	Age – Date of birth	Height	Club
	4	Hortência Marcari	? – 24 September 1959
F	5	Helen Luz	? – 23 November 1972	5 ft 9 in (1.75 m)
F	6	Adriana Santos	? – 18 January 1971	5 ft 11 in (1.8 m)
	7	Leila Sobral	? – 22 November 1974
	8	Maria Paula Silva	? – 11 March 1962
F	9	Janeth Arcain	? – 11 April 1969	6 ft 0 in (1.83 m)
	10	Roseli Gustavo	? – 25 July 1971
	11	Simone Pontello	? – 8 September 1971
	12	Ruth Roberta de Souza	? – 3 October 1968
C	13	Alessandra Santos de Oliveira	? – 2 December 1973	6 ft 7 in (2.01 m)
C	14	Cíntia Santos	? – 31 January 1975	6 ft 4 in (1.93 m)
	15	Dalila Mello	? – 17 May 1970

Head coach

Miguel Ângelo da Luz

=== Chinese Taipei ===
Chinese Taipei roster
Players
Coaches

Pos.	No.	Name	Age – Date of birth	Height	Club
	4	Chen Shu-chung	? – 8 December 1970
	5	Weng Hsiao-mei	? – 28 January 1974
	6	Chung I-chuan	? – 21 September 1973
C	7	Cheng Hui-yun	? – 23 April 1977	6 ft 1 in (1.85 m)
	8	Chen Shu-jen	? – 10 January 1968
	9	Chan Li-yun	? – 24 February 1973
	10	Chien Wei-chuan	? – 8 March 1971	5 ft 7 in (1.7 m)
	11	Chi Lin	? – 15 December 1968
	12	Li Pi-hsia	? – 18 February 1966
	13	Teng Pi-cheng	? – 15 December 1964
	14	Huang Kuan-ya	? – 1 December 1969
	15	Huang Ya-chen	? – 18 January 1969

=== Poland ===
Poland roster
Players
Coaches

Pos.	No.	Name	Age – Date of birth	Height	Club
	4	Marzena Fraszczak	? – 2 February 1966
	5	Marzena Glaszcz	? – 4 March 1970
G	6	Sylwia Wlaźlak	? – 24 March 1973	5 ft 7 in (1.7 m)
G	7	Beata Krupska-Tyszkiewicz	? – 23 January 1970	5 ft 5 in (1.65 m)
	8	Agnieszka Jaroszewicz	? – 19 August 1971
C	10	Elzbieta Maria Trzesniewska	? – 2 September 1972	6 ft 3 in (1.91 m)
	11	Dorota Pozniak	? – 8 March 1969
	11	Alina Slabecka	? – 31 January 1974
C	12	Malgorzata Dydek	? – 28 April 1974	7 ft 0 in (2.13 m)
	14	Malgorzata Czerlonko	? – 11 December 1963
	14	Anita Olecka (Wojtczak)	? – 23 February 1967
	15	Ewa Malgorzata Portianko	? – 7 April 1967

=== Slovakia ===
Slovakia roster
Players
Coaches

Pos.	No.	Name	Age – Date of birth	Height	Club
	4	Milena Rázgová	? – 2 November 1969
G	5	Sona Hudecová	? – 13 September 1969	5 ft 7 in (1.7 m)
C	6	Anna Kotocová	? – 6 April 1968	6 ft 2 in (1.88 m)
F	7	Martina Godályová	? – 15 May 1975	6 ft 1 in (1.85 m)
	8	Iveta Farkasova	? – 8 November 1971
F	9	Dagmar Hutková	? – 20 December 1971	5 ft 11 in (1.8 m)
C	10	Renáta Hiráková	? – 27 May 1971	6 ft 3 in (1.91 m)
	11	Kamila Pavláková	? – 15 May 1974
	12	Erika Dobrovicová	? – 10 September 1967
	13	Andrea Slosiarová	? – 28 June 1972
	14	Adriana Chamajová	? – 1 February 1971
G	15	Andrea Kuklova	? – 16 July 1971	5 ft 11 in (1.8 m)

== Group D ==
=== Australia ===
Australia roster
Players
Coaches

Pos.	No.	Name	Age – Date of birth	Height	Club
	4	Robyn Maher	? – 6 October 1959
G	5	Annie La Fleur	? – 3 November 1969	5 ft 6 in (1.68 m)
G	6	Sandy Brondello	? – 20 August 1968	5 ft 7 in (1.7 m)
G	7	Michelle Timms	? – 28 June 1965	5 ft 5 in (1.65 m)
G	8	Shelley Sandie	? – 22 January 1969	5 ft 11 in (1.8 m)
F	9	Trisha Fallon	? – 23 July 1972	6 ft 3 in (1.91 m)
G	10	Allison Tranquilli	? – 12 August 1972	5 ft 10 in (1.78 m)
	11	Samantha Thornton	? – 20 April 1966
	12	Karen Dalton	? – 2 January 1961
C	13	Jenny Whittle	? – 5 September 1973	6 ft 6 in (1.98 m)
F	14	Rachael Sporn	? – 26 May 1968	6 ft 2 in (1.88 m)
F	15	Michelle Brogan	? – 8 February 1973	6 ft 1 in (1.85 m)

=== China ===
China roster
Players
Coaches

Pos.	No.	Name	Age – Date of birth	Height	Club
	4	Zhang Weijuan	? – 2 January 1971
	5	Li Xin	? – 5 November 1969
	6	Liu Jun	? – 15 October 1969
	7	Wang Fang	? – 14 January 1967
	8	Zheng Dongmei	? – 23 December 1967
	9	He Jun	? – 3 March 1969
	10	Liang Xin	? – 7 March 1975
	11	Zheng Haixia	? – 7 March 1967
	12	Zheng Wei	? – 5 September 1963
	13	Li Dongmei	? – 6 November 1969
	14	Ma Zongqing	? – 22 July 1975
	15	Sun Ying	? – 18 June 1967

=== Italy ===
Italy roster
Players
Coaches

Pos.	No.	Name	Age – Date of birth	Height	Club
C	4	Elena Paparazzo	? – 11 May 1973	6 ft 4 in (1.93 m)
G	5	Susanna Bonfiglio	? – 8 September 1974	5 ft 10 in (1.78 m)
	6	Nicoletta Caselin	? – 7 April 1973
	7	Elisabetta Cesarini	? – 25 May 1966
G	8	Viviana Ballabio	? – 26 July 1967	5 ft 9 in (1.75 m)
	9	Francesca Rossi	? – 2 June 1968
	10	Angela Arcangeli	? – 12 April 1971
	11	Catarina Pollini	? – 16 March 1966
	12	Silvia Todeschini	? – 2 December 1967
	13	Giuseppina Tufano	? – 19 June 1965
C	14	Renata Salvestrini	? – 25 July 1969	6 ft 6 in (1.98 m)
	15	Stefania Zanussi	? – 6 November 1965

=== Japan ===
Japan roster
Players
Coaches

Pos.	No.	Name	Age – Date of birth	Height	Club
	4	Yuka Harada	? – 5 June 1968
	5	Kikuko Mikawa	? – 29 April 1968
	6	Hiroe Kakizaki	? – 12 April 1969
	7	Aki Ichijo	? – 13 November 1969
	8	Chikako Murakami	? – 10 October 1970
	9	Mikiko Hagiwara	? – 17 April 1970
	10	Takako Katō	? – 12 April 1971
	11	Takami Takeuchi	? – 17 August 1971
C	13	Noriko Koiso	? – 15 January 1974	6 ft 0 in (1.83 m)
G	14	Taeko Oyama	? – 18 June 1974	5 ft 8 in (1.73 m)
G	15	Akemi Okazato	? – 24 July 1974	5 ft 11 in (1.8 m)
	15	Kagari Yamada	? – 4 June 1972
