= Zaire at the 1996 Summer Olympics =

- Flag of Zaire
- IOC code: ZAI
- NOC: Comité National Olympique Zaïrois

in Atlanta
- Competitors: 14 in 2 sports
- Flag bearer: Lukengu Ngalula
- Medals: Gold 0 Silver 0 Bronze 0 Total 0

Summer Olympics appearances (overview)
- 1968; 1972–1980; 1984; 1988; 1992; 1996; 2000; 2004; 2008; 2012; 2016; 2020; 2024

Zaire competed at the 1996 Summer Olympics in Atlanta, United States. The 1996 games marked the country's last appearance under the name Zaire; the following year, president Mobutu Sese Seko was deposed in the First Congo War and the nation reverted to its previous name, the Democratic Republic of the Congo.

== Competitors ==
The following is the list of number of competitors in the Games.

Sport	Men	Women	Total
Athletics	2	0	2
Basketball	0	12	12
Total	2	12	14

== Results by event ==
=== Athletics ===
==== Men ====
Track and road events

Athletes	Events	Heat Round 1		Heat Round 2		Semifinal		Final	
Athletes	Events	Time	Rank	Time	Rank	Time	Rank	Time	Rank
Willy Kalombo	Marathon	N/A						2:17:01	16
Kaleka Mutoke	Marathon	N/A						2:34:40	96

=== Basketball ===
==== Women's tournament ====
Roster

- Mwadi Mabika
- Lukengu Ngalula
- Kasala Kamanga
- Muene Tshijuka
- Mukendi Mbuyi
- Kakengwa Pikinini
- Zaina Kapepula
- Patricia N'Goy Benga
- Kongolo Amba
- Lileko Bonzali
- Kaninga Mbambi
- Natalie Lobela

Preliminary round - Group B

Pos	Team	Pld	W	L	PF	PA	PD	Pts	Qualification
1	United States (H)	5	5	0	507	339	+168	10	Quarterfinals
2	Ukraine	5	3	2	354	358	−4	8 (Note: Head-to-head record: Ukraine 1–0 Australia)	Quarterfinals
3	Australia	5	3	2	369	319	+50	8	Quarterfinals
4	Cuba	5	2	3	365	377	−12	7 (Note: Head-to-head record: Cuba 1–0 South Korea)	Quarterfinals
5	South Korea	5	2	3	347	389	−42	7	
6	Zaire	5	0	5	287	447	−160	5	

Source: FIBA archive
Rules for classification: 1) points; 2) head-to-head points; 3) head-to-head goal average; 4) head-to-head number of points scored.
(H) Hosts
Notes:

21 July 1996

Boxscore

Zaire	65–81	Ukraine
Pts: Mabika 14; Rebs: Ngalula, Tshijuka 7 Asts: Kamanga 4		Pts: Tkachenko 27; Rebs: Nazareko 9 Asts: Tkachenko, Zhyrko 5

Morehouse College Gymnasium, Atlanta

23 July 1996

Boxscore

Australia	91–45	Zaire
Pts: Sandie 18; Rebs: Sandie 8 Asts: Timms, Fallon 4		Pts: Tshijuka 15; Rebs: Tshijuka 10; Asts: Kamanga 5

Morehouse College Gymnasium, Atlanta

25 July 1996

Boxscore

United States	107–47	Zaire
Pts: Azzi 18; Rebs: McCray 8 Asts: Edwards 5		Pts: Ngalula 17; Rebs: Tshijuka, Lobela 5 Asts: Mabika 3

Morehouse College Gymnasium, Atlanta

27 July 1996

Boxscore

Zaire	71–95	South Korea
Pts: Mabika 30; Rebs: Tshijuka, Ngalula 7 Asts: Ngalula 3		Pts: Chun E-s 29; Rebs: Chun J-w 6 Asts: Chun E-s 14

Morehouse College Gymnasium, Atlanta

29 July 1996

Boxscore

Cuba	73–59	Zaire
Pts: León 20; Rebs: Martínez 12; Asts: Henry 7		Pts: Mabika 27; Rebs: Ngalula 9 Asts: three players 3

Morehouse College Gymnasium, Atlanta

Classification round 9th–12th

31 July 1996
10:00

Boxscore

Zaire	67–91	China
Scoring by half: 36–47, 31–44
Pts: Mabika 30; Rebs: Lobela 9 Asts: Ngalula 3		Pts: Zheng H 26; Rebs: Zheng H 10; Asts: Ma Z 6

Georgia Dome, Atlanta

11th-place match

3 August 1996
10:00

Boxscore

Zaire	46–88	Canada
Scoring by half: 20–52, 26–36
Pts: Ngalula 12; Rebs: Tshijuka 9 Asts: Ngalula, Pikinini 2		Pts: Smith 21; Rebs: Norman 10; Asts: Karch-Gailus 6

Georgia Dome, Atlanta
