= Democratic Republic of the Congo at the 2004 Summer Olympics =

- Flag of the Democratic Republic of the Congo
- IOC code: COD
- NOC: Congolese Olympic Committee

in Athens
- Competitors: 4 in 2 sports
- Flag bearer: Gary Kikaya
- Medals: Gold 0 Silver 0 Bronze 0 Total 0

Summer Olympics appearances (overview)
- 1968; 1972–1980; 1984; 1988; 1992; 1996; 2000; 2004; 2008; 2012; 2016; 2020; 2024

The Democratic Republic of the Congo was represented at the 2004 Summer Olympics in Athens, Greece by the Congolese Olympic Committee.

In total, four athletes including three men and one woman represented the Democratic Republic of the Congo in two different sports including athletics and table tennis.

== Competitors ==
In total, four athletes represented the Democratic Republic of the Congo at the 2004 Summer Olympics in Athens, Greece across two different sports.

| Sport | Men | Women | Total |
|---|---|---|---|
| Athletics | 1 | 1 | 2 |
| Table tennis | 2 | 0 | 2 |
| Total | 3 | 1 | 4 |

== Athletics ==
In total, two Congolese athletes participated in the athletics events – Noelly Mankatu Bibiche in the women's 800 m and Gary Kikaya in the men's 400 m.

The heats for the men's 400 m took place on 20 August 2004. Kikaya finished fourth in his heat in a time of 45.57 seconds and he advanced to the semi-finals as one of the fastest losers. His fourth place was later upgraded to third after Anton Galkin of Russia was disqualified for doping. The semi-finals took place the following day. Kikaya finished sixth in his semi-final in a time of 45.58 seconds and he did not advance to the final.

| Athlete | Event | Heat | | Semifinal | | Final | |
| Athlete | Event | Result | Rank | Result | Rank | Result | Rank |
|---|---|---|---|---|---|---|---|
| Gary Kikaya | 400 m | 45.57 | 4 q | 45.58 | 6 | did not advance | |

The heats for the women's 800 m took place on 20 August 2004. Bibiche finished sixth in her heat in a time of two minutes 6.23 seconds and she did not advance to the semi-finals.

| Athlete | Event | Heat | | Semifinal | | Final | |
| Athlete | Event | Result | Rank | Result | Rank | Result | Rank |
|---|---|---|---|---|---|---|---|
| Noelly Mankatu Bibiche | 800 m | 2:06.23 | 6 | did not advance | | | |

== Table tennis ==
In total, two Congolese athletes participated in the table events – Momo Babungu and Jose Luyindula in the men's singles and the men's doubles.

The first round of the men's singles took place on 14 August 2007. Babungu lost 11–5 11–8 11–8 11–8 to Monday Merotohun of Nigeria. Luyindula lost 11–8 11–8 11–4 11–7 to O Il of North Korea.

The first round of the men's doubles took place on 15 August 2007. Babungu and Luyindula lost 11–3 11–4 11–6 11–4 to Petr Korbel and Richard Vyborny of Czech Republic.

| Athlete | Event | Round 1 | Round 2 | Round 3 | Round 4 | Quarterfinals | Semifinals | Final / BM | |
| Athlete | Event | Opposition Result | Opposition Result | Opposition Result | Opposition Result | Opposition Result | Opposition Result | Opposition Result | Rank |
|---|---|---|---|---|---|---|---|---|---|
| Momo Babungu | Men's singles | Merotohun (NGR); L 0–4 | did not advance | | | | | | |
| Jose Luyindula | Men's singles | O Il (PRK); L 0–4 | did not advance | | | | | | |
| Momo Babungu; Jose Luyindula | Men's doubles | — | Korbel/ Vyborny (CZE); L 0–4 | did not advance | | | | | |
