= Congo-Kinshasa at the 1968 Summer Olympics =

- Flag of Congo-Kinshasa
- IOC code: COD (COK used at these Games)
- NOC: Congolese Olympic Committee

in Mexico City
- Competitors: 5 in 1 sport
- Medals: Gold 0 Silver 0 Bronze 0 Total 0

Summer Olympics appearances
- 1968; 1972–1980; 1984; 1988; 1992; 1996; 2000; 2004; 2008; 2012; 2016; 2020; 2024

Congo-Kinshasa competed at the 1968 Summer Olympics in Mexico City, Mexico. It was the first time that the nation was represented at the Olympic Games. Five competitors, all men, took part in two events in the cycling.

== Cycling ==
Individual road race

- Jean Barnabe
- Constantin Kabemba
- Samuel Kibamba
- Ignace Mandjambi

Team time trial

- Constantin Kabemba
- François Ombanzi
- Jean Barnabe
- Samuel Kibamba
