= Democratic Republic of the Congo at the 2016 Summer Paralympics =

- Flag of the Democratic Republic of the Congo
- IPC code: COD
- NPC: Paralympic Committee of the Democratic Republic of the Congo

in Rio de Janeiro
- Competitors: 2 in 1 sports
- Medals: Gold 0 Silver 0 Bronze 0 Total 0

Summer Paralympics appearances (overview)
- 2012; 2016; 2020; 2024

The Democratic Republic of the Congo competed at the 2016 Summer Paralympics in Rio de Janeiro, Brazil, from 7 September to 18 September 2016.

== Disability classifications ==
Every participant at the Paralympics has their disability grouped into one of five disability categories; amputation, the condition may be congenital or sustained through injury or illness; cerebral palsy; wheelchair athletes, there is often overlap between this and other categories; visual impairment, including blindness; Les autres, any physical disability that does not fall strictly under one of the other categories, for example dwarfism or multiple sclerosis. Each Paralympic sport then has its own classifications, dependent upon the specific physical demands of competition. Events are given a code, made of numbers and letters, describing the type of event and classification of the athletes competing. Some sports, such as athletics, divide athletes by both the category and severity of their disabilities, other sports, for example swimming, group competitors from different categories together, the only separation being based on the severity of the disability.

== Athletics ==
Men's Track

Athlete	Events	Heat		Final	
Athlete	Events	Time	Rank	Time	Rank
Jhon Mwengani Mabonze	100 m T54	17.46	7	did not advance	

Women's Field

Athlete	Events	Result	Rank
Rosette Luyina Kiese	Shot Put F56-57	4.97	10

== See also ==
- Democratic Republic of the Congo at the 2016 Summer Olympics
