= Democratic Republic of the Congo at the Paralympics =

- Flag of the Democratic Republic of the Congo
- IPC code: COD
- NPC: Paralympic Committee of the Democratic Republic of the Congo
- Medals: Gold 0 Silver 0 Bronze 0 Total 0

Summer appearances
- 2012; 2016; 2020; 2024

Democratic Republic of the Congo first competed at the Paralympic Games in 2012, at the Summer Games in London, sending two wheelchair athletes to compete in track and field events.

The D.R. Congo has never taken part in the Winter Paralympic Games, and no athlete from this country has ever won a Paralympic medal.

== Full results for the DRC at the Paralympics ==
Name	Games	Sport	Event	Score	Rank
Levy Kitambala Kizito	2012 London	Athletics	Men's discus T57-58	27.23 m 265 pts	17th (out of 18)
Levy Kitambala Kizito	2012 London	Athletics	Men's javelin T57-58	18.37 m 138 pts	16th (out of 17)
Dedeline Mibamba Kimbata	2012 London	Athletics	Women's 100 m T54	23.08	7th in heat 2; did not advance
Dedeline Mibamba Kimbata	2012 London	Athletics	Women's discus F57-58	9.29 m 11 pts	17th (out of 18)
Jhon Mwengani Mabonze	2016 Rio	Athletics	Men's 100 m T54	17.46	7th in heat 3; did not advance
Rosette Luyina Kiese	2016 Rio	Athletics	Women's shot put F56-57	4.97 m	10th (out of 12)
Paulin Mayobom Mukendi	2020 Tokyo	Athletics	Men's shot put F57	9.66 m	12th (out of 15)
Rosette Luyina Kiese	2020 Tokyo	Athletics	Women's shot put F57	6.33 m	11th (out of 19)
Paulin Mayobom Mukendi	2024 Paris	Athletics	Men's shot put F57	9.92 m	9th (out of 12)
Nancy Nsenga Sala	2024 Paris	Athletics	Women's shot put F57	6.01 m	5th in qualification; did not advance

== See also ==
- Democratic Republic of the Congo at the Olympics
