= Democratic Republic of the Congo at the 2020 Summer Paralympics =

- Flag of Congo
- IPC code: COD

in Tokyo, Japan August 24, 2021 – September 5, 2021
- Competitors: 2 (1 man and 1 woman) in 1 sport
- Medals: Gold 0 Silver 0 Bronze 0 Total 0

Summer Paralympics appearances (overview)
- 2012; 2016; 2020; 2024

Democratic Republic of the Congo competed at the 2020 Summer Paralympics in Tokyo, Japan, from 24 August to 5 September 2021. This was their third consecutive appearance at the Summer Paralympics since 2012.

== Competitors ==
The following is the list of number of competitors participating in the Games:

Sport	Men	Women	Total
Athletics	1	1	2
Total	1	1	2

== Athletics ==
Men's field

Athlete	Event	Final	
Athlete	Event	Result	Rank
Paulin Mayobom Mukendi	Shot put	9.66	12

Women's field

Athlete	Event	Final	
Athlete	Event	Result	Rank
Rosette Luyina Kiese	Shot put F57	6.33	11

== See also ==
- Democratic Republic of the Congo at the Paralympics
- Democratic Republic of the Congo at the 2020 Summer Olympics
