= Democratic Republic of the Congo at the Olympics =

- Flag of the Democratic Republic of the Congo
- IOC code: COD
- NOC: Comité Olympique Congolais
- Medals: Gold 0 Silver 0 Bronze 0 Total 0

Summer appearances
- 1968; 1972–1980; 1984; 1988; 1992; 1996; 2000; 2004; 2008; 2012; 2016; 2020; 2024

The Democratic Republic of the Congo (DR Congo) first participated at the Olympic Games in 1968, when it was known as Congo Kinshasa. The nation's next Olympic appearance was sixteen years later in 1984, when it was known as Zaire. The nation has sent athletes to compete in every Summer Olympic Games since then, but has never participated in the Winter Olympic Games. By the 2000 Games, the nation was once again designated Democratic Republic of the Congo.

No athlete from DR Congo has ever won an Olympic medal, making it the largest country by area and the second most populous country in the world never to have done so, after Bangladesh.

The National Olympic Committee for DR Congo was created in 1963 and recognized by the International Olympic Committee in 1968.

== Medal tables ==
=== Medals by Summer Games ===
Games	Athletes	Gold	Silver	Bronze	Total	Rank
1968 Mexico City	5	0	0	0	0	–
(West Germany) 1972 Munich	did not participate					
(Canada) 1976 Montreal	did not participate					
(Soviet Union) 1980 Moscow	did not participate					
(United States) 1984 Los Angeles	8	0	0	0	0	–
(South Korea) 1988 Seoul	15	0	0	0	0	–
(Spain) 1992 Barcelona	17	0	0	0	0	–
(United States) 1996 Atlanta	14	0	0	0	0	–
(Australia) 2000 Sydney	2	0	0	0	0	–
(Greece) 2004 Athens	4	0	0	0	0	–
(China) 2008 Beijing	5	0	0	0	0	–
(United Kingdom) 2012 London	4	0	0	0	0	–
(Brazil) 2016 Rio de Janeiro	4	0	0	0	0	–
(Japan) 2020 Tokyo	7	0	0	0	0	–
(France) 2024 Paris	6	0	0	0	0	–
(United States) 2028 Los Angeles	future event					
(Australia) 2032 Brisbane	future event					
Total		0	0	0	0	–

== See also ==
- List of flag bearers for the Democratic Republic of the Congo at the Olympics
- Democratic Republic of the Congo at the Paralympics
- Category:Olympic competitors for the Democratic Republic of the Congo
