= Jean Barnabé =

Congolese cyclist

Personal information
- Born: 3 March 1949 (age 77) Leopoldville, Belgian Congo

Cycling career
- Sport: Cycling

Jean Barnabé (born 3 March 1949) is a former Congolese cyclist. He competed in the individual road race and the team time trial events at the 1968 Summer Olympics.

== Sporting career ==
Barnabe (also spelled Barnabé) competed in road bicycle racing. He represented Congo-Kinshasa at the 1968 Summer Olympics in Mexico City, where he was among the first athletes from his country to compete at the Olympic Games. He did not finish the individual road race. In the team time trial, the Congolese team of Constantin Kabemba, François Ombanzi, Jean Barnabe, and Samuel Kibamba finished in 30th place.
