= Democratic Republic of the Congo at the 2024 Summer Paralympics =

- Flag of Democratic Republic of the Congo
- IPC code: COD
- NPC: Paralympic Committee of the Democratic Republic of Congo

in Paris, France August 28, 2024 – September 8, 2024
- Competitors: 2 (1 man and 1 woman) in 1 sport
- Flag bearers: Paulin Mayombo Mukendi; Nancy Nsenga Sala
- Medals: Gold 0 Silver 0 Bronze 0 Total 0

Summer Paralympics appearances (overview)
- 2012; 2016; 2020; 2024

The Democratic Republic of Congo competed at the 2024 Summer Paralympics in Paris, France, from 28 August to 8 September 2024.

== Competitors ==
The following is the list of number of competitors in the Games.

Sport	Men	Women	Total
Athletics	1	1	2
Total	1	1	2

== Athletics ==
Key

- Note–Ranks given for track events are within the athlete's heat only
- Q = Qualified for the next round
- q = Qualified for the next round as a fastest loser or, in field events, by position without achieving the qualifying target
- DQ = Disqualified
- PR = Paralympic Record
- AR = Area (or continental) Record
- NR = National Record
- SB = Season's Best
- N/A = Round not applicable for the event
- Bye = Athlete not required to compete in round

Field Events
Men

Athlete	Event	Final	
Athlete	Event	Result	Rank
Paulin Mayombo Mukendi	Men's shot put F57	9.92	9

Women

Athlete	Event	Qualification		Final	
Athlete	Event	Result	Rank	Result	Rank
Nancy Nsenga Sala	Women's shot put F57	6.01	5	Did not advance	

== See also ==
- Democratic Republic of the Congo at the 2024 Summer Olympics
- Democratic Republic of the Congo at the Paralympics
