= Zaire at the 1983 World Championships in Athletics =

- Flag of Zaire
- WA code: ZAI

in Helsinki, Finland August 7–14, 1983
- Competitors: 2 (1 man and 1 woman) in 4 events
- Medals: Gold 0 Silver 0 Bronze 0 Total 0

World Championships in Athletics appearances
- 1983; 1987; 1991; 1993; 1995; 1997; 1999; 2001; 2003; 2005; 2007; 2009; 2011; 2013; 2015; 2017; 2019; 2022; 2023

Zaire (now called the Democratic Republic of the Congo) competed at the 1983 World Championships in Athletics in Helsinki, Finland, from August 7 to 14, 1983.

== Men ==
Track and road events

Athlete	Event	Heat		Semifinal		Final	
Athlete	Event	Result	Rank	Result	Rank	Result	Rank
Masini Situ-Kubanza	1500 metres	4:06.44	49	Did not advance			
Masini Situ-Kubanza	5000 metres	15:02.26	32	Did not advance			

== Women ==
Track and road events

Athlete	Event	Heat		Semifinal		Final	
Athlete	Event	Result	Rank	Result	Rank	Result	Rank
Christine Bakombo	800 metres	2:19.68	21	Did not advance			
Christine Bakombo	1500 metres	4:54.12	22	—		Did not advance	
