= Zaina (given name) =

Zaina is a given name. Notable people with the given name include:

- Zaina Agoro, Nigerian American singer-songwriter
- Zaina Erhaim, Syrian journalist and feminist
- Zaina Hassan (born 2004), Jordanian footballer
- Zaina Kapepula (born 1975), Congolese basketball player

== See also ==
- Zaina, surname
