= Democratic Republic of the Congo at the 2000 Summer Olympics =

- Flag of the Democratic Republic of the Congo
- IOC code: COD
- NOC: Comité Olympique Congolais

in Sydney
- Competitors: 2 in 1 sport
- Flag bearer: Willy Kalombo Mwenze
- Medals: Gold 0 Silver 0 Bronze 0 Total 0

Summer Olympics appearances (overview)
- 1968; 1972–1980; 1984; 1988; 1992; 1996; 2000; 2004; 2008; 2012; 2016; 2020; 2024

The Democratic Republic of the Congo competed at the 2000 Summer Olympics in Sydney, Australia. The games marked the country's first appearance under its current moniker; in 1968, it was represented as Congo-Kinshasa, and from 1984 to 1996, it was represented as Zaire.

== Competitors ==
The following is the list of number of competitors in the Games.

Sport	Men	Women	Total
Athletics	1	1	2
Total	1	1	2

== Athletics ==
Key

- Note–Ranks given for track events are within the athlete's heat only
- Q = Qualified for the next round
- q = Qualified for the next round as a fastest loser or, in field events, by position without achieving the qualifying target
- NR = National record
- N/A = Round not applicable for the event
- Bye = Athlete not required to compete in round

Men
Track and road events

Athletes	Events	Heat Round 1		Heat Round 2		Semifinal		Final	
Athletes	Events	Time	Rank	Time	Rank	Time	Rank	Time	Rank
Willy Kalombo	Marathon	—						did not finish	

Women
Track and road events

Athletes	Events	Heat Round 1		Heat Round 2		Semifinal		Final	
Athletes	Events	Time	Rank	Time	Rank	Time	Rank	Time	Rank
Akonga Nsimbo	100 metres	12.51	66	did not advance					
Akonga Nsimbo	200 metres	25.35	49	did not advance					
