= Kyrychenko =

Kyrychenko (Ukrainian: Кириченко) is a gender-neutral Ukrainian surname.

== People ==
=== Kyrychenko ===
- Daryna Kyrychenko (born 1998), Ukrainian snowboarder
- Ruslana Kyrychenko (born 1975), Ukrainian basketball player
- Svitlana Kyrychenko (1935–2016), Ukrainian human rights activist

== See also ==
- Kirichenko
