= Luyindula =

Luyindula is a surname. Notable people with the surname include:

- José Luyindula (born 1986), Congolese table tennis player
- Peguy Luyindula (born 1979), Congolese-French footballer
