= Congo at the Olympics =

Republic of the Congo Democratic Republic of the Congo

Congo at the Olympics may refer to:

- Republic of the Congo at the Olympics
- Democratic Republic of the Congo at the Olympics
