= Bettinson =

Bettinson is a surname. Notable people with the surname include:

- Les Bettinson, rugby league player, coach, and administrator
- Laura Bettinson, stage name FEMME, British singer, songwriter, and producer
- John Bettinson (born 1940), British cyclist
- Arthur Frederick Bettinson, boxer
