= Table tennis at the 2004 Summer Olympics – Men's singles =

Table tennis at the Olympics

Table tennis – Men's singles at the Games of the XXVIII Olympiad
- Venue: Galatsi Olympic Hall
- Date: 14 to 23 August 2004
- Competitors: 64 from 39 nations

Medalists
1st place, gold medalist(s)		Ryu Seung-min	South Korea
2nd place, silver medalist(s)		Wang Hao	China
3rd place, bronze medalist(s)		Wang Liqin	China

These are the results of the men's singles competition, one of two events for male competitors in table tennis at the 2004 Summer Olympics in Athens.

== Qualifying Athletes ==
Athlete	Country
Mohamed Gueye	Senegal
Torben Wosik	Germany
Liu Song	Argentina
Shu Arai	Japan
Sharath Kamal	India
Mohamaed Boudjadja	Algeria
Monday Merotohun	Nigeria
Momo Babungu	Democratic Republic of the Congo
Kien Quoc Doan	Vietnam
Min Yang	Italy
Khoa Nguyen	United States
William Henzell	Australia
Ryo Yuzawa	Japan
Lin Ju	Dominican Republic
Tomasz Krzeszewski	Poland
Hugo Hoyama	Brazil
Koji Matsushita	Japan
Trevor Brown	Australia
Juan Papic	Chile
Ilija Lupulesku	United States
O Il	North Korea
Jose Luyindula	Democratic Republic of the Congo
Panagiotis Gionis	Greece
He Zhi Wen	Spain
Mohammad Reza Akhlaghpasand	Iran
Thiago Monteiro	Brazil
Segun Toriola	Nigeria
Pablo Tabachnik	Argentina
Aleksandar Karakašević	Serbia and Montenegro
Khalid Al-Harbi	Saudi Arabia
Russ Lavale	Australia
Srdjan Milicevic	Bosnia and Herzegovina
Trinko Keen	Netherlands
Slobodan Grujić	Serbia and Montenegro
Ko Lai Chak	Hong Kong
Jörgan Persson	Sweden
Peter Karlsson	Sweden
Chen Weixing	Austria
Alexey Smirnov	Russia
Jörg Roßkopf	Germany
Danny Heister	Netherlands
Adrian Crişan	Romania
Leung Chu Yan	Hong Kong
Lucjan Błaszczyk	Poland
Li Ching	Hong Kong
Patrick Chila	France
Wenguan Johnny Huang	Canada
Zoran Primorac	Croatia
Wang Liqin	China
Joo Se-Hyuk	South Korea
Petr Korbel	Czech Republic
Kalinikos Kreanga	Greece
Chuang Chih-yuan	Chinese Taipei
Oh Sang-Eun	South Korea
Jean-Michel Saive	Belgium
Wang Hao	China
Ryu Seung-Min	South Korea
Chian Peng-lung	Chinese Taipei
Michael Maze	Denmark
Vladimir Samsonov	Belarus
Werner Schlager	Austria
Timo Boll	Germany
Jan-Ove Waldner	Sweden
Ma Lin	China

== Seeds ==
The top 16 seeded players qualified directly to the third round.

1. Wang Liqin (CHN) (semifinals, bronze medalist)
2. Ma Lin (CHN) (fourth round)
3. Ryu Seung-min (KOR) (champion, gold medalist)
4. Wang Hao (CHN) (final, silver medalist)
5. Chuang Chih-yuan (TPE) (quarterfinals)
6. Vladimir Samsonov (BLR) (fourth round)
7. Werner Schlager (AUT) (fourth round)
8. Kalinikos Kreanga (GRE) (third round)
9. Timo Boll (GER) (quarterfinals)
10. Chiang Peng-lung (TPE) (fourth round)
11. Joo Se-hyuk (KOR) (fourth round)
12. Jean-Michel Saive (BEL) (third round)
13. Oh Sang-eun (KOR) (fourth round)
14. Petr Korbel (CZE) (third round)
15. Michael Maze (DEN) (third round)
16. Jan-Ove Waldner (SWE) (semifinals, fourth place)

The players seeded from 17 to 32 qualified directly to the second round.

17. Chen Weixing (AUT) (third round)
18. Jörgen Persson (SWE) (fourth round)
19. Peter Karlsson (SWE) (third round)
20. Alexey Smirnov (RUS) (second round)
21. Zoran Primorac (CRO) (third round)
22. Lucjan Błaszczyk (POL) (third round)
23. Jörg Roßkopf (GER) (third round)
24. Trinko Keen (NED) (third round)
25. Ko Lai Chak (HKG) (quarterfinals)
26. Adrian Crișan (ROU) (third round)
27. Slobodan Grujić (SCG) (second round)
28. Patrick Chila (FRA) (third round)
29. Li Ching (HKG) (third round)
30. Leung Chu Yan (HKG) (quarterfinals)
31. Wenguan Johnny Huang (CAN) (second round)
32. Danny Heister (NED) (second round)

== Draw ==
=== Finals ===
Semifinals
1	Wang Liqin (CHN)	8	5	11	9	3
4	Wang Hao (CHN)	11	11	6	11	11
3	Ryu Seung-min (KOR)	11	9	11	11	11
16	Jan-Ove Waldner (SWE)	9	11	9	5	5

Gold medal match
4	Wang Hao (CHN)	3	11	9	9	13	9
3	Ryu Seung-min (KOR)	11	9	11	11	11	11
Bronze medal match
1	Wang Liqin (CHN)	10	11	11	11	11
16	Jan-Ove Waldner (SWE)	12	3	8	7	9

=== Top half ===
==== Section 1 ====
Second round
24	T Keen (NED)	11	10	7	11	5	13	11
33	T Wosik (GER)	9	12	11	5	11	11	9
27	S Grujić (SCG)	4	7	11	2	12
41	Liu S (ARG)	11	11	4	11	14
25	Ko LC (HKG)	11	11	11	11
49	Achanta SK (IND)	9	5	9	6
18	J Persson (SWE)	9	11	11	11	11
52	M Merotohun (NGR)	11	5	5	7	8

Third round
1	Wang L (CHN)	6	11	11	11	11
24	T Keen (NED)	11	1	8	4	2
11	Joo S-h (KOR)	14	11	11	11
41	Liu S (ARG)	12	9	6	8
14	P Korbel (CZE)	7	11	7	11	6	11	7
25	Ko LC (HKG)	11	9	11	2	11	9	11
8	K Kreanga (GRE)	5	7	9	8
18	J Persson (SWE)	11	11	11	11

Fourth round
1	Wang L (CHN)	11	11	9	11	11
11	Joo S-h (KOR)	7	8	11	6	6
25	Ko LC (HKG)	11	11	8	11	12
18	J Persson (SWE)	7	6	11	4	10

Quarterfinals
1	Wang L (CHN)	11	13	6	11	11
25	Ko LC (HKG)	9	11	11	8	4

==== Section 2 ====
Second round
19	P Karlsson (SWE)	11	11	11	9	7	11	11
35	M Yang (ITA)	9	4	8	11	11	13	9
17	Chen W (AUT)	11	11	12	11
51	W Henzell (AUS)	7	3	10	6
20	A Smirnov (RUS)	9	11	4	5	6
48	Lin J (DOM)	11	7	11	11	11
23	J Roßkopf (GER)	6	11	11	17	13
37	T Krzeszewski (POL)	11	8	7	15	11

Third round
5	Chuang C-y (TPE)	16	11	8	11	11	11
19	P Karlsson (SWE)	18	6	11	7	3	8
13	Oh S-e (KOR)	7	11	11	11	5	9	11
17	Chen W (AUT)	11	6	7	8	11	11	2
12	J-M Saive (BEL)	5	4	11	13	16	8
48	Lin J (DOM)	11	11	5	11	18	11
4	Wang H (CHN)	11	12	11	11	11
23	J Roßkopf (GER)	5	10	5	13	6

Fourth round
5	Chuang C-y (TPE)	12	12	6	12	9	11
13	Oh S-e (KOR)	10	10	11	10	11	5
48	Lin J (DOM)	5	7	11	10	7
4	Wang H (CHN)	11	11	7	12	11

Quarterfinals
5	Chuang C-y (TPE)	11	10	11	4	6	7
4	Wang H (CHN)	5	12	9	11	11	11

=== Bottom half ===
==== Section 3 ====
Second round
32	D Heister (NED)	7	7	8	4
34	K Matsushita (JPN)	11	11	11	11
26	A Crişan (ROU)	11	11	15	11
44	I Lupulesku (USA)	9	8	13	8
30	Leung CY (HKG)	11	11	11	11	11
47	O I (PRK)	3	9	13	4	8
22	L Błaszczyk (POL)	11	10	11	8	7	11	11
36	He Z (ESP)	5	12	2	11	11	6	9

Third round
3	Ryu S-m (KOR)	11	11	11	11
34	K Matsushita (JPN)	9	6	6	2
10	Chiang P-l (TPE)	11	11	12	2	11
26	A Crişan (ROU)	9	5	10	11	8
15	M Maze (DEN)	11	5	3	8	9
30	Leung CY (HKG)	6	11	11	11	11
6	V Samsonov (BLR)	11	5	12	8	11	11
22	L Błaszczyk (POL)	5	11	10	11	4	9

Fourth round
3	Ryu S-m (KOR)	11	11	7	8	11	6	11
10	Chiang P-l (TPE)	6	6	11	11	3	11	4
30	Leung CY (HKG)	11	6	11	6	11	7	11
6	V Samsonov (BLR)	7	11	9	11	5	11	8

Quarterfinals
3	Ryu S-m (KOR)	6	10	11	11	11	11
30	Leung CY (HKG)	11	12	6	6	9	5

==== Section 4 ====
Second round
29	Li C (HKG)	11	9	11	11	11
45	T Monteiro (BRA)	6	11	7	9	5
28	P Chila (FRA)	11	8	10	11	11	11
39	S Toriola (NGR)	3	11	12	7	8	9
31	WJ Huang (CAN)	11	8	5	11	9	9
38	A Karakašević (SCG)	7	11	11	9	11	11
21	Z Primorac (CRO)	8	11	11	11	11
50	S Milicevic (BIH)	11	6	7	8	8

Third round
7	W Schlager (AUT)	8	11	12	11	11	11
29	Li C (HKG)	11	9	14	9	9	6
9	T Boll (GER)	11	14	11	11	11
28	P Chila (FRA)	3	16	9	3	9
16	J-O Waldner (SWE)	13	11	5	11	10	11
38	A Karakašević (SCG)	11	9	11	6	12	9
2	Ma L (CHN)	11	11	11	9	11
21	Z Primorac (CRO)	5	3	3	11	5

Fourth round
7	W Schlager (AUT)	2	14	5	9	11	11	6
9	T Boll (GER)	11	12	11	11	6	4	11
16	J-O Waldner (SWE)	11	12	7	11	11
2	Ma L (CHN)	9	10	11	5	9

Quarterfinals
9	T Boll (GER)	7	11	11	7	11
16	J-O Waldner (SWE)	11	13	6	11	13

== Preliminary round ==
=== Top half ===
==== Section 1 ====
First round
62	M Guèye (SEN)	4	5	6	4
33	T Wosik (GER)	11	11	11	11
41	Liu S (ARG)	11	7	12	11	11
46	S Arai (JPN)	7	11	10	5	4
49	Achanta SK (IND)	11	12	11	11	11
61	M Boudjadja (ALG)	4	10	6	13	7
52	M Merotohun (NGR)	11	11	11	11
63	M Babungu (COD)	5	8	8	8

==== Section 2 ====
First round
53	Doan KQ (VIE)	5	13	7	5	5
35	M Yang (ITA)	11	11	11	11	11
56	K Nguyen (USA)	7	11	7	4	9
51	W Henzell (AUS)	11	6	11	11	11
40	R Yuzawa (JPN)	8	11	8	3	9
48	Lin J (DOM)	11	7	11	11	11
37	T Krzeszewski (POL)	12	11	11	11
43	H Hoyama (BRA)	10	4	4	8

=== Bottom half ===
==== Section 3 ====
First round
34	K Matsushita (JPN)	11	11	11	11
58	T Brown (AUS)	4	6	9	3
55	J Papic (CHI)	2	4	5	2
44	I Lupulesku (USA)	11	11	11	11
47	O I (PRK)	11	11	11	11
64	J Luyindula (COD)	8	8	4	7
42	P Gionis (GRE)	7	11	4	13	13
36	He Z (ESP)	11	13	11	11	15

==== Section 4 ====
First round
59	MR Akhlaghpasand (IRI)	8	13	9	7	5
45	T Monteiro (BRA)	11	11	11	11	11
39	S Toriola (NGR)	12	11	11	11	11
57	P Tabachnik (ARG)	10	8	13	3	8
38	A Karakašević (SCG)	11	11	11	11
60	K Al-Harbi (KSA)	9	3	3	5
54	R Lavale (AUS)	12	9	4	11	16	11
50	S Miličević (BIH)	10	11	11	9	18	13
