= Mboma (surname) =

Mboma is a surname, and may refer to:

- Patrick Mboma, a Cameroonian footballer
- Christine Mboma, a Namibian sprinter
- André Kimbu Mboma, a Congolese boxer
