= Zaire at the 1992 Summer Olympics =

- Flag of Zaire
- IOC code: ZAI
- NOC: Comité National Olympique Zaïrois

in Barcelona
- Competitors: 17 (15 men, 2 women) in 4 sports
- Medals: Gold 0 Silver 0 Bronze 0 Total 0

Summer Olympics appearances (overview)
- 1968; 1972–1980; 1984; 1988; 1992; 1996; 2000; 2004; 2008; 2012; 2016; 2020; 2024

Zaire (now called the Democratic Republic of the Congo) competed at the 1992 Summer Olympics in Barcelona, Spain. Seventeen competitors, fifteen men and two women, took part in fourteen events in four sports.

== Competitors ==
The following is the list of number of competitors in the Games.

Sport	Men	Women	Total
Athletics	5	2	7
Boxing	1	–	1
Cycling	3	0	3
Judo	6	0	6
Total	15	2	17

== Athletics ==
Men
Track and road events

Athlete	Event	Heats		Quarterfinal		Semifinal		Final	
Athlete	Event	Result	Rank	Result	Rank	Result	Rank	Result	Rank
Ilunga Kafila	800 metres	1:57.73	52	—		Did not advance			
Kaleka Mutoke	1500 metres	3:53.71	40	—		Did not advance			
Willy Kalombo	Marathon	—						2:23:47	50
Ilunga Kafila; Luasa Batungile; Kaleka Mutoke; Shintu Kibambe	4 × 400 metres relay	3:21.91	21	—				Did not advance	

Women
Track and road events

Athlete	Event	Heats		Quarterfinal		Semifinal		Final	
Athlete	Event	Result	Rank	Result	Rank	Result	Rank	Result	Rank
Muyegbe Mubala	100 metres	12.76	51	Did not advance					
Christine Bakombo	Marathon	—						3:29:10	37

== Boxing ==
Athlete	Event	Round of 32	Round of 16	Quarterfinals	Semifinals	Final	
Athlete	Event	Opposition Result	Opposition Result	Opposition Result	Opposition Result	Opposition Result	Rank
Mohamed Siluvangi	Middleweight	Bye	Johnson (CAN); L RSC R3	Did not advance			

== Cycling ==
Three cyclists represented Zaire in 1992.

=== Road ===
Men

Athlete	Event	Time	Rank
Mobange Amisi	Road race	DNF	
Selenge Kimoto	Road race	DNF	
Ndjibu N'Golomingi	Road race	DNF	

== Judo ==
Men

Athlete	Event	Round of 64	Round of 32	Round of 16	Quarterfinals	Semifinals	Repechage				Final	
Athlete	Event	Round of 64	Round of 32	Round of 16	Quarterfinals	Semifinals	Round 1	Round 2	Round 3	Round 4	Final	
Athlete	Event	Opposition Result	Opposition Result	Opposition Result	Opposition Result	Opposition Result	Opposition Result	Opposition Result	Opposition Result	Opposition Result	Opposition Result	Rank
Bosolo Mobando	60 kg	Hien (BUR); W	Mohamed (KUW); L	Did not advance								
Dikubenga Mavatiku	65 kg	Csák (HUN); L	Did not advance				Netov (BUL); L	Did not advance				
Lusambu Mafuta	71 kg	de Jesús (ANG); W	Dott (GER); L	Did not advance			—	Carabetta (FRA); L	Did not advance			
Musuyu Kutama	78 kg	Zsoldos (HUN); L	Did not advance									
Ilualoma Isako	86 kg	—	Mayounga (CAF); W	Franco (CUB); L	Did not advance							
Mamute Mbonga	95 kg	Bye	Miguel (BRA); L	Did not advance								
