= Franka Magali =

Congolese athletics competitor (born 1990)

Franka Magali (born 24 January 1990 in Lyon, France) is a track and field sprint athlete who competes internationally for the Democratic Republic of the Congo.

Magali represented DR Congo at the 2008 Summer Olympics in Beijing. She competed at the 100 metres sprint and placed eighth in her heat without advancing to the second round. She ran the distance in a time of 12.57 seconds.

Olympic Games
Preceded by Gary Kikaya	Flagbearer for Democratic Republic of the Congo; Beijing 2008	Succeeded by Ilunga Mande Zatara
