= Jiang Guang-nan =

Taiwanese cyclist

Personal information
- Full name: 蔣 光南, Pinyin: Jiǎng Guāng-nán
- Born: 30 July 1948 (age 78) Kaohsiung City, Taiwan
- Height: 5 ft 7 in (170 cm)
- Weight: 62 kg (137 lb)

Cycling career
- Sport: Cycling

Jiang Guang-nan (born 30 July 1948) is a former Taiwanese cyclist. He competed in team time trial at the 1968 Summer Olympics.
