= Mohamed Sofiane Boudjadja =

Algerian table tennis player

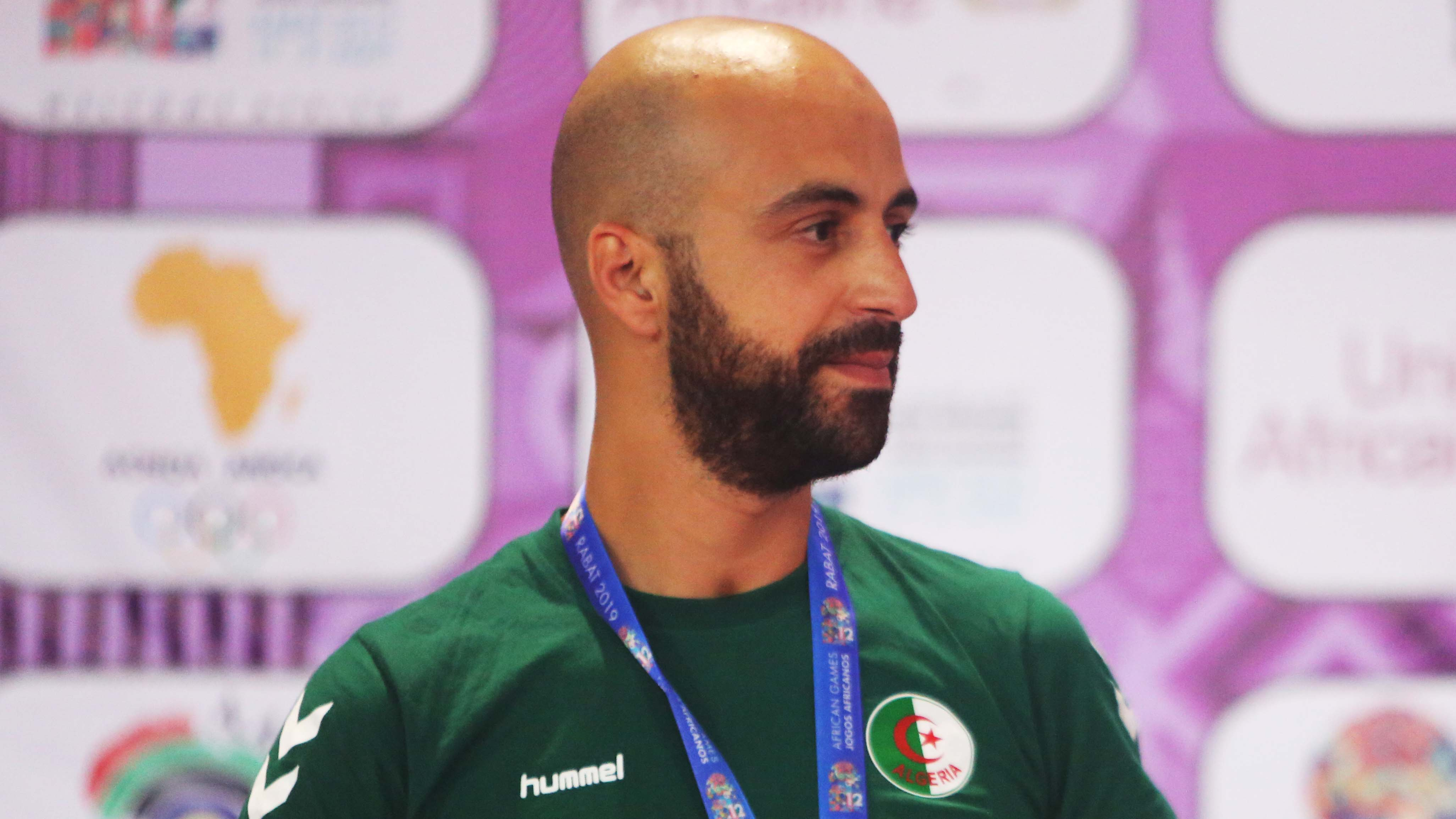

Personal information
- Full name: Mohamed Sofiane Boudjadja
- Nationality: Algerian
- Born: 8 November 1983 (age 42) Paris, France

Sport
- Sport: Table tennis

Mohamed Sofiane Boudjadja (born 8 November 1983) is an Algerian table tennis player. He competed in the men's singles event at the 2004 Summer Olympics in Athens.

Mohamed started his international career in 1998 when he was a junior. In 2001, he became Vice Champion of Africa in the hope category. He made his senior team debut and won an individual bronze medal at the 2002 Arab Championships in Jordan. He then established himself as an integral member of the Algerian national senior team. He participated in six World Table Tennis Championships between 2003 and 2010.

He notably distinguished himself at the African Games. He has participated in all editions since 2003, i.e. five times. At the 2003, 2007, and 2011 editions, taking place successively in Nigeria, Algeria, and Mozambique, he won bronze medal in the team event. Along with Sami Kherouf, Boudjadja won the men's doubles title at the 2019 African Games in Rabat, Morocco.

He won a bronze medal with the Algerian national team in 2004, during the Pan Arab Games hosted by Algeria. He obtained two additional bronze medals at the 2005 Islamic Solidarity Games, held in Saudi Arabia, in the team event and double event alongside his compatriot Fatah Ourahmoune.
