= Cédric Mandembo =

Congolese judoka

Personal information
- Full name: Cédric Mandembo Kebika
- Born: April 4, 1984 (age 42) Kinshasa, Democratic Republic of the Congo
- Occupation: Judoka

Sport
- Sport: Judo
Medal record
Men's judo
Representing the Democratic Republic of the Congo
African Championships
| Bronze medal – third place | 2009 Mauritius | +100 kg |
Jeux de la Francophonie
| Bronze medal – third place | 2009 Beirut | +100 kg |

Profile at external databases
- JudoInside.com: 67486

Cédric Mandembo Kebika (born 4 April 1984) is a Congolese judoka. Born in Kinshasa, he would eventually compete at the 2009 Jeux de la Francophonie and the 2009 African Judo Championships, winning bronze medals in both competitions. He had qualified for the 2012 Summer Olympics after being the highest ranked African judoka outside of the top 22.

He competed in the +100 kg event but lost to eventual silver medalist Alexander Mikhaylin in the first round through ippon. Kebika was then designated as the flag bearer for the nation at the 2012 Summer Olympics closing ceremony. Though after the ceremony, he and four other members of the delegation had disappeared in an attempt to seek asylum in England. He eventually made his return to judo in 2014.

== Biography ==
Cédric Mandembo Kebika was born on 4 April 1984 in Kinshasa, Democratic Republic of the Congo. His first international appearance would be at the Mauritius International Judo Tournament. He would compete in the under 100 kg event and had won the silver medal on 29 January 2008.

His first international medals would be at the 2009 Jeux de la Francophonie in Beirut, Lebanon, and the 2009 African Judo Championships in Mauritius. He competed first in the latter and had won the bronze medal in the +100 kg event on 3 May 2009. A few months later, he earned the bronze medal in the former, also in the +100 kg event. Among his other competitions were the 2010 African Judo Championships in Yaoundé, Cameroon, and 2011 African Judo Championships in Dakar, Senegal.

His last tournament before the 2012 Summer Olympics would be the Grand Slam Rio de Janeiro, where he had placed fifth. Kebika had qualified for the 2012 Summer Games in London after he was the highest ranked African judoka outside of the top 22 athletes that have directly qualified. At the time, he was ranked 112th in the world and had scored 18 points.

He was coached by Ibula Masengo. He competed in Pool D of the men's 100 kg event on 28 July against Alexander Mikhaylin of Russia. Kebika had lost the match in 49 seconds with a score of 1010 to 0 after Mikhaylin had done a okuri eri jime to score an ippon. Kebika did not advance further while Mikhaylin would be the eventual silver medalist. After the competitions, he was designated as the flag bearer for the nation at the 2012 Summer Olympics closing ceremony.

After the closing ceremony had concluded, Mandembo, his coach, boxing coach Blaise Bekwa, and athletics coach Guy Nkita were reported missing in London in attempt to seek asylum in England. In 2014, he made his return to judo at the International Tournament Maubeuge, placing third.
