= Cycling at the 1968 Summer Olympics – Men's team time trial =

Men's cycling team time trial at the Games of the XIX Olympiad
- Venue: Mexico City; 100.00 km (62.1 mi)
- Date: 15 October 1968
- Competitors: 120 from 30 nations
- Winning time: 2:07:49.06

Medalists
1st place, gold medalist(s)		Fedor den Hertog, Jan Krekels, René Pijnen, Joop Zoetemelk	Netherlands
2nd place, silver medalist(s)		Erik Pettersson, Gösta Pettersson, Sture Pettersson, Tomas Pettersson	Sweden
3rd place, bronze medalist(s)		Giovanni Bramucci, Vittorio Marcelli, Mauro Simonetti, Pierfranco Vianelli	Italy

These are the official results of the Men's Team Time Trial at the 1968 Summer Olympics in Mexico City, Mexico, held on 15 October 1968. There were 120 participants from 30 nations.

== Final classification ==
Rank	Name	Nationality	Time
1st place, gold medalist(s)	Fedor den Hertog; Jan Krekels; René Pijnen; Joop Zoetemelk	Netherlands	2:07:49.06
2nd place, silver medalist(s)	Erik Pettersson; Gösta Pettersson; Sture Pettersson; Tomas Pettersson	Sweden	2:09:26.60
3rd place, bronze medalist(s)	Giovanni Bramucci; Vittorio Marcelli; Mauro Simonetti; Pierfranco Vianelli	Italy	2:10:18.74
4	Verner Blaudzun; Jørgen Emil Hansen; Ole Højlund Pedersen; Leif Mortensen	Denmark	2:12:41.41
5	Thorleif Andresen; Ørnulf Andresen; Tore Milsett; Leif Yli	Norway	2:14:32.85
6	Jan Magiera; Zenon Czechowski; Marian Kegel; Andrzej Bławdzin	Poland	2:14:40.98
7	Juan Alberto Merlos; Carlos Miguel Álvarez; Roberto Breppe; Ernesto Contreras	Argentina	2:15:34.24
8	Burkhard Ebert; Jürgen Tschan; Ortwin Czarnowski; Dieter Koslar	West Germany	2:15:37.25
9	Boris Shukhov; Aleksandr Dokhlyakov; Yury Dmitriyev; Valery Yardy	Soviet Union	2:15:39.58
10	Agustín Alcántara; Adolfo Belmonte; Roberto Brito; Radamés Treviño	Mexico	2:16:08.44
11	John Bettison; Roy Cromack; Pete Smith; John Watson	Great Britain	2:16:38.60
12	Nemesio Jiménez; José Gómez; José González; Miguel Lasa	Spain	2:16:38.90
13	Klaus Ampler; Günter Hoffmann; Dieter Grabe; Axel Peschel	East Germany	2:17:51.29
14	Donald Wilson; Kevin Morgan; Peter McDermott; Dave Watson	Australia	2:18:09.09
15	Jean-Pierre Boulard; Robert Bouloux; Jean-Pierre Danguillaume; Claude le Chatellier	France	2:18:35.82
16	Cvitko Bilić; Rudi Valenčič; Tanasije Kuvalja; Franc Škerlj	Yugoslavia	2:18:52.20
17	András Takács; András Mészáros; Imre Géra; Tibor Magyar	Hungary	2:20:30.36
18	Michel Coulon; Frans Mintjens; Marcel Grifnée; Englebert Opdebeeck	Belgium	2:20:52.93
19	Mauno Uusivirta; Ole Wackström; Raimo Honkanen; Raimo Suikkanen	Finland	2:20:55.47
20	John Howard; Oliver Martin; John Allis; Jim Van Boven	United States	2:24:13.50
21	Evaristo Oliva; Francisco Cuque; Jorge Inés; Saturnino Rustrián	Guatemala	2:24:20.7
22	Arnulfo Pozo; Hipólito Pozo; Noé Medina; Victor Morales	Ecuador	2:25:15.26
23	Neil Lyster; Richie Thomson; John Dean; Des Thomson	New Zealand	2:25:46.47
24	Luis Sosa; Walter Garre; Jorge Jukich; René Deceja	Uruguay	2:25:47.20
25	Joe Jones; Jules Béland; Marcel Roy; Yves Landry	Canada	2:27:18.14
26	Yemane Negassi; Fisihasion Ghebreyesus; Mikael Saglimbeni; Tekeste Woldu	Ethiopia	2:30:36.79
27	Adrián Solano; José Sánchez; José Manuel Soto; Miguel Ángel Sánchez	Costa Rica	2:36:25.79
28	Roberto García; Francisco Funes; Juan Molina; Mauricio Bolaños	El Salvador	2:39:38.39
29	Deng Chueng-hwai; Liu Cheng-tao; Shue Ming-shu; Jiang Guang-nan	Chinese Taipei	2:42:13.88
30	Constantin Kabemba; François Ombanzi; Jean Barnabé; Samuel Kibamba	Congo-Kinshasa	2:42:57.58
