= Mohamed Guèye =

Senegalese table tennis player (born 1983)

Personal information
- Nationality: Senegalese
- Born: 25 November 1983 (age 42)

Sport
- Sport: Table tennis

Mohamed Guèye (born 25 November 1983) is a Senegalese table tennis player. He competed in the men's singles event at the 2004 Summer Olympics.
