= Democratic Republic of the Congo at the 2012 Summer Olympics =

- Flag of the Democratic Republic of the Congo
- IOC code: COD
- NOC: Comité Olympique Congolais

in London
- Competitors: 4 in 3 sports
- Flag bearers: Ilunga Mande Zatara (opening); Cédric Mandembo (closing)
- Medals: Gold 0 Silver 0 Bronze 0 Total 0

Summer Olympics appearances (overview)
- 1968; 1972–1980; 1984; 1988; 1992; 1996; 2000; 2004; 2008; 2012; 2016; 2020; 2024

The Democratic Republic of the Congo competed at the 2012 Summer Olympics in London, United Kingdom from 27 July to 12 August 2012. This was the nation's ninth appearance at the Olympics since its debut in 1968, although four of its appearances were under the name "Zaire", and the first appearance was under the name "Congo Kinshasa".

Four athletes from the Democratic Republic of the Congo were selected to the team, 3 men and 1 woman, to compete only in athletics, boxing, and judo. Marathon runner Ilunga Mande Zatara was the nation's flag bearer at the opening ceremony. Democratic Republic of Congo, however, has yet to win its first Olympic medal.

On the day after the closing ceremonies, four members from the national delegation were reported missing in London: judoka Cédric Mandembo and his coach Ibula Masengo, boxing coach Blaise Bekwa, and athletics coach Guy Nkita.

== Athletics ==
Key

- Note–Ranks given for track events are within the athlete's heat only
- Q = Qualified for the next round
- q = Qualified for the next round as a fastest loser or, in field events, by position without achieving the qualifying target
- NR = National record
- N/A = Round not applicable for the event
- Bye = Athlete not required to compete in round

Men

Athlete	Event	Final	
Athlete	Event	Result	Rank
Ilunga Mande Zatara	Marathon	DNF	

Women

Athlete	Event	Heat		Semifinal		Final	
Athlete	Event	Result	Rank	Result	Rank	Result	Rank
Chancel Ilunga Sankuru	1500 m	5:05.25	14	Did not advance			

== Boxing ==
DR Congo qualified one boxer for the Games; Meji Mwamba competed in the men's super heavyweight division.

Athlete	Event	Round of 16	Quarterfinals	Semifinals	Final	
Athlete	Event	Opposition Result	Opposition Result	Opposition Result	Opposition Result	Rank
Meji Mwamba	Men's super heavyweight	Majidov (AZE); L RSC	Did not advance			

== Judo ==
DR Congo qualified a single judoka.

Athlete	Event	Round of 32	Round of 16	Quarterfinals	Semifinals	Repechage	Final / BM	
Athlete	Event	Opposition Result	Opposition Result	Opposition Result	Opposition Result	Opposition Result	Opposition Result	Rank
Cédric Mandembo	Men's +100 kg	Mikhailine (RUS); L 0000–0100	Did not advance					

== See also ==
- DR Congo at the 2012 Summer Paralympics
