= Jean-Pierre Boulard =

French cyclist

Personal information
- Born: 3 December 1942 (age 83) Épernay, France

Cycling career
- Sport: Cycling
- Role: Rider

Jean-Pierre Boulard (born 3 December 1942) is a French former cyclist. His sporting career began with Pedale Chalone. He competed in the team time trial at the 1968 Summer Olympics. He also won the 1968 Tour de l'Avenir.
