= Srđan Miličević =

Bosnian table tennis player

Personal information
- Nationality: Bosnian
- Born: 2 November 1976 (age 48); Doboj, Yugoslavia

Sport
- Sport: Table tennis

Srđan Miličević (born 2 November 1976) is a Bosnian table tennis player. He competed in the men's singles event at the 2004 Summer Olympics.

== Biography ==
Srđan Miličević learned his first table tennis moves when he was seven years old at STK Sloga from Doboj.

After that, he performed at world and European competitions in junior competitions, while in 1997 he played in the quarter-finals of the World Championship for players up to 22 years of age in Japan. At the Olympic Games in Athens (Greece) in 2004, he placed in the second round of the competition, achieving the best result for Bosnia and Herzegovina in that competition. A year later, Miličević played in the quarter-final round of the tournament at the Mediterranean Games in Almeria (Spain).

In 2009, he became the champion of Bosnia and Herzegovina in singles and doubles competition, while playing for STK Vogošća, at the Team Championship of Bosnia and Herzegovina, he won a silver medal. He performed at the Mediterranean Games in Pescara (Italy) in 2009. In his long career, he played for clubs from Spain and Italy, while he made it to the playoffs of the Spanish Premier League with Cartagena. Based on the results, Miličević found himself in the competition for the best sportsman of Bosnia and Herzegovina in 2009 in the competition organized by "Nezavisne novine", in cooperation with Radio-television of Bosnia and Herzegovina.

In addition to his results at international competitions, Miličević was the national champion of Bosnia and Herzegovina four times (2001, 2002, 2007 and 2009).
