= Zaire at the 1988 Summer Olympics =

- Flag of Zaire
- IOC code: ZAI
- NOC: Comité National Olympique Zaïrois

in Seoul
- Competitors: 15 in 3 sports
- Flag bearer: Dikanda Diba
- Medals: Gold 0 Silver 0 Bronze 0 Total 0

Summer Olympics appearances (overview)
- 1968; 1972–1980; 1984; 1988; 1992; 1996; 2000; 2004; 2008; 2012; 2016; 2020; 2024

Zaire (now called the Democratic Republic of the Congo) competed at the 1988 Summer Olympics in Seoul, South Korea.

== Competitors ==
The following is the list of number of competitors in the Games.

Sport	Men	Women	Total
Athletics	4	2	6
Boxing	5	–	5
Cycling	4	0	4
Total	13	2	15

== Athletics ==
Men
Track and road events

Athlete	Event	Heat Round 1		Heat Round 2		Semifinal		Final	
Athlete	Event	Time	Rank	Time	Rank	Time	Rank	Time	Rank
Mwana Bute Kasongo	400 metres	DQ		Did not advance					
Kazanga Makok	800 metres	DQ		Did not advance					
Kaleka Mutoke	5000 metres	14:56.33	49	—		Did not advance			
Kamana Koji	10,000 metres	DNF		—				Did not advance	
Kamana Koji	Marathon	—						2:38:34	73
Kaleka Mutoke	Marathon	—						2:55:21	89

Women
Track and road events

Athlete	Event	Heat Round 1		Heat Round 2		Semifinal		Final	
Athlete	Event	Time	Rank	Time	Rank	Time	Rank	Time	Rank
Christine Bakombo	400 metres	57.85	43	Did not advance					
Christine Bakombo	800 metres	2:11.00	28	—		Did not advance			
Dikanda Diba	3000 metres	10:32.88	31	—				Did not advance	

== Boxing ==
Athlete	Event	Round of 64	Round of 32	Round of 16	Quarterfinals	Semifinals	Final	
Athlete	Event	Opposition Result	Opposition Result	Opposition Result	Opposition Result	Opposition Result	Opposition Result	Rank
Ibibongo Nduita	Bantamweight	Ally (TAN); W 3–2	Matsushima (JPN); L 0–5	Did not advance				
Wabanko Banko	Light middleweight	Bye	Mercado (ECU); L 0–5	Did not advance				
Serge Kabongo	Middleweight	Bye	Iahuat (VAN); W RSC R1	Shah (PAK); L 0–5	Did not advance			
Rund Kanika	Light heavyweight	—	Imadiyi (NGR); L KO	Did not advance				
Tshibalabala Kadima	Super heavyweight	—	Schnieders (FRG); L RSC R2	Did not advance				

== Cycling ==
=== Road ===
Men

Athlete	Event	Time	Rank
Mobange Amisi	Road race	4:43:15	98
Kimpale Mosengo	Road race	4:45:20	104
Ndjibu N'Golomingi	Road race	DNF	
Mobange Amisi; Pasi Mbenza; Kimpale Mosengo; Ndjibu N'Golomingi	Team time trial	2:21:37.3	28
