= Adrián Solano =

Costa Rican cyclist

Personal information
- Born: 17 October 1951 (age 74) San José, Costa Rica

Cycling career
- Sport: Cycling

Adrián Solano (born 17 October 1951) is a Costa Rican former cyclist. He competed in the team time trial at the 1968 Summer Olympics where the Costa Rican team was placed 27th.
