= Marcel Grifnée =

Belgian cyclist

Personal information
- Born: 7 February 1947 (age 79) Liège, Belgium
- Died: 11/11/1990

Cycling career
- Sport: Cycling

Marcel Grifnée (born 7 February 1947) is a former Belgian cyclist. He competed in the team time trial at the 1968 Summer Olympics.
