= Zaina =

Zaina is an Arabic name which means beauty, adornment, joyful, good looking and happy. It can also be a surname but only in a non Islamic manner. Notable people with the surname include:

- Enrico Zaina (born 1967), Italian road bicycle racer
- Ionuț Zaina (born 1994), Romanian footballer

== See also ==
- Zaina (given name)
