= John Watson (cyclist) =

British cyclist (born 1947)

Personal information
- Born: 1 April 1947 (age 79) Yorkshire, England
- Height: 6 ft 1 in (185 cm)
- Weight: 78 kg (172 lb)

Cycling career
- Sport: Cycling

Professional team
- Clifton Cycling Club

John Watson (born 1 April 1947) is a former British cyclist. He competed in the team time trial at the 1968 Summer Olympics.
