= Stany Kempompo Ngangola =

DR Congo swimmer

Personal information
- Born: January 8, 1974 (age 52)

Sport
- Sport: Swimming

Stany Kempompo Ngangola (born 8 January 1974), is a swimmer and electrical engineer from the Democratic Republic of the Congo.

He represented his country at the 2008 Summer Olympics in Beijing. Due to a misprint in his personal best time, he was rumoured by the international media to be a potential successor to "Eric the Eel" – a spectacular underperformer. He was prematurely nicknamed "Stany the Snail", until he actually swam and the media conceded that he "wasn't too bad". Kempompo finished last in the 50 metre freestyle event, with a time of 35.19.

He was also nicknamed "Stany the Stingray" in the Danish, Argentinian, British, Canadian, New Zealand and Australian press.
