= Ndjakalenga Mwenentanda =

American basketball player (born 2003)

No. 15 – Los Angeles Sparks
- Position: Guard
- League: WNBA

Personal information
- Born: November 24, 2003 (age 22) Sioux Falls, South Dakota, U.S.
- Listed height: 6 ft 2 in (1.88 m)

Career information
- High school: Washington (Sioux Falls, South Dakota)
- College: Texas (2022–2025); Vanderbilt (2025–2026)
- WNBA draft: 2026: undrafted
- Playing career: 2026–present

Career history
- 2026: Golden State Valkyries
- 2026–present: Los Angeles Sparks
- Stats at Basketball Reference

Ndjakalenga Mwenentanda (born November 24, 2003) is an American professional basketball player for the Los Angeles Sparks of the Women's National Basketball Association (WNBA). She played college basketball for the Texas Longhorns and Vanderbilt Commodores.

== Early life ==
Mwenentanda was born on November 24, 2003, in Sioux Falls, South Dakota. She is the daughter of Muene Tshijuka, a basketball player for Congo at the 1996 Summer Olympics, and her name comes from the Luba people and means "a gift of luck". She grew up competing in track and basketball and became a standout basketball player at Washington High School in Sioux Falls. She led her team to a state title as a junior while averaging 14.8 points and 7.0 rebounds per game. As a senior, she was named the South Dakota Gatorade Player of the Year after averaging 18.7 points and 8.3 rebounds. Ranked one of the top 35 recruits nationally, Mwenentanda committed to play college basketball for the Texas Longhorns.

== College career ==
As a freshman at Texas in 2022–23, Mwenentanda appeared in 31 games, averaging 4.4 points and 2.2 rebounds. She then averaged 3.7 points and 1.7 rebounds while playing 35 games as a backup in 2023–24. She helped Texas reach the Final Four of the NCAA Tournament as a junior, averaging 5.5 points while starting 15 of 37 games. Afterwards, Mwenentanda entered the NCAA transfer portal and transferred to the Vanderbilt Commodores for her final season. With the Commodores, she posted averages of 6.9 points and 3.4 rebounds in her lone season there.

== Professional career ==
After going unselected in the 2026 WNBA draft, Mwenentanda signed with the Golden State Valkyries on a training camp contract, although she was released in preseason. She later signed a replacement contract with the team on May 8, 2026, and then made her WNBA debut in a win against the Seattle Storm. Mwenentanda was later released by the Valkyries.

On August 29, 2026, Mwenentanda signed a developmental contract with the Los Angeles Sparks.

On October 15, 2026 , she signed at ESBVA-LM in French basketball league 12

== Career statistics ==
Legend
GP	Games played	GS	Games started	MPG	Minutes per game	RPG	Rebounds per game
APG	Assists per game	SPG	Steals per game	BPG	Blocks per game	PPG	Points per game
TO	Turnovers per game	FG%	Field-goal percentage	3P%	3-point field-goal percentage	FT%	Free-throw percentage
**Bold**	Career best	°	League leader

=== WNBA ===
WNBA regular season statistics
Year	Team	GP	GS	MPG	FG%	3P%	FT%	RPG	APG	SPG	BPG	TO	PPG
2026	Golden State	**5**	0	2.6	.000	—	—	.4	.4	.0	.0	**.2**	.0
2026	Los Angeles	2	0	**16.0**	**.250**	**.333**	**.667**	**3.5**	**.5**	**.5**	.0	2.5	**4.5**
**Career**	1 year, 1 team	7	0	6.4	.222	.250	.667	1.3	.4	.1	.0	.9	1.3
