= Ilunga Mande Zatara =

Congolese distance runner (born 1983)

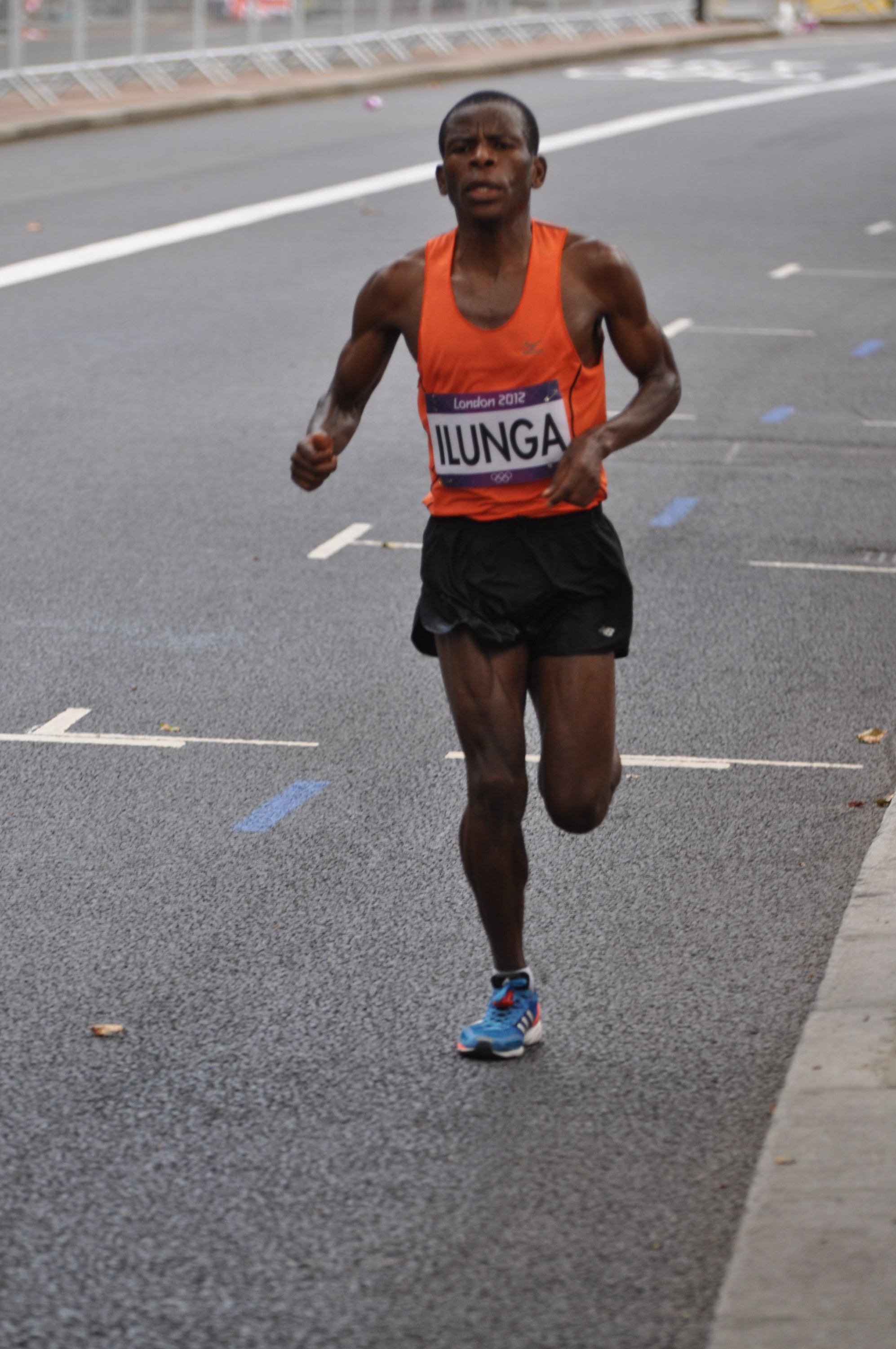
- Ilunga in the marathon at the 2012 Olympics in London

Personal information
- Born: March 12, 1983 (age 43)
- Height: 1.71 m (5 ft 7 1/2 in)
- Weight: 65 kg (143 lb)

Sport
- Country: Democratic Republic of the Congo
- Sport: Athletics
- Event: Marathon

Ilunga Mande Zatara (born 12 March 1983 in Kipushi, DR Congo) is a DR Congolese runner. He competed at the 2012 Summer Olympics in the marathon event and was flag bearer for the Democratic Republic of the Congo team at the opening ceremony. He did not finish the event.

Olympic Games
| Preceded by Franka Magali | Flagbearer for Democratic Republic of the Congo; London 2012 | Succeeded by Rosa Keleku |
