= Aleksandr Dokhlyakov =

Soviet cyclist

Personal information
- Born: 26 January 1942 (age 84) Tambov, Russian SFSR, Soviet Union

Cycling career
- Sport: Cycling

Aleksandr Dokhlyakov (born 26 January 1942) is a Soviet former cyclist. He competed in the team time trial at the 1968 Summer Olympics.
