= Democratic Republic of the Congo at the 2012 Summer Paralympics =

- Flag of the Democratic Republic of the Congo
- IPC code: COD
- NPC: Paralympic Committee of the Democratic Republic of the Congo

in London
- Competitors: 2 in 1 sport
- Flag bearer: Dedeline Mibamba Kimbata
- Medals: Gold 0 Silver 0 Bronze 0 Total 0

Summer Paralympics appearances (overview)
- 2012; 2016; 2020; 2024

The Democratic Republic of the Congo made its Paralympic Games début at the 2012 Summer Paralympics in London, United Kingdom, from August 29 to September 9.

== Athletics ==
Men’s field

Athlete	Event	Distance	Points	Rank
Levy Kitambala Kizito	Discus throw F57-58	27.23	265	16
Levy Kitambala Kizito	Javelin throw F57-58	18.37	138	16

Women’s track

Athlete	Event	Heat		Final	
Athlete	Event	Result	Rank	Result	Rank
Dedeline Mibamba Kimbata	100m T54	23.08	7	Did not advance	

Women’s field

Athlete	Event	Distance	Points	Rank
Dedeline Mibamba Kimbata	Discus throw F57-58	9.29	11	17

== See also ==
- Democratic Republic of the Congo at the Paralympics
- Democratic Republic of the Congo at the 2012 Summer Olympics
