= Kirichenko =

Kirichenko (Ukrainian: Кіріченко; Russian: Кириченко) is a gender-neutral Ukrainian surname.

People with the surname include:

- Aleksandr Kirichenko (born 1967), Ukrainian track cyclist
- Alexei Kirichenko (1908–1975), Soviet politician
- Dmitri Kirichenko (born 1977), Russian footballer and coach
- Evgenia Kirichenko (1931–2021), Ukrainian-Russian historian
- Irina Kirichenko (1937–2020), Soviet sprint cyclist
- Olga Kirichenko (born 1976), Ukrainian swimmer
- Serhiy Kirichenko (born 1952), Ukrainian military leader
- Vadim Kirichenko (born 1936), Soviet footballer and manager
- Yury Kirichenko (born 1991), Russian taekwondo athlete

== See also ==
- Kyrychenko
