= Democratic Republic of the Congo at the 2008 Summer Olympics =

- Flag of the Democratic Republic of the Congo
- IOC code: COD
- NOC: Comité Olympique Congolais

in Beijing
- Competitors: 5 in 4 sports
- Flag bearers: Franka Magali (opening); Eric Kibanza (closing)
- Medals: Gold 0 Silver 0 Bronze 0 Total 0

Summer Olympics appearances (overview)
- 1968; 1972–1980; 1984; 1988; 1992; 1996; 2000; 2004; 2008; 2012; 2016; 2020; 2024

The Democratic Republic of the Congo competed in the 2008 Summer Olympics which were held in Beijing, People's Republic of China from August 8 to August 24, 2008. The country's delegation consisted of 29 people, including coaches and sports officials. Athletes from the DRC competed in athletics, judo, boxing and swimming.

== Athletics ==
Men

Athlete	Event	Heat		Semifinal		Final	
Athlete	Event	Result	Rank	Result	Rank	Result	Rank
Gary Kikaya	400 m	44.89	4 q	44.94	5	Did not advance	

Women

Athlete	Event	Heat		Quarterfinal		Semifinal		Final	
Athlete	Event	Result	Rank	Result	Rank	Result	Rank	Result	Rank
Franka Magali	100 m	12.57	8	Did not advance					

Key

- Note–Ranks given for track events are within the athlete's heat only
- Q = Qualified for the next round
- q = Qualified for the next round as a fastest loser or, in field events, by position without achieving the qualifying target
- NR = National record
- N/A = Round not applicable for the event
- Bye = Athlete not required to compete in round

== Boxing ==
DR Congo qualified one boxer for the Olympic boxing tournament. Herry Saliku Biembe qualified in the middleweight class at the second African qualifying tournament.

Athlete	Event	Round of 32	Round of 16	Quarterfinals	Semifinals	Final	
Athlete	Event	Opposition Result	Opposition Result	Opposition Result	Opposition Result	Opposition Result	Rank
Herry Saliku Biembe	Middleweight	Gazis (GRE); L 2–7	Did not advance				

== Judo ==
Athlete	Event	Round of 32	Round of 16	Quarterfinals	Semifinals	Repechage 1	Repechage 2	Repechage 3	Final / BM	
Athlete	Event	Opposition Result	Opposition Result	Opposition Result	Opposition Result	Opposition Result	Opposition Result	Opposition Result	Opposition Result	Rank
Eric Kibanza	Men's −73 kg	Boqiev (TJK); L 0000–0210	Did not advance			Bilodid (UKR); L 0001–0011	Did not advance			

== Swimming ==
Men

Athlete	Event	Heat		Semifinal		Final	
Athlete	Event	Time	Rank	Time	Rank	Time	Rank
Stany Kempompo Ngangola	50 m freestyle	35.19	97	Did not advance			
