= Marta Rezoagli =

Italian basketball player (born 1973)

Marta Rezoagli (born 8 November 1973) is an Italian former basketball player who competed in the 1996 Summer Olympics.
