= Valentina Gardellin =

Italian basketball player (born 1970)

Personal information
- Nationality: Italian
- Born: 13 February 1970 (age 55); Mestre, Italy

Sport
- Sport: Basketball

Valentina Gardellin (born 13 February 1970) is an Italian basketball player. She competed in the women's tournament at the 1996 Summer Olympics.
