= Democratic Republic of the Congo at the 2020 Summer Olympics =

- Flag of the Democratic Republic of the Congo
- IOC code: COD
- NOC: Comité Olympique Congolais

in Tokyo, Japan July 23, 2021 – August 8, 2021
- Competitors: 7 in 4 sports
- Flag bearers (opening): Marcelat Sakobi Matshu; David Tshama
- Flag bearer (closing): N/A
- Medals: Gold 0 Silver 0 Bronze 0 Total 0

Summer Olympics appearances (overview)
- 1968; 1972–1980; 1984; 1988; 1992; 1996; 2000; 2004; 2008; 2012; 2016; 2020; 2024

The Democratic Republic of the Congo competed at the 2020 Summer Olympics in Tokyo. Originally scheduled to take place from 24 July to 9 August 2020, the Games were postponed to 23 July to 8 August 2021, because of the COVID-19 pandemic. It was the nation's eleventh consecutive appearance at the Summer Olympics, although it had previously competed in four editions under the name Zaire.

== Competitors ==
The following is the list of number of competitors in the Games.

Sport	Men	Women	Total
Athletics	1	0	1
Boxing	2	2	4
Judo	0	1	1
Taekwondo	0	1	1
Total	3	4	7

== Athletics ==
Democratic Republic of the Congo received a universality slot from the World Athletics to send a male athlete to the Olympics.

Key

- Note–Ranks given for track events are within the athlete's heat only
- Q = Qualified for the next round
- q = Qualified for the next round as a fastest loser or, in field events, by position without achieving the qualifying target
- NR = National record
- N/A = Round not applicable for the event
- Bye = Athlete not required to compete in round

Track & road events

Athlete	Event	Heat		Quarterfinal		Semifinal		Final	
Athlete	Event	Result	Rank	Result	Rank	Result	Rank	Result	Rank
Oliver Mwimba	Men's 100 m	10.63	3 Q	10.97	9	Did not advance			

== Boxing ==
The Democratic Republic of the Congo entered four boxers (two per gender) into the Olympic tournament for the first time since London 2012. David Tshama scored an outright semifinal victory to secure a spot in the men's middleweight division at the 2020 African Qualification Tournament in Diamniadio, Senegal.

Fiston Mbaya Mulumba (men's lightweight), Marcelat Sakobi Matshu (women's featherweight), and Naomie Yumba Therese (women's lightweight) completed the nation's boxing lineup by topping the list of eligible boxers from Africa in their respective weight divisions of the IOC's Boxing Task Force Rankings.

Athlete	Event	Round of 32	Round of 16	Quarterfinals	Semifinals	Final	
Athlete	Event	Opposition Result	Opposition Result	Opposition Result	Opposition Result	Opposition Result	Rank
Fiston Mbaya Mulumba	Men's lightweight	Narimatsu (JPN); L 0–5	Did not advance				
David Tshama	Men's middleweight	Ntsengue (CMR); W 3–2	Valsaint (HAI); L 1–4	Did not advance			
Marcelat Sakobi Matshu	Women's featherweight	Petecio (PHI); L 0–5	Did not advance				
Naomie Yumba	Women's lightweight	Bye	Kodirova (UZB); L 0–5	Did not advance			

== Judo ==
Democratic Republic of the Congo qualified one judoka for the women's half-heavyweight category (78 kg) at the Games. Marie Branser accepted a continental berth from Africa as the nation's top-ranked judoka outside of direct qualifying position in the IJF World Ranking List of June 28, 2021.

Athlete	Event	Round of 32	Round of 16	Quarterfinals	Semifinals	Repechage	Final / BM	
Athlete	Event	Opposition Result	Opposition Result	Opposition Result	Opposition Result	Opposition Result	Opposition Result	Rank
Marie Branser	Women's –78 kg	Babintseva (ROC); L 00–01	Did not advance					

== Taekwondo ==
Democratic Republic of the Congo received an invitation from the Tripartite Commission and the World Taekwondo Federation to send Naomie Katoka in the women's welterweight category (67 kg) to the Olympics.

Athlete	Event	Round of 16	Quarterfinals	Semifinals	Repechage	Final / BM	
Athlete	Event	Opposition Result	Opposition Result	Opposition Result	Opposition Result	Opposition Result	Rank
Naomie Katoka	Women's −67 kg	Gbagbi (CIV); L DSQ	Did not advance				
