= Mayumi Kawasaki (basketball) =

Japanese basketball player

Personal information
- Nationality: Japanese
- Born: 1 October 1972 (age 54) Tokyo, Japan

Sport
- Sport: Basketball

Mayumi Kawasaki (born 1 October 1972) is a Japanese basketball player. She competed in the women's tournament at the 1996 Summer Olympics.
