= Christine Gomis =

French basketball player

Medal record

Representing France

European Championships
Silver medal – second place	1999 Poland	Team

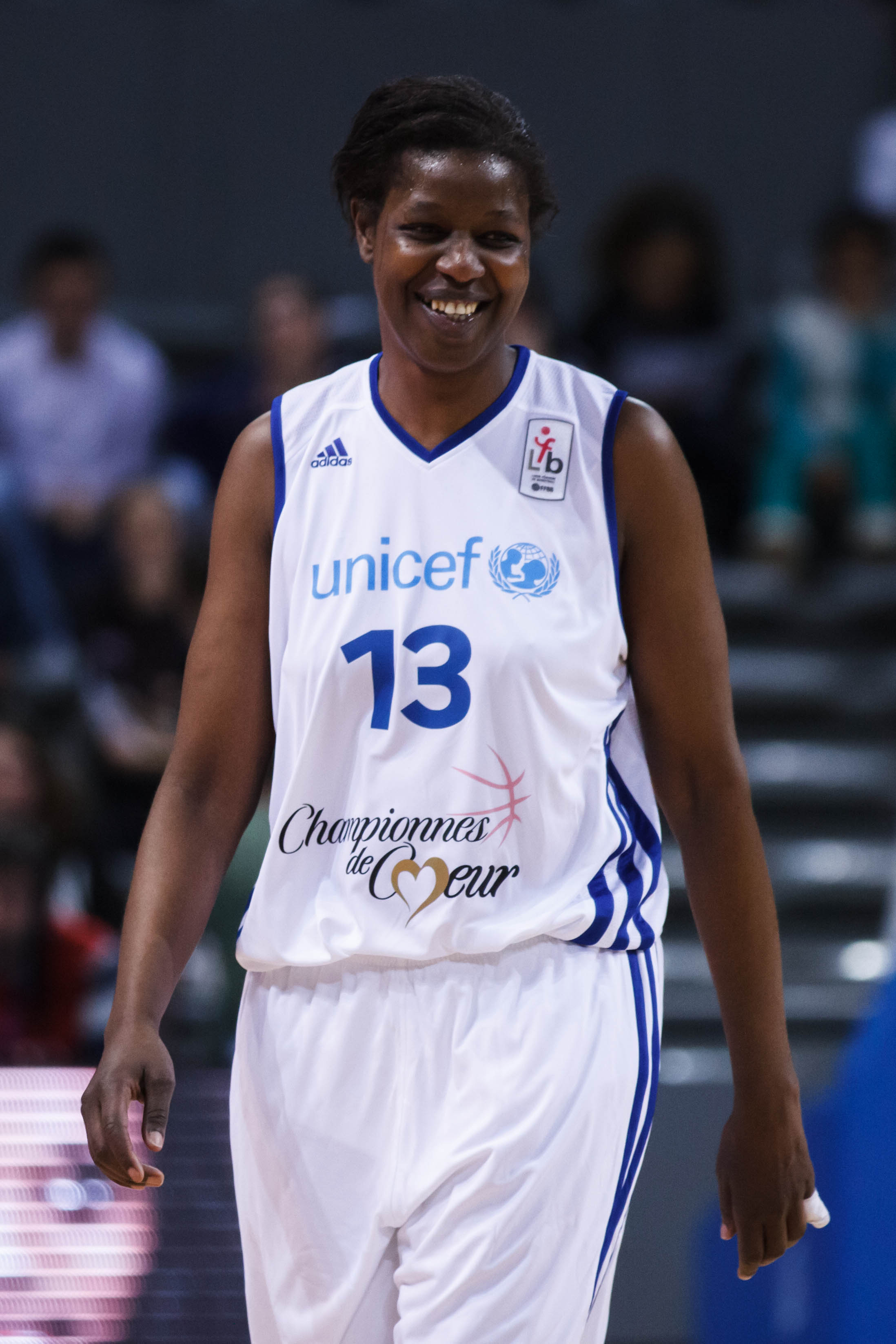
Christine Gomis.

Christine Gomis (born 3 February 1968 in Paris, France) is a French basketball player. Gomis has had 72 selections for the French national women's basketball team from 1991 to 1999.
