= Nataliya Silianova =

Ukrainian basketball player

Personal information
- Nationality: Ukrainian
- Born: 29 January 1971 (age 55) Dnipropetrovsk, Ukrainian SSR, Soviet Union

Sport
- Sport: Basketball
Medal record
Women's basketball
Representing Ukraine
European Championships
Gold medal – first place	1995 Czech Republic	Team competition

Nataliya Silianova (born 29 January 1971) is a Ukrainian basketball player. She competed in the women's tournament at the 1996 Summer Olympics.
