= Democratic Republic of the Congo at the 2015 World Championships in Athletics =

- WA code: COD

in Beijing
- Competitors: 1
- Medals: Gold 0 Silver 0 Bronze 0 Total 0

World Championships in Athletics appearances
- 1983; 1987; 1991; 1993; 1995; 1997; 1999; 2001; 2003; 2005; 2007; 2009; 2011; 2013; 2015; 2017; 2019; 2022; 2023

Democratic Republic of the Congo competed at the 2015 World Championships in Athletics in Beijing, China, from 22 to 30 August 2015.

== Men ==
Track and road events

Athlete	Event	Preliminary Round		Heat		Semifinal		Final	
Athlete	Event	Result	Rank	Result	Rank	Result	Rank	Result	Rank
Rossene Mpingo	100 metres	11.10 PB	15	Did not advance					
