= Shen Li =

Chinese basketball player

Personal information
- Nationality: Chinese
- Born: 14 May 1969 (age 55); Shanghai, China

Sport
- Sport: Basketball

Shen Li (Chinese: 沈力; pinyin: Shěn Lì, born 14 May 1969) is a Chinese basketball player. She competed in the women's tournament at the 1996 Summer Olympics.
