= Olena Oberemko =

Ukrainian basketball player

Personal information
- Nationality: Ukrainian
- Born: 26 August 1973 (age 52) Frunze, Kirghiz SSR, Soviet Union

Sport
- Sport: Basketball
Medal record
Women's basketball
Representing CIS
European Junior Championships
Gold medal – first place	1992 Greece	Team competition
Representing Ukraine
European Championships
Gold medal – first place	1995 Czech Republic	Team competition

Olena Oberemko (born 26 August 1973) is a Ukrainian basketball player. She competed in the women's tournament at the 1996 Summer Olympics.
