= Momo Babungu =

Congolese table tennis player

Personal information
- Nationality: Congolese
- Born: 12 April 1983 (age 41)

Sport
- Sport: Table tennis

Momo Babungu (born 12 April 1983) is a Congolese table tennis player. He competed in the men's singles event at the 2004 Summer Olympics.
