= Democratic Republic of the Congo at the 2016 Summer Olympics =

- Flag of the Democratic Republic of the Congo
- IOC code: COD
- NOC: Comité Olympique Congolais

in Rio de Janeiro
- Competitors: 4 in 3 sports
- Flag bearer: Rosa Keleku
- Medals: Gold 0 Silver 0 Bronze 0 Total 0

Summer Olympics appearances (overview)
- 1968; 1972–1980; 1984; 1988; 1992; 1996; 2000; 2004; 2008; 2012; 2016; 2020; 2024

The Democratic Republic of the Congo competed at the 2016 Summer Olympics in Rio de Janeiro, Brazil, from 5 to 21 August 2016. This was the nation's tenth appearance at the Summer Olympics since its debut in 1968, although it had previously competed in four editions under the name Zaire.

Four athletes from the Democratic Republic of the Congo, two per gender, were selected to the team across three different sports (athletics, judo, and taekwondo – the nation's sporting debut in Rio Janeiro) at the Games. Taekwondo fighter Rosa Keleku, the only qualified sportswoman in the team, served as the nation's flag bearer in the opening ceremony. The Democratic Republic of Congo, however, has yet to win its first Olympic medal.

== Athletics (track and field) ==
Congolese athletes have so far achieved qualifying standards in the following athletics events (up to a maximum of 3 athletes in each event):

Key

- Note–Ranks given for track events are within the athlete's heat only
- Q = Qualified for the next round
- q = Qualified for the next round as a fastest loser or, in field events, by position without achieving the qualifying target
- NR = National record
- N/A = Round not applicable for the event
- Bye = Athlete not required to compete in round

Track & road events

Athlete	Event	Heat		Final	
Athlete	Event	Result	Rank	Result	Rank
Makorobondo Salukombo	Men's marathon	—		2:28:54	113
Beatrice Alice	Women's 5000 m	19:29.47	16	did not advance	

== Judo ==
The Democratic Republic of the Congo has qualified one judoka for the men's half-lightweight category (66 kg) at the Games. Rodrick Kuku has received a spare continental quota spot freed up by South Africa from the African region as the nation's top-ranked judoka outside of direct qualifying position in the IJF World Ranking List of May 30, 2016.

Athlete	Event	Round of 64	Round of 32	Round of 16	Quarterfinals	Semifinals	Repechage	Final / BM	
Athlete	Event	Opposition Result	Opposition Result	Opposition Result	Opposition Result	Opposition Result	Opposition Result	Opposition Result	Rank
Rodrick Kuku	Men's −66 kg	Bye	Mateo (DOM); L 000–010	did not advance					

== Taekwondo ==
Democratic Republic of the Congo entered one athlete into the taekwondo competition for the first time at the Olympics. Rosa Keleku secured a spot in the women's flyweight category (49 kg) by virtue of her top two finish at the 2016 African Qualification Tournament in Agadir, Morocco.

Athlete	Event	Round of 16	Quarterfinals	Semifinals	Repechage	Final / BM	
Athlete	Event	Opposition Result	Opposition Result	Opposition Result	Opposition Result	Opposition Result	Rank
Rosa Keleku	Women's −49 kg	Manjarrez (MEX); L 5–9	did not advance				
