= Halima Soussi =

French basketball player

Halima Soussi (born 29 August 1965 in Antibes, France) is a French basketball player. Soussi has had 211 selections on the French national women's basketball team from 1983 to 1996.
