= Milena Rázgová =

Slovak basketball player

Personal information
- Nationality: Slovak
- Born: 2 November 1969 (age 55); Ružomberok, Czechoslovakia

Sport
- Sport: Basketball

Milena Rázgová (born 2 November 1969) is a Slovak basketball player. She competed in the women's tournament at the 1992 Summer Olympics.
