= Gertrudis Gómez =

Cuban basketball player

Gertrudis Gómez (born 4 February 1970) is a Cuban former basketball player who competed in the 1996 Summer Olympics.
