= Dedeline Mibamba Kimbata =

Congolese Paralympic athlete

Dedeline Mibamba Kimbata (born 5 February 1982) is a Congolese Paralympic track and field athlete.

== Personal life ==
Kimbata was born on 5 February 1982. She was born to a poor family living in Kinshasa, the capital and the largest city of the Democratic Republic of the Congo (DRC).

At the age of 18 she stepped on a landmine whilst crossing the border between the DRC and Angola. As a result, she lost her legs and had to stay in hospital for two years before being provided with prosthetic limbs by the Red Cross.

During her stay in London for the Paralympics she applied for political asylum, since she feared prosecution in the DRC because of her protest against president Joseph Kabila.

== Athletics ==
Kimbata had played basketball as a teenager and in 2011 decided to take up sport again. With the assistance of religious charities she began wheelchair racing at the Acoshi athletics club. She raced in her everyday wheelchair and despite her government providing funds to sports officials to buy her a racing chair it never arrived. She competes in the T54 Paralympic classification.

The International Paralympic Committee gave Kimbata a wildcard to allow her to compete at the 2012 Summer Paralympics held in London, United Kingdom, where alongside Levy Kitambala Kizito she made up the DRC's first ever Paralympic team. She came to her training camp at the University of Bedfordshire without a racing wheelchair but had one donated to her by Kenyan Paralympian Anne Wafula Strike after the two were put in contact by The Dream, a charity campaign run by organisations in Britain and Haiti.

At the Paralympics Kimbata carried the DRC flag during the Parade of Nations at the opening ceremony. She initially planned to compete in the F57–58 discus and the 1500 metres, but changed to competing in the discus and the T54 100 metres. Her discus event took place on 4 September and the 100 m event on 8 September, both in the Olympic Stadium in the Olympic Park, London. She finished seventeenth in the discus with a throw of 9.29 metres. In the 100 metres she finished seventh in her heat, in a season's best time of 23.08 seconds, but failed to qualify for the final.
