= Democratic Republic of the Congo at the 2024 Summer Olympics =

- Flag of the Democratic Republic of the Congo
- IOC code: COD
- NOC: Comité Olympique Congolais

in Paris, France 26 July 2024 – 11 August 2024
- Competitors: 6 (3 men and 3 women) in 4 sports
- Flag bearers (opening): Dominique Lasconi Mulamba & Brigitte Mbabi
- Flag bearer (closing): Brigitte Mbabi
- Medals: Gold 0 Silver 0 Bronze 0 Total 0

Summer Olympics appearances (overview)
- 1968; 1972–1980; 1984; 1988; 1992; 1996; 2000; 2004; 2008; 2012; 2016; 2020; 2024

The Democratic Republic of the Congo competed at the 2024 Summer Olympics in Paris from 26 July to 11 August 2024. It was the nation's twelfth consecutive appearance at the Summer Olympics since the nation's official debut at the 1968 Summer Olympics under the name of Congo-Kinshasa, and it had previously competed in four editions under the name Zaire, 16 years after the nation's official debut.

== Competitors ==
The following is the list of number of competitors in the Games.

Sport	Men	Women	Total
Athletics	1	0	1
Boxing	0	2	2
Judo	1	0	1
Swimming	1	1	2
Total	3	3	6

== Athletics ==
DR Congo sent one sprinter to compete at the 2024 Summer Olympics.

Key

- Note–Ranks given for track events are within the athlete's heat only
- Q = Qualified for the next round
- q = Qualified for the next round as a fastest loser or, in field events, by position without achieving the qualifying target
- NR = National record
- N/A = Round not applicable for the event
- Bye = Athlete not required to compete in round

Track events

Athlete	Event	Preliminary		Heat		Semifinal		Final	
Athlete	Event	Result	Rank	Result	Rank	Result	Rank	Result	Rank
Dominique Mulamba	Men's 100 m	10.54	3 q	10.53 SB	7	Did not advance			

== Boxing ==
The Democratic Republic of the Congo entered two boxers into the Olympic tournament. Marcelat Sakobi Matshu (women's featherweight) secured a spots in her division by advancing to the final match, and obtained one of two available slots, at the 2023 African Olympic Qualification Tournament in Dakar, Senegal. Brigitte Mbabi (women's welterweight) secured her spots following the triumph in quota bouts round, at the 2024 World Olympic Qualification Tournament 2 in Bangkok, Thailand.

Athlete	Event	Round of 32	Round of 16	Quarterfinals	Semifinals	Final	
Athlete	Event	Opposition Result	Opposition Result	Opposition Result	Opposition Result	Opposition Result	Rank
Marcelat Sakobi Matshu	Women's 57 kg	Turdibekova (UZB); L 2–3	Did not advance				
Brigitte Mbabi	Women's 66 kg	Bye	Suwannapheng (THA); L 1–4	Did not advance			

== Judo ==
The Democratic Republic of Congo qualified one judoka for the following weight class at the Games. Arnold Kisoka (men's extra-lightweight, 60 kg) got qualified via continental quota based on Olympic point rankings.

Athlete	Event	Round of 32	Round of 16	Quarterfinals	Semifinals	Repechage	Final / BM	
Athlete	Event	Opposition Result	Opposition Result	Opposition Result	Opposition Result	Opposition Result	Opposition Result	Rank
Arnold Kisoka	Men's –60 kg	Wolczak (ISR); L 00–10	Did not advance					

== Swimming ==
For the first time since 2008, DR Congo sent two swimmers to compete at the 2024 Paris Olympics.

Athlete	Event	Heat		Semifinal		Final	
Athlete	Event	Time	Rank	Time	Rank	Time	Rank
Aristote Ndombe Impelenga	Men's 50 m freestyle	29.04	70	Did not advance			
Divine Miansadi Mpolo	Women's 50 m freestyle	44.10	79	Did not advance			

Qualifiers for the latter rounds (Q) of all events were decided on a time only basis, therefore positions shown are overall results versus competitors in all heats.
