= John Bettinson =

British cyclist

Personal information
- Born: 10 December 1940 (age 85) Barrow-in-Furness, England
- Height: 6 ft 1 in (185 cm)
- Weight: 73 kg (161 lb)

Cycling career
- Sport: Cycling

John Bettinson (born 10 December 1940) is a former British cyclist. He competed in the team time trial at the 1968 Summer Olympics.
