= Nataliya Svinukhova =

Russian basketball player

Nataliya Svinukhova (born 20 May 1972) is a Russian former basketball player who competed in the 1996 Summer Olympics.
