= Kim Jung-min (basketball) =

South Korean basketball player

Personal information
- Nationality: South Korean
- Born: 13 February 1972 (age 53) Gyeongsangbuk, South Korea

Sport
- Sport: Basketball

Kim Jung-min (born 13 February 1972) is a South Korean basketball player. She competed in the women's tournament at the 1996 Summer Olympics.
