= An Sun-mi =

South Korean basketball player

Personal information
- Nationality: South Korean
- Born: 2 August 1972 (age 52); Gyeonggi Province, South Korea

Sport
- Sport: Basketball

An Sun-mi (born 2 August 1972) is a South Korean basketball player. She competed in the women's tournament at the 1996 Summer Olympics.
