= Khalid Al-Harbi =

Saudi Arabian table tennis player (born 1975)

Personal information
- Nationality: Saudi Arabia
- Born: 10 July 1975 (age 50)
- Height: 1.75 m (5 ft 9 in)
- Weight: 73 kg (161 lb)

Sport
- Sport: Table tennis

Khalid Al-Harbi (Arabic: خالد الحربي; born 10 July 1975) is a Saudi Arabian table tennis player. He competed in the 2004 Summer Olympics.

Al-Harbi was eliminated from the Athens Games in table tennis after losing to Serbian player Aleksandar Karakašević in four straight sets.

During the 2011 Arab Games held in Doha, Qatar, Al-Harbi was part of the Saudi table tennis team that lost the final match to the Egyptian team.
