= Willy Kalombo Mwenze =

DR Congolese long-distance runner (born 1970)

Willy Kalombo Mwenze (born 7 June 1970) is a retired long-distance runner from the Democratic Republic of the Congo who specialized in the marathon. He attended three Olympic Games (1992, 1996, 2000).

He finished fourteenth at the 1997 World Championships and 49th at the 1999 World Championships. He also won a silver medal at the 1996 African Marathon Championships. His personal best time was 2:08:40 hours, achieved in April 1999 in Paris. This is the current national record.

== Achievements ==
- All results regarding marathon, unless stated otherwise

Year	Competition	Venue	Position	Notes
Representing Zaire
1992	Olympic Games	Barcelona, Spain	–	5000 metres DNS
1992	Olympic Games	Barcelona, Spain	50th	2:23:47
1996	Olympic Games	Atlanta, United States	16th	2:17:01
Representing Democratic Republic of the Congo
1997	World Championships	Athens, Greece	14th	2:19:18
1999	World Championships	Seville, Spain	49th	2:31:55
2000	Olympic Games	Sydney, Australia	—	DNF
2003	World Championships	Paris, France	—	DNS

Olympic Games
Preceded by Lukengu Ngalula	Flagbearer for Democratic Republic of the Congo; Sydney 2000	Succeeded by Gary Kikaya
