= Novella Schiesaro =

Italian basketball player (born 1973)

Novella Schiesaro (born 25 July 1973) is an Italian former basketball player who competed in the 1996 Summer Olympics.
