= Viktoriya Leleka =

Ukrainian basketball player (born 1973)

Personal information
- Nationality: Ukrainian
- Born: 7 March 1973 (age 52) Dnipropetrovsk, Ukrainian SSR, Soviet Union

Sport
- Sport: Basketball

Viktoriya Leleka (born 7 March 1973) is a Ukrainian basketball player. She competed in the women's tournament at the 1996 Summer Olympics.
