= Viktoriya Paradiz =

Ukrainian basketball player

Personal information
- Nationality: Ukrainian
- Born: 22 June 1968 (age 56); Dnipropetrovsk, Ukrainian SSR, Soviet Union

Sport
- Sport: Basketball

Viktoriya Paradiz (born 22 June 1968) is a Ukrainian basketball player. She competed in the women's tournament at the 1996 Summer Olympics.
