= O Il =

North Korean table tennis player

Personal information
- Nationality: North Korean
- Born: 1 January 1978 (age 48)

Sport
- Sport: Table tennis

O Il (born 1 January 1978) is a North Korean table tennis player. He competed in the men's singles event at the 2004 Summer Olympics.
