= Leone Patterson =

New Zealand basketball player

Leone Patterson (born 11 December 1962) is a New Zealand former basketball player who competed in the 2000 Summer Olympics. Patterson also competed for New Zealand at the 1994 World Championship held in Australia.

Leone was a star centre for Chapman University in Orange, California during the mid-1990s.
