= Muene Tshijuka =

Congolese basketball player

Personal information
- Nationality: Congolese
- Born: 12 May 1973 (age 53) Lubumbashi, Zaire

Sport
- Sport: Basketball

Muene "Mamissa" Tshijuka (born 12 May 1973) is a Congolese basketball player. She competed in the women's tournament at the 1996 Summer Olympics. The third of four children, she grew up playing handball in school until a coach recommended she try basketball. She committed to play college basketball for Old Dominion in 1998, transferring to Nebraska–Kearney in 2000.

Her daughter, Ndjakalenga Mwenentanda, committed to play college basketball for the Texas Longhorns.
