= Ruslana Kyrychenko =

Ukrainian basketball player

Personal information
- Nationality: Soviet; Ukrainian
- Born: 22 February 1975 (age 51) Bila Tserkva, Ukrainian SSR, Soviet Union

Sport
- Sport: Basketball
Medal record
Women's basketball
Representing the Soviet Union
European Cadettes Championships
Gold medal – first place	1991 Portugal	Team competition
Representing Ukraine
European Championships
Gold medal – first place	1995 Czech Republic	Team competition

Ruslana Kyrychenko (born 22 February 1975) is a Soviet and Ukrainian basketball player. She competed in the women's tournament at the 1996 Summer Olympics.
