= José Luyindula =

Congolese table tennis player

Personal information
- Nationality: Congolese
- Born: 18 November 1986 (age 38)

Sport
- Sport: Table tennis

José Luyindula (born 18 November 1986) is a Congolese table tennis player. He competed in the men's singles event at the 2004 Summer Olympics.
