= Han Hyun-sun =

South Korean basketball player

Personal information
- Nationality: South Korean
- Born: 24 July 1973 (age 51); Jeollabuk, South Korea

Sport
- Sport: Basketball

Han Hyun-sun (born 24 July 1973) is a South Korean basketball player. She competed in the women's tournament at the 1996 Summer Olympics.
