= Stefania Zanussi =

Italian basketball player (born 1965)

Personal information
- Nationality: Italian
- Born: 6 November 1965 (age 59); Codroipo, Italy

Sport
- Sport: Basketball

Stefania Zanussi (born 6 November 1965) is an Italian basketball player. She competed in the women's tournament at the 1996 Summer Olympics.
