= Kongolo Amba =

Congolese basketball player

Personal information
- Nationality: Congolese
- Born: 24 June 1973 (age 51); Kinshasa, Zaire

Sport
- Sport: Basketball

Kongolo Amba (born 24 June 1973) is a Congolese basketball player. She competed in the women's tournament at the 1996 Summer Olympics.
