= Samuel Kibamba =

Congolese cyclist

Personal information
- Born: 15 December 1949 (age 76) Leopoldville, Belgian Congo

Cycling career
- Sport: Cycling

Samuel Kibamba (born 15 December 1949) is a former Congolese cyclist. He competed in the individual road race and the team time trial events at the 1968 Summer Olympics.
