= Camille Thompson =

Canadian basketball player

Personal information
- Nationality: Canadian
- Born: 13 August 1971 (age 54); Salmon Arm, British Columbia, Canada

Sport
- Sport: Basketball

Camille Thompson (born 13 August 1971) is a Canadian basketball player. She competed in the women's tournament at the 1996 Summer Olympics.

== Awards and honors ==
- Top 100 U Sports women's basketball Players of the Century (1920–2020).
