= Lileko Bonzali =

Congolese basketball player

Personal information
- Nationality: Congolese
- Born: 4 February 1969 (age 56) Montreal, Quebec, Canada

Sport
- Sport: Basketball

Lileko Bonzali (born 4 February 1969) is a Congolese basketball player. She competed in the women's tournament at the 1996 Summer Olympics.
