= François Ombanzi =

Congolese cyclist

Personal information
- Born: 1 April 1947 (age 79) Leopoldville, Belgian Congo
- Height: 5 ft 10 in (178 cm)
- Weight: 75 kg (165 lb)

Cycling career
- Sport: Cycling

François Ombanzi (born 1 April 1947) is a former Congolese cyclist. He competed in the team time trial at the 1968 Summer Olympics.
