= Kakengwa Pikinini =

Congolese basketball player

Personal information
- Nationality: Congolese
- Born: 29 June 1971 (age 53); Bukavu, Zaire

Sport
- Sport: Basketball

Kakengwa Pikinini (born 29 June 1971) is a Congolese basketball player. She competed in the women's tournament at the 1996 Summer Olympics.
