= Rosette Luyina Kiese =

Congolese athlete (born 1989)

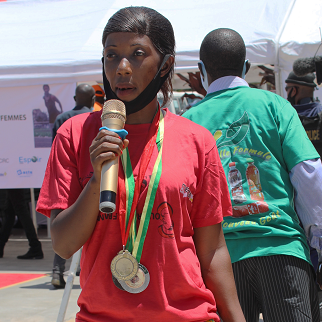
- in April 2021 (with facemask)

Personal information
- National team: Democratic Republic of the Congo
- Born: 3 December 1989 (age 36) Goma, Democratic Republic of the Congo

Sport
- Sport: Shot put
- Disability: Partial right led amputation

Rosette Luyina Kiese (born 3 December 1989) is a Congolese athlete who competes in the shot put. After having a partial amputation of her right leg due to a landmine explosion, Luyina took up sport and competed at the 2016 Summer Paralympics in Rio de Janeiro, Brazil.

== Career ==
Rosette Luyina Kiese had a partial amputation of her right leg in 2010 after stepping on a landmine in the Rutshuru Territory of the Democratic Republic of Congo. She underwent rehabilitation in the care of the International Committee of the Red Cross (ICRC), who also gave her a prosthesis. Luyina was introduced to sport, which she credited for helping her get on with her life.

Luyina was named to the Democratic Republic the Congo team for the 2016 Summer Paralympics in Rio de Janeiro, Brazil. The ICRC also aided with a grant to help the athletes attend the competition. Coached by Claude Weshanga, Luyina trained prior to the Paralympics at the Stade des Martyrs in Kinshasa. She was named as the flag bearer for her nation in the Parade of Nations during the 2016 Summer Paralympics opening ceremony. She competed in the women's shot put in the F57 class. Luyina finished in 10th position out of the 12 athletes, registering a distance of 4.97 metres (196 in).
