= Constantin Kabemba =

Congolese cyclist

Personal information
- Born: 1 June 1943 (age 83) Élisabethville, Belgian Congo

Cycling career
- Sport: Cycling

Constantin Kabemba (born 1 June 1943) is a former Congolese cyclist. He competed in the individual road race and the team time trial events at the 1968 Summer Olympics.
