= Kwun Eun-jeong =

South Korean basketball player

Personal information
- Nationality: South Korean
- Born: 18 August 1974 (age 50); Suwon, South Korea

Sport
- Sport: Basketball

Kwun Eun-jeong (born 18 August 1974) is a South Korean basketball player. She competed in the women's tournament at the 1996 Summer Olympics.
