= Elena Paparazzo =

Italian basketball player (born 1973)

Elena Paparazzo (born 11 May 1973) is an Italian former basketball player who competed in the 1992 Summer Olympics and in the 1996 Summer Olympics.
