= Susanna Bonfiglio =

Italian basketball player (born 1974)

Personal information
- Born: September 15, 1976 (age 50) Savona, Italy
- Listed height: 173 cm (5 ft 8 in)
- Position: Guard

Career history
- 2002: Phoenix Mercury
- Stats at Basketball Reference

Susanna Bonfiglio (born 8 September 1974) is an Italian former basketball player who competed in the 1996 Summer Olympics. She also played for the Phoenix Mercury of the Women's National Basketball Association (WNBA).

== Career statistics ==
Legend
GP	Games played	GS	Games started	MPG	Minutes per game	RPG	Rebounds per game
APG	Assists per game	SPG	Steals per game	BPG	Blocks per game	PPG	Points per game
TO	Turnovers per game	FG%	Field-goal percentage	3P%	3-point field-goal percentage	FT%	Free-throw percentage
**Bold**	Career best	°	League leader

=== WNBA ===
WNBA regular season statistics
Year	Team	GP	GS	MPG	FG%	3P%	FT%	RPG	APG	SPG	BPG	TO	PPG
2002	Phoenix	22	6	13.9	.483	.000	.760	1.7	1.0	0.5	0.0	0.8	4.8
**Career**	1 year, 1 team	22	6	13.9	.483	.000	.760	1.7	1.0	0.5	0.0	0.8	4.8
