= Zaire at the 1984 Summer Olympics =

- Flag of Zaire
- IOC code: ZAI
- NOC: Comité National Olympique Zaïrois

in Los Angeles, United States 28 July–12 August 1984
- Competitors: 8 in 2 sports
- Flag bearer: Christine Bakombo
- Medals: Gold 0 Silver 0 Bronze 0 Total 0

Summer Olympics appearances (overview)
- 1968; 1972–1980; 1984; 1988; 1992; 1996; 2000; 2004; 2008; 2012; 2016; 2020; 2024

Zaire (now called the Democratic Republic of the Congo) competed at the 1984 Summer Olympics in Los Angeles, United States. It had been 16 years since the previous time that the nation was represented at the Olympic Games as Congo-Kinshasa.

== Results by event ==
=== Athletics ===
Men's 5,000 metres

- Masini Situ-Kumbanga

- Heat — 15:02.52 (→ did not advance)

Men's Marathon

- Masini Situ-Kumbanga — did not finish (→ no ranking)

=== Boxing ===
Men's Flyweight (– 51 kg)

- Lutuma Diabateza

- First Round — Lost to José Rodríguez (PUR), 0:5

Men's Bantamweight (– 54 kg)

- Tshoza Mukuta

- First Round — Bye
- Second Round — Lost to Pedro Ruben Decima (ARG), 0:5

Men's Lightweight (– 60 kg)

- André Kimbu Mboma

- First Round — Bye
- Second Round — Lost to Gordon Carew (GUY), 0:5

Men's Light Welterweight (– 63.5 kg)

- Muenge Kafuanka

- First Round — Lost to Jorge Maysonet (PUR), RSC-1

Men's Welterweight (– 67 kg)

- Kitenge Kitangawa

- First Round — Bye
- Second Round — Defeated Lefa Tsapi (LES), RSC-1
- Third Round — Lost to Dwight Frazier (JAM), 2:3

Men's Light Middleweight (– 71 kg)

- Fubulume Inyama

- First Round — Bye
- Second Round — Lost to Elone Lutui (TNG), 1:4
