= Zaina Kapepula =

Congolese basketball player

Personal information
- Nationality: Congolese
- Born: 14 August 1975 (age 49); Lubumbashi, Zaire

Sport
- Sport: Basketball

Zaina Kapepula (born 14 August 1975) is a Congolese basketball player. She competed in the women's tournament at the 1996 Summer Olympics.
