= Gary Kikaya =

Congolese sprinter (born 1980)

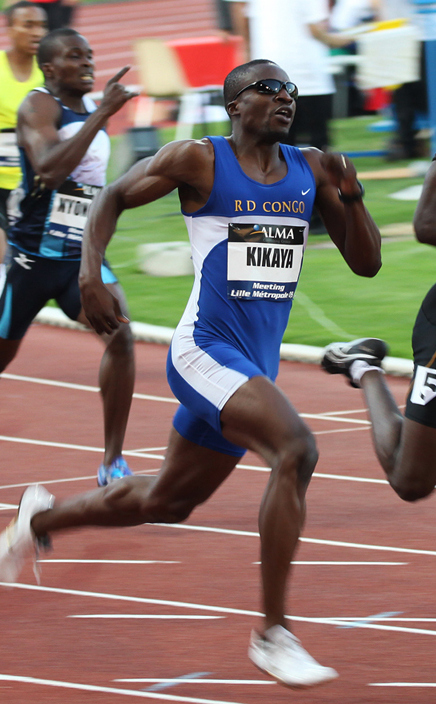
- Kikaya in 2009

Personal information
- Nationality: Congolese
- Born: 4 February 1980 (age 46) Kinshasa, Congo
- Height: 184 cm (6 ft 0 in)
- Weight: 75 kg (165 lb)

Sport
- Country: Democratic Republic of the Congo
- Sport: Athletics
- Event: 400 m
- Club: Tennessee Volunteers, Knoxville

Achievements and titles
- Personal best: 44.10 (2006)
Medal record
Representing the Democratic Republic of the Congo
African Championships
Gold medal – first place	2006 Bambous	400 m
Bronze medal – third place	2010 Nairobi	400 m

Gary Senga Kikaya (born 4 February 1980) is a retired sprinter from the Democratic Republic of the Congo. He competed in the 400 m event at the 2004 and 2008 Olympics but failed to reach the finals.

== Education ==
Kikaya is the son of Kikaya bin Karubi, a former Information Minister of the Congo, and a former Special Assistant to President Joseph Kabila. At the age of 12 his family moved to Johannesburg, South Africa, where his father served as the Congolese Ambassador to South Africa. Like most Southern African youths, his sporting interests began with rugby and soccer. He attended Queens High School in Johannesburg where he only turned to athletics as a senior in 1999 after watching the World Cup, in Johannesburg, the year before. He achieved the school's highest accolade in the form of a School Honours Blazer. He received a scholarship to study at Rand Afrikaans University (RAU), now the University of Johannesburg (UJ), was thereafter recruited by the University of Tennessee. Kikaya graduated in sociology at the University of Tennessee in Knoxville, Tennessee.

== Achievements ==
- 2002 NCAA champion indoor and outdoor in 400 meters
- 2003 NCAA champion indoor in 400 meters
- 2004 IAAF World Indoor Championships – bronze medal
- 2006 Africa Athletics Championship – gold medal
- Kikaya became the fastest non American athlete of all time (11th fastest man over 400m at the time, now joint 34th), running a new African record of 44.10 seconds to come second to Jeremy Wariner at the World Athletics Final 2006 in Stuttgart.

Olympic Games
Preceded by Willy Kalombo Mwenze	Flagbearer for Democratic Republic of the Congo; Athens 2004	Succeeded by Franka Magali
