= Lukengu Ngalula =

Congolese basketball player (born 1971)

Ngalula Lukengu
Personal information
- Nationality: Congolese
- Born: 11 August 1976 (age 49) Lubumbashi, Zaire

Sport
- Sport: Basketball

Ngalula Anastasia Lukengu (born 11 August 1976) is a former Congolese basketball player. She competed in the women's tournament at the 1996 Summer Olympics.
