= Congolese Olympic Committee =

National Olympic Committee

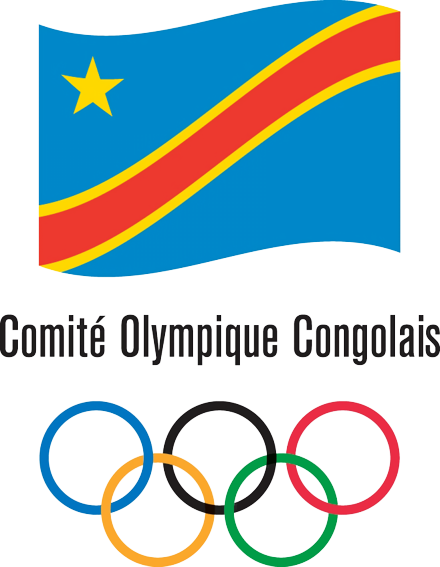
- Country: Democratic Republic of Congo
- Code: COD
- Recognized: 1968
- Continental Association: ANOCA
- Headquarters: Kinshasa, Democratic Republic of Congo
- President: Marcel Amos Mbayo Kitenge
- Secretary General: Honoré Mazombo Aenge

The Congolese Olympic Committee (French: Comité Olympique Congolais) (IOC code: COD) is the National Olympic Committee representing Democratic Republic of Congo.
