= Flag of the Democratic Republic of the Congo =

Democratic Republic of the Congo
- Use: National flag and ensign
- Proportion: 3:4
- Adopted: 18 February 2006; 20 years ago
- Design: A sky blue field with a yellow five-pointed star in the canton and a yellow-fimbriated red diagonal band from the lower hoist-side to the upper fly-side
- Presidential Standard
- Use: Presidential Standard
- Proportion: 3:4
- Design: National flag with the addition of the inscription "LE PRESIDENT"

The national flag of the Democratic Republic of the Congo is a sky blue flag, adorned with a yellow star in the upper left canton and cut diagonally by a red stripe with a yellow fimbriation. It was adopted on 18 February 2006. A new constitution, ratified in December 2005 and which came into effect in February 2006, promoted a return to a flag similar to that flown between 1966 and 1971, with a change from a royal blue to sky blue background. Blue represents peace. Red stands for "the blood of the country's martyrs", yellow the country's wealth; and the star symbolises the future.

During the period between 1971 and 1997 as Zaire, the flag consisted of a light green fabric with a yellow circle containing an arm holding a flaming torch.

It is one of the few national flags incorporating a diagonal line, with other examples including Tanzania, Namibia, Trinidad and Tobago, Saint Kitts and Nevis, and Brunei.

== Colours ==
The colours approximation is listed below:

Colour scheme	Blue	Red	Yellow
RGB	0-127-255	206-16-33	247-214-24
Hexadecimal	#007fff	#ce1021	#f7d618
CMYK	77, 51, 0, 0	0, 92, 84, 19	0, 13, 90, 3
Pantone (approximate)	299 C	186 C	107 C

== Historical flags ==
The flag immediately before the current one was adopted in 1997. It was similar to the flag used between 1960 and 1963. That flag, in turn, was based on the flag which was originally used by King Leopold's Association Internationale Africaine and was first used in 1877. The 1877 design featured a yellow star on a blue background. The 1877 flag continued as the flag of the Congo Free State after the territory was recognized as an official possession of Leopold II at the Berlin Conference.

After gaining independence from Belgium on 30 June 1960, the same basic design was maintained. However, six smaller stars were added to the hoist to symbolise the country's six provinces at the time. This design was used only from 1960 to 1963. A new flag was adopted in 1963 which consisted of the same yellow star, now made smaller, situated in the top corner of the hoist side, with a red, yellow-lined band running diagonally across the center.

After the gradual rise to power of Joseph-Désiré Mobutu, the flag was slightly modified in 1966. It was fundamentally changed in 1971 as part of the constitutional changes which created Zaire. The Zairean flag used Pan-African colours and it featured a light green flag emblazoned with a yellow circle containing an arm holding a red torch which symbolised the spirit of revolution and the lives of dead revolutionaries. That flag had a central emblem which is that of the Popular Movement of the Revolution (MPR). The new flag was created as part of Mobutu's attempted re-Africanization of the nation and was used officially until Mobutu's overthrow in the First Congo War. The flag of Zaire was also used as the political-party flag of the Popular Movement of the Revolution, led by Mobutu. This flag was adopted by the New Zaire government in exile formed in 2017 and was used during a failed coup attempt in May 2024.

After the fall of the Mobutu regime, a new flag was adopted in 1997 which was closely modelled on the original post-independent flag. It was modified in 2006 to its current design.

Flag of the International African Association
(1877–1885)
Congo Free State
(1885–1908)
Belgian Congo
(1908–1960)

Flag of the First Congolese Republic,
used 1960–1963

Flag of the First Congolese Republic,
used 1963–1966

Flag of the Second Congolese Republic,
used 1966–1971

Flag of Zaire
(1971–1997)

Flag of the Third Congolese Republic,
used 1997–2006

== See also ==
- Emblem of the Democratic Republic of the Congo
- List of flags of the Democratic Republic of the Congo
