= 2005 World Table Tennis Championships – Men's singles =

Men's singles at the 2005 World Table Tennis Championships
- Venue: Shanghai Grand Stage
- Location: Shanghai, China
- Dates: 29 April – 6 May
- Final score: 11–9, 3–11, 8–11, 11–9,11–9, 11–7

Medalists
gold medal	Wang Liqin	China
silver medal	Ma Lin	China
bronze medal	Oh Sang-eun	South Korea
bronze medal	Michael Maze	Denmark

== Seeds ==
1. (China) Wang Liqin (champion)
2. (China) Ma Lin (final)
3. (China) Wang Hao (fourth round)
4. (Belarus) Vladimir Samsonov (fourth round)
5. (Germany) Timo Boll (fourth round)
6. (South Korea) Ryu Seung-min (second round)
7. (China) Chen Qi (quarterfinals)
8. (Chinese Taipei) Chuang Chih-yuan (second round)
9. (Austria) Werner Schlager (second round)
10. (Greece) Kalinikos Kreanga (fourth round)
11. (Belgium) Jean-Michel Saive (second round)
12. (China) Kong Linghui (fourth round)
13. (Romania) Adrian Crișan (second round)
14. (Austria) Chen Weixing (second round)
15. (Russia) Alexey Smirnov (third round)
16. (Chinese Taipei) Chiang Peng-lung (second round)
17. (Czech Republic) Petr Korbel (third round)
18. (China) Liu Guozheng (quarterfinals)
19. (Denmark) Michael Maze (semifinals)
20. (Hong Kong) Leung Chu Yan (second round)
21. (Sweden) Jan-Ove Waldner (third round)
22. (Sweden) Peter Karlsson (quarterfinals)
23. (Croatia) Zoran Primorac (first round)
24. (South Korea) Oh Sang-eun (semifinals)
25. (Hong Kong) Ko Lai Chak (second round)
26. (Netherlands) Trinko Keen (third round)
27. (China) Hao Shuai (quarterfinals)
28. (Poland) Lucjan Błaszczyk (fourth round)
29. (Russia) Fedor Kuzmin (first round)
30. (Hong Kong) Cheung Yuk (third round)
31. (Germany) Jörg Roßkopf (third round)
32. (France) Patrick Chila (first round)

== Finals ==
Quarterfinals
1	(China) Wang Liqin	8	12	11	8	11	11
7	(China) Chen Qi	11	10	4	11	9	3
22	(Sweden) Peter Karlsson	7	13	7	7	11	9
24	(South Korea) Oh Sang-eun	11	11	11	11	7	11
19	(Denmark) Michael Maze	5	8	7	12	11	11	11
27	(China) Hao Shuai	11	11	11	10	7	9	6
18	(China) Liu Guozheng	11	11	11	8	6	9
2	(China) Ma Lin	13	5	9	11	11	11

Semifinals
1	(China) Wang Liqin	11	12	11	9	11
24	(South Korea) Oh Sang-eun	7	10	2	11	6
19	(Denmark) Michael Maze	7	6	9	9
2	(China) Ma Lin	11	11	11	11

Final
1	(China) Wang Liqin	11	3	8	11	11	11
2	(China) Ma Lin	9	11	11	9	9	7

== Main draw ==
=== Top half ===
==== Section 1 ====
First round
1	(China) Wang L	11	11	11	9	11
(India) Achanta SK	8	8	5	11	8
(North Korea) Pak W-C	3	9	11	7	11	11	9
(Poland) B Such	11	11	7	11	7	6	11
(Denmark) A Bentsen	8	11	14	9	7	11	11
(Russia) A Liventsov	11	9	12	11	11	6	9
(Egypt) E-S Lashin	4	5	5	7
25	(Hong Kong) Ko L C	11	11	11	11
26	(Netherlands) T Keen	11	11	11	11
(Argentina) P Tabachnik	6	0	3	7
(Nigeria) S Toriola	11	11	7	11	11
(Germany) L Hielscher	8	9	11	5	8
(Hong Kong) Li C	11	11	11	13
(Bosnia and Herzegovina) S Milicevic	4	7	8	11
(Brazil) H Hoyama	4	4	5	2
14	(Austria) W Chen	11	11	11	11

Second round
1	(China) Wang L	11	11	11	11
(Poland) B Such	3	7	5	7
(Denmark) A Bentsen	11	11	11	5	8	11
25	(Hong Kong) Ko L C	6	8	4	11	11	9
26	(Netherlands) T Keen	11	11	11	11
(Nigeria) S Toriola	7	8	2	6
(Hong Kong) Li C	11	11	7	11	5	4	12
14	(Austria) W Chen	6	7	11	8	11	11	10

Third round
1	(China) Wang L	11	11	11	12
(Denmark) A Bentsen	5	5	6	10
26	(Netherlands) T Keen	11	13	11	7	13	9	5
(Hong Kong) Li C	7	11	2	11	15	11	11

Fourth round
1	(China) Wang L	11	11	9	10	11	6	11
(Hong Kong) Li C	6	4	11	12	3	11	5

==== Section 2 ====
First round
12	(China) Kong L	11	11	11	11
(Slovakia) P Sereda	4	8	4	5
(Egypt) A A Saleh	11	13	14	5	11
(Austria) R Gardos	2	11	12	11	5
(Germany) Z Fejer-Konnerth	11	11	2	11	7	11
(Austria) K Lengerov	8	3	11	8	11	5
(South Korea) Lee J-K	11	7	4	9	11	11	11
32	(France) P Chila	8	11	11	11	4	8	9
31	(Germany) J Roßkopf	11	11	11	11
(North Korea) Ri C-G	7	3	4	9
(Chinese Taipei) Wu C-C	10	11	11	11	11
(Poland) Wang Z	12	7	6	5	9
(Belgium) P Saive	11	11	5	6	11	13	10
(North Korea) Kim S-C	9	5	11	11	6	15	12
(Spain) C Machado	12	7	2	7
7	(China) Chen Q	14	11	11	11

Second round
12	(China) Kong L	11	11	11	11
(Egypt) A A Saleh	6	4	3	5
(Germany) Z Fejer-Konnerth	12	11	9	7	11	11
(South Korea) Lee J-K	10	6	11	11	5	6
31	(Germany) J Roßkopf	10	6	11	11	11	5	11
(Chinese Taipei) Wu C-C	12	11	6	8	6	11	3
(North Korea) Kim S-C	7	6	11	10	6
7	(China) Chen Q	11	11	7	12	11

Third round
12	(China) Kong L	13	11	11	11
(Germany) Z Fejer-Konnerth	11	5	5	7
31	(Germany) J Roßkopf	13	11	6	9	7
7	(China) Chen Q	11	13	11	11	11

Fourth round
12	(China) Kong L	8	6	8	6
7	(China) Chen Q	11	11	11	11

==== Section 3 ====
First round
8	(Chinese Taipei) Chuang CY	11	6	11	8	14	5	11
(Romania) A Filimon	8	11	9	11	12	11	7
(Japan) J Mizutani	11	10	9	14	11	11
(Norway) J Wang	9	12	11	12	5	2
(Italy) M Yang	11	20	2	11	13
(Brazil) C Matsumoto	4	18	11	8	11
(Wales) R Jenkins	5	11	11	9	5	8
22	(Sweden) P Karlsson	11	6	9	11	11	11
23	(Croatia) Z Primorac	4	11	11	11	7	11	3
(Greece) P Gionis	11	13	6	9	11	8	11
(France) C Bertin	7	5	4	7
(Japan) K Yoshida	11	11	11	11
(Spain) Z W He	11	11	11	7	11
(Czech Republic) M Klasek	5	9	5	11	7
(Russia) K Skachkov	6	6	11	11	5	9
9	(Austria) W Schlager	11	11	8	2	11	11

Second round
8	(Chinese Taipei) Chuang CY	10	9	11	10	11	11	9
(Japan) J Mizutani	12	11	7	12	6	8	11
(Italy) M Yang	9	11	11	8	7	4
22	(Sweden) P Karlsson	11	4	8	11	11	11
(Greece) P Gionis	11	10	11	7	11	11
(Japan) K Yoshida	3	12	5	11	9	9
(Spain) Z W He	7	11	8	5	11	11	11
9	(Austria) W Schlager	11	7	11	11	8	6	1

Third round
(Japan) J Mizutani	5	5	7	9
22	(Sweden) P Karlsson	11	11	11	11
(Greece) P Gionis	8	11	5	3	11	11	4
(Spain) Z W He	11	5	11	11	8	4	11

Fourth round
22	(Sweden) P Karlsson	11	8	11	6	7	11	11
(Spain) Z W He	7	11	5	11	11	7	9

==== Section 4 ====
First round
15	(Russia) A Smirnov	11	11	11	13	11	11
(Poland) D Gorak	5	8	13	15	9	7
(Hungary) F Pazsy	11	11	9	4	4	11	11
(Romania) C Cioti	5	9	11	11	11	7	5
(Sweden) J Lundqvist	11	12	11	13
(Slovakia) E Illas	9	10	6	11
(Austria) K Jindrak	5	8	4	5
24	(South Korea) Oh S-E	11	11	11	11
21	(Sweden) J-O Waldner	11	11	11	11
(Chinese Taipei) Chou T-Y	7	5	4	5
(Norway) I Moldovan	11	11	11	10	11
(Greece) N Tsiokas	4	5	8	12	7
(Norway) G Erlandsen	11	11	11	7	8	6	11
(South Korea) Choi H-J	6	8	4	11	11	11	9
(Russia) A Grigorev	11	3	4	7	3
4	(Belarus) V Samsonov	7	11	11	11	11

Second round
15	(Russia) A Smirnov	11	9	11	11	11
(Hungary) F Pazsy	9	11	9	3	3
(Sweden) J Lundqvist	11	11	10	3	11
24	(South Korea) Oh S-E	8	13	12	11	13
21	(Sweden) J-O Waldner	7	11	11	8	11	11
(Norway) I Moldovan	11	2	9	11	6	2
(Norway) G Erlandsen	7	1	9	2
4	(Belarus) V Samsonov	11	11	11	11

Third round
15	(Russia) A Smirnov	11	11	11	5	3	8	7
24	(South Korea) Oh S-E	8	3	6	11	11	11	11
21	(Sweden) J-O Waldner	4	13	10	7
4	(Belarus) V Samsonov	11	15	12	11

Fourth round
24	(South Korea) Oh S-E	11	11	4	11	9	7	11
4	(Belarus) V Samsonov	9	9	11	7	11	11	8

=== Bottom half ===
==== Section 5 ====
First round
3	(China) Wang H	11	11	11	11
(Israel) I Abramov	6	4	9	11
(Czech Republic) T Pavelka	14	8	12	11	14	11
(Dominican Republic) J Lin	12	11	10	5	16	7
(Slovenia) B Tokič	11	10	12	11	7	11	8
(Ukraine) O Didukh	8	12	10	4	11	13	11
(Australia) S Gerada	4	6	12	7
30	(Hong Kong) Cheung Y	11	11	14	11
19	(Denmark) M Maze	11	11	11	4	11
(Brazil) T Monteiro	5	6	2	11	8
(Croatia) R Tosic	14	11	9	7	13	11	15
(Chinese Taipei) Chang Y-S	12	7	11	11	15	6	13
(Bulgaria) Z Feng	11	11	11	8	11
(France) L Bobillier	7	7	5	11	7
(Spain) A Carneros	10	5	11	7	9
16	(Chinese Taipei) Chiang P-L	12	11	7	11	11

Second round
3	(China) Wang H	11	11	12	11
(Czech Republic) T Pavelka	4	7	10	8
(Ukraine) O Didukh	5	11	6	11	6	6
30	(Hong Kong) Cheung Y	11	7	11	9	11	11
19	(Denmark) M Maze	11	11	11	11	11	11
(Croatia) R Tosic	13	6	2	9	13	7
(Bulgaria) Z Feng	12	12	14	8	11
16	(Chinese Taipei) Chiang P-L	10	10	12	11	5

Third round
3	(China) Wang H	9	11	12	11	9	7	11
30	(Hong Kong) Cheung Y	11	5	10	6	11	11	8
19	(Denmark) M Maze	11	11	11	11
(Bulgaria) Z Feng	6	6	8	5

Fourth round
3	(China) Wang H	9	6	10	13
19	(Denmark) M Maze	11	11	12	15

==== Section 6 ====
First round
10	(Greece) K Kreanga	11	7	11	5	12	9	11
(Argentina) S Liu	5	11	6	11	10	11	9
(Japan) S Kishikawa	12	11	8	11	11	5	7
(France) D Eloi	14	9	11	8	4	11	11
(France) C Legout	12	8	12	11	8	9	11
(Czech Republic) R Kostal	10	11	10	9	11	11	8
(Spain) M Duran	9	9	4	5
20	(Hong Kong) Leung C Y	11	11	11	11
27	(China) Hao S	11	11	11	11
(Wales) A Robertson	9	3	4	7
(Singapore) Cai X	7	12	8	7
(Germany) C Süß	11	14	11	11
(Netherlands) D Heister	11	11	11	11
(Portugal) T Apolonia	4	6	8	6
(North Korea) An C-Y	9	3	4	11	6
6	(South Korea) Ryu S-M	11	11	11	9	11

Second round
10	(Greece) K Kreanga	11	10	10	16	11	11
(France) D Eloi	9	12	12	14	5	9
(France) C Legout	11	8	11	8	5	11	11
20	(Hong Kong) Leung C Y	4	11	5	11	11	8	6
27	(China) Hao S	8	11	11	5	12	11
(Germany) C Süß	11	6	5	11	10	7
(Netherlands) D Heister	11	12	10	12	11	8	11
6	(South Korea) Ryu S-M	7	10	12	10	13	11	4

Third round
10	(Greece) K Kreanga	8	12	7	17	11	11
(France) C Legout	11	10	11	15	7	8
27	(China) Hao S	11	11	11	11
(Netherlands) D Heister	5	9	8	7

Fourth round
10	(Greece) K Kreanga	11	12	9	9	11	4
27	(China) Hao S	13	10	11	11	8	11

==== Section 7 ====
First round
5	(Germany) T Boll	11	12	11	11	11
(Portugal) J Monteiro	9	10	5	13	8
(Croatia) W Jiang	11	11	9	4	10	11	4
(Canada) J Huang	7	2	11	11	12	7	11
(Sweden) J Persson	11	11	11	11
(Iceland) G Stephensen	9	3	4	5
(Sweden) P Gerell	11	11	11	9	11
29	(Russia) F Kuzmin	9	8	7	11	9
18	(China) Liu G	11	11	16	11	11
(Hungary) P Fazekas	5	7	18	5	9
(United States) I Lupulesku	11	6	6	9	11	11	9
(Denmark) M Monrad	9	11	11	11	5	7	11
(Serbia) S Grujić	11	11	11	10	11
(South Korea) Yoon J-Y	9	8	9	12	5
(Canada) F Kassam	5	9	5	8
13	(Romania) A Crişan	11	11	11	11

Second round
5	(Germany) T Boll	11	11	11	11
(Canada) J Huang	5	9	4	8
(Sweden) J Persson	11	9	11	11	11	11
(Sweden) P Gerell	4	11	13	7	6	9
18	(China) Liu G	11	11	11	11
(Denmark) M Monrad	5	2	6	5
(Serbia) S Grujić	11	5	12	11	11
13	(Romania) A Crişan	8	11	10	8	3

Third round
5	(Germany) T Boll	12	9	11	11	11	11
(Sweden) J Persson	10	11	4	13	5	8
18	(China) Liu G	11	9	9	13	11	11
(Serbia) S Grujić	6	11	11	11	3	7

Fourth round
5	(Germany) T Boll	5	11	11	5	11	8	13
18	(China) Liu G	11	3	4	11	8	11	15

==== Section 8 ====
First round
11	(Belgium) J-M Saive	11	11	11	11
(Turkey) S Avci	7	4	6	6
(Slovakia) L Pistej	6	5	11	8	5
(Germany) B Steger	11	11	9	11	11
(Serbia) A Karakašević	11	4	4	11	7	11	11
(Italy) M Mondello	7	11	11	3	11	7	5
(Japan) R Sakamoto	11	11	8	8	5
28	(Poland) L Błaszczyk	5	13	11	11	11
17	(Czech Republic) P Korbel	12	14	11	11
(Hungary) D Zwickl	10	12	4	8
(Estonia) V Vainula	11	8	12	3	6
(Denmark) F Tugwell	13	11	10	11	11
(South Korea) Lee J-W	11	13	9	11	11
(Ukraine) Y Zhmudenko	4	11	11	9	4
(Nigeria) K Nosiru	4	5	5	4
2	(China) Ma L	11	11	11	11

Second round
11	(Belgium) J-M Saive	11	11	11	5	8	12	10
(Germany) B Steger	9	7	9	11	11	14	12
(Serbia) A Karakašević	9	5	11	2	11	3
28	(Poland) L Błaszczyk	11	11	8	11	7	11
17	(Czech Republic) P Korbel	11	11	11	11
(Denmark) F Tugwell	5	9	7	4
(South Korea) Lee J-W	3	12	12	5	8	5
2	(China) Ma L	11	10	10	11	11	11

Third round
(Germany) B Steger	13	2	5	11	9	11	9
28	(Poland) L Błaszczyk	11	11	11	8	11	7	11
17	(Czech Republic) P Korbel	13	7	12	7	13	7	9
2	(China) Ma L	11	11	10	11	11	11	11

Fourth round
28	(Poland) L Błaszczyk	7	11	5	7
2	(China) Ma L	11	13	11	11
