= Table tennis at the 2004 Summer Olympics – Men's doubles =

Table tennis at the Olympics

Table tennis – Men's doubles at the Games of the XXVIII Olympiad
- Venue: Galatsi Olympic Hall
- Date: 15 to 21 August 2004
- Competitors: 64 from 24 nations

Medalists
1st place, gold medalist(s)		Chen Qi; Ma Lin	China
2nd place, silver medalist(s)		Ko Lai Chak; Li Ching	Hong Kong
3rd place, bronze medalist(s)		Michael Maze; Finn Tugwell	Denmark

These are the results of the men's doubles competition, one of two events for male competitors in table tennis at the 2004 Summer Olympics in Athens.

This event was not part of the table tennis programme from Beijing 2008 until Paris 2024 as Mens Teams, before the event was returned to the LA28 Games.

== Qualifying athletes ==
Athletes	Country
William Henzell and David Zalcberg	Australia
Massimiliano Mondello and Min Yang	Italy
Monday Merotohun and Segun Toriola	Nigeria
Mark Hazinski and Ilija Lupulesku	United States
Peter Akinlabi and Kazeem Nosiru	Nigeria
Juan Papic and Alejandro Rodriguez	Chile
Wenguan Johnny Huang and Faazil Kassam	Canada
Trevor Brown and Russ Lavale	Australia
Mohamed Boudjadja and Abdel Hakim Djaziri	Algeria
Shu Arai and Ryo Yuzawa	Japan
Momo Babungu and Jose Luyindula	Democratic Republic of the Congo
Petr Korbel and Richard Vyborny	Czech Republic
Oscar Gonzales and Pablo Tabachnik	Argentina
Panagiotis Gionis and Kalinikos Kreanga	Greece
Hugo Hanashiro and Hugo Hoyama	Brazil
Lars Hielscher and Jörg Roßkopf	Germany
Danny Heister and Trinko Keen	Netherlands
Chiang Peng-lung and Chuang Chih-yuan	Chinese Taipei
Michael Maze and Finn Tugwell	Denmark
Jörgen Persson and Jan-Ove Waldner	Sweden
Timo Boll and Zoltan Fejer-Konnerth	Germany
Dmitry Mazunov and Alexey Smirnov	Russia
Akira Kito and Toshio Tasaki	Japan
Joo Se-Hyuk and Oh Sang-Eun	South Korea
Chen Qi and Ma Lin	China
Lucjan Błaszczyk and Tomasz Krzeszewski	Poland
Karl Jindrak and Werner Schlager	Austria
Kong Linghui and Wang Hao	China
Lee Chul-Seung and Ryu Seung-Min	South Korea
Cheung Yuk and Leung Chu Yan	Hong Kong
Slobodan Grujić and Aleksandar Karakašević	Serbia and Montenegro
Ko Lai Chak and Li Ching	Hong Kong

== Seeds ==
1. Chen Qi / Ma Lin (CHN) (champion, gold medalist)
2. Kong Linghui / Wang Hao (CHN) (third round)
3. Ko Lai Chak / Li Ching (HKG) (final, silver medalist)
4. Lee Chul-seung / Ryu Seung-min (KOR) (quarterfinals)
5. Cheung Yuk / Leung Chu Yan (HKG) (third round)
6. Karl Jindrak / Werner Schlager (AUT) (third round)
7. Slobodan Grujić / Aleksandar Karakašević (SCG) (quarterfinals)
8. Lucjan Błaszczyk / Tomasz Krzeszewski (POL) (quarterfinals)

== Final rounds ==
Quarterfinals
1	Chen Qi (CHN); Ma Lin (CHN)	8	11	11	12	11
8	Lucjan Błaszczyk (POL); Tomasz Krzeszewski (POL)	11	6	6	10	7
Michael Maze (DEN); Finn Tugwell (DEN)	11	8	11	12	12
Jörgen Persson (SWE); Jan-Ove Waldner (SWE)	5	11	8	10	10
4	Lee Chul-Seung (KOR); Ryu Seung-Min (KOR)	12	7	9	4	8
Dmitry Mazunov (RUS); Alexey Smirnov (RUS)	10	11	11	11	11
7	Slobodan Grujić (SCG); Aleksandar Karakašević (SCG)	6	12	6	11	9
3	Ko Lai Chak (HKG); Li Ching (HKG)	11	10	11	13	11

Semifinals
1	Chen Qi (CHN); Ma Lin (CHN)	11	10	11	8	13	13
Michael Maze (DEN); Finn Tugwell (DEN)	9	12	7	11	11	11
Dmitry Mazunov (RUS); Alexey Smirnov (RUS)	5	9	11	11	8	6
3	Ko Lai Chak (HKG); Li Ching (HKG)	11	11	5	8	11	11

Gold medal match
1	Chen Qi (CHN); Ma Lin (CHN)	11	11	7	11	8	11
3	Ko Lai Chak (HKG); Li Ching (HKG)	6	7	11	8	11	5
Bronze medal match
Michael Maze (DEN); Finn Tugwell (DEN)	11	11	12	3	11	11
Dmitry Mazunov (RUS); Alexey Smirnov (RUS)	3	8	14	11	9	8

== Preliminary rounds ==
First round
William Henzell (AUS); David Zalcberg (AUS)	11	8	11	11	11
Massimiliano Mondello (ITA); Min Yang (ITA)	6	11	7	7	5
Monday Merotohun (NGR); Segun Toriola (NGR)	7	4	5	5
Mark Hazinski (USA); Ilija Lupulesku (USA)	11	11	11	11
Peter Akinlabi (NGR); Kazeem Nosiru (NGR)	11	11	15	11	11
Juan Papic (CHI); Alejandro Rodríguez (CHI)	9	5	17	9	7
Wenguan Johnny Huang (CAN); Faazil Kassam (CAN)	11	11	11	11
Trevor Brown (AUS); Russ Lavale (AUS)	9	3	6	8
Mohamed Boudjadja (ALG); Abdel Hakim Djaziri (ALG)	6	2	8	16
Shu Arai (JPN); Ryo Yuzawa (JPN)	11	11	11	18
Momo Babungu (COD); Jose Luyindula (COD)	3	4	6	4
Petr Korbel (CZE); Richard Výborný (CZE)	11	11	11	11
Oscar Gonzales (ARG); Pablo Tabachnik (ARG)	7	7	2	11	6
Panagiotis Gionis (GRE); Kalinikos Kreanga (GRE)	11	11	11	9	11
Hugo Hanashiro (BRA); Hugo Hoyama (BRA)	11	8	5	11	9	7
Lars Hielscher (GER); Jörg Roßkopf (GER)	9	11	11	5	11	11

Second round
Danny Heister (NED); Trinko Keen (NED)	15	12	6	14	11
William Henzell (AUS); David Zalcberg (AUS)	13	10	11	12	3
Chiang Peng-lung (TPE); Chuang Chih-yuan (TPE)	14	8	13	16	11
Mark Hazinski (USA); Ilija Lupulesku (USA)	12	11	11	14	9
Michael Maze (DEN); Finn Tugwell (DEN)	8	9	11	13	11	11
Peter Akinlabi (NGR); Kazeem Nosiru (NGR)	11	11	7	11	9	4
Jörgen Persson (SWE); Jan-Ove Waldner (SWE)	11	16	11	7	11	11
Wenguan Johnny Huang (CAN); Faazil Kassam (CAN)	7	18	3	11	7	6
Timo Boll (GER); Zoltan Fejer-Konnerth (GER)	11	11	11	11
Shu Arai (JPN); Ryo Yuzawa (JPN)	4	9	4	9
Dmitry Mazunov (RUS); Alexey Smirnov (RUS)	11	13	11	9	11
Petr Korbel (CZE); Richard Vyborny (CZE)	4	11	7	11	6
Akira Kito (JPN); Toshio Tasaki (JPN)	9	6	11	8	11	13	11
Panagiotis Gionis (GRE); Kalinikos Kreanga (GRE)	11	11	5	11	6	11	4
Joo Se-Hyuk (KOR); Oh Sang-Eun (KOR)	11	11	11	9	11
Lars Hielscher (GER); Jörg Roßkopf (GER)	5	6	6	11	9

Third round
1	Chen Qi (CHN); Ma Lin (CHN)	10	11	11	11	11	11
Danny Heister (NED); Trinko Keen (NED)	12	7	7	13	5	3
8	Lucjan Błaszczyk (POL); Tomasz Krzeszewski (POL)	7	12	8	11	11	11
Chiang Peng-lung (TPE); Chuang Chih-yuan (TPE)	11	10	11	7	7	5
6	Karl Jindrak (AUT); Werner Schlager (AUT)	10	7	6	7
Michael Maze (DEN); Finn Tugwell (DEN)	12	11	11	11
2	Kong Linghui (CHN); Wang Hao (CHN)	11	6	9	9	10
Jörgen Persson (SWE); Jan-Ove Waldner (SWE)	8	11	11	11	12
4	Lee Chul-Seung (KOR); Ryu Seung-Min (KOR)	11	11	11	11
Timo Boll (GER); Zoltan Fejer-Konnerth (GER)	7	9	7	9
5	Cheung Yuk (HKG); Leung Chu Yan (HKG)	12	7	8	7
Dmitry Mazunov (RUS); Alexey Smirnov (RUS)	14	11	11	11
7	Slobodan Grujić (SCG); Aleksandar Karakašević (SCG)	11	9	11	12	12
Akira Kito (JPN); Toshio Tasaki (JPN)	9	11	9	10	10
3	Ko Lai Chak (HKG); Li Ching (HKG)	11	11	11	5	14
Joo Se-Hyuk (KOR); Oh Sang-Eun (KOR)	8	9	3	11	12
