= European Youth Table Tennis Championships =

International table tennis competition

Logo of the 2010 European Youth Table Tennis Championships.

The European Youth Table Tennis Championships are held among cadets (under 15) and juniors (under 18). The first edition of the tournament was held in 1955 in Stuttgart and since then is held yearly in most cases.

Currently, the championships include team, doubles and singles events for both genders and age classes as well as a mixed doubles event. There are also consolation events for players defeated in the qualifying stages and in the first round of the singles events.

The final ranking of the junior boys' and girls' team events determines the qualification for the same year's World Youth Championships.

== Junior results ==
Year	City	Team		Single		Double		
Year	City	Boys	Girls	Boys	Girls	Boys	Girls	Mixed
2026	Gondomar	France	France	(Italy) D. Faso	(France) N. Guo Zheng	(France) N. Lam (France) A. Noirault	(France) N. Guo Zheng (France) L. Hochart	(France) A. Noirault (France) L. Hochart
2025	Ostrava	Romania	France	(Hungary) D. Szántosi	(Wales) A. Hursey	(Romania) I. Chiriță (Portugal) T. Abiodun	(France) L. Hochart (France) N. Guo Zheng	(Spain) D. Berzosa (Ukraine) V. Matiunina
2024	Malmö	Romania	France	(Romania) D. Movileanu	(Romania) B. Mei-Roșu	(Romania) I. Chiriță (Romania) A. Istrate	(Ukraine) V. Matiunina (Italy) N. Arlia	(Spain) D. Berzosa (Ukraine) V. Matiunina
2023	Gliwice	Romania	Romania	(Romania) E. Ionescu	(Romania) E. Zaharia	(Romania) E. Ionescu (Romania) D. Movileanu	(Poland) Z. Wielgos (Poland) A. Brzyska	(Romania) D. Movileanu (Romania) E. Zaharia
2022	Belgrade	Romania	Poland	(Romania) E. Ionescu	(Germany) A. Kaufmann	(Romania) E. Ionescu (Romania) D. Movileanu	(Croatia) H. Arapović (Czech Republic) L. Záděrová	(Romania) I. Chiriță (Germany) A. Kaufmann
2019	Ostrava	Russia	Germany	(Sweden) T. Moregard	(Poland) A. Węgrzyn	(Russia) L. Katsman (Russia) M. Grebnev	(Russia) K. Kazantseva (Russia) M. Tailakova	(Poland) S. Kulczycki (Poland) K. Węgrzyn
2018	Cluj-Napoca	France	Azerbaijan	(Greece) I. Sgouropoulos	(Azerbaijan) N. Jing	(Russia) L. Katsman (Russia) M. Grebnev	(Russia) A. Kolish (France) L. Gauthier	(France) J. Rolland (France) L. Gauthier
2017	Guimarães	Germany	Russia	(Greece) I. Sgouropoulos	(Azerbaijan) N. Jing	(Romania) C. Pletea (Russia) D. Ivonin	(Bulgaria) M. Yovkova (Hungary) F. Harasztovich	(France) J. Rolland (France) L. Gauthier
2016	Zagreb	Italy	Romania	(France) A. Cassin	(Romania) A. Diaconu	(Germany) T. Hippler (Germany) N. Hohmeier	(Belgium) L. Lung (Belgium) E. Loyen	(Belarus) A. Khanin (Belarus) D. Trigolos
2015	Bratislava	France	Romania	(Sweden) A. Källberg	(Romania) A. Diaconu	(Slovenia) D. Jorgić (Slovenia) D. Kožul	(Russia) M. Malanina (Russia) D. Chernoray	(Romania) A. Manole (Romania) A. Clapa
2014	Riva del Garda	France	France	(France) A. Cassin	(Germany) C. Mantz	(Hungary) A. Szudi (Hungary) N. Ecseki	(Portugal) R. Fins (Portugal) P. Maciel	(Croatia) T. Pucar (Croatia) L. Rakovac
2013	Ostrava	Italy	Romania	(France) E. Angles	(Germany) N. Mittelham	(Hungary) T. Lakatos (Hungary) A. Szudi	(Germany) N. Mittelham (Germany) T. Kraft	(Germany) K. Ort (Germany) N. Mittelham
2012	Schwechat	France	Romania	(France) T. Flore	(Romania) B. Szocs	(Poland) K. Kulpa (Poland) J. Dyjas	(Romania) B. Szocs (Germany) P. Solja	(Germany) F. Jost (Germany) P. Solja
2011	Kazan	France	Russia	(France) T. Flore	(Romania) B. Szocs	(France) Q. Robinot (France) S. Gauzy	(Romania) B. Szocs (Germany) P. Solja	(Romania) L. Munteanu (Romania) I. Ciobanu
2010	Istanbul	France	Romania	(Germany) P. Franziska	(Netherlands) B. Eerland	(Denmark) J. Groth (Romania) H. Szocs	(Germany) S. Winter (Slovakia) B. Balazova	(Romania) L. Munteanu (Romania) C. Hirici
2009	Prague	France	Romania	(France) Q. Robinot	(Ukraine) M. Pesotska	(Sweden) M. Oversjo (Sweden) K. Karlsson	(Romania) C. Hirici (Romania) A. Sebe	(Hungary) D. Kosiba (Hungary) D. Madarasz
2008	Terni	France	Ukraine	(England) P. Drinkhall	(Ukraine) M. Pesotska	(England) P. Drinkhall (England) D. Knight	(Ukraine) M. Pesotska (Slovakia) B. Balazova	(England) P. Drinkhall (Russia) E. Kolodyazhnaya
2007	Bratislava	England	Russia	(Russia) M. Paykov	(Romania) E. Samara	(France) A. Salifou (Russia) M. Paykov	(Romania) E. Samara (Russia) E. Kolodyazhnaya	(England) P. Drinkhall (Romania) E. Samara
2006	Sarajevo	Germany	Romania	(Portugal) M. Freitas	(Romania) D. Dodean	(Russia) S. Golovanov (Russia) M. Paykov	(Germany) A. Solja (Germany) R. Stähr	(France) E. Lebesson (Serbia) G. Feher
2005	Prague	France	Spain	(Germany) D. Ovtcharov	(Romania) D. Dodean	(Portugal) M. Freitas (Croatia) T. Kolarek	(Romania) D. Dodean (Romania) E. Samara	(Portugal) M. Freitas (Romania) D. Dodean
2004	Budapest	Germany	Spain	(Hungary) J. Jakab	(Spain) G. Dvorak	(Portugal) T. Apolonia (Portugal) M. Freitas	(France) C. Grundisch (Czech Republic) K. Penkavova	(Hungary) J. Jakab (Hungary) Li Bin
2003	Novi Sad	Sweden	Germany	(Germany) C. Süss	(Czech Republic) I. Vacenovska	(Czech Republic) T. Konecny (France) L. Bobillier	(Germany) G. Rohr (Germany) M. Rohr	(Germany) C. Süss (Germany) M. Rohr
2002	Moscow	Germany	Czech Republic	(Germany) C. Süss	(Hungary) G. Póta	(Germany) P. Baum (Germany) B. Rösner	(Russia) E. Petukhova (Russia) A. Voronova	(Germany) C. Süss (Germany) M. Rohr
2001	Terni	France	Hungary	(Poland) D. Górak	(Germany) L. Stumper	(Sweden) R. Svensson (Poland) D. Górak	(Hungary) G. Póta (Hungary) I. Csernyik	(Slovakia) L. Pištej (Slovakia) D. Filistovova
2000	Bratislava	Poland	Germany	(Romania) C. Cioti	(Croatia) C. Vaida	(Germany) F. Moritz (Germany) C. Stephan	(Italy) N. Stefanova (Croatia) S. Paovic	(Israel) O. Panielj (Croatia) C. Vaida
1999	Frýdek-Místek	Poland	Croatia	(Denmark) Michael Maze	(Austria) Liu Jia	(Denmark) M. Maze (Sweden) C. Asamoah	(Italy) Wang Yu (Croatia) A. Bakula	(Netherlands) Kalun Yu (Austria) Liu Jia
1998	Norcia	Germany	Russia	(Germany) T. Boll	(Austria) Liu Jia	(Germany) T. Boll (Germany) N. Stehle	(Austria) Liu Jia (Czech Republic) I. Weberova	(Czech Republic) J. Simoncik (Austria) Liu Jia
1997	Topoľčany	Germany	Italy	(Germany) T. Boll	(Slovakia) E. Ódorová	(Croatia) I. Juzbasic (Croatia) R. Tošić	(Italy) Ding Yang (Italy) Wang Yu	(Romania) A. Crișan (Slovakia) E. Ódorová
1996	Frýdek-Místek	Germany	Russia	(Sweden) M. Molin	(Romania) M. Encea	(Netherlands) J. de Cock (Italy) V. Piacentini	(Romania) M. Encea (Romania) M. Steff	(Greece) P. Gionis (Federal Republic of Yugoslavia) S. Erdelji
1995	The Hague	Germany	Russia	(Russia) A. Smirnov	(Croatia) T. Boroš	(Russia) A. Smirnov (Denmark) M. Monrad	(Romania) A. Manac (Romania) M. Steff	(Russia) A. Smirnov (Russia) O. Kashulina
1994	Paris	Denmark	Romania	(Austria) K. Lengerov	(Russia) S. Ganina	(Russia) A. Smirnov (Russia) D. Gavrilov	(Romania) A. Manac (Romania) M. Steff	(Romania) A. Filimon (Romania) M. Steff
1993	Ljubljana	Russia	Hungary	(Belarus) V. Samsonov	(Slovakia) Z. Poliackova	(Belarus) V. Samsonov (Germany) S. Kòstner	(Hungary) K. Harsanyi (Hungary) J. Herczig	(Germany) S. Kòstner (Germany) N. Delle
1992	Topoľčany	CIS	CIS	(Commonwealth of Independent States) V. Samsonov	(Romania) G. Cojocaru	(Poland) L. Blaszczyk (Poland) T. Krzeszewski	(Commonwealth of Independent States) O. Kusch (Commonwealth of Independent States) T. Kulagina	(Commonwealth of Independent States) V. Samsonov (Commonwealth of Independent States) O. Kusch
1991	Granada	Sweden	Hungary	(Socialist Federal Republic of Yugoslavia) S. Grujić	(Hungary) K. Toth	(Sweden) D. Gustafson (Sweden) A. Rasberg	(Austria) P. Fichtinger (Poland) A. Januszyk	(Germany) T. Wosik (Germany) E. Schall
1990	Hollabrunn	Soviet Union	Soviet Union	(Germany) T. Wosik	(Hungary) V. Wirth	(Soviet Union) S. Noskov (Soviet Union) A. Levadnyi	(Hungary) V. Ellö (Hungary) K. Toth	(Poland) P. Szafranek (Poland) A. Januszyk
1989	Luxembourg	Soviet Union	Hungary	(Soviet Union) D. Gusev	(Hungary) G. Wirth	(Germany) T. Wosik (Germany) J. Hong	(Hungary) G. Wirth (Hungary) V. Wirth	(Soviet Union) S. Noskov (Soviet Union) O. Lapushina
1988	Novi Sad	Soviet Union	Yugoslavia	(Czechoslovakia) P. Korbel	(Romania) O. Badescu	(Soviet Union) D. Gusev (Soviet Union) D. Mazunov	(Hungary) G. Wirth (Hungary) J. Hegedüs	(Romania) C. Creanga (Romania) O. Badescu
1987	Athens	Soviet Union	Romania	(Romania) D. Cioca	(Soviet Union) I. Palina	(Soviet Union) A. Mazunov (Soviet Union) S. Vardanyan	(Romania) O. Badescu (Romania) K. Lohr	(France) O. Marmurek (France) E. Coubat

== Cadet results ==
Year	City	Team		Single		Double		
Year	City	Boys	Girls	Boys	Girls	Boys	Girls	Mixed
2026	Gondomar	Poland	France	(Turkey) G. Öçal	(Individual Neutral Athletes) A. Ilimbetova	(Austria) L. Fegerl (Spain) L. Mayorov	(Individual Neutral Athletes) A. Ilimbetova (Individual Neutral Athletes) V. Tolmacheva	(Spain) L. Mayorov (Poland) A. Nawrocka
2025	Ostrava	Italy	Germany	(Italy) D. Faso	(Germany) K. Itagaki	(Italy) D. Faso (Italy) F. Trevisan	(France) A. Nodin (France) L.-A. Bocquet	(France) N. Tessier (France) L.-A. Bocquet
2024	Malmö	Italy	Germany	(Poland) P. Żyworonek	(Czech Republic) H. Kodetová	(Poland) P. Żyworonek (Poland) S. Michna	(Austria) N. Skerbinz (Austria) E. Fuchs	(Poland) A. Pakuła (Poland) K. Rajkowska
2023	Gliwice	Portugal	Germany	(Portugal) T. Abiodun	(Czech Republic) H. Kodetová	(Poland) M. Sakowicz (Poland) P. Żyworonek	(Germany) K. Itagaki (Germany) J. Neumann	(France) N. Pilard (France) N. Guo Zheng
2022	Belgrade	France	Romania	(France) F. Coton	(Belgium) L. Massart	(France) F. Mourier (France) A. Noirault	(Romania) B. Mei-Roșu (Poland) N. Bogdanowicz	(Poland) A. Gromek (Poland) N. Bogdanowicz
2019	Ostrava	Russia	France	(Romania) D. Movileanu	(Romania) E. Zaharia	(Romania) I. Chiriță (Romania) E. Ionescu	(France) P. Pavade (Romania) E. Zaharia	(France) T. Poret (France) P. Pavade
2018	Cluj-Napoca	France	Romania	(Poland) M. Kubik	(Romania) E. Zaharia	(Poland) M. Kubik (Croatia) I. Ban	(France) P. Pavade (France) C. Chomis	(Italy) A. Puppo (Russia) A. Slautina
2017	Guimarães	Russia	Russia	(Russia) V. Sidorenko	(Russia) E. Abraamian	(Sweden) T. Möregårdh (Sweden) M. Friis	(Germany) S. Klee (Germany) A. Bondareva	(Russia) V. Sidorenko (Russia) E. Zironova
2016	Zagreb	Russia	Russia	(Russia) V. Sidorenko	(Russia) M. Taylakova	(Austria) M. Kolodziejczyk (Moldova) V. Ursu	(Russia) E. Zironova (Romania) T. Plaian	(Russia) L. Katsman (Russia) K. Kazantseva
2015	Bratislava	France	Russia	(Romania) C. Pletea	(Russia) M. Taylakova	(France) I. Bertrand (France) L. Bardet	(Croatia) E. Marn (Croatia) A. Pavlović	(Romania) C. Pletea (Russia) M. Taylakova
2014	Riva del Garda	France	Romania	(Romania) R. Sipos	(Romania) A. Diaconu	(France) N. Givone (France) I. Bertrand	(Romania) A. Diaconu (Belgium) L. Lung	(Romania) C. Pletea (Romania) A. Diaconu
2013	Ostrava	Czech Republic	Romania	(Czech Republic) T. Polansky	(Romania) A. Diaconu	(Belarus) A. Khanin (Czech Republic) T. Polansky	(Romania) A. Diaconu (Romania) A. Clapa	(Romania) A. Manole (Romania) A. Clapa
2012	Schwechat	France	Germany	(France) A. Cassin	(Germany) A. Lemmer	(Sweden) A. Kallberg (Sweden) S. Berglund	(Romania) A. Diaconu (Romania) M. Lupu	(France) C. Akkuzu (France) A. Zarif
2011	Kazan	Germany	Russia	(France) A. Landrieu	(Germany) N. Mittelham	(Czech Republic) D. Reutspies (Germany) D. Qiu	(Israel) N. Trosman (Germany) N. Mittelham	(Portugal) D. Chen (Israel) N. Trosman
2010	Istanbul	France	Romania	(Italy) L. Mutti	(Romania) B. Szocs	(France) T. Flore (France) E. Angles	(Romania) B. Szocs (Romania) I. Ciobanu	(France) T. Flore (France) C. Pang
2009	Prague	France	Germany	(France) S. Gauzy	(Germany) P. Solja	(France) S. Gauzy (France) E. Angles	(Romania) B. Szocs (Russia) Y. Noskova	(France) B. Brossier (Russia) Y. Noskova
2008	Terni	France	Romania	(England) G. Evans	(Germany) P. Solja	(Belgium) J. Indeherberg (Belgium) E. Vanrossome	(Germany) P. Solja (Germany) N. Sillus	(France) R. Lorentz (France) L. Gasnier
2007	Bratislava	Germany	Russia	(Romania) H. Szocs	(Romania) C. Hirici	(France) T. Le Breton (France) R. Lorentz	(Slovakia) B. Balazova (Germany) S. Winter	(Russia) G. Grishenin (Russia) T. Ryabova
2006	Sarajevo	Sweden	Ukraine	(Croatia) B. Kovac	(Ukraine) M. Pesotska	(Poland) P. Chodorski (Croatia) B. Kovac	(Ukraine) M. Pesotska (Slovakia) B. Balazova	(Sweden) K. Karlsson (Sweden) M. Petterson
2005	Prague	England	Russia	(England) P. Drinkhall	(Russia) E. Kolodyazhnaya	(France) P. Bezard (Croatia) B. Kovac	(Germany) A. Solja (Germany) R. Stähr	(Russia) A. Shibaev (Russia) E. Kolodyazhnaya
2004	Budapest	France	Romania	(Turkey) P. Jiang	(Poland) N. Partyka	(Czech Republic) A. Schwarzer (Latvia) M. Burģis	(Romania) E. Samara (Ukraine) M. Pesotska	(Czech Republic) F. Placek (Poland) N. Partyka
2003	Novi Sad	Germany	Romania	(Germany) R. Filus	(Hungary) Li Bin	(Czech Republic) A. Schwarzer (Portugal) M. Freitas	(Spain) G. Dvorak (Romania) E. Samara	(Belarus) D. Baltrushko (Belarus) M. Viktorchyk
2002	Moscow	Germany	Spain	(Portugal) M. Freitas	(Romania) D. Dodean	(Belarus) D. Baltrushko (Belarus) D. Davidovitch	(Slovakia) O. Dzelinska (Slovakia) D. Kolarova	(Ukraine) Y. Zhmudenko (Spain) G. Dvorak
2001	Terni	Hungary	Spain	(Russia) A. Pletnev	(Russia) M. Zelenova	(Hungary) J. Jakab (Hungary) K. Molnar	(Slovakia) I. Kmotorkova (Federal Republic of Yugoslavia) E. Tapai	(Federal Republic of Yugoslavia) Ž. Pete (Federal Republic of Yugoslavia) E. Tapai
2000	Bratislava	Germany	Russia	(Germany) C. Süß	(Federal Republic of Yugoslavia) A. Erdelji	(France) L. Bobillier (Croatia) T. Zubcic	(Czech Republic) I. Vacenovská (Czech Republic) M. Smistikova	(Czech Republic) A. Gavlas (Czech Republic) I. Vacenovská
1999	Frýdek-Místek	Hungary	Germany	(Hungary) D. Zwickl	(Germany) G. Rohr	(Hungary) D. Zwickl (Czech Republic) A. Gavlas	(Germany) G. Rohr (Germany) M. Rohr	(Hungary) D. Zwickl (Hungary) G. Póta
1998	Norcia	Romania	Germany	(Romania) C. Cioti	(Ukraine) T. Sorochynska	(Hungary) D. Zwickl (Slovakia) P. Sereda	(Romania) C. Vaida (Italy) N. Stefanova	(Romania) C. Cioti (Romania) C. Vaida
1997	Bratislava	France	Croatia	(Russia) F. Kuzmin	(Croatia) S. Paović	(Czech Republic) J. Vrablik (Czech Republic) A. Gavlas	(Russia) O. Bagina (Russia) V. Ignatieva	(Czech Republic) J. Vrablik (Croatia) S. Paović
1996	Frýdek-Místek	Russia	Hungary	(Denmark) M. Maze	(Slovenia) M. Safran	(Russia) A. Liventsov (Russia) P. Vaske	(Croatia) A. Bakula (Croatia) I. Poljak	(Germany) D. Halcour (Croatia) A. Bakula
1995	The Hague	Germany	Russia	(Germany) T. Boll	(Poland) Miao Miao	(Germany) T. Boll (Germany) N. Stehle	(Poland) Miao Miao (Czech Republic) I. Weberova	(Poland) J. Tomicki (Poland) Miao Miao
1994	Paris	Sweden	Germany	(Sweden) M. Molin	(Slovenia) P. Dermastija	(Sweden) J. Lundqvist (Sweden) S. Nyqvist	(Czech Republic) R. Štrbíková (Slovakia) E. Ódorová	(Czech Republic) D. Marek (Czech Republic) R. Strbikova
1993	Ljubljana	Italy	Russia	(Hungary) R. Gardos	(Romania) M. Steff	(Italy) V. Piacentini (Italy) U. Giardina	(Romania) M. Encea (Romania) M. Steff	(Hungary) R. Gardos (Romania) M. Encea
1992	Topoľčany	CIS	Romania	(Germany) T. Schröder	(Commonwealth of Independent States) S. Ganina	(Germany) T. Schröder (Germany) Z. Fejer-Konnerth	(Romania) A. Manac (Romania) M. Steff	(Czech Republic) B. Vozicky (Czech Republic) M. Myskova
1991	Granada	Germany	Romania	(Bulgaria) K. Lengerov	(Romania) A. Manac	(Soviet Union) A. Viokurov (Soviet Union) G. Renzin	(Romania) A. Manac (Romania) M. Enescu	(Romania) A. Filimon (Romania) A. Manac
1990	Hollabrunn	Soviet Union	Yugoslavia	(Soviet Union) S. Andrianov	(Romania) A. Gogorita	(Soviet Union) V. Samsonov (Soviet Union) E. Fadeev	(Soviet Union) T. Kulagina (Soviet Union) E. Kulagina	(Soviet Union) V. Samsonov (Soviet Union) T. Kulagina
1989	Luxembourg	Hungary	Soviet Union	(Soviet Union) V. Samsonov	(Romania) G. Cojocaru	(Sweden) D. Gustfson (Sweden) A. Rasberg	(Romania) G. Cojocaru (Romania) L. Niculae	(Soviet Union) V. Samsonov (Soviet Union) O. Kusch
1988	Novi Sad	West Germany	Hungary	(West Germany) T. Wosik	(Hungary) V. Ellö	(Soviet Union) V. Samsonov (Soviet Union) A. Averkin	(Hungary) V. Ellö (Hungary) K. Toth	(Soviet Union) V. Samsonov (Soviet Union) O. Kusch
1987	Athens	Soviet Union	Romania	(Socialist Federal Republic of Yugoslavia) S. Grujić	(Hungary) G. Wirth	(Czechoslovakia) T. Janasek (Czechoslovakia) M. Olejnik	(Hungary) G. Wirth (Hungary) V. Ellö	(Germany) T. Wosik (Germany) Nienhaus

== See also ==
- Table tennis
- European Table Tennis Union
- World Table Tennis Championships
- List of table tennis players
