= List of European Under-21 Table Tennis Championships medalists =

The following is the List of European Under-21 Table Tennis Championships medalists.

== Results of Events ==
The tables below are European Table Tennis Under-21 Champions lists of individual events (Men's and Women's Singles, Men's and Women's Doubles and Mixed).

=== Men's singles ===
Year	Host City	Gold	Silver	Bronze	Ref.
2017	Sochi	(Croatia) Tomislav Pucar	(Germany) Dang Qiu	(Slovenia) Darko Jorgić	
2017	Sochi	(Croatia) Tomislav Pucar	(Germany) Dang Qiu	(Slovenia) Deni Kožul	
2018	Minsk	(Czech Republic) Tomáš Polanský	(Romania) Cristian Pletea	(Romania) Rareş Şipoş	
2018	Minsk	(Czech Republic) Tomáš Polanský	(Romania) Cristian Pletea	(Slovenia) Darko Jorgić	
2019	Gondomar	(Greece) Ioannis Sgouropoulos	(Germany) Gerrit Engemann	(Romania) Rareş Şipoş	
2019	Gondomar	(Greece) Ioannis Sgouropoulos	(Germany) Gerrit Engemann	(Russia) Vladimir Sidorenko	
2020	Varaždin	(Russia) Vladimir Sidorenko	(Romania) Rareş Şipoş	(Moldova) Andrei Putuntica	
2020	Varaždin	(Russia) Vladimir Sidorenko	(Romania) Rareş Şipoş	(Belgium) Laurens Devos	
2021	Spa	(Greece) Ioannis Sgouropoulos	(Russia) Maksim Grebnev	(Russia) Lev Katsman	
2021	Spa	(Greece) Ioannis Sgouropoulos	(Russia) Maksim Grebnev	(France) Irvin Bertrand	
2022	Cluj-Napoca	(Poland) Samuel Kulczycki	(Moldova) Vladislav Ursu	(Poland) Miłosz Redzimski	
2022	Cluj-Napoca	(Poland) Samuel Kulczycki	(Moldova) Vladislav Ursu	(Austria) Maciej Kolodziejczyk	
2023	Sarajevo	(Poland) Miłosz Redzimski	(Hungary) Csaba András	(Poland) Samuel Kulczycki	
2023	Sarajevo	(Poland) Miłosz Redzimski	(Hungary) Csaba András	(Romania) Andrei Istrate	
2024	Skopje	(Poland) Miłosz Redzimski	(Poland) Maciej Kubik	(France) Thibault Poret	
2024	Skopje	(Poland) Miłosz Redzimski	(Poland) Maciej Kubik	(Germany) Andre Bertelsmeier	
2025	Bratislava	(France) Flavien Coton	(Romania) Iulian Chiriță	(Spain) Miguel Pantoja	
2025	Bratislava	(France) Flavien Coton	(Romania) Iulian Chiriță	(Germany) Andre Bertelsmeier	
2026	Cluj-Napoca	(Germany) Andre Bertelsmeier	(Germany) Wim Verdonschot	(England) Connor Green	
2026	Cluj-Napoca	(Germany) Andre Bertelsmeier	(Germany) Wim Verdonschot	(Romania) Darius Movileanu	

=== Women's singles ===
Year	Host City	Gold	Silver	Bronze	Ref.
2017	Sochi	(Germany) Chantal Mantz	(Germany) Yuan Wan	(Russia) Mariia Tailakova	
2017	Sochi	(Germany) Chantal Mantz	(Germany) Yuan Wan	(Belgium) Lisa Lung	
2018	Minsk	(Russia) Mariia Tailakova	(Russia) Valeria Shcherbatykh	(Russia) Anastasia Kolish	
2018	Minsk	(Russia) Mariia Tailakova	(Russia) Valeria Shcherbatykh	(Poland) Natalia Bajor	
2019	Gondomar	(Romania) Adina Diaconu	(Russia) Maria Malanina	(Belarus) Nadezhda Bogdanova	
2019	Gondomar	(Romania) Adina Diaconu	(Russia) Maria Malanina	(Romania) Tania Plaian	
2020	Varaždin	(France) Prithika Pavade	(Romania) Andreea Dragoman	(Romania) Adina Diaconu	
2020	Varaždin	(France) Prithika Pavade	(Romania) Andreea Dragoman	(Sweden) Christina Källberg	
2021	Spa	(Germany) Annett Kaufmann	(Russia) Mariia Tailakova	(Germany) Franziska Schreiner	
2021	Spa	(Germany) Annett Kaufmann	(Russia) Mariia Tailakova	(Romania) Andreea Dragoman	
2022	Cluj-Napoca	(Romania) Elena Zaharia	(Germany) Franziska Schreiner	(Czech Republic) Zdena Blaskova	
2022	Cluj-Napoca	(Romania) Elena Zaharia	(Germany) Franziska Schreiner	(France) Prithika Pavade	
2023	Sarajevo	(Croatia) Hana Arapović	(Germany) Sophia Klee	(Germany) Mia Griesel	
2023	Sarajevo	(Croatia) Hana Arapović	(Germany) Sophia Klee	(Italy) Nicole Arlia	
2024	Skopje	(Ukraine) Veronika Matiunina	(Romania) Elena Zaharia	(Poland) Anna Brzyska	
2024	Skopje	(Ukraine) Veronika Matiunina	(Romania) Elena Zaharia	(Croatia) Hana Arapović	
2025	Bratislava	(Wales) Anna Hursey	(Ukraine) Veronika Matiunina	(Romania) Elena Zaharia	
2025	Bratislava	(Wales) Anna Hursey	(Ukraine) Veronika Matiunina	(Romania) Ioana Singeorzan	
2026	Cluj-Napoca	(Romania) Bianca Mei-Roșu	(Slovenia) Sara Tokić	(France) Alexia Nodin	
2026	Cluj-Napoca	(Romania) Bianca Mei-Roșu	(Slovenia) Sara Tokić	(Poland) Zuzanna Wielgos	

=== Men's doubles ===
Year	Host City	Gold	Silver	Bronze	Ref.
2017	Sochi	(Denmark) Anders Lind (Slovakia) Alexander Valuch	(Croatia) Tomislav Pucar (Hungary) Bence Majoros	(Sweden) Anton Källberg (Sweden) Simon Berglund	
2017	Sochi	(Denmark) Anders Lind (Slovakia) Alexander Valuch	(Croatia) Tomislav Pucar (Hungary) Bence Majoros	(Hungary) Ádám Szudi (Hungary) Nandor Ecseki	
2018	Minsk	(Turkey) Ibrahim Gündüz (Turkey) Abdullah Yigenler	(Poland) Patryk Zatowka (Poland) Marek Badowski	(Russia) Konstantin Chernov (Russia) Artur Abusev	
2018	Minsk	(Turkey) Ibrahim Gündüz (Turkey) Abdullah Yigenler	(Poland) Patryk Zatowka (Poland) Marek Badowski	(Czech Republic) Tomáš Polanský (Germany) Dennis Klein	
2019	Gondomar	(Slovenia) Darko Jorgić (Slovenia) Peter Hribar	(Slovakia) Tibor Spanik (Slovakia) Adam Brat	(Italy) Antonio Amato (Italy) Daniele Pinto	
2019	Gondomar	(Slovenia) Darko Jorgić (Slovenia) Peter Hribar	(Slovakia) Tibor Spanik (Slovakia) Adam Brat	(Russia) Denis Ivonin (Russia) Vladimir Sidorenko	
2020	Varaždin	(Romania) Cristian Pletea (Romania) Rareş Şipoş	(Moldova) Andrei Putuntica (Czech Republic) Jiri Martinko	(France) Irvin Bertrand (France) Leo De Nodrest	
2020	Varaždin	(Romania) Cristian Pletea (Romania) Rareş Şipoş	(Moldova) Andrei Putuntica (Czech Republic) Jiri Martinko	(Belgium) Florian Cnudde (Belgium) Laurens Devos	
2021	Spa	(Belgium) Adrien Rassenfosse (Belgium) Olav Kosolosky	(Hungary) Csaba András (Croatia) Ivor Ban	(Austria) Maciej Kolodziejczyk (Moldova) Vladislav Ursu	
2021	Spa	(Belgium) Adrien Rassenfosse (Belgium) Olav Kosolosky	(Hungary) Csaba András (Croatia) Ivor Ban	(Russia) Lev Katsman (Russia) Maksim Grebnev	
2022	Cluj-Napoca	(Hungary) Csaba András (Croatia) Ivor Ban	(Italy) John Oyebode (Italy) Carlo Rossi	(Poland) Maciej Kubik (Poland) Samuel Kulczycki	
2022	Cluj-Napoca	(Hungary) Csaba András (Croatia) Ivor Ban	(Italy) John Oyebode (Italy) Carlo Rossi	(Austria) Maciej Kolodziejczyk (Moldova) Vladislav Ursu	
2023	Sarajevo	(France) Hugo Deschamps (France) Thibault Poret	(Poland) Maciej Kubik (Poland) Samuel Kulczycki	(Romania) Eduard Ionescu (Romania) Darius Movileanu	
2023	Sarajevo	(France) Hugo Deschamps (France) Thibault Poret	(Poland) Maciej Kubik (Poland) Samuel Kulczycki	(Romania) Iulian Chiriță (Romania) Andrei Istrate	
2024	Skopje	(Poland) Maciej Kubik (Poland) Miłosz Redzimski	(Romania) Eduard Ionescu (Romania) Darius Movileanu	(Croatia) Ivor Ban (Croatia) Borna Petek	
2024	Skopje	(Poland) Maciej Kubik (Poland) Miłosz Redzimski	(Romania) Eduard Ionescu (Romania) Darius Movileanu	(Romania) Iulian Chiriță (Romania) Andrei Istrate	
2025	Bratislava	(Romania) Eduard Ionescu (Romania) Darius Movileanu	(Germany) Andre Bertelsmeier (Portugal) Tiago Abiodun	(Croatia) Leon Benko (Croatia) Ivan Hencl	
2025	Bratislava	(Romania) Eduard Ionescu (Romania) Darius Movileanu	(Germany) Andre Bertelsmeier (Portugal) Tiago Abiodun	(Romania) Iulian Chiriță (Romania) Andrei Istrate	
2026	Cluj-Napoca	(Germany) Andre Bertelsmeier (Germany) Wim Verdonschot	(Italy) Danilo Faso (Turkey) Görkem Öçal	(England) Connor Green (Luxembourg) Maël Van Dessel	
2026	Cluj-Napoca	(Germany) Andre Bertelsmeier (Germany) Wim Verdonschot	(Italy) Danilo Faso (Turkey) Görkem Öçal	(Belgium) Tom Closset (Czech Republic) Štěpán Brhel	

=== Women's doubles ===
Year	Host City	Gold	Silver	Bronze	Ref.
2017	Sochi	(Belgium) Eline Loyen (Belgium) Lisa Lung	(Romania) Adina Diaconu (Romania) Andreea Dragoman	(Belarus) Alina Nikitchanka (Belarus) Hanna Patseyeva	
2017	Sochi	(Belgium) Eline Loyen (Belgium) Lisa Lung	(Romania) Adina Diaconu (Romania) Andreea Dragoman	(Russia) Ekaterina Guseva (Czech Republic) Zdena Blaskova	
2018	Minsk	(Poland) Natalia Bajor (Ukraine) Solomiya Brateyko	(Belgium) Lisa Lung (Belgium) Margo Degraef	(Romania) Adina Diaconu (Romania) Andreea Dragoman	
2018	Minsk	(Poland) Natalia Bajor (Ukraine) Solomiya Brateyko	(Belgium) Lisa Lung (Belgium) Margo Degraef	(Spain) Sofia-Xuan Zhang (Spain) Ana Garcia	
2019	Gondomar	(England) Tin-Tin Ho (Austria) Karoline Mischek	(Poland) Anna Wegrzyn (Poland) Katarzyna Wegrzyn	(Spain) Sofia-Xuan Zhang (France) Audrey Zarif	
2019	Gondomar	(England) Tin-Tin Ho (Austria) Karoline Mischek	(Poland) Anna Wegrzyn (Poland) Katarzyna Wegrzyn	(Belgium) Lisa Lung (Belgium) Margo Degraef	
2020	Varaždin	(France) Leili Mostafavi (France) Nolwenn Fort	(Russia) Mariia Tailakova (Russia) Kristina Kazantseva	(Poland) Anna Wegrzyn (Poland) Katarzyna Wegrzyn	
2020	Varaždin	(France) Leili Mostafavi (France) Nolwenn Fort	(Russia) Mariia Tailakova (Russia) Kristina Kazantseva	(Romania) Adina Diaconu (Romania) Andreea Dragoman	
2021	Spa	(Turkey) Özge Yılmaz (Turkey) Ece Haraç	(Serbia) Sabina Surjan (Serbia) Tijana Jokic	(Russia) Mariia Tailakova (Russia) Elizabet Abraamian	
2021	Spa	(Turkey) Özge Yılmaz (Turkey) Ece Haraç	(Serbia) Sabina Surjan (Serbia) Tijana Jokic	(Slovakia) Tatiana Kukulkova (Slovakia) Ema Labosova	
2022	Cluj-Napoca	(Turkey) Özge Yılmaz (Turkey) Ece Haraç	(Italy) Nicole Arlia (Italy) Gaia Monfardini	(France) Camille Lutz (France) Prithika Pavade	
2022	Cluj-Napoca	(Turkey) Özge Yılmaz (Turkey) Ece Haraç	(Italy) Nicole Arlia (Italy) Gaia Monfardini	(Poland) Anna Brzyska (Poland) Zuzanna Wielgos	
2023	Sarajevo	(Germany) Mia Griesel (Romania) Bianca Mei-Roșu	(Ukraine) Anastasiya Dymytrenko (Ukraine) Veronika Matiunina	(Portugal) Inês Matos (Portugal) Matilde Pinto	
2023	Sarajevo	(Germany) Mia Griesel (Romania) Bianca Mei-Roșu	(Ukraine) Anastasiya Dymytrenko (Ukraine) Veronika Matiunina	(France) Agathe Avezou (France) Isà Cok	
2024	Skopje	(Romania) Bianca Mei-Roșu (Romania) Elena Zaharia	(Romania) Luciana Mitrofan (Slovenia) Sara Tokić	(France) Léana Hochart (France) Élise Pujol	
2024	Skopje	(Romania) Bianca Mei-Roșu (Romania) Elena Zaharia	(Romania) Luciana Mitrofan (Slovenia) Sara Tokić	(Croatia) Hana Arapović (Germany) Sophia Klee	
2025	Bratislava	(Wales) Anna Hursey (Germany) Mia Griesel	(Romania) Elena Zaharia (Romania) Bianca Mei-Roșu	(Poland) Zuzanna Wielgos (Poland) Anna Brzyska	
2025	Bratislava	(Wales) Anna Hursey (Germany) Mia Griesel	(Romania) Elena Zaharia (Romania) Bianca Mei-Roșu	(Croatia) Hana Arapović (Romania) Ioana Singeorzan	
2026	Cluj-Napoca	(Poland) Anna Brzyska (Poland) Zuzanna Wielgos	(Ukraine) Veronika Matiunina (Romania) Bianca Mei-Roșu	(France) Léana Hochart (France) Élise Pujol	
2026	Cluj-Napoca	(Poland) Anna Brzyska (Poland) Zuzanna Wielgos	(Ukraine) Veronika Matiunina (Romania) Bianca Mei-Roșu	(Moldova) Alexandra Chiriacova (Slovenia) Sara Tokić	

=== Mixed doubles ===
Year	Host City	Gold	Silver	Bronze	Ref.
2020	Varaždin	(Romania) Cristian Pletea (Romania) Adina Diaconu	(France) Bastien Rembert (France) Nolwenn Fort	(France) Irvin Bertrand (France) Leili Mostafavi	
2020	Varaždin	(Romania) Cristian Pletea (Romania) Adina Diaconu	(France) Bastien Rembert (France) Nolwenn Fort	(Belgium) Laurens Devos (Belgium) Lisa Lung	
2021	Spa	(Romania) Rareş Şipoş (Romania) Andreea Dragoman	(France) Bastien Rembert (France) Isa Cok	(Russia) Vladimir Sidorenko (Russia) Mariia Tailakova	
2021	Spa	(Romania) Rareş Şipoş (Romania) Andreea Dragoman	(France) Bastien Rembert (France) Isa Cok	(France) Irvin Bertrand (France) Leili Mostafavi	
2022	Cluj-Napoca	(Romania) Andrei Istrate (Romania) Luciana Mitrofan	(France) Lilian Bardet (France) Prithika Pavade	(Romania) Darius Movileanu (Romania) Elena Zaharia	
2022	Cluj-Napoca	(Romania) Andrei Istrate (Romania) Luciana Mitrofan	(France) Lilian Bardet (France) Prithika Pavade	(Hungary) Csaba András (Hungary) Helga Dari	
2023	Sarajevo	(Poland) Samuel Kulczycki (Poland) Zuzanną Wielgoś	(Romania) Eduard Ionescu (Romania) Ioana Singeorzan	(Poland) Miłosz Redzimski (Poland) Anna Brzyska	
2023	Sarajevo	(Poland) Samuel Kulczycki (Poland) Zuzanną Wielgoś	(Romania) Eduard Ionescu (Romania) Ioana Singeorzan	(France) Flavien Coton (Germany) Mia Griesel	
2024	Skopje	(Croatia) Ivor Ban (Croatia) Hana Arapović	(Romania) Darius Movileanu (Romania) Elena Zaharia	(Poland) Maciej Kubik (Poland) Anna Brzyska	
2024	Skopje	(Croatia) Ivor Ban (Croatia) Hana Arapović	(Romania) Darius Movileanu (Romania) Elena Zaharia	(France) Hugo Deschamps (France) Léana Hochart	
2025	Bratislava	(Romania) Darius Movileanu (Romania) Elena Zaharia	(Germany) Wim Verdonschot (Germany) Josephina Neumann	(Portugal) Tiago Abiodun (Croatia) Hana Arapović	
2025	Bratislava	(Romania) Darius Movileanu (Romania) Elena Zaharia	(Germany) Wim Verdonschot (Germany) Josephina Neumann	(Spain) Daniel Berzosa (Ukraine) Veronika Matiunina	
2026	Cluj-Napoca	(Romania) Iulian Chiriță (Wales) Anna Hursey	(Germany) Wim Verdonschot (Germany) Josephina Neumann	(Romania) Andrei Istrate (Italy) Nicole Arlia	
2026	Cluj-Napoca	(Romania) Iulian Chiriță (Wales) Anna Hursey	(Germany) Wim Verdonschot (Germany) Josephina Neumann	(Slovenia) Brin Vovk (Slovenia) Sara Tokić	
