= European Under-21 Table Tennis Championships =

European Under-21 Championships
Tournament information
- Sport: Table tennis
- Established: 2017
- Administrator: European Table Tennis Union
- Tournament format(s): Singles: Groups/Knockout; Doubles: Knockout
- Participants: 56 men; 56 women

The European Under-21 Championships is an annual table tennis tournament organised under the authority of the European Table Tennis Union (ETTU). The introduction of the event to the table tennis calendar was approved at the ETTU Congress in 2015, with the first competition held in Sochi, Russia, in February 2017.

== Editions ==
Edition	Year	Host City	Country	Events
1	2017	Sochi	Russia	4
2	2018	Minsk	Belarus	4
3	2019	Gondomar	Portugal	4
4	2020	Varaždin	Croatia	5
5	2021	Spa	Belgium	5
6	2022	Cluj-Napoca	Romania	5
7	2023	Sarajevo	Bosnia and Herzegovina	5
8	2024	Skopje	North Macedonia	5
9	2025	Bratislava	Slovakia	5
10	2026	Cluj-Napoca	Romania	5

== Champions ==
Year	Location	Men's singles	Women's singles	Men's doubles	Women's doubles	Mixed doubles	Ref.
2017	(Russia) Sochi	(Croatia) Tomislav Pucar	(Germany) Chantal Mantz	(Denmark) Anders Lind (Slovakia) Alexander Valuch	(Belgium) Eline Loyen (Belgium) Lisa Lung	not held	
2018	(Belarus) Minsk	(Czech Republic) Tomáš Polanský	(Russia) Mariia Tailakova	(Turkey) Ibrahim Gündüz (Turkey) Abdullah Yigenler	(Poland) Natalia Bajor (Ukraine) Solomiya Brateyko	not held	
2019	(Portugal) Gondomar	(Greece) Ioannis Sgouropoulos	(Romania) Adina Diaconu	(Slovenia) Darko Jorgić (Slovenia) Peter Hribar	(England) Tin-Tin Ho (Austria) Karoline Mischek	not held	
2020	(Croatia) Varaždin	(Russia) Vladimir Sidorenko	(France) Prithika Pavade	(Romania) Cristian Pletea (Romania) Rareş Şipoş	(France) Leili Mostafavi (France) Nolwenn Fort	(Romania) Cristian Pletea (Romania) Adina Diaconu	
2021	(Belgium) Spa	(Greece) Ioannis Sgouropoulos	(Germany) Annett Kaufmann	(Belgium) Adrien Rassenfosse (Belgium) Olav Kosolosky	(Turkey) Özge Yılmaz (Turkey) Ece Haraç	(Romania) Rareş Şipoş (Romania) Andreea Dragoman	
2022	(Romania) Cluj-Napoca	(Poland) Samuel Kulczycki	(Romania) Elena Zaharia	(Croatia) Ivor Ban (Hungary) Csaba András	(Turkey) Ece Haraç (Turkey) Özge Yılmaz	(Romania) Andrei Istrate (Romania) Luciana Mitrofan	
2023	(Bosnia and Herzegovina) Sarajevo	(Poland) Miłosz Redzimski	(Croatia) Hana Arapović	(France) Hugo Deschamps (France) Thibault Poret	(Germany) Mia Griesel (Romania) Bianca Mei-Roșu	(Poland) Samuel Kulczycki (Poland) Zuzanna Wielgos	
2024	(North Macedonia) Skopje	(Poland) Miłosz Redzimski	(Ukraine) Veronika Matiunina	(Poland) Maciej Kubik (Poland) Miłosz Redzimski	(Romania) Bianca Mei-Roșu (Romania) Elena Zaharia	(Croatia) Ivor Ban (Croatia) Hana Arapović	
2025	(Slovakia) Bratislava	(France) Flavien Coton	(Wales) Anna Hursey	(Romania) Eduard Ionescu (Romania) Darius Movileanu	(Wales) Anna Hursey (Germany) Mia Griesel	(Romania) Darius Movileanu (Romania) Elena Zaharia	
2026	(Romania) Cluj-Napoca	(Germany) Andre Bertelsmeier	(Romania) Bianca Mei-Roșu	(Germany) Andre Bertelsmeier (Germany) Wim Verdonschot	(Poland) Anna Brzyska (Poland) Zuzanna Wielgos	(Romania) Iulian Chiriță (Wales) Anna Hursey	

== See also ==
- European Table Tennis Championships
- Table Tennis European Youth Championships
- International Table Tennis Federation
