= Table tennis at the 2012 Summer Olympics – Men's singles =

Table tennis – men's singles at the Games of the XXX Olympiad
- Venue: ExCeL London
- Date: 28 July to 2 August
- Competitors: 69 from 45 nations

Medalists
1st place, gold medalist(s)		Zhang Jike	China
2nd place, silver medalist(s)		Wang Hao	China
3rd place, bronze medalist(s)		Dimitrij Ovtcharov	Germany

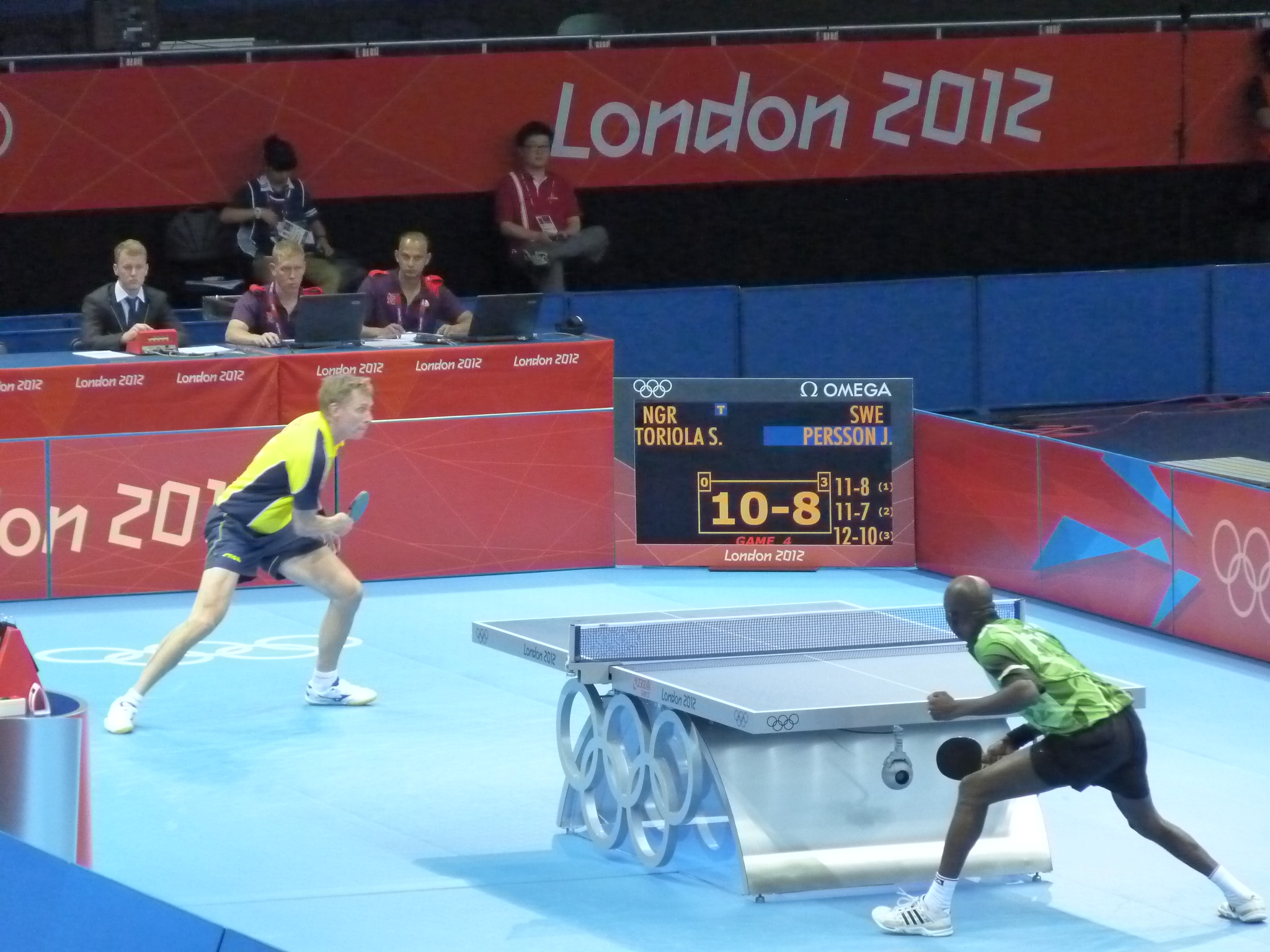
Jörgen Persson against Segun Toriola in the first round

The men's singles table tennis event was part of the table tennis programme at the 2012 Summer Olympics in London. The event took place from Saturday 28 July to Thursday 2 August 2012 at ExCeL London. The tournament was a single elimination tournament with a third place playoff played between the two losing semi-finalists.

The draw was conducted on 25 July 2012.

== Schedule ==
All times are British Summer Time (UTC+1).

Dates	Start time	Round
28 July	9:45	Preliminary round
28 July	16:00	First round
29 July	11:00	Second round
30 July	10:00	Third round
30 July	19:00	Fourth round
31 July	20:00	Quarterfinals
1 August	10:00	Quarterfinals
2 August	10:00	Semifinals
2 August	14:30	Bronze medal match
2 August	15:30	Gold medal match

== Seeds ==
Seeds were based on the ITTF World Ranking lists published in July 2012 with a maximum of 2 players per country. The top 16 seeded players qualified directly to the third round.

1. Zhang Jike (CHN) (champion, gold medalist)
2. Wang Hao (CHN) (final, silver medalist)
3. Jun Mizutani (JPN) (fourth round)
4. Timo Boll (GER) (fourth round)
5. Chuang Chih-yuan (TPE) (semifinals, fourth place)
6. Joo Sae-hyuk (KOR) (third round)
7. Oh Sang-eun (KOR) (fourth round)
8. Dimitrij Ovtcharov (GER) (semifinals, bronze medalist)
9. Vladimir Samsonov (BLR) (fourth round)
10. Gao Ning (SIN) (fourth round)
11. Jiang Tianyi (HKG) (quarterfinals)
12. Seiya Kishikawa (JPN) (quarterfinals)
13. Michael Maze (DEN) (quarterfinals)
14. Adrien Mattenet (FRA) (third round)
15. Adrian Crișan (ROU) (quarterfinals)
16. Alexander Shibaev (RUS) (third round)

The players seeded from 17 to 32 qualified directly to the second round.

17. Marcos Freitas (POR) (third round)
18. Chen Weixing (AUT) (fourth round)
19. Tang Peng (HKG) (second round)
20. Bojan Tokič (SLO) (third round)
21. Panagiotis Gionis (GRE) (third round)
22. João Monteiro (POR) (second round)
23. Aleksandar Karakašević (SRB) (second round)
24. Alexey Smirnov (RUS) (third round)
25. Werner Schlager (AUT) (third round)
26. Yang Zi (SIN) (second round)
27. Andrej Gaćina (CRO) (fourth round)
28. Zoran Primorac (CRO) (second round)
29. Kalinikos Kreanga (GRE) (third round)
30. He Zhiwen (ESP) (third round)
31. Bora Vang (TUR) (third round)
32. Kim Hyok-bong (PRK) (fourth round)

== Draw ==
=== Finals ===
Semifinals
1	Zhang Jike (CHN)	11	11	5	11	11
8	Dimitrij Ovtcharov (GER)	8	3	11	9	8
5	Chuang Chih-yuan (TPE)	13	2	10	6	9
2	Wang Hao (CHN)	11	11	12	11	11

Gold medal match
1	Zhang Jike (CHN)	18	11	11	10	13
2	Wang Hao (CHN)	16	5	6	12	11
Bronze medal match
8	Dimitrij Ovtcharov (GER)	12	9	8	13	11	14
5	Chuang Chih-yuan (TPE)	10	11	11	11	5	12

=== Top half ===
==== Section 1 ====
Second round
31	B Vang (TUR)	6	10	12	11	12	12
61	Q Aruna (NGR)	11	12	10	2	10	10
51	W Henzell (AUS)	2	11	11	11	6	12
22	J Monteiro (POR)	11	8	9	6	11	10
24	A Smirnov (RUS)	11	11	11	11
45	M Burģis (LAT)	5	5	4	9
57	S Ghosh (IND)	11	6	5	9	7
32	H-B Kim (PRK)	9	11	11	11	11

Third round
1	J Zhang (CHN)	11	11	11	11
31	B Vang (TUR)	8	8	5	7
51	W Henzell (AUS)	10	11	13	9	9	11	7
9	V Samsonov (BLR)	12	8	11	11	11	8	11
11	T Jiang (HKG)	11	11	6	12	12
24	A Smirnov (RUS)	9	5	11	10	10
32	H-B Kim (PRK)	11	6	8	11	11	15
6	S-H Joo (KOR)	5	11	11	7	8	13

Fourth round
1	J Zhang (CHN)	4	11	11	8	8	11	11
9	V Samsonov (BLR)	11	7	5	11	11	7	7
11	T Jiang (HKG)	14	6	11	9	11	11	15
32	H-B Kim (PRK)	12	11	13	11	6	7	13

Quarterfinals
1	J Zhang (CHN)	11	8	11	11	11
11	T Jiang (HKG)	4	11	4	9	6

==== Section 2 ====
Second round
26	Z Yang (SIN)	7	7	8	11	9
46	P Drinkhall (GBR)	11	11	11	4	11
40	O Didukh (UKR)	7	5	6	7
18	W Chen (AUT)	11	11	11	11
29	K Kreanga (GRE)	5	11	11	11	11
38	J-M Saive (BEL)	11	3	9	7	8
49	E-s Lashin (EGY)	11	8	12	5	10	11	11
28	Z Primorac (CRO)	6	11	10	11	12	9	8

Third round
8	D Ovtcharov (GER)	11	11	11	11
46	P Drinkhall (GBR)	8	5	9	4
18	W Chen (AUT)	11	16	11	11
14	A Mattenet (FRA)	3	14	6	9
13	M Maze (DEN)	12	11	11	8	11
29	K Kreanga (GRE)	10	6	8	11	3
49	E-s Lashin (EGY)	4	11	9	5	6
3	J Mizutani (JPN)	11	9	11	11	11

Fourth round
8	D Ovtcharov (GER)	11	16	11	11
18	W Chen (AUT)	8	14	8	5
13	M Maze (DEN)	11	11	11	11
3	J Mizutani (JPN)	7	6	4	6

Quarterfinals
8	D Ovtcharov (GER)	11	12	1	9	9	11	11
13	M Maze (DEN)	8	10	11	11	11	6	9

=== Bottom half ===
==== Section 3 ====
Second round
19	P Tang (HKG)	8	5	11	9	11	11	10
32	No Alamian (IRI)	11	11	7	11	8	5	12
39	Z Wang (POL)	11	11	11	8	3	5	12
30	Z He (ESP)	8	9	7	11	11	11	14
27	A Gaćina (CRO)	11	11	11	11
40	J Persson (SWE)	5	6	7	4
52	D Zwickl (HUN)	12	12	10	11	12
23	A Karakašević (SRB)	10	10	12	8	10

Third round
4	T Boll (GER)	11	11	12	12
32	No Alamian (IRI)	8	5	10	10
30	Z He (ESP)	11	8	5	11	8	9
15	A Crișan (ROU)	5	11	11	9	11	11
16	A Shibaev (RUS)	6	7	11	8	11	11	8
27	A Gaćina (CRO)	11	11	9	11	8	9	11
52	D Zwickl (HUN)	8	8	6	9
5	C-y Chuang (TPE)	11	11	11	11

Fourth round
4	T Boll (GER)	9	11	13	10	6
15	A Crișan (ROU)	11	8	15	12	11
27	A Gaćina (CRO)	8	5	4	11	11	5
5	C-y Chuang (TPE)	11	11	11	7	3	11

Quarterfinals
15	A Crișan (ROU)	3	4	4	5
5	C-y Chuang (TPE)	11	11	11	11

==== Section 4 ====
Second round
17	M Freitas (POR)	11	11	12	11
43	J Lin (DOM)	6	5	10	3
58	O Assar (EGY)	5	9	7	9
21	P Gionis (GRE)	11	11	11	11
20	B Tokič (SLO)	11	7	11	11	3	9	11
48	S Liu (ARG)	0	11	7	6	11	11	8
42	M Bobocica (ITA)	12	9	11	8	12	10
25	W Schlager (AUT)	10	11	5	11	14	12

Third round
7	S-E Oh (KOR)	11	11	11	11
17	M Freitas (POR)	8	6	2	8
21	P Gionis (GRE)	7	11	9	11	7	11	10
12	S Kishikawa (JPN)	11	7	11	8	11	8	12
10	N Gao (SIN)	11	11	11	14
20	B Tokič (SLO)	7	7	5	12
25	W Schlager (AUT)	3	11	9	8	9
2	H Wang (CHN)	11	8	11	11	11

Fourth round
7	S-E Oh (KOR)	8	6	8	11	8
12	S Kishikawa (JPN)	11	11	11	7	11
10	N Gao (SIN)	9	7	9	11	3
2	H Wang (CHN)	11	11	11	7	11

Quarterfinals
12	S Kishikawa (JPN)	4	5	3	5
2	H Wang (CHN)	11	11	11	11

== Preliminary rounds ==
=== Top half ===
==== Section 1 ====
First round
35	C Machado (ESP)	11	6	11	11	8	6
61	Q Aruna (NGR)	6	11	3	13	11	11
35	A Pattantyús (HUN)	11	8	9	11	9
51	W Henzell (AUS)	13	11	11	6	11
45	M Burģis (LAT)	14	11	7	9	13	15	11
62	P-L Hinse (CAN)	12	2	11	11	11	17	8
44	G Tsuboi (BRA)	9	12	11	10	11	10
57	S Ghosh (IND)	11	14	7	12	5	12

==== Section 2 ====
Preliminary round
60	I Al-Hasan (KUW)	11	8	7	13	11	11
67	S Idowu (CGO)	3	11	11	11	6	6

First round
46	P Drinkhall (GBR)	11	12	11	11
60	I Al-Hasan (KUW)	9	10	9	4
40	O Didukh (UKR)	11	7	10	11	11	7	11
56	M Aguirre (PAR)	7	11	12	4	7	11	9
38	J-M Saive (BEL)	11	8	11	11	11
50	M Jevtović (SRB)	3	11	7	6	8
35	P Gerell (SWE)	11	4	8	10	11	11	9
49	E-s Lashin (EGY)	7	11	11	12	8	8	11

=== Bottom half ===
==== Section 3 ====
Preliminary round
64	J Han (AUS)	9	11	11	8	11	11
68	M Agbetoglo (TOG)	11	7	1	11	8	9
53	S Toriola (NGR)	9	11	11	11	12
65	A Ho (CAN)	11	5	6	5	10

First round
32	No Alamian (IRI)	11	11	11	13
64	J Han (AUS)	5	7	7	11
39	Z Wang (POL)	8	11	9	9	11	11	12
59	H Hoyama (BRA)	11	9	11	11	5	8	10
40	J Persson (SWE)	11	11	12	9	11
53	S Toriola (NGR)	8	7	10	11	6
47	A Bentsen (DEN)	9	7	10	11	8
52	D Zwickl (HUN)	11	11	12	4	11

==== Section 4 ====
Preliminary round
54	S-N Kim (PRK)	11	11	11	11
66	T Wang (USA)	5	4	7	4
55	A Pereira (CUB)	11	11	11	11
69	Y Shing (VAN)	2	2	3	3

First round
43	J Lin (DOM)	11	5	11	6	3	13	11
54	S-N Kim (PRK)	9	11	8	11	11	11	9
32	Y Zhmudenko (UKR)	11	6	11	9	12
58	O Assar (EGY)	8	11	13	11	14
48	S Liu (ARG)	11	11	11	11
63	S Saka (CGO)	3	5	9	6
42	M Bobocica (ITA)	11	11	11	11
55	A Pereira (CUB)	6	7	3	4
