= Wei Yan Tao =

Chinese table tennis player

Personal information
- Full name: Wei Yan Tao
- Nationality: China
- Born: February 12, 1986 (age 40) Tianmen, Hubei, China
- Height: 1.71 m (5.6 ft)
- Weight: 63 kg (139 lb)

Sport
- Sport: Table tennis
- Playing style: left-handed, handshake grip

Wei Yan Tao (Chinese: 魏炎涛; born 12 February 1986) is a male table tennis player from China. He joined the Chinese National Table Tennis Team in 2003.he was not part of the elite senior team that was selected for the 2003 world championships teams. His results at that time suggest that he was a developing prospect rather than an established national-team star. Wei is left-handed, shakehand grip. He played for Zheshang Bank Table Tennis Club in China Table Tennis Super League in 2008 and 2009. Wei moved to New Zealand in 2016 and started his own table tennis club–Tornado Table Tennis in 2019 in North Shore Auckland.Wei Was appointed as the head coach of the New Zealand national men's team for 2022 & 2023 ITTF Oceania Championship and 2024 ITTF World Team Championship Busan.

== Major performances ==
2003 North Korea Open - runner-up team

2005 Table Tennis Match in China National Games - made it through to the round of 16 in Men Singles

2006 Germany Masters - beat Lucjan Blaszczyk from Poland in group game of men singles

2006 Sydney Invitation - champion singles and doubles

2007 Germany Masters - made it through to the round of 12 in Men Singles

2007 China National Table Tennis Championships - bronze mixed doubles.

2008 China Table Tennis Super League - runner-up team.

2009 China Table Tennis Super League - runner-up team

2009 Table Tennis Match in China National Games - runner-up team

2011 China Liantong Cup Table Tennis Challenge(Guangdong) - champion singles

2011 China National Coastal City Invitation - champion singles

2011 China National Sports College Table Tennis Tournament - champions singles, doubles and team

2013 Table Tennis Match in Guangzhou Employee Sports Meeting - champion singles and team

2014 China National Public Security Table Tennis Tournament - champion singles and team
