= 2021 European Table Tennis Championships =

- Date: 28 September – 3 October 2021
- Edition: 40th
- Location: Cluj-Napoca, Romania
- European Table Tennis Championships

The 2021 European Table Tennis Championships were held in Cluj-Napoca, Romania, from 28 September to 3 October 2021.

The 2021 championships will include men's and women's team events.

== Medal summary ==
=== Medallists ===
Event	Gold	Silver	Bronze
Men's team	Germany; Patrick Franziska; Ruwen Filus; Benedikt Duda; Dang Qiu; Kay Stumper	Russia; Kirill Skachkov; Alexander Shibaev; Vladimir Sidorenko; Lev Katsman; Maksim Grebnev	Denmark; Jonathan Groth; Anders Lind; Tobias Rasmussen; Thor Christensen; Mikkel Hindersson
Men's team	Germany; Patrick Franziska; Ruwen Filus; Benedikt Duda; Dang Qiu; Kay Stumper	Russia; Kirill Skachkov; Alexander Shibaev; Vladimir Sidorenko; Lev Katsman; Maksim Grebnev	Sweden; Mattias Falck; Jon Persson; Anton Källberg; Truls Möregårdh
Women's team	Germany; Nina Mittelham; Sabine Winter; Chantal Mantz; Annett Kaufmann	Romania; Bernadette Szőcs; Elizabeta Samara; Daniela Dodean; Adina Diaconu; Andreea Dragoman	Portugal; Fu Yu; Jieni Shao; Rita Fins; Inês Matos
Women's team	Germany; Nina Mittelham; Sabine Winter; Chantal Mantz; Annett Kaufmann	Romania; Bernadette Szőcs; Elizabeta Samara; Daniela Dodean; Adina Diaconu; Andreea Dragoman	France; Jia Nan Yuan; Audrey Zarif; Pauline Chasselin; Prithika Pavade

=== Medal table ===
* Host nation (Romania)

Rank	nation	Gold	Silver	Bronze	Total
1	Germany (GER)	2	0	0	2
2	Romania (ROU)*	0	1	0	1
2	Russia (RUS)	0	1	0	1
4	Denmark (DEN)	0	0	1	1
4	France (FRA)	0	0	1	1
4	Portugal (POR)	0	0	1	1
4	Sweden (SWE)	0	0	1	1
Totals (7 entries)		2	2	4	8

== Men's team ==
=== Players ===
Austria		Belgium		Belarus		Croatia		Czech Republic		Denmark	
Robert Gardos	WR 26	Cedric Nuytinck	WR 70	Pavel Platonov	WR 131	Tomislav Pucar	WR 34	Lubomír Jančařík	WR 83	Jonathan Groth	WR 31
Daniel Habesohn	WR 44	Florent Lambiet	WR 104	Aleksandr Khanin	WR 152	Andrej Gaćina	WR 48	Tomáš Polanský	WR 141	Anders Lind	WR 82
Andreas Levenko	WR 138	Robin Devos	WR 120	Vladislav Rukletsov	WR 348	Frane Kojić	WR 96	Jiří Martinko	WR 325	Tobias Rasmussen	WR 208
Alexander Chen	WR 250	Martin Allegro	WR 122	Gleb Shamruk	WR 465	Filip Zeljko	WR 273	Tomáš Martinko	WR 993	Thor Christensen	WR 666
David Serdaroglu	WR 253	Florian Cnudde	WR 202			Ivor Ban	WR 670			Mikkel Hindersson	NR
England		Spain		Finland		France		Germany		Greece	
Liam Pitchford	WR 15	Álvaro Robles	WR 63	Benedek Oláh	WR 85	Simon Gauzy	WR 19	Patrick Franziska	WR 14	Ioannis Sgouropoulos	WR 151
Paul Drinkhall	WR 57	Jesús Cantero	WR 191	Alex Naumi	WR 266	Emmanuel Lebesson	WR 38	Ruwen Filus	WR 36	Giorgos Konstantinopoulos	WR 447
Samuel Walker	WR 97	Carlos Caballero	WR 248	Samuli Soine	WR 704	Can Akkuzu	WR 81	Benedikt Duda	WR 42	Konstantinos Konstantinopoulos	WR 469
Tom Jarvis	WR 172	Carlos Franco	WR 272	Sam Khosravi	WR 1125	Alexandre Cassin	WR 145	Dang Qiu	WR 52	Nikolaos Antoniadis	NR
								Kay Stumper	WR 668		
Hungary		Italy		Luxembourg		Netherlands		Poland		Portugal	
Bence Majoros	WR 61	Niagol Stoyanov	WR 101	Eric Glod	WR 209	Gabrielius Camara	WR 1542	Jakub Dyjas	WR 67	Marcos Freitas	WR 23
Ádám Szudi	WR 115	Mihai Bobocica	WR 124	Luka Mladenovic	WR 213	Barry Berben	NR	Marek Badowski	WR 84	Tiago Apolónia	WR 60
Nándor Ecseki	WR 134	Leonardo Mutti	WR 163	Michely Gilles	WR 406	Milo de Boer	NR	Samuel Kulczycki	WR 362	João Monteiro	WR 79
Patrik Juhász	WR 584	Marco Rech Daldosso	WR 656	Traian Ciociu	WR 1058	Kas van Oost	NR	Maciej Kubik	WR 491	João Geraldo	WR 95
				Eric Thillen	WR 1632					Diogo Carvalho	WR 185
Romania		Russia		Slovenia		Serbia		Slovakia		Sweden	
Ovidiu Ionescu	WR 55	Kirill Skachkov	WR 53	Darko Jorgić	WR 25	Žolt Peto	WR 154	Wang Yang	WR 35	Mattias Falck	WR 9
Hunor Szőcs	WR 128	Alexander Shibaev	WR 86	Deni Kožul	WR 110	Marko Jevtović	WR 220	Ľubomír Pištej	WR 68	Jon Persson	WR 43
Rareș Șipoș	WR 153	Vladimir Sidorenko	WR 181	Peter Hribar	WR 300	Dimitrije Levajac	WR 375	Jakub Zelinka	WR 633	Anton Källberg	WR 51
Darius Movileanu	WR 702	Lev Katsman	WR 281	Tilen Cvetko	WR 459			Adam Klajber	WR 1427	Truls Möregårdh	WR 77
Eduard Ionescu	WR 886	Maksim Grebnev	WR 540								
Turkey		Ukraine									
İbrahim Gündüz	WR 169	Yevhen Pryshchepa	WR 105								
Abdullah Yiğenler	WR 205	Yaroslav Zhmudenko	WR 139								
Batuhan Ulucak	WR 1083	Viktor Yefimov	WR 369								
Tugay Yılmaz	WR 1514	Anton Limonov	WR 422								

=== Group stage ===
Group A

Pos	Team	Pld	W	L	Pts	Promotion	GER	UKR	BLR
1	Germany	2	2	0	4	Promote to quarterfinals	—	3–0	3–0
2	Ukraine	2	1	1	3		0–3	—	3–2
3	Belarus	2	0	2	2		0–3	2–3	—

Source: euro2021tt.com

Group B

Pos	Team	Pld	W	L	Pts	Promotion	SWE	BEL	GRE
1	Sweden	2	2	0	4	Promote to quarterfinals	—	3–0	3–0
2	Belgium	2	1	1	3		0–3	—	3–2
3	Greece	2	0	2	2		0–3	2–3	—

Source: euro2021tt.com

Group C

Pos	Team	Pld	W	L	Pts	Promotion	ENG	SVK	SRB
1	England	2	2	0	4	Promote to quarterfinals	—	3–0	3–2
2	Slovakia	2	1	1	3		0–3	—	3–1
3	Serbia	2	0	2	2		2–3	1–3	—

Source: euro2021tt.com

Group D

Pos	Team	Pld	W	L	Pts	Promotion	AUT	POL	ESP
1	Austria	2	2	0	4	Promote to quarterfinals	—	3–1	3–2
2	Poland	2	1	1	3		1–3	—	3–1
3	Spain	2	0	2	2		2–3	1–3	—

Source: euro2021tt.com

Group E

Pos	Team	Pld	W	L	Pts	Promotion	DEN	POR	TUR
1	Denmark	2	2	0	4	Promote to quarterfinals	—	3–0	3–0
2	Portugal	2	1	1	3		0–3	—	3–0
3	Turkey	2	0	2	2		0–3	0–3	—

Source: euro2021tt.com

Group F

Pos	Team	Pld	W	L	Pts	Promotion	RUS	FRA	NED
1	Russia	2	2	0	4	Promote to quarterfinals	—	3–0	3–0
2	France	2	1	1	3		0–3	—	3–0
3	Netherlands	2	0	2	2		0–3	0–3	—

Source: euro2021tt.com

Group G

Pos	Team	Pld	W	L	Pts	Promotion	CZE	CRO	ITA	HUN
1	Czech Republic	3	3	0	6	Promote to quarterfinals	—	3–2	3–0	3–1
2	Croatia	3	2	1	5		2–3	—	3–2	3–0
3	Italy	3	1	2	4		0–3	2–3	—	3–1
4	Hungary	3	0	3	3		1–3	0–3	1–3	—

Source: euro2021tt.com

Group H

Pos	Team	Pld	W	L	Pts	Promotion	ROU	SLO	FIN	LUX
1	Romania	3	3	0	6	Promote to quarterfinals	—	3–2	3–1	3–1
2	Slovenia	3	2	1	5		2–3	—	3–1	3–1
3	Finland	3	1	2	4		1–3	1–3	—	3–1
4	Luxembourg	3	0	3	3		1–3	1–3	1–3	—

Source: euro2021tt.com

=== Final round ===
Quarterfinals
Germany	3
Czech Republic	1
Denmark	3
England	2
Austria	2
Russia	3
Romania	1
Sweden	3

Semifinals
Germany	3
Denmark	0
Russia	3
Sweden	0

Final
Germany	3
Russia	1

== Women's team ==
=== Players ===
Austria		Belgium		Belarus		Croatia		Czech Republic		England	
Sofia Polcanova	WR 16	Nathalie Marchetti	WR 140	Daria Trigolos	WR 103	Mateja Jeger	WR 122	Hana Matelová	WR 48	Tin-Tin Ho	WR 94
Amelie Solja	WR 81	Margo Degraef	WR 155	Katsiaryna Baravok	WR 270	Ivana Malobabić	WR 181	Kateřina Tomanovská	WR 236	Maria Tsaptsinos	WR 199
Liu Jia	WR 92	Sara Devos	WR 1187	Darya Kisel	WR 520	Petra Petek	WR 347	Zdena Blašková	WR 513	Denise Payet	WR 357
Karoline Mischek	WR 150	Julie Van Hauwaert	NR	Vera Volkava	WR 849	Hana Arapović	WR 698	Linda Záděrová	WR 782	Charlotte Bardsley	WR 993
										Kelly Sibley	WR 1011
Spain		France		Germany		Greece		Hungary		Italy	
María Xiao	WR 70	Jia Nan Yuan	WR 90	Nina Mittelham	WR 31	Katerina Toliou	WR 144	Georgina Póta	WR 52	Debora Vivarelli	WR 71
Galia Dvorak	WR 78	Audrey Zarif	WR 133	Sabine Winter	WR 116	Konstantina Paridi	WR 266	Dóra Madarász	WR 63	Giorgia Piccolin	WR 114
Sofía-Xuan Zhang	WR 125	Pauline Chasselin	WR 162	Chantal Mantz	WR 198	Elisavet Terpou	WR 427	Mercedes Nagyváradi	WR 287	Jamila Laurenti	WR 188
Ainhoa Cristóbal	NR	Prithika Pavade	WR 381	Annett Kaufmann	WR 1037	Dimitra Tsekoura	WR 1181	Leila Imre	WR 614	Gaia Monfardini	WR 954
Luxembourg		Netherlands		Poland		Portugal		Romania		Russia	
Ni Xialian	WR 44	Sanne de Hoop	NR	Natalia Bajor	WR 91	Fu Yu	WR 47	Bernadette Szőcs	WR 24	Polina Mikhaylova	WR 45
Sarah de Nutte	WR 75	Emine Ernst	NR	Anna Węgrzyn	WR 253	Jieni Shao	WR 62	Elizabeta Samara	WR 29	Yana Noskova	WR 59
Tessy Gonderinger	WR 702	Shuohan Men	NR	Katarzyna Węgrzyn	WR 294	Rita Fins	WR 729	Daniela Monteiro Dodean	WR 108	Mariia Tailakova	WR 96
Ariel Barbosa	WR 1180	Chana van der Venne	NR	Agata Zakrzewska	WR 390	Inês Matos	WR 764	Adina Diaconu	WR 166	Olga Vorobeva	WR 109
								Andreea Dragoman	WR 255	Elizabet Abraamian	WR 276
Slovenia		Serbia		Slovakia		Sweden		Turkey		Ukraine	
Ana Tofant	WR 245	Izabela Lupulesku	WR 100	Barbora Balážová	WR 54	Linda Bergström	WR 77	Sibel Altınkaya	WR 185	Margaryta Pesotska	WR 35
Katarina Stražar	WR 304	Sabina Šurjan	WR 134	Tatiana Kukuľková	WR 139	Filippa Bergand	WR 175	Ece Haraç	WR 329	Ganna Gaponova	WR 65
Lara Opeka	WR 646	Tijana Jokić	WR 216	Nikoleta Puchovanová	WR 251	Christina Källberg	WR 182	Gül Pembe Özkaya	WR 625	Solomiya Brateyko	WR 191
Lea Paulin	WR 907	Aneta Maksuti	WR 284	Ema Labošová	WR 348	Jennifer Jonsson	WR 306	Simay Kulakçeken	NR	Veronika Hud	WR 680

=== Group stage ===
Group A

Pos	Team	Pld	W	L	Pts	Promotion	GER	SVK	ESP
1	Germany	2	2	0	4	Promote to quarterfinals	—	3–0	3–1
2	Slovakia	2	1	1	3		0–3	—	3–1
3	Spain	2	0	2	2		1–3	1–3	—

Source: euro2021tt.com

Group B

Pos	Team	Pld	W	L	Pts	Promotion	ROU	ITA	BEL
1	Romania	2	2	0	4	Promote to quarterfinals	—	3–1	3–0
2	Italy	2	1	1	3		1–3	—	3–0
3	Belgium	2	0	2	2		0–3	0–3	—

Source: euro2021tt.com

Group C

Pos	Team	Pld	W	L	Pts	Promotion	AUT	BLR	SRB
1	Austria	2	2	0	4	Promote to quarterfinals	—	3–0	3–0
2	Belarus	2	1	1	3		0–3	—	3–0
3	Serbia	2	0	2	2		0–3	0–3	—

Source: euro2021tt.com

Group D

Pos	Team	Pld	W	L	Pts	Promotion	UKR	CZE	SLO
1	Ukraine	2	2	0	4	Promote to quarterfinals	—	3–1	3–0
2	Czech Republic	2	1	1	3		1–3	—	3–1
3	Slovenia	2	0	2	2		0–3	1–3	—

Source: euro2021tt.com

Group E

Pos	Team	Pld	W	L	Pts	Promotion	POR	HUN	CRO
1	Portugal	2	2	0	4	Promote to quarterfinals	—	3–2	3–1
2	Hungary	2	1	1	3		2–3	—	3–2
3	Croatia	2	0	2	2		1–3	2–3	—

Source: euro2021tt.com

Group F

Pos	Team	Pld	W	L	Pts	Promotion	POL	SWE	ENG
1	Poland	2	2	0	4	Promote to quarterfinals	—	3–1	3–1
2	Sweden	2	1	1	3		1–3	—	3–0
3	England	2	0	2	2		1–3	0–3	—

Source: euro2021tt.com

Group G

Pos	Team	Pld	W	L	Pts	Promotion	LUX	RUS	GRE
1	Luxembourg	2	2	0	4	Promote to quarterfinals	—	3–1	3–1
2	Russia	2	1	1	3		1–3	—	3–0
3	Greece	2	0	2	2		1–3	0–3	—

Source: euro2021tt.com

Group H

Pos	Team	Pld	W	L	Pts	Promotion	FRA	NED	TUR
1	France	2	2	0	4	Promote to quarterfinals	—	0–3	3–0
2	Netherlands	2	1	1	3		3–0	—	3–2
3	Turkey	2	0	2	2		0–3	2–3	—

Source: euro2021tt.com

=== Final round ===
Quarterfinals
Germany	3
Poland	0
Portugal	3
Ukraine	1
Austria	0
France	3
Luxembourg	0
Romania	3

Semifinals
Germany	3
Portugal	1
France	0
Romania	3

Final
Germany	3
Romania	1

== See also ==
- 2021 Europe Top 16 Cup
