= Kim Song-nam =

Kim Song-nam may refer to:

- Kim Song-nam (table tennis)
- Kim Song-nam (politician)

== See also ==
- Kim Sung-nam, South Korean footballer
