= Richard Výborný =

Czech table tennis player

Personal information
- Nationality: Czech
- Born: 4 June 1971 (age 54) Chomutov, Czechoslovakia

Sport
- Sport: Table tennis

Richard Výborný (born 4 June 1971) is a Czech table tennis player. He competed in the men's doubles event at the 2004 Summer Olympics.
