= Abdel Hakim Djaziri =

Algerian table tennis player

Personal information
- Nationality: Algerian
- Born: 2 July 1981 (age 45)

Sport
- Sport: Table tennis

Abdel Hakim Djaziri (born 2 July 1981) is an Algerian and French actor and table tennis player. He competed in the men's doubles event at the 2004 Summer Olympics.
