= Komi-Mawussi Agbetoglo =

Togolese table tennis player (born 1993)

Komi-Mawussi Agbetoglo (born 24 December 1993) is a Togolese table tennis player. He competed at the 2012 Summer Olympics in the Men's singles, but was defeated in the preliminary round.
