= Hugo Hanashiro =

Brazilian table tennis player

Personal information
- Born: 8 April 1981 (age 43); São Paulo, Brazil

Sport
- Sport: Table tennis

Hugo Hanashiro (born 8 April 1981) is a Brazilian table tennis player. He competed in the men's doubles event at the 2004 Summer Olympics.
