= Faazil Kassam =

Canadian table tennis player

Personal information
- Nationality: Canadian
- Born: 5 August 1985 (age 40) Richmond, British Columbia, Canada

Sport
- Sport: Table tennis

Faazil Kassam (born 5 August 1985) is a Canadian table tennis player. He competed in the men's doubles event at the 2004 Summer Olympics.
