= Allan Bentsen =

Danish table tennis player

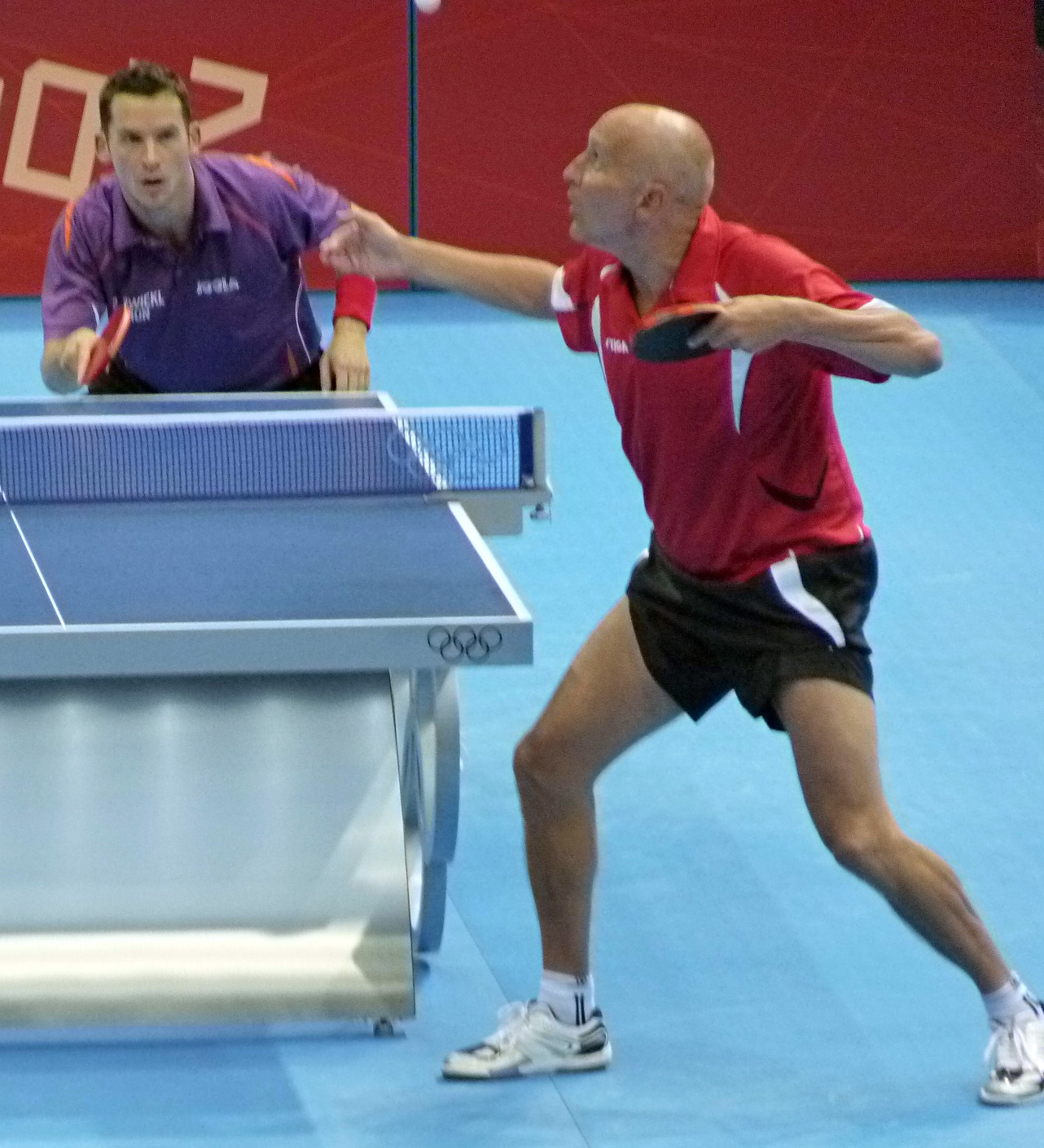
- Bentsen (right) playing against Dániel Zwickl during the 2012 Olympics

Personal information
- Born: 21 August 1968 (age 58) Odense, Denmark

Sport
- Country: Denmark
- Sport: Men's table tennis

Allan Bentsen 58 Years old (born 21 August 1968) is a Danish table tennis player. He won the European championship for national teams with Michael Maze and Finn Tugwell in 2005, defeating Zheng Weiching from Austria in the last and decisive match. He also competed at age 44 in the 2012 Summer Olympics in the Men's singles, but was defeated in the first round.
