= Lars Hielscher =

German table tennis player

Personal information
- Nationality: German
- Born: 9 May 1979 (age 45); Hanover, West Germany

Sport
- Sport: Table tennis

Lars Hielscher (born 9 May 1979) is a German table tennis player. He competed in the men's doubles event at the 2004 Summer Olympics.
