= Michael Maze =

Danish table tennis player

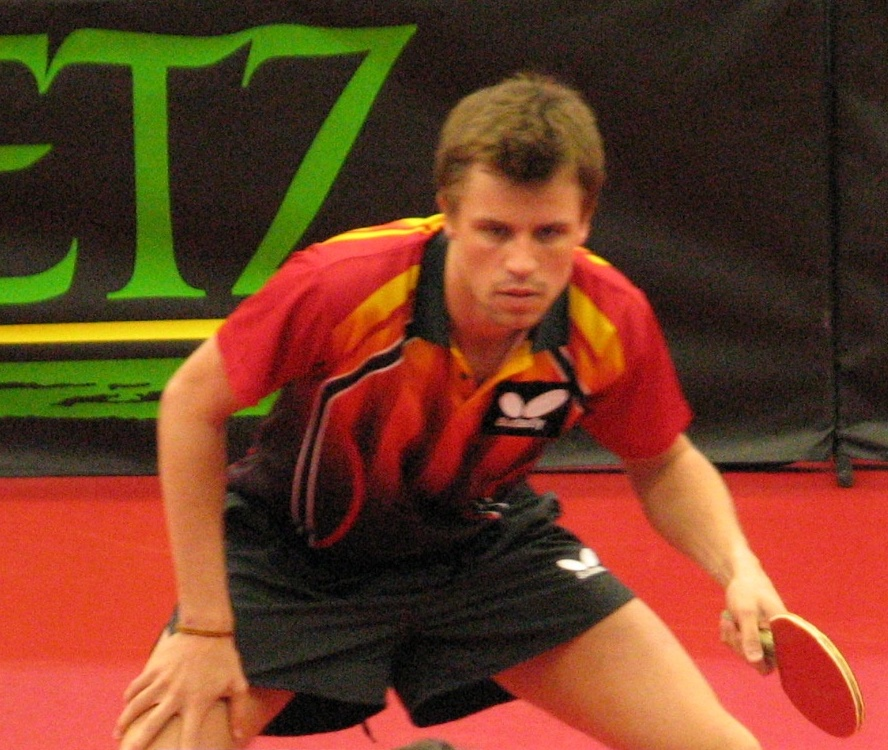

Personal information
- Full name: Michael Maze
- Nationality: Denmark
- Born: 1 September 1981 (age 44) Faxe, Denmark
- Height: 1.85 m (6 ft 1 in)
- Weight: 71 kg (157 lb)

Sport
- Sport: Table tennis
- Club: Roskilde BTK
- Playing style: Left-handed, shakehand grip
- Highest ranking: 8 (January 2010)
Medal record
Representing Denmark
Men's table tennis
Olympic Games
Bronze medal – third place	2004 Athens	Doubles
World Championships
Bronze medal – third place	2005 Shanghai	Singles
European Championships
Gold medal – first place	2005 Århus	Team
Gold medal – first place	2009 Stuttgart	Singles
Silver medal – second place	2009 Stuttgart	Team
Bronze medal – third place	2007 Belgrade	Singles

Michael Maze (born 1 September 1981) is a professional table tennis player from Faxe, Denmark, in men's singles and doubles. In 2005 he was one of the top five left-handed players in the world. His strength was in his strong forehand loop and lobbing. He was one of the best defensive lobbers in the world. His strong forehand loop, his forehand pendulum serve, and his confident defensive play away from the table made him a solid all-around player. He competed at four Olympic Games.

== Career ==
World ranking positions of Michael Maze since 2001

Maze won the European Junior Championships in both singles and doubles in 1999. He reached the quarterfinals in the European Championships for seniors in both series in 2003 playing doubles with Finn Tugwell. Tugwell and Maze participated as partners at the 2000 Summer Olympics where they reached the round of 16. Before the 2004 Summer Olympics, Maze won the Europe Top-12 tournament in Frankfurt am Main in February 2004. He participated both in men's singles and men's doubles in the 2004 Olympics. Maze lost his first match in singles but won bronze with his partner Finn Tugwell.

Another of Maze's achievements was reaching the semifinals of the 2005 World Championships that took place in Shanghai, China, in which he was defeated by the home favorite, Ma Lin, in a swift 4–0 match. Nevertheless, he had managed to put up a memorable performance in the quarterfinals of the competition, coming back from a 3–0 deficit to win 4–3 against another Chinese player, Hao Shuai, saving 3 match points, as well as a win in the previous match against 2004 Olympics Men's singles silver medallist Wang Hao, again from the host nation. Michael Maze won the prize "BT Gold" as the biggest Danish sportsperson in 2005.

Maze won European bronze in singles in 2007. In 2009, Maze had reached the quarterfinals of 2009 World Table Tennis Championships, held in Yokohama, Japan. He was the only European player to achieve the quarters, beating Greek player Panagiotis Gionis at last 16 Round. On 20 September 2009 he defeated Werner Schlager in the final of the European Championships held in Stuttgart, Germany after defeating the German player Timo Boll in the semis.

Maze (representing Denmark) was defeated during the 2012 Olympics by Dimitrij Ovtcharov (representing Germany) in the Men's Singles Quarter Final. His coach is the former Chinese National Team Coach Hu Wei Xin.

On 14 March 2016, Michael Maze announced the end of his Table Tennis career. He was hoping to compete at the 2016 Rio Summer Olympics.

Maze announced his retirement in 2016, saying "after several operations I can no longer train one hundred per cent without pain and therefore not compete at the level I’m used to."

In February 2018, Maze announced his return to competitive sport.
