= Irvin Bertrand =

French table tennis player (born 2000)

Personal information
- Born: 6 February 2000 (age 26) Suresnes, France

Sport
- Sport: Table tennis
- Playing style: Left-handed
- Highest ranking: 171 (December 2024)
- Current ranking: 171 (December 2024)
Medal record
Bronze medal – third place	U21 European Championships	Single

Irvin Bertrand (born 6 February 2000) is a French table tennis player.

== Career ==
In 2017, Irvin impressed judges at the 2017 Europe Youth Top 10 competition with his victories.

In 2018, during the 2018 World Junior Championships in Bendigo, Australia, Irvin, with the help of fellow French table tennis player Leo de Nodrest, defeated Xu Yingbin and Yu Heyi, which was the first defeat experienced by any male Chinese player in the whole tournament.

In 2021, Irvin won the bronze medal at the European Under-21 Table Tennis Championships in Spa, Belgium.
