= Peter Akinlabi =

Nigerian table tennis player

Personal information
- Nationality: Nigeria
- Born: 28 August 1973 (age 53) Lagos, Nigeria
- Height: 168 cm (5 ft 6 in)
- Weight: 59 kg (130 lb)

Sport
- Sport: Table tennis

Peter Akinlabi (born 28 August 1973) is a Nigerian table tennis player. He competed in the 2000 and 2004 Summer Olympics.
