= Vallot Vainula =

Estonian table tennis player

Vallot Vainula (born 14 May 1978) is an Estonian table tennis player.

He was born in Pärnu. In 2004 he graduated from Tallinn University of Technology's Faculty of Building.

He began his table tennis career in 1984, coached by Enn Hallik. Later his coaches have been Antti Luigemaa, Christian Grigore Benone and others. He is played at World Table Tennis Championships. He is 7-times Baltic champion, and multiple-times Estonian champion.

Since 2010 he is the head coach of Estonian national table tennis team.

2002-2002, 2004–2006, 2011, 2014-2016 and 2019-2021 he is named as Best Male Table Tennis Player of Estonia.
