= Kim Song-nam (table tennis) =

North Korean table tennis player

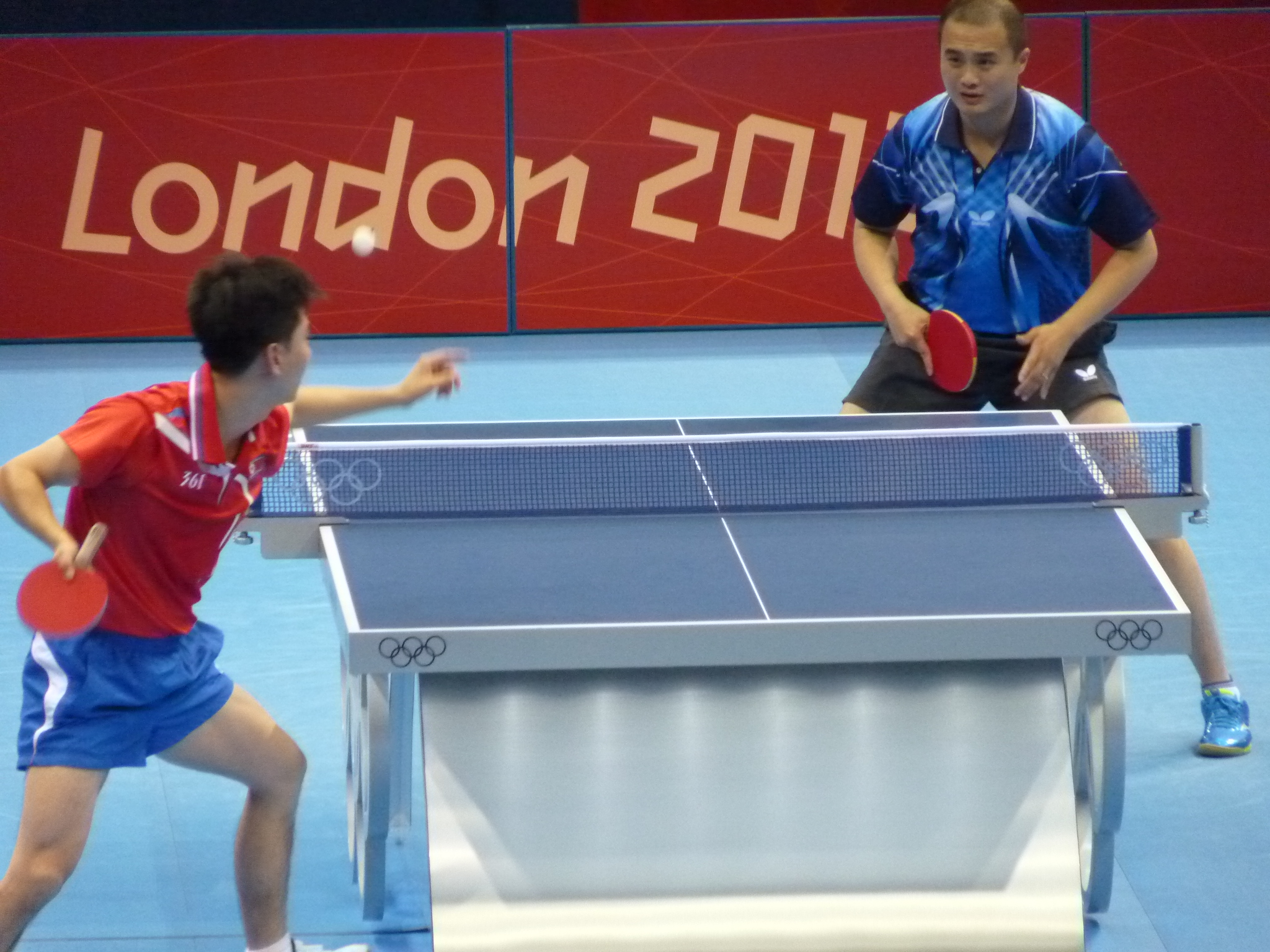
- Kim Song-nam (left) playing against Lin Ju

Personal information
- Nationality: North Korea

Korean name
- Hangul: 김성남
- RR: Gim Seongnam
- MR: Kim Sŏngnam

Sport
- Sport: Table tennis

Kim Song-nam (Korean: 김성남) is a North Korean table tennis player. He competed at the 2012 Summer Olympics in the Men's singles, but was defeated in the first round.
