= Shu Arai =

Chinese-born table tennis player (born 1975)

Shu Arai (Japanese: 新井 周, Hepburn: Arai Shū, born Zhou Xuan [Chinese: 周晅; pinyin: Zhōu Xuǎn] on 9 January 1975) is a Chinese-born table tennis player who represented Japan at the 2004 Summer Olympics.
