= Georgeta Cojocaru =

Romanian table tennis player

Personal information
- Nationality: Romanian
- Born: 11 March 1975 (age 50); Slatina, Romania

Sport
- Sport: Table tennis

Georgeta Cojocaru (born 11 March 1975) is a Romanian table tennis player. She competed in the women's doubles event at the 1996 Summer Olympics.
