= Finn Tugwell =

Danish table tennis player

Personal information
- Full name: Finn Tugwell
- Nationality: Danish
- Born: 18 March 1976 (age 50) Aarhus, Denmark
- Height: 1.78 m (5 ft 10 in)
- Weight: 66 kg (146 lb)

Sport
- Sport: Table tennis
- Club: Roskilde BTK
- Playing style: Right-handed, shakehand grip
Medal record
Men's table tennis
Representing Denmark
Olympic Games
| Bronze medal – third place | 2004 Athens | Doubles |
European Championships
| Gold medal – first place | 2005 Aarhus | Team |
| Silver medal – second place | 2009 Stuttgart | Team |

Finn Tugwell (born 18 March 1976) is a Danish table tennis player who currently plays for Roskilde BTK. He paired up with Danish Michael Maze in doubles, with whom he won the bronze medal at the 2004 Summer Olympics, beating the Russian pair Dmitry Mazunov/Alexey Smirnov.

His highest world ranking was 65th in October 2004.

== Forgery ==
In 2009, Finn Tugwell was given a suspended 40 day prison sentence for document forgery. He had been driving around with a parking card for the disabled in his window that he wasn't eligible for. While in court, Finn explained that he had picked up the sign and put it in his window temporarily because he wanted to find some place to hand it in.
