= Martin Monrad =

Danish table tennis player

Personal information
- Full name: MONRAD Martin
- Nationality: Denmark

Sport
- Sport: Table tennis
Medal record
Men's table tennis
Representing Denmark
European Championships
Silver medal – second place	2009 Stuttgart	Team
Gold medal – first place	2005 Aarhus	Team

Martin Monrad (born 1977) is a male table tennis player from Denmark. From 2005 he won some medals in team events in the Table Tennis European Championships.
