= Ioannis Sgouropoulos =

Greek table tennis player

Ioánnis Sgourópoulos
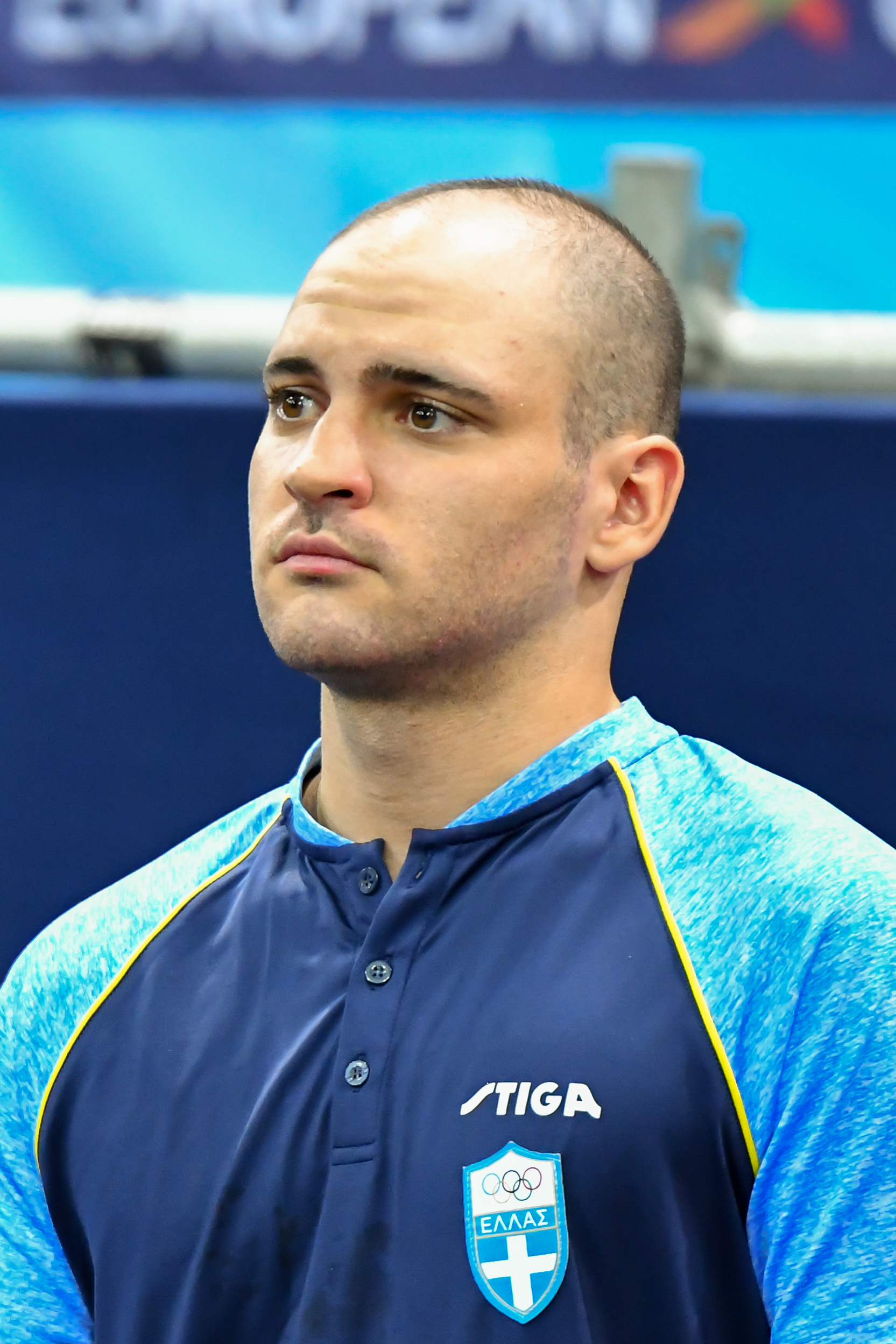

Personal information
- Born: 8 May 2000 (age 26) Athena, Greece
- Height: 172 cm (5 ft 8 in)

Sport
- Sport: Table tennis
- Playing style: Right-handed shakehand
- Highest ranking: 147 (17 August 2023)
- Current ranking: 228 (9 April 2024)
Medal record
Men's table tennis
Representing Greece
Mediterranean Games
Bronze medal – third place	2022 Oran	Team
European Youth Championships
Gold medal – first place	2017 Guimarães	Single
Gold medal – first place	2018 Cluj-Napoca	Single
European U-21 Championships
Gold medal – first place	2019 Gondomar	Single
Gold medal – first place	2021 Spa	Single

Ioánnis Yiánnis Sgourópoulos (born 8 May 2000) is a Greek table tennis player.

== Biography ==
Ioannis Sgouropoulos discovered table tennis through his father. He played football when he was younger but gave up at 10 or 11 to become a professional table tennis player.

He won two consecutive European youth table tennis championships in 2017 and 2018. He also won two gold medals at the European U-21 table tennis championships in men's singles event.
