= Dániel Zwickl =

Hungarian table tennis player (born 1984)

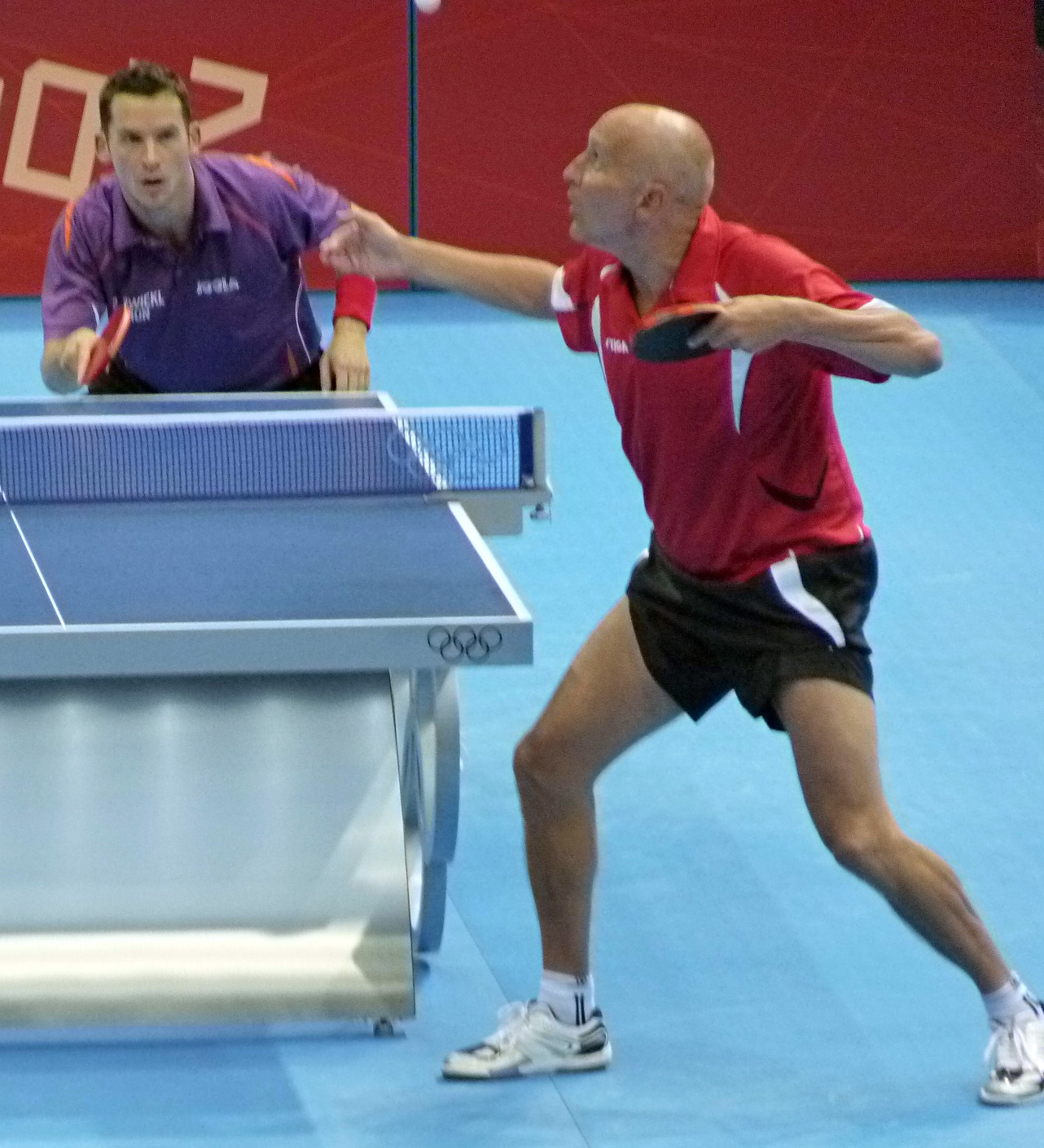
Dániel Zwickl (left) playing against Allan Bentsen during the 2012 Olympics.

Dániel Zwickl (born 30 August 1984 in Budapest) is a Hungarian table tennis player. He competed at the 2012 Summer Olympics in the Men's singles, but was defeated in the third round.
