= Danny Heister =

Dutch table tennis player

Danny Heister (born 18 November 1971 in Zevenaar) is a Dutch professional table tennis player.

== Career highlights ==
Summer Olympic Games
1996, Atlanta, men's singles, 1st round
1996, Atlanta, men's doubles, 1st round
2000, Sydney, men's singles, last 32
2000, Sydney, men's doubles, last 16
2004, Athens, men's singles, last 64
2004, Athens, men's doubles, last 16
World Championships
1991, Chiba, mixed doubles, last 32
1993, Gothenburg, men's doubles, last 16
1995, Tianjin, men's doubles, last 16
1997, Manchester, men's doubles, last 16
1999, Eindhoven, men's singles, last 32
1999, Eindhoven, men's doubles, last 16
2000, Kuala Lumpur, team competition, 5th-8th
2001, Osaka, men's singles, last 32
2001, Osaka, men's doubles, last 32
2005, Shanghai, men's singles, last 32
2005, Shanghai, men's doubles, last 16
2005, Shanghai, mixed doubles, last 32
Pro Tour Grand Finals
1997, Hong Kong, men's singles, last 16
1997, Hong Kong, men's doubles, quarter final
2002, Stockholm, men's singles, quarter final
Pro Tour Meetings
1997, Kettering, men's doubles, runner-up (silver)
1997, Lyon, men's singles, runner-up (silver)
1997, Lyon, men's doubles, runner-up (silver)
1999, Hopton-on-Sea, men's doubles, winner (gold)
1999, Rio de Janeiro, men's doubles, semi final
2000, Kobe, men's doubles, semi final
2000, Toulouse, men's doubles, semi final
2001, Bayreuth, men's doubles, semi final
2002, Fort Lauderdale, men's doubles, semi final
2002, Magdeburg, men's doubles, semi final
2002, Warsaw, men's doubles, semi final
European Championships
1994, Birmingham, men's singles, last 16
1998, Eindhoven, men's singles, quarter final
2002, Zagreb, men's doubles, semi final
2005, Aarhus, mixed doubles, quarter final
European Youth Championships
1989, Kockelscheuer, men's singles, semi final
European Top-12 Championships
2000, Alassio, 5th
2002, Rotterdam, 5th
2003, Saarbrücken, 5th
