= Trinko Keen =

Dutch table tennis player

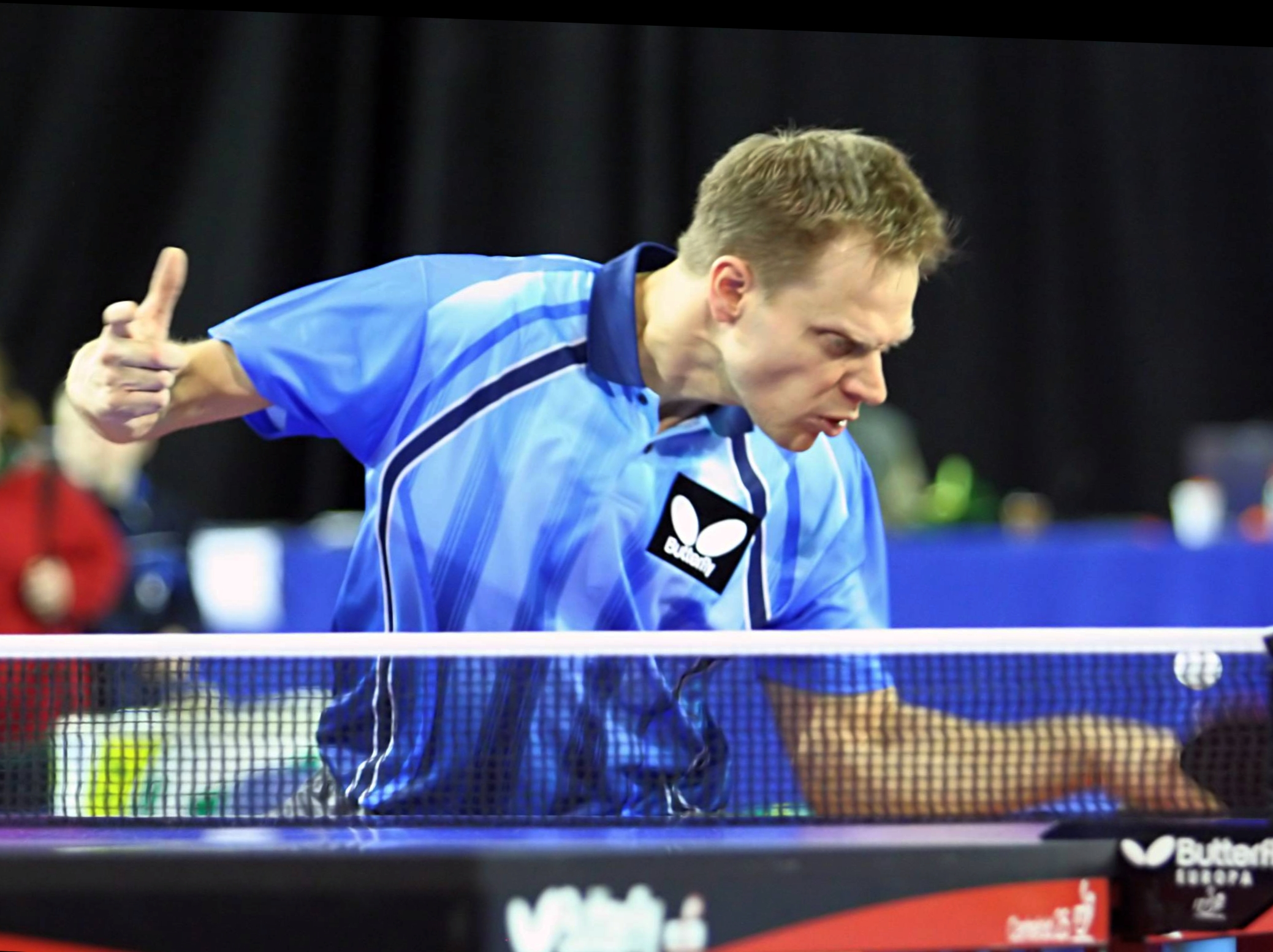
Trinko Keen 2007 in Eindhoven

Trinko Keen (born 22 September 1971, Wageningen) is a Dutch professional table tennis player. He is the younger brother of Gerdie Keen.

== Career highlights ==
Summer Olympic Games
1996, Atlanta, men's doubles, 1st round
2000, Sydney, men's singles, last 32
2000, Sydney, men's doubles, last 16
2004, Athens, men's singles, last 32
2004, Athens, men's doubles, last 16
World Championships
1993, Gothenburg, men's singles, last 32
1993, Gothenburg, men's doubles, last 16
1995, Tianjin, men's doubles, last 16
1995, Tianjin, mixed doubles, last 16
1997, Manchester, men's doubles, last 16
1999, Eindhoven, men's doubles, last 16
2001, Osaka, men's doubles, last 32
2003, Paris, men's singles, last 32
2005, Shanghai, men's singles, last 32
2005, Shanghai, men's doubles, last 16
2007, Zagreb, mixed doubles, last 32
World Team Cup:
1990, Hokkaido, 5th
Pro Tour Grand Finals
1997, Hong Kong, men's doubles, quarter final
2001, Hainan, men's singles, quarter final
Pro Tour Meetings
1997, Kettering, men's doubles, runner-up (silver)
1997, Lyon, men's doubles, runner-up (silver)
1999, Hopton-on-Sea, men's doubles, winner (gold)
1999, Zagreb, men's doubles, semi final
1999, Rio de Janeiro, men's doubles, semi final
1999, Linz, men's doubles, semi final
2000, Kobe, men's doubles, semi final
2001, São Paulo, men's singles, semi final
2001, São Paulo, men's doubles, runner-up (silver)
2001, Seoul, men's doubles, semi final
2001, Bayreuth, men's doubles, semi final
2002, Wels, men's singles, semi final
2002, Fort Lauderdale, men's doubles, semi final
2002, Magdeburg, men's doubles, semi final
2002, Warsaw, men's doubles, semi final
2003, Rio de Janeiro, men's singles, semi final
2004, Cairo, men's doubles, semi final
2004, Aarhus, men's doubles, semi final
2004, Leipzig, men's singles, semi final
European Championships
1992, Stuttgart, mixed doubles, quarter final
1998, Eindhoven, men's singles, semi final
2000, Bremen, men's singles, last 16
2002, Zagreb, men's singles, last 16
2002, Zagreb, men's doubles, semi final
2003, Courmayeur, men's singles, last 16
2005, Aarhus, men's doubles, quarter final
European Top-12 Championships
1996, Charleroi, 9th
1997, Eindhoven, 11th
2000, Alassio, 10th
2002, Rotterdam, 9th
2003, Saarbrücken, 9th
2005, Rennes, 9th
