= Tomasz Krzeszewski =

Polish table tennis player

Personal information
- Nationality: Polish
- Born: 19 September 1974 (age 50); Zgierz, Poland

Sport
- Sport: Table tennis

Tomasz Krzeszewski (born 19 September 1974) is a Polish table tennis player. He competed at the 2000 Summer Olympics and the 2004 Summer Olympics.
