= Chantal Mantz =

German table tennis player

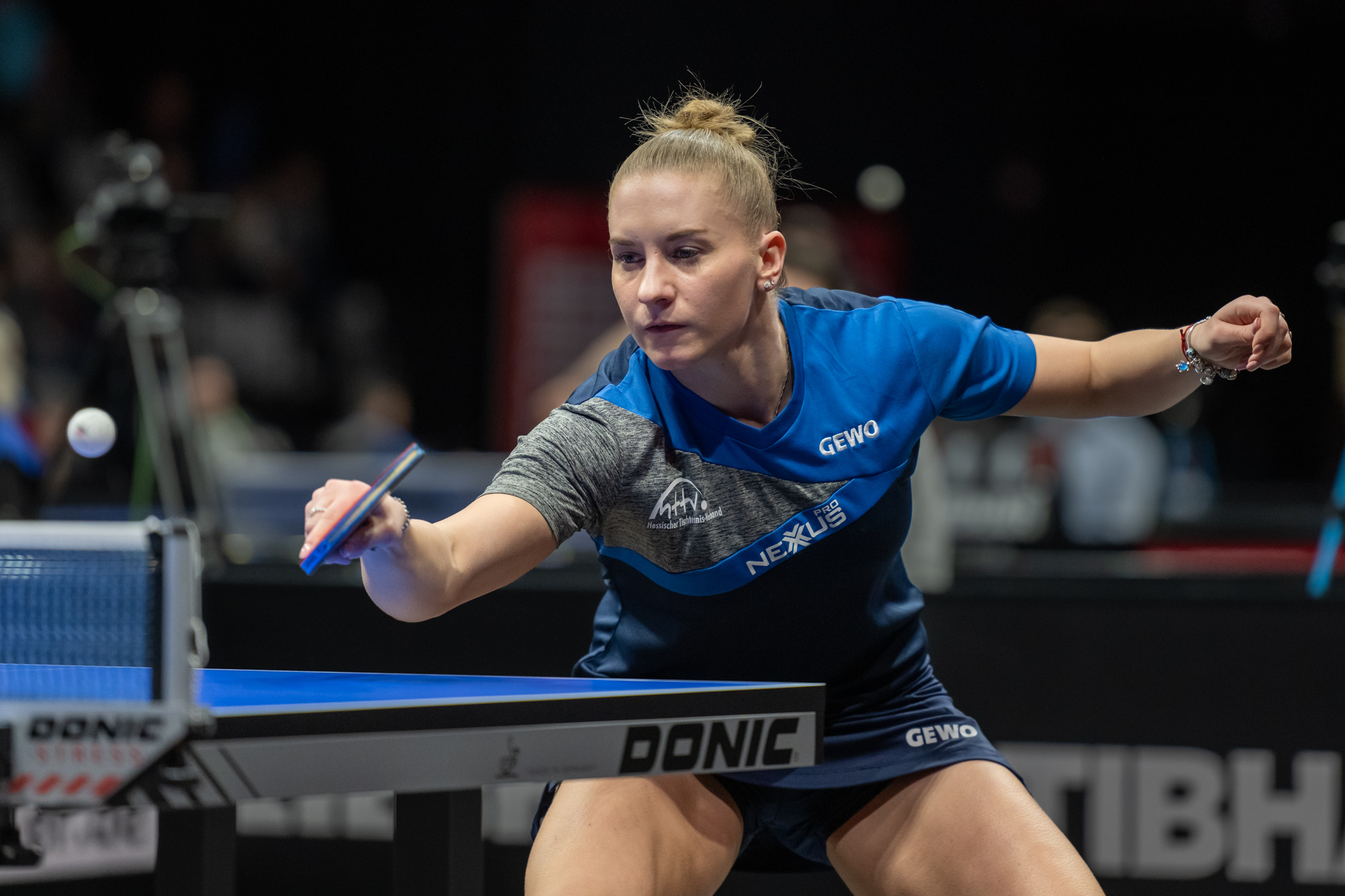
- Chantal Mantz (2023)

Personal information
- Born: 26 June 1996 (age 30) Dieburg, Germany
Medal record
Women's table tennis
Representing Germany
European Championships
Gold medal – first place	2021 Warsaw	Team

Chantal Mantz (born 26 June 1996) is a German table tennis player. She won European U-21 singles title in 2017. She is a member of German women's team winning gold at the 2021 European Table Tennis Championships. As of April 2023, her highest career ITTF ranking was 111.
