= Lucjan Błaszczyk =

Polish table tennis player (born 1974)

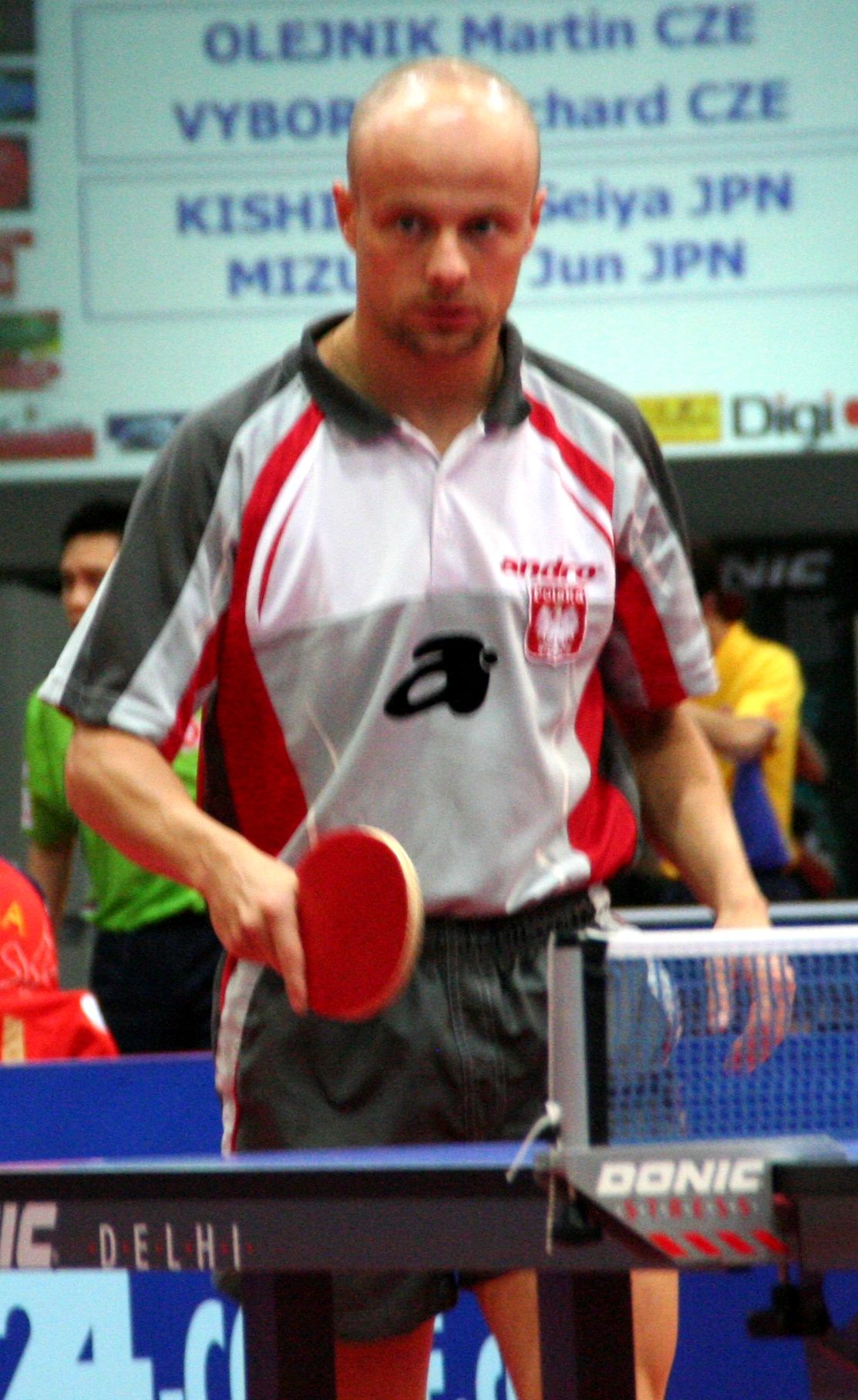
Lucjan Błaszczyk

Lucjan Błaszczyk (born 28 December 1974 in Lwówek Śląski) is a Polish table tennis player. He competed for Poland at the Olympic Games in Atlanta, Sydney, Athens and Beijing.
