= 2009 World Table Tennis Championships – Men's singles =

Men's singles at the 2009 World Table Tennis Championships
- Venue: Yokohama Arena
- Location: Yokohama, Japan
- Dates: 28 April – 5 May
- Final score: 11–9, 13–11, 11–5, 11–9

Medalists
gold medal	Wang Hao	China
silver medal	Wang Liqin	China
bronze medal	Ma Long	China
bronze medal	Ma Lin	China

== Seeds ==
1. (China) Wang Hao (world champion)
2. (China) Ma Lin (semifinals)
3. (China) Ma Long (semifinals)
4. (China) Wang Liqin (final)
5. (Belarus) Vladimir Samsonov (second round)
6. (China) Chen Qi (quarterfinals)
7. (South Korea) Joo Se Hyuk (quarterfinals)
8. (Chinese Taipei) Chuang Chih-Yuan (second round)
9. (South Korea) Ryu Seung Min (second round)
10. (South Korea) Oh Sang Eun (second round)
11. (Hong Kong) Li Ching (fourth round)
12. (Hong Kong) Cheung Yuk(fourth round)
13. (Germany) Dimitrij Ovtcharov (fourth round)
14. (Denmark) Michael Maze (quarterfinals)
15. (Sweden) Jörgen Persson (third round)
16. (Hong Kong) Jiang Tianyi (fourth round)
17. (Croatia) Zoran Primorac (third round)
18. (Japan) Jun Mizutani (fourth round)
19. (Japan) Kan Yo (second round)
20. (Singapore) Gao Ning (second round)
21. (Austria) Chen Weixing (first round)
22. (Germany) Christian Süß (third round)
23. (Hong Kong) Ko Lai Chak (third round)
24. (Austria) Robert Gardos (third round)
25. (Hong Kong) Tang Peng (fourth round)
26. (Romania) Adrian Crisan (first round)
27. (Croatia) Tan Ruiwu (first round, retired)
28. (Chinese Taipei) Chiang Peng-Lung (first round)
29. (Japan) Kaii Yoshida (quarterfinals)
30. (Germany) Bastian Steger (second round)
31. (China) Zhang Chao (third round)
32. (Czech Republic) Petr Korbel (second round)

== Final Rounds ==
Quarterfinals
1	(China) Wang Hao	11	11	8	11	11
29	(Japan) Kaii Yoshida	9	8	11	3	4
14	(Denmark) Michael Maze	10	11	7	9
3	(China) Ma Long	12	13	11	11
4	(China) Wang Liqin	8	11	11	10	8	11	11
6	(China) Chen Qi	11	4	6	12	11	5	8
7	(South Korea) Joo Se-Hyuk	4	4	11	8	11	8
2	(China) Ma Lin	11	11	9	11	9	11

Semifinals
1	(China) Wang Hao	12	11	10	11	11
3	(China) Ma Long	10	8	12	9	9
4	(China) Wang Liqin	11	12	11	7	11	6	11
2	(China) Ma Lin	5	14	9	11	9	11	6

Final
1	(China) Wang Hao	11	13	11	11
4	(China) Wang Liqin	9	11	5	9

== Early Rounds ==
=== Section 1 ===
First Round
1	(China) H Wang	11	11	11	11
16	(Turkey) C Zeng	5	5	5	5
Q	(Austria) B Presslmayer	9	5	5	8
9	(France) C Legout	11	11	11	11
5	(Slovakia) T Keinath	11	11	11	12
12	(Romania) A Filimon	7	9	4	10
4	(Italy) M Yang	6	11	9	10	10
32	(Czech Republic) P Korbel	11	7	11	12	12
22	(Germany) C Suss	11	13	11	12
11	(Australia) W Henzell	9	11	9	10
3	(Japan) H Oya	19	3	11	11	11
14	(Nigeria) S Toriola	17	11	8	5	5
7	(Brazil) T Monteiro	7	13	9	11	11	8	11
Q	(Argentina) G Alto	11	11	11	7	8	11	6
Q	(Czech Republic) A Gavlas	7	11	11	9	12	9	7
16	(Hong Kong) T Jiang	11	6	8	11	10	11	11

Second Round
1	(China) H Wang	11	11	11	11
(France) C Legout	6	6	5	8
(Slovakia) T Keinath	11	11	13	11	15
32	(Czech Republic) P Korbel	5	8	15	6	13
22	(Germany) C Suss	11	11	11	11
(Japan) H Oya	9	9	5	9
(Brazil) T Monteiro	9	8	7	9
16	(Hong Kong) T Jiang	11	11	11	11

Third Round
1	(China) H Wang	6	11	11	11	11
(Slovakia) T Keinath	11	9	5	9	6
22	(Germany) C Suss	11	11	10	11	7	11	9
16	(Hong Kong) T Jiang	6	13	12	7	11	6	11

Fourth Round
1	(China) H Wang	9	8	11	11	11	11
16	(Hong Kong) T Jiang	11	11	4	8	9	6

=== Section 2 ===
First Round
9	(South Korea) S-M Ryu	11	11	14	11
16	(Czech Republic) L Jancarik	6	9	12	8
8	(Poland) J Kosowski	4	10	11	8	10
9	(Slovenia) B Tokič	11	12	9	11	12
5	(Portugal) J Monteiro	11	11	11	9	14
Q	(Greece) K Papageorgiou	9	7	3	11	12
4	(France) E Lebesson	12	8	7	12	11	10	5
29	(Japan) K Yoshida	10	11	11	10	9	12	11
31	(China) C Zhang	11	11	9	11	11
Q	(Russia) M Paykov	6	3	11	4	4
Q	(Czech Republic) J Kleprlik	5	8	7	6
14	(Poland) L Błaszczyk	11	11	11	11
7	(South Korea) J-H Kim	11	11	11	11
10	(Austria) D Habesohn	2	6	2	4
2	(Brazil) H Hoyama	8	5	6	9
5	(Belarus) V Samsonov	11	11	11	11

Second Round
9	(South Korea) S-M Ryu	12	11	8	5	6
(Slovenia) B Tokič	14	8	11	11	11
(Portugal) J Monteiro	4	9	10	10
29	(Japan) K Yoshida	11	11	12	12
31	(China) C Zhang	11	12	8	11	11
(Poland) L Błaszczyk	6	10	11	6	8
(South Korea) J-H Kim	6	11	12	11	11
5	(Belarus) V Samsonov	11	5	10	5	7

Third Round
(Slovenia) B Tokič	4	9	11	7
29	(Japan) K Yoshida	11	11	13	11
31	(China) C Zhang	11	11	8	12	5	5	11
(South Korea) J-H Kim	6	7	11	10	11	11	13

Fourth Round
29	(Japan) K Yoshida	11	11	4	11	7	11
(South Korea) J-H Kim	6	5	11	5	11	5

=== Section 3 ===
First Round
8	(Chinese Taipei) C-Y Chuang	11	11	12	7	7	11
16	(Turkey) B Vang	3	4	10	11	11	8
Q	(Portugal) A Silva	9	7	8	13
9	(Greece) P Gionis	11	11	11	15
5	(India) S Kamal	11	11	8	8	11	12
12	(Norway) J Wang	2	6	11	11	5	10
Q	(Mexico) M Madrid	7	7	11	6	8
30	(Germany) B Steger	11	11	9	11	11
19	(Japan) Y Kan	11	11	11	11
Q	(Serbia) M Jevtović	7	6	7	8
3	(Serbia) S Grujić	9	11	7	10	9
14	(Croatia) A Gacina	11	9	11	12	11
7	(Sweden) J Lundqvist	8	12	7	7	11	4
10	(Chinese Taipei) H-C Chuang	11	10	11	11	7	11
2	(South Korea) J-K Lee	4	3	7	4
14	(Denmark) M Maze	11	11	11	11

Second Round
8	(Chinese Taipei) C-Y Chuang	6	11	11	7	11	6	5
(Greece) P Gionis	11	9	5	11	9	11	11
(India) S Kamal	11	11	11	6	11
30	(Germany) B Steger	8	9	3	11	8
19	(Japan) Y Kan	10	11	11	12	3	7
(Croatia) A Gacina	12	5	9	14	11	11
(Chinese Taipei) H-C Chuang	11	11	5	5	7
14	(Denmark) M Maze	13	7	11	11	11

Third Round
(Greece) P Gionis	10	11	13	11	11	11
(India) S Kamal	12	9	11	13	8	8
(Croatia) A Gacina	12	8	9	3	10
14	(Denmark) M Maze	10	11	11	11	12

Fourth Round
(Greece) P Gionis	11	7	11	8	8
14	(Denmark) M Maze	13	11	4	11	11

=== Section 4 ===
First Round
13	(Germany) D Ovtcharov	6	11	11	11	10	14
16	(Ukraine) L Kou	11	5	5	4	12	12
Q	(Japan) K Niwa	11	9	11	11	11
9	(Argentina) S Liu	6	11	5	6	8
5	(Belgium) J-M Saive	9	11	8	12	6	13	11
12	(Egypt) A Saleh	11	9	11	10	11	11	8
Q	(Chinese Taipei) C-A Chen	4	4	7	4
23	(Hong Kong) L Ko	11	11	11	11
17	(Croatia) Z Primorac	4	11	1	11	11	11	13
11	(England) P Drinkhall	11	13	11	4	4	8	11
Q	(Israel) I Abramov	4	6	7	3
14	(Hungary) J Jakab	11	11	11	11
7	(Poland) Z Wang	11	4	12	11	11
Q	(Latvia) M Burgis	6	11	10	6	8
Q	(Serbia) Ž Pete	7	8	4	5
3	(China) L Ma	11	11	11	11

Second Round
13	(Germany) D Ovtcharov	7	11	11	11	10	11
Q	(Japan) K Niwa	11	7	7	9	12	8
(Belgium) J-M Saive	3	7	9	11	5
23	(Hong Kong) L Ko	11	11	11	9	11
17	(Croatia) Z Primorac	11	5	11	12	9	11
(Hungary) J Jakab	6	11	6	10	11	8
(Poland) Z Wang	11	1	6	2	6
3	(China) L Ma	9	11	11	11	11

Third Round
13	(Germany) D Ovtcharov	8	11	9	5	12	11	11
23	(Hong Kong) L Ko	11	6	11	11	10	8	7
17	(Croatia) Z Primorac	10	12	2	4
3	(China) L Ma	12	14	11	11

Fourth Round
13	(Germany) D Ovtcharov	2	11	2	4	8
3	(China) L Ma	11	7	11	11	11

=== Section 5 ===
First Round
4	(China) L Wang	11	12	11	11
Q	(Poland) A Daniel	4	10	3	2
8	(Japan) K Matsudaira	8	11	8	11	13	16
9	(Russia) F Kuzmin	11	5	11	8	11	14
5	(France) A Mattenet	12	12	11	11
Q	(Italy) S Tomasi	10	10	8	6
Q	(Austria) S Fegerl	12	8	7	11	11	11	11
26	(Romania) A Crişan	10	11	11	8	13	6	9
25	(Hong Kong) P Tang	11	9	11	11	11
Q	(Belgium) B Rogiers	9	11	3	2	5
Q	(Belarus) V Nekhvedovich	11	12	5	14	9
14	(Russia) I Rubtsov	8	14	11	16	11
7	(Italy) M Bobocica	12	4	11	7	11	7
Q	(Iceland) G Stephensen	10	11	9	11	13	11
Q	(Ukraine) Y Zhmudenko	12	8	8	4	9
11	(Hong Kong) C Li	10	11	11	11	11

Second Round
4	(China) L Wang	11	14	11	9	11
(Japan) K Matsudaira	7	12	5	11	8
(France) A Mattenet	11	11	14	10	11
Q	(Austria) S Fegerl	8	2	12	12	7
25	(Hong Kong) P Tang	5	11	8	11	11	7	15
(Russia) I Rubtsov	11	8	11	2	6	11	13
Q	(Iceland) G Stephensen	7	6	7	9
11	(Hong Kong) C Li	11	11	11	11

Third Round
4	(China) L Wang	11	11	12	5	8	11
(France) A Mattenet	5	9	10	11	11	5
25	(Hong Kong) P Tang	11	9	11	11	11
11	(Hong Kong) C Li	9	11	9	6	7

Fourth Round
4	(China) L Wang	11	8	11	11	8	15
25	(Hong Kong) P Tang	3	11	6	6	11	13

=== Section 6 ===
First Round
15	(Sweden) J Persson	11	5	11	11	11
16	(Slovakia) P Sereda	9	11	9	6	8
8	(Sweden) R Svensson	11	8	11	11	11	5	12
9	(Romania) C Cioti	5	11	2	7	13	11	10
5	(Singapore) Z Yang	11	7	11	11	4	11	7
Q	(Thailand) P Sanguansin	6	11	8	13	11	6	11
4	(Ukraine) A Didukh	7	9	6	10
18	(Japan) J Mizutani	11	11	11	12
20	(Singapore) N Gao	3	11	11	11	11
11	(Spain) C Machado	11	8	9	6	6
Q	(Thailand) P Sanguansin	4	7	9	7
14	(China) X Xu	11	11	11	11
7	(Russia) K Skachkov	11	9	11	11	5	11
Q	(Iran) M Ahadi	8	11	6	8	11	5
Q	(Iran) M Akhlaghpasand	9	2	5	7
6	(China) Q Chen	11	11	11	11

Second Round
15	(Sweden) J Persson	11	13	11	11
(Sweden) R Svensson	7	11	9	8
Q	(Thailand) P Sanguansin	5	8	8	3
18	(Japan) J Mizutani	11	11	11	11
20	(Singapore) N Gao	8	5	7	6
(China) X Xu	11	11	11	11
(Russia) K Skachkov	7	3	9	11	13	9
6	(China) Q Chen	11	11	11	9	11	11

Third Round
15	(Sweden) J Persson	11	4	10	9
18	(Japan) J Mizutani	13	11	12	11
(China) X Xu	9	6	11	11	12	8	9
6	(China) Q Chen	11	11	9	8	10	11	11

Fourth Round
18	(Japan) J Mizutani	6	3	10	4
6	(China) Q Chen	11	11	12	11

=== Section 7 ===
First Round
7	(South Korea) S-H Joo	11	11	11	11
16	(Egypt) E Lashin	8	8	6	8
8	(Brazil) G Tsuboi	12	3	5	10	6
9	(Germany) P Baum	10	11	11	12	11
5	(Chinese Taipei) C-C Wu	1	11	11	11	11
12	(Brazil) C Matsumoto	11	5	4	6	9
Q	(Slovakia) E Illas
27	(Croatia) R Tan	r
28	(Chinese Taipei) P-L Chiang	11	11	11	11
Q	(Spain) M Duran	3	7	5	9
Q	(South Korea) H-D Seo	11	11	9	12	12
14	(Sweden) P Gerell	4	7	11	10	10
7	(Portugal) M Freitas	11	11	11	11
Q	(Croatia) R Redjep	5	8	3	6
Q	(Vietnam) K Q Doan	8	16	3	5
12	(Hong Kong) Y Cheung	11	18	11	11

Second Round
7	(South Korea) S-H Joo	11	8	5	12	11	11
(Germany) P Baum	9	11	11	10	6	8
(Chinese Taipei) C-C Wu	10	12	5	11	10	8
Q	(Slovakia) E Illas	12	10	11	4	12	11
28	(Chinese Taipei) P-L Chiang	6	11	7	8	11	5
Q	(South Korea) H-D Seo	11	9	11	11	6	11
(Portugal) M Freitas	11	6	9	9	4
12	(Hong Kong) Y Cheung	9	11	11	11	11

Third Round
7	(South Korea) S-H Joo	11	11	11	11
Q	(Slovakia) E Illas	9	9	5	8
Q	(South Korea) H-D Seo	11	5	11	5	4	8
12	(Hong Kong) Y Cheung	7	11	7	11	11	11

Fourth Round
7	(South Korea) S-H Joo	11	6	11	11
12	(Hong Kong) Y Cheung	5	11	7	6	r

=== Section 8 ===
First Round
10	(South Korea) S-E Oh	10	13	11	11	11	11
16	(Slovakia) L Pistej	12	11	13	6	8	7
8	(Japan) K Matsudaira	11	13	11	11
9	(Serbia) A Karakašević	6	11	5	3
5	(Germany) Z Fejer-Konnerth	11	9	11	12	11
Q	(Scotland) G Rumgay	6	11	9	10	7
Q	(Bulgaria) T Yordanov	11	4	5	7	5
24	(Austria) R Gardos	9	11	11	11	11
21	(Austria) W Chen	9	11	9	11	6	5
11	(Portugal) T Apolónia	11	7	11	4	11	11
3	(Croatia) R Tošić	4	11	6	11	11	11
14	(Dominican Republic) J Lin	11	3	11	3	4	6
7	(Spain) Z He	11	16	9	11	11
10	(Singapore) X Cai	7	14	11	4	8
2	(Spain) A Carneros	6	8	11	11	2	2
2	(China) L Ma	11	11	9	7	11	11

Second Round
10	(South Korea) S-E Oh	4	11	12	5	11	7	8
(Japan) K Matsudaira	11	6	10	11	8	11	11
(Germany) Z Fejer-Konnerth	11	14	6	7	10
24	(Austria) R Gardos	8	16	11	11	12
(Portugal) T Apolónia	7	7	11	3	11	11	11
(Croatia) R Tošić	11	11	9	11	7	8	8
(Spain) Z He	7	4	4	5
2	(China) L Ma	11	11	11	11

Third Round
(Japan) K Matsudaira	11	11	9	11	8	11
24	(Austria) R Gardos	8	6	11	7	11	6
(Portugal) T Apolónia	9	7	8	9
2	(China) L Ma	11	11	11	11

Fourth Round
(Japan) K Matsudaira	9	7	11	11	11	11	9
2	(China) L Ma	11	11	4	13	8	8	11
