= Table tennis at the 2000 Summer Olympics – Men's singles =

Table tennis at the Olympics

Table tennis – Men's singles at the Games of the XXVII Olympiad
- Venue: State Sports Centre
- Date: 17 to 25 September 2000
- Competitors: 64 from 35 nations

Medalists
1st place, gold medalist(s)		Kong Linghui	China
2nd place, silver medalist(s)		Jan-Ove Waldner	Sweden
3rd place, bronze medalist(s)		Liu Guoliang	China

These are the results of the men's singles competition, one of two events for male competitors in table tennis at the 2000 Summer Olympics in Sydney.

Among 64 entries, 16 seeded players were allocated into the draw of knockout stage which started from the round of 32. The rest competed in groups of three players per group. Winners of each group advanced to the knockout stage.

== Seeds ==
1. Kong Linghui (CHN) (champion, gold medalist)
2. Vladimir Samsonov (BLR) (quarterfinals)
3. Liu Guoliang (CHN) (semifinals, bronze medalist)
4. Chiang Peng-lung (TPE) (second round)
5. Jan-Ove Waldner (SWE) (Final, silver medalist)
6. Werner Schlager (AUT) (quarterfinals)
7. Jörgen Persson (SWE) (semifinals, fourth place)
8. Zoran Primorac (CRO) (first round)
9. Kim Taek-soo (KOR) (first round)
10. Liu Guozheng (CHN) (quarterfinals)
11. Jean-Michel Saive (BEL) (second round)
12. Peter Karlsson (SWE) (first round)
13. Jean-Philippe Gatien (FRA) (first round)
14. Damien Eloi (FRA) (second round)
15. Koji Matsushita (JPN) (second round)
16. Christophe Legout (FRA) (second round)

== Group stage ==
=== Group A ===
Rank	Athlete	W	L	GW	GL	PW	PL	GRE	EGY	INA
1	Kalinikos Kreanga (GRE)	2	0	6	0	126	68	X	3–0	3–0
2	El-sayed Lashin (EGY)	1	1	3	3	100	124	0–3	X	3–0
3	Anton Suseno (INA)	0	2	0	6	96	130	0–3	0–3	X

=== Group B ===
Rank	Athlete	W	L	GW	GL	PW	PL	GER	USA	EGY
1	Jörg Roßkopf (GER)	2	0	6	0	126	69	X	3–0	3–0
2	David Zhuang (USA)	1	1	3	4	110	127	0–3	X	3–1
3	Ashraf Helmy (EGY)	0	2	1	6	98	138	0–3	1–3	X

=== Group C ===
Rank	Athlete	W	L	GW	GL	PW	PL	CZE	IND	NZL
1	Petr Korbel (CZE)	2	0	6	1	139	107	X	3–1	3–0
2	Chetan Baboor (IND)	1	1	4	3	137	138	1–3	X	3–0
3	Peter Jackson (NZL)	0	2	0	6	101	132	0–3	0–3	X

=== Group D ===
Rank	Athlete	W	L	GW	GL	PW	PL	CAN	NGR	CUB
1	Wenguan Johnny Huang (CAN)	2	0	6	2	160	123	X	3–2	3–0
2	Segun Toriola (NGR)	1	1	5	4	165	163	2–3	X	3–1
3	Renier Sosa (CUB)	0	2	1	6	106	145	0–3	1–3	X

=== Group E ===
Rank	Athlete	W	L	GW	GL	PW	PL	POL	ROU	AUS
1	Lucjan Błaszczyk (POL)	2	0	6	2	161	130	X	3–2	3–0
2	Adrian Crișan (ROU)	1	1	5	3	155	133	2–3	X	3–0
3	Simon Gerada (AUS)	0	2	0	6	74	127	0–3	0–3	X

=== Group F ===
Rank	Athlete	W	L	GW	GL	PW	PL	JPN	USA	CUB
1	Seiko Iseki (JPN)	2	0	6	1	142	103	X	3–1	3–0
2	Cheng Yinghua (USA)	1	1	4	3	135	115	1–3	X	3–0
3	Francisco Arado (CUB)	0	2	0	6	67	126	0–3	0–3	X

=== Group G ===
Rank	Athlete	W	L	GW	GL	PW	PL	JPN	CZE	CHI
1	Toshio Tasaki (JPN)	2	0	6	1	137	118	X	3–0	3–1
2	Josef Plachý (CZE)	1	1	3	3	113	107	0–3	X	3–0
3	Jorge Gambra (CHI)	0	2	1	6	112	137	1–3	0–3	X

=== Group H ===
Rank	Athlete	W	L	GW	GL	PW	PL	HKG	BRA	CAN
1	Cheung Yuk (HKG)	2	0	6	3	182	152	X	3–2	3–1
2	Hugo Hoyama (BRA)	1	1	5	3	155	145	0–3	X	3–0
3	Kurt Liu (CAN)	0	2	1	6	105	145	1–3	0–3	X

=== Group I ===
Rank	Athlete	W	L	GW	GL	PW	PL	KOR	AUS	HKG
1	Ryu Seung-min (KOR)	2	0	6	0	127	88	X	3–0	3–0
2	Mark Smythe (AUS)	1	1	3	5	128	158	0–3	X	3–2
3	Leung Chu Yan (HKG)	0	2	2	6	143	152	0–3	2–3	X

=== Group J ===
Rank	Athlete	W	L	GW	GL	PW	PL	NED	GRE	IRI
1	Trinko Keen (NED)	2	0	6	1	144	75	X	3–1	3–0
2	Ntaniel Tsiokas (GRE)	1	1	4	3	118	126	1–3	X	3–0
3	Majidreza Ehteshamzadeh (IRI)	0	2	0	6	65	126	0–3	0–3	X

=== Group K ===
Rank	Athlete	W	L	GW	GL	PW	PL	NED	POL	AUS
1	Danny Heister (NED)	2	0	6	0	126	90	X	3–0	3–0
2	Tomasz Krzeszewski (POL)	1	1	3	3	112	107	0–3	X	3–0
3	Russ Lavale (AUS)	0	2	0	6	85	126	0–3	0–3	X

=== Group L ===
Rank	Athlete	W	L	GW	GL	PW	PL	KOR	SCG	NGR
1	Lee Chul-seung (KOR)	2	0	6	2	155	132	X	3–2	3–0
2	Slobodan Grujić (SCG)	1	1	5	3	152	136	2–3	X	3–0
3	Peter Akinlabi (NGR)	0	2	0	6	87	126	0–3	0–3	X

=== Group M ===
Rank	Athlete	W	L	GW	GL	PW	PL	GER	ARG	QAT
1	Timo Boll (GER)	2	0	6	1	143	99	X	3–1	3–0
2	Liu Song (ARG)	1	1	4	4	137	143	1–3	X	3–1
3	Hamad Al-Hammadi (QAT)	0	2	1	6	101	139	0–3	1–3	X

=== Group N ===
Rank	Athlete	W	L	GW	GL	PW	PL	TPE	AUT	TUN
1	Chang Yen-shu (TPE)	2	0	6	0	126	78	X	3–0	3–0
2	Ding Yi (AUT)	1	1	3	3	113	99	0–3	X	3–0
3	Gdara Hamam (TUN)	0	2	0	6	64	126	0–3	0–3	X

=== Group O ===
Rank	Athlete	W	L	GW	GL	PW	PL	GER	GBR	MRI
1	Peter Franz (GER)	2	0	6	0	128	64	X	3–0	3–0
2	Matthew Syed (GBR)	1	1	3	3	96	85	0–3	X	3–0
3	Patrick Sahajasein (MRI)	0	2	0	6	51	126	0–3	0–3	X

=== Group P ===
Rank	Athlete	W	L	GW	GL	PW	PL	BEL	BLR	CHI
1	Philippe Saive (BEL)	2	0	6	1	145	107	X	3–1	3–0
2	Yevgeny Shchetinin (BLR)	1	1	4	3	141	118	1–3	X	3–0
3	Augusto Morales (CHI)	0	2	0	6	65	126	0–3	0–3	X

== Knockout stage ==
=== Finals ===
Gold medal match
1	Kong Linghui (CHN)	21	21	17	14	21
5	Jan-Ove Waldner (SWE)	16	19	21	21	13

Bronze medal match
7	Jörgen Persson (SWE)	18	21	14	13
3	Liu Guoliang (CHN)	21	19	21	21

=== Top half ===
First round
1	Kong L (CHN)	21	21	21
WJ Huang (CAN)	14	12	16
L Błaszczyk (POL)	21	21	21
13	J-P Gatien (FRA)	5	17	13
9	Kim T-s (KOR)	11	21	18	17
T Boll (GER)	21	15	21	21
D Heister (NED)	21	21	19	19	12
6	W Schlager (AUT)	13	8	21	21	21
7	J Persson (SWE)	21	21	16	21
P Franz (GER)	16	15	21	18
Cheung Y (HKG)	20	19	17
15	K Matsushita (JPN)	22	21	21
10	Liu GZ (CHN)	21	21	18	17	21
P Saive (BEL)	14	16	21	21	15
K Kreanga (GRE)	23	12	22
4	Chiang P-l (TPE)	25	21	24

Second round
1	Kong L (CHN)	18	21	21	20	21
L Błaszczyk (POL)	21	17	10	22	14
T Boll (GER)	22	21	21	13	16
6	W Schlager (AUT)	24	19	17	21	21
7	J Persson (SWE)	21	21	21
15	K Matsushita (JPN)	14	13	19
10	Liu GZ (CHN)	21	21	21
4	Chiang P-l (TPE)	11	13	19

Quarterfinals
1	Kong L (CHN)	21	13	20	21	21
6	W Schlager (AUT)	14	21	22	10	14
7	J Persson (SWE)	14	21	21	21
10	Liu GZ (CHN)	21	18	16	19

Semifinals
1	Kong L (CHN)	21	13	21	21
7	J Persson (SWE)	12	21	16	13

=== Bottom half ===
First round
3	Liu GL (CHN)	21	22	21
T Keen (NED)	14	20	19
Lee C-s (KOR)	14	21	6	20
14	D Eloi (FRA)	21	11	21	22
12	P Karlsson (SWE)	22	19	17	21	12
J Roßkopf (GER)	20	21	21	19	21
T Tasaki (JPN)	25	21	21
8	Z Primorac (CRO)	23	16	17
5	J-O Waldner (SWE)	21	21	21	21
S Iseki (JPN)	23	13	15	17
P Korbel (CZE)	11	13	17
11	J-M Saive (BEL)	21	21	21
16	C Legout (FRA)	21	21	10	25	21
Ryu S-m (KOR)	15	23	21	23	17
Chang Y-s (TPE)	14	21	14
2	V Samsonov (BLR)	21	23	21

Second round
3	Liu GL (CHN)	19	12	22	21	21
14	D Eloi (FRA)	21	21	20	9	13
J Roßkopf (GER)	17	21	21	19	21
T Tasaki (JPN)	21	15	13	21	14
5	J-O Waldner (SWE)	21	19	21	21
11	J-M Saive (BEL)	14	21	18	15
16	C Legout (FRA)	11	17	12
2	V Samsonov (BLR)	21	21	21

Quarterfinals
3	Liu GL (CHN)	21	21	21
J Roßkopf (GER)	11	14	7
5	J-O Waldner (SWE)	20	18	21	21	21
2	V Samsonov (BLR)	22	21	14	18	19

Semifinals
3	Liu GL (CHN)	19	16	19
5	J-O Waldner (SWE)	21	21	21

== Competitors ==
Athlete	Nation	Eliminated
El-sayed Lashin	Egypt	Groups
Anton Suseno	Indonesia	Groups
David Zhuang	United States	Groups
Ashraf Helmy	Egypt	Groups
Chetan Baboor	India	Groups
Peter Jackson	New Zealand	Groups
Segun Toriola	Nigeria	Groups
Renier Sosa	Cuba	Groups
Adrian Crișan	Romania	Groups
Simon Gerada	Australia	Groups
Cheng Yinghua	United States	Groups
Francisco Arado	Cuba	Groups
Josef Plachý	Czech Republic	Groups
Jorge Gambra	Chile	Groups
Hugo Hoyama	Brazil	Groups
Kurt Liu	Canada	Groups
Mark Smythe	Australia	Groups
Leung Chu Yan	Hong Kong	Groups
Ntaniel Tsiokas	Greece	Groups
Majidreza Ehteshamzadeh	Iran	Groups
Russ Lavale	Poland	Groups
Tomasz Krzeszewski	Australia	Groups
Slobodan Grujić	FR Yugoslavia	Groups
Peter Akinlabi	Nigeria	Groups
Liu Song	Argentina	Groups
Hamah Al-Hammadi	Qatar	Groups
Ding Yi	Austria	Groups
Gdara Hamam	Tunisia	Groups
Matthew Syed	Great Britain	Groups
Jean-Patrick Sahajasein	Mauritius	Groups
Yevgeny Shchetinin	Belarus	Groups
Augusto Morales	Chile	Groups
Wenguan Johnny Huang	Canada	32
Jean-Philippe Gatien	France	32
Kim Taek-Soo	South Korea	32
Danny Heister	Netherlands	32
Peter Franz	Germany	32
Cheung Yuk	Hong Kong	32
Philippe Saive	Belgium	32
Kalinikos Kreanga	Greece	32
Trinko Keen	Netherlands	32
Lee Chul-Seung	South Korea	32
Peter Karlsson	Sweden	32
Zoran Primorac	Croatia	32
Seiko Iseki	Japan	32
Petr Korbel	Czech Republic	32
Ryu Seung-Min	South Korea	32
Chang Yen-shu	Chinese Taipei	32
Lucjan Blaszczyk	Poland	16
Timo Boll	Germany	16
Koji Matsushita	Japan	16
Chiang Peng-lung	Chinese Taipei	16
Damien Eloi	France	16
Toshio Tasaki	Japan	16
Jean-Michel Saive	Belgium	16
Christophe Legout	France	16
Werner Schlager	Austria	8
Liu Guozheng	China	8
Jörg Roßkopf	Germany	8
Vladimir Samsonov	Belarus	8
Jörgen Persson	Sweden	4
Liu Guoliang	China	3
Jan-Ove Waldner	Sweden	2
Kong Linghui	China	1
