= 2001 World Table Tennis Championships – Men's team =

2001 men's team (Swaythling Cup)

The 2001 World Table Tennis Championships – men's team (Swaythling Cup) was the 46th edition of the men's team championship.

China won the gold medal defeating Belgium 3–0 in the final. Sweden and South Korea won bronze medals.

== Medalists ==
| Event | Gold | Silver | Bronze |
|---|---|---|---|
| | China; Kong Linghui; Liu Guoliang; Liu Guozheng; Ma Lin; Wang Liqin | Belgium; Martin Bratanov; Marc Closset; Andras Podpinka; Jean-Michel Saive; Philippe Saive | South Korea; Joo Se-Hyuk; Kim Taek-Soo; Lee Chul-Seung; Oh Sang-Eun; Ryu Seung-Min |
| | China; Kong Linghui; Liu Guoliang; Liu Guozheng; Ma Lin; Wang Liqin | Belgium; Martin Bratanov; Marc Closset; Andras Podpinka; Jean-Michel Saive; Philippe Saive | Sweden; Fredrik Håkansson; Peter Karlsson; Magnus Molin; Jörgen Persson; Jan-Ove Waldner |

== Final stage knockout phase ==
=== Round of 16 ===
| Team One | Team Two | Score |
|---|---|---|
| China | Netherlands | 3–1 |
| South Korea | Czech Republic | 3–2 |
| Belgium | Yugoslavia | 3–0 |
| Italy | Japan | 3–0 |
| Germany | Poland | 3-2 |
| Sweden | Greece | 3-1 |
| Austria | Chinese Taipei | 3–2 |
| France | Belarus | 3–2 |

=== Quarter finals ===
| Team One | Team Two | Score |
|---|---|---|
| Sweden | Austria | 3–0 |
| China | Germany | 3–1 |
| Belgium | Italy | 3–0 |
| South Korea | France | 3–2 |

=== Semifinals ===
| Team One | Team Two | Score |
|---|---|---|
| Belgium | Sweden | 3–1 |
| China | South Korea | 3–2 |

=== Final ===
| China 3 | | Belgium 0 | Score |
|---|---|---|---|
| Ma Lin | bt | Jean-Michel Saive | 18–21 21–7 21–15 |
| Liu Guozheng | bt | Philippe Saive | 21–18 21–17 |
| Kong Linghui | bt | Martin Bratanov | 21–18 21–19 |

== See also ==
List of World Table Tennis Championships medalists
