= Borussia Düsseldorf =

German table tennis club

- Founded: 1949; 77 years ago
- League: Tischtennis-Bundesliga
- Home ground: ARAGCenterCourt
- 2023–24: 1st of 11
- Website: https://www.borussia-duesseldorf.com/

Borussia Düsseldorf is a table tennis club from the North Rhine-Westphalian state capital Düsseldorf. It is Germany's most successful table tennis club and, with 78 titles, the second most successful German sports club after Wasserfreunde Spandau 04.

In addition to the male professional team, which plays in the Bundesliga, the club also has women's, youth and disabled teams. Around 400 athletes were organized in the club in 2022.

== History ==
Borussia Düsseldorf emerged as an independent table tennis club from the Polizei-Sport-Vereinigung PSV Borussia 02, which had been founded in 1949 as a merger of the clubs SC Grafenberg 02 and Borussia-Concordia 05. Under the leadership of Theo Sommer († 1960), the men's team advanced to the Oberliga. On May 2, 1984, the table tennis division of PSV was re-established as an independent club under the name Borussia Düsseldorf, because it was hoped that this would have tax advantages.

The club was not yet able to qualify for the first Bundesliga season in 1966/67. But just one year later, the club was promoted to the Bundesliga and has been a member ever since. Its rise to become the most successful table tennis club in Germany began in 1969, with the first Bundesliga title. The successes are based on professional club management. Borussia was the first German table tennis club to have a manager and a coach.

To promote youth work, the club organized the first Children's Olympics in 1988, which is still held regularly today – now as the “Kids Open”. Around 1,400 children from Germany, the Netherlands and Luxembourg took part in the first edition. Participants now come from all over the world, including China, Japan and Sweden.

In 2007, Düsseldorf strengthened its team with Timo Boll and has dominated the German Table Tennis League ever since: Borussia has won nine out of ten championships and nine of the next eleven cups. The team also won the Champions League in 2009 and celebrated the triple of championship, cup and Champions League in both 2010 and 2011 and again in 2018 and 2021.

== Honours ==
- Bundesliga:
  - Winner: 1969, 1970, 1971, 1974, 1975, 1978, 1979, 1980, 1981, 1982, 1986, 1988, 1990, 1992, 1993, 1995, 1996, 1998, 2003, 2008, 2009, 2010, 2011, 2012, 2014, 2015, 2016, 2017, 2018, 2021, 2022, 2023, 2024
- German Cup
  - Winner: 1970, 1971, 1974, 1975, 1978, 1979, 1982, 1984, 1988, 1990, 1991, 1994, 1995, 1996, 1997, 1999, 2000, 2008, 2010, 2011, 2013, 2014, 2015, 2016, 2017, 2018, 2021, 2024
- European Champions League:
  - Winner: 2000, 2009, 2010, 2011, 2018, 2021, 2022
- ETTU Cup:
  - Winner: 1987, 1995, 2007, 2012
- European Club Cup of Champions:
  - Winner: 1989, 1991, 1992, 1993, 1997, 1998

== Team ==
=== Current squad ===
Squad for the 2024–25 season

- (Germany) Timo Boll
- (Germany) Dang Qiu
- (Sweden) Anton Källberg
- (Germany) Kay Stumper
- (Norway) Borgar Haug
- (India) Sharath Kamal
- Coach: (Netherlands) Danny Heister
- Manager: (Germany) Andreas Preuss

=== Notable players ===
- (Egypt) Omar Assar
- (Germany) Patrick Baum
- (Germany) Hilde Bussmann
- (England) Desmond Douglas
- (Germany) Steffen Fetzner
- (Germany) Patrick Franziska
- (Portugal) Marcos Freitas
- (Greece) Panagiotis Gionis
- (Germany) Danny Heister
- (Germany) Lars Hielscher
- (Sweden) Kristian Karlsson
- (Netherlands) Trinko Keen
- (Japan) Seiya Kishikawa
- (Czech Republic) Petr Korbel
- (Germany) Wilfried Lieck
- (Japan) Kōji Matsushita
- (Denmark) Michael Maze
- (Germany) Sandra Mikolaschek
- (Japan) Jun Mizutani
- (Sweden) Magnus Molin
- (Denmark) Martin Monrad
- (Germany) Dimitrij Ovtcharov
- (Sweden) Jörgen Persson
- (Czech Republic) Josef Plachý
- (Germany) Jörg Roßkopf
- (Belgium) Philippe Saive
- (Belarus) Vladimir Samsonov
- (Germany) Eberhard Schöler
- (Germany) Bastian Steger
- (Germany) Christian Süß
- (Germany) Ricardo Walther
- (Germany) Torben Wosik
