= Panathinaikos (table tennis club) =

- Nicknames: The Trifolium
- Founded: 1924; 102 years ago
- Based in: Athens, Greece
- Stadium: Leoforos Alexandras Stadium
- President: Dimitris Vranopoulos
- Coaches: Lefteris Makras (men's); Nikos Zervas (women's)
- Website: pao1908.com pao1908.com

The table tennis department of Panathinaikos A.O. was founded in 1924 by player Nikos Mantzaroglou. Through the next decades Panathinaikos became one of the best table tennis teams in Greece with a lot of successes in both men and women.

In 1974, the men's team had its biggest success in the European competitions. In the ETTU Cup, Panathinaikos passed Turnerschaft Innsbruck, Centro Sportivo Milano, TTC Rot-Weiß Hamburg and reached the semi-finals, where they were disqualified by Hertha BSC Berlin.

== History ==
The table tennis department of Panathinaikos A.O. was founded in 1939, led by table tennis instructor Nikos Mantzaroglou.

The first official men’s title for Panathinaikos came in 1951, and since then the “Greens” have been among the dominant forces, particularly throughout the 1960s.

In 1974, the men’s team reached the semifinals of the Cup Winners’ Cup, while over the years many of its players became Balkan and Mediterranean champions.

In 2001, Panathinaikos found itself in the B’ Division of Attica, and a renewal process was initiated — gradually restoring the department to its rightful place among the country’s top clubs.

One of the women’s team’s best seasons was in 1972, when the squad captured three official titles: the Greek Championship (Overall Standings), the Greek Championship (Women’s Division), and the Greek Cup. However, the landmark year came in 2022, when the women’s team won the Europe Trophy, a historic international triumph.

The 1974 season is considered the pinnacle year for the department, with the men’s team consisting of Priftis, Kostopoulos, Kolymbadis, and the Makris brothers.

Panathinaikos successively eliminated Innsbruck (5–1), Centro Sportivo Milano (5–0), and Rot-Weiss Hamburg (5–4) at the Sporting indoor hall, becoming the first Greek team ever to reach the semifinals of a European competition.

In the semifinals, Panathinaikos faced Hertha Berlin, from which it was eliminated with a 5–3 score. It is also worth noting that in the same year, the “Shamrock” captured the Cities Cup title.

== Honours ==
- Greek Clubs' Championship, Men (12):
  - 1951, 1952, 1955, 1956, 1958, 1959, 1960, 1961, 1962, 1966, 1968, 1975
- Greek Clubs' Championship, Women (4):
  - 1972, 1973, 1974, 2026
- Greek Cup, Men (3):
  - 1965,1966, 1969
- Greek Cup, Women (2):
  - 1972, 2022
- ETTU Cup, Men
  - Semi-finals (1): 1974
- ETTU Europe Trophy, Men
  - Winners (2): 2024, 2026
  - 5th place (1): 2025
- ETTU Europe Trophy, Women
  - Winners (1): 2022
  - Semi-finals (1): 2025
  - 3th place (1): 2026

== Current players ==
Season 2026–27

=== Men's squad ===
Name	Nat.
Amirreza Abbasi	(Iran)
Panagiotis Gionis	(Greece)
Giorgos Konstantinopoulos	(Greece)
Kostas Konstantinopoulos	(Greece)
Tamás Lakatos	(Hungary)
Andrea Puppo	(Italy)

=== Women's squad ===
Name	Nat.
Maria Artsetou	(Greece)
Ioanna Gerasimatou	(Greece)
Konstantina Paridi	(Greece)
Nikoleta Stefanova	(Italy)
Ana Tofant	(Slovenia)
Katerina Toliou	(Greece)

== Former Notable players ==
=== Men ===
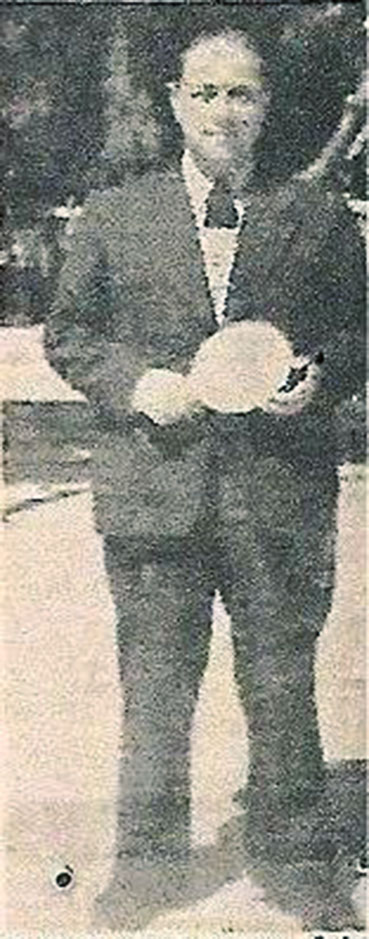
Nikos Mantzaroglou

- Andrej Gaćina
- Jorge Campos
- Emmanuel Lebesson
- Spyros Giannakopoulos
- Giannis Kalogiannis
- Nikos Kostopoulos
- Maria Louka
- Stamatina Louka
- Nikos Mantzaroglou
- Kostas Priftis
- Lena Ralli
- Eleni Vlachaki
- Jakub Dyjas
- João Monteiro
- Kristian Karlsson
- Betty Janes Klosky

=== Women ===
- Dina Meshref
- Szandra Pergel
- Katarzyna Grzybowska
- Elizabeta Samara

== Sources ==
- 100 years Panathinaikos, Liveri, 2008
- Official website (in Greek)
