= Aleksandar Karakašević =

Serbian table tennis player

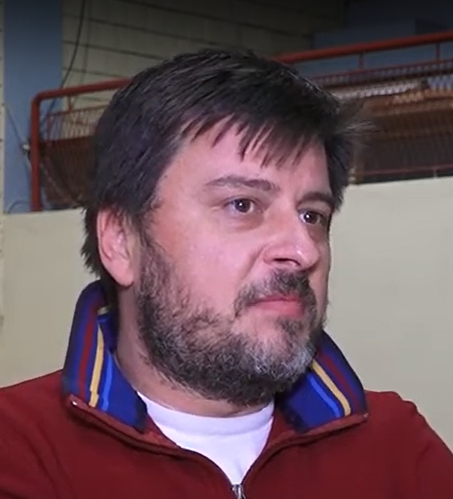
- Aleksandar Karakašević

Personal information
- Full name: Aleksandar Karakašević
- Nationality: Yugoslavia; Serbia and Montenegro; Serbia
- Born: 9 December 1975 (age 50) Zemun, SR Serbia, SFR Yugoslavia
- Height: 5 ft 10 in (178 cm)

Sport
- Sport: Table tennis
- Playing style: Left-handed, All round player
Medal record
Men's table tennis
Representing Yugoslavia / Serbia and Montenegro / Serbia
ITTF World Tour Grand Finals
Bronze medal – third place	1996 Tianjin	Doubles
Bronze medal – third place	2001 Hainan	Doubles
Bronze medal – third place	2003 Guangzhou	Doubles
European Championships
Gold medal – first place	2000 Bremen	Mixed Doubles
Gold medal – first place	2005 Aarhus	Mixed Doubles
Gold medal – first place	2007 Belgrade	Mixed Doubles
Gold medal – first place	2009 Subotica	Mixed Doubles
Silver medal – second place	2002 Zagreb	Mixed Doubles
Silver medal – second place	2011 Istanbul	Mixed Doubles
Bronze medal – third place	2003 Courmayeur	Doubles
Bronze medal – third place	2009 Stuttgart	Doubles
Bronze medal – third place	2010 Subotica	Mixed Doubles
Bronze medal – third place	2011 Gdańsk–Sopot	Singles
Bronze medal – third place	2011 Gdańsk–Sopot	Doubles
Bronze medal – third place	2016 Budapest	Mixed Doubles
Bronze medal – third place	2018 Alicante	Mixed Doubles
European Nations Cup
Bronze medal – third place	1996 Bayreuth	Team
Mediterranean Games
Gold medal – first place	2001 Tunis	Doubles
Gold medal – first place	2005 Almería	Doubles
Silver medal – second place	1997 Bari	Doubles
Bronze medal – third place	2009 Pescara	Team

Aleksandar Karakašević (Serbian Cyrillic: Александар Каракашевић; born 9 December 1975) is a Serbian table tennis player. His powerful backhand has helped him win against some of the top players in the world. He won a bronze medal at the 2011 European Championship. One of his greatest results is his win at the US Open Championship in July 2007, where he established himself as a world class athlete, winning the tournament title for the 3rd time by defeating Kurashima Yosuke from Japan with the result of 4:0. In 2020, at the age of 45, he was still playing in German Bundesliga (first German division) representing TTC Zugbrücke Grenzau.

Karakašević competed at the 1996, 2004, 2008, 2012, and 2016 Summer Olympics.

On 20 November 2021, it was announced that Karakašević had joined the Serbian Progressive Party.

His father, Milivoj Karakašević was a Yugoslav table tennis player.

== Career Highlights and Accomplishments ==
- Bronze medal at European Championship – Singles
- European Champion – Mixed Doubles (four times)
- US Open Champion – Singles (three times)
- US Open Champion – Doubles
- Second place in Europe – Mixed Doubles
- Third place in Pro-Tour final – Men's Doubles- (twice)
- German Open Champion – Men's Doubles
- Brazilian Open Champion – Doubles
- Brazilian Open Champion – Teams
- Mediterranean games Champion – Men's Doubles
- Second place in Mediterranean games – Doubles (twice)
- Second place – Netherlands Open – Men's Doubles
- Third place – Qatar Open – Men's Doubles (twice)
- Balkan Champion (six times)
- Second finisher in European Trials for the Olympic games
- Third place in Junior Europeans (four times)
- Yugoslavian Champion – Singles (three times)
- Yugoslavian Champion – Men's Doubles (five times)
- Yugoslavian Champion – Mixed Doubles (five times)
- Yugoslavian Champion – Teams (four times)

=== Clubs ===
- STK Unirea Uzdin
- TTF Liebherr Ochsenhausen
- SV Plüderhausen
- STK Partizan
- STK Crvena Zvezda
- UCAM Cartagena TM
- TTC Zugbrücke Grenzau
- Hertha BSC
