= Bojan Tokić =

Slovenian table tennis player

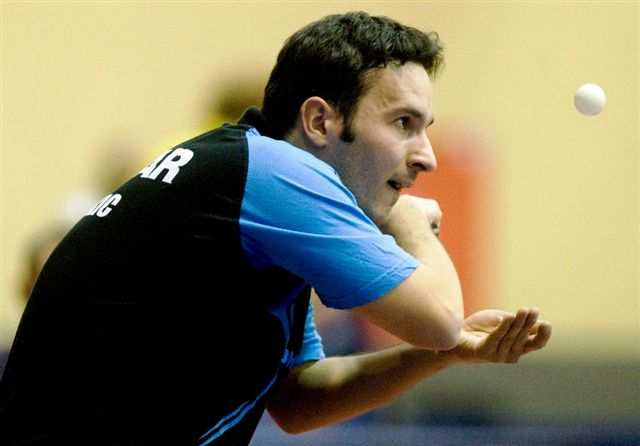

Personal information
- Nickname: Toko
- Nationality: Slovenian
- Born: 13 January 1981 (age 45) Jajce, SR Bosnia and Herzegovina, SFR Yugoslavia

Sport
- Sport: Table tennis
- Playing style: Shakehand, Offensive
- Highest ranking: 25 (November 2011)
- Current ranking: 62 (21 September 2021)
Medal record
Men's table tennis
Representing Slovenia
European Championships
Bronze medal – third place	2009 Stuttgart	Doubles
Bronze medal – third place	2011 Gdańsk-Sopot	Singles
Bronze medal – third place	2011 Gdańsk-Sopot	Doubles
Bronze medal – third place	2025 Zadar	Team
Mediterranean Games
Gold medal – first place	2018 Tarragona	Team
Bronze medal – third place	2005 Almería	Doubles

Bojan Tokić (born 13 January 1981) is a Slovenian table tennis player.

== Career ==
Tokić's first competition was in Montpellier, where he won the ETTU Cup. Via Cagliari, Italy and Ljubljana, Slovenia he transferred to SV Plüderhausen, Germany in the 2000–01 season. He then went back to Slovenia to work within a training group, with which he stayed for three years. In 2003, he returned to Germany to play for TTC Frickenhausen. In 2005–06, he won the ETTU Cup, the DTTB Cup and the German League with the TTC Frickenhausen. In the 2007 European Championships he reached the quarter-finals in the men's singles competition.

Tokić has participated at the 2008 Summer Olympics in Beijing, where he lost in the third round to the eventual champion Ma Lin. At the 2009 World Table Tennis Championships in Yokohama, he lost in the third round against Kaii Yoshida. In 2010, Tokić attended the 2010 Slovenian Open international table tennis tournament. In October 2011, he won a bronze medal in both the singles and doubles competitions of the 2011 European Championships. At the 2012 Olympics, he again lost in the third round, this time to Gao Ning of Singapore.

At the 2016 Olympics in Rio de Janeiro, he lost in the fourth round against Dimitrij Ovtcharov. Tokić took the 1–0 lead after playing the longest table tennis game in history of the Olympics, scoring 64 points total which means he won 33 to 31. He eventually lost the game 4–1.

== Achievements ==
- Singles Bronze medal European Championships
- Doubles Bronze medal 2009 and 2011 European Championships

Olympic Games
Preceded by Vasilij Žbogar	Flagbearer for Slovenia; Tokyo 2020	Succeeded by Ana Gros and Benjamin Savšek
