= Kaii =

Kaii is a Japanese given name. People with this name include:

- Kaii Higashiyama (東山 魁夷; 1908–1999), Japanese artist
- Kaii Yoshida (吉田 海偉; born 1981 as Song Haiwei), Chinese-born Japanese table tennis player
