= German Cup (disambiguation) =

The name German Cup is used by several cup competitions in German sport. In English, it is most commonly used to refer to the DFB-Pokal, an annual German football cup competition.

The term may also refer to:

== Basketball ==
- BBL-Pokal, an annual basketball cup competition
- BBL Champions Cup, an inactive basketball cup competition

== Football ==
- DFB-Pokal Frauen, the women's equivalent of the DFB-Cup, held annually
- DFL-Supercup, an annual football match between the winners of the Bundesliga and the winners of the DFB-Pokal

== Other sports ==
- German Cup (ice hockey), an annual ice hockey cup competition
- German Cup (table tennis), an annual table tennis cup competition
