= Marc Closset =

Belgian table tennis player

Personal information
- Nationality: Belgium
- Born: 1 November 1974 (age 51)
Medal record
Representing Belgium
World Table Tennis Championships
| Silver medal – second place | 2001 | Men's Team |

Marc Closset is a male former international table tennis player from Belgium.

He won a silver medal at the 2001 World Table Tennis Championships in the Swaythling Cup (men's team event) with Martin Bratanov, Andras Podpinka, Jean-Michel Saive and Philippe Saive for Belgium.

== See also ==
- List of table tennis players
- List of World Table Tennis Championships medalists
