= Andras Podpinka =

Belgian table tennis player

Personal information
- Nationality: Belgium
- Born: 16 April 1968 (age 58) Budapest
Medal record
Representing Belgium
World Table Tennis Championships
Silver medal – second place	2001	Men's Team

Andras Podpinka is a male former international table tennis player from Belgium.

== Table tennis career ==
He won a silver medal at the 2001 World Table Tennis Championships in the Swaythling Cup (men's team event) with Martin Bratanov, Marc Closset, Jean-Michel Saive and Philippe Saive for Belgium.

== Personal life ==
Andras Podpinka is a nephew of the Hungarian table tennis player Tibor Klampár.

== See also ==
- List of table tennis players
- List of World Table Tennis Championships medalists
