= Gdara Hamam =

Tunisian table tennis player (born 1980)

Personal information
- Nationality: Tunisian
- Born: 11 August 1980 (age 46)

Sport
- Sport: Table tennis

Gdara Hamam (born 11 August 1980) is a Tunisian table tennis player. He competed in the men's singles event at the 2000 Summer Olympics.
