= Patrick Sahajasein =

Mauritian table tennis player

Personal information
- Full name: Jean-Patrick Aladd Sahajasein
- Nationality: Mauritian
- Born: 19 January 1970 (age 55)

Sport
- Sport: Table tennis

Jean-Patrick Aladd Sahajasein (born 19 January 1970) is a Mauritian table tennis player. He competed in the men's singles event at the 2000 Summer Olympics.
