= Olympiacos (table tennis club) =

Greek table tennis club

Olympiacos SFP
- Nicknames: Thrylos (The Legend); Erythrolefkoi (The Red-Whites)
- Founded: 1947
- Based in: Piraeus, Greece
- Colours: Red, White
- President: Michalis Kountouris
- Head coach: Giorgos Christoforakis
- Championships: 1 ETTU Europe Trophy (Men's); 18 Greek League Championships (Men's); 8 Greek Cups (Men's); 30 Greek League Championships (Women's); 11 Greek Cups (Women's)
- Website: olympiacossfp.gr

Olympiacos (Table Tennis) department was established in 1956 and has both a men's and a women's department. Olympiacos is one of the most successful clubs in Greek table tennis history, with its women's department being the most successful, having won a record 30 Greek Leagues and a record 11 Greek Cups.

Olympiacos men's department are the only Greek men's table tennis team that have won a European title, having won the ETTU Europe Trophy in 2022–23. They have also won 19 Greek Leagues and 8 Greek Cups.

== Honours ==
=== Men ===
- ETTU Europe Trophy
  - Winners (1) (record): 2022–23
- 1 European Region-C Cup Men
  - 2022

=== Men ===
- Greek League
  - Winners (19) (record): 1971, 1972, 1973, 1974, 1976, 1977, 1978, 1980, 2004, 2005, 2014, 2016, 2017, 2018, 2022, 2023, 2024, 2025, 2026
- Greek Cup
  - Winners (8): 1971, 1972, 2003, 2004, 2005, 2008, 2022, 2023

=== Women ===
- Greek League
  - Winners (30) (record): 1954, 1955, 1956, 1957, 1958, 1959, 1960, 1961, 1962, 1964, 1965, 1976, 1977, 1978, 1979, 1981, 1982, 1983, 2000, 2001, 2002, 2005, 2006, 2007, 2009, 2018, 2022, 2023, 2024, 2025
- Greek Cup
  - Winners (11) (record): 1965, 1966, 1983, 1984, 1985, 1986, 2001, 2005, 2006, 2007, 2008

== European Honours ==
year	honour	notes
European Club Cup of Champions
1972	Quarter-finals	
ETTU Cup & Fair Cities Cup
1972	Quarter-finals	
1975	Quarter-finals	
1977	Quarter-finals	
ETTU Europe Trophy
2023	Winners	

== Notable players ==
=== Men ===
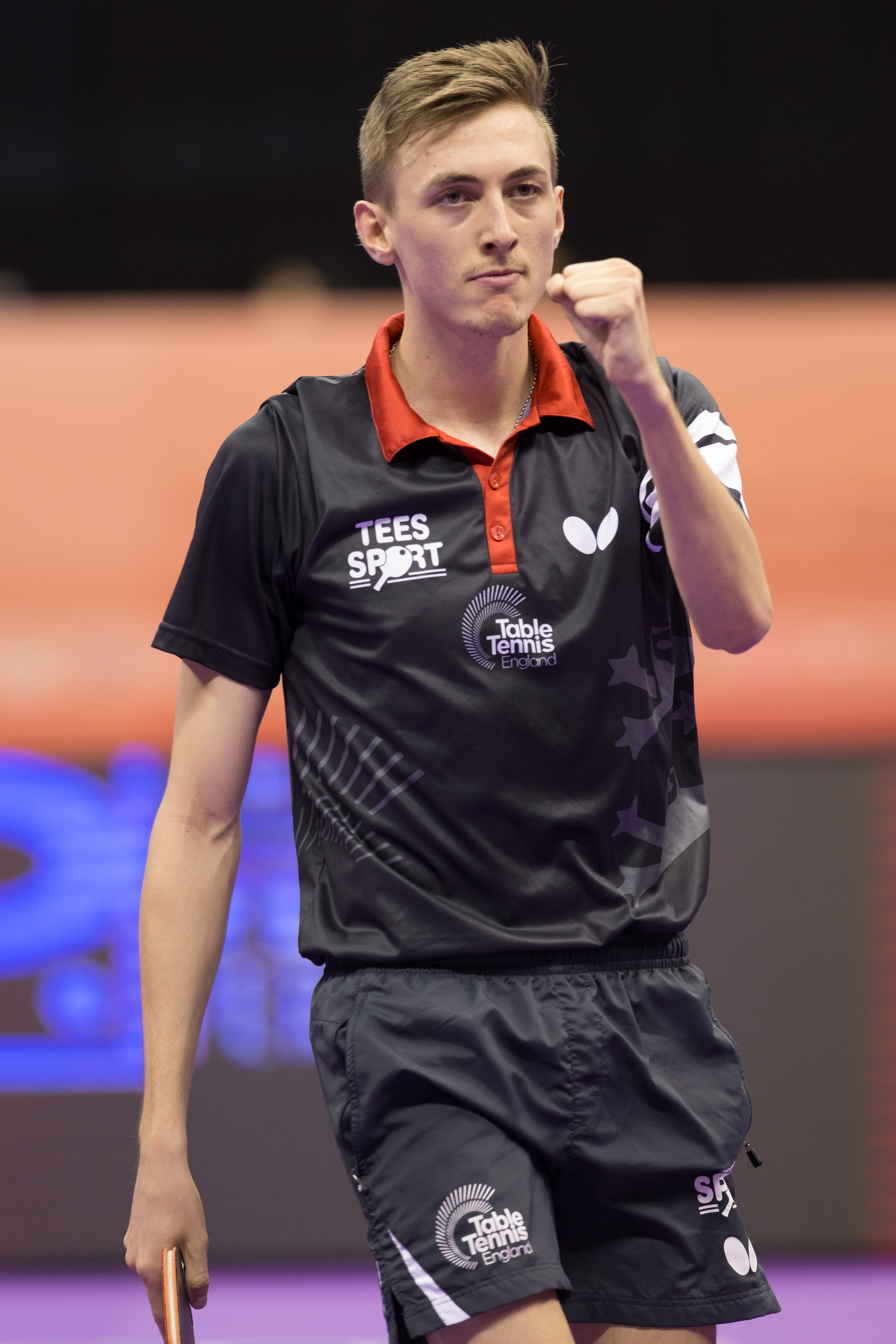
Liam Pitchford

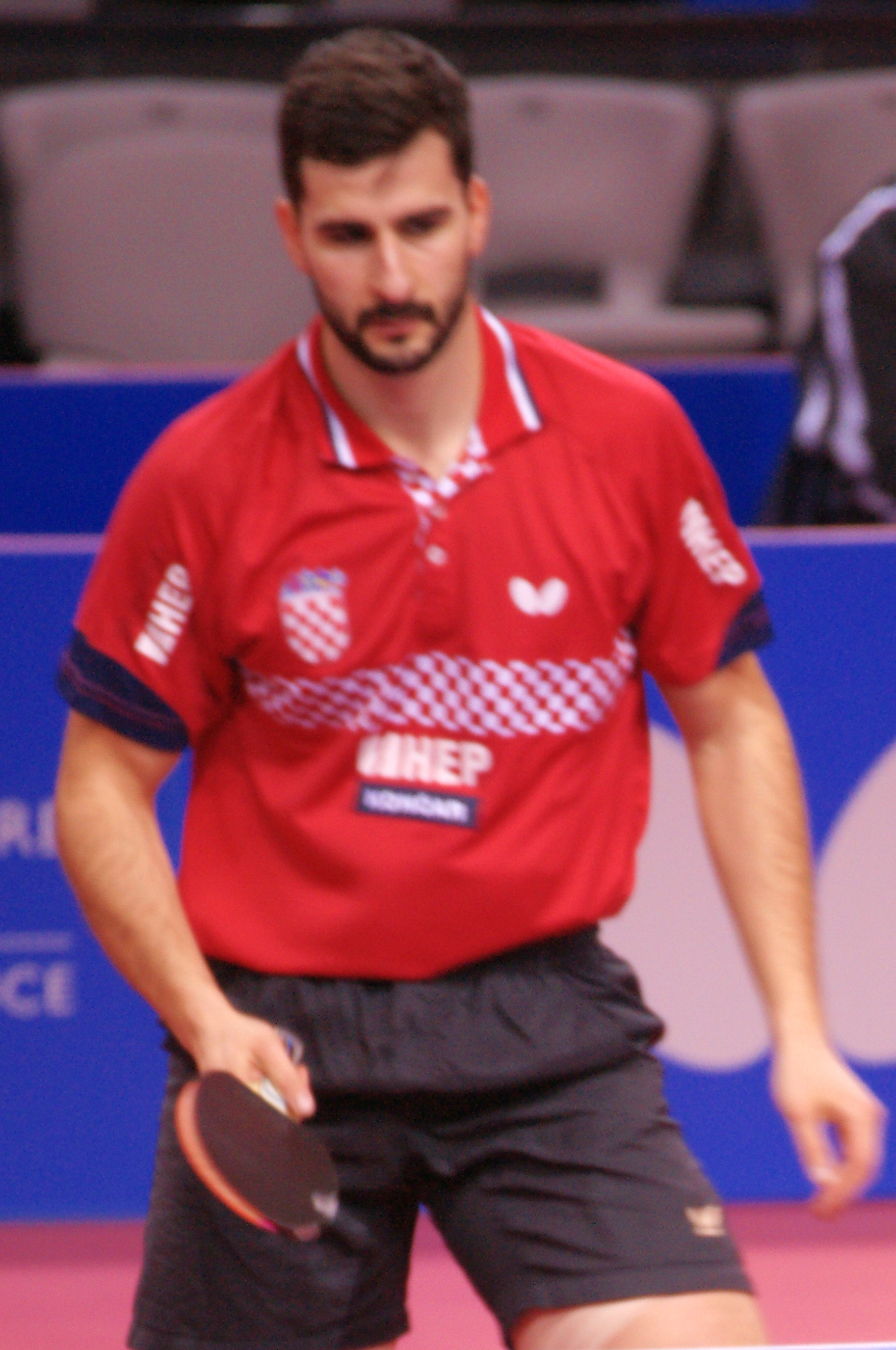
Andrej Gaćina

- (Greece) Claudio Kyrou
- (Greece) Lefteris Makras
- (Greece) Antonis Malinakis
- (Greece) Kostas Papageorgiou
- (Greece) Anastasios Riniotis
- (Greece) Ioannis Sgouropoulos
- (Greece) Alkiviadis Stamatouros
- (Greece) Giorgos Stamatouros
- (Greece) Daniel Tsiokas
- (Greece) Giannis Vlotinos
- (Croatia) Andrej Gaćina
- (Croatia) Tomislav Pucar
- (France) Mehdi Bouloussa
- (United Kingdom) Liam Pitchford
- (Portugal) Enio Mendes
- (Portugal) João Monteiro
- (Russia) Alexander Shibaev
- (Sweden) Simon Arvidsson

=== Women ===
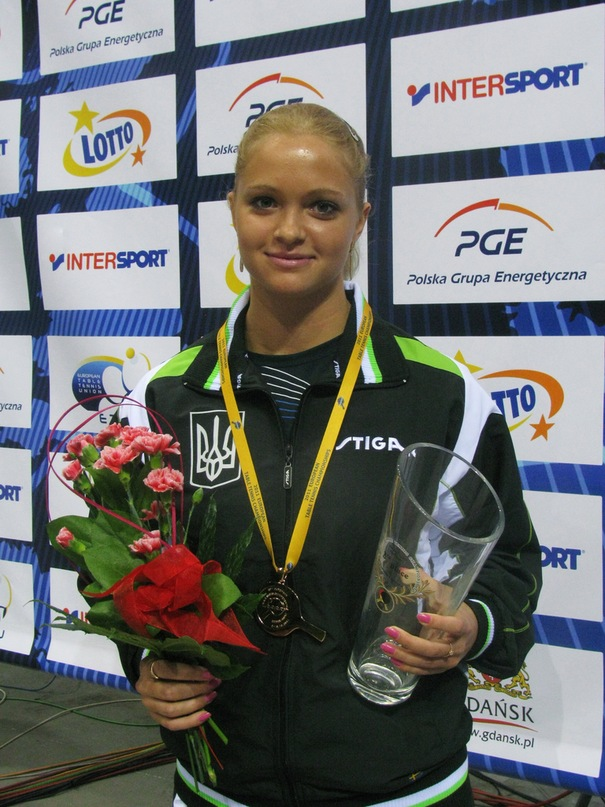
Margaryta Pesotska

- (Greece) Maria Christoforaki
- (Greece) Georgia Chatzaki
- (Greece) Despina Dandoula
- (Greece) Christina Fili
- (Greece) Maria Kalogianni
- (Greece) Maria Kroustalli
- (Greece) Evelina Meramveliotaki
- (Greece) Katerina Ntoulaki
- (Greece) Elisavet Terpou
- (Hungary) Krisztina Ambrus
- (Hungary) Dóra Madarász
- (Hungary) Georgina Póta
- (Spain) Galia Dvorak
- (Sweden) Li Fen
- (Sweden) Christina Källberg
- (Ukraine) Margaryta Pesotska

== Notable coaches ==
- (Greece) Giorgos Christoforakis
