= Roko Tošić =

Croatian table tennis player

Personal information
- Nationality: Croatia
- Born: 14 July 1979 (age 47)

Sport
- Sport: Table tennis
- Highest ranking: 68 (April 2002)
Medal record
Men's table tennis
Representing Croatia
Mediterranean Games
| Silver medal – second place | 2005 Almería | Singles |
| Silver medal – second place | 2009 Pescara | Team |

Roko Tošić (born 14 July 1979) is a Croatian table tennis player. He won silver medals at the 2005 Mediterranean Games and the 2009 Mediterranean Games. With Zoran Primorac, he reached the third round of the 2009 World Table Tennis Championships – Men's doubles, but was defeated by the Hong Kong team. He was ranked 68th in the world in April 2002; and 153rd as of April 2013. As of 2017, he was playing for STK Libertas Marinkolor, Dubrovnik.

== Competitions ==
World Championships:

- 2005 World Table Tennis Championships – Men's singles
- 2007 World Table Tennis Championships – Men's doubles
- 2009 World Table Tennis Championships – Men's singles
- 2009 World Table Tennis Championships – Men's doubles
- 2011 World Table Tennis Championships – Men's singles
- 2011 World Table Tennis Championships – Men's doubles
- 2013 World Table Tennis Championships – Men's singles
- 2013 World Table Tennis Championships – Men's doubles

Mediterranean Games:

- Table tennis at the 2005 Mediterranean Games – Men's singles, silver medal
- Table tennis at the 2009 Mediterranean Games – Men's Team, silver medal
