= Kurt Liu =

Canadian table tennis player

Personal information
- Nationality: Canadian
- Born: 10 October 1978 (age 47)

Sport
- Sport: Table tennis

Kurt Liu (born 10 October 1978) is a Canadian table tennis player. He competed in the men's singles event at the 2000 Summer Olympics.
