= Renier Sosa =

Cuban table tennis player

Personal information
- Nationality: Cuban
- Born: 30 April 1972 (age 53)

Sport
- Sport: Table tennis

Renier Sosa (born 30 April 1972) is a Cuban table tennis player. He competed in the men's singles event at the 2000 Summer Olympics.
