= Table tennis at the 2005 Mediterranean Games =

The Table Tennis Competition at the 2005 Mediterranean Games was held in the Máximo Cuervo Sports Hall in Almería, Spain.

== Men's competition ==
=== Men's singles ===
Rank	Final
1st place, gold medalist(s)	Min Yang (ITA)
2nd place, silver medalist(s)	Roko Tosic (CRO)
3rd place, bronze medalist(s)	Slobodan Grujić (SCG)

=== Men's doubles ===
Rank	Final
1st place, gold medalist(s)	Slobodan Grujić (SCG); Aleksandar Karakašević (SCG)
2nd place, silver medalist(s)	Zhiwen He (ESP); Carlos Machado (ESP)
3rd place, bronze medalist(s)	Sasa Ignjatovic (SLO); Bojan Tokic (SLO)

== Women's competition ==
=== Women's singles ===
Rank	Final
1st place, gold medalist(s)	Tamara Boros (CRO)
2nd place, silver medalist(s)	Wenling Tan Monfardini (ITA)
3rd place, bronze medalist(s)	Nikoleta Stefanova (ITA)

=== Women's doubles ===
Rank	Final
1st place, gold medalist(s)	Silvija Erdelji (SCG); Anamaria Erdelji (SCG)
2nd place, silver medalist(s)	Carole Grundısch (FRA); Laurie Phai Pang (FRA)
3rd place, bronze medalist(s)	Laura Negrisoli (ITA); Nikoleta Stefanova (ITA)

== Medal table ==
Place	Nation	1st place, gold medalist(s)	2nd place, silver medalist(s)	3rd place, bronze medalist(s)	Total
1	Serbia and Montenegro	2	0	1	3
2	Italy	1	1	2	4
3	Croatia	1	1	0	2
4	France	0	1	0	1
4	Spain	0	1	0	1
6	Slovenia	0	0	1	1
Total		4	4	4	12
