= Table tennis at the 2009 Mediterranean Games =

The Table Tennis Competition at the 2009 Mediterranean Games was held in Pescara, Italy.

== Men's competition ==
=== Men's singles ===
Rank	Final
1st place, gold medalist(s)	Panagiotis Gionis (GRE)
2nd place, silver medalist(s)	Andrej Gaćina (CRO)
3rd place, bronze medalist(s)	Carlos Machado (ESP)

=== Men's team ===
Rank	Final
1st place, gold medalist(s)	Emmanuel Lebesson (FRA); Adrien Mattenet (FRA)
2nd place, silver medalist(s)	Roko Tošić (CRO); Andrej Gaćina (CRO)
3rd place, bronze medalist(s)	Aleksandar Karakašević (SRB); Slobodan Grujić (SRB)

== Women's competition ==
=== Women's singles ===
Rank	Final
1st place, gold medalist(s)	Melek Hu (TUR)
2nd place, silver medalist(s)	Li Xue (FRA)
3rd place, bronze medalist(s)	Aikaterini Ntoulaki (GRE)

=== Women's team ===
Rank	Final
1st place, gold medalist(s)	Nikoleta Stefanova (ITA); Laura Negrisoli (ITA); Tan Wenling (ITA)
2nd place, silver medalist(s)	Carole Grundısch (FRA); Li Xue (FRA)
3rd place, bronze medalist(s)	Zhu Fang (ESP); Galyna Dvorak (ESP); Sara Ramírez (ESP)

== Medal table ==
Place	Nation	1st place, gold medalist(s)	2nd place, silver medalist(s)	3rd place, bronze medalist(s)	Total
1	France	1	2	0	3
2	Greece	1	0	1	2
3	Italy	1	0	0	1
3	Turkey	1	0	0	1
5	Croatia	0	2	0	2
6	Spain	0	0	2	2
7	Serbia	0	0	1	1
Total		4	4	4	12
