= German Cup (table tennis) =

Table tennis competition in Germany

The German Cup (German: Deutsche Pokalmeisterschaft) is a competition for German club teams in table tennis. It has been held annually by the German Table Tennis Association since 1957 for men and since 1958 for women, and is one of the most important national competitions alongside the Table tennis Bundesliga.

== Men's champions ==
Season	Winners	Runners-up	Venue
1957–58	TTV Metelen	TSV Milbertshofen	München
1958–59	MTV Salzgitter	TTV Metelen	Mörfelden
1961–62	TTV Metelen	MTV Salzgitter	Bottrop
1962–63	PSV Stuttgart	DJK TuSA 06 Düsseldorf	Oberlar
1963–64	DJK TuSA 06 Düsseldorf	SV Moltkeplatz Essen	Essen
1964–65	DJK TuSA 06 Düsseldorf	VfL Osnabrück	Düsseldorf
1965–66	DJK TuSA 06 Düsseldorf	VfL Osnabrück	Osnabrück
1966–67	Post SV Augsburg	VfL Osnabrück	Augsburg
1967–68	SV Moltkeplatz Essen	Borussia Düsseldorf	Frechen
1968–69	VfL Osnabrück	Borussia Düsseldorf	Osnabrück
1969–70	Borussia Düsseldorf	VfL Osnabrück	Düsseldorf
1970–71	Borussia Düsseldorf	VfL Osnabrück	Nidderau
1971–72	Meidericher TTC	Hertha BSC	Stadthagen
1972–73	TTG Altena-Nachrodt	SG Eintracht Frankfurt	Velbert
1973–74	Borussia Düsseldorf	FTG Frankfurt	Reutlingen
1974–75	Borussia Düsseldorf	SSV Reutlingen	Bad Segeberg
1975–76	SSV Reutlingen	Hertha BSC	Löhne
1976–77	SSV Reutlingen	FTG Frankfurt	Frankenthal
1977–78	Borussia Düsseldorf	TTC Calw	Süßen
1978–79	Borussia Düsseldorf	TTC Calw	Rinteln
1979–80	SSV Heinzelmann Reutlingen	Borussia Düsseldorf	Reutlingen
1980–81	SSV Heinzelmann Reutlingen	TTC GW Bad Hamm	Hattersheim
1981–82	Borussia Düsseldorf	TTC Heusenstamm	Altena
1982–83	TTC Simex Jülich	TTC Heusenstamm	Jülich
1983–84	Borussia Düsseldorf	SSV Reutlingen	Göppingen
1984–85	ATSV Saarbrücken	TTC Simex Jülich	Saarlouis
1985–86	ATSV Saarbrücken	TTC Zugbrücke Grenzau	Bad Kreuznach
1986–87	TTC Zugbrücke Grenzau	BG Steiner Optik Bayreuth	Bayreuth
1987–88	Borussia Düsseldorf	Spvg Steinhagen	Steinhagen
1988–89	ATSV Saarbrücken	SSV Reutlingen	St. Ingbert
1989–90	Borussia Düsseldorf	TTC Zugbrücke Grenzau	Bonn
1990–91	Borussia Düsseldorf	ATSV Saarbrücken	Pirmasens
1991–92	VfB-TT im VfB Lübeck	TTC Zugbrücke Grenzau	Lübbecke
1992–93	TTC Zugbrücke Grenzau	Spvg Steinhagen	Aachen
1993–94	Borussia Düsseldorf	TTC Zugbrücke Grenzau	Bonn
1994–95	Borussia Düsseldorf	TTC Zugbrücke Grenzau	Grenzau
1995–96	Borussia Düsseldorf	TTF Liebherr Ochsenhausen	Aachen
1996–97	Borussia Düsseldorf	TTC Zugbrücke Grenzau	Aachen
1997–98	TTV Gönnern	TTC Frickenhausen	Rotenburg an der Fulda
1998–99	Borussia Düsseldorf	TTF Liebherr Ochsenhausen	Würzburg
1999–2000	Borussia Düsseldorf	TTF Bad Honnef	Waiblingen
2000–01	TTC Zugbrücke Grenzau	TTC SIG Combibloc Jülich	Fulda
2001–02	TTV RE-BAU Gönnern	Borussia Düsseldorf	Dillenburg
2002–03	TTF Liebherr Ochsenhausen	TTV RE-BAU Gönnern	Jülich
2003–04	TTF Liebherr Ochsenhausen	TTV RE-BAU Gönnern	Dillenburg
2004–05	TTF Liebherr Ochsenhausen	TTV RE-BAU Gönnern	Jülich
2005–06	TTC Frickenhausen	TTF Liebherr Ochsenhausen	Dillenburg
2006–07	TTC Zugbrücke Grenzau	Müller Würzburger Hofbräu	Jülich
2007–08	Borussia Düsseldorf	Werder Bremen	Hamm
2008–09	SV Plüderhausen	Werder Bremen	Hannover
2009–10	Borussia Düsseldorf	TTF Liebherr Ochsenhausen	Stuttgart
2010–11	Borussia Düsseldorf	TTF Liebherr Ochsenhausen	Stuttgart
2011–12	1. FC Saarbrücken	SV Plüderhausen	Stuttgart
2012–13	Borussia Düsseldorf	TTC RhönSprudel Fulda-Maberzell	Stuttgart
2013–14	Borussia Düsseldorf	TTC RhönSprudel Fulda-Maberzell	Stuttgart
2014–15	Borussia Düsseldorf	TTC RhönSprudel Fulda-Maberzell	Fulda
2015–16	Borussia Düsseldorf	TTC RhönSprudel Fulda-Maberzell	Neu-Ulm
2016–17	Borussia Düsseldorf	1. FC Saarbrücken	Neu-Ulm
2017–18	Borussia Düsseldorf	1. FC Saarbrücken	Neu-Ulm
2018–19	TTF Liebherr Ochsenhausen	Werder Bremen	Neu-Ulm
2019–20	ASV Grünwettersbach	TTF Liebherr Ochsenhausen	Neu-Ulm
2020–21	Borussia Düsseldorf	TTF Liebherr Ochsenhausen	Neu-Ulm
2021–22	1. FC Saarbrücken	Borussia Düsseldorf	Neu-Ulm
2022–23	TTC Neu-Ulm	Borussia Düsseldorf	Neu-Ulm
2023–24	Borussia Düsseldorf	1. FC Saarbrücken	Neu-Ulm
2024–25	TTF Liebherr Ochsenhausen	1. FC Saarbrücken	Neu-Ulm
2024–26	1. FC Saarbrücken	TTC RhönSprudel Fulda-Maberzell	Neu-Ulm

== Women's champions ==
Season	Winners	Runners-up	Venue
1958–59	SG Eintracht Frankfurt	DTC Kaiserberg	Duisburg
1960–61	TK Hannover	DTC Kaiserberg	Hannover
1962–63	Kieler TTK Grün-Weiß	DTC Kaiserberg	Oberlar
1963–64	DTC Kaiserberg	Kieler TTK Grün-Weiß	Essen
1964–65	DTC Kaiserberg	Kieler TTK Grün-Weiß	Düsseldorf
1965–66	DTC Kaiserberg	Kieler TTK Grün-Weiß	Duisburg
1966–67	DTC Kaiserberg	Kieler TTK Grün-Weiß	Kiel
1967–68	DTC Kaiserberg	Kieler TTK Grün-Weiß	Andernach
1968–69	DTC Kaiserberg	Kieler TTK Grün-Weiß	Windecken
1969–70	Kieler TTK Grün-Weiß	DSC Kaiserberg	Asbach
1970–71	DSC Kaiserberg	TTC Ramsharde	Flensburg
1971–72	DSC Kaiserberg	Gießener SV	Osnabrück
1972–73	TTG Altena-Nachrodt	TTVg WRW Kleve	Schwalmstadt
1973–74	TTC Ramsharde	DSC Kaiserberg	Reutlingen
1974–75	TSV Nord Harrislee	DSC Kaiserberg	Bad Segeberg
1975–76	DSC Kaiserberg	Kieler TTK Grün-Weiß	Löhne
1976–77	DSC Kaiserberg	TSV Nord Harrislee	Frankenthal
1977–78	DSC Kaiserberg	TTV Rinteln	Süßen
1978–79	DSC Kaiserberg	VSC 1862 Donauwörth	Rinteln
1979–80	TSV Kronshagen	DSC Kaiserberg	Hagen
1980–81	DSC Kaiserberg	TSV Kronshagen	Windecken
1981–82	DSC Kaiserberg	TSV Kronshagen	Donauwörth
1982–83	DSC Kaiserberg	TTVg WRW Kleve	Hagen a.T.W.
1983–84	Kieler TTK Grün-Weiß	DSC Kaiserberg	Kleve
1984–85	ATSV Saarbrücken	FTG Frankfurt	Linden
2013–14	TTC Berlin Eastside	TTG Bingen/Münster-Sarmsheim	Baiersbronn
2014–15	TTC Berlin Eastside	TTG Bingen/Münster-Sarmsheim	Berlin
2015–16	TTC Berlin Eastside	TUSEM Essen	Hannover
2016–17	TTC Berlin Eastside	TTG Bingen/Münster-Sarmsheim	Hannover
2017–18	TTC Berlin Eastside	TuS Bad Driburg	Hannover
2018–19	SV-DJK Kolbermoor	TTC Berlin Eastside	Berlin
2019–20	TTC Berlin Eastside	SV-DJK Kolbermoor	Pforzheim
2020–21	TTC Berlin Eastside	SV-DJK Kolbermoor	Berlin
2021–22	SV-DJK Kolbermoor	TSV Langstadt 1909	Hannover
2022–23	TTC Berlin Eastside	TSV Langstadt 1909	Berlin
2023–24	TTC Berlin Eastside	SV-DJK Kolbermoor	Berlin
