= TTF Liebherr Ochsenhausen =

German table tennis club

Tischtennisfreunde Liebherr Ochsenhausen
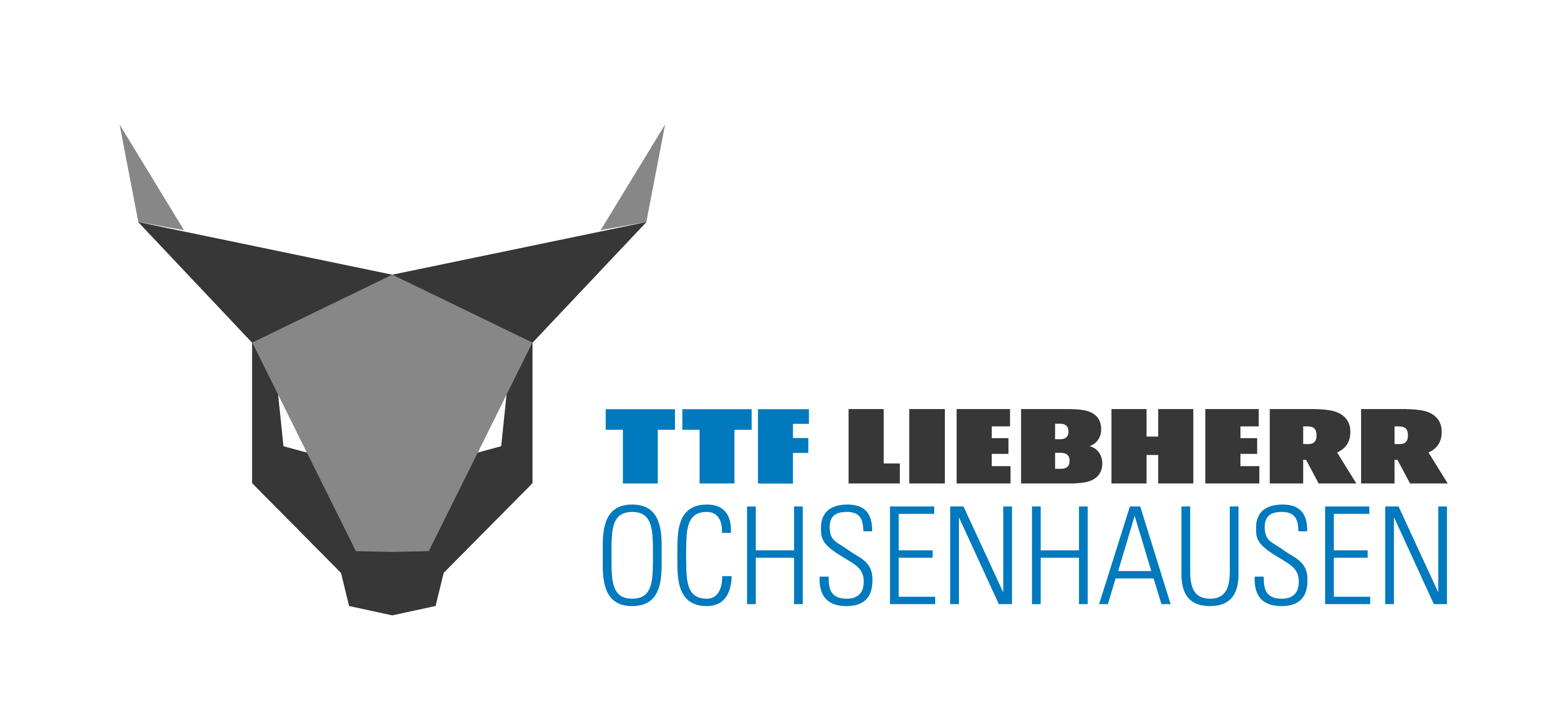
- Founded: 1956; 70 years ago
- League: Tischtennis-Bundesliga
- Home ground: Dr.-Hans-Liebherr-Halle
- 2023–24: 6th of 11
- Website: https://ttfo.de/

Tischtennisfreunde Liebherr Ochsenhausen is a table tennis club based in Ochsenhausen, Germany. The men's team plays in the Bundesliga. The main sponsor is the company Liebherr.

== History ==
The club was founded in 1956. After the players Jindřich Panský (CSSR), Rudi Stumper and Erwin Becker strengthened the team in 1989, the club managed to advance from the regional league to the 2nd Bundesliga under manager Rainer Ihle (1955-2013). The club first played in the Bundesliga (the top tier of German table tennis) during the 1994–1995 season. The club has since become one of the most successful and well-known teams in German table tennis, consistently competing at the highest level. In 1996, Ochsenhausen defeated the team from TSV Maxell-Sontheim in the final of the ETTU Cup. The 1996/97 season was very successful, with the team winning the German championship and also defending the ETTU Cup.

== Honors ==
- 1. Tischtennis-Bundesliga: 5
  - Gold: 1997, 2000, 2004, 2019, 2026
- German Cup: 5
  - Gold: 2002, 2003, 2004, 2019, 2025
- ETTU Cup: 2
  - Gold: 1996, 1997

== Team ==
=== Current squad ===
Squad for the 2024–25 season

- (Brazil) Hugo Calderano
- (Portugal) Tiago Abiodun
- (Brazil) Leonardo Iizuka
- (France) Simon Gauzy
- (Japan) Shunsuke Togami
- (Romania) Bogdan Pugna

=== Notable players ===
- (France) Can Akkuzu
- (Portugal) Tiago Apolónia
- (China) Chen Xinhua
- (Taiwan) Chuang Chih-yuan
- (Romania) Adrian Crișan
- (Poland) Jakub Dyjas
- (Austria) Stefan Fegerl
- (Germany) Ruwen Filus
- (Germany) Peter Franz
- (Portugal) Marcos Freitas
- (Croatia) Andrej Gaćina
- (Portugal) João Geraldo
- (Sweden) Pär Gerell
- (South Korea) Jang Woo-jin
- (United States) Kanak Jha
- (Japan) Seiya Kishikawa
- (Russia) Fedor Kuzmin
- (China) Kong Linghui
- (Hong Kong) Leung Chu Yan
- (Sweden) Jens Lundqvist
- (China) Ma Wenge
- (Russia) Dmitry Mazunov
- (Portugal) João Monteiro
- (Czech Republic) Jindřich Panský
- (Sweden) Jörgen Persson
- (England) Liam Pitchford
- (Germany) Richard Prause
- (Spain) Álvaro Robles
- (Ukraine) Borys Rozenberh
- (South Korea) Ryu Seung-min
- (Russia) Kirill Skachkov
- (Russia) Alexey Smirnov
- (Hungary) Dániel Zwickl

== Youth development ==
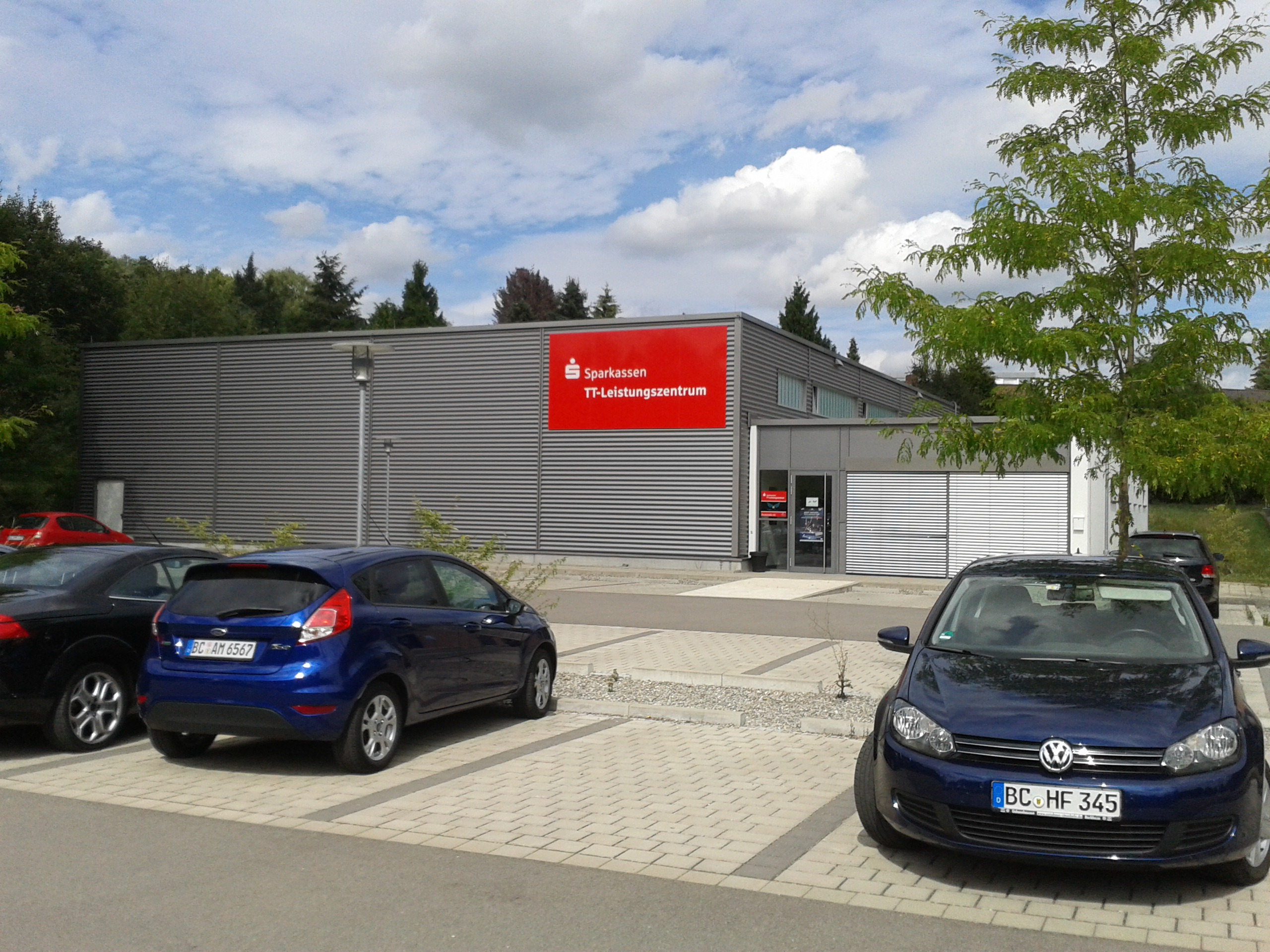
Sparkassen Table Tennis Performance Center

The club is known for its good youth training. The Sparkassen Table Tennis Performance Center was built and opened in April 2012 at the initiative of former president Rainer Ihle and manager Kristijan Pejinovic. The Liebherr Masters College (LMC) is also based here. Professional trainers educate regional, national and international talents here and, if successful, transfer them to partner clubs with the aim of integrating these talents into the Bundesliga team at a later stage.
