= Martin Bratanov =

Belgian table tennis player (born 1974)

Personal information
- Nationality: Belgium
- Born: 20 September 1974 (age 51) Bulgaria
Medal record
Representing Belgium
World Table Tennis Championships
Silver medal – second place	2001	Men's Team

Martin Bratanov (Bulgarian: Мартин Братанов) is a Bulgarian-born male former international table tennis player from Belgium.

He won a silver medal at the 2001 World Table Tennis Championships in the Swaythling Cup (men's team event) with Marc Closset, Andras Podpinka, Jean-Michel Saive and Philippe Saive for Belgium.

== See also ==
- List of table tennis players
- List of World Table Tennis Championships medalists
