= ETTU Europe Trophy =

Table tennis tournament

The ETTU Europe Trophy is the third most important continental tournament for clubs in European table tennis, after the European Champions League and the ETTU Cup. The European Table Tennis Union (ETTU) has organized this cup since the 2021–22 season for men and women teams.

== Results ==
=== Men's competition ===
Season	Winners	Runners-up
2022	(Czech Republic) Tesla Batteries Havířov	(Spain) Arteal
2023	(Greece) Olympiacos	(Poland) Global Pharma Orlicz 1924 Suchedniów
2024	(Greece) Panathinaikos	(Spain) Arteal
2025	(Montenegro) STK Novi	(Slovakia) MSK Čadca
2026	(Greece) Panathinaikos	(Spain) Olot

==== Total ====
Club	Titles	Years
(Greece) Panathinaikos	2	2024, 2026
(Czech Republic) Tesla Batteries Havířov	1	2022
(Greece) Olympiacos	1	2023
(Montenegro) STK Novi	1	2025

=== Women's competition ===
Season	Winners	Runners-up
2022	(Greece) Panathinaikos	(Czech Republic) Moravský Krumlov
2023	(France) Joué-lès-Tours	(Greece) SARISES Flórinas
2024	(Croatia) Dr. Časl	(France) Pongiste Lyssois Lille Métropole
2025	(Croatia) Aquaestil Duga Resa	(Serbia) Josip Kolumbo
2026	(Spain) Indiana Games	(Serbia) Josip Kolumbo

==== Total ====
Club	Titles	Years
(Greece) Panathinaikos	1	2022
(France) Joué-lès-Tours	1	2023
(Croatia) Dr. Časl	1	2024
(Croatia) Aquaestil Duga Resa	1	2025
(Spain) Indiana Games	1	2026

== See also ==
- European Table Tennis Union
- List of table tennis players
