= Nikoleta Stefanova =

Bulgarian-Italian table tennis player

Personal information
- Full name: Nikoleta Stefanova
- Nationality: Bulgarian/Italian
- Born: April 22, 1984 (age 42) Teteven, Bulgaria
- Height: 1.70 m (5 ft 7 in)
- Weight: 60 kg (132 lb; 9 st 6 lb)

Sport
- Sport: Table tennis
Medal record
Women's table tennis
Representing Italy
European Championships
Gold medal – first place	2003 Courmayeur	Team
Silver medal – second place	2008 Saint-Petersburg	Doubles
Silver medal – second place	2009 Stuttgart	Doubles
Bronze medal – third place	2003 Courmayeur	Singles
Bronze medal – third place	2005 Aarhus	Doubles
Bronze medal – third place	2007 Belgrade	Doubles
Mediterranean Games
Gold medal – first place	2009 Pescara	Team
Silver medal – second place	2022 Oran	Team
Bronze medal – third place	2005 Almería	Singles
Bronze medal – third place	2005 Almería	Doubles

Nikoleta Stefanova (born 22 April 1984) is a Bulgarian-born female table tennis player competing for Italy. From 2003 she won several medals in single, double, and team events in the Table Tennis European Championships.

She competed at the 2008 Summer Olympics, reaching the second round of the singles competition. She competed in both singles and doubles at the 2004 Summer Olympics.

== See also ==
- List of table tennis players
