= Majid Ehteshamzadeh =

Iranian table tennis player

Majidreza Ehteshamzadeh (Persian: مجیدرضا احتشام‌زاده, born 14 December 1956) is an Iranian table tennis player. He participated in the 2000 Summer Olympics.
