= Magnus Molin =

Swedish table tennis player

Personal information
- Nationality: Swedish
- Born: 21 August 1979 (age 46)
Medal record
Men's table tennis
Representing Sweden
World Championships
| Bronze medal – third place | 2001 Osaka | Team |

Magnus Molin (born 21 August 1979) is a Swedish former international table tennis player.

He won a bronze medal at the 2001 World Table Tennis Championships in the Swaythling Cup (men's team event) with Fredrik Håkansson, Peter Karlsson, Jörgen Persson and Jan-Ove Waldner for Sweden.

He also won two European Table Tennis Championships gold medals in 2000 and 2002.

== See also ==
- List of table tennis players
- List of World Table Tennis Championships medalists
