= Andrej Gaćina =

Croatian table tennis player

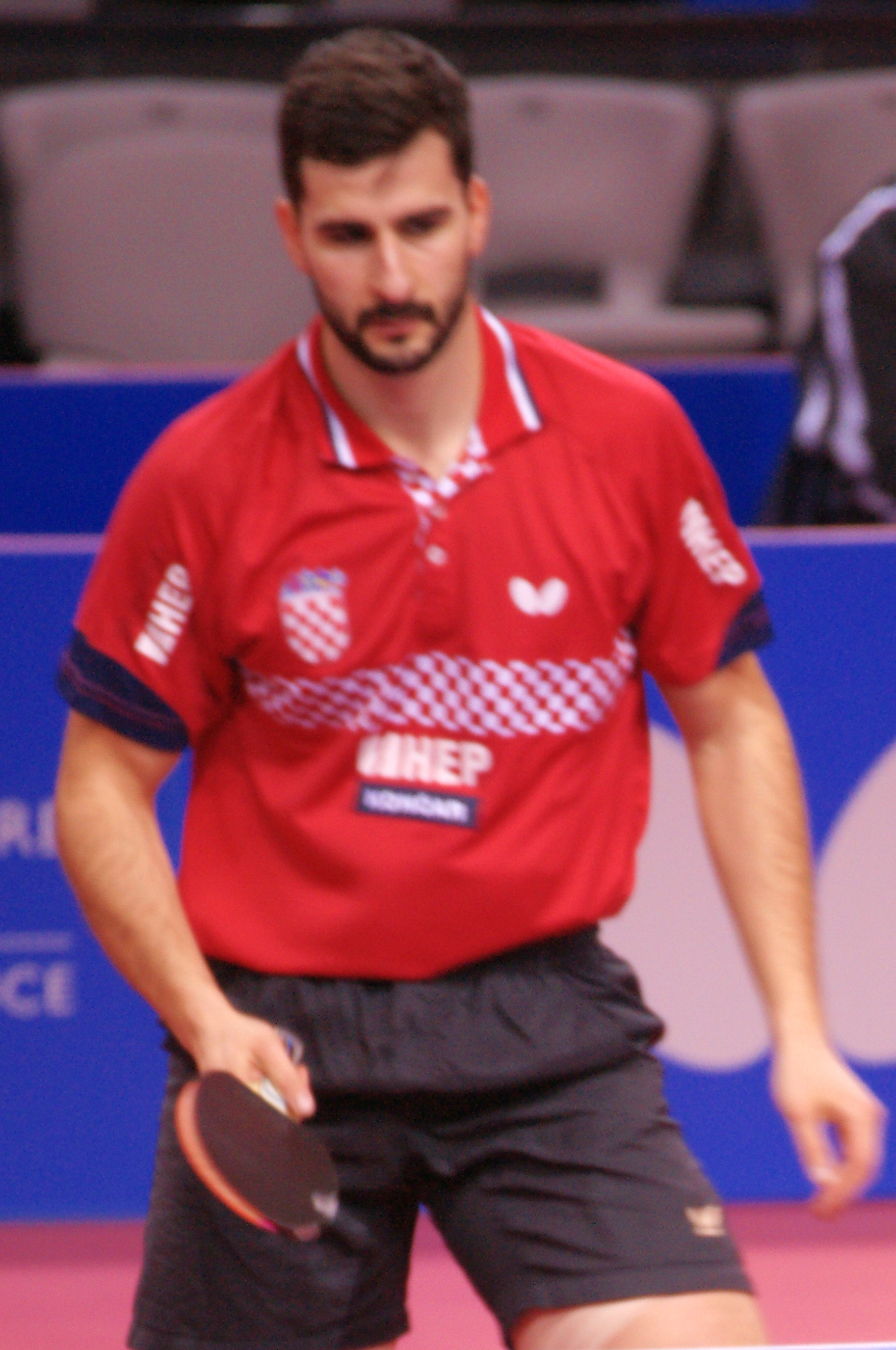
- Gaćina in 2017

Personal information
- Nationality: Croatia
- Born: 21 May 1986 (age 40) Zadar, SR Croatia, SFR Yugoslavia
- Height: 1.86 m (6 ft 1 in)
- Weight: 82 kg (181 lb)

Sport
- Sport: Table tennis
- Club: (Greece) Olympiacos
- Playing style: Attacker
- Highest ranking: 18 (February 2016)
- Current ranking: 60 (5 October 2026)
Medal record
Table tennis
Representing Croatia
European Championships
Gold medal – first place	2011 Gdansk-Sopot	Doubles
Silver medal – second place	2007 Belgrade	Team
Mediterranean Games
Silver medal – second place	2009 Pescara	Singles
Silver medal – second place	2009 Pescara	Team

Andrej Gaćina (born 21 May 1986) is a male table tennis player from Croatia.

== Career ==
Since 2007, he has won two medals in doubles and team events in the Table Tennis European Championships.

As of August 2016, he was the number nineteenth player in the world. On club level he competes for Olympiacos, with whom he won the ETTU Europe Trophy in 2023. In 2021 he played for Apuania Carrara Tennistavolo and in 2022 he won Europe Cup, Supercoppa italiana and Coppa Italia.

== See also ==
- List of table tennis players
