= Slobodan Grujić =

Serbian table tennis player

Personal information
- Full name: Slobodan Grujić
- Nationality: Serbia
- Born: 24 August 1973 (age 52) Novi Sad, SR Serbia, SFR Yugoslavia
- Height: 1.79 m (5 ft 10 in)

Sport
- Sport: Table tennis
- Playing style: All round player
Medal record
Men's table tennis
Representing Yugoslavia / Serbia and Montenegro / Serbia
ITTF World Tour Grand Finals
Bronze medal – third place	1996 Tianjin	Doubles
Bronze medal – third place	2001 Hainan	Doubles
European Championships
Bronze medal – third place	1992 Stuttgart	Doubles
Bronze medal – third place	2003 Courmayeur	Doubles
European Nations Cup
Bronze medal – third place	1996 Bayreuth	Team
Mediterranean Games
Gold medal – first place	2001 Tunis	Doubles
Gold medal – first place	2005 Almería	Doubles
Silver medal – second place	1997 Bari	Doubles
Bronze medal – third place	1997 Bari	Singles
Bronze medal – third place	2001 Tunis	Singles
Bronze medal – third place	2005 Almería	Singles
Bronze medal – third place	2009 Pescara	Team

Slobodan Grujić (born 24 July 1973 in Novi Sad, Serbia, Yugoslavia) is a male Serbian table tennis player. He plays for Fenerbahçe TT since 2007 and also played for Novi Sad TT in Serbia and TTV RE-BAU Gönnern in Germany.

== Major achievements ==
- 2004–05 Champions League Champion with TTV RE-BAU Gönnern
- 2005–06 Champions League Champion with TTV RE-BAU Gönnern
- 1 time 3rd place of European Championship
- 3 time Turkish Champion
- 4 times Yugoslavian Champion
- 2008–09 ETTU Cup Runner-up
