= Josef Plachý (table tennis) =

Czech table tennis player

Personal information
- Nationality: Czech
- Born: 1 April 1971 (age 55) Kladno, Czechoslovakia

Sport
- Sport: Table tennis

Josef Plachý (born 1 April 1971) is a Czech table tennis player. He competed at the 1996 Summer Olympics and the 2000 Summer Olympics.
