= Philippe Saive =

Belgian table tennis player

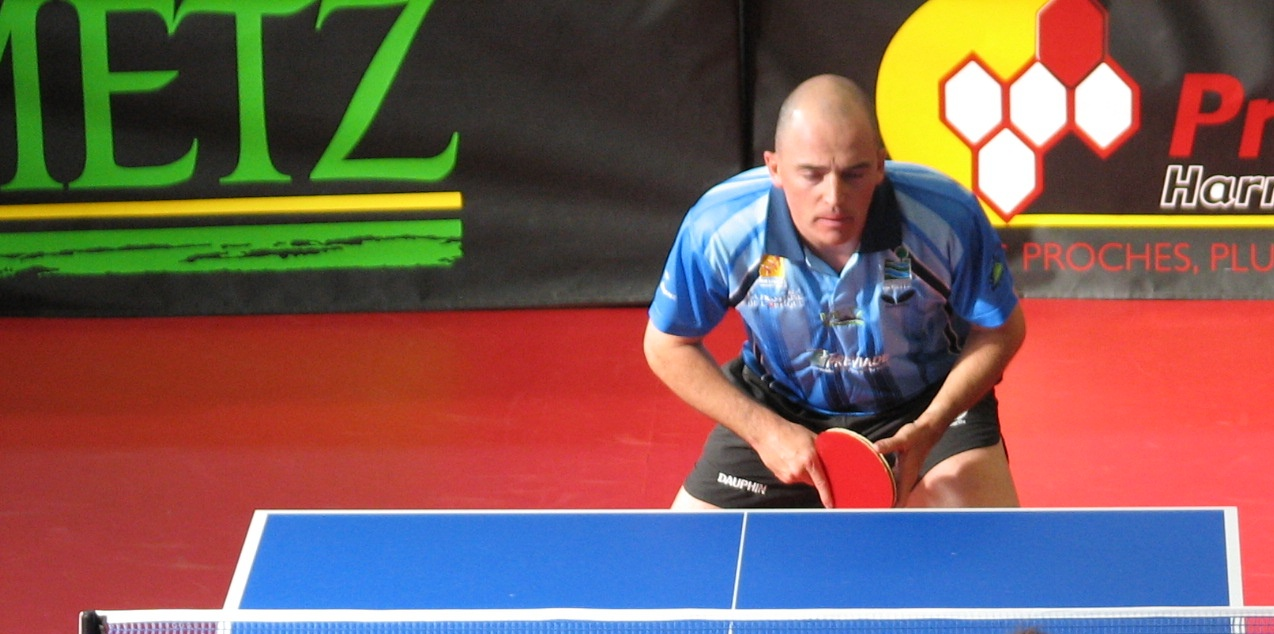

Personal information
- Nationality: Belgium
- Born: 2 July 1971 (age 54) Liège
Medal record
Representing Belgium
World Table Tennis Championships
Silver medal – second place	2001	Men's Team

Philippe Saive is a male former international table tennis player from Belgium.

== Table tennis career ==
He won a silver medal at the 2001 World Table Tennis Championships in the Swaythling Cup (men's team event) with Martin Bratanov, Marc Closset, Andras Podpinka, and Jean-Michel Saive (his brother) for Belgium.

He competed in three Olympic Games in 1992, 1996, and 2000.

== Personal life ==
He is the younger brother of retired professional table tennis player Jean-Michel Saive.

== See also ==
- List of table tennis players
- List of World Table Tennis Championships medalists
