= Kaii Yoshida =

Japanese table tennis player

Kaii Yoshida (Japanese: 吉田 海偉; Chinese: 宋海伟; pinyin: Sòng Hǎiwěi; born 16 May 1981 in Xinji, Hebei, China) is a Chinese-born Japanese table tennis player who is ranked among the top fifty athletes in his sport.

Yoshida started playing table tennis at the age of 7 at the Hebei Institute of Physical Education under coach Liu Wenqing. He is a right handed pen hold grip player. Unlike the Chinese player Wang Hao, he only uses one side of his racket. Yoshida was spotted by a Japanese Coach in 1997. He moved to Japan and commenced his international career in competitive table tennis after completing 3 years of tertiary education and 2 years of university education. In 2004 he became a Japanese citizen.

As a singles player, Yoshida was ranked 21st in the world as of July 2010 His highest ranking was in June 2010, when he was 20th. He won his 1st Men's Singles title in the 2006 ITTF Pro Tour Serbian Open. More recently, he achieved a 3rd position in the 2008 ITTF Pro Tour Chile Open. Yoshida is also a key player for Men's Team and Doubles, and Mixed Doubles events. Together with his team, he managed to achieve 2nd position in the 2007 ASIAN Table Tennis Championships in Yangzhou, China. In addition, they clinched third position in the 2008 World Table Tennis Team Championships in Guangdong, China.

== Achievements ==
Event	Medal	Date	Competition
2004
Men's doubles	Silver	3 July 2004	ITTF Pro Tour US Open; Chicago, Illinois, USA
2005
Men's Team	Bronze	2005	ASIAN Table Tennis Championships; Jeju-do, South Korea
Mixed doubles	Bronze	2005	ASIAN Table Tennis Championships; Jeju-do, South Korea
2006
Men's doubles	Bronze	24 June 2006	ITTF Pro Tour Brazilian Open; São Paulo, Brazil
Men's singles	Gold	22 October 2006	ITTF Pro Tour Serbian Open; Belgrade, Serbia
2007
Men's Team	Bronze	23 September 2007	ASIAN Table Tennis Championships; Yangzhou, China
2008
Men's Team	Bronze	1 March 2008	Evergrande Real Estate 2008 World Team Table Tennis Championships; Guangzhou, China
Men's singles	Bronze	27 April 2008	ITTF Pro Tour Chile Open; Santiago, Chile
2009
Men's singles	Bronze	14 June 2009	ITTF Pro Tour Japan Open; Wakayama, Japan
Men's Team	Silver	19 November 2009	ASIAN Table Tennis Championships; Lucknow, India
Men's Team	Silver	6 December 2009	East Asian Games; Santiago, Chile
2010
Men's Team	Bronze	30 May 2010	LIEBHERR 2010 World Team Table Tennis Championships; Moscow, Russia
