= Bundesliga (table tennis) =

Highest level league of table tennis in Germany

Bundesliga（German: Tischtennis-Bundesliga）is the top league in the German table tennis league system.

The first Bundesliga was held in the 1966/1967 season with 8 teams. Since then the Bundesliga has been held every season with a varying number of teams. In the 2025/2026 season, 12 teams will participate in Bundesliga.

== Current Rules ==
A season is divided into two phases: the Rankings and the Playoffs. Prior to the start of the season, each team will need to confirm the registration of 3 to 6 players and the positions of these players, i.e. 1st player, 2nd player, 3rd player, 4th player, 5th player, 6th player. where the 4th to 6th down players are substitutes.

All matches are group matches, where each group match is divided into 5 games in a 3 sets to 2 wins system. The first four games are solos and the fifth games are doubles, with the 1st player not being allowed to play in the doubles. The players for the double in each match shall be determined at the end of the second game of this match.

Game	Form	Home	Away
G1	solo	1st player	2nd player
G2	solo	2nd player	1st player
G3	solo	3rd player	3rd player
G4	solo	1st player or a substitute	1st player or a substitute
G5	double	double players	double players

In the Ranking Phase, each team will play a home and away group match against every other team in Bundesliga.

The top 4 teams in the ranking phase advance to the playoff phase, which consists of two rounds. The winner of the playoff rounds wins the Bundesliga title.

In the first playoff round, the 1st ranked team plays the 4th ranked team and the 2nd ranked team plays the 3rd ranked team. Up to three matches will be played between each pair of teams facing each other in the first playoff round, with the team firstly losing two matches being eliminated. The first two matches alternating between home and away, with the team with the higher ranking in the rankings designating the venue for the first match, and the third team match taking place at the home of the team with the higher ranking in the ranking phase.

The second playoff round, also known as the final, is held at a neutral venue and only one match is played.

== Teams in Season 2025/2026 ==
In the 2025/2026 season, there will be the following 12 teams competing in the Bundesliga.

Team	City	Result 24/25
1. FC Saarbrücken-TT	Saarbrücken	3
ASC Grünwettersbach	Karlsruhe	7
Borussia Düsseldorf	Düsseldorf	1
BV Borussia 09 Dortmund	Dortmund	9
Post SV Mühlhausen	Mühlhausen	10
SV Werder Bremen	Bremen	6
TSV Bad Königshofen	Bad Königshofen	4
TTC OE Bad Homburg 1987	Bad Homburg	11
TTC RhönSprudel Fulda-Maberzell	Fulda	5
TTC Schwalbe Bergneustadt	Reichshof	8
TTC Zugbrücke Grenzau	Höhr-Grenzhausen	12
TTF Liebherr Ochsenhausen	Ochsenhausen	2 (C)

Here "P" means that the team is promoted from Bundesliga 2 and "C" means the team is the champion.

== Championship Statistics ==
The data is taken from the corresponding German Wikipedia.

Number	Team	Seasons
33	Borussia Düsseldorf	1969, 1970, 1971, 1974, 1975, 1978, 1979, 1980, 1981, 1982, 1986, 1988, 1990, 1992, 1993, 1995, 1996, 1998, 2003, 2008, 2009, 2010, 2011, 2012, 2014, 2015, 2016, 2017, 2018, 2021, 2022, 2023, 2024
6	TTC Zugbrücke Grenzau	1987, 1991, 1994, 1999, 2001, 2002
5	TTF Liebherr Ochsenhausen	1997, 2000, 2004, 2019, 2025
4	ATSV Saarbrücken	1983, 1984, 1985, 1989
2	TTC Frickenhausen	2006, 2007
2	TTC Altena	1973, 1976
1	VfL Osnabrück	1968
1	1. FC Saarbrücken-TT	2020
1	SV Werder Bremen	2013
1	Müller Würzburger Hofbräu	2005
1	SSV Reutlingen 05	1977
1	Mettmanner TV	1972
1	TuSa 08 Düsseldorf	1967
