= Greece at the 2004 Summer Olympics =

- IOC code: GRE
- NOC: Hellenic Olympic Committee
- Website: www.hoc.gr (in Greek and English)

in Athens Greece
- Competitors: 426 in 27 sports
- Flag bearer: Pyrros Dimas
- Medals Ranked 15th: Gold 6 Silver 6 Bronze 4 Total 16

Summer Olympics appearances (overview)
- 1896; 1900; 1904; 1908; 1912; 1920; 1924; 1928; 1932; 1936; 1948; 1952; 1956; 1960; 1964; 1968; 1972; 1976; 1980; 1984; 1988; 1992; 1996; 2000; 2004; 2008; 2012; 2016; 2020; 2024; 2028

Other related appearances
- 1906 Intercalated Games

Greece was the host country for the 2004 Summer Olympics in Athens, from 13 to 29 August 2004. As the progenitor nation and in keeping with tradition, Greek athletes have competed at every Summer Olympics in the modern era, alongside Australia, Great Britain, and Switzerland. The Hellenic Olympic Committee fielded a total of 426 athletes to the Games, 215 men and 211 women, and had achieved automatic qualification places in all sports, with the exception of men's and women's field hockey. It was also the nation's largest team ever in Summer Olympic history since the first modern Games were held in 1896.

Unlike most of the Olympic opening ceremonies, where the country enters first as a tribute to its history as the birthplace of the ancient Olympics and the host of the first modern Olympics in 1896, the country entered the last in the opening ceremony as the host nation. However, the Greek flag-bearer entered first, honoring the traditional role of Greece in opening the Parade of Nations, and the whole Greek delegation entered at the end, the traditional place for the host nation.

Greece left the Summer Olympic Games with a total of sixteen medals (six gold, six silver, and four bronze), finishing within the top fifteen position in the overall medal rankings. At least a single medal was awarded to the Greek team in ten sports; five of them came from the track and field, including two prestigious golds. Greece also topped the medal tally in diving, gymnastics, judo, and sailing. Three Greek athletes added Olympic medals to their career hardware from the previous editions.

Among the nation's medalists were track hurdler Fani Halkia, race walker Athanasia Tsoumeleka, teenage judoka Ilias Iliadis, and diving duo Thomas Bimis and Nikolaos Siranidis, who won Greece's first ever Olympic gold medals in their respective disciplines. Emerging as one of the greatest Olympic weightlifters of all time with three Olympic titles, Pyrros Dimas ended his illustrious sporting career with a bronze medal effort in the men's light heavyweight category on his fourth and final Olympic appearance. Meanwhile, Nikolaos Kaklamanakis, who won the gold in Atlanta eight years earlier, and lit the Olympic flame at the conclusion of the opening ceremony, picked up his second medal with a silver in men's Mistral windsurfing.

== Medalists ==
Medals by sport
Sport	1st place, gold medalist(s)	2nd place, silver medalist(s)	3rd place, bronze medalist(s)	Total
Athletics	2	2	1	5
Sailing	1	1	0	2
Diving	1	0	0	1
Gymnastics	1	0	0	1
Judo	1	0	0	1
Taekwondo	0	2	0	2
Water polo	0	1	0	1
Rowing	0	0	1	1
Weightlifting	0	0	1	1
Wrestling	0	0	1	1
Total	6	6	4	16

Medal	Name	Sport	Event	Date
Gold	Thomas Bimis; Nikolaos Siranidis	Diving	Men's 3 m synchronized springboard	August 16
Gold	Ilias Iliadis	Judo	Men's -81 kg	August 17
Gold	Sofia Bekatorou; Emilia Tsoulfa	Sailing	Women's 470	August 21
Gold	Dimosthenis Tampakos	Gymnastics	Men's rings	August 22
Gold	Athanasia Tsoumeleka	Athletics	Women's 20 km walk	August 23
Gold	Fani Halkia	Athletics	Women's 400 m hurdles	August 25
Silver	Anastasia Kelesidou	Athletics	Women's discus throw	August 21
Silver	Nikolaos Kaklamanakis	Sailing	Men's mistral	August 21
Silver	Hrysopiyi Devetzi	Athletics	Women's triple jump	August 23
Silver	Greece women's national water polo team: Dimitra Asilian; Georgia Ellinaki; Eftychia Karagianni; Angeliki Karapataki; Stavroula Kozompoli; Georgia Lara; Kyriaki Liosi; Antiopi Melidoni; Antonia Moraiti; Evangelia Moraitidou; Anthoula Mylonaki; Aikaterini Oikonomopoulou; Antigoni Roumpesi	Water polo	Women's tournament	August 26
Silver	Elisavet Mystakidou	Taekwondo	Women's -67 kg	August 27
Silver	Alexandros Nikolaidis	Taekwondo	Men's +80 kg	August 28
Bronze	Pyrros Dimas	Weightlifting	Men's -85 kg	August 21
Bronze	Vasileios Polymeros; Nikolaos Skiathitis	Rowing	Men's lightweight double sculls	August 22
Bronze	Artiom Kiouregkian	Wrestling	Men's Greco-Roman -55 kg	August 25
Bronze	Mirela Manjani	Athletics	Women's javelin throw	August 27

== Archery ==
As the host nation, Greece automatically receives the full allocation of six individual places, alongside entry to both the men's and women's team events.

Men

Athlete	Event	Ranking round		Round of 64	Round of 32	Round of 16	Quarterfinals	Semifinals	Final / BM	
Athlete	Event	Score	Seed	Opposition Score	Opposition Score	Opposition Score	Opposition Score	Opposition Score	Opposition Score	Rank
Georgios Kalogiannidis	Individual	601	58	Tsyrempilov (RUS); L 133–148	Did not advance					
Alexandros Karageorgiou	Individual	647	33	Rai (IND); W 147–143	Im D-H (KOR); L 159–171	Did not advance				
Apostolos Nanos	Individual	585	60	Jang Y-H (KOR); L 131–162	Did not advance					
Georgios Kalogiannidis; Alexandros Karageorgiou; Apostolos Nanos	Team	1833	13	—N/a		Ukraine; L 225–243	Did not advance			

Women

Athlete	Event	Ranking round		Round of 64	Round of 32	Round of 16	Quarterfinals	Semifinals	Final / BM	
Athlete	Event	Score	Seed	Opposition Score	Opposition Score	Opposition Score	Opposition Score	Opposition Score	Opposition Score	Rank
Evangelia Psarra	Individual	652	8	Galbraith (AUS); W 138–116	Şatır (TUR); W 163–161	Gallardo (ESP); W 160–152	Park S-H (KOR); L 101–111	Did not advance		
Elpida Romantzi	Individual	624	34	Schuh (FRA); W 151–143	Lee S-J (KOR); L 146–166	Did not advance				
Fotini Vavatsi	Individual	609	51	Berezhna (UKR); L 156–160	Did not advance					
Evangelia Psarra; Elpida Romantzi; Fotini Vavatsi	Team	1885	8	—N/a		United States; W 230–227	South Korea; L 232–244	Did not advance		

== Athletics ==
In athletics, the Greek team did not receive any automatic places for representing the host nation, as they had done in other sports. Greek athletes have so far achieved qualifying standards in the following athletics events (up to a maximum of 3 athletes in each event at the 'A' Standard, and 1 at the 'B' Standard).

Key

- Note–Ranks given for track events are within the athlete's heat only
- Q = Qualified for the next round
- q = Qualified for the next round as a fastest loser or, in field events, by position without achieving the qualifying target
- NR = National record
- N/A = Round not applicable for the event
- Bye = Athlete not required to compete in round

Men
Track & road events

Athlete	Event	Heat		Quarterfinal		Semifinal		Final	
Athlete	Event	Result	Rank	Result	Rank	Result	Rank	Result	Rank
Hristoforos Hoidis	100 m	DNS		Did not advance					
Georgios Theodoridis	100 m	10.32	6 q	10.36	5	Did not advance			
Anastasios Gousis	200 m	20.44	2 Q	20.46	2 Q	20.68	5	Did not advance	
Panagiotis Sarris	200 m	20.67	3 Q	20.92	7	Did not advance			
Stilianos Dimotsios	400 m	46.51	7	—N/a		Did not advance			
Panagiotis Stroubakos	800 m	1:47.69	7	—N/a		Did not advance			
Periklis Iakovakis	400 m hurdles	48.69	2 Q	—N/a		48.47	4	Did not advance	
Stilianos Dimotsios; Anastasios Gousis; Periklis Iakovakis; Panagiotis Sarris	4 × 400 m relay	3:04.27	6	—N/a				Did not advance	
Nikolaos Polias	Marathon	—N/a						2:17:56	24
Elefthérios Thanópoulos	20 km walk	—N/a						1:30:15	36
Georgios Argiropoulos	50 km walk	—N/a						4:17:25	39
Spiridon Kastanis	50 km walk	—N/a						DNF	
Theodoros Stamatopoulos	50 km walk	—N/a						DNF	

Field events

Athlete	Event	Qualification		Final	
Athlete	Event	Distance	Position	Distance	Position
Marios Evangelou	Pole vault	5.30	=33	Did not advance	
Dimitrios Filindras	Long jump	7.45	35	Did not advance	
Dimítrios Serélis	Long jump	NM	—	Did not advance	
Louis Tsatoumas	Long jump	7.81	22	Did not advance	
Hristos Meletoglou	Triple jump	17.08	8 Q	17.13	6
Savvas Panavoglou	Discus throw	58.47	22	Did not advance	
Alexandros Papadimitriou	Hammer throw	75.55	17	Did not advance	

Combined events – Decathlon

Athlete	Event	100 m	LJ	SP	HJ	400 m	110H	DT	PV	JT	1500 m	Final	Rank
Prodromos Korkizoglou	Result	10.86	7.07	14.81	1.94	51.16	14.96	46.07	4.70	53.05	5:17.00	7573	26
Prodromos Korkizoglou	Points	892	830	778	749	762	854	789	819	634	466	7573	26

Women
Track & road events

Athlete	Event	Heat		Quarterfinal		Semifinal		Final	
Athlete	Event	Result	Rank	Result	Rank	Result	Rank	Result	Rank
Olga Kaidantzi	200 m	23.11	3 Q	23.15	3 Q	23.30	8	Did not advance	
Konstadina Efedaki	1500 m	4:06.73	9 q	—N/a		4:09.37	12	Did not advance	
Maria Protopappa	5000 m	15:35.07	12	—N/a				Did not advance	
Flora Redoumi	100 m hurdles	13.14	5	—N/a		Did not advance			
Fani Halkia	400 m hurdles	53.85	1 Q	—N/a		52.77 OR	1 Q	52.82	1st place, gold medalist(s)
Maria Karastamati; Georgia Kokloni; Effrosíni Patsoú; Marina Vasarmidou	4 × 100 m relay	44.45	8	—N/a				Did not advance	
Hariklia Bouda; Dimitra Dova; Hrisoula Goudenoudi; Fani Halkia	4 × 400 m relay	3:26.70	2 Q	—N/a				3:45.70	8
Georgia Abatzidou	Marathon	—N/a						2:50:01	50
Hristina Kokotou	20 km walk	—N/a						1:35:43	31
Athina Papayianni	20 km walk	—N/a						1:30:37	10
Athanasia Tsoumeleka	20 km walk	—N/a						1:29.12	1st place, gold medalist(s)

Field events

Athlete	Event	Qualification		Final	
Athlete	Event	Distance	Position	Distance	Position
Nikolia Mitropoulou	High jump	1.85	31	Did not advance	
Afroditi Skafida	Pole vault	NM	—	Did not advance	
Yeoryia Tsiliggiri	Pole vault	Pole vault	4.30	=18	Did not advance
Ioanna Kafetzi	Long jump	6.49	16	Did not advance	
Stiliani Pilatou	Long jump	6.42	22	Did not advance	
Niki Xanthou	Long jump	6.31	31	Did not advance	
Hrysopiyi Devetzi	Triple jump	15.32 NR	1 Q	15.25	2nd place, silver medalist(s)
Athanasia Perra	Triple jump	13.19	33	Did not advance	
Olga Vasdeki	Triple jump	14.54	13 Q	14.34	11
Kalliopi Ouzouni	Shot put	18.03	13	Did not advance	
Irini Terzoglou	Shot put	17.34	19	Did not advance	
Anastasia Kelesidou	Discus throw	64.13	4 Q	66.68	2nd place, silver medalist(s)
Styliani Tsikouna	Discus throw	61.72	9 q	59.48	11
Ekaterini Voggoli	Discus throw	63.39	6 Q	62.37	7
Stella Papadopoulou	Hammer throw	61.61	40	Did not advance	
Alexandra Papageorgiou	Hammer throw	68.58	11 Q	66.83	12
Evdokia Tsamoglou	Hammer throw	62.76	36	Did not advance	
Savva Lika	Javelin throw	62.22	4 Q	60.91	9
Mirela Manjani	Javelin throw	61.04	11 Q	64.29	3rd place, bronze medalist(s)
Angeliki Tsiolakoudi	Javelin throw	59.64	19	Did not advance	

Combined events – Heptathlon

Athlete	Event	100H	HJ	SP	200 m	LJ	JT	800 m	Final	Rank
Argyro Strataki	Result	13.65	1.79	13.52	24.57	5.97	43.87	2:17.90	6117	15
Argyro Strataki	Points	1028	966	762	927	840	742	852	6117	15

== Badminton ==
As the host nation, the Greek team were entitled to enter only two badminton players regardless of how they fared in the qualifying stages.

Athlete	Event	Round of 32	Round of 16	Quarterfinal	Semifinal	Final / BM	
Athlete	Event	Opposition Score	Opposition Score	Opposition Score	Opposition Score	Opposition Score	Rank
George Patis; Theodoros Velkos	Men's doubles	Chan C M / Chew C E (MAS); L 1–15, 4–15	Did not advance				

== Baseball ==
Roster

Manager: 27 – Jack Rhodes.

Coaches: 1 – Mike Riskas, 14 – Ioannis Kazanas, 42 – Scott Demtral

Pos.	No.	Player	Date of birth (age)	Bats	Throws	Club
C	2	Dimitrios Douros	3 June 1980 (aged 24)			(Greece) Marousi 2004
IF	3	Clay Bellinger	18 November 1968 (aged 35)			(Canada) Ottawa Lynx
C	5	Mike Koutsantonakis	9 February 1979 (aged 25)			(United States) Wichita Wranglers
C	6	George Kottaras	10 May 1983 (aged 21)			(United States) Fort Wayne Wizards
OF	7	Cory Harris	7 December 1979 (aged 24)			(United States) Delmarva Shorebirds
IF	8	Erik Pappas	25 April 1966 (aged 38)			(United States) Oklahoma City 89ers
IF	10	Chris Demetral	8 December 1969 (aged 34)			(United States) Oklahoma City 89ers (rtd)
P	13	Meleti Ross Melehes	7 January 1977 (aged 27)			(Canada) London Werewolves (rtd)
IF	15	Peter Maestrales	4 July 1979 (aged 25)			(United States) Newark Bears
P	17	Sean Spencer	29 May 1975 (aged 29)			(United States) Bowie Baysox
OF	18	Bobby Kingsbury	30 August 1980 (aged 23)			(United States) Hickory Crawdads
OF	21	Nick Markakis	17 November 1983 (aged 20)			(United States) Delmarva Shorebirds
OF	23	Peter Rasmusen	30 October 1980 (aged 23)			
P	24	Jared Theodorakos	15 March 1981 (aged 23)			(United States) Helena Brewers
IF	26	Nicholas Theodorou	7 June 1975 (aged 29)			(United States) Las Vegas 51s
OF	29	Jim Kavourias	4 October 1979 (aged 24)			(United States) Jupiter Hammerheads
IF	31	Vasili Spanos	25 February 1981 (aged 23)			(United States) Kane County Cougars
P	33	Laurence Heisler	13 February 1969 (aged 35)			(United States) Spartanburg Phillies
P	34	Christoforos Robinson	18 August 1972 (aged 31)			(Greece) Spartakos Glyfadas
P	37	Alex Cremidan	15 January 1981 (aged 23)			(United States) South Bend Silver Hawks
P	39	Peter Soteropoulos	19 June 1972 (aged 32)			(United States) Peoria Chiefs
P	41	Pete Sykaras	5 May 1979 (aged 25)			(United States) El Paso Diablos
	47	Clint Zavaras	4 January 1967 (aged 37)			(Canada) Calgary Cannons (rtd)

Round robin

Qualified for the final round

Team	W	L	PCT	Tiebreaker (Head–to–head record)
Japan	6	1	.857	1–0
Cuba	6	1	.857	0–1
Canada	5	2	.714	
Australia	4	3	.571	
Chinese Taipei	3	4	.429	
Netherlands	2	5	.286	
Greece	1	6	.143	1–0
Italy	1	6	.143	0–1

Team	1	2	3	4	5	6	7	8	9	R	H	E
Netherlands	0	0	0	6	0	0	0	0	5	11	13	1
Greece	0	0	0	0	0	0	0	0	0	0	2	2
WP: Calvin Maduro (1-0) LP: Clint Zavaras (0-1); Home runs: NED: Y. de Caster in 4th, 3 RBIs; R. Balentien in 9th, 2 RBIs; GRE: None

Team	1	2	3	4	5	6	7	8	9	R	H	E
Greece	0	0	0	1	0	0	0	0	3	4	3	1
Cuba	1	1	0	0	0	1	2	0	x	5	10	1
WP: Norge Luis Vera (1-0) LP: Jared Theodorakos (0-1) Sv: Pedro Luis Lazo (1S); Home runs: GRE: None; CUB: F. Cepeda in 2nd, 1 RBI; M. Enriquez in 6th, 1 RBI; A. Pestano in 7th, 2 RBIs

Team	1	2	3	4	5	6	7	8	9	R	H	E
Greece	0	0	0	0	0	0	1	0	0	1	3	1
Chinese Taipei	0	0	1	1	0	0	5	0	x	7	9	0
WP: Pan Wei-lun (1-0) LP: Peter Soteropoulos (0-1); Home runs: GRE: C. A. Harris in 7th, 1 RBI; TPE: Chen C. Y. in 3rd, 1 RBI

Team	1	2	3	4	5	6	7	8	9	R	H	E
Canada	1	0	0	0	0	0	1	0	0	2	5	0
Greece	0	0	0	0	0	0	0	0	0	0	4	3
WP: Paul Spoljaric (1-0) LP: Meleti Ross Melehes (0-1) Sv: Aaron Myette

Team	1	2	3	4	5	6	7	8	9	R	H	E
Greece	3	1	0	0	0	1	0	1	0	6	14	0
Australia	0	0	3	0	0	2	5	1	x	11	10	0
WP: Ryan Rowland-Smith (2-0) LP: Sean Spencer (0-1); Home runs: GRE: P. Maestrales in 2nd, 1 RBI; J. Kavourias in 8th, 1 RBI; AUS: B. Roneberg in 3rd; P. Gonzalez in 3rd, 2 RBIs; G. Roneberg in 6th, 1 RBI; 1 RBI; B. Kingman in 7th, 3 RBIs

Team	1	2	3	4	5	6	7	8	9	R	H	E
Greece	0	0	0	2	2	2	4	0	2	12	14	3
Italy	0	1	4	0	1	1	0	0	0	7	14	1
WP: Panagiotis Sikaras (1-0) LP: W. E. Lucena (0-1); Home runs: GRE: C. Bellinger in 6th, 1 RBI; N. Markakis in 7th, 3 RBIs; C. A. Harris in 9th, 1 RBI; ITA: J. Ramos Gizzi in 2nd, 1 RBI

Team	1	2	3	4	5	6	7	8	9	R	H	E
Japan	0	1	0	0	0	1	4	0	0	6	13	0
Greece	0	0	0	0	0	0	1	0	0	1	4	1
WP: Naoyuki Shimizu (1-0) LP: Meleti Ross Melehes (0-2); Home runs: JPN: K. Fukudome in 7th, 2 RBIs; Y. Takahashi in 7th, 2 RBIs; GRE: E. D. Pappas in 7th, 1 RBI

== Basketball ==
=== Men's tournament ===
Roster

The following is the Greece roster in the men's basketball tournament of the 2004 Summer Olympics.

Greece men's national basketball team – 2004 Summer Olympics roster
Players
Coaches

Pos.	No.	Name	Age – Date of birth	Height	Club	Ctr.
F	4	Fragiskos Alvertis (C)	30 – 11 June 1974	2.06 m (6 ft 9 in)	Panathinaikos	(Greece)
G	5	Theodoros Papaloukas	27 – 8 May 1977	2.00 m (6 ft 7 in)	CSKA Moscow	(Russia)
G	6	Nikolaos Zisis	20 – 16 August 1983	1.97 m (6 ft 6 in)	AEK Athens	(Greece)
F	7	Dimitris Papanikolaou	27 – 7 February 1977	2.02 m (6 ft 8 in)	Panathinaikos	(Greece)
G	8	Vassilis Spanoulis	22 – 7 August 1982	1.93 m (6 ft 4 in)	Maroussi	(Greece)
F	9	Antonis Fotsis	23 – 1 April 1981	2.09 m (6 ft 10 in)	Real Madrid	(Spain)
G	10	Nikolaos Chatzivrettas	27 – 26 May 1977	1.95 m (6 ft 5 in)	Panathinaikos	(Greece)
F/C	11	Dimosthenis Dikoudis	27 – 24 June 1977	2.08 m (6 ft 10 in)	CSKA Moscow	(Russia)
C	12	Konstantinos Tsartsaris	24 – 17 October 1979	2.09 m (6 ft 10 in)	Panathinaikos	(Greece)
G	13	Dimitris Diamantidis	24 – 6 May 1980	1.96 m (6 ft 5 in)	Iraklis Thessaloniki	(Greece)
C	14	Lazaros Papadopoulos	24 – 3 June 1980	2.13 m (7 ft 0 in)	Dynamo Moscow	(Russia)
F/C	15	Michail Kakiouzis	27 – 29 November 1976	2.07 m (6 ft 9 in)	Dynamo Moscow	(Russia)

Head coach

- (Greece) Panagiotis Giannakis

Assistant coach(es)

- (Greece) Eleftherios Kakiousis
- (Greece) Ioannis Sfairopoulos

Legend

- (C) Team captain
- nat field describes country
  of last club
  before the tournament
- Age as of August 13, 2004

Group play

Pos	Team	Pld	W	L	PF	PA	PD	Pts	Qualification
1	Lithuania	5	5	0	468	414	+54	10	Quarterfinals
2	Greece	5	3	2	389	343	+46	8 (Note: Head-to-head record: Greece 1–1 (1.10 GAvg), Puerto Rico 1–1 (0.99), United States 1–1 (0.92))	Quarterfinals
3	Puerto Rico	5	3	2	410	411	−1	8	Quarterfinals
4	United States	5	3	2	418	389	+29	8	Quarterfinals
5	Australia	5	1	4	383	411	−28	6	9th place playoff
6	Angola	5	0	5	321	421	−100	5	11th place playoff

Source: FIBA archive
Rules for classification: 1) points; 2) head-to-head points; 3) head-to-head goal average; 4) head-to-head number of points scored.
Notes:

15 August 2004
22:15

Greece	76–54	Australia
Scoring by quarter: 23–18, 12–15, 24–18, 17–3
Pts: Papadopoulos 21; Rebs: Papadopoulos 9 Asts: Papaloukas 4		Pts: Heal, Maher 12 each Rebs: Nielsen 6 Asts: Andersen, Heal 1 each

Helliniko Indoor Arena, Athens
Attendance: 11,500
Referees: Pablo Estevez (ARG), José Ronfini (MEX)

17 August 2004
22:15

United States	77–71	Greece
Scoring by quarter: 18–17, 19–14, 20–22, 20–18
Pts: Iverson 17; Rebs: Duncan 9 Asts: Marbury 6		Pts: Fotsis 22; Rebs: Papadopoulos 7 Asts: Papaloukas 6

Helliniko Indoor Arena, Athens
Attendance: 12,000
Referees:
Reynaldo Sanchez (Dominican Republic)
Vicente Bulto (Spain)

19 August 2004
22:15

Greece	76–98	Lithuania
Scoring by quarter: 10–28, 15–26, 19–22, 32–22
Pts: Zisis 18; Rebs: Papanikolaou 7 Asts: Papaloukas 3		Pts: Šiškauskas 25; Rebs: Javtokas, Songaila 5 each Asts: Jasikevičius 8

Helliniko Indoor Arena, Athens
Attendance: 12,000
Referees:
Renato Santos (Brazil)
Pablo Estevez (Argentina)

21 August 2004
22:15

Angola	56–88	Greece
Scoring by quarter: 15–23, 10–20, 10–24, 21–21
Pts: Costa 12; Rebs: Costa 5 Asts: 5 players, 1 each		Pts: Dikoudis 15; Rebs: Dikoudis, Papadopoulos 8 each Asts: Diamantidis 3

Helliniko Indoor Arena, Athens
Attendance: 12,000
Referees: Mike Homsy (CAN), Alejandro Chiti (ARG)

23 August 2004
22:15

Greece	78–58	Puerto Rico
Scoring by quarter: 20–22, 20–6, 16–18, 22–12
Pts: Kakiouzis 16; Rebs: Dikoudis 8 Asts: Papaloukas 4		Pts: Ayuso 11; Rebs: Fajardo 9 Asts: Arroyo 4

Helliniko Indoor Arena, Athens
Attendance: 12,000
Referees:
José Ronfini (Mexico)
Scott Buttler (Australia)

Quarterfinals

26 August 2004
22:15

Greece	64–69	Argentina
Scoring by quarter: 14–22, 21–7, 18–24, 11–16
Pts: Hatzivrettas 12; Rebs: Dikoudis, Papadopoulos 9 each Asts: Diamantidis 3		Pts: Ginóbili, Oberto 13 each Rebs: Herrmann 6 Asts: Ginóbili, Montecchia 2 each

Olympic Indoor Hall, Athens
Attendance: 14,500
Referees: Renato Santos (BRA), Giampaolo Cicoria (ITA)

Classification match (5th–6th place)

28 August 2004
11:15

5th place

Puerto Rico	75–85	Greece
Scoring by quarter: 15–25, 21–19, 20–22, 19–19
Pts: Ayuso 14; Rebs: Santiago 9 Asts: Arroyo 4		Pts: Kakiouzis 20; Rebs: Diamantidis 8 Asts: 3 players, 3 each

Olympic Indoor Hall, Athens
Attendance: 14,500
Referees:
Mike Homsy (Canada)
Michael Aylen (Australia)

=== Women's tournament ===
Roster

The following is the Greece roster in the women's basketball tournament of the 2004 Summer Olympics.

Greece women's national basketball team – 2004 Summer Olympics roster
Players
Coaches

Pos.	No.	Name	Age – Date of birth	Height	Club	Ctr.
G	4	Tatiana Kavvadia	27 – 23 September 1976	1.80 m (5 ft 11 in)	Megas Alexandros	(Greece)
G	5	Anastasia Kostaki	26 – 26 March 1978	1.72 m (5 ft 8 in)	Meverin Parma	(Italy)
G	6	Aikaterini Deli	29 – 12 January 1975	1.66 m (5 ft 5 in)	Dasal	(Greece)
G	7	Dimitra Kalentzou	26 – 3 January 1978	1.74 m (5 ft 9 in)	Sporting Athens	(Greece)
G	8	Atalanti Maria Tasouli	27 – 28 September 1976	1.78 m (5 ft 10 in)	Sporting Athens	(Greece)
F	9	Evanthia Maltsi	25 – 30 December 1978	1.80 m (5 ft 11 in)	Panathinaikos	(Greece)
C	10	Polymnia Saregkou	32 – 11 May 1972	1.85 m (6 ft 1 in)	San Sebastián	(Spain)
F	11	Eleni Vasileiou	30 – 29 July 1974	1.84 m (6 ft 0 in)	Dasal	(Greece)
C	12	Eirini Stachtiari	27 – 27 July 1977	1.92 m (6 ft 4 in)	Glyfada Esperides	(Greece)
C	13	Maria Samoroukova	32 – 19 December 1971	1.91 m (6 ft 3 in)	Dynamo Moscow	(Russia)
F	14	Athina Christoforaki	23 – 6 November 1980	1.83 m (6 ft 0 in)	Panserraikos	(Greece)
F/C	15	Sofia Kligkopoulou (C)	34 – 6 January 1970	1.90 m (6 ft 3 in)	Dasal	(Greece)

Head coach

- (Greece) Georgios Tsitskaris

Assistant coach(es)

- (Greece) Panagiotis Vafeiadis
- (Greece) Dimitris Bakogeorgos

Legend

- (C) Team captain
- nat field describes country
  of last club
  before the tournament
- Age as of August 13, 2004

Group play

Pos	Team	Pld	W	L	PF	PA	PD	Pts	Qualification
1	Australia	5	5	0	418	313	+105	10	Quarterfinals
2	Russia	5	4	1	389	333	+56	9	Quarterfinals
3	Brazil	5	3	2	430	361	+69	8	Quarterfinals
4	Greece (H)	5	2	3	353	392	−39	7	Quarterfinals
5	Japan	5	1	4	381	485	−104	6	
6	Nigeria	5	0	5	335	422	−87	5	

Source: FIBA archive
Rules for classification: 1) points; 2) head-to-head points; 3) head-to-head goal average; 4) head-to-head number of points scored.
(H) Hosts

14 August 2004
20:00

Greece	62–69	Russia
Scoring by quarter: 16–12, 18–19, 9–25, 19–13
Pts: Kostaki 17; Rebs: Kligkopoulou, Samoroukova 7 Asts: Kostaki 5		Pts: Baranova 16; Rebs: Baranova 12; Asts: Arkhipova, Rakhmatulina 2

Olympic Indoor Hall, Athens
Attendance: 1,488
Referees:
Sean Corbin (United States)
Alejandro Chiti (Argentina)

16 August 2004
20:00

Brazil	87–75	Greece
Scoring by quarter: 27–19, 23–24, 14–21, 23–11
Pts: Luz 18; Rebs: Oliveira 11; Asts: Three players 2		Pts: Maltsi 26; Rebs: Maltsi 10; Asts: Kostaki 7

Helliniko Indoor Arena, Athens
Attendance: 2,200
Referees:
Jorge Vazquez (Puerto Rico)
Philippe Leemann (Switzerland)

18 August 2004
16:45

Greece	83–68	Nigeria
Scoring by quarter: 30–15, 15–14, 20–15, 18–24
Pts: Kostaki 25; Rebs: Maltsi, Saregkou 8 Asts: Kostaki 4		Pts: Udoka 28; Rebs: Udoka 18; Asts: Amachree, Iyorhe 1

Helliniko Indoor Arena, Athens
Attendance: 2,300
Referees:
Scott Butler (Australia)
Nancy Ethier (Canada)

20 August 2004
20:00

Australia	77–40	Greece
Scoring by quarter: 18–13, 21–8, 20–9, 18–10
Pts: Jackson 20; Rebs: Jackson 12; Asts: Batkovic 2		Pts: Maltsi 9 Rebs: Maltsi 10; Asts: Saregkou 3

Helliniko Indoor Arena, Athens
Attendance: 4,000
Referees:
Virginijus Dovidavicius (Lithuania)
Giampaolo Cicoria (Italy)

22 August 2004
16:45

Greece	93–91	Japan
Scoring by quarter: 27–15, 20–26, 16–22, 30–28
Pts: Maltsi 33; Rebs: Maltsi 11; Asts: Kalentzou 3		Pts: Yano 28; Rebs: Kusuda 5 Asts: Kusuda

Helliniko Indoor Arena, Athens
Attendance: 7,223
Referees:
Chantal Julien (France)
Michael Aylen (Australia)

Quarterfinals

25 August 2004
14:30

United States	102–72	Greece
Scoring by quarter: 27–19, 28–15, 21–19, 26–19
Pts: Johnson 21; Rebs: Griffith 11; Asts: Thompson 5		Pts: Kostaki 26; Rebs: Samoroukova 6 Asts: Kostaki 8

Olympic Indoor Hall, Athens
Attendance: 8,100
Referees:
Zoran Sutulovic (Serbia and Montenegro)
Dallas Pickering (New Zealand)

7th Place Final

27 August 2004
9:00

7th place

Greece	87–83	New Zealand
Scoring by quarter: 21–24, 22–26, 23–16, 21–17
Pts: Maltsi 29; Rebs: Maltsi, Samoroukova 11; Asts: Kostaki 7		Pts: Loffhagen 23; Rebs: Loffhagen 15; Asts: Loffhagen 3

Olympic Indoor Hall, Athens
Attendance: 6,560
Referees:
José Reyes Ronfini (Mexico)
Shoko Suguro (Japan)

== Boxing ==
Greece was guaranteed five male boxers at the Games by virtue of being the host nation, but the special 'host' places for men's boxing therefore became void, as the Greeks claimed places through the World Championships and the AIBA European Qualification Tournament.

Athlete	Event	Round of 32	Round of 16	Quarterfinals	Semifinals	Final	
Athlete	Event	Opposition Result	Opposition Result	Opposition Result	Opposition Result	Opposition Result	Rank
Marios Kaperonis	Lightweight	Khan (GBR); L RSC	Did not advance				
Spyridon Ioannidis	Light welterweight	Boonjumnong (THA); L 16–28	Did not advance				
Theodoros Kotakos	Welterweight	Aragón (CUB); L RSC	Did not advance				
Georgios Gazis	Middleweight	Taghiyev (AZE); L 31–32	Did not advance				
Elias Pavlidis	Light heavyweight	Mabika (GAB); W 32–17	Ismailov (AZE); W 31–16	El Shamy (EGY); L RSC	Did not advance		
Spyridon Kladouchas	Heavyweight	—N/a	Alakbarov (AZE); L 14–18	Did not advance			

== Canoeing ==
=== Slalom ===
Athlete	Event	Preliminary						Semifinal		Final			
Athlete	Event	Run 1	Rank	Run 2	Rank	Total	Rank	Time	Rank	Time	Rank	Total	Rank
Christos Tsakmakis	Men's C-1	108.22	13	117.32	15	225.54	15	Did not advance					
Alexandros Dimitriou	Men's K-1	122.87	24	113.34	25	236.21	24	Did not advance					
Maria Ferekidi	Women's K-1	124.85	17	125.43	18	250.28	17	Did not advance					

=== Sprint ===
Athlete	Event	Heats		Semifinals		Final	
Athlete	Event	Time	Rank	Time	Rank	Time	Rank
Andreas Kilingaridis	Men's C-1 500 m	1:53.662	5 q	1:53.793	7	Did not advance	
Andreas Kilingaridis	Men's C-1 1000 m	3:53.723	3 q	3:55.608	4	Did not advance	
Apostolos Papandreou	Men's K-1 500 m	1:44.217	5 q	1:46.627	8	Did not advance	
Apostolos Papandreou	Men's K-1 1000 m	3:41.664	8	Did not advance			
Athina-Theodora Alexopoulou	Women's K-1 500 m	1:54.828	3 q	1:54.950	5	Did not advance	

Qualification Legend: Q = Qualify to final; q = Qualify to semifinal

== Cycling ==
=== Track ===
Sprint

Athlete	Event	Qualification		Round 1	Final	
Athlete	Event	Time Speed (km/h)	Rank	Opposition Time Speed (km/h)	Opposition Time Speed (km/h)	Rank
Georgios Cheimonetos; Dimitrios Georgalis; Lampros Vasilopoulos	Men's team sprint	44.986; 60.018	8 Q	France; L 45.708; 59.070	Did not advance	8

Time trial

Athlete	Event	Time	Rank
Dimitrios Georgalis	Men's time trial	1:04.204	15

Keirin

Athlete	Event	1st round	Repechage	2nd round	Final
Athlete	Event	Rank	Rank	Rank	Rank
Lampros Vasilopoulos	Men's keirin	2 Q	Bye	REL	9

Omnium

Athlete	Event	Points	Laps	Rank
Kyriaki Konstantinidou	Women's points race	−18	−2	16

=== Mountain biking ===
Athlete	Event	Time	Rank
Emmanouil Kotoulas	Men's cross-country	LAP (3 laps)	45

== Diving ==
As the host nation, the Greeks were automatically entitled to places in all four synchronized diving events, but for individual events, they had to qualify through their own performances through the 2003 FINA World Championships in Barcelona, Spain, and through the 2004 FINA Diving World Cup series.

Men

Athlete	Event	Preliminaries		Semifinals		Final	
Athlete	Event	Points	Rank	Points	Rank	Points	Rank
Nikolaos Siranidis	3 m springboard	363.75	28	Did not advance			
Ioannis Gavriilidis	10 m platform	395.34	22	Did not advance			
Sotirios Trakas	10 m platform	361.56	26	Did not advance			
Thomas Bimis; Nikolaos Siranidis	3 m synchronized springboard	—N/a				353.34	1st place, gold medalist(s)
Ioannis Gavriilidis; Sotirios Trakas	10 m synchronized platform	—N/a				331.44	7

Women

Athlete	Event	Preliminaries		Semifinals		Final	
Athlete	Event	Points	Rank	Points	Rank	Points	Rank
Diamantina Georgatou	3 m springboard	157.56	33	Did not advance			
Sotiria Koutsopetrou	3 m springboard	250.59	22	Did not advance			
Eftihia Pappa	10 m platform	307.65	15 Q	463.89	17	Did not advance	
Diamantina Georgatou; Sotiria Koutsopetrou	3 m synchronized springboard	—N/a				270.33	8
Eftihia Pappa; Florentia Sfakianou	10 m synchronized platform	—N/a				272.40	8

== Equestrian ==
Greece automatically received a team and the maximum number of individual competitors in show jumping, and at least a single spot each in dressage and eventing.

=== Dressage ===
Athlete	Horse	Event	Grand Prix		Grand Prix Special		Grand Prix Freestyle		Overall	
Athlete	Horse	Event	Score	Rank	Score	Rank	Score	Rank	Score	Rank
Gerta Lehmann	Louis	Individual	60.000	51	Did not advance					
Alexandra Sourla	Gregory	Individual	62.833	47	Did not advance					

=== Eventing ===
Athlete	Horse	Event	Dressage		Cross-country			Jumping						Total	
Athlete	Horse	Event	Dressage		Cross-country			Qualifier			Final			Total	
Athlete	Horse	Event	Penalties	Rank	Penalties	Total	Rank	Penalties	Total	Rank	Penalties	Total	Rank	Penalties	Rank
Heidi Antikatzides	Mikaelmas	Individual	45.20	=16	86.60	131.80	63	17.00	148.80	60	Did not advance			148.80	60

=== Show jumping ===
Athlete	Horse	Event	Qualification								Final					Total	
Athlete	Horse	Event	Round 1		Round 2			Round 3			Round A		Round B			Total	
Athlete	Horse	Event	Penalties	Rank	Penalties	Total	Rank	Penalties	Total	Rank	Penalties	Rank	Penalties	Total	Rank	Penalties	Rank
Emmanouela Athanassiades	Rimini Z	Individual	Eliminated		Did not advance												
Hannah Mytilinaiou	Santana 329	Individual	13	=63	26	39	63 Q	26	65	60	Did not advance						
Antonis Petris	Gredo la Daviere	Individual	0	=1	4	4	=5 Q	8	12	=13 Q	16	=36	Did not advance				
Danae Tsatsou	Roble Z	Individual	5	=31	39	44	65	Withdrew			Did not advance						
Emmanouela Athanassiades; Hannah Mytilinaiou; Antonis Petris; Danae Tsatsou	See above	Team	—N/a								47	14	Did not advance				

== Fencing ==
As the host nation, Greece received ten quota places which can be allocated to any of the fencing events. Additional places can be won in specific disciplines in a series of qualification events.

Men

Athlete	Event	Round of 64	Round of 32	Round of 16	Quarterfinal	Semifinal	Final / BM	
Athlete	Event	Opposition Score	Opposition Score	Opposition Score	Opposition Score	Opposition Score	Opposition Score	Rank
Georges Ambalof	Individual épée	Nabil (EGY); L 6–15	Did not advance					
Marios Basmatzian	Individual sabre	Nagara (JPN); L 8–15	Did not advance					
Jason Dourakos	Individual sabre	Zhou Hm (CHN); L 10–15	Did not advance					
Constantine Manetas	Individual sabre	Bernaoui (ALG); W 15–10	Montano (ITA); L 12–15	Did not advance				
Marios Basmatzian; Jason Dourakos; Dimitrios Kostakos; Constantine Manetas	Team sabre	—N/a			Russia; L 22–45	Classification semi-final Ukraine; L 39–45	7th place final China; L 42–45	8

Women

Athlete	Event	Round of 64	Round of 32	Round of 16	Quarterfinal	Semifinal	Final / BM	
Athlete	Event	Opposition Score	Opposition Score	Opposition Score	Opposition Score	Opposition Score	Opposition Score	Rank
Jeanne Hristou	Individual épée	Bye	MacKay (CAN); W 15–13	Logounova (RUS); W 15–10	Flessel-Colovic (FRA); L 13–15	Did not advance		
Dimitra Magkandaki	Individual épée	Beer (NZL); W 15–8	Nisima (FRA); L 5–6	Did not advance				
Niki Sidiropoulou	Individual épée	Ndong (SEN); W WO	Bokel (GER); L 10–15	Did not advance				
Jeanne Hristou; Dimitra Magkandaki; Niki Sidiropoulou	Team épée	—N/a		South Africa; W 34–15	Germany; L 32–33	Classification semi-final China; L 18-29	7th place final South Korea; L 30-44	8
Maria Rentoumi	Individual foil	—N/a	Yusheva (RUS); L 4–15	Did not advance				

== Football ==
=== Men's tournament ===
Roster

The following is the Greek squad in the men's football tournament of the 2004 Summer Olympics.

Head coach: Stratos Apostolakis

No.	Pos.	Player	Date of birth (age)	Caps	Goals	2004 club
1	GK	Georgios Ambaris	23 April 1982 (aged 22)	2	0	(Hellenic Football Federation) Iraklis
2	DF	Aris Galanopoulos	13 September 1981 (aged 22)	1	0	(Hellenic Football Federation) Kalamata
3	MF	Panagiotis Lagos	18 July 1985 (aged 19)	3	0	(Hellenic Football Federation) Iraklis
4	DF	Evangelos Moras	26 August 1981 (aged 22)	3	0	(Hellenic Football Federation) AEK Athens
5	DF	Spyros Vallas	26 August 1981 (aged 22)	3	0	(Hellenic Football Federation) Olympiacos
6	MF	Ieroklis Stoltidis*	2 February 1975 (aged 29)	3	1	(Hellenic Football Federation) Olympiacos
7	FW	Anestis Agritis	16 April 1981 (aged 23)	1	0	(Hellenic Football Federation) Egaleo
8	MF	Konstantinos Nebegleras*	14 April 1975 (aged 29)	3	0	(Hellenic Football Federation) Iraklis
9	FW	Dimitris Salpingidis	18 August 1981 (aged 22)	3	0	(Hellenic Football Federation) PAOK
10	FW	Nikolaos Mitrou	10 July 1983 (aged 21)	2	0	(Hellenic Football Federation) Panionios
11	FW	Dimitrios Papadopoulos	20 October 1981 (aged 22)	3	1	(Hellenic Football Federation) Panathinaikos
12	DF	Christos Karypidis	2 December 1982 (aged 21)	0	0	(Hellenic Football Federation) PAOK
13	MF	Fanouris Goundoulakis	13 July 1981 (aged 23)	0	0	(Hellenic Football Federation) Panionios
14	MF	Georgios Fotakis	29 October 1981 (aged 22)	1	0	(Hellenic Football Federation) Egaleo
15	MF	Miltiadis Sapanis*	28 January 1976 (aged 28)	3	0	(Hellenic Football Federation) Panathinaikos
16	DF	Loukas Vyntra	5 February 1981 (aged 23)	3	0	(Hellenic Football Federation) Panathinaikos
17	MF	Giannis Taralidis	17 May 1981 (aged 23)	3	2	(Hellenic Football Federation) Olympiacos
18	GK	Kleopas Giannou	4 May 1982 (aged 22)	1	0	(Hellenic Football Federation) Olympiacos

* Over-aged player.

Group play

Pos	Team	Pld	W	D	L	GF	GA	GD	Pts	Qualification
1	Mali	3	1	2	0	5	3	+2	5	Qualified for the quarterfinals
2	South Korea	3	1	2	0	6	5	+1	5	Qualified for the quarterfinals
3	Mexico	3	1	1	1	3	3	0	4	
4	Greece	3	0	1	2	4	7	−3	1	

11 August 2004
20:30

South Korea	2 – 2	Greece
D. J. Kim 43'; Vyntra 64' (o.g.)	Report	Taralidis 78'; Papadopoulos 82' (pen.)

Kaftanzoglio Stadium, Thessaloniki
Attendance: 25,152
Referee: Jorge Larrionda (Uruguay)

14 August 2004
20:30

Greece	0 – 2	Mali
	Report	Berthe 2'; N'Diaye 45'

Kaftanzoglio Stadium, Thessaloniki
Attendance: 17,123
Referee: Carlos Torres (Paraguay)

17 August 2004
20:30

Greece	2 – 3	Mexico
Taralidis 82' (pen.); Stoltidis 90+3'	Report	Márquez 47'; Bravo 70', 86'

Panthessaliko Stadium, Volos
Attendance: 21,597
Referee: Divine Evehe (Cameroon)

=== Women's tournament ===
Roster

Head coach: Xanthi Konstantinidou

Greece named a squad of 18 players and 4 alternates for the tournament.

No.	Pos.	Player	Date of birth (age)	Caps	Goals	Club
1	GK	Maria Yatrakis	10 June 1980 (aged 24)	29	0	(United States Soccer Federation) Connecticut Huskies
2	MF	Angeliki Lagoumtzi	23 November 1982 (aged 21)	56	3	(Hellenic Football Federation) Kavala 86
3	MF	Sophia Smith	18 November 1978 (aged 25)	31	0	(United States Soccer Federation) Houston Stars
4	DF	Catherine Stratakis	12 September 1978 (aged 25)	32	0	(Hellenic Football Federation) Ergotelis
5	DF	Athanasia Pouridou	22 January 1975 (aged 29)	63	0	(Hellenic Football Federation) Kavala 86
6	MF	Eftichia Michailidou (captain)	20 September 1977 (aged 26)	80	6	(Hellenic Football Federation) Kavala 86
7	FW	Vasiliki Soupiadou	6 April 1978 (aged 26)	54	5	(Hellenic Football Federation) Aegina
8	DF	Konstantina Katsaiti	17 May 1980 (aged 24)	59	8	(Hellenic Football Federation) Aegina
9	FW	Angeliki Tefani	8 June 1982 (aged 22)	52	9	(Hellenic Football Federation) Ifestos Peristeriou
10	MF	Natalia Chatzigiannidou	19 June 1979 (aged 25)	77	8	(Hellenic Football Federation) MEAO Filiriakos
11	FW	Dimitra Panteliadou	15 February 1986 (aged 18)	39	13	(Hellenic Football Federation) PAOK
12	MF	Walker Loseno	12 January 1982 (aged 22)	23	3	(United States Soccer Federation) Gonzaga Bulldogs
13	DF	Alexandra Kavadas	31 August 1983 (aged 20)	12	0	(United States Soccer Federation) Greater Boston
14	FW	Anastasia Papadopoulou	1 July 1986 (aged 18)	34	4	(Hellenic Football Federation) Kavala 86
15	MF	Tanya Kalivas	26 August 1979 (aged 24)	34	3	(United States Soccer Federation) California Storm
16	DF	Eleni Benson	12 January 1983 (aged 21)	25	0	(United States Soccer Federation) Yale Bulldogs
17	MF	Maria Lazarou	30 September 1972 (aged 31)	110	26	(Hellenic Football Federation) PAOK
18	GK	Ileana Moschos	14 November 1976 (aged 27)	17	0	(United States Soccer Federation) California Storm

Group play

Pos	Team	Pld	W	D	L	GF	GA	GD	Pts	Qualification
1	United States	3	2	1	0	6	1	+5	7	Qualified for the quarterfinals
2	Brazil	3	2	0	1	8	2	+6	6	Qualified for the quarterfinals
3	Australia	3	1	1	1	2	2	0	4	Qualified for the quarterfinals
4	Greece	3	0	0	3	0	11	−11	0	

August 11, 2004
18:00

Greece	0 – 3	United States
	Report	Boxx 14'; Wambach 30'; Hamm 82'

Pankritio Stadium, Heraklio
Attendance: 15.757
Referee: Palqvist (Sweden)

August 14, 2004
20:30

Greece	0 – 1	Australia
	Report	Garriock 27'

Pankritio Stadium, Heraklio
Attendance: 8.857
Referee: D'Coth (India)

August 17, 2004
20:30

Greece	0 – 7	Brazil
	Report	Pretinha 21'; Cristiane 46', 55', 77'; Grazielle 49'; Marta 70'; Daniela 72'

Pampeloponnisiako Stadium, Patras
Attendance: 7.214
Referee: Frai (Germany)

== Gymnastics ==
=== Artistic ===
Men

Athlete	Event	Qualification								Final							
Athlete	Event	Apparatus						Total	Rank	Apparatus						Total	Rank
Athlete	Event	F	PH	R	V	PB	HB	Total	Rank	F	PH	R	V	PB	HB	Total	Rank
Vlasios Maras	All-around	8.950	8.650	8.775	9.512	9.087	9.725	54.699	36	Did not advance							
Dimosthenis Tampakos	Rings	—N/a		9.850	—N/a			9.850	1 Q	—N/a		9.862	—N/a			9.862	1st place, gold medalist(s)

Women

Athlete	Event	Qualification						Final					
Athlete	Event	Apparatus				Total	Rank	Apparatus				Total	Rank
Athlete	Event	V	UB	BB	F	Total	Rank	V	UB	BB	F	Total	Rank
Maria Apostolidi	All-around	9.075	7.712	8.450	8.675	33.912	57	Did not advance					
Stefani Bismpikou	All-around	9.100	9.387	9.337	8.662	36.486	24 Q	8.887	9.475	8.900	9.237	36.499	15

=== Rhythmic ===
Athlete	Event	Qualification						Final					
Athlete	Event	Hoop	Ball	Clubs	Ribbon	Total	Rank	Hoop	Ball	Clubs	Ribbon	Total	Rank
Eleni Andriola	Individual	24.850	25.350	24.500	24.900	99.600	6 Q	24.475	24.800	23.500	24.825	97.600	9
Theodora Pallidou	Individual	24.150	24.475	23.200	23.400	95.225	11	Did not advance					

Athlete	Event	Qualification				Final			
Athlete	Event	5 ribbons	3 hoops 2 balls	Total	Rank	5 ribbons	3 hoops 2 balls	Total	Rank
Ilektra Efthymiou; Maria Kakiou; Liana Khristidou; Eleni Khronopoulou; Varvara Magnisali; Steriani Pantazi	Team	22.700	23.700	46.400	3 Q	22.600	23.925	46.525	5

=== Trampoline ===
Athlete	Event	Qualification		Final	
Athlete	Event	Score	Rank	Score	Rank
Michail Pelivanidis	Men's	62.60	12	Did not advance	

== Handball ==
=== Men's tournament ===
Roster

The following is the Greece roster in the men's handball tournament of the 2004 Summer Olympics.

Head coaches: Ulf Hakan Schefvert

No.	Pos.	Name	Date of birth (age)	Height	App.	Goals	Club
2	LW	Vangelis-Giorgos Voglis	17 December 1977 (aged 26)	1.80 m			(Sweden) Djurgårdens IF
4	RW	Dimitrios Tzimourtos	10 February 1981 (aged 23)	1.72 m			(Greece) Filippos AC Veria
6	RB	Alexandros Vasilakis	8 August 1979 (aged 25)	1.98 m			(Germany) Wilhelmshavener HV
7	LW	Giorgos Zaravinas	13 June 1976 (aged 28)	1.82 m			(Greece) Panellinios
8	LW	Gregor Chatsatourian	19 April 1977 (aged 27)	1.75 m			(Greece) AC Doukas
9	LB	Spyros Balomenos	28 February 1979 (aged 25)	1.95 m			(Sweden) IF Guif Stockholm
10	P	Nikolaos Kokolodimitrakis	7 April 1981 (aged 23)	2.00 m			(Greece) Ionikos
11	CB	Nikolaos Grammatikos	13 October 1969 (aged 34)	1.90 m			(Greece) Panellinios
12	GK	Dimitrios Kafatos	20 March 1976 (aged 28)	1.94 m			(Greece) Ionikos
13	CB	Sasa Zivoulovic	14 April 1972 (aged 32)	1.87 m			(Greece) AC Doukas
14	LB	Andreas Troupis	5 April 1973 (aged 31)	1.95 m			(Greece) Panellinios
16	GK	Jiotsa Chrysopoulos	29 July 1969 (aged 35)	1.91 m			(Spain) Barakaldo UPV Bilbao
17	P	Giorgos Chalkidis	13 May 1977 (aged 27)	1.96 m			(Greece) Panellinios
19	RB	Alexis Alvanos	9 April 1980 (aged 24)	1.97 m			(Greece) Panellinios
20	RW	Savvas Karypidis	23 May 1979 (aged 25)	1.83 m			(Greece) Filippos AC Veria

Group play

Pos	Team	Pld	W	D	L	GF	GA	GD	Pts	Qualification
1	France	5	5	0	0	135	108	+27	10	Quarterfinals
2	Hungary	5	4	0	1	132	124	+8	8	Quarterfinals
3	Germany	5	3	0	2	139	110	+29	6	Quarterfinals
4	Greece (H)	5	2	0	3	117	130	−13	4	Quarterfinals
5	Brazil	5	1	0	4	105	133	−28	2	
6	Egypt	5	0	0	5	110	133	−23	0	

Rules for classification: 1) Points; 2) Head-to-head points; 3) Head-to-head goal difference; 4) Head-to-head goals scored; 5) Goal difference; 6) Goals scored; 7) Draw.
(H) Hosts

14 August 2004; 16:30	Germany	28 – 18	Greece	Sports Pavilion, Athens; Referees: Breto, Huelin Trillo (ESP)
14 August 2004; 16:30	Schwarzer, Kehrmann 6	(15-8)	Grammatikos 5	Sports Pavilion, Athens; Referees: Breto, Huelin Trillo (ESP)
14 August 2004; 16:30	2× (yellow card) 5× (suspension)		3× (yellow card) 3× (suspension)	Sports Pavilion, Athens; Referees: Breto, Huelin Trillo (ESP)

16 August 2004; 16:30	Greece	25 – 29	France	Sports Pavilion, Athens; Referees: Boye, Jensen (DEN)
16 August 2004; 16:30	Karypidis 7	(15-15)	Anquetil 9	Sports Pavilion, Athens; Referees: Boye, Jensen (DEN)
16 August 2004; 16:30	4× (yellow card) 9× (suspension)		3× (yellow card) 4× (suspension)	Sports Pavilion, Athens; Referees: Boye, Jensen (DEN)

18 August 2004; 16:30	Greece	26 – 25	Egypt	Sports Pavilion, Athens; Referees: Oie, Togstad (NOR)
18 August 2004; 16:30	Karypidis 10	(18-10)	Keshk 7	Sports Pavilion, Athens; Referees: Oie, Togstad (NOR)
18 August 2004; 16:30	3× (yellow card) 8× (suspension)		3× (yellow card) 4× (suspension) 2× (red card)	Sports Pavilion, Athens; Referees: Oie, Togstad (NOR)

20 August 2004; 14:30	Brazil	22 – 26	Greece	Sports Pavilion, Athens; Referees: Arnaldsson, Vidarsson (ISL)
20 August 2004; 14:30	Justino 6	(9-13)	Grammatikos 7	Sports Pavilion, Athens; Referees: Arnaldsson, Vidarsson (ISL)
20 August 2004; 14:30	3× (yellow card) 4× (suspension)		3× (yellow card) 3× (suspension)	Sports Pavilion, Athens; Referees: Arnaldsson, Vidarsson (ISL)

22 August 2004; 14:30	Hungary	26 – 22	Greece	Sports Pavilion, Athens; Referees: Pozeznik, Repensek (SLO)
22 August 2004; 14:30	Pérez 7	(12-12)	Voglis 7	Sports Pavilion, Athens; Referees: Pozeznik, Repensek (SLO)
22 August 2004; 14:30	3× (yellow card) 1× (suspension)		2× (yellow card) 1× (suspension)	Sports Pavilion, Athens; Referees: Pozeznik, Repensek (SLO)

Quarterfinal

24 August 2004; 16:30	Croatia	33 – 27	Greece	Sports Pavilion, Athens; Referees: Lemme, Ullrich (GER)
24 August 2004; 16:30	Džomba 11	(19-11)	Balomenos, Alvanos 6	Sports Pavilion, Athens; Referees: Lemme, Ullrich (GER)
24 August 2004; 16:30	3× (yellow card)		4× (yellow card) 2× (suspension)	Sports Pavilion, Athens; Referees: Lemme, Ullrich (GER)

5th-8th Place Semifinal

27 August 2004; 11:30	Greece	29 – 24	South Korea	Sports Pavilion, Athens; Referees: Nachevski, Nachevski (MKD)
27 August 2004; 11:30	Balomenos 8	(16-9)	Yoon 6	Sports Pavilion, Athens; Referees: Nachevski, Nachevski (MKD)
27 August 2004; 11:30	3× (yellow card) 6× (suspension) 1× (red card)		3× (yellow card) 1× (suspension)	Sports Pavilion, Athens; Referees: Nachevski, Nachevski (MKD)

Fifth Place Final

28 August 2004; 19:30	Greece	15 – 33	France	Helliniko Olympic Indoor Arena, Athens; Referees: Lemme, Ullrich (GER)
28 August 2004; 19:30	Grammatikos 7	(7-17)	Fernandez 9	Helliniko Olympic Indoor Arena, Athens; Referees: Lemme, Ullrich (GER)
28 August 2004; 19:30	3× (yellow card) 6× (suspension)		2× (yellow card) 3× (suspension)	Helliniko Olympic Indoor Arena, Athens; Referees: Lemme, Ullrich (GER)

=== Women's tournament ===
Roster

The following is the Greece roster in the women's handball tournament of the 2004 Summer Olympics.

Head coaches: Svein Andre Olsen

No.	Pos.	Name	Date of birth (age)	Height	App.	Goals	Club
2	P	Anna Psatha	8 February 1975 (aged 29)	1.72 m			(Germany) VfL Oldenburg
3	P	Eleni Poimenidou	4 July 1980 (aged 24)	1.72 m			(Greece) Ormi Patras
5	LW	Eleni Potari	25 August 1982 (aged 21)	1.71 m			(Greece) Aris Nikeas
7	LB	Georgia Dorotheou	20 October 1980 (aged 23)	1.65 m			(Greece) Aris Nikeas
8	RW	Panagoula Vemi	26 May 1971 (aged 33)	1.67 m			(Greece) Anagennisi Arta
9	LB	Ioanna Fotiadou	22 November 1977 (aged 26)	1.78 m			(Greece) Anagennisi Arta
10	CB	Vasiliki Skara	4 May 1973 (aged 31)	1.80 m			(Greece) Anagennisi Arta
11	LB	Grigoria Gkolia	22 March 1974 (aged 30)	1.84 m			(Germany) VfL Oldenburg
12	GK	Elena Nikoli	12 May 1982 (aged 22)	1.77 m			(Greece) Ormi Patras
15	LB	Tatiana Sousa	16 February 1975 (aged 29)	1.81 m			(Greece) OFN Ionias
16	GK	Eleftheria Mavrogeni	12 May 1970 (aged 34)	1.77 m			(Greece) Makedonikos
17	RW	Anastasia Patsiou	13 June 1977 (aged 27)	1.72 m			(Germany) TUS Weibern
18	RB	Michaela Michalopoulou	20 April 1980 (aged 24)	1.87 m			(Greece) Aris Nikeas
19	CB	Styliani Gioupi	6 February 1978 (aged 26)	1.77 m			(Greece) OFN Ionias
20	LW	Vicky Theodoridou	27 January 1982 (aged 22)	1.65 m			(Switzerland) LC Bruni

Group play

Pos	Team	Pld	W	D	L	GF	GA	GD	Pts	Qualification
1	Ukraine	4	4	0	0	99	82	+17	8	Quarterfinals
2	Hungary	4	3	0	1	118	93	+25	6	Quarterfinals
3	China	4	2	0	2	106	90	+16	4	Quarterfinals
4	Brazil	4	1	0	3	97	105	−8	2	Quarterfinals
5	Greece (H)	4	0	0	4	74	124	−50	0	

Rules for classification: 1) Points; 2) Head-to-head points; 3) Head-to-head goal difference; 4) Head-to-head goals scored; 5) Goal difference; 6) Goals scored; 7) Draw.
(H) Hosts

15 August 2004; 16:30	Greece	21 – 29	Brazil	Sports Pavilion, Athens; Referees: Baum, Goralczyk (POL)
15 August 2004; 16:30	Gioupi 6	(8-14)	Piedade 7	Sports Pavilion, Athens; Referees: Baum, Goralczyk (POL)
15 August 2004; 16:30	3× (yellow card) 7× (suspension)		3× (yellow card) 5× (suspension)	Sports Pavilion, Athens; Referees: Baum, Goralczyk (POL)

17 August 2004; 16:30	Hungary	33 – 20	Greece	Sports Pavilion, Athens; Referees: Gardinovacki, Maric (SCG)
17 August 2004; 16:30	Kirsner, Siti 6	(15-9)	Gioupi 8	Sports Pavilion, Athens; Referees: Gardinovacki, Maric (SCG)
17 August 2004; 16:30	3× (yellow card) 4× (suspension)		3× (yellow card) 8× (suspension) 1× (red card)	Sports Pavilion, Athens; Referees: Gardinovacki, Maric (SCG)

19 August 2004; 16:30	Greece	13 – 33	China	Sports Pavilion, Athens; Referees: Bord, Buy (FRA)
19 August 2004; 16:30	Gioupi, Psatha, Sousa 3	(6 – 15)	Zhai 7	Sports Pavilion, Athens; Referees: Bord, Buy (FRA)
19 August 2004; 16:30	3× (yellow card) 7× (suspension)		2× (yellow card) 4× (suspension)	Sports Pavilion, Athens; Referees: Bord, Buy (FRA)

21 August 2004; 16:30	Ukraine	29 – 20	Greece	Sports Pavilion, Athens; Referees: Gardinovacki, Maric (SCG)
21 August 2004; 16:30	Lyapina 7	(15-10)	Gkolia 10	Sports Pavilion, Athens; Referees: Gardinovacki, Maric (SCG)
21 August 2004; 16:30	3× (yellow card) 4× (suspension)		2× (yellow card) 3× (suspension)	Sports Pavilion, Athens; Referees: Gardinovacki, Maric (SCG)

9th-10th Place Final

26 August 2004; 12:30	Greece	23 -38	Angola	Helliniko Arena, Athens; Referees: Boye, Jensen (DEN)
26 August 2004; 12:30	Potari 6	(11-18)	Bengue 8	Helliniko Arena, Athens; Referees: Boye, Jensen (DEN)
26 August 2004; 12:30	3× (yellow card) 3× (suspension)		3× (yellow card) 2× (suspension)	Helliniko Arena, Athens; Referees: Boye, Jensen (DEN)

== Judo ==
Greek judoka receive one place in each of the 14 categories by virtue of hosting the Olympic tournament – the maximum allocation possible.

Men

Athlete	Event	Round of 32	Round of 16	Quarterfinals	Semifinals	Repechage 1	Repechage 2	Repechage 3	Final / BM	
Athlete	Event	Opposition Result	Opposition Result	Opposition Result	Opposition Result	Opposition Result	Opposition Result	Opposition Result	Opposition Result	Rank
Revazi Zintiridis	−60 kg	Zokirov (UZB); W 1011–0000	Fallon (GBR); W 1010–0110	Akhondzadeh (IRI); L 0021–1000	Did not advance	Bye	Cameroun (CMR); W 1000–0000	Uematsu (ESP); L 0100–1000	Did not advance	
Giorgi Vazagashvili	−66 kg	Dashdavaa (MGL); L 0010–0100	Did not advance							
Lavrentios Alexanidis	−73 kg	Makarov (RUS); L 0000–1000	Did not advance			Kevkhishvili (GEO); L 0001–1001	Did not advance			
Ilias Iliadis	−81 kg	Endicott- Davies (AUS); W 1002–0000	Sganga (ARG); W WO	Kwon Y-M (KOR); W 0001–0000	Nossov (RUS); W 1010–0000	Bye			Hontyuk (UKR); W 1110–0000	1st place, gold medalist(s)
Dionysios Iliadis	−90 kg	Pereteyko (UZB); W 1000–0000	Izumi (JPN); L 0010–1010	Did not advance		Kukharenka (BLR); L 0000–1021	Did not advance			
Vassilios Iliadis	−100 kg	Jurack (GER); L 0000–1000	Did not advance			Despaigne (CUB); L 0010–1000	Did not advance			
Charalampos Papaioannou	+100 kg	Ruíz (VEN); W 1010–0000	Suzuki (JPN); L 0001–1101	Did not advance		Tölzer (GER); L 0000–0200	Did not advance			

Women

Athlete	Event	Round of 32	Round of 16	Quarterfinals	Semifinals	Repechage 1	Repechage 2	Repechage 3	Final / BM	
Athlete	Event	Opposition Result	Opposition Result	Opposition Result	Opposition Result	Opposition Result	Opposition Result	Opposition Result	Opposition Result	Rank
Maria Karagiannopoulou	−48 kg	Bye	Tani (JPN); L 0001–0220	Did not advance		Bye	Haddad (ALG); W 0101–0100	Żemła-Krajewska (POL); W 1001–0000	Matijass (GER); L 0000–1000	5
Maria Tselaridou	−52 kg	Bye	Imbriani (GER); L 0000–1002	Did not advance						
Ioulieta Boukouvala	−57 kg	Bye	Cox (GBR); L 0000–0001	Did not advance						
Eleni Tampasi	−63 kg	Bye	Vandecaveye (BEL); L 0000–1000	Did not advance						
Alexia Kourtelesi	−70 kg	Bye	Copes (ARG); L 0000–1021	Did not advance						
Varvara Akritidou	−78 kg	Bye	Matrosova (UKR); L 0000–1100	Did not advance		Lee S-Y (KOR); L 0000–1000	Did not advance			
Eleni Patsiou	+78 kg	Bye	Bisséni (FRA); L 0000–1000	Did not advance						

== Modern pentathlon ==
As the host nation, Greece received one automatic qualification place per gender through the European and UIPM World Championships.

Athlete	Event	Shooting (10 m air pistol)			Fencing (épée one touch)			Swimming (200 m freestyle)			Riding (show jumping)			Running (3000 m)			Total points	Final rank
Athlete	Event	Points	Rank	MP Points	Results	Rank	MP points	Time	Rank	MP points	Penalties	Rank	MP points	Time	Rank	MP Points	Total points	Final rank
Vasileios Floros	Men's	174	20	1024	10–21	=31	664	2:04.40	7	1308	100	11	1100	11:02.25	31	752	4848	28
Katalin-Beat Partits	Women's	176	12	1048	17–14	=7	860	2:23.32	16	1252	168	23	1032	11:49.11	27	884	5028	16

== Rowing ==
Greece received only two boats in both men's and women's lightweight double sculls at the 2003 World Rowing Championships.

Men

Athlete	Event	Heats		Repechage		Semifinals		Final	
Athlete	Event	Time	Rank	Time	Rank	Time	Rank	Time	Rank
Vasileios Polymeros; Nikolaos Skiathitis	Lightweight double sculls	6:15.22	1 SA/B	Bye		6:17.12	2 FA	6:23.23	3rd place, bronze medalist(s)

Women

Athlete	Event	Heats		Repechage		Semifinals		Final	
Athlete	Event	Time	Rank	Time	Rank	Time	Rank	Time	Rank
Chrysi Biskitzi; Maria Sakellaridou	Lightweight double sculls	7:05.52	4 R	7:04.98	3 SA/B	7:15.45	6 FB	7:48.42	12

Qualification Legend: FA=Final A (medal); FB=Final B (non-medal); FC=Final C (non-medal); FD=Final D (non-medal); FE=Final E (non-medal); FF=Final F (non-medal); SA/B=Semifinals A/B; SC/D=Semifinals C/D; SE/F=Semifinals E/F; R=Repechage

== Sailing ==
As the host nation, Greece received automatic qualification places in each boat class.

Men

Athlete	Event	Race											Net points	Final rank
Athlete	Event	1	2	3	4	5	6	7	8	9	10	M*	Net points	Final rank
Nikolaos Kaklamanakis	Mistral	1	4	4	~~14~~	6	13	2	3	5	4	10	52	2nd place, silver medalist(s)
Aimilios Papathanasiou	Finn	1	5	17	13	15	6	RDG	2	1	~~22~~	4	72.4	5
Andreas Kosmatopoulos; Konstantinos Trigkonis	470	9	6	11	9	16	2	23	15	21	20	~~OCS~~	132	18
Georgios Kontogouris; Leonidas Pelekanakis	Star	16	2	10	~~17~~	5	14	10	1	9	16	3	86	11

Women

Athlete	Event	Race											Net points	Final rank
Athlete	Event	1	2	3	4	5	6	7	8	9	10	M*	Net points	Final rank
Athina Frai	Mistral	6	18	4	16	11	17	9	16	18	~~OCS~~	8	123	15
Virginia Kravarioti	Europe	15	~~21~~	5	14	2	12	15	9	16	3	3	94	9
Sofia Bekatorou; Emilia Tsoulfa	470	1	2	2	13	1	1	14	1	1	2	~~DNS~~	38	1st place, gold medalist(s)
Eleni Dimitrakopoulou; Aikaterini Giakomidou; Efychia Mantzaraki	Yngling	12	6	8	4	6	6	16	RDG	8	9	~~OCS~~	86	11

Open

Athlete	Event	Race																Net points	Final rank
Athlete	Event	1	2	3	4	5	6	7	8	9	10	11	12	13	14	15	M*	Net points	Final rank
Evangelos Cheimonas	Laser	12	24	36	15	7	17	20	2	6	16	—N/a					~~37~~	155	16
Athanasios Pachoumas; Vasileios Portosalte	49er	15	12	8	14	15	13	14	18	8	17	~~DSQ~~	12	RDG	15	7	~~OCS~~	181.4	17
Christos Garefis; Iordanis Paschalidis	Tornado	12	10	2	9	10	7	~~16~~	13	15	14	—N/a					3	95	12

M = Medal race; OCS = On course side of the starting line; DSQ = Disqualified; DNF = Did not finish; DNS= Did not start; RDG = Redress given

== Shooting ==
As the host nation, Greece was awarded a minimum of eleven quota places in ten different events.

Men

Athlete	Event	Qualification		Final	
Athlete	Event	Points	Rank	Points	Rank
Nikolaos Antoniadis	Trap	110	31	Did not advance	
Dionissios Georgakopoulos	10 m air pistol	572	=33	Did not advance	
Dionissios Georgakopoulos	50 m pistol	549	=28	Did not advance	
Evangelos Liogris	50 m rifle prone	589	=36	Did not advance	
Evangelos Liogris	50 m rifle 3 positions	1135	=38	Did not advance	
Georgios Petsanis	10 m air rifle	593	=12	Did not advance	
Georgios Salavantakis	Skeet	119	=21	Did not advance	
Konstantinos Savorgiannakis	10 m air rifle	592	=18	Did not advance	
Angelos Spiropoulos	Double trap	124	=22	Did not advance	

Women

Athlete	Event	Qualification		Final	
Athlete	Event	Points	Rank	Points	Rank
Maria Faka	10 m air rifle	388	=33	Did not advance	
Marina Karaflou	10 m air pistol	377	=26	Did not advance	
Agathi Kassoumi	25 m pistol	574	=21	Did not advance	
Alexia Smirli	10 m air rifle	391	=27	Did not advance	

== Softball ==
Team Roster

Greece
Position	No.	Player	Birth	Club in 2004
OF	1	Lindsey Bashor	MAY/26/1983	University of Iowa
C	5	Stacey Farnworth	NOV/11/1979	American Pastime (California, USA)
IF	7	Katina Kramos	JUL/12/1972	
P	8	Stephanie Skegas-Maxwell	AUG/30/1968	Southern California Sliders (California, USA)
IF	9	Jamie Farnworth	JAN/14/1982	
IF	12	Chloe Kloezeman	MAY/29/1986	Sorceres (California, USA)
IF	13	Ginny Georgantas	NOV/28/1979	Whiteford Sharks (Illinois, USA)
P	15	Sarah Farnworth	JAN/07/1979	
P	16	Kristen Karanzias	FEB/08/1984	Orange County Batbusters (California, USA)
IF	19	Joanna Gail	APR/11/1986	San Diego Thunder Under 18 Gold (California, USA)
IF	21	Vanessa Czarnecki	DEC/21/1979	Fresno State Bulldogs (California, USA)
OF	25	Lindsay James	APR/26/1980	California Gold Bears (California, USA)
OF	26	Ioanna Bouziou	MAY/14/1973	Tason, Keratsini
OF	31	Jessica Bashor	APR/08/1981	
OF	32	Katerina Koutoungou	JUL/21/1976	Marousi 2004
Bench Coaches
Team; Manager		Linda Wells	DEC/13/1949	
Coach		Christa Dalakis	NOV/17/1975	Marylanders (Maryland, USA)
Coach		Diane Lynn Ninemire	FEB/12/1957	

Preliminary Round

Team	W	L	RS	RA	WIN%	Tiebreaker
United States	7	0	41	0	1.000	-
Australia	6	1	22	14	.857	-
Japan	4	3	17	8	.571	-
China	3	4	15	20	.429	1–0
Canada	3	4	6	14	.429	0–1
Chinese Taipei	2	5	3	13	.286	1–0
Greece	2	5	6	24	.286	0–1
Italy	1	6	8	24	.143	-

August 14 19:30 at Helliniko Softball Stadium
Team	1	2	3	4	5	6	7	R	H	E
Greece	0	0	0	0	0	0	0	0	2	6
China	0	1	1	0	3	0	X	5	5	1
WP: Lü Wei(1–0) LP: Sarah Farnworth(0–1)

August 15 19:30 at Helliniko Softball Stadium
Team	1	2	3	4	5	6	7	R	H	E
Canada	0	0	0	0	0	0	0	0	3	4
Greece	0	1	0	0	1	0	X	2	3	0
WP: Sarah Farnworth(1–1) LP: Kaila Holtz(0–1)

August 16 17:00 at Helliniko Softball Stadium
Team	1	2	3	4	5	6	7	R	H	E
Italy	0	0	0	0	1	0	0	1	6	0
Greece	2	0	0	0	0	0	X	2	5	3
WP: Sarah Farnworth(2–1) LP: Susan Bugliarello(0–1)

August 17 17:00 at Helliniko Softball Stadium
Team	1	2	3	4	5	6	7	R	H	E
Chinese Taipei	0	0	0	0	0	0	2	2	3	1
Greece	0	0	0	0	0	0	0	0	5	1
WP: Lai Sheng-Jung(1–0) LP: Sarah Farnworth(2–2)

August 18 19:30 at Helliniko Softball Stadium
Team	1	2	3	4	5	6	7	R	H	E
Japan	0	3	1	0	0	0	2	6	12	1
Greece	0	0	0	0	0	0	0	0	2	3
WP: Hiroko Sakai(2–0) LP: Sarah Farnworth(2–3)

August 19 12:00 at Helliniko Softball Stadium
Team	1	2	3	4	5	R	H	E
Greece	0	0	0	0	0	0	1	1
United States	0	0	1	3	3	7	9	0
WP: Lisa Fernandez(2–0) LP: Stephanie Skegas-Maxwell(0–1); Notes: Game ended by Run Ahead Rule

August 20 17:00 at Helliniko Softball Stadium
Team	1	2	3	4	5	6	7	R	H	E
Greece	2	0	0	0	0	0	0	2	4	2
Australia	0	0	1	2	0	0	X	3	7	1
WP: Tanya Harding(3–0) LP: Sarah Farnworth(2–4); Home runs: GRE: None; AUS: Tracey Mosley, Stacey Porter

== Swimming ==
Greek swimmers earned qualifying standards in the following events (up to a maximum of 2 swimmers in each event at the A-standard time, and 1 at the B-standard time):

Men

Athlete	Event	Heat		Semifinal		Final	
Athlete	Event	Time	Rank	Time	Rank	Time	Rank
Romanos Alyfantis	200 m breaststroke	2:18.18	33	Did not advance			
Georgios Diamantidis	1500 m freestyle	16:06.31	31	—N/a		Did not advance	
Ioannis Drymonakos	200 m butterfly	1:59.42	22	Did not advance			
Ioannis Drymonakos	400 m individual medley	4:16.83	9	—N/a		Did not advance	
Spyridon Gianniotis	400 m freestyle	3:48.77	7 Q	—N/a		3:48.77	7
Spyridon Gianniotis	1500 m freestyle	15:03.87	5 Q	—N/a		15:03.69	5
Antonios Gkioulmpas	200 m backstroke	2:04.30	28	Did not advance			
Aristeidis Grigoriadis	100 m freestyle	50.61	32	Did not advance			
Aristeidis Grigoriadis	100 m backstroke	55.85	17	Did not advance			
Ioannis Kokkodis	200 m individual medley	2:02.11	16 Q	2:01.57	12	Did not advance	
Ioannis Kokkodis	400 m individual medley	4:16.56	5 Q	—N/a		4:18.60	6
Dimitrios Manganas	400 m freestyle	3:54.78	24	—N/a		Did not advance	
Christos Papadopoulos	100 m breaststroke	1:04.43	39	Did not advance			
Sotirios Pastras	100 m butterfly	54.20	31	Did not advance			
Apostolos Tsagkarakis	50 m freestyle	22.72	24	Did not advance			
Andreas Zisimos	200 m freestyle	1:49.60	15 Q	1:49.76	12	Did not advance	
Spyridon Bitsakis; Aristeidis Grigoriadis; Alexandros Tsoltos; Andreas Zisimos	4 × 100 m freestyle relay	3:24.26	14	—N/a		Did not advance	
Apostolos Antonopoulos; Dimitrios Manganas; Nikolaos Xylouris; Andreas Zisimos	4 × 200 m freestyle relay	7:19.71	4 Q	—N/a		7:23.02	8

Women

Athlete	Event	Heat		Semifinal		Final	
Athlete	Event	Time	Rank	Time	Rank	Time	Rank
Vasiliki Angelopoulou	200 m butterfly	2:13.88	22	Did not advance			
Vasiliki Angelopoulou	400 m individual medley	4:44.90	7 Q	—N/a		4:50.85	8
Zoi Dimoschaki	200 m freestyle	2:03.38	27	Did not advance			
Zoi Dimoschaki	400 m freestyle	4:13.96	20	—N/a		Did not advance	
Eirini Karastergiou	100 m backstroke	1:05.30	33	Did not advance			
Eirini Karastergiou	200 m backstroke	2:21.93	30	Did not advance			
Eirini Kavarnou	100 m butterfly	1:00.43	19	Did not advance			
Marianna Lymperta	800 m freestyle	8:42.65	19	—N/a		Did not advance	
Martha Matsa	50 m freestyle	26.46	33	Did not advance			
Nery Mantey Niangkouara	50 m freestyle	25.62	13 Q	25.27	10	Did not advance	
Nery Mantey Niangkouara	100 m freestyle	55.12	6 Q	55.02	7 Q	54.81	6
Aikaterini Sarakatsani	100 m breaststroke	1:12.46	29	Did not advance			
Athina Tzavella	200 m breaststroke	2:40.18	31	Did not advance			
Athina Tzavella	200 m individual medley	2:20.30	23	Did not advance			
Zoi Dimoschaki; Eleni Kosti; Martha Matsa; Nery Mantey Niangkouara	4 × 100 m freestyle relay	DSQ		—N/a		Did not advance	
Zoi Dimoschaki; Marianna Lymperta; Georgia Manoli; Evangelia Tsagka	4 × 200 m freestyle relay	8:16.69	15	—N/a		Did not advance	

== Synchronized swimming ==
As the host nation, Greece had a squad of 9 synchronised swimmers taking part in both the duet and team events.

Athlete	Event	Technical routine		Free routine (preliminary)			Free routine (final)		
Athlete	Event	Points	Rank	Points	Total (technical + free)	Rank	Points	Total (technical + free)	Rank
Eleftheria Ftouli; Christina Thalassinidou	Duet	46.334	9	46.584	92.918	9 Q	46.584	92.918	9
Aglaia Anastasiou; Maria Christodoulou; Eleftheria Ftouli; Eleni Georgiou; Effrosyni Gouda; Apostolia Ioannou; Evgenia Koutsoudi; Olga Pelekanou	Team	46.250	8	—N/a			46.500	92.750	8

== Table tennis ==
Greece fielded a four-strong table tennis team at the 2004 Olympic Games after being granted permission to use host nation qualification places.

Athlete	Event	Round 1	Round 2	Round 3	Round 4	Quarterfinals	Semifinals	Final / BM	
Athlete	Event	Opposition Result	Opposition Result	Opposition Result	Opposition Result	Opposition Result	Opposition Result	Opposition Result	Rank
Panagiotis Gionis	Men's singles	He Zw (ESP); L 1–4	Did not advance						
Kalinikos Kreanga	Men's singles	Bye		Persson (SWE); L 0–4	Did not advance				
Panagiotis Gionis; Kalinikos Kreanga	Men's doubles	—N/a	Gonzales / Tabachnik (ARG); W 4–1	Kito / Tasaki (JPN); L 3–4	Did not advance				
Archontoula Volakaki	Women's singles	Kravchenko (ISR); L 0–4	Did not advance						
Maria Mirou; Archontoula Volakaki	Women's doubles	Bye	Stefanova / Tan Wl (ITA); L 1–4	Did not advance					

== Taekwondo ==
Greece had not taken any formal part in qualification tournaments in taekwondo, as the Greeks already had four guaranteed places at their disposal, two for men, two for women.

Athlete	Event	Round of 16	Quarterfinals	Semifinals	Repechage 1	Repechage 2	Final / BM	
Athlete	Event	Opposition Result	Opposition Result	Opposition Result	Opposition Result	Opposition Result	Opposition Result	Rank
Michail Mouroutsos	Men's −58 kg	Sutthikunkarn (THA); W 5–2	Bayoumi (EGY); L 2–8	Did not advance				
Alexandros Nikolaidis	Men's +80 kg	Rojas (VEN); W 7–3	Zrouri (MAR); W 5–2	Kamal (JOR); W 6–3	Bye		Moon D-S (KOR); L KO	2nd place, silver medalist(s)
Areti Athanasopoulou	Women's −57 kg	Sukkhongdumnoen (THA); L 6–6 SUP	Did not advance					
Elisavet Mystakidou	Women's −67 kg	Wihongi (NZL); W 4–0	Juárez (GUA); W 6–4	Rivero (PHI); W 3–2	Bye		Luo W (CHN); L 6–7	2nd place, silver medalist(s)

== Tennis ==
As the host nation, Greece nominated two male and two female tennis players to compete in the tournament through their world rankings.

Athlete	Event	Round of 64	Round of 32	Round of 16	Quarterfinals	Semifinals	Final / BM	
Athlete	Event	Opposition Score	Opposition Score	Opposition Score	Opposition Score	Opposition Score	Opposition Score	Rank
Konstantinos Economidis	Men's singles	González (CHI); L 6–7^{(2–7)}, 2–6	Did not advance					
Konstantinos Economidis; Vasilis Mazarakis	Men's doubles	—N/a	Damm / Suk (CZE); L 1–6, 3–6	Did not advance				
Eleni Daniilidou	Women's singles	Castaño (COL); W 6–2, 6–1	Maleeva (BUL); W 2–6, 6–4, 6–4	Myskina (RUS); L 5–7, 4–6	Did not advance			
Eleni Daniilidou; Christina Zachariadou	Women's doubles	—N/a	Mauresmo / Pierce (FRA); L 5–7, 1–6	Did not advance				

== Triathlon ==
Greece offered a single guaranteed place in the men's triathlon.

Athlete	Event	Swim (1.5 km)	Trans 1	Bike (40 km)	Trans 2	Run (10 km)	Total Time	Rank
Vassilis Krommidas	Men's	18:20	0:18	Did not finish				

== Volleyball ==
As the host nation, Greece gained automatic entry for men's and women's teams in both indoor and beach volleyball.

=== Beach ===
Athlete	Event	Preliminary round	Standing	Round of 16	Quarterfinals	Semifinals	Final	
Athlete	Event	Opposition Score	Standing	Opposition Score	Opposition Score	Opposition Score	Opposition Score	Rank
Pavlos Beligratis; Athanasios Michalopoulos	Men's	Pool F Pocock – Rorich (RSA); L 1 – 2 (16–21, 26–24, 10–15); Brenha – Maia (POR); L 0 – 2 (14–21, 19–21); Baracetti – Conde (ARG); L WO	4	Did not advance				
Vassiliki Arvaniti; Efthalia Koutroumanidou	Women's	Pool C Lahme – Müsch (GER); L 1 – 2 (16–21, 21–16, 10–15); Connelly – Pires (BRA); L 0 – 2 (13–21, 14–21); Håkedal – Tørlen (NOR); W 2 – 1 (21–11, 21–23, 15–12)	3 Q	Pohl – Rau (GER); L 1 – 2 (12–21, 21–19, 11–15)	Did not advance			
Vasso Karantasiou; Effrosyni Sfyri	Women's	Pool F García – Gaxiola (MEX); W 2 – 0 (21–17, 21–13); Lochowicz – Pottharst (AUS); L 1 – 2 (15–21, 21–15, 14–16); Tian J – Wang F (CHN); W 2 – 0 (21–14, 21–17)	2 Q	Connelly – Pires (BRA); L 0 – 2 (16–21, 19–21)	Did not advance			

=== Indoor ===
==== Men's tournament ====
Roster

The following is the Greek roster in the men's volleyball tournament of the 2004 Summer Olympics.

Head coach: Stelios Prosalikas

№	Name	Date of birth	Height	Weight	Spike	Block	2004 club
1	Konstantinos Christofidelis	26 June 1977	1.96 m (6 ft 5 in)	87 kg (192 lb)	341 cm (134 in)	320 cm (130 in)	(Greece) Olympiacos
2	Marios Giourdas (c)	2 March 1973	2.02 m (6 ft 8 in)	90 kg (200 lb)	356 cm (140 in)	341 cm (134 in)	(Greece) Iraklis
3	Theodoros Chatziantoniou	16 March 1974	2.04 m (6 ft 8 in)	95 kg (209 lb)	360 cm (140 in)	350 cm (140 in)	(Greece) Olympiacos
6	Vasileios Kournetas	2 August 1976	1.92 m (6 ft 4 in)	82 kg (181 lb)	336 cm (132 in)	320 cm (130 in)	(Greece) Olympiacos
7	Georgios Stefanou (L)	12 January 1981	1.87 m (6 ft 2 in)	82 kg (181 lb)	295 cm (116 in)	305 cm (120 in)	(Greece) Panathinaikos
10	Antonios Tsakiropoulos	1 July 1969	2.03 m (6 ft 8 in)	93 kg (205 lb)	350 cm (140 in)	336 cm (132 in)	(Greece) Olympiacos
11	Nikolaos Roumeliotis	12 October 1978	1.98 m (6 ft 6 in)	97 kg (214 lb)	343 cm (135 in)	320 cm (130 in)	(Greece) EA Patras
14	Sotirios Pantaleon	21 June 1980	1.98 m (6 ft 6 in)	77 kg (170 lb)	330 cm (130 in)	312 cm (123 in)	(Greece) Panathinaikos
15	Ilias Lappas	20 July 1979	1.95 m (6 ft 5 in)	92 kg (203 lb)	335 cm (132 in)	320 cm (130 in)	(Greece) Panathinaikos
16	Andrej Kravárik	28 July 1971	2.04 m (6 ft 8 in)	97 kg (214 lb)	360 cm (140 in)	350 cm (140 in)	(Greece) Iraklis
17	Konstantinos Prousalis	6 October 1980	1.92 m (6 ft 4 in)	83 kg (183 lb)	320 cm (130 in)	295 cm (116 in)	(Greece) PAOK
18	Theodoros Baev	31 May 1977	2.00 m (6 ft 7 in)	95 kg (209 lb)	340 cm (130 in)	333 cm (131 in)	(Greece) Iraklis

Group play

Pos	Team	Pld	W	L	Pts	SW	SL	SR	SPW	SPL	SPR	Qualification
1	Serbia and Montenegro	5	4	1	9	12	6	2.000	427	398	1.073	Quarterfinals
2	Greece	5	3	2	8	12	9	1.333	475	454	1.046	Quarterfinals
3	Argentina	5	3	2	8	12	9	1.333	471	457	1.031	Quarterfinals
4	Poland	5	3	2	8	10	9	1.111	422	419	1.007	Quarterfinals
5	France	5	2	3	7	8	10	0.800	405	394	1.028	
6	Tunisia	5	0	5	5	4	15	0.267	373	451	0.827	

Source: FIVB

15 August 2004; 19:30	Tunisia	0–3	Greece	Peace and Friendship Stadium, Athens; Referees: Valdir Dellaqua (BRA), Fernando Nava (MEX)
15 August 2004; 19:30	(20–25, 14–25, 17–25); Report			Peace and Friendship Stadium, Athens; Referees: Valdir Dellaqua (BRA), Fernando Nava (MEX)

17 August 2004; 09:00	Greece	3–1	Poland	Peace and Friendship Stadium, Athens; Attendance: 8 Referees: Luciano Gaspari (ITA), Jarmo Salonen (FIN)
17 August 2004; 09:00	(21–25, 25–18, 25–21, 25–20); Report			Peace and Friendship Stadium, Athens; Attendance: 8 Referees: Luciano Gaspari (ITA), Jarmo Salonen (FIN)

19 August 2004; 19:30	Argentina	3–1	Greece	Peace and Friendship Stadium, Athens; Referees: Mahmoud Abdel Magid (EGY), Patricia Salvatore (USA)
19 August 2004; 19:30	(16–25, 25–21, 25–22, 25–22); Report			Peace and Friendship Stadium, Athens; Referees: Mahmoud Abdel Magid (EGY), Patricia Salvatore (USA)

21 August 2004; 19:30	Greece	3–2	France	Peace and Friendship Stadium, Athens; Referees: Umit Sokullu (Turkey), Frank Leuthaeusser (Germany)
21 August 2004; 19:30	(25–22, 14–25, 26–24, 23–25, 15–10); Report			Peace and Friendship Stadium, Athens; Referees: Umit Sokullu (Turkey), Frank Leuthaeusser (Germany)

23 August 2004; 19:00	Serbia and Montenegro	3–2	Greece	Peace and Friendship Stadium, Athens; Referees: Luciano Gaspari (ITA), Jarmo Salonen (FIN)
23 August 2004; 19:00	(21–25, 38–36, 25–13, 23–25, 15–12); Report			Peace and Friendship Stadium, Athens; Referees: Luciano Gaspari (ITA), Jarmo Salonen (FIN)

Quarterfinal

25 August 2004; 19:30	Greece	2–3	United States	Peace and Friendship Stadium, Athens; Referees: Kim Kun-tae (KOR), Juan Angel Pereyra (ARG)
25 August 2004; 19:30	(20–25, 25–22, 27–25, 23–25, 15–17); Report			Peace and Friendship Stadium, Athens; Referees: Kim Kun-tae (KOR), Juan Angel Pereyra (ARG)

==== Women's tournament ====
Roster

The following is the Greek roster in the women's volleyball tournament of the 2004 Summer Olympics.

Head coach: Dimitrios Floros

No.	Name	Date of birth	Height	Weight	Spike	Block	2004 club
1	Zanna Proniadu	13 December 1978	1.90 m (6 ft 3 in)	82 kg (181 lb)	305 cm (120 in)	300 cm (120 in)	(Greece) Filathlitikos
2	Maria Gkaragkouni (c)	21 December 1975	1.81 m (5 ft 11 in)	79 kg (174 lb)	307 cm (121 in)	290 cm (110 in)	(Greece) Vrilissia
4	Niki Gkaragkouni	12 March 1977	1.85 m (6 ft 1 in)	84 kg (185 lb)	313 cm (123 in)	255 cm (100 in)	(Greece) Panathinaikos
6	Eleni Memetzi	12 January 1975	1.82 m (6 ft 0 in)	70 kg (150 lb)	293 cm (115 in)	287 cm (113 in)	(Greece) Vrilissia
8	Charikleia Sakkoula	18 December 1973	1.80 m (5 ft 11 in)	65 kg (143 lb)	193 cm (76 in)	287 cm (113 in)	(Greece) Panathinaikos
9	Eleftheria Chatzinikou	20 April 1978	1.83 m (6 ft 0 in)	63 kg (139 lb)	288 cm (113 in)	280 cm (110 in)	(Greece) Filathlitikos
10	Ioanna Vlachou (L)	14 May 1981	1.67 m (5 ft 6 in)	63 kg (139 lb)	278 cm (109 in)	270 cm (110 in)	(Greece) Filathlitikos
11	Vasiliki Papazoglou	24 August 1979	1.85 m (6 ft 1 in)	83 kg (183 lb)	299 cm (118 in)	292 cm (115 in)	(Greece) Panellinios
14	Sofia Iordanidou	3 May 1974	1.91 m (6 ft 3 in)	79 kg (174 lb)	304 cm (120 in)	297 cm (117 in)	(Greece) OFA Apollonios
15	Georgia Tzanaki	1 December 1980	1.89 m (6 ft 2 in)	85 kg (187 lb)	278 cm (109 in)	267 cm (105 in)	(Greece) Panellinios
16	Eleni Kiosi	27 February 1985	1.84 m (6 ft 0 in)	69 kg (152 lb)	278 cm (109 in)	267 cm (105 in)	(Greece) Iraklis
18	Rouxantra-Kon Ntoumitreskou	20 April 1977	1.86 m (6 ft 1 in)	71 kg (157 lb)	298 cm (117 in)	287 cm (113 in)	(Greece) Panathinaikos

Group play

Pos	Team	Pld	W	L	Pts	SW	SL	SR	SPW	SPL	SPR	Qualification
1	Brazil	5	5	0	10	15	2	7.500	410	326	1.258	Quarterfinals
2	Italy	5	4	1	9	14	3	4.667	392	305	1.285	Quarterfinals
3	South Korea	5	3	2	8	9	7	1.286	355	352	1.009	Quarterfinals
4	Japan	5	2	3	7	6	10	0.600	346	343	1.009	Quarterfinals
5	Greece	5	1	4	6	5	12	0.417	349	383	0.911	
6	Kenya	5	0	5	5	0	15	0.000	236	379	0.623	

Source: FIVB

14 August 2004; 16:00	Greece	3–0	Kenya	Peace and Friendship Stadium, Athens; Referees: Patricia Salvatore (USA), Ibrahim Al Naama (QAT)
14 August 2004; 16:00	(25–7, 25–22, 25–14)			Peace and Friendship Stadium, Athens; Referees: Patricia Salvatore (USA), Ibrahim Al Naama (QAT)

August 16, 2004; 16:00	Greece	1–3	South Korea	Peace and Friendship Stadium, Athens; Referees: Juan Angel Pereyra (ARG), Francisco Medina Guzmán (CUB)
August 16, 2004; 16:00	(25–20, 19–25, 15–25, 22–25)			Peace and Friendship Stadium, Athens; Referees: Juan Angel Pereyra (ARG), Francisco Medina Guzmán (CUB)

18 August 2004; 16:35	Japan	3–1	Greece	Peace and Friendship Stadium, Athens; Referees: Francisco Medina Guzmán (CUB), Valdir Dellaqua (BRA)
18 August 2004; 16:35	(25–10, 20–25, 25–21, 25–22)			Peace and Friendship Stadium, Athens; Referees: Francisco Medina Guzmán (CUB), Valdir Dellaqua (BRA)

20 August 2004; 16:00	Greece	0–3	Brazil	Peace and Friendship Stadium, Athens; Referees: Abdullah Al Khelaifi (KSA), Fernando Nava (MEX)
20 August 2004; 16:00	(22–25, 22–25, 11–25)			Peace and Friendship Stadium, Athens; Referees: Abdullah Al Khelaifi (KSA), Fernando Nava (MEX)

22 August 2004; 16:00	Italy	3–0	Greece	Peace and Friendship Stadium, Athens; Referees: Jarmo Salonen (FIN), Patrick Rachard (FRA)
22 August 2004; 16:00	(25–19, 25–19, 25–22)			Peace and Friendship Stadium, Athens; Referees: Jarmo Salonen (FIN), Patrick Rachard (FRA)

== Water polo ==
=== Men's tournament ===
Roster

The following is the Greek roster in the men's water polo tournament of the 2004 Summer Olympics.

Head coach: (Italy) Alessandro Campagna

№	Name	Pos.	Height	Weight	Date of birth	2004 club
1	Georgios Reppas	GK	1.89 m (6 ft 2 in)	86 kg (190 lb)	11 December 1974	(Greece) NC Vouliagmeni
2	Anastasios Schizas	CF	1.91 m (6 ft 3 in)	90 kg (200 lb)	18 February 1977	(Greece) Olympiacos
3	Dimitrios Mazis	CF	1.84 m (6 ft 0 in)	85 kg (187 lb)	5 September 1976	(Greece) NC Vouliagmeni
4	Konstantinos Loudis (C)	CF	1.83 m (6 ft 0 in)	85 kg (187 lb)	24 March 1969	(Greece) Panionios
5	Theodoros Chatzitheodorou	CF	1.90 m (6 ft 3 in)	100 kg (220 lb)	1 October 1976	(Greece) Olympiacos
6	Argyris Theodoropoulos	CF	1.88 m (6 ft 2 in)	89 kg (196 lb)	13 January 1981	(Greece) Olympiacos
7	Christos Afroudakis	CF	1.89 m (6 ft 2 in)	87 kg (192 lb)	23 May 1984	(Greece) NC Vouliagmeni
8	Theodoros Kalakonas	D	1.80 m (5 ft 11 in)	88 kg (194 lb)	28 October 1974	(Greece) Olympiacos
9	Georgios Afroudakis	CB	1.94 m (6 ft 4 in)	100 kg (220 lb)	17 October 1976	(Greece) NC Vouliagmeni
10	Stefanos Santa	D	1.86 m (6 ft 1 in)	94 kg (207 lb)	21 May 1975	(Greece) Panionios
11	Antonios Vlontakis	CB	1.88 m (6 ft 2 in)	92 kg (203 lb)	10 October 1975	(Greece) Ethnikos Piraeus
12	Nikolaos Deligiannis	GK	1.90 m (6 ft 3 in)	90 kg (200 lb)	3 September 1976	(Greece) Olympiacos
13	Ioannis Thomakos	CF	1.85 m (6 ft 1 in)	88 kg (194 lb)	14 March 1977	(Greece) Olympiacos

Group play

Pos	Team	Pld	W	D	L	GF	GA	GD	Pts	Qualification
1	Greece	5	4	0	1	43	27	+16	8	Qualified for the semifinals
2	Germany	5	3	1	1	40	28	+12	7	Qualified for the quarterfinals
3	Spain	5	3	0	2	35	31	+4	6	Qualified for the quarterfinals
4	Italy	5	3	0	2	39	24	+15	6	
5	Australia	5	1	1	3	37	35	+2	4	
6	Egypt	5	0	0	5	18	67	−49	0	

15 August 2004; 21:00	Germany	5–4	Greece	Athens Olympic Aquatic Centre; Referees: Brguljan (SCG), Afanasiev (RUS)
15 August 2004; 21:00	Score by quarters: 2-2, 0-1, 2-1, 1-0			Athens Olympic Aquatic Centre; Referees: Brguljan (SCG), Afanasiev (RUS)
15 August 2004; 21:00	5 players with 1	Goals	4 players with 1	Athens Olympic Aquatic Centre; Referees: Brguljan (SCG), Afanasiev (RUS)

17 August 2004; 21:00	Greece	8–5	Spain	Athens Olympic Aquatic Centre; Referees: Kratochvil (SVK), Margeta (SLO)
17 August 2004; 21:00	Score by quarters: 2-1, 4-1, 1-2, 1-1			Athens Olympic Aquatic Centre; Referees: Kratochvil (SVK), Margeta (SLO)
17 August 2004; 21:00	Chatzitheodorou, Schizas 2	Goals	Five players with 1	Athens Olympic Aquatic Centre; Referees: Kratochvil (SVK), Margeta (SLO)

19 August 2004; 21:00	Egypt	4–15	Greece	Athens Olympic Aquatic Centre; Referees: Matache (ROU), Zhong (CHN)
19 August 2004; 21:00	Score by quarters: 0-5, 0-2, 2-3, 2-5			Athens Olympic Aquatic Centre; Referees: Matache (ROU), Zhong (CHN)
19 August 2004; 21:00	4 players with 1	Goals	Thomakos 5	Athens Olympic Aquatic Centre; Referees: Matache (ROU), Zhong (CHN)

21 August 2004; 17:45	Greece	10–9	Australia	Athens Olympic Aquatic Centre; Referees: Balfanbayev (KAZ), Kiszelly (HUN)
21 August 2004; 17:45	Score by quarters: 2-2, 3-2, 3-2, 2-3			Athens Olympic Aquatic Centre; Referees: Balfanbayev (KAZ), Kiszelly (HUN)
21 August 2004; 17:45	Chatzitheodorou 3	Goals	3 players with 2	Athens Olympic Aquatic Centre; Referees: Balfanbayev (KAZ), Kiszelly (HUN)

23 August 2004; 22:15	Greece	6–4	Italy	Athens Olympic Aquatic Centre; Referees: Balfanbayev (KAZ), Bookelman (NED)
23 August 2004; 22:15	Score by quarters: 1-0, 1-2, 2-1, 2-1			Athens Olympic Aquatic Centre; Referees: Balfanbayev (KAZ), Bookelman (NED)
23 August 2004; 22:15	6 players with 1	Goals	Bencivenga 2	Athens Olympic Aquatic Centre; Referees: Balfanbayev (KAZ), Bookelman (NED)

Semifinal

27 August 2004; 21:00	Greece	3–7	Serbia and Montenegro	Olympic Aquatic Centre; Referees: Petronilli (ITA), Tulga (TUR)
27 August 2004; 21:00	Score by quarters: 1-2, 1-3, 1-1, 0-1			Olympic Aquatic Centre; Referees: Petronilli (ITA), Tulga (TUR)
27 August 2004; 21:00	Three players with 1	Goals	Jokić 2	Olympic Aquatic Centre; Referees: Petronilli (ITA), Tulga (TUR)

Bronze Medal Final

29 August 2004; 16:00	Russia	6–5	Greece	Olympic Aquatic Centre; Referees: Borrell (ESP), Brguljan (SCG)
29 August 2004; 16:00	Score by quarters: 1-1, 3–1, 1–2, 1–1			Olympic Aquatic Centre; Referees: Borrell (ESP), Brguljan (SCG)
29 August 2004; 16:00	Tchomakhidze 4	Goals	Afroudakis 3	Olympic Aquatic Centre; Referees: Borrell (ESP), Brguljan (SCG)

=== Women's tournament ===
Roster

The following is the Greek roster in the women's water polo tournament of the 2004 Summer Olympics.

Head coach: Kyriakos Iosifidis

№	Name	Pos.	Height	Weight	Date of birth	2004 club
1	Georgia Ellinaki	GK	1.74 m (5 ft 9 in)	65 kg (143 lb)	28 February 1974	(Greece) ANO Glyfada
2	Dimitra Asilian (C)	D	1.70 m (5 ft 7 in)	60 kg (130 lb)	10 July 1972	(Greece) Olympiacos
3	Aniopi Melidoni	CB	1.71 m (5 ft 7 in)	63 kg (139 lb)	11 October 1977	(Greece) NC Vouliagmeni
4	Angeliki Karapataki	D	1.70 m (5 ft 7 in)	58 kg (128 lb)	19 February 1975	(Greece) ANO Glyfada
5	Kyriaki Liosi	D	1.70 m (5 ft 7 in)	65 kg (143 lb)	30 October 1979	(Greece) ANO Glyfada
6	Stavroula Kozompoli	CF	1.80 m (5 ft 11 in)	70 kg (150 lb)	14 January 1974	(Greece) ANO Glyfada
7	Aikaterini Oikonomopoulou	CB	1.80 m (5 ft 11 in)	60 kg (130 lb)	16 February 1978	(Greece) ANO Glyfada
8	Antigoni Roumpesi	D	1.78 m (5 ft 10 in)	77 kg (170 lb)	19 July 1983	(Greece) NC Vouliagmeni
9	Evangelia Moraitidou	CB	1.84 m (6 ft 0 in)	74 kg (163 lb)	26 March 1975	(Greece) NC Vouliagmeni
10	Eftychia Karagianni	D	1.68 m (5 ft 6 in)	61 kg (134 lb)	10 October 1973	(Greece) ANO Glyfada
11	Georgia Lara	CF	1.75 m (5 ft 9 in)	73 kg (161 lb)	31 May 1980	(Greece) NC Vouliagmeni
12	Antonia Moraiti	D	1.65 m (5 ft 5 in)	54 kg (119 lb)	2 May 1977	(Greece) ANO Glyfada
13	Anthoula Mylonaki	GK	1.78 m (5 ft 10 in)	77 kg (170 lb)	10 June 1984	(Greece) NC Vouliagmeni

Group play

Pos	Team	Pld	W	D	L	GF	GA	GD	Pts	Qualification
1	Australia	3	2	1	0	22	16	+6	5	Qualified for the Semifinals
2	Italy	3	2	0	1	20	14	+6	4	Qualified for the Quarterfinals
3	Greece	3	1	1	1	17	20	−3	3	Qualified for the Quarterfinals
4	Kazakhstan	3	0	0	3	16	25	−9	0	

16 August 2004; 17:45	Report	Greece	8–6	Kazakhstan	Athens Olympic Aquatic Centre; Referees: Radu Matache (ROU); Daniel Legare (CAN)
16 August 2004; 17:45	Report	Score by quarters: 2–2, 2–1, 2–2, 2–1			Athens Olympic Aquatic Centre; Referees: Radu Matache (ROU); Daniel Legare (CAN)
16 August 2004; 17:45	Report	Roumpesi 2 Karagianni 1 Kozompoli 1 Liosi 1 Moraiti 1 Evangelia Moraitidou 1 Oikonomopoulou 1	Goals	Gritsenko 2 Jakayeva 2 Koroleva 1 Tolkunova 1	Athens Olympic Aquatic Centre; Referees: Radu Matache (ROU); Daniel Legare (CAN)

18 August 2004; 17:45	Report	Greece	2–7	Italy	Athens Olympic Aquatic Centre; Referees: Sergio Borrell (ESP); Radosław Koryzna (POL)
18 August 2004; 17:45	Report	Score by quarters: 0–3, 2–2, 0–1, 0–1			Athens Olympic Aquatic Centre; Referees: Sergio Borrell (ESP); Radosław Koryzna (POL)
18 August 2004; 17:45	Report	Liosi 1 Moraitidou 1	Goals	di Mario 3 Miceli 3 Musumeci 1	Athens Olympic Aquatic Centre; Referees: Sergio Borrell (ESP); Radosław Koryzna (POL)

20 August 2004; 18:00	Report	Australia	7–7	Greece	Athens Olympic Aquatic Centre; Referees: Aaron Chaney (USA); Gábor Kiszelly (HUN)
20 August 2004; 18:00	Report	Score by quarters: 1–2, 3–5, 2–0, 1–0			Athens Olympic Aquatic Centre; Referees: Aaron Chaney (USA); Gábor Kiszelly (HUN)
20 August 2004; 18:00	Report	Castle 3 Gynther 3 Heuchan 1	Goals	Asilian 2 Lara 2 Karagianni 1 Moraiti 1 Moraitidou 1	Athens Olympic Aquatic Centre; Referees: Aaron Chaney (USA); Gábor Kiszelly (HUN)

Quarterfinal

22 August 2004; 17:00	Report	Greece	7–4	Russia	Athens Olympic Aquatic Centre; Referees: Zoran Tomić (CRO); Mario Brguljan (SCG)
22 August 2004; 17:00	Report	Score by quarters: 2–1, 3–0, 2–1, 0–2			Athens Olympic Aquatic Centre; Referees: Zoran Tomić (CRO); Mario Brguljan (SCG)
22 August 2004; 17:00	Report	Liosi 2 Roumpesi 2 Asilian 1 Karagianni 1 Oikonomopoulou 1	Goals	Konukh 1 Salimova 1 Smurova 1 Yaina 1	Athens Olympic Aquatic Centre; Referees: Zoran Tomić (CRO); Mario Brguljan (SCG)

Semifinal

24 August 2004; 18:15	Report	Australia	2–6	Greece	Athens Olympic Aquatic Centre; Referees: Pneter Bookelman (NED); Torsten Bock (GER)
24 August 2004; 18:15	Report	Score by quarters: 1–4, 0–1, 1–1, 0–0			Athens Olympic Aquatic Centre; Referees: Pneter Bookelman (NED); Torsten Bock (GER)
24 August 2004; 18:15	Report	Fox 1 Stuhmcke 1	Goals	Roumpesi 2 Karagianni 1 Kozompoli 1 Moraitidou 1 Oikonomopoulou 1	Athens Olympic Aquatic Centre; Referees: Pneter Bookelman (NED); Torsten Bock (GER)

Gold Medal Final

26 August 2004; 18:15	Report	Greece	9–10 (OT)	Italy	Athens Olympic Aquatic Centre; Referees: Boris Margeta (SLO); Gábor Kiszelly (HUN)
26 August 2004; 18:15	Report	Score by quarters: 3–2, 3–3, 0–1, 1–1 OT: 2–2, 0–1			Athens Olympic Aquatic Centre; Referees: Boris Margeta (SLO); Gábor Kiszelly (HUN)
26 August 2004; 18:15	Report	Liosi 5 Moraitidou 3 Oikonomopoulou 1	Goals	Grego 3 Miceli 3 Bosurgi 1 Malato 1 di Mario 1 Zanchi 1	Athens Olympic Aquatic Centre; Referees: Boris Margeta (SLO); Gábor Kiszelly (HUN)

Won Silver Medal

== Weightlifting ==
As the host nation, Greek weightlifters had already received six men's quota places and four women's places for the Olympics.

Men

Athlete	Event	Snatch		Clean & Jerk		Total	Rank
Athlete	Event	Result	Rank	Result	Rank	Total	Rank
Leonidas Sabanis	−62 kg	145	3	167.5	3	~~302.5~~	DSQ*
Viktor Mitrou	−77 kg	160	=6	200	=2	360	4
Pyrros Dimas	−85 kg	175	=3	202.5	4	377.5	3rd place, bronze medalist(s)
Georgios Markoulas	−85 kg	167.5	=6	205	=1	372.5	4
Kakhi Kakhiashvili	−94 kg	180	=4	~~220.0~~	DNF	180	DNF
Nikolaos Kourtidis	−94 kg	167.5	=14	210	=8	377.5	11

* Leonidas Sabanis originally claimed the bronze medal, but was disqualified after being tested positive for excess testosterone.

Women

Athlete	Event	Snatch		Clean & Jerk		Total	Rank
Athlete	Event	Result	Rank	Result	Rank	Total	Rank
Charikleia Kastritsi	−58 kg	90	=11	110	13	200	13
Anastasia Tsakiri	−63 kg	97.5	4	~~117.5~~	DNF	97.5	DNF
Christina Ioannidi	−75 kg	112.5	=7	142.5	=4	255	5
Vasiliki Kasapi	+75 kg	125	=5	152.5	7	277.5	8

== Wrestling ==
Key:

- VT – Victory by Fall.
- PP – Decision by Points – the loser with technical points.
- PO – Decision by Points – the loser without technical points.

Men's freestyle

Athlete	Event	Elimination Pool				Quarterfinal	Semifinal	Final / BM	
Athlete	Event	Opposition Result	Opposition Result	Opposition Result	Rank	Opposition Result	Opposition Result	Opposition Result	Rank
Amiran Kardanov	−55 kg	O S-N (PRK); W 3–1 ^{PP}	Doğan (TUR); W 4–0 ^{ST}	Berberyan (ARM); W 3–1 ^{PP}	1 Q	Bye	Batirov (RUS); L 1–3 ^{PP}	Tanabe (JPN); L 0–3 ^{PO}	4
Besik Aslanasvili	−60 kg	Prizreni (ALB); W 3–1 ^{PP}	Mostafa-Jokar (IRI); L 1–3 ^{PP}	—N/a	2	Did not advance			11
Apostolos Taskoudis	−66 kg	Kumar (IND); W 3–1 ^{PP}	Hovhannisyan (ARM); L 1–3 ^{PP}	—N/a	1 Q	Tedeyev (UKR); L 1–3 ^{PP}	Did not advance	Ikematsu (JPN); L 1–3 ^{PP}	6
Emzarios Bentinidis	−74 kg	Ritter (HUN); W 3–1 ^{PP}	Saitiev (RUS); L 1–3 ^{PP}	—N/a	2	Did not advance			10
Lazaros Loizidis	−84 kg	Mindorashvili (GEO); W 3–1 ^{PP}	Aka-Akesse (FRA); W 3–0 ^{PO}	—N/a	1 Q	Romero (CUB); L 1–3 ^{PP}	Did not advance	Khodaei (IRI); L 0–3 ^{PO}	6
Alexandros Laliotis	−96 kg	Wang Yy (CHN); W 3–1 ^{PP}	Pecha (SVK); L 1–3 ^{PP}	—N/a	3	Did not advance			13
Nestoras Batzelas	−120 kg	Rodríguez (CUB); L 0–4 ^{ST}	Priadun (UKR); W 3–0 ^{PO}	—N/a	2	Did not advance			13

Men's Greco-Roman

Athlete	Event	Elimination Pool				Quarterfinal	Semifinal	Final / BM	
Athlete	Event	Opposition Result	Opposition Result	Opposition Result	Rank	Opposition Result	Opposition Result	Opposition Result	Rank
Artiom Kiouregkian	−55 kg	Nyblom (DEN); W 3–0 ^{PO}	Sheng J (CHN); W 3–0 ^{PO}	Kalilov (KGZ); W 5–0 ^{VT}	1 Q	Bye	Mamedaliyev (RUS); L 1–3 ^{PP}	Vakulenko (UKR); W 3–1 ^{PP}	3rd place, bronze medalist(s)
Christos Gikas	−60 kg	Monzón (CUB); L 0–3 ^{PO}	Tüfenk (TUR); L 0–3 ^{PO}	Ashkani (IRI); L 1–3 ^{PP}	4	Did not advance			20
Konstantinos Arkoudeas	−66 kg	Manukyan (KAZ); L 1–3 ^{PP}	Zamanduridis (GER); W 3–1 ^{PP}	Wood (USA); W 3–1 ^{PP}	2	Did not advance			6
Alexios Kolitsopoulos	−74 kg	Dokturishvili (UZB); L 1–3 ^{PP}	Berzicza (HUN); L 0–3 ^{PO}	Aslanov (AZE); W 3–1 ^{PP}	3	Did not advance			12
Dimitrios Avramis	−84 kg	Jamshidi (IRI); W 3–1 ^{PP}	Aanes (NOR); W 3–1 ^{PP}	—N/a	1 Q	Mishin (RUS); L 1–3 ^{PP}	Did not advance	Abdelfatah (EGY); W 5–0 ^{EV}	5
Georgios Koutsioumpas	−96 kg	Gaber (EGY); L 1–3 ^{PP}	Sitnik (POL); W 3–1 ^{PP}	Mambetov (KAZ); W 3–0 ^{PO}	2	Did not advance			7
Xenofon Koutsioumpas	−120 kg	Tsurtsumia (KAZ); L 1–3 ^{PP}	Bengtsson (SWE); W 3–0 ^{PO}	Giorgadze (GEO); W 3–0 ^{PO}	2	Did not advance			7

Women's freestyle

Athlete	Event	Elimination Pool				Classification	Semifinal	Final / BM	
Athlete	Event	Opposition Result	Opposition Result	Opposition Result	Rank	Opposition Result	Opposition Result	Opposition Result	Rank
Fani Psatha	−48 kg	Merleni (UKR); L 0–4 ^{ST}	Karamchakova (TJK); L 1–3 ^{PP}	Louati (TUN); W 5–0 ^{VT}	3	Did not advance			10
Sofia Poumpouridou	−55 kg	Gomis (FRA); L 1–3 ^{PP}	Lee N-L (KOR); L 0–4 ^{ST}	—N/a	3	Did not advance			11
Stavroula Zygouri	−63 kg	Groß (GER); W 3–1 ^{PP}	Eriksson (SWE); W 3–1 ^{PP}	—N/a	1 Q	Bye	McMann (USA); L 0–3 ^{PO}	Legrand (FRA); L 1–3 ^{PP}	4
Maria Louiza Vryoni	−72 kg	Saenko (UKR); L 1–3 ^{PP}	Burmaa (MGL); W 3–1 ^{PP}	—N/a	2	Schätzle (GER); L 0–5 ^{VT}	Did not advance		8

== See also ==
- Greece at the 2004 Summer Paralympics
- Greece at the 2005 Mediterranean Games
