= Diving at the 2004 Summer Olympics – Men's synchronized 3 metre springboard =

Men's synchronized 3 metre springboard at the Games of the XXVIII Olympiad

Medalists
| 1st place, gold medalist(s) | | Thomas Bimis, Nikolaos Siranidis | Greece |
| 2nd place, silver medalist(s) | | Tobias Schellenberg, Andreas Wels | Germany |
| 3rd place, bronze medalist(s) | | Steven Barnett, Robert Newbery | Australia |

The men's synchronized 3 metre springboard was one of eight diving events included in the Diving at the 2004 Summer Olympics programme.

The competition was held as an outright final:

Final
16 August — Each pair of divers performed five dives freely chosen from the five diving groups, with two dives limited to a 2.0 degree of difficulty and the others without limitation. Divers could perform different dives during the same dive if both presented the same difficulty degree. The final ranking was determined by the score attained by the pair after all five dives had been performed.

== Results ==
The fifth and final round of dives was stage for a bizarre sequence of events, beginning with a spectator jumping into the pool. The then-leaders Peng Bo and Wang Kenan of China failed their final dive, for which they were awarded zero points. The highly regarded Russian pair, although only in fifth place at the time, had a chance to move up in the standings with their final dive, which had a potentially high-scoring 3.5 level of difficulty. One diver, however, hit the edge of the board with his feet halfway through a somersault. The American pair, in second place at the time, also earned shockingly low scores on their final dive by effectively bomb-diving. This left the Greeks, who had already taken their final dive unaware of the imminent melt-down, to claim the gold, Greece's first-ever in diving and the hosts' first gold of the 2004 Athens Olympics.

| Rank | Nation | Dives | | | | | Final score after five dives | Score after four dives | Rank after four dives |
| Rank | Nation | 1 | 2 | 3 | 4 | 5 | Final score after five dives | Score after four dives | Rank after four dives |
|---|---|---|---|---|---|---|---|---|---|
| 1st place, gold medalist(s) | Greece; Thomas Bimis; Nikolaos Siranidis | 54.60 | 52.80 | 78.30 | 84.00 | 83.64 | 353.34 | 269.70 | 4 |
| 2nd place, silver medalist(s) | Germany; Tobias Schellenberg; Andreas Wels | 52.20 | 52.80 | 83.16 | 77.19 | 84.66 | 350.01 | 265.35 | 6 |
| 3rd place, bronze medalist(s) | Australia; Steven Barnett; Robert Newbery | 51.60 | 54.00 | 80.58 | 84.66 | 78.75 | 349.59 | 271.09 | 3 |
| 4 | Cuba; Jorge Betancourt; Erick Fornaris | 52.80 | 54.60 | 78.12 | 69.30 | 83.64 | 338.46 | 254.82 | 8 |
| 5 | Great Britain; Tony Ally; Mark Shipman | 50.40 | 49.80 | 79.98 | 81.90 | 72.90 | 334.98 | 262.08 | 7 |
| 6 | United States; Justin Dumais; Troy Dumais | 51.00 | 51.60 | 79.05 | 89.76 | 55.65 | 327.06 | 271.41 | 2 |
| 7 | Russia; Alexander Dobroskok; Dmitri Sautin | 54.00 | 57.00 | 76.50 | 78.54 | 46.20 | 312.24 | 266.04 | 5 |
| 8 | China; Peng Bo; Wang Kenan | 51.60 | 54.00 | 86.49 | 91.80 | 0.00 | 283.89 | 283.89 | 1 |

== Sources ==
- "Diving Results". Athens 2004 Summer Olympics. Yahoo!.
- Diving. Official Report of the XXVIII Olympiad - Results
