= Sophia Smith (soccer, born 1978) =

American-Greek soccer player (born 1978)

Personal information
- Full name: Sophia Antonia Smith
- Date of birth: 18 November 1978 (age 47)
- Place of birth: Houston, Texas, U.S.
- Position: Midfielder

College career
Years	Team	Apps	(Gls)
1997–2001	Cornell Big Red		

Senior career*
Years	Team	Apps	(Gls)
2004	Houston Stars		

International career
2004	Greece	3	(0)
- * Club domestic league appearances and goals

Sophia Antonia Smith (born 18 November 1978) is a retired soccer player who played as a midfielder. She played for Cornell University and the Houston Stars, and was a member of the Greece national team.

== College career ==
Smith played for the Cornell Big Red women's soccer team as a striker noted for her speed. During her junior year in 1999, she was the leading scorer on the team, with seven goals and four assists. She lettered for three years, for a college career total of nine goals and seven assists, including two game-winning goals for Cornell. She was unable to return to competition for her senior year due to an invasive knee surgery for a torn ACL, sustained during the previous year's season finale against Yale.

== Club career ==
Smith played for the Houston Stars in the Women's Professional Soccer League and the Houston Women's Soccer Association in the United States.

== International career ==
Smith played for Greece in the 2004 Summer Olympics in Athens as a midfielder, taking a leave of absence from her final semester of law school to train with the national women's team, which automatically qualified for the competition as the Olympic hosts. She was one of eight American players of Greek ancestry on the team who had college soccer experience. Due to the Greek Soccer Federation's sensitivity about players on the team with American-sounding surnames, her jersey simply read "Sophia". On August 11, 2004, she started in Greece's opening match against the United States, which was won 3–0 by Team USA.

== See also ==
- Greece at the 2004 Summer Olympics
