= Troupis =

Troupis is a surname. Notable people with the surname include:

- Andreas Troupis (born 1973), Greek handball player
- Jim Troupis (born 1953), American lawyer and political operative
