= Luis Labastida =

Mexican footballer (born 1975)

Personal information
- Date of birth: April 11, 1975 (age 51)
- Place of birth: Mexico
- Height: 5 ft 9 in (1.75 m)
- Positions: Forward; midfielder

Senior career*
Years	Team	Apps	(Gls)
1997–1998	Albuquerque Geckos	36	(31)
1998	Montreal Impact	2	(0)
1999–2000	Minnesota Thunder	42	(10)
2001	Cincinnati Riverhawks	6	(1)
2002	California Gold	12	(2)

Managerial career
- 2003–2005: Houston Stars
- * Club domestic league appearances and goals

Luis Labastida is a retired Mexican-born football player who played professionally in the USL A-League and coached in the Women’s Premier Soccer League.

== Player ==
In 1985 at aged ten, Labastida and his family moved to the United States from Mexico. He played youth soccer in both Oklahoma and Florida. He may have played in Europe and Mexico. In 1997, Labastida signed with the Albuquerque Geckos of the USISL D-3 Pro League. He scored twenty goals in eleven games, placing him second on the league’s scoring table. In 1998, the Geckos moved up to the second division USISL A-League. Labastida continued his scoring exploits, with eleven goals in twenty-five games. At the end of the season, Labastida also played two games with the Montreal Impact. In 1999, Labastida moved to the Minnesota Thunder where he played for two seasons. In January 2001, Labastida signed with the Cincinnati Riverhawks. He finished his career with the California Gold in 2002.

== Coach ==
Labastida was a co-founder and head coach of the Houston Stars of the Women's Premier Soccer League from 2003 to 2005.
