= Diving at the 2004 Summer Olympics – Men's synchronized 10 metre platform =

Men's synchronized 10 metre platform at the Games of the XXVIII Olympiad

Medalists
| 1st place, gold medalist(s) | | Tian Liang; Yang Jinghui | China |
| 2nd place, silver medalist(s) | | Peter Waterfield; Leon Taylor | Great Britain |
| 3rd place, bronze medalist(s) | | Mathew Helm; Robert Newbery | Australia |

The men's synchronized 10 metre platform was one of eight diving events included in the Diving at the 2004 Summer Olympics programme.

The competition was held as an outright final:

Final
14 August — Each pair of divers performed five dives freely chosen from the five diving groups, with two dives limited to a 2.0 degree of difficulty and the others without limitation. Divers could perform different dives during the same dive if both presented the same difficulty degree. The final ranking was determined by the score attained by the pair after all five dives had been performed.

== Results ==
| Rank | Nation | Dives | | | | | Total |
| Rank | Nation | 1 | 2 | 3 | 4 | 5 | Total |
|---|---|---|---|---|---|---|---|
| 1st place, gold medalist(s) | China; Tian Liang; Yang Jinghui | 55.80 | 56.40 | 87.72 | 92.16 | 91.80 | 383.88 |
| 2nd place, silver medalist(s) | Great Britain; Peter Waterfield; Leon Taylor | 54.60 | 51.00 | 87.12 | 88.74 | 90.06 | 371.52 |
| 3rd place, bronze medalist(s) | Australia; Mathew Helm; Robert Newbery | 56.40 | 52.20 | 82.62 | 81.00 | 94.62 | 366.84 |
| 4 | Ukraine; Roman Volod'kov; Anton Zakharov | 55.20 | 55.20 | 81.18 | 83.52 | 82.56 | 357.66 |
| 5 | Canada; Philippe Comtois; Alexandre Despatie | 51.00 | 51.60 | 80.58 | 82.08 | 86.64 | 351.90 |
| 6 | Russia; Dmitry Dobroskok; Gleb Galperin | 52.80 | 58.20 | 76.50 | 71.04 | 90.06 | 348.60 |
| 7 | Greece; Sotirios Trakas; Ioannis Gavriilidis | 50.40 | 50.40 | 67.50 | 82.56 | 80.58 | 331.44 |
| 8 | United States; Mark Ruiz; Kyle Prandi | 53.40 | 39.00 | 81.60 | 73.92 | 77.52 | 325.44 |

== Sources ==
- "Diving Results". Athens 2004 Summer Olympics. Yahoo!.
- Diving. Official Report of the XXVIII Olympiad - Results
