= Joanna Gail =

Greek-American softball player (1986–2023)

Joanna Vargas
Personal information
- Full name: Joanna Adaline Gail Vargas
- Nickname: Jo
- Nationality: Greek-American
- Born: Joanna Adaline Gail; 11 April 1986 Redondo Beach, California, United States
- Died: 19 August 2023 (aged 37)
- Education: University of Oregon
- Height: 5 ft 9 in (175 cm)
- Spouse: Brittany Vargas

Sport
- Country: Greece
- Sport: Softball
- Position: Third-baseman
- University team: Oregon Ducks softball
- League: National Pro Fastpitch League
- Club: Connecticut Brakettes

Achievements and titles
- Olympic finals: 2004 Summer Olympics
- World finals: 2006 Women's Softball World Championship
- National finals: Amateur Softball Association Fastpitch championship, 2007

Joanna Adaline Gail Vargas (11 April 1986 – 19 August 2023) was a Greek-American softball player. She competed in the women's tournament at the 2004 Summer Olympics.

== Biography ==
Gail Vargas was from Poway, California. Growing up, Gail played on a boy's Little League baseball team until seventh grade, rather than playing softball. Her parents were also athletes, her father played baseball at La Salle University and her mother was a cheerleader and tennis player at Iowa State. Gail reportedly hated softball before playing it competitively, instead preferring the overhand pitch and smaller ball in baseball. In high school, she played softball and soccer at Poway High School. During her senior year in high school, she led the team in batting average, slugging percentage, home runs and doubles. She was named the team MVP and the Pepsi Player of the Year award.

=== 2004 Olympics ===
In the summer after her senior year of high school, she earned a position to play for the Greek Olympic team at the 2004 Olympic Games in Athens. Her mother is of Greek descent. After months of tryouts she made the team, becoming the second youngest player on the team, as one of two high school players to make the team.

=== College ===
She would go on to play for the University of Oregon, making her debut in 2005. In the summer of her freshman year, she would go to play third base for the Dornbirn Sharx in the Austrian Softball League. At Oregon, her play continued to develop and she made 50 appearances in her sophomore year.

In August 2006, she competed for Team Greece in the International Softball Federation Women's Softball World Championships in Beijing, China. Greece would ultimately place ninth in the competition.

During her junior year at Oregon, she was voted as the team's Defensive MVP and athlete of the week. In 2007, Oregon made it to the Columbia Regional Finals, ultimately placing 7th in their division.

Outside of playing for Oregon, Gail played third base for the Connecticut Brakettes in the Amateur Softball Association league. While playing for the Brakettes, Gail was part of the team that won the 2007 ASA Women’s Major Fast Pitch Nationals Championship.

In her final year at Oregon, she kept a team diary sharing her thoughts about the team's games and to update fans.

After graduation, she reportedly would go on to play in the National Pro Fastpitch League. Later, Gail married her wife Brittany Vargas, taking her last name. The couple would go on to have three children together.

=== Death ===
In the summer of 2023, Vargas was diagnosed with B-Cell Acute Lymphoblastic Leukemia. On August 18, she contracted bacterial meningitis and was admitted to intensive care. She died the next day on August 19, 2023 at age 37.
