= Alexandros Tsoltos =

Greek swimmer (born 1979)

Personal information
- Full name: Alexandros Tsoltos
- National team: Greece
- Born: 14 February 1979 (age 47) Athens, Greece
- Height: 1.90 m (6 ft 3 in)
- Weight: 90 kg (198 lb)

Sport
- Sport: Swimming
- Strokes: Freestyle
- Club: Olympiakos Athina

Alexandros Tsoltos (Greek: Αλέξανδρος Τσόλτος; born February 14, 1979) is a Greek former swimmer, who specialized in freestyle events. Tsoltos qualified only for the men's 4×100 m freestyle relay, as a member of the Greek team, at the 2004 Summer Olympics in Athens. Teaming with Aristeidis Grigoriadis, Andreas Zisimos, and Spyridon Bitsakis in heat two, Tsoltos swam a second leg and recorded a split of 51.03, but the Greeks settled only for seventh place and fourteenth overall in a final time of 3:24.26.
