= Peter Soteropoulos =

Greek baseball player (born 1981)

- Pitcher
- Born: August 5, 1981 (age 44); Danvers, Massachusetts, U.S.
- Bats: Left Throws: Left
- Stats at Baseball Reference
Medals
Men's baseball
Representing Greece
European Baseball Championship
Silver medal – second place	2003 Netherlands	National team

Peter Francis Soteropoulos (born 5 August 1981) is a Greek-American baseball player who competed in the 2004 Summer Olympics.

== Biography ==
A native of Peabody, Massachusetts, Soteropoulos played college baseball at the University of Connecticut. As a freshman in 2000, he posted a 7–4 record on the mound with a 2.89 ERA, earning All-Big East Rookie Team honors. In 2001, he batted .364 with 60 hits, tossed 18 innings on the mound with a 4.50 ERA, and was named a third-team all-Big East Conference selection. After the 2001 season, he played collegiate summer baseball with the Chatham A's of the Cape Cod Baseball League. In his junior season in 2002, he was named All-Big East Conference second-team, while batting .371 with 46 RBI, and going 2–1 on the mound with a 1.33 ERA. As a senior at UConn, he was a first-team all-Big East selection, batting .381 with 43 RBI.

In 2003, Soteropoulos was a member of the silver medal-winning Greek National Baseball Team at the 2003 European Baseball Championship, appearing in 2 games, recording a win vs Russia. He was selected by the St. Louis Cardinals in the 40th round of the 2003 MLB draft. He played in the Cardinals' system in 2003 with the Johnson City Cardinals and the New Jersey Cardinals, and in 2004 with the Peoria Chiefs, compiling a 2–2 record with a 3.29 ERA in 44 games. He competed for the home standing Greek team in the 2004 Athens Olympics, posting a 0–1 record on the mound.
