= Stephanie Skegas-Maxwell =

Greek softball player (born 1968)

Personal information
- Nationality: Greek
- Born: 30 August 1968 (age 56); Torrance, California, United States

Sport
- Sport: Softball

Stephanie Skegas-Maxwell (born 30 August 1968) is a Greek softball player. She competed in the women's tournament at the 2004 Summer Olympics. At the collegiate level she played for the Nebraska Cornhuskers.
