= Nikos Kokolodimitrakis =

Greek handball player (born 1981)

Personal information
- Nationality: Greek
- Born: 7 April 1981 (age 45) Chania, Greece

Sport
- Sport: Handball
- Position: Pivot

Youth career
- Years: Team
- –1999: Peristeri Chania

Senior clubs
- Years: Team
- 1999–2004: Ionikos Nea Filadelfeia
- 2004–2005: Pfadi Winterthur
- 2005–2007: HSG Düsseldorf
- 2007–2008: ASE Douka
- 2008–2011: Kydonas Chania
- 2011–2012: AEK Athens
- 2015–2016: Fthia Lamias
- 2016: Panellinios
National team
- Years: Team
- 2000–2012: Greece

Nikos Kokolodimitrakis (born 7 April 1981) is a Greek retired handball player. He competed in the men's tournament at the 2004 Summer Olympics.
