= Stacey Farnworth =

Greek softball player (born 1979)

Personal information
- Nationality: Greek
- Born: 11 November 1979 (age 45); San Bernardino, California, United States

Sport
- Sport: Softball

Stacey Farnworth (born 11 November 1979) is a Greek softball player. She competed in the women's tournament at the 2004 Summer Olympics.
