= Katina Kramos =

Greek softball player (born 1972)

Personal information
- Nationality: Greek
- Born: 12 July 1972 (age 53) Kansas City, Missouri, United States

Sport
- Sport: Softball

Katina Kramos (born 12 July 1972) is a former Greek softball player and is currently the head coach at Illinois State. She competed in the women's tournament at the 2004 Summer Olympics.

In 2022, Kramos was named as the new head coach for the Illinois State Redbirds after Melinda Fischer announced her retirement.
