= Lindsey Bashor =

Greek softball player (born 1983)

Personal information
- Nationality: Greek
- Born: 26 May 1983 (age 41); Riverside, California, United States

Sport
- Sport: Softball

Lindsey Bashor (born 26 May 1983) is a Greek softball player. She competed in the women's tournament at the 2004 Summer Olympics, as well as the 2006 Women's Softball World Championship.

Bashor attended Santiago High School in Corona, California, where she won league offensive player of the year honors as a senior. She played for the Iowa Hawkeyes, leading them to the college national championship game in her sophomore year, during which she earned second-team all-conference honors. Bashor then transferred to Cal State Fullerton, finishing her college career with the Titans.
