= Houston Stars (WPSL) =

Houston Stars was an American women's soccer team, founded in 2003. The team was a member of the Women's Premier Soccer League, the third tier of women’s soccer in the United States and Canada, until 2005, when the team left the league and the franchise was terminated.

Coached by Luis Labastida, the team joined the WPSL in 2003 in the provisional conference using the name the SWC Houston Stars. In 2004, the league placed the team in the south division. The Stars played their home games at Soccer World Center in Richmond, Texas.

== Year-by-year ==
Year	Division	League	Reg. season	Playoffs
2003	2	WPSL	3rd, Provisional	Did not qualify
2004	2	WPSL	3rd, South	Did not qualify
2005	2	WPSL	2nd, Central	Did not qualify
