= Ioanna Bouziou =

Greek softball player (born 1973)

Personal information
- Nationality: Greek
- Born: 14 May 1973 (age 51); Korydallos, Greece

Sport
- Sport: Softball

Ioanna Bouziou (born 14 May 1973) is a Greek softball player. She competed in the women's tournament at the 2004 Summer Olympics.
