= Chloe Kloezeman =

Greek softball player (born 1986)

Personal information
- Nationality: Greek
- Born: 29 May 1986 (age 38); Burlingame, California, United States

Sport
- Sport: Softball

Chloe Kloezeman (born 29 May 1986) is a Greek softball player. She competed in the women's tournament at the 2004 Summer Olympics. Kloezeman was raised in Millbrae, California, and is of Greek descent from her mother's side. At the collegiate level, Kloezeman played for Ole Miss and UC Berkeley.

Kloezeman later worked for Pixar.
