= Eleni Potari =

Greek handball player (1982–2023)

Personal information
- Native name: Ελένη Πόταρη
- Nationality: Greek
- Born: 25 August 1982 Athens, Greece
- Died: 9 October 2023 (aged 41) Athens, Greece

Sport
- Event: Handball

Achievements and titles
- Olympic finals: 2004

Eleni Potari (Greek: Ελένη Πόταρη; 25 August 1982 – 9 October 2023) was a Greek handball player who competed in the 2004 Summer Olympics.

Eleni Potari died of cancer on 9 October 2023, at the age of 41.
