= Tatiana Sousa =

Greek handball player (born 1975)

Tatiana Sousa (born 16 February 1975) is a Greek handball player who competed in the 2004 Summer Olympics.
