= Sofia Kligkopoulou =

Greek basketball player

Sofia Kligkopoulou (alternate spelling: Kligopoulou; born 6 January 1970) is a Greek former basketball player who competed with the senior Greek women's national team at the 2004 Athens Summer Olympics.
