= Styliani Gioupi =

Greek handball player (born 1978)

Styliani Gioupi (born 6 February 1978) is a Greek handball player who competed in the 2004 Summer Olympics.
