= Ioannis Gavriilidis =

Greek diver (born 1982)

Personal information
- Native name: Ιωάννης Γαβριηλίδης
- Nationality: Greek
- Born: 24 January 1982 (age 43); Piraeus, Attica, Greece
- Height: 176 cm (5 ft 9 in)
- Weight: 74 kg (163 lb)

Sport
- Sport: Diving

Ioannis "Giannis" Gavriilidis (Greek: Ιωάννης "Γιάννης" Γαβριηλίδης; born 24 January 1982) is a former Greek diver. He competed in the synchronised 10 metre platform, along with Sotirios Trakas, and the 10 metre platform events at the 2004 Summer Olympics in Athens.
