= Vangelis-Giorgos Voglis =

Greek handball player (born 1977)

Personal information
- Born: 17 December 1977 (age 48) Stockholm, Sweden

Sport
- Sport: Handball
- Position: Winger

Senior clubs
- Years: Team
- –: Tyresö Handboll
- –2003: Hammarby
- 2003–: Djurgården
- –: AEK
- 2007–: HCM Constanța
National team
- Years: Team
- –: Greece

Teams managed
- 2017: GT Söder

Vangelis-Giorgos Voglis or Vaggo Schjölin (born on 17 December 1977) is a Stockholm-born Greek Olympic handball player. Vangelis played as a winger.

== Career ==
Voglis played club handball for Tyresö Handboll and Hammarby IF, before joining Djurgårdens IF in 2003. Voglis then represented AEK. In 2007, he joined HCM Constanța.

Voglis competed in the men's handball tournament at the 2004 Summer Olympics. Voglis also played in the 2005 World Men's Handball Championship.

In 2017, he became manager for GT Söder.
