= Gregor Chatsatourian =

Greek handball player (born 1977)

Personal information
- Nationality: Greek
- Born: 19 April 1977 (age 47); Athens, Greece

Sport
- Sport: Handball

Gregor Chatsatourian (born 19 April 1977) is a Greek handball player. He competed in the men's tournament at the 2004 Summer Olympics.
