= Michaela Michalopoulou =

Greek handball player (born 1980)

Michaela Michalopoulou (born 20 April 1980) is a Greek handball player who competed in the 2004 Summer Olympics.
