= Angeliki Karapataki =

Greek water polo player

Personal information
- Born: 19 February 1975 (age 51) Athens, Greece
- Height: 170 cm (5 ft 7 in)
- Weight: 58 kg (128 lb)
Medal record
Women's water polo
Representing Greece
Olympic Games
Silver medal – second place	2004 Athens	Team competition

Angeliki Karapataki (Greek: Αγγελική Καραπατάκη, born 19 February 1975) is a Greek water polo player and Olympic silver medalist with the Greek national women's team.

She received a silver medal at the 2004 Summer Olympics in Athens.

== See also ==
- List of Olympic medalists in water polo (women)
