= Anna Psatha =

Greek handball player (born 1975)

Anna Psatha (born 8 February 1975) is a Greek handball player who competed in the 2004 Summer Olympics.
