= Vanessa Czarnecki =

Greek softball player (born 1979)

Personal information
- Nationality: Greek
- Born: 21 December 1979 (age 46) Fontana, California, United States

Sport
- Sport: Softball

Vanessa Czarnecki (born 21 December 1979) is a Greek softball player. She competed in the women's tournament at the 2004 Summer Olympics. A native of California, Czarnecki is of Greek descent and played collegiate softball with the Fresno State Bulldogs.
