= Spyridon Bitsakis =

Greek swimmer (born 1981)

Personal information
- Full name: Spyridon Bitsakis
- Nickname: Spiros
- National team: Greece
- Born: 4 March 1981 (age 45) Marousi, Greece
- Height: 2.00 m (6 ft 7 in)
- Weight: 86 kg (190 lb)

Sport
- Sport: Swimming
- Strokes: Freestyle
- Club: Olympiakos Athina
- College team: University of Alabama (U.S.)
- Coach: Don Gambril (U.S)

Spyridon "Spiros" Bitsakis (Greek: Σπυρίδων Μπιτσάκης; born March 4, 1981) is a Greek former swimmer, who specialized in freestyle events. He is a two-time Olympian (2000 and 2004), and a 2003 All-American swimmer in the 100 m freestyle, while studying in the United States. He is one of two Greek swimmers, alongside Apostolos Tsagkarakis, who trained for the Alabama Crimson Tide, under head coach Don Gambril, at the University of Alabama in Tuscaloosa.

== Senior career ==
Bitsakis made his official debut at the 2000 Summer Olympics in Sydney. He failed to reach the top 16 in the 100 m freestyle, finishing in a thirty-fourth place tie with Kyrgyzstan's Sergey Ashihmin at 51.28. He also placed fifteenth, along with Athanasios Oikonomou, Spyridon Gianniotis, and Dimitrios Manganas, in the 4 × 200 m freestyle relay (7:35.77).

When his home nation Greece hosted the 2004 Summer Olympics in Athens, Bitsakis competed only as a relay swimmer in the men's 4 × 100 m freestyle. Teaming with Aristeidis Grigoriadis, Andreas Zisimos, and Alexandros Tsoltos in heat two, Bitsakis swam a third leg and recorded a split of 52.25, but the Greeks settled only for seventh place and fourteenth overall in a final time of 3:24.26.
