= Vicky Theodoridou =

Greek handball player (born 1982)

Vasiliki "Vicky" Theodoridou (born 27 January 1982), is a Greek handball player who competed in the 2004 Summer Olympics.
