= Panagoula Vemi =

Greek handball player (born 1971)

Panagoula Vemi (born 26 May 1971 in Patras, Greece) is a Greek handball player who competed in the 2004 Summer Olympics. She played as a playmaker.

She played for GAS Anagennisi Artas her entire career from 1997 to 2005.
