= Antonia Moraiti =

Greek water polo player

Personal information
- Born: 2 May 1977 (age 49) Athens, Greece

Sport
- Sport: Water polo
Medal record
Representing Greece
Olympic Games
Silver medal – second place	2004 Athens	Team competition

Antonia "Tonia" Moraiti (Greek: Αντωνία "Τόνια" Μωραϊτη, born 2 May 1977) is a Greek water polo player and Olympic silver medalist. She is part of the Greek women's national team.

== Career ==
Moraiti won a silver medal at the 2004 Summer Olympics in 2004 Athens.

== See also ==
- List of Olympic medalists in water polo (women)
