= Evangelia Moraitidou =

Greek water polo player

Personal information
- Born: 26 March 1975 (age 51) Athens, Greece

Sport
- Sport: Water polo
Medal record
Representing Greece
Olympic Games
| Silver medal – second place | 2004 Athens | Team competition |
FINA Water Polo World League
| Gold medal – first place | 2005 Kirishi | Team competition |
| Bronze medal – third place | 2007 Montreal | Team competition |

Evangelia "Evi" Moraitidou (Greek: Ευαγγελία "Εύη" Μωραϊτίδου, born 26 March 1975) is a female Greek water polo player and Olympic silver medalist with the Greece women's national water polo team.

She received a silver medal at the 2004 Summer Olympics in 2004 Athens.

She received a gold medal with the Greek team at the 2005 FINA Women's Water Polo World League in Kirishi, and a bronze medal at the 2007 FINA Women's Water Polo World League in Montreal, where she scored 18 goals and ranked 5th on the scoring list.

She participated at the 2008 Women's Water Polo Olympic Qualifier in Imperia, where Greece finished 4th and qualified for the 2008 Olympics in Beijing.

== See also ==
- Greece women's Olympic water polo team records and statistics
- List of Olympic medalists in water polo (women)
