= Polymnia Saregkou =

Greek basketball player

Polymnia Saregkou (alternate spellings: Polimnia, Saregou; born 11 May 1972) is a Greek former basketball player who competed with the senior Greek women's national team at the 2004 Athens Summer Olympics.
