= Meleti Ross Melehes =

Greek baseball player (born 1977)

Meleti Melehes
- Pitcher
- Born: 7 January 1977 (age 49); Guelph, Ontario, Canada
- Bats: Left Throws: Left
Medals
Men's baseball
Representing Greece
European Baseball Championship
Silver medal – second place	2003 Netherlands	National team

Meleti Ross Melehes (born 7 January 1977) is a Greek baseball player who competed in the 2004 Summer Olympics. He played for the London Werewolves of the Frontier League in 1999. His 3.00 ERA led all Greek team pitchers with 3+ innings in the Athens Games.
