= Katerina Koutoungou =

Greek softball player (born 1976)

Personal information
- Nationality: Greek
- Born: 21 July 1976 (age 48); London, Ontario, Canada

Sport
- Sport: Softball

Katerina Koutoungou (born 21 July 1976) is a Greek softball player. She competed in the women's tournament at the 2004 Summer Olympics.
