= Jiotsa Khrysopoulos =

Greek handball player (born 1969)

Jiotsa Chrysopoulos
Personal information
- Nationality: Greek
- Born: 29 July 1969 (age 57) Zemun, SR Serbia, SFR Yugoslavia
- Height: 1.91 m (6 ft 3 in)

Sport
- Sport: Handball
- Position: goalkeeper

Senior clubs
- Years: Team
- ?-?: Barakaldo UPV Bilbao
National team
- Years: Team
- ?-?: Greece

Jiotsa Khrysopoulos (Greek: Γιάννης Χρυσόπουλος, born 29 July 1969) is a Serbian-born Greek male handball player. He was a member of the Greece men's national handball team, playing as a goalkeeper. He was a part of the team at the 2004 Summer Olympics. On club level he played for Barakaldo UPV Bilbao in Spain.
