= Eftychia Karagianni =

Greece water polo player

Personal information
- Born: 10 October 1973 (age 52) Piraeus, Greece

Sport
- Sport: Water polo
Medal record
Representing Greece
Olympic Games
Silver medal – second place	2004 Athens	Team competition
FINA Water Polo World League
Gold medal – first place	2005 Kirishi	Team competition

Eftychia Karagianni (Greek: Ευτυχία Καραγιάννη, born 10 October 1973) is a female Greek water polo player and Olympic silver medalist with the Greece women's national water polo team.

She received a silver medal at the 2004 Summer Olympics in 2004 Athens.

She received a gold medal with the Greece women's national water polo team at the 2005 FINA Women's Water Polo World League in Kirishi, where she scored 19 goals.

== See also ==
- List of Olympic medalists in water polo (women)
