= Sotirios Trakas =

Greek diver (born 1987)

Personal information
- Native name: Σωτήριος Τράκας
- Nationality: Greek
- Born: 13 January 1987 (age 38); Athens, Attica, Greece
- Height: 170 cm (5 ft 7 in)
- Weight: 62 kg (137 lb)

Sport
- Sport: Diving

Sotirios Trakas (Greek: Σωτήριος Τράκας; born 13 January 1987) is a former Greek diver. He competed in the synchronised 10 metre platform, along with Ioannis Gavriilidis, and the 10 metre platform events at the 2004 Summer Olympics in his hometown of Athens.
