= Jared Theodorakos =

Jared G. Theodorakos (born March 15, 1981) is a professional baseball pitcher who played internationally for the Greece national baseball team.

== Baseball career ==
A native of St. Louis, Missouri, Theodorakos attended Baylor University and played on their baseball team for five seasons, from 1999 through 2004. On February 18, 2002, the Big 12 Conference named him co-Player of the Week. In 2002, he played collegiate summer baseball with the Bourne Braves of the Cape Cod Baseball League. The Colorado Rockies selected him in the 49th round of the 2002 draft, but he elected not to sign and returned to school. The Milwaukee Brewers selected him in the 25th round the next year, watched his performance through the 2004 college season, and then signed him as a "draft and follow" on June 2.

The Brewers started him out at their rookie-level affiliate in Helena, Montana, but he left the club at the end of June to take a spot on the Greek national team and compete in the 2004 Summer Olympics. 22 of the 24 players on the squad were, like Theodorakos, American players of Greek ancestry. Theodorakos was the starter in the team's second game, pitching six innings in a 5-4 loss to Cuba, the defending silver medalist who would go on to win the gold in 2004. He also started Greece's game against Italy on August 21. He was not as successful in that game, surrendering five earned runs in only three innings of work, but Greece rallied to take the lead in the seventh inning and ultimately notched its only win of the tournament.
