= Jamie Farnworth =

Greek softball player (born 1982)

Personal information
- Nationality: Greek
- Born: 14 January 1982 (age 43); San Bernardino, California, United States

Sport
- Sport: Softball

Jamie Farnworth (born 14 January 1982) is a Greek softball player. She competed in the women's tournament at the 2004 Summer Olympics.
