= Thomas Bimis =

Greek diver (born 1975)

Personal information
- Born: 11 June 1975 (age 51) Athens, Greece
- Height: 1.69 m (5 ft 7 in)
Medal record
Men's diving
Representing Greece
Olympic Games
Gold medal – first place	2004 Athens	3 m springboard synchronized

Thomas Bimis (born 11 June 1975) is a Greek diver. He was born in Athens.

== Career ==
Bimis competed in the synchronised 3 metre springboard competition at the 2004 Summer Olympics, where he won the gold medal together with Nikolaos Siranidis. This was Greece's first-ever gold medal in diving and the hosts' first gold of the 2004 Athens Olympics, and the diver pair therefore became very popular in Greece.

Bimis also competed in the 2000 Olympic Games in Sydney, where he placed 32nd in the 3 Metre Springboard competition.
