= Nikolaos Siranidis =

Greek diver (born 1976)

Personal information
- Nickname: Nikos
- Born: 26 February 1976 (age 50) Athens, Greece
- Height: 1.75 m (5 ft 9 in)
- Weight: 75 kg (165 lb)
Medal record
Men's diving
Representing Greece
Olympic Games
Gold medal – first place	2004 Athens	3 m springboard synchronized

Nikolaos "Nikos" Siranidis (Greek: Νικόλαος "Νίκος" Σιρανίδης; born 26 February 1976) is a Greek diver who competed in the synchronised 3 metre springboard competition at the 2004 Summer Olympics. After a bizarre event where the Chinese, Russian and American teams failed, Siranidis won the gold medal together with Thomas Bimis. This was Greece's first-ever gold medal in diving and the hosts' first gold of the 2004 Athens Olympics, and the diver pair therefore became very popular in Greece.

Siranidis also competed in the 2000 Olympic Games in Sydney, where he placed 36th in the men's 3 metre springboard.

He was born in Athens.
