= Andreas Troupis =

Greek handball player (born 1973)

Personal information
- Nationality: Greek
- Born: 5 April 1973 (age 51); Melbourne, Australia

Sport
- Sport: Handball

Andreas Troupis (born 5 April 1973) is a Greek handball player. He competed in the men's tournament at the 2004 Summer Olympics.
