= Italy at the 2004 Summer Olympics =

- IOC code: ITA
- NOC: Italian National Olympic Committee
- Website: coni.it (in Italian)

in Athens
- Competitors: 364 in 27 sports
- Flag bearer: Jury Chechi
- Medals Ranked 8th: Gold 10 Silver 11 Bronze 11 Total 32

Summer Olympics appearances (overview)
- 1896; 1900; 1904; 1908; 1912; 1920; 1924; 1928; 1932; 1936; 1948; 1952; 1956; 1960; 1964; 1968; 1972; 1976; 1980; 1984; 1988; 1992; 1996; 2000; 2004; 2008; 2012; 2016; 2020; 2024

Other related appearances
- 1906 Intercalated Games

Italy competed at the 2004 Summer Olympics in Athens, Greece, from the 13th to the 29th of August 2004. The country has competed at every Summer Olympic games in the modern era, except for the 1904 Summer Olympics in St. Louis. The Italian National Olympic Committee (Italian: Comitato Olimpico Nazionale Italiano, CONI) sent the nation's largest ever delegation in history to the Games. A total of 364 athletes, 229 men and 135 women, competed in 27 sports.

== Medalists ==
Medal	Name	Sport	Event	Date
Gold	Paolo Bettini	Cycling	Men's road race	August 14
Gold	Aldo Montano	Fencing	Men's individual sabre	August 14
Gold	Valentina Vezzali	Fencing	Women's individual foil	August 18
Gold	Marco Galiazzo	Archery	Men's individual	August 19
Gold	Ivano Brugnetti	Athletics	Men's 20 km walk	August 21
Gold	Andrea Cassarà; Salvatore Sanzo; Simone Vanni	Fencing	Men's team foil	August 21
Gold	Andrea Benelli	Shooting	Men's skeet	August 22
Gold	Igor Cassina	Gymnastics	Men's horizontal bar	August 23
Gold	Italy women's national water polo team: Carmela Allucci; Alexandra Araujo; Silvia Bosurgi; Francesca Conti; Tania di Mario; Elena Gigli; Melania Grego; Giusi Malato; Martina Miceli; Maddalena Musumeci; Cinzia Ragusa; Noémi Tóth; Manuela Zanchi	Water polo	Women's tournament	August 26
Gold	Stefano Baldini	Athletics	Men's marathon	August 29
Silver	Giovanni Pellielo	Shooting	Men's trap	August 15
Silver	Salvatore Sanzo	Fencing	Men's individual foil	August 16
Silver	Federica Pellegrini	Swimming	Women's 200 m freestyle	August 17
Silver	Giovanna Trillini	Fencing	Women's individual foil	August 18
Silver	Aldo Montano; Gianpiero Pastore; Luigi Tarantino	Fencing	Men's team sabre	August 19
Silver	Valentina Turisini	Shooting	Women's 50 m rifle 3 positions	August 20
Silver	Beniamino Bonomi; Antonio Rossi	Canoeing	Men's K-2 1000 m	August 28
Silver	Josefa Idem	Canoeing	Women's K-1 500 m	August 28
Silver	Elisa Blanchi; Fabrizia D'Ottavio; Marinella Falca; Daniela Masseroni; Elisa Santoni; Laura Vernizzi	Gymnastics	Women's rhythmic group all-around	August 28
Silver	Italy national basketball team: Gianluca Basile; Massimo Bulleri; Roberto Chiacig; Giacomo Galanda; Luca Garri; Denis Marconato; Michele Mian; Gianmarco Pozzecco; Nikola Radulović; Alex Righetti; Rodolfo Rombaldoni; Matteo Soragna	Basketball	Men's tournament	August 29
Silver	Italy men's national volleyball team: Matej Černič; Alberto Cisolla; Paolo Cozzi; Alessandro Fei; Andrea Giani; Luigi Mastrangelo; Samuele Papi; Damiano Pippi; Andrea Sartoretti; Venceslav Simeonov; Paolo Tofoli; Valerio Vermiglio	Volleyball	Men's tournament	August 29
Bronze	Andrea Cassarà	Fencing	Men's individual foil	August 16
Bronze	Emiliano Brembilla; Federico Cappellazzo; Simone Cercato; Filippo Magnini; Matteo Pelliciari; Massimiliano Rosolino	Swimming	Men's 4 × 200 m freestyle relay	August 17
Bronze	Lucia Morico	Judo	Women's 78 kg	August 19
Bronze	Rossano Galtarossa; Alessio Sartori	Rowing	Men's double sculls	August 21
Bronze	Luca Agamennoni; Dario Dentale; Raffaello Leonardo; Lorenzo Porzio	Rowing	Men's four	August 21
Bronze	Jury Chechi	Gymnastics	Men's rings	August 22
Bronze	Catello Amarante; Salvatore Amitrano; Lorenzo Bertini; Bruno Mascarenhas	Rowing	Men's lightweight four	August 22
Bronze	Alessandra Sensini	Sailing	Women's sailboard	August 25
Bronze	Giuseppe Gibilisco	Athletics	Men's pole vault	August 27
Bronze	Roberto Cammarelle	Boxing	Super heavyweight	August 28
Bronze	Italy national football team: Andrea Barzagli; Daniele Bonera; Cesare Bovo; Giorgio Chiellini; Simone Del Nero; Daniele De Rossi; Marco Donadel; Matteo Ferrari; Andrea Gasbarroni; Alberto Gilardino; Giandomenico Mesto; Emiliano Moretti; Angelo Palombo; Ivan Pelizzoli; Giampiero Pinzi; Andrea Pirlo; Giuseppe Sculli; Marco Amelia	Football	Men's tournament	August 28

Medals by sport
Sport	1st place, gold medalist(s)	2nd place, silver medalist(s)	3rd place, bronze medalist(s)	Total
Fencing	3	3	1	7
Athletics	2	0	1	3
Shooting	1	2	0	3
Gymnastics	1	1	1	3
Archery	1	0	0	1
Cycling	1	0	0	1
Water polo	1	0	0	1
Canoeing	0	2	0	2
Swimming	0	1	1	2
Basketball	0	1	0	1
Volleyball	0	1	0	1
Rowing	0	0	3	1
Boxing	0	0	1	1
Football	0	0	1	1
Judo	0	0	1	1
Sailing	0	0	1	1
Total	10	11	11	32

== Archery ==
Three Italian archers qualified each for the men's and women's individual archery, and a spot each for both men's and women's teams. Marco Galiazzo earned the first archery gold medal in Italy's history. On his way to the final, he defeated countryman Ilario Di Buò in the round of 16. The three men did well enough in the ranking round to receive a bye in the first round of team competition, but were defeated by the United States in their first team match.

Athlete	Event	Ranking round		Round of 64	Round of 32	Round of 16	Quarterfinals	Semifinals	Final / BM	
Athlete	Event	Score	Seed	Opposition Score	Opposition Score	Opposition Score	Opposition Score	Opposition Score	Opposition Score	Rank
Ilario di Buò	Men's individual	659	19	Eriksson (SWE); W 151–146	van Alten (NED); W 164–160	Galiazzo (ITA); L 155–162	Did not advance			
Michele Frangilli	Men's individual	654	24	Lockoneco (INA); W 153–141	Yamamoto (JPN); L 154–162	Did not advance				
Marco Galiazzo	Men's individual	672	3	Taumoepeau (TGA); W 156–122	Serrano (MEX); W 164-163	di Buò (ITA); W 162–155	Wunderle (USA); W 109–108	Godfrey (GBR); W 110–108	Yamamoto (JPN); W 111–109	1st place, gold medalist(s)
Ilario di Buò; Michele Frangilli; Marco Galiazzo	Men's team	1985	3	—N/a		Bye	United States; L 240–243	Did not advance		
Natalia Valeeva	Women's individual	650	9	Figueroa (PHI); L 130–132	Did not advance					

== Athletics ==
Italian athletes have so far achieved qualifying standards in the following athletics events (up to a maximum of 3 athletes in each event at the 'A' Standard, and 1 at the 'B' Standard).

Key

- Note–Ranks given for track events are within the athlete's heat only
- Q = Qualified for the next round
- q = Qualified for the next round as a fastest loser or, in field events, by position without achieving the qualifying target
- NR = National record
- N/A = Round not applicable for the event
- Bye = Athlete not required to compete in round

Men
Track & road events

Athlete	Event	Heat		Quarterfinal		Semifinal		Final	
Athlete	Event	Result	Rank	Result	Rank	Result	Rank	Result	Rank
Stefano Baldini	Marathon	—N/a						2:10:55	1st place, gold medalist(s)
Ivano Brugnetti	20 km walk	—N/a						1:19:40	1st place, gold medalist(s)
Daniele Caimmi	Marathon	—N/a						2:23:07	52
Simone Collio	100 m	10.27	4 q	10.29	6	Did not advance			
Giovanni de Benedictis	50 km walk	—N/a						DSQ	
Alberico di Cecco	Marathon	—N/a						2:14:34	9
Alessandro Gandellini	20 km walk	—N/a						DNF	
Marco Giungi	20 km walk	—N/a						1:23:30	13
Andrew Howe	200 m	20.55	3 Q	21.17	8	Did not advance			
Andrea Longo	800 m	1:46.75	1 Q	—N/a		1:45.97	4	Did not advance	
Giuseppe Maffei	3000 m steeplechase	DNF		—N/a				Did not advance	
Marco Torrieri	200 m	20.68	3 Q	20.89	6	Did not advance			
Simone Collio; Maurizio Checcucci; Massimiliano Donati; Marco Torrieri	4 × 100 m relay	38.79	5	—N/a				Did not advance	

Field events

Athlete	Event	Qualification		Final	
Athlete	Event	Distance	Position	Distance	Position
Nicola Ciotti	High jump	2.25	=13	Did not advance	
Fabrizio Donato	Triple jump	16.45	21	Did not advance	
Giuseppe Gibilisco	Pole vault	5.70	=12 Q	5.85	3rd place, bronze medalist(s)
Alessandro Talotti	High jump	2.28	9 Q	2.25	12
Nicola Trentin	Long jump	7.86	19	Did not advance	
Nicola Vizzoni	Hammer throw	76.84	8 q	74.27	10

Combined events – Decathlon

Athlete	Event	100 m	LJ	SP	HJ	400 m	110H	DT	PV	JT	1500 m	Final	Rank
Paolo Casarsa	Result	11.36	6.68	14.92	1.94	53.20	15.39	48.66	4.40	58.62	4:56.12	7404	28
Paolo Casarsa	Points	782	739	785	749	673	803	843	731	717	582	7404	28

Women
Track & road events

Athlete	Event	Heat		Semifinal		Final	
Athlete	Event	Result	Rank	Result	Rank	Result	Rank
Benedetta Ceccarelli	400 m hurdles	56.28	5	Did not advance			
Rosaria Console	Marathon	—N/a				2:35:56	16
Bruna Genovese	Marathon	—N/a				2:32:50	10
Rossella Giordano	20 km walk	—N/a				1:30:39	11
Monika Niederstätter	400 m hurdles	55.57	4	Did not advance			
Elisabetta Perrone	20 km walk	—N/a				1:32:21	18
Elisa Rigaudo	20 km walk	—N/a				1:29:57	6

Field events

Athlete	Event	Qualification		Final	
Athlete	Event	Distance	Position	Distance	Position
Ester Balassini	Hammer throw	65.58	26	Did not advance	
Clarissa Claretti	Hammer throw	65.06	28	Did not advance	
Claudia Coslovich	Javelin throw	60.58	14	Did not advance	
Simona La Mantia	Triple jump	14.39	17	Did not advance	
Elisabetta Marin	Javelin throw	56.34	30	Did not advance	
Magdelín Martínez	Triple jump	14.57	10 Q	14.85	7
Fiona May	Long jump	6.38	28	Did not advance	

== Baseball ==
The Italian baseball team tied for 7th in the preliminary round and did not advance to the semifinals.

Roster

Manager: 30 – Giampiero Faraone

Coaches: 8 – Claudio Corradi, 12 – Manuel Cortina, 27 – Salvatore Varriale.

Pos.	No.	Player	Date of birth (age)	Bats	Throws	Club
IF	1	Igor Schiavetti	23 January 1976 (aged 28)			(Italy) Danesi Nettuno
OF	2	David Francia	16 April 1975 (aged 29)			(Italy) Prink Grosseto
OF	3	Jim Buccheri	12 November 1968 (aged 35)			(Italy) AS Rimini
IF	5	Giovanni Pantaleoni	16 March 1978 (aged 26)			(Italy) Italeri Bologna
C	6	Vincent Parisi	6 February 1978 (aged 26)			(Italy) T&A San Marino
C	9	Luca Bischeri	12 June 1979 (aged 25)			(Italy) La Gardenia Grosseto
IF	11	Seth La Fera	28 September 1975 (aged 28)			(Italy) Telemarket Rimini
P	15	William Lucena	1 October 1981 (aged 22)			(Italy) GB Ricambi Modena
P	16	Anthony Massimino	20 August 1979 (aged 24)			(Italy) Cus Parma
OF	21	Daniele Frignani	29 June 1977 (aged 27)			(Italy) Italieri Fortitudo Bologna
IF	22	Giuseppe Mazzanti	5 April 1983 (aged 21)			(Italy) Danesi Nettuno
P	23	Carlo Richetti	23 August 1983 (aged 20)			(Italy) Colavita Anzio
P	28	Fabio Milano	2 August 1977 (aged 27)			(Italy) Fortitudo Bologna
P	29	Kasey Olemberger	18 March 1978 (aged 26)			(Italy) Ceci E Negri Parma
OF	32	Francesco Casolari	4 October 1965 (aged 38)			(Italy) La Gardenia Grosseto
IF	34	Davide Dallospedale	12 September 1977 (aged 26)			(Italy) Italieri Fortitudo Bologna
P	36	Michael Marchesano	23 September 1975 (aged 28)			(Italy) Telemarket Rimini
P	37	Peter Nyari	4 September 1971 (aged 32)			(Italy) Cus Parma
P	40	David Rollandini	6 February 1979 (aged 25)			(Italy) BBC ORIOLES
IF	41	Jairo Ramos Gizzi	21 July 1971 (aged 33)			(Italy) Gardenia Grosseto
IF	42	Claudio Liverziani	4 March 1975 (aged 29)			(Italy) Italeri Fortitudo Bologna
P	43	Riccardo De Santis	4 January 1980 (aged 24)			(Italy) La Gardenia Grosseto
OF	45	Mario Chiarini	7 January 1981 (aged 23)			(Italy) Telemarket Rimini
C	72	Marcello Malagoli	14 July 1973 (aged 31)			(Italy) GB Ricambi Modena

Round robin

Team	W	L	Tiebreaker
Japan	6	1	1-0
Cuba	6	1	0-1
Canada	5	2	-
Australia	4	3	-
Chinese Taipei	3	4	-
Netherlands	2	5	-
Greece	1	6	1-0
Italy	1	6	0-1

Team	1	2	3	4	5	6	7	R	H	E
Japan	2	0	3	1	1	4	1	12	13	0
Italy	0	0	0	0	0	0	0	0	4	0
WP: Koji Uehara (1-0) LP: Anthony Massimino (0-1); Home runs: JPN: N. Nakamura in 3rd, 2 RBIs; K. Fukudome in 4th, 1 RBI; ITA: None

Team	1	2	3	4	5	6	7	8	9	R	H	E
Italy	1	0	0	1	0	0	0	0	1	3	9	4
Canada	2	7	1	1	0	0	5	0	x	9	6	0
WP: Jason Dickson (1-0) LP: David Rollandini (0-1); Home runs: ITA: None; CAN: P. L. Laforest in 2nd, 3 RBIs

Team	1	2	3	4	5	6	7	8	9	R	H	E
Australia	0	0	0	0	0	0	2	4	0	6	12	0
Italy	0	0	0	0	0	0	0	0	0	0	1	1
WP: Chris Oxspring (1-0) LP: Michael Marchesano (0-1)

Team	1	2	3	4	5	6	7	8	9	R	H	E
Italy	0	1	0	1	2	1	0	0	0	4	8	1
Netherlands	2	0	1	0	0	3	2	2	x	10	14	1
WP: Patrick de Lange (1-0) LP: Kaseygarret Olenberger (0-1); Home runs: ITA: J. Ramos Gizzi in 4th, 1 RBI; NED: S. Adriana in 3rd, 1 RBI

Team	1	2	3	4	5	6	7	8	9	R	H	E
Italy	0	0	1	1	0	1	0	0	2	5	7	0
Chinese Taipei	0	0	1	0	2	0	1	0	0	4	8	0
WP: Peter Nyari (1-0) LP: Yang Chien-Fu (0-1); Home runs: ITA: M. Chiarini in 4th, 1 RBI; J. Buccheri in 6th, 1 RBI; C. Liverziani in 9th, 2 RBIs; TPE: Peng C. M. in 7th, 1 RBI

Team	1	2	3	4	5	6	7	8	9	R	H	E
Greece	0	0	0	2	2	2	4	0	2	12	14	3
Italy	0	1	4	0	1	1	0	0	0	7	14	1
WP: Panagiotis Sikaras (1-0) LP: W. E. Lucena (0-1); Home runs: GRE: C. Bellinger in 6th, 1 RBI; N. Markakis in 7th, 3 RBIs; C. A. Harris in 9th, 1 RBI; ITA: J. Ramos Gizzi in 2nd, 1 RBI

Team	1	2	3	4	5	6	7	8	9	R	H	E
Cuba	0	3	1	0	0	0	0	1	0	5	11	0
Italy	0	0	0	0	0	0	0	0	0	0	2	1
WP: Luis Borroto (2-0) LP: Michael Marchesano (0-2)

== Basketball ==
=== Men's tournament ===
Roster

The following is the Italy roster in the men's basketball tournament of the 2004 Summer Olympics.

Italy men's national basketball team – 2004 Summer Olympics roster
Players
Coaches

Pos.	No.	Name	Age – Date of birth	Height	Club	Ctr.
F	4	Nikola Radulović	31 – 26 April 1973	2.07 m (6 ft 9 in)	Joventut Badalona	(Spain)
G	5	Gianluca Basile	29 – 24 January 1975	1.92 m (6 ft 4 in)	Skipper Bologna	(Italy)
F	6	Giacomo Galanda (C)	29 – 30 January 1975	2.10 m (6 ft 11 in)	Montepaschi Siena	(Italy)
G	7	Matteo Soragna	28 – 26 December 1975	1.97 m (6 ft 6 in)	Lauretana Biella	(Italy)
C	8	Denis Marconato	29 – 29 July 1975	2.11 m (6 ft 11 in)	Benetton Treviso	(Italy)
G	9	Gianmarco Pozzecco	31 – 15 September 1972	1.80 m (5 ft 11 in)	Skipper Bologna	(Italy)
G	10	Alex Righetti	26 – 14 August 1977	2.00 m (6 ft 7 in)	Lottomatica Roma	(Italy)
G	11	Rodolfo Rombaldoni	27 – 15 December 1976	1.93 m (6 ft 4 in)	Tris Reggio Calabria	(Italy)
G	12	Massimo Bulleri	26 – 10 September 1977	1.88 m (6 ft 2 in)	Benetton Treviso	(Italy)
G	13	Michele Mian	31 – 18 July 1973	1.93 m (6 ft 4 in)	Snaidero Udine	(Italy)
C	14	Roberto Chiacig	29 – 1 December 1974	2.10 m (6 ft 11 in)	Montepaschi Siena	(Italy)
C	15	Luca Garri	22 – 3 January 1982	2.04 m (6 ft 8 in)	Mabo Livorno	(Italy)

Head coach

- (Italy) Carlo Recalcati

Assistant coach(es)

- (Italy) Fabrizio Frates
- (Italy) Giovanni Piccin

Legend

- (C) Team captain
- nat field describes country
  of last club
  before the tournament
- Age as of August 13, 2004

Group play

Pos	Team	Pld	W	L	PF	PA	PD	Pts	Qualification
1	Spain	5	5	0	405	349	+56	10	Quarterfinals
2	Italy	5	3	2	371	341	+30	8 (Note: Head-to-head record: Italy 1–0 Argentina)	Quarterfinals
3	Argentina	5	3	2	414	396	+18	8	Quarterfinals
4	China	5	2	3	303	382	−79	7	Quarterfinals
5	New Zealand	5	1	4	399	413	−14	6 (Note: Head-to-head record: New Zealand 1–0 Serbia and Montenegro)	9th place playoff
6	Serbia and Montenegro	5	1	4	377	388	−11	6	11th place playoff

Source: FIBA archive
Rules for classification: 1) points; 2) head-to-head points; 3) head-to-head goal average; 4) head-to-head number of points scored.
Notes:

15 August 2004
11:15

Italy	71–69	New Zealand
Scoring by quarter: 25–13, 14–9, 17–24, 15–23
Pts: Basile 16; Rebs: Chiacig 9 Asts: Pozzecco 7		Pts: Penney 20; Rebs: Marks 9 Asts: Cameron 5

Helliniko Indoor Arena, Athens
Attendance: 1,100
Referees:
Reynaldo Sanchez (Dominican Republic)
Renato Santos (Brazil)

17 August 2004
16:45

Serbia and Montenegro	74–72	Italy
Scoring by quarter: 16–17, 20–19, 19–14, 19–22
Pts: Rakočević 19; Rebs: Tomašević 12; Asts: Tomašević 5		Pts: Bulleri 15; Rebs: Chiacig, Radulović 5 each Asts: Bulleri, Pozzecco 2 each

Helliniko Indoor Arena, Athens
Attendance: 12,500
Referees:
José Ronfini (Mexico)
Sean Corbin(United States)

19 August 2004
11:15

Italy	63–71	Spain
Scoring by quarter: 22–17, 11–18, 19–13, 11–23
Pts: Righetti 18; Rebs: Chiacig, Marconato 8 each Asts: Basile 3		Pts: Garbajosa 17; Rebs: Garbajosa 8 Asts: Garbajosa 3

Olympic Indoor Hall, Athens
Attendance: 8,950
Referees:
José Carrión (Puerto Rico)
Michael Aylen (Australia)

21 August 2004
16:45

China	52–89	Italy
Scoring by quarter: 11–22, 15–22, 13–16, 13–29
Pts: Li Nan, Yao Ming 9 each Rebs: Yi Jianlian 7 Asts: Yao Ming 2		Pts: Galanda 22; Rebs: Soragna 5 Asts: Pozzecco 12

Helliniko Indoor Arena, Athens
Attendance: 7,600
Referees:
Lazaros Voreadis (Greece)
Jorge Vazquez (Puerto Rico)

23 August 2004
20:00

Italy	76–75	Argentina
Scoring by quarter: 13–23, 22–13, 18–18, 23–21
Pts: Pozzecco 17; Rebs: Bulleri 6 Asts: Bulleri 4		Pts: Ginóbili, Scola 19 each Rebs: Wolkowyski 7 Asts: Ginóbili 3

Helliniko Indoor Arena, Athens
Attendance: 12,000
Referees: Lazaros Voreadis (GRE), Sean Corbin (USA)

Quarterfinal

26 August 2004
20:00

Italy	83–70	Puerto Rico
Scoring by quarter: 23–20, 18–15, 19–17, 23–18
Pts: Bulleri 20; Rebs: Marconato 12; Asts: Pozzecco 6		Pts: Ayuso 24; Rebs: Ortiz 8 Asts: Arroyo 5

Olympic Indoor Hall, Athens
Attendance: 14,500
Referees:
Vicente Bulto (Spain)
Alejandro Chiti (Argentina)

Semifinal

27 August 2004
22:15

Italy	100–91	Lithuania
Scoring by quarter: 20–26, 29–17, 24–20, 27–28
Pts: Basile 31; Rebs: Marconato 9 Asts: Marconato, Pozzecco 3 each		Pts: Macijauskas 26; Rebs: Šiškauskas 7 Asts: Jasikevičius 9

Olympic Indoor Hall, Athens
Attendance: 14,500
Referees:
Reynaldo Sanchez (Dominican Republic)
José Carrión (Puerto Rico)

Gold medal game

28 August 2004
22:45

Italy	69–84	Argentina
Scoring by quarter: 16–23, 25–20, 13–17, 15–24
Pts: Pozzecco, Soragna 12 each Rebs: Garri 6 Asts: Rombaldoni 2		Pts: Scola 25; Rebs: Scola 11; Asts: Ginóbili 6

Olympic Indoor Hall, Athens
Attendance: 14,500
Referees: Renato Santos (BRA), Lazaros Voreadis (GRE)

Won silver medal

== Boxing ==
Italy sent six boxers to Athens, winning a bronze medal to join a five-way tie for 16th place in the boxing medals count. Both boxers that had matches in the round of 32 won those bouts, (two more had byes). Four boxers won in the round of 16 to advance to quarterfinals, while two fell in that round. Only the super heavyweight Roberto Cammarelle survived the quarterfinal round, not falling until the semifinals to win the bronze medal. The combined record of the Italian boxers was 7-6.

Athlete	Event	Round of 32	Round of 16	Quarterfinals	Semifinals	Final	
Athlete	Event	Opposition Result	Opposition Result	Opposition Result	Opposition Result	Opposition Result	Rank
Alfonso Pinto	Light flyweight	Okon (NGR); W RSC	Tamara (COL); W 49–35	Yalçınkaya (TUR); L 24–33	Did not advance		
Domenico Valentino	Lightweight	Bye	Asheri (IRI); W 37–18	Yeleuov (KAZ); L 23–29	Did not advance		
Michele di Rocco	Light welterweight	López (VEN); W 37–30	Nourian (AUS); W 33–25	Gheorghe (ROM); L 18–29	Did not advance		
Clemente Russo	Light heavyweight	Bye	Ward (USA); L 9–17	Did not advance			
Daniel Betti	Heavyweight	—N/a	Zuyev (BLR); L RSC	Did not advance			
Roberto Cammarelle	Super heavyweight	—N/a	Oloukun (NGR); W 29–13	Masikin (UKR); W 23–21	Povetkin (RUS); L 19–31	Did not advance	3rd place, bronze medalist(s)

== Canoeing ==
=== Slalom ===
Athlete	Event	Preliminary						Semifinal		Final			
Athlete	Event	Run 1	Rank	Run 2	Rank	Total	Rank	Time	Rank	Time	Rank	Total	Rank
Pierpaolo Ferrazzi	Men's K-1	99.70	17	102.23	22	201.93	19 Q	103.07	19	Did not advance			
Andrea Benetti; Erik Masoero	Men's C-2	116.32	11	121.83	10	238.15	10 Q	106.40	5 Q	113.66	6	220.06	6
Cristina Giai Pron	Women's K-1	116.18	10	114.59	12	230.77	13 Q	109.27	6 Q	120.09	8	229.36	8

=== Sprint ===
Athlete	Event	Heats		Semifinals		Final	
Athlete	Event	Time	Rank	Time	Rank	Time	Rank
Andrea Facchin	Men's K-1 500 m	1:40.025	4 q	1:40.387	3 Q	1:41.575	9
Andrea Facchin	Men's K-1 1000 m	3:36.492	5 q	3:39.510	8	Did not advance	
Beniamino Bonomi; Antonio Rossi	Men's K-2 500 m	1:33.565	5 q	1:31.830	3 Q	1:30.804	8
Beniamino Bonomi; Antonio Rossi	Men's K-2 1000 m	3:14.060	6 q	3:12.597	2 Q	3:19.484	2nd place, silver medalist(s)
Josefa Idem	Women's K-1 500 m	1:50.466	2 q	1:50.844	1 Q	1:49.729	2nd place, silver medalist(s)

== Cycling ==
=== Road ===
Men

Athlete	Event	Time	Rank
Paolo Bettini	Road race	5:41:44	1st place, gold medalist(s)
Cristian Moreni	Road race	5:44:13	46
Daniele Nardello	Road race	5:42:03	38
Luca Paolini	Road race	5:42:03	39
Filippo Pozzato	Road race	5:50:35	67
Filippo Pozzato	Time trial	Did not start	

Women

Athlete	Event	Time	Rank
Giorgia Bronzini	Road race	3:28:39	37
Noemi Cantele	Road race	3:25:42	13
Tatiana Guderzo	Road race	3:25:42	26
Tatiana Guderzo	Time trial	34:14.47	21

=== Track ===
Omnium

Athlete	Event	Points	Laps	Rank
Angelo Ciccone	Men's points race	49	2	8
Vera Carrara	Women's points race	8	0	5

=== Mountain biking ===
Athlete	Event	Time	Rank
Marco Bui	Men's cross-country	2:20:45	10
Yader Zoli	Men's cross-country	2:31:39	35
Paola Pezzo	Women's cross-country	Did not finish	

== Diving ==
Italian divers qualified for eight individual spots at the 2004 Olympic Games.

Men

Athlete	Event	Preliminaries		Semifinals		Final	
Athlete	Event	Points	Rank	Points	Rank	Points	Rank
Nicola Marconi	3 m springboard	384.63	20	Did not advance			
Tommaso Marconi	3 m springboard	378.72	24	Did not advance			
Francesco Dell'Uomo	10 m platform	426.12	14 Q	610.41	12 Q	628.77	9
Massimiliano Mazzucchi	10 m platform	405.18	20	Did not advance			

Women

Athlete	Event	Preliminaries		Semifinals		Final	
Athlete	Event	Points	Rank	Points	Rank	Points	Rank
Tania Cagnotto	3 m springboard	298.77	10 Q	529.92	9 Q	550.38	8
Valentina Marocchi	3 m springboard	243.45	23	Did not advance			
Tania Cagnotto	10 m platform	339.15	8 Q	256.44	7 Q	518.67	8
Valentina Marocchi	10 m platform	221.85	32	Did not advance			

== Equestrian ==
=== Eventing ===
Athlete	Horse	Event	Dressage		Cross-country			Jumping						Total	
Athlete	Horse	Event	Dressage		Cross-country			Qualifier			Final			Total	
Athlete	Horse	Event	Penalties	Rank	Penalties	Total	Rank	Penalties	Total	Rank	Penalties	Total	Rank	Penalties	Rank
Susanna Bordone	Ava	Individual	62.80	49	47.20 #	110.00 #	60	15.00 #	125.00 #	56	Did not advance			125.00	56
Stefano Brecciaroli	Cappa Hill	Individual	66.80	=61	13.20	80.00	44	0.00	80.00	35	Did not advance			80.00	35
Fabio Magni	Vent d'Arade	Individual	64.40	56	24.40	88.80	54	12.00	100.80	48	Did not advance			100.80	48
Giovanni Menchi	Hunefer	Individual	72.40 #	69	4.00	76.40	41	0.00	76.40	31 Q	12.00	88.40	24	88.40	24
Susanna Bordone; Stefano Brecciaroli; Fabio Magni; Giovanni Menchi	See above	Team	194.00	13	41.60	245.20	10	12.00	257.20	=4	—N/a			257.20	10

"#" indicates that the score of this rider does not count in the team competition, since only the best three results of a team are counted.

=== Show jumping ===
Athlete	Horse	Event	Qualification								Final					Total	
Athlete	Horse	Event	Round 1		Round 2			Round 3			Round A		Round B			Total	
Athlete	Horse	Event	Penalties	Rank	Penalties	Total	Rank	Penalties	Total	Rank	Penalties	Rank	Penalties	Total	Rank	Penalties	Rank
Roberto Arioldi	Dime de la Cour	Individual	17	71	10	27	=59 Q	21	48	56	Did not advance						
Bruno Chimirri	Landknecht	Individual	5	=31	8	13	=33 Q	5	18	27 Q	6	11 Q	17	23	21	23	21
Vincenzo Chimirri	Delfi Platiere	Individual	8	=47	12	20	=46 Q	12	32	=46 Q	8	=12 Q	Eliminated				
Juan Carlos García	Albin III	Individual	0	=1	1	1	=2 Q	8	9	9 Q	8	=12 Q	12	20	=16	20	=16
Roberto Arioldi; Bruno Chimirri; Vincenzo Chimirri; Juan Carlos García	See above	Team	—N/a								19	8 Q	25	44	7	44	7

== Fencing ==
Twelve Italian fencers (seven men and five women) qualified for the following events:

Men

Athlete	Event	Round of 64	Round of 32	Round of 16	Quarterfinal	Semifinal	Final / BM	
Athlete	Event	Opposition Score	Opposition Score	Opposition Score	Opposition Score	Opposition Score	Opposition Score	Rank
Alfredo Rota	Individual épée	Bye	Nyisztor (ROM); W 15–8	Thompson (USA); L 13–15	Did not advance			
Andrea Cassarà	Individual foil	Bye	Tiomkin (USA); W 15–3	Park H-K (KOR); W 15–13	Kruse (GBR); W 15–8	Guyart (FRA); L 14–15	Ganeyev (RUS); W 15–12	3rd place, bronze medalist(s)
Salvatore Sanzo	Individual foil	Bye	Rodríguez (VEN); W 15–7	Ha C-D (KOR); W 15–6	Wu Hx (CHN); W 15–10	Ganeyev (RUS); W 15–12	Guyart (FRA); L 13–15	2nd place, silver medalist(s)
Simone Vanni	Individual foil	Bye	McGuire (CAN); W 15–12	Le Péchoux (FRA); W 15–8	Ganeyev (RUS); L 14–15	Did not advance		
Andrea Cassarà; Salvatore Sanzo; Simone Vanni	Team foil	—N/a			Egypt; W 45–20	Russia; W 45–27	China; W 45–42	1st place, gold medalist(s)
Aldo Montano	Individual sabre	Bye	Manetas (GRE); W 15–12	Smart (USA); W 15–7	Sharikov (RUS); W 15–13	Lapkes (BLR); W 15–6	Nemcsik (HUN); W 15–14	1st place, gold medalist(s)
Giampiero Pastore	Individual sabre	Bye	Lee (USA); L 9–15	Did not advance				
Luigi Tarantino	Individual sabre	Bye	Rogers (USA); W 15–3	Tretiak (UKR); L 8–15	Did not advance			
Aldo Montano; Giampiero Pastore; Luigi Tarantino	Team sabre	—N/a			Ukraine; W 45–44	Russia; W 45–42	France; L 42–45	2nd place, silver medalist(s)

Women

Athlete	Event	Round of 64	Round of 32	Round of 16	Quarterfinal	Semifinal	Final / BM	
Athlete	Event	Opposition Score	Opposition Score	Opposition Score	Opposition Score	Opposition Score	Opposition Score	Rank
Cristiana Cascioli	Individual épée	Bye	Harada (JPN); W 15–14	Nagy (HUN); L 13–15	Did not advance			
Margherita Granbassi	Individual foil	—N/a	Bye	Wuillème (FRA); L 9–15	Did not advance			
Giovanna Trillini	Individual foil	—N/a	Bye	Sugawara (JPN); W 15–2	Varga (HUN); W 15–11	Mohamed (HUN); W 15–7	Vezzali (ITA); L 11–15	2nd place, silver medalist(s)
Valentina Vezzali	Individual foil	—N/a	Bye	González (VEN); W 15–4	Wuillème (FRA); W 15–8	Gruchała (POL); W 15–13	Trillini (ITA); W 15–11	1st place, gold medalist(s)
Gioia Marzocca	Individual sabre	—N/a	Bye	Jemayeva (AZE); L 6–15	Did not advance			

== Football ==
=== Men's tournament ===
Roster

The following is the Italian squad in the men's football tournament of the 2004 Summer Olympics.

Head coach: Claudio Gentile

No.	Pos.	Player	Date of birth (age)	Caps	Goals	2004 club
1	GK	Marco Amelia	2 April 1982 (aged 22)	20	0	(Italian Football Federation) Livorno
2	DF	Giorgio Chiellini	14 August 1984 (aged 19)	7	1	(Italian Football Federation) Livorno
3	DF	Emiliano Moretti	11 June 1981 (aged 23)	21	0	(Italian Football Federation) Parma
4	DF	Matteo Ferrari*	5 December 1979 (aged 24)	60	0	(Italian Football Federation) Parma
5	DF	Daniele Bonera	31 May 1981 (aged 23)	32	0	(Italian Football Federation) Parma
6	MF	Daniele De Rossi	24 July 1983 (aged 21)	12	2	(Italian Football Federation) Roma
7	MF	Giampiero Pinzi	11 March 1981 (aged 23)	30	2	(Italian Football Federation) Udinese
8	MF	Angelo Palombo	25 September 1981 (aged 22)	17	0	(Italian Football Federation) Sampdoria
9	FW	Alberto Gilardino	5 July 1982 (aged 22)	37	15	(Italian Football Federation) Parma
10	MF	Andrea Pirlo*	19 May 1979 (aged 25)	59	17	(Italian Football Federation) AC Milan
11	FW	Giuseppe Sculli	23 March 1981 (aged 23)	20	9	(Italian Football Federation) Juventus
12	MF	Andrea Gasbarroni	6 August 1981 (aged 23)	10	2	(Italian Football Federation) Juventus
13	DF	Andrea Barzagli	8 May 1981 (aged 23)	11	0	(Italian Football Federation) Palermo
14	DF	Cesare Bovo	14 January 1983 (aged 21)	9	1	(Italian Football Federation) Roma
15	MF	Marco Donadel	21 April 1983 (aged 21)	9	0	(Italian Football Federation) AC Milan
16	FW	Simone Del Nero	4 August 1981 (aged 23)	8	0	(Italian Football Federation) Brescia
17	DF	Giandomenico Mesto	25 May 1982 (aged 22)	7	0	(Italian Football Federation) Reggina
18	GK	Ivan Pelizzoli	18 November 1980 (aged 23)	19	0	(Italian Football Federation) Roma

* Over-aged player.

Group play

Pos	Team	Pld	W	D	L	GF	GA	GD	Pts	Qualification
1	Paraguay	3	2	0	1	6	5	+1	6	Qualified for the quarterfinals
2	Italy	3	1	1	1	5	5	0	4	Qualified for the quarterfinals
3	Ghana	3	1	1	1	4	4	0	4	
4	Japan	3	1	0	2	6	7	−1	3	

12 August 2004
20:30

Ghana	2 – 2	Italy
Pappoe 36'; Appiah 45+1'	Report	Pinzi 49'; Gilardino 83'

Panthessaliko Stadium, Volos
Attendance: 7,012
Referee: Horacio Elizondo (Argentina)

15 August 2004
20:30

Japan	2 – 3	Italy
Abe 21'; Takamatsu 90+1'	Report	De Rossi 3'; Gilardino 8', 36'

Panthessaliko Stadium, Volos
Attendance: 9,487
Referee: Jorge Larrionda (Uruguay)

18 August 2004
20:30

Paraguay	1 – 0	Italy
Bareiro 14'	Report

Karaiskaki Stadium, Piraeus
Attendance: 24,160
Referee: Claus Bo Larsen (Denmark)

Quarterfinal

21 August 2004
18:00

Mali	0 – 1 (a.e.t.)	Italy
	Report	Bovo 116'

Karaiskaki Stadium, Piraeus
Attendance: 27,543
Referee: Carlos Torres (Paraguay)

Semifinal

24 August 2004
18:00

Italy	0 – 3	Argentina
	Report	Tevez 16'; Lucho 69'; M. González 84'

Karaiskaki Stadium, Piraeus
Attendance: 30,910
Referee: Benito Archundia (Mexico)

Bronze Medal Final

27 August 2004
20:30

Italy	1 – 0	Iraq
Gilardino 8'	Report

Kaftanzoglio Stadium, Thessaloniki
Attendance: 5,203
Referee: Jorge Larrionda (Uruguay)

Won bronze medal

== Gymnastics ==
=== Artistic ===
Men
Team

Athlete	Event	Qualification								Final							
Athlete	Event	Apparatus						Total	Rank	Apparatus						Total	Rank
Athlete	Event	F	PH	R	V	PB	HB	Total	Rank	F	PH	R	V	PB	HB	Total	Rank
Matteo Angioletti	Team	8.812	—N/a	9.675	9.662	—N/a	8.212	—N/a		Did not advance							
Alberto Busnari	Team	8.812	9.637	—N/a	8.762	8.987	9.337	—N/a		Did not advance							
Igor Cassina	Team	8.650	9.600	9.162	8.987	8.675	9.775 Q	54.849	34	Did not advance							
Jury Chechi	Team	—N/a	9.150	9.762 Q	—N/a	9.587	—N/a			Did not advance							
Matteo Morandi	Team	8.962	8.750	9.775 Q	9.412	8.375	8.700	53.974	41	Did not advance							
Enrico Pozzo	Team	9.450	8.737	7.850	9.325	9.100	8.300	52.812	44	Did not advance							
Total	Team	36.036	37.174	38.374	37.386	36.349	36.112	221.431	12	Did not advance							

Individual finals

Athlete	Event	Apparatus						Total	Rank
Athlete	Event	F	PH	R	V	PB	HB	Total	Rank
Igor Cassina	Horizontal bar	—N/a					9.812	9.812	1st place, gold medalist(s)
Jury Chechi	Rings	—N/a		9.812	—N/a			9.812	3rd place, bronze medalist(s)
Matteo Morandi	Rings	—N/a		9.800	—N/a			9.800	=5

Women

Athlete	Event	Qualification						Final					
Athlete	Event	Apparatus				Total	Rank	Apparatus				Total	Rank
Athlete	Event	V	UB	BB	F	Total	Rank	V	UB	BB	F	Total	Rank
Monica Bergamelli	All-around	9.300	8.250	8.862	8.300	34.712	54	Did not advance					
Maria Teresa Gargano	All-around	9.100	8.287	8.612	9.325	35.324	48	Did not advance					

=== Rhythmic ===
Athlete	Event	Qualification						Final					
Athlete	Event	Hoop	Ball	Clubs	Ribbon	Total	Rank	Hoop	Ball	Clubs	Ribbon	Total	Rank
Laura Zacchilli	Individual	23.925	24.225	23.250	22.700	94.100	13	Did not advance					

Athlete	Event	Qualification				Final			
Athlete	Event	5 ribbons	3 hoops 2 balls	Total	Rank	5 ribbons	3 hoops 2 balls	Total	Rank
Elisa Blanchi; Fabrizia D'Ottavio; Marinella Falca; Daniela Masseroni; Elisa Santoni; Laura Vernizzi	Team	22.850	25.325	48.175	2 Q	24.150	25.300	49.450	2nd place, silver medalist(s)

=== Trampoline ===
Athlete	Event	Qualification		Final	
Athlete	Event	Score	Rank	Score	Rank
Flavio Cannone	Men's	57.60	13	Did not advance	

== Judo ==
Nine Italian judoka (four men and five women) qualified for the following events.

Men

Athlete	Event	Round of 32	Round of 16	Quarterfinals	Semifinals	Repechage 1	Repechage 2	Repechage 3	Final / BM	
Athlete	Event	Opposition Result	Opposition Result	Opposition Result	Opposition Result	Opposition Result	Opposition Result	Opposition Result	Opposition Result	Rank
Roberto Meloni	−81 kg	Delgado (POR); W 0010–0002	Nossov (RUS); L 0001–0011	Did not advance		Tomouchi (JPN); W 0102–0001	Canto (BRA); L 0001–0200	Did not advance		
Francesco Lepre	−90 kg	Zviadauri (GEO); L 0000–1000	Did not advance			Taov (RUS); L 0000–1001	Did not advance			
Michele Monti	−100 kg	Gill (CAN); W 1003–0001	Ze'evi (ISR); L 0111–1011	Did not advance						
Paolo Bianchessi	+100 kg	Kim S-B (KOR); W 0200–0000	Polyanskyi (UKR); W 0201–0000	van der Geest (NED); W 0001–0000	Suzuki (JPN); L 0001–1010	Bye			Pertelson (EST); L 0000–1000	5

Women

Athlete	Event	Round of 32	Round of 16	Quarterfinals	Semifinals	Repechage 1	Repechage 2	Repechage 3	Final / BM	
Athlete	Event	Opposition Result	Opposition Result	Opposition Result	Opposition Result	Opposition Result	Opposition Result	Opposition Result	Opposition Result	Rank
Giuseppina Macrì	−48 kg	Bye	Gao F (CHN); L 0000–1011	Did not advance						
Cinzia Cavazzuti	−57 kg	Gravenstijn (NED); L 0001–1000	Did not advance			Wilson (USA); W 0011–0001	Zangrando (BRA); W 0010–0001	Fernández (ESP); L 0001–0010	Did not advance	
Ylenia Scapin	−63 kg	Hong O-S (PRK); L 0000–0001	Did not advance							
Lucia Morico	−78 kg	Bye	Cotton (CAN); W 1010–0000	Anno (JPN); L 0001–0101	Did not advance	Bye	Pinto (VEN); W 1001–0000	Silva (BRA); W 0120–0011	Matrosova (UKR); W 1000–0000	3rd place, bronze medalist(s)
Barbara Andolina	+78 kg	Bye	Zambotti (MEX); W 1021–0000	Donguzashvili (RUS); L 0001–1010	Did not advance	Bye	Choi S-I (KOR); L 0001–0120	Did not advance		

== Modern pentathlon ==
Four Italian athletes qualified to compete in the modern pentathlon event through the 2003 UIPM World Championships

Athlete	Event	Shooting (10 m air pistol)			Fencing (épée one touch)			Swimming (200 m freestyle)			Riding (show jumping)			Running (3000 m)			Total points	Final rank
Athlete	Event	Points	Rank	MP Points	Results	Rank	MP points	Time	Rank	MP points	Penalties	Rank	MP points	Time	Rank	MP Points	Total points	Final rank
Enrico Dell'Amore	Men's	180	12	1096	18–13	=6	888	2:16.63	31	1164	440	30	760	9:55.01	12	1020	4928	26
Andrea Valentini	Men's	169	27	964	19–12	=2	916	2:18.34	32	1140	132	16	1068	10:01.25	16	996	5084	19
Claudia Corsini	Women's	169	21	964	21–10	=2	972	2:20.56	11	1236	84	13	1116	11:11.65	12	1036	5324	4
Federica Foghetti	Women's	167	24	940	15–16	=16	804	2:25.81	17	1172	892	DNF	308	11:19.11	17	1004	4228	32

== Rowing ==
Italian rowers qualified the following boats:

Men

Athlete	Event	Heats		Repechage		Semifinals		Final	
Athlete	Event	Time	Rank	Time	Rank	Time	Rank	Time	Rank
Matteo Stefanini	Single sculls	7:31.54	3 R	7:08.91	4 SD/E	7:10.34	2 FD	6:57.16	19
Giuseppe de Vita; Dario Lari	Pair	7:03.12	3 SA/B	Bye		6:31.26	5 FB	6:22.08	8
Rossano Galtarossa; Alessio Sartori	Double sculls	6:40.82	1 SA/B	Bye		6:11.49	1 FA	6:32.93	3rd place, bronze medalist(s)
Elia Luini; Leonardo Pettinari	Lightweight double sculls	6:19.82	2 R	6:21.22	2 SA/B	6:23.72	5 FB	7:01.86	12
Luca Agamennoni; Dario Dentale; Raffaello Leonardo; Lorenzo Porzio	Four	6:22.58	2 SA/B	Bye		5:52.12	3 FA	6:10.41	3rd place, bronze medalist(s)
Alessandro Corona; Federico Gattinoni; Simone Raineri; Simone Venier	Quadruple sculls	5:45.85	3 SA/B	Bye		5:47.38	5 FB	6:06.91	10
Catello Amarante; Salvatore Amitrano; Lorenzo Bertini; Bruno Mascarenhas	Lightweight four	5:52.17	2 SA/B	Bye		5:55.02	1 FA	5:48.87	3rd place, bronze medalist(s)
Sergio Canciani; Pierpaolo Frattini; Luca Ghezzi; Gaetano Iannuzzi (cox); Niccolò Mornati; Carlo Mornati; Marco Penna; Valerio Pinton; Aldo Tramontano	Eight	5:30.16	3 R	5:34.56	3 FB	—N/a		5:49.43	7

Women

Athlete	Event	Heats		Repechage		Semifinals		Final	
Athlete	Event	Time	Rank	Time	Rank	Time	Rank	Time	Rank
Gabriella Bascelli; Elisabetta Sancassani	Double sculls	7:46.66	5 R	7:01.63	3 FB	—N/a		6:54.51	8

Qualification Legend: FA=Final A (medal); FB=Final B (non-medal); FC=Final C (non-medal); FD=Final D (non-medal); FE=Final E (non-medal); FF=Final F (non-medal); SA/B=Semifinals A/B; SC/D=Semifinals C/D; SE/F=Semifinals E/F; R=Repechage

== Sailing ==
Italian sailors have qualified one boat for each of the following events.

Men

Athlete	Event	Race											Net points	Final rank
Athlete	Event	1	2	3	4	5	6	7	8	9	10	M*	Net points	Final rank
Riccardo Giordano	Mistral	13	8	29	22	19	21	20	~~OCS~~	32	DNF	DNS	234	26
Michele Marchesini	Finn	21	20	20	24	24	24	6	~~25~~	23	15	24	201	24
Andrea Trani; Gabrio Zandonà	470	21	~~23~~	7	12	11	22	13	5	7	8	3	109	10
Francesco Bruni; Guido Vignar	Star	13	5	9	4	~~16~~	12	3	8	2	5	14	75	7

Women

Athlete	Event	Race											Net points	Final rank
Athlete	Event	1	2	3	4	5	6	7	8	9	10	M*	Net points	Final rank
Alessandra Sensini	Mistral	~~7~~	1	6	3	1	2	3	6	3	2	7	34	3rd place, bronze medalist(s)
Larissa Nevierov	Europe	~~23~~	10	6	4	17	19	17	18	17	18	18	144	16
Myriam Cutolo; Elisabetta Saccheggiani	470	16	19	18	~~20~~	10	19	20	4	17	8	10	141	20
Angela Baroni; Giulia Conti; Alessandra Marenzi	Yngling	~~16~~	12	7	7	13	15	6	11	14	14	7	106	14

Open

Athlete	Event	Race																Net points	Final rank
Athlete	Event	1	2	3	4	5	6	7	8	9	10	11	12	13	14	15	M*	Net points	Final rank
Diego Negri	Laser	20	12	19	1	~~OCS~~	21	15	13	15	21	—N/a					2	139	13
Gianfranco Sibello; Piero Sibello	49er	~~DSQ~~	1	4	12	11	~~17~~	4	9	14	15	16	5	9	17	5	16	138	14
Edoardo Bianchi; Francesco Marcolini	Tornado	~~DNF~~	6	3	7	11	16	10	2	8	9	—N/a					6	78	10

M = Medal race; OCS = On course side of the starting line; DSQ = Disqualified; DNF = Did not finish; DNS= Did not start; RDG = Redress given

== Shooting ==
Men

Athlete	Event	Qualification		Final	
Athlete	Event	Points	Rank	Points	Rank
Andrea Benelli	Skeet	124	2 Q	149 (5)	1st place, gold medalist(s)
Francesco Bruno	10 m air pistol	578	=17	Did not advance	
Francesco Bruno	50 m pistol	556	=12	Did not advance	
Marco de Nicolo	10 m air rifle	590	=24	Did not advance	
Marco de Nicolo	50 m rifle prone	595	8 Q	699.7	5
Marco de Nicolo	50 m rifle 3 positions	1148	=31	Did not advance	
Daniele di Spigno	Double trap	134 (11)	7	Did not advance	
Vigilio Fait	10 m air pistol	576	=23	Did not advance	
Vigilio Fait	50 m pistol	556	=12	Did not advance	
Ennio Falco	Skeet	119	=21	Did not advance	
Marco Innocenti	Double trap	127	=17	Did not advance	
Giovanni Pellielo	Trap	122	3 Q	146	2nd place, silver medalist(s)
Marco Venturini	Trap	112	=27	Did not advance	

Women

Athlete	Event	Qualification		Final	
Athlete	Event	Points	Rank	Points	Rank
Chiara Cainero	Skeet	67	=8	Did not advance	
Roberta Pelosi	Trap	58	=9	Did not advance	
Sabrina Sena	10 m air rifle	390	32	Did not advance	
Valentina Turisini	10 m air rifle	395	=12	Did not advance	
Valentina Turisini	50 m rifle 3 positions	585	3 Q	685.9	2nd place, silver medalist(s)

== Softball ==
Team Roster

Italy
Position	No.	Player	Birth	Club in 2004
C	1	Ilaria Pino	FEB/18/1983	Rhea Vendors Caronno
C	2	Eva Trevisan	APR/21/1980	Fiorini Forli
IF	3	Sabrina Del Mastio	MAR/10/1971	Fiorini Forli
IF	4	Stefania Vitaliani	JUL/16/1975	Fiorini Forli
OF	7	Natalia Cimin	JUL/31/1979	Caserta
IF	8	Jennifer Spediacci	APR/05/1978	Fiorini Forli
IF	12	Marta Gambella	JUN/07/1974	Mosca Macerata
P	13	Nicole Di Salvio	NOV/23/1979	Bussolengo
P	15	Daniela Castellani	JUN/30/1975	Avesani Bussolengo
P	16	Leslie Malerich	FEB/29/1980
P	17	Susan Bugliarello	OCT/18/1975
IF	22	Natalie Anter	APR/26/1980	Fiorini Forli
OF	23	Francesca Francolini	DEC/27/1979	Mosca Macerata
P	24	Annalisa Turci	SEP/26/1976	Fiorini Forli
OF	31	Samanta Bardini	FEB/27/1977	Caggiati Langhirano
Bench Coaches
Team; Manager		Barry Blanchard	MAR/22/1935
Coach		Monica Corvino	AUG/17/1963
Coach		Giacomo Livi	AUG/17/1954
Coach		Marina Centrone	APR/22/1960

Preliminary Round

Team	Pld	W	L	RF	RA	Pct
United States	7	7	0	41	0	1.000
Australia	7	6	1	22	14	0.857
Japan	7	4	3	17	8	0.571
China	7	3	4	15	20	0.429
Canada	7	3	4	6	14	0.429
Chinese Taipei	7	2	5	3	13	0.286
Greece	7	2	5	6	24	0.286
Italy	7	1	6	8	24	0.143

Team	1	2	3	4	5	6	7	R	H	E
Italy	0	0	0	0	0	-	-	0	3	2
United States	1	3	0	0	3	-	-	7	11	0
WP: Jennie Finch (1-0) LP: Leslie Malerich (0-1)

Team	1	2	3	4	5	6	7	R	H	E
Italy	0	6	0	0	0	0	1	7	9	3
China	0	0	0	0	5	0	0	5	5	1
WP: Jennifer Spediacci (1-0) LP: Li Qi (0-1)

Team	1	2	3	4	5	6	7	R	H	E
Italy	0	0	0	0	1	0	0	1	6	0
Greece	2	0	0	0	0	0	X	2	5	3
WP: Sarah Farnworth (2-1) LP: Susan Bugliarello (0-1)

Team	1	2	3	4	5	6	7	R	H	E
Australia	2	2	2	0	2	-	-	8	10	1
Italy	0	0	0	0	0	-	-	0	2	1
WP: Melanie Roche (1-0) LP: Jennifer Spediacci (1-1); Home runs: AUS: Stacey Porter, Natalie Titcume; ITA: None

Team	1	2	3	4	5	6	7	R	H	E
Italy	0	0	0	0	0	0	0	0	5	1
Chinese Taipei	0	0	0	1	0	0	X	1	4	0
WP: Lin Su-Hua (1-1) LP: Susan Bugliarello (0-2)

Team	1	2	3	4	5	6	7	R	H	E
Italy	0	0	0	0	0	0	0	0	3	0
Japan	0	0	1	0	0	0	X	1	8	1
WP: Yukiko Ueno (1-2) LP: Jennifer Spediacci (1-2)

Team	1	2	3	4	5	6	7	R	H	E
Italy	0	0	0	0	0	0	0	0	2	0
Canada	0	0	0	1	0	0	X	1	1	1
WP: Lauren Bay (3-2) LP: Susan Bugliarello (0-3)

== Swimming ==
Italian swimmers earned qualifying standards in the following events (up to a maximum of 2 swimmers in each event at the A-standard time, and 1 at the B-standard time):

Men

Athlete	Event	Heat		Semifinal		Final	
Athlete	Event	Time	Rank	Time	Rank	Time	Rank
Andrea Beccari	200 m freestyle	1:54.00	46	Did not advance			
Alessio Boggiatto	200 m individual medley	2:01.30	6 Q	2:01.27	10	Did not advance	
Alessio Boggiatto	400 m individual medley	4:15.78	3 Q	—N/a		4:12.28 NR	4
Paolo Bossini	200 m breaststroke	2:12.09	3 Q	2:11.76	4 Q	2:11.20	4
Emiliano Brembilla	200 m freestyle	1:47.95	3 Q	1:47.93	7 Q	1:48.40	8
Emiliano Brembilla	400 m freestyle	3:50.55	11	—N/a		Did not advance	
Loris Facci	200 m breaststroke	2:19.38	40	Did not advance			
Filippo Magnini	100 m freestyle	49.58	11 Q	48.91 NR	3 Q	48.99	5
Luca Marin	400 m individual medley	4:16.85	10	—N/a		Did not advance	
Emanuele Merisi	200 m backstroke	2:00.10	9 Q	2:00.83	16	Did not advance	
Christian Minotti	1500 m freestyle	15:39.31	24	—N/a		Did not advance	
Mattia Nalesso	100 m butterfly	53.49	23	Did not advance			
Massimiliano Rosolino	400 m freestyle	3:47.72	4 Q	—N/a		3:46.25	5
Massimiliano Rosolino	200 m individual medley	2:01.56	11 Q	2:01.29	11	Did not advance	
Michele Scarica	50 m freestyle	22.80	25	Did not advance			
Lorenzo Vismara	50 m freestyle	22.70	22	Did not advance			
Lorenzo Vismara	100 m freestyle	50.03	25	Did not advance			
Alessandro Calvi*; Christian Galenda; Filippo Magnini; Lorenzo Vismara; Michele Scarica	4 × 100 m freestyle relay	3:16.18	3 Q	—N/a		3:15.75	4
Emiliano Brembilla; Federico Cappellazzo*; Simone Cercato; Filippo Magnini; Matteo Pelliciari*; Massimiliano Rosolino	4 × 200 m freestyle relay	7:18.26	6 Q	—N/a		7:11.83 NR	3rd place, bronze medalist(s)
Paolo Bossini; Emanuele Merisi; Mattia Nalesso; Giacomo Vassanelli	4 × 100 m medley relay	DSQ		—N/a		Did not advance	

* Competed only in heats and received medals

Women

Athlete	Event	Heat		Semifinal		Final	
Athlete	Event	Time	Rank	Time	Rank	Time	Rank
Chiara Boggiatto	100 m breaststroke	1:10.33	16 Q	1:10.84	16	Did not advance	
Chiara Boggiatto	200 m breaststroke	2:30.32	12 Q	2:30.76	14	Did not advance	
Alessandra Cappa	100 m backstroke	1:03.50	26	Did not advance			
Paola Cavallino	200 m butterfly	2:12.34	16 Q	2:10.23	7 Q	2:10.14	7
Cristina Chiuso	50 m freestyle	25.68	16 Q	25.37	13	Did not advance	
Alessia Filippi	200 m backstroke	2:17.29	22	Did not advance			
Alessia Filippi	200 m individual medley	2:19.29	21	Did not advance			
Alessia Filippi	400 m individual medley	4:47.26	16	—N/a		Did not advance	
Ambra Migliori	100 m butterfly	59.47	10 Q	59.53	13	Did not advance	
Federica Pellegrini	100 m freestyle	55.41	9 Q	55.30	10	Did not advance	
Federica Pellegrini	200 m freestyle	1:59.80	4 Q	1:58.02 NR	1 Q	1:58.22	2nd place, silver medalist(s)
Francesca Segat	100 m butterfly	1:00.56	22	Did not advance			
Francesca Segat	200 m butterfly	2:11.40	9 Q	2:11.18	12	Did not advance	
Cristina Chiuso; Sara Parise; Federica Pellegrini; Cecilia Vianini	4 × 100 m freestyle relay	3:44.88	10	—N/a		Did not advance	
Cristina Chiuso; Alessia Filippi; Sara Parise; Cecilia Vianini	4 × 200 m freestyle relay	8:15.30	14	—N/a		Did not advance	
Chiara Boggiatto; Alessandra Cappa; Ambra Migliori; Federica Pellegrini	4 × 100 m medley relay	DSQ		—N/a		Did not advance	

== Synchronized swimming ==
Nine Italian synchronized swimmers qualified a spot in the women's team.

Athlete	Event	Technical routine		Free routine (preliminary)			Free routine (final)		
Athlete	Event	Points	Rank	Points	Total (technical + free)	Rank	Points	Total (technical + free)	Rank
Beatrice Spaziani; Lorena Zaffalon	Duet	46.500	8	46.917	93.417	7 Q	46.750	93.250	8
Monica Cirulli; Costanza Fiorentini; Joey Paccagnella; Elisa Plaisant; Sara Savoia; Beatrice Spaziani; Lorena Zaffalon; Laura Zanazza	Team	46.834	7	—N/a			47.250	94.084	7

== Table tennis ==
Five Italian table tennis players qualified for the following events.

Athlete	Event	Round 1	Round 2	Round 3	Round 4	Quarterfinals	Semifinals	Final / BM	
Athlete	Event	Opposition Result	Opposition Result	Opposition Result	Opposition Result	Opposition Result	Opposition Result	Opposition Result	Rank
Yang Min	Men's singles	Doan (VIE); W 4–1	Karlsson (SWE); L 3–4	Did not advance					
Massimiliano Mondello; Yang Min	Men's doubles	—N/a	Henzell / Zalcberg (AUS); L 1–4	Did not advance					
Laura Negrisoli	Women's singles	Ramos (VEN); W 4–1	Ganina (RUS); L 2–4	Did not advance					
Nikoleta Stefanova	Women's singles	Menaifi (ALG); W 4–0	Schöpp (GER); L 1–4	Did not advance					
Tan Wenling	Women's singles	Bye	Huang Y-H (TPE); W 4–2	Kim K-A (KOR); L 1–4	Did not advance				
Nikoleta Stefanova; Tan Wenling	Women's doubles	Bye	Kaffo / Oshonaike (NGR); W 4–3	Kostromina / Pavlovich (BLR); W 4–2	Wang N / Zhang Yn (CHN); L 0–4	Did not advance			

== Taekwondo ==
Three Italian taekwondo jin qualified to compete.

Athlete	Event	Round of 16	Quarterfinals	Semifinals	Repechage 1	Repechage 2	Final / BM	
Athlete	Event	Opposition Result	Opposition Result	Opposition Result	Opposition Result	Opposition Result	Opposition Result	Rank
Carlo Molfetta	Men's −68 kg	Saei (IRI); L RSC	Did not advance		Silva (BRA); L WO	Did not advance		7
Cristiana Corsi	Women's −57 kg	Épangue (FRA); W 2–0	Abdallah (USA); L 2–3	Did not advance	Mkrtchyan (RUS); W 5–2	Salazar (MEX); L 2–3	Did not advance	5
Daniela Castrignano	Women's +67 kg	Bourguigue (MAR); W 6–4	Baverel (FRA); L 8–8 SUP	Did not advance	Bosshart (CAN); W 6–3	Falavigna (BRA); L 3–6	Did not advance	5

== Tennis ==
Six Italian tennis players (one male and five females) qualified to compete in the tennis tournament.

Men

Athlete	Event	Round of 64	Round of 32	Round of 16	Quarterfinals	Semifinals	Final / BM	
Athlete	Event	Opposition Score	Opposition Score	Opposition Score	Opposition Score	Opposition Score	Opposition Score	Rank
Filippo Volandri	Singles	Santoro (FRA); L 1–6, 2–6	Did not advance					

Women

Athlete	Event	Round of 64	Round of 32	Round of 16	Quarterfinals	Semifinals	Final / BM	
Athlete	Event	Opposition Score	Opposition Score	Opposition Score	Opposition Score	Opposition Score	Opposition Score	Rank
Maria Elena Camerin	Singles	Jugić-Salkić (BIH); W 6–3, 6–4	Mauresmo (FRA); L 0–6, 1–6	Did not advance				
Silvia Farina Elia	Singles	Testud (FRA); W 6–2, 6–0	Raymond (USA); L 1–6, 2–6	Did not advance				
Tathiana Garbin	Singles	Smashnova (ISR); W 6–2, 6–1	Pratt (AUS); L 6-1, 6–7^{(5–7)}, 2–6	Did not advance				
Francesca Schiavone	Singles	Asagoe (JPN); W 6–3, 7–6^{(7–4)}	Cho Y-J (KOR); W 2–6, 7–6^{(7–0)}, 6–4	Zuluaga (COL); W 6–7^{(5–7)}, 6–1, 6–3	Myskina (RUS); L 1–6, 2–6	Did not advance		
Silvia Farina Elia; Francesca Schiavone	Doubles	—N/a	Kurhajcová / Suchá (SVK); W 6–2, 6–4	Li T / Sun Tt (CHN); L 1–6, 6–7^{(1–7)}	Did not advance			
Tathiana Garbin; Roberta Vinci	Doubles	—N/a	Pratt / Stosur (AUS); W 6–0, 6–1	Martínez / Ruano Pascual (ESP); L 3–6, 3–6	Did not advance			

== Triathlon ==
Italy was again represented by three triathletes at the 2004 event, but unlike in the first competition in 2000 all the Italians in 2004 were women. Gemignani, who had been the nation's best finisher four years earlier, dropped one place in the rankings. However, the two Olympic rookies both placed better than Gemignani had in the first race.

Athlete	Event	Swim (1.5 km)	Trans 1	Bike (40 km)	Trans 2	Run (10 km)	Total Time	Rank
Nadia Cortassa	Women's	20:36	0:19	1:09:51	0:22	35:18	2:05:45.35	5
Silvia Gemignani	Women's	18:45	0:21	1:11:41	0:23	38:30	2:08:56.94	21
Beatrice Lanza	Women's	19:47	0:19	1:10:37	0:23	37:35	2:07:59.26	15

== Volleyball ==
=== Beach ===
Athlete	Event	Preliminary round	Standing	Round of 16	Quarterfinals	Semifinals	Final	
Athlete	Event	Opposition Score	Standing	Opposition Score	Opposition Score	Opposition Score	Opposition Score	Rank
Daniela Gattelli; Lucilla Perrotta	Women's	Pool B Fernández – Larrea (CUB); L 1 – 2 (17–21, 21–18, 10–15); Bede – Behar (BRA); L 0 – 2 (17–21, 17–21); Naidoo – Willand (RSA); W 2 – 0 (21–18, 21–14)	3 Q	Lahme – Müsch (GER); W 2 – 1 (16–21, 21–17, 21–19)	Cook – Sanderson (AUS); L 1 – 2 (16–21, 21–14, 12–15)	Did not advance		

=== Indoor ===
==== Men's tournament ====
Roster

The following is the Italian roster in the men's volleyball tournament of the 2004 Summer Olympics.

Head coach: Gian Paolo Montali

№	Name	Date of birth	Height	Weight	Spike	Block	2004 club
1	Luigi Mastrangelo	17 August 1975	2.02 m (6 ft 8 in)	90 kg (200 lb)	368 cm (145 in)	336 cm (132 in)	(Italy) Lube Banca Marche
5	Valerio Vermiglio	1 March 1976	1.90 m (6 ft 3 in)	83 kg (183 lb)	342 cm (135 in)	320 cm (130 in)	(Italy) Sisley Volley
6	Samuele Papi	20 May 1973	1.90 m (6 ft 3 in)	84 kg (185 lb)	345 cm (136 in)	308 cm (121 in)	(Italy) Sisley Volley
7	Andrea Sartoretti	19 June 1971	1.94 m (6 ft 4 in)	88 kg (194 lb)	353 cm (139 in)	319 cm (126 in)	(Italy) Itas Diatec Trentino
8	Alberto Cisolla	10 October 1977	1.97 m (6 ft 6 in)	86 kg (190 lb)	367 cm (144 in)	345 cm (136 in)	(Italy) Sisley Volley
11	Venceslav Simeonov	3 February 1977	2.00 m (6 ft 7 in)	105 kg (231 lb)	358 cm (141 in)	335 cm (132 in)	(Italy) Sempre Volley
12	Damiano Pippi (L)	23 August 1971	1.93 m (6 ft 4 in)	84 kg (185 lb)	323 cm (127 in)	305 cm (120 in)	(Italy) Kerakoll Modena
13	Andrea Giani (c)	22 April 1970	1.96 m (6 ft 5 in)	97 kg (214 lb)	356 cm (140 in)	322 cm (127 in)	(Italy) Kerakoll Modena
14	Alessandro Fei	29 November 1978	2.04 m (6 ft 8 in)	90 kg (200 lb)	352 cm (139 in)	321 cm (126 in)	(Italy) Sisley Volley
15	Paolo Tofoli	14 August 1966	1.88 m (6 ft 2 in)	81 kg (179 lb)	345 cm (136 in)	321 cm (126 in)	(Italy) Itas Diatec Trentino
17	Paolo Cozzi	26 May 1980	2.00 m (6 ft 7 in)	86 kg (190 lb)	363 cm (143 in)	328 cm (129 in)	(Italy) Kerakoll Modena
18	Matej Černič	13 September 1978	1.92 m (6 ft 4 in)	80 kg (180 lb)	354 cm (139 in)	335 cm (132 in)	(Italy) Kerakoll Modena

Group play

Pos	Team	Pld	W	L	Pts	SW	SL	SR	SPW	SPL	SPR	Qualification
1	Brazil	5	4	1	9	13	7	1.857	483	431	1.121	Quarterfinals
2	Italy	5	3	2	8	13	7	1.857	465	434	1.071	Quarterfinals
3	United States	5	3	2	8	11	8	1.375	437	423	1.033	Quarterfinals
4	Russia	5	3	2	8	11	9	1.222	452	430	1.051	Quarterfinals
5	Netherlands	5	2	3	7	7	11	0.636	391	419	0.933	
6	Australia	5	0	5	5	2	15	0.133	331	422	0.784	

Source: FIVB

15 August 2004; 21:30	Italy	3–1	United States	Peace and Friendship Stadium; Attendance: 5,630; Referees: Kun-Tae Kim (KOR), Juan Pereyra (ARG)
15 August 2004; 21:30	(25–21, 21–25, 25–17, 25–23) result			Peace and Friendship Stadium; Attendance: 5,630; Referees: Kun-Tae Kim (KOR), Juan Pereyra (ARG)

17 August 2004; 21:45	Brazil	3–2	Italy	Peace and Friendship Stadium; Attendance: 6,500; Referees: Ning Wang (CHN), Kun-Tae Kim (KOR)
17 August 2004; 21:45	(25–21, 15–25, 25–16, 21–25, 33–31) result			Peace and Friendship Stadium; Attendance: 6,500; Referees: Ning Wang (CHN), Kun-Tae Kim (KOR)

19 August 2004; 09:00	Italy	3–0	Australia	Peace and Friendship Stadium; Attendance: 2,950; Referees: Ibrahim Al-Naama (QAT), Juan Pereyra (ARG)
19 August 2004; 09:00	(25–20, 25–18, 25–21) result			Peace and Friendship Stadium; Attendance: 2,950; Referees: Ibrahim Al-Naama (QAT), Juan Pereyra (ARG)

21 August 2004; 11:20	Italy	3–0	Netherlands	Peace and Friendship Stadium; Attendance: 6,200; Referees: Patrick Rachard (FRA), Bela Hobor (HUN)
21 August 2004; 11:20	(25–19, 25–21, 25–20) result			Peace and Friendship Stadium; Attendance: 6,200; Referees: Patrick Rachard (FRA), Bela Hobor (HUN)

23 August 2004; 11:15	Russia	3–2	Italy	Peace and Friendship Stadium; Attendance: 4,134; Referees: Frank Leuthaeusser (GER), Patrick Rachard (FRA)
23 August 2004; 11:15	(25–16, 25–22, 22–25, 23–25, 15–13) result			Peace and Friendship Stadium; Attendance: 4,134; Referees: Frank Leuthaeusser (GER), Patrick Rachard (FRA)

Quarterfinal

25 August 2004; 16:30	Argentina	1–3	Italy	Peace and Friendship Stadium; Attendance: 8,100; Referees: Hiroyuki Ito (JPN), Ibrahim Al-Naama (QAT)
25 August 2004; 16:30	(25–22, 22–25, 24–26, 26–28) result			Peace and Friendship Stadium; Attendance: 8,100; Referees: Hiroyuki Ito (JPN), Ibrahim Al-Naama (QAT)

Semifinal

27 August 2004; 19:30	Russia	0–3	Italy	Peace and Friendship Stadium; Attendance: 9,380; Referees: Bela Hobor (HUN), Patrick Rachard (FRA)
27 August 2004; 19:30	(16–25, 17–25, 16–25) result			Peace and Friendship Stadium; Attendance: 9,380; Referees: Bela Hobor (HUN), Patrick Rachard (FRA)

Gold Medal Final

29 August 2004; 14:30	Italy	1–3	Brazil	Peace and Friendship Stadium; Attendance: 9,350; Referees: Hiroyuki Ito (JPN), Ning Wang (CHN)
29 August 2004; 14:30	(15–25, 26–24, 20–25, 22–25) result			Peace and Friendship Stadium; Attendance: 9,350; Referees: Hiroyuki Ito (JPN), Ning Wang (CHN)

Won Silver Medal

==== Women's tournament ====
Roster

The following is the Italian roster in the women's volleyball tournament of the 2004 Summer Olympics.

Head coach: Marco Bonitta

No.	Name	Date of birth	Height	Weight	Spike	Block	2004 club
2	Simona Rinieri	1 September 1977	1.88 m (6 ft 2 in)	85 kg (187 lb)	307 cm (121 in)	281 cm (111 in)	(France) RC Cannes
3	Elisa Togut	14 May 1978	1.93 m (6 ft 4 in)	70 kg (150 lb)	320 cm (130 in)	295 cm (116 in)	(Italy) Vini Monteschiavo
4	Manuela Leggeri (c)	9 May 1976	1.86 m (6 ft 1 in)	74 kg (163 lb)	312 cm (123 in)	281 cm (111 in)	(Italy) Vini Monteschiavo
8	Jenny Barazza	24 July 1981	1.88 m (6 ft 2 in)	77 kg (170 lb)	300 cm (120 in)	285 cm (112 in)	(Italy) Foppapedretti Bergamo
9	Nadia Centoni	19 June 1981	1.84 m (6 ft 0 in)	63 kg (139 lb)	307 cm (121 in)	291 cm (115 in)	(Italy) Scavolini Pesaro
10	Paola Paggi	6 December 1976	1.82 m (6 ft 0 in)	72 kg (159 lb)	306 cm (120 in)	278 cm (109 in)	(Italy) Foppapedretti Bergamo
11	Francesca Piccinini	10 January 1979	1.84 m (6 ft 0 in)	75 kg (165 lb)	304 cm (120 in)	279 cm (110 in)	(Italy) Foppapedretti Bergamo
12	Manuela Secolo	22 February 1977	1.80 m (5 ft 11 in)	70 kg (150 lb)	302 cm (119 in)	279 cm (110 in)	(Italy) Foppapedretti Bergamo
14	Eleonora Lo Bianco	22 December 1979	1.71 m (5 ft 7 in)	70 kg (150 lb)	287 cm (113 in)	273 cm (107 in)	(Italy) Vini Monteschiavo
15	Antonella Del Core	5 November 1980	1.80 m (5 ft 11 in)	73 kg (161 lb)	296 cm (117 in)	279 cm (110 in)	(Italy) Scavolini Pesaro
16	Francesca Ferretti	15 February 1984	1.79 m (5 ft 10 in)	70 kg (150 lb)	296 cm (117 in)	280 cm (110 in)	(Italy) Volley Modena
17	Paola Cardullo (L)	18 March 1982	1.62 m (5 ft 4 in)	56 kg (123 lb)	275 cm (108 in)	268 cm (106 in)	(Italy) Asystel Novara

Group play

Pos	Team	Pld	W	L	Pts	SW	SL	SR	SPW	SPL	SPR	Qualification
1	Brazil	5	5	0	10	15	2	7.500	410	326	1.258	Quarterfinals
2	Italy	5	4	1	9	14	3	4.667	392	305	1.285	Quarterfinals
3	South Korea	5	3	2	8	9	7	1.286	355	352	1.009	Quarterfinals
4	Japan	5	2	3	7	6	10	0.600	346	343	1.009	Quarterfinals
5	Greece	5	1	4	6	5	12	0.417	349	383	0.911	
6	Kenya	5	0	5	5	0	15	0.000	236	379	0.623	

Source: FIVB

14 August 2004; 19:30	South Korea	0–3	Italy	Peace and Friendship Stadium; Referees: Fernando Nava (Mex), Francisco Medina Guzman (CUB)
14 August 2004; 19:30	(17–25, 13–25, 19–25) result			Peace and Friendship Stadium; Referees: Fernando Nava (Mex), Francisco Medina Guzman (CUB)

16 August 2004; 14:00	Italy	3–0	Japan	Peace and Friendship Stadium; Referees: Mahmoud Abdel Nagid (EGY), Fernando Nava (Mex)
16 August 2004; 14:00	(25–16, 25–13, 25–17) result			Peace and Friendship Stadium; Referees: Mahmoud Abdel Nagid (EGY), Fernando Nava (Mex)

18 August 2004; 21:30	Brazil	3–2	Italy	Peace and Friendship Stadium; Referees: Patricia Salvatore (USA), Kim Kun-Tae (KOR)
18 August 2004; 21:30	(19–25, 25–13, 22–25, 25–16, 15–13) result			Peace and Friendship Stadium; Referees: Patricia Salvatore (USA), Kim Kun-Tae (KOR)

20 August 2004; 19:30	Kenya	0-3	Italy	Peace and Friendship Stadium; Referees: Francisco Medina Guzman (CUB), Patricia Salvatore (USA)
20 August 2004; 19:30	(17–25, 13–25, 14–25) result			Peace and Friendship Stadium; Referees: Francisco Medina Guzman (CUB), Patricia Salvatore (USA)

22 August 2004; 19:30	Italy	3-0	Greece	Peace and Friendship Stadium; Referees: Jarmo Salonen (FIN), Patrick Rachard (FRA)
22 August 2004; 19:30	(25–19, 25–19, 25–22) result			Peace and Friendship Stadium; Referees: Jarmo Salonen (FIN), Patrick Rachard (FRA)

Quarterfinal

24 August 2004; 19:30	Italy	2-3	Cuba	Peace and Friendship Stadium; Referees: Juan Angel Pereyra (ARG), Mahmoud Abdel Magid (EGY)
24 August 2004; 19:30	(23–25, 25–14, 25–22, 14–25, 12–15) result			Peace and Friendship Stadium; Referees: Juan Angel Pereyra (ARG), Mahmoud Abdel Magid (EGY)

== Water polo ==
=== Men's tournament ===
Roster

The following is the Italian roster in the men's water polo tournament of the 2004 Summer Olympics.

Head coach: Paolo de Crescenzo

№	Name	Pos.	Height	Weight	Date of birth	2004 club
1	Stefano Tempesti	GK	2.02 m (6 ft 8 in)	80 kg (180 lb)	9 June 1979	(Italy) Pro Recco
2	Francesco Postiglione	D	1.86 m (6 ft 1 in)	81 kg (179 lb)	29 April 1972	(Italy) Circolo Nautico Posillipo
3	Leonardo Binchi	CB	2.00 m (6 ft 7 in)	98 kg (216 lb)	27 August 1975	(Italy) Leonessa Brescia
4	Fabrizio Buonocore	CB	1.86 m (6 ft 1 in)	88 kg (194 lb)	28 April 1977	(Italy) Circolo Nautico Posillipo
5	Marco Gerini	GK	1.90 m (6 ft 3 in)	90 kg (200 lb)	5 August 1971	(Italy) Leonessa Brescia
6	Roberto Calcaterra	CF	1.86 m (6 ft 1 in)	90 kg (200 lb)	6 February 1972	(Italy) Leonessa Brescia
7	Goran Fiorentini	D	1.90 m (6 ft 3 in)	85 kg (187 lb)	21 November 1981	(Italy) Leonessa Brescia
8	Alberto Angelini	D	1.76 m (5 ft 9 in)	80 kg (180 lb)	28 September 1974	(Italy) Pro Recco
9	Maurizio Felugo	D	1.89 m (6 ft 2 in)	84 kg (185 lb)	4 March 1981	(Italy) Circolo Nautico Posillipo
10	Alessandro Calcaterra	CF	1.87 m (6 ft 2 in)	106 kg (234 lb)	26 May 1975	(Italy) Chiavari Nuoto
11	Bogdan Rath	D	1.80 m (5 ft 11 in)	80 kg (180 lb)	28 June 1972	(Italy) Rari Nantes Savona
12	Carlo Silipo (C)	D	1.99 m (6 ft 6 in)	95 kg (209 lb)	10 September 1971	(Italy) Circolo Nautico Posillipo
13	Fabio Bencivenga	CF	2.00 m (6 ft 7 in)	100 kg (220 lb)	20 January 1976	(Italy) Circolo Nautico Posillipo

Group play

Pos	Team	Pld	W	D	L	GF	GA	GD	Pts	Qualification
1	Greece	5	4	0	1	43	27	+16	8	Qualified for the semifinals
2	Germany	5	3	1	1	40	28	+12	7	Qualified for the quarterfinals
3	Spain	5	3	0	2	35	31	+4	6	Qualified for the quarterfinals
4	Italy	5	3	0	2	39	24	+15	6	
5	Australia	5	1	1	3	37	35	+2	4	
6	Egypt	5	0	0	5	18	67	−49	0	

15 August 2004; 17:45	Italy	4–5	Spain	Athens Olympic Aquatic Centre; Referees: Margeta (SLO), Tomic (CRO)
15 August 2004; 17:45	Score by quarters: 1-2, 1-3, 0-0, 2-0			Athens Olympic Aquatic Centre; Referees: Margeta (SLO), Tomic (CRO)
15 August 2004; 17:45	4 players with 1	Goals	5 players with 1	Athens Olympic Aquatic Centre; Referees: Margeta (SLO), Tomic (CRO)

17 August 2004; 09:30	Australia	4–8	Italy	Athens Olympic Aquatic Centre; Referees: Tomic (CRO), Chaney (USA)
17 August 2004; 09:30	Score by quarters: 1-1, 2-2, 0-3, 1-2			Athens Olympic Aquatic Centre; Referees: Tomic (CRO), Chaney (USA)
17 August 2004; 09:30	Whalan 2	Goals	Postiglione 3	Athens Olympic Aquatic Centre; Referees: Tomic (CRO), Chaney (USA)

19 August 2004; 17:45	Italy	10–5	Germany	Athens Olympic Aquatic Centre; Referees: Brguljan (SCG), Afanasiev (RUS)
19 August 2004; 17:45	Score by quarters: 2-0, 1-2, 3-2, 4-1			Athens Olympic Aquatic Centre; Referees: Brguljan (SCG), Afanasiev (RUS)
19 August 2004; 17:45	Postiglione 4	Goals	Nossek 3	Athens Olympic Aquatic Centre; Referees: Brguljan (SCG), Afanasiev (RUS)

21 August 2004; 10:45	Egypt	4–13	Italy	Athens Olympic Aquatic Centre; Referees: Rezek (CZE), Pinker (RSA)
21 August 2004; 10:45	Score by quarters: 1-3, 1-0, 2-5, 0-5			Athens Olympic Aquatic Centre; Referees: Rezek (CZE), Pinker (RSA)
21 August 2004; 10:45	El-Sammany 2	Goals	Calcaterra, Angelini 3	Athens Olympic Aquatic Centre; Referees: Rezek (CZE), Pinker (RSA)

23 August 2004; 22:15	Greece	6–4	Italy	Athens Olympic Aquatic Centre; Referees: Balfanbayev (KAZ), Bookelman (NED)
23 August 2004; 22:15	Score by quarters: 1-0, 1-2, 2-1, 2-1			Athens Olympic Aquatic Centre; Referees: Balfanbayev (KAZ), Bookelman (NED)
23 August 2004; 22:15	6 players with 1	Goals	Bencivenga 2	Athens Olympic Aquatic Centre; Referees: Balfanbayev (KAZ), Bookelman (NED)

7th-10th Semifinal

27 August 2004; 17:00	Italy	11–7	Croatia	Athens Olympic Aquatic Centre; Referees: Afanasiev (RUS), Koryzna (POL)
27 August 2004; 17:00	Score by quarters: 2-1, 3-4, 1-1, 5-1			Athens Olympic Aquatic Centre; Referees: Afanasiev (RUS), Koryzna (POL)
27 August 2004; 17:00	Bencivenga 3	Goals	Franković 3	Athens Olympic Aquatic Centre; Referees: Afanasiev (RUS), Koryzna (POL)

7th-8th Place Final

29 August 2004; 10:45	United States	9–8	Italy	Athens Olympic Aquatic Centre; Referees: Afanasiev (RUS), Margeta (SLO)
29 August 2004; 10:45	Score by quarters: 2-2, 2-0, 2-3, 3-3			Athens Olympic Aquatic Centre; Referees: Afanasiev (RUS), Margeta (SLO)
29 August 2004; 10:45	Azevedo, Smith 3	Goals	Angelini 3	Athens Olympic Aquatic Centre; Referees: Afanasiev (RUS), Margeta (SLO)

=== Women's tournament ===
Roster

The following is the Italian roster in the women's water polo tournament of the 2004 Summer Olympics.

Head coach: Pierluigi Formiconi

№	Name	Pos.	Height	Weight	Date of birth	2004 club
1	Francesca Conti	GK	1.79 m (5 ft 10 in)	71 kg (157 lb)	21 May 1972	(Italy) Geymonat Orizzonte
2	Martina Miceli	D	1.68 m (5 ft 6 in)	65 kg (143 lb)	22 October 1973	(Italy) Firenze Pallanuoto
3	Carmela Allucci (C)	D	1.67 m (5 ft 6 in)	60 kg (130 lb)	22 January 1970	(Italy) Firenze Pallanuoto
4	Silvia Bosurgi	D	1.65 m (5 ft 5 in)	61 kg (134 lb)	17 April 1979	(Italy) Geymonat Orizzonte
5	Elena Gigli	GK	1.90 m (6 ft 3 in)	70 kg (150 lb)	9 July 1985	(Italy) AS Certaldo
6	Manuela Zanchi	D	1.83 m (6 ft 0 in)	65 kg (143 lb)	17 October 1977	(Italy) Rari Nantes Pescara
7	Tania di Mario	D	1.67 m (5 ft 6 in)	59 kg (130 lb)	4 May 1979	(Italy) Geymonat Orizzonte
8	Cinzia Ragusa	CB	1.72 m (5 ft 8 in)	70 kg (150 lb)	24 May 1977	(Italy) Geymonat Orizzonte
9	Giusi Malato	CF	1.70 m (5 ft 7 in)	77 kg (170 lb)	9 July 1971	(Italy) Geymonat Orizzonte
10	Alexandra Araujo	CF	1.67 m (5 ft 6 in)	67 kg (148 lb)	13 July 1972	(Italy) GIFA Città di Palermo
11	Maddalena Musumeci	CF	1.70 m (5 ft 7 in)	63 kg (139 lb)	26 March 1976	(Italy) Geymonat Orizzonte
12	Melania Grego	D	1.71 m (5 ft 7 in)	72 kg (159 lb)	19 June 1973	(Italy) Volturno SC
13	Noémi Tóth	CB	1.80 m (5 ft 11 in)	67 kg (148 lb)	7 June 1976	(Italy) Volturno SC

Group play

Pos	Team	Pld	W	D	L	GF	GA	GD	Pts	Qualification
1	Australia	3	2	1	0	22	16	+6	5	Qualified for the Semifinals
2	Italy	3	2	0	1	20	14	+6	4	Qualified for the Quarterfinals
3	Greece	3	1	1	1	17	20	−3	3	Qualified for the Quarterfinals
4	Kazakhstan	3	0	0	3	16	25	−9	0	

16 August 2004; 10:45	Report	Australia	6–5	Italy	Athens Olympic Aquatic Centre; Referees: Peter Bookelman (NED); Sergio Borrell (ESP)
16 August 2004; 10:45	Report	Score by quarters: 3–1, 1–2, 1–1, 1–1			Athens Olympic Aquatic Centre; Referees: Peter Bookelman (NED); Sergio Borrell (ESP)
16 August 2004; 10:45	Report	Gynther 2 Heuchan 2 Norwood 1 Rippon 1	Goals	Allucci 1 di Mario 1 Miceli 1 Musumeci 1 Zanchi 1	Athens Olympic Aquatic Centre; Referees: Peter Bookelman (NED); Sergio Borrell (ESP)

18 August 2004; 17:45	Report	Greece	2–7	Italy	Athens Olympic Aquatic Centre; Referees: Sergio Borrell (ESP); Radosław Koryzna (POL)
18 August 2004; 17:45	Report	Score by quarters: 0–3, 2–2, 0–1, 0–1			Athens Olympic Aquatic Centre; Referees: Sergio Borrell (ESP); Radosław Koryzna (POL)
18 August 2004; 17:45	Report	Liosi 1 Moraitidou 1	Goals	di Mario 3 Miceli 3 Musumeci 1	Athens Olympic Aquatic Centre; Referees: Sergio Borrell (ESP); Radosław Koryzna (POL)

20 August 2004; 09:00	Report	Italy	8–6	Kazakhstan	Athens Olympic Aquatic Centre; Referees: Mario Brguljan (SCG); Yesenia Marrero (USA)
20 August 2004; 09:00	Report	Score by quarters: 2–0, 3–1, 1–4, 2–1			Athens Olympic Aquatic Centre; Referees: Mario Brguljan (SCG); Yesenia Marrero (USA)
20 August 2004; 09:00	Report	di Mario 4 Araujo 1 Miceli 1 Tóth 1 Zanchi 1	Goals	Koroleva 3 Gubina 2 Mikhailova 1	Athens Olympic Aquatic Centre; Referees: Mario Brguljan (SCG); Yesenia Marrero (USA)

Quarterfinal

22 August 2004; 18:15	Report	Italy	8–5	Hungary	Athens Olympic Aquatic Centre; Referees: Sergio Borrell (ESP); Boris Margeta (SLO)
22 August 2004; 18:15	Report	Score by quarters: 2–1, 2–2, 2–2, 2–0			Athens Olympic Aquatic Centre; Referees: Sergio Borrell (ESP); Boris Margeta (SLO)
22 August 2004; 18:15	Report	di Mario 3 Bosurgi 1 Grego 1 Malato 1 Miceli 1 Ragusa 1	Goals	Dravucz 2 Stieber 2 Pelle 1	Athens Olympic Aquatic Centre; Referees: Sergio Borrell (ESP); Boris Margeta (SLO)

Semifinal

24 August 2004; 17:00	Report	United States	5–6	Italy	Athens Olympic Aquatic Centre; Referees: Gábor Kiszelly (HUN); Zoran Tomić (CRO)
24 August 2004; 17:00	Report	Score by quarters: 2–1, 1–1, 1–0, 1–4			Athens Olympic Aquatic Centre; Referees: Gábor Kiszelly (HUN); Zoran Tomić (CRO)
24 August 2004; 17:00	Report	Dingeldein 1 Estes 1 Munro 1 Petri 1 Villa 1	Goals	di Mario 2 Araujo 1 Malato 1 Ragusa 1 Zanchi 1	Athens Olympic Aquatic Centre; Referees: Gábor Kiszelly (HUN); Zoran Tomić (CRO)

Gold Medal Final

26 August 2004; 18:15	Report	Greece	9–10 (OT)	Italy	Athens Olympic Aquatic Centre; Referees: Boris Margeta (SLO); Gábor Kiszelly (HUN)
26 August 2004; 18:15	Report	Score by quarters: 3–2, 3–3, 0–1, 1–1 OT: 2–2, 0–1			Athens Olympic Aquatic Centre; Referees: Boris Margeta (SLO); Gábor Kiszelly (HUN)
26 August 2004; 18:15	Report	Liosi 5 Moraitidou 3 Oikonomopoulou 1	Goals	Grego 3 Miceli 3 Bosurgi 1 Malato 1 di Mario 1 Zanchi 1	Athens Olympic Aquatic Centre; Referees: Boris Margeta (SLO); Gábor Kiszelly (HUN)

Won Gold Medal

== Wrestling ==
Key

- VT - Victory by Fall.
- PP - Decision by Points - the loser with technical points.
- PO - Decision by Points - the loser without technical points.

Men's freestyle

Athlete	Event	Elimination Pool				Quarterfinal	Semifinal	Final / BM	
Athlete	Event	Opposition Result	Opposition Result	Opposition Result	Rank	Opposition Result	Opposition Result	Opposition Result	Rank
Salvatore Rinella	−74 kg	Abdo (AUS); W 4–0 ^{ST}	Haidarau (BLR); L 1–3 ^{PP}	—N/a	2	Did not advance			7
Francesco Miano-Petta	−120 kg	McCoy (USA); L 0–3 ^{PO}	Mutalimov (KAZ); L 0–3 ^{PO}	Mildzihov (KGZ); W 5–0 ^{VB}	3	Did not advance			10

Men's Greco-Roman

Athlete	Event	Elimination Pool			Quarterfinal	Semifinal	Final / BM	
Athlete	Event	Opposition Result	Opposition Result	Rank	Opposition Result	Opposition Result	Opposition Result	Rank
Paolo Fucile	−60 kg	Chachua (GEO); L 0–4 ^{ST}	Koizhaiganov (KAZ); L 0–3 ^{PO}	3	Did not advance			22
Andrea Minguzzi	−84 kg	Geghamyan (ARM); L 0–4 ^{ST}	Makaranka (BLR); L 0–5 ^{VT}	3	Did not advance			17

Women's freestyle

Athlete	Event	Elimination Pool			Classification	Semifinal	Final / BM	
Athlete	Event	Opposition Result	Opposition Result	Rank	Opposition Result	Opposition Result	Opposition Result	Rank
Diletta Giampiccolo	−55 kg	Sun Dm (CHN); L 1–3 ^{PP}	Yoshida (JPN); L 0–4 ^{ST}	3	Did not advance			10
Katarzyna Juszczak	−72 kg	Wang X (CHN); L 0–3 ^{PO}	Nordhagen (CAN); L 1–3 ^{PP}	3	Did not advance			11

== See also ==
- Italy at the 2004 Summer Paralympics
- Italy at the 2005 Mediterranean Games
