= Softball at the 2004 Summer Olympics – Team squads =

Below are the team squads for the Softball at the 2004 Summer Olympics which took place in the Olympic Softball Stadium in the Helliniko Olympic Complex from August 14 to August 23, 2004.

== Australia ==
Australia
Position	No.	Player	Birth	Club in 2004
C	3	Marissa Carpadios	DEC/30/1977	Brisbane Panthers (East Brisbane, Queensland)
P	5	Melanie Roche	NOV/09/1970	Miki House (Yao, Osaka, JPN)
IF	6	Natalie Ward	DEC/24/1975
P	7	Tanya Harding	JAN/23/1972	Queensland Academy of Sport Heatwave (Brisbane, Queensland)
OF	8	Sandra Allen	OCT/11/1978
P	9	Tracey Mosley	SEP/25/1973	West Torrens (Adelaide, South Australia)
P	10	Brooke Wilkins	JUN/06/1974	Brisbane Panthers (East Brisbane, Queensland)
IF	11	Peta Edebone	FEB/09/1969	Rebels Softball Club
P	14	Kerry Wyborn	DEC/22/1977	Cumberland Nepean (Sydney, NSW)
IF	16	Stacey Porter	MAR/29/1982	University of Hawaii (Hawaii, USA)
IF	21	Natalie Titcume	DEC/06/1975	Hills Missiles (Sydney, NSW)
IF	25	Fiona Crawford	FEB/21/1977	Hills Missiles (Sydney, NSW)
OF	26	Simmone Morrow	OCT/31/1976	Bears (Brisbane, Queensland)
OF	27	Natalie Hodgskin	MAY/24/1976	Bears (Brisbane, Queensland)
IF	28	Amanda Doman	OCT/24/1977	Brisbane Panthers (East Brisbane, Queensland)
Bench Coaches
Team; Manager		Simon Roskvist	AUG/07/1958
Coach		Lloyd Howlett	JAN/17/1948
Coach		Kere Johanson	DEC/07/1964
Coach		Terry Downes	DEC/09/1972

== Canada ==
Canada
Position	No.	Player	Birth	Club in 2004
IF	2	Erin White	OCT/27/1977	Team Canada
P	3	Lauren Bay	AUG/09/1981	White Rock Renegades (British Columbia)
IF	4	Sheena Lawrick	JUN/22/1983	Calgary Double Diamonds Renegades
OF	6	Rachel Schill	JUN/09/1982	Simon Fraser University
OF	7	Sasha Olson	SEP/23/1976	Delta Heat (British Columbia)
IF	9	Cindy Eadie	SEP/21/1982	Markham Tigers
IF	10	Kristy Odamura	OCT/03/1977	Team Canada
IF	11	Angela Lichty	DEC/30/1979	Delta Heat (British Columbia)
P	15	Ani Nyhus	AUG/18/1983	White Rock Renegades (British Columbia)
OF	17	Alison Bradley	APR/27/1979	Brampton Blazers (Ontario)
C	18	Erin Cumpstone	NOV/04/1980	Burnaby (British Columbia)
C	22	Kim Sarrazin	SEP/17/1977	Team Canada
P	24	Auburn Sigurdson	APR/06/1981	White Rock Renegades (British Columbia)
P	27	Kaila Holtz	SEP/26/1981	Team Canada
OF	32	Jackie Lance	MAY/09/1974	White Rock Renegades (British Columbia)
Bench Coaches
Team; Manager		Mike Renney	SEP/10/1964
Coach		Glenn Boles	MAR/24/1951
Coach		Patrick Murphy	NOV/28/1965

== China ==
China
Position	No.	Player	Birth	Club in 2004
P	4	Lu Wei	JUN/21/1983
IF	5	Deng Xiaoling	AUG/26/1974	Sichuan
P	7	Li Qi	OCT/30/1983	Dalian
C	8	Mi Renrong	SEP/07/1977
IF	9	Wang Xiaoyan	NOV/13/1970	Zhengzhou City
IF	10	Zhang Ai	SEP/23/1981	Shanghai Sports School
OF	11	Mu Xia	APR/08/1974	Tianjin
IF	12	Wu Di	MAR/01/1982
P	15	Wei Qiang	APR/25/1972	Beijing
IF	18	Li Chunxia	MAR/04/1977
OF	19	Zhou Yi	JUL/20/1983	Chengdu City
P	21	Zhang Lixia	JAN/25/1977	Lanzhou
OF	23	Luo Lin	APR/06/1979
IF	25	Tao Hua	DEC/12/1972	Shanghai
C	29	Guo Jia	SEP/24/1980	Changsha
Bench Coaches
Team; Manager		Treshan McDonald	FEB/10/1959
Coach		Xu Fumin	AUG/11/1954
Coach		Chen Wenyuan	JAN/15/1963

== Chinese Taipei ==
Chinese Taipei
Position	No.	Player	Birth	Club in 2004
IF	6	Yen Show-tzu	OCT/19/1971	Taipei
P	9	Lin Su-hua	OCT/12/1980	Taiwan National University
OF	10	Huang Hui-wen	FEB/03/1980
OF	11	Li Chiu-ching	OCT/09/1982
IF	12	Chen Miao-yi	FEB/23/1983	National Normal University
IF	13	Wang Shiao-ping	JUN/22/1981
IF	15	Chang Li-chiu	FEB/29/1980
IF	18	Wang Ya-fen	OCT/08/1969	Taipei
P	21	Lai Sheng-jung	DEC/27/1978	Taipei National University
P	22	Wu Chia-yen	JUN/28/1980	Taiwan National University
C	23	Yang Hui-chun	APR/10/1970	Taipei Country
P	26	Lin Po-jen	MAR/26/1981	National Taiwan University
OF	27	Tung Yun-chi	DEC/27/1981	Taichung
IF	28	Pan Tzu-hui	JAN/08/1983	Taipei
OF	36	Chen Feng-yin	DEC/19/1979	Taichung
Bench Coaches
Team; Manager		Ni Chao-liang	JUN/04/1951
Coach		Chiu Li-su	OCT/02/1969
Coach		Chen Jye-yen	FEB/02/1953

== Greece ==
Greece
Position	No.	Player	Birth	Club in 2004
OF	1	Lindsey Bashor	MAY/26/1983	University of Iowa
C	5	Stacey Farnworth	NOV/11/1979	American Pastime (California, USA)
IF	7	Katina Kramos	JUL/12/1972
P	8	Stephanie Skegas Maxwell	AUG/30/1968	Southern California Sliders (California, USA)
IF	9	Jamie Farnworth	JAN/14/1982
IF	12	Chloe Kloezeman	MAY/29/1986	Sorceres (California, USA)
IF	13	Ginny Georgantas	NOV/28/1979	Whiteford Sharks (Illinois, USA)
P	15	Sarah Farnworth	JAN/07/1979
P	16	Kristen Karanzias	FEB/08/1984	Orange County Batbusters (California, USA)
IF	19	Joanna Gail	APR/11/1986	San Diego Thunder Under 18 Gold (California, USA)
IF	21	Vanessa Czarnecki	DEC/21/1979	Fresno State Bulldogs (California, USA)
OF	25	Lindsay James	APR/26/1980	California Gold Bears (California, USA)
OF	26	Joanna Bouziou	MAY/14/1973	Tason, Keratsini
OF	31	Jessica Bashor	APR/08/1981
OF	32	Aikaterini Koutougkou	JUL/21/1976	Marousi 2004
Bench Coaches
Team; Manager		Linda Wells	DEC/13/1949
Coach		Christa Dalakis	NOV/17/1975	Marylanders (Maryland, USA)
Coach		Diane Lynn Ninemire	FEB/12/1957

== Italy ==
Italy
Position	No.	Player	Birth	Club in 2004
C	1	Ilaria Pino	FEB/18/1983	Rhea Vendors Caronno
C	2	Eva Trevisan	APR/21/1980	Fiorini Forli
IF	3	Sabrina Del Mastio	MAR/10/1971	Fiorini Forli
IF	4	Stefania Vitaliani	JUL/16/1975	Fiorini Forli
OF	7	Natalia Cimin	JUL/31/1979	Caserta
IF	8	Jennifer Spediacci	APR/05/1978	Fiorini Forli
IF	12	Marta Gambella	JUN/07/1974	Mosca Macerata
P	13	Nicole Di Salvio	NOV/23/1979	Bussolengo
P	15	Daniela Castellani	JUN/30/1975	Avesani Bussolengo
P	16	Leslie Malerich	FEB/29/1980
P	17	Susan Bugliarello	OCT/18/1975
IF	22	Natalie Anter	APR/26/1980	Fiorini Forli
OF	23	Francesca Francolini	DEC/27/1979	Mosca Macerata
P	24	Annalisa Turci	SEP/26/1976	Fiorini Forli
OF	31	Samanta Bardini	FEB/27/1977	Caggiati Langhirano
Bench Coaches
Team; Manager		Barry Blanchard	MAR/22/1935
Coach		Monica Corvino	AUG/17/1963
Coach		Giacomo Livi	AUG/17/1954
Coach		Marina Centrone	APR/22/1960

== Japan ==
Japan
Position	No.	Player	Birth	Club in 2004
IF	3	Masumi Mishina	MAR/12/1982	Hitachi Takasaki
IF	4	Emi Naito	OCT/06/1979	Toyota Industries Corp.
IF	5	Rie Sato	AUG/14/1980	Leo Palace 21
OF	7	Yumi Iwabuchi	SEP/10/1979	Hitachi Takasaki
OF	11	Eri Yamada	MAR/08/1984	Hitachi Software
P	12	Naoko Sakamoto	MAY/11/1985	Hitachi Takasaki
P	15	Yuki Sato	NOV/03/1980	Leo Palace 21
P	17	Yukiko Ueno	JUL/22/1982	Hitachi Takasaki
P	18	Juri Takayama	OCT/21/1976	Toyota Industries Corp.
IF	19	Kazue Ito	DEC/22/1977	Hitachi Takasaki
P	21	Hiroko Sakai	NOV/03/1978	Toda Chūō General Hospital
C	23	Emi Inui	OCT/26/1983	Hitachi Takasaki
C	25	Noriko Yamaji	SEP/17/1970	Taiyo Yuden
OF	26	Haruka Saito	MAR/14/1970	Hitachi Software
IF	28	Reika Utsugi	JUN/01/1963	Hitachi Takasaki
Bench Coaches
Team; Manager	30	Taeko Utsugi	APR/06/1953
Coach		Mitsufumi Urano	JAN/25/1953
Coach		Yoshimi Kobayashi	AUG/11/1968

== United States ==
United States
Position	No.	Player	Birth	Club in 2004
OF	2	Jessica Mendoza	NOV/11/1980	Stanford University
IF	3	Lovieanne Jung	JAN/11/1980	Arizona Wildcats
IF	6	Crystl Bustos	SEP/08/1977	Palm Beach Community College
P	7	Amanda Freed	DEC/26/1979	UCLA Bruins
P	8	Cat Osterman	APR/16/1983	University of Texas Longhorns
IF	11	Tairia Flowers	JAN/09/1981	UCLA
OF	12	Kelly Kretschman	AUG/26/1979	University of Alabama
P	16	Lisa Fernandez	FEB/22/1971	UCLA
IF	20	Leah Amico	SEP/09/1974	University of Arizona
P	21	Lori Harrigan	SEP/05/1970	UNLV
P	27	Jennie Finch	SEP/03/1980	Arizona Wildcats
IF	29	Natasha Watley	NOV/27/1981	Univ. of California Los Angeles Bruins
C	31	Jenny Topping	MAY/30/1980	Cal State Fullerton
C	33	Stacey Nuveman	APR/26/1978	UCLA
OF	44	Laura Berg	JAN/06/1975	Fresno State
Bench Coaches
Team; Manager		Mike Candrea	AUG/29/1955
Coach		Ken Eriksen	JAN/31/1961
Coach		John Rittman	OCT/05/1963
