= Ana Montero =

Olympic synchronized swimmer

Personal information
- Born: 7 November 1980 (age 45) Madrid, Spain

Sport
- Sport: Synchronised swimming
Medal record
Representing Spain
World Championships
Silver medal – second place	2003 Barcelona	Team, free routine
European Championships
Gold medal – first place	2004 Madrid	Team, free routine
Silver medal – second place	2002 Berlin	Team
Silver medal – second place	2004 Madrid	Team, free routine

Ana Montero Pacheco (born 7 November 1980) is a Spanish swimming coach and former synchronized swimmer who competed in the 2004 Summer Olympics where she was part of the Spanish team that finished fourth in the team event.

She also took a World Championship silver medal and three European Championship medals during her career. After retiring from competition she joined the Royal Spanish Swimming Federation as a coach, initially at junior level, before being appointed technical director for the national team in September 2012.
