= Erin Woods =

Erin Woods may refer to:

- Erin Woods, Calgary, a residential neighbourhood in Calgary, Alberta
- Erin White (softball), née Woods, Canadian softball player
