= Thomassin (disambiguation) =

Thomassin may refer to:

== People ==
=== Surnames ===
- Claude Thomassin, French bow maker, or Archetier
- Florence Thomassin, French actress and sculptor
- Laurie Thomassin, French retired breaststroke swimmer
- Louis Thomassin, (1619-1695) French theologian and Oratorian
- Antoine de Thomassin de Peynier (1731–1809), officer of the French Royal Navy

== Places ==
- Thomassin, a neighborhood of Pétion-Ville, Haiti
