= Spaziani =

Spaziani is an Italian surname. Notable people with the surname include:

- Beatrice Spaziani (born 1984), Italian synchronized swimmer
- Brenda Spaziani (born 1984), Italian diver
- Frank Spaziani (born 1947), American football player and coach
- Maria Luisa Spaziani (1923–2014), Italian poet
- Monique Spaziani (born 1957), Canadian actress
