= Anter =

Surname list

Anter is a surname. Notable people with the surname include:

- Musa Anter (1920–1992), Kurdish-Turkish writer, journalist, and intellectual
- Natalie Anter (born 1980), Italian softball player

== See also ==
- Ante (name)
