= Ione Serrano =

Spanish former synchronized swimmer (born 1979)

Personal information
- Born: 26 April 1979 (age 47) Las Palmas, Canary Islands, Spain

Sport
- Sport: Synchronised swimming
Medal record
Representing Spain
World Championships
Silver medal – second place	2003 Barcelona	Team, free routine
European Championships
Gold medal – first place	2004 Madrid	Team, free routine
Silver medal – second place	2004 Madrid	Team, free

Saray Ione Serrano Afonso (born 26 April 1979) is a Spanish former synchronized swimmer who competed in the 2004 Summer Olympics.
