= Maria Christodoulou =

Greek synchronized swimmer

Personal information
- Born: 28 November 1980 (age 45) Volos, Greece

Sport
- Sport: Synchronised swimming
Medal record
Representing Greece
European Championships
Bronze medal – third place	2004 Madrid	Team

Maria Christodoulou (also spelled Khristodoulou), (Greek: Μαρία Χριστοδούλου); born 28 November 1980) is a Greek former synchronized swimmer who competed in the 2004 Summer Olympics.
