= Apostolia Ioannou =

Greek synchronized swimmer

Personal information
- Born: August 31, 1979 (age 46) Volos, Greece

Sport
- Sport: Synchronised swimming
Medal record
Representing Greece
European Championships
Bronze medal – third place	2004 Madrid	Team, free routine

Apostolia Ioannou (born 31 August 1979) is a Greek former synchronized swimmer who competed in the 2004 Summer Olympics.
