= Marocchi =

Marocchi is an Italian surname. Notable people with the surname include:

- Gary Marocchi (born 1955), Australian footballer and manager
- Giancarlo Marocchi (born 1965), Italian footballer
- Valentina Marocchi (born 1983), Italian diver
