= Effrosyni Gouda =

Greek synchronized swimmer

Personal information
- Born: 15 September 1984 (age 41) Serres, Greece

Sport
- Sport: Synchronised swimming
Medal record
Representing Greece
European Championships
Bronze medal – third place	2004 Madrid	Team, free routine

Effrosyni Gouda (born 15 September 1984) is a Greek former synchronized swimmer who competed in the 2004 Summer Olympics, held in Athens.
