= Tony Adam =

German diver

Personal information
- Nationality: German
- Born: 18 January 1986 (age 40) Dresden, East Germany
- Height: 1.69 m (5 ft 7 in)
- Weight: 61 kg (134 lb)

Sport
- Sport: Diving
Medal record
Men's diving
Representing Germany
European Championships
Silver medal – second place	2004 Madrid	10 m synchro

Tony Adam (born 18 January 1986) is a German diver. He competed in the 2004 Summer Olympics.
