= Richárd Bodor =

Hungarian swimmer (born 1979)

Personal information
- Native name: Bodor Richárd
- Nationality: Hungary
- Born: 10 May 1979 (age 47) Pécs, Baranya, Hungary
- Height: 1.82 m (6 ft 0 in)
- Weight: 73 kg (161 lb)

Sport
- Sport: Swimming
- Strokes: Breaststroke
- Club: Pécsi TÁSI/Pécsi USK
Medal record
European Championships (LC)
Bronze medal – third place	2004 Madrid	100 m breaststroke
Bronze medal – third place	2004 Madrid	200 m breaststroke
Bronze medal – third place	2004 Madrid	4×100 m medley
European Championships (SC)
Bronze medal – third place	2002 Riesa	200 m breaststroke
Summer Universiade
Bronze medal – third place	2001 Beijing	100 m breaststroke

Richárd Bodor (born 10 March 1979 in Pécs, Baranya) is a breaststroke swimmer from Hungary, who won three bronze medals at the 2004 European Championships in Madrid, Spain. He represented his native country at the 2004 Summer Olympics in Athens, Greece, where he was eliminated in the semi-finals of the men's 100 m breaststroke.
