= Olga Pelekanou =

Greek synchronized swimmer

Personal information
- Born: 23 May 1981 (age 45) Thessaloniki, Greece

Sport
- Sport: Synchronised swimming
Medal record
Representing Greece
European Championships
Bronze medal – third place	2004 Madrid	Team, free routine

Olga Pelekanou (born 23 May 1981) is a Greek former synchronized swimmer who competed in the 2004 Summer Olympics.
