= Eleni Georgiou =

Greek synchronized swimmer

Personal information
- Born: 19 December 1985 (age 40) Athens, Greece

Sport
- Sport: Synchronised swimming
Medal record
Representing Greece
European Championships
Bronze medal – third place	2004 Madrid	Team, free routine

Eleni Georgiou (born 19 December 1985) is a Greek former synchronized swimmer who competed in the 2004 Summer Olympics.

== International achievements ==
European Championship
Year	Location	Medal	Event
2004	Madrid	Silver	Free combination
