= M86 Swimming Center =

Pools complex in Spain

Coordinates: 40.4152°N 3.6667°W

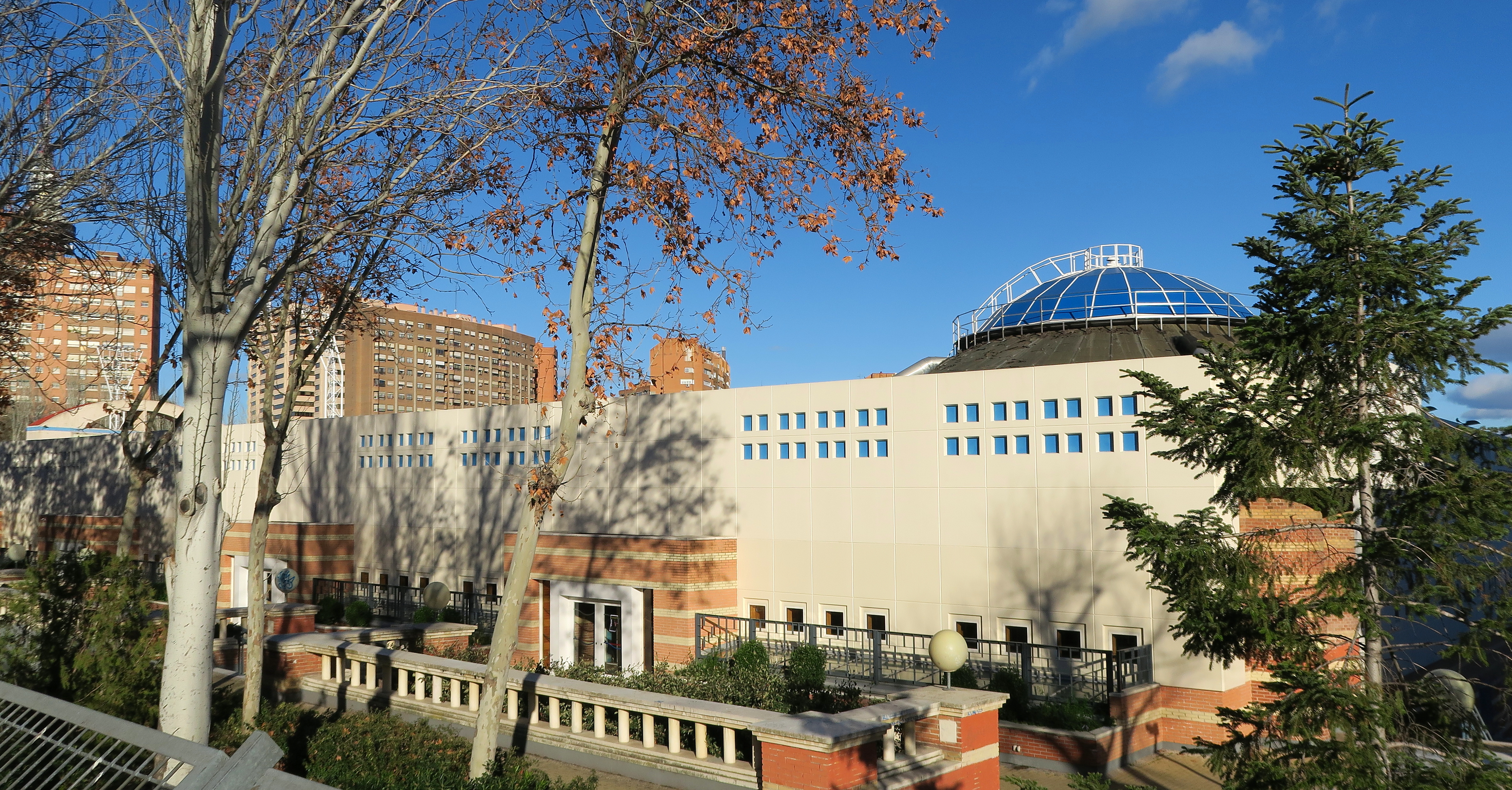
Swimming Center M-86 in Madrid

The Swimming Center M-86 is a complex of pools in southeast of Madrid, Spain. The headquarters of the Royal Spanish Swimming Federation are located there.

== Overview ==
The official opening was on 14 May 1986. The complex was built to host the 5th World Aquatics Championships held in August 1986. The name of the swimming center is derived from this event (M-86: Madrid 1986). Its area is about 21,000 square meters.

== Events ==
The indoor pool of the M-86 Swimming Center has staged the following events:

- Spanish League
- FINA Water Polo World League
- Spanish Aquatics Championships
- 2004 European Aquatics Championships
- 2011 Women's European U-17 Junior Championships in Water Polo
- World Championships Qualification Tournament in Water Polo.

== Awards ==
- 1986: Gold Medal for the best aquatics facility (awarded by the National Pool in Washington, D.C., United States)
- 1989: National Award (awarded by the Sports Quality Association)
- 1989: World's largest swimming complex (included in the Guinness Book of World Records)
- Silver Medal, Category A, as a High Level Training Center (awarded by the IAKS - International Association for Sports and Leisure Facilities)

== See also ==
- Piscines Bernat Picornell
