= Evgenia Koutsoudi =

Greek synchronized swimmer

Personal information
- Born: 31 January 1984 (age 42) Thessaloniki, Greece

Sport
- Sport: Synchronised swimming
Medal record
Representing Greece
European Championships
Bronze medal – third place	2004 Madrid	Team, free routine

Evgenia Koutsoudi (born 31 January 1984) is a Greek former synchronized swimmer who competed in the 2004 Summer Olympics.
