= 2004 European Aquatics Championships =

Water sport competitions

27th European Aquatics Championships
- Host city: Madrid, Spain
- Date(s): 5–16 May 2004
- Venue(s): M86 Swimming Center
- Events: 58

The 2004 LEN European Championships were held in Madrid, Spain from 5–16 May, at the M86 Swimming Center in the southeast of the city. The championships brought together the European Championships in swimming (long course), open water swimming, diving and synchronised swimming. Since the event was held less than three months before the Summer Olympics in Athens, Greece, some of the participating nations used the event therefore as a qualifying tournament for the Olympics.

== Medal table ==
* Host nation (Spain)

| Rank | Nation | Gold | Silver | Bronze | Total |
|---|---|---|---|---|---|
| 1 | Ukraine | 11 | 3 | 6 | 20 |
| 2 | Russia | 10 | 15 | 5 | 30 |
| 3 | Italy | 8 | 5 | 12 | 25 |
| 4 | Germany | 7 | 4 | 4 | 15 |
| 5 | France | 6 | 7 | 4 | 17 |
| 6 | Spain* | 3 | 6 | 4 | 13 |
| 7 | Austria | 3 | 1 | 1 | 5 |
| 8 | Hungary | 2 | 1 | 3 | 6 |
| 8 | Sweden | 2 | 1 | 3 | 6 |
| 10 | Romania | 1 | 3 | 5 | 9 |
| 11 | Netherlands | 1 | 3 | 2 | 6 |
| 12 | Finland | 1 | 2 | 0 | 3 |
| 13 | Slovakia | 1 | 1 | 0 | 2 |
| 14 | Poland | 1 | 0 | 1 | 2 |
| 15 | Czech Republic | 1 | 0 | 0 | 1 |
| 16 | Slovenia | 0 | 3 | 2 | 5 |
| 17 | Belarus | 0 | 2 | 0 | 2 |
| 18 | Great Britain | 0 | 1 | 0 | 1 |
| 18 | Lithuania | 0 | 1 | 0 | 1 |
| 20 | Bulgaria | 0 | 0 | 2 | 2 |
| 20 | Denmark | 0 | 0 | 2 | 2 |
| 20 | Greece | 0 | 0 | 2 | 2 |
| 23 | Croatia | 0 | 0 | 1 | 1 |
| Totals (23 entries) | | 58 | 59 | 59 | 176 |

== Swimming ==
=== Men's events ===
| Event | Gold | Silver | Bronze |
|---|---|---|---|
| 50 m freestyle | Alexander Popov; Russia | Stefan Nystrand; Sweden | Lorenzo Vismara; Italy |
| 100 m freestyle | Filippo Magnini; Italy | Pieter van den Hoogenband; Netherlands | Christian Galenda; Italy |
| 200 m freestyle | Pieter van den Hoogenband; Netherlands | Andrey Kapralov; Russia | Filippo Magnini; Italy; Massimiliano Rosolino; Italy |
| 400 m freestyle | Emiliano Brembilla; Italy | Yuri Prilukov; Russia | Dragoş Coman; Romania |
| 1500 m freestyle | Yuri Prilukov; Russia | Igor Chervynskyi; Ukraine | Dragoş Coman; Romania |
| 50 m backstroke | Stev Theloke; Germany | Darius Grigalionis; Lithuania | David Ortega; Spain |
| 100 m backstroke | László Cseh; Hungary | Markus Rogan; Austria | Stev Theloke; Germany |
| 200 m backstroke | Markus Rogan; Austria | Răzvan Florea; Romania | Simon Dufour; France |
| 50 m breaststroke | Oleg Lisogor; Ukraine | Hugues Duboscq; France | Matjaž Markič; Slovenia |
| 100 m breaststroke | Oleg Lisogor; Ukraine | Hugues Duboscq; France | Richárd Bodor; Hungary |
| 200 m breaststroke | Paolo Bossini; Italy | Dmitry Komornikov; Russia | Richárd Bodor; Hungary |
| 50 m butterfly | Sergiy Breus; Ukraine | Nikolay Skvortsov; Russia | Andriy Serdinov; Ukraine |
| 100 m butterfly | Andriy Serdinov; Ukraine | Franck Esposito; France | Nikolay Skvortsov; Russia |
| 200 m butterfly | Denys Sylantyev; Ukraine | Ioan Gherghel; Romania | Anatoly Polyakov; Russia |
| 200 m individual medley | Markus Rogan; Austria | Jani Sievinen; Finland | Massimiliano Rosolino; Italy |
| 400 m individual medley | László Cseh; Hungary | Luca Marin; Italy | Alessio Boggiatto; Italy |
| 4 × 100 m freestyle relay | Italy; Lorenzo Vismara; Christian Galenda; Giacomo Vassanelli; Filippo Magnini | Russia; Andrey Kapralov; Yevgeniy Lagunov; Ivan Usov; Denis Pimankov | France; Amaury Leveaux; Germain Cayette; Julien Sicot; Fabien Gilot |
| 4 × 200 m freestyle relay | Italy; Emiliano Brembilla; Matteo Pelliciari; Massimiliano Rosolino; Filippo Magnini | Russia; Maxim Kuznetsov; Yevgeniy Natsvin; Andrey Kapralov; Yuri Prilukov | France; Fabien Horth; Nicolas Kintz; Nicolas Rostoucher; Amaury Leveaux |
| 4 × 100 m medley relay | Ukraine; Volodymyr Nikolaychuk; Oleg Lisogor; Andriy Serdinov; Yuriy Yegoshyn | France; Simon Dufour; Hugues Duboscq; Franck Esposito; Julien Sicot | Hungary; László Cseh; Richárd Bodor; Zsolt Gáspár; Attila Zubor |

=== Women's events ===
| Event | Gold | Silver | Bronze |
|---|---|---|---|
| 50 m freestyle | Therese Alshammar; Sweden | Svitlana Khakhlova; Belarus | Sandra Völker; Germany |
| 100 m freestyle | Malia Metella; France | Marleen Veldhuis; Netherlands | Nery Mantey Niangkouara; Greece |
| 200 m freestyle | Camelia Potec; Romania | Solenne Figuès; France | Josefin Lillhage; Sweden |
| 400 m freestyle | Laure Manaudou; France | Camelia Potec; Romania | Yana Klochkova; Ukraine |
| 800 m freestyle | Erika Villaecija; Spain | Anja Čarman; Slovenia | Camelia Potec; Romania |
| 50 m backstroke | Ilona Hlaváčková; Czech Republic | Nina Zhivanevskaya; Spain | Alessandra Cappa; Italy |
| 100 m backstroke | Laure Manaudou; France | Stanislava Komarova; Russia | Nina Zhivanevskaya; Spain |
| 200 m backstroke | Stanislava Komarova; Russia | Anja Čarman; Slovenia | Sanja Jovanović; Croatia |
| 50 m breaststroke | Maria Östling; Sweden | Elena Bogomazova; Russia | Majken Thorup; Denmark |
| 100 m breaststroke | Svitlana Bondarenko; Ukraine | Elena Bogomazova; Russia | Mirna Jukić; Austria; Maria Östling; Sweden |
| 200 m breaststroke | Mirna Jukić; Austria | Alenka Kejžar; Slovenia | Elena Bogomazova; Russia |
| 50 m butterfly | Natalya Sutyagina; Russia | Martina Moravcová; Slovakia | Chantal Groot; Netherlands |
| 100 m butterfly | Martina Moravcová; Slovakia | Malia Metella; France | Otylia Jędrzejczak; Poland |
| 200 m butterfly | Otylia Jędrzejczak; Poland | Paola Cavallino; Italy | Mette Jacobsen; Denmark |
| 200 m individual medley | Yana Klochkova; Ukraine | Hanna Shcherba; Belarus | Beatrice Câșlaru; Romania |
| 400 m individual medley | Yana Klochkova; Ukraine | Éva Risztov; Hungary | Anja Klinar; Slovenia |
| 4 × 100 m freestyle relay | France; Solenne Figuès; Céline Couderc; Aurore Mongel; Malia Metella | Netherlands; Chantal Groot; Inge Dekker; Annabel Kosten; Marleen Veldhuis | Sweden; Johanna Sjöberg; Gabriella Fagundez; Cathrin Carlzon; Josefin Lillhage |
| 4 × 200 m freestyle relay | Spain; Tatiana Rouba; Melissa Caballero; Laura Roca; Erika Villaecija | France; Céline Couderc; Katarin Quelennec; Elsa N'Guessan; Solenne Figuès | Romania; Camelia Potec; Larisa Lăcustă; Beatrice Câșlaru; Simona Păduraru |
| 4 × 100 m medley relay | France; Laure Manaudou; Laurie Thomassin; Aurore Mongel; Malia Metella | Ukraine; Iryna Amshennikova; Svitlana Bondarenko; Yana Klochkova; Olga Mukomol | Netherlands; Stefanie Luiken; Madelon Baans; Chantal Groot; Marleen Veldhuis |

== Open water swimming ==
=== Men's events ===
| Event | Gold | Silver | Bronze |
|---|---|---|---|
| 5 km open water | Fabio Venturini (ITA) | Alan Bircher (GBR) | Stefano Rubaudo (ITA) |
| 10 km open water | Yevgeniy Kochkarov (RUS) | Massimiliano Parla (ITA) | Anton Sanachev (RUS) |
| 25 km open water | Yevgeniy Kochkarov (RUS) | David Meca (ESP) | Petar Stoychev (BUL) |

=== Women's events ===
| Event | Gold | Silver | Bronze |
|---|---|---|---|
| 5 km open water | Britta Kamrau (GER) | Stefanie Biller (GER) | Xenia López (ESP) |
| 10 km open water | Britta Kamrau (GER) | Marta Nogues (ESP) | Angela Maurer (GER) |
| 25 km open water | Britta Kamrau (GER) | Natalia Pankina (RUS) | Ivanka Moralieva (BUL) |

== Diving ==
=== Men's events ===
| Event | Gold | Silver | Bronze |
|---|---|---|---|
| 1 m springboard | Joona Puhakka; Finland | Nicola Marconi; Italy | Tobias Schellenberg; Germany |
| 3 m springboard | Andreas Wels; Germany | Joona Puhakka; Finland | Vassiliy Lisovskiy; Russia |
| 10 m platform | Anton Zakharov; Ukraine | Heiko Meyer; Germany | Roman Volodkov; Ukraine |
| 3 m springboard synchro | Nicola Marconi; Tommaso Marconi; Italy | Sergey Anikin; Vassiliy Lisovskiy; Russia | Dmytro Lysenko; Yuriy Shlyakhov; Ukraine |
| 10 m platform synchro | Anton Zakharov; Roman Volodkov; Ukraine | Tony Adam; Heiko Meyer; Germany; Oleg Vikulov; Konstantin Khanbekov; Russia | none |

=== Women's events ===
| Event | Gold | Silver | Bronze |
|---|---|---|---|
| 1 m springboard | Heike Fischer; Germany | Natalya Umyskova; Russia | Tania Cagnotto; Italy |
| 3 m springboard | Yuliya Pakhalina; Russia | Vera Ilyina; Russia | Olena Fedorova; Ukraine |
| 10 m platform | Tania Cagnotto; Italy | Olena Zhupina; Ukraine | Valentina Marocchi; Italy |
| 3 m springboard synchro | Vera Ilyina; Yuliya Pakhalina; Russia | Ditte Kotzian; Conny Schmalfuß; Germany | Olena Fedorova; Kristina Ishchenko; Ukraine |
| 10 m platform synchro | Nora Subschinski; Annett Gamm; Germany | Dolores Saez de Ibarra; Leire Santos; Spain | Brenda Spaziani; Valentina Marocchi; Italy |

== Synchronized swimming ==
| Event | Gold | Silver | Bronze |
|---|---|---|---|
| Solo | Virginie Dedieu; France | Natalia Ishchenko; Russia | Gemma Mengual; Spain |
| Duet | Anastasia Davydova; Anastasiya Yermakova; Russia | Gemma Mengual; Paola Tirados; Spain | Virginie Dedieu; Laure Thibaud; France |
| Team | Russia; Olga Brusnikina; Anastasia Davydova; Anastasia Ermakova; Maria Gromova; Elvira Khasyanova; Maria Kiseleva; Olga Novokshchenova; Anna Shorina | Spain; Raquel Corral; Tina Fuentes; Andrea Fuentes; Ana Montero; Gisela Moron; Irina Rodriguez; Alicia Sanz; Ione Serrano | Italy; Monica Cirulli; Costanza Fiorentini; Joey Paccagnella; Elisa Plaisant; Beatrice Spaziani; Federica Stefanelli; Lorena Zaffalon; Laura Zanazza |
| Combination | Spain; Raquel Corral; Andrea Fuentes; Tina Fuentes; Gemma Mengual; Ana Montero; Gisela Moron; Irina Rodriguez; Alicia Sanz; Ione Serrano; Paola Tirados | Italy; Monica Cirulli; Costanza Fiorentini; Francesca Gangemi; Joey Paccagnella; Elisa Plaisant; Sara Savoia; Beatrice Spaziani; Federica Stefanelli; Lorena Zaffalon; Laura Zanazza | Greece; Maria Christodoulou; Eleftheria Ftouli; Eleni Georgiou; Efrosyni Gouda; Apostolia Ioannou; Eirini Iordanopoulou; Evgenia Koutsoudi; Evanthia Makrygianni; Olga Pelekanou; Christina Thalassinidou |
