= Joey Paccagnella =

Italian synchronized swimmer

Personal information
- Born: 10 January 1981 (age 45) Dolo, Italy

Sport
- Sport: Synchronised swimming
Medal record
Representing Italy
European Championships
Silver medal – second place	2004 Madrid	Team, free routine
Bronze medal – third place	2002 Berlin	Team
Bronze medal – third place	2004 Madrid	Team, free

Joey Paccagnella (born 10 January 1981) is an Italian female synchronized swimmer who competed in the 2004 Summer Olympics.
