= Giovanni Menchi =

Italian equestrian

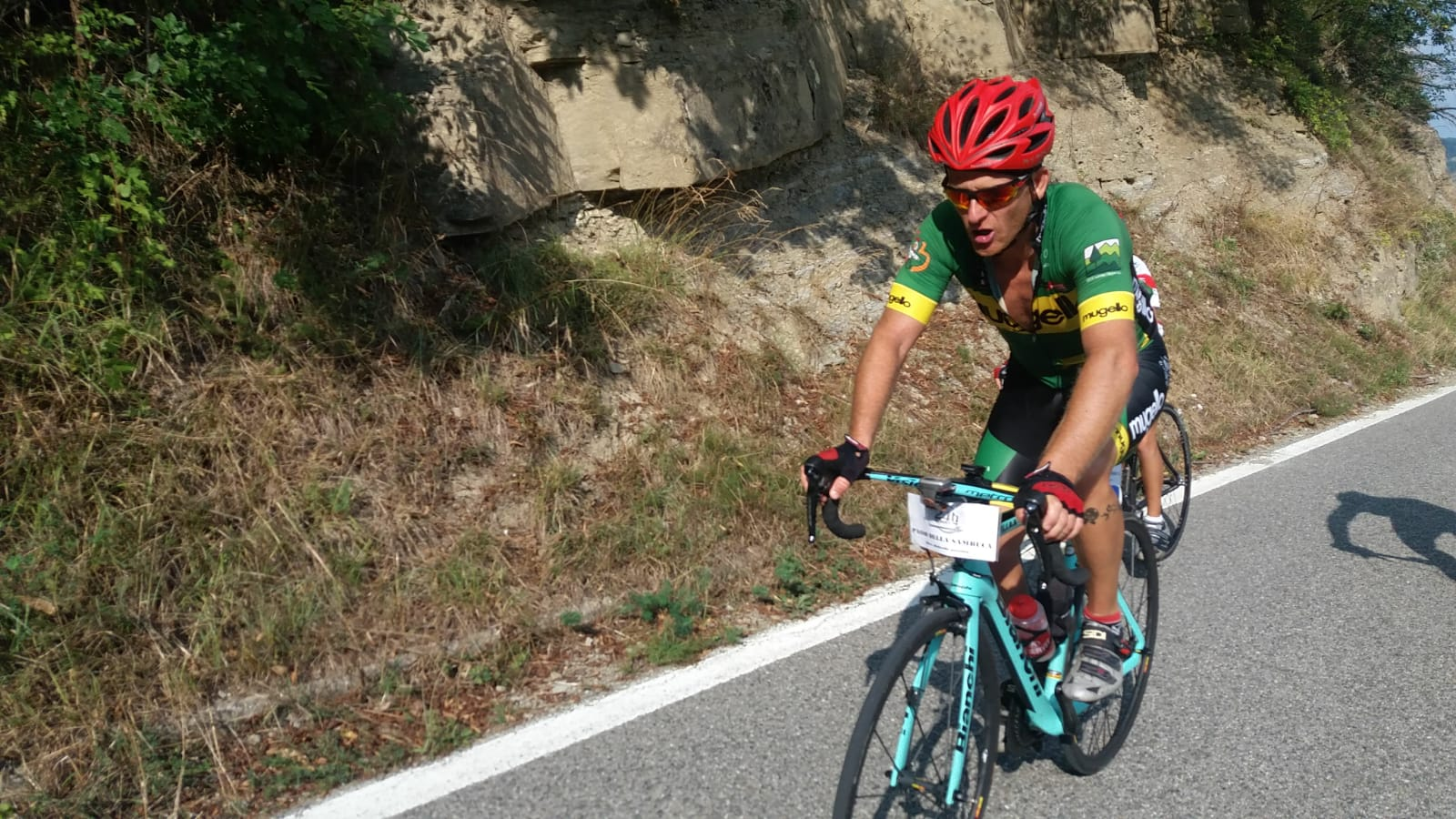

Personal information
- Nationality: Italian
- Born: 25 October 1975 (age 49); Florence, Italy

Sport
- Sport: Equestrian

Giovanni Menchi (born 25 October 1975) is an Italian equestrian. He competed in two events at the 2004 Summer Olympics.
