= Costanza Fiorentini =

Italian synchronized swimmer

Personal information
- Born: 25 November 1984 (age 41) Rome, Italy

Sport
- Sport: Synchronised swimming
Medal record
Representing Italy
European Championships
Silver medal – second place	2004 Madrid	Team, free routine
Silver medal – second place	2008 Eindhoven	Team, free
Silver medal – second place	2008 Eindhoven	Team, free routine
Bronze medal – third place	2004 Madrid	Team, free

Costanza Fiorentini (born 25 November 1984) is an Italian synchronized swimmer who competed in the 2004 Summer Olympics.
