= Giacomo Vassanelli =

Italian swimmer (born 1983)

Medal record

Representing Italy

Men's swimming

European Championships (LC)
Gold medal – first place	2004 Madrid	4×100 m freestyle

Giacomo Vassanelli (born 5 May 1983 in Verona) is a freestyle swimmer from Italy, who won the gold medal in the men's 4×100 metres freestyle event at the 2004 European Championships. He represented his native country a couple of months later at the 2004 Summer Olympics in Athens, Greece.
