= Sara Savoia =

Italian synchronized swimmer

Personal information
- Born: 12 July 1985 (age 40) Verona, Italy

Sport
- Sport: Synchronised swimming
Medal record
Representing Italy
European Championships
| Silver medal – second place | 2004 Madrid | Team, free routine |

Sara Savoia (born 12 July 1985) is an Italian synchronized swimmer who competed in the 2004 Summer Olympics.
