= Peter Nyari =

Italian baseball player (born 1971)

- Relief pitcher
- Born: 4 September 1971 (age 55); Erie, Pennsylvania, U.S.
- Bats: Right Throws: Right

Peter Ernie Nyari (born 7 September 1971) is an Italian former professional baseball player who competed in the 2004 Summer Olympics.
