= Anthony Massimino =

Italian baseball player (born 1979)

Anthony Massimino (born 20 August 1979) is an Italian baseball player who competed in the 2004 Summer Olympics.
