= Royal Spanish Swimming Federation =

Spain's national aquatics federation

Royal Spanish Swimming Federation Real Federación Española de Natación
- Sport: Water polo, swimming, synchronized swimming, diving, open water swimming
- Abbreviation: RFEN
- Founded: 1920
- Affiliation: International Swimming Federation (FINA); European Swimming League (LEN)
- Headquarters: Madrid, Spain
- Location: M86 Swimming Center
- President: Fernando Carpena Pérez

Official website
- www.rfen.es
- (Spain)

The Royal Spanish Swimming Federation (Spanish: Real Federación Española de Natación - RFEN) founded in 1920, is the aquatics national federation for Spain. It oversees competition in the 5 aquatics disciplines (swimming, diving, open water swimming, synchronized swimming and water polo) and Masters competition in these. As of 2023, the federation has 790 registered clubs and 66,766 federated swimmers.

It is affiliated to:

- FINA, which oversees international swimming;
- LEN, which oversees swimming in Europe;
- COE, the Spanish Olympic Committee

== See also ==
- Spain men's national water polo team
- Spain women's national water polo team
