= Erin White (softball) =

Canadian softball player

Personal information
- Nationality: Canadian
- Born: October 27, 1977 (age 48) Vancouver, British Columbia
- Education: Iowa State University

Sport
- Sport: Softball

Erin (Woods) White (born October 27, 1977) is a Canadian softball first baseman. She is a graduate of Iowa State University, where she played catcher and at one point held the school's career home run record. She was a member of the Canadian Softball team that finished 5th at the 2004 Summer Olympics. She now coaches softball at Solon High School in Solon, Iowa. Her Solon team won the 2007, Division 2A Iowa Girls High School Athletic Union State Title. Her husband, Jim White, after coaching at cross town rival CCA, made the move to Solon as the head softball coach.
