= Lorena Zaffalon =

Italian synchronized swimmer

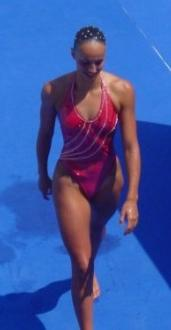
- Zaffalon in 2003

Personal information
- Born: 10 August 1981 (age 44) Milan, Italy

Sport
- Sport: Synchronised swimming
Medal record
Representing Italy
European Championships
Silver medal – second place	2004 Madrid	Team, free routine
Bronze medal – third place	2002 Berlin	Team
Bronze medal – third place	2004 Madrid	Team, free

Lorena Zaffalon (born 10 August 1981 in Milan) is an Italian synchronised swimmer. In the 2004 Summer Olympics, held in Athens, Greece, she came seventh in the Women's Team competition and eighth in the Women's Duet competition (alongside Beatrice Spaziani).

As part of the Italian team, she won bronze at the 2002 European Aquatics Championships in Berlin and silver at the 2004 European Aquatics Championships in Madrid.
