= David Rollandini =

American baseball player (born 1979)

- Relief pitcher
- Born: 6 February 1979 (age 47); Springfield, Virginia, U.S.
- Bats: Right Throws: Right
- Stats at Baseball Reference

David Hale Rollandini (born 6 February 1979) is an American-Italian former professional baseball pitcher. He was born in Springfield, Virginia and attended college at Oklahoma State University. He signed as an amateur free agent with the Philadelphia Phillies in 2001. He played in the Frontier League and Atlantic League in 2002 and 2003, and played in the 2004 Summer Olympics. In 2006, he signed with the Houston Astros and played for the Corpus Christi Hooks, his last season in professional baseball.
