= Monica Cirulli =

Italian synchronized swimmer

Personal information
- Born: 2 January 1982 (age 44) Rome, Italy

Sport
- Sport: Synchronised swimming
Medal record
Representing Italy
European Championships
Silver medal – second place	2004 Madrid	Team, free routine
Bronze medal – third place	2002 Berlin	Team
Bronze medal – third place	2004 Madrid	Team

Monica Cirulli (born 2 January 1982) is an Italian synchronized swimmer who competed in the 2004 Summer Olympics.
