= Laurie Thomassin =

French swimmer

Personal information
- Born: 2 July 1978 (age 48) Nîmes, France
- Height: 1.66 m (5 ft 5 in)
- Weight: 54 kg (119 lb)

Sport
- Club: Aix Natation, Aix-en-Provence
Medal record
Women's swimming
Representing France
European Championships
| Gold medal – first place | 2004 Madrid | 4×100 m medley |

Laurie Thomassin (French pronunciation: [lɔʁi tɔmasɛ̃]; born 2 July 1978) is a French retired breaststroke swimmer who won a gold medal in the 4×100 m medley relay at the 2004 European Aquatics Championships. She also competed in the same event at the 2004 Summer Olympics.

More than one French sportswoman carries the name Laurie Thomassin: a pentathlon athlete Laurie Thomassin (b. 1986), and a younger swimmer who won a bronze medal in the 200 m breaststroke at the 12th Gymnasiade in 2002 (i.e. born after 1985).
