= Laura Zanazza =

Italian synchronized swimmer

Personal information
- Born: 29 July 1982 (age 43) Angera, Italy

Sport
- Sport: Synchronised swimming
Medal record
Representing Italy
European Championships
Silver medal – second place	2004 Madrid	Team, free routine
Bronze medal – third place	2002 Berlin	Team
Bronze medal – third place	2004 Madrid	Team, free

Laura Zanazza (born 29 July 1982) is an Italian synchronized swimmer who competed in the 2004 Summer Olympics.
