= Leslie Malerich =

Italian softball player (born 1980)

Leslie Malerich (born 29 February 1980) is an Italian-American former collegiate and Olympic softball pitcher and coach originally from Merrillville, Indiana. She attended and played for the Florida State Seminoles from 1999 to 2002 and is the school's career leader in innings pitched in the Atlantic Coast Conference, where she was named the 2001 player of the year. She also competed for Italy in the 2004 Summer Olympics.

== FSU Seminoles ==
Malerich was named a three-time All-Conference 2000–02. She was named Player of The Year in 2001 and earned National Fastpitch Coaches Association Third Team All-American. Malerich led the Seminoles to the 2002 Women's College World Series and pitched her last game on May 26, 2002, tossing 5 innings with 5 strikeouts in a loss to the Arizona Wildcats.

== Statistics ==
=== FSU Seminoles ===
YEAR	W	L	GP	GS	CG	Sh	SV	IP	H	R	ER	BB	SO	ERA	WHIP
1999	11	8	32	19	12	4	0	145.0	117	62	42	34	93	2.03	1.04
2000	35	15	58	41	37	16	2	323.0	222	84	56	72	243	1.21	0.91
2001	26	3	34	30	25	13	0	205.1	119	32	21	55	160	0.71	0.85
2002	35	14	55	42	36	12	4	315.1	244	88	62	115	255	1.37	1.14
TOTALS	107	40	179	132	110	45	6	988.2	702	266	181	276	751	1.28	0.99
