= Beatrice Spaziani =

Italian synchronized swimmer

Personal information
- Born: 26 March 1984 (age 42) Terracina, Italy

Sport
- Sport: Synchronised swimming
Medal record
Representing Italy
European Championships
Silver medal – second place	2004 Madrid	Team, free routine
Bronze medal – third place	2002 Berlin	Team
Bronze medal – third place	2004 Madrid	Team, free

Beatrice Spaziani (born 26 March 1984) is an Italian synchronised swimmer. In the 2004 Summer Olympics, held in Athens, Greece, she came seventh in the Women's Team competition and eighth in the Women's Duet competition (alongside Lorena Zaffalon).
