= Samanta Bardini =

Italian softball player (born 1977)

Samanta Bardini (born 27 February 1977) is an Italian softball player who competed in the 2004 Summer Olympics.
