= Eva Trevisan =

Italian softball player (born 1980)

Personal information
- Born: 21 April 1980 (age 46) Gorizia, Italy
- Height: 1.66 m (5 ft 5 1/2 in)
- Weight: 58 kg (128 lb)

Sport
- Country: Italy
- Sport: Softball
- Event: Women's team
- Club: Blue Girls Bologna
Medal record
European Championship
Gold medal – first place	1997 Prague
Gold medal – first place	2001 Prague
Gold medal – first place	2003 Saronno
Silver medal – second place	2011 Ronchi dei Legionari
Gold medal – first place	2015 Rosmalen

Eva Trevisan (born 21 April 1980 in Gorizia) is an Italian softball player.

== Biography ==
Eva Trevisan has a participation in the Olympic Games in Athens 2004. She's the captain of the Italy women's national softball team.

== Palmarès ==
- 3 wins at the ESF Women's Championship, (1997, 2001, 2003)
- 4 wins at the ESF European Cup Women, (1999, 2000, 2001, 2015)
