= Stefania Vitaliani =

Italian softball player (born 1975)

Stefania Vitaliani (born 16 July 1975) is an Italian softball player who competed in the 2004 Summer Olympics.
