= Nicole Di Salvio =

Italian softball player (born 1979)

Nicole Di Salvio (born 23 November 1979) is an Italian softball player who competed in the 2000 Summer Olympics and in the 2004 Summer Olympics. She is a pitching coach, working alongside Coach Dawn Castañeda, who teaches batting for softball players. She works in TCH2HIT in Upland CA.
