= Natalia Cimin =

Italian softball player (born 1979)

Natalia Cimin (born 31 July 1979) is an Italian softball player who competed in the 2004 Summer Olympics.
