= Francesca Francolini =

Italian softball player (born 1979)

Francesca Francolini (born 27 December 1979) is an Italian softball player who competed in the 2000 Summer Olympics and in the 2004 Summer Olympics.
