= Daniela Castellani =

Italian softball player (born 1975)

Daniela Castellani (born 30 June 1975) is an Italian softball player who competed in the 2000 Summer Olympics and in the 2004 Summer Olympics.

She is a member of the Executive Board of the European Softball Federation since the election at the joint ESF-CEB congress in Belgrade in 2016.
