= Ilaria Pino =

Italian softball player (born 1983)

Ilaria Pino (born 18 February 1983) is an Italian softball player who competed in the 2004 Summer Olympics.
