= Annalisa Turci =

Italian softball player (born 1976)

Annalisa Turci (born 26 September 1976) is an Italian softball player who competed in the 2004 Summer Olympics.
