= Sabrina Del Mastio =

Italian softball player (born 1971)

Sabrina Del Mastio (born 10 March 1971) is an Italian softball player who competed in the 2004 Summer Olympics.
