= Jennifer Spediacci =

Italian softball player (born 1978)

Jennifer Ann Spediacci (born 5 April 1978) is an Italian-American, former collegiate All-American, 2004 Olympian, right-handed batting softball pitcher, originally from Fremont, California. She was a student athlete for the Washington Huskies from 1997 to 1900 in the Pac-12 Conference, competing in four Women's College World Series and holding the school ERA record. She also who competed in the 2004 Summer Olympics.

== College ==
Spediacci was a Second Team All-Pac-12 as a freshman and a three-time First Team in her other years. She was named Pitcher of the Year in 2000. Spediacci was also a two-time National Fastpitch Coaches All-American for both the Second Team in 1998 and First Team as a senior. She led the Huskies to four straight college World Series and a national runner up finish in the 1999 Women's College World Series and a No. 1 ranking in 2000. As a senior, Spediacci struck out a career best 18 batters in a win against the Oregon State Beavers on May 13. She also won her 100th game on May 25 against the DePaul Blue Demons at that year's World Series.

Spediacci's career record at the World Series includes: going 7–2 with 57 strikeouts in 61.1 innings, surrendering 34 hits, 14 earned runs, 10 walks for a 1.60 ERA and 0.72 WHIP. She also contributed 4 hits, 5 walks and an RBI at the plate.

== Statistics ==
=== Washington Huskies ===
YEAR	W	L	GP	GS	CG	SHO	SV	IP	H	R	ER	BB	SO	ERA	WHIP
1997	15	7	32	23	10	5	2	139.0	125	55	39	43	116	1.96	1.21
1998	27	6	41	31	23	8	2	213.1	127	46	35	37	212	1.15	0.77
1999	24	9	41	34	20	11	1	226.1	112	50	32	44	250	0.99	0.69
2000	34	5	45	36	27	16	1	241.1	135	30	23	53	316	0.67	0.78
TOTALS	100	27	159	124	80	40	6	820.0	499	181	129	177	894	1.10	0.82

YEAR	G	AB	R	H	BA	RBI	HR	3B	2B	TB	SLG	BB	SO	SB	SBA
1997	42	97	7	27	.278	11	0	1	4	33	.340%	10	18	2	3
1998	54	125	18	37	.296	23	0	2	8	49	.392%	20	13	7	7
1999	61	146	23	45	.308	27	4	2	9	70	.479%	32	19	6	10
2000	48	115	18	34	.295	31	6	2	3	59	.513%	18	22	4	5
TOTALS	205	483	66	143	.296	92	10	7	24	211	.437%	80	72	19	25
