= Marta Gambella =

Italian softball player (born 1974)

Marta Gambella (born 7 June 1974) is an Italian softball player who competed in the 2000 Summer Olympics and in the 2004 Summer Olympics.
