= Susan Bugliarello =

Italian softball player (born 1975)

Susan Bugliarello (born 18 October 1975) is an Italian softball player who competed in the 2000 Summer Olympics and in the 2004 Summer Olympics.
