= Natalie Anter =

Italian softball player (born 1980)

Personal information
- Nationality: Italian
- Born: April 6, 1980 (age 44); Upland, California

Sport
- Country: Italy
- Sport: Softball
- Event: Women's team

Natalie Anter (born 6 April 1980) is an Italian softball player who competed in the 2004 Summer Olympics.

She played for the North Carolina Tar Heels.
