= Nigeria at the 2028 Summer Olympics =

- IOC code: NGR
- NOC: Nigeria Olympic Committee
- Website: nigeriaolympic.org

in Los Angeles, United States 14 July 2028 – 30 July 2028
- Competitors: 2 in 1 sport
- Medals: Gold 0 Silver 0 Bronze 0 Total 0

Summer Olympics appearances (overview)
- 1952; 1956; 1960; 1964; 1968; 1972; 1976; 1980; 1984; 1988; 1992; 1996; 2000; 2004; 2008; 2012; 2016; 2020; 2024; 2028

Nigeria is scheduled to compete at the 2028 Summer Olympics in Los Angeles, from 14 to 30 July 2028. Since making its Olympic debut at Helsinki 1952, Nigeria has participated in every Summer Olympics except Montreal 1976, which it boycotted.

== Competitors ==
The following is the list of number of competitors in the Games.

Sport	Men	Women	Total
Volleyball	0	2	2
Total	0	2	2

== Volleyball ==
=== Beach ===
Nigerian women's pairs secured qualification for the Games by winning gold and claiming the only available women's pairs quota at the 2026 African Beach Volleyball Championships in Alexandria, Egypt.

Athletes	Event	Preliminary round				Round of 16	Quarterfinal	Semifinal	Final / BM	
Athletes	Event	Opposition Score	Opposition Score	Opposition Score	Rank	Opposition Score	Opposition Score	Opposition Score	Opposition Score	Rank
	Women's									
