= Nigeria at the 1984 Summer Olympics =

- IOC code: NGR
- NOC: Nigeria Olympic Committee

in Los Angeles
- Competitors: 32 (30 men and 2 women) in 5 sports
- Flag bearer: Yusuf Alli
- Medals Ranked 30th: Gold 0 Silver 1 Bronze 1 Total 2

Summer Olympics appearances (overview)
- 1952; 1956; 1960; 1964; 1968; 1972; 1976; 1980; 1984; 1988; 1992; 1996; 2000; 2004; 2008; 2012; 2016; 2020; 2024; 2028

Nigeria was represented at the 1984 Summer Olympics in Los Angeles, California, United States by the Nigeria Olympic Committee.

In total, 32 athletes including 30 men and 2 women represented Nigeria in four different sports including athletics, boxing, weightlifting and wrestling.

Nigeria won a total of two medals at the games after Peter Konyegwachie claimed silver in the boxing featherweight category and the men's team won bronze in the 4 × 400 m relay.

== Background ==
The Nigeria Olympic Committee was founded in 1951 and Nigeria made their Olympic debut at the 1952 Summer Olympics in Helsinki, Finland. They had participated in every subsequent Olympics except the 1976 Summer Olympics in Montreal, Quebec, Canada after taking part in the African boycott. The 1984 Summer Olympics in Los Angeles, California, United States marked their eighth appearance at the Olympics.

== Competitors ==
In total, 32 athletes represented Nigeria at the 1984 Summer Olympics in Los Angeles, California, United States across four different sports.

Sport	Men	Women	Total
Athletics	16	2	18
Boxing	6	—	6
Weightlifting	6	—	6
Wrestling	3	—	3
Total	30	2	32

== Medalists ==
Nigeria won a total of two medals at the games after Peter Konyegwachie claimed silver in the boxing featherweight category and the men's team won bronze in the 4 × 400 m relay.

Medal	Name	Sport	Event	Date
Silver	Peter Konyegwachie	Boxing	Featherweight	11 August
Bronze	Innocent Egbunike; Rotimi Peters; Moses Ugbisien; Sunday Uti	Athletics	Men's 4 × 400 metres relay	11 August

== Athletics ==
In total, 18 Nigerian athletes participated in the athletics events – Chidi Imoh in the men's 100 m and the men's 4 × 100 metres relay, Sunday Uti and Innocent Egbunike in the men's 400 m and the men's 4 × 400 metres relay, Henry Amike in the men's 400 m hurdles, Lawrence Adegbeingbe, Isiaq Adeyanju, Eseme Ikpoto and Samson Oyeledun in the men's 4 × 100 metres relay, Rotimi Peters and Moses Ugbisien in the men's 4 × 400 metres relay, Yusuf Alli and Jubobaraye Kio in the men's long jump, Ajayi Agbebaku, Paul Emordi and Joseph Taiwo in the men's triple jump, Ifeoma Mbanugo in the women's marathon and Maria Usifo in the women's 100 m hurdles and the women's 400 m hurdles.

== Boxing ==
In total, six Nigerian athletes participated in the boxing events – Peter Konyegwachie in the featherweight category, Charles Nwokolo in the light welterweight category, Jerry Okorodudu in the middleweight category, Roland Omoruyi in the welterweight category, Joe Orewa in the bantamweight category and Christopher Ossai in the lightweight category.

== Weightlifting ==
In total, six Nigerian athletes participated in the weightlifting events – Ironbar Bassey and Batholomew Oluoma in the +110 kg category, Patrick Bassey in the –67.5 kg category,Lawrence Iquaibom in the –60 kg category, Oliver Orok in the –100 kg category and Emmanuel Oshomah in the –90 kg category.

== Wrestling ==
In total, three Nigerian athletes participated in the weightlifting events – Kally Agogo in the freestyle –82 kg category, Macauley Appah in the freestyle –90 kg category and Seidu Olawale in the freestyle –74 kg category.

== See also ==
- Nigeria at the 1982 Commonwealth Games
- Nigeria at the 1986 Commonwealth Games
