= 2023 African Boxing Olympic Qualification Tournament =

Boxing competitions

- Location: Dakar, Senegal
- Dates: 9–15 September
- Competitors: 235 from 42 nations

The 2023 African Boxing Olympic Qualification Tournament for the boxing tournament at the 2024 Summer Olympics in Paris, France was held in Dakar, Senegal from 9 to 15 September 2023.

== Medalists ==
=== Men ===
Event	Gold	Silver	Bronze
−51 kg	Patrick Chinyemba (ZAM)	Ala Eddine Zidi (TUN)	Said Mortaji (MAR)
−51 kg	Patrick Chinyemba (ZAM)	Ala Eddine Zidi (TUN)	Theophilus Allotey (GHA)
−57 kg	Dolapo Omole (NGR)	Fikremariyam Leta (ETH)	Alain Sangue (CMR)
−57 kg	Dolapo Omole (NGR)	Fikremariyam Leta (ETH)	Hichem Maouche (ALG)
−63.5 kg	Jugurtha Ait Bekka (ALG)	Richarno Colin (MRI)	John Masamba (RSA)
−63.5 kg	Jugurtha Ait Bekka (ALG)	Richarno Colin (MRI)	Joshua Tukamuhebwa (UGA)
−71 kg	Omar Elawady (EGY)	Steve Kulenguluka Mbiya (COD)	Bruno Fernandes (CPV)
−71 kg	Omar Elawady (EGY)	Steve Kulenguluka Mbiya (COD)	Arena Pakela (LES)
−80 kg	Abdelrahman Oraby (EGY)	Yusuf Changalawe (TAN)	Gebhard Ipinge (NAM)
−80 kg	Abdelrahman Oraby (EGY)	Yusuf Changalawe (TAN)	Younes Nemouchi (ALG)
−92 kg	Olaitan Olaore (NGR)	Mohammed Houmri (ALG)	Ayoub Maanni (MAR)
−92 kg	Olaitan Olaore (NGR)	Mohammed Houmri (ALG)	Albino Gabriel (MOZ)
+92 kg	Mourad Kadi (ALG)	Diarga Baldé (SEN)	Keddy Agnes (SEY)
+92 kg	Mourad Kadi (ALG)	Diarga Baldé (SEN)	Mohamed Firisse (MAR)

=== Women ===
Event	Gold	Silver	Bronze
−50 kg	Roumaysa Boualam (ALG)	Yasmine Mouttaki (MAR)	Adeola Oyesiji (NGR)
−50 kg	Roumaysa Boualam (ALG)	Yasmine Mouttaki (MAR)	Benedicte Diyoka (COD)
−54 kg	Widad Bertal (MAR)	Yomna Ayyad (EGY)	Sara Haghighat-Joo (SLE)
−54 kg	Widad Bertal (MAR)	Yomna Ayyad (EGY)	Fatma Abdelkader (ALG)
−57 kg	Khouloud Hlimi (TUN)	Marcelat Sakobi Matshu (COD)	Mariatou Diallo (SEN)
−57 kg	Khouloud Hlimi (TUN)	Marcelat Sakobi Matshu (COD)	Joy Ojo Nene (NGR)
−60 kg	Cynthia Ogunsemilore (NGR)	Hadjila Khelif (ALG)	Felistars Nkandu (ZAM)
−60 kg	Cynthia Ogunsemilore (NGR)	Hadjila Khelif (ALG)	Mariam Sidibé (CIV)
−66 kg	Imane Khelif (ALG)	Alcinda Panguana (MOZ)	Mireille Bindzi (CMR)
−66 kg	Imane Khelif (ALG)	Alcinda Panguana (MOZ)	Brigitte Mbabi Tsheusi (COD)
−75 kg	Khadija El-Mardi (MAR)	Elizabeth Andiego (KEN)	Patricia Mbata (NGR)
−75 kg	Khadija El-Mardi (MAR)	Elizabeth Andiego (KEN)	Molka Ben Mabrouk (TUN)

== Qualification summary ==
NOC	Men							Women						Total
NOC	51	57	63.5	71	80	92	+92	50	54	57	60	66	75	Total
Algeria			X				X	X			X	X		5
Democratic Republic of the Congo										X				1
Egypt				X	X				X					3
Morocco								X	X				X	3
Mozambique												X		1
Nigeria		X				X					X			3
Tunisia										X				1
Zambia	X													1
Total:	1	1	1	1	1	1	1	2	2	2	2	2	1	18

== Results ==
=== Men ===
==== Flyweight (51 kg) ====
Preliminaries
	Score	
Lenick Gomes (CPV)	1–4	Mohamed Abdallah (TAN)
Marry Corr (GAM)	WO	Olivier Vlavonou (TOG)
Yassine Issufo (MOZ)	WO	Gloire Kolongo Bakora (COD)
Theophilus Allotey (GHA)	4–1	Fitwi Tumay Nigus (ETH)
David Macharia (KEN)	RSC-1	Thibaut Ngbamdamale (CAF)

Round of 16
Abdallah Emam (EGY)	0
Mohamed Abdallah (TAN)	5
Said Mortaji (MAR)	4
Retselisitsoe Kolobe (LES)	1
Mohamed Moziane (ALG)	5
Olivier Vlavonou (TOG)	0
Yassine Issufo (MOZ)	0
Patrick Chinyemba (ZAM)	5
Sinovuyo Mtintelwa (RSA)	0
Theophilus Allotey (GHA)	5
Fathia Mawanda (UGA)	5
Pape Mamadou Sow (SEN)	0
Ala Eddine Zidi (TUN)	5
Rajab Mahommed (BOT)	0
David Macharia (KEN)	3
Trofimus Johannes (NAM)	2

Quarterfinals
Mohamed Abdallah (TAN)	1
Said Mortaji (MAR)	4
Mohamed Moziane (ALG)	0
Patrick Chinyemba (ZAM)	5
Theophilus Allotey (GHA)	5
Fathia Mawanda (UGA)	0
Ala Eddine Zidi (TUN)	4
David Macharia (KEN)	1

Semifinals
Said Mortaji (MAR)	1
Patrick Chinyemba (ZAM)	4
Theophilus Allotey (GHA)	0
Ala Eddine Zidi (TUN)	5

Final
Patrick Chinyemba (ZAM)	KO-3
Ala Eddine Zidi (TUN)

==== Featherweight (57 kg) ====
Preliminaries
	Score	
Idriss Kitangila Kabwe (COD)	3–2	Salumu Mohamedi (TAN)
George Molwantwa (BOT)	5–0	Power Athanas Omboupiako (CAF)
Yaya Kone (CIV)	0–5	Alain Sangue (CMR)
Elisandro Sanches (CPV)	0–5	Abdourahmane Ndiaye (SEN)
Mwengo Mwale (ZAM)	1–4	Tryagain Ndevelo (NAM)
Abu Kanu (SLE)	RSC-1	Dolapo Omole (NGR)
Amzolele Dyeyi (RSA)	0–5	Abdul Omar (GHA)
Armando Sigauque (MOZ)	5–0	Jonathan Kyobe (UGA)
Fikremariyam Leta (ETH)	RSC-1	Samuel Wairimu (KEN)
Ahmed Alkoum (LBA)	5–0	Mamadou Bah (GUI)
Abdoul Bathily (MLI)	3–2	Amir Kelany (EGY)
Hichem Maouche (ALG)	4–1	Franck Mombey (GAB)
Musa Cham (GAM)	0–5	Mathealira Seholoholo (LES)

Round of 16
Omar Khalifa (TUN)	2
Idriss Kitangila Kabwe (COD)	3
George Molwantwa (BOT)	0
Alain Sangue (CMR)	5
Abdourahmane Ndiaye (SEN)	0
Tryagain Ndevelo (NAM)	5
Dolapo Omole (NGR)	5
Abdul Omar (GHA)	0
Soulaimane Samghouli (MAR)	2
Armando Sigauque (MOZ)	3
Fikremariyam Leta (ETH)	DSQ-2
Ahmed Alkoum (LBA)
Abdoul Bathily (MLI)	1
Hichem Maouche (ALG)	4
Mathealira Seholoholo (LES)	5
Zweli Dlamini (SWZ)	0

Quarterfinals
Idriss Kitangila Kabwe (COD)	2
Alain Sangue (CMR)	3
Tryagain Ndevelo (NAM)
Dolapo Omole (NGR)	RSC-1
Armando Sigauque (MOZ)	0
Fikremariyam Leta (ETH)	5
Hichem Maouche (ALG)	3
Mathealira Seholoholo (LES)	2

Semifinals
Alain Sangue (CMR)	0
Dolapo Omole (NGR)	5
Fikremariyam Leta (ETH)	5
Hichem Maouche (ALG)	0

Final
Dolapo Omole (NGR)	3
Fikremariyam Leta (ETH)	2

==== Light welterweight (63.5 kg) ====
Preliminaries
	Score	
Mehdi Dridi (TUN)	4–1	Thabiso Dlamini (SWZ)
Abrham Gebremariam (ETH)	KO-2	Joshua Tukamuhebwa (UGA)
Henry Lontchedji (BEN)	0–5	Clinton Ndjinga (GAB)
Richarno Colin (MRI)	4–1	Souleymane Diallo (SEN)
Yves Taha (CIV)	RSC-1	David Bireau (CAF)
Salah Alhuwayj (LBA)	2–3	Alseny Sylla (GUI)
Bernardo Marime (MOZ)	2–3	Abdelhaq Nadir (MAR)
Fiston Mbaya Mulumba (COD)	2–3	Joseph Commey (GHA)
Mohamed Sillah (SLE)	RSC-3	Kabo Seitshiro (BOT)
Andrew Chilata (ZAM)	0–5	Jugurtha Ait Bekka (ALG)
John Masamba (RSA)	4–1	Kodjo Yetongnon (TOG)
Monaheng Khebe (LES)	5–0	Ethan Irungu (KEN)
Admilson Moreira (CPV)	5–0	Bakari Diallo (MLI)

Round of 16
Jorgito Ca (GBS)
Mehdi Dridi (TUN)	WO
Joshua Tukamuhebwa (UGA)	RSC-2
Clinton Ndjinga (GAB)
Richarno Colin (MRI)	5
Yves Taha (CIV)	0
Alseny Sylla (GUI)
Abdelhaq Nadir (MAR)	RSC-2
Brice Bassole (BUR)	0
Joseph Commey (GHA)	5
Kabo Seitshiro (BOT)	0
Jugurtha Ait Bekka (ALG)	5
John Masamba (RSA)	RSC-1
Monaheng Khebe (LES)
Admilson Moreira (CPV)	0
Omar Elsayed (EGY)	5

Quarterfinals
Mehdi Dridi (TUN)	0
Joshua Tukamuhebwa (UGA)	5
Richarno Colin (MRI)	3
Abdelhaq Nadir (MAR)	2
Joseph Commey (GHA)	0
Jugurtha Ait Bekka (ALG)	5
John Masamba (RSA)	5
Omar Elsayed (EGY)	0

Semifinals
Joshua Tukamuhebwa (UGA)	1
Richarno Colin (MRI)	4
Jugurtha Ait Bekka (ALG)	5
John Masamba (RSA)	0

Final
Richarno Colin (MRI)	1
Jugurtha Ait Bekka (ALG)	4

==== Light middleweight (71 kg) ====
Preliminaries
	Score	
Stephen Zimba (ZAM)	0–5	Bruno Fernandes (CPV)
Josias Ze Ognane (GAB)	0–5	Albert Mengue (CMR)
Hamza Ghazouani (TUN)	RSC-1	Junior Dassinou (CAF)
Youcef Yaiche (ALG)	KO-2	Omar Elawady (EGY)
Abenezer Esebo (ETH)	1–4	Alphonse Mendy (SEN)
Mohammed Rabii (MAR)	KO-2	Boniface Maina (KEN)
Simnikiwe Bongco (RSA)	3–2	Merven Clair (MRI)
Isaac Ssenyage (UGA)	WO	Malou Deng (SSD)
Alfred Kotey (GHA)	0–5	Tiago Muxanga (MOZ)
Shain Boniface (SEY)	3–2	Sekou Doumbia (CIV)
Moshood Fatai (NGR)	5–0	Raul Obama Mangue (GEQ)

Round of 16
Christian Thomas (SLE)	0
Bruno Fernandes (CPV)	5
Albert Mengue (CMR)	1
Hamza Ghazouani (TUN)	4
Mohammed Saed (LBA)
Omar Elawady (EGY)	RSC-1
Alphonse Mendy (SEN)	4
Armando Bighafa (GBS)	1
Arena Pakela (LES)	4
Boniface Maina (KEN)	1
Simnikiwe Bongco (RSA)	1
Isaac Ssenyange (UGA)	4
Tiago Muxanga (MOZ)	RSC-2
Shain Boniface (SEY)
Moshood Fatai (NGR)	0
Steve Kulenguluka Mbiya (COD)	5

Quarterfinals
Bruno Fernandes (CPV)	4
Hamza Ghazouani (TUN)	1
Omar Elawady (EGY)	5
Alphonse Mendy (SEN)	0
Arena Pakela (LES)	4
Isaac Ssenyange (UGA)	1
Tiago Muxanga (MOZ)	2
Steve Kulenguluka Mbiya (COD)	3

Semifinals
Bruno Fernandes (CPV)	1
Omar Elawady (EGY)	4
Arena Pakela (LES)	0
Steve Kulenguluka Mbiya (COD)	5

Final
Omar Elawady (EGY)	3
Steve Kulenguluka Mbiya (COD)	1

==== Light heavyweight (80 kg) ====
Preliminaries
	Score	
Seydina Konaté (SEN)	4–0	Seth Gyimah (GHA)
Ibrahim Kaba (CIV)	ABD-R2	Younes Nemouchi (ALG)
Abdelrahman Oraby (EGY)	4–1	Youssef Rafrafi (TUN)
Gebhard Ipinge (NAM)	4–1	Peter Pita Kabeji (COD)

Round of 16
Okumu Laweri (SSD)	0
Seydina Konaté (SEN)	5
Yusuf Changalawe (TAN)	3
Anauel Ngamissengue (CGO)	2
Yaya Tessa Kombila (GAB)	5
Ebenezer Zoungrana (BUR)	0
Younes Nemouchi (ALG)	5
Shadiri Bwogi (UGA)	0
Ghislain Ndaye (CAF)
Abdelrahman Oraby (EGY)	RSC-1
Mohamed Assaghir (MAR)	5
Maximiliano Bibang Manana (GEQ)	0
Prewa Padabadi (TOG)	4
Fathi Saad Saad (LBA)	1
Gebhard Ipinge (NAM)	5
Israel Nzewi (CPV)	0

Quarterfinals
Seydina Konaté (SEN)	1
Yusuf Changalawe (TAN)	4
Yaya Tessa Kombila (GAB)	0
Younes Nemouchi (ALG)	5
Abdelrahman Oraby (EGY)	4
Mohamed Assaghir (MAR)	1
Prewa Padabadi (TOG)	1
Gebhard Ipinge (NAM)	4

Semifinals
Yusuf Changalawe (TAN)	RSC-3
Younes Nemouchi (ALG)
Abdelrahman Oraby (EGY)	3
Gebhard Ipinge (NAM)	2

Final
Yusuf Changalawe (TAN)	0
Abdelrahman Oraby (EGY)	5

==== Heavyweight (92 kg) ====
Preliminaries
	Score	
Mohamed Coulibaly (MLI)	5–0	Abdelazim Abdalla (SUD)

Round of 16
Bonginkosi Nhlapho (RSA)	WO
Mohamed Coulibaly (MLI)
Maroy Sadiki (COD)	0
Ayoub Maanni (MAR)	5
Musa Maregesi (TAN)	0
Karamba Kebe (SEN)	5
Olaitan Olaore (NGR)	ABD-1
Bi Marshal Zahouli (CIV)
Peter Alwanga (KEN)	5
Hazem Kandil (EGY)	0
Christ Londji Arignany (GAB)	0
Albino Gabriel (MOZ)	5
Mohammed Houmri (ALG)	4
Mustafa Ifraydhah (LBA)	1
Yann Mansogo Ada (GEQ)	1
Jonathan Tetteh (GHA)	4

Quarterfinals
Bonginkosi Nhlapho (RSA)	0
Ayoub Maanni (MAR)	5
Karamba Kebe (SEN)	0
Olaitan Olaore (NGR)	5
Peter Alwanga (KEN)	2
Albino Gabriel (MOZ)	3
Mohammed Houmri (ALG)	3
Jonathan Tetteh (GHA)	2

Semifinals
Ayoub Maanni (MAR)	0
Olaitan Olaore (NGR)	5
Albino Gabriel (MOZ)	2
Mohammed Houmri (ALG)	3

Final
Olaitan Olaore (NGR)	4
Mohammed Houmri (ALG)	0

==== Super heavyweight (+92 kg) ====
Round of 16
Mourad Kadi (ALG)	RSC-2
David Akankolim (GHA)

Quarterfinals
Zacharie Mvogo Amougou (CMR)
Mourad Kadi (ALG)	RSC-1
Davilson Morais (CPV)
Keddy Agnes (SEY)	RSC-1
Fredrick Ramogi (KEN)
Mohamed Firisse (MAR)	RSC-1
Diarga Baldé (SEN)	RSC-2
Yousry Hafez (EGY)

Semifinals
Mourad Kadi (ALG)	4
Keddy Agnes (SEY)	1
Mohamed Firisse (MAR)	0
Diarga Baldé (SEN)	5

Final
Mourad Kadi (ALG)	4
Diarga Baldé (SEN)	1

=== Women ===
==== Light flyweight (50 kg) ====
Preliminaries
	Score	
Zulfa Macho Yusufu (TAN)	5–0	Grace Nankinga (UGA)
Betelhem Gayiza (ETH)	0–5	Roumaysa Boualam (ALG)
Helena Bagao (MOZ)	0–5	Yasmine Mouttaki (MAR)
Janet Acquah (GHA)	5–0	Veliswa Magaya (SWZ)

Round of 16
Adeola Oyesiji (NGR)	5
Zulfa Macho Yusufu (TAN)	0
Margret Tembo (ZAM)	RSC-1
Dieynaba Diallo (SEN)
Cicilia Hessien (SSD)
Habiba Aly (EGY)	WO
Roumaysa Boualam (ALG)	RSC-1
Ndapandula Ngesheya (NAM)
Thandolwethu Mathiba (RSA)	0
Yasmine Mouttaki (MAR)	5
Wafa Hafsi (TUN)	5
Christine Ongare (KEN)	0
Reine Ngoune (CMR)	5
Grace Fahnbulleh (LBR)	0
Janet Acquah (GHA)
Benedicte Diyoka (COD)	RSC-2

Quarterfinals
Adeola Oyesiji (NGR)	4
Margret Tembo (ZAM)	1
Habiba Aly (EGY)	0
Roumaysa Boualam (ALG)	5
Yasmine Mouttaki (MAR)	5
Wafa Hafsi (TUN)	0
Reine Ngoune (CMR)	1
Benedicte Diyoka (COD)	4

Semifinals
Adeola Oyesiji (NGR)	0
Roumaysa Boualam (ALG)	5
Yasmine Mouttaki (MAR)	5
Benedicte Diyoka (COD)	0

Final
Roumaysa Boualam (ALG)	4
Yasmine Mouttaki (MAR)	1

==== Bantamweight (54 kg) ====
Round of 16
Ornella Havyarimana (BDI)	0
Zainab Adeshina (NGR)	5
Ramatu Quaye (GHA)
Gisele Nyembo Muamba (COD)	RSC-2
Sara Haghighat-Joo (SLE)	5
Amina Martha Faki (KEN)	0
Agerie Emagnu Bayew (ETH)	5
Hildah Ngandwe (ZAM)	0
Yomna Ayyad (EGY)	5
Coletivi Yetongnon (TOG)	0
Chadha Jlassi (TUN)	WO
Maimouna Ndong (SEN)

Quarterfinals
Widad Bertal (MAR)	RSC-3
Zainab Adeshina (NGR)
Gisele Nyembo Muamba (COD)	0
Sara Haghighat-Joo (SLE)	5
Agerie Emagnu Bayew (ETH)	0
Yomna Ayyad (EGY)	5
Chadha Jlassi (TUN)	0
Fatma Abdelkader (ALG)	5

Semifinals
Widad Bertal (MAR)	5
Sara Haghighat-Joo (SLE)	0
Yomna Ayyad (EGY)	4
Fatma Abdelkader (ALG)	1

Final
Widad Bertal (MAR)	5
Yomna Ayyad (EGY)	0

==== Featherweight (57 kg) ====
Round of 16
Phiwokuhle Mnguni (RSA)	5
Anatu Mohammed (GHA)	0
Mariatou Diallo (SEN)	3
Pauline Chege (KEN)	2
Dorine Mambou (CMR)	0
Benilde Macaringue (MOZ)	5
Laela El Ksiri (MAR)	0
Marcelat Sakobi Matshu (COD)	5
Keamogetse Kenosi (BOT)	4
Rawan Elemam (EGY)	1
Chahira Selmouni (ALG)	4
Fatoumata Camara (MLI)	1
Mary Mhango (ZAM)
Joy Ojo Nene (NGR)	RSC-3

Quarterfinals
Khouloud Hlimi (TUN)	RSC-2
Phiwokuhle Mnguni (RSA)
Mariatou Diallo (SEN)	4
Benilde Macaringue (MOZ)	1
Marcelat Sakobi Matshu (COD)	4
Keamogetse Kenosi (BOT)	1
Chahira Selmouni (ALG)
Joy Ojo Nene (NGR)	RSC-3

Semifinals
Khouloud Hlimi (TUN)	RSC-2
Mariatou Diallo (SEN)
Marcelat Sakobi Matshu (COD)	4
Joy Ojo Nene (NGR)	1

Final
Khouloud Hlimi (TUN)	5
Marcelat Sakobi Matshu (COD)	0

==== Lightweight (60 kg) ====
Round of 16
Carina Mendes Varela (CPV)	5
Sarah Apew (GHA)	0
Rahma Mohamed (EGY)	0
Hadjila Khelif (ALG)	5
Sagar Sy (SEN)	1
Isabel Mulungo (MOZ)	4
Naomie Yumba (COD)	1
Islem Ferchichi (TUN)	3
Felistars Nkandu (ZAM)	3
Nisrine Amine (MAR)	2
Teresiah Mwangi (KEN)	WO
Barbra Paul (SSD)

Quarterfinals
Mariam Sidibé (CIV)	5
Carina Mendes Varela (CPV)	0
Hadjila Khelif (ALG)	5
Isabel Mulungo (MOZ)	0
Islem Ferchichi (TUN)	1
Felistars Nkandu (ZAM)	4
Teresiah Mwangi (KEN)
Cynthia Ogunsemilore (NGR)	ABD-1

Semifinals
Mariam Sidibé (CIV)	0
Hadjila Khelif (ALG)	5
Felistars Nkandu (ZAM)
Cynthia Ogunsemilore (NGR)	RSC-2

Final
Hadjila Khelif (ALG)	0
Cynthia Ogunsemilore (NGR)	5

==== Welterweight (66 kg) ====
Round of 16
Sedja Sanogo (CIV)	0
Mireille Bindzi (CMR)	5
Oumayma Bel Ahbib (MAR)	0
Imane Khelif (ALG)	5
Friza Asiko (KEN)	RSC-2
Awa Mbaye (SEN)
Francinah Kasemang (BOT)	1
Ivanusa Gomes (CPV)	4

Quarterfinals
Olawunmi Shodipe (NGR)	0
Mireille Bindzi (CMR)	5
Imane Khelif (ALG)	RSC-1
Grace Mwakamele (TAN)
Brigitte Mbabi Tsheusi (COD)	5
Friza Asiko (KEN)	0
Ivanusa Gomes (CPV)	0
Alcinda Panguana (MOZ)	5

Semifinals
Mireille Bindzi (CMR)	0
Imane Khelif (ALG)	5
Brigitte Mbabi Tsheusi (COD)	0
Alcinda Panguana (MOZ)	5

Final
Imane Khelif (ALG)	5
Alcinda Panguana (MOZ)	0

==== Middleweight (75 kg) ====
Quarterfinals		Semifinals		Final
Patricia Mbata (NGR)	5
Marie-Joelle Mwika (COD)	0	Patricia Mbata (NGR)	1
Khadija El-Mardi (MAR)	5	Khadija El-Mardi (MAR)	4
Rady Gramane (MOZ)	0			Khadija El-Mardi (MAR)	5
Ndèye Ndiaye (SEN)	0			Elizabeth Andiego (KEN)	0
Molka Ben Mabrouk (TUN)	5	Molka Ben Mabrouk (TUN)	0
Elizabeth Andiego (KEN)	5	Elizabeth Andiego (KEN)	5
Ornella Sathoud (GHA)	0
