= Nigeria at the 2016 Summer Olympics =

- IOC code: NGR
- NOC: Nigeria Olympic Committee
- Website: www.nigeriaolympiccommittee.org

in Rio de Janeiro
- Competitors: 77 in 10 sports
- Flag bearer: Olufunke Oshonaike
- Medals Ranked 78th: Gold 0 Silver 0 Bronze 1 Total 1

Summer Olympics appearances (overview)
- 1952; 1956; 1960; 1964; 1968; 1972; 1976; 1980; 1984; 1988; 1992; 1996; 2000; 2004; 2008; 2012; 2016; 2020; 2024; 2028

Nigeria competed at the 2016 Summer Olympics in Rio de Janeiro, from 5 to 21 August 2016. Since the nation made its debut in 1952, Nigerian athletes had appeared in every edition of the Summer Olympic Games, with the exception of the 1976 Summer Olympics in Montreal because of the African boycott.

Nigeria Olympic Committee fielded a squad of 77 athletes, 51 men and 26 women, to compete in ten sports at the Games. It was the nation's largest delegation sent to the Olympics since 2000, increasing by a third of its full roster size at London 2012. Among the sports represented by the nation's athletes, Nigeria marked its Olympic debut in rowing, as well as its return to swimming and men's football after an eight-year hiatus. Apart from the men's football squad, Nigeria also returned to the Olympic scene in men's basketball for the second consecutive time.

Topping the list of most experienced athletes on the Nigerian roster were table tennis players Segun Toriola, who set a record as Africa's first ever athlete to feature in seven Olympics, and Olufunke Oshonaike, who became the first female from her country to compete at her sixth consecutive Games. Other notable Nigerian competitors also included sprinter and 2008 bronze medalist Blessing Okagbare, British-born slalom kayaker Jonathan Akinyemi, basketball players Chamberlain Oguchi and Alade Aminu, and weightlifting veteran Mariam Usman (women's +75 kg). Football midfielder John Obi Mikel was named the captain of the Nigerian squad, while Oshonaike acted as both his assistant and the nation's flag bearer at the opening ceremony.

Nigeria left Rio de Janeiro with only a bronze medal won by the men's football squad (captained by Mikel), scoring a 3–2 triumph over the Hondurans.

== Medalists ==
Medal	Name	Sport	Event	Date
Bronze	Nigeria Olympic football team: Daniel Akpeyi; Muenfuh Sincere; Kingsley Madu; Shehu Abdullahi; Saturday Erimuya; William Troost-Ekong; Aminu Umar; Oghenekaro Etebo; Imoh Ezekiel; John Obi Mikel; Junior Ajayi; Popoola Saliu; Umar Sadiq; Azubuike Okechukwu; Ndifreke Udo; Stanley Amuzie; Usman Mohammed; Emmanuel Daniel	Football	Men's tournament	August 20

Medals by sport/discipline
Sport	1st place, gold medalist(s)	2nd place, silver medalist(s)	3rd place, bronze medalist(s)	Total
Football	0	0	1	1
Total	0	0	1	1

Medals by day
Day	1st place, gold medalist(s)	2nd place, silver medalist(s)	3rd place, bronze medalist(s)	Total
August 20	0	0	1	1
Total	0	0	1	1

Medals by gender
Gender	1st place, gold medalist(s)	2nd place, silver medalist(s)	3rd place, bronze medalist(s)	Total
Male	0	0	1	1
Female	0	0	0	0
Total	0	0	1	1

== Athletics (track and field) ==
Nigerian athletes have so far achieved qualifying standards in the following athletics events (up to a maximum of 3 athletes in each event):

Following the end of the qualifying period on July 11, 2016, the Athletics Federation of Nigeria (AFN) had selected a list of 27 athletes for the Games, featuring long jumper, sprinter, and Beijing 2008 bronze medalist Blessing Okagbare.

Key

- Note–Ranks given for track events are within the athlete's heat only
- Q = Qualified for the next round
- q = Qualified for the next round as a fastest loser or, in field events, by position without achieving the qualifying target
- NR = National record
- N/A = Round not applicable for the event
- Bye = Athlete not required to compete in round

Track & road events
Men

Athlete	Event	Heat		Quarterfinal		Semifinal		Final	
Athlete	Event	Result	Rank	Result	Rank	Result	Rank	Result	Rank
Ogho-Oghene Egwero	100 m	Bye		10.37	6	Did not advance			
Seye Ogunlewe	100 m	Bye		10.26	4	Did not advance			
Tega Odele	200 m	21.25	8	—N/a		Did not advance			
Ejowvokoghene Oduduru	200 m	20.34	2 Q	—N/a		20.59	7	Did not advance	
Orukpe Erayokan	400 m	47.42	7	—N/a		Did not advance			
Antwon Hicks	110 m hurdles	13.70	4 Q	—N/a		14.26	7	Did not advance	
Miles Ukaoma	400 m hurdles	49.84	5	—N/a		Did not advance			

Women

Athlete	Event	Heat		Quarterfinal		Semifinal		Final	
Athlete	Event	Result	Rank	Result	Rank	Result	Rank	Result	Rank
Gloria Asumnu	100 m	Bye		11.55	5	Did not advance			
Jennifer Madu	100 m	Bye		11.61	5	Did not advance			
Blessing Okagbare	100 m	Bye		11.16	2 Q	11.09	3	Did not advance	
Blessing Okagbare	200 m	22.71	1 Q	—N/a		22.69	5	Did not advance	
Margaret Bamgbose	400 m	51.43	3 q	—N/a		51.92	7	Did not advance	
Patience Okon George	400 m	51.83	2 Q	—N/a		52.52	8	Did not advance	
Omolara Omotosho	400 m	53.22	5	—N/a		Did not advance			
Oluwatobiloba Amusan	100 m hurdles	12.99	5 q	—N/a		12.91	3	Did not advance	
Amaka Ogoegbunam	400 m hurdles	56.96	4	—N/a		Did not advance			
Gloria Asumnu; Jennifer Madu; Blessing Okagbare; Agnes Osazuwa; Peace Uko	4 × 100 m relay	42.55	2 Q	—N/a				43.21	8

Field events
Men

Athlete	Event	Qualification		Final	
Athlete	Event	Distance	Position	Distance	Position
Tosin Oke	Triple jump	16.47	23	Did not advance	
Olu Olamigoke	Triple jump	16.10	32	Did not advance	
Stephen Mozia	Shot put	18.98	28	Did not advance	

Women

Athlete	Event	Qualification		Final	
Athlete	Event	Distance	Position	Distance	Position
Ese Brume	Long jump	6.67	3 Q	6.81	5
Doreen Amata	High jump	1.89	27	Did not advance	
Nwanneka Okwelogu	Shot put	16.67	29	Did not advance	
Chinwe Okoro	Discus throw	58.85	14	Did not advance	

Combined events – Women's heptathlon

Athlete	Event	100H	HJ	SP	200 m	LJ	JT	800 m	Final	Rank
Uhunoma Osazuwa	Result	13.75	1.77	13.15	24.67	5.72	33.42	DSQ	4916	29
Uhunoma Osazuwa	Points	1014	941	737	917	765	542	0	4916	29

== Basketball ==
=== Men's tournament ===
Nigeria men's basketball team qualified for the Olympics by winning the AfroBasket 2015 in Tunisia.

Team roster

The following is the Nigeria roster for the 2016 Summer Olympics. Captain Olumide Oyedeji quit the squad due to personal problems.

Nigeria men's national basketball team – 2016 Summer Olympics roster
Players
Coaches

Pos.	No.	Name	Age – Date of birth	Height	Club	Ctr.
PG	4	Ben Uzoh	28 – 18 March 1988	1.91 m (6 ft 3 in)	Unattached
PG	5	Michael Umeh	31 – 18 September 1984	1.88 m (6 ft 2 in)	Ironi Nahariya	(Israel)
F/C	6	Ike Diogu	32 – 11 September 1983	2.06 m (6 ft 9 in)	Guangdong Southern Tigers	(China)
G/F	7	Ebi Ere	35 – 2 August 1981	1.95 m (6 ft 5 in)	Capitanes de Arecibo	(Puerto Rico)
PG	8	Josh Akognon	30 – 10 February 1986	1.8 m (5 ft 11 in)	Dinamo Sassari	(Italy)
G/F	9	Chamberlain Oguchi	30 – 28 April 1986	1.98 m (6 ft 6 in)	Anwil Włocławek	(Poland)
G/F	10	Stan Okoye	25 – 10 April 1991	1.97 m (6 ft 6 in)	Pallacanestro Trapani	(Italy)
C	11	Andy Ogide	28 – 1 October 1987	2.04 m (6 ft 8 in)	Hapoel Migdal HaEmek	(Israel)
G	12	Michael Gbinije	24 – 5 June 1992	2.01 m (6 ft 7 in)	Syracuse Orange	(United States)
C	13	Shane Lawal	29 – 8 October 1986	2.06 m (6 ft 9 in)	FC Barcelona Lassa	(Spain)
F/C	14	Alade Aminu	28 – 14 September 1987	2.11 m (6 ft 11 in)	Hapoel Eilat B.C.	(Israel)
F/C	15	Ekene Ibekwe	31 – 19 July 1985	2.06 m (6 ft 9 in)	CEZ Nymburk	(Czech Republic)

Head coach

- (United States) Will Voigt

Assistant coach(es)

- (United States) John Kirk Bryant
- (Norway) Mathias Eckhoff

Legend

- (C) Team captain
- Club – describes last
  club before the tournament
- Age – describes age
  on 6 August 2016

Group play

Pos	Team	Pld	W	L	PF	PA	PD	Pts	Qualification
1	Croatia	5	3	2	400	407	−7	8 (Note: In games among the four teams at 3–2, Croatia and Spain were 2–1 while Argentina and Lithuania were 1–2. Croatia beat Spain 72–70, and Lithuania beat Argentina 81–73.)	Quarterfinals
2	Spain	5	3	2	432	357	+75	8	Quarterfinals
3	Lithuania	5	3	2	392	428	−36	8	Quarterfinals
4	Argentina	5	3	2	441	428	+13	8	Quarterfinals
5	Brazil (H)	5	2	3	411	407	+4	7	
6	Nigeria	5	1	4	392	441	−49	6	

Source: FIBA
Rules for classification: 1) points; 2) head-to-head points; 3) head-to-head points difference; 4) head-to-head number of points scored.
(H) Hosts
Notes:

7 August 2016
22:30

Boxscore

Nigeria	66–94	Argentina
Scoring by quarter: 15–22, 16–28, 19–22, 16–22
Pts: Diogu 15; Rebs: Diogu 13; Asts: Gbinije, Umeh 3		Pts: Campazzo 19; Rebs: Scola 9 Asts: Campazzo, Ginóbili 5

Carioca Arena 1, Rio de Janeiro
Attendance: 8,425
Referees: Ilija Belošević (SRB), Damir Javor (SLO), Borys Ryzhyk (UKR)

9 August 2016
19:00

Boxscore

Lithuania	89–80	Nigeria
Scoring by quarter: 13–16, 23–25, 29–13, 24–26
Pts: Mačiulis 21; Rebs: Sabonis 7 Asts: Kalnietis 12		Pts: Diogu 19; Rebs: Diogu 7 Asts: Ere 4

Carioca Arena 1, Rio de Janeiro
Attendance: 5,785
Referees: Stephen Seibel (CAN), Robert Lottermoser (GER), Anne Panther (GER)

11 August 2016
19:00

Boxscore

Nigeria	87–96	Spain
Scoring by quarter: 11–25, 30–18, 25–22, 21–31
Pts: Oguchi 24; Rebs: Diogu 7 Asts: Uzoh 7		Pts: Gasol 16; Rebs: Reyes 9 Asts: Llull 5

Carioca Arena 1, Rio de Janeiro
Attendance: 6,999
Referees: Steven Anderson (USA), José Reyes (MEX), Duan Zhu (CHN)

13 August 2016
22:30

Boxscore

Croatia	76–90	Nigeria
Scoring by quarter: 28–21, 11–22, 17–27, 20–20
Pts: Bogdanović 28; Rebs: Simon 6 Asts: Ukić 4		Pts: Umeh 19; Rebs: Diogu 12; Asts: Ere 6

Carioca Arena 1, Rio de Janeiro
Attendance: 8,720
Referees: Steven Anderson (USA), Damir Javor (SLO), Scott Beker (AUS)

15 August 2016
14:15

Boxscore

Nigeria	69–86	Brazil
Scoring by quarter: 16–15, 15–27, 21–17, 17–27
Pts: Akognon 16; Rebs: Aminu 7 Asts: four players 2		Pts: Nenê 19; Rebs: Nenê 7 Asts: Huertas 11

Carioca Arena 1, Rio de Janeiro
Attendance: 11,173
Referees: Ilija Belošević (SRB), Ferdinand Pascual (PHI), Robert Lottermoser (GER)

== Boxing ==
Nigeria has entered one boxer to compete in each of the following weight classes into the Olympic boxing tournament. Efe Ajagba had claimed his Olympic spot with a semifinal victory at the 2016 African Qualification Tournament in Yaoundé, Cameroon.

Athlete	Event	Round of 32	Round of 16	Quarterfinals	Semifinals	Final	
Athlete	Event	Opposition Result	Opposition Result	Opposition Result	Opposition Result	Opposition Result	Rank
Efe Ajagba	Men's super heavyweight	Bye	Paul (TTO); W KO	Dychko (KAZ); L 0–3	Did not advance		

== Canoeing ==
=== Slalom ===
Nigeria has qualified one canoeist in the men's K-1 class by obtaining a top finish at the 2015 African Canoe Slalom Championships in Sagana, Kenya.

Athlete	Event	Preliminary						Semifinal		Final	
Athlete	Event	Run 1	Rank	Run 2	Rank	Best	Rank	Time	Rank	Time	Rank
Jonathan Akinyemi	Men's K-1	107.49	20	104.59	19	104.59	20	Did not advance			

== Football ==
=== Men's tournament ===
Nigeria men's football team qualified for the Olympics by attaining a top two finish at the 2015 U-23 Africa Cup of Nations in Senegal.

Team roster

The following is the Nigerian squad in the men's football tournament of the 2016 Summer Olympics.

Head coach: Samson Siasia

No.	Pos.	Player	Date of birth (age)	Caps	Goals	Club
1	GK	Daniel Akpeyi*	3 August 1986 (aged 30)	3	0	(South African Football Association) Chippa United
2	DF	Seth Sincere	28 April 1998 (aged 18)	25	0	(Nigeria Football Federation) Rhapsody
3	DF	Kingsley Madu	12 December 1995 (aged 20)	3	0	(Slovak Football Association) AS Trenčín
4	DF	Shehu Abdullahi	12 March 1993 (aged 23)	9	0	(Portuguese Football Federation) União da Madeira
5	DF	Saturday Erimuya	10 January 1998 (aged 18)	6	1	(Turkish Football Federation) Kayseri Erciyesspor
6	DF	William Troost-Ekong	1 September 1993 (aged 22)	6	0	(Norwegian Football Federation) Haugesund
7	FW	Aminu Umar	6 March 1995 (aged 21)	9	2	(Turkish Football Federation) Osmanlıspor
8	MF	Peter Etebo	9 November 1995 (aged 20)	19	11	(Portuguese Football Federation) Feirense
9	FW	Imoh Ezekiel (c)	24 October 1993 (aged 22)	6	0	(Royal Belgian Football Association) Anderlecht
10	MF	Mikel John Obi*	22 April 1987 (aged 29)	6	1	(The Football Association) Chelsea
11	FW	Junior Ajayi	29 January 1996 (aged 20)	19	10	(Egyptian Football Association) Al Ahly
12	MF	Saliu Popoola	7 August 1994 (aged 21)	8	0	(Royal Belgian Football Association) Seraing United
13	FW	Umar Sadiq	2 February 1997 (aged 19)	6	4	(Italian Football Federation) Roma
14	MF	Azubuike Okechukwu	19 April 1997 (aged 19)	24	1	(Turkish Football Federation) Yeni Malatyaspor
15	DF	Ndifreke Udo	15 August 1998 (aged 17)	18	0	(Nigeria Football Federation) Abia Warriors
16	DF	Stanley Amuzie	28 February 1996 (aged 20)	18	0	(Portuguese Football Federation) Olhanense
17	MF	Mohammed Usman	2 March 1994 (aged 22)	19	1	(Portuguese Football Federation) União da Madeira
18	GK	Emmanuel Daniel	17 December 1993 (aged 22)	25	0	(Nigeria Football Federation) Enugu Rangers

* Over-aged player.

Group play

Pos	Team	Pld	W	D	L	GF	GA	GD	Pts	Qualification
1	Nigeria	3	2	0	1	6	6	0	6	Quarter-finals
2	Colombia	3	1	2	0	6	4	+2	5	Quarter-finals
3	Japan	3	1	1	1	7	7	0	4	
4	Sweden	3	0	1	2	2	4	−2	1	

Source: Rio2016 & FIFA
Rules for classification: Tiebreakers
4 August 2016
22:00 (21:00 UTC–4)

Nigeria	5–4	Japan
Sadiq 6'; Etebo 10', 42', 52' (pen.), 66'	Report (Rio2016); Report (FIFA)	Koroki 9' (pen.); Minamino 12'; Asano 70'; Suzuki 90+5'

Arena da Amazônia, Manaus
Attendance: 29,996
Referee: Clément Turpin (France)

7 August 2016
19:00 (18:00 UTC–4)

Sweden	0–1	Nigeria
	Report (Rio2016); Report (FIFA)	Sadiq 40'

Arena da Amazônia, Manaus
Attendance: 23,892
Referee: Matthew Conger (New Zealand)

10 August 2016
19:00

Colombia	2–0	Nigeria
Gutiérrez 4'; Pabón 63' (pen.)	Report (Rio2016); Report (FIFA)

Arena Corinthians, São Paulo
Attendance: 36,702
Referee: César Ramos (Mexico)

Quarterfinal

13 August 2016
16:00

Nigeria	2–0	Denmark
Mikel 15'; Umar 59'	Report (Rio2016); Report (FIFA)

Itaipava Arena Fonte Nova, Salvador
Attendance: 30,307
Referee: Sandro Ricci (Brazil)

Semifinal

17 August 2016
16:00

Nigeria	0–2	Germany
	Report (Rio2016); Report (FIFA)	Klostermann 9'; Petersen 89'

Arena Corinthians, São Paulo
Attendance: 35,562
Referee: Néstor Pitana (Argentina)

Bronze medal match

20 August 2016
13:00

Honduras	2–3	Nigeria
Lozano 71'; Pereira 86'	Report (Rio2016); Report (FIFA)	Sadiq 34', 56'; Umar 49'

Mineirão, Belo Horizonte
Attendance: 9,091
Referee: Sandro Ricci (Brazil)

== Rowing ==
Nigeria has qualified one boat in the women's single sculls for the Games at the 2015 African Continental Qualification Regatta in Tunis, Tunisia.

Athlete	Event	Heats		Repechage		Quarterfinals		Semifinals		Final	
Athlete	Event	Time	Rank	Time	Rank	Time	Rank	Time	Rank	Time	Rank
Chierika Ukogu	Women's single sculls	8:35.34	3 QF	Bye		7:54.44	5 SC/D	8:18.55	4 FD	7:44.76	20

Qualification Legend: FA=Final A (medal); FB=Final B (non-medal); FC=Final C (non-medal); FD=Final D (non-medal); FE=Final E (non-medal); FF=Final F (non-medal); SA/B=Semifinals A/B; SC/D=Semifinals C/D; SE/F=Semifinals E/F; QF=Quarterfinals; R=Repechage

== Swimming ==
Nigeria has received a Universality invitation from FINA to send two swimmers (one male and one female) to the Olympics, signifying its return to the sport after an eight-year hiatus.

Athlete	Event	Heat		Semifinal		Final	
Athlete	Event	Time	Rank	Time	Rank	Time	Rank
Samson Opuakpo	Men's 50 m freestyle	24.85	59	Did not advance			
Rechael Tonjor	Women's 100 m breaststroke	1:21.43	42	Did not advance			

== Table tennis ==
Nigeria has entered four athletes into the table tennis competition at the Games. Olympic veterans Quadri Aruna and Olufunke Oshonaike secured places each in the men's and women's singles by virtue of a top four finish at the 2015 All-Africa Games. Meanwhile, Segun Toriola and Offiong Edem took the remaining spots on the Nigerian team by virtue of their top 2 finish respectively at the African Qualification Tournament in Khartoum, Sudan. For Toriola, he has become the fourth table tennis player and the first ever African athlete to appear in seven editions of the Summer Olympic Games.

Abiodun Bode was awarded the third spot to build the men's team for the Games as the top African nation in the ITTF Olympic Rankings.

Athlete	Event	Preliminary	Round 1	Round 2	Round 3	Round of 16	Quarterfinals	Semifinals	Final / BM	
Athlete	Event	Opposition Result	Opposition Result	Opposition Result	Opposition Result	Opposition Result	Opposition Result	Opposition Result	Opposition Result	Rank
Quadri Aruna	Men's singles	Bye		Wang Y (SVK); W 4–1	Chuang C-y (TPE); W 4–0	Boll (GER); W 4–2	Ma L (CHN); L 0–4	Did not advance		
Segun Toriola	Men's singles	Bye	Prokopcov (CZE); W 4–2	Niwa (JPN); L 2–4	Did not advance					
Bode Abiodun; Quadri Aruna; Segun Toriola	Men's team	—N/a				China; L 0–3	Did not advance			
Offiong Edem	Women's singles	Yee (FIJ); W 4–0	Pavlovich (BLR); L 1–4	Did not advance						
Olufunke Oshonaike	Women's singles	Sahakian (LIB); W 4–3	Diaz (PUR); L 2–4	Did not advance						

== Weightlifting ==
Nigeria has qualified one female weightlifter for the Rio Olympics by virtue of a top four national finish at the 2016 African Championships. The team must allocate this place by June 20, 2016.

Athlete	Event	Snatch		Clean & Jerk		Total	Rank
Athlete	Event	Result	Rank	Result	Rank	Total	Rank
Mariam Usman	Women's +75 kg	115	11	150	8	265	9

== Wrestling ==
Nigeria has qualified a total of seven wrestlers for each of the following classes into the Olympic competition. One of them finished among the top six to book Olympic spot in the women's freestyle 53 kg at the 2015 World Championships, while the majority of Olympic berths were awarded to Nigerian wrestlers, who progressed to the top two finals at the 2016 African & Oceania Qualification Tournament.

Key:

- VT – Victory by Fall.
- PP – Decision by Points – the loser with technical points.
- PO – Decision by Points – the loser without technical points.
- ST – Decision by points – the loser without technical points and a margin of victory of at least 8 (Greco-Roman) or 10 (freestyle) points.
- SP – Decision by points – the loser with technical points and a margin of victory of at least 8 (Greco-Roman) or 10 (freestyle) points.

Men's freestyle

Athlete	Event	Qualification	Round of 16	Quarterfinal	Semifinal	Repechage 1	Repechage 2	Final / BM	
Athlete	Event	Opposition Result	Opposition Result	Opposition Result	Opposition Result	Opposition Result	Opposition Result	Opposition Result	Rank
Amas Daniel	−65 kg	Bye	Iakobishvili (GEO); L 1–3 ^{PP}	Did not advance					17
Soso Tamarau	−97 kg	Bye	Ibragimov (UZB); L 0–4 ^{ST}	Did not advance					19

Women's freestyle

Athlete	Event	Qualification	Round of 16	Quarterfinal	Semifinal	Repechage 1	Repechage 2	Final / BM	
Athlete	Event	Opposition Result	Opposition Result	Opposition Result	Opposition Result	Opposition Result	Opposition Result	Opposition Result	Rank
Mercy Genesis	−48 kg	Bye	Matkowska (POL); L 0–3 ^{PO}	Did not advance					14
Odunayo Adekuoroye	−53 kg	Bye	S Mattsson (SWE); L 0–5 ^{VT}	Did not advance					17
Aminat Adeniyi	−58 kg	Bye	Olli (FIN); L 1–3 ^{PP}	Did not advance					16
Blessing Oborududu	−63 kg	Bye	Soronzonbold (MGL); L 1–3 ^{PP}	Did not advance					14
Hannah Rueben	−69 kg	Bye	Yeats (CAN); L 1–4 ^{SP}	Did not advance					14

== See also ==
- Nigeria at the 2016 Summer Paralympics
