= Nigeria at the 2024 Summer Olympics =

- IOC code: NGR
- NOC: Nigeria Olympic Committee
- Website: nigeriaolympic.org

in Paris, France 26 July 2024 – 11 August 2024
- Competitors: 88 (25 men and 63 women) in 12 sports
- Flag bearers: Tobi Amusan & Anuoluwapo Juwon Opeyori
- Medals: Gold 0 Silver 0 Bronze 0 Total 0

Summer Olympics appearances (overview)
- 1952; 1956; 1960; 1964; 1968; 1972; 1976; 1980; 1984; 1988; 1992; 1996; 2000; 2004; 2008; 2012; 2016; 2020; 2024

Nigeria competed at the 2024 Summer Olympics in Paris from 26 July to 11 August 2024. Since the nation made its debut in Helsinki 1952, Nigerian athletes have appeared in every edition of the Summer Olympic Games, except for Montreal 1976 as part of the Congolese-led boycott.

Nigeria, however, failed to earn a single Olympic medal for the first time since the 2012 Summer Olympics. Notable athletes include Samuel Ogazi, who fell out of the Olympic podium by finishing seventh in the men's 400 m, with Nigeria's men's 4 × 400 metres relay having been disqualified for lane infringement. Blessing Oborududu fell short of her Olympic medal in women's freestyle 68 kg in wrestling, losing to bronze medalist Nonoka Ozaki of Japan.

== Competitors ==
The following is the list of number of competitors in the Games.

Sport	Men	Women	Total
Athletics	18	18	36
Badminton	1	0	1
Basketball	0	12	12
Boxing	2	1	3
Canoeing	0	2	2
Cycling	0	1	1
Football	0	18	18
Swimming	1	1	2
Table tennis	2	2	4
Taekwondo	0	1	1
Weightlifting	0	2	2
Wrestling	1	5	6
Total	25	63	88

== Athletics ==
Nigerian track and field athletes achieved the entry standards for Paris 2024, either by passing the direct qualifying mark (or time for track and road races) or by world ranking, in the following events (a maximum of 3 athletes each):

Key

- Note–Ranks given for track events are within the athlete's heat only
- Q = Qualified for the next round
- q = Qualified for the next round as a fastest loser or, in field events, by position without achieving the qualifying target
- NR = National record
- N/A = Round not applicable for the event
- Bye = Athlete not required to compete in round

Track & road events
Men

Athlete	Event	Heat		Repechage		Semifinal		Final	
Athlete	Event	Result	Rank	Result	Rank	Result	Rank	Result	Rank
Favour Ashe	Men's 100 m	10.16	4 q	—N/a		10.08	6	Did not advance	
Godson Oghenebrume	Men's 100 m	WD							
Kayinsola Ajayi	Men's 100 m	10.02	1 Q	—N/a		10.13	6	Did not advance	
Udodi Onwuzurike	Men's 200 m	20.55	5 R	20.51	1 Q	20.72	7	Did not advance	
Emmanuel Bamidele	Men's 400 m	DNS		Did not advance					
Samuel Ogazi	Men's 400 m	44.50	2 Q	Bye		44.41	3	44.73	7
Chidi Okezie	Men's 400 m	45.52	4	45.92	5	Did not advance			
Edose Ibadin	Men's 800 m	1.46:56	6 R	1:49.09	7	Did not advance			
Ezekiel Nathaniel	Men's 400 m hurdles	48.38	2 Q	48.65	5	Did not advance			
Favour Ashe; Kayinsola Ajayi; Usheoritse Itsekiri; Alaba Akintola	Men's 4 × 100 metres relay	38.20	7	—N/a				Did not advance	
Chidi Okezie; Dubem Amene; Ezekiel Nathaniel; Ifeanyi Emmanuel Ojeli	Men's 4 × 400 metres relay	DQ		—N/a				Did not advance	

Women

Athlete	Event	Heat		Repechage		Semifinal		Final	
Athlete	Event	Result	Rank	Result	Rank	Result	Rank	Result	Rank
Rosemary Chukwuma	Women's 100 m	11.26	3 Q	—N/a		11.39	8	Did not advance	
Favour Ofili	Women's 100 m	DNS		—N/a		Did not advance			
Tima Godbless	Women's 100 m	11.33	6	—N/a		Did not advance			
Favour Ofili	Women's 200 m	22.24	1 Q	Bye		22.05	2 Q	22.24	6
Tima Godbless	Women's 200 m	DNS		Did not advance					
Ella Onojuvwevwo	Women's 400 m	51.65	6 R	50.59	1 Q	51.05	6	Did not advance	
Esther Joseph	Women's 400 m	DQ		Did not advance					
Tobi Amusan	Women's 100 m hurdles	12.49	1 Q	Bye		12.55	3	Did not advance	
Favour Ofili; Tima Godbless; Rosemary Chukwuma; Justina Tiana Eyakpobeyan	Women's 4 × 100 metres relay	42.70 SB	6	—N/a				Did not advance	

Mixed

Athlete	Event	Heat		Repechage		Semifinal		Final	
Athlete	Event	Result	Rank	Result	Rank	Result	Rank	Result	Rank
Ella Onojuvwevwo; Samuel Ogazi; Ifeanyi Emmanuel Ojeli; Patience Okon George	Mixed 4 × 400 metres relay	3:19.99	9	—N/a				Did not advance	

Field events

Athlete	Event	Qualification		Final	
Athlete	Event	Distance	Position	Distance	Position
Chukwuebuka Enekwechi	Men's shot put	21.13	9 q	21.42	6
Chinecherem Nnamdi	Men's javelin throw	77.53	14	Did not advance	
Temitope Adeshina	Women's high jump	1.88	9	Did not advance	
Ruth Usoro	Women's long jump	6.68	5 q	6.58	10
Ese Brume	Women's long jump	6.76	4 Q	6.70	5
Prestina Ochonogor	Women's long jump	6.65	7 q	6.24	12
Obiageri Amaechi	Women's discus throw	45.45	16	Did not advance	
Ashley Anumba	Women's discus throw	58.83	14	Did not advance	
Chioma Onyekwere	Women's discus throw	60.78	15	Did not advance	
Oyesade Olatoye	Women's hammer throw	66.41	14	Did not advance	

== Badminton ==
Nigeria entered one badminton players into the Olympic tournament based on the BWF Race to Paris Rankings.

Athlete	Event	Group stage			Elimination	Quarter-final	Semi-final	Final / BM	
Athlete	Event	Opposition Score	Opposition Score	Rank	Opposition Score	Opposition Score	Opposition Score	Opposition Score	Rank
Anuoluwapo Juwon Opeyori	Men's singles	Li (CHN); L 0–2	Künzi (SUI); L 0–2	3	Did not advance				

== Basketball ==
=== 5×5 basketball ===
Summary

Team	Event	Group stage				Quarterfinal	Semifinal	Final / BM	
Team	Event	Opposition Score	Opposition Score	Opposition Score	Rank	Opposition Score	Opposition Score	Opposition Score	Rank
Nigeria women's	Women's tournament	Australia; W 75–62	France; L 54–75	Canada; W 79–70	3	United States; L 74–88	Did not advance		8

==== Women's tournament ====
The Nigeria women's national basketball team qualified for the Olympics by finishing in the top two eligible nations at the 2024 Olympic Qualifying Tournaments in Antwerp, Belgium.

Team roster

A 16-player roster was announced on 7 July 2024. The final squad was revealed on 23 July 2024.

Nigeria women's national basketball team – 2024 Summer Olympics roster
Players
Coaches

Pos.	No.	Name	Age – Date of birth	Height	Club	Ctr.
F	0	Amy Okonkwo (C)	27 – 26 August 1996	1.88 m (6 ft 2 in)	Tango Bourges Basket	(France)
C	3	Pallas Kunaiyi-Akpannah	27 – 12 July 1997	1.88 m (6 ft 2 in)	Magnolia Basket Campobasso	(Italy)
G	4	Elizabeth Balogun	23 – 9 September 2000	1.85 m (6 ft 1 in)	CB Bembibre	(Spain)
SG	5	Olaoluwatomi Taiwo	24 – 16 June 2000	1.78 m (5 ft 10 in)	Esgueira Basket	(Portugal)
C	6	Lauren Ebo	24 – 7 June 2000	1.93 m (6 ft 4 in)	Turgutlu Belediyespor	(Turkey)
G	9	Ifunanya Okoro	25 – 6 July 1999	1.83 m (6 ft 0 in)	Tindastóll	(Iceland)
PG	10	Promise Amukamara	31 – 22 June 1993	1.75 m (5 ft 9 in)	Dynamo Kursk	(Russia)
F	20	Murjanatu Musa	24 – 5 May 2000	1.87 m (6 ft 2 in)	Celta de Vigo	(Spain)
C	22	Blessing Ejiofor	25 – 2 September 1998	1.95 m (6 ft 5 in)	Celta de Vigo	(Spain)
PG	23	Ezinne Kalu	32 – 26 June 1992	1.73 m (5 ft 8 in)	Basket Roma	(Italy)
SF	25	Adebola Adeyeye	24 – 10 November 1999	1.88 m (6 ft 2 in)	Kentucky Wildcats	(United States)
F	33	Nicole Enabosi	27 – 26 March 1997	1.83 m (6 ft 0 in)	C' Chartres Basket Féminin	(France)

Head coach

- (Nigeria) Rena Wakama

Assistant coach(es)

- (France) Wani Muganguzi

Legend

- (C) Team captain
- Club – describes last
  club before the tournament
- Age – describes age
  on 28 July 2024

Group play

Pos	Team	Pld	W	L	PF	PA	PD	Pts	Qualification
1	France (H)	3	2	1	222	187	+35	5 (Note: France 3 Pts, +14 PD; Australia 3 Pts, −6 PD; Nigeria 3 Pts, −8 PD.)	Quarterfinals
2	Australia	3	2	1	211	212	−1	5	Quarterfinals
3	Nigeria	3	2	1	208	207	+1	5	Quarterfinals
4	Canada	3	0	3	189	224	−35	3	

Source: FIBA
Rules for classification: 1) classification points; 2) head-to-head results; 3) head-to-head game points difference; 4) head-to-head number of game points scored.
(H) Hosts
Notes:

29 July 2024
11:00

Boxscore

Nigeria	75–62	Australia
Scoring by quarter: 18–17, 23–11, 10–19, 24–15
Pts: Kalu 19; Rebs: Kunaiyi-Akpannah, Musa 7 Asts: Amukamara 9		Pts: Smith 15; Rebs: Talbot 10; Asts: Talbot 12

Stade Pierre-Mauroy, Lille
Attendance: 24,023
Referees: Amy Bonner (USA), Rabah Noujaim (LBN), Jenna Reneau (USA)

1 August 2024
17:15

Boxscore

France	75–54	Nigeria
Scoring by quarter: 24–20, 14–11, 16–8, 21–15
Pts: Johannès 15; Rebs: Badiane 6 Asts: Williams 7		Pts: Kalu 18; Rebs: Musa 9 Asts: Amukamara 5

Stade Pierre-Mauroy, Lille
Attendance: 17,483
Referees: Amy Bonner (USA), Carlos Peralta (ECU), Péter Praksch (HUN)

4 August 2024
13:30

Boxscore

Canada	70–79	Nigeria
Scoring by quarter: 18–18, 23–19, 5–23, 24–19
Pts: Colley 17; Rebs: Amihere 11; Asts: five players 2		Pts: Kalu 21; Rebs: Kunaiyi-Akpannah 7 Asts: Amukamara 6

Stade Pierre-Mauroy, Lille
Attendance: 27,107
Referees: Amy Bonner (USA), Blanca Burns (USA), Ariadna Chueca (ESP)

Quarterfinal

7 August 2024
21:30

Boxscore

Nigeria	74–88	United States
Scoring by quarter: 17–26, 16–26, 15–24, 26–12
Pts: Amukamara 19; Rebs: Kunaiyi-Akpannah 8 Asts: Kalu 7		Pts: Wilson 20; Rebs: Wilson 11; Asts: Thomas 6

Accor Arena, Paris
Attendance: 12,437
Referees: Viola Györgyi (NOR), Juan Fernández (ARG), Yann Davidson (MAD)

== Boxing ==
For the first time since 2016, Nigeria entered three boxers into the Olympic tournament. Dolapo Omole (men's featherweight), Olaitan Olaore (men's heavyweight) and Cynthia Ogunsemilore (women's lightweight) secured one spots in their respective division by advancing to the final match and win the 2023 African Olympic Qualification Tournament in Dakar, Senegal. However, Cynthia Ogunsemilore was ultimately disqualified for failing a drug test, with Dolapo Omole having failed to participate for unknown reasons.

Athlete	Event	Round of 32	Round of 16	Quarterfinals	Semifinals	Final	
Athlete	Event	Opposition Result	Opposition Result	Opposition Result	Opposition Result	Opposition Result	Rank
~~Dolapo Omole~~	Men's 57 kg	Did not participate					
Olaitan Olaore	Men's 92 kg	Aibek Oralbay (KAZ); L 0–5	Did not advance				
~~Cynthia Ogunsemilore~~	Women's 60 kg	Disqualified					

== Canoeing ==
=== Sprint ===
2 Nigerian female canoeists qualified one boat for the Games through the gold medal result in the C-2 500 metres event at the 2023 African Olympic in Abuja, Nigeria.

Athlete	Event	Heats		Quarterfinals		Semifinals		Final	
Athlete	Event	Time	Rank	Time	Rank	Time	Rank	Time	Rank
Ayomide Bello; Beauty Otudeo	Women's C-2 500 m	2:10.11	6	2:07.86	6	bye		2:15.20	5

Qualification Legend: FA = Qualify to final (medal); FB = Qualify to final B (non-medal)

== Cycling ==
=== Road ===
Nigeria qualified one rider to compete in the women's road race by finishing in the top two at the 2023 African Championships in Accra, Ghana.

Athlete	Event	Time	Rank
Ese Ukpeseraye	Women's road race	DNF	—

=== Track ===
Sprint

Athlete	Event	Qualification		Round 1	Repechage 1	Round 2	Repechage 2	Round 3	Repechage 3	Quarterfinals	Semifinals	Finals	
Athlete	Event	Time Speed (km/h)	Rank	Opposition Time Speed (km/h)	Opposition Time Speed (km/h)	Opposition Time Speed (km/h)	Opposition Time Speed (km/h)	Opposition Time Speed (km/h)	Opposition Time Speed (km/h)	Rank	Rank	Opposition Time Speed (km/h)	Rank
Ese Ukpeseraye	Women's sprint	11.652 61.792	28	Did not advance									

Keirin

Athlete	Event	Round 1	Repechage	Quarterfinals	Semifinals	Final
Athlete	Event	Rank	Rank	Rank	Rank	Rank
Ese Ukpeseraye	Women's keirin	6 R	4	Did not advance		

== Football ==
Team	Event	Group Stage				Quarterfinal	Semifinal	Final / BM	
Team	Event	Opposition Score	Opposition Score	Opposition Score	Rank	Opposition Score	Opposition Score	Opposition Score	Rank
Nigeria women's	Women's tournament	Brazil; L 0–1	Spain; L 0–1	Japan; L 1–3	Did not advance				

=== Women's tournament ===
Nigeria women's football team qualified for the Olympics by winning the fourth round match in the 2024 CAF Women's Olympic qualifying tournament.

Team roster

Nigeria named a squad of 18 players and 4 alternates for the tournament on 3 July 2024. On 10 July, Halimatu Ayinde withdrew from the squad due to injury and was replaced by Ifeoma Onumonu. Regina Otu was added to the alternate list.

Head coach: (United States) Randy Waldrum

No.	Pos.	Player	Date of birth (age)	Caps	Goals	Club
1	GK	Tochukwu Oluehi	2 May 1987 (aged 37)			(Saudi Arabian Football Federation) Eastern Flames
2	DF	Michelle Alozie	28 April 1997 (aged 27)			(United States Soccer Federation) Houston Dash
3	DF	Osinachi Ohale	21 December 1991 (aged 32)			(Mexican Football Federation) Pachuca
4	DF	Nicole Payne	18 January 2001 (aged 23)			(United States Soccer Federation) Portland Thorns
5	DF	Chidinma Okeke	11 August 2000 (aged 23)			(Japan Football Association) Mynavi Sendai
6	FW	Esther Okoronkwo	27 March 1997 (aged 27)			(Chinese Football Association) Changchun
7	MF	Toni Payne	22 April 1995 (aged 29)			(Royal Spanish Football Federation) Sevilla
8	FW	Asisat Oshoala	9 October 1994 (aged 29)			(United States Soccer Federation) Bay FC
9	FW	Chinonyerem Macleans	1 October 1999 (aged 24)			(Russian Football Union) Lokomotiv Moscow
10	MF	Christy Ucheibe	25 December 2000 (aged 23)			(Portuguese Football Federation) Benfica
11	MF	Jennifer Echegini	22 March 2001 (aged 23)			(Italian Football Federation) Juventus
12	FW	Uchenna Kanu	20 June 1997 (aged 27)			(United States Soccer Federation) Racing Louisville
13	MF	Deborah Abiodun	2 November 2003 (aged 20)			(United States Soccer Federation) Pittsburgh Panthers
14	DF	Oluwatosin Demehin	13 March 2002 (aged 22)			(French Football Federation) Reims
15	FW	Rasheedat Ajibade	8 December 1999 (aged 24)			(Royal Spanish Football Federation) Atlético Madrid
16	GK	Chiamaka Nnadozie	8 December 2000 (aged 23)			(French Football Federation) Paris FC
17	FW	Chinwendu Ihezuo	30 April 1997 (aged 27)			(Mexican Football Federation) Pachuca
18	FW	Ifeoma Onumonu	25 February 1994 (aged 30)			(United States Soccer Federation) Utah Royals

Group play

Pos	Team	Pld	W	D	L	GF	GA	GD	Pts	Qualification
1	Spain	3	3	0	0	5	1	+4	9	Advance to knockout stage
2	Japan	3	2	0	1	6	4	+2	6	Advance to knockout stage
3	Brazil	3	1	0	2	2	4	−2	3	Advance to knockout stage
4	Nigeria	3	0	0	3	1	5	−4	0	

Source: FIFA
Rules for classification: Group stage tiebreakers
25 July 2024
19:00

Nigeria	0–1	Brazil
	Report	Gabi Nunes 37'

Stade de Bordeaux, Bordeaux
Attendance: 6,244
Referee: Kim Yu-jeong (South Korea)

28 July 2024
19:00

Spain	1–0	Nigeria
Putellas 85'	Report

Stade de la Beaujoire, Nantes
Attendance: 11,079
Referee: Tori Penso (United States)

31 July 2024
17:00

Japan	3–1	Nigeria
Hamano 22'; Tanaka 32'; Kitagawa 45+5'	Report	Echegini 42'

Stade de la Beaujoire, Nantes
Attendance: 6,480
Referee: Emikar Calderas (Venezuela)

== Swimming ==
Nigeria sent two swimmers to compete at the 2024 Paris Olympics.

Athlete	Event	Heat		Semifinal		Final	
Athlete	Event	Time	Rank	Time	Rank	Time	Rank
Tobi Sijuade	Men's 50 m freestyle	23.34	43	Did not advance			
Adaku Nwandu	Women's 50 m freestyle	26.62	34	Did not advance			

== Table tennis ==
Nigeria entered four table tennis player into Paris 2024. Olajide Omotayo, Offiong Edem and Fatimo Bello qualified for the games following the triumph of winning one of six available quota places, in their respective event, at the 2024 African Qualification Tournament in Kigali, Rwanda. Quadri Aruna also qualified as the highest rank African table tennis player.

Athlete	Event	Preliminary	Round 1	Round 2	Round of 16	Quarterfinals	Semifinals	Final / BM	
Athlete	Event	Opposition Result	Opposition Result	Opposition Result	Opposition Result	Opposition Result	Opposition Result	Opposition Result	Rank
Quadri Aruna	Men's singles	Bye	E Ionescu (ROU); L 3–4	Did not advance					
Olajide Omotayo	Men's singles	Bye	Alamiyan (IRI); L 1–4	Did not advance					
Offiong Edem	Women's singles	Bye	Takahashi (BRA); L 0–4	Did not advance					
Fatimo Bello	Women's singles	Bye	Yuan (FRA); L 0–4	Did not advance					

== Taekwondo ==
Nigeria qualified one athlete to compete at the games. Tokyo 2020 Olympian Elizabeth Anyanacho qualified for Paris 2024 following the triumph of her victory in the semifinal round in under 67 kg class, at the 2024 African Qualification Tournament in Dakar, Senegal.

Athlete	Event	Qualification	Round of 16	Quarterfinals	Semifinals	Repechage	Final / BM	
Athlete	Event	Opposition Result	Opposition Result	Opposition Result	Opposition Result	Opposition Result	Opposition Result	Rank
Elizabeth Anyanacho	Women's −67 kg	Song Jie (CHN); L 0–2	Did not advance					

== Weightlifting ==
Nigeria entered two weightlifters into the Olympic competition. Rafiatu Lawal (women's 59 kg) and Joy Ogbonne Eze (women's 71 kg) secured two of the top ten slots in their weight divisions based on the IWF Olympic Qualification Rankings.

Athlete	Event	Snatch		Clean & Jerk		Total	Rank
Athlete	Event	Result	Rank	Result	Rank	Total	Rank
Rafiatu Lawal	Women's −59 kg	100	7	130	4	230	5
Joy Ogbonne Eze	Women's −71 kg	101	9	131	7	232	7

== Wrestling ==
Nigeria qualified six wrestlers for each of the following classes into the Olympic competition. Odunayo Adekuoroye qualified for the games by virtue of top five results through the 2023 World Championships in Belgrade, Serbia; meanwhile the other five wrestlers qualified by winning the semifinal round at the 2024 African & Oceania Olympic Qualification Tournament in Alexandria, Egypt.

Key:

- VT (ranking points: 5–0 or 0–5) – Victory by fall.
- VB (ranking points: 5–0 or 0–5) – Victory by injury (VF for forfeit, VA for withdrawal or disqualification)
- PP (ranking points: 3–1 or 1–3) – Decision by points – the loser with technical points.
- PO (ranking points: 3–0 or 0–3) – Decision by points – the loser without technical points.
- ST (ranking points: 4–0 or 0–4) – Great superiority – the loser without technical points and a margin of victory of at least 8 (Greco-Roman) or 10 (freestyle) points.
- SP (ranking points: 4–1 or 1–4) – Technical superiority – the loser with technical points and a margin of victory of at least 8 (Greco-Roman) or 10 (freestyle) points.

Freestyle

Athlete	Event	Round of 16	Quarterfinal	Semifinal	Repechage	Final / BM	
Athlete	Event	Opposition Result	Opposition Result	Opposition Result	Opposition Result	Opposition Result	Rank
Ashton Mutuwa	Men's −125 kg	Ligeti (HUN); L ^{PO}	Did not advance				
Christianah Ogunsanya	Women's −53 kg	Batkhuyag (MGL); L ^{VT}	Did not advance				
Odunayo Adekuoroye	Women's −57 kg	Chaimaa (ALG); W 0–0^{VB}	Hong (CHN); L 0–5^{VT}	Did not advance			
Esther Kolawole	Women's −62 kg	Tynybekova (KGZ); L ^{PO}	Did not advance				
Blessing Oborududu	Women's −68 kg	Morais (CAN); W 8–2^{PO}	Larroque (FRA); W 6–2^{PO}	Zhumanazarova (KGZ); L 1–3^{PO}	Bye	Ozaki (JPN); L 0–3^{PO}	5
Hannah Rueben	Women's −76 kg	Enkh-Amar (MGL); L 2–5 ^{PP}	Did not advance				

== See also ==
- Nigeria at the 2024 Winter Youth Olympics
