= Ogechi Onyinanya =

Nigerian footballer

Personal information
- Date of birth: 26 May 1985 (age 41)
- Place of birth: Nigeria
- Position: Goalkeeper

Senior career*
| Years | Team | Apps | (Gls) |
- Pelican Stars

International career
- Nigeria
- * Club domestic league appearances and goals

Ogechi Onyinanya is a Nigerian football goalkeeper. She was part of the Nigeria women's national football team at the 2004 Summer Olympics.

== See also ==
- Nigeria at the 2004 Summer Olympics
