= Joshua Tukamuhebwa =

Ugandan professional boxer and a light welterweight

Joshua Tukamuhebwa is a Ugandan professional boxer who competes in the light welterweight division. He is the captain for the Uganda National Boxing team.

== Career ==
In February 2014, Tukamuhebwa participated in the national boxing championship at MTN arena in Lugogo. He was the youngest person to participate in the competition at 14 years old.

Tukamuhebwa participated in the 2022 Commonwealth Games in Birmingham, England where he won 2 games and lost a game to Wyatt Sanford 4–1 in the quarter finals. He and 16 other players represented Uganda national team in the Africa Boxing Championships which happened from 25 July to 5 August 2023 in Yaounde, Cameroon.

Tukamuhebwa qualified to the Africa Olympic boxing qualifiers in 2023 which took place in Dakar Senegal after beating Japher Onen in the Boxing Champions League.

In 2024, Tukamuhebwa participated in the 2024 Summer Olympics Games qualifiers in Busto Arsizio, Italy and won two bouts and lost to Alkasbeh Obada from Jordan in round 16.

== Recognitions ==
Tukamuhebwa has been recognized as the gold medalist novices 2012 under light fly weight, silver medalist intermediates 2014, gold medalist national opens 2017 (youth), gold medalist national opens 2019 elite, elite light welter weight in Uganda Boxing Champions League 2022 after winning against Pius Siriro by knock-out.

== Professional Record ==
21 bouts (46.67% by knockouts), 60 rounds
Result	Record	Opponent	Date	Result	Location	Tournament
Loss	26-24-0	(Jordan) Obada Al Kasbeh	March 13, 2024	L-UD	(Jordan) E-Work Arena, Busto Arsizio	2024 Olympic Qualifier Preliminaries-Round of 16
Win	23-15-0	(Jordan) Robert Jitaru	March 7, 2024	W-TKO	(Jordan) E-Work Arena, Busto Arsizio	2024 Olympic Qualifier Preliminaries-Round of 32
Win	debut	(Jordan) Edgar Garcia DeLeon	March 5, 2024	W-RSC	(Jordan) E-Work Arena, Busto Arsizio	2024 Olympic Qualifier Preliminaries-Round of 64
Loss	45-23-0	(Jordan) Richarno Colin	September 14, 2023	L-MD	(Senegal) Saly	African Olympic Qualifier

== See also ==
- Uganda at the 2019 African Games
- Uganda Boxing Federation
- Boxing at the 2022 Commonwealth Games - Men's light welterweight
- 2023 African Boxing Olympic Qualification Tournament
- Uganda at the 2022 Commonwealth Games
