= Weightlifting at the 1984 Summer Olympics – Men's +110 kg =

Weightlifting at the Olympics

Men's +110 kg at the Games of the XXIII Olympiad
- Venue: Albert Gersten Pavilion
- Date: 8 August 1984
- Competitors: 9 from 7 nations
- Winning total: 412.5 kg

Medalists
| 1st place, gold medalist(s) | | Dean Lukin | Australia |
| 2nd place, silver medalist(s) | | Mario Martinez | United States |
| 3rd place, bronze medalist(s) | | Manfred Nerlinger | West Germany |

The men's +110 kg weightlifting competitions at the 1984 Summer Olympics in Los Angeles took place on 8 August at the Albert Gersten Pavilion. It was the fourth appearance of the super heavyweight class. The weightlifter from Australia won the gold, with a combined lift of 412.5 kg.

== Results ==
| Rank | Name | Country | kg |
|---|---|---|---|
| 1 | Dean Lukin | Australia | 412.5 |
| 2 | Mario Martinez | United States | 410.0 |
| 3 | Manfred Nerlinger | West Germany | 397.5 |
| 4 | Ioannis Tsintsaris | Greece | 347.5 |
| 5 | Batholomew Oluoma | Nigeria | 337.5 |
| 6 | Mosad Mosbah | Egypt | 330.0 |
| AC | Serafim Grammatikopoulos | Greece | 140.0 (DQ) |
| AC | Ironbar Bassey | Nigeria | 155.0 |
| AC | Stefan Laggner | Austria | 385.0 (DQ) |
