= Celestina Onyeka =

Nigerian footballer

Personal information
- Date of birth: 15 July 1984 (age 42)
- Place of birth: Nigeria
- Position: Defender

Senior career*
Years	Team	Apps	(Gls)
2004	Pelican Stars		

International career
2004	Nigeria	0 (?)	(0)
- * Club domestic league appearances and goals

Celestina Onyeka // (born 15 July 1984) is a Nigerian football defender who played for the Nigeria women's national football team.

She was part of the national team at the 2004 Summer Olympics. On club level she played for Pelican Stars.

== See also ==
- Nigeria at the 2004 Summer Olympics
