= Nigeria at the 2020 Summer Olympics =

- IOC code: NGR
- NOC: Nigeria Olympic Committee
- Website: www.nigeriaolympiccommittee.org

in Tokyo, Japan 23 July 2021 – 8 August 2021
- Competitors: 55 in 10 sports
- Flag bearers (opening): Odunayo Adekuoroye; Quadri Aruna
- Flag bearer (closing): Odunayo Adekuoroye
- Medals Ranked 74th: Gold 0 Silver 1 Bronze 1 Total 2

Summer Olympics appearances (overview)
- 1952; 1956; 1960; 1964; 1968; 1972; 1976; 1980; 1984; 1988; 1992; 1996; 2000; 2004; 2008; 2012; 2016; 2020; 2024; 2028

Nigeria competed at the 2020 Summer Olympics in Tokyo. Originally scheduled to take place from 24 July to 9 August 2020, the Games were postponed to 23 July to 8 August 2021, because of the COVID-19 pandemic. Since the nation made its debut in 1952, Nigerian athletes have appeared in every edition of the Summer Olympic Games, with the exception of the 1976 Summer Olympics in Montreal because of the African boycott.

== Medalists ==
Medal	Name	Sport	Event	Date
Silver	Blessing Oborududu	Wrestling	Women's freestyle 68 kg	August 3
Bronze	Ese Brume	Athletics	Women's long jump	August 3

== Competitors ==
The following is the list of number of Nigerian competitors in the Games.

Sport	Men	Women	Total
Athletics	7	7	14
Badminton	2	1	3
Basketball	12	12	24
Canoeing	0	1	1
Gymnastics	1	0	1
Rowing	0	1	1
Swimming	0	1	1
Table tennis	2	2	4
Taekwondo	0	1	1
Wrestling	1	4	5
Total	25	30	55

== Summary ==
=== Mass disqualification of Nigerian athletes ===
On 28 July 2021, the Athletics Integrity Unit announced that Nigeria had failed to meet the minimum drug testing requirements as per "Rule 15", which requires at least three no-notice outside of competition blood and urine drug tests no less than three weeks apart for 10 of their athletes. As such, all 10 athletes were disqualified from participating in their events. Those disqualified included Rosemary Chukwuma, Annette Echikunwoke, Favour Ofili, Chidi Okezie, Chioma Onyekwere, and Ruth Usoro.

=== Doping ===
On 31 July 2021 the Athletics Integrity Unit announced that Blessing Okagbare was provisionally suspended following a positive doping test for Human Growth Hormone from a sample collected outside of competition on 19 July 2021.

== Athletics ==
Nigerian athletes further achieved the entry standards, either by qualifying time or by world ranking, in the following track and field events (up to a maximum of 3 athletes in each event):

Key

- Note–Ranks given for track events are within the athlete's heat only
- Q = Qualified for the next round
- q = Qualified for the next round as a fastest loser or, in field events, by position without achieving the qualifying target
- NR = National record
- N/A = Round not applicable for the event
- Bye = Athlete not required to compete in round

Track & road events
Men

Athlete	Event	Heat		Quarterfinal		Semifinal		Final	
Athlete	Event	Result	Rank	Result	Rank	Result	Rank	Result	Rank
Enoch Adegoke	100 m	Bye		9.98 PB	1 Q	10.00	2 Q	DNF	
Usheoritse Itsekiri	100 m	Bye		10.15	3 Q	10.29	7	Did not advance	
Divine Oduduru	100 m	Bye		DSQ		Did not advance			
Divine Oduduru	200 m	20.36	2 Q	—N/a		20.16	3	Did not advance	

Women

Athlete	Event	Heat		Quarterfinal		Semifinal		Final	
Athlete	Event	Result	Rank	Result	Rank	Result	Rank	Result	Rank
Nzubechi Grace Nwokocha	100 m	Bye		11.00 PB	3 Q	11.07	5	Did not advance	
Blessing Okagbare	100 m	Bye		11.05	1 Q	DNS		Did not advance	
Nzubechi Grace Nwokocha	200 m	22.47 PB	3 Q	—N/a		22.47 PB	4	Did not advance	
Patience Okon George	400 m	52.41	7	—N/a		Did not advance			
Tobi Amusan	100 m hurdles	12.72	1 Q	—N/a		12.62	1 Q	12.60	4
Tobi Amusan; Ese Brume; Patience Okon George; Nzubechi Grace Nwokocha	4 × 100 m relay	43.25	6	—N/a				did not advance	

Mixed

Athlete	Event	Heat		Final	
Athlete	Event	Result	Rank	Result	Rank
Patience Okon George; Samson Oghenewegba Nathaniel; Ifeanyi Emmanuel Ojeli; Imaobong Nse Uko	4 × 400 m relay	3:13.60 AR	7	Did not advance	

Field events

Athlete	Event	Qualification		Final	
Athlete	Event	Distance	Position	Distance	Position
Chukwuebuka Enekwechi	Men's shot put	21.16	7 q	19.74	12
Ese Brume	Women's long jump	6.76	6 Q	6.97	3rd place, bronze medalist(s)

== Badminton ==
Nigeria entered three badminton players for each of the following events into the Olympic tournament. Godwin Olofua and Anuoluwapo Juwon Opeyori (men's doubles), with Dorcas Ajoke Adesokan on the women's side, topped the field of badminton players from Africa to lock the places on the Nigerian squad in their respective events based on the BWF Race to Tokyo Rankings.

Athlete	Event	Group stage				Elimination	Quarterfinal	Semifinal	Final / BM	
Athlete	Event	Opposition Score	Opposition Score	Opposition Score	Rank	Opposition Score	Opposition Score	Opposition Score	Opposition Score	Rank
Dorcas Ajoke Adesokan	Women's singles	Azurmendi (ESP); L (10–21, 2–21)	An S-y (KOR); L (3–21, 6–21)	—N/a	3	Did not advance				
Godwin Olofua; Anuoluwapo Juwon Opeyori	Men's doubles	Endo / Watanabe (JPN); L (2–21, 7–21)	Astrup / Rasmussen (DEN); L (7–21, 10–21)	Ivanov / Sozonov (ROC); L (8–21, 10–21)	4	—N/a	Did not advance			

== Basketball ==
Summary

Team	Event	Group stage				Quarterfinal	Semifinal	Final / BM	
Team	Event	Opposition Score	Opposition Score	Opposition Score	Rank	Opposition Score	Opposition Score	Opposition Score	Rank
Nigeria men's	Men's tournament	Australia; L 65–84	Germany; L 92–99	Italy; L 71–80	4	did not advance			
Nigeria women's	Women's tournament	United States; L 72–81	France; L 62–87	Japan; L 83–102	4	Did not advance			

=== Men's tournament ===
Nigeria men's basketball team qualified for the Olympics as the highest-ranked African squad at the 2019 FIBA World Cup in China.

Team roster

A 15-player roster was announced on 6 July 2021. The final squad was released on 20 July 2021.

Nigeria national basketball team roster
Players
Coaches

Pos.	No.	Name	Age – Date of birth	Height	Club	Ctr.
F	0	KZ Okpala	22 – 28 April 1999	2.03 m (6 ft 8 in)	Miami Heat	(United States)
G	3	Caleb Agada	26 – 31 August 1994	1.91 m (6 ft 3 in)	Hapoel Be'er Sheva	(Israel)
PF	8	Ekpe Udoh	34 – 20 May 1987	2.08 m (6 ft 10 in)	Virtus Bologna	(Italy)
F	10	Chimezie Metu	24 – 22 March 1997	2.11 m (6 ft 11 in)	Sacramento Kings	(United States)
SG	11	Obi Emegano	28 – 29 April 1993	1.89 m (6 ft 2 in)	Fuenlabrada	(Spain)
G	13	Miye Oni	23 – 4 August 1997	1.96 m (6 ft 5 in)	Utah Jazz	(United States)
C	15	Jahlil Okafor	25 – 15 December 1995	2.08 m (6 ft 10 in)	Detroit Pistons	(United States)
G	20	Josh Okogie	22 – 1 September 1998	1.93 m (6 ft 4 in)	Minnesota Timberwolves	(United States)
G	22	Gabe Vincent	25 – 14 June 1996	1.90 m (6 ft 3 in)	Miami Heat	(United States)
F	33	Jordan Nwora	22 – 9 September 1998	2.03 m (6 ft 8 in)	Milwaukee Bucks	(United States)
G	34	Ike Nwamu	28 – 3 June 1993	1.96 m (6 ft 5 in)	Samara	(Russia)
PF	55	Precious Achiuwa	21 – 19 September 1999	2.03 m (6 ft 8 in)	Miami Heat	(United States)

Head coach

- (United States) Mike Brown

Assistant coach(es)

- (Spain) Jordi Fernández
- (Nigeria) Alexander Nwora

Legend

- Club – describes last
  club before the tournament
- Age – describes age
  on 25 July 2021

Group play

Pos	Team	Pld	W	L	PF	PA	PD	Pts	Qualification
1	Australia	3	3	0	259	226	+33	6	Quarterfinals
2	Italy	3	2	1	255	239	+16	5	Quarterfinals
3	Germany	3	1	2	257	273	−16	4	Quarterfinals
4	Nigeria	3	0	3	230	263	−33	3	

Source: TOCOG and FIBA
Rules for classification: 1) classification points; 2) head-to-head results; 3) head-to-head game points difference; 4) head-to-head number of game points scored.

25 July 2021
17:20
v

Boxscore

Australia	84–67	Nigeria
Scoring by quarter: 23–23, 20–17, 15–12, 26–15
Pts: Mills 25; Rebs: Kay 8 Asts: Mills 6		Pts: Emegano 12; Rebs: Achiuwa 6 Asts: Agada, Okogie 3

Saitama Super Arena, Saitama
Referees: Ademir Zurapović (BIH), Luis Castillo (ESP), Takaki Kato (JPN)

28 July 2021
10:00
v

Boxscore

Nigeria	92–99	Germany
Scoring by quarter: 21–24, 29–26, 24–24, 18–25
Pts: Nwora 33; Rebs: Nwora 7 Asts: Emegano 6		Pts: Voigtmann 19; Rebs: Thiemann 10; Asts: Lô 9

Saitama Super Arena, Saitama
Referees: Omar Bermúdez (MEX), Mārtiņš Kozlovskis (LAT), Rabah Noujaim (LIB)

31 July 2021
13:40
v

Boxscore

Italy	80–71	Nigeria
Scoring by quarter: 29–17, 11–22, 16–24, 24–8
Pts: Melli 15; Rebs: Vitali 6 Asts: Fontecchio, Pajola 4		Pts: Metu 22; Rebs: Metu 10; Asts: Metu 3

Saitama Super Arena, Saitama
Referees: Antonio Conde (ESP), Roberto Vázquez (PUR), Takaki Kato (JPN)

=== Women's tournament ===
Nigeria women's basketball team qualified for the Olympics as one of two highest-ranked eligible squads from group A at the Belgrade meet of the 2020 FIBA Women's Olympic Qualifying Tournament, marking the country's recurrence to the sporting event after 16 years.

Team roster

A 15-player roster was announced on 6 July 2021. The final roster was released on 19 July 2021.

Nigeria national basketball team – 2020 Summer Olympics roster
Players
Coaches

Pos.	No.	Name	Age – Date of birth	Height	Club	Ctr.
F	0	Amy Okonkwo	24 – 26 August 1996	1.88 m (6 ft 2 in)	Uni Girona CB	(Spain)
C	3	Pallas Kunaiyi-Akpannah	23 – 12 July 1997	1.88 m (6 ft 2 in)	Faenza Basket Project	(Belgium)
G	4	Elizabeth Balogun	20 – 9 September 2000	1.85 m (6 ft 1 in)	Louisville Cardinals	(United States)
F	9	Aisha Mohammed	35 – 21 October 1985	1.93 m (6 ft 4 in)	Bashkimi Prizren	(Kosovo)
PG	10	Promise Amukamara	28 – 22 June 1993	1.75 m (5 ft 9 in)	Charnay BB	(France)
F	11	Adaora Elonu	31 – 28 April 1990	1.85 m (6 ft 1 in)	Nadezhda Orenburg	(Russia)
PF	21	Atonye Nyingifa	30 – 8 December 1990	1.83 m (6 ft 0 in)	CB Isla Única	(Spain)
C	22	Oderah Chidom	26 – 9 July 1995	1.93 m (6 ft 4 in)	Angers	(France)
PG	23	Ezinne Kalu	29 – 26 June 1992	1.73 m (5 ft 8 in)	Landerneau BB	(France)
C	25	Victoria Macaulay	30 – 7 August 1990	1.93 m (6 ft 4 in)	Bursa	(Turkey)
G	31	Erica Ogwumike	23 – 26 September 1997	1.75 m (5 ft 9 in)	Free agent
SF	52	Ify Ibekwe	31 – 5 October 1989	1.88 m (6 ft 2 in)	Free agent

Head coach

- (United States) Otis Hughley Jr.

Assistant coach(es)

- (United States) Roosevelt Cochran
- (United States) Jessie Kenlaw

Legend

- Club – describes last
  club before the tournament
- Age – describes age
  on 26 July 2021

Group play

Pos	Team	Pld	W	L	PF	PA	PD	Pts	Qualification
1	United States	3	3	0	260	223	+37	6	Quarterfinals
2	Japan (H)	3	2	1	245	239	+6	5	Quarterfinals
3	France	3	1	2	239	229	+10	4	Quarterfinals
4	Nigeria	3	0	3	217	270	−53	3	

Source: TOCOG and FIBA
Rules for classification: 1) classification points; 2) head-to-head results; 3) head-to-head game points difference; 4) head-to-head number of game points scored.
(H) Hosts

27 July 2021
13:40
v

Boxscore

Nigeria	72–81	United States
Scoring by quarter: 20–17, 12–27, 18–26, 22–11
Pts: Kalu 16; Rebs: Kunaiyi-Akpannah 9 Asts: Amukamara 4		Pts: Wilson 19; Rebs: Wilson 13; Asts: Bird 13

Saitama Super Arena, Saitama
Referees: Yu Jung (TPE), Scott Beker (AUS), Gizella Györgyi (NOR)

30 July 2021
17:20
v

Boxscore

France	87–62	Nigeria
Scoring by quarter: 18–12, 26–15, 23–15, 20–20
Pts: Gruda 14; Rebs: Gruda, Williams 9 Asts: Duchet 5		Pts: Amukamara 11; Rebs: three players 4 Asts: Amukamara, Kalu 3

Saitama Super Arena, Saitama
Referees: Scott Beker (AUS), Luis Castillo (ESP), Samir Abaakil (MAR)

2 August 2021
10:00
v

Boxscore

Nigeria	83–102	Japan
Scoring by quarter: 22–30, 16–21, 19–33, 26–18
Pts: Macaulay 18; Rebs: Chidom, Elonu 7 Asts: Nyingifa 8		Pts: Hayashi 23; Rebs: Akaho 7 Asts: Machida 15

Saitama Super Arena, Saitama
Referees: Juan Fernández (ARG), Andreia Silva (BRA), Yevgeniy Mikheyev (KAZ)

== Canoeing ==
=== Sprint ===
Nigeria qualified a single boat (women's C-1 200 m) for the Games by winning the gold medal at the 2019 African Games in Rabat, Morocco, marking the country's Olympic debut in this sporting discipline.

Athlete	Event	Heats		Quarterfinals		Semifinals		Final	
Athlete	Event	Time	Rank	Time	Rank	Time	Rank	Time	Rank
Ayomide Emmanuel Bello	Women's C-1 200 m	47.539	3 QF	47.326	3	Did not advance			

Qualification Legend: FA = Qualify to final (medal); FB = Qualify to final B (non-medal)

== Gymnastics ==
=== Artistic ===
Nigeria entered one artistic gymnast into the Olympic competition. Uche Eke booked a spot in the men's individual all-around and apparatus events by winning the bronze medal at the 2021 African Gymnastics Championships in Cairo, Egypt. This marks the country's Olympic debut in gymnastics.

Men

Athlete	Event	Qualification								Final							
Athlete	Event	Apparatus						Total	Rank	Apparatus						Total	Rank
Athlete	Event	F	PH	R	V	PB	HB	Total	Rank	F	PH	R	V	PB	HB	Total	Rank
Uche Eke	All-around	12.833	12.866	11.900	13.433	12.233	11.500	74.765	58	Did not advance							

== Rowing ==
Nigeria qualified one boat in the women's single sculls for the Games by finishing third in the B-final and securing the last of five berths available at the 2019 FISA African Olympic Qualification Regatta in Tunis, Tunisia.

Athlete	Event	Heats		Repechage		Quarterfinals		Semifinals		Final	
Athlete	Event	Time	Rank	Time	Rank	Time	Rank	Time	Rank	Time	Rank
Esther Toko	Women's single sculls	8:58.49	5 R	9:07.54	4 SE/F	Bye		9:07.70	3 FE	8:42.78	30

Qualification Legend: FA=Final A (medal); FB=Final B (non-medal); FC=Final C (non-medal); FD=Final D (non-medal); FE=Final E (non-medal); FF=Final F (non-medal); SA/B=Semifinals A/B; SC/D=Semifinals C/D; SE/F=Semifinals E/F; QF=Quarterfinals; R=Repechage

== Swimming ==
Nigeria received a universality invitation from FINA to send a top-ranked female swimmer in her respective individual events to the Olympics, based on the FINA Points System of June 28, 2021.

Athlete	Event	Heat		Semifinal		Final	
Athlete	Event	Time	Rank	Time	Rank	Time	Rank
Abiola Ogunbanwo	Women's 100 m freestyle	59.74	48	Did not advance			

== Table tennis ==
Nigeria entered four athletes into the table tennis competition at the Games. Olajide Omotayo, along with Olympic veterans Offiong Edem and Olufunke Oshonaike, scored a semifinal victories to occupy the available spots each in the men's and women's singles, respectively, at the 2020 African Olympic Qualification Tournament in Tunis, Tunisia. For Oshonaike, she set a historic record by becoming the first ever African woman to participate in seven editions of the Summer Olympic Games.

Athlete	Event	Preliminary	Round 1	Round 2	Round 3	Round of 16	Quarterfinals	Semifinals	Final / BM	
Athlete	Event	Opposition Result	Opposition Result	Opposition Result	Opposition Result	Opposition Result	Opposition Result	Opposition Result	Opposition Result	Rank
Quadri Aruna	Men's singles	Bye			Tsuboi (BRA); L 2–4	Did not advance				
Olajide Omotayo	Men's singles	Bye	Apolónia (POR); L 0–4	Did not advance						
Offiong Edem	Women's singles	Bye	Madarász (HUN); W 4–1	Zhang (USA); L 1–4	Did not advance					
Olufunke Oshonaike	Women's singles	Liu (USA); L 1–4	Did not advance							

== Taekwondo ==
Nigeria entered one athlete into the taekwondo competition at the Games for the first time since London 2012. Elizabeth Anyanacho secured a spot in the women's welterweight category (67 kg) with a top two finish at the 2020 African Qualification Tournament in Rabat, Morocco.

Athlete	Event	Round of 16	Quarterfinals	Semifinals	Repechage	Final / BM	
Athlete	Event	Opposition Result	Opposition Result	Opposition Result	Opposition Result	Opposition Result	Rank
Elizabeth Anyanacho	Women's −67 kg	Tatar (TUR); L 7–12	Did not advance				

== Wrestling ==
Nigeria qualified five wrestlers for each of the following classes into the Olympic competition. One of them finished among the top six to book an Olympic berth in the women's freestyle 57 kg at the 2019 World Championships, while four additional licenses were awarded to the Nigerian wrestlers, who progressed to the top two finals of their respective weight categories at the 2021 African & Oceania Qualification Tournament in Hammamet, Tunisia.

Key:

- VT (ranking points: 5–0 or 0–5) – Victory by fall.
- VB (ranking points: 5–0 or 0–5) – Victory by injury (VF for forfeit, VA for withdrawal or disqualification)
- PP (ranking points: 3–1 or 1–3) – Decision by points – the loser with technical points.
- PO (ranking points: 3–0 or 0–3) – Decision by points – the loser without technical points.
- ST (ranking points: 4–0 or 0–4) – Great superiority – the loser without technical points and a margin of victory of at least 8 (Greco-Roman) or 10 (freestyle) points.
- SP (ranking points: 4–1 or 1–4) – Technical superiority – the loser with technical points and a margin of victory of at least 8 (Greco-Roman) or 10 (freestyle) points.

Freestyle

Athlete	Event	Round of 16	Quarterfinal	Semifinal	Repechage	Final / BM	
Athlete	Event	Opposition Result	Opposition Result	Opposition Result	Opposition Result	Opposition Result	Rank
Ekerekeme Agiomor	Men's −86 kg	Punia (IND); L 1–4 ^{SP}	Did not advance				13
Adijat Idris	Women's −50 kg	Livach (UKR); L 0–4 ^{ST}	Did not advance				15
Odunayo Adekuoroye	Women's −57 kg	Nichita (MDA); L 0–5 ^{VT}	Did not advance				13
Aminat Adeniyi	Women's −62 kg	Koliadenko (UKR); L 0–5 ^{VT}	Did not advance				16
Blessing Oborududu	Women's −68 kg	Manolova (AZE); W 4–1 ^{SP}	Zhumanazarova (KGZ); W 3–1 ^{PP}	Soronzonbold (MGL); W 3–1 ^{PP}	Bye	Mensah (USA); L 1–3 ^{PP}	2nd place, silver medalist(s)
