= Nigeria at the 2004 Summer Olympics =

- IOC code: NGR
- NOC: Nigeria Olympic Committee
- Website: www.nigeriaolympiccommittee.org

in Athens
- Competitors: 72 in 10 sports
- Flag bearer: Mary Onyali-Omagbemi
- Medals Ranked 68th: Gold 0 Silver 0 Bronze 2 Total 2

Summer Olympics appearances (overview)
- 1952; 1956; 1960; 1964; 1968; 1972; 1976; 1980; 1984; 1988; 1992; 1996; 2000; 2004; 2008; 2012; 2016; 2020; 2024; 2028

Nigeria competed at the 2004 Summer Olympics in Athens, Greece, from 13 to 29 August 2004. This was the nation's thirteenth appearance at the Olympics, except the 1976 Summer Olympics in Montreal, because of the African boycott. Nigerian Olympic Committee sent a total of 72 athletes, 24 men and 48 women, to the Games to compete in 10 sports. For the first time in its Olympic history, Nigeria was represented by more female than male athletes. Women's basketball and women's football were the only team-based sports in which Nigeria had its representation at these Games. There was only a single competitor in men's freestyle wrestling.

Fifteen athletes from the Nigerian team had previously competed in Sydney, including five football players from the women's squad and Olympic silver medalist Enefiok Udo-Obong in the men's 4 × 400 m relay. At age 36, sprinter Mary Onyali-Omagbemi became the first Nigerian athlete to compete in fifth Olympic Games, while table tennis players Segun Toriola and Bose Kaffo followed Onyali's footsteps to fulfill their fourth Olympic bid in Athens. For being the oldest and most experienced athlete of the team, Onyali reprised her role to carry the Nigerian flag in the opening ceremony for the second time since 1996.

Nigeria left Athens with only two Olympic bronze medals, all from the men's 4 × 100 m relay (led by Deji Aliu) and 4 × 400 m relay teams (led by Udo-Obong).

== Medalists ==
Medal	Name	Sport	Event	Date
Bronze	Deji Aliu; Aaron Egbele; Uchenna Emedolu; Olusoji Fasuba	Athletics	Men's 4 × 100 m relay	August 28
Bronze	Musa Audu; James Godday; Enefiok Udo-Obong; Saul Weigopwa	Athletics	Men's 4 × 400 m relay	August 28

== Athletics ==
Nigerian athletes have so far achieved qualifying standards in the following athletics events (up to a maximum of 3 athletes in each event at the 'A' Standard, and 1 at the 'B' Standard).

Key

- Note–Ranks given for track events are within the athlete's heat only
- Q = Qualified for the next round
- q = Qualified for the next round as a fastest loser or, in field events, by position without achieving the qualifying target
- NR = National record
- N/A = Round not applicable for the event
- Bye = Athlete not required to compete in round

Men

Athlete	Event	Heat		Quarterfinal		Semifinal		Final	
Athlete	Event	Result	Rank	Result	Rank	Result	Rank	Result	Rank
Deji Aliu	100 m	10.39	1 Q	10.26	5	Did not advance			
Uchenna Emedolu	100 m	10.22	2 Q	10.15	3 Q	10.35	8	Did not advance	
Saul Weigopwa	400 m	45.59	3 q	—N/a		45.67	6	Did not advance	
Deji Aliu; Aaron Egbele; Uchenna Emedolu; Olusoji Fasuba	4 × 100 m relay	38.27	1 Q	—N/a				38.23	3rd place, bronze medalist(s)
Musa Audu; James Godday; Enefiok Udo-Obong; Saul Weigopwa	4 × 400 m relay	3:01.60	2 Q	—N/a				3:00.90	3rd place, bronze medalist(s)

Women

Athlete	Event	Heat		Quarterfinal		Semifinal		Final	
Athlete	Event	Result	Rank	Result	Rank	Result	Rank	Result	Rank
Mercy Nku	100 m	11.37	4 q	11.39	5	Did not advance			
Endurance Ojokolo	100 m	11.36	2 Q	11.35	5	Did not advance			
Mary Onyali-Omagbemi	200 m	23.37	6 q	23.75	8	Did not advance			
Gloria Kemasuode; Mercy Nku; Oludamola Osayomi; Endurance Ojokolo	4 × 100 m relay	43.00	4 q	—N/a				43.42	7
Christy Ekpukhon; Halimat Ismaila; Ngozi Cynthia Nwokocha; Gloria Amuche Nwosu	4 × 400 m relay	3:30.78	8	—N/a				Did not advance	

== Basketball ==
=== Women's tournament ===
Roster

The following is the Nigeria roster in the women's basketball tournament of the 2004 Summer Olympics.

Nigeria women's national basketball team – 2004 Summer Olympics roster
Players
Coaches

Pos.	No.	Name	Age – Date of birth	Height	Club	Ctr.
G	4	Umoh Itoro	27 – 21 February 1977	1.83 m (6 ft 0 in)	Clemson University	(United States)
F	5	Joanne Aluka	25 – 26 April 1979	1.81 m (5 ft 11 in)	GD Gafanha da Nazaré	(Portugal)
G	6	Mobolaji Akiode	22 – 12 May 1982	1.78 m (5 ft 10 in)	Pully Basket	(Switzerland)
G	7	Juliana Negedu	25 – 31 July 1979	1.85 m (6 ft 1 in)	Aris Thivas	(Greece)
F/C	8	Ugo Oha	22 – 18 July 1982	1.93 m (6 ft 4 in)	George Washington University	(United States)
F	9	Aisha Mohammed	18 – 21 October 1985	1.93 m (6 ft 4 in)	First Bank	(Nigeria)
G/F	10	Nguveren Iyorhe	23 – 9 June 1981	1.87 m (6 ft 2 in)	First Bank	(Nigeria)
F	11	Mfon Udoka	28 – 16 June 1976	1.88 m (6 ft 2 in)	Houston Comets	(United States)
F	12	Rashidat Sadiq	23 – 3 January 1981	1.88 m (6 ft 2 in)	University of Connecticut	(United States)
G	13	Mactabene Amachree	26 – 30 January 1978	1.90 m (6 ft 3 in)	Istanbul University	(Turkey)
C	14	Taiwo Rafiu	32 – 18 June 1972	1.82 m (6 ft 0 in)	Kookmni Bank	(Nigeria)
C	15	Linda Ogugua	26 – 12 April 1978	1.98 m (6 ft 6 in)	Biola University	(United States)

Head coach

- (Nigeria) Sam Vincent

Assistant coach(es)

- (Nigeria) Scott Nnaji

Legend

- (C) Team captain
- nat field describes country
  of last club
  before the tournament
- Age as of August 13, 2004

Group play

Pos	Team	Pld	W	L	PF	PA	PD	Pts	Qualification
1	Australia	5	5	0	418	313	+105	10	Quarterfinals
2	Russia	5	4	1	389	333	+56	9	Quarterfinals
3	Brazil	5	3	2	430	361	+69	8	Quarterfinals
4	Greece (H)	5	2	3	353	392	−39	7	Quarterfinals
5	Japan	5	1	4	381	485	−104	6	
6	Nigeria	5	0	5	335	422	−87	5	

Source: FIBA archive
Rules for classification: 1) points; 2) head-to-head points; 3) head-to-head goal average; 4) head-to-head number of points scored.
(H) Hosts

14 August 2004
9:00

Australia	85–73	Nigeria
Scoring by quarter: 20–18, 26–14, 16–12, 23–29
Pts: Batkovic, Taylor 11; Rebs: Batkovic 7 Asts: Fallon, Harrower 4		Pts: Udoka 26; Rebs: Amachree, Sadiq 8 Asts: Umoh 2

Helliniko Indoor Arena, Athens
Attendance: 302
Referees:
Philippe Leemann (France)
Valdu Suurkask (Estonia)

16 August 2004
11:15

Nigeria	73–79	Japan
Scoring by quarter: 22–22, 24–23, 16–20, 11–14
Pts: Udoka 19; Rebs: Udoka 16; Asts: Four players 1		Pts: Yano 21; Rebs: Kusuda, Yano 6 Asts: Kusuda, Hamaguchi 4

Olympic Indoor Hall, Athens
Attendance: 400
Referees:
Elizabeth Sisk (United States)
Dallas Pickering (New Zealand)

18 August 2004
16:45

Greece	83–68	Nigeria
Scoring by quarter: 30–15, 15–14, 20–15, 18–24
Pts: Kostaki 25; Rebs: Maltsi, Saregkou 8 Asts: Kostaki 4		Pts: Udoka 28; Rebs: Udoka 18; Asts: Amachree, Iyorhe 1

Helliniko Indoor Arena, Athens
Attendance: 2,300
Referees:
Scott Butler (Australia)
Nancy Ethier (Canada)

20 August 2004
22:15

Nigeria	63–82	Brazil
Scoring by quarter: 19–33, 15–14, 12–11, 17–24
Pts: Udoka 17; Rebs: Udoka 7 Asts: Amachree, Udoka 2		Pts: Castro Marques 26; Rebs: de Souza 8 Asts: Castro Marques 6

Helliniko Indoor Arena, Athens
Attendance: 2,500
Referees:
Mike Homsy (Canada)
Song Yangping (China)

22 August 2004
11:15

Nigeria	58–93	Russia
Scoring by quarter: 14–23, 17–20, 15–21, 12–29
Pts: Udoka 19; Rebs: Mohammed 8 Asts: Akiode, Umoh 3		Pts: Rakhmatulina 15; Rebs: Baranova 8 Asts: Karpova, Rakhmatulina 3

Helliniko Indoor Arena, Athens
Attendance: 382
Referees:
Dallas Pickering (New Zealand)
Shoko Suguro (Japan)

Classification match (11th–12th place)

24 August 2004
9:00

11th place

Nigeria	68–64	South Korea
Scoring by quarter: 16–16, 13–16, 21–12, 18–20
Pts: Udoka 21; Rebs: Mohammed 13; Asts: Umoh 2		Pts: Kim Y. 19; Rebs: Lee M. 12; Asts: Lee M. 7

Helliniko Indoor Arena, Athens
Attendance: 155
Referees:
Philippe Leemann (Switzerland)
Chantal Julien (France)

== Boxing ==
Nigeria sent seven boxers to Athens. Five lost their first matches, while the other two made it to the quarterfinals (one with two wins, the other with a bye and a win) before being defeated.

Athlete	Event	Round of 32	Round of 16	Quarterfinals	Semifinals	Final	
Athlete	Event	Opposition Result	Opposition Result	Opposition Result	Opposition Result	Opposition Result	Rank
Effiong Okon	Light flyweight	Pinto (ITA); L RSC	Did not advance				
Nestor Bolum	Bantamweight	Ngnitedem (GAB); W 23–17	Prasad (IND); W RSC	Petchkoom (THA); L 14–29	Did not advance		
Muideen Ganiyu	Featherweight	Bye	Ikgopoleng (BOT); W 25–16	Kim S-G (PRK); L 11–32	Did not advance		
Ahmed Sadiq	Lightweight	Kindelán (CUB); L RSC	Did not advance				
Isaac Ekpo	Light heavyweight	Haydarov (UZB); L 11–21	Did not advance				
Emmanuel Izonritei	Heavyweight	—N/a	Al Shami (SYR); L 17–30	Did not advance			
Gbenga Oluokun	Super heavyweight	—N/a	Cammarelle (ITA); L 13–29	Did not advance			

== Football ==
=== Women's tournament ===
The Nigerian team qualified for the Olympics after defeating Ghana on penalties and edging South Africa in a two-leg playoff.

Roster

Head coach: Mabo Ismaila

Nigeria named a squad of 18 players and 4 alternates for the tournament.

No.	Pos.	Player	Date of birth (age)	Caps	Goals	Club
1	GK	Precious Dede	18 January 1980 (aged 24)	12	0	(Nigeria Football Federation) Delta Queens
2	MF	Efioanwan Ekpo	25 January 1984 (aged 20)	20	3	(Nigeria Football Federation) Pelican Stars
3	DF	Felicia Eze	27 September 1974 (aged 29)			(Nigeria Football Federation) Delta Queens
4	FW	Perpetua Nkwocha	3 January 1976 (aged 28)	30	10	(Nigeria Football Federation) Pelican Stars
5	MF	Ajuma Ameh	1 December 1984 (aged 19)			(Nigeria Football Federation) Pelican Stars
6	DF	Faith Ikidi	28 February 1987 (aged 17)	2	0	(Nigeria Football Federation) Bayelsa Queens
7	FW	Stella Mbachu	16 April 1978 (aged 26)	55	25	(Chinese Football Association) Tianjin Teda F.C.
8	MF	Rita Nwadike (captain)	3 November 1974 (aged 29)			(Nigeria Football Federation) Rivers Angels
9	FW	Blessing Igbojionu	26 September 1982 (aged 21)			(Nigeria Football Federation) Pelican Stars
10	FW	Mercy Akide	26 August 1975 (aged 28)	78	0	(United States Soccer Federation) Hampton Roads Piranhas
11	FW	Vera Okolo	5 January 1985 (aged 19)	4	14	(Nigeria Football Federation) Delta Queens
12	DF	Celestina Onyeka	15 July 1984 (aged 20)			(Nigeria Football Federation) Pelican Stars
13	DF	Yinka Kudaisi	25 August 1975 (aged 28)			(Nigeria Football Federation) Pelican Stars
14	DF	Akudo Sabi	17 November 1986 (aged 17)	14	6	(Nigeria Football Federation) Bayelsa Queens
15	MF	Maureen Mmadu	7 May 1975 (aged 29)	68	0	(Norwegian Football Federation) Amazon Grimstad
16	FW	Nkechi Egbe	5 February 1978 (aged 26)	35	15	(Nigeria Football Federation) Delta Queens
17	DF	Chima Nwosu	12 May 1986 (aged 18)			(Nigeria Football Federation) Inneh Queens
18	GK	Ogechi Onyinanya	26 May 1985 (aged 19)			(Nigeria Football Federation) Pelican Stars

Group play

Pos	Team	Pld	W	D	L	GF	GA	GD	Pts	Qualification
1	Sweden	2	1	0	1	2	2	0	3	Qualified for the quarterfinals
2	Nigeria	2	1	0	1	2	2	0	3	Qualified for the quarterfinals
3	Japan	2	1	0	1	1	1	0	3	Qualified for the quarterfinals

August 14, 2004
18:00

Japan	0 – 1	Nigeria
	Report	Okolo 55'

Karaiskaki Stadium, Piraeus
Attendance: 14.126
Referee: Ferreira-James (Guyana)

August 17, 2004
18:00

Sweden	2 – 1	Nigeria
Marklund 68'; Moström 73'	Report	Akide 25'

Panthessaliko Stadium, Volos
Attendance: 21.597
Referee: de Oliveira (Brazil)

Quarterfinals

August 20, 2004
18:00

Germany	2 – 1	Nigeria
Jones 76'; Pohlers 81'	Report	Akide 49'

Pampeloponnisiako Stadium, Patras
Attendance: 2.531
Referee: D'Coth (India)

== Judo ==
Two Nigerian judoka (one man and one woman) qualified for the 2004 Summer Olympics.

Athlete	Event	Round of 32	Round of 16	Quarterfinals	Semifinals	Repechage 1	Repechage 2	Repechage 3	Final / BM	
Athlete	Event	Opposition Result	Opposition Result	Opposition Result	Opposition Result	Opposition Result	Opposition Result	Opposition Result	Opposition Result	Rank
Chukwuemeka Onyemachi	Men's +100 kg	Hernandes (BRA); L 0000–0100	Did not advance							
Catherine Ekuta	Women's −57 kg	Bye	Göldi (SUI); L 0000–1010	Did not advance						

== Swimming ==
Men

Athlete	Event	Heat		Semifinal		Final	
Athlete	Event	Time	Rank	Time	Rank	Time	Rank
Eric Williams	100 m breaststroke	1:07.69	53	Did not advance			

Women

Athlete	Event	Heat		Semifinal		Final	
Athlete	Event	Time	Rank	Time	Rank	Time	Rank
Lenient Obia	100 m backstroke	1:09.65	39	Did not advance			

== Table tennis ==
Eight Nigerian table tennis players qualified for the following events.

Men

Athlete	Event	Round 1	Round 2	Round 3	Round 4	Quarterfinals	Semifinals	Final / BM	
Athlete	Event	Opposition Result	Opposition Result	Opposition Result	Opposition Result	Opposition Result	Opposition Result	Opposition Result	Rank
Monday Merotohun	Singles	Babunugu (COD); W 4–0	Persson (SWE); L 1–4	Did not advance					
Segun Toriola	Singles	Tabachnik (ARG); W 4–1	Chila (FRA); L 2–4	Did not advance					
Peter Akinlabi; Kazeem Nosiru	Doubles	—N/a	Papic / Rodríguez (CHI); W 4–1	Maze / Tugwell (DEN); L 2–4	Did not advance				
Monday Merotohun; Segun Toriola	Doubles	—N/a	Hazinski / Lupulesku (USA); L 0–4	Did not advance					

Women

Athlete	Event	Round 1	Round 2	Round 3	Round 4	Quarterfinals	Semifinals	Final / BM	
Athlete	Event	Opposition Result	Opposition Result	Opposition Result	Opposition Result	Opposition Result	Opposition Result	Opposition Result	Rank
Cecilia Offiong	Singles	Silva (BRA); W 4–1	Kim Y-M (PRK); L 0–4	Did not advance					
Olufunke Oshonaike	Singles	Rodriguez (CHI); W 4–0	Tóth (HUN); L 2–4	Did not advance					
Offiong Edem; Cecilia Offiong	Doubles	Bye		Fadeyeva / Melnik (RUS); L 3–4	Did not advance				
Bose Kaffo; Olufunke Oshonaike	Doubles	Bye		Stefanova / Tan Wl (ITA); L 3–4	Did not advance				

== Taekwondo ==
Three Nigerian taekwondo jin qualified for the following events.

Athlete	Event	Round of 16	Quarterfinals	Semifinals	Repechage 1	Repechage 2	Final / BM	
Athlete	Event	Opposition Result	Opposition Result	Opposition Result	Opposition Result	Opposition Result	Opposition Result	Rank
Jacob Obiorah	Men's −80 kg	Hamdouni (TUN); L 11–16	Did not advance					
Chika Chukwumerije	Men's +80 kg	Gentil (FRA); L 0–2	Did not advance					
Princess Dudu	Women's +67 kg	Dawani (JOR); L 9–12	Did not advance					

== Weightlifting ==
Two Nigerian weightlifters qualified for the following events:

Athlete	Event	Snatch		Clean & Jerk		Total	Rank
Athlete	Event	Result	Rank	Result	Rank	Total	Rank
Blessed Udoh	Women's −48 kg	75	=12	105	=6	180	7
Franca Gbodo	Women's −58 kg	95	=6	117.5	=10	212.5	10

== Wrestling ==
Key:

- VT - Victory by Fall.
- PP - Decision by Points - the loser with technical points.
- PO - Decision by Points - the loser without technical points.

Men's freestyle

Athlete	Event	Elimination Pool			Quarterfinal	Semifinal	Final / BM	
Athlete	Event	Opposition Result	Opposition Result	Rank	Opposition Result	Opposition Result	Opposition Result	Rank
Fred Jessey	−66 kg	Baek J-K (KOR); L 1–3 ^{PP}	Ikematsu (JPN); L 0–5 ^{VT}	3	Did not advance			20

== See also ==
- Nigeria at the 2004 Summer Paralympics
