= Ajuma Ameh-Otache =

Nigerian footballer

Personal information
- Date of birth: 1 December 1984
- Place of birth: Nigeria
- Date of death: 10 November 2018 (aged 33)
- Position: Midfielder

Senior career*
Years	Team	Apps	(Gls)
- Pelican Stars

International career
- Nigeria
- * Club domestic league appearances and goals

Ajuma Ameh-Otache (1 December 1984 – 10 November 2018) was a Nigerian football midfielder and later a coach. She was part of the Nigeria women's national football team at the 2004 Summer Olympics. She also won the African Women's Cup of Nations that same year. At the club level, she played for Pelican Stars.

Ameh-Otache died on 10 November 2018 at the age of 33; no details for her cause of death have been given.

== See also ==
- Nigeria at the 2004 Summer Olympics
