= Theophilus Allotey =

Ghanaian boxer (born 2002)

Personal information
- Full name: Theophilus Nii Kpakpo Allotey
- Nationality: Ghanaian
- Born: 11 June 2002 (age 24)

Sport
- Sport: Boxing
Medal record
Men's amateur boxing
Representing Ghana
Olympic Qualifiers
Bronze medal – third place	2023 Dakar	Flyweight
African Games
Bronze medal – third place	2023 Accra	Flyweight

Theophilus Nii Kpakpo Allotey (born 11 June 2002) is a Ghanaian boxer. He started boxing at a very tender age and passed through the juvenile stage, Black Rocket before he was promoted to the senior level to be part of the Black Bombers.

In 2021, Allotey was selected to be part of Black Bombers, the Ghana boxing team.

In 2022, he won gold at the 2022 Individual Championships held at the Accra Sports Stadium and Bukom Boxing Arena. In June 2022, there were frustrations after he was left out of Ghana's squad for the 2022 Commonwealth Games in Birmingham. This was because the competition was also a selection event for the boxing team. These comments included ones from the coach of the Black Bombers, Kwasi Ofori Asare coming out publicly to say that Allotey was in the nine-member squad for the games, well endorsed by all stakeholders and therefore he had no idea why he had been dropped by the Ghana Boxing Federation.

He competed in the men's flyweight event at the 2023 African Boxing Olympic Qualification Tournament. He lost his semi-final bout with Ala Eddine Zidi and therefore lost a spot to qualify for the Olympics even though he secured a bronze medal by reaching the semi-finals.

In March 2024, Allotey competed in the 2024 World Boxing Olympic Qualification Tournament 1 in Italy. He competed in the 51 kg winning his first two bouts before being eliminated.

In 2024, He competed in the flyweight boxing category during the 2023 African Games hosted by Ghana. He was highly rated amongst the top boxers to possibly earn Ghana a gold medal but he fell short after being defeated by Olympic-bound Patrick Chinyemba in the semi-final. The defeat meant he had to settle for the bronze medal.

Allotey captured the WBO Africa Bantamweight championship in June 2025 and officially received his title belt that January. He also topped Ghana Boxing's pound-for-pound rankings and secured the EMY Africa Sports Personality award in 2025. By late 2025, he had broken into the WBO world rankings and advanced to No. 3 on the IBF intercontinental list, underscoring his rising global profile.
