= Nigeria at the 2012 Summer Olympics =

- IOC code: NGR
- NOC: Nigeria Olympic Committee
- Website: www.nigeriaolympiccommittee.org

in London
- Competitors: 53 in 8 sports
- Flag bearer: Sinivie Boltic
- Medals: Gold 0 Silver 0 Bronze 0 Total 0

Summer Olympics appearances (overview)
- 1952; 1956; 1960; 1964; 1968; 1972; 1976; 1980; 1984; 1988; 1992; 1996; 2000; 2004; 2008; 2012; 2016; 2020; 2024

Nigeria competed at the 2012 Summer Olympics in London, from 27 July to 12 August 2012. This was the nation's fifteenth appearance at the Olympics. Nigeria missed the 1976 Summer Olympics in Montreal because of the African boycott. The Nigerian Olympic Committee sent the nation's smallest delegation to the Games since 1984. A total of 53 athletes, 30 men and 23 women, competed in 8 sports. Men's basketball was the only team-based sport in which Nigeria was represented at these Olympic Games. Among the eight sports played by the athletes, Nigeria marked its official Olympic debut in slalom canoeing.

The Nigerian team featured two Olympic medalists from Beijing: taekwondo jin Chika Chukwumerije, who served as the nation's team captain, and long jumper Blessing Okagbare. Table tennis player Segun Toriola, the oldest member of the team, at age 37, became the first Nigerian athlete to compete in six Olympic games. Toriola's fellow table tennis player Olufunke Oshonaike made her fifth Olympic appearance, making her the nation's oldest and most experienced female athlete. Freestyle wrestler Sinivie Boltic was Nigeria's first male flag bearer at the opening ceremony since 2000.

Nigeria failed to win a single medal for the first time in Olympic history since 1988, after achieving poor athletic performance at these Games. Triple jumper Tosin Oke, the women's sprint relay team (led by Blessing Okagbare), and weightlifter Felix Ekpo qualified successfully for the final rounds of their respective events, but missed out of the medal standings. Following the athletes' lackluster performance, President Goodluck Jonathan "called for a complete overhaul of Nigerian sports administration". A few weeks after the Olympics, the Nigerian athletes, however, were able to recapture the nation's sporting success at the Paralympics, as they had earned a total of twelve medals, including six golds.

== Athletics ==
Nigerian athletes have so far achieved qualifying standards in the following athletics events (up to a maximum of 3 athletes in each event at the 'A' Standard, and 1 at the 'B' Standard):

Key

- Note–Ranks given for track events are within the athlete's heat only
- Q = Qualified for the next round
- q = Qualified for the next round as a fastest loser or, in field events, by position without achieving the qualifying target
- NR = National record
- N/A = Round not applicable for the event
- Bye = Athlete not required to compete in round

Men
Track & road events

Athlete	Event	Heat		Quarterfinal		Semifinal		Final	
Athlete	Event	Result	Rank	Result	Rank	Result	Rank	Result	Rank
Ogho-Oghene Egwero	100 m	Bye		10.38	6	did not advance			
Peter Emelieze	100 m	Bye		10.22	5	did not advance			
Obinna Joseph Metu	100 m	Bye		10.35	5	did not advance			
Noah Akwu	200 m	20.67	5	—N/a		did not advance			
Amaechi Morton	400 m hurdles	49.34	3 Q	—N/a		DSQ		did not advance	
Selim Nurudeen	110 m hurdles	13.51	2 Q	—N/a		13.55	5	did not advance	

Field events

Athlete	Event	Qualification		Final	
Athlete	Event	Distance	Position	Distance	Position
Stanley Gbageke	Long jump	7.59	27	did not advance	
Tosin Oke	Triple jump	16.83	9 q	16.95	7

Women
Track & road events

Athlete	Event	Heat		Quarterfinal		Semifinal		Final	
Athlete	Event	Result	Rank	Result	Rank	Result	Rank	Result	Rank
Seun Adigun	100 m hurdles	13.56	4	—N/a		did not advance			
Gloria Asumnu	100 m	Bye		11.13	3 Q	11.21	5	did not advance	
Gloria Asumnu	200 m	23.43	6	—N/a		did not advance			
Regina George	400 m	51.24	1 Q	—N/a		51.35	5	did not advance	
Muizat Ajoke Odumosu	400 m hurdles	54.93	3 Q	—N/a		54.40	1 Q	55.31	8
Blessing Okagbare	100 m	Bye		10.93	1 Q	10.92	1 Q	11.00	8
Omolara Omotosho	400 m	52.11	4 q	—N/a		51.41	4	did not advance	
Oludamola Osayomi	100 m	Bye		11.36	4	did not advance			
Christy Udoh	200 m	23.19	5	—N/a		did not advance			
Endurance Abinuwa; Gloria Asumnu; Blessing Okagbare; Oludamola Osayomi; Christy Udoh*	4 × 100 m relay	42.75	5 q	—N/a				42.64	4
Bukola Abogunloko; Regina George; Muizat Ajoke Odumosu; Omolara Omotosho; Idara Otu*	4 × 400 m relay	3:26.29	4 q	—N/a				DSQ	

Field events

Athlete	Event	Qualification		Final	
Athlete	Event	Distance	Position	Distance	Position
Doreen Amata	High jump	1.90	17	did not advance	
Blessing Okagbare	Long jump	6.34	17	did not advance	

Combined events – Heptathlon

Athlete	Event	100H	HJ	SP	200 m	LJ	JT	800 m	Final	Rank
Uhunoma Osazuwa	Result	13.46	1.77	12.77	24.62	5.74	DNS	—	DNF	
Uhunoma Osazuwa	Points	1056	941	712	922	771	0	—	DNF	

== Basketball ==
=== Men's tournament ===
Roster

The following is the Nigeria roster in the men's basketball tournament of the 2012 Summer Olympics.

Nigeria men's national basketball team – 2012 Summer Olympics roster
Players
Coaches

Pos.	No.	Name	Age – Date of birth	Height	Club
G	4	Tony Skinn	29 – February 8, 1983	6 ft 3 in (1.91 m)	Ironi Ashkelon
F	5	Ekene Ibekwe	27 – July 19, 1985	6 ft 11 in (2.11 m)	BBC Bayreuth
F	6	Ike Diogu	28 – September 11, 1983	6 ft 10 in (2.08 m)	Capitanes de Arecibo
F	7	Al-Farouq Aminu	21 – September 21, 1990	6 ft 9 in (2.06 m)	New Orleans Hornets
G	8	Ade Dagunduro	26 – May 22, 1986	6 ft 5 in (1.96 m)	Stella Artois Leuven Bears
G	9	Chamberlain Oguchi	26 – April 28, 1986	6 ft 6 in (1.98 m)	Panteras de Miranda
F	10	Koko Archibong	30 – October 5, 1981	6 ft 9 in (2.06 m)	LTi Giessen 46ers
G	11	Richard Oruche	24 – August 30, 1987	6 ft 4 in (1.93 m)	Académica Coimbra
F	12	Ejike Ugboaja	27 – May 28, 1985	6 ft 9 in (2.06 m)	Jahesh Tarabar Qom
G	13	Derrick Obasohan	31 – April 18, 1981	6 ft 6 in (1.98 m)	Joventut Badalona
C	14	Alade Aminu	24 – September 14, 1987	6 ft 11 in (2.11 m)	Élan Chalon
C	15	Olumide Oyedeji	31 – May 11, 1981	6 ft 11 in (2.11 m)	Qingdao Double Star

Head coach

- Ayo Bakare

Legend

- Club – describes last
  club before the tournament
- Age – describes age
  on 29 July 2012

Group play

Pos	Team	Pld	W	L	PF	PA	PD	Pts	Qualification
1	United States	5	5	0	589	398	+191	10	Quarterfinals
2	France	5	4	1	376	378	−2	9	Quarterfinals
3	Argentina	5	3	2	448	424	+24	8	Quarterfinals
4	Lithuania	5	2	3	395	399	−4	7	Quarterfinals
5	Nigeria	5	1	4	338	456	−118	6	
6	Tunisia	5	0	5	320	411	−91	5	

Source: FIBA archive
Rules for classification: 1) points; 2) head-to-head points; 3) head-to-head goal average; 4) head-to-head number of points scored.

29 July 2012
09:00

Report

Nigeria	60–56	Tunisia
Scoring by quarter: 18–7, 13–8, 14–16, 15–25
Pts: Aminu 15; Rebs: Diogu 10; Asts: Skinn 3		Pts: Rzig 18; Rebs: Ben Romdhane 12; Asts: three players 3

Basketball Arena, London
Referees: Ilija Belošević (SRB), Marcos Benito (BRA), Rabah Noujaim (LIB)

31 July 2012
14:30

Report

Lithuania	72–53	Nigeria
Scoring by quarter: 14–8, 20–19, 22–13, 16–13
Pts: Songaila 12; Rebs: Kleiza 6 Asts: Jasikevičius 9		Pts: Diogu, Al. Aminu 12; Rebs: Al. Aminu 11; Asts: Al. Aminu 2

Basketball Arena, London
Referees: Cristiano Maranho (BRA), Stephen Seibel (CAN), Vitalis Gode (KEN)

2 August 2012
22:15

Report

United States	156–73	Nigeria
Scoring by quarter: 49–25, 29–20, 41–17, 37–11
Pts: Anthony 37; Rebs: Davis, Love 6 Asts: Williams 11		Pts: Diogu 27; Rebs: Diogu 7 Asts: Aminu 4

Basketball Arena, London
Referees: Juan Arteaga (ESP), Robert Lottermoser (GER), Elena Chernova (RUS)

4 August 2012
22:15

Report

Nigeria	79–93	Argentina
Scoring by quarter: 19–37, 18–20, 20–19, 22–17
Pts: Diogu 16; Rebs: Diogu 11; Asts: Aminu 5		Pts: Scola 22; Rebs: Nocioni 6 Asts: Ginóbili 8

Basketball Arena, London
Referees: Cristiano Maranho (BRA), Michael Aylen (AUS), Samir Abaakil (MAR)

6 August 2012
14:30

Report

France	79–73	Nigeria
Scoring by quarter: 23–10, 18–20, 15–24, 23–19
Pts: Batum 23; Rebs: Batum, Diaw 6 Asts: Parker 7		Pts: Oguchi 35; Rebs: Diogu, A. Aminu 7 Asts: four players 2

Basketball Arena, London
Referees: Recep Ankaralı (TUR), Michael Aylen (AUS), Rabah Noujaim (LIB)

== Boxing ==
Nigeria has so far qualified boxers for the following events

Men

Athlete	Event	Round of 32	Round of 16	Quarterfinals	Semifinals	Final	
Athlete	Event	Opposition Result	Opposition Result	Opposition Result	Opposition Result	Opposition Result	Rank
Muideen Olalekan Akanji	Middleweight	O'Neill (IRL); L 6–15	did not advance				
Lukmon Olaiwola Lawal	Light heavyweight	Al-Matbouli (JOR); L 7–19	did not advance				

Women

Athlete	Event	Round of 16	Quarterfinals	Semifinals	Final	
Athlete	Event	Opposition Result	Opposition Result	Opposition Result	Opposition Result	Rank
Edith Ogoke	Middleweight	Vystropova (AZE); W 14–12	Torlopova (RUS); L 8–18	did not advance		

== Canoeing ==
=== Slalom ===
Nigeria has qualified boats for the following events

Athlete	Event	Preliminary						Semifinal		Final	
Athlete	Event	Run 1	Rank	Run 2	Rank	Total	Rank	Time	Rank	Time	Rank
Jonathan Akinyemi	Men's K-1	104.70	20	146.95	21	104.70	21	did not advance			

== Table tennis ==
Nigeria has so far qualified two men and two women.

Athlete	Event	Preliminary round	Round 1	Round 2	Round 3	Round 4	Quarterfinals	Semifinals	Final / BM	
Athlete	Event	Opposition Result	Opposition Result	Opposition Result	Opposition Result	Opposition Result	Opposition Result	Opposition Result	Opposition Result	Rank
Quadri Aruna	Men's singles	Bye	Machado (ESP); W 4–2	Vang (TUR); L 2–4	did not advance					
Segun Toriola	Men's singles	Ho (CAN); W 4–1	Persson (SWE); L 1–4	did not advance						
Offiong Edem	Women's singles	Meshref (EGY); L 2–4	did not advance							
Olufunke Oshonaike	Women's singles	Shahsavari (IRI); W 4–3	Tan (ITA); L 0–4	did not advance						

== Taekwondo ==
Nigeria has qualified 2 athletes.

Athlete	Event	Round of 16	Quarterfinals	Semifinals	Repechage	Bronze Medal	Final	
Athlete	Event	Opposition Result	Opposition Result	Opposition Result	Opposition Result	Opposition Result	Opposition Result	Rank
Isah Adam Muhammad	Men's −68 kg	Abu-Libdeh (JOR); L 1–13	did not advance					
Chika Chukwumerije	Men's +80 kg	Despaigne (CUB); L 0–1	did not advance					

== Weightlifting ==
Nigeria has qualified the following quota places.

Athlete	Event	Snatch		Clean & Jerk		Total	Rank
Athlete	Event	Result	Rank	Result	Rank	Total	Rank
Felix Ekpo	Men's −77 kg	151	7	180	8	331	8
Mariam Usman	Women's +75 kg	129	3	~~160~~	DNF	129	DNF

== Wrestling ==
Nigeria has qualified the following quota places.

Key:

- VT - Victory by Fall.
- PP - Decision by Points - the loser with technical points.
- PO - Decision by Points - the loser without technical points.

Men's freestyle

Athlete	Event	Qualification	Round of 16	Quarterfinal	Semifinal	Repechage 1	Repechage 2	Final / BM	
Athlete	Event	Opposition Result	Opposition Result	Opposition Result	Opposition Result	Opposition Result	Opposition Result	Opposition Result	Rank
Andrew Dick	−84 kg	Bye	Espinal (PUR); L 1–3 ^{PP}	did not advance		Bye	Marsagishvili (GEO); L 0–5 ^{VB}	Did not advance	18
Sinivie Boltic	−96 kg	Bye	Ceban (MDA); L 1–3 ^{PP}	did not advance					14

Women's freestyle

Athlete	Event	Qualification	Round of 16	Quarterfinal	Semifinal	Repechage 1	Repechage 2	Final / BM	
Athlete	Event	Opposition Result	Opposition Result	Opposition Result	Opposition Result	Opposition Result	Opposition Result	Opposition Result	Rank
Blessing Oborududu	−63 kg	Bye	Michalik (POL); L 0–3 ^{PO}	did not advance					19
Amarachi Obiajunwa	−72 kg	Bye	Wang J (CHN); L 0–5 ^{VT}	did not advance					15

== See also ==
- Nigeria at the 2012 Summer Paralympics
