= Dean Lukin =

Australian weightlifter (born 1960)

Personal information
- Full name: Dinko Lukin
- Born: 26 May 1960 (age 66) Sydney, New South Wales, Australia
- Height: 180 cm (5 ft 11 in)
- Weight: 138 kg (304 lb)

Sport
- Sport: Weightlifting
- Event: +110 kg Clean and jerk
Medal record
Men's weightlifting
Representing Australia
Olympic Games
Gold medal – first place	1984 Los Angeles	+110 kg
Commonwealth Games
Gold medal – first place	1982 Brisbane	+110 kg
Gold medal – first place	1986 Edinburgh	+110 kg
- Updated on 29 May 2015

Dinko "Dean" Lukin, OAM (born 26 May 1960) is an Australian retired weightlifter. Lukin won the gold medal in the Super Heavyweight category at the 1984 Summer Olympics, held in Los Angeles. He carried the Australian flag during the closing ceremony of the 1984 games, and remains Australia's only Olympic gold medallist for weightlifting. He also saw success in the Commonwealth Games, winning gold medals in the super heavyweight division of the 1982 Brisbane games and the 1986 Edinburgh games.

Lukin was born in Sydney, but his family moved to the South Australian town of Port Lincoln when he was five years old. Lukin was a tuna fisherman who shot to fame as a weightlifter in the 1980s, then returned to run the family fishing business. In 2000, a portrait of him was hung in the Archibald Prize called Strongest Man of the Games, painted by David Bromley.

In a press conference following his 1984 Los Angeles Olympics gold medal, Lukin reportedly told assembled journalists that instead of focusing upon his victory, they should assemble for the disabled games and show those competitors as much time and respect as they had shown him. This was because their achievements were "far greater than mine".

In a bid to get healthier during the late 1980s, Lukin went on a diet and lost a lot of the weight that made him one of the top Super Heavyweight weightlifters in the world, claiming that his waist was now the size that his upper thighs were during the 1984 Olympic Games.

Lukin was inducted into the Sport Australia Hall of Fame in 1985.
