= Serafim Grammatikopoulos =

Greek weightlifter (born 1960)

Personal information
- Nationality: Greek
- Born: 8 July 1960 (age 64)

Sport
- Sport: Weightlifting

Serafim Grammatikopoulos (born 8 July 1960) is a Greek weightlifter. He competed in the men's super heavyweight event at the 1984 Summer Olympics.
