= Nigeria at the 1964 Summer Olympics =

- IOC code: NGR (NGA used at these Games)
- NOC: Nigeria Olympic Committee

in Tokyo
- Medals Ranked 35th: Gold 0 Silver 0 Bronze 1 Total 1

Summer Olympics appearances (overview)
- 1952; 1956; 1960; 1964; 1968; 1972; 1976; 1980; 1984; 1988; 1992; 1996; 2000; 2004; 2008; 2012; 2016; 2020; 2024; 2028

Nigeria competed at the 1964 Summer Olympics in Tokyo, Japan. This was the first time participating as an independent nation as well as winning its first Olympic medal.

== Medalists ==
=== Bronze ===
- Nojim Maiyegun Boxing, Men's Light Middleweight
