= Chima Nwosu =

Nigerian footballer

Personal information
- Date of birth: 12 May 1986 (age 40)
- Place of birth: Nigeria
- Position: Defender

Senior career*
Years	Team	Apps	(Gls)
2004	Inneh Queens		

International career
2004	Nigeria	0 (?)	(0)
- * Club domestic league appearances and goals

Chima Nwosu // (born 12 May 1986) is a Nigerian former football defender who has played for the Nigeria women's national team.

She was part of the national team at the 2004 Summer Olympics. At the club level, she played for Inneh Queens.

== See also ==
- Nigeria at the 2004 Summer Olympics
