= Stefan Laggner =

Austrian weightlifter

Personal information
- Nationality: Austrian
- Born: 17 September 1958 (age 66)

Sport
- Sport: Weightlifting

Stefan Laggner (born 17 September 1958) is an Austrian weightlifter. He competed in the men's super heavyweight event at the 1984 Summer Olympics.
