= Mosad Mosbah =

Egyptian weightlifter

Personal information
- Nationality: Egyptian
- Born: 20 September 1957 (age 67)

Sport
- Sport: Weightlifting

Mosad Mosbah (born 20 September 1957) is an Egyptian weightlifter. He competed in the men's super heavyweight event at the 1984 Summer Olympics.
