= Ironbar Bassey =

Nigerian weightlifter

Personal information
- Full name: Bassey Etim Ironbar
- Nationality: Nigerian
- Born: 25 December 1965 (age 59)

Sport
- Sport: Weightlifting

Ironbar Bassey (born 25 December 1965) is a Nigerian weightlifter. He competed in the men's super heavyweight event at the 1984 Summer Olympics.
