= Nigeria at the 1960 Summer Olympics =

- IOC code: NGR (NIG used at these Games)
- NOC: Nigeria Olympic Committee

in Rome
- Medals: Gold 0 Silver 0 Bronze 0 Total 0

Summer Olympics appearances (overview)
- 1952; 1956; 1960; 1964; 1968; 1972; 1976; 1980; 1984; 1988; 1992; 1996; 2000; 2004; 2008; 2012; 2016; 2020; 2024

Nigeria competed at the 1960 Summer Olympics in Rome, Italy. This was the last participation of the nation right before gaining independence in October the same year.

== Summary by Sport ==
=== Athletics ===
Games	Athletes
100 metres, Men	1
200 metres, Men	1
400 metres, Men	1
110 metres Hurdles, Men	1
4 × 100 metres Relay, Men	5
High Jump, Men	1
Pole Vault, Men	1
Long Jump, Men	1
Triple Jump, Men	1

=== Boxing ===
Games	Athletes
Flyweight, Men	1
Bantamweight, Men	1
Featherweight, Men	1
Welterweight, Men	1
