= Batholomew Oluoma =

Nigerian weightlifter

Personal information
- Nationality: Nigerian
- Born: 5 October 1957 (age 67)

Sport
- Sport: Weightlifting

Batholomew Oluoma (born 5 October 1957) is a Nigerian weightlifter. He competed in the men's super heavyweight event at the 1984 Summer Olympics.
