= Johnathan Akinyemi =

Nigerian slalom canoeist (born 1988)

Jonathan Peter Akinyemi
- Akinyemi
- Born: 22 November 1988 (age 37); England

Johnathan Peter Akinyemi(born 22 November 1988 in Warrington, England) is a British-Nigerian slalom canoeist who competed at the international level from 2006 to 2016. He competed for Great Britain as a junior in 2006 and then represented Nigeria from 2007 onwards.

At the 2012 Summer Olympics he competed in the K1 event, finishing 21st in the heats, failing to qualify for the semifinals. He finished in 20th place in the same event at the 2016 Summer Olympics in Rio de Janeiro.

== Individual Podiums at African Championships ==
Season	Date	Venue	Position	Event
2008	27 January 2008	Sagana	2nd	K1^{1}
2009	1 October 2009	Cradock	1st	K1
2012	3rd & 4th February 2012	Bethlehem	1st	K1
2013	October 2013	Sagana	1st	K1
2015	6-8 November 2015	Sagana	1st	K1

^{1} African Championship counting for World Cup points

== Olympic Games ==
Olympic Games	Sport	Class/Event	Position
London 2012	Canoe Slalom	K1M	21st
Rio 2016	Canoe Slalom	K1M	20th
