= Olaitan Adam Olaore =

Nigerian male boxer

Olaitan Adam Olaore (born in Lagos, Nigeria) is a Nigerian-born British amateur boxer. He is known for winning the gold medal at the 2024 Africa Boxing Qualifiers in Dakar, Senegal.

== Early life and background ==
Olaore was born in Lagos, Nigeria, and grew up in Ogun State before relocating to the United Kingdom at the age of six. His family initially settled in Peckham, southeast London, before moving to Newcastle when Olaore was twelve. He began boxing at the age of twelve after discovering a local boxing gym.

== Boxing career ==
Olaore began boxing at a young age, winning the 2020 English Youth title and the British Championship. He later chose to represent Nigeria rather than the United Kingdom. In 2023, he won the African Boxing Championship in Cameroon. In 2024, he secured a spot in the Paris 2024 Olympics by winning the gold medal in the men's 92 kg division at the Africa Boxing Qualifiers in Dakar, Senegal.
