= Football at the 2004 Summer Olympics – Women's team squads =

The women's football tournament at the 2004 Summer Olympics in Athens was held from 11 to 26 August 2004. The women's tournament was a full international tournament with no restrictions on age. The ten national teams involved in the tournament were required to register a squad of 18 players, including two goalkeepers. Additionally, teams could name a maximum of four alternate players, numbered from 19 to 22. The alternate list could contain at most three outfielders, as at least one slot was reserved for a goalkeeper. In the event of serious injury during the tournament, an injured player could be replaced by one of the players in the alternate list. Only players in these squads were eligible to take part in the tournament.

The age listed for each player is on 11 August 2004, the first day of the tournament. The numbers of caps and goals listed for each player do not include any matches played after the start of the tournament. The club listed is the club for which the player last played a competitive match prior to the tournament.

== Group E ==
=== Japan ===
Head coach: Eiji Ueda

Japan named a squad of 18 players and 4 alternates for the tournament.

No.	Pos.	Player	Date of birth (age)	Caps	Goals	Club
1	GK	Nozomi Yamago	16 January 1975 (aged 29)	58	0	(Japan Football Association) Saitama Reinas
2	DF	Kyoko Yano	3 June 1984 (aged 20)	7	1	(Japan Football Association) Kanagawa University
3	DF	Hiromi Isozaki (captain)	22 December 1975 (aged 28)	52	4	(Japan Football Association) Tasaki Perule
4	DF	Yumi Obe	15 February 1975 (aged 29)	78	7	(Japan Football Association) YKK AP Tohoku Flappers
5	DF	Naoko Kawakami	16 November 1977 (aged 26)	31	0	(Japan Football Association) Tasaki Perule
6	MF	Tomoe Sakai	27 May 1978 (aged 26)	54	2	(Japan Football Association) NTV Beleza
7	MF	Emi Yamamoto	9 March 1982 (aged 22)	11	0	(Japan Football Association) Tasaki Perule
8	MF	Tomomi Miyamoto	31 December 1978 (aged 25)	48	9	(Japan Football Association) Kunoichi
9	FW	Eriko Arakawa	30 October 1979 (aged 24)	12	5	(Japan Football Association) NTV Beleza
10	FW	Homare Sawa	6 September 1978 (aged 25)	79	48	(Japan Football Association) NTV Beleza
11	FW	Mio Otani	5 May 1979 (aged 25)	37	23	(Japan Football Association) Tasaki Perule
12	DF	Yasuyo Yamagishi	28 November 1979 (aged 24)	45	6	(Japan Football Association) Kunoichi
13	DF	Aya Shimokozuru	7 June 1982 (aged 22)	0	0	(Japan Football Association) Speranza
14	FW	Karina Maruyama	26 March 1983 (aged 21)	16	6	(Japan Football Association) Nippon Sport Science University
15	MF	Miyuki Yanagita	11 April 1981 (aged 23)	25	3	(Japan Football Association) Tasaki Perule
16	MF	Yayoi Kobayashi	18 September 1981 (aged 22)	43	11	(Japan Football Association) NTV Beleza
17	MF	Kozue Ando	9 July 1982 (aged 22)	0	0	(Japan Football Association) Saitama Reinas
18	GK	Shiho Onodera	18 November 1973 (aged 30)	43	11	(Japan Football Association) NTV Beleza

Unenrolled alternate players
No.	Pos.	Player	Date of birth (age)	Caps	Goals	Club
19	DF	Yuka Miyazaki	13 October 1983 (aged 20)	16	2	(Japan Football Association) Iga FC Kunoichi
20	MF	Yukari Kinga	2 May 1984 (aged 20)	0	0	(Japan Football Association) Nippon TV Beleza
21	FW	Tomoko Suzuki	26 January 1982 (aged 22)	2	2	(Japan Football Association) Tasaki Perule FC
22	GK	Miho Fukumoto	2 October 1983 (aged 20)	2	0	(Japan Football Association) Okayama Yunogo Belle

=== Nigeria ===
Head coach: Mabo Ismaila

Nigeria named a squad of 18 players and 4 alternates for the tournament.

No.	Pos.	Player	Date of birth (age)	Caps	Goals	Club
1	GK	Precious Dede	18 January 1980 (aged 24)	12	0	(Nigeria Football Federation) Delta Queens
2	MF	Efioanwan Ekpo	25 January 1984 (aged 20)	20	3	(Nigeria Football Federation) Pelican Stars
3	DF	Felicia Eze	27 September 1974 (aged 29)			(Nigeria Football Federation) Delta Queens
4	FW	Perpetua Nkwocha	3 January 1976 (aged 28)	30	10	(Nigeria Football Federation) Pelican Stars
5	MF	Ajuma Ameh	1 December 1984 (aged 19)			(Nigeria Football Federation) Pelican Stars
6	DF	Faith Ikidi	28 February 1987 (aged 17)	2	0	(Nigeria Football Federation) Bayelsa Queens
7	FW	Stella Mbachu	16 April 1978 (aged 26)	55	25	(Chinese Football Association) Tianjin Teda F.C.
8	MF	Rita Nwadike (captain)	3 November 1974 (aged 29)			(Nigeria Football Federation) Rivers Angels
9	FW	Blessing Igbojionu	26 September 1982 (aged 21)			(Nigeria Football Federation) Pelican Stars
10	FW	Mercy Akide	26 August 1975 (aged 28)	78	0	(United States Soccer Federation) Hampton Roads Piranhas
11	FW	Vera Okolo	5 January 1985 (aged 19)	4	14	(Nigeria Football Federation) Delta Queens
12	DF	Celestina Onyeka	15 July 1984 (aged 20)			(Nigeria Football Federation) Pelican Stars
13	DF	Yinka Kudaisi	25 August 1975 (aged 28)			(Nigeria Football Federation) Pelican Stars
14	DF	Akudo Sabi	17 November 1986 (aged 17)	14	6	(Nigeria Football Federation) Bayelsa Queens
15	MF	Maureen Mmadu	7 May 1975 (aged 29)	68	0	(Norwegian Football Federation) Amazon Grimstad
16	FW	Nkechi Egbe	5 February 1978 (aged 26)	35	15	(Nigeria Football Federation) Delta Queens
17	DF	Chima Nwosu	12 May 1986 (aged 18)			(Nigeria Football Federation) Inneh Queens
18	GK	Ogechi Onyinanya	26 May 1985 (aged 19)			(Nigeria Football Federation) Pelican Stars

Unenrolled alternate players
No.	Pos.	Player	Date of birth (age)	Caps	Goals	Club
19	MF	Stella Godwin	12 April 1986 (aged 18)			(Danish Football Association) Odense BK
20	MF	Gift Otuwe	15 July 1984 (aged 20)			(Nigeria Football Federation) Bayelsa Queens
21	MF	Gloria Usieta	19 June 1977 (aged 27)			
22	GK	Elizabeth Johnson	17 September 1984 (aged 19)			(Nigeria Football Federation) Delta Queens

=== Sweden ===
Head coach: Marika Domanski-Lyfors

Sweden named a squad of 18 players and 4 alternates for the tournament.

No.	Pos.	Player	Date of birth (age)	Caps	Goals	Club
1	GK	Caroline Jönsson	22 November 1977 (aged 26)	55	0	(Swedish Football Association) Malmö FF Dam
2	DF	Karolina Westberg	16 May 1978 (aged 26)	98	0	(Swedish Football Association) Malmö FF Dam
3	DF	Jane Törnqvist	9 May 1975 (aged 29)	96	11	(Swedish Football Association) Djurgårdens IF Dam
4	DF	Hanna Marklund	26 November 1977 (aged 26)	76	4	(Swedish Football Association) Umeå IK
5	DF	Kristin Bengtsson	12 January 1970 (aged 34)	138	14	(Swedish Football Association) Djurgårdens IF Dam
6	MF	Malin Moström	1 August 1975 (aged 29)	85	16	(Swedish Football Association) Umeå IK
7	DF	Sara Larsson	13 May 1979 (aged 25)	43	3	(Swedish Football Association) Malmö FF Dam
8	DF	Frida Östberg	10 December 1977 (aged 26)	24	1	(Swedish Football Association) Umeå IK
9	MF	Malin Andersson (captain)	4 May 1973 (aged 31)	139	38	(Swedish Football Association) Malmö FF Dam
10	FW	Hanna Ljungberg	8 January 1979 (aged 25)	98	55	(Swedish Football Association) Umeå IK
11	FW	Victoria Svensson	18 May 1977 (aged 27)	102	39	(Swedish Football Association) Djurgårdens IF Dam
12	FW	Josefine Öqvist	23 July 1983 (aged 21)	19	4	(Swedish Football Association) Bälinge IF
13	MF	Lotta Schelin	27 February 1984 (aged 20)	4	0	(Swedish Football Association) Kopparberg/Göteborg FC
14	MF	Linda Fagerström	17 March 1977 (aged 27)	83	7	(Swedish Football Association) Djurgårdens IF Dam
15	MF	Therese Sjögran	8 April 1977 (aged 27)	75	6	(Swedish Football Association) Malmö FF Dam
16	FW	Salina Olsson	29 August 1978 (aged 25)	47	9	(Swedish Football Association) Hammarby IF DFF
17	MF	Anna Sjöström	23 April 1977 (aged 27)	39	4	(Swedish Football Association) Umeå IK
18	GK	Hedvig Lindahl	29 October 1983 (aged 20)	6	0	(Swedish Football Association) Linköping FC

Unenrolled alternate players
No.	Pos.	Player	Date of birth (age)	Caps	Goals	Club
19	MF	Frida Nordin	23 May 1982 (aged 22)			(Swedish Football Association) Malmö FF
20	DF	Sara Thunebro	26 April 1979 (aged 25)			(Swedish Football Association) Djurgården/Älvsjö
21	DF	Anna-Maria Eriksson	6 December 1976 (aged 27)	18	5	(Norwegian Football Federation) Kolbotn
22	GK	Maja Åström	14 December 1982 (aged 21)			(Swedish Football Association) Djurgården/Älvsjö

== Group F ==
=== China PR ===
Head coach: Zhang Haitao

China PR named a squad of 18 players and 4 alternates for the tournament.

No.	Pos.	Player	Date of birth (age)	Caps	Goals	Club
1	GK	Xiao Zhen	16 September 1976 (aged 27)			(Chinese Football Association) Sichuan Guancheng
2	DF	Jin Xiaomei	1 January 1983 (aged 21)			(Chinese Football Association) Shandong Luneng
3	DF	Li Jie	8 July 1979 (aged 25)	45	3	(Chinese Football Association) Beijing Chengjiang
4	DF	Wang Liping	12 November 1973 (aged 30)	156	6	(Chinese Football Association) Shijiazhuang Tiangong
5	DF	Fan Yunjie (captain)	29 April 1972 (aged 32)	176	16	(Chinese Football Association) Henan Jianye
6	MF	Pu Wei	20 August 1980 (aged 23)	67	20	(Chinese Football Association) Shanghai Zhongyuan
7	FW	Zhang Ouying	2 November 1975 (aged 28)	80	20	(Chinese Football Association) Shijiazhuang Tiangong
8	MF	Bi Yan	17 February 1984 (aged 20)	20	1	(Chinese Football Association) Dalian Shide
9	FW	Han Duan	15 June 1983 (aged 21)	35	20	(Chinese Football Association) Dalian Shide
10	DF	Teng Wei	21 May 1974 (aged 30)	20	12	(Chinese Football Association) Beijing Chengjiang
11	FW	Bai Lili	29 October 1978 (aged 25)			(Chinese Football Association) Shanghai Zhongyuan
12	MF	Qu Feifei	18 May 1982 (aged 22)	35	12	(Chinese Football Association) Liberation Army
13	FW	Liu Huana	17 May 1981 (aged 23)			(Chinese Football Association) Shaanxi Guoli
14	DF	Shi Dan	3 December 1980 (aged 23)			(Chinese Football Association) Liberation Army
15	DF	Ren Liping	21 October 1978 (aged 25)	40	12	(Chinese Football Association) Beijing Chengjiang
16	MF	Zhang Ying	27 June 1985 (aged 19)			(Chinese Football Association) Shanghai Zhongyuan
17	FW	Ji Ting	11 October 1982 (aged 21)			(Chinese Football Association) Shanghai Zhongyuan
18	GK	Gao Yingying	17 September 1981 (aged 22)			(Chinese Football Association) Shandong

Unenrolled alternate players
No.	Pos.	Player	Date of birth (age)	Caps	Goals	Club
19	DF	Zhong Jinyu	5 April 1983 (aged 21)			(Chinese Football Association) Guangdong Haiyin
20	DF	Liu Yali	9 February 1980 (aged 24)	22	1	
21	DF	Wang Kun	20 October 1985 (aged 18)			
22	GK	Ning Zhenyun	4 October 1979 (aged 24)			(Chinese Football Association) Jiangsu Suning

=== Germany ===
Head coach: Tina Theune-Meyer

Germany named a squad of 18 players and 4 alternates for the tournament.

No.	Pos.	Player	Date of birth (age)	Caps	Goals	Club
1	GK	Silke Rottenberg	25 January 1972 (aged 32)	90	0	(German Football Association) FCR Duisburg
2	DF	Kerstin Stegemann	29 September 1977 (aged 26)	113	3	(German Football Association) FFC Heike Rheine
3	MF	Kerstin Garefrekes	4 September 1979 (aged 24)	31	10	(German Football Association) 1. FFC Frankfurt
4	DF	Steffi Jones	22 December 1972 (aged 31)	78	5	(German Football Association) 1. FFC Frankfurt
5	DF	Sarah Günther	25 January 1983 (aged 21)	7	0	(German Football Association) Hamburger SV
6	MF	Viola Odebrecht	11 February 1983 (aged 21)	15	1	(German Football Association) 1. FFC Turbine Potsdam
7	MF	Pia Wunderlich	26 January 1975 (aged 29)	88	19	(German Football Association) 1. FFC Frankfurt
8	FW	Petra Wimbersky	9 November 1982 (aged 21)	25	3	(German Football Association) 1. FFC Turbine Potsdam
9	FW	Birgit Prinz (captain)	25 October 1977 (aged 26)	116	72	(German Football Association) 1. FFC Frankfurt
10	MF	Renate Lingor	11 October 1975 (aged 28)	78	15	(German Football Association) 1. FFC Frankfurt
11	FW	Martina Müller	18 April 1980 (aged 24)	37	20	(German Football Association) SC 07 Bad Neuenahr
12	MF	Navina Omilade	3 November 1981 (aged 22)	27	0	(German Football Association) 1. FFC Turbine Potsdam
13	DF	Sandra Minnert	7 April 1973 (aged 31)	109	13	(German Football Association) SC 07 Bad Neuenahr
14	FW	Isabell Bachor	10 July 1983 (aged 21)	7	1	(German Football Association) SC 07 Bad Neuenahr
15	DF	Sonja Fuss	5 November 1978 (aged 25)	25	1	(German Football Association) FSV Frankfurt
16	FW	Conny Pohlers	16 November 1978 (aged 25)	17	12	(German Football Association) 1. FFC Turbine Potsdam
17	DF	Ariane Hingst	25 July 1979 (aged 25)	91	9	(German Football Association) 1. FFC Turbine Potsdam
18	GK	Nadine Angerer	10 November 1978 (aged 25)	30	0	(German Football Association) 1. FFC Turbine Potsdam

Unenrolled alternate players
No.	Pos.	Player	Date of birth (age)	Caps	Goals	Club
19	MF	Britta Carlson	3 March 1978 (aged 26)			(German Football Association) 1. FFC Turbine Potsdam
20	FW	Sandra Smisek	3 July 1977 (aged 27)	90	21	(German Football Association) FSV Frankfurt
21	FW	Anja Mittag	16 May 1985 (aged 19)			(German Football Association) 1. FFC Turbine Potsdam
22	GK	Alexandra Schwald	18 May 1976 (aged 28)			(German Football Association) SC Freiburg

=== Mexico ===
Head coach: Leonardo Cuéllar

Mexico named a squad of 18 players and 3 alternates for the tournament.

No.	Pos.	Player	Date of birth (age)	Caps	Goals	Club
1	GK	Jennifer Molina	27 June 1981 (aged 23)			(United States Soccer Federation) Colgate University
2	DF	Elizabeth Gómez	21 September 1981 (aged 22)			(United States Soccer Federation) University of Miami
3	DF	Marlene Sandoval	18 January 1984 (aged 20)			(United States Soccer Federation) California State University
4	DF	Mónica González (captain)	10 October 1978 (aged 25)			(United States Soccer Federation) Boston Breakers
5	DF	María de Jesús Castillo	6 July 1983 (aged 21)			(Mexican Football Federation) Palomas
6	MF	Mónica Vergara	2 May 1983 (aged 21)			(Mexican Football Federation) Andreas Soccer
7	MF	Evelyn López	25 December 1978 (aged 25)			(Mexican Football Federation) Necaxa
8	MF	Fátima Leyva	14 February 1980 (aged 24)			(Mexican Football Federation) Santos Laguna
9	FW	Maribel Domínguez	18 November 1978 (aged 25)			(United States Soccer Federation) Atlanta Beat
10	FW	Iris Mora	22 September 1981 (aged 22)			(United States Soccer Federation) UC Los Angeles
11	MF	Patricia Pérez	17 December 1978 (aged 25)			(Mexican Football Federation) Chivas Tijuana
12	DF	Carina Maravillas	22 June 1983 (aged 21)			(Mexican Football Federation) Palomas
13	MF	Luz Saucedo	14 December 1983 (aged 20)			Unattached
14	DF	Nancy Gutiérrez	2 June 1987 (aged 17)			(United States Soccer Federation) Arsenal Soccer
15	MF	Dioselina Valderrama	28 April 1984 (aged 20)			(Mexican Football Federation) Bonita Rebel
16	FW	Alma Martínez	22 September 1981 (aged 22)			(United States Soccer Federation) UC Santa Barbara
17	FW	Lupita Worbis	12 December 1983 (aged 20)			(Mexican Football Federation) Rogers Soccer
18	GK	Pamela Tajonar	3 December 1984 (aged 19)			Unattached

Unenrolled alternate players
No.	Pos.	Player	Date of birth (age)	Caps	Goals	Club
20	FW	Mónica Ocampo	4 January 1987 (aged 17)			(Mexican Football Federation) Caudillas Morelos
21	FW	Leslie Muñoz	3 December 1985 (aged 18)			Unattached
22	GK	Alba García	11 September 1981 (aged 22)			(United States Soccer Federation) Cal State Dominguez Hills Toros

== Group G ==
=== Australia ===
Head coach: Adrian Santrac

Australia named a squad of 18 players and 3 alternates for the tournament.

No.	Pos.	Player	Date of birth (age)	Caps	Goals	Club
1	GK	Cassandra Kell	20 January 1980 (aged 24)	19	0	(Football Australia) New South Wales Sapphires
2	DF	Rhian Davies	5 January 1981 (aged 23)	33	2	(Football Australia) Canberra Eclipse
3	DF	Sacha Wainwright	6 February 1972 (aged 32)	61	2	(Football Australia) Canberra Eclipse
4	DF	Dianne Alagich	12 May 1979 (aged 25)	50	3	(Football Australia) Adelaide Sensation
5	DF	Cheryl Salisbury (captain)	8 March 1974 (aged 30)	18	4	(United States Soccer Federation) New York Power
6	MF	Sally Shipard	20 October 1987 (aged 16)	1	0	(Football Australia) New South Wales Sapphires
7	FW	Sarah Walsh	11 January 1983 (aged 21)	7	4	(Football Australia) Queensland Sting
8	MF	Heather Garriock	21 December 1982 (aged 21)	49	8	(Football Australia) Queensland Sting
9	MF	Kylie Ledbrook	20 March 1986 (aged 18)	4	0	(Football Australia) New South Wales Sapphires
10	MF	Joanne Peters	11 March 1979 (aged 25)	64	15	(United States Soccer Federation) New York Power
11	FW	Lisa De Vanna	14 November 1984 (aged 19)	6	3	(Football Australia) Adelaide Sensation
12	DF	Karla Reuter	14 June 1984 (aged 20)	13	0	(Football Australia) Queensland Sting
13	DF	Thea Slatyer	2 February 1983 (aged 21)	15	1	(Football Australia) New South Wales Sapphires
14	MF	Gillian Foster	28 August 1976 (aged 27)	32	1	(Football Australia) Canberra Eclipse
15	MF	Tal Karp	30 December 1981 (aged 22)	27	2	(Football Australia) Canberra Eclipse
16	FW	Selin Kuralay	25 January 1985 (aged 19)	7	1	(Football Australia) Victoria Vision
17	MF	Danielle Small	7 February 1979 (aged 25)	28	6	(Football Australia) New South Wales Sapphires
18	GK	Melissa Barbieri	8 August 1980 (aged 24)	16	0	(Football Australia) Victoria Vision

Unenrolled alternate players
No.	Pos.	Player	Date of birth (age)	Caps	Goals	Club
19	DF	Amy Taylor	11 June 1979 (aged 25)	24	3	(Football Australia) Canberra Eclipse
20	MF	Leah Blayney	4 July 1986 (aged 18)	5	0	(Football Australia) New South Wales Sapphires
21	MF	Lana Harch	23 November 1984 (aged 19)	3	3	(Football Australia) Queensland Sting

=== Brazil ===
Head coach: René Simões

Brazil named a squad of 18 players and 1 alternate for the tournament. During the tournament, Dayane replaced Kelly due to injury.

No.	Pos.	Player	Date of birth (age)	Caps	Goals	Club
1	GK	Maravilha	10 April 1973 (aged 31)			(Brazilian Football Confederation) Grêmio
2	FW	Grazielle	28 March 1981 (aged 23)			(Brazilian Football Confederation) Botucatu FC
3	DF	Mônica	4 April 1978 (aged 26)	0	2	(Brazilian Football Confederation) Ferroviária
4	DF	Tânia	3 October 1974 (aged 29)	22	3	(Royal Spanish Football Federation) Rayo Vallecano
5	DF	Juliana (captain)	3 October 1981 (aged 22)	18	4	(Swedish Football Association) Kopparberg/Göteborg FC
6	DF	Renata Costa	8 July 1986 (aged 18)	3	1	(Brazilian Football Confederation) Santos FC
7	MF	Formiga	3 March 1978 (aged 26)	12	8	(Swedish Football Association) LdB FC Malmö
8	DF	Daniela	12 January 1984 (aged 20)	6	7	(Swedish Football Association) Kopparberg/Göteborg FC
9	FW	Pretinha	19 May 1975 (aged 29)			Unattached
10	FW	Marta	19 February 1986 (aged 18)	13	2	(Swedish Football Association) Umeå IK
11	DF	Rosana	7 July 1982 (aged 22)	5	1	(Brazilian Football Confederation) Internacional
12	FW	Cristiane	15 May 1985 (aged 19)	4	8	(Brazilian Football Confederation) Juventus
13	DF	Aline	6 July 1982 (aged 22)			(Brazilian Football Confederation) UniSant'anna
14	MF	Elaine	1 November 1982 (aged 21)	2	4	(Brazilian Football Confederation) Ferroviária
15	MF	Maycon	30 April 1977 (aged 27)	8	2	(Brazilian Football Confederation) Grêmio
16	FW	Kelly	8 May 1985 (aged 19)			
17	FW	Roseli	7 September 1969 (aged 34)	12	8	Unattached
18	GK	Andréia	14 September 1977 (aged 26)	15	0	(Royal Spanish Football Federation) Puebla de la Calzada
21	FW	Dayane	13 May 1985 (aged 19)			(Brazilian Football Confederation) Novo Mundo

=== Greece ===
Head coach: Xanthi Konstantinidou

Greece named a squad of 18 players and 4 alternates for the tournament.

No.	Pos.	Player	Date of birth (age)	Caps	Goals	Club
1	GK	Maria Yatrakis	10 June 1980 (aged 24)	29	0	(United States Soccer Federation) Connecticut Huskies
2	MF	Angeliki Lagoumtzi	23 November 1982 (aged 21)	56	3	(Hellenic Football Federation) Kavala 86
3	MF	Sophia Smith	18 November 1978 (aged 25)	31	0	(United States Soccer Federation) Houston Stars
4	DF	Catherine Stratakis	12 September 1978 (aged 25)	32	0	(Hellenic Football Federation) Ergotelis
5	DF	Athanasia Pouridou	22 January 1975 (aged 29)	63	0	(Hellenic Football Federation) Kavala 86
6	MF	Eftichia Michailidou (captain)	20 September 1977 (aged 26)	80	6	(Hellenic Football Federation) Kavala 86
7	FW	Vasiliki Soupiadou	6 April 1978 (aged 26)	54	5	(Hellenic Football Federation) Aegina
8	DF	Konstantina Katsaiti	17 May 1980 (aged 24)	59	8	(Hellenic Football Federation) Aegina
9	FW	Angeliki Tefani	8 June 1982 (aged 22)	52	9	(Hellenic Football Federation) Ifestos Peristeriou
10	MF	Natalia Chatzigiannidou	19 June 1979 (aged 25)	77	8	(Hellenic Football Federation) MEAO Filiriakos
11	FW	Dimitra Panteliadou	15 February 1986 (aged 18)	39	13	(Hellenic Football Federation) PAOK
12	MF	Walker Loseno	12 January 1982 (aged 22)	23	3	(United States Soccer Federation) Gonzaga Bulldogs
13	DF	Alexandra Kavadas	31 August 1983 (aged 20)	12	0	(United States Soccer Federation) Greater Boston
14	FW	Anastasia Papadopoulou	1 July 1986 (aged 18)	34	4	(Hellenic Football Federation) Kavala 86
15	MF	Tanya Kalivas	26 August 1979 (aged 24)	34	3	(United States Soccer Federation) California Storm
16	DF	Eleni Benson	12 January 1983 (aged 21)	25	0	(United States Soccer Federation) Yale Bulldogs
17	MF	Maria Lazarou	30 September 1972 (aged 31)	110	26	(Hellenic Football Federation) PAOK
18	GK	Ileana Moschos	14 November 1976 (aged 27)	17	0	(United States Soccer Federation) California Storm

Unenrolled alternate players
No.	Pos.	Player	Date of birth (age)	Caps	Goals	Club
19	DF	Sofia Fostiropoulou	26 December 1974 (aged 29)	0	0	(Hellenic Football Federation) Filiriakos Florina
20	MF	Dimitra Theochari	4 January 1976 (aged 28)	9	2	(Royal Dutch Football Association) Heerenveen
21	MF	Maria Adamaki	11 January 1985 (aged 19)	0	0	(Hellenic Football Federation) Ergotelis
22	GK	Irene Papathanasiou	7 March 1981 (aged 23)	21	0	(Royal Dutch Football Association) SteDoCo

=== United States ===
Head coach: April Heinrichs

The United States named a squad of 18 players and 4 alternates for the tournament.

No.	Pos.	Player	Date of birth (age)	Caps	Goals	Club
1	GK	Briana Scurry	7 September 1971 (aged 32)	120	0	(United States Soccer Federation) Atlanta Beat
2	DF	Heather Mitts	9 June 1978 (aged 26)	4	0	(United States Soccer Federation) Philadelphia Charge
3	DF	Christie Rampone	24 June 1975 (aged 29)	102	4	(United States Soccer Federation) New York Power
4	DF	Cat Reddick	10 February 1982 (aged 22)	36	1	(United States Soccer Federation) University of North Carolina
5	MF	Lindsay Tarpley	22 September 1983 (aged 20)	7	0	(United States Soccer Federation) University of North Carolina
6	DF	Brandi Chastain	21 July 1968 (aged 36)	171	30	(United States Soccer Federation) San Jose CyberRays
7	MF	Shannon Boxx	29 June 1977 (aged 27)	2	2	(United States Soccer Federation) New York Power
8	MF	Angela Hucles	5 July 1978 (aged 26)	24	1	(United States Soccer Federation) San Diego Spirit
9	FW	Mia Hamm	17 March 1972 (aged 32)	239	142	(United States Soccer Federation) Washington Freedom
10	MF	Aly Wagner	10 August 1980 (aged 24)	47	12	(United States Soccer Federation) Boston Breakers
11	MF	Julie Foudy (captain)	23 January 1971 (aged 33)	231	41	(United States Soccer Federation) San Jose CyberRays
12	FW	Cindy Parlow	8 May 1978 (aged 26)	128	62	(United States Soccer Federation) Atlanta Beat
13	MF	Kristine Lilly	22 July 1971 (aged 33)	255	91	(United States Soccer Federation) Boston Breakers
14	DF	Joy Fawcett	8 February 1968 (aged 36)	216	26	(United States Soccer Federation) San Diego Spirit
15	DF	Kate Markgraf	23 August 1976 (aged 27)	97	0	(United States Soccer Federation) Boston Breakers
16	FW	Abby Wambach	2 June 1980 (aged 24)	14	9	(United States Soccer Federation) Washington Freedom
17	FW	Heather O'Reilly	2 January 1985 (aged 19)	18	3	(United States Soccer Federation) University of North Carolina
18	GK	Kristin Luckenbill	28 May 1979 (aged 25)	0	0	(United States Soccer Federation) Carolina Courage

Unenrolled alternate players
No.	Pos.	Player	Date of birth (age)	Caps	Goals	Club
19	FW	Shannon MacMillan	7 October 1974 (aged 29)	155	58	
20	MF	Lorrie Fair	5 August 1978 (aged 26)	114	7	
21	DF	Tiffany Roberts	5 May 1977 (aged 27)	101	7	
22	GK	Hope Solo	30 July 1981 (aged 23)	0	0	(Swedish Football Association) Kopparbergs/Landvetter IF
