= Greece women's national football team results (2000–2009) =

- Win Draw Loss

This is a list of the Greece women's national football team results and scheduled fixtures from 2000 to 2009.

== Results ==
Legend

Win Draw Lose Fixture

=== 2000 ===
4 March 2000 UEFA Women's Euro 2001 qualifying	Greece	4–0	Bosnia and Herzegovina	Halkida, Greece
15:00 EET	Lazarou 9'; Christoudi 48'; Tefani 65'; Moustaka 87'	UEFA		Stadium: Halkida Municipal Stadium

8 April 2000 UEFA Women's Euro 2001 qualifying	Hungary	6–0	Greece	Kecskemét, Hungary
17:00 EEST	Dombai-Nagy 47', 62', 68', 85'; Föfai 60'; Bökk 90'	UEFA		Stadium: Széktói Stadion

13 May 2000 UEFA Women's Euro 2001 qualifying	Turkey	2–3	Greece	Ankara, Turkey
16:00 EEST	Gündüz 19', 62'	UEFA	Giannakopoulou 29', 31', 46'	Stadium: Ankara 19 Mayıs Stadium; Referee: Antje Witteweg (Germany)

=== 2001 ===
27 October 2001 2003 FIFA Women's World Cup qualification	Serbia	6–1	Greece	Smederevo, Serbia
15:00 EEST	Stanojević 14', 35'; Stojanović 45'; Jovanović 50', 71', 86'	UEFA	Mainou 57'	Stadium: Smederevo Stadium

17 November 2001 2003 FIFA Women's World Cup qualification	Republic of Ireland	5–0	Greece	Dublin, Ireland
21:30 EET	Scanlan 25'; O'Toole 54', 73'; Thorpe 56'; Kierans 86'	UEFA		Stadium: Dalymount Park; Referee: Caroline De Boeck (Belgium)

28 November 2001 2003 FIFA Women's World Cup qualification	Greece	1–2	Moldova	Karditsa, Greece
15:00 EET	Lagoumtzi 23'	UEFA	Slonova 9'; Grajdean 13'	Stadium: Municipal Stadium of Karditsa

=== 2002 ===
24 March 2002 2003 FIFA Women's World Cup qualification	Greece	1–3	Republic of Ireland	Rethymno, Greece
15:30 EET	Lazarou 89' (pen.)	UEFA	Hughes 16'; O'Toole 46', 65'	Stadium: Rethymno Gallos Municipal Stadium; Referee: Regina Belksma-Konink (Netherlands)

20 April 2002 2003 FIFA Women's World Cup qualification	Greece	1–3	Serbia	Polykastro, Greece
16:00 EEST	Apostolidou 82' (pen.)	UEFA	Stojiljkovic 3'; Stanojević 30'; Todorovic 49'	Stadium: Polykastro Municipal Stadium

18 May 2002 2003 FIFA Women's World Cup qualification	Moldova	0–3	Greece	Chișinău, Moldova
17:00 EEST		UEFA	Katsaiti 9'; Mainou 39', 77'	Stadium: Dacia Stadium

=== 2003 ===
14 March 2003 2003 Algarve Cup	Republic of Ireland	0–0	Greece	Lagoa, Portugal
		HFF

16 March 2003 2003 Algarve Cup	Portugal	1–1	Greece	Guia, Portugal
	Couto 88'	HFF	Holan 37'

18 March 2003 2003 Algarve Cup	Greece	2–0	Wales	Quarteira, Portugal
	Tzanetakou 7'; Holan 80'	HFF

20 March 2003 2003 Algarve Cup	Canada	7–1	Greece	Guia, Portugal
	Sinclair 5', 38', 82'; Neil 26'; Lang 41'; Burtini 65'; Moscato 80'	HFF	Loseno 86'

25 October 2003 UEFA Women's Euro 2005 qualifying	Greece	7–0	Armenia	Livadeia, Greece
15:00 EEST	Panteliadou 11', 19'; Katsaiti 39', 87'; Soupiadou 48', 53'; Lazarou 67'	UEFA; HFF		Stadium: Levadia Municipal Stadium

28 October 2003 UEFA Women's Euro 2005 qualifying	Armenia	0–9	Greece	Thebes, Greece
15:00 EET		UEFA; HFF	Arvanitaki 5', 75'; Panteliadou 8', 10', 13', 15'; Soupiadou 47'; Katsaiti 53', 80' (pen.)	Stadium: Thebes Municipal Stadium

15 November 2003 UEFA Women's Euro 2005 qualifying	Greece	3–1	Slovakia	Drama, Greece
15:00 EET	Michailidou 8'; Lagoumtzi 16'; Kalivas 23'	UEFA; HFF	Felingova 73'	Stadium: Doxa Dramas Stadium

29 November 2003 UEFA Women's Euro 2005 qualifying	Greece	0–2	Austria	Naousa, Greece
15:00 EET		UEFA; HFF	Aigner 7'; Spieler 43'	Stadium: Municipal Stadium of Naoussa

=== 2004 ===
14 March 2004 2004 Algarve Cup	Greece	1–0	Wales	Faro, Portugal
15:45 EET	Papadopoulou 19'	HFF

16 March 2004 2004 Algarve Cup	Northern Ireland	0–2	Greece	Albufeira, Portugal
15:45 EET		HFF	Agapitou 41'; Tefaki 74'

18 March 2004 2004 Algarve Cup	Portugal	3–0	Greece	Faro, Portugal
18:15 EET	Pinto 8', 20', 55'	HFF

20 March 2004 2004 Algarve Cup	Greece	2–0	Northern Ireland	Montechoro, Portugal
	Agapitou 2', 90+'	HFF

24 April 2004 UEFA Women's Euro 2005 qualifying	Austria	1–2	Greece	Ottensheim, Austria
17:00 EEST	Fischer 89'	UEFA; HFF	Chatzigiannidou 38'; Michailidou 56'	Stadium: Donaustadion

29 April 2004 UEFA Women's Euro 2005 qualifying	Slovakia	2–2	Greece	Senec, Slovakia
16:30 EEST	Králiková 44'; Izova 84'	UEFA; HFF	Chatzigiannidou 6'; Kalivas 40'	Stadium: NTC Senec

11 August 2004 2004 Summer Olympics	Greece	0–3	United States	Heraklion, Greece
18:00 EEST		FIFA; HFF	Boxx 14'; Wambach 30'; Hamm 82'	Stadium: Pankritio Stadium; Attendance: 15,757; Referee: Jenny Palmqvist (Sweden)

14 August 2004 2004 Summer Olympics	Greece	0–1	Australia	Heraklion, Greece
18:00 EEST		FIFA; HFF	Garriock 27'	Stadium: Pankritio Stadium; Attendance: 8,857; Referee: D'Coth (India)

17 August 2004 2004 Summer Olympics	Greece	0–7	Brazil	Heraklion, Greece
18:00 EEST		FIFA; HFF	Pretinha 21'; Cristane 46', 55', 77'; Grazielle 49'; Marta 70'; Daniela 72'	Stadium: Pankritio Stadium; Attendance: 7,214; Referee: Christine Frai (Germany)

=== 2005 ===
29 October 2005 2007 FIFA Women's World Cup qualification	Greece	0–2	Serbia	Drama, Greece
15:30 EEST		UEFA; HFF	Podovac 85', 91'	Stadium: Doxa Dramas Stadium; Referee: Cristina Dorcioman (Romania)

9 November 2005 2007 FIFA Women's World Cup qualification	Greece	1–3	Ukraine	Kavala, Greece
15:30 EET	Papadopoulou 64'	UEFA; HFF	Kornievets 13', 37'; Frishko 83'	Stadium: Anthi Karagianni Stadium; Referee: Tanja Schett (Austria)

=== 2006 ===
25 March 2006 2007 FIFA Women's World Cup qualification	Greece	0–3	Norway	Athens, Greece
15:00 EET		UEFA; HFF	Gulbrandsen 2', 90+2'; Lehn 81'	Stadium: Georgios Kamaras Stadium; Referee: Christine Frai (Germany)

29 March 2006 2007 FIFA Women's World Cup qualification	Italy	2–0	Greece	Aversa, Italy
16:00 EEST	Zorri 38'; Greco 69'	UEFA; HFF		Stadium: Augusto Bisceglia Stadium; Referee: Milanova Djaleva (Bulgaria)

15 April 2006 2007 FIFA Women's World Cup qualification	Serbia	3–1	Greece	Lajkovac, Serbia
16:30 EEST	Jovanović 13'; Stojanović 68', 79'	UEFA; HFF	Arvanitaki 26'	Stadium: Stadion Lajkovac; Referee: Hilda McDermott (Ireland)

22 April 2006 2007 FIFA Women's World Cup qualification	Greece	0–5	Italy	Athens, Greece
12:00 EEST		UEFA; HFF	Panico 15' (pen.), 83', 86', 89'; Di Filippo 37'	Stadium: Kaisariani Municipal Stadium; Referee: Palemo Quintero Siles (Spain)

20 June 2006 2007 FIFA Women's World Cup qualification	Norway	4–0	Greece	Halden, Norway
19:00 EEST	Gulbrandsen 14', 45'; Knutsen 59'; Giske 85'	UEFA; HFF		Stadium: Halden Stadion; Referee: Martina Blahova (Czech Republic)

23 June 2006 2007 FIFA Women's World Cup qualification	Ukraine	6–0	Greece	Mariupol, Ukraine
19:00 EEST	Frishko 17', 42' (pen.); Verezubova 49', 58'; Sukhorukova 51'; Pekur 86'	UEFA; HFF		Stadium: Volodymyr Boyko Stadium; Referee: Knarik Grigoryan (Armenia)

=== 2007 ===
28 February 2007 Friendly	Greece	3–0	Romania	Athens, Greece
16:00 EET	Papadopoulou 25'; Panteliadou 38'; Chatzigiannidou 60'	HFF		Stadium: EAKN Agios Kosmas

2 March 2007 Friendly	Greece	1–0	Romania	Elefsina, Greece
17:00 EET	Arvanitaki 65'	HFF		Stadium: Municipal Stadium of Elefsina

11 April 2007 UEFA Women's Euro 2009 qualifying	France	6–0	Greece	Valence, France
20:00 EEST	Abily 25', 40', 81'; Soubeyrand 32'; Necib 41'; Lattaf 88'	UEFA; HFF		Stadium: Stade Georges Pompidou; Referee: Emilia Wnuk (Poland)

31 May 2007 UEFA Women's Euro 2009 qualifying	Greece	0–3	Iceland	Athens, Greece
18:00 EEST		UEFA; HFF	Viðarsdóttir 9' (pen.); Helgadóttir 14'; Samúelsdóttir 89'	Stadium: Kaisariani Municipal Stadium; Referee: Rhona Daly (Ireland)

25 August 2007 UEFA Women's Euro 2009 qualifying	Serbia	1–2	Greece	Belgrade, Serbia
18:00 EEST	Dimitrijević 71'	UEFA; HFF	Panteliadou 23'; Tsoukala 73'	Stadium: Stadion Kralj Petar I Referee: Nadezhda Ulyanovskaya (Russia)

=== 2008 ===
23 April 2008 UEFA Women's Euro 2009 qualifying	Greece	0–5	France	Athens, Greece
16:30 EEST		UEFA; HFF	Soubeyrand 39'; Herbert 49'; Bompastor 70'; Franco 85'; Thomis 90'	Stadium: Yiannis Pathiakakis Stadium; Referee: Sandra Braz (Portugal)

28 May 2008 UEFA Women's Euro 2009 qualifying	Slovenia	3–1	Greece	Dravograd, Slovenia
18:30 EEST	Benak 36'; Zver 38'; Petrović 90+1'	UEFA; HFF	Arvanitaki 31'	Stadium: Dravograd Sports Centre; Referee: Paula Thörn (Sweden)

26 June 2008 UEFA Women's Euro 2009 qualifying	Iceland	7–0	Greece	Reykjavík, Iceland
18:30 EEST	Gunnarsdóttir 4'; Magnúsdóttir 13', 53', 56'; Viðarsdóttir 30', 68'; Ómarsdóttir 66'	UEFA; HFF		Stadium: Laugardalsvöllur; Referee: Anja Kunick (Germany)

27 September 2008 UEFA Women's Euro 2009 qualifying	Greece	0–5	Serbia	Athens, Greece
16:00 EEST		UEFA; HFF	Dimitrijević 5', 24'; Sretenović 11', 76'; Malimić 83'	Stadium: Yiannis Pathiakakis Stadium; Referee: Silvia Tea Spinelli (Italy)

2 October 2008 UEFA Women's Euro 2009 qualifying	Greece	4–6	Slovenia	Athens, Greece
16:00 EEST	Arvanitaki 26', 88'; Papadopoulou 63'; Panteliadou 76'	UEFA; HFF	Zver 14', 83', 85'; Milković 19', 47'; Maleševič 78'	Stadium: Yiannis Pathiakakis Stadium; Referee: Kirsi Heikkinen (Finland)

=== 2009 ===
23 September 2009 2011 FIFA Women's World Cup qualification	Greece	0–6	Denmark	Athens, Greece
16:30 EEST		UEFA; HFF	Paaske Sørensen 12', 71'; Veje 17'; Pape 23'; Sand Andersen 25'; Rydahl 59'	Stadium: Yiannis Pathiakakis Stadium; Referee: Gordana Kuzmanović (Serbia)

21 October 2009 2011 FIFA Women's World Cup qualification	Bulgaria	0–1	Greece	Lovech, Bulgaria
15:30 EEST		UEFA; HFF	Panteliadou 53'	Stadium: Gradski Lovech Stadion; Referee: Caroline De Boeck (Belgium)

24 October 2009 2011 FIFA Women's World Cup qualification	Greece	0–1	Scotland	Athens, Greece
16:00 EEST		UEFA; HFF	Beattie 53'	Stadium: Yiannis Pathiakakis Stadium; Referee: Tanja Schett (Austria)

26 November 2009 2011 FIFA Women's World Cup qualification	Greece	5–0	Georgia	Athens, Greece
16:00 EEST	Katsaiti 31' (pen.); Kontomichi 42', 67', 70'; Papadopoulou 53'	UEFA; HFF		Stadium: Kaisariani Municipal Stadium; Referee: Hilda McDermott (Ireland)

== Record by opponent ==
Positive Record Neutral Record Negative Record

Opponents	Pld	W	D	L	GF	GA	GD
Armenia	2	2	0	0	16	0	+16
Australia	1	0	0	1	0	1	-1
Austria	2	1	0	1	2	3	-1
Bosnia and Herzegovina	1	1	0	0	4	0	+4
Brazil	1	0	0	1	0	7	-7
Bulgaria	1	1	0	0	1	0	+1
Canada	1	0	0	1	1	7	-6
Denmark	1	0	0	1	0	6	-6
France	2	0	0	2	0	11	-11
Georgia	1	1	0	0	5	0	+5
Hungary	1	0	0	1	0	6	-6
Iceland	2	0	0	2	0	10	-10
Italy	2	0	0	2	0	7	-7
Moldova	2	1	0	1	4	2	+2
Northern Ireland	1	2	0	0	4	0	+4
Norway	1	0	0	1	0	7	-7
Portugal	2	0	1	1	1	4	-3
Republic of Ireland	3	0	1	2	1	8	-7
Romania	2	2	0	0	4	0	+4
Scotland	1	0	0	1	0	1	-1
Serbia	6	1	0	5	5	20	-15
Slovakia	2	1	1	0	5	3	+2
Slovenia	2	0	0	2	5	9	-4
Turkey	1	1	0	0	3	2	+1
Ukraine	2	0	0	2	1	9	-8
United States	1	0	0	1	0	3	-3
Wales	2	2	0	0	3	0	+3
Total (46)	46	16	3	28	65	126	-61

== Stats ==
=== Most appearances ===
#	Player	Caps
1	Natalia Chatzigiannidou	43
2	Eftichia Michailidou	36
3	Dimitra Panteliadou	34
4	Anastasia Papadopoulou	33
5	Konstantina Katsaiti	30
6	Maria Adamaki	25
7	Anthoula Arvanitaki	22
8	Angeliki Lagoumtzi	18
8	Maria Lazarou	18
9	Athanasia Pouridou	17
9	Kyriaki Kynossidou	17
9	Eleni Kakambouki	17
10	Angeliki Tefani	16
10	Magdalina Tsoukala	16

=== Top goalscorers ===
#	Player	Goals	Caps
1	Dimitra Panteliadou	10	34
2	Anthoula Arvanitaki	7	22
3	Konstantina Katsaiti	6	30
4	Anastasia Papadopoulou	5	33
5	Natalia Chatzigiannidou	3	43
5	Maria Lazarou	3	18
5	Vasiliki Soupiadou	3	15
5	Kalomoira Kontomichi	3	15
5	Filothei Mainou	3	6
5	Giannakopoulou	3	4
5	Regina Agapitou	3	3
