= List of women's footballers with 100 or more international caps =

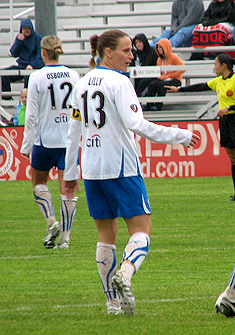
Kristine Lilly of the United States is the all-time highest international capped player with 354 caps.

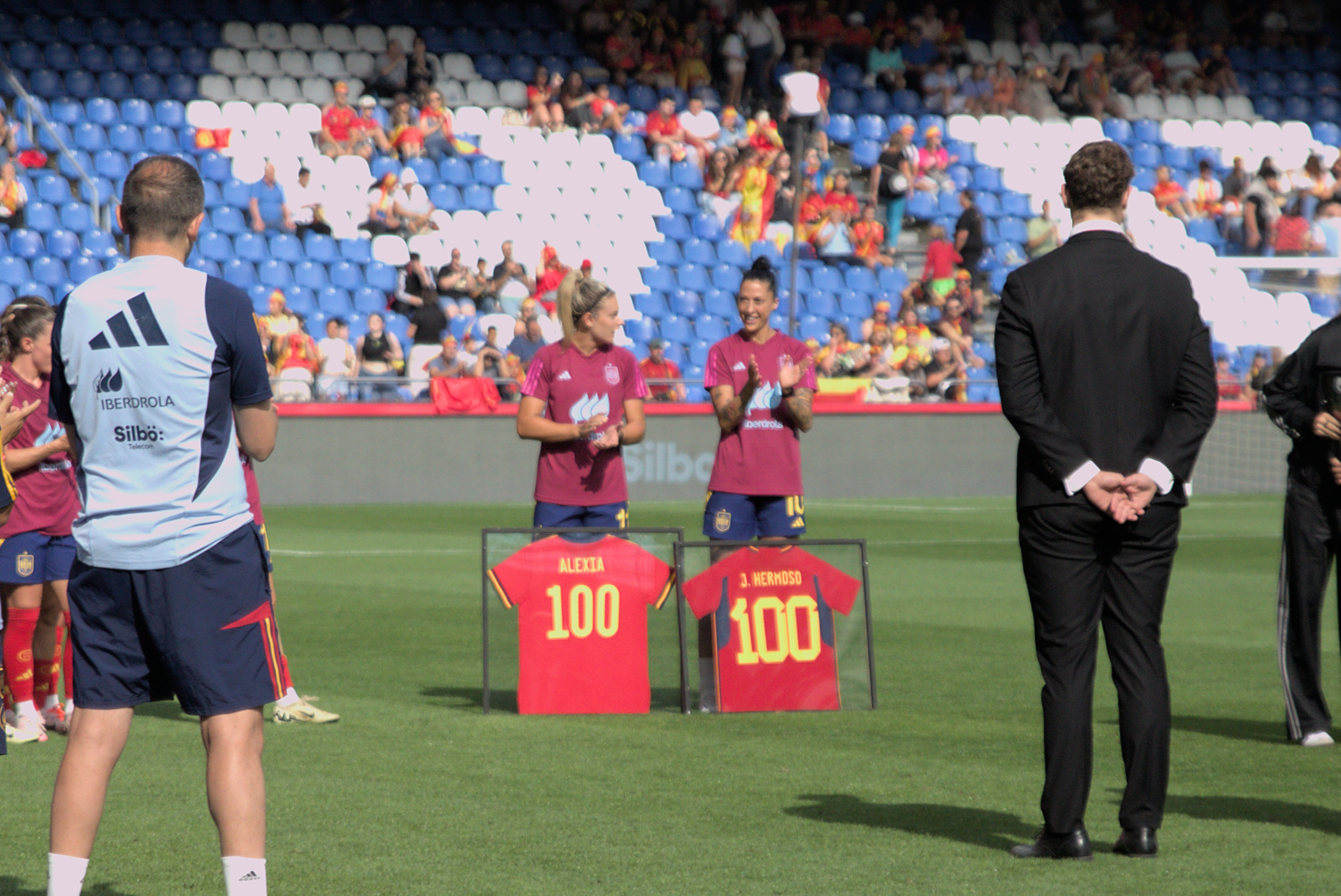
Spain players Alexia Putellas and Jenni Hermoso receiving commemorative shirts for making over 100 appearances

This list summarizes women association football players with 100 or more international appearances.

As of 13 October 2026, a total of 557 women have played 100 or more international matches for their respective nations. The all-time leader in senior caps, Kristine Lilly of the United States, has 354 caps and retired from international football on 6 January 2011.

The currently active most-capped woman international football player is Kosovare Asllani of the Sweden, with 209 caps.

Three American players, Kristine Lilly, Carli Lloyd and Christie Pearce, and one player from Canada, Christine Sinclair, have 300 or more caps. In total, 30 players — fourteen of them American; three from Canada and Sweden; two from Brazil; and one each from Denmark, France, Germany, Italy, Japan, the Netherlands, Romania, and Scotland — have 200 or more caps.

== FIFA criteria ==
FIFA recognises only matches played within the FIFA World Cup (including qualifying competitions), continental competitions (including qualifiers), friendly matches between senior national teams and Olympic final and qualifying matches as international "A" matches.

As FIFA recognises the Great Britain women's Olympic football team, these appearances are included. FIFA does not recognise the Catalonia women's national football team, and so these appearances are not included.

== Caps ==
The names of currently active players are in bold.

As of 13 October 2026.

indicates the most-capped player of all FIFA's confederations
indicates the most-capped player of the respective confederation
indicates the most-capped player of the respective nation

Rank	Player	Nation	Confederation	Caps	First cap	Last cap	Ref.
1	Kristine Lilly	United States	CONCACAF	354	3 August 1987	5 November 2010	
2	Christine Sinclair	Canada	CONCACAF	331	12 March 2000	5 December 2023	
3	Carli Lloyd	United States	CONCACAF	316	10 July 2005	26 October 2021	
4	Christie Pearce	United States	CONCACAF	311	28 February 1997	20 September 2015	
5	Mia Hamm	United States	CONCACAF	276	3 August 1987	8 December 2004	
6	Julie Foudy	United States	CONCACAF	274	29 July 1988	8 December 2004	
7	Abby Wambach	United States	CONCACAF	255	9 September 2001	16 December 2015	
8	Sherida Spitse	Netherlands	UEFA	248	31 August 2006	28 October 2025	
9	Joy Fawcett	United States	CONCACAF	241	3 August 1987	26 August 2004	
10	Caroline Seger	Sweden	UEFA	240	9 March 2005	31 October 2023	
11	Heather O'Reilly	United States	CONCACAF	231	1 March 2002	15 September 2016	
12	Sophie Schmidt	Canada	CONCACAF	226	19 April 2005	5 December 2023	
13	Alex Morgan	United States	CONCACAF	224	31 March 2010	4 June 2024	
14	Becky Sauerbrunn	United States	CONCACAF	219	16 January 2008	26 February 2024	
15	Formiga	Brazil	CONMEBOL	217	16 April 1995	25 November 2021	
16	Birgit Prinz	Germany	UEFA	214	27 July 1994	30 June 2011	
16	Therese Sjögran	Sweden	UEFA	214	30 October 1997	20 June 2015	
18	Katrine Pedersen	Denmark	UEFA	210	14 September 1994	25 July 2013	
19	**Kosovare Asllani**	Sweden	UEFA	209	27 September 2008	7 March 2026	
20	Tiffeny Milbrett	United States	CONCACAF	206	4 August 1991	23 October 2005	
20	Diana Matheson	Canada	CONCACAF	206	18 March 2003	10 March 2020	
22	Homare Sawa	Japan	AFC	205	6 December 1993	5 July 2015	
23	Patrizia Panico	Italy	UEFA	204	8 April 1996	27 November 2014	
24	Gemma Fay	Scotland	UEFA	203	24 May 1998	27 July 2017	
24	Megan Rapinoe	United States	CONCACAF	203	23 July 2006	24 September 2023	
26	Hope Solo	United States	CONCACAF	202	5 April 2000	12 August 2016	
27	Kate Markgraf	United States	CONCACAF	201	26 April 1998	17 July 2010	
27	Florentina Olar	Romania	UEFA	201	30 September 2001	3 June 2025	
27	**Marta**	Brazil	CONMEBOL	201	23 April 2003	9 June 2026	
30	**Eugénie Le Sommer**	France	UEFA	200	12 February 2009	4 April 2025	
31	Sandrine Soubeyrand	France	UEFA	198	12 April 1997	22 July 2013	
32	Sanne Troelsgaard Nielsen	Denmark	UEFA	197	10 March 2008	8 July 2025	
33	Shannon Boxx	United States	CONCACAF	195	1 September 2003	21 October 2015	
34	Brandi Chastain	United States	CONCACAF	192	1 June 1988	8 December 2004	
34	Élise Bussaglia	France	UEFA	192	15 November 2003	28 June 2019	
34	**Carole Costa**	Portugal	UEFA	192	30 January 2008	13 October 2026	
37	Kerstin Stegemann	Germany	UEFA	191	13 April 1995	30 August 2009	
38	Joanne Love	Scotland	UEFA	189	1 March 2002	8 April 2019	
38	Hedvig Lindahl	Sweden	UEFA	189	25 January 2002	26 July 2022	
40	Hege Riise	Norway	UEFA	188	23 July 1990	27 May 2004	
40	Laura Georges	France	UEFA	188	26 September 2001	7 March 2018	
40	Nilla Fischer	Sweden	UEFA	188	12 January 2001	30 November 2021	
40	Desiree Scott	Canada	CONCACAF	188	24 February 2010	31 May 2025	
44	**Ana Borges**	Portugal	UEFA	187	4 March 2009	7 July 2025	
45	Lotta Schelin	Sweden	UEFA	185	16 March 2004	29 July 2017	
45	Janine van Wyk	South Africa	CAF	185	7 August 2005	4 December 2023	
45	**Dolores Silva**	Portugal	UEFA	185	4 March 2009	13 October 2026	
48	Solveig Gulbrandsen	Norway	UEFA	183	17 June 1998	22 June 2015	
48	Camille Abily	France	UEFA	183	26 September 2001	30 July 2017	
48	Maren Mjelde	Norway	UEFA	183	27 October 2007	16 July 2025	
48	**Ana-Maria Crnogorčević**	Switzerland	UEFA	183	12 August 2009	9 October 2026	
52	**Ji So-yun**	South Korea	AFC	182	30 October 2006	2 October 2026	
52	**Zhang Rui**	China	AFC	182	28 April 2008	2 October 2026	
54	Rhian Wilkinson	Canada	CONCACAF	181	26 April 2003	4 February 2017	
54	Tobin Heath	United States	CONCACAF	181	18 January 2008	26 October 2021	
56	**Lindsey Heaps**	United States	CONCACAF	180	8 March 2013	13 October 2026	
57	**Janice Cayman**	Belgium	UEFA	178	28 October 2007	13 October 2026	
58	Shannon MacMillan	United States	CONCACAF	177	7 July 1993	23 October 2005	
58	Fara Williams	England; Great Britain	UEFA	177	24 November 2001	3 September 2019	
60	**Daniëlle van de Donk**	Netherlands	UEFA	176	15 December 2010	13 October 2026	
61	Briana Scurry	United States	CONCACAF	175	16 March 1994	5 November 2008	
61	**Emily van Egmond**	Australia	AFC	175	6 March 2010	9 October 2026	
61	**Pernille Harder**	Denmark	UEFA	175	24 October 2009	12 October 2026	
64	Ariane Hingst	Germany	UEFA	174	27 August 1996	5 July 2011	
64	Noko Matlou	South Africa	CAF	174	28 July 2007	5 April 2025	
66	**Saki Kumagai**	Japan	AFC	173	7 March 2008	9 June 2026	
67	Bente Nordby	Norway	UEFA	172	30 August 1991	27 October 2007	
68	**Katrine Veje**	Denmark	UEFA	171	22 July 2009	12 July 2025	
69	Carla Overbeck	United States	CONCACAF	170	5 June 1988	17 December 2000	
69	Pu Wei	China	AFC	170	7 March 1999	27 November 2013	
69	Jill Scott	England; Great Britain	UEFA	170	31 August 2006	31 July 2022	
72	Clare Polkinghorne	Australia	AFC	169	19 June 2006	7 December 2024	
73	**Wendie Renard**	France	UEFA	168	2 March 2011	25 February 2025	
73	**Sarah Puntigam**	Austria	UEFA	168	4 March 2009	13 October 2026	
75	Han Duan	China	AFC	167	11 January 2001	11 September 2011	
75	**Sofia Jakobsson**	Sweden	UEFA	167	17 May 2011	17 July 2025	
77	Victoria Svensson	Sweden	UEFA	166	9 October 1996	4 September 2009	
77	Ria Percival	New Zealand	OFC	166	14 November 2006	30 July 2023	
77	Jess Fishlock	Wales	UEFA	166	15 March 2006	25 October 2025	
80	Gaëtane Thiney	France	UEFA	163	28 February 2007	9 November 2019	
80	**Wang Shanshan**	China	AFC	163	26 July 2011	6 December 2023	
80	Ali Riley	New Zealand	OFC	163	4 February 2007	13 July 2024	
83	Trine Rønning	Norway	UEFA	162	23 October 1999	9 March 2016	
83	Aya Miyama	Japan	AFC	162	19 March 2003	9 March 2016	
85	Natalia Chatzigiannidou	Greece	UEFA	161	2 November 1997	27 November 2020	
86	Waraporn Boonsing	Thailand	AFC	160	2009	18 February 2023	
86	Kelley O'Hara	United States	CONCACAF	160	28 March 2010	6 August 2023	
86	Lieke Martens	Netherlands	UEFA	160	22 August 2011	4 June 2024	
86	Crystal Dunn	United States	CONCACAF	160	13 February 2013	31 May 2025	
86	Betsy Hassett	New Zealand	OFC	160	16 June 2008	28 November 2025	
86	Linda Sembrant	Sweden	UEFA	160	12 February 2008	2 December 2025	
86	**Tessa Wullaert**	Belgium	UEFA	160	20 August 2011	13 October 2026	
93	**Kadeisha Buchanan**	Canada	CONCACAF	159	12 January 2013	12 October 2026	
93	**Jessie Fleming**	Canada	CONCACAF	159	15 December 2013	12 October 2026	
95	Cindy Parlow Cone	United States	CONCACAF	158	14 January 1996	8 December 2004	
95	Bi Yan	China	AFC	158	27 August 2002	16 December 2012	
95	Anja Mittag	Germany	UEFA	158	31 March 2004	30 July 2017	
95	**Cristiane**	Brazil	CONMEBOL	158	3 August 2001	4 June 2024	
95	**Sophie Ingle**	Wales; Great Britain	UEFA	158	28 October 2009	13 October 2026	
100	Kristin Bengtsson	Sweden	UEFA	157	26 February 1991	1 November 2005	
100	Linda Sällström	Finland	UEFA	157	31 May 2007	28 October 2025	
100	**Daryna Apanashchenko**	Ukraine	UEFA	157	12 May 2002	14 April 2026	
103	Daniela Pufulete	Romania	UEFA	156	18 September 1993	31 October 2007	
103	Annemieke Griffioen	Netherlands	UEFA	156	9 December 1995	18 May 2011	
103	Sonia Bompastor	France	UEFA	156	26 February 2000	9 August 2012	
103	**Cho So-hyun**	South Korea	AFC	156	1 July 2007	4 June 2024	
103	**Tamires**	Brazil	CONMEBOL	156	22 September 2013	4 March 2026	
103	**Wu Haiyan**	China	AFC	156	20 November 2012	2 October 2026	
109	Michelle Akers	United States	CONCACAF	155	21 August 1985	20 August 2000	
109	Tatiana Zorri	Italy	UEFA	155	29 October 1994	27 October 2010	
109	Christen Press	United States	CONCACAF	155	9 February 2013	5 August 2021	
109	**Sunisa Srangthaisong**	Thailand	AFC	155	2006	4 February 2022	
109	Rachel Corsie	Scotland	UEFA	155	5 March 2009	30 May 2025	
109	**Refiloe Jane**	South Africa	CAF	155	4 March 2012	13 August 2026	
115	Bettina Wiegmann	Germany	UEFA	154	1 October 1989	12 October 2003	
115	**Ashley Lawrence**	Canada	CONCACAF	154	12 January 2013	12 October 2026	
117	Carolina Morace	Italy	UEFA	153	1 November 1978	12 July 1997	
117	Li Jie	China	AFC	153	10 March 1997	15 August 2008	
117	Johanna Rasmussen	Denmark	UEFA	153	17 October 2002	30 August 2018	
117	**Ramona Bachmann**	Switzerland	UEFA	153	15 June 2007	8 April 2025	
121	Linda Medalen	Norway	UEFA	152	7 October 1987	23 October 1999	
121	**Kim Jung-mi**	South Korea	AFC	152	10 June 2003	4 June 2024	
121	**Lucy Bronze**	England; Great Britain	UEFA	152	26 June 2013	5 June 2026	
121	**Alanna Kennedy**	Australia	AFC	152	24 June 2012	9 June 2026	
121	**Caitlin Foord**	Australia	AFC	152	12 May 2011	13 October 2026	
126	Heidi Støre	Norway	UEFA	151	10 July 1980	6 July 1997	
126	Malin Andersson	Sweden	UEFA	151	4 May 1994	24 September 2005	
126	Cheryl Salisbury	Australia	OFC/AFC	151	20 April 1994	31 January 2009	
126	Jane Ross	Scotland	UEFA	151	10 March 2009	4 June 2024	
130	Lisa De Vanna	Australia	OFC/AFC	150	18 February 2004	18 June 2019	
130	Nompumelelo Nyandeni	South Africa	CAF	150	21 September 2002	8 April 2025	
130	**Glódís Perla Viggósdóttir**	Iceland	UEFA	150	4 August 2012	13 October 2026	
130	**Alexia Putellas**	Spain	UEFA	150	28 June 2013	13 October 2026	
134	Renate Lingor	Germany	UEFA	149	25 October 1995	21 August 2008	
134	Karen Carney	England; Great Britain	UEFA	149	17 February 2005	6 July 2019	
134	Sarah Bouhaddi	France	UEFA	149	21 February 2004	4 March 2020	
134	Kim Little	Scotland; Great Britain	UEFA	149	14 February 2007	30 July 2021	
134	**Steph Catley**	Australia	AFC	149	24 June 2012	9 October 2026	
139	**Debinha**	Brazil	CONMEBOL	148	18 October 2011	4 June 2024	
139	**Kim Hye-ri**	South Korea	AFC	148	16 November 2010	2 October 2026	
141	Sandra Minnert	Germany	UEFA	147	28 May 1992	1 November 2007	
141	Anna Westerlund	Finland	UEFA	147	16 January 2008	6 September 2022	
141	Ioana Bortan	Romania	UEFA	147	27 March 2010	3 June 2025	
141	**Ayah Al-Majali**	Jordan	AFC	147	3 November 2006	13 October 2026	
141	**Angharad James-Turner**	Wales	UEFA	147	27 October 2011	13 October 2026	
146	Pia Sundhage	Sweden	UEFA	146	15 June 1975	25 July 1996	
146	Dyanne Bito	Netherlands	UEFA	146	14 October 2000	20 May 2015	
146	Nadine Angerer	Germany	UEFA	146	27 August 1996	4 July 2015	
146	Abby Erceg	New Zealand	OFC	146	14 November 2006	23 February 2022	
146	Fanny Vágó	Hungary	UEFA	146	14 March 2007	22 February 2023	
146	**Katherine Alvarado**	Costa Rica	CONCACAF	146	28 April 2010	9 June 2026	
152	Carla Couto	Portugal	UEFA	145	11 November 1993	5 April 2012	
152	Louisa Cadamuro	France	UEFA	145	19 February 2005	13 August 2016	
152	Alex Scott	England; Great Britain	UEFA	145	18 September 2004	27 July 2017	
152	Sara Björk Gunnarsdóttir	Iceland	UEFA	145	26 August 2007	11 October 2022	
152	Alexandra Popp	Germany	UEFA	145	17 February 2010	28 October 2024	
157	Doris Fitschen	Germany	UEFA	144	4 October 1986	7 July 2001	
157	Svetlana Petko	Russia; Soviet Union	UEFA	144	15 April 1990	26 May 2005	
157	Ingvild Stensland	Norway	UEFA	144	23 January 2003	7 June 2016	
157	Annalie Longo	New Zealand	OFC	144	14 November 2006	2 December 2025	
157	**Maysa Jbarah**	Jordan	AFC	144	23 September 2005	13 October 2026	
157	**Noelle Maritz**	Switzerland	UEFA	144	6 March 2013	13 October 2026	
163	Jen Beattie	Scotland	UEFA	143	5 March 2008	11 October 2022	
163	**Sam Kerr**	Australia	AFC	143	7 February 2009	13 October 2026	
165	**Lia Wälti**	Switzerland	UEFA	142	21 August 2011	13 October 2026	
166	Marleen Wissink	Netherlands	UEFA	141	11 April 1989	2 November 2006	
166	Élodie Thomis	France	UEFA	141	6 June 2005	30 July 2017	
166	**Wang Shuang**	China	AFC	141	12 January 2013	2 October 2026	
169	Laura Rus	Romania	UEFA	140	2 February 2005	5 December 2023	
169	Sara Gama	Italy	UEFA	140	17 June 2006	23 February 2024	
171	Daphne Koster	Netherlands	UEFA	139	27 August 1997	23 November 2013	
171	Shinobu Ohno	Japan	AFC	139	12 January 2003	7 March 2016	
171	**Henrietta Csiszár**	Hungary	UEFA	139	29 February 2012	13 October 2026	
171	**Tatiana Pinto**	Portugal	UEFA	139	10 March 2014	13 October 2026	
175	Ingrid Hjelmseth	Norway	UEFA	138	23 January 2003	3 September 2019	
175	**Dominique Janssen**	Netherlands	UEFA	138	5 March 2014	13 October 2026	
177	Heather Mitts	United States	CONCACAF	137	24 February 1999	15 December 2012	
177	Annike Krahn	Germany	UEFA	137	28 January 2005	19 August 2016	
177	Nothando Vilakazi	South Africa	CAF	137	10 August 2008	9 September 2022	
177	**Jana Vojteková**	Slovakia	UEFA	137	27 March 2010	9 June 2026	
177	**Jéssica Silva**	Portugal	UEFA	137	19 November 2011	13 October 2026	
182	Merete Pedersen	Denmark	UEFA	136	11 March 1993	11 March 2009	
182	Tatiana Skotnikova	Russia	UEFA	136	24 June 2001	12 July 2013	
182	Manon Melis	Netherlands	UEFA	136	25 April 2004	9 March 2016	
182	Leanne Ross	Scotland	UEFA	136	26 April 2006	27 July 2017	
182	Cláudia Neto	Portugal	UEFA	136	9 March 2006	13 April 2021	
182	**Tameka Yallop**	Australia	AFC	136	4 August 2007	2 December 2025	
182	**Patrícia Hmírová**	Slovakia	UEFA	136	27 May 2012	13 October 2026	
189	Casey Stoney	England; Great Britain	UEFA	135	16 August 2000	1 July 2017	
189	Lara Dickenmann	Switzerland	UEFA	135	14 August 2002	9 October 2018	
189	**Dominika Škorvánková**	Slovakia	UEFA	135	28 October 2009	9 June 2026	
189	**Diana Bartovičová**	Slovakia	UEFA	135	2 March 2011	13 October 2026	
193	Tisha Venturini	United States	CONCACAF	134	14 August 1992	16 March 2000	
193	Unni Lehn	Norway	UEFA	134	31 August 1996	14 July 2007	
193	Cat Whitehill	United States	CONCACAF	134	7 July 2000	31 March 2010	
193	Rachel Yankey	England; Great Britain	UEFA	134	23 August 1997	15 July 2013	
193	Emma Byrne	Republic of Ireland	UEFA	134	6 September 1997	8 June 2017	
193	Lisa Dahlkvist	Sweden	UEFA	134	12 February 2008	29 July 2017	
193	Mária Korenčiová	Slovakia	UEFA	134	23 November 2006	9 June 2026	
193	**Cristiana Girelli**	Italy	UEFA	134	6 March 2013	13 October 2026	
201	Sandra Smisek	Germany	UEFA	133	13 April 1995	1 October 2008	
201	Katrín Jónsdóttir	Iceland	UEFA	133	9 May 1994	26 September 2013	
201	Alessia Tuttino	Italy	UEFA	133	13 February 2002	27 November 2014	
201	Lauren Holiday	United States	CONCACAF	133	26 January 2007	25 October 2015	
201	Isabell Herlovsen	Norway	UEFA	133	11 March 2005	8 October 2019	
201	Theresa Eslund	Denmark	UEFA	133	5 March 2008	7 March 2020	
201	**Jackie Groenen**	Netherlands	UEFA	133	22 January 2016	5 June 2026	
201	**Bia Zaneratto**	Brazil	CONMEBOL	133	14 May 2011	13 October 2026	
201	**Denise O'Sullivan**	Republic of Ireland	UEFA	133	17 September 2011	13 October 2026	
210	Andrea Neil	Canada	CONCACAF	132	19 April 1991	15 September 2007	
210	Pauline Hamill	Scotland	UEFA	132	17 April 1992	25 August 2010	
210	Brittany Baxter	Canada	CONCACAF	132	9 April 2002	26 November 2014	
210	Sara Thunebro	Sweden	UEFA	132	30 January 2004	17 June 2015	
210	Yūki Nagasato	Japan	AFC	132	22 April 2004	21 July 2016	
210	Edite Fernandes	Portugal	UEFA	132	21 December 1997	16 September 2016	
210	Line Røddik Hansen	Denmark	UEFA	132	25 February 2006	19 September 2017	
210	Amy Rodriguez	United States	CONCACAF	132	11 March 2005	4 September 2018	
210	**Catalina Usme**	Colombia	CONMEBOL	132	12 November 2006	2 August 2025	
210	**Adriana Leon**	Canada	CONCACAF	132	12 January 2013	2 December 2025	
210	**Vivianne Miedema**	Netherlands	UEFA	132	26 September 2013	7 March 2026	
210	Ștefania Vătafu	Romania	UEFA	132	7 September 2009	18 April 2026	
210	**Pitsamai Sornsai**	Thailand	AFC	132	2005	21 September 2026	
210	**Verena Hanshaw**	Austria	UEFA	132	27 April 2011	9 October 2026	
210	**Janine Sonis**	Canada	CONCACAF	132	26 November 2014	12 October 2026	
210	**Klára Cahynová**	Czech Republic	UEFA	132	3 June 2011	13 October 2026	
210	**Stina Blackstenius**	Sweden	UEFA	132	27 October 2015	13 October 2026	
227	Aly Wagner	United States	CONCACAF	131	16 December 1998	8 November 2008	
227	Hallbera Guðný Gísladóttir	Iceland	UEFA	131	5 March 2008	18 July 2022	
227	Nguyễn Thị Tuyết Dung	Vietnam	AFC	131	20 October 2011	9 August 2025	
227	**Maria Ficzay**	Romania	UEFA	131	7 September 2009	13 October 2026	
231	Zhao Lihong	China	AFC	130	12 July 1993	3 October 2003	
231	Hanna Ljungberg	Sweden	UEFA	130	2 June 1996	20 July 2008	
231	Laura Kalmari	Finland	UEFA	130	11 March 1996	7 March 2011	
231	Kerstin Garefrekes	Germany	UEFA	130	17 November 2001	9 July 2011	
231	Heather Garriock	Australia	OFC/AFC	130	28 October 1999	11 September 2011	
231	Elise Thorsnes	Norway	UEFA	130	10 May 2006	23 February 2022	
231	**Julie Nelson**	Northern Ireland	UEFA	130	14 March 2004	15 November 2022	
231	**Sarah Zadrazil**	Austria	UEFA	130	25 August 2010	13 October 2026	
239	Charmaine Hooper	Canada	CONCACAF	129	7 July 1986	30 July 2006	
239	Martina Moser	Switzerland	UEFA	129	20 August 2005	26 July 2017	
239	Steph Houghton	England; Great Britain	UEFA	129	8 March 2007	30 July 2021	
239	**Mateja Zver**	Slovenia	UEFA	129	10 March 2007	13 October 2026	
239	**Irene Paredes**	Spain	UEFA	129	20 November 2011	13 October 2026	
244	Megan Sneddon	Scotland	UEFA	128	8 September 2002	17 September 2014	
244	Tinja-Riikka Korpela	Finland	UEFA	128	7 March 2007	8 April 2025	
244	Davina Philtjens	Belgium	UEFA	128	17 February 2008	11 July 2025	
247	Caroline Abbé	Switzerland	UEFA	127	25 February 2006	18 July 2017	
247	Olivia Oprea	Romania	UEFA	127	2 February 2005	22 February 2023	
247	Carina Wenninger	Austria	UEFA	127	5 May 2007	7 April 2023	
247	**Raquel Rodríguez**	Costa Rica	CONCACAF	127	20 October 2007	9 June 2026	
247	**Caroline Graham Hansen**	Norway	UEFA	127	26 October 2011	9 June 2026	
247	**Kadidiatou Diani**	France	UEFA	127	22 November 2014	10 October 2026	
247	**Lineth Beerensteyn**	Netherlands	UEFA	127	4 June 2016	13 October 2026	
254	Sun Wen	China	AFC	126	29 May 1991	15 March 2006	
254	Silke Rottenberg	Germany	UEFA	126	7 April 1993	29 May 2008	
254	Karolina Westberg	Sweden	UEFA	126	21 May 1997	20 July 2008	
254	Kozue Ando	Japan	AFC	126	26 June 1999	8 June 2015	
254	Anita Pádár	Hungary	UEFA	126	3 April 1995	3 August 2015	
254	Ifeoma Dieke	Scotland; Great Britain	UEFA	126	15 January 2004	27 July 2017	
254	Gu Yasha	China	AFC	126	26 April 2008	6 October 2023	
254	Laura Feiersinger	Austria	UEFA	126	9 June 2010	28 October 2025	
254	**Elena Linari**	Italy	UEFA	126	31 October 2013	7 March 2026	
254	**Caroline Weir**	Scotland; Great Britain	UEFA	126	1 June 2013	9 October 2026	
254	**Virginia Kirchberger**	Austria	UEFA	126	9 June 2010	13 October 2026	
254	**Carolina Arias**	Colombia	CONMEBOL	126	18 September 2010	13 October 2026	
266	Martina Voss	Germany	UEFA	125	3 October 1984	16 March 2000	
266	Gillian Coultard	England	UEFA	125	3 May 1981	13 May 2000	
266	Lindsay Tarpley	United States	CONCACAF	125	12 January 2003	14 May 2011	
266	Melissa Tancredi	Canada	CONCACAF	125	26 February 2004	4 February 2017	
266	Amber Hearn	New Zealand	OFC	125	18 February 2004	9 June 2018	
266	Loes Geurts	Netherlands	UEFA	125	20 August 2005	7 March 2020	
266	Lucie Martínková	Czech Republic	UEFA	125	8 June 2003	22 February 2023	
266	Hannah Wilkinson	New Zealand	OFC	125	17 February 2010	31 May 2024	
266	**Jennifer Hermoso**	Spain	UEFA	125	21 June 2012	2 December 2025	
266	**Diana Silva**	Portugal	UEFA	125	7 March 2014	18 April 2026	
266	**Yanara Aedo**	Chile	CONMEBOL	125	4 November 2010	5 June 2026	
266	**Lebogang Ramalepe**	South Africa	CAF	125	12 April 2014	13 August 2026	
278	Natalia Barbachina	Russia	UEFA	124	17 September 1995	17 November 2009	
278	Portia Modise	South Africa	CAF	124	14 November 2000	11 March 2015	
278	Angéla Smuczer	Hungary	UEFA	124	29 September 2001	14 September 2017	
278	Mizuho Sakaguchi	Japan	AFC	124	19 July 2006	20 April 2018	
278	Katie Duncan	New Zealand	OFC	124	14 November 2006	20 June 2019	
278	Margrét Lára Viðarsdóttir	Iceland	UEFA	124	14 June 2003	8 October 2019	
278	Sílvia Rebelo	Portugal	UEFA	124	27 September 2008	27 July 2023	
278	Petra Bertholdová	Czech Republic	UEFA	124	24 March 2002	3 December 2024	
278	**Carolina Mendes**	Portugal	UEFA	124	4 November 2006	30 May 2025	
278	**Huỳnh Như**	Vietnam	AFC	124	16 October 2011	10 March 2026	
278	**Rose Lavelle**	United States	CONCACAF	124	4 March 2017	13 October 2026	
289	Ri Kum-suk	North Korea	AFC	123	8 December 1998	12 August 2008	
289	Melanie Behringer	Germany	UEFA	123	28 January 2005	19 August 2016	
289	Marie-Laure Delie	France	UEFA	123	23 September 2009	27 November 2017	
289	Shahnaz Jebreen	Jordan	AFC	123	3 November 2006	15 November 2022	
289	Julie Ertz	United States	CONCACAF	123	9 February 2013	21 September 2023	
289	Magdalena Eriksson	Sweden	UEFA	123	8 February 2014	17 July 2025	
289	**Katrina Gorry**	Australia	AFC	123	11 July 2012	21 March 2026	
289	**Emma Koivisto**	Finland	UEFA	123	6 March 2012	13 October 2026	
297	Fan Yunjie	China	AFC	122	12 July 1993	14 August 2004	
297	Azusa Iwashimizu	Japan	AFC	122	18 February 2006	9 March 2016	
297	Louise Quinn	Republic of Ireland	UEFA	122	2 February 2008	3 June 2025	
297	**Dagný Brynjarsdóttir**	Iceland	UEFA	122	24 February 2010	10 July 2025	
297	**Barbara Bonansea**	Italy	UEFA	122	19 September 2012	13 October 2026	
302	Corinne Diacre	France	UEFA	121	9 March 1993	12 June 2005	
302	Cathrine Paaske Sørensen	Denmark	UEFA	121	14 March 2000	7 October 2010	
302	Kelly Smith	England; Great Britain	UEFA	121	1 November 1995	8 May 2014	
302	Melania Gabbiadini	Italy	UEFA	121	16 April 2003	25 July 2017	
302	Mamello Makhabane	South Africa	CAF	121	7 August 2005	12 February 2022	
302	Tuija Hyyrynen	Finland	UEFA	121	26 September 2007	8 July 2022	
302	Ellen White	England; Great Britain	UEFA	121	25 March 2010	31 July 2022	
302	**Stephany Mayor**	Mexico	CONCACAF	121	29 October 2010	18 April 2026	
302	**Jang Sel-gi**	South Korea	AFC	121	6 March 2013	2 October 2026	
302	**Shelina Zadorsky**	Canada	CONCACAF	121	14 January 2013	12 October 2026	
302	**Violeta Slović**	Serbia	UEFA	121	26 September 2009	13 October 2026	
313	Antonella Carta	Italy	UEFA	120	8 April 1984	24 June 1999	
313	Brit Sandaune	Norway	UEFA	120	20 March 1995	16 November 2003	
313	Irina Grigorieva	Russia; Soviet Union	UEFA	120	5 August 1990	28 May 2005	
313	Lorrie Fair	United States	CONCACAF	120	4 February 1996	24 July 2005	
313	Sanna Valkonen	Finland	UEFA	120	30 August 1995	26 August 2009	
318	Carin Jennings-Gabarra	United States	CONCACAF	119	5 July 1987	1 August 1996	
318	Hiromi Ikeda	Japan	AFC	119	8 June 1997	21 August 2008	
318	Stephanie Al-Naber	Jordan	AFC	119	23 September 2005	9 April 2019	
318	Erin McLeod	Canada	CONCACAF	119	3 March 2002	26 October 2021	
318	Áine O'Gorman	Republic of Ireland	UEFA	119	15 March 2006	26 July 2023	
318	**Pikul Khueanpet**	Thailand	AFC	119	2009	29 October 2024	
318	**Nichelle Prince**	Canada	CONCACAF	119	12 January 2013	9 October 2026	
325	Anne Eggers Nielsen	Denmark	UEFA	118	15 August 1993	28 November 2007	
325	Hanna Marklund	Sweden	UEFA	118	30 August 1997	28 November 2007	
325	Ho Sun-hui	North Korea	AFC	118	2003	12 August 2008	
325	Anne Mäkinen	Finland	UEFA	118	8 June 1991	3 September 2009	
325	Jessica Julin	Finland	UEFA	118	10 March 1997	3 September 2009	
325	Julie Fleeting	Scotland	UEFA	118	17 November 1996	8 February 2015	
325	Rosana	Brazil	CONMEBOL	118	23 June 2000	19 September 2017	
325	Đặng Thị Kiều Trinh	Vietnam	AFC	118	1 October 2004	13 April 2018	
325	Babett Peter	Germany	UEFA	118	9 March 2006	6 October 2018	
325	Dorianne Theuma	Malta	UEFA	118	10 August 2003	31 May 2024	
325	**Viktória Szabó**	Hungary	UEFA	118	17 April 2013	29 November 2025	
325	**Emily Sonnett**	United States	CONCACAF	118	25 October 2015	9 June 2026	
325	**Daniela Montoya**	Colombia	CONMEBOL	118	5 November 2010	13 October 2026	
338	Marina Burakova	Russia; Soviet Union	UEFA	117	1985	8 September 2003	
338	Duangnapa Sritala	Thailand	AFC	117	2008	20 June 2019	
338	**Patrícia Fischerová**	Slovakia	UEFA	117	31 March 2012	18 April 2026	
338	**Camila Sáez**	Chile	CONMEBOL	117	2 March 2011	5 June 2026	
338	**Jill Roord**	Netherlands	UEFA	117	7 February 2015	13 October 2026	
343	Stéphanie Mugneret-Béghé	France	UEFA	116	17 April 1992	12 June 2005	
343	Maribel Domínguez	Mexico	CONCACAF	116	29 August 1998	15 February 2016	
343	Kethy Õunpuu	Estonia	UEFA	116	27 June 2008	6 October 2022	
343	**Eleni Kakambouki**	Greece	UEFA	116	23 June 2006	3 June 2025	
343	**Katie Bowen**	New Zealand	OFC	116	12 May 2011	29 October 2025	
343	**Mariana Benavides**	Costa Rica	CONCACAF	116	1 September 2012	9 June 2026	
343	**Rachel Cuschieri**	Malta	UEFA	116	23 February 2007	9 October 2026	
350	Guadalupe Worbis	Mexico	CONCACAF	115	12 January 2002	3 September 2013	
350	Ashley Hutton	Northern Ireland	UEFA	115	9 March 2005	15 July 2022	
350	Elise Kellond-Knight	Australia	AFC	115	4 August 2007	19 February 2023	
350	Niamh Fahey	Republic of Ireland	UEFA	115	7 March 2007	3 December 2024	
350	**Lisa Evans**	Scotland	UEFA	115	27 October 2011	3 December 2024	
350	Alyssa Naeher	United States	CONCACAF	115	18 December 2014	3 December 2024	
350	**Melissa Herrera**	Costa Rica	CONCACAF	115	1 September 2012	10 April 2026	
350	**Hayley Ladd**	Wales	UEFA	115	15 June 2011	18 April 2026	
358	Tomoe Kato	Japan	AFC	114	8 June 1997	12 August 2008	
358	Candace Chapman	Canada	CONCACAF	114	1 March 2002	9 August 2012	
358	Dóra María Lárusdóttir	Iceland	UEFA	114	13 September 2003	1 March 2017	
358	Katrin Loo	Estonia	UEFA	114	26 May 2007	23 October 2020	
358	Aya Sameshima	Japan	AFC	114	10 March 2008	8 April 2021	
358	**Réka Szőcs**	Hungary	UEFA	114	21 October 2007	16 July 2024	
358	**Rebekah Stott**	New Zealand	OFC	114	17 June 2012	9 June 2026	
358	**Grace Geyoro**	France	UEFA	114	22 January 2017	10 October 2026	
358	**Guro Reiten**	Norway	UEFA	114	14 January 2014	13 October 2026	
358	**Ewelina Kamczyk**	Poland	UEFA	114	9 March 2014	13 October 2026	
368	Malin Moström	Sweden	UEFA	113	26 July 1998	24 September 2006	
368	Randee Hermus	Canada	CONCACAF	113	12 March 2000	9 August 2008	
368	Rachel Buehler	United States	CONCACAF	113	5 March 2008	9 March 2015	
368	Rumi Utsugi	Japan	AFC	113	21 May 2005	2 June 2019	
368	Liu Shanshan	China	AFC	113	13 December 2012	13 February 2020	
368	Zsófia Rácz	Hungary	UEFA	113	14 March 2007	23 October 2020	
368	Hólmfríður Magnúsdóttir	Iceland	UEFA	113	16 February 2003	27 October 2020	
368	Li Ying	China	AFC	113	9 December 2012	3 February 2022	
368	**Tine De Caigny**	Belgium	UEFA	113	8 February 2014	1 December 2025	
368	**Evelin Fenyvesi**	Hungary	UEFA	113	20 August 2013	13 October 2026	
368	**Alex Greenwood**	England	UEFA	113	5 March 2014	13 October 2026	
379	Elisabeth Leidinge	Sweden	UEFA	112	27 July 1974	13 June 1995	
379	Tiffany Roberts	United States	CONCACAF	112	16 March 1994	3 October 2004	
379	Marinette Pichon	France	UEFA	112	22 March 1994	30 September 2006	
379	Sara Larsson	Sweden	UEFA	112	8 September 2000	15 September 2012	
379	Nanna Christiansen	Denmark	UEFA	112	4 March 2009	21 October 2021	
379	Dzsenifer Marozsán	Germany	UEFA	112	28 October 2010	11 April 2023	
379	**Lou Jiahui**	China	AFC	112	28 April 2008	26 October 2023	
379	Jonna Andersson	Sweden	UEFA	112	26 January 2016	17 July 2025	
379	Jermaine Seoposenwe	South Africa	CAF	112	24 October 2010	25 July 2025	
379	Laura Deloose	Belgium	UEFA	112	23 May 2015	1 December 2025	
379	**Christiane Endler**	Chile	CONMEBOL	112	11 November 2009	5 June 2026	
379	**Anna Kozhnikova**	Russia	UEFA	112	27 September 2006	7 June 2026	
379	**Hayley Raso**	Australia	AFC	112	24 June 2012	13 October 2026	
379	**Ewa Pajor**	Poland	UEFA	112	20 August 2013	13 October 2026	
393	Silvia Neid	Germany	UEFA	111	10 November 1982	25 July 1996	
393	Lena Videkull	Sweden	UEFA	111	12 May 1984	31 August 1996	
393	Ann Kristin Aarønes	Norway	UEFA	111	2 September 1990	23 October 1999	
393	Liu Ailing	China	AFC	111	3 August 1987	16 December 2001	
393	Giorgia Brenzan	Italy	UEFA	111	1 March 1986	8 June 2002	
393	Maria Lazarou	Greece	UEFA	111	3 July 1991	14 August 2004	
393	Steffi Jones	Germany	UEFA	111	3 July 1993	14 March 2007	
393	Hoda Lattaf	France	UEFA	111	22 November 1997	16 June 2007	
393	Zhang Ouying	China	AFC	111	18 January 1998	23 September 2007	
393	Maria Makowska	Poland	UEFA	111	26 June 1988	19 May 2010	
393	Célia Šašić	Germany	UEFA	111	28 January 2005	4 July 2015	
393	Aline Zeler	Belgium	UEFA	111	31 August 2005	1 June 2019	
393	Rosie White	New Zealand	OFC	111	10 January 2009	26 October 2021	
393	Kyah Simon	Australia	AFC	111	4 August 2007	12 April 2022	
393	Sara Däbritz	Germany	UEFA	111	29 June 2013	23 July 2025	
393	**Laura Giuliani**	Italy	UEFA	111	5 March 2014	9 October 2026	
393	**Nicole Billa**	Austria	UEFA	111	26 October 2013	13 October 2026	
393	**Hali Long**	Philippines	AFC	111	26 July 2016	13 October 2026	
411	Gunn Nyborg	Norway	UEFA	110	7 July 1978	10 October 1992	
411	Joanne Peters	Australia	OFC/AFC	110	24 March 1996	7 February 2009	
411	Rhonda Jones	Scotland	UEFA	110	3 May 1998	7 April 2013	
411	Karina LeBlanc	Canada	CONCACAF	110	21 July 1998	13 January 2015	
411	Eniola Aluko	England; Great Britain	UEFA	110	18 September 2004	12 April 2016	
411	**Olivia Schough**	Sweden	UEFA	110	6 March 2013	23 February 2024	
411	**Lim Seon-joo**	South Korea	AFC	110	26 August 2009	30 May 2025	
411	**Manuela Zinsberger**	Austria	UEFA	110	2 June 2013	30 May 2025	
411	Fanndís Friðriksdóttir	Iceland	UEFA	110	9 March 2009	3 June 2025	
411	**Kristina Nevrkla**	Croatia	UEFA	110	27 June 2008	18 April 2026	
411	**Milica Mijatović**	Serbia	UEFA	110	21 November 2009	9 June 2026	
411	**Kaja Eržen**	Slovenia	UEFA	110	5 April 2012	9 June 2026	
411	**Fridolina Rolfö**	Sweden	UEFA	110	3 August 2014	9 June 2026	
411	**Aldana Cometti**	Argentina	CONMEBOL	110	8 March 2014	13 October 2026	
425	Elisabetta Vignotto	Italy	UEFA	109	19 September 1970	15 November 1989	
425	Jane Törnqvist	Sweden	UEFA	109	30 August 1995	18 July 2006	
425	Angela Hucles	United States	CONCACAF	109	27 April 2002	22 July 2009	
425	Lene Jensen	Denmark	UEFA	109	7 September 1996	1 April 2010	
425	Đoàn Thị Kim Chi	Vietnam	AFC	109	8 December 1998	23 May 2010	
425	Nina Burger	Austria	UEFA	109	1 September 2005	9 April 2019	
425	Agnieszka Winczo	Poland	UEFA	109	27 March 2004	27 October 2020	
425	Onome Ebi	Nigeria	CAF	109	20 September 2003	31 July 2023	
425	Gaëlle Thalmann	Switzerland	UEFA	109	17 June 2007	5 August 2023	
425	Kwon Hah-nul	South Korea	AFC	109	30 November 2006	28 September 2023	
425	Amandine Henry	France	UEFA	109	22 April 2009	31 July 2024	
425	Emmi Alanen	Finland	UEFA	109	19 June 2010	29 November 2024	
425	**Sarah McFadden**	Northern Ireland	UEFA	109	9 March 2005	7 March 2026	
425	**Stephania Farrugia**	Malta	UEFA	109	23 February 2007	7 March 2026	
425	**Nevena Damjanović**	Serbia	UEFA	109	21 August 2010	13 October 2026	
425	**Yui Hasegawa**	Japan	AFC	109	1 March 2017	13 October 2026	
441	Zhang Yanru	China	AFC	108	28 January 2005	11 September 2011	
441	Þóra Björg Helgadóttir	Iceland	UEFA	108	10 May 1998	17 September 2014	
441	Kristine Minde	Norway	UEFA	108	6 July 2011	22 September 2020	
441	Ali Krieger	United States	CONCACAF	108	16 January 2008	22 January 2021	
441	Lucia Ondrušová	Slovakia	UEFA	108	7 March 2006	22 February 2022	
441	Shirley Cruz	Costa Rica	CONCACAF	108	30 October 2002	21 February 2023	
441	Nadia Nadim	Denmark	UEFA	108	4 March 2009	12 July 2025	
441	**Bambanani Mbane**	South Africa	CAF	108	12 April 2016	13 August 2026	
441	**Katie McCabe**	Republic of Ireland	UEFA	108	4 March 2015	13 October 2026	
441	**Keira Walsh**	England; Great Britain	UEFA	108	28 November 2017	13 October 2026	
451	Ane Stangeland Horpestad	Norway	UEFA	107	12 May 1999	2 October 2008	
451	Mariann Gajhede Knudsen	Denmark	UEFA	107	5 October 2003	26 November 2015	
451	Kaire Palmaru	Estonia	UEFA	107	13 October 2001	7 November 2019	
451	Alexandra Bíróová	Slovakia	UEFA	107	28 October 2009	30 November 2021	
451	Signy Aarna	Estonia	UEFA	107	2 November 2007	7 April 2023	
451	Cristín Granados	Costa Rica	CONCACAF	107	3 April 2008	26 July 2023	
451	Stefanie van der Gragt	Netherlands	UEFA	107	8 March 2013	11 August 2023	
451	**Kenti Robles**	Mexico	CONCACAF	107	17 October 2010	13 October 2026	
459	Luz Saucedo	Mexico	CONCACAF	106	12 July 2003	24 January 2012	
459	Sylvia Smit	Netherlands	UEFA	106	6 August 2004	17 July 2013	
459	Lori Chalupny	United States	CONCACAF	106	7 March 2001	25 October 2015	
459	Lena Goeßling	Germany	UEFA	106	28 February 2008	12 June 2019	
459	**Andressa Alves**	Brazil	CONMEBOL	106	9 December 2012	2 August 2023	
459	**Hayley Lauder**	Scotland	UEFA	106	26 February 2010	27 February 2024	
459	**Quinn**	Canada	CONCACAF	106	7 March 2014	8 April 2025	
459	**Karen Araya**	Chile	CONMEBOL	106	10 November 2006	28 July 2025	
459	**Olga Ovdiychuk**	Ukraine	UEFA	106	15 September 2012	18 April 2026	
459	**Linda Motlhalo**	South Africa	CAF	106	25 March 2016	13 October 2026	
469	Gro Espeseth	Norway	UEFA	105	2 March 1991	28 September 2000	
469	Lene Terp	Denmark	UEFA	105	9 March 1993	25 May 2003	
469	Zhang Ying	China	AFC	105	30 January 2004	14 January 2010	
469	Anna-Kaisa Rantanen	Finland	UEFA	105	6 July 1996	27 October 2011	
469	Ciara Grant	Republic of Ireland	UEFA	105	28 October 1995	19 September 2012	
469	Amanda Dlamini	South Africa	CAF	105	28 July 2007	22 January 2017	
469	Loren Dykes	Wales	UEFA	105	26 August 2007	12 November 2019	
469	**Warunee Phetwiset**	Thailand	AFC	105	2014	18 February 2023	
469	Helen Ward	Wales	UEFA	105	30 September 2008	21 February 2023	
469	**Inna Kiss-Zlidnis**	Estonia	UEFA	105	2 November 2007	8 April 2025	
469	**Charlene Zammit**	Malta	UEFA	105	5 June 2009	3 June 2025	
469	**Mina Tanaka**	Japan	AFC	105	8 March 2013	6 June 2026	
469	**Ria Öling**	Finland	UEFA	105	12 February 2015	9 October 2026	
469	**Adelina Engman**	Finland	UEFA	105	27 May 2012	13 October 2026	
469	**Mallory Swanson**	United States	CONCACAF	105	23 January 2016	13 October 2026	
484	Heidi Mohr	Germany	UEFA	104	19 May 1986	29 September 1996	
484	Sarina Wiegman	Netherlands	UEFA	104	23 May 1987	14 June 2001	
484	Suzanne Grant	Scotland	UEFA	104	29 November 2000	7 April 2013	
484	Lyudmyla Pekur	Ukraine	UEFA	104	17 April 1997	7 June 2016	
484	Anastasia Papadopoulou	Greece	UEFA	104	3 April 2003	11 April 2017	
484	Kirsty Yallop	New Zealand	OFC	104	3 October 2004	19 September 2017	
484	Ren Guixin	China	AFC	104	28 May 2012	8 October 2018	
484	Julie Biesmans	Belgium	UEFA	104	17 September 2011	11 April 2023	
484	Lydia Williams	Australia	AFC	104	28 July 2005	3 June 2024	
484	**Daniela Cruz**	Costa Rica	CONCACAF	104	28 April 2010	10 April 2026	
484	**Patrícia Morais**	Portugal	UEFA	104	25 August 2011	5 June 2026	
484	**Mariona Caldentey**	Spain	UEFA	104	1 March 2017	9 June 2026	
484	**Phạm Hải Yến**	Vietnam	AFC	104	7 June 2011	25 September 2026	
484	**Manuela Giugliano**	Italy	UEFA	104	25 October 2014	9 October 2026	
484	**Martyna Wiankowska**	Poland	UEFA	104	11 February 2015	9 October 2026	
484	**Heidi Sevdal**	Faroe Islands	UEFA	104	18 November 2006	12 October 2026	
484	**Fátima Pinto**	Portugal	UEFA	104	26 October 2013	13 October 2026	
484	**Andreia Norton**	Portugal	UEFA	104	25 October 2016	13 October 2026	
484	**Frida Maanum**	Norway	UEFA	104	11 July 2017	13 October 2026	
503	Edda Garðarsdóttir	Iceland	UEFA	103	7 September 1997	1 June 2013	
503	Sanna Talonen	Finland	UEFA	103	16 March 2004	17 September 2014	
503	Anouk Hoogendijk	Netherlands	UEFA	103	6 August 2004	17 September 2015	
503	Simone Laudehr	Germany	UEFA	103	29 July 2007	24 October 2017	
503	Shorooq Shathli	Jordan	AFC	103	23 September 2005	9 April 2019	
503	Rakel Hönnudóttir	Iceland	UEFA	103	5 March 2008	1 December 2020	
503	Natasha Harding	Wales	UEFA	103	8 May 2008	6 September 2022	
503	Kristina Bannikova	Estonia	UEFA	103	20 March 2013	5 December 2023	
503	Emilie Haavi	Norway	UEFA	103	3 June 2010	9 April 2024	
503	**Lixy Rodríguez**	Costa Rica	CONCACAF	103	30 September 2011	9 April 2024	
503	**Anastasija Ročāne**	Latvia	UEFA	103	13 February 2011	24 October 2025	
503	**Izabela Lojna**	Croatia	UEFA	103	9 May 2010	14 April 2026	
503	**Sakina Karchaoui**	France	UEFA	103	11 April 2016	10 October 2026	
503	**Sanni Franssi**	Finland	UEFA	103	12 February 2015	13 October 2026	
517	Anissa Tann	Australia	OFC	102	1 June 1988	9 October 2002	
517	Pia Wunderlich	Germany	UEFA	102	7 December 1993	1 March 2006	
517	Amy Walsh	Canada	CONCACAF	102	19 July 1998	12 March 2009	
517	Paula Cristina	Portugal	UEFA	102	15 June 1995	25 August 2010	
517	Juana López	Mexico	CONCACAF	102	13 August 1994	27 June 2011	
517	Liu Huana	China	AFC	102	30 January 2004	22 August 2011	
517	Rachel Unitt	England	UEFA	102	16 August 2000	11 March 2013	
517	Jeon Ga-eul	South Korea	AFC	102	12 August 2007	6 April 2019	
517	**Wilaiporn Boothduang**	Thailand	AFC	102	2009	4 February 2022	
517	Gunnhildur Yrsa Jónsdóttir	Iceland	UEFA	102	26 October 2011	18 July 2023	
517	Diane Caldwell	Republic of Ireland	UEFA	102	15 March 2006	27 February 2024	
517	**Ashalata Devi**	India	AFC	102	18 March 2011	27 October 2024	
517	**Natalia Kuikka**	Finland	UEFA	102	1 June 2013	10 July 2025	
517	**Rafaelle**	Brazil	CONMEBOL	102	11 December 2011	9 June 2026	
517	**Kelly Rosen**	Estonia	UEFA	102	1 March 2014	9 June 2026	
517	**Ellie Carpenter**	Australia	AFC	102	2 March 2016	9 October 2026	
517	**Doris Bačić**	Croatia	UEFA	102	24 November 2011	13 October 2026	
517	**Ebru Topçu**	Turkey	UEFA	102	31 October 2013	13 October 2026	
517	**Mária Mikolajová**	Slovakia	UEFA	102	7 August 2015	13 October 2026	
536	Wang Liping	China	AFC	101	3 December 1993	14 August 2004	
536	Marta Otrębska	Poland	UEFA	101	26 June 1988	21 June 2007	
536	Martina Müller	Germany	UEFA	101	22 July 2000	29 November 2012	
536	Kaylyn Kyle	Canada	CONCACAF	101	16 January 2008	27 June 2015	
536	Ma Xiaoxu	China	AFC	101	25 November 2005	13 August 2016	
536	Saskia Bartusiak	Germany	UEFA	101	12 April 2007	19 August 2016	
536	Elvira Todua	Russia	UEFA	101	28 August 2005	30 November 2021	
536	**Lee Geum-min**	South Korea	AFC	101	6 March 2013	14 April 2026	
536	**Ada Hegerberg**	Norway	UEFA	101	19 November 2011	9 October 2026	
536	**Armisa Kuč**	Montenegro	UEFA	101	13 March 2012	13 October 2026	
546	Maura Furlotti	Italy	UEFA	100	1 November 1972	19 November 1991	
546	Petra Hogewoning	Netherlands	UEFA	100	6 August 2004	17 September 2015	
546	Katri Mattsson	Finland	UEFA	100	24 February 1999	27 October 2015	
546	Yukari Kinga	Japan	AFC	100	29 March 2005	9 March 2016	
546	Elena Morozova	Russia	UEFA	100	9 July 2005	12 June 2018	
546	Leandra Smeda	South Africa	CAF	100	26 February 2010	10 November 2019	
546	Sarah Gregorius	New Zealand	OFC	100	29 September 2010	4 March 2020	
546	**Eseosa Aigbogun**	Switzerland	UEFA	100	21 September 2013	2 December 2025	
546	**Simone Boye**	Denmark	UEFA	100	8 December 2011	12 October 2026	
546	Allysha Chapman	Canada	CONCACAF	100	25 October 2014	12 October 2026	
546	**Eva Bartoňová**	Czech Republic	UEFA	100	26 November 2010	13 October 2026	
546	**Ingrid Syrstad Engen**	Norway	UEFA	100	28 February 2018	13 October 2026	

== Most women with 100 or more caps by country ==
As of 13 October 2026.

Number	Nation	Confederation
45	United States	CONCACAF
28	Germany	UEFA
27	Sweden	UEFA
24	Canada	CONCACAF
24	Norway	UEFA
23	China	AFC
20	France	UEFA
19	Netherlands	UEFA
18	Australia	OFC through 2005; AFC 2006–present
17	Finland	UEFA
16	Denmark	UEFA
16	Scotland (including appearances for Great Britain)	UEFA
15	England (including appearances for Great Britain)	UEFA
15	Italy	UEFA
15	Japan	AFC
15	Portugal	UEFA
13	Iceland	UEFA
13	New Zealand	OFC
13	South Africa	CAF
9	Austria	UEFA
9	Brazil	CONMEBOL
9	Slovakia	UEFA
9	South Korea	AFC
9	Switzerland	UEFA
8	Costa Rica	CONCACAF
8	Hungary	UEFA
8	Republic of Ireland	UEFA
8	Russia and/or Soviet Union	UEFA
7	Belgium	UEFA
7	Estonia	UEFA
7	Romania	UEFA
7	Thailand	AFC
7	Wales (including appearances for Great Britain)	UEFA
6	Mexico	CONCACAF
6	Poland	UEFA
5	Jordan	AFC
5	Vietnam	AFC
4	Chile	CONMEBOL
4	Czech Republic	UEFA
4	Greece	UEFA
4	Malta	UEFA
4	Spain	UEFA
3	Colombia	CONMEBOL
3	Croatia	UEFA
3	Northern Ireland	UEFA
3	Serbia	UEFA
3	Ukraine	UEFA
2	North Korea	AFC
2	Slovenia	UEFA
1	Argentina	CONMEBOL
1	Faroe Islands	UEFA
1	India	AFC
1	Latvia	UEFA
1	Montenegro	UEFA
1	Nigeria	CAF
1	Philippines	AFC
1	Turkey	UEFA
557	57	FIFA

== Most women with 100 or more caps by confederation ==
As of 13 October 2026.

Footballers	Nations	Confederation
344	36	UEFA
85	10	AFC
83	4	CONCACAF
17	4	CONMEBOL
14	1	OFC
14	2	CAF
557	57	Total

== See also ==
- List of top international women's football goalscorers by country
- List of women's footballers with 100 or more international goals
- List of men's footballers with 50 or more international goals
- List of men's footballers with the most official appearances
- List of footballers with 500 or more goals
