= Ileana Moschos =

American-born Greek footballer

Personal information
- Date of birth: 14 November 1976 (age 49)
- Place of birth: Indianapolis, Indiana, U.S.
- Position: Goalkeeper

Youth career
- 1994–1997: Wofford Terriers

Senior career*
Years	Team	Apps	(Gls)
2004	California Storm		

International career
2004	Greece	17 (?)	(0)
- * Club domestic league appearances and goals

Ileana Moschos (Greek: Ιλεάνα Μόσχου; born 14 November 1976) is an American-born Greek former footballer wbho played as a goalkeeper.

Moschos was part of the Greece women's national football team at the 2004 Summer Olympics. On club level she played for California Storm in the United States.

== Early life ==
Moschos was born in Indianapolis, Indiana, United States.

== See also ==
- Greece at the 2004 Summer Olympics
