= Walker Loseno =

American-born Greek footballer

Amalia Loseno
Personal information
- Full name: Walker Amiel Loseno
- Date of birth: 12 January 1982 (age 44)
- Place of birth: New York City, New York, U.S.
- Height: 5 ft 5 in (1.65 m)
- Position: Midfielder

Youth career
- FC Royals Soccer Club
- Kentridge Chargers

College career
| Years | Team | Apps | (Gls) |
| 2001–2004 | Gonzaga Bulldogs | | |

International career
| 2004 | Greece | 23 (?) | (3) |

Walker Amiel Loseno (born 12 January 1982), known in Greece as Amalia Loseno (Greek: Αμαλία Λοσένο), is an American-born Greek retired footballer who played as a midfielder. She has been a member of the Greece women's national team.

== College career ==
Loseno has attended the Gonzaga University in Spokane, Washington.

== International career ==
Loseno began playing for the Greece in January 2003, after coming across a notice on a women's football website that the Greek national team was looking for players. She represented the country at the 2004 Summer Olympics.

== Personal life ==
Loseno was born to Susan Johnson (née Haldezos) and David Loseno, and is named after the photographer Walker Evans. Though born in the United States, Amalia was able to obtain Greek citizenship in 2004 through her great-grandparents on her mother's side, who emigrated to the United States from Plomari. She holds Greek citizenship under her baptismal name, Amalia.

== See also ==
- Greece at the 2004 Summer Olympics
