= Angeliki Tefani =

Greek footballer

Personal information
- Date of birth: 8 June 1982 (age 44)
- Place of birth: Greece
- Position: Forward

Senior career*
Years	Team	Apps	(Gls)
2004	Ifestos Peristeriou		

International career
2004	Greece	52	(9)
- * Club domestic league appearances and goals

Angeliki Tefani (born 8 June 1982) is a former Greek footballer who played as a forward. She played for Greece at the 2004 Summer Olympics. At club level she played for Ifestos Peristeriou.

== See also ==
- Greece at the 2004 Summer Olympics
