= Xanthi Konstantinidou =

Greek footballer and manager

Personal information
- Date of birth: 2 January 1962 (age 64)
- Place of birth: Agios Athanasios, Greece
- Position: Centre forward

Senior career*
Years	Team	Apps	(Gls)
1979–	Olympiad Thessaloniki		
–1983	Thessaloniki '80		

Managerial career
- 1985–1987: Profodou Nafpaktos (men)
- 1987–1989: Olympiad '96
- 1990–1999: Ilioupoli Thessaloniki
- 1991–1992: Centaur Larissa
- 1994–1995: Alexander (men)
- 2000–2002: Greece women (technical adviser)
- 2002–2004: Greece women
- * Club domestic league appearances and goals

Xanthi Konstantinidou (Greek: Ξανθή Κωνσταντινίδου; born 2 January 1962) is a Greek former footballer and manager.

== Career ==
Konstantinidou began her career as a footballer, playing as a centre forward for Olympiad Thessaloniki and Thessaloniki '80 from 1979 to 1983. In 1983, she became the first woman to receive an "A" coaching license in Greece. She began her coaching career with the Profodou Nafpaktos men's team from 1985 to 1987, before managing Olympiad '96 from 1987 to 1989. From 1990 to 1999, she coached the women's team of Ilioupoli Thessaloniki in the Greek A Division, winning the league title in the 1996–97 season. She also coached the women's team Centaur Larissa (1991 to 1992) and men's team Alexander (1994 to 1995). Konstantinidou was the technical adviser of the Greece women's national team from 2000 until 2002, before coaching the team from 2002 to 2004. She took charge of 57 matches of the team, finishing with a record of 19 wins, 12 draws and 26 losses. She was the team's coach at the 2004 Summer Olympics.

== Personal life ==
Konstantinidou was born in the Agios Athanasios community of the Doxato municipality. She graduated from the School of Physical Education and Sport Sciences at the Aristotle University of Thessaloniki, having specialised in football. She received a master's degree in coaching from the school's postgraduate study program in 2001, and earned a PhD from the Department of Physical Education of the Democritus University of Thrace. From 1993 to 1998 she taught at the Democritus University of Thrace, and at the Aristotle University of Thessaloniki since 2001. She has written multiple books, including "Football Book for Gymnasts" (1990) and "Football Handbook" (2002), and has published in scientific journals.
