= Athanasia Pouridou =

Greek footballer

Personal information
- Date of birth: 22 January 1975 (age 51)
- Place of birth: Greece
- Position: Defender

Senior career*
Years	Team	Apps	(Gls)
2004	Kavala 86		

International career
2004	Greece	63 (?)	(0)
- * Club domestic league appearances and goals

Athanasia Pouridou (born 22 January 1975) is a Greek former footballer who played as a defender.

Pouridou was part of the Greece women's national football team at the 2004 Summer Olympics. On club level she played for Kavala 86.

== See also ==
- Greece at the 2004 Summer Olympics
