= Angeliki Lagoumtzi =

Greek footballer

Personal information
- Date of birth: 23 November 1982 (age 43)
- Place of birth: Greece
- Position: Midfielder

Senior career*
Years	Team	Apps	(Gls)
2004	Kavala 86		

International career
2004	Greece	56 (?)	(3)
- * Club domestic league appearances and goals

Angeliki Lagoumtzi (born 23 November 1982) is a Greek former footballer who played as a midfielder.

Lagoumtzi was part of the Greece women's national football team at the 2004 Summer Olympics. On club level she played for Kavala 86.

== See also ==
- Greece at the 2004 Summer Olympics
