= Tanya Kalivas =

American-born Greek footballer

Personal information
- Full name: Tanya Eleni Kalivas
- Date of birth: 26 August 1979 (age 47)
- Place of birth: Franklin Lakes, New Jersey, U.S.
- Height: 1.70 m (5 ft 7 in)
- Position: Midfielder

Youth career
- 2001: Princeton Tigers

Senior career*
Years	Team	Apps	(Gls)
2002	San Francisco Nighthawks		
2003	California Storm		

International career
2004	Greece		
- * Club domestic league appearances and goals

Tanya Eleni Kalivas (born 26 August 1979), known in Greece as Tanya Kalyvas (Greek: Τάνια Καλύβα), is a former footballer who played as a midfielder. Born in the United States, she had been a member of the Greece women's national team.

== College career ==
Kalivas attended the Princeton University in Princeton, New Jersey.

== Club career ==
Kalivas played for the California Storm in the WPSL.

== International career ==
Kalivas was one of eight American-born players that competed for the Greece women's national football team at the 2004 Summer Olympics. She participated in the build-up to the Olympic tournament by playing in several friendlies, including a draw with Russia on 22 February 2004. She made two appearances at the final tournament as Greece finished last.

== Personal life ==
Kalivas is married to fellow footballer Martha West, whom she met when playing on opposite sides in a New York Metropolitan Women's Soccer League game. Before the wedding Kalivas and West played a football match, captaining teams consisting of their friends and family, to decide who would take the surname of whom. The match ended in a 1–1 draw, so they decided they would both keep their names.
