= Anastasia Papadopoulou =

Greek footballer (born 1986)

Personal information
- Date of birth: 1 July 1986 (age 40)
- Place of birth: Drama, Greece
- Height: 1.55 m (5 ft 1 in)
- Position: Midfielder

Senior career*
Years	Team	Apps	(Gls)
2003–2009	Kavala 86		
2009–2018	Amazones Dramas		
2026–	AEK Kavalas		

International career
2003–2018	Greece	104	(15)
Medal record
Greek Champion 2014
- * Club domestic league appearances and goals

Anastasia Papadopoulou (born 1 July 1986) is a Greek football player who plays as a midfielder for AEK Kavalas in the Gamma Ethniki. She was part of the Greece women's national football team at the 2004 Summer Olympics.

She was an international with the Women's Greek national team and one of the team's captains, making 104 appearances from 2003 to 2018.

She previously played for Kavala 86 and Amazones Dramas before retiring in 2018. In the summer of 2026, she came out of retirement to join AEK Kavala in the Greek third tier, alongside her former national team teammate Dimitra Panteliadou.

== Club career ==
In August 2014, Papadopoulou captained Amazones Dramas at the UEFA Women's Champions League, where they qualified for the first time ever in their history. She appeared in every match, scoring 3 goals in 3 matches.

== International career ==
Papadopoulou appeared 104 times for the Greece women's national football team, including one appearance in the 2003 FIFA Women's World Cup qualifying rounds and appearances at the 2004 Summer Olympics in Athens.

== Honours ==
Amazones Dramas

- A Division: 2013–14; runner-up: 2014–15
- Greek Cup runner-up: 2013–14, 2015–16

== See also ==
- List of women's footballers with 100 or more international caps
- Greece at the 2004 Summer Olympics
