= Ning Zhenyun =

Chinese footballer

Ning Zhenyun (simplified Chinese: 宁珍云; traditional Chinese: 寧珍雲; pinyin: Zhù Zhēnyún; born June 2, 1982, in Qingdao, Shandong) is a female Chinese football (soccer) player who competed at the 2004 Summer Olympics.

In 2004, she was a squad member of the Chinese team which finished ninth in the women's tournament.
