= Salina Olsson =

Swedish former football forward (born 1978)

Personal information
- Full name: Salina Kristin Olsson
- Date of birth: 29 August 1978 (age 48)
- Place of birth: Trångsund, Huddinge, Sweden
- Height: 1.67 m (5 ft 6 in)
- Position: Forward

Youth career
- 1984–1986: Trångsunds IF
- 1987: Rönninge SK
- 1988–1994: Hammarby IF

Senior career*
Years	Team	Apps	(Gls)
1995–1999	Djurgårdens IF		
2000–2005	Hammarby IF	117	(67)
2006–2007	Kopparbergs/Göteborg FC	41	(11)

International career
1997–2007	Sweden	67	(9)
- * Club domestic league appearances and goals

Salina Kristin Olsson (born 29 August 1978) is a Swedish former football forward who played for the Sweden women's national football team at the 2004 Summer Olympics. At the club level, she played for Hammarby IF, Djurgårdens IF and Kopparbergs/Göteborg FC.

== See also ==
- Sweden at the 2004 Summer Olympics
