= Vasiliki Soupiadou =

Greek footballer

Personal information
- Date of birth: 6 April 1978 (age 48)
- Place of birth: Greece
- Position: Forward

Senior career*
Years	Team	Apps	(Gls)
2004	Aegina		

International career
2004	Greece	54 (?)	(5)
- * Club domestic league appearances and goals

Vasiliki (Note: The name in Greek is pronounced correctly as Vassiliki.) Soupiadou (born 6 April 1978) is a Greek former footballer who played as a forward, and also played for the Greece women's national football team.

She competed at the 2004 Summer Olympics. At the club level, she played for Aegina.

== See also ==
- Greece at the 2004 Summer Olympics
