= Konstantina Katsaiti =

Greek footballer

Personal information
- Date of birth: 17 May 1980 (age 46)
- Place of birth: Aegina, Greece
- Position: Defender

Senior career*
Years	Team	Apps	(Gls)
1990–2008	Aegina		
2008–2009	Aris Thessalinikis		
2009–2011	Glyfada		

International career
1994–2004	Greece	90	(14)

Managerial career
- 2014–2015: Glyfada
- 2017–2020: Glyfada
- 2021: Avantes Chalkidas
- 2021–2023: Odysseas Moscatou
- 2024–: Fostiras Kaisarianis
- * Club domestic league appearances and goals

Konstantina Katsaiti (born 17 May 1980) is a Greek football defender who played for the Greece women's national football team. She competed at the 2004 Summer Olympics. At the club level, she played for Aegina.

== Honours ==
Aegina

- Greek A Division (3): 2002/03, 2003/04, 2004/05
- Regional Championship (2): 1994/95, 1997/98

== See also ==
- Greece at the 2004 Summer Olympics
