= Maria Lazarou =

Greek footballer (born 1972)

Personal information
- Date of birth: 30 September 1972 (age 54)
- Place of birth: Serres, Greece
- Height: 1.70 m (5 ft 7 in)
- Position: Midfielder

Senior career*
Years	Team	Apps	(Gls)
- Artemis Drama
- Kavala 86
1994–1995	FC Rumeln-Kaldenhausen		
- Illiopouli Thessaloniki
- Olympiada Thessaloniki
2001–2004	PAOK		

International career
1991–2004	Greece	111	(26)

Managerial career
- 2006–2008: Illiopouli Thessaloniki
- 2008–2009: Aris
- * Club domestic league appearances and goals

Maria Lazarou (Greek: Μαρία Λαζάρου; born 30 September 1972) is a Greek former footballer who played for the Greece national team, which she also captained. She is also a former football coach.

== Club career ==
Lazarou played for several clubs in the Greek Alpha Ethniki, and also had a spell in-between in the German Fußball-Bundesliga with FC Rumeln-Kaldenhausen.

In 2002, Lazarou was part of the squad of PAOK that played in the UEFA Women's Champions League for the first time ever, in the 2002–03 season; PAOK lost in all three matches they played, but in the final match they managed to score for one and only time, in an 8–1 defeat, with Lazarou being the scorer.

Lazarou retired in 2004, after the 2004 Summer Olympics, but she returned to playing again in 2006 as a player-coach for Illiopouli Thessaloniki, and then Aris, a club founded in 2008, and being actually the successor team of Illiopouli; Aris actually "absorbed" Illiopouli, with the latter adopting the badge, name and colours of Aris, with the newly created club continuing to play in Women's Alpha Ethniki (top-tier league) in the place of Illiopouli.

== International career ==
Lazarou appeared 111 times for the Greece national team, including six appearances in the 2003 FIFA Women's World Cup qualifying rounds and appearances at the 2004 Summer Olympics in Athens, which she also captained, and is the top scorer of the Greece women's national football team with 26 goals.

== Managerial career ==
Lazarou, after having retired in 2004, returned to playing again in 2006 as a player-coach for Illiopouli Thessaloniki, and then Aris.

Nowadays, she is not involved with football and works as a private-sector employee.

== Honours ==
Lazarou won four Greek A Division (top-tier league) with four different clubs and one league in Germany with the semi-professional team of FC Rumeln-Kaldenhausen.

== See also ==
- List of women's footballers with 100 or more international caps
- Greece at the 2004 Summer Olympics
