= Eftichia Michailidou =

Greek footballer (born 1977)

Personal information
- Date of birth: 20 September 1977 (age 49)
- Place of birth: Greece
- Position: Midfielder

Senior career*
Years	Team	Apps	(Gls)
1991–2007	Kavala 86		
2007–2008	Ilioupoli Thessalonikis		
- Amazones Dramas

International career
1991–2008	Greece	80 (?)	(6)

Managerial career
- 2010–2013: Megas Alexandros Agiou Athanasiou (assistant)
- 2013–2016: Amazones Dramas (assistant)
- * Club domestic league appearances and goals

Eftichia "Efi" Michailidou (born 20 September 1977) is a Greek retired football midfielder who played for the Greece women's national football team. She competed for Greece at the 2004 Summer Olympics. At the club level, she played for Kavala 86.
