= Natalia Chatzigiannidou =

Greek footballer (born 1979)

Personal information
- Date of birth: 19 July 1979 (age 47)
- Place of birth: Florina, Greece
- Height: 1.74 m (5 ft 9 in)
- Positions: Defender; midfielder; forward

Youth career
- Filiriakos Florinas

Senior career*
Years	Team	Apps	(Gls)
1991–2007	Filiriakos Florinas		
2007–2020	PAOK		
2021	Agrotikos Asteras	10	(2)
2022	Asteras Rethymno	6	(4)
2022–2024	REA	31	(2)

International career^{‡}
1997	Greece U18		
1997–2020	Greece	161	(11)
2019–2022	Greece military	1+	
- * Club domestic league appearances and goals as of 4 June 2026 ‡ National team caps and goals as of 4 June 2026

Natalia Chatzigiannidou (Greek: Ναταλία Χατζηγιαννίδου; born 19 June 1979) is a Greek former footballer. During her career, she mostly played for Filiriakos Florinas and PAOK, while also making appearances for Agrotikos Asteras, Asteras Rethymnou and REA. She has won the Greek A Division 13 times and the Greek Cup five times. She was the captain of Greece women's national football team, until her retirement in 2020, and she is currently the country's most capped player.

== Club career ==
Chatzigiannidou was born on 19 July 1979 in Florina, Greece, and started her career at the age of 12 with the local club Filiriakos Florinas in 1991, which was also the year the club was founded, where she won an A Division league (women's top-tier league) title in 2000, and played for the club until 2007.

Chatzigiannidou's tenure in Filiriakos coincided with the club's golden years; Regional Championship in 1992–93 season and promotion; in addition to the 2000 A Division title, they were also runners-up in 1998, 2001, 2002 and 2004, and third in 1999; the successes include presences in European tournaments such as Women's Cup of Italy (version of Sicily in 2003), which was organized jointly by UEFA and the Italian Football Federation (FIGC), where the club was honoured by the latter, and the International Tournament of Pecquencourt among others, and a 3–0 victorious friendly match against Women's national team for 2005 Prespes Festival on 27 August 2005, where Chatzigiannidou scored the third goal, an era the club provided the national teams with 24 footballers during their 15 years of existence, until 2006, of being herself an international footballer, and also serving the club from the position of the captain.

In 2007, Chatzigiannidou moved to PAOK, where she played over 200 matches, including 30 appearances for UEFA Women's Champions League, and winning 12 A Division leagues and 5 Women's Cups until 2020, when she decided to leave the club due to disgruntlement for the way the club was treating her at the time and was released by the club after an appeal to the Hellenic Football Federation.

In April 2021, Chatzigiannidou joined Agrotikos Asteras Women.

On 27 January 2022, Chatzigiannidou joined Asteras Ladies Rethymno, having been incorporated with a delay due to professional reasons, after having agreed with the club since October 2021, a transfer which has been described as the club's most important transfer ever in its history.

For the season 2022–23, Chatzigiannidou joined REA, the successor club of Asteras Ladies Rethymno.

== International career ==
=== Greece ===
On 2 November 1997, Chatzigiannidou made her debut for Greece women's national football team in a match against Yugoslavia, where she also scored.

Chatzigiannidou was also part of the squad that competed at the 2004 Summer Olympics.

On 26 January 2016, Chatzigiannidou made her 139th top level international appearance and tied Giorgos Karagounis, in a match against Albania for the UEFA Women's Euro 2017 qualifiers, a feat combined with remarkable stability in the national team, having played in 139 matches out of 146 available since her debut.

On 8 March 2016, after making her 140th appearance in a match against Ukraine for the UEFA Women's Euro 2017 qualifiers, Chatzigiannidou surpassed Giorgos Karagounis' previous record, becoming the most capped Greek footballer in the history of the Greece national teams (including both men's and women's), and after the match was awarded a commemorative cap jointly by the Hellenic Football Federation and UEFA for the feat.

Chatzigiannidou would then go on extending her record, reaching 145 appearances until January 2017, for a tally she was awarded by Macedonia Football Clubs Association (EPSM), until 13 June 2017 had reached the remarkable number of 150 appearances, and, having made over 160 international appearances, she currently (27 January 2022) remains the most capped player in the history of the Greece national team, which she also captains.

=== Greece military ===
Chatzigiannidou additionally played for the Greece women's national military football team at least once in 2019, in a qualifier match for the 2019 CISM Military World Games, and she has also been at least in a respective selection again in 2022 for an unofficial charity friendly match against Ladies FC Ialysos club, which was also a celebration match for the club's promotion to the A Division, for a match she was called up alongside the club teammate Argiro Karamousadaki, who was also called up, with the club congratulating both of them for the honour in an announcement.

== Honours ==
Filiriakos Florinas

- Greek A Division (1): 1999–00; runners-up: 1997–98, 2000–01, 2001–02, 2003–04
- Greek Regional Championship (1): 1992–93

PAOK

- Greek A Division (12): 2007–08, 2008–09, 2009–10, 2010–11, 2011–12, 2012–13, 2014–15, 2015–16, 2016–17, 2017–18, 2018–19, 2019–20
- Greek Cup (5): 2012–13, 2013–14, 2014–15, 2015–16, 2017

== See also ==
- List of women's footballers with 100 or more international caps
- Greece at the 2004 Summer Olympics
