= Dimitra Panteliadou =

Greek footballer

Personal information
- Full name: Dimitra Panteliadou
- Date of birth: 15 February 1986 (age 40)
- Place of birth: Eptalofos, Kilkis, Greece
- Height: 1.56 m (5 ft 1 in)
- Position: Striker

Team information
- Current team: AEK Kavalas

Youth career
- 1992–2000: PAONE Eptalofou

Senior career*
Years	Team	Apps	(Gls)
2001–2018	PAOK	310	(280)
2018–2020	Aris		
2020–2023	Ialysos	1	(2)
2023–2024	Leontes Thessalonikis		
2024	PAS Lesbos		
2024–2026	Panserraiki	49	(20)
2026–	AEK Kavalas		

International career
2002–2018	Greece	74	(20)
- * Club domestic league appearances and goals as of 11 August 2026

Dimitra Panteliadou is a Greek football striker currently playing for AEK Kavalas in the Gamma Ethniki. She was a member of the Greece national team, playing the 2004 Summer Olympics.
