= Greece women's national football team =

Women's national association football team representing Greece

Greece
- Association: Hellenic Football Federation
- Confederation: UEFA (Europe)
- Head coach: Vasilis Spertos
- Captain: Eleni Markou
- Most caps: Natalia Chatzigiannidou (161)
- Top scorer: Maria Lazarou; Sophia Koggouli (26 goals)
- Home stadium: Theodoros Vardinogiannis Stadium
- FIFA code: GRE
| First colours | Second colours | Third colours |

FIFA ranking
- Current: 58 ▲1 (20 October 2026)
- Highest: 50 (September 2008)
- Lowest: 74 (September 2014)

First international
- Italy 6–0 Greece (Viterbo, Italy; 3 July 1991)

Biggest win
- Greece 14–0 Lebanon (Pegeia, Cyprus; 12 March 2015)

Biggest defeat
- Belgium 11–0 Greece (Leuven, Belgium; 13 September 2014)

The Greece women's national football team (Greek: εθνική ομάδα ποδοσφαίρου γυναικών Ελλάδας, romanized: ethnikí omáda podosfaírou gynaikón Elládas) represents Greece in international women's football. The team is controlled by the Hellenic Football Federation (HFF), the governing body for football in Greece.

The team plays its home matches at various stadiums across Greece. As of 2026, the team is captained by Eleni Markou and the team achieved a FIFA ranking of 59 as of June 16, 2026. Their highest ever FIFA ranking was 50th in September 2008. Their biggest victory was 14–0 win against Lebanon on March 12, 2015. Greece have never qualified for a FIFA Women's World Cup or a UEFA Women's Championship. The only international tournament the team has ever participated in was the 2004 Summer Olympics in Athens. Automatically qualified as the hosts, they lost all three matches in their group without scoring a goal. Greece is currently competing in the 2027 FIFA Women's World Cup qualification cycle, where they have advanced to face England in the qualification play-offs scheduled for October 2026.

== Results and fixtures ==
The following is a list of match results in the last 12 months, as well as any future matches that have been scheduled.

Legend

Win Draw Loss Fixture

=== 2025 ===
| 29 November Friendly | Belarus | 0–2 | Greece | Zenica, Bosnia and Herzegovina |
| 16:00 EET | | Report | Pouliou 66'; Brookshire 70' | Stadium: Bosnia and Herzegovina FA Training Centre; Referee: Aida Jusufović (Bosnia and Herzegovina) |

| 2 December Friendly | Bosnia and Herzegovina | 1–1 | Greece | Zenica, Bosnia and Herzegovina |
| 14:30 EET | Grebenar 60' | Report | Koggouli 43' (pen.) | Stadium: Bosnia and Herzegovina FA Training Centre |

=== 2026 ===
| 3 March 2027 FIFA Women's World Cup qualification – League C – Group 4 | Greece | 3–0 | Georgia | Heraklion, Greece |
| 18:30 EET | Markou 20'; Brookshire 80'; Tzourtzevits 86' | Report | | Stadium: Theodoros Vardinogiannis Stadium; Referee: Lizzy van der Helm (Netherlands) |

| 7 March 2027 FIFA Women's World Cup qualification – League C – Group 4 | Greece | 2–0 | Faroe Islands | Heraklion, Greece |
| 20:30 EET | Sarri 2' (pen.); Koggouli 78' | Report | | Stadium: Theodoros Vardinogiannis Stadium; Referee: Jelena Jermolajeva (Latvia) |

| 14 April 2027 FIFA Women's World Cup qualification – League C – Group 4 | Faroe Islands | 2–3 | Greece | Tórshavn, Faroe Islands |
| 19:00 EEST | Johannesen 9'; Ryan 90+6' | Report | Moraitou 8'; Giannaka 53'; Drakogiannaki 78' | Stadium: Tórsvøllur; Referee: Hanna Laajanen (Sweden) |

| 18 April Friendly | Greece | 1–1 | Moldova | Athens, Greece |
| 16:00 EEST | Paterna 60' | Report | Rubanovici 90' | Stadium: Nea Smyrni Stadium; Referee: Roxana Timiș (Romania) |

| 9 June 2027 FIFA Women's World Cup qualification – League C – Group 4 | Georgia | 2–3 | Greece | Tbilisi, Georgia |
| 20:00 EEST | Theodoraki 6' (o.g.); Brame 63' (o.g.) | Report | Chalatsogianni 3'; Theodoraki 22'; Brookshire 60' | Stadium: Mikheil Meskhi Stadium; Referee: Veronika Vasylchenko (Ukraine) |

| 9 October 2027 FIFA Women's World Cup qualification – play-offs | Greece | 1–3 | England | Heraklion, Greece |
| 19:30 EET | Brookshire 78' | Report (FIFA); Report (UEFA) | Stanway 39'; Le Tissier 63'; Russo 67' | Stadium: Pankritio Stadium; Attendance: 3,942; Referee: Martina Molinaro (Italy) |

| 13 October 2027 FIFA Women's World Cup qualification – play-offs | England | 5–0 | Greece | Leicester, England |
| 20:30 (19:30 UTC+1) | Russo 3', 75'; James 16', 35'; Stanway 30' | Report (FIFA); Report (UEFA) | | Stadium: King Power Stadium; Attendance: 18,587; Referee: Rasa Grigonė (Lithuania) |

| 27 November Friendly | Northern Ireland | v | Greece | Larne, Northern Ireland |
| 21:00 EET | | Report | | Stadium: Inver Park |

| 1 December Friendly | Northern Ireland | v | Greece | Larne, Northern Ireland |
| 18:00 EET | | Report | | Stadium: Inver Park |

- Official results and fixtures

== Coaching staff ==
=== Current coaching staff ===
| Position | Name | Ref. |
|---|---|---|
| Head coach | Vasilis Spertos | |
| Assistant coach | Katerina Tsiapanou | |
| Goalkeeping coach | Lampros Spintzos | |

=== Manager history ===
- Xanthi Konstantinidou (2002–04)
- Vasilios Georgopoulos (2009–10)
- Vangelis Koutsakis (2011–14)
- Dimosthenis Kavouras (2014–18)
- Antonios Prionas (2018–20)
- Georgios Kyriazis (2020–2023)
- Alexandros Katikaridis (2023–2025)
- Vasilis Spertos (2025–present)

== Players ==
=== Current squad ===
The following 26 players were called up for friendly matches against Northern Ireland on 27 November and 1 December 2026.

Caps and goals correct as of 14 October 2026, after the match against England.

| No. | Pos. | Player | Date of birth (age) | Caps | Goals | Club |
|---|---|---|---|---|---|---|
| | GK | Rafaella Petaloti | 8 November 2007 (age 19) | 8 | 0 | (Italian Football Federation) Moncalieri |
| | GK | Ariana Anastasiadis | 28 February 2001 (age 25) | 1 | 0 | (Scottish Football Association) Hibernian |
| | GK | Celia Katergiannaki | 10 December 2005 (age 20) | 2 | 0 | (Hellenic Football Federation) Panathinaikos |
| | DF | Eleni Markou | 29 March 1995 (age 31) | 80 | 10 | (Turkish Football Federation) Galatasaray |
| | DF | Marina Theodoraki | 30 April 2007 (age 19) | 2 | 1 | (Polish Football Association) Medyk Konin |
| | DF | Panagiota Papaioannou | 29 June 1999 (age 27) | 0 | 0 | (The Football Association) Exeter City |
| | DF | Maria Gkouni | 26 September 2004 (age 22) | 17 | 0 | (Hellenic Football Federation) PAOK |
| | DF | Maria Kapnisi | 3 June 1999 (age 27) | 12 | 1 | (Hellenic Football Federation) AEK |
| | DF | Maria Paterna | 8 April 2000 (age 26) | 38 | 1 | (Hellenic Football Federation) Asteras Tripolis |
| | DF | Matina Ntarzanou | 8 June 2005 (age 21) | 8 | 0 | (Hellenic Football Federation) Panathinaikos |
| | DF | Sofia Zagkli | 24 September 2006 (age 20) | 4 | 0 | (Hellenic Football Federation) AEK |
| | MF | Athanasia Moraitou | 2 April 1997 (age 29) | 74 | 2 | (Swiss Football Association) Luzern |
| | MF | Georgia Chalatsogianni | 4 April 2005 (age 21) | 20 | 1 | (Swiss Football Association) Young Boys |
| | MF | Veatriki Sarri (captain) | 1 January 1998 (age 28) | 69 | 12 | (The Football Association) Birmingham City |
| | MF | Argyro Fakinou | 3 September 2006 (age 20) | 0 | 0 | (United States Soccer Federation) Ohio Bobcats |
| | MF | Athanasia Tsaroucha | 29 September 2005 (age 21) | 0 | 0 | (German Football Association) SC Sand |
| | MF | Eleni Saich | 9 February 2001 (age 25) | 18 | 0 | (Hellenic Football Federation) AEK |
| | MF | Efi Brame | 20 January 2000 (age 26) | 4 | 0 | (Hellenic Football Federation) PAOK |
| | MF | Eleftheria Drakogiannaki | 3 November 2001 (age 25) | 7 | 1 | (Hellenic Football Federation) PAOK |
| | MF | Grigoria Pouliou | 23 October 2000 (age 26) | 35 | 4 | (Hellenic Football Federation) Panathinaikos |
| | FW | Calliste Brookshire | 9 July 2002 (age 24) | 11 | 4 | (Scottish Football Association) Rangers |
| | FW | Ioanna Papatheodorou | 27 November 2003 (age 22) | 18 | 0 | (Royal Belgian Football Association) OH Leuven |
| | FW | Marianna Rapani | 29 May 2005 (age 21) | 3 | 0 | (United States Soccer Federation) Mercer Bears |
| | FW | Vasiliki Giannaka | 13 October 2004 (age 22) | 34 | 1 | (Hellenic Football Federation) PAOK |
| | FW | Sophia Koggouli | 26 July 1991 (age 35) | 97 | 26 | (Hellenic Football Federation) AEK |
| | FW | Electra Tzourtzevits | 5 January 2007 (age 19) | 6 | 1 | (Hellenic Football Federation) Panathinaikos |

=== Recent call-ups ===
The following players have also been called up to the squad within the past 12 months.

| Pos. | Player | Date of birth (age) | Caps | Goals | Club | Latest call-up |
|---|---|---|---|---|---|---|
| GK | Dimitra Giannakouli | 8 May 1998 (age 28) | 18 | 0 | (Greece) AEK | v. England, 13 October 2026 |
| DF | Maria Palama | 14 June 2000 (age 26) | 39 | 0 | (Hungary) Budapest Honvéd | v. England, 13 October 2026 |
| DF | Androniki Michalopoulou | 11 June 1998 (age 28) | 5 | 0 | (Hungary) Puskás Akadémia | v. Georgia, 9 June 2026 |
| DF | Stacey Papadopoulos | 17 December 1996 (age 29) | 7 | 0 | Free agent | v. Georgia, 9 June 2026 |
| DF | Dimitra Karapetsa | 2 January 2000 (age 26) | 7 | 0 | (Cyprus) Aris Limassol | v. Moldova, 18 April 2026 |
| DF | Xanthi Misirli | 14 February 1998 (age 28) | 1 | 0 | (Greece) Olympiacos | v. Moldova, 18 April 2026 |
| DF | Markella Koskeridou | 15 May 2000 (age 26) | 10 | 0 | (Greece) PAOK | v. Faroe Islands, 14 April 2026^{INJ} |
| DF | Maria Mitkou | 11 April 1994 (age 32) | 69 | 5 | (Greece) PAOK | v. Bosnia and Herzegovina, 2 December 2025 |
| DF | Georgia Pavlopoulou | 4 December 2004 (age 21) | 6 | 0 | (Greece) AEK | v. Bosnia and Herzegovina, 2 December 2025 |
| MF | Griselda Tsela | 3 August 2008 (age 18) | 1 | 0 | (Poland) Pogoń Szczecin | v. England, 13 October 2026 |
| MF | Maria Vlassopoulou | 8 November 2001 (age 25) | 1 | 0 | (Italy) Hellas Verona | v. Georgia, 9 June 2026 |
| FW | Panagiota Argyriou | 23 February 2008 (age 18) | 4 | 0 | (Greece) PAOK | v. England, 13 October 2026 |
| FW | Ioanna Chamalidou | 11 October 1996 (age 30) | 23 | 0 | (Greece) Asteras Tripolis | v. Moldova, 18 April 2026 |
| FW | Anastasia Spyridonidou | 11 June 1997 (age 29) | 58 | 19 | (Greece) AEK | v. Moldova, 18 April 2026 |
| FW | Despoina Chatzinikolaou | 21 October 1999 (age 27) | 21 | 1 | (Greece) AEK | v. Moldova, 18 April 2026 |
| FW | Eleni Garyfallidou | 21 April 1999 (age 27) | 0 | 0 | | v. Faroe Islands, 7 March 2026 |
Notes: ^{INJ} = Withdrew due to injury; ^{MED} = Withdrew due to medical reasons; ^{PRE} = Preliminary squad

=== Captains ===
- Evangelia Brisimi (??–2000)
- Maria Lazarou (2001–2003)
- Eftichia Michailidou (2002–2008)
- Natalia Chatzigiannidou (2003–2020)
- Eleni Kakambouki (2020–2025)
- Eleni Markou (2025–present)

== Records ==
- Active players in **bold**, statistics correct as of 2026.

=== Most capped players ===
| # | Player | Year(s) | Caps | Ref. |
|---|---|---|---|---|
| **1** | Natalia Chatzigiannidou | 1997–2020 | 161 | |
| **2** | Eleni Kakambouki | 2005–2025 | 116 | |
| **3** | Maria Lazarou | 1991–2004 | 111 | |
| **4** | Anastasia Papadopoulou | 2003–2018 | 104 | |

=== Top goalscorers ===
| # | Player | Year(s) | Goals | Caps | Ref. |
|---|---|---|---|---|---|
| **1** | **Sophia Koggouli** | 2009– | 26 | 97 | |
| **2** | Maria Lazarou | 1991–2004 | 26 | 111 | |
| **3** | Dimitra Panteliadou | 2002–2018 | 20 | 74 | |
| **4** | **Anastasia Spyridonidou** | 2016– | 19 | 58 | |

== Competitive record ==
=== FIFA Women's World Cup ===
| FIFA Women's World Cup record | | | | | | | | | Qualification record | | | | | | |
| Year | Result | Pld | W | D* | L | GF | GA | GD | Pld | W | D* | L | GF | GA | GD |
| (China) 1991 | Did not enter | | | | | | | | UEFA Women's Euro 1991 | | | | | | |
| (Sweden) 1995 | Did not qualify | | | | | | | | UEFA Women's Euro 1995 | | | | | | |
| (United States) 1999 | Did not qualify | | | | | | | | 6 | 1 | 1 | 4 | 8 | 18 | –10 |
| (United States) 2003 | Did not qualify | | | | | | | | 6 | 1 | 0 | 5 | 7 | 19 | –12 |
| (China) 2007 | Did not qualify | | | | | | | | 8 | 0 | 0 | 8 | 2 | 28 | –26 |
| (Germany) 2011 | Did not qualify | | | | | | | | 8 | 3 | 0 | 5 | 11 | 20 | –9 |
| (Canada) 2015 | Did not qualify | | | | | | | | 10 | 1 | 0 | 9 | 6 | 49 | –43 |
| (France) 2019 | Did not qualify | | | | | | | | 3 | 2 | 0 | 1 | 8 | 2 | +6 |
| (Australia) (New Zealand) 2023 | Did not qualify | | | | | | | | 10 | 4 | 1 | 5 | 12 | 28 | −16 |
| (Brazil) 2027 | To be determined | | | | | | | | To be determined | | | | | | |
| (Costa Rica) (Jamaica) (Mexico) (United States) 2031 | To be determined | | | | | | | | To be determined | | | | | | |
| (United Kingdom) 2035 | To be determined | | | | | | | | To be determined | | | | | | |
| Total | – | – | – | – | – | – | – | – | 51 | 12 | 2 | 37 | 54 | 148 | —110 |

*Draws include knockout matches decided on penalty kicks.

=== Olympic Games ===
Summer Olympics record
| Year | Result | Position | Pld | W | D* | L | GF | GA |
|---|---|---|---|---|---|---|---|---|
| (United States) 1996 | Did not qualify | | | | | | | |
| (Australia) 2000 | Did not qualify | | | | | | | |
| (Greece) 2004 | Group stage | 10th | 3 | 0 | 0 | 3 | 0 | 11 |
| (China) 2008 | Did not qualify | | | | | | | |
| (United Kingdom) 2012 | Did not qualify | | | | | | | |
| (Brazil) 2016 | Did not qualify | | | | | | | |
| (Japan) 2020 | Did not qualify | | | | | | | |
| (France) 2024 | Unable to qualify (Note: Greece was unable to qualify since Greece was in League B in the 2023–24 UEFA Women's Nations League.) | | | | | | | |
| (United States) 2028 | To be determined | | | | | | | |
| (Australia) 2032 | To be determined | | | | | | | |
| Total | Group stage | 1/8 | 3 | 0 | 0 | 3 | 0 | 11 |

*Draws include knockout matches decided on penalty kicks.

=== UEFA Women's Championship ===
| UEFA Women's Championship record | | | | | | | | | Qualifying record | | | | | | | | |
| Year | Result | Pld | W | D* | L | GF | GA | GD | Pld | W | D* | L | GF | GA | GD | P/R | Rnk |
| (England) (Italy) (Norway) (Sweden) 1984 | Did not enter | | | | | | | | Did not enter | | | | | | | | |
| (Norway) 1987 | Did not enter | | | | | | | | Did not enter | | | | | | | | |
| (West Germany) 1989 | Did not enter | | | | | | | | Did not enter | | | | | | | | |
| (Denmark) 1991 | Did not enter | | | | | | | | Did not enter | | | | | | | | |
| (Italy) 1993 | Did not qualify | | | | | | | | 4 | 0 | 1 | 3 | 0 | 6 | –6 | — | |
| (England) (Germany) (Norway) (Sweden) 1995 | Did not qualify | | | | | | | | 4 | 0 | 0 | 4 | 1 | 15 | –14 | — | |
| (Norway) (Sweden) 1997 | Did not qualify | | | | | | | | 6 | 1 | 1 | 4 | 3 | 10 | –7 | — | |
| (Germany) 2001 | Did not qualify | | | | | | | | 6 | 3 | 1 | 2 | 10 | 17 | –7 | — | |
| (England) 2005 | Did not qualify | | | | | | | | 6 | 4 | 1 | 1 | 23 | 6 | +17 | — | |
| (Finland) 2009 | Did not qualify | | | | | | | | 8 | 1 | 0 | 7 | 7 | 36 | –29 | — | |
| (Sweden) 2013 | Did not qualify | | | | | | | | 10 | 0 | 5 | 5 | 7 | 20 | –13 | — | |
| (Netherlands) 2017 | Did not qualify | | | | | | | | 8 | 2 | 0 | 6 | 9 | 19 | –10 | — | |
| (England) 2022 | Did not qualify | | | | | | | | 8 | 2 | 1 | 5 | 6 | 21 | –15 | — | |
| (Switzerland) 2025 | Did not qualify | | | | | | | | 8 | 5 | 2 | 1 | 17 | 9 | +8 | ▲ (Note: From Euro 2025 onwards a new qualifying format was introduced, linked to the Women's Nations League where teams are divided into leagues with promotion/relegation between the leagues at the end of each cycle.) | 36th |
| (Germany) 2029 | To be determined | | | | | | | | To be determined | | | | | | | | |
| Total | – | – | – | – | – | – | – | – | 68 | 18 | 12 | 38 | 83 | 159 | –76 | 36th | |

*Draws include knockout matches decided on penalty kicks.

=== UEFA Women's Nations League ===
UEFA Women's Nations League record
| Year | League | Group | Pos | Pld | W | D | L | GF | GA | P/R | Rnk |
|---|---|---|---|---|---|---|---|---|---|---|---|
| 2023–24 | B | 3 | 4th | 6 | 1 | 0 | 5 | 3 | 13 | ▼ | 29th |
| 2025 | B | 2 | To be determined | | | | | | | | |
| Total | | | | 6 | 1 | 0 | 5 | 3 | 13 | 29th | |

| ▲ | Promoted at end of season |
| Same position | No movement at end of season |
| ▼ | Relegated at end of season |
| * | Participated in promotion/relegation play-offs |

== See also ==
- Sport in Greece
  - Football in Greece
    - Women's football in Greece
- Greece women's national football team
  - Greece women's national football team results
  - List of Greece women's international footballers
- Greece women's national under-20 football team
- Greece women's national under-19 football team
- Greece women's national under-17 football team
- Greece men's national football team
