= 2019 World Table Tennis Championships – Men's doubles =

Men's doubles at the 2019 World Table Tennis Championships
- Venue: Hungexpo
- Location: Budapest, Hungary
- Dates: 22–27 April
- Final score: 11–3, 8–11, 11–7, 11–3, 11–5

Medalists
Ma Long; Wang Chuqin	China
Ovidiu Ionescu; Álvaro Robles	Romania; Spain
Tiago Apolónia; João Monteiro	Portugal
Liang Jingkun; Lin Gaoyuan	China

The men's doubles competition of the 2019 World Table Tennis Championships was held from 22 to 27 April 2019. Fan Zhendong and Xu Xin were the defending champions but neither of them competed this year.

Ma Long and Wang Chuqin won the title after defeating Ovidiu Ionescu and Álvaro Robles 11–3, 8–11, 11–7, 11–3, 11–5.

== Seeds ==
1. (Japan) Masataka Morizono / (Japan) Yuya Oshima (second round)
2. (Hong Kong) Ho Kwan Kit / (Hong Kong) Wong Chun Ting (quarterfinals)
3. (South Korea) Jeoung Young-sik / (South Korea) Lee Sang-su (quarterfinals)
4. (Sweden) Mattias Falck / (Sweden) Kristian Karlsson (quarterfinals)
5. (Hungary) Nándor Ecseki / (Hungary) Ádám Szudi (third round)
6. (Chinese Taipei) Chen Chien-an / (Chinese Taipei) Chuang Chih-yuan (third round)
7. (Romania) Ovidiu Ionescu / (Spain) Álvaro Robles (final)
8. (China) Liang Jingkun / (China) Lin Gaoyuan (semifinals)
9. (Hong Kong) Ng Pak Nam / (Hong Kong) Lam Siu Hang (second round)
10. (Belgium) Martin Allegro / (Belgium) Florent Lambiet (first round)
11. (Germany) Timo Boll / (Germany) Patrick Franziska (quarterfinals, withdrew)
12. (South Korea) Jang Woo-jin / (South Korea) Park Gang-hyeon (third round)
13. (Chinese Taipei) Lin Yun-ju / (Chinese Taipei) Wang Tai-wei (third round)
14. (Austria) Robert Gardos / (Austria) Daniel Habesohn (second round)
15. (Denmark) Jonathan Groth / (England) Liam Pitchford (third round)
16. (Japan) Tomokazu Harimoto / (Japan) Yuto Kizukuri (third round)
17. (Brazil) Eric Jouti / (Brazil) Gustavo Tsuboi (second round)
18. (China) Ma Long / (China) Wang Chuqin (champions)
19. (Poland) Marek Badowski / (Poland) Patryk Zatówka (first round)
20. (India) Sharath Kamal / (India) Sathiyan Gnanasekaran (first round)
21. (Belgium) Robin Devos / (Belgium) Cédric Nuytinck (second round)
22. (France) Tristan Flore / (France) Emmanuel Lebesson (third round)
23. (England) Paul Drinkhall / (England) Samuel Walker (first round)
24. (Egypt) Mohamed El-Beiali / (Egypt) Ahmed Saleh (second round)
25. (Paraguay) Marcelo Aguirre / (Paraguay) Alejandro Toranzos (first round)
26. (Belarus) Pavel Platonov / (Belarus) Vladimir Samsonov (second round)
27. (Slovakia) Samuel Kalužný / (Slovakia) Ľubomír Pištej (first round)
28. (Thailand) Padasak Tanviriyavechakul / (Thailand) Supanut Wisutmaythangkoon (first round)
29. (Australia) Hu Heming / (Australia) Kane Townsend (first round)
30. (India) Anthony Amalraj / (India) Manav Vikash Thakkar (first round)
31. (Brazil) Vitor Ishiy / (Brazil) Thiago Monteiro (second round)
32. (Sweden) Anton Källberg / (Sweden) Truls Möregårdh (second round)

== Draw ==
=== Key ===
- Q = Qualifier
- w/o = Walkover
- w/d = Withdraw
- r = Retired
- DQ = Disqualified

=== Finals ===
Semifinals									Final
	(Portugal) Tiago Apolónia (Portugal) João Monteiro	6	11	12	7	7	11	8
7	(Romania) Ovidiu Ionescu (Spain) Álvaro Robles	11	3	10	11	11	9	11	7	(Romania) Ovidiu Ionescu (Spain) Álvaro Robles	3	11	7	3	5
18	(China) Ma Long (China) Wang Chuqin	12	11	11	11				18	(China) Ma Long (China) Wang Chuqin	11	8	11	11	11
8	(China) Liang Jingkun (China) Lin Gaoyuan	10	7	7	5

=== Top half ===
==== Section 1 ====
First round
1	(Japan) Morizono (Japan) Oshima	11	11	11	11
(Hungary) Lakatos (Hungary) Majoros	7	6	7	4
(Luxembourg) Glod (Luxembourg) Mladenovic	11	4	6	6	3
22	(France) Flore (France) Lebesson	8	11	11	11	11
24	(Egypt) El-Beiali (Egypt) Saleh	13	14	11	8	11	8	11
(United States) Jha (United States) Liu	11	12	13	11	7	11	4
(Nigeria) Aruna (Nigeria) Omotayo	11	13	11	5	2	2
11	(Germany) Boll (Germany) Franziska	13	11	6	11	11	11
14	(Austria) Gardos (Austria) Habesohn	9	9	11	11	11	11
(Mexico) Madrid (Mexico) Villa	11	11	9	8	9	7
(Portugal) Apolónia (Portugal) Monteiro	11	11	12	11
23	(England) Drinkhall (England) Walker	2	9	10	2
17	(Brazil) Jouti (Brazil) Tsuboi	11	11	11	11
(Venezuela) Correa (Venezuela) Medina	9	5	8	7
(Argentina) Alto (Argentina) Cifuentes	7	11	11	4	5	7
5	(Hungary) Ecseki (Hungary) Szudi	11	8	8	11	11	11

Second round
1	(Japan) Morizono (Japan) Oshima	8	11	7	15	6	11	9
22	(France) Flore (France) Lebesson	11	7	11	13	11	6	11
24	(Egypt) El-Beiali (Egypt) Saleh	7	8	9	4
11	(Germany) Boll (Germany) Franziska	11	11	11	11
14	(Austria) Gardos (Austria) Habesohn	9	8	11	9	11	7
(Portugal) Apolónia (Portugal) Monteiro	11	11	7	11	9	11
17	(Brazil) Jouti (Brazil) Tsuboi	11	9	4	10	7
5	(Hungary) Ecseki (Hungary) Szudi	5	11	11	12	11

Third round
22	(France) Flore (France) Lebesson	9	4	8	11	11	11	8
11	(Germany) Boll (Germany) Franziska	11	11	11	9	7	6	11
(Portugal) Apolónia (Portugal) Monteiro	9	11	11	11	11
5	(Hungary) Ecseki (Hungary) Szudi	11	7	2	8	4

Quarterfinals
11	(Germany) Boll (Germany) Franziska
(Portugal) Apolónia (Portugal) Monteiro	w/o

==== Section 2 ====
First round
7	(Romania) Ionescu (Spain) Robles	13	11	11	11
(Russia) Gadiev (Russia) Skachkov	11	6	5	8
(Italy) Bobocica (Italy) Stoyanov	16	11	11	6	11	3	11
19	(Poland) Badowski (Poland) Zatówka	14	3	13	11	7	11	8
21	(Belgium) Devos (Belgium) Nuytinck	11	13	11	11
(Moldova) Putintica (Moldova) Ursu	9	11	4	7
(Germany) Qiu (Germany) Steger	11	6	7	11	9	7
15	(Denmark) Groth (England) Pitchford	3	11	11	7	11	11
12	(South Korea) Jang (South Korea) Park	11	11	11	11
(Egypt) K. Assar (Egypt) O. Assar	6	7	5	8
(Saudi Arabia) Alkhadrawi (Saudi Arabia) Bu Shulaybi	11	5	12	3	9
32	(Sweden) Källberg (Sweden) Möregårdh	8	11	14	11	11
30	(India) Anthony (India) Thakkar	11	8	8	4	5
(Singapore) Chew (Singapore) Poh	6	11	11	11	11
(Czech Republic) Jančařík (Czech Republic) Reitspies	4	2	6	8
4	(Sweden) Falck (Sweden) Karlsson	11	11	11	11

Second round
7	(Romania) Ionescu (Spain) Robles	11	9	11	11	11
(Italy) Bobocica (Italy) Stoyanov	6	11	7	5	7
21	(Belgium) Devos (Belgium) Nuytinck	11	9	8	7	7
15	(Denmark) Groth (England) Pitchford	9	11	11	11	11
12	(South Korea) Jang (South Korea) Park	11	11	11	11
32	(Sweden) Källberg (Sweden) Möregårdh	8	9	6	6
(Singapore) Chew (Singapore) Poh	6	4	9	9
4	(Sweden) Falck (Sweden) Karlsson	11	11	11	11

Third round
7	(Romania) Ionescu (Spain) Robles	11	11	11	9	11
15	(Denmark) Groth (England) Pitchford	7	6	9	11	8
12	(South Korea) Jang (South Korea) Park	9	8	11	12	5
4	(Sweden) Falck (Sweden) Karlsson	11	11	6	14	11

Quarterfinals
7	(Romania) Ionescu (Spain) Robles	11	11	13	11
4	(Sweden) Falck (Sweden) Karlsson	5	7	11	9

=== Bottom half ===
==== Section 3 ====
First round
3	(South Korea) Jeoung (South Korea) Lee	11	11	11	11
(North Korea) Ham (North Korea) Ri	6	7	4	5
(Chile) Burgos (Chile) Olivares	11	11	11	11
29	(Australia) Hu (Australia) Townsend	5	7	9	6
27	(Slovakia) Kalužný (Slovakia) Pištej	7	11	11	3	4
(Finland) Naumi (Finland) Oláh	11	8	13	11	11
(France) Akkuzu (France) Cassin	11	2	9	11	11	2	11
10	(Belgium) Allegro (Belgium) Lambiet	5	11	11	7	8	11	7
9	(Hong Kong) Ng (Hong Kong) Lam	11	13	13	11
(Romania) Pletea (Romania) Sipos	7	11	11	7
(Czech Republic) Polansky (Czech Republic) Sirucek	11	13	9	3	4
18	(China) Ma (China) Wang	8	15	11	11	11
25	(Paraguay) Aguirre (Paraguay) Toranzos	9	11	11	1	11	9
(Slovakia) Valuch (Slovakia) Wang	11	8	13	11	9	11
(Hungary) Andras (Hungary) Juhasz	6	7	4	4
6	(Chinese Taipei) Chen (Chinese Taipei) Chuang	11	11	11	11

Second round
3	(South Korea) Jeoung (South Korea) Lee	12	11	11	11
(Chile) Burgos (Chile) Olivares	10	3	4	4
(Finland) Naumi (Finland) Oláh	7	11	8	11	11	9	11
(France) Akkuzu (France) Cassin	11	9	11	5	9	11	5
9	(Hong Kong) Ng (Hong Kong) Lam	7	8	6	8
18	(China) Ma (China) Wang	11	11	11	11
(Slovakia) Valuch (Slovakia) Wang	5	12	4	11
6	(Chinese Taipei) Chen (Chinese Taipei) Chuang	11	14	11	13

Third round
3	(South Korea) Jeoung (South Korea) Lee	11	11	11	11
(Finland) Naumi (Finland) Oláh	9	3	9	2
18	(China) Ma (China) Wang	11	11	11	12
6	(Chinese Taipei) Chen (Chinese Taipei) Chuang	5	6	8	10

Quarterfinals
3	(South Korea) Jeoung (South Korea) Lee	11	6	5	11	6	9
18	(China) Ma (China) Wang	7	11	11	8	11	11

==== Section 4 ====
First round
8	(China) Liang (China) Lin	6	11	11	11	11
(Israel) Ben Ari (Israel) Tauber	11	2	3	6	6
(Chile) Gomez (Chile) Lamadrid	14	9	3	2	11	6
26	(Belarus) Platonov (Belarus) Samsonov	12	11	11	11	8	11
28	(Thailand) Tanviriyavechakul (Thailand) Wisutmaythangkoon	11	11	11	8	9	7	10
(Denmark) Lind (Denmark) Rasmussen	5	4	9	11	11	11	12
(Russia) Ivonin (Russia) Sidorenko	10	12	8	12	11	5
16	(Japan) Harimoto (Japan) Kizukuri	12	10	11	14	7	11
13	(Chinese Taipei) Lin (Chinese Taipei) Wang	9	11	11	17	12
(Kazakhstan) Gerassimenko (Austria) Levenko	11	5	5	15	10
(Kazakhstan) Kelbuganov (Kazakhstan) Zholudev	7	13	8	11	10
31	(Brazil) Ishiy (Brazil) Monteiro	11	15	11	8	12
20	(India) Kamal (India) Gnanasekaran	11	6	11	4	9	9
(Iran) Ni. Alamian (Iran) No. Alamian	9	11	8	11	11	11
(Serbia) Jevtović (Serbia) Peto	2	10	4	11	11	2
2	(Hong Kong) Ho (Hong Kong) Wong	11	12	11	9	8	11

Second round
8	(China) Liang (China) Lin	11	9	13	11	11
26	(Belarus) Platonov (Belarus) Samsonov	5	11	11	7	8
(Denmark) Lind (Denmark) Rasmussen	10	4	6	7
16	(Japan) Harimoto (Japan) Kizukuri	12	11	11	11
13	(Chinese Taipei) Lin (Chinese Taipei) Wang	5	11	11	11	11
31	(Brazil) Ishiy (Brazil) Monteiro	11	9	9	8	9
(Iran) Ni. Alamian (Iran) No. Alamian	10	9	5	2
2	(Hong Kong) Ho (Hong Kong) Wong	12	11	11	11

Third round
8	(China) Liang (China) Lin	11	11	13	9	11
16	(Japan) Harimoto (Japan) Kizukuri	6	7	11	11	2
13	(Chinese Taipei) Lin (Chinese Taipei) Wang	10	11	3	11	7	11	9
2	(Hong Kong) Ho (Hong Kong) Wong	12	8	11	9	11	5	11

Quarterfinals
8	(China) Liang (China) Lin	11	14	11	11
2	(Hong Kong) Ho (Hong Kong) Wong	9	12	7	3
