= Table tennis at the 2018 South American Games =

- Venue: Coliseo Polifuncional Evo Morales
- Dates: 2–7 June
- Nations: 10

There were 7 table tennis events at the 2018 South American Games in Cochabamba, Bolivia. 3 for men and 3 for women and one mixed. The events were held between June 2 and 7 at the Coliseo Polifuncional Evo Morales.

== Events ==
Event	Gold	Silver	Bronze
Men's singles	Vitor Ishiy; Brazil	Juan Lamadrid; Chile	Gustavo Gómez; Chile
Men's singles	Vitor Ishiy; Brazil	Juan Lamadrid; Chile	Marcelo Aguirre; Paraguay
Women's singles	Bruna Takahashi; Brazil	Gui Lin; Brazil	Daniela Ortega; Chile
Women's singles	Bruna Takahashi; Brazil	Gui Lin; Brazil	Luisa Zuluaga; Colombia
Men's doubles	Gaston Alto; Horacio Cifuentes; Argentina	Axel Gavilán; Marcelo Aguirre; Paraguay	Gustavo Gómez; Juan Lamadrid; Chile
Men's doubles	Gaston Alto; Horacio Cifuentes; Argentina	Axel Gavilán; Marcelo Aguirre; Paraguay	Eric Jouti; Vitor Ishiy; Brazil
Women's doubles	Bruna Takahashi; Jessica Yamada; Brazil	Judith Morales; Paulina Vega; Chile	Astrid Salazar; Nathaly Paredes; Ecuador
Women's doubles	Bruna Takahashi; Jessica Yamada; Brazil	Judith Morales; Paulina Vega; Chile	Luisa Zuluaga; Paula Medina; Colombia
Mixed doubles	Bruna Takahashi; Vitor Ishiy; Brazil 2	Joaquin Villegas; Paula Medina; Colombia	Camila Argüelles; Horacio Cifuentes; Argentina
Mixed doubles	Bruna Takahashi; Vitor Ishiy; Brazil 2	Joaquin Villegas; Paula Medina; Colombia	Astrid Salazar; Emiliano Riofrio; Ecuador
Men's Team	Eric Jouti; Vitor Ishiy; Thiago Monteiro; Brazil	Gustavo Gómez; Felipe Olivares; Juan Lamadrid; Chile	Horacio Cifuentes; Pablo Tabachnik; Gaston Alto; Argentina
Men's Team	Eric Jouti; Vitor Ishiy; Thiago Monteiro; Brazil	Gustavo Gómez; Felipe Olivares; Juan Lamadrid; Chile	Axel Gavilán; Darío Toranzos; Marcelo Aguirre; Paraguay
Women's Team	Bruna Takahashi; Jessica Yamada; Gui Lin; Brazil	Daniela Ortega; Judith Morales; Paulina Vega; Chile	Camila Obando; Gremlis Arvelo; Neridee Niño; Venezuela
Women's Team	Bruna Takahashi; Jessica Yamada; Gui Lin; Brazil	Daniela Ortega; Judith Morales; Paulina Vega; Chile	Luisa Zuluaga; Manuela Echeverry; Paula Medina; Colombia
