= 2023 World Table Tennis Championships – Mixed doubles =

Mixed doubles at the 2023 World Table Tennis Championships
- Venue: Durban International Convention Centre
- Location: Durban, KwaZulu-Natal, South Africa
- Dates: 20–26 May

Medalists
gold medal	Wang Chuqin; Sun Yingsha	China
silver medal	Tomokazu Harimoto; Hina Hayata	Japan
bronze medal	Wong Chun Ting; Doo Hoi Kem	Hong Kong
bronze medal	Lin Shidong; Kuai Man	China

The mixed doubles competition of the 2023 World Table Tennis Championships was held from 20 to 26 May 2023. The event was played as a straight knockout. All doubles matches were best of 5 games.

== Seeds ==
Doubles events had 16 seeded pairs. Seeding was based on the ITTF world ranking published on 16 May 2023.

1. (China) Wang Chuqin / (China) Sun Yingsha (champions)
2. (Japan) Tomokazu Harimoto / (Japan) Hina Hayata (final)
3. (France) Emmanuel Lebesson / (France) Jia Nan Yuan (second round)
4. (India) Sathiyan Gnanasekaran / (India) Manika Batra (third round)
5. (Chinese Taipei) Lin Yun-ju / (Chinese Taipei) Chen Szu-yu (quarterfinals)
6. (Hong Kong) Wong Chun Ting / (Hong Kong) Doo Hoi Kem (semifinals)
7. (China) Lin Shidong / (China) Kuai Man (semifinals)
8. (South Korea) Lim Jong-hoon / (South Korea) Shin Yu-bin (quarterfinals)
9. (Romania) Ovidiu Ionescu / (Romania) Bernadette Szőcs (second round)
10. (Spain) Álvaro Robles / (Spain) María Xiao (third round)
11. (Brazil) Vitor Ishiy / (Brazil) Bruna Takahashi (second round)
12. (Germany) Dang Qiu / (Germany) Nina Mittelham (third round)
13. (Slovakia) Ľubomír Pištej / (Slovakia) Barbora Balážová (second round)
14. (Hong Kong) Lee Ho Ching / (Hong Kong) Ho Kwan Kit (first round)
15. (Austria) Robert Gardos / (Austria) Sofia Polcanova (third round)
16. (India) Manav Vikash Thakkar / (India) Archana Girish Kamath (second round)

== Draw ==
The draw took place on 18 May. Players of the same association were separated only in the first round of the draw.

=== Key ===
- r = Retired
- w/o = Walkover

=== Finals ===
Semifinals
1	(China) Wang Chuqin (China) Sun Yingsha	9	11	10	11	11
6	(Hong Kong) Wong Chun Ting (Hong Kong) Doo Hoi Kem	11	7	12	5	8
7	(China) Kuai Man (China) Lin Shidong	11	6	7	6
2	(Japan) Hina Hayata (Japan) Tomokazu Harimoto	7	11	11	11

Final
1	(China) Wang Chuqin (China) Sun Yingsha	11	11	11
2	(Japan) Hina Hayata (Japan) Tomokazu Harimoto	6	2	7

=== Top half ===
==== Section 1 ====
First round
(Poland) Bajor (Poland) Badowski	6	4	11	11	11
(Egypt) Goda (Egypt) El-Beiali	11	11	8	6	5
(Chinese Taipei) Huang (Chinese Taipei) Li	11	11	9	10	11
(Chile) Ortega (Chile) Gomez	9	8	11	12	5
(Puerto Rico) Afanador (Puerto Rico) A. Díaz	6	8	11	6
15	(Austria) Polcanova (Austria) Gardos	11	11	6	11
10	(Spain) Robles (Spain) Xiao	11	11	11
(Argentina) Codina (Argentina) Alto	8	6	5
(Chile) Vega (Chile) Burgos	11	11	6	11
(Australia) Dixon (Australia) Tapper	9	9	11	9
(Uzbekistan) Panov (Uzbekistan) Magdieva
(Singapore) Zeng (Singapore) Chew	^{w/o}
(Italy) Stoyanov (Italy) Piccolin	11	8	3	8
5	(Chinese Taipei) Chen (Chinese Taipei) Lin	6	11	11	11

Second round
1	(China) Wang (China) Sun	11	11	5	11
(Poland) Bajor (Poland) Badowski	7	9	11	9
(Chinese Taipei) Huang (Chinese Taipei) Li	7	10	11	5
15	(Austria) Polcanova (Austria) Gardos	11	12	8	11
10	(Spain) Robles (Spain) Xiao	11	11	11
(Chile) Vega (Chile) Burgos	4	6	5
(Singapore) Zeng (Singapore) Chew	2	2	8
5	(Chinese Taipei) Chen (Chinese Taipei) Lin	11	11	11

Third round
1	(China) Wang (China) Sun	11	11	11
15	(Austria) Polcanova (Austria) Gardos	7	6	7
10	(Spain) Robles (Spain) Xiao	3	6	11	10
5	(Chinese Taipei) Chen (Chinese Taipei) Lin	11	11	6	12

Quarterfinals
1	(China) Wang (China) Sun	12	11	11
5	(Chinese Taipei) Chen (Chinese Taipei) Lin	10	8	9

==== Section 2 ====
First round
6	(Hong Kong) Wong (Hong Kong) Doo	11	11	11
(Italy) Oyebode (Italy) Monfardini	4	9	5
(Austria) Mischek (Austria) Chen	3	7	11	5
(Hungary) Ecseki (Hungary) Madarász	11	11	9	11
(Algeria) Bouloussa (Algeria) Loghraibi	11	16	8	9
(United States) Wang (United States) Kumar	7	18	11	11
(Puerto Rico) González (Puerto Rico) M. Díaz
16	(India) Thakkar (India) Kamath	^{w/o}
13	(Slovakia) Pištej (Slovakia) Balážová	11	11	11
(England) Ho (England) Pitchford	6	3	8
(Kazakhstan) Lavrova (Kazakhstan) Gerassimenko	3	9	6
(Sweden) Möregårdh (Sweden) Källberg	11	11	11
(Luxembourg) De Nutte (Luxembourg) Glod	5	3	5
(Brazil) Jouti (Brazil) Kumahara	11	11	11
(Luxembourg) Ni (Luxembourg) Mladenovic	11	8	16	7	6
4	(India) Batra (India) Gnanasekaran	9	11	14	11	11

Second round
6	(Hong Kong) Wong (Hong Kong) Doo	7	11	11	5	13
(Hungary) Ecseki (Hungary) Madarász	11	6	5	11	11
(United States) Wang (United States) Kumar	6	11	11	5	11
16	(India) Thakkar (India) Kamath	11	9	5	11	9
13	(Slovakia) Pištej (Slovakia) Balážová	5	5	11	6
(Sweden) Möregårdh (Sweden) Källberg	11	11	6	11
(Brazil) Jouti (Brazil) Kumahara	11	7	6	6
4	(India) Batra (India) Gnanasekaran	8	11	11	11

Third round
6	(Hong Kong) Wong (Hong Kong) Doo	11	11	11
(United States) Wang (United States) Kumar	7	6	2
(Sweden) Möregårdh (Sweden) Källberg	5	11	11	12
4	(India) Batra (India) Gnanasekaran	11	8	8	10

Quarterfinals
6	(Hong Kong) Wong (Hong Kong) Doo	11	11	11
(Sweden) Möregårdh (Sweden) Källberg	4	8	7

=== Bottom half ===
==== Section 3 ====
First round
3	(France) Yuan (France) Lebesson	7	4	11	11	11
(Germany) Shan (Germany) Franziska	11	11	8	8	9
(France) Gauzy (France) Pavade	8	11	11	11
(Romania) Diaconu (Romania) E. Ionescu	11	1	4	7
(United States) Liang (United States) Zhang	9	15	11	8	11
(Ukraine) Brateyko (Ukraine) Limonov	11	13	6	11	6
(Turkey) Yılmaz (Turkey) Yiğenler	1	7	11	4
12	(Germany) Mittelham (Germany) Qiu	11	11	8	11
14	(Hong Kong) Lee (Hong Kong) Ho	4	11	2	4
(South Korea) Cho (South Korea) Kim	11	9	11	11
(Egypt) Helmy (Egypt) Assar	4	4	8
(Canada) Wang (Canada) Zhang	11	11	11
(Slovakia) Kukuľková (Slovakia) Zelinka	11	11	5	11
(Poland) Węgrzyn (Poland) Kulczycki	9	8	11	5
(South Africa) Patel (South Africa) Nathoo	5	4	4
7	(China) Kuai (China) Lin	11	11	11

Second round
3	(France) Yuan (France) Lebesson	8	11	11	10	8
(France) Gauzy (France) Pavade	11	9	5	12	11
(United States) Liang (United States) Zhang	7	5	7
12	(Germany) Mittelham (Germany) Qiu	11	11	11
(South Korea) Cho (South Korea) Kim	12	11	8	11	11
(Canada) Wang (Canada) Zhang	14	6	11	6	9
(Slovakia) Kukuľková (Slovakia) Zelinka	8	12	6	5
7	(China) Kuai (China) Lin	11	10	11	11

Third round
(France) Gauzy (France) Pavade	9	11	9	11	11
12	(Germany) Mittelham (Germany) Qiu	11	8	11	6	7
(South Korea) Cho (South Korea) Kim	11	5	6
7	(China) Kuai (China) Lin	13	11	11

Quarterfinals
(France) Gauzy (France) Pavade	6	7	11	9
7	(China) Kuai (China) Lin	11	11	8	11

==== Section 4 ====
First round
8	(South Korea) Shin (South Korea) Lim	11	11	11
(Nigeria) Edem (Nigeria) Abiodun	2	5	5
(Kazakhstan) Akasheva (Kazakhstan) Kenzhigulov	11	11	11
(South Africa) Cogill (South Africa) Maphanga	6	8	3
(Singapore) Wong (Singapore) Pang	11	11	11
(Argentina) Cifuentes (Argentina) Argüelles	3	7	9
(Serbia) Lupulesku (Serbia) Levajac	3	11	7	10
11	(Brazil) Ishiy (Brazil) Takahashi	11	9	11	12
9	(Romania) Szőcs (Romania) O. Ionescu	11	11	13
(Turkey) Gündüz (Turkey) Altınkaya	6	8	11
(Maldives) Ahmed (Maldives) Nazim
(Japan) Uda (Japan) Kihara	^{w/o}
(Mexico) Madrid (Mexico) Silva	11	11	8	11
(Portugal) Geraldo (Portugal) Shao	5	8	11	8

Second round
8	(South Korea) Shin (South Korea) Lim	11	11	11
(Kazakhstan) Akasheva (Kazakhstan) Kenzhigulov	9	2	8
(Singapore) Wong (Singapore) Pang	11	11	11
11	(Brazil) Ishiy (Brazil) Takahashi	5	7	3
9	(Romania) Szőcs (Romania) O. Ionescu	11	5	9	8
(Japan) Uda (Japan) Kihara	6	11	11	11
(Mexico) Madrid (Mexico) Silva	5	11	3
2	(Japan) Hayata (Japan) Harimoto	11	13	11

Third round
8	(South Korea) Shin (South Korea) Lim	11	11	11
(Singapore) Wong (Singapore) Pang	3	4	9
(Japan) Uda (Japan) Kihara	8	6	8
2	(Japan) Hayata (Japan) Harimoto	11	11	11

Quarterfinals
8	(South Korea) Shin (South Korea) Lim	8	5	6
2	(Japan) Hayata (Japan) Harimoto	11	11	11
