= 2018 Pan American Table Tennis Championships =

Table Tennis tournament

Tournament details
- Dates: 20–25 November 2018
- Edition: 2nd
- Venue: Centro de Entrenamiento Olímpico
- Location: Santiago, Chile

The 2018 Pan American Table Tennis Championships were held in Santiago, Chile from 20 to 25 November 2018.

== Medal summary ==
=== Events ===
Event	Gold	Silver	Bronze
Men's singles	(United States) Kanak Jha	(Argentina) Horacio Cifuentes	(Brazil) Thiago Monteiro
Men's singles	(United States) Kanak Jha	(Argentina) Horacio Cifuentes	(Paraguay) Marcelo Aguirre
Women's singles	(Puerto Rico) Adriana Díaz	(Canada) Zhang Mo	(Brazil) Gui Lin
Women's singles	(Puerto Rico) Adriana Díaz	(Canada) Zhang Mo	(Brazil) Bruna Takahashi
Men's doubles	(Brazil) Vitor Ishiy (Brazil) Eric Jouti	(Paraguay) Marcelo Aguirre (Paraguay) Alejandro Toranzos	(Argentina) Gaston Alto (Argentina) Horacio Cifuentes
Men's doubles	(Brazil) Vitor Ishiy (Brazil) Eric Jouti	(Paraguay) Marcelo Aguirre (Paraguay) Alejandro Toranzos	(Puerto Rico) Brian Afanador (Puerto Rico) Daniel Gonzalez
Women's doubles	(Canada) Alicia Cote (Canada) Zhang Mo	(United States) Wu Yue (United States) Lily Zhang	(Brazil) Gui Lin (Brazil) Jéssica Yamada
Women's doubles	(Canada) Alicia Cote (Canada) Zhang Mo	(United States) Wu Yue (United States) Lily Zhang	(Argentina) Camila Arguelles (Argentina) Ana Codina
Mixed doubles	(Puerto Rico) Brian Afanador (Puerto Rico) Adriana Díaz	(United States) Kanak Jha (United States) Wu Yue	(Canada) Eugene Wang (Canada) Zhang Mo
Mixed doubles	(Puerto Rico) Brian Afanador (Puerto Rico) Adriana Díaz	(United States) Kanak Jha (United States) Wu Yue	(Mexico) Marcos Madrid (Mexico) Yadira Silva
Men's team	Brazil; Humberto Manhani; Eric Jouti; Thiago Monteiro; Vitor Ishiy	United States; Nicholas Tio; Nikhil Kumar; Kanak Jha; Victor Liu	Paraguay; Marcelo Aguirre; Italo Ibañez; Alejandro Toranzos; Gustavo Gomez
Men's team	Brazil; Humberto Manhani; Eric Jouti; Thiago Monteiro; Vitor Ishiy	United States; Nicholas Tio; Nikhil Kumar; Kanak Jha; Victor Liu	Chile; Gustavo Gomez; Juan Lamadrid; Felipe Olivares; Alfonso Olave
Women's team	Brazil; Gui Lin; Jéssica Yamada; Caroline Kumahara; Bruna Takahashi	United States; Wu Yue; Lily Zhang; Wang Xinyue; Angela Guan	Cuba; Idalys Lovet; Lisi Castillo; Daniela Carrazana; Lizdainet Rodríguez
Women's team	Brazil; Gui Lin; Jéssica Yamada; Caroline Kumahara; Bruna Takahashi	United States; Wu Yue; Lily Zhang; Wang Xinyue; Angela Guan	Canada; Zhang Mo; Alicia Cote; Ivy Liao

=== Medal table ===
Rank	Nation	Gold	Silver	Bronze	Total
1	Brazil	3	0	4	7
2	Puerto Rico	2	0	1	3
3	United States	1	4	0	5
4	Canada	1	1	2	4
5	Argentina	0	1	2	3
5	Paraguay	0	1	2	3
7	Chile	0	0	1	1
7	Cuba	0	0	1	1
7	Mexico	0	0	1	1
Totals (9 entries)		7	7	14	28

== Results ==
=== Men's singles ===
==== Finals ====
Semifinals									Final
1	(United States) Kanak Jha	10	11	11	11	8	9	11
8	(Brazil) Thiago Monteiro	12	8	9	7	11	11	6	1	(United States) Kanak Jha	12	13	11	9	11
5	(Argentina) Horacio Cifuentes	11	14	11	6	8	11		5	(Argentina) Horacio Cifuentes	10	11	4	11	8
2	(Paraguay) Marcelo Aguirre	8	12	6	11	11	9

==== Section 1 ====
First Round
(Paraguay) Italo Ibañez	11	11	11	11
(Guatemala) Kevin Montufar	8	5	7	9
(Canada) Eugene Wang	11	11	11	11
(Ecuador) Ian Aulestia	5	1	2	8
(Chile) Alfonso Olave	7	2	8	9
(Brazil) Vitor Ishiy	11	11	11	11
(Argentina) Nicolas Galvano	11	13	13	11	11
(Peru) Diego Rodríguez	4	11	15	7	9
(Uruguay) Santiago Bernardez	1	4	5	3
(Cuba) Jorge Campos	11	11	11	11
(Mexico) Dario Arce	11	11	11	11
(Bolivia) Franco Gareca	4	7	2	2

Second Round
1	(United States) Kanak Jha	11	11	11	11
(Paraguay) Italo Ibañez	5	8	2	7
(Canada) Eugene Wang	11	11	13	8	14
(Brazil) Vitor Ishiy	7	7	11	11	12
(Argentina) Nicolas Galvano	4	11	7	7	11	12
(Cuba) Jorge Campos	11	6	11	11	6	14
(Mexico) Dario Arce	2	6	6	8
6	(Puerto Rico) Brian Afanador	11	11	11	11

Third Round
1	(United States) Kanak Jha	WO
(Canada) Eugene Wang
(Cuba) Jorge Campos	4	11	11	7	3	7
6	(Puerto Rico) Brian Afanador	11	9	7	11	11	11

Quarterfinals
1	(United States) Kanak Jha	11	11	11	10	11
6	(Puerto Rico) Brian Afanador	7	9	8	12	2

==== Section 2 ====
First Round
(United States) Victor Liu	9	5	5	6
(Paraguay) Alejandro Toranzos	11	11	11	11
(Guatemala) Heber Moscoso	3	11	3	5	7
(Canada) Jeremy Hazin	11	7	11	11	11
(Uruguay) Facundo Rodríguez	4	5	7	3
(Chile) Felipe Olivares	11	11	11	11
(Dominican Republic) Emil Santos	11	11	9	11	11
(Peru) Johan Chavez	7	6	11	8	4
(Puerto Rico) Yomar Gonzalez	11	11	8	5	5
(Mexico) Ricardo Villa	13	9	11	11	11
(Argentina) Gaston Alto	11	11	11	11
(Bolivia) Diego Avila	5	3	3	6

Second Round
8	(Brazil) Thiago Monteiro	8	11	11	11	11
(Paraguay) Alejandro Toranzos	11	4	7	7	6
(Canada) Jeremy Hazin	11	11	5	7	6	6
(Chile) Felipe Olivares	7	5	11	11	11	11
(Dominican Republic) Emil Santos	11	11	11	10	7	12
(Mexico) Ricardo Villa	6	8	3	12	11	10
(Argentina) Gaston Alto	10	11	6	11	14	12	6
4	(Ecuador) Alberto Mino	12	7	11	8	16	10	11

Third Round
8	(Brazil) Thiago Monteiro	11	11	11	11
(Chile) Felipe Olivares	9	4	7	8
(Dominican Republic) Emil Santos	4	10	12	7	6
4	(Ecuador) Alberto Mino	11	12	10	11	11

Quarterfinals
8	(Brazil) Thiago Monteiro	11	11	11	11
4	(Ecuador) Alberto Mino	3	8	5	3

==== Section 3 ====
First Round
(Peru) Bryan Blas	4	11	9	7	3
(Cuba) Livan Martinez	11	8	11	11	11
(Mexico) Miguel Lara	8	7	10	6
(United States) Nicholas Tio	11	11	12	11
(Chile) Juan Lamadrid	14	11	11	11	12
(Ecuador) Emiliano Riofrio	16	4	6	3	10
(Bolivia) Fernando Arnez Ortuzte	4	6	8	2
(Dominican Republic) Samuel Galvez	11	11	11	11
(Guatemala) Hector Gatica	11	14	13	11
(Uruguay) Pablo Palou	7	12	11	4

Second Round
3	(Brazil) Eric Jouti	11	11	11	11	11
(Cuba) Livan Martinez	6	6	13	4	9
(United States) Nicholas Tio	11	9	5	7	8
(Puerto Rico) Daniel Gonzalez	9	11	11	11	11
(Chile) Juan Lamadrid	11	11	7	8	14	11
(Dominican Republic) Samuel Galvez	6	7	11	11	12	8
(Guatemala) Hector Gatica	6	7	11	4
5	(Argentina) Horacio Cifuentes	11	11	13	11

Third Round
3	(Brazil) Eric Jouti	11	13	11	11
(Puerto Rico) Daniel Gonzalez	4	11	8	4
(Chile) Juan Lamadrid	9	5	4	8
5	(Argentina) Horacio Cifuentes	11	11	11	11

Quarterfinals
3	(Brazil) Eric Jouti	11	7	7	11	9
5	(Argentina) Horacio Cifuentes	8	11	11	13	11

==== Section 4 ====
First Round
(Ecuador) Pablo Vanegas	9	6	11	7	11	9
(Dominican Republic) Isaac Vila	11	11	6	11	7	11
(Guatemala) Allan Gutierrez	5	12	8	20	11	7	7
(Bolivia) Eduardo Lizarazu	11	10	11	18	7	11	11
(Argentina) Francisco Sanchi	8	4	7	9
(Mexico) Marcos Madrid	11	11	11	11
(Cuba) Andy Pereira	11	13	11	11
(Puerto Rico) Ricardo Jimenez	8	11	2	6
(Brazil) Humberto Manhani	12	8	11	11	11	11
(United States) Nikhil Kumar	10	11	13	2	9	4
(Canada) Marko Medjugorac	11	8	16	11	11
(Peru) Rodrigo Hidalgo	9	11	14	8	7

Second Round
7	(Chile) Gustavo Gomez	11	11	11	12
(Dominican Republic) Isaac Vila	8	8	6	10
(Bolivia) Eduardo Lizarazu	7	7	11	4	3
(Mexico) Marcos Madrid	11	11	6	11	11
(Cuba) Andy Pereira	4	9	11	9	11
(Brazil) Humberto Manhani	11	11	8	11	13
(Canada) Marko Medjugorac	12	11	8	5	8
2	(Paraguay) Marcelo Aguirre	14	9	11	11	11

Third Round
7	(Chile) Gustavo Gomez	6	3	11	9	6
(Mexico) Marcos Madrid	11	11	9	11	11
(Brazil) Humberto Manhani	11	7	7	6	8
2	(Paraguay) Marcelo Aguirre	7	11	11	11	11

Quarterfinals
(Mexico) Marcos Madrid	3	11	11	10	8
2	(Paraguay) Marcelo Aguirre	11	13	2	12	11

=== Women's singles ===
==== Finals ====
Semifinals							Final
1	(Canada) Zhang Mo	12	11	11	11
8	(Brazil) Gui Lin	10	6	5	8		1	(Canada) Zhang Mo	4	8	7	11	7
4	(Brazil) Bruna Takahashi	5	11	8	7	5	2	(Puerto Rico) Adriana Díaz	11	11	11	8	11
2	(Puerto Rico) Adriana Díaz	11	8	11	11	11

==== Section 1 ====
First Round
(Cuba) Daniel Carrazana	7	8	6	5
(United States) Angela Guan	11	11	11	11
(Dominican Republic) Esmerlyn Castro	6	9	12	15	12	8	11
(Ecuador) Astrid Salazar	11	11	10	13	10	11	1
(Puerto Rico) Daniely Ríos	11	11	11	11
(Argentina) Candela Molero	6	5	8	9

Second Round
1	(Canada) Zhang Mo	11	12	11	11
(United States) Angela Guan	5	10	2	6
(Dominican Republic) Esmerlyn Castro	3	6	11	12	11	11
(Brazil) Caroline Kumahara	11	11	8	10	8	9
(Chile) Daniela Ortega	11	6	11	11	11
(Mexico) Monica Muñoz	9	11	8	4	6
(Puerto Rico) Daniely Ríos	11	7	11	9	2	9
6	(Colombia) Paula Medina	9	11	3	11	11	11

Third Round
1	(Canada) Zhang Mo	11	11	11	9	11
(Dominican Republic) Esmerlyn Castro	6	1	3	11	4
(Chile) Daniela Ortega	2	11	11	4	5	3
6	(Colombia) Paula Medina	11	6	4	11	11	11

Quarterfinals
1	(Canada) Zhang Mo	11	11	11	13
6	(Colombia) Paula Medina	7	6	3	11

==== Section 2 ====
First Round
(Canada) Ivy Liao	13	11	11	5	6	10
(Dominican Republic) Eva Brito	11	3	13	11	11	12
(Mexico) Clio Barcenas	9	11	11	7	9	6
(Chile) Judith Morales	11	4	9	11	11	11
(Guatemala) Lucia Cordero	11	0	4	6	6
(Colombia) Cory Tellez	9	11	11	11	11

Second Round
8	(Brazil) Gui Lin	11	11	11	11
(Dominican Republic) Eva Brito	9	3	3	8
(Cuba) Lisi Castillo	6	6	9	5
(Argentina) Ana Codina	11	11	11	11
(Puerto Rico) Melanie Diaz	9	11	11	11	8	11
(Chile) Judith Morales	11	5	6	9	11	8
(Colombia) Cory Tellez	3	9	7	9
3	(United States) Wu Yue	11	11	11	11

Third Round
8	(Brazil) Gui Lin	10	11	11	8	11	11
(Argentina) Ana Codina	12	9	6	11	7	3
(Puerto Rico) Melanie Diaz	8	5	7	7
3	(United States) Wu Yue	11	11	11	11

Quarterfinals
8	(Brazil) Gui Lin	9	8	11	11	11	11
3	(United States) Wu Yue	11	11	3	4	9	3

==== Section 3 ====
First Round
(Puerto Rico) Fabiola Diaz	5	5	5	6
(Cuba) Idalys Lovet	11	11	11	11
(Dominican Republic) Yasiris Ortiz	11	11	11	11
(Colombia) Manuela Echeverry	5	4	6	7
(Ecuador) Emely Quinllin	11	6	4	14	11	11
(Guatemala) Andrea Montufar	8	11	11	16	8	13

Second Round
4	(Brazil) Bruna Takahashi	11	11	11	11
(Cuba) Idalys Lovet	3	4	6	6
(Dominican Republic) Yasiris Ortiz	11	5	5	11	3	9
(United States) Wang Xinyue	8	11	11	9	11	11
(Mexico) Yadira Silva	13	11	8	11	11
(Guatemala) Andrea Montufar	11	5	11	7	6
(Argentina) Agustina Iwasa	7	4	12	11	5
5	(Chile) Paulina Vega	11	11	14	9	11

Third Round
4	(Brazil) Bruna Takahashi	11	11	12	11
(United States) Wang Xinyue	4	7	10	8
(Mexico) Yadira Silva	9	6	5	11	6
5	(Chile) Paulina Vega	11	11	11	6	11

Quarterfinals
4	(Brazil) Bruna Takahashi	11	11	4	11	10	11
5	(Chile) Paulina Vega	8	7	11	3	12	6

==== Section 4 ====
First Round
(Mexico) Marbella Aceves	12	11	9	10	15	10	9
(Chile) Valentina Rios	10	8	11	12	13	12	11
(Colombia) Maria Perdomo	11	8	11	9	12	11
(Cuba) Lizdainet Rodriguez	7	11	4	11	10	4
(Brazil) Jéssica Yamada	8	11	11	8	11	8	11
(Ecuador) Nathaly Paredes	11	2	7	11	2	11	7

Second Round
7	(United States) Lily Zhang	11	11	11	11
(Canada) Alicia Cote	8	7	7	7
(Chile) Valentina Rios	5	10	9	6
(Guatemala) Mabelyn Enriquez	11	12	11	11
(Argentina) Camila Arguelles	11	11	13	11	2	7	11
(Colombia) Maria Perdomo	7	8	15	9	11	11	7
(Brazil) Jéssica Yamada	4	4	11	4
2	(Puerto Rico) Adriana Díaz	11	11	13	11

Third Round
7	(United States) Lily Zhang	11	11	11	11
(Guatemala) Mabelyn Enriquez	8	3	3	9
(Argentina) Camila Arguelles	8	2	4	5
2	(Puerto Rico) Adriana Díaz	11	11	11	11

Quarterfinals
7	(United States) Lily Zhang	9	7	6	8
2	(Puerto Rico) Adriana Díaz	11	11	11	11

=== Men's doubles ===
First Round
(Dominican Republic) Samuel Galvez (Dominican Republic) Emil Santos	6	2	6
(Ecuador) Alberto Mino (Ecuador) Emiliano Riofrio	11	11	11
(Argentina) Gaston Alto (Argentina) Horacio Cifuentes	11	11	5	11
(Bolivia) Franco Gareca (Bolivia) Eduardo Lizarazu	8	4	11	2
(Canada) Jeremy Hazin (Canada) Marko Medjugorac	6	12	12	5	3
3	(United States) Kanak Jha (United States) Victor Liu	11	10	10	11	11
4	(Puerto Rico) Brian Afanador (Puerto Rico) Daniel Gonzalez	11	11	11
(Uruguay) Pablo Palou (Uruguay) Facundo Rodriguez	6	1	4
(Peru) Bryan Blas (Peru) Rodrigo Hidalgo	3	10	11	9
(Mexico) Marcos Madrid (Mexico) Ricardo Villa	11	12	8	11
(Chile) Gustavo Gomez (Chile) Juan Lamadrid	9	11	11	11
(Cuba) Jorge Campos (Cuba) Andy Pereira	11	9	9	9
(Guatemala) Hector Gatica (Guatemala) Heber Moscoso	11	5	8	9
2	(Paraguay) Marcelo Aguirre (Paraguay) Alejandro Toranzos	8	11	11	1

Quarterfinals
1	(Brazil) Vitor Ishiy (Brazil) Eric Jouti	11	11	1
(Ecuador) Alberto Mino (Ecuador) Emiliano Riofrio	8	9	2
(Argentina) Gaston Alto (Argentina) Horacio Cifuentes	4	11	11	12
3	(United States) Kanak Jha (United States) Victor Liu	11	9	9	10
4	(Puerto Rico) Brian Afanador (Puerto Rico) Daniel Gonzalez	8	11	11	11
(Mexico) Marcos Madrid (Mexico) Ricardo Villa	11	7	9	6
(Chile) Gustavo Gomez (Chile) Juan Lamadrid	11	10	15	11	3
2	(Paraguay) Marcelo Aguirre (Paraguay) Alejandro Toranzos	8	12	13	13	11

Semifinals
1	(Brazil) Vitor Ishiy (Brazil) Eric Jouti	11	11	11
(Argentina) Gaston Alto (Argentina) Horacio Cifuentes	9	6	8
4	(Puerto Rico) Brian Afanador (Puerto Rico) Daniel Gonzalez	7	9	7
2	(Paraguay) Marcelo Aguirre (Paraguay) Alejandro Toranzos	11	11	11

Final
1	(Brazil) Vitor Ishiy (Brazil) Eric Jouti	11	12	11
2	(Paraguay) Marcelo Aguirre (Paraguay) Alejandro Toranzos	5	10	6

=== Women's doubles ===
First Round
(Cuba) Lisi Castillo (Cuba) Idalys Lovet	11	7	14	7	11
(Mexico) Marbella Aceves (Mexico) Yadira Silva	6	11	12	11	6
(Brazil) Gui Lin (Brazil) Jéssica Yamada	WO
(Dominican Republic) Eva Brito (Dominican Republic) Yasiris Ortiz
(Guatemala) Lucia Cordero (Guatemala) Andrea Montufar	7	3	8
(Argentina) Camila Arguelles (Argentina) Ana Codina	11	11	11
(Colombia) Paula Medina (Colombia) Maria Perdomo	11	11	11
(Ecuador) Nathaly Medina (Ecuador) Astrid Salazar	3	2	4

Quarterfinals
1	(Canada) Alicia Cote (Canada) Zhang Mo	11	11	11
(Cuba) Lisi Castillo (Cuba) Idalys Lovet	9	6	6
(Brazil) Gui Lin (Brazil) Jéssica Yamada	11	5	11	11
3	(Puerto Rico) Adriana Díaz (Puerto Rico) Melanie Diaz	8	11	8	6
4	(Chile) Judith Morales (Chile) Paulina Vega	11	9	12	2	8
(Argentina) Camila Arguelles (Argentina) Ana Codina	9	11	10	11	11
(Colombia) Paula Medina (Colombia) Maria Perdomo	8	2	6
2	(United States) Wu Yue (United States) Lily Zhang	11	11	11

Semifinals
1	(Canada) Alicia Cote (Canada) Zhang Mo	11	11	11
(Brazil) Gui Lin (Brazil) Jéssica Yamada	4	8	8
(Argentina) Camila Arguelles (Argentina) Ana Codina	7	6	11	3
2	(United States) Wu Yue (United States) Lily Zhang	11	11	7	11

Final
1	(Canada) Alicia Cote (Canada) Zhang Mo	11	11	11	11
2	(United States) Wu Yue (United States) Lily Zhang	13	3	8	7

=== Mixed doubles ===
==== Finals ====
Semifinals						Final
1	(United States) Kanak Jha (United States) Wu Yue	11	8	11	11
8	(Mexico) Marcos Madrid (Mexico) Yadira Silva	6	11	5	7	1	(United States) Kanak Jha (United States) Wu Yue	5	11	8	3
3	(Canada) Eugene Wang (Canada) Zhang Mo	14	8	7		2	(Puerto Rico) Brian Afanador (Puerto Rico) Adriana Díaz	11	9	11	11
2	(Puerto Rico) Brian Afanador (Puerto Rico) Adriana Díaz	16	11	11

==== Top Draw ====
First Round
(Canada) Marko Medjugorac (Canada) Alicia Cote	6	11	11	8	11
(Ecuador) Alberto Mino (Ecuador) Nathaly Paredes	11	7	6	4	4
(Argentina) Gaston Alto (Argentina) Ana Codina	9	11	11	11
(Guatemala) Kevin Montufar (Guatemala) Lucia Cordero	11	8	1	9
(Dominican Republic) Samuel Galvez (Dominican Republic) Yasiris Ortiz
(Puerto Rico) Daniel Gonzalez (Puerto Rico) Melanie Diaz	WO

Second Round
1	(United States) Kanak Jha (United States) Wu Yue	11	7	11	11
(Canada) Marko Medjugorac (Canada) Alicia Cote	3	11	9	4
(Argentina) Gaston Alto (Argentina) Ana Codina	11	11	5	11
7	(Chile) Juan Lamadrid (Chile) Paulina Vega	5	7	11	9
8	(Mexico) Marcos Madrid (Mexico) Yadira Silva	5	11	5	11	11
(Puerto Rico) Daniel Gonzalez (Puerto Rico) Melanie Diaz	11	6	11	4	5
(Cuba) Andy Pereira (Cuba) Idalys Lovet	3	4	11
4	(Brazil) Vitor Ishiy (Brazil) Bruna Takahashi	11	11	13

Quarterfinals
1	(United States) Kanak Jha (United States) Wu Yue	13	13	11	11
7	(Argentina) Gaston Alto (Argentina) Ana Codina	15	11	8	7
8	(Mexico) Marcos Madrid (Mexico) Yadira Silva	11	9	11	11
4	(Brazil) Vitor Ishiy (Brazil) Bruna Takahashi	3	11	8	4

Semifinals
1	(United States) Kanak Jha (United States) Wu Yue	11	8	11	11
8	(Mexico) Marcos Madrid (Mexico) Yadira Silva	6	11	5	7

==== Bottom Draw ====
First Round
(Ecuador) Emiliano Riofrio (Ecuador) Astrid Salazar	8	9	8
(United States) Nikhil Kumar (United States) Lily Zhang	11	11	11
(Mexico) Ricardo Villa (Mexico) Marbella Aceves	11	6	11	5	6
(Guatemala) Hector Gatica (Guatemala) Mabelyn Enriquez	6	11	9	11	11
(Chile) Gustavo Gomez (Chile) Judith Morales	6	11	14	15
(Cuba) Jorge Campos (Cuba) Lisi Castillo	11	4	12	13

Second Round
3	(Canada) Eugene Wang (Canada) Zhang Mo	11	11	11
(United States) Nikhil Kumar (United States) Lily Zhang	9	8	4
(Dominican Republic) Emil Santos (Dominican Republic) Eva Brito	9	5	1
6	(Argentina) Horacio Cifuentes (Argentina) Camila Arguelles	11	11	11
5	(Brazil) Eric Jouti (Brazil) Gui Lin	11	11	11
(Guatemala) Hector Gatica (Guatemala) Mabelyn Enriquez	7	9	9
(Chile) Gustavo Gomez (Chile) Judith Morales	8	10	11
2	(Puerto Rico) Brian Afanador (Puerto Rico) Adriana Díaz	11	12	13

Quarterfinals
3	(Canada) Eugene Wang (Canada) Zhang Mo	11	11	11
6	(Argentina) Horacio Cifuentes (Argentina) Camila Arguelles	5	2	4
5	(Brazil) Eric Jouti (Brazil) Gui Lin	9	11	8	12	8
2	(Puerto Rico) Brian Afanador (Puerto Rico) Adriana Díaz	11	9	11	10	11

Semifinals
3	(Canada) Eugene Wang (Canada) Zhang Mo	14	8	7
2	(Puerto Rico) Brian Afanador (Puerto Rico) Adriana Díaz	16	11	11

== See also ==
- 2018 ITTF Pan-America Cup
