= Table tennis at the 2020 Summer Olympics – Men's team =

Table tennis – men's team at the Games of the XXXII Olympiad
- Venue: Tokyo Metropolitan Gymnasium
- Date: 1–6 August 2021
- Competitors: 48 from 16 nations
- Teams: 16

Medalists
1st place, gold medalist(s)		Fan Zhendong; Ma Long; Xu Xin	China
2nd place, silver medalist(s)		Dimitrij Ovtcharov; Patrick Franziska; Timo Boll	Germany
3rd place, bronze medalist(s)		Jun Mizutani; Koki Niwa; Tomokazu Harimoto	Japan

The men's team table tennis event was part of the table tennis programme at the 2020 Summer Olympics in Tokyo. The event took place from 1 August to 6 August 2021 at Tokyo Metropolitan Gymnasium.

== Format ==
Teams were made up of three players. Each team match was made up of five individual matches and ended when either side has won three matches. The order of a team match was changed as follows: a doubles match, two singles matches, and if neither side had won three matches by this point, a maximum of two extra singles matches were played. The new order avoids any players playing two matches in succession, and forces players who play two singles to compete in the second individual match.

Order of a team match
		ABC team	vs	XYZ team
1	Doubles	B + C	vs	Y + Z
2	Singles	A	vs	X
3	Singles	C	vs	Z
4	Singles	A	vs	Y
5	Singles	B	vs	X

== Schedule ==
Legend
P	Preliminary round	¼	Quarter-finals	½	Semi-finals	F	Final

Sun 1	Mon 2		Tue 3	Wed 4	Thu 5	Fri 6
P	P	¼	¼	½		F

== Seeds ==
The men’s team Olympic qualification rankings published in July 2021 was used for seeding purposes. The results of the draw are announced on 21 July at the Tokyo Metropolitan Gymnasium. Each team is eligible to nominate one reserve player to the Tokyo Games to replace a team member who is injured or has an illness.

Rank	Team	Athletes (world ranking in July 2021)			Reserve
1	China	Fan Zhendong (1)	Xu Xin (2)	Ma Long (3)	Wang Chuqin (14)
2	Germany	Dimitrij Ovtcharov (10)	Timo Boll (11)	Patrick Franziska (17)	Benedikt Duda (44)
3	Japan	Tomokazu Harimoto (4)	Koki Niwa (16)	Jun Mizutani (18)	Yukiya Uda (37)
4	South Korea	Jang Woo-jin (12)	Jeoung Young-sik (13)	Lee Sang-su (22)	An Jae-hyun (36)
5	Sweden	Mattias Falck (8)	Kristian Karlsson (33)	Anton Källberg (43)	Jon Persson (42)
6	Brazil	Hugo Calderano (6)	Gustavo Tsuboi (38)	Vitor Ishiy (58)	Eric Jouti (87)
7	Chinese Taipei	Lin Yun-ju (7)	Chuang Chih-yuan (28)	Chen Chien-an (67)	Liao Cheng-ting (121)
8	France	Simon Gauzy (20)	Emmanuel Lebesson (40)	Alexandre Cassin (134)	
9	Portugal	Marcos Freitas (24)	Tiago Apolónia (57)	João Monteiro (70)	João Geraldo (92)
10	Croatia	Tomislav Pucar (34)	Andrej Gaćina (49)	Frane Tomislav Kojić (89)	Filip Zeljko (233)
11	Hong Kong	Wong Chun Ting (19)	Lam Siu Hang (94)	Ho Kwan Kit (102)	Ng Pak Nam (190)
12	Slovenia	Darko Jorgić (26)	Bojan Tokič (63)	Deni Kožul (114)	Peter Hribar (300)
13	Egypt	Omar Assar (41)	Ahmed Saleh (46)	Khalid Assar (126)	Mohamed El-Beiali (173)
14	United States	Kanak Jha (30)	Nikhil Kumar (178)	Xin Zhou (974)	Feng Yijun (580)
15	Serbia	Žolt Peto (153)	Marko Jevtović (218)	Dimitrije Levajac (383)	
16	Australia	Hu Heming (131)	Chris Yan (221)	David Powell (250)	

== Bracket ==
First round
1	China	3
13	Egypt	0
11	Hong Kong	0
8	France	3
6	Brazil	3
15	Serbia	2
12	Slovenia	1
4	South Korea	3
3	Japan	3
16	Australia	0
14	United States	1
5	Sweden	3
7	Chinese Taipei	3
10	Croatia	0
9	Portugal	0
2	Germany	3

Quarterfinals
1	China	3
8	France	0
6	Brazil	0
4	South Korea	3
3	Japan	3
5	Sweden	1
7	Chinese Taipei	2
2	Germany	3

Semifinals
1	China	3
4	South Korea	0
3	Japan	2
2	Germany	3

Gold medal match
1	China	3
2	Germany	0
Bronze medal match
4	South Korea	1
3	Japan	3

== Results ==
=== First round ===
1 August; 19:30	China	3–0	Egypt	Duration: 1h 12min

	Individual matches
Ma Long / Xu Xin	3–0	Ahmed Saleh / Khalid Assar	11–4, 11–7, 11–3
Fan Zhendong	3–0	Omar Assar	11–4, 11–8, 11–5
Xu Xin	3–0	Khalid Assar	11–9, 11–7, 11–2

1 August; 14:30	Hong Kong	0–3	France	Duration: 1h 36min

	Individual matches
Lam Siu-hang / Ho Kwan-kit	0–3	Alexandre Cassin / Emmanuel Lebesson	10–12, 8–11, 6–11
Wong Chun-ting	1–3	Simon Gauzy	5–11, 11–7, 12–14, 9–11
Ho Kwan-kit	0–3	Emmanuel Lebesson	10–12, 5–11, 4–11

1 August; 14:30	Brazil	3–2	Serbia	Duration: 3h 57min

	Individual matches
Vitor Ishiy / Gustavo Tsuboi	1–3	Zsolt Peto / Marko Jevtović	7–11, 9–11, 11–8, 8–11
Hugo Calderano	3–2	Dimitrije Levajac	11–8, 11–13, 11–5, 10–12, 11–5
Gustavo Tsuboi	2–3	Marko Jevtović	11–8, 11–8, 8–11, 6–11, 13–15
Hugo Calderano	3–2	Zsolt Peto	11–9, 11–4, 9–11, 9–11, 11–8
Vitor Ishiy	3–0	Dimitrije Levajac	11–6, 11–6, 14–12

1 August; 10:00	Slovenia	1–3	South Korea	Duration: 2h 38min

	Individual matches
Deni Kožul / Bojan Tokić	0–3	Lee Sang-su / Jeoung Young-sik	8–11, 8–11, 6–11
Darko Jorgić	2–3	Jang Woo-jin	11–7, 9–11, 8–11, 11–9, 5–11
Bojan Tokić	3–1	Jeoung Young-sik	9–11, 11–5, 11–5, 12–10
Deni Kožul	1–3	Jang Woo-jin	6–11, 12–10, 9–11, 8–11

2 August; 10:30	Japan	3–0	Australia	Duration: 1h 5min

	Individual matches
Koki Niwa / Jun Mizutani	3–0	Hu Heming / Chris Yan	11–7, 11–3, 11–8
Tomokazu Harimoto	3–0	David Powell	11–4, 11–9, 11–7
Jun Mizutani	3–0	Chris Yan	11–4, 11–1, 11–9

2 August; 10:30	United States	1–3	Sweden	Duration: 2h 5min

	Individual matches
Nikhil Kumar / Xin Zhou	0–3	Kristian Karlsson / Anton Källberg	6–11, 5–11, 5–11
Kanak Jha	3–1	Mattias Falck	9–11, 11–8, 11–9, 14–12
Xin Zhou	0–3	Anton Källberg	7–11, 8–11, 8–11
Kanak Jha	0–3	Kristian Karlsson	10–12, 5–11, 6–11

1 August; 10:00	Chinese Taipei	3–0	Croatia	Duration: 1h 50min

	Individual matches
Chen Chien-an / Chuang Chih-yuan	3–2	Frane Tomislav Kojić / Andrej Gaćina	11–9, 6–11, 11–7, 14–16, 11–5
Lin Yun-ju	3–0	Tomislav Pucar	11–7, 11–6, 11–8
Chuang Chih-yuan	3–0	Andrej Gaćina	12–10, 11–3, 16–14

1 August; 19:30	Portugal	0–3	Germany	Duration: 1h 34min

	Individual matches
João Monteiro / Tiago Apolónia	0–3	Patrick Franziska / Timo Boll	15–17, 4–11, 9–11
Marcos Freitas	0–3	Dimitrij Ovtcharov	9–11, 7–11, 6–11
Tiago Apolónia	0–3	Timo Boll	3–11, 9–11, 8–11

=== Quarterfinals ===
2 August; 19:30	China	3–0	France	Duration: 1h 54min

	Individual matches
Ma Long / Xu Xin	3–0	Alexandre Cassin / Emmanuel Lebesson	11–6, 11–5, 11–7
Fan Zhendong	3–2	Simon Gauzy	10–12, 12–10, 8–11, 11–5, 11–7
Xu Xin	3–0	Emmanuel Lebesson	11–8, 11–5, 11–6

2 August; 14:30	Brazil	0–3	South Korea	Duration: 2h 3min

	Individual matches
Vitor Ishiy / Gustavo Tsuboi	0–3	Lee Sang-su / Jeoung Young-sik	6–11, 2–11, 10–12
Hugo Calderano	0–3	Jang Woo-jin	6–11, 8–11, 10–12
Gustavo Tsuboi	2–3	Jeoung Young-sik	6–11, 11–8, 4–11, 11–8, 7–11

3 August; 10:00	Japan	3–1	Sweden	Duration: 2h 34min

	Individual matches
Koki Niwa / Tomokazu Harimoto	3–1	Kristian Karlsson / Anton Källberg	11–8, 13–11, 8–11, 11–9
Jun Mizutani	1–3	Mattias Falck	3–11, 9–11, 12–10, 8–11
Tomokazu Harimoto	3–1	Anton Källberg	10–12, 11–9, 11–9, 12–10
Koki Niwa	3–0	Mattias Falck	12–10, 11–5, 11–6

3 August; 14:30	Chinese Taipei	2–3	Germany	Duration: 3h

	Individual matches
Chuang Chih-yuan / Chen Chien-an	1–3	Patrick Franziska / Timo Boll	0–11, 11–6, 6–11, 10–12
Lin Yun-ju	3–2	Dimitrij Ovtcharov	10–12, 14–12, 11–7, 12–14, 11–7
Chen Chien-an	0–3	Timo Boll	4–11, 4–11, 6–11
Lin Yun-ju	3–0	Patrick Franziska	11–9, 13–11, 11–6
Chuang Chih-yuan	0–3	Dimitrij Ovtcharov	8–11, 9–11, 7–11

=== Semifinals ===
4 August; 14:30	China	3–0	South Korea	Duration: 2h 12min

	Individual matches
Xu Xin / Ma Long	3–0	Jeoung Young-sik / Lee Sang-su	11–5, 11–5, 11–8
Fan Zhendong	3–0	Jang Woo-jin	11–7, 11–9, 16–14
Ma Long	3–2	Lee Sang-su	11–9, 11–8, 9–11, 13–15, 11–6

4 August; 19:30	Japan	2–3	Germany	Duration: 3h 28min

	Individual matches
Koki Niwa / Jun Mizutani	2–3	Patrick Franziska / Timo Boll	2–11, 3–11, 11–9, 11–8, 7–11
Tomokazu Harimoto	3–1	Dimitrij Ovtcharov	7–11, 13–11, 11–5, 11–9
Jun Mizutani	1–3	Timo Boll	11–7, 11–13, 7–11, 7–11
Tomokazu Harimoto	3–2	Patrick Franziska	5–11, 9–11, 11–5, 11–9, 11–9
Koki Niwa	0–3	Dimitrij Ovtcharov	9–11, 7–11, 8–11

=== Bronze medal match ===
6 August; 11:00	South Korea	1–3	Japan	Duration: 2h 35min

	Individual matches
Lee Sang-su / Jeoung Young-sik	1–3	Jun Mizutani / Koki Niwa	9–11, 11–8, 13–15, 5–11
Jang Woo-jin	1–3	Tomokazu Harimoto	7–11, 11–8, 10–12, 7–11
Jeoung Young-sik	3–0	Koki Niwa	11–3, 11–8, 11–7
Jang Woo-jin	0–3	Jun Mizutani	12–14, 9–11, 8–11

=== Gold medal match ===
6 August; 19:30	China	3–0	Germany	Duration: 2h 3min

	Individual matches
Xu Xin / Ma Long	3–0	Patrick Franziska / Timo Boll	11–7, 11–3, 11–9
Fan Zhendong	3–2	Dimitrij Ovtcharov	3–11, 11–6, 9–11, 11–5, 11–3
Ma Long	3–1	Timo Boll	11–5, 11–9, 11–13, 11–7
