= Table tennis at the 2023 Pan American Games – Mixed doubles =

Mixed doubles at the 2023 Pan American Games
- Venue: Olympic Training Center
- Dates: 29–30 October 2023
- Competitors: 34 from 17 nations

Medalists
Gold medal	Jorge Campos; Daniela Fonseca	Cuba
Silver medal	Vitor Ishiy; Bruna Takahashi	Brazil
Bronze medal	Eugene Wang; Mo Zhang	Canada
Bronze medal	Nicolás Burgos; Paulina Vega	Chile

The mixed doubles competition of the table tennis events at the 2023 Pan American Games was held on 29 and 30 October 2023 at the Olympic Training Center in Santiago, Chile.

== Schedule ==
Date	Time	Round
29 October 2023	10:00	Round of 32
29 October 2023	10:00	Round of 16
29 October 2023	17:30	Quarterfinals
30 October 2023	10:00	Semifinals
30 October 2023	19:40	Final

== Results ==
The results during the elimination rounds and final rounds were as follows:

Round of 32
Mabelyn Enriquez (EAI); Héctor Gatica (EAI)	11	11	11	7	11
Chelsea Edghill (GUY); Shemar Britton (GUY)	8	7	8	11	8

Round of 16
Vitor Ishiy (BRA); Bruna Takahashi (BRA)	11	11	11	13
Roxy González (VEN); César Castillo (VEN)	5	8	3	11
Jiaji Wu (DOM); Yasiris Ortiz (DOM)	6	10	9	3
Lily Zhang (USA); Jishan Liang (USA)	11	12	11	11
Eugene Wang (CAN); Mo Zhang (CAN)	11	11	11	11
Lucero Ovelar (PAR); Marcelo Aguirre (PAR)	7	7	3	4
Diego Orantes (ESA); Gabriela Suarez (ESA)	6	9	7	11	7
Yadira Silva (MEX); Marcos Madrid (MEX)	11	11	11	6	11
Horacio Cifuentes (ARG); Camila Argüelles (ARG)	11	11	11	11
Santiago Montes (COL); María Perdomo (COL)	7	5	6	4
Mabelyn Enriquez (EAI); Héctor Gatica (EAI)	5	4	1	6
Jorge Campos (CUB); Daniela Fonseca (CUB)	11	11	11	11
Adriana Díaz (PUR); Brian Afanador (PUR)	11	11	11	11
Felipe Duffoo (PER); Isabel Duffoo (PER)	8	5	7	8
Nathaly Paredes (ECU); Alberto Miño (ECU)	6	6	6	9
Nicolás Burgos (CHI); Paulina Vega (CHI)	11	11	11	11

Quarterfinals
Vitor Ishiy (BRA); Bruna Takahashi (BRA)	10	11	11	11	11
Lily Zhang (USA); Jishan Liang (USA)	12	4	8	9	7
Eugene Wang (CAN); Mo Zhang (CAN)	11	8	12	7	11	9	11
Yadira Silva (MEX); Marcos Madrid (MEX)	5	11	10	11	5	11	8
Horacio Cifuentes (ARG); Camila Argüelles (ARG)	12	11	12	8	10	11	12
Jorge Campos (CUB); Daniela Fonseca (CUB)	10	13	10	11	12	8	14
Adriana Díaz (PUR); Brian Afanador (PUR)	7	11	6	9	11	8
Nicolás Burgos (CHI); Paulina Vega (CHI)	11	4	11	11	7	11

Semifinals
Vitor Ishiy (BRA); Bruna Takahashi (BRA)	11	11	10	'11	6	'11
Eugene Wang (CAN); Mo Zhang (CAN)	9	5	12	4	11	8
Jorge Campos (CUB); Daniela Fonseca (CUB)	11	7	11	11	11	11	11
Nicolás Burgos (CHI); Paulina Vega (CHI)	6	11	13	4	13	9	5

Final
Vitor Ishiy (BRA); Bruna Takahashi (BRA)	8	6	7	7
Jorge Campos (CUB); Daniela Fonseca (CUB)	11	11	11	11
