= Table tennis at the 2023 Pan American Games – Men's doubles =

Men's doubles at the 2023 Pan American Games
- Venue: Olympic Training Center
- Dates: 29 October and 31 October
- Competitors: 20 from 10 nations

Medalists
Gold medal	Jorge Campos; Andy Pereira	Cuba
Silver medal	Vitor Ishiy; Hugo Calderano	Brazil
Bronze medal	Gastón Alto; Horacio Cifuentes	Argentina
Bronze medal	Nicolás Burgos; Gustavo Gómez	Chile

The men's doubles competition of the table tennis events at the 2023 Pan American Games was held on 29 and 31 October 2023 at the Olympic Training Center in Santiago, Chile.

== Schedule ==
Date	Time	Round
29 October 2023	16:00	Round of 16
29 October 2023	19:45	Quarterfinals
31 October 2023	14:10	Semifinals
31 October 2023	20:30	Final

== Results ==
The results during the elimination rounds and final rounds were as follows:

Round of 16
Héctor Gatica (EAI); Heber Moscoso (EAI)	4	5	7	7
Alberto Miño (ECU); Emiliano Riofrio (ECU)	11	11	11	11
Jishan Liang (USA); Nandan Naresh (USA)	5	9	7	8
Jorge Campos (CUB); Andy Pereira (CUB)	11	11	11	11
Marcos Madrid (MEX); Rogelio Castro (MEX)	7	7	8	4
Vitor Ishiy (BRA); Hugo Calderano (BRA)	11	11	11	11
Siméon Martin (CAN); Edward Ly (CAN)	9	11	8	12	11	11
Marcelo Aguirre (PAR); Alejandro Toranzos (PAR)	11	3	11	10	9	7
Carlos Fernández (PER); Rodrigo Hidalgo (PER)	11	13	11	12
Santiago Montes (COL); Julián Ramos (COL)	9	11	7	10

Quarterfinals
Gastón Alto (ARG); Horacio Cifuentes (ARG)	7	8	11	11	11	11
Alberto Miño (ECU); Emiliano Riofrio (ECU)	11	11	6	9	5	8
Jorge Campos (CUB); Andy Pereira (CUB)	11	11	11	5	11
Brian Afanador (PUR); Daniel González (PUR)	4	9	6	11	4
Vitor Ishiy (BRA); Hugo Calderano (BRA)	11	11	4	6	11	11
Siméon Martin (CAN); Edward Ly (CAN)	6	4	11	11	4	4
Carlos Fernandez (PER); Rodrigo Hidalgo (PER)	7	9	9	5
Nicolás Burgos (CHI); Gustavo Gómez (CHI)	11	11	11	11

Semifinals
Gastón Alto (ARG); Horacio Cifuentes (ARG)	7	6	11	11	9	3
Jorge Campos (CUB); Andy Pereira (CUB)	11	11	3	8	11	11
Vitor Ishiy (BRA); Hugo Calderano (BRA)	11	14	11	11	9	13
Nicolás Burgos (CHI); Gustavo Gómez (CHI)	5	16	5	6	11	11

Final
Jorge Campos (CUB); Andy Pereira (CUB)	5	11	11	12	8	11
Vitor Ishiy (BRA); Hugo Calderano (BRA)	11	8	8	10	11	7
