= Table tennis at the 2023 Pan American Games – Men's team =

Men's team at the 2023 Pan American Games
- Venue: Olympic Training Center
- Dates: November 2 - November 5
- Competitors: 36 from 12 nations

Medalists
Gold medal	Eric Jouti; Hugo Calderano; Vitor Ishiy	Brazil
Silver medal	Siméon Martin; Edward Ly; Eugene Wang	Canada
Bronze medal	Horacio Cifuentes; Santiago Lorenzo; Gastón Alto	Argentina
Bronze medal	Jishan Liang; Nandan Naresh; Siddhartha Naresh	United States

The men's team competition of the table tennis events at the 2023 Pan American Games was held from November 2 to 5 at the Olympic Training Center in Santiago, Chile.

== Schedule ==
Date	Time	Round
November 2–3, 2023	12:30	Round Robin
November 3, 2023	19:30	Quarterfinals
November 4, 2023	16:00	Semifinals
November 5, 2023	13:00	Final

== Results ==
=== Round Robin ===
The round robin was used as a qualification round. The twelve teams were split into groups of three. The top two teams from each group advanced to the first round of playoffs.

==== Group A ====
Nation	Pld	W	L	GF	GA
Brazil	2	2	0	6	2
Ecuador	2	1	1	5	5
Paraguay	2	0	2	2	6

November 2; 12:30	Report	Paraguay	0–3	Brazil	Table 1

November 2; 19:30	Report	Brazil	3–2	Ecuador	Table 3

November 3; 12:30	Report	Ecuador	3–2	Paraguay	Table 2

==== Group B ====
Nation	Pld	W	L	GF	GA
United States	2	2	0	6	4
Cuba	2	1	1	5	5
Mexico	2	0	2	4	6

November 2; 12:30	Report	Mexico	2–3	United States	Table 3

November 2; 19:30	Report	United States	3–2	Cuba	Table 2

November 3; 12:30	Report	Mexico	2–3	Cuba	Table 4

==== Group C ====
Nation	Pld	W	L	GF	GA
Canada	2	2	0	6	2
Puerto Rico	2	1	1	5	3
Independent Athletes Team	2	0	2	0	6

November 2; 12:30	Report	Puerto Rico	3–0	Independent Athletes Team	Table 2

November 2; 19:30	Report	Puerto Rico	2–3	Canada	Table 4

November 3; 12:30	Report	Canada	3–0	Independent Athletes Team	Table 3

==== Group D ====
Nation	Pld	W	L	GF	GA
Argentina	2	2	0	6	1
Peru	2	1	1	4	5
Chile	2	0	2	2	6

November 2; 12:30	Report	Argentina	3–1	Peru	Table 4

November 2; 19:30	Report	Argentina	3–0	Chile	Table 1

November 3; 12:30	Report	Peru	3–2	Chile	Table 1

=== Playoffs ===
The results were as follows:

Quarterfinals
Puerto Rico	0	0	2
Brazil	3	3	3
Cuba	3	2	2	2
Argentina	2	3	3	3
Canada	3	3	3
Ecuador	0	0	0
United States	2	3	3	3
Peru	3	2	1	2

Semifinals
Argentina	3	0	3	2	1
Brazil	0	3	0	3	3
Canada	3	3	1	1	3
United States	0	1	3	3	1

Final
Brazil	3	3	0	3
Canada	0	1	3	0

== Final classification ==
Rank	Team	Athlete
1st place, gold medalist(s)	Brazil	Eric Jouti; Hugo Calderano; Vitor Ishiy
2nd place, silver medalist(s)	Canada	Siméon Martin; Edward Ly; Eugene Wang
3rd place, bronze medalist(s)	Argentina	Horacio Cifuentes; Santiago Lorenzo; Gastón Alto
3rd place, bronze medalist(s)	United States	Jishan Liang; Nandan Naresh; Siddhartha Naresh
5	Puerto Rico	Daniel González; Brian Afanador; Angel Naranjo
5	Ecuador	Alberto Miño; Rodrigo Tapia; Emiliano Riofrio
5	Peru	Felipe Duffoo; Rodrigo Hidalgo; Carlos Fernandez
5	Cuba	Jorge Campos; Andy Pereira; Adrian Pérez
9	Chile	Gustavo Gómez; Alfonso Olave; Nicolás Burgos
9	Independent Athletes Team	Heber Moscoso; Héctor Gatica; Sergio Carrillo
9	Mexico	Rogelio Castro; Marcos Madrid; José Villa
9	Paraguay	Alejandro Toranzos; Axel Bertolo; Marcelo Aguirre
