= 2019 Pan American Table Tennis Championships =

Table Tennis tournament

Tournament details
- Dates: 3–8 September 2019
- Edition: 3rd
- Venue: SND Arena
- Location: Asunción, Paraguay

Champions
- Men's singles: (Brazil) Vitor Ishiy
- Women's singles: (United States) Lily Zhang
- Men's doubles: (Argentina) Gastón Alto (Argentina) Horacio Cifuentes
- Women's doubles: (United States) Jennifer Wu (United States) Lily Zhang
- Mixed doubles: (United States) Kai Zhang (United States) Lily Zhang

The 2019 Pan American Table Tennis Championships were held in Asunción, Paraguay from 3 to 8 September 2019.

== Medal summary ==
=== Events ===
Event	Gold	Silver	Bronze
Men's singles	(Brazil) Vitor Ishiy	(Argentina) Gastón Alto	(Brazil) Gustavo Tsuboi
Men's singles	(Brazil) Vitor Ishiy	(Argentina) Gastón Alto	(United States) Kanak Jha
Women's singles	(United States) Lily Zhang	(Brazil) Bruna Takahashi	(Canada) Zhang Mo
Women's singles	(United States) Lily Zhang	(Brazil) Bruna Takahashi	(United States) Jennifer Wu
Men's doubles	(Argentina) Gastón Alto (Argentina) Horacio Cifuentes	(Brazil) Eric Jouti (Brazil) Gustavo Tsuboi	(Chile) Gustavo Gómez (Chile) Juan Lamadrid
Men's doubles	(Argentina) Gastón Alto (Argentina) Horacio Cifuentes	(Brazil) Eric Jouti (Brazil) Gustavo Tsuboi	(Mexico) Marcos Madrid (Mexico) Ricardo Villa
Women's doubles	(United States) Jennifer Wu (United States) Lily Zhang	(Chile) Daniela Ortega (Chile) Paulina Vega	(Canada) Xu Joyce (Canada) Zhang Mo
Women's doubles	(United States) Jennifer Wu (United States) Lily Zhang	(Chile) Daniela Ortega (Chile) Paulina Vega	(Puerto Rico) Melanie Díaz (Puerto Rico) Daniely Ríos
Mixed doubles	(United States) Kai Zhang (United States) Lily Zhang	(United States) Nikhil Kumar (United States) Amy Wang	(Argentina) Horacio Cifuentes (Argentina) Camila Argüelles
Mixed doubles	(United States) Kai Zhang (United States) Lily Zhang	(United States) Nikhil Kumar (United States) Amy Wang	(Puerto Rico) Daniel González (Puerto Rico) Melanie Díaz
Men's team	Brazil; Gustavo Tsuboi; Eric Jouti; Vitor Ishiy; Thiago Monteiro	Puerto Rico; Brian Afanador; Daniel González; Ángel Naranjo	Canada; Jeremy Hazin; Edward Ly; Marko Medjugorac; Terence Yeung
Men's team	Brazil; Gustavo Tsuboi; Eric Jouti; Vitor Ishiy; Thiago Monteiro	Puerto Rico; Brian Afanador; Daniel González; Ángel Naranjo	United States; Kanak Jha; Nikhil Kumar; Kai Zhang; Nicholas Tio
Women's team	United States; Lily Zhang; Jennifer Wu; Crystal Wang; Amy Wang	Brazil; Bruna Takahashi; Jéssica Yamada; Caroline Kumahara; Bruna Alexandre	Chile; Paulina Vega; Daniela Ortega; Judith Morales; Valentina Ríos
Women's team	United States; Lily Zhang; Jennifer Wu; Crystal Wang; Amy Wang	Brazil; Bruna Takahashi; Jéssica Yamada; Caroline Kumahara; Bruna Alexandre	Puerto Rico; Adriana Díaz; Melanie Díaz; Daniely Ríos

=== Medal table ===
Rank	Nation	Gold	Silver	Bronze	Total
1	United States	4	1	3	8
2	Brazil	2	3	1	6
3	Argentina	1	1	1	3
4	Puerto Rico	0	1	3	4
5	Chile	0	1	2	3
6	Canada	0	0	3	3
7	Mexico	0	0	1	1
Totals (7 entries)		7	7	14	28

== See also ==
- 2019 ITTF Pan-America Cup
