= 2017 Pan American Table Tennis Championships =

Table Tennis tournament

The 2017 Pan American Table Tennis Championships is the first edition of the championships, and were held in Cartagena de Indias, Colombia from September 11 to September 17, 2017.

== Medal summary ==
=== Events ===
Event	Gold	Silver	Bronze
Men's singles	(Brazil) Hugo Calderano	(Brazil) Thiago Monteiro	(Argentina) Horacio Cifuentes
Men's singles	(Brazil) Hugo Calderano	(Brazil) Thiago Monteiro	(Mexico) Marcos Madrid
Women's singles	(Puerto Rico) Adriana Diaz	(United States) Wu Yue	(Brazil) Bruna Takahashi
Women's singles	(Puerto Rico) Adriana Diaz	(United States) Wu Yue	(United States) Crystal Wang
Men's doubles	(Brazil) Vitor Ishiy (Brazil) Eric Jouti	(Cuba) Jorge Pereira (Cuba) Andy Pereira	(Ecuador) Alberto Mino (Ecuador) Emiliano Riofrio
Men's doubles	(Brazil) Vitor Ishiy (Brazil) Eric Jouti	(Cuba) Jorge Pereira (Cuba) Andy Pereira	(Paraguay) Marcelo Aguirre (Paraguay) Axel Gavilan
Women's doubles	(Canada) Alicia Cote (Canada) Zhang Mo	(United States) Crystal Wang (United States) Wu Yue	(Brazil) Gui Lin (Brazil) Bruna Takahashi
Women's doubles	(Canada) Alicia Cote (Canada) Zhang Mo	(United States) Crystal Wang (United States) Wu Yue	(Cuba) Lisi Castillo (Cuba) Idalys Lovet
Mixed doubles	(Brazil) Vitor Ishiy (Brazil) Bruna Takahashi	(Brazil) Eric Jouti (Brazil) Gui Lin	(Argentina) Gaston Alto (Argentina) Ana Codina
Mixed doubles	(Brazil) Vitor Ishiy (Brazil) Bruna Takahashi	(Brazil) Eric Jouti (Brazil) Gui Lin	(Canada) Marko Medjugorac (Canada) Zhang Mo
Men's team	Brazil; Hugo Calderano; Vitor Ishiy; Eric Jouti; Thiago Monteiro	Argentina; Gaston Alto; Martin Betancor; Horacio Cifuentes; Pablo Tabachnik	Paraguay; Marcelo Aguirre; Axel Gavilan; Benicio Moreno; Alejandro Toranzos
Men's team	Brazil; Hugo Calderano; Vitor Ishiy; Eric Jouti; Thiago Monteiro	Argentina; Gaston Alto; Martin Betancor; Horacio Cifuentes; Pablo Tabachnik	United States; Adar Alguetti; Sharon Alguetti; Kunal Chodri; Nicholas Tio
Women's team	Brazil; Bruna Alexandre; Gui Lin; Bruna Takahashi	United States; Wu Yue; Crystal Wang; Grace Yang; Rachel Yang	Argentina; Camila Arguelles; Ana Codina; Agustina Iwasa; Candela Molero
Women's team	Brazil; Bruna Alexandre; Gui Lin; Bruna Takahashi	United States; Wu Yue; Crystal Wang; Grace Yang; Rachel Yang	Puerto Rico; Adriana Diaz; Fabiola Diaz; Melanie Diaz; Daniely Ríos

=== Medal table ===
Rank	Nation	Gold	Silver	Bronze	Total
1	Brazil	5	2	2	9
2	Canada	1	0	1	2
2	Puerto Rico	1	0	1	2
4	United States	0	3	2	5
5	Argentina	0	1	3	4
6	Cuba	0	1	1	2
7	Paraguay	0	0	2	2
8	Ecuador	0	0	1	1
8	Mexico	0	0	1	1
Totals (9 entries)		7	7	14	28

== See also ==
- Latin American Table Tennis Championships
- North American Table Tennis Championships
