= 2022 Pan American Table Tennis Championships =

Table Tennis tournament

Tournament details
- Dates: 31 October – 6 November 2022
- Edition: 5th
- Venue: National Olympic Training Center
- Location: Santiago, Chile

The 2022 Pan American Table Tennis Championships were held in Santiago, Chile, from 31 October to 6 November 2022.

== Medal summary ==
=== Events ===
Event	Gold	Silver	Bronze
Men's singles	Hugo Calderano; Brazil	Kanak Jha; United States	Santiago Lorenzo; Argentina
Men's singles	Hugo Calderano; Brazil	Kanak Jha; United States	Alberto Miño; Ecuador
Women's singles	Adriana Díaz; Puerto Rico	Lily Zhang; United States	Zhang Mo; Canada
Women's singles	Adriana Díaz; Puerto Rico	Lily Zhang; United States	Sarah Jalli; United States
Men's doubles	Argentina; Horacio Cifuentes; Gastón Alto	Chile; Gustavo Gómez; Nicolas Burgos	Brazil; Eric Jouti; Vitor Ishiy
Men's doubles	Argentina; Horacio Cifuentes; Gastón Alto	Chile; Gustavo Gómez; Nicolas Burgos	Ecuador; Emiliano Riofrio; Alberto Miño
Women's doubles	United States; Amy Wang; Rachel Sung	Brazil; Bruna Takahashi; Caroline Kumahara	Cuba; Idalys Lovet; Daniela Fonseca
Women's doubles	United States; Amy Wang; Rachel Sung	Brazil; Bruna Takahashi; Caroline Kumahara	Puerto Rico; Adriana Díaz; Melanie Díaz
Mixed doubles	Brazil; Vitor Ishiy; Bruna Takahashi	United States; Amy Wang; Nikhil Kumar	Chile; Paulina Vega; Nicolas Burgos
Mixed doubles	Brazil; Vitor Ishiy; Bruna Takahashi	United States; Amy Wang; Nikhil Kumar	Argentina; Horacio Cifuentes; Camila Arguelles
Men's team	Brazil; Eric Jouti; Vitor Ishiy; Hugo Calderano; Guilherme Teodoro	United States; Kanak Jha; Nikhil Kumar; Sharon Alguetti; Jishan Liang	Argentina; Gastón Alto; Francisco Sanchi; Horacio Cifuentes; Santiago Lorenzo
Men's team	Brazil; Eric Jouti; Vitor Ishiy; Hugo Calderano; Guilherme Teodoro	United States; Kanak Jha; Nikhil Kumar; Sharon Alguetti; Jishan Liang	Puerto Rico; Angel Naranjo; Daniel González; Brian Afanador; Oscar Birriel
Women's team	Brazil; Laura Watanabe; Giulia Takahashi; Bruna Takahashi; Caroline Kumahara	United States; Amy Wang; Lily Zhang; Sarah Jalli; Rachel Sung	Puerto Rico; Brianna Burgos; Daniely Ríos; Melanie Díaz; Adriana Díaz
Women's team	Brazil; Laura Watanabe; Giulia Takahashi; Bruna Takahashi; Caroline Kumahara	United States; Amy Wang; Lily Zhang; Sarah Jalli; Rachel Sung	Chile; Valentina Rios; Judith Morales; Paulina Vega; Daniela Ortega

=== Medal table ===
* Host nation (Chile)

Rank	Nation	Gold	Silver	Bronze	Total
1	Brazil	4	1	1	6
2	United States	1	5	1	7
3	Argentina	1	0	3	4
3	Puerto Rico	1	0	3	4
5	Chile*	0	1	2	3
6	Ecuador	0	0	2	2
7	Canada	0	0	1	1
7	Cuba	0	0	1	1
Totals (8 entries)		7	7	14	28
