= 2024 Pan American Table Tennis Championships =

- Date: 13–20 October 2024
- Edition: 7th
- Location: San Salvador, El Salvador
- Venue: Polideportivo de Ciudad Merliot
← 2023 ·	Pan American Table Tennis Championships	· 2025 →

The 2024 Pan American Table Tennis Championships is a table tennis tournament currently being held in San Salvador, El Salvador, from 13 to 20 October 2024.

== Medalists ==
Event	Gold	Silver	Bronze
Men's singles	(Brazil) Hugo Calderano	(Brazil) Vitor Ishiy	(Brazil) Leonardo Iizuka
Men's singles	(Brazil) Hugo Calderano	(Brazil) Vitor Ishiy	(Argentina) Horacio Cifuentes
Women's singles	(Puerto Rico) Adriana Diaz	(Brazil) Bruna Takahashi	(Brazil) Giulia Takahashi
Women's singles	(Puerto Rico) Adriana Diaz	(Brazil) Bruna Takahashi	(United States) Amy Wang
Men's doubles	(Argentina) Horacio Cifuentes (Argentina) Santiago Lorenzo	(Cuba) Andy Pereira (Cuba) Jorge Campos	(Brazil) Vitor Ishiy (Brazil) Guilherme Teodoro
Men's doubles	(Argentina) Horacio Cifuentes (Argentina) Santiago Lorenzo	(Cuba) Andy Pereira (Cuba) Jorge Campos	(Canada) Edward Ly (Canada) Simeon Martin
Women's doubles	(Brazil) Giulia Takahashi (Brazil) Laura Watanabe	(Chile) Paulina Vega (Chile) Daniela Ortega	(Cuba) Daniela Fonseca (Cuba) Estela Crespo
Women's doubles	(Brazil) Giulia Takahashi (Brazil) Laura Watanabe	(Chile) Paulina Vega (Chile) Daniela Ortega	(Mexico) Clio Barcenas (Mexico) Arantxa Cossio Aceves
Mixed doubles	(Brazil) Giulia Takahashi (Brazil) Guilherme Teodoro	(Brazil) Bruna Takahashi (Brazil) Hugo Calderano	(Chile) Paulina Vega (Chile) Nicolas Burgos
Mixed doubles	(Brazil) Giulia Takahashi (Brazil) Guilherme Teodoro	(Brazil) Bruna Takahashi (Brazil) Hugo Calderano	(United States) Amy Wang (United States) Jishan Liang
Men's team	(United States); Kanak Jha; Sid Naresh; Nandan Naresh; Jishan Liang	(Argentina); Horacio Cifuentes; Santiago Lorenzo; Francisco Sanchi; Martín Betancor	(Chile); Nicolás Burgos; Gustavo Gómez; Alfonso Olave; Andrés Martínez
Men's team	(United States); Kanak Jha; Sid Naresh; Nandan Naresh; Jishan Liang	(Argentina); Horacio Cifuentes; Santiago Lorenzo; Francisco Sanchi; Martín Betancor	(Cuba); Andy Pereira; Adrián Pérez; Livan Martínez; Jorge Campos
Women's team	(Cuba); Karla Pérez González; Rosalba Aguiar; Daniela Fonseca; Estela Crespo	(Chile); Zhiying Zeng; Judith Morales; Paulina Vega; Daniela Ortega	(United States); Jessica Reyes Lai; Tiffany Ke; Sally Moyland; Amy Wang
Women's team	(Cuba); Karla Pérez González; Rosalba Aguiar; Daniela Fonseca; Estela Crespo	(Chile); Zhiying Zeng; Judith Morales; Paulina Vega; Daniela Ortega	(Brazil); Bruna Takahashi; Laura Watanabe; Victoria Strassburger; Giulia Takahashi

== Medal table ==
* Host nation (El Salvador)

Rank	Nation	Gold	Silver	Bronze	Total
1	Brazil	3	3	4	10
2	Cuba	1	1	2	4
3	Argentina	1	1	1	3
4	United States	1	0	3	4
5	Puerto Rico	1	0	0	1
6	Chile	0	2	2	4
7	Canada	0	0	1	1
7	Mexico	0	0	1	1
Totals (8 entries)		7	7	14	28
