= Vitor Ishiy =

Brazilian table tennis player

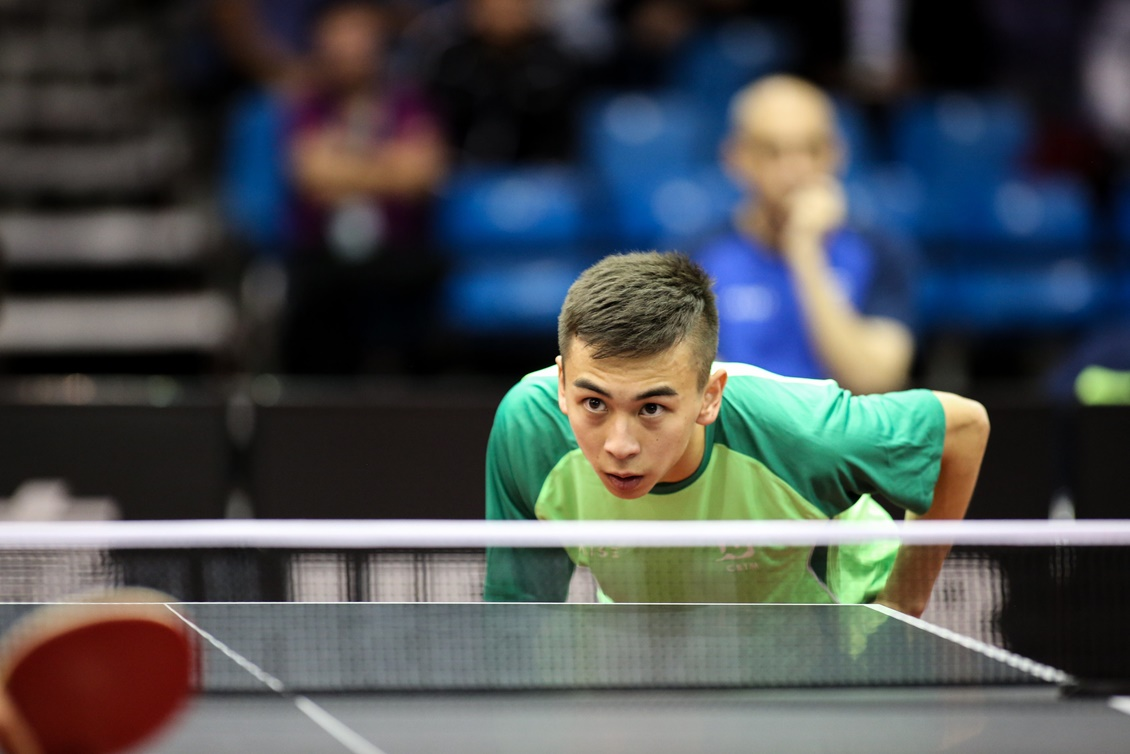
- Ishiy in 2018

Personal information
- Full name: Vitor Ishiy
- Born: 22 September 1995 (age 31) São Paulo, São Paulo, Brazil

Sport
- Sport: Table tennis
- Highest ranking: 45 (20 May 2025)
- Current ranking: 472 (28 September 2026)
Medal record
Men's table tennis
Representing Brazil
Pan American Games
Gold medal – first place	2023 Santiago	Team
Silver medal – second place	2023 Santiago	Doubles
Silver medal – second place	2023 Santiago	Mixed doubles
Pan American Championships
Gold medal – first place	2017 Cartagena	Doubles
Gold medal – first place	2017 Cartagena	Mixed doubles
Gold medal – first place	2017 Cartagena	Team
Gold medal – first place	2018 Santiago	Doubles
Gold medal – first place	2018 Santiago	Team
Gold medal – first place	2019 Asunción	Singles
Gold medal – first place	2019 Asunción	Team
Gold medal – first place	2021 Lima	Mixed Doubles
Gold medal – first place	2021 Lima	Team
Gold medal – first place	2022 Santiago	Mixed Doubles
Gold medal – first place	2022 Santiago	Team
Gold medal – first place	2023 Havana	Team
Silver medal – second place	2023 Havana	Mixed Doubles
Silver medal – second place	2024 San Salvador	Singles
Bronze medal – third place	2021 Lima	Singles
Bronze medal – third place	2021 Lima	Doubles
Bronze medal – third place	2022 Santiago	Doubles
Bronze medal – third place	2024 San Salvador	Doubles
Latin American Championships
Gold medal – first place	2016 San Juan	Mixed doubles
Gold medal – first place	2016 San Juan	Team
Bronze medal – third place	2016 San Juan	Doubles
Bronze medal – third place	2016 San Juan	Singles U21
South American Games
Gold medal – first place	2018 Cochabamba	Singles
Gold medal – first place	2018 Cochabamba	Mixed doubles
Gold medal – first place	2018 Cochabamba	Team
Bronze medal – third place	2018 Cochabamba	Doubles

Vitor Ishiy (born 22 September 1995) is a Brazilian table tennis player. He competed in the 2020 Summer Olympics and 2024 Summer Olympics for Brazil. He is currently sponsored by JOOLA.

== Career ==
=== 2016–20 ===
At the 2016 Latin American Table Tennis Championships, Ishiy won two gold medals in mixed doubles and team, and two bronzes in singles under-21 and doubles.

At the 2017 World Table Tennis Championships, participating in the mixed doubles together with Kumahara, Ishiy won the 1st round, but were eliminated in the 2nd round.

At the 2017 Pan American Table Tennis Championships, Ishiy won three gold medals in doubles, mixed doubles and team.

At the 2018 South American Games, he won three gold medals in singles, mixed doubles and men's team, and a bronze medal in men's doubles.

At the 2018 Pan American Table Tennis Championships, Ishiy won two gold medals in doubles and team.

Ishiy's biggest individual title was gold at the 2019 Pan American Table Tennis Championships, held in Asunción, Paraguay. At 23 years old, and being 121st in the world rankings, he was not among the big favorites and overcame several traditional opponents from South America. Ishiy beat home player Marcelo Aguirre (54th in the world) in the round of 16, and Colombian Alberto Mino (75th in the world) in the quarterfinals. In the semi-final, he faced his compatriot Gustavo Tsuboi, 28th in the world, where Ishiy ended up losing by two sets to zero, tied the match, lost the fifth set and again managed to draw. The decisive set was very disputed and decided in the end, in favor of Ishiy: 4 to 3 on the scoreboard (6/11, 10/12, 11/6, 11/7, 10/12, 11/3 and 11/9). Just over 70 minutes after the end of the semi-final, he faced Argentine Gastón Alto, another experienced athlete from the World Tour, defeating him by 4 sets to 1, with splits of (9–11, 11–3, 14–12, 11–4 and 11–7) to win the gold medal. In this competition, he also won a gold together with the Brazilian team.

At the 2019 World Table Tennis Championships, Ishiy participated in the singles draw, being eliminated in the 1st round. In the men's doubles, Thiago Monteiro and Ishiy won the 1st round and played an even match in the 2nd round, but lost the crucial points and the game to the pair Yun-Ju Lin and Tai-Wei Wang, from China Taipei, by 4 sets to 1 (11/5, 9/11, 9/11, 8/11 and 9/11).

=== 2020 Olympic Games ===
Ishiy was at the 2020 Olympic Games in Tokyo, where he participated in the Brazilian team made up of himself, Hugo Calderano and Gustavo Tsuboi. In the round of 16, they beat Serbia 3–2, but in the quarter-finals they were eliminated by South Korea 3–0. 8th position was the best in the country's history, in this modality.

=== 2021–24 ===
At the 2021 Pan American Table Tennis Championships, Ishiy, 63rd in the world, reached the semifinals where he faced the best table tennis player in the Americas of all time, Hugo Calderano, number 5 in the world at the moment, and ended up being eliminated by 4 sets to 0, however, ending with the individual bronze medal. In the same competition, he won gold in mixed doubles, on the Brazilian team, and a bronze in doubles.

At the 2021 World Table Tennis Championships, Ishiy participated in the singles draw, being eliminated in the 2nd round by Quadri Aruna, who reached the quarter-finals of the competition. He also participated in the men's doubles and mixed doubles, being eliminated in the 1st round of both.

At the 2022 Pan American Table Tennis Championships, Ishiy won two gold medals in mixed doubles and team, and a bronze in doubles.

At the 2023 World Table Tennis Championships, Ishiy and Takahashi participated as No.11 seeds in the mixed doubles competition, where they were eliminated in the 2nd round by the Singaporean pair. Ishiy also participated in the men's doubles together with Eric Jouti, also being eliminated in the 2nd round.

At the 2023 Pan American Table Tennis Championships in Havana, the Brazilian team made up of Ishiy, Hugo Calderano, Eric Jouti and Guilherme Teodoro won gold. With this, Ishiy, Hugo Calderano and Eric Jouti won the place to defend the Brazilian team at the Paris 2024 Olympic Games. In this competition, Ishiy also obtained a silver in the mixed doubles together with Bruna Takahashi. In singles, Ishiy beat Puerto Rican Oscar Birriel 4 sets to 3 in the first round, but later lost to Chilean Nicolas Burgos, 4 sets to 2.

At the 2023 Pan American Games in Santiago, Ishiy won gold for the Brazilian team, and silver in mixed doubles. With this, he obtained a place for the 2024 Summer Olympics in table tennis mixed doubles. Ishiy and Takahashi were ranked 11th in the mixed doubles world rankings at this time. He also won silver in doubles. In singles, Ishiy reached the second round, but was eliminated by Chilean Nicolás Burgos, second-ranked player in the Americas, number 54 in the world at the moment.

In 2024, Ishiy formed a permanent duo with Guilherme Teodoro. They reached the round of 16 of the Singapore Smash and the Saudi Smash. At the WTT Contender in Rio de Janeiro, they reached the semifinals together, obtaining the bronze medal. At the WTT Contender in Mendoza, Argentina, they reached the final, obtaining the silver medal, and reaching the position of 16th best pair in the world.

=== 2024 Olympic Games ===
At the 2024 Olympic Games, he and Bruna Takahashi were eliminated in the mixed doubles opener by 4 sets to 2. In the singles bracket, he won his first match in the Olympics, defeating Australian world number 38 Nicholas Lum by 4 sets to 0. In the second round, he faced Dimitrij Ovtcharov, two-time Olympic bronze medalist, where he still won a set against the German, but ended up being eliminated by 4 sets to 1. He also participated in the team competition, where Brazil equaled its best ever placing in the Olympics, reaching the quarterfinals.

=== 2024-2028 ===
At the 2024 Pan American Table Tennis Championships, Ishiy was runner-up, losing only to Hugo Calderano in the final.

After winning silver at this competition, Ishiy reached world number 46 in the ITTF rankings in January 2025, the best ranking he achieved in his career.

At the WTT Star Contender in Foz do Iguaçu, in August 2025, he reached the round of 16.

== Best results by type of tournament ==
=== Singles ===
Ishiy's best ranking was no.45 in the world in 2025.

- Pan American Table Tennis Championships: Champion (2019)
- Pan American Games: Round of 16 (2023)
- WTT Contender: Round of 16 (Tunis 2021, Rio 2023, Mendoza 2024)
- WTT Star Contender: Round of 16 (Foz do Iguaçu 2025)
- World Table Tennis Championships: Second round (2021)
- Olympic Games: Second round (Paris 2024)

=== Doubles ===
Ishiy and Guilherme Teodoro reached the position of 12th best duo in the world in January 2025.

- Pan American Table Tennis Championships: Champion (2017, 2018)
- Pan American Games: Runner-up (2023)
- WTT Contender: Runner-up (Mendoza 2024)
- WTT Star Contender: Round of 16 (Doha 2024)
- Grand Smash: Round of 16 (Singapore 2024, Saudi 2024)
- World Table Tennis Championships: Second round (2019, 2023)

=== Mixed doubles ===
Playing with Bruna Takahashi, he reached number 11 in the world in this modality in 2023.

- Pan American Table Tennis Championships: Champion (2017, 2021, 2022)
- Pan American Games: Runner-up (2023)
- WTT Contender: Bronze medal (Tunis 2022)
- WTT Star Contender: Quarterfinals (Doha 2021)
- Grand Smash: Round of 16 (Singapore 2024)
- World Table Tennis Championships: Second round (Düsseldorf 2017, Durban 2023)
- Olympic Games: Round of 16 (Paris 2024)

=== Team ===
From April 2021 to June 2023, the Brazil team was the 6th best in the world.

- Pan American Table Tennis Championships: Champion (2017, 2018, 2019, 2021, 2022, 2023)
- Pan American Games: Champion (2023)
- Table Tennis World Cup: Quarterfinals (Tokyo 2019)
- World Table Tennis Championships: Round of 16 (Chengdu 2022)
- Olympic Games: Quarterfinals (Tokyo 2020, Paris 2024)
