= 2021 Pan American Table Tennis Championships =

Table Tennis tournament

Tournament details
- Dates: 13–19 November 2021
- Edition: 4th
- Venue: VIDENA
- Location: Lima, Peru

Champions
- Men's singles: (Brazil) Hugo Calderano
- Women's singles: (Puerto Rico) Adriana Díaz
- Men's doubles: (Argentina) Gastón Alto (Argentina) Horacio Cifuentes
- Women's doubles: (Puerto Rico) Adriana Díaz (Puerto Rico) Melanie Díaz
- Mixed doubles: (Brazil) Vitor Ishiy (Brazil) Bruna Takahashi

The 2021 Pan American Table Tennis Championships were held in Lima, Peru from 13 to 19 November 2021.

== Medal summary ==
=== Events ===
Event	Gold	Silver	Bronze
Men's singles	(Brazil) Hugo Calderano	(Canada) Eugene Wang	(Brazil) Vitor Ishiy
Men's singles	(Brazil) Hugo Calderano	(Canada) Eugene Wang	(Paraguay) Marcelo Aguirre
Women's singles	(Puerto Rico) Adriana Díaz	(Brazil) Bruna Takahashi	(Brazil) Caroline Kumahara
Women's singles	(Puerto Rico) Adriana Díaz	(Brazil) Bruna Takahashi	(United States) Lily Zhang
Men's doubles	(Argentina) Gastón Alto (Argentina) Horacio Cifuentes	(Chile) Gustavo Gómez (Chile) Juan Lamadrid	(Brazil) Eric Jouti (Brazil) Vitor Ishiy
Men's doubles	(Argentina) Gastón Alto (Argentina) Horacio Cifuentes	(Chile) Gustavo Gómez (Chile) Juan Lamadrid	(Puerto Rico) Daniel González (Puerto Rico) Brian Afanador
Women's doubles	(Puerto Rico) Melanie Díaz (Puerto Rico) Adriana Díaz	(Chile) Daniela Ortega (Chile) Paulina Vega	(United States) Tiffany Ke (United States) Sarah Jalli
Women's doubles	(Puerto Rico) Melanie Díaz (Puerto Rico) Adriana Díaz	(Chile) Daniela Ortega (Chile) Paulina Vega	(Guatemala) Lucia Cordero (Guatemala) Hidalynn Zapata
Mixed doubles	(Brazil) Bruna Takahashi (Brazil) Vitor Ishiy	(Argentina) Camila Argüelles (Argentina) Horacio Cifuentes	(Brazil) Caroline Kumahara (Brazil) Eric Jouti
Mixed doubles	(Brazil) Bruna Takahashi (Brazil) Vitor Ishiy	(Argentina) Camila Argüelles (Argentina) Horacio Cifuentes	(Argentina) Ana Codina (Argentina) Gaston Alto
Men's team	Brazil; Gustavo Tsuboi; Hugo Calderano; Eric Jouti; Vitor Ishiy	Chile; Juan Lamadrid; Felipe Olivares; Gustavo Gomez	Argentina; Gastón Alto; Horacio Cifuentes; Francisco Sanchi; Santiago Lorenzo
Men's team	Brazil; Gustavo Tsuboi; Hugo Calderano; Eric Jouti; Vitor Ishiy	Chile; Juan Lamadrid; Felipe Olivares; Gustavo Gomez	United States; Nikhil Kumar; Sharon Alguetti; Kai Zhang; Yahao Zhang
Women's team	Brazil; Caroline Kumahara; Jessica Yamada; Bruna Takahashi	Canada; Ivy Liao; May Hui Tong; Mo Zhang; Ching Nam Fu	United States; Lily Zhang; Amy Wang; Sarah Jalli; Tiffany Ke
Women's team	Brazil; Caroline Kumahara; Jessica Yamada; Bruna Takahashi	Canada; Ivy Liao; May Hui Tong; Mo Zhang; Ching Nam Fu	Chile; Paulina Vega; Judith Morales; Daniela Ortega

=== Medal table ===
Rank	Nation	Gold	Silver	Bronze	Total
1	Brazil	4	1	4	9
2	Puerto Rico	2	0	1	3
3	Argentina	1	1	2	4
4	Chile	0	3	1	4
5	Canada	0	2	0	2
6	United States	0	0	4	4
7	Guatemala	0	0	1	1
7	Paraguay	0	0	1	1
Totals (8 entries)		7	7	14	28
