= 2023 Pan American Table Tennis Championships =

- Date: September 10–17 2023
- Edition: 6th
- Location: Havana, Cuba
- Venue: Expocuba
- Pan American Table Tennis Championships

The 2023 Pan American Table Tennis Championships is a table tennis tournament held in Havana, Cuba, from 10 to 17 September 2023.

== Medalists ==
Event	Gold	Silver	Bronze
Men's singles	(Brazil) Hugo Calderano	(Chile) Nicolas Burgos	(Puerto Rico) Brian Afanador
Men's singles	(Brazil) Hugo Calderano	(Chile) Nicolas Burgos	(Argentina) Santiago Lorenzo
Women's singles	(United States) Amy Wang	(Brazil) Bruna Takahashi	(Puerto Rico) Adriana Diaz
Women's singles	(United States) Amy Wang	(Brazil) Bruna Takahashi	(United States) Lily Zhang
Men's doubles	(Chile) Gustavo Gomez (Chile) Nicolas Burgos	(Argentina) Gaston Alto (Argentina) Horacio Cifuentes	(Mexico) Marcos Madrid (Mexico) Rogelio Castro
Men's doubles	(Chile) Gustavo Gomez (Chile) Nicolas Burgos	(Argentina) Gaston Alto (Argentina) Horacio Cifuentes	(Ecuador) Alberto Mino (Ecuador) Emiliano Riofrio
Women's doubles	(Puerto Rico) Adriana Diaz (Puerto Rico) Melanie Diaz	(Canada) Mo Zhang (Canada) Ivy Liao	(Chile) Daniela Ortega (Chile) Paulina Vega
Women's doubles	(Puerto Rico) Adriana Diaz (Puerto Rico) Melanie Diaz	(Canada) Mo Zhang (Canada) Ivy Liao	(Brazil) Bruna Takahashi (Brazil) Giulia Takahashi
Mixed doubles	(Chile) Nicolas Burgos (Chile) Paulina Vega	(Brazil) Bruna Takahashi (Brazil) Vitor Ishiy	(Cuba) Jorge Campos (Cuba) Daniela Fonseca Carrazana
Mixed doubles	(Chile) Nicolas Burgos (Chile) Paulina Vega	(Brazil) Bruna Takahashi (Brazil) Vitor Ishiy	(Mexico) Yadira Silva (Mexico) Marcos Madrid
Men's team	Brazil; Eric Jouti; Hugo Calderano; Vitor Ishiy; Guilherme Teodoro	Canada; Eugene Wang; Matthew Lehmann; Edward Ly; Simeon Martin	Chile; Felipe Olivares; Gustavo Gomez; Alfonso Olave; Nicolas Burgos
Men's team	Brazil; Eric Jouti; Hugo Calderano; Vitor Ishiy; Guilherme Teodoro	Canada; Eugene Wang; Matthew Lehmann; Edward Ly; Simeon Martin	Puerto Rico; Daniel Gonzalez; Brian Afanador; Angel Naranjo; Oscar Birriel
Women's team	United States; Lily Zhang; Amy Wang; Rachel Sung; Sally Moyland	Brazil; Bruna Alexandre; Bruna Takahashi; Giulia Takahashi; Laura Watanabe	Puerto Rico; Melanie Diaz; Adriana Diaz; Fabiola Diaz; Brianna Burgos
Women's team	United States; Lily Zhang; Amy Wang; Rachel Sung; Sally Moyland	Brazil; Bruna Alexandre; Bruna Takahashi; Giulia Takahashi; Laura Watanabe	Chile; Paulina Vega; Judith Morales; Daniela Ortega; Zhiying Zeng

== Medal table ==
* Host nation (Cuba)

Rank	Nation	Gold	Silver	Bronze	Total
1	Brazil	2	3	1	6
2	Chile	2	1	3	6
3	United States	2	0	1	3
4	Puerto Rico	1	0	4	5
5	Canada	0	2	0	2
6	Argentina	0	1	1	2
7	Mexico	0	0	2	2
8	Cuba*	0	0	1	1
8	Ecuador	0	0	1	1
Totals (9 entries)		7	7	14	28
