= Zhou Xin =

Zhou Xin may refer to:

- Zhou Xin (Han dynasty) (周昕), a military general serving under the Han dynasty warlord Wang Lang
- Zhou Xin (紂辛), a pejorative for Di Xin
- Zhou Xin (footballer) (born 1998), Chinese footballer
- Zhou Xin (table tennis) (周鑫), American table tennis player and coach
