= Table tennis at the 2019 Pan American Games – Qualification =

The following is the qualification system and list of qualified nations for the table tennis at the 2019 Pan American Games competition.

== Qualification system ==
A total of 84 athletes will qualify to compete (42 men and 42 women). Each nation may enter a maximum of 6 athletes (three per gender). In each gender there will be a total of 12 teams qualified, with one team per event reserved for the host nation Peru. Six places will be allocated for singles events (by gender) to athletes that have obtained the best results at the qualification tournament for singles events of the Pan American Games. Athletes qualified through various qualifying events.

The top six teams (for men and women) at the 2018 Pan American Championships, the top placed team from the Caribbean, Central America, South America and North America (not already qualified), and the top team not qualified as of the May 2019 world rankings each qualified a team. As stated earlier, Peru also qualified a team in each event. The last 6 spots were awarded to individuals, with a maximum of two per nation.

== Qualification timeline ==
Event	Date	Venue
Pan American Championships	November 20–25	(Chile) Santiago
2019 Caribbean Championships	March 24–25	(Guyana) Georgetown
2019 Central American Championships	April 2–6	Guatemala City
2019 South American Championships	April 2–7	(Argentina) Buenos Aires
North American Selection	—	—
World team ranking	May 1, 2019	—
2019 Qualification Tournament	May 24–25	Guatemala City

== Qualification summary ==
NOC	Men		Women		Total
NOC	Individual	Team	Individual	Team	Total
Argentina	3	X	3	X	6
Brazil	3	X	3	X	6
Canada	3	X	3	X	6
Chile	3	X	3	X	6
Colombia	1		3	X	4
Cuba	3	X	3	X	6
Dominican Republic	3	X	3	X	6
Ecuador	3	X	2		5
Guatemala	2		3	X	5
Guyana			1		1
Honduras	1				1
Mexico	3	X	3	X	6
Paraguay	3	X	1		4
Peru	3	X	3	X	6
Puerto Rico	3	X	3	X	6
Trinidad and Tobago			1		1
United States	3	X	3	X	6
Venezuela	2		1		3
Total: 18 NOCs	42	12	42	12	84

== Men ==
Competition/Ranking	Athletes per NOC	Total	Qualified
Host Nation	3	3	Peru
Pan American Championships	3	18	Brazil; Chile; Paraguay; United States; Argentina; Cuba
Caribbean	3	3	Puerto Rico
Central America	3	3	Mexico
South America	3	3	Ecuador
North America	3	3	Canada
World team ranking	3	3	Dominican Republic
Individuals	1	6	Jose You (HON); Julien Ramos (COL); Hector Gatica (GUA); Cecilio Correa (VEN); Heber Moscoso (GUA); Marco Navas (VEN)
TOTAL		42	

== Women ==
Competition/Ranking	Athletes per NOC	Total	Qualified
Host Nation	3	3	Peru
Pan American Championships	3	18	Brazil; Canada; Cuba; United States; Argentina; Puerto Rico
Caribbean	3	3	Dominican Republic
Central America	3	3	Guatemala
South America	3	3	Colombia
North America	~~3~~	~~3~~	—
World team ranking	3	6	Chile; Mexico
Individuals	1	6	Mylena Plaza (ECU); Nathaly Paredes (ECU); Chelsea Edghill (GUY); Neridee Nino (VEN); Rheann Chung (TRI); Layla Gomez (PAR)
TOTAL		42	

- No North American selection occurred, as both Canada and the USA already qualified.
