= Daniela Fonseca =

Cuban table tennis player

Personal information
- Full name: Daniela de la Caridad Fonseca Carrazana
- Nationality: Cuban
- Born: 24 July 2002 (age 23)

Sport
- Sport: Table tennis
Medal record
Women's table tennis
Representing Cuba
Pan American Games
Gold medal – first place	2023 Santiago	Mixed doubles
Pan American Championships
Bronze medal – third place	2024 San Salvador	Doubles

Daniela de la Caridad Fonseca Carrazana (born 24 July 2002) is a Cuban table tennis player.

== Career ==
She represented Cuba at the 2019 Pan American Games which was also her debut appearance at the Pan American Games. She represented Cuba at the 2020 Summer Olympics which also marked her debut appearance at the Olympics. She competed in women's singles events and also teamed up with Jorge Campos to compete in the mixed doubles event.
