= Table tennis at the 2020 Summer Olympics – Mixed doubles =

Table tennis – mixed doubles at the Games of the XXXII Olympiad
- Venue: Tokyo Metropolitan Gymnasium
- Date: 24–26 July 2021
- Competitors: 32 from 16 nations

Medalists
1st place, gold medalist(s)		Jun Mizutani; Mima Ito	Japan
2nd place, silver medalist(s)		Xu Xin; Liu Shiwen	China
3rd place, bronze medalist(s)		Lin Yun-ju; Cheng I-ching	Chinese Taipei

The mixed doubles table tennis event was part of the table tennis programme at the 2020 Summer Olympics in Tokyo. The event took place from 24 July to 26 July 2021 at Tokyo Metropolitan Gymnasium. This was the first time this event was ever contested in the Summer Olympics. Jun Mizutani and Mima Ito won Japan's first-ever table tennis Olympic gold medal.

The medals for the competition were presented by Li Lingwei, IOC Member, China; and the medalists' bouquets were presented by Raul Calin, ITTF Secretary General; Spain.

== Schedule ==
Legend
P	Preliminary round	¼	Quarter-finals	½	Semi-finals	F	Final

Sat 24	Sun 25		Mon 26
P	¼	½	F

== Seeds ==
The seeds were revealed on 18 July 2021. The results of the draw were announced on 21 July at the Tokyo Metropolitan Gymnasium.

1. Xu Xin / Liu Shiwen (CHN) (final, silver medalists)
2. Jun Mizutani / Mima Ito (JPN) (champions, gold medalists)
3. Lin Yun-ju / Cheng I-ching (TPE) (semifinals, bronze medalists)
4. Wong Chun Ting / Doo Hoi Kem (HKG) (quarterfinals)
5. Ľubomír Pištej / Barbora Balážová (SVK) (first round)
6. Lee Sang-su / Jeon Ji-hee (KOR) (quarterfinals)
7. Patrick Franziska / Petrissa Solja (GER) (quarterfinals)
8. Emmanuel Lebesson / Jia Nan Yuan (FRA) (semifinals, fourth place)
9. Ovidiu Ionescu / Bernadette Szőcs (ROU) (quarterfinals)
10. Stefan Fegerl / Sofia Polcanova (AUT) (first round)
11. Ádám Szudi / Szandra Pergel (HUN) (first round)
12. Sharath Kamal / Manika Batra (IND) (first round)
13. Hu Heming / Melissa Tapper (AUS) (first round)
14. Omar Assar / Dina Meshref (EGY) (first round)
15. Eugene Wang / Zhang Mo (CAN) (first round)
16. Jorge Campos / Daniela Fonseca (CUB) (first round)

== Draw ==
First round
1	Xu X. (CHN); Liu S.W. (CHN)	9	11	11	11	11
15	E. Wang (CAN); M. Zhang (CAN)	11	8	7	8	6
9	O. Ionescu (ROU); B. Szőcs (ROU)	11	11	12	11	11
5	L. Pištej (SVK); B. Balážová (SVK)	8	8	14	4	9
8	E. Lebesson (FRA); J.N. Yuan (FRA)	11	11	11	11
13	H.M. Hu (AUS); M. Tapper (AUS)	5	9	1	0
11	A. Szudi (HUN); S. Pergel (HUN)	6	5	3	9
4	Wong C.T. (HKG); Doo H.K. (HKG)	11	11	11	11
3	Lin Y.J. (TPE); Cheng I.C. (TPE)	11	11	11	11
12	Achanta S.K. (IND); M. Batra (IND)	8	6	5	4
14	O. Assar (EGY); D. Meshref (EGY)	11	3	5	7	8
6	Lee S.S. (KOR); Jeon J.H. (KOR)	9	11	11	11	11
7	P. Franziska (GER); P. Solja (GER)	11	11	11	11
16	J. Campos (CUB); D. Fonseca (CUB)	5	7	8	7
10	S. Fegerl (AUT); S. Polcanova (AUT)	5	11	9	4	4
2	J. Mizutani (JPN); M. Ito (JPN)	11	8	11	11	11

Quarterfinals
1	Xu X. (CHN); Liu S.W. (CHN)	11	11	11	12
9	O. Ionescu (ROU); B. Szőcs (ROU)	6	1	6	10
8	E. Lebesson (FRA); J.N. Yuan (FRA)	11	6	7	11	9	11	13
4	Wong C.T. (HKG); Doo H.K. (HKG)	3	11	11	8	11	7	11
3	Lin Y.J. (TPE); Cheng I.C. (TPE)	7	11	7	11	11	11
6	Lee S.S. (KOR); Jeon J.H. (KOR)	11	4	11	7	8	7
7	P. Franziska (GER); P. Solja (GER)	8	11	11	3	11	8	14
2	J. Mizutani (JPN); M. Ito (JPN)	11	5	3	11	9	11	16

Semifinals
1	Xu X. (CHN); Liu S.W. (CHN)	11	11	13	11
8	E. Lebesson (FRA); J.N. Yuan (FRA)	5	6	11	7
3	Lin Y.J. (TPE); Cheng I.C. (TPE)	9	11	9	6	6
2	J. Mizutani (JPN); M. Ito (JPN)	11	6	11	11	11

Gold medal match
1	Xu X. (CHN); Liu S.W. (CHN)	11	11	8	9	9	11	6
2	J. Mizutani (JPN); M. Ito (JPN)	5	7	11	11	11	6	11
Bronze medal match
8	E. Lebesson (FRA); J.N. Yuan (FRA)	8	7	8	5
3	Lin Y.J. (TPE); Cheng I.C. (TPE)	11	11	11	11
