= Zhou Xin (table tennis) =

American table tennis player

Personal information
- Nationality: American
- Born: December 30, 1988 (age 36); Milpitas, California, USA
- Height: 6 ft 3 in (191 cm)

Sport
- Country: United States
- Sport: Table tennis

Zhou Xin (born December 30, 1988) is an American table tennis player. He qualified to represent Team USA in the 2020 Summer Olympics, competing on the men's team alongside Kanak Jha and Nikhil Kumar. Zhou and Kumar were defeated by Swedish Anton Källberg and Kristian Karlsson in the doubles match and he also lost to Anton Källberg in the singles match.
