= Edward Ly =

Canadian table tennis player

Personal information
- Born: January 29, 2003 (age 23) Montreal, Quebec, Canada

Sport
- Sport: Table tennis
Medal record
Men's Table tennis
Representing Canada
Pan American Cup
Gold medal – first place	Corpus Christi 2024	Men's singles
Pan American Games
Silver medal – second place	2023 Santiago	Men's team
Pan American Championships
Silver medal – second place	2023 Havana	Men's team
Bronze medal – third place	2024 San Salvador	Doubles
Pan American Youth Championships
Silver medal – second place	2021 Santo Domingo	U-19 Mixed doubles
Bronze medal – third place	2021 Santo Domingo	U-19 Men's Singles
Bronze medal – third place	2019 Cancun	Junior Men's team

Edward Ly (born January 29, 2003 in Montreal, Quebec) is a Canadian Olympic table tennis athlete.

== Career ==
At the 2019 Canada Winter Games in Red Deer, Alberta, Ly won three gold medals representing his home province of Quebec. Ly would then compete on the international stage, winning three medals across two editions of the Pan American Youth Championships. Ly's first major games was the 2022 Commonwealth Games. The following year, in July, Ly was named to Canada's 2023 Pan American Games team. Ly would help the Canadian men's team to a silver medal at the Pan American Championships in September 2023. The win also secured 2024 Olympics qualification for the team. Shortly after, Ly would repeat his performance at the 2023 Pan American Games, with a silver medal in the men's team event.

At the 2024 Pan American Cup, Ly was called up last minute to replace Eugene Wang. Ly Would go onto win the gold medal at the event, jumping his world ranking to 36th. In June 2024, Ly qualified to compete for Canada at the 2024 Summer Olympics.

== Personal life ==
Ly started table tennis at the age of 8. Ly is currently studying natural sciences at Cégep André-Laurendeau.
