= Gui Lin =

Brazilian table tennis player

Personal information
- Nationality: Brazil
- Born: 1 October 1993 (age 32) Nanning, Guangxi, China

Sport
- Sport: Table tennis
- Highest ranking: 87 (1 June 2019)
Medal record
Women's table tennis
Representing Brazil
Pan American Games
Silver medal – second place	2015 Toronto	Singles
Silver medal – second place	2015 Toronto	Team
Pan American Championships
Gold medal – first place	2017 Cartagena de Indias	Team
Silver medal – second place	2017 Cartagena de Indias	Mixed doubles
Bronze medal – third place	2017 Cartagena de Indias	Doubles
Latin American Championships
Gold medal – first place	2016 San Juan	Singles
Gold medal – first place	2016 San Juan	Team
Gold medal – first place	2015 Buenos Aires	Singles
Gold medal – first place	2015 Buenos Aires	Doubles

Gui Lin (Chinese: 林桂; pinyin: Lín Guì, born 1 October 1993 in Nanning, China) is a table tennis player from Brazil. She was naturalized as a Brazilian in 2012 and was selected to be part of the Brazilian National Team competing in table tennis at the 2012 Summer Olympics. She was awarded 2 silver medals in her sport during the 2015 Pan American Games. She currently trains under the supervision of Pan-American Medalist Hugo Hoyama. She also holds Chinese nationality.

== Personal life ==
Lin has been living in Brazil since the age of 12 as an exchange student and naturalized Brazilian at the age of 18. She speaks fluent Portuguese and identifies with Brazilian culture, claiming to be "Brazilian at heart from birth". She currently lives in São Bernardo do Campo where she trains with Hugo Hoyama, who, like her, identifies with soccer team Sociedade Esportiva Palmeiras. She held a relationship with soccer player Chen Zhizhao.

== Criticism ==
She has been the target of criticism for being selected over Jessica Yamada to be the third player on the Brazilian Team for the 2012 Olympic Games despite being lower-ranked at the time. The Brazilian Team coach argued that his choice for Lin was technical, stating that Lin was currently the best Brazilian player overall and was lower-ranked due to injuries in the previous season, which made her unable to play and consequently dropping positions on the ranking.
