= Jishan Liang =

American table tennis player

Personal information
- Nationality: United States
- Born: November 8, 1991 (age 34) Tianjin, China
- Height: 6'0

Sport
- Sport: Table tennis
Medal record
Men's table tennis
Representing the United States
Pan American Games
Bronze medal – third place	2023 Santiago	Team
Pan American Championships
Gold medal – first place	2024 San Salvador	Team
Silver medal – second place	2022 Santiago	Team
Silver medal – second place	2025 Rock Hill	Team
Bronze medal – third place	2024 San Salvador	Mixed doubles
Bronze medal – third place	2025 Rock Hill	Mixed doubles
US Open
Gold medal – first place	2021 Las Vegas	Men's doubles
Gold medal – first place	2025 Las Vegas	Mixed doubles
Bronze medal – third place	2024 Las Vegas	Mixed doubles
US National Championships
Gold medal – first place	2026 San Jose	Mixed doubles
Silver medal – second place	2023 Fort Worth	Men's doubles
Bronze medal – third place	2021 Las Vegas	Men's singles
Bronze medal – third place	2022 Fort Worth	Men's doubles
Bronze medal – third place	2025 Ontario	Men's singles

Jishan Liang (born November 8, 1991) is an American table tennis player and coach.

== Early life ==
Liang was born in Tianjin, China, and began table tennis at seven years old. At 19 years old, he was eligible for an EB-1A green card, and moved to the United States. He resides in Cary, North Carolina and is a coach at NC International Table Tennis.

== Career ==
Liang made his international debut for the United States at the 2022 Pan American Table Tennis Championships and won a silver medal in the team event.

He made his World Table Tennis Championships debut in 2023. On October 13, 2023, he was named to team USA's roster to compete at the 2023 Pan American Games. During the Pan American Games, he won a bronze medal in the team event.

In February 2024, he competed at the 2024 World Team Table Tennis Championships in the team event. On February 20, 2024, during the final group stage match against Kazakhstan, Liang was disqualified due to his racket's rubber being too thick. This automatically forced the team to fourth place in the group, and as a result did not advance to the playoffs. USA Table Tennis challenged the disqualification, however, the International Table Tennis Federation (ITTF) jury committee declined the appeal.

In October 2024, he competed at the 2024 Pan American Table Tennis Championships and won team USA's first ever gold medal in the team event at the Pan American Table Tennis Championships, along with Kanak Jha, Nandan Naresh and Sid Naresh. He also won a bronze medal in the mixed doubles event, with Amy Wang.

== Major League Table Tennis ==
In 2023, Liang became a charter member of Major League Table Tennis (MLTT) after being drafted by the Princeton Revolution. Competing in the league's inaugural 2023–24 season, he helped lead the Revolution to the playoffs as the second-place team in the East Division. During the 2024 MLTT Championship Weekend, Liang competed in the finals against the Texas Smash, eventually finishing as a league runner-up. Known for his powerful forehand and "all-in" playing style, he was frequently featured in league highlights for his high-energy performances.

For the 2024–25 season, Liang joined the New York Slice. Throughout his tenure in the league, he has remained one of the top-ranked American players in the MLTT "SPINDEX" rating system, consistently competing in both singles and doubles events.

== Personal life ==
Liang's wife, Hong Lin, is a professional table tennis player and coach. They have a son named Willam.
