= Alexandre Cassin =

French table tennis player

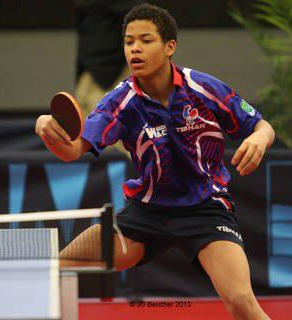
- Cassin in 2013

Personal information
- Nationality: French
- Born: 5 October 1998 (age 28) Basse-Terre, Guadeloupe

Sport
- Sport: Table tennis

Alexandre Cassin (born 5 October 1998) is a French table tennis player. He competed in the 2020 Summer Olympics for France.
