= Andy Pereira =

Cuban table tennis player

Personal information
- Born: 31 August 1989 (age 36) Ciudad de la Habana, Cuba

Sport
- Sport: Table tennis
Medal record
Men's table tennis
Representing Cuba
Central American and Caribbean Games
Gold medal – first place	2006 Cartagena	Team
Gold medal – first place	2006 Cartagena	Doubles
Silver medal – second place	2014 Veracruz	Team
Pan American Championships
Silver medal – second place	2024 San Salvador	Doubles
Pan American Games
Gold medal – first place	2023 Santiago	Doubles
Silver medal – second place	2023 Santiago	Singles
Bronze medal – third place	2011 Guadalajara	Team

Andy Pereira (born 31 August 1989) is a Cuban table tennis player. He competed at the 2012 Summer Olympics in the Men's singles, but was defeated in the first round.

== Career ==
Pereira participated in the 2006 Central American and Caribbean Games held in Cartagena, Colombia, winning the gold medal in doubles and team competition.
