= Jorge Campos (table tennis) =

Cuban table tennis player (born 1991)

Personal information
- Full name: Jorge Moisés Campos Valdés
- Nationality: Cuba
- Born: 19 September 1991 (age 35) Havana, Cuba
- Height: 184 cm (6 ft 1/2 in)
- Weight: 77 kg (170 lb; 12.1 st)

Sport
- Sport: Table tennis
- Club: (Greece) Panathinaikos
- Current ranking: 550 (28 September 2026)
Medal record
Men's table tennis
Representing Cuba
Pan American Games
Gold medal – first place	2023 Santiago	Doubles
Gold medal – first place	2023 Santiago	Mixed doubles
Bronze medal – third place	2011 Guadalajara	Team
Bronze medal – third place	2019 Lima	Team
Pan American Championships
Silver medal – second place	2024 San Salvador	Doubles

Jorge Moisés Campos Valdés (born 19 September 1991) is a Cuban table tennis player. On the club level he competes for Panathinaikos.

He competed at the 2016 Summer Olympics in the men's singles event, in which he was eliminated in the first round by Eugene Wang. He also competed at the 2020 Summer Olympics in the mixed doubles event, with fellow Cuban athlete Daniela Fonseca.
