= Horacio Cifuentes =

Argentine table tennis player

Personal information
- Full name: Horacio Cifuentes
- Nickname: El Chill
- Nationality: Argentine
- Born: 16 March 1998 (age 28) La Plata, Argentina

Sport
- Sport: Table tennis
- Club: Amiens Sport Tennis de Table (France)
- Playing style: Right-handed, shakehand grip
- Highest ranking: 66 (February 2020)
- Current ranking: 92 (2 November 2026)
Medal record
Men's table tennis
Representing Argentina
Pan American Games
| Silver medal – second place | 2019 Lima | Doubles |
| Silver medal – second place | 2019 Lima | Team |
| Bronze medal – third place | 2023 Santiago | Doubles |
| Bronze medal – third place | 2023 Santiago | Team |
Pan American Championship
| Gold medal – first place | 2019 Asunción | Doubles |
| Gold medal – first place | 2021 Lima | Doubles |
| Gold medal – first place | 2022 Santiago | Doubles |
| Gold medal – first place | 2024 San Salvador | Doubles |
| Gold medal – first place | 2025 Rock Hill | Team |
| Silver medal – second place | 2017 Cartagena de Indias | Team |
| Silver medal – second place | 2018 Santiago | Singles |
| Silver medal – second place | 2021 Lima | Mixed doubles |
| Silver medal – second place | 2023 Havana | Doubles |
| Bronze medal – third place | 2017 Cartagena de Indias | Singles |
| Bronze medal – third place | 2018 Santiago | Doubles |
| Bronze medal – third place | 2019 Asunción | Mixed doubles |
| Bronze medal – third place | 2021 Lima | Team |
| Bronze medal – third place | 2022 Santiago | Mixed doubles |
| Bronze medal – third place | 2022 Santiago | Team |
| Bronze medal – third place | 2024 San Salvador | Singles |
| Bronze medal – third place | 2025 Rock Hill | Singles |
| Bronze medal – third place | 2025 Rock Hill | Doubles |

Horacio Cifuentes (born 16 March 1998) is an Argentine table tennis player. He represented Argentina at the 2020 Summer Olympics in Tokyo, competing in the men's singles event.

Cifuentes has been one of the leading players in Argentine table tennis during the 2010s and 2020s. He achieved a career-high ranking of world No. 66 in February 2020 in the International Table Tennis Federation (ITTF) rankings.

== Career ==
Cifuentes began competing internationally as a junior representing Argentina. He gained prominence in continental competitions, winning multiple medals at the Pan American Table Tennis Championships and the Pan American Games.

At the 2019 Pan American Games in Lima, he won two silver medals in the men's doubles and men's team events. At the 2023 Pan American Games in Santiago, he added two bronze medals in doubles and team competitions.

Throughout his career, Cifuentes has frequently partnered with fellow Argentine player Gastón Alto in doubles events, achieving several continental titles. He has also played professionally in Europe, representing the Amiens Sport Tennis de Table.
