= Kanak Jha =

American table tennis player (born 2000)

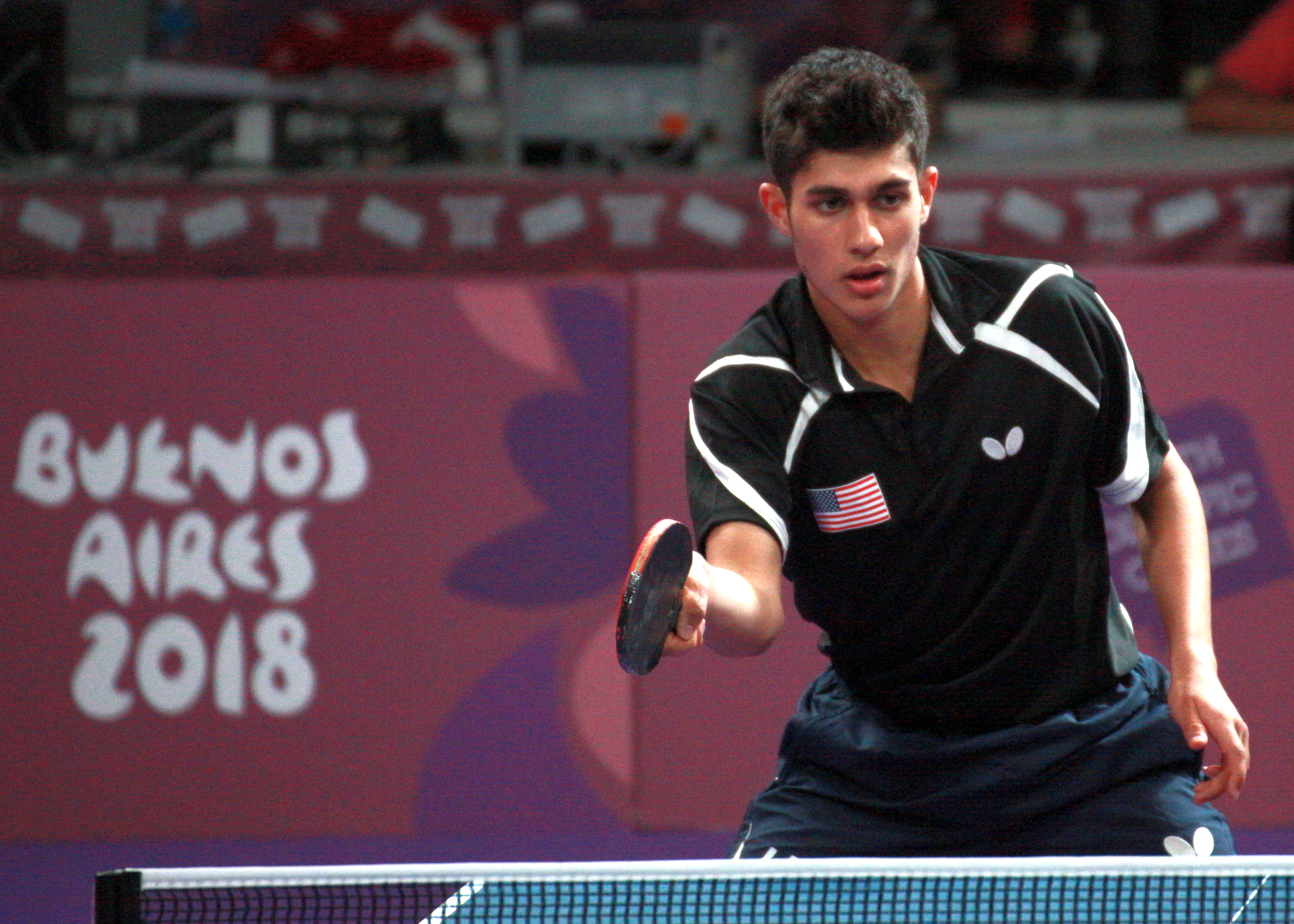
- Jha at the 2018 Youth Olympics, Boys' bronze medal match

Personal information
- Nationality: United States
- Born: June 19, 2000 (age 26) Milpitas, California, U.S.

Sport
- Country: United States
- Sport: Table tennis
- Highest ranking: 19 (3 January 2023)
- Current ranking: 24 (5 October 2026)
Medal record
Men's table tennis
Representing the United States
Pan American Games
Gold medal – first place	2019 Lima	Team
Bronze medal – third place	2019 Lima	Singles
Bronze medal – third place	2019 Lima	Mixed doubles
Pan American Championship
Gold medal – first place	2018 Santiago	Singles
Gold medal – first place	2024 San Salvador	Team
Silver medal – second place	2018 Santiago	Mixed doubles
Silver medal – second place	2018 Santiago	Team
Silver medal – second place	2022 Santiago	Singles
Silver medal – second place	2022 Santiago	Team
Silver medal – second place	2025 Rock Hill	Singles
Silver medal – second place	2025 Rock Hill	Team
Bronze medal – third place	2019 Asunción	Singles
Bronze medal – third place	2019 Asunción	Team
Pan American Cup
Gold medal – first place	2025 San Francisco	Singles
Silver medal – second place	2019 Guaynabo	Singles
Bronze medal – third place	2018 Asunción	Singles
Bronze medal – third place	2020 Guaynabo	Singles
Youth Olympic Games
Bronze medal – third place	2018 Buenos Aires	Singles

Kanak Jha (/kəˈnɑːk ˈdʒɑː/ kə-NAHK JAH; born June 19, 2000) is an American professional table tennis player. Ranked No. 22 in the world, he is the second male player from the Americas in the ITTF/WTT rankings, after Brazil's Hugo Calderano. He was the US national champion five times, winning the national title between 2016 and 2019 for a record four straight national titles and adding a fifth title in 2024 on his way to the Olympics in Paris.

== Career ==
=== 2016 ===
Jha competed at the 2016 Summer Olympics in the men's singles event and as part of the American team in the men's team event.

He was the youngest American athlete to participate in the 2016 Olympics and is also the first American born in the 2000s to qualify for the Olympics.

=== 2018 ===
Jha also competed at the 2018 Summer Youth Olympics in the boy's event, in which he won a bronze medal. 2018 was somewhat of a breakout year for Jha, as he defeated several notable top players including Wong Chun Ting, Quadri Aruna, An Jae-hyun, and Lin Yun-ju.

=== 2019 ===
Jha won his 4th straight US National title in 2019. Jha pulled off a bronze medal at the 2019 Pan American Games in mixed doubles and singles. In the 2019 World Team Cup, Jha defeated Anton Källberg and Kristian Karlsson to lead the US past Sweden out of the group stage.

=== 2020 ===
Notable international wins for Jha in early 2020 include Uda Yukiya and Zhou Qihao. After the pandemic, Jha played in the 2020 World Cup, in which he lost in seven games to Liam Pitchford and deuce in the seventh to Chuang Chih-yuan, his favorite player growing up. In mid-2020, Jha signed with the German Bundesliga team in Ochsenhausen.

=== 2021 ===
Jha was selected to represent the United States at the Tokyo Olympics in the men's singles and team event. He spent a large amount of his final days training in the United States with his Olympic teammate at the new 888 Table Tennis Center, a club for which he is an ambassador. Jha chose not to defend his US national title in July, opting instead to prepare for the Tokyo Olympics.

At the Tokyo Olympics, Jha lost 4–2 to Russia's Kirill Skachkov in the round of 64. Team USA lost to Sweden in the first round of the team event, with Jha scoring the USA's lone victory over Mattias Falck.

=== 2024 ===
Jha won his 5th US National title on July 6, 2024. Jha was trailing Darryl Tsao in his quarterfinal match, finding himself down 0–3 in the best of 7 match. He showed the resilience of a true champion, by first bringing the match to 3–3 and then scoring the last two points of the final game, winning 11–9.

Jha secured the first men's singles win for USA at the 2024 Olympics, defeating Vladislav Ursu of Moldova 4–0 in the preliminary round, advancing to the round of 64. The next day, Jha delivered a stunning upset by defeating World No. 20 Cho Daeseong 4–2, progressing to Round 3 where he will face Panagiotis Gionis of Greece.

== Clubs ==
Kanak Jha was discovered and promoted by German trainer Stefan Feth. Later he played in Sweden and Germany.

- TTC Ruhrstadt Herne (2017–2018)
- 1. FSV Mainz 05 (2018–2019)
- TTC Zugbrücke Grenzau (2019–2020)
- TTF Liebherr Ochsenhausen (2020–2023)
- TTC Schwalbe Bergneustadt (2024–)

== Anti-doping rule violation ==
Jha served a 12 month competition ban from March 2023 to March 2024 for an anti-doping rule violation in relation to three missed tests. The ban would have commenced on the 1 December 2022 (which was commencement date of his provisional ban), however Jha broke the terms of the provisional ban by participating in an event in New York during December 2022 and was therefore denied the use of time served.

== Best results by type of tournament ==
=== Singles ===
- Pan American Table Tennis Championships: Champion (Santiago 2018)
- Pan American Games: Bronze medal (Lima 2019)
- WTT Contender: Runner-up (Skopje 2026)
- WTT Star Contender: Quarterfinals (Astana 2026)
- WTT Champions: Bronze medal (Yokohama 2025)
- Grand Smash: Round of 16 (Singapore 2025)
- Table Tennis World Cup: Round of 16 (Macau 2025)
- World Table Tennis Championships: Quarterfinals (Houston 2021)
- Olympic Games:: Round of 16 (Paris 2024)
