= Marcelo Aguirre (table tennis) =

Paraguayan table tennis player (born 1993)

Personal information
- Full name: Víctor Marcelo Aguirre Benítez
- Born: 21 January 1993 (age 33) Asunción, Paraguay
- Height: 1.74 m (5 ft 9 in)

Sport
- Sport: Table tennis
- Club: Werder Bremen
Medal record
Men's table tennis
Representing Paraguay
Pan American Games
Silver medal – second place	2015 Toronto	Team
Pan American Championships
Bronze medal – third place	2017 Cartagena de Indias	Doubles
Bronze medal – third place	2017 Cartagena de Indias	Team
Bronze medal – third place	2021 Lima	Singles
Latin American Championships
Gold medal – first place	2013 San Salvador	Singles
Latin American Table Tennis Cup
Silver medal – second place	2011 Rio de Janeiro	Singles

Víctor Marcelo Aguirre Benítez (born 21 January 1993) is a Paraguayan table tennis player who plays for Tischtennis-Bundesliga club Werder Bremen. He competed in the 2012 Summer Olympics.

== Career ==
Aguirre was born in Asunción. He won the silver medal at the inaugural 2011 Latin American Cup held in Rio de Janeiro, Brazil after being defeated by Gustavo Tsuboi from Brazil, 4–0. he previously defeated Brazil's Cazuo Matsumoto 4–1 in the semi-finals. He competed at the 2012 Summer Olympics in the Men's singles, but was defeated in the first round.
