= Gastón Alto =

Argentine table tennis player

Personal information
- Nationality: Argentina
- Born: 6 July 1985 (age 40) Mendoza, Argentina

Sport
- Sport: Table tennis
Medal record
Men's table tennis
Representing Argentina
Pan American Games
Bronze medal – third place	2023 Santiago	Doubles
Bronze medal – third place	2023 Santiago	Team
Pan American Championship
Gold medal – first place	2019 Asunción	Doubles
Gold medal – first place	2021 Lima	Doubles
Silver medal – second place	2017 Cartagena de Indias	Team
Silver medal – second place	2019 Asunción	Singles
Bronze medal – third place	2017 Cartagena de Indias	Mixed doubles
Bronze medal – third place	2018 Santiago	Doubles
Bronze medal – third place	2021 Lima	Mixed doubles

Gastón Alto (born 6 July 1985) is an Argentine table tennis player. He competed in the 2020 Summer Olympics.
