= Pan American Table Tennis Championships =

Table tennis tournament

The Pan American Table Tennis Championships is a table tennis tournament for countries in the Americas. It was first held in 2017 in Cartagena de Indias, Colombia. The tournament is a joint effort of the Latin American Table Tennis Union and the Northern American Table Tennis Union. Since its first edition, the tournament has included seven competitions; namely, men's single, double and team; women's single, double and team; and mixed doubles.

== Editions ==
Edition	Year	Location	Date	Ref.
1	2017	Cartagena de Indias, Colombia	September 11–17, 2017	
2	2018	Santiago, Chile	November 20–25, 2018	
3	2019	Asunción, Paraguay	September 3–8, 2019	
4	2021	Lima, Peru	November 13–19, 2021	
5	2022	Santiago, Chile	October 31–November 6, 2022	
6	2023	Havana, Cuba	September 10–17, 2023	
7	2024	San Salvador, El Salvador	October 13–20, 2024	
8	2025	Rock Hill, United States	October 12–19, 2025	
9	2026	Lima, Peru	October 18–25, 2026	

== Winners ==
Year	City	Team		Singles		Doubles		
Year	City	Men's	Women's	Men's	Women's	Men's	Women's	Mixed
2017	Cartagena de Indias	Brazil	Brazil	(Brazil) Hugo Calderano	(Puerto Rico) Adriana Díaz	(Brazil) Vitor Ishiy (Brazil) Eric Jouti	(Canada) Alicia Côté (Canada) Zhang Mo	(Brazil) Vitor Ishiy (Brazil) Bruna Takahashi
2018	Santiago	Brazil	Brazil	(United States) Kanak Jha	(Puerto Rico) Adriana Díaz	(Brazil) Vitor Ishiy (Brazil) Eric Jouti	(Canada) Alicia Côté (Canada) Zhang Mo	(Puerto Rico) Brian Afanador (Puerto Rico) Adriana Díaz
2019	Asunción	Brazil	United States	(Brazil) Vitor Ishiy	(United States) Lily Zhang	(Argentina) Gastón Alto (Argentina) Horacio Cifuentes	(United States) Jennifer Wu (United States) Lily Zhang	(United States) Kai Zhang (United States) Lily Zhang
2021	Lima	Brazil	Brazil	(Brazil) Hugo Calderano	(Puerto Rico) Adriana Díaz	(Argentina) Gastón Alto (Argentina) Horacio Cifuentes	(Puerto Rico) Adriana Díaz (Puerto Rico) Melanie Díaz	(Brazil) Vitor Ishiy (Brazil) Bruna Takahashi
2022	Santiago	Brazil	Brazil	(Brazil) Hugo Calderano	(Puerto Rico) Adriana Díaz	(Argentina) Gastón Alto (Argentina) Horacio Cifuentes	(United States) Amy Wang (United States) Rachel Sung	(Brazil) Vitor Ishiy (Brazil) Bruna Takahashi
2023	Havana	Brazil	United States	(Brazil) Hugo Calderano	(United States) Amy Wang	(Chile) Gustavo Gómez (Chile) Nicolas Burgos	(Puerto Rico) Adriana Díaz (Puerto Rico) Melanie Díaz	(Chile) María Paulina Vega (Chile) Nicolas Burgos
2024	San Salvador	United States	Cuba	(Brazil) Hugo Calderano	(Puerto Rico) Adriana Diaz	(Argentina) Horacio Cifuentes (Argentina) Santiago Lorenzo	(Brazil) Giulia Takahashi (Brazil) Laura Watanabe	(Brazil) Giulia Takahashi (Brazil) Guilherme Teodoro
2025	Rock Hill	Argentina	Puerto Rico	(Brazil) Hugo Calderano	(Puerto Rico) Adriana Diaz	(Brazil) Leonardo Iizuka (Brazil) Guilherme Teodoro	(Guatemala) Lucía Cordero (Guatemala) Hidalynn Zapata	(Brazil) Hugo Calderano (Brazil) Bruna Takahashi

=== Medal table ===
Updated after 2025 edition; team and doubles medals are counted as one despite the amount of players that won the medal.

2017–2025
Rank	Nation	Gold	Silver	Bronze	Total
1	Brazil	26	14	19	59
2	Puerto Rico	10	2	14	26
3	United States	9	16	16	41
4	Argentina	5	6	15	26
5	Chile	2	9	13	24
6	Canada	2	5	9	16
7	Cuba	1	2	6	9
8	Guatemala	1	0	1	2
9	Mexico	0	1	9	10
10	Paraguay	0	1	5	6
11	Ecuador	0	0	4	4
Totals (11 entries)		56	56	111	223

== See also ==
- Pan American Table Tennis Cup
- Table tennis at the Pan American Games
