= Nikhil Kumar (table tennis) =

American table tennis player

Personal information
- Born: January 1, 2003 (age 23) San Jose, California, United States

Sport
- Country: USA
- Sport: Table tennis
Medal record
Men's table tennis
Representing the United States
Pan American Games
Gold medal – first place	2019 Lima	Team

Nikhil Kumar (born January 1, 2003) is an American table tennis player. He competed in the men's singles event at the 2020 Summer Olympics held in Tokyo, Japan.

In 2019, he won the gold medal in the men's team event at the Pan American Games held in Lima, Peru.
