= Major League Table Tennis =

American professional table tennis league

- Current season, competition or edition: 4
- Sport: Table tennis
- Founded: 2023
- Country: United States
- Broadcaster: CBS Sports
- Streaming partner: https://tabletennis.tv
- Website: https://www.mltt.com/

Major League Table Tennis (MLTT) is a United States-based professional table tennis league. Founded in 2023 by entrepreneur Flint Lane, the league operates a team-based format that brings together professional and Olympic-level players to compete in franchises based in various cities throughout the United States.

According to The Guardian, MLTT is one of many factors contributing to a resurgence of interest in table tennis in the United States. MLTT and table tennis have also experienced an increase in popularity starting in 2024, primarily due to the sport's showing in the 2024 Summer Olympics and the release of the movie Marty Supreme.

MLTT has garnered media attention for its efforts to build a commercial base of support for professional table tennis in North America via franchise development, media partnerships, technological innovations, and sports wagering developments.

== Background and history ==
Founded in 2023 as a team-based professional league, MLTT was established to increase awareness of competitive table tennis in the U.S. Upon founding, MLTT established franchises for each of several major American cities and recruited players who were U.S. citizens and/or foreign nationals who had won gold medals at the Olympics or National Championships.

Prior to its 2024 announcement of new expansion teams as part of a plan to grow the game nationally, Sportico reported on how MLTT attempted to create table tennis as a commercially viable professional sport in North America.

In 2025, the league generated additional national exposure when it signed its first national multi-media rights agreement with CBS Sports. As CNBC stated, this was the first step toward increasing the visibility and distribution strategy for MLTT.

Following the signing of this initial media rights agreement with CBS Sports, MLTT began pursuing regulated sports wagering initiatives in conjunction with gaming and data-related companies. Reporting by both Sports Business Journal and Deadspin indicated that MLTT was attempting to develop itself as an emerging betting property because of the rapid speed and high frequency of matches played in table tennis.

MLTT announced it had added Graton Resort & Casino as a sponsor for the 2026–27 season. The deal brings MLTT’s total sponsor count to 11. Sponsorship revenue has grown 188% since its since its premiere.

== Competition format ==
Like other leagues that utilize a "team" model, MLTT teams compete in match series (both single and double) that feature male and female professional players from around the world—some of whom are members of their respective countries' national teams.

According to MLTT, the league emphasizes inclusive competition and ranking among all participants regardless of sex. In 2025, American Olympian Lily Zhang became the first female athlete to hold the #1 spot in the MLTT Power Rankings.

== Teams ==
As of the 2025–26 season, the league consists of 10 teams.

| East Division | Notable Players | West Division | Notable Players |
|---|---|---|---|
| Atlanta Blazers | Yuya Oshima, Rachel Sung, Quadri Aruna | Bay Area Blasters | Lily Zhang, Jinbao Ma |
| Carolina Gold Rush | Enzo Angles, Edward Ly | Chicago Wind | Emmanuel Lebesson, Robert Gardos |
| Florida Crocs | Daniel Górak | Los Angeles Spinners | Ľubomír Pištej, Aditya Sareen |
| New York Slice | Koki Niwa, Jishan Liang | Portland Paddlers | Nikhil Kumar, Jens Lundqvist |
| Princeton Revolution | Benedek Oláh, Koyo Kanamitsu | Texas Smash | João Monteiro, Amy Wang |

== Season results ==
=== MLTT Finals ===
| Season | Champion | Score | Runner-up | Venue / Location | Men's MVP | Women's MVP |
|---|---|---|---|---|---|---|
| 2023–24 | Texas Smash | 21-7 | Princeton Revolution | Loyola University, Chicago, IL | Enzo Angles | Hong Lin |
| 2024–25 | Carolina Gold Rush (table tennis) | 21-18 | Texas Smash | Saint Joseph's University in Philadelphia, Pennsylvania | Satoshi Aida / Taehyun Kim | Mo Zhang |
| 2025–26 | Portland Paddlers | 21–18 | Carolina Gold Rush | Table Tennis America in Fremont, California | Robert Gardos | Chen Sun |

=== Division winners ===
| Season | East Division Winner | West Division Winner |
|---|---|---|
| 2023–24 | Princeton Revolution | Bay Area Blasters |
| 2024–25 | Carolina Gold Rush | Texas Smash |
| 2025–26 | Carolina Gold Rush | Portland Paddlers |

== Business operations ==
As a growing professional sports organization, MLTT has attracted investments from individuals within the entrepreneurial, athletic, and Indian American business communities. India West reported that investors saw potential for MLTT to help increase the commercial appeal of table tennis in North America.

MLTT has also developed partnerships with recreational and analytical technologies related to ping pong and table tennis.

== Expansion ==
Major League Table Tennis has announced the addition of two expansion teams for the 2027 season, bringing the league's total franchise count to 12.

== Reception and media coverage ==
Media coverage of MLTT has largely centered upon the league's efforts to make table tennis more mainstream and widely accepted in the U.S., as well as to grow spectatorship for competitive table tennis events in the U.S.

The Guardian tied the rise of MLTT to increased cultural interest in table tennis in the U.S., particularly as more Americans engage recreationally and as table tennis receives greater representation in mass media.

Barron’s described MLTT as helping to take a typically fringe sport and introduce it into the larger American sports landscape.
