= Portland Paddlers =

American table tennis team

- Founded: 2023
- League: Major League Table Tennis (MLTT)
- Conference: Western Division
- Location: Portland, Oregon
- Arena: Oregon Convention Center / Viking Pavilion
- Owner: Idan, Dorian, and Ohad Levi
- Head coach: Christian Lillieroos
- Championships: 1 (2026)
- Website: mltt.com/team/portland-paddlers/

The Portland Paddlers are a professional table tennis team based in Portland, Oregon. The team competes in the Western Division of Major League Table Tennis (MLTT). Founded in 2023 as one of the league's eight inaugural franchises, the Paddlers represent the Pacific Northwest in the first professional team-based table tennis league in the United States.

== History ==
The Portland Paddlers were established in 2023 for the inaugural season of Major League Table Tennis. In September 2023, the franchise was acquired by Idan, Dorian, and Ohad Levi, owners of the international diamond firm Idor Diamonds. Idan Levi, a former member of the Israeli national table tennis team, serves as the primary lead for the ownership group.

The team frequently hosts league events at the Oregon Convention Center and the Viking Pavilion at Portland State University. In January 2026, the Paddlers recorded a dominant three-day home stand at the Oregon Convention Center, securing their position at the top of the Western Division. The franchise maintains a strategic partnership with Paddle Palace, the largest table tennis equipment distributor in North America, which serves as the team's primary training hub and fulfillment partner for the league.

== Division alignment ==
In 2025, MLTT expanded from eight to ten franchises, leading to a geographical realignment. The Chicago Wind moved to the Western Division to accommodate expansion teams in New York and Atlanta. The Seattle Spinners relocated to become the Los Angeles Spinners.

Western Division	Eastern Division
Portland Paddlers	Atlanta Blazers
Bay Area Blasters	Carolina Gold Rush
Chicago Wind	Florida Crocs
Los Angeles Spinners	New York Slice
Texas Smash	Princeton Revolution

== Roster and personnel ==
The team is led by Head Coach Christian Lillieroos, a veteran international coach and member of the USA Table Tennis Hall of Fame.

=== Current roster ===
Player	Country	Notes
Jens Lundqvist	Sweden	3x Olympian; Former World No. 19
Kang Dong-Soo	South Korea	Former South Korean National Champion
Nikhil Kumar	United States	2020 Tokyo Olympian; Acquired via trade
Hampus Nordberg	Sweden	Founding member of the franchise
Kotomi Omoda	Japan	2025 MLTT Female MVP Finalist
Sid Naresh	United States	2025 MLTT Champion; Acquired via trade
Minhyung Jee	Australia	Acquired via trade from Atlanta (Dec 2025)
Min Hyeok Kim	South Korea	Korean National Doubles Champion

== Season-by-season ==
Season	Matches	Record	Points	Division Finish	Playoffs
2023–24	22	9–13	217	3rd, West	—
2024–25	18	6–12	171	3rd, West	—
2025–26	18	16–2	260	1st, West	Champions
