= Sports in Charlotte, North Carolina =

Sports in Charlotte, North Carolina, have a long and varied history. The city is home to teams at nearly every level of American sports including the Charlotte Hornets of the National Basketball Association and Carolina Panthers of the National Football League. In addition to serving as the home base for several teams the city plays host to many events of national and international importance including the longest race in NASCAR, the annual Coca-Cola 600 and golf's Wells Fargo Championship.

== Teams and history ==
=== Professional and non-collegiate amateur ===
Club	League	Venue	Location	First season
Charlotte Hornets	NBA	Spectrum Center	Uptown Charlotte	1988–89
Carolina Panthers	NFL	Bank of America Stadium	Uptown Charlotte	1995
Charlotte FC	MLS	Bank of America Stadium	Uptown Charlotte	2022
Carolina Chaos	PLL	American Legion Memorial Stadium	Uptown Charlotte	2024
Charlotte Crown	UpShot	Bojangles' Coliseum	Coliseum Drive, Charlotte	2026
Carolina Ascent	USLSL	American Legion Memorial Stadium	Elizabeth, Charlotte	2024
Charlotte Knights	IL	Truist Field	Uptown Charlotte	1976
Charlotte Checkers	AHL	Bojangles' Coliseum	Coliseum Drive, Charlotte	2010–11
Charlotte Independence	USL1	American Legion Memorial Stadium	Uptown Charlotte	2015
Charlotte Eagles	USL2	Sportsplex at Matthews	Stonehaven, Charlotte	1993
Charlotte Lady Eagles	USLW	American Legion Memorial Stadium	Uptown Charlotte	2024
Carolina Gold Rush	MLTT	Charlotte Convention Center	Uptown Charlotte	2023

Baseball has been played at a high level in Charlotte since at least 1892 when the Charlotte Hornets debuted in a competition known as the South Atlantic League, later a team called the Charlotte Presbyterians took part in the North Carolina Association before reverting to the Hornets name and bouncing around a number of leagues until 1972. In 1976 following a short spell with no professional baseball in the city wrestling promoter Jim Crockett, Jr. brought the Charlotte O's to the Charlotte, the O's would later become the modern day Charlotte Knights.

Between 1969 and 1974 Greensboro's American Basketball Association team, the Carolina Cougars played a number of home games each season at the original Charlotte Coliseum, the team would also play games in Raleigh and Winston-Salem. It would be until 1988 that Charlotte would be awarded its first major league team in the form of the Charlotte Hornets of the NBA. The team played out of the 24,000-seat Charlotte Coliseum, known affectionately as "The Hive", and would lead the league in attendance for eight seasons before an acrimonious fall out with owner George Shinn triggered a number of events which led to the team relocating to New Orleans in 2002. However, it didn't take long for the Queen City to return to the NBA when a group led by businessman Bob Johnson, the founder of BET, was awarded a franchise which would come to be known as the Charlotte Bobcats. In 2013, eleven years after the Hornets left the city, the Bobcats, now playing at the Spectrum Center, announced the team would assume the city's beloved nickname following the rebranding of the New Orleans team as the Pelicans. Charlotte was also home to a WNBA team, the Charlotte Sting from 1988 until they folded in 2006.

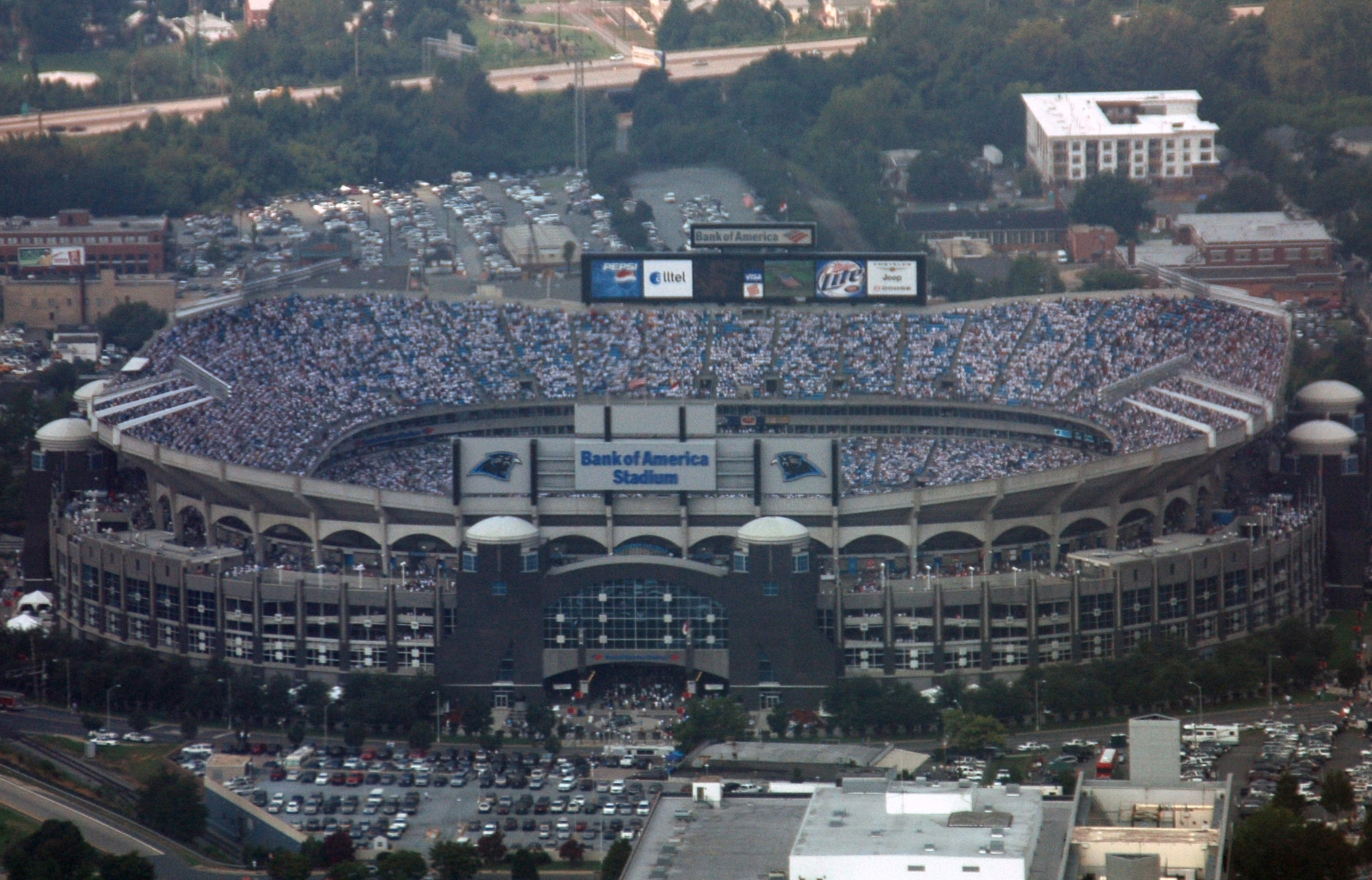
Bank of America Stadium, home of the Panthers.

The history of professional football in Charlotte began in 1967, when the American Football League staged a preseason exhibition game between the Houston Oilers and the New York Jets. Pro football returned under bizarre circumstances following the relocation of a World Football League team, the Charlotte Hornets, to the city from New York in the middle of the 1974 season. Disillusioned with life at the dilapidated Downing Stadium and saddled with heavy debt from financing renovations to the facility the ownership of the New York Stars sold the franchise to a Charlotte-based group. The Hornets played out of American Legion Memorial Stadium and were a moderate success on the field and in the stands but struggled financially and eventually shuttered operations after an abbreviated 1975 season when the entire league shut down. Professional football would return to Charlotte in 1992 in the form of the Charlotte Rage, an Arena Football League team that played out of the Coliseum. The Rage would qualify for the playoffs twice (in 1993 & 1994) before closing in 1996. The Arena League would return to Charlotte in 2003 when the Carolina Cobras relocated from Raleigh. The Cobras short tenure in Charlotte is memorable for appearances by future Pro Bowler Rob Bironas and future WWE wrestler Thaddeus Bullard, better known as Titus O'Neil.

In 1987 businessman Jerry Richardson announced his intentions to bring the National Football League to the Carolinas with a bid centered in Charlotte. The Richardson-lead group staged several NFL exhibitions around the Carolinas and in 1991 formally filed an expansion bid which was unanimously approved by the NFL's 28 owners making the Carolina Panthers the 29th NFL franchise. The Panthers spent the 1995 season south of the border at Clemson's Memorial Stadium while Bank of America Stadium in Uptown was being prepared for the team's 1996 season. To date the Panthers have appeared in two Super Bowls, Super Bowl XXXVIII and Super Bowl 50, and lay claim to four conference championships and six division championships.

Since 2005 Charlotte has been home to a women's football team called the Carolina Queens. The Queens play home games at Hopewell High's stadium in Huntersville.

Despite being a warm-weather, Southern city, Charlotte has a long ice hockey history that dates back to 1956 when the original Charlotte Checkers were formed and began play in the Eastern Hockey League. The Checkers would play in the EHL for several seasons before moving to the more geographically-friendly Southern Hockey League where the team would win two championships before folding with the rest of the league in 1977. It would be 17-years before the sport would return to the city at the professional level with the formation of an ECHL team named in honor of the original Charlotte hockey team. The second version of the Checkers would take up residence at the original Coliseum (then known as Independence Arena) and would quickly become a success by winning the Kelly Cup in 1996. The team moved to the Spectrum Center in 2005. In 2010 the Checkers would move to the American Hockey League and become the top affiliate of Raleigh's National Hockey League team, the Carolina Hurricanes. In 2015 the Checkers moved back to the Coliseum.

Throughout the years Charlotte has been home to a number of soccer teams, and is currently home of the Charlotte Eagles of the USL League Two, their sister team, the Charlotte Lady Eagles of the USL W-League, and the Charlotte Independence of the United Soccer League. Both Eagles teams have won a number of championships at the lower-levels of American soccer. In 1981 Charlotte's American Soccer League team, the Carolina Lightnin', won the league championship before a sold-out Memorial Stadium when they defeated New York United 2–1. Major League Soccer awarded an expansion team to Charlotte in 2019 that is set to begin play in 2021.

Lacrosse is a sport with a relatively short history in Charlotte but one that is experiencing growth following the formation of two professional lacrosse teams. The Charlotte Hounds are a field lacrosse team that plays in Major League Lacrosse, the top level of the sport in the United States, out of Memorial Stadium. The Hounds began play in 2012 and were founded by Jim McPhilliamy. Charlotte's other lacrosse team, the Charlotte Copperheads, plays the indoor version of the game, box lacrosse, in the Professional Lacrosse League.

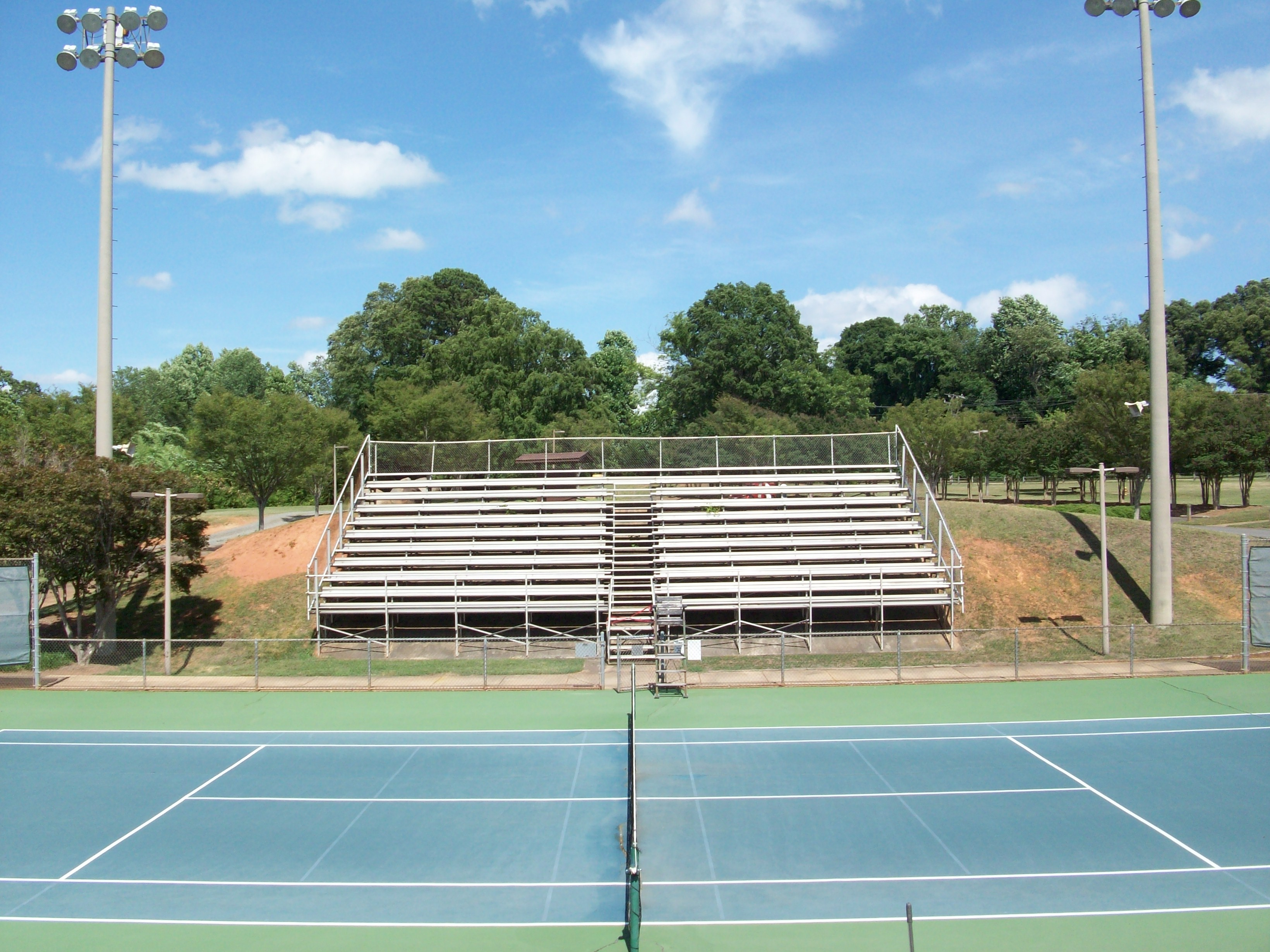
Center Court at the Jeff Adams Tennis Center.

Tennis is played at several venues throughout Charlotte by both individuals and clubs at the recreational and competitive levels. Charlotte's most prominent tennis venue is the 13-court Jeff Adams Tennis Center at Renaissance Park.

Charlotte is home to one of North Carolina's oldest rugby union organizations, the Charlotte Rugby Club, or the Olde Originals. CRC was founded in 1971 by former college rugby players and is based at the Skillbeck Athletic Grounds in Coulwood, a neighborhood in the northwestern portion of the city.

The Charlotte Roller Girls organization is a flat-track roller derby club that was founded by several local women in 2006 and plays out of the Grady Cole Center.

Since 1931, Jim Crockett Promotions has been a full-fledged professional wrestling performer, based in the North Carolina, South Carolina, and Virginia states, and has been called Mid-Atlantic Wrestling. National Wrestling Alliance, World Championship Wrestling, WWE has big matches, and many pay-per-view event. Many professional wrestlers living.

=== Collegiate ===
Team	Division	Primary Conference	Location	Varsity Teams
Charlotte 49ers	NCAA I	Conference USA	University City, Charlotte	17
Davidson Wildcats	NCAA I	Atlantic 10	Davidson, North Carolina	19
Queens Royals	NCAA I	A-Sun Conference	Myers Park, Charlotte	19
JCSU Golden Bulls	NCAA II	CIAA	Biddleville, Charlotte	13
Johnson & Wales Wildcats	USCAA	Independent	Uptown Charlotte	5

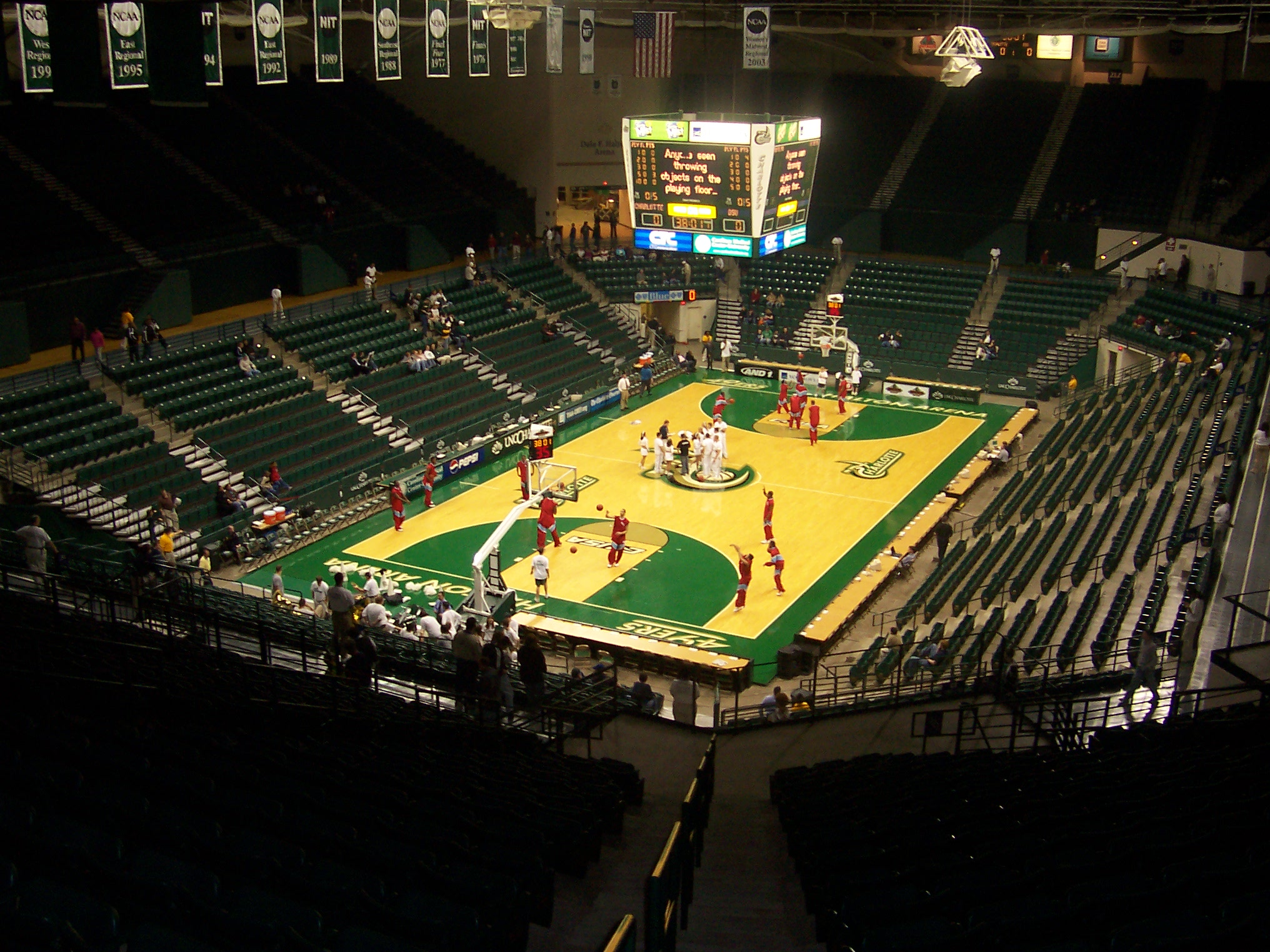
Dale F. Halton Arena, UNC Charlotte.

Mecklenburg is home to five collegiate athletic programs and is where the offices of the Big South Conference are based.

The University of North Carolina at Charlotte, founded in 1946 as the Charlotte Center of the University of North Carolina, is the home of 17 varsity teams known as the Charlotte 49ers. Charlotte has full Division I status and is a member of Conference USA and has participated in the NCAA tournament 11 times and appeared in 1 Bowl Game. UNC Charlotte is one of the largest public universities in the state of North Carolina.

Davidson College, founded in 1837 and based in the eponymous north Mecklenburg town, is the oldest of these institutions and is the home of the Wildcats. A full NCAA Division I program, Davidson is a member of the Atlantic 10 Conference and fields 19 varsity teams.

Charlotte and Davidson compete in men's basketball for the Hornets' Nest Trophy. Charlotte leads the all-time series 29-17

Queens University of Charlotte is a private, Presbyterian school based in the Charlotte neighborhood of Myers Park. Queens began life in 1857 as the Charlotte Female Institute. In the 1980s Queens began admitting male students. The Queens Royals play in the South Atlantic Conference at the NCAA Division II level.

Johnson C. Smith University is an HBCU located near Uptown in Biddleville. JCSU was founded in 1867 and the Golden Bulls play at Division II level as a member of the Central Intercollegiate Athletic Association.

A newcomer, the Charlotte campus of Johnson & Wales University was established in 2004. The JWU Wildcats play men's basketball and women's volleyball as independent members of the United States Collegiate Athletic Association.

The annual CIAA Basketball Tournament was held in Charlotte from 2006-2020. The tournament attracted over 100,000 fans and spectators and had a $55 million economic impact on the city. The sustained success of the tournament led to the CIAA's decision to relocate its headquarters from Hampton, VA to Charlotte in August 2015.

The city is also the home of the National Junior College Athletic Association (NJCAA) headquarters. The NJCAA is the second-largest national intercollegiate athletic organization in the United States with over 500 member schools in 43 states.

=== High schools ===
Charlotte-Mecklenburg's high school teams are aligned into the following conferences as assigned by the North Carolina High School Athletic Association.

Mecka 4A	So. Meck 8 4A	Southwestern 4A
Hopewell Titans	Ardrey Kell Knights	Butler Bulldogs
Hough Huskies	Berry Cardinals	East Meck Eagles
Kannapolis Wonders	Charlotte Catholic Cougars	Garinger Wildcats
Mallard Creek Mavericks	Harding Rams	Independence Patriots
North Meck Vikings	Olympic Trojans	Myers Park Mustangs
Jay M. Robinson Bulldogs	Providence Panthers	Porter Ridge Pirates
West Charlotte Lions	South Meck Sabres	Rocky River Ravens
Vance Cougars	West Meck Hawks	

Mecklenburg County has long been a superpower in North Carolina high school sports dating back to Garinger's (then known as Charlotte High School) multiple football championships in the 1910s. Garinger in its historic and present day forms would go on to become the earliest of the Charlotte powers in the first half of the 20th century before seeing its fortunes fade in the latter half. Garinger most recently claimed a state championship with its 1989 boys basketball team.

The late 20th and early 21st centuries were marked by the rise of Butler, Independence, and West Charlotte as state football powers. West Charlotte's Lions dominated the state football scene between the mid-80s and 90s, a period during which they won five championships in a ten-year span. The late-90s saw Independence begin a 107-game winning streak that included seven consecutive state championships under coach Tom Knotts. Independence's streak would last until 2007 when Cincinnati's Elder High School defeated the Patriots 41–34 at Nippert Stadium. Butler and Mallard Creek have recently made appearances in state championship games with Butler claiming three titles.

Garinger and West Charlotte each have five state basketball championships while South Meck has four.

== Motorsports ==
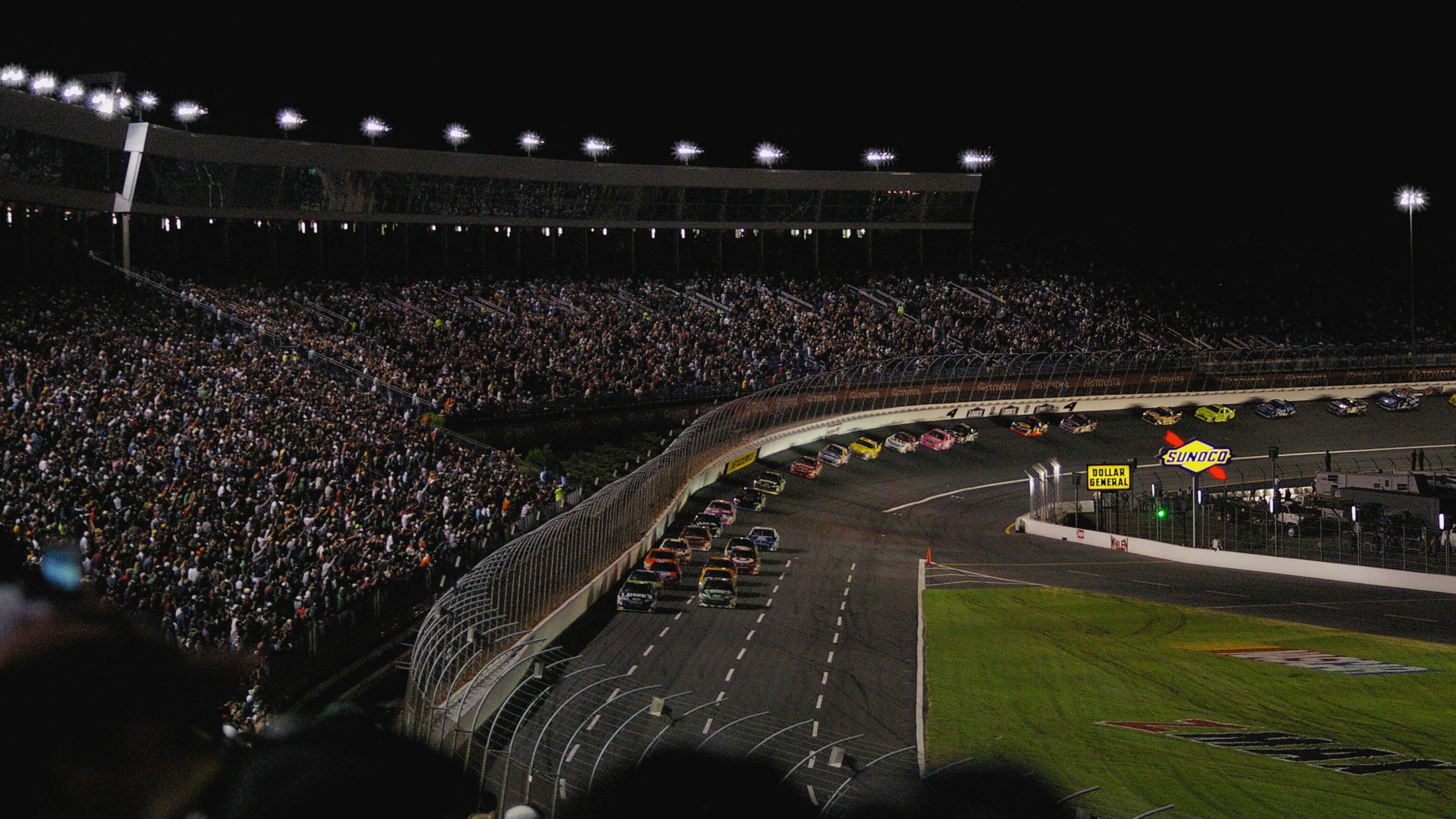
Charlotte Motor Speedway.

Along with Indianapolis, Charlotte is considered one of the hubs of American motorsports with most NASCAR teams and several open wheel and sports car teams calling Charlotte and the area surrounding it home.

Uptown Charlotte is home of the NASCAR Hall of Fame and the now defunct Charlotte Speedway was the site of the first NASCAR Strictly Stock (a precursor to the modern NASCAR Cup Series) race on June 19, 1949, Bob Flock won the pole and Jim Roper was declared the winner after Glenn Dunaway's car failed post-race inspection.

Charlotte previously held the Indy Racing League (now IndyCar Series) from 1997 to 1999, the race was known as the VisionAire 500K, during the 1999 race, three spectators were killed when debris from a crash on the track went into the grandstands. The race was stopped and canceled, and the event was removed from the Indy Racing League schedule.

Since then a number of Charlotte-area venues have played host to NASCAR's top series including Metrolina Speedway on the Metrolina Fairgrounds in Charlotte, and Charlotte Motor Speedway in Concord. CMS hosts two Cup Series events each year: The Coca-Cola 600 in the spring, the longest race of the year, and the Bank of America 400 in the fall, a Chase race, the fall race was previously held on the track's infield road course, and CMS held the All-Star Race from 1985, and again from 1987 to 2019.

== Events ==
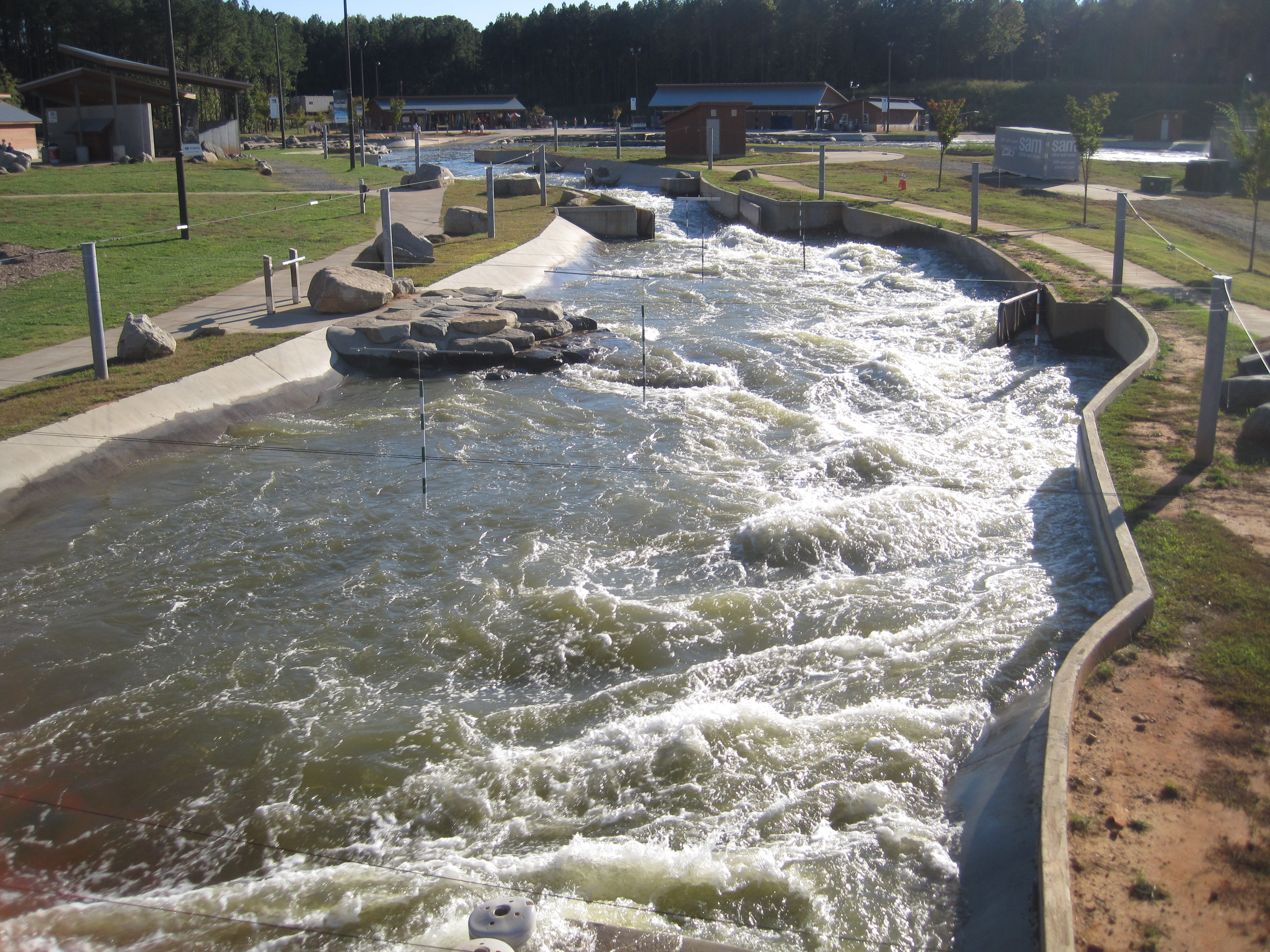
U.S. National Whitewater Center.

As with all of North Carolina, Charlotte is a hotbed of golf and hosts annual events across several tours. The PGA Tour stops in Charlotte once a year for the Wells Fargo Championship at the Quail Hollow Club and in 2017 the club will host the 99th PGA Championship. River Run Country Club in Davidson plays host the Web.com Tour's Chiquita Classic and Raintree Country Club is the home of the Symetra Classic, an event on the LPGA's developmental Symetra Tour.

The U.S. National Whitewater Center is an official United States Olympic Committee training site for whitewater slalom racing and has hosted Olympic team qualifying events.

The Belk Bowl is played every December in Charlotte and features teams from the Atlantic Coast Conference and Southeastern Conference.

Brooklandwood in the nearby Union County town of Mineral Springs is the site of the Queens Cup Steeplechase, one of steeplechase horse racing's major annual events. The program consists of several races, and is held the last Saturday of April and also features a Jack Russell Terrier judging contest. This event ran from 1995 to 2023. The Queen's City Polo Cup is scheduled to replace this event in 2026.

Several cycling events take place in Charlotte including the Presbyterian Hospital Invitational Criterium and 24-Hours of Booty.

== Venues ==
=== Present ===
Venue	Location	Capacity	Owner	Environment	Year built
Bank of America Stadium	Uptown Charlotte	73,778	Carolina Panthers	Open air, artificial turf	1996
Spectrum Center	Uptown Charlotte	20,200	City of Charlotte	Indoor arena	2005
American Legion Memorial Stadium	Elizabeth, Charlotte	16,000	Mecklenburg Parks & Rec.	Open air, natural grass	1936
Bojangles' Coliseum	Coliseum Drive, Charlotte	9,605	City of Charlotte	Indoor arena	1955
Jerry Richardson Stadium	University City, Charlotte	15,314	UNC Charlotte	Open air, artificial turf	2012
Grady Cole Center	Elizabeth, Charlotte	3,000	Mecklenburg Parks & Rec.	Indoor arena	1954
Charlotte Motor Speedway	Concord, North Carolina	140,000+	Speedway Motorsports	Open air, asphalt	1960
Dale F. Halton Arena	University City, Charlotte	9,105	UNC Charlotte	Indoor arena	1996
John M. Belk Arena	Davidson, North Carolina	5,223	Davidson College	Indoor arena	1989
Transamerica Field	University City, Charlotte	4,000	UNC Charlotte	Open air, natural grass	1996
Richardson Stadium	Davidson, North Carolina	6,000	Davidson College	Open air, artificial turf	1923
Irwin Belk Complex	Biddleville, Charlotte	4,500	Johnson C. Smith University	Open air, natural grass	2003
Winthrop Coliseum	Rock Hill, South Carolina	6,100	Winthrop University	Indoor arena	1982
Concord Speedway	Midland, North Carolina	8,000	Concord Speedway	Open air, asphalt	1956?
Truist Field	Uptown Charlotte	10,000	Charlotte Knights	Open air, natural grass	2014
Mecklenburg County Sportsplex	Matthews, North Carolina	3,000	Mecklenburg County; Town of Matthews	Open air, natural grass	2016

=== Defunct ===
Venue	Location	Capacity	Owner	Environment	Closed	Reason
Knights Stadium	Fort Mill, South Carolina	10,002	York County, South Carolina	Open air, natural grass	2015	Replaced
Charlotte Coliseum	Eagle Lake, Charlotte	24,000	City of Charlotte	Indoor arena	2005	Replaced
Jim Crockett Park	Dilworth, Charlotte	5,000	Crockett Family	Open air, natural grass	1985	Arson
Metrolina Speedway	Metrolina Fairgrounds, Charlotte	10,000	Metrolina Fair	Open air, dirt	1990s	Abandoned
Belk Gymnasium	University City, Charlotte	3,000	UNC Charlotte	Indoor arena	1996	Converted
Charlotte Speedway	Charlotte	?	?	Open air, dirt	1957	Closed
