= Motorsport (disambiguation) =

A motorsport is a competitive sporting event which involves the use of motorised vehicles.

Motorsport or motor sport may also refer to:

== Arts, entertainment, and media ==
- Motor Sport (magazine), first issued in 1924 in the United Kingdom and published by Motor Sport Magazine Limited
- "MotorSport" (song), a 2017 song by Migos, Nicki Minaj and Cardi B from the 2018 album Culture 2
- Motorsport.tv, a Pan-European digital television channel
- Motorsport.com, a website specializing in motor racing news
- Motorsport Network, American media and technology company

== Sports ==
- Motorsport in Australia
- Motorsport in Canada
- Motorsport in the United Kingdom
- Motorsport in the United States
- Motor sport in New Zealand
