= University, North Carolina =

University, North Carolina may refer to:

- University of North Carolina, a multi-campus public university system, North Carolina, U.S.
- University City, Charlotte, North Carolina, a community in Mecklenburg County, North Carolina, U.S.
- University, Orange County, North Carolina, an unincorporated settlement in Orange County, North Carolina, U.S.
