= Sports in Atlanta =

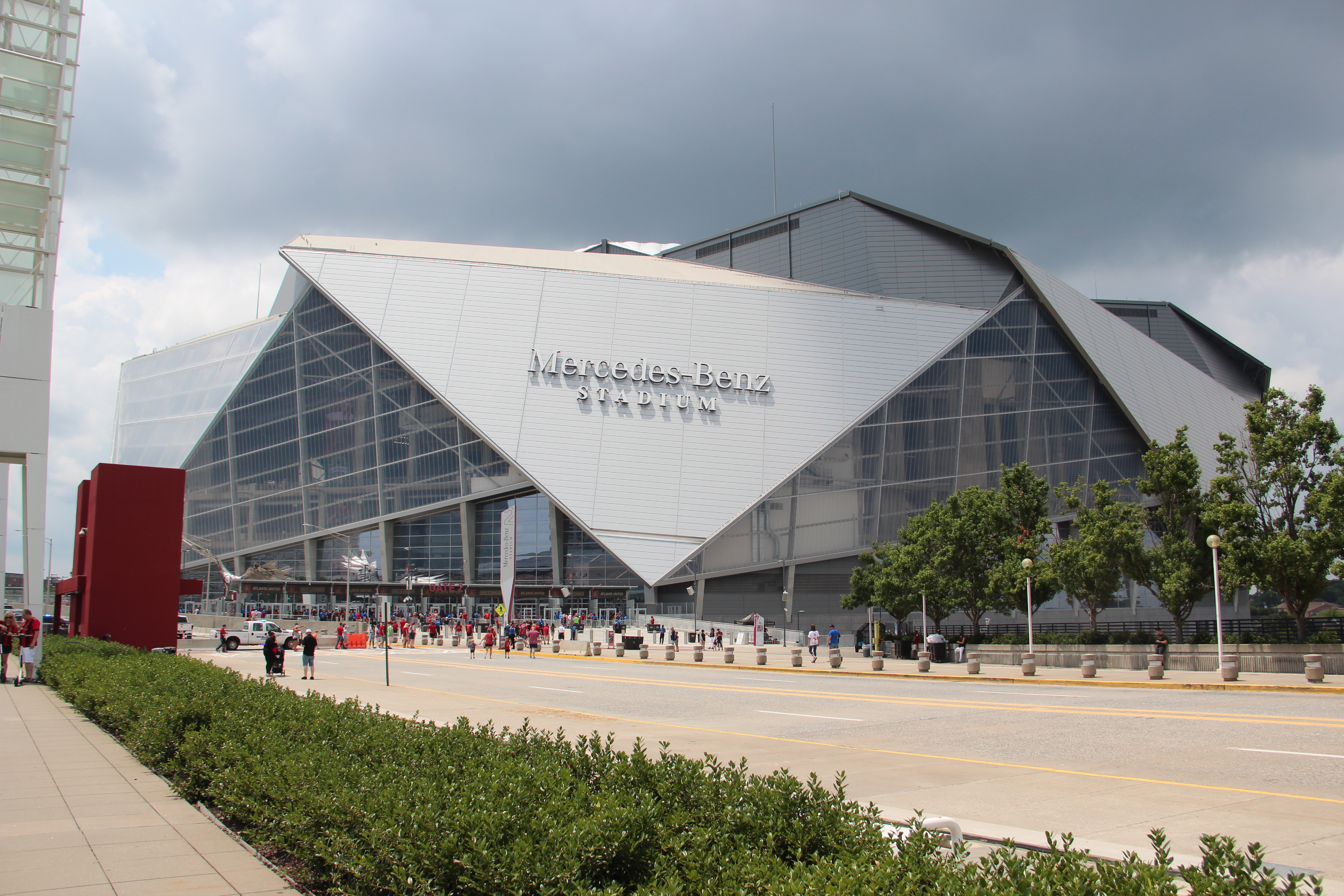
Mercedes-Benz Stadium is the home stadium of the Atlanta Falcons and Atlanta United.

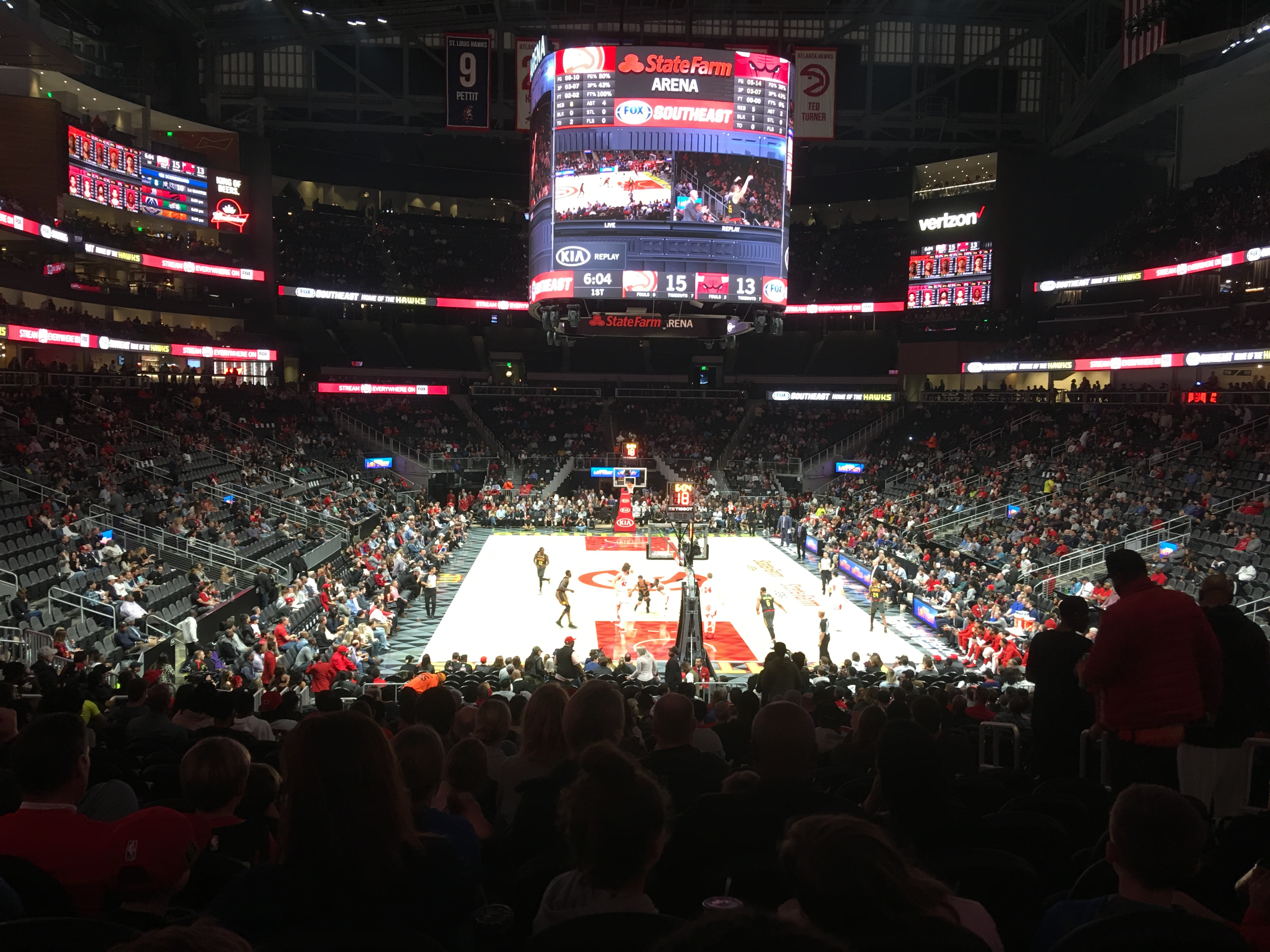
State Farm Arena, the home venue of the Atlanta Hawks.

Sports in Atlanta has a rich history, including the oldest on-campus NCAA Division I football stadium, Bobby Dodd Stadium, built in 1913 by the students of Georgia Tech. Atlanta also played host to the second intercollegiate football game in the South, played between the A&M College of Alabama (now Auburn University) and the University of Georgia in Piedmont Park in 1892; this game is now called the Deep South's Oldest Rivalry. The city hosts college football's annual Chick-fil-A Peach Bowl and the Peachtree Road Race, the world's largest 10 km race. Atlanta was the host city for the Centennial 1996 Summer Olympics, and Downtown Atlanta's Centennial Olympic Park was built for and commemorates the games.

Atlanta and its surrounding metropolitan area is home to professional franchises from four major professional sports leagues: the Atlanta Braves of Major League Baseball, the Atlanta Hawks of the National Basketball Association, the Atlanta Falcons of the National Football League, and Atlanta United FC of Major League Soccer. In women's major leagues, the city hosts the Atlanta Dream of the Women's National Basketball Association and will host Atlanta City FC of the National Women's Soccer League starting in 2028. Atlanta also has top-level teams in the Georgia Swarm of the National Lacrosse League, Atlanta Rhinos of the North American Rugby League, Rugby ATL of Major League Rugby, and most recently the Atlanta Vibe of the Pro Volleyball Federation.

Atlanta was previously home to the Atlanta Flames (1972–1980) and the Atlanta Thrashers (1999–2011) of the National Hockey League. The Atlanta Gladiators are a professional minor league ice hockey team based in Duluth, Georgia. The Gladiators play in the South Division of the ECHL's Eastern Conference. They play their home games at Gas South Arena, approximately 22 miles (35 km) northeast of Atlanta. There was also the Atlanta Blaze (2016-2019) of the now defunct Major League Lacrosse. (1999-2020)

== Professional teams ==
=== Major professional league teams ===
The following teams compete in a major professional league.

Club	Sport	League	Venue (capacity)	First season	Moved to Atlanta	Titles in Atlanta
Atlanta Braves	Baseball	MLB	Truist Park (41,500)	1871	1966	2 (1995, 2021)
Atlanta Hawks	Basketball	NBA	State Farm Arena (18,100)	1946–47	1968	—
Atlanta Falcons	Football	NFL	Mercedes-Benz Stadium (71,000)	1966	N/A	—
Atlanta United FC	Soccer	MLS	Mercedes-Benz Stadium (71,000)	2017	N/A	1 (2018)

=== Other highest-level professional league teams ===
The following teams compete in a highest-level professional league.

Club	Sport	League	Venue (capacity)	First season	Moved to Atlanta	Titles in Atlanta
Atlanta Dream	Basketball	WNBA	Gateway Center Arena (3,500)	2008	N/A	—
Atlanta City FC	Soccer	NWSL	Mercedes-Benz Stadium	2028	N/A	0
Georgia Swarm	Box lacrosse	NLL	Gas South Arena	2004	2016	1 (2017)
Atlanta Vibe	Volleyball	MLV	Gas South Arena	2024	N/A	—
LOVB Atlanta	Volleyball	LOVB	Gateway Center Arena	2024	N/A	—
Atlanta Drive Club	Golf	TGL	Sofi Center (1,500)	2025	N/A	1 (2025)
Atlanta United 2	Soccer	MLSNP	Fifth Third Bank Stadium	2018	N/A	0
Gwinnett Stripers	Baseball	IL	Gwinnett Field	2009	N/A	0
College Park Skyhawks	Basketball	NBAGL	Gateway Center Arena	2019	N/A	0
Atlanta Gladiators	Ice hockey	ECHL	Gas South Arena	2003	N/A	0

=== Baseball ===
The Atlanta Braves baseball team has been Atlanta's Major League Baseball franchise since 1966. The team was founded in 1871 in Boston, Massachusetts as a National Association club, making it the oldest continuously operating sports franchise in North American sports. The club played 82 seasons in Boston (1871–1952) and used several nicknames, including Braves. The Braves moved to Milwaukee in 1953, and played as the Milwaukee Braves from 1953 to 1965. In Atlanta, the Braves won the 1995 World Series, and had an unprecedented run of 14 straight divisional championships from 1991 to 2005. They achieved their 4th overall title (2nd in Atlanta) after winning the 2021 World Series. Atlanta has also played host to the three of Major League Baseball's All Star Games to include the 1972 Major League Baseball All-Star Game held at Atlanta–Fulton County Stadium, the 2000 Major League Baseball All-Star Game held at Turner Field, and the 2025 Major League Baseball All-Star Game held at Truist Park.

The Braves' Triple-A affiliate, the Gwinnett Stripers of the International League, has been based in the Gwinnett County suburb of Lawrenceville since 2009. Before the Braves moved to Atlanta, the Atlanta Crackers were Atlanta's professional baseball team from 1901 until their last season in 1965. They won 17 league championships in the minor leagues. The Atlanta Black Crackers (I) and Atlanta Black Crackers (II) were Atlanta's Negro league teams from 1919 until 1949.

=== American football ===
The Falcons have been Atlanta's National Football League franchise since 1966. The Falcons recently completed construction of a new retractable roof stadium, Mercedes Benz Stadium, playing their first pre-season game there on August 26, 2017. They have won the division title six times in two different divisions (NFC West and current NFC South), and two conference championships, going on to lose to the Denver Broncos in Super Bowl XXXIII (following the 1998 season) and the New England Patriots in Super Bowl LI (following the 2016 season). Super Bowl XXVIII, XXXIV, LIII, and LXII were hosted in Atlanta with the first two taking place in the now-demolished Georgia Dome.

The Alliance of American Football's Atlanta franchise, the Atlanta Legends, began play in 2019. They played at Georgia State Stadium, but the league's football operations were reportedly suspended and the team folded.

=== Basketball ===
The Atlanta Hawks of the National Basketball Association have played in Atlanta since the 1968–69 NBA season. The franchise began in 1946 as the Buffalo Bisons, briefly playing in Buffalo, New York, before moving to Moline, Illinois and becoming the Tri-Cities Blackhawks. The team moved to Milwaukee in 1951, then to St. Louis in 1955, where it won its sole NBA Championship (as the St. Louis Hawks). A decade after winning the NBA title, in 1968, the Hawks came to Atlanta. The Hawks have won six division titles and 18 playoff series since moving to Atlanta.

The Hawks' NBA G League affiliate, the College Park Skyhawks, is based in College Park (immediately southwest of Atlanta).

The Atlanta Dream are a 2008 expansion team in the Women's National Basketball Association. From their inception until the 2016 season, the Dream shared Philips Arena with their NBA counterpart; however, the Dream moved to McCamish Pavilion on the campus of Georgia Tech due to renovations of Philips Arena conflicting with the WNBA schedule during the 2017 and 2018 seasons. After one more season in State Farm Arena (after the Philips was renamed during the renovations), they moved their home games to the new Gateway Center Arena for the 2020 season.

=== Soccer ===
Atlanta was selected in April 2014 for an expansion team to join Major League Soccer (MLS) and begin play in 2017. The team, operated by Falcons owner Arthur Blank (co-founder of The Home Depot), shares Mercedes-Benz Stadium with the Falcons and is named Atlanta United FC. Atlanta United won the MLS Cup in 2018. In 2018, Atlanta United launched its reserve team, Atlanta United 2, in the USL Championship.

The Atlanta Chiefs competed in the National Professional Soccer League (NPSL) in 1967 and the North American Soccer League (NASL) from 1968 to 1973 and again from 1979 to 1981. Founded in 1967 as a charter member of the NPSL, the club was the brainchild of Dick Cecil, then Vice President of the Atlanta Braves baseball franchise who was the Chiefs' owners. The Chiefs capped off the 1968 season by defeating the San Diego Toros in the NASL Final 1968 at Atlanta Stadium in front of approximately 15,000 spectators. In doing so, they became both the first champions of the NASL as well as the first major professional sports franchise in Atlanta to win a championship. For the 1973 season, the team played as the Atlanta Apollos.

The original Atlanta Beat of the Women's United Soccer Association (WUSA, 2001–2003) was the only team to reach the playoffs in each of the league's three seasons. The new Atlanta Beat made its debut in Women's Professional Soccer (WPS) in April 2010, and the following month played its first game in the new soccer-specific stadium that it shared with Kennesaw State University in the northern suburb of Kennesaw. WPS played its final season in 2011 and folded just before its scheduled 2012 season; the Beat folded along with the league and are not part of WPS' effective successor, the current National Women's Soccer League.

Atlanta was previously home to the Atlanta Silverbacks of the North American Soccer League and the Atlanta Silverbacks Women in the W-League. In 2007, the men's Silverbacks had their best season, advancing to the USL Finals against the Seattle Sounders. The women's Silverbacks won the league title in 2011. Both teams briefly ceased operations after the 2015 season, the men's team due to lack of ownership in the NASL and the women's team because the W-League ceased operations. New ownership came to the rescue prior to the 2016 seasons, as both have resurfaced in the NPSL and WPSL, respectively.

The United States Soccer Federation moved their headquarters to Atlanta in 2023. The new training center is located in Fayette County and is named after Arthur Blank to honor his help in moving their headquarters.

FIFA announced that Mercedes-Benz Stadium would host multiple matches during the 2026 FIFA World Cup.

Atlanta City FC will join the National Women's Soccer League (NWSL) as an expansion team in 2028 and will play at Mercedes-Benz Stadium.

=== Ice hockey ===
In 1972, The OMNI became home to the Atlanta Flames of the National Hockey League. The Flames qualified for the playoffs six times in eight seasons, but failed to win a playoff series. In 1980, the team departed for Calgary, Alberta, where it currently plays as the Calgary Flames. Then in 1999, the NHL returned to Atlanta in the form of the Expansion Atlanta Thrashers, which played in Philips Arena. The Thrashers won the Southeast Division in 2006–07, but were swept in their only playoff appearance. After eleven seasons in Atlanta, in 2011, the Thrashers moved to Winnipeg, Manitoba, and became the current Winnipeg Jets. Today, the Atlanta fanbase and market is served by the Nashville Predators.

From 1992 to 1996, Atlanta was home to the short-lived Atlanta Knights, an International Hockey League team. Their inaugural season was excellent for a new team, and was only bested by their sophomore season in which they won the championship Turner Cup. In 1996, they moved to Quebec City, Quebec, and became the Quebec Rafales.

Since the Thrashers moved to Winnipeg, their former ECHL affiliate in Duluth, Georgia, the Atlanta Gladiators, became the area's only professional hockey team. The Gladiators moved to Gwinnett County in 2003 after seven seasons as the Mobile Mysticks, and has won three division championships, and a conference championship since 2006.

=== Tennis ===
Every July, Atlanta hosts the Atlanta Open, an ATP Tour 250 men's tennis tournament. The event is part of the US Open Series and serves as an important tune-up to the US Open.

The Atlanta Blazers are a professional table tennis team based in Atlanta, Georgia. The team competes in the East Division of Major League Table Tennis (MLTT). Established in 2025, the Blazers joined the league as an expansion franchise for its third season.

=== Box Lacrosse ===
In 2015, Atlanta became the furthest south major league box lacrosse team in the National Lacrosse League (NLL) when John Arlotta moved the Minnesota Swarm franchise from St. Paul, Minnesota, to Duluth, Georgia, and renamed the team to the Georgia Swarm. In the four (full) seasons in the Atlanta market, they have made the playoffs each year, including winning the National Lacrosse League Cup in 2017.

=== Rugby union ===
Atlanta is home to many rugby union clubs. On September 21, 2018, Major League Rugby, the top-level rugby union league in North America, announced that Atlanta was one of the expansion teams joining the league for the 2020 season. The team name Rugby ATL was revealed on February 26, 2019. In 2023, the team relocated to Los Angeles.

Other rugby union teams include the Atlanta Harlequins, who ranked number two in the United States in Division 1 for women's clubs under USA Rugby, the governing body for rugby in the United States. From 2014 to 2016, the suburb of Kennesaw hosted the USA Women's Sevens, an event in the annual World Rugby Women's Sevens Series in the sevens version of the sport, but that event has since moved, first to Las Vegas and now to Greater Los Angeles.

=== Volleyball ===
Atlanta is home to the Atlanta Vibe, a member of the Pro Volleyball Federation (PVF). Atlanta was named as the third PVF franchise on February 16, 2023, and later signed the first athlete to the league in Kentucky Wildcats' standout Leah Edmond. The team's official name and branding was announced on August 4, 2023, at the AVP Tour, Atlanta. The team, owned by Rally Volleyball's Colleen Craig - the league's only current female majority owner - played its inaugural season in 2024 at Gas South Arena in Duluth, Ga.

== Other teams ==
Club	Sport	League	Venue	Founded	Titles
Atlanta Fire	Cricket	MiLC	Param Veers Cricket Field	2020	1 (2025)
Atlanta Lightning	Cricket	MiLC	Atlanta Cricket Field	2022	0
Atlanta Copperheads	Rugby league	USA Rugby League		2018	0
Atlanta Hustle	Ultimate	UFA	Atlanta Silverbacks Park	2015	0
Atlanta Empire	Women's American football	X League	Gas South Arena	2020	0
Atlanta Soul	Ultimate	Premier Ultimate League		2018	0

=== Field Lacrosse ===
In 2016, Atlanta fielded its first professional field Lacrosse team in Major League Lacrosse. The expansion franchise, Atlanta Blaze, took to the field at Kennesaw State University's Fifth Third Bank Stadium. The team made its first MLL playoff appearance in the 2018 season. The Blaze later ceased operations in 2020.

=== Rugby league ===
Atlanta Rhinos, formerly of the USA Rugby League, now in the professional North American Rugby League represent the city at rugby league. The club was formerly linked with English Super League club the Leeds Rhinos.

=== Other sports ===
In the Arena Football League, the Georgia Force played in Philips Arena and Infinite Energy Arena in suburban Duluth since the franchise relocated from Nashville in 2002 until 2012.

The Atlanta Kookaburras are a successful Australian rules football club that compete in men's and women's divisions in the MAAFL and SEAFL and USAFL National Championships.

Atlanta is home to two of the nation's Gaelic football clubs, the Na Fianna and Clan na nGael Ladies' and Men's Gaelic Football Clubs. Both are members of the North American County Board, a branch of the Gaelic Athletic Association, the worldwide governing body of Gaelic games.

== College sports ==
Atlanta has a rich tradition in collegiate athletics, with two NCAA Division I programs in the city and a third in the metropolitan area, as well as one NCAA Division III program.

=== Georgia Tech ===
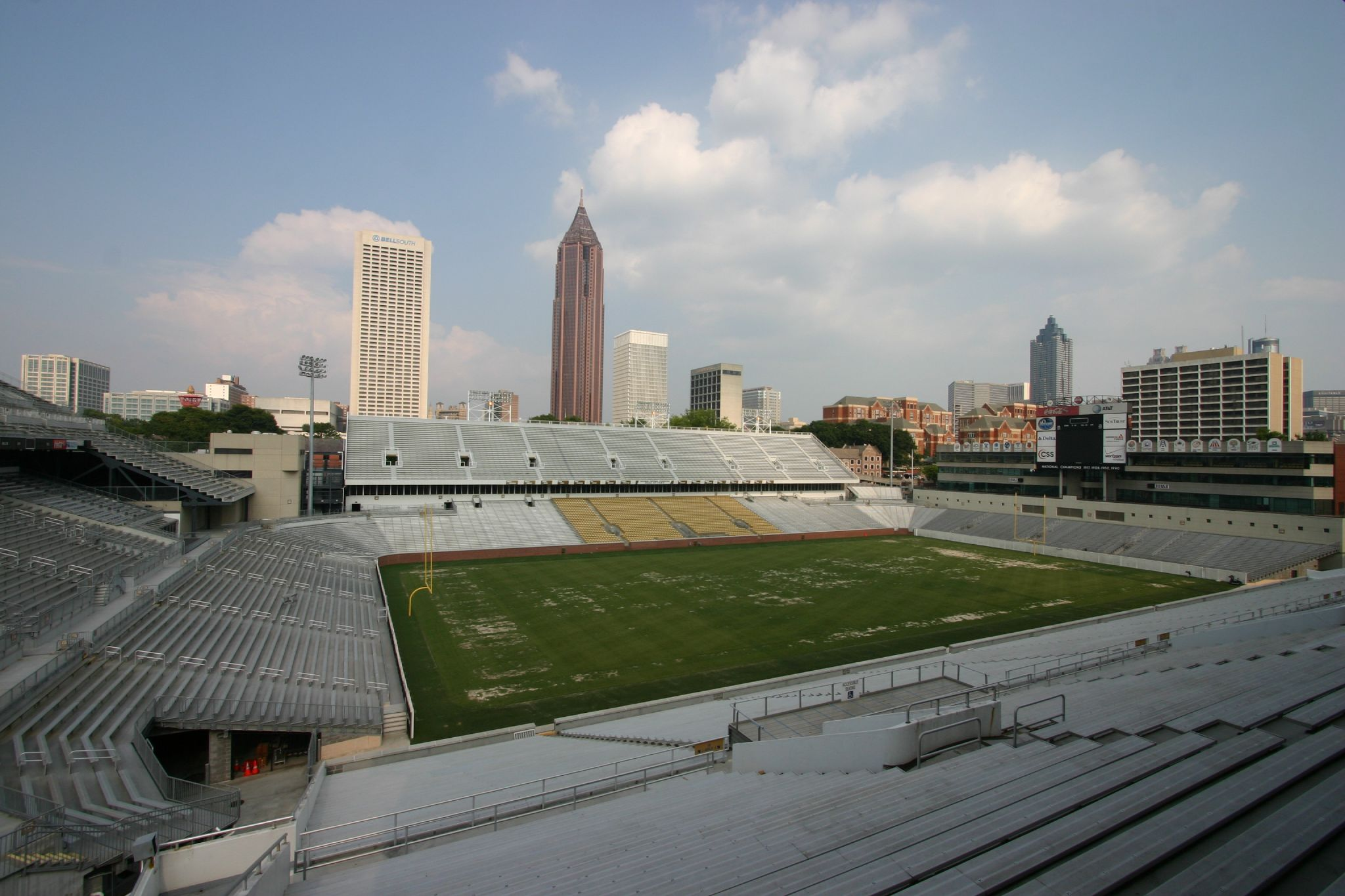
Bobby Dodd Stadium

The Georgia Tech Yellow Jackets participate in 17 intercollegiate sports, including football and basketball. Tech competes in the Atlantic Coast Conference, and is home to Bobby Dodd Stadium, the oldest continuously used on campus site for college football in the southern United States, and oldest currently in Division I FBS. The stadium was built in 1913 by students of Georgia Tech.

=== Georgia State ===
The Georgia State Panthers, representing Georgia State University, field varsity teams in 16 sports, also including football and basketball. GSU, like Georgia Tech located within Atlanta proper, is currently in its second stint as a member of the Sun Belt Conference. It had been a charter member of the league in 1976, but left in 1981. In 2013, GSU returned to the Sun Belt from the Colonial Athletic Association. The Panthers play football at Center Parc Stadium, which was originally built as Centennial Olympic Stadium for the 1996 Olympics before being converted to Turner Field, a baseball stadium for the Atlanta Braves.

=== Kennesaw State ===
The Kennesaw State Owls, based in unincorporated Cobb County near the northern suburb of Kennesaw, represent Kennesaw State University in 17 varsity sports in Conference USA (CUSA). KSU did not start a football program until 2015. Since the school's then-current primary home of the Atlantic Sun Conference (ASUN) did not sponsor football at the time, the KSU football team joined the Big South Conference. For the 2022–23 academic year, the ASUN became an FCS football-sponsoring conference, and Kennesaw State moved its football membership to the ASUN. In October 2022, Kennesaw State accepted an invitation to join CUSA, which included transitioning the football team to the Football Bowl Subdivision, effective in July 2024. KSU will play its first season as a full FBS member in 2025.

=== Emory University ===
Atlanta is also home to the Emory University Eagles, an NCAA Division III athletic powerhouse nestled in the Druid Hills neighborhood. Competing in the University Athletic Association conference and boasting 31 NCAA Division III National Championships, the leaders of this program include men's and women's swimming & diving with 14 national championships, men's and women's tennis with 14 national championships, women's volleyball with 2 national championships, and women's golf with 1 national championship. Notable alumni include Andrew Wilson, a 2021 Olympian for Team USA, and gold medalist in the 4x100-meter medley relay.

== Tournaments and events ==
=== Running races ===
Giving itself the nickname "Running City USA", Atlanta hosts several popular road running events. The annual Peachtree Road Race is the world's largest 10 km race. Other annual races include the Atlanta Marathon and the Thanksgiving Day Half Marathon.

=== Tournaments hosted ===
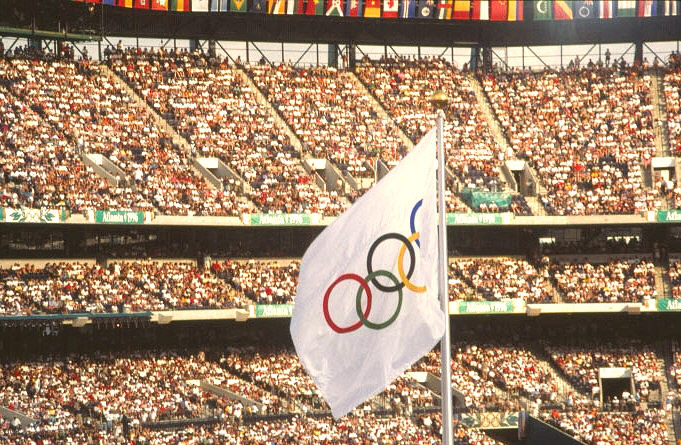
The Olympic flag flies at the Atlanta Olympic Stadium during the 1996 Summer Olympics.

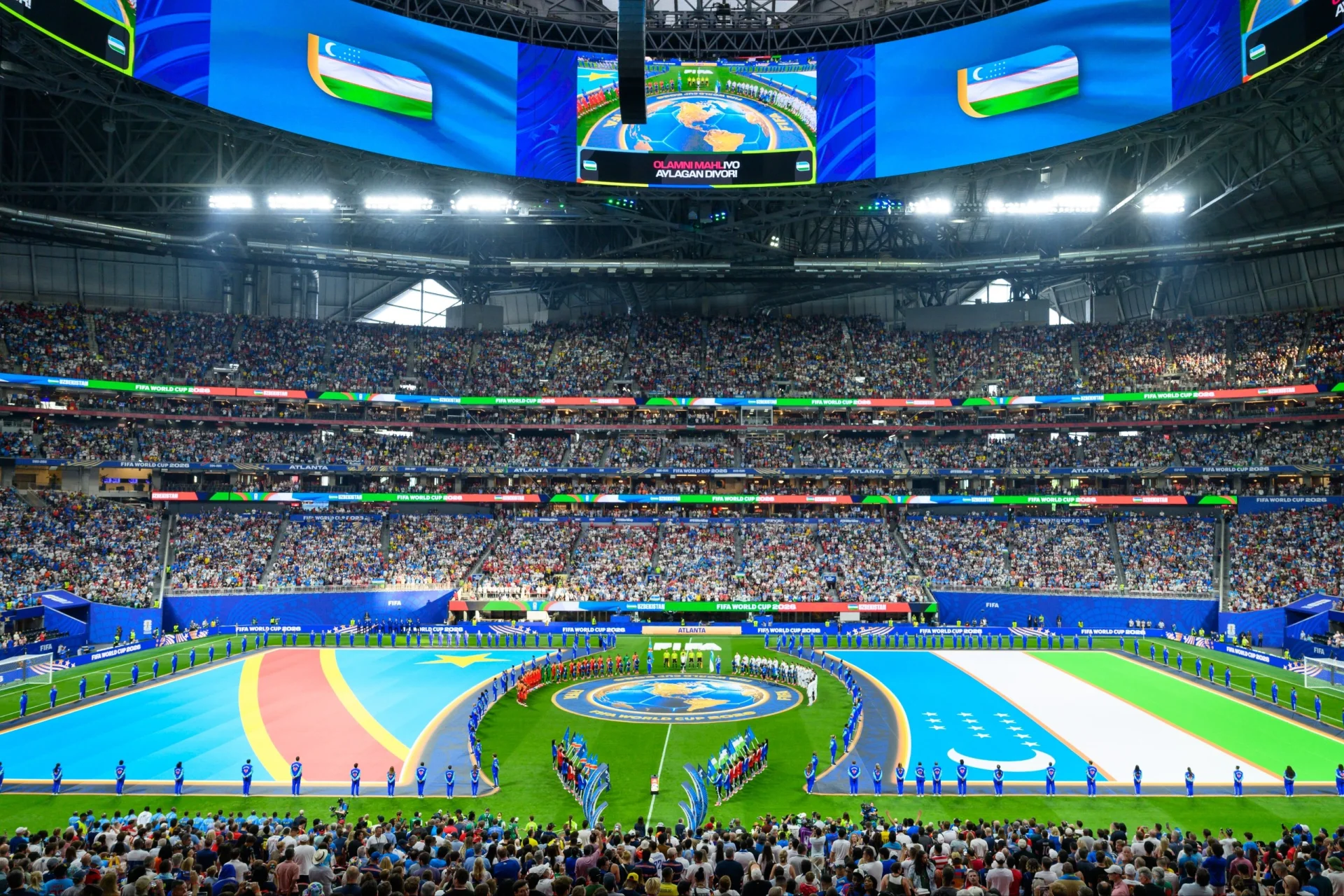
Inside Mercedes-Benz Stadium prior a match between DR Congo and Uzbekistan at the 2026 FIFA World Cup.

Atlanta was the host city for the Centennial 1996 Summer Olympics and has hosted Super Bowl XXVIII (1994), Super Bowl XXXIV (2000), Super Bowl LIII (2019), and Super Bowl LXII (2028). Atlanta has also hosted the NCAA Final Four Men's Basketball Championship, most recently in 2013. The city hosts college football's annual Chick-fil-A Bowl (Formerly known as the Peach Bowl) and also hosted the 2018 College Football Playoff National Championship and will host again for the 2025 College Football Playoff National Championship. Atlanta hosted the NCAA Final Four Men's Basketball Championship in April 2002, April 2007, and April 2013. Atlanta is one of the eleven US host cities for the 2026 FIFA World Cup.

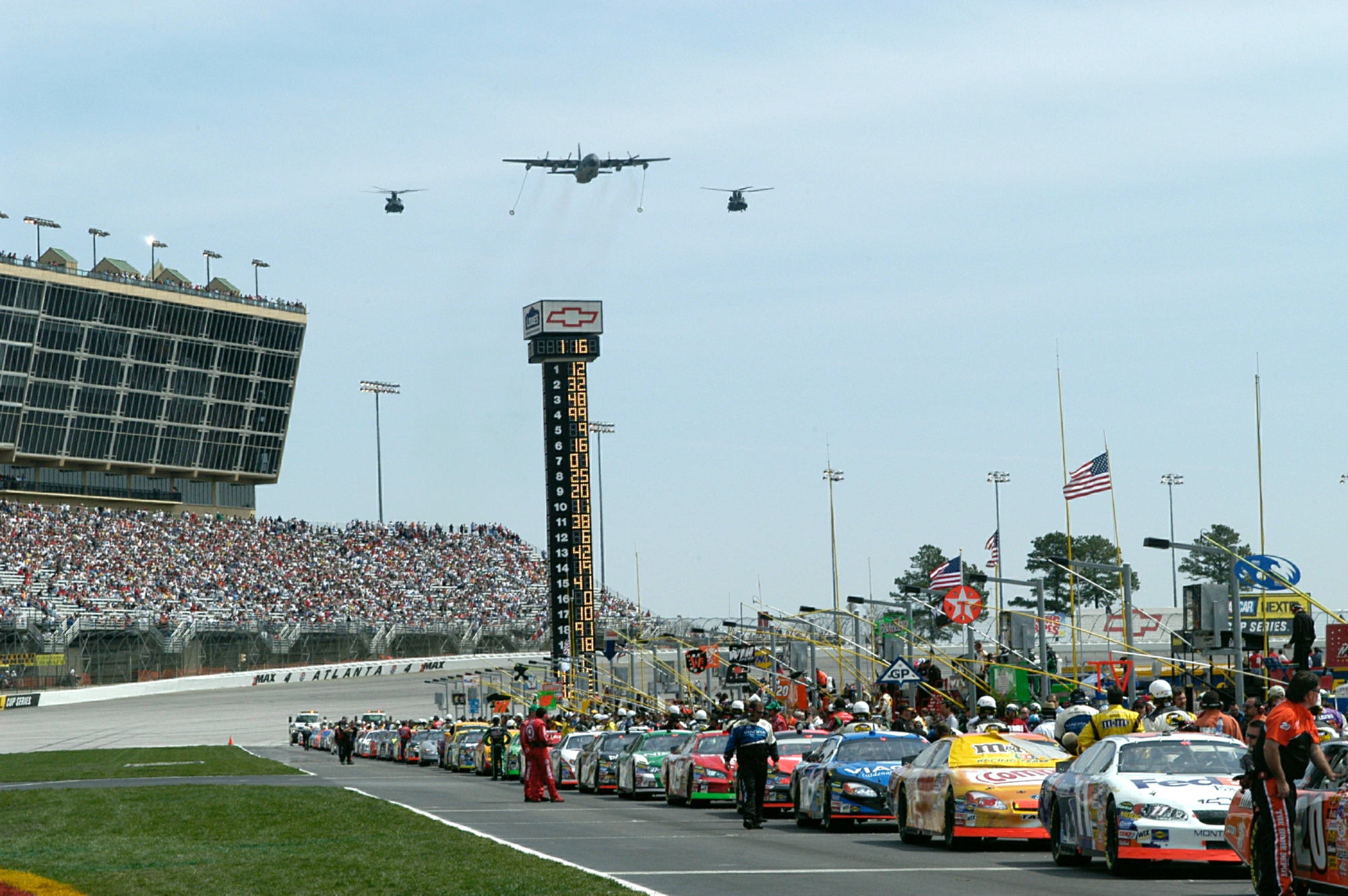
Atlanta Motor Speedway

=== Other events ===
Racing facilities include Atlanta Motor Speedway, a 1.5 mile (2.4 km) NASCAR race track in Hampton, and Road Atlanta in Braselton. In 2005 Atlanta competed with other major U.S. cities for the NASCAR Hall of Fame. In March 2006, Atlanta lost to Charlotte, North Carolina.

In golf, the final PGA Tour event of the season, The Tour Championship, is played annually at East Lake Golf Club. This golf course is used because of its connection to the great amateur golfer Bobby Jones, an Atlanta native. The current champion is Viktor Hovland.

Atlanta also was the home to the now-defunct World Championship Wrestling hosted two Starcade events, held each Thanksgiving night, by WCW. Atlanta also hosted WrestleMania XXVII in the Georgia Dome on April 3, 2011. Philips Arena hosted WWE's Survivor Series pay-per-view in 2015. The company would then return for another event, this time in 2024, where State Farm Arena would host Bad Blood. The event drew WWE's largest indoor arena gate of all time, and it was WWE's 60th sold-out event of 2024.
