= Los Angeles Spinners =

American table tennis team

- Founded: 2023 (as Seattle Spinners)
- League: Major League Table Tennis (MLTT)
- Conference: Western Division
- Location: Los Angeles, California
- Arena: Terasaki Budokan
- Colors: Black, White, and Blue
- Head coach: Romain Lorentz

The Los Angeles Spinners, formerly known as the Seattle Spinners, are a professional table tennis team based in Los Angeles, California. They compete in Major League Table Tennis (MLTT) as a member of the Western Division. Originally founded in 2023, the franchise is a founding member of the first professional team-based table tennis league in the United States.

== History ==
=== Founding and relocation (2023–2024) ===
The franchise was established in 2023 as the Seattle Spinners, one of the eight original teams of Major League Table Tennis. The team competed in the Western Division during the inaugural 2023–24 season, finishing 4th in their division with a 7–15 record. In early 2025, the league announced that the team would relocate to Los Angeles under new ownership to leverage the city's significant table tennis community and diverse sports market.

=== The move to LA (2024–present) ===
The team officially rebranded as the Los Angeles Spinners for the 2024–25 season. To lead the transition, the club hired Romain Lorentz as Head Coach. Lorentz brought immediate championship experience to the bench, having served as a key player for the Season 1 champion Carolina Gold Rush.

The team established its home base at the Terasaki Budokan in Little Tokyo, making their home debut there in December 2025. During the 2025–26 season, the team was led by veteran Marcos Madrid, who earned a reputation as a specialist in the league's "Golden Game" format. The Spinners finished their 2025–26 campaign with an 8–10 record, narrowly missing the playoffs by just three points.

== Venue ==
The Spinners play their home matches and host regional "homestands" at the Terasaki Budokan. Located in the Little Tokyo district of Los Angeles, the 20,000-square-foot facility serves as a central hub for the Southern California table tennis community.

== Roster ==
| Player | Country | Notable Achievement |
|---|---|---|
| Adi Sareen | Australia | Youngest-ever ITTF-Oceania Champion |
| Marcos Madrid | Mexico | Mexican Olympian and Golden Game specialist |
| Matilda Ekholm | Sweden | Former World No. 20 |
| Kou Lei | Ukraine | 2016 Olympic Quarterfinalist |
| Lubomír Pistej | Slovakia | World-class Doubles specialist |
| Alexandre Robinot | France | Former French National Champion |
