= Carolina Gold Rush (table tennis) =

American table tennis team

- Founded: 2023
- League: Major League Table Tennis (MLTT)
- Conference: Eastern Division
- Location: Charlotte, North Carolina
- Arena: Charlotte Convention Center
- Colors: Gold, Black, White
- Head coach: Shigang "Alex" Yang
- Championships: 1 (2025)
- Website: https://www.mltt.com/mltt-team/carolina-gold-rush

Carolina Gold Rush is a professional table tennis team based in Charlotte, North Carolina. Founded in 2023, the team competes in the Eastern Division of Major League Table Tennis (MLTT). They are the 2025 MLTT Cup Champions, having won the league's second-ever championship title.

== History ==
The Carolina Gold Rush was established as one of the eight founding franchises of Major League Table Tennis. In September 2023, Nora and John McSweeney, entrepreneurs and residential real estate investors, expanded their investment holdings to include the Carolina Gold Rush.

In the inaugural 2023–2024 season, the Gold Rush finished the regular season as the #1 overall seed but were defeated by The Texas Smash in the semifinals. In the 2024–2025 season, the team returned to the playoffs and defeated the Texas Smash to claim the MLTT Cup. During the 2025–26 Major League Table Tennis season, the Carolina Gold Rush finished the regular season in 1st place in the East Division with an 11–7 record but lost in the Championship Final to the Portland Paddlers by a score of 21–18, finishing the season as runners-up.

== Team identity ==
The team's name is a tribute to the Carolina Gold Rush of 1799, the first significant gold rush in the United States.

Carolina Gold Rush Roster
Player	Nationality	Notes
Enzo Angles	France	2023–24 Men's Season MVP.
Eugene Wang	Canada	Three-time Olympian for Canada.
Edward Ly	Canada	Canadian International competitor.
Kai Zhang	United States	Former U.S. National Champion.
Chen Sun	China	2025–26 Women's MLTT MVP.
Mohamed Shouman	Egypt	Egyptian International competitor.
Hong Lin	United States	2023–24 Women's Season MVP; re-signed under Returning Player Rule.
Park Chan-Hyeok	South Korea	Season 4 Draft pick (Round 1, #9 Overall).

== Season-by-season record ==
Season	League	Division	Regular Season	Playoffs
2023–24	MLTT	East	1st Place	Semifinals
2024–25	MLTT	East	1st Place	Champions
2025–26	MLTT	East	1st Place	Runners-up

== Honors ==
- MLTT Cup
  - Winners (1): 2025
- Eastern Division Regular Season
  - Winners (2): 2024, 2025
