= Jinxin Wang =

Chinese-American table tennis player

Personal information
- Nickname: The Professor
- Born: 1991 (age 34–35) Zhengzhou, Henan, China

Sport
- Sport: Table tennis
- Playing style: Right-handed, shakehand
- Highest ranking: 76 (2015)
Medal record
Men's table tennis
Representing United States
U.S. Open Championships
Gold medal – first place	2015 Las Vegas	Men's Singles
China University Games
Bronze medal – third place	2012	Men's Singles

Jinxin Wang (born 1991) is a Chinese-American professional table tennis player and coach. He currently competes in Major League Table Tennis (MLTT) for the Princeton Revolution. Wang is a former U.S. Open Men's Singles champion.

== Early life and education ==
Born in Zhengzhou, Henan Province, China, Wang began playing table tennis at age six. He was a member of the Henan provincial team and later competed for the Xi'an Jiaotong University team. In 2012, he placed third in the Men’s Singles event at the 9th China University Games.

Wang moved to the United States in September 2014 and later attended Texas Wesleyan University, where he competed for the university's table tennis team while pursuing a degree in Business Marketing and Management.

== Professional career ==
=== U.S. Open Championship ===
Wang won the Men's Singles title at the 2015 U.S. Open Table Tennis Championships in Las Vegas. He defeated four-time Olympian Adrian Crișan of Romania in the final, recovering from a deficit to win the match in six games (5–11, 11–4, 4–11, 12–10, 12–10, 11–5).

=== Major League Table Tennis (MLTT) ===
Wang is a member of the Princeton Revolution in Major League Table Tennis. During the inaugural seasons, he emerged as a primary player for the Princeton roster, contributing to the team's standing in the East Division. As of early 2026, he maintains a high competitive rating within the league's "SPINDEX" system.

=== Coaching and technical contributions ===
In addition to his playing career, Wang is a professional coach. He has served as a coach at the Apple headquarters in Sunnyvale, California, and as the head coach for the Champion Star International Academy. He has also authored technical articles for Butterfly Table Tennis focusing on the mechanical importance of the wrist and fingers in stroke production.

== Personal life ==
Following his 2015 U.S. Open victory, Wang proposed to his girlfriend, Wen Ting Zha, on the court during the trophy presentation.
