= Koyo Kanamitsu =

Japanese table tennis player

Personal information
- Native name: 金光 宏暢 (Japanese)
- Nationality: Japanese
- Born: May 6, 2000 (age 26) Japan

Sport
- Sport: Table tennis
- Club: Princeton Revolution (Major League Table Tennis)
- Playing style: Right-handed, Shakehand, Attacker
- Equipment: Donic
- Highest ranking: 1 (ITTF Under-21, April 2019)
Medal record
Men's table tennis
Representing Japan
ITTF Challenge Series
Gold medal – first place	2017 Zagreb	U21 Singles
Gold medal – first place	2018 Croatia	U21 Singles

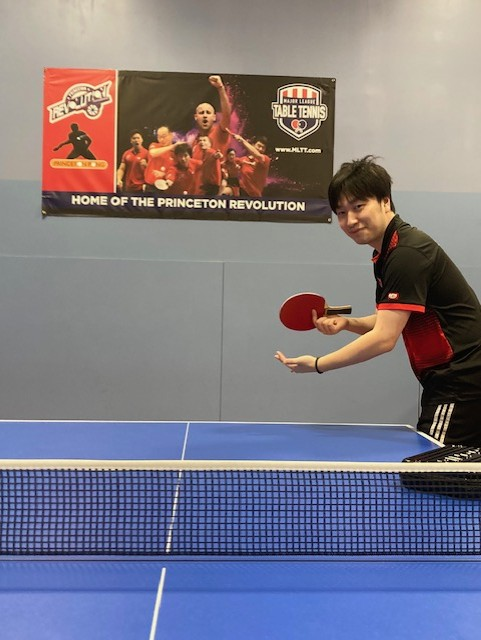
Kanamitsu at Princeton Pong

Koyo Kanamitsu (born May 6, 2000) is a Japanese professional table tennis player residing in New Jersey, United States. He reached the No. 1 position in the ITTF Under-21 world rankings in April 2019. He currently competes for the Major League Table Tennis (MLTT) team, the Princeton Revolution.

== Education ==
Kanamitsu attended Nippon Sport Science University and Nihon University. During his collegiate career in Japan, he competed in the All-Japan University League.

== Career ==
=== Junior and U21 career ===
Kanamitsu won the Junior Boys' Singles title at the 2016 Spanish Junior & Cadet Open. On May 5, 2017, he won the Under-21 Men's Singles title at the ITTF Challenge Zagreb Open, defeating Tomas Polansky 3–1 in the final. In 2018, he won the U21 title at the Croatia Open.

In April 2019, Kanamitsu attained the No. 1 ranking in the ITTF Under-21 Men's World Rankings, replacing Yuto Kizukuri.

=== Professional career in the United States ===
Kanamitsu joined the Princeton Revolution for the inaugural season of Major League Table Tennis (MLTT). In December 2024, Kanamitsu and partner Minami Ando won the Mixed Doubles title at the U.S. Open in Las Vegas. In 2025, he reached the final of the Men's Singles event at the U.S. Open, finishing as the silver medalist.

Kanamitsu trains at Princeton Pong, home of the Princeton Revolution

== Playing style and equipment ==
Kanamitsu is a right-handed shakehand attacker. He is sponsored by Donic and uses the following equipment:

- Blade: Donic Original True Carbon Inner
- Forehand Rubber: Donic Bluestar J1
- Backhand Rubber: Donic Bluegrip A1
