= Princeton Revolution =

Professional table tennis team

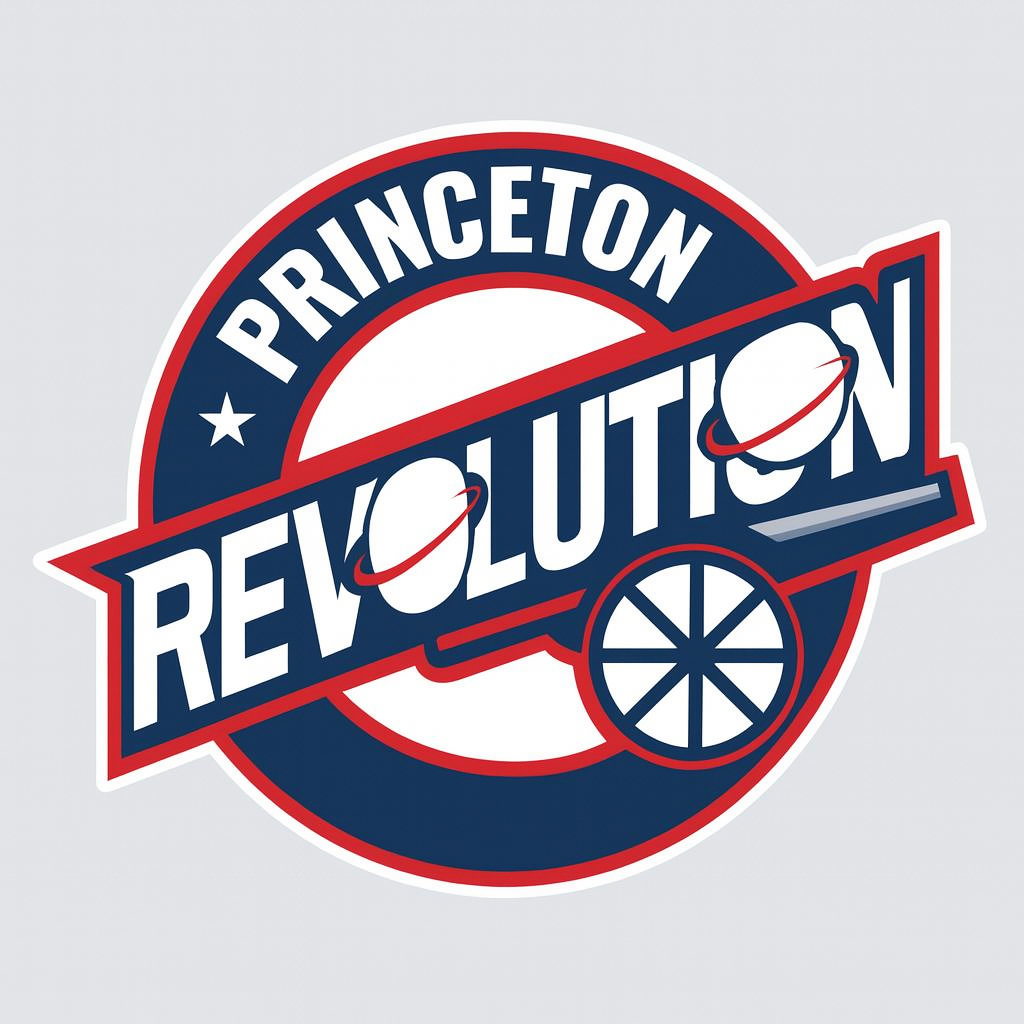
- Founded: 2023
- League: Major League Table Tennis (MLTT)
- Division: East Division
- Location: Princeton, New Jersey
- Arena: Princeton Pong
- Colors: Red, white, blue
- Owners: Roger Kang, Andre Liu, Dimitrij Ovtcharov, Lin Yun-ju
- Head coach: Mathias Habesohn
- Website: www.mltt.com/mltt-team/princeton-revolution

The Princeton Revolution is a professional American table tennis team based in Princeton, New Jersey. Founded in 2023, the team is one of the eight charter members of Major League Table Tennis (MLTT), competing in the league's East Division. The Revolution finished as the runners-up in the inaugural 2023–24 MLTT Championship.

== History ==
The Princeton Revolution were formed in September 2023 after entrepreneur Flint Lane created Major League Table Tennis. The ownership group for the Princeton Revolution is headed by major owner Roger Kang, Andre Liu and Olympic Medalist from Germany Dimitrij Ovtcharov. In November 2024, it was reported that Taiwanese star Lin Yun-ju also joined the ownership group of the franchise.

It was announced in November 2024 that Taiwan superstar Lin Yun-ju would be joining the ownership group of the franchise.

During their first year (the 2023-2024) in Major League Table Tennis the Princeton Revolution earned a 13-9 win/loss record and finished in second place in the East division. The Revolution went on to defeat the Bay Area Blasters in the Semifinals of the 2024 Championship Weekend in Chicago but ultimately lost to the Texas Smash in the Finals.

In the 2025-26 Season the Revolution earned the last eastern conference playoff position in the final weekend of games at Rider University; they beat out the New York Slice.

== Team identity ==
The "Revolution" name is a direct tribute to the city's role in the American Revolutionary War. The team is named in honor of the Battle of Princeton (January 3, 1777), a victory led by General George Washington that served as a turning point in the war for independence. This historical connection is further reflected in the team's primary colors of red, white, and blue, which evoke the "Spirit of '76" and the local heritage of the Princeton area.

== Current roster ==
Player	Country	Notes
Cho Seungmin	South Korea	
Yang Shuo	China	
Benedek Oláh	Finland	Former Olympian
Hsien Tzu Cheng	Chinese Taipei	
Koyo Kanamitsu	Japan	
Jinxin Wang	United States	
Jiangshan Guo	China	
Kang Dong-Soo	South Korea	Multiple-time Korean National Champion

=== Past players ===
Player	Nationality	Season(s)
Jishan Liang	United States	2023–2024
Angela Guan	United States	2023–2024
Ievgen Pryshchepa	Ukraine	2023–2024

== Season-by-season records ==
Season	Record (W–L)	Points	Division Finish	Playoffs
2023–24	13–9	252	2nd, East	Runners-up
2024–25	9–9	189	3rd, East	DNQ
2025–26	11–7	234	2nd, East	4th Place
