= Yang Shuo =

Yang Shuo may refer to:

- Yang Shuo (writer) (1913–1968), Chinese lyricist and essayist
- Yang Shuo (actor) (born 1983), Chinese actor
