= Atlanta Blazers =

American table tennis team

- Founded: 2025
- League: Major League Table Tennis (MLTT)
- Conference: East Division
- Location: Atlanta, Georgia
- Head coach: Suzi Battison
- Website: mltt.com/teams/atlanta-blazers/

The Atlanta Blazers are a professional table tennis team based in Atlanta, Georgia. The team competes in the East Division of Major League Table Tennis (MLTT). Established in 2025, the Blazers joined the league as an expansion franchise for its third season. In Sept 2025, the league announced the sale of the team to Scott Staples, CEO of First Advantage.

== History ==
On March 14, 2025, MLTT announced Atlanta as an expansion market alongside the New York Slice. The franchise formed its initial roster during the 2025 MLTT Draft held on April 28. With the first overall selection in the expansion phase, the Blazers drafted Yuya Oshima. On November 14, 2025, the Blazers hosted their first home competition at the Gas South Convention Center.

== Team identity ==
The Blazers' branding uses a color scheme of red, orange, and black. The team name, logo and color scheme all refer to the “Hotlanta” aspect of Atlanta’s scorching summer heat. The team represents the Atlanta, Georgia metro area.

== Roster and personnel ==
=== Current roster ===
Player	Nationality	Acquisition Method
Quadri Aruna	Nigeria	2026 Draft (#1 Overall)
Yuya Oshima	Japan	2025 Draft (#1 Overall)
Kayama Yu	Japan	2025 Draft
Tom Feng	USA	2025 Draft
Braxton Chang	USA	Returning
Rachel Sung	USA	Trade (Dec 2025)
Yuanxinai Yuan	China	2026 Draft
Kim Woojin	South Korea	2026 Draft

=== Transactions ===
On December 22, 2025, the Blazers completed a trade with the Portland Paddlers. The team traded Minhyung Jee and a Season 4 second-round draft pick to Portland in exchange for Rachel Sung. The transaction reunited Sung with former teammate Jiwei Xia.

=== Coaching staff ===
- Suzi Battison (2025–Present): Appointed as the inaugural head coach. Battison's background includes competing in China and coaching at the National Stadium in New Jersey beginning in 2013.

== See also ==
- Sports in Atlanta
