= Motorsport in the United States =

The start of the 2015 Daytona 500, the biggest race in NASCAR

Motor sports are widely popular in the United States, but Americans generally are in favor of home-grown racing series over major international series, such as Formula One and MotoGP.

Road racing has generally waned, though an extensive, albeit illegal street racing culture persists.

== History ==
Americans, like the rest of the world, initially began using public streets as a host of automobile races. As time progressed it was soon discovered that these venues were often unsafe to the public as they offered relatively little crowd control. Promoters and drivers in the United States discovered that horse racing tracks could provide better conditions for drivers and spectators than public streets.

In the 1910s, board track racing became widely popular. Based on the concept of the velodrome used in bicycle racing, board tracks were relatively inexpensive but could accommodate far faster speeds than dirt tracks. The drawbacks of board tracks soon became apparent: the tracks were difficult to maintain and, being constructed of wood, highly flammable; most closed or burned down within a few years of opening, with the phenomenon as a whole largely abandoned by the end of the 1920s. Many of the principles that board tracks used, including the elliptical banked tracks with smooth surfaces, were later adapted into oval track racing, first by the contemporary brickyard surface pioneered by Indianapolis Motor Speedway in 1909, then on asphalt surfaces, which provided many of the benefits of board tracks without the flammability or durability problems.

The result has been long standing popularity for oval track racing while road racing has waned; however, an extensive illegal street racing culture persists.

== Indianapolis 500 ==
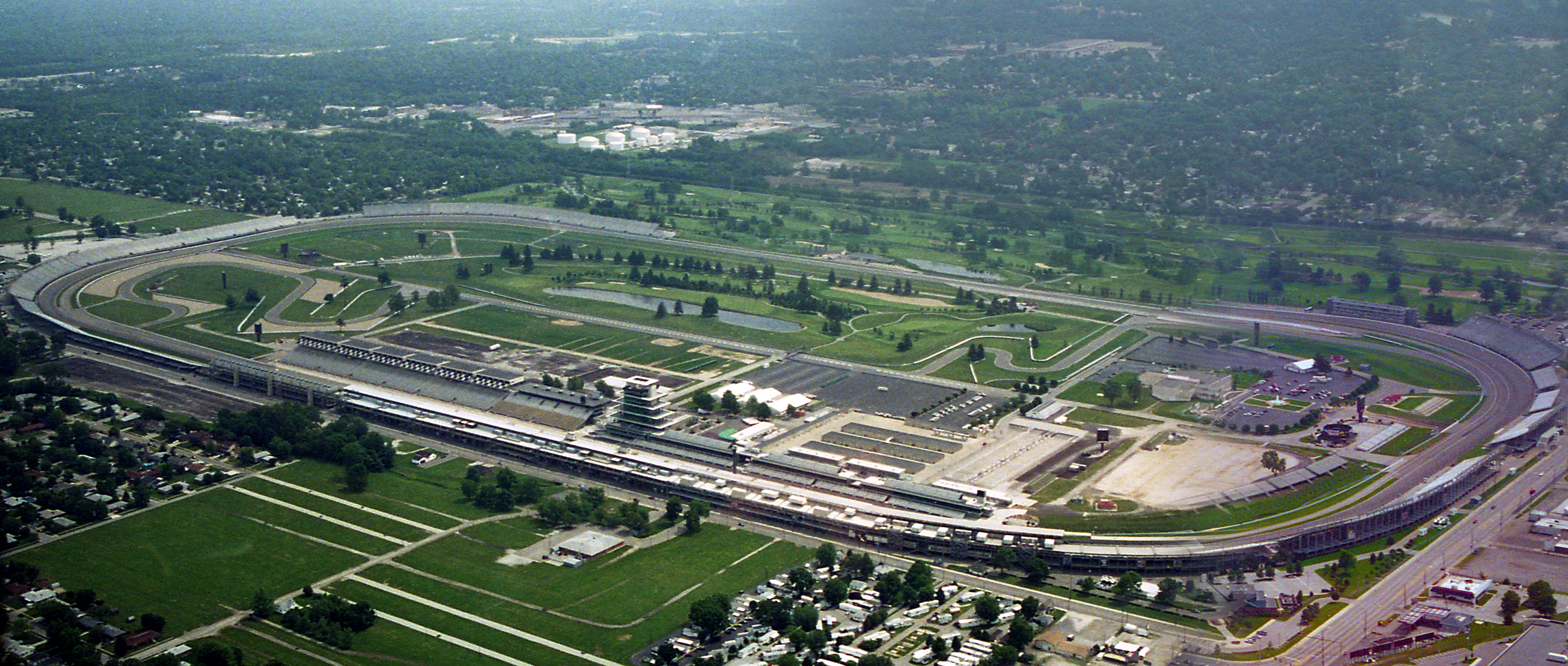
Indianapolis Motor Speedway is among the world's premier racing facilities.

Historically, open wheel racing was the most popular nationwide, with the Indianapolis 500 being the most widely followed race. However, an acrimonious split in 1994 between the primary series, CART (later known as Champ Car), and the Indianapolis Motor Speedway (the site of the Indy 500) led to the formation of the Indy Racing League, now known as INDYCAR, which launched the rival IndyCar Series in 1996. From that point, the popularity of open wheel racing in the U.S. declined dramatically. The feud was settled in 2008 with an agreement to merge the two series under the IndyCar banner, but enormous damage had already been done to the sport.

Notable IndyCar drivers include A. J. Foyt, Rick Mears, Mario Andretti, Michael Andretti, Al Unser, Al Unser Jr., Bobby Unser, Dario Franchitti and Scott Dixon.

Since reunification, the Indycar series and especially the Indianapolis 500 have enjoyed a resurgence. The 100th running of the Indianapolis 500 in 2016 (races were not held during the years of 1917-1918 and 1942-1945 due to world wars) featured the largest crowd in more than two decades, and local Indianapolis media suspended their longstanding television "blackout" during the race due to a sold-out crowd. Californian rookie and ex-Formula 1 driver Alexander Rossi won the 2016 Indy 500 on fuel mileage and subsequently became an IndyCar mainstay at Andretti Autosport.

Subsequent races have featured victories by Takuma Sato (2017), Will Power (2018), and Simon Pagenaud (2019).

Longtime team owner and billionaire Roger Penske purchased Indianapolis Motor Speedway, the IndyCar series, and IMS Productions in November 2019.

== NASCAR ==
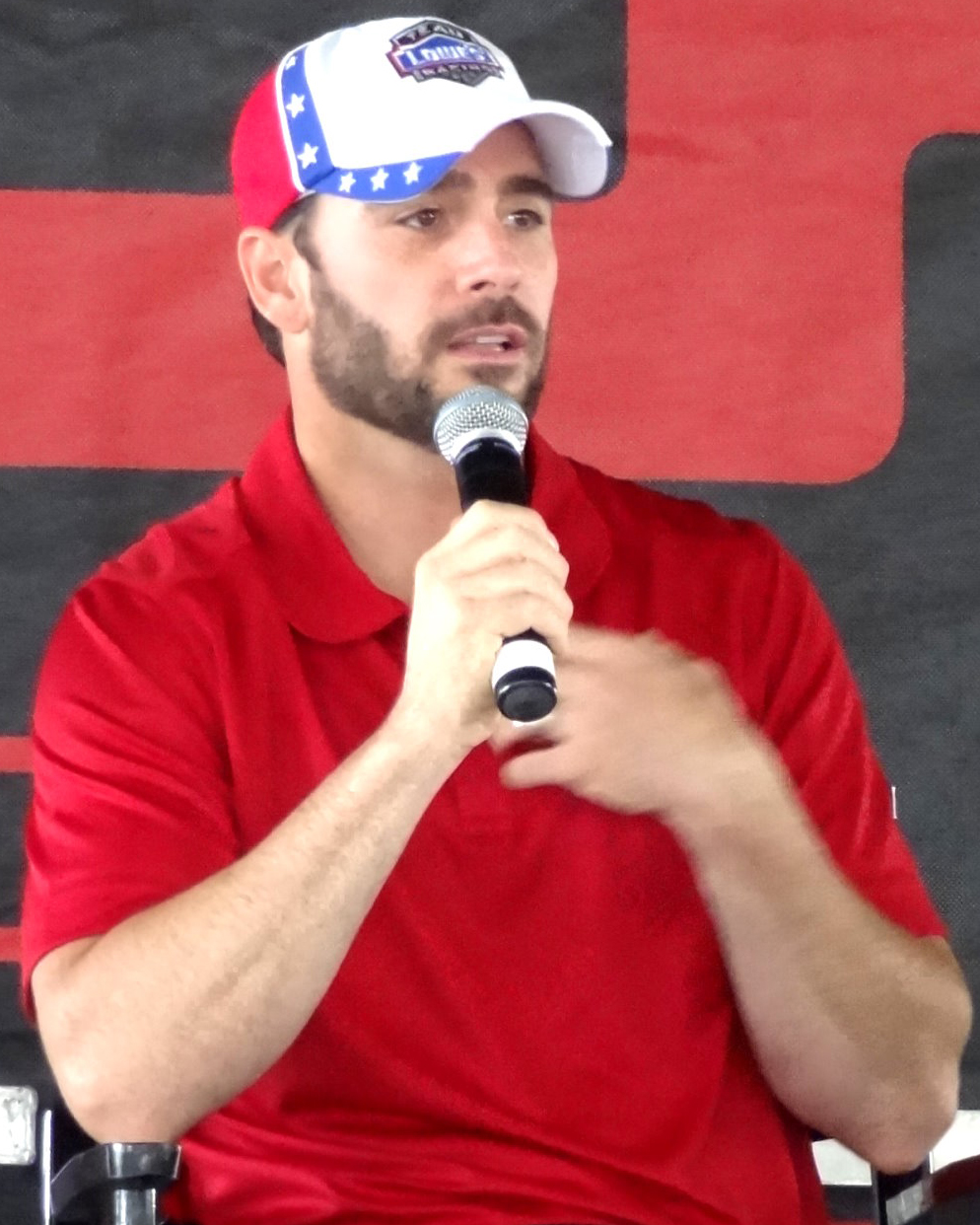
Jimmie Johnson has won Driver of the Year five times.

The CART-IRL feud coincided with an enormous expansion of stock car racing, governed by NASCAR, from its past as a mostly regional circuit mainly followed in the Southern U.S. to a truly national sport. NASCAR's NASCAR Cup Series generally harnesses an 8 million person audience on television, as well as sold-out crowds at many tracks. In the last few years however, attendance and television ratings are down considerably. Many fans stated increasing costs of attending (tickets, hotels) and recent rule changes as reasons why they stopped attending or watching NASCAR races. The most prestigious NASCAR race is the Daytona 500 at the beginning of the season in February. Popular NASCAR drivers include Jeff Gordon, Jimmie Johnson, Tony Stewart, Dale Earnhardt Jr., and Kyle Busch.

== Formula One ==
Although the world's most popular form of motorsport, Formula One, is not as popular in the U.S., it has been conducted in the US at several venues including Sebring, Riverside, Watkins Glen, Phoenix, Long Beach and the Indianapolis Grand Prix. It was hosted in Austin, Texas, in November 2012. The race was run at a new venue (which now also hosts MotoGP, and the NASCAR Cup series) named Circuit of the Americas. The 2012 event was the first United States Grand Prix held since 2007. A second race, called the Grand Prix of America, was to take place in Weehawken, New Jersey, designed to give a view of the New York City skyline. The race was planned for the 2013 season, but was delayed and the idea was abandoned. Despite this, a second race in the United States would later follow in 2022 with the Miami Grand Prix. A third Formula One race in the United States is confirmed for 2023, with Formula One returning to Las Vegas for the first time since 1982 as the Las Vegas Grand Prix with a new street circuit to be constructed on the Las Vegas Strip.

Two Americans won the F1 drivers world championship: Phil Hill in 1961, driving for Italian team Scuderia Ferrari, and Mario Andretti in 1978, driving for UK based Team Lotus. Andretti also holds the record for most wins by an American in Formula One, with 12 Grand Prix wins. His last, the 1978 dutch Grand Prix, simultaneously marked the last win by an U.S. driver. Eddie Cheever holds the record for most races entered by an American (143). There are no American drivers in Formula 1 today. In total, 58 drivers from the U.S. have driven in Formula One (excluding drivers who have only entered the Indianapolis 500, which was part of the Formula One world championship between 1950 and 1960).

Several American racing teams have entered Formula One as constructors in the past, most notably All American Racers, Penske and Shadows. While A.A.R. and Penske both managed to achieve 3 podium finishes each, Shadows finished 7 times in the top three. However, the team changed its nationality to British in 1973. In 2016 Haas F1 Team entered Formula One. They have yet to achieve their first F1 podium. In 2025, General Motors, under the Cadillac Formula 1 Team brand, was confirmed to enter the 2026 season.

== Formula Drift ==
Formula Drift, also known as Formula D, had its inaugural season in 2004. With 60 currently licensed drivers competing in Pro and Pro 2, Formula Drift is recognized as the premier North American professional drifting championship series. The series consists of an eight-round championship played out at race tracks across North America. Judged on line, angle, and style, rather than who finishes the course in the fastest time, Formula Drift brings together traditional racing and extreme sports.

== Motorcycle ==
Although international street motorcycle racing does not enjoy the mainstream popularity of its all-terrain cousin, motocross, in the U.S., American riders have been very successful. Seven Americans have won a combined fifteen championships in MotoGP. Eddie Lawson has won four championships (more than any other American). Five American riders have won eight Superbike World Championships.

== Endurance racing ==
Another form of auto-racing in the United States is sports car racing. While not as popular as other forms of racing in the country, both the American Le Mans Series and the Rolex Sports Car Series operated as the premier series, now called WeatherTech SportsCar Championship, of sports car endurance racing in the U.S. The former, known informally as the ALMS and sanctioned by IMSA, is based on the rules that govern the world famous 24 Hours of Le Mans endurance race in France. As such, there is a typical European flair in the races and the cars that participate. The Rolex series, sanctioned by Grand-Am, has rules similar to the ALMS, but the cars themselves are ultimately different and are made with a more cost-efficient formula in mind. Among the better known sports car races in America are the 12 Hours of Sebring, 24 Hours of Daytona, and Petit Le Mans. All three races have been featured as rounds in world championships in previous years with Sebring slated to open the 2012 season of the FIA World Endurance Championship.

== Other motor sports ==
Another one of the most popular forms of motorsports in the United States is the indigenous sport of drag racing. The largest drag racing organization, the National Hot Rod Association, boasts 80,000 members, more than 35,000 licensed competitors and nationwide television coverage.

Other indigenous motorsports also enjoy major and widespread popularity. Monster truck demonstrations have a national and regional following; Monster Jam, the widest-known monster truck circuit in the United States, regularly sells out large stadiums on its national tours. Demolition derby, in which vehicles attempt to damage each other until one is left running, is primarily a local phenomenon. Figure 8 racing is a form of banger racing in which vehicles attempt to navigate a purposely intersecting track. Sprint car races feature small, specially designed vehicles with characteristic wings on top; several regional circuits exist for the sport. Dirt track racing, as opposed to most major racing circuits that use asphalt-paved tracks, enjoys local popularity. Several regional circuits also sanction competitions in tractor pulling. Mud bogging, in which trucks attempt to pass through a muddy pit, has popularity in rural areas.

The Australia-based Supercars Championship, which uses cars roughly similar in appearance to NASCAR stock cars but runs exclusively on road courses and street circuits, expanded to the U.S. in 2013 with an event at the Circuit of the Americas, but that proved to be its only U.S. race to date.
