= University City (Charlotte neighborhood) =

- Edge City / Neighborhood
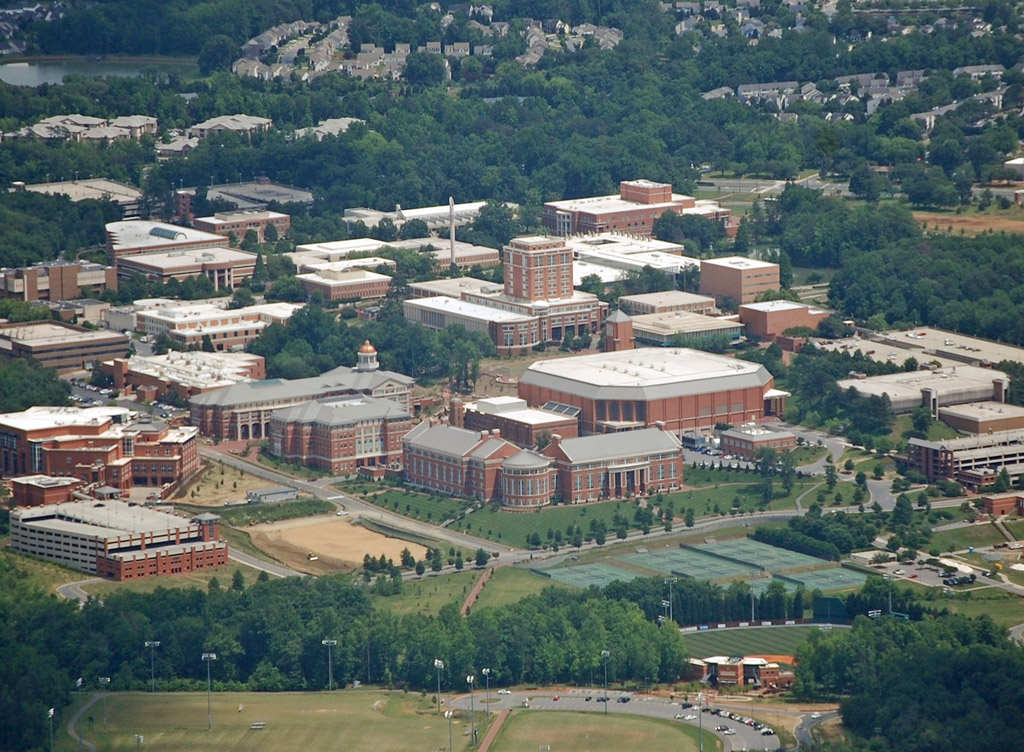
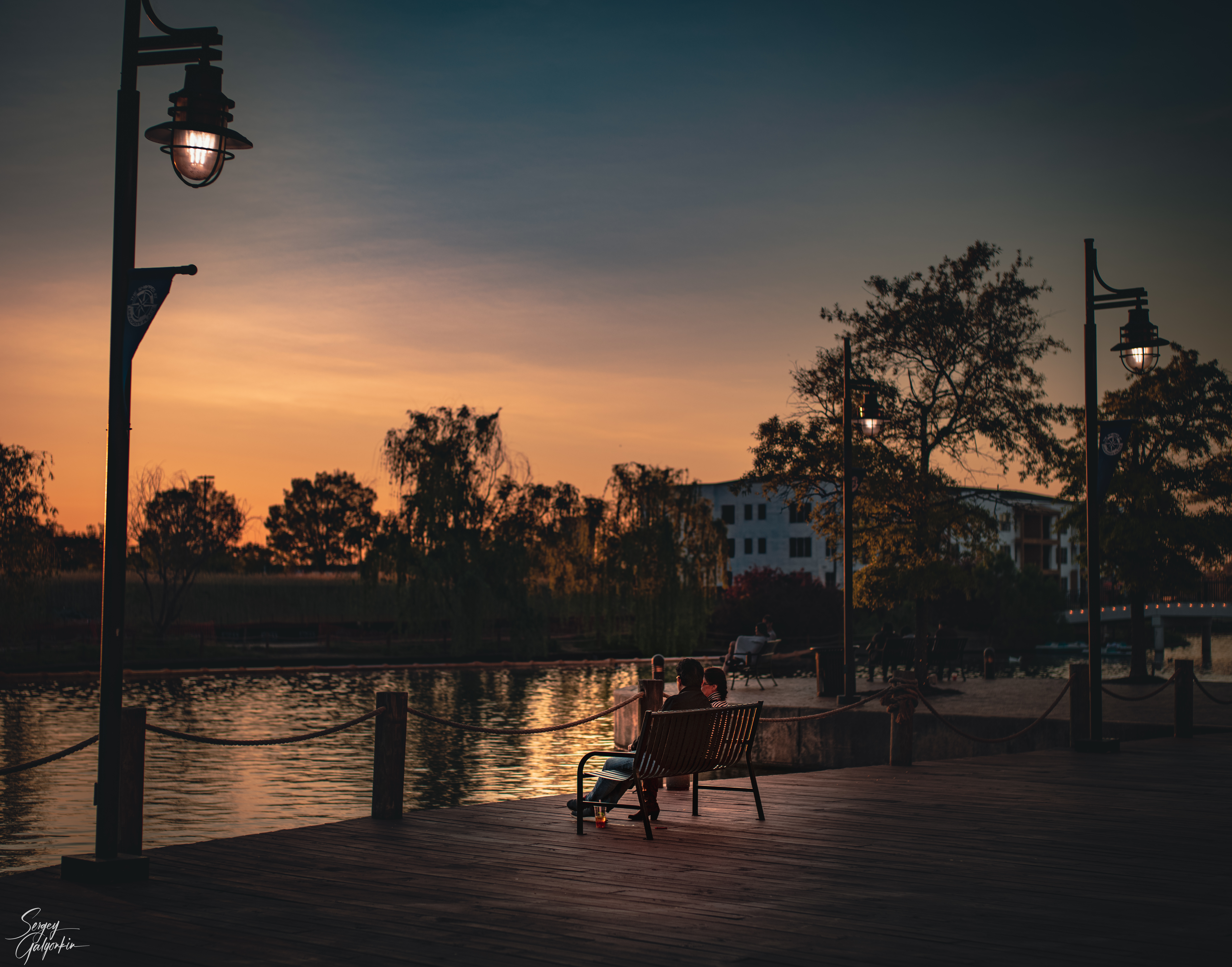
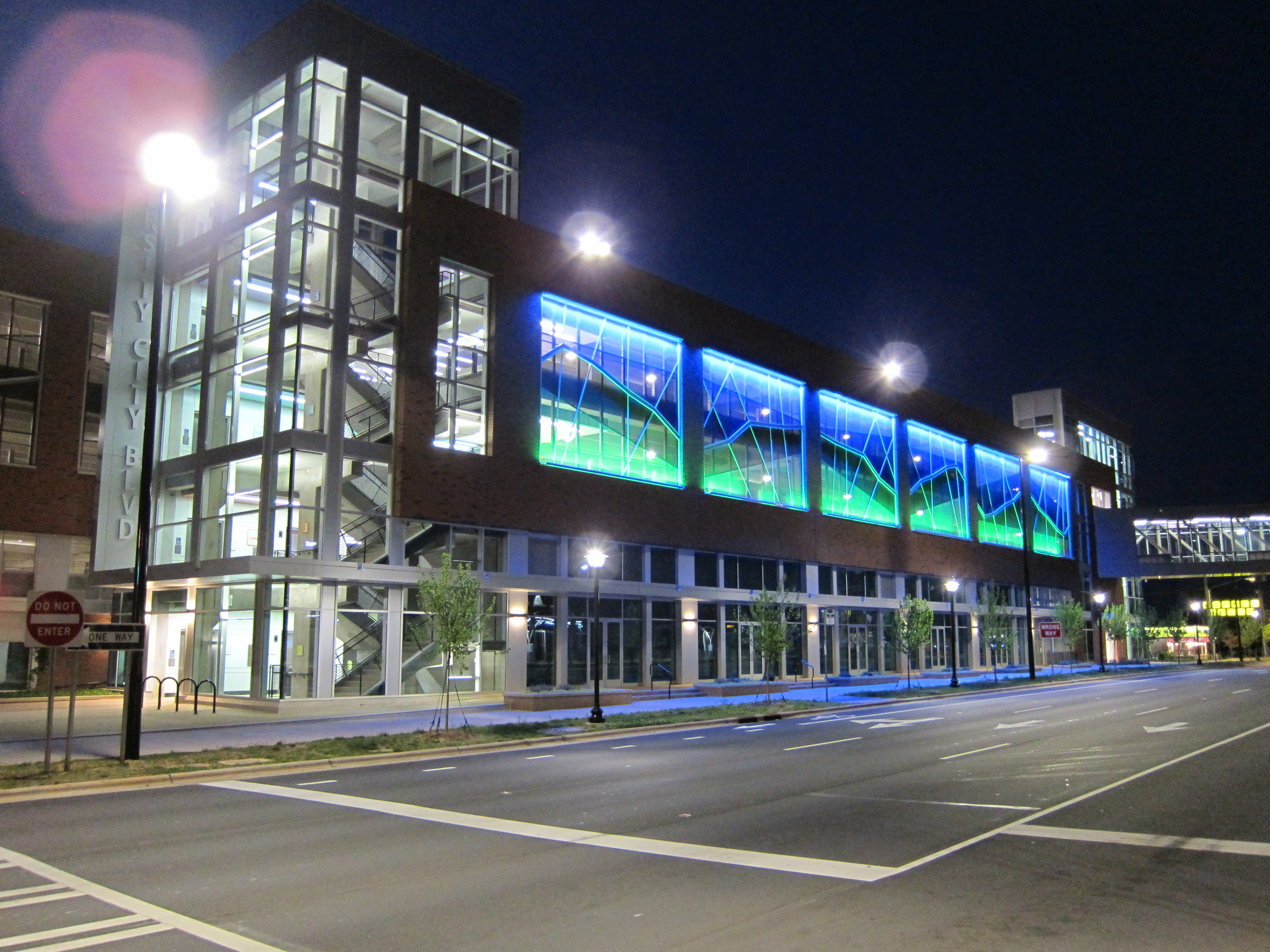
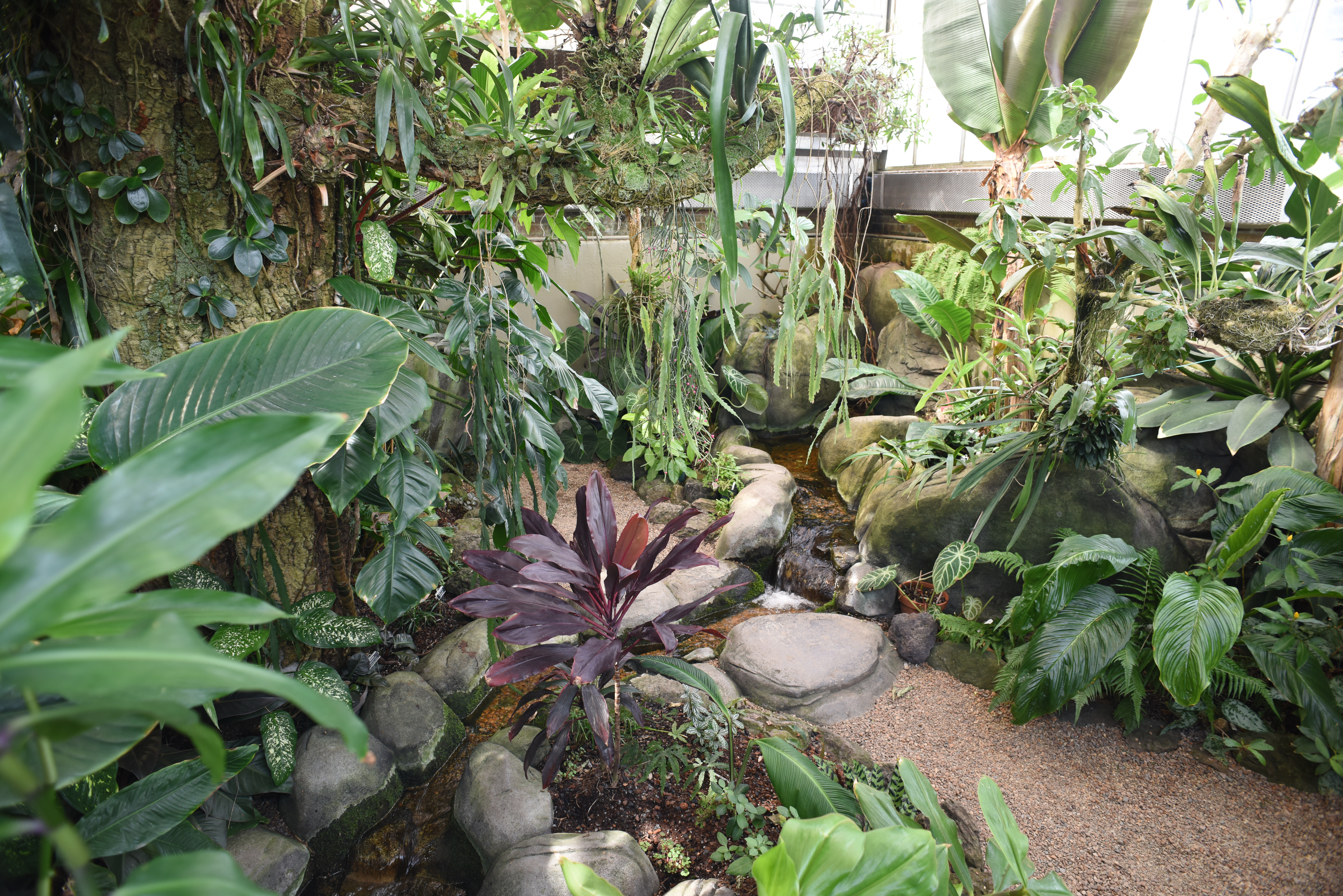
- UNC Charlotte University Place Lake University City Blvd Station UNC Charlotte Botanical Gardens UNC Charlotte
- Nicknames: U-City, University Area, University
- Location in Charlotte
- Coordinates: 35.357°N 80.753°W
- Country: United States
- State: North Carolina
- County: Mecklenburg County
- City: Charlotte
- Council Districts: 2, 4

Government
  - City Council: Malcolm Graham; Renee’ Johnson

Population (2012)
  - Total: 160,000
- Time zone: UTC-5 (EST)
  - Summer (DST): UTC-4 (EDT)
- Zip Code: 28213, 28223, 28262, 28269
- Area codes: 704, 980
- Website: University City Partners

University City (sometimes University Area or U-City) is an edge city mostly within the city limits of Charlotte, North Carolina, United States, surrounding the University of North Carolina at Charlotte campus. It is found in northeastern Mecklenburg County, southeast of Interstate 85 and predominantly along University City Boulevard (NC 49) and W.T. Harris Boulevard (NC 24). Interstate 485 and US 29 (N. Tryon Street) also pass through the area. In 2019, the LYNX Blue Line was extended from Uptown Charlotte to University City. It is neighbored by the town of Harrisburg to the east and the city of Concord to the northeast. Attractions along University City's outskirts include Charlotte Motor Speedway and Concord Mills Mall. The area is managed and overseen by the University City Partners, one of the six Municipal Service Districts in Charlotte.

University City is home to the University Research Park (located on the other side of I-85), one of the largest research parks in the state, and the Truliant Amphitheater. IKEA opened a store in University City on February 18, 2009. This was the first IKEA in the Carolinas

University City is also one of six Municipal Service Districts in Charlotte.

University City has an estimated population of more than 160,000 within its unofficial borders, which includes parts of Charlotte, Concord and Harrisburg. Were it to be separated from the rest of Charlotte as its own city, University City would be North Carolina's seventh largest city.

Following the opening of the LYNX Blue Line in 2019, University City has seen an increase in development, similar to that of South End. As of 2020, the corridor following the Blue Line has 338,000 square feet of office space, 200 hotel rooms, 3,200 apartments, and an entertainment district anchored by a Topgolf location. On July 1, 2020, Centene Corporation announced a 130-acre, $1 billion East Coast headquarters campus in University City.

== Private schools ==
- Cannon School, located in nearby Concord, serves University City families
- Countryside Montessori, located in University City, serves University City families
- Northside Christian Academy, located in University City, serves UniversityCity families
