= Bay Area Blasters =

American table tennis team

- Sport: Table tennis
- Founded: 2023
- League: Major League Table Tennis (MLTT)
- Division: West Division
- Based in: San Francisco Bay Area, California
- Arena: Alameda County Fairgrounds (Pleasanton, CA)
- Colors: Navy, Red, White
- Head coach: Timothy Wang
- Website: www.mltt.com/mltt-team/bay-area-blasters

The Bay Area Blasters are a professional table tennis franchise based in the San Francisco Bay Area that competes in Major League Table Tennis (MLTT). Established in 2023 as one of the league's original eight teams, the Blasters compete in the West Division. The roster features four-time Olympian Lily Zhang and 2024–25 Season 2 co-MVP Taehyun Kim.

== History ==
=== Founding and season 1 (2023–24) ===
The Bay Area Blasters were founded in 2023 for the inaugural season of MLTT. In their first season, the Blasters finished the regular season with a 12–10 record, placing first in the West Division. The team's entry into the San Francisco market was covered by local media as part of a broader expansion of professional table tennis in the United States.

=== Season 2 (2024–25) ===
Coached by Timothy Wang, the Blasters finished the regular season with a 10–8 record, securing second place in the West Division. In the 2024–25 postseason, the team finished third overall after defeating the Carolina Gold Rush in the bronze medal match.

=== Season 3 (2025–26) ===
The Blasters hosted the opening matches of Season 3 at the Alameda County Fairgrounds in September 2025. As of February 2026, the team held the third seed in the West Division following a series of matches in Pleasanton, California.

== Team identity ==
The Bay Area Blasters utilize a branding theme centered on "explosive power" and "West Coast flair." The team's primary colors are **navy**, **maroon red**, and **white**, with official apparel often featuring dynamic gradient graphics and "Blast off!" slogans. The franchise uses the marketing tagline "Play Loud. Play Fast." to describe its competitive style and atmosphere.

== Season records ==
Bay Area Blasters Season Records
Season	W–L	Points	Division Finish	Playoffs
2023–24 (Season 1)	12–10	237	1st, West	Postseason qualifier
2024–25 (Season 2)	10–8	198	2nd, West	3rd place
2025–26 (Season 3)	8–7*	159*	West Division	In progress

*Current standings as of March 2026.

The roster includes international professionals and American players. The team competes in the MLTT format consisting of singles, doubles, and the Golden Game.

Bay Area Blasters Roster
Player	Nationality	Notes
Lily Zhang	United States	Four-time Olympian (2012, 2016, 2020, 2024); reached the Round of 16 in Paris.
Ma Jinbao	United States	Former member of the Chinese National Team; Week 8 Player of the Week.
Elsayed Lashin	Egypt	Three-time Olympian for Egypt (2000, 2008, 2012).
Taehyun Kim	South Korea	Season 2 Co-MVP; winner of the Feb 2026 Westchester Open Singles.
Baek Kwang-Il	South Korea	Former professional in European leagues.
Ge Chi	China	Professional competitor.
Antoine Hachard	France	Season 4 Draft pick (Round 1, #4 Overall); former French National Team member.
Chihweh Yeh	(Chinese Taipei) Taiwan	Season 4 Draft pick (Round 2, #14 Overall).

== Ownership and staff ==
=== Head coach: Tim Wang ===
Tim Wang is a two-time U.S. Olympian (2012, 2016) and a three-time U.S. National Champion in men's singles (2010, 2012, 2013). He was appointed head coach prior to the start of Season 2.
