= Texas Smash =

American table tennis team

- Founded: 2023
- League: Major League Table Tennis (MLTT)
- Conference: Western Division
- Location: Texas
- Arena: Multiple venues (Tour-based)
- Owner: Anita and Mahesh Joshi
- Head coach: Jörg Bitzigeio
- Championships: 1 (2023–24)
- Website: mltt.com/team/texas-smash/

The Texas Smash are a professional table tennis team based in Texas. The team competes in the Western Division of Major League Table Tennis (MLTT) and was the winner of the league's inaugural championship in 2024.

== History ==
The Texas Smash were established in 2023 as one of the eight founding teams for Major League Table Tennis (MLTT). In September 2023, Anita and Mahesh Joshi purchased the franchise. The Texas Smash's managing director, Mahesh Joshi, is also a published business author and the Managing Director of MAN Energy Solutions.

During the 2023–2024 season, the Smash had an overall record of 11–11 throughout the regular season. In the playoffs, they defeated the Carolina Gold Rush in their semifinal matchup. The Texas Smash then won the inaugural MLTT Cup by defeating the Princeton Revolution in the championship final.

During the 2024–2025 season, the Smash finished with the best overall record in the Western Division at the end of the regular season. They advanced to the championship game but finished as runners-up following a loss to the Carolina Gold Rush.

== Coaching Transition ==
During the 2025–26 season, the Smash finished with an 8–10 record, missing the postseason for the first time. On March 24, 2026, the team announced the hiring of Paul Drinkhall as head coach, replacing Jörg Bitzigeio, who had faced travel restrictions due to visa issues.

== Collegiate and Community Impact ==
The franchise has been active in connecting professional table tennis with collegiate programs. Managing director Mahesh Joshi has stated that the professionalization of the sport through MLTT serves to stimulate competitive levels at the collegiate level. This relationship is demonstrated by the development of local talent and the involvement of student-athletes in the professional ecosystem, creating a developmental trajectory for players transitioning from university teams to the professional league.

=== Current roster ===
Player	Country	Notes
Amy Wang	United States	2024 Olympian; 2x U.S. National Champion
David McBeath	England	Team Captain
Nandan Naresh	United States	2024 Olympian
Hiromitsu Kasahara	Japan	Retained active core
Senura Silva	Sri Lanka	Sri Lankan international competitor
Takuya Jin	Japan	Season 4 Draft pick (Round 1, #2 Overall)
Inhyeok Choi	South Korea	Season 4 Draft pick (Round 2, #12 Overall)
Anastasiia Kolish	Russia	Season 4 Draft pick (Round 3, #18 Overall)

== Season-by-season records ==
Season	Record	Points	Division Finish	Postseason
2023–24	11–11	227	2nd, West	Champions
2024–25	11–7	203	1st, West	Runners-up
2025–26	8–10	184	3rd, West	Did not qualify

* Final regular season standings as of April 15, 2026.
