= Florida Crocs =

American table tennis team

- Founded: 2023
- League: Major League Table Tennis (MLTT)
- Division: East
- Location: Hollywood, Florida
- Arena: Broward Table Tennis Club
- Owners: Francisco Alvarez-Demalde, Jeff Parks, Manu Ginóbili
- Head coach: Frank Arias

The Florida Crocs are a professional table tennis team based in Florida, United States. They are one of the eight original teams of Major League Table Tennis (MLTT), competing in the league's East Division.

== History ==
The Florida Crocs were established in September 2023 following the formation of Major League Table Tennis by entrepreneur Flint Lane. The team's ownership group includes Riverwood Capital Co-Founders Francisco Alvarez-Demalde and Jeff Parks, as well as NBA Champion and Olympic Gold Medalist Manu Ginóbili.

=== 2023–24 season ===
In their debut season, led by Coach Frank Arias, the Crocs finished the regular season in 3rd place in the East Division with a 12–10 record (230 points), missing a spot in the championship playoffs.

=== 2024–25 season ===
The Crocs selected England’s Liam Pitchford as the No. 1 overall pick in the 2024 MLTT Draft. The team finished the season in 4th place in the East Division with 181 points.

=== 2025–26 season ===
Liam Pitchford was placed on injured reserve with a hip injury in September 2025, effectively ending his season with the Florida Crocs.

== Venue ==
The Florida Crocs host home matches at the Broward Table Tennis Club in Hollywood, Florida. The venue is a training facility in the Southeast and serves as a hub for MLTT's East Division events.

== Current roster ==
Player	Country	Notes
Daniel Gorak	Poland	Multiple-time Polish National Champion
Marc Duran	Spain	Veteran European league professional
Asuka Sakai	Japan	
Omar Assar	Egypt	Olympian
Hwang Jinha	South Korea	
Yufei Yang	China	
Jishan Liang	United States	
Angel Naranjo	Puerto Rico	

== Records ==
- Best Finish: 3rd Place, East Division (2023–24)
- Notable Draft Picks: Liam Pitchford (#1 Overall, 2024)
