= Carolina gold rush =

First American gold rush starting in 1802

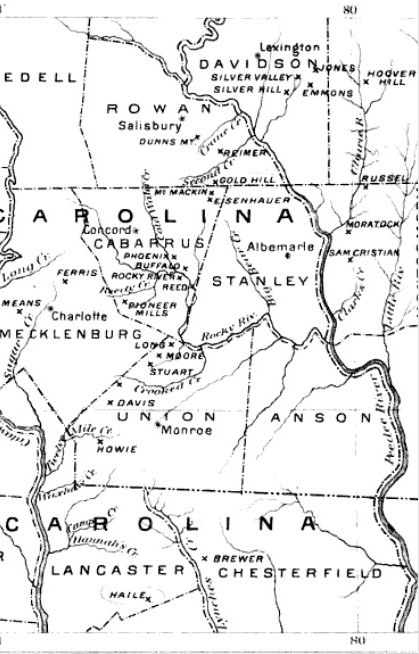
Carolina Gold Belt, showing, south to north, the Haile, Brewer, Howie, Stuart, Moore, Long, Means, Pioneer Mills, Reed, Ferris, Rocky River, Buffalo, Phoenix, San Cristian, Concord, Moratock, Eisenhauer, Mt. Mackin, Russel, Gold Hill, Reimer, Dunns Mt., Salisbury, Silver Hill, Emmons, Silver Valley, Hoover Hill, and Jones mines. Gold-quartz veins are found in the schists.

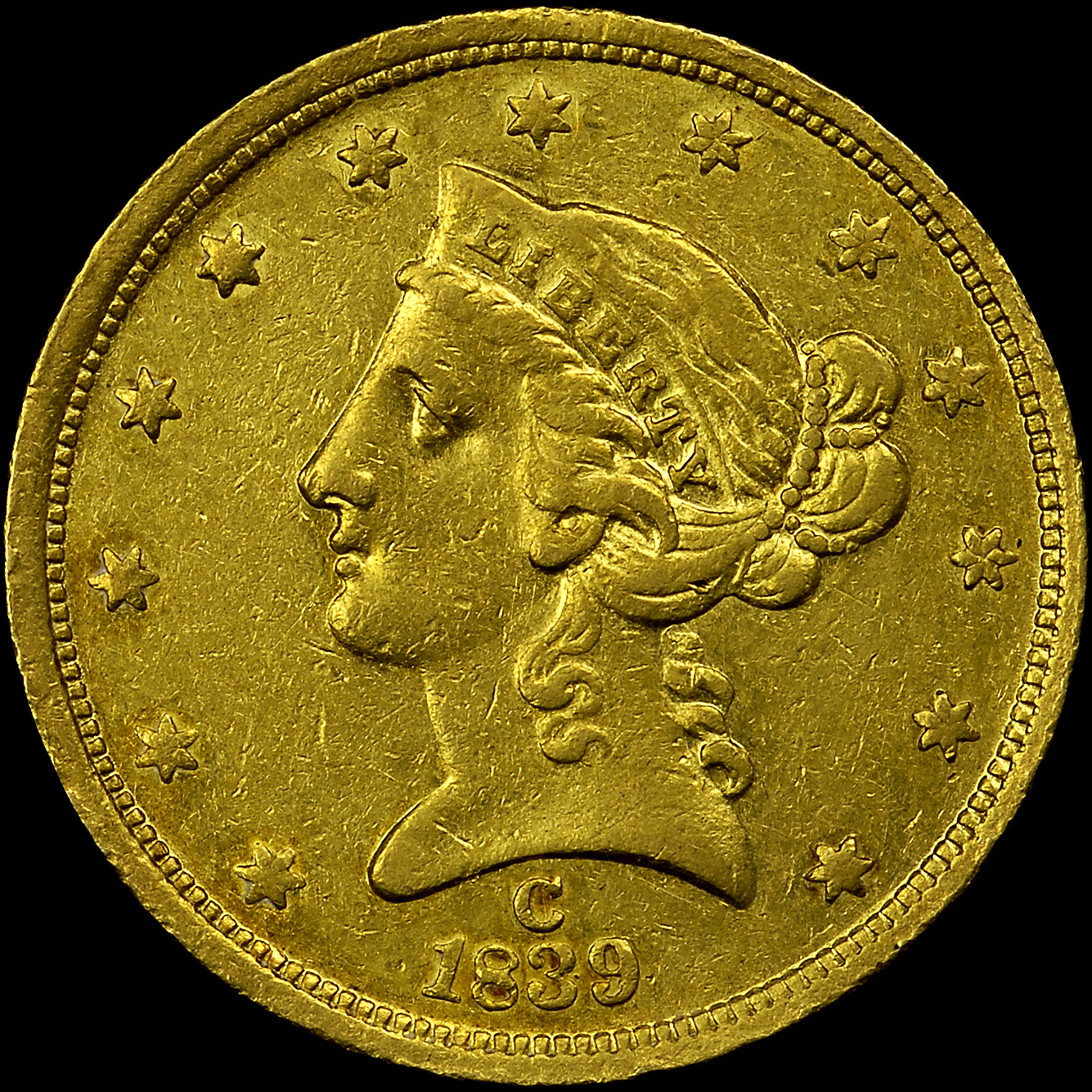
1839-C $5 Gold Coin

The Carolina gold rush, the first gold rush in the United States, followed the discovery of a large gold nugget in North Carolina in 1799, by a 12-year-old boy named Conrad Reed. He spotted the nugget while playing in Meadow Creek on his family's farm in Cabarrus County, North Carolina. Conrad took the 17-pound (7.7 kg) gold nugget home to show his father. However, gold was not commonly seen in their community and the value of the nugget was not understood. The nugget was used as a door stop in the family's home for several years. In 1802, Conrad's father, John Reed, showed the rock to a jeweler, who recognized it as gold and offered to buy it. Reed, still unaware of the real value of his "doorstop", sold it to the jeweler for US$3.50 (equivalent to $78.75 in 2025) (approximately one week's pay for a farm laborer at that time). The large nugget's true value was around US$3,600 (equivalent to $81,000 in 2025).

== History ==
After learning of the value of the resource on his land, John Reed entered into a partnership with Federick Kisor, James Love, and Martin Phifer. In the year 1803, the men found a nugget weighing 28 pounds (13 kg). News of the discovery was quickly spread by regional newspapers, and land owners across the area began to search for gold on their property. Nearly all of the land was privately owned and the beginning of the Carolina gold rush was largely conducted by farmers at the end of the growing season each year. These farmers were capable of conducting shallow surface mining of the stream-beds known as placer mining. However, by the late 1820s these placer deposits had been exhausted and the first lode mine shaft was excavated in pursuit of a gold-containing quartz vein in 1825 by Matthias Barringer in Montgomery County, North Carolina (now Montgomery and Stanly counties). With this progression of mining technique, the profession of mining became a necessity as tunnels and ventilation issues were outside the skill set of land owning farmers.

By the 1830s placer mining had been nearly entirely replaced by the more technical lode mining, including at the Reed mine; with this development came opportunity for immigrants from southern England. The region of Cornwall had produced miners for decades, who skillfully extracted the copper and tin from their deep mines until, by the early 19th century, those deposits became exhausted. Learning of new opportunity in North Carolina many of these miners immigrated in pursuit of work and brought their expertise with them. Some of the ore mills built in the Carolinas can be seen to resemble the design of the old mines in Cornwall. The expertise that these miners taught to the Carolina men spread throughout the region as men sought gold across the Carolina terrane. The establishment of a skilled and experienced workforce from this Carolina gold rush can be directly credited for the success of the much larger gold rush of 1849 in California, which drew many of these now skilled miners West.

Over 2,500 ounces of gold was deposited in the Philadelphia Mint by 1824. Due to the bountiful gold production in the Carolinas, the Charlotte Mint was built in Charlotte and opened for business on July 27, 1837.

== See also ==
- Charlotte Mint – Historic mint in North Carolina, United States
- Dahlonega Mint – Former branch of the United States Mint in Dahlonega, Georgia
- Georgia Gold Belt – Area of gold deposits in the Southeast United States
- Georgia Gold Rush – Discovery of gold in Georgia, US
