= Table tennis at the 2024 Summer Olympics – Qualification =

This article details the qualifying phase for table tennis at the 2024 Summer Olympics. The competition will comprise a total of 172 table tennis players, with an equal distribution between men and women coming from the different National Olympic Committees (NOCs), similar to those in the previous editions. Each NOC can enter a maximum of six table tennis players across five medal events (men's and women's singles; men's and women's teams, and mixed doubles) with a maximum of two each for the men's and women's singles. As the host nation, France reserves a spot each in the men's and women's teams, respectively, with one per gender competing in the singles tournament; and in the mixed doubles.

Each team event features a draw of sixteen NOCs with a trio of table tennis players. The initial half of the total quota will be awarded to the quarterfinalists at the 2024 ITTF World Teams Championships, scheduled for February 16 to 25 in Busan, South Korea, while six continental qualification tournaments (Africa, Asia, Europe, and Oceania, with the Americas divided between North and Latin for an ITTF competition) will offer the men's and women's team spot each to the top-ranked NOC from a respective continent. Apart from the host nation, the remaining slot will be attributed to the highest-ranked eligible NOC based on the ITTF World Team Ranking list of March 2024.

The mixed doubles tournament shares the same amount with the teams, consisting of sixteen NOCs with a pair of table tennis players. The initial quarter of the total quota will be awarded to the semifinalists of the designated qualifying meet, scheduled for March or April 2024, while six continental qualification tournaments (Africa, Asia, Europe, and Oceania, with the Americas divided between North and Latin for an ITTF competition) will offer the mixed doubles spot each to the top-ranked NOC from a respective continent. Apart from the host nation, the five highest-ranked eligible pairs will obtain the remaining berths to complete the field based on the ITTF World Ranking list of May 7, 2024.

About 70 table tennis players may participate in the men's and women's singles, depending on the number of slots available after the distribution of the mixed doubles quota. Each NOC can enter a maximum of four table tennis players (two per gender). Thirty-two places are reserved for each of the qualified men's and women's teams, with twenty-two more attributed to the individuals coming from NOCs without a qualified team through the continental meets organized by ITTF (four for Africa, six each for Asia and Europe, five for the Americas, and one for Oceania). A maximum of fifteen table tennis players will secure a spot through the ITTF World Singles Ranking list of June 18, 2024, respecting the four-player (two per gender) NOC limit, while the remaining men's and women's singles spots are entitled to the eligible NOCs interested to have their table tennis players compete for Paris 2024 under the Universality system.

== Summary ==
NOC	Men		Women		Mixed	Total
NOC	Singles	Team	Singles	Team	Doubles	Total
Algeria	1		1			2
Argentina	1		—			1
Australia	2	Yes	2	Yes	Yes	6
Austria	1		1			2
Belgium	2		—			2
Brazil	2	Yes	2	Yes	Yes	6
Cameroon	—		1			1
Canada	2	Yes	1			4
Chile	1		2			3
China	2	Yes	2	Yes	Yes	6
Chinese Taipei	2	Yes	2	Yes	Yes	6
Croatia	2	Yes	1			4
Cuba	1		—		Yes	3
Czech Republic	—		1			1
Denmark	2	Yes	—			3
Ecuador	1		—			1
Egypt	2	Yes	2	Yes	Yes	6
Fiji	1		—			1
France	2	Yes	2	Yes	Yes	6
Germany	2	Yes	2	Yes	Yes	6
Great Britain	1		1			2
Greece	1		—			1
Guyana	—		1			1
Hong Kong	1		2	Yes	Yes	4
Hungary	—		1		Yes	3
India	2	Yes	2	Yes		6
Iran	2		1			3
Italy	—		2			2
Japan	2	Yes	2	Yes	Yes	6
Jordan	1		—			1
Kazakhstan	1		—			1
Lebanon	—		1			1
Luxembourg	1		2			3
Madagascar	1		—			1
Maldives	—		1			1
Mexico	1		1			2
Moldova	1		—			1
Monaco	—		1			1
Nepal	1		—			1
Netherlands	—		1			1
Nigeria	2		2			4
North Korea	—		1		Yes	3
Poland	1		2	Yes		4
Portugal	2	Yes	2			5
Puerto Rico	2		1			3
Republic of the Congo	1		—			1
Romania	2		2	Yes	Yes	5
Senegal	1		—			1
Serbia	—		1			1
Singapore	1		2			3
Slovenia	2	Yes	—			3
Slovakia	1		—			1
South Korea	2	Yes	2	Yes	Yes	6
Spain	1		1		Yes	2
Sweden	2	Yes	2	Yes	Yes	6
Thailand	—		2	Yes		3
Turkey	—		1			1
Ukraine	1		2			3
United States	1		2	Yes		4
Vanuatu	—		1			1
Total: 60 NOCs	67	16	67	16	16	172

- NOC not qualified in teams and mixed doubles are represented in grey.
- NOC who qualified in teams will automatically obtain two singles quota.

== Timeline ==
The following table outlines a timeline of the qualification events for table tennis at the 2024 Summer Olympics.

Event	Date	Venue
Teams
2023 Oceania Senior Championships	September 2–9, 2023	(Australia) Townsville
2023 Asian Championships	September 3–10, 2023	(South Korea) Pyeongchang
2023 European Team Championships	September 10–17, 2023	(Sweden) Malmö
2023 Pan American Championships	September 10–17, 2023	(Cuba) Havana
2023 African Championships	September 11–17, 2023	(Tunisia) Tunis
2024 ITTF World Team Championships	February 16–25, 2024	(South Korea) Busan
ITTF World Team Rankings	March 2024	—
Mixed doubles
2023 European Games	June 23 – July 1, 2023	(Poland) Kraków
2023 Oceania Senior Championships	September 2–9, 2023	(Australia) Townsville
2023 Asian Championships	September 3–10, 2023	(South Korea) Pyeongchang
2023 African Championships	September 11–17, 2023	(Tunisia) Tunis
2023 Pan American Games	October 29 – November 5, 2023	(Chile) Santiago
2024 ITTF World Olympic Qualification Tournament	April 11–12, 2024	(Czech Republic) Havířov
ITTF World Mixed Doubles Rankings	May 7, 2024	—
Singles
South East Asian Qualification Tournament	May 8–10, 2024	(Thailand) Bangkok
Oceania Qualification Tournament	May 10, 2024	(New Caledonia) Nouméa
South Asian Qualification Tournament	May 13–15, 2024	(Nepal) Kathmandu
Pan American Qualification Tournament	May 14–18, 2024	(Peru) Lima
African Qualification Tournament	May 16–18, 2024	(Rwanda) Kigali
European Qualification Tournament	May 15–19, 2024	(Bosnia and Herzegovina) Sarajevo
West Asian Qualification Tournament	May 17–19, 2024	(Iraq) Sulaymaniyah
Central Asian Qualification Tournament	May 17–19, 2024	(Uzbekistan) Tashkent
East Asian Qualification Tournament	—	—
ITTF Continental Singles Rankings	June 11, 2024	—
ITTF World Singles Rankings	June 18, 2024	—

== Events ==
=== Men's team ===
Event	Places	Qualified team	Selected players
Host nation	1	France	Simon Gauzy; Alexis Lebrun; Félix Lebrun
2023 Oceania Championships	1	Australia	Bae Hwan; Nicholas Lum; Finn Luu
2023 Asian Championships	1	China	Fan Zhendong; Ma Long; Wang Chuqin
2023 European Team Championships	1	Sweden	Anton Källberg; Kristian Karlsson; Truls Möregårdh
2023 Pan American Championships	2	Brazil	Hugo Calderano; Vitor Ishiy; Guilherme Teodoro
2023 Pan American Championships	2	Canada	Jeremy Hazin; Edward Ly; Eugene Wang
2023 African Championships	1	Egypt	Youssef Abdel-Aziz; Omar Assar; Mohamed El-Beiali
2024 ITTF World Championships	6	Japan	Tomokazu Harimoto; Hiroto Shinozuka; Shunsuke Togami
2024 ITTF World Championships	6	South Korea	Cho Dae-seong; Jang Woo-jin; Lim Jong-hoon
2024 ITTF World Championships	6	Portugal	Tiago Apolónia; Marcos Freitas; João Geraldo
2024 ITTF World Championships	6	Germany	Timo Boll; Dimitrij Ovtcharov; Dang Qiu
2024 ITTF World Championships	6	Chinese Taipei	Chuang Chih-yuan; Kao Cheng-jui; Lin Yun-ju
2024 ITTF World Championships	6	Denmark	Martin Buch Andersen; Jonathan Groth; Anders Lind
ITTF World Rankings	3	Slovenia	Peter Hribar; Darko Jorgić; Deni Kožul
ITTF World Rankings	3	Croatia	Andrej Gaćina; Tomislav Pucar; Filip Zeljko
ITTF World Rankings	3	India	Sharath Kamal Achanta; Harmeet Desai; Manav Thakkar
Total	16		

- Italic: Qualified only for the team event.

=== Women's team ===
Event	Places	Qualified team	Selected players
Host nation	1	France	Charlotte Lutz; Prithika Pavade; Jia Nan Yuan
2023 Oceania Championships	1	Australia	Michelle Bromley; Minhyung Jee; Melissa Tapper
2023 Asian Championships	1	China	Chen Meng; Sun Yingsha; Wang Manyu
2023 European Team Championships	1	Germany	~~Han Ying~~; Annett Kaufmann (Note: Han Ying, originally set to compete in the women's singles and team event, was replaced by Annett Kaufmann after suffering an injury in a competition prior to the Olympics.); Nina Mittelham; Shan Xiaona
2023 Pan American Championships	2	United States	Rachel Sung; Amy Wang; Lily Zhang
2023 Pan American Championships	2	Brazil	Bruna Alexandre; Bruna Takahashi; Giulia Takahashi
2023 African Championships	1	Egypt	Mariam Alhodaby; Hana Goda; Dina Meshref
2024 ITTF World Championships	5	South Korea	Jeon Ji-hee; Lee Eun-hye; Shin Yu-bin
2024 ITTF World Championships	5	Chinese Taipei	Chen Szu-yu; Cheng I-ching; Chien Tung-chuan
2024 ITTF World Championships	5	Hong Kong	Doo Hoi Kem; Lee Ho Ching; Zhu Chengzhu
2024 ITTF World Championships	5	Japan	Miwa Harimoto; Hina Hayata; Miu Hirano
2024 ITTF World Championships	5	Romania	Adina Diaconu; Elizabeta Samara; Bernadette Szőcs
ITTF World Rankings	4	Thailand	Orawan Paranang; Jinnipa Sawettabut; Suthasini Sawettabut
ITTF World Rankings	4	Poland	Natalia Bajor; Katarzyna Węgrzyn; Zuzanna Wielgos
ITTF World Rankings	4	India	Sreeja Akula; Manika Batra; Archana Kamath
ITTF World Rankings	4	Sweden	Filippa Bergand; Linda Bergström; Christina Källberg
Total	16		

- Italic: Qualified only for the team event.

=== Mixed doubles ===
Event	Places	Qualified NOC	Selected players
Host nation	1	France	Alexis Lebrun; Jia Nan Yuan
2023 European Games	1	Germany	Dang Qiu; Nina Mittelham
2023 Asian Championships (Note: Lin Gaoyuan & Wang Yidi earned a slot for China after winning the 2023 Asian Table Tennis Championships mixed doubles. Since China adopt their own Olympics ranking system, the quota was declined and it was relocated to world ranking.)	~~1~~	~~China~~	—
2023 Oceanian Championships	1	Australia	Nicholas Lum; Minhyung Jee
2023 African Championships	1	Egypt	Omar Assar; Dina Meshref
2023 Pan American Games	2	Brazil	Vitor Ishiy; Bruna Takahashi
2023 Pan American Games	2	Cuba	Jorge Campos; Daniela Fonseca
ITTF World Olympic Qualification Tournament	4	North Korea	Ri Jong-sik; Kim Kum-yong
ITTF World Olympic Qualification Tournament	4	Hong Kong	Wong Chun Ting; Doo Hoi Kem
ITTF World Olympic Qualification Tournament	4	Spain	Álvaro Robles; María Xiao
ITTF World Olympic Qualification Tournament	4	Sweden	Kristian Karlsson; Christina Källberg
ITTF World Rankings	6	China	Wang Chuqin; Sun Yingsha
ITTF World Rankings	6	Japan	Tomokazu Harimoto; Hina Hayata
ITTF World Rankings	6	South Korea	Lim Jong-hoon; Shin Yu-bin
ITTF World Rankings	6	Romania	Ovidiu Ionescu; Bernadette Szőcs
ITTF World Rankings	6	Chinese Taipei	Lin Yun-ju; Chen Szu-yu
ITTF World Rankings	6	Hungary	Nándor Ecseki; Dóra Madarász
Total	16		

=== Men's singles ===
Event	Places	Qualified players
Qualified teams (2 individuals per team)	32	Australia; Brazil; Canada; China; Chinese Taipei; Croatia; Denmark; Egypt; France; Germany; India; Japan; Portugal; Slovenia; South Korea; Sweden
Southeast Asian Qualification Tournament	1	Izaac Quek (SGP)
Oceania Qualification Tournament	~~1~~	~~Alfred Dela Pena (NZL)~~ (Note: The quota was originally obtained by Alfred Dela Pena from New Zealand. The quota was declined due to not confirmed by deadline. This slot will be allocated to the highest ITTF Oceania player on June 18, 2024.)
South Asian Qualification Tournament	1	Santoo Shrestha (NEP)
African Qualification Tournament	3	Olajide Omotayo (NGR); Fabio Rakotoarimanana (MAD); Mehdi Bouloussa (ALG)
Pan American Qualification Tournament	4	Santiago Lorenzo (ARG); Marcos Madrid (MEX); Kanak Jha (USA); Andy Pereira (CUB)
European Qualification Tournament	5	Miłosz Redzimski (POL); Panagiotis Gionis (GRE); Vladislav Ursu (MDA); Yaroslav Zhmudenko (UKR); Wang Yang (SVK)
Central Asian Qualification Tournament	1	Nima Alamian (IRI)
West Asian Qualification Tournament	1	Zaid Abo Yaman (JOR)
East Asian Qualification Tournament	1	Wong Chun Ting (HKG) (Note: The East Asian Qualification Tournament was not played due to limited participants. Therefore, Wong Chun Ting, who ranked first in the region, obtained the East Asian quota.)
African Top Ranking (June 11, 2024)	1	Quadri Aruna (NGR)
American Top Ranking (June 11, 2024)	1	Nicolás Burgos (CHI)
Asian Top Ranking (June 11, 2024)	1	Kirill Gerassimenko (KAZ)
European Top Ranking (June 11, 2024)	1	Álvaro Robles (ESP)
Oceanian Top Ranking	1	~~Roger Wang (NZL)~~; Vicky Wu (FIJ)
ITTF World Rankings	12	Liam Pitchford (GBR); Ovidiu Ionescu (ROU); Noshad Alamian (IRI); Daniel Habesohn (AUT); Eduard Ionescu (ROU); Brian Afanador (PUR); Martin Allegro (BEL); Alberto Miño (ECU); Ibrahima Diaw (SEN); Daniel González (PUR); Luka Mladenovic (LUX); Cedric Nuytinck (BEL)
Universality Places	1	Saheed Idowu (CGO)
Total	67	

=== Women's singles ===
Event	Places	Qualified players
Qualified teams (2 individuals per team)	32	Australia; Brazil; China; Chinese Taipei; Egypt; France; Germany; Hong Kong; India; Japan; Poland; Romania; South Korea; Sweden; Thailand; United States
Southeast Asian Qualification Tournament	1	Zeng Jian (SGP)
Oceania Qualification Tournament	1	Priscila Tommy (VAN)
South Asian Qualification Tournament	1	Fathimath Dheema Ali (MDV)
African Qualification Tournament	3	Offiong Edem (NGR); Sarah Hanffou (CMR); Fatimo Bello (NGR)
Pan American Qualification Tournament	4	Zhang Mo (CAN); María Paulina Vega (CHI); Zhiying Zeng (CHI); Arantxa Cossío Aceves (MEX)
European Qualification Tournament	5	Anna Hursey (GBR); Britt Eerland (NED); Shao Jieni (POR); Fu Yu (POR); Margaryta Pesotska (UKR)
Central Asian Qualification Tournament	1	Neda Shahsavari (IRI)
West Asian Qualification Tournament	1	Mariana Sahakian (LBN)
East Asian Qualification Tournament	1	Pyon Song-gyong (PRK) (Note: The East Asian Qualification Tournament was not played due to limited participants. Therefore, Pyon Song-Gyong, who ranked first in the region, obtained the East Asian quota.)
African Top Ranking (June 11, 2024)	1	Lynda Loghraibi (ALG)
American Top Ranking (June 11, 2024)	1	Adriana Díaz (PUR)
Asian Top Ranking (June 11, 2024)	1	Zhou Jingyi (SGP)
European Top Ranking (June 11, 2024)	1	Yang Xiaoxin (MON)
ITTF World Rankings	12	Sofia Polcanova (AUT); Ni Xia Lian (LUX); Giorgia Piccolin (ITA); María Xiao (ESP); Georgina Póta (HUN); Ivana Malobabić (CRO); Hana Matelová (CZE); Izabela Lupulesku (SRB); Debora Vivarelli (ITA); Sarah De Nutte (LUX); Sibel Altınkaya (TUR); Solomiya Brateyko (UKR)
Universality Places	1	Chelsea Edghill (GUY)
Total	67	
