= Table tennis at the 2024 Summer Olympics – Women's singles =

Table tennis – Women's singles at the Games of the XXXIII Olympiad
- Venue: Paris Expo Porte de Versailles
- Date: 27 July – 3 August
- Competitors: 67 from 51 nations

Medalists
1st place, gold medalist(s)		Chen Meng	China
2nd place, silver medalist(s)		Sun Yingsha	China
3rd place, bronze medalist(s)		Hina Hayata	Japan

The women's singles table tennis event was part of the table tennis programme at the 2024 Summer Olympics in Paris. The event took place from 27 July to 3 August 2024 at Paris Expo Porte de Versailles.

== Schedule ==
Legend
P	Preliminary round	¼	Quarter-finals	½	Semi-finals	F	Final

Sat 27	Sun 28	Mon 29	Tue 30	Wed 31	Thu 1	Fri 2	Sat 3
P					¼	½	F

== Seeds ==
Since there were more than 64 athletes, seeded players 1 to 32 were drawn directly to the top position in round of 64. Seeded players 33 to 48 were drawn in the remaining position of round of 64.

1. Sun Yingsha (CHN) (final, silver medalist)
2. Chen Meng (CHN) (champion, gold medalist)
3. Hina Hayata (JPN) (semifinals, bronze medalist)
4. Shin Yu-bin (KOR) (semifinals, fourth place)
5. Bernadette Szőcs (ROU) (round of 16)
6. Adriana Díaz (PUR) (round of 16)
7. Cheng I-ching (TPE) (quarterfinals)
8. Miu Hirano (JPN) (quarterfinals)
9. Jeon Ji-hee (KOR) (first round)
10. Yang Xiaoxin (MON) (first round)
11. Nina Mittelham (GER) (second round)
12. Prithika Pavade (FRA) (second round)
13. Jia Nan Yuan (FRA) (round of 16)
14. Bruna Takahashi (BRA) (second round)
15. Sofia Polcanova (AUT) (quarterfinals)
16. Sreeja Akula (IND) (round of 16)
17. Dina Meshref (EGY) (second round)
18. Manika Batra (IND) (round of 16)
19. Lily Zhang (USA) (round of 16)
20. Hana Goda (EGY) (first round)
21. Linda Bergström (SWE) (second round)
22. Orawan Paranang (THA) (first round)
23. Amy Wang (USA) (second round)
24. Shan Xiaona (GER) (first round)
25. Elizabeta Samara (ROU) (second round)
26. Chien Tung-chuan (TPE) (first round)
27. Doo Hoi Kem (HKG) (first round)
28. Natalia Bajor (POL) (round of 16)
29. Mo Zhang (CAN) (second round)
30. Shao Jieni (POR) (second round)
31. Zeng Jian (SGP) (second round)
32. Ni Xia Lian (LUX) (second round)
33. Suthasini Sawettabut (THA) (first round)
34. Christina Källberg (SWE) (first round)
35. Min Hyung Jee (AUS) (first round)
36. Zhu Chengzhu (HKG) (second round)
37. Giorgia Piccolin (ITA) (first round)
38. María Xiao (ESP) (first round)
39. Georgina Póta (HUN) (second round)
40. Ivana Malobabić (CRO) (first round)
41. Britt Eerland (NED) (round of 16)
42. Hana Matelová (CZE) (second round)
43. Fu Yu (POR) (second round)
44. Izabela Lupulesku (SRB) (first round)
45. Debora Vivarelli (ITA) (first round)
46. Margaryta Pesotska (UKR) (second round)
47. Giulia Takahashi (BRA) (first round)
48. Sarah De Nutte (LUX) (first round)

The 49 to 64 seeded players will be allocated into the top place of preliminary round. If they are drawn with no opponent in preliminary round, they will get a bye and advance to round of 64.

49. Sibel Altınkaya (TUR) (first round)
50. Solomiya Brateyko (UKR) (first round)
51. Anna Hursey (GBR) (first round)
52. Arantxa Cossio Aceves (MEX) (first round)
53. Edem Offiong (NGR) (first round)
54. Zhou Jingyi (SGP) (first round)
55. Priscilla Tommy (VAN) (first round)
56. Sarah Hanffou (CMR) (first round)
57. Katarzyna Wegrzyn (POL) (first round)
58. Paulina Vega (CHI) (first round)
59. Fatimo Bello (NGR) (first round)
60. Zhiying Zeng (CHI) (preliminary round)
61. Lynda Loghraibi (ALG) (first round)
62. Pyon Song-gyong (PRK)(quarterfinals)
63. Melissa Tapper (AUS) (first round)
64. Neda Shahsavari (IRI) (first round)

The 65 to 67 seeded players were allocated into the bottom place of preliminary round:

65. Chelsea Edghill (GUY) (preliminary round)
66. Fathimath Dheema Ali (MDV) (preliminary round)
67. Mariana Sahakian (LBN) (first round)

== Draw ==
The draw was held on 24 July 2024.

=== Finals ===
Semifinals
1	Sun Yingsha (CHN)	11	11	11	11
3	Hina Hayata (JPN)	6	8	8	2
4	Shin Yu-bin (KOR)	7	6	7	7
2	Chen Meng (CHN)	11	11	11	11

Gold medal match
1	Sun Yingsha (CHN) (silver)	11	7	4	11	9	6
2	Chen Meng (CHN) (gold)	4	11	11	9	11	11
Bronze medal match
3	Hina Hayata (JPN) (bronze)	9	13	12	11	10	11
4	Shin Yu-bin (KOR)	11	11	10	7	12	7

=== Top half ===
==== Section 1 ====
Round of 64
1	Sun Y.S. (CHN)	11	11	11	11
47	G. Takahashi (BRA)	3	6	6	5
49	S. Altınkaya (TUR)	10	3	7	11	12	6
32	Ni X.L. (LUX)	12	11	11	9	10	11
31	Zeng J. (SGP)	11	11	11	11	9	13	11
40	I. Malobabić (CRO)	5	3	13	6	11	15	5
34	C. Källberg (SWE)	4	9	7	8
16	S. Akula (IND)	11	11	11	11
9	Jeon J.H. (KOR)	7	6	11	9
43	Fu Y. (POR)	11	11	13	11
33	S. Sawettabut (THA)	8	11	11	7	10	11	6
28	N. Bajor (POL)	11	3	8	11	12	5	11
25	E. Samara (ROU)	6	11	8	11	13	9	11
50	S. Brateyko (UKR)	11	3	11	9	11	11	4
56	S. Hanffou (CMR)	10	5	1	12
7	Cheng I.C. (TPE)	12	11	11	14

Round of 32
1	Sun Y.S. (CHN)	11	11	13	11
32	Ni X.L. (LUX)	5	1	11	4
31	Zeng J. (SGP)	11	10	4	5	12	10
16	S. Akula (IND)	9	12	11	11	10	12
43	Fu Y. (POR)	7	8	17	11	11	10	8
28	N. Bajor (POL)	11	11	15	4	7	12	11
25	E. Samara (ROU)	3	11	8	9	11	13
7	Cheng I.C. (TPE)	11	9	11	11	5	15

Round of 16
1	Sun Y.S. (CHN)	12	12	11	11
16	S. Akula (IND)	10	10	8	3
28	N. Bajor (POL)	2	8	8	9
7	Cheng I.C. (TPE)	11	11	11	11

Quarterfinals
1	Sun Y.S. (CHN)	11	11	19	11
7	Cheng I.C. (TPE)	7	4	17	5

==== Section 2 ====
Round of 64
6	A. Díaz (PUR)	11	11	11	11
44	I. Lupulesku (SRB)	9	5	8	7
55	P. Tommy (VAN)	7	8	9	5
23	A. Wang (USA)	11	11	11	11
27	Doo H.K. (HKG)	8	7	12	7	4
62	Pyon S.G. (PRK)	11	11	10	11	11
35	M.H. Jee (AUS)	7	9	7	8
11	N. Mittelham (GER)	11	11	11	11
13	J.N. Yuan (FRA)	11	11	11	11
59	F. Bello (NGR)	1	3	3	5
58	P. Vega (CHI)	7	5	7	8
29	M. Zhang (CAN)	11	11	11	11
17	D. Meshref (EGY)	11	11	11	9	11
38	M. Xiao (ESP)	5	4	6	11	8
45	D. Vivarelli (ITA)	1	3	4	5
3	H. Hayata (JPN)	11	11	11	11

Round of 32
6	A. Díaz (PUR)	9	7	12	14	11	11
23	A. Wang (USA)	11	11	10	12	8	7
62	Pyon S.G. (PRK)	6	9	11	11	11	7	11
11	N. Mittelham (GER)	11	11	9	8	8	11	7
13	J.N. Yuan (FRA)	9	11	11	11	11
29	M. Zhang (CAN)	11	6	5	4	7
17	D. Meshref (EGY)	13	10	3	9
3	H. Hayata (JPN)	15	12	11	11

Round of 16
6	A. Díaz (PUR)	11	11	11	9	8	6	7
62	Pyon S.G. (PRK)	6	6	9	11	11	11	11
13	J.N. Yuan (FRA)	11	6	8	6
3	H. Hayata (JPN)	13	11	11	11

Quarterfinals
62	Pyon S.G. (PRK)	5	5	15	8	11	11	6
3	H. Hayata (JPN)	11	11	13	11	9	4	11

=== Bottom half ===
==== Section 3 ====
Round of 64
4	Shin Y.B. (KOR)	14	11	11	11
63	M. Tapper (AUS)	12	4	3	6
39	G. Póta (HUN)	11	7	10	6	11	11	11
24	X.N. Shan (GER)	7	11	12	11	6	6	8
19	L. Zhang (USA)	11	11	11	11
67	M. Sahakian (LBN)	7	6	4	6
53	E. Offiong (NGR)	8	4	11	10
14	B. Takahashi (BRA)	11	11	13	12
12	P. Pavade (FRA)	11	9	11	11	14
64	N. Shahsavari (IRI)	4	11	7	4	12
51	A. Hursey (GBR)	8	10	9	11	5
18	M. Batra (IND)	11	12	11	9	11
26	Chien T.C. (TPE)	7	7	7	10
36	Zhu C.Z. (HKG)	11	11	11	12
37	G. Piccolin (ITA)	9	5	5	7
8	M. Hirano (JPN)	11	11	11	11

Round of 32
4	Shin Y.B. (KOR)	9	11	11	11	11
39	G. Póta (HUN)	11	9	4	1	9
19	L. Zhang (USA)	11	11	9	8	11	11
14	B. Takahashi (BRA)	8	7	11	11	8	8
12	P. Pavade (FRA)	9	6	9	7
18	M. Batra (IND)	11	11	11	11
36	Zhu C.Z. (HKG)	11	5	8	9
8	M. Hirano (JPN)	13	11	11	11

Round of 16
4	Shin Y.B. (KOR)	11	11	11	15
19	L. Zhang (USA)	2	8	4	13
18	M. Batra (IND)	6	9	14	8	6
8	M. Hirano (JPN)	11	11	12	11	11

Quarterfinals
4	Shin Y.B. (KOR)	11	11	11	7	8	9	13
8	M. Hirano (JPN)	4	7	5	11	11	11	11

==== Section 4 ====
Round of 64
5	B. Szőcs (ROU)	9	11	11	11	11
54	Zhou J.Y. (SGP)	11	4	3	7	9
46	M. Pesotska (UKR)	11	9	9	11	11	7	11
22	O. Paranang (THA)	2	11	11	6	4	11	5
30	J.N. Shao (POR)	11	11	5	7	11	11
48	S. De Nutte (LUX)	7	9	11	11	8	5
52	A. Cossío (MEX)	4	3	4	8
15	S. Polcanova (AUT)	11	11	11	11
10	X.X. Yang (MON)	13	2	11	11	5	7
42	H. Matelová (CZE)	15	11	8	6	11	11
41	B. Eerland (NED)	11	13	11	11
20	H. Goda (EGY)	9	11	6	6
21	L. Bergström (SWE)	11	9	14	11	11
57	K. Wegrzyn (POL)	7	11	12	7	6
61	L. Loghraibi (ALG)	2	4	5	2
2	Chen M. (CHN)	11	11	11	11

Round of 32
5	B. Szőcs (ROU)	12	11	12	14	11
46	M. Pesotska (UKR)	14	5	10	12	4
30	J.N. Shao (POR)	12	9	7	3	14	7
15	S. Polcanova (AUT)	10	11	11	11	12	11
42	H. Matelová (CZE)	11	11	12	11	8	9	9
41	B. Eerland (NED)	13	8	10	9	11	11	11
21	L. Bergström (SWE)	11	4	7	9	8
2	Chen M. (CHN)	8	11	11	11	11

Round of 16
5	B. Szőcs (ROU)	10	4	11	9
15	S. Polcanova (AUT)	12	11	13	11
41	B. Eerland (NED)	11	5	6	4	8
2	Chen M. (CHN)	8	11	11	11	11

Quarterfinals
15	S. Polcanova (AUT)	5	3	0	8
2	Chen M. (CHN)	11	11	11	11

== Preliminary rounds ==
Preliminary round
56	S. Hanffou (CMR)	11	9	11	11	11
65	C. Edghill (GUY)	6	11	9	3	8

Preliminary round
60	Z.Y. Zeng (CHI)	11	12	5	3	8
67	M. Sahakian (LBN)	4	14	11	11	11

Preliminary round
57	K. Wegrzyn (POL)	11	11	11	11
66	F. Dheema Ali (MDV)	5	5	2	8
