= Table tennis at the 2024 Summer Paralympics – Qualification =

Qualification for table tennis at the 2024 Summer Paralympics begins on 1 January 2022 and ends on 31 March 2024. There will be 166 male and 114 female athlete quotas.

== Timeline ==
Means of qualification	Date	Venue	Berths
2023 VIRTUS Global Games	4–9 June 2023	(France) Vichy	2 qualified singles slots (Class 11 only); 1 male 1 female
2023 ITTF European Championships	4–9 September 2023	(United Kingdom) Sheffield	105 qualified singles slots 55 male 50 female
2023 ITTF African Championships	21–24 September 2023	(Egypt) Giza	105 qualified singles slots 55 male 50 female
2022 Asian Para Games	23–27 October 2023	(China) Hangzhou	105 qualified singles slots 55 male 50 female
2023 Parapan American Games	15–19 November 2023	(Chile) Santiago	105 qualified singles slots 55 male 50 female
2023 ITTF Oceania Championships	17–20 November 2023	(Solomon Islands) Honiara	105 qualified singles slots 55 male 50 female
ITTF PTT Singles Ranking List Allocation	1 April 2024	N/A	95 qualified singles slots 71 male 24 female
ITTF PTT Doubles Ranking List Allocation	1 April 2024	N/A	36 qualified individual slots 17 male 19 female
World Qualification Tournament	23–25 May 2024	(Thailand) Pattaya	21 qualified singles slots 11 male 10 female
Bipartite Commission Invitation Allocation	2 April – 13 May 2024	TBA	21 qualified singles slots 11 male 10 female
Total			280

== Quotas ==
The qualification slots are allocated to the individual athlete, not the NPC that they represent.

- An NPC can enter a maximum of two athletes in any of each individual medal event (33 male; 30 female).
- An NPC can enter a maximum of two eligible pairs per men's, women's and mixed doubles events, each pair made up of two eligible athletes who qualified in the singles events in their respective sports category.

=== Men's events ===
==== Class 1 ====
Competition	Berths	Qualified
European Para Championships	1	Endre Major (HUN)
African Para Championships	1	Eslam Raslan (EGY)
Asian Para Games	1	Joo Young-dae (KOR)
Parapan American Games	1	Yunier Fernández (CUB)
Oceania Para Championships	0	—
World Ranking Allocation (Singles)	4	Kim Hak-jin (KOR); Federico Falco (ITA); Rob Davies (GBR); Park Sung Joo (KOR)
World Qualification Tournament (Singles)	1	Andrea Borgato (ITA)
Bipartite Commission	1	Thomas Matthews (GBR)
Total	10	

==== Class 2 ====
Competition	Berths	Qualified
European Para Championships	1	Rafał Czuper (POL)
African Para Championships	1	Ahmed Elmahsy (EGY)
Asian Para Games	1	Park Jin-cheol (KOR)
Parapan American Games	1	Luis Flores (CHI)
Oceania Para Championships	0	—
World Ranking Allocation (Singles)	9	Fabien Lamirault (FRA); Peter Lovas (SVK); Jiří Suchánek (CZE); Federico Crosara (ITA); Ján Riapoš (SVK); Cha Soo-yong (KOR); Oleksandr Yezyk (UKR); Martin Ludrovsky (SVK)
World Ranking Allocation (Doubles)	4	Miguel Angel Toledo (ESP); Iker Sastre (ESP); Julien Michaud (FRA); Tomasz Jakimczuk (POL)
World Qualification Tournament (Singles)	1	Thirayu Chueawong (THA)
Bipartite Commission	1	Martin Zvolanek (CZE)
Total	18	

==== Class 3 ====
Competition	Berths	Qualified
European Para Championships	1	Thomas Schmidberger (GER)
African Para Championships	1	Khaled Ramadan (EGY)
Asian Para Games	1	Feng Panfeng (CHN)
Parapan American Games	1	Jenson Van Emburgh (USA)
Oceania Para Championships	1	Chen Junjian (AUS)
World Ranking Allocation (Singles)	11	Yuttajak Glinbanchuen (THA); Florian Merrien (FRA); Zhai Xiang (CHN); Jang Yeong-jin (KOR); Thomas Brüchle (GER); Baek Young-bok (KOR); Colin Judge (IRL); Alexander Öhgren (SWE); Maciej Nalepka (POL); Vasyl Petruniv (UKR); Gabriel Copola (ARG)
World Ranking Allocation (Doubles)	2	Roberto Eder Rodríguez (ESP); Petr Svatos (CZE)
World Qualification Tournament (Singles)	1	Sylvain Noël (FRA)
Bipartite Commission	1	Roberto Quijada (VEN)
Total	20	

==== Class 4 ====
Competition	Berths	Qualified
European Para Championships	1	Abdullah Öztürk (TUR)
African Para Championships	1	Isau Ogunkunle (NGR)
Asian Para Games	1	Wanchai Chaiwut (THA)
Parapan American Games	1	Maximiliano Rodríguez (CHI)
Oceania Para Championships	1	Christopher Addis (AUS)
World Ranking Allocation (Singles)	8	Kim Young-gun (KOR); Maxime Thomas (FRA); Kazuki Shichino (JPN); Kim Jung-gil (KOR); Filip Nachazel (CZE); Nesim Turan (TUR); Francisco López Sayago (ESP); Boris Trávníček (SVK)
World Ranking Allocation (Doubles)	1	Emeric Martin (FRA)
World Qualification Tournament (Singles)	1	Genki Saito (JPN)
Bipartite Commission	1	Peter Mihalik (SVK)
Total	16	

==== Class 5 ====
Competition	Berths	Qualified
European Para Championships	1	Valentin Baus (GER)
African Para Championships	1	Bolawa Akingbemisilu (NGR)
Asian Para Games	1	Liu Fu (CHN)
Parapan American Games	1	Elías Romero (ARG)
Oceania Para Championships	1	Zhi Ming Huo (AUS)
World Ranking Allocation (Singles)	4	Cheng Ming-chih (TPE); Tommy Urhaug (NOR); Ali Öztürk (TUR); Cao Ningning (CHN)
World Ranking Allocation (Doubles)	1	Mitar Palikuća (SRB)
World Qualification Tournament (Singles)	1	Nicolas Savant-Aira (FRA)
Bipartite Commission	1	Lucas Carvalhal Arabian (BRA)
Total	12	

==== Class 6 ====
Competition	Berths	Qualified
European Para Championships	1	Matteo Parenzan (ITA)
African Para Championships	1	Kayode Alabi (NGR)
Asian Para Games	1	Rungroj Thainiyom (THA)
Parapan American Games	1	Ian Seidenfeld (USA)
Oceania Para Championships	1	Trevor Hirth (AUS)
World Ranking Allocation (Singles)	7	Peter Rosenmeier (DEN); Álvaro Valera (ESP); Ignacio Torres (CHI); Thomas Rau (GER); Esteban Herrault (FRA); Martin Perry (GBR); Bobi Simion (ROU)
World Ranking Allocation (Doubles)	2	Paul Karabardak (GBR); Huang Jiaxin (CHN)
World Qualification Tournament (Singles)	1	Matías Pino (CHI)
Bipartite Commission	1	Chen Chao (CHN)
Total	16	

==== Class 7 ====
Competition	Berths	Qualified
European Para Championships	1	Will Bayley (GBR)
African Para Championships	1	Sayed Youssef (EGY)
Asian Para Games	1	Katsuyoshi Yagi (JPN)
Parapan American Games	1	Paulo Salmin (BRA)
Oceania Para Championships	1	Matthew Britz (NZL)
World Ranking Allocation (Singles)	7	Jean-Paul Montanus (NED); Chalermpong Punpoo (THA); Yan Shuo (CHN); Liao Keli (CHN); Jonas Hansson (SWE); Stéphane Messi (FRA); Kevin Dourbecker (FRA)
World Ranking Allocation (Doubles)	2	Israel Stroh (BRA); Jordi Morales (ESP)
World Qualification Tournament (Singles)	1	Bjoern Schnake (GER)
Bipartite Commission	1	Ben Despineux (BEL)
Total	16	

==== Class 8 ====
Competition	Berths	Qualified
European Para Championships	1	Viktor Didukh (UKR)
African Para Championships	1	Victor Farinloye (NGR)
Asian Para Games	1	Zhao Shuai (CHN)
Parapan American Games	1	Luiz Filipe Guarnieri Manara (BRA)
Oceania Para Championships	1	Nathan Pellissier (AUS)
World Ranking Allocation (Singles)	10	Aaron McKibbin (GBR); Clément Berthier (FRA); Emil Andersson (SWE); Maksym Nikolenko (UKR); Piotr Grudzień (POL); Thomas Bouvais (FRA); Billy Shilton (GBR); Phisit Wangphonphathanasiri (THA); Richard Csejtey (SVK); Peng Weinan (CHN)
World Ranking Allocation (Doubles)	3	Marc Ledoux (BEL); Maksym Chudzicki (POL); Alejandro Díaz Tirado (ESP)
World Qualification Tournament (Singles)	1	Borna Zohil (CRO)
Bipartite Commission	1	Ali Makhulbekov (KAZ)
Total	20	

==== Class 9 ====
Competition	Berths	Qualified
European Para Championships	1	Laurens Devos (BEL)
African Para Championships	1	Abiola Wali Adesope (NGR)
Asian Para Games	1	Zhao Yiqing (CHN)
Parapan American Games	1	Tahl Leibovitz (USA)
Oceania Para Championships	1	Ma Lin (AUS)
World Ranking Allocation (Singles)	6	Daniel Gustafsson (SWE); Ander Cepas (ESP); Ivan Mai (UKR); Jorge Cardona (ESP); Lucas Didier (FRA); Lev Kats (UKR)
World Ranking Allocation (Doubles)	1	Joshua Stacey (GBR)
World Qualification Tournament (Singles)	1	Liu Chaodong (CHN)
Bipartite Commission	1	Koyo Iwabuchi (JPN)
Total	14	

==== Class 10 ====
Competition	Berths	Qualified
European Para Championships	1	Patryk Chojnowski (POL)
African Para Championships	1	Alabi Olabiyi Olufemi (NGR)
Asian Para Games	1	Lian Hao (CHN)
Parapan American Games	1	Cláudio Massad (BRA)
Oceania Para Championships	0	—
World Ranking Allocation (Singles)	7	Filip Radović (MNE); Matéo Bohéas (FRA); José Manuel Ruiz Reyes (ESP); Igor Misztal (POL); Krisztian Gardos (AUT); Luka Bakić (MNE); Mahiro Funayama (JPN)
World Ranking Allocation (Doubles)	1	Bunpot Sillapakong (THA)
World Qualification Tournament (Singles)	1	Ivan Karpov (NPA)
Bipartite Commission	1	Manuel Echaveguren (CHI)
Total	14	

==== Class 11 ====
Competition	Berths	Qualified
Global Games	1	Chen Po-yen (TPE)
European Para Championships	1	Florian Van Acker (BEL)
African Para Championships	1	Abdelrahman Bahgat (EGY)
Asian Para Games	0	—
Parapan American Games	1	Thiago Simões (BRA)
Oceania Para Championships	1	Samuel Von Einem (AUS)
World Ranking Allocation (Singles)	6	Lucas Créange (FRA); Kim Gi-tae (KOR); Péter Pálos (HUN)
World Qualification Tournament (Singles)	1	Takeshi Takemori (JPN)
Bipartite Commission	1	Leung Chung Yan (HKG)
Total	10	

=== Women's events ===
==== Class 1-2 ====
Women in classes 1 and 2 will compete in a combined event. Quotas for each class will be assigned separately.

Competition	Class 1 Berths	Qualified
World Ranking Allocation (Singles)	3	Dorota Bucław (POL); Aino Tapola (FIN); Jana Spegel (GER)
Competition	Class 2 Berths	Qualified
European Para Championships	1	Giada Rossi (ITA)
African Para Championships	1	Ola Soliman (EGY)
Asian Para Games	1	Seo Su-yeon (KOR)
Parapan American Games	1	Cátia Oliveira (BRA)
Oceania Para Championships	1	Hayley Sands (AUS)
World Ranking Allocation (Singles)	1	Liu Jing (CHN)
World Ranking Allocation (Doubles)	1	Chilchitraryak Bootwansirina (THA)
Bipartite Commission	1	Carla Maia Limp de Azevedo (BRA)
Competition	Class 1-2 Berth	Qualified
World Qualification Tournament (Singles)	1	Maria Garrone (ARG)
Total	11	

==== Class 3 ====
Competition	Berths	Qualified
European Para Championships	1	Anđela Mužinić Vincetić (CRO)
African Para Championships	1	Fawzia Elshamy (EGY)
Asian Para Games	1	Yoon Ji-yu (KOR)
Parapan American Games	1	Marliane Amaral Santos (BRA)
Oceania Para Championships	0	—
World Ranking Allocation (Singles)	6	Xue Juan (CHN); Carlotta Ragazzini (ITA); Lee Mi-gyu (KOR); Alena Kánová (SVK); Joyce de Oliveira (BRA); Dararat Asayut (THA)
World Ranking Allocation (Doubles)	3	Michela Brunelli (ITA); Helena Dretar Karic (CRO); Sonalben Patel (IND)
World Qualification Tournament (Singles)	1	Patamawadee Intanon (THA)
Bipartite Commission	1	Hatice Duman (TUR)
Total	15	

==== Class 4 ====
Competition	Berths	Qualified
European Para Championships	1	Borislava Perić (SRB)
African Para Championships	1	Mona Abdelhak (EGY)
Asian Para Games	1	Gu Xiaodan (CHN)
Parapan American Games	1	Martha Verdin (MEX)
Oceania Para Championships	1	Daniela di Toro (AUS)
World Ranking Allocation (Singles)	3	Sandra Mikolaschek (GER); Bhavina Patel (IND); Zhou Ying (CHN)
World Ranking Allocation (Doubles)	2	Nada Matić (SRB); Flora Vautier (FRA)
World Qualification Tournament (Singles)	1	Wijittra Jaion (THA)
Bipartite Commission	2	Ghalia Alanazi (KSA); Megan Shackleton (GBR)
Total	13	

==== Class 5 ====
Competition	Berths	Qualified
European Para Championships	1	Alexandra Saint-Pierre (FRA)
African Para Championships	1	Ifechukwude Ikpeoyi (NGR)
Asian Para Games	1	Pan Jiamin (CHN)
Parapan American Games	1	Tamara Leonelli (CHI)
Oceania Para Championships	0	—
World Ranking Allocation (Singles)	4	Zhang Bian (CHN); Jung Young-a (KOR); Moon Sung-hye (KOR)
World Ranking Allocation (Doubles)	1	Panwas Sringam (THA)
World Qualification Tournament (Singles)	1	Kang Oejeong (KOR)
Bipartite Commission	1	Leli Marlina (INA)
Total	10	

==== Class 6 ====
Competition	Berths	Qualified
European Para Championships	1	Maryna Lytovchenko (UKR)
African Para Championships	1	Hanna Hammad (EGY)
Asian Para Games	1	Najlah Al-Dayyeni (IRQ)
Parapan American Games	0	—
Oceania Para Championships	0	—
World Ranking Allocation (Singles)	3	Stephanie Grebe (GER); Felicity Pickard (GBR); Katarzyna Marszał (POL)
World Ranking Allocation (Doubles)	3	Jin Yucheng (CHN); Merethe Tveiten (NOR); Morgen Caillaud (FRA)
World Qualification Tournament (Singles)	1	Maliak Alieva (NPA)
Bipartite Commission	1	Camelia Ciripan (ROU)
Total	11	

==== Class 7 ====
Competition	Berths	Qualified
European Para Championships	1	Kübra Öçsoy Korkut (TUR)
African Para Championships	1	Samah Abdelaziz (EGY)
Asian Para Games	1	Wang Rui (CHN)
Parapan American Games	1	Claudia Perez (MEX)
Oceania Para Championships	0	—
World Ranking Allocation (Singles)	2	Kelly van Zon (NED); Kim Seong-ok (KOR)
World Ranking Allocation (Doubles)	3	Bly Twomey (GBR); Nora Korneliussen (NOR); Jenny Slettum (NOR)
World Qualification Tournament (Singles)	1	Victoriya Safanova (NPA)
Bipartite Commission	1	Smilla Sand (SWE)
Total	11	

==== Class 8 ====
Competition	Berths	Qualified
European Para Championships	1	Aida Dahlen (NOR)
African Para Championships	1	Hagar Elsayed (EGY)
Asian Para Games	1	Huang Wenjuan (CHN)
Parapan American Games	1	Florencia Pérez (CHI)
Oceania Para Championships	0	—
World Ranking Allocation (Singles)	2	Thu Kamkasomphou (FRA); Yuri Tomono (JPN)
World Ranking Allocation (Doubles)	3	Juliane Wolf (GER); Zsofia Arloy (HUN); Lucie Hautière (FRA)
World Qualification Tournament (Singles)	1	Elena Litvinenko (NPA)
Bipartite Commission	1	Sophia Kelmer (BRA)
Total	11	

==== Class 9 ====
Competition	Berths	Qualified
European Para Championships	1	Karolina Pęk (POL)
African Para Championships	0	—
Asian Para Games	1	Mao Jingdian (CHN)
Parapan American Games	1	Danielle Rauen (BRA)
Oceania Para Championships	1	Lei Lina (AUS)
World Ranking Allocation (Singles)	4	Alexa Szvitacs (HUN); Liu Meng (CHN); Xiong Guiyan (CHN); Neslihan Kavas (TUR)
World Ranking Allocation (Doubles)	1	Iryna Shynkarova (UKR)
World Qualification Tournament (Singles)	1	Jennyfer Marques Parinos (BRA)
Bipartite Commission	1	Mirjana Lucic (CRO)
Total	11	

==== Class 10 ====
Competition	Berths	Qualified
European Para Championships	1	Natalia Partyka (POL)
African Para Championships	1	Faith Obazuaye (NGR)
Asian Para Games	1	Lin Tzu-yu (TPE)
Parapan American Games	1	Bruna Costa Alexandre (BRA)
Oceania Para Championships	1	Yang Qian (AUS)
World Ranking Allocation (Singles)	2	Merve Demir (TUR); Melissa Tapper (AUS)
World Ranking Allocation (Doubles)	1	Tien Shiau-wen (TPE)
World Qualification Tournament (Singles)	1	Hou Chunxiao (CHN)
Bipartite Commission	1	Anja Händen (SWE)
Total	10	

==== Class 11 ====
Competition	Berths	Qualified
Global Games	1	Ebru Acer (TUR)
African Para Championships	0	—
Asian Para Games	1	Natsuki Wada (JPN)
Parapan American Games	1	Evellyn Pereira dos Santos (BRA)
Oceania Para Championships	0	—
World Ranking Allocation	5	Kanami Furukawa (JPN); Wong Ting Ting (HKG); Léa Ferney (FRA); Natalia Kosmina (UKR); Ng Mui Wui (HKG)
World Qualification Tournament (Singles)	1	Elena Prokofeva (NPA)
Bipartite Commission	1	Denisa Macurova (CZE)
Total	10	

== See also ==
- Table tennis at the 2024 Summer Olympics – Qualification
