= Table tennis at the 2023 Pan American Games – Women's team =

Women's team at the 2023 Pan American Games
- Venue: Olympic Training Center
- Dates: 2–5 November 2023
- Competitors: 36 from 12 nations

Medalists
Gold medal	Amy Wang; Lily Zhang; Rachel Sung	United States
Silver medal	Brianna Burgos; Adriana Díaz; Melanie Díaz	Puerto Rico
Bronze medal	Giulia Takahashi; Bruna Alexandre; Bruna Takahashi	Brazil
Bronze medal	Zhiying Zeng; Paulina Vega; Daniela Ortega	Chile

The women's team competition of the table tennis events at the 2023 Pan American Games was held from 2 to 5 November 2023 at the Olympic Training Center in Santiago, Chile.

== Schedule ==
Date	Time	Round
2–3 November 2023	10:00	Round Robin
3 November 2023	17:00	Quarterfinals
4 November 2023	10:00	Semifinals
5 November 2023	10:00	Final

== Results ==
=== Round Robin ===
The round robin was used as a qualification round. The twelve teams were split into groups of three. The top two teams from each group advanced to the first round of playoffs.

==== Group A ====
Nation	Pld	W	L	GF	GA
Puerto Rico	2	2	0	6	2
Cuba	2	1	1	4	4
Dominican Republic	2	0	2	2	6

November 2; 10:00	Report	Dominican Republic	1–3	Puerto Rico	Table 1

November 2; 17:00	Report	Puerto Rico	3–1	Cuba	Table 2

November 3; 10:00	Report	Cuba	3–1	Dominican Republic	Table 3

==== Group B ====
Nation	Pld	W	L	GF	GA
United States	2	2	0	6	1
Argentina	2	1	1	4	4
Independent Athletes Team	2	0	2	1	6

November 2; 10:00	Report	Independent Athletes Team	0–3	United States	Table 1

November 2; 17:00	Report	Argentina	1–3	United States	Table 2

November 3; 10:00	Report	Argentina	3–1	Independent Athletes Team	Table 3

==== Group C ====
Nation	Pld	W	L	GF	GA
Brazil	2	2	0	6	1
Chile	2	1	1	3	3
Colombia	2	0	2	1	6

November 2; 17:00	Report	Brazil	3–1	Colombia	Table 1

November 2; 10:00	Report	Brazil	3–0	Chile	Table 2

November 3; 10:00	Report	Chile	3–0	Colombia	Table 1

==== Group D ====
Nation	Pld	W	L	GF	GA
Mexico	2	2	0	6	2
Canada	2	1	1	5	4
Venezuela	2	0	2	1	6

November 2; 10:00	Report	Venezuela	1–3	Canada	Table 4

November 2; 17:00	Report	Mexico	3–2	Canada	Table 4

November 3; 10:00	Report	Mexico	3–0	Venezuela	Table 2

=== Playoffs ===
The results were as follows:

Quarterfinals
Argentina	0	1	1
Puerto Rico	3	3	3
Chile	3	1	3	0	3
Mexico	1	3	1	3	0
Brazil	0	3	3	3
Canada	3	1	2	2
United States	3	3	3
Cuba	1	2	1

Semifinals
Puerto Rico	3	3	3
Chile	1	0	1
United States	3	3	3
Brazil	0	0	1

Final
Puerto Rico	0	3	1	2
United States	3	2	3	3

== Final classification ==
Rank	Team	Athlete
1st place, gold medalist(s)	United States	Amy Wang; Lily Zhang; Rachel Sung
2nd place, silver medalist(s)	Puerto Rico	Brianna Burgos; Adriana Díaz; Melanie Díaz
3rd place, bronze medalist(s)	Brazil	Giulia Takahashi; Bruna Alexandre; Bruna Takahashi
3rd place, bronze medalist(s)	Chile	Zhiying Zeng; Paulina Vega; Daniela Ortega
5	Canada	Jessie Xu; Ivy Liao; Mo Zhang
5	Mexico	Clio Barcenas; Arantxa Cossio; Yadira Silva
5	Argentina	Candela Molero; Camila Argüelles; Ana Codina
5	Cuba	Estela Crespo; Daniela Fonseca; Lizdainet Rodríguez
9	Colombia	Cory Téllez; María Perdomo; Juliana Lozada
9	Dominican Republic	Yasiris Ortiz; Eva Brito; Esmerlyn Castro
9	Independent Athletes Team	Mabelyn Enriquez; Lucía Cordero; Hidallyn Zapata
9	Venezuela	Camila Obando; Cristina Gomez; Roxy Gonzalez
