= Table tennis at the 2023 Pan American Games – Qualification =

The following is the qualification system and list of qualified nations for the table tennis at the 2023 Pan American Games competition.

== Qualification system ==
A total of 86 athletes qualified to compete (43 men and 43 women). Each nation may enter a maximum of 6 athletes (three per gender). In each gender there will be a total of 12 teams qualified, with one team per event reserved for the host nation Chile. Six places will be allocated for singles events (by gender) to athletes that have obtained the best results at the qualification tournament for singles events of the Pan American Games. Athletes qualified through various qualifying events.

The top two teams (for men and women) at the 2022 Pan American Championships, the top two teams (not already qualified) from the Caribbean, Central America, South America and the top team from North America, and the two best teams from the Special qualification event will each qualify a team. As stated earlier, Chile also qualified a team in each event. The last 6 spots will be awarded to individuals, with a maximum of two per nation.

== Qualification timeline ==
Event	Date	Venue
2021 Junior Pan American Games	November 30 – December 5	(Colombia) Cali
2022 South American Games	October 9–14	(Paraguay) Asunción
Pan American Championships	October 31 – November 6	(Chile) Santiago
2023 Caribbean Championship	March 20–25	(Guyana) Georgetown
2023 Central American Championship	April 17–22	(Mexico) Cancun
2023 Pan American Games selection tournament (North America)	June 2–4	(Canada) Toronto
2023 South American Championship	June 5–11	(Peru) Lima
Special Qualification Event - Teams	June 15–18	(Peru) Lima
Special Qualification Event - Singles	June 15–18	(Peru) Lima

== Qualification summary ==
A total of 19 countries qualified athletes.

NOC	Men		Women		Total
NOC	Individual	Team	Individual	Team	Total
Argentina	2	X	2	X	6
Barbados	1				1
Brazil	2	X	2	X	6
Canada	2	X	2	X	6
Chile	2	X	2	X	6
Colombia	2		2	X	5
Cuba	2	X	2	X	6
Dominican Republic	1		2	X	4
Ecuador	2	X	2		5
El Salvador	1				1
Guatemala	2	X	2	X	6
Guyana	1		1		2
Mexico	2	X	2	X	6
Paraguay	2	X	1		4
Peru	2	X	1		4
Puerto Rico	2	X	2	X	6
Trinidad and Tobago			1		1
United States	2	X	2	X	6
Venezuela	1		2	X	4
Total: 19 NOCs	43	12	43	12	86

- Each country with a team enters three athletes per respective gender, but is only allowed a maximum two in the individual event.

== Men ==
Competition/Ranking	Athletes per NOC	Total	Qualified
Host Nation	3	3	Chile
2021 Junior Pan American Games	0	0	—
2022 South American Games	3	3	Argentina
Pan American Championships	3	6	Brazil; United States
Caribbean Championship	3	6	Cuba; Puerto Rico
Central American Championship	3	6	Mexico; Guatemala
North America	3	3	Canada
South American Championship	3	3	Paraguay
Special Qualification Event - Teams	3	6	Ecuador; Peru
Special Qualification Event - Singles	1	6	Wu Jiaji (DOM); Cesar Castillo Arocha (VEN); Tyrese Knight (BAR); Shemar Britton (GUY); Santiago Montes (COL); Julián Ramos (COL)
Universality	1	1	~~De Andre Calderon (LCA)~~; Diego Orantes (ESA)
TOTAL		43	

== Women ==
Competition/Ranking	Athletes per NOC	Total	Qualified
Host Nation	3	3	Chile
2021 Junior Pan American Games	0	0	—
2022 South American Games	3	3	Argentina
Pan American Championships	3	6	Brazil; United States
Caribbean Championship	3	6	Cuba; Puerto Rico
Central American Championship	3	6	Mexico; Guatemala
North America	3	3	Canada
South American Championship	3	3	Venezuela
Special Qualification Event - Teams	3	6	Colombia; Dominican Republic
Special Qualification Event - Singles	1	6	Rheann Chung (TTO); Angelica Arellano (ECU); Nathaly Paredes (ECU); Lucero Ovelar (PAR); Isabel Duffoo (PER); Gabriela Suárez (ESA)
Universality	1	1	Chelsea Edghill (GUY)
TOTAL		43	
