= Sümeyra =

Sümeyra is a feminine given name. It may refer to:

- Sümeyra Kaya, Turkish boxer
- Sümeyra Koç (born 1987), Turkish actress
- Sümeyra Türk (born 1997), Turkish para table tennis player
