= 2024 World Team Table Tennis Championships – Women's team =

Women's team at the 2024 World Team Table Tennis Championships
- Venue: Busan Exhibition and Convention Center
- Location: Busan, South Korea
- Dates: 16–24 February
- Teams: 40

Medalists
gold medal	Sun Yingsha; Wang Yidi; Chen Meng; Wang Manyu; Chen Xingtong	China
silver medal	Hina Hayata; Mima Ito; Miwa Harimoto; Miu Hirano; Miyuu Kihara	Japan
bronze medal	Jia Nan Yuan; Prithika Pavade; Camille Lutz; Audrey Zarif; Charlotte Lutz	France
bronze medal	Zhu Chengzhu; Doo Hoi Kem; Lam Yee Lok; Ng Wing Lam; Lee Ho Ching	Hong Kong

The women's team tournament of the 2024 World Team Table Tennis Championships was held from 16 to 24 February 2024.

China won the title for the 23rd time with a win over Japan.

== Format ==
The 40 teams were drawn into eight groups of five teams. After a round robin in each group, the top team advanced to the round of 16, while the second and third-placed teams played in the round of 24, in the knockout stage. A team match consisted of five singles matches, where each singles match was decided in best-of-5 games.

== Qualification ==
Number of teams eligible to compete for the trophy in each team event is 40. Continental Stage – 33 Teams will qualify from the Continental Stage. The Continental quota allocation is the following: 4 for Africa, 10 for Asia, 11 for Europe, 6 for PanAm, and 2 for Oceania. Numbers are according to the "2020 BoD Proposition 28". Host nation - is guaranteed. If the host nation is already qualified through the Continental Stage, the host quota will be reallocated to the ITTF WTR Oct 2023 Intercontinental Stage – As per the decision of the ITTF Council, in Bangkok on August 23, 2023, no Intercontinental Stage will be held in 2023. Instead, the remaining six (6) places shall be allocated as follows; Five (5) places are transferred to the five continents as follows: Africa 1, Asia 1, Europe 1, PanAm 1 and Oceania 1) with the final allocation as per qualifying event or Team World Ranking (TWR) to be confirmed by each Continental Federation. The remaining one (1) place will go to the highest ranked not-yet qualified team on the ITTF WTR November 2023.

Qualification	Teams
Host	South Korea
Africa (5); 2023 African Championships (4) and world team ranking (1)	Egypt; Nigeria; Algeria; South Africa
Americas (7); 2023 Pan American Championships (4) and world team ranking (3)	United States; Brazil; Chile; Puerto Rico; Canada; Mexico; Cuba
Asia (11); 2023 Asian Championships (10) and world team ranking (1)	China; Hong Kong; Japan; Thailand; India; Singapore; Kazakhstan; Iran; Uzbekistan; Chinese Taipei; Malaysia
Europe (12); 2023 European Championships (8) and world team ranking (4)	Germany; Romania; France; Portugal; Italy; Spain; Sweden; Slovakia; Hungary; Luxembourg; Poland; Austria; Serbia; Czech Republic; Ukraine; Croatia
Oceania (3); 2023 Oceanian Championships (2) and world team ranking (1)	Australia
Intercontinental quota (1) world team ranking	

== Draw ==
The draw took place on 16 January 2024.

== Schedule ==
The schedule is as follows.

Fri 16	Sat 17	Sun 18	Mon 19	Tue 20	Wed 21		Thu 22	Fri 23	Sat 24
Group					1/16 F	1/8 F	QF	SF	F

== Group stage ==
All times are local (UTC+9).

=== Group 1 ===
Pos	Team	Pld	W	L	MF	MA	MR	Pts	Qualification
1	China	4	4	0	12	2	6.000	8	Round of 16
2	India	4	3	1	11	7	1.571	7	Playoffs
3	Hungary	4	2	2	8	8	1.000	6	Playoffs
4	Spain	4	1	3	7	10	0.700	5	
5	Uzbekistan	4	0	4	1	12	0.083	4	

Source: World Table Tennis
Rules for classification: 1) points; 2) head-to-head points; 3) head-to-head match ratio.

16 February 2024; 10:00	China	3–2	India

	Individual matches
Sun Yingsha	1–3	Ayhika Mukherjee	10–12, 11–2, 11–13, 6–11
Wang Manyu	3–1	Manika Batra	11–3, 11–8, 13–15, 11–7
Wang Yidi	0–3	Sreeja Akula	7–11, 9–11, 11–13
Sun Yingsha	3–1	Manika Batra	11–3, 11–6, 11–13, 11–9
Wang Manyu	3–0	Ayhika Mukherjee	11–9, 13–11, 11–6

16 February 2024; 10:00	Uzbekistan	1–3	Spain

	Individual matches
Markhabo Magdieva	1–3	Sofia-Xuan Zhang	8–11, 12–14, 12–10, 4–11
Rozalina Khadjieva	1–3	María Xiao	4–11, 11–8, 5–11, 3–11
Rimma Gufranova	3–1	Maria Berzosa	8–11, 12–10, 11–7, 11–7
Markhabo Magdieva	1–3	María Xiao	12–10, 6–11, 2–11, 4–11

17 February 2024; 13:00	Uzbekistan	0–3	China

	Individual matches
Markhabo Magdieva	0–3	Wang Manyu	5–11, 6–11, 0–11
Rimma Gufranova	0–3	Chen Meng	6–11, 1–11, 4–11
Rozalina Khadjieva	0–3	Chen Xingtong	6–11, 2–11, 5–11

17 February 2024; 17:00	Spain	2–3	Hungary

	Individual matches
María Xiao	3–0	Dóra Madarász	11–7, 11–3, 11–7
Sofia-Xuan Zhang	1–3	Georgina Póta	3–11, 11–9, 5–11, 9–11
Maria Berzosa	0–3	Bernadett Bálint	7–11, 3–11, 14–16
María Xiao	3–0	Georgina Póta	11–6, 11–6, 11–6
Sofia-Xuan Zhang	2–3	Dóra Madarász	11–9, 11–6, 8–11, 7–11, 7–11

18 February 2024; 17:00	Hungary	2–3	India

	Individual matches
Dóra Madarász	2–3	Manika Batra	11–8, 5–11, 10–12, 11–8, 4–11
Georgina Póta	3–2	Sreeja Akula	11–3, 11–7, 9–11, 9–11, 11–8
Bernadett Bálint	1–3	Ayhika Mukherjee	11–7, 6–11, 7–11, 8–11
Dóra Madarász	3–1	Sreeja Akula	11–4, 11–6, 5–11, 11–7
Georgina Póta	0–3	Manika Batra	5–11, 12–14, 11–13

18 February 2024; 20:00	Spain	0–3	China

	Individual matches
María Xiao	0–3	Sun Yingsha	3–11, 5–11, 4–11
Sofia-Xuan Zhang	1–3	Chen Meng	11–8, 4–11, 3–11, 5–11
Elvira Rad	0–3	Chen Xingtong	7–11, 6–11, 4–11

19 February 2024; 13:00	China	3–0	Hungary

	Individual matches
Chen Meng	3–0	Dóra Madarász	11–5, 11–3, 11–3
Sun Yingsha	3–0	Mercedes Nagyvaradi	11–2, 11–5, 11–2
Wang Yidi	3–0	Bernadett Bálint	11–8, 11–5, 11–6

19 February 2024; 13:00	India	3–0	Uzbekistan

	Individual matches
Archana Girish Kamath	3–0	Rimma Gufranova	11–7, 11–3, 11–6
Manika Batra	3–0	Markhabo Magdieva	11–7, 11–4, 11–1
Diya Parag Chitale	3–1	Rozalina Khadjieva	11–6, 10–12, 11–4, 11–6

20 February 2024; 17:00	Spain	2–3	India

	Individual matches
María Xiao	3–1	Sreeja Akula	11–9, 9–11, 13–11, 11–4
Sofia-Xuan Zhang	3–2	Manika Batra	6–11, 8–11, 11–9, 11–7
Elvira Rad	2–3	Ayhika Mukherjee	8–11, 13–11, 8–11, 11–9, 4–11
María Xiao	0–3	Manika Batra	9–11, 2–11, 4–11,
Sofia-Xuan Zhang	1–3	Sreeja Akula	6–11, 13–11, 6–11, 3–11,

20 February 2024; 17:00	Hungary	3–0	Uzbekistan

	Individual matches
Dóra Madarász	3–1	Rozalina Khadjieva	6–11, 11–8, 11–6, 13–11
Georgina Póta	3–0	Markhabo Magdieva	11–8, 11–9, 11–3
Bernadett Bálint	3–1	Rimma Gufranova	11–9, 11–6, 9–11, 11–9

=== Group 2 ===
Pos	Team	Pld	W	L	MF	MA	MR	Pts	Qualification
1	Japan	4	4	0	12	0	—	8	Round of 16
2	Brazil	4	3	1	9	5	1.800	7	Playoffs
3	Luxembourg	4	2	2	8	7	1.143	6	Playoffs
4	Iran	4	1	3	4	9	0.444	5	
5	South Africa	4	0	4	0	12	0.000	4	

Source: World Table Tennis
Rules for classification: 1) points; 2) head-to-head points; 3) head-to-head match ratio.

16 February 2024; 13:00	South Africa	0–3	Iran

	Individual matches
Musfiquh Kalam	0–3	Neda Shahsavari	5–11, 2–11, 3–11
Danisha Patel	0–3	Mahshid Ashtari	6–11, 8–11, 9–11
Jade Sasman	0–3	Shima Safaei	4–11, 4–11, 2–11

16 February 2024; 20:00	Luxembourg	0–3	Japan

	Individual matches
Sarah De Nutte	0–3	Hina Hayata	5–11, 7–11, 9–11
Ni Xia Lian	0–3	Miwa Harimoto	10–12, 3–11, 8–11
Tessy Gonderinger	0–3	Miu Hirano	2–11, 6–11, 4–11

17 February 2024; 10:00	Brazil	3–0	South Africa

	Individual matches
Bruna Takahashi	3–0	Musfiquh Kalam	11–6, 11–3, 11–6
Giulia Takahashi	3–1	Danisha Patel	11–4, 9–11, 11–4, 11–9
Bruna Alexandre	3–0	Laila Edwards	11–2, 11–7, 11–7

17 February 2024; 20:00	Iran	0–3	Japan

	Individual matches
Neda Shahsavari	0–3	Mima Ito	5–11, 11–13, 4–11
Mahshid Ashtari	2–3	Miu Hirano	11–6, 11–9, 6–11, 11–13, 11–13
Shima Safaei	0–3	Hina Hayata	8–11, 3–11, 4–11

18 February 2024; 10:00	Luxembourg	2–3	Brazil

	Individual matches
Ni Xialian	3–0	Giulia Takahashi	11–7, 11–7, 11–4
Sarah De Nutte	3–2	Bruna Takahashi	9–11, 12–10, 11–9, 7–11, 11–7
Tessy Gonderinger	1–3	Bruna Alexandre	11–8, 7–11, 7–11, 5–11
Ni Xialian	2–3	Bruna Takahashi	10–12, 11–6, 11–3, 7–11, 9–11
Sarah De Nutte	2–3	Giulia Takahashi	14–16, 11–8, 2–11, 11–8, 9–11

18 February 2024; 20:00	Japan	3–0	South Africa

	Individual matches
Miyuu Kihara	3–0	Danisha Patel	11–0, 11–3, 11–6
Miu Hirano	3–0	Jade Sasman	11–0, 11–1, 11–1
Hina Hayata	3–0	Musfiquh Kalam	11–1, 11–2, 11–1

19 February 2024; 10:00	Iran	1–3	Luxembourg

	Individual matches
Shima Safaei	0–3	Sarah De Nutte	5–11, 9–11, 7–11
Mahshid Ashtari	1–3	Ni Xia Lian	11–9, 7–11, 9–11, 9–11
Neda Shahsavari	3–0	Tessy Gonderinger	11–7, 12–10, 11–3
Shima Safaei	0–3	Ni Xia Lian	7–11, 3–11, 8–11

19 February 2024; 20:00	Japan	3–0	Brazil

	Individual matches
Hina Hayata	3–0	Giulia Takahashi	11–5, 11–4, 11–4
Miwa Harimoto	3–0	Bruna Takahashi	12–10, 11–8, 11–3
Miu Hirano	3–0	Bruna Costa Alexandre	11–8, 11–3, 11–5

20 February 2024; 17:00	Brazil	3–0	Iran

	Individual matches
Bruna Takahashi	3–1	Mahshid Ashtari	11–0, 11–9, 7–11, 11–6
Giulia Takahashi	3–1	Neda Shahsavari	11–7, 9–11, 11–4, 11–5
Bruna Costa Alexandre	3–2	Shima Safaei	11–3, 16–14, 8–11, 4–11, 11–8

20 February 2024; 17:00	South Africa	0–3	Luxembourg

	Individual matches
Danisha Patel	0–3	Ni Xia Lian	3–11, 6–11, 3–11
Musfiquh Kalam	0–3	Sarah De Nutte	5–11, 5–11, 2–11
Laila Edwards	0–3	Tessy Gonderinger	1–11, 5–11, 2–11

=== Group 3 ===
Pos	Team	Pld	W	L	MF	MA	MR	Pts	Qualification
1	Germany	4	4	0	12	1	12.000	8	Round of 16
2	Poland	4	3	1	10	3	3.333	7	Playoffs
3	Slovakia	4	2	2	6	7	0.857	6	Playoffs
4	Mexico	4	1	3	4	9	0.444	5	
5	Nigeria	4	0	4	0	12	0.000	4	

Source: World Table Tennis
Rules for classification: 1) points; 2) head-to-head points; 3) head-to-head match ratio.

16 February 2024; 20:00	Germany	3–1	Poland

	Individual matches
Nina Mittelham	3–2	Katarzyna Węgrzyn	7–11, 11–8, 6–11, 11–5, 12–10
Shan Xiaona	1–3	Natalia Bajor	11–8, 7–11, 12–14, 7–11
Sabine Winter	3–0	Zuzanna Wielgos	11–6, 16–14, 11–4
Nina Mittelham	3–2	Natalia Bajor	6–11, 11–8, 11–9, 5–11, 11–8

16 February 2024; 20:00	Mexico	3–0	Nigeria

	Individual matches
Arantxa Cossio	3–0	Ajoke Ojomu	11–4, 11–6, 11–6
Clio Barcenas	3–2	Offiong Edem	8–11, 6–11, 11–3, 11–9, 11–0
Yadira Silva	3–2	Esther Oribamise	9–11, 11–9, 8–11, 12–10, 11–6

17 February 2024; 13:00	Germany	3–0	Mexico

	Individual matches
Nina Mittelham	3–1	Clio Barcenas	5–11, 11–4, 11–3, 11–2
Shan Xiaona	3–0	Arantxa Cossio	11–4, 11–9, 11–2
Annett Kaufmann	3–1	Yadira Silva	11–6, 11–3, 9–11, 11–7

17 February 2024; 13:00	Nigeria	0–3	Slovakia

	Individual matches
Offiong Edem	1–3	Tatiana Kukuľková	11–8, 12–14, 11–13, 3–11
Esther Oribamise	0–3	Barbora Balážová	5–11, 3–11, 6–11
Ajoke Ojomu	0–3	Ema Labošová	5–11, 11–13, 6–11

18 February 2024; 10:00	Slovakia	0–3	Poland

	Individual matches
Tatiana Kukuľková	0–3	Katarzyna Węgrzyn	9–11, 3–11, 8–11
Barbora Balážová	2–3	Natalia Bajor	9–11, 11–8, 11–9, 8–11, 10–12
Ema Labošová	1–3	Anna Węgrzyn	6–11, 11–7, 8–11, 9–11

18 February 2024; 17:00	Nigeria	0–3	Germany

	Individual matches
Offiong Edem	0–3	Sabine Winter	5–11, 5–11, 2–11
Esther Oribamise	0–3	Nina Mittelham	8–11, 5–11, 2–11
Ajoke Ojomu	0–3	Annett Kaufmann	12–14, 5–11, 3–11

19 February 2024; 20:00	Poland	3–0	Mexico

	Individual matches
Katarzyna Węgrzyn	3–1	Arantxa Cossio	11–4, 11–4, 10–12, 11–5
Natalia Bajor	3–0	Yadira Silva	11–8, 11–6, 11–6
Zuzanna Wielgos	3–0	Clio Barcenas	11–8, 11–8, 11–5

19 February 2024; 20:00	Germany	3–0	Slovakia

	Individual matches
Annett Kaufmann	3–1	Ema Labošová	11–8, 11–4, 8–11, 11–7
Nina Mittelham	3–0	Adriana Illasova	11–4, 11–3, 11–5
Shan Xiaona	3–0	Tatiana Kukuľková	11–6, 11–8, 11–9

20 February 2024; 17:00	Slovakia	3–1	Mexico

	Individual matches
Barbora Balážová	2–3	Arantxa Cossio	11–1, 9–11, 4–11 11–5, 6–11
Tatiana Kukuľková	3–1	Yadira Silva	10–12, 11–3 13–11, 11–5
Ema Labošová	3–1	Clio Barcenas	11–8, 11–8, 7–11, 11–5
Barbora Balážová	3–1	Yadira Silva	11–6, 11–5, 9–11, 11–5

20 February 2024; 17:00	Poland	3–0	Nigeria

	Individual matches
Katarzyna Węgrzyn	3–0	Offiong Edem	11–5, 11–8, 13–11
Natalia Bajor	3–0	Esther Oribamise	11–8, 11–7, 11–4
Anna Węgrzyn	3–0	Ajoke Ojomu	11–6, 11–2, 11–8

=== Group 4 ===
Pos	Team	Pld	W	L	MF	MA	MR	Pts	Qualification
1	Chinese Taipei	4	4	0	12	2	6.000	8	Round of 16
2	Thailand	4	3	1	10	3	3.333	7	Playoffs
3	Chile	4	2	2	6	8	0.750	6	Playoffs
4	United States	4	1	3	6	9	0.667	5	
5	Algeria	4	0	4	0	12	0.000	4	

Source: World Table Tennis
Rules for classification: 1) points; 2) head-to-head points; 3) head-to-head match ratio.

16 February 2024; 10:00	Algeria	0–3	Chile

	Individual matches
Amina Kessaci	0–3	Daniela Ortega	4–11, 4–11, 2–11
Lynda Loghraibi	0–3	Paulina Vega	6–11, 7–11, 4–11
Malissa Nasri	0–3	Judith Morales	4–11, 7–11, 3–11

16 February 2024; 17:00	Thailand	1–3	Chinese Taipei

	Individual matches
Orawan Paranang	2–3	Chen Szu-yu	8–11, 11–9, 11–7, 9–11, 9–11
Suthasini Sawettabut	0–3	Cheng I-ching	6–11, 6–11, 5–11
Jinnipa Sawettabut	3–2	Li Yu-jhun	11–4, 11–6, 6–11, 5–11, 11–8
Orawan Paranang	2–3	Cheng I-ching	8–11, 11–7, 3–11, 11–7, 4–11

17 February 2024; 10:00	Chile	3–2	United States

	Individual matches
Daniela Ortega	3–2	Jessica Reyes Lai	11–2, 8–11, 11–5, 10–12, 11–8
Paulina Vega	1–3	Tiffany Ke	8–11, 11–9, 5–11, 5–11
Judith Morales	2–3	Emily Tan	9–11, 11–6, 11–8, 8–11, 12–14
Daniela Ortega	3–0	Tiffany Ke	11–7, 11–6, 11–7
Paulina Vega	3–2	Jessica Reyes Lai	7–11, 11–6, 9–11, 11–7, 11–8

17 February 2024; 17:00	Algeria	0–3	Chinese Taipei

	Individual matches
Lynda Loghraibi	0–3	Cheng Hsien-tzu	3–11, 6–11, 6–11
Malissa Nasri	0–3	Li Yu-jhun	9–11, 4–11, 8–11
Amina Kessaci	0–3	Chen Szu-yu	7–11, 1–11, 2–11

18 February 2024; 10:00	Chile	0–3	Chinese Taipei

	Individual matches
Daniela Ortega	0–3	Chen Szu-yu	12–14, 4–11, 7–11
Paulina Vega	0–3	Cheng I-ching	3–11, 7–11, 12–14
Judith Morales	0–3	Wang Yi-ju	11–13, 6–11, 9–11

18 February 2024; 10:00	United States	0–3	Thailand

	Individual matches
Tiffany Ke	1–3	Orawan Paranang	11–6, 11–13, 10–12, 4–11
Jessica Reyes Lai	0–3	Suthasini Sawettabut	5–11, 2–11, 4–11
Kayla Goodwin	1–3	Jinnipa Sawettabut	5–11, 11–9, 9–11, 3–11

19 February 2024; 10:00	Chinese Taipei	3–1	United States

	Individual matches
Wang Yi-ju	0–3	Tiffany Ke	4–11, 6–11, 8–11
Li Yu-jhun	3–1	Emily Tan	9–11, 11–3, 11–9, 11–4
Cheng I-ching	3–0	Kayla Goodwin	14–12, 11–5, 11–3
Tiffany Ke	3–0	Li Yu-jhun	11–4, 11–8, 11–5

19 February 2024; 13:00	Thailand	3–0	Algeria

	Individual matches
Tamolwan Khetkhuan	3–0	Amina Kessaci	11–2, 11–3, 11–4
Jinnipa Sawettabut	3–0	Malissa Nasri	11–5, 11–4, 11–8
Wanwisa Aueawiriyayothin	3–0	Lynda Loghraibi	11–9, 11–8, 11–6

20 February 2024; 17:00	Chile	0–3	Thailand

	Individual matches
Paulina Vega	0–3	Orawan Paranang	8–11, 6–11, 8–11
Daniela Ortega	0–3	Suthasini Sawettabut	5–11, 3–11, 8–11
Judith Morales	0–3	Jinnipa Sawettabut	8–11, 9–11, 4–11

20 February 2024; 17:00	United States	3–0	Algeria

	Individual matches
Jesseica Reyes Lai	3–0	Lynda Loghraibi	11–6, 11–6, 11–3
Kayla Goodwin	3–0	Malissa Nasri	11–9, 11–9, 11–7
Amber Liu	3–0	Amina Kessaci	11–9, 11–5, 11–4

=== Group 5 ===
Pos	Team	Pld	W	L	MF	MA	MR	Pts	Qualification
1	South Korea (H)	4	4	0	12	1	12.000	8	Round of 16
2	Malaysia	4	2	2	8	8	1.000	6 (Note: Teams were tied on head-to-head points and match ratio. They were ranked on game ratio; Malaysia 21–18; Italy 19–20; Puerto Rico 18–19.)	Playoffs
3	Italy	4	2	2	8	8	1.000	6	Playoffs
4	Puerto Rico	4	2	2	9	9	1.000	6	
5	Cuba	4	0	4	1	12	0.083	4	

Source: World Table Tennis
Rules for classification: 1) points; 2) head-to-head points; 3) head-to-head match ratio.
(H) Hosts
Notes:

16 February 2024; 13:00	Malaysia	3–0	Cuba

	Individual matches
Alice Chang	3–0	Estela Crespo	11–5, 11–5, 11–7
Karen Lyne	3–0	Daniela Fonseca	11–9, 11–9, 13–11
Ho Ying	3–0	Rosalba Aguiar	11–8, 11–6, 11–5

16 February 2024; 17:00	South Korea	3–0	Italy

	Individual matches
Jeon Ji-hee	3–0	Debora Vivarelli	11–4, 11–9, 11–4
Shin Yu-bin	3–0	Nikoleta Stefanova	11–5, 11–7, 11–7
Lee Zi-on	3–1	Gaia Monfardini	11–8, 11–3, 8–11, 11–9

17 February 2024; 10:00	Puerto Rico	2–3	Italy

	Individual matches
Adriana Díaz	3–1	Gaia Monfardini	7–11, 11–6, 11–6, 16–14
Melanie Díaz	0–3	Nikoleta Stefanova	2–11, 6–11, 9–11
Brianna Burgos	1–3	Giorgia Piccolin	11–7, 8–11, 6–11, 8–11
Adriana Díaz	3–0	Nikoleta Stefanova	11–8, 11–5, 11–7
Melanie Díaz	1–3	Gaia Monfardini	14–16, 11–5, 5–11, 5–11

17 February 2024; 17:00	South Korea	3–0	Malaysia

	Individual matches
Shin Yu-bin	3–0	Ho Ying	11–2, 11–9, 11–4
Jeon Ji-hee	3–0	Karen Lyne	11–4, 11–7, 11–3
Lee Zi-on	3–0	Alice Chang	11–7, 11–1, 11–3

18 February 2024; 10:00	Italy	3–0	Cuba

	Individual matches
Giorgia Piccolin	3–1	Estela Crespo	11–8, 11–5, 10–12, 14–12
Nikoleta Stefanova	3–1	Daniela Fonseca	8–11, 11–6, 11–3, 11–6
Gaia Monfardini	3–1	Rosalba Aguiar	11–5, 11–9, 8–11, 11–6

18 February 2024; 13:00	South Korea	3–1	Puerto Rico

	Individual matches
Jeon Ji-hee	3–0	Brianna Burgos	11–5, 11–9, 11–1
Shin Yu-bin	0–3	Adriana Díaz	6–11, 10–12, 8–11
Lee Zi-on	3–1	Melanie Díaz	7–11, 11–5, 11–6, 11–5
Jeon Ji-hee	3–0	Adriana Díaz	12–10, 11–8, 11–6

19 February 2024; 10:00	Malaysia	2–3	Puerto Rico

	Individual matches
Alice Chang	3–0	Brianna Burgos	11–4, 11–3, 11–6
Karen Lyne	0–3	Adriana Díaz	5–11, 7–11, 7–11
Ho Ying	3–1	Melanie Díaz	11–6, 7–11, 11–8, 11–6
Alice Chang	1–3	Adriana Díaz	8–11, 6–11, 11–9, 10–12
Karen Lyne	2–3	Brianna Burgos	12–10, 5–11, 11–9, 13–15, 6–11

19 February 2024; 20:00	South Korea	3–0	Cuba

	Individual matches
Lee Zi-on	3–0	Daniela Fonseca	11–4, 11–4, 11–4
Lee Eun-hye	3–0	Estela Crespo	14–12, 11–3, 11–5
Yoon Hyo-bin	3–0	Rosalba Aguiar	11–3, 11–5, 11–5

20 February 2024; 10:00	Italy	2–3	Malaysia

	Individual matches
Debora Vivarelli	2–3	Alice Chang	11–8, 7–11, 11–7, 5–11, 9–11
Nikoleta Stefanova	3–2	Karen Lyne	11–4, 7–11, 14–12, 8–11, 11–6
Giorgia Piccolin	3–1	Ho Ying	11–8, 8–11, 12–10, 11–8
Nikoleta Stefanova	1–3	Alice Chang	11–8, 8–11, 5–11, 8–11
Debora Vivarelli	0–3	Karen Lyne	9–11, 5–11, 6–11

20 February 2024; 10:00	Puerto Rico	3–1	Cuba

	Individual matches
Brianna Burgos	3–2	Daniela Fonseca	11–8, 13–11, 7–11, 9–11, 11–8
Adriana Díaz	3–0	Estela Crespo	11–6, 11–3, 11–5
Melanie Díaz	2–3	Rosalba Aguiar	11–5, 7–11, 11–9, 7–11, 7–11
Adriana Díaz	3–0	Daniela Fonseca	11–4, 11–2, 11–6

=== Group 6 ===
Pos	Team	Pld	W	L	MF	MA	MR	Pts	Qualification
1	Hong Kong	4	4	0	12	1	12.000	8	Round of 16
2	Portugal	4	3	1	9	5	1.800	7	Playoffs
3	Austria	4	2	2	9	7	1.286	6	Playoffs
4	Kazakhstan	4	1	3	3	11	0.273	5	
5	Australia	4	0	4	3	12	0.250	4	

Source: World Table Tennis
Rules for classification: 1) points; 2) head-to-head points; 3) head-to-head match ratio.

16 February 2024; 13:00	Austria	1–3	Hong Kong

	Individual matches
Sofia Polcanova	3–1	Zhu Chengzhu	9–11, 11–1, 11–6, 11–5
Karoline Mischek	0–3	Doo Hoi Kem	4–11, 7–11, 4–11
Liu Jia	0–3	Lee Ho Ching	5–11, 7–11, 6–11
Sofia Polcanova	2–3	Doo Hoi Kem	11–5, 10–12, 8–11, 11–7, 8–11

16 February 2024; 13:00	Australia	2–3	Kazakhstan

	Individual matches
Jian Fang Lay	3–2	Zauresh Akasheva	11–6, 8–11, 11–9, 7–11, 11–5
Michelle Bromley	0–3	Sarvinoz Mirkadirova	6–11, 6–11, 7–11
Melissa Tapper	1–3	Anastassiya Lavrova	15–13, 7–11, 3–11, 6–11
Jian Fang Lay	3–0	Sarvinoz Mirkadirova	11–7, 11–3, 15–13
Michelle Bromley	2–3	Zauresh Akasheva	4–11, 11–8, 9–11, 11–9, 4–11

17 February 2024; 17:00	Hong Kong	3–0	Australia

	Individual matches
Doo Hoi Kem	3–0	Melissa Tapper	11–3, 11–6, 11–4
Zhu Chengzhu	3–0	Feng Chunyi	11–4, 11–5, 11–8
Lee Ho Ching	3–0	Michelle Bromley	11–5, 11–4, 11–5

17 February 2024; 17:00	Portugal	3–2	Austria

	Individual matches
Shao Jieni	1–3	Liu Jia	6–11, 11–4, 12–14, 8–11
Fu Yu	0–3	Sofia Polcanova	9–11, 6–11, 5–11
Inês Matos	3–0	Anastasia Sterner	11–9, 11–7, 11–9
Shao Jieni	3–1	Sofia Polcanova	12–10, 4–11, 11–7, 11–7
Fu Yu	3–1	Liu Jia	12–10, 11–9, 10–12, 13–11

18 February 2024; 13:00	Portugal	0–3	Hong Kong

	Individual matches
Shao Jieni	2–3	Zhu Chengzhu	5–11, 13–11, 5–11, 13–11, 6–11
Fu Yu	1–3	Doo Hoi Kem	11–9, 6–11, 3–11, 12–14
Matilde Pinto	0–3	Lee Ho Ching	8–11, 8–11, 8–11

18 February 2024; 17:00	Austria	3–0	Kazakhstan

	Individual matches
Sofia Polcanova	3–0	Zauresh Akasheva	11–6, 11–5, 11–4
Liu Jia	3–0	Sarvinoz Mirkadirova	13–11, 11–3, 11–8
Karoline Mischek	3–1	Anastassiya Lavrova	6–11, 11–8, 11–7, 11–8

19 February 2024; 17:00	Hong Kong	3–0	Kazakhstan

	Individual matches
Zhu Chengzhu	3–0	Sarvinoz Mirkadirova	11–5, 11–9, 11–9
Lee Ho Ching	3–0	Angelina Romanovskaya	11–5, 11–0, 11–3
Doo Hoi Kem	3–1	Anel Bakhyt	11–8, 16–14, 8–11, 11–9

19 February 2024; 20:00	Portugal	3–0	Australia

	Individual matches
Fu Yu	3–1	Jian Fang Lay	7–11, 11–6, 11–9, 12–10
Shao Jieni	3–0	Feng Chunyi	11–5, 11–6, 11–5
Inês Matos	3–1	Michelle Bromley	11–4, 9–11, 11–5, 11–8

20 February 2024; 13:00	Portugal	3–0	Kazakhstan

	Individual matches
Shao Jieni	3–1	Sarvinoz Mirkadirova	11–3, 11–3, 6–11, 11–1
Fu Yu	3–0	Zauresh Akasheva	11–5, 13–11, 11–6
Matilde Pinto	3–1	Anastassiya Lavrova	7–11, 11–6, 11–6, 13–11

20 February 2024; 13:00	Austria	3–1	Australia

	Individual matches
Sofia Polcanova	3–0	Feng Chunyi	11–5, 11–3, 11–2
Karoline Mischek	2–3	Jian Fang Lay	11–13, 3–11, 11–8, 11–8, 12–14
Anastasia Sterner	3–1	Melissa Tapper	12–10, 11–9, 7–11, 11–5
Sofia Polcanova	3–1	Jian Fang Lay	9–11, 11–7, 11–5, 11–6

=== Group 7 ===
Pos	Team	Pld	W	L	MF	MA	MR	Pts	Qualification
1	Romania	4	4	0	12	2	6.000	8	Round of 16
2	Sweden	4	3	1	9	7	1.286	7	Playoffs
3	Singapore	4	2	2	9	8	1.125	6	Playoffs
4	Serbia	4	1	3	7	10	0.700	5	
5	Canada	4	0	4	2	12	0.167	4	

Source: World Table Tennis
Rules for classification: 1) points; 2) head-to-head points; 3) head-to-head match ratio.

16 February 2024; 17:00	Romania	3–0	Sweden

	Individual matches
Bernadette Szőcs	3–0	Christina Källberg	11–8, 11–8, 11–7
Elizabeta Samara	3–0	Linda Bergström	11–5, 11–9, 13–11
Adina Diaconu	3–0	Filippa Bergand	13–11, 11–9, 13–11

16 February 2024; 17:00	Serbia	3–1	Canada

	Individual matches
Sabina Šurjan	3–2	Ivy Liao	11–7, 10–12, 11–4, 7–11, 14–12
Izabela Lupulesku	1–3	Zhang Mo	6–11, 11–4, 8–11, 5–11
Andrea Todorovic	3–0	Jessie Xu	11–8, 11–8, 11–4
Sabina Šurjan	3–2	Zhang Mo	11–9, 5–11, 4–11, 11–6, 15–13

17 February 2024; 10:00	Canada	0–3	Romania

	Individual matches
Ivy Liao	1–3	Elizabeta Samara	5–11, 11–13, 11–5, 6–11
Jessie Xu	0–3	Bernadette Szőcs	2–11, 6–11, 3–11
Natalie Chan	0–3	Adina Diaconu	1–11, 2–11, 8–11

17 February 2024; 20:00	Singapore	2–3	Sweden

	Individual matches
Zeng Jian	0–3	Christina Källberg	4–11, 9–11, 7–11
Zhou Jingyi	3–1	Linda Bergström	11–8, 11–5, 18–20, 11–9
Wong Xin Ru	1–3	Filippa Bergand	9–11, 11–13, 11–4, 14–16
Zeng Jian	3–1	Linda Bergström	11–5, 12–14, 11–8, 11–7
Zhou Jingyi	1–3	Christina Källberg	12–14, 11–8, 8–11, 9–11

18 February 2024; 13:00	Romania	3–1	Singapore

	Individual matches
Bernadette Szőcs	3–0	Zhou Jingyi	11–7, 11–6, 11–8
Elizabeta Samara	1–3	Zeng Jian	7–11, 11–9, 11–13, 7–11
Adina Diaconu	3–0	Ser Lin Qian	11–9, 11–5, 11–3
Bernadette Szőcs	3–0	Zeng Jian	11–6, 12–10, 11–9

18 February 2024; 17:00	Serbia	2–3	Sweden

	Individual matches
Sabina Šurjan	1–3	Christina Källberg	5–11, 10–12, 11–7, 5–11
Andrea Todorovic	3–2	Linda Bergström	9–11, 5–11, 11–7, 11–1, 11–9
Izabela Lupulesku	3–0	Filippa Bergand	11–6, 11–9, 11–4
Sabina Šurjan	2–3	Linda Bergström	5–11, 11–8, 11–2, 2–11, 7–11
Andrea Todorovic	2–3	Christina Källberg	8–11, 11–7, 11–7, 8–11, 4–11

19 February 2024; 13:00	Singapore	3–1	Canada

	Individual matches
Zhou Jingyi	2–3	Zhang Mo	3–11, 11–9, 11–7, 8–11, 5–11
Zeng Jian	3–0	Jessie Xu	11–3, 11–2, 11–3
Wong Xin Ru	3–1	Ivy Liao	8–11, 14–12, 11–3, 12–10
Zeng Jian	3–0	Zhang Mo	11–8, 11–9, 11–4

19 February 2024; 17:00	Romania	3–1	Serbia

	Individual matches
Bernadette Szőcs	3–0	Tijana Jokić	11–8, 11–4, 11–7
Andreea Dragoman	3–1	Sabina Šurjan	11–6, 11–6, 5–11, 11–8
Elena Zaharia	1–3	Izabela Lupulesku	11–4, 9–11, 10–12, 4–11
Bernadette Szőcs	3–2	Sabina Surjan	12–10, 8–11, 10–12, 11–6, 11–5

20 February 2024; 10:00	Serbia	1–3	Singapore

	Individual matches
Sabina Šurjan	3–0	Zhou Jingyi	11–8, 11–8, 11–7
Izabela Lupulesku	1–3	Zeng Jian	11–9, 6–11, 9–11, 3–11
Andrea Todorovic	0–3	Wong Xin Ru	8–11, 12–14, 9–11
Sabina Šurjan	1–3	Zeng Jian	5–11, 12–14, 14–12, 4–11

20 February 2024; 10:00	Sweden	3–0	Canada

	Individual matches
Christina Källberg	3–0	Ivy Liaoo	11–8, 11–8, 11–6
Matilda Hansson	3–1	Jessie Xu	7–11, 11–7, 11–9, 11–4
Filippa Bergand	3–1	Katherine Morin	11–9, 11–9, 11–6, 11–9

=== Group 8 ===
Pos	Team	Pld	W	L	MF	MA	MR	Pts	Qualification
1	France	4	3	1	9	5	1.800	7 (Note: Egypt 0–3 France)	Round of 16
2	Egypt	4	3	1	9	5	1.800	7	Playoffs
3	Croatia	4	2	2	8	6	1.333	6	Playoffs
4	Czech Republic	4	1	3	6	10	0.600	5 (Note: Ukraine 1–3 Czech Republic)	
5	Ukraine	4	1	3	5	11	0.455	5	

Source: World Table Tennis
Rules for classification: 1) points; 2) head-to-head points; 3) head-to-head match ratio.
Notes:

16 February 2024; 17:00	Ukraine	3–2	Croatia

	Individual matches
Solomiya Brateyko	3–0	Lea Rakovac	11–8, 13–11, 12–10
Anastasiya Dymytrenko	1–3	Hana Arapović	9–11, 5–11, 11–7, 3–11
Veronika Matiunina	3–0	Mateja Jeger	12–10, 11–9, 12–10
Solomiya Brateyko	1–3	Hana Arapović	11–7, 5–11, 10–12, 5–11
Anastasiya Dymytrenko	3–2	Lea Rakovac	7–11, 6–11, 11–9, 11–9, 11–8

16 February 2024; 20:00	Czech Republic	2–3	France

	Individual matches
Hana Matelová	3–2	Prithika Pavade	7–11, 6–11, 14–12, 11–8, 12–10
Linda Zaderová	0–3	Jia Nan Yuan	5–11, 2–11, 3–11
Zdena Blašková	3–1	Audrey Zarif	11–4, 6–11, 11–7, 11–9
Hana Matelová	0–3	Jia Nan Yuan	5–11, 5–11, 9–11
Linda Zaderová	0–3	Prithika Pavade	4–11, 2–11, 7–11

17 February 2024; 13:00	Egypt	3–1	Czech Republic

	Individual matches
Dina Meshref	3–0	Zdena Blašková	11–8, 15–13, 11–8
Hana Goda	2–3	Hana Matelová	3–11, 10–12, 13–11, 11–7, 8–11
Mariam Alhodaby	3–1	Kateřina Tomanovská	11–4, 11–7, 6–11, 11–9
Dina Meshref	3–1	Hana Matelová	11–8, 11–9, 11–13, 11–8

17 February 2024; 20:00	Ukraine	0–3	France

	Individual matches
Solomiya Brateyko	2–3	Prithika Pavade	12–10, 7–11, 9–11, 11–5, 5–11
Veronika Matiunina	0–3	Jia Nan Yuan	9–11, 8–11, 2–11
Iolanta Yevtodii	0–3	Charlotte Lutz	9–11, 7–11, 3–11

18 February 2024; 20:00	Egypt	0–3	France

	Individual matches
Adina Diaconu	0–3	Prithika Pavade	10–12, 9–11, 11–13
Hana Matelová	1–3	Jia Nan Yuan	6–11, 5–11, 11–8, 5–11
Yousra Abdel Razek	1–3	Charlotte Lutz	5–11, 11–8, 5–11, 6–11

18 February 2024; 20:00	Croatia	3–0	Czech Republic

	Individual matches
Hana Arapović	3–0	Zdena Blašková	16–14, 11–5, 11–6
Lea Rakovac	3–2	Hana Matelová	11–8, 7–11, 12–10, 6–11, 11–9
Mateja Jeger	3–0	Linda Zaderová	12–10, 12–10, 11–5

19 February 2024; 13:00	Ukraine	1–3	Egypt

	Individual matches
Solomiya Brateyko	0–3	Hana Goda	6–11, 11–13, 8–11
Veronika Matiunina	0–3	Dina Meshref	9–11, 6–11, 13–15
Anastasiya Dymytrenko	3–0	Mariam Alhodaby	11–7, 11–9, 11–9
Solomiya Brateyko	0–3	Dina Meshref	3–11, 8–11, 6–11

19 February 2024; 17:00	France	0–3	Croatia

	Individual matches
Prithika Pavade	0–3	Hana Arapović	8–11, 9–11, 3–11
Jia Nan Yuan	1–3	Lea Rakovac	6–11, 7–11, 11–4, 9–11
Charlotte Lutz	1–3	Mateja Jeger	11–3, 7–11, 6–11, 12–14

20 February 2024; 10:00	Egypt	3–0	Croatia

	Individual matches
Hana Goda	3–1	Hana Arapović	11–4, 11–7, 8–11, 11–9
Dina Meshref	3–0	Lea Rakovac	11–4, 13–11, 11–8
Yousra Abdel Razek	3–0	Mateja Jeger	17–15, 14–12, 11–5

20 February 2024; 10:00	Ukraine	1–3	Czech Republic

	Individual matches
Solomiya Brateyko	1–3	Zdena Blašková	6–11, 13–11, 7–11, 7–11
Veronika Matiunina	3–0	Hana Matelová	11–9, 11–9, 14–12
Anastasiya Dymytrenko	0–3	Kateřina Tomanovská	6–11, 11–13, 9–11
Solomiya Brateyko	0–3	Hana Matelová	9–11, 6–11, 8–11

== Knockout stage ==
=== Bracket ===
Round of 32
Austria	2
Thailand	3
Brazil	3
Hungary	1
Luxembourg	0
Portugal	3
Sweden	3
Slovakia	2
Italy	0
India	3
Poland	3
Singapore	0
Chile	0
Egypt	3
Malaysia	1
Croatia	3

Round of 16
China	3
Thailand	0
Brazil	1
South Korea	3
France	3
Portugal	0
Sweden	0
Germany	3
Chinese Taipei	3
India	1
Poland	1
Hong Kong	3
Romania	3
Egypt	0
Croatia	0
Japan	3

Quarter-finals
China	3
South Korea	0
France	3
Germany	2
Chinese Taipei	2
Hong Kong	3
Romania	0
Japan	3

Semi-finals
China	3
France	0
Hong Kong	0
Japan	3

Final
China	3
Japan	2

=== Playoffs ===
21 February 2024; 10:00	Italy	0–3	India

	Individual matches
Nikoleta Stefanova	0–3	Sreeja Akula	10–12, 6–11, 5–11
Giorgia Piccolin	0–3	Manika Batra	10–12, 6–11, 8–11
Gaia Monfardini	1–3	Ayhika Mukherjee	13–15, 9–11, 15–13, 8–11

21 February 2024; 10:00	Brazil	3–1	Hungary

	Individual matches
Bruna Takahashi	3–1	Dóra Madarász	3–11, 11–7, 11–7, 12–10
Giulia Takahashi	1–3	Georgina Póta	11–9, 1–11, 8–11, 5–11
Bruna Alexandre	3–0	Bernadett Bálint	11–9, 11–8, 14–12
Bruna Takahashi	3–0	Georgina Póta	11–9, 11–6, 11–9

21 February 2024; 10:00	Austria	2–3	Thailand

	Individual matches
Sofia Polcanova	3–0	Orawan Paranang	11–3, 12–10, 11–8
Liu Jia	1–3	Suthasini Sawettabut	8–11, 11–4, 8–11, 9–11
Karoline Mischek	2–3	Jinnipa Sawettabut	8–11, 11–8, 11–9, 8–11, 3–11
Sofia Polcanova	3–0	Suthasini Sawettabut	11–5, 11–7, 11–6
Liu Jia	0–3	Orawan Paranang	9–11, 7–11, 6–11

21 February 2024; 10:00	Luxembourg	0–3	Portugal

	Individual matches
Ni Xia Lian	3–2	Shao Jieni	9–11, 15–13, 5–11, 11–9, 12–10
Sarah De Nutte	3–0	Fu Yu	11–8, 12–10, 11–8
Tessy Gonderinger	3–0	Inês Matos	11–6, 11–9, 11–6

21 February 2024; 10:00	Sweden	3–2	Slovakia

	Individual matches
Linda Bergström	3–0	Tatiana Kukuľková	11–7, 11–3, 11–3
Christina Källberg	1–3	Barbora Balážová	9–11, 4–11, 11–5, 9–11
Filippa Bergand	3–2	Ema Labošová	12–10, 9–11, 9–11, 11–6, 11–5
Linda Bergström	2–3	Barbora Balážová	11–8, 8–11, 9–11, 11–9, 5–11
Christina Källberg	3–1	Tatiana Kukuľková	11–7, 11–8, 9–11, 11–7

21 February 2024; 10:00	Poland	3–0	Singapore

	Individual matches
Natalia Bajor	3–2	Zhou Jingyi	9–11, 11–6, 11–9, 9–11, 11–6
Katarzyna Węgrzyn	3–2	Zeng Jian	11–4, 4–11, 11–9, 7–11, 11–8
Zuzanna Wielgos	3–2	Wong Xin Ru	6–11, 8–11, 11–7, 11–5, 14–12

21 February 2024; 10:00	Chile	0–3	Egypt

	Individual matches
Judith Morales	0–3	Hana Goda	6–11, 12–14, 6–11
Daniela Ortega	1–3	Dina Meshref	11–9, 7–11, 9–11, 9–11
Paulina Vega	0–3	Yousra Abdel Razek	7–11, 8–11, 9–11

21 February 2024; 10:00	Malaysia	1–3	Croatia

	Individual matches
Karen Lyne	2–3	Hana Arapović	11–6, 5–11, 11–8, 9–11, 8–11
Alice Chang	0–3	Lea Rakovac	13–11, 8–11, 10–12
Ho Ying	3–0	Mateja Jeger	13–11, 11–6, 11–6
Alice Chang	1–3	Hana Arapović	10–12, 11–9, 4–11, 3–11

=== Round of 16 ===
21 February 2024; 17:00	Thailand	0–3	China

	Individual matches
Suthasini Sawettabut	0–3	Chen Meng	3–11, 5–11, 0–11
Jinnipa Sawettabut	0–3	Sun Yingsha	8–11, 6–11, 5–11
Orawan Paranang	0–3	Wang Yidi	9–11, 7–11, 5–11

21 February 2024; 17:00	Brazil	1–3	South Korea

	Individual matches
Bruna Takahashi	3–2	Shin Yu-bin	7–11, 11–7, 11–9, 6–11, 11–8
Giulia Takahashi	0–3	Jeon Ji-hee	9–11, 7–11, 2–11
Bruna Alexandre	0–3	Lee Zi-on	5–11, 8–11, 4–11
Bruna Takahashi	0–3	Jeon Ji-hee	7–11, 1–11, 3–11

21 February 2024; 17:00	France	3–0	Portugal

	Individual matches
Jia Nan Yuan	3–2	Fu Yu	11–3, 11–7, 7–11, 1–11, 11–9
Prithika Pavade	3–1	Shao Jieni	11–9, 9–11, 11–3, 11–7
Charlotte Lutz	3–0	Matilde Pinto	11–2, 11–7, 11–4

21 February 2024; 17:00	Sweden	0–3	Germany

	Individual matches
Linda Bergström	0–3	Shan Xiaona	4–11, 10–12, 8–11
Christina Källberg	2–3	Nina Mittelham	11–7, 9–11, 5–11, 12–10, 5–11
Filippa Bergand	0–3	Sabine Winter	7–11, 8–11, 8–11

21 February 2024; 17:00	India	1–3	Chinese Taipei

	Individual matches
Manika Batra	3–2	Chen Szu-yu	11–8, 8–11, 4–11, 11–9, 11–9
Sreeja Akula	0–3	Cheng I-ching	6–11, 9–11, 5–11
Ayhika Mukherjee	1–3	Li Yu-jhun	10–12, 13–15, 11–9, 2–11
Manika Batra	1–3	Cheng I-ching	10–12, 11–5, 9–11, 5–11

21 February 2024; 17:00	Hong Kong	3–1	Poland

	Individual matches
Doo Hoi Kem	3–1	Katarzyna Węgrzyn	11–3, 8–11, 11–6, 11–5
Zhu Chengzhu	2–3	Natalia Bajor	5–11, 2–11, 11–6, 11–5, 6–11
Lee Ho Ching	3–0	Zuzanna Wielgos	11–4, 11–9, 11–7
Doo Hoi Kem	3–0	Natalia Bajor	12–10, 11–7, 15–13

21 February 2024; 17:00	Romania	3–0	Egypt

	Individual matches
Bernadette Szőcs	3–1	Hana Goda	11–2, 6–11, 11–8, 11–6
Elizabeta Samara	3–2	Dina Meshref	11–13, 8–11, 11–5, 11–7, 11–9
Adina Diaconu	3–0	Yousra Abdel Razek	11–8, 11–7, 11–5

21 February 2024; 17:00	Japan	3–0	Croatia

	Individual matches
Hina Hayata	3–0	Lea Rakovac	11–4, 11–6, 11–7
Miwa Harimoto	3–0	Hana Arapović	11–7, 11–4, 11–5
Miu Hirano	3–0	Mateja Jeger	11–1, 11–4, 11–1

=== Quarterfinals ===
22 February 2024; 10:00	Hong Kong	3–2	Chinese Taipei

	Individual matches
Doo Hoi Kem	3–0	Chen Szu-yu	13–11, 11–5, 12–10
Zhu Chengzhu	0–3	Cheng I-ching	9–11, 6–11, 10–12
Lee Ho Ching	3–1	Li Yu-jhun	11–6, 6–11, 11–6, 11–8
Doo Hoi Kem	2–3	Cheng I-ching	7–11, 11–9, 11–7, 8–11, 3–11
Zhu Chengzhu	3–1	Chen Szu-yu	11–9, 4–11, 11–8, 16–14

22 February 2024; 17:00	China	3–0	South Korea

	Individual matches
Sun Yingsha	3–0	Lee Zi-on	11–1, 11–5, 11–1
Chen Meng	3–0	Jeon Ji-hee	11–5, 11–7, 11–9
Wang Yidi	3–0	Shin Yu-bin	11–5, 11–3, 12–10

22 February 2024; 17:00	France	3–2	Germany

	Individual matches
Jia Nan Yuan	3–2	Shan Xiaona	11–6, 11–9, 12–14, 7–11, 11–6
Prithika Pavade	2–3	Nina Mittelham	7–11, 11–6, 9–11, 12–10, 7–11
Charlotte Lutz	3–1	Sabine Winter	11–9, 11–8, 9–11, 12–10
Jia Nan Yuan	1–3	Nina Mittelham	8–11, 6–11, 11–4, 7–11
Prithika Pavade	3–0	Shan Xiaona	11–5, 11–9, 11–2

22 February 2024; 20:00	Romania	0–3	Japan

	Individual matches
Bernadette Szőcs	2–3	Mima Ito	11–9, 5–11, 7–11, 11–6, 9–11
Andreea Dragoman	1–3	Hina Hayata	11–8, 4–11, 4–11, 5–11
Elizabeta Samara	0–3	Miu Hirano	7–11, 7–11, 6–11

=== Semifinals ===
23 February 2024; 13:00	China	3–0	France

	Individual matches
Sun Yingsha	3–0	Prithika Pavade	11–5, 11–8, 14–12
Chen Meng	3–1	Jia Nan Yuan	11–6, 10–12, 11–8, 11–4
Wang Yidi	3–0	Charlotte Lutz	11–5, 16–14, 11–2

23 February 2024; 20:00	Hong Kong	0–3	Japan

	Individual matches
Doo Hoi Kem	2–3	Miwa Harimoto	11–7, 11–9, 4–11, 6–11, 5–11
Zhu Chengzhu	0–3	Hina Hayata	12–14, 3–11 7–11
Lee Ho Ching	0–3	Miu Hirano	5–11, 5–11 5–11

=== Final ===
24 February 2024; 20:00	China	3–2	Japan

	Individual matches
Sun Yingsha	3–0	Miwa Harimoto	11–5, 11–8, 11–4
Chen Meng	1–3	Hina Hayata	11–6, 8–11, 9–11, 12–14
Wang Yidi	0–3	Miu Hirano	8–11, 11–13, 10–12
Sun Yingsha	3–0	Hina Hayata	11–2, 11–7, 11–6
Chen Meng	3–1	Miwa Harimoto	4–11, 11–7, 11–8, 11–7
