= Ebru Acer =

Turkish para table tennis player (born 2002)

Personal information
- Born: 27 June 2002 (age 24) Yenimahalle, Ankara, Turkey

Sport
- Sport: Table tennis
- Club: Şafaktepe GSK
Medal record
Women's Para table tennis
Representing Turkey
Paralympic Games
Bronze medal – third place	2024 Paris	Singles C11
World Championships
Gold medal – first place	2025 Cairo	doubles C11
Bronze medal – third place	2022 Granada	doubles C11
European Championships
Gold medal – first place	2023 Sheffield	singles C11
Silver medal – second place	2019 Helsingborg	singles C11
VIRTUS European Summer Games
Gold medal – first place	2022 Krakow	singles C11
Gold medal – first place	2022 Krakow	open
Tournaments
Gold medal – first place	2024 Ostrava	singles C11
Gold medal – first place	2024 Laško	singles C11
Silver medal – second place	2024 Giza	singles C11
Gold medal – first place	2023 Vichy	singles C11
Gold medal – first place	2023 Vichy	doubles C11
Gold medal – first place	2023 Ostrava	singles C11

Ebru Acer (born 27 June 2002) is a Turkish European champion para table tennis player competing in the C11 disability class. Acer is the first ever Turkish para table tennis player to become a Paralympian. She participated at the 2024 Paralympics in Paris, France, and won a bronze medal.

== Sport career ==
Acer started para table tennis playing with her family's encouragement in 2017. She is a member of Şafaktepe GSK in Ankara.

=== 2019 ===
In 2019, she took the silver medal in the singles C11 event at the European Para Table Tennis Championships in Helsingborg, Sweden.

=== 2022 ===
She received the bronze medal with her teammate Sümeyra Türk in the doubles C11 event at the 2022 World Tennis Championships in Granada, Spain. In June, she won gold medal at the 2022 ITTF Czech Para Open in Ostrava. In July 2022, Acer took won two gold medal in the women's singles and women's open events at the VIRTUS European Summer Games held in Kraków, Poland.

=== 2023 ===
In 2023, she took the silver medal at the 2023 ITTF Thailand Open Tennis Tournament in Bangkok. She claimed the gold medal in the singles C11, and another gold medal with her teammate Sümeyra Türk in the doubles C11 event at the 2023 Virtus Global Games in Vichy, France. In the same year, she became champion at the 2023 European Para Table Tennis Championships in Sheffield, England.

=== 2024 ===
In 2024, she took the silver medal at the 2024 ITTF Egypt Para Open in Giza, the gold medal in the singles C11 event at the ITTF Slovenia Para Open Thermana Laško in Laško, Slovenia, and another gold medal in the singles C11 event at the 2024 ITTF Czech Para Open in Ostrava, Czech Republic.

Acer's champion title at the 2023 Global Games brought her the qualification to represent her country at the 2024 Paralympics in Paris, France. She participated at the 2024 Paralympics in Paris, France, and won a bronze medal. Acer is the first ever Turkish para table tennis player to become a Paralympian.

=== 2025 ===
At the 2025 Virtus World Table Tennis Championships in Cairo, Egypt, she and her teammate Sümeyra Türk won the gold medal in the doubles C11 event, as Turkey's first ever gold medal in that event in the world championships.

== Personal life ==
Acer was born in 2002 into a family in poverty living in a slum of Ankara's Yenimahalle district. In her school years, she was not successful. Currently, she is a student of sport coaching at Gazi University in Ankara.
