= Table tennis at the 2023 Pan American Games – Women's doubles =

Women's doubles at the 2023 Pan American Games
- Venue: Olympic Training Center
- Dates: 29 & 31 October 2023
- Competitors: 20 from 10 nations

Medalists
Gold medal	Amy Wang; Rachel Sung	United States
Silver medal	Bruna Takahashi; Giulia Takahashi	Brazil
Bronze medal	Melanie Díaz; Adriana Díaz	Puerto Rico
Bronze medal	Daniela Ortega; Paulina Vega	Chile

The women's doubles competition of the table tennis events at the 2023 Pan American Games was held on 29 and 31 October 2023 at the Olympic Training Center in Santiago, Chile.

== Schedule ==
Date	Time	Round
29 October 2023	10:40	Round of 16
29 October 2023	19:00	Quarterfinals
31 October 2023	13:20	Semifinals
31 October 2023	19:20	Final

== Results ==
The results during the elimination rounds and final rounds were as follows:

Round of 16
Cory Téllez (COL); María Perdomo (COL)	7	9	11	11	4	11	11
Roxy González (VEN); Camila Obando (VEN)	11	11	7	9	11	6	13
Clio Barcenas (MEX); Arantxa Cossio (MEX)	8	10	11	11	11	11
Nathaly Paredes (ECU); Angélica Arellano (ECU)	11	12	6	6	8	6
Bruna Takahashi (BRA); Giulia Takahashi (BRA)	11	11	11	11
Eva Brito (DOM); Esmerlyn Castro (DOM)	8	8	7	6
Jessie Xu (CAN); Ivy Liao (CAN)	10	2	11	5	3
Daniela Fonseca (CUB); Estela Crespo (CUB)	12	11	7	11	11
Lucia Cordero (EAI); Mabelyn Enriquez (EAI)	8	9	9	11	11	11	12
Candela Molero (ARG); Camila Argüelles (ARG)	11	11	11	3	6	9	10

Quarterfinals
Amy Wang (USA); Rachel Sung (USA)	11	11	11	11
Roxy Gonzalez (VEN); Camila Obando (VEN)	8	2	9	4
Clio Barcenas (MEX); Arantxa Cossio (MEX)	6	11	8	6	11	11	5
Daniela Ortega (CHI); Paulina Vega (CHI)	11	6	11	11	9	9	11
Bruna Takahashi (BRA); Giulia Takahashi (BRA)	6	11	11	11	3	11
Daniela Fonseca (CUB); Estela Crespo (CUB)	11	8	6	6	11	6
Lucía Cordero (EAI); Mabelyn Enriquez (EAI)	3	4	7	9
Melanie Díaz (PUR); Adriana Díaz (PUR)	11	11	11	11

Semifinals
Amy Wang (USA); Rachel Sung (USA)	12	5	11	5	11	11
Daniela Ortega (CHI); Paulina Vega (CHI)	10	11	6	11	6	3
Bruna Takahashi (BRA); Giulia Takahashi (BRA)	14	11	12	8	12
Melanie Díaz (PUR); Adriana Díaz (PUR)	12	1	10	11	10

Final
Amy Wang (USA); Rachel Sung (USA)	11	5	7	12	11	4	11
Bruna Takahashi (BRA); Giulia Takahashi (BRA)	7	11	11	10	8	11	6
