= Sümeyra Türk =

Turkish para table tennis player (born 1997)

Personal information
- Born: 1 January 1997 (age 29) Çorum, Turkey

Sport
- Sport: Table tennis
- Club: Sakarya Büyükşehir BSK
Medal record
Women's Para table tennis
Representing Turkey
World Championships
Bronze medal – third place	2022 Granada	doubles
Virtus World Championships
Bronze medal – third place	2025 Cairo	singles
Gold medal – first place	2025 Cairo	doubles
Virtus Global Games
Gold medal – first place	2023 Vichy	doubles
Virtus European Summer Games
Bronze medal – third place	2022 Kraków	singles
Bronze medal – third place	2022 Kraków	open
Silver medal – second place	2022 Kraków	doubles
ITTP-PTT Tournaments
Silver medal – second place	2025 Ostrova	singles
Gold medal – first place	2025 Ostrova	doubles
Gold medal – first place	2023 Warsaw	doubles
Bronze medal – third place	2023 Warsaw	mixed doubles
Gold medal – first place	2023 Vichy	doubles
Silver medal – second place	2018 Almeria	singles
INAS European Youth Games
Silver medal – second place	2018 Paris	singles
Silver medal – second place	2018 Paris	doubles
Bronze medal – third place	2018 Paris	smixed doubles

Sümeyra Türk (born 1 January 1997) is a Turkish para table tennis player competing in the C11 disability class.

== Sport career ==
=== Early years ===
Türk started her table tennis career as a sportswoman with intellectual disabilities in the sports club of her Anatolian Business School in Çorum with the encouragement of her school teacher and the school principal. She competed at the 2015 Turkish Championships in Istanbul, and took the third place. In 2016, she became champion at the national championships in Ankara.

=== 2018 ===
She took the silver medal at the PTT Spanish Open 2018 in Almeria. She won silver medals in the singles and doubles and a bronze medal in the mixed doubles event at the INAS European Youth Games in Paris, France.

=== 2022 ===
Türk received the bronze medal with her teammate Ebru Acer in the doubles C11 event at the 2022 World Para Table Tennis Championships in Granada, Spain. At the 2022 Virtus European Summer Games in Kraków, Poland, she won bronze medals in the singles and open events, and the silver medal in the doubles with Ebru Acer.

=== 2023 ===
She claimed the gold medal with her teammate Ebru Acer in the doubles C11 event at the 2023 Virtus Global Games in Vichy, France. She won the gold medal in the doubles event with her teammate Ebru Acer and a bronze medal in the mixed doubles with Garip Olcaş at the ITTF Polish Para Open 2023 Tournaments in Warsaw that was held within the scope of preparations for the 2024 Paris Paralympic Games.

=== 2025 ===
She won the silver medal in the singles and the gold medal in the doubles event at the ITTF-PTT Future Ostrova table tennis tournament in the Czech Republic. At the 2025 Virtus World Table Tennis Championships in Cairo, Egypt, she won the bronze medal in the singles, and the gold medal with her teammate Ebru Acer in the doubles event.

== Personal life ==
Born on 1 January 1997, Sümeyra Türk is a native of Çorum, Turkey.
