= Rachel Sung =

American table tennis player

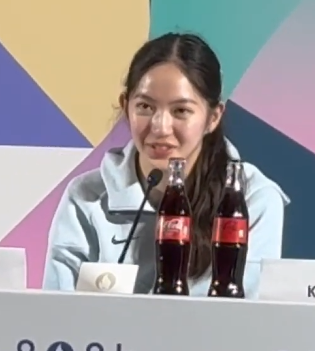
- Sung in 2024

Personal information
- Born: July 9, 2004 (age 22) San Jose, California, U.S.

Sport
- Sport: Table tennis
- Club: Atlanta Blazers (MLTT)
- Playing style: Right-handed, shakehand grip
Medal record
Women's table tennis
Representing the United States
Pan American Games
Gold medal – first place	2023 Santiago	Doubles
Gold medal – first place	2023 Santiago	Team
Pan American Championships
Gold medal – first place	2022 Santiago	Doubles
Silver medal – second place	2022 Santiago	Team
World University Games
Bronze medal – third place	2021 Chengdu	Doubles

Rachel Sung (Chinese: 宋家瑜; born July 9, 2004) is an American table tennis player who competed at the 2024 Summer Olympics.

== Early life and education ==
Sung is the daughter of Michael Sung and Tzuying Li, who met at a table tennis tournament while attending college in Taiwan. Sung began playing table tennis at age seven. She has an older sister, Trinity, and a twin sister, Joanna, who also plays table tennis.

Sung attends the University of California, Los Angeles, majoring in cognitive science with a specialization in computer programming and a minor in film, television, and media. She was roommates with her doubles teammate Amy Wang.

== Career ==
In November 2021, Sung competed at the 2021 World Table Tennis Championships in the doubles event with her sister Joanna. In December 2021, she won silver medals in the doubles and team events at the 2021 ITTF World Youth Championships. She subsequently won a gold medal in doubles and a silver medal in the team event at the 2022 Pan American Table Tennis Championships.

At the 2023 Pan American Games, Sung won gold medals in the doubles and team events.

In March 2024, Sung was named to the U.S. roster for the 2024 Summer Olympics. In the team event, Sung, Amy Wang, and Lily Zhang were defeated by Germany in the first round.

== Major League Table Tennis ==
Sung joined Major League Table Tennis (MLTT) for its inaugural season after being drafted by the Portland Paddlers. She competed for Portland through the 2024 and 2025 seasons.

In December 2025, the Portland Paddlers traded Sung to the Atlanta Blazers in exchange for Minhyung Jee and a 2026 second-round draft pick. The transaction was the first trade in MLTT history involving a female player.
