= Amy Wang =

American table tennis player

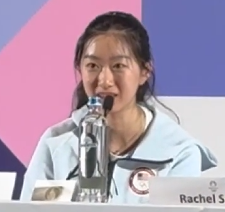
- Amy Wang in 2024

Personal information
- Nationality: United States
- Born: December 2, 2002 (age 23) Sewell, New Jersey, U.S.

Sport
- Sport: Table tennis
- Playing style: Shakehand
- Highest ranking: 29 (1 November 2023)
- Current ranking: 50 (28 September 2026)
Medal record
Women's table tennis
Representing the United States
Pan American Games
Gold medal – first place	2023 Santiago	Doubles
Gold medal – first place	2023 Santiago	Team
Bronze medal – third place	2019 Lima	Team
Pan American Championships
Gold medal – first place	2019 Asunción	Team
Gold medal – first place	2022 Santiago	Doubles
Gold medal – first place	2023 Havana	Singles
Silver medal – second place	2019 Asunción	Mixed doubles
Silver medal – second place	2022 Santiago	Mixed doubles
Silver medal – second place	2022 Santiago	Team
Bronze medal – third place	2021 Lima	Team
Bronze medal – third place	2024 San Salvador	Singles
Bronze medal – third place	2024 San Salvador	Mixed doubles
Bronze medal – third place	2024 San Salvador	Team
Pan American Cup
Gold medal – first place	2026 San Francisco	Singles
Silver medal – second place	2024 Corpus Christ	Singles
Bronze medal – third place	2025 San Francisco	Singles
World University Games
Bronze medal – third place	2021 Chengdu	Doubles

Amy Wang (born December 2, 2002) is an American table tennis player who competed at the 2024 Summer Olympics.

== Early life and education ==
Wang started playing table tennis at age four, and is coached by her father, Xiaota. Her two older brothers, Allen and Eddie, are both table tennis players. Raised in Sewell, New Jersey, Wang attended Washington Township High School.

Wang attended the University of California, Los Angeles (UCLA) where she majored in neuroscience with a minor in accounting. She graduated from UCLA with a bachelor's degree in neuroscience in June 2026.

== Career ==
Wang made her international debut for the United States at the 2018 Summer Youth Olympics. She made her first U.S. national team at 12 years old.

In August 2019, she competed at the 2019 Pan American Games and won a bronze medal in the team event. In September 2019 she competed at the 2019 Pan American Table Tennis Championships and won a gold medal in the team event and a silver medal in the mixed doubles event with Nikhil Kumar. During qualification for the 2020 Summer Olympics, Wang was one game away from qualifying for the team.

In November 2021, she competed at the 2021 Pan American Table Tennis Championships and won a bronze medal in the team event. In December 2021 she competed at the 2021 ITTF World Youth Championships and won silver medals in the doubles and team events. She then competed at the 2022 Pan American Table Tennis Championships and won a gold medal in the doubles event, and silver medals in the mixed doubles and team events.

In September 2023, she competed at the 2023 Pan American Table Tennis Championships and won a gold medal in the singles event. In November 2023 she competed at the 2023 Pan American Games and won gold medals in the doubles and team events.

In March 2024, Wang was named to team USA's roster to compete at the 2024 Summer Olympics. During the singles event, Wang lost to Adriana Díaz in the round of 32. She won the first two games before losing the final four games in a row. During the team event, Wang, Rachel Sung and Lily Zhang lost to Germany in the first round.

== Major League Table Tennis ==
In 2023, Wang joined the Texas Smash for the inaugural season of Major League Table Tennis (MLTT). During the 2023–24 season, she helped lead the Smash to the league's first championship, defeating the Princeton Revolution in the finals to claim the MLTT Cup.

Wang continued with the Texas Smash for the 2024–25 and 2025–26 seasons. In the 2024–25 season, she was named an MLTT MVP Finalist, leading her team to a first-place finish in the Western Division during the regular season.
