= Table tennis at the 2022 South American Games =

Table tennis competitions at the 2022 South American Games

- Venue: Federación Paraguaya de Tenis de Mesa
- Dates: October 9−14
- Nations: 12

Table tennis competitions at the 2022 South American Games in Asunción, Paraguay were held between October 9 and 14, 2022 at the Federación Paraguaya de Tenis de Mesa.

== Schedule ==
The competition schedule is as follows:

P	Preliminary round	F	Final

Date Event	Sun 9	Mon 10		Tue 11		Wed 12	Thu 13	Fri 14
Men's singles	P	P		P	F			
Men's doubles	P	P		P	F			
Men's team						P	P	F
Women's singles	P	P		P	F			
Women's doubles	P	P		P	F			
Women's team						P	P	F
Mixed doubles	P	P	F					

== Medal summary ==
=== Medal table ===
* Host nation (Paraguay)

Rank	Nation	Gold	Silver	Bronze	Total
1	Argentina	3	5	1	9
2	Chile	3	1	3	7
3	Brazil	1	1	3	5
4	Ecuador	0	0	3	3
5	Venezuela	0	0	2	2
6	Colombia	0	0	1	1
6	Paraguay*	0	0	1	1
Totals (7 entries)		7	7	14	28

=== Medalists ===
==== Men ====
Event	Gold	Silver	Bronze
Singles	Santiago Lorenzo; Argentina	Horacio Cifuentes; Argentina	Nicolás Burgos; Chile
Singles	Santiago Lorenzo; Argentina	Horacio Cifuentes; Argentina	Gastón Alto; Argentina
Doubles	Gastón Alto; Horacio Cifuentes; Argentina	Gustavo Gómez; Nicolás Burgos; Chile	Darío Toranzos; Marcelo Aguirre; Paraguay
Doubles	Gastón Alto; Horacio Cifuentes; Argentina	Gustavo Gómez; Nicolás Burgos; Chile	Emiliano Riofrio; Jorge Miño; Ecuador
Team	Gastón Alto; Horacio Cifuentes; Santiago Lorenzo; Argentina	Carlos Ishida; Guilherme Teodoro; Rafael Turrini; Brazil	Alfonso Olave; Gustavo Gómez; Nicolás Burgos; Chile
Team	Gastón Alto; Horacio Cifuentes; Santiago Lorenzo; Argentina	Carlos Ishida; Guilherme Teodoro; Rafael Turrini; Brazil	Emiliano Riofrio; Jorge Miño; Neycer Robalino; Ecuador

==== Women ====
Event	Gold	Silver	Bronze
Singles	Luca Kumahara; Brazil	Camila Argüelles; Argentina	Daniela Ortega; Chile
Singles	Luca Kumahara; Brazil	Camila Argüelles; Argentina	Cory Téllez; Colombia
Doubles	Daniela Ortega; María Paulina Vega; Chile	Camila Argüelles; Candela Molero; Argentina	Beatriz Kanashiro; Luca Kumahara; Brazil
Doubles	Daniela Ortega; María Paulina Vega; Chile	Camila Argüelles; Candela Molero; Argentina	Camila Obando; Roxy González; Venezuela
Team	Daniela Ortega; Judith Morales; María Paulina Vega; Chile	Camila Kaizoji; Camila Argüelles; Candela Molero; Argentina	Beatriz Kanashiro; Luca Kumahara; Victória Strassburger; Brazil
Team	Daniela Ortega; Judith Morales; María Paulina Vega; Chile	Camila Kaizoji; Camila Argüelles; Candela Molero; Argentina	Camila Obando; Mariangel Díaz; Roxy González; Venezuela

==== Mixed ====
Event	Gold	Silver	Bronze
Doubles	Daniela Ortega; Gustavo Gómez; Chile	Camila Argüelles; Horacio Cifuentes; Argentina	Luca Kumahara; Guilherme Teodoro; Brazil
Doubles	Daniela Ortega; Gustavo Gómez; Chile	Camila Argüelles; Horacio Cifuentes; Argentina	Jorge Miño; Nathaly Paredes; Ecuador

== Participation ==
Twelve nations participated in table tennis events of the 2022 South American Games.

- Argentina
- Bolivia
- Brazil
- Chile
- Colombia
- Curaçao
- Ecuador
- Guyana
- Panama
- Paraguay
- Peru
- Venezuela
