= Zhiying Zeng =

Chilean table tennis player (born 1966)

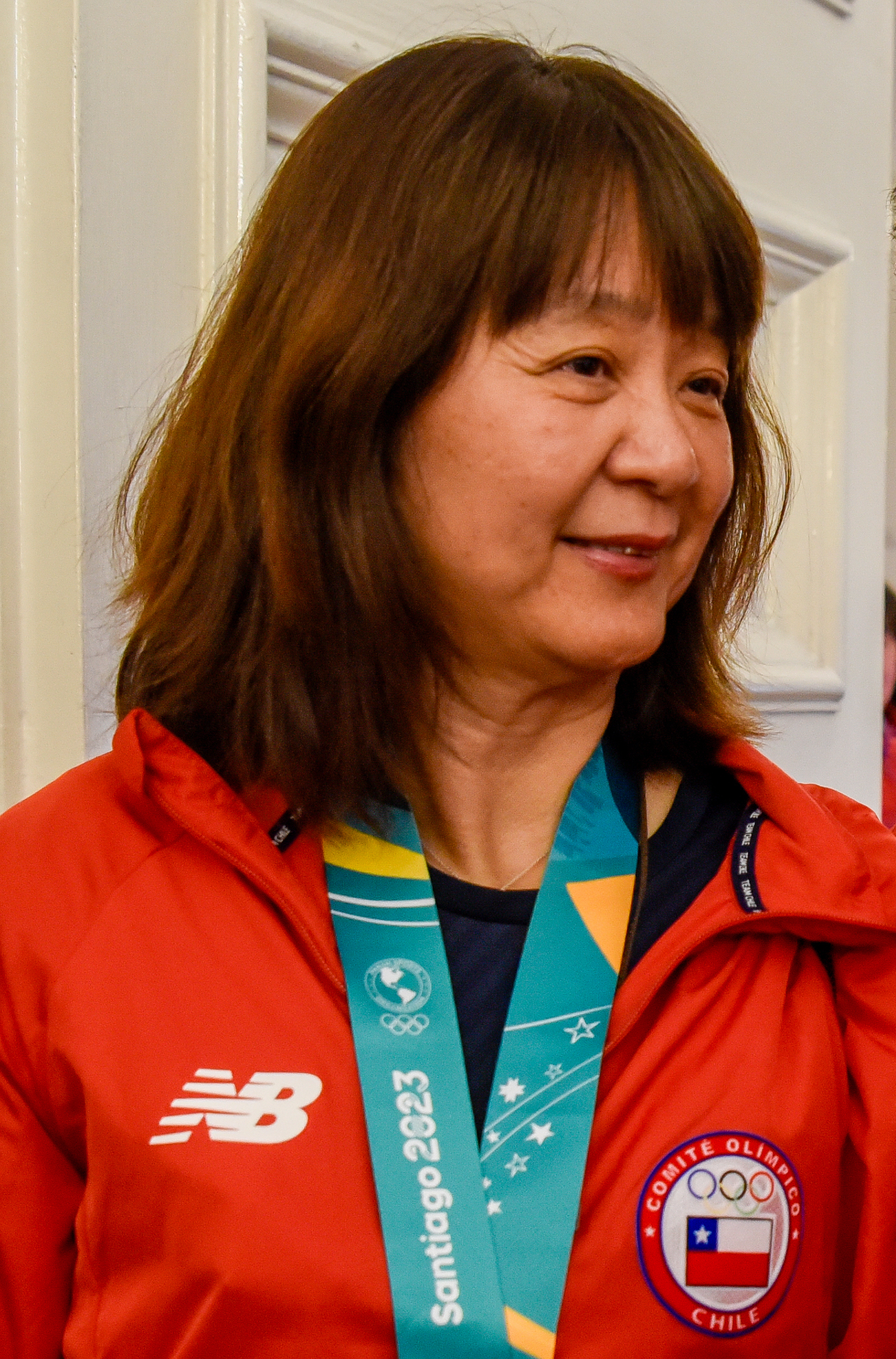
- Zeng in 2023

Personal information
- Native name: 曾志英
- Nationality: Chinese (former), Chilean (current)
- Born: 17 July 1966 (age 59) Guangzhou, China

Sport
- Country: Chile
- Sport: Table tennis
Medal record
Representing Chile
Table tennis
Pan American Championship
| Bronze medal – third place | 2025 Rock Hill | Team |
Pan American Games
| Bronze medal – third place | 2023 Santiago | Team |

Zhiying "Tania" Zeng (born 17 July 1966; Cantonese Yale: dzāng jī wihng) is a Chinese-Chilean table tennis player. Born in China, she represents Chile internationally. She was part of the Chinese team prior to moving to Chile. She had a long break and returned to table tennis as a competitor during the COVID-19 pandemic. She competed in the women's singles event at the 2024 Summer Olympics and represented Chile in the sport, but lost in the preliminary round and did not advance.

== Biography ==
Zeng was born in Guangzhou. Her mother was a table tennis coach and Zeng was raised near a sports complex with access to professional players. She was trained by her mother until the age of nine, and then joined an elite sports academy at age 11. She is friends with her former Chinese team teammate Ni Xialian, a Shanghai-born Luxembourgish table tennis player, whom she reconnected with at the 2024 Summer Olympics.

By the time she became a professional player at the age of twelve, she had already won a national junior championship. Zeng first made the Chinese table tennis team at the age of sixteen. According to Zeng, a 1986 rule change requiring the two sides of the table tennis racket to be different colors hurt her play, since she liked to confuse her opponents by frequently swapping sides during play. Zeng's playing style was now more predictable and she fell out of the Chinese national team's ranks.

In 1989, Zeng took up an invitation to go to Chile and become a table tennis coach for schoolchildren in Arica. In 2003, Zeng began playing again as part of an effort to encourage her son to take up the sport. She won national-level tournaments in 2004 and 2005, when she stopped once her son was old enough to travel to competitions on his own.

Zeng had a long break and returned to table tennis as a competitor during the COVID-19 pandemic. She first competed in regional tournaments in Iquique, before qualifying for the women's team for the 2023 South American Table Tennis Championships. There, she won the women's team tournament, and won silvers in the women's singles and doubles. Zeng subsequently played at the 2023 Pan American Games, winning a bronze medal in the women's team event alongside Daniela Ortega and Paulina Vega. Her performance, including a four-set comeback in the first round of the singles event, lead to her becoming a media sensation in Chile, with even Chilean president Gabriel Boric sending her congratulations on social media.

She competed in the women's singles event at the 2024 Summer Olympics, but lost in the preliminary round and did not advance.

== Personal life ==
She lives in Iquique, Chile where she owns a furniture business. She is married and has two children. She speaks Spanish fluently.

== Awards ==
In December 2024, Zeng was included on the BBC's 100 Women list.
