= María Paulina Vega =

Chilean table tennis player (born 1984)

Personal information
- Nationality: Chilean
- Born: 13 March 1984 (age 42)

Sport
- Sport: Table tennis
Medal record
Representing Chile
Women's table tennis
Pan American Championship
Bronze medal – third place	2025 Rock Hill	Doubles
Bronze medal – third place	2025 Rock Hill	Team
Pan American Games
Bronze medal – third place	2023 Santiago	Doubles
Bronze medal – third place	2023 Santiago	Team
Bronze medal – third place	2023 Santiago	Mixed doubles
South American Games
Gold medal – first place	2022 Asunción	Doubles
Gold medal – first place	2022 Asunción	Team
Gold medal – first place	2022 Asunción	Mixed doubles
Silver medal – second place	2018 Cochabamba	Doubles
Silver medal – second place	2018 Cochabamba	Team
Bolivarian Games
Gold medal – first place	2022 Valledupar	Team
Silver medal – second place	2022 Valledupar	Singles
Silver medal – second place	2022 Valledupar	Mixed doubles

María Paulina Vega (born 13 March 1984) is a Chilean table tennis player. She competed in the women's doubles event at the 2004 Summer Olympics. In June 2021, she qualified to represent Chile at the 2020 Summer Olympics.

At the 2023 Pan American Games, held in Santiago, Vega won three bronze medals, in the women's doubles with Daniela Ortega, the mixed doubles with Nicolás Burgos, and the women's team with Ortega and Zhiying Zeng.

At the Pan American Table Tennis Championships, Vega has won two bronze medals, in the women's doubles and team, both in 2025.
