= Table tennis at the 2023 Pan American Games =

- Table tennis pictogram
- Venue: Olympic Training Center
- Start date: October 29, 2023
- End date: November 5, 2023
- No. of events: 7 (3 men, 3 women, 1 mixed)
- Competitors: 88 from 19 nations

Table tennis competitions at the 2023 Pan American Games in Santiago, Chile are scheduled to be held between October 29 and November 5, 2023 at the Olympic Training Center located at Ñuñoa.

Seven medal events are scheduled to be contested, two singles events, three doubles events and two team events.

== Qualification system ==
A total of 88 athletes will qualify to compete (44 men and 44 women). Each nation may enter a maximum of 6 athletes (three per gender). In each gender there will be a total of 12 teams qualified, with one team per event reserved for the host nation Chile. Six places will be allocated for singles events (by gender) to athletes that have obtained the best results at the qualification tournament for singles events of the Pan American Games. Athletes qualified through various qualifying events.

The top two teams (for men and women) at the 2022 Pan American Championships, the top two teams (not already qualified) from the Caribbean, Central America, South America and the top team from North America, and the two best teams from the Special qualification event will each qualify a team. As stated earlier, Chile also qualified a team in each event. The last 6 spots will be awarded to individuals, with a maximum of two per nation.

== Participating nations ==
A total of 19 countries qualified athletes.

- Argentina (7)
- Barbados (1)
- Brazil (6)
- Canada (6)
- Chile (6)
- Colombia (5)
- Cuba (7)
- Dominican Republic (4)
- Ecuador (5)
- El Salvador (1)
- Guyana (2)
- Independent Athletes Team (6)
- Mexico (6)
- Paraguay (4)
- Peru (5)
- Puerto Rico (6)
- Trinidad and Tobago (1)
- United States (6)
- Venezuela (4)

== Medal summary ==
=== Medal table ===
* Host nation (Chile)

Rank	NOC's	Gold	Silver	Bronze	Total
1	Brazil	2	4	1	7
2	Cuba	2	1	0	3
3	United States	2	0	2	4
4	Puerto Rico	1	1	1	3
5	Canada	0	1	3	4
6	Chile*	0	0	4	4
7	Argentina	0	0	2	2
8	Mexico	0	0	1	1
Totals (8 entries)		7	7	14	28

=== Medalists ===
Event	Gold	Silver	Bronze
Men's singles	Hugo Calderano; Brazil	Andy Pereira; Cuba	Eugene Wang; Canada
Men's singles	Hugo Calderano; Brazil	Andy Pereira; Cuba	Marcos Madrid; Mexico
Men's doubles	Cuba; Jorge Campos; Andy Pereira	Brazil; Hugo Calderano; Vitor Ishiy	Argentina; Horacio Cifuentes; Gastón Alto
Men's doubles	Cuba; Jorge Campos; Andy Pereira	Brazil; Hugo Calderano; Vitor Ishiy	Chile; Gustavo Gómez; Nicolás Burgos
Men's team	Brazil; Hugo Calderano; Vitor Ishiy; Eric Jouti	Canada; Eugene Wang; Edward Ly; Siméon Martin	Argentina; Gastón Alto; Horacio Cifuentes; Santiago Lorenzo
Men's team	Brazil; Hugo Calderano; Vitor Ishiy; Eric Jouti	Canada; Eugene Wang; Edward Ly; Siméon Martin	United States; Jishan Liang; Nandan Naresh; Siddhartha Naresh
Women's singles	Adriana Díaz; Puerto Rico	Bruna Takahashi; Brazil	Zhang Mo; Canada
Women's singles	Adriana Díaz; Puerto Rico	Bruna Takahashi; Brazil	Lily Zhang; United States
Women's doubles	United States; Amy Wang; Rachel Sung	Brazil; Giulia Takahashi; Bruna Takahashi	Chile; Paulina Vega; Daniela Ortega
Women's doubles	United States; Amy Wang; Rachel Sung	Brazil; Giulia Takahashi; Bruna Takahashi	Puerto Rico; Adriana Díaz; Melanie Díaz
Women's team	United States; Lily Zhang; Amy Wang; Rachel Sung	Puerto Rico; Adriana Diaz; Melanie Diaz; Brianna Burgos	Brazil; Bruna Takahashi; Giulia Takahashi; Bruna Alexandre
Women's team	United States; Lily Zhang; Amy Wang; Rachel Sung	Puerto Rico; Adriana Diaz; Melanie Diaz; Brianna Burgos	Chile; Paulina Vega; Daniela Ortega; Zhiying Zeng
Mixed doubles	Cuba; Daniela Fonseca; Jorge Campos	Brazil; Bruna Takahashi; Vitor Ishiy	Chile; Paulina Vega; Nicolás Burgos
Mixed doubles	Cuba; Daniela Fonseca; Jorge Campos	Brazil; Bruna Takahashi; Vitor Ishiy	Canada; Eugene Wang; Zhang Mo

== See also ==
- Table tennis at the 2023 Parapan American Games
- Table tennis at the 2024 Summer Olympics
