= Zhu Chengzhu =

Hong Kong table tennis player

Personal information
- Born: 15 January 1997 (age 29) Houyangzhu, Tiantai County, Zhejiang, China

Sport
- Sport: Table tennis
- Playing style: Right-handed, shakehand grip
- Highest ranking: 44 (7 May 2024)
- Current ranking: 71 (15 July 2025)
Medal record
Women's table tennis
Representing Hong Kong
World Championships
| Bronze medal – third place | 2024 Busan | Team |
Asian Championships
| Bronze medal – third place | 2023 Pyeongchang | Team |
| Bronze medal – third place | 2024 Astana | Team |

Zhu Chengzhu (Chinese: 朱成竹; born 15 January 1997), also known as Zenobia Zhu, is a Hong Kong table tennis player.

== Biography ==
Zhu was born in Houyangzhu, Tiantai County, Zhejiang. Her father Zhu Shike is a retired member of the Tiantai County table tennis team. Her father sent her to table tennis classes when she 7 or 8 years old. Under her teacher Chu Jianwei. She moved to Hong Kong in 2015 and later joined the Hong Kong table tennis team.

In May 2021, the Hong Kong Table Tennis Association announced the Hong Kong team's roster for the Tokyo Olympics. Zhu Chengzhu became a backup player and went to Tokyo with the team.

She won a bronze medal at the 2022 Asian Championships in women's team event. In 2024 World Team Table Tennis Championships she got a bronze medal after losing to Japan 3–0.

She also represented Hong Kong in the 2024 Paris Olympics, competing in the singles and team events.
