= Table tennis at the 2019 Pan American Games – Men's team =

Table tennis – Men's team at the 2019 Pan American Games
- Venue: Polideportivo 3
- Dates: August 8– 10
- Competitors: 36 from 12 nations

Medalists
Gold medal	Kanak Jha; Nikhil Kumar; Nicholas Tio	United States
Silver medal	Gaston Alto; Horacio Cifuentes; Pablo Tabachnik	Argentina
Bronze medal	Hugo Calderano; Eric Jouti; Gustavo Tsuboi	Brazil
Bronze medal	Jorge Campos; Livan Martinez; Andy Pereira	Cuba

The men's team table tennis event at the 2019 Pan American Games was held between 8 and 10 August 2019 at the Polideportivo 3 located at the Villa Deportiva Nacional Videna in Lima, Peru.

== Schedule ==
All times are PET (UTC-5).

Date	Time	Round
August 8, 2019	12:30	Round Robin
August 8, 2019	19:30	Round Robin
August 9, 2019	12:30	Round Robin
August 9, 2019	19:30	Quarterfinals
August 10, 2019	12:30	Semifinals
August 10, 2019	19:30	Final

== Results ==
=== Round Robin ===
The round robin will be used as a qualification round. The twelve teams will be split into groups of three. The top two teams from each group will advance to the first round of playoffs.

==== Group 1 ====
Nation	Pld	W	L	GF	GA
Brazil	2	2	0	6	0
Canada	2	1	1	3	5
Mexico	2	0	2	2	6

8 Aug; 12:30	Brazil	3–0	Canada	Table 1

8 Aug; 19:30	Brazil	3–0	Mexico	Table 2

9 Aug; 12:30	Mexico	2–3	Canada	Table 3

==== Group 2 ====
Nation	Pld	W	L	GF	GA
Cuba	2	2	0	6	1
Dominican Republic	2	1	1	4	4
Chile	2	0	2	1	6

8 Aug; 12:30	Cuba	3–0	Chile	Table 4

8 Aug; 19:30	Dominican Republic	3–1	Chile	Table 3

9 Aug; 12:30	Cuba	3–1	Dominican Republic	Table 4

==== Group 3 ====
Nation	Pld	W	L	GF	GA
United States	2	2	0	6	1
Puerto Rico	2	1	1	4	4
Ecuador	2	0	2	1	6

8 Aug; 12:30	United States	3–0	Ecuador	Table 3

8 Aug; 19:30	United States	3–1	Puerto Rico	Table 1

9 Aug; 12:30	Ecuador	1–3	Puerto Rico	Table 2

==== Group 4 ====
Nation	Pld	W	L	GF	GA
Argentina	2	2	0	6	3
Paraguay	2	1	1	5	4
Peru	2	0	2	2	6

8 Aug; 12:30	Argentina	3–1	Peru	Table 2

8 Aug; 19:30	Argentina	3–2	Paraguay	Table 4

9 Aug; 12:30	Peru	1–3	Paraguay	Table 1

=== Playoffs ===
Quarterfinals
Brazil	3	3	3
Paraguay	1	0	1
Dominican Republic	1	0	3	0
United States	3	3	0	3
Argentina	3	3	3
Puerto Rico	2	0	0
Canada	3	0	2	2
Cuba	1	3	3	3

Semifinals
Brazil	2	3	2	2
United States	3	0	3	3
Argentina	3	3	3
Cuba	2	0	2

Final
United States	3	3	0	1	3
Argentina	1	0	3	3	0

== Final classification ==
Rank	Team	Athlete
1st place, gold medalist(s)	United States	Kanak Jha; Nikhil Kumar; Nicholas Tio
2nd place, silver medalist(s)	Argentina	Gaston Alto; Horacio Cifuentes; Pablo Tabachnik
3rd place, bronze medalist(s)	Brazil	Hugo Calderano; Eric Jouti; Gustavo Tsuboi
3rd place, bronze medalist(s)	Cuba	Jorge Campos; Livan martinez Andy Pereira
5	Paraguay	Marcelo Aguirre; Santiago Osorio; Alejandro Toranzos
5	Dominican Republic	Samuel Galvez; Emil Santos; Wu Jiaji
5	Puerto Rico	Brian Afanador; Daniel Gonzalez; Angel Naranjo
5	Canada	Jeremy Hazin; Marko Medjugorac; Eugene Wang
9	Mexico	Miguel Lara; Marcos Madrid; Ricardo Villa
9	Chile	Gustavo Gómez; Juan Lamadrid; Manuel Moya
9	Ecuador	Alberto Miño; Emiliano Riofrio; Rodrigo Tapia
9	Peru	Bryan Blas; Johan Chavez; Rodrigo Hidalgo
