= 2020 ITTF Pan-America Cup =

Tournament details
- Dates: 7–9 February 2020
- Edition: 4th
- Venue: Mario Morales Coliseum
- Location: Guaynabo, Puerto Rico

Champions
- Men's singles: (Brazil) Hugo Calderano
- Women's singles: (Puerto Rico) Adriana Díaz

The 2020 ITTF Pan-America Cup was a table tennis competition that took place from 7 to 9 February in Guaynabo, Puerto Rico, organised under the authority of the International Table Tennis Federation (ITTF).

== Medalists ==
Event	Gold	Silver	Bronze
Men's singles	(Brazil) Hugo Calderano	(Brazil) Gustavo Tsuboi	(United States) Kanak Jha
Women's singles	(Puerto Rico) Adriana Díaz	(United States) Lily Zhang	(United States) Wu Yue

== Men's singles ==
=== Main draw ===
Round of 16
1	(Brazil) Hugo Calderano	8	11	5	11	11	11
10	(Canada) Jeremy Hazin	11	3	11	7	0	8
11	(United States) Nikhil Kumar	8	6	6	9
5	(Argentina) Horacio Cifuentes	11	11	11	11
8	(Puerto Rico) Brian Afanador	11	11	11	11
15	(Guatemala) Kevin Montufar	4	4	5	3
12	(Dominican Republic) Emil Santos	9	9	8	11	6
4	(Paraguay) Marcelo Aguirre	11	11	11	7	11
3	(Brazil) Gustavo Tsuboi	11	9	15	11	11
13	(Canada) Marko Medjugorac	6	11	13	6	4
14	(Chile) Manuel Moya	7	7	11	8	8
7	(Ecuador) Alberto Miño	11	11	7	11	11
6	(Mexico) Marcos Madrid	11	8	11	11	14
9	(Argentina) Gastón Alto	7	11	9	7	12
16	(Puerto Rico) Héctor Barríos	3	6	7	4
2	(United States) Kanak Jha	11	11	11	11

Quarterfinals
1	(Brazil) Hugo Calderano	5	11	11	11	11
5	(Argentina) Horacio Cifuentes	11	5	3	7	7
8	(Puerto Rico) Brian Afanador	11	11	14	10	9	11	9
4	(Paraguay) Marcelo Aguirre	6	9	16	12	11	7	11
3	(Brazil) Gustavo Tsuboi	11	10	2	11	8	11	11
7	(Ecuador) Alberto Miño	6	12	11	9	11	9	6
6	(Mexico) Marcos Madrid	10	11	7	11	8	7
2	(United States) Kanak Jha	12	8	11	7	11	11

Semifinals
1	(Brazil) Hugo Calderano	11	11	8	11	11
4	(Paraguay) Marcelo Aguirre	9	9	11	5	6
3	(Brazil) Gustavo Tsuboi	11	11	10	4	11	3	11
2	(United States) Kanak Jha	9	6	12	11	4	11	9

Final
1	(Brazil) Hugo Calderano	11	11	11	11	11
3	(Brazil) Gustavo Tsuboi	3	5	13	3	6
Bronze medal
4	(Paraguay) Marcelo Aguirre	3	6	7	4
2	(United States) Kanak Jha	11	11	11	11

== Women's singles ==
=== Main draw ===
Round of 16
1	(Puerto Rico) Adriana Díaz	11	11	11	11
11	(Brazil) Jessica Yamada	5	8	9	8
16	(Dominican Republic) Esmerlyn Castro	3	10	10	5
8	(Mexico) Yadira Silva	11	12	12	11
7	(Chile) Paulina Vega	8	11	12	11	11	11
10	(Argentina) Camila Argüelles	11	5	14	9	5	2
15	(Canada) Sophie Gauthier	7	4	2	12
3	(United States) Wu Yue	11	11	11	14
4	(Canada) Zhang Mo	11	11	11	11
14	(Dominican Republic) Eva Brito	2	7	4	6
12	(Argentina) Ana Codina	9	3	5	9
5	(Brazil) Bruna Takahashi	11	11	11	11
6	(Puerto Rico) Melanie Díaz	11	9	13	11	7	11	11
9	(Chile) Daniela Ortega	8	11	15	7	11	3	9
13	(Guatemala) Mabelyn Enriquez	1	5	1	2
2	(United States) Lily Zhang	11	11	11	11

Quarterfinals
1	(Puerto Rico) Adriana Díaz	11	12	11	13
8	(Mexico) Yadira Silva	8	10	9	11
7	(Chile) Paulina Vega	9	11	10	7	7
3	(United States) Wu Yue	11	8	12	11	11
4	(Canada) Zhang Mo	12	11	11	11
5	(Brazil) Bruna Takahashi	10	5	6	4
6	(Puerto Rico) Melanie Díaz	9	8	8	7
2	(United States) Lily Zhang	11	11	11	11

Semifinals
1	(Puerto Rico) Adriana Díaz	5	11	8	11	11	12
3	(United States) Wu Yue	11	5	11	5	7	10
4	(Canada) Zhang Mo	10	5	7	9
2	(United States) Lily Zhang	12	11	11	11

Final
1	(Puerto Rico) Adriana Díaz	11	11	12	7	9	11
2	(United States) Lily Zhang	4	2	10	11	11	8
Bronze medal
3	(United States) Wu Yue	9	11	23	11	6	13	11
4	(Canada) Zhang Mo	11	6	21	13	11	11	3

== See also ==
- 2020 Europe Top 16 Cup
- 2020 ITTF-ATTU Asian Cup
