= Table tennis at the 2019 Pan American Games – Men's doubles =

Table tennis – Men's doubles at the 2019 Pan American Games
- Venue: Polideportivo 3
- Dates: 4–6 August 2019
- Competitors: 28 from 14 nations

Medalists
Gold medal	Hugo Calderano; Gustavo Tsuboi	Brazil
Silver medal	Gaston Alto; Horacio Cifuentes	Argentina
Bronze medal	Brian Afanador; Daniel González	Puerto Rico
Bronze medal	Emil Santos; Jiaji Wu	Dominican Republic

The men's doubles table tennis event at the 2019 Pan American Games was held on 4 August to 6 August 2019 at the Polideportivo 3 in Lima, Peru.

== Results ==
=== Draw ===
First Round; 4 August 16:00
Hector Gatica (GUA); Heber Moscoso (GUA)	7	5	5	5
Jorge Campos (CUB); Andy Pereira (CUB)	11	11	11	11
Marcos Madrid (MEX); Ricardo Villa (MEX)	10	11	11	11	11
Bryan Blas (PER); Johan Chavez (PER)	12	9	5	4	9
Cecilio Correa (VEN); Marco Navas (VEN)	5	6	11	3	10
Brian Afanador (PUR); Daniel González (PUR)	11	11	9	11	12
Marcelo Aguirre (PAR); Alejandro Toranzos (PAR)	12	8	9	11	13	4	8
Jeremy Hazin (CAN); Eugene Wang (CAN)	10	11	11	6	11	11	11
Emil Santos (DOM); Jiaji Wu (DOM)	11	11	11	8	11
Gustavo Gómez (CHI); Juan Lamadrid (CHI)	8	8	4	11	2
Alberto Miño (ECU); Emiliano Riofrio (ECU)	7	6	11	11	10	11	10
Nikhil Kumar (USA); Nicholas Tio (USA)	11	11	6	4	12	9	12

Quarterfinals; 4 August 20:00
Hugo Calderano (BRA); Gustavo Tsuboi (BRA)	9	8	12	11	11	11	11
Jorge Campos (CUB); Andy Pereira (CUB)	11	11	14	9	8	5	9
Marcos Madrid (MEX); Ricardo Villa (MEX)	5	5	11	11	11	7	8
Brian Afanador (PUR); Daniel González (PUR)	11	11	6	7	6	11	11
Jeremy Hazin (CAN); Eugene Wang (CAN)	14	11	5	4	6	11	8
Emil Santos (DOM); Jiaji Wu (DOM)	12	2	11	11	11	8	11
Nikhil Kumar (USA); Nicholas Tio (USA)	12	6	7	11	14	8
Gaston Alto (ARG); Horacio Cifuentes (ARG)	14	11	11	6	12	11

Semifinals; 5 August 19:00
Hugo Calderano (BRA); Gustavo Tsuboi (BRA)	11	11	9	9	11	14
Brian Afanador (PUR); Daniel González (PUR)	6	6	11	11	6	12
Emil Santos (DOM); Jiaji Wu (DOM)	9	13	11	5	11	10	5
Gaston Alto (ARG); Horacio Cifuentes (ARG)	11	11	7	11	5	12	11

Final; 6 August
Hugo Calderano (BRA); Gustavo Tsuboi (BRA)	11	12	8	11	12	12
Gaston Alto (ARG); Horacio Cifuentes (ARG)	6	14	11	6	10	10
