= Table tennis at the 2019 Pan American Games – Men's singles =

Table tennis – Men's singles at the 2019 Pan American Games
- Venue: Polideportivo 3
- Dates: 5–7 August 2019
- Competitors: 30 from 16 nations

Medalists
Gold medal	Hugo Calderano	Brazil
Silver medal	Jiaji Wu	Dominican Republic
Bronze medal	Eugene Wang	Canada
Bronze medal	Kanak Jha	United States

The men's singles table tennis event at the 2019 Pan American Games will be held from 5 to 7 August 2019 at the Polideportivo 3 in Lima, Peru.

== Results ==
=== Finals ===
Final; 7 August 19:15
Hugo Calderano (BRA)	11	6	8	11	8	11	11
Jiaji Wu (DOM)	8	11	11	7	11	8	2

=== Top half ===
First Round; 5 August 13:15
Rodrigo Hidalgo (PER)	5	9	7	9
Juan Lamadrid (CHI)	11	11	11	11
Emil Santos (DOM)	5	12	2	11	12	4
Nikhil Kumar (USA)	11	10	11	3	14	11
Cecilio Correa (VEN)	6	9	3	11	8
Marcos Madrid (MEX)	11	11	11	6	11
Horacio Cifuentes (ARG)	10	11	6	11	11	11
Rodrigo Tapia (ECU)	12	5	11	6	7	3
Eugene Wang (CAN)	10	12	5	7	12	14	11
Andy Pereira (CUB)	12	10	11	11	10	12	9
Daniel González (PUR)	11	11	7	11	11
Julián Ramos (COL)	7	2	11	6	5
Heber Moscoso (GUA)	4	7	4	2
Marcelo Aguirre (PAR)	11	11	11	11

Second Round; 6 August 11:40
Hugo Calderano (BRA)	11	11	7	11	11
Juan Lamadrid (CHI)	6	7	11	9	1
Nikhil Kumar (USA)	11	4	6	9	12	10
Marcos Madrid (MEX)	7	11	11	11	10	12
Horacio Cifuentes (ARG)	11	9	4	10	12
Eugene Wang (CAN)	9	11	11	12	14
Daniel González (PUR)	6	9	7	2
Marcelo Aguirre (PAR)	11	11	11	11

Quarterfinals; 6 August 17:00
Hugo Calderano (BRA)	11	11	11	11
Marcos Madrid (MEX)	8	5	8	5
Eugene Wang (CAN)	11	11	11	11	8	14
Marcelo Aguirre (PAR)	4	8	13	7	11	12

Semifinals; 7 August 12:00
Hugo Calderano (BRA)	8	11	11	7	11	11
Eugene Wang (CAN)	11	7	6	11	9	6

=== Bottom half ===
First Round; 5 August 13:15
Kanak Jha (USA)	11	11	11	11
José You (HON)	6	3	6	9
Bryan Blas (PER)	3	4	2	8
Gaston Alto (ARG)	11	11	11	11
Jeremy Hazin (CAN)	11	11	11	14
Hector Gatica (GUA)	9	6	8	12
Marco Navas (VEN)	8	3	8	8
Alberto Miño (ECU)	11	11	11	11
Brian Afanador (PUR)	11	7	8	11	11	11
Alejandro Toranzos (PAR)	8	11	11	7	9	8
Ricardo Villa (MEX)	11	12	5	11	10
Gustavo Gómez (CHI)	8	14	11	13	12
Jorge Campos (CUB)	4	11	7	11	5	8
Jiaji Wu (DOM)	11	4	11	9	11	11

Secind Round; 6 August 11:40
Kanak Jha (USA)	13	11	11	11	11
Gaston Alto (ARG)	15	4	7	7	9
Jeremy Hazin (CAN)	11	4	5	3	7
Alberto Miño (ECU)	8	11	11	11	11
Brian Afanador (PUR)	8	11	5	11	5	11	11
Gustavo Gómez (CHI)	11	4	11	3	11	5	8
Jiaji Wu (DOM)	11	5	11	9	11	11
Gustavo Tsuboi (BRA)	5	11	7	11	9	9

Quarterfinals; 6 August 17:00
Kanak Jha (USA)	11	13	7	11	11
Alberto Miño (ECU)	6	11	11	7	6
Brian Afanador (PUR)	10	12	4	7	4
Jiaji Wu (DOM)	12	10	11	11	11

Semifinals; 7 August 12:00
Kanak Jha (USA)	11	5	4	11	7	2
Jiaji Wu (DOM)	9	11	11	8	11	11
