= Table tennis at the 2015 Pan American Games – Men's singles =

Table tennis – Men's singles at the 2015 Pan American Games
- Venue: Atos Markham Pan Am Centre
- Dates: July 22–25
- Competitors: 40 from 14 nations

Medalists
Gold medal	Hugo Calderano	Brazil
Silver medal	Gustavo Tsuboi	Brazil
Bronze medal	Thiago Monteiro	Brazil
Bronze medal	Eugene Wang	Canada

The men's singles table tennis event at the 2015 Pan American Games will be held between July 22 and July 25, 2015 at the Atos Markham Pan Am Centre in Toronto, Canada. The winners of each the individual events will qualify to compete at the 2016 Summer Olympics in Rio de Janeiro, Brazil.

== Schedule ==
All times are Central Standard Time (UTC−6).

Date	Time	Round
July 22, 2015	16:00	Round robin
July 23, 2015	11:30	Round robin
July 24, 2015	10:00	Round robin
July 24, 2015	17:30	First round
July 24, 2015	20:30	Second round
July 25, 2015	11:00	Quarterfinals
July 25, 2015	13:00	Semifinals
July 25, 2015	19:10	Final

== Results ==
=== Round robin ===
The round robin was used as a qualification round. The forty participants were split into groups of four. The top two players from each group advanced to the first round of playoffs. Groups were announced at the technical meeting the day before the competition began.

==== Group A ====
Player	Pld	W	L	GF	GA	PF	PA	Points
Gustavo Tsuboi (BRA)	3	3	0	12	1	146	85	6
Kanak Jha (USA)	3	2	1	8	5	129	123	5
Marko Medjugorac (CAN)	3	1	2	5	10	133	157	4
Geovanny Coello (ECU)	3	0	3	3	12	121	164	3

==== Group B ====
Player	Pld	W	L	GF	GA	PF	PA	Points
Eugene Wang (CAN)	3	3	0	12	1	141	68	6
Diego Rodriguez (PER)	3	2	1	8	6	126	123	5
Emil Santos (DOM)	3	1	2	5	9	109	130	4
Miguel Lara (MEX)	3	0	3	3	12	101	156	3

==== Group C ====
Player	Pld	W	L	GF	GA	PF	PA	Points
Hugo Calderano (BRA)	3	3	0	12	0	89	55	6
Felipe Olivares (CHI)	3	2	1	8	4	79	70	5
Isaac Vila (DOM)	3	1	2	4	8	45	88	4
Jimmy Butler (USA)	3	0	0	0	12	0	0	0

==== Group D ====
Player	Pld	W	L	GF	GA	PF	PA	Points
Thiago Monteiro (BRA)	3	3	0	12	2	153	105	6
Rodrigo Gilabert (ARG)	3	2	1	10	6	162	144	5
Manuel Moya (CHI)	3	1	2	4	10	108	138	4
Johan Chavez (PER)	3	0	3	4	12	125	161	3

==== Group E ====
Player	Pld	W	L	GF	GA	PF	PA	Points
Pierre-Luc Thériault (CAN)	3	3	0	12	1	140	91	6
Andy Pereira (CUB)	3	2	1	9	4	120	95	5
Gustavo Gomez (CHI)	3	1	2	4	11	118	145	4
Samuel Galvez (DOM)	3	0	3	3	12	110	157	3

==== Group F ====
Player	Pld	W	L	GF	GA	PF	PA	Points
Marcos Madrid (MEX)	3	3	0	12	0	132	66	6
Jose Miguel Ramirez (GUA)	3	2	1	8	5	124	108	5
Hector Berrios (PUR)	3	1	2	4	11	110	148	4
Livan Martinez (CUB)	3	0	3	4	12	116	160	3

==== Group G ====
Player	Pld	W	L	GF	GA	PF	PA	Points
Pablo Tabachnik (ARG)	3	3	0	12	3	162	118	6
Brian Afanador (PUR)	3	2	1	9	5	137	120	5
Luis Diaz (VEN)	3	1	2	5	11	136	163	4
Axel Gavilan (PAR)	3	0	3	5	12	138	172	3

==== Group H ====
Player	Pld	W	L	GF	GA	PF	PA	Points
Alberto Mino (ECU)	3	3	0	12	1	141	87	6
Jorge Campos (CUB)	3	2	1	8	6	131	119	5
Alejandro Toranzos (PAR)	3	1	2	6	8	118	137	4
Hector Gatica (GUA)	3	0	3	1	12	95	142	3

==== Group I ====
Player	Pld	W	L	GF	GA	PF	PA	Points
Timothy Wang (USA)	3	3	0	12	7	184	162	6
Gaston Alto (ARG)	3	2	1	11	5	160	121	5
Rodrigo Tápia (ECU)	3	1	2	7	8	132	148	4
Heber Moscoso (GUA)	3	0	3	2	12	101	146	3

==== Group J ====
Player	Pld	W	L	GF	GA	PF	PA	Points
Marcelo Aguirre (PAR)	3	3	0	12	3	158	105	6
Daniel Gonzalez (PUR)	3	2	1	8	8	148	145	5
Ricardo Villa (MEX)	3	1	2	7	10	133	167	4
Bryan Blas (PER)	3	0	3	6	12	154	176	3

=== Playoffs ===
==== Top half ====
First Round
D Gonzalez (PUR)	8	9	6	9
J Campos (CUB)	11	11	11	11
B Afanador (PUR)	8	11	12	13	11	11
D Rodriguez (PER)	11	13	10	11	3	8

Second Round
G Tsuboi (BRA)	8	11	2	11	11	11	11
J Campos (CUB)	11	13	11	9	9	4	7
T Wang (USA)	9	7	12	10	7
P-L Thériault (CAN)	11	11	10	12	11
M Madrid (MEX)	9	6	11	12	6	9
F Olivares (CHI)	11	11	6	10	11	11
B Afanador (PUR)	7	9	2	4
T Monteiro (BRA)	11	11	11	11

Quarterfinals
G Tsuboi (BRA)	1	11	11	11	11
P-L Thériault (CAN)	11	6	6	6	4
F Olivares (CHI)	13	11	2	3	11	11	11
T Monteiro (BRA)	15	7	11	11	6	9	13

Semifinals
G Tsuboi (BRA)	11	4	11	6	6	11	11
T Monteiro (BRA)	8	11	9	11	11	8	9

==== Bottom half ====
First Round
K Jha (USA)	6	11	11	6	3	10
G Alto (ARG)	11	8	9	11	11	12
JM Ramirez (GUA)	11	4	11	11	8	13
R Gilabert (ARG)	8	11	9	3	11	11

Second Round
H Calderano (BRA)	11	11	8	11	11
G Alto (ARG)	9	6	11	5	4
JM Ramirez (GUA)	7	11	10	9	11	13
A Mino (ECU)	11	7	12	11	9	15
P Tabachnik (ARG)	11	4	11	7	11	11
M Aguirre (PAR)	6	11	6	11	8	9
A Pereira (CUB)	8	2	14	5	4
E Wang (CAN)	11	11	12	11	11

Quarterfinals
H Calderano (BRA)	11	11	9	11	11
A Mino (ECU)	8	3	11	3	2
P Tabachnik (ARG)	3	6	3	9
E Wang (CAN)	11	11	11	11

Semifinals
H Calderano (BRA)	10	11	11	11	7	7	11
E Wang (CAN)	12	4	8	9	11	11	7

==== Final ====
Semifinals								Gold medal match
Gustavo Tsuboi (BRA)	11	4	11	6	6	11	11
Thiago Monteiro (BRA)	8	11	9	11	11	8	9	Gustavo Tsuboi (BRA)	6	11	11	7	11	11	2
Hugo Calderano (BRA)	10	11	11	11	7	7	11	Hugo Calderano (BRA)	11	6	4	11	13	9	11
Eugene Wang (CAN)	12	4	8	9	11	11	7
