= Hugo Calderano =

Brazilian table tennis player (born 1996)

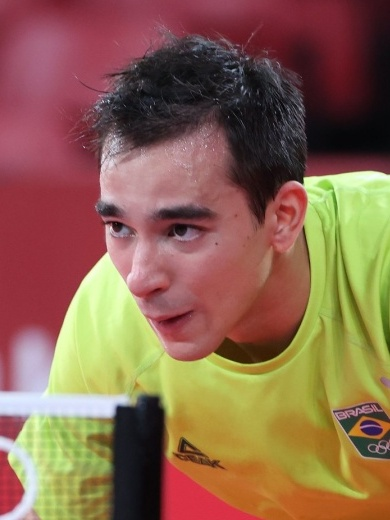
- Calderano at the 2020 Summer Olympics, Japan

Personal information
- Full name: Hugo Marinho Borges Calderano
- Born: 22 June 1996 (age 30) Rio de Janeiro, Brazil
- Height: 1.82 m (6 ft 0 in)
- Weight: 74 kg (163 lb)

Sport
- Sport: Table tennis
- Club: 1. FC Saarbrücken-TT
- Playing style: Right-handed, shakehand grip
- Highest ranking: 2 (9 February 2026)
- Current ranking: 7 (5 October 2026)
Medal record
Men's table tennis
Representing Brazil
World Championships
Silver medal – second place	2025 Doha	Singles
World Cup
Gold medal – first place	2025 Macao	Singles
Bronze medal – third place	2026 Macao	Singles
WTT Cup Finals
Bronze medal – third place	2021 Singapore	Singles
ITTF World Tour Grand Finals
Bronze medal – third place	2018 Incheon	Singles
Pan American Games
Gold medal – first place	2015 Toronto	Singles
Gold medal – first place	2015 Toronto	Team
Gold medal – first place	2019 Lima	Singles
Gold medal – first place	2019 Lima	Doubles
Gold medal – first place	2023 Santiago	Singles
Gold medal – first place	2023 Santiago	Team
Silver medal – second place	2023 Santiago	Doubles
Bronze medal – third place	2019 Lima	Team
Pan American Championships
Gold medal – first place	2017 Cartagena de Indias	Singles
Gold medal – first place	2017 Cartagena de Indias	Team
Gold medal – first place	2021 Lima	Singles
Gold medal – first place	2021 Lima	Team
Gold medal – first place	2022 Santiago	Singles
Gold medal – first place	2022 Santiago	Team
Gold medal – first place	2023 Havana	Singles
Gold medal – first place	2023 Havana	Team
Gold medal – first place	2024 San Salvador	Singles
Gold medal – first place	2025 Rock Hill	Singles
Gold medal – first place	2025 Rock Hill	Mixed doubles
Gold medal – first place	2026 Lima	Singles
Silver medal – second place	2024 San Salvador	Mixed doubles
Bronze medal – third place	2025 Rock Hill	Team
Pan American Cup
Gold medal – first place	2018 Asunción	Singles
Gold medal – first place	2019 Guaynabo	Singles
Gold medal – first place	2020 Guaynabo	Singles
Gold medal – first place	2026 San Francisco	Singles
Latin American Championships
Gold medal – first place	2014 Santo Domingo	Singles
Gold medal – first place	2014 Santo Domingo	Team
Gold medal – first place	2015 Buenos Aires	Singles
Gold medal – first place	2015 Buenos Aires	Team
Gold medal – first place	2016 San Juan	Singles
Gold medal – first place	2016 San Juan	Team
Silver medal – second place	2014 Santo Domingo	Doubles
Latin American Table Tennis Cup
Gold medal – first place	2016 Guatemala City	Singles
Youth Olympic Games
Bronze medal – third place	2014 Nanjing	Singles

Hugo Marinho Borges Calderano (Brazilian Portuguese: [ˈuɡu maˈɾĩɲu ˈbɔʁʒis kawdeˈɾɐ̃nu]; born 22 June 1996) is a Brazilian professional table tennis player and considered the greatest player from the American continent in the history of the sport. In February 2026, he achieved the highest-ranking for a player from the Americas to date, world No. 2 in singles by ITTF/WTT.

Calderano won the 2025 World Cup, his biggest accomplishment, where he defeated the three best ranked players at that time; the world No. 3 Tomokazu Harimoto in the quarterfinal, the world No. 2 Wang Chuqin in the semifinal and the world No. 1 Lin Shidong in the final. That same year, he was runner-up at the 2025 World Table Tennis Championships. He has also placed in the top 3 at the ITTF World Tour Grand Finals, the WTT Champions and the Grand Smash, in addition to placing fourth in the Olympic Games, the first table tennis player from the Americas to reach an Olympic semi-final.

== Early life ==
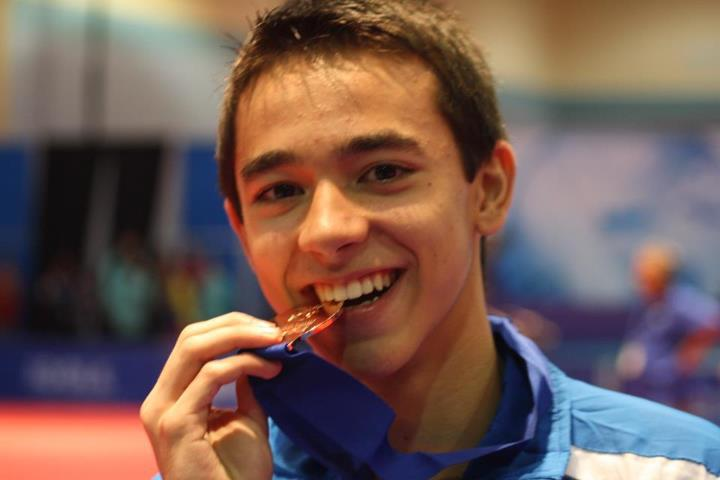
Calderano, 2012

Born in Rio de Janeiro, he started playing table tennis at the age of eight. Since his mother, father and grandfather were physical education teachers, the boy was encouraged to play sports from an early age. From the age of 10 to 12, he was a member of the Rio volleyball team and was pre-school state champion in the long jump.

At the age of 14, Calderano left Rio de Janeiro, and the Laranjeiras club, home of Fluminense, where he trained, for São Caetano do Sul, in São Paulo, to wear the uniform of the Brazilian table tennis team for the first time. In 2010, at the age of 14, he was South American and Latin American Children's Champion. In 2011, at the age of 15, he was Brazilian Youth Champion, Latin American Children's Champion, in Peru, individually and in teams; and Champion of the Argentine Open Youth in individual, team and doubles.

In 2012, at the age of 16, he won an individual bronze medal at the World Cadet Challenge in Puerto Rico; he was South American Youth Champion, in individual, teams and doubles; and champion in youth open competitions in Brazil, Argentina, Mexico and Poland.

In 2013, at the age of 17, he was the youngest table tennis player to win a stage of the World Tour and the first to win stages of the Youth and Adult World Tour in the same year. He won an individual silver medal at the Polish Youth Open, was Champion of the Brazilian Open Adult in individual, and Champion of the Brazilian Open Youth in individual and team.

== International career ==
=== 2014–16 ===
At the age of 18, Calderano made his first Olympic appearance, obtaining bronze at the 2014 Youth Olympic Games in Nanjing, China. He was also a silver medalist in the ITTF Grand Finals under-21 tournament, Japan Open under-21 Champion, Brazilian Adult Singles Champion and Latin American Adult Champion.

From 2014 to 2021, Hugo played for the Ochsenhausen team, in the first division of the German Bundesliga.

In 2015, he won two gold medals at the Pan American Games, in the individual and team events. He was also a Latin American individual and team champion, and a silver medalist in the Qatar Open doubles tournament. He participated in the 2015 World Table Tennis Championships, losing in the 2nd round.

In 2016, Calderano was Latin American Champion in individual and team competitions; Champion of the Latin American Table Tennis Cup, in Guatemala; Kuwait Open under-21 champion; Austrian Open singles silver medal and Swedish Open doubles tournament champion. In October 2016, Calderano, 31st in the world rankings, lost in the round of 16 of the World Cup, in Saarbrücken, Germany, 4–0 (11/8, 11/5, 11/6 and 11/7) to the Chinese Xu Xin, third in the classification. It was the second most important event of the season, behind only the Olympics.

=== 2016 Summer Olympics ===
Calderano participated in the Rio de Janeiro Olympic Games, where he reached the round of 16, a feat that only Hugo Hoyama, a Brazilian legend in the sport, had achieved for Brazil, in Atlanta-1996. Calderano thus finished 9th in the competition.

=== 2017–2020 ===
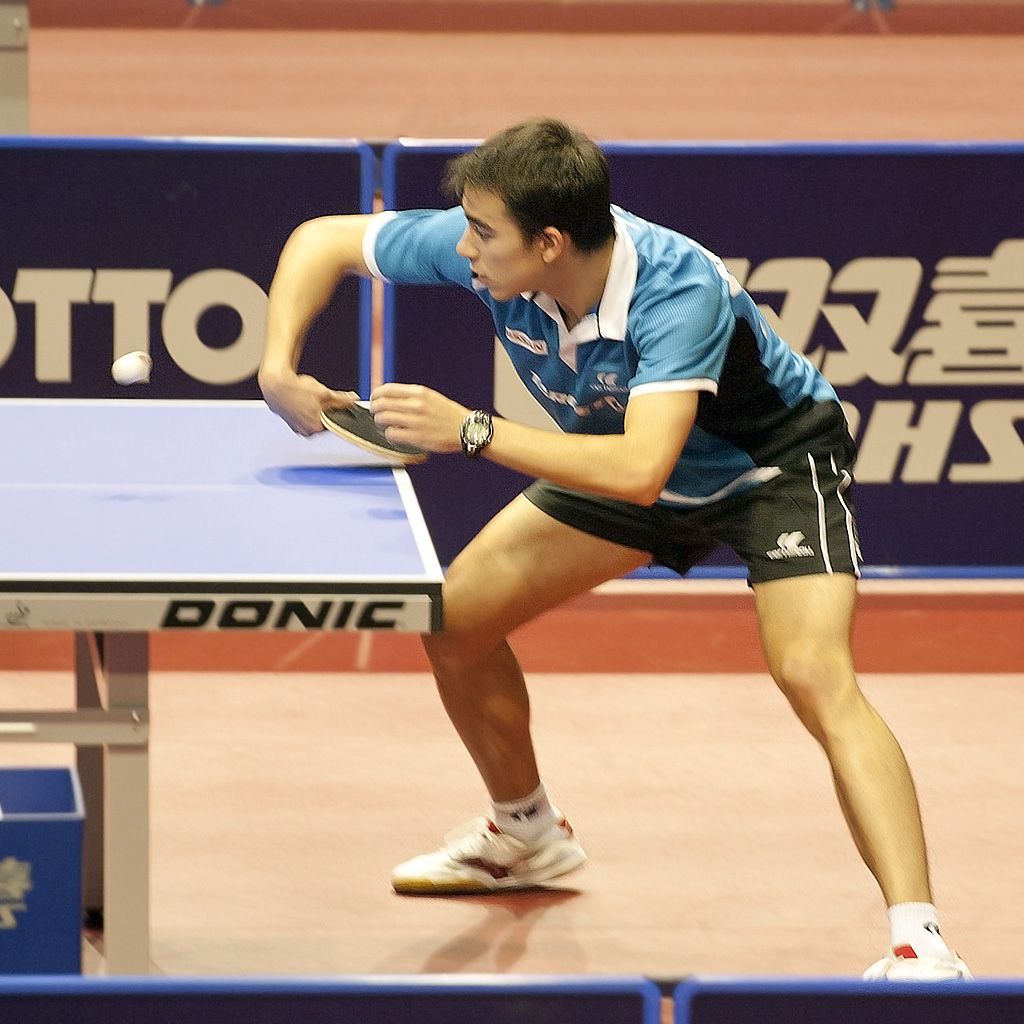
Calderano, 2017

Calderano entered the table tennis world top 20 in January 2017. When he was number 25 in the world rankings, he participated in the 2017 World Table Tennis Championships, losing in the 3rd round to the Chinese Xu Xin, 3rd in the world, by 4 to 1 (partials of 12/10, 7/11, 11/6, 11/3 and 11/4). At the 2017 Pan American Table Tennis Championships held in Cartagena, he obtained two gold medals in singles and team. This year, he was also a singles and doubles bronze medalist at the Czech Republic Open; Singles and doubles champion at the Brazilian Open, and silver medalist in the doubles tournament at the Hungarian Open.

At the 2018 World Team Table Tennis Championships, Calderano reached the quarterfinals playing with Gustavo Tsuboi and Eric Jouti.

At the 2018 ITTF Pan-America Cup, Calderano won the gold medal.

Calderano entered the table tennis world top 10 in July 2018.

In December 2018, Calderano won a historic bronze medal at the 2018 ITTF World Tour Grand Finals. In the semi-final, a few hours after beating the Chinese Fan Zhendong, number 1 in the world and voted the best player of the season, Calderano was defeated by the Japanese Tomokazu Harimoto, fifth in the world rankings, 4–0 (7/11, 8/11, 8/11 and 5/11). The Japanese phenomenon, just 15 years old, played his quarter-final match a day earlier. Calderano had less than five hours to recover from an extremely exhausting duel against the best in the world. Calderano started the year ranked 17th in the world, and arrived at this tournament sixth in the rankings.

Other important results for Calderano in 2018 were the individual silver medal at the Qatar Open, the individual bronze medal at the Hungarian Open, runner-up in the 2017/18 Bundesliga, and the title of Brazilian adult champion.

At the 2019 ITTF Pan-America Cup, Calderano won the gold medal, becoming two-time champion of the tournament.

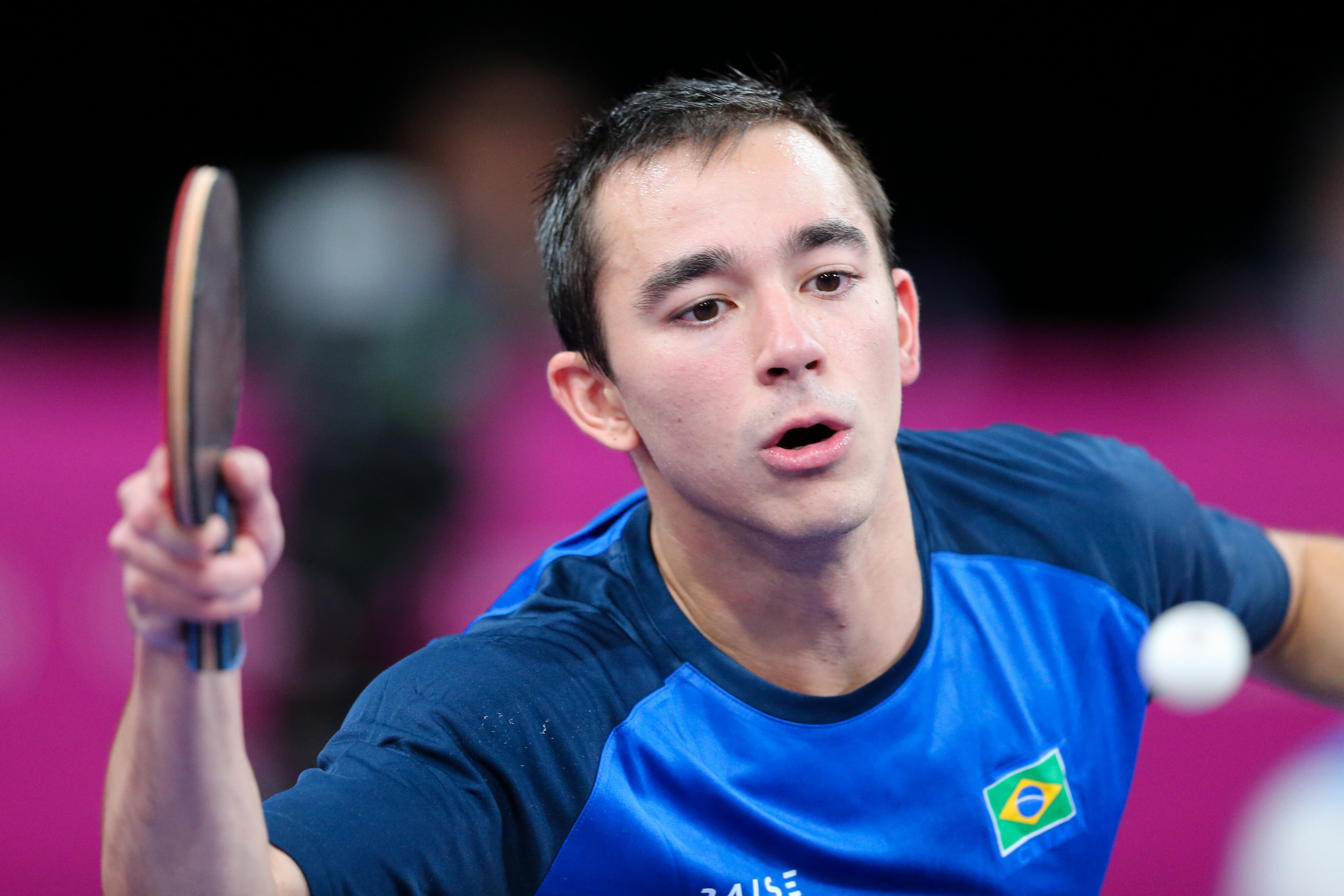
Calderano at the 2019 Pan American Games

At the 2019 Pan American Games, Calderano won gold in singles (becoming two-time champion of the competition) defeating the Chinese, naturalized Dominican, Jiaji Wu in the final, in addition to obtaining gold in doubles, and bronze in teams.

At the 2019 World Table Tennis Championships, Calderano reached the 4th round (round of 16), where he faced Chinese Ma Long, two-time world champion and Olympic champion, and was defeated by 4 sets to 1, partial 8/11, 11/8, 11/1, 11/3 and 11/8.

Other important results for Calderano in 2019 were the individual bronze medal at the Austrian Open, the individual bronze medal at the Czech Republic Open, the 2018/19 Bundesliga title and the 2018/19 German Cup title.

At the 2020 ITTF Pan-America Cup, Calderano won the gold medal, becoming three-time champion of the tournament. In 2020, he was also runner-up in the 2019/20 Bundesliga and in the 2019/20 German Cup.

=== 2021 ===
In 2021, Calderano announced he was leaving the German Bundesliga and switching to the Russian Champion's league to focus more on international competition. However, Calderano will continue to live in Germany and train in the same training center; he will compete in a different league.

Calderano entered World Table Tennis' inaugural event WTT Doha. After receiving a minor scare in the first round to co-patriot Gustavo Tsuboi, Calderano comfortably beat An Jaehyun in the round of 16. However, he lost to Simon Gauzy in the quarterfinals of the WTT Contender Event. In the WTT Star Contender event, he bowed out in the round of 16 to Darko Jorgic after missing his own serve at deuce in the fifth game. Although it briefly looked like Lin Yun-Ju had passed Calderano for the Olympic fourth seed following the results of WTT Doha, in April ITTF amended the seeding system so that Calderano was once again slated to be the fourth seed.

In an interview with JAPAN Forward in July, Calderano named mentality as one of his strong suits and stated that he used to work with a mental coach until the coach died.

Calderano made up for his loss in the WTT Contender Doha and WTT Star Contender Doha earlier in March by winning the title at WTT Star Contender Doha in September. He defeated Liam Pitchford and Darko Jorgic in the semifinal and final, respectively, on his way to victory.

In September 2021, Calderano entered the table tennis world top 5 for the first time.

At the 2021 Pan American Table Tennis Championships, Calderano became two-time Pan American champion in singles and in the team category.

At the 2021 World Table Tennis Championships, Calderano reached the quarter-finals, where he faced the Chinese Liang Jingkun, and went on to open 3 sets to 0, but ended up eliminated 4–3. With this, he achieved the best result in Brazil's history in this tournament, finishing in 5th place

In December 2021, Calderano obtained another historic medal, obtaining bronze at the WTT Cup Finals (a tournament that ended this year's season and featured the 16 best table tennis players of the season, in Singapore. The event replaced the ITTF Grand Finals this year when the international circuit underwent some changes). Calderano ended 2021 as the best season of his career, ranked number four in the world.

=== 2020 Olympic Games ===
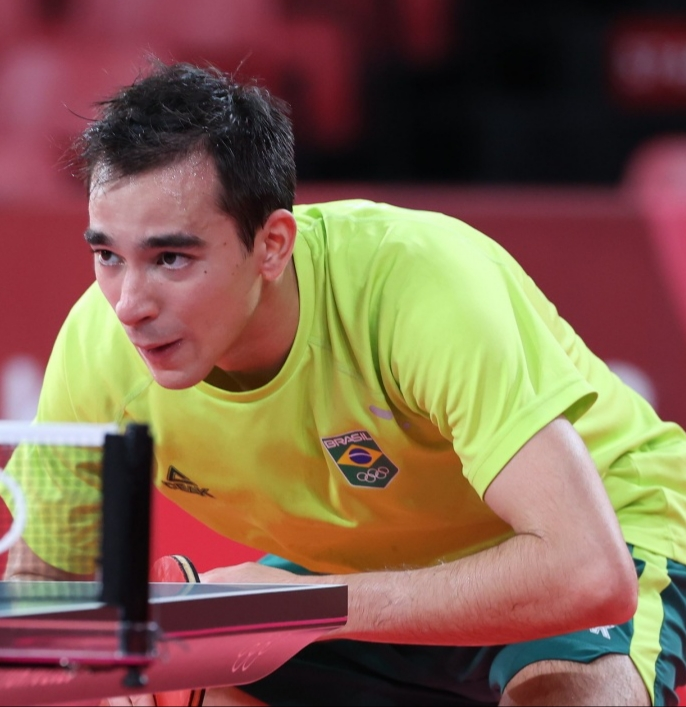
Calderano at Tokyo 2020

In February 2021, Calderano was already three years among the top ten players in the world in table tennis and was ranked sixth in the world rankings. Calderano qualified for the Tokyo 2020 Olympic Games as seed No.4, being the best non-Asian in the world ranking.

By beating the South Korean Jang Woojin, number 12 in the ranking, by 4 sets to 3, he became the first Brazilian and Latin American to reach the quarter-finals of table tennis in the Olympic Games. His Olympic Challenge ended in the quarterfinals with a 2:4 defeat against Dimitrij Ovtcharov, the eventual bronze medallist, finishing in 5th place.

=== 2022–24 ===
In November 2022, at the 2022 Pan American Table Tennis Championships, Calderano became three-time Pan American champion in singles and in the team category. The table tennis player completed seven years undefeated in this continental competition.

In March 2023, Calderano competed in the Singapore Grand Smash, a tournament that features the participation of all the top 20 in the world. He defeated world No. 20 Yukiya Uda in the 2nd round; Darko Jorgic, world No. 10, in the round of 16; Quadri Aruna, number 14 in the world, in the quarter-finals, and only lost to the Chinese Ma Long, number 2 in the world, in the semi-final, ending with a historic bronze.

In May 2023, Calderano went to compete in the 2023 World Table Tennis Championships. However, he had not trained for 10 days, after feeling the injury suffered in his previous competition, the WTT Champions Macao. In Macao, in the defeat to Chinese Ma Long, Calderano slipped during a point and felt pain in the hamstring muscle. Due to this, he was eliminated in the 1st round by Puerto Rican Brian Afanador, 74th in the world rankings, by 4 sets to 2, a table tennis player with whom Calderano had already played four other times, always with the Brazilian winning.

In July 2023, Hugo Calderano reached the mark of 250 consecutive weeks in the world table tennis Top20.

At the WTT Star Contender Ljubljana 2023, in Slovenia, Calderano reached the semifinals, where he faced Chinese Fan Zhendong, number two in the world. After starting losing 2 sets to 0, Calderano tied the game at 2 sets to 2. In the last set, the Chinese managed to win 11 to 7, going to the final and becoming champion of the tournament.

In September 2023, at the 2023 Pan American Table Tennis Championships, Calderano became four-time champion in singles and in the team category, remaining undefeated in this continental competition.

In November 2023, participating in the 2023 Pan American Games in Santiago, Chile, Calderano made history by becoming the first three-time consecutive table tennis champion at the Pan American Games. He also won gold in Team and silver in Doubles.

Other important results for Calderano in 2023 were: Runner-up in the 2022/23 T-League, WTT Contender Doha individual champion, WTT Contender Durban individual champion, and individual WTT Contender Muscat Champion.

In January 2024, he was runner-up in the WTT Star Contender Goa, in India, a tournament that can be equated to a tennis Masters 1000. Calderano beat the German Dimitrij Ovtcharov, 12th in the world rankings, in the semi-final, and had previously beaten the South Korean Lim Jonghoon (18th) and the Swedish Anton Källberg (17th).

At the WTT Champions (a tournament that brings together the 32 best in the world in table tennis) held in the city of Incheon, held at the end of March 2024, Calderano carried out one of the greatest campaigns of his life. In the quarter-finals, he eliminated Frenchman Felix Lebrun, 5th best in the world, who had taken the WTT Star Contender title from him in January. In the semi-final, he beat the current two-time world champion in singles, silver medalist in Tokyo 2020 and number two in the world rankings, the Chinese Fan Zhendong, by 4 sets to 2, reaching the final against another Chinese, Liang Jingkun, number 3 in the world. Calderano finished runner-up in the tournament. He was the only non-Chinese to reach the semi-finals of this tournament, including the men's and women's.

At the 2024 Table Tennis World Cup, now in a new format, Calderano started by winning his 2 games in the group stage by 4 sets to 0. In the round of 16, however, he was drawn to play with the world n.1, the Chinese Wang Chuqin. Calderano played a high-level game with the Chinese, where the Brazilian came out ahead, winning by 2 sets to 1. The leader of the ranking won the next 2 sets, taking the advantage by 3 sets to 2. In the sixth set, very disputed, Chuqin managed to win in a tight 13/11, reaching the quarter-finals.

Playing in the biggest table tennis tournament in Brazil, the WTT Contender Rio de Janeiro, in May 2024, Calderano became champion for the first time, losing just 1 set in the entire competition.

Participating in the WTT Champions in Chongqing, China, Calderano had another excellent campaign by reaching the semifinals of the tournament, eliminating the Olympic medalist Dimitrij Ovtcharov in the 2nd round and defeating the Chinese Liang Jingkun, number three in the world at the moment, for the first time in his career, in the quarter-finals. Having to play the quarterfinals and semifinals on the same day, he ended up being eliminated by fellow Chinese Fan Zhendong. In this tournament, Calderano was the only non-Chinese or non-Chinese descendant to reach the semifinals, both in the men's and women's singles draws.

At the WTT Star Contender Ljubljana 2024, in Slovenia, Calderano reached the semifinals after defeating Swede Mattias Falck, who was runner-up in the 2019 World Championships. He then defeated Cho Dae-seong, 25th in the world, and in the final, Félix Lebrun, 5th in the world (in both games, without losing sets) to obtain a Star Contender trophy for the second time, being one of the biggest titles in his career.

After the title in Slovenia, Calderano secured the number 4 seed position at the Paris Olympics, and decided not to compete in the last two stages of the WTT Circuit, in Lagos, Nigeria, and Tunis, Tunisia, to rest.

In July 2024, he completed 300 consecutive weeks in the top ten of the table tennis world rankings.

=== 2024 Olympic Games ===
At the 2024 Summer Olympics in Paris, in the Men's singles, in the first round, he beat Cuban Andy Pereira (57th in the ITTF ranking) 4–0 (11/8, 11/7, 11/9, 11/4). In the second round, he eliminated Spaniard Álvaro Robles (34th in the ITTF ranking) 4–2 (7/11, 13/11, 11/9, 8/11, 11/3, 11/5). In the round of 16 he faced Frenchman Alexis Lebrun (16th in the ITTF ranking) eliminating him 4–1 (3/11, 11/5, 11/6, 11/3, 11/8). In the quarterfinals, he eliminated South Korean Jang Woo-jin (13th in the ITTF rankings) 4–0 (11/4, 11/7, 11/5, 11/6), becoming the first table tennis player from the Americas to reach an Olympic semifinal, beating the previous record, achieved by himself at the 2020 Olympics. In the semifinals, Calderano played against Swede Truls Möregårdh, 26th in the world but who was runner-up in the 2021 World Championship, and who eliminated Chinese world No. 1 Wang Chuqin in the 2nd round. In a very close match against the surprise of the competition, Calderano ended up losing 4 sets to 2 (10/12, 14/16, 11/7, 7/11, 12/10, 8/11) and went on to fight for the bronze against Félix Lebrun, where he was defeated 4 games to 0. He also participated in the team competition, where Brazil equaled its best ever placing in the Olympics, reaching the quarterfinals.

After his performance at the Olympics in France, Hugo Calderano returned to 3rd place in the world ranking. He had 4,070 points, behind only the Chinese Wang Chuqin, with 7,925 points, and Fan Zhendong, with 5,523.

=== 2024–present ===
In October 2024, Calderano became five-time Pan American Table Tennis Championships champion.

At the 2025 Table Tennis World Cup, he reached the quarterfinals, where he faced the Japanese Tomokazu Harimoto, third in the world rankings. Calderano defeated Harimoto 4 sets to 1, reaching the World Cup semi-finals for the first time, where he played against Wang Chuqin, second in the world rankings. After being down 3 sets to 1, Calderano turned the tables on the Chinese and won 4 sets to 3, reaching the final. He became the first table tennis player from outside Asia and Europe to reach the final. In the final, Calderano faced the world number 1, Chinese Lin Shidong. Calderano triumphed over Lin with a 4 sets to 1 score, obtaining the biggest title of his career.

Right after the World Cup, Calderano reached the rank of world No. 3 for the third time in his career.

At the 2025 World Table Tennis Championships, he won 4 matches, reaching the quarter-finals of the competition, where he faced An Jae-hyun, world No. 17, who eliminated Frenchman Félix Lebrun, world No. 6, 4–3 in the round of 16. Calderano won 4 sets to 1, becoming the first Latin American player to reach the World Championship semi-finals, thus guaranteeing a medal. In the semi-finals, he beaten Chinese Liang Jingkun, world No. 5, 4–3, becoming the first male player from outside Asia and Europe to reach the World Championship final.

On June 22, 2025, Hugo Calderano claimed the title at the WTT Star Contender Ljubljana for the second consecutive time, defeating Felix Lebrun 4–2 in the final. Earlier on that same day, Calderano was runner up on the mixed doubles competition playing alongside fellow Brazilian Bruna Takahashi.

At the WTT Contender in Buenos Aires, he won two titles: in singles, obtaining his 6th individual title in Contenders, and also obtained his first title in mixed doubles together with Bruna Takahashi.

At the WTT Star Contender in Foz do Iguaçu in 2025, the highest level tournament ever held in Brazil, he faced Benedikt Duda in the final and in a very disputed match, he won 4 sets to 3, obtaining his fourth Star Contender title, the second of the year.

Calderano participated in the European Grand Smash, held in Malmö, Sweden, in August. In the mixed doubles event, along with Bruna Takahashi, they reached the quarterfinals of a Smash for the first time. When facing the Japanese duo, seeded No. 4 in the tournament, Sora Matsushima and Satsuki Odo, they led 2 sets to 0, but ended up losing 3 sets to 2, falling one set short of reaching the semifinals and subsequently a medal. In the singles draw, he won some matches, but was eventually eliminated by Germany's Benedikt Duda in the quarterfinals.

At the WTT Champions Macau, he debuted by beating world No. 14 An Jaehyun 3 sets to 0, then defeated world No. 12 Dang Qiu by 3 sets to 1 in the round of 16, world No. 18 Patrick Franziska (4 sets to 2) in the quarterfinals, and world No. 19 Anders Lind (4 sets to 0) in the semifinals (a player who defeated world No. 1 Lin Shidong 4–3 in the quarterfinals). He only lost to Wang Chuqin in the final, which was his 1,000th career match in ITTF-recognized competitions. With this, he regained the position of No. 3 in the world, with 6,050 points, behind only Lin Shidong and Wang Chuqin who had scores close to 9,000 points.

At the China Grand Smash, in mixed doubles, he and Takahashi achieved a historic result by defeating the world No. 5 Spanish duo Robles / Xiao to reach the semifinals, securing a medal, the best result in Brazil's history in mixed doubles. They were the only non-Chinese duo to reach the semifinals of this tournament. In singles, he reached the quarterfinals, being eliminated by world number 9 Xiang Peng in 4 sets to 3.

In October 2025, Calderano became six-time Pan American Table Tennis Championships champion in singles, and won his first title in mixed doubles together with Bruna Takahashi.

In February 2026, after reaching the semi-finals of the WTT Star Contender Doha and winning the Americas Cup title - and counting on the discard of 2000 points from a Grand Smash title by the Chinese Lin Shidong, in addition to the fact that Tomozaku Harimoto and Truls Moregard were unable to surpass him throughout the year - Calderano reached the rank of number 2 in the world, being the first from outside Asia and Europe to achieve such a position in the world rankings. On the same date, he and Bruna Takahashi became the 5th best mixed pair in the world.

At the 2026 Singapore Grand Smash, he and Takahashi reached the mixed doubles final at a Smash for the first time, becoming the first non-Asian pair to do so. They defeated the Hong Kong No. 3 ranked pair Wong/Doo and went on to play against the world No. 1 ranked pair, the Koreans Lim Jonghoon and Shin Yubin, in the finals. Then, they defeated the Olympic medalists 3-0, becoming the first non-Chinese mixed pair to win a WTT Grand Smash.

In March 2026, he reached the quarterfinals of the WTT Champions in Chongqing, and led 3 sets to 1 against Felix Lebrun, but was eliminated after losing 4 sets to 3. Lebrun ended up being the tournament champion.

He reached the semi-finals of the 2026 Table Tennis World Cup, being eliminated only by world no. 1 Wang Chuqin and finishing with the bronze medal.

Calderano finished as runner-up at the 2026 WTT Star Contender Ljubljana, losing only to Japan's Shunsuke Togami by 4 sets to 3.

After reaching the semifinals of the US Grand Smash, he and Takahashi became the world's number 2 mixed doubles pair.

At the WTT Star Contender São José dos Campos 2026, he won the title by defeating Alexis Lebrun 4 sets to 3. With this, he became a three-time consecutive champion of the major tournaments held in Brazil in recent years (WTT Contender Rio 2024, Star Contender Foz do Iguaçu 2025, and now Star Contender São José dos Campos 2026).

At the WTT Champions Macao 2026, he reached the third Champions final of his career, defeating the tournament's top seed, Sora Matsushima, in the quarterfinals and losing only to Truls Möregårdh in the final.

At the China Smash 2026, Calderano defeated world No. 2 Félix Lebrun in the quarterfinals, reaching the second Smash semifinal of his career. He was eliminated by Lin Yun-ju in the semifinals, 4–3.

In October 2026, Calderano became seven-time Pan American Table Tennis Championships champion in singles.

He reached the semifinals of the WTT Champions Montpellier 2026, where he was eliminated in a great match, losing 4 sets to 3 to Jang Woo-jin.

== Clubs ==
- (Brazil) Fluminense (2004–2010)
- (Brazil) São Caetano do Sul (2010–2014)
- (Germany) TTF Liebherr Ochsenhausen (2014–2021)
- (Russia) Gazprom Fakel Orenburg (2021–2022)
- (Japan) Kinoshita (2022)
- (Germany) TTF Liebherr Ochsenhausen (2023–2025)
- (Germany) 1. FC Saarbrücken-TT (2026–)

== Singles titles ==
Year	Tournament	Final opponent	Score	Ref
2013	ITTF World Tour, Americas, Brazil Open	(Brazil) Gustavo Tsuboi	4–2	
2014	Latin American Championships	(Brazil) Gustavo Tsuboi	4–1	
2015	Latin American Championships (2)	(Brazil) Cazuo Matsumoto	4–3	
2015	Pan American Games	(Brazil) Gustavo Tsuboi	4–3	
2016	Latin American Championships (3)	(Ecuador) Alberto Miño	4–0	
2016	Latin American Cup	(Mexico) Marcos Madrid	4–1	
2017	ITTF Challenge, Brazil Open	(India) Anthony Amalraj	4–1	
2017	Pan American Championships	(Brazil) Thiago Monteiro	4–0	
2018	Pan American Cup	(Brazil) Gustavo Tsuboi	4–2	
2019	Pan American Cup (2)	(United States) Kanak Jha	4–1	
2019	Pan American Games (2)	(Dominican Republic) Jiaji Wu	4–3	
2020	Pan American Cup (3)	(Brazil) Gustavo Tsuboi	4–1	
2021	WTT Star Contender Doha	(Slovenia) Darko Jorgić	4–2	
2021	Pan American Championships (2)	(Canada) Eugene Wang	4–2	
2022	WTT Contender Tunis	(France) Alexis Lebrun	4–1	
2022	Pan American Championships (3)	(United States) Kanak Jha	4–0	
2023	WTT Contender Durban	(Ukraine) Yaroslav Zhmudenko	4–0	
2023	WTT Contender Doha	(South Korea) Jang Woo-jin	4–1	
2023	Pan American Championships (4)	(Chile) Nicolás Burgos	4–1	
2023	WTT Contender Muscat	(England) Liam Pitchford	4–3	
2023	Pan American Games (3)	(Cuba) Andy Pereira	4–0	
2024	WTT Contender Rio de Janeiro	(South Korea) An Jae-hyun	4–0	
2024	WTT Star Contender Ljubljana	(France) Félix Lebrun	4–0	
2024	Pan American Championships (5)	(Brazil) Vitor Ishiy	4–0	
2025	World Cup	(China) Lin Shidong	4–1	
2025	WTT Star Contender Ljubljana (2)	(France) Félix Lebrun	4–2	
2025	WTT Contender Buenos Aires	(Japan) Mizuki Oikawa	4–1	
2025	WTT Star Contender Foz do Iguaçu	(Germany) Benedikt Duda	4–3	
2025	Pan American Championships (6)	(United States) Kanak Jha	4–1	
2026	ITTF Americas Cup	(United States) Kanak Jha	4–1	
2026	WTT Star Contender São José dos Campos	(France) Alexis Lebrun	4–3	
2026	Pan American Championships (7)	(Brazil) Guilherme Teodoro	4–1	

== Best results by type of tournament ==
=== Singles ===
In February 2026, Calderano peaked at No. 2 in the world single rankings.

- Pan American Table Tennis Championships: Champion (2017, 2021, 2022, 2023, 2024, 2025, 2026)
- Pan American Games: Champion (2015, 2019, 2023)
- WTT Contender: Champion (Tunis 2022, Durban 2023, Doha 2023, Muscat 2023, Rio 2024, Buenos Aires 2025).
- WTT Star Contender: Champion (Doha 2021, Ljubljana 2024, Ljubljana 2025, Foz do Iguaçu 2025, São José dos Campos 2026).
- WTT Champions: Runner-up (Incheon 2024, Macau 2025, Macau 2026)
- Grand Smash: Bronze medal (Singapore 2023, Beijing 2026)
- ITTF World Tour Grand Finals: Bronze medal (Incheon 2018)
- WTT Cup Finals: Semifinals (Singapore 2021)
- Table Tennis World Cup: Champion (Macau 2025)
- World Table Tennis Championships: Runner-up (Doha 2025)
- Olympic Games: Semifinals (Paris 2024)

=== Doubles ===
In 2017, the Calderano/Tsuboi duo was the 3rd best in the world men's doubles ranking, behind the Japanese Masataka Morizono and Yuya Oshima and the Chinese Xu Xin and Zhang Jike.

- Pan American Games: Champion (2019)
- Super Series: Silver medal (Qatar Open 2015)
- Hungarian Open: Silver medal (2016)
- Swedish Open: Gold medal (2017)
- Rio de Janeiro Open: Gold medal (2017)
- World Table Tennis Championships: Round of 16 (Suzhou 2015, Düsseldorf 2017)

=== Mixed doubles ===
In July 2026, the Calderano/Takahashi duo was ranked 2nd in the world, this being the best ranking obtained by Calderano in this modality, despite having already made partnerships with other players.

Calderano's best individual results in this modality:

- Pan American Table Tennis Championships: Champion (2025)
- WTT Contender: Champion (Buenos Aires 2025)
- WTT Star Contender: Runner-up (Ljubljana 2025, São José dos Campos 2026)
- Grand Smash: Champion (Singapore 2026)
- WTT Finals: Group stage (Hong Kong 2025)
- World Table Tennis Championships: 3rd round (Suzhou 2015)

=== Team ===
From April 2021 to June 2023, the Brazil team was the 6th best in the world.

- Pan American Table Tennis Championships: Champion (2017, 2021, 2022, 2023)
- Pan American Games: Champion (2015, 2023)
- Table Tennis World Cup: Quarterfinals (Dubai 2015, London 2018, Tokyo 2019)
- World Table Tennis Championships: Quarterfinals (Halmstad 2018, London 2026)
- Olympic Games: Quarterfinals (Tokyo 2020, Paris 2024)

== Major results ==
Year	Venue	Singles	Doubles	Mixed Doubles	Team
Olympics
2016	Rio de Janeiro, Brazil	Round of 16			Round of 16
2021	Tokyo, Japan	Quarterfinals			Quarterfinals
2024	Paris, France	Fourth place			Quarterfinals
World Championships
2013	Paris, France	Round of 128	Round of 32		
2015	Suzhou, China	Round of 64	Round of 16	Round of 32	
2017	Düsseldorf, Germany	Round of 32	Round of 16		
2019	Budapest, Hungary	Round of 16			
2021	Houston, United States	Quarterfinals			
2023	Durban, South Africa	Round of 128			
2025	Doha, Qatar	Silver Medal		Round of 32	
World Championships (Team)
2014	Tokyo, Japan				17th place
2016	Kuala Lumpur, Malaysia				26th place
2018	Halmstad, Sweden				Quarterfinals
2022	Chengdu, China				Round of 16
2026	(United Kingdom) London, England				Quarterfinals
World Cup
2016	Saarbrücken, Germany	Round of 16			
2018	Paris, France	Group stage			
2019	Chengdu, China	Quarterfinals			
2020	Weihai, China	Round of 16			
2024	Macau, China	Round of 16			
2025	Macau, China	Gold Medal			
2026	Macau, China	Bronze Medal			
ITTF World Tour Grand Finals
2018	Incheon, South Korea	Bronze Medal			
2019	Zhengzhou, China	Quarterfinals			
2020	Zhengzhou, China	Quarterfinals			
WTT Finals
2021	Singapore	Bronze Medal			
2022	Xinxiang, China	Round of 16			
2023	Doha, Qatar	Round of 16			
2024	Fukuoka, Japan	Round of 16			
2025	Hong Kong, China	Round of 16		Group stage	
2026	Hong Kong, China				
ITTF Team World Cup (Team)
2015	Dubai, United Arab Emirates				Quarterfinals
2018	London, England				Quarterfinals
2019	Tokyo, Japan				Quarterfinals
Pan American Games
2015	Toronto, Canada	Gold Medal			Gold Medal
2019	Lima, Peru	Gold Medal	Gold Medal		Bronze Medal
2023	Santiago, Chile	Gold Medal	Silver Medal		Gold Medal
Pan American Championships
2017	Cartagena, Colombia	Gold Medal			Gold Medal
2021	Lima, Peru	Gold Medal			Gold Medal
2022	Santiago, Chile	Gold Medal			Gold Medal
2023	Havana, Cuba	Gold Medal			Gold Medal
2024	San Salvador, El Salvador	Gold Medal		Silver Medal	Quarterfinals
2025	Rock Hill, United States	Gold Medal		Gold Medal	
2026	Lima, Peru	Gold Medal			

=== Senior level ===
- Men's singles

Tournaments		2021	2022	2023	2024	2025	2026
WTT Grand Smash	Singapore			SF		R16	R16
WTT Grand Smash	(Sweden) Europe					QF	QF
WTT Grand Smash	China				QF	QF	SF
WTT Grand Smash	(Saudi Arabia) Saudi				R16		
WTT Grand Smash	United States						R16
WTT Champions	(South Korea) Incheon				F	QF	
WTT Champions	(China) Chongqing				SF		QF
WTT Champions	Macau			QF		F	F
WTT Champions	(Germany) Frankfurt				QF	R16	R16
WTT Champions	(France) Montpellier				R16		SF
WTT Champions	(China) Xinxiang			R16			
WTT Champions	(Hungary) Budapest		R16				
WTT Champions	(Japan) Yokohama						
WTT Star Contender
WTT Star Contender	(Qatar) Doha	W	QF		R16		SF
WTT Star Contender	(Hungary) Budapest		R16				
WTT Star Contender	(Slovenia) Ljubljana			SF	W	W	F
WTT Star Contender	(India) Goa				F		
WTT Star Contender	(Brazil) Foz do Iguaçu, São José dos Campos					W	W
WTT Contender	(Tunisia) Tunis		W				
WTT Contender	(South Africa) Durban			W			
WTT Contender	(Qatar) Doha			W			
WTT Contender	(Oman) Muscat			W			
WTT Contender	(Brazil) Rio de Janeiro				W		
WTT Contender	(Argentina) Buenos Aires					W	

Key
W	F	SF	QF	#R

(W) winner; (F) finalist; (SF) semifinalist; (QF) quarterfinalist; (#R) rounds

== See also ==
- Takahashi - Calderano doubles team

Awards
Preceded by Henrique Avancini	Brazilian Athlete of the Year (Fan's Choice); 2019	Succeeded by Incumbent
