= Table tennis at the 2015 Pan American Games – Men's team =

Table tennis – Men's team at the 2015 Pan American Games
- Venue: Atos Markham Pan Am Centre
- Dates: July 19– 21
- Competitors: 36 from 12 nations

Medalists
Gold medal	Hugo Calderano; Thiago Monteiro; Gustavo Tsuboi	Brazil
Silver medal	Marcelo Aguirre; Axel Gavilan; Alejandro Toranzos	Paraguay
Bronze medal	Marko Medjugorak; Pierre-Luc Thériault; Eugene Wang	Canada
Bronze medal	Brian Afanador; Héctor Berríos; Daniel González	Puerto Rico

The men's team table tennis event at the 2015 Pan American Games was held between July 19 and 21, 2015 at the Atos Markham Pan Am Centre in Toronto, Canada.

== Schedule ==
All times are Central Standard Time (UTC-6).

Date	Time	Round
July 19, 2015	12:30	Round Robin
July 20, 2015	12:00	Round Robin
July 20, 2015	19:00	Quarterfinals
July 21, 2015	12:00	Semifinals
July 21, 2015	19:10	Final

== Results ==
=== Round Robin ===
The round robin will be used as a qualification round. The twelve teams will be split into groups of three. The top two teams from each group will advance to the first round of playoffs.

==== Group A ====
Nation	Pld	W	L	GF	GA
Brazil	2	2	0	6	0
United States	2	1	1	3	5
Ecuador	2	0	2	2	6

19 July; 12:30	Report	Brazil	3–0	Ecuador	Markham Pan Am Centre

19 July; 19:00	Report	Brazil	3–0	United States	Markham Pan Am Centre

20 July; 12:00	Report	Ecuador	2–3	United States	Markham Pan Am Centre

==== Group B ====
Nation	Pld	W	L	GF	GA
Paraguay	2	1	1	5	4
Chile	2	1	1	5	5
Cuba	2	1	1	4	5

19 July; 12:30	Report	Paraguay	3–1	Cuba	Markham Pan Am Centre

19 July; 19:00	Report	Chile	2–3	Cuba	Markham Pan Am Centre

20 July; 12:00	Report	Chile	3–2	Paraguay	Markham Pan Am Centre

==== Group C ====
Nation	Pld	W	L	GF	GA
Argentina	2	2	0	6	2
Mexico	2	1	1	5	5
Dominican Republic	2	0	2	3	6

19 July; 12:30	Report	Dominican Republic	0–3	Argentina	Markham Pan Am Centre

19 July; 19:00	Report	Mexico	2–3	Argentina	Markham Pan Am Centre

20 July; 12:00	Report	Dominican Republic	2–3	Mexico	Markham Pan Am Centre

==== Group D ====
Nation	Pld	W	L	GF	GA
Puerto Rico	2	2	0	6	2
Canada	2	1	1	5	3
Guatemala	2	0	2	0	6

19 July; 12:30	Report	Guatemala	0–3	Canada	Markham Pan Am Centre
Score by game:
Emil Santos	0–3	Eugene Wang
Hector Gatica	1–3	Pierre-Luc Thériault
Heber Moscoso/Hector Gatica	0–3	Marko Medjugorac/Pierre-Luc Thériault

19 July; 19:00	Report	Canada	2–3	' Puerto Rico	Markham Pan Am Centre

20 July; 12:00	Report	Puerto Rico	3–0	Guatemala	Markham Pan Am Centre

=== Playoffs ===
Quarterfinals
Chile	2	1	1
Brazil	3	3	3
Argentina	0	2	2
Canada	3	3	3
United States	3	2	2	3	0
Puerto Rico	2	3	3	0	3
Paraguay	3	3	3
Mexico	1	2	1

Semifinals
Brazil	3	3	3
Canada	2	1	0
Puerto Rico	1	0	2
Paraguay	3	3	3

Final
Brazil	3	3	3
Paraguay	0	0	0

== Final classification ==
Rank	Team	Athlete
1st place, gold medalist(s)	Brazil	Hugo Calderano; Thiago Monteiro; Gustavo Tsuboi
2nd place, silver medalist(s)	Paraguay	Marcelo Aguirre; Axel Gavilan; Alejandro Toranzos
3rd place, bronze medalist(s)	Canada	Marko Medjugorac; Pierre-Luc Thériault; Eugene Wang
3rd place, bronze medalist(s)	Puerto Rico	Brian Afanador; Héctor Berríos; Daniel González
5	Argentina	Gaston Alto; Rodrigo Gilabert; Pablo Tabachnik
5	Chile	Gustavo Gómez; Manuel Moya; Felipe Olivares
5	Mexico	Miguel Lara; Marcos Madrid; Ricardo Villa
5	United States	Jimmy Butler; Kanak Jha; Timothy Wang
9	Cuba	Jorge Campos; Livan Martinez; Andy Pereira
9	Dominican Republic	Samuel Galvez; Emil Santos; Isaac Vila
9	Ecuador	Geovanny Coello; Alberto Mino; Rodrigo Tapia
9	Guatemala	Hector Gatica; Heber Moscoso; Jose Miguel Ramirez
