= Pan American Table Tennis Cup =

Table tennis competition

The Pan American Table Tennis Cup is an annual table tennis competition held in the Americas since 2017. It consists of men's and women's singles events. Only 16 invited players and no more than 2 players per association are allowed to participate in each event. Since its inception, it is recognised as the qualification event for the Table Tennis World Cup. The competitions are organized as a joint effort of the Latin American Table Tennis Union and the Northern American Table Tennis Union. The event is sanctioned by the International Table Tennis Federation (ITTF).

== Results ==
=== Men's singles ===
Year	Host City	Gold	Silver	Bronze	Ref.
2017	San Jose, Costa Rica	(Brazil) Gustavo Tsuboi	(Brazil) Eric Jouti	(Argentina) Gastón Alto	
2018	Asunción, Paraguay	(Brazil) Hugo Calderano	(Brazil) Gustavo Tsuboi	(United States) Kanak Jha	
2019	Guaynabo, Puerto Rico	(Brazil) Hugo Calderano (2)	(United States) Kanak Jha	(Brazil) Gustavo Tsuboi	
2020	Guaynabo, Puerto Rico	(Brazil) Hugo Calderano (3)	(Brazil) Gustavo Tsuboi	(United States) Kanak Jha	
2024	Corpus Christi, United States	(Canada) Edward Ly	(Chile) Nicolás Burgos	(Ecuador) Alberto Mino	
2025	San Francisco, United States	(United States) Kanak Jha	(Canada) Eugene Wang	(Brazil) Eric Jouti (Argentina) Horacio Cifuentes	
2026	San Francisco, United States	(Brazil) Hugo Calderano (4)	(United States) Kanak Jha	(Canada) Eugene Wang (Argentina) Horacio Cifuentes	

=== Women's singles ===
Year	Host City	Gold	Silver	Bronze	Ref.
2017	San Jose, Costa Rica	(United States) Lily Zhang	(Canada) Zhang Mo	(United States) Wu Yue	
2018	Asunción, Paraguay	(Canada) Zhang Mo	(United States) Wu Yue	(Brazil) Bruna Takahashi	
2019	Guaynabo, Puerto Rico	(Puerto Rico) Adriana Díaz	(Canada) Zhang Mo	(United States) Wu Yue	
2020	Guaynabo, Puerto Rico	(Puerto Rico) Adriana Díaz (2)	(United States) Lily Zhang	(United States) Wu Yue	
2024	Corpus Christi, United States	(Brazil) Bruna Takahashi	(United States) Amy Wang	(Canada) Zhang Mo	
2025	San Francisco, United States	(Brazil) Bruna Takahashi (2)	(United States) Lily Zhang	(United States) Amy Wang (Canada) Zhang Mo	
2026	San Francisco, United States	(United States) Amy Wang	(United States) Lily Zhang	(Brazil) Bruna Takahashi (Canada) Zhang Mo	

== Medal table ==
2017–2026
Rank	Nation	Gold	Silver	Bronze	Total
1	Brazil (BRA)	7	3	4	14
2	United States (USA)	3	7	6	16
3	Canada (CAN)	2	3	4	9
4	Puerto Rico (PUR)	2	0	0	2
5	Chile (CHI)	0	1	0	1
6	Argentina (ARG)	0	0	3	3
7	Ecuador (ECU)	0	0	1	1
Totals (7 entries)		14	14	18	46

== See also ==
- Pan American Table Tennis Championships
- Table tennis at the Pan American Games
