= Table tennis at the 2020 Summer Olympics – Men's singles =

Table tennis – men's singles at the Games of the XXXII Olympiad
- Venue: Tokyo Metropolitan Gymnasium
- Date: 24–30 July 2021
- Competitors: 65 from 43 nations

Medalists
1st place, gold medalist(s)		Ma Long	China
2nd place, silver medalist(s)		Fan Zhendong	China
3rd place, bronze medalist(s)		Dimitrij Ovtcharov	Germany

The men's singles table tennis event was part of the table tennis programme at the 2020 Summer Olympics in Tokyo. The event took place from 24 July to 30 July 2021 at Tokyo Metropolitan Gymnasium.

== Schedule ==
Legend
P	Preliminary round	¼	Quarter-finals	½	Semi-finals	F	Final

Sat 24	Sun 25	Mon 26	Tue 27	Wed 28	Thu 29	Fri 30
P				¼	½	F

== Seeds ==
The top 16 seeded players qualified directly to the third round.

1. Fan Zhendong (CHN) (Final, silver medalist)
2. Ma Long (CHN) (champion, gold medalist)
3. Tomokazu Harimoto (JPN) (fourth round)
4. Hugo Calderano (BRA) (quarterfinals)
5. Lin Yun-ju (TPE) (Semifinals, fourth place)
6. Mattias Falck (SWE) (third round)
7. Dimitrij Ovtcharov (GER) (Semifinals, bronze medalist)
8. Timo Boll (GER) (fourth round)
9. Jang Woo-jin (KOR) (fourth round)
10. Jeoung Young-sik (KOR) (quarterfinals)
11. Liam Pitchford (GBR) (third round)
12. Koki Niwa (JPN) (fourth round)
13. Wong Chun Ting (HKG) (third round)
14. Simon Gauzy (FRA) (fourth round)
15. Quadri Aruna (NGR) (third round)
16. Marcos Freitas (POR) (fourth round)

The players seeded from 17 to 32 qualified directly to the second round.

17. Robert Gardos (AUT) (second round)
18. Darko Jorgić (SLO) (quarterfinals)
19. Chuang Chih-yuan (TPE) (fourth round)
20. Sharath Kamal (IND) (third round)
21. Kanak Jha (USA) (second round)
22. Jonathan Groth (DEN) (third round)
23. Tomislav Pucar (CRO) (second round)
24. Wang Yang (SVK) (third round)
25. Gustavo Tsuboi (BRA) (fourth round)
26. Sathiyan Gnanasekaran (IND) (second round)
27. Emmanuel Lebesson (FRA) (third round)
28. Omar Assar (EGY) (quarterfinals)
29. Anton Källberg (SWE) (third round)
30. Kirill Gerassimenko (KAZ) (third round)
31. Ahmed Saleh (EGY) (second round)
32. Daniel Habesohn (AUT) (third round)

== Draw ==
=== Finals ===
Semifinals
1	Fan Zhendong (CHN)	6	11	14	13	11	9	11
5	Lin Yun-ju (TPE)	11	9	12	15	9	11	8
7	Dimitrij Ovtcharov (GER)	11	8	11	11	7	11	9
2	Ma Long (CHN)	13	11	9	9	11	5	11

Gold medal match
1	Fan Zhendong (CHN) (silver)	4	12	8	9	11	7
2	Ma Long (CHN) (gold)	11	10	11	11	3	11
Bronze medal match
5	Lin Yun-ju (TPE)	11	11	11	4	11	13	7
7	Dimitrij Ovtcharov (GER) (bronze)	13	9	6	11	4	15	11

=== Top half ===
==== Section 1 ====
Second round
27	E Lebesson (FRA)	11	11	12	13
33	A Gaćina (CRO)	6	8	10	11
32	D Habesohn (AUT)	11	11	11	6	12
57	C Chew Z Y (SGP)	7	9	8	11	10
31	A Saleh (EGY)	11	7	11	3	6
35	P Gionis (GRE)	13	11	9	11	11
30	K Gerassimenko (KAZ)	3	6	11	11	2	11	11
41	L Jančařík (CZE)	11	11	7	8	11	9	4

Third round
1	Fan ZD (CHN)	11	11	11	11
27	E Lebesson (FRA)	3	4	3	4
16	M Freitas (POR)	11	3	11	11	11	2	11
32	D Habesohn (AUT)	7	11	7	6	13	11	3
10	Jeoung Y-s (KOR)	7	11	8	10	12	11	14
35	P Gionis (GRE)	11	7	11	12	10	6	12
8	T Boll (GER)	7	11	11	11	11
30	K Gerassimenko (KAZ)	11	6	7	2	1

Fourth round
1	Fan ZD (CHN)	11	11	11	5	11
16	M Freitas (POR)	6	6	2	11	3
10	Jeoung Y-s (KOR)	11	7	11	11	11
8	T Boll (GER)	8	11	7	9	4

Quarterfinals
1	Fan ZD (CHN)	12	11	11	11
10	Jeoung Y-s (KOR)	10	9	6	5

==== Section 2 ====
Second round
29	A Källberg (SWE)	11	11	11	11
55	N Kumar (USA)	7	5	6	5
25	G Tsuboi (BRA)	11	9	13	11	11
47	O Ionescu (ROU)	6	11	11	9	9
18	D Jorgić (SLO)	11	12	5	9	5	15	11
42	Á Robles (ESP)	2	10	11	11	11	13	8
26	S Gnanasekaran (IND)	7	11	11	11	9	10	6
50	Lam S H (HKG)	11	7	4	5	11	12	11

Third round
5	Lin Y-j (TPE)	11	9	11	11	11
29	A Källberg (SWE)	5	11	7	7	9
15	Q Aruna (NGR)	15	9	6	11	7	6
25	G Tsuboi (BRA)	13	11	11	7	11	11
11	L Pitchford (GBR)	8	11	10	13	9	10
18	D Jorgić (SLO)	11	7	12	11	11	12
3	T Harimoto (JPN)	11	13	8	12	12
50	Lam S H (HKG)	9	11	11	10	10

Fourth round
5	Lin Y-j (TPE)	11	11	11	9	9	13
25	G Tsuboi (BRA)	5	7	2	11	11	11
18	D Jorgić (SLO)	10	11	11	10	8	11	11
3	T Harimoto (JPN)	12	9	3	12	11	7	7

Quarterfinals
5	Lin Y-j (TPE)	11	11	11	11
18	D Jorgić (SLO)	4	7	4	6

=== Bottom half ===
==== Section 3 ====
Second round
23	T Pucar (CRO)	9	8	9	10
40	B Tokič (SLO)	11	11	11	12
17	R Gardos (AUT)	11	11	4	10	6
36	P Drinkhall (GBR)	13	6	11	12	11
24	Wang Y (SVK)	11	11	11	11
62	D Powell (AUS)	4	4	3	3
21	K Jha (USA)	9	11	9	11	7	4
37	K Skachkov (ROC)	11	9	11	0	11	11

Third round
4	H Calderano (BRA)	13	11	7	11	12
40	B Tokič (SLO)	11	7	11	9	10
9	Jang W-j (KOR)	7	12	11	11	11
36	P Drinkhall (GBR)	11	10	8	8	7
12	K Niwa (JPN)	11	11	11	12
24	Wang Y (SVK)	6	8	3	10
7	D Ovtcharov (GER)	13	11	13	11
37	K Skachkov (ROC)	11	3	11	4

Fourth round
4	H Calderano (BRA)	11	9	6	11	4	11	11
9	Jang W-j (KOR)	7	11	11	9	11	5	6
12	K Niwa (JPN)	4	11	0	7	9
7	D Ovtcharov (GER)	11	7	11	11	11

Quarterfinals
4	H Calderano (BRA)	11	11	8	7	8	2
7	D Ovtcharov (GER)	7	5	11	11	11	11

==== Section 4 ====
Second round
28	O Assar (EGY)	15	11	11	6	8	9	11
45	Kou L (UKR)	13	6	4	11	11	11	4
19	Chuang C-y (TPE)	5	11	13	9	5	11	11
44	H Cifuentes (ARG)	11	3	11	11	11	8	7
22	J Groth (DEN)	12	12	11	3	12
39	B Majoros (HUN)	10	10	4	11	10
20	S Kamal (IND)	2	11	11	9	11	11
38	T Apolónia (POR)	11	8	5	11	6	9

Third round
6	M Falck (SWE)	5	11	11	11	11	6	8
28	O Assar (EGY)	11	6	8	13	4	11	11
13	Wong C T (HKG)	11	5	2	2	8
19	Chuang C-y (TPE)	9	11	11	11	11
14	S Gauzy (FRA)	12	11	11	11
22	J Groth (DEN)	10	9	9	5
2	Ma L (CHN)	11	8	13	11	11
20	S Kamal (IND)	7	11	11	4	4

Fourth round
28	O Assar (EGY)	11	6	11	7	11	5	11
19	Chuang C-y (TPE)	8	11	8	11	9	11	7
14	S Gauzy (FRA)	6	11	4	7	5
2	Ma L (CHN)	11	9	11	11	11

Quarterfinals
28	O Assar (EGY)	7	9	6	13	6
2	Ma L (CHN)	11	11	11	11	11

== Preliminary rounds ==
=== Top half ===
==== Section 1 ====
First round
33	A Gaćina (CRO)	11	11	11	13
59	D Fanny (TOG)	5	6	3	11
43	I Diaw (SEN)	4	11	3	11	11	10
57	C Chew Z Y (SGP)	11	4	11	13	3	12
35	P Gionis (GRE)	11	11	11	11
53	Z Peto (SRB)	6	8	9	8
41	L Jančařík (CZE)	11	11	11	11
56	A Alkhadrawi (KSA)	9	5	4	4

==== Section 2 ====
Preliminary round
55	N Kumar (USA)	11	11	7	11	11
65	L Enkhbat (MGL)	2	6	11	5	8

First round
46	A Miño (ECU)	11	8	8	7	13	6
55	N Kumar (USA)	8	11	11	11	11	11
47	O Ionescu (ROU)	11	13	7	11	11
60	C Yan (AUS)	7	11	11	8	6
42	Á Robles (ESP)	8	11	14	11	11
51	G Alto (ARG)	11	4	12	2	7
48	B Afanador (PUR)	11	9	11	6	4	14	8
50	Lam S H (HKG)	7	11	6	11	11	12	11

=== Bottom half ===
==== Section 3 ====
First round
40	B Tokič (SLO)	11	11	11	11
54	J Hazin (CAN)	7	9	5	7
36	P Drinkhall (GBR)	11	11	11	8	12
52	N Alamian (IRI)	7	1	5	11	10
34	P Sirucek (CZE) DNS
62	D Powell (AUS)
37	K Skachkov (ROC)	11	11	6	11	11	11
64	D Levajac (SRB)	4	13	11	7	5	8

==== Section 4 ====
First round
45	Kou L (UKR)	11	11	11	11
58	A Hmam (TUN)	6	3	7	6
44	H Cifuentes (ARG)	11	11	12	11
63	Y Shing (VAN)	2	5	10	6
39	B Majoros (HUN)	11	11	11	11
61	L Bouriah (ALG)	1	5	5	2
38	T Apolónia (POR)	11	11	11	11
49	O Omotayo (NGR)	7	9	6	5
