= Table tennis at the 2023 Pan American Games – Men's singles =

Men's singles at the 2023 Pan American Games
- Venue: Olympic Training Center
- Dates: 30 October–1 November 2023
- Competitors: 32 from 17 nations

Medalists
Gold medal	Hugo Calderano	Brazil
Silver medal	Andy Pereira	Cuba
Bronze medal	Marcos Madrid	Mexico
Bronze medal	Eugene Wang	Canada

The men's singles competition of the table tennis events at the 2023 Pan American Games was held from 30 October to 2 November 2023 at the Olympic Training Center in Santiago, Chile.

== Schedule ==
Date	Time	Round
30 October 2023	11:40	Round of 32
31 October 2023	10:50	Round of 16
31 October 2023	16:50	Quarterfinals
1 November 2023	12:00	Semifinals
2 November 2023	18:30	Final

== Results ==
The results during the elimination rounds and final rounds were as follows:

=== Finals ===
Final
Hugo Calderano (BRA)	11	11	11	11
Andy Pereira (CUB)	3	8	5	4

=== Top half ===
First Round
Hugo Calderano (BRA)	11	11	11	11
Carlos Fernandez (PER)	5	0	5	5
Heber Moscoso (EAI)	4	5	10	3
Edward Ly (CAN)	11	11	12	11
Gustavo Gómez (CHI)	11	8	11	11	11
Diego Orantes (ESA)	9	11	3	8	7
Alejandro Toranzos (PAR)	13	5	7	12	9	10
Alberto Miño (ECU)	11	11	11	10	11	12
Marcos Madrid (MEX)	11	11	11
Jorge Campos (CUB)	8	4	5	9
Shemar Britton (GUY)	4	8	8	11	3
Daniel Gonzalez (PUR)	11	11	11	6	11
Jishan Liang (USA)	11	11	11	11
Santiago Montes (COL)	5	6	3
Tyrese Knight (BAR)	3	13	11	9	15
Santiago Lorenzo (ARG)	11	15	7	11	17

Second Round
Hugo Calderano (BRA)	11	11	10	11	11
Edward Ly (CAN)	6	2	12	8	8
Gustavo Gómez (CHI)	11	6	11	6	11	11
Alberto Miño (ECU)	8	11	8	11	4	9
Marcos Madrid (MEX)	12	11	11	12	11
Daniel González (PUR)	10	5	6	14	9
Jishan Liang (USA)	6	13	10	8	7
Santiago Lorenzo (ARG)	11	11	12	11	11

Quarterfinals
Hugo Calderano (BRA)	11	11	11	11
Gustavo Gómez (CHI)	9	7	5	6
Marcos Madrid (MEX)	11	11	11	11
Santiago Lorenzo (ARG)	6	7	6	9

Semifinals
Hugo Calderano (BRA)	11	11	11	9	11
Marcos Madrid (MEX)	8	7	8	11	5

=== Bottom half ===
First Round
Brian Afanador (PUR)	11	11	11	11
Héctor Gatica (EAI)	8	7	7	1
César Castillo (VEN)	9	8	10	12	4
Andy Pereira (CUB)	11	11	12	10	11
Marcelo Aguirre (PAR)	11	11	9	8	12	11
Nandan Naresh (USA)	9	7	11	11	10	9
Jiaji Wu (DOM)	11	11	2	6	5	4
Horacio Cifuentes (ARG)	6	9	11	11	11	11
Eugene Wang (CAN)	11	11	11	11
Julián Ramos (COL)	9	4	7	7
Rodrigo Tapia (ECU)	12	8	8	8
Gastón Alto (ARG)	14	11	11	11
Vitor Ishiy (BRA)	8	11	11	11	12	11
Felipe Duffoo (PER)	11	4	13	6	10	2
Rogelio Castro (MEX)	8	4	11	7	7
Nicolás Burgos (CHI)	11	11	8	11	11

Second Round
Brian Afanador (PUR)	5	11	5	12	5
Andy Pereira (CUB)	11	13	11	10	11
Marcelo Aguirre (PAR)	11	11	8	9
Horacio Cifuentes (ARG)	13	13	11	11
Eugene Wang (CAN)	8	12	11	11	11
Gastón Alto (ARG)	11	10	4	7	3
Vitor Ishiy (BRA)	6	11	11	7	5
Nicolás Burgos (CHI)	11	4	13	11	11

Quarterfinals
Andy Pereira (CUB)	11	11	4	2	10	11	11
Horacio Cifuentes (ARG)	9	7	11	11	12	7	7
Eugene Wang (CAN)	7	11	9	12	11	11
Nicolás Burgos (CHI)	11	7	11	10	6	7

Semifinals
Andy Pereira (CUB)	11	11	11	7	12
Eugene Wang (CAN)	8	5	9	11	10
