= WTT Champions Montpellier 2026 =

Table tennis tournament in France

Tournament details
- Dates: 27 October – 1 November
- Edition: 3rd
- Total prize money: US$500,000
- Venue: Sud de France Arena
- Location: Montpellier, France

Champions
- Men's singles: (South Korea) Jang Woojin
- Women's singles: (China) Sun Yingsha

The WTT Champions Montpellier 2026 was a table tennis tournament that took place at the Sud de France Arena, Montpellier, France, from 27 October to 1 November and had a total prize of US$500,000.

== Tournament ==
The WTT Champions Montpellier 2026 was the twenty-second tournament of the 2026 WTT Series and also part of the WTT Champions event.

=== Venue ===
This tournament was held at the Sud de France Arena in Montpellier, France.

=== Point distribution ===
Below was the point distribution table for each phase of the tournament based on the WTT World Ranking for the WTT Champions event.

Event	Winner	Finalist	Semi-finalist	Quarter-finalist	Round of 16	Round of 32
Singles	1000	700	450	300	140	15

=== Prize pool ===
The total prize money was US$500,000 with the distribution of the prize money in accordance with WTT regulations.

Event	Winner	Finalist	Semi-finalist	Quarter-finalist	Round of 16	Round of 32
Singles	$40,000	$20,000	$11,750	$8,500	$6,000	$4,500

== Men's singles ==
=== Seeds ===
1. (Japan) Sora Matsushima (second round)
2. (France) Félix Lebrun (second round)
3. (Japan) Tomokazu Harimoto (first round)
4. (Sweden) Truls Möregårdh (semi-finals)
5. (Chinese Taipei) Lin Yun-ju (second round)
6. (Brazil) Hugo Calderano (semi-finals)
7. (France) Alexis Lebrun (first round)
8. (China) Lin Shidong (quarter-finals)

=== Finals ===
Semi-finals
6	(Brazil) Hugo Calderano	8	11	11	7	12	11	12
(South Korea) Jang Woo-jin	11	8	7	11	14	9	14
4	(Sweden) Truls Möregårdh	5	11	10	11	10	12	6
(Germany) Patrick Franziska	11	9	12	6	12	10	11

Final
(South Korea) Jang Woo-jin	3	11	7	9	11	11	11
(Germany) Patrick Franziska	11	7	11	11	9	8	8

=== Top half ===
==== Section 1 ====
First round
1	(Japan) S Matsushima	11	11	3	10	11
(Germany) D Qiu	8	8	11	12	2
(Slovenia) D Jorgić	9	11	6	11
(Russia) V Sidorenko	11	9	11	13
(China) Xiang P	6	7	11	11	7
(Germany) D Ovtcharov	11	11	5	5	11
(Japan) H Shinozuka	7	10	5
6	(Brazil) H Calderano	11	12	11

Second round
1	(Japan) S Matsushima	10	11	8	6
(Russia) V Sidorenko	12	9	11	11
(Germany) D Ovtcharov	9	9	4
6	(Brazil) H Calderano	11	11	11

Quarter-finals
(Russia) V Sidorenko	11	4	4	11	5	9
6	(Brazil) H Calderano	5	11	11	8	11	11

==== Section 2 ====
First round
3	(Japan) T Harimoto	13	7	6
WC	(France) S Gauzy	15	11	11
(China) Wen RB	11	8	4
WC	(China) Liang JK	13	11	11
(France) F Coton	11	11	9	6	9
(South Korea) Jang W-j	5	9	11	11	11
(Portugal) J Geraldo	11	4	11	4	6
5	(Chinese Taipei) Lin Y-j	8	11	5	11	11

Second round
WC	(France) S Gauzy	11	11	7	10	8
WC	(China) Liang JK	9	9	11	12	11
(South Korea) Jang W-j	9	11	11	9	12
5	(Chinese Taipei) Lin Y-j	11	9	9	11	10

Quarter-finals
WC	(China) Liang JK	6	9	13	10	8
(South Korea) Jang W-j	11	11	8	11	12

=== Bottom half ===
==== Section 3 ====
First round
8	(China) Lin SD	11	11	11
(South Korea) Lim J-h	7	8	2
(South Korea) An J-h	8	7	11	11	13
(Egypt) O Assar	11	11	8	8	11
(Japan) S Togami	11	11	6	11
(Croatia) T Pucar	9	7	11	6
(France) T Poret	8	6	8
4	(Sweden) T Möregårdh	11	11	11

Second round
8	(China) Lin SD	11	11	11
(South Korea) An J-h	7	9	7
(Japan) S Togami	11	9	12	5
4	(Sweden) T Möregårdh	7	11	14	11

Quarter-finals
8	(China) Lin SD	11	8	11	7	11	7	8
4	(Sweden) T Möregårdh	1	11	3	11	5	11	11

==== Section 4 ====
First round
7	(France) A Lebrun	11	11	12	7	9
(Germany) P Franziska	9	4	14	11	11
(Sweden) E Ranefur	7	8	11	12	11
(Sweden) A Källberg	11	11	7	10	8
(South Korea) Oh J-s	11	11	8	5	4
(China) Zhou QH	5	5	11	11	11
(Denmark) A Lind	8	3	3
2	(France) F Lebrun	11	11	11

Second round
(Germany) P Franziska	12	11	8	11
(Sweden) E Ranefur	10	4	11	8
(China) Zhou QH	7	11	11	11
2	(France) F Lebrun	11	9	8	7

Quarter-finals
(Germany) P Franziska	13	11	7	11	11	10	12
(China) Zhou QH	15	5	11	9	9	12	10

== Women's singles ==
=== Seeds ===
1. (China) Wang Manyu (second round)
2. (China) Sun Yingsha (champion)
3. (Japan) Miwa Harimoto (quarter-finals)
4. (China) Wang Yidi (semi-finals)
5. (China) Kuai Man (final)
6. (Japan) Hina Hayata (quarter-finals)
7. (China) Chen Xingtong (quarter-finals)
8. (Japan) Hitomi Sato (quarter-finals)

=== Finals ===
Semi-finals
(China) Chen Yi	11	5	11	6	11	9
5	(China) Kuai Man	13	11	8	11	6	11
4	(China) Wang Yidi	11	9	10	11	11	14	2
2	(China) Sun Yingsha	13	11	12	9	8	12	11

Final
5	(China) Kuai Man	11	7	3	9	6
2	(China) Sun Yingsha	8	11	11	11	11

=== Top half ===
==== Section 1 ====
First round
1	(China) Wang MY	11	11	11
(Egypt) H Goda	9	9	9
(China) Chen Y	10	11	11	11
(Chinese Taipei) Peng Y-h	12	4	3	5
(Germany) S Winter	11	5	11	11
(France) J N Yuan	4	11	4	9
(France) P Pavade	10	6	14	1
8	(Japan) H Sato	12	11	12	11

Second round
1	(China) Wang MY	11	8	9
(China) Chen Y	13	11	11
(Germany) S Winter	8	11	3	7
8	(Japan) H Sato	11	9	11	11

Quarter-finals
(China) Chen Y	12	11	11	11
8	(Japan) H Sato	10	5	6	4

==== Section 2 ====
First round
3	(Japan) M Harimoto	11	11	11
(Brazil) B Takahashi	7	8	4
(United States) L Zhang	11	11	11
(Australia) Y Liu	7	6	6
(South Korea) Joo C-h	8	8	9
(Puerto Rico) A Díaz	11	11	11
(Wales) A Hursey	4	7	11	11	12
5	(China) Kuai M	11	11	8	9	14

Second round
3	(Japan) M Harimoto	16	8	11	9	11
(United States) L Zhang	14	11	4	11	7
(Puerto Rico) A Díaz	4	2	12	12	2
5	(China) Kuai M	11	11	10	10	11

Quarter-finals
3	(Japan) M Harimoto	11	8	2	11	9	6
5	(China) Kuai M	9	11	11	6	11	11

=== Bottom half ===
==== Section 3 ====
First round
7	(China) Chen XT	11	11	11
(Ukraine) M Pesotska	8	7	7
WC	(Germany) A Kaufmann	11	9	11	11	11
(Japan) S Odo	5	11	13	8	7
(Germany) Y Han	8	4	11	7
(Romania) E Samara	11	11	8	11
(Egypt) D Meshref	6	4	6
4	(China) Wang YD	11	11	11

Second round
7	(China) Chen XT	11	8	11	11
WC	(Germany) A Kaufmann	6	11	3	8
(Romania) E Samara	6	6	7
4	(China) Wang YD	11	11	11

Quarter-finals
7	(China) Chen XT	6	11	11	5	4	14	10
4	(China) Wang YD	11	7	7	11	11	12	12

==== Section 4 ====
First round
6	(Japan) H Hayata	11	11	11
(Hong Kong) Doo H K	9	7	9
(South Korea) Kim N-y	7	10	9
(Romania) B Szőcs	11	12	11
(South Korea) Shin Y-b	11	13	11
(Chinese Taipei) Cheng I-c	2	11	5
WC	(France) C Lutz	6	5	3
2	(China) Sun YS	11	11	11

Second round
6	(Japan) H Hayata	11	11	5	11
(Romania) B Szőcs	8	9	11	6
(South Korea) Shin Y-b	9	11	6	11	6
2	(China) Sun YS	11	6	11	8	11

Quarter-finals
6	(Japan) H Hayata	7	9	11	13	8	11	9
2	(China) Sun YS	11	11	9	11	11	9	11

Preceded by China Smash 2026	2026 WTT Series	Succeeded by WTT Champions Frankfurt 2026
