= WTT Champions Frankfurt 2026 =

Table tennis tournament in Germany

Tournament details
- Dates: 3–8 November
- Edition: 4th
- Total prize money: US$500,000
- Venue: Süwag Energie ARENA
- Location: Frankfurt, Germany

Champions
- Men's singles: (Japan) Tomokazu Harimoto
- Women's singles: (Japan) Hina Hayata

The WTT Champions Frankfurt 2026 was a table tennis tournament which took place at the Süwag Energie ARENA, Frankfurt, Germany, from 3 to 8 November and had a total prize of US$500,000.

== Tournament ==
The WTT Champions Frankfurt 2026 was the twenty-third tournament of the 2026 WTT Series and also part of the WTT Champions event.

=== Venue ===
This tournament was held at the Süwag Energie ARENA in Frankfurt, Germany.

=== Point distribution ===
Below was the point distribution table for each phase of the tournament based on the WTT World Ranking for the WTT Champions event.

| Event | Winner | Finalist | Semi-finalist | Quarter-finalist | Round of 16 | Round of 32 |
| Singles | 1000 | 700 | 450 | 300 | 140 | 15 |

=== Prize pool ===
The total prize money was US$500,000 with the distribution of the prize money in accordance with WTT regulations.

| Event | Winner | Finalist | Semi-finalist | Quarter-finalist | Round of 16 | Round of 32 |
| Singles | $40,000 | $20,000 | $11,750 | $8,500 | $6,000 | $4,500 |

== Men's singles ==
=== Seeds ===
1. (Japan) Sora Matsushima (quarter-finals)
2. (Japan) Tomokazu Harimoto (champion)
3. (Sweden) Truls Möregårdh (withdrew)
4. (China) Wang Chuqin (second round)
5. (Chinese Taipei) Lin Yun-ju (semi-finals)
6. (Brazil) Hugo Calderano (second round)
7. (South Korea) Jang Woo-jin (first round)
8. (Germany) Dang Qiu (quarter-finals)

=== Finals ===
Semi-finals
(Germany) Patrick Franziska | 11 | 8 | 11 | 5 | 11 | 11
(Japan) Shunsuke Togami | 7 | 11 | 6 | 11 | 7 | 9
5 | (Chinese Taipei) Lin Yun-ju | 9 | 10 | 11 | 11 | 6 | 11 | 8
2 | (Japan) Tomokazu Harimoto | 11 | 12 | 8 | 7 | 11 | 9 | 11

Final
(Germany) Patrick Franziska | 11 | 9 | 13 | 8 | 4 | 4
2 | (Japan) Tomokazu Harimoto | 2 | 11 | 11 | 11 | 11 | 11

=== Top half ===
==== Section 1 ====
First round
1 | (Japan) S Matsushima | 11 | 11 | 11
(Portugal) J Geraldo | 6 | 8 | 7
(Croatia) T Pucar | 11 | 11 | 11
(France) F Coton | 9 | 9 | 6
(China) Xiang P | 4 | 11 | 11 | 4
(Germany) P Franziska | 11 | 4 | 13 | 11
WC | (Germany) B Duda | 3 | 11 | 11 | 11
7 | (South Korea) Jang W-j | 11 | 3 | 8 | 4

Second round
1 | (Japan) S Matsushima | 11 | 9 | 11 | 11
(Croatia) T Pucar | 6 | 11 | 9 | 5
(Germany) P Franziska | 8 | 13 | 11 | 15 | 12
WC | (Germany) B Duda | 11 | 15 | 7 | 13 | 10

Quarter-finals
1 | (Japan) S Matsushima | 11 | 11 | 8 | 7 | 12 | 10
(Germany) P Franziska | 9 | 13 | 11 | 11 | 10 | 12

==== Section 2 ====
First round
(Sweden) K Karlsson | 5 | 7 | 6
(South Korea) Oh J-s | 11 | 11 | 11
(Japan) S Togami | 11 | 12 | 14
(United States) K Jha | 4 | 10 | 12
WC | (Germany) W Verdonschot | 10 | 11 | 11 | 11
(France) S Gauzy | 12 | 9 | 9 | 7
(China) Liang JK | 11 | 11 | 13 | 11 | 9
6 | (Brazil) H Calderano | 7 | 13 | 15 | 9 | 11

Second round
(South Korea) Oh J-s | 8 | 11 | 5 | 11 | 5
(Japan) S Togami | 11 | 3 | 11 | 4 | 11
WC | (Germany) W Verdonschot | 11 | 11 | 7 | 13
6 | (Brazil) H Calderano | 5 | 9 | 11 | 11

Quarter-finals
(Japan) S Togami | 11 | 5 | 11 | 11 | 7 | 11
WC | (Germany) W Verdonschot | 9 | 11 | 9 | 6 | 11 | 7

=== Bottom half ===
==== Section 3 ====
First round
5 | (Chinese Taipei) Lin Y-j | 6 | 11 | 12 | 11 | 11
(Slovenia) D Jorgić | 11 | 9 | 14 | 3 | 8
(China) Zhou QH | 11 | 11 | 12
(France) T Poret | 5 | 5 | 10
(China) Wen RB | 11 | 11 | 11
(South Korea) An J-h | 5 | 6 | 3
(Denmark) A Lind | 7 | 12 | 9
4 | (China) Wang CQ | 11 | 14 | 11

Second round
5 | (Chinese Taipei) Lin Y-j | 11 | 11 | 8 | 11
(China) Zhou QH | 7 | 9 | 11 | 7
(China) Wen RB | 11 | 11 | 11
4 | (China) Wang CQ | 7 | 8 | 6

Quarter-finals
5 | (Chinese Taipei) Lin Y-j | 12 | 11 | 11 | 11
(China) Wen RB | 10 | 7 | 8 | 5

==== Section 4 ====
First round
8 | (Germany) D Qiu | 3 | 14 | 9 | 11 | 11
(Sweden) E Ranefur | 11 | 12 | 11 | 2 | 7
(Egypt) O Assar | 10 | 11 | 5 | 9
(Germany) D Ovtcharov | 12 | 9 | 11 | 11
(South Korea) Lim J-h | 1 | 10 | 11 | 11 | 11
(Sweden) A Källberg | 11 | 12 | 8 | 8 | 8
(Russia) V Sidorenko | 6 | 8 | 7
2 | (Japan) T Harimoto | 11 | 11 | 11

Second round
8 | (Germany) D Qiu | 11 | 11 | 11
(Germany) D Ovtcharov | 6 | 9 | 9
(South Korea) Lim J-h | 6 | 11 | 4 | 4
2 | (Japan) T Harimoto | 11 | 8 | 11 | 11

Quarter-finals
8 | (Germany) D Qiu | 6 | 13 | 6 | 5
2 | (Japan) T Harimoto | 11 | 15 | 11 | 11

== Women's singles ==
=== Seeds ===
1. (China) Sun Yingsha (withdrew)
2. (Japan) Miwa Harimoto (semi-finals)
3. (China) Wang Yidi (first round)
4. (China) Kuai Man (quarter-finals)
5. (Japan) Hina Hayata (champion)
6. (China) Chen Xingtong (quarter-finals)
7. (Japan) Hitomi Sato (first round)
8. (China) Chen Yi (quarter-finals)

=== Finals ===
Semi-finals
(Japan) Satsuki Odo | 6 | 12 | 11 | 11 | 12
(Germany) Sabine Winter | 11 | 10 | 9 | 8 | 10
5 | (Japan) Hina Hayata | 11 | 5 | 11 | 11 | 11
2 | (Japan) Miwa Harimoto | 7 | 11 | 7 | 8 | 8

Final
(Japan) Satsuki Odo | 10 | 3 | 11 | 5 | 11 | 6
5 | (Japan) Hina Hayata | 12 | 11 | 6 | 11 | 8 | 11

=== Top half ===
==== Section 1 ====
First round
(Poland) N Bajor | 11 | 9 | 11 | 16
(Australia) Y Liu | 8 | 11 | 8 | 14
(Egypt) H Goda | 7 | 11 | 11 | 7 | 11
(France) J N Yuan | 11 | 7 | 5 | 11 | 7
(Chinese Taipei) Peng Y-h | 9 | 8 | 8
(Romania) B Szőcs | 11 | 11 | 11
(Japan) S Odo | 11 | 11 | 11
7 | (Japan) H Sato | 6 | 6 | 6

Second round
(Poland) N Bajor | 11 | 8 | 6 | 11 | 7
(Egypt) H Goda | 9 | 11 | 11 | 7 | 11
(Romania) B Szőcs | 11 | 4 | 4 | 4
(Japan) S Odo | 6 | 11 | 11 | 11

Quarter-finals
(Egypt) H Goda | 12 | 8 | 11 | 9 | 7 | 7
(Japan) S Odo | 10 | 11 | 9 | 11 | 11 | 11

==== Section 2 ====
First round
3 | (China) Wang YD | 8 | 10 | 4
(Germany) Y Han | 11 | 12 | 11
(Germany) S Winter | 11 | 3 | 11 | 11
(Wales) A Hursey | 5 | 11 | 5 | 9
(France) P Pavade | 9 | 7 | 9
(Ukraine) M Pesotska | 11 | 11 | 11
WC | (Germany) J Neumann | 7 | 3 | 5
8 | (China) Chen Y | 11 | 11 | 11

Second round
(Germany) Y Han | 8 | 7 | 3
(Germany) S Winter | 11 | 11 | 11
(Ukraine) M Pesotska | 11 | 4 | 6 | 11 | 2
8 | (China) Chen Y | 3 | 11 | 11 | 6 | 11

Quarter-finals
(Germany) S Winter | 11 | 12 | 11 | 11
8 | (China) Chen Y | 3 | 10 | 7 | 8

=== Bottom half ===
==== Section 3 ====
First round
5 | (Japan) H Hayata | 11 | 12 | 11
(United States) L Zhang | 5 | 10 | 4
(Germany) A Kaufmann | 11 | 9 | 14 | 11
(Hong Kong) Doo H K | 1 | 11 | 12 | 9
(Romania) E Samara | 8 | 9 | 5
(Germany) N Mittelham | 11 | 11 | 11
(United States) A Wang | 8 | 2 | 3
4 | (China) Kuai M | 11 | 11 | 11

Second round
5 | (Japan) H Hayata | 11 | 7 | 11 | 11
(Germany) A Kaufmann | 7 | 11 | 8 | 5
(Germany) N Mittelham | 4 | 5 | 2
4 | (China) Kuai M | 11 | 11 | 11

Quarter-finals
5 | (Japan) H Hayata | 11 | 11 | 6 | 11 | 11 | 13 | 11
4 | (China) Kuai M | 13 | 7 | 11 | 7 | 3 | 15 | 7

==== Section 4 ====
First round
6 | (China) Chen XT | 11 | 11 | 11
(South Korea) Kim N-y | 1 | 6 | 7
(Chinese Taipei) Cheng I-c | 11 | 10 | 9 | 7
(Brazil) B Takahashi | 7 | 12 | 11 | 11
(Puerto Rico) A Díaz | 8 | 8 | 11 | 3
(South Korea) Joo C-h | 11 | 11 | 2 | 11
WC | (Austria) S Polcanova | 13 | 8 | 9 | 11 | 7
2 | (Japan) M Harimoto | 11 | 11 | 11 | 7 | 11

Second round
6 | (China) Chen XT | 11 | 11 | 11
(Brazil) B Takahashi | 5 | 4 | 3
(South Korea) Joo C-h | 11 | 3 | 7 | 5
2 | (Japan) M Harimoto | 6 | 11 | 11 | 11

Quarter-finals
6 | (China) Chen XT | 10 | 5 | 11 | 11 | 13 | 7
2 | (Japan) M Harimoto | 12 | 11 | 6 | 13 | 11 | 11

| Preceded by WTT Champions Montpellier 2026 | 2026 WTT Series | Succeeded by WTT Contender Istanbul 2026 |
