= 2021 WTT Cup Finals =

Table tennis tournament in Singapore

WTT Cup Finals Singapore
Tournament details
- Dates: 4–7 December
- Edition: 1st
- Total prize money: US$600,000
- Venue: Singapore Sports Hub
- Location: Singapore

Champions
- Men's singles: (China) Fan Zhendong
- Women's singles: (China) Sun Yingsha

The 2021 WTT Cup Finals (officially was the WTT Cup Finals Singapore 2021) is a table tennis year-end tournament. It has been held from 4 to 7 December 2021 in Singapore and features a total prize pool of $600,000. This is the first tournament since the ITTF World Tour Grand Finals, which was held until 2019, was replaced by the WTT finals.

Fan Zhendong defeated Tomokazu Harimoto in the men's singles to win his third title in the season-ending tournament, his first since the 2019 ITTF World Tour Grand Finals. Sun Yingsha defeated Wang Yidi in the women's singles to win her first title in the season-ending tournament.

== Tournament ==
=== Venue ===
This tournament was held at the Singapore Sports Hub in Singapore.

=== Point distribution ===
Below is the point distribution table for each phase of the tournament for the WTT Cup Finals.

Winner(s)	Finalist	Semi-finalists	Quarter-finalist	Round of 16
1,500	1,050	525	265	100

=== Prize pool ===
The total prize money is US$600,000 with the distribution of the prize money in accordance with WTT regulations.

Winner(s)	Finalist	Semi-finalists	Quarter-finalist	Round of 16
$45,000	$35,000	$26,000	$18,000	$12,000

== Qualification ==
The tournament will feature 16 of the world's best Men's and Women's Singles players based on the International Table Tennis Federation (ITTF) World Rankings, published on 16 November 2021.

== Men's singles ==
=== Seeds ===
1. (China) Fan Zhendong (champion)
2. (Brazil) Hugo Calderano (semi-finals)
3. (Japan) Tomokazu Harimoto (final)
4. (Chinese Taipei) Lin Yun-ju (round of 16)

=== Draw ===
Round of 16
1	(China) Fan ZD	14	11	11
(Germany) P Franziska	12	7	9
(South Korea) Jeoung Y-s	11	5	11	11
(South Korea) Lee S-s	3	11	6	5
4	(Chinese Taipei) Lin Y-j	5	8	7
(China) Wang CQ	11	11	11
(England) L Pitchford	12	8	13	11	11
(South Korea) Jang W-j	10	11	15	8	6
(France) S Gauzy	7	11	8	8
(Hong Kong) Wong C T	11	7	11	11
(Sweden) M Falck	6	8	8
3	(Japan) T Harimoto	11	11	11
(China) Liang JK	11	1	12	5
(Nigeria) Q Aruna	7	11	14	11
(China) Lin GY	8	9	11
2	(Brazil) H Calderano	11	11	13

Quarterfinals
1	(China) Fan ZD	11	16	11
(South Korea) Jeoung Y-s	6	14	6
(China) Wang CQ	11	11	12
(England) L Pitchford	8	6	10
(Hong Kong) Wong C T	4	11	6	11
3	(Japan) T Harimoto	11	7	11	13
(Nigeria) Q Aruna	6	11	8	4
2	(Brazil) H Calderano	11	6	11	11

Semifinals
1	(China) Fan ZD	9	11	12	6	11	11
(China) Wang CQ	11	9	10	11	7	9
3	(Japan) T Harimoto	11	11	14	11	11
2	(Brazil) H Calderano	6	9	16	5	3

Final
1	(China) Fan ZD	11	9	11	11	11
3	(Japan) T Harimoto	8	11	9	7	5

== Women's singles ==
=== Seeds ===
1. (China) Chen Meng (semi-finals)
2. (China) Sun Yingsha (champion)
3. (China) Wang Manyu (round of 16)
4. (China) Wang Yidi (final)

=== Draw ===
Round of 16
1	(China) Chen M	11	9	11	12
(Japan) K Ishikawa	8	11	5	10
(Singapore) Feng TW	11	11	8	11
(South Korea) Jeon J-h	6	8	11	5
4	(China) Wang YD	13	11	5	11
(Puerto Rico) A Diaz	11	3	11	9
(Japan) H Sato	11	12	13	11
(Austria) S Polcanova	13	10	11	9
(Japan) H Hayata	11	11	14	14
(Chinese Taipei) Cheng I-c	6	13	12	12
(Hong Kong) Doo H K	11	11	11
3	(China) Wang MY	7	6	7
(Japan) M Hirano	6	8	8
(China) Chen XT	11	11	11
(Germany) P Solja	4	5	7
2	(China) Sun YS	11	11	11

Quarterfinals
1	(China) Chen M	11	11	11
(Singapore) Feng TW	6	5	7
4	(China) Wang YD	9	11	11	11
(Japan) H Sato	11	7	9	8
(Japan) H Hayata	11	11	6	11
(Hong Kong) Doo H K	1	5	11	8
(China) Chen XT	5	9	7
2	(China) Sun YS	11	11	11

Semifinals
1	(China) Chen M	8	11	14	4	11	8	10
4	(China) Wang YD	11	8	12	11	5	11	12
(Japan) H Hayata	11	9	6	9	8
2	(China) Sun YS	6	11	11	11	11

Final
4	(China) Wang YD	3	15	6	11	11	8
2	(China) Sun YS	11	17	11	7	6	11
