= Eugene Wang =

Canadian table tennis player

Personal information
- Full name: Eugene Zhen Wang
- Nickname: 唐僧
- Nationality: Canada
- Born: November 13, 1985 (age 40) Shijiazhuang, Hebei, China
- Height: 1.74 m (5 ft 9 in)
- Weight: 80 kg (176 lb)

Sport
- Sport: Table tennis
- Club: True North TTC; Carolina Gold Rush
- Playing style: Right-handed
- Current ranking: 108 (2 November 2026)
Medal record
Men's table tennis
Representing Canada
Pan American Games
Gold medal – first place	2019 Lima	Mixed doubles
Silver medal – second place	2023 Santiago	Team
Bronze medal – third place	2015 Toronto	Singles
Bronze medal – third place	2015 Toronto	Team
Bronze medal – third place	2019 Lima	Singles
Bronze medal – third place	2023 Santiago	Mixed doubles
Bronze medal – third place	2023 Santiago	Singles

Eugene Wang (born Wang Zhen 王臻 on November 13, 1985) is a Canadian table tennis player. He was given permission to compete for Canada in June 2012, allowing him to represent Canada at the 2012 Summer Olympics in the men's team event. He trains in Saarbrücken, Germany.

In June 2016, he was officially named to Canada's 2016 Olympic team.

Wang competed in the 2019 Butterfly Canadian National Championships in both Men's Singles & Men's Doubles, pairing with 2018 Champion Jeremy Hazin. Wang & Hazin won the doubles event, defeating the Québec duo of Antoine Bernadet & Marko Medjugorac in the Finals. Wang would go on to face both men again in the singles bracket, felling Medjugorac in the semi-finals and Bernadet in the Finals. Wang's victory over Bernadet was a sweep (11-3 11-4 11-8 11-5).

He represented Canada at the 2020 Summer Olympics.

He plays professionally for the Carolina Gold Rush of Major League Table Tennis.
