= Jeremy Hazin =

Canadian table tennis player

Jeremy Hazin OLY
Personal information
- Born: February 27, 2000 (age 26) Richmond Hill, Ontario
- Height: 173 cm (5 ft 8 in)
- Weight: 74 kg (163 lb)
Medal record
Men's Table tennis
Representing Canada
Pan American Table Tennis Championships
Bronze medal – third place	2019 Asunción	Men's team
Junior Pan American Games
Bronze medal – third place	2021 Cali–Valle	Men's individual
Bronze medal – third place	2021 Cali–Valle	Mixed doubles

Jeremy Hazin OLY (born February 27, 2000) is a Canadian table tennis player.

== Career ==
Hazin became the youngest Canadian player to compete at a senior World Table Tennis Championships, at the age of 13.

Hazin competed at the 2019 Pan American Games in Lima, Peru, finishing in the round of 16 in the singles, quarterfinals in the men's doubles and quarterfinals in the men's team event.

In May 2021, Hazin was named to Canada's 2020 Olympic team. In March 2024, Hazin earned the last spot on Canada's men's team for the 2024 Summer Olympics.
