= Brian Afanador =

Puerto Rican table tennis player

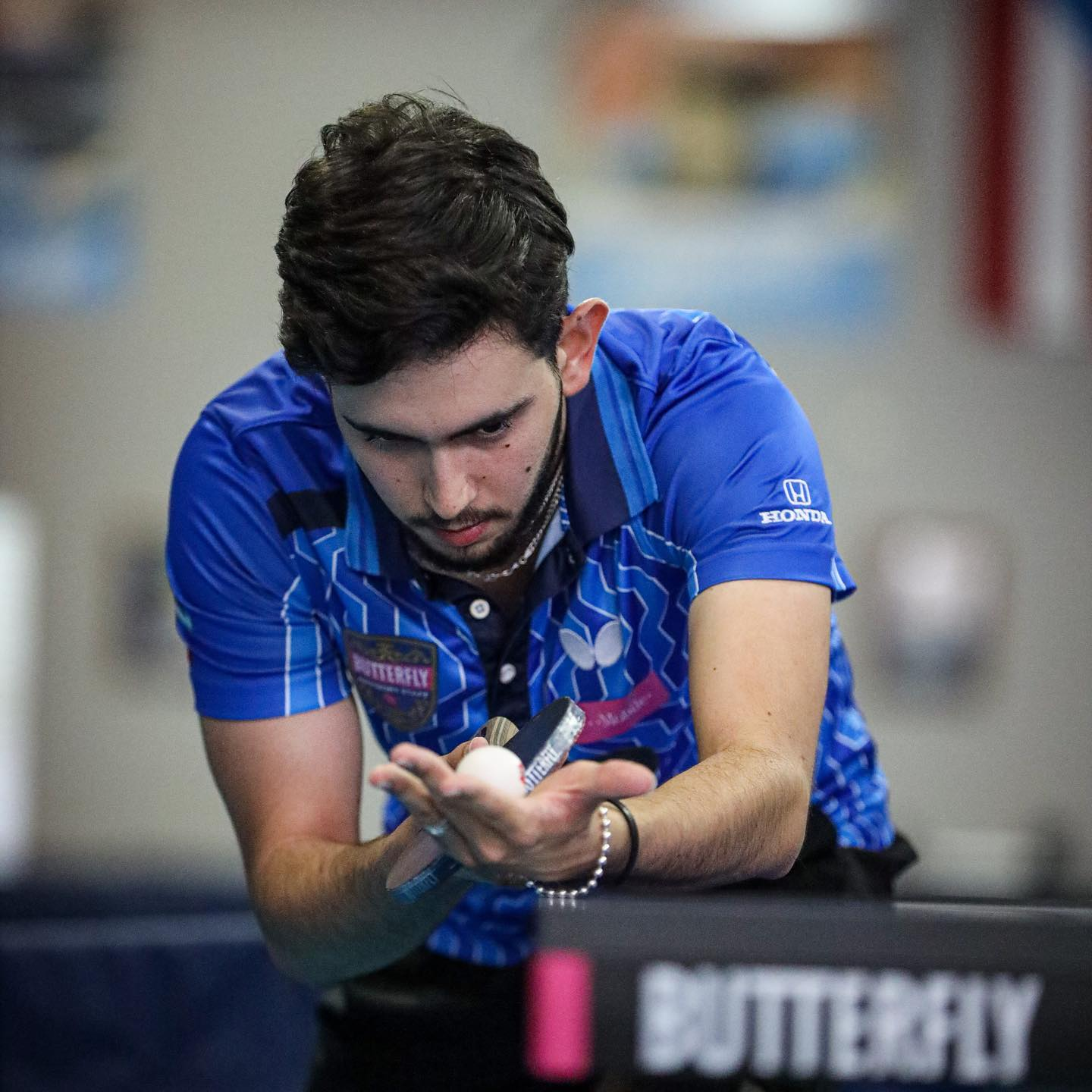

Personal information
- Full name: Brian O'Neill Afanador Pérez
- Nationality: Puerto Rico
- Born: March 6, 1997 (age 29) Utuado, Puerto Rico
- Height: 5 ft 9 in (175 cm)
- Weight: 140 lb (64 kg)

Sport
- Sport: Table tennis
- Club: Alliance Montpellier - Nimes
- Equipment: Butterfly
- Highest ranking: Senior: 67 (January 2022); U21: 25 (March 2018); U18: 13 (August 2015); U15: 17 (May 2012)
- Current ranking: 67 (January 2022)
Medal record
Men's table tennis
Representing Puerto Rico
Pan American Games
Bronze medal – third place	2019 Lima	Doubles
Bronze medal – third place	2019 Lima	Mixed doubles
Bronze medal – third place	2015 Toronto	Team
Central American and Caribbean Games
Gold medal – first place	2014 Veracruz	Mixed doubles
Gold medal – first place	2014 Veracruz	Team
Gold medal – first place	2018 Barranquilla	Mixed doubles
Silver medal – second place	2014 Veracruz	Singles
Silver medal – second place	2014 Veracruz	Doubles
Silver medal – second place	2018 Barranquilla	Team
Bronze medal – third place	2018 Barranquilla	Singles
Bronze medal – third place	2018 Barranquilla	Doubles
Latin American Championships
Gold medal – first place	2016 San Juan	Singles U21
Silver medal – second place	2016 San Juan	Doubles
Bronze medal – third place	2016 San Juan	Mixed doubles

Brian O'Neill Afanador Pérez (born March 6, 1997) is a Puerto Rican table tennis player.

On April 2, 2016, Afanador made history becoming the first Puerto Rican male table tennis player to qualify for the Olympic Games. On June 3, 2016, Afanador upset number 10 seeded and number 44 in the International Table Tennis Federation world ranking Bojan Tokič at the 2016 ITTF Slovenia Open in Otočec, Slovenia. He competed at the 2016 Summer Olympics where he defeated Suraju Saka 4–3 in the preliminary round before losing to Omar Assar 4–2 in the second round.

== Clubs ==
- (Germany) TTC indeland Jülich (2017–2018)
- (France) 4S Tours TT (2018–present)

== Personal life ==
Afanador was born on March 6, 1997, and has one younger brother. He is the cousin of the table tennis Díaz sisters, Adriana, Melanie, Fabiola, and Gabriela.

On August 23, 2020, Afanador announced he and his partner Noralis Soé Ruiz Lugo, a public relations professional, were expecting their first child together. On September 25, they announced they were expecting a girl who was born on December 20, 2020, and named Antonella Isabelle. Afanador and Ruiz married in February 2023. They currently reside in Montpellier, France.

== Achievements ==
- 2020-2021 Olympic Games
- 2019 Pan American Games – Bronze Medal - Mixed Double
- 2019 Pan American Games – Bronze Medal - Double
- 2018 Central American and Caribbean Games – Gold Medal - Mixed Double
- 2018 Central American and Caribbean Games – Silver Medal - Team
- 2018 Central American and Caribbean Games – Bronze Medal - Individual
- 2018 Central American and Caribbean Games – Bronze Medal - Double
- 2016 Olympic Games
- 2016 Latin American Champion
- 2015 Pan American Games – Bronze Medal - Team
- 2015 US Open (tennis) – Junior Boys Champion
- 2014 Central American and Caribbean Games – Gold Medal - Mixed Double
- 2014 Central American and Caribbean Games – Gold Medal - Team
- 2014 Central American and Caribbean Games – Silver Medal - Individual
- 2014 Central American and Caribbean Games – Silver Medal - Double
- 2014 Youth Olympic Games Qualifier
- 2014 Puerto Rico World Team Member
- 2014 2013 Latin American Junior and Cadet Champion
- 2012 Puerto Rico National Champion
- 2010 Central American and Caribbean Games – Bronze Medal - Double

Olympic Games
Preceded by Charles Flaherty	Flagbearer for Puerto Rico with Adriana Díaz; Tokyo 2020	Succeeded by William Flaherty
