= Marcos Madrid =

Mexican table tennis player (born 1986)

Personal information
- Full name: Marcos Madrid Mantilla
- Born: 6 September 1986 (age 40) Puebla, Puebla, Mexico

Sport
- Sport: Table tennis
- Current ranking: 245 (28 September 2026)
Medal record
Men's table tennis
Representing Mexico
Pan American Championship
Bronze medal – third place	2025 Rock Hill	Doubles
Bronze medal – third place	2025 Rock Hill	Mixed doubles
Bronze medal – third place	2025 Rock Hill	Team
Pan American Games
Bronze medal – third place	2011 Guadalajara	Team
Bronze medal – third place	2023 Santiago	Singles

Marcos Madrid Mantilla (born 6 September 1986) is a Mexican table tennis player. He competed at the 2016 Summer Olympics in the men's singles event, in which he was eliminated in the first round by Wang Yang.

== Major League Table Tennis ==
In 2023, Madrid joined the Los Angeles Spinners for the inaugural season of Major League Table Tennis (MLTT). During the 2023–24 season, he served as a primary player for the team, which finished fourth in the West Division with a 7–15 record.

Madrid remained with the Spinners for the 2024–25 season. During this period, he became noted for his performance in the "Golden Game," a unique MLTT tie-breaker format, with coach Romain Lorentz citing his development as a specialized performer in high-leverage situations. In Week 7 of the 2025–26 season, he was featured by the league for his individual match performances.

As of the 2025–26 season, Madrid continues to compete for the Spinners while maintaining his international career representing Mexico in ITTF and WTT events.
