= Alberto Miño =

Ecuadorian table tennis player (born 1990)

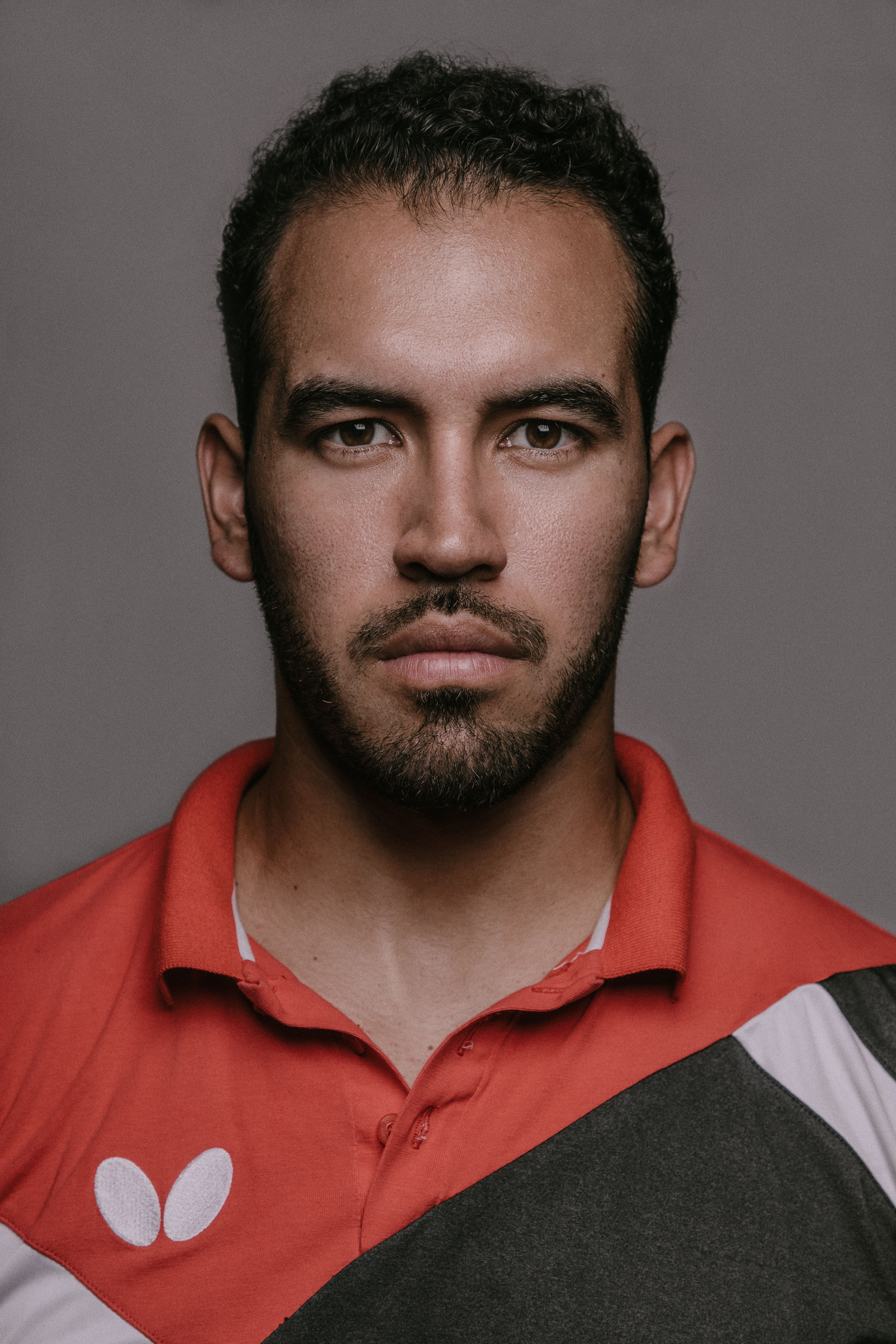

Personal information
- Full name: Jorge Alberto Miño Puga
- Born: 21 August 1990 (age 35) Guayaquil, Ecuador

Sport
- Country: Ecuador
- Sport: Table tennis
- Highest ranking: 66 (1 August 2024)
- Current ranking: 95 (15 July 2025)

Jorge Alberto Miño Puga (Note: In this Spanish name, the first or paternal surname is Miño and the second or maternal family name is Puga.) (born 21 August 1990) is an Ecuadorian table tennis player. He competed in the 2020 Summer Olympics.
