= Table tennis at the 2015 African Games – Mixed doubles =

Mixed Doubles at Table tennis at the 2015 All-Africa Games
- Location: Republic of the Congo; Brazzaville
- Dates: 10–19 September

Medalists
gold medal	(Republic of the Congo) Jianan Wang (Republic of the Congo) Yuheng Li
silver medal	(Nigeria) Olufunke Oshonaike (Nigeria) Ojo Onaolapo
bronze medal	(Egypt) Omar Assar (Egypt) Dina Meshref (Egypt) Ahmed Saleh (Egypt) Farah Abdel-Aziz

The Mixed Doubles Table tennis at the 2015 African Games was held from September 10–19, 2015 at several venues.

== Draw ==
=== Key ===
- Q = Qualifier
- w/o = Walkover
- w/d = Withdraw
- r = Retired
- DQ = Disqualified

=== Finals ===
Quarterfinals
(Egypt) Omar Assar (Egypt) Dina Meshref	11	8	11	4	11
(Republic of the Congo) Bin Hu (Republic of the Congo) Han Xing	6	11	9	11	5
(Egypt) El-sayed Lashin (Egypt) Yousra Helmy	6	5	9
(Republic of the Congo) Jianan Wang (Republic of the Congo) Yuheng Li	11	11	11
(Nigeria) Quadri Aruna (Nigeria) Cecilia Offiong	10	10	11	9
(Egypt) Ahmed Saleh (Egypt) Farah Abdel-Aziz	12	12	5	11
(Nigeria) Ojo Onaolapo (Nigeria) Olufunke Oshonaike	9	11	11	3	11
(Egypt) Mohamed El-Beiali (Egypt) Nadeen El-Dawlatly	11	8	7	11	8

Semifinals
(Egypt) Omar Assar (Egypt) Dina Meshref	9	14	11
(Republic of the Congo) Jianan Wang (Republic of the Congo) Yuheng Li	11	16	13
(Egypt) Ahmed Saleh (Egypt) Farah Abdel-Aziz	8	11	5	3
(Nigeria) Ojo Onaolapo (Nigeria) Olufunke Oshonaike	11	6	11	11

Finals
(Republic of the Congo) Jianan Wang (Republic of the Congo) Yuheng Li	11	11	14
(Nigeria) Ojo Onaolapo (Nigeria) Olufunke Oshonaike	2	6	12

=== Section 1 ===
First round
(Egypt) Omar Assar (Egypt) Dina Meshref
Bye
(Nigeria) Bode Abiodun (Nigeria) Rashidat Ogundele	11	11	11
(Mauritius) Miguel Ingil (Mauritius) Pratna Jalim	3	7	8
(Ghana) Felix Lartey (Ghana) Linda Annor
Bye
Bye
(Tunisia) Adem Hmam (Tunisia) Safa Saïdani
(Algeria) Idir Khourta (Algeria) Sannah Lagsir
Bye
(Republic of the Congo) Jonathan Bizaku (Republic of the Congo) Dacha Mongondi	9	11	11	11
(Sierra Leone) Ibrahim Kamara (Sierra Leone) Stella Grant	11	3	5	8
(Angola) Alessio Antonio (Angola) Ruth Tavares	11	11	11
(Kenya) Josiah Wandera (Kenya) Everlyn Noah	3	6	6
Bye
(Republic of the Congo) Bin Hu (Republic of the Congo) Han Xing

Second round
(Egypt) Omar Assar (Egypt) Dina Meshref	11	11	11
(Nigeria) Bode Abiodun (Nigeria) Rashidat Ogundele	5	7	4
(Ghana) Felix Lartey (Ghana) Linda Annor	6	11	5	5
(Tunisia) Adem Hmam (Tunisia) Safa Saïdani	11	5	11	11
(Algeria) Idir Khourta (Algeria) Sannah Lagsir	11	11	11
(Republic of the Congo) Jonathan Bizaku (Republic of the Congo) Dacha Mongondi	7	7	5
(Angola) Alessio Antonio (Angola) Ruth Tavares	2	3	1
(Republic of the Congo) Bin Hu (Republic of the Congo) Han Xing	11	11	11

Third round
(Egypt) Omar Assar (Egypt) Dina Meshref	11	11	11
(Tunisia) Adem Hmam (Tunisia) Safa Saïdani	3	8	4
(Algeria) Idir Khourta (Algeria) Sannah Lagsir	4	9	8
(Republic of the Congo) Bin Hu (Republic of the Congo) Han Xing	11	11	11

Fourth round
(Egypt) Omar Assar (Egypt) Dina Meshref	11	8	11	4	11
(Republic of the Congo) Bin Hu (Republic of the Congo) Han Xing	6	11	9	11	5

=== Section 2 ===
First Round
(Egypt) El-sayed Lashin (Egypt) Yousra Helmy
Bye
(Kenya) Anthony Ringui (Kenya) Della Mgenya Njani	4	8	8
(Mauritius) Jason Pontoise (Mauritius) Isabelle Chowree	11	11	11
(Namibia) Wayne Marlon Green (Namibia) Bregida George	7	6	4
(Republic of the Congo) Christian Ntumba Ngeleka (Republic of the Congo) Cynthia Nzangani	11	11	11
Bye
(Ethiopia) Meshesha Frezer (Ethiopia) Meron Mekuria
(Algeria) Larbi Bouriah (Algeria) Islem Laid
Bye
(Republic of the Congo) Jianan Wang (Republic of the Congo) Yuheng Li	11	11	11
(Botswana) Bonolo Mabote (Botswana) Magdeline Tshepiso Rebatenne	2	4	8
(Ghana) Emmanuel Commey (Ghana) Bernice Borquaye	11	11	11
(Djibouti) Abdourazack Farah (Djibouti) Safa Farah	2	9	6
Bye
(Nigeria) Segun Toriola (Nigeria) Offiong Edem

Second Round
(Egypt) El-sayed Lashin (Egypt) Yousra Helmy	11	11	11
(Mauritius) Jason Pontoise (Mauritius) Isabelle Chowree	7	6	4
(Republic of the Congo) Christian Ntumba Ngeleka (Republic of the Congo) Cynthia Nzangani	11	11	11
(Ethiopia) Meshesha Frezer (Ethiopia) Meron Mekuria	4	8	8
(Algeria) Larbi Bouriah (Algeria) Islem Laid	6	6	9
(Republic of the Congo) Jianan Wang (Republic of the Congo) Yuheng Li	11	11	11
(Ghana) Emmanuel Commey (Ghana) Bernice Borquaye	2	3	5
(Nigeria) Segun Toriola (Nigeria) Offiong Edem	11	11	11

Third Round
(Egypt) El-sayed Lashin (Egypt) Yousra Helmy	12	11	11
(Republic of the Congo) Christian Ntumba Ngeleka (Republic of the Congo) Cynthia Nzangani	10	4	6
(Republic of the Congo) Jianan Wang (Republic of the Congo) Yuheng Li	11	11	11
(Nigeria) Segun Toriola (Nigeria) Offiong Edem	5	3	4

Fourth Round
(Egypt) El-sayed Lashin (Egypt) Yousra Helmy	6	5	9
(Republic of the Congo) Jianan Wang (Republic of the Congo) Yuheng Li	11	11	11

=== Section 3 ===
First Round
(Nigeria) Quadri Aruna (Nigeria) Cecilia Offiong
Bye
(Botswana) Thobo Matlhatsi (Botswana) Boitshwarelo Butale	10	6	10
(Angola) Elizandro Andre (Angola) Isabel Albino	12	11	12
(Kenya) Peter Muturi (Kenya) Sejal Thakkar
Bye
Bye
(Ghana) Derek Abrefa (Ghana) Efua Oforiwah Owusu-Agyei
(Republic of the Congo) Suraju Saka (Republic of the Congo) Saprina Mazombo
Bye
(Djibouti) Mohamed Abdoulkader (Djibouti) Oumalkaire Atteyeh	6	3	3
(Democratic Republic of the Congo) Gedeon Kassag (Democratic Republic of the Congo) Amandine Litobaka	11	11	11
(Uganda) Ronald Nyaika (Uganda) Amina Lukaaya	5	1	4
(Algeria) Sami Kherouf (Algeria) Katia Kessaci	11	11	11
Bye
(Egypt) Ahmed Saleh (Egypt) Farah Abdel-Aziz

Second Round
(Nigeria) Quadri Aruna (Nigeria) Cecilia Offiong	11	13	11
(Angola) Elizandro Andre (Angola) Isabel Albino	6	11	6
(Kenya) Peter Muturi (Kenya) Sejal Thakkar	9	11	3	10
(Ghana) Derek Abrefa (Ghana) Efua Oforiwah Owusu-Agyei	11	9	11	12
(Republic of the Congo) Suraju Saka (Republic of the Congo) Saprina Mazombo	6	2	3
(Democratic Republic of the Congo) Gedeon Kassag (Democratic Republic of the Congo) Amandine Litobaka	11	11	11
(Algeria) Sami Kherouf (Algeria) Katia Kessaci	12	8	11	3
(Egypt) Ahmed Saleh (Egypt) Farah Abdel-Aziz	14	11	8	11

Third Round
(Nigeria) Quadri Aruna (Nigeria) Cecilia Offiong	11	11	12
(Ghana) Derek Abrefa (Ghana) Efua Oforiwah Owusu-Agyei	7	7	2
(Democratic Republic of the Congo) Gedeon Kassag (Democratic Republic of the Congo) Amandine Litobaka	7	11	4	4
(Egypt) Ahmed Saleh (Egypt) Farah Abdel-Aziz	11	5	11	11

Fourth Round
(Nigeria) Quadri Aruna (Nigeria) Cecilia Offiong	10	10	11	9
(Egypt) Ahmed Saleh (Egypt) Farah Abdel-Aziz	12	12	5	11

=== Section 4 ===
First Round
(Nigeria) Ojo Onaolapo (Nigeria) Olufunke Oshonaike
Bye
(Ghana) Bernard Sam (Ghana) Beatrice Gyasi	13	11	11
(Djibouti) Ahmed Jamal (Djibouti) Rahma Houssein	11	9	6
(Mauritius) Allan Arnachellum (Mauritius) Widaad Gukhool	11	11	11
(Democratic Republic of the Congo) Beni Lukatikisu (Democratic Republic of the Congo) Ruth Mkunda	6	7	3
Bye
(Algeria) Mohamed Sofiene Boudjadja (Algeria) Lynda Loghraibi
(Republic of the Congo) Saheed Idowu (Republic of the Congo) Onyinyechi Nwachukwu
Bye
Bye
(Ethiopia) Aden Faris (Ethiopia) Marta Gulti
(Kenya) Kazia Ali Khan (Kenya) Bahati Rufina	5	9	9
(Seychelles) Mick Crea (Seychelles) Anniesa Benstrong	11	11	11
Bye
(Egypt) Mohamed El-Beiali (Egypt) Nadeen El-Dawlatly

Second Round
(Nigeria) Ojo Onaolapo (Nigeria) Olufunke Oshonaike	11	11	11
(Ghana) Bernard Sam (Ghana) Beatrice Gyasi	3	1	4
(Mauritius) Allan Arnachellum (Mauritius) Widaad Gukhool	6	6	8
(Algeria) Mohamed Sofiene Boudjadja (Algeria) Lynda Loghraibi	11	11	11
(Republic of the Congo) Saheed Idowu (Republic of the Congo) Onyinyechi Nwachukwu	11	11	11
(Ethiopia) Aden Faris (Ethiopia) Marta Gulti	4	6	4
(Seychelles) Mick Crea (Seychelles) Anniesa Benstrong	7	1	11	6
(Egypt) Mohamed El-Beiali (Egypt) Nadeen El-Dawlatly	11	11	7	11

Third Round
(Nigeria) Ojo Onaolapo (Nigeria) Olufunke Oshonaike	11	11	8	11
(Algeria) Mohamed Sofiene Boudjadja (Algeria) Lynda Loghraibi	6	8	11	9
(Republic of the Congo) Saheed Idowu (Republic of the Congo) Onyinyechi Nwachukwu	11	2	9	6
(Egypt) Mohamed El-Beiali (Egypt) Nadeen El-Dawlatly	9	11	11	11

Fourth Round
(Nigeria) Ojo Onaolapo (Nigeria) Olufunke Oshonaike	9	11	11	3	11
(Egypt) Mohamed El-Beiali (Egypt) Nadeen El-Dawlatly	11	8	7	11	8
