= 2015 World Table Tennis Championships – Mixed doubles =

Mixed Doubles at the 2015 World Table Tennis Championships
- Venue: Suzhou International Expo Center
- Location: Suzhou, China
- Dates: 26 April–1 May
- Final score: 11–7, 11–8, 11–4, 11–6

Medalists
Xu Xin; Yang Ha-eun	China; South Korea
Maharu Yoshimura; Kasumi Ishikawa	Japan
Kim Hyok-bong; Kim Jong	North Korea
Wong Chun Ting; Doo Hoi Kem	Hong Kong

The 2015 World Table Tennis Championships mixed doubles was the 53rd edition of the mixed doubles championship.

Kim Hyok-bong and Kim Jong were the defending champions but lost in the semifinals and secured a bronze medal.

Xu Xin and Yang Ha-eun won the gold medal in the final against Maharu Yoshimura and Kasumi Ishikawa by a score of 11–7, 11–8, 11–4, 11–6.

== Seeds ==
Matches were best of 7 games in qualification and in the 128-player sized main draw.

1. (North Korea) Kim Hyok-bong / (North Korea) Kim Jong (semifinals)
2. (Hong Kong) Jiang Tianyi / (Hong Kong) Lee Ho Ching (fourth round)
3. (South Korea) Lee Sang-su / (South Korea) Park Young-sook (fourth round)
4. (Japan) Koki Niwa / (Japan) Sayaka Hirano (fourth round)
5. (China) Xu Xin / (South Korea) Yang Ha-eun (champions)
6. (Egypt) Omar Assar / (Egypt) Dina Meshref (first round)
7. (Chinese Taipei) Chen Chien-an / (Chinese Taipei) Chen Szu-yu (fourth round)
8. (Singapore) Yang Zi / (Singapore) Yu Mengyu (third round)
9. (Chinese Taipei) Chuang Chih-yuan / (Chinese Taipei) Cheng I-ching (second round)
10. (Hong Kong) Wong Chun Ting / (Hong Kong) Doo Hoi Kem (semifinals)
11. (France) Emmanuel Lebesson / (China) Chen Meng (third round)
12. (Poland) Wang Zengyi / (Poland) Natalia Partyka (second round)
13. (Mexico) Marcos Madrid / (Mexico) Yadira Silva (third round)
14. (Germany) Steffen Mengel / (Germany) Petrissa Solja (quarterfinals)
15. (Poland) Paweł Fertikowski / (Poland) Katarzyna Grzybowska (quarterfinals)
16. (Republic of the Congo) Suraju Saka / (Republic of the Congo) Han Xing (second round)
17. (China) Yan An / (China) Wu Yang (quarterfinals)
18. (Australia) Kane Townsend / (Puerto Rico) Adriana Diaz (second round)
19. (Austria) Robert Gardos / (Austria) Liu Jia (second round)
20. (Japan) Maharu Yoshimura / (Japan) Kasumi Ishikawa (final)
21. (Nigeria) Quadri Aruna / (Nigeria) Offiong Edem (first round)
22. (Sweden) Mattias Karlsson / (Sweden) Matilda Ekholm (third round)
23. (Russia) Alexey Liventsov / (Russia) Yulia Prokhorova (fourth round)
24. (Australia) David Powell / (Australia) Lay Jian Fang (second round)
25. (Egypt) Mohamed El-Beiali / (Egypt) Nadeen El-Dawlatly (second round)
26. (Czech Republic) Lubomír Jančařík / (Czech Republic) Iveta Vacenovská (third round)
27. (Spain) He Zhi Wen / (Spain) Sara Ramírez (third round)
28. (Russia) Grigory Vlasov / (Russia) Yana Noskova (third round)
29. (Argentina) Gaston Alto / (Argentina) Camila Arguelles (first round)
30. (Spain) Carlos Machado / (Spain) Shen Yanfei (third round)
31. (Brazil) Gustavo Tsuboi / (Brazil) Gui Lin (second round)
32. (North Korea) Pak Sin-hyok / (North Korea) Kim Hye-song (quarterfinals)
33. (France) Simon Gauzy / (France) Carole Grundisch (second round)
34. (Turkey) Gençay Menge / (Turkey) Melek Hu (third round)
35. (Venezuela) Luis Diaz / (Venezuela) Gremlis Arvelo (first round)
36. (Romania) Ovidiu Ionescu / (Romania) Bernadette Szőcs (third round)
37. (Thailand) Padasak Tanviriyavechakul / (Thailand) Suthasini Sawettabut (second round)
38. (Slovakia) Ľubomír Pištej / (Slovakia) Barbora Balážová (fourth round)
39. (Argentina) Rodrigo Gilabert / (Argentina) Ana Codina (second round)
40. (Brazil) Hugo Calderano / (Brazil) Caroline Kumahara (third round)
41. (Hungary) János Jakab / (Hungary) Szandra Pergel (fourth round)
42. (Republic of the Congo) Saheed Idowu / (Republic of the Congo) Onyinyechi Nwachukwu (first round)
43. (Ecuador) Alberto Mino / (Ecuador) Melanie Diaz (second round)
44. (Romania) Andrei Filimon / (Romania) Elizabeta Samara (second round)
45. (Thailand) Chaisit Chaitat / (Thailand) Nanthana Komwong (second round)
46. (India) Soumyajit Ghosh / (India) Mouma Das (second round)
47. (Belarus) Pavel Platonov / (Belarus) Katsiaryna Baravok (second round)
48. (Ukraine) Yaroslav Zhmudenko / (Ukraine) Tetyana Sorochynska (second round)
49. (Algeria) Aissa Belkadi / (Algeria) Islem Laid (first round)
50. (Guatemala) José Ramírez / (Guatemala) Andrea Estrada (second round)
51. (Nigeria) Segun Toriola / (Nigeria) Olufunke Oshonaike (first round)
52. (Guatemala) Hector Gatica / (Guatemala) Mabelyn Enriquez (second round)
53. (Algeria) Sami Kherouf / (Algeria) Lynda Loghraibi (second round)
54. (Chile) Felipe Olivares / (Chile) Natalia Castellano (first round)
55. (Serbia) Žolt Pete / (Serbia) Gabriela Feher (third round)
56. (Croatia) Tomislav Pucar / (Croatia) Lea Rakovac (second round)
57. (Chile) Gustavo Gómez / (Chile) Katherine Low (second round)
58. (Peru) Diego Rodríguez / (Peru) Janina Nieto (second round)
59. (Czech Republic) Tomáš Konečný / (Czech Republic) Hana Matelová (third round)
60. (Croatia) Tomislav Kolarek / (Croatia) Tian Yuan (third round)
61. (Latvia) Matīss Burģis / (Luxembourg) Ni Xialian (second round)
62. (Laos) Thavisack Phathaphone / (Laos) Seangdavieng Douangpanya (second round)
63. (Uruguay) Gonzalo Lorenzotti / (Uruguay) Maria Lorenzotti (first round)
64. (Luxembourg) Eric Glod / (Luxembourg) Sarah de Nutte (second round)

== Draw ==
=== Key ===
- Q = Qualifier
- w/o = Walkover
- w/d = Withdraw
- r = Retired
- DQ = Disqualified

=== Finals ===
Quarterfinals
1	(North Korea) Kim Hyok-bong (North Korea) Kim Jong	5	11	11	4	11	7	11
17	(China) Yan An (China) Wu Yang	11	8	8	11	6	11	7
32	(North Korea) Pak Sin-hyok (North Korea) Kim Hye-song	9	11	12	6	8	9
20	(Japan) Maharu Yoshimura (Japan) Kasumi Ishikawa	11	6	10	11	11	11
10	(Hong Kong) Wong Chun Ting (Hong Kong) Doo Hoi Kem	12	14	11	11
15	(Poland) Paweł Fertikowski (Poland) Katarzyna Grzybowska	10	12	2	5
5	(China) Xu Xin (South Korea) Yang Ha-eun	13	11	11	11
14	(Germany) Steffen Mengel (Germany) Petrissa Solja	11	6	9	7

Semifinals
1	(North Korea) Kim Hyok-bong (North Korea) Kim Jong	8	11	6	12	7	4
20	(Japan) Maharu Yoshimura (Japan) Kasumi Ishikawa	11	5	11	10	11	11
10	(Hong Kong) Wong Chun Ting (Hong Kong) Doo Hoi Kem	6	5	11	5	9
5	(China) Xu Xin (South Korea) Yang Ha-eun	11	11	9	11	11

Final
20	(Japan) Maharu Yoshimura (Japan) Kasumi Ishikawa	7	8	4	6
5	(China) Xu Xin (South Korea) Yang Ha-eun	11	11	11	11

=== Top half ===
==== Section 1 ====
First round
1	(North Korea) Kim H (North Korea) Kim J	11	11	11	11
(Mexico) Lara (Mexico) Serrano	3	1	6	1
(Sudan) Mohed (Sudan) Hussein	3	4	5	3
46	(India) Ghosh (India) Das	11	11	11	11
52	(Guatemala) Gatica (Guatemala) Enriquez	8	12	11	11	8	7	11
(New Zealand) Lin (New Zealand) Yang	11	10	5	5	11	11	6
(Portugal) Chen (Portugal) Oliveira	w/o
21	(Nigeria) Aruna (Nigeria) Edem
18	(Australia) Townsend (Puerto Rico) Diaz	11	13	11	11	7	12
(Switzerland) Weber (Switzerland) Moret	3	11	13	5	11	10
(Mongolia) Enkhbat (Mongolia) Batbayar	11	7	4	5	3
40	(Brazil) Calderano (Brazil) Kumahara	6	11	11	11	11
63	(Uruguay) G Lorenzotti (Uruguay) M Lorenzotti	4	8	5	9
(Netherlands) Tromer (Netherlands) Eerland	11	11	11	11
(Wales) Evans (Wales) Phillips	5	3	10	6
16	(Republic of the Congo) Saka (Republic of the Congo) Han	11	11	12	11

Second round
1	(North Korea) Kim H (North Korea) Kim J	11	11	5	11	11
46	(India) Ghosh (India) Das	7	3	11	7	9
52	(Guatemala) Gatica (Guatemala) Enriquez	4	11	11	1	7	7
(Portugal) Chen (Portugal) Oliveira	11	8	7	11	11	11
18	(Australia) Townsend (Puerto Rico) Diaz	2	12	5	6
40	(Brazil) Calderano (Brazil) Kumahara	11	14	11	11
(Netherlands) Tromer (Netherlands) Eerland	11	11	10	11	7	4	11
16	(Republic of the Congo) Saka (Republic of the Congo) Han	9	9	12	3	11	11	7

Third round
1	(North Korea) Kim H (North Korea) Kim J	8	11	12	11	11
(Portugal) Chen (Portugal) Oliveira	11	4	10	8	5
40	(Brazil) Calderano (Brazil) Kumahara	11	9	11	6	11	11
(Netherlands) Tromer (Netherlands) Eerland	13	11	9	11	9	13

Fourth round
1	(North Korea) Kim H (North Korea) Kim J	11	11	11	11
(Netherlands) Tromer (Netherlands) Eerland	8	4	5	8

==== Section 2 ====
First round
11	(France) Lebesson (China) Chen	11	11	11	11
(Pakistan) Abbas (Pakistan) Ansari	1	1	2	4
(Kosovo) B Çitaku (Kosovo) Janjeva	7	5	5	8
64	(Luxembourg) Glod (Luxembourg) De Nutte	11	11	11	11
56	(Croatia) Pucar (Croatia) Rakovac	9	11	11	11	11
(United States) K Jha (United States) P Jha	11	9	7	2	8
(Serbia) Karakašević (Lithuania) Paškauskienė	7	8	11	6	11	11	8
17	(China) Yan (China) Wu	11	11	9	11	7	8	11
26	(Czech Republic) Jančařík (Czech Republic) Vacenovská	12	14	11	7	8	11
(United States) Wang (United States) Hugh	10	12	7	11	11	4
(Macau) Che (Macau) Kuok	5	7	10	11	7
47	(Belarus) Platonov (Belarus) Baravok	11	11	12	9	11
41	(Hungary) Jakab (Hungary) Pergel	11	11	11	11
(Nepal) Bajracharya (Nepal) Maharjan	3	3	4	1
(Austria) Fegerl (Austria) Li	5	11	6	11	11	11
6	(Egypt) Assar (Egypt) Meshref	11	4	11	9	9	7

Second round
11	(France) Lebesson (China) Chen	11	11	11	11
64	(Luxembourg) Glod (Luxembourg) De Nutte	3	5	5	2
56	(Croatia) Pucar (Croatia) Rakovac	11	11	13	8	10	3
17	(China) Yan (China) Wu	2	7	15	11	12	11
26	(Czech Republic) Jančařík (Czech Republic) Vacenovská	11	11	8	11	11
47	(Belarus) Platonov (Belarus) Baravok	7	5	11	9	4
41	(Hungary) Jakab (Hungary) Pergel	12	3	11	7	9	12	11
(Austria) Fegerl (Austria) Li	10	11	7	11	11	10	6

Third round
11	(France) Lebesson (China) Chen	17	11	7	10	11	11
17	(China) Yan (China) Wu	15	7	11	12	13	13
26	(Czech Republic) Jančařík (Czech Republic) Vacenovská	11	8	4	8	11
41	(Hungary) Jakab (Hungary) Pergel	9	11	11	11	13

Fourth round
17	(China) Yan (China) Wu	11	11	8	11	11
41	(Hungary) Jakab (Hungary) Pergel	8	2	11	9	3

==== Section 3 ====
First round
7	(Chinese Taipei) Chen C (Chinese Taipei) Chen S	11	11	6	11	11
(India) Shetty (India) Batra	3	7	11	7	5
(Kazakhstan) Gerassimenko (Kazakhstan) Lavrova	7	7	8	9
45	(Thailand) Chaitat (Thailand) Komwong	11	11	11	11
58	(Peru) Rodríguez (Peru) Nieto
(Maldives) Moh Ahmed (Maldives) Nimal	w/o
(Canada) Bernadet (Canada) Luo	4	8	12	8
27	(Spain) He (Spain) Ramírez	11	11	14	11
32	(North Korea) Pak (North Korea) Kim	11	11	11	11
(Turkey) Gündüz (Turkey) Karahan	6	6	4	5
(Ukraine) Kou (Ukraine) Pesotska
35	(Venezuela) Diaz (Venezuela) Arvelo	w/o
36	(Romania) Ionescu (Romania) Szőcs	11	11	12	9	11
(Kosovo) L Çitaku (Kosovo) Maloku	6	3	10	11	4
(Greece) Kreanga (Greece) Papadaki	4	7	7	7
9	(Chinese Taipei) Chuang (Chinese Taipei) Cheng	11	11	11	11

Second round
7	(Chinese Taipei) Chen C (Chinese Taipei) Chen S	11	11	8	11	7	11
45	(Thailand) Chaitat (Thailand) Komwong	6	7	11	9	11	3
58	(Peru) Rodríguez (Peru) Nieto	4	5	5	6
27	(Spain) He (Spain) Ramírez	11	11	11	11
32	(North Korea) Pak (North Korea) Kim	11	11	11	11
(Ukraine) Kou (Ukraine) Pesotska	4	5	6	6
36	(Romania) Ionescu (Romania) Szőcs	11	11	5	8	11	11
9	(Chinese Taipei) Chuang (Chinese Taipei) Cheng	6	3	11	11	7	4

Third round
7	(Chinese Taipei) Chen C (Chinese Taipei) Chen S	11	11	12	11
27	(Spain) He (Spain) Ramírez	8	9	10	8
32	(North Korea) Pak (North Korea) Kim	11	12	11	11
36	(Romania) Ionescu (Romania) Szőcs	9	10	7	8

Fourth round
7	(Chinese Taipei) Chen C (Chinese Taipei) Chen S	9	14	9	9
32	(North Korea) Pak (North Korea) Kim	11	16	11	11

==== Section 4 ====
First round
13	(Mexico) Madrid (Mexico) Silva	11	11	11	11
(Sudan) Salah (Sudan) Kauther	2	2	3	1
(Israel) Rabinovich (Israel) Trosman
49	(Algeria) Belkadi (Algeria) Laid	w/o
43	(Ecuador) Mino (Ecuador) Diaz	11	11	11	11
(Maldives) Moo Ahmed (Maldives) Mohamed	3	6	7	2
(Slovenia) Žibrat (Slovenia) Galič	8	2	12	11	5
20	(Japan) Yoshimura (Japan) Ishikawa	11	11	14	5	11
24	(Australia) Powell (Australia) Fang	6	11	11	11	5	11
(Finland) Oláh (Sweden) Jonsson	11	5	9	6	11	9
(Sri Lanka) Sirisena (Sri Lanka) Madurangi	6	8	5	2
34	(Turkey) Menge (Turkey) Hu	11	11	11	11
50	(Guatemala) Ramírez (Guatemala) Estrada	11	11	9	9	11	6	11
(Latvia) Kartuzovs (Latvia) Majorova	7	6	11	11	7	11	5
(Malaysia) Leong (Malaysia) Ho	11	3	3	2	9
3	(South Korea) Lee (South Korea) Park	6	11	11	11	11

Second round
13	(Mexico) Madrid (Mexico) Silva	11	11	7	11	11	11	11
(Israel) Rabinovich (Israel) Trosman	13	13	11	6	8	4	7
43	(Ecuador) Mino (Ecuador) Diaz	7	2	3	3
20	(Japan) Yoshimura (Japan) Ishikawa	11	11	11	11
24	(Australia) Powell (Australia) Fang	9	15	8	8	5
34	(Turkey) Menge (Turkey) Hu	11	13	11	11	11
50	(Guatemala) Ramírez (Guatemala) Estrada	1	1	3	3
3	(South Korea) Lee (South Korea) Park	11	11	11	11

Third round
13	(Mexico) Madrid (Mexico) Silva	4	5	3	2
20	(Japan) Yoshimura (Japan) Ishikawa	11	11	11	11
34	(Turkey) Menge (Turkey) Hu	7	6	8	4
3	(South Korea) Lee (South Korea) Park	11	11	11	11

Fourth round
20	(Japan) Yoshimura (Japan) Ishikawa	8	9	11	9	13	11	11
3	(South Korea) Lee (South Korea) Park	11	11	9	11	11	9	7

=== Bottom half ===
==== Section 5 ====
First round
4	(Japan) Niwa (Japan) Hirano	11	11	11	11
(Singapore) Chew (Singapore) Li	4	3	2	6
(Finland) O'Connor (Puerto Rico) Rios	8	6	6	11	8
61	(Latvia) Burģis (Luxembourg) Ni	11	11	11	9	11
51	(Nigeria) Toriola (Nigeria) Oshonaike	13	6	8	11	5
(Netherlands) Oostwouder (Netherlands) Li	15	11	11	8	11
(Lithuania) Stankevičius (Lithuania) Stuckytė	1	11	6	10	10
22	(Sweden) Karlsson (Sweden) Ekholm	11	9	11	12	12
29	(Argentina) Alto (Argentina) Arguelles	w/o
(Scotland) Rumgay (Scotland) Edwards
(Scotland) Wheeler (Scotland) Whitaker	6	4	4	11	2
55	(Serbia) Pete (Serbia) Feher	11	11	11	9	11
39	(Argentina) Gilabert (Argentina) Codina	11	11	12	11
(Iceland) Guðmundsson (Iceland) Lárusdóttir	2	9	10	5
(Nepal) Malla (Nepal) Maharjan	1	2	1	4
10	(Hong Kong) Wong (Hong Kong) Doo	11	11	11	11

Second round
4	(Japan) Niwa (Japan) Hirano	11	11	11	11
61	(Latvia) Burģis (Luxembourg) Ni	6	9	9	6
(Netherlands) Oostwouder (Netherlands) Li	5	5	8	11	12	13
22	(Sweden) Karlsson (Sweden) Ekholm	11	11	11	6	10	15
(Scotland) Rumgay (Scotland) Edwards	9	6	14	6
55	(Serbia) Pete (Serbia) Feher	11	11	16	11
39	(Argentina) Gilabert (Argentina) Codina	11	11	9	4	2	5
10	(Hong Kong) Wong (Hong Kong) Doo	8	5	11	11	11	11

Third round
4	(Japan) Niwa (Japan) Hirano	11	11	4	14	11
22	(Sweden) Karlsson (Sweden) Ekholm	8	7	11	12	9
55	(Serbia) Pete (Serbia) Feher	10	11	4	9	8
10	(Hong Kong) Wong (Hong Kong) Doo	12	4	11	11	11

Fourth round
4	(Japan) Niwa (Japan) Hirano	7	8	5	6
10	(Hong Kong) Wong (Hong Kong) Doo	11	11	11	11

==== Section 6 ====
First round
15	(Poland) Fertikowski (Poland) Grzybowska	3	8	11	11	8	11	11
(Italy) Mutti (Italy) Piccolin	11	11	7	7	11	8	7
(Tunisia) Ben Yahia (Tunisia) Haj Salah	9	4	11	4	11	8
57	(Chile) Gómez (Chile) Low	11	11	6	11	2	11
59	(Czech Republic) Konečný (Czech Republic) Matelová	11	11	11	11
(Belarus) Khanin (Belarus) Trigolos	6	6	2	9
(Azerbaijan) Ismayilov (Azerbaijan) Guliyeva	10	5	3	9
25	(Egypt) El-Beiali (Egypt) El-Dawlatly	12	11	11	11
19	(Austria) Gardos (Austria) Liu	11	11	11	11
(Slovakia) Šereda (Slovakia) Ódorová	6	8	6	7
(Mongolia) Batkhishig (Mongolia) Gundegmaa	3	4	3	4
38	(Slovakia) Pištej (Slovakia) Balážová	11	11	11	11
37	(Thailand) Tanviriyavechakul (Thailand) Sawettabut	11	11	11	11
(Uzbekistan) Holikov (Uzbekistan) Gufranova	6	9	6	2
(Italy) Rech Daldosso (Italy) Vivarelli	1	7	12	4	6
8	(Singapore) Yang (Singapore) Yu	11	11	10	11	11

Second round
15	(Poland) Fertikowski (Poland) Grzybowska	11	10	11	11	11
57	(Chile) Gómez (Chile) Low	3	12	7	8	5
59	(Czech Republic) Konečný (Czech Republic) Matelová	11	11	12	9	8	11
25	(Egypt) El-Beiali (Egypt) El-Dawlatly	7	7	10	11	11	5
19	(Austria) Gardos (Austria) Liu	5	11	12	7	11	2	9
38	(Slovakia) Pištej (Slovakia) Balážová	11	9	10	11	8	11	11
37	(Thailand) Tanviriyavechakul (Thailand) Sawettabut	7	9	11	11	9	11	11
8	(Singapore) Yang (Singapore) Yu	11	11	8	8	11	8	13

Third round
15	(Poland) Fertikowski (Poland) Grzybowska	12	12	11	14
59	(Czech Republic) Konečný (Czech Republic) Matelová	10	10	8	12
38	(Slovakia) Pištej (Slovakia) Balážová	12	11	9	11	11
8	(Singapore) Yang (Singapore) Yu	10	6	11	6	7

Fourth round
15	(Poland) Fertikowski (Poland) Grzybowska	12	11	11	8	11
38	(Slovakia) Pištej (Slovakia) Balážová	10	8	0	11	9

==== Section 7 ====
First round
5	(China) Xu (South Korea) Yang	11	11	11	11
(Slovenia) Tokič (Slovenia) Fajmut	7	8	6	1
(Bulgaria) Alexandrov (Bulgaria) Zamfirova	9	6	7	4
48	(Ukraine) Zhmudenko (Ukraine) Sorochynska	11	11	11	11
44	(Romania) Filimon (Romania) Samara	11	11	11	11
(Azerbaijan) Jafarov (Azerbaijan) Imanova	8	5	4	2
(Macau) Chang (Macau) Wong	3	5	8	7
28	(Russia) Vlasov (Russia) Noskova	11	11	11	11
23	(Russia) Liventsov (Russia) Prokhorova	11	11	11	11
(Malaysia) Ibrahim (Malaysia) Lee	9	5	6	6
(Portugal) Geraldo (Portugal) Fins	11	11	11	11
54	(Chile) Olivares (Chile) Castellano	5	9	5	8
60	(Croatia) Kolarek (Croatia) Tian	11	9	11	13	11
(Bulgaria) Krastev (Bulgaria) Karova	2	11	8	11	7
(Uzbekistan) Kenjaev (Uzbekistan) Kim	8	9	1	6
12	(Poland) Wang (Poland) Partyka	11	11	11	11

Second round
5	(China) Xu (South Korea) Yang	11	11	11	11
48	(Ukraine) Zhmudenko (Ukraine) Sorochynska	7	5	5	6
44	(Romania) Filimon (Romania) Samara	5	7	11	8	11	8
28	(Russia) Vlasov (Russia) Noskova	11	11	5	11	4	11
23	(Russia) Liventsov (Russia) Prokhorova	11	11	11	11
(Portugal) Geraldo (Portugal) Fins	5	5	6	8
60	(Croatia) Kolarek (Croatia) Tian	5	11	11	2	6	11	17
12	(Poland) Wang (Poland) Partyka	11	3	4	11	11	6	15

Third round
5	(China) Xu (South Korea) Yang	11	11	11	11
28	(Russia) Vlasov (Russia) Noskova	9	6	6	7
23	(Russia) Liventsov (Russia) Prokhorova	12	3	11	11	10	10	11
60	(Croatia) Kolarek (Croatia) Tian	10	11	8	1	12	12	4

Fourth round
5	(China) Xu (South Korea) Yang	12	11	10	11	11	11
23	(Russia) Liventsov (Russia) Prokhorova	14	7	12	2	9	3

==== Section 8 ====
First round
14	(Germany) Mengel (Germany) Solja	11	4	11	11	8	11
(Canada) Thériault (Canada) Zhang	5	11	4	7	11	5
(Costa Rica) Calvo (Costa Rica) Martínez	8	11	5	9	7
62	(Laos) Phathaphone (Laos) Douangpanya	11	7	11	11	11
53	(Algeria) Kherouf (Algeria) Loghraibi	11	11	14	9	8	11	11
(Estonia) Smirnov (Estonia) Latt	13	5	12	11	11	5	8
(Switzerland) Schmid (Switzerland) Aschwanden	7	11	6	14	8	9
30	(Spain) Machado (Spain) Shen	11	7	11	12	11	11
31	(Brazil) Tsuboi (Brazil) Gui	11	11	11	8	13
(Israel) Tauber (Israel) Shoifer	8	4	5	11	11
(Wales) O'Connell (Wales) Carey	11	11	11	9	11
42	(Republic of the Congo) Idowu (Republic of the Congo) Nwachukwu	8	7	7	11	7
33	(France) Gauzy (France) Grundisch	11	13	11	11
(Venezuela) Correa (Venezuela) Montero	6	11	1	7
(Greece) Gionis (Greece) Toliou	11	7	8	11	6	2
2	(Hong Kong) Jiang (Hong Kong) Lee	3	11	11	5	11	11

Second round
14	(Germany) Mengel (Germany) Solja	w/o
62	(Laos) Phathaphone (Laos) Douangpanya
53	(Algeria) Kherouf (Algeria) Loghraibi	3	9	4	9
30	(Spain) Machado (Spain) Shen	11	11	11	11
31	(Brazil) Tsuboi (Brazil) Gui	11	9	11	7	11	5	3
(Wales) O'Connell (Wales) Carey	4	11	4	11	3	11	11
33	(France) Gauzy (France) Grundisch	6	7	7	8
2	(Hong Kong) Jiang (Hong Kong) Lee	11	11	11	11

Third round
14	(Germany) Mengel (Germany) Solja	11	7	11	11	11
30	(Spain) Machado (Spain) Shen	9	11	7	7	7
(Wales) O'Connell (Wales) Carey	7	8	7	5
2	(Hong Kong) Jiang (Hong Kong) Lee	11	11	11	11

Fourth round
14	(Germany) Mengel (Germany) Solja	7	13	14	11	11
2	(Hong Kong) Jiang (Hong Kong) Lee	11	11	12	5	7
