= Table tennis at the 2015 African Games – Men's doubles =

Men's doubles at table tennis at the 2015 All-Africa Games
- Location: Republic of the Congo; Brazzaville
- Dates: 10–19 September

Medalists
gold medal	(Republic of the Congo) Jianan Wang (Republic of the Congo) Bin Hu
silver medal	(Republic of the Congo) Suraju Saka (Republic of the Congo) Saheed Idowu
bronze medal	(Egypt) Ahmed Saleh (Egypt) El-sayed Lashin (Egypt) Khaled Assar (Egypt) Omar Assar

The men's doubles table tennis at the 2015 African Games was held from September 10 to 19, 2015, at several venues.

== Draw ==
=== Key ===
- Q = Qualifier
- w/o = Walkover
- w/d = Withdraw
- r = Retired
- DQ = Disqualified

=== Section ===
Round of 16
(Egypt) El-sayed Lashin (Egypt) Ahmed Saleh	11	11	11
(Libya) Hisham larifi (Libya) Adir Abushuwashi	5	2	8
(Ghana) Emmanuel Commey (Ghana) Bernard Sam	6	11	1	11	11
(Togo) Mawussi Agbetoglo (Togo) Rahma Houssein	11	3	11	9	4
(Algeria) Idir Khourta (Algeria) Sami Kherouf	11	11	6	7	8
(Tunisia) Adem Hmam (Tunisia) Thameur Mamia	7	3	11	11	11
(Republic of the Congo) Bin Hu (Republic of the Congo) Jianan Wang	14	11	11
(Nigeria) Qaudri Aruna (Nigeria) Seun Ajetunmobi	12	8	6
(Republic of the Congo) Suraju Saka (Republic of the Congo) Saheed Idowu	11	11	7	11
(Angola) Heiko Fleidl (Angola) Fabian Tait	7	4	11	6
(Ghana) Felix Lartey (Ghana) Derek Abrefa	7	7	11	11	11
(Mauritius) Allan Arnachellum (Mauritius) Jason Pontoise	11	11	3	2	3
(Nigeria) Segun Toriola (Nigeria) Ojo Onaolapo	11	11	11
(Togo) Amatey Amedee (Togo) Soudes Alassani	3	4	9
(Senegal) Olufunke Oshonaike (Senegal) Rashidat Ogundele	4	8	12	8
(Egypt) Omar Assar (Egypt) Khaled Assar	11	11	10	11

Quarterfinals
(Egypt) El-sayed Lashin (Egypt) Ahmed Saleh	11	11	11
(Ghana) Emmanuel Commey (Ghana) Bernard Sam	4	6	4
(Tunisia) Adem Hmam (Tunisia) Thameur Mamia	3	6	6
(Republic of the Congo) Bin Hu (Republic of the Congo) Jianan Wang	11	11	11
(Republic of the Congo) Suraju Saka (Republic of the Congo) Saheed Idowu	6	11	11	11
(Ghana) Felix Lartey (Ghana) Derek Abrefa	11	5	8	7
(Nigeria) Segun Toriola (Nigeria) Ojo Onaolapo	11	4	9	11	4
(Egypt) Omar Assar (Egypt) Khaled Assar	8	11	11	2	11

Semifinals
(Egypt) El-sayed Lashin (Egypt) Ahmed Saleh	18	6	9	6
(Republic of the Congo) Bin Hu (Republic of the Congo) Jianan Wang	16	11	11	11
(Republic of the Congo) Suraju Saka (Republic of the Congo) Saheed Idowu	3	17	11	12
]	(Egypt) Omar Assar (Egypt) Khaled Assar	11	15	5	10

Finals
(Republic of the Congo) Bin Hu (Republic of the Congo) Jianan Wang	11	11	11
(Republic of the Congo) Suraju Saka (Republic of the Congo) Saheed Idowu	5	9	1
