= Table tennis at the 2015 African Games – Women's doubles =

Women's doubles table tennis at the 2015 All-Africa Games
- Location: Republic of the Congo; Brazzaville
- Dates: 10–19 September

Medalists
gold medal	(Republic of the Congo) Yuheng Li (Republic of the Congo) Han Xing
silver medal	(Egypt) Dina Meshref (Egypt) Nadeen El-Dawlatly
bronze medal	(Nigeria) Olufunke Oshonaike (Nigeria) Rashidat Ogundele (Nigeria) Offiong Edem (Nigeria) Cecilia Offiong

The women's doubles table tennis at the 2015 African Games was held from September 10 to 19, 2015, at several venues.

== Draw ==
=== Key ===
- Q = Qualifier
- w/o = Walkover
- w/d = Withdraw
- r = Retired
- DQ = Disqualified

=== Section ===
Round of 16
(Egypt) Dina Meshref (Egypt) Nadeen El-Dawlatly	11	11	11
(Botswana) Boitshwarelo Butale (Botswana) Tshepiso Rebatenne	1	8	3
(Algeria) Lynda Loghraibi (Algeria) Katia Kessaci	11	11	6	11
(Republic of the Congo) Onyinyechi Nwachukwua (Republic of the Congo) Saprina Mazombo	9	3	11	8
(Ethiopia) Marta Gulti (Ethiopia) Meron Mekuria	11	7	9	1
(Democratic Republic of the Congo) Ammadine Litobaka (Democratic Republic of the Congo) Dacha Mongondi	9	11	11	11
(South Africa) Danisha Patel (South Africa) Caitlin Lingeveldt	7	6	9
(Nigeria) Olufunke Oshonaike (Nigeria) Rashidat Ogundele	11	11	11
(Republic of the Congo) Yuheng Li (Republic of the Congo) Han Xing	11	11	11
(Uganda) Amina Lukaaya (Uganda) Amina Kibone	1	5	7
(Mauritius) Felix Lartey (Mauritius) Derek Abrefa	4	8	12	4
(Egypt) Farah Abdel-Aziz (Egypt) Yousra Helmy	11	11	10	11
(Algeria) Sannah Lagsir (Algeria) Islem Laid	9	11	10	11	9
(South Africa) Zodwa Maphanga (South Africa) Khanyisile Madlala	11	4	12	3	11
(Democratic Republic of the Congo) Cyntia Nzangani (Democratic Republic of the Congo) Ruth Mkunda	5	6	9
(Nigeria) Offiong Edem (Nigeria) Cecilia Offiong	11	11	11

Quarterfinals
(Egypt) Dina Meshref (Egypt) Nadeen El-Dawlatly	11	9	11	11
(Algeria) Lynda Loghraibi (Algeria) Katia Kessaci	3	3	11	5
(Democratic Republic of the Congo) Ammadine Litobaka (Democratic Republic of the Congo) Dacha Mongondi	5	6	7
(Nigeria) Olufunke Oshonaike (Nigeria) Rashidat Ogundele	11	11	11
(Republic of the Congo) Yuheng Li (Republic of the Congo) Han Xing	11	5	2	11	11
(Egypt) Farah Abdel-Aziz (Egypt) Yousra Helmy	55	11	11	6	9
(South Africa) Zodwa Maphanga (South Africa) Khanyisile Madlala	5	9	4
(Nigeria) Offiong Edem (Nigeria) Cecilia Offiong	11	11	11

Semifinals
(Egypt) Dina Meshref (Egypt) Nadeen El-Dawlatly	11	11	11	6
(Nigeria) Olufunke Oshonaike (Nigeria) Rashidat Ogundele	6	5	8
(Republic of the Congo) Yuheng Li (Republic of the Congo) Han Xing	11	11	14	11
]	(Nigeria) Offiong Edem (Nigeria) Cecilia Offiong	13	6	12	6

Finals
(Egypt) Dina Meshref (Egypt) Nadeen El-Dawlatly	6	11	11	7	6
(Republic of the Congo) Yuheng Li (Republic of the Congo) Han Xing	11	8	4	11	11
