= Table tennis at the 2015 African Games – Women's singles =

Women's singles table tennis at the 2015 All-Africa Games
- Location: Republic of the Congo; Brazzaville
- Dates: 10–19 September

Medalists
gold medal	(Egypt) Dina Meshref
silver medal	(Egypt) Nadeen El-Dawlatly
bronze medal	(Nigeria) Olufunke Oshonaike (Republic of the Congo) Han Xing

The Women's singles table tennis at the 2015 African Games was held from September 10 to 19, 2015, at several venues.

== Draw ==
=== Key ===
- Q = Qualifier
- w/o = Walkover
- w/d = Withdraw
- r = Retired
- DQ = Disqualified

=== Section ===
First round
(Egypt) Dina Meshref	11	14	11	11
(Republic of the Congo) Yuheng Li	6	12	7	5
(Algeria) Lynda Loghraibi	4	4	8	4	4
(Nigeria) Offiong Edem	11	11	11	11	8	8
(Egypt) Farah Abdel-Aziz	7	11	11	11	13
(Democratic Republic of the Congo) A Litobaka	11	3	7	3	3
(Nigeria) Rashidat Ogundele	3	5	7	5
(Republic of the Congo) Han Xing	11	11	11	11
(Nigeria) Olufunke Oshonaike	11	11	11	11
(Republic of the Congo) Saprina Mazombo	2	7	0	2
(Algeria) Sannah Lagsir	12	12	3	3	9	7
(Egypt) Yousra Helmy	10	10	11	11	11	11
(Nigeria) Cecilia Akpan	11	11	11	11
(Seychelles) A Benstrong	5	7	6	5
(Algeria) Islem Laid	6	8	9	11	8
(Egypt) Nadeen El-Dawlatly	11	11	11	9	10	11

Quarter-finals
(Egypt) Dina Meshref	11	11	8	10	11
(Nigeria) Offiong Edem	9	2	11	12	7
(Egypt) Farah Abdel-Aziz	6	8	13	7	11
(Republic of the Congo) Han Xing	11	11	11	11	13
(Nigeria) Olufunke Oshonaike	11	5	8	11	11	11
(Egypt) Yousra Helmy	7	11	11	6	8	6
(Nigeria) Cecilia Akpan	7	10	8	9
(Egypt) Nadeen El-Dawlatly	11	11	11	11

Semi-finals
(Egypt) Dina Meshref	9	11	11	11	11	11
(Republic of the Congo) Han Xing	11	7	13	9	4	8
(Nigeria) Olufunke Oshonaike	11	8	9	13	5	10
(Egypt) Nadeen El-Dawlatly	4	11	11	11	11	12

Final
(Egypt) Dina Meshref	7	11	11	14	11
(Egypt) Nadeen El-Dawlatly	11	8	6	12	9
