= Table tennis at the 2015 African Games – Men's singles =

Men's singles table tennis at the 2015 African Games
- Location: (Republic of the Congo) Brazzaville
- Dates: 10–19 September

Medalists
gold medal	Omar Assar	Egypt
silver medal	Quadri Aruna	Nigeria
bronze medal	Khaled Assar	Egypt
bronze medal	Wang Jianan	Republic of the Congo

The men's singles table tennis at the 2015 African Games was held from September 10-19, 2015, at several venues.

== Draw ==
=== Key ===
- Q = Qualifier
- w/o = Walkover
- w/d = Withdraw
- r = Retired
- DQ = Disqualified

=== Section ===
Round of 16
(Egypt) Omar Assar	11	11	13	11	12
(Nigeria) Bode Abiodun	5	6	15	7	10
(Nigeria) Seun Ajetunmobi	11	11	7	9	4	11	11
(Republic of the Congo) Saheed Idowu	6	9	11	11	11	8	8
(Nigeria) Segun Toriola	11	6	11	11	13
(Madagascar) Jonathan Nativel	6	11	7	7	11
(Republic of the Congo) Wang Jianan	7	11	9	11	11	11
(Egypt) Mohamed El-Beiali	11	8	11	7	7	3
(Egypt) El-sayed Lashin	8	9	9	9
(Nigeria) Ojo Onaolapo	11	11	11	11
(Republic of the Congo) Hu Bin	5	4	7	11	9
(Egypt) Khalid Assar	11	11	11	6	11
(Egypt) Ahmed Saleh	3	12	8	11	10	11	11
(Republic of the Congo) Suraju Saka	11	10	11	9	12	2	9
(Algeria) Idir Khourta	6	8	9	11	8
(Nigeria) Quadri Aruna	11	11	11	9	11

Quarterfinals
(Egypt) Omar Assar	11	11	11	11
(Republic of the Congo) Saheed Idowu	6	5	9	6
(Nigeria) Segun Toriola	6	6	12	8	7
(Republic of the Congo) Wang Jianan	11	11	10	11	11
(Nigeria) Ojo Onaolapo	9	15	3	9	5
(Egypt) Khalid Assar	11	13	11	11	11
(Egypt) Ahmed Saleh	11	8	9	6	9
(Nigeria) Quadri Aruna	7	11	11	11	11

Semifinals
(Egypt) Omar Assar	11	7	11	12	5	11	11
(Republic of the Congo) Wang Jianan	5	11	1	14	11	9	7
(Egypt) Khalid Assar	9	6	9	8
(Nigeria) Quadri Aruna	11	11	11	11

Finals
(Egypt) Omar Assar	11	11	16	11	11
(Nigeria) Quadri Aruna	8	6	18	6	6
