= 2018 African Table Tennis Championships =

- Date: September 3–9 2018
- Location: Port Louis, Mauritius
- Venue: Beau Bassin sports complex, Cnr Herchenrode & Pope Hennessy
- African Table Tennis Championships

The 2018 African Table Tennis Championships is a table tennis tournament held in Port Louis, Mauritius, from 3 to 9 September 2018.

Quadri Aruna won his first African Championships men's singles title.

== Medalists ==
Event	Gold	Silver	Bronze
Men's singles	(Nigeria) Quadri Aruna	(Egypt) Ahmed Saleh	(Nigeria) Olajide Omotayo
Men's singles	(Nigeria) Quadri Aruna	(Egypt) Ahmed Saleh	(Nigeria) Segun Toriola
Women's singles	(Egypt) Dina Meshref	(Egypt) Reem El-Eraky	(Nigeria) Offiong Edem
Women's singles	(Egypt) Dina Meshref	(Egypt) Reem El-Eraky	(Egypt) Amira Yousry
Men's doubles	(Egypt) Youssef Abdel-Aziz (Egypt) Khalid assar	(Egypt) Mohamed El-Beiali (Egypt) Ahmed Saleh	(Nigeria) Quadri Aruna (Nigeria) Segun Toriola
Men's doubles	(Egypt) Youssef Abdel-Aziz (Egypt) Khalid assar	(Egypt) Mohamed El-Beiali (Egypt) Ahmed Saleh	(Ivory Coast) Kanate Ali (Ivory Coast) Oba Kizito Oba
Women's doubles	(Egypt) Farah Abdel-Aziz (Egypt) Reem El-Eraky	(Egypt) Yousra Helmy (Egypt) Dina Meshref	(South Africa) Simeen Mookrey (South Africa) Danisha Patel
Women's doubles	(Egypt) Farah Abdel-Aziz (Egypt) Reem El-Eraky	(Egypt) Yousra Helmy (Egypt) Dina Meshref	(Algeria) Lynda Loghraibi (Algeria) Katia Kessaci
Mixed doubles	(Egypt) Ahmed Saleh (Egypt) Dina Meshref	(Nigeria) Segun Toriola (Nigeria) Olufunke Oshonaike	(Egypt) Khalid Assar (Egypt) Yousra Helmy
Mixed doubles	(Egypt) Ahmed Saleh (Egypt) Dina Meshref	(Nigeria) Segun Toriola (Nigeria) Olufunke Oshonaike	(Egypt) Mohamed El-Beiali (Egypt) Farah Abdel-Aziz
Men's team	Nigeria	Egypt	Togo
Women's team	Egypt	Nigeria	Algeria

== Medal table ==
Rank	Nation	Gold	Silver	Bronze	Total
1	Egypt	5	5	3	13
2	Nigeria	2	2	4	8
3	Algeria	0	0	2	2
4	Ivory Coast	0	0	1	1
4	South Africa	0	0	1	1
4	Togo	0	0	1	1
Totals (6 entries)		7	7	12	26
