= Table tennis at the 2019 African Games =

- Venue: Salle Moulay El Hassan
- Location: Rabat, Morocco
- Dates: 20–29 August

Table tennis at the 2019 African Games was held from 20 to 29 August 2019 in Rabat, Morocco.

The event served as a qualifier for the 2020 Summer Olympics in Tokyo, Japan.

== Participating nations ==
- Algeria
- Angola
- Cameroon
- Chad
- Democratic Republic of the Congo
- Republic of the Congo
- Djibouti
- Egypt
- Eritrea
- Ethiopia
- Gabon
- Ghana
- Guinea
- Kenya
- Madagascar
- Mauritania
- Mauritius
- Morocco
- Niger
- Nigeria
- Senegal
- South Africa
- Togo
- Tunisia
- Uganda

== Medal table ==
Rank	Nation	Gold	Silver	Bronze	Total
1	Egypt (EGY)	4	2	4	10
2	Nigeria (NGR)	2	4	4	10
3	Algeria (ALG)	1	0	2	3
4	Cameroon (CMR)	0	1	0	1
5	Tunisia (TUN)	0	0	3	3
6	Republic of the Congo (CGO)	0	0	1	1
Totals (6 entries)		7	7	14	28

== Medalists ==
=== Men ===
Event	Gold	Silver	Bronze
Singles	Olajide Omotayo; Nigeria	Quadri Aruna; Nigeria	Omar Assar; Egypt
Singles	Olajide Omotayo; Nigeria	Quadri Aruna; Nigeria	Segun Toriola; Nigeria
Doubles	Algeria (ALG); Mohamed Boudjadja; Sami Kherouf	Egypt (EGY); Ahmed Saleh; Mohamed El-Beialy	Tunisia (TUN); Adam Hmam; Thameur Mamia
Doubles	Algeria (ALG); Mohamed Boudjadja; Sami Kherouf	Egypt (EGY); Ahmed Saleh; Mohamed El-Beialy	Nigeria (NGR); Segun Toriola; Olajide Omotayo
Team	Egypt (EGY); Khalid Assar; Omar Assar; Mohamed El-Beialy; Mahmoud Helmy; Ahmed Saleh	Nigeria (NGR); Bode Abiodun; Quadri Aruna; Taiwo Mati; Olajide Omotayo; Segun Toriola	Tunisia (TUN); Omar Ammous; Kerem Ben Yahia; Adam Hmam; Thameur Mamia; Abderrazek Souabni
Team	Egypt (EGY); Khalid Assar; Omar Assar; Mohamed El-Beialy; Mahmoud Helmy; Ahmed Saleh	Nigeria (NGR); Bode Abiodun; Quadri Aruna; Taiwo Mati; Olajide Omotayo; Segun Toriola	Republic of the Congo (CGO); Christ Bienatiki; Saheed Idowu; Michel Lignandzi

=== Women ===
Event	Gold	Silver	Bronze
Singles	Dina Meshref; Egypt	Sarah Hanffou; Cameroon	Farah Abdel-Aziz; Egypt
Singles	Dina Meshref; Egypt	Sarah Hanffou; Cameroon	Offiong Edem; Nigeria
Doubles	Nigeria (NGR); Offiong Edem; Cecilia Akpan	Nigeria (NGR); Olufunke Oshonaike; Fatimo Bello	Algeria (ALG); Katia Kessaci; Lynda Loghraibi
Doubles	Nigeria (NGR); Offiong Edem; Cecilia Akpan	Nigeria (NGR); Olufunke Oshonaike; Fatimo Bello	Egypt (EGY); Dina Meshref; Yousra Helmy
Team	Egypt (EGY); Farah Abdel-Aziz; Mariam Al-Hodaby; Reem El-Eraky; Yousra Helmy; Dina Meshref	Nigeria (NGR); Cecilia Akpan; Fatimo Bello; Offiong Edem; Nuratu Ajoke Ojomu; Olufunke Oshonaike	Algeria (ALG); Hiba Feredj; Katia Kessaci; Lynda Loghraibi; Widad Nouari
Team	Egypt (EGY); Farah Abdel-Aziz; Mariam Al-Hodaby; Reem El-Eraky; Yousra Helmy; Dina Meshref	Nigeria (NGR); Cecilia Akpan; Fatimo Bello; Offiong Edem; Nuratu Ajoke Ojomu; Olufunke Oshonaike	Tunisia (TUN); Manel Baklouti; Fadwa Garci; Abir Haj Salah; Safa Saidani; Maram Zoghlami

=== Mixed ===
Event	Gold	Silver	Bronze
Doubles	Egypt (EGY); Omar Assar; Dina Meshref	Egypt (EGY); Ahmed Saleh; Farah Abdel-Aziz	Egypt (EGY); Mohamed Elbeialy; Reem Eleraky
Doubles	Egypt (EGY); Omar Assar; Dina Meshref	Egypt (EGY); Ahmed Saleh; Farah Abdel-Aziz	Nigeria (NGR); Bode Abiodun; Offiong Edem
