= Hana Goda =

Egyptian table tennis player (born 2007)

Personal information
- Full name: Hana Ayman Hussin Mohamed Goda
- Nationality: Egypt
- Born: 12 December 2007 (age 18)

Sport
- Country: Egypt
- Sport: Table Tennis
- Coached by: هشام
- Highest ranking: 20 (19 April 2026)
- Current ranking: 21 (28 September 2026)
Medal record
Women's table tennis
Representing Egypt
African Games
Gold medal – first place	2023 Accra	Singles
Gold medal – first place	2023 Accra	Team
Mediterranean Games
Gold medal – first place	2022 Oran	Team
Gold medal – first place	2026 Taranto	Singles
Gold medal – first place	2026 Taranto	Team
Silver medal – second place	2026 Taranto	Mixed doubles
African Championships
Gold medal – first place	2024 Addis Ababa	Singles
Gold medal – first place	2024 Addis Ababa	Doubles
Gold medal – first place	2024 Addis Ababa	Team

Hana Ayman Hussin Mohamed Goda (born 12 December 2007) is an Egyptian table tennis player, currently ranked 20th in the ITTF women's rankings, and the highest-rated woman in Africa.

In May 2022, she became the youngest player to win the ITTF Africa Cup, when she was 14 years and 7 months old.

Goda competed for Egypt at the 2024 Summer Olympics.

== Major performance ==
Year	Venue	Seed	Preliminary	Round 64	Round 32	Round of 16	Quarterfinals	Semifinals	Final / BM	
Year	Venue	Seed	Opposition Result	Opposition Result	Opposition Result	Opposition Result	Opposition Result	Opposition Result	Opposition Result	Rank
Representing Egypt
Olympic Games
2024	Paris, France	#20	Bye	(#41) B Eerland (NED); L 0-4 (9-11, 11-13, 6-11, 6-11)	Did not advance					
World Championships
2025	Doha, Qatar	#19	(Australia) J Wu; W 4-1 (10-12, 11-5, 11-6, 11-5, 11-8)	(Brazil) G Takahashi; W 4-1 (9-11, 11-4, 11-5, 11-7, 11-7)	(#4) (China) Y Wang; L 0-4 (7-11, 10-12, 4-11, 7-11)	Did not advance				
2023	Durban, South Africa	#28	(Switzerland) R Moret; W 4-1 (11-7, 11-5, 11-3, 9-11, 13-11)	(Chinese Taipei) Y-j Li; L 1-4 (11-8, 9-11, 3-11, 7-11, 4-11)	Did not advance					
African Games
2023	Accra, Ghana	—N/a	—N/a	Bye	A Haj Salah (TUN); W 3-0 (11-7, 11-4, 11-5)	C Kwabi (GHA); W 3-0 (11-6, 11-2, 11-4)	L Loghraibi (ALG); W 4-0 (11-8, 11-9, 11-3, 11-3)	L Mobarek (ALG); W 4-1 (11-9, 11-5, 11-3, 9-11, 13-11)	D Meshref (EGY); W 4-2 (14-12, 11-6, 11-5, 9-11, 7-11, 12-10)	1st place, gold medalist(s)
African Championships
2025	Tunis, Tunisia	—N/a	—N/a	Bye	(Democratic Republic of the Congo) J Kayembe; W 4-0 (11-1, 11-4, 11-3, 11-3)	(Nigeria) S Aiyelabegan; W 4-0 (11-4, 11-3, 11-4, 11-2)	(Madagascar) H Raharimanana; W 4-1 (9-11, 11-1, 11-6, 11-4, 11-2)	(Egypt) M Alhodaby; W 4-0 (11-8, 11-7, 11-3, 11-6)	(Egypt) D Meshref; W 4-0 (11-8, 11-5, 11-8, 11-5)	1st place, gold medalist(s)
2024	Addis Ababa, Ethiopia	—N/a	—N/a	Bye	(Ghana) C Baah-Danso; W 4-0 (11-4, 11-2, 11-5, 11-3)	(Uganda) J Nangonzi; W 4-0 (11-7, 11-8, 11-3, 11-4)	(Egypt) M Alhodaby; W 4-2 (11-8, 10-12, 11-8, 12-10, 9-11, 11-5)	(Egypt) H Fathy; W 4-1 (9-11, 11-5, 12-10, 11-8, 11-5)	(Egypt) M Alhodaby; W 4-3 (10-12, 11-7, 12-10, 11-4, 9-11, 8-11, 11-8)	1st place, gold medalist(s)
2023	Tunis, Tunisia	—N/a	—N/a	Bye	(Mauritius) N Jalim; W 4-0 (11-4, 11-8, 11-6, 11-6)	(Tunisia) F Garci; W 4-2 (11-4, 15-17, 11-9, 9-11, 11-5, 11-5)	(Nigeria) F Bello; W 4-0 (11-8, 11-6, 16-14, 11-9)	(Egypt) M Alhodaby; W 4-0 (11-5, 11-5, 11-8, 11-5)	(Egypt) D Meshref; W 4-1 (11-7, 11-4, 13-11, 8-11, 11-4)	1st place, gold medalist(s)
2022	Algiers, Algeria	—N/a	—N/a	Bye	(Algeria) M Nasri; W 4-0 (11-7, 11-4, 11-5, 11-3)	(Tunisia) A Haj Salah; W 4-0 (11-1, 11-7, 11-8, 12-10)	(Cameroon) S Hanffou; W 4-0 (11-5, 11-5, 11-3, 11-5)	(Egypt) D Meshref; L 1-4 (11-7, 8-11, 8-11, 9-11, 6-11)	Did not advance	3rd place, bronze medalist(s)
2021	Yaoundé, Cameroon	—N/a	—N/a	(Kenya) J Compell; W 4-0 (11-5, 11-5, 11-3, 11-1)	(Togo) AF Amah; W 4-0 (11-2, 11-2, 11-4, 11-4)	(Nigeria) O Oshonaike; W 4-0 (11-3, 11-4, 11-6, 12-10)	(Egypt) F Abdelaziz; W 4-2^{INJ} (6-11, 11-9, 17-19, 11-6, 11-3, 11-0)	(Egypt) D Meshref; W 4-2 (12-10, 8-11, 7-11, 11-8, 12-10, 11-9)	(Egypt) M Alhodaby; L 3-4 (12-14, 11-5, 11-7, 13-11, 6-11, 11-13, 6-11)	2nd place, silver medalist(s)
