= 2018 ITTF Team World Cup – Women's team =

The women's team event of the 2018 ITTF Team World Cup took place at the Copper Box Arena in London from 22 to 25 February 2018.

All times are local (GMT).

== Medallists ==
Event	Gold	Silver	Bronze
Women's team	China; Chen Xingtong; Ding Ning; Liu Shiwen; Wang Manyu; Zhu Yuling	Japan; Hina Hayata; Miu Hirano; Kasumi Ishikawa; Mima Ito	Hong Kong; Doo Hoi Kem; Lee Ho Ching; Mak Tze Wing; Ng Wing Nam; Soo Wai Yam Minnie
Women's team	China; Chen Xingtong; Ding Ning; Liu Shiwen; Wang Manyu; Zhu Yuling	Japan; Hina Hayata; Miu Hirano; Kasumi Ishikawa; Mima Ito	North Korea; Cha Hyo Sim; Choe Hyon Hwa; Kim Nam Hae; Kim Song-i

== Tournament ==
=== Seeding ===
Teams were seeded based on the ITTF World Ranking of the three highest-ranked players in each team, as at February 2018.

1. Japan
2. China
3. Hong Kong
4. Chinese Taipei
5. Romania
6. Singapore
7. Brazil
8. Egypt
9. North Korea
10. United States
11. Australia
12. England

=== Group stage ===
The group stage took place from 22 to 23 February.

==== Group A ====
Pos	Team	Pld	W	L	MW	ML	Pts	Qualification
1	Japan	2	2	0	6	0	4	Advanced to knockout stage
2	United States	2	1	1	3	4	3	Advanced to knockout stage
3	Egypt	2	0	2	1	6	2	

22 February; 10:00	Report	Japan	3–0	United States	Copper Box Arena, London
Score by game:
Hina Hayata / Mima Ito	3–0	Amy Wang / Jennifer Wu
Kasumi Ishikawa	3–1	Lily Zhang
Mima Ito	3–1	Jennifer Wu

22 February; 17:00	Report	Japan	3–0	Egypt	Copper Box Arena, London
Score by game:
Hina Hayata / Mima Ito	3–0	Farah Abdel-Aziz / Yousra Helmy
Kasumi Ishikawa	3–1	Dina Meshref
Hina Hayata	3–0	Yousra Helmy

23 February; 10:00	Report	Egypt	1–3	United States	Copper Box Arena, London
Score by game:
Farah Abdel-Aziz / Yousra Helmy	0–3	Jennifer Wu / Lily Zhang
Dina Meshref	3–0	Amy Wang
Yousra Helmy	1–3	Jennifer Wu
Farah Abdel-Aziz	1–3	Amy Wang

==== Group B ====
Pos	Team	Pld	W	L	MW	ML	Pts	Qualification
1	China	2	2	0	6	0	4	Advanced to knockout stage
2	North Korea	2	1	1	3	3	3	Advanced to knockout stage
3	Brazil	2	0	2	0	6	2	

22 February; 10:00	Report	China	3–0	North Korea	Copper Box Arena, London
Score by game:
Ding Ning / Liu Shiwen	3–1	Cha Hyo Sim / Kim Nam Hae
Zhu Yuling	3–0	Kim Song-i
Ding Ning	3–1	Kim Nam Hae

22 February; 17:00	Report	China	3–0	Brazil	Copper Box Arena, London
Score by game:
Chen Xingtong / Zhu Yuling	3–0	Caroline Kumahara / Bruna Takahashi
Wang Manyu	3–0	Gui Lin
Chen Xingtong	3–1	Bruna Takahashi

23 February; 10:00	Report	Brazil	0–3	North Korea	Copper Box Arena, London
Score by game:
Caroline Kumahara / Bruna Takahashi	0–3	Cha Hyo Sim / Kim Nam Hae
Gui Lin	0–3	Kim Song-i
Bruna Takahashi	1–3	Kim Nam Hae

==== Group C ====
Pos	Team	Pld	W	L	MW	ML	Pts	Qualification
1	Hong Kong	2	2	0	6	1	4	Advanced to knockout stage
2	Singapore	2	1	1	4	4	3	Advanced to knockout stage
3	England	2	0	2	1	6	2	

22 February; 10:00	Report	Hong Kong	3–0	England	Copper Box Arena, London
Score by game:
Lee Ho Ching / Soo Wai Yam Minnie	3–1	Kelly Sibley / Maria Tsaptsinos
Doo Hoi Kem	3–0	Tin-Tin Ho
Soo Wai Yam Minnie	3–0	Kelly Sibley

22 February; 17:00	Report	Hong Kong	3–1	Singapore	Copper Box Arena, London
Score by game:
Lee Ho Ching / Soo Wai Yam Minnie	3–2	Feng Tianwei / Yu Mengyu
Doo Hoi Kem	3–1	Yee Herng Hwee
Lee Ho Ching	1–3	Feng Tianwei
Doo Hoi Kem	3–0	Yu Mengyu

23 February; 10:00	Report	Singapore	3–1	England	Copper Box Arena, London
Score by game:
Feng Tianwei / Yu Mengyu	3–0	Kelly Sibley / Maria Tsaptsinos
Zhang Wanling	1–3	Tin-Tin Ho
Yu Mengyu	3–1	Kelly Sibley
Feng Tianwei	3–0	Tin-Tin Ho

==== Group D ====
Pos	Team	Pld	W	L	MW	ML	Pts	Qualification
1	Chinese Taipei	2	2	0	6	1	4	Advanced to knockout stage
2	Romania	2	1	1	4	3	3	Advanced to knockout stage
3	Australia	2	0	2	0	6	2	

22 February; 10:00	Report	Chinese Taipei	3–0	Australia	Copper Box Arena, London
Score by game:
Chen Szu-yu / Cheng Hsien-tzu	3–0	Parleen Kaur / Melissa Tapper
Cheng I-ching	3–1	Jian Fang Lay
Cheng Hsien-tzu	3–0	Melissa Tapper

22 February; 17:00	Report	Chinese Taipei	3–1	Romania	Copper Box Arena, London
Score by game:
Chen Szu-yu / Cheng Hsien-tzu	3–0	Daniela Monteiro Dodean / Elizabeta Samara
Cheng I-ching	0–3	Bernadette Szőcs
Chen Szu-yu	3–1	Elizabeta Samara
Cheng I-ching	3–2	Daniela Monteiro Dodean

23 February; 10:00	Report	Romania	3–0	Australia	Copper Box Arena, London
Score by game:
Daniela Monteiro Dodean / Elizabeta Samara	3–0	Parleen Kaur / Jian Fang Lay
Bernadette Szőcs	3–0	Melissa Tapper
Elizabeta Samara	3–0	Jian Fang Lay

=== Knockout stage ===
The knockout stage took place from 23 to 25 February.

Quarterfinals
Japan	3
Singapore	1
North Korea	3
Chinese Taipei	0
Hong Kong	3
Romania	0
United States	0
China	3

Semifinals
Japan	3
North Korea	0
Hong Kong	0
China	3

Final
Japan	0
China	3

==== Quarterfinals ====
23 February; 17:00	Report	Japan	3–1	Singapore	Copper Box Arena, London
Score by game:
Hina Hayata / Mima Ito	3–0	Yee Herng Hwee / Yu Mengyu
Kasumi Ishikawa	3–0	Feng Tianwei
Hina Hayata	1–3	Yu Mengyu
Kasumi Ishikawa	3–0	Yee Herng Hwee

23 February; 17:00	Report	North Korea	3–0	Chinese Taipei	Copper Box Arena, London
Score by game:
Cha Hyo Sim / Kim Nam Hae	3–2	Chen Szu-yu / Cheng Hsien-tzu
Kim Song-i	3–1	Cheng I-ching
Cha Hyo Sim	3–1	Chen Szu-yu

23 February; 17:00	Report	Hong Kong	3–0	Romania	Copper Box Arena, London
Score by game:
Doo Hoi Kem / Lee Ho Ching	3–1	Daniela Monteiro Dodean / Elizabeta Samara
Soo Wai Yam Minnie	3–2	Bernadette Szőcs
Lee Ho Ching	3–0	Elizabeta Samara

23 February; 17:00	Report	United States	0–3	China	Copper Box Arena, London
Score by game:
Amy Wang / Jennifer Wu	0–3	Ding Ning / Liu Shiwen
Lily Zhang	0–3	Wang Manyu
Jennifer Wu	0–3	Liu Shiwen

==== Semifinals ====
24 February; 10:00	Report	Japan	3–0	North Korea	Copper Box Arena, London
Score by game:
Hina Hayata / Mima Ito	3–0	Cha Hyo Sim / Kim Nam Hae
Kasumi Ishikawa	3–0	Kim Song-i
Hina Hayata	3–1	Cha Hyo Sim

24 February; 19:00	Report	Hong Kong	0–3	China	Copper Box Arena, London
Score by game:
Ng Wing Nam / Soo Wai Yam Minnie	0–3	Ding Ning / Liu Shiwen
Doo Hoi Kem	1–3	Zhu Yuling
Ng Wing Nam	0–3	Ding Ning

==== Final ====
25 February; 11:00	Report	Japan	0–3	China	Copper Box Arena, London
Score by game:
Hina Hayata / Mima Ito	1–3	Ding Ning / Liu Shiwen
Kasumi Ishikawa	0–3	Zhu Yuling
Mima Ito	0–3	Ding Ning
