= Quadri Aruna =

Nigerian table tennis player (born 1988)

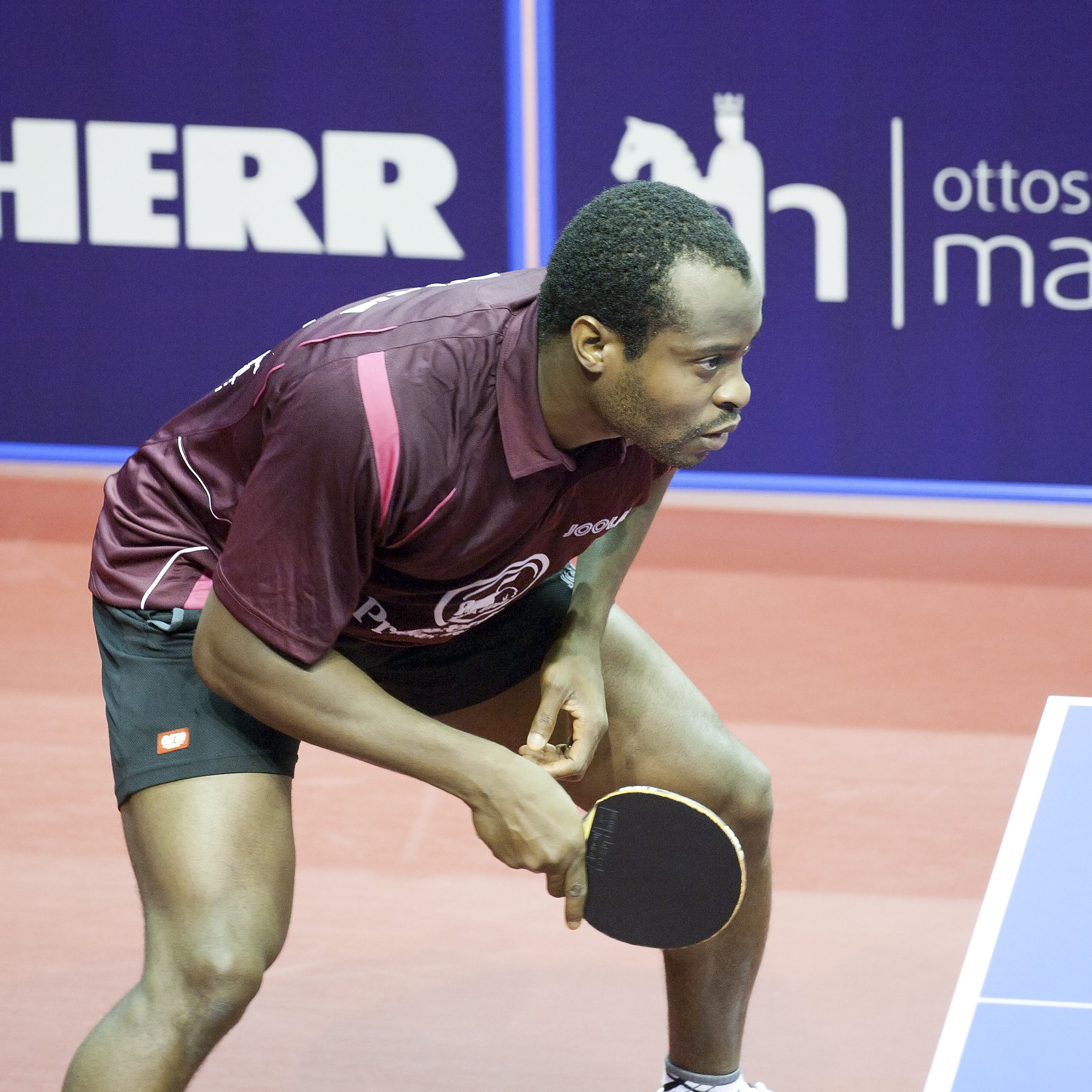
- Aruna Quadri at the ITTF World Tour 2017 German Open

Personal information
- Full name: Quadri Akinade Aruna
- Nickname: Rocky Aruna or Quadri Balboa
- Nationality: Nigerian
- Born: 9 August 1988 (age 38) Oyo, Nigeria

Sport
- Sport: Table tennis
- Club: Gazprom Fakel Orenburg
- Playing style: Attacker
- Highest ranking: 10 (13 June 2022)
- Current ranking: 99 (2 November 2026)
Medal record
Men's table tennis
Representing Nigeria
Commonwealth Games
Silver medal – second place	2018 Gold Coast	Singles
African Games
Gold medal – first place	2015 Brazzaville	Team
Silver medal – second place	2011 Maputo	Team
Silver medal – second place	2015 Brazzaville	Singles
Silver medal – second place	2019 Rabat	Singles
Silver medal – second place	2019 Rabat	Team
Silver medal – second place	2023 Accra	Singles
Silver medal – second place	2023 Accra	Team
African Championships
Gold medal – first place	2008 Kinshasa	Team
Gold medal – first place	2015 Cairo	Doubles
Gold medal – first place	2016 Agadir	Doubles
Gold medal – first place	2018 Port Louis	Singles
Gold medal – first place	2018 Port Louis	Team
Gold medal – first place	2021 Yaoundé	Doubles
Gold medal – first place	2022 Algiers	Singles
Gold medal – first place	2023 Rades	Singles
Gold medal – first place	2024 Addis Ababa	Team

Quadri Akinade Aruna (born 9 August 1988) is a professional Nigerian table tennis player. He competed for Nigeria at the 2012 Summer Olympics, 2016 Summer Olympics, and 2020 Summer Olympics, reaching the quarter-finals in 2016. He is the first African player to be ranked in the top 10 in the world.

At the World Cup 2014, he reached the quarter-finals in the Men's Singles competition.

In the 2017 ITTF World Challenge Bulgaria Open, he advanced to the semi-finals, where the eventual winner Dimitrij Ovtcharov defeated him in a tight match. Aruna is known for his forehand-oriented playing style, which has earned him many wins. He is a Gewo-sponsored player.

In 2014, he was ranked number 30 in world table tennis, and the International Table Tennis Federation named him the Star Player of the Year. He was also part of the Nigerian team that won bronze at the 2014 Commonwealth Games.

At the club level, Aruna Quadri recently teamed up with TTC RhönSprudel Fulda-Maberzell, a top German Bundesliga Table Tennis club.

In 2018, he was declared as Africa's most successful Olympic table tennis player of all time by the Olympics in an article.

== Career ==
=== 2016 Olympics ===
Aruna entered the Men's Singles event at the 2016 Summer Olympics as seed number 27. In the first round, he played and defeated Slovak player Wang Yang (4-1). In the second round, Aruna played the number 5 seed Chuang Chih-yuan. Chuang grew repeatedly frustrated as the match went on, uncharacteristically missing his signature forehand attacks and was at a loss against Aruna's unorthodox style. Aruna defeated Chuang in arguably the tournament's biggest upset without losing a single set (4-0). Aruna faced world-renowned German player Timo Boll in the third round. Aruna defeated Boll (4-2), earning him a spot in the Quarter Finals. In the Quarter Finals, Aruna faced the tournament's number one seed, a Chinese player Ma Long. Long overwhelmed Aruna with fast-paced, looping attacks. The match proved entertaining as Aruna was forced to play defensively and back from the table, providing memorable rallies. Ultimately, Long swept Aruna to move onto the Semis (0-4).

Aruna's run in the Singles event of the 2016 Olympic games was quite easily the most remarkable achievement of his career at the world level. Having upset number 5 seed, a semi-finalist in the previous Olympics, and four-time World Tour Champion as well as ten-time runner-up, Aruna also upset a European legend in Boll. Although eventual winner Ma Long swept Aruna, Long also swept the Gold medal match. He was the only African competitor to reach the fourth round.

In the team event, Aruna competed alongside Segun Toriola and Bode Abiodun. The team was seeded against Team China in the first round, in which Aruna played and was defeated by Ma Long (1-3). The team lost all three matches to China and was eliminated (0-3).

=== 2017 ITTF African Cup ===
Aruna competed in the 2017 ITTF African Cup, qualifying for the quarter-finals, where he defeated Algeria's Naim Karali (4-1). In the semi-finals, Aruna defeated Egyptian player Mohamed El-beiali (4-3), qualifying for the finals. In the Finals, Aruna played and defeated long-time rival Omar Assar in a close match (4-3). Aruna won the event and became the 2017 African Cup Champion.

=== 2017 World Table Tennis Championships ===
Aruna competed in the World Championships, seeded as number 30. He defeated Chilean player Gustavo Gómez (4-0). A Danish player and number 34 seed, Jonathan Groth, defeated him in the second round.

=== 2018 ITTF African-Cup ===
Aruna competed in the 2018 ITTF African Cup, placing first in group 2, allowing him to qualify for the Quarterfinals. In the Quarterfinals, Aruna defeated Derek Abrefa (4-0). In the Semi-Finals, he defeated Ahmed Saleh (4-1), allowing him to advance to the finals of the African Cup.

The 2018 African Cup Finals featured two of the only African players within the top 50 of the ITTF World Rankings, 2015 and 2016 Champion Omar Assar against reigning 2017 Champion Aruna. Assar, seeking retribution for last year's defeat, played a very aggressive attacking game, winning the first two games with close scores (10-12 and 8-11). The third game entailed a dominant performance from Aruna, attacking Assar relentlessly (11-3). In the fourth game, Assar targeted Aruna's deep forehand, forcing Aruna to play much more uncomfortably than in the previous games. However, Assar lost some points in an earnest attempt to end rallies early. Assar took the game (11-13). Aruna won the next two games (11-9 and 11–6), tying the two up 3-3. In the final game, Assar took an early lead of 3–7, following a few well-placed shots and missed attacks from Aruna. Aruna rallied back into an 8–10 deficit before losing the final point on a failed forehand loop (3-4). The loss placed Aruna second in the 2018 African Cup.

The rivalry extends beyond the two world-class players into the feud for African Table Tennis supremacy between Egypt and Nigeria, having both produced some of the continent's strongest players over the last decade (Segun Toriola, Monday Merotohun, Olufunke Oshonaike, Dina Meshref, El-sayed Lashin, etc.). This emotion is highlighted in the match's aftermath as Assar celebrated to the cheers of his fans on the top of the table.

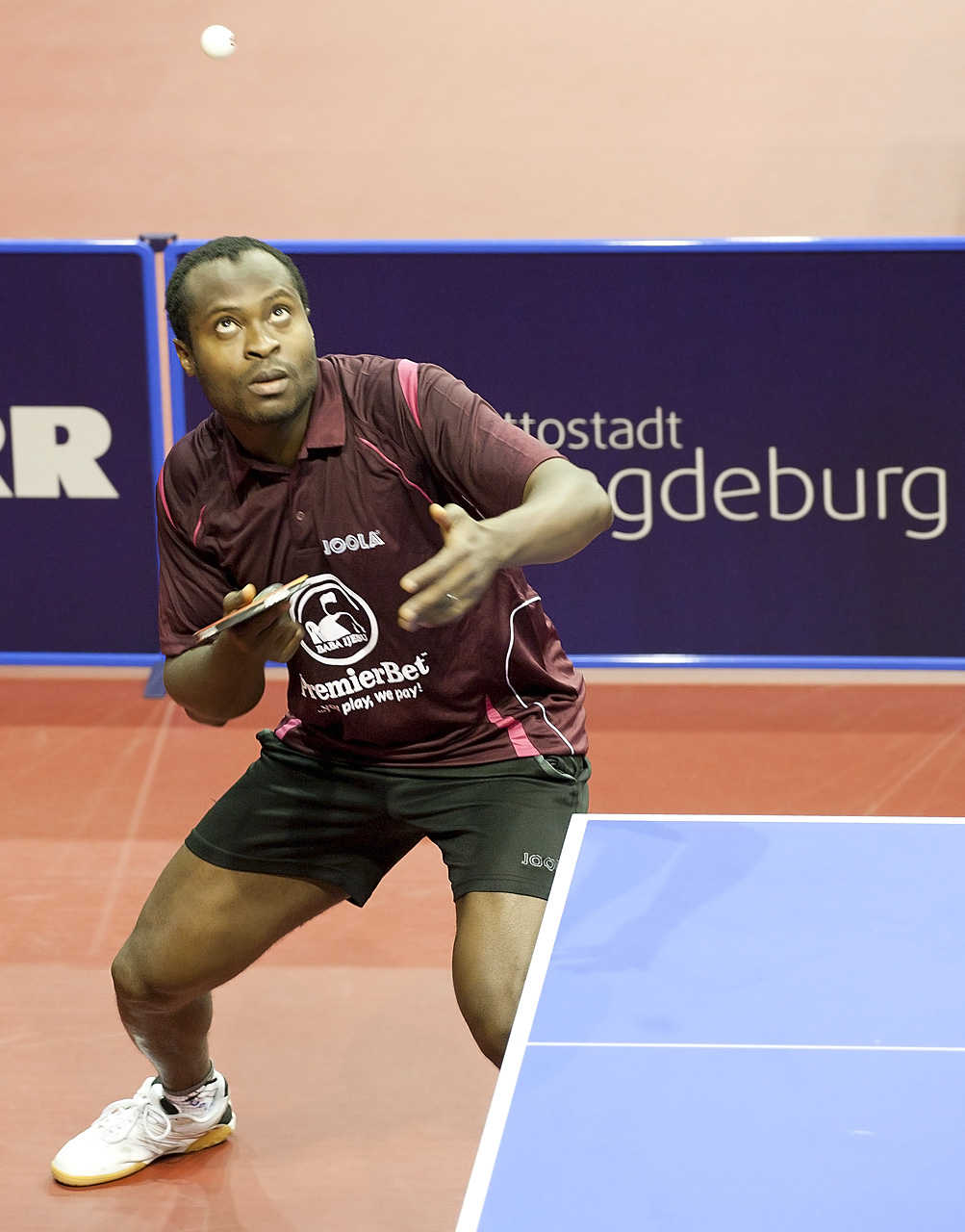
ITTF World Tour 2017 German Open

=== 2019 Nigeria Open Table Tennis Championship ===
In 2019, Quadri Aruna won the Nigeria Open men's singles title.

=== 2021 ===
Aruna reached the quarter-finals of the WTT Contender event at WTT Doha. He lost 3-1 in the quarter-finals to Lin Yun-Ju after saving four match points and nearly mounting a comeback.

Quadri reached the quarter-finals of the World Table Tennis Championships in Houston but lost 2-4 to Sweden's Truls Möregårdh, the eventual silver medalist.

=== 2026 Major League Table Tennis ===
Aruna announced that he will play in Major League Table Tennis League’s fourth season. He was drafted No. 1 overall by the Atlanta Blazers in the league’s annual draft lottery held in April 2026. Aruna signed an agreement to compete in all eighteen scheduled league matches this season.

== Important matches ==
- 2016 Olympics
  - (3R) Quadri Aruna 4:0 Chuang Chih-yuan (11:6, 12:10, 11:6, 11:7)
  - (4R) Timo Boll 2:4 Quadri Aruna (10:12, 10:12, 5:11, 11:3, 11:5, 9:11)
  - (QF) Ma Long 4:0 Quadri Aruna (11:4, 11:2, 11:6, 11:7)
- 2019 World Championships
  - (3R) Fan Zhendong 4:0 Quadri Aruna (12:10, 11:2, 11:6, 11:9)
- 2020 ITTF Finals
  - (Round of 16) Quadri Aruna 0:4 Xu Xin (10:12, 8:11, 6:11, 5:11)
- 2021 WTT Cup Finals Singapore
  - (Round of 16) Liang Jingkun 1:3 Quadri Aruna (11-7, 1-11, 12-14, 5-11)
- 2023 Singapore Smash
  - Round of 16 (Quadri Aruna 3:0 Tomokazu Harimoto)

== Personal life ==
He is married to another table tennis player Aruna Olateju Ganiyat and has three children. Quadri attended Oba Adeyemi High School, Oyo State, Nigeria, where he represented the school, Oyo East Local Government Area and Oyo State at various table tennis competitions.

== Awards ==
Aruna Quadri won the Outstanding Sportsman of the Year award at the 2018 Nigerian Sports Award.

Olympic Games
Preceded by Ngozi Onwumere	Flag bearer for Nigeria; Tokyo 2020 with Odunayo Adekuoroye	Succeeded by Seun Adigun
