= 2024 African Table Tennis Championships =

- Date: 12–19 October 2024
- Edition: 27th
- Location: Addis Ababa, Ethiopia
- Venue: Ethiopian Sport Academy
- African Table Tennis Championships

The 2024 African Table Tennis Championships was a table tennis tournament that was held in Addis Ababa, Ethiopia, from 12 to 19 October 2024.

== Medalists ==
| Event | Gold | Silver | Bronze |
|---|---|---|---|
| Men's singles | (Egypt) Omar Assar | (Egypt) Youssef Abdel-Aziz | (Egypt) Mahmoud Helmy |
| Men's singles | (Egypt) Omar Assar | (Egypt) Youssef Abdel-Aziz | (Ethiopia) Dufera Darara Mokonen |
| Women's singles | (Egypt) Hana Goda | (Egypt) Mariam Alhodaby | (Egypt) Hend Fathy |
| Women's singles | (Egypt) Hana Goda | (Egypt) Mariam Alhodaby | (Egypt) Yousra Abdel Razek |
| Men's doubles | (Nigeria) Muizz Adegoke (Nigeria) Abdulbasit Abdulfatai | (Nigeria) Matthew Kuti (Nigeria) Olajide Omotayo | (Egypt) Mohamed El Beiali (Egypt) Youssef Abdel-Aziz |
| Men's doubles | (Nigeria) Muizz Adegoke (Nigeria) Abdulbasit Abdulfatai | (Nigeria) Matthew Kuti (Nigeria) Olajide Omotayo | (Egypt) Aly Ghallab (Egypt) Mahmoud Helmy |
| Women's doubles | (Egypt) Hend Fathy (Egypt) Hana Goda | (Algeria) Yassamine Bouhenni (Algeria) Malissa Nasri | (Egypt) Mariam Alhodaby (Egypt) Marwa Alhodaby |
| Women's doubles | (Egypt) Hend Fathy (Egypt) Hana Goda | (Algeria) Yassamine Bouhenni (Algeria) Malissa Nasri | (Nigeria) Fatimo Bello (Nigeria) Hope Udoaka |
| Mixed doubles | (Egypt) Youssef Abdel-Aziz (Egypt) Mariam Alhodaby | (Algeria) Milhane Jellouli (Algeria) Amina Kessaci | (Egypt) Mahmoud Helmy (Egypt) Hend Fathy |
| Mixed doubles | (Egypt) Youssef Abdel-Aziz (Egypt) Mariam Alhodaby | (Algeria) Milhane Jellouli (Algeria) Amina Kessaci | (Nigeria) Matthew Kuti (Nigeria) Ajoke Ojomu |
| Men's team | Nigeria; Quadri Aruna; Abdulbasit Abdulfatai; Matthew Kuti; Olajide Omotayo; Muizz Adegoke | Algeria; Sami Kherouf; Milhane Jellouli; Abderrahmane Azzala; Maheidine Bella | Ethiopia; Melese Habteyes; Melaku Mindahun; Darara Mokonen Dufera; Kalab Maregn Bireba; Amanual Hadsh |
| Men's team | Nigeria; Quadri Aruna; Abdulbasit Abdulfatai; Matthew Kuti; Olajide Omotayo; Muizz Adegoke | Algeria; Sami Kherouf; Milhane Jellouli; Abderrahmane Azzala; Maheidine Bella | Tunisia; Myshaal Sabhi; Mohamed Khaloufi; Wassim Essid; Firas Chaieb |
| Women's team | Egypt; Hana Goda; Mariam Alhodaby; Yousra Abdel Razek; Marwa Alhodaby; Hend Fathy | Nigeria; Aziza Sezuo; Aishat Rabiu; Ajoke Ojomu; Hope Udoaka; Fatimo Bello | Uganda; Judith Nangonzi; Jemimah Nakawala; Patience Anyango |
| Women's team | Egypt; Hana Goda; Mariam Alhodaby; Yousra Abdel Razek; Marwa Alhodaby; Hend Fathy | Nigeria; Aziza Sezuo; Aishat Rabiu; Ajoke Ojomu; Hope Udoaka; Fatimo Bello | Algeria; Yassamine Bouhenni; Amina Kessaci; Malissa Nasri; Lynda Loghraibi; Cheima Merzoug |

== Medal table ==
* Host nation (Ethiopia)

| Rank | Nation | Gold | Silver | Bronze | Total |
|---|---|---|---|---|---|
| 1 | Egypt | 5 | 2 | 7 | 14 |
| 2 | Nigeria | 2 | 2 | 2 | 6 |
| 3 | Algeria | 0 | 3 | 1 | 4 |
| 4 | Ethiopia* | 0 | 0 | 2 | 2 |
| 5 | Tunisia | 0 | 0 | 1 | 1 |
| 5 | Uganda | 0 | 0 | 1 | 1 |
| Totals (6 entries) | | 7 | 7 | 14 | 28 |
