= Khalid Assar =

Egyptian table tennis player

Personal information
- Nationality: Egypt
- Born: 10 December 1992 (age 33) Desouk

Sport
- Sport: Table Tennis
Medal record
Men's table tennis
Representing Egypt
African Games
Gold medal – first place	2019 Rabat	Team
Gold medal – first place	2023 Accra	Team
Silver medal – second place	2015 Brazzaville	Team
Silver medal – second place	2023 Accra	Doubles
Bronze medal – third place	2015 Brazzaville	Singles
Bronze medal – third place	2015 Brazzaville	Doubles
- Updated on 24 August 2016

Khalid Assar (born 10 December 1992) is an Egyptian table tennis player. At the 2016 Summer Olympics he competed in the Men's Singles where he lost to Wang Jianan of Congo in the preliminary round.

He qualified to represent Egypt at the 2020 Summer Olympics.

His brother is fellow Olympian, Omar Assar.
