= Belkadi =

Belkadi is an Algerian surname. Notable people with the surname include:

- Aissa Belkadi, Algerian table tennis player
- Amina Belkadi (born 1992), Algerian judoka
- Jean Marc Belkadi, American jazz fusion guitarist
- Ridha Belkadi (1925–2012), Tunisian chess master
