= Cecilia Offiong =

Nigerian table tennis player

Personal information
- Full name: Cecilia Otu Offiong
- Nationality: Nigeria
- Born: 13 June 1986 (age 40) Calabar, Cross River, Nigeria
- Height: 1.58 m (5 ft 2 in)
- Weight: 56 kg (123 lb)

Sport
- Sport: Table tennis
- Club: Calabar Sports Club
- Playing style: Right-handed, shakehand
- Highest ranking: 333 (June 2009)
- Current ranking: 452 (February 2013)
Medal record
Women's table tennis
Representing Nigeria
All-Africa Games
Gold medal – first place	2007 Algiers	Doubles
Gold medal – first place	2007 Algiers	Team
Gold medal – first place	2011 Maputo	Doubles
Silver medal – second place	2011 Maputo	Team
Bronze medal – third place	2007 Algiers	Singles

Cecilia Otu Offiong-Akpan (born 13 June 1986 in Calabar, Cross River) is a Nigerian table tennis player. She won two gold medals, along with her partner Offiong Edem, in the women's doubles at the 2007 All-Africa Games in Algiers, Algeria, and at the 2011 All-Africa Games in Maputo, Mozambique. As of February 2013, Offiong is ranked no. 452 in the world by the International Table Tennis Federation (ITTF). She is a member of the table tennis team for Calabar Sports Club, and is coached and trained by Obisanya Babatunde. Offiong is also right-handed, and uses the shakehand grip.

Offiong made her official debut, as an 18-year-old, at the 2004 Summer Olympics in Athens, where she competed in both singles and doubles tournaments. For her first event, the women's singles, Offiong defeated Brazil's Lígia Silva in the preliminary round, before losing out her next match to North Korea's Kim Yun-Mi, with a unanimous set score of 0–4. Offiong also teamed up with her partner Offiong Edem in the women's doubles, where they lost the first round match to Russian duo Oksana Fadeyeva and Galina Melnik, receiving a final set score of 3–4.

Four years after competing in her first Olympics, Offiong qualified for her second Nigerian team, as a 22-year-old, at the 2008 Summer Olympics in Beijing, by placing third from the All-Africa Games in Algiers, Algeria, and receiving a continental spot for Africa in the women's team under ITTF's Computer Team Ranking List. Offiong joined with her fellow players and Olympic veterans Olufunke Oshonaike and Bose Kaffo for the inaugural women's team event. She and her team placed fourth in the preliminary pool round against Singapore, United States, and the Netherlands, receiving a total of three points and three straight losses. In the women's singles, Offiong lost the preliminary round match to Australia's Miao Miao, with a unanimous set score of 0–4.
