= Table tennis at the 2011 All-Africa Games =

Table tennis at the 2011 All-Africa Games in Maputo, Mozambique was held on September 3–13, 2011.

== Medal summary ==
Event	Gold	Silver	Bronze
Men's Singles	Omar Assar (EGY)	El-sayed Lashin (EGY)	Ahmed Ali Saleh (EGY)
Women's Singles	Offiong Edem (NGA)	Olufunke Oshonaike (NGA)	Han Xing (CGO)
Men's Doubles	Egypt; Ahmed Ali Saleh; El-sayed Lashin	Egypt; Omar Assar; Emad Moselhy	Republic of the Congo; Suraju Saka; Saheed Idowu; Nigeria; Segun Toriola; Monday Merotohun
Women's Doubles	Nigeria; Offiong Edem; Cecilia Akpan	Nigeria; Olufunke Oshonaike; Janet Effiom	Egypt; Nadeen El-Dawlatly; Dina Meshref; Republic of the Congo; Han Xing; Onyinyechi Nwachukwu
Mixed Doubles	Nigeria; Segun Toriola; Offiong Edem	Nigeria; Monday Merotohun; Olufunke Oshonaike	Egypt; Omar Assar; Dina Meshref; Egypt; El-sayed Lashin; Nadeen El-Dawlatly
Men's Team	Egypt	Nigeria	Algeria
Women's Team	Egypt	Nigeria	Republic of the Congo

=== Medal table ===
Rank	Nation	Gold	Silver	Bronze	Total
1	Egypt	4	2	4	10
2	Nigeria	3	5	1	9
3	Congo	0	0	4	4
4	Algeria	0	0	1	1
Totals (4 entries)		7	7	10	24
