= Table tennis at the 2015 African Games =

- Location: Republic of the Congo; Brazzaville
- Dates: 10–19 September

Table tennis at the 2015 African Games in Brazzaville was held between September 10 to 19, 2015.

== Medal summary ==
Event	Gold	Silver	Bronze
Men's singles	Omar Assar; Egypt	Quadri Aruna; Nigeria	Khalid Assar; Egypt
Men's singles	Omar Assar; Egypt	Quadri Aruna; Nigeria	Wang Jianan; Republic of the Congo
Men's doubles	Republic of the Congo; Hu Bin; Wang Jianan	Republic of the Congo; Suraju Saka; Saheed Idowu	Egypt; El-sayed Lashin; Ahmed Saleh
Men's doubles	Republic of the Congo; Hu Bin; Wang Jianan	Republic of the Congo; Suraju Saka; Saheed Idowu	Egypt; Omar Assar; Khalid Assar
Men's team	Nigeria; Bode Abiodun; Seun Ajetunmobi; Quadri Aruna; Ojo Onaolapo; Segun Toriola	Egypt; Khalid Assar; Omar Assar; Mohamed El-Beiali; El-Sayed Lashin; Ahmed Saleh	Republic of the Congo; Christ Bienatiki; Hu Bin; Saheed Idowu; Suraju Saka; Wang Jianan
Women's singles	Dina Meshref; Egypt	Nadeen El-Dawlatly; Egypt	Olufunke Oshonaike; Nigeria
Women's singles	Dina Meshref; Egypt	Nadeen El-Dawlatly; Egypt	Han Xing; Republic of the Congo
Women's doubles	Republic of the Congo; Li Yuheng; Han Xing	Egypt; Dina Meshref; Nadeen El-Dawlatly	Nigeria; Olufunke Oshonaike; Rashidat Ogundele
Women's doubles	Republic of the Congo; Li Yuheng; Han Xing	Egypt; Dina Meshref; Nadeen El-Dawlatly	Nigeria; Offiong Edem; Cecilia Offiong
Women's team	Egypt; Farah Abdelaziz; Nadeen El-Dawlatly; Yousra Helmy; Dina Meshref	Nigeria; Cecilia Akpan; Offiong Edem; Rashidat Ogundele; Olufunke Oshonaike	Republic of the Congo; Han Xing; Li Yuheng; Nwachukwu Onyinyechi
Mixed doubles	Republic of the Congo; Wang Jianan; Li Yuheng	Nigeria; Ojo Onaolapo; Olufunke Oshonaike	Egypt; Omar Assar; Dina Meshref
Mixed doubles	Republic of the Congo; Wang Jianan; Li Yuheng	Nigeria; Ojo Onaolapo; Olufunke Oshonaike	Egypt; Ahmed Saleh; Farah Abdel-Aziz

== Medals table ==
Rank	Nation	Gold	Silver	Bronze	Total
1	Egypt (EGY)	3	3	5	11
2	Congo (CGO)	3	1	4	8
3	Nigeria (NGA)	1	3	3	7
Totals (3 entries)		7	7	12	26
