= Larbi Bouriah =

Algerian table tennis player

Personal information
- Nationality: Algeria
- Born: 24 February 1983 (age 42); Créteil, France

Sport
- Sport: Table tennis
- Club: Courbevoie Sport Tennis de Table

Larbi Bouriah (Arabic: العربي•بورياح; born 24 February 1983) is an Algerian table tennis player. He competed in the 2020 Summer Olympics. He finished in 49th place after losing to Bence Majoros of Hungary in the first round of the men's singles.
