= Omar Assar =

Egyptian table tennis player (born 1991)

Personal information
- Full name: Omar Muhammadi Muhammad Muhammad Assar
- Born: 22 July 1991 (age 35) Desouk, Egypt
- Height: 1.94 m (6 ft 4 in)
- Weight: 92 kg (203 lb)

Sport
- Sport: Table tennis
- Playing style: shake hand grip, right handed
- Highest ranking: 13 (6 May 2024)
- Current ranking: 28 (2 November 2026)
Medal record
Men's table tennis
Representing Egypt
African Games
Gold medal – first place	2011 Maputo	Singles
Gold medal – first place	2011 Maputo	Team
Gold medal – first place	2015 Brazzaville	Singles
Gold medal – first place	2019 Rabat	Team
Gold medal – first place	2019 Rabat	Mixed Doubles
Gold medal – first place	2023 Accra	Singles
Gold medal – first place	2023 Accra	Team
Silver medal – second place	2011 Maputo	Doubles
Silver medal – second place	2015 Brazzaville	Team
Bronze medal – third place	2011 Maputo	Mixed Doubles
Bronze medal – third place	2015 Brazzaville	Doubles
Bronze medal – third place	2015 Brazzaville	Mixed Doubles
Bronze medal – third place	2019 Rabat	Mixed Doubles
African Championships
Gold medal – first place	2010 Yaounde	Team
Gold medal – first place	2010 Yaounde	Doubles
Gold medal – first place	2012 Cairo	Mixed Doubles
Gold medal – first place	2012 Cairo	Team
Gold medal – first place	2015 Cairo	Singles
Gold medal – first place	2015 Cairo	Mixed Doubles
Gold medal – first place	2015 Cairo	Team
Gold medal – first place	2024 Addis Ababa	Singles
Silver medal – second place	2010 Yaounde	Singles
Silver medal – second place	2012 Cairo	Singles
Silver medal – second place	2012 Cairo	Doubles
Bronze medal – third place	2015 Cairo	Doubles
Africa Senior Cup
Gold medal – first place	2015 Yaounde	Singles
Africa TOP 16 Cup
Bronze medal – third place	2014 Lagos	Singles
Mediterranean Games
Gold medal – first place	2013 Mersin	Singles
Silver medal – second place	2022 Oran	Singles
Silver medal – second place	2026 Taranto	Mixed doubles
Silver medal – second place	2026 Taranto	Team
Pan Arab Games
Gold medal – first place	2011 Doha	Team
Silver medal – second place	2011 Doha	Singles
Islamic Solidarity Games
Silver medal – second place	2025 Riyadh	Singles

Omar Muhammadi Muhammad Muhammad Assar (born 22 July 1991) is an Egyptian table tennis player. He won silver in singles and gold in team play at the 2011 Arab Games in Doha. He also competed at the 2012 and 2016 Summer Olympics in the Men's singles, but was defeated in the second round on both occasions.

== Career ==
2012 Olympics

At the 2012 Summer Olympics, Assar competed in the men's singles, where he lost in the second round to Panagiotis Gionis, and the men's team event, where Egypt lost in the first round to Austria.

2016 Olympics

At the 2016 Summer Olympics, Assar competed in the men's singles only. He lost in the second round again, this time narrowly losing 3–4 to Lei Kou of Ukraine.

ITTF World Championships 2017

Men's singles

Assar competed in the 2017 World Table Tennis Championships, seeded as number 50, facing off against Italian player Marco Rech in the first round, whom he defeated in a close match (4–3), having lost the first 3 sets. In the second round, he was defeated by Hong Kong player, and number 7 seed Wong Chun Ting (2–4).

Men's doubles

Assar teamed with fellow Egyptian player Mohamed El-Beiali for the doubles event, in which they were unseeded and faced the number 5 seed Brazilian of Hugo Calderano and Gustavo Tsuboi, losing the match (2–4).

"Mixed Doubles"

Assar teamed with fellow Egyptian player Dina Meshref for the mixed doubles event, seeded as number 12 team. They advanced to the third round of the tournament, before being eliminated by the Spanish team of Álvaro Robles and Galia Dvorak (1–4).

All-African Games

Assar won both the 2015 and 2016 All-African Games, Men's Singles. In 2017, his three-peat was interrupted by Nigerian table tennis player, Quadri Aruna, who defeated Assar in the tournament final (3–4).

2018 ITTF African-Cup

Assar defeated Tunisian table tennis player Thameur Mamia (4–1) in the quarterfinals of the event. He then defeated Saheed Idowu in the semifinal (4–0). Finally, Assar defeated long-time rival Quadri Aruna in the final of the event in order to win his third African-Cup.

2020 Olympics

At the 2020 Summer Olympics, Assar finished 5th in the men's singles event after losing to China's Ma Long in the quarterfinals. He also competed in the men's team event and the mixed doubles.

As of August 2021, Omar is ranked 36th in the world in the ITTF world rankings. He reached his highest ranking of 16th in March 2016.

2026 Major League Table Tennis

Assar was the first-round pick for The Florida Crocs in the 2026 Major League Table Tennis draft.
