= Saheed Idowu =

Congolese table tennis player

Personal information
- Nationality: Republic of the Congo
- Born: 3 January 1990 (age 36) Brazzaville, Congo
- Height: 174 cm (5 ft 9 in)
- Weight: 71 kg (157 lb)

Sport
- Sport: Table Tennis
Medal record
Men's Table Tennis
Representing Republic of the Congo
All-Africa Games
Silver medal – second place	2015 Brazzaville	Doubles
Bronze medal – third place	2011 Maputo	Doubles
Bronze medal – third place	2019 Rabat	Team

Saheed Idowu (born 3 January 1990 in Brazzaville) is a Congolese table tennis player. He competed at the 2012 Summer Olympics in the Men's singles, but was defeated in the preliminary round.

== 2018 ITTF African-Cup ==
Idowu competed in the 2018 ITTF African-Cup, placing second in group 2 behind Quadri Aruna, dropping the group match to Aruna (1-3), allowing him to qualify for the Quarter Finals. In the Quarter Finals, Idowu faced and defeated African Table Tennis legend Segun Toriola (4-2). In the Semi Finals, Idowu lost to eventual winner Omar Assar, dropping four straight games (0-4). He was then paired against Ahmed Saleh in the placement round, losing that match (1-3), finishing the tournament in fourth place.

== Playing style ==
Like most modern Table Tennis players, Idowu favors a forehand attacking style. His forehand loop is noted as appearing rather relaxed and unorthodox.
