= Aissa Belkadi =

Algerian Table Tennis player

Aissa Belkadi is an Algerian Table Tennis player. Belkadi competed in the 2018 ITTF African-Cup, finishing third place in group 3 thus being eliminating from contention. In the placement round, Belkadi defeated Allan Arnachellum (3–0), before losing to both Kurt Lingeveldt (0–3) and Shane Overmeyer (2–3), finishing twelfth in the event.
