= Idir Khourta =

Algerian table tennis player

Personal information
- Full name: Idir Abdullah Khourta
- Nationality: Algeria
- Born: 26 July 1986 (age 40) Sète, France
- Height: 1.75 m (5 ft 9 in)
- Weight: 70 kg (154 lb)

Sport
- Sport: Table tennis
- Club: Fréjus Sports Club
- Playing style: Left-handed, classic
- Equipment: Yasaka Offensif 40
- Highest ranking: 489 (December 2008)
- Current ranking: 522 (February 2013)

Idir Abdullah Khourta (Arabic: إدير عبدالله خرطة; born 26 July 1986 in Sète, France) is a French-born Algerian table tennis player. As of February 2013, Khourta is ranked no. 522 in the world by the International Table Tennis Federation (ITTF). Khourta is a member of the table tennis team for Fréjus Sports Club, and is coached and trained by Eric Angles. He is also left-handed, and uses the classic grip and Yasaka Offensif 40 blade.

Representing his adopted nation Algeria, Khourta qualified for the men's singles tournament at the 2008 Summer Olympics in Beijing, by receiving a place as one of the top 8 seeded players from the 2007 All-Africa Games in Algiers. He lost the preliminary round match to Australia's William Henzell, with a final set score of 1–4.
