= Han Xing =

Chinese-born Congolese table tennis player

Personal information
- Native name: 韓杏
- Nationality: Republic of the Congo
- Born: November 8, 1989 (age 36) Wuhan, Hubei, China
- Height: 165 cm (5.41 ft)
- Weight: 58 kg (128 lb)

Sport
- Sport: Table tennis
Medal record
Women's Table Tennis
Representing Republic of the Congo
All-Africa Games
Gold medal – first place	2015 Brazzaville	Doubles
Bronze medal – third place	2011 Maputo	Singles
Bronze medal – third place	2011 Maputo	Doubles
Bronze medal – third place	2011 Maputo	Team
Bronze medal – third place	2015 Brazzaville	Singles
Bronze medal – third place	2015 Brazzaville	Team

Han Xing (Chinese: 韓杏; born 8 November 1989) is a Chinese-born Congolese table tennis player. She competed for Congo at the 2012 Summer Olympics and the 2016 Rio Olympics.
