= Wang Jianan (table tennis) =

Chinese-born Congolese table tennis player

Personal information
- Native name: 汪佳男
- Nationality: Republic of the Congo
- Born: 20 January 1983 (age 43) Baoding, Hebei, China
- Height: 177 cm (5 ft 10 in)
- Weight: 77 kg (170 lb)

Sport
- Sport: Table tennis
Medal record
Men's Table Tennis
Representing Republic of the Congo
African Games
| Gold medal – first place | 2015 Brazzaville | Doubles |
| Gold medal – first place | 2015 Brazzaville | Mixed Doubles |
| Bronze medal – third place | 2015 Brazzaville | Singles |
| Bronze medal – third place | 2015 Brazzaville | Team |

Wang Jianan (born 20 January 1983) is a Chinese-born Congolese table tennis player. At the 2016 Summer Olympics he competed in the Men's singles.
