= Suraju Saka =

Congolese table tennis player (born 1976)

Personal information
- Nationality: Republic of the Congo
- Born: 5 May 1976 (age 50) Nigeria
- Height: 183 cm (6 ft 0 in)

Sport
- Sport: Table Tennis
Medal record
Men's Table Tennis
Representing Republic of the Congo
All-Africa Games
Silver medal – second place	2015 Brazzaville	Doubles
Bronze medal – third place	2011 Maputo	Doubles
Bronze medal – third place	2015 Brazzaville	Team
Jeux de la Francophonie
Bronze medal – third place	2009 Beirut	Singles

Suraju Saka (born 5 May 1976, in Nigeria) is a Nigerian table tennis player. He competed at the 2012 Summer Olympics in the Men's singles, but was defeated in the first round. He also went out in the first round at the 2008 Summer Olympics.

Suraju is distinct on the African Table Tennis Scene as the only Male Singles player since 1968 to win the African Table Tennis Championships not representing either Egypt or Nigeria, having won the 2008 Championships representing Republic of the Congo.
