= Farah Abdelaziz =

Egyptian table tennis player

Personal information
- Born: 1 September 1992 (age 34) Cairo, Egypt

Sport
- Country: Egypt
- Sport: Table tennis
Medal record
Women's table tennis
Representing Egypt
African Games
Gold medal – first place	2015 Brazzaville	Team
Gold medal – first place	2019 Rabat	Team
Silver medal – second place	2019 Rabat	Mixed doubles
Bronze medal – third place	2015 Brazzaville	Mixed doubles
Bronze medal – third place	2019 Rabat	Singles
Mediterranean Games
Gold medal – first place	2026 Taranto	Team

Farah Abdelaziz (Arabic: فرح•عبد العزيز,) born 1 September 1992, is an Egyptian table tennis player. She competed in the women's team event at the 2020 Summer Olympics.
