= Yousra Abdel Razek =

Egyptian table tennis player (born 1995)

Yossra Ashraf Helmy
Personal information
- Born: 3 December 1995 (age 30) Cairo, Egypt
- Years active: 2006-
- Parents: Nihal Meshref; Ashraf Helmy

Sport
- Country: Egypt
- Sport: Table tennis
- Highest ranking: 44 (1 July 2023)
- Current ranking: 88 (15 July 2025)
Medal record
Women's table tennis
Representing Egypt
African Games
Gold medal – first place	2015 Brazzaville	Team
Gold medal – first place	2019 Rabat	Team
Gold medal – first place	2023 Accra	Team
Bronze medal – third place	2019 Rabat	Doubles
African Championships
Gold medal – first place	2024 Addis Ababa	Team
Bronze medal – third place	2024 Addis Ababa	Singles

Yousra Abdel Razek (born 3 December 1995, in Cairo), also known as Yousra Helmy, is an Egyptian table tennis player. She competed at the 2016 Summer Olympics as part of the Egyptian team in the women's team event. The team lost to Singapore in the first round.

She qualified to represent Egypt at the 2020 Summer Olympics where she played in 2 events, singles and women's teams.

She is the daughter of Olympic table tennis players Ashraf Helmy and Nihal Meshref.
