= Dina Meshref =

Egyptian table tennis player

Personal information
- Native name: دينا علاء مشرف
- Full name: Dina Alaa Meshref
- Nationality: Egypt
- Born: 10 March 1994 (age 32) Quebec City, Quebec, Canada
- Height: 166 cm (5 ft 5 in)
- Weight: 57 kg (126 lb)

Sport
- Country: Egypt
- Sport: Table Tennis
- Club: (Egypt) Al Ahly
- Highest ranking: 21 (28 August 2023)
- Current ranking: 30 (28 September 2026)
Medal record
Women's table tennis
Representing Egypt
African Games
Gold medal – first place	2011 Maputo	Team
Gold medal – first place	2015 Brazzaville	Singles
Gold medal – first place	2015 Brazzaville	Team
Gold medal – first place	2019 Rabat	Singles
Gold medal – first place	2019 Rabat	Team
Gold medal – first place	2019 Rabat	Mixed Doubles
Gold medal – first place	2023 Accra	Team
Silver medal – second place	2015 Brazzaville	Doubles
Silver medal – second place	2023 Accra	Singles
Bronze medal – third place	2011 Maputo	Doubles
Bronze medal – third place	2011 Maputo	Mixed Doubles
Bronze medal – third place	2015 Brazzaville	Mixed Doubles
Bronze medal – third place	2019 Rabat	Doubles
African Championships
Gold medal – first place	2012 Cairo	Doubles
Gold medal – first place	2012 Cairo	Mixed Doubles
Gold medal – first place	2012 Cairo	Team
Gold medal – first place	2015 Cairo	Singles
Gold medal – first place	2015 Cairo	Mixed Doubles
Gold medal – first place	2015 Cairo	Team
Gold medal – first place	2016 Agadir	Doubles
Gold medal – first place	2016 Agadir	Mixed Doubles
Gold medal – first place	2016 Agadir	Team
Gold medal – first place	2018 Port Louis	Singles
Gold medal – first place	2018 Port Louis	Mixed Doubles
Gold medal – first place	2018 Port Louis	Team
Gold medal – first place	2021 Yaoundé	Mixed Doubles
Gold medal – first place	2021 Yaoundé	Team
Gold medal – first place	2022 Algiers	Singles
Gold medal – first place	2022 Algiers	Team
Gold medal – first place	2023 Rades	Mixed Doubles
Gold medal – first place	2023 Rades	Team
Gold medal – first place	2025 Tunis	Doubles
Gold medal – first place	2025 Tunis	Team
Silver medal – second place	2015 Cairo	Doubles
Bronze medal – third place	2012 Cairo	Singles
Africa Cup
Gold medal – first place	2014 Lagos	Singles
Bronze medal – third place	2013 Oyo	Singles
Mediterranean Games
Gold medal – first place	2018 Tarragona	Singles
Gold medal – first place	2022 Oran	Team
Gold medal – first place	2026 Taranto	Team
Bronze medal – third place	2013 Mersin	Team
Pan Arab Games
Gold medal – first place	2011 Doha	Singles
Gold medal – first place	2011 Doha	Doubles
Gold medal – first place	2011 Doha	Team

Dina Alaa Meshref (Egyptian Arabic: دينا علاء مشرف; born 10 March 1994 in Quebec City) is an Egyptian table tennis player. She reached a career-high singles ranking of world No. 21 in the ITTF/WTT. She is currently ranked the No. 2 female table tennis player in Africa. She represented Egypt in the 2012 Summer Olympics, 2016 Summer Olympics, and 2020 Summer Olympics.

Meshref attended Futures American School and Roots School and graduated from the American University in Cairo.

Meshref comes from a family of table tennis players. Both her parents were national champions. She won her first African Cup title in 2011 before claiming seven consecutive titles between 2014 and 2020.

She won her latest African title in September 2022, climbing 21 spots in the table tennis world ranking to reach the rank of 29.

Dina, was a gold medalist in women's singles at the 2018 Mediterranean Games and a gold medalist in women's teams at the 2022 Mediterranean Games.

She reached her highest ITTF ranking of #26 in April 2023.

On 10 August 2022 she signed to the Greek club Panathinaikos, competing in the European Champions League.
