= Offiong Edem =

Nigerian table tennis player (born 1986)

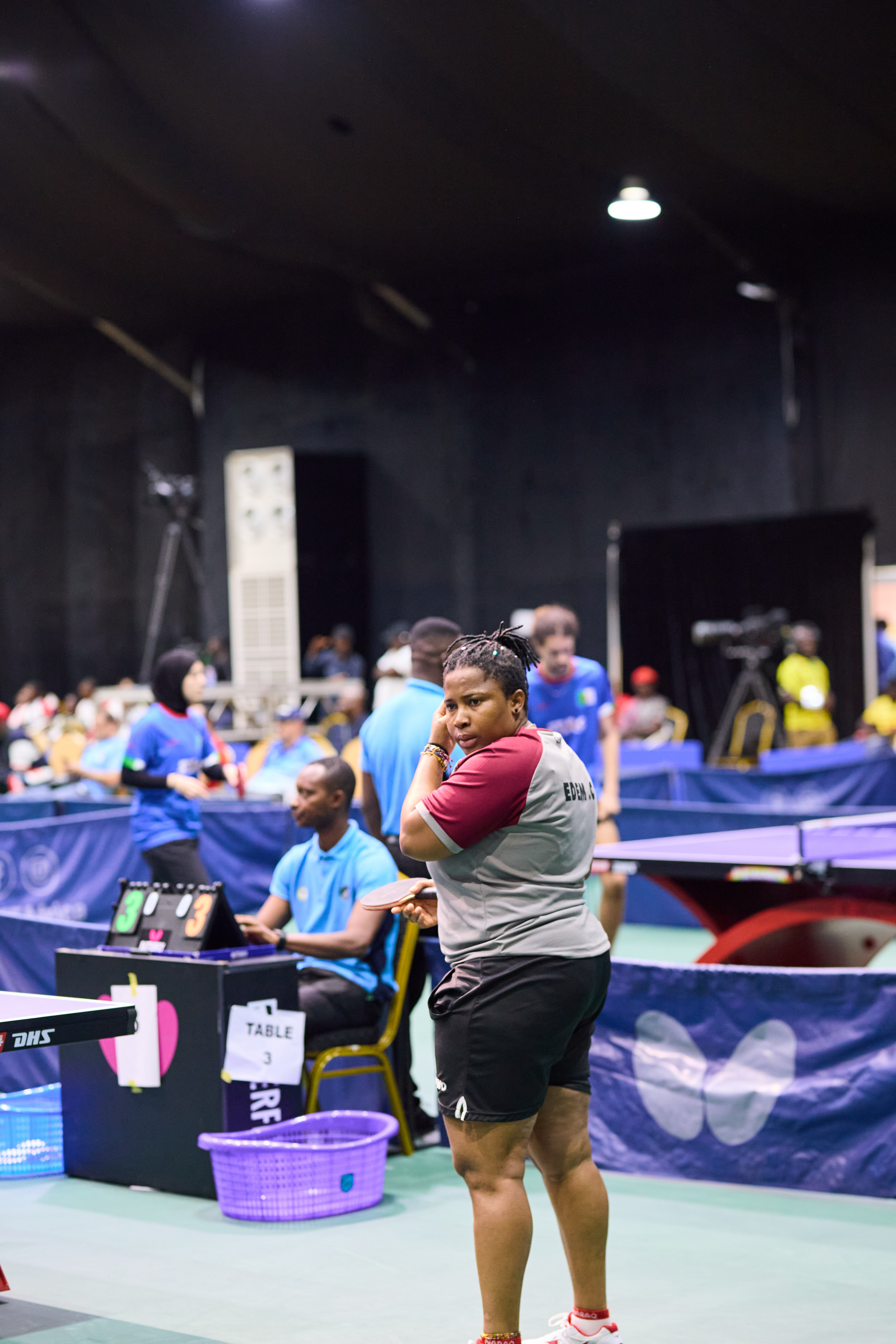

Personal information
- Nationality: Nigeria
- Born: 31 December 1986 (age 39) Calabar, Nigeria
- Occupation: Sports
- Years active: 20 years
- Height: 170 cm (5 ft 7 in)
- Weight: 64 kg (141 lb)
- Website: offiongedemfoundation

Sport
- Country: Nigeria
- Sport: Table Tennis
- Rank: 89
- League: Spanish super League

Achievements and titles
- Highest world ranking: 89
Medal record
Women's table tennis
Representing Nigeria
African Games
Gold medal – first place	2007 Algiers	Doubles
Gold medal – first place	2007 Algiers	Team
Gold medal – first place	2011 Maputo	Singles
Gold medal – first place	2011 Maputo	Doubles
Gold medal – first place	2011 Maputo	Mixed Doubles
Gold medal – first place	2019 Rabat	Doubles
Silver medal – second place	2011 Maputo	Team
Silver medal – second place	2015 Brazzaville	Team
Silver medal – second place	2019 Rabat	Team
Silver medal – second place	2023 Accra	Team
Bronze medal – third place	2015 Brazzaville	Doubles
Bronze medal – third place	2019 Rabat	Singles
Bronze medal – third place	2019 Rabat	Mixed Doubles
Bronze medal – third place	2023 Accra	Singles
Bronze medal – third place	2023 Accra	Doubles

Offiong Edem (born 31 December 1986 in Calabar) is a Nigerian table tennis player. She competed for Nigeria at the 2004, 2012, 2016, and 2020 Summer Olympics.
