= Nadeen El-Dawlatly =

Egyptian table tennis player

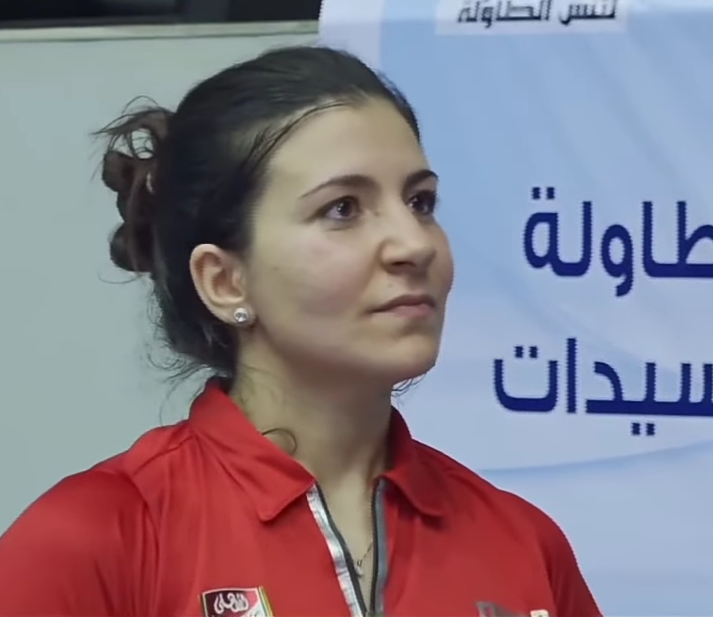

Personal information
- Full name: Nadeen Ahmed Ali El-Dawlatly
- Nickname: Nanno
- Nationality: Egypt
- Born: 22 June 1993 (age 33) Doha, Qatar
- Height: 1.62 m (5 ft 4 in)
- Weight: 57 kg (126 lb; 9.0 st)

Sport
- Sport: Table tennis
- Club: Ahly Club, Cairo
- Playing style: Shakehand, Offensive
- Equipment: TIBHAR
- Highest ranking: 250 (October 2011)
Medal record
Table Tennis
Representing Egypt
African Junior Table Tennis Championships
Gold medal – first place	2010 Oyo	Girls Singles
Gold medal – first place	2010 Oyo	Girls Doubles
Gold medal – first place	2010 Oyo	Girls Team
African U21 Championships
Gold medal – first place	2011 Rabat	Girls Singles
Gold medal – first place	2011 Rabat	Girls Doubles
Gold medal – first place	2011 Rabat	Mixed Doubles
All Africa Games
Gold medal – first place	2011 Maputo	Team
Gold medal – first place	2015 Brazzaville	Team
Silver medal – second place	2015 Brazzaville	Singles
Silver medal – second place	2015 Brazzaville	Doubles
Bronze medal – third place	2011 Maputo	Doubles
Bronze medal – third place	2011 Maputo	Doubles
Pan Arab Games
Gold medal – first place	2011 Doha	Women's Doubles
Gold medal – first place	2011 Doha	Women's Team
Silver medal – second place	2011 Doha	Women's Singles

Nadeen El-Dawlatly (born 22 June 1993 in Doha, Qatar) is an Egyptian table tennis player. She plays for El-Ahly Club in Cairo. She qualified for the London 2012 Olympic Games with her result at the 2011 All-Africa Games.

== Personal life ==
El-Dawlatly was born into a table tennis family. Both her parents and her siblings were successful table tennis players. She began playing aged 7 at the Ahly Club Table Tennis School under the supervision of her father.

== Career record ==
=== African Junior Table Tennis Championships ===
(gold) 2010 Oyo: Girls Singles, Girls Doubles, Girls Team

=== African U21 Championships ===
(gold) 2011 Rabat: Girls Singles, Girls Doubles, Mixed Doubles

=== All Africa Games ===
(gold) 2011 Maputo: Women's Team
(bronze) 2011 Maputo: Women's Singles, Doubles, Mixed Doubles
