= El-sayed Lashin =

Egyptian table tennis player

El-Sayed Lashin
Personal information
- Nationality: Egypt
- Born: 9 February 1980 (age 46) Alexandria, Egypt
- Height: 1.76 m (5 ft 9 in)
- Weight: 83 kg (183 lb; 13.1 st)

Sport
- Sport: Table tennis
- Club: Sporting Elahly
- Playing style: Shakehand, Offensive
- Highest ranking: 76 (April 2013)
Medal record
Men's Table Tennis
Representing Egypt
African Championships
| Gold medal – first place | 1996 Nairobi | Men's Team |
| Gold medal – first place | 1998 Port Louis | Men's Team |
| Gold medal – first place | 2000 Addis Abeba | Men's Team |
| Gold medal – first place | 2002 Bizerte | Men's Doubles |
| Gold medal – first place | 2002 Bizerte | Men's Team |
| Gold medal – first place | 2004 Mauritius | Men's Doubles |
| Gold medal – first place | 2004 Mauritius | Men's Team |
| Gold medal – first place | 2007 Brazzaville | Men's Doubles |
| Gold medal – first place | 2007 Brazzaville | Men's Team |
| Silver medal – second place | 1998 Port Louis | Men's Singles |
| Silver medal – second place | 1998 Port Louis | Men's Doubles |
| Silver medal – second place | 2000 Addis Abeba | Men's Singles |
| Silver medal – second place | 2000 Addis Abeba | Men's Doubles |
| Silver medal – second place | 2000 Addis Abeba | Mixed Doubles |
| Silver medal – second place | 2004 Mauritius | Men's Singles |
| Silver medal – second place | 2004 Mauritius | Mixed Doubles |
| Silver medal – second place | 2007 Brazzaville | Men's Singles |
| Bronze medal – third place | 1996 Nairobi | Men's Doubles |
| Bronze medal – third place | 1998 Port Louis | Mixed Doubles |
| Bronze medal – third place | 2007 Brazzaville | Mixed Doubles |
African Games
| Gold medal – first place | 2007 Algeria | Men's Team |
| Gold medal – first place | 2011 Malputo | Men's Doubles |
| Gold medal – first place | 2011 Malputo | Men's Team |
| Silver medal – second place | 1999 Johannesburg | Men's Singles |
| Silver medal – second place | 1999 Johannesburg | Men's Team |
| Silver medal – second place | 2003 Abuja | Men's Singles |
| Silver medal – second place | 2003 Abuja | Men's Doubles |
| Silver medal – second place | 2003 Abuja | Men's Team |
| Silver medal – second place | 2007 Algeria | Men's Doubles |
| Silver medal – second place | 2011 Malputo | Men's Singles |
| Bronze medal – third place | 1999 Johannesburg | Men's Doubles |
| Bronze medal – third place | 1999 Johannesburg | Mixed Doubles |
| Bronze medal – third place | 2007 Malputo | Men's Singles |
| Bronze medal – third place | 2011 Malputo | Mixed Doubles |
| Bronze medal – third place | 2015 Brazzaville | Men's Doubles |
Arab Championships
| Gold medal – first place | 2000 Damascus | Men's Doubles |
| Gold medal – first place | 2000 Damascus | Men's Team |
| Gold medal – first place | 2002 Amman | Men's Doubles |
| Gold medal – first place | 2002 Amman | Mixed Doubles |
| Gold medal – first place | 2002 Amman | Men's Team |
| Gold medal – first place | 2004 Bizerk | Men's Team |
| Gold medal – first place | 2008 Rabat | Men's Team |
| Gold medal – first place | 2010 Um Al Hassam | Men's Team |
| Silver medal – second place | 1998 Casablanca | Mixed Doubles |
| Silver medal – second place | 2002 Amman | Men's Singles |
| Bronze medal – third place | 2000 Damascus | Men's Singles |
Pan Arab Games
| Gold medal – first place | 2011 Doha | Men's Singles |
| Gold medal – first place | 2011 Doha | Men's Doubles |
| Gold medal – first place | 2011 Doha | Men's Team |

El-Sayed Lashin (born 9 February 1980 in Alexandria, Egypt) is an Egyptian table tennis player. His current club is Al Ahly in Cairo, where he resides. He qualified for his third Olympic Games at the All Africa Games held in September 2011 in Maputo, Mozambique. He has won nine gold medals in African Championships from 1996 to 2007 and three gold medals in African Games from 2007 till 2011.

== General interest ==
Lashin has been playing table tennis since he was eleven years old. He initially only accompanied his brother but soon discovered that he liked playing. He holds a Bachelor's degree in Logistics from the Arab Academy for Science and Technology and Maritime Transport.

== Career ==
Having made his international debut in 1997, Lashin competed for Egypt at several Continental Championships, All African Games and Olympic Games. He is a two times winner of the Francophone Games and a three times winner of the African Cup.

=== Major League Table Tennis ===
In 2023, Lashin was selected as a second-round draft pick for the Bay Area Blasters in the inaugural Major League Table Tennis (MLTT) draft.

=== Season 1 and season 2 (2023–25) ===
During the 2023–24 season, Lashin was part of the roster that led the Blasters to a first-place finish in the West Division regular season with a 12–10 record. In Season 2 (2024–25), the Blasters finished second in the West Division and qualified for the postseason. During the bronze medal match against the Carolina Gold Rush in Philadelphia, Lashin secured the final point for the Blasters to clinch third place overall in the league Championship.

=== Season 3 (2025–26) ===
Lashin achieved multiple individual honors during the 2025–26 season. He was named the inaugural MLTT Men's Player of the Week for Week 1 after a strong opening performance in Pleasanton, California.

In November 2025, Lashin earned his second Men's Player of the Week award for Week 6. During that weekend, he won six of his nine singles matches, including victories over top-ranked opponents such as Benedek Olah, Emmanuel Lebesson, and Kayama Yu. His performance elevated him to No. 5 in the official MLTT player power rankings. By February 2026, he remained a key contributor to the Blasters' position as the third seed in the West Division playoff race.

== Career records ==
=== African Championships ===
(gold) Men's Team: 2007 Brazzaville, 2004, Mauritius, 2002 Amman, 2000 Damascus, 1998 Port Louis, 1996 Nairobi

(gold) Men's Doubles: 2007 Brazzaville, 2004, Mauritius, 2002 Amman

(silver) Men's Singles:2007 Brazzaville, 2000 Damascus, 1998 Port Louis

(silver) Men's Doubles: 2000 Damascus, 1998 Port Louis

(silver) Mixed Doubles: 2004 Mauritius, 2000 Damascus

(bronze) Men's Doubles: 1996 Nairobi

(bronze) Mixed Doubles: 2007 Brazzaville, 1998 Port Louis

=== African Cup ===
(gold) 2002 Johannesburg, 1999 Nairobi, 1998 Cairo

(silver) 2011 and 2009, Rabat

(bronze) 2001 El Minia, 1997 Port Elizabeth

=== African Games ===
(gold) Men's Team: 2011 Malputo, 2007 Algeria

(gold) Men's Doubles: 2011 Malputo

(silver) Men's Team: 2003 Abuja, 1999 Johannesburg

(silver) Men's Singles: 2011 Malputo, 2003 Abuja, 1999 Johannesburg

(silver) Men's Doubles: 2007 Algeria, 2003 Abuja

(bronze) Men's Singles: 2007 Algeria

(bronze) Men's Doubles: 1999 Johannesburg

(bronze) Mixed Doubles: 2011 Malputo, 1999 Johannesburg

=== Arab Championships ===
(gold) Men's Team: 2010 Um Al Hassam, 2008 Rabat, 2004 Bizerk, 2002 Amman, 2000 Damascus

(gold) Men's Doubles: 2002 Amman, 2000 Damascus

(gold) Mixed Doubles: 2002 Amman

(silver) Men's Singles: 2002 Amman

(silver) Mixed Doubles: 1998 Casablanca

(bronze) Men's Singles: 2000 Damascus

=== Arab Cup ===
(gold) Men's Singles: 2007 Sanaa, 2003 Sanaa, 2001 Sussa

(gold) Men's Doubles: 2009 Cairo, 2007 Sanaa, 2005 Beirut, 2001 Sussa

(silver) Men's Singles: 2005 Beirut

=== ITTF Pro Tour ===
Winner Doubles: 2010 Morocco Open

SF Singles: 2010 Morocco Open, 2010 Egypt Open, 2009 Morocco Open

SF Doubles: 2011 Morocco Open

QF Singles: 2011 Morocco Open

QF Doubles: 2009 Kuwait Open, 1998 Lebanon Open
