= Lynda Loghraibi =

Algerian table tennis player

Personal information
- Nationality: Algeria
- Born: 3 May 1997 (age 29) Hammamet, Tunisia

Sport
- Sport: Table tennis

Lynda Loghraibi (born 3 May 1997) is a table tennis player. Born in Tunisia, she represents Algeria internationally. She competed in the women's singles event at the 2024 Summer Olympics, where she lost in the Round of 64 to Chen Meng.
