= Segun Toriola =

Nigerian table tennis player (born 1974)

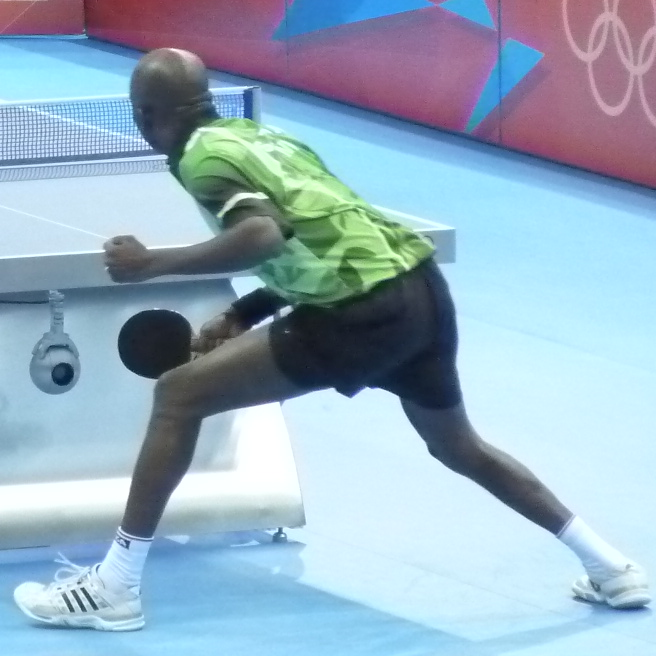
- Toriola in London, 2012

Personal information
- Full name: Segun Moses Toriola
- Nationality: Nigeria
- Born: 18 September 1974 (50 years old) Ilorin, Nigeria

Sport
- Sport: Table tennis
Medal record
Men's table tennis
Representing Nigeria
All-Africa Games
Gold medal – first place	1995 Harare	Singles
Gold medal – first place	1995 Harare	Doubles
Gold medal – first place	1995 Harare	Team
Gold medal – first place	1999 Johannesburg	Singles
Gold medal – first place	1999 Johannesburg	Doubles
Gold medal – first place	1999 Johannesburg	Mixed Doubles
Gold medal – first place	1999 Johannesburg	Team
Gold medal – first place	2003 Abuja	Singles
Gold medal – first place	2003 Abuja	Doubles
Gold medal – first place	2003 Abuja	Team
Gold medal – first place	2007 Algiers	Singles
Gold medal – first place	2007 Algiers	Doubles
Gold medal – first place	2011 Maputo	Mixed Doubles
Silver medal – second place	2003 Abuja	Mixed Doubles
Silver medal – second place	2007 Algiers	Team
Silver medal – second place	2011 Maputo	Team
Bronze medal – third place	2011 Maputo	Doubles
Commonwealth Games
Gold medal – first place	2002 Manchester	Singles
Gold medal – first place	2006 Melbourne	Doubles
Bronze medal – third place	2002 Manchester	Team
Bronze medal – third place	2006 Melbourne	Singles
Bronze medal – third place	2006 Melbourne	Team
African Championships
Gold medal – first place	1992 Lagos	Doubles
Gold medal – first place	1992 Lagos	Mixed Doubles
Gold medal – first place	1992 Lagos	Team
Gold medal – first place	1994 Cairo	Doubles
Gold medal – first place	1994 Cairo	Team
Gold medal – first place	1998 Port Louis	Singles
Gold medal – first place	2002 Bizerte	Singles
Gold medal – first place	2002 Bizerte	Mixed Doubles
Silver medal – second place	1992 Lagos	Singles
Silver medal – second place	1994 Cairo	Singles
Silver medal – second place	2002 Bizerte	Doubles
Silver medal – second place	2002 Bizerte	Team
Bronze medal – third place	1998 Port Louis	Doubles

Segun Moses Toriola (born 18 September 1974 in Ilorin, Kwara, Nigeria) is a retired Nigeria professional table tennis player.

== Biography ==
He is the youngest of nine brothers.

Since 1995, he had been ranked amongst the top table tennis players in Africa. Ranked number one in Africa from 1998 until June 2008, when Egyptian Eli Saleh Ahmed became the leading African table tennis player. However, since 2009, Toriola reclaimed his top position. He is known for his unusual style of forehand play. Although his footwork has been criticised, his topspin has caused upset when he has gone up against top world players.

During his career, he has won multiple medals in international singles tournaments. These achievements include:

- 4 African Table Tennis Singles Championships (1998, 2002, 2004, 2006) and 2 Doubles Championships (1994,1992)
- A Commonwealth Singles Championship (2002) in Manchester (United Kingdom)
- A Commonwealth Doubles Championship and Singles Bronze Medal (2006) in Melbourne (Australia)
- 4 All-Africa Games Singles Gold Medals (1995, 1999, 2003, 2007), 4 Doubles Gold Medals (1995, 1999, 2003, 2007), 1 Mixed Doubles Gold Medal (1999, with Bose Kaffo; they also won silver in 2003) and 3 Team Gold Medals (1995, 1999, 2003).

He represented Nigeria at seven Summer Olympics debuting at Barcelona. His most notable achievement at the Olympics has been reaching the Men's Singles 1/16 final at the 2008 Summer Olympics in Beijing, beating, amongst others, former world number 1 Jean-Michel Saive, as well as David Zhuang. His 1/32 match-up with Jean-Michel Saive was referred to as one of the highlights of the Men's Singles Tournament. He narrowly lost 4–3 to heavily favoured Oh Sang-Eun in the 1/16 final.

His fifth Olympic appearance in 2008 made him the first Nigerian man to appear at five Olympics. This feat was achieved four years earlier by sprinter Mary Onyali and also in 2008 by fellow table tennis player Bose Kaffo. By the end of the 2008 Summer Olympics, only thirteen table tennis players worldwide had appeared at least five Olympics. With his participation in 2012 Olympics in London he became the only Nigerian athlete to appear at six Olympics. He therefore joined João N'Tyamba of Angola and Maria Mutola of Mozambique as only third ever African athlete to compete in so many Summer Olympics.

Toriola competed in the 2018 IITF African-Cup, placing first in group 4, allowing him to qualify for the Quarter Finals. In the Quarter Finals, Toriola faced and was defeated by Congolese player Saheed Idowu (2-4) resulting in Toriola's elimination. In the placement rounds, Toriola defeated both Thameur Mamia (3-2) and Sami Kheroff (3-1) to finish the tournament at 5th place.

== See also ==
- List of table tennis players
- List of athletes with the most appearances at Olympic Games
