= Ahmed Saleh (table tennis) =

Egyptian table tennis player (born 1979)

Ahmed Saleh (born 14 November 1979) is an Egyptian table tennis player. He competed at the 2008 and 2012 Summer Olympics. At the 2008 Games he took part in the men's individual event, losing in the second round to Damien Éloi of France. At the 2012 Summer Olympics he competed in the men's team event.

2019 African Games

Ahmed Saleh competed in the 2019 African Games in Men's Singles, Men's Doubles, & Mixed Doubles.

In Men's Singles, Saleh defeated Kurt Lingeveldt (4-1) in the Round of 16 to advance to the Quarterfinals. He was then eliminated by eventual winner Olajide Omotayo in a close match, losing 6–11 in the seventh set.

In Men's Doubles, the Egyptian Team of Ahmed Saleh & El-Beialy finished 2nd.

In Mixed Doubles, Saleh again teamed with a fellow Egyptian in Farah Abel-Aziz. They captured the silver medals.

WTT Macao 2020

On 29 November 2020, Saleh competed in an invite only commercial Table Tennis Tournament in Macau, China known as WTT Macao. He entered the tournament unseeded and as a result had to play a qualifier on Day One against Wong Chun Ting. Wong defeated Saleh in a very exciting match (2-3). For his participation in the tournament, Saleh was awarded US$15,000.
