= Olufunke Oshonaike =

Professional Nigeria Table Tennis Player based in Hamburg, Germany

Olufunke Oshonaike OLY
Personal information
- Nationality: Nigeria
- Born: 28 April 1974 (age 52) Lagos, Nigeria
- Height: 167 cm (5 ft 6 in)
- Weight: 59 kg (130 lb)

Sport
- Sport: Table Tennis
Medal record
Women's Table Tennis
Representing Nigeria
All-Africa Games
Gold medal – first place	2007 Algiers	Team
Silver medal – second place	2011 Maputo	Singles
Silver medal – second place	2011 Maputo	Doubles
Silver medal – second place	2011 Maputo	Mixed Doubles
Silver medal – second place	2011 Maputo	Team
Silver medal – second place	2015 Brazzaville	Team
Silver medal – second place	2015 Brazzaville	Mixed Doubles
Bronze medal – third place	2007 Algiers	Singles
Bronze medal – third place	2007 Algiers	Doubles
Bronze medal – third place	2015 Brazzaville	Singles
Bronze medal – third place	2015 Brazzaville	Doubles

Olufunke Oshonaike, also known as Funke Oshonaike (born 28 April 1974) is a Nigerian professional table tennis player based in Hamburg, Germany.

Oshonaike started her playing career in the early 1980s, when she was very young, on Akeju Street in Shomolu, Lagos.

She attended Community Primary School, now known as Ola-Olu Primary School, Agunbiade, Shomolu, Lagos. In primary 4, she won a school competition and was honoured by the Headmaster, Mr G.O. Taiwo, on the assembly ground in front of her schoolmates.

After her primary education, she attended Igbobi Girls High School, Igbobi-Yaba; she left the school after completing SSCE to pursue her education at the University of Lagos, where she bagged a Diploma in Physical Education and thereafter pursued a professional career in Table Tennis abroad.

At the 2016 Summer Olympics in Rio de Janeiro, Oshonaike competed in the women's single division. In the preliminary round, she defeated Mariana Sahakian of Lebanon. In round 1, she was defeated by Adriana Diaz of Puerto Rico. She was the flagbearer for Nigeria during the Parade of Nations.

She competed in the women's singles at the 2020 Summer Olympics. for the 7th time having previously qualified and participated in Atlanta 1996, Sydney 2000, Athens 2004, Beijing 2008, London 2012 and Rio 2016.

Olympic Games
Preceded by Sinivie Boltic	Flagbearer for Nigeria; Rio de Janeiro 2016	Succeeded by Ngozi Onwumere
