= African Table Tennis Championships =

Annual table tennis tournament

- Most recent season or competition: 2026 African Table Tennis Championships
- Sport: Table tennis
- First season: 1962
- Confederation: Africa (ATTF)
- Website: africa.ittf.com

The African Table tennis Championships is a tournament organized by the African Table Tennis Federation (ATTF) to crown the best table tennis players in Africa. For the Team event there is the African Table tennis Team Championships. This is not to be confused with the African Games, the multi sports event, held every four years where table tennis is included since 1973.

== Previous winners ==
Year	City	Team		Singles		Doubles		
Year	City	Men	Women	Men	Women	Men	Women	Mixed
1962	(Egypt) Alexandria	Egypt	Egypt	(Ghana) Emmanuel Quaye	(Egypt) Ines El-Darwish	(Egypt) Fawzi El-Abrashy (Egypt) Adel Fahmy	(Egypt) Perihan El-Bakri (Egypt) Ines El-Darwish	(Egypt) Mamdouh Salama (Egypt) Naila Naser
1964	(Ghana) Accra	Egypt	Egypt	(Egypt) Galal Ezz	(Ghana) Ethel Jacks	(Egypt) Fawzi El-Abrashy (Egypt) Monir El-Kirdani	(Ghana) Ernestina Akuetteh (Ghana) Ethel Jacks	(Egypt) Galal Ezz (Egypt) Ines El-Darwish
1968	(Nigeria) Lagos	Nigeria	Egypt	(Ghana) Emmanuel Quaye	(Ghana) Ethel Jacks	(Nigeria) Waidi Dawodou (Nigeria) Muyiwa Oni	(Ghana) Ernestina Akuetteh (Ghana) Ethel Jacks	(Egypt) Hosni Sonbol (Egypt) Ines El-Darwish
1974	(Egypt) Alexandria	Nigeria	Nigeria	(Egypt) Farouk El-Kabbany	(Ghana) Ethel Jacks	(Egypt) Galal Ezz (Egypt) Hosni Sonbol	(Egypt) Nahed Kamal (Egypt) Randa Tawfic	(Egypt) Ahmed Dawlatly (Egypt) Ingi Fahmy
1976	(Benin) Cotonou	Nigeria	Nigeria	(Nigeria) Kasali Lasis	(Nigeria) Olawunmi Majekodunmi	(Egypt) Galal Ezz (Egypt) Hosni Sonbol	(Ghana) Ethel Jacks (Nigeria) Olawunmi Majekodunmi	(Nigeria) Kasali Lasisi (Nigeria) Olawunmi Majekodunmi
1980	(Senegal) Dakar	Nigeria	Nigeria	(Nigeria) Sunday Eboh	(Ghana) Esther Lamptey	(Nigeria) Sunday Eboh (Nigeria) Francis Sule	(Nigeria) Mojisola Kuye (Nigeria) Olawunmi Majekodunmi	(Nigeria) Sunday Eboh (Nigeria) Mojisola Kuye
1985	(Egypt) Alexandria	Nigeria	Nigeria	(Nigeria) Atanda Musa	(Nigeria) Olawunmi Majekodunmi	(Nigeria) Abiono (Nigeria) Thomas Ogunrinde	(Nigeria) Olawunmi Majekodunmi (Nigeria) Kubrat Owolabi	(Nigeria) Atanda Musa (Nigeria) Olawunmi Majekodunmi
1988	(Nigeria) Lagos	Nigeria	Nigeria	(Nigeria) Atanda Musa	(Nigeria) Kubrat Owolabi	(Nigeria) Gbenga Akinola (Nigeria) Sule Olaleye	(Nigeria) Bose Kaffo (Nigeria) Kubrat Owolabi	(Nigeria) Titus Omotara (Nigeria) Bose Kaffo
1990	(Morocco) Casablanca	Nigeria	Egypt	(Egypt) Adel Massaad	(Nigeria) Bose Kaffo	(Nigeria) Atanda Musa (Nigeria) Ahmed Wahab	(Nigeria) Abiola Odumosu (Nigeria) Olufunke Oshonaike	(Egypt) Ashraf Helmy (Egypt) Nihal Meshref
1992	(Nigeria) Lagos	Nigeria	Nigeria	(Egypt) Ashraf Helmy	(Nigeria) Olufunke Oshonaike	(Nigeria) Kazeem Nosiru (Nigeria) Segun Toriola	(Nigeria) Iyabo Akanmu (Nigeria) Kehinde Okenla	(Nigeria) Segun Toriola (Nigeria) Abiola Odumosu
1994	(Egypt) Cairo	Nigeria	Nigeria	(Nigeria) Sule Olaleye	(Nigeria) Bose Kaffo	(Nigeria) Adeyemo Fatai (Nigeria) Segun Toriola	(Egypt) Gihan El-Sayed (Egypt) Nihal Meshref	(Nigeria) Sule Olaleye (Nigeria) Bose Kaffo
1996	(Kenya) Nairobi	Egypt	Egypt	(Nigeria) Kazeem Nosiru	(Nigeria) Bimbo Owopetu	(Egypt) Sherif Diaa (Egypt) Ashraf Sobhy	(Egypt) Shaimaa Abdul-Aziz (Egypt) Bacent Osman	(Nigeria) Ufo Obiomo (Nigeria) Atisi Owoh
1998	(Mauritius) Port Louis	Egypt	Egypt	(Nigeria) Segun Toriola	(Nigeria) Bose Kaffo	(Egypt) Ashraf Helmy (Egypt) Ahmed Saleh	(Nigeria) Bose Kaffo (Nigeria) Atisi Owoh	(Egypt) Ahmed Saleh (Egypt) Gihan El-Sayed
2000	(Ethiopia) Addis Ababa	Egypt	Egypt	(Egypt) Ahmed Saleh	(Egypt) Shahira El-Alfy	(Egypt) Emad Moselhy (Egypt) Ahmed Saleh	(Ethiopia) Ahmed Nebiyat (Ethiopia) Alem Tadesse	(Egypt) Ahmed Saleh (Egypt) Shaimaa Abdul-Aziz
2002	(Tunisia) Bizerte	Egypt	Egypt	(Nigeria) Segun Toriola	(Nigeria) Olufunke Oshonaike	(Egypt) El-sayed Lashin (Egypt) Ahmed Saleh	(Egypt) Shaimaa Abdul-Aziz (Egypt) Bacent Osman	(Nigeria) Segun Toriola (Nigeria) Olufunke Oshonaike
2004	(Mauritius) Port Louis	Egypt	Egypt	(Egypt) Emad Moselhy	(Egypt) Bacent Osman	(Egypt) El-sayed Lashin (Egypt) Amr Reda	(Egypt) Ayatollah Ashraf (Egypt) Bacent Osman	(Egypt) Emad Moselhy (Egypt) Roaa Magdy
2007	(Republic of the Congo) Brazzaville	Egypt	Nigeria	(Egypt) Ahmed Saleh	(Republic of the Congo) Yang Fen	(Egypt) El-sayed Lashin (Egypt) Ahmed Saleh	(Nigeria) Cecilia Offiong (Nigeria) Offiong Edem	(Republic of the Congo) Suraju Saka (Republic of the Congo) Yang Fen
2008	(Democratic Republic of the Congo) Kinshasa	Nigeria	Republic of the Congo	(Republic of the Congo) Suraju Saka	(Republic of the Congo) Yang Fen	(South Africa) Theo Cogill (South Africa) Shane Overmeyer	(Republic of the Congo) Han Xing (Republic of the Congo) Yang Fen	(Republic of the Congo) Saheed Idowu (Republic of the Congo) Han Xing
2010	(Cameroon) Yaoundé	Egypt	Nigeria	(Egypt) Ahmed Saleh	(Cameroon) Sarah Hanffou	(Egypt) Omar Assar (Egypt) Emad Moselhy	(Egypt) Nadeen El-Dawlatly (Egypt) Sara El-Sokary	(Republic of the Congo) Suraju Saka (Republic of the Congo) Han Xing
2012	(Egypt) Cairo	Egypt	Egypt	(Egypt) El-sayed Lashin	(Republic of the Congo) Han Xing	(Egypt) El-sayed Lashin (Egypt) Ahmed Saleh	(Egypt) Nadeen El-Dawlatly (Egypt) Dina Meshref	(Egypt) Omar Assar (Egypt) Dina Meshref
2015	(Egypt) Cairo	Egypt	Egypt	(Egypt) Omar Assar	(Egypt) Dina Meshref	(Nigeria) Quadri Aruna (Nigeria) Makanjuola Kazeem	(Republic of the Congo) Han Xing (Republic of the Congo) Onyinyechi Nwachukwu	(Egypt) Omar Assar (Egypt) Dina Meshref
2016	(Morocco) Agadir	Egypt	Egypt	(Egypt) Omar Assar	(Nigeria) Olufunke Oshonaike	(Nigeria) Quadri Aruna (Nigeria) Segun Toriola	(Egypt) Yousra Abdel Razek (Egypt) Dina Meshref	(Egypt) Omar Assar (Egypt) Dina Meshref
2018	(Mauritius) Port Louis	Nigeria	Egypt	(Nigeria) Quadri Aruna	(Egypt) Dina Meshref	(Egypt) Assar Khalid (Egypt) Youssef Abdel-Aziz	(Egypt) Farah Abdel-Aziz (Egypt) Reem El-Eraky	(Egypt) Ahmed Saleh (Egypt) Dina Meshref
2021	(Cameroon) Yaoundé	Egypt	Egypt	(Egypt) Omar Assar	(Egypt) Mariam Alhodaby	(Nigeria) Quadri Aruna (Nigeria) Bode Abiodun	(Egypt) Yousra Abdel Razek (Egypt) Farah Abdelaziz	(Egypt) Omar Assar (Egypt) Dina Meshref
2022	(Algeria) Algiers	Egypt	Egypt	(Nigeria) Quadri Aruna	(Egypt) Dina Meshref	(Egypt) Mohamed Shouman (Egypt) Mohamed El-Beiali	(Egypt) Alaa Yehia (Egypt) Hana Goda	(Egypt) Mohamed El-Beiali (Egypt) Hana Goda
2023	(Tunisia) Rades	Egypt	Egypt	(Nigeria) Quadri Aruna	(Egypt) Hana Goda	(Madagascar) Antoine Razafinarivo (Madagascar) Fabio Rakotoarimanana	(Nigeria) Fatimo Bello (Nigeria) Olufunke Oshonaike	(Egypt) Omar Assar (Egypt) Dina Meshref
2024	(Ethiopia) Addis Ababa	Nigeria	Egypt	(Egypt) Omar Assar	(Egypt) Hana Goda	(Nigeria) Muizz Adegoke (Nigeria) Abdulbasit Abdulfatai	(Egypt) Hend Fathy (Egypt) Hana Goda	(Egypt) Youssef Abdel-Aziz (Egypt) Mariam Alhodaby
2025	(Tunisia) Tunis	Egypt	Egypt	(Egypt) Omar Assar	(Egypt) Hana Goda	(Egypt) Youssef Abdel-Aziz (Egypt) Mohamed El-Beiali	(Egypt) Hana Goda (Egypt) Dina Meshref	(Egypt) Youssef Abdel-Aziz (Egypt) Mariam Alhodaby
2026	(Morocco) Tangier	Egypt	Egypt					
