= Table tennis at the 2000 Summer Olympics – Women's doubles =

Table tennis at the Olympics

Table tennis – Women's doubles at the Games of the XXVII Olympiad
- Venue: State Sports Centre
- Date: 16 to 22 September 2000
- Competitors: 68 from 25 nations

Medalists
1st place, gold medalist(s)		Li Ju; Wang Nan	China
2nd place, silver medalist(s)		Sun Jin; Yang Ying	China
3rd place, bronze medalist(s)		Kim Moo-kyo; Ryu Ji-hae	South Korea

These are the results of the women's doubles competition, one of two events for female competitors in table tennis at the 2000 Summer Olympics in Sydney.

Among 34 entries, eight seeded pairs were allocated into the draw of knockout stage which started from the round of 16. The rest 26 pairs were reduced to 24 pairs by two knockout matches. 24 pairs competed in eight groups of three pairs per group. Winners of each group advanced to the knockout stage.

== Seeds ==
1. Li Ju / Wang Nan (CHN) (champions, gold medalists)
2. Sun Jin / Yang Ying (CHN) (final, silver medalists)
3. Chen Jing / Xu Jing (TPE) (first round)
4. Csilla Bátorfi / Krisztina Tóth (HUN) (semifinals, fourth place)
5. Kim Moo-kyo / Ryu Ji-hae (KOR) (semifinals, bronze medalists)
6. Lee Eun-sil / Suk Eun-mi (KOR) (quarterfinals)
7. Ni Xialian / Peggy Regenwetter (LUX) (first round)
8. Jing Junhong / Li Jiawei (SIN) (first round)

== Qualification round ==
The winners of each qualification match advanced to the group stage.

Pair 1	Pair 2
Shaimaa Abdul Aziz and Bacinte Osman (EGY) beat	Marisel Ramírez and Leticia Suárez (CUB)
Kehinde Okenla and Atisi Owoh (NGR) beat	Luisana Pérez and Fabiola Ramos (VEN)

== Group stage ==
=== Group A ===
Rank	Athlete	W	L	GW	GL	PW	PL	AUS	AUT	CAN
1	Miao Miao and Shirley Zhou (AUS)	2	0	4	2	118	101	X	2–1	2–1
2	Judith Herczig and Liu Jia (AUT)	1	1	3	3	105	107	1–2	X	2–1
3	Geng Lijuan and Marie-Christine Roussy (CAN)	0	2	2	4	99	114	1–2	1–2	X

=== Group B ===
Rank	Athlete	W	L	GW	GL	PW	PL	LTU	JPN	AUS
1	Rūta Paškauskienė and Jolanta Prūsienė (LTU)	2	0	4	0	86	67	X	2–0	2–0
2	Kazuko Naito and Rinko Sakata (JPN)	1	1	2	3	91	91	0–2	X	2–1
3	Lay Jian Fang and Stella Zhou (AUS)	0	2	1	4	84	103	0–2	1–2	X

=== Group C ===
Rank	Athlete	W	L	GW	GL	PW	PL	GER	USA	CAN
1	Qianhong Gotsch-He and Jie Schöpp (GER)	2	0	4	1	106	78	X	2–1	2–0
2	Gao Jun and Michelle Do (USA)	1	1	3	3	109	119	1–2	X	2–1
3	Xiao-Xiao Wang and Chris Xu (CAN)	0	2	1	4	82	100	0–2	1–2	X

=== Group D ===
Rank	Athlete	W	L	GW	GL	PW	PL	GER	NZL	USA
1	Elke Schall and Nicole Struse (GER)	2	0	4	1	99	77	X	2–1	2–0
2	Chunli Li and Karen Li (NZL)	1	1	3	2	92	81	1–2	X	2–0
3	Tawny Banh Thua and Jasna Rather (USA)	0	2	0	4	51	84	0–2	0–2	X

=== Group E ===
Rank	Athlete	W	L	GW	GL	PW	PL	ROU	RUS	NGR
1	Otilia Badescu and Mihaela Steff (ROU)	2	0	4	0	85	53	X	2–0	2–0
2	Oksana Fadeyeva and Galina Melnik (RUS)	1	1	2	2	72	72	0–2	X	2–0
3	Kehinde Okenla and Atisi Owoh (NGR)	0	2	0	4	52	84	0–2	0–2	X

=== Group F ===
Rank	Athlete	W	L	GW	GL	PW	PL	JPN	HKG	CHI
1	Ai Fujinuma and An Konishi (JPN)	2	0	4	2	113	106	X	2–1	2–1
2	Song Ah Sim and Wong Ching (HKG)	1	1	3	2	94	90	1–2	X	2–0
3	Silvia Morel and Sofija Tepes (CHI)	0	2	1	4	90	101	1–2	0–2	X

=== Group G ===
Rank	Athlete	W	L	GW	GL	PW	PL	CRO	TPE	NGR
1	Eldijana Bentsen and Tamara Boroš (CRO)	2	0	4	1	107	82	X	2–1	2–0
2	Tsui Hsiu-li and Yu Feng-yun (TPE)	1	1	3	2	95	97	1–2	X	2–0
3	Bose Kaffo and Olufunke Oshonaike (NGR)	0	2	0	4	61	84	0–2	0–2	X

=== Group H ===
Rank	Athlete	W	L	GW	GL	PW	PL	BLR	SWE	EGY
1	Tatyana Kostromina and Viktoria Pavlovich (BLR)	2	0	4	1	101	79	X	2–1	2–0
2	Asa Svensson and Marie Svensson (SWE)	1	1	3	2	101	84	1–2	X	2–0
3	Shaimaa Abdul-Aziz and Bacent Othman (EGY)	0	2	0	4	45	84	0–2	0–2	X

== Knockout stage ==
First round
1	Li J (CHN); Wang N (CHN)	21	21	21
E Schall (GER); N Struse (GER)	10	8	17
E Bentsen (CRO); T Boroš (CRO)	21	15	9	27	25
8	Jin J (SIN); Li J (SIN)	16	21	21	25	23
5	Kim M-k (KOR); Ryu J-h (KOR)	21	21	21
A Fujinuma (JPN); A Konishi (JPN)	13	11	5
O Badescu (ROU); M Steff (ROU)	21	23	22
3	Chen J (TPE); Xu J (TPE)	15	21	20
4	C Bátorfi (HUN); K Tóth (HUN)	21	21	21
Q Gotsch (GER); J Schöpp (GER)	16	16	19
T Kostromina (BLR); V Pavlovich (BLR)	4	14	15
6	Lee E-s (KOR); Suk E-m (KOR)	21	21	21
7	Ni X (LUX); P Regenwetter (LUX)	21	13	21	18	13
M Miao (AUS); S Zhou (AUS)	16	21	19	21	21
R Paškauskienė (LTU); J Prūsienė (LTU)	5	17	10
2	Sun J (CHN); Yang Y (CHN)	21	21	21

Quarterfinals
1	Li J (CHN); Wang N (CHN)	21	21	21	21
E Bentsen (CRO); T Boroš (CRO)	23	14	12	5
5	Kim M-k (KOR); Ryu J-h (KOR)	21	20	21	23	21
O Badescu (ROU); M Steff (ROU)	18	22	14	25	19
4	C Bátorfi (HUN); K Tóth (HUN)	21	21	23
6	Lee E-s (KOR); Suk E-m (KOR)	19	16	21
M Miao (AUS); S Zhou (AUS)	13	11	17
2	Sun J (CHN); Yang Y (CHN)	21	21	21

Semifinals
1	Li J (CHN); Wang N (CHN)	17	21	15	21	24
5	Kim M-k (KOR); Ryu J-h (KOR)	21	12	21	14	22
4	C Bátorfi (HUN); K Tóth (HUN)	21	18	14	17
2	Sun J (CHN); Yang Y (CHN)	17	21	21	21

Gold medal match
1	Li J (CHN); Wang N (CHN)	21	21	21
2	Sun J (CHN); Yang Y (CHN)	18	11	11
Bronze medal match
5	Kim M-k (KOR); Ryu J-h (KOR)	21	21	22	19	21
4	C Bátorfi (HUN); K Tóth (HUN)	18	19	24	21	19

== Competitors ==
Athlete	Nation	Eliminated
Judit Herczig; Liu Jia	Austria	Groups
Lijuan Geng; Marie-Christine Roussy	Canada	Groups
Kazuko Naito; Rinko Sakata	Japan	Groups
Lay Jian Fang; Stella Zhou	Australia	Groups
Gao Jun; Michelle Do	United States	Groups
Xiao-Xiao Wang; Chris Xu	Canada	Groups
Chunli Li; Karen Li	New Zealand	Groups
Tawny Banh Thua; Jasna Rather	United States	Groups
Oksana Fadeyeva; Galina Melnik	Russia	Groups
Kehinde Okenla; Atisi Owoh	Nigeria	Groups
Song Ah Sim; Song Ching	Hong Kong	Groups
Silvia Morel; Sofija Tepes	Chile	Groups
Tsui Hsiu-li; Yu Feng-yin	Chinese Taipei	Groups
Bose Kaffo; Olufunke Oshonaike	Nigeria	Groups
Asa Svensson; Marie Svensson	Sweden	Groups
Shaimaa Abdul-Aziz; Bacent Othman	Egypt	Groups
Elke Schall; Nicole Stuse	Germany	16
Jing Junhong; Li Jiawei	Singapore	16
Ai Fujinuma; An Konishi	Japan	16
Chen Jing; Xu Jing	Chinese Taipei	16
Qianhong Gotsch; Jie Schöpp	Germany	16
Tatyana Kostromina; Viktoria Pavlovich	Belarus	16
Ni Xialian; Peggy Regenwetter	Luxembourg	16
Rūta Paškauskienė; Jolanta Prüsienė	Lithuania	16
Eldjiana Bentsen; Tamara Boroš	Croatia	8
Otilia Badescu; Mihaela Steff	Romania	8
Lee Eun-Sil; Suk Eun-Mi	South Korea	8
Miao Miao; Shirley Zhou	Australia	8
Csilla Bátorfi; Krisztina Tóth	Hungary	4
Kim Moo-Kyo; Ryu Ji-Hae	South Korea	3
Sun Jin; Yang Ying	China	2
Li Ju; Wang Nan	China	1
