= ITTF Africa Cup =

Annual table tennis competition

- Most recent season or competition: 2026 ITTF Africa Cup
- Sport: Table tennis
- Singles entrants: 16 men; 16 women
- Confederation: ATTF
- Most recent champions: Men: (Egypt) Omar Assar; Women: (Egypt) Hana Goda
- Most titles: Men: (Egypt) Omar Assar (5); Women: (Egypt) Dina Meshref (8)

The ITTF AFRICA Cup is an annual table tennis competition held by the International Table Tennis Federation (ITTF) and the African Table Tennis Federation (ATTF). The competition features men's and women's singles events, with 16 players qualifying to take part in each event, subject to a maximum of two players per association.

Starting from 2016, the Africa Cup serves as a qualification event for the World Cup.

== Medalists ==
Year	City	Men's singles			Women's singles		
Year	City	Gold	Silver	Bronze	Gold	Silver	Bronze
1991	(Zaire) Kinshasa	(Nigeria); Sule Olaleye					
1997	(South Africa) Port Elizabeth	(Egypt); Ahmed Saleh	(Nigeria); Lanre Jegede		(Egypt); Shaimaa Abdul-Aziz	(Egypt); Bacent Osman	
1998	(Egypt) Cairo	(Egypt); El-sayed Lashin	(Egypt); Ahmed Saleh		(Egypt); Shaimaa Abdul-Aziz	(Egypt); Shahira El-Alfy	
1999	(Kenya) Nairobi	(Egypt); El-sayed Lashin	(Egypt); Ismael Hesham		(Egypt); Shahira El-Alfy	(South Africa); Surita Odendaal	
2001	(Egypt) Minya	(Egypt); Reda Amr	(Egypt); Ahmed Saleh		(Nigeria); Olufunke Oshonaike	(Egypt); Shahira El-Alfy	
2002	(South Africa) Johannesburg	(Egypt); El-sayed Lashin	(Egypt); Ahmed Saleh		(Egypt); Ayatollah	(Nigeria) Offiong Edem	
2009	(Morocco) Rabat	(Nigeria); Quadri Aruna			(Republic of the Congo); Han Xing		
2011	(Morocco) Rabat	(Egypt); Ahmed Saleh			(Egypt); Dina Meshref		
2013	(Republic of the Congo) Oyo	(Egypt) El-sayed Lashin			(Republic of the Congo); Han Xing		
2014	(Nigeria) Lagos	(Nigeria); Quadri Aruna			(Egypt); Dina Meshref		
2015	(Cameroon) Yaoundé	(Egypt); Omar Assar			(Egypt); Dina Meshref		
2016	(Sudan) Khartoum	(Nigeria); Quadri Aruna			(Egypt); Dina Meshref		
2017	(Morocco) Agadir	(Nigeria); Quadri Aruna	(Egypt); Omar Assar	(Egypt); Ahmed Saleh	(Egypt); Dina Meshref	(Nigeria); Olufunke Oshonaike	(Egypt); Yousra Helmy
2018	(Kenya) Nairobi	(Egypt); Omar Assar	(Nigeria); Quadri Aruna	(Egypt); Ahmed Saleh	(Egypt); Dina Meshref	(Cameroon); Sarah Hanffou	(Nigeria); Offiong Edem
2019	(Nigeria) Lagos	(Egypt); Omar Assar	(Nigeria); Quadri Aruna	(Egypt); Ahmed Saleh	(Egypt); Dina Meshref	(Egypt); Yousra Helmy	(Nigeria); Offiong Edem
2020	(Tunisia) Tunis	(Egypt); Ahmed Saleh	(Nigeria); Quadri Aruna	(Egypt); Omar Assar	(Egypt); Dina Meshref	(Nigeria); Offiong Edem	(Cameroon); Sarah Hanffou
2022	(Nigeria) Lagos	(Egypt); Omar Assar	(Nigeria); Quadri Aruna	(Egypt); Mohamed El-Beiali	(Egypt); Hana Goda	(Nigeria); Fatima Bello	(Egypt); Dina Meshref
2023	(Kenya) Nairobi	(Egypt); Omar Assar	(Nigeria); Quadri Aruna	(Egypt); Mohamed El-Beiali	(Egypt); Hana Goda	(Egypt); Dina Meshref	(Egypt); Marwa Alhodaby
2024	(Rwanda) Kigali	(Nigeria); Quadri Aruna	(Egypt); Mohamed El-Beiali	(Egypt); Youssef Abdel Aziz	(Egypt); Dina Meshref	(Egypt); Mariam Alhodaby	
2024	(Rwanda) Kigali	(Nigeria); Quadri Aruna	(Egypt); Mohamed El-Beiali	(Nigeria); Olajide Omotayo	(Egypt); Dina Meshref	(Egypt); Mariam Alhodaby	
2025	(Tunisia) Tunis	(Egypt); Omar Assar	(Nigeria); Quadri Aruna	(Cameroon); Ylane Batix	(Egypt); Hana Goda	(Egypt); Dina Meshref	
2025	(Tunisia) Tunis	(Egypt); Omar Assar	(Nigeria); Quadri Aruna	(Benin); Abdel-Kader Salifou	(Egypt); Hana Goda	(Egypt); Dina Meshref	
2026	(Libya) Benghazi	(Egypt); Omar Assar	(Algeria); Mehdi Bouloussa	(Algeria); Stéphane Ouaiche	(Egypt); Hana Goda	(Egypt); Dina Meshref	
2026	(Libya) Benghazi	(Egypt); Omar Assar	(Algeria); Mehdi Bouloussa	(Nigeria); Quadri Aruna	(Egypt); Hana Goda	(Egypt); Dina Meshref	

== See also ==
- African Table Tennis Championships
- African Table Tennis Federation
- PanAm Cup
- Asian Table Tennis Championships
