= Egypt at the 2000 Summer Olympics =

- IOC code: EGY
- NOC: Egyptian Olympic Committee
- Website: www.egyptianolympic.org (in Arabic and English)

in Sydney
- Competitors: 89 (74 men and 15 women) in 20 sports
- Flag bearer: Yahia Rashwan
- Medals: Gold 0 Silver 0 Bronze 0 Total 0

Summer Olympics appearances (overview)
- 1912; 1920; 1924; 1928; 1932; 1936; 1948; 1952; 1956; 1960–1964; 1968; 1972; 1976; 1980; 1984; 1988; 1992; 1996; 2000; 2004; 2008; 2012; 2016; 2020; 2024

Other related appearances
- 1906 Intercalated Games –––– United Arab Republic (1960, 1964)

Egypt competed at the 2000 Summer Olympics in Sydney, Australia. 89 competitors, 74 men and 15 women, took part in 64 events in 20 sports. Egyptian competitors did not win any medal at the Sydney Olympics.

Sydney 2000 marked the first time the Egyptian Olympic team competed in Australia as Egypt and other nations boycotted the 1956 Summer Olympics in Melbourne due to the Suez Crisis but Egypt did take part in the Equestrian events at the 1956 Summer Olympics in Stockholm five months earlier.

== Competitors ==
The following is the list of number of competitors in the Games.

Sport	Men	Women	Total
Archery	1	0	1
Athletics	2	0	2
Boxing	7	–	7
Cycling	4	0	4
Equestrian	1	0	1
Fencing	3	2	5
Gymnastics	1	1	2
Handball	15	0	15
Judo	3	1	4
Modern pentathlon	1	0	1
Rowing	7	0	7
Shooting	5	3	8
Swimming	5	1	6
Synchronized swimming	–	2	2
Table tennis	2	3	5
Taekwondo	2	1	3
Volleyball	12	0	12
Weightlifting	1	1	2
Wrestling	2	0	2
Total	74	15	89

== Archery ==
In Egypt's debut archery competition, the nation entered only one man. He lost his first match.

Athlete	Event	Ranking round		Round of 64	Round of 32	Round of 16	Quarterfinals	Semifinals	Final / BM	
Athlete	Event	Score	Seed	Opposition Score	Opposition Score	Opposition Score	Opposition Score	Opposition Score	Opposition Score	Rank
Essam Sayed	Men's individual	556	60	Zabrodsky (KAZ); L 149–166	did not advance					

== Athletics ==
Key

- Note–Ranks given for track events are within the athlete's heat only
- Q = Qualified for the next round
- q = Qualified for the next round as a fastest loser or, in field events, by position without achieving the qualifying target
- NR = National record
- N/A = Round not applicable for the event
- Bye = Athlete not required to compete in round

Men
Track and road events

Athletes	Events	Heat Round 1		Heat Round 2		Semifinal		Final	
Athletes	Events	Time	Rank	Time	Rank	Time	Rank	Time	Rank
Ahmed Abdel Mougod Soliman	Marathon	—N/a						2:22:47	47

Field events

Athlete	Event	Qualification		Final	
Athlete	Event	Distance	Position	Distance	Position
Hatem Mersal	Long jump	7.59	33	did not advance	

== Boxing ==
Athlete	Event	Round of 32	Round of 16	Quarterfinals	Semifinals	Final	
Athlete	Event	Opposition Result	Opposition Result	Opposition Result	Opposition Result	Opposition Result	Rank
Rezkalla Mohamed Abdelrehim	Light flyweight	Asloum (FRA); L 3–12	did not advance				
Saleh Khoulef	Light welterweight	Bye	Senchenko (UKR); W 19–16	Luna (CUB); L RSC-R2	did not advance		
Fadel Showban	Welterweight	Craig (USA); L RSC-R4	did not advance				
Mohamed Hikal	Light middleweight	Bye	Song (KOR); W 16–5	Thongburan (THA); L 9-15	did not advance		
Ramadan Yasser	Middleweight	Im (KOR); L 7–8	did not advance				
Amrou Moustafa	Heavyweight	—N/a	Chanturia (GEO); L RSC-R4	did not advance			
Ahmed Abdel Samad	Super heavyweight	—N/a	Saidov (UZB); L 8-21	did not advance			

== Cycling ==
=== Road Cycling ===
Athlete	Event	Time	Rank
Mahmoud Abbas	Men's road race	did not finish	
Amr Elnady	Men's road race	did not finish	
Mohamed Abdel Fattah	Men's road race	did not finish	
Mohamed Khulify	Men's road race	did not finish	
Amr Elnady	Men's time trial	1:03:18.138	36

== Equestrianism ==
Jumping

Athlete	Horse	Event	Qualification								Final				Total	
Athlete	Horse	Event	Round 1		Round 2			Round 3			Round A		Round B		Total	
Athlete	Horse	Event	Penalties	Rank	Penalties	Total	Rank	Penalties	Total	Rank	Penalties	Rank	Penalties	Rank	Penalties	Rank
André Salah Sakakini	Careful 23	Individual	8.50	23	8.00	16.50	24	8.00	24.50	26	did not advance					

== Fencing ==
Five fencers, three men and two women, represented Egypt in 2000.

Athlete	Event	Round of 64	Round of 32	Round of 16	Quarterfinal	Semifinal	Final / BM	
Athlete	Event	Opposition Score	Opposition Score	Opposition Score	Opposition Score	Opposition Score	Opposition Score	Rank
Tamer Mohamed Tahoun	Men's foil	Plumenail (FRA); L 9–15	did not advance					
Muhannad Saif El-Din	Men's épée	Zhao (CHN); L 12–15	did not advance					
Mahmoud Samir	Men's sabre	Smart (USA); L 5–15	did not advance					
Shaimaa El-Gammal	Women's foil	Marsh (USA); L 7–15	did not advance					
May Moustafa	Women's épée	Li (CHN); L 5–15	did not advance					

== Gymnastics ==
Men

Athlete	Event	Qualification								Final							
Athlete	Event	Apparatus						Total	Rank	Apparatus						Total	Rank
Athlete	Event	F	PH	R	V	PB	HB	Total	Rank	F	PH	R	V	PB	HB	Total	Rank
Raouf Abdelraouf	All-around	—N/a	8.300	9.100	9.462	8.350	—N/a	35.212	80	did not advance							

== Handball ==
Summary

Key:

- ET – After extra time
- P – Match decided by penalty-shootout.

Team	Event	Group Stage						Quarterfinal	Semifinal	Final / BM	
Team	Event	Opposition Score	Opposition Score	Opposition Score	Opposition Score	Opposition Score	Rank	Opposition Score	Opposition Score	Opposition Score	Rank
Egypt men's	Men's tournament	Russia; L 21–22	FR Yugoslavia; L 22–25	Cuba; W 29–26	South Korea; W 28–21	Germany; W 22–21	4 Q	Sweden; L 23–27	Germany; L 18–24	Slovenia; W 34–28	7

The following players represented Egypt:

- Ahmed Belal
- Amro El-Geioushy
- Ashraf Mabrouk Awaad
- Ayman El-Alfy
- Hany El-Fakharany
- Hazem Awaad
- Saber Hussein
- Hussain Said
- Hussain Zaky
- Magdy Abou El-Magd
- Mohamed Bakir El-Nakib
- Gohar Al-Nil
- Sherif Moemen
- Marwan Ragab
- Mohamed Sharaf El-Din

Group play

Pos	Team	Pld	W	D	L	GF	GA	GD	Pts	Qualification
1	Russia	5	4	0	1	129	121	+8	8	Quarterfinals
2	Germany	5	3	1	1	128	113	+15	7	Quarterfinals
3	Yugoslavia	5	3	0	2	130	127	+3	6 (Note: Yugoslavia 25–22 Egypt)	Quarterfinals
4	Egypt	5	3	0	2	122	115	+7	6	Quarterfinals
5	South Korea	5	1	1	3	128	131	−3	3	9th place game
6	Cuba	5	0	0	5	128	158	−30	0	11th place game

Notes:

16 September 2000; 19:30	Russia	22–21	Egypt	Pavilion 2, Sydney; Referees: Kohout, Dolejš (CZE)
16 September 2000; 19:30	Koksharov 7	(15–7)	Awaad 6	Pavilion 2, Sydney; Referees: Kohout, Dolejš (CZE)
16 September 2000; 19:30	3× (yellow card) 4× (suspension)		3× (yellow card) 2× (suspension)	Pavilion 2, Sydney; Referees: Kohout, Dolejš (CZE)

18 September 2000; 14:30	Egypt	22–25	Yugoslavia	Pavilion 2, Sydney; Referees: Gallego, Lamas (ESP)
18 September 2000; 14:30	Moemen 9	(14–11)	Škrbić 6	Pavilion 2, Sydney; Referees: Gallego, Lamas (ESP)
18 September 2000; 14:30	2× (yellow card) 1× (suspension)		4× (yellow card) 7× (suspension)	Pavilion 2, Sydney; Referees: Gallego, Lamas (ESP)

20 September 2000; 14:30	Egypt	29–26	Cuba	Pavilion 2, Sydney; Referees: Klucsó, Lekrinszki (HUN)
20 September 2000; 14:30	Zaky 8	(12–11)	Uríos 8	Pavilion 2, Sydney; Referees: Klucsó, Lekrinszki (HUN)
20 September 2000; 14:30	3× (yellow card) 3× (suspension)		2× (yellow card) 4× (suspension)	Pavilion 2, Sydney; Referees: Klucsó, Lekrinszki (HUN)

22 September 2000; 09:30	South Korea	21–28	Egypt	Pavilion 2, Sydney; Referees: Øie, Hogsnes (NOR)
22 September 2000; 09:30	Paek, Yoon K-s. 7	(8–15)	Awaad, Zaky 6	Pavilion 2, Sydney; Referees: Øie, Hogsnes (NOR)
22 September 2000; 09:30	3× (yellow card) 2× (suspension)		3× (yellow card) 2× (suspension)	Pavilion 2, Sydney; Referees: Øie, Hogsnes (NOR)

24 September 2000; 16:30	Germany	21–22	Egypt	Pavilion 2, Sydney; Referees: Hansson, Olsson (SWE)
24 September 2000; 16:30	Kehrmann, Von Behren 5	(11–8)	Al-Nil 5	Pavilion 2, Sydney; Referees: Hansson, Olsson (SWE)
24 September 2000; 16:30	3× (yellow card) 2× (suspension)		3× (yellow card) 6× (suspension) 1× (red card)	Pavilion 2, Sydney; Referees: Hansson, Olsson (SWE)

Quarterfinal

26 September 2000; 21:30	Sweden	27–23	Egypt	Pavilion 2, Sydney; Referees: Litvinov, Khudoerko (RUS)
26 September 2000; 21:30	Vranjes 7	(14–12)	Zaky 10	Pavilion 2, Sydney; Referees: Litvinov, Khudoerko (RUS)
26 September 2000; 21:30	3× (yellow card) 3× (suspension)		3× (yellow card) 8× (suspension)	Pavilion 2, Sydney; Referees: Litvinov, Khudoerko (RUS)

5th-8th place classification match

29 September 2000; 11:30	Germany	24–18	Egypt	The Dome, Sydney; Referees: Øie, Hogsnes (NOR)
29 September 2000; 11:30	Baur, Kehrmann 6	(10–9)	Hussein 6	The Dome, Sydney; Referees: Øie, Hogsnes (NOR)
29 September 2000; 11:30	2× (yellow card) 4× (suspension) 1× (red card)		2× (yellow card) 5× (suspension) 1× (red card)	The Dome, Sydney; Referees: Øie, Hogsnes (NOR)

7th place match

30 September 2000; 14:30	Slovenia	28–34	Egypt	The Dome, Sydney; Referees: Bojsen, Anusic (USA)
30 September 2000; 14:30	Pungartnik 11	(12–18)	three players 7	The Dome, Sydney; Referees: Bojsen, Anusic (USA)
30 September 2000; 14:30	2× (yellow card) 3× (suspension)		2× (yellow card) 2× (suspension)	The Dome, Sydney; Referees: Bojsen, Anusic (USA)

== Judo ==
=== Men ===
Athlete	Event	Round of 64	Round of 32	Round of 16	Quarterfinals	Semifinals	Repechage 1	Repechage 2	Repechage 3	Final / BM
Athlete	Event	Opposition Result	Opposition Result	Opposition Result	Opposition Result	Opposition Result	Opposition Result	Opposition Result	Opposition Result	Rank
Haitham Awad	73kg	Lombard (CUB); L	did not advance							
Bassel El-Gharbawy	100kg	Song (CHN); W	Soares (POR); L	did not advance						
Ahmed Baly	+100kg	Bye	Pérez (ESP); L	did not advance						

=== Women ===
Athlete	Event	Round of 32	Round of 16	Quarterfinals	Semifinals	Repechage 1	Repechage 2	Repechage 3	Final / BM	
Athlete	Event	Opposition Result	Opposition Result	Opposition Result	Opposition Result	Opposition Result	Opposition Result	Opposition Result	Opposition Result	Rank
Heba Hefny	+78kg	—N/a	Köppen (GER); L	did not advance		Prokofyeva (UKR); W	Cicot (FRA); L	did not advance		

== Modern pentathlon ==
Athlete	Event	Shooting (10 m air pistol)			Fencing (épée one touch)			Swimming (200 m freestyle)			Riding (show jumping)			Running (3000 m)			Total points	Final rank
Athlete	Event	Points	Rank	MP Points	Results	Rank	MP points	Time	Rank	MP points	Penalties	Rank	MP points	Time	Rank	MP Points	Total points	Final rank
Emad El-Geziry	Men's	165	23	916	9	19	720	2:08.61	12	1214	223	19	877	9:32.41	10	1112	4839	19

== Rhythmic gymnastics ==
Individual all-around

Athlete	Event	Qualification						Final					
Athlete	Event	Rope	Hoop	Ball	Ribbon	Total	Rank	Rope	Hoop	Ball	Ribbon	Total	Rank
Sherin Taama	Individual	9.241	9.250	9.170	9.141	36.802	24	did not advance					

== Rowing ==
=== Men ===
Athlete	Event	Heats		Repechage		Semifinals		Final	
Athlete	Event	Time	Rank	Time	Rank	Time	Rank	Time	Rank
Ali Ibrahim	Single sculls	7:21.32	4 R	7:13.10	3 SF C/D	7:17.06	1 FC	7:01.44	13
Amir Temraz; Alaa El-Din Ahmed	Coxless pair	7:15.63	5 R	7:07.35	5	did not advance			15
Hamdy El-Kot; El-Atek Mohamed; Tarek Hamid; Kamal Abdel Rehim	Coxless four	6:21.10	4 R	6:13.73	3 SF A/B	6:21.22	6 FB	6:08.37	12

== Shooting ==
Men

Athlete	Event	Qualification		Final	
Athlete	Event	Points	Rank	Total	Rank
Mohamed Abdullah	10m air rifle	590	11	did not advance	
Moustafa Hamdy	Skeet	118	32	did not advance	
Mohamed Khorshed	Skeet	119	23	did not advance	
Ayman Mazhar	Double trap	125	20	did not advance	
Tarek Riad	10m air pistol	571	27	did not advance	
Tarek Riad	50m pistol	544	31	did not advance	

Women

Athlete	Event	Qualification		Final	
Athlete	Event	Points	Rank	Total	Rank
Hebatallah El-Wazan	10m air pistol	379	16	did not advance	
Yasmine Helmi	10m air rifle	390	28	did not advance	
Marwa Sultan	10m air rifle	376	49	did not advance	

== Swimming ==
=== Men ===
Athlete	Event	Heat		Semifinal		Final	
Athlete	Event	Time	Rank	Time	Rank	Time	Rank
Tamer Hamed	50m freestyle	23.77	46	did not advance			
Tamer Hamed	100m freestyle	52.14	44	did not advance			
Mahmoud Elwany	200m freestyle	1:55.19	46	did not advance			
Hani Elteir	400m freestyle	4:04.23	44	—N/a		did not advance	
Haitham Hassan	100m backstroke	58.67	44	did not advance			
Ahmed Hussein	200m backstroke	2:06.10	36	did not advance			
Haitham Hassan	100m butterfly	56.42	53	did not advance			
Haitham Hassan	200m individual medley	2:09.92	51	did not advance			

=== Women ===
Athlete	Event	Heat		Semifinal		Final	
Athlete	Event	Time	Rank	Time	Rank	Time	Rank
Rania Elwani	50m freestyle	25.87	15 Q	25.95	15	did not advance	
Rania Elwani	100m freestyle	56.31	15 Q	55.85	11	did not advance	
Rania Elwani	200m freestyle	2:01.93	21	did not advance			

== Synchronized swimming ==
Women's Duet

- Heba Abdel Gawad and Sara Abdel Gawad
  1. Technical Routine – 29.727

Athlete	Event	Technical routine		Free routine (preliminary)				Free routine (final)		Total	
Athlete	Event	Points	Rank	Points	Rank	Total	Rank	Points	Rank	Points	Rank
Heba Abdel Gawad; Sara Abdel Gawad	Duet	29.727	21	55.924	19	85.021	20	did not advance			

== Table Tennis ==
Men

Athlete	Event	Qualification round	Group stage			Round of 32	Round of 16	Quarterfinals	Semifinals	Final / BM
Athlete	Event	Opposition Result	Opposition Result	Rank	Opposition Result	Opposition Result	Opposition Result	Opposition Result	Opposition Result	Rank
Ashraf Helmy	Singles	—N/a	Roßkopf (GER); L 0–3	Zhuang (USA); L 1–3	3	did not advance				
El-Sayed Lashin	Singles	—N/a	Suseno (INA); W 3–0	Kreanga (GRE); L 0–3	2	did not advance				
Ashraf Helmy; El-Sayed Lashin	Doubles	Sweeris / Zhuang (USA); L 1–2	did not advance			—N/a	did not advance			

Women

Athlete	Event	Qualification round	Group stage			Round of 32	Round of 16	Quarterfinals	Semifinals	Final / BM
Athlete	Event	Opposition Result	Opposition Result	Rank	Opposition Result	Opposition Result	Opposition Result	Opposition Result	Opposition Result	Rank
Shaimaa Abdul Aziz	Singles	—N/a	Melnik (RUS); L 0–3	Wong (HKG); L 0–3	3	did not advance				
Shahira El-Alfy	Singles	—N/a	Pavlovich (BLR); L 0–3	Svensson (SWE); L 0–3	2	did not advance				
Shaimaa Abdul Aziz; Bacinte Osman	Doubles	Ramírez / Suárez (CUB); W 2–0	Kostromina / Pavlovich (BLR); L 0–2	Å Svensson / M Svensson (SWE); L 0–2	3	—N/a	did not advance			

== Taekwondo ==
Athlete	Event	Round of 16	Quarterfinals	Semifinals	Repechage Quarterfinals	Repechage Semifinals	Final / BM	
Athlete	Event	Opposition Result	Opposition Result	Opposition Result	Opposition Result	Opposition Result	Opposition Result	Rank
Talaat Abada	Men's −58 kg	Mouroutsos (GRE); L 0–5	did not advance		Huang (TPE); L 2–7	did not advance		
Yahia Rashwan	Men's +80 kg	Gentil (FRA); L 1–4	did not advance					
Shimaa Afifi	Women's −57 kg	Athanasopoulou (GRE); L 7–7	did not advance					

== Volleyball ==
=== Indoor ===
Summary

Team	Event	Group stage						Quarterfinal	Semifinal	Final / BM	
Team	Event	Opposition Score	Opposition Score	Opposition Score	Opposition Score	Opposition Score	Rank	Opposition Score	Opposition Score	Opposition Score	Rank
United States men	Men's tournament	Spain; L 0–3	Brazil; L 0–3	Cuba; L 0–3	Netherlands; L 1–3	Australia; L 0–3	6	did not advance			

==== Men ====
- Team Roster
  - Mohamed Mouselhy
  - Mahmoud Abdul El Aziz
  - Ashraf Abou El Hassan
  - Eslam Awad
  - Mohamed El Houseny
  - Hamdy El Safy
  - Ibrahim Fathy
  - Sayed Khalil
  - Ussama Komsan
  - Hany Mouselhy
  - Ibrahim Rashwan
  - Nehad Shehata

Group play

Pos	Team	Pld	W	L	Pts	SW	SL	SR	SPW	SPL	SPR	Qualification
1	Brazil	5	5	0	10	15	1	15.000	415	331	1.254	Quarterfinals
2	Netherlands	5	4	1	9	12	5	2.400	417	360	1.158	Quarterfinals
3	Cuba	5	3	2	8	9	7	1.286	383	335	1.143	Quarterfinals
4	Australia	5	2	3	7	6	10	0.600	327	374	0.874	Quarterfinals
5	Spain	5	1	4	6	7	12	0.583	404	444	0.910	
6	Egypt	5	0	5	5	1	15	0.067	309	411	0.752	

Date	Venue		Score		Set 1	Set 2	Set 3	Set 4	Set 5	Total
17 Sep	SP4	Spain	3–0	Egypt	25–20	25–10	25–21			75–51
19 Sep	SEC	Egypt	0–3	Brazil	28–30	18–25	21–25			67–80
21 Sep	SP4	Cuba	3–0	Egypt	25–11	25–18	25–15			75–44
23 Sep	SP4	Egypt	1–3	Netherlands	21–25	11–25	33–31	20–25		85–106
25 Sep	SEC	Australia	3–0	Egypt	25–17	25–23	25–22			75–62

== Weightlifting ==
Athlete	Event	Snatch		Clean & Jerk		Total	
Athlete	Event	Weight	Rank	Weight	Rank	Weight	Rank
Mohamed Moussa El-Dib	Men's –85 kg	160.0	=12	192.5	=13	352.5	15
Nagwan El-Zawawi	Women's –69 kg	92.5	=11	No lift		did not finish	

== Wrestling ==
Greco-Roman

Athlete	Event	Elimination pool				Quarterfinals	Semifinals	Final / BM	
Athlete	Event	Opposition Result	Opposition Result	Opposition Result	Rank	Opposition Result	Opposition Result	Opposition Result	Rank
Mohamed Moustafa Abou Elea	54 kg	Kalashnykov (UKR); L 2–16	Kalilov (KGZ); L 1–3	Mays (USA); W 5–3	3	did not advance			
Mohamed Abd El-Fatah	85 kg	Méndez (CUB); L 3–4	Clark (USA); W 12–0	—N/a	2	did not advance			

== Notes ==
- Wallechinsky, David (2004). The Complete Book of the Summer Olympics (Athens 2004 Edition). Toronto, Canada. ISBN 1-894963-32-6.
- International Olympic Committee (2001). The Results. Retrieved 12 November 2005.
- Sydney Organising Committee for the Olympic Games (2001). Official Report of the XXVII Olympiad Volume 1: Preparing for the Games. Retrieved 20 November 2005.
- Sydney Organising Committee for the Olympic Games (2001). Official Report of the XXVII Olympiad Volume 2: Celebrating the Games. Retrieved 20 November 2005.
- Sydney Organising Committee for the Olympic Games (2001). The Results. Retrieved 20 November 2005.
- International Olympic Committee Web Site
