= Lithuania at the 2000 Summer Olympics =

- IOC code: LTU
- NOC: Lithuanian National Olympic Committee
- Website: www.ltok.lt (in Lithuanian and English)

in Sydney
- Competitors: 61 in 15 sports
- Flag bearer: Romas Ubartas
- Medals Ranked 33rd: Gold 2 Silver 0 Bronze 3 Total 5

Summer Olympics appearances (overview)
- 1924; 1928; 1932–1988; 1992; 1996; 2000; 2004; 2008; 2012; 2016; 2020; 2024

Other related appearances
- Russian Empire (1908–1912); Soviet Union (1952–1988)

Lithuania competed at the 2000 Summer Olympics in Sydney, Australia.

== Medalists ==
Lithuania finished in 33rd position in the final medal rankings, with two gold medals and three bronze medals.

| Medal | Name | Sport | Event |
|---|---|---|---|
| Gold | Virgilijus Alekna | Athletics | Men's discus throw |
| Gold | Daina Gudzinevičiūtė | Shooting | Women's trap shooting |
| Bronze | Saulius Štombergas; Mindaugas Timinskas; Eurelijus Žukauskas; Darius Maskoliūnas; Ramūnas Šiškauskas; Darius Songaila; Šarūnas Jasikevičius; Kęstutis Marčiulionis; Tomas Masiulis; Dainius Adomaitis; Gintaras Einikis; Andrius Giedraitis | Basketball | Men's team competition |
| Bronze | Diana Žiliūtė | Cycling | Women's individual road race |
| Bronze | Kristina Poplavskaja; Birutė Šakickienė | Rowing | Women's double sculls |

== Athletics ==
Men
Track & road events

| Athlete | Event | Heat | | Quarterfinal | | Semifinal | | Final | |
| Athlete | Event | Result | Rank | Result | Rank | Result | Rank | Result | Rank |
|---|---|---|---|---|---|---|---|---|---|
| Jonas Motiejūnas | 400 m | DNF | | did not advance | | | | | |
| Daugvinas Zujus | 50 km walk | — | | | | | | 4:06:04 | 30 |

Field events

| Athlete | Event | Qualification | | Final | |
| Athlete | Event | Distance | Position | Distance | Position |
|---|---|---|---|---|---|
| Virgilijus Alekna | Discus throw | 67.10 | 3 Q | 69.30 | |
| Tomas Bardauskas | Long jump | 7.70 | 27 | did not advance | |
| Arūnas Jurkšas | Javelin throw | 73.05 | 29 | did not advance | |
| Vaclavas Kidykas | Discus throw | 58.96 | 30 | did not advance | |
| Saulius Kleiza | Shot put | 18.59 | 28 | did not advance | |
| Romas Ubartas | Discus throw | 60.50 | 27 | did not advance | |

Women
Track & road events

| Athlete | Event | Heat | | Quarterfinal | | Semifinal | | Final | |
| Athlete | Event | Result | Rank | Result | Rank | Result | Rank | Result | Rank |
|---|---|---|---|---|---|---|---|---|---|
| Inga Juodeškienė | 5000 m | 15:46.37 | 29 | did not advance | | | | | |
| Irina Krakoviak | 1500 m | 04:10.21 | 6 Q | — | | 04:14.57 | 11 | did not advance | |
| Sonata Milušauskaitė | 20 km walk | — | | | | | | 1:37:14 | 31 |
| Žana Minina | 400 m | 52.38 | 3 Q | 52.53 | 6 | did not advance | | | |
| Kristina Saltanovič | 20 km walk | — | | | | | | 1:34:24 | 16 |
| Agnė Visockaitė | 100 m | 11.87 | 6 | did not advance | | | | | |

Field events

| Athlete | Event | Qualification | | Final | |
| Athlete | Event | Distance | Position | Distance | Position |
|---|---|---|---|---|---|
| Renata Gustaitytė | Discus throw | 53.64 | 30 | did not advance | |
| Rita Ramanauskaitė | Javelin throw | 59.21 | 13 | did not advance | |
| Nelė Žilinskienė | High jump | 1.89 | 21 | did not advance | |

Combined events – Heptathlon

| Athlete | Event | 100H | HJ | SP | 200 m | LJ | JT | 800 m | Final | Rank |
|---|---|---|---|---|---|---|---|---|---|---|
| Austra Skujytė | Result | 14.37 | 1.78 | 15.09 | 25.35 | 5.97 | 45.43 | 02:20.25 | 6034 | 12 |
| Austra Skujytė | Points | 927 | 953 | 867 | 855 | 840 | 772 | 820 | 6034 | 12 |

== Basketball ==
=== Men's team competition ===
==== Group A ====
| Team | W | L | PF | PA | PD | Pts | Tie |
|---|---|---|---|---|---|---|---|
| United States | 5 | 0 | 505 | 359 | +146 | 10 | |
| Italy | 3 | 2 | 332 | 349 | −17 | 8 | 1W–0L |
| Lithuania | 3 | 2 | 372 | 339 | +33 | 8 | 0W–1L |
| France | 2 | 3 | 372 | 374 | −2 | 7 | 1W–0L |
| China | 2 | 3 | 368 | 419 | −51 | 7 | 0W–1L |
| New Zealand | 0 | 5 | 307 | 416 | −109 | 5 | |

17 September
11:30

| Italy | 50–48 | Lithuania |

The Dome, Sydney

19 September
19:30

| Lithuania | 81–63 | France |

The Dome, Sydney

21 September
16:30

| United States | 85–76 | Lithuania |

The Dome, Sydney

23 September
9:30

| Lithuania | 82–66 | China |

The Dome, Sydney

25 September
11:30

| Lithuania | 85–75 | New Zealand |

The Dome, Sydney

==== Quarterfinals ====
28 September
11:30

| Lithuania | 76–63 | Yugoslavia |

The Dome, Sydney

==== Semi-finals ====
29 September
11:30

| Lithuania | 83–85 | United States |

The Dome, Sydney

==== Bronze-medal match ====
1 October
11:30

| Lithuania | 89–71 | Australia |

The Dome, Sydney

==== Team roster ====
- Andrius Giedraitis
- Dainius Adomaitis
- Darius Maskoliūnas
- Eurelijus Žukauskas
- Gintaras Einikis
- Kęstutis Marčiulionis
- Mindaugas Timinskas
- Darius Songaila
- Ramūnas Šiškauskas
- Šarūnas Jasikevičius
- Saulius Štombergas
- Tomas Masiulis

== Boxing ==
Men

| Athlete | Event | Round of 32 | Round of 16 | Quarterfinals | Semifinals | Final | |
| Athlete | Event | Opposition Result | Opposition Result | Opposition Result | Opposition Result | Opposition Result | Rank |
|---|---|---|---|---|---|---|---|
| Ivanas Stapovičius | Light Flyweight | Muhamed Kizito (UGA); W 9-3 | Liborio Romero (MEX); W 24-11 | Kim Un-Chol (PRK); L 10-22 | Did not advance | | 5 |
| Vidas Bičiulaitis | Featherweight | Kamil Djamaloudinov (RUS); L 5-9 | Did not advance | | | | |

== Canoeing ==
=== Sprint ===
Men

| Athlete | Event | Heats | | Semifinals | | Final | |
| Athlete | Event | Time | Rank | Time | Rank | Time | Rank |
|---|---|---|---|---|---|---|---|
| Alvydas Duonėla | K-1 500 m | 1:43.877 | 7 QS | 1:40.368 | 2 FA | 2:04.591 | 7 |
| Vaidas Mizeras | K-1 1000 m | 3:40.202 | 6 QS | 3:41.969 | 6 | Did not advance | 14 |
| Egidijus Balčiūnas; Alvydas Duonėla | K-2 500 m | 1:32.931 | 5 QS | 1:32.084 | 5 FA | Did not advance | 9 |

== Cycling ==
=== Road ===
Men

| Athlete | Event | Time | Rank |
|---|---|---|---|
| Artūras Kasputis | Men's road race | DNF | |
| Artūras Kasputis | Men's road time trial | 1:01:22 | 25 |
| Remigijus Lupeikis | Men's road race | DNF | |
| Raimondas Rumšas | Men's road race | 5:30:46 | 44 |
| Raimondas Rumšas | Men's road time trial | 1:01:08.95 | 23 |
| Saulius Šarkauskas | Men's road race | DNF | |

Women

| Athlete | Event | Time | Rank |
|---|---|---|---|
| Edita Pučinskaitė | Women's road race | 3:06:37 | 25 |
| Edita Pučinskaitė | Women's time trial | 0:43:48 | 10 |
| Diana Žiliūtė | Women's road race | 3:06:31 | |
| Diana Žiliūtė | Women's time trial | 0:43:39 | 9 |
| Rasa Polikevičiūtė | Women's road race | 3:06:31 | 13 |

=== Track ===
Pursuit

| Athlete | Event | Qualification | | Quarterfinals | Semifinals | Final | |
| Athlete | Event | Time | Rank | Opposition Time | Opposition Time | Opposition Time | Rank |
|---|---|---|---|---|---|---|---|
| Rasa Mažeikytė | Women's individual pursuit | 03:43.980 | 11 | did not advance | | | |

Points

| Athlete | Event | Final | |
| Athlete | Event | Points | Rank |
|---|---|---|---|
| Rasa Mažeikytė | Women's points race | 2 | 12 |

== Gymnastics ==
=== Artistic ===
Women

| Athlete | Event | Qualification | | | | | | Final | | | | | |
| Athlete | Event | Apparatus | | | | Total | Rank | Apparatus | | | | Total | Rank |
| Athlete | Event | F | V | UB | BB | Total | Rank | F | V | UB | BB | Total | Rank |
|---|---|---|---|---|---|---|---|---|---|---|---|---|---|
| Julija Kovaliova | All-around | 9.225 | 8.737 | 9.575 | 8.462 | 35.999 | 53 | did not advance | | | | | |

== Judo ==
Men

| Athlete | Event | Preliminary | Round of 32 | Round of 16 | Quarterfinals | Semifinals | Repechage 1 | Repechage 2 | Repechage 3 | Repechage final | Final / BM | |
| Athlete | Event | Opposition Result | Opposition Result | Opposition Result | Opposition Result | Opposition Result | Opposition Result | Opposition Result | Opposition Result | Opposition Result | Opposition Result | Rank |
|---|---|---|---|---|---|---|---|---|---|---|---|---|
| Marius Paškevičius | −100 kg | BYE | Alejandro Bender (ARG); W 0001–0000 | Mário Sabino (BRA); L 0000–0001 | did not advance | | | | | | | |

== Modern pentathlon ==
One male pentathlete represented Lithuania in 1992.

| Athlete | Event | Shooting (10 m air pistol) | Fencing (épée one touch) | Swimming (200 m freestyle) | Riding (show jumping) | Running (3000 m) | Total points | Final rank |
| Athlete | Event | Points | Points | Points | Points | Points | Total points | Final rank |
|---|---|---|---|---|---|---|---|---|
| Andrejus Zadneprovskis | Men's | 1000 | 840 | 1257 | 955 | 1184 | 5236 | 7 |

== Rowing ==
Women

| Athlete | Event | Heats | | Repechage | | Semifinals C-D | | Semifinals | | Final | |
| Athlete | Event | Time | Rank | Time | Rank | Time | Rank | Time | Rank | Time | Rank |
|---|---|---|---|---|---|---|---|---|---|---|---|
| Kristina Poplavskaja; Birutė Šakickienė | Double sculls | 7:13.04 | 2 R | 7:08.18 | 1 Q | — | | | | 7:01.71 | |

== Sailing ==
Open

| Athlete | Event | Race | | | | | | | | | | | Net points | Final rank |
| Athlete | Event | 1 | 2 | 3 | 4 | 5 | 6 | 7 | 8 | 9 | 10 | M | Net points | Final rank |
|---|---|---|---|---|---|---|---|---|---|---|---|---|---|---|
| Giedrius Gužys | Laser | 18 | ~~30~~ | ~~35~~ | 22 | 17 | 22 | 26 | 12 | 6 | 25 | 29 | 177 | 25 |

== Shooting ==
Women

| Athlete | Event | Qualification | | Final | |
| Athlete | Event | Score | Rank | Score | Rank |
|---|---|---|---|---|---|
| Daina Gudzinevičiūtė | Trap | 71 OR | 1 Q | 93 OR | |

== Swimming ==
Men

| Athlete | Event | Heat | | Semifinal | | Final | |
| Athlete | Event | Time | Rank | Time | Rank | Time | Rank |
|---|---|---|---|---|---|---|---|
| Darius Grigalionis | 100 m backstroke | 56.47 | 24 | did not advance | | | |
| Rolandas Gimbutis | 50 m freestyle | 23.36 | 38 | did not advance | | | |
| Rolandas Gimbutis | 100 m freestyle | 50.46 | 23 | did not advance | | | |
| Arūnas Savickas | 200 m freestyle | 1:52.02 | 23 | did not advance | | | |
| Arūnas Savickas | 200 m backstroke | 02:05.06 | 32 | did not advance | | | |
| Arūnas Savickas; Minvydas Packevičius; Saulius Binevičius; Rolandas Gimbutis | 4 × 100 m freestyle relay | 03:23.68 | 16 | did not advance | | | |

Women

| Athlete | Event | Heat | | Semifinal | | Final | |
| Athlete | Event | Time | Rank | Time | Rank | Time | Rank |
|---|---|---|---|---|---|---|---|
| Jūratė Ladavičiūtė | 50 m freestyle | 27.54 | 50 | did not advance | | | |
| Jūratė Ladavičiūtė | 100 m freestyle | 58.78 | 41 | did not advance | | | |

== Table tennis ==
Singles

| Athlete | Event | Group round | | Round of 32 | Round of 16 | Quarterfinals | Semifinals | Bronze medal | Final |
| Athlete | Event | Opposition Result | Rank | Opposition Result | Opposition Result | Opposition Result | Opposition Result | Opposition Result | Rank |
|---|---|---|---|---|---|---|---|---|---|
| Rūta Garkauskaitė | Women's singles | Group I Chunli Li (NZL); L 1 – 3 Berta Rodríguez (CHI); W 3 – 1 | 2 | did not advance | | | | | |

Doubles

| Athlete | Event | Group round | | Round of 16 | Quarterfinals | Semifinals | Bronze medal | Final |
| Athlete | Event | Opposition Result | Rank | Opposition Result | Opposition Result | Opposition Result | Opposition Result | Rank |
|---|---|---|---|---|---|---|---|---|
| Rūta Garkauskaitė; Jolanta Prūsienė | Women's doubles | Group B Kazuko Naito; Rinko Sakata (JPN); W 2 – 0 Lay Jian Fang; Stella Zhou (AUS); W 2 – 0 | 1 Q | Sun Jin; Yang Ying (CHN); L 0 – 3 | did not advance | | | |

== Weightlifting ==
Men

| Athlete | Event | Snatch | | Clean & Jerk | | Total | Rank |
| Athlete | Event | Result | Rank | Result | Rank | Total | Rank |
|---|---|---|---|---|---|---|---|
| Ramūnas Vyšniauskas | −105 kg | 175.0 | 14 | 210.0 | 10 | 385.0 | 11 |

== Wrestling ==
Men's freestyle

| Athlete | Event | Elimination Pool | | | | Quarterfinal | Semifinal | Final / BM | |
| Athlete | Event | Opposition Result | Opposition Result | Opposition Result | Rank | Opposition Result | Opposition Result | Opposition Result | Rank |
|---|---|---|---|---|---|---|---|---|---|
| Ričardas Pauliukonis | −97 kg | Eldar Kurtanidze (GEO); L 1-11 | Arawat Sabejew (GER); L 1-5 | — | 3 | did not advance | | | 17 |

Men's Greco-Roman

| Athlete | Event | Elimination Pool | | | | Quarterfinal | Semifinal | Final / BM | |
| Athlete | Event | Opposition Result | Opposition Result | Opposition Result | Rank | Opposition Result | Opposition Result | Opposition Result | Rank |
|---|---|---|---|---|---|---|---|---|---|
| Mindaugas Ežerskis | −97 kg | Sergey Lishtvan (BLR); W 3-1 | Hassene Fkiri (TUN); W 6-3 | Davyd Saldadze (UKR); L 0-2 | 2 | did not advance | | | 8 |
