= Nigeria at the 1987 All-Africa Games =

- IOC code: NGR
- NOC: Nigerian Olympic Committee

in Nairobi
- Medals Ranked 3rd: Gold 23 Silver 16 Bronze 21 Total 60

All-Africa Games appearances (overview)
- 1965; 1973; 1978; 1987; 1991; 1995; 1999; 2003; 2007; 2011; 2015; 2019; 2023

Youth appearances
- 2010; 2014

Nigeria participated at the 1987 All-Africa Games held at the Moi International Sports Centre in Kasarani in the city of Nairobi, Kenya. It was the fourth time that the country had taken part in the games and expectations were high for the country’s competitors after their second place in the medal table in the previous games held in Algeria. The country did well, achieving third place in the medal table with 23 gold medals. Amongst the winners were Bose Kaffo, who went on to win medals in five subsequent All Africa Games, and Mary Onyali, the first athlete to represent Nigeria at five Olympiads.

== Medal summary ==
Nigeria won 60 medals in total.

=== Medal table ===
Sport	Gold	Silver	Bronze	Total
Athletics	14	7	6	27
Boxing	0	1	0	1
Field hockey	0	0	1	1
Football	0	0	0	0
Swimming	0	2	4	6
Swimming	0	0	1	1
Table tennis	4	3	4	11
Taekwondo	3	0	0	3
Volleyball	0	0	1	1
Weightlifting	3	3	4	10
Total	23	16	21	60

== List of Medalists ==
=== Gold Medal ===
Medal	Name	Sport	Event	Date	Ref
Gold	Chidi Imo	Athletics	Men's 100m		
Gold	Tina Iheagwam	Athletics	Women's 100m		
Gold	Mary Onyali	Athletics	Women's 200m		
Gold	Innocent Egbunike	Athletics	Men's 400m		
Gold	Maria Usifo	Athletics	Women's 100m hurdles		
Gold	Maria Usifo	Athletics	Women's 400m hurdles		
Gold	Paul Emordi	Athletics	Men's long jump		
Gold	Beatrice Utondu	Athletics	Women's long jump		
Gold	Adewale Olukoju	Athletics	Men's shot put		
Gold	Adewale Olukoju	Athletics	Men's discus		
Gold		Athletics	Men's 4 × 100 metres relay		
Gold	Moses Ugbusien; Joseph Fallaye; Henry Amike; Innocent Egbunike	Athletics	Men's 4 × 400 metres relay		
Gold		Athletics	Women's 4 × 100 metres relay		
Gold		Athletics	Women's 4 × 400 metres relay		
Gold	Lawrence Iquaibom	Weightlifting	60 kg		
Gold	Emmanuel Oshomah	Weightlifting	100 kg		
Gold	Ojadi Aduche	Weightlifting	+110 kg		
Gold	Atanda Musa	Table tennis	Men's singles		
Gold	Titus Omotara; Atanda Musa	Table tennis	Men's doubles		
Gold	Iyabo Akanmu	Table tennis	Women's doubles		
Gold	Kubrat Owolabi; Atanda Musa	Table tennis	Mixed doubles		
Gold	Dominic Kim	Taekwondo	Men's lightweight		
Gold	Anthony Ilukhor	Taekwondo	Men's middleweight		
Gold	Pius Ilukhor	Taekwondo	Men's heavyweight		

=== Silver Medal ===
Medal	Name	Sport	Event	Date	Ref
Silver	Falilat Ogunkoya	Athletics	Women's 100m		
Silver	Falilat Ogunkoya	Athletics	Women's 200m		
Silver	Asmir Okoro	Athletics	Men's high jump		
Silver	Yusuf Alli	Athletics	Men's long jump		
Silver	Comfort Igeh	Athletics	Women's long jump		
Silver	Joseph Taiwo	Athletics	Men's triple jump		
Silver	Mbanefo Akpom	Athletics	Men's decathlon		
Silver	Moshood Adeniy	Weightlifting	67.5 kg		
Silver	Muyiwa Odusanya	Weightlifting	82.5 kg		
Silver	Olusola Awosina	Weightlifting	90 kg		
Silver	Martin Nougle	Boxing	Men's 71kg		
Silver	Titus Omotara	Table tennis	Men's singles		
Silver	Fatai Adeyemo; Sule Olaleye	Table tennis	Men's doubles		
Silver	Bose Kaffo; Titus Omotara	Table tennis	Mixed doubles		

=== Bronze Medal ===
Medal	Name	Sport	Event	Date	Ref
Bronze	Mary Onyali	Athletics	Women's 100m		
Bronze	Tina Iheagwam	Athletics	Women's 200m		
Bronze	Moses Ugbisie	Athletics	Men's 400m		
Bronze	Eseme Ikpoto	Athletics	Men's 800m		
Bronze	Henry Amike	Athletics	Men's 400m hurdles		
Bronze	Joseph Kio	Athletics	Men's long jump		
Bronze	Mammah Enuwozo Ngozi	Swimming	Women's 100m breaststroke		
Bronze	Jimmy Idogesit	Weightlifting	67.5 kg		
Bronze	Godfrey Ehineboh	Weightlifting	75 kg		
Bronze	Joseph Osiobor	Weightlifting	90 kg		
Bronze	Bartholomew Oluoma	Weightlifting	110 kg		
Bronze	Nigeria men's national volleyball team	Volleyball	Volleyball - Men		
Bronze	Nigeria men's national field hockey team	Field hockey	Field hockey - Men		
