= Cosmas Maduka =

Nigerian businessman (born 1958)

Cosmas Maduka CON
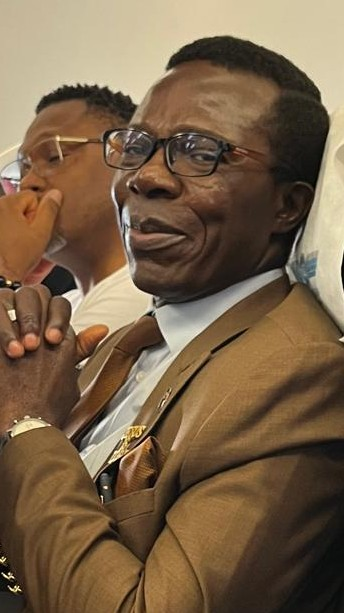
- Maduka in 2025
- Born: 24 December 1958 (age 67); Nnewi, Anambra, Nigeria Protectorate
- Occupation: Businessman
- Spouse: Charity Maduka (m. 1978; died 2021)

Cosmas Maduka CON // (born December 24, 1958) is a Nigerian businessman, philanthropist and evangelist. He is the founder and chairman of the Coscharis Group.

In 2015, Maduka was featured in Forbes Africa TV Series “Worst Day with Peace Hyde” and was estimated to be worth $500million USD. Maduka has also appeared on CNN Marketplace Africa interview by Zaner Asher.

== Early life ==
Maduka was born into the family of Mr. Peter and Mrs. Rose Maduka in the City of Jos. Maduka began his entrepreneurial journey at the age of six, two years after his father died. He dropped out of primary school and started hawking Akara, a popular Nigerian food staple made from beans to support his mother.

== Business career ==
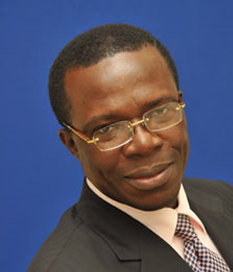
Maduka in 2016

Maduka formally ventured into business at the age of 17 after being wrongly dismissed with the sum of N200.00 by his uncle who had earlier engaged him as an automobile apprentice. He co-founded a spare parts company known as CosDave with his friend named Dave. The startup also failed sooner than expected and Maduka went on to found Coscharis Motor with the sum of three hundred nairas (N300) which focused on sales of automobile spare parts in 1977. The name of the company according to him is a combination of his first name, Cosmos, and his wife, Charity, whom he married at age 21. Maduka's business breakthrough started in 1982 when the Nigerian government granted ten (10) motor companies import licenses, for which Coscharis was selected. Today the Coscharis Group is a conglomerate with a net worth of $500 million with several subsidiaries including Manufacturing, ICT, Petrochemical, Auto care and Auto Components, Automobile Sales and Services, Agric, and Agro Allied business sectors. Coscharis Motors is a leading distributor of several brands of luxury cars including Range Rover, Ford, and Jaguar.

In 2015, Coscharis Motors became the sole distributor of the BMW in Nigeria and the first company to build an Assembly Plant for the Ford Ranger in Nigeria and won the Auto Brand of the Year at the Marketing World Awards held in Ghana. In 2016, the Anambra State approved 5000 hectares of land for Coscharis Farms to cultivate rice, the project has been reported to generate 3000 jobs upon completion. The Coscharis Group is rated one of the top 50 brands in Nigeria by Top 50 Brands Nigeria.

Maduka attributed his success in business to his affiliation with the Japanese. According to Maduka his early close contact with the Japanese made him develop the values of commitment, humility, precision, and hard work which were fundamental to his success in business. He had promised to acknowledge this in his autobiography.

Cosmas Maduka is a member on the board of several companies and organizations, including the Nigerian Table Tennis Federation for 16 years. He served as a Director for Access Bank Plc, a multinational Nigerian bank, from 2000 to 2012.

== Mentorship and youth empowerment ==
Cosmas Maduka engages in business mentorship and empowerment. He relates this in stories during a concluded ‘Stanel Youths Empowerment Master Class’ held at Stanel Dome in Awka, Anambra State how he empowered Dr. Stanley Uzochukwu, Chairman and owner of Stanel Group with a business start-up capital of One Hundred and Fifty Million Naira (N150,000,000) and made him one of Nigerian youngest billionaires.

== Personal life ==
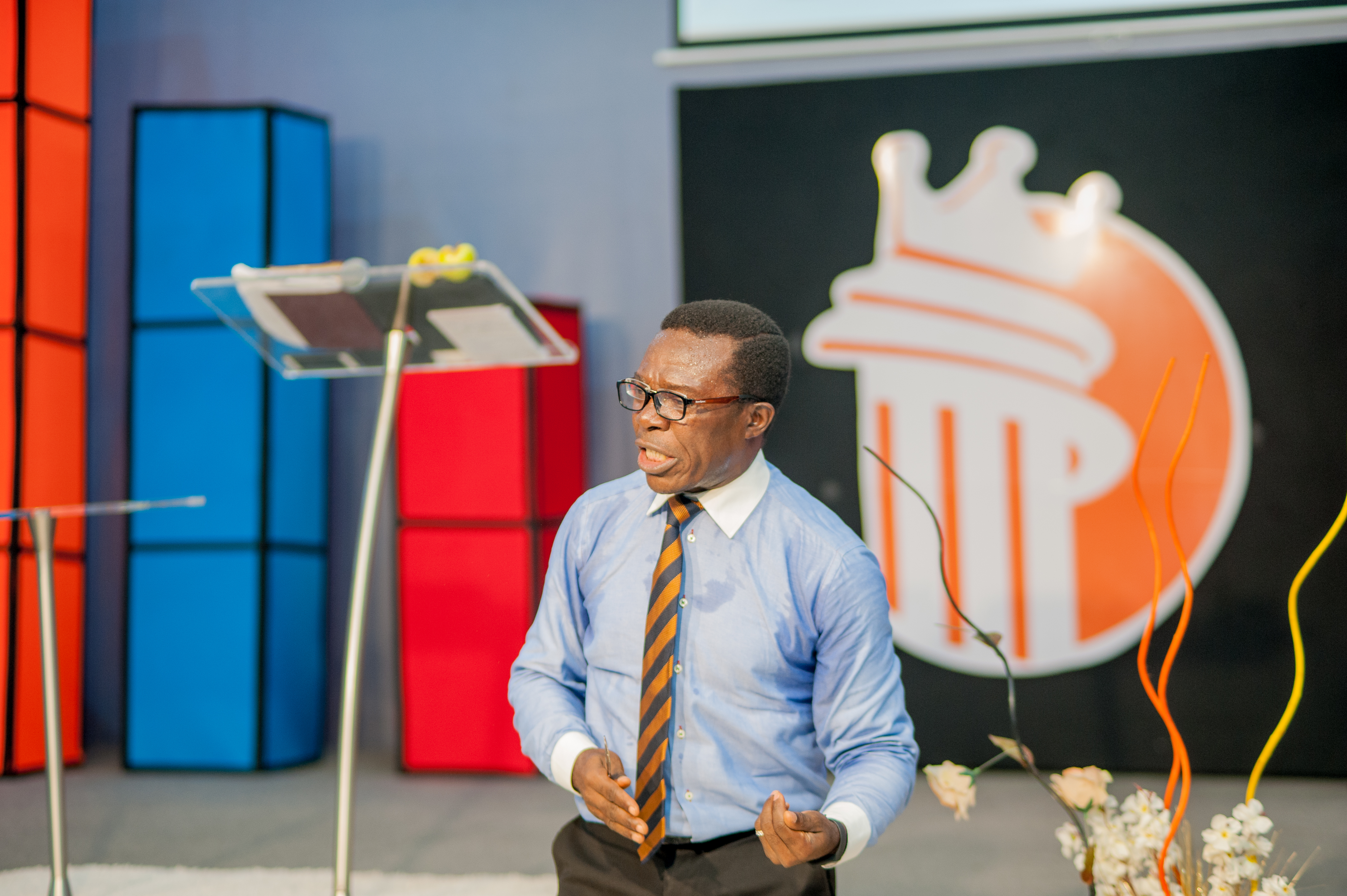
Maduka speaking at The Kings Heritage Church in Lagos, 2021

Cosmas Maduka is known for his Christian faith, and can be seen frequently preaching at church or youth conferences in Nigeria. According to Maduka he gave his life to Jesus early in life and this had tremendous positive impact on his life, in addition to listening to inspiration talks by the late Reverend William Marrion Branham. He was married to Charity Maduka (1958–2021), with four sons and a daughter. He lives in Lagos, Nigeria.

In 2015, Cosmos Maduka appeared on Forbes Africa Cover as the man who turned $1 to $500million, and during was featured in an exclusive interview of Forbes Africa TV Series “My Worst Day with Peace Hyde”.

According to Maduka he loves playing and watching football. He once disclosed during an interview that he has fondness for cars and motorcycles, remarking: "that his whole family are bikers".

== Awards ==
In 2003 Cosmas Maduka received an Honorary Doctor of Business Administration (PhD) University of Nigeria, Nsukka. Maduka also served as the President/Chairman of the Nigerian Table Tennis Federation for 16 years during which Nigeria led Africa in all the events. He led the Nigerian Team to the Olympic Games; Atlanta ‘96, Sydney 2000, Athens 2004 and Beijing 2008. In 2012 was inducted as a Harvard Business School Alumni having completed an Executive Education Program. Cosmos Maduka was honoured by President Goodluck Jonathan with the National Honours of the Commander of the Order of the Niger (CON) in 2012.
