= Owoh =

Owoh is a surname. Notable people with the surname include:

- Atisi Owoh (born 1979), Nigerian table tennis player
- Nkem Owoh (born 1958), Nigerian actor and comedian
- Orlando Owoh (1932–2008), Nigerian Yoruba musician
