= Table tennis at the 2007 All-Africa Games =

Table tennis was part of the 2007 All-Africa Games competition schedule.

== Results ==
=== Men ===
Event	Gold	Silver	Bronze
Singles	Segun Toriola; Nigeria	Monday Merotohun; Nigeria	El-Sayed Lashin; Egypt Kazeem Nosiru; Nigeria
Doubles	Segun Toriola; Monday Merotohun; Nigeria	El-Sayed Lashin; Ahmed Saleh; Egypt	Ahmed Nadim; Moselhi Emad; Egypt Kazeem Nosiru; Hakeem Hassa; Nigeria
Team	Egypt	Nigeria	Algeria

=== Women ===
Event	Gold	Silver	Bronze
Singles	Yang Fen; Congo	Bose Kaffo; Nigeria	Cecilia Offiong; Nigeria Olufunke Oshonaike; Nigeria
Doubles	Offiong Edem; Cecilia Offiong; Nigeria	Yang Fen; Fatimo Bisiriyu; Congo	Osman Bacent; Shaimaa Abdul-Aziz; Egypt Bose Kaffo; Olufunke Oshonaike; Nigeria
Team	Nigeria	Egypt	Tunisia

=== Mixed ===
Event	Gold	Silver	Bronze
Doubles	Yang Fen; Suraju Saka; Congo	Shaimaa Abdul-Aziz; Moselhi Emad; Egypt	Cecilia Offiong; Hakeem Hassan; Nigeria Bose Kaffo; Monday Merotohun; Nigeria
