= Africa Team Table Tennis Championships =

The Africa Team Table Tennis Championships is a Tournaments organized by the African Table Tennis Federation (ATTF) To Crown Africa Best Table tennis Nations.

== Medalists ==
Year	Men's team			Women's team		
Year	Gold	Silver	Bronze	Gold	Silver	Bronze
2016	Egypt			Egypt		
2015	Egypt			Egypt		
2012	Egypt			Egypt		
2010	Egypt			Nigeria		
2008	Nigeria			(Republic of the Congo); Congo		
2007	Egypt			Nigeria		
2004	Egypt			Egypt		
2002	Egypt			Egypt		
2000	Egypt			Egypt		
1998	Egypt			Egypt		
1996	Egypt			Egypt		
1994	Nigeria			Nigeria		
1992	Nigeria			Nigeria		
1990	Nigeria			Egypt		
1988	Nigeria			Nigeria		
1985	Nigeria			Nigeria		
1980	Nigeria			Nigeria		
1976	Nigeria			Nigeria		
1974	Nigeria			Nigeria		
1968	Nigeria			Egypt		
1964	Egypt			Egypt		
1962	Egypt			Egypt		
