= Wahid Enitan Oshodi =

Nigerian sports administrator

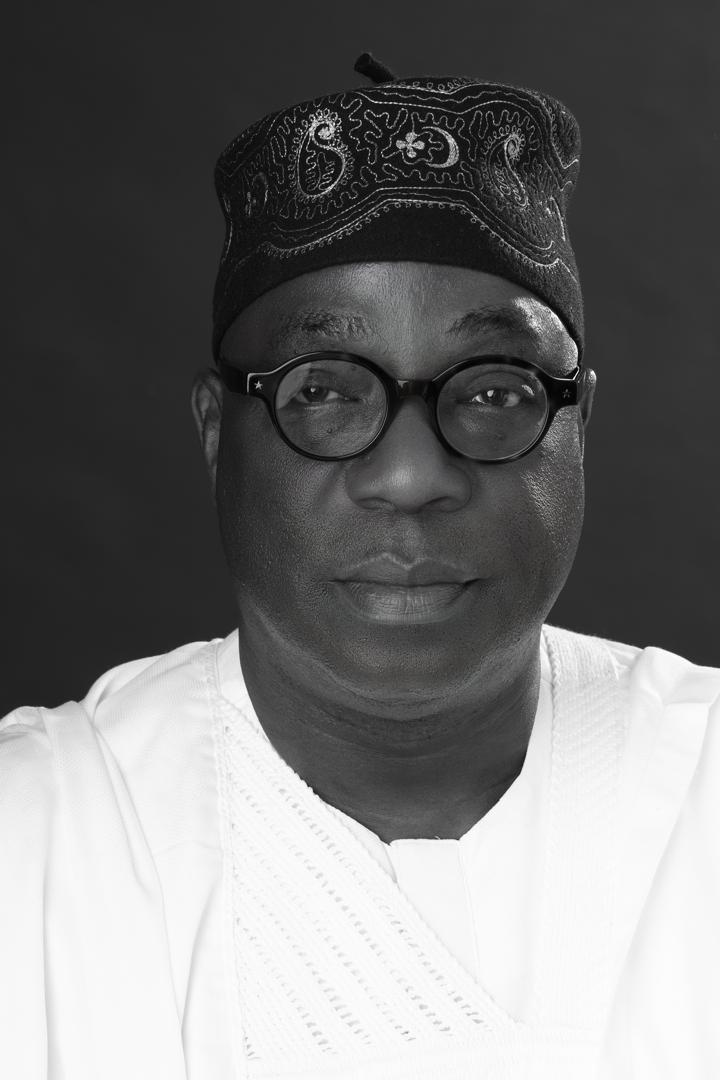
Photo

Wahid Enitan Oshodi (born May 5, 1967) is a Nigerian sports administrator, legal practitioner, and civil engineer. He is the President of the African Table Tennis Federation (ATTF) and an Executive Vice President of the International Table Tennis Federation (ITTF). He is a former Commissioner for Youth, Sports, and Social Development in Lagos State and a former President of the Nigerian Table Tennis Federation., a member of the Board of World Table Tennis (WTT), and Chairman of the Lagos State Sports Trust Fund (LSSTF) Board of Trustees.

== Career ==
Oshodi served as Commissioner for Youth, Sports, and Social Development in Lagos State from 2011, overseeing programs and infrastructure development. He organized the 2012 National Sports Festival, which showcased emerging talent. As President of the Nigerian Table Tennis Federation from 2013, he promoted youth development and international competitiveness, hosting international events like ITTF Challenger tournaments.

In 2016, Oshodi was elected Vice-President of ITTF Africa (Western Region), then Deputy President of the ATTF in 2021. He became President of the ATTF in 2024, focusing on increasing access and participation in table tennis across Africa. Since 2021, he has served as Executive Vice President of the ITTF.

=== Lagos State Sports Trust Fund ===
In January 2026, Oshodi was confirmed by the Lagos State House of Assembly as Chairman of the Board of Trustees of the Lagos State Sports Trust Fund (LSSTF) following his nomination by Governor Babajide Sanwo-Olu. The confirmation followed a screening exercise conducted by the Assembly."Lagos Assembly confirms Oshodi as LSSTF chairman". Punch Newspapers. 9 January 2026."Lagos Assembly Confirms Oshodi as Chairman, LSSTF Board". ThisDay. 8 January 2026."Lagos Assembly confirms Sanwo-Olu's nominee as STF BOT chair". The Guardian Nigeria. 8 January 2026.

=== World Table Tennis ===
In March 2026, Oshodi was appointed to the Board of World Table Tennis (WTT), the commercial arm of the International Table Tennis Federation. His appointment was confirmed following the first WTT Board meeting of 2026 held in Singapore. He became the first African to serve as a full director on the WTT Board."ITTF's Sörling and Oshodi Assume New Roles on WTT Board". International Table Tennis Federation. 13 March 2026."Nigeria's Wahid Oshodi secures landmark role on World Table Tennis Board". Premium Times. 17 March 2026."Wahid Oshodi becomes first African on World Table Tennis Board". TheCable. 15 March 2026.
