= Okenla =

Okenla is a surname. Notable people with the surname include:

- Foley Okenla (born 1967), Nigerian footballer
- Kehinde Okenla (born 1972), Nigerian table tennis player
