= Nehad Shehata =

Egyptian volleyball player (born 1975)

Personal information
- Full name: Nehad Mohamed Shehata Shehata
- Nationality: Egyptian
- Born: 25 February 1975 (age 51); Mansoura, Egypt
- Hometown: Giza, Egypt

Career
Teams
	Zamalek, Al-Gharafa, Petrojet

National team
From 1991 To 2004	Egypt

Nehad Shehata (born 25 February 1975) is a former Egyptian male volleyball player. He was included in the Egypt men's national volleyball team that finished 11th at the 2000 Summer Olympics in Sydney, Australia.

== See also ==
- Egypt at the 2000 Summer Olympics
