= Ahmed Baly =

Egyptian judoka

Ahmed Baly (born 3 February 1976) is an Egyptian judoka. He competed for Egypt at the 2000 Summer Olympics.

== Achievements ==
Year	Tournament	Place	Weight class
2000	African Judo Championships	3rd	Heavyweight (+100 kg)
1998	African Judo Championships	2nd	Heavyweight (+100 kg)
