= Sayed Khalil =

Egyptian volleyball player (born 1976)

Personal information
- Nationality: Egyptian
- Born: 23 December 1976 (age 49)

National team
2000	Egypt

Sayed Khalil (born 23 December 1976) is a former Egyptian male volleyball player. He was included in the Egypt men's national volleyball team that finished 11th at the 2000 Summer Olympics in Sydney, Australia.

== See also ==
- Egypt at the 2000 Summer Olympics
