= Peggy Regenwetter =

Luxembourgish table tennis player

Personal information
- Nationality: Luxembourgish
- Born: 16 February 1971 (age 54)

Sport
- Sport: Table tennis

Peggy Regenwetter (born 16 February 1971) is a Luxembourgish table tennis player. She competed in women's doubles at the 2000 Summer Olympics in Sydney.
