= Mahmoud Abdel Aziz (volleyball) =

Egyptian volleyball player (born 1975)

Personal information
- Nationality: Egyptian
- Born: 7 April 1975 (age 51)

National team
2000	Egypt

Mahmoud Abdel Aziz Rahman (born 7 April 1975) is an Egyptian former volleyball player. He was included in the Egypt men's national volleyball team that finished 11th at the 2000 Summer Olympics in Sydney. His brother was also part of the team.

== See also ==
- Egypt at the 2000 Summer Olympics
