= Mohamed Mouselhy =

Egyptian volleyball player (born 1972)

Mohamed Moselhy محمد مصيلحي

Personal information
- Full name: Mohamed Moselhy Tawfik Ebrahim
- Nickname: Medo
- Nationality: Egyptian
- Born: 7 January 1972 (age 54); Qalyubia, Egypt
- Hometown: Cairo, Egypt
- Height: 185 cm (6 ft 1 in)
- Education: Faculty of Physical Education Helwan University

Volleyball information
- Current club: El-Ahly
- Number: 11

Career
Years	Teams
1989-2006	Al Ahly (volleyball)

National team
2000	Egypt

Mohamed Moselhy (Arabic: محمد مصيلحي; born 7 January 1972) is the head coach of El-Ahly Volleyball team. he was a former Egyptian male volleyball player at El-Ahly for 20 years. He was included in the Egypt men's national volleyball team that finished 11th at the 2000 Summer Olympics in Sydney, Australia. His brother, Hany Mouselhy, was also part of the national volleyball team at the 2000 Summer Olympics.

== As a player ==
- Mohamed Moselhy began playing Volleyball in 1986 at "14 years old" in El-Ahly.
- He began playing with the first squad at El-Ahly, in 1989. He played 20 years with El-Ahly .
- From 1987-93 he was included in the Egyptian national youth team.
- He was the captain of the team until 2006.
- Moselhy played more than 350 international matches.

=== Trophies and awards ===
- Best Setter in Africa 1995
- Best Receiver in Africa 1997
- Best Player in Egypt 1999
- Best Arabian Server 2001
- Best Receiver in Egypt 2001

== See also ==
- Egypt at the 2000 Summer Olympics
