= Ussama Komsan =

Egyptian volleyball player (born 1977)

Personal information
- Nationality: Egyptian
- Born: 12 January 1977 (age 49)

Volleyball information

National team
- Years: Team
- 2000: Egypt

Ussama Komsan (born 12 January 1977) is a former Egyptian male volleyball player. He was included in the Egypt men's national volleyball team that finished 11th at the 2000 Summer Olympics in Sydney, Australia.

== See also ==
- Egypt at the 2000 Summer Olympics
