= South African Table Tennis Board =

- Sport: Table Tennis
- Jurisdiction: South Africa
- Abbreviation: SATTB
- Founded: 1948
- Affiliation: ITTF
- Affiliation date: 1950
- Headquarters: Pretoria
- President: Yusuf Carrim

Official website
- www.tabletennis.co.za
- (South Africa)

The South African Table Tennis Board (SATTB) is the national governing body responsible for table tennis in South Africa. The organisation has been affiliated to both the ITTF (International Table Tennis Federation) since 1950, and the African Table Tennis Federation. SATTB is based in Pretoria.

== History ==
The unification between the then South African Table Tennis Union (SATTU) founded in 1939 and the South African Table Tennis Board (SATTB) established in 1948 occurred in 1991. SATTU got affiliated to South African National Olympic Committee (SANOC) and the Confederation of South African Sports (COSAS), while SATTB got affiliated to the International Table Tennis Federation (ITTF), African Table Tennis Federation (ATTF), and National Olympic Sports Congress (NOSC). SATTB was a member of both the ITTF and ATTF during the apartheid-era period of isolation.

Subsequent to unification, South Africa received two wild cards to the 1992 Summer Olympics with Louis Boha (SATTU) and Cheryl Roberts (SATTB) as representatives. SATTB is registered with SASCOC as the officially recognised governing body.

== See also ==
- Sport in South Africa
