= Ethel Jacks =

Ghanaian tennis player

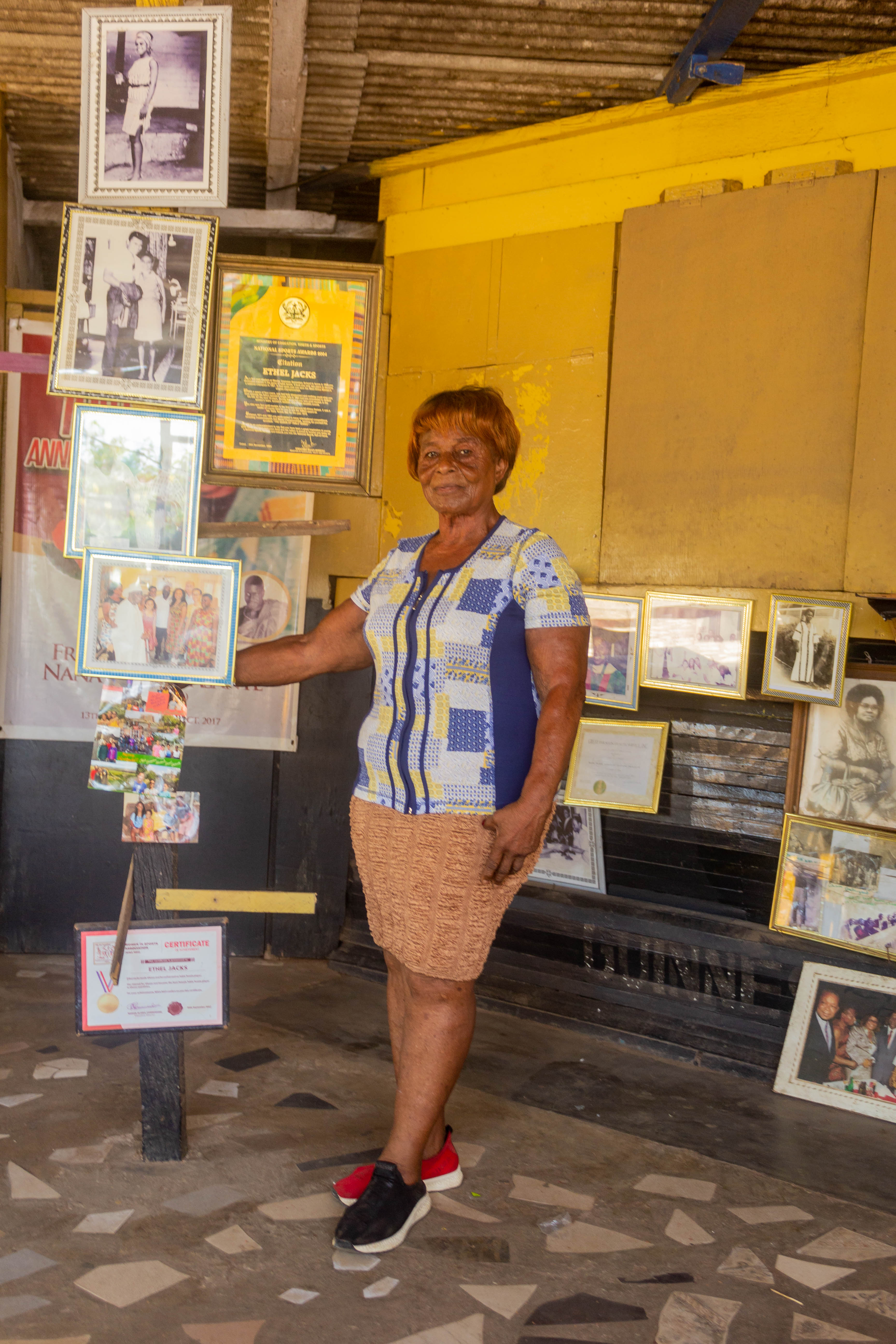
Ethel Jacks, former Ghanaian tennis player

Ethel Jacks is a former Ghanaian professional table tennis player who won three consecutive women's singles titles (1964, 1968, 1974) and three women's doubles titles (1964, 1968, 1976) at the African Table Tennis Championships. This feat earned her the nickname, Queen of African table tennis. She also competed at the 1961 World Championships. She was one of the Ghana tennis players who developed and trained under D. G. Hathiramani.

Born in Accra, Ghana , she represented her father's birth country at the 1976 African Championships.

== Awards ==
In April 2019, Ethel was awarded by Africa Table Tennis during the ITTF African, Youth, Junior and Cadet Championship held in Ghana for her contribution to the sports from the 1960s through 1970's.
