= Volleyball at the 2000 Summer Olympics – Men's team rosters =

Below are listed all participating squads of the 2000 Men's Olympic Volleyball Tournament. This 10th edition of the event, organised by the world's governing body, the FIVB, in conjunction with the IOC, was held in Australia's largest city, Sydney, from 17 September to 1 October 2000.

== Group A ==
=== Australia ===
#NR	NAME	BIRTHDATE
—	David Beard	1973-10-23
—	Benjamin Hardy	1974-09-21
—	Dan Howard	1976-12-13
—	Nathan Jakavicius	1977-09-24
—	Steve Keir	1979-11-08
—	Ben Loft	1978-10-09
—	Spiros Marazios	1978-12-11
—	Scott Newcomb	1973-09-27
—	Dan Ronan	1975-07-28
—	Hidde Van Beest	1979-07-20
—	Russell Wentworth	1973-04-07
—	Mark Williams	1979-03-27
Coach	Stelio de Rocco	1960-04-13

=== Brazil ===
#NR	NAME	BIRTHDATE
—	André Heller	1975-12-17
—	Dante Amaral	1980-09-30
—	Douglas Chiarotti	1970-11-10
—	Gilberto Godoy	1976-12-23
—	Giovane Gávio	1970-09-07
—	Gustavo Endres	1975-08-23
—	Gilmar Teixeira	1970-10-30
—	Marcelo Elgarten	1974-11-09
—	Mauricio Lima	1968-01-27
—	Max Pereira	1970-01-27
—	Nalbert Bitencourt	1974-03-09
—	Alexandre Samuel	1970-03-20
Coach	Radamés Lattari	1957

=== Cuba ===
Head coach: Juan Diaz Mariño

No.	Name	Date of birth	Height	2000 club
1	Leonel Marshall jr	5 September 1979	1.96 m (6 ft 5 in)	(Italy) Sarplast Livorno
2	Nicolas Vives	24 April 1970	1.89 m (6 ft 2 in)	(Cuba) Cienfuegos
5	Alexei Argilagos	28 July 1971	1.99 m (6 ft 6 in)	(Cuba) Camaguey
6	Ivan Benito Ruiz	26 March 1977	1.95 m (6 ft 5 in)	(Italy) Valleverde Ravenna
7	Angel Dennis	13 June 1977	1.93 m (6 ft 4 in)	(Italy) Iveco Palermo
8	Pavel Pimienta	2 August 1976	2.04 m (6 ft 8 in)	(Italy) Cosmogas Forli
9	Raúl Diago	1 June 1965	1.92 m (6 ft 4 in)	(Cuba) Matanzas
11	Osvaldo Hernández	11 July 1970	2.02 m (6 ft 8 in)	(Italy) Piaggio Roma
12	Ramon Gato	16 November 1973	1.92 m (6 ft 4 in)	(Cuba) Ciudad Habana
13	Alain Roca	7 September 1976	1.98 m (6 ft 6 in)	(Italy) Brescia Lat-Bossini Montichiari
14	Ihosvany Hernández	6 August 1972	2.06 m (6 ft 9 in)	(Italy) Piaggio Roma
16	Yosenki Garcia	17 January 1977	2.00 m (6 ft 7 in)	(Italy) Asystel Milano

=== Egypt ===
#NR	NAME	BIRTHDATE
—	Mohamed Moselhy	1972-01-07
—	Mahmoud Abdel Aziz	1975-04-07
—	Ashraf Abouel Hassan	1975-05-17
—	Eslam Awad	1976-08-05
—	Mohamed El-Husseini	1982-09-29
—	Hamdy El-Safy	1972-04-14
—	Ibrahim Fathy	1977-08-27
—	Sayed Khalil	1976-12-23
—	Ussama Komsan	1977-01-12
—	Hany Mouselhy	1968-06-24
—	Ibrahim Rashwan	1978-08-12
—	Nehad Shehata	1975-02-25
Coach

=== Netherlands ===
#NR	NAME	BIRTHDATE
—	Peter Blangé	1964-12-09
—	Albert Cristina	1970-11-18
—	Martijn Dieleman	1979-05-11
—	Guido Görtzen	1970-11-09
—	Joost Kooistra	1976-10-31
—	Misha Latuhihin	1970-12-26
—	Reinder Nummerdor	1976-09-10
—	Richard Schuil	1973-05-02
—	Bas van de Goor	1971-09-04
—	Mike van de Goor	1973-05-14
—	Martin van der Horst	1965-04-02
Coach	Toon Gerbrands	1957-10-31

=== Spain ===
#NR	NAME	BIRTHDATE
—	Carlos Carreño	1973-04-19
—	José Antonio Casilla	1979-08-29
—	Enrique de la Fuente	1975-08-11
—	Miguel Angel Falasca	1973-04-29
—	José Luis Moltó	1975-06-29
—	Rafael Pascual	1970-03-16
—	Cosme Prenafeta	1971-12-09
—	Juan Carlos Robles	1967-12-29
—	Ernesto Rodríguez	1969-01-15
—	Juan José Salvador	1975-12-18
—	Luis Pedro Suela	1976-07-07
—	Alexis Valido	1976-03-09
Coach	Raúl Lozano	1956-09-03

== Group B ==
=== Argentina ===
#NR	NAME	BIRTHDATE
—	Jerónimo Bidegain	1977-01-16
—	Hugo Conte	1963-04-14
—	Sebastián Firpo	1976-10-27
—	Christian Lares	1974-01-18
—	Leandro Maly	1976-01-29
—	Pablo Meana	1975-06-10
—	Marcos Milinkovic	1971-12-22
—	Leonardo Patti	1968-07-06
—	Pablo Pereira	1974-01-18
—	Juan Pablo Porello	1977-06-27
—	Alejandro Spajic	1976-05-07
—	Javier Weber	1966-01-06
Coach	Carlos Getzelevich

=== Italy ===
#NR	NAME	BIRTHDATE
—	Marco Bracci	1966-08-23
—	Mirko Corsano	1973-10-28
—	Alessandro Fei	1978-11-29
—	Andrea Gardini	1965-01-11
—	Andrea Giani	1970-04-22
—	Pasquale Gravina	1970-05-01
—	Luigi Mastrangelo	1975-08-17
—	Marco Meoni	1973-05-25
—	Samuele Papi	1973-05-20
—	Simone Rosalba	1976-01-31
—	Andrea Sartoretti	1971-06-19
—	Paolo Tofoli	1966-08-14
Coach	Andrea Anastasi	1960-10-08

=== Russia ===
#NR	NAME	BIRTHDATE
—	Igor Shulepov	1972-11-16
—	Valeri Goryushev	1973-04-26
—	Aleksandr Gerasimov	1975-01-22
—	Roman Yakovlev	1976-08-13
—	Vadim Khamuttskikh	1969-11-26
—	Aleksey Kuleshov	1979-02-24
—	Evgeni Mitkov	1972-03-23
—	Ruslan Olikhver	1969-04-11
—	Ilya Savelev	1971-06-10
—	Sergey Tetyukhin	1975-09-23
—	Konstantin Ushakov	1970-03-24
—	Aleksey Kazakov	1976-03-18
Coach	Guennadi Chipouline

=== South Korea ===
#NR	NAME	BIRTHDATE
—	Bang Ji-seop	1974-04-16
—	Bang Sin-bong	1975-02-06
—	Jang Byeong-cheol	1976-08-15
—	Choi Tae-ung	1976-04-09
—	Kim Se-jin	1974-01-30
—	Lee Byeong-yong	1971-05-11
—	Lee Ho	1973-04-24
—	Lee Gyeong-su	1979-04-27
—	Park Hui-sang	1972-08-01
—	Sin Jin-sik	1975-02-01
—	Sin Seon-ho	1978-05-28
—	Hu In-jeong	1974-04-19
Coach	Shin Chi-yong

=== United States ===
#NR	NAME	BIRTHDATE
#1	Lloy Ball	1972-02-17
#14	Kevin Barnett	1974-05-14
#12	Tom Hoff	1973-06-09
#7	John Hyden	1972-10-07
#3	Mike Lambert	1974-04-14
#16	Daniel Landry	1970-01-15
#10	Chip McCaw	1973-03-24
#9	Ryan Millar	1978-01-22
#13	Jeff Nygaard	1972-08-03
#15	George Roumain	1976-03-28
#5	Erik Sullivan	1972-08-09
#17	Andy Witt	1978-03-21
Coach	Doug Beal	1947-03-04

=== Yugoslavia ===
#NR	NAME	BIRTHDATE
—	Vladimir Batez	1969-09-07
—	Slobodan Boškan	1975-08-18
—	Andrija Gerić	1977-01-24
—	Nikola Grbić	1973-06-09
—	Vladimir Grbić	1970-12-14
—	Slobodan Kovač	1967-09-13
—	Đula Mešter	1972-04-03
—	Vasa Mijić	1973-04-11
—	Ivan Miljković	1979-09-13
—	Veljko Petković	1977-01-23
—	Goran Vujević	1973-2-27
—	Igor Vušurović	1974-09-24
Coach	Zoran Gajić	1958-12-28
