= Hany Mouselhy =

Egyptian volleyball player (born 1968)

Hany Moselhy هاني مصيلحي
Personal information
- Full name: Hany Moselhy Tawfik Ebrahim
- Nationality: Egyptian
- Born: 24 June 1968 (age 58) Qalyubia, Egypt
- Home town: Cairo, Egypt

Volleyball information
- Current club: Petrojet coach/National team U17 coach
- Number: 14

Career
- Years: Team
- –: Al Ahly, Al Gesh

National team
- Years: Team
- 2000: Egypt

Hany Mouselhy هاني مصيلحي (born 24 June 1968) is a former Egyptian male volleyball player. He was included in the Egypt men's national volleyball team that finished 11th at the 2000 Summer Olympics in Sydney, Australia. His brother is Mohamed Mouselhy. He was also part of the national volleyball team at the 2000 Summer Olympics.

== See also ==
- Egypt at the 2000 Summer Olympics
