= Judith Herczig =

Austrian table tennis player

Personal information
- Nationality: Austrian
- Born: 11 April 1976 (age 48); Budapest, Hungary

Sport
- Sport: Table tennis

Judith Herczig (born 11 April 1976) is an Austrian table tennis player. She competed in the women's doubles event at the 2000 Summer Olympics.
