= Kazeem Nosiru =

Nigerian table tennis player (born 1974)

Personal information
- Nationality: Nigeria
- Born: 25 November 1974 (age 51) Lagos, Nigeria
- Height: 1.65 m (5 ft 5 in)
- Weight: 70 kg (154 lb)

Sport
- Sport: Table tennis
- Club: Lascala Barcelona (ESP)
- Playing style: Right-handed, attacking
- Highest ranking: 187 (January 2001)
- Current ranking: 269 (September 2012)
Medal record
Men's table tennis
Representing Nigeria
All-Africa Games
Silver medal – second place	2007 Algiers	Team
Silver medal – second place	2011 Maputo	Team
Bronze medal – third place	2007 Algiers	Singles

Kazeem Nosiru (born 25 November 1974 in Lagos) is a Nigerian table tennis player. He shared a bronze medal triumph with Egypt's El-sayed Lashin in the men's singles at the 2007 All-Africa Games in Algiers, Algeria. As of September 2012, Nosiru is ranked no. 269 in the world by the International Table Tennis Federation (ITTF). He is a member of Lascala Sports Club in Barcelona, Spain, and is coached and trained by Obisanya Babatunde. Nosiru is also right-handed, and uses the attacking grip.

Nosiru made his official debut at the 2000 Summer Olympics in Sydney, where he competed only in the men's doubles. Playing with his partner and Olympic veteran Segun Toriola, Nosiru placed second in the preliminary pool round against the Netherlands' Trinko Keen and Danny Heister, and India's Chetan Baboor and Raman Subramanyam, with a total of 119 winning points, three games, and a single victory.

At the 2004 Summer Olympics in Athens, Nosiru teamed up with his new partner Peter Akinlabi in the men's doubles. The Nigerian duo defeated Chile's Juan Papic and Alejandro Rodríguez in the preliminary round, before losing out their next match to Danish pair Michael Maze and Finn Tugwell, with a set score of 2–4.

Eight years after competing in his first Olympics, Nosiru qualified for his third Nigerian team, as a 33-year-old, at the 2008 Summer Olympics in Beijing, by receiving a continental spot for Africa in the men's team under ITTF's Computer Team Ranking List. Nosiru joined with his fellow players Monday Merotohun and Segun Toriola for the inaugural men's team event. He and his team placed third in the preliminary pool round, earning a total of four points, two defeats (against Japan and Hong Kong), and a single defeat over the Russian team (led by Alexei Smirnov).
