= Ibrahim Rashwan =

Egyptian volleyball player (born 1978)

Personal information
- Nationality: Egyptian
- Born: 12 August 1978 (age 48)

National team
2000	Egypt

Ibrahim Rashwan (born 12 August 1978) is a former Egyptian male volleyball player. He was included in the Egypt men's national volleyball team that finished 11th at the 2000 Summer Olympics in Sydney, Australia.

== See also ==
- Egypt at the 2000 Summer Olympics
