= Accra Sports Stadium =

Stadium in Accra, Ghana

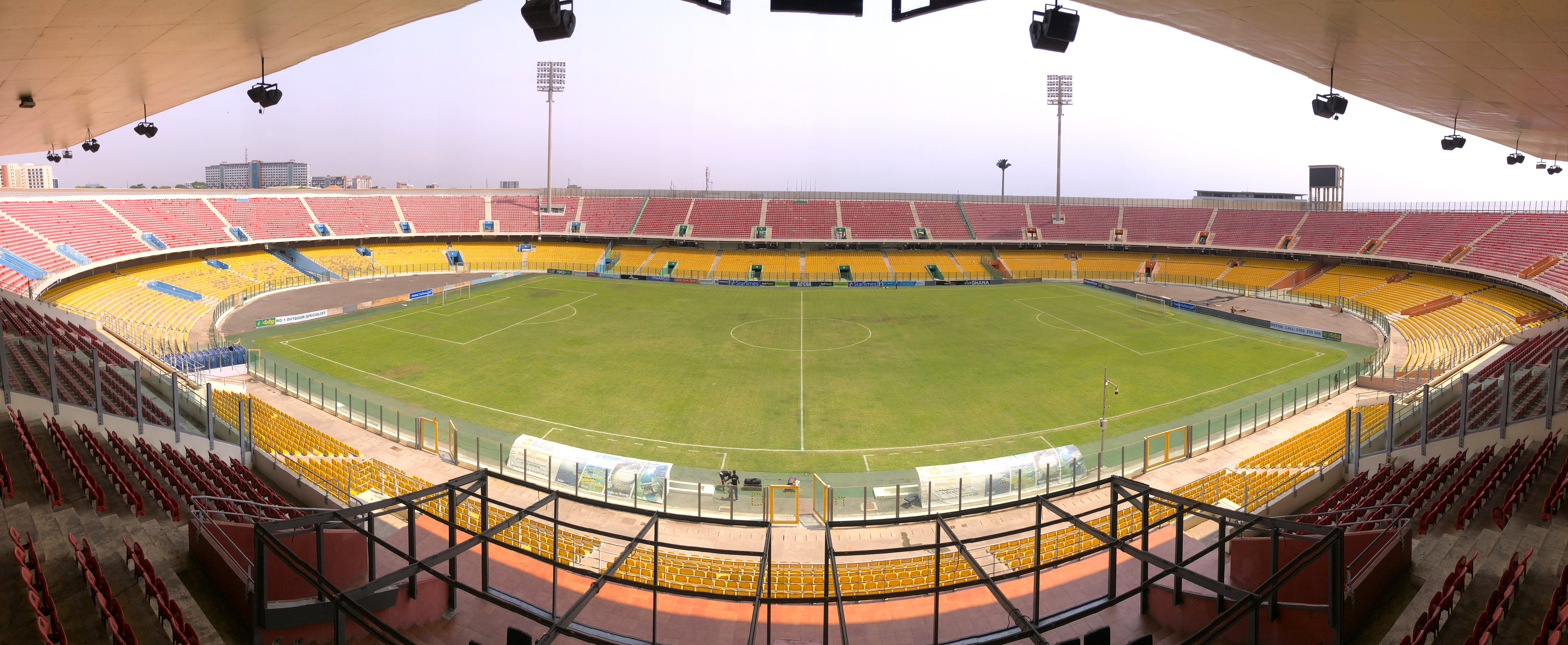
- Interactive map of Accra Sports Stadium
- Full name: Accra Sports Stadium
- Location: Accra, Ghana
- Coordinates: 05°33′05″N 00°11′31″W
- Capacity: 40,000
- Surface: Grass

Construction
- Opened: 1961
- Renovated: 2007
- Architect: Alexander Barov

Tenants
- Great Olympics; Hearts of Oak; Accra Lions; Ghana national football team

The Accra Sports Stadium, formerly named the Ohene Djan Stadium, is a multi-use stadium (40,000-capacity, all-seater) located in Accra, Ghana, mostly used for association football matches. It is also used for rugby union.

== Overview ==
The stadium was inaugurated in 1962 by a football match played between Accra XI and Kumasi XI. Originally known as the Accra Sports Stadium, the stadium was renamed after Ohene Djan, the country's first Director of Sports, in 2004 after renovations. Its renaming was quite controversial and opposed by the Ga people. There has been ongoing controversy about the name of the stadium. On 16 June 2011, the name 'Ohene Djan Stadium' on the stadium building was changed to 'Accra Sports Stadium' without any official announcement by the Accra Metropolitan Assembly supported by the National Democratic Congress Government. It has since been reverted.

As a designated venue of some of the 2008 African Cup of Nations matches, the stadium was rebuilt, upgraded, and modernized to meet FIFA standards. Work on the stadium was completed in October 2007. It was inaugurated with a four-nation tournament that Ghana won (the Zenith Cup).

The stadium is also the home of one of Africa's most popular clubs, Hearts of Oak as well as Accra Lions FC and Great Olympics, but Ghana's national team matches are sometimes played there.

During the 2000 African Cup of Nations in Ghana and Nigeria, the stadium hosted nine matches, and was also the venue of the 1978 final.

The venue has also hosted important professional boxing events, numbering 91 professional boxing programs as of August 2020. Perhaps the most famous one took place on Saturday, 6 November 1976, when Ghanaian David Kotei, the World Boxing Council's world Featherweight champion, lost his championship to future International Boxing Hall of Fame member, Mexican-American Danny Lopez by a 15 rounds unanimous decision. This program also featured a bout between undefeated, 29–0 prospect Sulley Shittu and Felix Figueroa, which Shittu won by 8 rounds decision. The crowd for this event has been estimated at over 100,000 fans.

The Sports hall at the stadium is the Dayaram Gangaram Hathiramani Sports Hall, named after D. G. Hathiramani who was influential in establishing table tennis in Ghana.

On 9 May 2001, the Accra Sports Stadium witnessed a disaster when a stampede occurred. A total of 127 people died and dozens more were injured after the incident. After 25 years since the incident, it has been described as Africa's worst football stadium tragedy.

The disaster occurred at the end of a match between Ghana Premier League rivals Asante Kotoko and Hearts of Oak when some supporters threw objects onto the pitch. The Police fired tear gas and as supporters attempted to escape from the stadium, it caused a stampede. Medical staff had reportedly left the stadium before the disaster occurred and many of the gates were also locked.

An inquiry conducted after the disaster blamed the police for overreacting with excessive force. The security personnel on duty were also accused of dishonesty and negligence. After the inquiry, six officers were charged with 127 counts of manslaughter although they were subsequently acquitted due to insufficient evidence.

== See also ==
- Accra Sports Stadium disaster
- Ghana national theatre
- Accra International Conference Center

== Notes and references ==
Preceded by Addis Ababa Stadium; Addis Ababa	African Cup of Nations; Final Venue; 1978	Succeeded by National Stadium; Lagos
Preceded by Cairo International Stadium; Cairo	African Cup of Nations; Final Venue; 2008	Succeeded by Estádio 11 de Novembro; Luanda
