= D. G. Hathiramani =

Dayaram Gangaram Hathiramani
- Born: Assam, India
- Died: 1987
- Occupation: Merchant
- Known for: Table tennis

Notes
- “the table tennis servant of Ghana”

Dayaram Gangaram Hathiramani was an Indian merchant, philanthropist and table tennis player and coach. He later naturalized as a Ghanaian. He was very instrumental in establishing the game of table tennis in Ghana. He first arrived in the Gold Coast in the late 1940s. He was one of the founders of the Gold Coast Table Tennis Association in 1951. He played the game himself and captained the Gold Coast team to win the Azikiwe Cup in Lagos, Nigeria. He quit playing and became a coach around 1954. He established a table tennis school in Accra and churned out a lot of stars who competed for Ghana and won various laurels. He sometimes sponsored players himself. In 1977 for example, an intensive course was organised for table tennis coaches in Accra. Some of the participants were housed at his home. One of his proteges was Ethel Jacks, who was African Tennis Champion on three occasions.

== Ghana table tennis after Hathiramani ==
After the death of Hathiramani, Ghana table tennis waned until a revival under Ebo Bartels and the Executors of D.G.Hathiramani's Estate.

== Honours ==
A general purpose sports hall at the Accra Sports Stadium is named after him. The D.G Hathiramani Memorial Open Championship held annually was instituted by the Ghana Table Tennis Association in his honour.

== Biography ==
- The Rise of Ghana Table Tennis - D.G. Hathiramani's Legacy

One of Hathiramani's tennis students, Emmanuel Kofi Asare, wrote about Hathiramani and his influence on the development of table tennis in Ghana.
