= Ibrahim Fathy =

Egyptian volleyball player (born 1977)

Personal information
- Nationality: Egyptian
- Born: 27 August 1977 (age 49)

National team
| 2000 | Egypt |

Ibrahim Fathy (born 27 August 1977) is a former Egyptian male volleyball player. He was included in the Egypt men's national volleyball team that finished 11th at the 2000 Summer Olympics in Sydney, Australia.

== See also ==
- Egypt at the 2000 Summer Olympics
