= Eslam Awad =

Egyptian volleyball player (born 1976)

Eslan Awad

Personal information
- Nationality: Egyptian
- Born: 5 August 1976 (age 50)

National team
2000	Egypt

Mohamed Eslan Awad (born 5 August 1976) is a former Egyptian male volleyball player. He was included in the Egypt men's national volleyball team that finished 11th at the 2000 Summer Olympics in Sydney, Australia.

== See also ==
- Egypt at the 2000 Summer Olympics
