= Mohamed El-Husseini =

Egyptian volleyball player (born 1982)

Personal information
- Nationality: Egyptian
- Born: 29 September 1982 (age 44)

National team
2000	Egypt

Mohamed El-Husseini or Mohamed El Houseny (born 29 September 1982) is a former Egyptian male volleyball player. He was included in the Egypt men's national volleyball team that finished 11th at the 2000 Summer Olympics in Sydney, Australia.

== See also ==
- Egypt at the 2000 Summer Olympics
