= Saber Hussein =

Egyptian handball player

Personal information
- Nationality: Egyptian
- Born: 20 February 1974 (age 52)

Sport
- Sport: Handball

Saber Hussein (born 20 February 1974) is an Egyptian handball player. He competed at the 1996 Summer Olympics, the 2000 Summer Olympics and the 2004 Summer Olympics.
