= Bacent Othman =

Egyptian table tennis player

Personal information
- Nationality: Egyptian
- Born: 23 August 1977 (age 48)
- Height: 1.70 m (5 ft 7 in)
- Weight: 60 kg (132 lb)

Sport
- Sport: Table tennis

Bacent Othman (Arabic: بسنت عثمان; born August 23, 1977, is an Egyptian table tennis player. Her highest career ITTF ranking was 256. She represented Egypt in 2000 Summer Olympics in Sydney, where she competed in women's doubles event in table tennis competition. She also participated in the 2005 and 2007 World Table Tennis Championships.

== Olympic participation ==
=== Sydney 2000 ===
==== Group stage – Group H ====
Rank	Athlete	W	L	GW	GL	PW	PL	BLR	SWE	EGY
1	Tatyana Kostromina and Viktoria Pavlovich (BLR)	2	0	4	1	101	79	X	2–1	2–0
2	Asa Svensson and Marie Svensson (SWE)	1	1	3	2	101	84	1–2	X	2–0
3	Shaimaa Abdul-Aziz and Bacent Othman (EGY)	0	2	0	4	45	84	0–2	0–2	X

Final Standing: 25T
