= African Table Tennis Federation =

International sports governing body

- Sport: Table tennis
- Jurisdiction: Africa
- Abbreviation: ATTF
- Founded: 15 december 1961
- Affiliation: ITTF
- Headquarters: Lagos, Nigeria
- President: Wahid Enitan Oshodi

Official website
- africa.ittf.com

The African Table Tennis Federation (ATTF) is one of the table tennis continental federations recognized by the International Table Tennis Federation (ITTF).

== History ==
=== The origin and the role of Amin Abou Heif ===
The idea of founding this continental federation was born as early as 1955, under the leadership of the Egyptian Amin Abou Heif. As the vice-president of the International Table Tennis Federation (ITTF), he was the main architect and the driving force behind the unification of table tennis in Africa, actively campaigning to bring the continent's sports organizations together.

=== Foundation ===
The continental federation was established in Cairo, Egypt, during a historic meeting helds from 5 to 15 december 1961 and that brought together a total of 18 founding nations. Anwar Sadat who later became the President of Egypt was elected as the organization's very first president. The following year, in 1962, the ATTF organized its first official African Championships in Alexandria.

=== The 18 founding countries ===
During the constitutive meeting held in Cairo from December 5 to 15, 1961, 18 nations answered the call to lay the foundation of the organization.

- United Arab Republic (Egypt): the host country and pivot of the initiative.
- Nigeria: whose national federation had existed since 1951.
- Ghana: highly active starting from the first championships in 1962.
- Morocco: ITTF member since 1958.
- South Africa: represented by its non-racial sports council at the time.
- Dahomey (Benin), Ethiopia, Libya, Madagascar, Mali, Mauritius, Niger, North Rhodesia (Zambia), Sierra Leone, Somalia, Sudan, Tanganyika (Tanzania), Togo, Uganda.

As well as several other pioneer nations from North, West, and East Africa involved in the post-independence sports movement. The ATTF was able to immediately launch its first competitions and establish itself as the official governing body for table tennis on the continent.

== Member Associations ==
The 54 member associations of the ATTF include:

- Algeria - Algerian Table Tennis Federation
- Angola - Federação Angolana de Tenis de Mesa
- Burundi - Fédération de Tennis de Table du Burundi
- Benin - Fédération Béninoise de Tennis de Table
- Botswana - Botswana Table Tennis Association
- Burkina Faso - Fédération Burkinabé de Tennis de Table
- Cameroon - Fédération Camerounaise de Tennis de Table
- Cape Verde - Associação Cabo-Verdiana de Ténis de Mesa
- Central African Republic - Fédération Centrafricaine du Tennis du Table
- Chad - Fédération Tchadienne de Tennis de Table
- Comoros - Fédération Comorienne de Tennis de Table
- Congo - Fédération Congolaise de Tennis de Table
- DR Congo - Fédération de Tennis de Table du Congo
- Djibouti - Djiboutian Table Tennis Federation
- Egypt - Egyptian Table Tennis Federation
- Equatorial Guinea - Federación Ecuatoguineana Tenis de Mesa
- Eritrea - Eritrean National Table Tennis Federation
- Eswatini - Eswatini Table Tennis Association
- Ethiopia - Ethiopian Table Tennis Federation
- Gabon - Fédération Gabonaise de Tennis de Table
- Gambia - The Gambia Table Tennis Association
- Ghana - Ghana Table Tennis Association
- Guinea - Fédération Guinéenne de Tennis de Table
- Guinea-Bissau - Federação de Ténis de Mesa da Guiné-Bissau
- Ivory Coast - Fédération Ivoirienne de Tennis de Table
- Kenya - Kenya Table Tennis Association
- Lesotho - Lesotho Table Tennis Association
- Liberia - Liberia National Table Tennis Association
- Libya - Libyan Arab Table Tennis Federation
- Madagascar - Fédération Malgache de Tennis de Table
- Malawi - Table Tennis Association of Malawi
- Mali - Federation Malienne de Tennis de Table
- Morocco - Fédération Royale Marocaine de Tennis de Table
- Mauritania - Fédération Nationale de Tennis de Table de Mauritanie
- Mauritius - Mauritius Table Tennis Association
- Mozambique - Mozambican Table Tennis Federation
- Namibia - Namibia Table Tennis Association
- Niger - Fédération Nigérienne de Tennis de Table
- Nigeria - Nigeria Table Tennis Federation
- Rwanda - Federation Rwandaise de Tennis de Table
- São Tomé and Príncipe - Federação Ténis Mesa de São Tomé e Principe
- Senegal - Fédération Sénégalaise de Tennis de Table
- Seychelles - Seychelles Table Tennis Associaton
- Sierra Leone - Sierra Leone Table Tennis Association
- Somalia - Somali Table Tennis Association
- South Africa - South African Table Tennis Board
- South Sudan - South Sudan Table Tennis Federation
- Sudan - Sudan Table Tennis Association
- Tanzania - Tanzania Table Tennis Association
- Togo - Fédération Togolaise de Tennis de Table
- Tunisia - Fédération Tunisienne de Tennis de Table
- Uganda - Uganda Table Tennis Association
- Zambia - Zambia Table Tennis Association
- Zimbabwe - Zimbabwe Table Tennis Union

== Competitions ==
The ATTF authorises the following competitions:

=== Nations ===
- African Table Tennis Championships
- ITTF Africa Cup
- African Games (Table tennis tournament)
- African Para Table Tennis Championships

=== Clubs ===
- African Table Tennis Club Championships (ITTF African Club Championships)
