= Yang Fen =

Chinese-born Congolese table tennis player

Personal information
- Native name: 楊芬
- Nationality: Republic of the Congo
- Born: 31 July 1982 (age 43) Hubei, China
- Height: 1.70 m (5 ft 7 in)
- Weight: 50 kg (110 lb)

Sport
- Sport: Table tennis
Medal record
Women's table tennis
Representing Republic of the Congo
All-Africa Games
Gold medal – first place	2007 Algiers	Singles
Gold medal – first place	2007 Algiers	Team
Silver medal – second place	2007 Algiers	Doubles

Yang Fen (born July 31, 1982 in Hubei, China) is a Chinese-born Congolese table tennis player. She is also a three-time medalist at the 2007 All-Africa Games in Algiers, Algeria.

Yang represented the Republic of the Congo at the 2008 Summer Olympics in Beijing, where she competed in the women's singles. Yang reached the second preliminary round of the competition, where she lost to Romania's Elizabeta Samara, with a set score of 1–4.
