= Kazuko Naito =

Japanese table tennis player

Personal information
- Nationality: Japanese
- Born: 15 October 1973 (age 51)

Sport
- Sport: Table tennis

Kazuko Naito (born 15 October 1973) is a Japanese table tennis player. She competed in the women's doubles event at the 2000 Summer Olympics.
