= Adeyemo Fatai =

Nigerian table tennis player

Personal information
- Nationality: Nigeria
- Born: 26 October 1961 (age 64)

Sport
- Sport: Table tennis
Medal record
Men's table tennis
Representing Nigeria
African Championships
Bronze medal – third place	1994 Cairo	Singles
Gold medal – first place	1994 Cairo	Doubles
Silver medal – second place	1994 Cairo	Mixed Doubles
Gold medal – first place	1994 Cairo	Team
Bronze medal – third place	1988 Lagos	Singles
Silver medal – second place	1988 Lagos	Doubles
Silver medal – second place	1988 Lagos	Mixed Doubles
Gold medal – first place	1988 Lagos	Team
Bronze medal – third place	1985 Alexandria	Singles
Gold medal – first place	1985 Alexandria	Team

Adeyemo Fatai (born 26 October 1961) is a Nigerian table tennis player. Between 1985 and 1994, he won several medals in singles, doubles, and team events in the African Table Tennis Championships. He competed in men's doubles at the 1988 Summer Olympics.

== See also ==
- List of table tennis players
