= Chris Xu (table tennis) =

Canadian table tennis player

Personal information
- Born: 4 February 1969 (age 57) Harbin, China

Sport
- Sport: Table tennis
Medal record
Women's table tennis
Representing Canada
Pan American Games
Gold medal – first place	1995 Mar del Plata	Team
Silver medal – second place	1999 Winnipeg	Team
Silver medal – second place	2007 Rio de Janeiro	Team

Chris Xu (born 4 February 1969), born Xu Guanghong (Chinese: 徐光宏; pinyin: Xú Guānghóng), is a Chinese-born table tennis player who represented Canada at the 2000 Summer Olympics. Her doubles partner Xiao-Xiao Wang was also from her hometown Harbin in China.
