= Jolanta Prūsienė =

Lithuanian table tennis player (born 1965)

Personal information
- Full name: Jolanta Danilevičiūtė-Prūsienė
- Nationality: Lithuania
- Born: 30 November 1965 (age 60) Kaunas, Lithuanian SSR, Soviet Union

Sport
- Sport: Table tennis
Medal record
Women's table tennis
Representing Lithuania
European Championships
Bronze medal – third place	1994 Birmingham	Doubles
Bronze medal – third place	1996 Bratislava	Doubles
Bronze medal – third place	2002 Zagreb	Doubles

Jolanta Prūsienė (born 30 November 1965) is a Lithuanian table tennis player. She is 3 times overall, 9 times singles, 14 times doubles and 7 times mixed doubles Lithuanian champion.

She competed at the 2000 Summer Olympics, reaching the top 16 in doubles competition.
