= Hussain Said =

Egyptian handball player

Personal information
- Nationality: Egyptian
- Born: 10 January 1977 (age 48)

Sport
- Sport: Handball

Hussain Said (born 10 January 1977) is an Egyptian handball player. He competed in the men's tournament at the 2000 Summer Olympics.
