= Shahira El-Alfy =

Egyptian table tennis player

Personal information
- Native name: شهيرة الألفي
- Nationality: Egypt
- Born: 22 February 1977 (age 49)
- Height: 1.74 m (5 ft 8 1/2 in)
- Weight: 60 kg (132 lb)

Sport
- Sport: Table tennis
- Club: Zamalek SC (Egypt), Al Gezira sporting club (Egypt), Al Ahly (Egypt)

Shahira Abdulhakim El-Alfy (Arabic: شهيرة الألفي; born February 22, 1977) is an Egyptian table tennis player. She represented Egypt in 2000 Summer Olympics in Sydney, where she competed in women's singles event in table tennis competition. She won the gold medal at the 2000 African Table Tennis Championships, in both the women's singles and women's teams events. She also won the ITTF African Cup in Nairobi in 1999.

== Olympic participation ==
=== Sydney 2000 ===
Group stage – Group O

Rank	Athlete	W	L	GW	GL	PW	PL	SWE	BLR	EGY
1	Åsa Svensson (SWE)	2	0	6	1	142	99	X	3–1	3–0
2	Viktoria Pavlovich (BLR)	1	1	4	3	133	111	1–3	X	3–0
3	Shahira El-Alfy (EGY)	0	2	0	6	61	126	0–3	0–3	X

Final Standing: 49T
