= Monday Merotohun =

Nigerian table tennis player

Personal information
- Nationality: Nigeria
- Born: 2 November 1977 (age 48) Ado-Odo, Ogun, Nigeria
- Height: 1.75 m (5 ft 9 in)
- Weight: 88 kg (194 lb)

Sport
- Sport: Table tennis
- Club: AS TT Sport Club Etna; Riposto
- Playing style: Right-handed, shakehand
- Highest ranking: 184 (August 2002)
- Current ranking: 292 (September 2012)
Medal record
Men's table tennis
Representing Nigeria
All-Africa Games
Gold medal – first place	2007 Algiers	Doubles
Silver medal – second place	2007 Algiers	Singles
Silver medal – second place	2007 Algiers	Team
Silver medal – second place	2011 Maputo	Mixed doubles

Monday Merotohun (born 2 November 1977 in Ado-Odo, Ogun) is a Nigerian table tennis player. Playing with his partner Segun Toriola, Merotohun defeated Egypt's El-sayed Lashin and Ahmed Saleh for the gold medal in the men's doubles at the 2007 All-Africa Games in Algiers, Algeria. As of September 2012, Merotohun is ranked no. 184 in the world by the International Table Tennis Federation (ITTF). He is a member of AS TT Sport Club Etna Riposto in Catania, Sicily, Italy, and is coached and trained by Obisanya Babatunde. Merotohun is also right-handed, and uses the shakehand grip.

Merotohun made his official debut at the 2004 Summer Olympics in Athens, where he competed in both the singles and doubles tournaments. For his first event, the men's singles, Merotohun defeated Democratic Republic of the Congo's Momo Babungu in the preliminary round, before losing out his next match to Swedish table tennis player and five-time Olympian Jörgen Persson, with a set score of 1–4. Merotohun also teamed up with four-time Olympian Segun Toriola in the men's doubles, where they lost the first round match to the U.S. pair, Mark Hazinski and Ilija Lupulesku (former Olympic silver medalist from Serbia), receiving a unanimous set score of 0–4.

Four years after competing in his first Olympics, Merotohun qualified for his second Nigerian team, as a 30-year-old, at the 2008 Summer Olympics in Beijing, by placing second from the men's singles from the All-Africa Games, and receiving a continental spot for Africa in the men's team under ITTF's Computer Team Ranking List. Merotohun joined with his fellow players Kazeem Nosiru and Segun Toriola for the inaugural men's team event. He and his team placed third in the preliminary pool round, earning a total of four points, two defeats (against Japan and Hong Kong), and a single victory over the Russian team (led by Alexei Smirnov). In the men's singles, Merotohun lost the preliminary round match to Turkey's Cem Zeng, with a set score of 2–4.
