= Atanda Musa =

Nigerian table tennis player (born 1960)

Personal information
- Full name: Atanda Ganiyu Musa
- Born: 3 February 1960 (age 66) Nigeria
Medal record
Men's table tennis
Representing Nigeria
All-Africa Games
Gold medal – first place	1991 Cairo	Singles
Gold medal – first place	1991 Cairo	Doubles
Gold medal – first place	1991 Cairo	Mixed doubles
Gold medal – first place	1987 Nairobi	Singles
Gold medal – first place	1987 Nairobi	Doubles
Gold medal – first place	1987 Nairobi	Mixed doubles
Silver medal – second place	1978 Algiers	Singles
Commonwealth Championships
Gold medal – first place	1985 Isle of Man	Doubles
Gold medal – first place	1982 India	Singles
Gold medal – first place	1982 India	Doubles

Atanda Ganiyu Musa (born 3 February 1960) is a Nigerian table tennis player. He represented Nigeria at two Summer Olympics in 1988 and 1992, taking part in both the singles and doubles events. He was once ranked 20th in the world at his peak.

In 1982, he won the table tennis singles event at the Commonwealth Table Tennis Championships, before partnering with Sunday Eboh to take the doubles gold in the same discipline.

Along with Francis Sule, Atanda, again, won the table tennis doubles gold medal at the 1985 Commonwealth Table Tennis Championships. He achieved a clean sweep of gold in each of the singles, men's doubles and mixed doubles events representing Nigeria at the 1987 All-Africa Games. In 1991, with Bose Kaffo as partner, he won the Commonwealth Games' Mixed Doubles event for table tennis.

Musa was a table tennis player from Africa. His backhand play and loop technique were noted aspects of his playing style. He played in various countries, including during later career in Alicante, Spain.

Besides playing, the 10-time African Men's Table Tennis Singles Champion, has always liked coaching. In 1992 he became a full-time coach in Saudi Arabia for three years. In 1995 he was hired to coach in Qatar at the Ali club. In 1997 he returned to Nigeria, where he continued to play and coach before moving permanently to the US.

Atanda Ganiyu Musa has coached various notable individuals, including celebrities such as Susan Sarandon, Drew Barrymore and Nancy Pelosi, in addition to his successful coaching career. Musa's coaching style emphasizes hard work, discipline, and dedication, with a focus on developing players' skills and helping them reach their full potential. He currently resides in New York City where he coaches in his spare time at SPIN.
