= Xiao-Xiao Wang =

Canadian table tennis player

Xiao-Xiao Wang (born 12 April 1981) is a Chinese-born table tennis player who represented Canada at the 2000 Summer Olympics. Her doubles partner Chris Xu was also from her hometown Harbin in China.
