= Eldijana Aganović =

Croatian table tennis player (born 1971)

Personal information
- Nationality: Croatia
- Born: 20 November 1971 (age 53); Foča, SR Bosnia and Herzegovina, SFR Yugoslavia
- Height: 1.73 m (5 ft 8 in)
- Weight: 59 kg (130 lb)

Sport
- Sport: Table tennis

Eldijana Dana Aganović-Bentsen (born 20 November 1971) is a Croatian table tennis player. She competed in the 1996 and 2000 Summer Olympics.
