= Nigerian Table Tennis Federation =

Sports governing body in Nigeria

- Sport: Table Tennis
- Jurisdiction: Nigeria
- Abbreviation: NTTF
- Founded: 1951
- Affiliation: International Table Tennis Federation (ITTF)
- President: Ishaku Tikon

Official website
- www.nttf.com.ng

The Nigeria Table Tennis Federation (NTTF) is the governing body responsible for the development and promotion of table tennis in Nigeria. It oversees the organization and management of the national table tennis team for local and international competitions. The NTTF is recognized by the International Table Tennis Federation (ITTF). The current president of the NTTF is Ishaku Tikon.

== History ==
The Nigeria table tennis federation was formed in 1951 by Jack W. Farnsworth with its headquarters in Lagos state.
