= Atisi Owoh =

Nigerian table tennis player

Personal information
- Nationality: Nigerian
- Born: 22 February 1979 (age 46)

Sport
- Sport: Table tennis

Atisi Owoh (born 22 February 1979) is a Nigerian table tennis player. She competed in the women's doubles event at the 2000 Summer Olympics.
