= Stella Zhou =

Chinese table tennis player

Stella Zhou (born 3 May 1973), born Xi Tao Zhou (Chinese: 周曦涛; pinyin: Zhōu Xītāo), is a Chinese-born table tennis player who represented Australia at the 1996 and 2000 Olympics. At the 2000 Olympics, Zhou and her teammate Miao Miao finished 5th in the women's doubles, Australia's best Olympic table tennis result to that point.

She is the elder sister of teammate Shirley Zhou.
