= Kehinde Okenla =

Nigerian table tennis player

Personal information
- Nationality: Nigerian
- Born: 16 November 1972 (age 52)

Sport
- Sport: Table tennis

Kehinde Okenla (born 16 November 1972) is a Nigerian table tennis player. She competed in the women's doubles event at the 2000 Summer Olympics.
