= Abiola Odumosu =

Nigerian table tennis player

Personal information
- Nationality: Nigerian
- Born: 31 October 1973 (age 51)

Sport
- Sport: Table tennis

Abiola Olawunmi Odumosu (born 31 October 1973) is a Nigerian table tennis player. She competed in the women's singles event at the 1992 Summer Olympics.
