= Ashraf Helmy =

Egyptian table tennis player

Personal information
- Nationality: Egyptian
- Born: 24 April 1967 (age 59) Cairo, Egypt

Sport
- Sport: Table tennis

Ashraf Helmy (born 24 April 1967) is an Egyptian table tennis player. He competed at the 1988 Summer Olympics, the 1992 Summer Olympics, and the 2000 Summer Olympics.

He was mentioned in S4 E12 of the American version of The Office as one of the heroes of the character Dwight Schrute
