= Bose Kaffo =

Nigerian table tennis player

Personal information
- Born: 14 November 1972 (age 53) Surulere, Lagos State, Nigeria
- Height: 165 cm (5 ft 5 in)
- Weight: 62 kg (137 lb)

Sport
- Sport: Table tennis
- Club: Marmande Table Tennis Club
Medal record
Women's table tennis
Representing Nigeria
All-Africa Games
Gold medal – first place	1991 Cairo	Mixed doubles
Gold medal – first place	1995 Harare	Singles
Gold medal – first place	1995 Harare	Doubles
Gold medal – first place	1995 Harare	Mixed doubles
Gold medal – first place	1999 Johannesburg	Doubles
Gold medal – first place	1999 Johannesburg	Mixed doubles
Gold medal – first place	2003 Abuja	Doubles
Silver medal – second place	1987 Nairobi	Doubles
Silver medal – second place	1991 Cairo	Doubles
Silver medal – second place	1999 Johannesburg	Singles
Silver medal – second place	2003 Abuja	Mixed doubles
Silver medal – second place	2007 Algiers	Singles
Bronze medal – third place	1987 Nairobi	Mixed doubles
Bronze medal – third place	1991 Cairo	Singles
Bronze medal – third place	2003 Abuja	Singles
Bronze medal – third place	2007 Algiers	Doubles
Bronze medal – third place	2007 Algiers	Mixed doubles

Bose Kaffo (born 14 November 1972 in Surulere, Lagos State, Nigeria) is a Nigerian professional table tennis player who competed at five Olympics from 1992 to 2008.

She is the second Nigerian woman to compete at five Olympics, after sprinter Mary Onyali. This feat was also achieved in 2008 by fellow table tennis player Segun Toriola. By the end of the 2008 Summer Olympics, only thirteen table tennis players worldwide had appeared at least five Olympics. Her doubles partners at the Olympics were Abiola Odumosu in 1992 and Olufunke Oshonaike from 1996 to 2004.

She has won fifteen medals (seven gold) in singles and doubles at six consecutive All-Africa Games from 1987 to 2007, winning at least one medal at each Games. In Singles, she won gold in 1995, silver in 1999 and 2007, and bronze in 2003. In Doubles, she won gold (with Olufunke Oshonaike) in 1995, 1999, and 2003, silver in 1991, and bronze in 2007. In Mixed Doubles, she won gold in 1991 (with Atanda Musa), 1995 (with Sule Olayele), and 1999 (with Segun Toriola) along with silver in 1987 and 2003 and bronze in 2007. Nigeria has won team gold at all All-Africa Games.

== See also ==
- List of athletes with the most appearances at Olympic Games

Olympic Games
Preceded by Mary Onyali-Omagbemi	Flagbearer for Nigeria; Beijing 2008	Succeeded by Sinivie Boltic
