= Sule Olaleye =

Nigerian table tennis player

Personal information
- Nationality: Nigerian
- Born: 10 October 1967 (age 58)

Sport
- Sport: Table tennis

Sule Olaleye (born 10 October 1967) is a Nigerian table tennis player. He competed at the 1992 Summer Olympics and the 1996 Summer Olympics.
