= Shaimaa Abdul-Aziz =

Egyptian table tennis player (born 1981)

Personal information
- Full name: Shaimaa Abdul-Aziz Muhammad
- Nationality: Egypt
- Born: 30 March 1981 (age 45) Giza, Egypt
- Height: 1.60 m (5 ft 3 in)
- Weight: 53 kg (117 lb)

Sport
- Sport: Table tennis
- Club: Al-Ahly Sports Club
- Playing style: Right-handed, classic
- Highest ranking: 318 (May 2001)
- Current ranking: 566 (March 2013)
Medal record
Women's table tennis
Representing Egypt
All-Africa Games
Silver medal – second place	2007 Algiers	Mixed doubles
Silver medal – second place	2007 Algiers	Team
Bronze medal – third place	2007 Algiers	Doubles

Shaimaa Abdul-Aziz Muhammad (Arabic: شيماء عبد العزيز; born 30 March 1981 in Giza) is an Egyptian table tennis player. She won a silver medal, along with her partner Moselhi Emad, in the mixed doubles at the 2007 All-Africa Games in Algiers, Algeria. As of March 2013, Abdul-Aziz is ranked no. 566 in the world by the International Table Tennis Federation (ITTF). She is also right-handed, and uses the classic grip.

Abdul-Aziz made her official debut, as a 19-year-old, at the 2000 Summer Olympics in Sydney, where she competed in both singles and doubles tournaments. For her first event, the women's singles, Abdul-Aziz placed third in the preliminary pool round against Russia's Galina Melnik and Hong Kong's Wong Ching, receiving a total score of 74 points, and two straight losses. In the women's doubles, Abdul-Aziz and her partner Osman Bacent repeated their position in the preliminary pool round against Sweden's Åsa and Marie Svensson, and Belarus' Viktoria Pavlovich and Tatyana Kostromina, attaining only a total score of 45 points and losing four straight matches.

Eight years after competing in her last Olympics, Abdul-Aziz qualified for her second Egyptian team, as a 27-year-old, at the 2008 Summer Olympics in Beijing, by receiving a place as one of the top 6 seeded players from the All-Africa Games in Algiers, Algeria. She lost the preliminary round match of the women's singles tournament to Chinese Taipei's Pan Li-chun, with a unanimous set score of 0–4.
