= Algeria at the 2004 Summer Olympics =

- IOC code: ALG
- NOC: Algerian Olympic Committee
- Website: www.coa.dz

in Athens
- Competitors: 61 in 10 sports
- Flag bearer: Djabir Saïd-Guerni
- Medals: Gold 0 Silver 0 Bronze 0 Total 0

Summer Olympics appearances (overview)
- 1964; 1968; 1972; 1976; 1980; 1984; 1988; 1992; 1996; 2000; 2004; 2008; 2012; 2016; 2020; 2024

Other related appearances
- France (1896–1960)

Algeria competed at the 2004 Summer Olympics in Athens, Greece from 13 to 29 August 2004. It first competed in the Olympics in 1964, and entered the 2004 Athens Games having won a total of twelve medals — including one gold, one silver, and three bronze medals at the 2000 Summer Olympics. These medals were in athletics (three gold, one silver, two bronze) and boxing (one gold, five bronze). 61 competitors, 46 men and 15 women, took part in 57 events in 10 sports.

== Athletics ==
Algerian athletes have so far achieved qualifying standards in the following athletics events (up to a maximum of 3 athletes in each event at the 'A' Standard, and 1 at the 'B' Standard).

Key

- Note–Ranks given for track events are within the athlete's heat only
- Q = Qualified for the next round
- q = Qualified for the next round as a fastest loser or, in field events, by position without achieving the qualifying target
- NR = National record
- N/A = Round not applicable for the event
- Bye = Athlete not required to compete in round

Men
Track & road events

Athlete	Event	Heat		Quarterfinal		Semifinal		Final	
Athlete	Event	Result	Rank	Result	Rank	Result	Rank	Result	Rank
Khoudir Aggoune	5000 m	13:29.37	10	—				Did not advance	
Moussa Aouanouk	20 km walk	—						1:28:38	31
Saïd Belhout	Marathon	—						2:22:32	49
Mustapha Bennacer	Marathon	—						DNF	
Tarek Boukensa	1500 m	3:37.94	5 Q	—		DNF		Did not advance	
Kamal Boulahfane	1500 m	3:38.59	4 Q	—		3:41.27	5 Q	3:39.02	11
Adem Hecini	400 m	46.50	5	—		Did not advance			
Mohamed Khaldi	1500 m	3:42.47	12	—		Did not advance			
Malik Louahla	200 m	20.67	2 Q	20.93	7	Did not advance			
Abdelhakim Maazouz	3000 m steeplechase	8:36.12	11	—				Did not advance	
Nabil Madi	800 m	1:47.50	5	—		Did not advance			
Samir Moussaoui	5000 m	13:24.98	8 q	—				14:02.01	14
Djabir Saïd-Guerni	800 m	1:45.90	3 q	—		1:45.80	1 Q	1:45.61	7
Ali Saidi Sief	5000 m	13:18.94	1 Q	—				13:32.57	10
Rachid Ziar	Marathon	—						DNF	

Field events

Athlete	Event	Qualification		Final	
Athlete	Event	Distance	Position	Distance	Position
Abderrahmane Hammad	High jump	2.25	=15	Did not advance	

Women
Track & road events

Athlete	Event	Heat		Semifinal		Final	
Athlete	Event	Result	Rank	Result	Rank	Result	Rank
Souad Ait Salem	5000 m	16:02.10	16	—		Did not advance	
Souad Ait Salem	10000 m	—				DNF	
Nasria Azaidj	Marathon	—				DNF	
Nouria Merah Benida	1500 m	DNS		Did not advance			
Nahida Touhami	1500 m	4:06.41	8 q	4:07.21	8	Did not advance	

Field events

Athlete	Event	Qualification		Final	
Athlete	Event	Distance	Position	Distance	Position
Baya Rahouli	Triple jump	14.89	2 Q	14.86	6

== Boxing ==
Athlete	Event	Round of 32	Round of 16	Quarterfinals	Semifinals	Final	
Athlete	Event	Opposition Result	Opposition Result	Opposition Result	Opposition Result	Opposition Result	Rank
Mebarek Soltani	Flyweight	Balakshin (RUS); L 15–26	Did not advance				
Malik Bouziane	Bantamweight	Hallab (FRA); W 19–16	Kovalev (RUS); L 20–23	Did not advance			
Hadj Belkheir	Featherweight	Tichtchenko (RUS); L 17–37	Did not advance				
Nasserredine Fillali	Light welterweight	Georgiev (BUL); L RSC	Did not advance				
Benamar Meskine	Welterweight	Martirosyan (USA); L 20–45	Did not advance				
Kassel Nabil	Middleweight	Abreu (BRA); W 41–36	Dirrell (USA); L RSC	Did not advance			
Abdelhani Kensi	Light heavyweight	Song H-S (KOR); W 25–19	Haydarov (UZB); L 19–31	Did not advance			

== Fencing ==
Algeria fielded 8 fencers. All three of the male sabre fencers were defeated in the round of 64, as was the female épéeist. Sofiane el Azizi won his first match in foil, advancing to the round of 32.

Men

Athlete	Event	Round of 64	Round of 32	Round of 16	Quarterfinal	Semifinal	Final / BM	
Athlete	Event	Opposition Score	Opposition Score	Opposition Score	Opposition Score	Opposition Score	Opposition Score	Rank
Abderrahmane Daidj	Individual épée	Karyuchenko (UKR); L 6–15	Did not advance					
Sofiane El Azizi	Individual foil	Dupree (USA); W 16–15	Guyart (FRA); L 3–15	Did not advance				
Nassim Islam Bernaoui	Individual sabre	Huang Yj (CHN); L 6–15	Did not advance					
Raouf Salim Bernaoui	Individual sabre	Manetas (GRE); L 10–15	Did not advance					
Reda Benchehima	Individual sabre	Chen F (CHN); L 3–15	Did not advance					
Raouf Salim Bernaoui; Nassim Islam Bernaoui; Reda Benchehima	Team sabre	—		Greece; L 25–45	Did not advance			

Women

Athlete	Event	Round of 64	Round of 32	Round of 16	Quarterfinal	Semifinal	Final / BM	
Athlete	Event	Opposition Score	Opposition Score	Opposition Score	Opposition Score	Opposition Score	Opposition Score	Rank
Zahra Gamir	Individual épée	Brânză (ROM); L 14–15	Did not advance					
Wassila Saïd-Guerni	Individual foil	—	Meng J (CHN); L 12–15	Did not advance				

== Judo ==
Men

Athlete	Event	Round of 32	Round of 16	Quarterfinals	Semifinals	Repechage 1	Repechage 2	Repechage 3	Final / BM	
Athlete	Event	Opposition Result	Opposition Result	Opposition Result	Opposition Result	Opposition Result	Opposition Result	Opposition Result	Opposition Result	Rank
Omar Rebahi	−60 kg	Donbay (KAZ); L 0000–0001	Did not advance							
Amar Meridja	−66 kg	El Hady (EGY); W 1000–0001	Vaks (ISR); W 0010–0000	Krnáč (SLO); L 0000–1001	Did not advance	Bye	Peñas (ESP); L 0001–0020	Did not advance		
Noureddine Yagoubi	−73 kg	Latu (TGA); W 1111–0000	Bilodid (UKR); L 0000–1000	Did not advance						
Amar Benikhlef	−81 kg	El Sayed (EGY); W 1020–0000	Wanner (GER); L 0000–1002	Did not advance						
Khaled Meddah	−90 kg	Honorato (BRA); L 0000–1000	Did not advance							
Sami Belgroun	−100 kg	Ayala (PUR); W 1010–0000	Jikurauli (GEO); L 0001–1010	Did not advance						
Mohamed Bouaichaoui	+100 kg	Pertelson (EST); L 0010–1010	Did not advance							

Women

Athlete	Event	Round of 32	Round of 16	Quarterfinals	Semifinals	Repechage 1	Repechage 2	Repechage 3	Final / BM	
Athlete	Event	Opposition Result	Opposition Result	Opposition Result	Opposition Result	Opposition Result	Opposition Result	Opposition Result	Opposition Result	Rank
Soraya Haddad	−48 kg	Ali (CAF); W 1110–0000	Zambrano (CUB); W 1000–0000	Tani (JPN); L 0001–1101	Did not advance	Bye	Karagiannopoulou (GRE); L 0100-0101	Did not advance		
Salima Souakri	−52 kg	Nareks (SLO); W 0010–0001	Xian Dm (CHN); L 0000–0001	Did not advance		Bye	Imbriani (GER); W 0110–0001	Aluaş (ROM); W 0120–0100	Savón (CUB); L 0000–1000	5
Lila Latrous	−57 kg	Liu Yx (CHN); L 0011–1100	Did not advance							
Rachida Ouerdane	−70 kg	Qin Dy (CHN); L 0010–0110	Did not advance							

== Rowing ==
Men

Athlete	Event	Heats		Repechage		Semifinals		Final	
Athlete	Event	Time	Rank	Time	Rank	Time	Rank	Time	Rank
Mohammed Aich	Single sculls	7:41.85	4 R	7:46.98	4 SD/E	7:22.05	5 FE	7:25.49	28

Qualification Legend: FA=Final A (medal); FB=Final B (non-medal); FC=Final C (non-medal); FD=Final D (non-medal); FE=Final E (non-medal); FF=Final F (non-medal); SA/B=Semifinals A/B; SC/D=Semifinals C/D; SE/F=Semifinals E/F; R=Repechage

== Swimming ==
Men

Athlete	Event	Heat		Semifinal		Final	
Athlete	Event	Time	Rank	Time	Rank	Time	Rank
Raouf Benabid	200 m individual medley	2:06.34	35	Did not advance			
Sofiane Daid	100 m breaststroke	1:03.63	32	Did not advance			
Sofiane Daid	200 m breaststroke	2:17.78	31	Did not advance			
Salim Iles	50 m freestyle	22.26	4 Q	22.16 NR	4 Q	22.37	8
Salim Iles	100 m freestyle	49.72	16 Q	49.13	5 Q	49.30	7
Mahrez Mebarek	200 m freestyle	1:53.00	36	Did not advance			
Mahrez Mebarek	400 m freestyle	3:59.10	30	Did not advance			
Aghiles Slimani	100 m butterfly	56.22	48	Did not advance			
Aghiles Slimani	200 m butterfly	2:04.93	32	Did not advance			

Women

Athlete	Event	Heat		Final	
Athlete	Event	Time	Rank	Time	Rank
Sabria Dahane	400 m individual medley	5:10.20	24	Did not advance	

== Table tennis ==
Athlete	Event	Round 1	Round 2	Round 3	Round 4	Quarterfinals	Semifinals	Final / BM	
Athlete	Event	Opposition Result	Opposition Result	Opposition Result	Opposition Result	Opposition Result	Opposition Result	Opposition Result	Rank
Mohamed Boudjadja	Men's singles	Kamal (IND); L 1–4	Did not advance						
Mohamed Boudjadja; Abdel Hakim Djaziri	Men's doubles	—	Arai / Yuzawa (JPN); L 0–4	Did not advance					
Leila Boucetta	Women's singles	Huang I-H (TPE); L 0–4	Did not advance						
Asma Menaifi; Souad Nechab	Women's doubles	Ben Kahia / Guenni (TUN); L 2–4	Did not advance						

== Tennis ==
Athlete	Event	Round of 64	Round of 32	Round of 16	Quarterfinals	Semifinals	Final / BM	
Athlete	Event	Opposition Score	Opposition Score	Opposition Score	Opposition Score	Opposition Score	Opposition Score	Rank
Lamine Ouahab	Men's singles	Robredo (ESP); L 3–6, 4–6	Did not advance					

== Weightlifting ==
Algeria was represented by two weightlifters in Athens. Nafaa Benami, competing in the men's 56 kg class, did not complete the clean and jerk portion of the event.

Athlete	Event	Snatch		Clean & jerk		Total	Rank
Athlete	Event	Result	Rank	Result	Rank	Total	Rank
Nafaa Benami	Men's −56 kg	105	12	~~130~~	DNF	105	DNF
Leila Lassouani	Women's −63 kg	85	8	115	6	200	7

== Wrestling ==
Algeria has qualified a single wrestler.

Key:

- VT - Victory by Fall.
- PP - Decision by Points - the loser with technical points.
- PO - Decision by Points - the loser without technical points.

Men's Greco-Roman

Athlete	Event	Elimination Pool			Quarterfinal	Semifinal	Final / BM	
Athlete	Event	Opposition Result	Opposition Result	Rank	Opposition Result	Opposition Result	Opposition Result	Rank
Samir Benchenaf	−55 kg	Rivas (CUB); L 0–4 ^{ST}	Rangraz (IRI); L 0–4 ^{ST}	3	Did not advance			20

== See also ==
- Algeria at the 2005 Mediterranean Games
