= Table tennis at the 2004 Summer Olympics – Women's doubles =

Table tennis at the Olympics

Table tennis – Women's doubles at the Games of the XXVIII Olympiad
- Venue: Galatsi Olympic Hall
- Date: 14 to 20 August 2004
- Competitors: 68 from 26 nations

Medalists
1st place, gold medalist(s)		Wang Nan; Zhang Yining	China
2nd place, silver medalist(s)		Lee Eun-Sil; Seok Eun-Mi	South Korea
3rd place, bronze medalist(s)		Guo Yue; Niu Jianfeng	China

These are the results of the women's doubles competition, one of two events for female competitors in table tennis at the 2004 Summer Olympics in Athens.

== Qualifying athletes ==
Athletes	Country
Asma Menaifi and Souad Nechab	Algeria
Berta Rodriguez and Maria Paulina Vega	Venezuela
Nesrine Ben Kahia and Olfa Guenni	Tunisia
Offiong Edem and Cecilia Offiong	Nigeria
Maria Mirou and Archontoula Volakaki	Greece
Bose Kaffo and Olufunke Oshonaike	Nigeria
Whitney Ping and Jasna Reed	United States
Lay Jian Fang and Miao Miao	Australia
Mariany Nonaka and Ligia Silva Santos	Brazil
Luisana Perez and Fabiola Ramos	Venezuela
Tatyana Logatzkaya and Veronika Pavlovich	Belarus
Oksana Fadeyeva and Galina Melnik	Russia
Petra Cada and Mari-Christine Roussy	Canada
Tatyana Kostromina and Viktoria Pavlovich	Belarus
Mihaela Steff and Adiana Zamfir	Romania
Nicole Struse and Elke Wosik	Germany
Renata Strbikova and Alena Vachovcova	Czech Republic
Tawny Banh and Gao Jun	United States
Guo Yue and Niu Jianfeng	China
Huang I-Hua and Lu Yun-Feng	Chinese Taipei
AI Fujinuma and Aya Umemura	Japan
Lau Sui-fei and Lin Ling	Hong Kong
Song Ah Sim and Tie Ya Na	Hong Kong
Svetlana Ganina and Irina Palina	Russia
Wang Nana and Zhang Yining	China
Nikoleta Stefanova and Wenling Tan Monfardini	Italy
Lee Eun-Sil and Seok Eun-Mi	South Korea
Tan Paey Fern and Zhang Zueling	Singapore
Kim Hyang-Mi and Kim Hyon Hul	North Korea
Chunli Li and Karen Li	New Zealand
Csilia Bátorfi and Krisztina Tóth	Hungary
Tama Boroš and Cornelia Vaida	Croatia
Jing Junhong and Li Jiawei	Singapore
Kim Bok Rae and Kim Kyung-Ah	South Korea

== Seeds ==
1. Guo Yue / Niu Jianfeng (CHN) (semifinals, bronze medalist)
2. Wang Nan / Zhang Yining (CHN) (champion, gold medalist)
3. Lee Eun-sil / Seok Eun-mi (KOR) (final, silver medalist)
4. Jing Junhong / Li Jiawei (SIN) (fourth round)
5. Song Ah Sim / Tie Ya Na (HKG) (quarterfinals)
6. Csilla Bátorfi / Krisztina Tóth (HUN) (fourth round)
7. Ai Fujinuma / Aya Umemura (JPN) (quarterfinals)
8. Kim Hyang-mi / Kim Hyon-hui (PRK) (quarterfinals)

== Final rounds ==
Quarterfinals
1	Guo Yue (CHN); Niu Jianfeng (CHN)	11	12	9	12	11	11
7	Ai Fujinuma (JPN); Aya Umemura (JPN)	3	10	11	14	4	8
5	Song Ah Sim (HKG); Tie Ya Na (HKG)	4	11	13	8	10	8
2	Wang Nan (CHN); Zhang Yining (CHN)	11	3	11	11	12	11
3	Lee Eun-sil (KOR); Seok Eun-mi (KOR)	12	4	11	11	9	11
8	Kim Hyang-mi (PRK); Kim Hyon-hui (PRK)	10	11	9	8	11	7
Tamara Boroš (CRO); Cornelia Vaida (CRO)	4	5	3	8
Kim Bok-rae (KOR); Kim Kyung-ah (KOR)	11	11	11	11

Semifinals
1	Guo Yue (CHN); Niu Jianfeng (CHN)	7	11	11	11	11	11
2	Wang Nan (CHN); Zhang Yining (CHN)	11	13	9	13	6	13
3	Lee Eun-sil (KOR); Seok Eun-mi (KOR)	11	12	11	11
Kim Bok-rae (KOR); Kim Kyung-ah (KOR)	6	10	7	2

Gold medal match
2	Wang Nan (CHN); Zhang Yining (CHN)	11	11	11	11
3	Lee Eun-sil (KOR); Seok Eun-mi (KOR)	9	7	6	6
Bronze medal match
1	Guo Yue (CHN); Niu Jianfeng (CHN)	11	5	11	11	7	9	11
Kim Bok-rae (KOR); Kim Kyung-ah (KOR)	7	11	4	9	11	11	9

== Preliminary rounds ==
First round
Nesrine Ben Kahia (TUN); Olfa Guenni (TUN)	11	11	11	9	8	11
Asma Menaifi (ALG); Souad Nechab (ALG)	9	7	5	11	11	8
Berta Rodriguez (CHI); María Paulina Vega (CHI)	14	8	11	7	13	5	7
Luisana Pérez (VEN); Fabiola Ramos (VEN)	12	11	6	11	11	11	11

Second round
Huang I-hua (TPE); Lu Yun-Feng (TPE)	11	11	11	11
Nesrine Ben Kahia (TUN); Olfa Guenni (TUN)	4	4	6	4
Oksana Fadeyeva (RUS); Galina Melnik (RUS)	7	11	11	11	6	10	11
Offiong Edem (NGR); Cecilia Offiong (NGR)	11	3	9	2	11	12	6
Petra Cada (CAN); Marie-Christine Roussy (CAN)	11	4	11	11	11
Maria Mirou (GRE); Archontoula Volakaki (GRE)	8	11	7	9	8
Bose Kaffo (NGR); Olufunke Oshonaike (NGR)	9	6	10	12	11	12	9
Nikoleta Stefanova (ITA); Wenling Tan Monfardini (ITA)	11	11	12	10	5	10	11
Tan Paey Fern (SIN); Zhang Xueling (SIN)	11	11	11	13
Whitney Ping (USA); Jasna Reed (USA)	8	4	5	11
Chunli Li (NZL); Karen Li (NZL)	12	8	6	11	11	14
Lay Jian Fang (AUS); Miao Miao (AUS)	10	11	11	5	2	12
Mariany Nonaka (BRA); Ligia Silva Santos (BRA)	2	4	11	11	9	9
Renata Strbikova (CZE); Alena Vachovcová (CZE)	11	11	7	6	11	11
Tawny Banh (USA); Gao Jun (USA)	11	11	11	11
Luisana Perez (VEN); Fabiola Ramos (VEN)	3	4	6	6

Third round
Tatyana Logatskaya (BLR); Veronika Pavlovich (BLR)	12	12	7	11	12	9	7
Huang I-hua (TPE); Lu Yun-Feng (TPE)	10	10	11	7	14	11	11
Lau Sui-fei (HKG); Lin Ling (HKG)	11	11	11	8	11	11
Oksana Fadeyeva (RUS); Galina Melnik (RUS)	8	7	5	11	13	8
Svetlana Ganina (RUS); Irina Palina (RUS)	11	11	11	11
Petra Cada (CAN); Marie-Christine Roussy (CAN)	5	2	7	6
Tatyana Kostromina (BLR); Viktoria Pavlovich (BLR)	7	12	13	5	7	7
Nikoleta Stefanova (ITA); Wenling Tan Monfardini (ITA)	11	10	11	11	11	11
Mihaela Steff (ROU); Adriana Zamfir (ROU)	11	6	10	9	8
Tan Paey Fern (SIN); Zhang Xueling (SIN)	8	11	12	11	11
Nicole Struse (GER); Elke Wosik (GER)	6	7	7	12	6
Chunli Li (NZL); Karen Li (NZL)	11	11	11	10	11
Tamara Boroš (CRO); Cornelia Vaida (CRO)	9	11	11	11	11
Renata Strbikova (CZE); Alena Vachovcova (CZE)	11	8	8	7	3
Kim Bok Rae (KOR); Kim Kyung-Ah (KOR)	11	11	11	11
Tawny Banh (USA); Gao Jun (USA)	4	3	7	9

Fourth round
1	Guo Yue (CHN); Niu Jianfeng (CHN)	11	11	11	11
Huang I-Hua (TPE); Lu Yun-Feng (TPE)	9	4	6	2
7	Ai Fujinuma (JPN); Aya Umemura (JPN)	11	6	11	12	7	11
Lau Sui-fei (HKG); Lin Ling (HKG)	9	11	9	10	11	7
5	Song Ah Sim (HKG); Tie Ya Na (HKG)	11	11	11	11
Svetlana Ganina (RUS); Irina Palina (RUS)	7	6	7	7
2	Wang Nan (CHN); Zhang Yining (CHN)	11	11	12	14
Nikoleta Stefanova (ITA); Wenling Tan Monfardini (ITA)	6	3	10	12
3	Lee Eun-Sil (KOR); Seok Eun-Mi (KOR)	14	11	11	11
Tan Paey Fern (SIN); Zhang Xueling (SIN)	12	7	7	8
8	Kim Hyang-Mi (PRK); Kim Hyon Hui (PRK)	11	11	11	11	11	11
Chunli Li (NZL); Karen Li (NZL)	8	13	6	13	5	4
6	Csilla Bátorfi (HUN); Krisztina Tóth (HUN)	6	11	9	3	3
Tamara Boroš (CRO); Cornelia Vaida (CRO)	11	9	11	11	11
4	Jing Junhong (SIN); Li Jiawei (SIN)	11	5	10	11	11	8	8
Kim Bok Rae (KOR); Kim Kyung-Ah (KOR)	9	11	12	8	9	11	11
