= Singapore at the 2004 Summer Olympics =

- IOC code: SIN
- NOC: Singapore National Olympic Council
- Website: www.singaporeolympics.com

in Athens
- Competitors: 16 in 6 sports
- Flag bearer: Ronald Susilo
- Medals: Gold 0 Silver 0 Bronze 0 Total 0

Summer Olympics appearances (overview)
- 1948; 1952; 1956; 1960; 1964; 1968; 1972; 1976; 1980; 1984; 1988; 1992; 1996; 2000; 2004; 2008; 2012; 2016; 2020; 2024; 2028

Singapore competed at the 2004 Summer Olympics in Athens, Greece, from 13 to 29 August 2004. This was the nation's thirteenth appearance at the Olympics, except for two different editions. Singapore was part of the Malaysian team at the 1964 Summer Olympics in Tokyo, but did not attend at the 1980 Summer Olympics in Moscow, because of its support for the United States boycott.

The Singapore National Olympic Council sent a total of sixteen athletes to the Games, six men and ten women, to compete in six different sports. The nation's team size was roughly denser from Sydney by two athletes, being considered its largest delegation since the 1956 Summer Olympics in Melbourne. For the first time in its Olympic history, Singapore was represented by more female than male athletes. Eight Singaporean athletes had previously competed in Sydney four years earlier; five of which were swimmers, including four-time Olympian and multiple-time Southeast Asian Games champion Joscelin Yeo. Meanwhile, badminton player Ronald Susilo was appointed by the council to carry the Singaporean flag in the opening ceremony.

Singapore, however, failed to win a single Olympic medal in Athens since the 1960 Summer Olympics in Rome, where Tan Howe Liang claimed silver in men's weightlifting. Table tennis player Li Jiawei narrowly missed the nation's first ever medal in 44 years, after losing out her match against South Korea's Kim Kyung-Ah for the bronze.

== Athletics ==
Singaporean athletes have so far achieved qualifying standards in the following athletics events (up to a maximum of 3 athletes in each event at the 'A' Standard, and 1 at the 'B' Standard).

Men
Track & road events

| Athlete | Event | Heat | | Quarter-final | | Semi-final | | Final | |
| Athlete | Event | Result | Rank | Result | Rank | Result | Rank | Result | Rank |
|---|---|---|---|---|---|---|---|---|---|
| Poh Seng Song | 100 m | 10.75 | 7 | Did not advance | | | | | |

Women
Field events

| Athlete | Event | Qualification | | Final | |
| Athlete | Event | Distance | Position | Distance | Position |
|---|---|---|---|---|---|
| Zhang Guirong | Shot put | 16.58 | 24 | Did not advance | |

Key

- Note–Ranks given for track events are within the athlete's heat only
- Q = Qualified for the next round
- q = Qualified for the next round as a fastest loser or, in field events, by position without achieving the qualifying target
- NR = National record
- N/A = Round not applicable for the event
- Bye = Athlete not required to compete in round

== Badminton ==
| Athlete | Event | Round of 32 | Round of 16 | Quarterfinal | Semi-final | Final / BM | |
| Athlete | Event | Opposition Score | Opposition Score | Opposition Score | Opposition Score | Opposition Score | Rank |
|---|---|---|---|---|---|---|---|
| Ronald Susilo | Men's singles | Lin D (CHN); W 15–12, 15–10 | Joppien (GER); W 15–11, 15–6 | Ponsana (THA); L 10–15, 1–15 | Did not advance | | |
| Jiang Yanmei | Women's singles | Jie Y (NED); L 9–11, 4–11 | Did not advance | | | | |
| Li Li | Women's singles | Gong Rn (CHN); L 9–11, 4–11 | Did not advance | | | | |

== Sailing ==
Singaporean sailors have qualified one boat for each of the following events.

Open

| Athlete | Event | Race | | | | | | | | | | | Net points | Final rank |
| Athlete | Event | 1 | 2 | 3 | 4 | 5 | 6 | 7 | 8 | 9 | 10 | M* | Net points | Final rank |
|---|---|---|---|---|---|---|---|---|---|---|---|---|---|---|
| Stanley Tan Kheng Siong | Laser | 32 | 27 | 25 | 30 | 34 | 40 | 41 | 39 | 36 | ~~DSQ~~ | 18 | 322 | 37 |

M = Medal race; OCS = On course side of the starting line; DSQ = Disqualified; DNF = Did not finish; DNS= Did not start; RDG = Redress given

== Shooting ==
Singapore has qualified a single shooter.

Men

| Athlete | Event | Qualification | | Final | |
| Athlete | Event | Points | Rank | Points | Rank |
|---|---|---|---|---|---|
| Lee Wung Yew | Trap | 115 | =21 | Did not advance | |

== Swimming ==
Singaporean swimmers earned qualifying standards in the following events (up to a maximum of 2 swimmers in each event at the A-standard time, and 1 at the B-standard time):

Men

| Athlete | Event | Heat | | Semi-final | | Final | |
| Athlete | Event | Time | Rank | Time | Rank | Time | Rank |
|---|---|---|---|---|---|---|---|
| Mark Chay | 100 m freestyle | 52.83 | 56 | Did not advance | | | |
| Mark Chay | 200 m freestyle | 1:54.70 | 51 | Did not advance | | | |
| Gary Tan | 200 m individual medley | 2:08.44 | 43 | Did not advance | | | |

Women

| Athlete | Event | Heat | | Semi-final | | Final | |
| Athlete | Event | Time | Rank | Time | Rank | Time | Rank |
|---|---|---|---|---|---|---|---|
| Christel Bouvron | 200 m butterfly | 2:26.21 | 32 | Did not advance | | | |
| Nicolette Teo | 100 m breaststroke | 1:12.87 | 33 | Did not advance | | | |
| Nicolette Teo | 200 m breaststroke | 2:38.17 | 30 | Did not advance | | | |
| Joscelin Yeo | 100 m butterfly | 1:00.81 | 27 | Did not advance | | | |
| Joscelin Yeo | 200 m individual medley | 2:18.61 | 19 | Did not advance | | | |

== Table tennis ==
Four Singaporean table tennis players qualified for the following events.

| Athlete | Event | Round 1 | Round 2 | Round 3 | Round 4 | Quarterfinals | Semi-finals | Final / BM | |
| Athlete | Event | Opposition Result | Opposition Result | Opposition Result | Opposition Result | Opposition Result | Opposition Result | Opposition Result | Rank |
|---|---|---|---|---|---|---|---|---|---|
| Jing Junhong | Women's singles | Bye | Erdelji (SCG); W 4–2 | Kim H-H (PRK); L 1–4 | Did not advance | | | | |
| Li Jiawei | Women's singles | Bye | | Cada (CAN); W 4–0 | Umemura (JPN); W 4–2 | Wang N (CHN); W 4–1 | Kim H-M (PRK); L 3–4 | Kim K-A (KOR); L 1-4 | 4 |
| Zhang Xueling | Women's singles | Bye | Fazlić (USA); W 4–1 | Lee E-S (KOR); W 4–1 | Fujinuma (JPN); W 4–2 | Kim H-M (PRK); L 2–4 | Did not advance | | |
| Jing Junhong; Li Jiawei | Women's doubles | Bye | | | Kim B-R / Kim K-A (KOR); L 3–4 | Did not advance | | | |
| Tan Paey Fern; Zhang Xueling | Women's doubles | Bye | Fazlić / Ping (USA); W 4–0 | Steff / Zamfir (ROM); W 4–1 | Lee E-S / Seok E-M (KOR); L 0–4 | Did not advance | | | |

== See also ==
- Singapore at the 2002 Asian Games
- Singapore at the 2004 Summer Paralympics
