= Tunisia at the 2004 Summer Olympics =

- IOC code: TUN
- NOC: Tunisian Olympic Committee
- Website: www.cnot.org.tn (in French)

in Athens
- Competitors: 54 in 14 sports
- Flag bearer: Noureddine Hfaiedh
- Medals: Gold 0 Silver 0 Bronze 0 Total 0

Summer Olympics appearances (overview)
- 1960; 1964; 1968; 1972; 1976; 1980; 1984; 1988; 1992; 1996; 2000; 2004; 2008; 2012; 2016; 2020; 2024

Tunisia competed at the 2004 Summer Olympics in Athens, Greece, from 13 to 29 August 2004. This was the nation's eleventh appearance at the Olympics, except the 1980 Summer Olympics in Moscow because of its partial support to the United States boycott.

The Tunisian Olympic Committee (French: Comité National Olympique Tunisien, CNOT) sent the nation's largest delegation to the Games, surpassing the record by three athletes short in Atlanta eight years earlier. A total of 54 athletes, 44 men and 10 women, competed only in 14 sports. men's football, and men's indoor volleyball were the only team-based sports in which Tunisia had its representation at these Olympic Games. Among the sports played by the athletes, Tunisia marked its Olympic debut in artistic gymnastics and taekwondo. Five Tunisian athletes had previously competed in Sydney, including race walker Hatem Ghoula, and swimmer Oussama Mellouli, who won the bronze at the 2003 FINA World Championships in Barcelona, Spain. Meanwhile, volleyball team captain Noureddine Hfaiedh was the nation's flag bearer in the opening ceremony.

== Athletics ==
Tunisian athletes have so far achieved qualifying standards in the following athletics events (up to a maximum of 3 athletes in each event at the 'A' Standard, and 1 at the 'B' Standard).

Key

- Note–Ranks given for track events are within the athlete's heat only
- Q = Qualified for the next round
- q = Qualified for the next round as a fastest loser or, in field events, by position without achieving the qualifying target
- NR = National record
- N/A = Round not applicable for the event
- Bye = Athlete not required to compete in round

Men
Track & road events

Athlete	Event	Heat		Semifinal		Final	
Athlete	Event	Result	Rank	Result	Rank	Result	Rank
Hatem Ghoula	20 km walk	—				1:22:59	11
Sofiane Labidi	400 m	46.04	3	Did not advance			
Lotfi Turki	3000 m steeplechase	DNS		—		Did not advance	

Women
Field events

Athlete	Event	Qualification		Final	
Athlete	Event	Distance	Position	Distance	Position
Aida Sellam	Javelin throw	57.76	24	Did not advance	

== Boxing ==
Tunisia sent five boxers to Athens.

Athlete	Event	Round of 32	Round of 16	Quarterfinals	Semifinals	Final	
Athlete	Event	Opposition Result	Opposition Result	Opposition Result	Opposition Result	Opposition Result	Rank
Walid Cherif	Flyweight	Izoria (GEO); L 14–24	Did not advance				
Saifeddine Nejmaoui	Featherweight	Djelkhir (FRA); L 13–38	Did not advance				
Taoufik Chobba	Lightweight	Little (AUS); L 8–27	Did not advance				
Mohamed Ali Sassi	Light welterweight	Blain (FRA); L 14–36	Did not advance				
Mohamed Sahraoui	Middleweight	Balzsay (HUN); L 24–29	Did not advance				

== Fencing ==
Two Tunisian fencers qualified for the following events:

Men

Athlete	Event	Round of 64	Round of 32	Round of 16	Quarterfinal	Semifinal	Final / BM	
Athlete	Event	Opposition Score	Opposition Score	Opposition Score	Opposition Score	Opposition Score	Opposition Score	Rank
Maher Ben Aziza	Individual foil	Tiomkin (USA); L 10–15	Did not advance					
Mohamed Rebai	Individual sabre	Agresta (BRA); L 14–15	Did not advance					

== Football ==
=== Men's tournament ===
The Tunisia national football team qualified for the Olympics after winning a very tight group with three other African football powers, Nigeria, Senegal and Egypt.

Roster

The following is the Tunisian squad in the men's football tournament of the 2004 Summer Olympics.

Head coach: Khemais Labidi

No.	Pos.	Player	Date of birth (age)	Caps	Goals	2004 club
1	GK	Khaled Fadhel*	29 September 1976 (aged 27)	0	0	(Tunisia) CS Sfaxien
2	DF	Anis Boussaidi	10 April 1981 (aged 23)	0	0	(Tunisia) Stade Tunisien
3	DF	Karim Haggui	20 January 1984 (aged 20)	0	0	(France) Strasbourg
4	DF	Alaeddine Yahia	26 September 1981 (aged 22)	0	0	(France) Guingamp
5	FW	Sabeur Trabelsi	18 February 1984 (aged 20)	0	0	(Tunisia) Étoile Sahel
6	MF	Houcine Ragued	11 February 1983 (aged 21)	0	0	(France) Paris Saint-Germain
7	DF	Amir Hadj Massaoued	8 February 1981 (aged 23)	0	0	(Tunisia) CS Sfaxien
8	DF	Zied Bhairi	5 February 1981 (aged 23)	0	0	(Tunisia) Espérance
9	FW	Ali Zitouni	11 January 1981 (aged 23)	0	0	(Tunisia) Espérance
10	MF	Khaled Mouelhi	13 February 1981 (aged 23)	0	0	(Tunisia) Club Africain
11	FW	Amine Ltaief	4 July 1984 (aged 20)	0	0	(France) Créteil
12	DF	Anis Ayari	16 February 1982 (aged 22)	0	0	(Tunisia) Stade Tunisien
13	MF	Ouissen Ben Yahia	9 September 1984 (aged 19)	0	0	(Tunisia) Club Africain
14	MF	Mejdi Traoui	13 December 1983 (aged 20)	0	0	(Tunisia) Étoile Sahel
15	DF	Jose Clayton*	21 March 1974 (aged 30)	0	0	(Tunisia) Espérance
16	DF	Issam Merdassi	16 March 1981 (aged 23)	0	0	(Tunisia) CS Sfaxien
17	FW	Mohamed Jedidi*	10 September 1978 (aged 25)	0	0	(Tunisia) Étoile Sahel
18	GK	Jassem Khaloufi	2 September 1981 (aged 22)	0	0	(Tunisia) AS Marsa

* Over-aged player.

Group play

Pos	Team	Pld	W	D	L	GF	GA	GD	Pts	Qualification
1	Argentina	3	3	0	0	9	0	+9	9	Qualified for the quarterfinals
2	Australia	3	1	1	1	6	3	+3	4	Qualified for the quarterfinals
3	Tunisia	3	1	1	1	4	5	−1	4	
4	Serbia and Montenegro	3	0	0	3	3	14	−11	0	

11 August 2004
20:30

Tunisia	1 – 1	Australia
Zitouni 69'	Report	Aloisi 45'

Pankritio Stadium, Heraklion
Attendance: 15,757
Referee: Kyros Vassaras (Greece)

14 August 2004
20:30

Argentina	2 – 0	Tunisia
Tevez 39'; Saviola 72'	Report

Pampeloponnisiako Stadium, Patras
Attendance: 5,512
Referee: Éric Poulat (France)

17 August 2004
20:30

Serbia and Montenegro	2 – 3	Tunisia
Krasić 70'; Vukčević 87'	Report	Clayton 41'; Jedidi 83' (pen.); Zitouni 89'

Pampeloponnisiako Stadium, Patras
Attendance: 5,512
Referee: Charles Ariiotima (Tahiti)

== Gymnastics ==
=== Artistic ===
Men

Athlete	Event	Qualification								Final							
Athlete	Event	Apparatus						Total	Rank	Apparatus						Total	Rank
Athlete	Event	F	PH	R	V	PB	HB	Total	Rank	F	PH	R	V	PB	HB	Total	Rank
Wajdi Bouallègue	All-around	9.112	8.950	8.562	9.025	8.350	8.512	52.511	47	Did not advance							

== Judo ==
Four Tunisian judoka (one male and three females) qualified for the 2004 Summer Olympics.

Men

Athlete	Event	Round of 32	Round of 16	Quarterfinals	Semifinals	Repechage 1	Repechage 2	Repechage 3	Final / BM	
Athlete	Event	Opposition Result	Opposition Result	Opposition Result	Opposition Result	Opposition Result	Opposition Result	Opposition Result	Opposition Result	Rank
Anis Lounifi	−60 kg	Pak N-C (PRK); W 1000–0001	Stanev (RUS); L 0000–1001	Did not advance						

Women

Athlete	Event	Round of 32	Round of 16	Quarterfinals	Semifinals	Repechage 1	Repechage 2	Repechage 3	Final / BM	
Athlete	Event	Opposition Result	Opposition Result	Opposition Result	Opposition Result	Opposition Result	Opposition Result	Opposition Result	Opposition Result	Rank
Saida Dhahri	−63 kg	Tanimoto (JPN); L 0000–1000	Did not advance			Maza (ECU); W 1010–0000	Chisholm (CAN); L 0000–1000	Did not advance		
Houda Ben Daya	−78 kg	Bye	Silva (BRA); L 0001–1020	Did not advance						
Insaf Yahyaoui	+78 kg	Bye	Sun Fm (CHN); L 0000–1010	Did not advance		Bye	Chalá (ECU); W 0120–0000	Blanco (VEN); W 1012–0000	Donguzashvili (RUS); L 0000–0210	5

== Rowing ==
Tunisian rowers qualified the following boats:

Men

Athlete	Event	Heats		Repechage		Semifinals		Final	
Athlete	Event	Time	Rank	Time	Rank	Time	Rank	Time	Rank
Ibtissem Trimech	Single sculls	8:15.87	6 R	7:56.19	4 SD/E	8:14.73	6 FD	7:51.21	19

Qualification Legend: FA=Final A (medal); FB=Final B (non-medal); FC=Final C (non-medal); FD=Final D (non-medal); FE=Final E (non-medal); FF=Final F (non-medal); SA/B=Semifinals A/B; SC/D=Semifinals C/D; SE/F=Semifinals E/F; R=Repechage

== Sailing ==
Tunisian sailors have qualified one boat for each of the following events.

Men

Athlete	Event	Race											Net points	Final rank
Athlete	Event	1	2	3	4	5	6	7	8	9	10	M*	Net points	Final rank
Foued Ourabi	Mistral	23	~~31~~	27	21	21	19	25	19	25	15	16	211	23

M = Medal race; OCS = On course side of the starting line; DSQ = Disqualified; DNF = Did not finish; DNS= Did not start; RDG = Redress given

== Swimming ==
Tunisian swimmers earned qualifying standards in the following events (up to a maximum of 2 swimmers in each event at the A-standard time, and 1 at the B-standard time):

Men

Athlete	Event	Heat		Semifinal		Final	
Athlete	Event	Time	Rank	Time	Rank	Time	Rank
Anouar Ben Naceur	200 m freestyle	1:54.69	50	Did not advance			
Oussama Mellouli	1500 m freestyle	15:18.98	14	—		Did not advance	
Oussama Mellouli	200 m individual medley	2:01.94 AF	15 Q	2:01.11 AF	9	Did not advance	
Oussama Mellouli	400 m individual medley	4:16.68	=6 Q	—		4:14.49 AF	5

== Table tennis ==
Two Tunisian table tennis players qualified for the following events.

Athlete	Event	Round 1	Round 2	Round 3	Round 4	Quarterfinals	Semifinals	Final / BM	
Athlete	Event	Opposition Result	Opposition Result	Opposition Result	Opposition Result	Opposition Result	Opposition Result	Opposition Result	Rank
Nesrine Ben Kahia	Women's singles	Erdelji (SCG); L 0–4	Did not advance						
Olfa Guenni	Women's singles	Cada (CAN); L 0–4	Did not advance						
Nesrine Ben Kahia; Olfa Guenni	Women's doubles	Menaifi / Nechab (ALG); W 4–2	Huang I-H / Lu Y-F (TPE); L 0–4	Did not advance					

== Taekwondo ==
Three Tunisian taekwondo jin qualified for the following events.

Athlete	Event	Round of 16	Quarterfinals	Semifinals	Repechage 1	Repechage 2	Final / BM	
Athlete	Event	Opposition Result	Opposition Result	Opposition Result	Opposition Result	Opposition Result	Opposition Result	Rank
Mohamed Omrani	Men's −68 kg	Massimino (AUS); L 2–7	Did not advance					
Hichem Hamdouni	Men's −80 kg	Obiorah (NGR); W 16–11	Tanrıkulu (TUR); L 2–7	Did not advance	Geisler (PHI); W RSC	Karami (IRI); L 4-12	Did not advance	5
Mounira Nahdi	Women's −67 kg	Benabderassoul (MAR); L 2–6	Did not advance					

== Volleyball ==
Tunisia has qualified a men's team for the indoor tournament after earning a spot from the African Championships.

=== Men's tournament ===
Roster

The following is the Tunisian roster in the men's volleyball tournament of the 2004 Summer Olympics.

Head coach: Antonio Giacobbe

№	Name	Date of birth	Height	Weight	Spike	Block	2004 club
2	Mohamed Trabelsi	15 September 1981	2.02 m (6 ft 8 in)	92 kg (203 lb)	340 cm (130 in)	320 cm (130 in)	(Tunisia) CS Sfaxien
3	Mehdi Gara	1 March 1981	1.89 m (6 ft 2 in)	78 kg (172 lb)	332 cm (131 in)	317 cm (125 in)	(Tunisia) C.O. Kelibia
4	Walid Ben Abbes	19 June 1980	1.86 m (6 ft 1 in)	76 kg (168 lb)	331 cm (130 in)	308 cm (121 in)	Unattached
5	Samir Sellami	13 July 1977	1.94 m (6 ft 4 in)	82 kg (181 lb)	320 cm (130 in)	308 cm (121 in)	(Tunisia) CS Sfaxien
7	Chaker Ghezal	14 January 1977	1.99 m (6 ft 6 in)	90 kg (200 lb)	352 cm (139 in)	335 cm (132 in)	(Tunisia) E.S. Sahel
9	Khaled Belaïd	30 December 1973	1.95 m (6 ft 5 in)	82 kg (181 lb)	326 cm (128 in)	312 cm (123 in)	(Tunisia) CS Sfaxien
11	Marouane Fehri	1 July 1979	1.97 m (6 ft 6 in)	79 kg (174 lb)	325 cm (128 in)	306 cm (120 in)	(Tunisia) C.O. Kelibia
13	Noureddine Hfaiedh	27 August 1973	1.97 m (6 ft 6 in)	86 kg (190 lb)	350 cm (140 in)	315 cm (124 in)	(Tunisia) E.S. Sahel
14	Mehrez Berriri (L)	13 April 1975	1.86 m (6 ft 1 in)	80 kg (180 lb)	328 cm (129 in)	305 cm (120 in)	(Tunisia) CS Sfaxien
15	Ghazi Guidara (C)	18 May 1974	1.86 m (6 ft 1 in)	75 kg (165 lb)	326 cm (128 in)	305 cm (120 in)	(Tunisia) E.S. Tunis
17	Mohammed Slim Chekili	15 March 1985	1.98 m (6 ft 6 in)	82 kg (181 lb)	328 cm (129 in)	309 cm (122 in)	(Tunisia) C.O. Kelibia
18	Hosni Karamosly	1 June 1980	1.97 m (6 ft 6 in)	82 kg (181 lb)	338 cm (133 in)	315 cm (124 in)	(Tunisia) CS Sfaxien

Group play

Pos	Team	Pld	W	L	Pts	SW	SL	SR	SPW	SPL	SPR	Qualification
1	Serbia and Montenegro	5	4	1	9	12	6	2.000	427	398	1.073	Quarterfinals
2	Greece	5	3	2	8	12	9	1.333	475	454	1.046	Quarterfinals
3	Argentina	5	3	2	8	12	9	1.333	471	457	1.031	Quarterfinals
4	Poland	5	3	2	8	10	9	1.111	422	419	1.007	Quarterfinals
5	France	5	2	3	7	8	10	0.800	405	394	1.028	
6	Tunisia	5	0	5	5	4	15	0.267	373	451	0.827	

Source: FIVB

15 August 2004; 19:30	Tunisia	0–3	Greece	Peace and Friendship Stadium; Attendance: 8,200; Referees: Valdir Dellaqua (BRA), Fernando Nava (MEX)
15 August 2004; 19:30	(20–25, 14–25, 17–25) result			Peace and Friendship Stadium; Attendance: 8,200; Referees: Valdir Dellaqua (BRA), Fernando Nava (MEX)

17 August 2004; 09:00	Tunisia	2–3	Argentina	Peace and Friendship Stadium; Attendance: 888; Referees: Ibrahim Al-Naama (QAT), Ryszard Dietrich (POL)
17 August 2004; 09:00	(20–25, 25–23, 16–25, 25–22, 10–15) result			Peace and Friendship Stadium; Attendance: 888; Referees: Ibrahim Al-Naama (QAT), Ryszard Dietrich (POL)

19 August 2004; 16:00	Serbia and Montenegro	3–0	Tunisia	Peace and Friendship Stadium; Attendance: 3,430; Referees: Abdullah Al-Khelaifi (KSA), Valdir Dellaqua (BRA)
19 August 2004; 16:00	(25–16, 25–18, 25–21) result			Peace and Friendship Stadium; Attendance: 3,430; Referees: Abdullah Al-Khelaifi (KSA), Valdir Dellaqua (BRA)

21 August 2004; 14:00	Tunisia	1–3	Poland	Peace and Friendship Stadium; Attendance: 4,600; Referees: Patricia Salvatore (USA), Ibrahim Al-Naama (QAT)
21 August 2004; 14:00	(18–25, 25–23, 19–25, 23–25) result			Peace and Friendship Stadium; Attendance: 4,600; Referees: Patricia Salvatore (USA), Ibrahim Al-Naama (QAT)

23 August 2004; 09:00	France	3–1	Tunisia	Peace and Friendship Stadium; Attendance: 1,860; Referees: Francisco Medina (CUB), Fernando Nava (MEX)
23 August 2004; 09:00	(25–23, 18–25, 25–19, 25–19) result			Peace and Friendship Stadium; Attendance: 1,860; Referees: Francisco Medina (CUB), Fernando Nava (MEX)

== Weightlifting ==
Two Tunisian weightlifters qualified for the following events:

Athlete	Event	Snatch		Clean & Jerk		Total	Rank
Athlete	Event	Result	Rank	Result	Rank	Total	Rank
Youssef Sbaî	Men's −69 kg	~~147.5~~	DNF	—	—	—	DNF
Hayet Sassi	Women's −63 kg	95	=4	120	4	215	4

== Wrestling ==
Key:
- VT - Victory by Fall.
- PP - Decision by Points - the loser with technical points.
- PO - Decision by Points - the loser without technical points.

Women's freestyle

Athlete	Event	Elimination Pool				Classification	Semifinal	Final / BM	
Athlete	Event	Opposition Result	Opposition Result	Opposition Result	Rank	Opposition Result	Opposition Result	Opposition Result	Rank
Fadhila Louati	−48 kg	Psatha (GRE); L 0–5 ^{VT}	Merleni (UKR); L 0–4 ^{ST}	Karamchakova (TJK); L 0–5 ^{VT}	4	Did not advance			14

== See also ==
- Tunisia at the 2004 Summer Paralympics
- Tunisia at the 2005 Mediterranean Games
