= Table tennis at the 2004 Summer Olympics – Women's singles =

Table tennis at the Olympics

Table tennis – Women's singles at the Games of the XXVIII Olympiad
- Venue: Galatsi Olympic Hall
- Date: 14 to 22 August 2004
- Competitors: 64 from 36 nations

Medalists
1st place, gold medalist(s)		Zhang Yining	China
2nd place, silver medalist(s)		Kim Hyang-mi	North Korea
3rd place, bronze medalist(s)		Kim Kyung-ah	South Korea

These are the results of the women's singles competition, one of two events for female competitors in table tennis at the 2004 Summer Olympics in Athens.

== Qualifying Athletes ==
Athletes	Country
Yoon Ji he	South Korea
Tawny Banh	United States
Fabiola Ramos	Venezuela
Laura Negrisoli	Italy
Nanthana Komwong	Thailand
Mouma Das	India
Marina Kravchenko	Israel
ARchontoula Volakaki	Greece
Olufunke Oshonaike	Nigeria
Berta Rodriguez	Chile
Silvija Erdelji	Serbia and Montenegro
Nesrine Ben Kahia	Tunisia
Marisol Espineira	Peru
Miao Miao	Australia
Leila Boucetta	Algeria
Huang I-hua	Chinese Taipei
Cornelia Vaida	Croatia
Lay Jian Fang	Australia
Manzura Inoyatova	Uzbekistan
Maria Fazakas	Hungary
Jasna Reed	United States
Renata Strbikova	Czech Republic
Oksana Fadeyeva	Russia
Wu Xue	Dominican Republic
Petra Cada	Canada
Olfa Guenni	Tunisia
Asma Menaifi	Algeria
Nikoleta Stefanova	Italy
Zeina Shaban	Jordan
Iizzwa Medina	Honduras
Cicilia Offiong	Nigeria
Ligia Silva Santos	Brazil
Chunli Li	New Zealand
Svetlana Ganina	Russia
Nicole Struse	Germany
Otilia Badescu	Romania
Krisztina Tóth	Hungary
Jing Junhong	Singapore
Ai Fukuhara	Japan
Wenling Tan Monfardini	Italy
Elke Wosik	Germany
Kim Hyang-Mi	North Korea
Zhang Xueling	Singapore
Ai Fujinuma	Japan
Csilia Bátorfi	Hungary
Jie Schöpp	Germany
Adriana Zamfir	Romania
Kim Yun-Mi	Puerto Rico
Zhang Yining	China
Lau Sui-fei	Hong Kong
Viktoria Pavlovich	Belarus
Tamara Boroš	Croatia
Tie Ya Na	Hong Kong
Kim Hyon-hui	Puerto Rico
Gao Jun	United States
Kim Kyung-Ah	South Korea
Niu Jianfeng	China
Mihaela Steff	Romania
Lee Eun-Sil	South Korea
Liu Jia	Austria
LI Jiawei	Singapore
Aya Umemura	Japan
Lin Ling	Hong Kong
Wang Nan	China

== Seeds ==
The top 16 seeded players qualified directly to the third round.

1. Zhang Yining (CHN) (champion, gold medalist)
2. Wang Nan (CHN) (quarterfinals)
3. Niu Jianfeng (CHN) (fourth round)
4. Kim Kyung-ah (KOR) (semifinals, bronze medalist)
5. Tamara Boroš (CRO) (quarterfinals)
6. Li Jiawei (SIN) (semifinals, fourth place)
7. Tie Ya Na (HKG) (quarterfinals)
8. Liu Jia (AUT) (third round)
9. Lin Ling (HKG) (third round)
10. Gao Jun (USA) (third round)
11. Lau Sui Fei (HKG) (fourth round)
12. Mihaela Steff (ROU) (third round)
13. Aya Umemura (JPN) (fourth round)
14. Lee Eun-sil (KOR) (third round)
15. Kim Hyon-hui (PRK) (fourth round)
16. Viktoria Pavlovich (BLR) (fourth round)

The players seeded from 17 to 32 qualified directly to the second round.

17. Krisztina Tóth (HUN) (third round)
18. Ai Fukuhara (JPN) (fourth round)
19. Nicole Struse (GER) (second round)
20. Jie Schöpp (GER) (third round)
21. Jing Junhong (SIN) (third round)
22. Wenling Tan Monfardini (ITA) (third round)
23. Ai Fujinuma (JPN) (second round)
24. Otilia Bădescu (ROU) (second round)
25. Kim Hyang-mi (PRK) (final, silver medalist)
26. Csilla Bátorfi (HUN) (second round)
27. Chunli Li (NZL) (third round)
28. Elke Wosik (GER) (third round)
29. Zhang Xueling (SIN) (quarterfinals)
30. Svetlana Ganina (RUS) (third round)
31. Kim Yun-mi (PRK) (third round)
32. Adriana Zamfir (ROU) (fourth round)

== Draw ==
=== Finals ===
Semifinals
1	Zhang Yining (CHN)	13	11	11	5	11
4	Kim Kyung-ah (KOR)	11	8	6	11	8
25	Kim Hyang-mi (PRK)	8	11	0	8	11	11	11
6	Li Jiawei (SIN)	11	6	11	11	8	6	8

Gold medal match
1	Zhang Yining (CHN)	11	11	11	11
25	Kim Hyang-mi (PRK)	8	7	2	2
Bronze medal match
4	Kim Kyung-ah (KOR)	9	11	11	11	11
6	Li Jiawei (SIN)	11	8	7	5	8

=== Top half ===
==== Section 1 ====
Second round
27	C Li (NZL)	11	12	11	8	11
48	T Banh (USA)	8	10	9	11	9
30	S Ganina (RUS)	11	14	7	3	11	11
36	L Negrisoli (ITA)	9	12	11	11	6	9
19	N Struse (GER)	7	4	11	7	11
43	N Komwong (THA)	11	11	9	11	13
24	O Badescu (ROU)	6	9	11	3	11	6
44	M Kravchenko (ISR)	11	11	4	11	8	11

Third round
1	Zhang Y (CHN)	11	12	11	11
27	C Li (NZL)	8	10	5	7
11	Lau SF (HKG)	11	11	10	11	11
30	S Ganina (RUS)	3	6	12	5	6
16	V Pavlovich (BLR)	11	11	9	11	7	11
43	N Komwong (THA)	4	6	11	3	11	1
5	T Boroš (CRO)	11	11	11	11
44	M Kravchenko (ISR)	8	6	5	7

Fourth round
1	Zhang Y (CHN)	11	11	11	9	11
11	Lau SF (HKG)	5	7	3	11	5
16	V Pavlovich (BLR)	5	8	11	8	11	7
5	T Boroš (CRO)	11	11	9	11	6	11

Quarterfinals
1	Zhang Y (CHN)	12	15	13	11
5	T Boroš (CRO)	10	13	11	3

==== Section 2 ====
Second round
17	K Tóth (HUN)	10	12	14	11	15	11
52	O Oshonaike (NGR)	12	10	16	6	13	5
21	Jing J (SIN)	11	11	10	11	4	11
38	S Erdelji (SCG)	3	8	12	4	11	6
18	A Fukuhara (JPN)	5	7	11	11	11	9	11
39	M Miao (AUS)	11	11	9	6	6	11	9
22	W Tan Monfardini (ITA)	11	9	11	9	13	11
42	Huang I-h (TPE)	2	11	9	11	11	7

Third round
7	Tie YN (HKG)	11	6	12	14	11
17	K Tóth (HUN)	6	11	10	12	6
15	Kim H-h (PRK)	7	11	6	11	11	11
21	Jing J (SIN)	11	8	11	5	4	9
10	Gao J (USA)	3	6	8	9
18	A Fukuhara (JPN)	11	11	11	11
4	Kim K-a (KOR)	9	11	11	11	11
22	W Tan Monfardini (ITA)	11	7	5	3	9

Fourth round
7	Tie YN (HKG)	11	11	11	8	11
15	Kim H-h (PRK)	6	7	4	11	8
18	A Fukuhara (JPN)	8	5	11	13	6
4	Kim K-a (KOR)	11	11	7	15	11

Quarterfinals
7	Tie YN (HKG)	6	12	9	7	7
4	Kim K-a (KOR)	11	10	11	11	11

=== Bottom half ===
==== Section 3 ====
Second round
28	E Wosik (GER)	3	11	6	11	11	12
41	JF Lay (AUS)	11	6	11	7	8	10
25	Kim H-m (PRK)	11	11	9	11	11
34	M Fazekas (HUN)	7	8	11	8	8
29	Zhang X (SIN)	11	11	8	11	11
45	J Reed (USA)	7	7	11	7	5
23	A Fujinuma (JPN)	13	11	14	11
46	Wu X (DOM)	11	7	12	5

Third round
3	Niu J (CHN)	12	12	11	10	11	11	11
28	E Wosik (GER)	14	14	5	12	6	2	6
12	M Steff (ROU)	11	8	7	7	11	9
25	Kim H-m (PRK)	7	11	11	11	6	11
14	Lee E-s (KOR)	5	7	9	11	6
29	Zhang X (SIN)	11	11	11	9	11
8	Liu J (AUT)	11	11	10	6	7	11	7
23	A Fujinuma (JPN)	7	6	12	11	11	8	11

Fourth round
3	Niu J (CHN)	8	9	9	4
25	Kim H-m (PRK)	11	11	11	11
29	Zhang X (SIN)	11	11	6	11	9	11
23	A Fujinuma (JPN)	7	8	11	7	11	9

Quarterfinals
25	Kim H-m (PRK)	11	11	9	11	8	12
29	Zhang X (SIN)	7	4	11	8	11	10

==== Section 4 ====
Second round
26	C Bátorfi (HUN)	7	11	18	6	8	11	10
50	P Cada (CAN)	11	9	16	11	11	8	12
20	J Schöpp (GER)	11	11	11	12	11
33	N Stefanova (ITA)	5	13	5	10	7
32	A Zamfir (ROU)	8	11	11	11	11
56	Z Shaban (JOR)	11	5	8	5	4
31	Kim Y-m (PRK)	11	11	11	11
60	C Offiong (NGR)	5	7	6	8

Third round
6	Li J (SIN)	11	11	11	11
50	P Cada (CAN)	4	6	7	8
13	A Umemura (JPN)	15	9	12	4	11	11
20	J Schöpp (GER)	13	11	10	11	7	3
9	Lin L (HKG)	6	7	11	8	11	10
32	A Zamfir (ROU)	11	11	5	11	7	12
2	Wang N (CHN)	11	13	8	11	11	11
31	Kim Y-m (PRK)	6	15	11	2	5	9

Fourth round
6	Li J (SIN)	14	13	8	15	9	11
13	A Umemura (JPN)	12	11	11	13	11	7
32	A Zamfir (ROU)	11	8	2	9	4
2	Wang N (CHN)	9	11	11	11	11

Quarterfinals
6	Li J (SIN)	11	11	11	11	11
2	Wang N (CHN)	7	7	13	9	8

== Preliminary round ==
=== Top half ===
==== Section 1 ====
First round
47	Yun J-y (KOR)	11	9	11	14	11	8	6
48	T Banh (USA)	8	11	9	16	3	11	11
54	F Ramos (VEN)	9	5	6	11	3
36	L Negrisoli (ITA)	11	11	11	8	11
43	N Komwong (THA)	11	11	11	12
51	M Das (IND)	6	7	3	10
44	M Kravchenko (ISR)	11	11	11	11
49	A Volakaki (GRE)	6	5	4	5

==== Section 2 ====
First round
52	O Oshonaike (NGR)	11	11	11	11
53	B Rodriguez (CHI)	9	8	7	9
38	S Erdelji (SCG)	11	11	11	11
64	N Ben Kahia (TUN)	3	1	3	7
58	M Espineira (PER)	11	11	5	4	6	6
39	M Miao (AUS)	8	9	11	11	11	11
61	L Boucetta (ALG)	8	3	4	8
42	Huang I-h (TPE)	11	11	11	11

=== Bottom half ===
==== Section 3 ====
First round
37	Cornelia Vaida (CRO)	10	5	6	11
41	JF Lay (AUS)	12	11	11	13
59	M Inoyatova (UZB)	6	7	3	7
34	M Fazekas (HUN)	11	11	11	11
45	J Reed (USA)	9	6	15	11	11	11
35	R Strbikova (CZE)	11	11	13	4	8	9
40	O Fadeyeva (RUS)	11	8	6	7	9
46	Wu X (DOM)	9	11	11	11	11

==== Section 4 ====
First round
50	P Cada (CAN)	11	11	11	11
62	O Guenni (TUN)	4	7	4	7
63	A Menaifi (ALG)	6	8	6	6
33	N Stefanova (ITA)	11	11	11	11
56	Z Shaban (JOR)	11	11	11	9	11	9	11
57	I Medina (HON)	7	13	8	11	5	11	9
60	C Offiong (NGR)	11	11	9	12	11
55	L Silva Santos (BRA)	8	6	11	10	8
