= Croatia at the 2004 Summer Olympics =

- IOC code: CRO
- NOC: Croatian Olympic Committee
- Website: www.hoo.hr (in Croatian and English)

in Athens
- Competitors: 81 in 14 sports
- Flag bearers: Dubravko Šimenc (opening); Siniša Skelin (closing)
- Medals Ranked 44th: Gold 1 Silver 2 Bronze 2 Total 5

Summer Olympics appearances (overview)
- 1992; 1996; 2000; 2004; 2008; 2012; 2016; 2020; 2024; 2028

Other related appearances
- Austria (1900); Yugoslavia (1920–1988)

Croatia competed at the 2004 Summer Olympics in Athens, Greece, from 13 to 29 August 2004. This was the nation's fourth consecutive appearance at the Summer Olympics since the post-Yugoslav era. The Croatian Olympic Committee (Croatian: Hrvatski olimpijski odbor, HOO) sent the nation's smallest delegation to the Games since its debut in 1992. A total of 81 athletes, 66 men and 15 women, competed in 14 sports. Men's water polo, and men's handball were the only team-based sports in which Croatia had its representation in these Olympic Games.

The Croatian team featured three Olympic medalists from Sydney: rowers and brothers Nikša and Siniša Skelin, and four-time Olympian and defending weightlifting champion Nikolaj Pešalov in the men's lightweight class. Table tennis player and Olympic silver medalist Zoran Primorac became the first Croatian to participate in five Olympic Games as an individual athlete (his first appearance competed under the former Socialist Federal Republic of Yugoslavia). Former Bosnian athlete and discus thrower Dragan Mustapić served as the team captain and oldest member of the team at age 41, while backstroke swimmer Sanja Jovanović was youngest at age 17. Three-time Olympic water polo player and two-time medalist Dubravko Šimenc was appointed by the committee to become the nation's flag bearer in the opening ceremony.

Croatia left Athens with a total of five medals (one gold, two silver, and two bronze), being considered as the nation's most successful Olympics in history based on the overall medal tally. All of these medals were awarded for the first time to the Croatian athletes in swimming, men's coxless pair in rowing, and men's tennis doubles. Meanwhile, Croatia men's handball team (led by team captain Venio Losert) proved particularly successful in Athens, as they beat the Germans for their only gold medal at these Games, adding it to their previous record from the 1996 Summer Olympics in Atlanta.

== Medalists ==
Medal	Name	Sport	Event	Date
Gold	Croatia men's national handball team: Ivano Balić; Davor Dominiković; Mirza Džomba; Slavko Goluža; Nikša Kaleb; Blaženko Lacković; Venio Losert; Valter Matošević; Petar Metličić; Vlado Šola; Denis Špoljarić; Goran Šprem; Igor Vori; Drago Vuković	Handball	Men's tournament	August 29
Silver	Duje Draganja	Swimming	Men's 50 m freestyle	August 20
Silver	Nikša Skelin; Siniša Skelin	Rowing	Men's pair	August 21
Bronze	Nikolaj Pešalov	Weightlifting	Men's 69 kg	August 18
Bronze	Mario Ančić; Ivan Ljubičić	Tennis	Men's doubles	August 21

== Athletics ==
Croatian athletes have so far achieved qualifying standards in the following athletics events (up to a maximum of 3 athletes in each event at the 'A' Standard, and 1 at the 'B' Standard).

Key

- Note–Ranks given for track events are within the athlete's heat only
- Q = Qualified for the next round
- q = Qualified for the next round as a fastest loser or, in field events, by position without achieving the qualifying target
- NR = National record
- N/A = Round not applicable for the event
- Bye = Athlete not required to compete in round

Men
Track & road events

Athlete	Event	Heat		Quarterfinal		Semifinal		Final	
Athlete	Event	Result	Rank	Result	Rank	Result	Rank	Result	Rank
Jurica Grabušić	110 m hurdles	13.87	8	Did not advance					
Branko Zorko	1500 m	3:48.28	10	—N/a		Did not advance			

Field events

Athlete	Event	Qualification		Final	
Athlete	Event	Distance	Position	Distance	Position
Siniša Ergotić	Long jump	7.77	26	Did not advance	
Edis Elkasević	Shot put	18.44	36	Did not advance	
András Haklits	Hammer throw	74.43	21	Did not advance	
Nedžad Mulabegović	Shot put	19.07	29	Did not advance	
Dragan Mustapić	Discus throw	54.66	34	Did not advance	
Edi Ponoš	Javelin throw	71.43	33	Did not advance	

Women
Field events

Athlete	Event	Qualification		Final	
Athlete	Event	Distance	Position	Distance	Position
Vera Begić	Discus throw	57.31	29	Did not advance	
Ivana Brkljačić	Hammer throw	68.21	13	Did not advance	
Sanja Gavrilović	Hammer throw	56.79	45	Did not advance	
Blanka Vlašić	High jump	1.95	7 Q	1.89	11

== Boxing ==
Croatia sent two boxers to the 2004 Summer Olympics.

Athlete	Event	Round of 32	Round of 16	Quarterfinals	Semifinals	Final	
Athlete	Event	Opposition Result	Opposition Result	Opposition Result	Opposition Result	Opposition Result	Rank
Marijo Šivolija	Light heavyweight	Muñoz (VEN); L 23–31	Did not advance				
Vedran Đipalo	Heavyweight	—N/a	Forsyth (AUS); L 22–32	Did not advance			

== Canoeing ==
=== Slalom ===
Athlete	Event	Preliminary						Semifinal		Final			
Athlete	Event	Run 1	Rank	Run 2	Rank	Total	Rank	Time	Rank	Time	Rank	Total	Rank
Danko Herceg	Men's C-1	103.84	7	100.33	3	204.17	6 Q	203.49	12	Did not advance			
Dinko Mulić	Men's K-1	102.71	20	108.05	24	210.76	22	Did not advance					

=== Sprint ===
Athlete	Event	Heats		Semifinals		Final	
Athlete	Event	Time	Rank	Time	Rank	Time	Rank
Emanuel Horvatiček	Men's C-1 500 m	1:55.528	5 q	2:06.347	8	Did not advance	
Emanuel Horvatiček	Men's C-1 1000 m	4:27.662	7 q	4:24.604	7	Did not advance	

Qualification Legend: Q = Qualify to final; q = Qualify to semifinal

== Equestrian ==
=== Eventing ===
Athlete	Horse	Event	Dressage		Cross-country			Jumping						Total	
Athlete	Horse	Event	Dressage		Cross-country			Qualifier			Final			Total	
Athlete	Horse	Event	Penalties	Rank	Penalties	Total	Rank	Penalties	Total	Rank	Penalties	Total	Rank	Penalties	Rank
Pepo Puch	Banville d'Ivoy	Individual	68.60	65	80.60	149.20	66	9.00	158.20	63	Did not advance			158.20	63

== Handball ==
Summary

Key:

- ET – After extra time
- P – Match decided by penalty-shootout.

Team	Event	Group Stage						Quarterfinal	Semifinal	Final / BM	
Team	Event	Opposition Score	Opposition Score	Opposition Score	Opposition Score	Opposition Score	Rank	Opposition Score	Opposition Score	Opposition Score	Rank
Croatia men's	Men's tournament	Iceland; W 34–30	Slovenia; W 27–26	South Korea; W 29–26	Russia; W 26–25	Spain; W 30–22	1	Greece; W 33–27	Hungary; W 33–31	Germany; W 26–24	1st place, gold medalist(s)

=== Men's tournament ===
Roster

The following is the Croatia roster in the men's handball tournament of the 2004 Summer Olympics.

Head coaches: Lino Červar

No.	Pos.	Name	Date of birth (age)	Height	App.	Goals	Club
1	GK	Venio Losert	25 July 1976 (aged 28)	1.91 m			(Spain) BM Granollers
2	LW	Nikša Kaleb	9 March 1973 (aged 31)	1.84 m			(Croatia) RK Zagreb
4	CB	Ivano Balić	1 April 1979 (aged 25)	1.89 m			(Spain) Portland San Antonio
6	LB	Blaženko Lacković	25 December 1980 (aged 23)	1.95 m			(Germany) SG Flensburg
7	RW	Vedran Zrnić	26 September 1979 (aged 24)	1.88 m			(Slovenia) RK Gorenje Velenje
9	P	Igor Vori	20 September 1980 (aged 23)	2.02 m			(Croatia) RK Zagreb
10	LB	Davor Dominiković	7 April 1978 (aged 26)	2.03 m			(Germany) Kronau Ostringen
11	RW	Mirza Džomba	28 February 1977 (aged 27)	1.90 m			(Spain) BM Ciudad Real
12	GK	Vlado Šola	17 November 1968 (aged 35)	1.94 m			(Hungary) Fotex Veszprem
14	RB	Drago Vuković	3 August 1983 (aged 21)	1.94 m			(Croatia) RK Zagreb
15	CB	Slavko Goluža	17 September 1971 (aged 32)	1.95 m			(Hungary) Fotex Veszprem
16	GK	Valter Matošević	11 June 1970 (aged 34)	1.93 m			(Germany) Wilhelmshavener HV
17	LW	Goran Šprem	6 July 1979 (aged 25)	1.83 m			(Croatia) RK Zagreb
18	CB	Denis Špoljarić	20 August 1979 (aged 24)	1.94 m			(Croatia) RK Zagreb
19	RB	Petar Metličić	25 December 1976 (aged 27)	1.94 m			(Spain) CB Ademar León

Group play

Pos	Team	Pld	W	D	L	GF	GA	GD	Pts	Qualification
1	Croatia	5	5	0	0	146	129	+17	10	Quarterfinals
2	Spain	5	4	0	1	154	137	+17	8	Quarterfinals
3	South Korea	5	2	0	3	148	148	0	4 (Note: South Korea 35–32 Russia)	Quarterfinals
4	Russia	5	2	0	3	145	145	0	4	Quarterfinals
5	Iceland	5	1	0	4	143	158	−15	2 (Note: Iceland 30–25 Slovenia)	
6	Slovenia	5	1	0	4	130	149	−19	2	

Rules for classification: 1) Points; 2) Head-to-head points; 3) Head-to-head goal difference; 4) Head-to-head goals scored; 5) Goal difference; 6) Goals scored; 7) Draw.
Notes:

14 August 2004; 19:30	Croatia	34 - 30	Iceland	Sports Pavilion, Athens; Referees: Lemme, Ullrich (GER)
14 August 2004; 19:30	Metličić 8	(16-12)	Stefansson 8	Sports Pavilion, Athens; Referees: Lemme, Ullrich (GER)
14 August 2004; 19:30	3× (yellow card) 9× (suspension)		3× (yellow card) 7× (suspension) 1× (red card)	Sports Pavilion, Athens; Referees: Lemme, Ullrich (GER)

16 August 2004; 11:30	Slovenia	26 - 27	Croatia	Sports Pavilion, Athens; Referees: Oie, Togstad (NOR)
16 August 2004; 11:30	Brumen 10	(10-13)	Vori 8	Sports Pavilion, Athens; Referees: Oie, Togstad (NOR)
16 August 2004; 11:30	3× (yellow card) 7× (suspension) 2× (red card)		3× (yellow card) 7× (suspension) 1× (red card)	Sports Pavilion, Athens; Referees: Oie, Togstad (NOR)

18 August 2004; 09:30	Croatia	29 - 26	South Korea	Sports Pavilion, Athens; Referees: Bord, Buy (FRA)
18 August 2004; 09:30	Džomba 9	(12-10)	Yoon 8	Sports Pavilion, Athens; Referees: Bord, Buy (FRA)
18 August 2004; 09:30	3× (yellow card) 6× (suspension)		3× (yellow card) 3× (suspension)	Sports Pavilion, Athens; Referees: Bord, Buy (FRA)

20 August 2004; 19:30	Russia	25 - 26	Croatia	Sports Pavilion, Athens; Referees: Hansson, Olsson (SWE)
20 August 2004; 19:30	Torgovanov, Rastvortsev 6	(14-10)	Lacković 9	Sports Pavilion, Athens; Referees: Hansson, Olsson (SWE)
20 August 2004; 19:30	2× (yellow card) 5× (suspension)		3× (yellow card) 3× (suspension)	Sports Pavilion, Athens; Referees: Hansson, Olsson (SWE)

22 August 2004; 11:30	Croatia	30 - 22	Spain	Sports Pavilion, Athens; Referees: Baum, Goralczyk (POL)
22 August 2004; 11:30	Džomba 7	(15-9)	García 5	Sports Pavilion, Athens; Referees: Baum, Goralczyk (POL)
22 August 2004; 11:30	3× (yellow card) 1× (suspension)		3× (yellow card) 4× (suspension)	Sports Pavilion, Athens; Referees: Baum, Goralczyk (POL)

Quarterfinal

24 August 2004; 16:30	Croatia	33 - 27	Greece	Sports Pavilion, Athens; Referees: Lemme, Ullrich (GER)
24 August 2004; 16:30	Džomba 11	(19-11)	Balomenos, Alvanos 6	Sports Pavilion, Athens; Referees: Lemme, Ullrich (GER)
24 August 2004; 16:30	3× (yellow card)		4× (yellow card) 2× (suspension)	Sports Pavilion, Athens; Referees: Lemme, Ullrich (GER)

Semifinal

27 August 2004; 14:30	Croatia	33 - 31	Hungary	Sports Pavilion, Athens; Referees: Arnaldsson, Vidarsson (ISL)
27 August 2004; 14:30	Balić 9	(18-16)	Pérez 8	Sports Pavilion, Athens; Referees: Arnaldsson, Vidarsson (ISL)
27 August 2004; 14:30	3× (yellow card) 3× (suspension)		3× (yellow card) 2× (suspension)	Sports Pavilion, Athens; Referees: Arnaldsson, Vidarsson (ISL)

Gold Medal Final

29 August 2004; 16:45	Croatia	26 - 24	Germany	Sports Pavilion, Athens; Referees: Hansson, Olsson (SWE)
29 August 2004; 16:45	Džomba 9	(11-12)	Kretzschmar 9	Sports Pavilion, Athens; Referees: Hansson, Olsson (SWE)
29 August 2004; 16:45	3× (yellow card) 2× (suspension)		3× (yellow card) 5× (suspension)	Sports Pavilion, Athens; Referees: Hansson, Olsson (SWE)

Won Gold Medal

== Rowing ==
Croatian rowers qualified the following boats:

Men

Athlete	Event	Heats		Repechage		Semifinals		Final	
Athlete	Event	Time	Rank	Time	Rank	Time	Rank	Time	Rank
Nikša Skelin; Siniša Skelin	Pair	7:01.28	2 SA/B	Bye		6:23.57	2 FA	6:32.64	2nd place, silver medalist(s)
Igor Boraska; Marko Dragičević; Petar Milin; Damir Vučičić	Four	6:34.05	4 R	5:58.48	3 SA/B	6:05.54	6 FB	5:57.36	12

Qualification Legend: FA=Final A (medal); FB=Final B (non-medal); FC=Final C (non-medal); FD=Final D (non-medal); FE=Final E (non-medal); FF=Final F (non-medal); SA/B=Semifinals A/B; SC/D=Semifinals C/D; SE/F=Semifinals E/F; R=Repechage

== Sailing ==
Croatian sailors have qualified one boat for each of the following events.

Men

Athlete	Event	Race											Net points	Final rank
Athlete	Event	1	2	3	4	5	6	7	8	9	10	M*	Net points	Final rank
Karlo Kuret	Finn	6	2	10	8	12	~~18~~	7	5	3	3	5	61	4
Tomislav Bašić; Petar Cupać	470	16	10	19	5	20	~~26~~	21	25	1	7	12	136	19

Open

Athlete	Event	Race											Net points	Final rank
Athlete	Event	1	2	3	4	5	6	7	8	9	10	M*	Net points	Final rank
Mate Arapov	Laser	6	11	2	22	~~OCS~~	13	3	25	29	25	3	139	14

M = Medal race; OCS = On course side of the starting line; DSQ = Disqualified; DNF = Did not finish; DNS= Did not start; RDG = Redress given

== Shooting ==
Women

Athlete	Event	Qualification		Final	
Athlete	Event	Points	Rank	Points	Rank
Mirela Skoko-Ćelić	10 m air pistol	381	15	Did not advance	
Mirela Skoko-Ćelić	25 m pistol	569	=27	Did not advance	

== Swimming ==
Croatian swimmers earned qualifying standards in the following events (up to a maximum of 2 swimmers in each event at the A-standard time, and 1 at the B-standard time):

Men

Athlete	Event	Heat		Semifinal		Final	
Athlete	Event	Time	Rank	Time	Rank	Time	Rank
Nenad Buljan	400 m freestyle	4:02.76	37	—N/a		Did not advance	
Nenad Buljan	1500 m freestyle	15:56.54	29	—N/a		Did not advance	
Krešimir Čač	200 m individual medley	2:05.33	34	Did not advance			
Mario Delač	200 m freestyle	1:55.82	54	Did not advance			
Duje Draganja	50 m freestyle	22.28	5 Q	22.19	8 Q	21.94 NR	2nd place, silver medalist(s)
Duje Draganja	100 m freestyle	49.07	4 Q	49.14	6 Q	49.23	6
Duje Draganja	100 m butterfly	52.56	6 Q	52.74	8 Q	52.46	7
Saša Imprić	400 m individual medley	4:32.02	32	—N/a		Did not advance	
Gordan Kožulj	100 m backstroke	55.80	16 Q	56.02	14	Did not advance	
Gordan Kožulj	200 m backstroke	2:00.94	12 Q	1:59.61	9	Did not advance	
Vanja Rogulj	100 m breaststroke	1:03.16	26	Did not advance			
Vanja Rogulj	200 m breaststroke	2:18.81	37	Did not advance			
Igor Čerenšek; Mario Delač; Duje Draganja; Ivan Mladina	4 × 100 m freestyle relay	3:21.01	13	—N/a		Did not advance	

Women

Athlete	Event	Heat		Semifinal		Final	
Athlete	Event	Time	Rank	Time	Rank	Time	Rank
Petra Banović	200 m freestyle	2:04.24	32	Did not advance			
Petra Banović	200 m individual medley	2:20.83	25	Did not advance			
Anita Galić	400 m freestyle	4:26.09	37	—N/a		Did not advance	
Anita Galić	800 m freestyle	9:10.91	28	—N/a		Did not advance	
Sanja Jovanović	100 m backstroke	1:02.47	=17	Did not advance			
Sanja Jovanović	200 m backstroke	2:15.01	16 Q	2:13.76	13	Did not advance	
Smiljana Marinović	100 m breaststroke	1:11.00	20	Did not advance			
Smiljana Marinović	200 m breaststroke	2:32.52	17	Did not advance			

== Table tennis ==
Three Croatian table tennis players qualified for the following events.

Men

Athlete	Event	Round 1	Round 2	Round 3	Round 4	Quarterfinals	Semifinals	Final / BM	
Athlete	Event	Opposition Result	Opposition Result	Opposition Result	Opposition Result	Opposition Result	Opposition Result	Opposition Result	Rank
Zoran Primorac	Men's singles	Bye	Miličević (BIH); W 4–1	Ma L (CHN); L 1–4	Did not advance				
Tamara Boroš	Women's singles	Bye		Kravchenko (ISR); W 4–0	Pavlovich (BLR); W 4–2	Zhang Yn (CHN); L 0–4	Did not advance		
Cornelia Vaida	Women's singles	Lay (AUS); L 0–4	Did not advance						
Tamara Boroš; Cornelia Vaida	Women's doubles	Bye		Štrbíková / Vachovcová (CZE); W 4–1	Bátorfi / Tóth (HUN); W 4–1	Kim B-R / Kim K-A (KOR); L 0–4	Did not advance		

== Taekwondo ==
Two Croatian taekwondo jin qualified for the following events.

Athlete	Event	Round of 16	Quarterfinals	Semifinals	Repechage 1	Repechage 2	Final / BM	
Athlete	Event	Opposition Result	Opposition Result	Opposition Result	Opposition Result	Opposition Result	Opposition Result	Rank
Sandra Šarić	Women's −67 kg	Solheim (NOR); L 2–5	Did not advance					
Nataša Vezmar	Women's +67 kg	Bye	Dawani (JOR); L 4–5	Did not advance				

== Tennis ==
Croatia nominated three male and two female tennis players in the tournament.

Athlete	Event	Round of 64	Round of 32	Round of 16	Quarterfinals	Semifinals	Final / BM	
Athlete	Event	Opposition Score	Opposition Score	Opposition Score	Opposition Score	Opposition Score	Opposition Score	Rank
Mario Ančić	Men's singles	Haas (GER); L 1–6, 5–7	Did not advance					
Ivo Karlović	Men's singles	Pavel (ROM); W 6–4, 6–7^{(10–12)}, 6–2	Clément (FRA); W 7–6^{(7–4)}, 4–6, 6–4	Moyá (ESP); L 6–4, 6–7^{(3–7)}, 4–6	Did not advance			
Ivan Ljubičić	Men's singles	Sargsian (ARM); W 6–3, 6–2	Johansson (SWE); W 7–6^{(7–3)}, 6–4	Dent (USA); L 4–6, 4–6	Did not advance			
Mario Ančić; Ivan Ljubičić	Men's doubles	—N/a	Björkman / Johansson (SWE); W RET	Damm / Suk (CZE); W 7–6^{(8–6)}, 6–7^{(2–7)}, 7–5	Llodra / Santoro (FRA); W 4–6, 6–3, 9–7	González / Massú (CHI); L 5–7, 6–4, 4–6	Bhupathi / Paes (IND); W 7–6^{(7–5)}, 4–6, 16–14	3rd place, bronze medalist(s)
Jelena Kostanić	Women's singles	Brandi (PUR); L 5–7, 1–6	Did not advance					
Karolina Šprem	Women's singles	Dulko (ARG); W 6–4, 7–6^{(8–6)}, 7–5	Widjaja (INA); W 6–3, 6–1	Sugiyama (JPN); L 6–7^{(6–8)}, 1–6	Did not advance			
Jelena Kostanić; Karolina Šprem	Women's doubles	—N/a	Prakusya / Widjaja (INA); W 6–3, 6–2	Asagoe / Sugiyama (JPN); L 3–6, 5–7	Did not advance			

== Water polo ==
=== Men's tournament ===
Roster

The following is the Croatian roster in the men's water polo tournament of the 2004 Summer Olympics.

Head coach: Zoran Roje

№	Name	Pos.	Height	Weight	Date of birth	2004 club
1	Frano Vićan	GK	1.93 m (6 ft 4 in)	92 kg (203 lb)	24 January 1976	(Italy) Sportiva Nervi
2	Damir Burić	CB	2.05 m (6 ft 9 in)	112 kg (247 lb)	2 December 1980	(Croatia) VK Primorje
3	Tihomil Vranješ	D	1.89 m (6 ft 2 in)	87 kg (192 lb)	10 November 1977	(Croatia) VK Jug Dubrovnik
4	Dubravko Šimenc	CB	2.01 m (6 ft 7 in)	115 kg (254 lb)	2 November 1966	(Italy) Bissolati Cremona
5	Goran Volarević	GK	1.89 m (6 ft 2 in)	91 kg (201 lb)	2 April 1977	(Croatia) VK Jug Dubrovnik
6	Ratko Štritof (C)	CB	1.95 m (6 ft 5 in)	102 kg (225 lb)	14 January 1972	(Italy) Circolo Nautico Posillipo
7	Mile Smodlaka	CF	1.98 m (6 ft 6 in)	115 kg (254 lb)	1 January 1976	(Croatia) VK Jug Dubrovnik
8	Danijel Premuš	CF	1.86 m (6 ft 1 in)	98 kg (216 lb)	15 April 1981	(Croatia) VK Primorje
9	Nikola Franković	D	1.92 m (6 ft 4 in)	98 kg (216 lb)	9 November 1982	(Croatia) VK Primorje
10	Samir Barač	D	1.88 m (6 ft 2 in)	93 kg (205 lb)	2 November 1973	(Italy) Leonessa Brescia
11	Igor Hinić	CF	2.02 m (6 ft 8 in)	110 kg (240 lb)	4 December 1975	(Italy) Leonessa Brescia
12	Elvis Fatović	D	1.85 m (6 ft 1 in)	87 kg (192 lb)	8 May 1971	(Croatia) VK Jug Dubrovnik
13	Vjekoslav Kobešćak	D	1.89 m (6 ft 2 in)	89 kg (196 lb)	20 January 1974	(Croatia) HAVK Mladost

Group play

Pos	Team	Pld	W	D	L	GF	GA	GD	Pts	Qualification
1	Hungary	5	5	0	0	44	27	+17	10	Qualified for the semifinals
2	Serbia and Montenegro	5	4	0	1	37	26	+11	8	Qualified for the quarterfinals
3	Russia	5	3	0	2	32	28	+4	6	Qualified for the quarterfinals
4	United States	5	2	0	3	32	37	−5	4	
5	Croatia	5	1	0	4	35	41	−6	2	
6	Kazakhstan	5	0	0	5	21	42	−21	0	

15 August 2004; 22:15	Croatia	6–7	United States	Athens Olympic Aquatic Centre; Referees: Tulga (TUR), Bookelman (NED)
15 August 2004; 22:15	Score by quarters: 0-0, 0-3, 2-1, 4-3			Athens Olympic Aquatic Centre; Referees: Tulga (TUR), Bookelman (NED)
15 August 2004; 22:15	Štritof 3	Goals	Azevedo 3	Athens Olympic Aquatic Centre; Referees: Tulga (TUR), Bookelman (NED)

17 August 2004; 22:15	Hungary	10–8	Croatia	Athens Olympic Aquatic Centre; Referees: Borrell (ESP), Bookelman (NED)
17 August 2004; 22:15	Score by quarters: 1-0, 4-2, 4-4, 1-2			Athens Olympic Aquatic Centre; Referees: Borrell (ESP), Bookelman (NED)
17 August 2004; 22:15	Kásás, Biros 3	Goals	Burić, Štritof 2	Athens Olympic Aquatic Centre; Referees: Borrell (ESP), Bookelman (NED)

19 August 2004; 22:15	Croatia	8–9	Russia	Athens Olympic Aquatic Centre; Referees: Stavropoulos (GRE), Kratochvil (SVK)
19 August 2004; 22:15	Score by quarters: 2-2, 2-3, 1-1, 3-3			Athens Olympic Aquatic Centre; Referees: Stavropoulos (GRE), Kratochvil (SVK)
19 August 2004; 22:15	Franković, Fatović 2	Goals	Zinnourov 2	Athens Olympic Aquatic Centre; Referees: Stavropoulos (GRE), Kratochvil (SVK)

21 August 2004; 21:00	Serbia and Montenegro	11–8	Croatia	Athens Olympic Aquatic Centre; Referees: Petronilli (ITA), Bookelman (NED)
21 August 2004; 21:00	Score by quarters: 2-1, 4-2, 3-3, 2-2			Athens Olympic Aquatic Centre; Referees: Petronilli (ITA), Bookelman (NED)
21 August 2004; 21:00	Šapić 5	Goals	3 players with 2	Athens Olympic Aquatic Centre; Referees: Petronilli (ITA), Bookelman (NED)

23 August 2004; 10:45	Croatia	5–4	Kazakhstan	Athens Olympic Aquatic Centre; Referees: Matache (ROU), Rezek (CZE)
23 August 2004; 10:45	Score by quarters: 2-2, 2-0, 0-0, 1-2			Athens Olympic Aquatic Centre; Referees: Matache (ROU), Rezek (CZE)
23 August 2004; 10:45	Smodlaka 2	Goals	4 players with 1	Athens Olympic Aquatic Centre; Referees: Matache (ROU), Rezek (CZE)

7th-12th Classification Quarterfinal

25 August 2004; 10:45	Croatia	12–1	Egypt	Athens Olympic Aquatic Centre; Referees: Zhong (CHN), Pinker (RSA)
25 August 2004; 10:45	Score by quarters: 4-0, 2-0, 4-0, 2-1			Athens Olympic Aquatic Centre; Referees: Zhong (CHN), Pinker (RSA)
25 August 2004; 10:45	Burić 3	Goals	Rezk 1	Athens Olympic Aquatic Centre; Referees: Zhong (CHN), Pinker (RSA)

7th-10th Classification Semifinal

27 August 2004; 17:00	Italy	11–7	Croatia	Athens Olympic Aquatic Centre; Referees: Afanasiev (RUS), Koryzna (POL)
27 August 2004; 17:00	Score by quarters: 2-1, 3-4, 1-1, 5-1			Athens Olympic Aquatic Centre; Referees: Afanasiev (RUS), Koryzna (POL)
27 August 2004; 17:00	Bencivenga 3	Goals	Franković 3	Athens Olympic Aquatic Centre; Referees: Afanasiev (RUS), Koryzna (POL)

9th-10th Place Classification

29 August 2004; 09:30	Australia	8–7	Croatia	Athens Olympic Aquatic Centre; Referees: Kiszelly (HUN), Sayed Mahmoud (EGY)
29 August 2004; 09:30	Score by quarters: 2-0, 3-4, 1-1, 2-2			Athens Olympic Aquatic Centre; Referees: Kiszelly (HUN), Sayed Mahmoud (EGY)
29 August 2004; 09:30	Whalan 5	Goals	Franković 3	Athens Olympic Aquatic Centre; Referees: Kiszelly (HUN), Sayed Mahmoud (EGY)

== Weightlifting ==
Athlete	Event	Snatch		Clean & Jerk		Total	Rank
Athlete	Event	Result	Rank	Result	Rank	Total	Rank
Nikolaj Pešalov	Men's −69 kg	150	3	187.5	=2	337.5	3rd place, bronze medalist(s)

== See also ==
- Croatia at the 2004 Summer Paralympics
- Croatia at the 2005 Mediterranean Games
