= Table tennis at the 2011 Arab Games =

At the 2011 Pan Arab Games, the table tennis events were held at Aspire Zone in Doha, Qatar from 10–15 December. A total of 6 events were contested.

== Medal summary ==
=== Men ===
Event	Gold	Silver	Bronze
Singles	El-sayed Lashin (EGY)	Omar Assar (EGY)	Khalid Alharbi (KSA)
Singles	El-sayed Lashin (EGY)	Omar Assar (EGY)	Mounaime Tirselt (MAR)
Doubles	Egypt (EGY); El-sayed Lashin; Ahmed Saleh	Kuwait (KUW); Ibrahem Alhasan; Salem Alhasan	Saudi Arabia (KSA); Abdulaziz Alabbad; Khalid Alharbi
Doubles	Egypt (EGY); El-sayed Lashin; Ahmed Saleh	Kuwait (KUW); Ibrahem Alhasan; Salem Alhasan	Bahrain (BHR); Hamad Buhijji; Mohamed Bushelaibi
Team	Egypt (EGY); Omar Assar; Mohamed Elbeiali; Emad Elsayid; El-sayed Lashin; Ahmed Saleh	Saudi Arabia (KSA); Faisal Almutairi; Naif Aljadai; Khalid Alharbi; Akram Alghamdi; Abdulaziz Alabbad	United Arab Emirates (UAE); Mohamed Albahar; Rashed Hassan; Jassem Linjawi; Rashid Omar
Team	Egypt (EGY); Omar Assar; Mohamed Elbeiali; Emad Elsayid; El-sayed Lashin; Ahmed Saleh	Saudi Arabia (KSA); Faisal Almutairi; Naif Aljadai; Khalid Alharbi; Akram Alghamdi; Abdulaziz Alabbad	Lebanon (LIB); Dauud Cheaib; Rachid El Boubou; Mohamad El Habech; Malek El Tawil

=== Women ===
Event	Gold	Silver	Bronze
Singles	Dina Meshref (EGY)	Nadeen El-Dawlatly (EGY)	Olfa Guenni (TUN)
Singles	Dina Meshref (EGY)	Nadeen El-Dawlatly (EGY)	Safa Saidani (TUN)
Doubles	Egypt (EGY); Nadeen El-Dawlatly; Dina Meshref	Qatar (QAT); Maha Faramarzi; Aia Mohamed	Tunisia (TUN); Olfa Guenni; Safa Saidani
Doubles	Egypt (EGY); Nadeen El-Dawlatly; Dina Meshref	Qatar (QAT); Maha Faramarzi; Aia Mohamed	Lebanon (LIB); Noel Kechechian; Lara Kejebachian
Team	Egypt (EGY); Nadeen El-Dawlatly; Farah Hassan; Sara Hassan; Dina Meshref	Tunisia (TUN); Sarra Ben Slama; Olfa Guenni; Safa Saidani; Fidel Toumi	Lebanon (LIB); Rita Bsaibes; Noel Kechechian; Lara Kejebachian; Tvin Carole Moumjoghlian

== Medal table ==
* Host nation (Qatar)

Rank	Nation	Gold	Silver	Bronze	Total
1	Egypt	6	2	0	8
2	Tunisia	0	1	3	4
3	Saudi Arabia	0	1	2	3
4	Kuwait	0	1	0	1
4	Qatar*	0	1	0	1
6	Lebanon	0	0	3	3
7	Bahrain	0	0	1	1
7	Morocco	0	0	1	1
7	United Arab Emirates	0	0	1	1
Totals (9 entries)		6	6	11	23
