= Table tennis at the 1991 European Youth Olympic Days =

Sports competition in Brussels, Belgium

The table tennis competition at the 1991 European Youth Olympic Days was held from 18 to 20 July. The events took place in Brussels, Belgium. Girls and boys born 1976 or 1977 or later participated in the event. The competition consisted of ingles competition and a mixed team event.

== Medal summary ==
=== Men ===
| Event | Gold | Silver | Bronze |
|---|---|---|---|
| Men's singles | Armand Phung; France | Serguei Sokolovsky; Soviet Union | Eric Varin; France |
| Women's singles | Svetlana Bakhtina; Soviet Union | Anne Guillerm; France | Silvija Erdelji; Serbia and Montenegro |
| Men's singles | Sweden | France | Bulgaria |
