= Yun Ji-hye =

Yun Ji-hye may refer to:

- Yoon Ji-hye (born 1979), South Korean actress
- Yun Ji-hye (table tennis) (born 1983)
- Yun Ji-hye (taekwondo) (born 1997), South Korean taekwondo practitioner
