= Jing Junhong =

Chinese-born Singaporean table tennis player

Personal information
- Native name: 井浚泓
- Nationality: Singapore
- Born: 13 October 1968 (age 57) Shanghai, China
- Height: 1.63 m (5 ft 4 in)
- Weight: 58 kg (128 lb; 9.1 st)

Sport
- Sport: Table tennis
Medal record
Women's table tennis
Representing Singapore
Event	1st	2nd	3rd
Asian Games	0	0	1
Asian Championships	0	2	0
Asian Cup	0	1	0
Commonwealth Games	2	0	2
Southeast Asian Games	10	2	4
Total	12	5	7
Asian Games
Bronze medal – third place	2002 Busan	Team
Asian Championships
Silver medal – second place	1992 New Delhi	Doubles
Asian Cup
Silver medal – second place	1994 Shanghai	Singles
Commonwealth Games
Gold medal – first place	2002 Manchester	Doubles
Gold medal – first place	2002 Manchester	Team
Bronze medal – third place	2002 Manchester	Singles
Bronze medal – third place	2002 Manchester	Mixed doubles
Southeast Asian Games
Gold medal – first place	1995 Chiang Mai	Singles
Gold medal – first place	1997 Jakarta	Singles
Gold medal – first place	1999 Bandar Seri Begawan	Doubles
Gold medal – first place	1999 Bandar Seri Begawan	Mixed doubles
Gold medal – first place	1999 Bandar Seri Begawan	Team
Gold medal – first place	2001 Kuala Lumpur	Doubles
Gold medal – first place	2001 Kuala Lumpur	Mixed doubles
Gold medal – first place	2001 Kuala Lumpur	Team
Gold medal – first place	2003 Vietnam	Doubles
Gold medal – first place	2003 Vietnam	Team
Silver medal – second place	1997 Jakarta	Mixed doubles
Silver medal – second place	2003 Vietnam	Mixed doubles
Bronze medal – third place	1997 Jakarta	Doubles
Bronze medal – third place	1997 Jakarta	Team
Bronze medal – third place	1999 Bandar Seri Begawan	Singles
Bronze medal – third place	2001 Kuala Lumpur	Singles
Representing China
Asian Championships
Silver medal – second place	1990 Kuala Lumpur	Doubles

Jing Junhong, also stylized as Jing Jun Hong (Chinese: 井浚泓; pinyin: Jǐng Jùnhóng; born October 13, 1968), is a Chinese-born Singaporean former professional table tennis player. Born in Shanghai, she was a highly ranked player in China before she moved to Singapore with her husband, Singaporean table tennis player Loy Soo Han, whom she married in 1992. She represented Singapore in sporting events starting in the 1990s, and was naturalized as a Singaporean citizen in 1994. After retiring as a player, she served as deputy head coach, then as head coach, of the women's national table tennis team, before being reassigned to leading the country's table tennis youth development program in late 2015.

== Early life ==
Jing Junhong was born in Shanghai, China on 13 October 1968, the child of a teacher and an engineer. Jing was trained in table tennis in China after being spotted at the age of eight, and by 1988 she had become the nation's third ranked women's table tennis player. That year, she met Singaporean table tennis player Loy Soo Han, who was attending a long-term training program. Jing and Loy were married in 1992, and Jing moved to Singapore that year, with the intention of retiring from table tennis. She became a naturalized citizen of Singapore in 1994. In 1998, she had a son, Meng Huen (Darren), who as of 2012 was also training to represent Singapore in table tennis.

== Playing career ==
By 1992, Jing was representing Singapore at international table tennis competitions. Her first event representing Singapore was that year's Vietnam Golden Racket Championships, which she won. The following year, Jing was selected to represent Singapore at the 1993 World Table Tennis Championships in Gothenburg, Sweden. At the event, she beat then top ranked player and Olympic champion Deng Yaping of China. In 1995, Jing represented Singapore at the Commonwealth Table Tennis Championships, where she took second behind Hong Kong's Chai Po Wa, and at the 1995 Southeast Asian Games. At the Southeast Asian Games, she won the singles and mixed doubles events, and came in second in the women's doubles event.

Jing represented Singapore in the 1996 Summer Olympics in Atlanta, where she competed in the Women's singles event. She swept her group, winning all three of her matches (against Kim Hyang-Mi, Xu Jing, and Petra Cada), but exited in the round of 16 after losing to China's Qiao Hong. For her Olympic performance, one of the best to that point in Singapore's history, Jing was named 1997 Sportswoman of the Year. The following year, Jing again competed in the Commonwealth Table Tennis Championships, winning the single, double, and team events, and earning a second consecutive Sportswoman of the Year award. She continued collecting medals in the following years, taking a singles title at the 1997 Southeast Asian Games and two doubles and a team title at the 1999 Southeast Asian Games.

In the 2000 Summer Olympics, Jing competed in both the singles and doubles events, the latter alongside Li Jiawei. In the singles event, Jing again swept her group, beating Karen Li and Sofija Tepes. She then defeated Sun Jin, Lijuan Geng, and Mihaela Steff to reach the semifinals, where she was defeated by Li Ju. In the bronze medal game, she lost to Chen Jing. In the doubles event, Jing and Li started in the round of 16, where they were defeated by Eldijana Bentsen and Tamara Boroš of Croatia. Jing again won the Sportswoman of the Year award for her Olympic performance. Following the 2000 Olympics, Jing was ranked 12th in the world by the International Table Tennis Federation.

In between the 2000 and 2004 Olympic games, Jing won medals at the 2001 and 2003 Southeast Asian Games, and at the 2002 Commonwealth Games. At the 2004 Olympic Games, Jing again competed in both the singles and doubles events, reprising her partnership with Li Jiawei in the doubles. Jing and Li began the doubles event in the round of 16, where they were defeated by South Korean team Kim Kyung-Ah and Kim Bok Rae. In the singles event, Jing began in the second round, where she defeated Silvija Erdelji of Serbia, but was knocked out by Kim Hyon-Hui of North Korea in the third round. Jing retired as a player that year.

== Coaching career ==
Jing became the assistant coach of the Singapore women's table tennis team in 2009. She was on the coaching team in the 2012 Summer Olympics when Singapore won two bronze medals, an individual medal by Feng Tianwei and a team medal by Feng Tianwei, Wang Yuegu and Li Jiawei, Jing's former partner.

In 2013, Jing was promoted to head coach, and won the Singapore Table Tennis Association's Coach of the Year award in 2013 and 2014. Under Jing's leadership, the women's team won six gold medals at the 2014 Commonwealth Games, and Feng picked up victories at International Table Tennis Federation events in Japan, Australia, and the Philippines. The women's team also won three third-place medals at the 2014 Asian Games.

In November 2015, following a public dispute with player Yu Mengyu at the International Table Tennis Federation Polish Open and a request by Yu and Feng for a coaching change, Jing Junhong was replaced as the head coach of the women's team. Jing was instead put in charge of several of the Singapore Table Tennis Association's youth development programs, with oversight over both the programs and their coaches.
