= Svetlana Bakhtina =

Svetlana Bakhtina (Russian: Светлана Бахтина) may refer to the following notable people:

- Svetlana Bakhtina (gymnast) (born 1980), Russian gymnast
- Svetlana Bakhtina (table tennis) (born 1980), Russian table tennis player
