= Boucetta =

Boucetta (Arabic: بوستة) is a surname. Notable people with the surname include:

- Fethi Boucetta (born 15 September 1963), Algerian citizen who was held in extrajudicial detention in Guantanamo Bay detention camps
- Leila Boucetta (born 12 December 1986), Algerian table tennis player
- M'hamed Boucetta (23 December 1925 – 17 February 2017), Moroccan politician and lawyer
- Mounia Boucetta (born 24 March 1967), Moroccan engineer and politician
