= Tatyana Logatskaya =

Belarusian table tennis player

Tatiana Logatskaya
Personal information
- Nationality: Belarusian
- Born: 18 July 1977 (age 47); Minsk, Belarus

Sport
- Sport: Table tennis

Tatiana Logatskaya (born 18 July 1977) is a Belarusian table tennis player. She competed in the women's doubles event at the 2004 Summer Olympics.
