= Maria Mirou =

Greek table tennis player (born 1977)

Personal information
- Nationality: Greek
- Born: 13 May 1977 (age 48) Piraeus, Greece

Sport
- Sport: Table tennis

Maria Mirou (born 13 May 1977) is a Greek table tennis player. She competed in the women's doubles event at the 2004 Summer Olympics.
