= Orel Oral =

Turkish swimmer (born 1979)

Personal information
- Full name: Uğur Orel Oral
- National team: Turkey
- Born: 26 September 1979 (age 46) Istanbul, Turkey
- Height: 1.80 m (5 ft 11 in)
- Weight: 67 kg (148 lb)

Sport
- Sport: Swimming
- Strokes: Individual medley
- Club: Fenerbahçe Spor Kulübü
- College team: University of Indianapolis (U.S.)
- Coach: Gary Kinkead (U.S.)

Uğur Orel Oral (born September 26, 1979) is a Turkish former swimmer, who specialized in individual medley events. He is a two-time Olympian (2000 and 2004), and a seven-time NCAA Division II national champion while studying in the United States. He is also named Swimmer of the Year in Turkey in 2003 and 2004, and holds 15 Turkish records in the same stroke. Oral is a former varsity swimmer for the Indianapolis Greyhounds at the University of Indianapolis under his head coach Gary Kinkead (2000–2004).

Oral made his first Turkish team at the 2000 Summer Olympics in Sydney. Swimming in heat two of the men's 200 m individual medley, he picked up a seventh seed and forty-eighth overall by 0.51 of a second behind Hong Kong's Alex Fong in 2:09.51.

At the 2004 Summer Olympics in Athens, Oral qualified again for the 200 m individual medley, by eclipsing a FINA B-standard entry time of 2:07.09 from the USA National Championships in College Park, Maryland. He challenged six other swimmers on the second heat, including Olympic veteran Oleg Pukhnatiy of Uzbekistan. He rounded out the field to last place by 0.12 of a second behind Chinese Taipei's Wu Nien-pin in 2:08.84. Oral failed to advance into the semifinals, as he matched a forty-fifth place tie with Puerto Rico's Jorge Oliver in the preliminaries.

Two months after his second Olympics, Oral posted his lifetime best and a Turkish record of 55.31 to pull off an eighth-place finish in the 100 m individual medley at the 2004 FINA World Short Course Championships in Indianapolis, Indiana.

In 2012, Oral was inducted into the University of Indianapolis Hall of Fame for his enormous success and full-time dedication in collegiate swimming. He is currently working as an assistant coach for the same swimming team.
