= Swimming at the 2004 Summer Olympics – Men's 200 metre individual medley =

Men's 200 metre individual medley at the Games of the XXVIII Olympiad
- Venue: Olympic Aquatic Centre
- Date: August 18, 2004 (heats & semifinals); August 19, 2004 (final)
- Competitors: 50 from 42 nations
- Winning time: 1:57.14 OR

Medalists
1st place, gold medalist(s)		Michael Phelps	United States
2nd place, silver medalist(s)		Ryan Lochte	United States
3rd place, bronze medalist(s)		George Bovell	Trinidad and Tobago

The men's 200 metre individual medley event at the 2004 Olympic Games was contested at the Olympic Aquatic Centre of the Athens Olympic Sports Complex in Athens, Greece on August 18 and 19.

U.S. swimmer Michael Phelps blasted his own Olympic record of 1:57.14 to claim his fourth career gold medal in swimming. Coming from fifth place in the final turn, Phelps' teammate Ryan Lochte powered home with a silver in 1:58.78. Meanwhile, George Bovell held off Hungary's László Cseh by four hundredths of a second (0.04) to give Trinidad and Tobago its first ever swimming medal, in a Commonwealth record of 1:58.80.

Earlier in the semifinals, Phelps posted a new Olympic record of 1:58.52, previously set by Italian swimmer and defending Olympic champion Massimiliano Rosolino in Sydney four years earlier. Rosolino, along with his teammate Alessio Boggiatto, failed to reach the top 8 final with a tenth and eleventh-place effort. Tunisia's Oussama Mellouli, who placed fifth in the 400 m individual medley, also missed the cut, but set an African record of 2:01.11.

== Records ==
Prior to this competition, the existing world and Olympic records were as follows.

World record	Michael Phelps (USA)	1:55.94	College Park, United States	9 August 2003
Olympic record	Massimiliano Rosolino (ITA)	1:58.98	Sydney, Australia	21 September 2000

The following new world and Olympic records were set during this competition.

Date	Event	Name	Nationality	Time	Record
August 18	Semifinal 1	Michael Phelps	United States	1:58.52	OR
August 19	Final	Michael Phelps	United States	1:57.14	OR

== Results ==
=== Heats ===
Rank	Heat	Lane	Name	Nationality	Time	Notes
1	6	3	László Cseh	Hungary	1:59.50	Q
2	7	4	Michael Phelps	United States	2:00.01	Q
3	5	4	George Bovell	Trinidad and Tobago	2:00.65	Q
4	7	3	Jiro Miki	Japan	2:00.93	Q
5	7	5	Thiago Pereira	Brazil	2:01.12	Q
6	6	6	Alessio Boggiatto	Italy	2:01.30	Q
7	6	8	Dean Kent	New Zealand	2:01.31	Q
8	6	7	Vytautas Janušaitis	Lithuania	2:01.32	Q
9	7	6	Takahiro Mori	Japan	2:01.33	Q
10	6	4	Ryan Lochte	United States	2:01.41	Q
11	6	5	Massimiliano Rosolino	Italy	2:01.56	Q
12	7	2	Robin Francis	Great Britain	2:01.57	Q
13	6	2	Adrian Turner	Great Britain	2:01.73	Q
14	7	7	Tamás Kerékjártó	Hungary	2:01.75	Q
15	5	2	Oussama Mellouli	Tunisia	2:01.94	Q, AF
16	4	4	Ioannis Kokkodis	Greece	2:02.11	Q
17	7	1	Adam Lucas	Australia	2:02.12	
18	4	3	Mihail Alexandrov	Bulgaria	2:02.39	
19	6	1	Zhao Tao	China	2:02.41	
20	5	5	Jani Sievinen	Finland	2:02.79	
21	5	7	Christian Keller	Germany	2:02.93	
22	4	5	Sergiy Sergeyev	Ukraine	2:03.26	
23	4	8	Bradley Ally	Barbados	2:03.29	
24	5	8	Wu Peng	China	2:03.60	
25	4	7	Guntars Deičmans	Latvia	2:03.68	
26	5	1	Diogo Yabe	Brazil	2:03.86	
27	5	3	Justin Norris	Australia	2:03.87	
28	5	6	Brian Johns	Canada	2:03.95	
29	7	8	Alexei Zatsepine	Russia	2:04.11	
30	4	6	Jeremy Knowles	Bahamas	2:04.22	
31	3	6	Jacob Carstensen	Denmark	2:04.80	
32	3	3	Kim Bang-hyun	South Korea	2:05.06	
33	3	2	Miguel Molina	Philippines	2:05.28	
34	3	4	Krešimir Čač	Croatia	2:05.33	
35	2	4	Raouf Benabid	Algeria	2:06.34	
36	2	6	Hocine Haciane	Andorra	2:06.48	
37	4	1	Darian Townsend	South Africa	2:07.04	
38	2	3	Aleksandar Miladinovski	Macedonia	2:07.39	
39	3	5	Andrei Zaharov	Moldova	2:07.40	
40	3	1	Albert Christiadi Sutanto	Indonesia	2:07.55	
41	2	1	Andrew Mackay	Cayman Islands	2:07.65	
42	2	2	Oleg Pukhnatiy	Uzbekistan	2:08.24	
43	3	7	Gary Tan	Singapore	2:08.44	
44	2	7	Wu Nien-pin	Chinese Taipei	2:08.72	
45	1	4	Jorge Oliver	Puerto Rico	2:08.84	
45	2	5	Orel Oral	Turkey	2:08.84	
47	3	8	Malick Fall	Senegal	2:12.13	
48	1	3	Georgios Dimitriadis	Cyprus	2:12.27	
	1	5	Yevgeniy Ryzhkov	Kazakhstan	DSQ	
	4	2	Peter Mankoč	Slovenia	DNS	

=== Semifinals ===
==== Semifinal 1 ====
Rank	Lane	Name	Nationality	Time	Notes
1	4	Michael Phelps	United States	1:58.52	Q, OR
2	2	Ryan Lochte	United States	1:59.58	Q
3	6	Vytautas Janušaitis	Lithuania	2:00.57	Q, NR
4	5	Jiro Miki	Japan	2:01.09	Q
5	3	Alessio Boggiatto	Italy	2:01.27	
6	8	Ioannis Kokkodis	Greece	2:01.57	
7	1	Tamás Kerékjártó	Hungary	2:01.89	
8	7	Robin Francis	Great Britain	2:03.85	

==== Semifinal 2 ====
Rank	Lane	Name	Nationality	Time	Notes
1	4	László Cseh	Hungary	1:59.65	Q
2	3	Thiago Pereira	Brazil	2:00.07	Q
3	5	George Bovell	Trinidad and Tobago	2:00.31	Q
4	2	Takahiro Mori	Japan	2:00.57	Q
5	8	Oussama Mellouli	Tunisia	2:01.11	AF
6	7	Massimiliano Rosolino	Italy	2:01.29	
7	6	Dean Kent	New Zealand	2:01.94	
8	1	Adrian Turner	Great Britain	2:02.86	

=== Final ===
Rank	Lane	Name	Nationality	Time	Notes
1st place, gold medalist(s)	4	Michael Phelps	United States	1:57.14	OR
2nd place, silver medalist(s)	5	Ryan Lochte	United States	1:58.78	
3rd place, bronze medalist(s)	2	George Bovell	Trinidad and Tobago	1:58.80	NR
4	3	László Cseh	Hungary	1:58.84	
5	6	Thiago Pereira	Brazil	2:00.11	
6	1	Takahiro Mori	Japan	2:00.60	
7	7	Vytautas Janušaitis	Lithuania	2:01.28	
8	8	Jiro Miki	Japan	2:02.16	
