= Jorge Oliver =

Puerto Rican swimmer (born 1981)

Personal information
- Full name: Jorge Manuel Oliver
- National team: Puerto Rico
- Born: 23 January 1981 (age 45) Miami, Florida, U.S.
- Height: 1.81 m (5 ft 11 1/2 in)
- Weight: 77 kg (170 lb)

Sport
- Sport: Swimming
- Strokes: Individual medley
- College team: Georgia Institute of Technology (U.S.)

Jorge Manuel Oliver (born January 23, 1981) is a Puerto Rican former swimmer, who specialized in individual medley events. As a first-born American, Oliver holds a dual citizenship, which made him eligible to compete for Puerto Rico at the Olympics.

Oliver attended Episcopal School of Jacksonville, where he earned state and district championship titles in the 100 m freestyle (1997 and 1998). While playing for the Georgia Tech Yellow Jackets in his college years, he made six top-10 lists in the school's swimming records. In 2003, Oliver graduated from the Georgia Institute of Technology in Atlanta, with a bachelor's degree in chemical engineering.

As a member of the Puerto Rican team, Oliver qualified for the men's 200 m individual medley at the 2004 Summer Olympics in Athens, by clearing a FINA B-standard entry time of 2:08.23 from the Counsilman Classic in Indianapolis, Indiana. He posted a time of 2:08.84 to lead the first heat against Cyprus' Georgios Diamantidis and Kazakhstan's Yevgeniy Ryzhkov, who was disqualified for a false start. Oliver failed to advance into the semifinals, as he shared a forty-fifth place tie with Turkey's Orel Oral in the preliminaries.

Shortly after his only Olympic appearance, Oliver worked as a volunteer assistant coach for the Georgia Tech Yellow Jackets, and eventually, for his alma mater Episcopal School of Jacksonville.
