= Tvin Carole Moumjoghlian =

Lebanese table tennis player

Personal information
- Nationality: Lebanon
- Born: July 21, 1989 (age 37)
- Height: 1.72 m (5 ft 7 1/2 in)
- Weight: 56 kg (123 lb)

Sport
- Sport: Table tennis
- Club: Homenetmen Beirut, Lebanon
- Playing style: Shakehand, Offensive

Tvin Carole Moumjoghlian (born July 21, 1989) is a Lebanese table tennis player playing for Homenetmen Beirut. With her win at the West Asia Women's Qualification Tournament, she qualified for the London 2012 Olympic Games.

Born in Beirut, she began playing table tennis at age 9, following into her father's footsteps, Raffi Moumjoghlian, who is a former Lebanese table tennis champion. She reached the second round at the 2010 Asian Games in Guangzhou, China (losing to Olympic medalist Park Mi-Young) and headed the Lebanese team to the women's bronze medal at the 2011 Pan Arab Games.

Moumjoghlian holds a bachelor's degree in Economics from the American University of Beirut.
