= Mária Fazekas =

Hungarian table tennis player

Personal information
- Nationality: Hungarian
- Born: 2 August 1975 (age 49); Budapest, Hungary

Sport
- Sport: Table tennis

Mária Fazekas (born 2 August 1975) is a Hungarian table tennis player. She competed in the women's singles event at the 2004 Summer Olympics.
