= Svetlana Ganina =

Russian table tennis player

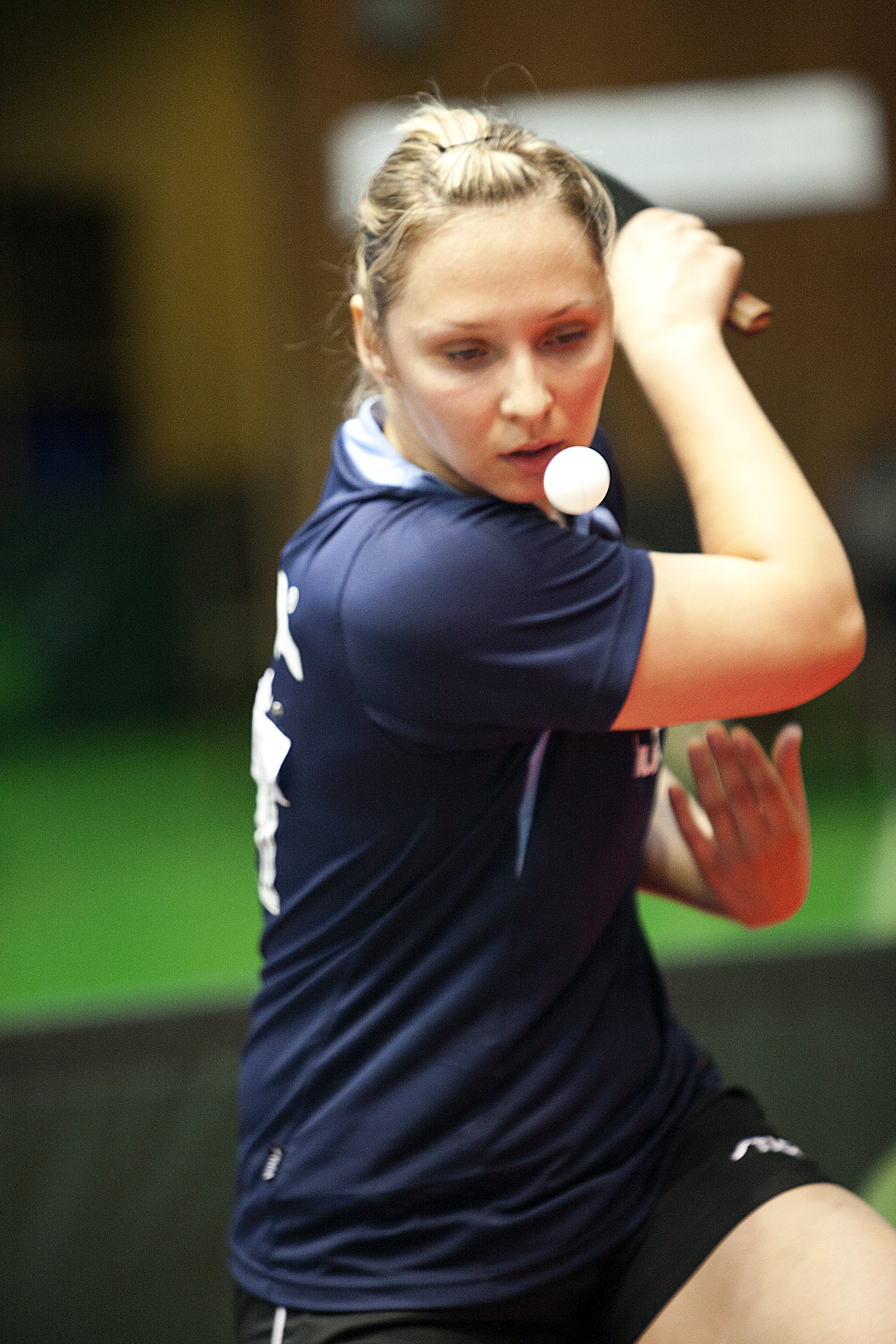

Personal information
- Full name: GANINA Svetlana
- Nationality: Soviet Union Russia
- Born: 11.07.1978 Nizhny Novgorod
- Height: 1.72 m (5 ft 8 in)
- Weight: 65 kg (143 lb)

Sport
- Sport: Table tennis
- Playing style: defensive
Medal record
Women's table tennis
Representing Russia
European Championships
Gold medal – first place	2007 Belgrade	Doubles
Silver medal – second place	2007 Belgrade	Team
Bronze medal – third place	2002 Zagreb	Doubles
Bronze medal – third place	2003 Courmayeur	Doubles
Bronze medal – third place	2005 Aarhus	Doubles

Svetlana Ganina (born 11 July 1978) is a Russian table tennis player. Since 2002 she won several medals in double and team events in the Table Tennis European Championships.

She was qualified for the 2008 Summer Olympics, scheduled to play in the first round of the singles competition, but she did not actually play. She competed in both singles and doubles in 2004.

She plays in a defensive style, with occasional attacking causing much trouble for her opponents. She uses long pimples on the backhand, though she frequently anticipates the placement of her opponent and flips her racket accordingly. She has won against many top players in the world, including Fukuhara Ai and Tamara Boros in the 2006 World Team Championships, and Tie Yana in a 2007 Pro Tour event.

== See also ==
- List of table tennis players
