= Oksana Fadeyeva =

Russian table tennis player

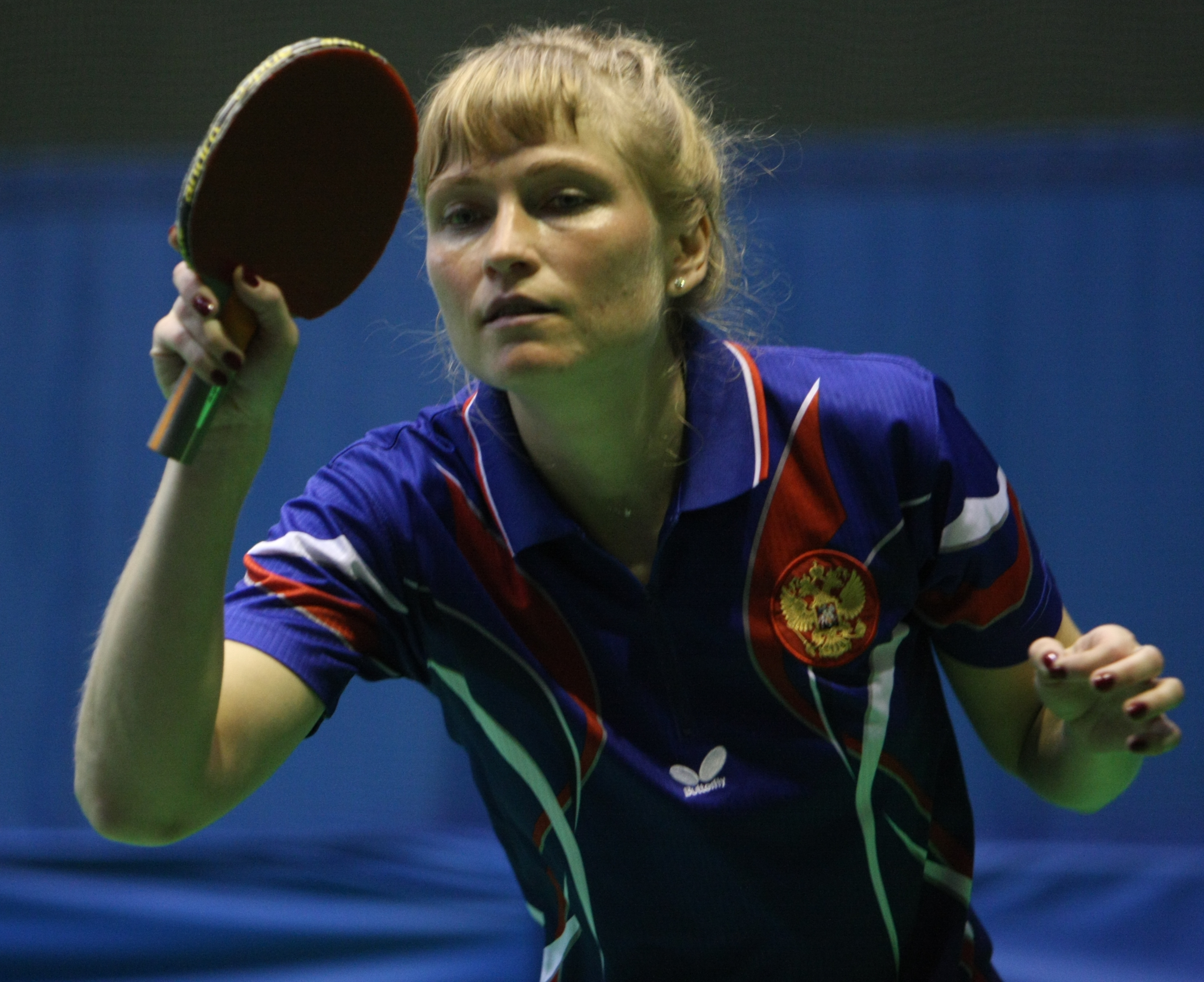

Personal information
- Full name: Fadeeva-Kusch Oxana
- Nationality: Soviet Union Russia

Sport
- Sport: Table tennis
Medal record
Women's table tennis
Representing Russia
European Championships
Gold medal – first place	1994 Birmingham	Team
Bronze medal – third place	2000 Bremen	Team
Silver medal – second place	2007 Belgrade	Team
Silver medal – second place	2007 Belgrade	Mixed Doubles
Bronze medal – third place	2008 Saint-Petersburg	Doubles
Bronze medal – third place	2009 Stuttgart	Doubles
Gold medal – first place	2010 Ostrava	Doubles
Gold medal – first place	2011 Gdansk-Sopot	Doubles

Oksana Fadeyeva (née Kushch; born 16 March 1975) is a Russian table tennis player.

She competed at the 2008 Summer Olympics, reaching the first round of the singles competition. She competed in both singles and doubles in 2004.

== See also ==
- List of table tennis players
