= Aya Umemura =

Japanese table tennis player

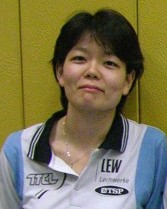

Personal information
- Nationality: Japanese
- Born: 4 December 1976 (age 48); Tomakomai, Hokkaido, Japan

Sport
- Sport: Table tennis

Aya Umemura (梅村 礼, Umemura Aya; born 4 December 1976) is a Japanese table tennis player and coach. She was born in Tomakomai, Hokkaido. She competed in women's singles and women's doubles at the 2004 Summer Olympics in Athens.
