= Yun Ji-hye (table tennis) =

South Korean table tennis player

Personal information
- Nationality: South Korean
- Born: 12 February 1983 (age 42); Seoul, South Korea
- Spouse: Lee Won-hee (m. 2018)

Sport
- Sport: Table tennis

Yun Ji-hye (born 12 February 1983) is a South Korean table tennis player. She competed in the women's singles event at the 2004 Summer Olympics.

She married South Korean judo champion Lee Won-hee in 2018 and have a daughter together.
