= Whitney Ping =

American table tennis player

Personal information
- Born: October 23, 1986 (age 39) Portland, Oregon, United States

Sport
- Sport: Table tennis

Whitney Ping (born October 23, 1986) is an American table tennis player. She competed in the women's doubles event at the 2004 Summer Olympics.
