= Nafaa Benami =

Algerian weightlifter

Personal information
- Nationality: Algerian
- Born: 8 November 1974 (age 50)

Sport
- Sport: Weightlifting

Nafaa Benami (born 8 November 1974) is an Algerian weightlifter. He competed in the men's bantamweight event at the 2004 Summer Olympics.
