= Nassim Islam Bernaoui =

Algerian fencer (born 1977)

Personal information
- Nationality: Algerian
- Born: 5 April 1977 (age 49)

Sport
- Country: Algeria
- Sport: Fencing
- Now coaching: National team of Algeria

Nassim Islam Al Bernaoui (born 5 April 1977) is an Algerian fencer. He competed in the individual and team sabre events at the 2004 Summer Olympics, and lost all four of his bouts.
