= Arkhontoula Volakaki =

Greek table tennis player (born 1979)

Archontia Volakaki
Personal information
- Nationality: Greek
- Born: 28 August 1979 (age 45); Chania

Sport
- Sport: Table tennis

Archontia Volakaki (born 28 July 1979) is a Greek table tennis player. She competed in the women's singles event at the 2004 Summer Olympics.
