= Safa Saidani =

Tunisian table tennis player (born 1990)

Safa Saidani (born 26 May 1990) is a Tunisian table tennis player. She competed at the 2016 Summer Olympics in the women's singles event, in which she was eliminated in the preliminary round by Dina Meshref.
