= Reda Benchehima =

Algerian fencer

Personal information
- Born: 15 June 1978 (age 48)

Sport
- Sport: Fencing

Reda Benchehima (born 15 June 1978) is an Algerian fencer. He competed in the individual and team sabre events at the 2004 Summer Olympics, and lost all four of his bouts.
