= Raouf Benabid =

Algerian swimmer

Personal information
- Full name: Raouf Benabid
- National team: Algeria
- Born: 3 August 1985 (age 40)
- Height: 1.78 m (5 ft 10 in)
- Weight: 82 kg (181 lb)

Sport
- Sport: Swimming
- Strokes: Individual medley

Raouf Benabid (Arabic: رؤوف بن عبيد; born August 3, 1985) is an Algerian former swimmer, who specialized in individual medley events. Benabid qualified for the men's 200 m individual medley at the 2004 Summer Olympics in Athens, by clearing a FINA B-standard entry time of 2:07.04 from the EDF Swimming Open in Paris. He edged out Andorra's Hocine Haciane to lead the second heat by 0.14 of a second in 2:06.34. Benabid failed to advance into the semifinals, as he placed thirty-fifth overall in the preliminaries.
