= Alena Vachovcová =

Czech table tennis player

Personal information
- Nationality: Czech
- Born: 24 January 1974 (age 51); Stod, Czechoslovakia

Sport
- Sport: Table tennis

Alena Vachovcová (born 24 January 1974) is a Czech former table tennis player. She competed in the women's doubles event at the 2004 Summer Olympics.
