= Zhang Yining =

Chinese table tennis player

Personal information
- Full name: Zhang Yining
- Born: 5 October 1981 (age 44) Beijing, China
- Height: 168 cm (5 ft 6 in)
- Weight: 54 kg (119 lb)

Sport
- Sport: Table tennis
- Playing style: Shake hands grip
- Highest ranking: 1
Medal record
Women's table tennis
Representing China
Event	1st	2nd	3rd
Olympic Games	4	0	0
World Championships	10	2	4
World Cup	5	2	1
Total	19	4	5
Olympics Games
Gold medal – first place	2004 Athens	Singles
Gold medal – first place	2004 Athens	Doubles
Gold medal – first place	2008 Beijing	Singles
Gold medal – first place	2008 Beijing	Team
World Championships
Gold medal – first place	2000 Kuala Lumpur	Team
Gold medal – first place	2001 Osaka	Team
Gold medal – first place	2003 Paris	Doubles
Gold medal – first place	2004 Doha	Team
Gold medal – first place	2005 Shanghai	Singles
Gold medal – first place	2005 Shanghai	Doubles
Gold medal – first place	2006 Bremen	Team
Gold medal – first place	2007 Zagreb	Doubles
Gold medal – first place	2008 Guangzhou	Team
Gold medal – first place	2009 Yokohama	Singles
Silver medal – second place	1999 Eindhoven	Singles
Silver medal – second place	2003 Paris	Singles
Bronze medal – third place	1999 Eindhoven	Doubles
Bronze medal – third place	2001 Osaka	Singles
Bronze medal – third place	2001 Osaka	Doubles
Bronze medal – third place	2007 Zagreb	Singles
World Cup
Gold medal – first place	2001 Wuhu	Singles
Gold medal – first place	2002 Singapore	Singles
Gold medal – first place	2004 Hangzhou	Singles
Gold medal – first place	2005 Guangzhou	Singles
Gold medal – first place	2007 Magdeburg	Team
Silver medal – second place	2006 Urumqi	Singles
Silver medal – second place	2007 Chengdu	Singles
Bronze medal – third place	2003 Hong Kong	Singles
Asian Games
Gold medal – first place	1998 Bangkok	Team
Gold medal – first place	2002 Busan	Singles
Silver medal – second place	2002 Busan	Doubles
Silver medal – second place	2002 Busan	Team

Zhang Yining (Chinese: 张怡宁; pinyin: Zhāng Yíníng; born 5 October 1981) is a Chinese table tennis player who retired in 2009. She is considered one of the greatest female players in the sport's history. In terms of achievements, she is one of the most successful female table tennis players (alongside Ding Ning, Deng Yaping, Wang Nan, Li Xiaoxia) having won the gold medal in each of the Table Tennis World Cup, the Table Tennis World Championships, and the Olympic Games. She is also the first player overall, and the first female, to have completed a Double Grand Slam.

== History ==
Zhang Yining held the ITTF #1 ranking continuously from 2003 to 2009, except two months in 2008, remaining as a dominant figure in women's table tennis, with four Olympic gold medals, ten World Championships, and four World Cup wins. During the 2008 Beijing Olympics, she was often referred to by commentators as "The Yellow Beast", denoting her dominance in the sport. She uses a specially made Zhang Yining ZLC for her blade made by butterfly, and tenergy 05 for forehand and tenergy 64 for her backhand.

Zhang is a graduate from Beijing Shichahai Sports School, where Li Jiawei of Singapore studied as well.

Zhang was married in October 2009 and has not been present in table tennis tournaments since then. She announced her retirement from international play in 2011 and she went to the United States to study at the University of Wisconsin–Madison and learn to better speak English. This makes her one of few players to retire whilst holding both the World and Olympic titles for singles and team event in table tennis. Zhang also said she would like to introduce to Americans the sport of table tennis.

Since 2010, Zhang serves as the assistant president of the China Table Tennis College in Shanghai.

== Successes ==
- 45th World Table Tennis Championships (1999) Women's Single Silver
- 45th World Table Tennis Championships (2000) Women's Team Gold
- 5th ITTF Pro Tour Grand Finals (2000) Women's Single Gold
- 5th Table Tennis World Cup (2001) Women's Single Gold
- 46th World Table Tennis Championships (2001) Women's Team Gold
- 6th Table Tennis World Cup (2002) Women's Single Gold
- 7th ITTF Pro Tour Grand Finals (2002) Women's Single Gold
- 47th World Table Tennis Championships (2003) Women's Single Silver, women's Double Gold
- 47th World Table Tennis Championships (2004) Women's Team Gold
- Games of the 28th Olympiad (2004) Table Tennis Women's Single Gold, women's Double Gold
- 8th Table Tennis World Cup (2004) Women's Single Gold
- 48th World Table Tennis Championships (2005) Women's Single Gold, women's Double Gold
- 10thNational Games of China (2005) Women's Team Gold, women's Single Gold
- 9th Table Tennis World Cup (2005) Women's Single Gold
- 10th ITTF Pro Tour Grand Finals (2005) Women's Single Gold
- 48th World Table Tennis Championships (2006) Women's Team Gold
- 11th ITTF Pro Tour Grand Finals (2006) Women's Single Gold
- 49th World Table Tennis Championships (2007) Women's Double Gold
- 11th Table Tennis World Cup (2007) Women's Team Gold
- 49th World Table Tennis Championships (2008) Women's Team Gold
- Games of the 29th Olympiad (2008) Table Tennis Women's Single Gold, women's Team Gold
- 50th World Table Tennis Championships (2009) Women's Single Gold

== Olympic record ==
=== 2008 Summer Olympics Women's Table Tennis Singles results ===
Zhang participated in the 2008 Summer Olympics in Beijing, winning gold in both the women's singles and women's team competition. Zhang successfully defended her singles Olympic gold medal, defeating compatriot Wang Nan in the finals 8-11, 13–11, 11–8, 11–8, 11–3.

She was also the women's doubles gold medal winner at the 2004 Summer Olympics.

The following table shows the scores of the women's singles table tennis matches that Zhang Yining played during the Beijing 2008 Olympic Games:

Round	Result	Opponent's country	Opponent	Score	By match				
1st	Bye								
2nd	Bye								
3rd	W	Belarus	Victoria Pavlovich	4-0	11-7	11-2	11-7	11-5	
4th	W	Japan	Fukuhara Ai	4-1	11-5	11-2	11-5	9-11	11-8
Quarters	W	Singapore	Feng Tianwei	4-1	13-11	12-14	14-12	12-10	13-11
Semis	W	Singapore	Li Jia Wei	4-1	9-11	11-8	12-10	11-8	11-5
Finals	W	China	Wang Nan	4-1	8-11	13-11	11-8	11-8	11-3

Click here to see further details regarding the 2008 Summer Olympics Table Tennis competition results.

=== 2008 Summer Olympics opening ceremony ===
At the opening ceremony of the 2008 Summer Olympics in Beijing, Zhang took the Olympic Oath on behalf of all competitors at the Games.

== See also ==
- List of multiple Olympic gold medalists
