= Svetlana Bakhtina (table tennis) =

Russian table tennis player

Personal information
- Born: 24 June 1976 (age 50) Voronezh, Russia
- Education: Lesgaft National State University of Physical Education, Sport and Health

Sport
- Sport: Table tennis
- Coached by: Sofia Dmitrievna Semenova
- Retired: 2003
Medal record
Representing Russia
European Table Tennis Championships
Gold medal – first place	1994 Birmingham	Team

Svetlana Anatolievna Bakhtina (later Mayorova, Russian: Светлана Анатольевна Бахтина (Майорова), born 24 June 1976) is a retired Russian table tennis player. She won the individual national title in 1994, 1998 and 1999, and was a member of the Russian national team from 1993 to 2000. She won a team gold medal at the 1994 European Table Tennis Championships.

Bakhtina was born in Voronezh, and moved to Saint Petersburg when she was 12. She retired in 2003, but continued her table tennis career as a playing coach of the Spanish team Suris Calella. She is married to a competitive table tennis player. She has two brothers and one daughter.
