= Souad Nechab =

Algerian table tennis player

Personal information
- Nationality: Algerian
- Born: 25 December 1979 (age 45)

Sport
- Sport: Table tennis

Souad Nechab (born 25 December 1979) is an Algerian table tennis player. She competed in the women's doubles event at the 2004 Summer Olympics.
