= Wenling Tan Monfardini =

Italian table tennis player (born 1972)

Personal information
- Full name: Wenling Tan Monfardini
- Nationality: Italy
- Born: 28 October 1972 (age 53) Hunan, China

Sport
- Sport: Table tennis
Medal record
Women's table tennis
Representing Italy
European Championships
Gold medal – first place	2003 Courmayeur	Team
Silver medal – second place	2003 Courmayeur	Singles
Silver medal – second place	2008 Saint-Petersburg	Doubles
Silver medal – second place	2009 Stuttgart	Doubles
Bronze medal – third place	2005 Aarhus	Doubles
Bronze medal – third place	2007 Belgrade	Doubles
Bronze medal – third place	2008 Saint-Petersburg	Singles
Mediterranean Games
Gold medal – first place	2009 Pescara	Team

Wenling Tan Monfardini (born 28 October 1972) is a Chinese-born naturalised Italian professional table tennis player.

== Biography ==
Since 2003 she has won several medals in single, double, and team events at the Table Tennis European Championships.

She competed at the 2008 Summer Olympics and 2012 Summer Olympics, reaching the second round of the singles competition both times.

== See also ==
- Italy at the 2012 Summer Olympics
