= Leila Boucetta =

Algerian table tennis player (born 1986)

Personal information
- Nationality: Algerian
- Born: 12 December 1986 (age 39)

Sport
- Sport: Table tennis

Leila Boucetta (born 12 December 1986) is an Algerian table tennis player. She competed in the women's singles event at the 2004 Summer Olympics.
