= Marina Kravchenko =

Israeli table tennis player

Marina Kravchenko (Russian: Марина Кравченко, Hebrew: מרינה קרבצ'נקו; born May 19, 1975, in Ukraine) is a champion Israeli table tennis player. She is Jewish. She participated in the Olympics in 2004.

== See also ==
- List of select Jewish table tennis players
