= Kim Bok-rae =

South Korean table tennis player

Personal information
- Nationality: South Korean
- Born: 3 May 1977 (age 47)

Sport
- Sport: Table tennis

Kim Bok-rae (born 3 May 1977) is a South Korean table tennis player. She competed in women's doubles at the 2004 Summer Olympics in Athens, placing fourth.
