= Asma Menaifi =

Algerian table tennis player

Personal information
- Nationality: Algerian
- Born: 5 June 1986 (age 38)

Sport
- Sport: Table tennis

Asma Menaifi (born 5 June 1986) is an Algerian table tennis player. She competed in the women's singles event at the 2004 Summer Olympics.
