= Nesrine Ben Kahia =

Tunisian table tennis player

Personal information
- Full name: Nesrine Ben Kahia
- Nationality: Tunisian
- Born: 18 July 1986 (age 38); Bizerte, Tunisia

Sport
- Sport: Table tennis

Nesrine Ben Kahia (born 18 July 1986) is a Tunisian table tennis player. She competed in the women's singles event at the 2004 Summer Olympics.
