= Adriana Năstase-Simion-Zamfir =

Romanian table tennis player

Personal information
- Nationality: Romanian
- Born: 6 July 1972 (age 54) Bucharest, Romania

Sport
- Sport: Table tennis

Adriana Năstase-Simion-Zamfir (born 6 July 1972) is a Romanian table tennis player. She competed at the 1992 Summer Olympics, the 1996 Summer Olympics, and the 2004 Summer Olympics.
