= Olfa Guenni =

Tunisian table tennis player

Personal information
- Nationality: Tunisian
- Born: 6 January 1988 (age 37)

Sport
- Sport: Table tennis

Olfa Guenni (born 6 January 1988) is a Tunisian table tennis player. She competed in the women's singles event at the 2004 Summer Olympics.
