= Silvija Erdelji =

Serbian table tennis player (born 1979)

Medal record

Representing Serbia

European Championships
| Bronze medal – third place | 2003 Courmayeur | Singles |
| Bronze medal – third place | 2003 Courmayeur | Doubles |

Mediterranean Games
| Gold medal – first place | 2005 Almería | Doubles |

European Youth Olympic Festival
| Bronze medal – third place | 1991 Brussels | Singles |

European Youth Championships
| Gold medal – first place | 1996 Frydek-Mistek | Junior Mixed Doubles |

Silvija Erdelji (Serbian Cyrillic: Силвија Ердељи, Hungarian: Erdélyi Szilvia; May 28, 1979 in Senta) is a Serbian table tennis player.

She won 2 bronze medals, in singles and doubles, at the 2003 European Table Tennis Championship. Erdelji competed at the 2004 Summer Olympics in Athens, Greece. In 2005, she became Mediterranean doubles champion.

She was named as Serbia and Montenegro Sportswoman of The Year 2003. Erdelji is of Hungarian ethnicity.
