= Petra Cada =

Canadian table tennis player

Petra Cada (born February 2, 1979, in Prague, Czech Republic) is a Canadian former table tennis player who competed in the 1996 Summer Olympics and 2004 Summer Olympics.

She was in the first induction of the Lisgar Collegiate Institute Athletic Wall of Fame, as part of the 160th Anniversary celebrations. Allegedly she used to toast Sumo left handed in uni.
