= Table tennis at the 2000 Summer Olympics – Women's singles =

Table tennis at the Olympics

Table tennis – Women's singles at the Games of the XXVII Olympiad
- Venue: State Sports Centre
- Date: 17 to 24 September 2000
- Competitors: 64 from 33 nations

Medalists
1st place, gold medalist(s)		Wang Nan	China
2nd place, silver medalist(s)		Li Ju	China
3rd place, bronze medalist(s)		Chen Jing	Chinese Taipei

These are the results of the women's singles competition, one of two events for female competitors in table tennis at the 2000 Summer Olympics in Sydney.

Among 64 entries, 16 seeded players were allocated into the draw of knockout stage which started from the round of 32. The rest competed in groups of three players per group. Winners of each group advanced to the knockout stage.

== Seeds ==
1. Wang Nan (CHN) (champion, gold medalist)
2. Li Ju (CHN) (final, silver medalist)
3. Chen Jing (TPE) (semifinals, bronze medalist)
4. Sun Jin (CHN) (first round)
5. Ryu Ji-hae (KOR) (quarterfinals)
6. Qianhong Gotsch (GER) (quarterfinals)
7. Chire Koyama (JPN) (quarterfinals)
8. Jing Tian-Zörner (GER) (first round)
9. Tamara Boroš (CRO) (first round)
10. Mihaela Steff (ROU) (quarterfinals)
11. Ni Xialian (LUX) (second round)
12. Li Jiawei (SIN) (second round)
13. An Konishi (JPN) (second round)
14. Jie Schöpp (GER) (first round)
15. Krisztina Tóth (HUN) (second round)
16. Suk Eun-mi (KOR) (second round)

== Group stage ==
=== Group A ===
Rank	Athlete	W	L	GW	GL	PW	PL	CAN	AUS	THA
1	Geng Lijuan (CAN)	2	0	6	0	126	80	X	3–0	3–0
2	Shirley Zhou (AUS)	1	1	3	4	123	138	0–3	X	3–1
3	Nanthana Komwong (THA)	0	2	1	6	110	141	0–3	1–3	X

=== Group B ===
Rank	Athlete	W	L	GW	GL	PW	PL	HUN	USA	NGR
1	Csilla Bátorfi (HUN)	2	0	6	1	143	92	X	3–1	3–0
2	Jasna Fazlić-Reed (USA)	1	1	4	3	120	128	1–3	X	3–0
3	Bose Kaffo (NGR)	0	2	0	6	83	126	0–3	0–3	X

=== Group C ===
Rank	Athlete	W	L	GW	GL	PW	PL	KOR	CAN	USA
1	Lee Eun-Sil (KOR)	2	0	6	0	126	75	X	3–0	3–0
2	Xiao-Xiao Wang (CAN)	1	1	3	3	108	118	0–3	X	3–0
3	Tawny Banh (USA)	0	2	0	6	87	128	0–3	0–3	X

=== Group D ===
Rank	Athlete	W	L	GW	GL	PW	PL	USA	CRO	AUS
1	Gao Jun (USA)	2	0	6	0	126	73	X	3–0	3–0
2	Andrea Bakula (CRO)	1	1	3	5	140	160	0–3	X	3–2
3	Stella Zhou (AUS)	0	2	2	6	132	165	0–3	2–3	X

=== Group E ===
Rank	Athlete	W	L	GW	GL	PW	PL	TPE	HUN	TKM
1	Xu Jing (TPE)	2	0	6	0	126	77	X	3–0	3–0
2	Zita Molnár (HUN)	1	1	3	3	109	95	0–3	X	3–0
3	Aida Steshenko (TKM)	0	2	0	6	63	126	0–3	0–3	X

=== Group F ===
Rank	Athlete	W	L	GW	GL	PW	PL	JPN	AUS	NGR
1	Rinko Sakata (JPN)	2	0	6	2	164	130	X	3–0	3–2
2	Miao Miao (AUS)	1	1	3	3	116	122	0–3	X	3–0
3	Olufunke Oshonaike (NGR)	0	2	2	6	137	165	2–3	0–3	X

=== Group G ===
Rank	Athlete	W	L	GW	GL	PW	PL	SIN	NZL	CHI
1	Jing Junhong (SIN)	2	0	6	0	126	65	X	3–0	3–0
2	Karen Li (NZL)	1	1	3	3	97	103	0–3	X	3–0
3	Sofija Tepes (CHI)	0	2	0	6	71	126	0–3	0–3	X

=== Group H ===
Rank	Athlete	W	L	GW	GL	PW	PL	AUT	CRO	CUB
1	Liu Jia (AUT)	2	0	6	1	145	91	X	3–1	3–0
2	Eldijana Aganović (CRO)	1	1	4	3	120	112	1–3	X	3–0
3	Marisel Ramírez (CUB)	0	2	0	6	64	126	0–3	0–3	X

=== Group I ===
Rank	Athlete	W	L	GW	GL	PW	PL	NZL	LTU	CHI
1	Chunli Li (NZL)	2	0	6	1	144	79	X	3–1	3–0
2	Rūta Paškauskienė (LTU)	1	1	4	4	137	145	1–3	X	3–1
3	Berta Rodríguez (CHI)	0	2	1	6	88	145	0–3	1–3	X

=== Group J ===
Rank	Athlete	W	L	GW	GL	PW	PL	ROU	RUS	BRA
1	Otilia Badescu (ROU)	2	0	6	1	144	109	X	3–1	3–0
2	Oksana Fadeyeva (RUS)	1	1	4	4	149	140	1–3	X	3–1
3	Lígia Silva (BRA)	0	2	1	6	99	143	0–3	1–3	X

=== Group K ===
Rank	Athlete	W	L	GW	GL	PW	PL	TPE	UKR	VEN
1	Chen-Tong Fei-Ming (TPE)	2	0	6	0	131	80	X	3–0	3–0
2	Olena Kovtun (UKR)	1	1	3	3	101	95	0–3	X	3–0
3	Fabiola Ramos (VEN)	0	2	0	6	74	131	0–3	0–3	X

=== Group L ===
Rank	Athlete	W	L	GW	GL	PW	PL	FRA	BLR	IND
1	Anne Boileau (FRA)	2	0	6	0	127	80	X	3–0	3–0
2	Veronika Pavlovich (BLR)	1	1	3	3	113	111	0–3	X	3–0
3	Poulomi Ghatak (IND)	0	2	0	6	77	126	0–3	0–3	X

=== Group M ===
Rank	Athlete	W	L	GW	GL	PW	PL	RUS	HKG	EGY
1	Galina Melnik (RUS)	2	0	6	2	162	127	X	3–2	3–0
2	Wong Ching (HKG)	1	1	5	3	158	141	2–3	X	3–0
3	Shaimaa Abdul-Aziz (EGY)	0	2	0	6	74	126	0–3	0–3	X

=== Group N ===
Rank	Athlete	W	L	GW	GL	PW	PL	RUS	HKG	UGA
1	Irina Palina (RUS)	2	0	6	0	130	90	X	3–0	3–0
2	Song Ah Sim (HKG)	1	1	3	3	117	103	0–3	X	3–0
3	Mary Musoke (UGA)	0	2	0	6	72	126	0–3	0–3	X

=== Group O ===
Rank	Athlete	W	L	GW	GL	PW	PL	SWE	BLR	EGY
1	Åsa Svensson (SWE)	2	0	6	1	142	99	X	3–1	3–0
2	Viktoria Pavlovich (BLR)	1	1	4	3	133	111	1–3	X	3–0
3	Shahira El-Alfy (EGY)	0	2	0	6	61	126	0–3	0–3	X

=== Group P ===
Rank	Athlete	W	L	GW	GL	PW	PL	SWE	BLR	JOR
1	Marie Svensson (SWE)	2	0	6	2	156	111	X	3–2	3–0
2	Tatyana Kostromina (BLR)	1	1	5	3	142	129	2–3	X	3–0
3	Tatiana Al-Najar (JOR)	0	2	0	6	68	126	0–3	0–3	X

== Knockout stage ==
=== Finals ===
Gold medal match
1	Wang Nan (CHN)	21	12	19	21	21
2	Li Ju (CHN)	12	21	21	17	18

Bronze medal match
3	Chen Jing (TPE)	18	21	21	21
	Jing Junhong (SIN)	21	14	15	10

=== Top half ===
First round
1	Wang N (CHN)	21	21	21
C Li (NZL)	17	15	9
Liu J (AUT)	13	17	21	17
12	Li J (SIN)	21	21	18	21
14	J Schöpp (GER)	21	19	21	9	10
Chen-Tong F-m (TPE)	16	21	15	21	21
Lee E-s (KOR)	10	22	14
7	C Koyama (JPN)	21	24	21
6	Q Gotsch (GER)	21	21	21
R Sakata (JPN)	14	16	15
O Badescu (ROU)	21	18	21	10	21
16	Suk E-m (KOR)	19	21	15	21	23
15	K Tóth (HUN)	21	21	21
I Palina (RUS)	15	16	7
M Svensson (SWE)	23	6	20
3	Chen J (TPE)	25	21	22

Second round
1	Wang N (CHN)	18	21	19	23	21
12	Li J (SIN)	21	18	21	21	16
Chen-Tong F-m (TPE)	26	22	6	19	15
7	C Koyama (JPN)	24	20	21	21	21
6	Q Gotsch (GER)	17	21	19	21	21
16	Suk E-m (KOR)	21	17	21	17	19
15	K Tóth (HUN)	14	9	14
3	Chen J (TPE)	21	21	21

Quarterfinals
1	Wang N (CHN)	21	21	22
7	C Koyama (JPN)	19	8	20
6	Q Gotsch (GER)	21	21	13	10	17
3	Chen J (TPE)	17	19	21	21	21

Semifinals
1	Wang N (CHN)	12	22	21	21
3	Chen J (TPE)	21	20	17	15

=== Bottom half ===
First round
4	Sun J (CHN)	16	18	7
Jing J (SIN)	21	21	21
L Geng (CAN)	18	21	21	29	21
9	T Boroš (CRO)	21	19	23	27	14
10	M Steff (ROU)	21	21	21
A Boileau (FRA)	15	12	18
A Svensson (SWE)	21	21	18	19	21
8	J Tian-Zörner (GER)	18	13	21	21	18
5	Ryu J-h (KOR)	21	15	21	21
Gao J (USA)	17	21	15	10
Xu J (TPE)	15	12	15
13	A Konishi (JPN)	21	21	21
11	Ni X (LUX)	24	21	19	21	21
C Bátorfi (HUN)	22	10	21	23	14
G Melnik (RUS)	21	17	22	18	13
2	Li J (CHN)	14	21	20	21	21

Second round
Jing J (SIN)	16	25	13	22	23
L Geng (CAN)	21	23	21	20	21
10	M Steff (ROU)	13	21	18	21	21
A Svensson (SWE)	21	16	21	10	13
5	Ryu J-h (KOR)	21	22	15	17	22
13	A Konishi (JPN)	17	20	21	21	20
11	Ni X (LUX)	15	11	15
2	Li J (CHN)	21	21	21

Quarterfinals
Jing J (SIN)	22	21	19	22
10	M Steff (ROU)	20	12	21	20
5	Ryu J-h (KOR)	21	14	19	15
2	Li J (CHN)	12	21	21	21

Semifinals
Jing J (SIN)	21	13	12	19
2	Li J (CHN)	15	21	21	21

== Competitors ==
Athlete	Nation	Eliminated
Shirley Zhou	Australia	Groups
Nanthana Komwong	Thailand	Groups
Jasna Fazlić-Reed	United States	Groups
Bose Kaffo	Nigeria	Groups
Xiao-Xiao Wang	Canada	Groups
Tawny Banh	United States	Groups
Andrea Bakula	Croatia	Groups
Stella Zhou	Australia	Groups
Zita Molnár	Hungary	Groups
Aida Steshenko	Turkmenistan	Groups
Miao Miao	Australia	Groups
Olufunke Oshonaike	Nigeria	Groups
Karen Li	New Zealand	Groups
Sofija Tepes	Chile	Groups
Eldijana Aganović	Croatia	Groups
Marisel Ramírez	Cuba	Groups
Rüta Pašauskienė	Lithuania	Groups
Berta Rodríguez	Chile	Groups
Oksana Fadayeva	Russia	Groups
Lígia Silva	Brazil	Groups
Olena Kovtun	Ukraine	Groups
Fabiola Ramos	Venezuela	Groups
Veronika Pavlovich	Belarus	Groups
Poulomi Ghatak	India	Groups
Wong Ching	Hong Kong	Groups
Shaimaa Abdul-Aziz	Egypt	Groups
Song Ah Sim	Hong Kong	Groups
Mary Musoke	Uganda	Groups
Viktoria Pavlovich	Belarus	Groups
Shahira El-Alfy	Egypt	Groups
Tatyana Kostromina	Belarus	Groups
Tatiana Al-Najar	Jordan	Groups
Chunli Li	New Zealand	32
Liu Jia	Austria	32
Jie Schöpp	Germany	32
Lee Eun-Sil	South Korea	32
Rinko Sakata	Japan	32
Otilia Badescu	Romania	32
Irina Palina	Russia	32
Marie Svensson	Sweden	32
Sun Jin	China	32
Tamara Boroš	Croatia	32
Anne Boileau	France	32
Jing Tian-Zörner	Germany	32
Gao Jun	United States	32
Xu Jing	Chinese Taipei	32
Csila Bátorfi	Hungary	32
Galina Melnik	Russia	32
Li Jiawei	Singapore	16
Chen-Tong Fei-Ming	Chinese Taipei	16
Suk Eun-mi	South Korea	16
Krisztina Tóth	Hungary	16
Ni Xialian	Luxembourg	16
An Konishi	Japan	16
Asa Svensson	Sweden	16
Lijuan Geng	Canada	16
Chire Koyama	Japan	8
Qianhong Gotsch	Germany	8
Mihaela Steff	Romania	8
Ryu Ji-hae	South Korea	8
Jing Junhong	Singapore	4
Chen Jing	Chinese Taipei	3
Li Ju	China	2
Wang Nan	China	1
