= Turkmenistan at the 2000 Summer Olympics =

- IOC code: TKM
- NOC: National Olympic Committee of Turkmenistan

in Sydney
- Competitors: 8 (4 men and 4 women) in 6 sports
- Flag bearer: Chary Mamedov
- Medals: Gold 0 Silver 0 Bronze 0 Total 0

Summer Olympics appearances (overview)
- 1996; 2000; 2004; 2008; 2012; 2016; 2020; 2024

Other related appearances
- Russian Empire (1900–1912); Soviet Union (1952–1988); Unified Team (1992)

Turkmenistan was represented at the 2000 Summer Olympics in Sydney, New South Wales, Australia by the National Olympic Committee of Turkmenistan.

In total, eight athletes including four men and four women represented Turkmenistan in six different sports including athletics, judo, shooting, table tennis, weightlifting and wrestling.

== Competitors ==
In total, eight athletes represented Turkmenistan at the 2000 Summer Olympics in Sydney, New South Wales, Australia across six different sports.

Sport	Men	Women	Total
Athletics	1	1	2
Judo	0	2	2
Shooting	1	0	1
Table tennis	0	1	1
Weightlifting	1	0	1
Wrestling	1	–	1
Total	19	7	26

== Athletics ==
In total, two Turkmenistani athletes participated in the athletics events – Viktoriya Brigadnaya in the women's triple jump and Chary Mamedov in the men's discus throw.

The qualifying round for the women's triple jump took place on 22 September 2000. Brigadnaya contested qualifying group A. Her best jump of 13.96 m saw her ranked 13th overall – just 2 cm shy of a place in the final.

The qualifying round for the men's discus throw took place on 24 September 2000. Mamedov contested qualifying group A. He made no mark after posting fouls on his three attempts.

Athlete	Event	Qualification		Final	
Athlete	Event	Distance	Position	Distance	Position
Viktoriya Brigadnaya	Women's triple jump	13.96	13	did not advance	
Chary Mamedov	Men's discus throw	No Mark		did not advance	

== Judo ==
In total, two Turkmenistani athletes participated in the judo events – Galina Atayeva in the women's –48 kg category and Nasiba Surkiýewa in the women's –78 kg category.

The women's −48 kg category took place on 16 September 2000. Atayeva lost her first round match by yuko to Cha Hyon-hyang of South Korea. In the repechage, she lost by ippon to Sarah Nichilo-Rosso of France.

The women's −78 kg category took place on 21 September 2000. Surkiýewa lost her first round match by ippon to Tang Lin of China. In the repechage, she lost by ippon to Sambuugiin Dashdulam of Mongolia.

Athlete	Event	Round of 32	Round of 16	Quarterfinals	Semifinals	Final / BM	
Athlete	Event	Opposition Result	Opposition Result	Opposition Result	Opposition Result	Opposition Result	Rank
Galina Atayeva	Women's –48 kg	n/a	Hyon-hyang (KOR); L	did not advance			13T
Nasiba Surkiýewa	Women's –78 kg	n/a	Lin (CHN); L	did not advance			13T

== Shooting ==
In total, one Turkmenistani athlete participated in the shooting events – Igor Pirekeyev in the men's 50 m rifle prone.

The men's 50 m rifle prone took place on 21 September 2000. In the preliminary round, Pirekeyev scored 597 across the six rounds and was joint third. In the final, he scored a further 102.2 for a total score of 699.2 as he finished seventh.

Athlete	Event	Qualification		Final	
Athlete	Event	Points	Rank	Points	Rank
Igor Pirekeyev	50 m rifle prone	597	4	102.02	7

== Table tennis ==
In total, one Turkmenistani athlete participated in the table tennis events – Aida Steshenko in the women's singles.

The preliminary round of the women's singles took place from 17–19 September 2000. Steshenko contested group E against Zita Molnár of Hungary and Xu Jing of Chinese Taipei. She lost her first match against Molnár 21–8 21–10 21–14 and then lost her second match against Jing 21–11 21–9 21–11. She finished third in the group and did not advance.

Athlete	Event	Group round		Round of 16	Quarterfinals	Semifinals	Bronze medal	Final	
Athlete	Event	Opposition Result	Rank	Opposition Result	Opposition Result	Opposition Result	Opposition Result	Opposition Result	Rank
Aida Steshenko	Women's singles	Group E Jing (TPE); L 0 – 3 Zita Molnár (HUN); L 0 – 3	3	did not advance					

== Weightlifting ==
In total, one Turkmenistani athlete participated in the weightlifting events – Ümürbek Bazarbaýew in the men's −62 kg category.

The men's −62 kg category took place on 17 September 2000. Bazarbaýew lifted 125 kg in the snatch but made no valid lift in the clean and jerk and was classified as did not finish.

Athlete	Event	Snatch		Clean & Jerk		Total	Rank
Athlete	Event	Result	Rank	Result	Rank	Total	Rank
Ümürbek Bazarbaýew	Men's −62 kg	125	12	did not finish			

== Wrestling ==
In total, one Turkmenistani athlete participated in the wrestling events – Nepes Gukulow in the men's Greco-Roman −58 kg category.

The round one pools for the men's Greco-Roman −58 kg took place on 25 and 26 September 2000. Gukulow contested pool five against Brett Cash of Australia, Armen Nazaryan of Bulgaria and Makoto Sasamoto of Japan. Guklow lost his first match against Nazaryan before losing his second match against Sasamoto. He finished the pool with a victory against Cash as he finished third and did not advance.

Athlete	Event	Group round		Quarterfinals	Semifinals	Bronze medal	Final	
Athlete	Event	Opposition Result	Rank	Opposition Result	Opposition Result	Opposition Result	Opposition Result	Rank
Nepes Gukulow	−58 kg	Pool 5 Cash (AUS); W 10 – 0 Sasamoto (JPN); L 3 – 5 Nazaryan (BUL); L 1–4	3	did not advance				
