= 2000 Summer Olympics Parade of Nations =

During the Parade of Nations portion of the 2000 Summer Olympics opening ceremony, athletes from each country participating in the Olympics paraded in the arena, preceded by their flag. The flag was borne by a sportsperson from that country chosen either by the National Olympic Committee or by the athletes themselves to represent their country.

== Parade order ==
As the nation of the first modern Olympic Games, Greece entered the stadium first; whereas, the host nation of Australia marched last. Other countries entered in alphabetical order in the language of the host country (English), according with tradition and IOC guidelines.

Whilst most countries entered under their short names, a few entered under more formal or alternative names, mostly due to political and naming disputes. Macedonia entered as "Former Yugoslav Republic of Macedonia'" because of the naming dispute with Greece. The Republic of China (commonly known as Taiwan) entered with the compromised name and flag of "Chinese Taipei" under T so that they did not enter together with conflicting People's Republic of China (commonly known as China), which entered as the "People's Republic of China" under C. The Republic of the Congo entered as just "Congo" while the Democratic Republic of Congo entered with its full name. Iran, Micronesia, Moldova, Laos, Brunei and the United States all entered under their formal names, respectively "Islamic Republic of Iran", "Federated States of Micronesia", "Republic of Moldova", "Lao People's Democratic Republic", "Brunei Darussalam" and "United States of America".

A record of 199 nations entered the stadium with the exception of Afghanistan, a nation banned by the IOC in 1999 because of the extremist rule of the Taliban's oppression on women and its sports. The parade of nations also featured a unified entrance by the athletes of the North and South Korea, holding a specially designed unification flag bearing the name "Korea": a white background flag with a blue map of the Korean peninsula; however, the two teams competed separately. Four athletes from East Timor marched directly in the opening ceremonies as individual Olympic athletes before the host nation. Without the existence of the National Olympic Committee, they were allowed to compete under the Olympic flag.

Notable flag bearers in the opening ceremony featured the following athletes: windsurfer Nikolaos Kaklamanakis (Greece), Olympic beach volleyball champion Sandra Pires (Brazil), tennis player Nicolás Massú (Chile), heavyweight boxing champion Félix Savón (Cuba), long-distance runner Derartu Tulu (Ethiopia), sprint kayaker and five-time gold medalist Birgit Fischer (Germany), coxless pairs rower and double gold medalist Matthew Pinsent (Great Britain), show jumper Princess Haya (Jordan), discus thrower and 1992 Olympic champion Romas Ubartas (Lithuania), dressage rider Anky van Grunsven (Netherlands), middle-distance runner Vebjørn Rodal (Norway), two-time Greco-Roman wrestling champion Andrzej Wroński (Poland), five-time rowing champion Elisabeta Lipă (Romania), four-time Olympic handballer Andrey Lavrov (Russia), six-time Olympic water polo player Manuel Estiarte (Spain), and basketball players Carlton Myers (Italy) and Andrew Gaze (Australia).

== List ==
The following is a list of each country's announced flag bearer. The list is sorted by the order in which each nation appears in the parade of nations. The names are given in their official designations by the IOC.

Order	Nation	Flag bearer	Sport
1	Greece	Nikolaos Kaklamanakis	Sailing
2	Albania	Ilirjan Suli	Weightlifting
3	Algeria	Djabir Saïd-Guerni	Athletics
4	American Samoa	Lisa Misipeka	Athletics
5	Andorra	Antoni Bernadó	Athletics
6	Angola	Nádia Cruz	Swimming
7	Antigua and Barbuda	Heather Samuel	Athletics
8	Argentina	Carlos Espínola	Sailing
9	Armenia	Haykaz Galstyan	Wrestling
10	Aruba	Richard Rodriguez	Athletics
11	Austria	Wolfram Waibel Jr.	Shooting
12	Azerbaijan	Namig Abdullayev	Wrestling
13	Bahamas	Pauline Davis-Thompson	Athletics
14	Bahrain	Dawood Youssef	Swimming
15	Bangladesh	Sabrina Sultana	Shooting
16	Barbados	Andrea Blackett	Athletics
17	Belarus	Siarhei Lishtvan	Wrestling
18	Belgium	Ulla Werbrouck	Judo
19	Belize	Emma Wade	Athletics
20	Benin	Laure Kuetey	Athletics
21	Bermuda	Mary Jane Tumbridge	Equestrian
22	Bhutan	Jubzhang Jubzhang	Archery
23	Bolivia	Marco Condori	Athletics
24	Bosnia and Herzegovina	Elvir Krehmić	Athletics
25	Botswana	Gilbert Khunwane	Boxing
26	Brazil	Sandra Pires	Beach volleyball
27	British Virgin Islands	Keita Cline	Athletics
28	Brunei Darussalam	Haseri Asli	Athletics
29	Bulgaria	Ivo Yanakiev	Rowing
30	Burkina Faso	Sarah Tondé	Athletics
31	Burundi	Diane Nukuri	Athletics
32	Cambodia	To Rithya	Athletics
33	Cameroon	Cécile Ngambi	Athletics (non-participant)
34	Canada	Caroline Brunet	Canoeing
35	Cape Verde	Isménia do Frederico	Athletics
36	Cayman Islands	Kareem Streete-Thompson	Athletics
37	Central African Republic	Mickaël Conjungo	Athletics
38	Chad	Gana Abba Kimet	Athletics
39	Chile	Nicolás Massú	Tennis
40	People's Republic of China	Liu Yudong	Basketball
41	Colombia	María Isabel Urrutia	Weightlifting
42	Comoros	Shareef Mohammed	Official
43	Congo	Marien Michel Ngouabi	Swimming
44	Cook Islands	Turia Vogel	Sailing
45	Costa Rica	Karina Fernández	Triathlon
46	Côte d'Ivoire	Ibrahim Meité	Athletics
47	Croatia	Zoran Primorac	Table tennis
48	Cuba	Félix Savón	Boxing
49	Cyprus	Antonakis Andreou	Shooting
50	Czech Republic	Martin Doktor	Canoeing
51	Democratic Republic of the Congo	Mwenze Kalombo	Athletics
52	Denmark	Jesper Bank	Sailing
53	Djibouti	Djama Robleh	Athletics (non-participant)
54	Dominica	Marcia Daniel	Athletics
55	Dominican Republic	Wanda Rijo	Weightlifting
56	Ecuador	Martha Tenorio	Athletics
57	Egypt	Yahia Rashwan	Taekwondo
58	El Salvador	Eva Dimas	Weightlifting
59	Equatorial Guinea	Eric Moussambani	Swimming
60	Eritrea	Nebiat Habtemariam	Athletics
61	Estonia	Tõnu Tõniste	Sailing
62	Ethiopia	Derartu Tulu	Athletics
63	Fiji	Tony Philp	Sailing
64	Finland	Olli-Pekka Karjalainen	Athletics
65	Former Yugoslav Republic of Macedonia	Lazar Popovski	Canoeing
66	France	David Douillet	Judo
67	Gabon	Mélanie Engoang	Judo
68	Gambia	Adama Njie	Athletics
69	Georgia	Giorgi Asanidze	Weightlifting
70	Germany	Birgit Fischer	Canoeing
71	Ghana	Kennedy Osei	Athletics
72	Great Britain	Matthew Pinsent	Rowing
73	Grenada	Hazel-Ann Regis	Athletics
74	Guam	Melissa Lynn Fejeran	Weightlifting
75	Guatemala	Attila Solti	Shooting
76	Guinea	Joseph Loua	Athletics
77	Guinea-Bissau	Talata Embalo	Wrestling
78	Guyana	Aliann Pompey	Athletics
79	Haiti	Nadine Faustin-Parker	Athletics
80	Honduras	Alejandro Castellanos	Swimming
81	Hong Kong, China	Fenella Ng	Rowing
82	Hungary	Rita Kőbán	Canoeing
83	Iceland	Guðrún Arnardóttir	Athletics
84	India	Leander Paes	Tennis
85	Indonesia	Rexy Mainaky	Badminton
86	Islamic Republic of Iran	Amir Reza Khadem	Wrestling
87	Iraq	Bashar Mohammad Ali	Chef de mission
88	Ireland	Sonia O'Sullivan	Athletics
89	Israel	Rogel Nachum	Athletics
90	Italy	Carlton Myers	Basketball
91	Jamaica	Deon Hemmings	Athletics
92	Japan	Kosei Inoue	Judo
93	Jordan	Princess Haya	Equestrian
94	Kazakhstan	Yermakhan Ibraimov	Boxing
95	Kenya	Kennedy Ochieng	Athletics
96	Democratic People's Republic of Korea (PRK)	Pak Jung-chul	Official
96	Korea (KOR)	Chung Eun-soon	Basketball
97	Kuwait	Fawzi Al-Shammari	Athletics
98	Kyrgyzstan	Raatbek Sanatbayev	Wrestling
99	Lao People's Democratic Republic	Sisomphone Vongpharkdy	Athletics
100	Latvia	Voldemārs Lūsis	Athletics
101	Lebanon	Jean-Claude Rabbath	Athletics
102	Lesotho	Mokete Mokhosi	Taekwondo
103	Liberia	Kouty Mawenh	Athletics
104	Libyan Arab Jamahiriya	Nizar Naeeli	Taekwondo
105	Liechtenstein	Oliver Geissmann	Shooting
106	Lithuania	Romas Ubartas	Athletics
107	Luxembourg	Lara Heinz	Swimming
108	Madagascar	Joseph-Berlioz Randriamihaja	Athletics
109	Malawi	Francis Munthali	Athletics
110	Malaysia	Mirnawan Nawawi	Field hockey
111	Maldives	Naseer Ismail	Athletics
112	Mali	Brahima Guindo	Judo
113	Malta	Laurie Pace	Judo
114	Mauritania	Sidi Mohamed Ould Bidjel	Athletics
115	Mauritius	Michael Macaque	Boxing
116	Mexico	Fernando Platas	Diving
117	Federated States of Micronesia	Manuel Minginfel	Weightlifting
118	Republic of Moldova	Vadim Vacarciuc	Weightlifting
119	Monaco	Thierry Vatrican	Judo
120	Mongolia	Badmaanyambuugiin Bat-Erdene	Judo
121	Morocco	Adil Belgaid	Judo
122	Mozambique	Jorge Duvane	Athletics
123	Myanmar	Maung Maung Nge	Athletics
124	Namibia	Paulus Ali Nuumbembe	Boxing
125	Nauru	Marcus Stephen	Weightlifting
126	Nepal	Chitra Bahadur Gurung	Swimming
127	Netherlands	Anky van Grunsven	Equestrian
128	Netherlands Antilles	Cor van Aanholt	Sailing
129	New Zealand	Blyth Tait	Equestrian
130	Nicaragua	Walter Martínez	Shooting
131	Niger	Mamane Sani Ali	Athletics
132	Nigeria	Sunday Bada	Athletics
133	Norway	Vebjørn Rodal	Athletics
134	Oman	Mohamed Amer Al-Malky	Athletics
135	Pakistan	Ahmed Alam	Field hockey
136	Palau	Valerie Pedro	Weightlifting
137	Palestine	Ramy Deeb	Athletics
138	Panama	Eileen Coparropa	Swimming
139	Papua New Guinea	Xenia Peni	Swimming
140	Paraguay	Nery Kennedy	Athletics
141	Peru	Rosa García	Volleyball
142	Philippines	Donald Geisler	Taekwondo
143	Poland	Andrzej Wroński	Wrestling
144	Portugal	Miguel Maia	Beach volleyball
145	Puerto Rico	Enrique Figueroa	Sailing
146	Qatar	Ibrahim Ismail Muftah	Athletics
147	Romania	Elisabeta Lipă	Rowing
148	Russian Federation	Andrey Lavrov	Handball
149	Rwanda	Pierre Karemera	Official
150	Saint Kitts and Nevis	Kim Collins	Athletics
151	Saint Lucia	Dominic Johnson	Athletics
152	Saint Vincent and the Grenadines	Pamenos Ballantyne	Athletics
153	Samoa	Pauga Lalau	Boxing
154	San Marino	Emanuela Felici	Shooting
155	São Tomé and Príncipe	Naide Gomes	Athletics
156	Saudi Arabia	Khaled Al-Dosari	Taekwondo
157	Senegal	Mame Tacko Diouf	Athletics
158	Seychelles	Benjamin Lo-Pinto	Swimming
159	Sierra Leone	Ekundayo Williams	Athletics
160	Singapore	Joscelin Yeo	Swimming
161	Slovakia	Slavomír Kňazovický	Canoeing
162	Slovenia	Iztok Čop	Rowing
163	Solomon Islands	Primo Higa	Athletics
164	Somalia	Ibrahim Mohamed Aden	Athletics
165	South Africa	Hezekiél Sepeng	Athletics
166	Spain	Manuel Estiarte	Water polo
167	Sri Lanka	Damayanthi Dharsha	Athletics
168	Sudan	Mahmoud Kieno	Chef de mission
169	Suriname	Letitia Vriesde	Athletics
170	Swaziland	Musa Simelane	Boxing
171	Sweden	Anna Olsson	Canoeing
172	Switzerland	Thomas Frischknecht	Cycling
173	Syrian Arab Republic	Moutassem Ghotouq	Chef de mission
174	Chinese Taipei	Chiang Peng-lung	Table tennis
175	Tajikistan	Khurshed Hasanov	Boxing
176	United Republic of Tanzania	Restituta Joseph	Athletics
177	Thailand	Somluck Kamsing	Boxing
178	Togo	Kouami Sacha Denanyoh	Judo
179	Tonga	Ana Siulolo Liku	Athletics
180	Trinidad and Tobago	Ato Boldon	Athletics
181	Tunisia	Omrane Ayari	Wrestling
182	Turkey	Hamza Yerlikaya	Wrestling
183	Turkmenistan	Chary Mamedov	Athletics
184	Uganda	Muhamed Kizito	Boxing
185	Ukraine	Yevhen Braslavets	Sailing
186	United Arab Emirates	Saeed Al-Maktoum	Shooting
187	United States of America	Cliff Meidl	Canoeing
188	Uruguay	Mónica Falcioni	Athletics
189	Uzbekistan	Mahammatkodir Abdullaev	Boxing
190	Vanuatu	Mary-Estelle Kapalu	Athletics
191	Venezuela	Adriana Carmona	Taekwondo
192	Vietnam	Trương Ngọc Để	Chef de mission
193	Virgin Islands	Ameerah Bello	Athletics
194	Yemen	Basheer Al-Khewani	Athletics
195	Yugoslavia	Vladimir Grbić	Volleyball
196	Zambia	Samuel Matete	Athletics
197	Zimbabwe	Philip Mukomana	Athletics
198	Individual Olympic Athletes	Victor Ramos	Boxing
199	Australia	Andrew Gaze	Basketball

== See also ==
- 2004 Summer Olympics national flag bearers
- 2008 Summer Olympics national flag bearers
- 2008 Summer Paralympics national flag bearers
- 2010 Winter Olympics national flag bearers
