= Wong Ching =

Hong Kong table tennis player

Personal information
- Nationality: Hong Konger
- Born: 18 August 1980 (age 45)

Sport
- Sport: Table tennis

Wong Ching (born 18 August 1980) is a Hong Kong table tennis player. She competed in the women's singles event at the 2000 Summer Olympics.
