= OSCC =

OSCC may refer to:

- Olympic Security Command Centre - a security organization in use for the 2000 Olympic Games in Sydney, Australia.
- Ontario Student Classics Conference - a youth Classics organization in Ontario, Canada.
- Otago Sports Car Club - a motorsport club in Dunedin, New Zealand.
- Oral Squamous Cell Carcinoma - in medical
- Orchestre de la Société des Concerts du Conservatoire - a Parisian symphony orchestra which performed from 1828 to 1967.
