= Rinko Sakata =

Japanese table tennis player

Personal information
- Nationality: Japanese
- Born: 24 May 1973 (age 51)

Sport
- Sport: Table tennis

Rinko Sakata (born 24 May 1973) is a Japanese table tennis player. She competed in the women's singles event at the 2000 Summer Olympics.
