= Tatiana Al-Najar =

Jordanian table tennis player

Personal information
- Native name: تاتيانا النجار
- National team: Jordan
- Born: May 11, 1967 (age 59)

Sport
- Country: Jordan
- Sport: Table tennis
- Rank: 374 (December 2005)
- Club: Madinat Al-Husain
Medal record
Women's table tennis
Representing Jordan
Arab Championships
| Gold medal – first place | 2012 Amman | Singles |
- Updated on 16 July 2017

Tatiana Al-Najar (Arabic: تاتيانا النجار; born May 11, 1967) is a Jordanian Olympic table tennis player. She represented Jordan in 2000 Summer Olympics in Sydney. She did not participate in any other Summer Olympics, and she failed to qualify for the 2012 Summer Olympics in London, however, she won Arab Table Tennis Championships in the next year.

== Olympic participation ==
=== Sydney 2000 ===
Al-Najar was the oldest participant for Jordan in that tournament aged 33 years and 130 days then.

Table tennis – Women's Singles – Preliminary Round

Group P
| Rank | Athlete | W | L | GW | GL | PW | PL | SWE | BLR | JOR |
|---|---|---|---|---|---|---|---|---|---|---|
| 1 | Marie Svensson (SWE) | 2 | 0 | 6 | 2 | 156 | 111 | X | 3–2 | 3–0 |
| 2 | Tatyana Kostromina (BLR) | 1 | 1 | 5 | 3 | 142 | 129 | 2–3 | X | 3–0 |
| 3 | Tatiana Al-Najar (JOR) | 0 | 2 | 0 | 6 | 68 | 126 | 0–3 | 0–3 | X |

== Honors ==
- Arab Table Tennis Championships Amman 2012 – Women's Singles: Champion
