= Anne Boileau =

French table tennis player

Personal information
- Nationality: French
- Born: 16 July 1975 (age 50) Les Sables-d'Olonne, France

Sport
- Sport: Table tennis

Anne Boileau (born 16 July 1975) is a French table tennis player. She competed in the women's singles event at the 2000 Summer Olympics.
