= Great Big Events =

In May 2024 Great Big Events was acquired by RWS Global and now operates as RWS Global Sports

Established in 1995, Great Big Events is an international Sport Presentation and Event Management company with offices in Australia, United Kingdom, North America and the Middle East.

The company predominantly works with international sporting events as well as cultural, public and government events. Amongst its many notable sporting achievements, the company has produced the Sydney 2000, Beijing 2008, London 2012 and Tokyo 2020 Olympic and Paralympic Games, alongside five Commonwealth Games and over 50 World Cups and 40 World Championships across various sports.

The company has in-house services including Sport Presentation, Vision and Content Creation, App Development, Technical Management, Music Production and Ceremonies.

GBE have partnered with a number of International Federations on consultation projects to create Sport Presentation guidelines and templates.

Great Big Events has been responsible for Sport Presentation in more than 55 sports at an international level.

Events delivered include:

- 2024 World Aquatics Championships Doha
- 2023 Saudi Games
- 2023 Para Swimming World Championships Manchester
- 2022 UEFA Women's EURO England
- 2020 Tokyo Olympic & Paralympic Games
- 2018 Gold Coast Commonwealth Games
- 2017 Budapest FINA World Championships
- 2015 Toronto Pan American Games
- 2015 Baku European Games
- 2014 Glasgow Commonwealth Games
- 2012 London Olympic and Paralympic Games
- 2011 Rugby World Cup New Zealand
- 2008 Beijing Olympic and Paralympic Games
- 2007 Rugby World Cup France
- 2006 Melbourne Commonwealth Games
- 2003 Rugby World Cup Australia
- 2002 Manchester Commonwealth Games
- 2000 Sydney Olympic and Paralympic Games
