= Table tennis at the 2000 Summer Olympics =

Table tennis at the Games of the XXVII Olympiad
- Venue: State Sports Centre
- Dates: 16 – 25 September 2000
- Competitors: 171 from 48 nations

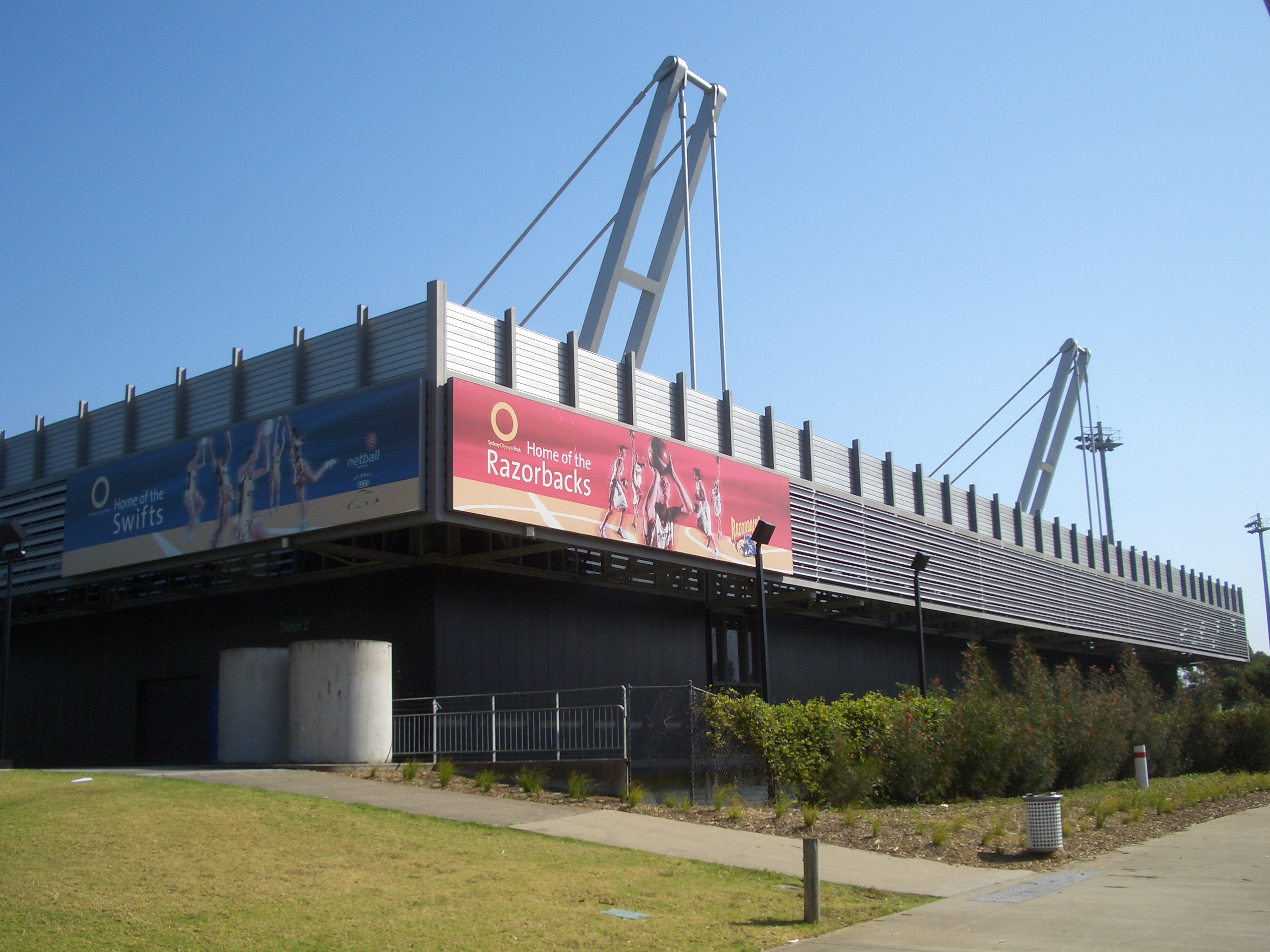
Table Tennis events were held at the State Sports Centre in Sydney Olympic Park.

The table tennis competition at the 2000 Summer Olympics consisted of four events.

== Participating nations ==
A total of 171 athletes (86 men and 85 women), representing 48 NOCs, competed in four events.

- Algeria (2)
- Argentina (2)
- Australia (9)
- Austria (5)
- Belarus (5)
- Belgium (2)
- Brazil (3)
- Canada (6)
- Chile (5)
- China (9)
- Croatia (4)
- Cuba (5)
- Czech Republic (2)
- Denmark (2)
- Egypt (5)
- France (5)
- Germany (8)
- Great Britain (1)
- Greece (2)
- Hong Kong (4)
- Hungary (3)
- India (3)
- Indonesia (2)
- Iran (1)
- Japan (9)
- Jordan (1)
- Lithuania (2)
- Luxembourg (2)
- Mauritius (1)
- Netherlands (2)
- New Zealand (3)
- Nigeria (7)
- Poland (2)
- Qatar (1)
- Romania (3)
- Russia (3)
- Singapore (2)
- South Korea (8)
- Sweden (6)
- Chinese Taipei (7)
- Thailand (1)
- Tunisia (1)
- Turkmenistan (1)
- Uganda (1)
- Ukraine (1)
- United States (8)
- Venezuela (2)
- FR Yugoslavia (2)

== Medal summary ==
| Event | Gold | Silver | Bronze |
|---|---|---|---|
| Men's singles | Kong Linghui; China | Jan-Ove Waldner; Sweden | Liu Guoliang; China |
| Men's doubles | Wang Liqin / Yan Sen; China | Liu Guoliang / Kong Linghui; China | Jean-Philippe Gatien / Patrick Chila; France |
| Women's singles | Wang Nan; China | Li Ju; China | Chen Jing; Chinese Taipei |
| Women's doubles | Li Ju / Wang Nan; China | Sun Jin / Yang Ying; China | Kim Moo-kyo / Ryu Ji-hae; South Korea |

== Medal table ==
| Rank | Nation | Gold | Silver | Bronze | Total |
|---|---|---|---|---|---|
| 1 | China | 4 | 3 | 1 | 8 |
| 2 | Sweden | 0 | 1 | 0 | 1 |
| 3 | Chinese Taipei | 0 | 0 | 1 | 1 |
| 3 | France | 0 | 0 | 1 | 1 |
| 3 | South Korea | 0 | 0 | 1 | 1 |
| Totals (5 entries) | | 4 | 4 | 4 | 12 |

== Sources ==
- Official Olympic Report
- International Table Tennis Federation (ITTF)
- "Table Tennis at the 2000 Sydney Summer Games". www.sports-reference.com. Archived from the original on 5 April 2018.
