= Chen-Tong Fei-Ming =

Taiwanese table tennis player

Chen-Tong Fei-Ming (born 23 October 1968), born Tong Fei-Ming (simplified Chinese: 童飞鸣; traditional Chinese: 童飛鳴), is a Chinese-born table tennis player who represented Chinese Taipei at the 2000 Summer Olympics.
