= Aida Steshenko =

Turkmenistan table tennis player

Personal information
- Nationality: Turkmenistani
- Born: August 11, 1968 (age 57)

Sport
- Sport: Table tennis

Aida Steshenko (born August 11, 1968) is a table tennis player from Turkmenistan who participated in the 1996 and 2000 Summer Olympics and five World Table Tennis Championships.

== Early life ==
Steshenko was born on 11 August 1968 and received her degree from an Armenian university.

== Career ==
Steshenko competed in both the women's singles and doubles events during the 1993, 1995 and 1997 World Table Tennis Championships. She represented Turkmenistan at the 1996 Summer Olympics in table tennis women's singles category. However, she lost all three of her matches and could not advance beyond the group stage. At the next Olympics too she lost all of her matches and was eliminated in the groups. She also participated in the World Championships held in 1999 (individual) and 2000 (team).

In 2001, she moved to Italy and became a coach for the Tennistavolo Feminese Riposto Association and joined the ASD ANSPI Tennistavolo Cortemaggiore for two seasons during 2011–13. Steshenko succeeded Romano Rodella to become the president of ASD Tennistavolo Battini Agri Asola in 2014.
