= Zita Molnár =

Hungarian table tennis player

Personal information
- Nationality: Hungarian
- Born: 17 March 1976 (age 49); Budapest, Hungary

Sport
- Sport: Table tennis

Zita Molnár (born 17 March 1976) is a Hungarian table tennis player. She competed in the women's singles event at the 2000 Summer Olympics.
