= Olympic Security Command Centre =

Olympic Security Command Centre (OSCC) was formed in 1995 to plan for and conduct security of the 2000 Sydney Olympic and Paralympic Games. The OSCC was commanded by Assistant Commissioner Paul McKinnon of the NSW Police.

The OSCC was formed along functional and Olympic Precinct lines, which supported all of the Olympic Venues and sports. There were three Precinct Commanders and an Olympic Precinct and Regional Operations command centre formed as part of OSCC. A number of liaison officers from NSW emergency services and other agencies were also present. These included:

- Ambulance Service of New South Wales
- New South Wales Fire Brigades
- Australian Defence Force
- Australian Federal Police
- Australian Government

== Logo ==
The logo of the OSCC was created by Paul McKinnon and was used on lapel pins by unit members (White given as gifts to visitors, blue only to unit members).

== See also ==
- 2000 Summer Olympics
