= Singapore at the 2000 Summer Olympics =

- IOC code: SIN
- NOC: Singapore National Olympic Council
- Website: www.singaporeolympics.com

in Sydney
- Competitors: 14 (8 men and 6 women) in 4 sports
- Flag bearer: Joscelin Yeo
- Medals: Gold 0 Silver 0 Bronze 0 Total 0

Summer Olympics appearances (overview)
- 1948; 1952; 1956; 1960; 1964; 1968; 1972; 1976; 1980; 1984; 1988; 1992; 1996; 2000; 2004; 2008; 2012; 2016; 2020; 2024

Singapore competed at the 2000 Summer Olympics in Sydney, Australia.

== Sailing ==
| Athlete | Event | Race | | | | | | | | | | | Points | Rank |
| Athlete | Event | 1 | 2 | 3 | 4 | 5 | 6 | 7 | 8 | 9 | 10 | 11 | Points | Rank |
|---|---|---|---|---|---|---|---|---|---|---|---|---|---|---|
| Stanley Tan | Laser | 35 | ~~38~~ | 36 | 26 | 26 | 34 | ~~39~~ | 31 | 33 | 34 | 20 | 275 | 38 |
| Tan Wearn Haw; Koh Seng Leong | Men's 470 | 24 | 26 | 22 | 23 | 13 | 21 | ~~30~~ | 25 | 12 | 26 | ~~28~~ | 192 | 28 |

== Shooting ==
| Athlete | Event | Qualification | | Final | | Total | |
| Athlete | Event | Points | Rank | Points | Rank | Points | Rank |
|---|---|---|---|---|---|---|---|
| Shirley Ng | Women's 10 m air pistol | 359 | 44 | Did not advance | | | |

== Swimming ==
Men

| Athlete | Event | Heat | | Semifinal | | Final | |
| Athlete | Event | Time | Rank | Time | Rank | Time | Rank |
|---|---|---|---|---|---|---|---|
| Mark Chay | 100 m freestyle | 52.24 | 47 | Did not advance | | | |
| Mark Chay | 200 m freestyle | 1:52.22 | 23 | Did not advance | | | |
| Leslie Kwok | 50 m freestyle | 24.00 | 49 | Did not advance | | | |
| Daniel Liew | 100 m breaststroke | 1:06.41 | 57 | Did not advance | | | |
| Sng Ju Wei | 400 m freestyle | 4:01.34 | 37 | —N/a | | Did not advance | |
| Gary Tan | 100 m backstroke | 58.69 | 45 | Did not advance | | | |
| Gary Tan | 200 m backstroke | 2:06.32 | 37 | Did not advance | | | |

Women

| Athlete | Event | Heat | | Semifinal | | Final | |
| Athlete | Event | Time | Rank | Time | Rank | Time | Rank |
|---|---|---|---|---|---|---|---|
| Christel Bouvron | 400 m freestyle | 4:25.16 | 36 | —N/a | | Did not advance | |
| Christel Bouvron | 200 m butterfly | 2:17.62 | 32 | Did not advance | | | |
| Nicolette Teo | 200 m breaststroke | 2:37.39 | 30 | Did not advance | | | |
| Joscelin Yeo | 50 m freestyle | 26.71 | 37 | Did not advance | | | |
| Joscelin Yeo | 100 m freestyle | 57.15 | 22 | Did not advance | | | |
| Joscelin Yeo | 100 m breaststroke | 1:13.25 | 28 | Did not advance | | | |
| Joscelin Yeo | 100 m butterfly | 1:01.28 | 26 | Did not advance | | | |
| Joscelin Yeo | 200 m individual medley | 2:19.18 | 23 | Did not advance | | | |

== Table tennis ==
| Athlete | Event | Group stage | | | Round of 32 | Round of 16 | Quarterfinals | Semifinals | Final / BM | |
| Athlete | Event | Opposition Result | Opposition Result | Rank | Opposition Result | Opposition Result | Opposition Result | Opposition Result | Opposition Result | Rank |
|---|---|---|---|---|---|---|---|---|---|---|
| Jing Junhong | Women's singles | Li (NZL); W 3–0 | Tepes (CHI); W 3–0 | 1 Q | Sun (CHN); W 3–0 | Geng (CAN); W 3–2 | Steff (ROU); W 3–1 | Li (CHN); L 1–3 | Bronze medal match Chen (TPE); L 1–3 | 4 |
| Li Jiawei | Women's singles | Bye | | | Liu (AUT); W 3–1 | Wang (CHN); L 2–3 | Did not advance | | | |
| Jing Junhong; Li Jiawei | Women's doubles | Bye | | | —N/a | Aganović / Boroš (CRO); L 2–3 | Did not advance | | | |
