= Irina Palina =

Russian table tennis player

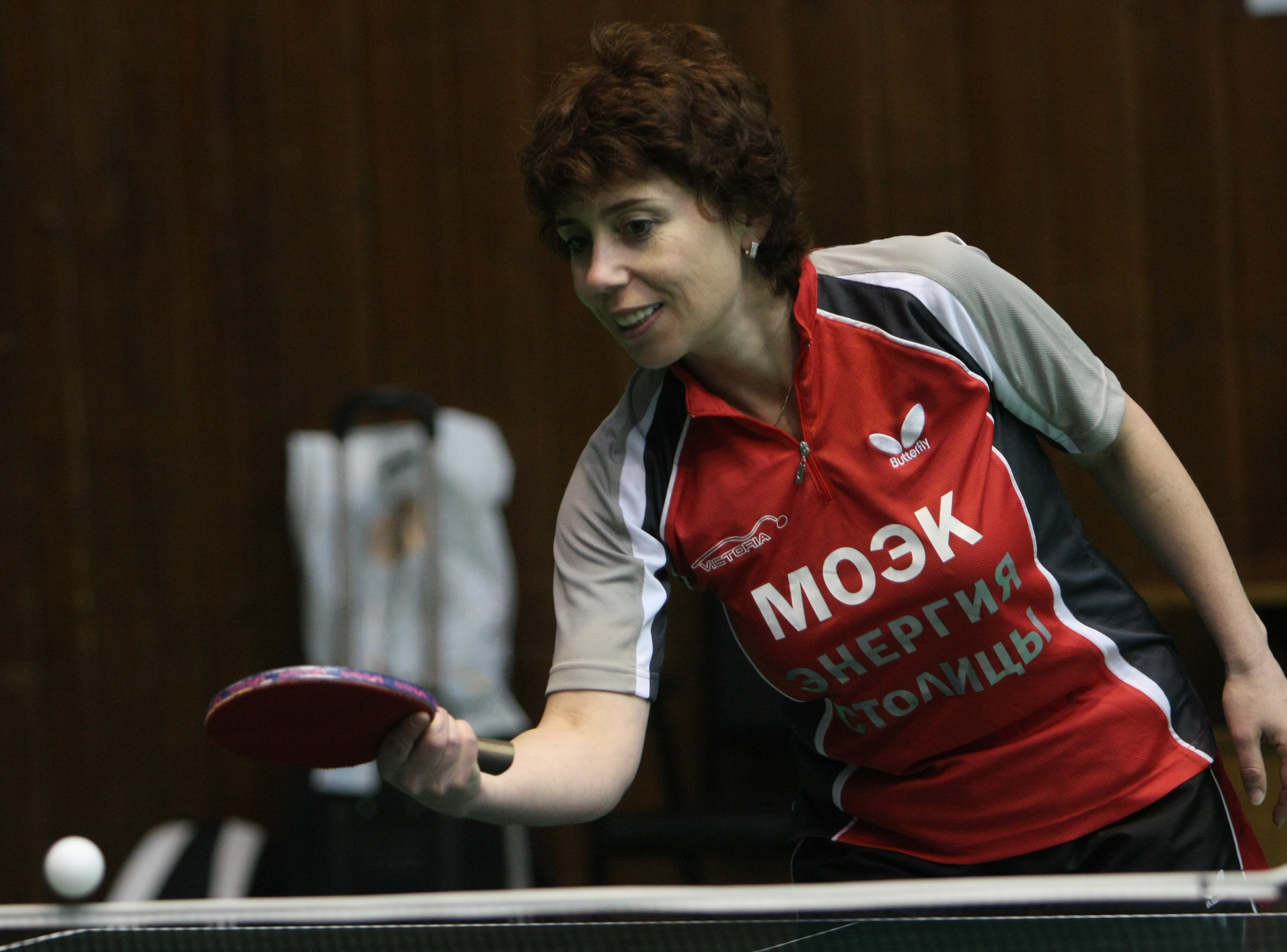

Personal information
- Nationality: Russia Soviet Union
- Born: 15 January 1970 (age 56)

Sport
- Sport: Table tennis
Medal record
Women's table tennis
Representing Russia
World Cup
Gold medal – first place	1994 Nimes	Team
European Championships
Representing Soviet Union
Silver medal – second place	1990 Gothenburg	Doubles
Representing Unified Team
Bronze medal – third place	1992 Stuttgart	Doubles
Representing Russia
Silver medal – second place	1994 Birmingham	Doubles
Gold medal – first place	1994 Birmingham	Team
Bronze medal – third place	2002 Zagreb	Doubles
Bronze medal – third place	2003 Courmayeur	Doubles
Bronze medal – third place	2005 Aarhus	Doubles
Silver medal – second place	2007 Belgrad	Team

Irina Palina (born 15 January 1970) is a former female international table tennis player from Russia.

== Table tennis career ==
She won a gold medal in the Women's Team event at the Table Tennis World Cup in 1994.

She also won an English Open title.

== See also ==
- List of table tennis players
- List of World Table Tennis Championships medalists
