= Chary Mamedov =

Turkmenistan discus thrower

Personal information
- Nationality: Turkmenistan
- Born: 12 October 1963 (age 62)

Sport
- Sport: Athletics
- Event: Discus throw

Chary Mamedov (born 12 October 1963) is a Turkmenistan athlete. He competed in the men's discus throw at the 2000 Summer Olympics.
