= Marie Svensson =

Swedish table tennis player (born 1967)

Personal information
- Nationality: Sweden
- Born: 9 August 1967 (age 58)

Sport
- Sport: Table tennis
Medal record
Women's table tennis
Representing Sweden
World Championships
Bronze medal – third place	1995 Tianjin	Mixed Doubles
European Championships
Gold medal – first place	1994 Birmingham	Singles
Silver medal – second place	1998 Eindhoven	Doubles
Silver medal – second place	1998 Eindhoven	Mixed Doubles
Silver medal – second place	2000 Bremen	Mixed Doubles
Bronze medal – third place	1986 Prague	Doubles
Bronze medal – third place	1992 Stuttgart	Mixed Doubles
Bronze medal – third place	2000 Bremen	Doubles

Marie Svensson (born 9 August 1967) is a female former international table tennis player from Sweden.

== Table tennis career ==
From 1986 to 2000 she won seven medals in singles, and doubles events in the Table Tennis European Championships, and a bronze medal in the mixed doubles with Erik Lindh at the 1995 World Table Tennis Championships in Tianjin.

== See also ==
- List of table tennis players
- List of World Table Tennis Championships medalists
