= 2000 Summer Olympics =

Multi-sport event in Sydney, Australia

Games of the XXVII Olympiad
- Emblem of the 2000 Summer Olympics (Note: The logo is a stylised image of a torchbearer; the top part, in blue, represents the smoke from the Olympic torch, which draws the outline of the Sydney Opera House; the middle part, in yellow, represents the head and arms of a torchbearer, the arms symbolised by two boomerangs; the bottom part, in red, depicts the torchbearer's legs, also symbolised by a boomerang.)
- Location: Sydney, Australia
- Motto: The Games of the New Millennium
- Nations: 199
- Athletes: 10,647 (6,579 men, 4,068 women)
- Events: 300 in 28 sports (40 disciplines)
- Opening: 15 September 2000
- Closing: 1 October 2000
- Opened by: Governor-General Sir William Deane
- Closed by: IOC President Juan Antonio Samaranch
- Cauldron: Cathy Freeman
- Stadium: Stadium Australia

The 2000 Summer Olympics, officially the Games of the XXVII Olympiad, officially branded as Sydney 2000, and also known as the Games of the New Millennium, were an international multi-sport event held from 15 September to 1 October 2000 in Sydney, New South Wales, Australia. It marked the second time the Summer Olympics were held in Australia, and in the Southern Hemisphere, the first being in Melbourne, in 1956.

Teams from 199 countries participated in the 2000 Games, which were the first to feature at least 300 events in its official sports program. The Games were estimated to have cost A$6.6 billion. These were the final Olympic Games under the IOC presidency of Juan Antonio Samaranch before the arrival of his successor Jacques Rogge.

The final medal tally at the 2000 Summer Olympics was led by the United States, followed by Russia and China with host Australia in fourth place overall. Cameroon, Colombia, Latvia, Mozambique, and Slovenia won a gold medal for the first time in their Olympic histories, while Barbados, Kuwait, Kyrgyzstan, Macedonia, Saudi Arabia, and Vietnam won their first-ever Olympic medals.

The 2000 Games received universal acclaim, with the organisation, volunteers, sportsmanship, and Australian public being lauded in the international media. Bill Bryson of The Times called the Sydney Games "one of the most successful events on the world stage", saying that they "couldn't be better". James Mossop of the Electronic Telegraph called the Games "such a success that any city considering bidding for future Olympics must be wondering how it can reach the standards set by Sydney", while Jack Todd of the Montreal Gazette suggested that the "IOC should quit while it's ahead. Admit there can never be a better Olympic Games, and be done with it," as "Sydney was both exceptional and the best". These Games would provide the inspiration for London's winning bid for the 2012 Olympic Games in 2005; in preparing for the 2012 Games, Lord Coe declared the 2000 Games the "benchmark for the spirit of the Games, unquestionably", admitting that the London organizing committee "attempted in several ways to emulate what the Sydney Organising Committee did." This is also the first Olympics to take place fully in Australia because the 1956 Melbourne Olympics had equestrian events take place in Stockholm because of Australia's strict quarantine regulations.

Australia will host the Summer Olympics in Brisbane in 2032, making it the first Asia-Pacific country to host the Summer Olympics three times.

== Host city selection ==
Sydney won the right to host the Games on 24 September 1993, after being selected over Beijing, Berlin, Istanbul, and Manchester in four rounds of voting, at the 101st IOC Session in Monte Carlo, Monaco.

2000 Summer Olympics bidding results
City	Country	Round			
City	Country	1	2	3	4
Sydney	Australia	30	30	37	45
Beijing	China	32	37	40	43
Manchester	Great Britain	11	13	11	—
Berlin	Germany	9	9	—	—
Istanbul	Turkey	7	—	—	—

Beijing would later be selected to host the 2008 Summer Olympics eight years later on 13 July 2001 and the 2022 Winter Olympics twenty-two years later on 31 July 2015.

Brasília, Milan, and Tashkent made bids before deciding to withdraw during the bidding process. Milan would later be selected to host the 2026 Winter Olympics along with Cortina d'Ampezzo twenty-six years later on 24 June 2019.

== The Games ==
=== Costs ===
The Oxford Olympics Study 2016 estimates the outturn cost of the Sydney 2000 Summer Olympics at US$5 billion in 2015 dollars and cost overrun at 90% in real terms. This includes sports-related costs only; that is, (i) operational costs incurred by the organising committee to stage the Games, e.g., expenditures for technology, transportation, workforce, administration, security, catering, ceremonies, and medical services, and (ii) direct capital costs incurred by the host city and country or private investors to build; e.g., the competition venues, the Olympic village, international broadcast centre, and media and press centre, which are required to host the Games. Indirect capital costs are not included, such as for road, rail, airport infrastructure, hotel upgrades, or other business investments incurred in preparation for the Games but not directly related to staging the Games. The cost for Sydney 2000 compares with a cost of US$4.6 billion for Rio 2016, US$40‍–‍44 billion for Beijing 2008, and US$51 billion for Sochi 2014, the most expensive Olympics in history. The average cost for the Summer Games since 1960 is US$5.2 billion, average cost overrun is 176%.

In 2000, the Auditor-General of New South Wales reported that the Sydney Games cost A$6.6 billion, with a net cost to the public between A$1.7 and A$2.4 billion. In the years leading up to the Games, funds were shifted from education and health programs to cover Olympic expenses.

It has been estimated that the economic impact of the 2000 Olympics was that A$2.1 billion has been shaved from public consumption. Economic growth was not stimulated to a net benefit, and, in the years after 2000, foreign tourism to NSW grew by less than tourism to Australia as a whole. A "multiplier" effect on broader economic development was not realised, as a simple "multiplier" analysis fails to capture that resources have to be redirected from elsewhere: the building of a stadium is at the expense of other public works such as extensions to hospitals. Building sporting venues does not add to the aggregate stock of productive capital in the years following the Games: "Equestrian centers, softball compounds, and man-made rapids are not particularly useful beyond their immediate function."

Many venues that were constructed in Sydney Olympic Park failed financially in the years immediately following the Olympics to meet the expected bookings to meet upkeep expenses. It was only the 2003 Rugby World Cup that reconnected the park back to citizens. In recent years, infrastructure costs for some facilities have been of growing concern to the NSW Government, especially facilities in Western Sydney. Proposed metro and light rail links from Olympic Park to Parramatta have been estimated to cost in the same order of magnitude as the public expenditure on the Games. Stadium Australia had been considered for demolition in 2017 by then NSW Premier Gladys Berejiklian, citing that the stadium was "built for an Olympics" but not for modern spectators. The plan was scrapped in 2020 during the COVID-19 pandemic. The Dunc Gray Velodrome has also struggled to keep up its $500,000-per-year maintenance costs, although it is still used for track cycling events.

=== Chronological summary of the 2000 Summer Olympics ===
Although the Opening Ceremony was not scheduled until 15 September, the football competitions began with preliminary matches on 13 September. Among the pre-ceremony fixtures, host nation Australia lost 1‍–‍0 to Italy at the Melbourne Cricket Ground, which was the main stadium for the 1956 Melbourne Olympics.

==== Day 1: 15 September ====
===== Cultural display highlights =====
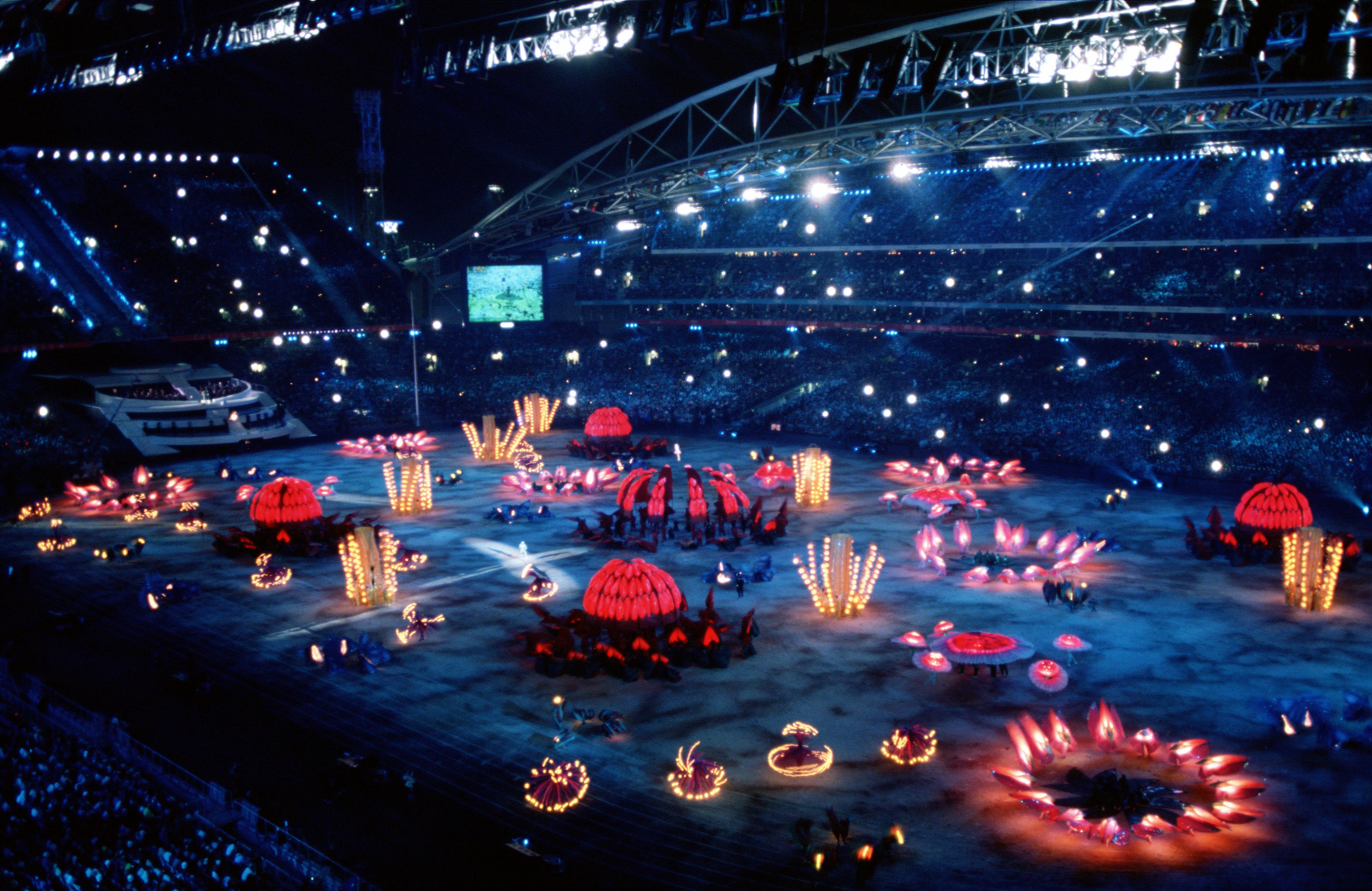
The 2000 Summer Olympics Opening Ceremony at Stadium Australia, 15 September 2000

The opening ceremony began with a tribute to the pastoral heritage of the Australian stockmen and the importance of the stock horse in Australia's heritage. It was produced and filmed by the Sydney Olympic Broadcasting Organisation and the home nation broadcaster Seven Network. This was introduced by lone rider Steve Jefferys and his rearing Australian stock horse "Ammo". At the cracking of Jefferys' stockwhip, a further 120 riders entered the stadium, their stock horses performing intricate steps, including forming the five Olympic Rings, sounded by a new version of the song that Bruce Rowland had previously composed for the 1982 film The Man from Snowy River.

The Australian National Anthem was sung in the first verse by Human Nature and the second by Julie Anthony.

The cultural segments of the event take place with many aspects of the land and its people: the affinity of the mainly coastal-dwelling Australians with the sea that surrounds the Island Continent. The indigenous inhabitation of the land, the coming of the First Fleet, the continued immigration from many nations, and the rural industry on which the economy of the nation was built, including a display representing the harshness of rural life based on the paintings of Sir Sidney Nolan. Two memorable scenes were the representation of the heart of the country by 200 Aboriginal women from Central Australia who danced up "the mighty spirit of god to protect the Games" and the overwhelmingly noisy representation of the construction industry by hundreds of tap-dancing teenagers.

Because the wife of then-IOC President Juan Antonio Samaranch was seriously ill and unable to accompany her husband to the Olympics, Dawn Fraser, former Australian Olympic Champion swimmer and member of the Parliament of New South Wales, accompanied Samaranch during the Australian cultural segments, explaining to him some of the cultural references that are unfamiliar for the people from outside Australia.

===== Formal presentation =====
A record 199 nations entered the stadium, with a record 80 of them winning at least one medal. The only missing IOC member was Afghanistan, which was banned due to the extremist rule of the Taliban's oppression of women and its prohibition of sports. The ceremony featured a unified entrance by the athletes of North and South Korea, (Note: The national teams of North Korea and South Korea competed separately in the Olympic events, even though they marched together as a unified Korean team in the opening ceremony.) using a specially designed unification flag: a white background flag with a blue map of the Korean Peninsula. Four athletes from East Timor also marched in the parade of nations as individual Olympic athletes and marched directly before the host country. Although the country-to-be had no National Olympic Committee then, they were allowed to compete under the Olympic Flag with country code IOA. The Governor-General, Sir William Deane, opened the games.

The Olympic Flag was carried around the arena by eight former Australian Olympic champions: Bill Roycroft, Murray Rose, Liane Tooth, Gillian Rolton, Marjorie Jackson, Lorraine Crapp, Michael Wenden and Nick Green. During the raising of the Olympics Flag, the Olympic Hymn was sung by the Millennium Choir of the Greek Orthodox Archdiocese of Australia in Greek. Following this, Tina Arena sang a purpose-written pop song, The Flame.

The opening ceremony concluded with the lighting of the Olympic Flame, which was brought into the stadium by former Australian Olympic champion Herb Elliott. Then, celebrating one hundred years of women's participation in the Olympic Games, former Australian women Olympic medalists Betty Cuthbert and Raelene Boyle, Dawn Fraser, Shirley Strickland (later Shirley Strickland de la Hunty), Shane Gould and Debbie Flintoff-King brought the torch through the stadium, handing it over to Cathy Freeman, who lit the flame in the cauldron within a circle of fire. The choice of Freeman, an Aboriginal woman, to light the flame was notable given the history of human rights abuses against Aboriginal people in Australia. Following her lighting, Freeman was the subject of racial abuse from some Australians. The planned spectacular climax to the ceremony was delayed by the technical glitch of a computer switch which malfunctioned, causing the sequence to shut down by giving a false reading. This meant that the Olympic flame was suspended in mid-air for about four minutes rather than immediately rising up a water-covered ramp to the top of the stadium. When the cause of the problem was discovered, the program was overridden and the cauldron continued its course, and the ceremony concluded with a fireworks display.

==== Day 2: 16 September ====
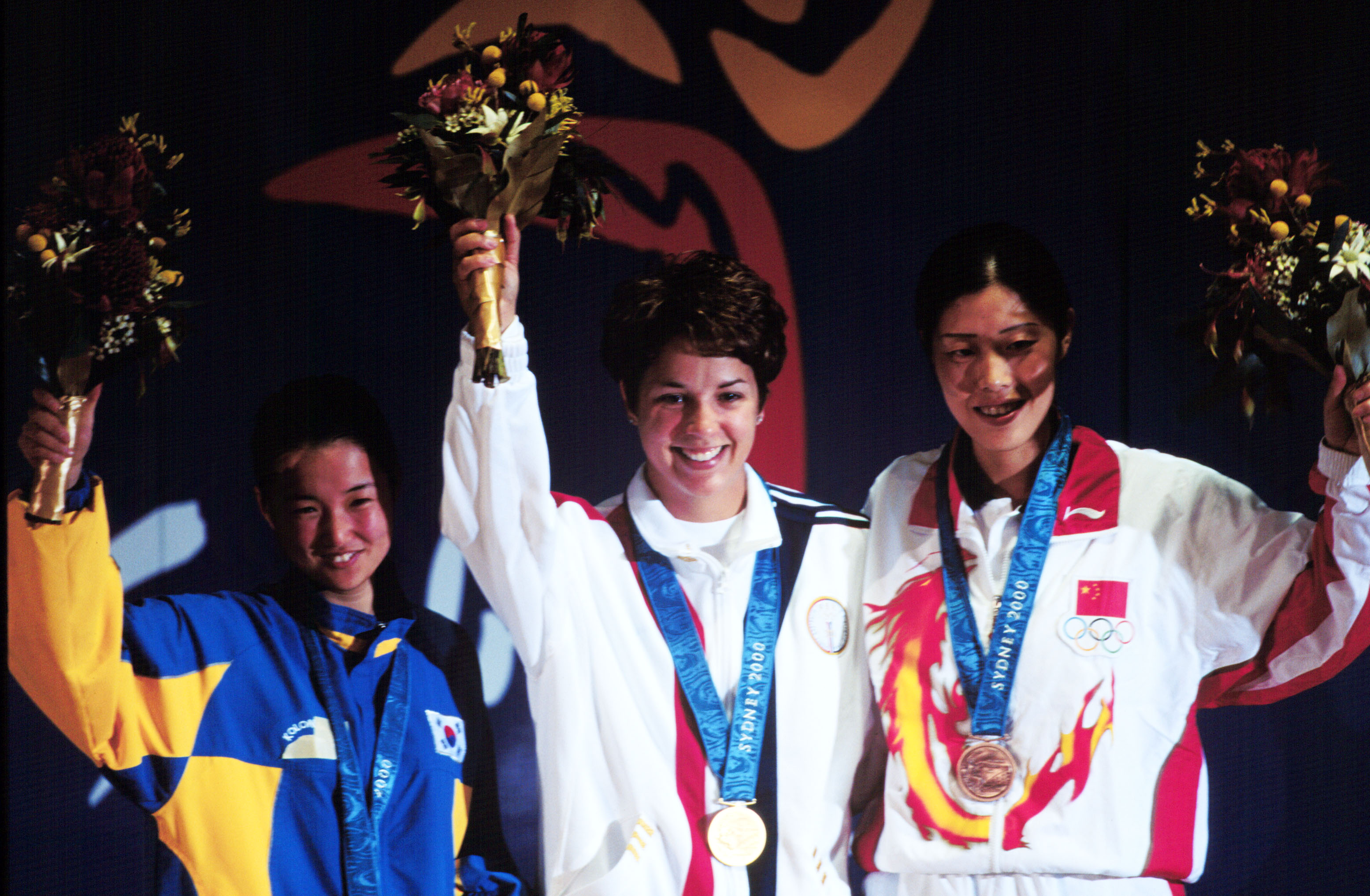
Gold medallist Nancy Johnson (centre) of the U.S., raises her hands with silver medallist Kang Cho-hyun (left), of South Korea, and bronze winner Gao Jing (right), of China, during the first medal ceremony of the 2000 Olympic Games.

The first medals of the Games were awarded in the women's 10-metre air rifle competition, which was won by Nancy Johnson of the United States.

The triathlon made its Olympic debut with the women's race. Set in the surroundings of the Sydney Opera House, Brigitte McMahon representing Switzerland swam, cycled and ran to the first gold medal in the sport, beating the favoured home athletes such as Michelie Jones who won silver. McMahon only passed Jones in sight of the finish line.

The first star of the Games was 17-year-old Australian Ian Thorpe, who first set a new world record in the 400-metre freestyle final before competing in an exciting 4 × 100 m freestyle final. Swimming the last leg, Thorpe passed the leading American team and arrived in a new world record time, two-tenths of a second ahead of the Americans. In the same event for women, the Americans also broke the world record, finishing ahead of the Netherlands and Sweden.

Samaranch had to leave for home, as his wife was severely ill. Upon arrival, his wife had already died. Samaranch returned to Sydney four days later. The Olympic flag was flown at half-staff during the period as a sign of respect to Samaranch's wife.

==== Day 3: 17 September ====
Canadian Simon Whitfield sprinted away in the last 100 metres of the men's triathlon, becoming the inaugural winner in the event.

On the cycling track, Robert Bartko beat fellow German Jens Lehmann in the individual pursuit, setting a new Olympic Record. Leontien Zijlaard-van Moorsel set a world record in the semi-finals the same event for women.

In the swimming pool, American Tom Dolan beat the world record in the 400-metre medley, successfully defending the title he won in Atlanta four years prior. Dutchwoman Inge de Bruijn also clocked a new world record, beating her own time in the 100 m butterfly final to win by more than a second.

==== Day 4: 18 September ====
The main event for the Australians on the fourth day of the Games was the 200 m freestyle. Dutchman Pieter van den Hoogenband had broken the world record in the semi-finals, taking it from the new Australian hero Ian Thorpe, who came close to the world record in his semi-final heat. As the final race finished, Van den Hoogenband's time was exactly the same as in the semi-finals, finishing ahead of Thorpe by half a second.

China won the gold medal in the men's team all-around gymnastics competition after being the runner-up in the previous two Olympics. The other medals were taken by Ukraine and Russia, respectively.

Zijlaard-van Moorsel lived up to the expectations set by her world record in cycling in the semis by winning the gold medal.

==== Day 7: 21 September ====
During the Women's Gymnastics All-Around, female athletes suffered damning scores and injuries due to improperly installed gymnastics equipment. Gymnasts performing on the vault gave uncharacteristically poor performances and fell. Officials blamed the series of falls and low scores on performance anxiety. It was not until Australian gymnast Allana Slater and her coach, Peggy Liddick, voiced concerns about the equipment that officials discovered the apparatus was five centimetres, or almost two inches, lower than it should have been. While athletes were given the opportunity to perform again, for some of them, the damage to their mental or physical health caused by the vault was irreparable. Chinese gymnast Kui Yuanyuan and American gymnast Kristen Maloney both injured their legs while attempting to stick their landings, with Kui needing to be carried to an examination area and Maloney damaging a titanium rod that had recently been implanted in her shin. Romanian gymnast Andreea Răducan ultimately took gold while her teammates, Simona Amânar and Maria Olaru took silver and bronze, respectively.

==== Day 9: 23 September ====
By rowing in the winning coxless four, Steve Redgrave of Great Britain became a member of a select group who had won gold medals at five consecutive Olympics.

The swimming 4 x 100-metre medley relay of B.J. Bedford, Megan Quann (Jendrick), Jenny Thompson and Dara Torres became the first women's relay team to finish in under four minutes, swimming 3:58 and setting a world record, claiming the gold medal for the United States.

==== Day 10: 24 September ====
Rulon Gardner, never an NCAA champion or a world medalist, beat Alexander Karelin of Russia to win gold in the super heavyweight class, Greco-Roman wrestling. Karelin had won gold in Seoul, Barcelona and Atlanta. Before this fight, he had never lost in international competition, had been unbeaten in all competitions in thirteen years, and had not surrendered a point in a decade.

==== Day 11: 25 September ====
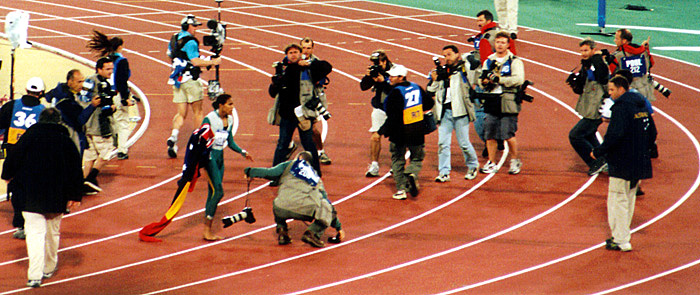
Cathy Freeman after the 400-metre final

Australian Cathy Freeman won the 400-metre final in front of a jubilant Sydney crowd at the Olympic Stadium, ahead of Lorraine Graham of Jamaica and Katharine Merry of Great Britain. Freeman's win made her the first competitor in Olympic Games history to light the Olympic Flame and then go on to win a gold medal. The attendance at the stadium was 112,524 – the largest attendance for any sport in Olympic Games history.

In a men's basketball pool match between the United States and France, the USA's Vince Carter made one of the most famous dunks in basketball history. After getting the ball off a steal, the 6'6"/1.98 m Carter drove to the basket, with 7'2"/2.18 m centre Frédéric Weis in his way. Carter jumped, spread his legs in midair, scraped Weis' head on the way up, and dunked. The French media dubbed the feat le dunk de la mort ("the dunk of death").

==== Day 14: 28 September ====
The Canadian flag at the athletes' village was lowered to half-mast, as Canadian athletes paid tribute to the former prime minister Pierre Trudeau after hearing of his death in Montreal (because of the time zone difference, it was 29 September in Sydney when Trudeau died). The Canadian flag was flown at half-mast for the remainder of the Olympics, on orders from both IOC President Juan Antonio Samaranch and Canadian Foreign Affairs Minister Lloyd Axworthy. The state funeral took place on 3 October, two days after the closing ceremony, allowing enough time for those concerned to head back to Canada after the Games and attend his funeral.

==== Day 16: 30 September ====
Cameroon won a historic gold medal over Spain in the Men's Olympic Football Final at the Olympic Stadium. The game went to a penalty shootout, which was won by Cameroon 5‍–‍3.

==== Day 17: 1 October ====
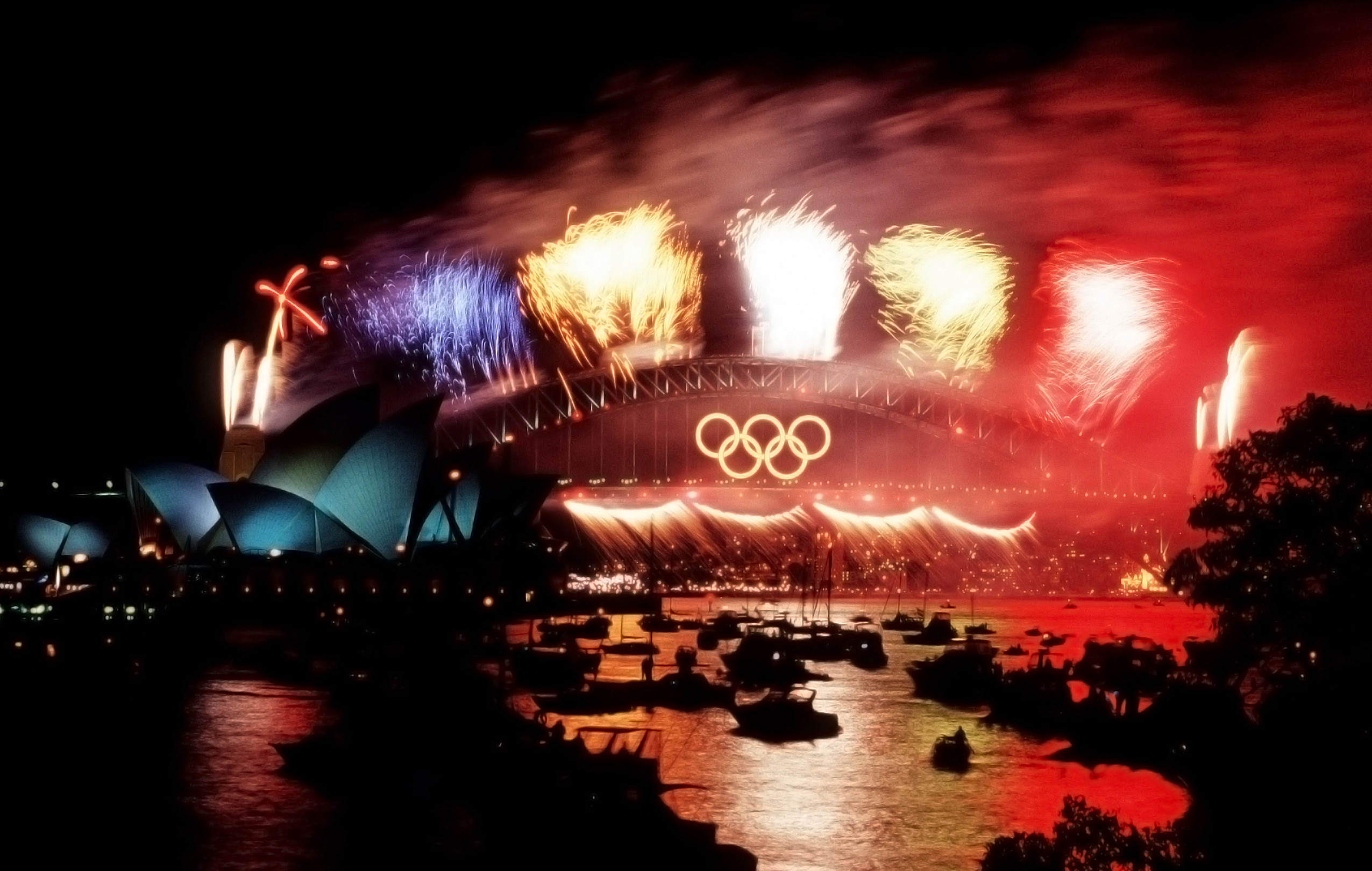
Olympic colours on the Sydney Harbour Bridge

The last event of the Games was the Men's Marathon, contested on a course that started in North Sydney. The event was won by Ethiopian Gezahegne Abera, with Kenyan Erick Wainaina second, and Tesfaye Tola, also of Ethiopia, third. It was the first time since the 1968 Olympics that an Ethiopian won the gold medal in this event.

The closing ceremony commenced with Christine Anu performing her version of the Warumpi Band's song "My Island Home", with several Aboriginal dancers atop the Geodome Stage in the middle of the stadium, around which several hundred umbrella and lamp box kids created an image of Aboriginal Dreamtime. The Geodome Stage was used throughout the ceremony, which was a flat stage mechanically raised into the shape of a geode.

IOC President Juan Antonio Samaranch declared at the Closing Ceremony,

I am proud and happy to proclaim that you have presented to the world the best Olympic Games ever.

Subsequent Summer Olympics held in Athens, Beijing and London have been described by Samaranch's successor Jacques Rogge as "unforgettable, dream Games", "truly exceptional" and "happy and glorious games", respectively – the practice of declaring games the "best ever" having been retired after the 2000 Games.

=== Sports ===
The 2000 Summer Olympic program featured 300 events in the following 28 sports:

2000 Summer Olympics Sports Program
- Aquatics
  - Diving (8)
  - Swimming (32)
  - Synchronized swimming (2)
  - Water polo (2)
- Archery (4)
- Athletics (46)
- Badminton (5)
- Baseball (1)
- Basketball (2)
- Boxing (12)
- Canoeing
  - Sprint (12)
  - Slalom (4)
- Cycling
  - Road (4)
  - Track (12)
  - Mountain biking (2)
- Equestrian
  - Dressage (2)
  - Eventing (2)
  - Show jumping (2)
- Fencing (10)
- Field hockey (2)
- Football (2)
- Gymnastics
  - Artistic (14)
  - Rhythmic (2)
  - Trampoline (2)
- Handball (2)
- Judo (14)
- Modern pentathlon (2)
- Rowing (14)
- Sailing (11)
- Shooting (17)
- Softball (1)
- Table tennis (4)
- Taekwondo (8)
- Tennis (4)
- Triathlon (2)
- Volleyball
  - Volleyball (2)
  - Beach volleyball (2)
- Weightlifting (15)
- Wrestling
  - Freestyle (8)
  - Greco-Roman (8)

Although demonstration sports were abolished following the 1992 Summer Olympics, the Sydney Olympics featured wheelchair racing as exhibition events on the athletics schedule.

Special quarantine conditions were introduced to allow entry of horses into Australia to participate in equestrian events, avoiding the need for such events to take place elsewhere as had happened at the 1956 Summer Olympics in Melbourne.

=== Calendar ===
All dates are in AEDST (UTC+11); the other two cities, Adelaide uses ACST (UTC+9:30) and Brisbane uses AEST (UTC+10)

OC	Opening ceremony	●	Event competitions	1	Gold medal events	CC	Closing ceremony

September/October 2000		September																		Oct	Events
September/October 2000		13th Wed	14th Thu	15th Fri	16th Sat	17th Sun	18th Mon	19th Tue	20th Wed	21st Thu	22nd Fri	23rd Sat	24th Sun	25th Mon	26th Tue	27th Wed	28th Thu	29th Fri	30th Sat	1st Sun	Events
Ceremonies				OC																CC	—N/a
Aquatics	Diving										●	2	1	●	1	●	3	●	1		44
Aquatics	Swimming				4	4	4	4	4	4	4	4									44
Aquatics	Synchronised swimming												●	●	1		●	1			44
Aquatics	Water polo				●	●	●	●	●		●	1	●	●	●	●		●	●	1	44
Archery					●	●	●	1	1	1	1										4
Athletics											2	3	5	9		7	6	5	8	1	46
Badminton					●	●	●	●	2	1	2										5
Baseball/Softball
Baseball/Softball	Baseball					●	●	●	●		●	●	●		●	1					2
Baseball/Softball	Softball					●	●	●	●	●	●	●		●	1						2
Basketball					●	●	●	●	●	●	●	●	●	●	●	●	●	●	1	1	2
Boxing					●	●	●	●	●	●	●	●	●		●	●	●	●	6	6	12
Canoeing	Slalom					●	2	●	2												16
Canoeing	Sprint														●	●	●	●	6	6	16
Cycling	Road cycling														1	1			2		18
Cycling	Track cycling				2	2	1	1	3	3											18
Cycling	Mountain biking											1	1								18
Equestrian					●		●	1	●	●	1			●	1		1	●	1	1	6
Fencing					1	1	1	1	1	2	1	1	1								10
Field hockey					●	●	●	●	●	●	●	●	●	●	●	●	●	1	1		2
Football		●	●		●	●		●	●		●	●		●	●		1	●	1		2
Gymnastics	Artistic				●	●	1	1	1	1			5	5							18
Gymnastics	Rhythmic																●	●	1	1	18
Gymnastics	Trampolining										1	1									18
Handball					●	●	●	●	●	●	●	●	●	●	●		●	●	1	1	2
Judo					2	2	2	2	2	2	2										14
Modern pentathlon																			1	1	2
Rowing						●	●	●	●	●	●	7	7								14
Sailing						●	●	●	●	●	●	●	3	1	●		2	2	3		11
Shooting					2	2	2	2	3	2	2										17
Table tennis					●	●	●	●	●	●	1	1	1	1							4
Taekwondo																2	2	2	2		8
Tennis								●	●	●	●	●	●	●	●	2	2				4
Triathlon					1	1															2
Volleyball	Beach volleyball				●	●	●	●		●	●	●	●	1	1						4
Volleyball	Indoor volleyball				●	●	●	●	●	●	●	●	●	●	●	●	●	●	1	1	4
Weightlifting					1	2	2	2	2		2	1	1	1	1						15
Wrestling													●	●	4	4	●	●	4	4	16
Daily medal events					13	14	15	15	18	18	18	26	25	18	11	17	17	11	40	24	300
Cumulative total					13	27	42	57	75	93	111	137	162	180	191	208	225	236	276	300	300
September/October 2000		13th Wed	14th Thu	15th Fri	16th Sat	17th Sun	18th Mon	19th Tue	20th Wed	21st Thu	22nd Fri	23rd Sat	24th Sun	25th Mon	26th Tue	27th Wed	28th Thu	29th Fri	30th Sat	1st Sun	Total events
September/October 2000		September																		Oct	Total events

=== Participating National Olympic Committees ===
Participating countries

Number of athletes

199 National Olympic Committees (NOCs) participated in the Sydney Games, two more than in the 1996 Summer Olympics; in addition, there were four Timorese Individual Olympic Athletes. Eritrea, the Federated States of Micronesia and Palau made their Olympic debut this year.

Democratic Republic of the Congo was once again designated under that name, after it participated as Zaire from 1984 to 1996.

Afghanistan was the only 1996 participant (and the only existing NOC) that did not participate in the 2000 Olympics, having been banned due to the Taliban's totalitarian rule in Afghanistan, their oppression of women, and its prohibition of sports.

Participating National Olympic Committees
- Albania (4)
- Algeria (47)
- American Samoa (4)
- Andorra (5)
- Angola (30)
- Antigua and Barbuda (3)
- Argentina (143)
- Armenia (25)
- Aruba (5)
- Australia (617) (host)
- Austria (92)
- Azerbaijan (31)
- Bahamas (25)
- Bahrain (4)
- Bangladesh (5)
- Barbados (18)
- Belarus (139)
- Belgium (68)
- Belize (2)
- Benin (4)
- Bermuda (6)
- Bhutan (2)
- Bolivia (5)
- Bosnia and Herzegovina (9)
- Botswana (7)
- Brazil (198)
- British Virgin Islands (1)
- Brunei (2)
- Bulgaria (91)
- Burkina Faso (4)
- Burundi (6)
- Cambodia (4)
- Cameroon (34)
- Canada (294)
- Cape Verde (2)
- Cayman Islands (3)
- Central African Republic (3)
- Chad (2)
- Chile (50)
- China (271)
- Colombia (44)
- Comoros (2)
- Republic of the Congo (5)
- Cook Islands (2)
- Costa Rica (7)
- Croatia (88)
- Cuba (229)
- Cyprus (22)
- Czech Republic (119)
- Democratic Republic of the Congo (2)
- Denmark (97)
- Djibouti (2)
- Dominica (4)
- Dominican Republic (13)
- Ecuador (10)
- Egypt (89)
- El Salvador (8)
- Equatorial Guinea (4)
- Eritrea (3)
- Estonia (33)
- Ethiopia (26)
- Federated States of Micronesia (5)
- Fiji (7)
- Finland (70)
- France (336)
- Gabon (5)
- The Gambia (2)
- Georgia (36)
- Germany (422)
- Ghana (22)
- Great Britain (310)
- Greece (140)
- Grenada (3)
- Guam (7)
- Guatemala (15)
- Guinea (6)
- Guinea-Bissau (3)
- Guyana (4)
- Haiti (5)
- Honduras (20)
- Hong Kong (31)
- Hungary (178)
- Iceland (18)
- India (65)
- Individual Olympic Athletes (4)
- Indonesia (47)
- Iran (33)
- Iraq (4)
- Ireland (64)
- Israel (39)
- Italy (361)
- Ivory Coast (14)
- Jamaica (48)
- Japan (266)
- Jordan (8)
- Kazakhstan (130)
- Kenya (56)
- Kuwait (29)
- Kyrgyzstan (48)
- Laos (3)
- Latvia (45)
- Lebanon (6)
- Lesotho (6)
- Liberia (8)
- Libya (3)
- Liechtenstein (2)
- Lithuania (61)
- Luxembourg (7)
- Macedonia (10)
- Madagascar (11)
- Malawi (2)
- Malaysia (40)
- Maldives (4)
- Mali (5)
- Malta (7)
- Mauritania (2)
- Mauritius (20)
- Mexico (78)
- Moldova (34)
- Monaco (4)
- Mongolia (20)
- Morocco (55)
- Mozambique (5)
- Myanmar (7)
- Namibia (11)
- Nauru (2)
- Nepal (5)
- Netherlands (231)
- Netherlands Antilles (7)
- New Zealand (147)
- Nicaragua (6)
- Niger (4)
- Nigeria (83)
- North Korea (31)
- Norway (93)
- Oman (6)
- Pakistan (27)
- Palau (5)
- Palestine (2)
- Panama (6)
- Papua New Guinea (5)
- Paraguay (5)
- Peru (21)
- Philippines (20)
- Poland (187)
- Portugal (61)
- Puerto Rico (29)
- Qatar (17)
- Romania (145)
- Russia (435)
- Rwanda (5)
- Saint Kitts and Nevis (2)
- Saint Lucia (5)
- Saint Vincent and the Grenadines (4)
- Samoa (5)
- San Marino (4)
- São Tomé and Príncipe (2)
- Saudi Arabia (18)
- Senegal (26)
- Seychelles (9)
- Sierra Leone (3)
- Singapore (14)
- Slovakia (108)
- Slovenia (74)
- Solomon Islands (2)
- Somalia (2)
- South Africa (127)
- South Korea (281)
- Spain (321)
- Sri Lanka (18)
- Sudan (3)
- Suriname (4)
- Swaziland (6)
- Sweden (150)
- Switzerland (102)
- Syria (8)
- Chinese Taipei (55)
- Tajikistan (4)
- Tanzania (4)
- Thailand (52)
- Togo (3)
- Tonga (3)
- Trinidad and Tobago (19)
- Tunisia (47)
- Turkey (57)
- Turkmenistan (8)
- Uganda (13)
- Ukraine (230)
- United Arab Emirates (4)
- United States (586)
- Uruguay (15)
- Uzbekistan (70)
- Vanuatu (3)
- Venezuela (50)
- Vietnam (7)
- Virgin Islands (9)
- Yemen (2)
- FR Yugoslavia (109)
- Zambia (8)
- Zimbabwe (16)

=== Number of athletes by National Olympic Committee ===
10,647 athletes from 199 NOCs participated in the 2000 Summer Olympics.

IOC Letter Code	Country	Athletes
ALB	Albania	4
ALG	Algeria	47
ASA	American Samoa	4
AND	Andorra	5
ANG	Angola	30
ANT	Antigua and Barbuda	3
ARG	Argentina	143
ARM	Armenia	25
ARU	Aruba	5
AUS	Australia	617
AUT	Austria	92
AZE	Azerbaijan	31
BAH	Bahamas	25
BRN	Bahrain	4
BAN	Bangladesh	5
BAR	Barbados	18
BLR	Belarus	139
BEL	Belgium	68
BIZ	Belize	2
BEN	Benin	4
BER	Bermuda	6
BHU	Bhutan	2
BOL	Bolivia	5
BIH	Bosnia and Herzegovina	9
BOT	Botswana	7
BRA	Brazil	198
IVB	British Virgin Islands	1
BRU	Brunei	2
BUL	Bulgaria	91
BUR	Burkina Faso	4
BDI	Burundi	6
CAM	Cambodia	4
CMR	Cameroon	34
CAN	Canada	294
CPV	Cape Verde	2
CAY	Cayman Islands	3
CAF	Central African Republic	3
CHA	Chad	2
CHI	Chile	50
CHN	China	271
COL	Colombia	44
COM	Comoros	2
CGO	Republic of the Congo	5
COK	Cook Islands	2
CRC	Costa Rica	7
CRO	Croatia	88
CUB	Cuba	229
CYP	Cyprus	22
CZE	Czech Republic	119
COD	Democratic Republic of the Congo	2
DEN	Denmark	97
DJI	Djibouti	2
DMA	Dominica	4
DOM	Dominican Republic	13
ECU	Ecuador	10
EGY	Egypt	89
ESA	El Salvador	8
GEQ	Equatorial Guinea	4
ERI	Eritrea	3
EST	Estonia	33
ETH	Ethiopia	26
FSM	Federated States of Micronesia	5
FIJ	Fiji	7
FIN	Finland	70
FRA	France	336
GAB	Gabon	5
GAM	The Gambia	2
GEO	Georgia	36
GER	Germany	422
GHA	Ghana	22
GBR	Great Britain	310
GRE	Greece	140
GRN	Grenada	3
GUM	Guam	7
GUA	Guatemala	15
GUI	Guinea	6
GBS	Guinea-Bissau	3
GUY	Guyana	4
HAI	Haiti	5
HON	Honduras	20
HKG	Hong Kong	31
HUN	Hungary	178
ISL	Iceland	18
IND	India	65
IOA	Individual Olympic Athletes	4
INA	Indonesia	47
IRI	Iran	33
IRQ	Iraq	4
IRL	Ireland	64
ISR	Israel	39
ITA	Italy	361
CIV	Ivory Coast	14
JAM	Jamaica	48
JPN	Japan	266
JOR	Jordan	8
KAZ	Kazakhstan	130
KEN	Kenya	56
KUW	Kuwait	29
KGZ	Kyrgyzstan	48
LAO	Laos	3
LAT	Latvia	45
LIB	Lebanon	6
LES	Lesotho	6
LBR	Liberia	8
LBA	Libya	3
LIE	Liechtenstein	2
LTU	Lithuania	61
LUX	Luxembourg	7
MKD	Macedonia	10
MAD	Madagascar	11
MAW	Malawi	2
MAS	Malaysia	40
MDV	Maldives	4
MLI	Mali	5
MLT	Malta	7
MTN	Mauritania	2
MRI	Mauritius	20
MEX	Mexico	78
MDA	Moldova	34
MON	Monaco	4
MGL	Mongolia	20
MAR	Morocco	55
MOZ	Mozambique	5
MYA	Myanmar	7
NAM	Namibia	11
NRU	Nauru	2
NEP	Nepal	5
NED	Netherlands	231
AHO	Netherlands Antilles	7
NZL	New Zealand	147
NCA	Nicaragua	6
NIG	Niger	4
NGR	Nigeria	83
PRK	North Korea	31
NOR	Norway	93
OMA	Oman	6
PAK	Pakistan	27
PLW	Palau	5
PLE	Palestine	2
PAN	Panama	6
PNG	Papua New Guinea	5
PAR	Paraguay	5
PER	Peru	21
PHI	Philippines	20
POL	Poland	187
POR	Portugal	61
PUR	Puerto Rico	29
QAT	Qatar	17
ROU	Romania	145
RUS	Russia	435
RWA	Rwanda	5
SKN	Saint Kitts and Nevis	2
LCA	Saint Lucia	5
VIN	Saint Vincent and the Grenadines	4
SAM	Samoa	5
SMR	San Marino	4
STP	São Tomé and Príncipe	2
KSA	Saudi Arabia	18
SEN	Senegal	26
SEY	Seychelles	9
SLE	Sierra Leone	3
SIN	Singapore	14
SVK	Slovakia	108
SLO	Slovenia	74
SOL	Solomon Islands	2
SOM	Somalia	2
RSA	South Africa	127
KOR	South Korea	281
ESP	Spain	321
SRI	Sri Lanka	18
SUD	Sudan	3
SUR	Suriname	4
SWZ	Swaziland	6
SWE	Sweden	150
SUI	Switzerland	102
SYR	Syria	8
TPE	Chinese Taipei	55
TJK	Tajikistan	4
TAN	Tanzania	4
THA	Thailand	52
TOG	Togo	3
TGA	Tonga	3
TRI	Trinidad and Tobago	19
TUN	Tunisia	47
TUR	Turkey	57
TKM	Turkmenistan	8
UGA	Uganda	13
UKR	Ukraine	230
UAE	United Arab Emirates	4
USA	United States	586
URU	Uruguay	15
UZB	Uzbekistan	70
VAN	Vanuatu	3
VEN	Venezuela	50
VIE	Vietnam	7
ISV	Virgin Islands	9
YEM	Yemen	2
YUG	FR Yugoslavia	109
ZAM	Zambia	8
ZIM	Zimbabwe	16

== Medal table ==
These are the top ten nations that won medals in the 2000 Games.

The ranking in this table is based on information provided by the International Olympic Committee. Some other sources may be inconsistent due to not taking into account all later doping cases.

Key

‡ Changes in medal standings (see here)

* Host nation (Australia)

2000 Summer Olympics medal table (Note: Figures in table reflect all official changes in medal standings.)
Rank	NOC	Gold	Silver	Bronze	Total
1	United States‡	37	24	32	93
2	Russia‡	32	28	29	89
3	China	28	16	14	58
4	Australia*	16	25	17	58
5	Germany‡	13	17	26	56
6	France	13	14	11	38
7	Italy	13	8	13	34
8	Netherlands	12	9	4	25
9	Cuba	11	11	7	29
10	Great Britain	11	10	7	28
11–80	Remaining NOCs	114	138	167	419
Totals (80 entries)		300	300	327	927

== Organisation ==
SOCOG organisational structure circa 1998 – five groups and 33 divisions reporting to the CEO are organised primarily along functional lines with only a limited number of divisions (e.g. Interstate Football and Villages) anticipating a venue focussed design.

SOCOG organisational structure circa 1999 – functional divisions and precinct/venue streams are organised in a matrix structure linked to the Main Operations Centre (MOC). Some functions such as Project Management (in the Games Coordination group) continue to exist largely outside this matrix structure.

=== Organisations responsible for the Olympics ===
A number of quasi-government bodies were responsible for the construction, organisation and execution of the Sydney Games. These included:

- the Sydney Organising Committee for the Olympic Games (SOCOG) and the Sydney Paralympic Organising Committee (SPOC), primarily responsibles for the staging of the Games
- Olympic Coordination Authority (OCA), primarily responsible for construction and oversight
- Olympic Roads & Transport Authority (ORTA)
- Olympic Security Command Centre (OSCC)
- Olympic Intelligence Centre (OIC)
- JTF Gold, the Australian Defence Force Joint Taskforce Gold
- Sydney Olympic Broadcasting Organisation (nominally part of SOCOG)
- IBM, provider of technology and the Technical Command Centre
- Telstra, provider of telecommunications
- Great Big Events, event management and marketing

These organisations worked closely together and with other bodies such as:

- the International Olympic Committee (IOC)
- the International Paralympic Committee (IPC)
- the Australian Olympic Committee (AOC)
- the Australian Paralympic Committee (APC)
- the other 197 National Olympic Committees (NOCs)
- the other 125 National Paralympic Committees (NPCs)
- the 33 International Sports Federations (IFs)
- all three levels of Australian government (federal, state and local)
- dozens of official sponsor and hundreds of official supplier companies

These bodies are often collectively referred to as the "Olympic Family".

=== Organisation of the Paralympics ===
The organisation of the 2000 Summer Paralympics was the responsibility of the Sydney Paralympic Organising Committee (SPOC). However, much of the planning and operation of the Paralympic Games was outsourced to SOCOG such that most operational programmes planned both the Olympic and Paralympic Games.

=== Other Olympic events ===
The organisation of the Games included not only the actual sporting events, but also the management (and sometimes construction) of the sporting venues and surrounding precincts, the Olympic torch relay, which began in Greece and travelled to Australia via numerous Oceania island nations, and the Sydney Olympic Arts Festival.

=== Phases of the Olympic project ===
The staging of the Olympics were treated as a project on a vast scale, broken into several broad phases:

- 1993 to 1996 – positioning
- 1997 – going operational
- 1998 – procurement/venuisation
- 1999 – testing/refinement
- 2000 – implementation
- 2001 – post-implementation and wind-down

=== SOCOG organisational design ===
The internal organisation of SOCOG evolved over the phases of the project and changed, sometimes radically, several times.

In late 1998, the design was principally functional. The top two tiers below the CEO Sandy Hollway consisted of five groups (managed by Group General Managers and the Deputy CEO) and twenty divisions (managed by divisional General Managers), which in turn were further broken up into programmes and sub-programmes or projects.

In 1999, functional areas (FAs) broke up into geographic precinct and venue teams (managed by Precinct Managers and Venue Managers) with functional area staff reporting to both the FA manager and the venue manager. SOCOG moved to a matrix structure. The Interstate Football division extant in 1998 was the first of these geographically based venue teams.

=== Volunteer program ===
The origins of the volunteer program for Sydney 2000 dates back to the bid, as early as 1992.

On 17 December 1992, a group of Sydney citizens interested in the prospect of hosting the 2000 Olympic and Paralympic Games gathered for a meeting at Sports House at Wentworth Park in Sydney.

In the period leading up to 1999, after Sydney had won the bid, the small group of volunteers grew from approximately 42 to around 500. These volunteers became known as Pioneer Volunteers. The Pioneer Volunteer program was managed internally by SOCOG's Volunteer Services Department in consultation with prominent peak groups like The Centre for Volunteering (Volunteering and TAFE. Some of the Pioneer Volunteers still meet every four months, an unseen legacy of the Games which brought together a community spirit not seen before.

During the Olympic games, tens of thousands of volunteers (the official figure placed at 46,967) helped everywhere at the Olympic venues and elsewhere in the city. They were honoured with a parade like the athletes had a few days before.

=== Venues ===
==== Sydney Olympic Park ====
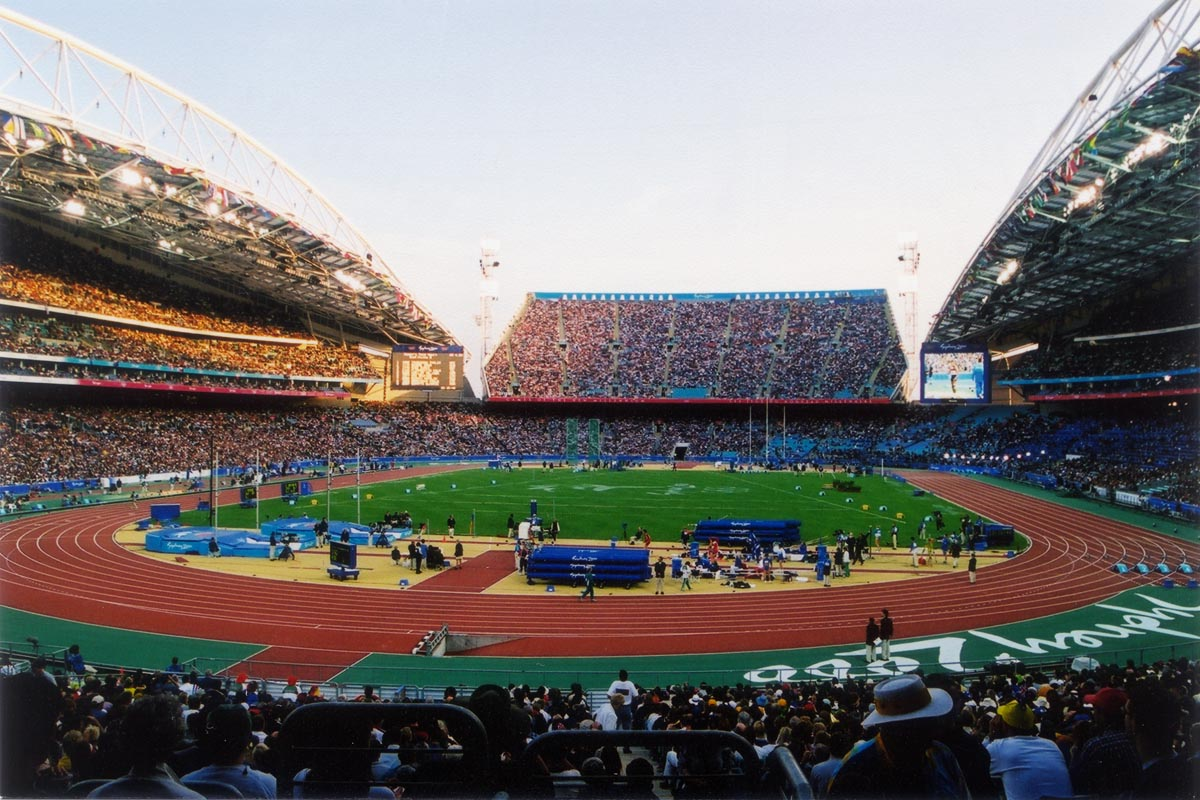
Stadium Australia

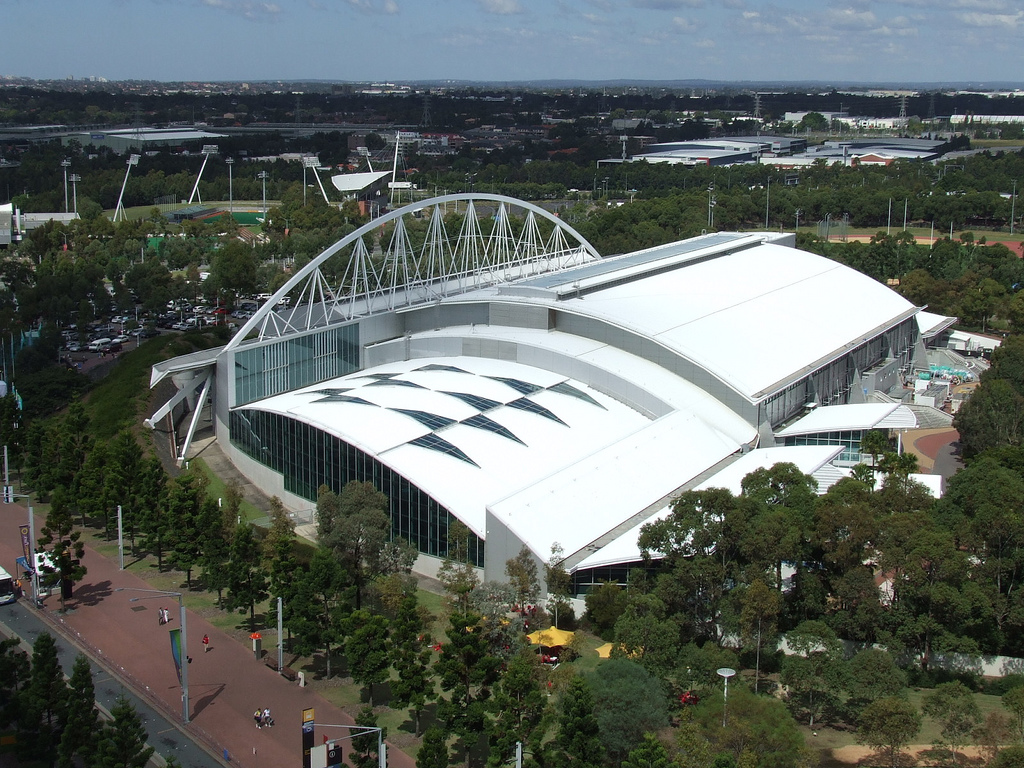
Sydney Olympic Park Aquatic Centre

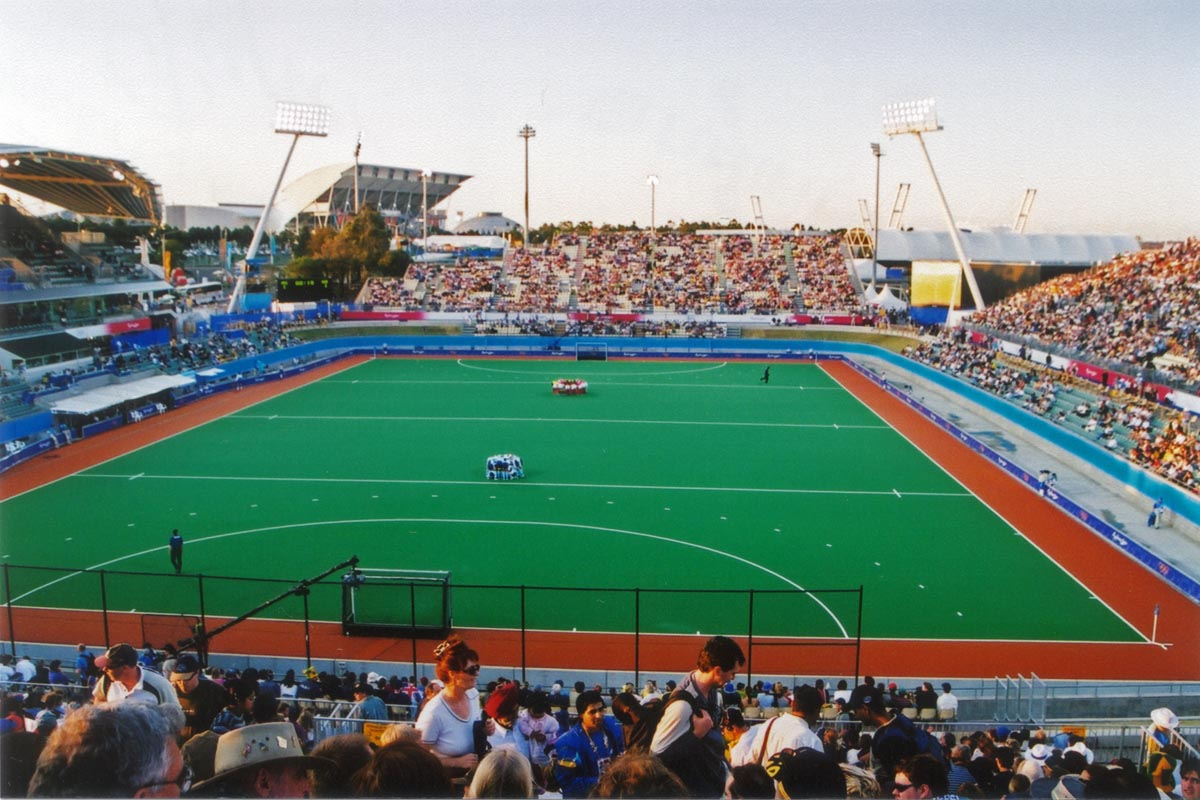
State Hockey Centre

- Stadium Australia: Ceremonies (opening/closing), Athletics, Football (final)
- Sydney International Aquatic Centre: Diving, Modern Pentathlon (swimming) Swimming, Synchronised Swimming, Water Polo (medal events)
- State Sports Centre: Table Tennis, Taekwondo
- NSW Tennis Centre: Tennis
- State Hockey Centre: Field Hockey
- The Dome and Exhibition Complex: Badminton, Basketball, Gymnastics (rhythmic), Handball (final), Modern Pentathlon (fencing, shooting), Volleyball (indoor)
- Sydney SuperDome: Gymnastics (artistic, trampoline), Basketball (final)
- Sydney Baseball Stadium: Baseball, Modern Pentathlon (riding, running)
- Sydney International Archery Park: Archery

==== Sydney ====
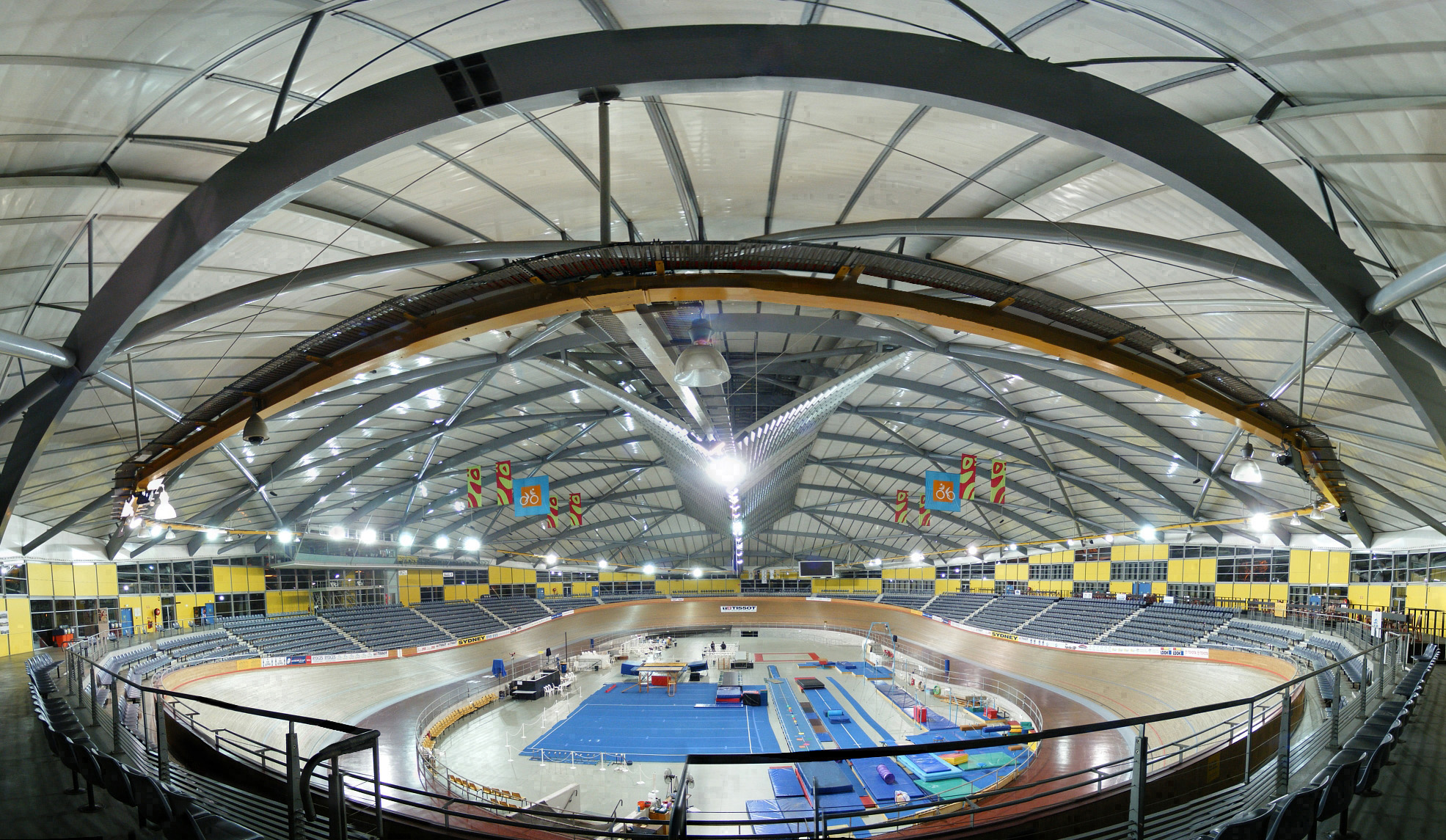
Dunc Gray Velodrome

- Sydney Convention & Exhibition Centre: Boxing, Fencing, Judo, Weightlifting, Wrestling
- Sydney Entertainment Centre: Volleyball (indoor final)
- Dunc Gray Velodrome: Cycling (track)
- Sydney International Shooting Centre: Shooting
- Sydney International Equestrian Centre: Equestrian
- Sydney International Regatta Centre: Rowing, Canoeing (sprint)
- Blacktown Olympic Centre: Baseball, Softball
- Western Sydney Parklands: Cycling (mountain biking)
- Ryde Aquatic Leisure Centre: Water Polo
- Penrith Whitewater Stadium: Canoeing (slalom)
- Bondi Beach: Volleyball (beach)
- Sydney Football Stadium: Football
- Olympic Sailing Shore Base: Sailing
- Centennial Parklands: Cycling (road)
- Marathon course: Athletics (marathon)
- North Sydney: Athletics (marathon start)
- Sydney Opera House: Triathlon.

==== Outside Sydney ====
- Canberra Stadium, Canberra: Football
- Hindmarsh Stadium, Adelaide: Football
- Melbourne Cricket Ground: Football
- The Gabba (Brisbane Cricket Ground), Brisbane: Football

== Sydney Olympic Arts Festival ==
The original festivals in Olympia celebrated both cultural events and physical feats. The tradition continued with the first modern Olympics in 1896, and since then various cultural events have accompanied the sporting competition. Starting with the 1996 Summer Olympics, a cycle of four arts festivals have been staged by each host country. The Sydney Olympic Arts Festival was an arts festival that ran before and during the Olympics. The festival event coordinator was David Gallen.

The first of the four festivals was the first edition of the Festival of the Dreaming, which was founded by artistic director Rhoda Roberts (who later co-directed segments of the Opening Ceremony), was held in 1997, as the first of four leading up to the Sydney Olympics. Some events were held at the Sydney Opera House, and the festival included an Aboriginal cast performing Shakespeare's A Midsummer Night's Dream, as well as Samuel Beckett's Waiting for Godot performed in the Bundjalung language.

The second festival was "A Sea Change", in which artists and companies from Australia and Oceania explored "the influence of the sea on Australian life as a means to explore the changing political and cultural climates in Australia".

The third festival, "Reaching the World" took the form of an international tour, from November 1998 until January 2000, travelling to all five regions represented by the Olympic rings (Europe, Africa, Asia, the Americas, and Oceania) and showcasing Australian culture by means of exhibitions, performances, and various media.

The fourth and final festival, while featuring many international artists and companies, served as a showcase for the diversity and depth of the arts in Australia. Opening four weeks before the Olympic Games, the Sydney 2000 Olympics Arts Festival ran until the last day of athletic competition, from 18 August to 1 October 2000. Starting with an all-day Aboriginal welcoming ceremony, Tubowgule ("the Meeting of the Waters"), choreographed by Stephen Page, began at La Perouse beach near Botany Bay, and concluded at Bennelong Point, in the forecourt of Sydney Opera House. There, contemporary Indigenous dance company Bangarra Dance Theatre performed Energy of Australia. The gala opening event for the festival was the musically pyrotechnical "Symphony of a Thousand" by Mahler at the Sydney SuperDome. The festival included many performing arts events, mostly presented at the Sydney Opera House. Concerts were performed by many orchestras, including Sydney Symphony Orchestra, Orchestra Filarmonica della Scala, the New Zealand Symphony Orchestra, the Melbourne Symphony Orchestra, the Australian Chamber Orchestra, the Asian Youth Orchestra, and the Australian Youth Orchestra, and operas were presented. There were also dance, singing, and drama performances, staged mainly at the Opera House but also at Her Majesty's Theatre and the Capitol Theatre.

== Marketing ==
=== Emblem ===
The overall branding of the Games was designed by Melbourne-based FHA Image Design; the emblem—nicknamed the "Millennium Man"—consists of a stylised, multi-coloured depiction of a torch-bearer in motion, with arms and legs resembling boomerangs, and a smoke trail resembling the roof of the Sydney Opera House (a motif that had also been used in the logo for Sydney's bid). The firm's then-creative director Richard Henderson explained that they aimed for the emblem be simple enough for a child to draw, avoid "quaint", overused imagery such as kangaroos and koalas, and "engender [the] pride in Australian creative quality and optimism for the new millennium that the Games would herald".

=== Mascots ===
The official Olympic mascots chosen for the 2000 Summer Games were Syd the platypus, Millie the echidna, and Olly the kookaburra, designed by Matthew Hattan and Jozef Szekeres and named by Philip Sheldon of agency Weekes Morris Osborn in response to the original SOCOG recommendation of Murray, Margery, and Dawn after famous Australian athletes.

An unofficial alternate mascot—Fatso the Fat-Arsed Wombat—was created by Australian comedians Roy and HG for their miniseries during the Games, The Dream; the character was conceived as a satire of the increasing commercialisation of the Olympics, with the duo often being critical of the official mascots (whom they jokingly nicknamed "Olly, Millie and Dickhead"). Only two plush toys of Fatso were made, one of which was placed in the Olympic Village; the plush was controversially smuggled into a medal ceremony by the Australian men's 4 × 200-metre relay team. The character achieved a cult following, with some Australians preferring Fatso to the actual mascots. One of the Fatso plushes was auctioned for charity following the Games (being sold to Kerry Stokes, an executive of the Seven Network, for A$80,450), while a figure of Fatso was included in an display outside Stadium Australia that commemorated the Games' volunteers.

=== Sponsors ===
Sponsors of the 2000 Summer Olympics
Worldwide Olympic Partners
- Coca-Cola
- IBM
- John Hancock Financial
- Kodak
- McDonald's
- Panasonic
- Samsung Electronics
- Sports Illustrated
- United Parcel Service
- Visa Inc.
- Xerox
Australian Partners
- AMP Limited
- Ansett Australia
- BHP
- EnergyAustralia
- Holden
- News Corp Australia
- Pacific Dunlop
- Seven Network
- Swatch
- Telstra
- University of Fairfax
- Westfield Group
- Westpac
Supporters
- 2UE
- Adecco
- Bonds
- Bonlac
- Boral
- Carlton & United Breweries
- ClubsNSW
- Goodman Fielder
- Nike, Inc.
- Olex Cables
- Perth Mint
- Robert Timms Coffee
- Royal Australian Mint
- Shell plc
- Sleepmaker
- TAFE NSW
- Traveland
- Tyco International
Providers
- Avis Car Rental
- Berkley Challenge Housekeeping Services
- Buspak
- Cadbury
- Citysearch
- Cleanevent
- Clipsal
- Crown Equipment Corporation
- DB Schenker
- Diamond Press
- Frazer Nash
- Garret Metal Detectors
- General Electric
- Generale Location
- George Weston Foods
- Great White Shark Enterprises
- Hamiltons Laboratories
- Harley-Davidson
- Lifeminders.com
- Lindeman's
- Linfox
- LookSmart
- Mistral
- New South Wales Department of Information Technology & Management
- Pacific Waste Management
- Ramler Furniture
- Rogen
- Salomon Brothers
- Saunders Design
- Showpower
- Sonic Healthcare
- Speedo
- Val Morgan
- Visy
- Waste Services NSW
- Woolcott Research
- Woolmark

== Medals and bouquets ==
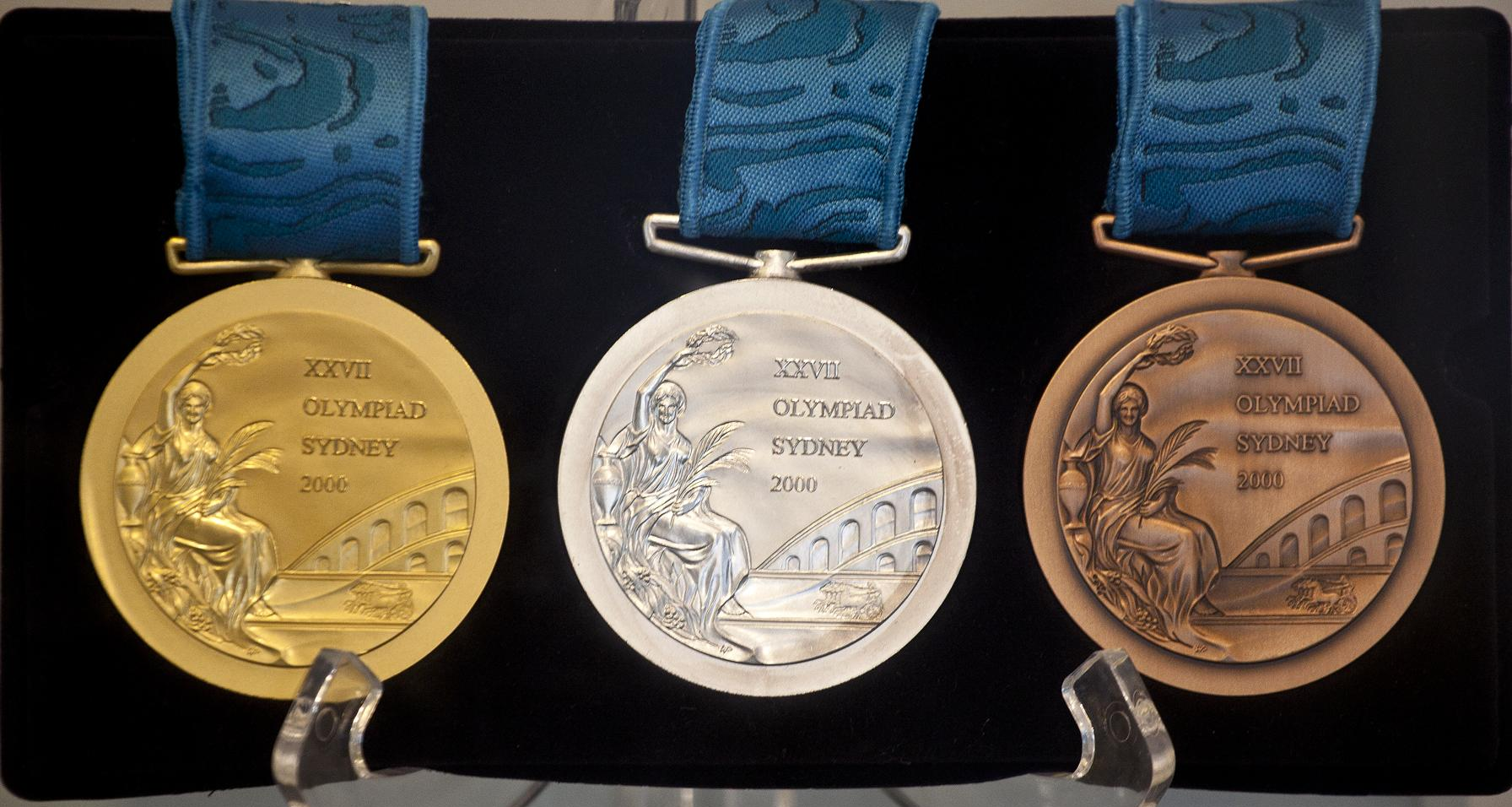
Gold, silver, and bronze medals from the 2000 Summer Olympics

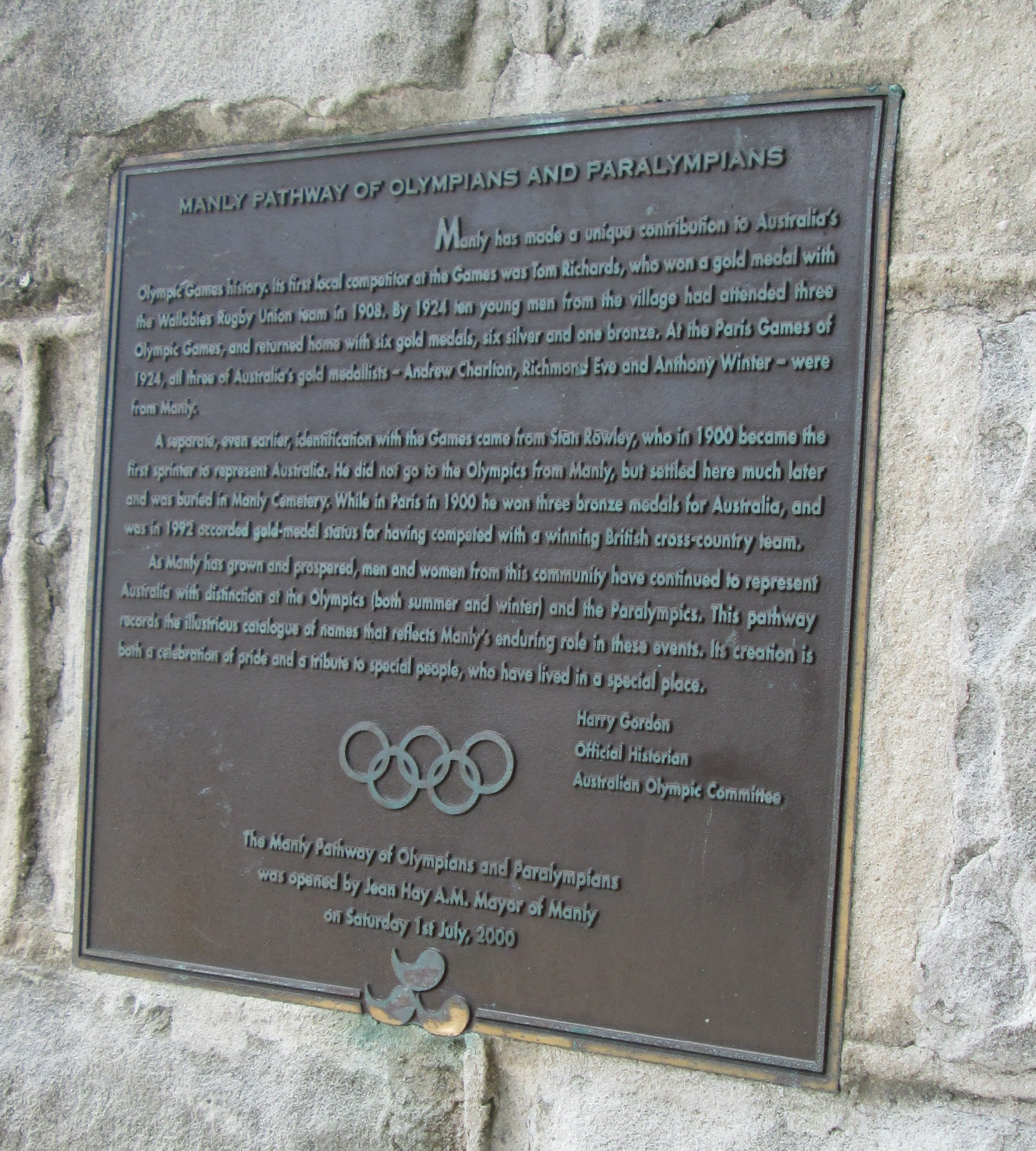
Plaque at Manly NSW dedicated to 2000 Olympics

A total of 750 gold, 750 silver and 780 bronze medals were minted for the Games. The gold and silver medals contained 99.99 percent of pure silver. The bronze medals were 99 percent bronze with one percent silver, they were made by melting down Australian one-cent and two-cent coins, which had been removed from circulation from 1992 onward.

The bouquets handed to medal recipients incorporated foliage from the Grevillea baileyana, also known as the white oak.

== Awards and commendations ==
The International Olympic Committee awarded Sydney and its inhabitants with the "Pierre de Coubertin Trophy" in recognition of the collaboration and happiness shown by the people of Sydney during the event to all the athletes and visitors around the world.

After the Games had ended, the New South Wales Police Force was granted use of the Olympic Rings in a new commendation and citation as the IOC consideration after having staged the "safest" Games ever.

=== Mo Awards ===
The Australian Entertainment Mo Awards (commonly known informally as the Mo Awards), were annual Australian entertainment industry awards. They recognise achievements in live entertainment in Australia from 1975 to 2016.

Year	Nominee / work	Award	Result (wins only)
2000 Summer	Olympic Games Opening Ceremony	Special Event of the Year	Won

== In popular culture ==
- In Tom Clancy's thriller Rainbow Six and its video game adaptation, the 2000 Olympic Games are the setting of a plot by eco-terrorists who plan to spread a deadly biological agent through Stadium Australia's cooling system.
- In Morris Gleitzman's children's book Toad Rage, a cane toad travels to Sydney in a bid to become the Olympic mascot.
- The Games was an ABC mockumentary television series that ran in 1998 and 2000. The series satirised corruption and cronyism in the Olympic movement, bureaucratic ineptness in the New South Wales public service, and unethical behaviour within politics and the media. An unusual feature of the show was that the characters shared the same name as the actors who played them.
- In the universe of the Cyberpunk tabletop role-playing game, the 2000 Olympics were never held due to bankruptcy and a boycott by nations supporting Aboriginal land claims.

== See also ==
- 2000 Summer Paralympics
- Olympic Games held in Australia
  - 1956 Summer Olympics – Melbourne
  - 2000 Summer Olympics – Sydney
  - 2032 Summer Olympics – Brisbane
- List of IOC country codes
- The Games of the XXVII Olympiad 2000: Music from the Opening Ceremony
- Aussie Aussie Aussie, Oi Oi Oi
- John Coates
- Use of performance-enhancing drugs in the Olympic Games – Sydney 2000

== Notes ==
Summer Olympics
Preceded by Atlanta	XXVII Olympiad; Sydney; 2000	Succeeded by Athens
