= List of Pan American Games medalists in table tennis =

This is the complete list of Pan American Games medalists in table tennis from 1979 to 2023.

== Events ==
=== Men's singles ===
Year	Location	Gold	Silver	Bronze
1979	San Juan	Eddie Lo (CAN)	Mario Álvarez (DOM)	Alex Polisois (CAN)
1979	San Juan	Eddie Lo (CAN)	Mario Álvarez (DOM)	Raymundo Fermín (DOM)
1983	Caracas	Brian Masters (USA)	Ricardo Inokuchi (BRA)	Mario Álvarez (DOM)
1983	Caracas	Brian Masters (USA)	Ricardo Inokuchi (BRA)	Walter Nathan (PER)
1987	Indianapolis	Joe Ng (CAN)	Sean O'Neill (USA)	Cláudio Kano (BRA)
1987	Indianapolis	Joe Ng (CAN)	Sean O'Neill (USA)	Carlos Kawai (BRA)
1991	Havana	Hugo Hoyama (BRA)	Cláudio Kano (BRA)	Horatio Pintea (CAN)
1991	Havana	Hugo Hoyama (BRA)	Cláudio Kano (BRA)	James Butler (USA)
1995	Mar del Plata	Hugo Hoyama (BRA)	Cláudio Kano (BRA)	Horatio Pintea (CAN)
1995	Mar del Plata	Hugo Hoyama (BRA)	Cláudio Kano (BRA)	James Butler (USA)
1999	Winnipeg	David Zhuang (USA)	Liu Song (ARG)	Francisco Arado (CUB)
1999	Winnipeg	David Zhuang (USA)	Liu Song (ARG)	Jorge Gambra (CHI)
2003	Santo Domingo	Lin Ju (DOM)	Thiago Monteiro (BRA)	Hugo Hoyama (BRA)
2003	Santo Domingo	Lin Ju (DOM)	Thiago Monteiro (BRA)	Liu Song (ARG)
2007	Rio de Janeiro	Lin Ju (DOM)	Liu Song (ARG)	
2007	Rio de Janeiro	Lin Ju (DOM)	Liu Song (ARG)	Thiago Monteiro (BRA)
2011	Guadalajara	Liu Song (ARG)	Marcos Madrid (MEX)	Alberto Miño (ECU)
2011	Guadalajara	Liu Song (ARG)	Marcos Madrid (MEX)	Lin Ju (DOM)
2015	Toronto	Hugo Calderano (BRA)	Gustavo Tsuboi (BRA)	Thiago Monteiro (BRA)
2015	Toronto	Hugo Calderano (BRA)	Gustavo Tsuboi (BRA)	Eugene Wang (CAN)
2019	Lima	Hugo Calderano (BRA)	Jiaji Wu (DOM)	Eugene Wang (CAN)
2019	Lima	Hugo Calderano (BRA)	Jiaji Wu (DOM)	Kanak Jha (USA)
2023	Santiago	Hugo Calderano (BRA)	Andy Pereira (CUB)	Eugene Wang (CAN)
2023	Santiago	Hugo Calderano (BRA)	Andy Pereira (CUB)	Marcos Madrid (MEX)

=== Men's doubles ===
Year	Location	Gold	Silver	Bronze
1979	San Juan	Eddie Lo (Canada) Alex Polisois (CAN)	Mario Álvarez (Dominican Republic) Esteban Ortiz Gonzalo (DOM)	Raymundo Fermín (Dominican Republic) Juan Vila (DOM)
1979	San Juan	Eddie Lo (Canada) Alex Polisois (CAN)	Mario Álvarez (Dominican Republic) Esteban Ortiz Gonzalo (DOM)	Gustavo Ripalda (Ecuador) Gustavo Ulloa (ECU)
1983	Caracas	Ricardo Inokuchi (Brazil) Cláudio Kano (BRA)	Raymundo Fermín (Dominican Republic) Juan Vila (DOM)	Brian Masters (United States) Sean O'Neill (USA)
1983	Caracas	Ricardo Inokuchi (Brazil) Cláudio Kano (BRA)	Raymundo Fermín (Dominican Republic) Juan Vila (DOM)	Marcos Núñez (Chile) Jorge Gambra (CHI)
1987	Indianapolis	Joe Ng (Canada) Horatio Pintea (CAN)	Cláudio Kano (Brazil) Hugo Hoyama (BRA)	Marcos Núñez (Chile) Jorge Gambra (CHI)
1987	Indianapolis	Joe Ng (Canada) Horatio Pintea (CAN)	Cláudio Kano (Brazil) Hugo Hoyama (BRA)	Mario Álvarez (Dominican Republic) Juan Vila (DOM)
1991	Havana	Cláudio Kano (Brazil) Hugo Hoyama (BRA)	Joe Ng (Canada) Horatio Pintea (CAN)	Carlos Kawai (Brazil) Silney Yuta (BRA)
1991	Havana	Cláudio Kano (Brazil) Hugo Hoyama (BRA)	Joe Ng (Canada) Horatio Pintea (CAN)	Rubén Arado (Cuba) Ernesto González (CUB)
1995	Mar del Plata	Cláudio Kano (Brazil) Hugo Hoyama (BRA)	Pablo Tabachnik (Argentina) Martin Paradela (ARG)	Joe Ng (Canada) Horatio Pintea (CAN)
1995	Mar del Plata	Cláudio Kano (Brazil) Hugo Hoyama (BRA)	Pablo Tabachnik (Argentina) Martin Paradela (ARG)	Juan Papic (Chile) Juan Salamanca (CHI)
2003	Santo Domingo	Hugo Hoyama (Brazil) Thiago Monteiro (BRA)	Gustavo Tsuboi (Brazil) Bruno Anjos (BRA)	Liu Song (Argentina) Pablo Tabachnik (ARG)
2003	Santo Domingo	Hugo Hoyama (Brazil) Thiago Monteiro (BRA)	Gustavo Tsuboi (Brazil) Bruno Anjos (BRA)	Lin Ju (Dominican Republic) Roberto Brito (DOM)
2019	Lima	Hugo Calderano (Brazil) Gustavo Tsuboi (BRA)	Gastón Alto (Argentina) Horacio Cifuentes (ARG)	Brian Afanador (Puerto Rico) Daniel González (PUR)
2019	Lima	Hugo Calderano (Brazil) Gustavo Tsuboi (BRA)	Gastón Alto (Argentina) Horacio Cifuentes (ARG)	Emil Santos (Dominican Republic) Jiaji Wu (DOM)
2023	Santiago	Jorge Campos (Cuba) Andy Pereira (CUB)	Hugo Calderano (Brazil) Vitor Ishiy (BRA)	Horacio Cifuentes (Argentina) Gastón Alto (ARG)
2023	Santiago	Jorge Campos (Cuba) Andy Pereira (CUB)	Hugo Calderano (Brazil) Vitor Ishiy (BRA)	Gustavo Gómez (Chile) Nicolás Burgos (CHI)

=== Men's team ===
Year	Location	Gold	Silver	Bronze
1979	San Juan	Dominican Republic; Mario Álvarez; Raymundo Fermín; Esteban Ortiz; Juan Vila	United States; Quang Dang Bui; David Sakai; Dean Doyle; Todd Petersen	Canada; Eddie Lo; Alex Polisois
1983	Caracas	Brazil; Ricardo Inokuchi; Cláudio Kano; Acassio da Cunha; Aristides Nascimento; Maurício Kobayashi	Canada; Joe Ng; Horatio Pintea; Bao Nguyen; Alain Bourbonnais	Dominican Republic; Mario Álvarez; Raymundo Fermín; Juan Vila; Gonzalo Ortiz
1983	Caracas	Brazil; Ricardo Inokuchi; Cláudio Kano; Acassio da Cunha; Aristides Nascimento; Maurício Kobayashi	Canada; Joe Ng; Horatio Pintea; Bao Nguyen; Alain Bourbonnais	Jamaica
1987	Indianapolis	Brazil; Cláudio Kano; Hugo Hoyama; Carlos Kawai	United States; James Butler; Khoa Nguyen; Sean O'Neill; Quang Bui	Canada; Joe Ng; Horatio Pintea; Cristopher Chu
1991	Havana	Brazil; Cláudio Kano; Hugo Hoyama; Carlos Kawai; Silnei Yuta	United States; James Butler; Sean O'Neill; Dhirem Narotam; Chi-Sun Chui	Canada; Joe Ng; Horatio Pintea; Francis Trudel; Come-Vincent Bernier
1995	Mar del Plata	Brazil; Cláudio Kano; Hugo Hoyama; Carlos Kawai; Silnei Yuta	United States; James Butler; Sean O'Neill; Chi-Sun Chui; Derek May	Canada; Joe Ng; Horatio Pintea; Francis Trudel; D. Su
1999	Winnipeg	United States; David Zhuang; Eric Owens; Todd Sweeris	Argentina; Liu Song; Pablo Tabachnik; Juan Frery	Brazil; Hugo Hoyama; Thiago Monteiro; Carlos Kawai
1999	Winnipeg	United States; David Zhuang; Eric Owens; Todd Sweeris	Argentina; Liu Song; Pablo Tabachnik; Juan Frery	Canada; Pradeeban Peter-Paul; Xavier Therien; Horatio Pintea
2007	Rio de Janeiro	Brazil; Hugo Hoyama; Thiago Monteiro; Gustavo Tsuboi	Argentina; Liu Song; Pablo Tabachnik; Gastón Alto	Canada; Pierre-Luc Hinse; Shen Qiang; Pradeeban Peter-Paul
2007	Rio de Janeiro	Brazil; Hugo Hoyama; Thiago Monteiro; Gustavo Tsuboi	Argentina; Liu Song; Pablo Tabachnik; Gastón Alto	United States; Mark Hazinski; Eric Owens; Han Xiao
2011	Guadalajara	Brazil; Hugo Hoyama; Thiago Monteiro; Gustavo Tsuboi	Argentina; Liu Song; Pablo Tabachnik; Gastón Alto	Cuba; Andy Pereira; Jorge Campos; Pavel Oxamendi
2011	Guadalajara	Brazil; Hugo Hoyama; Thiago Monteiro; Gustavo Tsuboi	Argentina; Liu Song; Pablo Tabachnik; Gastón Alto	Mexico; Marcos Madrid; Guillermo Muñoz; Jude Okoh
2015	Toronto	Brazil; Hugo Calderano; Thiago Monteiro; Gustavo Tsuboi	Paraguay; Marcelo Aguirre; Axel Gavilan; Alejandro Toranzos	Canada; Marko Medjugorak; Pierre-Luc Thériault; Eugene Wang
2015	Toronto	Brazil; Hugo Calderano; Thiago Monteiro; Gustavo Tsuboi	Paraguay; Marcelo Aguirre; Axel Gavilan; Alejandro Toranzos	Puerto Rico; Brian Afanador; Héctor Berríos; Daniel González
2019	Lima	United States; Kanak Jha; Nikhil Kumar; Nicholas Tio	Argentina; Gastón Alto; Horacio Cifuentes; Pablo Tabachnik	Brazil; Hugo Calderano; Eric Jouti; Gustavo Tsuboi
2019	Lima	United States; Kanak Jha; Nikhil Kumar; Nicholas Tio	Argentina; Gastón Alto; Horacio Cifuentes; Pablo Tabachnik	Cuba; Jorge Campos; Liván Martínez; Andy Pereira
2023	Santiago	Brazil; Hugo Calderano; Vitor Ishiy; Eric Jouti	Canada; Eugene Wang; Edward Ly; Siméon Martin	Argentina; Gastón Alto; Horácio Cifuentes; Santiago Lorenzo
2023	Santiago	Brazil; Hugo Calderano; Vitor Ishiy; Eric Jouti	Canada; Eugene Wang; Edward Ly; Siméon Martin	United States; Jishan Liang; Nandan Naresh; Siddhartha Naresh

=== Women's singles ===
Year	Location	Gold	Silver	Bronze
1979	San Juan	Mariann Domonkos (CAN)	Faan Yeen Liu (USA)	Diana Guillen (MEX)
1979	San Juan	Mariann Domonkos (CAN)	Faan Yeen Liu (USA)	Judy Bochenski (USA)
1983	Caracas	Insook Bhushan (USA)	Madeleine Armas (CUB)	Elizabeth Popper (VEN)
1983	Caracas	Insook Bhushan (USA)	Madeleine Armas (CUB)	Marta Báez (CUB)
1987	Indianapolis	Insook Bhushan (USA)	Mariann Domonkos (CAN)	Mónica Liyau (PER)
1987	Indianapolis	Insook Bhushan (USA)	Mariann Domonkos (CAN)	Carmen Miranda Yera (CUB)
1991	Havana	Insook Bhushan (USA)	Lily Yip (USA)	Madeleine Armas (CUB)
1991	Havana	Insook Bhushan (USA)	Lily Yip (USA)	Jacqueline Díaz (CHI)
1995	Mar del Plata	Geng Lijuan (CAN)	Lily Yip (USA)	Barbara Chiu (CAN)
1995	Mar del Plata	Geng Lijuan (CAN)	Lily Yip (USA)	Diana Gee (USA)
1999	Winnipeg	Gao Jun (USA)	Geng Lijuan (CAN)	Petra Cada (CAN)
1999	Winnipeg	Gao Jun (USA)	Geng Lijuan (CAN)	Amy Feng (USA)
2003	Santo Domingo	Gao Jun (USA)	Wu Xue (DOM)	Tawny Banh (USA)
2003	Santo Domingo	Gao Jun (USA)	Wu Xue (DOM)	Berta Rodríguez (CHI)
2007	Rio de Janeiro	Gao Jun (USA)	Wu Xue (DOM)	Wang Chen (USA)
2007	Rio de Janeiro	Gao Jun (USA)	Wu Xue (DOM)	Judy Long (CAN)
2011	Guadalajara	Zhang Mo (CAN)	Wu Xue (DOM)	Lily Zhang (USA)
2011	Guadalajara	Zhang Mo (CAN)	Wu Xue (DOM)	Ariel Hsing (USA)
2015	Toronto	Jennifer Wu (USA)	Gui Lin (BRA)	Caroline Kumahara (BRA)
2015	Toronto	Jennifer Wu (USA)	Gui Lin (BRA)	Lily Zhang (USA)
2019	Lima	Adriana Díaz (PUR)	Jennifer Wu (USA)	Melanie Díaz (PUR)
2019	Lima	Adriana Díaz (PUR)	Jennifer Wu (USA)	Bruna Takahashi (BRA)
2023	Santiago	Adriana Díaz (PUR)	Bruna Takahashi (BRA)	Zhang Mo (CAN)
2023	Santiago	Adriana Díaz (PUR)	Bruna Takahashi (BRA)	Lily Zhang (USA)

=== Women's doubles ===
Year	Location	Gold	Silver	Bronze
1979	San Juan	Mariann Domonkos (Canada) Biurte Plucas (CAN)	Judy Bochenski (United States) Connie Sweeris (USA)	Ana Uribe (Colombia) Isabel Bastida (COL)
1979	San Juan	Mariann Domonkos (Canada) Biurte Plucas (CAN)	Judy Bochenski (United States) Connie Sweeris (USA)	Paquita Roman (Puerto Rico) Ailed Gonzalez (PUR)
1983	Caracas	Insook Bhushan (United States) Diana Gee (USA)	Madeleine Armas (Cuba) Marta Báez (CUB)	Elizabeth Popper (Venezuela) Nieves Arevalo (VEN)
1983	Caracas	Insook Bhushan (United States) Diana Gee (USA)	Madeleine Armas (Cuba) Marta Báez (CUB)	Mariann Domonkos (Canada) Thanh Mach (CAN)
1987	Indianapolis	Carmen Miranda Yera (Cuba) Marisel Ramírez (CUB)	Mariann Domonkos (Canada) Thanh Mach (CAN)	Madeleine Armas (Cuba) Marta Báez (CUB)
1987	Indianapolis	Carmen Miranda Yera (Cuba) Marisel Ramírez (CUB)	Mariann Domonkos (Canada) Thanh Mach (CAN)	Patricia Cabrera (Ecuador) Betty Guamancera (ECU)
1991	Havana	Lily Yip (United States) Li Ai (USA)	Insook Bhushan (United States) Diana Gee (USA)	Madeleine Armas (Cuba) Yolanda Rodríguez (CUB)
1991	Havana	Lily Yip (United States) Li Ai (USA)	Insook Bhushan (United States) Diana Gee (USA)	Julie Barton (Canada) Caroline Sylvestre (CAN)
1995	Mar del Plata	Geng Lijuan (Canada) Barbara Chiu (CAN)	Sofija Tepes (Chile) Jacqueline Díaz (CHI)	Tawny Banh (United States) Wei Wang (USA)
1995	Mar del Plata	Geng Lijuan (Canada) Barbara Chiu (CAN)	Sofija Tepes (Chile) Jacqueline Díaz (CHI)	Berta Rodríguez (Chile) Ursula Macaya (CHI)
2003	Santo Domingo	Gao Jun (United States) Jasna Fazlić (USA)	Lily Yip (United States) Tawny Banh (USA)	Fabiola Ramos (Venezuela) Luisana Pérez (VEN)
2003	Santo Domingo	Gao Jun (United States) Jasna Fazlić (USA)	Lily Yip (United States) Tawny Banh (USA)	Wu Xue (Dominican Republic) Olga Vila (DOM)
2019	Lima	Adriana Díaz (Puerto Rico) Melanie Díaz (PUR)	Jennifer Wu (United States) Lily Zhang (USA)	Alicia Côté (Canada) Zhang Mo (CAN)
2019	Lima	Adriana Díaz (Puerto Rico) Melanie Díaz (PUR)	Jennifer Wu (United States) Lily Zhang (USA)	Bruna Takahashi (Brazil) Jéssica Yamada (BRA)
2023	Santiago	Amy Wang (United States) Rachel Sung (USA)	Giulia Takahashi (Brazil) Bruna Takahashi (BRA)	Paulina Vega (Chile) Daniela Gómez (CHI)
2023	Santiago	Amy Wang (United States) Rachel Sung (USA)	Giulia Takahashi (Brazil) Bruna Takahashi (BRA)	Adriana Díaz (Puerto Rico) Melanie Díaz (PUR)

=== Women's team ===
Year	Location	Gold	Silver	Bronze
1979	San Juan	Canada; Mariann Domonkos; Biurte Plucas	United States; Faan Yeen Liu; Judy Bochenski; Connie Sweeris	Trinidad and Tobago; Nadira Abdool; Tara Hansrajsingh
1983	Caracas	United States; Insook Bhushan; Diana Gee	Cuba; Madeleine Armas; Marta Báez; Carmem Miranda Yera	Canada; Mariann Domonkos; Thanh Mach; Gloria Hsu
1983	Caracas	United States; Insook Bhushan; Diana Gee	Cuba; Madeleine Armas; Marta Báez; Carmem Miranda Yera	Dominican Republic; Blanca Alejo; Brigida Perez
1987	Indianapolis	United States; Insook Bhushan; Diana Gee; Lisa Gee; Takako Tren Holme	Cuba; Madeleine Armas; Marta Báez; Carmem Miranda Yera; Marisel Ramírez	Canada; Mariann Domonkos; Thanh Mach; Helene Bedard
1991	Havana	United States; Insook Bhushan; Diana Gee; Lily Yip; Li Ai	Cuba; Madeleine Armas; Yolanda Rodríguez; Leticia Suárez; Marisel Ramírez	Brazil; Carla Tibério; Lyanne Kosaka; Marta Massuda; Mônica Dotti
1995	Mar del Plata	Canada; Geng Lijuan; Barbara Chiu; Chris Xu; Petra Cada	United States; Diana Gee; Lily Yip; Tawny Banh; Wei Wang	Cuba; Madeleine Armas; Yolaisdis García; Marisel Ramírez; Yolanda Rodríguez
1999	Winnipeg	United States; Gao Jun; Tawny Banh; Amy Feng	Canada; Geng Lijuan; Chris Xu; Petra Cada	Brazil; Eugênia Ferreira; Lígia Silva; Lyanne Kosaka
1999	Winnipeg	United States; Gao Jun; Tawny Banh; Amy Feng	Canada; Geng Lijuan; Chris Xu; Petra Cada	Chile; Berta Rodríguez; Sofija Tepes; Silvia Morel
2007	Rio de Janeiro	United States; Gao Jun; Wang Chen; Tawny Banh	Canada; Judy Long; Zhang Mo; Chris Xu	Cuba; Glendys Gonzalez; Dayana Ferrer; Anisleyvis Bereau
2007	Rio de Janeiro	United States; Gao Jun; Wang Chen; Tawny Banh	Canada; Judy Long; Zhang Mo; Chris Xu	Dominican Republic; Johenny Valdez; Wu Xue; Lian Qian
2011	Guadalajara	Dominican Republic; Wu Xue; Johenny Valdez; Eva Brito	Venezuela; Fabiola Ramos; Ruaida Ezzeddine; Luisana Pérez	United States; Ariel Hsing; Lily Zhang; Erica Wu
2011	Guadalajara	Dominican Republic; Wu Xue; Johenny Valdez; Eva Brito	Venezuela; Fabiola Ramos; Ruaida Ezzeddine; Luisana Pérez	Colombia; Paula Medina; Luisa Zuluaga; Johana Araque
2015	Toronto	United States; Lily Zhang; Jennifer Wu; Zheng Jiaqi	Brazil; Gui Lin; Caroline Kumahara; Lígia Silva	Canada; Alicia Cote; Anqi Luo; Zhang Mo
2015	Toronto	United States; Lily Zhang; Jennifer Wu; Zheng Jiaqi	Brazil; Gui Lin; Caroline Kumahara; Lígia Silva	Puerto Rico; Carelyn Cordero; Adriana Díaz; Melanie Díaz
2019	Lima	Puerto Rico; Adriana Díaz; Melanie Díaz; Daniely Ríos	Brazil; Caroline Kumahara; Bruna Takahashi; Jéssica Yamada	Canada; Alicia Côté; Ivy Liao; Zhang Mo
2019	Lima	Puerto Rico; Adriana Díaz; Melanie Díaz; Daniely Ríos	Brazil; Caroline Kumahara; Bruna Takahashi; Jéssica Yamada	United States; Amy Wang; Jennifer Wu; Lily Zhang
2023	Santiago	United States; Lily Zhang; Amy Wang; Rachel Sung	Puerto Rico; Adriana Diaz; Melanie Diaz; Brianna Burgos	Brazil; Bruna Takahashi; Giulia Takahashi; Bruna Alexandre
2023	Santiago	United States; Lily Zhang; Amy Wang; Rachel Sung	Puerto Rico; Adriana Diaz; Melanie Diaz; Brianna Burgos	Chile; Paulina Vega; Daniela Ortega; Zhiying Zeng

=== Mixed doubles ===
Year	Location	Gold	Silver	Bronze
1979	San Juan	Alex Polisois (Canada) Mariann Domonkos (CAN)	Sergio Sanchez (Mexico) Diana Guillen (MEX)	Eddie Lo (Canada) Biurte Plucas (CAN)
1979	San Juan	Alex Polisois (Canada) Mariann Domonkos (CAN)	Sergio Sanchez (Mexico) Diana Guillen (MEX)	Bui Quang Dang (United States) Faan Yeen Liu (USA)
1983	Caracas	Sean O'Neill (United States) Insook Bhushan (USA)	Horatio Pintea (Canada) Mariann Domonkos (CAN)	Cláudio Kano (Brazil) Sandra Noda (BRA)
1983	Caracas	Sean O'Neill (United States) Insook Bhushan (USA)	Horatio Pintea (Canada) Mariann Domonkos (CAN)	Francisco Lopez (Venezuela) Elizabeth Popper (VEN)
1987	Indianapolis	Khoa Nguyen (United States) Insook Bhushan (USA)	Sean O'Neill (United States) Diana Gee (USA)	Joe Ng (Canada) Mariann Domonkos (CAN)
1987	Indianapolis	Khoa Nguyen (United States) Insook Bhushan (USA)	Sean O'Neill (United States) Diana Gee (USA)	Francisco Lopez (Venezuela) Elizabeth Popper (VEN)
1991	Havana	Sean O'Neill (United States) Diana Gee (USA)	Elizabeth Popper (Venezuela) Nestor Pérez (VEN)	Juan Papic (Chile) Sofija Tepes (CHI)
1991	Havana	Sean O'Neill (United States) Diana Gee (USA)	Elizabeth Popper (Venezuela) Nestor Pérez (VEN)	Walter Nathan (Peru) Magaly Montes (PER)
1995	Mar del Plata	Horatio Pintea (Canada) Geng Lijuan (CAN)	Francisco Arado (Cuba) Madeleine Armas (CUB)	Hugo Hoyama (Brazil) Lívia Kosaka (BRA)
1995	Mar del Plata	Horatio Pintea (Canada) Geng Lijuan (CAN)	Francisco Arado (Cuba) Madeleine Armas (CUB)	Joe Ng (Canada) Barbara Chiu (CAN)
2019	Lima	Eugene Wang (Canada) Zhang Mo (CAN)	Gustavo Tsuboi (Brazil) Bruna Takahashi (BRA)	Kanak Jha (United States) Jennifer Wu (USA)
2019	Lima	Eugene Wang (Canada) Zhang Mo (CAN)	Gustavo Tsuboi (Brazil) Bruna Takahashi (BRA)	Brian Afanador (Puerto Rico) Adriana Díaz (PUR)
2023	Santiago	Daniela Fonseca (Cuba) Jorge Campos (CUB)	Bruna Takahashi (Brazil) Vitor Ishiy (BRA)	Paulina Vega (Chile) Nicolás Burgos (CHI)
2023	Santiago	Daniela Fonseca (Cuba) Jorge Campos (CUB)	Bruna Takahashi (Brazil) Vitor Ishiy (BRA)	Eugene Wang (Canada) Zhang Mo (CAN)
