= Latin American Table Tennis Championships =

The Latin American Table Tennis Championships is a table tennis tournament for Latin America. It was first held in 1978 in Mexico City. The second edition was held in 1980 in Rio de Janeiro. After these two editions the Latin American Championships were suspended till 1989. Between 1989 and 1992, the tournament was held every year. Between 1994 and 2000, the tournament was held every two years (in the even years). Since 2001 the tournament has been held annually. Since its first edition the tournament has included seven competitions; namely, men's single, double and team; women's single, double and team; and mixed doubles.

== Results ==
Year	City	Team		Single		Double		
Year	City	Men's	Women's	Men's	Women's	Men's	Women's	Mixed
2018	Havana	Brazil	Brazil	(Brazil) Eric Jouti	(Brazil) Bruna Takahashi	(Cuba) Andy Pereira (Cuba) Jorge Campos	(Chile) Paulina Vega (Chile) Judith Morales	(Brazil) Eric Jouti (Brazil) Gui Lin
2016	San Juan	Brazil	Brazil	(Brazil) Hugo Calderano	(Brazil) Gui Lin	(Argentina) Gaston Alto (Argentina) Pablo Tabachnik	(Venezuela) Gremlis Arvelo (Venezuela) Neridee Nino	(Brazil) Vitor Ishiy (Brazil) Caroline Kumahara
2015	Buenos Aires	Brazil	Brazil	(Brazil) Hugo Calderano	(Brazil) Gui Lin	(Chile) Manuel Moya (Chile) Alejandro Rodriguez	(Brazil) Gui Lin (Brazil) Lígia Silva	(Mexico) Marcos Madrid (Mexico) Yadira Silva
2014	Santo Domingo	Brazil	Brazil	(Brazil) Hugo Calderano	(Brazil) Lígia Silva	(Argentina) Gastón Alto (Argentina) Pablo Tabachnik	(Brazil) Lígia Silva (Brazil) Jessica Yamada	(Mexico) Marcos Madrid (Mexico) Yadira Silva
2013	San Salvador	Brazil	Brazil	(Paraguay) Marcelo Aguirre	(Brazil) Caroline Kumahara	(Argentina) Rodrigo Gilabert (Argentina) Diego Temperley	(Chile) Judith Morales (Chile) Paulina Vega	(Brazil) Eric Jouti (Brazil) Caroline Kumahara
2012	Rio de Janeiro	Brazil	Brazil	(Dominican Republic) Lin Ju	(Brazil) Jessica Yamada	Not held		
2011	Guadalajara	Brazil	Venezuela	(Dominican Republic) Lin Ju	(Dominican Republic) Wu Xue	(Argentina) Gastón Alto (Argentina) Liu Song	(Brazil) Lígia Silva (Brazil) Jessica Yamada	(Brazil) Cazuo Matsumoto (Brazil) Lígia Silva
2010	Cancún	Brazil	Brazil	(Argentina) Liu Song	(Mexico) Yadira Silva	(Brazil) Hugo Hoyama (Brazil) Cazuo Matsumoto	(Venezuela) Fabiola Ramos (Venezuela) Ruaida Ezzedinne	(Brazil) Cazuo Matsumoto (Brazil) Lígia Silva
2009	San Salvador	Brazil	Chile	(Brazil) Cazuo Matsumoto	(Brazil) Lígia Silva	(Brazil) Hugo Hoyama (Brazil) Cazuo Matsumoto	(Brazil) Lígia Silva (Brazil) Mariany Nonaka	(Brazil) Cazuo Matsumoto (Brazil) Lígia Silva
2008	Santo Domingo	Brazil	(Dominican Republic) Dominican Republic	(Brazil) Thiago Monteiro	(Dominican Republic) Wu Xue	(Argentina) Liu Song (Argentina) Pablo Tabachnik	(Dominican Republic) Wu Xue (Dominican Republic) Lian Qian	(Dominican Republic) Lin Ju (Dominican Republic) Wu Xue
2007	Guarulhos	Brazil	Brazil	(Argentina) Liu Song	(Dominican Republic) Wu Xue	(Brazil) Hugo Hoyama (Brazil) Thiago Monteiro	(Venezuela) Luisana Pérez (Venezuela) Fabiola Ramos	(Dominican Republic) Lin Ju (Dominican Republic) Wu Xue
2006	Medellín	Argentina	Brazil	(Argentina) Liu Song	(Brazil) Lígia Silva	(Brazil) Hugo Hoyama (Brazil) Thiago Monteiro	(Chile) Berta Rodríguez (Chile) Ximena Cerón	(Brazil) Thiago Monteiro (Brazil) Lígia Silva
2005	Punta del Este	Brazil	Brazil	(Dominican Republic) Lin Ju	(Dominican Republic) Lian Qian	(Argentina) Liu Song (Argentina) Pablo Tabachnik	(Brazil) Lígia Silva (Brazil) Karin Sako	(Dominican Republic) Lin Ju (Dominican Republic) Lian Qian
2004	Valdivia	Brazil	Chile	(Brazil) Thiago Monteiro	(Dominican Republic) Wu Xue	(Argentina) Liu Song (Argentina) Pablo Tabachnik	(Peru) Eliana González (Peru) Marisol Espineira	(Brazil) Hugo Hoyama (Brazil) Mariany Nonaka
2003	El Salvador	Not held		(Argentina) Liu Song	(Venezuela) Fabiola Ramos	(Brazil) Hugo Hoyama (Brazil) Thiago Monteiro	(Chile) Berta Rodríguez (Chile) Sofija Tepes	Not held
2002	Santo Domingo	Brazil	Chile	(Brazil) Hugo Hoyama	(Chile) Berta Rodríguez	(Brazil) Hugo Hoyama (Brazil) Thiago Monteiro	(Chile) Berta Rodríguez (Chile) Sofija Tepes	(Chile) Juan Papic (Chile) Sofija Tepes
2001	Guatemala City	Chile	Chile	(Chile) Augusto Morales	(Chile) Berta Rodríguez	(Chile) Augusto Morales (Chile) Alejandro Rodríguez	(Chile) Silvia Morel (Chile) Sofija Tepes	(Chile) Juan Papic (Chile) Sofija Tepes
2000	Coquimbo	Brazil	Cuba	(Brazil) Hugo Hoyama	(Cuba) Leticia Suárez	(Brazil) Hugo Hoyama (Brazil) Thiago Monteiro	(Cuba) Marisel Ramírez (Cuba) Leticia Suárez	(Brazil) Hugo Hoyama (Brazil) Eugênia Ferreira
1998	Mexico City	Chile	Brazil	(Argentina) Liu Song	(Chile) Sofija Tepes	(Brazil) Hugo Hoyama (Brazil) Carlos Kawai	(Brazil) Monica Doti (Brazil) Lyanne Kosaka	(Chile) Juan Salamanca (Chile) Berta Rodríguez
1996	Mexico City	Chile	Brazil	(Brazil) Hugo Hoyama	(Brazil) Lyanne Kosaka	(Brazil) Hugo Hoyama (Brazil) Giuliano Peixoto	(Brazil) Monica Doti (Brazil) Lyanne Kosaka	(Chile) Juan Papic (Chile) Sofija Tepes
1994	Sancti Spiritus	Brazil	Cuba	(Brazil) Hugo Hoyama	(Cuba) Madeleine Armas	(Brazil) Hugo Hoyama (Brazil) Claudio Kano	(Cuba) Madeleine Armas (Cuba) Yolanda Rodríguez	(Cuba) Francisco Arado (Cuba) Madeleine Armas
1992	Havana	Cuba	Cuba	(Brazil) Hugo Hoyama	(Cuba) Yolanda Rodríguez	(Cuba) Rubén Arado (Cuba) Santiago Roque	(Venezuela) Nelsy Aparicio (Venezuela) Aura Prieto	(Cuba) Rubén Arado (Cuba) Yolanda Rodríguez
1991	Camagüey	Cuba	Cuba	(Brazil) Claudio Kano	(Cuba) Yolanda Rodríguez	(Cuba) Rubén Arado (Cuba) Ernesto González	(Cuba) Madeleine Armas (Cuba) Yolanda Rodríguez	(Cuba) Rubén Arado (Cuba) Yolanda Rodríguez
1990	Sancti Spiritus	Brazil	Cuba	(Brazil) Claudio Kano	(Cuba) Madeleine Armas	(Chile) Jorge Gambra (Chile) Marcos Núñez	(Cuba) Madeleine Armas (Cuba) Yolanda Rodríguez	(Cuba) Ernesto González (Cuba) Madeleine Armas
1989	Las Tunas	Chile	Cuba	(Brazil) Claudio Kano	(Cuba) Madeleine Armas	(Chile) Jorge Gambra (Chile) Marcos Núñez	(Cuba) Carmem Yera (Cuba) Marisel Ramírez	(Cuba) Raúl Betancourt (Cuba) Madeleine Armas
1980	Rio de Janeiro	Brazil	Mexico	(Brazil) Ricardo Inokuchi	(Mexico) Diana Guillén	(Dominican Republic) Raymundo Fermín (Dominican Republic) Juan Vila Reinoso	(Peru) Mónica Liyau (Peru) Patricia Moreno	(Brazil) Acassio da Cunha (Brazil) María Pupo
1978	Mexico City	Mexico	Peru	(Venezuela) Francisco López	(Venezuela) Elizabeth Popper	(Dominican Republic) Erol Resek (Dominican Republic) Juan Vila Reinoso	(Cuba) Marta Báez (Cuba) Raquel Ortíz	(Venezuela) Francisco López (Venezuela) Elizabeth Popper

== See also ==
- Pan American Table Tennis Championships
- Table tennis
- Latin American Table Tennis Union
- Table tennis at the Pan American Games
- World Table Tennis Championships
- List of table tennis players
