= Table tennis at the 1987 Pan American Games =

Table tennis was one of the sports contested at the 1987 Pan American Games in Indianapolis in Indiana, United States. There were both individual and team events or both men and women.

== Events ==
Event	Gold	Silver	Bronze
Men's singles	Gideon Joe Ng; Canada	Sean O'Neill; United States	Cláudio Kano; Brazil
Men's singles	Gideon Joe Ng; Canada	Sean O'Neill; United States	Carlos Issamu Kawai; Brazil
Women's singles	Insook Bhushan; United States	Mariann Domonkos; Canada	Mónica Liyau; Peru
Women's singles	Insook Bhushan; United States	Mariann Domonkos; Canada	Carmen Miranda Yera; Cuba
Men's doubles	Canada; Gideon Joe Ng; Horatio Pintea	Brazil; Hugo Hoyama; Cláudio Kano	Chile; Marcos Núñez; Jorge Gambra
Men's doubles	Canada; Gideon Joe Ng; Horatio Pintea	Brazil; Hugo Hoyama; Cláudio Kano	Dominican Republic; Mario Álvarez; Juan Vila
Women's doubles	Cuba; Carmen Miranda Yera; Marisel Ramirez	Canada; Mariann Domonkos; Thanh Mach	Cuba; Madeleine Armas; Marta Báez
Women's doubles	Cuba; Carmen Miranda Yera; Marisel Ramirez	Canada; Mariann Domonkos; Thanh Mach	Ecuador; María Cabrera; Betty Guamancera
Mixed doubles	United States; Khoa Nguyen; Insook Bhushan	United States; Sean O'Neill; Diana Gee	Canada; Joe Ng; Mariann Domonkos
Mixed doubles	United States; Khoa Nguyen; Insook Bhushan	United States; Sean O'Neill; Diana Gee	Venezuela; Francisco Lopez; Elizabeth Popper
Men's team	Brazil; Cláudio Kano; Hugo Hoyama; Carlos Kawai	United States; James Butler; Khoa Nguyen; Sean O'Neill; Quang Bui	Canada; Joe Ng; Horatio Pintea; Cristopher Chu
Women's team	United States; Insook Bhushan; Diana Gee; Lisa Gee; Takako Tren Holme	Cuba; Madeleine Armas; Marta Báez; Carmem Miranda Yera; Maricel Ramirez	Canada; Mariann Domonkos; Thanh Mach; Helene Bedard

== Medal table ==
Place	Nation	Gold medal	Silver medal	Bronze medal	Total
1	United States	3	3	0	6
2	Canada	2	2	3	7
3	Cuba	1	1	2	4
3	Brazil	1	1	2	4
5	Chile	0	0	1	1
5	Dominican Republic	0	0	1	1
5	Ecuador	0	0	1	1
5	Peru	0	0	1	1
5	Venezuela	0	0	1	1
Total		7	7	12	26

== See also ==
- List of Pan American Games medalists in table tennis
