= Table tennis at the 1983 Pan American Games =

== Events ==
Event	Gold	Silver	Bronze
Men's singles	Brian Masters; United States	Ricardo Inokuchi; Brazil	Mario Álvarez; Dominican Republic
Men's singles	Brian Masters; United States	Ricardo Inokuchi; Brazil	Walter Nathan; Peru
Women's singles	Insook Bhushan; United States	Madeleine Armas; Cuba	Elizabeth Popper; Venezuela
Women's singles	Insook Bhushan; United States	Madeleine Armas; Cuba	Marta Báez; Cuba
Men's doubles	Brazil; Ricardo Inokuchi; Cláudio Kano	Dominican Republic; Raymundo Fermin; Juan Vila	United States; Brian Masters; Sean O'Neill
Men's doubles	Brazil; Ricardo Inokuchi; Cláudio Kano	Dominican Republic; Raymundo Fermin; Juan Vila	Chile; Marcos Núñez; Jorge Gambra
Women's doubles	United States; Insook Bhushan; Diana Gee	Cuba; Madeleine Armas; Marta Báez	Venezuela; Elizabeth Popper; Nieves Arevalo
Women's doubles	United States; Insook Bhushan; Diana Gee	Cuba; Madeleine Armas; Marta Báez	Canada; Mariann Domonkos; Thanh Mach
Mixed doubles	United States; Sean O'Neill; Insook Bhushan	Canada; Horatio Pintea; Mariann Domonkos	Brazil; Cláudio Kano; Sandra Noda
Mixed doubles	United States; Sean O'Neill; Insook Bhushan	Canada; Horatio Pintea; Mariann Domonkos	Venezuela; Francisco Lopez; Elizabeth Popper
Men's team	Brazil; Ricardo Inokuchi; Cláudio Kano; Acassio da Cunha; Aristides Nascimento; Maurício Kobayashi	Canada; Joe Ng; Horatio Pintea; Bao Nguyen; Alain Bourbonnais	Dominican Republic; Mario Álvarez; Raymundo Fermin; Juan Vila; Gonzalo Ortiz
Women's team	United States; Insook Bhushan; Diana Gee	Cuba; Madeleine Armas; Marta Báez; Carmem Miranda Yera	Canada; Mariann Domonkos; Thanh Mach; Gloria Hsu

== Medal table ==
Place	Nation	Gold medal	Silver medal	Bronze medal	Total
1	United States	5	0	1	6
2	Brazil	2	1	1	4
3	Cuba	0	3	1	4
4	Canada	0	2	2	4
5	Dominican Republic	0	1	2	3
6	Venezuela	0	0	3	3
7	Chile	0	0	1	1
7	Peru	0	0	1	1
Total		7	7	12	26

== See also ==
- List of Pan American Games medalists in table tennis
