= Table tennis at the 1995 Pan American Games =

Table tennis was one of the sports contested at the 1995 Pan American Games in Mar del Plata, Argentina. There were both individual and team events or both men and women.

== Events ==
Event	Gold	Silver	Bronze
Men's singles	Hugo Hoyama; Brazil	Cláudio Kano; Brazil	James Butler; United States
Men's singles	Hugo Hoyama; Brazil	Cláudio Kano; Brazil	Horatio Pintea; Canada
Women's singles	Lijuan Geng; Canada	Lily Yip; United States	Barbara Chiu; Canada
Women's singles	Lijuan Geng; Canada	Lily Yip; United States	Diana Gee; United States
Men's doubles	Brazil; Hugo Hoyama; Cláudio Kano	Argentina; Pablo Tabachnik; Martin Paradela	Canada; Joe Ng; Horatio Pintea
Men's doubles	Brazil; Hugo Hoyama; Cláudio Kano	Argentina; Pablo Tabachnik; Martin Paradela	Chile; Juan Papic; Juan Salamanca
Women's doubles	Canada; Geng Lijuan; Barbara Chiu	Chile; Sofija Tepes; Jackelin Díaz	United States; Tawny Banh; Wei Wang
Women's doubles	Canada; Geng Lijuan; Barbara Chiu	Chile; Sofija Tepes; Jackelin Díaz	Chile; Berta Rodríguez; Ursula Macaya
Mixed doubles	Canada; Horatio Pintea; Geng Lijuan	Cuba; Francisco Arado; Madeleine Armas	Brazil; Hugo Hoyama; Lívia Kosaka
Mixed doubles	Canada; Horatio Pintea; Geng Lijuan	Cuba; Francisco Arado; Madeleine Armas	Canada; Joe Ng; Barbara Chiu
Men's team	Brazil; Cláudio Kano; Hugo Hoyama; Carlos Kawai; Silnei Yuta	United States; James Butler; Sean O'Neill; Chi-Sun Chui; Derek May	Canada; Joe Ng; Horatio Pintea; Francis Trudel; D. Su
Women's team	Canada; Geng Lijuan; Barbara Chiu; Chris Xu; Petra Cada	United States; Diana Gee; Lily Yip; Tawny Banh; Wei Wang	Cuba; Madeleine Armas; Yolaisdis García; Marisel Ramírez; Yolanda Rodriguez

== Medal table ==
Place	Nation	Gold medal	Silver medal	Bronze medal	Total
1	Canada	4	0	5	9
2	Brazil	3	1	1	5
3	United States	0	3	3	6
4	Chile	0	1	2	3
5	Cuba	0	1	1	2
6	Argentina	0	1	0	1
Total		7	7	12	26

== See also ==
- List of Pan American Games medalists in table tennis
