= Table tennis at the 2006 South American Games =

- Dates: March 21-26

Table tennis at the 2006 South American Games was held from March 21 to March 26. All games were played at River Plate Club in Buenos Aires, Argentina.

== Medalists ==
Event	Gold	Silver	Bronze
Singles Men	Liu Song (ARG)	Gustavo Tsuboi (BRA)	Pablo Tabachnik (ARG); Hugo Hoyama (BRA)
Singles Women	Fabiola Ramos (VEN)	Ligia Silva (BRA)	Paula Medina (COL); Mariany Nonaka (BRA)
Doubles Men	Brazil (Thiago Monteiro / Hugo Hoyama)	Brazil (Cazuo Matsumoto / Gustavo Tsuboi)	Argentina (Pablo Tabachnik / Liu Song); Argentina (Oscar Gonzalez / Gaston Alto)
Doubles Women	Venezuela (Fabiola Ramos / Ruaida Ezzedine)	Venezuela (Mariana Guánchez / María Mata)	Brazil (Mariany Nonaka / Ligia Silva); Colombia (Paula Medina / Johana Araque)
Doubles Mixed	Chile (Juan Papic / Bertha Rodríguez)	Brazil (Thiago Monteiro / Ligia Silva)	Chile (Augusto Morales / Melita Yañez); Brazil (Hugo Hoyama / Mariany Nonaka)
Team Men	Brazil (Hugo Hoyama, Thiago Monteiro, Cazuo Matsumoto)	Argentina (Pablo Tabachnik, Liu Song, Gastón Alto)	Chile (Juan Papic, Augusto Morales, Andrés Cortés, Pablo Gaete); Venezuela (Henry Mujica, Jonathan Pino, Luis Díaz, Marcos Navas)
Team Women	Brazil (Ligia Silva, Karin Sako, Mariany Nonaka)	Chile (Berta Rodríguez, Paulina Vega, Melita Yáñez, Natalia Castellano)	Colombia (Paula Medina, Johanna Araque, Briana Díaz); Venezuela (Fabiola Ramos, Ruaida Ezzedine, Mariana Guánchez, María Mata)
