= Table tennis at the 1991 Pan American Games =

Table tennis was one of the sports contested at the 1991 Pan American Games in Havana, Cuba. There were both individual and team events or both men and women.

== Events ==
Event	Gold	Silver	Bronze
Men's singles	Hugo Hoyama; Brazil	Cláudio Kano; Brazil	James Butler; United States
Men's singles	Hugo Hoyama; Brazil	Cláudio Kano; Brazil	Horatio Pintea; Canada
Women's singles	Insook Bhushan; United States	Lily Yip; United States	Jackeline Díaz; Chile
Women's singles	Insook Bhushan; United States	Lily Yip; United States	Madeleine Armas; Cuba
Men's doubles	Brazil; Hugo Hoyama; Cláudio Kano	Canada; Joe Ng; Horatio Pintea	Brazil; Carlos Kawai; Silney Yuta
Men's doubles	Brazil; Hugo Hoyama; Cláudio Kano	Canada; Joe Ng; Horatio Pintea	Cuba; Ruben Arado; Ernesto Gonzalez
Women's doubles	United States; Li Ai; Lily Yip	United States; Insook Bhushan; Diana Gee	Cuba; Madeleine Armas; Yolanda Rodrigues
Women's doubles	United States; Li Ai; Lily Yip	United States; Insook Bhushan; Diana Gee	Canada; Julie Barton; Caroline Sylvestre
Mixed doubles	United States; Sean O'Neill; Diana Gee	Cuba; Rubén Arado; Yolanda Rodriguez	Cuba; Madeleine Armas; Ernesto Gonzalez
Mixed doubles	United States; Sean O'Neill; Diana Gee	Cuba; Rubén Arado; Yolanda Rodriguez	Canada; Joe Ng; Julie Barton
Men's team	Brazil; Cláudio Kano; Hugo Hoyama; Carlos Kawai; Silnei Yuta	United States; James Butler; Sean O'Neill; Dhirem Narotam; Chi-Sun Chui	Canada; Joe Ng; Horatio Pintea; Francis Trudel; Come-Vincent Bernier
Women's team	United States; Insook Bhushan; Diana Gee; Lily Yip; Li Ai	Cuba; Madeleine Armas; Yolanda Rodriguez; Leticia Suarez; Maricel Ramirez	Brazil; Carla Tibério; Lyanne Kosaka; Marta Massuda; Mônica Dotti

== Medal table ==
Place	Nation	Gold medal	Silver medal	Bronze medal	Total
1	United States	4	3	1	8
2	Brazil	3	1	2	6
3	Cuba	0	2	4	6
4	Canada	0	1	4	5
5	Chile	0	0	1	1
Total		7	7	12	26

== See also ==
- List of Pan American Games medalists in table tennis
