= Table tennis at the 1999 Pan American Games =

- Table tennis pictogram for the games
- Venue: Red River College Gym

Table tennis competitions at the 2015 Pan American Games in Winnipeg were held at the Red River College Gym. A total of four events were held.

== Events ==
Event	Gold	Silver	Bronze
Men's singles	David Zhuang; United States	Liu Song; Argentina	Francisco Arado; Cuba
Men's singles	David Zhuang; United States	Liu Song; Argentina	Jorge Gambra Said; Chile
Women's singles	Gao Jun Chang; United States	Lijuan Geng; Canada	Petra Cada; Canada
Women's singles	Gao Jun Chang; United States	Lijuan Geng; Canada	Amy Feng; United States
Men's team	United States; David Zhuang; Eric Owens; Todd Sweeris	Argentina; Liu Song; Pablo Tabachnik; Juan Frery	Brazil; Hugo Hoyama; Thiago Monteiro; Carlos Kawai
Men's team	United States; David Zhuang; Eric Owens; Todd Sweeris	Argentina; Liu Song; Pablo Tabachnik; Juan Frery	Canada; Pradeeban Peter-Paul; Xavier Therien; Horatio Pintea
Women's team	United States; Gao Jun; Tawny Banh; Amy Feng	Canada; Geng Lijuan; Chris Xu; Petra Cada	Brazil; Eugênia Ferreira; Lígia Silva; Lyanne Kosaka
Women's team	United States; Gao Jun; Tawny Banh; Amy Feng	Canada; Geng Lijuan; Chris Xu; Petra Cada	Chile; Berta Rodríguez; Sofija Tepes; Silvia Morel

== Medal table ==
Rank	Nation	Gold	Silver	Bronze	Total
1	United States	4	0	1	5
2	Canada	0	2	2	4
3	Argentina	0	2	0	2
4	Brazil	0	0	2	2
4	Chile	0	0	2	2
6	Cuba	0	0	1	1
Totals (6 entries)		4	4	8	16

== See also ==
- List of Pan American Games medalists in table tennis
