= Table tennis at the 2011 Pan American Games – Men's team =

Table tennis – Men's team at the 2011 Pan American Games
- Venue: CODE Dome
- Dates: 15–17 October 2011
- Competitors: 36 from 12 nations

Medalists
Gold medal	Hugo Hoyama; Gustavo Tsuboi; Thiago Monteiro	Brazil
Silver medal	Pablo Tabachnik; Liu Song; Gaston Alto	Argentina
Bronze medal	Andy Pereira; Jorge Campos; Pavel Oxamendi	Cuba
Bronze medal	Marcos Madrid; Guillermo Muñoz; Jude Okoh	Mexico

The men's team competition of the table tennis events at the 2011 Pan American Games was held between 15 and 17 October 2011 at the CODE Dome in Guadalajara, Mexico. The defending Pan American Games champion was Brazil (Hugo Hoyama, Thiago Monteiro and Gustavo Tsuboi).

== Round robin ==
The round robin will be used as a qualification round. The twelve teams will be split into groups of four. The top two teams from each group will advance to the first round of playoffs.

=== Group A ===
Nation	Pld	W	L	GF	GA
Brazil	2	2	0	6	0
Dominican Republic	2	1	1	3	5
Ecuador	2	0	2	2	6

15 October; 12:00	Report	Brazil	3–0	Ecuador	CODE Dome
Score by game:
Hugo Hoyama	3–0	Geovanny Coello
Gustavo Tsuboi	3–1	Alberto Mino
Thiago Monteiro/Hugo Hoyama	3–0	Dino Suarez/Geovanny Coello

15 October; 16:00	Report	Brazil	3–0	Dominican Republic	CODE Dome
Score by game:
Gustavo Tsuboi	3–2	Ju Lin
Thiago Monteiro	3–0	Juan Vila
Thiago Monteiro/Hugo Hoyama	3–2	Juan Vila/Emil Santos

16 October; 10:00	Report	Dominican Republic	3–2	Ecuador	CODE Dome
16 October; 10:00	Report	Score by game:			CODE Dome
16 October; 10:00	Report	Ju Lin	3–0	Alberto Mino	CODE Dome
Juan Villa			0–3	Geovanny Coello
Juan Villa/Emil Santos			3–0	Dino Suarez/Geovanny Coello
Emil Santos			2–3	Alberto Mino
Ju Lin			3–0	Dino Suarez
			–

=== Group B ===
Nation	Pld	W	L	GF	GA
Argentina	2	2	0	6	2
United States	2	1	1	5	3
Chile	2	0	2	0	6

15 October; 12:00	Report	Argentina	3–0	Chile	CODE Dome
Score by game:
Pablo Tabachnik	3–0	Felipe Olivares
Liu Song	3–0	Alejandro Rodriguez
Pablo Tabachnik/Gaston Alto	3–2	Alejandro Rodriguez/Andres Carlier

15 October; 16:00	Report	Argentina	3–2	United States	CODE Dome
15 October; 16:00	Report	Score by game:			CODE Dome
15 October; 16:00	Report	Liu Song	3–0	Yiyong Fan	CODE Dome
Pablo Tabachnik			1–3	Timothy Wang
Pablo Tabachnik/Gaston Alto			2–3	Timothy Wang/Mark Hazinski
Liu Song			3–0	Mark Hazinski
Gaston Alto			3–2	Yiyong Fan
			–

16 October; 10:00	Report	United States	3–0	Chile	CODE Dome
Score by game:
Timothy Wang	3–1	Felipe Olivares
Yiyong Fan	3–1	Alejandro Rodriguez
Timothy Wang/Mark Hazinski	3–2	Alejandro Rodriguez/Andres Carlier

=== Group C ===
Nation	Pld	W	L	GF	GA
Mexico	2	2	0	6	2
Canada	2	1	1	4	3
Guatemala	2	0	2	1	6

15 October; 12:00	Report	Canada	3–0	Guatemala	CODE Dome
Score by game:
Pradeeban Peter-Paul	3–1	Jose Miguel Ramirez
Pierre-Luc Hinse	3–1	Hector Gatica
Pierre-Luc Hinse/Pierre-Luc Theiault	3–1	Hector Gatica/Heber Moscoso

15 October; 16:00	Report	Canada	1–3	Mexico	CODE Dome
Score by game:
Pradeeban Peter-Paul	0–3	Marcos Madrid
Pierre-Luc Hinse	3–1	Guillermo Muñoz
Pierre-Luc Hinse/Pierre-Luc Theiault	0–3	Guillermo Munoz/Jude Okoh
Marcos Madrid	0–3	Pierre-Luc Hinse

16 October; 10:00	Report	Mexico	3–1	Guatemala	CODE Dome
Score by game:
Marcos Madrid	3–2	Jose Miguel Ramirez
Guillermo Muñoz	3–1	Hector Gatica
Guillermo Muñoz/Jude Okoh	2–3	Hector Gatica/Heber Moscoso
Marcos Madrid	3–1	Heber Moscoso

=== Group D ===
Nation	Pld	W	L	GF	GA
Cuba	2	2	0	6	0
Venezuela	2	1	1	3	3
El Salvador	2	0	2	0	6

15 October; 12:00	Report	Venezuela	3–0	El Salvador	CODE Dome
Score by game:
Henry Mujica	3–2	Josie Donado
Jonathan Pino	3–1	Henry Mejia
Jonathan Pino/Marco Navas	3–0	Luis Mejia/Saul Bonilla

15 October; 16:00	Report	Venezuela	0–3	Cuba	CODE Dome
Score by game:
Jonathan Pino	1–3	Andy Pereira
Luis Mejia	2–3	Pavel Oxamendi
Jonathan Pino/Marco Navas	0–3	Pavel Oxamendi/Jorge Campos

16 October; 10:00	Report	Cuba	3–0	El Salvador	CODE Dome
Score by game:
Jorge Campos	3–0	Josue Donado
Andy Pereira	3–0	Luis Mejia
Pavel Oxamendi/Jorge Campos	3–0	Luis Mejia/Saul Bonilla

== Playoffs ==
Quarterfinals
Brazil	3	3	3
United States	0	0	1
Canada	2	0	3	2
Cuba	3	3	2	3
Mexico	3	3	2	3
Dominican Republic	1	1	3	0
Venezuela	1	2	0
Argentina	3	3	3

Semifinals
Brazil	1	3	2	3	3
Cuba	3	0	3	2	1
Mexico	3	1	1	3	2
Argentina	2	3	3	0	3

Final
Brazil	3	3	1	3
Argentina	0	1	3	1

=== Quarterfinals ===
16 October; 10:00
Hugo Hoyama
Thiago Monteiro/Hugo Hoyama

Brazil	3–0	United States	CODE Dome
Score by game:
Gustavo Tsuboi	3–0	Timothy Wang
3–0	Yiyong Fan
3–1	Mark Hazinski/Timothy Wang

16 October; 10:00
Pierre-Luc Hinse
Pierre-Luc Thierault/Pierre-Luc Hinse
Pradeeban Peter

Canada	1–3	Cuba	CODE Dome
Score by game:
Pradeeban Peter	2–3	Pavel Oxamendi
0–3	Andy Pereira
3–2	Jorge Campos/Pavel Oxamendi
2–3	Jorge Campos

16 October; 10:00
Jude Okoh
Guillermo Munoz/Jude Okoh
Marcos Madrid

Mexico	3–1	Dominican Republic	CODE Dome
Score by game:
Marcos Madrid	3–1	Lin Ju
3–1	Emil Santos
2–3	Juan Vila/Emil Santos
3–0	Juan Vila

16 October; 10:00
Henry Mujica
Pablo Tabachnik/Gaston Alto

Venezuela	0–3	Argentina	CODE Dome
Score by game:
Jonathan Pino	1–3	Liu Song
2–3	Gaston Alto
0–3	Marco Navas/Jonathan Pino

=== Semifinals ===
16 October; 18:00
Gustavo Tsuboi
Thiago Monteiro/Hugo Hoyama
Thiago Monteiro
Gustavo Tsuboi

Brazil	3–2	Cuba (bronze)	CODE Dome
Score by game:
Hugo Hoyama	1–3	Andy Pereira
3–0	Jorge Campos
2–3	Pavel Oxamendi/Jorge Campos
3–2	Andy Pereira
3–1	Pavel Oxamendi
–

16 October; 18:00
Guillermo Munoz
Jude Okoh/Guillermo Munoz
Marcos Madrid
Jude Okoh

(bronze) Mexico	2–3	Argentina	CODE Dome
Score by game:
Marcos Madrid	3–2	Liu Song
1–3	Pablo Tabachnik
1–3	Gaston Alto/Liu Song
3–0	Gaston Alto
2–3	Pablo Tabachnik
–

=== Final ===
17 October; 12:00	Report	(gold) Brazil	3–1	Argentina (silver)	CODE Dome
Score by game:
Gustavo Tsuboi	3–0	Liu Song
Thiago Monteiro	3–1	Pablo Tabachnik
Thiago Monteiro/Hugo Hoyama	1–3	Liu Song/Gaston Alto
Hugo Hoyama	3–1	Pablo Tabachnik
