= Table tennis at the 2008 Summer Olympics – Women's singles =

Table tennis – Women's singles at the Games of the XXIX Olympiad
- Venue: Peking University Gymnasium
- Date: August 18 to August 22, 2008
- Competitors: 78 from 42 nations

Medalists
1st place, gold medalist(s)		Zhang Yining	China
2nd place, silver medalist(s)		Wang Nan	China
3rd place, bronze medalist(s)		Guo Yue	China

The women's singles table tennis event was a part of the table tennis program at the 2008 Summer Olympics and took place at the Peking University Gymnasium. The tournament started on August 18 with the final on August 22.

78 athletes from 42 countries took part in the women's single event. The tournament was a single elimination tournament with a third place playoff played between the two losing semi-finalists. The top 16 seeds in the tournament received a bye to the third round. Seeds 17 through 32 received a bye to the second round, seeds 33 to 50 received a bye to the first round while seeds 51 to 78 contested in the preliminary round.

== Schedule ==
All times are China Standard Time (UTC+8).

Dates	Start time	Round
August 18	10:00	Preliminary round
August 19	12:15	First round
August 19	13:45	First round
August 19	18:00	First round
August 19	19:30	First round
August 19	21:00	Second round
August 20	10:00	Second round
August 20	12:00	Second round
August 20	15:00	Third round
August 20	18:00	Third round
August 20	20:00	Third round
August 21	10:00	Fourth round
August 21	18:00	Quarterfinals
August 22	10:00	Semifinals
August 22	19:30	Bronze medal match
August 22	20:30	Gold medal match

== Seeds ==
Seeds for the draw of the Olympics were based on the ITTF world ranking list published on July 1, 2008. The top 16 seeded players qualified directly to the third round.

1. Zhang Yining (CHN) (champion, gold medallist)
2. Guo Yue (CHN) (semifinals, bronze medallist)
3. Wang Nan (CHN) (final, silver medallist)
4. Li Jiawei (SIN) (semifinals, fourth place)
5. Wang Yuegu (SIN) (third round)
6. Feng Tianwei (SIN) (quarterfinals)
7. Tie Ya Na (HKG) (quarterfinals)
8. Kim Kyung-ah (KOR) (fourth round)
9. Ai Fukuhara (JPN) (fourth round)
10. Lin Ling (HKG) (fourth round)
11. Li Jiao (NED) (fourth round)
12. Liu Jia (AUT) (third round)
13. Hirano Sayaka (JPN) (third round)
14. Wang Chen (USA) (quarterfinals)
15. Park Mi-young (KOR) (fourth round)
16. Wu Jiaduo (GER) (third round)

The players ranked from 17 to 32 qualified directly to the second round.

17. Gao Jun (USA) (fourth round)
18. Dang Ye-seo (KOR) (third round)
19. Haruna Fukuoka (JPN) (third round)
20. Tamara Boroš (CRO) (third round)
21. Li Qian (POL) (second round)
22. Shen Yanfei (ESP) (third round)
23. Viktoria Pavlovich (BLR) (third round)
24. Lau Sui Fei (HKG) (third round)
25. Krisztina Tóth (HUN) (third round)
26. Ni Xialian (LUX) (third round)
27. Elke Schall (GER) (second round)
28. Georgina Póta (HUN) (third round)
29. Li Jie (NED) (fourth round)
30. Daniela Dodean (ROU) (second round)
31. Wu Xue (DOM) (quarterfinals)
32. Li Qiangbing (AUT) (fourth round)

== Draw ==
=== Finals ===
Semifinals
1	Zhang Yining (CHN)	9	11	12	11	11
4	Li Jiawei (SIN)	11	8	10	8	5
3	Wang Nan (CHN)	3	11	4	11	11	11
2	Guo Yue (CHN)	11	8	11	7	3	6

Gold medal match
1	Zhang Yining (CHN) (gold)	8	13	11	11	11
3	Wang Nan (CHN) (silver)	11	11	8	8	3
Bronze medal match
4	Li Jiawei (SIN)	6	12	11	11	3	4
2	Guo Yue (CHN) (bronze)	11	14	9	7	11	11

=== Top half ===
==== Section 1 ====
Second round
23	Vi Pavlovich (BLR)	3	11	11	11	12
34	E Samara (ROU)	11	8	8	7	10
27	E Schall (GER)	6	11	10	6	11	7
42	M Hu (TUR)	11	6	12	11	6	11
29	Li Jie (NED)	8	11	11	14	11
42	Zhu F (ESP)	11	4	7	12	5
18	Dang Y-s (KOR)	11	7	11	11	11
58	M Miao (AUS)	3	11	3	6	6

Third round
1	Zhang Y (CHN)	11	11	11	11
23	Vi Pavlovich (BLR)	7	2	7	5
9	A Fukuhara (JPN)	11	11	11	9	11
42	M Hu (TUR)	6	8	7	11	5
12	Liu J (AUT)	5	8	11	10	3
29	Li Jie (NED)	11	11	9	12	11
6	Feng T (SIN)	11	11	11	11
18	Dang Y-s (KOR)	4	5	3	5

Fourth round
1	Zhang Y (CHN)	11	11	11	9	11
9	A Fukuhara (JPN)	5	2	5	11	8
29	Li Jie (NED)	11	11	7	5	4
6	Feng T (SIN)	7	13	11	11	11

Quarterfinals
1	Zhang Y (CHN)	13	12	14	12	13
6	Feng T (SIN)	11	14	12	10	11

==== Section 2 ====
Second round
19	H Fukuoka (JPN)	11	11	11	11
39	N Komwong (THA)	9	7	9	5
25	K Tóth (HUN)	8	11	11	11	4	6	11
51	R Paškauskienė (LTU)	11	5	8	6	11	11	3
21	Li Q (POL)	7	9	6	11	11	10
47	T Kostromina (BLR)	11	11	11	5	9	12
20	T Boroš (CRO)	11	11	11	8	11
41	N Stefanova (ITA)	4	6	6	11	8

Third round
8	Kim K-a (KOR)	11	14	12	12	11	11
19	H Fukuoka (JPN)	9	16	10	14	9	7
14	Wang C (USA)	11	11	11	11	11
25	K Tóth (HUN)	7	7	6	13	2
10	Lin L (HKG)	11	11	11	11
47	T Kostromina (BLR)	6	3	6	8
4	Li J (SIN)	11	11	7	11	11
20	T Boroš (CRO)	8	7	11	6	5

Fourth round
8	Kim K-a (KOR)	9	11	8	12	11	9	5
14	Wang C (USA)	11	9	11	10	6	11	11
10	Lin L (HKG)	11	12	12	8	11	9	11
4	Li J (SIN)	4	14	10	11	5	11	13

Quarterfinals
14	Wang C (USA)	13	6	10	15	4
4	Li J (SIN)	15	11	12	13	11

=== Bottom half ===
==== Section 3 ====
Second round
28	G Póta (HUN)	11	8	11	12	4	12	12
62	D Hadacova (CZE)	3	11	6	14	11	10	10
30	D Dodean (ROU)	5	7	5	11	8
40	Kim J (PRK)	11	11	11	5	11
32	Li Q (AUT)	8	11	11	8	11	11
37	W Tan Monfardini (ITA)	11	7	8	11	5	4
22	Shen Y (ESP)	11	7	11	6	13	11
35	S Paović (CRO)	8	11	9	11	11	9

Third round
3	Wang N (CHN)	11	11	11	11
28	G Póta (HUN)	6	7	6	2
15	Park M-y (KOR)	11	11	11	11
40	Kim J (PRK)	7	4	8	6
16	Wu J (GER)	9	12	11	8	11	9	9
32	Li Q (AUT)	11	10	6	11	3	11	11
7	Tie YN (HKG)	6	11	12	11	11
22	Shen Y (ESP)	11	7	10	4	5

Fourth round
3	Wang N (CHN)	11	11	9	11	11	11
15	Park M-y (KOR)	7	7	11	6	13	5
32	Li Q (AUT)	9	11	11	2	9	11	3
7	Tie YN (HKG)	11	9	2	11	11	8	11

Quarterfinals
3	Wang N (CHN)	11	11	11	11	11
7	Tie YN (HKG)	5	4	13	2	4

==== Section 4 ====
Second round
31	Wu X (DOM)	11	13	11	11
61	S Sang (AUS)	5	11	9	6
17	Gao J (USA)	10	11	11	9	11	11
52	E Odorova (SVK)	12	2	9	11	9	4
26	Ni X (LUX)	11	5	11	13	11
33	Huang I-h (TPE)	6	11	4	11	7
24	Lau SF (HKG)	11	9	11	11	11
36	Xian YF (FRA)	3	11	3	8	4

Third round
5	Wang Y (SIN)	9	11	2	8	10
31	Wu X (DOM)	11	9	11	11	12
13	H Sayaka (JPN)	12	1	12	7	12
17	Gao J (USA)	14	11	10	11	14
11	Li Jiao (NED)	6	11	11	11	11
26	Ni X (LUX)	11	8	9	8	8
2	Guo Y (CHN)	11	11	11	11
24	Lau SF (HKG)	2	8	6	6

Fourth round
31	Wu X (DOM)	12	11	6	11	8	12	11
17	Gao J (USA)	10	8	11	3	11	14	9
11	Li Jiao (NED)	2	6	3	11
2	Guo Y (CHN)	11	11	11	13

Quarterfinals
31	Wu X (DOM)	5	14	11	5
2	Guo Y (CHN)	11	16	13	11

== Preliminary rounds ==
=== Top half ===
==== Section 1 ====
Preliminary round
63	Yang F (CGO)	4	11	9	11	13	11
65	C Huang (USA)	11	8	11	5	11	9
53	Pan L-c (TPE)	11	11	11	11
75	S Abdul-Aziz (EGY)	4	4	2	1
54	M Pesotska (UKR)	11	11	11	11
74	M Shumakova (KAZ)	8	6	6	6
58	M Miao (AUS)	11	11	11	14
73	C Offiong (NGR)	7	5	5	12

First round
34	E Samara (ROU)	11	11	6	11	11
63	Yang F (CGO)	4	2	11	4	6
42	M Hu (TUR)	9	11	11	11	11
53	Pan L-c (TPE)	11	9	4	8	6
42	Zhu F (ESP)	9	11	11	11	11
54	M Pesotska (UKR)	11	8	4	7	9
48	I Kotikhina (RUS)	9	13	11	12	8	11	9
58	M Miao (AUS)	11	15	5	10	11	4	11

==== Section 2 ====
Preliminary round
60	Lian Q (DOM)	11	11	11	11
77	VA Fomum (CMR)	3	1	6	5
51	R Paškauskienė (LTU)	11	11	15	11
69	M Nonaka (BRA)	3	6	13	3
59	Zhang M (CAN)	11	11	12	11
68	P Medina (COL)	5	5	10	8

First round
39	N Komwong (THA)	7	11	11	11	12
60	Lian Q (DOM)	11	5	6	6	10
45	Kim M-y (PRK)	5	11	11	5	5	11	5
51	R Paškauskienė (LTU)	11	9	3	11	11	6	11
47	T Kostromina (BLR)	11	11	12	11
59	Zhang M (CAN)	2	7	10	1
41	N Stefanova (ITA)	11	11	11	11
50	O Fadeyeva (RUS)	5	5	7	6

=== Bottom half ===
==== Section 3 ====
Preliminary round
62	D Hadacova (CZE)	11	11	11	11
70	Z Shaban (JOR)	3	6	8	5
64	J Long (CAN)	11	14	8	7	9
66	F Ramos (VEN)	5	16	11	11	11
55	T Sorochinskaya (UKR)	11	11	12	11
76	N Yossry (EGY)	5	4	10	7
57	JF Lay (AUS)	10	11	13	11	11
67	N Aggarwal (IND)	12	8	11	8	4

First round
44	Ve Pavlovich (BLR)	11	7	9	11	9	6
62	D Hadacova (CZE)	7	11	11	5	11	11
40	Kim J (PRK)	11	11	11	11
66	F Ramos (VEN)	7	7	7	7
37	W Tan Monfardini (ITA)	11	11	9	11	7	11
55	T Sorochinskaya (UKR)	7	6	11	4	11	4
35	S Paović (CRO)	5	11	12	10	12	11	11
57	JF Lay (AUS)	11	9	10	12	14	4	9

==== Section 4 ====
Preliminary round
61	S Sang (AUS)	11	10	11	11	11
71	B Kaffo (NGR)	8	12	9	2	7
52	E Odorova (SVK)	11	11	11	11
78	P Tommy (VAN)	5	7	2	3
56	A Bakula (CRO)	12	11	11	11
72	Y Silva (MEX)	10	8	2	8

First round
38	S Ganina (RUS)
61	S Sang (AUS)	w/o
46	P Lovas (HUN)	9	6	4	11	11	10
52	E Odorova (SVK)	11	11	11	8	9	12
33	Huang I-h (TPE)	11	11	11	9	11
56	A Bakula (CRO)	9	6	7	11	9
36	Xian YF (FRA)	11	11	6	11	8	8	11
49	Xu J (POL)	6	4	11	9	11	11	7
