= Table tennis at the 2010 South American Games =

- Dates: March 21-26

Table tennis at the 2010 South American Games in Medellín was held from March 21 to March 26. All games were played at Coliseo Menor Rodrigo Pérez Castro.

== Medal summary ==
=== Medal table ===
Rank	Nation	Gold	Silver	Bronze	Total
1	Brazil (BRA)	4	3	2	9
2	Argentina (ARG)	1	2	1	4
3	Colombia (COL)	1	1	3	5
3	Venezuela (VEN)	1	1	3	5
5	Chile (CHI)	0	0	3	3
6	Ecuador (ECU)	0	0	2	2
Totals (6 entries)		7	7	14	28

== Medalists ==
Event	Gold	Silver	Bronze
Singles Men	Gustavo Tsuboi; Brazil	Gaston Alto; Argentina	Alberto Mino; Ecuador; Liu Song; Argentina
Singles Women	Paula Medina; Colombia	Fabiola Ramos; Venezuela	Ligia Silva; Brazil; Berta Rodríguez; Chile
Doubles Men	Argentina	Brazil	Venezuela; Venezuela
Doubles Women	Venezuela	Brazil	Colombia; Brazil
Doubles Mixed	Brazil	Brazil	Colombia; Chile
Team Men	Brazil	Argentina	Colombia; Ecuador
Team Women	Brazil	Colombia	Chile; Venezuela
