= Chile at the 1999 Pan American Games =

- IOC code: CHI
- NOC: Comité Olímpico de Chile

in Winnipeg 23 July – 8 August 1999
- Medals Ranked 12th: Gold 1 Silver 4 Bronze 7 Total 12

Pan American Games appearances (overview)
- 1951; 1955; 1959; 1963; 1967; 1971; 1975; 1979; 1983; 1987; 1991; 1995; 1999; 2003; 2007; 2011; 2015; 2019; 2023

The 13th Pan American Games were held in Winnipeg, Manitoba, Canada from July 23 to August 8, 1999.

== Medalists ==
Medal	Name	Sport	Event
Gold	Erika Olivera	Athletics	Women's Marathon
Silver	Denisse Van Lamoen	Archery	Women's Individual
Silver	Paris Inostroza; Luciano Inostroza; Sergio Penzo; Javier Gutierrez	Fencing	Men's Team Épée
Silver	Bárbara Castro; Paula Cabezas	Tennis	Women's Doubles
Silver	Cristian Escalante	Weightlifting	Men's 105
Bronze	Sebastian Keitel	Athletics	Men's 200 metres
Bronze	Jorge Gambra	Table Tennis	Men's Singles
Bronze	Berta Rodriguez; Sofija Tepes; Silvia Morel	Table Tennis	Women's Team
Bronze	Richard Rodirguez; Luis Spulveda	Cycling	Men's Madison
Bronze	Javier Godoy	Rowing	Men's Singles scull
Bronze	Miguel Cerda; Christián Yantani; Javier Godoy; Félipe Leal	Rowing	Men's Coxless Four
Bronze	Angela Grisar; Loreto Barriga	Racquetball	Women's Doubles

== See also ==
- Chile at the Pan American Games
- Chile at the 2000 Summer Olympics
