= Gustavo Tsuboi =

Brazilian table tennis player (born 1985)

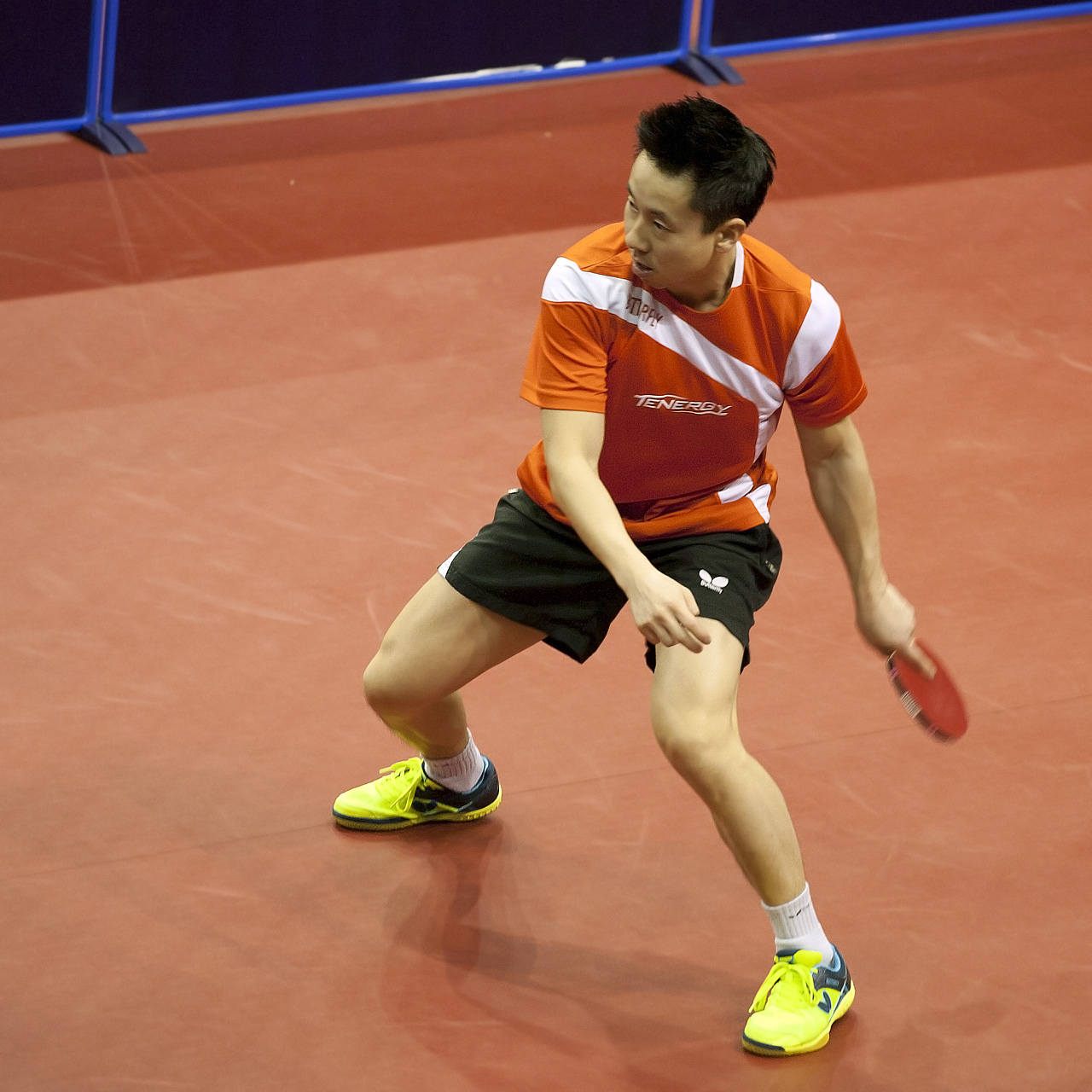
- Tsuboi at the 2017 ITTF World Tour German Open, Magdeburg, Germany.

Personal information
- Nationality: Brazil
- Born: May 31, 1985 (age 41) São Paulo, São Paulo, Brazil

Sport
- Sport: Table tennis
- Highest ranking: 28 (1 September 2019)
Medal record
Men's table tennis
Representing Brazil
Pan-American Games
Gold medal – first place	2007 Rio de Janeiro	Team
Gold medal – first place	2011 Guadalajara	Team
Gold medal – first place	2015 Toronto	Team
Gold medal – first place	2019 Lima	Doubles
Silver medal – second place	2003 Santo Domingo	Doubles
Silver medal – second place	2015 Toronto	Singles
Silver medal – second place	2019 Lima	Mixed doubles
Bronze medal – third place	2019 Lima	Team
Pan American Championships
Gold medal – first place	2019 Asunción	Team
Gold medal – first place	2021 Lima	Team
Silver medal – second place	2019 Asunción	Doubles
Bronze medal – third place	2019 Asunción	Singles
Pan American Cup
Gold medal – first place	2017 San Jose	Singles
Silver medal – second place	2018 Asunción	Singles
Silver medal – second place	2020 Guaynabo	Singles
Bronze medal – third place	2019 Guaynabo	Singles
Latin American Championships
Gold medal – first place	2014 Santo Domingo	Team
Silver medal – second place	2014 Santo Domingo	Singles
Silver medal – second place	2014 Santo Domingo	Mixed Doubles
Latin American Cup
Gold medal – first place	2011 Rio de Janeiro	Singles
Gold medal – first place	2015 Havana	Singles
Bronze medal – third place	2013 Santo Domingo	Singles
Bronze medal – third place	2014 Asuncion	Singles
South American Games
Gold medal – first place	2010 Medellín	Singles
Gold medal – first place	2010 Medellín	Team
Gold medal – first place	2014 Santiago	Singles
Silver medal – second place	2006 B.Aires	Singles
Silver medal – second place	2006 B.Aires	Doubles
Silver medal – second place	2010 Medellín	Doubles
Silver medal – second place	2014 Santiago	Team

Gustavo Tsuboi (born 31 May 1985) is a table tennis player from Brazil, he won three medals in double and team events in the Pan American Games. Along with Hugo Hoyama and Thiago Monteiro, Tsuboi was part of the winning team at the 2007 Pan American Games and 2011 Pan American Games.

Tsuboi won the gold medal at the inaugural 2011 Latin American Cup held in Rio de Janeiro, Brazil after defeating Paraguay's Marcelo Aguirre 4–0. Tsuboi competed in table tennis at the 2008 and 2012 Summer Olympics.

== Career ==
In the World Championships, Tsuboi's best campaigns in singles were the 2nd round in 2011, 2013, 2015 and 2021. His best performance was in 2013, when he managed to make it difficult for the Chinese player Zhang Jike, almost winning the first set and winning the second. In doubles, Tsuboi reached the 3rd round (round of 16) three times, in 2009, 2015 and 2017, each time losing by 4 sets to 2. The best campaign was in 2009, when playing in Japan and making it difficult for the Japanese duo to win, who ended up being bronze medalists in the tournament. In mixed doubles, Tsuboi managed to reach the 3rd round (round of 16) in 2013, being eliminated by the Chinese pair seeded n.2, but managing to win a set of them.

At the Table Tennis World Cup, Tsuboi made history by reaching the quarterfinals of the competition in 2015, equaling Brazil's best result in the tournament's history. Until then, Cláudio Kano, in 1987 and 1989, had also reached the quarterfinals. He also reached the round of 16 in 2017 and 2018.

At the 2018 World Team Table Tennis Championships, Tsuboi reached the quarterfinals playing with Hugo Calderano and Eric Jouti.

=== 2021 ===
At the WTT Star Contender in Doha, held in March 2021, Tsuboi reached the round of 16 after defeating the Japanese Koki Niwa (17th). He was eliminated by South Korean Jeoung Youngsik, 13th in the world rankings.

=== 2020 Olympic Games ===
At the 2020 Olympic Games in Tokyo, Tsuboi, 37th in the world, by defeating Nigerian Quadri Aruna (21st in the world ranking), became the 3rd Brazilian in history to reach the round of 16 in the Olympics. The feat had only been achieved by Hugo Hoyama (Atlanta 1996) and Hugo Calderano (Rio 2016).

== Best results by type of tournament ==
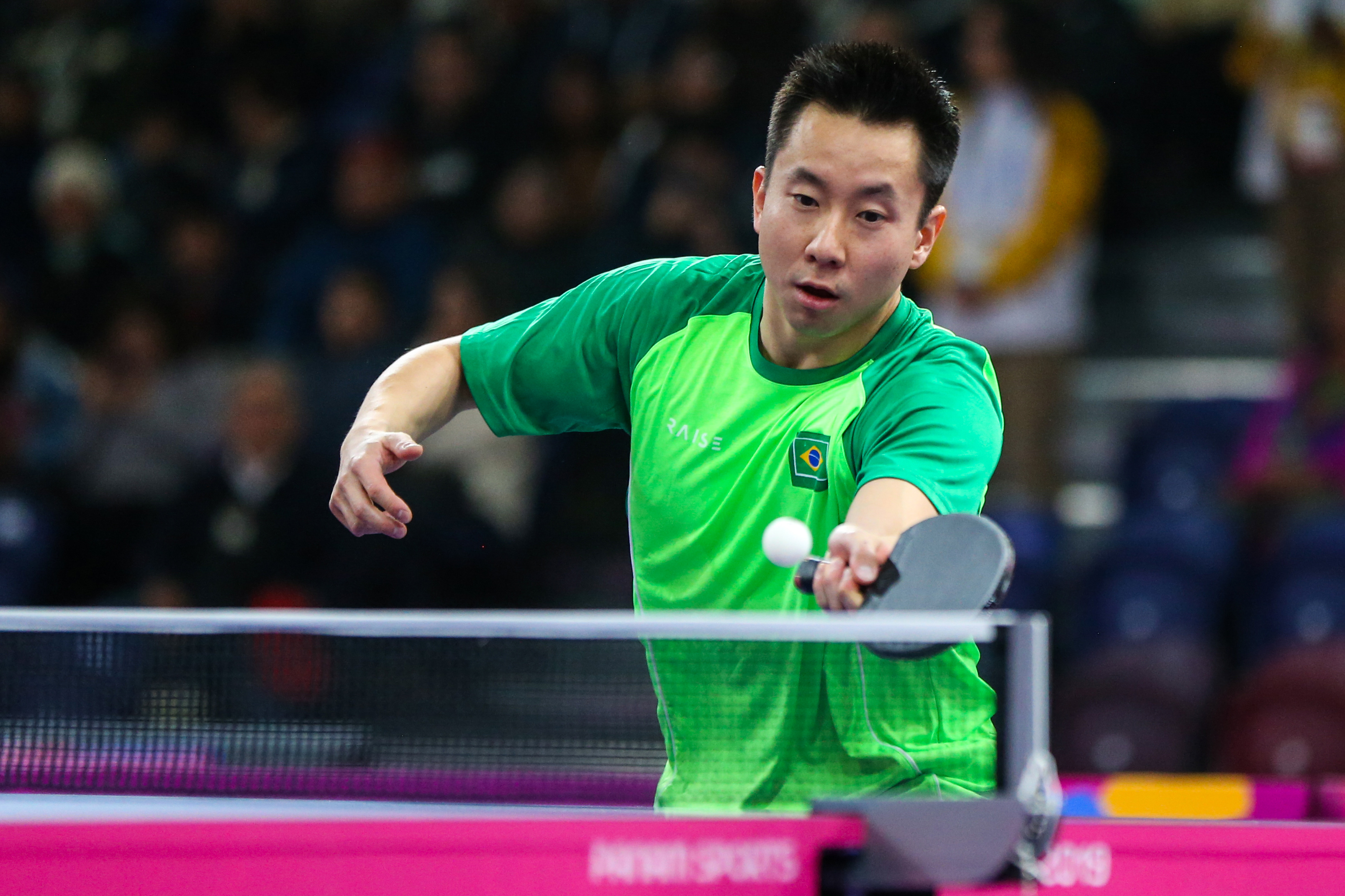
Tsuboi in 2019

=== Singles ===
Tsuboi's best ranking was no.28 in the world in 2019.

- Pan American Table Tennis Championships: Bronze medal (2019)
- Pan American Games: Runner-up (2015)
- WTT Star Contender: Round of 16 (Doha 2021)
- Table Tennis World Cup: Quarterfinals (Halmstad 2015)
- World Table Tennis Championships: Second round (2011, 2013, 2015)
- Olympic Games: Round of 16 (Tokyo 2020)

=== Doubles ===
In 2017, the duo Tsuboi / Calderano was the 3rd best in the world rankings, behind only the Japanese Masataka Morizono and Yuya Oshima and the Chinese Xu Xin and Zhang Jike.

- Pan American Games: Champion (2019)
- Super series: Silver (Qatar Open 2015)
- Hungarian Open 2016: Silver
- Swedish Open 2017: Gold
- Rio de Janeiro Open 2017: Gold
- World Table Tennis Championships: Round of 16 (Yokohama 2009, Suzhou 2015, Dusseldorf 2017)

=== Team ===
From April 2021 to June 2023, the Brazil team was the 6th best in the world.

- Pan American Table Tennis Championships: Champion (2019, 2021)
- Pan American Games: Champion (2007, 2011, 2015)
- Table Tennis World Cup: Quarterfinals (Dubai 2010, Germany 2011, China 2013, Dubai 2015, London 2018, Tokyo 2019)
- World Table Tennis Championships: Quarterfinals (Halmstad 2018)
- Olympic Games: Quarterfinals (Tokyo 2020)
