= Thiago Monteiro =

Thiago Monteiro may refer to:

- Thiago Monteiro (table tennis) (born 1981), Brazilian table tennis player
- Thiago Monteiro (tennis) (born 1994), Brazilian tennis player

== See also ==
- Tiago Monteiro (born 1976), Portuguese racing driver
