= Liu Song (disambiguation) =

The Liu Song dynasty (420–479) was an imperial dynasty of China.

Liu Song is also the name of:

- Liu Song (table tennis) (born 1972), Chinese-born Argentine table tennis player
- Liu Song (snooker player) (born 1983), Chinese snooker player
