= Table tennis at the 2003 Pan American Games =

- Venue: Table tennis center
- Dates: August 7–13

Table tennis competitions at the 2003 Pan American Games in Santo Domingo were held from August 7 to 13, 2003 at the Table tennis center. The winners of the tournament secured a place at the 2004 Summer Olympics.

== Singles ==
Games	Gold	Silver	Bronze
Men's singles	Lin Ju; Dominican Republic	Thiago Monteiro; Brazil	Hugo Hoyama; Brazil
Men's singles	Lin Ju; Dominican Republic	Thiago Monteiro; Brazil	Liu Song; Argentina
Women's singles	Gao Jun; United States	Wu Xue; Dominican Republic	Tawny Banh; United States
Women's singles	Gao Jun; United States	Wu Xue; Dominican Republic	Berta Rodríguez; Chile

== Doubles ==
Games	Gold	Silver	Bronze
Men's doubles	Brazil; Hugo Hoyama; Thiago Monteiro	Brazil; Gustavo Tsuboi; Bruno Anjos	Dominican Republic; Lin Ju; Roberto Brito
Men's doubles	Brazil; Hugo Hoyama; Thiago Monteiro	Brazil; Gustavo Tsuboi; Bruno Anjos	Argentina; Liu Song; Pablo Tabachnik
Women's doubles	United States; Gao Jun; Jasna Fazlić	United States; Lily Yip; Tawny Banh	Venezuela; Fabiola Ramos; Luisana Pérez
Women's doubles	United States; Gao Jun; Jasna Fazlić	United States; Lily Yip; Tawny Banh	Dominican Republic; Wu Xue; Olga Vila

== Medal table ==
Rank	Nation	Gold	Silver	Bronze	Total
1	United States	2	1	1	4
2	Brazil	1	2	1	4
3	Dominican Republic	1	1	2	4
4	Argentina	0	0	2	2
5	Chile	0	0	1	1
5	Venezuela	0	0	1	1
Totals (6 entries)		4	4	8	16

== See also ==
- List of Pan American Games medalists in table tennis
