= Sean O'Neill (table tennis) =

American table tennis player & coach (born 1967)

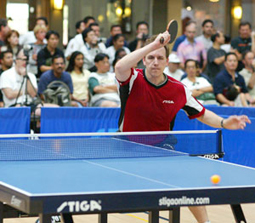
- O'Neill in 2004

Personal information
- Full name: Sean Patrick O'Neill
- Nationality: United States
- Born: July 31, 1967 (age 59) Toledo, Ohio, U.S.

Sport
- Sport: Table tennis
- Playing style: Right-handed, Offensive player
Medal record
Men's table tennis
Representing United States
Pan American Games
| Gold medal – first place | 1983 Caracas | Mixed |
| Gold medal – first place | 1991 Havana | Mixed |
| Silver medal – second place | 1987 Indianapolis | Singles |
| Silver medal – second place | 1987 Indianapolis | Mixed |
| Silver medal – second place | 1987 Indianapolis | Team |
| Silver medal – second place | 1991 Havana | Team |
| Silver medal – second place | 1995 Mar del Plata | Team |
| Bronze medal – third place | 1983 Caracas | Doubles |

Sean Patrick O'Neill (born July 31, 1967) is a five-time U.S. National Men's Singles Champion and is currently a U.S. representative on the International Table Tennis Federation and commentator. As a coach, he has been involved with numerous players who have won national championships and competed for the USA in The Paralympic Games, Pan American Games and other international competitions.

== Senior playing career ==
Throughout his career, O'Neill won five U.S. National men's singles titles, five men's doubles titles, and six mixed doubles titles. He represented the United States in five World Championships, four Pan American Games—earning two gold, five silver, and one bronze medals—and participated in the 1988 and 1992 Olympic Games. In 1990, he clinched the North American Men's Singles Championship. O'Neill was honored as the USA Table Tennis (USATT) Male Athlete of the Year five times and served on the United States Olympic Committee's Athletes' Advisory Council as a player representative.

At the U.S. Olympic Sports Festival, O'Neill amassed 18 gold, five silver, and four bronze medals between 1981 and 1995. Notably, he lit the torch alongside Sharon Cain of Team Handball during the 1993 opening ceremonies in San Antonio. During his junior years, he played for the Ängby Sport Club in Stockholm, Sweden, and trained in China on several occasions.

== Coaching career ==
After retiring from competitive play, O'Neill transitioned into coaching, focusing on U.S. Para Table Tennis. He served as head coach for the U.S. Paralympic Table Tennis teams in 2004, 2008, and 2012, and led teams at the 2002 and 2006 World Championships, as well as the Para Pan American Games/Championships in 2003, 2005, and 2007. In 2005, he was named National Collegiate Coach of the Year while coaching the University of Virginia team and was also recognized as the USA Table Tennis National Coach of the Year. In 2010, he received the USATT Developmental Coach of the Year award.

== Broadcasting and media ==
O'Neill has an extensive background as a table tennis commentator and analyst, primarily known for his long-term association with NBC's Olympic programming. His broadcast work began at the 1988 Seoul Olympics, where he provided technical analysis following his competitive participation in the Games.

== NBC and Olympic Games ==
O'Neill has been an Olympic commentator, providing table tennis event commentary for NBC Olympics since 2004, and currently serves as a color commentator for NBC Olympics. He provided commentary at the 2004 Athens Olympics and every Summer Olympics from Beijing 2008 through Paris 2024. In 2025, NBCUniversal's coverage of the 2024 Paris Olympics received the Sports Emmy Award for Outstanding Live Special – Championship Event, with O'Neill among the event analysts for the coverage.

He also provides commentary for several major international competitions. For example, he provided commentary for NBC Universal Sports' broadcasts of the 2009 and 2010 World Table Tennis Championships, and for One World Sports' broadcasts of the 2015 and 2016 United States National Championships.

== Major League Table Tennis (MLTT) ==
In 2023, O'Neill joined the inaugural broadcast team for Major League Table Tennis (MLTT). He has served as a color commentator for the league's Western Conference during both the 2023–2024 and 2024–2025 seasons. Within this role, O'Neill is responsible for explaining the league's unique format to viewers. This includes:

- The "Golden Game": Providing explanations regarding how teams can strategically shift their tactics in order to win the league's version of a tiebreaker.
- Open Serve Doubles: :: Analyzing the overall strategy behind the use of an open serve doubles format with "open" serving rules that will create faster-paced and more varied rallies than those seen in traditional or legacy doubles formats.
- Player Backgrounds: Providing scouting reports and historical context for the league's roster of players.
- Digital Media: Contributing to league-produced digital content, such as match previews and technical analysis features for the league's official streaming outlets.

== VR Table Tennis ==
The O’Neill has assisted in developing a Virtual Reality (VR) version of Table Tennis that is used for competitive purposes and social interaction. O’Neil works closely with the Virtual Reality Table Tennis Network to assist players through initiatives and structured competitions within this digital environment. As part of Paddle Palace’s management team, O’Neill runs an interactive session each week at the Paddle Palace room on the Eleven Table Tennis Virtual Reality Platform which serves as an intermediary between traditional club based play and the larger online community of digital athletes. . O’Neill also leads the newly formed NCTTA VR Table Tennis committee.

== Administrative roles and honors ==
O'Neill was inducted into the George C. Marshall Hall of Fame in 1998 and the US Table Tennis Hall of Fame in 2007. He served as director of communications for USA Table Tennis from 2014 to 2017 and as high performance director from 2019 to 2021. O'Neill also assisted Josh Safdie on the movie, Marty Supreme with table tennis historical and equipment needs and support. Currently, he works at the Paddle Palace as coach and serves as the director of sponsorships and social media.
