= Wang Chen (table tennis) =

Chinese-American table tennis player

Personal information
- Native name: 王晨
- Nationality: China; United States
- Born: January 17, 1974 (age 52) Shanghai, China

Sport
- Sport: Table tennis
- Playing style: Shakehand
Medal record
Women's table tennis
Representing United States
Pan American Games
Gold medal – first place	2007 Rio de Janeiro	Team
Bronze medal – third place	2007 Rio de Janeiro	Singles

Wang Chen (Chinese: 王晨; pinyin: Wáng Chén; born January 14, 1974) is a retired table tennis player from the United States.

Born in Shanghai, China, she moved to the United States in 2000 and currently resides in New York City. There she met her landlord (Jerry Wartski) who began to sponsor her in tournaments.

She won gold in the team event at the 2007 Pan American Games. Additionally, she competed at the 2008 Summer Olympics, reaching the quarterfinals of the singles competition. She also competed in the team competition, where they were eliminated in round two of the bronze playoff.

She announced her retirement shortly after on August 21, 2008.
