= Victorine Agum Fomum =

Cameroonian table tennis player

Personal information
- Nationality: Cameroon
- Born: 17 June 1974 (age 52) Bamenda, Cameroon
- Height: 1.50 m (4 ft 11 in)
- Weight: 68 kg (150 lb)

Sport
- Sport: Table tennis

Victorine Agum Fomum (born June 17, 1974 in Bamenda) is a Cameroonian table tennis player. Fomum represented Cameroon at the 2008 Summer Olympics in Beijing, where she competed in the women's singles. She lost the first preliminary round match to Dominican Republic's Lian Qian, with a unanimous set score of 0–4.
