= Mariann Domonkos =

Canadian table tennis player

Personal information
- Nationality: Canada
- Born: February 12, 1958 (age 68) Budapest, Hungary

Sport
- Sport: Table tennis
Medal record
Women's table tennis
Representing Canada
Pan American Games
Gold medal – first place	1979 San Juan	Singles
Gold medal – first place	1979 San Juan	Doubles
Gold medal – first place	1979 San Juan	Mixed doubles
Gold medal – first place	1979 San Juan	Team
Silver medal – second place	1983 Caracas	Mixed doubles
Silver medal – second place	1987 Indianapolis	Singles
Silver medal – second place	1987 Indianapolis	Doubles
Bronze medal – third place	1983 Caracas	Doubles
Bronze medal – third place	1983 Caracas	Team
Bronze medal – third place	1987 Indianapolis	Mixed doubles
Bronze medal – third place	1987 Indianapolis	Team

Mariann Domonkos (born February 12, 1958) is a Hungarian-born Canadian table tennis player. She competed in the women's singles event at the 1988 Summer Olympics.
