= Carlos Kawai =

Brazilian table tennis player

Personal information
- Full name: Carlos Issamu Kawai
- Nationality: Brazil
- Born: July 30, 1969 (age 56) Santo André, São Paulo, Brazil

Sport
- Sport: Table tennis
Medal record
Men's table tennis
Representing Brazil
Pan American Games
Gold medal – first place	1987 Indianapolis	Team
Gold medal – first place	1991 Havana	Team
Gold medal – first place	1995 Mar del Plata	Team
Bronze medal – third place	1991 Havana	Doubles
Bronze medal – third place	1999 Winnipeg	Team

Carlos Issamu Kawai (born July 30, 1969) is a Brazilian table tennis player. He competed in men's singles and men's doubles with Claudio Kano at the 1988 Summer Olympics and men's doubles with Hugo Hoyama at the 2000 Summer Olympics.
