= Hugo Hoyama =

Brazilian table tennis player

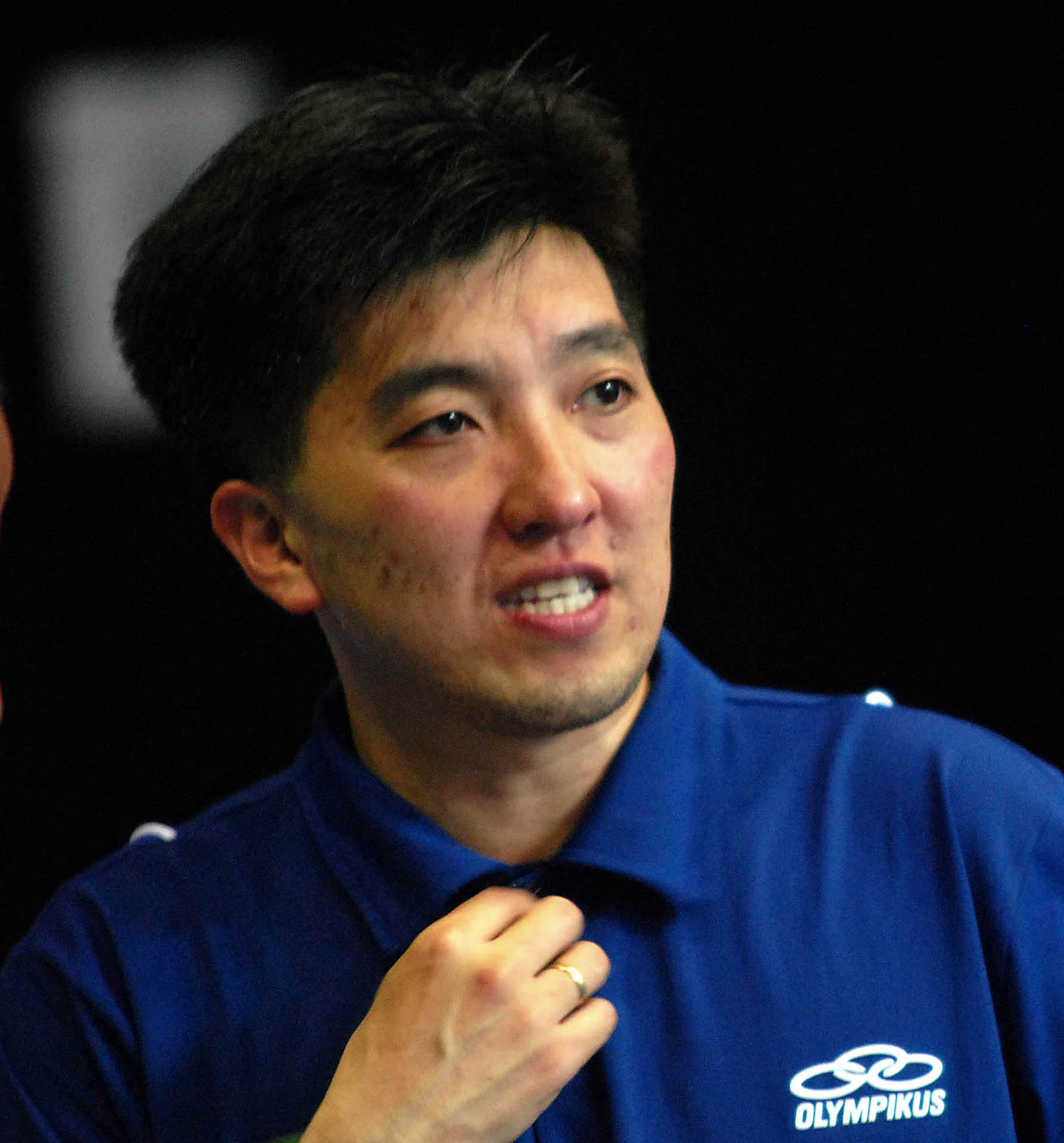

Personal information
- Born: May 9, 1969 (age 57) São Bernardo do Campo, São Paulo, Brazil
- Height: 1.69 m (5 ft 7 in)
- Weight: 68 kg (150 lb)

Sport
- Sport: Table tennis
Medal record
Men's table tennis
Representing Brazil
Pan American Games
Gold medal – first place	1987 Indianapolis	Team
Gold medal – first place	1991 Havana	Singles
Gold medal – first place	1991 Havana	Doubles
Gold medal – first place	1991 Havana	Team
Gold medal – first place	1995 Mar del Plata	Singles
Gold medal – first place	1995 Mar del Plata	Doubles
Gold medal – first place	1995 Mar del Plata	Team
Gold medal – first place	2003 Santo Domingo	Doubles
Gold medal – first place	2007 Rio de Janeiro	Team
Gold medal – first place	2011 Guadalajara	Team
Silver medal – second place	1987 Indianapolis	Doubles
Bronze medal – third place	1995 Mar del Plata	Mixed Doubles
Bronze medal – third place	1999 Winnipeg	Team
Bronze medal – third place	2003 Santo Domingo	Singles
Bronze medal – third place	2007 Rio de Janeiro	Singles
Latin American Championships
Gold medal – first place	1990 Sancti Spiritus	Team
Gold medal – first place	1992 Havana	Singles
Gold medal – first place	1994 Sancti Spiritus	Singles
Gold medal – first place	1994 Sancti Spiritus	Doubles
Gold medal – first place	1994 Sancti Spiritus	Team
Gold medal – first place	1996 Mexico City	Singles
Gold medal – first place	1996 Mexico City	Doubles
Gold medal – first place	1998 Mexico City	Doubles
Gold medal – first place	2000 Coquimbo	Singles
Gold medal – first place	2000 Coquimbo	Doubles
Gold medal – first place	2000 Coquimbo	Mixed Doubles
Gold medal – first place	2000 Coquimbo	Team
Gold medal – first place	2002 Santo Domingo	Singles
Gold medal – first place	2002 Santo Domingo	Doubles
Gold medal – first place	2002 Santo Domingo	Team
Gold medal – first place	2003 El Salvador	Doubles
Gold medal – first place	2004 Valvidia	Mixed Doubles
Gold medal – first place	2004 Valvidia	Team
Gold medal – first place	2005 Punta Del Este	Team
Gold medal – first place	2006 Medellin	Doubles
Gold medal – first place	2007 Guarulhos	Doubles
Gold medal – first place	2007 Guarulhos	Team
Gold medal – first place	2008 Santo Domingo	Team
Gold medal – first place	2009 San Salvador	Doubles
Gold medal – first place	2009 San Salvador	Team
Gold medal – first place	2010 Cancun	Doubles
Gold medal – first place	2010 Cancun	Team
Silver medal – second place	1989 Las Tunas	Singles
Silver medal – second place	1989 Las Tunas	Doubles
Silver medal – second place	1990 Sancti Spiritus	Singles
Silver medal – second place	1992 Havana	Doubles
Silver medal – second place	1996 Mexico City	Team
Silver medal – second place	1998 Mexico City	Singles
Silver medal – second place	1998 Mexico City	Team
Silver medal – second place	2004 Valvidia	Singles
Silver medal – second place	2005 Punta Del Este	Mixed Doubles
Silver medal – second place	2006 Medellin	Singles
Silver medal – second place	2006 Medellin	Team
Silver medal – second place	2009 San Salvador	Singles
Bronze medal – third place	2007 Guarulhos	Singles
Bronze medal – third place	2010 Cancun	Singles
South American Games
Gold medal – first place	2006 B.Aires	Doubles
Gold medal – first place	2006 B.Aires	Team
Gold medal – first place	2010 Medellín	Team
Silver medal – second place	2010 Medellín	Doubles
Bronze medal – third place	2006 B.Aires	Singles

Hugo Hoyama (born May 9, 1969) is a retired Brazilian table tennis player of Japanese origin who has won several medals in single, double and team events in the Pan American Games and in the Latin American Championships. He competed in six editions of the Olympic Games in his career, between Barcelona 1992 and London 2012, and seven Pan American Games, from Indianapolis 1987 to Guadalajara 2011. Along with Gustavo Tsuboi and Thiago Monteiro, Hoyama was part of the winning team at the 2007 Pan American Games and 2011 Pan American Games.

== Career ==
Born in São Bernardo do Campo, São Paulo, Hoyama broke the Brazilian record of most gold medals in the Pan American Games, which used to belong to the Brazilian swimmer Gustavo Borges and participated in every Olympic game since debuting as an Olympian at the 1992 Olympic Games and competed in the 2012 Olympic Games, where he plans to retire as an Olympian.

At the 1996 Atlanta Olympics, reaching the round of 16 and finishing in ninth place in the competition, beating world champion Jorgen Persson of Sweden along the way, Hoyama posted the best result in Brazilian tennis table history at the Olympics. He was only surpassed in 2020 by Hugo Calderano, who reached the quarterfinals.

In 2007, Hoyama was invited by Carlos Nuzman from the Brazilian Olympic Committee to be the flag bearer for Brazil at the 2011 Pan American Games in Guadalajara. According to Nuzman, the choice of Hoyama displays support from the committee to all sports that Brazilians play.

Hugo is the founder of the Hugo Hoyama Foundation. Other than his native Portuguese, Hoyama also speaks English, his heritage language of Japanese and Spanish.

== In popular culture ==
Hoyama is briefly mentioned in the eighth episode of the fourth season of The Office American TV series. Table tennis plays a major role in the plot and Dwight Schrute says he even has a life-size poster of Hugo Hoyama in his room.

== See also ==
- List of table tennis players
