= Horatio Pintea =

Canadian table tennis player

Personal information
- Nationality: Canada
- Born: November 11, 1962 (age 63) Oradea, Romania

Sport
- Sport: Table tennis
Medal record
Men's table tennis
Representing Canada
Pan American Games
Gold medal – first place	1995 Mar del Plata	Mixed Doubles
Gold medal – first place	1987 Indianapolis	Doubles
Silver medal – second place	1983 Caracas	Mixed doubles
Silver medal – second place	1983 Caracas	Team
Silver medal – second place	1991 Havana	Doubles
Bronze medal – third place	1987 Indianapolis	Team
Bronze medal – third place	1991 Havana	Singles
Bronze medal – third place	1991 Havana	Team
Bronze medal – third place	1995 Mar del Plata	Singles
Bronze medal – third place	1995 Mar del Plata	Doubles
Bronze medal – third place	1995 Mar del Plata	Team
Bronze medal – third place	1999 Winnipeg	Team

Horatio Pintea (born November 11, 1962) was a Canadian table tennis player. Originally from Romania, Pintea arrived in Canada in 1982. He represented Canada in international competition from 1982 until 2001. During his time on the National Team he participated in all major competitions in the world including the 1988 and 1996 Olympics as well as numerous World Championships, World Cups (teams, singles and doubles), and represented Canada in five Pan American Games over a 20-year period, and managed to capture at least one medal in each.

Since 2008, Pintea and Geng Lijuan have been coaching on a regular basis at the Geng Table Tennis Academy, working with kids from 6 years of age to 15.
