= Insook Bhushan =

American table tennis player (born 1952)

Personal information
- Full name: Insook Bhushan
- Nationality: United States
- Born: February 17, 1952 (age 74) Seoul, South Korea

Sport
- Sport: Table tennis
- Playing style: Shakehand, defensive
Medal record
Women's table tennis
Representing United States
Pan American Games
Gold medal – first place	1983 Caracas	Singles
Gold medal – first place	1983 Caracas	Doubles
Gold medal – first place	1983 Caracas	Mixed doubles
Gold medal – first place	1983 Caracas	Team
Gold medal – first place	1987 Indianapolis	Singles
Gold medal – first place	1987 Indianapolis	Mixed doubles
Gold medal – first place	1987 Indianapolis	Team
Gold medal – first place	1991 Havana	Singles
Gold medal – first place	1991 Havana	Team
Silver medal – second place	1991 Havana	Doubles

- Insook Na Bhushan
- Hangul: 나인숙
- Hanja: 羅仁淑
- RR: Na Insuk
- MR: Na Insuk

Insook Bhushan (born Na In-Sook; February 17, 1952) is a South Korea-born American table tennis player. She was a member of the South Korean women's team that won the bronze medal at the 1971 World Championships. At the 1973 World Championships, she was limited to the role of "non-playing captain" of the gold medal-winning South Korean women's team. In 1974, she emigrated to the United States, where her father had established an import-export business. The following year, she married the architect Shekhar Bhushan and in 1980 became a US citizen.

Between 1976 and 1991, Bhushan dominated the US National Championships, winning the title in women's singles 11 times, women's doubles 11 times, and mixed doubles 8 times. In 1977, she won the women's singles title at the US Open.

Bhushan returned to her birthplace for the 1988 Olympics, where she competed in women's singles and women's doubles. She also competed in women's singles at the 1992 Olympics and represented the United States in 6 World Championships. She participated in 3 Pan American Games, winning 8 gold medals (including 3 consecutive gold medals in women's singles) and 1 silver medal.

Bhushan retired from competition after the 1992 Olympics and was inducted into the USATT Hall of Fame in 1993.

Bhushan has a degree in accounting from the University of Colorado Denver and works as an accountant in the Colorado Department of Military and Veterans Affairs. She has two sons, Austin (born in 1980) and Kevin (born in 1985).
