= Table tennis at the 2007 Pan American Games =

Table tennis competitions at the 2007 Pan American Games in Rio de Janeiro were held in July 2007 at the Riocentro Sports Complex.

== Singles ==
Games	Gold	Silver	Bronze
Men's singles	Lin Ju; Dominican Republic	Liu Song; Argentina	Hugo Hoyama; Brazil
Men's singles	Lin Ju; Dominican Republic	Liu Song; Argentina	Thiago Monteiro; Brazil
Women's singles	Gao Jun; United States	Wu Xue; Dominican Republic	Wang Chen; United States
Women's singles	Gao Jun; United States	Wu Xue; Dominican Republic	Judy Long; Canada

== Team ==
Games	Gold	Silver	Bronze
Men's team	Brazil; Hugo Hoyama; Thiago Monteiro; Gustavo Tsuboi	Argentina; Liu Song; Pablo Tabachnik; Juan Frery	Canada; Pierre-Luc Hinse; Shen Qiang; Pradeeban Peter-Paul
Men's team	Brazil; Hugo Hoyama; Thiago Monteiro; Gustavo Tsuboi	Argentina; Liu Song; Pablo Tabachnik; Juan Frery	United States; Mark Hazinski; Eric Owens; Han Xiao
Women's team	United States; Gao Jun; Wang Chen; Tawny Banh	Canada; Judy Long; Zhang Mo; Chris Xu	Cuba; Glendys Gonzalez; Dayana Ferrer; Anisleyvis Bereau
Women's team	United States; Gao Jun; Wang Chen; Tawny Banh	Canada; Judy Long; Zhang Mo; Chris Xu	Dominican Republic; Johenny Valdez; Wu Xue; Lian Qian

== Medal table ==
Rank	Nation	Gold	Silver	Bronze	Total
1	United States	2	0	2	4
2	Dominican Republic	1	1	1	3
3	Brazil	1	0	2	3
4	Argentina	0	2	0	2
5	Canada	0	1	2	3
6	Cuba	0	0	1	1
Totals (6 entries)		4	4	8	16

== See also ==
- List of Pan American Games medalists in table tennis
