= Table tennis at the Pan American Games =

- No. of events: 7 (men: 3; women: 3; mixed: 1)

Table tennis has been held at the Pan American Games since the 1979 Pan American Games in San Juan, Puerto Rico.

== Events ==
Event	1979	1983	1987	1991	1995	1999	2003	2007	2011	2015	2019	2023
Men's singles	•	•	•	•	•	•	•	•	•	•	•	•
Men's doubles	•	•	•	•	•		•				•	•
Men's team	•	•	•	•	•	•		•	•	•	•	•
Women's singles	•	•	•	•	•	•	•	•	•	•	•	•
Women's doubles	•	•	•	•	•		•				•	•
Women's team	•	•	•	•	•	•		•	•	•	•	•
Mixed doubles	•	•	•	•	•						•	•
Events	7	7	7	7	7	4	4	4	4	4	7	7

== Medal table ==
Updated after the 2023 Pan American Games.

Rank	Nation	Gold	Silver	Bronze	Total
1	United States	25	12	18	55
2	Brazil	18	15	17	50
3	Canada	8	9	27	44
4	Puerto Rico	4	1	6	11
5	Cuba	3	8	12	23
6	Dominican Republic	3	5	8	16
7	Argentina	1	8	4	13
8	Chile	0	1	12	13
9	Venezuela	0	1	5	6
10	Mexico	0	1	2	3
11	Paraguay	0	1	0	1
12	Ecuador	0	0	2	2
12	Peru	0	0	2	2
14	Colombia	0	0	1	1
Totals (14 entries)		62	62	116	240
