= Oscar Gonzales (table tennis) =

Argentine table tennis player

Oscar Gonzales is an Argentine table tennis player who played in the 2004 Summer Olympics with Pablo Tabachnik.

== See also ==
- Table Tennis at the 2004 Summer Olympics
