= Mariany Nonaka =

Brazilian table tennis player (born 1988)

Personal information
- Full name: Mariany Mayumi Nonaka
- Born: 22 February 1988 (age 38) São Paulo, Brazil
- Height: 1.64 m (5 ft 5 in)
- Weight: 57 kg (126 lb)

Sport
- Sport: Table tennis
- Club: Acrepa Sao Bernardo
- Playing style: Right-handed, shakehand
- Highest ranking: 258 (April 2009)
- Current ranking: 406 (March 2012)

Mariany Mayumi Nonaka (born 22 February 1988) is a Brazilian table tennis player. As of March 2012, Nonaka is ranked no. 406 in the world by the International Table Tennis Federation (ITTF). She is a member of Acrepa Sao Bernardo Sports Club, and is coached and trained by Mauricio Kobayashi. Nonaka is also right-handed, and uses the attacking, shakehand grip.

Nonaka made her official debut, as a 16-year-old, at the 2004 Summer Olympics in Athens, where she competed only in the women's doubles. Playing with her partner Lígia Silva, Nonaka received a bye for the first round, before losing out to the Czech duo, Renáta Štrbíková and Alena Vachovcová, with a set score of 2–4.

Four years after competing in her first Olympics, Nonaka qualified for her second Brazilian team, as a 20-year-old and a lone female table tennis player, at the 2008 Summer Olympics in Beijing, by receiving a spot from the Latin American Qualification Tournament in Santo Domingo, Dominican Republic. She lost the preliminary round match of the women's singles to Lithuania's Rūta Paškauskienė, with a unanimous set score of 0–4.
