= Gao Jun =

Chinese-American table tennis player

Personal information
- Nationality: United States
- Born: January 25, 1969 (age 57) Hebei, China
- Height: 1.69 m (5 ft 7 in)
- Weight: 75 kg (11.8 st; 165 lb)

Sport
- Sport: Table tennis
- Playing style: Penhold
- Equipment: Butterfly
- Highest ranking: 7
Medal record
Women's table tennis
Representing China
Olympic Games
Silver medal – second place	1992 Barcelona	Doubles
World Championships
Gold medal – first place	1991 Chiba	Doubles
Gold medal – first place	1993 Gothenburg	Team
Silver medal – second place	1991 Chiba	Team
Bronze medal – third place	1989 Dortmund	Doubles
Bronze medal – third place	1989 Dortmund	Mixed Doubles
Bronze medal – third place	1993 Gothenburg	Singles
Bronze medal – third place	1993 Gothenburg	Doubles
Representing United States
Pan American Games
Gold medal – first place	1999 Winnipeg	Team
Gold medal – first place	2003 Santo Domingo	Singles
Gold medal – first place	2003 Santo Domingo	Doubles
Gold medal – first place	2007 Rio de Janeiro	Singles
Gold medal – first place	2007 Rio de Janeiro	Team

Gao Jun (Chinese: 高军; pinyin: Gāo jūn; born January 25, 1969) is a Chinese American table tennis player.

== Biography ==
Gao Jun was born in Baoding, Hebei province, China. She now resides in Southern California and is the owner of the California Table Tennis club in Rosemead, CA.

She won a silver medal at the 1992 Summer Olympics in the women's doubles event, with Chen Zihe for the Chinese National Team. She moved to the U.S. in 1994 and became a U.S. citizen. Gao competed for the United States in three consecutive Olympic Games from 2000 to 2008. In 2009, she was inducted into the USATT Hall of Fame.

Gao is a nine-time U.S. women's champion and has won eleven U.S. national titles in women's doubles and eight titles in mixed doubles with various partners. She was ranked number 1 in the U.S. prior to the 2012 London Olympics but withdrew from the North American Olympic trials due to an injury.

== See also ==
- List of table tennis players
- List of World Table Tennis Championships medalists
