= Wu Xue =

Dominican Republic table tennis player

Personal information
- Full name: Wu Xue
- Nationality: Dominican Republic
- Born: 22 March 1980 (age 46) Ürümqi, Xinjiang, China

Sport
- Sport: Table tennis
Medal record
Women's table tennis
Representing the Dominican Republic
Pan American Games
Gold medal – first place	2011 Guadalajara	Team
Silver medal – second place	2003 Santo Domingo	Singles
Silver medal – second place	2007 Rio de Janeiro	Singles
Silver medal – second place	2011 Guadalajara	Singles
Bronze medal – third place	2003 Santo Domingo	Doubles
Bronze medal – third place	2007 Rio de Janeiro	Team
Central American and Caribbean Games
Gold medal – first place	2006 Cartagena	Singles
Gold medal – first place	2006 Cartagena	Doubles
Gold medal – first place	2006 Cartagena	Mixed Doubles
Gold medal – first place	2006 Cartagena	Team
Gold medal – first place	2010 Mayagüez	Singles
Gold medal – first place	2010 Mayagüez	Mixed Doubles
Silver medal – second place	2010 Mayagüez	Doubles
Bronze medal – third place	2010 Mayagüez	Team
Latin American Table Tennis Cup
Gold medal – first place	Rio de Janeiro 2011	Singles
Latin American Championships
Gold medal – first place	2004 Valvidia	Singles
Gold medal – first place	2007 Guarulhos	Singles
Gold medal – first place	2007 Guarulhos	Mixed Doubles
Gold medal – first place	2008 Santo Domingo	Singles
Gold medal – first place	2008 Santo Domingo	Doubles
Gold medal – first place	2008 Santo Domingo	Mixed Doubles
Gold medal – first place	2008 Santo Domingo	Team
Gold medal – first place	2011 Guadalajara	Singles
Bronze medal – third place	2004 Valvidia	Doubles

Wu Xue (born 22 March 1980) is a female Chinese-born table tennis player who now represents the Dominican Republic.

She competed at the 2008 Summer Olympics, reaching the quarterfinals of the singles competition. She also competed in the team competition.
