= Judy Long =

Canadian table tennis player

Personal information
- Born: 15 January 1969 (age 57) Beijing, China

Sport
- Sport: Table tennis
Medal record
Women's table tennis
Representing Canada
Pan American Games
Silver medal – second place	2007 Rio de Janeiro	Team
Bronze medal – third place	2007 Rio de Janeiro	Singles

Zhu "Judy" Long (born 15 January 1969) is a female Chinese-born table tennis player who now represents Canada. She was born in Beijing, and resides in Ottawa, Ontario.
