= Joe Ng =

Canadian table tennis player

Personal information
- Full name: Gideon Joseph Ng
- Nationality: Canada
- Born: November 15, 1963 (age 63) Toronto, Ontario, Canada

Sport
- Sport: Table tennis
- Playing style: Shakehand
Medal record
Men's table tennis
Representing Canada
Pan American Games
Gold medal – first place	1987 Indianapolis	Singles
Gold medal – first place	1987 Indianapolis	Doubles
Silver medal – second place	1983 Caracas	Team
Silver medal – second place	1991 Havana	Doubles
Bronze medal – third place	1987 Indianapolis	Mixed doubles
Bronze medal – third place	1987 Indianapolis	Team
Bronze medal – third place	1995 Mar del Plata	Doubles
Bronze medal – third place	1995 Mar del Plata	Mixed doubles
Bronze medal – third place	1995 Mar del Plata	Team

Gideon Joseph Ng (born November 15, 1963) is a Chinese-Canadian table tennis player.

He competed at the 1988 (men's singles and doubles), 1992 (men's singles), and 1996 Summer Olympics (men's singles and doubles).
