= Walt Nathan =

Peruvian table tennis player

Personal information
- Nationality: Peru
- Born: 3 April 1962 (age 64) Lima, Peru

Sport
- Sport: Table tennis
Medal record
Men's table tennis
Representing Peru
Pan American Games
Bronze medal – third place	1983 Caracas	Men's singles

Walter Nathan Levy (born 3 April 1962) is a Peruvian former international table tennis player.

Nathan was a singles bronze medalist at the 1983 Pan American Games. He represented Peru at the 1992 Summer Olympics in Barcelona, where he partnered his brother Yair in the doubles event.
