= Alejandro Rodríguez (table tennis) =

Chilean table tennis player (born 1978)

Personal information
- Nationality: Chilean
- Born: 13 July 1978 (age 46)

Sport
- Sport: Table tennis

Alejandro Rodríguez (born 13 July 1978) is a Chilean table tennis player. He competed in the men's doubles event at the 2004 Summer Olympics.
