= Ricardo Inokuchi =

Brazilian table tennis player

Personal information
- Full name: Inokuchi Tetuo Ricardo
- Nationality: Brazil

Sport
- Sport: Table tennis
Medal record
Men's table tennis
Representing Brazil
Pan American Games
Gold medal – first place	1983 Caracas	Doubles
Gold medal – first place	1983 Caracas	Team
Silver medal – second place	1983 Caracas	Singles

Ricardo Inokuchi is a Brazilian table tennis player.
