= Cláudio Kano =

Brazilian table tennis player

Personal information
- Full name: Cláudio Mitsuhiro Kano
- Nationality: Brazil
- Born: 18 December 1965 São Paulo, Brazil
- Died: 1 July 1996 (aged 30) São Paulo, Brazil

Sport
- Sport: Table tennis
Medal record
Men's table tennis
Representing Brazil
Pan American Games
Gold medal – first place	1983 Caracas	Doubles
Gold medal – first place	1983 Caracas	Team
Gold medal – first place	1987 Indianapolis	Team
Gold medal – first place	1991 Havana	Doubles
Gold medal – first place	1991 Havana	Team
Gold medal – first place	1995 Mar del Plata	Doubles
Gold medal – first place	1995 Mar del Plata	Team
Silver medal – second place	1987 Indianapolis	Doubles
Silver medal – second place	1991 Havana	Singles
Silver medal – second place	1995 Mar del Plata	Singles
Bronze medal – third place	1983 Caracas	Mixed doubles
Bronze medal – third place	1987 Indianapolis	Singles
Latin American Championships
Gold medal – first place	1989 Las Tunas	Singles
Gold medal – first place	1990 Sancti Spiritus	Singles
Gold medal – first place	1990 Sancti Spiritus	Team
Gold medal – first place	1991 Camagûey	Singles
Gold medal – first place	1994 Sancti Spiritus	Doubles
Gold medal – first place	1994 Sancti Spiritus	Team

Cláudio Mitsuhiro Kano (18 December 1965 – 1 July 1996) was a Japanese Brazilian table tennis player who helped popularize the sport in Brazil and "spearheaded Brazilian table tennis in the 1990s".

== Career ==
Aged 17, he shared two gold medal, in men's doubles and men's team, at the 1983 Pan American Games. He went on to win five more golds, three silvers, and two bronze at later Pan American Games.

At the 1987 World Table Tennis Championships held in New Delhi, Kano reached the round of 16, one of the best results in Brazil's history in the tournament, equaling Ubiraci Rodrigues da Costa, known as Biriba, who fell in the round of 16 in 1961, a result only surpassed by Hugo Calderano later, in 2021.

Kano also achieved two impressive results at the Table Tennis World Cup: he placed sixth in the ITTF World Cup, in Macau, in 1987, and in Nairobi, Kenya, in 1989.

He had participated in the Summer Olympic Games of 1988 and 1992, but lost in the first stages of both.

There were only 18 days left before the opening of the Atlanta Olympic Games (1996), in which Kano was to participate as one of the favorites for the gold medal, when Kano was the victim of a traffic accident in São Paulo. Kano was driving a motorbike when he was closed in by a car. He hit the guardrail and died at the age of 30. Kano won six South American titles in his life and was, until then, the biggest medalist in the history of Brazil at the Pan American Games, with 12 medals, a mark that was surpassed by Hugo Hoyama, at the Pan American Games in Rio, in 2007.

Kano became one of the top 40 in the world rankings.
