= Geng Lijuan =

Chinese table tennis player

Personal information
- Nationality: China Canada
- Born: 15 January 1963 (age 63) Hebei Province, China
- Height: 5 ft 2 in (157 cm)
- Weight: 123 lb (56 kg)

Sport
- Sport: Table tennis
Medal record
Women's table tennis
Representing China
World Championships
Gold medal – first place	1983 Tokyo	Team
Gold medal – first place	1985 Gothenburg	Doubles
Gold medal – first place	1985 Gothenburg	Team
Gold medal – first place	1987 New Delhi	Mixed
Silver medal – second place	1983 Tokyo	Doubles
Silver medal – second place	1985 Gothenburg	Singles
Representing Canada
Pan American Games
Gold medal – first place	1995 Mar del Plata	Singles
Gold medal – first place	1995 Mar del Plata	Doubles
Gold medal – first place	1995 Mar del Plata	Mixed Doubles
Gold medal – first place	1995 Mar del Plata	Team
Silver medal – second place	1999 Winnipeg	Singles
Silver medal – second place	1999 Winnipeg	Team

Geng Lijuan (Chinese: 耿丽娟; born January 15, 1963) is a Chinese-Canadian table tennis player. She is a four-time World Champion, former World #1 and member of the Chinese National Team.

Geng retired from the Chinese national team before the 1988 Seoul Olympics, and married her mixed doubles partner in the world championships, a Romanian table tennis player who had emigrated to Canada. She moved to Canada in 1989, then played professionally in a German club for four years.

She returned to Ottawa in 1994, bought a pizza shop with her husband, and expanded it to three shops. She plays table tennis in her spare time and represented Canada internationally in the 1996 and 2000 Olympic Games. Her career includes winning numerous international Open tournaments such as the French Open, US Open, Italian Open, and German Open. She was a multi-gold medallist at the Pan American Games and many times Canadian and North American Champion.

After she stopped competing, she established the Geng Table Tennis Academy. Jimmy Pintea, Sonia Qin, Andrea Liu, Ly Quan Li, and Shannon Zheng have worked with Geng at the academy. In 2010 Lijuan was the coach of the National Team players at the National Training Center in Ottawa.
