= Khoa Dinh Nguyen =

American table tennis player (born 1966)

Personal information
- Born: October 9, 1966 (age 59) Nha Trang, Vietnam

Sport
- Sport: Table tennis

Khoa Dinh Nguyen (born October 9, 1966) is an American table tennis player. He competed at the 2000 Summer Olympics and the 2004 Summer Olympics.
