= Juan Salamanca =

Chilean table tennis player

Personal information
- Nationality: Chilean
- Born: 6 March 1967 (age 58)

Sport
- Sport: Table tennis

Juan Salamanca (born 6 March 1967) is a Chilean table tennis player. He competed in the men's doubles event at the 1996 Summer Olympics.
