= Raymundo Fermín =

Dominican Republic table tennis player

Personal information
- Nationality: Dominican
- Born: 15 March 1961 (age 64)

Sport
- Sport: Table tennis

Raymundo Fermín (born 15 March 1961) is a Dominican Republic table tennis player. He competed in the men's singles and the men's doubles events at the 1988 Summer Olympics.
