= Mónica Liyau =

Peruvian table tennis player

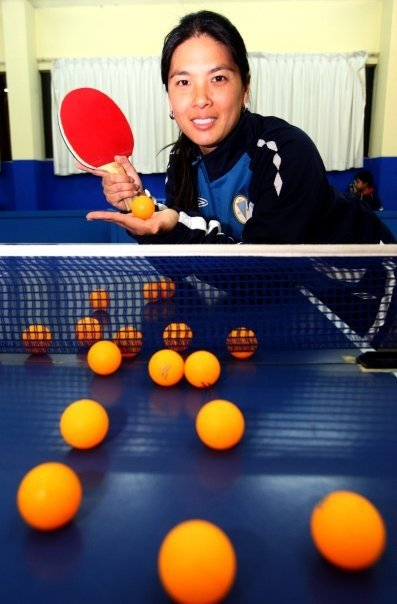

Personal information
- Born: 18 August 1967 (age 57); Lima, Peru

Sport
- Sport: Table tennis

Mónica Liyau (born 18 August 1967) is a Peruvian table tennis player. She competed in the women's singles event at the 1988 Summer Olympics.
