= Pablo Tabachnik =

Argentine table tennis player (born 1977)

Personal information
- Full name: Pablo Ariel Tabachnik
- Born: 20 November 1977 (age 48) San Juan, Argentina
- Height: 1.83 m (6 ft 0 in)

Sport
- Sport: Table tennis
Medal record
Men's table tennis
Representing Argentina
Pan American Games
Silver medal – second place	1995 Mar del Plata	Doubles
Silver medal – second place	1999 Winnipeg	Team
Silver medal – second place	2007 Rio de Janeiro	Team
Silver medal – second place	2011 Guadalajara	Team
Silver medal – second place	2019 Lima	Team
Bronze medal – third place	2003 Santo Domingo	Doubles

Pablo Ariel Tabachnik (born November 20, 1977, in San Juan, Argentina) is an Argentinian table tennis player. He competed in the 2004 Summer Olympics with Oscar Gonzalez. He is a three-time Olympian (2000, 2004, and 2008).

== See also ==
- List of select Jewish table tennis players
