= Liu Song (table tennis) =

Argentine table tennis player

Personal information
- Full name: Liu Song
- Nationality: Argentina
- Born: 12 May 1972 (age 54) Guangxi, China
- Height: 1.70 m (5 ft 7 in)
- Weight: 60 kg (132 lb)

Sport
- Sport: Table tennis
Medal record
Men's table tennis
Representing Argentina
Pan American Games
Gold medal – first place	2011 Guadalajara	Single
Silver medal – second place	1999 Winnipeg	Single
Silver medal – second place	1999 Winnipeg	Team
Silver medal – second place	2007 Rio de Janeiro	Single
Silver medal – second place	2007 Rio de Janeiro	Team
Silver medal – second place	2011 Guadalajara	Team
Bronze medal – third place	2003 Santo Domingo	Single
Bronze medal – third place	2003 Santo Domingo	Doubles
Latin American Table Tennis Cup
Silver medal – second place	San Jose 2012	Singles
Bronze medal – third place	Rio de Janeiro 2011	Singles
Latin American Championships
Gold medal – first place	1998 Mexico City	Singles
Gold medal – first place	2003 El Salvador	Singles
Gold medal – first place	2004 Valvidia	Doubles
Gold medal – first place	2005 Punta Del Este	Doubles
Gold medal – first place	2006 Medellin	Singles
Gold medal – first place	2006 Medellin	Team
Gold medal – first place	2007 Guarulhos	Singles
Gold medal – first place	2008 Santo Domingo	Doubles
Gold medal – first place	2010 Cancun	Singles
Gold medal – first place	2011 Guadalajara	Doubles
Silver medal – second place	2000 Coquimbo	Singles
Silver medal – second place	2000 Coquimbo	Team
Silver medal – second place	2003 El Salvador	Doubles
Silver medal – second place	2004 Valvidia	Team
Silver medal – second place	2005 Punta Del Este	Singles
Silver medal – second place	2005 Punta Del Este	Team
Silver medal – second place	2006 Medellin	Doubles
Silver medal – second place	2007 Guarulhos	Doubles
Silver medal – second place	2007 Guarulhos	Team
Silver medal – second place	2008 Santo Domingo	Team
Silver medal – second place	2010 Cancun	Team
Bronze medal – third place	1998 Mexico City	Doubles
Bronze medal – third place	2000 Coquimbo	Doubles
Bronze medal – third place	2002 Santo Domingo	Singles
Bronze medal – third place	2004 Valvidia	Singles
Bronze medal – third place	2008 Santo Domingo	Singles

Liu Song (simplified Chinese: 刘松; traditional Chinese: 劉松; pinyin: Liú Sōng) is a male table tennis player from Argentina. From 1998 to 2011 he won several medals in singles, doubles, and team events in the Latin American Table Tennis Championships.

== Biography ==
=== Personal life ===
Born in Guangxi, China he started practising table tennis at the age of nine. He studied in a special school for athletes and reached eighth place in China's national ranking. Between 1990 and 1994 he was a part of China's national team, and he won the national junior single's championship in 1991. In 1986 he started studying marketing in the University of Tokyo, although he dropped it after a year after deciding to go to Argentina. In 1990 his family moved to Argentina, living in Floresta, a neighborhood in Buenos Aires city, where they opened a laundry. Five years later, Song followed his family. He adopted Argentinian nationality, the country that he always represented at international level, and he started training in the Centro Nacional de Alto Rendimiento Deportivo.

=== International career ===
His first big accomplishment was in 1995 in Brazil's Open; in 1996 he reached the semi-finals of the US Open, in the United States. He won all the Argentinian championships between 1995 and 2001, but in 1997 he started to alternate his place of residence between Argentina and Europe to play professionally. In the season of 1997/98 he was the team's champion in Germany's second division; after that he played in Croatia, where he was the team's champion in the first division in 1999 and 2001, and he won the European Championship team's in 2000 and 2001 playing for Zagreb. Then he went to Bordeaux, France, where he lives since 2001, playing for local team SAG Cestas in France's first division. Liu won the bronze medal in the 2011 Latin American Cup held in Rio de Janeiro, Brazil, after being defeated by Brazil's Gustavo Tsuboi 4–3. Almost at the end of his career, being 39 years old, he won the singles' gold medal at the 2011 Pan American Games in Guadalajara, Mexico, by beating Mexico's Marcos Madrid in the final.

== See also ==
- List of table tennis players
