= Rubén Arado =

Cuban table tennis player (born 1970)

Personal information
- Born: 11 October 1970 (age 54); Havana, Cuba

Sport
- Sport: Table tennis

Rubén Arado (born 11 October 1970) is a Cuban table tennis player. He competed at the 1992 Summer Olympics and the 2000 Summer Olympics.
