= Mario Álvarez (table tennis) =

Dominican Republic table tennis player

Personal information
- Full name: Mario Virgilio Álvarez Soto
- Nationality: Dominican
- Born: 5 August 1960 (age 64); Santo Domingo, Dominican Republic

Sport
- Sport: Table tennis

Mario Virgilio Álvarez Soto (born 5 August 1960) is a Dominican Republic table tennis player. He competed in the men's singles and the men's doubles events at the 1988 Summer Olympics.
