= Leticia Suárez =

Cuban table tennis player

Personal information
- Nationality: Cuban
- Born: 10 February 1969 (age 56)

Sport
- Sport: Table tennis

Leticia Suárez (born 10 February 1969) is a Cuban table tennis player. She competed in the women's doubles event at the 2000 Summer Olympics.
