= Thiago Monteiro (table tennis) =

Brazilian table tennis player

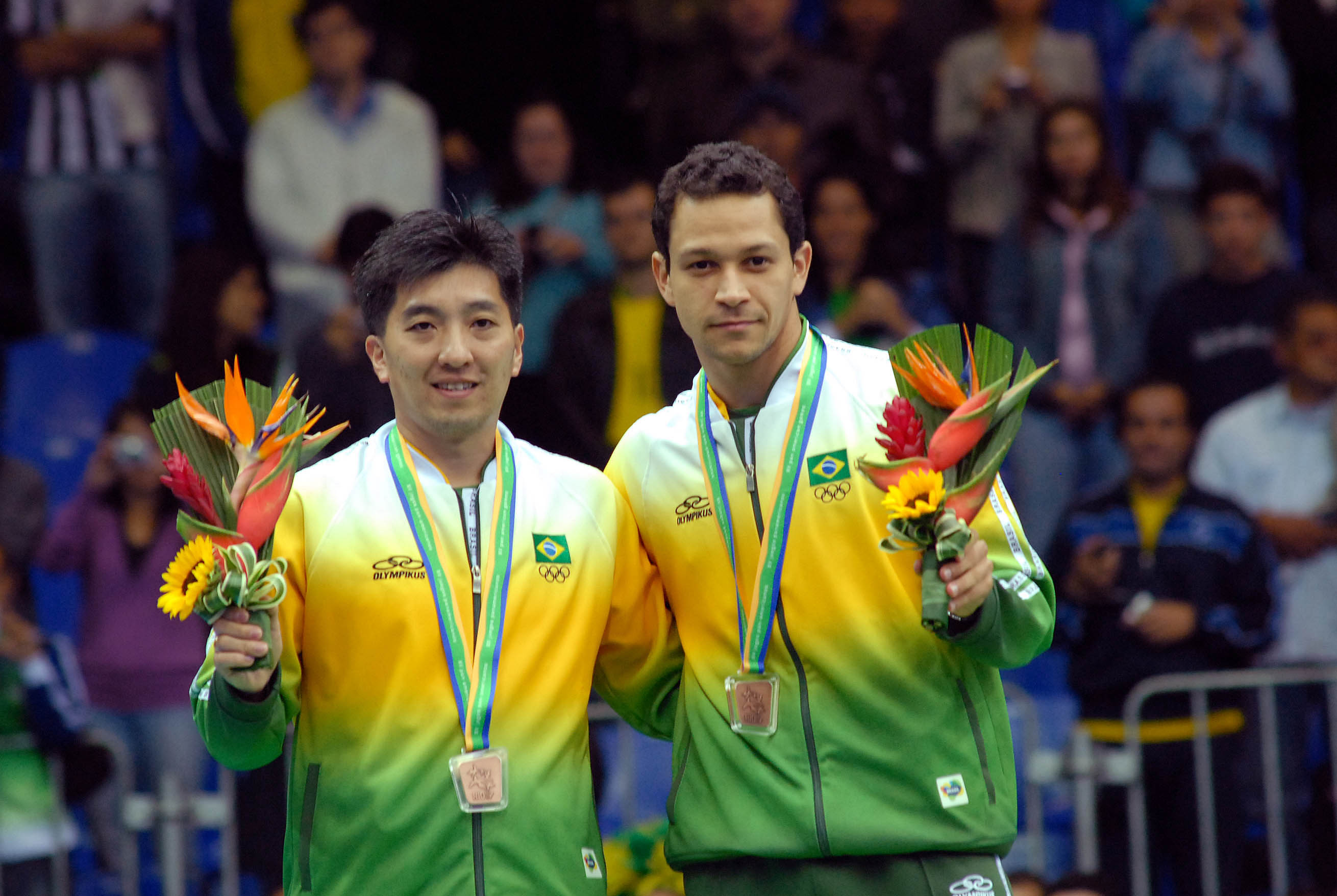
- Hugo Hoyama (left) and Thiago Monteiro (right) at the 2007 Pan American Games

Personal information
- Full name: Thiago Farias Monte Monteiro
- Nationality: Brazil
- Born: June 15, 1981 (age 45) Fortaleza, Ceará

Sport
- Sport: Table tennis
- Highest ranking: 59 (1 September 2008)
Medal record
Men's table tennis
Representing Brazil
Pan-American Games
Gold medal – first place	2003 Santo Domingo	Doubles
Gold medal – first place	2007 Rio de Janeiro	Team
Gold medal – first place	2011 Guadalajara	Team
Gold medal – first place	2015 Toronto	Team
Silver medal – second place	2003 Santo Domingo	Singles
Bronze medal – third place	1999 Winnipeg	Team
Bronze medal – third place	2007 Rio de Janeiro	Singles
Bronze medal – third place	2015 Toronto	Singles
Pan American Championships
Gold medal – first place	2017 Cartagena de Indias	Team
Gold medal – first place	2018 Santiago	Team
Gold medal – first place	2019 Asunción	Team
Silver medal – second place	2017 Cartagena de Indias	Singles
Bronze medal – third place	2018 Santiago	Singles
Latin American Championships
Gold medal – first place	2000 Coquimbo	Doubles
Gold medal – first place	2002 Santo Domingo	Doubles
Gold medal – first place	2003 El Salvador	Doubles
Gold medal – first place	2004 Valdivia	Singles
Gold medal – first place	2006 Medellín	Doubles
Gold medal – first place	2006 Medellín	Mixed Doubles
Gold medal – first place	2007 Guarulhos	Doubles
Gold medal – first place	2008 Santo Domingo	Singles
Latin American Table Tennis Cup
Gold medal – first place	2012 San Jose	Singles
Gold medal – first place	2013 Santo Domingo	Singles
South American Games
Gold medal – first place	2006 B.Aires	Doubles
Gold medal – first place	2006 B.Aires	Team
Gold medal – first place	2014 Santiago	Doubles
Gold medal – first place	2018 Cochabamba	Team
Silver medal – second place	2006 B.Aires	Mixed Doubles
Silver medal – second place	2014 Santiago	Team

Thiago Farias Monte Monteiro (Brazilian Portuguese: [tʃiˈaɡu mõˈtejɾu]; born June 15, 1981, in Fortaleza, Ceará), is a Brazilian table tennis player. He has won several medals in single, double, and team events in the Pan American Games and currently plays for Angers Vaillante in France. He is referred to as the next Hugo Hoyama and is currently ranked #1 player in Brazil and #21 in France.

== Career ==
Thiago was influenced by his father, a table tennis coach. Until the age of 12 Monteiro divided his attention between table tennis and futsal, where he also won two state championships. After winning his first Brazilian table tennis title in 1993, he decided to dedicate himself exclusively to table tennis. This title allowed him to compete for the South American Championships in 1995 where he won gold in the singles bringing him to the attention of the Brazilian National Team, which he joined in 1998.

Thiago participated in the 2004 Summer Olympics in Athens, Greece but was eliminated by Li Ching (Hong Kong) losing 4 - 1 in the second round. He also competed in the 2008 Summer Olympics playing for the Brazilian team and singles. He played in the team event at the 2012 Summer Olympics.

Monteiro achieved a great result at the 2015 World Table Tennis Championships, where, playing alongside Cazuo Matsumoto, he reached the quarterfinals of the doubles tournament, only being eliminated by the Korean duo, who finished with bronze. With this, they repeated the feat of Dagoberto Midosi and Ivan Severo, who, in 1954, also reached this stage in the World Championship held in Wembley, England. In singles, Monteiro's best results at the World Championships were the 2nd rounds of 2009 and 2021. In mixed doubles, the best result was the 2nd round in 2013.

At the 2004 Table Tennis World Cup, held in Hangzhou, China, he beat Olympic champion Seung Min Ryu, from South Korea, by 4 sets to 3 (5-11, 10-12, 11-8, 11-6, 8-11, 11-8, 11-8).

Throughout his career, Monteiro won eight medals at the Pan American Games: four gold, one silver and three bronze. He participated in 5 editions of the competition, between 1999 and 2015. In singles, he obtained a silver in 2003 and two bronzes in 2007 and 2015: he also obtained gold in doubles in 2003 and four medals for the Brazilian team, 3 golds and 1 silver.

At the Pan American Table Tennis Championships, Monteiro won silver and singles in 2017 and bronze in singles in 2018, in addition to three gold medals for the Brazilian team in 2017, 2018 and 2019.

He participated in the South American Games in 2002, 2006, 2014 and 2018. In 2002 he won four gold medals. In 2006 she won 2 gold medals in doubles and for the Brazilian team and silver in mixed doubles. In 2014, gold in doubles and silver for the Brazilian team. In 2018, gold for the Brazilian team.
