= Francisco López (table tennis) =

Venezuelan table tennis player

Personal information
- Nationality: Venezuelan
- Born: 19 September 1962 (age 64)

Sport
- Sport: Table tennis

Francisco López (born 19 September 1962) is a Venezuelan table tennis player. He competed in the men's singles event at the 1988 Summer Olympics.
