= Jim Butler (table tennis) =

American table tennis player

Personal information
- Born: February 15, 1971 (age 55) Iowa City, Iowa, United States

Sport
- Sport: Table tennis

Jim Butler (born February 15, 1971) is an American table tennis player. He competed at the 1992 Summer Olympics and the 1996 Summer Olympics. Elected into the US Table Tennis Hall of Fame in 2011.
