= Marcos Núñez =

Chilean table tennis player and coach

Personal information
- Nationality: Chile
- Born: 7 January 1961 (age 65)
- Height: 4 ft 11 in (1.50 m)
- Weight: 159 lb (72 kg)

Sport
- Sport: Table tennis
Medal record
Men's table tennis
Representing Chile
Pan American Games
| Bronze medal – third place | 1983 Caracas | Doubles |
| Bronze medal – third place | 1987 Indianapolis | Doubles |

Marcos Núñez (born 7 January 1961) is a Chilean table tennis coach and former international competitor.

Núñez represented Chile in table tennis at both the 1988 Summer Olympics in Seoul and 1992 Summer Olympics in Barcelona. He was also a doubles winner at the Latin American Championships twice and won two Pan American Games bronze medals, also in doubles.
