= Francisco Arado =

Cuban table tennis player

Personal information
- Nationality: Cuban
- Born: 30 December 1971 (age 53)

Sport
- Sport: Table tennis

Francisco Arado de Armas (born 30 December 1971) is a Brazilian-Cuban table tennis player. He competed in the men's singles event at the 2000 Summer Olympics.
