= Juan Papic =

Chilean table tennis player (born 1970)

Personal information
- Nationality: Chilean
- Born: 22 December 1970 (age 54)

Sport
- Sport: Table tennis

Juan Papic (born 22 December 1970) is a Chilean table tennis player. He competed in the men's singles event at the 2004 Summer Olympics.
