= Jorge Gambra =

Chilean table tennis player

Personal information
- Full name: Jorge Gambra Said
- Nationality: Chile
- Born: 14 July 1963 (age 63)
- Height: 5 ft 11 in (1.80 m)
- Weight: 176 lb (80 kg)

Sport
- Sport: Table tennis
Medal record
Men's table tennis
Representing Chile
Pan American Games
Bronze medal – third place	1983 Caracas	Doubles
Bronze medal – third place	1987 Indianapolis	Doubles
Bronze medal – third place	1999 Winnipeg	Singles

Jorge Gambra Said (born 14 July 1963) is a Chilean former international table tennis player. He competed in tournaments for his native country but has lived in Spain since 1989.

A two-time Olympian for Chile, Gambra first appeared at the 1988 Summer Olympics in Seoul and returned as a 37-year old at the 2000 Summer Olympics in Sydney. He finished seventh out of eight competitors in the singles group stages at both Olympics.

Gambra won the men's doubles event at the Latin American Table Tennis Championships in both 1989 and 1990, with Marcos Núñez. He was a singles bronze medalist at the 1999 Pan American Games and also has two Pan American Games doubles bronze medals.
