= Yolanda Rodríguez =

Cuban table tennis player

Personal information
- Nationality: Cuban
- Born: 26 January 1965 (age 60)

Sport
- Sport: Table tennis

Yolanda Rodríguez (born 26 January 1965) is a Cuban table tennis player. She competed in the women's singles event at the 1992 Summer Olympics.
