= Silvia Morel =

Chilean table tennis player

Personal information
- Nationality: Chilean
- Born: 18 March 1977 (age 48)

Sport
- Sport: Table tennis

Silvia Morel (born 18 March 1977) is a Chilean table tennis player. She competed in the women's doubles event at the 2000 Summer Olympics.
