= Lyanne Kosaka =

Brazilian table tennis player (born 1974)

Personal information
- Born: 6 February 1974 (age 51); São José dos Quatro Marcos, Brazil

Sport
- Sport: Table tennis

Lyanne Kosaka (born 6 February 1974) is a Brazilian table tennis player. She competed at the 1992 Summer Olympics and the 1996 Summer Olympics.
