= Elizabeth Popper =

Venezuelan table tennis player (born 1962)

Personal information
- Nationality: Venezuelan
- Born: 30 August 1962 (age 63)

Sport
- Sport: Table tennis

Elizabeth Popper (born 30 August 1962) is a Venezuelan table tennis player.

== Career ==
She competed in the women's singles event at the 1988 Summer Olympics.
