= Lígia Silva =

Brazilian table tennis player

Personal information
- Nationality: Brazil
- Born: March 6, 1981 (age 45) Manaus, Amazonas

Sport
- Sport: Table tennis
Medal record
Women's table tennis
Representing Brazil
Pan American Games
Silver medal – second place	2015 Toronto	Team
Bronze medal – third place	1999 Winnipeg	Team
Latin American Championships
Gold medal – first place	2016 San Juan	Team

Lígia Silva (born March 6, 1981, in Manaus, Amazonas) is a table tennis player from Brazil. She has competed in three Olympic Games.
