= Tawny Banh =

American table tennis player

Personal information
- Nationality: American
- Born: April 9, 1974 (age 52) Bạc Liêu, Vietnam

Sport
- Sport: Table tennis

Tawny Banh (born April 9, 1974) is an American table tennis player. She competed at the 2000 Summer Olympics and the 2004 Summer Olympics.
