= Berta Rodríguez =

Chilean table tennis player

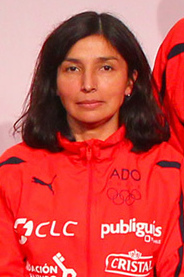

Personal information
- Born: 24 June 1971 (age 55)

Sport
- Sport: Table tennis
Medal record
Women's table tennis
Representing Chile
Pan American Games
Bronze medal – third place	1995 Mar del Plata	Doubles
Bronze medal – third place	1999 Winnipeg	Team
Bronze medal – third place	2003 Sto Domingo	Singles

Berta Rodríguez (born 24 June 1971) is a Chilean table tennis player. She competed for Chile at the 2012 Summer Olympics.
