= Marisel Ramírez =

Cuban table tennis player

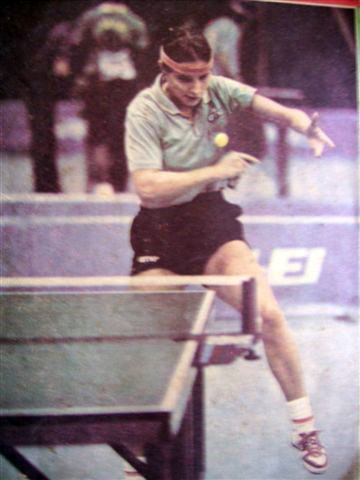
- Marisel Ramírez

Personal information
- Born: 12 April 1970 (age 55); Ciego de Ávila, Cuba

Sport
- Sport: Table tennis

Marisel Ramírez (born 12 April 1970) is a Cuban table tennis player. She competed at the 1992 Summer Olympics and the 2000 Summer Olympics.
