= Diana Gee =

American table tennis player

Personal information
- Born: December 21, 1968 (age 57) Burlingame, California, United States

Sport
- Sport: Table tennis

Diana Gee (born December 21, 1968) is an American table tennis player. She competed at the 1988 Summer Olympics and the 1992 Summer Olympics.
