= List of U.S. National Table Tennis champions =

Held since 1976, the annual U.S. National Table Tennis Championships (often referred to as the U.S. Closed) is a closed tournament that only U.S. citizens may enter. It is held by USA Table Tennis (USATT). The U.S. Nationals also serves as a qualifying tournament for USA Table Tennis National Team and determines the USA Table Tennis Juniors National Teams.

== List of champions ==
Year	Men's Singles	Women's Singles	Men's Doubles	Women's Doubles	Mixed Doubles
1936*	Sol Schiff	...	...	...	...
1951*	Oliver Hoyt Stubbs	...	...	...	...
1976*	Ray Guillen	...	...	...	...
1976	Dan Seemiller	He-Ja Lee	Dan Seemiller/Rick Seemiller	Insook Bhushan/He-ja Lee	Dan Seemiller/Insook Bhushan
1977	Dan Seemiller	Insook Bhushan	Dan Seemiller/Rick Seemiller	Insook Bhushan/Kasia Dawidowicz	Dan Seemiller/Insook Bhushan
1978	Eric Boggan	Insook Bhushan	Dan Seemiller/Rick Seemiller	He-ja Lee/Angelita Rosal	Dan Seemiller/Insook Bhushan
1979	Attila Malek	He-Ja Lee	Dan Seemiller/Rick Seemiller	He-ja Lee/Angelita Rosal	Eric Boggan/Kasia Dawidowicz
1980	Dan Seemiller	He-Ja Lee	Dan Seemiller/Rick Seemiller	He-ja Lee/Angelita Rosal	Ricky Seemiller/Cheryl Dadian
1981	Scott Boggan	Insook Bhushan	Dan Seemiller/Rick Seemiller	Insook Bhushan/Kasia Dawidowicz	Dan Seemiller/Insook Bhushan
1982	Dan Seemiller	Insook Bhushan	Dan Seemiller/Rick Seemiller	Jin Na/Angelita Rosal	Dan Seemiller/Insook Bhushan
1983	Dan Seemiller	Insook Bhushan	Dan Seemiller/Rick Seemiller	Insook Bhushan/Diana Gee	Dan Seemiller/Insook Bhushan
1984	Eric Boggan	Julie Ou	Scott Boggan/Perry Schwartzberg	Diana Gee/Lisa Gee	Quang Do/Lisa Gee
1985	Sean O’Neill	Insook Bhushan	Quang Bui/Brian Masters	Insook Bhushan/Diana Gee	Sean O'Neill/Diana Gee
1986	Chartchai Teekaveerakit	Insook Bhushan	Sean O'Neill/Hank Teekaveerakit	Insook Bhushan/Diana Gee	Sean O'Neill/Diana Gee
1987	Sean O’Neill	Insook Bhushan	Quang Bui/Brian Masters	Insook Bhushan/Diana Gee	Sean O'Neill/Diana Gee
1988	Sean O’Neill	Insook Bhushan	Eric Boggan/Sean O’Neill	Insook Bhushan/Diana Gee	Dan Seemiller/Insook Bhushan
1989	Sean O’Neill	Insook Bhushan	Jim Butler/Scott Butler	Insook Bhushan/Diana Gee	Brian Masters/Insook Bhushan
1990	Jim Butler	Wei Wang	Sean O’Neill/Dan Seemiller	Insook Bhushan/Diana Gee	Sean O’Neill/Diana Gee
1991	Sean O’Neill	Insook Bhushan	John Onifade/Dan Seemiller	Insook Bhushan/Diana Gee	Sean O’Neill/Diana Gee
1992	Jim Butler	Amy Feng	David Zhuang/Sean O’Neill	Wei Wang/Lily Yip	David Zhuang/Amy Feng
1993	Jim Butler	Amy Feng	David Zhuang/Sean O’Neill	Amy Feng/Lily Yip	David Zhuang/Amy Feng
1994	David Zhuang	Amy Feng	David Zhuang/Dan Seemiller	Amy Feng/Lily Yip	David Zhuang/Amy Feng
1995	David Zhuang	Amy Feng	Khoa Nguyen/Darko Rop	Wei Wang/Lily Yip	David Zhuang/Amy Feng
1996	Cheng Yinghua	Gao Jun	Cheng Yinghua/Todd Sweeris	Gao Jun/Amy Feng	Cheng Yinghua/Gao Jun
1997	Cheng Yinghua	Gao Jun	Cheng Yinghua/Jack Huang	Gao Jun/Amy Feng	Cheng Yinghua/Gao Jun
1998	David Zhuang	Gao Jun	Eric Owens/Barney J. Reed	Gao Jun/Virginia Sung	David Zhuang/Gao Jun
1999	Cheng Yinghua	Gao Jun	David Zhuang/Todd Sweeris	Gao Jun/Michelle Do	David Zhuang/Gao Jun
2000	David Zhuang	Gao Jun Chang	David Zhuang/Todd Sweeris	Gao Jun Chang/Michelle Do	Cheng Yinghua/Gao Jun Chang
2001	Eric Owens	Gao Jun Chang	David Zhuang/Eric Owens	Gao Jun Chang/Jasna Reed	Cheng Yinghua/Gao Jun Chang
2002	Ilija Lupulesku	Gao Jun Chang	Cheng Yinghua/Han Xiao	Gao Jun Chang/Jasna Reed	Sean O'Neill/Jackie Lee **
2003	Ilija Lupulesku	Jasna Reed	Ilija Lupulesku/David Zhuang	Jasna Reed/Tawny Banh	Ilija Lupulesku/Jasna Reed
2004	Cheng Yinghua	Gao Jun	Ilija Lupulesku/Mark Hazinski	Gao Jun/Tawny Banh	Cheng Yinghua/Gao Jun
2005	Ilija Lupulesku	Jasna Reed	Ilija Lupulesku/Mark Hazinski	Crystal Huang/Whitney Ping	Adam Hugh/Lily Yip
2006	David Zhuang	Wang Chen	David Zhuang/Han Xiao	Crystal Huang/Tawny Banh	Mark Hazinski/Crystal Huang
2007	Ilija Lupulesku	Wang Chen	Ilija Lupulesku/Mark Hazinski	Wang Chen/Judy Hugh	Han Xiao/Jackie Lee
2008	David Zhuang	Crystal Huang	David Zhuang/Shao Yu	Crystal Huang/Tawny Banh	Samson Dubina/Crystal Huang
2009	Michael Landers	Gao Jun	Dan Seemiller/Mark Hazinski	Gao Jun/Crystal Huang	Liu Hui Yuan/Gao Jun
2010	Timothy Wang	Ariel Hsing	Ilija Lupulesku/Yiyong Fan	Jasna Reed/Judy Hugh	Adam Hugh/Judy Hugh
2011	Peter Li	Ariel Hsing	Timothy Wang/Han Xiao	Gao Jun/Erica Wu	Timothy Wang/Ariel Hsing
2012	Timothy Wang	Lily Zhang	Timothy Wang/Han Xiao	Gao Jun/Erica Wu	Timothy Wang/Ariel Hsing
2013	Timothy Wang	Ariel Hsing	Theodore Tran/Jeff Lin Huang	Ariel Hsing/Judy Hugh	Timothy Wang/Ariel Hsing
2014	Jimmy Butler	Lily Zhang	Cory Eider/Allen Wang	Lily Zhang/Jiaqi Zheng	Timothy Wang/Lily Zhang
2015	Yijun Feng	Jiaqi Zheng	Yijun Feng/Jack Wang	Chen Wang/Ying Lu	Yijun Feng/Ying Lu
2016	Kanak Jha	Lily Zhang	Newman Cheng / Jeff Huang	Lily Zhang / Jiaqi Zheng	Yijun Feng / Jiaqi Zheng
2017	Kanak Jha	Lily Zhang	Gal Alguetti / Sharon Alguetti	Yue Wu / Xinyue Wang	Yanjun Gao / Yue Wu
2018	Kanak Jha	Juan Liu	Kanak Jha / Krishnateja Avvari	Juan Liu / Xinyue Wang	Kanak Jha / Amy Wang
2019	Kanak Jha	Lily Zhang	Kanak Jha / Yijun Feng	Crystal Wang / Amy Wang	Nikhil Kumar / Amy Wang
2021	Xin Zhou	Amy W. Wang	N/A	N/A	N/A
2022	Nikhil Kumar	Lily Zhang	Daniel Tran / Michael Tran	Amy Wang / Rachel Sung	Rachel Sung / Dan Liu
2023	Nikhil Kumar	Amy Wang	Jinxin Wang / Krishnateja Avvari	Amy Wang / Rachel Sung	Nikhil Kumar / Amy Wang
2024	Kanak Jha	Hong Lin	Nandan Naresh / Daniel Tran	Amy Wang / Rachel Sung	Andrew Cao / Amy Wang
2025	Kanak Jha	Sally Moyland	Sid Naresh / Nikhil Kumar	Amy Wang / Abigail Yu	Sally Moyland / Nikhil Kumar
2026	Kanak Jha	Sally Moyland	Nandan Naresh / Daniel Tran	Sally Moyland / Irene Yeoh	Jishan Liang / Sally Moyland
