= List of naturalised Olympic table tennis players from China =

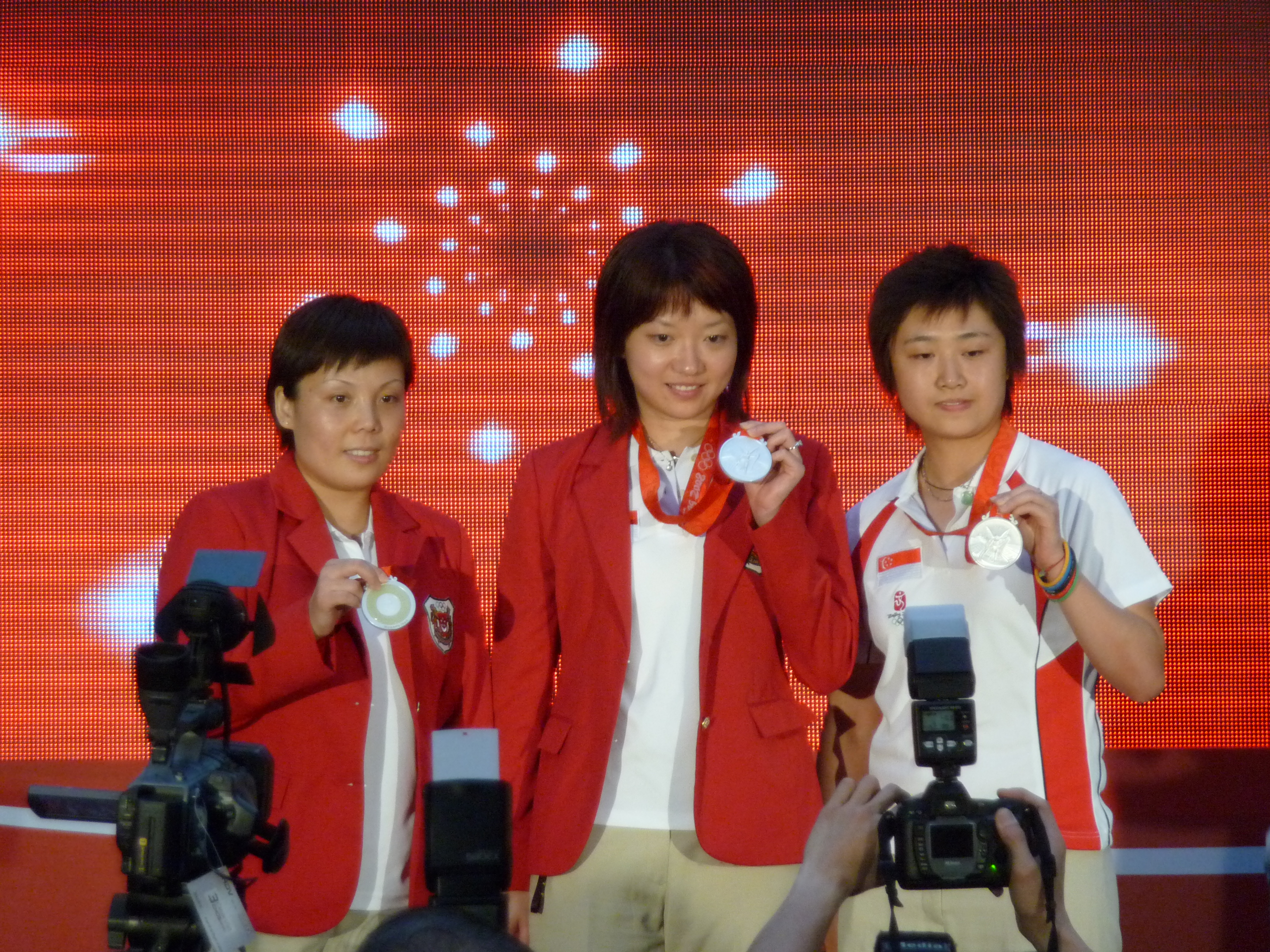
Wang Yuegu, Li Jiawei, and Feng Tianwei, who won Singapore's only medal at the 2008 Summer Olympics, were all recruited from China through the Foreign Sports Talent Scheme.

Since table tennis was introduced to the Summer Olympics in 1988, only 38 table tennis players have represented China at the event. By contrast, at least 124 Chinese-born players have competed for other countries and territories. Table tennis is the only Olympic sport with over 30% of players representing an adopted country (more than double the rate for all other sports), and the vast majority hail from China. This list includes Hong Kong players from mainland China but not foreign-born players of Chinese descent (e.g. the entire 2012 U.S. team: Timothy Wang, Ariel Hsing, Erica Wu and Lily Zhang), with the exception of Hui So Hung who was born in Indonesia but was already a Chinese citizen when she emigrated to British Hong Kong in 1978.

== Male players ==
Country	Player	Olympic appearances
Argentina	Liu Song	2000, 2004, 2008, 2012
Australia	Justin Han	2012
Australia	Chris Yan	2016
Austria	Ding Yi	1988, 1992, 1996, 2000
Austria	Qian Qianli	1996
Austria	Chen Weixing	2004, 2008, 2012
Canada	Wenguan Johnny Huang	1996, 2000, 2004
Canada	Shen Qiang	2008
Canada	Wilson Zhang	2008
Canada	Eugene Wang	2012, 2016, 2020
Croatia	Tan Ruiwu	2008
Dominican Republic	Lin Ju	2004, 2008, 2012
Hong Kong	Lo Chuen Tsung	1988, 1992, 1996
Hong Kong	Chan Kong Wah	1996
Hong Kong	Cheung Yuk	2000, 2004, 2008
Hong Kong	Leung Chu Yan	2000, 2004, 2012
Hong Kong	Ko Lai Chak	2004, 2008
Hong Kong	Li Ching	2004, 2008
Hong Kong	Tang Peng	2012, 2016
Hong Kong	Jiang Tianyi	2012
Italy	Yang Min	2004
Japan	Seiko Iseki	2000 represented China in 1988
Japan	Shu Arai	2004
Japan	Yo Kan	2008
Poland	Wang Zengyi	2012, 2016
Qatar	Li Ping	2016
Republic of the Congo	Wang Jianan	2016
Singapore	Gao Ning	2008, 2012, 2016
Singapore	Yang Zi	2008, 2012
Singapore	Cai Xiaoli	2008
Singapore	Zhan Jian	2012
Singapore	Chen Feng	2016
Slovakia	Wang Yang	2016, 2020
Spain	He Zhiwen	2004, 2008, 2012, 2016
Turkey	Cem Zeng	2008
Turkey	Bora Vang	2012
Turkey	Ahmet Li	2016
Ukraine	Kou Lei	2008, 2016, 2020
United Kingdom	Chen Xinhua	1996
United States	David Zhuang	1996, 2000, 2008
United States	Cheng Yinghua	2000
United States	Feng Yijun	2016

== Female players ==
Country	Player	Olympic appearances
Australia	Ying Kwok	1992
Australia	Shirley Zhou	1996, 2000
Australia	Stella Zhou	1996, 2000
Australia	Jian Fang Lay	2000, 2004, 2008, 2012, 2016, 2020
Australia	Miao Miao	2000, 2004, 2008, 2012
Australia	Stephanie Sang	2008
Australia	Vivian Tan	2012
Australia	Ziyu Zhang	2016
Austria	Liu Jia	2000, 2004, 2008, 2012, 2016
Austria	Li Qiangbing	2008, 2012, 2016, 2020
Brazil	Gui Lin	2012
Canada	Barbara Chiu	1992, 1996
Canada	Geng Lijuan	1996, 2000
Canada	Chris Xu	2000
Canada	Xiao-Xiao Wang	2000
Canada	Zhang Mo	2008, 2012, 2016, 2020
Canada	Judy Long	2008
Chile	Zhiying Zeng	2024
Croatia	Tian Yuan	2012
Dominican Republic	Wu Xue	2004, 2008
Dominican Republic	Lian Qian	2008
France	Xiaoming Wang-Dréchou	1992, 1996
France	Xian Yi Fang	2008, 2012
France	Li Xue	2012, 2016
France	Jia Nan Yuan	2020
Germany	Jie Schöpp	1996, 2000, 2004
Germany	Qianhong Gotsch	2000
Germany	Jing Tian-Zörner	2000
Germany	Wu Jiaduo	2008, 2012
Germany	Zhenqi Barthel	2008
Germany	Han Ying	2016, 2020
Germany	Shan Xiaona	2016, 2020
Hong Kong	Hui So Hung	1988
Hong Kong	Mok Ka Sha	1988
Hong Kong	Chan Tan Lui	1992, 1996
Hong Kong	Chai Po Wa	1992, 1996
Hong Kong	Song Ah Sim	2000
Hong Kong	Tie Ya Na	2004, 2008, 2012, 2016
Hong Kong	Lau Sui Fei	2004, 2008
Hong Kong	Lin Ling	2004, 2008
Hong Kong	Jiang Huajun	2012
Italy	Wenling Tan Monfardini	2004, 2008, 2012
Japan	Chire Koyama	1996, 2000
Japan	Taeko Todo	1996
South Korea	Dang Ye-seo	2008, 2012
South Korea	Seok Ha-jung	2012
South Korea	Jeon Ji-hee	2016
Luxembourg	Ni Xialian	2000, 2008, 2012, 2016, 2020
Monaco	Xiaoxin Yang	2020, 2024
Netherlands	Li Jie	2008, 2012, 2016
Netherlands	Li Jiao	2008, 2012, 2016
New Zealand	Chunli Li	1992, 1996, 2000, 2004
New Zealand	Karen Li	2000, 2004
Poland	Li Qian	2008, 2012, 2016
Poland	Xu Jie	2008
Portugal	Lei Huang Mendes	2012
Portugal	Fu Yu	2016, 2020
Portugal	Shao Jieni	2016, 2020
Republic of the Congo	Yang Fen	2008
Republic of the Congo	Han Xing	2012, 2016
Singapore	Jing Junhong	1996, 2000, 2004
Singapore	Li Jiawei	2000, 2004, 2008, 2012
Singapore	Zhang Xueling	2004
Singapore	Feng Tianwei	2008, 2012, 2016, 2020
Singapore	Wang Yuegu	2008, 2012
Singapore	Yu Mengyu	2016, 2020
Singapore	Zhou Yihan	2016
Spain	Shen Yanfei	2008, 2012, 2016
Spain	Zhu Fang	2008
Sweden	Li Fen	2016
Switzerland	Dai-Yong Tu	1996
Chinese Taipei	Chen Jing	1996, 2000 represented China in 1988
Chinese Taipei	Xu Jing	1996, 2000
Chinese Taipei	Chen-Tong Fei-Ming	2000
Turkey	Melek Hu	2008, 2012, 2016
United Kingdom	Na Liu	2012
United States	Lily Yip	1992, 1996
United States	Amy Feng	1996
United States	Wei Wang	1996
United States	Gao Jun	2000, 2004, 2008 represented China in 1992
United States	Crystal Huang	2008
United States	Wang Chen	2008
United States	Wu Yue	2016
United States	Zheng Jiaqi	2016

== See also ==
- List of table tennis players
