= North American Table Tennis Championships =

North American table tennis tournament

The North American Table Tennis Championships is a table tennis tournament for North America. It was first held in 1985 in Lake Placid. After this edition the North American Championships were suspended till 1991. From 1991 to 2015, the tournament was held every year. After the introduction of the Pan American Table Tennis Championships in 2017, the North American Championships were not held for a decade before returning in 2026, when the event was staged by ITTF-Americas in the San Francisco Bay Area.

== Results ==
Year	City	Single		Double	
Year	City	Men's	Women's	Men's	Women's
2026	Burlingame	(Canada) Edward Ly	(United States) Sally Moyland	(Canada) Laurent Jutras-Vigneault (Canada) Edward Ly	(United States) Amy Wang (United States) Jessica Reyes-Lai
2015	Westchester	(United States) Timothy Wang	(United States) Lily Zhang		
2014	Mississauga	(Canada) Eugene Wang	(Canada) Zhang Mo		
2013	Vancouver	(Canada) Eugene Wang	(United States) Ariel Hsing		
2012	Cary	(Canada) Pierre-Luc Thériault	(United States) Lily Zhang		
2011	Mississauga	(Canada) Pierre-Luc Hinse	(Canada) Zhang Mo		
2010	Grand Rapids	(Canada) Pradeeban Peter-Paul	(Canada) Zhang Mo		
2009	Laval	(Canada) Xavier Therien	(Canada) Zhang Mo		
2008	Las Vegas	(Canada) Pradeeban Peter-Paul	(United States) Gao Jun		
2007	Laval	(Canada) Pradeeban Peter-Paul	(United States) Wang Chen		
2006	Rochester	(Canada) Bence Csaba	(United States) Wang Chen	(Canada) Bence Csaba (Canada) Qiang Shen	(Canada) Shirley Yan (Canada) Zhang Mo
2005	Pointe-Claire	(Canada) Bence Csaba	(United States) Gao Jun	(Canada) Xavier Therien (Canada) Pierre-Luc Hinse	(United States) Gao Jun (United States) Jasna Fazlić
2004	Chicago	(Canada) Wenguan Johnny Huang	(United States) Gao Jun		
2003	San Diego	(Canada) Wenguan Johnny Huang	(Canada) Xu-Ngo Hong Guang Chris	(Canada) Bence Csaba (Canada) Faazil Kassam	(Canada) Petra Cada (Canada) Marie-Christine Roussy
2002	Edmonton	(Canada) Wenguan Johnny Huang	(United States) Gao Jun	(Canada) Bence Csaba (Canada) Faazil Kassam	(Canada) Geng Lijuan (Canada) Marie-Christine Roussy
2001	Fort Lauderdale	(Canada) Wenguan Johnny Huang	(United States) Gao Jun	(United States) Eric Owens (United States) David Zhuang	(United States) Gao Jun (United States) Jasna Fazlić
2000	Toronto	(United States) Khoa Nguyen	(Canada) Geng Lijuan	(United States) Cheng Yinghua (United States) Khoa Nguyen	(United States) Gao Jun (United States) Michelle Do
1999	Fort Lauderdale	(Canada) Wenguan Johnny Huang	(United States) Gao Jun	(Canada) Liu Kuan Ting Kurt (Canada) Pradeeban Peter-Paul	(United States) Gao Jun (United States) Amy Feng
1998	Winnipeg	(Canada) Wenguan Johnny Huang	(Canada) Geng Lijuan	(United States) Eric Owens (United States) Barney Reed James	(Canada) Petra Cada (Canada) Geng Lijuan
1997	Flint	(Canada) Wenguan Johnny Huang			
1996	Edmonton	(Canada) Wenguan Johnny Huang	(Canada) Geng Lijuan		
1995	South Bend	(Canada) Wenguan Johnny Huang	(Canada) Geng Lijuan		
1994	Laval	(United States) Cheng Yinghua	(Canada) Geng Lijuan		
1993	Augusta	(Canada) Wenguan Johnny Huang	(United States) Amy Feng		
1992	St Hyacinthe	(Canada) Wenguan Johnny Huang	(Canada) Geng Lijuan	(Canada) Wenguan Johnny Huang (Canada) Horatio Pintea	(Canada) Chiu-Chen Xiaowen Barbara (Canada) Geng Lijuan
1991	Laval	(Canada) Gideon Joe Ng	(Canada) Geng Lijuan		
1990	St Hyacinthe	(United States) Sean O'Neill			
1985	Lake Placid	(Canada) Gideon Joe Ng	(Canada) Mariann Domonkos		

== See also ==
- Table tennis
- World Table Tennis Championships
- Pan American Table Tennis Championships
- List of table tennis players
