= Killerspin =

American table tennis equipment company

Killerspin, LLC
- Company type: Private
- Industry: Sports equipment
- Founded: 2001; 25 years ago
- Founder: Robert Blackwell
- Headquarters: Chicago, Illinois, US
- Products: Table tennis tables, rackets, balls
- Website: killerspin.com

Killerspin, LLC is an American company that focuses on the table tennis market. Killerspin manufactures tables, rackets, and balls. It is a part of sponsoring and hosting several competitions, as well as table tennis related special events. Killerspin equipment and products are distributed in fourteen countries on five separate continents.

== Events ==
The company has hosted the largest table tennis events ever held in the United States, including the:

- Extreme Table Tennis Championship
- Spinvitational Table Tennis Championship
- Arnold Classic Table Tennis Challenge
- Mohegan Sun Table Tennis Championship.

These competitions are often aired nationally on ESPN.

== Killerspin Krew ==
Killerspin has a team of endorsed players representing different countries. Members of the ‘Killerspin Krew’ have included players selected for the U.S. Men's Table Tennis Team. Current team members include:

- Biba Golić
- Aleksandar Karakašević
- Chen Qi
- Saša Drinić
- Ilija Lupulesku
- Mark Hazinski
- Andrei Filimon
- Eric Owens
- Georgina Pota
- Adam Hugh
- Elie
- Barney Reed

== Affiliates ==
On October 13, 2008, The National Collegiate Table Tennis Association announced its exclusive Table Tennis Equipment Partnership with Killerspin for the duration of three years. Killerspin will provide balls and barriers to 17 NCTTA Divisions throughout the country. With this agreement Killerspin became the official equipment supplier for College Table Tennis.

== Marketing ==
Killerspin has been involved with televised table tennis competitions that have been broadcast on Fox Sports Net and ESPN worldwide. Killerspin also produces both instructional and event-based table tennis DVDs for consumers.

Killerspin products have been featured in television programs including MTV's Real World, The Simple Life, and HGTV’s Don't Sweat It. Additionally, Killerspin gear and sponsored players were highlighted in the Hollywood feature film, Balls of Fury, and the independent film Ping Pong Playa.
