= Table Tennis Canada =

Sports governing body in Canada

- Abbreviation: TTCAN
- Formation: 1929
- Type: NPO
- Purpose: Sport governing body
- Headquarters: Ottawa, Ontario, Canada
- Region served: Canada
- Main organ: Board of Directors
- Website: TTCAN.ca

Table Tennis Canada (French: Tennis de Table Canada), colloquially known as TTCAN, is the non-profit governing body for table tennis in Canada and is responsible for cataloging and sanctioning tournaments within Canada. It was founded in 1929 as the Canadian Table Tennis Association. In addition to processing tournaments, TTCAN maintains a national rating and ranking system. It also oversees the Canadian National Teams. In total, TTCAN has over 9,000 members. The headquarters of Canada Table Tennis is located in Ottawa, Ontario, Canada, which is also home to the Canadian Olympic Training Center.

== History ==
The Canadian Table Tennis Association was formed in 1929, with Québec as the founding provincial member and Ontario joining 5 years later. A long association with the Canadian National Exhibition began in 1936, when the first Canadian Table Tennis Championships were staged there. The CTTA operates a computerized rating system that allows any competitive player to be ranked, both provincially and nationally Canada's table-tennis stars of the 1930s were Paul Chapdelaine and J.J. Desjardins of Montréal.

In the 1970s, Violette Nesukaitis, of Toronto, emerged as a strong international player. Winner of 4 North American open championships, she travelled to China in 1971 on a Canadian team, the first table-tennis team to be invited to that country. In 1973 she was ranked 3rd among Commonwealth women players. She retired in 1976.

In the 1990s. 2 world class players, Geng Lijuan and Wenguan Johnny Huang, dominated Canadian table tennis. Both achieved top-10 world rankings and represented Canada at the Olympic Games in 1996 and 2000. Their best results were recorded in 1996 at Atlanta; Huang defeated the number one seed and defending Olympic champion to finish fifth overall in the men's singles; Lijuan attained a ninth-place finish. She also won 4 World Championships titles.

== Members ==
- Alberta Table Tennis Association
- British Columbia Table Tennis Association
- Manitoba Table Tennis Association
- Newfoundland & Labrador Table Tennis Association
- Nova Scotia Table Tennis Association
- Nunavut Table Tennis Association
- Ontario Table Tennis Association
- Prince Edward Island Table Tennis Association
- Québec Table Tennis Association
- Saskatchewan Table Tennis Association
- Yukon Table Tennis Association
- Table Tennis North

== Canada Table Tennis National Teams ==
The rosters for the Canada Table Tennis National Teams are as follows:

- Eugene Wang
- Pierre-Luc Thériault
- Marko Medjugorac
- Filip Ilijevski
- Jeremy Hazin
- Antoine Bernadet
- Pierre-Luc Hinse
- Zhang Mo
- Rachel Yi Lu
- Ioulia Degtia
- Sara Yuen

== See also ==
- International Table Tennis Federation
- USA Table Tennis Champions
- North American Table Tennis Championships
