= 2015 in table tennis =

- January 8 – December 13: 2015 ITTF Calendar of Events

== World cups, championships, and test event ==
- January 8–11: World Team Cup in (United Arab Emirates) Dubai
  - Men: China (Fan Zhendong, Zhang Jike, Xu Xin)
  - Women: China (Liu Shiwen, Zhu Yuling, Ding Ning)
- April 26 – May 3: 2015 World Table Tennis Championships in (China) Suzhou
  - Men's singles: (China) Ma Long
  - Men's doubles: (China) Xu Xin / Zhang Jike
  - Women's singles: (China) Ding Ning
  - Women's doubles: (China) Liu Shiwen / Zhu Yuling
  - Mixed doubles: (China) Xu Xin / (South Korea) Yang Ha-eun
- October 16–18: Men's World Cup in (Sweden) Halmstad
  - Winner: (China) Ma Long
- October 23–31: 2015 World Cadet Challenge in (Egypt) Sharm el-Sheikh
  - Boys' singles: (China) YANG Shuo
  - Boys' doubles: (Japan) Koyo Kanamitsu / (China) YANG Shuo
  - Girls' singles: (Brazil) Bruna Takahashi
  - Girls' doubles: (South Korea) CHOI Hae-eun / (Japan) Maki Shiomi
  - Mixed doubles: (Sweden) Truls Moregard / (Puerto Rico) Adriana Diaz
  - Boys' team winners: Team Europe (Cristian Pletea, Medardas Stankevicius, Truls Moregard)
  - Girls' team winners: Team Latin America (Adriana Diaz, Bruna Takahashi, Esmerlyn Castro)
- October 30 – November 1: Women's World Cup in (Japan) Sendai
  - Winner: (China) Liu Shiwen
- November 18–21: Aquece Rio International Table Tennis Tournament 2015 in Brazil (Olympic Test Event)
  - Men's singles: (United Kingdom) Paul Drinkhall
  - Women's singles: (Brazil) Lin Gui
- November 29 – December 6: 2015 World Junior Table Tennis Championships in (France) Vendée
  - China won all the gold medals and won the overall medal tally, too.

== Continental TT championships ==
- January 23–29: 2015 African Table Tennis Championships in Cairo
  - Men's singles: (Egypt) Omar Assar
  - Women's singles: (Egypt) Dina Meshref
  - Men's doubles: (Nigeria) Makanjuola Kazeem / Quadri Aruna
  - Women's doubles: (Republic of the Congo) Han Xing / Onyinyechi Nwachukwu
  - Mixed doubles: (Egypt) Omar Assar / Dina Meshref
  - Men's team: Egypt (El-sayed Lashin, Omar Assar, Ahmed Saleh)
  - Women's team: Egypt (Nadeen El-Dawlatly, Dina Meshref, Yousra Helmy)
- February 6–8: 2015 European Top 16 Cup in (Azerbaijan) Baku
  - Men's winner: (Germany) Dimitrij Ovtcharov
  - Women's winner: (Austria) Liu Jia
- March 13–15: 2015 Asian Cup Table Tennis Tournament in (India) Jaipur
  - Men's winner: (China) Xu Xin
  - Women's winner: (Singapore) Feng Tianwei
- March 16–24: 2015 Latin American Table Tennis Championships in (Argentina) Buenos Aires
  - Men's singles: (Brazil) Hugo Calderano
  - Women's singles: (Brazil) Gui Lin
  - Men's doubles: (Chile) Manuel Moya / Alejandro Rodríguez
  - Women's doubles: (Brazil) Gui Lin / Lígia Silva
  - Mixed doubles: (Mexico) Marcos Madrid / Yadira Silva
  - Men's team winners: Brazil (Hugo Calderano, Cazuo Matsumoto, Thiago Monteiro)
  - Women's team winners: Brazil (Lígia Silva, Jessica Yamada, Gui Lin)
- April 8–12: 2015 African Junior and Cadet Championships in (Mauritius) Beau-Bassin Rose-Hill
  - Junior
  - Men's junior singles winner: (Egypt) Aly Ghallab
  - Women's junior singles winner: (Egypt) Amira Yousry
  - Men's junior doubles winners: (Egypt) Aly Ghallab / Karim Elhakem
  - Women's junior doubles winners: (Egypt) Reem Morad / Amira Yousry
  - Mixed junior doubles winners: (Egypt) Aly Ghallab / Reem Morad
  - Men's junior team winners: Egypt (Aly Ghallab, Karim Elhakem, Omar Elhamady)
  - Women's junior team winners: Algeria (Lynda Loghraibi, Sannah Lagsir, Hiba Feredj)
  - Cadet
  - Men's cadet singles winner: (Egypt) Youssef Abdel-Aziz
  - Women's cadet singles winner: (Egypt) Marwa Alhodaby
  - Men's cadet team winners: Egypt (Youssef Abdel-Aziz and Marwan Abdelwahab)
  - Women's cadet team winners: Egypt (Marwa and Mariam Alhodaby)
- April 10–12: 2015 ITTF-Oceania Cup in (Australia) Bendigo
  - Oceania Cup
  - Men's singles winner: (Australia) William Henzell
  - Women's singles winner: (Australia) Lay Jian Fang
  - Pacific Cup
  - Men's singles winner: (New Caledonia) Laurent Sens
  - Women's singles winner: (New Caledonia) Ornella Bouteille
- May 13–16: 2015 Oceania Cadet and Junior Championships in (Kiribati) Tarawa
  - Junior
  - Men's junior singles winner: (Australia) Jake Duffy
  - Men's junior doubles winners: (Australia) Dillon Chambers / Jake Duffy
  - Women's junior singles winner: (Australia) Rebekah Stanley
  - Women's junior doubles winners: (New Zealand) CHENG Zhiying / VONG Hui-Ling
  - Mixed junior doubles winners: (Australia) Jake Duffy / Rebekah Stanley
  - Men's junior team winners: Australia (Dillon Chambers, Jake Duffy, Rohan Dhooria)
  - Women's junior team winners: Australia (Katherine Li, Rebekah Stanley, Georgina Newton)
  - Cadet
  - Men's cadet singles winner: (Australia) Benjamin Gould
  - Men's cadet doubles winners: (New Zealand) Kevin Lin / ZHAO Yang Lun
  - Women's cadet singles winner: (New Zealand) VONG Hui-Ling
  - Women's cadet doubles winners: (New Zealand) CHENG Zhiying / VONG Hui-Ling
  - Mixed cadet doubles winners: (New Zealand) ZHAO Yang Lun / VONG Hui-Ling
  - Men's cadet team winners: New Zealand (Kevin Lin, and ZHAO Yang Lun)
  - Women's cadet team winners: Australia (Rebekah Stanley, Katherine Li, Georgina Newton)
- May 15–17: 2015 North America Cup in (Canada) Markham, Ontario
  - Men's winner: (United States) Jimmy Butler
  - Women's winner: (Canada) Zhang Mo
- May 29–31: 2015 Latin American Table Tennis Cup in (Cuba) Havana
  - Men's winner: (Brazil) Gustavo Tsuboi
  - Women's winner: (Brazil) Caroline Kumahara
- June 23–28: 2015 Latin American Junior and Cadet Championships in Aguada, Puerto Rico
  - Junior
  - Junior boys' singles winner: (Puerto Rico) Brian Afanador
  - Junior boys' doubles winners: (Puerto Rico) Brian Afanador / Yomar Gonzalez
  - Junior girls' singles winner: (Brazil) Leticia Nakada
  - Junior girls' doubles winners: (Brazil) Leticia Nakada / Alexia Nakashima
  - Junior mixed doubles winners: (Brazil) Vitor Santos / Alexia Nakashima
  - Junior boys' team winners: Argentina
  - Junior girls' team winners: Brazil
  - Cadet
  - Cadet boys' singles winner: (Brazil) Guilherme Teodoro
  - Cadet boys' doubles winners: (Brazil) Rafael Torino / Guilherme Teodoro
  - Cadet Girls' Singles winner: (Brazil) Bruna Takahashi
  - Cadet girls' doubles winners: (Puerto Rico) Adriana Diaz / Lineris Rivera
  - Cadet mixed doubles winners: (Puerto Rico) Francisco Matias / Adriana Diaz
  - Cadet boys' team winners: Brazil
  - Cadet girls' team winners: Puerto Rico
- July 10–19: 2015 European Youth Championships in (Slovakia) Bratislava
  - Junior boys' singles winner: (Sweden) Anton Kallberg
  - Junior boys' doubles winner: (Slovenia) Darko Jorgic / Deni Kozul
  - Junior girls' singles winner: (Romania) Adina Diaconu
  - Junior girls' doubles winners: (Russia) Maria Malanina / Daria Chernoray
  - Junior mixed doubles winners: (Romania) Alexandru Manole / Andreea Clapa
  - Cadet boys' singles winner: (Romania) Cristian Pletea
  - Cadet boys' doubles winners: (France) Irvin Bertrand / Lilian Bardet
  - Cadet girls' singles winner: (Russia) Maria Taylakova
  - Cadet girls' doubles winners: (Croatia) Ema Marn / Andrea Pavlovic
  - Cadet mixed doubles winners: (Romania) Cristian Pletea / (Russia) Maria Taylakova
- July 21–23: 2015 Africa Cup, TOP16, in (Cameroon) Yaoundé
  - Men's winner: (Egypt) Omar Assar
  - Women's winner: (Egypt) Dina Meshref
- July 22–26: 2015 Asian Junior and cadet Championships in (Malaysia) Kuala Lumpur
  - Junior: China won all the gold medals available and won the overall medal tally, too.
  - Cadet: China won all the gold medals available and won the overall medal tally, too.
- September 5–7: 2015 North American Table Tennis Championships in Westchester County, New York
  - Men's winner: (United States) Timothy Wang
  - Women's winner: (United States) Lily Zhang
  - Cadet boys' singles winner: (United States) Jack Wang
  - Cadet girls' singles winner: (United States) Crystal Wang
  - Men's team winners: United States (Jimmy Butler, Timothy Wang, Kanak Jha)
  - Women's team winners: United States (Lily Zhang, Judy Hugh, Amy Wang)
  - Junior men's team winners: United States (Jack Wang, Kanak Jha, Krishnateja Avvari)
  - Junior women's team winners: United States (Prachi Jha, Crystal Wang, Amy Wang)
- September 25 – October 4: 2015 European Table Tennis Championships in (Russia) Yekaterinburg
  - Men's singles winner: (Germany) Dimitrij Ovtcharov
  - Women's singles winner: (Romania) Elizabeta Samara
  - Men's doubles winners: (Austria) Stefan Fegerl / (Portugal) João Monteiro
  - Women's doubles winners: (Turkey) Melek Hu / (Spain) Shen Yanfei
- September 26 – October 3: 2015 Asian Table Tennis Championships in (Thailand) Pattaya
  - Men's singles winner: (China) Fan Zhendong
  - Women's singles winner: (China) Zhu Yuling
  - Men's doubles winners: (China) Fan Zhendong / Xu Xin
  - Women's doubles winners: (North Korea) Kim Hye Song / Ri Mi-gyong
  - Mixed doubles winners: (China) Fan Zhendong / Chen Meng
  - Men's team winners: China (Xu Xin, Fan Zhendong, Zhang Jike)
  - Women's team winners: China (Zhu Yuling, Ding Ning, Chen Meng)
- October 16–18: 2015 Europe Youth Top-10 in (Romania) Buzău
  - For information, click here.

== ITTF World Tour ==
- January 28 – November 15: 2015 ITTF World Tour
  - January 28 – February 1: Hungarian Open in (Hungary) Budapest
    - Men's singles: (Hong Kong) Jiang Tianyi
    - Women's singles: (Japan) Misako Wakamiya
    - Men's doubles: (South Korea) Jeong Sang-eun / Lee Sang-su
    - Women's doubles: (Austria) Sofia Polcanova / Amelie Solja
  - February 11–15: Kuwait Open in Kuwait City
    - Men's singles: (China) Ma Long
    - Women's singles: (China) Li Xiaoxia
    - Men's doubles: (Chinese Taipei) Chiang Hung-Chieh / Huang Sheng-Shyan
    - Women's doubles: (China) Ding Ning / Zhu Yuling
  - February 17–22: Qatar Open in Doha
    - Men's singles: (Belarus) Vladimir Samsonov
    - Women's singles: (Romania) Elizabeta Samara
    - Men's doubles: (Portugal) Marcos Freitas / (Croatia) Andrej Gaćina
    - Women's doubles: (Hong Kong) Jiang Huajun / Tie Ya Na
  - March 10–14: Nigeria Open in Lagos
    - Men's singles: (Egypt) Omar Assar
    - Women's singles: (Portugal) Jieni Shao
    - Men's doubles: (Nigeria) Quadri Aruna / Kazeem Makanjuola
    - Women's doubles: (Egypt) Dina Meshref / (Portugal) Jieni Shao
  - March 18–22: German Open in (Germany) Bremen
    - Men's singles: (China) Ma Long
    - Women's singles: (Japan) Mima Ito
    - Men's doubles: (Germany) Timo Boll / Patrick Franziska
    - Women's doubles: (Germany) Shan Xiaona / Petrissa Solja
  - March 25–29: Spanish Open in (Spain) Almería
    - Men's singles: (Japan) Maharu Yoshimura
    - Women's singles: (South Korea) JEON Ji-hee
    - Men's doubles: (Spain) He Zhi Wen / Carlos Machado
    - Women's doubles: (Japan) Ai Fukuhara / Misako Wakamiya
  - May 13–17: Belarus Open in Minsk
    - Men's singles: (Qatar) Li Ping
    - Women's singles: (Japan) Mima Ito
    - Men's doubles: (Denmark) Jonathan Groth / Kasper Sternberg
    - Women's doubles: (Japan) Miyu Maeda / Mori Sakura
  - May 19–23: Croatia Open in Zagreb
    - Men's singles: (Japan) Maharu Yoshimura
    - Women's singles: (South Korea) CHOI Hyo-joo
    - Men's doubles: (Japan) Masataka Morizono / Yuya Oshima
    - Women's doubles: (South Korea) JEON Ji-hee / Yang Ha-eun
  - May 27–31: Philippines Open in Subic, Zambales
    - Men's singles: (Japan) Yuya Oshima
    - Women's singles: (Japan) Kasumi Ishikawa
    - Men's doubles: (Belgium) Robin Devos / Cedric Nuytinck
    - Women's doubles: (Hong Kong) LEE Ho Ching / ZHU Chengzhu
  - June 3–7: Australian Open in (Australia) Gold Coast
    - Men's singles: (South Korea) Jung Young-sik
    - Women's singles: (Japan) Ai Fukuhara
    - Men's doubles: (Hong Kong) HO Kwan Kit / LAM Siu Hang
    - Women's doubles: (South Korea) JEON Ji-hee / LEE Da-som
  - June 24–28: Japan Open in Kobe
    - Men's singles: (China) Xu Xin
    - Women's singles: (China) Chen Meng
    - Men's doubles: (China) Ma Long / Xu Xin
    - Women's doubles: (China) LIU Fei / Wu Yang
  - July 1–5: Korea Open in (South Korea) Incheon
    - Men's singles: (South Korea) Jung Young-sik
    - Women's singles: (Japan) Ai Fukuhara
    - Men's doubles: (South Korea) Jung Young-sik / Kim Min-seok
    - Women's doubles: (Japan) Miu Hirano / Mima Ito
  - July 29 – August 2: Pyongyang Open in North Korea
    - Men's singles: (North Korea) CHOE Il
    - Women's singles: (China) SUN Chen
    - Men's doubles: (North Korea) CHOE Il / PAK Sin Hyok
    - Women's doubles: (North Korea) KIM Song I / Ri Myong-sun
  - August 5–9: China Open in Chengdu
    - Men's singles: (China) Ma Long
    - Women's singles: (China) Zhu Yuling
    - Men's doubles: (China) Fan Zhendong / Xu Xin
    - Women's doubles: (China) Chen Meng / Liu Shiwen
  - August 19–23: Bulgaria Open in Panagyurishte
    - Men's singles: (South Korea) KIM Dong-hyun
    - Women's singles: (Japan) Kasumi Ishikawa
    - Men's doubles: (South Korea) CHO Eon-rae / KIM Dong-hyun
    - Women's doubles: (South Korea) JEON Ji-hee / YANG Ha-eun
  - August 26–30: Czech Open in (Czech Republic) Olomouc
    - Men's singles: (Hong Kong) Wong Chun Ting
    - Women's singles: (Japan) Ai Fukuhara
    - Men's doubles: (Sweden) Pär Gerell / Jon Persson
    - Women's doubles: (South Korea) JEON Ji-hee / YANG Ha-eun
  - September 2–6: Austrian Open in (Austria) Wels
    - Men's singles: (Japan) Jun Mizutani
    - Women's singles: (Germany) Han Ying
    - Men's doubles: (South Korea) JANG Woo-jin / Lee Sang-su
    - Women's doubles: (Germany) SHAN Xiaona / Petrissa Solja
  - September 9–12: Belgium Open in De Haan
    - Men's singles: (Iran) Nima Alamian
    - Women's singles: (South Korea) SEO Hyo-won
    - Men's doubles: (Iran) Nima Alamian / Noshad Alamian
    - Women's doubles: (Singapore) Lin Ye / Zhou Yihan
  - September 16–20: Argentina Open in Mendoza, Argentina
    - Men's singles: (Brazil) Eric Jouti
    - Women's singles: (South Korea) JEON Ji-hee
    - Men's doubles: (Argentina) Gaston Alto / Pablo Tabachnik
    - Women's doubles: (South Korea) JEON Ji-hee / YANG Ha-eun
  - September 23–27: Chile Open in Santiago
    - Men's singles: (Brazil) Thiago Monteiro
    - Women's singles: (South Korea) JEON Ji-hee
    - Men's doubles: (Chile) Gustavo Gómez / Manuel Moya
    - Women's doubles: (Brazil) Leticia Nakada / Bruna Takahashi
  - October 21–25: Poland Open in Warsaw
    - Men's singles: (China) Fan Zhendong
    - Women's singles: (China) Liu Shiwen
    - Men's doubles: (Sweden) Kristian Karlsson / Mattias Karlsson
    - Women's doubles: (China) Ding Ning / Zhu Yuling
  - November 4–8: Russia Open in Yekaterinburg
    - Event cancelled
  - November 11–15: Swedish Open in (Sweden) Stockholm
    - Men's singles: (China) Fan Zhendong
    - Women's singles: (China) Mu Zi
    - Men's doubles: (China) Fang Bo / Xu Xin
    - Women's doubles: (China) Chen Meng / Mu Zi
- December 10–13: 2015 ITTF World Tour Grand Finals in (Portugal) Lisbon
  - Men's singles: (China) Ma Long
  - Women's singles: (China) Ding Ning
  - Men's doubles: (Japan) Masataka Morizono / Yuya Oshima
  - Women's doubles: (China) Ding Ning / Zhu Yuling

== Para table tennis ==
- March 12 – December 19: 2015 ITTF Para Table Tennis Calendar of Events
- Note: The French Open, slated for June 17–21 in Nantes, was cancelled.
  - March 12–16: Hungarian Open in (Hungary) Eger
    - South Korea won both the gold and overall medal tallies.
  - March 17–22: Italian Open in (Italy) Lignano Sabbiadoro
    - Ukraine won the gold medal tally. France won the overall medal tally.
  - April 6–13: 2015 Oceania Para Regional Championships in Bendigo
    - Australia won both the gold and overall medal tallies.
  - May 5–10: Slovenian Open in (Slovenia) Laško
    - Ukraine won the gold medal tally. Ukraine, South Korea, and Russia had a score of 13.5 each in the overall medal tally.
  - May 12–17: Slovak Open in (Slovakia) Bratislava
    - South Korea won both the gold and overall medal tallies.
  - May 26–31: Bayreuth Open in Germany
    - China won both the gold and overall medal tallies.
  - June 17–21: Para Table Tennis Open Ciutat del Prat in (Spain) El Prat de Llobregat
    - France won both the gold and overall medal tallies.
  - June 24–28: Romania International Table Tennis Open in Cluj-Napoca
    - Slovakia won the gold medal tally. Romania won the overall medal tally.
  - July 24–27: Thailand Open 2015 in Pattaya
    - Thailand won both the gold and overall medal tallies.
  - August 7–14: Part of the 2015 Parapan American Games in (Canada) Toronto
    - Brazil won both the gold and overall medal tallies.
  - August 22–24: Taichung Table Tennis Open for the Disabled 2015 in Chinese Taipei
    - Thailand won the gold medal tally. Chinese Taipei won the overall medal tally.
  - September 3–6: 2015 Korea PTT Open in Ulsan
    - South Korea won both the gold and overall medal tallies.
  - September 22–27: Czech Open 2015 in (Czech Republic) Ostrava
    - Poland won both the gold and overall medal tallies.
  - October 5–7: 1st Morocco Para TT Open 2015 in Agadir
    - Nigeria won the gold medal tally. Morocco won the overall medal tally.
  - October 7–11: African Championships 2015 in (Morocco) Agadir
    - Egypt won both the gold and overall medal tallies.
  - October 12–18: 2015 European Regional Championships in (Denmark) Vejle
    - Poland won the gold medal tally. France won the overall medal tally.
  - October 17–22: Al Watani Championship in (Jordan) Amman
    - China won both the gold and overall medal tallies.
  - October 22–29: 2015 Asia Regional Championships in (Jordan) Amman
    - China won both the gold and overall medal tallies.
  - October 30 – November 3: Belgium Open in Sint-Niklaas
    - Belgium won the gold medal tally. Japan won the overall medal tally.
  - November 5–9: Copa Tango XIII in Buenos Aires
    - Chile and Russia won 3 gold medals each. Argentina won the overall medal tally.
  - November 13–15: Copa Chile in Santiago
    - Brazil won both the gold and overall medal tallies.
  - November 19–25: China Open in Beijing
    - China won both the gold and overall medal tallies.
  - December 16–19: Copa Costa Rica in San José, Costa Rica
    - France and Russia won 4 gold medals each. France won the overall medal tally.
