= Eric Owens =

Eric Owens may refer to:

- Eric Owens (bass-baritone) (born 1970), American operatic bass-baritone
- Eric Owens (baseball) (born 1971), American baseball outfielder
- Eric Owens (table tennis) (born c 1975), American table tennis player
