= Glossary of table tennis =

This glossary defines terms related to the sport of table tennis.

Alternation of ends
After each game, players switch sides of the table. In the last possible game of a match, for example, the seventh game in a best-of-seven matches, players change ends when the first player scores five points, regardless of whose turn it is to serve. Service is subject to change at the game point of the match. Upon the final point of the match, the player with the lower score serves. If the sequence of serving and receiving is out of turn or the ends are not changed, points scored in the wrong situation are still calculated, and the game shall be resumed with the order at the score that has been reached.
Alternation of service
Service alternates between opponents every two points (regardless of the winner of the rally) until the end of the game, unless both players score ten points or the expedite system is operated, when the sequences of serving and receiving stay the same but each player serves for only one point in turn (Deuce). The player serving first in a game receives first in the next game of the match.
Antispin
A smooth rubber with very low surface friction, used to defend against strong spin or to confuse the opponent. This type of rubber is rarely seen in modern top-level table tennis, but is popular with amateur and veteran players.
Assistant umpire
Someone who assists the main umpire with decisions.
Attacker
A player who uses a large number of attacking shots.
Backspin
Is where the bottom half of the ball is rotating away from the player, and is imparted by striking the base of the ball with a downward movement. At the professional level, backspin is usually used defensively to keep the ball low. Backspin is commonly employed in service because it is harder to produce an offensive return.
Bat
see Table tennis racket.
Blade
The wooden portion of the racket, often referred to as the "blade", commonly features anywhere between one and seven plies of wood, though cork, glass fiber, carbon fiber, aluminum fiber, and Kevlar are sometimes used. According to ITTF regulations, at least 85% of the blade's thickness shall be made of natural wood. Common wood types include balsa, limba, and cypress or "hinoki", which is popular in Japan. The average size of the blade is approximately 17 centimetres (6.7 in) long and 15 centimetres (5.9 in) wide. Although the official restrictions focus solely on the flatness and rigidity of the blade itself, these dimensions are optimal for most playing styles.
Block
The block is a simple shot, but can be devastating against an attacking opponent. A block is executed by simply placing the racket in front of the ball right after the ball bounces; thus, the ball rebounds back toward the opponent with nearly as much energy as it came in with. This requires precision, since the ball's spin, speed, and location all influence the correct angle of a block. An opponent can execute a perfect loop, drive, or smash, only to have the blocked shot come back at them just as fast. Due to the power involved in offensive strokes, an opponent often cannot recover quickly enough and will be unable to return the blocked shot. Blocks almost always produce the same spin as was received, often topspin. Depending on the spin of the ball, the block may be returned to an unexpected side of the table. This may come to your advantage, as the opponent may not expect this.
Blocker
A player who blocks the ball a majority of the time.
Casters
Large wheels on the bottom of the legs of some table tennis tables.
Chop
A chop is the defensive, backspin counterpart to the offensive loop drive. A chop is essentially a bigger, heavier push, taken well back from the table. The racket face points primarily horizontally, perhaps a little bit upward, and the direction of the stroke is straight down. The object of a defensive chop is to match the topspin of the opponent's shot with backspin. A good chop will float nearly horizontally back to the table, in some cases having so much backspin that the ball actually rises. Such a chop can be extremely difficult to return due to its enormous amount of backspin. Some defensive players can also impart no-spin or sidespin variations of the chop.
Chop block
A shot that uses sidespin and backspin. The player must hit diagonally downwards to generate the shot.
Chopper
A player who chops the ball the majority of the time.
Closed angle
A small racket angle where a large amount of spin is generated.
Closed racket
The hitting surface of the racket is aimed downward, and the top edge is leaning away from the player.
Counter-hit
The counter-hit is usually a counterattack against an incoming attack, normally high loop drives. The racket is held closed and near to the ball, which is hit with a short movement "off the bounce" (immediately after hitting the table) so that the ball travels faster to the other side. A well-timed, accurate counter-drive can be as effective as a smash.
Counter-loop
A counter with a large amount of topspin from both players.
Counter-smash
When both players smash the ball after each other.
Crosscourt
When a player hits the ball diagonally across the table.
Crossover
The point where a player has to change from playing a forehand stroke to backhand stroke; often a target for attack, since it is difficult to return balls aimed at this area.
Dead ball
A ball sent by a player which has little to no spin. Usually bounces on the table more than once.
Deep
A shot hit long, toward the back of the table. Some also use the term to describe a player who is playing deep, far away from the table.
Deuce
At 10-10, a player must win the set by two points, such as 12-10, 13-11, 14-12, etc.
Double bounce
When the ball bounces twice on the same side of the table.
Doubles
Two players on each side of the table.
Down the line
When a player hits the ball straight down the line on one side of the table.
Drop shot
Placing the ball so short that the opponent has difficulty reaching and returning it. Best done when the opponent is far away from the table.
Early
The rising part of a ball's bounce.
Expedite rule
A rule where a rally cannot go on for a certain amount of time or number of shots.
Extreme angle
A very small racket angle.
Falkenberg drill
A regular movement drill, where the attacker has to attack from the three positions backhand, backhand, forehand in an infinite loop into a fixed position of the feeding player. The second backhand ball of the attacker is played with the forehand, forcing them to move quickly into the forehand afterwards. This move is aimed at improving technique, consistency, and accuracy.
Flat
A shot with little spin and moves in a straighter trajectory.
Flick
The more common word for the Flip nowadays. A short shot from over the table, close to the net, played in a looping style or a flat hit. It can include a sidespin component when played from the backhand, particularly when played as a banana flick. The term banana refers to the movement of the racket when swinging the backhand, mainly with the wrist and forearm.
Flip
When a player tries to attack a ball that has not bounced beyond the edge of the table, the player does not have the room to wind up in a backswing. The ball may still be attacked, however, and the resulting shot is called a flip because the backswing is compressed into a quick wrist action. A flip is not a single stroke and can resemble either a loop drive or a loop in its characteristics. What identifies the stroke is that the backswing is compressed into a short wrist flick.
Footwork
How a player moves their feet during a shot.
Forehand
For a right-handed player, any shot done with the racket to the right of their elbow. For a left-handed player, any shot done with the racket to the left of their elbow.
Free hand
The player's hand that is not holding the racket.
Game point
Game situation when one player needs just one more point to win.
Grip
Competitive table tennis players grip their rackets in a variety of ways. The manner in which competitive players grip their rackets can be classified into two major families of styles; one is described as penhold and the other shakehand. The Laws of Table Tennis do not prescribe the manner in which one must grip the racket, and numerous variations on gripping styles exist.
Hard rubber
A rubber with a hard feeling and sponge. May also refer to the topsheet. The lower catapult strength makes it easier for players at a higher level to focus on playing the ball with more spin, as more frictional force can be applied without giving the ball too much forward momentum.
Heavy spin
Used to describe strong spin.
High toss serve
When a player tosses the ball very high to serve. The high toss gives the ball more momentum to convert into spin when serving, but makes it more difficult to control.
Hit
A direct hit on the ball, propelling it forward back to the opponent. This stroke differs from speed drives in other racket sports like tennis because the racket is primarily perpendicular to the direction of the stroke and most of the energy applied to the ball results in speed rather than spin, creating a shot that does not arc much, but is fast enough that it can be difficult to return. A speed drive is primarily used to keep the ball in play, apply pressure to the opponent, and potentially create an opportunity for a more powerful attack.
International Table Tennis Federation
(ITTF), is the governing body for all national table tennis associations. The role of the ITTF includes overseeing rules and regulations and seeking technological improvement for the sport of table tennis. The ITTF is responsible for the organization of numerous international competitions, including the World Table Tennis Championships that has continued since 1926.
Inverted rubber
Rubber which contacts the ball with its smooth surface, and is glued to the sponge with its pimpled surface. With a larger contact area, this type of rubber generally produces more spin than pimpled rubber, although some rubbers are designed to have the opposite effect (see Antispin above).
ITTF
see International Table Tennis Federation.
Kill shot
A shot that wins the point.
Late
The falling part of a ball's bounce.
Let
A let is a rally of which the result is not scored and is called in the following circumstances:
- The ball touches the net in service (service), provided the service is otherwise correct or the ball is obstructed by the player on the receiving side. Obstruction means a player touches the ball when it is above or traveling towards the playing surface, provided it has not touched the player's court since being last struck by the player.
- When the player on the receiving side is not ready, and the service is delivered.
- Player's failure to make a service or a return or to comply with the Laws is due to a disturbance outside the control of the player.
- Play is interrupted by the umpire or assistant umpire.
A let is also called a foul service if the ball hits the server's side of the table, if the ball does not pass further than the edge, or if the ball hits the table edge and then hits the net.
Let serve
When the serve touches the net but still goes over. The serve is retaken.
Loaded
A shot with a very large amount of spin.
Lob
The defensive lob propels the ball about five metres or more in height, only to land on the opponent's side of the table with potentially great amounts of spin. To execute, a defensive player first backs-off the table 4–6 meters; then, the stroke itself consists of lifting the ball to an enormous height before it falls back to the opponent's side of the table, ideally on the white backline. A lob is inherently a creative shot, and can have nearly any kind of spin. Top-quality players utilize this to their advantage, controlling the spin of the ball. For instance, although the opponent may smash the ball hard and fast, a good defensive lob can be more difficult to return due to its unpredictability and high amount of spin. Thus, though backed off the table by tens of feet and running to reach the ball, a good player can still win the point using well-placed lobs. However, at the professional level, lobbers will lose the point most of the time, so the lob is not used unless it is really necessary. Usually, a topspin component is added to the lobbed ball to force the attacking player to move back from the table as the ball travels deeper when bouncing back to its original height. This reduces the feasible angle of attack, making it more difficult for the attacking player to apply more force. Additionally, the distance of the ball towards the table increases, giving the defending player more time to react to subsequent smashes or even providing them with the opportunity to counterloop the smash from behind.
Long
A shot that hits the back of the table.
Long pips
A rubber with long pimples. The pimples are facing outwards from the blade. This makes the respective side of the racket less sensitive to spin, but also limits the ability to generate spin at the same time. Long pips are usually preferred by players with a defensive playstyle, as the lower sensitivity to the opponent's spin makes it easier to chop the ball back.
Loop
A strong topspin stroke that aims to overpower the spin of the oncoming ball.
Looper
Player with attacks using topspins/loops
Loose
A return which is too high, too long, has insufficient spin, or a combination of the above. Easy for the opponent to attack or kill (compare tight, below).
Magnus effect
Is an observable phenomenon that is commonly associated with a spinning object. The path of the spinning object is deflected in a manner that is not present when the object is not spinning. The difference in pressure on opposite sides of the spinning object can explain the deflection. Topspin in ball games is defined as spin about a horizontal axis perpendicular to the direction of travel, which causes the top surface of the ball to move in the direction of travel. Under the Magnus effect, topspin produces a downward swerve of a moving ball, greater than would be produced by gravity alone. Backspin produces an upwards force that prolongs the flight of a moving ball. Likewise, side-spin causes swerve to either side. The overall behaviour is similar to that around an aerofoil (see lift force), but with a circulation generated by mechanical rotation rather than airfoil action.
Match
Usually played as Best-Of-Five or Best-Of-Seven in competitive table tennis.
Medium long serve
A serve where the second bounce is ideally on the white line on the back of the table. This type of serve is more difficult to directly attack, especially in combination with backspin, as the returning player cannot wait until the ball bounces off the table. At the same time, it is also challenging to attack the ball early, as the table edge limits the racket swing.
Mid long serve
see Medium long serve.
Multiball
Training method minimizing wasted time by using many balls which are continuously fed to the player, either by another player or a ball robot. It is easier to play the same ball consistently as a feeder, which allows beginner players to focus more on correct technique and timing during practice, rather than adapting to the variations in spin, placement, and length of the ball. When played at a faster pace, the practicing player can focus on speed, stamina, and movement.
No-spin
A ball played with almost no rotational component
No-spin serve
A serve played with No-spin
Net-Out
Obstruction
Open angle
Open racket
The hitting surface of the racket is aimed upwards, and the top edge leans toward the player.
Paddle
see Table tennis racket.
Penhold
Style of player who grips the paddle like holding a pen. In recent years, notable users of the penhold grip include Olympic Champions 2004 Ryu Seung-Min and 2008 Ma Lin, and World Champion 2009 Wang Hao. The grip they use varies, as Ryu Seuing-Min plays a penhold grip where only one side of the racket is used, whereas the Chinese players use penhold grips that allow both sides of the racket to be used, enabling them to play the reverse penhold backhand. Other notable penhold players in the current time include European Champion 2022 Dang Qiu from Germany and European Games Winner 2023 Félix Lebrun from France.
Pimples
Rubber which contacts the ball with its pimpled surface; produces different effects on the spin compared with inverted rubber, due to the reduced contact area and flexibility of the pimples. They are usually called pips and refer to Pips-out as opposed to the Pips-in. They are roughly divided into long and short pips, where shorter pips still allow for attacking moves, while longer pips favor a defending playstyle. Rubbers with pips can be played without a sponge.
Pips
See Pimples.
Pips-in
In contrast to pips-out, pips-in are considered to be the more normal type of rubbers in use and suit the attacking playstyle well due to their possibility to generate strong spins. An exception to this is anti-topspins, which are more similar to long pips than regular pips-in rubbers, as the smooth surface makes them agnostic to spin.
Pips-out
See Pimples
Play-Back position
Positioning a table tennis table with one side bent at a 90-degree angle to practice.
Playing elbow
Aiming to play the ball around the elbow, making it difficult for the opponent player to anticipate whether the forehand or backhand should be used to return the ball.
Playing surface
Push
The push is usually used for keeping the point alive and creating offensive opportunities. A push resembles a tennis slice: the racket cuts underneath the ball, imparting backspin and causing the ball to float slowly to the other side of the table. While not obvious, a push can be difficult to attack because the backspin on the ball causes it to drop toward the table upon striking the opponent's racket. To attack a push, a player must usually loop the ball back over the net. Often, the best option for beginners is to push the ball back again, resulting in pushing rallies. Against good players, it may be the worst option because the opponent will counter with a loop, putting the first player in a defensive position. Another response to pushing is flipping the ball when it is close to the net. Pushing can have advantages in some circumstances, such as when the opponent makes easy mistakes.
Racket hand
The hand holding the racket. Balls played with the racket hand instead of the racket are rule-compliant and may happen by accident. The racket hand is allowed to switch at any time by transferring the racket to the other hand.
Rally
Often used to describe situations in which both players attack with topspins in a topspin-topspin duel.
Rating
Rating even
Receive
The stroke to return the serve. Winning the coin toss also allows you to choose whether to start with the receiving team.
Referee
Reverse penhold backhand
Stroke of a two-sided penhold player using his backhand rubber. It is called reverse because the classical penhold players until 2000 used only one side of the racket. Nowadays, most penhold players employ two-sided penhold grips and often exhibit strong topspin with the reverse penhold backhand.
Rubber
Refers to the rubber that is attached to the blade.
Rubber cleaner
Cleaning substance to clean the rubber from dust and dirt.
Sandwich rubber
Rubber, with sponge.
Seemiller grip
The Seemiller grip is named after the American table tennis champion Danny Seemiller, who used it. It is achieved by placing your thumb and index finger on either side of the bottom of the racquet head and holding the handle with the rest of your fingers. Since only one side of the racquet is used to hit the ball, two contrasting rubber types can be applied to the blade, offering the advantage of "twiddling" the racket to fool the opponent. Seemiller paired inverted rubber with anti-spin rubber; many players today combine inverted and long-pipped rubber. The grip is considered exceptional for blocking, especially on the backhand side, and for forehand loops of backspin balls.
Service
The point starts with the service, where the serving player has to play the ball to their own half of the table one before the ball bounces to the opponent's table side. The service is often abbreviated as serve. The service is a comparatively strongly regulated stroke with requirements on the tossing height, the angle, and the visibility of the ball when serving.
Serve
Same as service, but more often used in verbal language.
Set
Also called game, a set is won by the first player who reaches 11 points. The set starts with the serving player having to play the first two services; afterwards, the service right (which is not optional) changes after every two points. By standard ITTF rules, a player must win a set with at least a two-point lead. Therefore, in the event the score reaches 10:10, the rules slightly change. Now, the service right changes at every point and the players who first has two points more than his opponent wins, e.g. scores to win could be 12:10, 13:11, 21:19 or 33:31 but not 11:10. In competitive table tennis, usually Best-Of-Five or Best-Of-Seven is played, which means that the first player to win three (Bo5) or four (Bo7) sets, wins the match.
Shakehand
The most popular table-tennis grip; With the index finger extended over the paddle head perpendicular to the handle.
Short
The ball is played such that the (hypothetically) second bounce and more would still be on the table. This makes it more difficult to attack the ball as the table limits the swing angle.
Sidespin
This type of spin is predominantly employed during service, wherein the contact angle of the racket can be more easily varied. Sidespin causes the ball to spin on an axis that is vertical, rather than horizontal. The axis of rotation is still roughly perpendicular to the trajectory of the ball. In this circumstance, the Magnus effect will still dictate the curvature of the ball to some degree. Another difference is that, unlike backspin and topspin, sidespin has relatively little effect on the bounce of the ball, much in the same way that a spinning top would not travel left or right if its axis of rotation were exactly vertical. This makes sidespin a useful weapon in service because it is less easily recognized when bouncing, and the ball "loses" less spin on the bounce. Sidespin can also be employed in offensive rally strokes, often from a greater distance, as an adjunct to topspin or backspin. This stroke is sometimes referred to as a "hook". The hook can even be used in some extreme cases to circumvent the net when away from the table.
Singles
One player on each side of the table.
Skunk
An informal rule in table tennis that says that a player wins a game at a score of 7-0 or 11-1.
Smash
The offensive trump card is the smash. A player typically executes a smash when the opponent returns a ball that bounces too high or too close to the net. Smashing consists of using a large backswing and rapid acceleration to impart as much speed on the ball as possible. The goal of a smash is to get the ball to move so quickly that the opponent cannot return it. Because the ball speed is the main aim of this shot, often the spin on the ball is something other than topspin. Sidespin can be used effectively with a smash to alter the ball's trajectory significantly, although most intermediate players will smash the ball with little or no spin. An offensive table tennis player will think of a rally as a build-up to a winning smash.
Smother kill
Speed glue
Glue used to attach rubber to the blade; contains a high percentage of volatile solvents, which soak into the sponge of a rubber and increase the speed and spin of a stroke. The use is currently forbidden due to the health risks associated with volatile solvents, and umpires check rackets for volatile components at professional tournaments.
Spin
Referring to the rotation of the ball
Spin reversal
An effect which happens when one player uses an anti-topspin rubber or long pips. As the surface of these rubbers is not sensitive to spin due to the lack of friction, the ball can be returned such that the spin of the ball is reversed, meaning that a topspin can be easily played back as a backspin ball and vice versa. Sidespin balls may be played with the direction of the rotation swapped. The ball slips through the rubber surface.
Sponge
A rubber consists of a sponge layer and a rubber layer, where the sponge layer is called "sponge".
Step around
Leg movement which allows to play with the forehand on the backhand side of the table. Usually, one foot has to step around the table such that the body faces the direction of the incoming ball, hence the naming. In the case of a right-handed player, the left foot steps around so that it is on the left side of the table (from this player's point of view).
Strike
Stroke
Hit the ball with a defined swing/movement
Sweet spot
Refers to the part of the racket where the impact of the ball on contact is considered regular. Hitting the ball near the edge of the racket leads to the opposite, as the edge effects of the vibration noise feed back to the player.
Table tennis racket
Also known as a paddle or bat, is used by table tennis players. The table tennis racket is typically made from laminated wood, covered with rubber on one or two sides, depending on the player's grip. The USA generally uses the term "paddle" while Europeans and Asians use the term "bat" and the official ITTF term is "racket".
Third ball
The stroke hit by the server after the opponent's return of the serve. Because the serve can be used to make attacking difficult for the opponent, the third ball is frequently the first strong attacking stroke in a table-tennis rally.
Throw angle
The angle with which the ball is tossed. By rule, it is required to be tossed vertically, but also allows a 30-degree tolerance between the vertical plane and the direction of fall. If the ball toss is high enough, this tolerance allows the ball to travel some lateral distances.
Tight
A return which is difficult for the opponent to attack. Always a low ball, usually in combination with being short, having strong backspin, or both
Topspin
Referring to both the spin of the ball and the stroke which produces it. Depending on the region, topspin is more often used than looping
Twiddle
Twirl
Two step footwork
Two-winged looper
Player can attack with topspin from both forehand and backhand sides.
Umpire
The role which oversees the match to be compliant with the rules, awarding the point to the respective player during the sets, and decides the penalty in case of rule violation in accordance with the ITTF rules.
Underspin
see Backspin
USA Table Tennis
Colloquially known as USATT, is the non-profit governing body for table tennis in the United States and is responsible for cataloging and sanctioning table tennis tournaments within the country.
Volley
Hitting the ball before it bounces on the own table side, which is considered a fault. It may happen accidentally.
Wide angle
A sudden, drastic change of the ball placement during a point, which makes it difficult for the opponent to reach.

== See also ==
- Table tennis
- International Table Tennis Federation
- USA Table Tennis
- Table tennis styles
- Table tennis racket

== Bibliography ==
- Uzorinac, Zdenko (2001). ITTF 1926 - 2001 Table Tennis Legends. ITTF. ISBN 2-94031-200-1. OCLC 248920627.
- Charyn, Jerome (2002). Sizzling Chops & Devilish Spins: Ping-Pong and the Art of Staying Alive. Four Walls Eight Windows. ISBN 1-56858-242-0.
- Hodges, Larry (1993). Table Tennis: Steps to Success. Human Kinetics. ISBN 0-87322-403-5.
- International Table Tennis Federation (2011). ITTF Handbook 2011/2012. Archived from the original on 6 July 2010.
- Seemiller, Dan (1996). Winning Table Tennis: Skills, Drills, and Strategies. Human Kinetics. ISBN 0-88011-520-3.
