= Game point =

Game point or Game points may refer to:

== Racket sports ==
- Game point, a situation where the next rally can determine the winner of a game
  - Pickleball
  - Table tennis
  - Tennis

== Other ==
- Game points, a term used in Card games
