= Table tennis in the United States =

- Country: United States
- Governing body: USA Table Tennis
- National team: United States

Table tennis in the United States is regulated by USA Table Tennis. USATT Historian Tim Boggan has written a volume of books entitled “History of U.S. Table Tennis” to give the readers a brief overview of how the sport of table tennis came to be. There are a total of 19 books in the series. Table tennis was initially considered an alternative to lawn tennis at parties and events. However, the rapid rise in popularity of table tennis reached worldwide and caught attention in the United States. In 1993, the official governing body of the United States Table Tennis Association was created. The sport was not named ping pong since that name was already taken from by the Parker Brothers. The non-profit corporation version of the United States Table Tennis Association truncated their name to “USA Table Tennis”.

== Rules and regulations ==
The rules and regulation of US Table Tennis vary depending on whether or not the game is for a tournament or just an exhibition match. The rules on a tournament game are strict in terms or how much the player can do. For example, when serving the player must throw the ball at least six inches straight up in the air and there must be no additional spin on the ball. The ball must be stationary on the palm behind the end line. If the ball dips under the table before the serve or starts in front of the end line, then the service is fowled. Additionally, the ball must be visible at all times. Again, if the ball is not visible, then the server forfeits the point. The fouls are different. If a ball is too short for the player to reach and they place their non-paddle hand over the table then play stops and the opponent receives the point.

== Tournaments ==
During tournaments teams play in either singles or doubles teams. During a singles game the rules are different from a doubles match. For example, in a doubles match the server must serve the ball across the net and into the opposite box. However in a singles match the server can serve the ball any way they like. The prize of a tournament can vary as well. For example a local tournament would not have as high of a payout as a national tournament which could have a payout of $100,000 or more to the winning team.

== Player ratings ==
Players get ranked depending on how well they play and relative to other players. The higher the rating the better the player. Different tournaments can improve a players rating depending how what level the tournament is played at. National Team members are selected by high performance director Joerg Bitzigeio.

Player Rating Table
Under 1000	Beginners
1000-1700	Intermediate
1400-1700	Average member of USA Table Tennis
1700-1800	Average tournament player
2000	An "Expert" player
2200	A "Master" player
2350-2650	Members of the USA Women's National Team, U15 and U18 National Teams
2550-2800	Members of the USA Men's National Team, and U18 National Team
2750-2950	The best players in the USA

== Tactics during play ==
An article called “Adjusting Tactics in Tournament Play” talks about adjusting in-game techniques to boost the chances of winning.

== Approved equipment ==
A comprehensive list of all the approved equipment that can be used during official tournaments and matches are given. A few pieces of equipment are Butterfly, Cornilleau, Joola, Paddle Palace, and Zero Pong. The paddles and balls must be inspected at the beginning of a match to prevent any cheating or foul play. The tables are cleaned after every match to ensure that play carries on as fluidly as possible. The balls are wiped to remove any dust to keep them as clean as possible to ensure perfect bounces.

== Coaching ==
A coaches salary may range from $25/hr to $80/hr depending on the type of coach. Usually private coaches make more than the average coach. Many coaches that coach professionally have a rank of at least 1800 or higher. However, there are still stories on which those of lower levels have become coaches. To become a certified coach one needs to register either on the USATT website or the USATT hotline. Those ranked higher will usually have an easier time getting certified. Coaches are also allowed to teach at colleges or other institutions to discuss the art of the sport.

== Clubs and club programs ==
- Club Benefits
  - Clubs allow for a better place to play and social environment.
  - These clubs also help breed professional athletes that can not only promote the club itself but the area in which the club is located.
- There are mainly two types of clubs: non-profit and for-profit
  - Non-Profit
    - Majority of the Table Tennis Clubs in the United States
    - Tax-exempt status. If recognized as 501(c) (3) charity statue, donations are tax deductible.
    - Limited legal and financial liability for the board.
    - Organization structure and purpose tend to promote financial and volunteer support.
  - For Profit
    - Usually Competitive Table Tennis Clubs
    - Continuous Focus on Vision and Purpose
    - Owner gets compensation over time and has the ability to build equity
    - Involvement in every aspect of the program
- Clubs are also required to have liability insurance in case there are any accidents towards the customer.
  - USATT Policy
    - Member Policy
      - Cover Member Clubs(as an entity) for actions that may occur from their activities
    - Club Insurance Policy
      - Covers Club from any action that a player may take against the club(regardless of whether the player is a club member or not)
- General Amenities that a club should include are:
  - Wood or Rubber Floors, Lockers, Showers, Weight Rooms, Equipment Store, Office/Front Desk, Training Room, Cafeteria, Changing Room, Lounge.

== Referees ==
The referees have different qualifications depending on the level of the match. The referees that are only at the local level only need low level certification. However the referees that want to go higher need more certification and also years of experience. The referees need to take tests and need to pass with scores of at least 85%.

== Paralympics and Para Table Tennis ==
Para Table Tennis came into the spotlight in 1960 when the sport was incorporated into the 1960 Rome Paralympics. Para Table Tennis was also first included in the Olympic Games in Seoul 1988. Para Table Tennis was treated just as equally as the regular table tennis tournaments in which there are both men's and women's events. Para events are split into classes. Para 1 is the highest level of disability, while para 10 is the lowest level of disability. To put things in perspective, the para 1-5 classes are usually in wheelchair, while some of the para 9 and 10 players can compete on an international level with able bodied people.

== See also ==
- List of table tennis players
- List of United States table tennis champions
