= Angelita Rosal =

American table tennis player and coach

- Born: 1956 (age 69–70)
- Occupation: Professional table tennis athlete
- Years active: 1967–1982
- Organization: United States Table Tennis Association
- Spouse(s): Tom Sistrunk (married 1977); Stellan Bengtsson (married 1985)
- Children: Suco Li, Chris, Sam
- Parent(s): Monico and Kathryn Rosal

Angelita Rosal, also known as Angie Rosal Bengtsson, (born 1956) is an American former professional table tennis player and coach. Born of a Dakota mother of the Spirit Lake Tribe and a Filipino father, Rosal is inducted both in the Indian Athletic Hall of Fame and the United States of America Table Tennis Hall of Fame, the first female to be so honored. She was particularly successful in doubles, winning four US titles.

== Career ==
Angelita Rosal began playing table tennis at the age of nine or ten years old. She attended her first United States Olympic Training Center at age eleven in 1967 and quickly showed her match-winning ability. In 1968, she won the national Under-Thirteen championship, following up the following year winning the Under-Fifteen crown. She continued to be successful, competing in ten USA Table Tennis National titles over her career. She was particularly successful in doubles, winning the title at the U.S. National Table Tennis Champions with He-ja Lee no less than three times, in 1978, 1979 and 1980, and once with Jin Na in 1982.

== Honours ==
- 1973 First female selected to the Indian Athletic Hall of Fame.
- 1996 Inducted into the United States of America Table Tennis Hall of Fame.

== Personal life ==
Rosal was born to a Filipino father and Sioux mother, one of seven children. Two of her siblings, Chris and Monica, were also good table tennis players. The family lived on the Fort Totten, North Dakota, but moved to San Diego before she was eleven.

In 1975, she developed typhoid while in Kolkata and also had a religious conversion. She married Tom Sistruck and had her first child, Succo Li, in 1977. In 1985, she married Stellan Bengtsson with whom she has twin sons, Chris and Sam. She also has two grandchildren, Miles and Monico.
