= Biljana Golić =

Serbian table tennis player

Biba Golić
Personal information
- Full name: Biljana Golić
- Nationality: Serbia
- Born: November 9, 1977 (age 48) Senta, Serbia, SFR Yugoslavia
- Height: 1.70 m (5 ft 7 in)

Sport
- Sport: Table tennis
- Playing style: Right-handed, all round player
Medal record
Women's table tennis
Representing Serbia
Mediterranean Games
Gold medal – first place	2001 Tunis	Women's doubles
European Youth Championships
Bronze medal – third place	1991 Granada	Cadet girls' team

Biljana "Biba" Golić (Serbian Cyrillic: Биљана "Биба" Голић) (born 9 November 1977) is a Serbian table tennis player.

== Early career ==
Biba Golic began playing table tennis at age 9, becoming a member of the Serbian National Cadet team at age 12. She continued playing in the Serbia senior national system for 10 years. Biba became a two-time Yugoslavian Singles Champion. In September 2001, she became the Mediterranean Games Champion in Women's Doubles with Gordana Plavšić. In October 2001, she became a Balkan Champion in Women's Teams, in Women's Singles, in Mixed Doubles (with Bojan Milošević), and a runner-up in Women's Doubles (with Gordana Plavšić).

In 2002, she joined the Bundes League in Germany, where she played for one year. Biba is a member of Killerspin Krew (athletes sponsored by Killerspin).

== Collegiate career ==
Biba attended Texas Wesleyan University for 18 months, on an athletic scholarship. At Texas Wesleyan, Biba became the National Collegiate Champion in singles, doubles, mixed doubles and team table tennis, and was also named the team's Most Valuable Player.

She transferred to the Illinois Institute of Technology, and was the No. 2 ranked NCAA women's player.

== Recent career ==
Since becoming one of the anchors of the "Killerspin Krew", Biba has played competitively and served as a spokesperson to heighten the popularity and awareness of the sport. Often called the "Anna Kournikova of table tennis", Biba was named as one of the "Sexiest Women in Sports" by ESPN in 2005 and appeared in ESPN's original The Body Issue.

She has regularly participated in special events, where she performs exhibition matches. She has made numerous appearances on television news and profile shows, and most recently, in Hollywood feature films.

Some of her recent film and television appearances include:

- Balls of Fury
- Ping Pong Playa
- Welcome to the Parker
- The Best Damn Sports Show Period
- Spike TV - Guys Choice award winner - hottest athlete
- ESPN commercial "Follow Your Sports"
- Mike and Mike in the Morning

As well as being featured in publications such as Time and Rolling Stone. The character Oksana Svedlovigoba in the story arc "Paint the Line", by Penny Arcade was based on her.

== Results and accomplishments ==
- Portland Open Champion
- California Open Champion
- Ohio Open Champion
- US National Collegiate No. 2
- US National Collegiate Champion – Singles, Doubles, Mixed Doubles & Team 2003
- Yugoslavian Champion - Single (twice)
- Yugoslavian Champion - Team (twice)
- Yugoslavian Champion - Mixed Doubles (twice)
- Balkan Champion- Mixed Doubles
- Balkan Champion - Woman's Singles
- Second Place Balkan - Woman's Doubles
- Mediterranean Champion - Woman's Doubles
- Third place - Bulgarian Open- Singles
- Third place -European Junior Championships
- First place - Yugoslavian TOP-12
- Mediterranean Champion - Woman's Doubles
