= Tim Boggan =

American table tennis player, official, and historian

- Born: Joseph R. Boggan; September 24, 1930 (age 95)
- Occupations: Table tennis player, historian, official
- Known for: Author of History of U.S. Table Tennis; member of 1971 Ping-Pong Diplomacy team

Joseph R. "Tim" Boggan (born September 24, 1930) is an American table tennis player, official, and historian. He is the official historian of USA Table Tennis (USATT) and is best known for his exhaustive multi-volume work documenting the history of the sport in the United States.

== Career ==
Boggan served three terms as President of the United States Table Tennis Association (now USA Table Tennis) and spent 14 years as the editor of the organization's national publication. Professionally, he was a professor of English at Long Island University in Brooklyn for over 30 years before retiring to focus on his historical research.

=== Ping-Pong Diplomacy ===
In 1971, Boggan was a member of the historic U.S. delegation that traveled to the People's Republic of China. This event, popularly known as "Ping-pong diplomacy", is credited with beginning the process of normalizing relations between the U.S. and China. Boggan's detailed chronicles of the trip serve as a primary historical record of the delegation's experiences.

== Historical Works ==
Boggan is the author of the monumental series History of U.S. Table Tennis, which consists of over 20 volumes. The series provides a year-by-year account of the sport's development, including tournament results, player biographies, and archival photography. He also authored the book Winning Table Tennis (1976).

== Honors and awards ==
- Inducted into the USA Table Tennis Hall of Fame (1985)
- ITTF Merit Award
- Mark Matthews Lifetime Achievement Award (2006)

== Personal life ==
Boggan's sons, Scott and Eric Boggan, were both accomplished table tennis players and U.S. Men’s Singles Champions; both have also been inducted into the USA Table Tennis Hall of Fame.
