= New York Slice =

Professional Major League Table Tennis team

- Founded: 2025
- League: Major League Table Tennis (MLTT)
- Conference: East Division
- Arena: Westchester Table Tennis Center
- Colors: Red, White, and Black
- Owners: Shweta and Sachin Gangrade
- Head coach: Adam Hugh
- Website: www.mltt.com/mltt-team/new-york-slice

The New York Slice is a professional table tennis team based in the New York metropolitan area. The franchise was announced as one of two expansion teams for the league's third season in early 2025.

In May 2025, the league announced the sale of the team to Shweta and Sachin Gangrade, pharmaceutical executives and racquet sports enthusiasts. The Slice made their official competitive debut in September 2025.

Major League Table Tennis announced on July 10, 2025, that the China National Tourist Office New York has signed a one-year sponsorship with the N.Y. Slice for their inaugural season.

== Roster ==
The roster features a mix of international players and U.S. National Team veterans.

Player	Nationality	Status/Notes
Koki Niwa	Japan	Two-time Olympic medalist; top Season 3 draft pick
Tao Wenzhang	China	
Choi Haeeun	South Korea	2023 Korean National Champion (Doubles)
Jishan Liang	United States	Known as "All In"
Yiran Wu	China	2024 Westchester Open Champion
Kaden Xu	United States	Nine-time Westchester Open winner
Haocheng Wang	China	
Jessica Reyes Lai	United States	Joined December 2025

== Personnel ==
- Head Coach: Adam Hugh, a six-time U.S. Men’s National Team member and former U.S. National Champion.
- Owners: Shweta & Sachin Gangrade.

== Venue ==
The Slice uses Westchester Table Tennis Center in Pleasantville, New York, as its home training center. The team hosted its first home league event there from November 7–9, 2025.
