= Lily Yip =

American table tennis player (born 1963)

Personal information
- Full name: Shui-Ling Yip
- Nationality: United States
- Born: August 22, 1963 (age 63) Guangzhou

Sport
- Sport: Table tennis
- Playing style: Chinese penhold, short pips out
Medal record
Women's table tennis
Representing United States
Pan American Games
Gold medal – first place	1991 Havana	Doubles
Gold medal – first place	1991 Havana	Team
Silver medal – second place	1991 Havana	Singles
Silver medal – second place	1995 Mar del Plata	Singles
Silver medal – second place	1995 Mar del Plata	Team
Silver medal – second place	2003 Santo Domingo	Doubles

Shui-Ling Yip
- Traditional Chinese: 葉瑞玲
- Simplified Chinese: 叶瑞玲
Transcriptions
Standard Mandarin
- Hanyu Pinyin: Yè Ruìlíng
Yue: Cantonese
- Yale Romanization: Yip6 Seui6 Ling4
- Jyutping: Jip6 Seoi6 Ling4

Shui-Ling "Lily" Yip (born August 22, 1963) is a Chinese-born American table tennis player and coach.

Yip resides in Warren Township, New Jersey and is the director of the Lily Yip Table Tennis Center in Dunellen, New Jersey, one of seven "National Centers of Excellence" recognized by USA Table Tennis.

== Biography ==
In 1970, at the age of 7, Yip began playing table tennis in Guangzhou.

In 1975, at the age of 12, Yip began playing table tennis professionally.

In 1978, at age 15, Yip went on to become a member of the Guangdong provincial team.

In 1987, Yip moved to the United States, obtaining American citizenship four years later, in 1991.

Yip studied computer science at Middlesex County College.

Between 1991 and 2003, Yip participated in three Pan American Games, winning two gold and four silver medals. She also played in nine World Championships and three World Team Cups.

At the 1992 and 1996 Olympics, Yip competed in women's singles and doubles.

From 1992 through 1995, at the US National Championships, Yip was the runner-up in women's singles four times and won the women's doubles title four consecutive times.

In 2004, Yip was inducted into the USA Table Tennis Hall of Fame.

In 2004, 2010, and 2013, Yip was named USATT National Coach of the Year.

In 2005, Yip and her son Adam Hugh became national champions in mixed doubles.

In 2006, Yip and her daughter Judy Hugh won the women's doubles title at the US Open.

In 2026, Yip appeared in a commercial for Ensure Max Protein called "Lily Yip Doesn't Play Like She's 62".

Yip was awarded the 2026 Mark Matthews Lifetime Achievement Award by the US Table Tennis Hall of Fame
