= Cheng Yinghua =

American table tennis player (born 1958)

Personal information
- Native name: 成应华 (Chéng yīng huá)
- Nickname: Chen
- Nationality: Chinese-American
- Born: November 24, 1958 (age 67) Yuzhong District, Chongqing, China
- Height: 5 ft 10 in (178 cm)
- Weight: 170 lb (77 kg)

Sport
- Sport: Table tennis
- Playing style: Right-handed, shakehand grip, two-wing looper
- Equipment: Bryce rubbers
- Highest ranking: Top 40 in the world (1980s)

Cheng Yinghua (Chinese: 成应华, born 24 November 1958) is a Chinese-born table tennis player who represented the United States at the 2000 Summer Olympics.

He is a former member of the Chinese national team from 1977 to 1987, a four-time U.S. national men's singles champion, and a member of the USA Table Tennis Hall of Fame. Cheng also co-founded the Maryland Table Tennis Center in 1992 and has been a coach for U.S. Olympic and national teams.

== Early life and Chinese career ==
Cheng was born on 24 November 1958 in Yuzhong District, Chongqing, China. He began playing table tennis around 1972. From 1977 to 1987, he was a member of the Chinese national team. During this period, he partnered with Chen Longcan, an Olympic gold medalist and world champion, to win multiple Chinese National Men's Open Doubles titles in the late 1980s and early 1990s. He was later head coach of the Sichuan Province team in China.

== United States career ==
In 1988, following table tennis becoming an Olympic sport, Cheng was invited by the USA Table Tennis Association to join a resident training program at the Olympic Training Center in Colorado Springs, where he coached U.S. players and juniors. He initially stayed for about a year, then commuted between China and the U.S. for two years before obtaining permanent residency and moving to Maryland with his family in 1991. In 1992, Cheng co-founded the Maryland Table Tennis Center in Gaithersburg, the first successful full-time table tennis club in the United States, alongside Larry Hodges and others. His hometown is Boyds, Maryland.

Cheng became a well known figure in U.S. table tennis, winning the U.S. Open Men's Singles in 1985 and 1993. At the 1985 U.S. Open in Miami Beach, as one of the top 40 players in the world, he defeated Ulf Bengtsson, Eric Boggan, Atanda Musa, and Wen Chia Wu. He also won the 1985 U.S. Open Men's Doubles with Jiang Jialiang, defeating Jan-Ove Waldner and Erik Lindh. In 1998, he won the U.S. Open Men's Doubles with Jean-Michel Saive. Cheng secured four U.S. National Men's Singles Championships and multiple U.S. Doubles Championships. In 1994, he won the men's division at the National All-Star table tennis competition. Internationally, representing the U.S., he competed at the 2000 Sydney Olympics, finishing 25th in men's doubles and 33rd in men's singles. He participated in World Championships in events from 1995 to 2008, with his best result being 17th in men's doubles in 1995. In 1995, at age 37, he defeated Jan-Ove Waldner during an event in Atlanta, and the U.S. team earned a bronze medal at the World Team Table Tennis Championships.

== Coaching career ==
Cheng has been a full-time coach sponsored by JOOLA and is a USATT-certified national coach. He was named U.S. National Coach of the Year in 1997. He has served as a coach and trainer for U.S. Olympic and national teams.

== Honors ==
Cheng was inducted into the USA Table Tennis Hall of Fame.
