= Ilija Lupulesku =

Table tennis player (born 1967)

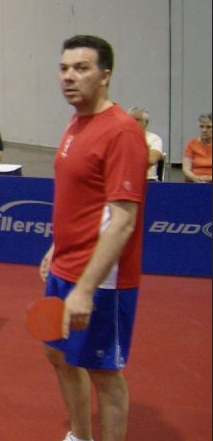
- Ilija Lupulesku

Personal information
- Full name: Ilija Lupulesku
- Nationality: Yugoslavia; Yugoslavia; United States
- Born: 30 October 1967 (age 58) Zrenjanin, SR Serbia, SFR Yugoslavia
- Height: 5 ft 11 in (180 cm)

Sport
- Sport: Table tennis
- Playing style: Left-handed
Medal record
Men's table tennis
Representing (Socialist Federal Republic of Yugoslavia) / (Federal Republic of Yugoslavia) Yugoslavia
Olympic Games
Silver medal – second place	1988 Seoul	Doubles
World Championships
Silver medal – second place	1987 New Delhi	Doubles
Silver medal – second place	1991 Chiba City	Team
World Cup
Bronze medal – third place	1990 Seoul	Doubles
European Championships
Gold medal – first place	1988 Paris	Mixed Doubles
Gold medal – first place	1990 Gothenburg	Doubles
Gold medal – first place	1998 Eindhoven	Mixed Doubles
Silver medal – second place	1986 Prague	Mixed Doubles
Silver medal – second place	1988 Paris	Doubles
Silver medal – second place	1998 Eindhoven	Doubles
Silver medal – second place	2000 Bremen	Doubles
Silver medal – second place	2000 Bremen	Mixed Doubles
Bronze medal – third place	1986 Prague	Doubles
Bronze medal – third place	1992 Stuttgart	Doubles
Mediterranean Games
Gold medal – first place	1987 Latakia	Doubles
Gold medal – first place	1987 Latakia	Mixed Doubles
Gold medal – first place	1991 Athens	Doubles
Bronze medal – third place	1987 Latakia	Singles

Ilija Lupulesku (Serbian Cyrillic: Илија Лупулеску; Romanian: Ilia Lupulescu; born October 30, 1967) is a former Yugoslavian and later American table tennis player who competed at the 1988, 1992, 1996, 2000 and 2004 Summer Olympics. He became a naturalized U.S. citizen in 2002 and competed for the United States from 2004 to 2006. Ilija Lupulesku played his first game of table tennis at age nine in his small hometown of Uzdin, Yugoslavia. After seeing other children playing at his local school, he picked up a paddle and began what would become his life's ambition. Despite his love and talent for soccer, Lupulesku, under the watchful eye of first coach Jon Bosika, committed himself to training and by age 14 was the top player on the Yugoslavian Junior National Table Tennis Team.

== Early career ==
Ilija Lupulesku is of Romanian origins. In 1988 he won the Seoul Olympic silver medal in the men's doubles together with Croatian Zoran Primorac. In 1991 regarded as one of the best players in the sport and also made up one-half of what many at the time called the greatest doubles team ever. Between 1989 and 1991, Lupulesku and doubles mate Primorac reached the semifinals or finals of every major tournament in the world. But by the end of 1991, war ripped through the region and the Croatian Primorac and Yugoslavian Lupulesku were no longer permitted to play together. While Primorac moved on to live and play in Belgium, Lupulesku remained in FR Yugoslavia and joined the military, where he continued to train.

A year later he competed as an Independent Olympic Participant but was eliminated in the first round in singles and in the quarterfinals in doubles. In 1996 and 2000 he competed for FR Yugoslavia and in 2004 he participated for the United States. He thus competed under four different flags, a label shared by Serbian shooter Jasna Šekarić.

From 1992 to 1997 he was married to Jasna Fazlić.

== Results and Accomplishments ==
- Four-time US Men's Singles Champion (2002, 2003, 2005, 2007)
- Five-time US Men's Doubles Champion (2003, 2004, 2005, 2007, 2010)
- 2003 US Mixed Doubles Champion
- 2001 & 2002 North American Team Champion
- 1990 European Men's Doubles Champion, three-time Runner-up
- 1988 Olympic Silver Medalist, Men's Doubles
- 1987 World Championships Men's Doubles Finalist
- Two-time European Mixed Doubles Champion, two-time Runner-up
- Four-time Yugoslavian Men's Singles Champion
- Ten-time Men's Doubles and ten-time Mixed Doubles Champion

He is one of seven table tennis players to have competed at the first five Olympics since the sport was introduced to the Games in 1988. The others are Swede Jörgen Persson, Croatian Zoran Primorac, Belgian Jean-Michel Saive, Hungarian Csilla Bátorfi, Swede Jan-Ove Waldner, and German Jörg Roßkopf.

== See also ==
- List of table tennis players
- List of athletes with the most appearances at Olympic Games
