= Danny Seemiller =

American table tennis player (born 1954)

Daniel Seemiller
- Born: June 13, 1954 (age 72); Pittsburgh, Pennsylvania, U.S.
- Occupations: Professional Table Tennis Athlete, Head Coach and Author
- Employer: South Bend Table Tennis Club
- Known for: Seemiller Grip
- Notable work: USA Olympic Coach, USA National Team Coach and Author
- Style: Seemiller Grip (Left Hand)
- Height: 5 ft 9 in (1.74 m)
- Spouse: Val Seemiller
- Children: 2

Danny Seemiller is an American table tennis coach and former professional player. He was the United States Olympic head coach and is the current head coach of the South Bend Table Tennis Club. He has an unorthodox playing style called the Seemiller grip, which he is famous for inventing in the 1970s.

== Career ==
Seemiller began playing table tennis as an early adolescent in the 1960s. By 1972, he was the top player on the U.S. Men's National Team. He won five United States Men's Singles Championships (1976, 1977, 1980, 1982, and 1983). Seemiller reached #19 in the World Rankings and is considered one of the best American table tennis athletes of all time.

From 1990 to 1995 he served as President of United States Table Tennis Association (now called USA Table Tennis). He was inducted into the US Table Tennis Hall of Fame in 1995.

In 1996, he moved to New Carlisle, Indiana and became the head coach for the South Bend Table Tennis Club. At South Bend, he has developed top US players Mark Hazinski, Joey Cochran, Jared Lynch, A.J. Brewer, and Dan Seemiller Jr, all of whom are former members of the US National Team.

== Personal life ==
Seemiller was a dual sport athlete as a teen, playing both table tennis and baseball. Seemiller was drafted by the Pittsburgh Pirates in the 1970s as a shortstop/2nd baseman, but declined their farm league team offer to further pursue his table tennis career. Danny is an author of two books, "Winning Table Tennis" (1996) and "Revelations of a Ping-Pong Champion" (2016).
