= USA Table Tennis =

American nonprofit sport governing body

- Abbreviation: USATT
- Formation: 1933
- Type: NPO
- Purpose: Sport governing body
- Headquarters: Colorado Springs, Colorado, U.S.
- Region served: United States
- Fields: Table tennis
- Members: 14,000
- CEO: Virginia Sung
- Main organ: Board of Directors
- Staff: 12 FTEs
- Website: usatt.org

USA Table Tennis, colloquially known as USATT, is the non-profit governing body for table tennis in the United States and is responsible for cataloging and sanctioning table tennis tournaments within the country. It was founded in 1933 as the United States Table Tennis Association. USATT has over 14,000 members. The headquarters of USA Table Tennis is located in Colorado Springs, Colorado, United States, which is also home to the United States Olympic Training Center. USA Table Tennis offers a $100,000 incentive for American Olympic table tennis athletes, though no American athlete has ever won a medal for table tennis.

== History ==
The United States Table Tennis Association was created in 1933. The phrase "Table Tennis" was created because the name "Ping Pong" had already been trademarked by Parker Brothers. Though the legal name of the USATT remains the "United States Table Tennis Association, Inc.", the non-profit corporation adopted "USA Table Tennis" as their d/b/a name effective 1994.

== Members ==
Although about 19 million Americans play for recreation, USATT has only about 14,000 members, as of November 2024. There are two main membership types, Basic and Pro. Basic members can participate in USATT sanctioned events (0-4 star) and leagues with no additional rating fees while Pro members can also participate in 5 star events such as the National Championships and US Open. There are 3 levels to USATT memberships: bronze ($25), silver ($50), and gold ($100). There is also a lifetime membership for $1300. There are over 250 table tennis clubs affiliated with USATT.

== Major sanctioned tournaments ==
=== U.S. Open ===
Started in 1931, the annual U.S. Open is the oldest table tennis event in the United States. It attracts over 1400 athletes annually. The U.S. Open has been previously held in various locations, including Anaheim, California; Charlotte, North Carolina; Chicago, Illinois; Las Vegas, Nevada, Fort Lauderdale, Florida, and Grand Rapids, Michigan. Past Men's Singles champions include Jan-Ove Waldner and Kanak Jha. Past Women's Singles champions include Lily Zhang and Amy Wang.

The 2010 U.S. Open was held at the DeVos Place Convention Center in Grand Rapids, MI, between June 29 and July 3. The Men's Singles champion was Sharath Kamal of India and the Women's Singles champion was Georgina Pota of Hungary.

The 2011 U.S. Open was held in Milwaukee, Wisconsin. The Men's Singles champion was Thomas Keinath of Slovakia. The Women's Singles Champion was Nai Hui Liu of New Jersey.

=== U.S. Nationals ===
The U.S. Nationals have been held since 1976. The tournament is closed to non-citizens of the United States. In addition, the U.S. Nationals along with two other national ranking tournaments determine the members selected USA Table Tennis Adult, Cadet, and Junior Teams. Over 750 athletes registered for the 2017 U.S. Nationals, which were held in Las Vegas, Nevada. Past Men's Singles champions include Kanak Jha, Eric Owens and David Zhuang and past Women's Singles champions include Lily Zhang, Jasna Reed and Wang Chen.

== National Teams ==
=== Coaches ===
Team	National Team Coach	Men's Team Coach	Para Team Coaches
2026	Gao Jun	Mark Hazinski	Jasna Rather, Vlad Farcas, Mitch Seidenfeld
2025	Gao Jun	Mark Hazinski	Jasna Rather, Vlad Farcas, Mitch Seidenfeld
2024	Gao Jun	Mark Hazinski	Jasna Rather, Vlad Farcas, Mitch Seidenfeld

=== Players ===
Event	Men's Team	Women's Team
2025 World Championships	Kanak Jha, Jishan Liang, Nandan Naresh, Sid Naresh	Lily Zhang, Amy Wang, Sally Moyland, Jessica Reyes-Lai
2024 Olympic Games	Kanak Jha	Lily Zhang, Amy Wang, Rachel Sung

=== Junior Players ===
Event	U19 Boy's Team	U19 Girl's Team	U17 Boy's Team	U17 Girl's Team	U15 Boy's Team	U15 Girl's Team	U13 Boy's Team	U13 Girl's Team	U11 Boy's Team	U11 Girl's Team
2026	Daniel Tran, Darryl Tsao, Anav Gupta, Alex Luo, Andrew Cao, Aryan Jha, Kef Noorani, Ryan Lin	Sally Moyland, Irene Yeoh, Satya Aspathi, Lillian Ma, Hildy Chen, Isabella Luo, Mandy Yu, Tashiya Piyadasa	Charles Shen, Tanish Pendse, Ryan Lin, Vishal Sivakumar, Lucas Wu, William Feng, Sivaraam Velyayuthem, Keshev Sridhar	Irene Yeoh, Mandy Yu, Abigail Yu, Dariah Feng, Anagha Kasichainula, Anya Shanbag, Hildy Chen, Emma Jiao	Chirag Pradhan, Kyler Chen, Lucas Wu, Jayden Cai, Carlough Francis, Tanish Mamidyala, Stephen Lu	Irene Yeoh, Abigail Yu, Isabella Luo, Tiana Piyadasa, Anya Shanbhag, Elysia Huang, Anagha Kashinachula, Angela He	Chirag Pradhan, Ethan Zhou, Jacob Kordus, Saivaishnav Senthikumar, Joey Yang, Allen Mao, Hudson Yang	Anya Shanbhag, Emma Yang, Shreya Venkateraman, Julia Zhu, Clarice Ho, Allison Zhang, Isabella Joseph, Amanda Liu	Allen Mao, William Jin, Leo Shao, Shuban Baviskar, William Zhang, Aaron Li, Vincent Wu, Yug Sinha	Mia Yang, Shreya Srinivasan, Zoe Truong, Olivia Yang, Sophia Ferreira, Mira Shanbag, Averie Zhao, Faye Wang

== Current sponsorships ==
- Butterfly
- Nittaku Paddle Place
- United States Performance Center
- 888 National Training Center

== See also ==
- Glossary of table tennis
- International Table Tennis Federation
- List of USA Table Tennis Athletes at Major Events
- List of USA Table Tennis champions
- Table tennis at the Summer Olympics
- United States Olympic Committee
