= Jasna Fazlić =

Yugoslav American table tennis player

Jasna Rather
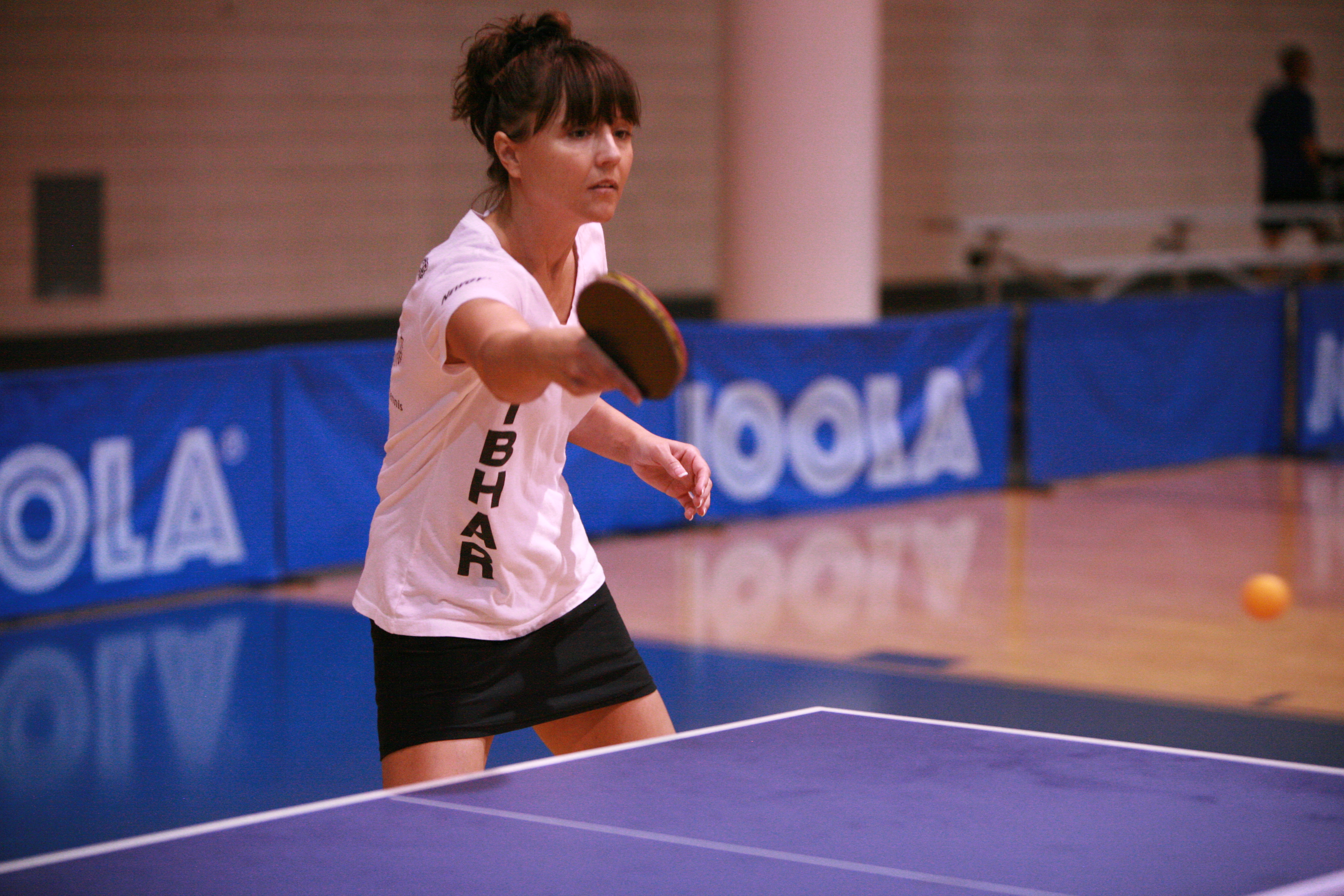
- Rather in 2008

Personal information
- Full name: Jasna Fazlić Rather
- Nationality: Bosnia and Herzegovina; United States
- Born: Jasna Fazlić; December 20, 1970 (age 55) Foča, SR Bosnia and Herzegovina, SFR Yugoslavia

Sport
- Sport: Table tennis
- Playing style: Offensive power looper
Medal record
Women's table tennis
Representing Yugoslavia
Olympic Games
Bronze medal – third place	1988 Seoul	Doubles
Representing United States
Pan American Games
Gold medal – first place	2003 Santo Domingo	Doubles

Jasna Rather (née Fazlić; December 20, 1970) is an American former table tennis player who played for Yugoslavia and then for the United States, competing on four Olympics: in Seoul 1988 Summer Olympics, Barcelona 1992 Summer Olympics, Sydney 2000 Summer Olympics, and Athens 2004 Summer Olympics respectively.

== Olympics participation ==
In 1988, she won the bronze medal for Yugoslavia in the women's doubles together with Gordana Perkučin. Four years later she competed as an Independent Olympic Participant. In 2000 and 2004 she participated for the United States.

== Personal life ==
Jasna lived in Zagreb for the most of her childhood and youth. From 1992 to 1997, she was married to Ilija Lupulesku. After separating from Lupulesku in 1996, she played in Japan for a short while, then moved to the United States. After her divorce she legally changed her name to Reed. Jasna got married on August 20, 2009, to William H. Rather IV, and changed her last name to Rather. Jasna and William have one daughter, Izabel Rather.

== Coaching ==
As of 2006, she is the Head Table Tennis Coach at Texas Wesleyan University. Since the inception of the table tennis program at Texas Wesleyan University, the team has brought back to Texas 69 collegiate national titles in team, singles and doubles events.

== Table tennis career ==
- 1988, 1992, 2000, 2004 Olympian
- 1988 Bronze Olympic Medal (Seoul Korea)
- 1988 and 1992 European Champion
- 2003 and 2005 US women's singles champion
- Inducted into the US Table Tennis Hall of Fame December 2011
