= Barbara Chiu =

Canadian table tennis player (born 1964)

Personal information
- Full name: Chiu Barbara
- Nationality: Canada
- Born: July 14, 1964 (age 62) Canton, China

Sport
- Sport: Table tennis
Medal record
Women's table tennis
Representing Canada
Pan American Games
| Gold medal – first place | 1995 Mar del Plata | Team |
| Bronze medal – third place | 1995 Mar del Plata | Singles |
| Bronze medal – third place | 1995 Mar del Plata | Mixed Doubles |

Barbara Chiu (born July 14, 1964) is a table tennis player from Canada. She competed at the 1992 Summer Olympics and the 1996 Summer Olympics.
