= Wenguan Johnny Huang =

Canadian table tennis player

Personal information
- Nationality: Canada
- Born: October 5, 1962 (age 63)

Sport
- Sport: Table tennis
Medal record
Men's table tennis
Representing Canada
World Cup
Bronze medal – third place	1993 Guangzhou	Singles
Commonwealth Championship
Gold medal – first place	1991 Nairobi	Singles
Gold medal – first place	1994 Hyderabad	Singles
Gold medal – first place	1994 Hyderabad	Doubles
Silver medal – second place	2002 Singapore	Singles
North American Championships
Gold medal – first place	1992 Ste Hyacinthe	Singles
Gold medal – first place	1992 Ste Hyacinthe	Doubles
Gold medal – first place	1993 Augusta	Singles
Gold medal – first place	1994 Laval	Team
Gold medal – first place	1995 South Bend	Singles
Gold medal – first place	1995 South Bend	Doubles
Gold medal – first place	1996 Edmonton	Singles
Gold medal – first place	1996 Edmonton	Doubles
Gold medal – first place	1997 Flint	Singles
Gold medal – first place	1998 Winnipeg	Singles
Gold medal – first place	1999 Fort Lauderdale	Singles
Gold medal – first place	2001 Fort Lauderdale	Singles
Gold medal – first place	2002 Edmonton	Singles
Gold medal – first place	2003 San Diego	Singles
Gold medal – first place	2004 Chicago	Singles
Silver medal – second place	1991 Laval	Singles
Bronze medal – third place	1994 Laval	Singles

Chinese name
- Traditional Chinese: 黃文冠
- Simplified Chinese: 黄文冠
- Hanyu Pinyin: Huáng Wénguān

Wenguan Johnny Huang (born October 5, 1962) is a Chinese-born Canadian male former table tennis player. From 1991 to 2004 he won several medals in singles, doubles, and team events in the North American Table Tennis Championships. He won a bronze medal in the Table Tennis World Cup in 1993. After his retirement from sport in 2005, he went into various lines of business, including marketing, real estate development, and asset management. In 2016 he became co-chairman and executive director of Jete Power Holdings, a Chinese metalworking company.
