= Crystal Huang =

American table tennis player

Personal information
- Nationality: United States
- Born: Huang Yaoxi; July 6, 1979 (age 47) Changsha, Hunan, China
- Height: 5 ft 3 in (1.60 m)
- Weight: 110 lb (50 kg)

Sport
- Sport: Table tennis
- Playing style: Left-handed, penhold attacker
- Highest ranking: 196 (June 2009)
- Current ranking: 259 (October 2010)

Crystal Huang (born Huang Yaoxi, (Note: In this Chinese name, the family name is Huang.) simplified Chinese: 黄姚熹; traditional Chinese: 黃姚熹; pinyin: Huáng Yáoxī; July 6, 1979) is an American table tennis player of Chinese origin.

== Background ==
Huang earned a spot on the U.S. team for the 2008 Summer Olympics in Beijing, by placing first over Canada's Zhang Mo in the women's singles from the North American Qualification Tournament in Vancouver. Huang joined with her fellow players Wang Chen and five-time Olympian Gao Jun for the inaugural women's team event. She and her team placed second in the preliminary pool round, receiving a total of five points, two victories over the Netherlands and Nigeria, and a single defeat from the Singaporean trio Wang Yuegu, Li Jiawei, and Feng Tianwei. The U.S. team offered another shot for the bronze medal by defeating Romania in the first play-off, but lost their next match to South Korea, with a unanimous set score of 0–3. In the women's singles, Huang lost the preliminary round match to Congo's Yang Fen, attaining a set score of 2–4.

As of October 2010, Huang is ranked no. 196 in the world by the International Table Tennis Federation (ITTF). She is also left-handed, and uses the penhold grip. Huang currently resides with her family in San Gabriel, California, and obtains a dual citizenship.
