= Michelle Do =

American table tennis player

Michelle Do (born 5 June 1983) is a Vietnamese-American table tennis player from Milpitas, California. At age 17, Do became the youngest ever member of the U.S. Women's Table Tennis Team, for the 2000 Summer Olympics. She attended Notre Dame High School (San Jose, California).
