= Table tennis at the Summer Olympics =

- IOC Code: TTE
- Governing body: ITTF
- Events: 6 (men: 2; women: 2; mixed: 2)

Summer Olympics
- 1896; 1900; 1904; 1908; 1912; 1920; 1924; 1928; 1932; 1936; 1948; 1952; 1956; 1960; 1964; 1968; 1972; 1976; 1980; 1984; 1988; 1992; 1996; 2000; 2004; 2008; 2012; 2016; 2020; 2024; 2028; 2032
- Medalists

Table tennis competition has been in the Summer Olympic Games since 1988, with singles and doubles events for men and women. Athletes from China have dominated the sport, winning a total of 66 medals in 42 events, including 37 out of a possible 42 gold medals, and only failing to win at least one medal in one event, the inaugural men's singles event at the 1988 Summer Olympics.

== Summary ==
Games	Year	Events	Best nation
24	1988	4	China (1)
25	1992	4	China (2)
26	1996	4	China (3)
27	2000	4	China (4)
28	2004	4	China (5)
29	2008	4	China (6)
30	2012	4	China (7)
31	2016	4	China (8)
32	2020	5	China (9)
33	2024	5	China (10)
34	2028	6	

== Events ==
In 1992 (only), two bronze medals were awarded in each event. In 2008, the doubles events were replaced by team events to lessen the emphasis on doubles play. Chinese table tennis team won 8 medals and made podium sweeps on the men's and women's singles events at the 2008 Summer Olympics. Due to China's dominance in the sport, the format was changed for the 2012 Olympics so that each NOC may enter up to two competitors in singles events. With gender equality a big focus, mixed doubles event became one of the nine new mixed-gender events at the 2020 Summer Olympics. The IOC will introduce the mixed team event for the 2028 Summer Olympics, while the men's and women's team events will be dropped and in their places are scheduled to be reinstated as men's and women's doubles events.

Event	88	92	96	00	04	08	12	16	20	24	28	Years
Men's singles	X	X	X	X	X	X	X	X	X	X	X	11
Men's doubles	X	X	X	X	X						X	6
Men's team						X	X	X	X	X		5
Women's singles	X	X	X	X	X	X	X	X	X	X	X	11
Women's doubles	X	X	X	X	X						X	6
Women's team						X	X	X	X	X		5
Mixed doubles									X	X	X	3
Mixed team											X	1
Events	4	4	4	4	4	4	4	4	5	5	6	

== Medal table ==
Updated after the 2024 Olympics.

Rank	Nation	Gold	Silver	Bronze	Total
1	China	37	21	8	66
2	South Korea	3	3	14	20
3	Japan	1	4	5	10
4	Sweden	1	3	1	5
5	Germany	0	4	5	9
6	North Korea	0	2	3	5
7	France	0	1	3	4
8	Chinese Taipei	0	1	2	3
8	Singapore	0	1	2	3
10	Hong Kong	0	1	1	2
10	Yugoslavia	0	1	1	2
12	Denmark	0	0	1	1
Totals (12 entries)		42	42	46	130

== Number of athletes by nation ==
In addition to independent Olympians and the Unified Team in 1992, athletes from 108 NOCs had competed in the Olympic table tennis tournaments.

Nation	88	92	96	00	04	08	12	16	20	24	28	Years
Algeria	–	–	–	2	5	1	–	–	1	2		5
Argentina	1	2	–	2	3	2	1	–	2	1		8
Australia	3	2	5	9	6	6	6	6	6	6		10
Austria	2	2	4	5	4	6	6	6	6	2		10
Belarus	URS	EUN	2	5	5	4	3	3	–	AIN		6
Belgium	2	2	2	2	1	1	1	–	–	2		8
Bosnia and Herzegovina	YUG	–	1	–	1	–	–	–	–	–		2
Brazil	2	4	4	3	5	4	6	6	6	6		10
Bulgaria	2	1	–	–	–	–	–	–	1	–		3
Cameroon	–	–	–	–	–	1	1	–	1	1		4
Canada	3	2	5	6	4	5	4	2	3	4		10
Chile	3	3	4	5	4	–	1	–	1	3		8
China	7	8	8	9	9	6	6	6	7	6		10
Chinese Taipei	6	–	6	7	4	5	3	6	6	6		9
Colombia	–	–	–	–	–	1	1	1	–	–		3
Republic of the Congo	–	–	–	–	–	2	3	3	–	1		4
Democratic Republic of the Congo	–	–	–	–	2	–	–	–	–	–		1
Croatia	YUG	2	4	4	3	6	4	1	3	4		9
Cuba	–	4	–	5	–	–	1	2	2	3		6
Czech Republic	TCH		3	2	4	2	2	4	2	1		8
Czechoslovakia	4	5	Dissolved									2
Denmark	–	–	–	2	2	1	3	1	1	3		7
Djibouti	–	–	–	–	–	–	1	–	–	–		1
Dominican Republic	3	–	1	–	2	4	1	–	–	–		5
Ecuador	–	1	–	–	–	–	–	–	1	1		3
Egypt	3	2	–	5	–	5	6	5	6	7		8
Estonia	URS	1	–	–	–	–	–	–	–	–		1
Fiji	–	–	–	–	–	–	–	1	1	1		3
Finland	–	–	–	–	–	–	–	1	–	–		1
France	2	6	6	5	1	4	3	4	6	6		10
Germany	–	5	7	8	8	6	6	6	6	7		9
Ghana	1	2	2	–	–	–	–	–	–	–		3
Great Britain	4	6	4	1	–	–	6	3	3	2		8
Greece	–	–	2	2	4	3	2	1	1	1		8
Guyana	–	–	–	–	–	–	–	–	1	1		2
Honduras	–	–	–	–	1	–	–	–	–	–		1
Hong Kong	6	4	4	4	8	6	6	6	6	4		10
Hungary	5	1	4	3	3	4	4	3	6	3		10
Independent Olympic Athletes	–	5	–	–	–	–	–	–	–	–		1
India	3	4	2	3	2	2	2	4	4	6		10
Indonesia	1	3	2	2	–	–	–	–	–	–		4
Iran	–	1	–	1	1	1	2	3	1	3		8
Iraq	1	–	–	–	–	–	–	–	–	–		1
Israel	–	–	–	–	1	–	–	–	–	–		1
Italy	1	1	3	–	5	3	2	–	1	2		8
Jamaica	1	1	2	–	–	–	–	–	–	–		3
Japan	7	8	8	9	8	6	6	6	6	6		10
Jordan	1	1	–	1	1	1	–	–	–	1		6
Kazakhstan	URS	EUN	–	–	–	1	–	1	2	1		4
Kuwait	–	–	1	–	–	1	1	–	–	–		3
Latvia	URS	–	–	–	–	–	1	–	–	–		1
Lebanon	–	–	1	–	–	–	1	1	–	1		4
Libya	–	1	–	–	–	–	–	–	–	–		1
Lithuania	URS	–	1	2	–	1	–	–	–	–		3
Luxembourg	–	–	–	2	–	1	1	1	2	3		6
Madagascar	–	–	–	–	–	–	–	–	–	1		1
Malaysia	2	–	–	–	–	–	–	–	–	–		1
Maldives	–	–	–	–	–	–	–	–	–	1		1
Mauritius	2	–	–	1	–	–	–	–	–	–		2
Mexico	–	–	1	–	–	1	1	2	–	2		5
Moldova	URS	EUN	–	–	–	–	–	–	–	1		1
Monaco	–	–	–	–	–	–	–	–	1	1		2
Mongolia	–	–	–	–	–	–	–	–	2	–		1
Morocco	–	1	–	–	–	–	–	–	–	–		1
Nepal	–	–	–	–	–	–	–	–	–	1		1
Netherlands	2	3	6	2	2	3	3	3	1	1		10
New Zealand	2	3	1	3	2	–	–	–	–	–		5
Nigeria	6	6	4	7	8	6	4	5	4	4		10
North Korea	–	8	7	–	4	5	6	3	–	3		7
Pakistan	1	–	–	–	–	–	–	–	–	–		1
Paraguay	–	–	–	–	–	1	1	1	–	–		3
Peru	1	4	2	–	1	–	–	–	–	–		4
Philippines	–	–	–	–	–	–	–	1	–	–		1
Poland	3	3	2	2	2	4	4	6	3	5		10
Portugal	–	–	–	–	–	3	4	5	5	5		5
Puerto Rico	–	–	–	–	–	–	–	2	3	3		3
Qatar	–	–	1	1	–	–	1	1	–	–		4
ROC	URS	EUN	RUS						3	AIN		1
Romania	–	4	5	3	4	4	3	5	4	5		9
Russia	URS	EUN	4	3	6	5	5	3	ROC			6
Saudi Arabia	–	1	–	–	1	–	–	–	1	–		3
Senegal	–	–	–	–	1	–	–	–	1	1		3
Serbia	YUG	IOP	SCG			1	2	1	3	1		5
Serbia and Montenegro	YUG	IOP	3	2	3	Dissolved						3
Singapore	–	–	1	2	4	6	6	5	4	3		8
Slovakia	TCH		1	–	–	1	–	3	3	1		5
Slovenia	YUG	1	–	–	–	1	1	1	3	3		6
South Africa	–	2	–	–	–	–	–	–	–	–		1
South Korea	7	8	8	8	9	6	7	6	6	6		10
Soviet Union	5	EUN	Dissolved									1
Spain	–	4	–	–	1	5	5	3	3	2		7
Sudan	–	–	1	–	–	–	–	–	–	–		1
Sweden	4	6	7	6	3	3	3	5	5	6		10
Switzerland	–	–	1	–	–	–	–	–	1	–		2
Syria	–	–	–	–	–	–	–	1	1	–		2
Thailand	–	–	–	1	1	1	1	3	2	3		7
Togo	–	–	–	–	–	–	1	–	1	–		2
Trinidad and Tobago	–	–	1	–	–	1	–	–	–	–		2
Tunisia	4	3	1	1	2	–	–	1	2	–		7
Turkey	–	–	–	–	–	2	2	2	–	1		4
Turkmenistan	–	–	1	1	–	–	–	–	–	–		2
Uganda	–	1	3	1	–	–	–	–	–	–		3
Ukraine	–	–	–	1	–	3	4	2	3	3		6
Unified Team	URS	6	Dissolved									1
United States	3	5	6	8	7	4	4	6	6	4		10
Uzbekistan	URS	EUN	–	–	1	–	–	1	–	–		2
Vanuatu	–	–	–	–	–	1	2	1	1	1		5
Venezuela	2	–	1	2	2	1	1	1	–	–		7
Vietnam	–	–	–	–	1	1	–	–	–	–		2
West Germany	6	GER										1
Yugoslavia	5	Dissolved										1
Nations	41	48	51	48	50	56	57	56	57	60		
Athletes	129	159	166	171	172	171	174	172	173	175		
Year	88	92	96	00	04	08	12	16	20	24	28	

== See also ==
- List of Olympic venues in table tennis
- List of naturalised Olympic table tennis players from China
- Table tennis at the Summer Paralympics
- Table tennis at the Youth Olympic Games
