= Adam Hugh =

Personal information
- Full name: Adam Hugh
- Nationality: United States
- Born: United States
- Height: 5 ft 10 in (178 cm)

Sport
- Sport: Table tennis
- Playing style: Right-handed, All round player
Medal record
Men's table tennis
Representing United States

Adam Hugh
- Traditional Chinese: 丘俊榮
- Simplified Chinese: 丘俊荣
Transcriptions
Standard Mandarin
- Hanyu Pinyin: Qiū Jùnróng

Adam Hugh was the number one table tennis player under sixteen in the United States and is most noted for his victory in the 2003 North American Cadet Championship, as well as the US National Cadet Championship.

Other career accomplishments include finishing third in singles, doubles and team at the ITTF Junior Circuit Tournament in Canada. He finished 11 at the World Cadet Challenge. In the team event, North America lost in the semi-final to Asia 2-3, and Hugh took two points: one over World Cadet finalist and Asian Cadet Champion Jun Mizutani from Japan and the number one cadet from Hong Kong, Li, Kwun Ngai. Hugh finished seventh at the 2003 US Men's Team Trials in Atlanta, missing the US Team basically by one game. If he had beaten De Tran instead of losing 4-3, he would have been the number 4 player who was sent to the world's in Paris. At this event Hugh beat Eric Owens, Brian Pace, David Wang, and Ashu Jain.

In recent years he has beaten:

- Li Yu Xiang three times
- Shao Yu twice
- David Fernández
- Sean Lonergan twice
- Barney Reed twice

== Results and accomplishments ==
- 2006 NCTTA "Rookie of the Year" (5/2006)
- 2006 US Men's National Team member (12/2005)
- 2006 US National Junior Boys' Team member (12/2005)
- 2006 USA Collegiate Men's Team member (12/2005)
- 2006 USA Collegiate Men's Champion (12/2005)
- 2005 USATT Male Athlete of the Year (1/2006)
- 2005 US National Mixed Doubles Champion (12/2005)
- 2005 US National Junior Boys' Champion (12/2005)
- 2005 US National Junior Boys' Team member (12/2004)
- 2005 US National Collegiate Champion (12/2005)
- 2005 US National Collegiate Team member (12/2004)
- 2005 US Under 22 Men's Singles finalist (12/2005)
- 2005 US Men's Singles semi-finalist (12/2005)
- 2005 US Men's Doubles semi-finalist (12/2005)
- 2005 ITTF Pro Tour/ Open Under 30 Men's Singles finalist (7/2005)
- 2005 ITTF Pro Tour/US Open 18 and Under Boys' Singles finalist (7/2005)

== Major League Table Tennis ==
In 2025 Hugh was named coach of New York Slice.

== Personal ==
Hugh is the son of table tennis player and coach Lily Yip.
