= David Zhuang =

Chinese-born American table tennis player

Personal information
- Born: September 1, 1963 (age 63) China

Sport
- Sport: Table tennis
Medal record
Men's table tennis
Representing United States
Pan American Games
Gold medal – first place	1999 Winnipeg	Singles
Gold medal – first place	1999 Winnipeg	Team

David Zhuang (Chinese: 莊永祥; pinyin: Zhuāng Yǒngxiáng, born September 1, 1963) is a professional Chinese-born American table tennis player.

Zhuang began playing table tennis competitively at age 11, and was a professional player at age 12. One of his schoolmates was Jiang Jialiang, the 1985 and 1987 World Table Tennis Champion. David moved to the United States in 1990, and became one of the top players in the country.

Championships won by David Zhuang:

- U.S. Men's Singles, 1994, 1995, 1998, 2000, 2006 and 2008.
- U.S. Men's Doubles, 1992, 1993, 1994, 1999, 2000, 2001, 2003, 2006 and 2008.
- U.S. Mixed Doubles: 1992, 1993, 1994, 1995, 1998, 1999.
- Pan Am Men's Singles: 1999
- Pan Am Men's Teams: 1999
- World Consolation: 1997

He represented the U.S. in the Olympics in 1996, 2000 and 2008.

Zhuang resides in West Windsor Township, New Jersey and is married to Joannie Fu, who is also his coach. Together they have two daughters, Zoe and Cassidy.

He was inducted into the US Table Tennis Hall of Fame in 2003.

In 2006, when he won his fifth national championship, he was 43 years old. The USA Table Tennis magazine printed his photograph on the cover, with the heading, "He's still got it!" In the summer of 2008, he was the sole US male table tennis player competing at the Beijing Olympics. In December 2008, he became the first person to win the US Men's Singles National Championships six times. The USA Table Tennis magazine again printed his photograph on the cover, with the heading "SIX", and an article "The Perfect Year" in the magazine.
