= Amy Feng =

Chinese-born table tennis player

Personal information
- Born: April 9, 1969 (age 57) China

Sport
- Sport: Table tennis
Medal record
Women's table tennis
Representing United States
Pan American Games
Gold medal – first place	1999 Winnipeg	Team
Bronze medal – third place	1999 Winnipeg	Singles

Amy Feng (born Jun Feng (Chinese: 冯军; pinyin: Féng Jūn); April 9, 1969) is a Chinese-born table tennis player who represented the United States at the 1996 Summer Olympics.
