= Mark Hazinski =

American table tennis player (born 1985)

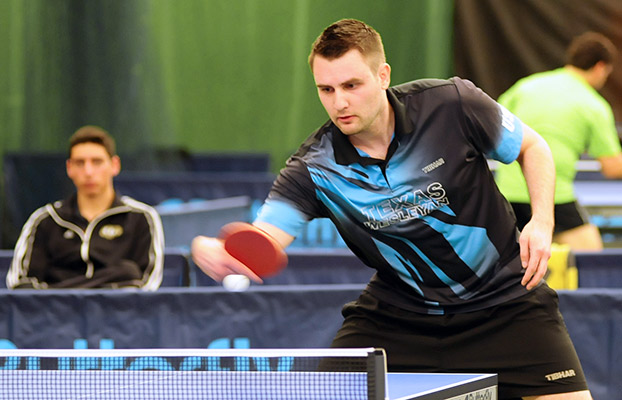
- Hazinski practicing before a match
- Born: April 20, 1985 (age 40); South Bend, Indiana, U.S.
- Education: Sports Medicine (Bachelor of Science)
- Alma mater: Texas Wesleyan University
- Occupation: Professional table tennis player
- Years active: 1994-present
- Notable work: 2004 USA Olympic Athlete
- Style: Shakehand Attacker (right hand)
- Height: 6 ft 4 in (1.93 m)
- Spouse: Shu "Sara" Fu

Medal record

Men's table tennis

Representing United States

Pan American Games
Bronze medal – third place	2007 Rio de Janeiro	Team

Mark "Haz" Hazinski (born April 20, 1985, in South Bend, Indiana) is an American professional table tennis athlete. He started playing table tennis at the age of 9 and by the age of 15 had become the youngest player in the history of United States Table Tennis to make the United States Men's National Table Tennis Team. Hazinski simultaneously represented the United States Men's Team and United States Junior Team for 4 consecutive years (2000–2003).

As a youth Hazinski was professionally trained by United States Olympic Head Coach Danny Seemiller and United States Junior Coach Mark Nordby. Hazinski spent multiple years (2004–2006) playing professional sports leagues in Germany and Sweden. In 2007 Mark decided to put his professional career on hold to attend Texas Wesleyan University on a full scholarship for academics and Table Tennis.

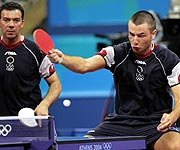
Hazinski (right) hits a backhand shot during the 2004 Olympic Games in Athens, Greece.

== Career ==
Here are some of Hazinski's accolades:

- 2004 United States Olympic team member
- United States Men's National team member
- United States U18 National Team member
- United States Men's U21 National champion (6x gold medalist)
- 2003 United States table tennis Player of the Year
- United States National Men's Singles finalist (4x silver medalist)
- United States Pan American Team member (2007 bronze medalist).
- National Collegiate table tennis Men's Singles champion
- 2011 Most Outstanding Athlete Award (Texas Wesleyan University)
- 2022-2024 U.S. National Team Coach

In Hazinski's early career he trained and played professionally in Europe. From 2004 to 2005 he played for Oberalster VFW Club in Hamburg, Germany, and in 2005-06 he played for Ängby Sportklubb in Stockholm, Sweden. After his season ended in Sweden, Hazinski decided to further pursue an education and attended Texas Wesleyan University. While attending university, he held the # 1 Collegiate Table Tennis position for over 200 consecutive weeks, making him one of the most dominant collegiate players of all time.

== Personal life ==
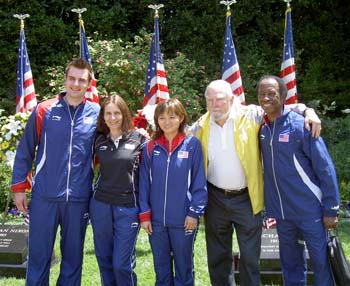
Hazinski (left) at a China/USA Ping Pong Diplomacy Reunion

Hazinski married Shu "Sara" Fu in December 2008. She is from Chengdu, China, but moved to the United States in 2005 to play and coach table tennis in California. Mark graduated from Texas Wesleyan University in May 2012 with a B.S. degree in Sports Medicine.

== Sources ==
- Evans, Hilary; Gjerde, Arild; Heijmans, Jeroen; Mallon, Bill; et al. "Mark Hazinski". Olympics at Sports-Reference.com. Sports Reference LLC. Archived from the original on April 18, 2020.
- "Mark Hazinski". teamusa.org. Team USA. Archived from the original on January 7, 2015.
