= Timothy Wang =

American table tennis player (born 1991)

Personal information
- Nationality: United States
- Born: August 17, 1991 (age 34) Houston, Texas
- Height: 5 ft 9 in (1.75 m)
- Weight: 146 lb (66 kg)

Sport
- Sport: Table tennis
- Playing style: Shakehand

Timothy Wang
- Chinese: 王浩平
Transcriptions
Standard Mandarin
- Hanyu Pinyin: Wáng Hàopíng

Timothy Wang is an American table tennis player. He competed at the 2012 Summer Olympics in the Men's singles, but was defeated in the preliminary round. Wang won the men's singles at the 2010 US National Championships and repeated his victory in 2012 and 2013. He also won the national championship in men's doubles in 2011 and 2012 (with Han Xiao) and in mixed doubles in 2011, 2012 and 2013 (with Ariel Hsing). He represented the United States in the men's team table tennis event at the 2016 Summer Olympics.

== Major League Table Tennis ==
In August 2023, Wang was selected by the Chicago Wind in the inaugural draft of Major League Table Tennis (MLTT). His participation marked a return to professional competition after a period of reduced activity. During the 2023–24 inaugural season, Wang competed as a player for the Wind, contributing to the team's third-place finish in the league standings.

Following the conclusion of the first season, Wang transitioned into a coaching role. In April 2024, the Bay Area Blasters announced the hiring of Wang as their new head coach for the 2024–25 season. In his capacity as coach, Wang oversaw the team's roster construction during the 2024 and 2025 MLTT drafts, including the selection of Yuya Oshima with the first overall pick in 2025.

== Family ==
Wang's parents are both immigrants from Taiwan.
