= Eric Owens (table tennis) =

American table tennis player

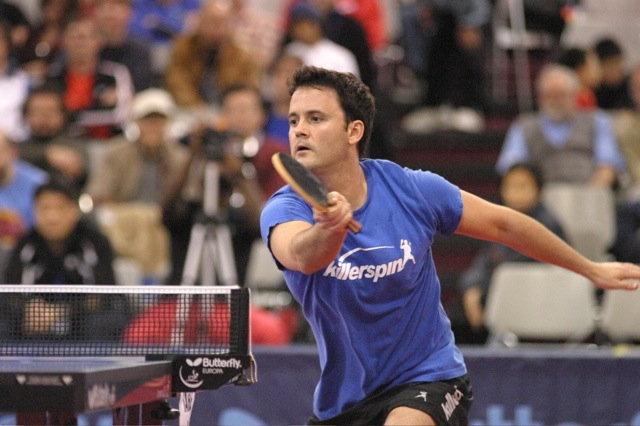
- Owens at 2008 US National Championships

Personal information
- Nationality: United States
- Born: 1975 or 1976 (age 50–51) Houston, Texas, U.S.
- Height: 5 ft 9 in (175 cm)

Sport
- Sport: Table tennis
- Playing style: Right-handed, All round player
Medal record
Men's table tennis
Representing United States
Pan American Games
| Gold medal – first place | 1999 Winnipeg | Team |
| Bronze medal – third place | 2007 Rio de Janeiro | Team |

Eric Owens (born 1975 or 1976) is a professional American table tennis player. Owens began playing and competing in tournaments nationwide at the early age of six. Owens won every major National Junior, and Junior Olympic title. Owens won several major titles, including the US National Championships and North American Championships. He was on the US National Team competing in six (6) World Championships, three (3) Pan-American Games, winning a Gold and Bronze Medal. Owens was inducted to the US Table Tennis Hall of Fame in 2015.

== Early life ==
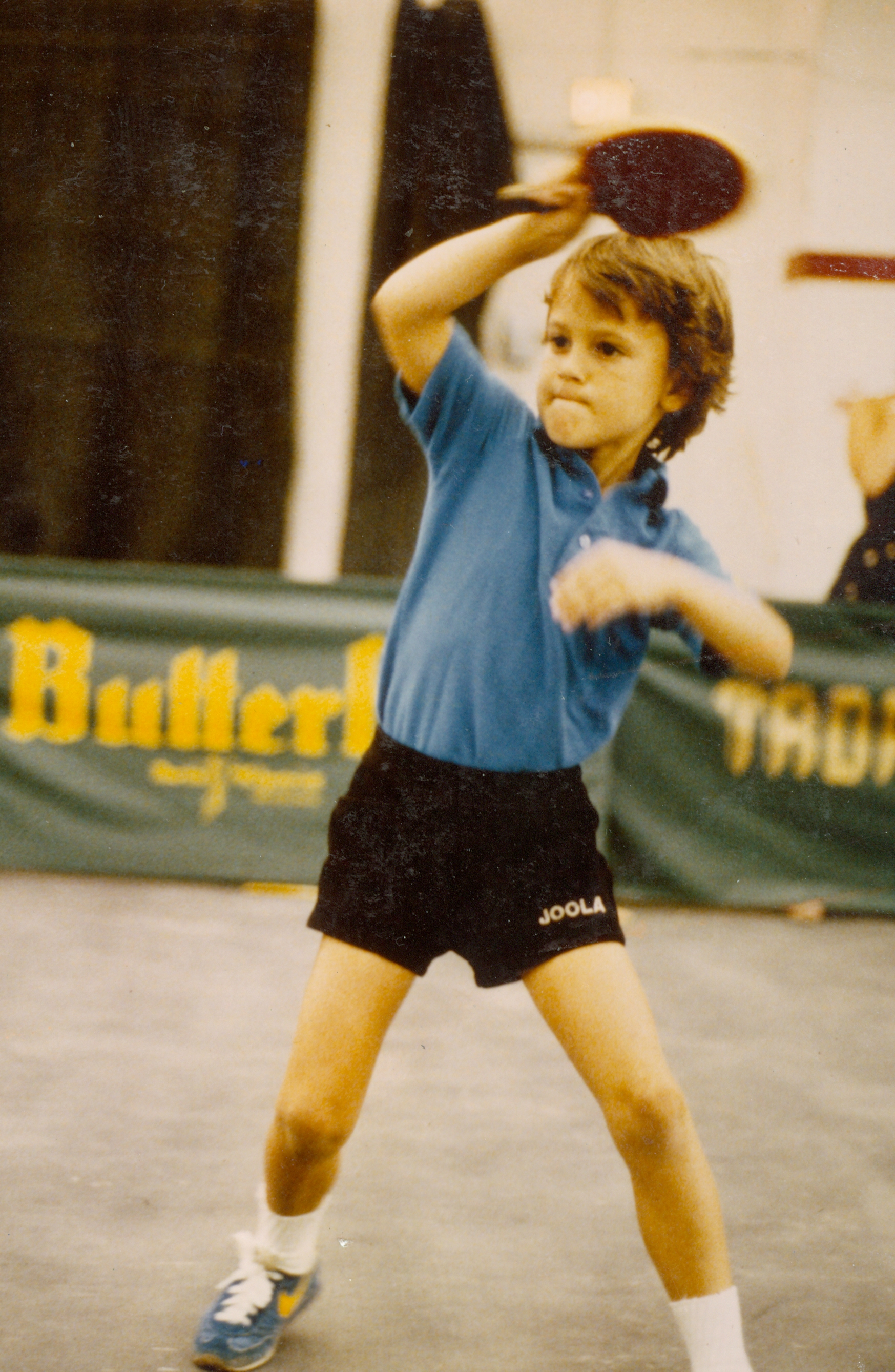
Eric Owens at 1982 US National Championships

Eric Owens was born in Houston, Texas. His father, Kenny Owens, was an average-level tournament player, who was described as a table tennis "fanatic" and strict disciplinarian and loved table tennis. He hired professional table tennis coaches from all over the world including Nigeria, Jamaica, former Yugoslavia, and others, to train Eric very early on.

In 1985, at the age of 9, Eric Owen’s father took him to Sweden to watch the World Championships where he witnessed for the first time elite level professional table tennis. Eric immediately fell in love with the sport and decided that he wanted to be a professional table tennis player.

During this time, Eric was also a competitive distance runner, competing in the National Championships in the 1500m. Owens was the only athlete in his 5 state region (around Texas) to qualify for the National Championships with a sub- 5:40 mile (running a 5:39 in the last race of the season). He later began competing in longer distances and ran in the Dallas White Rock Marathon. At that time, organizers of the marathon only allowed participants of 16+ years but Owens was allowed to compete since he completed the "Torturous 20" twice (a 20-mile race up and down hills in Dallas, TX); he finished the Dallas White Rock Marathon in 4 hours and 6 minutes.

At the age of 10, Owens decided the toll of being a nationally competitive table tennis player and runner was too much so he hung up his shoes and decided to pursue professional table tennis as a sole focus.

== Professional Table Tennis Career ==
Over the years, Eric won every major National Junior, and Junior Olympic title, including U-10, U-12, U-14, U-16, U-18, and U-22 age groups.

Around the age of 16, Owens moved overseas to live and train full-time competing in professional leagues and tournaments in Sweden, Norway, Germany, France, China, Japan, and South Korea; he worked with renowned coaches and players, and competed at an elite international level.

In 1996, Owens qualified as an alternate to the Olympic Team. The next year, he qualified for his first US National Team and then went on to represent the US for the next decade at six (6) world championships and three (3) Pan-American Games and was one of the most successful table tennis players in American history. Owens is the only American born male player in history to win a Gold Medal in the Pan-American Games, win the US National Title in Men's Singles and Doubles, and represent the US National Team at six World Championships.

Highlights of Owens' career and accolades include:

- 1999 Pan American Games Gold Medalist (a first in American table tennis history)
- 2001 National Men’s Singles Champion
- 2002 USA Athlete of the Year
- United States Olympic Committee Olympic Athlete Representative (2002 – 2004): Represented interests of Olympic, Pan-American, and National level athletes; participated in six annual committee meetings related to table tennis topics
- 2007 Pan American Games Bronze Medalist in Men's Team
- 2-time National Men’s Doubles Champion
- 2-time North American Doubles Champion
- 9-time National Team Member

At the age of 26, Eric decided to return to the US to pursue a college degree while continuing to compete in collegiate table tennis.

In 2015, Owens was inducted to the US Table Tennis Hall of Fame recognizing his lifetime accomplishments as a professional table tennis player.

== Education ==
Eric Owens competed in college-level table tennis at Texas Wesleyan University (2002-2006), while majoring in biochemistry/pre-med. He graduated with a bachelor's degree in biochemistry and a minor in physics. Owens had a very successful college career with the following major titles:

- 4-time National Collegiate Men’s Singles Champion
- 3-time National Collegiate Men’s Doubles Champion
- 3-time National Collegiate Mixed Doubles Champion
- 3-time National Collegiate Team Champion

While studying at Texas Wesleyan, Owens also won the following university academic awards:

- Chemistry Junior and Senior of the Year
- Alpha-Chi Academic Honor Society Vice President; members earned top two percent academic status in the class (August 2004 – May 2005)
- Pre-Medical Society President (August 2005 – May 2006)
- Mortar Board National Senior Honor Society; recognizes college seniors for their achievements in scholarship, leadership, and service
- 2006 Pre-Medical Student of the Year
- 2006 University Student of the Year

Owens finished top of his class and graduated magna cum laude in 2006.

In late 2006, Owens moved to Chicago after he signed a contract with Killerspin table tennis as a Professional Athlete. Eric represented the company in national and international table tennis competitions along with participating in international advertising campaigns and publicity efforts. His move to Chicago also allowed him to pursue graduate education with a master's degree in biomedical science from Midwestern University. His Master’s work focused on pain and inflammatory conditions, such as, rheumatoid arthritis.

At that point in his education, Owens wanted to go into research but decided to enter medical school.

During medical school, Owens started a company, Delos Therapy. While in his third year of medical school, one of his classmate's father was seeking treatment for pain. Eric's classmate heard of his innovative approach to treating pain and plans of starting a company and asked if he could help her father. Eric obliged and began treatment out of his apartment. The therapy was successful and quickly grew to other family members and friends ultimately Owens giving 20–30 hours of therapy per week, while carrying a full medical school load. With a growing clientele and in his fourth year, he contacted Mimi Bosika, who has an MBA from Booth in entrepreneurship, to start a formal process of development of Delos Therapy. Together, as they sought investors, a patient provided an initial investment for start-up costs and training therapists. Soon, Delos Therapy was up and running as a full clinic.

At this time, Bosika was a sales manager at David Barton Gym (DBG) and personal friends with David Barton. Delos Therapy was offered a temporary opportunity to utilize vacant massage rooms at the gym, where Delos therapists treated many of the gym’s clients with overuse injuries. As these clients recovered, they were able to resume their gym activities and purchase additional DBG personal training packages. The gym’s revenue dramatically increased and David Barton personally offered Delos Therapy to permanently occupy this River North clinic location. This is where Delos Therapy officially started their operations.

As Delos Therapy gained traction in their new clinic space, Eric trained and managed four therapists, treated patients, created and innovated the Delos Therapy training manual, and managed a full medical school rotation schedule. At the end of his fourth year of medical school, Owens took a leave of absence for six weeks to focus on growing Delos Therapy’s business. Despite his perseverance to complete residency applications, Owens ultimately forwent residency and pursued Delos full-time and did not return to medical school.

== Life After Table Tennis ==
Delos Therapy

Eric Owens at Delos Therapy, Chicago

Eric Owens continues to provide therapy through his business at Delos Therapy (now with 4 clinics and 10 therapists in the Chicago area), which was established in 2012 in Chicago, IL. Delos Therapy specializes in pain, stiffness, and athletic performance.

Owens states that chronic pain remains to be one of the most common among medical complaints. Delos Therapy focuses on the principle that with repetitive motion and wear and tear of muscle tissue, the muscles become tight and fibrotic, causing common symptoms of pain, stiffness, and weakness. This fibrosis is not visible on conventional imaging, such as, MRIs or X-rays; and the fibrosis is getting missed diagnostically by mainstream medicine. Conventional treatments for such tightness and pain include stretching, strengthening, and/or medication management with opioids. Although beneficial in some cases, Owens believes this is not a complete therapy and is largely focused on symptoms rather than the root cause.

Through observational evidence and clinical work, Delos Therapy evangelizes that tight tissue cannot stretch or strengthen effectively if these fibers are fibrotic and immobile. The only parts of the muscle that are stretching and/or strengthening are the parts that are pliable and mobile, which is typically located around the tightness. The therapy focuses on the principle of direct pressure into the tight, fibrotic tissue forcing the individual muscle fibers to stretch apart at the location of the pressure. This is differentiated from a traditional deep tissue massage or foam rolling because these merely glide over the surface of the muscle, rather than force a stretch of the muscle fibers specific to the structure of tightness.

Delos’ therapy breaks up the fibrosis, restructuring the muscle to its original anatomical state, thus restoring normal function, elasticity, range of motion, and dramatic improvements in physical and athletic performance.

Owens considers this his life’s work and intends to conduct research to prove his theories and hopes to make a significant contribution to the field of pain and athletic performance and lay a foundation for further thought and study.

SPiN

In 2016, Owens was approached by SPiN, a ping pong social club, to be a resident "PRO", where he currently organizes tournaments for private and corporate events, wows a crowd with table tennis exhibitions, engages SPiN's customers in table tennis, and provides private table tennis lessons.
