= 2011 World Table Tennis Championships – Mixed doubles =

Mixed doubles at the 2011 World Table Tennis Championships
- Venue: Rotterdam Ahoy
- Location: Rotterdam, Netherlands
- Dates: 9–13 May
- Final score: 11–7, 11–7, 11–9, 9–11, 11–8

Medalists
gold medal	Zhang Chao; Cao Zhen	China
silver medal	Hao Shuai; Mu Zi	China
bronze medal	Cheung Yuk; Jiang Huajun	Hong Kong
bronze medal	Seiya Kishikawa; Ai Fukuhara	Japan

The 2011 World Table Tennis Championships mixed doubles was the 51st edition of the mixed doubles championship.

Li Ping and Cao Zhen were the defending champions. Li did not compete this year and Cao instead teamed up with Zhang Chao.

Zhang Chao and Cao Zhen won in the final against Hao Shuai and Mu Zi 11–7, 11–7, 11–9, 9–11, 11–8. Thus Cao retained her title from 2009 with her second consecutive gold medal in the Mixed Doubles event.

== Seeds ==
Matches will be best of 5 games in qualification matches and best of 7 games in the 128-player sized main draw.

1. (China) Hao Shuai / (China) Mu Zi (final)
2. (China) Zhang Chao / (China) Cao Zhen (world champions)
3. (Hong Kong) Cheung Yuk / (Hong Kong) Jiang Huajun (semifinals)
4. (Japan) Seiya Kishikawa / (Japan) Ai Fukuhara (semifinals)
5. (Hong Kong) Tang Peng / (Hong Kong) Tie Ya Na (third round)
6. (Japan) Kenta Matsudaira / (Japan) Kasumi Ishikawa (fourth round)
7. (Singapore) Yang Zi / (Singapore) Wang Yuegu (quarterfinals)
8. (China) Yan An / (China) Feng Yalan (fourth round)
9. (Singapore) Gao Ning / (Singapore) Li Jiawei (fourth round)
10. (Chinese Taipei) Chuang Chih-yuan / (Chinese Taipei) Cheng I-ching (fourth round)
11. (South Korea) Kim Min-Seok / (South Korea) Yang Ha-Eun (third round)
12. (South Korea) Lee Jung-Woo / (South Korea) Lee Eun-Hee (fourth round)
13. (South Korea) Seo Hyun-Deok / (South Korea) Seok Ha-Jung (quarterfinals)
14. (Turkey) Bora Vang / (Turkey) Sirin He (third round)
15. (Belarus) Evgueni Chtchetinine / (Belarus) Viktoria Pavlovich (quarterfinals)
16. (Romania) Andrei Filimon / (Romania) Elizabeta Samara (third round)
17. (Slovakia) Lubomir Pistej / (Slovakia) Eva Ódorová (second round)
18. (Belarus) Vitaly Nekhvedovich / (Belarus) Veronika Pavlovich (third round)
19. (Serbia) Žolt Pete / (Serbia) Gabriela Feher (second round)
20. (Spain) Carlos Machado / (Spain) Shen Yanfei (third round)
21. (Romania) Adrian Crişan / (Romania) Daniela Dodean (third round)
22. (Hong Kong) Jiang Tianyi / (Hong Kong) Lee Ho Ching (fourth round)
23. (Chinese Taipei) Huang Sheng-sheng / (Chinese Taipei) Huang Yi-hua (fourth round)
24. (Russia) Igor Rubtsov / (Russia) Anna Tikhomirova (second round)
25. (Hungary) Janos Jakab / (Hungary) Georgina Póta (third round)
26. (Czech Republic) Petr Korbel / (Czech Republic) Renata Strbikova (second round)
27. (Russia) Fedor Kuzmin / (Russia) Oxana Fadeeva (third round)
28. (Japan) Kenji Matsudaira / (Japan) Misako Wakamiya (third round)
29. (North Korea) Kim Hyok-Bong / (North Korea) Kim Jong (quarterfinals)
30. (Germany) Zoltan Fejer-Konnerth / (Germany) Zhenqi Barthel (third round)
31. (Czech Republic) Tomas Konecny / (Czech Republic) Iveta Vacenovska (second round)
32. (Dominican Republic) Lin Ju / (Dominican Republic) Wu Xue (third round)
33. (France) Emmanuel Lebesson / (France) Carole Grundisch (third round)
34. (Poland) Wang Zeng Yi / (Poland) Natalia Partyka (third round)
35. (Croatia) Andrej Gacina / (Croatia) Cornelia Molnar (first round, withdrew)
36. (Austria) Stefan Fegerl / (Austria) Li Qiangbing (second round)
37. (Russia) Alexander Shibaev / (Russia) Anastasia Voronova (second round)
38. (Sweden) Mattias Karlsson / (Sweden) Matilda Ekholm (second round)
39. (India) Sharath Kamal / (India) Shamini Kumaresan (second round)
40. (Slovakia) Thomas Keinath / (Slovakia) Barbora Balazova (second round)
41. (Hungary) Daniel Kosiba / (Hungary) Petra Lovas (first round)
42. (North Korea) Ri Chol-Guk / (North Korea) Kim Hye-Song (second round)
43. (Serbia) Marko Jevtović / (Serbia) Anamaria Erdelji (second round)
44. (Spain) Alfredo Carneros / (Spain) Sara Ramirez (second round)
45. (Poland) Jakub Kosowski / (Poland) Katarzyna Grzybowska (third round)
46. (Spain) Jesus Cantero / (Spain) Galia Dvorak (second round)
47. (Germany) Ruwen Filus / (Germany) Kathrin Muhlbach (second round)
48. (Turkey) Jiang Pengfei / (Turkey) Melek Hu (second round)
49. (Czech Republic) Pavel Sirucek / (Czech Republic) Dana Hadačová (second round)
50. (England) Paul Drinkhall / (England) Joanna Parker (second round)
51. (Singapore) Pang Xue Jie / (Singapore) Yu Mengyu (fourth round)
52. (Chinese Taipei) Chen Chien-an / (Chinese Taipei) Liu Hsing-yin (second round)
53. (Australia) William Henzell / (Australia) Lay Jian Fang (second round)
54. (Romania) Ovidiu Ionescu / (Romania) Bernadette Szocs (third round)
55. (Croatia) Tomislav Kolarek / (Croatia) Tian Yuan (second round)
56. (France) Quentin Robinot / (France) Aurore Dessaint (second round)
57. (Belarus) Pavel Platonov / (Belarus) Alexandra Privalova (second round)
58. (England) Darius Knight / (England) Kelly Sibley (second round)
59. (Ukraine) Ivan Katkov / (Ukraine) Ganna Gaponova (second round)
60. (Brazil) Gustavo Tsuboi / (Brazil) Jessica Yamada (first round)
61. (Egypt) Omar Assar / (Egypt) Dina Meshref (second round)
62. (Brazil) Cazuo Matsumoto / (Brazil) Ligia Silva (second round)
63. (India) Amalraj Anthony / (India) Madhurika Patkar (first round)
64. (Malaysia) Muhd Shakirin Ibrahim / (Malaysia) Beh Lee Wei (second round)

== Draw ==
=== Key ===
- Q = Qualifier
- w/o = Walkover
- w/d = Withdraw
- r = Retired
- DQ = Disqualified

=== Finals ===
Quarterfinals
1	(China) Hao Shuai (China) Mu Zi	10	11	11	9	11	11
15	(Belarus) Evgueni Chtchetinine (Belarus) Viktoria Pavlovich	12	7	7	11	7	9
7	(Singapore) Yang Zi (Singapore) Wang Yuegu	9	9	9	11	8
4	(Japan) Seiya Kishikawa (Japan) Ai Fukuhara	11	11	11	7	11
3	(Hong Kong) Cheung Yuk (Hong Kong) Jiang Huajun	7	5	11	11	11	9	11
29	(North Korea) Kim Hyok-Bong (North Korea) Kim Jong	11	11	5	9	4	11	8
13	(South Korea) Seo Hyun-Deok (South Korea) Seok Ha-Jung	11	7	11	4	5	17	6
2	(China) Zhang Chao (China) Cao Zhen	6	11	8	11	11	15	11

Semifinals
1	(China) Hao Shuai (China) Mu Zi	11	11	11	11
4	(Japan) Seiya Kishikawa (Japan) Ai Fukuhara	4	9	4	5
3	(Hong Kong) Cheung Yuk (Hong Kong) Jiang Huajun	7	11	8	7	9
2	(China) Zhang Chao (China) Cao Zhen	11	7	11	11	11

Final
1	(China) Hao Shuai (China) Mu Zi	7	7	9	11	8
2	(China) Zhang Chao (China) Cao Zhen	11	11	11	9	11

=== Top half ===
==== Section 1 ====
First Round
1	(China) Hao S (China) Mu Z	11	11	11	11
Q	(Kazakhstan) Y Beknazarov (Kazakhstan) G Khusseinova	2	2	9	1
Q	(Nigeria) Q Aruna (Nigeria) G Olatunde	11	7	11	6	6	9
62	(Brazil) C Matsumoto (Brazil) L Silva	6	11	8	11	11	11
55	(Croatia) T Kolarek (Croatia) Y Tian	11	11	11	11
Q	(Italy) M Rech Daldosso (Italy) E Trotti	5	6	5	7
Q	(Finland) S Soine (Finland) J Oksanen	2	4	3	6
18	(Belarus) V Nekhvedovich (Belarus) V Pavlovich	11	11	11	11
17	(Slovakia) L Pistej (Slovakia) E Ódorová	11	13	11	11
Q	(Greece) K Lagogiannis (Greece) F Exarchou	7	11	7	3
(Netherlands) D Sliepen (Netherlands) L Creemers	8	10	11	8
33	(France) E Lebesson (France) C Grundisch	11	12	13	11
53	(Australia) W Henzell (Australia) J F Lay	11	11	9	11	6	11
(United States) M Hazinski (United States) A Hsing	5	6	11	8	11	6
Q	(Chile) A Carlier (Chile) B Rodriguez	9	8	5	3
10	(Chinese Taipei) Chuang C-Y (Chinese Taipei) Cheng I-C	11	11	11	11

Second Round
1	(China) Hao S (China) Mu Z	11	11	11	11
62	(Brazil) C Matsumoto (Brazil) L Silva	6	4	5	5
55	(Croatia) T Kolarek (Croatia) Y Tian	11	8	11	11	11	10	9
18	(Belarus) V Nekhvedovich (Belarus) V Pavlovich	4	11	9	9	13	12	11
17	(Slovakia) L Pistej (Slovakia) E Ódorová	6	8	11	10	12
33	(France) E Lebesson (France) C Grundisch	11	11	8	12	14
53	(Australia) W Henzell (Australia) J F Lay	5	10	12	5
10	(Chinese Taipei) Chuang C-Y (Chinese Taipei) Cheng I-C	11	12	14	11

Third Round
1	(China) Hao S (China) Mu Z	11	11	8	11	12	12	11
18	(Belarus) V Nekhvedovich (Belarus) V Pavlovich	8	13	11	4	10	14	7
33	(France) E Lebesson (France) C Grundisch	8	9	11	8	13	11	8
10	(Chinese Taipei) Chuang C-Y (Chinese Taipei) Cheng I-C	11	11	9	11	11	2	11

Fourth Round
1	(China) Hao S (China) Mu Z	11	11	11	11
10	(Chinese Taipei) Chuang C-Y (Chinese Taipei) Cheng I-C	5	8	3	4

==== Section 2 ====
First Round
15	(Belarus) E Chtchetinine (Belarus) V Pavlovich	11	9	11	11	12
Q	(Italy) N Stoyanov (Italy) L Ridolfi	9	11	6	8	10
Q	(Moldova) I Ni (Moldova) O Bliznet	8	13	7	8
43	(Serbia) M Jevtović (Serbia) A Erdelji	11	15	11	11
54	(Romania) O Ionescu (Romania) B Szocs	12	12	11	11
(Netherlands) B Wijers (Netherlands) Y Timna	10	10	3	5
Q	(Australia) D Powell (Australia) T Z Vivian	4	8	2	4
26	(Czech Republic) P Korbel (Czech Republic) R Strbikova	11	11	11	11
21	(Romania) A Crişan (Romania) D Dodean	11	9	11	8	11	11
(Switzerland) N Mohler (Switzerland) M Fuhrer	0	11	5	11	9	6
Q	(England) D Reed (England) H Hicks	2	9	8	9
47	(Germany) R Filus (Germany) K Muhlbach	11	11	11	11
37	(Russia) A Shibaev (Russia) A Voronova	11	15	11	11
Q	(Venezuela) J Pino (Venezuela) L Perez	8	13	8	7
(Thailand) N Wongsiri (Thailand) A Muangsuk	5	8	12	5	3
6	(Japan) Kenta Matsudaira (Japan) K Ishikawa	11	11	10	11	11

Second Round
15	(Belarus) E Chtchetinine (Belarus) V Pavlovich	8	11	14	11	11	11
43	(Serbia) M Jevtović (Serbia) A Erdelji	11	13	12	6	6	9
54	(Romania) O Ionescu (Romania) B Szocs	12	11	11	13
26	(Czech Republic) P Korbel (Czech Republic) R Strbikova	10	6	8	11
21	(Romania) A Crişan (Romania) D Dodean	11	11	11	9	6	11
47	(Germany) R Filus (Germany) K Muhlbach	9	8	6	11	11	7
37	(Russia) A Shibaev (Russia) A Voronova	3	6	11	10	8
6	(Japan) Kenta Matsudaira (Japan) K Ishikawa	11	11	5	12	11

Third Round
15	(Belarus) E Chtchetinine (Belarus) V Pavlovich	11	12	11	12
54	(Romania) O Ionescu (Romania) B Szocs	9	10	6	10
21	(Romania) A Crişan (Romania) D Dodean	9	8	12	7	9
6	(Japan) Kenta Matsudaira (Japan) K Ishikawa	11	11	10	11	11

Fourth Round
15	(Belarus) E Chtchetinine (Belarus) V Pavlovich	8	11	11	11	6	11
6	(Japan) Kenta Matsudaira (Japan) K Ishikawa	11	6	7	5	11	6

==== Section 3 ====
First Round
7	(Singapore) Yang Z (Singapore) Wang Y	11	11	11	11
Q	(Mexico) S Uribe (Mexico) M Madrid	4	4	6	6
Q	(Venezuela) M Navas (Venezuela) R Ezzeddine	11	9	11	8	5	8
40	(Slovakia) T Keinath (Slovakia) B Balazova	8	11	8	11	11	11
44	(Spain) A Carneros (Spain) S Ramirez	11	11	11	12
(Colombia) A Echavarria (Colombia) P Medina	3	8	3	10
(Israel) S Rabinovich (Israel) M Kravchenko	12	6	11	6	7
27	(Russia) F Kuzmin (Russia) O Fadeeva	10	11	13	11	11
24	(Russia) I Rubtsov (Russia) A Tikhomirova	11	11	11	11
Q	(Dominican Republic) E Santos (Dominican Republic) J Valdez	7	4	9	6
Q	(Trinidad and Tobago) D St. Louis (Trinidad and Tobago) R Chung	8	7	8	7
45	(Poland) J Kosowski (Poland) K Grzybowska	11	11	11	11
38	(Sweden) M Karlsson (Sweden) M Ekholm	11	11	5	11	14
(Estonia) A Smirnov (Estonia) T Tsistjakova	7	9	11	12	4
Q	(Cyprus) M Yiangou (Cyprus) L Kourea	3	6	5	7
12	(South Korea) Lee J-W (South Korea) Lee E-H	11	11	11	11

Second Round
7	(Singapore) Yang Z (Singapore) Wang Y	11	11	12	11
40	(Slovakia) T Keinath (Slovakia) B Balazova	5	5	10	7
44	(Spain) A Carneros (Spain) S Ramirez	8	11	6	5	13
27	(Russia) F Kuzmin (Russia) O Fadeeva	11	8	11	11	15
24	(Russia) I Rubtsov (Russia) A Tikhomirova	9	9	11	7	8
45	(Poland) J Kosowski (Poland) K Grzybowska	11	11	6	11	11
38	(Sweden) M Karlsson (Sweden) M Ekholm	8	11	11	8	9	10
12	(South Korea) Lee J-W (South Korea) Lee E-H	11	9	9	11	11	12

Third Round
7	(Singapore) Yang Z (Singapore) Wang Y	6	11	6	11	11	11
27	(Russia) F Kuzmin (Russia) O Fadeeva	11	7	11	6	7	8
45	(Poland) J Kosowski (Poland) K Grzybowska	4	8	1	5
12	(South Korea) Lee J-W (South Korea) Lee E-H	11	11	11	11

Fourth Round
7	(Singapore) Yang Z (Singapore) Wang Y	4	11	11	9	13	6	11
12	(South Korea) Lee J-W (South Korea) Lee E-H	11	4	8	11	11	11	5

==== Section 4 ====
First Round
9	(Singapore) Gao N (Singapore) Li J	11	11	11	11
(Egypt) E-S Lashin (Egypt) S Hassan	8	8	3	8
Q	(Italy) L Mutti (Italy) D Vivarelli	4	8	10	11	11	11	11
48	(Turkey) P Jiang (Turkey) M Hu	11	11	12	4	9	9	13
34	(Poland) Z Y Wang (Poland) N Partyka	13	11	11	11
(Turkey) G Menge (Turkey) F Ozler	11	9	7	2
Q	(Macau) Chang H W (Macau) Ma C I	4	5	7	9
31	(Czech Republic) T Konecny (Czech Republic) I Vacenovska	11	11	11	11
25	(Hungary) J Jakab (Hungary) G Póta	5	11	9	14	11	11
Q	(Chile) A Rodríguez (Chile) P Vega	11	8	11	12	6	4
Q	(Finland) B Olah (Finland) A Kiritchenko	11	4	6	7	4
46	(Spain) J Cantero (Spain) G Dvorak	9	11	11	11	11
60	(Brazil) G Tsuboi (Brazil) J Yamada	6	7	11	3	4
(Portugal) E Mendes (Portugal) A Neves	11	11	9	11	11
(Serbia) B Crepulja (Serbia) A Todorović	7	3	9	9
4	(Japan) S Kishikawa (Japan) A Fukuhara	11	11	11	11

Second Round
9	(Singapore) Gao N (Singapore) Li J	5	5	8	11	11	11	11
48	(Turkey) P Jiang (Turkey) M Hu	11	11	11	7	5	6	3
34	(Poland) Z Y Wang (Poland) N Partyka	11	11	11	11
31	(Czech Republic) T Konecny (Czech Republic) I Vacenovska	8	9	8	5
25	(Hungary) J Jakab (Hungary) G Póta	7	11	11	11	11
46	(Spain) J Cantero (Spain) G Dvorak	11	7	7	6	8
(Portugal) E Mendes (Portugal) A Neves	5	9	4	8
4	(Japan) S Kishikawa (Japan) A Fukuhara	11	11	11	11

Third Round
9	(Singapore) Gao N (Singapore) Li J	10	11	14	11	11
34	(Poland) Z Y Wang (Poland) N Partyka	12	7	12	4	6
25	(Hungary) J Jakab (Hungary) G Póta	6	5	13	4	8
4	(Japan) S Kishikawa (Japan) A Fukuhara	11	11	11	11	11

Fourth Round
9	(Singapore) Gao N (Singapore) Li J	9	4	1	1
4	(Japan) S Kishikawa (Japan) A Fukuhara	11	11	11	11

=== Bottom half ===
==== Section 5 ====
First Round
3	(Hong Kong) Cheung Y (Hong Kong) Jiang H	11	11	11	11
Q	(United States) M Landers (United States) E Wu	7	7	4	2
(Thailand) C Chaitat (Thailand) N Komwong	8	11	12	10	10	11	9
50	(England) P Drinkhall (England) J Parker	11	5	10	12	12	7	11
49	(Czech Republic) P Sirucek (Czech Republic) D Hadačová	14	11	11	12
(Egypt) A Saleh (Egypt) S El-Sokary	12	4	6	10
(Republic of the Congo) S Idowu (Republic of the Congo) X Han	7	6	6	3
28	(Japan) Kenji Matsudaira (Japan) M Wakamiya	11	11	11	11
23	(Chinese Taipei) Huang S-S (Chinese Taipei) Huang Y-H	11	11	11	11
(Bulgaria) T Yordanov (Bulgaria) K Gatinska	7	4	5	3
Q	(Norway) E Berner (Norway) M Aasebo	6	8	3	8
58	(England) D Knight (England) K Sibley	11	11	11	11
52	(Chinese Taipei) Chen C-A (Chinese Taipei) Liu H-Y	11	11	11	11
Q	(Luxembourg) G Michely (Luxembourg) S de Nutte	6	8	7	9
Q	(Latvia) V Agurjanovs (Latvia) V Zabalujeva	1	2	5	5
14	(Turkey) Bora Vang (Turkey) Sirin He	11	11	11	11

Second Round
3	(Hong Kong) Cheung Y (Hong Kong) Jiang H	11	11	11	11
50	(England) P Drinkhall (England) J Parker	5	4	8	6
49	(Czech Republic) P Sirucek (Czech Republic) D Hadačová	7	8	11	5
28	(Japan) Kenji Matsudaira (Japan) M Wakamiya	11	11	13	11
23	(Chinese Taipei) Huang S-S (Chinese Taipei) Huang Y-H	11	11	11	11
58	(England) D Knight (England) K Sibley	7	5	6	9
52	(Chinese Taipei) Chen C-A (Chinese Taipei) Liu H-Y	9	4	4	6
14	(Turkey) Bora Vang (Turkey) Sirin He	11	11	11	11

Third Round
3	(Hong Kong) Cheung Y (Hong Kong) Jiang H	6	7	6	12	11	11	11
28	(Japan) Kenji Matsudaira (Japan) M Wakamiya	11	11	11	10	8	5	9
23	(Chinese Taipei) Huang S-S (Chinese Taipei) Huang Y-H	14	11	11	7	13
14	(Turkey) Bora Vang (Turkey) Sirin He	12	8	4	11	11

Fourth Round
3	(Hong Kong) Cheung Y (Hong Kong) Jiang H	11	11	11	8	11
23	(Chinese Taipei) Huang S-S (Chinese Taipei) Huang Y-H	3	5	3	11	6

==== Section 6 ====
First Round
11	(South Korea) Kim M-S (South Korea) Yang H-E	11	11	10	4	11	11
(Greece) A Riniotis (Greece) M Christoforaki	5	3	12	11	6	3
Q	(North Korea) Jang S-M (North Korea) Ri M-G	11	15	11	11
41	(Hungary) D Kosiba (Hungary) P Lovas	5	13	7	4
57	(Belarus) P Platonov (Belarus) A Privalova	w/o
(Nigeria) S Toriola (Nigeria) J Effiom
Q	(Guatemala) J Ramírez (Guatemala) A Estrada	5	6	6	5
22	(Hong Kong) Jiang T (Hong Kong) Lee H C	11	11	11	11
29	(North Korea) Kim H-B (North Korea) Kim Jong	11	11	11	8	11
(Bulgaria) S Golovanov (Bulgaria) S Remzi	4	9	8	11	5
(Ukraine) Y Pryshchepa (Ukraine) I Motsyk	w/o
35	(Croatia) A Gacina (Croatia) C Molnar
56	(France) Q Robinot (France) A Dessaint	8	11	9	11	11	8	11
(Bosnia and Herzegovina) A Duranspahic (Bosnia and Herzegovina) E Hadziahmetovic	11	7	11	4	6	11	5
(Portugal) A Silva (Portugal) M Xiao	11	7	6	11	5
5	(Hong Kong) Tang P (Hong Kong) Tie Y N	13	11	11	9	11

Second Round
11	(South Korea) Kim M-S (South Korea) Yang H-E	11	11	12	11
Q	(North Korea) Jang S-M (North Korea) Ri M-G	4	8	10	9
57	(Belarus) P Platonov (Belarus) A Privalova	6	2	6	4
22	(Hong Kong) Jiang T (Hong Kong) Lee H C	11	11	11	11
29	(North Korea) Kim H-B (North Korea) Kim Jong	11	11	11	7	11
(Ukraine) Y Pryshchepa (Ukraine) I Motsyk	5	5	8	11	9
56	(France) Q Robinot (France) A Dessaint	5	4	4	11	6
5	(Hong Kong) Tang P (Hong Kong) Tie Y N	11	11	11	9	11

Third Round
11	(South Korea) Kim M-S (South Korea) Yang H-E	8	5	8	8
22	(Hong Kong) Jiang T (Hong Kong) Lee H C	11	11	11	11
29	(North Korea) Kim H-B (North Korea) Kim Jong	11	11	10	11	11
5	(Hong Kong) Tang P (Hong Kong) Tie Y N	6	7	12	7	6

Fourth Round
22	(Hong Kong) Jiang T (Hong Kong) Lee H C	11	13	11	9	9	7
29	(North Korea) Kim H-B (North Korea) Kim Jong	7	15	9	11	11	11

==== Section 7 ====
First Round
8	(China) Yan A (China) Feng Y	9	11	11	11	9	11
(Poland) R Floras (Poland) A Szymanska	11	9	8	8	11	5
(Republic of the Congo) S Saka (Republic of the Congo) F Yang	11	7	11	11	7	7	11
63	(India) A Anthony (India) M Patkar	5	11	9	8	11	11	9
42	(North Korea) Ri C-G (North Korea) Kim H-S	11	11	11	14
(Venezuela) H Mujica (Venezuela) F Ramos	3	3	5	12
(India) S Roy (India) P Ghatak	11	3	6	9	5
30	(Germany) Z Fejer-Konnerth (Germany) Z Barthel	9	11	11	11	11
32	(Dominican Republic) J Lin (Dominican Republic) X Wu	11	11	11	11
Q	(Pakistan) A Qureshi (Pakistan) S Bilal	6	7	1	4
Q	(Netherlands) K Hageraats (Netherlands) B Eerland	4	11	10	11	16	6	6
61	(Egypt) O Assar (Egypt) D Meshref	11	7	12	3	14	11	11
59	(Ukraine) I Katkov (Ukraine) G Gaponova	9	11	11	7	12	11
Q	(Lithuania) M Skučas (Lithuania) R Paškauskienė	11	9	5	11	10	8
(Slovenia) G Zafostnik (Slovenia) J Tomazini	9	5	4	5
13	(South Korea) Seo H-D (South Korea) Seok H-J	11	11	11	11

Second Round
8	(China) Yan A (China) Feng Y	11	11	11	11
(Republic of the Congo) S Saka (Republic of the Congo) F Yang	6	6	9	5
42	(North Korea) Ri C-G (North Korea) Kim H-S	8	11	7	11	7	8
30	(Germany) Z Fejer-Konnerth (Germany) Z Barthel	11	4	11	9	11	11
32	(Dominican Republic) J Lin (Dominican Republic) X Wu	11	11	12	11
61	(Egypt) O Assar (Egypt) D Meshref	2	4	10	5
59	(Ukraine) I Katkov (Ukraine) G Gaponova	6	9	10	13	13
13	(South Korea) Seo H-D (South Korea) Seok H-J	11	11	12	11	15

Third Round
8	(China) Yan A (China) Feng Y	13	7	14	11	11
30	(Germany) Z Fejer-Konnerth (Germany) Z Barthel	11	11	12	5	4
32	(Dominican Republic) J Lin (Dominican Republic) X Wu	5	7	11	7	11	9
13	(South Korea) Seo H-D (South Korea) Seok H-J	11	11	7	11	6	11

Fourth Round
8	(China) Yan A (China) Feng Y	11	7	14	10	7	8
13	(South Korea) Seo H-D (South Korea) Seok H-J	7	11	12	12	11	11

==== Section 8 ====
First Round
16	(Romania) A Filimon (Romania) E Samara	11	11	11	11
Q	(Wales) S Jenkins (Wales) N Owen	3	3	3	7
(Slovenia) S Lasan (Slovenia) N Pavlin	11	8	11	11	8	12	3
64	(Malaysia) M S Ibrahim (Malaysia) Beh L W	7	11	13	9	11	10	11
51	(Singapore) Pang X J (Singapore) Yu M	11	13	11	12
(Slovakia) M Bardon (Slovakia) S Hudecova	6	11	7	10
(Canada) P-L Theriaul (Canada) M Zhang	DQ
19	(Serbia) Ž Pete (Serbia) G Feher
20	(Spain) C Machado (Spain) Y Shan	11	11	11	11
Q	(Macau) Leong K W (Macau) Cheong C	5	2	2	3
Q	(Malta) M Genovese (Malta) J Pace	2	3	4	3
39	(India) S Kamal (India) S Kumaresan	11	11	11	11
36	(Austria) S Fegerl (Austria) Q Li	w/o
(Nigeria) M Merotohun (Nigeria) O Edem
(Mexico) M Madrid (Mexico) Y Silva	9	11	1	10	3
2	(China) Zhang C (China) Cao Z	11	6	11	12	11

Second Round
16	(Romania) A Filimon (Romania) E Samara	11	11	10	11	11
64	(Malaysia) M S Ibrahim (Malaysia) Beh L W	4	9	12	6	7
51	(Singapore) Pang X J (Singapore) Yu M	13	10	11	11	8	11	11
19	(Serbia) Ž Pete (Serbia) G Feher	15	12	7	9	11	2	5
20	(Spain) C Machado (Spain) Y Shan	12	6	11	7	11	12
39	(India) S Kamal (India) S Kumaresan	10	11	8	11	8	10
36	(Austria) S Fegerl (Austria) Q Li	6	5	4	14	11	6
2	(China) Zhang C (China) Cao Z	11	11	11	12	5	11

Third Round
16	(Romania) A Filimon (Romania) E Samara	12	11	8	11	8	8	8
51	(Singapore) Pang X J (Singapore) Yu M	10	8	11	8	11	11	11
20	(Spain) C Machado (Spain) Y Shan	7	5	5	8
2	(China) Zhang C (China) Cao Z	11	11	11	11

Fourth Round
51	(Singapore) Pang X J (Singapore) Yu M	2	8	11	5	11	7
2	(China) Zhang C (China) Cao Z	11	11	9	11	6	11
