= 2012 Latin American Table Tennis Cup =

The 2012 Latin American Table Tennis Cup was held at the Eddy Cortez National Sports Centre in San José, Costa Rica from May 25–27, 2012 and was a qualifier for the 2012 Table Tennis World Cup. A prize pool of US$10,000 was at stake. The event was the second edition of the competition and was organized by the International Table Tennis Federation, the Latin American Table Tennis Union, and the Costa Rican Table Tennis Association. Brazilian Thiago Monteiro won the men's event; fellow Brazilian Caroline Kumahara won the women's competition.

== Seeds ==
Seeding was based on the ITTF World Ranking lists published on May 1, 2012.

- Men's Competition
1. Lin Ju (DOM) - Latin American Champion 2012
2. Cazuo Matsumoto (BRA) - South American Champion
3. Liu Song (ARG) - London 2012 Olympic Games Qualifier
4. Thiago Monteiro (BRA) - LATTU Ranking
5. Marcelo Aguirre (PAR) - London 2012 Olympic Games Qualifier
6. Hugo Hoyama (BRA) - London 2012 Olympic Games Qualifier
7. Gaston Alto (ARG) - LATTU Ranking
8. Jorge Campos (CUB) - LATTU Ranking
9. Dexter St. Louis (TRI) - LATTU Ranking
10. Pablo Tabachnik (ARG) - LATTU Ranking
11. Héctor Gatica (GUA) - Central American Champion
12. Allan Calvo (CRC) - Host Nation Representative
- Women's Competition
1. Ligia Silva (BRA) - London 2012 Olympic Games Qualifier
2. Paula Medina (COL) - London 2012 Olympic Games Qualifier
3. Yadira Silva (MEX) - London 2012 Olympic Games Qualifier
4. Caroline Kumahara (BRA) - London 2012 Olympic Games Qualifier
5. Jessica Yamada (BRA) - 2012 Latin American Champion
6. Fabiola Ramos (VEN) - London 2012 Olympic Games Qualifier
7. Berta Rodríguez (CHI) - London 2012 Olympic Games Qualifier
8. Paulina Vega (CHL) - South American Champion
9. Carelyn Cordero (PUR) - LATTU Ranking
10. Rheann Chung (TRI) - Caribbean Champion
11. Mabelyn Enriquez (GUA) - Central American Champion
12. Angie Araya (CRC) - Host representative

== Men's Competition ==
The twelve competitors were split into four groups of three, playing each groupmate once. The top two in each group advanced to the single-elimination bracket.

After the favorite and number one seed, Lin Ju, failed to advance beyond the group stage, the event was essentially up for grabs. In the semifinals, Thiago Monteiro defeated Gaston Alto and Liu Song beat Cazuo Matsumoto. Monteiro defeated Liu Song, 4–1, in the final to claim the title and qualify for the Liebherr World Cup. Both Matsumoto and Alto won bronze medals.

=== Qualification round ===
==== Group 1 ====
Rnk	Player	Pld	W	L	GW	GL	Pts
1	(Argentina) Gaston Alto	2	1	1	6	4	3
2	(Trinidad and Tobago) Dexter St. Louis	2	1	1	7	6	3
3	(Dominican Republic) Lin Ju	2	1	1	4	7	3

==== Group 2 ====
Rnk	Player	Pld	W	L	GW	GL	Pts
1	(Brazil) Cazuo Matsumoto	2	2	0	8	4	4
2	(Cuba) Jorge Campos	2	1	1	6	5	3
3	(Argentina) Pablo Tabachnik	2	0	2	3	8	2

==== Group 3 ====
Rnk	Player	Pld	W	L	GW	GL	Pts
1	(Argentina) Liu Song	2	2	0	8	0	4
2	(Brazil) Hugo Hoyama	2	1	1	4	5	3
3	(Costa Rica) Allan Calvo	2	0	2	1	8	2

==== Group 4 ====
Rnk	Player	Pld	W	L	GW	GL	Pts
1	(Brazil) Thiago Monteiro	2	2	0	8	4	4
2	(Paraguay) Marcelo Aguirre	2	1	1	6	4	3
3	(Guatemala) Héctor Gatica	2	0	2	2	8	2

=== Main Draw ===
Quarterfinals
7	(Argentina) Gaston Alto	11	11	10	11	11
6	(Brazil) Hugo Hoyama	14	7	12	5	8
8	(Cuba) Jorge Campos	5	8	5	8
4	(Brazil) Thiago Monteiro	11	11	11	11
3	(Argentina) Liu Song	11	11	11	11
5	(Paraguay) Marcelo Aguirre	9	9	4	7
9	(Trinidad and Tobago) Dexter St. Louis	9	6	11	4	11	1
2	(Brazil) Cazuo Matsumoto	11	11	8	11	8	11

Semifinals
7	(Argentina) Gaston Alto	4	6	12	9
4	(Brazil) Thiago Monteiro	11	11	14	11
3	(Argentina) Liu Song	11	11	11	12
2	(Brazil) Cazuo Matsumoto	9	9	9	10

Final
4	(Brazil) Thiago Monteiro	11	12	11	8	13
3	(Argentina) Liu Song	9	10	9	11	11

== Women's Competition ==
The women's competition was structured in the same way as the men's event.

Carelyn Cordero upset the number one seed in the quarterfinals in a seven-set thriller. After defeating Fabiola Ramos in the semifinals, Cordero fell to Caroline Kumahara in the championship.

=== Qualification round ===
==== Group 1 ====
Rnk	Player	Pld	W	L	GW	GL	Pts
1	(Brazil) Ligia Silva	2	2	0	8	2	4
2	(Trinidad and Tobago) Rheann Chung	2	1	1	6	7	3
3	(Chile) Paulina Vega	2	0	2	3	8	2

==== Group 2 ====
Rnk	Player	Pld	W	L	GW	GL	Pts
1	(Colombia) Paula Medina	2	2	0	8	5	4
2	(Puerto Rico) Carelyn Cordero	2	1	1	7	7	3
3	(Chile) Berta Rodríguez	2	0	2	5	8	2

==== Group 3 ====
Rnk	Player	Pld	W	L	GW	GL	Pts
1	(Mexico) Yadira Silva	2	2	0	8	4	4
2	(Brazil) Jessica Yamada	2	1	1	6	4	3
3	(Guatemala) Mabelyn Enriquez	2	0	2	2	8	2

==== Group 4 ====
Rnk	Player	Pld	W	L	GW	GL	Pts
1	(Brazil) Caroline Kumahara	2	2	0	8	1	4
2	(Venezuela) Fabiola Ramos	2	1	1	5	4	3
3	(Costa Rica) Angie Araya	2	0	2	0	8	2

=== Main Draw ===
Quarterfinals
1	(Brazil) Ligia Silva	11	11	4	11	11	8	8
9	(Puerto Rico) Carelyn Cordero	8	4	11	7	13	11	11
6	(Venezuela) Fabiola Ramos	11	11	5	11	11
3	(Mexico) Yadira Silva	6	5	11	6	8
4	(Brazil) Caroline Kumahara	11	11	9	11	11
10	(Trinidad and Tobago) Rheann Chung	4	8	11	4	4
5	(Brazil) Jessica Yamada	11	10	3	11	9
2	(Colombia) Paula Medina	7	12	11	13	11

Semifinals
9	(Puerto Rico) Carelyn Cordero	9	11	12	11	11
6	(Venezuela) Fabiola Ramos	11	8	10	9	8
4	(Brazil) Caroline Kumahara	12	8	7	11	11	11
2	(Colombia) Paula Medina	10	11	11	5	9	5

Final
9	(Puerto Rico) Carelyn Cordero	11	6	8	11	4	7
4	(Brazil) Caroline Kumahara	9	11	11	9	11	11

== See also ==
- Latin American Table Tennis Cup
