= Yadira Silva =

Mexican table tennis player (born 1985)

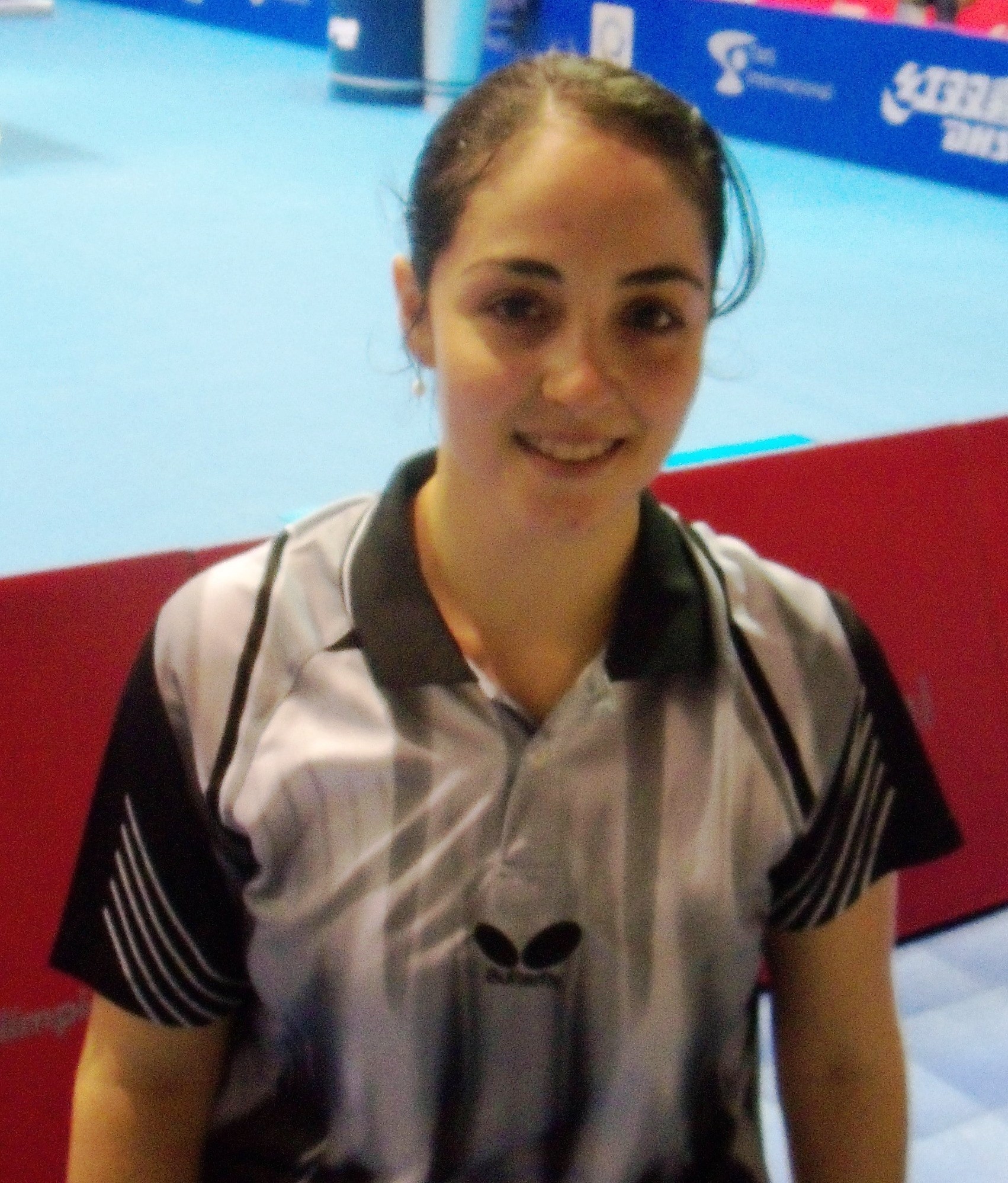
- Yadira Silva during the 2013 Latin American Table Tennis Cup

Personal information
- Full name: Yadira Silva Llorente
- Nationality: Mexican
- Born: 24 December 1985 (age 40) Unión de Reyes, Matanzas, Cuba
- Height: 159 cm (5 ft 3 in)
- Weight: 56 kg (123 lb)

Sport
- Sport: Table tennis
- Playing style: Offensive
- Equipment: Blade: Butterfly Timo Boll Spirit; Forehand Rubber: Butterfly Tenergy 64; Backhand Rubber: Butterfly Tenergy 64
- Highest ranking: 211
Medal record
Women's table tennis
Representing Cuba
Latin American Junior Championships
Gold medal – first place	2003 Santa Clara	Women's Doubles
Silver medal – second place	2003 Santa Clara	Singles
Silver medal – second place	2003 Santa Clara	Mixed Doubles
Representing Mexico
Central American and Caribbean Games
Gold medal – first place	2014 Veracruz	Singles
Silver medal – second place	2010 Mayaguez	Singles
Bronze medal – third place	2014 Veracruz	Team
Latin American Table Tennis Cup
Silver medal – second place	Rio de Janeiro 2011	Singles
Latin American Championships
Gold medal – first place	2010 Cancun	Singles
Gold medal – first place	2015 Buenos Aires	Mixed Doubles
Silver medal – second place	2010 Cancun	Mixed Doubles
Silver medal – second place	2015 Buenos Aires	Singles
Bronze medal – third place	2011 Guadalajara	Women's Doubles
Bronze medal – third place	2012 Rio de Janeiro	Singles

Yadira Silva Llorente (born 24 December 1985) is a Cuban-born Mexican table tennis player who participated in the 2008, 2012 Summer Olympics and 2016 Summer Olympics

After winning several medals in the 2002 Cuban National Games and 2003 Junior Latin American Championships playing as a Cuban, Silva married Mexican coach Roberto Madrigal Hernández and established herself in Mexico. With her new citizenship, she represented Mexico in the 2008 Olympic Qualification Tournament, qualifying for the 2008 Summer Olympics, where she was knocked out in the qualification round. She won the 2010 Latin American Championship and the silver medal in the 2010 Central American and Caribbean Games and 2011 Latin American Cup.

Silva played in the 2008, 2010 and 2012 World Team Championships, helping Mexico to reach the 56th, 59th and 66th place. In the 2011 World Championships she played the singles, women's and mixed doubles without reaching the main draw. In 2010 she won the Tabasco's State Sports Award. In the 2012 Summer Olympics she failed to progress beyond the qualification round.

== Early and personal life ==
Silva was born on 24 December 1985 in [La Habana del Este, Cuba. She is a youngest daughter from Jorge silva and Angelica llorente She is 159 cm (5 ft 3 in) tall and weighs 56 kilograms (123 lb). Silva started in table tennis at the age of 10 when her brother Dr. Maikel Silva Llorente took her to a table tennis club in Union de Reyes, Matanzas under Zoilo Isasi supervision, who was her first coach . The next year she started in the Sporting Initial School and by the age of 13, she joined the Cuban High Performance Center and won the Cancun Open in 2002 at the age of 16. After arriving in Mexico in 2004, she worked as a trainer and her students qualified for the National Games in 2006.

She obtained Mexican citizenship after marrying the Mexican Roberto Madrigal Hernández, who is also her coach. She has two daughters, Yadira and Angelica Madrigal Silva, and lives with her family in the Mexican city of Villahermosa, Tabasco. Silva considers herself a housewife who still prepares Cuban food, but has been taught Mexican cuisine by her mother-in-law. Silva has confessed that leaving her daughters is the toughest thing for her, even when her mother Angelica Llorente takes care of them. She considers her mom an example and appreciates the great deal of support she gives her.

== Equipment ==
As of 2012, Silva's equipment is Butterfly Timo Boll Spirit blade with Butterfly Tenergy 64 in both sides.

== Career for Cuba ==
=== 2002 ===
She took part of the 2002 Cuban National Games (I Olimpiada Nacional) representing centrales as a 17 years old, winning four gold medals: in singles, women's doubles, mixed doubles with Pavel Oxamendi and team. At that time she was said to be pretty, quiet and talented.

=== 2003 ===
In April, Silva took part of the Latin American Junior Championships held in Santa Clara, Cuba, winning the silver medal in singles, the gold in women's doubles and the silver in mixed doubles, qualifying for that year World Junior Championships.

Playing for Cuba, she earned her spot for the 2003 Pan American Games in Santo Domingo, Dominican Republic, by winning the gold medal at the special tournament.

Playing with Dayana Ferrer, they defeated Salvadorians Wang De Ying and Morayle Álvarez 4–1 (4–11, 6–11, 10–12, 12–10, 4–11), then lost 4–0 to Americans Tawny Banh and Lily Yip in the quarter-final round. In the singles event, and lost in the singles round of 16 to American Gao Jun, who later won the gold medal.

At the singles tournament of the Latin American Championships, she fell in the semifinals, and got 8th in doubles, playing with Dayana Ferrer.

== Career for Mexico ==
In 2004 she arrived in Mexico but did not play until the Cancun Open the next year. She also won two more local tournaments in Quintana Roo and Pachuca in 2006. But she was not able to play again until the 2008 Olympic Qualification Tournament when she received the clearance to represent her new country.

=== 2008 ===
At the World Team Championships held in February in Guangzhou, China, Silva played with Laura Rosales, Sarah Rosas and Daniela Sánchez. They lost 3–0 to Turkey in the first round, and Silva lost 3–0 to Melek Hu. Silva scored a 3–0 victory over Erdenesuvd Byambaa to complete a 3–0 victory over Mongolia. Uzbekistan defeated Mexico 3–2, but Silva won her two matches to Aliye Ismailova (3–2) and Rimma Gufranova (3–1). Silva defeated Lyanne Aponte, as her team defeated Puerto Rico 3–0. They finally beat Latvia 3–1 with Silva's two victories over Inta Laudupe (3–2) and Baiba Bogdasarova (3–0). After the defeat 0–3 from Bosnia and Herzegovina in the second stage for the 49–60 placement draw, Mexico faced Macau, who defeat them 0–3 with Silva's 3–2 victory over Ma Chao in and a 3–0 defeat from Wong Choi Chi. In the 53–56 placement they were defeated by Uzbekistan 3–0 with a Silva's 3–2 defeat from Aliye Ismailova. They finally lost 2–3 to Kazakhstan and finished in the 56th position in the World Championship; Silva lost 1–2 to Marina Shumakova and won 3–1 to Yelena Shagarova.

Silva won the right to compete at the 2008 Summer Olympics in the singles last chance from the Latin American Qualification Tournament held in Santo Domingo in April. The two previous days she could only reach the second round, but in the third she defeated the Cuban Glendys González to win her Olympic ticket. This made her the first ever Mexican representative in table tennis at the Summer Olympics, as well makes her known in her new country. Days later, she played the Latin American Championship's quarterfinal in the same venue and lost to Dominican Lian Qian in the singles quarterfinals. In the team competition, she defeated Ruaida Ezzeddine and Luisana Pérez to help her national team to qualify to the quarterfinals. With Silva leading Mexico with two more victories, they beat Brazil in the quarterfinals only to fall to the favorites Dominican Republic in the semifinals, with Silva being defeated in her only match by Wu Xue, accounting a tied bronze medal.

Before the Olympics, Silva trained under the guidance of her Chinese coach Yin Kin at the PKU Gym in China's province Sichuan during 45 days. Both she and her coach targeted to reach the round of 16 in the singles events. She was one of the 83 competitors representing Mexico and the second table tennis player ever, after Guillermo Muñoz participation at the 1996 Olympics. The Croatian Andrea Bakula finished Silva's participation at the singles event of the Beijing Olympics with a 4–0 (12–10, 11–8, 11–2, 11–8) victory in just 26 minutes in the preliminary round. During the game, she tried to attack her right side, but her lefty and more experienced opponent attacked her backhand. Silva also confessed that she should have risked more.

In November she played the Central American Championship held in San Salvador, El Salvador, winning the silver medal in the singles event falling 4–2 (9–11, 8–11, 11–6, 10–11, 11–7, 3–11), to Salvadorian Morayle Álvarez, silver in women's double partnering Aurora Pequeño, bronze in team competition also with Aurora, and gold in mixed doubles with Jude Okoh. She also won the Great CONCATEME Cup, played as the closing of the tournament by the best-ranked players, after beating Salvadorian Estefania Ramirios 4–0 (11–8, 11–1, 11–8, 13–11) to win the cup and the $300 prize money.

She gave birth in May 2009 and did not play until the 2010 Latin American Championships.

=== 2010 ===
At the 2010 Latin American Championship held in March in Cancun, Mexico, Silva won the singles gold medal after defeat Brazilian Lígia Silva, 4–1 (9–11, 11–9, 11–5, 10–12, 16–14) and the silver in mixed doubles, playing with Jude Okoh, after falling to the Brazilian duo of Cazuo Matsumoto and Ligia Silva. With the Latin American Championship, she secured a place in the World Cup. Her trainer Lin Qing led her in a training camp in China before the Latin American Championship.

In the 2010 World Team Table Tennis Championships held in May in Moscow, Russia, Silva played with Laura Rosales, Sarah Rosas and Nancy Sánchez; Mexico lost 1–3 in the first round from the Dominican Republic, with Silva being defeated 1–3 by Johenny Valdez. In the second, Mexico beat 3–1 to Norway, and she lost 0–3 from Marthe Nilsen and defeating Marte Aasebo 3–2. Bosnia and Herzegovina lost 2–3 from Mexico, and Silva won her two matches 3–0 against Majda Prole and Emina Hadžiahmetović. Mexico beat Peru in the fourth round 3–0 with María Soto being defeated by Silva 3–0. Finally Mexico also beat Sri Lanka 3–0 with Srimali Wimalarathne falling to Silva. They finished in the third place in the K group of the Third Division. In the second stage Mexico started the 49–60 placement round with a 0–3 lost to Switzerland, with Silva's lost 3–0 to Rahel Aschwanden. Mexico then lost to Macao 1–3, with Silva's win 3–0 to Cheong Cheng I and 1–3 defeat by Ma Chao In. Finally Mexico placed 59, after defeating 3–1 to the Dominican Republic, Silva won 3–2 to Eva Brito and 3–2 to Johenny Valdez.

After a training camp in China with other four member of the Mexico National Team, she participated in July at the 2010 Central American and Caribbean Games in Mayaguez, Puerto Rico. With Laura Rosales, she played only one game in the Women's Doubles, being defeated by the Venezuela pair of Cruz Aguilar and Luisana Perez 2–3. She helped with two victories against El Salvador at the quarterfinals in the Women's Team event, but her team los 2–3. She played with Jude Okoh the Mixed doubles being defeated in the second round by the Dominican couple Wu Xue and Lin Ju 0–3 (5–11, 10–12 y 9–11). reaching the final after defeating Venezuelan Fabiola Ramos 4–0, but after losing the gold medal match 4–1 (9–11, 11–7, 11–7, 11–6 y 11–7) to the Dominican Republic representative Wu Xue.

In September, she took part in the World Cup held in Kuala Lumpur, Malaysia, as the Latin American representative. She had to play in the Intercontinental Cup to receive a berth to the group stage. Besides her loss to Yang Fen from Congo Brazzaville that prevent her to win the Cup and play the main draw, she defeated New Zealander Karen Li and Canadian Zhang Mo.

In November Silva received the Tabasco's State Sports Award (Spanish: Premio Estatal del Deporte) along with chess player Leopoldo Aguirre Manzo and seven-year-old golfer Ariel González Arceo. She previously stated that she would felt proud of winning the award.

=== 2011 ===
For starting the year, she ranked 237 in the ITTF rankings.

She played in March the Latin American Cup in Rio de Janeiro, Brazil and in the Group stage she beat 4–1 both Brazilians Katia Kawai and Caroline Kumahara securing a spot in the quarterfinals. She beat Guatemalan Andrea Estrada 4–0 in the quarterfinals, and Brazilian Jessica Yamada (4–3) in the semifinal before being defeated by the Dominican Wu Xue 4–0 (11–9, 11–7, 11–3, 11–9) in the final game, receiving the silver medal.

In April she played the Spanish Open in Almeria, Spain and lost her three matches against South Korean Hyelin Lee 1–4, Danish Mie Skov 0–4, and Polish Antonina Szymanska 2–4 in the women's singles qualification groups. In the Doubles she partnered Guatemalan Andrea Estrada, they lost to Sarah de Nutte and Tessy Gonderinger from Luxemburg.

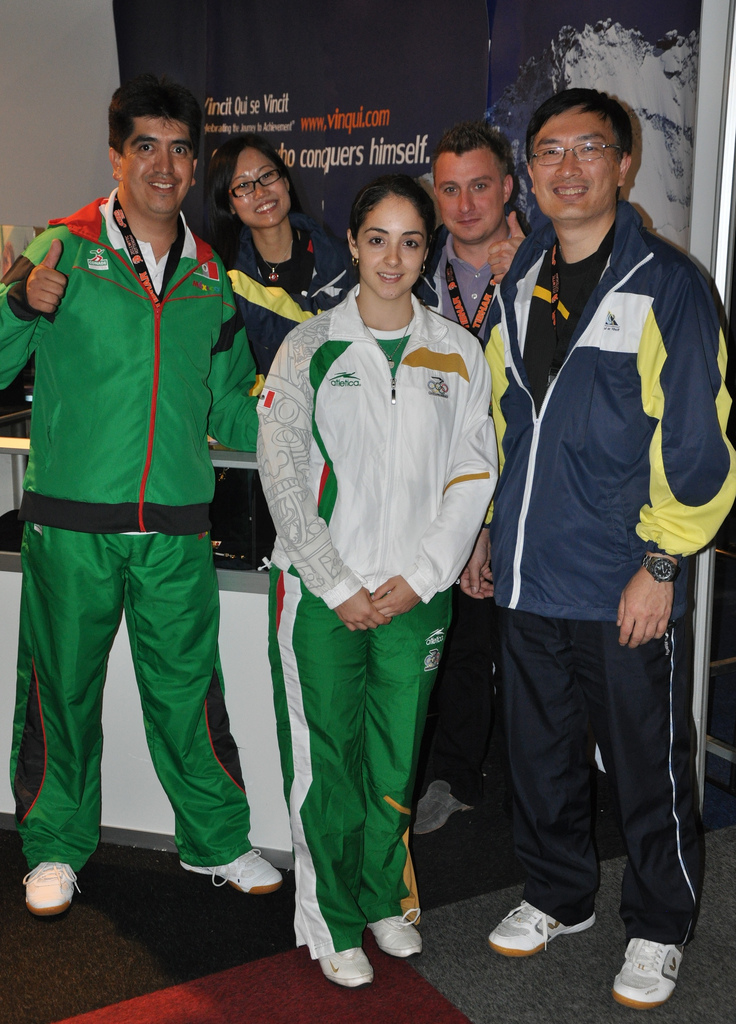
Silva during the 2011 World Championships

In the GAC Group World Table Tennis Championships played on 8–15 May in Rotterdam, Netherlands, she played in the singles qualifications groups and lost to Chinese Taipei representative Liu Hsing-Yin 0–4 and later win 4–0 to Macanese Cheong Cheng I, not qualifying to the main draw. She have to play the consolation round, defeating Dominican Johenny Valdez 3–1 in the round of 64, Dutch Suzanne Dieker 3–1 in the round of 32, Venezuelan Ruaida Ezzeddine 3–1 in the round of 16, finally falling to Indian Mamata Prabhu 0–3 in the quarterfinals. In the qualifying rounds of the women's doubles Silva played with Laura Rosales, and they defeated 3–0 Latvians Diana Rusinova and Alexsandra Volosina. They then lost 0–3 to Moldovans Olga Bliznet and Alina Sandul, not qualifying for the Main Draw. In the Mixed doubles, she played with Marcos Madrid falling 4–1 (9–11, 11–6, 1–11, 10–12, 3–11) in their first match the seeded #2, defending champions and later gold medalists Zhang Chao and Cao Zhen.

At the Latin American Championship held in Guadalajara, Mexico Silva fall in the quarterfinal round of the singles competition bye the Chilean Paulina Vega but win the bronze medal in the women's doubles playing with Mercedes Madrid. In the team competition her team lost to Cuba in the quarterfinals, even when Silva defeated to the Cubans Leisy Jimenez and Glendys Gonzalez, but her partners lost the remaining matches.

At the 2011 Pan American Games Silva played in the singles qualifying to the quarterfinals after winning her stage group, beating the Brazilian Caroline Kumahara, Canadian Shirley Fu and Puerto Rican Daniely Ríos. She then lost to the Canadian Zhang Mo in the quarterfinals. In the team competition her team ended her participation in the group stage.

=== 2012 ===
At the 2012 Latin America Qualification Tournament held in March at Rio de Janeiro, Brazil she earned the right to represent her country at the 2012 Summer Olympics. She qualified after defeating in the las qualifier the Salvadorian Karla Pérez, Puerto Rican Carelyn Cordero, Brazilian Caroline Kumahara and the rematch to the Dominican Qian Lian, who beat her in the first qualifier. After the qualification, she claimed to be proud for being playing for Mexico, because that was the country that let her make her dream of competing at the Olympics, come true. After the qualification Sergio Blanco, president of the Mexican Table Tennis Federation, praised her for helping in the development of the table tennis in Mexico. He said that Silva's qualification motivate players and help for the federation budget as an Olympic one. She later played the Latin American Championship in the same venue, winning 3–1 over Venezuelan Roxy Gonzalez in the round of 16, 3–0 to Colombian Johana Araque in the quarterfinals, and lost 3–2 to Brazilian Jessica Yamada in the semifinals to win a bronze medal, along with Paula Medina. In the team competition, Mexico defeated Venezuela 3–2 in the first round in the group stage, with Silva defeating 3–1 to Gremlis Arvelo and 3–0 to Roxy González; in the second round Argentina defeated 3–2 to Mexico, even when Silva won 3–0 to Agustina Iwasa and 3–1 to Ana Codina. In the second stage her team lost 3–0 to Dominican Republic in the quarterfinals.

Playing in late March in the World Team Championships in Dortmund, Germany she joined teammates Mercedes Madrid and Mónica Serrano, and coach Carlos Ballesteros. They started with a 3–1 victory over Mongolia in the first round, with Silva defeating Ankh-Erdene Altanbagana and Batkhishig Batsaikhan, both 3–0. In the second round Mexico lost 2–3 to Ireland with two more victories scored by Silva over Ashley Givan and Amanda Mogey. Iran defeated Mexico 3–2 in the third round with Mahjobeh Omrani and Neda Shahsavari being defeated by Silva. In the fourth round they lost to Canada 3–1; Silva defeated Sara Yuen 3–2 but lost 0–3 to Chris Xu. Both Luiza Nazaryan and Hasmik Khachatryan representing Armenia lost 3–0 to Silva when they defeated Mexico 3–2, and they finished 5th in their group. In the 61–72 placement bracket, Mexico faced Macedonia, defeating them 3–1 with two more victories from Silva to Biljana Mladenova and Amelia Uce. Silva then defeated Mabelyn Enriquez but lost to Andrea Estrada from Guatemala that defeated Mexico 3–1. In the third round they defeated Sri Lanka 3–1 with Erandi Warusawithana and Ishara Madurangi being defeated 3–0 by Silva. Mexico ended in the 66th position after losing 3–2 to Argentina, with Silva's two final victories over Maia Harima and Ana Codina.

In April she reached her best ever ranking, rising from 251 to 211 after her World Championship participation. At the 2012 ITTF Spanish Open held in Almeria, Spain, she lost to the Irish Na Liu 4–0 and Japanese Misaki Morizono 4–1 in the singles qualifications groups and played in doubles with the Spaniard Marina Rodriguez and lost to Singaporeans Li Jiawei and Sun Beibei.

At the Latin American Cup 2012 held in May at San José, Costa Rica, Silva won her group stage with victories over Jessica Yamada and Mabelyn Enriquez, but losing to Fabiola Ramos 1–4 (11–6, 11–5, 5–11, 11–6, 11–8) in the quarterfinals 4–1.

In June she played the ITTF World Tour Swedish Open, in Helsingborg, Sweden; she lost 4–2 in her first match, against German Anja Schuh, ending her participation. She then moved to Santos, Brazil to play the Brazil Open, she lost in the group stage of the singles tournament 4–0 in her first match, against Indian Shamini Kumaresan, beat Brazilian Karina Hayama 4–1 and Lais Toma 4–0, moving to the main draw. There she lost 4–0 to the South Korean Dang Ye-Seo in the round of 32. She played in the women's doubles with Colombian Paula Medina and defeated Lígia Silva and Jessica Yamada 3–2 (4–11, 5–11, 13–11, 11–9, 11–5), but lost to Japanese Yuki Nonaka and Polish Kinga Stefańska in the quarterfinals.

Ranked 233 in the world by the International Table Tennis Federation, she trained for three weeks in China with the National Coach, her husband Roberto Madrigal. She competed at the Olympic table tennis tournament and lost to the 16-year-old American Ariel Hsing in the first round 4–0 (11–9, 11–8, 11–3, 11–5). She later would recognize that she lost due to mistakes she made during the match.
