= Table tennis at the 2008 Summer Olympics – Qualification =

An NOC may enter up to 3 men and 3 women athletes in singles events and up to 1 men's and 1 women's team in teams events.

== Summary ==
Nation	Men		Women		Total
Nation	Individual	Team	Individual	Team	Total
Algeria	1				1
Argentina	2				2
Australia	3	X	3	X	6
Austria	3	X	2	X	6
Belarus	1		3		4
Belgium	1				1
Brazil	2	X	1		4
Cameroon			1		1
Canada	2	X	2		5
China	3	X	3	X	6
Chinese Taipei	2	X	2		5
Colombia			1		1
Republic of the Congo	1		1		2
Croatia	2	X	3	X	6
Czech Republic	1		1		2
Denmark	1				1
Dominican Republic	1		2	X	4
Egypt	3		2		5
France	3		1		4
Germany	3	X	2	X	6
Greece	2	X			3
Hong Kong	3	X	3	X	6
Hungary	1		3		4
India	1		1		2
Iran	1				1
Italy	1		2		3
Japan	3	X	3	X	6
Jordan			1		1
Kazakhstan			1		1
Kuwait	1				1
Lithuania			1		1
Luxembourg			1		1
Mexico			1		1
Netherlands			2	X	3
Nigeria	2	X	2	X	6
North Korea	3		2		5
Paraguay	1				1
Poland	1		2	X	4
Portugal	3				3
Romania	1		2	X	4
Russia	2	X	3		6
Serbia	1				1
Singapore	2	X	3	X	6
Slovakia			1		1
Slovenia	1				1
South Korea	3	X	3	X	6
Spain	2		2	X	5
Sweden	2	X			3
Thailand			1		1
Trinidad and Tobago	1				1
Turkey	1		1		2
Ukraine	1		2		3
United States	1		3	X	4
Vanuatu			1		1
Venezuela			1		1
Vietnam	1				1
Total: 56 NOCs	77	16	78	16	172

== Singles ==
=== Men ===
A total of 64 athletes will qualify for each singles event as follows:

Event	Date	Location	Qualifiers
ITTF World Ranking	January 3, 2008	-	(China) Wang Hao (China) Ma Lin (Germany) Timo Boll (Belarus) Vladimir Samsonov (South Korea) Ryu Seung-Min (South Korea) Oh Sang-Eun (Singapore) Gao Ning (Hong Kong) Li Ching (Chinese Taipei) Chuang Chih-Yuan (Greece) Kalinikos Kreanga (Austria) Werner Schlager (Japan) Kan Yo (Germany) Dimitrij Ovtcharov (Russia) Alexei Smirnov (Singapore) Yang Zi (Hong Kong) Ko Lai Chak (Croatia) Zoran Primorac (Denmark) Michael Maze (Spain) He Zhi Wen (Sweden) Jörgen Persson
All Africa Games	July 11–23, 2007	(Algeria) Algiers	(Nigeria) Segun Toriola (Nigeria) Monday Merotohun (Egypt) El-Sayed Lashin (Republic of the Congo) Suraju Saka (Algeria) Idir Khourta (Egypt) Adel Massaad
Middle Asia Qualification Tournament	October 15–18, 2007	(Iran) Tehran	(Iran) Afshin Norouzi
South East Asia Qualification Tournament	February 2–3, 2008	Singapore	(Vietnam) Doan Kien Quoc
West Asia Qualification Tournament	February 6–8, 2008	(Jordan) Amman	(Kuwait) Ibrahem Al-Hasan
South Central Asia Qualification Tournament	March 6–9, 2008	Hong Kong	(India) Sharath Kamal
Asian Qualification Tournament	March 6–9, 2008	Hong Kong	(China) Wang Liqin (North Korea) Kim Hyok Bong (North Korea) Ri Chol Guk (Japan) Jun Mizutani (South Korea) Yoon Jae-Young (Japan) Seiya Kishikawa (North Korea) Jang Song Man
Pan-American Games	July 21–27, 2007	(Brazil) Rio de Janeiro	(Dominican Republic) Lin Ju
Latin American Qualification Tournament *	Mar 30 - Apr 6, 2008	(Dominican Republic) Santo Domingo	(Argentina) Liu Song (Brazil) Gustavo Tsuboi (Brazil) Thiago Monteiro (Trinidad and Tobago) Dexter St Louis (Argentina) Pablo Tabachnik
North American Qualification Tournament	April 4–6, 2008	(Canada) Vancouver	(Canada) Zhang Peng (Canada) Pradeeban Peter-Paul (United States) David Zhuang
European Qualification Tournament	April 2–6, 2008	(France) Nantes	(Croatia) Tan Ruiwu (Sweden) Jens Lundqvist (Slovenia) Bojan Tokič (Austria) Robert Gardos (Germany) Christian Süß (Austria) Chen Weixing (Greece) Panagiotis Gionis (Portugal) João Monteiro (France) Patrick Chila (France) Christophe Legout (Russia) Fedor Kuzmin
Oceania Qualification Tournament	April 5–8, 2008	(New Caledonia) Noumea	(Australia) William Henzell (Australia) Kyle Davis (Australia) David Zalcberg
Final World Qualification Tournament	May 8–11, 2008	(Hungary) Budapest	(Hong Kong) Cheung Yuk (Chinese Taipei) Chiang Peng-Lung (Belgium) Jean-Michel Saive
Tripartite Commission Invitation	May 11, 2008	-	(Paraguay) Marcelo Aguirre
Additional**	May 8–11, 2008	(Hungary) Budapest	(Romania) Adrian Crisan (Egypt) Ahmed Ali Saleh (Turkey) Cem Zeng (France) Damien Eloi (Portugal) Marcos Freitas (Hungary) Janos Jakab (Serbia) Aleksandar Karakašević (Italy) Mihai Bobocica (Ukraine) Kou Lei (Czech Republic) Petr Korbel (Portugal) Tiago Apolonia (Spain) Alfredo Carneros (Poland) Lucjan Błaszczyk
TOTAL			77

=== Women ===
Event	Date	Location	Qualifiers
ITTF World Ranking	January 3, 2008	-	(China) Guo Yue (China) Zhang Yining (Singapore) Wang Yuegu (Singapore) Li Jiawei (Japan) Ai Fukuhara (South Korea) Kim Kyung-Ah (Germany) Wu Jiaduo (Japan) Sayaka Hirano (Austria) Liu Jia (Netherlands) Li Jiao (United States) Gao Jun (South Korea) Park Mi-Young (Croatia) Tamara Boroš (Poland) Li Qian (United States) Wang Chen (Hungary) Krisztina Tóth (Hong Kong) Lau Sui Fei (Romania) Daniela Dodean (Germany) Elke Schall (Luxembourg) Ni Xia Lian
All Africa Games	July 11–23, 2007	(Algeria) Algiers	(Republic of the Congo) Yang Fen (Nigeria) Bose Kaffo (Nigeria) Cecilia Offiong (Egypt) Shaimaa Abdul-Aziz (Egypt) Noha Yossry (Cameroon) Victorine Agum Fomum
Middle Asia Qualification Tournament	October 15–18, 2007	(Iran) Tehran	(Kazakhstan) Marina Shumakova
South East Asia Qualification Tournament	February 2–3, 2008	Singapore	(Singapore) Feng Tian Wei
West Asia Qualification Tournament	February 6–8, 2008	(Jordan) Amman	(Jordan) Zeina Shaban
South Central Asia Qualification Tournament	March 6–9, 2008	Hong Kong	(India) Neha Aggarwal
Asian Qualification Tournament	March 6–9, 2008	Hong Kong	(South Korea) Dang Ye-Seo (Thailand) Nanthana Komwong (China) Wang Nan (Japan) Haruna Fukuoka (North Korea) Kim Jong (North Korea) Kim Mi Yong (Chinese Taipei) Huang I-hua
Latin American Qualification Tournament	Mar 30 - Apr 6, 2008	(Dominican Republic) Santo Domingo	(Dominican Republic) Wu Xue (Venezuela) Fabiola Ramos (Brazil) Mariany Nonaka (Dominican Republic) Lian Qian (Colombia) Paula Medina (Mexico) Yadira Silva
North American Qualification Tournament	April 4–6, 2008	(Canada) Vancouver	(United States) Crystal Huang (Canada) Zhang Mo (Canada) Judy Long
European Qualification Tournament	April 2–6, 2008	(France) Nantes	(Netherlands) Li Jie (Belarus) Viktoria Pavlovich (Romania) Elizabeta Samara (Turkey) Melek Hu (France) Xian Yi Fang (Russia) Svetlana Ganina (Croatia) Sandra Paović (Poland) Xu Jie (Austria) Li Qiangbing (Spain) Zhu Fang (Italy) Tan Wenling Monfardini
Oceania Qualification Tournament	April 5–8, 2008	(New Caledonia) Noumea	(Australia) Lay Jian Fang (Australia) Stéphanie Sang Xu (Australia) Miao Miao
Final World Qualification Tournament	May 8–11, 2008	(Hungary) Budapest	(Hong Kong) Tie Yana (Hong Kong) Lin Ling (Spain) Shen Yanfei
Tripartite Commission Invitation	May 11, 2008	-	(Vanuatu) Priscila Tommy
Additional**	May 8–11, 2008	(Hungary) Budapest	(Hungary) Georgina Pota (Russia) Irina Kotikhina (Chinese Taipei) Pan Li-chun (Belarus) Tatyana Kostromina (Italy) Nikoleta Stefanova (Ukraine) Margaryta Pesotska (Croatia) Andrea Bakula (Russia) Oksana Fadeeva (Hungary) Petra Lovas (Belarus) Veronika Pavlovich (Slovakia) Eva Odorova (Czech Republic) Dana Hadacova (Lithuania) Ruta Paskauskiene (Ukraine) Tetyana Sorochinskaya
TOTAL			78

* 1 spot taken at the 2007 Pan-Americans Games.

** Unused quotas for team event.

== Teams ==
=== Qualification process ===
A total of 16 teams will qualify for each teams event as follows:

- 6 - top team from each continent
- 1 - Host Nation (CHN) direct entry (if not qualified as top team from Asia)
- 9 - remaining selected teams (or 10 if CHN qualifies as top team from Asia)

Each team will consist of 3 players and they don't have to participate in singles events (there are 22 additional athletes quota places for such players). Teams will be selected after all singles qualification events, and according to a special May 2008 team ranking list. Qualification will be awarded first to the highest ranked teams with three players qualified for the singles event. If the quota hasn't been filled, selection will proceed to teams with two players qualified for the singles event, then to teams with only one singles qualifier.

If the field of 16 teams is filled without using all of the 22 athletes quota places, any unused places will be added to the Final World Qualification Tournament to select additional singles players. In order to select the Teams only the 64 qualified players will be taken into consideration to establish the Special Olympic Computer Team Ranking (SOCTR). The SOCTR will be calculated in the same way as we calculate the current ITTF Computer Team Ranking now. The difference is that: Only the 64 players qualified will be considered to establish the SOCTR for the purpose of selecting the Teams.

- General notes:
  - Teams will appear on the board when they qualified two or more athletes. If it becomes apparent that some countries with only one single entry will qualify for the team event, then the appropriate nations will be added to the board.
  - Nations highlighted in green qualify for the team event. The letter under "qualify as" represent how the team qualified: H means as the host nation, C means as the best team of the continent (China can qualify as HC if they become the best Asian team), and W meaning one of the ten highest ranked team that has not qualified as the best team of its respective continent. R means the team has been selected as a reserve.

=== Men ===
Country	Qualified Athletes	Points	Qualified as
China	3	38406.75	HC
South Korea	3	36516.25	W
Germany	3	36385.75	C
Hong Kong	3	36049.25	W
Austria	3	35804.00	W
Japan	3	35689.25	W
North Korea	3	34599.25	-
Australia	3	33004.25	C
Singapore	2	24132.00	W
Chinese Taipei	2	24081.75	W
Croatia	2	23788.75	W
Greece	2	23769.25	W
Sweden	2	23721.00	W
Russia	2	23612.00	W
France	2	23539.50	-
Brazil	2	23031.50	C
Argentina	2	22784.50	-
Nigeria	2	22615.75	C
Canada	2	22542.00	C
Egypt	2	22154.50	-

=== Women ===
Country	Qualified Athletes	Points	Qualified as
China	3	38270.25	HC
Singapore	3	37103.50	W
Hong Kong	3	36212.00	W
South Korea	3	36194.75	W
Japan	3	36172.00	W
United States	3	35146.25	C
Australia	3	34140.75	C
Netherlands	2	23974.50	C
Germany	2	23924.25	W
Austria	2	23865.50	W
Croatia	2	23778.00	W
Poland	2	23630.75	W
Spain	2	23591.75	W
Romania	2	23589.50	W
North Korea	2	23383.75	-
Dominican Republic	2	23149.75	C
Canada	2	22521.00	-
Nigeria	2	21879.75	C
