= 2011 Latin American Table Tennis Cup =

The 2011 Latin American Table Tennis Cup was held at the Ginásio do Maracanãzinho in Rio de Janeiro, Brazil from March 17–19, 2011. The event was a qualifier for the 2011 Table Tennis World Cup. It was the first edition of the event, organized by the International Table Tennis Federation, Latin American Table Tennis Union, Brazilian Table Tennis Confederation, and TMS International. Brazilian Gustavo Tsuboi won the men's event and the women's was won by the Dominican Wu Xue.

== Seeds ==
Seeds were based on the ITTF World Ranking lists published in March 2011.

- Men's Competition
1. Lin Ju (DOM) - LATTU Ranking 1
2. Liu Song (ARG) - 2010 Latin American Champion
3. Gustavo Tsuboi (BRA) - South American Champion
4. Hugo Hoyama (BRA) - LATTU Ranking 2
5. Cazuo Matsumoto (BRA) - Host representative
6. Marcos Madrid (MEX) - LATTU Ranking 3
7. Marcelo Aguirre (PAR) - U-18 Latin American Champion
8. Gaston Alto (ARG) - LATTU Ranking 4
9. Josue Donado (ESA) - Central American Champion
10. Juan Vila Batista (DOM) - LATTU Ranking 5
11. Eric Mancini (BRA) - LATTU Ranking 6
12. Manuel Moya (CHI) - LATTU Junior wild card
- Women's Competition
1. Wu Xue (DOM) - LATTU Ranking 1
2. Ligia Silva (BRA) - LATTU Ranking 2
3. Paula Medina (COL) - South American Champion
4. Yadira Silva (MEX) - 2010 Latin American Champion
5. Caroline Kumahara (BRA) - U-18 Latin American Champion
6. Berta Rodríguez (CHI) - LATTU Ranking 3
7. Jessica Yamada (BRA) - Host representative
8. Mariany Nonaka (BRA) - LATTU Ranking 4
9. Carelyn Cordero (PUR) - LATTU Junior wild card
10. Katia Kawai (BRA) - LATTU Ranking 5
11. Andrea Estrada (GUA) - Central American Champion
12. Priscila Dias (BRA) - LATTU Ranking 6

== Men's competition ==
In the semi-finals, Brazil's Gustavo Tsuboi defeated Liu Song 4-3, and Paraguay's Marcelo Aguirre won over Cazuo Matsumoto 4-1. In the final, Aguirre lost to Tsuboi. Tsuboi's win qualified him for the 2011 Liebherr Men's World Cup.

=== Qualification round ===
==== Group 1 ====
Player	Pld	W	L	GW	GL	Pts
(Dominican Republic) Lin Ju	2	2	0	8	1	4
(Brazil) Eric Mancini	2	1	1	4	4	3
(Mexico) Marcos Madrid	2	0	2	1	8	2

==== Group 2 ====
Player	Pld	W	L	GW	GL	Pts
(Brazil) Cazuo Matsumoto	2	2	0	8	5	4
(Argentina) Liu Song	2	1	1	6	4	3
(Chile) Manuel Moya	2	0	2	3	8	2

==== Group 3 ====
Player	Pld	W	L	GW	GL	Pts
(Paraguay) Marcelo Aguirre	2	2	0	8	2	4
(Brazil) Gustavo Tsuboi	2	1	1	5	5	3
(El Salvador) Josue Donado	2	0	2	2	8	2

==== Group 4 ====
Player	Pld	W	L	GW	GL	Pts
(Brazil) Hugo Hoyama	2	2	0	8	3	4
(Argentina) Gaston Alto	2	1	1	5	5	3
(Dominican Republic) Juan Vila Batista	2	0	2	3	8	2

=== Main Draw Bracket ===
Quarterfinals
1	(Dominican Republic) Lin Ju	6	12	10	11	11	6	8
2	(Argentina) Liu Song	11	10	12	8	8	11	11
3	(Brazil) Gustavo Tsuboi	11	11	11	11
4	(Brazil) Hugo Hoyama	3	7	5	5
7	(Paraguay) Marcelo Aguirre	5	9	11	12	11	11
11	(Brazil) Eric Mancini	11	11	6	10	9	6
8	(Argentina) Gaston Alto	11	5	10	8	5
5	(Brazil) Cazuo Matsumoto	8	11	12	11	11

Semifinals
2	(Argentina) Liu Song	4	9	9	11	11	13	8
3	(Brazil) Gustavo Tsuboi	11	11	11	4	5	11	11
7	(Paraguay) Marcelo Aguirre	11	11	4	11	11
5	(Brazil) Cazuo Matsumoto	8	4	11	9	8

Final
3	(Brazil) Gustavo Tsuboi	11	11	11	11
7	(Paraguay) Marcelo Aguirre	5	7	5	6

== Women's competition ==
In the semi-finals, Dominican Wu Xue defeated Paula Medina 4-2, and Mexican Yadira Silva beat Jessica Yamada 4-3. Wu won the women's competition after defeating Silva, qualifying for the 2011 Volkswagen Women's World Cup and winning the US $2,000 prize.

=== Qualification round ===
==== Group 1 ====
Player	Pld	W	L	GW	GL	Pts
(Dominican Republic) Wu Xue	2	2	0	8	1	4
(Brazil) Jessica Yamada	2	1	1	4	4	3
(Puerto Rico) Carelyn Cordero	2	0	2	1	8	2

==== Group 2 ====
Player	Pld	W	L	GW	GL	Pts
(Brazil) Ligia Silva	2	2	0	8	1	4
(Chile) Berta Rodríguez	2	1	1	5	4	3
(Brazil) Priscila Dias	2	0	2	0	8	2

==== Group 3 ====
Player	Pld	W	L	GW	GL	Pts
(Colombia) Paula Medina	2	2	0	8	0	4
(Guatemala) Andrea Estrada	2	1	1	4	6	3
(Brazil) Mariany Nonaka	2	0	2	2	8	2

==== Group 4 ====
Player	Pld	W	L	GW	GL	Pts
(Mexico) Yadira Silva	2	2	0	8	2	4
(Brazil) Caroline Kumahara	2	1	1	5	5	3
(Brazil) Katia Kawai	2	0	2	2	8	2

=== Main Draw Bracket ===
Quarterfinals
1	(Dominican Republic) Wu Xue	11	11	11	11
5	(Brazil) Caroline Kumahara	7	3	6	5
6	(Chile) Berta Rodríguez	11	6	8	7	5
3	(Colombia) Paula Medina	7	11	11	11	11
4	(Mexico) Yadira Silva	11	12	11	11
11	(Guatemala) Andrea Estrada	9	10	8	6
7	(Brazil) Jessica Yamada	11	11	11	9	11	6	11
2	(Brazil) Ligia Silva	13	6	7	11	9	11	8

Semifinals
1	(Dominican Republic) Wu Xue	8	11	5	11	11	12
3	(Colombia) Paula Medina	11	8	11	5	7	10
4	(Mexico) Yadira Silva	7	11	6	11	6	11	11
7	(Brazil) Jessica Yamada	11	9	11	9	11	5	0

Final
1	(Dominican Republic) Wu Xue	11	11	11	11
4	(Mexico) Yadira Silva	9	7	3	9

== See also ==
- Latin American Table Tennis Cup
