= Latin American Table Tennis Cup =

The Latin American Table Tennis Cup is an annual table tennis competition being held since 2011. It consists of Men's and Women's Singles events. Only 12 invited players and no more than 3 players per association are allowed to participate in each event. Starting from 2013, it is recognised as the qualification event for the Table Tennis World Cup. The competitions are organized by the Latin American Table Tennis Union and sanctioned by International Table Tennis Federation (ITTF) and classified as R3 in rating weightings, B4 in bonus weightings in the ITTF world ranking.

== Winners ==
=== Men's singles ===
Year	Host City	Gold	Silver	Bronze	Ref.
2011	Rio de Janeiro	(Brazil) Gustavo Tsuboi	(Paraguay) Marcelo Aguirre	(Argentina) Liu Song (Brazil) Cazuo Matsumoto	
2012	San José	(Brazil) Thiago Monteiro	(Argentina) Liu Song	(Argentina) Gastón Alto (Brazil) Cazuo Matsumoto	
2013	Santo Domingo	(Brazil) Thiago Monteiro	(Dominican Republic) Lin Ju	(Brazil) Gustavo Tsuboi	
2014	Asunción	(Brazil) Cazuo Matsumoto	(Mexico) Marcos Madrid	(Brazil) Gustavo Tsuboi	
2015	Havana	(Brazil) Gustavo Tsuboi	(Brazil) Cazuo Matsumoto	(Ecuador) Alberto Miño	
2016	Guatemala City	(Brazil) Hugo Calderano	(Mexico) Marcos Madrid	(Brazil) Eric Jouti (Ecuador) Alberto Miño	

=== Women's singles ===
Year	Host City	Gold	Silver	Bronze	Ref.
2011	Rio de Janeiro	(Dominican Republic) Wu Xue	(Mexico) Yadira Silva	(Colombia) Paula Medina (Brazil) Jessica Yamada	
2012	San José	(Brazil) Caroline Kumahara	(Puerto Rico) Carelyn Cordero	(Colombia) Paula Medina (Venezuela) Fabiola Ramos	
2013	Santo Domingo	(Dominican Republic) Wu Xue	(Mexico) Yadira Silva	(Brazil) Caroline Kumahara	
2014	Asunción	(Brazil) Caroline Kumahara	(Brazil) Lígia Silva	(Venezuela) Gremlis Arvelo	
2015	Havana	(Brazil) Caroline Kumahara	(Brazil) Gui Lin	(Brazil) Lígia Silva	
2016	Guatemala City	(Colombia) Lady Ruano	(Mexico) Yadira Silva	(Venezuela) Gremlis Arvelo (Chile) Paulina Vega	
