= Table tennis at the 2006 Central American and Caribbean Games =

- Location: Cartagena
- Dates: 22–30 July

The Table tennis competition at the 2006 Central American and Caribbean Games was held in Cartagena, Colombia. The tournament was held from 22 to 30 July.

== Medal summary ==
=== Men's events ===
Event	Gold	Silver	Bronze
Singles	Lin Ju (DOM)	Dexter St. Louis (TRI)	Dimey Góngora (CUB); José Ramírez (GUA)
Doubles	Cuba (Dimey Góngora, Andy Pereira)	Dominican Republic (Lin Ju, Roberto Brito)	Colombia (Jonathan Salazar, Carlos Alvarado); Colombia (Ricardo Rodríguez, Alexander Echavarría)
Team	Cuba (Dimey Góngora, Andy Pereira, Pavel Oxamendi, Boris Roque)	Mexico (Carlos Chiu, Marcos Madrid, Daniel González, Guillermo Muñoz)	Colombia (Carlos Alvarado, Alexander Echavarría, Jonathan Salazar, Ricardo Rodríguez); Venezuela (Elis Rondón, Henry Mujica, Marcos Navas, Luis Díaz)

=== Women's events ===
Event	Gold	Silver	Bronze
Singles	Wu Xue (DOM)	Lian Qian (DOM)	Iizzwa Medina (HON); Fabiola Ramos (VEN)
Doubles	Dominican Republic (Wu Xue, Lian Qian)	Venezuela (Ruaida Ezzedine, Fabiola Ramos)	El Salvador (Wang De Ying, Wang De Hsuan); Honduras (Iizzwa Medina, Zzwitjhallim Medina)
Team	Dominican Republic (Wu Xue, Lian Qian, Lucia Marte, Johenny Valdez)	Cuba (Anisleyvi Bereau, Dayana Ferrer, Glendys González, Heylyn Trujillo)	Colombia (Natalia Bedoya, María Caballero, Brihana Díaz, Paula Medina); Venezuela (Ruaida Ezzedine, Mariana Guánchez, Fabiola Ramos, María Ramos)

=== Mixed events ===
Event	Gold	Silver	Bronze
Doubles	Dominican Republic (Lin Ju / Wu Xue)	Cuba (Anisveyvi Bereau / Pavel Oxamendi)	Trinidad and Tobago (Dexter St. Louis / Rhean Chung); Venezuela (Henry Mujica / Fabiola Ramos)
