= Table tennis at the 2010 Central American and Caribbean Games =

- Location: (Puerto Rico) Mayagüez
- Dates: 22-30 July

The Table tennis competition at the 2010 Central American and Caribbean Games was held in Mayagüez, Puerto Rico. The tournament was scheduled to be held from 22 to 30 July.

== Medal summary ==
=== Men's events ===
Event	Gold	Silver	Bronze
Singles	Marcos Madrid (MEX)	Lin Ju (DOM)	Alexander Echavarria (COL); Jonathan Pino (VEN)
Doubles	Dominican Republic (Lin Ju, Juan Vila)	Dominican Republic (Samuel Gálvez, Emil Santos)	Mexico (Marcos Madrid, Salvador Uribe); Mexico (Guillermo Muñoz, Jude Okoh)
Team	Dominican Republic (Lin Ju, Emil Santos, Juan Vila, Samuel Gálvez)	Venezuela (Jonathan Pino, Henry Mujica, Marcos Navas, Luis Díaz)	Guatemala (Omar Flores, Héctor Gatica, Kevin Montufa, Jose Ramírez) Puerto Rico (Héctor Berrios, Ricardo Criado, Daniel González, Elvin Rivera)

=== Women's events ===
Event	Gold	Silver	Bronze
Singles	Wu Xue (DOM)	Yadira Silva (MEX)	Iizzwa Medina (HON); Fabiola Ramos (VEN)
Doubles	Venezuela (Ruaida Ezzedine, Fabiola Ramos)	Dominican Republic (Johenny Valdez, Wu Xue)	El Salvador (Morayle Alvarez, Estefania Ramirios); Colombia (Natalia Bedoya, Paula Medina)
Team	Colombia (Johana Araque, Natalia Bedoya, Paula Medina)	Venezuela (Luisana Perez, Ruaida Ezzedine, Fabiola Ramos)	El Salvador (Morayle Alvarez, Sandra Orellana, Karla Pérez, Estefania Ramirios); Dominican Republic (Eva Brito, Lucia Marte, Johenny Valdez, Wu Xue)

=== Mixed events ===
Event	Gold	Silver	Bronze
Doubles	Dominican Republic (Lin Ju / Wu Xue)	Mexico (Marcos Madrid / Sarah Rosas)	Venezuela (Luis Díaz / Luisana Pérez); Venezuela (Henry Mujica / Fabiola Ramos)
