= David Fernández =

David Fernández may refer to:

- David Fernández (table tennis), table tennis player from Puerto Rico
- David Fernández Borbalán (born 1973), Spanish football referee
- David Fernández (footballer, born 1976), Spanish retired footballer
- David Fernández (cyclist) (born 1977), Spanish cyclist
- David Fernández (footballer, born 1985), Spanish footballer
- David Fernández (judoka) (born 1973), Costa Rican judoka
- David Fernández Ortiz (born 1970), plays Spanish comedic character Rodolfo Chikilicuatre
- David Fernández Revoredo (1954–1996), pilot of Aeroperú Flight 603

== See also ==
- David Fernandes, Portuguese sprint canoer
- David Fernandes, fictional boxer in the 2015 Indian film Brothers, portrayed by Akshay Kumar
