= Table tennis at the 2014 Central American and Caribbean Games =

- Venue: Omega Complex
- Location: Veracruz, Mexico
- Dates: 15–20 November

The table tennis competition at the 2014 Central American and Caribbean Games was held in Veracruz, Mexico.

The tournament was scheduled to be held from 15 to 20 November at the Omega Complex.

== Medal summary ==
=== Men's events ===
Event	Gold	Silver	Bronze
Singles	Andy Pereira (CUB)	Brian Afanador (PUR)	Marcos Madrid (MEX); Daniel Gonzalez (PUR)
Doubles	Mexico (MEX); Marcos Madrid; Salvador Uribe	Puerto Rico (PUR); Brian Afanador; Daniel Gonzalez	Guatemala (GUA); Hector Gatica; Jose Miguel Ramirez; Trinidad and Tobago (TRI); Curtis Humphreys; Dexter St. Louis
Team	Puerto Rico (PUR); Brian Afanador; Hector Berrios; Daniel Gonzalez; Richard Pietri	Cuba (CUB); Jorge Campos; Livan Martinez; Yohan Mora; Andy Pereira	Guatemala (GUA); Hector Gatica; Heber Moscoso; Jose Miguel Ramirez; Kevin Soto; Mexico (MEX); Marcos Madrid; Guillermo Munoz; Salvador Uribe; Ricardo Villa

=== Women's events ===
Event	Gold	Silver	Bronze
Singles	Yadira Silva (MEX)	Gremlis Arvelo (VEN)	Paula Medina (COL); Adriana Diaz (PUR)
Doubles	Colombia (COL); Paula Medina; Lady Ruano	Puerto Rico (PUR); Adriana Diaz; Melanie Diaz	Mexico (MEX); Mercedes Madrid; Yadira Silva; Venezuela (VEN); Gremlis Arvelo; Roxy Gonzalez
Team	Puerto Rico (PUR); Carelyn Cordero; Adriana Diaz; Melanie Diaz; Daniely Ríos	Colombia (COL); Natalia Bedoya; Paula Medina; Lady Ruano; Angie Umbacia	Cuba (CUB); Lisi Castillo; Anell Garcia; Leisy Jimenez; Idalys Lovet; Mexico (MEX); Dulce Machinena; Mercedes Madrid; Monica Serrano; Yadira Silva

=== Mixed events ===
Event	Gold	Silver	Bronze
Doubles	Puerto Rico (PUR); Brian Afanador; Adriana Diaz	Mexico (MEX); Marcos Madrid; Yadira Silva	Cuba (CUB); Andy Pereira; Leisy Jimenez; Puerto Rico (PUR); Daniel Gonzalez; Carelyn Cordero

== Medal table ==
* Host nation (Mexico)

Rank	Nation	Gold	Silver	Bronze	Total
1	Puerto Rico (PUR)	3	3	3	9
2	Mexico (MEX)*	2	1	4	7
3	Cuba (CUB)	1	1	2	4
4	Colombia (COL)	1	1	1	3
5	Venezuela (VEN)	0	1	1	2
6	Guatemala (GUA)	0	0	2	2
7	Trinidad and Tobago (TRI)	0	0	1	1
Totals (7 entries)		7	7	14	28
