= Table tennis at the 2002 Central American and Caribbean Games =

Table Tennis at the 2002 Central American and Caribbean Games
- Venue: Féria Internacional
- Location: San Salvador
- Dates: November 22–30

The Table tennis competition at the 2002 Central American and Caribbean Games was held in the Feria Internacional stadium in San Salvador, El Salvador, between November 22 to 30.

== Medal summary ==
=== Men's events ===
Event	Gold	Silver	Bronze
Singles	David Fernández (PUR)	Guillermo Muñoz (MEX)	José Ramírez (GUA); Omar Flores (GUA)
Doubles	Guatemala (Alejandro Oviedo, Omar Flores)	Jamaica (Nigel Webb, Michael Hyatt)	Mexico (Luis Valdez, Olmo Zavala); Barbados (Trevor Farley, Abbie Clarke)
Team	Venezuela (Antonio Giannini, Henry Mujica, Ricardo Lizardo, Jonathan Pino)	Dominican Republic (Marx Valerio, Roberto Brito, Francisco Muñoz, Francisco Méndez)	Guatemala (Alejandro Oviedo, Omar Flores, José Ramírez, Steven Aranki); Puerto Rico (Juan Revelles, David Fernández, Santiago Coste, Abner Colón)

=== Women's events ===
Event	Gold	Silver	Bronze
Singles	Fabiola Ramos (VEN)	Luisana Pérez (VEN)	Wang De Ying (ESA); Morayle Álvarez (ESA)
Doubles	Venezuela (Fabiola Ramos, Luisana Pérez)	El Salvador (Wang De Ying, Morayle Álvarez)	El Salvador (Wang De Hsuan, Sonia Ramírez); Puerto Rico (Glenda Reyes, Darilyn García)
Team	Venezuela (Fabiola Ramos, María Ramos, Luisana Pérez, María Mata)	El Salvador (Wang De Ying, Wang De Hsuan, Morayle Álvarez, Sonia Ramírez)	Colombia (Johana Araque, María Henao, Lady Ruano); Puerto Rico (Glenda Reyes, Darilyn García, Johanna García, Enerys García)

=== Mixed events ===
Event	Gold	Silver	Bronze
Doubles	Venezuela (Fabiola Ramos / Antonio Giannini)	Puerto Rico (Glenda Reyes / David Fernández)	Dominican Republic (Olga Vila / Roberto Brito); Barbados (Kibili Moseley / Robert Roberts)
