= Iizzwa Medina =

Honduran table tennis player

Iízzwa Medina
Personal information
- Full name: Iízzwa Iizzalledd Medina Bueso
- Nationality: Honduras
- Born: 20 July 1982 (age 44) Tegucigalpa, Honduras
- Height: 1.62 m (5 ft 4 in)
- Weight: 50 kg (110 lb)

Sport
- Sport: Table tennis
- Playing style: Right-handed, shakehand
Medal record
Women's table tennis
Representing Honduras
Central American and Caribbean Games
Bronze medal – third place	2006 Cartagena	Singles
Bronze medal – third place	2006 Cartagena	Doubles
Bronze medal – third place	2010 Mayaguez	Singles

Iízzwa Iizzalledd Medina Bueso (born July 20, 1982) is a retired Honduran table tennis player.

== Career ==
She represented Honduras at the 2004 Summer Olympics. She later captured three bronze medals, along with her sister Zzwitjhallim, in both singles and doubles tournaments at the Central American and Caribbean Games (2006 in Cartagena, Colombia and 2010 in Mayagüez, Puerto Rico). Medina is also right-handed and uses the shakehand grip.

Medina qualified for the women's singles at the 2004 Summer Olympics in Athens by receiving a berth from the Latin American Qualification Tournament in Valdivia, Chile. Building a historic milestone as the first table tennis player from Central America, Medina was appointed by the Honduran Olympic Committee (Spanish: Comité Olímpico Hondureño) to carry the nation's flag in the opening ceremony. Ranking as 342 in the world, Medina defeated Jordanian teenager Zeina Shaban in their first preliminary round match with a score of 4–0, but was disqualified when the officials ruled the rubber on her racket proved illegal. This was due to the fact that the racket, that she had used for ten years prior, was not on the approved ITTF list for racket coverings due to the manufacturer having withdrawn it prior to the Olympics.

Through her appeal, the tournament officials decided to allow Medina to recap her match against Shaban with a new racket. Backed by a vocal group of Jordanian supporters, Medina officially lost a cliff-hanging match against Shaban in the seventh and decisive set with a final score of 9–11.

Outside of table tennis, she studied law.

Olympic Games
Preceded by Alejandro Castellanos	Flag bearer for Honduras; Athens 2004	Succeeded by Miguel Ferrera
