= Latin American Youth Table Tennis Championships =

International table tennis competition

The Latin American Youth Table Tennis Championships currently includes two categories: cadets (under 15) and juniors (under 18).

Currently, the championships include boys' team, girls' team, boys' singles, girls' singles, boys' doubles, girls' doubles and mixed doubles events for juniors and cadets. There are also consolation events for players defeated in the qualifying stages and in the first round of the singles events.

The final ranking of the junior boys' and girls' team events determines the qualification for the same year's World Junior Championships.

== Junior Results ==
Year	City	Team		Single		Double		
Year	City	Boys	Girls	Boys	Girls	Boys	Girls	Mixed
2015	Aguada	Argentina	Brazil	(Puerto Rico) Brian Afanador	(Brazil) Leticia Nakada	(Puerto Rico) Brian Afanador (Puerto Rico) Yomar Gonzalez	(Brazil) Leticia Nakada (Brazil) Alexia Nakashima	(Brazil) Vitor Santos (Brazil) Alexia Nakashima
2014	Medelin	Brazil	Brazil	(Argentina) Fermin Tenti	(Venezuela) Gremlis Arvelo	(Argentina) Fermin Tenti (Argentina) Horacio Cifuentes	(Puerto Rico) Melanie Diaz (Puerto Rico) Daniely Rios	(Venezuela) Pablo Navarro (Venezuela) Gremlis Arvelo
2013	Lima	Brazil	Brazil	(Puerto Rico) Brian Afanador	(Brazil) Caroline Kumahara	(Brazil) Vitor Ishiy (Brazil) Massao Kohatsu	(Brazil) Bruna Alexandre (Brazil) Caroline Kumahara	(Brazil) Vitor Ishiy (Brazil) Caroline Kumahara
2012	Puebla	Brazil	Puerto Rico	(Brazil) Vitor Ishiy	(Venezuela) Gremlis Arvelo	(Brazil) Hugo Calderano (Brazil) Eric Jouti	(Puerto Rico) Carelyn Cordero (Puerto Rico) Daniely Rios	(Argentina) Juan Daher (Argentina) Agustina Iwasa
2011	Lima	Brazil	Puerto Rico	(Brazil) Eric Jouti	(Puerto Rico) Carelyn Cordero	(Puerto Rico) Daniel González (Puerto Rico) Richard Pietri	(Brazil) Priscila Dias (Brazil) Katia Kawai	(Brazil) Jeff Yamada (Brazil) Katia Kawai
2010	Buenos Aires	Brazil	Brazil	(Paraguay) Marcelo Aguirre	(Brazil) Caroline Kumahara	(Paraguay) Marcelo Aguirre (Paraguay) Axel Gavilan	(Brazil) Kátia Kawai (Brazil) Caroline Kumahara	(Chile) Felipe Olivares (Chile) Judith Morales
2009	Guatemala City	Chile	Peru	(Cuba) Jorge Campos	(Puerto Rico) Lyanne Aponte	(Chile) Matias Contreras (Chile) Felipe Olivares	(Venezuela) Jennypher Orellana (Venezuela) Herlys Revilla	(Argentina) Rodrigo Gilabert (Argentina) Ana Codina
2008	Cartagena	Brazil	Brazil	(Colombia) Juan Restrepo	(Brazil) Karin Fukushima	(Dominican Republic) Juan Vila (Dominican Republic) Emil Santos	(Chile) Blanca Duran (Chile) Karen Rojas	(El Salvador) Josue Donado (El Salvador) Estefania Ramirios
2007	Cuenca	Brazil	Brazil	(Dominican Republic) Juan Vila	(Colombia) Paula Medina	(Brazil) Eric Mancini (Brazil) Humberto Manhani	(Colombia) Paula Medina (Colombia) Luisa Zuluaga	(El Salvador) Josue Donado (El Salvador) Estefania Ramirios

== Cadet Results ==
Year	City	Team		Single		Double		
Year	City	Boys	Girls	Boys	Girls	Boys	Girls	Mixed
2015	Aguada	Brazil	Puerto Rico	(Brazil) Guilherme Teodoro	(Brazil) Bruna Takahashi	(Brazil) Rafael Torino (Brazil) Guilherme Teodoro	(Puerto Rico) Adriana Diaz (Puerto Rico) Lineres Rivera	(Puerto Rico) Francisco Matias (Puerto Rico) Adriana Diaz
2014	Medelin	Brazil	Puerto Rico	(Argentina) Francisco Sanchi	(Puerto Rico) Adriana Diaz	(Peru) Marzio Chu (Peru) Juan Liyau	(Puerto Rico) Adriana Diaz (Puerto Rico) Lineres Rivera	(Puerto Rico) Sebastian Echevarria (Puerto Rico) Adriana Diaz
2013	Lima	Brazil	Brazil	(Ecuador) Emiliano Riofrio	(Brazil) Leticia Nakada	(Argentina) Horacio Cifuentes (Argentina) Francisco Sanchi	(Puerto Rico) Adriana Diaz (Puerto Rico) Lineres Rivera	(Brazil) Gustavo Yokota (Brazil) Bruna Takahashi
2012	Puebla	Argentina	Puerto Rico	(Puerto Rico) Brian Afanador	(Puerto Rico) Adriana Diaz	(Argentina) Fermin Tenti (Argentina) Horacio Cifuentes	(Venezuela) Neridee Nino (Venezuela) Josmary Lucena	(Puerto Rico) Brian Afanador (Puerto Rico) Adriana Diaz
2011	Lima	Brazil	Peru	(Brazil) Hugo Calderano	(Puerto Rico) Daniely Ríos	(Argentina) Fermin Tenti (Argentina) Diego Teplitzky	(Peru) Franchesca Vargas (Peru) Maria Ortiz	(Brazil) Hugo Calderano (Brazil) Genifer Zao
2010	Buenos Aires	Brazil	Peru	(Brazil) Hugo Calderano	(Dominican Republic) Eva Brito	(Brazil) Hugo Calderano (Brazil) Vitor Ishiy	(Venezuela) Gremlis Arvelo (Venezuela) Winberly Montero	(Venezuela) Frangher Coronel (Venezuela) Gremlis Arvelo
2009	Guatemala City	Argentina	Brazil	(Argentina) Pablo Saragovi	(Brazil) Caroline Kumahara	(Argentina) Juan Daher (Argentina) Pablo Saragovi	(Peru) Maria Soto (Peru) Valentina Lertora	(Brazil) Eric Jouti (Brazil) Caroline Kumahara
2008	Cartagena	Paraguay	Peru	(Brazil) Eric Jouti	(Peru) Angela Mori	(Paraguay) Santiago Osorio (Paraguay) Axel Avilan	(Ecuador) Astrid Salazar (Ecuador) Daniela Andrade	(Chile) Manuel Moya (Chile) Judith Morales
2007	Cuenca	Paraguay	Paraguay	(Argentina) Ariel Teplitzky	(Paraguay) Sandy Gavilan	(Chile) Matias Contreras (Chile) Felipe Olivares	(Paraguay) Sandy Gavilan (Paraguay) Lucero Ovelar	(Paraguay) Marcelo Aguirre (Paraguay) Sandy Gavilan

== See also ==
- Table tennis
- Latin American Table Tennis Union
- World Table Tennis Championships
- List of table tennis players
