= Northern American Table Tennis Union =

- Sport: Table tennis
- Jurisdiction: Northern America
- Abbreviation: NATTU
- Affiliation: ITTF
- Closure date: 2021

The Northern American Table Tennis Union (NATTU) was one of the table tennis continental federations recognised by International Table Tennis Federation (ITTF) before 2021. The NATTU was composed of member associations from The Bahamas, Bermuda, Canada, the United States, and US Virgin Islands.

In 2019, the NATTU and the Latin American Table Tennis Union (ULTM) founded the Pan American Table Tennis Confederation. The Confederation was recognised by the ITTF as the continental federation, replacing both the NATTU and the ULTM in 2021.
