= Antonio Giannini =

Venezuelan table tennis player

Personal information
- Full name: Antonio Giannini
- Nationality: Venezuela
- Born: VEN

Sport
- Sport: Table tennis
Medal record
Men's table tennis
Representing Venezuela
Central American and Caribbean Games
Gold medal – first place	2002 San Salvador	Team
Gold medal – first place	2002 San Salvador	Mixed Doubles

Antonio Giannini is a table tennis player from Venezuela, champion in the mixed doubles and team competition of the 2002 Central American and Caribbean Games. He played the 2005 World Championships, reaching the round of 128 in mixed doubles.

== Career ==
Giannini played with Fabiola Ramos at the 2002 Central American and Caribbean Games, winning the gold medal in mixed doubles. He also played the team competition with Henry Mujica, Ricardo Lizardo, Jonathan Pino, winning the championship of the event. He also took part of the 2004 Latin American Championship, claiming the bronze medal in the mixed doubles with Fabiola Ramos, and ranking among the 9-16th position in singles and 7th in team competition with Henry Mujica and Jonathan Pino.

In the 2005 World Championships, he played the mixed doubles with Fabiola Ramos, defeating Italian Andrea Tarocco and Lao's Soulinda Sisavath 3-0 in the round of 64, 3-2 to Rachid El Boubou and Lara Kejebachian from Libia, 3-1 to Philippines's Ernesto Ebuen and Sendrina Balatbat, but fell to Hong Kong's Li Ching and Lau Sui-fei 0-4 in the main draw round of 128.

In November 2012 he won the silver medal with Ricardo Lizardo, Jepherson Roach y Miguel Arcones in the team competition of the Latin American Master Championship.
