= Evgueni Chtchetinine =

Belarusian table tennis player (born 1970)

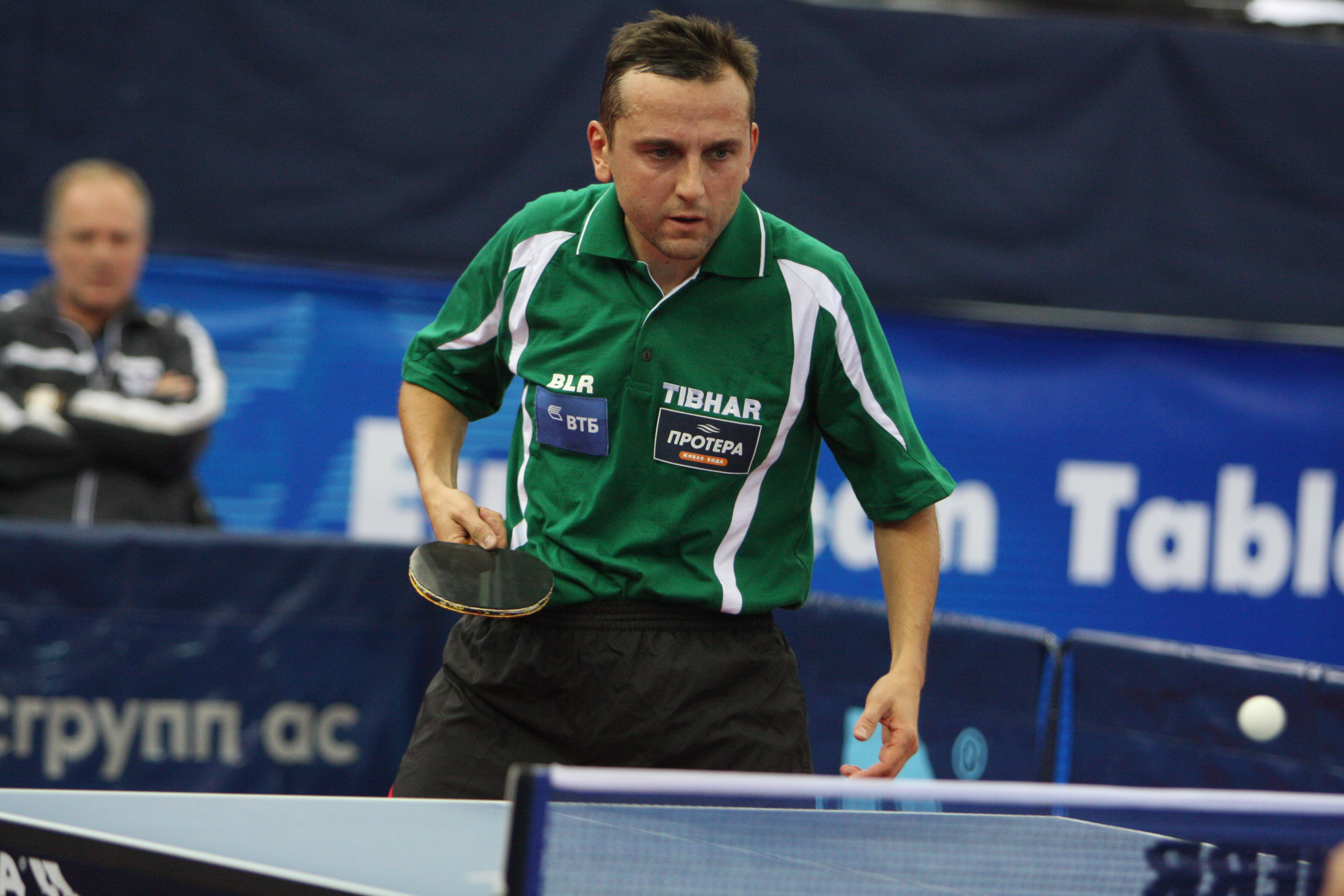

Personal information
- Native name: Яўген Шчацінін
- Full name: Evgueni Chtchetinine
- Nationality: Belarus
- Born: 1 February 1970 (age 56) Minsk, Belarus

Sport
- Sport: Table tennis
- Playing style: Defense
- Highest ranking: 47

Evgueni Chtchetinine or Yaŭgen Shchatsinin (born 1 February 1970) is a professional table tennis player from Minsk, Belarus. In 2003, he won the European Championship in men's double and team categories. He also competed at the 1996 Summer Olympics and the 2000 Summer Olympics.
