= David Fernández (table tennis) =

Puerto Rican table tennis player

Personal information
- Full name: David Fernández
- Nationality: Puerto Rico
- Born: Puerto Rico

Sport
- Sport: Table tennis
Medal record
Men's table tennis
Representing Puerto Rico
Central American and Caribbean Games
Gold medal – first place	2002 San Salvador	Singles
Silver medal – second place	2002 San Salvador	Mixed Doubles
Bronze medal – third place	2002 San Salvador	Team

David Fernández is a table tennis player from Puerto Rico, champion in the singles event of the 2002 Central American and Caribbean Games, silver medallist in mixed doubles, playing with Glenda Reyes and bronze in team competition alongside Juan Revelles, Santiago Coste and Abner Colón.

In 2008 he defeated 4-2 Sydney Christophe in the semifinals of the Brooklyn Open table tennis tournament, before falling to Guyanese Paul David in the final.
