= Cazuo Matsumoto =

Brazilian table tennis player

Personal information
- Nationality: Brazil
- Born: August 2, 1985 (age 40) São Paulo, São Paulo

Sport
- Sport: Table tennis
- Highest ranking: 45 (1 April 2013)
Medal record
Men's table tennis
Representing Brazil
Latin American Championships
Gold medal – first place	2009 San Salvador	Singles
Gold medal – first place	2009 San Salvador	Doubles
Gold medal – first place	2009 San Salvador	Mixed Doubles
Gold medal – first place	2009 San Salvador	Team
Gold medal – first place	2010 Cancún	Doubles
Gold medal – first place	2010 Cancún	Mixed Doubles
Gold medal – first place	2010 Cancún	Team
Gold medal – first place	2011 Guadalajara	Mixed Doubles
Gold medal – first place	2011 Guadalajara	Team
Gold medal – first place	2012 Rio	Team
Gold medal – first place	2013 San Salvador	Team
Gold medal – first place	2014 Santo Domingo	Team
Gold medal – first place	2015 Buenos Aires	Team
Latin American Table Tennis Cup
Gold medal – first place	2014 Asunción	Singles
Silver medal – second place	2015 Havana	Singles
Bronze medal – third place	2011 Rio	Singles
Bronze medal – third place	2012 San José	Singles
South American Games
Gold medal – first place	2006 B.Aires	Team
Gold medal – first place	2014 Santiago	Doubles
Silver medal – second place	2006 B.Aires	Doubles
Silver medal – second place	2014 Santiago	Singles
Silver medal – second place	2014 Santiago	Team

Cazuo Matsumoto (born August 2, 1985) is a Brazilian table tennis player. He competed at the 2016 Summer Olympics as part of the Brazilian team in the men's team event.

== Career ==
Cazuo Matsumoto was ranked no.207 in the world in 2002. At 20 years old, in 2005, he was ranked no.213. He first entered the global top 100 in May 2012.

In 2007, he participated for the first time in the World Championship, in singles and doubles, being eliminated from the first round in both.

At the 2008 Olympic Games, he was an alternate athlete to participate in the team modality.

In 2009, Matsumoto became Latin American Championship champion in singles, defeating Hugo Hoyama in the final, in doubles playing alongside Hoyama, and in mixed doubles.

At the end of March 2013, Matsumoto obtained a historic victory over the Japanese Jun Mizutani, one of the ten best in the world, in the Team World Cup, where Brazil fell to Japan. In April 2013, Matsumoto, after becoming the first Latin American to win a tournament on the world circuit, rose to 45th in the world rankings, the highest position ever achieved by a table tennis player from the country at that time.

In July 2013, he was the No. 1 table tennis player in the Americas.

At the end of 2013, he qualified for the ITTF World Tour Grand Finals, which would be held between the 9th and 12 January 2014, in Dubai.

In 2014, Matsumoto won the Latin American Table Tennis Cup.

Matsumoto achieved a great result at the 2015 World Table Tennis Championships, where, playing alongside Thiago Monteiro, he reached the quarterfinals of the doubles tournament, only being eliminated by the Korean duo, who finished with bronze. With this, they repeated the feat of Dagoberto Midosi and Ivan Severo, who, in 1954, also reached this stage in the World Championship held in Wembley, England. In singles, he reached the 2nd round at the 2013 World Table Tennis Championships, and in mixed doubles, he reached the 2nd round at the 2011 World Table Tennis Championships and 2013 World Table Tennis Championships.

Cazuo Matsumoto represented Brazil at the Rio Games in 2016 and then chose to dedicate himself to coaching, at Itaim Keiko/JJ Yamada and at his own gym, Match Point, alongside his wife and fellow Olympic athlete Jessica Yamada. Away from national competitions, he returned in September 2021 to compete in some tournaments.
