= Marina Shumakova =

Kazakhstani table tennis player (born 1983)

Marina Shumakova (born 22 July 1983) is a table tennis player from Kazakhstan. She is one of Kazakhstan's top players.

She competed at the 2008 Summer Olympics, reaching the preliminary round of the singles competition.
