= Zhang Chao =

Chinese writer and publisher (1650-?)

- Born: 1650; She County, Anhui
- Died: Unknown
- Occupations: Litterateur, Novelist, Poet, Engraving calligrapher
- Writing career
- Pen name: San zai daoren (三再道人); Shanlai (山来); Xinzhai (心斋)
- Period: Qing dynasty
- Notable works: Shadows of Sweet Dreams, New Tales of Yu Chu

Zhang Chao
- Traditional Chinese: 張潮
- Simplified Chinese: 张潮
Transcriptions
Standard Mandarin
- Hanyu Pinyin: Zhāng Cháo

Zhang Chao (b. 1650) was a Chinese litteratus, publisher, and fiction writer from Anhui. He was born in 1650 during the Qing dynasty. Zhang had extensive knowledge in the field of Confucianism, Taoism and Buddhism. He liked chess, calligraphy, and painting and was skilled as a poet of various genres. He was also interested in flowers, birds, fishes and insects. His works are rich in imagination and associated with the features of the Qing dynasty. Shadows of Sweet Dreams and New Tales of Yu Chu are his representative works. He also wrote Huaying ci 花影詞 (Poems of Flower Shadows), Xinang cunjin 奚囊寸錦, and Yin zhong baxian ling 飲中八仙令.

== Life ==
Zhang Chao was born in 1650 in She County, Anhui. One year before he was born, his father Zhang Xikong became a jinshi and went to work in Shandong as an educational inspector. After only a few months, Zhang Xikong's mother died and he resigned his position to go home as a merchant. Zhang Chao grew up in a wealthy family and his education was very strict. Under his father's influence, Zhang Chao studied diligently from his childhood. He devoted himself to the imperial examination for some time and he started to write eight-legged essays when he was 13 years old. Between the ages of 12 and 26, he failed the imperial examinations four times, in 1663, 1666, 1669 and 1672 during the reign of the Kangxi Emperor. He worked as a bureaucrat in the early Kangxi era, but his rank was low and he became disillusioned.

Disappointed with his career, he traveled to many places and lived in Rugao and Yangzhou for long periods. He made a lot of friends who were famous scholars or litterateurs at that time, such as Yu Huai, Kong Shangren, Mei Wending, and Shitao. When he finished Shadows of Sweet Dreams, almost a hundred of his friends made comments about his book.

In 1699, he fell victim to a conspiracy and he was sent to prison.

In 1707, he compiled Xinang cunjin. From that point, there is no further information on him and no reliable research in terms of the date of his death. He was familiar with writer Dai Mingshi, and spoke highly of him. In 1711, Dai Mingshi was sent to prison, where he was killed, an affair that entangled many others. If Zhang Chao was still alive, he would certainly have been involved in that case, so it is inferred that he was no longer alive by 1711.

== Major works ==
=== Shadows of Sweet Dreams ===
In 1936, Zhang Yiping, a litterateur, managed to purchase a manuscript of Shadows of Sweet Dreams, which was read by Lin Yutang, who thought highly of it. Lin Yutang translated it into vernacular Chinese and English. Lin Yutang classified the content into six parts: human life, personal character, women and friends, nature, the house and home, reading and literature. The book reflected Zhang Chao's sympathies with the Ming dynasty, and in style was highly reminiscent of Ming-era literature.

=== New Tales of Yu Chu ===
This is a collection of early Qing dynasty's stories compiled by Zhang Chao, containing 20 chapters. Yu Chu was the name of an alchemist in the Han dynasty, who was called the earliest ancestor of novelists, and his name was used to indicate certain classical Chinese stories. The historian Ban Gu classified texts associated with Yu Chu under the umbrella term "minor discourses" (xiaoshuo). The editors of the Siku Quanshu regarded the appearance of New Tales of Yu Chu as marking the popularity of weird fiction.

== Philology ==
In addition to novels and essays, Zhang Chao also made contributions to philology. Zhang Chao enjoyed collecting books from all over the empire and enjoyed editing and carving books very much. He kept close contact with a number of famous textual criticism scholars of his day, such as Zhang Erqi and Yan Ruoqu. When he was editing, he made philological comments on the books he referred to and explored their origin and development.

Zhang Chao was one of the scholars who accepted western learning relatively early. He was very interested in western people and language. Moreover, he took advantage of western learning to study Chinese culture. He held the view that western medicine, law, and astronomy should be introduced to China.
