= Latin American Table Tennis Union =

Unión Latinoamericana de Tenis de Mesa
- Sport: Table tennis
- Jurisdiction: Latin America
- Abbreviation: ULTM
- Founded: 31 August 1973
- Affiliation: ITTF
- Closure date: 2021

The Latin American Table Tennis Union (LATTU), or Unión Latinoamericana de Tenis de Mesa (ULTM) in Spanish, was one of the table tennis continental federations recognized by International Table Tennis Federation (ITTF) before 2021. The ULTM was composed of 37 national or regional table tennis associations, working on the development of table tennis in Latin America.

In 2019, the ULTM and the Northern American Table Tennis Union (NATTU) founded the Pan American Table Tennis Confederation. The Confederation was recognised by the ITTF as the continental federation, replacing both the ULTM and the NATTU in 2021.

== Members ==
List of total 37 member associations:

- Anguilla - Anguilla Table Tennis Association
- Antigua and Barbuda - Antigua and Barbuda Table Tennis Association
- Argentina - Federación Argentina de Tenis de Mesa
- Aruba - Aruba Table Tennis Association
- Barbados - Barbados Table Tennis Association
- Belize - Belize Table Tennis Association
- Bolivia - Federación Boliviana de Tenis de Mesa
- Brazil - Confederação Brasileira de Tenis de Mesa
- Cayman Islands - Cayman Islands Table Tennis Association
- Chile - Federación Chilena de Tenis de Mesa
- Colombia - Federación Colombiana de Tenis de Mesa
- Costa Rica - Federación Costarricense de Tenis de Mesa
- Cuba - Federación Cubana de Tenis de Mesa
- Curacao - Curaçao Table Tennis Federation
- Dominica - Dominica Table Tennis Association
- Dominican Republic - Federación Dominicana de Tenis de Mesa Inc.
- Ecuador - Federación Ecuatoriana de Tenis de Mesa
- El Salvador - Federación Salvadoreña de Tenis de Mesa
- Grenada - Grenada Table Tennis Association
- Guatemala - Federación Nacional de Tenis de Mesa de Guatemala
- Guyana - Guyana Table Tennis Association
- Haiti - Association Haitienne de Tennis de Table
- Honduras - Federación Nacional de Tenis de Mesa de Honduras
- Jamaica - Jamaican Table Tennis Association
- Mexico - Federación Mexicana de Tenis de Mesa
- Nicaragua - Federación Nicaragüense de Tenis de Mesa
- Panama - Comisión Nacional de Tenis de Mesa de Panama
- Paraguay - Federación Paraguaya de Tenis de Mesa
- Peru - Federación Peruana de Tenis de Mesa
- Puerto Rico - Federación Puertorriqueña de Tenis de Mesa
- Saint Kitts and Nevis - St. Kitts-Nevis Table Tennis Association
- Saint Lucia - St. Lucia Table Tennis Association
- Saint Vincent and the Grenadines - St. Vincent and the Grenadines Table Tennis Association
- Suriname - Suriname Table Tennis Federation
- Trinidad and Tobago - Trinidad and Tobago Table Tennis Association
- Uruguay - Federación Uruguaya de Tenis de Mesa
- Venezuela - Federación Venezolana de Tenis de Mesa

As members of ITTF but NOT affiliated to ULTM:

- British Virgin Islands - British Virgin Islands Table Tennis Association
- St. Maarten - St. Maarten Table Tennis Federation

== Competitions ==
Continental and regional championships held by ULTM are as follows:

- Latin American Table Tennis Championships
- Latin American Table Tennis Cup
- Latin American Youth Table Tennis Championships

- Central American Championships, CONCATEME Cup
- Central American Junior and Cadet Championships
- Central American Minicadet (U-13) Championships

- Caribbean Senior Championships
- Caribbean Junior and Cadet Championships
- Caribbean Mini-Cadet (U-13) Championships

- South American Championships
- South American Junior and Cadet Championships
- South American Mini-Cadet (U-13) Championships

Competitions organized by ULTM members and other organizations:

- Pan-American Minicadet (U-13) Championships
- Central American and Caribbean Games
- Central American Games
- South American Games (ODESUR Games)
