= Paula Medina =

Colombian table tennis player

Personal information
- Born: 12 April 1989 (age 37) Tuluá, Colombia

Sport
- Sport: Table tennis
Medal record
Women's table tennis
Representing Colombia
Pan American Games
Bronze medal – third place	2011 Guadalajara	Team
Central American and Caribbean Games
Gold medal – first place	2010 Mayagüez	Team
Gold medal – first place	2014 Veracruz	Doubles
Silver medal – second place	2014 Veracruz	Team
Bronze medal – third place	2010 Mayagüez	Doubles
Bronze medal – third place	2014 Veracruz	Singles
Latin American Cup
Bronze medal – third place	2011 Rio de Janeiro	Singles
Bronze medal – third place	2012 San Jose	Singles

Paula Medina (born 12 April 1989, in Tuluá) is a Colombian table tennis player. She represented Colombia at the 2012 Summer Olympics.

== Career ==
Medina won the gold medal in women's team competition at the 2010 Central American and Caribbean Games in Mayaguez, Puerto Rico. She also won the bronze in the women's doubles.

Medina fell in the semi-final round of the 2011 Latin American Cup held in Rio de Janeiro, Brazil, after being defeated by Dominican Republic's Wu Xue.
