= Fabiola Ramos =

Venezuelan table tennis player (born 1977)

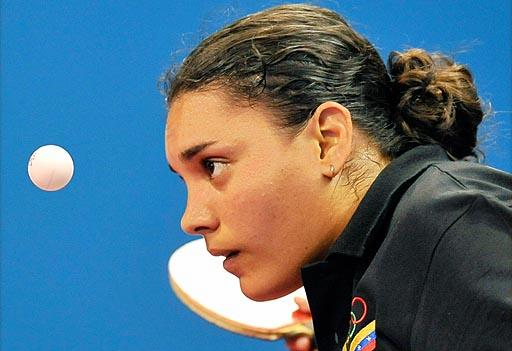
- Fabiola Ramos

Personal information
- Born: 15 September 1977 (age 48) Maracaibo, Venezuela

Sport
- Sport: Table tennis
Medal record
Women's table tennis
Representing Venezuela
Latin American Table Tennis Cup
Bronze medal – third place	2012 San Jose	Singles
Pan American Games
Silver medal – second place	2011 Guadalajara	Team
Bronze medal – third place	2003 Santo Domingo	Doubles
Central American and Caribbean Games
Gold medal – first place	2002 San Salvador	Singles
Gold medal – first place	2002 San Salvador	Doubles
Gold medal – first place	2002 San Salvador	Team
Gold medal – first place	2002 San Salvador	Mixed Doubles
Gold medal – first place	2010 Mayaguez	Doubles
Silver medal – second place	2006 Cartagena	Doubles
Silver medal – second place	2010 Mayaguez	Team
Bronze medal – third place	2006 Cartagena	Team
Bronze medal – third place	2006 Cartagena	Singles
Bronze medal – third place	2006 Cartagena	Mixed Doubles
Bronze medal – third place	2010 Mayaguez	Singles
Bronze medal – third place	2010 Mayaguez	Mixed Doubles

Fabiola Ramos (born 15 September 1977 in Maracaibo) is a Venezuelan table tennis player who competed in her fifth consecutive Summer Olympics in 2012.

== Career ==
Ramos won 4 gold medals at the 2002 Central American and Caribbean Games, in singles defeating Luisana Pérez, in doubles with Luisana Pérez, in team competition with María Ramos, María Mata and Luisana Pérez and in mixed doubles with Antonio Giannini.

Ramos won the bronze medal competing with Luisana Pérez at the 2003 Pan American Games doubles competition.

Playing in Valdivia, Chile she took the bronze medal in singles and mixed doubles with Antonio Giannini, also ranking 4th in the team competition of the 2004 Latin American Championship.

At the 2006 Central American and Caribbean Games held in Cartagena, Colombia, Ramos won the silver medal in women's doubles and the bronze in singles, team competition and mixed doubles.

Ramos win the gold medal in women's doubles at the 2010 Central American and Caribbean Games. She also won the silver in the team competition and the bronze in singles and mixed doubles.

She was selected as their flag-bearer for the 2012 Summer Olympics.
