= Guillermo Muñoz (table tennis) =

Mexican table tennis player (born 1964)

Personal information
- Full name: Guillermo Muñoz Ronquillo
- Born: 15 November 1964 (age 61) Mexico City, Mexico
- Height: 160 cm (5 ft 3 in)
Medal record
Men's table tennis
Representing Mexico
Pan American Games
Bronze medal – third place	2011 Guadalajara	Team
Central American and Caribbean Games
Silver medal – second place	2002 San Salvador	Singles
Silver medal – second place	2006 Cartagena	Team
Bronze medal – third place	1990 Mexico City	Singles
Bronze medal – third place	1993 Ponce	Singles
Bronze medal – third place	1993 Ponce	Mixed doubles
Bronze medal – third place	2010 Mayagüez	Doubles
Bronze medal – third place	2014 Veracruz	Team

Guillermo Muñoz Ronquillo (Note: In this Spanish name, the first or paternal surname is Muñoz and the second or maternal family name is Ronquillo.) (born 15 November 1964) is a Mexican table tennis player. He competed in the men's singles event at the 1996 Summer Olympics.
