= Jessica Yamada =

Brazilian table tennis player

Personal information
- Nationality: Brazil
- Born: 13 October 1989 (age 36) São Paulo, Brazil

Sport
- Sport: Table tennis

Jessica Yamada (born 13 October 1989) is a Brazilian table tennis player. She competed in the 2020 Summer Olympics.
