= Lin Ju =

Dominican Republic table tennis player

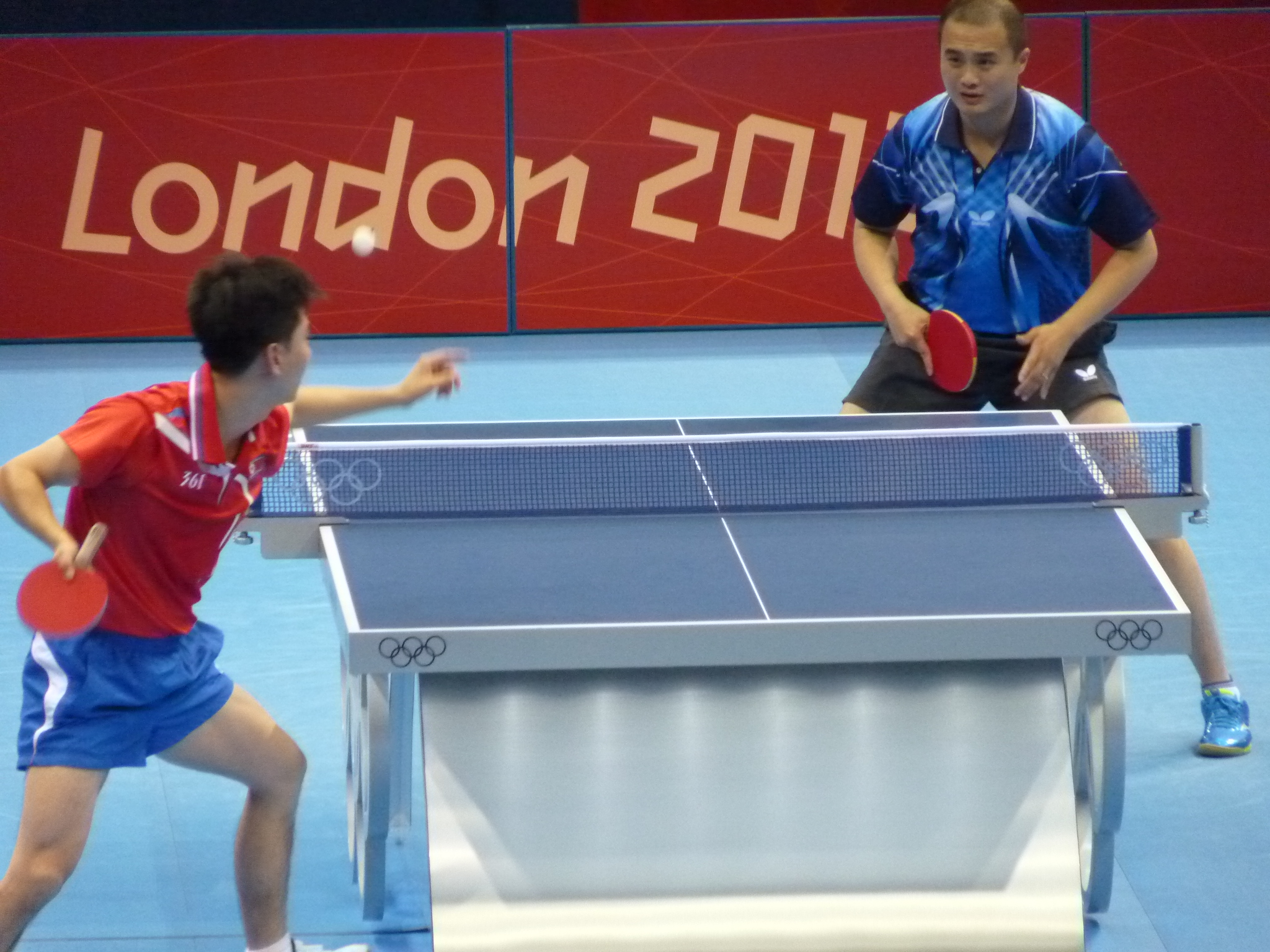
- Lin Ju at the London 2012 Games

Personal information
- Nationality: Dominican Republic
- Born: September 1, 1979 (age 46) Fujian, China
- Height: 173 cm (5.68 ft)
- Weight: 79 kg (174 lb)

Sport
- Sport: Table tennis
- Club: SAG Cestas TT
- Playing style: Classic, Defensive
Medal record
Men's table tennis
Representing Dominican Republic
Central American and Caribbean Games
Gold medal – first place	2006 Cartagena	Singles
Gold medal – first place	2006 Cartagena	Mixed Doubles
Gold medal – first place	2010 Mayagüez	Doubles
Gold medal – first place	2010 Mayagüez	Mixed Doubles
Gold medal – first place	2010 Mayagüez	Team
Silver medal – second place	2006 Cartagena	Doubles
Silver medal – second place	2010 Mayagüez	Singles
Pan American Games
Gold medal – first place	2003 Santo Domingo	Singles
Gold medal – first place	2007 Rio de Janeiro	Singles
Bronze medal – third place	2003 Santo Domingo	Doubles
Bronze medal – third place	2011 Guadalajara	Singles
Latin American Championships
Gold medal – first place	2005 Punta Del Este	Singles
Gold medal – first place	2005 Punta Del Este	Mixed Doubles
Gold medal – first place	2007 Guarulhos	Mixed Doubles
Gold medal – first place	2008 Santo Domingo	Mixed Doubles
Gold medal – first place	2011 Guadalajara	Singles
Gold medal – first place	2012 Rio de Janeiro	Singles
Silver medal – second place	2007 Guarulhos	Singles
Silver medal – second place	2008 Santo Domingo	Singles
Bronze medal – third place	2011 Guadalajara	Doubles

Lin Ju (born September 1, 1979) is a Dominican table tennis player. Lin was one of the 35 athletes that represented the Dominican Republic at the 2012 Summer Olympics at London, United Kingdom. He defeated the North Korean Kim Song-Nam 4–3 in the first round, but lost to the Portuguese Marcos Freitas 0–4, ending his chance for a medal in London.
