= Table tennis at the 2019 Pan American Games – Women's team =

Table tennis – Women's team at the 2019 Pan American Games
- Venue: Polideportivo 3
- Dates: 8–10 August 2019
- Competitors: 36 from 12 nations

Medalists
Gold medal	Adriana Díaz; Melanie Diaz; Daniely Rios	Puerto Rico
Silver medal	Caroline Kumahara; Bruna Takahashi; Jéssica Yamada	Brazil
Bronze medal	Alicia Côté; Ivy Liao; Zhang Mo	Canada
Bronze medal	Amy Wang; Wu Yue; Lily Zhang	United States

The women's team table tennis event at the 2019 Pan American Games was held between 8 and 10 August 2019 at the Polideportivo 3 located at the Villa Deportiva Nacional Videna in Lima, Peru.

== Schedule ==
All times are PET (UTC-5).

Date	Time	Round
8 August 2019	10:00	Round Robin
8 August 2019	17:00	Round Robin
9 August 2019	10:00	Round Robin
9 August 2019	17:00	Quarterfinals
10 August 2019	10:00	Semifinals
10 August 2019	17:00	Final

== Results ==
=== Round Robin ===
The round robin will be used as a qualification round. The twelve teams will be split into groups of three. The top two teams from each group will advance to the first round of playoffs.

==== Group 1 ====
Nation	Pld	W	L	GF	GA
United States	2	2	0	6	0
Argentina	2	1	1	3	4
Guatemala	2	0	2	1	6

8 Aug; 10:00	Guatemala	0–3	United States	Table 4

8 Aug; 17:00	United States	3–0	Argentina	Table 3

9 Aug; 10:00	Guatemala	'–3	Argentina	Table 4

==== Group 2 ====
Nation	Pld	W	L	GF	GA
Puerto Rico	2	2	0	6	2
Cuba	2	1	1	4	4
Dominican Republic	2	0	2	2	6

8 Aug; 10:00	Cuba	1–3	Puerto Rico	Table 1

8 Aug; 17:00	Dominican Republic	1–3	Puerto Rico	Table 2

9 Aug; 10:00	Cuba	3–1	Dominican Republic	Table 1

==== Group 3 ====
Nation	Pld	W	L	GF	GA
Brazil	2	2	0	6	1
Mexico	2	1	1	4	4
Colombia	2	0	2	1	6

8 Aug; 10:00	Brazil	3–1	Mexico	Table 3

8 Aug; 17:00	Colombia	0–3	Brazil	Table 1

9 Aug; 10:00	Mexico	3–1	Colombia	Table 3

==== Group 4 ====
Nation	Pld	W	L	GF	GA
Canada	2	2	0	6	1
Chile	2	1	1	3	3
Peru	2	0	2	1	6

8 Aug; 10:00	Chile	3–0	Peru	Table 2

8 Aug; 17:00	Chile	0–3	Canada	Table 4

9 Aug; 10:00	Canada	3–1	Peru	Table 2

=== Playoffs ===
Quarterfinals
United States	3	3	3
Cuba	0	0	0
Chile	0	2	0
Brazil	3	3	3
Canada	3	3	3
Mexico	1	1	2
Argentina	1	0	2
Puerto Rico	3	3	3

Semifinals
United States	3	1	3	1	0
Brazil	2	3	1	3	3
Canada	2	0	1
Puerto Rico	3	3	3

Final
Brazil	2	3	3	1	2
Puerto Rico	3	1	1	3	3

== Final classification ==
Rank	Team	Athlete
1st place, gold medalist(s)	Puerto Rico	Adriana Diaz; Melanie Diaz; Daniely Rios
2nd place, silver medalist(s)	Brazil	Caroline Kumahara; Bruna Takahashi; Jéssica Yamada
3rd place, bronze medalist(s)	Canada	Alicia Côté; Ivy Liao; Zhang Mo
3rd place, bronze medalist(s)	United States	Amy Wang; Wu Yue; Lily Zhang
5	Cuba	Daniela Fonseca; Idalys Lovet; Lizdainet Rodríguez
5	Chile	Judith Morales; Daniela Ortega; Paulina Vega
5	Mexico	Clio Barcenas; Mónica Muñoz; Yadira Silva
5	Argentina	Camila Argüelles; Ana Codina; Candela Molero
9	Guatemala	Lucia Cordero; Mabelyn Enriquez; Hidalynn Zapata
9	Dominican Republic	Eva Brito; Esmerlyn Castro; Yasiris Ortiz
9	Colombia	Paula Medina; María Perdomo; Cory Téllez
9	Peru	Isabel Duffoo; Angela Mori; Francesca Vargas
