= Table tennis at the 2023 Pan American Games – Women's singles =

Women's singles at the 2023 Pan American Games
- Venue: Olympic Training Center
- Dates: October 30 - November 1
- Competitors: 32 from 18 nations

Medalists
Gold medal	Adriana Díaz	Puerto Rico
Silver medal	Bruna Takahashi	Brazil
Bronze medal	Zhang Mo	Canada
Bronze medal	Lily Zhang	United States

The women's singles competition of the table tennis events at the 2023 Pan American Games was held from October 30 to November 1 at the Olympic Training Center in Santiago, Chile.

== Schedule ==
Date	Time	Round
October 30, 2023	10:50	Round of 32
October 31, 2023	10:00	Round of 16
October 31, 2023	16:00	Quarterfinals
November 1, 2023	10:00	Semifinals
November 1, 2023	17:00	Final

== Results ==
The results during the elimination rounds and final rounds were as follows:

=== Finals ===
Final
Adriana Díaz (PUR)	9	14	11	8	8	11	11
Bruna Takahashi (BRA)	11	12	3	11	11	9	7

=== Top half ===
First Round
Adriana Díaz (PUR)	11	11	11	5	13
Cory Téllez (COL)	7	7	4	11	11
Rheann Chung (TTO)	7	1	5	6
Daniela Fonseca (CUB)	11	11	11	11
Yadira Silva (MEX)	11	11	11	11
Chelsea Edghill (GUY)	4	6	4	8
Camila Obando (VEN)	4	11	5	10
Giulia Takahashi (BRA)	11	13	11	12
Zhang Mo (CAN)	11	9	11	11	11
Mabelyn Enríquez (EAI)	7	11	2	8	5
Nathaly Paredes (ECU)	8	3	11	9	11	2
Ana Codina (ARG)	11	11	9	11	8	11
Paulina Vega (CHI)	11	11	11	11
Gabriela Suarez (ESA)	6	2	5	6
Esmerlyn Castro (DOM)	11	8	3	11	5
Amy Wang (USA)	13	11	11	6	11

Second Round
Adriana Díaz (PUR)	11	11	11	8	11
Daniela Fonseca (CUB)	8	3	4	11	9
Yadira Silva (MEX)	8	11	11	2	11	11
Giulia Takahashi (BRA)	11	8	9	11	8	8
Zhang Mo (CAN)	12	4	11	11	11
Ana Codina (ARG)	10	11	1	4	9
Paulina Vega (CHI)	5	10	8	5
Amy Wang (USA)	11	12	11	11

Quarterfinals
Adriana Díaz (PUR)	11	11	11	9	11
Yadira Silva (MEX)	8	7	8	11	6
Zhang Mo (CAN)	11	11	11	11
Amy Wang (USA)	7	3	7	3

Semifinals
Adriana Díaz (PUR)	11	11	11	7	11	11	11
Zhang Mo (CAN)	13	5	7	11	9	13	6

=== Bottom half ===
First Round
Lily Zhang (USA)	11	11	11	11
Lucero Ovelar (PAR)	4	4	1	8
Eva Brito (DOM)	11	11	6	7	5	8
Zhiying Zeng (CHI)	7	5	11	11	11	11
Lucía Cordero (EAI)	8	11	7	11	13
María Perdomo (COL)	11	2	11	13	15
Lizdainet Rodríguez (CUB)	8	6	5	6
Arantxa Cossio (MEX)	11	11	11	11
Melanie Diaz (PUR)	11	15	6	8	11	5	8
Estela Crespo (CUB)	6	13	11	11	5	11	11
Roxy Gonzalez (VEN)	11	11	7	11	3	11
Ivy Liao (CAN)	6	8	11	9	11	9
Camila Argüelles (ARG)	11	9	8	9	13	7
Angelica Arellano (ECU)	6	11	11	11	11	11
Isabel Duffoo (PER)	4	6	6	7
Bruna Takahashi (BRA)	11	11	11	11

Second Round
Lily Zhang (USA)	11	11	11	11
Zhiying Zeng (CHI)	7	6	4	5
María Perdomo (COL)	5	7	2	7
Arantxa Cossio (MEX)	11	11	11	11
' Estela Crespo (CUB)	11	7	9	13	11	4	6
Roxy Gonzalez (VEN)	6	11	11	11	9	11	11
Angelica Arellano (ECU)	10	2	11	4
Bruna Takahashi (BRA)	12	11	13	11

Quarterfinals
Lily Zhang (USA)	11	11	11	7	11
Arantxa Cossio (MEX)	5	7	7	11	4
Roxy Gonzalez (VEN)	5	9	4	11	13	4
Bruna Takahashi (BRA)	11	11	11	4	11	11

Semifinals
Lily Zhang (USA)	12	5	8	5
Bruna Takahashi (BRA)	14	11	11	11
