= Puerto Rico at the 2019 Pan American Games =

- IOC code: PUR
- NOC: Puerto Rico Olympic Committee

in Lima, Peru 26 July–11 August 2019
- Competitors: 244 in 9 sports
- Flag bearer: Franklin Gómez (opening)
- Medals Ranked 14th: Gold 5 Silver 5 Bronze 14 Total 24

Pan American Games appearances (overview)
- 1951; 1955; 1959; 1963; 1967; 1971; 1975; 1979; 1983; 1987; 1991; 1995; 1999; 2003; 2007; 2011; 2015; 2019; 2023; 2027

Puerto Rico competed in the 2019 Pan American Games which took place in Lima, Peru from July 26 to August 11, 2019.

On June 19, 2019, wrestler Franklin Gómez was named as the country's flag bearer during the opening ceremony.

The Puerto Rico team consisted of 244 athletes.

Originally, Puerto Rico won the gold medal in bowling - men's doubles, though Jean Perez, a member of the bowling team, was tested positive for doping with chlorthalidone, a prohibited diuretic. The Panam Sports Disciplinary Commission announced this positive the day the Lima Games are closed, on 11 August 2019. As a consequence, the Puerto Rican duo loses gold, which passes to the United States. Colombia gets the silver and the bronze goes to the Mexico team.

== Medalists ==
The following Puerto Rican competitors won medals at the games.

Medal	Name	Sport	Event	Date
Gold	Óscar Collazo	Boxing	Men's 49 kg	August 2
Gold	Puerto Rico	Baseball	Men's tournament	August 4
Gold	Melanie Díaz; Adriana Díaz	Table tennis	Women's doubles	August 6
Gold	Adriana Díaz	Table tennis	Women's singles	August 7
Gold	Melanie Díaz; Adriana Díaz; Daniely Ríos	Table tennis	Women's teams	August 10
Silver	Gilberto Clavell; Josué Erazo; Tjader Fernández; Ángel Matías	Basketball	Men's 3x3 tournament	July 29
Silver	Puerto Rico	Basketball	Men's tournament	August 4
Silver	Wésley Vásquez	Track and Field	Men's 800m	August 10
Silver	Franklin Gómez	Wrestling	Men's 74 kg	August 10
Bronze	Miguel Rivera; Luis Colón; Bryan Ribera; Fabiola Ruiz; Arelis Medina	Taekwondo	Mixed poomsae freestyle teams	July 28
Bronze	Jean Pérez	Bowling	Men's singles	July 30
Bronze	Yankiel Rivera	Boxing	Men's 52 kg	July 30
Bronze	Mariecarmen Rivera	Surfing	Women's SUP race	August 2
Bronze	Brian Afanador; Adriana Díaz	Table tennis	Mixed doubles	August 5
Bronze	Brian Afanador; Daniel González	Table tennis	Men's doubles	August 5
Bronze	Melanie Díaz	Table tennis	Women's singles	August 7
Bronze	Nes Rodríguez	Wrestling	Women's 57 kg	August 8
Bronze	Abnelis Yambo	Wrestling	Women's 62 kg	August 9
Bronze	Puerto Rico	Softball	Women's	August 10
Bronze	Ryan Yaviel Sánchez Estrada	Track and Field	800 m	August 10
Bronze	Adrián Gandía	Judo	men's 81 kg	August 10
Bronze	María Pérez	Judo	women's 70 kg	August 10
Bronze	Puerto Rico	basketball	women's	August 10

Medals by sport
Sport	1st place, gold medalist(s)	2nd place, silver medalist(s)	3rd place, bronze medalist(s)	Total
Athletics	0	1	1	2
Bowling	0	0	1	1
Boxing	1	0	1	2
Baseball	1	0	0	1
Basketball	0	2	1	3
Surfing	0	0	1	1
Table tennis	3	0	3	6
Taekwondo	0	0	1	1
Wrestling	0	1	2	3
Softball	0	0	1	1
Judo	0	0	2	2
Total	5	4	14	23

Medals by day
Day	Date	1st place, gold medalist(s)	2nd place, silver medalist(s)	3rd place, bronze medalist(s)	Total
1	July 27	0	0	0	0
2	July 28	0	0	1	1
3	July 29	0	1	0	1
4	July 30	0	0	2	2
5	July 31	0	0	0	0
6	August 1	0	0	0	0
7	August 2	1	0	1	2
8	August 3	0	0	0	0
9	August 4	1	1	0	2
10	August 5	0	0	2	2
11	August 6	1	0	0	1
12	August 7	1	0	1	2
13	August 8	0	0	1	1
14	August 9	0	0	1	1
15	August 10	1	2	5	8
16	August 11	0	0	0	0
Total		5	4	14	23

Medals by gender
Gender	1st place, gold medalist(s)	2nd place, silver medalist(s)	3rd place, bronze medalist(s)	Total
Female	3	0	7	10
Male	2	4	5	11
Mixed	0	0	2	2
Total	5	4	14	23

Multiple medalists
Name	Sport	1st place, gold medalist(s)	2nd place, silver medalist(s)	3rd place, bronze medalist(s)	Total
Jean Pérez	Bowling	1	0	1	2
Gilberto Clavell	Basketball	0	2	0	2
Brian Afanador	Table tennis	0	0	2	2
Adriana Díaz	Table tennis	3	0	1	4
Melanie Díaz	Table tennis	1	0	1	2

== Competitors ==
The following is the list of number of competitors (per gender) participating at the games per sport/discipline.

Sport	Men	Women	Total
Archery	1	1	2
Baseball	24	0	24
Basketball	16	12	28
Boxing	2	0	2
Bowling	2	2	4
Canoeing	2	1	3
Cycling	2	0	2
Diving	1	0	1
Equestrian	1	0	1
Fencing	3	0	3
Golf	1	0	1
Handball	14	14	28
Judo	2	2	4
Rowing	1	1	2
Sailing	3	2	5
Shooting	6	4	10
Softball	0	15	15
Surfing	4	1	5
Table tennis	3	3	6
Taekwondo	6	4	10
Volleyball	12	12	24
Water polo	11	11	22
Weightlifting	3	2	5
Wrestling	3	2	5
Total	122	89	211

== Archery ==
Men

Athlete	Event	Ranking round		Round of 16	Quarterfinal	Semifinal	Final / BM	
Athlete	Event	Score	Rank	Opposition Result	Opposition Result	Opposition Result	Opposition Result	Rank
Jean Pizarro	Individual compound	693	7	Hermoza (PER); W 146–138	Alba (MEX); L 143–144	Did not advance		

Women

Athlete	Event	Ranking round		Round of 16	Quarterfinal	Semifinal	Final / BM	
Athlete	Event	Score	Rank	Opposition Result	Opposition Result	Opposition Result	Opposition Result	Rank
Marla Cintrón	Individual compound	685	6	Bye	Becerra (MEX); L 141–146	Did not advance		

Mixed

Athlete	Event	Ranking round		Round of 16	Quarterfinal	Semifinal	Final / BM	
Athlete	Event	Score	Rank	Opposition Result	Opposition Result	Opposition Result	Opposition Result	Rank
Jean Pizarro; Marla Cintrón	Team compound	1378	5	—N/a	Nikolajuk / González (ARG); L 153–153	Did not advance		

== Baseball ==
Puerto Rico qualified a men's team of 24 athletes by winning the gold medal at the 2018 Central American and Caribbean Games.

Group A

	GP	W	L	RS	RA	DIFF
Puerto Rico	3	3	0	13	5	+8
Nicaragua	3	2	1	17	9	+8
Dominican Republic	3	1	2	13	9	+4
Peru	3	0	3	4	24	−14

Qualified for the Super round

July 30; 10:05	Puerto Rico	7–3	Nicaragua	Baseball Stadium, Lima; Attendance: 1,059
July 30; 10:05		Boxscore		Baseball Stadium, Lima; Attendance: 1,059

July 31; 19:05	Puerto Rico	4–1	Peru	Baseball Stadium, Lima; Attendance: 2,850
July 31; 19:05		Boxscore		Baseball Stadium, Lima; Attendance: 2,850

August 1; 15:05	Dominican Republic	1–2 (F/10)	Puerto Rico	Baseball Stadium, Lima; Attendance: 1,780
August 1; 15:05		Boxscore		Baseball Stadium, Lima; Attendance: 1,780

Super round

	GP	W	L	RS	RA	DIFF
Puerto Rico	3	3	0	17	9	+8
Canada	3	2	1	25	11	+14
Colombia	3	1	2	15	13	+2
Nicaragua	3	0	3	4	28	−24

August 2; 15:05	Puerto Rico	8–5	Canada	Baseball Stadium, Lima; Attendance: 2,100
August 2; 15:05		Boxscore		Baseball Stadium, Lima; Attendance: 2,100

August 3; 19:05	Puerto Rico	2–1	Colombia	Baseball Stadium, Lima; Attendance: 2,313
August 3; 19:05		Boxscore		Baseball Stadium, Lima; Attendance: 2,313

Gold medal match

August 4; 18:05	(gold) Puerto Rico	6–1	Canada (silver)	Baseball Stadium, Lima; Attendance: N/A
August 4; 18:05		Boxscore		Baseball Stadium, Lima; Attendance: N/A

== Basketball ==
=== 5 × 5 ===
Summary

Team	Event	Preliminary round				Semifinal	Final / BM / Pl.	
Team	Event	Opposition Result	Opposition Result	Opposition Result	Rank	Opposition Result	Opposition Result	Rank
Puerto Rico men	Men's tournament	Venezuela; W 73–64	Virgin Islands; W 101–89	United States; W 87–84	1 Q	Dominican Republic; W 65–63	Argentina; L 66-84	Silver
Puerto Rico women	Women's tournament	Paraguay; W 91–73	Brazil; L 58–64	Canada; W 63–72	1 Q	United States; L 62-59	Colombia; W 66-55	Bronze

==== Men's tournament ====
Preliminary round

Team	Pld	W	L	PF	PA	PD	Pts	Qualification
Puerto Rico	3	3	0	261	237	+24	6	Qualified for the Semifinals
United States	3	2	1	273	224	+49	5	Qualified for the Semifinals
Venezuela	3	1	2	204	227	−23	4	
Virgin Islands	3	0	3	257	307	−50	3	

31 July 2019
13:30

Report

Puerto Rico	73–64	Venezuela
Scoring by quarter: 11–12, 15–18, 23–14, 24–20
Pts: Collier 13; Rebs: Andujar 9 Asts: Collier 4		Pts: Colmenares, Zamora 12; Rebs: Colmenares 13; Asts: Vargas 8

Coliseo Eduardo Dibos, Lima
Referees: Leandro Lezcano (ARG)

1 August 2019
10:30

Report

Puerto Rico	101–89	Virgin Islands
Scoring by quarter: 33–11, 26–16, 18–27, 24–35
Pts: Sosa 25; Rebs: Andujar 8 Asts: Collier 3		Pts: Hodge 27; Rebs: Aska 9 Asts: Hodge 5

Coliseo Eduardo Dibos, Lima
Referees: Andréia Silva (BRA)

2 August 2019
21:00

Report

Puerto Rico	87–84	United States
Scoring by quarter: 27–38, 19–19, 18–15, 23–12
Pts: Collier 23; Rebs: Collier 10; Asts: Gandía 4		Pts: Samuels 17; Rebs: Cale 5 Asts: Gillespie, Powell 2

Coliseo Eduardo Dibos, Lima
Referees: Cristiano Maranho (BRA)

Semifinal

3 August 2019
18:00

Report

Puerto Rico	65–63	Dominican Republic
Scoring by quarter: 13–18, 21–8, 15–14, 16–23
Pts: Sosa 13; Rebs: Andujar, Reese 7 Asts: Soto 3		Pts: Suero, Vargas 15; Rebs: Rojas, Vargas 7 Asts: Montero 2

Coliseo Eduardo Dibos, Lima
Referees: Leandro Lezcano (ARG)

Gold medal match

4 August 2019
21:00

Report

Puerto Rico	66–84	Argentina
Scoring by quarter: 18–27, 12–13, 20–20, 16–24
Pts: Collier 19; Rebs: Collier 12; Asts: Soto 3		Pts: Scola 28; Rebs: Scola 9 Asts: Campazzo 12

Coliseo Eduardo Dibos, Lima
Referees: Cristiano Maranho (BRA)

==== Women's tournament ====
Preliminary round

Team	Pld	W	L	PF	PA	PD	Pts	Qualification
Brazil	3	3	0	224	166	+58	6	Qualified for the Semifinals
Puerto Rico	3	2	1	221	200	+21	5	Qualified for the Semifinals
Canada	3	1	2	224	215	+9	4	
Paraguay	3	0	3	174	262	−88	3	

6 August 2019
10:30

Report

Puerto Rico	91–73	Paraguay
Scoring by quarter: 26–14, 18–18, 24–21, 23–20
Pts: Gwathmey 21; Rebs: Rosado 11; Asts: O'Neill 6		Pts: Ferrari 18; Rebs: Ferrari 8 Asts: Ferrari 6

Coliseo Eduardo Dibos, Lima
Referees: Leandro Lezcano (ARG)

7 August 2019
21:00

Report

Brazil	64–58	Puerto Rico
Scoring by quarter: 13–14, 19–17, 19–9, 13–18
Pts: Dos Santos, De Souza 12; Rebs: Dos Santos 4 Asts: Costa 5		Pts: O'Neill 23; Rebs: Pagan 7 Asts: Meléndez, Gwathmey 2

Coliseo Eduardo Dibos, Lima
Referees: Leandro Lezcano (ARG)

8 August 2019
21:00

Report

Canada	63–72	Puerto Rico
Scoring by quarter: 17–26, 11–14, 17–12, 18–20
Pts: Scott 16; Rebs: Jerome 7 Asts: Pellington, Jerome 2		Pts: Gwathmey 22; Rebs: Gibson 7 Asts: O'Neill, Gwathmey 4

Coliseo Eduardo Dibos, Lima
Referees: Leonardo Zalazar (ARG)

Semifinal

9 August 2019
21:00

Report

United States	62–59	Puerto Rico
Scoring by quarter: 18–21, 15–9, 17–16, 12–13
Pts: Carter, Mompremier 14; Rebs: Mompremier 12; Asts: K. Williams 4		Pts: O'Neill 19; Rebs: Meléndez 8 Asts: O'Neill, Rosado 3

Coliseo Eduardo Dibos, Lima
Referees: Leandro Lezcano (ARG)

Bronze medal match

10 August 2019
18:00

Report

Colombia	55–66	Puerto Rico
Scoring by quarter: 9–13, 6–23, 22–14, 18–16
Pts: Mosquera 13; Rebs: Mosquera 6 Asts: Ríos 3		Pts: Gwathmey 13; Rebs: Gwathmey 14; Asts: Rosado 6

Coliseo Eduardo Dibos, Lima
Referees: Leonardo Zalazar (ARG)

=== 3 × 3 ===
Summary

Team	Event	Preliminary round						Semifinal	Final / BM / Pl.	
Team	Event	Opposition Result	Opposition Result	Opposition Result	Opposition Result	Opposition Result	Rank	Opposition Result	Opposition Result	Rank
Puerto Rico men	Men's tournament	Argentina; W 21–12	Dominican Republic; W 21–12	United States; W 20–18	Brazil; W 21–18	Venezuela; W 21–10	1 Q	Dominican Republic; W 21–8	United States; L 21–19	2nd place, silver medalist(s)

==== Men's tournament ====
Preliminary round

Pos	Team	Pld	W	L	PF	PA	PD	Qualification
1	Puerto Rico	5	5	0	104	70	+34	Semifinals
2	Brazil	5	3	2	101	91	+10	Semifinals
3	United States	5	2	3	99	89	+10	Semifinals
4	Dominican Republic	5	2	3	81	98	−17	Semifinals
5	Venezuela	5	2	3	85	104	−19	Fifth place match
6	Argentina	5	1	4	86	104	−18	Fifth place match

Source: Report
Rules for classification: 1) Wins; 2) Head-to-head record; 3) Points scored.

27 July 2019
17:00

Report

Puerto Rico	21–12	Argentina
Pts: Matías 10		Pts: Romano 8

Coliseo Eduardo Dibos
Referees: Gonzalo Paz (URU) / Glenn Tuitt (USA)

27 July 2019
19:30

Report

Dominican Republic	12–21	Puerto Rico
Pts: Beato 8		Pts: Fernández 9

Coliseo Eduardo Dibos
Referees: Kayla Herdman (CAN) / Glenn Tuitt (USA)

28 July 2019
15:00

Report

Puerto Rico	20–18	United States
Pts: Matías 6		Pts: Octeus 8

Coliseo Eduardo Dibos
Referees: Kayla Herdman (CAN) / Gonzalo Paz (URU)

28 July 2019
18:30

Report

Brazil	18–21	Puerto Rico
Pts: De Camargo 6		Pts: Matías 13

Coliseo Eduardo Dibos
Referees: Kayla Herdman (CAN) / Glenn Tuitt (USA)

28 July 2019
20:30

Report

Puerto Rico	21–10	Venezuela
Pts: Fernández, Matías 7		Pts: Martínez 5

Coliseo Eduardo Dibos
Referees: Glenn Tuitt (USA) / Carolina Zachi (BRA)

Semifinal

29 July 2019
10:00

Report

Puerto Rico	21–8	Dominican Republic
Pts: Fernández 11		Pts: Piantini 4

Coliseo Eduardo Dibos
Referees: Kayla Herdman (CAN) / Glenn Tuitt (USA)

Gold medal match

29 July 2019
13:30

Report

Puerto Rico	19–21	United States
Pts: Matías 12		Pts: Octeus, Jeter 8

Coliseo Eduardo Dibos
Referees: Kayla Herdman (CAN) / Gonzalo Paz (URU)

== Bowling ==
Athlete	Event	Qualification / Final														Round robin											Semifinal	Final	
Athlete	Event	Block 1						Block 2						Total	Rank	Round robin											Semifinal	Final	
Athlete	Event	1	2	3	4	5	6	7	8	9	10	11	12	Total	Rank	1	2	3	4	5	6	7	8	Total	Grand total	Rank	Opposition Result	Opposition Result	Rank
Jean Pérez	Men's singles	227	247	300	226	236	285	216	210	245	269	256	238	2955	2 Q	173	193	191	253	163	193	248	215	1689	4644	2 Q	Suartz (BRA); L 213–272345	Did not advance	3rd place, bronze medalist(s)
Cristian Azcona	Men's singles	203	225	226	238	236	229	228	223	258	259	224	200	2749	7 Q	242	238	238	202	191	209	185	233	1798	4547	5	did not advance		
Jean Pérez; Cristian Azcona	Men's doubles	DPG														—N/a													
Sarah Sanes	Women's singles	259	200	171	223	203	191	217	225	206	212	183	188	2478	9	Did not advance													
Taishaye Naranjo	Women's singles	199	192	168	151	169	146	178	153	188	220	203	181	2148	28	Did not advance													
Taishaye Naranjo; Sarah Sanes	Women's doubles	354	362	429	420	350	368	425	450	477	472	430	430	4967	4	—N/a													

== Boxing ==
Puerto Rico qualified two male boxers.

Men

Athlete	Event	Quarterfinal	Semifinal	Final	
Athlete	Event	Opposition Result	Opposition Result	Opposition Result	Rank
Nich Óscar Collazo	–49 kg	Delgado (ECU); W 5–0	Arce (CUB); W 4–1	Martínez (COL); W 4–1	1st place, gold medalist(s)
Yankiel Rivera	–52 kg	Rivera (PER); W 5–0	Veitía (CUB); L 0–5	Did not advance	3rd place, bronze medalist(s)

== Canoeing ==
=== Sprint ===
Men

Athlete	Event	Heat		Semifinal		Final	
Athlete	Event	Time	Rank	Time	Rank	Time	Rank
Eddy Barranco	K-1 200 m	39.245	5 SF	38.251	4	Did not advance	
Nael Irizarry	K-1 1000 m	3.47.779	4 SF	3:56.923	5	Did not advance	
Eddy Barranco; Nael Irizarry	K-2 1000 m	3:50.676	5 SF	3:33.702	5	Did not advance	

Women

Athlete	Event	Heat		Semifinal		Final	
Athlete	Event	Time	Rank	Time	Rank	Time	Rank
Andrea Curbelo	K-1 200 m	50.791	6 SF	48.048	6	Did not advance	
Andrea Curbelo	K-1 500 m	2.18.017	5 SF	2:15.226	6	Did not advance	

Qualification legend: QF – Qualify to final; SF – Qualify to semifinal

== Cycling ==
=== Mountain ===
Athlete	Event	Time	Position
Georwill Pérez Román	Men's cross-country	1:34:48	14
Jacob Morales Ortega	Men's cross-country	1:35:53	16

== Diving ==
Men

Athlete	Event	Preliminary		Final	
Athlete	Event	Points	Rank	Points	Rank
Rafael Quintero	Men's 1m Springboard	354.50	5 Q	382.20	7
Rafael Quintero	Men's 3m Springboard	412.45	4 Q	440.10	4
Rafael Quintero	Men's 10m Platform	413.75	7 Q	449.45	4

== Equestrian ==
Puerto Rico qualified one athlete in equestrian.

=== Jumping ===
Athlete	Horse	Event	Qualification								Final					
Athlete	Horse	Event	Round 1		Round 2		Round 3		Total		Round A		Round B		Total	
Athlete	Horse	Event	Faults	Rank	Faults	Rank	Faults	Rank	Faults	Rank	Faults	Rank	Faults	Rank	Faults	Rank
Freddie Vazquez	Dontez	Individual	7.21	24	16	33	20	36	43.21	35 Q	20	29	Did not advance		20	29

== Fencing ==
Puerto Rico qualified a team of 3 fencers (three men).

Athlete	Event	Pool Round		Round of 16	Quarterfinals	Semifinals	Final / BM	
Athlete	Event	Result	Seed	Opposition Score	Opposition Score	Opposition Score	Opposition Score	Rank
Carlos Pádua	Men's individual foil	2V-3D	12	Aguilera (CUB); W 15 – 14	van Haaster (CAN); L 11 – 15	Did not advance		
Sebastián Tirado	Men's individual foil	2V-3D	14	Imboden (USA); D 11 – 15	Did not advance			
Carlos Pádua; César Luis López; Sebastián Tirado	Men'team foil	—N/a			Colombia; L 37–45	Argentina; L 43–45	Peru; W 45–26	7

== Golf ==
Puerto Rico qualified one male golfer.

Athlete	Event	Round 1	Round 2	Round 3	Round 4	Total		
Athlete	Event	Score	Score	Score	Score	Score	Par	Rank
Edward Figueroa	Men's individual	73	68	75	72	288	+4	22

== Handball ==
Summary

Team	Event	Group stage				Semifinal	Final / BM	
Team	Event	Opposition Result	Opposition Result	Opposition Result	Rank	Opposition Result	Opposition Result	Rank
Puerto Rico men	Men's tournament	Peru; W 27–23	Mexico; L 19–24	Brazil; L 26–35	3	5th-8th place classification Cuba; L 12–36	Seventh place match Peru; W 27–19	7
Puerto Rico women	Women's tournament	Canada; W 23–9	Cuba; L 24–27	Brazil; L 16–40	3	5th-8th place classification Peru; W 43–14	Fifth place match Dominican Republic; L 24–26	6

=== Men's tournament ===
Pos	Team	Pld	W	D	L	GF	GA	GD	Pts	Qualification
1	Brazil	3	3	0	0	108	65	+43	6	Semifinals
2	Mexico	3	2	0	1	81	69	+12	4	Semifinals
3	Puerto Rico	3	1	0	2	72	82	−10	2	5–8th place semifinals
4	Peru (H)	3	0	0	3	56	101	−45	0	5–8th place semifinals

Source: Lima 2019
Rules for classification: 1) points; 2) head-to-head points; 3) head-to-head goal difference; 4) head-to-head goals scored; 5) goal difference; 6) goals scored; 7) draw.
(H) Hosts

31 July 2019; 15:30	Puerto Rico	27–23	Peru	Villa Deportiva Nacional; Referees: Paolantoni, García (ARG)
31 July 2019; 15:30	Nazario 7	(14–10)	Velez 7	Villa Deportiva Nacional; Referees: Paolantoni, García (ARG)
31 July 2019; 15:30	2× (yellow card) 1× (suspension) 1× (red card)	Report	1× (yellow card) 5× (suspension)	Villa Deportiva Nacional; Referees: Paolantoni, García (ARG)

1 August 2019; 13:00	Mexico	24–19	Puerto Rico	Villa Deportiva Nacional; Referees: Zuñiga, Reyes (CUB)
1 August 2019; 13:00	Morales 7	(15–7)	Nazario 7	Villa Deportiva Nacional; Referees: Zuñiga, Reyes (CUB)
1 August 2019; 13:00	2× (yellow card) 3× (suspension)	Report	1× (yellow card) 5× (suspension)	Villa Deportiva Nacional; Referees: Zuñiga, Reyes (CUB)

2 August 2019; 20:30	Brazil	35–26	Puerto Rico	Villa Deportiva Nacional; Referees: Lenci, López (ARG)
2 August 2019; 20:30	Nantes 9	(18–13)	Ceballos, Nazario 7	Villa Deportiva Nacional; Referees: Lenci, López (ARG)
2 August 2019; 20:30	1× (yellow card) 6× (suspension)	Report	1× (yellow card) 5× (suspension)	Villa Deportiva Nacional; Referees: Lenci, López (ARG)

5th-8th place classification

4 August 2019; 10:00	Puerto Rico	12–36	Cuba	Villa Deportiva Nacional; Referees: Lenci, López (ARG)
4 August 2019; 10:00	four players 2	(8–17)	García, Taboada 6	Villa Deportiva Nacional; Referees: Lenci, López (ARG)
4 August 2019; 10:00	1× (yellow card) 1× (suspension)	Report	1× (yellow card) 2× (suspension)	Villa Deportiva Nacional; Referees: Lenci, López (ARG)

Fifth place match

5 August 2019; 10:00	Puerto Rico	27–19	Peru	Villa Deportiva Nacional; Referees: Pineda, Estrada (COL)
5 August 2019; 10:00	Nazario 8	(12–9)	Zerillo 6	Villa Deportiva Nacional; Referees: Pineda, Estrada (COL)
5 August 2019; 10:00	1× (yellow card) 4× (suspension)	Report	2× (yellow card) 4× (suspension)	Villa Deportiva Nacional; Referees: Pineda, Estrada (COL)

=== Women's tournament ===
Pos	Team	Pld	W	D	L	GF	GA	GD	Pts	Qualification
1	Brazil	3	3	0	0	110	48	+62	6	Semifinals
2	Cuba	3	2	0	1	75	68	+7	4	Semifinals
3	Puerto Rico	3	1	0	2	63	76	−13	2	5–8th place semifinals
4	Canada	3	0	0	3	36	92	−56	0	5–8th place semifinals

Source: Lima 2019
Rules for classification: 1) points; 2) head-to-head points; 3) head-to-head goal difference; 4) head-to-head goals scored; 5) goal difference; 6) goals scored; 7) draw.

24 July 2019; 13:00	Puerto Rico	23−9	Canada	Villa Deportiva Nacional; Referees: Paolantoni, García (ARG)
24 July 2019; 13:00	Ceballos 6	(12−4)	three players 2	Villa Deportiva Nacional; Referees: Paolantoni, García (ARG)
24 July 2019; 13:00	1× (yellow card) 1× (suspension)	Report	1× (yellow card) 3× (suspension)	Villa Deportiva Nacional; Referees: Paolantoni, García (ARG)

25 July 2019; 15:30	Cuba	27−24	Puerto Rico	Villa Deportiva Nacional; Referees: Lenci, López (ARG)
25 July 2019; 15:30	three players 4	(14−13)	Ceballos 6	Villa Deportiva Nacional; Referees: Lenci, López (ARG)
25 July 2019; 15:30	4× (suspension)	Report	2× (yellow card) 3× (suspension) 1× (red card)	Villa Deportiva Nacional; Referees: Lenci, López (ARG)

27 July 2019; 18:00	Brazil	40–16	Puerto Rico	Villa Deportiva Nacional; Referees: Sosa, Lemes (URU)
27 July 2019; 18:00	Belo 8	(20–10)	Ceballos, García 4	Villa Deportiva Nacional; Referees: Sosa, Lemes (URU)
27 July 2019; 18:00	1× (yellow card) 5× (suspension)	Report	1× (yellow card) 3× (suspension) 1× (red card)	Villa Deportiva Nacional; Referees: Sosa, Lemes (URU)

5th-8th place classification

29 July 2019; 12:00	Puerto Rico	43–14	Peru	Villa Deportiva Nacional; Referees: Lenci, López (ARG)
29 July 2019; 12:00	Fuentes 8	(24–7)	Cruz 4	Villa Deportiva Nacional; Referees: Lenci, López (ARG)
29 July 2019; 12:00		Report	3× (suspension)	Villa Deportiva Nacional; Referees: Lenci, López (ARG)

Fifth place match

30 July 2019; 12:00	Dominican Republic	26–24	Puerto Rico	Villa Deportiva Nacional; Referees: Zuñiga, Reyes (CUB)
30 July 2019; 12:00	Nova 6	(13–14)	four players 4	Villa Deportiva Nacional; Referees: Zuñiga, Reyes (CUB)
30 July 2019; 12:00	3× (yellow card) 2× (suspension)	Report	2× (yellow card) 1× (suspension) 1× (red card)	Villa Deportiva Nacional; Referees: Zuñiga, Reyes (CUB)

== Judo ==
Men

Athlete	Event	Round of 16	Quarterfinal	Semifinal	Repechage	Final / BM	
Athlete	Event	Opposition Result	Opposition Result	Opposition Result	Opposition Result	Opposition Result	Rank
Jeffrey Ruiz	–73 kg	L Navarro (COL); L 00–01S2	Did not advance				9
Adrian Gandia	–81 kg	Bye	J Martínez (CUB); L 00–01S1	Did not advance	S Ayala (MEX); W 01S1–00S2	J Hatton (USA); W 10S1–00S3	3rd place, bronze medalist(s)

Women

Athlete	Event	Round of 16	Quarterfinal	Semifinal	Repechage	Final / BM	
Athlete	Event	Opposition Result	Opposition Result	Opposition Result	Opposition Result	Opposition Result	Rank
María Pérez	–70 kg	Bye	E Drisdale-Daley (JAM); W 10–00	E Rodríguez (VEN); L 00S3–10S1	—N/a	E Burt (CAN); W 10–00	3rd place, bronze medalist(s)
Melissa Mojica	+78 kg	Bye	Y Bolívar (PER); W 11–00S1	B Souza (BRA); W 01S2–00S1	—N/a	I Ortiz (CUB); L 00S3–10S1	2nd place, silver medalist(s)

== Rowing ==
Athlete	Event	Heat		Repechage		Semifinal		Final	
Athlete	Event	Time	Rank	Time	Rank	Time	Rank	Time	Rank
William Purman	Men's single sculls	7:15.51	2 SF	Bye		7:53.06	6 FB	7:10.58	9
Veronica Toro	Women's single sculls	8:04.50	3 R	7:47.39	1 FA	—N/a		7:54.33	6

== Sailing ==
Mixed

Athlete	Event	Race													Total	
Athlete	Event	1	2	3	4	5	6	7	8	9	10	11	12	M	Points	Rank
Ramon Gonzalez; Tiare Sierra	Snipe	5	6	7	2	4	~~9~~	9	9	7	5	—N/a		Did not advance	54	7
Enrique Figueroa; Gretchen Ortiz	Nacra 17	5	7	7	6	7	6	7	6	3	5	4	~~9~~	Did not advance	63	6

Open

Athlete	Event	Race											Total	
Athlete	Event	1	2	3	4	5	6	7	8	9	10	M	Points	Rank
Agustin Lazaro	Sunfish	~~13~~	11	11	12	8	9	6	9	12	7	Did not advance	85	10

== Shooting ==
Men

Athlete	Event	Qualification		Final	
Athlete	Event	Points	Rank	Points	Rank
Giovanni González	10 m air pistol	560	21	Did not advance	
Giovanni González	25 m rapid fire pistol	534	20	Did not advance	
Luis Ramón López	10 m air pistol	556	27	Did not advance	
Luis Ramón López	25 m rapid fire pistol	545	15	Did not advance	
Luis Mendoza	10 m air rifle	617.2	11	Did not advance	
Luis Mendoza	50 m rifle three position	1148	8 Q	415.4	5
Robert Auerbach Jr	Trap	96	29	Did not advance	
Pedro Lanza	Trap	94	30	Did not advance	
Miguel Pizarro	Skeet	114	19	Did not advance	

Women

Athlete	Event	Qualification		Final	
Athlete	Event	Points	Rank	Points	Rank
Jennifer Valentin	10 m air pistol	561	6 Q	154.7	6
Jennifer Valentin	25 m pistol	551	21	Did not advance	
Yarimar Mercado	10 m air rifle	615.4	12	Did not advance	
Yarimar Mercado	50 m rifle three position	1168 PR	1 Q	404.7	6
Ana Latorre	Trap	96	10	Did not advance	
Paola Sola	Trap	95	11	Did not advance	

Mixed

Athlete	Event	Qualification		Final	
Athlete	Event	Points	Rank	Points	Rank
Luis Ramon López; Jennifer Valentin	10 m air pistol	737	16	Did not advance	
Luis Mendoza; Yarimar Mercado	10 m air rifle	827.4	5 Q	347.0	5
Pedro Lanza; Ana Latorre	Trap	118	12	Did not advance	

== Softball ==
Puerto Rico qualified a women's team (of 15 athletes) by being ranked in the top five nations at the 2017 Pan American Championships.

=== Women's tournament ===
Preliminary round

Team	Pld	W	L	RF	RA	RD	Qualification
United States	5	5	0	37	1	+36	Qualified for the semifinals
Canada	5	4	1	23	7	+16	Qualified for the semifinals
Puerto Rico	5	3	2	18	12	+6	Qualified for the semifinals
Mexico	5	2	3	20	17	+3	Qualified for the semifinals
Venezuela	5	1	4	9	41	−32	
Peru	5	0	5	5	34	−29	

4 August 2019; 10:00	Canada	3–1	Puerto Rico	Campo de Softbol, Lima; Attendance: 357
4 August 2019; 10:00		Boxscore		Campo de Softbol, Lima; Attendance: 357

5 August 2019; 10:00	United States	6–0	Puerto Rico	Campo de Softbol, Lima; Attendance: 312
5 August 2019; 10:00		Boxscore		Campo de Softbol, Lima; Attendance: 312

6 August 2019; 16:00	Peru	2–6	Puerto Rico	Campo de Softbol, Lima; Attendance: 525
6 August 2019; 16:00		Boxscore		Campo de Softbol, Lima; Attendance: 525

7 August 2019; 13:00	Puerto Rico	1–0	Mexico	Campo de Softbol, Lima; Attendance: 0
7 August 2019; 13:00		Boxscore		Campo de Softbol, Lima; Attendance: 0

8 August 2019; 10:00	Puerto Rico	10–1	Venezuela	Campo de Softbol, Lima; Attendance: 0
8 August 2019; 10:00		Boxscore		Campo de Softbol, Lima; Attendance: 0

Semifinals

9 August 2019; 10:00	Puerto Rico	3–2	Mexico	Campo de Softbol, Lima; Attendance: 300
9 August 2019; 10:00		Boxscore		Campo de Softbol, Lima; Attendance: 300

Final

10 August 2019; 10:00	United States	3–1	Puerto Rico	Campo de Softbol, Lima; Attendance: 650
10 August 2019; 10:00		Boxscore		Campo de Softbol, Lima; Attendance: 650

== Surfing ==
Puerto Rico qualified five surfers (four men and one woman) in the sport's debut at the Pan American Games.

Artistic

Athlete	Event	Round 1	Round 2	Round 3	Round 4	Repechage 1	Repechage 2	Repechage 3	Repechage 4	Repechage 5	Bronze medal	Final	
Athlete	Event	Opposition Result	Opposition Result	Opposition Result	Opposition Result	Opposition Result	Opposition Result	Opposition Result	Opposition Result	Opposition Result	Opposition Result	Opposition Result	Rank
Ricardo Delgado	Men's open	Fillingim (CRC); L 7.74–10.67	Did not advance			Satt (CHI); L 6.90–12.06	Did not advance						
Dave de Armas	Men's stand up paddleboard	Martino (PER), Spencer (CAN); L 7.27	Did not advance			Diniz (BRA), Colucci (VEN); L 9.83 Q	Rodríguez (MEX); W 12.70–10.37 Q	Hughes (USA); L 7.96–9.90	Did not advance				
Roberto Ferrer	Men's longboard	Robbins (USA), Flores (CRC); L 6.76	Did not advance			Cortéz (CHI), Villao (ECU); L 3.57	Did not advance						

Race

Athlete	Event	Time	Rank
Omelv García	Men's stand up paddleboard	28:42.5	7
Mariecarmen Rivera	Women's stand up paddleboard	34:38.0	3rd place, bronze medalist(s)

== Table tennis ==
Men

Athlete	Event	Group stage			Round of 32	Round of 16	Quarterfinal	Semifinal	Final / BM	
Athlete	Event	Opposition Result	Opposition Result	Rank	Opposition Result	Opposition Result	Opposition Result	Opposition Result	Opposition Result	Rank
Daniel González	Singles	—N/a			Ramos (COL); W 4–1	Aguirre (PAR); L 0–4	did not advance			
Brian Afanador	Singles	—N/a			Toranzos (PAR); W 4–2	Gómez (CHI); W 4–3	Wu (DOM); L 1–4	did not advance		
Brian Afanador; Daniel González	Doubles	—N/a				Correa / Navas (VEN); W 4–1	Madrid / Villa (MEX); W 4–3	Calderano / Tsuboi (BRA); L 2–4	Did not advance	3rd place, bronze medalist(s)
Brian Afanador; Daniel González; Ángel Naranjo	Team	United States; L 1–3	Ecuador; W 3–1	2 Q	—N/a		Argentina; L 2–3, 0–3, 0–3	did not advance		

Women

Athlete	Event	Group stage			Round of 32	Round of 16	Quarterfinal	Semifinal	Final / BM	
Athlete	Event	Opposition Result	Opposition Result	Rank	Opposition Result	Opposition Result	Opposition Result	Opposition Result	Opposition Result	Rank
Adriana Díaz	Individual	—N/a			Bye	Niño (VEN); W 4–0	Medina (COL); W 4–0	Takahashi (BRA); W 4–0	Wu (USA); W 4–1	1st place, gold medalist(s)
Melanie Díaz	Individual	—N/a			Gómez (PAR); W 4–2	Brito (DOM); W 4–0	Silva (MEX); W 4–3	Wu (USA); L 2–4	Did not advance	3rd place, bronze medalist(s)
Adriana Díaz; Melanie Díaz	Duplas	—N/a				Bye	Argüelles / Codina (ARG); W 4–0	Takahashi / Yamada (BRA); W 4–2	Wu / Zhang (USA); W 4–3	1st place, gold medalist(s)
Adriana Díaz; Melanie Díaz; Daniely Ríos	Equipes	Cuba; W 3–1	Dominican Republic; W 3–1	1 Q	—N/a		Argentina; W 3–1, 3–0, 3–2	Canada; W 3–2, 3–0, 3–1	Brazil; W 3–2, 1–3, 1–3, 3–1, 3–2	1st place, gold medalist(s)

Mixed

Athlete	Event	Round of 16	Quarterfinal	Semifinal	Final / BM	
Athlete	Event	Opposition Result	Opposition Result	Opposition Result	Opposition Result	Rank
Brian Afanador; Adriana Díaz	Doubles	Miño / Paredes (ECU); W 4–0	Lamadrid / Vega (CHI); W 4–2	Tsuboi / Takahashi (BRA); L 1–4	Did not advance	3rd place, bronze medalist(s)

== Taekwondo ==
Kyorugi (sparring)

Men

Athlete	Event	Preliminary round	Quarterfinal	Semifinal	Repechage	Final / BM	
Athlete	Event	Opposition Result	Opposition Result	Opposition Result	Opposition Result	Opposition Result	Rank
Jorge Hernández	–68 kg	Pie (DOM); L 4–16	Did not advance				
Elvis Barbosa	–80 kg	Rivas (VEN); W 14–8	Martins (BRA); L 17–21	Did not advance	Bye	Cobas (CUB); L 7–12	5
Juan Álvarez	+80 kg	Álvarez (VEN); W 21–8	Sansores (MEX); L 4–15	Did not advance			

Women

Athlete	Event	Preliminary round	Quarterfinal	Semifinal	Repechage	Final / BM	
Athlete	Event	Opposition Result	Opposition Result	Opposition Result	Opposition Result	Opposition Result	Rank
Victoria Stambaugh	–49 kg	Vazquez (ARG); W 10–10	Ramírez (COL); L 1–6	Did not advance			
Crystal Weekes	+67 kg	Bye	Carbonell (CUB); L 2–12	Did not advance			

Poomsae (forms)

Athlete	Event	Score	Rank
Luis M. Colon	Men's individual	6.710	6
Arelis Medina	Women's individual	7.210	5
Miguel Rivera; Fabiola Ruiz	Mixed pair	6.360	6
Miguel Rivera; Luis Colon; Bryan Ribera; Fabiola Ruiz; Arelis Medina	Mixed freestyle team	7.000	3rd place, bronze medalist(s)

== Volleyball ==
Summary

Team	Event	Group stage				Semifinal	Final / BM / Pl.	
Team	Event	Opposition Result	Opposition Result	Opposition Result	Rank	Opposition Result	Opposition Result	Rank
Puerto Rico men	Men's tournament	Peru; W 3–1	Cuba; L 1–3	Argentina; L 0–3	3	—N/a	Fifth place match United States; W 3–2	5
Puerto Rico women	Women's tournament	Brazil; L 0–3	United States; L 2–3	Argentina; W 3–1	3	—N/a	Fifth place match Peru; W 3–2	5

=== Men's tournament ===
Preliminary round

Pos	Team	Pld	W	L	Pts	SW	SL	SR	SPW	SPL	SPR	Qualification
1	Argentina	3	3	0	15	9	0	MAX	231	183	1.262	Semifinals
2	Cuba	3	2	1	9	6	4	1.500	245	214	1.145	Semifinals
3	Puerto Rico	3	1	2	5	4	7	0.571	228	245	0.931	5th–6th place match
4	Peru (H)	3	0	3	1	1	9	0.111	187	249	0.751	7th–8th place match

Source: Lima 2019
(H) Host

31 July 2019; 12:30	Peru	1–3	Puerto Rico	Callao Sports Center; Referees: José Alejandro Muñoz (CHI), Ricardo Borroto Iglesias (CUB)
31 July 2019; 12:30	(14–25, 20–25, 25–21, 11–25); P2 P3			Callao Sports Center; Referees: José Alejandro Muñoz (CHI), Ricardo Borroto Iglesias (CUB)

1 August 2019; 14:30	Cuba	3–1	Puerto Rico	Callao Sports Center; Referees: Luis Paulo Beal (BRA), Brian Hemelgarn (USA)
1 August 2019; 14:30	(25–18, 25–19, 25–27, 25–20); P2 P3			Callao Sports Center; Referees: Luis Paulo Beal (BRA), Brian Hemelgarn (USA)

2 August 2019; 12:30	Argentina	3–0	Puerto Rico	Callao Sports Center; Referees: Alejandro Muñoz )CHI), Paulo Luis Beal (BRA)
2 August 2019; 12:30	(25–18, 25–12, 25–18); P2 P3			Callao Sports Center; Referees: Alejandro Muñoz )CHI), Paulo Luis Beal (BRA)

5th–6th place match

3 August 2019; 14:30	Puerto Rico	3–2	United States	Callao Sports Center; Referees: Randy Sánchez (MEX), Alejandro Muñoz (CHI)
3 August 2019; 14:30	(22–25, 25–21, 25–22, 20–25, 15–8); P2 P3			Callao Sports Center; Referees: Randy Sánchez (MEX), Alejandro Muñoz (CHI)

=== Women's tournament ===
Preliminary round

Pos	Team	Pld	W	L	Pts	SW	SL	SR	SPW	SPL	SPR	Qualification
1	Brazil	3	2	1	10	6	3	2.000	215	182	1.181	Semifinals
2	Argentina	3	2	1	9	7	5	1.400	266	256	1.039	Semifinals
3	Puerto Rico	3	1	2	6	5	7	0.714	238	268	0.888	5th–6th place match
4	United States	3	1	2	5	5	8	0.625	259	272	0.952	7th–8th place match

Source: Lima 2019

7 August 2019; 13:00	Brazil	3–0	Puerto Rico	Callao Sports Center
7 August 2019; 13:00	(25–16, 25–16, 25–15); P2 P3			Callao Sports Center

8 August 2019; 15:00	United States	3–2	Puerto Rico	Callao Sports Center; Referees: Jediel de Carvalho (BRA), Rocio Huarcaya (PER)
8 August 2019; 15:00	(25–19, 19–25, 21–25, 25–16, 15–9); P2 P3			Callao Sports Center; Referees: Jediel de Carvalho (BRA), Rocio Huarcaya (PER)

9 August 2019; 15:00	Puerto Rico	3–1	Argentina	Callao Sports Center
9 August 2019; 15:00	(21–25, 25–16, 26–24, 25–23); P2 P3			Callao Sports Center

5th–6th place match

10 August 2019; 15:00	Peru	2–3	Puerto Rico	Callao Sports Center
10 August 2019; 15:00	(25–22, 18–25, 20–25, 25–15, 13–15); P2 P3			Callao Sports Center

== Water polo ==
Summary

Team	Event	Group stage				Quarterfinal	Semifinal	Final / BM / Pl.	
Team	Event	Opposition Result	Opposition Result	Opposition Result	Rank	Opposition Result	Opposition Result	Opposition Result	Rank
Puerto Rico men	Men's tournament	Canada; L 7–20	Cuba; L 8–10	Puerto Rico; L 1–24	4 Q	Brazil; L 4–15	5th-8th place classification Mexico; W 15–14 (PSO)	Fifth place match Cuba; L 7–8	6
Puerto Rico women	Women's tournament	United States; L 3–23	Venezuela; W 9–5	Brazil; L 8–12	3 Q	Cuba; L 5–14	5th-8th place classification Peru; W 15–4	Fifth place match Mexico; W 13–12 (PSO)	5

=== Men's tournament ===
Preliminary round

Pos	Team	Pld	W	D	L	GF	GA	GD	Pts	Qualification
1	United States	3	3	0	0	58	18	+40	6	Quarterfinals
2	Canada	3	2	0	1	51	31	+20	4	Quarterfinals
3	Cuba	3	1	0	2	27	49	−22	2	Quarterfinals
4	Puerto Rico	3	0	0	3	16	54	−38	0	Quarterfinals

Source: Lima 2019
Rules for classification: 1) points; 2) head-to-head points; 3) head-to-head goal difference; 4) head-to-head number of goals scored; 5) goal difference.

4 August 2019; 18:00	Report	Canada	20–7	Puerto Rico	Villa María del Truinfo Aquatic Centre, Lima; Referees: Marcus Gresele (BRA); Daniel Vázquez (MEX)
4 August 2019; 18:00	Report	Score by quarters: 4–0, 5–1, 7–2, 4–4			Villa María del Truinfo Aquatic Centre, Lima; Referees: Marcus Gresele (BRA); Daniel Vázquez (MEX)
4 August 2019; 18:00	Report	Constantin-Bicari 5	Goals	Loubriel 3	Villa María del Truinfo Aquatic Centre, Lima; Referees: Marcus Gresele (BRA); Daniel Vázquez (MEX)

5 August 2019; 18:00	Report	Cuba	10–8	Puerto Rico	Villa María del Truinfo Aquatic Centre, Lima; Referees: Daniel Daners (URU); Fernando Varela (PER)
5 August 2019; 18:00	Report	Score by quarters: 3–3, 1–3, 3–1, 3–1			Villa María del Truinfo Aquatic Centre, Lima; Referees: Daniel Daners (URU); Fernando Varela (PER)
5 August 2019; 18:00	Report	Carales 4	Goals	Loubriel 2	Villa María del Truinfo Aquatic Centre, Lima; Referees: Daniel Daners (URU); Fernando Varela (PER)

6 August 2019; 18:00	Report	United States	24–1	Puerto Rico	Villa María del Truinfo Aquatic Centre, Lima; Referees: Diego Garibaldi (ARG); Daniel Vázquez (MEX)
6 August 2019; 18:00	Report	Score by quarters: 5–0, 5–0, 7–0, 7–1			Villa María del Truinfo Aquatic Centre, Lima; Referees: Diego Garibaldi (ARG); Daniel Vázquez (MEX)
6 August 2019; 18:00	Report	Daube, Vavic 5	Goals	Andino 1	Villa María del Truinfo Aquatic Centre, Lima; Referees: Diego Garibaldi (ARG); Daniel Vázquez (MEX)

Quarterfinal

8 August 2019; 19:30	Report	Puerto Rico	4–15	Brazil	Villa María del Triunfo Aquatic Centre, Lima; Referees: Fernando Varela (PER); Yasmany Lima (CUB)
8 August 2019; 19:30	Report	Score by quarters: 1–5, 1–4, 1–4, 1–2			Villa María del Triunfo Aquatic Centre, Lima; Referees: Fernando Varela (PER); Yasmany Lima (CUB)
8 August 2019; 19:30	Report	Andino 2	Goals	Guimarães 4	Villa María del Triunfo Aquatic Centre, Lima; Referees: Fernando Varela (PER); Yasmany Lima (CUB)

5th–8th place semifinals

9 August 2019; 15:00	Report	Mexico	14–15 (PSO)	Puerto Rico	Villa María del Triunfo Aquatic Centre, Lima; Referees: Fabio Toffoli (BRA); Doriel Terpenka (CAN)
9 August 2019; 15:00	Report	Score by quarters: 4–5, 5–5, 1–2, 3–1 PSO: 1–2			Villa María del Triunfo Aquatic Centre, Lima; Referees: Fabio Toffoli (BRA); Doriel Terpenka (CAN)
9 August 2019; 15:00	Report	Velázquez 4	Goals	five players 2	Villa María del Triunfo Aquatic Centre, Lima; Referees: Fabio Toffoli (BRA); Doriel Terpenka (CAN)

Fifth place match

10 August 2019; 16:30	Report	Puerto Rico	7–8	Cuba	Villa María del Triunfo Aquatic Centre, Lima; Referees: Doriel Terpenka (CAN); Diego Garibaldi (ARG)
10 August 2019; 16:30	Report	Score by quarters: 2–3, 2–3, 1–1, 2–1			Villa María del Triunfo Aquatic Centre, Lima; Referees: Doriel Terpenka (CAN); Diego Garibaldi (ARG)
10 August 2019; 16:30	Report	Loubriel 3	Goals	Carales 5	Villa María del Triunfo Aquatic Centre, Lima; Referees: Doriel Terpenka (CAN); Diego Garibaldi (ARG)

=== Women's tournament ===
Preliminary round

Pos	Team	Pld	W	D	L	GF	GA	GD	Pts	Qualification
1	United States	3	3	0	0	66	10	+56	6	Quarterfinals
2	Brazil	3	2	0	1	31	32	−1	4	Quarterfinals
3	Puerto Rico	3	1	0	2	20	40	−20	2	Quarterfinals
4	Venezuela	3	0	0	3	12	47	−35	0	Quarterfinals

Source: Lima 2019
Rules for classification: 1) points; 2) head-to-head points; 3) head-to-head goal difference; 4) head-to-head number of goals scored; 5) goal difference.

4 August 2019; 11:00	Report	Puerto Rico	3–23	United States	Villa María del Triunfo Aquatic Centre, Lima; Referees: Doriel Terpenka (CAN); Fernando Varela (PER)
4 August 2019; 11:00	Report	Score by quarters: 0-5, 0-6, 2-5, 1-7			Villa María del Triunfo Aquatic Centre, Lima; Referees: Doriel Terpenka (CAN); Fernando Varela (PER)
4 August 2019; 11:00	Report	three players 1	Goals	Haralabidis 6	Villa María del Triunfo Aquatic Centre, Lima; Referees: Doriel Terpenka (CAN); Fernando Varela (PER)

5 August 2019; 8:00	Report	Puerto Rico	9–5	Venezuela	Villa María del Triunfo Aquatic Centre, Lima; Referees: Marie-Claude Deslieres (CAN); Yasmany Lima (CUB)
5 August 2019; 8:00	Report	Score by quarters: 2-1, 2-1, 4-2, 1-1			Villa María del Triunfo Aquatic Centre, Lima; Referees: Marie-Claude Deslieres (CAN); Yasmany Lima (CUB)
5 August 2019; 8:00	Report	Maldonado 3	Goals	Martínez 3	Villa María del Triunfo Aquatic Centre, Lima; Referees: Marie-Claude Deslieres (CAN); Yasmany Lima (CUB)

6 August 2019; 8:00	Report	Brazil	12–8	Puerto Rico	Villa María del Triunfo Aquatic Centre, Lima; Referees: Fernando Varela (PER); Daniel Daners (URU)
6 August 2019; 8:00	Report	Score by quarters: 3-1, 4-3, 2-1, 3-3			Villa María del Triunfo Aquatic Centre, Lima; Referees: Fernando Varela (PER); Daniel Daners (URU)
6 August 2019; 8:00	Report	Coutinho 4	Goals	Montero 3	Villa María del Triunfo Aquatic Centre, Lima; Referees: Fernando Varela (PER); Daniel Daners (URU)

Quarterfinal

8 August 2019; 09:30	Report	Puerto Rico	5–14	Cuba	VMT Aquatic Centre, Lima; Referees: Marie-Claude Deslieres (CAN); Néstor Ricardo Guerra Torres (PER)
8 August 2019; 09:30	Report	Score by quarters: 1–4, 1–2, 1–4, 2–4			VMT Aquatic Centre, Lima; Referees: Marie-Claude Deslieres (CAN); Néstor Ricardo Guerra Torres (PER)

5th–8th place semifinals

9 August 2019; 09:30	Report	Puerto Rico	15–4	Peru	VMT Aquatic Centre, Lima; Referees: Marie-Claude Deslières (CAN); Yasmany Lima (CUB)
9 August 2019; 09:30	Report	Score by quarters: 3–0, 4–1, 3–1, 5–2			VMT Aquatic Centre, Lima; Referees: Marie-Claude Deslières (CAN); Yasmany Lima (CUB)

Fifth place match

10 August 2019; 09:30	Report	Mexico	12–13 (PSO)	Puerto Rico	VMT Aquatic Centre, Lima; Referees: Daniel Federico Daners (URU); Leonardo González Toledo (VEN)
10 August 2019; 09:30	Report	Score by quarters: 1–3, 3–2, 4–4, 2–1 PSO: 2–3			VMT Aquatic Centre, Lima; Referees: Daniel Federico Daners (URU); Leonardo González Toledo (VEN)

== Weightlifting ==
Puerto Rico qualified five weightlifters (three men and two women).

Men

Athlete	Event	Snatch		Clean & jerk		Total	
Athlete	Event	Weight	Rank	Weight	Rank	Weight	Rank
Jorge Sánchez Vélez	–73 kg	132	6	NM		DNF	
Alexander Hernández	–81 kg	NM				DNF	
Luis Lamenza	–96 kg	145	11	175	11	320	11

Women

Athlete	Event	Snatch		Clean & jerk		Total	
Athlete	Event	Weight	Rank	Weight	Rank	Weight	Rank
Gilyeliz Guzmán	–55 kg	80	7	100	7	180	7
Keyshla Rodríguez	–87 kg	88	8	120	7	208	8

== Wrestling ==
Key:
- VT – Victory by fall.
- PP – Decision by points – the loser with technical points.
- PO – Decision by points – the loser without technical points.
- SP – Technical superiority – the loser with technical points and a margin of victory of at least 9 (Greco-Roman) or 10 (freestyle) points.
- ST – Great superiority – the loser without technical points and a margin of victory of at least 8 (Greco-Roman) or 10 (freestyle) points.
- VA – Decision by withdrawal

Men

Athlete	Event	Round of 16	Quarterfinal	Semifinal	Final / BM	
Athlete	Event	Opposition Result	Opposition Result	Opposition Result	Opposition Result	Rank
Franklin Gómez	Freestyle 74 kg	—N/a	Llano (ARG); W 10–0	Balfour (CAN); W 11–0	Burroughs (USA); L 1–4	2nd place, silver medalist(s)
Evan Ramos	Freestyle 97 kg	—N/a	Snyder (USA); L 0–10	Did not advance	Bronze medal contest Salas (CUB); L 0–10	5
Marcos Santos	Freestyle 125 kg	—N/a	Jarvis (CAN); L 0–11	did not advance		

Women

Athlete	Event	Round of 16	Quarterfinal	Semifinal	Final / BM	
Athlete	Event	Opposition Result	Opposition Result	Opposition Result	Opposition Result	Rank
Nes Marie Rodríguez	57 kg	Duanes (CUB); W 8–6	Olivares (PER); W 8–5	Antes (ECU); L 2–13	Bronze medal contest Romero (MEX); W 4–3	3rd place, bronze medalist(s)
Abnelis Yambo	62 kg	—N/a	Mallqui (PER); W 10–0	Rentería (COL); L 0–10	Bronze medal contest Antes (ECU); W 4–2	3rd place, bronze medalist(s)
