= Table tennis at the 2018 Central American and Caribbean Games =

- Venue: Centro Eventos Puerta de Oro
- Location: (Colombia) Barranquilla
- Dates: 19–24 July

The table tennis competition at the 2018 Central American and Caribbean Games was held in Barranquilla, Colombia from 19 to 24 July at the Centro Eventos Puerta de Oro.

== Medal summary ==
=== Men's events ===
Event	Gold	Silver	Bronze
Singles	Marcos Madrid (MEX)	Andy Pereira (CUB)	Brian Afanador (PUR) Jorge Campos (CUB)
Doubles	Cuba (CUB); Jorge Campos; Andy Pereira	Mexico (MEX); Marcos Madrid; Ricardo Villa	Puerto Rico (PUR); Brian Afanador; Daniel González Venezuela (VEN); Cecilio Correa; Marco Navas
Team	Cuba (CUB); Jorge Campos; Livan Martínez; Andy Pereira; Juan Rondón	Puerto Rico (PUR); Brian Afanador; Daniel González; Yomar González; Ricardo Jiménez	Mexico (MEX); Dario Arce; Miguel Lara; Marcos Madrid; Ricardo Villa Dominican Republic (DOM); Samuel Galvez; Mariano Lockward; Emil Santos; Isaac Vila

=== Women's events ===
Event	Gold	Silver	Bronze
Singles	Adriana Díaz (PUR)	Paula Medina (COL)	Idalys Lovet (CUB) Yadira Silva (MEX)
Doubles	Puerto Rico (PUR); Adriana Diaz; Melanie Díaz	Colombia (COL); Paula Medina; Luisa Zuluaga	Venezuela (VEN); Gremlis Arvelo; Neridee Niño Cuba (CUB); Lisi Castillo; Idalys Lovet
Team	Puerto Rico (PUR); Adriana Díaz; Fabiola Díaz; Melanie Díaz; Daniely Ríos	Venezuela (VEN); Gremlis Arvelo; Neridee Niño; Camila Obando; Lisa Palacios	Colombia (COL); Manuela Echeverry; Paula Medina; Luisa Zuluaga Cuba (CUB); Lisi Castillo; Idalys Lovet; Shelly Machado; Lizdainet Rodríguez

=== Mixed events ===
Event	Gold	Silver	Bronze
Doubles	Puerto Rico (PUR); Brian Afanador; Adriana Díaz	Puerto Rico (PUR); Daniel González; Melanie Díaz	Cuba (CUB); Andy Pereira; Idalys Lovet Colombia (COL); Joaquin Villegas; Paula Medina

== Medal table ==
* Host nation (Colombia)

Rank	Nation	Gold	Silver	Bronze	Total
1	Puerto Rico (PUR)	4	2	2	8
2	Cuba (CUB)	2	1	5	8
3	Mexico (MEX)	1	1	2	4
4	Colombia (COL)*	0	2	2	4
5	Venezuela (VEN)	0	1	2	3
6	Dominican Republic (DOM)	0	0	1	1
Totals (6 entries)		7	7	14	28
