= Daniely Ríos =

Puerto Rican table tennis player

Daniely Ríos Mora
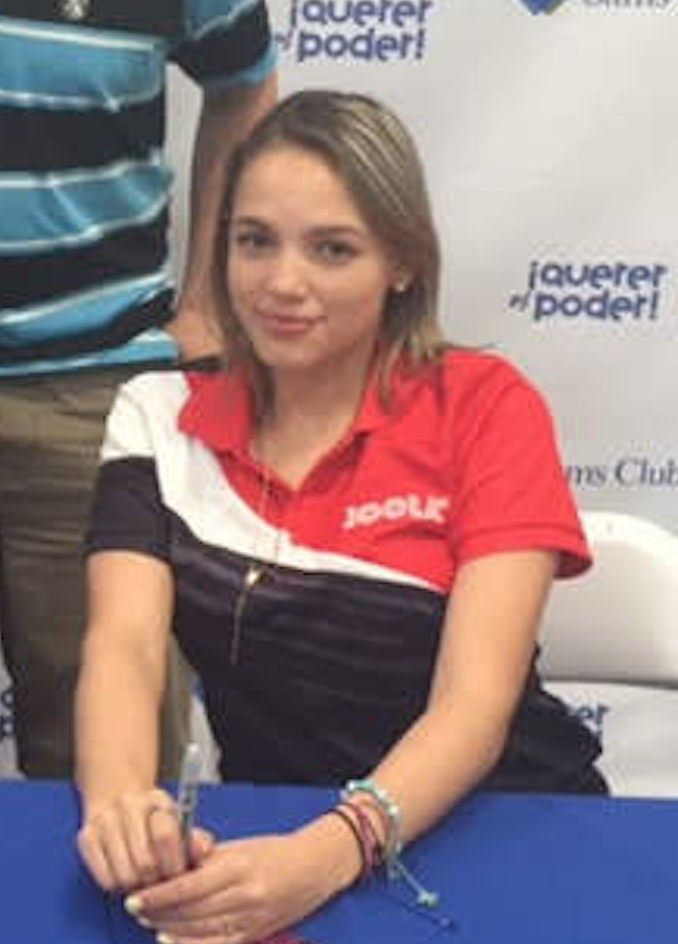
- Ríos Mora in 2019

Personal information
- Full name: Daniely Ríos Mora
- Nationality: Puerto Rico
- Born: April 26, 1996 (age 30) Utuado, Puerto Rico

Sport
- Sport: Table tennis
- Playing style: Attack
- Highest ranking: Senior: 182 (December 2020); U21: 131 (May 2015); U18: 78 (April 2014); U15: 42 (September 2011)
- Current ranking: 182 (December 2020)
Medal record
Women's table tennis
Representing Puerto Rico
Pan-American Games
Gold medal – first place	2019 Lima	Teams

Daniely Ríos Mora (born April 26, 1996) is a retired Puerto Rican table tennis player. As of January 2020, she has been in position 214th with 1660 points in the ITTF Women's World Ranking. In 2019, in collaboration with Adriana Díaz and Melanie Díaz, she was instrumental in earning a gold medal for Puerto Rico's female team in the Pan American Games in Lima. Women's Paraguay Open 2019 was her last international match where she “caused arguably the biggest upset of the day by beating Ilka Doval.”

== Personal life ==
Ríos Mora was born in Santiago, Dominican Republic but was raised in Utuado, Puerto Rico. She was trained by Víctor Pimentel and Bladimir Díaz in the Águilas de la Montaña table tennis club, and has been playing since she was five. In pairs and teams, Ríos has played with the Díaz sisters in various international competitions. In May 2020, Daniely earned her bachelor's degree in mass communications from the Ana G. Méndez University; she is also interested in attending law school.

== See also ==
- Latin American Youth Table Tennis Championships
- Puerto Rico at the 2019 Pan American Games
- Melanie Díaz
- Adriana Díaz
- Brian Afanador
- Bruna Takahashi
- Jennifer Wu
- Lily Zhang
- Caroline Kumahara
