= Table tennis at the 2019 Pan American Games =

- Table tennis pictogram
- Venue: Polideportivo 3
- Dates: August 4–10, 2019
- No. of events: 7 (3 men, 3 women, 1 mixed)
- Competitors: 84 from 18 nations

Table tennis competitions at the 2019 Pan American Games in Lima, Peru are scheduled to be held between August 4 and 10, 2019 at the Polideportivo 3 located at the Villa Deportiva Nacional Videna.

Seven medal events are scheduled to be contested, two singles events, three doubles events and two team events. All the doubles are additions to the sports program from four years ago in Toronto.

== Medal table ==
Rank	Nation	Gold	Silver	Bronze	Total
1	Puerto Rico	3	0	3	6
2	Brazil	2	2	3	7
3	United States	1	2	3	6
4	Canada	1	0	3	4
5	Argentina	0	2	0	2
6	Dominican Republic	0	1	1	2
7	Cuba	0	0	1	1
Totals (7 entries)		7	7	14	28

== Medalists ==
Event	Gold	Silver	Bronze
Men's singles	Hugo Calderano; Brazil	Jiaji Wu; Dominican Republic	Eugene Wang; Canada
Men's singles	Hugo Calderano; Brazil	Jiaji Wu; Dominican Republic	Kanak Jha; United States
Men's doubles	Brazil; Hugo Calderano; Gustavo Tsuboi	Argentina; Gastón Alto; Horacio Cifuentes	Puerto Rico; Brian Afanador; Daniel González
Men's doubles	Brazil; Hugo Calderano; Gustavo Tsuboi	Argentina; Gastón Alto; Horacio Cifuentes	Dominican Republic; Emil Santos; Jiaji Wu
Men's team	United States; Kanak Jha; Nikhil Kumar; Nicholas Tio	Argentina; Gastón Alto; Horacio Cifuentes; Pablo Tabachnik	Brazil; Hugo Calderano; Eric Jouti; Gustavo Tsuboi
Men's team	United States; Kanak Jha; Nikhil Kumar; Nicholas Tio	Argentina; Gastón Alto; Horacio Cifuentes; Pablo Tabachnik	Cuba; Jorge Campos; Liván Martínez; Andy Pereira
Women's singles	Adriana Díaz; Puerto Rico	Jennifer Wu; United States	Melanie Díaz; Puerto Rico
Women's singles	Adriana Díaz; Puerto Rico	Jennifer Wu; United States	Bruna Takahashi; Brazil
Women's doubles	Puerto Rico; Adriana Díaz; Melanie Díaz	United States; Jennifer Wu; Lily Zhang	Canada; Alicia Côté; Zhang Mo
Women's doubles	Puerto Rico; Adriana Díaz; Melanie Díaz	United States; Jennifer Wu; Lily Zhang	Brazil; Bruna Takahashi; Jéssica Yamada
Women's team	Puerto Rico; Adriana Díaz; Melanie Díaz; Daniely Ríos	Brazil; Caroline Kumahara; Bruna Takahashi; Jéssica Yamada	Canada; Alicia Côté; Ivy Liao; Zhang Mo
Women's team	Puerto Rico; Adriana Díaz; Melanie Díaz; Daniely Ríos	Brazil; Caroline Kumahara; Bruna Takahashi; Jéssica Yamada	United States; Amy Wang; Jennifer Wu; Lily Zhang
Mixed doubles	Canada; Eugene Wang; Zhang Mo	Brazil; Gustavo Tsuboi; Bruna Takahashi	United States; Kanak Jha; Jennifer Wu
Mixed doubles	Canada; Eugene Wang; Zhang Mo	Brazil; Gustavo Tsuboi; Bruna Takahashi	Puerto Rico; Brian Afanador; Adriana Díaz

== Participating nations ==
A total of 18 countries qualified athletes. The number of athletes a nation entered is in parentheses beside the name of the country.

- Argentina (6)
- Brazil (6)
- Canada (6)
- Chile (6)
- Colombia (4)
- Cuba (6)
- Dominican Republic (6)
- Ecuador (5)
- Guatemala (5)
- Guyana (1)
- Honduras (1)
- Mexico (6)
- Paraguay (4)
- Peru (6)
- Puerto Rico (6)
- Trinidad and Tobago (1)
- United States (6)
- Venezuela (3)

== Qualification ==
A total of 84 athletes will qualify to compete (42 men and 42 women). Each nation may enter a maximum of 6 athletes (three per gender). In each gender there will be a total of 12 teams qualified, with one team per event reserved for the host nation Peru. Six places will be allocated for singles events (by gender) to athletes that have obtained the best results at the qualification tournament for singles events of the Pan American Games.

== See also ==
- Table tennis at the 2019 Parapan American Games
- Table tennis at the 2020 Summer Olympics
