= Takahashi - Calderano doubles team =

Brazilian table tennis mixed doubles team

The Takahashi - Calderano doubles team, often referred as Calderashi by fans and media, is a Brazilian table tennis mixed doubles team composed of players Hugo Calderano and Bruna Takahashi that have many groundbreaking achievements and titles together.

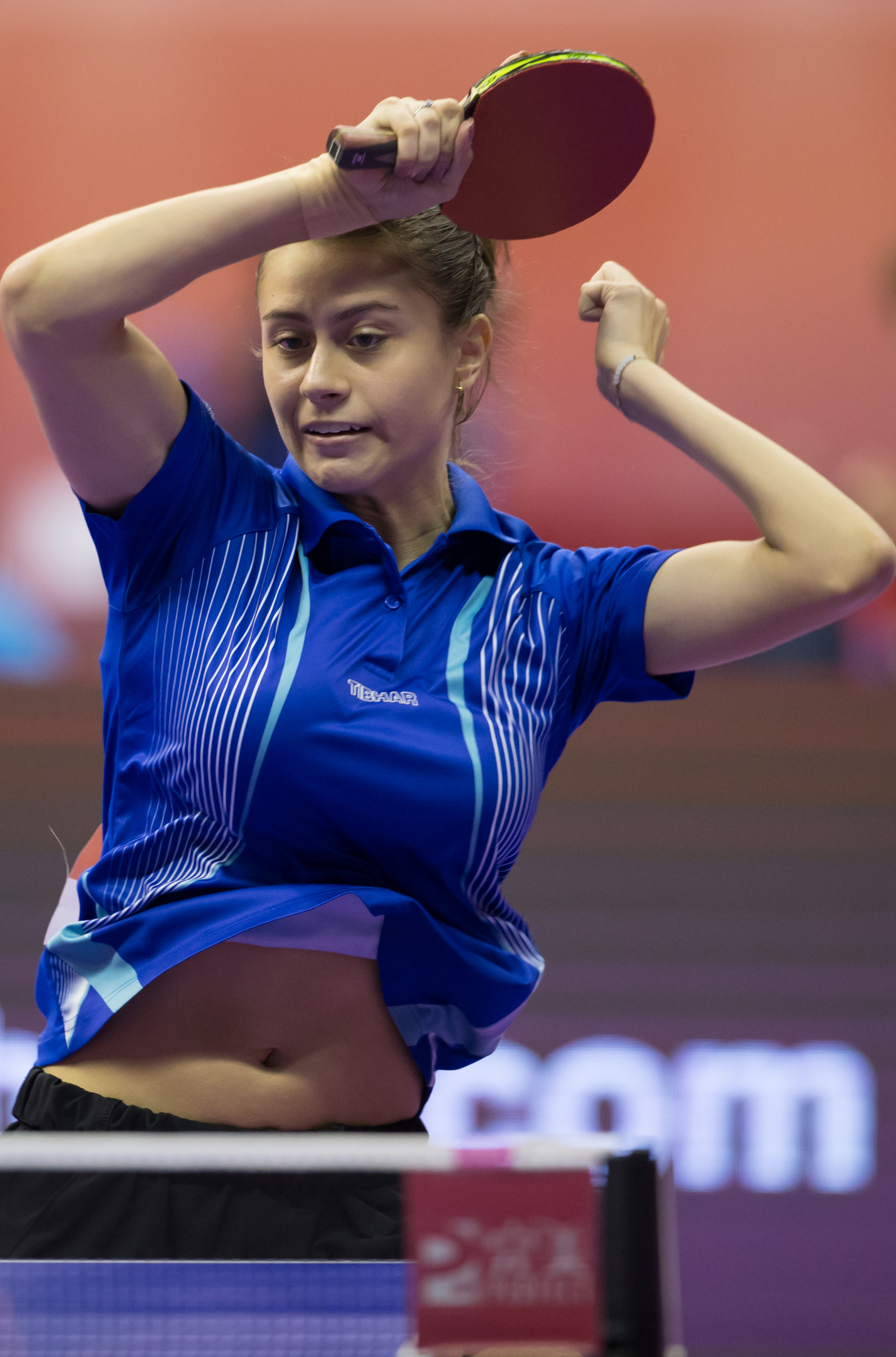
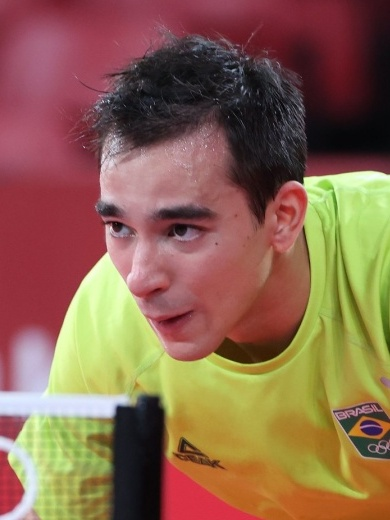
Bruna Yumi Takahashi in 2016 and Hugo Marinho Borges Calderano in 2021

== Career ==
=== Early years ===
The duo first met through table tennis and have known each other since a young age, during their teenage years, when both trained in São Caetano do Sul, in the state of São Paulo. Calderano, a native of Rio de Janeiro, had moved to the ABC Paulista region to further develop his game, while Takahashi, born in Santo André, was already training at the same facility. Their daily interaction at the training center, along with shared experiences in international competitions, brought the two closer together.

Takahashi and Calderano began playing together in 2019, when they formed a doubles team on the ITTF World Tour, more specifically for the Hungarian Open. On that occasion, they passed the qualifying rounds, but were eliminated in the round of 16.

Their collaboration continued intermittently in subsequent years, but they only have been playing officially together since the end of October 2024, at the El Salvador Pan American Games.

=== 2025 ===
At the 2025 World Table Tennis Championships, Takahashi and Calderano participated in the mixed doubles, where they were eliminated in the 2nd round by the world's No. 1 pair.

At the WTT Star Contender Ljubljana, they defeated the world's No. 3 duo, Chun Ting Wong and Hoi Kem Doo, from Hong Kong, and later the German duo Verdonschot/Schreiner and the Hong Kong duo Ng/Yiu to reach the final of the tournament, where they faced the South Korean duo No. 5 in the world and No. 1 seed of the tournament, composed of Lim Jonghoon and Shin Yubin. The Brazilian duo was defeated by 3 sets to 0, thus finishing in 2nd place, with the silver medal.

At the WTT Contender in Buenos Aires, in mixed doubles, they reached the final of a WTT Contender for their first time playing together, and won their first title.

Takahashi and Calderano participated in the European Grand Smash, one of the 4 tournaments equivalent to a tennis Grand Slam on the table tennis circuit, held in Malmö, Sweden in August. In this tournament, they reached the quarterfinals of a Smash for the first time, and, when facing the Japanese duo seeded No. 4 in the tournament, Sora Matsushima and Satsuki Odo, they started winning 2 sets to 0, but ended up being eliminated 3 to 2, being one set away from reaching the semifinals and subsequently a medal.

At the China Grand Smash, Takahashi and Calderano achieved a historic result by defeating the world No. 5 Spanish duo Robles and Xiao and reaching the semifinals, securing a medal, the best result in Brazil's history in mixed doubles. They were the only non-Chinese duo to reach the semifinals of this tournament.

In October 2025, they became Pan American Table Tennis Championships champions in mixed doubles. After these results, Takahashi became the 6th best in the world in mixed doubles.

=== 2026 ===
In February 2026, the pair of Takahashi and Calderano became the 5th best in the world ranking, behind only Asian pairs.

At the 2026 Singapore Grand Smash, Takahashi and Calderano reached the mixed doubles final at a Smash for the first time, defeating the Hong Kong No. 3 ranked pair Wong/Doo. Takahashi and Calderano became the first non-Asian pair to reach a Smash final. The Brazilian pair faced the world No. 1 ranked pair, South Korea's Lim Jonghoon and Shin Yubin, where, in a high-level match, they defeated the Olympic medalists 3-0, becoming the first non-Chinese pair to win a WTT Grand Smash. With this result, they rose to the No. 4 ranked pair in the world.

In March 2026, the Takahashi/Calderano duo was ranked 4th in the world, this being the best ranking obtained by Takahashi in this modality, despite having already made partnerships with other players.

In June 2026, Calderano and Takahashi revealed that Paco Arado had become their personal coach. They also announced that former Brazilian international Vitor Ishiy had retired from professional competition to join their coaching team as an assistant coach and training partner, accompanying them during training sessions and international tournaments.

At the United States Smash 2026, Calderano and Takahashi reached the mixed doubles semifinals, securing the bronze medal. Seeded second, they defeated the American pairs Nandan Naresh and Jessica Reyes Lai in the first round and Jishan Liang and Sally Moyland in the quarterfinals before losing to eventual champions and reigning Olympic champions Wang Chuqin and Sun Yingsha of China in straight games. The bronze medal marked another podium finish for the Brazilian in the season.

After reaching the semifinals of the US Grand Smash, Takahashi and Calderano became the world's number 2 mixed doubles pair.

In July, at the 2026 WTT Star Contender in São José dos Campos, in the interior of São Paulo state, Calderano and Takahashi finished as runners-up. They were defeated by the Japanese duo Shunsuke Togami and Satsuki Odo, ranked No. 44 in the world, losing 3–1 in the final.

== Honours ==
- Singapore Grand Smash – 2026
- Pan American Table Tennis Championships– 2025
- WTT Contender Buenos Aires – 2025

== Personal lives ==
Calderano and Takahashi are currently dating and publicly announced their relationship in February 2024, on Valentine's Day.

"Because of this relationship outside of sports, we have extra confidence in each other during the game. I know I can say anything I need to say there, and so can she. If I ask her to do something, there won't be any doubt. We managed to build this with experience, with time. Trusting each other is much easier when we spend every day together in our lives"– Calderano emphasized.

Takahashi described the team’s atmosphere as being based on trust and friendship.

Despite public awareness of their relationship, both athletes have emphasized a clear separation between their personal lives and professional conduct during competitions. They have stated that their on-court behavior remains focused on performance and results, without specific arrangements regarding celebrations or interactions during matches.

== Results at senior level ==
Year	Venue	Mixed Doubles
World Championships
2025	Doha, Qatar	Round of 32
WTT Finals
2025	Hong Kong, China	Group stage
Pan American Championships
2024	San Salvador, El Salvador	Silver Medal
2025	(United States) Rock Hill, USA	Gold Medal

Tournaments		2021	2022	2023	2024	2025	2026
WTT Grand Smash	Singapore					R16	W
WTT Grand Smash	(Sweden) Europe					QF	
WTT Grand Smash	China					SF	
WTT Grand Smash	United States						SF
WTT Star Contender
WTT Star Contender	(Qatar) Doha						
WTT Star Contender	(Hungary) Budapest						
WTT Star Contender	(Slovenia) Ljubljana					F	QF
WTT Star Contender	(India) Goa						
WTT Star Contender	Brazil					QF	F
WTT Contender	(Tunisia) Tunis						
WTT Contender	(South Africa) Durban						
WTT Contender	(Qatar) Doha						
WTT Contender	(Oman) Muscat						
WTT Contender	(Brazil) Rio de Janeiro						
WTT Contender	(Argentina) Buenos Aires					W	

Key
W	F	SF	QF	#R

(W) winner; (F) finalist; (SF) semifinalist; (QF) quarterfinalist; (#R) rounds
