= Table tennis at the 2019 Pan American Games – Mixed doubles =

Table tennis – Mixed doubles at the 2019 Pan American Games
- Venue: Polideportivo 3
- Dates: 4–5 August 2019
- Competitors: 30 from 15 nations

Medalists
Gold medal	Eugene Wang; Zhang Mo	Canada
Silver medal	Gustavo Tsuboi; Bruna Takahashi	Brazil
Bronze medal	Kanak Jha; Jennifer Wu	United States
Bronze medal	Brian Afanador; Adriana Díaz	Puerto Rico

The mixed doubles table tennis event at the 2019 Pan American Games was held from 4 to 5 August 2019 at the Polideportivo 3 in Lima, Peru. 15 nations sent competitors, from which the winning country would be Canada.

== Results ==
=== Draw ===
First Round; 4 August 10:00
Jiaji Wu (DOM); Yasiris Ortiz (DOM)	6	11	7	11	11	11
Marcelo Aguirre (PAR); Leyla Gómez (PAR)	11	6	11	9	5	9
Horacio Cifuentes (ARG); Camila Argüelles (ARG)	11	15	12	6	8	8	6
Jorge Campos (CUB); Daniela Fonseca (CUB)	7	13	10	11	11	11	11
Julián Ramos (COL); Paula Medina (COL)	2	4	7	14
Eugene Wang (CAN); Zhang Mo (CAN)	11	11	11	16
Gustavo Tsuboi (BRA); Bruna Takahashi (BRA)	7	11	8	11	11	11
Marco Navas (VEN); Neridee Niño (VEN)	11	4	11	4	4	5
Hector Gatica (GUA); Mabelyn Enriquez (GUA)	3	10	11	6	11	3
Marcos Madrid (MEX); Yadira Silva (MEX)	11	12	3	11	6	11
Juan Lamadrid (CHI); Paulina Vega (CHI)	11	11	11	11
Rodrigo Hidalgo (PER); Francesca Vargas (PER)	5	7	6	7
Alberto Miño (ECU); Nathaly Paredes (ECU)	8	5	12	5
Brian Afanador (PUR); Adriana Díaz (PUR)	11	11	14	11

Quarterfinals; 4 August 18:00
Kanak Jha (USA); Jennifer Wu (USA)	9	11	11	11	11	11
Jiaji Wu (DOM); Yasiris Ortiz (DOM)	11	8	6	9	13	9
Jorge Campos (CUB); Daniela Fonseca (CUB)	4	4	5	3
Eugene Wang (CAN); Zhang Mo (CAN)	11	11	11	11
Gustavo Tsuboi (BRA); Bruna Takahashi (BRA)	11	11	8	11	11
Marcos Madrid (MEX); Yadira Silva (MEX)	3	3	11	4	8
Juan Lamadrid (CHI); Paulina Vega (CHI)	11	11	8	6	5	8
Brian Afanador (PUR); Adriana Díaz (PUR)	6	5	11	11	11	11

Semifinals; 5 August 10:00
Kanak Jha (USA); Jennifer Wu (USA)	9	11	4	7	6
Eugene Wang (CAN); Zhang Mo (CAN)	11	9	11	11	11
Gustavo Tsuboi (BRA); Bruna Takahashi (BRA)	7	13	15	11	11
Brian Afanador (PUR); Adriana Díaz (PUR)	11	11	13	9	7

Final; 5 August 20:45
Eugene Wang (CAN); Zhang Mo (CAN)	12	15	6	11	12
Gustavo Tsuboi (BRA); Bruna Takahashi (BRA)	10	13	11	7	10
