= Taekwondo at the 2019 Pan American Games – Mixed poomsae freestyle teams =

Mixed poomsae freestyle teams at the 2019 Pan American Games
- Venue: Polideportivo Callao
- Dates: July 28
- Competitors: 30 from 6 nations
- Winning score: 7.240

Medalists
Gold medal	Ethan Sun; Sae-Jin Yi; Kayrn Real; Andrew Lee; Alex Lee	United States
Silver medal	Mark Bush; AJ Assadian; Jinsu Ha; Valerie Ho; Michelle Lee	Canada
Bronze medal	Miguel Rivera; Luis Colon; Bryan Ribera; Fabiola Ruiz; Arelis Medina	Puerto Rico

The mixed poomsae freestyle teams competition of the taekwondo events at the 2019 Pan American Games took place on July 28 at the Polideportivo Callao.

== Results ==
Position	Athletes	Country	Total
1st place, gold medalist(s)	Ethan Sun; Sae-Jin Yi; Kayrn Real; Andrew Lee; Alex Lee	United States	7.240
2nd place, silver medalist(s)	Mark Bush; AJ Assadian; Jinsu Ha; Valerie Ho; Michelle Lee	Canada	7.120
3rd place, bronze medalist(s)	Miguel Rivera; Luis Colon; Bryan Ribera; Fabiola Ruiz; Arelis Medina	Puerto Rico	7.000
4	Marco Arroyo; Daniela Rodriguez; Paula Fregoso; Leonardo Juarez; Ana Ibanez	Mexico	6.920
5	Eduardo Garrido; Maria Eufragio; Dany Coy; Hector Morales; Maria Higueros	Guatemala	6.860
6	Marcela Castillo; Hugo Del Castillo; Jose Montejo; Renzo Saux; Ariana Vera	Peru	6.580
