= Table tennis at the 2019 Pan American Games – Women's doubles =

Table tennis – Women's doubles at the 2019 Pan American Games
- Venue: Polideportivo 3
- Dates: 4–5 August 2019
- Competitors: 26 from 13 nations

Medalists
Gold medal	Adriana Díaz; Melanie Díaz	Puerto Rico
Silver medal	Jennifer Wu; Lily Zhang	United States
Bronze medal	Alicia Côté; Zhang Mo	Canada
Bronze medal	Bruna Takahashi; Jessica Yamada	Brazil

The women's doubles table tennis event at the 2019 Pan American Games will be held from 4 to 5 August 2019 at the Polideportivo 3 in Lima, Peru.

== Results ==
=== Draw ===
First Round; 4 August 12:00
Clio Barcenas (MEX); Yadira Silva (MEX)	13	7	11	11	11
Paula Medina (COL); María Perdomo (COL)	11	11	5	6	9
Daniela Ortega (CHI); Paulina Vega (CHI)	3	11	11	10	11	10	13
Daniela Fonseca (CUB); Idalys Lovet (CUB)	11	7	5	12	6	12	11
Lucía Cordero (GUA); Mabelyn Enriquez (GUA)	6	11	7	8	11
Alicia Côté (CAN); Zhang Mo (CAN)	11	7	11	11	13
Angela Mori (PER); Francesca Vargas (PER)	9	5	17	4	6
Esmerlyn Castro (DOM); Yasiris Ortiz (DOM)	11	11	15	11	11
Camila Argüelles (ARG); Ana Codina (ARG)	11	12	11	9	11
Nathaly Paredes (ECU); Mylena Plaza (ECU)	4	10	5	11	6

Quarterfinals; 4 August 19:00
Jennifer Wu (USA); Lily Zhang (USA)	12	13	15	14
Clio Barcenas (MEX); Yadira Silva (MEX)	10	11	13	12
Daniela Ortega (CHI); Paulina Vega (CHI)	15	7	5	9	3
Alicia Côté (CAN); Zhang Mo (CAN)	13	11	11	11	11
Bruna Takahashi (BRA); Jessica Yamada (BRA)	11	11	11	17	11
Esmerlyn Castro (DOM); Yasiris Ortiz (DOM)	9	8	4	19	9
Camila Argüelles (ARG); Ana Codina (ARG)	11	8	6	4	8
Adriana Díaz (PUR); Melanie Díaz (PUR)	9	11	11	11	11

Semifinals; 5 August 18:15
Jennifer Wu (USA); Lily Zhang (USA)	11	11	8	11	12
Alicia Côté (CAN); Zhang Mo (CAN)	3	6	11	2	10
Bruna Takahashi (BRA); Jessica Yamada (BRA)	7	11	12	8	3	6
Adriana Díaz (PUR); Melanie Díaz (PUR)	11	6	10	11	11	11

Final; 6 August
Jennifer Wu (USA); Lily Zhang (USA)	11	8	12	7	11	8	7
Adriana Díaz (PUR); Melanie Díaz (PUR)	7	11	10	11	6	11	11
