= Melanie Díaz =

Puerto Rican table tennis player

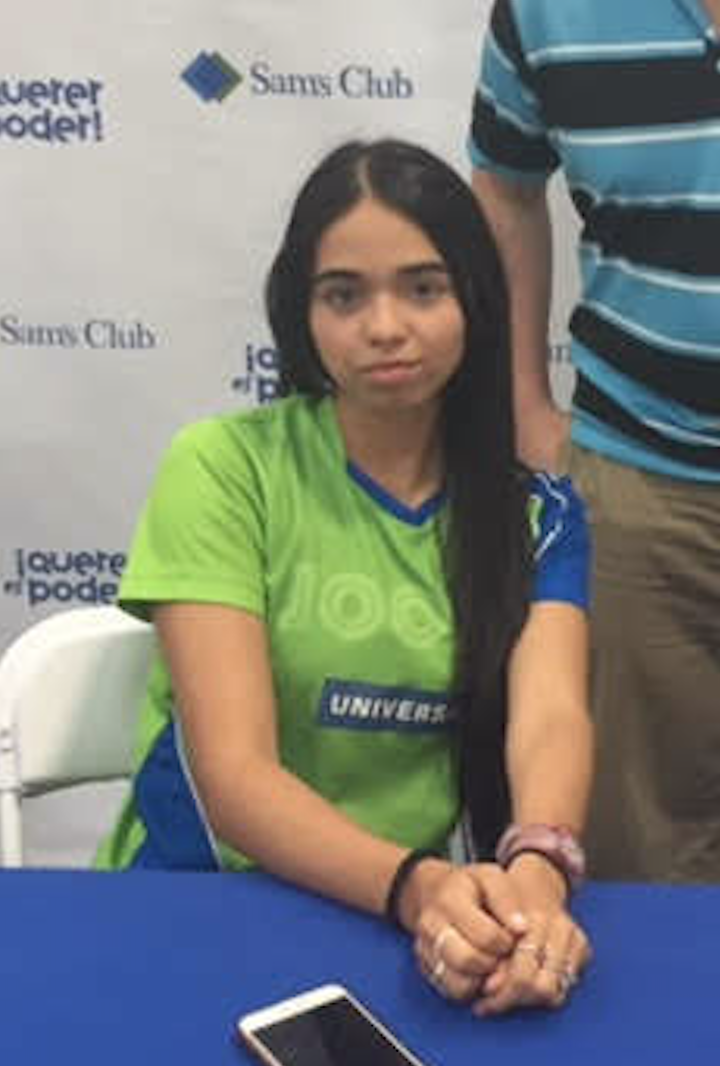
- Díaz at a meet-and-greet in Mayagüez, 2019

Personal information
- Full name: Melanie Díaz González
- Nationality: Puerto Rico
- Born: May 7, 1996 (age 30) Utuado, Puerto Rico

Sport
- Sport: Table tennis
- Playing style: Attack
- Highest ranking: Senior: 61 (October 2019); U21: 84 (May 2017); U18: 91 (May 2014); U15: 92 (January 2011)
- Current ranking: 68 (April 2020)
Medal record
Women's table tennis
Representing Puerto Rico
Pan-American Games
Gold medal – first place	2019 Lima	Teams
Gold medal – first place	2019 Lima	Doubles
Silver medal – second place	2023 Santiago	Team
Bronze medal – third place	2019 Lima	Singles
Bronze medal – third place	2023 Santiago	Doubles

Melanie Díaz González (born May 7, 1996) is a Puerto Rican table tennis player. As of August 2019, she has been in position 88th with 3840 points in the ITTF Women's World Ranking.

== Personal life ==
Melanie Díaz was born on May 7, 1996, to Bladimir Díaz and Marangely González and is the eldest of four sisters who also are table tennis athletes, Fabiola, Gabriela and Adriana. Her paternal grandmother established and developed table tennis as a major sport in the mountainous municipality of Utuado, where her family grew up. Compared to other players at her level, she's trained and coached by her own father. Melanie is also cousin to table tennis player Brian Afanador from her mother's side. She is a supporter and advocate of the animal rights movement and practices veganism.

Díaz married Czech table tennis player Tomáš Polanský on December 28, 2025 in Utuado, after the pair got engaged in May 2025 in Hawaii.

== Career ==
=== International rise ===
Melanie Díaz erupted onto the international arena by winning silver in the women's doubles alongside her sister Adriana during the 2014 Central American and Caribbean Games. In 2015, she won her first Pan American bronze medal in the women's team competition alongside Adriana Díaz and teammate, Carelyn Cordero at the 2015 Pan American Games.

At the 2018 Central American and Caribbean Games Melanie Díaz scored two gold medals. The first gold came from competing with Adriana in the women's doubles. The second came from playing in the female team alongside her sisters Adriana and Fabiola, and Daniely Ríos. She also won silver in mixed doubles playing with Daniel González.

=== Turning point at Lima 2019 ===
Melanie Díaz first attained individual international recognition during the 2019 Pan American Games in Lima, where she was seeded #6 in the women category. She helped win the first Pan American Table Tennis gold for Puerto Rico when playing at the Women's doubles beside her sister Adriana. Díaz also established her status as a separate international medalist by winning individual bronze at the Women's singles. She shared the bronze podium at this event's medal ceremony with Brazilian Bruna Takahashi. Díaz finally played against Bruna Takahashi in a close and lively game during the final women's team, in which she helped earn one more gold for her team. Because of her playing skills in this match, international press nicknamed the female players of the Puerto Rican team as the "comeback kids."

== See also ==
- Adriana Díaz
- Brian Afanador
- Bruna Takahashi
- Caroline Kumahara
- Jennifer Wu
- Lily Zhang
- Puerto Rico at the 2019 Pan American Games
