= Table tennis at the 2019 Pan American Games – Women's singles =

Table tennis – Women's singles at the 2019 Pan American Games
- Venue: Polideportivo 3
- Dates: August 5 – 7
- Competitors: 30 from 17 nations

Medalists
Gold medal	Adriana Díaz	Puerto Rico
Silver medal	Jennifer Wu	United States
Bronze medal	Melanie Díaz	Puerto Rico
Bronze medal	Bruna Takahashi	Brazil

The women's singles table tennis event at the 2019 Pan American Games was held from August 5 – 7 at the Polideportivo 3 in Lima, Peru..

== Results ==
=== Finals ===
Final; 7 August 18:00
Jennifer Wu (USA)	8	3	9	11	6
Adriana Díaz (PUR)	11	11	11	8	11

=== Top half ===
First round 5 August 11:00
Angela Mori (PER)	4	10	1	11	6
Yadira Silva (MEX)	11	12	11	9	11
Eva Brito (DOM)	4	11	11	11	11
Rheann Chung (TRI)	11	6	9	8	5
Leyla Gómez (PAR)	11	5	11	8	11	3
Melanie Díaz (PUR)	13	11	9	11	5	11
Paulina Vega (CHI)	11	11	3	11	9	11
María Perdomo (COL)	7	1	11	9	11	7
Hidalynn Zapata (GUA)	9	13	11	6	13	14	11
Ana Codina (ARG)	11	11	4	11	15	12	9
Jessica Yamada (BRA)	11	11	6	9	11	11
Daniela Fonseca (CUB)	9	6	11	11	8	7
Mylena Plaza (ECU)	7	6	9	9
Jennifer Wu (USA)	11	11	11	11

Second round 6 August 10:00
Zhang Mo (CAN)	12	8	9	8	8
Yadira Silva (MEX)	10	11	11	11	11
Eva Brito (DOM)	7	6	7	6
Melanie Díaz (PUR)	11	11	11	11
Paulina Vega (CHI)	11	11	10	8	9	11	11
Hidalynn Zapata (GUA)	9	7	12	11	11	4	5
Jessica Yamada (BRA)	5	5	6	11	15	11	8
Jennifer Wu (USA)	11	11	11	3	13	7	11

Quarterfinals; 6 August 15:00
Yadira Silva (MEX)	11	11	8	8	5	12	10
Melanie Díaz (PUR)	8	8	11	11	11	10	12
Paulina Vega (CHI)	12	3	8	10
Jennifer Wu (USA)	14	11	11	12

Semifinals; 7 August 10:00
Melanie Díaz (PUR)	11	5	12	6	6	5
Jennifer Wu (USA)	8	11	10	11	11	11

=== Bottom half ===
First round 5 August 11:00
Lily Zhang (USA)	11	11	11	11
Francesca Vargas (PER)	1	4	2	6
Idalys Lovet (CUB)	11	11	9	11	8	7	11
Mabelyn Enriquez (GUA)	6	8	11	8	11	11	8
Daniela Ortega (CHI)	10	4	11	11	7	11	12
Yasiris Ortiz (DOM)	12	11	9	9	11	5	14
Nathaly Paredes (ECU)	6	6	17	5	4
Bruna Takahashi (BRA)	11	11	15	11	11
Paula Medina (COL)	11	13	11	13
Chelsea Edghill (GUY)	8	11	9	11
Clio Barcenas (MEX)	9	7	11	12
Camila Argüelles (ARG)	11	11	13	14
Alicia Côté (CAN)	14	11	11	12	3	9
Neridee Niño (VEN)	16	9	7	14	11	11

Second round 6 August 10:00
Lily Zhang (USA)	11	11	11	11
Idalys Lovet (CUB)	8	4	4	1
Yasiris Ortiz (DOM)	6	6	1	7
Bruna Takahashi (BRA)	11	11	11	11
Paula Medina (COL)	11	11	11	11
Camila Argüelles (ARG)	9	7	9	6
Neridee Niño (VEN)	6	8	7	9
Adriana Díaz (PUR)	11	11	11	11

Quarterfinals; 6 August 15:00
Lily Zhang (USA)	11	11	9	9	11	6	9
Bruna Takahashi (BRA)	6	5	11	11	8	11	11
Paula Medina (COL)	7	9	4	6
Adriana Díaz (PUR)	11	11	11	11

Semifinals; 7 August 10:00
Bruna Takahashi (BRA)	9	8	3	4
Adriana Díaz (PUR)	11	11	11	11
