= Bruna Takahashi =

Brazilian table tennis player

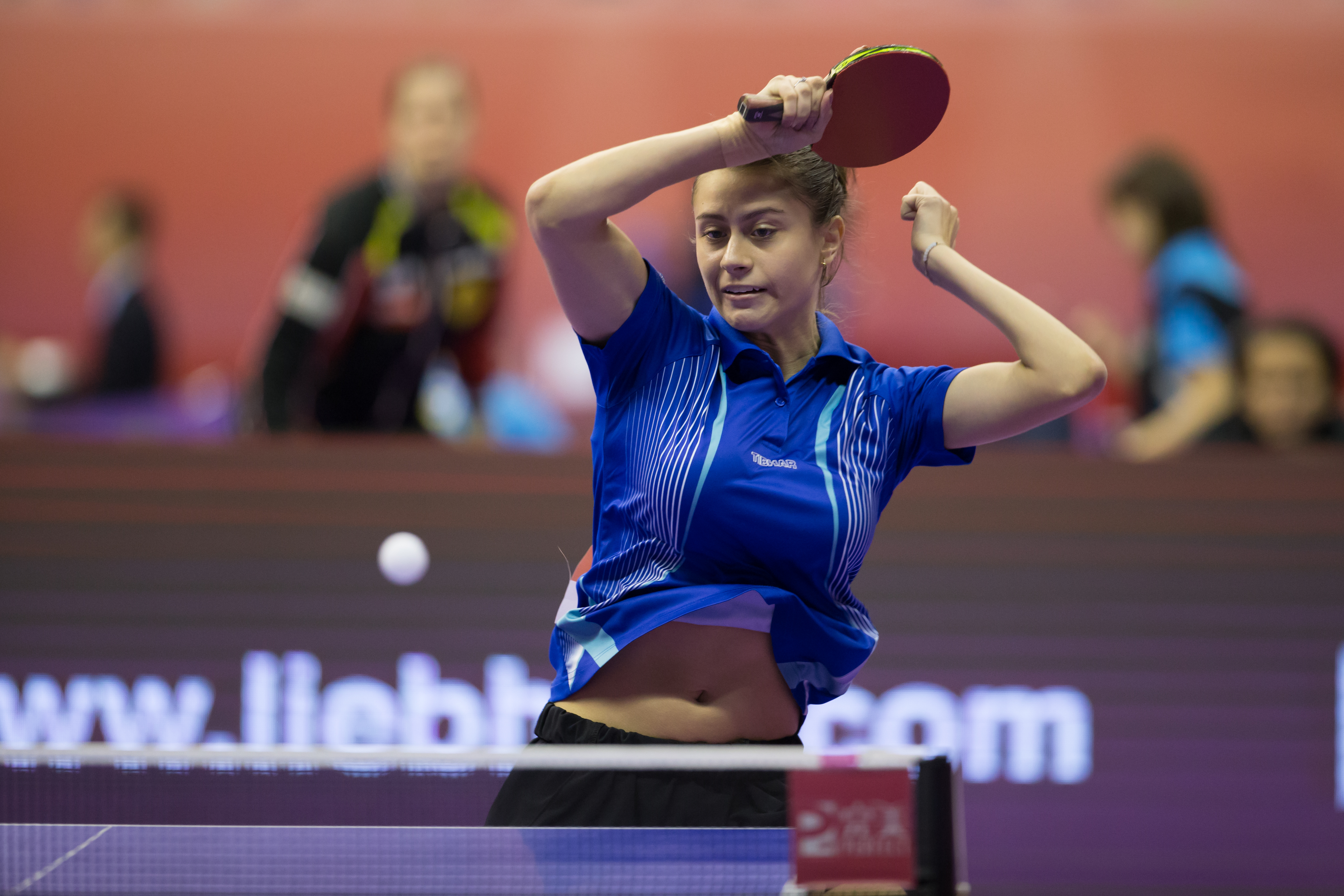
- Takahashi in 2016

Personal information
- Born: 19 July 2000 (age 26) São Bernardo do Campo, São Paulo, Brazil
- Height: 1.70 m (5 ft 7 in)
- Weight: 54 kg (119 lb)

Sport
- Sport: Table tennis
- Club: TTC 1946 Weinheim
- Highest ranking: 16 (22 April 2025)
- Current ranking: 27 (28 September 2026)
Medal record
Women's table tennis
Representing Brazil
Pan American Games
Silver medal – second place	2019 Lima	Mixed doubles
Silver medal – second place	2019 Lima	Team
Silver medal – second place	2023 Santiago	Singles
Silver medal – second place	2023 Santiago	Doubles
Silver medal – second place	2023 Santiago	Mixed doubles
Bronze medal – third place	2019 Lima	Singles
Bronze medal – third place	2019 Lima	Doubles
Bronze medal – third place	2023 Santiago	Team
Pan American Championships
Gold medal – first place	2017 Cartagena de Indias	Mixed doubles
Gold medal – first place	2017 Cartagena de Indias	Team
Gold medal – first place	2018 Santiago	Team
Gold medal – first place	2021 Lima	Mixed doubles
Gold medal – first place	2021 Lima	Team
Gold medal – first place	2022 Santiago	Mixed doubles
Gold medal – first place	2022 Santiago	Team
Gold medal – first place	2025 Rock Hill	Mixed doubles
Silver medal – second place	2019 Asunción	Singles
Silver medal – second place	2019 Asunción	Team
Silver medal – second place	2021 Lima	Singles
Silver medal – second place	2023 Havana	Singles
Silver medal – second place	2023 Havana	Mixed doubles
Silver medal – second place	2024 San Salvador	Singles
Silver medal – second place	2024 San Salvador	Mixed doubles
Silver medal – second place	2025 Rock Hill	Singles
Bronze medal – third place	2017 Cartagena de Indias	Singles
Bronze medal – third place	2017 Cartagena de Indias	Doubles
Bronze medal – third place	2018 Santiago	Singles
Bronze medal – third place	2023 Havana	Doubles
Bronze medal – third place	2025 Rock Hill	Team
Pan American Cup
Gold medal – first place	2024 Corpus Christi	Singles
Gold medal – first place	2025 San Francisco	Singles
Bronze medal – third place	2018 Asunción	Singles
Latin American Championships
Gold medal – first place	2016 San Juan	Team
Gold medal – first place	2018 Havana	Singles
Gold medal – first place	2018 Havana	Team
Bronze medal – third place	2016 San Juan	Singles
Bronze medal – third place	2018 Havana	Doubles
Bronze medal – third place	2018 Havana	Mixed doubles

Bruna Yumi Takahashi (born 19 July 2000) is a Brazilian professional table tennis player. In April 2025, she reached world No. 16 in singles by ITTF, the all-time best ranking from a Brazilian on women's side. Among her greatest achievements in singles are reaching the quarter-finals of the 2025 Table Tennis World Cup, the round of 16 of the 2025 World Table Tennis Championships, being the best female player in the world from outside Asia in October 2025, and beating players from the world's top 10. She is currently the fourth best-ranked non-Asian in the ITTF/WTT singles ranking, and the second from the Americas, after Puerto Rico's Adriana Díaz.

Takahashi represented Brazil at the Summer Olympics three times since 2016. She has a sister, Giulia, who also plays table tennis at professional level.

== Career ==
=== 2013–2016 ===
In October 2013, Takahashi won the U13 Latin American Championship title in singles.

On November 1, 2015, she became a cadet World Champion, when she won the World Challenge title in the cadet category, in Sharm El-Shwikh, Egypt.

Takahashi won bronze in singles and gold in team at the 2016 Latin American Table Tennis Championships.

=== 2016: Summer Olympics first apparition ===
At 15 years old, Takahashi was the youngest athlete on Team Brazil at the 2016 Summer Olympics. As part of the Brazilian team, her only match was with the then current Olympic champion, Chinese Li Xiaoxia.

=== 2017–2020 ===
Takahashi participated in the adult World Championships for the first time in 2017, in singles and doubles.

At the 2017 Pan American Table Tennis Championships, she obtained four medals: bronze in singles and doubles, and gold in mixed doubles and team.

In March 2018 she won her biggest individual title when she became champion of the Latin American Table Tennis Championships.

At the 2018 Youth Olympic Games, in Buenos Aires, she reached the quarterfinals of the individual tournament, losing only to China's Sun Yingsha, who finished with the gold medal. Thus, Takahashi finished in the top 8.

At the end of 2018, she reached the semifinals of the 2018 Pan American Table Tennis Championships, where she was eliminated by Adriana Diaz, obtaining bronze in singles.She also won gold in the team event.

At the 2019 Pan American Games in Lima, Takahashi was seeded N° 5 in women's singles. She won four medals at the 2019 Pan American Games: bronze in singles and doubles, and silver in mixed doubles and for the Team.

=== 2020: Second Olympics ===
Takahashi participated at the 2020 Summer Olympics, both in the individual and team events.

=== 2021–present ===
In May 2022, Takahashi entered the top 20 of the ITTF world rankings in women's singles, making her the first Brazilian to achieve this feat.

In July 2022, she reached the quarter-finals of the WTT Star Contender in Budapest, being the only non-Asian to reach the quarter-finals of the tournament.

Bruna Takahashi was twice runner-up at the Pan American Table Tennis Championships in singles, in 2021 and 2023.

She won the bronze medal three times at the WTT Contender in Lima 2022, Tunis 2023 and Rio de Janeiro 2023, reaching the semi-finals of the tournaments. In Tunisia, she was the only non-Asian to reach the semi-final.

At the 2023 Pan American Games, Takahashi reached the final, and against her biggest rival in the Americas, Puerto Rican Adriana Diaz, she opened 3 sets to 2, but ended up taking silver with a score of 3 to 4. She also obtained the silver in doubles, mixed doubles and a bronze in Team.

She reached the round of 16 of the WTT Champions of Xinxiang 2023 and Incheon 2024.

In January 2024, Takahashi obtained one of her greatest individual titles when she won the Pan American Table Tennis Cup. With this, she also guaranteed a place in the Table Tennis World Cup, held in Macau, China, in April.

At the 2024 World Team Table Tennis Championships, the Brazilian team reached the round of 16 of the tournament for the first time. Although Brazil was eliminated by South Korea in the round of 16, in this match Takahashi defeated Shin Yu-bin, the world number 8, by 3 sets to 2, obtaining one of the biggest victories of her career.

At the 2024 Table Tennis World Cup, held in Macau, China, Takahashi was drawn to play against Joo Cheonhui (world no. 17) and Sarah Hanffou (world no. 86) in group 15. Takahashi beat Sarah Hanffou by 3 sets to 1 and competed to qualify for the round of 16 with Joo Cheonhui, where she needed to win to advance to the stage. The Korean managed to impose her game and came out ahead by 2 sets to 0, qualifying for the round of 16. Takahashi still tied the game at 2-2, however, being eliminated in the group stage, in her first participation in the World Cup.

At the 2024 WTT Contender in Rio de Janeiro, she managed to repeat her 2023 result, reaching the semifinals of a tournament of this size for the 4th time. She also reached the doubles semifinals, with her sister Giulia Takahashi.

=== 2024 Summer Olympics ===
At the 2024 Summer Olympics, she and Vitor Ishiy were eliminated in the mixed doubles debut by 4 sets to 2. In the singles draw, she won her first match at the Olympics, but was eliminated in the second round by Lily Zhang by 4 sets to 2.

=== 2024–2028 ===
At the 2024 China Grand Smash in Beijing, Takahashi became the first Brazilian to reach the round of 16 of this type of tournament.

At the 2024 Pan American Table Tennis Championships, she was runner-up in singles and mixed doubles.

At the 2025 Table Tennis World Cup, held in Macau, China, she won 2 matches in the group stage, reaching the round of 16 of this tournament for the first time in her career, where she played against world number 14, Bernadette Szőcs, from Romania. Takahashi won the match 4 sets to 0, becoming the first Brazilian woman to reach the quarter-finals of the World Cup, where she faced world number 4 Chen Xingtong of China, losing 4 sets to 1, in a disputed match (8-11, 11-6, 11-13, 7-11, 7-11). Takahashi was the only non-Asian to reach the quarter-finals of this tournament.

Shortly after the World Cup, Takahashi reached the world number 16, the best ranking of her career, also becoming the best table tennis player in the Americas at that time.

At the 2025 World Table Tennis Championships, in the singles bracket, she won 3 matches and became the first Brazilian woman in history to reach the round of 16 of the World Championship, where she faced Chen Xingtong, repeating the confrontation that occurred the previous month at the World Cup. Takahashi won the first set, and, as in the previous match against the Chinese, she offered great resistance, but was eliminated again by 4 to 1, now with partial scores of 12-10, 7-11, 8-11, 7-11, 8-11. She and Calderano also participated in the mixed doubles, where they were eliminated in the 2nd round by the world's No. 1 pair.

At the WTT Star Contender Ljubljana, playing in mixed doubles alongside Calderano, they defeated the world's No. 3 duo, Chun Ting Wong and Hoi Kem Doo, from Hong Kong, and later the German duo Verdonschot/Schreiner and the Hong Kong duo Ng/Yiu to reach the final of the tournament, where they faced the South Korean duo No. 5 in the world and No. 1 seed of the tournament, composed of Lim Jonghoon and Shin Yubin. The Brazilian duo was defeated by 3 sets to 0, thus finishing in 2nd place, with the silver medal. In singles, she was eliminated in the round of 16 by former world No. 1 Zhu Yuling by a score of 3 sets to 1, after having beaten Chinese Fan Shuhan in the second round by 3 sets to 0.

At the WTT Contender in Buenos Aires, she didn't do well in singles, losing 3-2 in her debut. However, in mixed doubles, she reached the final of a WTT Contender for the first time in her career, and won her first title alongside Hugo Calderano.

Takahashi participated in the European Grand Smash, one of the 4 tournaments equivalent to a tennis Grand Slam on the table tennis circuit, held in Sweden in August, ranked number 19 in the world and 2nd best non-Asian in the world, behind only the Romanian Bernadette Szőcs. In this tournament, she obtained her best results in Grand Smash both in singles and mixed doubles: in singles, she obtained the biggest victory of her career defeating the Japanese world number 6 Miwa Harimoto in the 2nd round and going to the round of 16 to face the Chinese Chen Yi, 10th best in the world, where she played another great game, taking it to the last set but being eliminated by 3 sets to 2. In mixed doubles, together with Calderano, they reached the quarterfinals of a Smash for the first time, and, when facing the Japanese duo seeded No. 4 in the tournament, Sora Matsushima and Satsuki Odo, they started winning 2 sets to 0, but ended up being eliminated 3 to 2, being one set away from reaching the semifinals and subsequently a medal.

At the WTT Champions Macau, a tournament equivalent to a WTA 1000 in the table tennis circuit, She debuted with a win, and in the 2nd round She faced former world number 1 Zhu Yuling, a home athlete, current world number 7, losing 3-0.

At the China Grand Smash, she reached the second round and, having to face Zhu Yuling for the third time this year, did two even sets but was ultimately eliminated. In the mixed doubles, she and Calderano achieved a historic result by defeating the world No. 5 Spanish duo Robles and Xiao and reaching the semifinals, securing a medal, the best result in Brazil's history in mixed doubles. They were the only non-Chinese duo to reach the semifinals of this tournament.

In October 2025, she became fourth-time Pan American Table Tennis Championships champion in mixed doubles, and for the fifth time she was runner-up in singles. After these results, she became the 6th best in the world in mixed doubles, and also became the best singles player in the world outside of Asia.

At the WTT Champions in Montpellier, she won in the first round, and in the round of 16, facing the world number 5, China's Wang Yidi, she came very close to achieving the biggest victory of her career: she opened up a 2-1 set lead, and in the final set, she was winning 8-5, but ended up being eliminated by a narrow margin, 3 sets to 2. Wang Yidi ended up being the champion of the tournament.

At the WTT Champions in Frankfurt, she had a difficult debut against Yang Xiaoxin, a former top 10 player, winning 3-2, and in the second round she faces the best player in Africa, the Egyptian Hana Goda, world number 26, being eliminated by 3 sets to 2.

In February 2026, the mixed doubles pair of Takahashi and Calderano became the 5th best in the world ranking, behind only Asian pairs.

At the 2026 Singapore Grand Smash, she and Calderano reached the mixed doubles final at a Smash for the first time, defeating the Hong Kong No. 3 ranked pair Wong/Doo. Takahashi and Calderano became the first non-Asian pair to reach a Smash final. The Brazilian pair faced the world No. 1 ranked pair, South Korea's Lim Jonghoon and Shin Yubin, where, in a high-level match, they defeated the Olympic medalists 3-0, becoming the first non-Chinese pair to win a WTT Grand Smash. With this result, they rose to the No. 4 ranked pair in the world. At singles, she was unlucky in the draw and had to face world number 10 Hina Hayata in the first round. She started the match leading 2 sets to 1 against the Japanese player, but ended up being eliminated 3 sets to 2.

After reaching the semifinals of the US Grand Smash, she and Calderano became the world's number 2 mixed doubles pair.

== Best results by type of tournament ==
=== Singles ===
Her best ranking in singles was No. 16 in the world, obtained on 22 April 2025.

- Latin American Table Tennis Championships: Champion (2018)
- Pan American Table Tennis Championships: Runner-up (2019, 2021, 2023, 2024, 2025)
- Pan American Games: Runner-up (2023)
- WTT Contender: Bronze medal (Lima 2022, Tunis 2023, Rio 2023, Rio 2024)
- WTT Star Contender: Quarterfinals (Budapest 2022)
- WTT Champions: Round of 16 (Xinxiang 2023, Incheon 2024, Macau 2025, Montpellier 2025, Chongqing 2025, Frankfurt 2025, Chongqing 2026, Frankfurt 2026)
- Grand Smash: Round of 16 (Beijing 2024, Malmö 2025)
- Table Tennis World Cup: Quarterfinals (Macau 2025)
- World Table Tennis Championships: Round of 16 (Doha 2025)
- Olympic Games: Second round (Paris 2024)

=== Doubles ===
- Pan American Table Tennis Championships: Bronze medal (2017, 2023)
- Pan American Games: Runner-up (2023)
- WTT Contender: Bronze medal (Rio 2024)
- World Table Tennis Championships: Second round (Budapest 2019, Durban 2023)

=== Mixed doubles ===
In July 2026, the Takahashi/Calderano duo was ranked 2nd in the world, this being the best ranking obtained by Takahashi in this modality, despite having already made partnerships with other players.

Takahashi's best individual results in this modality:

- Pan American Table Tennis Championships: Champion (2017, 2021, 2022, 2025)
- Pan American Games: Runner-up (2019, 2023)
- WTT Contender: Champion (Buenos Aires 2025)
- WTT Star Contender: Runner-up (Ljubljana 2025, São José dos Campos 2026)
- Grand Smash: Champion (Singapore 2026)
- WTT Finals: Group stage (Hong Kong 2025)
- World Table Tennis Championships: Second round (Durban 2023, Doha 2025)
- Olympic Games: Round of 16 (Paris 2024)

=== Team ===
The Brazilian team was the 10th best in the world in March 2024, when it entered the top 10 of the world rankings for the first time.

- Pan American Table Tennis Championships: Champion (2017, 2018, 2021, 2022)
- Pan American Games: Runner-up (2019)
- World Table Tennis Championships: Round of 16 (Busan 2024)
- Olympic Games: Round of 16 (Rio 2016, Tokyo 2020)

== Victories over Top 10 Players ==
- 3 sets to 2 against Shin Yu-bin (world No. 8) at the 2024 World Team Table Tennis Championships
- 3 sets to 2 against Miwa Harimoto (world No. 6) at the 2025 European Grand Smash

== See also ==
- Takahashi - Calderano doubles team
