= Wu Yue (table tennis) =

Chinese American table tennis player

Yue "Jennifer" Wu
Personal information
- Full name: Yue Wu
- Nationality: United States
- Born: January 4, 1990 (age 36) Beijing, China

Sport
- Sport: Table tennis
- Club: New York Indoor Sports Club
- Playing style: offensive
Medal record
Women's table tennis
Representing United States
Pan American Games
Gold medal – first place	2015 Toronto	Team
Gold medal – first place	2015 Toronto	Singles
Silver medal – second place	2019 Lima	Singles
Silver medal – second place	2019 Lima	Doubles
Bronze medal – third place	2019 Lima	Team
Bronze medal – third place	2019 Lima	Mixed doubles

Yue "Jennifer" Wu (born January 4, 1990) is a Chinese American table tennis player originally from China who has been named to the U.S. team at the 2016 Summer Olympics. She was a gold medalist in women's team and women's singles at the 2015 Pan American Games, which qualified her for the 2016 Olympic Games.

== Personal life ==
Wu grew up in Beijing, China and began playing table tennis at age 8. She moved to the United States in 2008. She was given the American name Jennifer, but says she identifies more with her given name Yue.

Wu has been a resident of Fort Lee, New Jersey.
