= Adriana Díaz (table tennis) =

Puerto Rican table tennis player

Personal information
- Full name: Adriana Yamila Díaz González
- Nationality: Puerto Rico
- Born: October 31, 2000 (age 25) Arecibo, Puerto Rico
- Height: 5 ft 4 in (163 cm)
- Weight: 141 lb (64 kg)

Sport
- Sport: Table tennis
- Playing style: Topspin and counter attacker
- Equipment: Viscaria Super ALC; Tenergy 64; Tenergy 05
- Highest ranking: Senior: 9 (March 2022); U21: 2 (August 2019); U18: 4 (December 2018); U15: 4 (December 2015)
- Current ranking: 20 (28 September 2026)
Medal record
Women's table tennis
Representing Puerto Rico
Pan American Games
Gold medal – first place	2019 Lima	Singles
Gold medal – first place	2019 Lima	Doubles
Gold medal – first place	2019 Lima	Team
Gold medal – first place	2023 Santiago	Singles
Bronze medal – third place	2015 Toronto	Team
Bronze medal – third place	2019 Lima	Mixed doubles
Bronze medal – third place	2023 Santiago	Doubles
Pan American Championship
Gold medal – first place	2017 Cartagena de Indias	Singles
Gold medal – first place	2018 Santiago	Singles
Gold medal – first place	2018 Santiago	Mixed doubles
Gold medal – first place	2019 Asunción	Singles
Gold medal – first place	2019 Asunción	Doubles
Gold medal – first place	2021 Lima	Singles
Gold medal – first place	2021 Lima	Doubles
Gold medal – first place	2022 Santiago	Singles
Gold medal – first place	2024 San Salvador	Singles
Gold medal – first place	2025 Rock Hill	Singles
Gold medal – first place	2025 Rock Hill	Team
Bronze medal – third place	2017 Cartagena de Indias	Doubles
Bronze medal – third place	2022 Santiago	Doubles
Bronze medal – third place	2022 Santiago	Team
Bronze medal – third place	2025 Rock Hill	Doubles
Pan American Cup
Gold medal – first place	2020 Guaynabo	Singles
Gold medal – first place	2019 Guaynabo	Singles
Central American and Caribbean Games
Gold medal – first place	2014 Veracruz	Team
Gold medal – first place	2014 Veracruz	Mixed doubles
Gold medal – first place	2018 Barranquilla	Singles
Gold medal – first place	2018 Barranquilla	Doubles
Gold medal – first place	2018 Barranquilla	Mixed doubles
Gold medal – first place	2018 Barranquilla	Team
Gold medal – first place	2023 San Salvador	Singles
Silver medal – second place	2014 Veracruz	Doubles
Bronze medal – third place	2014 Veracruz	Singles
Bronze medal – third place	2023 San Salvador	Doubles
Silver medal – second place	2023 San Salvador	Team
Bronze medal – third place	2023 San Salvador	Mixed doubles
Gold medal – first place	2026 Santo Doingo	Singles
Gold medal – first place	2026 Santo Doingo	Doubles
Gold medal – first place	2026 Santo Doingo	Team
Silver medal – second place	2026 Santo Doingo	Mixed doubles
Latin American Championship
Silver medal – second place	2016 San Juan	Team
Bronze medal – third place	2016 San Juan	Mixed doubles

Adriana Yamila Díaz González (born October 31, 2000) is a Puerto Rican professional table tennis player. In March 2022, she reached a career-high singles ranking of world No. 9 by ITTF/WTT and became the all-time best ranked player from Latin America on women's side. Currently ranked No. 19, she is the third non-Asian player in the singles world ranking, and the first from the Americas.

Díaz has a sister, Melanie and a cousin, Brian, who also play table tennis at professional level.

== International competition ==
On April 1, 2016, Díaz made history becoming the first Puerto Rican female table tennis player to qualify for the Olympics. She competed at the 2016 Summer Olympics where she defeated Olufunke Oshonaike 4–2 in the preliminary round before losing to Li Xue 0–4 in the second round.

== Professional career ==
Díaz made her professional debut for Dabang Smashers of the Ultimate Table Tennis league on June 16, 2018, with a 3–0 victory over Pooja Sahasrabudhe. On her second outing, she defeated the winner of the 2018 ITTF Europe Top 16 Cup, Bernadette Szocs (2–1).

On January 30, 2022, Díaz, along with her sister Melanie, ranked #5 in Women's Doubles Pairs by the International Table Tennis Federation.

== Clubs ==
- (Puerto Rico) Águilas de la Montaña
- (China) Zhengding Table Tennis (2017–2018)
- (India) Dabang Smashers T.T.C. (2018)

== Best results by type of tournament ==
=== Singles ===
Her best ranking in singles was No. 9 in the world, obtained in March 2022.

- Pan American Table Tennis Championships: Champion (2017, 2018, 2021, 2022, 2024, 2025)
- Pan American Games: Champion (2019, 2023)
- WTT Contender: Silver medal (Muscat 2023)
- WTT Star Contender: Bronze medal (Bangkok 2023)
- WTT Champions: Quarterfinals (Macau 2025)
- Grand Smash: Round of 16 (Singapore 2025)
- WTT Cup Finals: Quarterfinals (Xinxiang 2022)
- Table Tennis World Cup: Quarterfinals (Macau 2024)
- World Table Tennis Championships: Round of 16 (Houston 2021, Durban 2023)
- Olympic Games: Round of 16 (Paris 2024)

== Achievements ==
- 2020 Pan America Cup - Gold Medal
- 2019 Pan American Games - Gold Medal
- 2016 US Open - Gold Medal
- 2015 Pan American Games - Bronze Medal
- 2014 Central American and Caribbean Games - Gold Medal
- 2014 Pan American Sport Festival – Women's Singles Champion
- 2014 Latin American Youth Championships – Cadet Girls Singles Champion, Cadet Girls Doubles Champion, Cadet Mixed Doubles Champion
- 2013 Peru Junior & Cadet Open – Cadet Girls Singles Champion

== Sponsorships and endorsements ==
Díaz is sponsored by Butterfly and Adidas.

== Awards ==
Year	Award	Category	Result	Ref.
2016	Premios Juventud	La Nueva Promesa	Won	

Olympic Games
Preceded by Charles Flaherty	Flagbearer for Puerto Rico with Brian Afanador; Tokyo 2020	Succeeded by William Flaherty
